= Annie Award for Best Animated Special Production =

Annual US film award

- Awarded for: Excellence in animation
- Country: United States
- Presented by: ASIFA-Hollywood
- First award: 2011
- Currently held by: Snoopy Presents: A Summer Musical (2025)
- Website: annieawards.org

The Annie Award for Best Animated Special Production is an Annie Award, given annually to a non-theatrical animated production since 2011.

== Winners ==
=== 2010s ===
Year	Film	Studios
2011 (39th)
2011 (39th)	Kung Fu Panda: Secrets of the Masters	DreamWorks Animation
2011 (39th)	Thank You	Cartoon Network Studios
2011 (39th)	Batman: Year One	Warner Bros. Animation
2011 (39th)	Ice Age: A Mammoth Christmas	Blue Sky Studios
2011 (39th)	Prey 2	Blur Studio
2011 (39th)	Star Tours	Industrial Light & Magic
2012 (40th)
2012 (40th)	Despicable Me Minion Mayhem	Illumination Entertainment
2012 (40th)	Batman: The Dark Knight Returns - Part 1	Warner Bros. Animation
2012 (40th)	Beforal Orel	Starburns Industries, Inc.
2012 (40th)	Tron: Uprising - Beck's Beginning	Disney Television Animation
2012 (40th)	Dragons: Gift of the Night Fury	DreamWorks Animation
2012 (40th)	Justice League: Doom	Warner Bros. Animation
2013 (41st)
2013 (41st)	Chipotle Scarecrow	Chipotle/Moonbot Studios
2013 (41st)	Listening Is An Act Of Love	StoryCorps/Rauch Bros. Animation
2013 (41st)	Room on the Broom	Magic Light Pictures
2013 (41st)	Toy Story of Terror!	Pixar Animation
2014 (42nd)
2014 (42nd)	A Spacetime Odyssey	Voyager Pictures LLC
2014 (42nd)	Dawn of the Dragon Racers	DreamWorks Animation
2014 (42nd)	How Murray Saved Christmas	Universal Television
2014 (42nd)	Polariffic	Bent Image Lab/Pershing Road Productions
2014 (42nd)	Toy Story That Time Forgot	Pixar Animation
2015 (43rd)
2015 (43rd)	He Named Me Malala	Parkes-MacDonald/Little Door
2015 (43rd)	Elf: Buddy's Musical Christmas	Warner Bros. Animation
2015 (43rd)	I Am A Witness	Moonbot Studios
2015 (43rd)	Kite	Epic Games
2015 (43rd)	Kurt Cobain: Montage of Heck	End of Movie, LLC
2015 (43rd)	Niko and the Sword of Light	Titmouse, Inc./Amazon Studios
2016 (44th)
2016 (44th)	Pear Cider and Cigarettes	Massive Swerve Studios/Passion Pictures
2016 (44th)	Audrie & Daisy	Afterimage Public Media
2016 (44th)	Kung Fu Panda: Secrets of the Scroll	DreamWorks Animation
2016 (44th)	Little Big Awesome	Titmouse, Inc./Amazon Studios
2016 (44th)	Middle School: The Worst Years of My Life	CBS Films/J.P. Entertainment
2017 (45th)
2017 (45th)	Revolting Rhymes	Magic Light Pictures
2017 (45th)	Imaginary Friend Society "Feeling Sad"	Hornet
2017 (45th)	Olaf's Frozen Adventure	Walt Disney Animation Studios
2017 (45th)	Pig: The Dam Keeper Poems	Tonko House
2017 (45th)	Tangled: Before Ever After	Walt Disney Television Animation
2018 (46th)
2018 (46th)	Mary Poppins Returns	Walt Disney Pictures
2018 (46th)	Back to the Moon	Google Spotlight Stories, Google Doodles, Nexus Studios
2018 (46th)	The Emperor's Newest Clothes	HBO / Starburns Industries
2018 (46th)	The Highway Rat	Magic Light Pictures
2019 (47th)
2019 (47th)	How to Train Your Dragon Homecoming	DreamWorks Animation
2019 (47th)	Guava Island Titles and Prologue	Six Point Harness / Amazon
2019 (47th)	Infinity Train The Perennial Child	Cartoon Network Studios
2019 (47th)	SpongeBob SquarePants SpongeBob's Big Birthday Blowout	Nickelodeon and Jonas & Co
2019 (47th)	Zog	Magic Light Pictures

=== 2020s ===
Year	Film	Studios
2020 (48th)
2020 (48th)	The Snail and the Whale	Magic Light Pictures
2020 (48th)	Libresse / Bodyform - #WombStories	Chelsea Pictures
2020 (48th)	Nixie & Nimbo	Hornet
2020 (48th)	Shooom's Odyssey	Picolo Pictures
2020 (48th)	Baba Yaga	Baobab Studios
2021 (49th)
2021 (49th)	Namoo	Baobab Studios
2021 (49th)	Snoopy Presents: For Auld Lang Syne	WildBrain Studios, Apple
2021 (49th)	La Vie de Château	Films Grand Huit, Miyu Productions
2021 (49th)	Mum is Pouring Rain	Laïdak Films and Dandelooo
2021 (49th)	The Witcher: Nightmare of the Wolf	Studio Mir, Netflix
2022 (50th)
2022 (50th)	The Boy, the Mole, the Fox and the Horse	NoneMore Productions, Bad Robot Productions
2022 (50th)	Prehistoric Planet	BBC Studios, Apple
2022 (50th)	Superworm	Magic Light Pictures
2022 (50th)	The House	Nexus Studios, Netflix
2022 (50th)	The Sandman	Netflix, Warner Bros. Television
2023 (51st)
2023 (51st)	Snoopy Presents: One-of-a-Kind Marcie	WildBrain Studios, Apple Studios
2023 (51st)	Invincible: Atom Eve	Amazon MGM Studios, Skybound Entertainment
2023 (51st)	Shape Island: The Winter Blues	Bix Pix Entertainment, Apple Studios
2023 (51st)	The Smeds and The Smoos	Magic Light Pictures
2023 (51st)	The Velveteen Rabbit	Magic Light Pictures, Apple Studios
2024 (52nd)
2024 (52nd)	Orion and the Dark	DreamWorks Animation
2024 (52nd)	A Bear Named Wojtek	The Illuminated Film Company, Filmograf
2024 (52nd)	Mog's Christmas	Lupus Films
2024 (52nd)	Tabby McTat	Magic Light Pictures
2024 (52nd)	Yuck!	Ikki Films, Iliade et Films
2025 (53rd)
2025 (53rd)	Snoopy Presents: A Summer Musical	WildBrain Studios, Apple Studios
2025 (53rd)	A Loud House Christmas Movie: Naughty or Nice	Nickelodeon Animation Studio, Jam Filled Entertainment
2025 (53rd)	Adult Swim's The Elephant	Titmouse, Inc., Williams Street
2025 (53rd)	Not Just a Goof	Venturia Animation Studios, CNEK Films LLC
2025 (53rd)	The Night Before Christmas in Wonderland	Lupus Films, Universal Pictures Content Group

== Multiple wins and nominations ==
=== Wins ===
- DreamWorks Animation-3
- WildBrain Studios-2

=== Nominations (3 or more) ===
- DreamWorks Animation-6 (3 wins)
- Warner Bros. Animation-4 (no wins)
- WildBrain Studios-3 (2 wins)
- Titmouse, Inc.-3 (no wins)

== See also ==
- Primetime Emmy Award for Outstanding Animated Program
