= 51st Annie Awards =

2024 US media awards ceremony

- Date: February 17, 2024
- Site: Royce Hall; Los Angeles, California, U.S.
- Organized by: ASIFA-Hollywood

Highlights
- Best Animated Feature: Spider-Man: Across the Spider-Verse
- Best Direction: Joaquim Dos Santos, Kemp Powers, and Justin K. Thompson; Spider-Man: Across the Spider-Verse
- Most awards: Spider-Man: Across the Spider-Verse (7)
- Most nominations: Film; Nimona (9); Television/Broadcast; Blue Eye Samurai (7)

The 51st Annual Annie Awards honoring excellence in the field of animation of 2023 was held on February 17, 2024, at the University of California, Los Angeles's Royce Hall in Los Angeles, California, in 37 categories.

The nominees were announced on January 11, 2024, Nimona led the nominations for film category with nine, followed by Spider-Man: Across the Spider-Verse, The Boy and The Heron and Suzume with seven. In television/broadcast category Blue Eye Samurai led the category with seven, followed by Star Wars: Visions with six. For the first time in 32 years, Disney and Pixar films were completely shut out of the Best Animated Feature category. Both The Boy and The Heron and Suzume tie the record with the most nominations for an anime production.

== Winners and nominees ==
=== Productions categories ===
Best Animated Feature	Best Animated Feature — Independent
Spider-Man: Across the Spider-Verse – Sony Pictures Animation; The Boy and the Heron – Studio Ghibli / Distributed by GKIDS; Nimona – Annapurna Animation for Netflix; Suzume – CoMix Wave Films Inc. and STORY inc. / Distributed by Crunchyroll, Sony Pictures, and TOHO; Teenage Mutant Ninja Turtles: Mutant Mayhem – Paramount Pictures and Nickelodeon Movies	Robot Dreams – Arcadia Motion Pictures; Ernest & Celestine: A Trip to Gibberitia – Folivari, Mélusine Productions, Studio Canal / Distributed by GKIDS; Four Souls of Coyote – Cinemon Entertainment; The Inventor – Curiosity Studios; White Plastic Sky – SALTO Films & Artichoke
Best Animated Special Production	Best Animated Short Subject
Snoopy Presents: One-of-a-Kind Marcie – WildBrain Studios in association with Apple; Invincible: Atom Eve – Amazon MGM Studios and Skybound Entertainment; Shape Island: The Winter Blues – Bix Pix Entertainment in association with Apple; The Smeds and The Smoos – Magic Light Pictures; The Velveteen Rabbit – Magic Light Pictures in association with Apple	WAR IS OVER! Inspired by the Music of John & Yoko – ElectroLeague; Carne de Dios – Ojo Raro and Fedora Productions; Daffy in Wackyland – Warner Bros. Animation; HUMO – Outik Animation, 3rd Street Video, Mindsoup Entertainment, and IMCINE; PINA – PUNCHLINE CINEMA / NEXT DAYS FILMS
Best Sponsored Production	Best Animated Television/Broadcast Production for Preschool Children
"Video Games" by Tenacious D – Pinreel Inc.; Alzheimer's Research UK 'Change The Ending' – Passion Pictures; "Laugh Track" by The National (featuring Phoebe Bridgers) – Bernard Derriman; Up in smoke – NOMINT	Ghee Happy: "Navagraha" – Ghee Happy Studio; Batwheels: "To the Batmobile!" – Warner Bros. Animation; The Creature Cases: "The Forest Food Bandit" – Silvergate Media/Team TO/Choice/Provisions/Netflix; Playdate with Winnie the Pooh: "Piglet, Tigger and the Cardboard Box" – Oddbot Inc.; StoryBots: Answer Time: "Fractions" – JibJab Bros. Studios for Netflix
Best Animated Television/Broadcast Production for Children	Best Mature Audience Animated Television/Broadcast Production
Hilda: "Chapter 8: The Fairy Isle" – Hilda Productions Limited, a Silvergate Media Company, Netflix Inc., and Mercury Filmworks; Curses!: "The Baboon Temple" – DreamWorks Animation; Marvel's Moon Girl and Devil Dinosaur: "The Beyonder" – Flying Bark Productions / Disney Television Animation; My Dad the Bounty Hunter: "Bizarre Ride" – A Netflix Series; Shape Island: "Square's Special Place" – Bix Pix Entertainment in association with Apple	Blue Eye Samurai: "Pilot: Hammerscale" – A Netflix Series / 3 Arts Entertainment and Blue Spirit Productions; Big Mouth: "The International Show" – Netflix; Bob's Burgers: "Amelia" – 20th Television Animation; Scavengers Reign: "The Signal" – Max in association with Titmouse Animation and Green Street; Tomato Kitchen – Bilibili / Studio Reflection
Best Animated Limited Series	Best Student Film
Kizazi Moto: Generation Fire: "Enkai" – Triggerfish Animation Studio and Blinkink; Only You: An Animated Shorts Collection: "Yellowbird" – Afterman production in association with Max/Warner Bros. Discovery; Pokémon: Path to the Peak: "Episode 1" – The Pokémon Company International	The Little Poet – Justine King, director and producer (California Institute of the Arts); From the Top – Rich Farris, director; Martina Buendia Silva, producer (National Film and Television School); Kolaj – Besen Dilek, director and producer (Filamakademie Baden-Württemberg GmbH); La quête de l'humain – Mélina Lenco, Lucie Juric, Caroline Leibel, Faustine Merle, and Claire Pellet, student team (Gobelins, l'école de l'image); Quem Salva – Laure Devin, Maxime Bourstin, Nathan Medam, Charles Hechinger, and Titouan Jaouen, student team (Supinfocom Rubika)

=== Individual achievement categories ===
Outstanding Achievement for Animated Effects in an Animated Television/Broadcast Production	Outstanding Achievement for Animated Effects in an Animated Production
Blue Eye Samurai: "All Evil Dreams and Angry Words" – Thomas Decaens, Karl Burtin, and Laurent Bretonniere; The Bad Guys: A Very Bad Holiday – Sateesh Malla, Russell Richardson Jr., Akash Gopal, Basavaraj P, and Kevin Rumold; Kizazi Moto: Generation Fire: "Moremi" – Matthew Dunwoody, Dmitry Sarkisov, Podchasha Yuri Anatolyevich, Richard Bothma, and Emile Van Straaten; Star Wars: Visions: "Sith" – Jonatan Catalán, Alberto Sánchez, Phoebe Arjona, Virginia Cantaro, and Rubén Hinarejos; What If...?: "What If... Kahhori Reshaped the World?" – Ryan Barringer, Rajkumar Gurudu, Bipin Kumar Patra, and Pranil Ravindra Mahajan	Spider-Man: Across the Spider-Verse – Pav Grochola, Filippo Maccari, Naoki Kato, Nicola Finizio, and Edmond Boulet-Gilly; Chicken Run: Dawn of the Nugget – Charles Copping, Jon Biggins, Jim Lewis, Rich Spence, and Martin Lipmann; Elemental – Chris Chapman, Tim Speltz, Krzysztof Rost, Amit Baadkar, Ravindra Dwivedi; The Peasants – Lukasz Mackiewicz and Kamil Polak; Suzume – Yoshitaka Takeuchi and Hiroyuki Seshita
Outstanding Achievement for Character Animation in an Animated Television / Broadcast Production	Outstanding Achievement for Character Animation in an Animated Feature Production
Blue Eye Samurai: "Episodes 101, 104 and 106" – Alex Bard; Adventure Time: Fionna and Cake: "The Winter King" – Alex Small-Butera; The Amazing Digital Circus: "Pilot" – Kevin Temmer; Kizazi Moto: Generation Fire: "Moremi, Surf Sangoma, Stardust" – Andre DeVilliers; Star Wars: Visions: "I Am Your Mother" – Laurie Sitzia	The Boy and the Heron – Takeshi Honda; Elemental – Jessica Torres; Nimona – Toby Seale; Ruby Gillman, Teenage Kraken – Prashanth Cavale; Suzume – Kenichi Tsuchiya
Outstanding Achievement for Character Animation in a Live Action Production	Outstanding Achievement for Character Animation in a Video Game
Guardians of the Galaxy Vol. 3 – Fernando Herrera, Chris Hurtt, Nathan McConnel, Daniel Cabral, and Chris McGaw; Ahsoka – Rick O'Connor, Mike Beaulieu, Stewart Alves, Kevin Reuter, and Wai Kit Wan; Cocaine Bear – Carmelo Leggiero, Steve Braggs, Kevin Kelm, Cedric Enriquez Canlas, and Kane Elferink; The Little Mermaid – Pablo Grillo, Kayn Garcia, Ferran Casas, Stuart Ellis, and Joseph Lewis; Transformers: Rise of the Beasts – Kevin Estey, Kai-Hua Lan, Blaine Toderian, Richard John Moore, and Joseph C.K Leong	Marvel's Spider-Man 2 – Insomniac Games Animation Team (Insomniac Games); Atomic Heart – Mundfish Animation Team (Mundfish); Hogwarts Legacy – Tara Edwards (Avalanche Software); Let's! Revolution – BUCK Animation Team (BUCK); Teslagrad 2 – Aslak Helgesen (Rain Games)
Outstanding Achievement for Character Design in an Animated Television / Broadcast Production	Outstanding Achievement for Character Design in an Animated Feature Production
Marvel's Moon Girl and Devil Dinosaur: "The Beyonder" – Jose Lopez; Clone High: "Let's Try This Again" – Tara Billinger; Jessica's Big Little World: "Bedtime Routine" – Nick Winn; Kizazi Moto: Generation Fire: "You Give Me Heart" – Lesego Vorester; Spirit Rangers: "Water Protectors" – Marie Delmas	Spider-Man: Across the Spider-Verse – Jesús Alonso Iglesias; Elemental – Maria Yi; Merry Little Batman – Nikolas Ilic; Nimona – Aidan Sugano; Robot Dreams – Daniel Fernandez Casas
Outstanding Achievement for Directing in an Animated Television / Broadcast Production	Outstanding Achievement for Directing in an Animated Feature Production
Star Wars: Visions: "Screecher's Reach" – Paul Young; Kizazi Moto: Generation Fire: "Moremi" – Shofela Coker and Andrew McNally; My Dad the Bounty Hunter: "Bizarre Ride" – Kenji Ono, Kai Akira, and Patrick Harpin; Pokémon Concierge: "What's on Your Mind, Psyduck?" – Iku Ogawa; Scavengers Reign: "The Fall" – Diego Porral	Spider-Man: Across the Spider-Verse – Joaquim Dos Santos, Kemp Powers, and Justin K. Thompson; The Boy and the Heron – Hayao Miyazaki; Nimona – Nick Bruno and Troy Quane; Robot Dreams – Pablo Berger and Benoît Feroumont; Teenage Mutant Ninja Turtles: Mutant Mayhem – Jeff Rowe and Kyler Spears
Outstanding Achievement for Editorial in an Animated Television / Broadcast Production	Outstanding Achievement for Editorial in an Animated Feature Production
Blue Eye Samurai: "The Tale of the Ronin and the Bride" – Yuka Shirasuna; Hilda: "Chapter 6: The Forgotten Lake" – John Mckinnon and Mike Stefanelli; I Am Groot: "Groot's Snow Day" – Dan Urrutia; The Legend of Vox Machina: "The Sunken Tomb" – Todd Raleigh and Joelle Kristie; Star Wars: Visions: "Screecher's Reach" – Richie Cody, ACE, BFE	Spider-Man: Across the Spider-Verse – Spider-Man: Across the Spider-Verse Editorial Team (Michael Andrews, Andrew Leviton, R. Chett Hoffman, Erika Scopelli, Nina Lentini, Freddy Ferrari); Elemental – Stephen Schaffer, Amera Rizk, Gregory Snyder, Jen Jew, and Kevin Rose-Williams; Leo – Patrick Voetberg, Joseph Titone, Darrian M. James, Danny Miller, and Brian Robinson; Nimona – Randy Trager, Erin Crackel, Stephen Schwartz, and Ashley Calle; Teenage Mutant Ninja Turtles: Mutant Mayhem – Greg Levitan, Illya Quinteros, David and Croomes, and Myra Owyang
Outstanding Achievement for Music in an Animated Television / Broadcast Production	Outstanding Achievement for Music in an Animated Feature Production
Star Wars: Visions: "Aau's Song" – Markus Wormstorm, Nadia Darries, and Dineo du Toit; Animaniacs: "Talladega Mice" – Steven Bernstein and Julie Bernstein; Babylon 5: The Road Home – Michael McCuistion, Kristopher Carter, and Lolita Ritmanis; Pacemaker – Christopher Lennertz; The Smeds and The Smoos – René Aubry	Spider-Man: Across the Spider-Verse – Daniel Pemberton and Metro Boomin; The Boy and the Heron – Joe Hisaishi; Elemental – Thomas Newman and Ari "LAUV" Leff; Suzume – Kazuma Jinnouchi and RADWIMPS; Teenage Mutant Ninja Turtles: Mutant Mayhem – Trent Reznor and Atticus Ross
Outstanding Achievement for Production Design in an Animated Television / Broadcast Production	Outstanding Achievement for Production Design in an Animated Feature Production
Blue Eye Samurai: "The Great Fire of 1657" – Toby Wilson, James Wilson, and Emil Mitev; Blue Eye Samurai: "Hammerscale" – Jason Scheier; Scavengers Reign: "The Storm" – Charles Huettner, Jonathan Djob Nkondo, Pauline Mauvière, Hugo Moreno, and Jon Juarez; Star Wars: Visions: "Sith" – Carlos Salgado; What If...?: "What If... Nebula Joined the Nova Corps?" – Paul Lasaine, Kristina Vardazaryan, Cynthia Halley, Ryan Magno, and Simon Dunsdon	Spider-Man: Across the Spider-Verse – Patrick O'Keefe and Dean Gordon; The Boy and the Heron – Yoji Takeshige; Elemental – Don Shank, Maria Yi, Dan Holland, Jennifer Chang, and Laura Meyer; Nimona – Aidan Sugano and Jeff Turley; Teenage Mutant Ninja Turtles: Mutant Mayhem – Yashar Kassai, Arthur, and Tiffany Lam
Outstanding Achievement for Storyboarding in an Animated Television / Broadcast Production	Outstanding Achievement for Storyboarding in an Animated Feature Production
Marvel's Moon Girl and Devil Dinosaur: "Goodnight Moon Girl" – Ben Juwono; Craig Before The Creek – Erik Fountain; Fright Krewe: "The Blood Awakening, Part 1" – Leah Artwick; Gremlins: Secrets of the Mogwai: "Never Give Up" – Kristine Lee; Kung Fu Panda: The Dragon Knight: "Apok-ta-pokalypse Now, Part II" – Grace Liu	The Boy and the Heron – Hayao Miyazaki; Chicken Run: Dawn of the Nugget – Richard Phelan; Nimona – Esteban Bravo; Robot Dreams – Maca Gil; Suzume – Makoto Shinkai
Outstanding Achievement for Voice Acting in an Animated Television / Broadcast Production	Outstanding Achievement for Voice Acting in an Animated Feature Production
Diamond White as Lunella Lafayette / Moon Girl in Marvel's Moon Girl and Devil Dinosaur: "Moon Girl Landing"; Aisha Tyler as Lana Kane in Archer: "Keys Open Doors"; Alex Lawther as Velveteen Rabbit in The Velveteen Rabbit; Dan Stevens as Korvo in Solar Opposites: "The Re-Visibility Bouillabaisse"; Vico Ortiz as Serena in Craig Before The Creek	Chloë Grace Moretz as Nimona in Nimona; David Hornsby as Joker in Merry Little Batman; Hokuto Matsumura as Souta Munakata in Suzume; Jack Black as Bowser in The Super Mario Bros. Movie; Tresi Gazal as Gwen in Migration
Outstanding Achievement for Writing in an Animated Television / Broadcast Production	Outstanding Achievement for Writing in an Animated Feature Production
Blue Eye Samurai: "The Tale of the Ronin and the Bride" – Amber Noizumi; Only You: An Animated Shorts Collection: "Yellowbird" – Tsvetelina Zdraveva and Jerred North; Rock Paper Scissors: "Birthday Police" – Josh Lehrman, Kyle Stegina, Aram Spencer Porter, Julia Prescott and Mike Trapp; Rosie's Rules: "Time Trouble" – Leyani Diaz and Maria Escobedo; Scavengers Reign: "The Reunion" – Sean Buckelew	Nimona – Robert L. Baird and Lloyd Taylor; The Boy and the Heron – Hayao Miyazaki; Robot Dreams – Pablo Berger; Suzume – Makoto Shinkai; Teenage Mutant Ninja Turtles: Mutant Mayhem – Seth Rogen, Evan Goldberg, Jeff Rowe, Dan Hernandez, and Benji Samit

== Juried awards ==
=== June Foray Award ===
- BRIC Foundation (Alison Mann and Nicole Hendrix, co-founders)

=== The Special Achievement Award ===
- The Artists of Walt Disney Animation

=== Ub Iwerks Award ===
- John Oxberry (posthumously)

=== Winsor McCay Lifetime Achievement Awards ===
- Charlotte "Lotte" Reiniger (posthumously)
- Joe Hisaishi
- Marcy Page

== Multiple awards and nominations ==
=== Films ===
The following films received multiple nominations:

Nominations	Film
9	Nimona
7	Spider-Man: Across the Spider-Verse
7	The Boy and the Heron
7	Suzume
6	Elemental
6	Teenage Mutant Ninja Turtles: Mutant Mayhem
5	Robot Dreams
2	Chicken Run: Dawn of the Nugget
2	Merry Little Batman

The following films received multiple awards:

Wins	Film
7	Spider-Man: Across the Spider-Verse
2	The Boy and the Heron
2	Nimona

=== Television/Broadcast ===
The following shows received multiple nominations:

Nominations	Show
7	Blue Eye Samurai
6	Star Wars: Visions
5	Kizazi Moto: Generation Fire
4	Marvel's Moon Girl and Devil Dinosaur
4	Scavengers Reign
2	What If...?
2	Hilda

The following shows received multiple awards:

Wins	Show
6	Blue Eye Samurai
3	Marvel's Moon Girl and Devil Dinosaur
2	Star Wars: Visions
