= Michael Rose (film producer) =

Film producer

Michael Rose OBE
- Born: 14 September 1961 (age 64)
- Occupation: Film producer
- Known for: Joint MD and co-founder of Magic Light Pictures

Michael Peter Rose OBE (born 14 September 1961) is a British film producer and co-founder of Magic Light Pictures, a London-based independent film production company.

In the 2023 Birthday Honours, Rose was appointed Officer of the Order of the British Empire (OBE) for services to Animation.

== Career ==
Rose began his career running the cinemas at the Bristol's Watershed Media Centre and Arnolfini Gallery in the 1980s. He worked with Channel Four Television and later joined Aardman Animations in 1994 as Head of Development.

Rose headed the feature film division of Aardman Animations and was executive producer for animated films such as Chicken Run and the Oscar and BAFTA-winning Wallace & Gromit: The Curse of the Were-Rabbit. Rose also produced the 1995 Oscar-winning Wallace & Gromit film, A Close Shave, directed by Nick Park.

In 2003 Rose, alongside producer Martin Pope, co-founded Magic Light Pictures, a London-based independent film production company which produced animated films including The Gruffalo and The Snail and the Whale, which was nominated for 4 Oscars and won 4 BAFTAs.

== Filmography ==
Rose has several film productions to his credit:

=== Selected Productions ===
Year	Production	Role
1995	A Close Shave (film)	Producer
2000	Chicken Run (film)	Executive Producer
2005	Wallace & Gromit: The Curse of the Were-Rabbit (film)	Executive Producer
2007	Sparkle (film)	Producer
2009	The Gruffalo (film)	Producer
2010	Wild Target (film)	Producer
2010	Chico and Rita (film)	Producer
2011	The Gruffalo's Child (film)	Producer
2011	One Life (wildlife documentary)	Producer
2012	Room on the Broom (film)	Producer
2015	Stick Man (film)	Producer
2016	Revolting Rhymes (film)	Producer
2017	The Highway Rat (film)	Producer
2018	Zog (film)	Producer
2019	The Snail and the Whale (film)	Producer
2020	Zog and the Flying Doctors (film)	Producer
2021	Superworm (film)	Executive Producer
2021-2023	Pip and Posy (TV series, 105 episodes)	Executive Producer
2023	The Smeds and the Smoos (film)	Executive Producer
2023	Tabby McTat (film)	Producer

== See also ==
- A Close Shave
- Magic Light Pictures
