= Martin Pope (film producer) =

British film producer

- Born: 1961 (age 64–65)
- Occupation: Film producer

Martin Pope (born 1961) is a British film producer and co-founder of Magic Light Pictures, a London-based independent film production company.

== Career ==
Pope began his career directing Fringe theatre before joining BBC TV Drama, first in production roles and subsequently as a script editor and producer. He script-edited Blore MP and 102 Boulevard Haussmann, before deputising for Innes Lloyd on Alan Bennett’s A Question of Attribution, directed by John Schlesinger.

Pope went on to produce The Soldier, directed by Jean Stewart, Meat directed by John Madden and Harwant Bains’s Two Oranges and a Mango directed by Lindsay Posner.

In 1994, Pope set up an independent company to produce, among others the feature film the feature film Alive and Kicking, BIFA, Evening Standard and Europa Cinema award winning The Heart of Me, BIFA and Evening Standard Award winner Lawless Heart and Sundance hit, Touch of Pink by Ian Iqbal Rashid.,

In 2003 Pope, alongside producer Michael Rose, co-founded Magic Light Pictures, a London-based independent film production company which has produced films including The Gruffalo and The Snail and the Whale,. Their work at Magic Light has been nominated for 4 Oscars and won 4 BAFTAs and 5 International Emmy awards and a Children’s and Family Emmy (2025).

== Filmography ==
=== Selected Productions ===
Year	Production	Role
1993	The Soldier (film)	Producer
1994	The Soldier (TV Series)	Producer
1991-1994	Screen One (TV series)	Assistant Producer
1996	Indian Summer (film)	Producer
1999	The Turn of the Screw (film)	Producer
2001	Lawless Heart (film)	Producer
2002	Stag (Short film)	Producer
2002	The Heart of Me (film)	Producer
2004	Touch of Pink (Film)	Producer
2007	Sparkle (film)	Producer
2009	The Gruffalo (film)	Producer
2010	Wild Target (film)	Producer
2010	Chico and Rita (film)	Producer
2011	The Gruffalo's Child (film)	Producer
2011	One Life (wildlife documentary)	Producer
2012	Room on the Broom (film)	Producer
2015	Stick Man (film)	Producer
2016	Revolting Rhymes (film)	Producer
2017	The Highway Rat (film)	Producer
2018	Zog (film)	Producer
2019	The Snail and the Whale (film)	Producer
2020	Zog and the Flying Doctors (film)	Producer
2021	Superworm (film)	Producer
2021-2023	Pip and Posy (TV series, 105 episodes)	Executive Producer
2023	The Smeds and the Smoos (film)	Producer
2023	Tabby McTat (film)	Executive Producer
2023	The Velveteen Rabbit (film)	Producer
2024	Tiddler (film)	Producer

== See also ==
- Magic Light Pictures
