= The Snail and the Whale (film) =

- Poster for The Snail and the Whale
- Based on: The Snail and the Whale by Julia Donaldson and Axel Scheffler
- Written by: Max Lang; Suzanne Lang
- Directed by: Max Lang; Daniel Snaddon
- Starring: Sally Hawkins; Rob Brydon; Cariad Lloyd; Emma Tate; Arnold Brown; Max Lang
- Narrated by: Diana Rigg
- Theme music composer: René Aubry
- Countries of origin: United Kingdom; South Africa; Germany
- Original language: English

Production
- Producers: Martin Pope; Michael Rose
- Running time: 30 minutes (approx.)
- Production companies: Magic Light Pictures; Triggerfish Animation Studios; ZDF; BBC

Original release
- Network: BBC One
- Release: 25 December 2019

The Snail and the Whale is a 2019 short computer-animated TV film, directed by Max Lang and Daniel Snaddon, and produced by Michael Rose and Martin Pope of Magic Light Pictures, in association with ZDF, BBC and Triggerfish Animation Studios where the film was animated.

The short film is based on the 2003 picture book written by Julia Donaldson and illustrated by Axel Scheffler. The voices of the main characters include Dame Diana Rigg, Sally Hawkins and Rob Brydon. The special premiered on BBC One in the United Kingdom for Christmas 2019.

== Plot ==
The Snail and the Whale follows the journey of a tiny sea snail who longs to see the world and hitches a ride on the tail of a friendly humpback whale.

== Voice cast ==
- Diana Rigg as Narrator
- Sally Hawkins as Snail
- Rob Brydon as Humpback whale
- Cariad Lloyd as Teacher
- Arnold Brown and Emma Tate as the snail flock
- Max Lang as the Fish in the Sea
- William Barber, David Cummings, Charlotte-Davis Black, Emmy Dowers and Mia Wilks as the school children

== Broadcast ==
The special premiered on BBC One on Christmas Day 2019 and was watched by four million viewers.

== Accolades ==
Year	Presenter/Festival	Award/Category	Status
2020	New York International Children's Film Festival	Audience Award, Ages 3–5	Won
2020	British Animation Awards	Best Voice Performance (Sally Hawkins)	Won
2020	Banff Rockie Awards	Best Children's Animation	Won
2020	Venice TV Awards	Children/Youth	Won
2020	Sapporo International Short Film Festival & Market	Action / Adventure	Won
2020	British Animation Awards	Best Longform and Best Use of Sound	Nominated
2020	Annecy International Animation Film Festival	TV category	Nominated
2020	Cleveland International Film Festival	Official Selection	Nominated
2020	Annie Awards	Best Animated Special Production	Won
2022	British Academy Children's Awards	Animation	Won
2022	British Academy Children's Awards	Best Director (Max Lang, Daniel Snaddon)	Won
2022	British Academy Children's Awards	Best Writer (Max Lang, Suzanne Lang)	Nominated
