= Jan Lachauer =

German filmmaker and animator

Jan Lachauer (born 1983 in Munich) is a film maker and animator from Germany. Lachauer and fellow producer Max Lang were nominated for an Academy Award for Best Animated Short Film for the film Room on the Broom. He was nominated a second time in the same category in 2017 for the film Revolting Rhymes, alongside his co-director & co-writer Jakob Schuh.
