= Superworm (film) =

2021 British short film

- Directed by: Jac Hamman; Sarah Scrimgeour
- Written by: Max Lang; Suzanne Lang
- Based on: Superworm by Julia Donaldson
- Produced by: Martin Pope; Barney Goodland
- Starring: Olivia Colman; Matt Smith; Patricia Allison; Kobna Holdbrook-Smith; Rob Brydon; Paul Thornley; Cariad Lloyd
- Edited by: Robin Sales
- Music by: René Aubry
- Production companies: Magic Light Pictures; Blue Zoo Animation Studio
- Distributed by: BBC; ZDF
- Release date: 25 December 2021 (BBC One)
- Running time: 25 minutes
- Country: United Kingdom
- Language: English

Superworm is a 2021 British short computer animated TV film based on the 2012 picture book of the same name written by Julia Donaldson and illustrated by Axel Scheffler. Directed by Jac Hamman and Sarah Scrimgeour, the film was produced by Martin Pope and Barney Goodland of Magic Light Pictures and was adapted from the book by Max Lang and Suzanne Lang, with the score composed by René Aubry.

The film follows a titular character who helps his friends when they get in trouble, until one day the evil Wizard Lizard has him kidnapped and Superworm's friends have to save their hero.

The film stars Olivia Colman, Matt Smith, Rob Brydon, Kobna Holdbrook-Smith, Patricia Allison and Cariad Lloyd. The film was first broadcast on BBC One on 25 December 2021.

== Plot ==
Superworm, a super-strong and long worm, trains to become a superhero. He is joined by a caterpillar, who eventually enters a cocoon, while Superworm continues training.

When the caterpillar leaves her cocoon as a butterfly, she helps Superworm gain notoriety due to a series of heroic acts (saving a toad from being run over by a truck, entertaining a swarm of bored bees, and saving a drowning beetle), thought Butterfly is upset when Superworm is given sole credit for his good deeds.

While the fellow garden insects celebrate Superworm's rescues, Wizard Lizard, digging for treasure nearby, overhears the commotion and orders his servant crow to retrieve Superworm. The crow kidnaps Superworm and brings him to the Wizard, who casts a spell on the hero so he will dig for treasure for the Wizard. Butterfly overhears this and rallies the garden insects to rescue Superworm.

Sneaking to the Wizard's lair, the garden creatures incapacitate him, wrap him a cobweb and throw him into a nearby rubbish dump. They search for Superworm, but to no avail. When Butterfly and the other creatures have given up hope of finding their hero, Superworm bursts out of the ground, before reconciling with Butterfly.

When the insects return to their homes, the crow attacks again, but Butterfly and Superworm incapacitate the bird and slingshot him away. The insects celebrate their victory and the return of their hero.

== Voice cast ==
- Olivia Colman as the narrator
- Matt Smith as Superworm
- Patricia Allison as Butterfly
- Kobna Holdbrook-Smith as Wizard Lizard
- Rob Brydon as Crow
- Paul Thornley as Papa Toad & Beetle
- Cariad Lloyd as Mama Toad
- Felix Tandon as Baby Toad
- Samara Sutariya as Skipping Beetle
- Lizzie Waterworth-Santo as Spider

== Production ==
Donaldson found the cast of A-list actors to be "brilliant, they’re all so good" but admitted that she had not initially heard of them before. The directors, Jac Hamman and Sarah Scrimgeour, had worked with Magic Light Pictures on their holiday specials starting with the 2015 short film for Stick Man, and were attracted to adapting Superworm for film because the work was an "adventure comedy where the protagonist is an earthworm with a hero complex".

Storyboarding and pre-production of Superworm began during the COVID-19 pandemic in April 2020. As the directors were based in South Africa and the studios were based in the United Kingdom, they had to work together remotely through video calls. Studio co-founders Martin Pope and Michael Rose were not able to make film set visits. The voice recording was also restricted, as they were only allowed to have one actor with the engineer in the room when they began the recording process. The production and post-production phases were completed in September 2020 and November 2021, respectively. The team included more than 100 people. The software Autodesk Maya was mainly used for animation, while ZBrush, Substance 3D Modeler and Redshift were also used for the film.

== Reception ==
Helen Brown of The Daily Telegraph gave the film a positive review. The Independent's Ed Cumming gave the film four out of five stars and wrote that it "maintains its charm without diluting the original book".
