= René Aubry =

French composer

- Born: René Aubry; 20 December 1956 (age 69); Remiremont, France
- Genres: Classical, incidental
- Occupations: Musician, composer
- Instruments: Guitar, mandolin, bouzouki, banjo, accordion
- Label: Wagram
- Website: reneaubry.fr

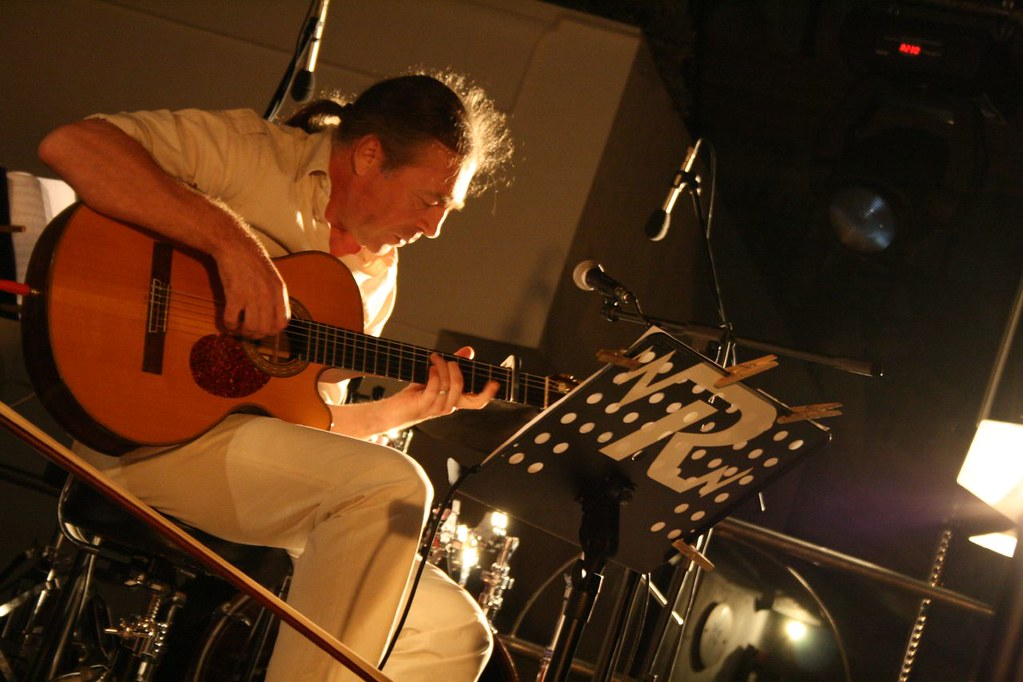

René Aubry (born 20 December 1956) is a French composer. He is a multi-instrumentalist known for blending classical harmonies with modern instrumentation. Aubry has composed for choreographers such as Carolyn Carlson and Pina Bausch. He has scored for films, including several adaptations of books by Julia Donaldson, and released many of his own albums.

== Discography ==
- René Aubry (1983)
- Chrysalide (1987)
- Libre parcours (1988)
- Derives (1989)
- Steppe (1990)
- La révolte des enfants (1991)
- Après la pluie (1993)
- Killer Kid (1994)
- Ne m'oublie pas (1995)
- Signes (1997)
- Plaisirs d'amour (1998)
- Invités sur la terre (2001)
- Seuls au monde (2003)
- Projection privée (2004)
- Mémoires du futur (2006)
- Play time (2008)
- Refuges (2011)
- Forget Me Not (2013)
- Days (2014)
- Now (2015)
- Chaos (2017)
- Petits sauts délicats avec grand écart (2018)
- Give Me a Chance for Another Dance (2025)
- Questions (2026)

=== Soundtracks ===
- The Gruffalo (2009)
- The Gruffalo's Child (2011)
- Room on the Broom (2012)
- Chic! (2015)
- Stick Man (2015)
- The Highway Rat (2017)
- Zog (2018)
- The Bears' Famous Invasion of Sicily (2019)
- The Snail and the Whale (2019)
- Zog and the Flying Doctors (2020)
- Superworm (2021)
- The Smeds and the Smoos (2022)
- Tabby McTat (2023)
