= Room on the Broom (film) =

Animated short film

- Genre: Children's; Fantasy
- Based on: Room on the Broom by Julia Donaldson
- Written by: Julia Donaldson; Axel Scheffler
- Story by: Julia Donaldson
- Directed by: Max Lang; Jan Lachauer
- Voices of: Gillian Anderson; Rob Brydon; Timothy Spall; Martin Clunes; Sally Hawkins; David Walliams
- Narrated by: Simon Pegg
- Theme music composer: René Aubry
- Countries of origin: United Kingdom; Germany
- Original languages: English; German

Production
- Producers: Martin Pope; Michael Rose
- Cinematography: Pepi Lenzi
- Editor: Robin Sales
- Running time: 30 minutes
- Production companies: Orange Eyes Limited; Magic Light Pictures; Studio Soi; BBC

Original release
- Network: BBC One
- Release: 25 December 2012

Room on the Broom is a 2012 short stop motion computer animated television film based on the picture book written by Julia Donaldson and illustrated by Axel Scheffler. The film was nominated for the Best Animated Short Film at the 2014 Academy Awards. It also won the British Academy Children's Award for Animation in 2013.

Directed by Max Lang and Jan Lachauer, the film was produced by Martin Pope and Michael Rose of Magic Light Pictures, London, in association with Orange Eyes Limited.

It was first broadcast on BBC One 25 December 2012 before being released on DVD in March 2013 by Magic Light Pictures. It then aired in the United States on PBS Kids Sprout as a Halloween special, on 30 October 2013, and then aired in the United States on PBS Kids as a Christmas special, from 1 December 2017 to 9 December 2018.

On 14 November 2026, the film was pulled from BBC iPlayer following allegations of sexual assault made against cast member David Walliams.

== Plot ==
The film follows a witch and her cat, who fly together on their broomstick. One morning, the witch casts a spell that causes an explosion, awaking a nearby dragon. The witch and the cat then fly away together.

While flying, the witch drops her hat into a forest, so the two land to find it. Eventually, a dog returns the hat to them, and the witch allows him to ride the broomstick with them, to the cat's chagrin.

The three fly some more, until the bow in the witch's plait falls into a field, so the three land to find it. A green bird, outcast from the other birds, returns the bow to them, and the witch allows her to ride the broomstick with them, annoying the cat more.

They fly further, but the witch drops her wand into some reeds, and they land the broomstick to find it. A frog returns the wand to them and the witch allows him to ride the broomstick, further frustrating the cat.

While flying over mountains, the combined weight of the five causes the broom to snap in half, dropping the animals into a bog and sending the witch flying into a cloud, where the dragon (having followed her) announces his plan to eat her as "witch and chips" for dinner. After a brief chase, the dragon catches the witch, who faints.

Before the dragon can eat the witch, however, a monster appears out of the bog and claims the witch for itself. The terrified dragon flees, and the monster is revealed to be the animals in disguise. The dog, bird and frog accept that the broom can only hold the weight of two of them and prepare to leave the witch and cat, but the witch, using a new spell, creates a new broom that accommodates all of them, and the five fly away together.

== Voice cast ==
- Simon Pegg as Narrator
- Gillian Anderson as Witch
- Rob Brydon as Cat
- Timothy Spall as Dragon
- Martin Clunes as Dog
- Sally Hawkins as Bird
- David Walliams as Frog

== See also ==
- List of films about witchcraft
- The Gruffalo
- The Gruffalo's Child
- Stick Man
- The Highway Rat
