= Phoenix Laroche =

British actor

- Born: 2012/2013
- Years active: 2021–present

Phoenix Laroche (born 2012) is an English actor. For his performance in the film The Velveteen Rabbit (2023), he won a Children's and Family Emmy Award. His films since include The Magic Faraway Tree (2026). On television, he appeared in the Amazon Prime series Malice (2025).

== Early life ==
Laroche is the elder son of filmmaker Mat Laroche and magazine picture editor Zoe Gahan. He spent the first two years of his life on a houseboat in Kensal Rise before his family moved into a house in Cricklewood, North West London. In 2020, the family relocated to Sedgemoor, Somerset. Laroche attended Hazlegrove Preparatory School.

== Career ==
Laroche made his television debut in a 2021 episode of the Apple TV+ series Trying. He then appeared in the Hallmark Channel films The Royal Nanny and Joyeux Noel in 2022 and 2023 respectively.

Also in 2023, Laroche made his feature film debut starring as William in an adaptation of The Velveteen Rabbit. The film was released on Apple TV+. For his performance, Laroche won the Children's and Family Emmy Award for Outstanding Younger Performer.

In 2025, Laroche played Dexter Tanner in the Amazon Prime series Malice, for which he was nominated for a Young Artist Award. The following year, Laroche had roles as Joe Thompson in the film The Magic Faraway Tree and Cedric Chalfont and young Eliot Crace (played by Jamie Blackley as an adult) in the BBC and PBS series Marble Hall Murders.

== Filmography ==
=== Film ===
Year	Title	Role	Notes
2023	The Velveteen Rabbit	William	
2026	The Magic Faraway Tree	Joseph "Joe" Thompson	
2027	The Resurrection of the Christ: Part One		

=== Television ===
Year	Title	Role	Notes
2021	Trying	Ethan	Episode: "The Sun on Your Back"
2022	The Royal Nanny	Prince Robert	Television film
2023	Joyeux Noel	French Boy	Television film
2025	Malice	Dexter Tanner	6 episodes
2026	Marble Hall Murders	Young Eliot Crace / Cedric Chalfont	6 episodes
2026	The Party	Barnaby Fitzmaurice	2 episodes

== Awards and nominations ==
Year	Award	Category	Work	Result	Ref.
2025	Children's and Family Emmy Awards	Outstanding Younger Performer	The Velveteen Rabbit	Won	
2026	Young Artist Awards	Best Leading Performance by a Young Artist in a Streaming Series	Malice	Nominated	
