= Shape Island =

American children's television series

- Genre: Comedy; Children's; Science fiction; Fantasy; Stop motion
- Created by: Mac Barnett; Jon Klassen
- Based on: Triangle, Square, and Circle by: Mac Barnett; illustrated by Jon Klassen
- Directed by: Drew Hodges
- Voices of: Harvey Guillén; Gideon Adlon; Scott Adsit
- Narrated by: Yvette Nicole Brown
- Composer: Andrew Carroll
- Countries of origin: United States; United Kingdom
- Original language: English
- No. of seasons: 2
- No. of episodes: 18

Production
- Executive producers: Mac Barnett; Kelli Bixler; Drew Hodges; Jon Klassen
- Producers: Matthew Cuny; Jodi Downs
- Cinematography: Eric Adkins
- Editor: Guy Handelman
- Running time: 22–24 minutes (roughly 11 minutes per segment)
- Production companies: Bix Pix Entertainment; Apple Studios

Original release
- Network: Apple TV+
- Release: January 20, 2023 – August 29, 2025

Shape Island is an American animated stop-motion children's television series based on the children's books Triangle, Circle, and Square written by Mac Barnett and illustrated by Jon Klassen. It features Harvey Guillén as the voice of Square, Gideon Adlon as the voice of Circle, and Scott Adsit as the voice of Triangle. Shape Island is a co-production between Bix Pix Entertainment and Apple Studios. Each episode has two animated segments per half-hour episode. The show premiered on Apple TV+ on January 20, 2023, where it is available to stream. A Halloween special was released on October 20, 2023 and a Winter special was released on December 1, 2023.

A second season was released on August 29, 2025.

== Premise ==
Set on a fictional island, the series follows the story of three minimalistic anthropomorphic shapes: Square, Circle, and Triangle. Each shape has a unique personality that often tests each other's patience, but their friendship is maintained throughout the series.

== Characters ==
The three main characters in Shape Island.

- Square (voiced by Harvey Guillén) is a cube. He is the most fastidious of the shapes, but always rises to the occasion when called upon for action. He pushes blocks around for a living and likes order and routine.
- Circle (voiced by Gideon Adlon) is a sphere. She is the oldest, most powerful, idyllic and wisest shape on the island. Unlike the other two shapes, Circle has magic powers. For example, she can fly, grow very large, and has telekinesis.
- Triangle (voiced by Scott Adsit) is a pyramid. He is the messiest, silliest, and most disorganized of the shapes. These personality traits often put him in conflict with Square.

The show is narrated by Yvette Nicole Brown.

== Production ==
Executive producers Mac Barnett and Jon Klassen always envisioned their children's book trilogy as a children's television series. The characters in the series, like in the books, are complex and driven by their personalities instead of plot or themes. In that regard, the writers were influenced by the structure of the sitcom Seinfeld. Sesame Street was another major influence.

Stop-motion animation was chosen to give the show a three-dimensional feel that is simple, not out of reach, and recognizable to children. Emmy and Annie Award-winning animation studio Bix Pix Entertainment joined the series. The writers faced challenges in adapting the books to screen, but they were able to overcome these difficulties by working closely with the production team at Bix Pix Entertainment. Director and executive producer Drew Hodges explained, "In the books, there is a lot of negative space on the page that the reader gets to fill in with their imagination. The books convey so much with very few images. But we had to fill that space with physical sets and props." It took two and a half years to produce the first season of the show, plus an additional four-to-five years of developing and pitching the show. Due to the laborious process of stop motion animation, the production schedule was about 20 months.

Barnett described the voice actors as "gifted comedians" and the experience of working with them was enjoyable to him. Harvey Guillén explained how he developed the voice of Square: "We knew that we wanted Square to be very empathetic, very endearing and sweet, and not causing too much trouble, always playing by the rules, but also to show that we could relate to him. We could be on his side. So, even though he goes through challenges, we relate to him as well." Reflecting on her role as the Narrator, Yvette Nicole Brown said:

“[T]his is my favorite show that I've done voiceover for. Every time I would get a call where they need you to do more Shape, I'm like, let's go win-win, because it's just relaxing and I get to be silly ... and they just let me. It's like a warm hug. You just kind of lay in there and you tell the story. So this is my favorite voiceover to do and it's one of my favorite shows to watch because it's just so beautiful and just soulful. It's just a soulful, sweet show."

Due to their busy schedules, the actors often recorded their parts separately from each other.

In discussing the show's second season, Barnett and Klassen explained that they wanted the new episodes to feel like spending time with old friends while also exploring fresh directions. Klassen described Season 1 as a learning process and Season 2 as a chance to experiment with more ambitious storytelling. Production on the first two seasons overlapped.

== Episodes ==
=== Season 1 (2023) ===
No.	Title	Directed by	Written by	Original release date
1	"Square's Very Kind Gesture"	Drew Hodges	Toby Jones	January 20, 2023
1	"The Eclipse"	Drew Hodges	Niki Yang	January 20, 2023
Square makes a mistake of sharing rare bananas. Square and Triangle attempt to keep a secret from Circle.
2	"Square's Big Prank"	Drew Hodges	Ryan Pequin	January 20, 2023
2	"Circle's Plan Falls Apart"	Drew Hodges	Mac Barnett & Jon Klassen	January 20, 2023
Eager to outwit Triangle, Square plans a sneaky surprise. Circle searches for answers when a critter kidnaps her prized plant.
3	"Triangle Gets Carried Away"	Drew Hodges	Mac Barnett & Jon Klassen	January 20, 2023
3	"Square's Different Day"	Drew Hodges	Mac Barnett & Jon Klassen	January 20, 2023
A simple plan leads to an enormous project for Triangle. Square works on a sculpture of Circle.
4	"Triangle Day"	Drew Hodges	Mamoudou N'Diaye	January 20, 2023
4	"The Storm"	Drew Hodges	Maddie Queripel	January 20, 2023
Square and Circle learn how to celebrate a unique holiday. An approaching storm excites Triangle and worries his friends Square and Circle.
5	"Message in a Bottle"	Drew Hodges	Sam Spina	January 20, 2023
5	"Square's Special Place"	Drew Hodges	Toby Jones	January 20, 2023
Square and Triangle find mysterious bottles on the beach. While playing hide-and-seek, Square discovers a peaceful spot.
6	"Triangle Goes Solo"	Drew Hodges	Louise Rozett	January 20, 2023
6	"Circle Makes a Mistake"	Drew Hodges	Ryan Pequin	January 20, 2023
The fearless Triangle sets out on his own. Circle leads a journey to ancient ruins and unexpectedly runs into trouble.
7	"Square's Sleepover"	Drew Hodges	Sam Spina	January 20, 2023
7	"Growing Pains"	Drew Hodges	Alex Horab	January 20, 2023
A change of plans test Square's patience. Circle helps Square start a garden, but she struggles with his instant success.
8	"Triangle and Square's Big Game"	Drew Hodges	Mamoudou N'Diaye	January 20, 2023
8	"The Shooting Star"	Drew Hodges	Amanda Gotera	January 20, 2023
When Circle brushes off their game, Triangle and Square feel insecure. A mysterious meteor crash inspires a trek across the island.
9	"Creepy Cave Crawl"	Drew Hodges	Ryan Pequin	October 20, 2023
After Triangle pranks them, Circle and Square celebrate Halloween on their own with all treats and no tricks.
10	"The Winter Blues"	Drew Hodges	Amanda Gotera	December 1, 2023
The chilly season leaves Square feeling sad, so Circle and Triangle try to cheer him up by creating a new holiday: Yeti Night.

=== Season 2 (2025) ===
No.	Title	Directed by	Written by	Original release date
11	"Narrator's Big Day"	Drew Hodges	Toby Jones	August 29, 2025
11	"Square's Time Chest"	Drew Hodges	Niki Yang	August 29, 2025
The Shapes' rather ordinary day gives Narrator time to herself. Square struggles to find the perfect object for his time capsule.
12	"Glitter Pen"	Drew Hodges	Alex Horab	August 29, 2025
12	"Triangle's Allergy"	Drew Hodges	Niki Yang	August 29, 2025
Square feels guilty after trading away a gift from Circle. Square and Circle try to find the source of Triangle's allergies.
13	"Square's Missing Mug"	Drew Hodges	Shane Portman	August 29, 2025
13	"Triangle Stands Still"	Drew Hodges	Maddie Queripel	August 29, 2025
The disappearance of Square's favorite mug sends him on an island-wide hunt. Triangle bets Circle that he can meditate for 10 minutes.
14	"Circle's Roommate"	Drew Hodges	Alex Horab	August 29, 2025
14	"The Frog-Off"	Drew Hodges	Mamoudou N'Diaye	August 29, 2025
Circle wakes up to a surprise—and suddenly needs a place to stay. A new visitor to the island creates quite a stir.
15	"From Top to Bottom"	Drew Hodges	Shakira Pressley	August 29, 2025
15	"Circle's Equal"	Drew Hodges	Ryan Pequin	August 29, 2025
Circle, Square, and Triangle face off in a wild race for a tasty prize. Circle is thrilled to finally meet a Shape like her.
16	"The Perfect Gift"	Drew Hodges	Amanda Gotera	August 29, 2025
16	"Hat Couture"	Drew Hodges	Maddie Queripel	August 29, 2025
Triangle and Square follow a mysterious map, hoping to find treasure. Circle's hat design inspires her to make bigger, better creations.
17	"Triangle has Superpowers"	Drew Hodges	Shane Portman	August 29, 2025
17	"The Sound of Circle"	Drew Hodges	Taneka Stotts	August 29, 2025
After wishing on a "star," Triangle is convinced his wish has come true. Triangle and Square want Circle to join their band.
18	"The Big Tooth"	Drew Hodges	Amanda Gotera	August 29, 2025
18	"Picture Day"	Drew Hodges	Niki Yang	August 29, 2025
A teeny-tiny Circle is determined to prove she doesn't need help. The Shapes run into obstacles trying to take their annual photo.

== Release ==
The show premiered on Apple TV+ internationally in 2023.

== Reception ==
The show was praised by both television critics and parent guides. Common Sense Media wrote, "Aesthetically, the show has gorgeous visuals, stop-motion animation, and music. Grown-ups may also appreciate the slower pace and lower-key dialogue compared to many preschool series." Parents praised its themes "which touch on curiosity, experimentation, and creativity; outdoor, independent play; and peaceful conflict resolution, among other important social skills."

The show was recommended by The New York Times: "The show's sense of warmth extends beyond its attitude to its enchanting design; its sun-dappled beaches and glowing forest groves could bring Instagram to its knees, and Square could give an Architectural Digest tour of his Scandi-Bohemian minimalist kitchen." The Times also recommended the show's holiday special "The Winter Blues." Cult of Mac praised the show, specifically the writing, animation, and the voice cast: "Shape Island is marvelously animated, hysterically performed, carefully written and beautifully directed. It's a stop-motion home run for Apple TV+."

== Awards ==
Year	Award	Category	Recipients	Result
2023	Annecy International Animated Film Festival	Jury Award for a TV Series	Drew Hodges	Won
2023	2nd Children's and Family Emmy Awards	Visual Effects for a Live Action Program	Andrew Babick	Nominated
2023	2nd Children's and Family Emmy Awards	Outstanding Individual Achievement in Animation	Ellen Coons (animator)	Won
2024	51st Annie Awards	Best Special Production	"The Winter Blues"	Nominated
2024	51st Annie Awards	Best TV/Media - Children	"Square's Special Place"	Nominated
2025	Peabody Awards	Children & Youth	Bix Pix Entertainment in association with Apple	Nominated
2026	Imagen Awards	Best Voice-Over Actor	Harvey Guillén	Nominated
