= Malice (TV series) =

2025 British television series

- Genre: Psychological thriller
- Created by: James Wood
- Written by: James Wood
- Directed by: Mike Barker; Leonora Lonsdale
- Starring: Jack Whitehall; Carice van Houten; Christine Adams; Raza Jaffrey; David Duchovny
- Country of origin: United Kingdom
- Original language: English
- No. of series: 1
- No. of episodes: 6

Production
- Executive producers: Mike Barker; Tim Hincks; James Wood; Imogen Cooper
- Producer: Georgina Love
- Running time: 46–52 minutes
- Production companies: Expectation Entertainment; Tailspin Films; Amazon MGM Studios

Original release
- Network: Amazon Prime Video
- Release: 14 November 2025

Malice is a British psychological thriller television series created by James Wood for Amazon Prime Video, starring David Duchovny, Carice van Houten and Jack Whitehall. The series premiered on 14 November 2025.

== Premise ==
A tutor commences work for a wealthy family but his intentions may not be pure.

== Cast ==
=== Main ===
- Jack Whitehall as Adam Healey
- Carice van Houten as Nat Tanner, Jamie's wife
- Christine Adams as Jules, Nat’s best friend
- Raza Jaffrey as Damien, Jules’ husband
- David Duchovny as Jamie Tanner

=== Recurring ===
- Harry Gilby as Kit Tanner
- Teddie Allen as April Tanner
- Phoenix Laroche as Dexter Tanner
- Gloria Garcia as Niki Delgago
- Rianna Kellman as Harper
- Jade Khan as Milly
- Charlotte Riley as Sophie
- Anna Wilson-Jones as Rachel

== Episodes ==
No.	Title	Directed by	Written by	Original release date
1	"Episode 1"	Mike Barker	James Wood	14 November 2025
2	"Episode 2"	Mike Barker	James Wood	14 November 2025
3	"Episode 3"	Mike Barker	James Wood	14 November 2025
4	"Episode 4"	Leonora Lonsdale	James Wood	14 November 2025
5	"Episode 5"	Leonora Lonsdale	James Wood	14 November 2025
6	"Episode 6"	Mike Barker	James Wood	14 November 2025

== Production ==
The series is created, written and executive produced by James Wood. It is a co-production between Expectation Entertainment and Tailspin Films for Amazon Prime Video.

Filming took place over 18 weeks, starting in London in February 2024 and also taking place in Paros, and was completed in July 2024.

The cast is led by Jack Whitehall with David Duchovny and Carice van Houten. The younger cast includes Harry Gilby, Teddie Allen and Phoenix Laroche.

== Release ==
The series premiered with all six episodes on 14 November 2025.

== Reception ==
The series holds a 44% approval rating on review aggregator Rotten Tomatoes, based on 25 critic reviews. The website's critics consensus reads, "Severely lacking narrative momentum, this latest eat-the-rich caper only manages to strand its audience at sea with Malice." However, Lucy Mangan in The Guardian praised the show as "The White Lotus meets The Talented Mr Ripley... a great ride, and Whitehall acquits himself well in his first lead dramatic role".
