= The Smeds and the Smoos =

2022 animated film directed by Daniel Snaddon & Samantha Cutler

- Directed by: Daniel Snaddon; Samantha Cutler
- Screenplay by: Julia Donaldson; Axel Scheffler; Julia Smuts Louw
- Based on: The Smeds and the Smoos by Julia Donaldson
- Produced by: Barney Goodland; Martin Pope; Simon Quinn; Michael Rose
- Starring: Sally Hawkins; Ashna Rabheru; Daniel Ezra; Adjoa Andoh; Bill Bailey
- Edited by: Robin Sales
- Music by: René Aubry
- Production companies: Magic Light Pictures; BBC One; BBC iPlayer; ZDF Studios
- Distributed by: Les Films du Préau
- Release dates: 25 December 2022 (United Kingdom); 18 October 2023 (France)
- Running time: 26 minutes
- Country: United Kingdom

The Smeds and The Smoos is a 2022 British animated short film directed by Samantha Cutler and Daniel Snaddon. The film is the screen adaptation produced by Magic Light Pictures of the homonymous children's book written by Julia Donaldson and illustrated by Axel Scheffler. The story follows two warring clans of aliens on their journey from prejudice and intolerance to kindness and friendship.

== Plot ==
Bill and Janet, two aliens from warring clans, have been taught to despise their neighbours. When they fall in love and run away together, their families are forced to come together and set their differences aside in order to find them and bring them home. Along their journey across the galaxy searching of Bill and Janet, the Smeds and the Smoos will unexpectedly become friends.

== Cast ==
- Sally Hawkins as the Narrator
- Ashna Rabheru as Janet
- Daniel Ezra as Bill
- Adjoa Andoh as Grandmother Smoo
- Bill Bailey as Grandfather Smed
- Rob Brydon as Uncle Smoo
- Meera Syal as Aunt Smed

== Production ==
The Smeds and The Smoos was produced by the studio Magic Light Pictures. According to producer Barney Goodland, the production began in early 2021 and involved 140 people over the course of two years.

The film was animated with the 3D animation program Autodesk Maya and rendered using the Redishift rendering software. The characters in the film, as well as the backgrounds and the overall design of the world, are inspired by the original book illustrations by Alex Scheffler.

== Release ==
The film was first released on 25 December 2022 on BBC One as a Christmas special.

== Reception ==
=== Accolades ===
The film received several official selections in film festivals around the world, including:

Year	Festivals	Award/Category	Status
2022	Shanghai International TV Festival	Magnolia Award for Best Animation	Nominated
2022	Shanghai International TV Festival	Magnolia Award for Best Storytelling (Animation)	Nominated
2023	NYC International Children's Film Festival	Audience Award (Ages 3–6)	Won
2023	Cleveland International Film Festival	Best Animation	Nominated
