= Robin Sales =

British film editor

- Occupation: Film editor
- Years active: 1975–present

Robin Sales is a British film editor with more than 50 credits.

== Filmography ==
=== Editing ===
Year	Title	Notes
1975	Three Men in a Boat	TV film
1977	The Risk Business	Episode: "Everything to Play For"
1977	The Road to Kathmandu	Documentary
1979	Secret Army	12 episodes
1980	Breakaway	6 episodes
1980	Premiere	Episode: "Rabbit Pie Day"
1980	Shoestring	Episode: "Looking for Mr Wright"
1981	Kessler	3 episodes
1980–1982	BBC2 Playhouse	3 episodes
1982	Play for Today	Episode: "Home Sweet Home"
1982	Arena	Episode: "Mike Leigh Making Plays"
1983	The Captain's Doll	TV film
1984	Four Days in July	TV film
1985	Silas Marner	TV film
1986	Shoot for the Sun	TV films
1986–1989	Screen Two	4 episodes
1988	Coppers	TV film
1989	The Jim Henson Hour	Episode: "Monster Maker"
1989	Windprints	
1990	The Gravy Train	4 episodes
1991	A Woman at War	TV film
1993	A Year in Provence	2 episodes
1993–1995	Sharpe	6 episodes
1996	Swann	
1997	Career Girls	
1997	Mrs Brown	
1997	The Woman in White	TV film
1998	Immortality	
1999	Topsy-Turvy	
2001	Bye Bye Baby	TV film
2001	Very Annie Mary	Also second unit director
2001	The Martins	
2003	Johnny English	
2004	Secret Passage	
2005	On a Clear Day	
2005	Keeping Mum	Also second unit director
2006	Miss Potter	
2008	Last Chance Harvey	
2009	The Gruffalo	TV film
2011	Chalet Girl	
2011	The Gruffalo's Child	TV film
2012	Room on the Broom	TV film
2013	Playhouse Presents	Episode: "The Call Out"
2014	French Cricket	Short film; editing advisor
2014	Walking on Sunshine	
2015	Stick Man	TV film
2016	Narrated By	Short film
2016	ChickLit	
2016	Acres and Acres	
2017	Hampstead	
2017	Base	TV film; additional editor
2017	The Highway Rat	TV film
2018	Zog	TV film
2018	Two Way War American Spy League	
2020	Zog and the Flying Doctors	TV film
2021	Superworm	TV film
2022	The Smeds and the Smoos	TV film
