= Revolting Rhymes (film) =

2016 British animated television film

- Based on: Revolting Rhymes by: Roald Dahl; Quentin Blake
- Screenplay by: Jakob Schuh; Jan Lachauer
- Directed by: Jakob Schuh; Jan Lachauer
- Starring: Rob Brydon; Bertie Carvel; Gemma Chan; Tamsin Grieg; Isaac Hempstead Wright; Rose Leslie; Bel Powley; David Walliams; Dominic West
- Composer: Ben Locket
- Country of origin: United Kingdom
- Original language: English
- No. of episodes: 2

Production
- Executive producers: Elizabeth Kilgarriff; Dominic Gregory
- Producers: Martin Pope; Michael Rose
- Editor: Benjamin Quabeck
- Running time: 56 minutes
- Production companies: Magic Light Pictures; The Roald Dahl Story Company

Original release
- Network: BBC One
- Release: 26 December – 27 December 2016

Revolting Rhymes is a 2016 British animated fantasy comedy drama television film written for the screen and directed by Jakob Schuh and Jan Lachauer, based on the 1982 book written by Roald Dahl and illustrated by Quentin Blake.

Retelling and intertwining five of the six fairy tales from the book, the two-part film was produced by Magic Light Pictures. The film was animated in Berlin (Magic Light Pictures Berlin) and Cape Town (Triggerfish Animation Studios). It aired on BBC One in the United Kingdom and on PBS in the United States.

One of the parts was nominated for the Academy Award for Best Animated Short Film at the 90th Academy Awards.

== Plot ==
=== Part 1 ===
An elderly woman named Miss Hunt is sitting by herself in a booth at an empty restaurant when a wolf in a trenchcoat enters and requests sitting with her. Miss Hunt allows the wolf and learns he is waiting for an old friend, revealing that she is waiting to babysit the children in the house across the street. Upon noticing Miss Hunt's book of fairy tales, the wolf expresses disdain for Red Riding Hood and states that Snow White is actually a blonde. He then reveals that he once had two nephews, Rolf and Rex, and begins to tell the story of what happened to them.

Some years earlier, a young Red Riding Hood was selling flowers on the street and sold a sprig of mistletoe to a young princess named Snow White, who dropped it into the grave of her recently deceased mother. Red soon joins Snow White by dropping her own remaining flowers in the grave and comforting Snow, the two quickly become friends. Snow's father, the king, soon finds a new queen, the nasty Miss Maclahose. She brings with her to the castle a magic mirror that always gives an accurate answer to any question asked of it, the mirror constantly telling Maclahose that she is the fairest in the land until Snow grows up and the mirror declares her the fairest. Outraged, Maclahose orders the Huntsman to kill Snow and bring back her heart.

Meanwhile, the adult Red now runs her own flower stall and keeps her savings in a piggy bank at Porkley's Bank. Red and Snow were enjoying themselves in the forest when the Huntsman appears and kidnaps Snow, dropping his pistol which Red picked up while failing to save Snow. At the same time, Rolf has a falling out with his uncle and his search for a meal results in him eating Red's grandmother before putting on her clothes to eat Red, who, however, is not disturbed, briefly confusing him before shooting him dead with the pistol – yielding herself a new wolfskin coat which she points out to the wolf while mourning Snow in the forest.

Snow manages to convince the Huntsman to spare her life, fleeing while he buys a cow heart at a butcher shop and present it to Maclahose, who eagerly devours it. Snow ends up in the city where she becomes a cook and maid for seven former jockeys, who are compulsive and unsuccessful gamblers at horse racing. Meanwhile, Red attempts to withdraw her savings from Porkley's Bank. The pig in charge of the bank lies that the bank is broke due to a bad economy, having embezzled the investments (including Red's own savings) in a construction project run by two other pigs, who planned to build houses of straw and sticks, but their venture failed to even start when Rex appeared and devoured the two pigs.

Rex makes his way to Porkley's Bank, intending to eat the banker pig, but the banker pig secures himself behind his thick teller window, while the wolf resolves to come back to blow up the bank with dynamite. The banker pig calls Red after seeing a newspaper article about her killing Rolf, with Red killing Rex as he lights the fuse. The banker pig takes Red into a hidden back room to thank her with a romantic gesture, only to be shot dead when Red not only finds out the bank actually has plenty of money but also discovers the truth of what happened to her own savings.

Meanwhile, Snow resolves to help the jockeys by sneaking back into her father's castle and taking the magic mirror so they can use it to correctly predict the winning horse. When the mirror declares the winning horse of an upcoming race to be Mistletoe, it saddens Snow from remembering Red's mistletoe, only to cheer up upon the mirror showing her Red on a bus en route to the city. Snow meets her at the bus station and the two friends happily reunite, Red offering the money that she withdrew from the bank and kept in a pigskin travelling case she made from the banker pig. As everyone watches the race, Red gives Snow a fur coat made from Rex's skin as they and the jockeys became millionaires from their venture.

As the story ends, it is revealed that wolf has tied up and gagged Miss Hunt in a closet after putting on her clothes to get his revenge on Red for killing his nephews. Snow arrives at the house across the street to meet Red, who lives there with her two children. Despite concerns that their babysitter has not come, Red's daughter persuades her mother to leave her and her brother alone until Miss Hunt arrives. Red and Snow leave together with the wolf proceeding to the house in the guise of Miss Hunt.

=== Part 2 ===
Red's children instantly see through the wolf's disguise; the daughter is shocked by his appearance while her brother is entertained by the wolf's jovial air. The wolf takes the boy into the kitchen and starts cooking a pot of vegetables, menacingly yet playfully stating his intent to eat the boy. The girl deters him by announcing that it is story time; the wolf begrudgingly sets a timer and follows the children into the living room. The girl tells the wolf that he must read two stories, one for each child. The boy asks to hear Jack and the Beanstalk, but the wolf states that he cannot tell the story without also talking about Cinderella, a favorite story of Red's daughter. The wolf claims that the stories they know are toned-down versions of the same "true" story, which he proceeds to tell.

Jack lives in a ramshackle house with his abusive mother and harbours a crush on his next door neighbour Cinderella, who is abused by her wicked stepsisters. One morning, Cindy sneaks a jar of jam for herself. Jack attempts to warn her when the short stepsister notices the missing jar. While Cindy dismisses him and ends up being thrown in the basement by her stepsisters, Jack is berated by his mother and told to take their old cow into town to sell it. Jack comes across a magic shop and ends up trading the cow to its owner, a magic fairy, for a bean. His mother berates him upon his return and throws the bean into a rubbish pile before beating him with her vacuum's handle.

Meanwhile, after her stepsisters leave for a disco held at the castle, Cindy's cries for help attract the fairy and she reluctantly enters the house. Cindy asks her for a beautiful set of clothes and a coach so that she may attend the disco and win the prince's affection. The fairy grants her wish, but warns her that she must leave the palace by midnight. Cindy instantly catches the eye of everyone at the disco, including the prince, with whom she shares a dance as her jealous stepsisters look on. As the clock strikes midnight, Cindy attempts to flee, but the prince tries to stop her, tearing off her dress in the process. A humiliated Cindy runs off in her underwear, losing one of her silver shoes on the palace stairs. The prince declares that whoever the shoe fits will become his bride, but he carelessly leaves the shoe on a beer keg, allowing the short stepsister to replace it with one of her own smelly shoes.

The next morning, Jack discovers that the bean has sprouted into an enormous beanstalk during the night. His mother is unimpressed by this sight until Jack points out that the beanstalk's leaves are made of solid gold. Jack's mother sends him up to fetch them, but he quickly descends when he finds a menacing giant at the top who threatens to eat him upon smelling him. Jack's mother decides to ascend herself after berating Jack for not bathing enough, only to be eaten herself. Undeterred, Jack decides to bathe, and then climbs up and collects the leaves after seeing the giant unable to detect him.

In town, the prince lays out the short stepsister's shoe for different women to try on, but the shoe is too big to fit anyone. When the short stepsister tries it on, the prince is horrified to see that it fits her and attempts to get out of marrying her. The short stepsister, however, reminds him of the vow he had made and the prince chops off her head in response. When the prince removes the head of the tall stepsister, a heartbroken Cindy expresses disgust at the prince's penchant for chopping off heads for fun, but the prince, who does not recognize her, orders her head chopped off too and chases her down with his guards to a dead end.

By this time, Red's son has fallen asleep while the wide-eyed daughter asks the wolf about Cindy's fate. He prepares to give her a sad ending, but the magic fairy soon appears to help Cindy, who tells her that she is no longer interested in princes and money, but simply wishes to find a decent man. The fairy turns the prince and his guards into frogs and leaves Cindy in front of her old magic shop, which Jack bought and made into a jam shop, having named it after her. The two later marry and have two children, living happily ever after.

With both children now asleep, the wolf has a change of heart and decides not to exact revenge. Red returns home from her outing to find her sleeping children on the couch, along with Miss Hunt's book of fairy tales. She is then shocked to discover the wolf, who she recognizes from their earlier encounter, but the wolf simply wishes her good night and departs. Red sits at her kitchen table in disbelief, eating the stew the wolf had prepared; while the wolf exits a bus in the wilderness, sheds Miss Hunt's clothes, and returns to the woods having let the past go.

== Cast ==
- Dominic West as the Wolf / the Magic Fairy / the Giant
- Rob Brydon as the King / Rolf / the Banker Pig / the Short Sister
- Bertie Carvel as the Mirror / the Huntsman / the Senior Dwarf / the Prince
- David Walliams as Rex / the Straw and Twig Pigs / Bystander / the Tall Sister / Jack's Mother
- Tamsin Greig as Miss Hunt / Miss Maclahose / Grandma
- Rose Leslie as Red Riding Hood
  - Dolly Heavey as Young Red Riding Hood
- Gemma Chan as Snow White
  - Eden Muckle as Young Snow White
- Isaac Hempstead Wright as Jack
- Bel Powley as Cinderella
- Dylan Issberner as Red Riding Hood's son
- Amelie Forester-Evans as Red Riding Hood's daughter

== Reception ==
=== Critical reception ===
On review aggregator website Rotten Tomatoes, the film has an approval rating of 85% based on 14 reviews, and an average rating of 7.5/10.

=== Awards ===
Year	Presenter/Festival	Award/Category	Status
2018	Academy Awards	Best Animated Short Film	Nominated
2018	British Academy Children's Awards	Best Animation	Won

== Home media ==
In the United Kingdom, Revolting Rhymes was released on DVD by Entertainment One and 20th Century Fox Home Entertainment on 6 February 2017. In the United States, Revolting Rhymes was originally going to be distributed by GKIDS, but was released on DVD by PBS Distribution on 15 August 2017.
