= Sparkle (2007 film) =

- Theatrical release poster
- Directed by: Tom Hunsinger; Neil Hunter
- Written by: Tom Hunsinger; Neil Hunter
- Produced by: Martin Pope; Michael Rose
- Starring: Stockard Channing; Shaun Evans; Anthony Head; Bob Hoskins
- Cinematography: Sean Van Hales
- Edited by: Martin Brinkler
- Music by: Adrian Johnston
- Production companies: BBC Films; UK Film Council; Magic Light Pictures; North West Film; Isle of Man Film Commission; Baker Street Film Partners
- Distributed by: Vertigo Films
- Release dates: 9 February 2007 (European Film Market); 17 August 2007
- Running time: 104 minutes
- Country: United Kingdom
- Language: English

Sparkle is a 2007 British comedy film written and directed by Tom Hunsinger and Neil Hunter, and was shot on location in London, Liverpool and the Isle of Man.

== Plot ==
Sam Sparkes is a 22-year-old with ambitions: move to London and join the glamorous PR world. When Vince hires Sam as a waiter, he meets his soon-to-be PR boss, Sheila. Sensing opportunity, Sam charms himself a job as Sheila's PA ... and her lover. But when Sam falls for Kate, he instigates a series of family betrayals and romantic mishaps. As balancing his job and love life becomes overwhelming, unexpected twists and uncovered secrets force Sam to choose between his career and the woman of his dreams.

== Cast ==
- Stockard Channing as Sheila
- Shaun Evans as Sam Sparkes
- Anthony Head as Tony
- Bob Hoskins as Vince
- Lesley Manville as Jill Sparkes
- Amanda Ryan as Kate
- John Shrapnel as Bernie
- Peter Gordon as Ivor
- Roy Carruthers as Frank
- Sophia Dawnay as Camilla
- Ellie Haddington as Frances
- David Woodcock as Simon
- Richard Cant as Adrian
- Omar Berdouni as Luis

== Reception ==
On the review aggregator website Rotten Tomatoes, 78% of 18 critics' reviews are positive, with an average rating of 5.9/10.
