= One Life (2011 film) =

- Film poster
- Directed by: Michael Gunton; Martha Holmes
- Written by: Michael Gunton; Martha Holmes
- Produced by: Martin Pope, Michael Rose
- Narrated by: Daniel Craig
- Music by: George Fenton
- Production companies: IM Global; BBC Earth Films; Magic Light Pictures
- Distributed by: Kaleidoscope Entertainment
- Release date: 22 July 2011
- Running time: 85 minutes
- Country: United Kingdom
- Language: English
- Box office: $16.5 million (original release) $4,045 (2014 re-release)

One Life is a 2011 British nature documentary film directed by Michael Gunton and Martha Holmes. The film is narrated by the British actor Daniel Craig.

== Release ==
One Life premiered on 22 July 2011 in the United Kingdom. The film had a limited release in the United States in February 2013.

=== Reception ===
On review aggregator Rotten Tomatoes, the film holds an approval rating of 90% based on 21 reviews, with an average rating of 6.85/10. On Metacritic, the film has a weighted average score of 68 out of 100, based on 9 critics, indicating "generally favorable reviews".

For his narration, Craig was nominated for the Primetime Emmy Award for Outstanding Narrator.
