= The Gruffalo's Child (film) =

2011 film

- Film poster
- Created by: Max Lang
- Based on: The Gruffalo's Child by Julia Donaldson
- Written by: Julia Donaldson; Axel Scheffler
- Directed by: Johannes Weiland; Uwe Heidschotter
- Voices of: Helena Bonham Carter; Rob Brydon; Robbie Coltrane; James Corden; Shirley Henderson; John Hurt; Tom Wilkinson
- Narrated by: Helena Bonham Carter
- Theme music composer: René Aubry
- Countries of origin: United Kingdom; Germany
- Original language: English

Production
- Producers: Martin Pope; Michael Rose
- Editor: Robin Sales
- Running time: 30 minutes
- Production companies: Magic Light Pictures Orange Eyes; Studio Soi

Original release
- Network: BBC One (United Kingdom); ZDF (Germany)
- Release: 25 December 2011

The Gruffalo's Child is a 2011 animated fantasy short television film based on the 2004 picture book of the same name written by Julia Donaldson and illustrated by Axel Scheffler. A sequel to The Gruffalo, the film was shown on Christmas Day 2011 in the United Kingdom, exactly two years after the debut of the first film.

Directed by Johannes Weiland and Uwe Heidschotter, the film was produced by Michael Rose and Martin Pope of Magic Light Pictures, London, in association with Studio Soi in Ludwigsburg, Germany, alongside its broadcasters and commissioners; the BBC and ZDF. In June 2013, the film was given the Award for Best TV Special at the 8th Festival of European Animated Feature Films and TV Specials. It was nominated for the British Academy Children's Award for Animation in 2012.

== Plot ==
In a snowy wood, the daughter squirrel shows her brother footprints in the snow, telling him that they are the Gruffalo's. The son squirrel tells their mother. However, the Mother Squirrel says that the footprints are too small to be a Gruffalo and tells her children the story of the Gruffalo's child.

The story begins with the Gruffalo's daughter attempting to follow a hedgehog into the deep dark wood. Her father, The Gruffalo however forbids it, warning her of the "Big Bad Mouse". He tells her about the time he met the mouse, but he cannot remember what he looks like and describes him as a strong monster, with a scaly tail, fiery eyes, and whiskers "tougher than wire", and his daughter imagines the mouse to be just as her father depicts him.

That night, however, the Gruffalo's daughter decides to explore the deep dark wood and find the Big Bad Mouse. On her journey, she follows footprints and meets the animals from the previous story. The first one is Snake, who tells her that she can find the mouse down by the lake, and later tries to drown her, but ultimately fails and returns to his house. Next, Owl tells the Gruffalo's Child that the mouse is "somewhere nearby" and eating "Gruffalo pie" he then flies away. The Gruffalo's Child then follows a set of footprints until she finds an underground house. She falls in and awakes the creature inside it, Fox, who realizes that she is the same species as her father, and retreats to his home in panic. She finally decides that the monster does not exist and that the animals and her father tricked her. She notices the mouse (from the first film) leaving his house and when she threatens to eat him, he tells her to let him show her the monster is real, and makes a large shadow in the moonlight on the branch of a hazel tree. The Gruffalo's Child believes the shadow to be the Big Bad Mouse and runs out of the forest in fear, with the mouse following her. In the Gruffalo cave, she is now comfortable at her father's side and the mouse watches over them.

When the Mother Squirrel finishes the story, her daughter reveals that she made the Gruffalo footprints to prank her brother and they go to play.

== Voice cast ==
- Helena Bonham Carter as Mother Squirrel/Narrator
- Rob Brydon as Snake
- Robbie Coltrane as Gruffalo
- James Corden as Mouse
- Shirley Henderson as Gruffalo's Child
- John Hurt as Owl
- Tom Wilkinson as Fox
- Sam Lewis as Boy Squirrel
- Phoebe Givron-Taylor as Girl Squirrel

== Reception ==
A review by Pete Dillon-Trenchard in Den of Geek states, "In short, if you enjoyed the first Gruffalo film, you'll love this one too. It's a warm, witty, heart-filled piece of family entertainment that, once again, looks absolutely gorgeous." According to a review by Common Sense Media, "The Gruffalo's Child spans the age divide to entertain families, but if your little one is a sensitive sort, you may want to preview the movie to sus out the impact of some of the more perilous moments before you tune in together."

== Sequel ==
The sequel to The Gruffalo's Child, based on Gruffalo Granny, is in development.
