= Chico and Rita =

- British theatrical release poster
- Directed by: Fernando Trueba; Javier Mariscal; Tono Errando
- Written by: Fernando Trueba; Ignacio Martínez de Pisón
- Produced by: Santi Errando; Cristina Huete; Michael Rose; Martin Pope
- Starring: Limara Meneses; Eman Xor Oña; Mario Guerra; Jon Adams; Renny Arozarena
- Edited by: Arnau Quiles
- Music by: Bebo Valdés
- Production companies: Fernando Trueba PC; Estudio Mariscal; Magic Light Pictures
- Distributed by: Buena Vista International (Spain); CinemaNX (United Kingdom); Rézo Films (France)
- Release dates: 19 November 2010 (United Kingdom); 25 February 2011 (Spain)
- Running time: 94 minutes
- Countries: Spain; Isle of Man; Hungary; Philippines
- Languages: Spanish; English; French
- Budget: €10 million
- Box office: $2.2 million

Chico and Rita (Spanish: Chico y Rita) is a 2010 adult animated romantic drama film directed by Tono Errando, Fernando Trueba and Javier Mariscal. The story of Chico and Rita is set against backdrops of Havana, New York City, Las Vegas, Los Angeles and Paris in the late 1940s and early 1950s. Chico is a young piano player with big dreams. Rita is a beautiful singer with an extraordinary voice. Music and romantic desire unite them, but their journey—in the tradition of the Latin ballad, the bolero—brings heartache and torment. The film was produced by Fernando Trueba Producciones, Estudio Mariscal, and Magic Light Pictures. It received financing from CinemaNX and Isle of Man Film. It won the Goya Award for Best Animated Film at the 25th Goya Awards and was nominated for Best Animated Feature at the 84th Academy Awards (the first nomination for a Spanish full-length animated film).

== Plot ==
In 1948 Havana, Chico and his best friend Ramón are struggling dandies in a low-life bar during the Batista regime. During what's meant to be a date with American tourists, they both go to a bar where Chico falls in love with the band's lead singer, Rita. Chico and Ramón then go to the Tropicana Club, which happens to have a missing pianist for a performance Rita will be involved in. Chico takes the offer and has a successful performance with the band. Both Rita and Chico then go on their own date which involves a dangerous motorcycle and Chico playing bebop music to Rita at another empty bar, and having sex at Chico's place. The next day, Juana, Chico's former girlfriend, walks in and picks a fight with Rita. The two women angrily leave Chico, feeling betrayed. However, Chico is still smitten with Rita and begs Ramon to convince her to perform with him for an upcoming radio contest. Ramon pays Rita to sing with Chico but after the contest, Rita leaves Chico without speaking to him. He follows her to the house of a santera, who predicts that Chico will cause her much suffering. The two win the contest and awarded a month's engagement at the Hotel Nacional.

A few weeks later, Chico and Rita are having great success in their performances. One businessperson, Ron, notices Rita and offers to take Rita to New York City, a burgeoning place for jazz and Latin music. However, Rita insists that the offer must include Chico. However, Chico gets a false impression Rita is leaving him for Ron, and has a date with Juana. Hurt, Rita agrees to go to New York with Ron, alone. Chico and Ramon also go to New York to seek their fortunes. Chico finds work as a party musician, and Ramón as an usher at the Plaza Hotel. At one of his party gigs, Chico runs into a successful Rita again, and the two run away in her new car and spend the night together again. The next day, Ron locates Ramón and proposes a deal to finance his artist-agency business, as long as Ramon finds jobs to keep Chico away from Rita. Ramón complies with his end of the bargain and signs Chico with Dizzy Gillespie, who gives him a gig in Paris and a European tour. Rita becomes a big film star while Chico finds a new girlfriend in Paris. Back in New York, despite her wealth and success, Rita is mistreated socially due to her skin color.

While being driven to a set, the radio plays a new Jazz hit that she instantly recognizes as "Rita", the piece Chico composed for her while they dated in Cuba. Rita then notices Chico playing the song at a bar under a different name, "Lily", which is the name of Chico's French girlfriend's dog. After the performance, the two passionately kiss and make up. Chico and Rita agree to marry that New Year's Eve, after Rita's debut in Las Vegas. However, it never happens. Ramón, by slipping drugs into Chico's coat, gets him arrested and sent back to Cuba at the start of Castro's regime; and Rita ruins her career by publicly denouncing racism of the film industry and the hypocrisy of being a celebrated black artist. Forty-seven years later, Chico is a shoe-shiner in Havana, Ramón is dead, and Ron is in a nursing home in New York. Chico gets asked for his jazz compositions by a famous young singer and her entourage. After performing and recording his music with them, he becomes world-famous for the second time. Chico is then allowed re-entry into the United States, and reunites with Rita at the same Las Vegas motel she's been a housekeeper at for her 47 years in the city.

== Cast ==
- Limara Meneses as Rita
- Eman Xor Oña as Chico
- Mario Guerra as Ramón
- Jon Adams
- Renny Arozarena
- Blanca Rosa Blanco
- Jackie de la Nuez
- Rigoberto Ferrera
- Ken Forman
- Ray Gillon
- Steve Harper
- Lenny Mandel as Roy
- Jorge Ryan
- Claudia Valdés
- Ashley Albert
- Tracey Ayer
- Carlos Cabal
- Wendy Dillon
- Kathy Fitzgerald
- Luis Alberto García
- Mark Anthony Henry
- Kerin McCue
- Miriam Socarras
- Peter Appel
- Jay Benedict
- Luis Enrique Carreres
- Aleida Enríquez
- Carlos Ever Fonseca
- Eddy Calderón
- Alexis González
- David Kramer
- Estrella Morente
- Diana Preisler
- Isabelle Stoffel
- Gladys Zurbano

== Collaborators ==
Director Fernando Trueba met designer and artist Javier Mariscal ten years earlier when he asked him to create a poster for his Latin jazz documentary Calle 54. So began a collaboration that saw Mariscal design all the artwork for Trueba's Calle 54 Records, make animated pop promos for the label, and together create a jazz-music restaurant in Madrid. Chico & Rita would be Javier Mariscal's first animated feature film as designer. The idea to make an animated feature film emerged from one of those pop promos, La Negra Tomasa by Cuban musician Compay Segundo. Mariscal's younger brother Tono Errando, with a background in music, film and animation, leads the audio-visual side of the multi-disciplinary creative company, and was chosen to collaborate with Trueba and Mariscal. From the beginning, all three men were excited by the idea of making a film set against the Havana music scene in the late-40s and 50s. "That age is beautiful in design and architecture, so visually it belongs very much to Mariscal's world," says Errando. "And in music it's a moment that's fantastic: it's the moment where Cuban musicians go to New York and join the Anglo Saxon jazz musicians. This fusion changed the music at that time."

== Production ==
Before drawing the locations in Cuba, Mariscal completed an intense research trip. Although many of Havana's pre-revolutionary buildings had decayed, either deliberately or from neglect, the filmmakers discovered that the Havana city government had assembled an archive of photographs to help with street repairs. Pictures of every street corner in Havana since 1949 were archived, conveying the look and mood of the era. The team also found pictures taken inside the planes ferrying Americans to the party island. Mariscal explained that the planes arriving from New York, Washington, D.C., and Miami during that period were filled with Cuban musicians entertaining the passengers. They provided much historical information about the Cubans of that era: the clothes, the faces, the streets, billboards, cars, bars, the way they lived, and the sensational life of Havana.

Principal production took place entirely on the Isle of Man.

== Release ==
Walt Disney Studios Motion Pictures distributed the film in 100 Spanish theaters on 25 February 2010. GKIDS holds the distribution rights for the film in North America. The film has also been shown at the following festivals and released in the UK and Spain. The English dub will include the voices of Wendell Pierce, Mary J. Blige, Rob Riggle, Chris Pine, and Viola Davis.

=== Film festivals ===
- Bradford Animation Festival (UK) on 9 November 2010
- Telluride Film Festival on 4 September 2010
- Toronto International Film Festival in September 2010
- London Spanish Film festival on 6 October 2010
- London Latin American Film Festival in November 2010
- Holland Animation Film Festival in November 2010
- Cape Town Design/FilmFest at Design Indaba February 2011
- Miami International Film Festival March 2011
- TYPO Berlin 2011 Design Conference on 19 May
- Trinidad and Tobago Film Festival (opening gala show) in September 2011
- Sonoma County Cuban Film Festival, Sebastopol, CA in July 2015

== Reception ==
On review aggregator website Rotten Tomatoes, the film holds an approval rating of 88% based on 72 reviews, with an average rating of 7.6/10. It also has a score of 76 out of 100 on Metacritic, based on 27 critics, indicating "generally favorable reviews".

Roger Ebert of the Chicago Sun-Times gave the film three and a half stars out of four, while the BBC's Mark Kermode listed the film fifth in his top five films of 2010. Philip French called the film "the year's best musical and one of the year's finest animated films" and an "utterly delightful, ...affecting, funny, historically accurate and at times pleasingly erotic story", while Sounds and Colors called the film "a crowning achievement; a mixture of great animation, music and history with a narrative that reads like the simple story of heartbreak that bestows the greatest of love songs." In March 2011, The Miami Herald said "the film melds dazzling visuals and a wildly infectious score into a simple yet affecting love story" and while the "first 30 minutes of Chico & Rita achieve a giddy high the rest of the movie can never match", "Chico & Rita makes you fall hard for music, as hard as the protagonists fall for each other, and the movie is decent enough to give its lovebirds the tender finale they deserve." Fotogramas, the oldest and most prestigious film magazine in Spain, gave the film 4 out of 5 stars and praised how its characters were "more human and alive than many real actors", unlike Variety, which negatively reviewed the film, calling it, "...a test, one that gauges whether your love of Cuban jazz can exceed your threshold for lousy animation... [in] an unflattering style, like a children's coloring book with its rudimentary line drawings and stiff, expressionless characters." The film was "...evocative enough of late-'40s Havana and the sweaty, sensual music of the time."

=== Accolades ===
Award	Date of ceremony	Category	Recipient(s)	Result
Academy Awards	26 February 2012	Best Animated Feature	Fernando Trueba; Javier Mariscal	Nominated
Annie Awards	4 February 2012	Best Animated Feature		Nominated
European Film Awards	3 December 2011	Best Animated Feature Film	Tono Errando; Fernando Trueba; Javier Mariscal	Won
Festival of European Animated Feature Films and TV Specials	19 June 2011	Hungarian National Student Jury Award	Fernando Trueba; Javier Mariscal; Tono Errando	Won
Goya Awards	13 February 2011	Best Animated Film	Fernando Trueba; Javier Mariscal	Won

== Music ==
The film has an original soundtrack by Cuban pianist, bandleader and composer Bebo Valdés. It features music by Thelonious Monk, Cole Porter, Dizzy Gillespie and Freddy Cole. According to Tono Errando, "it was the moment when new musicians came along like Charlie Parker and Dizzy Gillespie with a new kind of music, that is not for dancing, full of notes, played really fast, a music that now we call jazz. Then the Cuban musicians arrived. Dizzy Gillespie has said many times in interviews, there was a moment for him that was very important, it was the moment he first played with Chano Pozo. Pozo was the first percussionist that played in a jazz band." Cuban pianist, bandleader, composer and arranger of the film Bebo Valdés was living in obscurity in Stockholm, when Trueba reintroduced his playing to an international audience with his film Calle 54, and went on to produce the Grammy-winning Lagrimas Negras album, teaming Valdes with flamenco singer Diego 'el Cigala'. Trueba was also able to persuade the real-life flamenco star Estrella Morente, who has been performing since the age of seven, to participate in the film. Musicians featured in the film include Chucho Valdés, Dizzy Gillespie, Charlie Parker, Chano Pozo, Tito Puente, Ben Webster, and Thelonious Monk.

== See also ==
- Buena Vista Social Club
