= Triggerfish Animation Studios =

South African animation studio

- Industry: CGI animation; Motion pictures
- Founded: 1996; 30 years ago
- Headquarters: Cape Town, South Africa
- Key people: Stuart Forrest (CEO); Anthony Silverston (Writer & Director); James Middleton (Producer); Jean-Michel Koenig (CFO); Mike Buckland (Animation Producer); Vanessa Sinden (Producer)
- Website: triggerfish.com

Triggerfish is a computer animation film studio based in Cape Town, South Africa, Bristol, UK and Galway, Ireland. The company consists of a premium global service division, and an Originals division—which holds a mission of making a difference through the production of African-based animation that is grounded in self-awareness and African identity.

The studio is best known for its animated feature films Adventures in Zambezia (2012), Khumba (2013), and Seal Team (2021), as well as the work they have done on television specials created for UK producers Magic Light Pictures.

== History ==
Triggerfish was established in 1996 by Jacquie Trowell and Emma Kaye in Cape Town, South Africa. As a stop-motion animation studio, it produced multiple commercials for South African ad agencies. From 1998 through 2008, Triggerfish produced animation for Sesame Workshop for the South African version of Sesame Street, Takalani Sesame, as well as the US domestic and international versions of the pre-school kids' program.

Stuart Forrest joined as a junior animator in 2002 to work on Takalani Sesame for seasons two and three. In 2004, Forrest and James Middleton became partners in Triggerfish and in 2005 became the sole partners when the original founders left the company. In 2007, Anthony Silverston joined as creative director, and Mike Buckland joined as head of production. At the same time, the company moved away from stop-frame animation and relaunched as a computer animation studio. This was also the beginning of there CG commissions for American Production companies.

In 2015, at the Premier's Entrepreneurship Recognition Awards (PERA), Triggerfish was named Business of the Year by the Western Cape Government.

In 2021, Triggerfish received the Mifa Animation Industry Award at Annecy for "the pioneering role that the company has played in animation in South Africa, and Africa most widely.”

=== Short films ===
In 2008, Triggerfish created a 30-minute short entitled The Rise and Fall of Tony the Frog. The short was produced by Ambient Animation in Cape Town for Isaac Entertainment.

In 2018, Triggerfish released an original 4-minute short entitled Belly Flop, co-directed by Jeremy Collins and writer Kelly Dillon. This was one of four shorts screened during the closing ceremony at Annecy 2018. A second original short film,Troll Girl premiered at the Cape Town International Animation Festival in 2021.

Triggerfish was one of nine studios selected around the world to produce a short for Volume 2 of the Star Wars Visions anthology. The short, entitled "Aau's Song", was released on 4 May 2023.

=== Feature films ===
From 2006, the team began to shift focus to motion pictures by writing their first script Adventures in Zambezia, with US-based rights company Wonderful Works. The script went into production in 2009 and was released in 2012. In 2010, the studio started production on Khumba which started its worldwide release in Q3 2013. Triggerfish's third feature, called Seal Team., premiered on Netflix on 31 December 2021. In 2022, Seal Team made the Netflix Top 10 Films global list for its launch week.

=== Television animated series ===
On April 16, 2019, it was announced that Netflix had given a series order for the animated superhero series Mama K's Team 4. The series is expected to be produced by the studio in collaboration with CAKE. Malenga Mulendema will be credited as an executive producer and writer of the series.

In February 2021, it was announced that eOne (now known as Lionsgate Canada) had green-lit the animated superhero series Kiya & the Kimoja Heroes, about a seven-year-old African girl whose passions in life are dancing and martial arts with a superhero twist targeted towards a younger audience. The original idea for Kiya & the Kimoja Heroes was created by Kelly Dillon and Marc Dey, then developed for television by Robert Vargas. Kiya & the Kimoja Heroes launched in March 2023 across linear and streaming platforms including Disney Jr., Disney + globally, and France Télévisions.

In June 2021, it was announced that Disney+ had green-lit Triggerfish's animated anthology series Kizazi Moto: Generation Fire. Inspired by the continent's diverse histories and cultures, the 10-part anthology brings together a slate of rising animation talents from six African nations to produce action-packed sci-fi and fantasy stories that will present bold visions of advanced technology, aliens, spirits and monsters imagined from uniquely African perspectives. Oscar-winning co-director Peter Ramsey (known for his work on Spider-Man: Into the Spider-Verse) is as executive producer who worked on Kizazi Moto Generation Fire with Tendayi Nyeke and Anthony Silverston. Triggerfish is the lead studio for the anthology, working in collaboration with animation studios across the continent and globally. The development process was curated and produced by the team at Triggerfish, including Tendayi Nyeke, Anthony Silverston, and Kevin Kriedemann, who proposed the initial idea for the anthology.

The final 10 films are from Ahmed Teilab (Egypt), Simangaliso “Panda” Sibaya and Malcolm Wope (South Africa), Terence Maluleke and Isaac Mogajane (South Africa), Ng’endo Mukii (Kenya), Shofela Coker (Nigeria), Nthato Mokgata and Terence Neale (South Africa), Pious Nyenyewa and Tafadzwa Hove (Zimbabwe), Tshepo Moche (South Africa), Raymond Malinga (Uganda) and Lesego Vorster (South Africa).

Each film is 10-15 minutes long, and together comprises a feature-length anthology of original animation that will be released as a Disney Plus Original across the globe. The series will release on July 5, 2023.

=== Triggerfish Story Lab ===
In mid-2015, Triggerfish announced the Triggerfish Story Lab, a program that aimed to develop African writers and directors. The initiative had the support of the Walt Disney Company. Mama K's Team 4, the first Netflix Original animation series from Africa, was one of the projects unearthed by the Triggerfish Story Lab. A second TV series from the Triggerfish Story Lab, Kiya! (previously Ninja Princess). It was announced in February 2021 to have been picked up by Disney+.

=== Triggerfish Academy ===
In June 2019, Triggerfish launched a free online learning platform aimed at encouraging young creatives to create their first animated film. There sudden growth of Triggerfish allowed for the upstart of Triggerfish Academy. Where they wanted to face the and solve the problems of limited resources, educational tools and allow steady employment (which could be seen to discourage future animators and lead to them possibly leaving for better opportunity's elsewhere) in South African for South African animation industries and studios.

== Filmography ==
Feature films

#	Title	Release date	Notes	Budget	Gross	Rotten Tomatoes	Metacritic
1	Adventures in Zambezia	July 3, 2012		$20,000,000	$34,428,345	25%	N/A
2	Khumba	October 25, 2013		$20,000,000	$27,000,000	44%	40
3	Seal Team	December 31, 2021		$23,000,000	$905,428	68%	N/A

Short films and television films and specials

Title	Release date	Notes
Stick Man	December 25, 2015	For Magic Light Pictures;
Revolting Rhymes	December 26, 2016	For Magic Light Pictures;
The Highway Rat	December 25, 2017	For Magic Light Pictures;
Belly Flop	2018	Short;
Zog	December 25, 2018	For Magic Light Pictures;
The Snail and the Whale	December 25, 2019	Short; for Magic Light Pictures;
Troll Girl	2021	Short;
Star Wars: Visions: "Aau's Song"	May 4, 2023	Episode in animated anthology; for Lucasfilm

Television series

Title	Release date	Notes
Kiya & the Kimoja Heroes	2023-2024	For Disney Jr.;
Kizazi Moto: Generation Fire	2023	For Disney+;
Supa Team 4	2023	For Netflix;
Rosy Days †	TBA	Based on Belly Flop;
Tonko †	TBA	Together with TeamTO;
No. 1! †	TBA	

== Publishing ==
=== Graphic novels ===
- Pearl of the Sea, written by Anthony Silverston and Raffaella Delle Donne, illustrated by Willem Samuel (2023). Published by Catalyst Press
- Kariba, written and illustrated by Daniel and James Clarke (2023). Published by Catalyst Press

== Awards & Nominations ==
=== Adventures in Zambezia ===
- 2012 Best South African Feature Film at The Durban International Film Festival
- 2012 Best Animation at South African Film and Television Awards
- 2013 Best Animation at Africa Movie Academy Awards
- 2013 Best Children's Feature at Anima Mundi
- Nominated for Best Music in An Animated Feature (Bruce Retief) and Voice Acting In An Animated Feature (Jim Cummings) at the 2012 Annie Awards
- Nominated for Best Male Vocal Performance in An Animated Feature (Jim Cummings) at the 2013 Behind The Voice Actors Awards
- Nominated for Best Director (Wayne Thornley) & Best Original Score (Feature Film) at the 2013 South African Film and Television Awards

=== Khumba ===
Prior to its release, Khumba screened in competition at Annecy International Animation Festival 2013, where it was nominated for the Cristal, and was in the Official Selection of Durban International Film Festival and Toronto International Film Festival 2013.

- Gold Panda Award for Best Foreign Animation (2013)
- Gold Panda Award for Grand Prize (2013)
- 2014 Best Animation at South African Film and Television Awards
- 2014 Best Music Composition for a feature film at South African Film and Television Awards
- 2014 Best Animation at Africa Movie Academy Awards
- Nominated for Best Male Vocal Performance (Liam Neeson and Steve Buscemi), 2015 Behind The Voice Actor Awards

=== Belly Flop ===
- 2018 Gryphon Award for Best Short 6+ at Giffoni
- 2018 Best Animation, Africa Movie Academy Awards
- 2019 Audience Prize: Favorite Short Animated Film, Children's Film Festival Seattle
- 2018 Children's Jury Award at Cinemira in Budapest
- 2018 Best In Show and Best In 3D at Longwood Animation Film Festival
- 2018 Czech TV Audience Award at Zlin Film Festival
- 2018 Special Mention at Cinema In Sneakers Film Festival in Warsaw
- 2018 Best Local Film at Kleinkaap Short Film Festival
- 2018 Family Shorts Award at Tenerife International Short Film Festival
- 2018 Audience Award: Best Short Film at Animatopia ICAF
- 2019 Special Jury Award at CMS International Children's Film Festival
- 2019 2nd Place: Best Short Film at Kingstoon International Animated Film Competition
- 2019 Grand Prize: Short Film at Seoul Guro Kids Film Festival
- 2019 Audience Award for Best Short Animation at Festival Internacional de Cine para Niños
- 2019 Audience Award for Best Short Animation at Madrid Film Festival FCM-PNR

Production	Ceremony	Category	Recipient	Result
The Snail and the Whale	BAFTA Children and Young People Awards, 2022	Best Animation	Max Lang, Daniel Snaddon & Magic Light Pictures	Won
The Snail and the Whale	BAFTA Children and Young People Awards, 2022	Best Director	Max Lang, Daniel Snaddon & Magic Light Pictures	Won
The Snail and the Whale	Annie Awards, 2021	Best Special Production	Max Lang, Daniel Snaddon & Magic Light Pictures	Won
The Snail and the Whale	British Animation Awards, 2020	Best Voice Performance	Sally Hawkins	Won
The Snail and the Whale	British Animation Awards, 2020	Best Longform, Best Use of Sound	Max Lang, Daniel Snaddon & Magic Light Pictures	Nominated
The Snail and the Whale	New York International Children's Film Festival, 2020	Audience Award: Ages 3–5	Max Lang, Daniel Snaddon & Magic Light Pictures	Won
The Snail and the Whale	BANFF Rockie's Awards, 2020	Best Children's Animation	Max Lang, Daniel Snaddon & Magic Light Pictures	Won
The Snail and the Whale	Venice TV Awards, 2020	Children/Youth award	Max Lang, Daniel Snaddon & Magic Light Pictures	Won
The Snail and the Whale	Cartoons on the Bay, 2020	Punchinello Award for Best Short Film	Max Lang, Daniel Snaddon & Magic Light Pictures	Won
The Snail and the Whale	Sapporo International Short Film Festival, 2020	International Competition: Children's Short Bronze Award	Max Lang, Daniel Snaddon & Magic Light Pictures	Won
The Snail and the Whale	Xiamen International Animation Festival, 2020	Silver Award, Best Animated Short Film	Max Lang, Daniel Snaddon & Magic Light Pictures	Won
The Snail and the Whale	Chicago International Children's Film Festival, 2020	2nd Prize, Animated TV	Max Lang, Daniel Snaddon & Magic Light Pictures	Won
Zog	International Emmy Awards, 2020	Best Kids Animation	Max Lang, Daniel Snaddon & Magic Light Pictures	Won
Zog	Royal Television Society, 2020	Children's Programme Award	Max Lang, Daniel Snaddon & Magic Light Pictures	Won
Zog	Shanghai International TV Festival, 2019	Best Animation	Max Lang, Daniel Snaddon & Magic Light Pictures	Won
Zog	New York International Children's Festival, 2019	Audience Award: 3-6	Max Lang, Daniel Snaddon & Magic Light Pictures	Won
Zog	Annie Awards, 2020	Best Special Production and Best Storyboarding (Max Lang)	Max Lang, Daniel Snaddon & Magic Light Pictures	Nominated
Zog	British Animation Awards, 2020	Best Longform	Max Lang, Daniel Snaddon & Magic Light Pictures	Nominated
Zog	Kidscreen, 2020	Best One-Off, Special or TV Movie	Max Lang, Daniel Snaddon & Magic Light Pictures	Nominated
The Highway Rat	Rose d'Or	Children and Youth	Magic Light Pictures	Won
The Highway Rat	New York International Children's Film Festival, 2018	Audience Award: 3-6	Magic Light Pictures	Won
The Highway Rat	Vila do Conde International Short Film Festival, 2018	Curtinhas Prize	Magic Light Pictures	Won
The Highway Rat	Annecy International Animated Film Festival, 2018	Best TV Special	Magic Light Pictures	Nominated
The Highway Rat	Annie Awards, 2019	Best Animated Special Production	Magic Light Pictures	Nominated
Revolting Rhymes	90th Academy Awards	Best Animated Short Film	Jakob Schuh & Jan Lachauer	Nominated
Revolting Rhymes	70th British Academy Film Awards	Best Animation	Jakob Schuh, Jan Lachauer, Martin Pope & Michael Rose	Won
Revolting Rhymes	6th International Emmy Kids Awards	Kids: Animation	Michael Rose, Martin Pope & Magic Light Pictures	Won
Revolting Rhymes	Annecy, 2017	Best TV Special	Jakob Schuh, Jan Lachauer & Magic Light Pictures	Won
Revolting Rhymes	Annie Awards, 2018	Best Animated Special Production	Magic Light Pictures	Won
Revolting Rhymes	Kidscreen Awards, 2018	Best One-Off, Special or TV Movie: Kids	Magic Light Pictures	Won
Revolting Rhymes	Shanghai International TV Festival, 2017	Best Storytelling: Animation	Magic Light Pictures	Won
Stick Man	69th British Academy Film Awards	Best Animation	Production Team	Nominated
Stick Man	British Animation Awards	Best Use of Sound	Adrian Rhodes & Magic Light Pictures	Won
Stick Man	British Animation Awards	Best Voice Performance	Martin Freeman & Magic Light Pictures	Won
Stick Man	British Animation Awards	Best Long Form	Jeroen Jaspaert, Daniel Snaddon & Magic Light Pictures	Nominated
Stick Man	Annecy International Animated Film Festival	Best TV Production	Magic Light Pictures	Won
Stick Man	Kidscreen Awards	Best One-Off, Special or TV Movie: Kids; Best Directing (Jeroen Jaspaert); Best Music (Adrian Rhodes); and Best Design (Sam King)	Magic Light Pictures	Won
Stick Man	Banff Television Festival	Best Animation	Magic Light Pictures	Won
Stick Man	Shanghai International TV Festival	Best Animation	Magic Light Pictures	Won
Stick Man	Singapore International Children's Film Festival	Audience Choice Award	Magic Light Pictures	Won
Stick Man	Bangalore Shorts Film Festival	Best Animation	Magic Light Pictures	Won
