= Magic Light Pictures =

British film production company

Magic Light Pictures Limited
- Formerly: Orange Eyes Limited (2008–2019)
- Type: Film Production Company; Brand Licensing
- Founded: 2003; 23 years ago
- Founders: Martin Pope; Michael Rose
- Headquarters: London, England
- Subsidiaries: Stirling Animation Studio
- Website: magiclightpictures.com

Magic Light Pictures Limited is a British independent film and television production company based in London, England. The company was founded in 2003 by producers Martin Pope and Michael Rose.

== Productions ==
Since 2009, Magic Light Pictures has produced thirteen half-hour animated specials based on the best-selling children's story books by Julia Donaldson and Axel Scheffler: The Gruffalo (2009), The Gruffalo's Child (2011), Room on the Broom (2012), Stick Man (2015), The Highway Rat (2017), Zog (2018), The Snail and the Whale (2019), Zog and the Flying Doctors (2020), Superworm (2021), The Smeds and the Smoos (2022), Tabby McTat (2023), Tiddler (2024) and The Scarecrows' Wedding (2025). Overall, their productions have won more than 40 awards, including two Children's BAFTAs and the Prix Jeunesse, and have been nominated three times for an Academy Award for Best Short Animation. Their most recent production, The Scarecrows' Wedding, premiered on BBC One during Christmas Day 2025, and was watched by more than 8.7 million viewers.

Their other productions include the Oscar-nominated Revolting Rhymes (2016), a live-action/animated short based on The Velveteen Rabbit (2023), a preschool animated TV series called Pip and Posy (2021), and feature films including the Oscar-nominated Spanish-language animated feature Chico and Rita (2010), a comedy thriller starring Bill Nighy and Emily Blunt called Wild Target (2010), the British English version of a Danish-language animated feature called Terkel in Trouble (2006), and a romantic comedy feature starring Shaun Evans and Stockard Channing called Sparkle (2007).

== Filmography ==
Title	Year	Co-produced with	Type
Terkel in Trouble (English UK dub)	2006	A. Film Production	Animated feature
Sparkle	2007	Isle of Man Film	Romantic comedy
Glorious 39	2009	BBC Film; Quickfire Films; Screen East Content Investment Fund; Talkback Thames; UK Film Council	Thriller
The Gruffalo	2009	Studio Soi	Animated short
Wild Target	2010	CinemaNX; Isle of Man Film; Matador Pictures	Black comedy
Chico and Rita	2010	Fernando Trueba PC; Estudio Mariscal	Animated feature
The Gruffalo's Child	2011	Studio Soi	Animated short
One Life	2011	IM Global; BBC Earth Films	Documentary
Room on the Broom	2012	Studio Soi	Animated short
Stick Man	2015	Triggerfish Animation Studios	Animated short
Revolting Rhymes	2016	Triggerfish Animation Studios	Animated short
The Highway Rat	2017	Triggerfish Animation Studios	Animated short
Zog	2018	Triggerfish Animation Studios	Animated short
The Snail and the Whale	2019	Triggerfish Animation Studios	Animated short
Zog and the Flying Doctors	2020	Giant Creative	Animated short
Superworm	2021	Blue Zoo Animation Studio	Animated short
Pip and Posy	2021	Blue Zoo Animation Studio	Animated TV series
The Smeds and the Smoos	2022	Blue Zoo Animation Studio	Animated short
The Velveteen Rabbit	2023	Samson Films; Red Knuckles Studio	Live action/animated short
Tabby McTat	2023	Red Star 3D	Animated short
Tiddler	2024	Red Star 3D	Animated short
The Scarecrows' Wedding	2025	Red Star 3D	Animated short
The Baddies	2026		Animated short

== Awards and nominations ==
Production	Ceremony	Category	Recipient	Result
The Snail and the Whale	British Academy Children's Awards	Best Director	Magic Light Pictures	Won
The Snail and the Whale	British Academy Children's Awards	Best Animation	Magic Light Pictures	Won
The Highway Rat	46th Annie Awards	Best Animated Special Production	Magic Light Pictures	Nominated
The Highway Rat	Rose d'Or	Children and Youth	Magic Light Pictures	Won
Revolting Rhymes	90th Academy Awards	Best Animated Short Film	Jakob Schuh; Jan Lachauer	Nominated
Revolting Rhymes	British Academy Children's Awards	Best Animation	Jakob Schuh; Jan Lachauer; Martin Pope; Michael Rose	Won
Revolting Rhymes	6th International Emmy Kids Awards	Kids: Animation	Michael Rose; Martin Pope; Magic Light Pictures	Won
Stick Man	British Academy Children's Awards	Best Animation	Production Team	Nominated
Stick Man	British Animation Awards	Best Use of Sound	Adrian Rhodes; Magic Light Pictures	Won
Stick Man	British Animation Awards	Best Voice Performance	Martin Freeman; Magic Light Pictures	Won
Stick Man	British Animation Awards	Best Long Form	Jeroen Jaspaert; Daniel Snaddon; Magic Light Pictures	Nominated
Room on the Broom	86th Academy Awards	Best Animated Short Film	Max Lang; Jan Lachauer	Nominated
Room on the Broom	British Academy Children's Awards	Best Animation	Max Lang; Jan Lachauer; Magic Light Pictures	Won
Room on the Broom	International Emmy Kids Awards	Kids: Animation	Max Lang; Jan Lachauer; Magic Light Pictures	Won
The Gruffalo's Child	British Animation Awards	Best Long Form	Johannes Weiland; Uwe Heidschötter	Won
The Gruffalo's Child	British Academy Children's Awards	Best Animation	Johannes Weiland; Uwe Heidschötter; Magic Light Pictures	Nominated
Chico and Rita	84th Academy Awards	Best Animated Feature	Fernando Trueba; Javier Mariscal	Nominated
The Gruffalo	83rd Academy Awards	Best Animated Short Film	Jakob Schuh; Max Lang	Nominated
The Gruffalo	62nd British Academy Film Awards	Best Short Animation	Michael Rose; Martin Pope; Jakob Schuh; Max Lang	Nominated
The Gruffalo	Prix Jeunesse International	Prix Jeunesse 7-11 Fiction	Magic Light Pictures	Won
The Gruffalo	Prix Jeunesse International	Prize of the Children's Jury 7-11 Fiction	Magic Light Pictures	Won

== Licensing ==
Magic Light Pictures runs a licensing programme and has ranges of products and merchandise carried in Sainsbury's, Debenhams, John Lewis, Waterstones, and M&S, among others. Launched in 2009, the programme has markets in Germany, Australia, Scandinavia, New Zealand and the USA. Products available in The Gruffalo brand include plush, stationery, homewares, games, toys and apparel.

Magic Light has won five Licensing Awards for their branded apparel, furniture and Forestry Commission trails.

=== Brand partnerships ===
Magic Light Pictures has several award-winning brand partnerships with organisations including Chessington World of Adventures Resort, Forestry Commission England and Arla milk.

The Chessington World of Adventures Resort currently hosts the Gruffalo River Ride Adventure, themed hotel rooms, an arena dedicated to the films and characters, and a food outlet. In March 2019 Chessington launched a Room on the Broom attraction with specifically themed hotel rooms.

Since 2014, The Forestry Commission has worked with Magic Light on providing free, self-led trails based on the Gruffalo brand family on over 20 sites around the UK, as well as offering Gruffalo orienteering, Gruffalo sculptures in several forests, and an augmented reality app, The Gruffalo Spotter.

2019 marked the 20th anniversary of Julia Donaldson and Axel Scheffler's Gruffalo book and 10 years since the premiere of the animated special on BBC One. As part of the celebration, Magic Light partnered with the Royal Mint to release a set of commemorative silver and gold fifty pence collectors' coins, and with the Royal Mail to release a set of bespoke Gruffalo stamps.

== Apps ==
Since 2013, Magic Light Pictures has developed a range of mini-game and augmented reality apps based around the Gruffalo brand family. Room on the Broom: Games and Gruffalo: Games were both nominated for a Children's BAFTA in the Interactive Adapted category in 2014 and 2015 respectively.

The Gruffalo Spotter app, launched in early 2017, is an augmented reality app that works alongside the Forestry Commission trails, where users can follow a set of clues and signs to locate animated characters from the book and take photos with them. The app was nominated at the 2017 BAFTA awards in the Interactive category.
