= The Snail and the Whale =

Children's book by Julia Donaldson and Axel Scheffler

- Author: Julia Donaldson
- Audio read by: Imelda Staunton (on the audio cassette release); David Tennant (on the compact disc release)
- Illustrator: Axel Scheffler
- Genre: Children's fantasy
- Publisher: Macmillan
- Publication date: 5 September 2003
- Publication place: United Kingdom
- Pages: 32
- ISBN: 978-0-330-51734-8
- OCLC: 51898638

The Snail and the Whale is a 2003 children's picture book written by Julia Donaldson and illustrated by Axel Scheffler. It won the 2004 Early Years award for the best pre-school book, the 2005 Blue Peter award for Best Book to Read Aloud, and the 2007 Giverny award for Best Science Picture Book. The Snail and the Whale has also been adapted into an unabridged audiobook, a stage play and translated into British Sign Language. In 2019, a short film based on the book was released.

Donaldson has said that it is one of her favourite books, due to its similarity in rhyming style to the works of Edward Lear, of which she was fond of as a child.

== Plot ==
A small sea snail wants to travel the world, despite other snails' disapproval. Using her slime trail, the snail writes a message seeking a ride for her journey, and humpback whale answers. Together they travel, passing icebergs, volcanoes, sharks and penguins. Then, one morning, the whale becomes stranded in a bay and becomes stranded.

In an effort to help her friend, the snail herself crawls to a nearby school in the bay, and writes "Save The Whale!" in her slimy trail on the blackboard. The school's children and teacher immediately fetch the emergency services, and the local people and fire department help to keep the abandoned whale wet until the tide finally turns. The snail and the whale are able to refloat and swim safely away from the villagers, who wave and cheer them on.

Together, the snail and the whale return to the snail's home in the dock, where the other members in the snail flock are impressed by the two travellers' tales. The whale holds out his tail, allowing the other snails to crawl on board. Then, as the sun sinks behind the surface of the ocean, the humpback whale takes the entire snail flock away, presumably to further adventures.

== Recognition ==
The book won the Early Years award for the best pre-school book in 2004, the Blue Peter award for Best Book to Read Aloud, 2005, and the Giverny award for Best Science Picture Book 2007.

The audio book won the 2004 Spoken Book gold award for best audio for ages six and under.

== Adaptations and editions ==
The story is available as a paperback, a board book, a jigsaw puzzle book, a colouring book, an activity and sticker book, an audiobook with an accompanying audio CD, a magnetic book and a "Read Along" book with an accompanying magnetic audio tape. The paperback edition is dedicated by Julia Donaldson: "For Everyone at Hillhead Primary School, Wick".

The audiobook with an accompanying audio cassette, is narrated by English voice actor Imelda Staunton, while the audiobook with an accompanying compact disc is narrated by Scottish voice actor David Tennant.

The Snail and the Whale was adapted for the stage by the theatre company Tall Stories in 2012, and has been on tour around the United Kingdom and the rest of the world.

A short animated film adaptation of the same name was released for Christmas 2019 on BBC One. Magic Light Pictures produced the film, while the animation was provided by Triggerfish Animation Studios. It was released on DVD on 10 February 2020 in the United Kingdom.

=== Voice cast ===
- Diana Rigg as the Narrator
- Sally Hawkins as the Snail
- Rob Brydon as the Whale
- Cariad Lloyd as the Teacher
- Arnold Brown and Emma Tate as the snail flock
- Max Lang as the Fish in the Sea
- William Barber, David Cummings, Charlotte-Davis Black, Emmy Dowers and Mia Wilks as the school children

== Reviews ==
The Times called it: 'Bold and brilliant, wise and wacky'. The Guardian said it was 'a joy to read aloud', and included it a list of best children's books for ages 2 to 4.
