= Jakob Schuh =

German director (born 1976)

- Born: 26 March 1976 (age 49); Munich, West Germany
- Occupation(s): Animator, director, producer and writer
- Years active: 1997–present

Jakob Schuh is a German animator, best known for his animated film, Revolting Rhymes Part One & Two for which he received critical acclaim and received an Academy Award nomination for Academy Award for Best Animated Short Film.

== Filmography ==
- 2016: Revolting Rhymes Part One & Two (TV Short)
- 2011–2013: The Amazing World of Gumball (TV Series) (titles - 22 episodes)
- 2009: The Gruffalo (TV Short)
- 2007: Ernst im Herbst (Short)
- 2007: Waltraut and Kuno (Short)
- 2007: Room on the Broom (TV Short) (character design consultant)
- 2007: Waltraut and Kuno (Short) (character designer)
- 2005: Torvald and the Fir Tree (Short)
- 2004: Strasse der Spezialisten (Short)
- 2002: Bunnies (Short)
- 2001: Celebrity Deathmatch Hits Germany (TV Series) (storyboard artist - 1 episode)
- 1997: The Fearless Four (character posing artist)

== Awards and nominations ==
- Nominated: Academy Award for Best Animated Short Film
