= The Gruffalo (film) =

- North American promotional poster
- Based on: The Gruffalo by Julia Donaldson
- Written by: Julia Donaldson; Axel Scheffler
- Directed by: Max Lang; Jakob Schuh
- Voices of: Helena Bonham Carter; Rob Brydon; Robbie Coltrane; James Corden; John Hurt; Tom Wilkinson
- Narrated by: Helena Bonham Carter
- Theme music composer: René Aubry
- Countries of origin: United Kingdom; Germany
- Original languages: English; German

Production
- Producers: Martin Pope; Michael Rose
- Editor: Robin Sales
- Running time: 27 minutes
- Production companies: Magic Light Pictures; Orange Eyes; Studio Soi

Original release
- Network: BBC One; Nick Jr.
- Release: 25 December 2009
- Network: ZDF
- Release: 24 December 2010

The Gruffalo is a 2009 animated fantasy short television film based on the 1999 picture book written by Julia Donaldson and illustrated by Axel Scheffler.

Directed by Jakob Schuh and Max Lang, the film was produced by Michael Rose and Martin Pope of Magic Light Pictures and Orange Eyes Limited in association with the award-winning Studio Soi in Ludwigsburg who developed and created the film., and produced in association with the BBC, Nick Jr. and ZDF.

The cast includes Helena Bonham Carter, Rob Brydon, James Corden, Robbie Coltrane, John Hurt, and Tom Wilkinson.

9.8 million people watched the UK premiere on BBC One, Friday 25 December 2009 and the film went on to receive nominations for both an Academy Award and a BAFTA.

It was screened in US theatres, distributed by Kidtoon Films. In December 2012, the film and its sequel The Gruffalo's Child premiered on television in the United States on Disney Junior, and in December 2017 – 2018, the film and its sequel premiered on television in the United States on the Disney Junior channel.

== Plot ==
In an autumn forest, a red squirrel mother finds a nut. Her children are playing until they see an owl. The mother squirrel drops the nut as she escapes from the owl, but her children ask her to tell them a story before she retrieves it. So she tells the story of a mouse strolling through a deep dark wood.

The mouse, who is hungry, makes a journey to a nut tree and encounters a fox, who tries to persuade him to have lunch with him. The mouse responds by making up a story that he is instead having lunch with a "Gruffalo", a monster with "terrible tusks and terrible claws and terrible teeth in his terrible jaws". When he tells the fox that the Gruffalo's favorite food is "roasted fox", the fox runs away in fright.

The mouse uses the same trick to survive encounters with an owl and a snake, telling them that the Gruffalo's favorite food is "owl ice cream" and "scrambled snake", respectively, while adding details about the Gruffalo's appearance at each encounter. Later, the three animals meet and talk about their encounters with the mouse and realize that they have been tricked.

The mouse finally reaches the nut tree and suddenly encounters with a real Gruffalo, which is exactly as he had described it. When the Gruffalo catches and threatens to eat him, the mouse uses his wits again and says that everyone in the wood is afraid of him, asking the Gruffalo to follow him and see. As the two of them meet the predators, the presence of the Gruffalo frightens them away, but the Gruffalo believes they are afraid of the mouse. As the Gruffalo prepares to eat the mouse, the mouse's stomach growls and he says his favorite food is Gruffalo crumble, causing the Gruffalo to retreat in fear. Finally safe, he finds the nut from earlier, which the Gruffalo had knocked down, and eats it in peace.

When the mother squirrel ends her story, the children feel better and they all go to retrieve their nut as snow begins to fall.

== Voice cast ==
- Helena Bonham Carter as Mother Squirrel/Narrator
- Rob Brydon as Snake
- Robbie Coltrane as Gruffalo
- James Corden as Mouse
- John Hurt as Owl
- Tom Wilkinson as Fox
- Sam Lewis as Boy Squirrel
- Phoebe Givron-Taylor as Girl Squirrel

== Background and production ==
The Gruffalo, written by Julia Donaldson and illustrated by Axel Scheffler, was published in 1999 and has sold over 5 million copies worldwide. In a BBC Radio 2 poll in 2009, the book was voted as the UK's favourite bedtime story. The book has been adapted into a 27-minute animated film, which was broadcast on BBC One in the UK on 25 December 2009. This new version features Robbie Coltrane in the title role and James Corden as the mouse as well as Helena Bonham Carter as the mother squirrel narrator and Rob Brydon as the Snake. The production was animated at the award-winning Studio Soi in Germany and produced through Magic Light Pictures. The film also has the voices of John Hurt as the Owl and Tom Wilkinson as the Fox. It was nominated for an Academy Award for Best Short Film (Animated) on 25 January 2011. The film was also nominated for a BAFTA in 2010.

The 2009 television special was to celebrate the 10th anniversary of the book's release in 1999.

== Reception ==
The film premiered on BBC One, Christmas Day 2009, watched by 9.8 million people. Review website Den of Geek described it as an "utterly charming piece of magic".

The film has been broadcast across the world, including on ZDF in Germany. It premiered on United States television on 9 December 2010 on ABC Family during its 25 Days of Christmas programming block. It also aired on YTV in Canada on 18 December 2011.

The Gruffalo has been shown on Nick Jr. in the UK and is distributed on DVD by Entertainment One. NCircle distribute the DVD in the US, Kaboom Entertainment, Phase 4 Films, and Nelvana in Canada, and Concorde in Germany.

A Scottish Gaelic version has been produced, with the voice of the Gruffalo provided by Bill Paterson. An Gruffalo was first shown on BBC Alba on Christmas Eve 2010.

The film has also proved a hit with festival audiences around the world. On top of its Academy Award and BAFTA nominations, it has also been awarded prizes at festivals including the Annecy International Animation Festival (France), Anima Mundi (Brazil), The Broadcast Awards 2011 (UK), Cartoons on the Bay (Italy), Chicago International Children's Festival (USA), CFC Worldwide Short Film Festival (Canada), Ottawa International Animation Festival (Canada), Prix Jeunesse (Germany??), Sapporo Short Fest (Japan), Shanghai Television Festival (China) and Internationales Trick Film Festival (Germany). The Gruffalo was also nominated for the prestigious Cartoon d'or 2011.

== Awards and nominations ==
Ceremony	Recipient	Category	Result
83rd Academy Awards	Jakob Schuh; Max Lang	Best Animated Short Film	Nominated
63rd British Academy Film Awards	Michael Rose; Martin Pope; Jakob Schuh; Max Lang	Best Short Animation	Nominated
Cartoon d'or	Jakob Schuh; Max Lang	Cartoon d’Or	Nominated
Anima Mundi Festival 2010	Jakob Schuh; Max Lang	Best Short For Children	Won
Annecy International Animated Film Festival 2010	Jakob Schuh; Max Lang	Award For Best TV Special	Won
Broadcast Awards 2011	Magic Light Pictures in association with Studio Soi	Best Children's Programme	Won
CFC Worldwide Short Film Festival 2011	Jakob Schuh; Max Lang	Audience Award	Won
Chicago International Children's Film Festival	Jakob Schuh; Max Lang	Best of the Fest	Won
Ottawa International Animation Festival 2010	Jakob Schuh; Max Lang	Best Television Animation Made for Children	Won
Sapporo Short Fest 2010	Jakob Schuh; Max Lang	Children's Choice Award Silver	Won

== Sequel ==
The first sequel, based on The Gruffalo's Child, was shown on BBC One on Christmas Day 2011. The second sequel, based on Gruffalo Granny, is in development.

== See also ==
- Room on the Broom
