= Apple Studios =

Film and television production company

Apple Studios LLC
- Type: Subsidiary
- Industry: Entertainment
- Founded: October 2019; 7 years ago
- Headquarters: 8600 Hayden Place, Culver City, California, US; Apple Park, Cupertino, California, US
- Area served: Worldwide
- Key people: Zack Van Amburg; Jamie Erlicht
- Services: Film production; Television production
- Number of employees: 1,010 (2025)
- Parent: Apple
- Divisions: Apple Originals; Apple Original Films
- Footnotes "Apple Studios". productionlist.com. Film and Television Industry Alliance. 19 October 2020.

Apple Studios LLC is an American film, television and in-house production company that is a subsidiary of Apple. Founded in October 2019, it specializes in developing and producing original television series and films for Apple's digital video streaming service Apple TV as well as films that are intended for theatrical releases.

Their films are released through their Apple Original Films division, and their television shows are released simply under Apple Originals.

== History ==
In October 2019, The Hollywood Reporter reported that Apple was launching its own production company, overseen by Zack Van Amburg and Jamie Erlicht, to produce original television and film content for Apple TV+. In 2021, Jessie Henderson was tapped as a feature executive for Apple.

Beginning in 2023, Apple Studios decided to partner with major studios like Paramount Pictures, Sony Pictures, Universal Pictures and Warner Bros. Pictures to theatrically release some of its films like Killers of the Flower Moon, Napoleon (both 2023), Argylle, Fly Me to the Moon (both 2024), and F1 (2025). They would also own the distribution rights to the films for digital purchase and home video (although some of the films have yet to be released on home video), but Apple retains SVOD rights to the films.

In June 2024, International Alliance of Theatrical Stage Employees announced that it had filed National Labor Relations Board election while continuing its push to unionize Apple's visual effects employees as they asked the management to voluntarily recognize their workers' union. In September 2026, Variety reported that Apple Studios' visual effects workers had secured their first contract with International Alliance of Theatrical Stage Employees as they won new standard for wages, health care, retirement benefits, working hours, artificial intelligence and workplace safety as the contract also establishes minimum rates for every covered title.

== Apple Original Films ==
=== Highest-grossing films ===
Highest-grossing films
Rank	Title	Year	Worldwide gross
1	F1	2025	$633,342,436
2	Napoleon	2023	$221,394,838
3	Killers of the Flower Moon	2023	$158,772,599
4	Argylle	2024	$96,221,061
5	Fly Me to the Moon	2024	$42,260,534

=== 2020s ===
Title	Release date	Co-production(s)	Ref.
Come from Away	September 10, 2021	Entertainment One; Junkyard Dog Productions; RadicalMedia; Alchemy Production Group	
Blush	October 1, 2021	Skydance Animation	
Swan Song	December 17, 2021	Anonymous Content; Concordia Studio	
Luck	August 5, 2022	Skydance Animation	
Raymond & Ray	October 21, 2022	Mockingbird Pictures; Esperanto Filmoj	
Louis Armstrong's Black & Blues	October 28, 2022	Imagine Documentaries; PolyGram Entertainment	
Spirited	November 18, 2022	Gloria Sanchez Productions; Maximum Effort; Two Grown Men	
Emancipation	December 9, 2022	Overbrook Entertainment; Westbrook Studios; McFarland Entertainment; Escape Artists	
The Boy, the Mole, the Fox and the Horse	December 25, 2022	Bad Robot Productions; NoneMore Productions	
Sharper	February 10, 2023	A24; Picturestart; FortySixty; G&T Productions	
Tetris	March 31, 2023	AI Film; Marv Studios; Unigram	
Ghosted	April 21, 2023	Skydance Media; Reese Wernick Productions	
The Beanie Bubble	July 21, 2023	Imagine Entertainment	
Killers of the Flower Moon	October 20, 2023	Imperative Entertainment; Sikelia Productions; Appian Way Productions	
Napoleon	November 22, 2023	Scott Free Productions	
The Family Plan	December 15, 2023	Skydance Media; Municipal Pictures	
Argylle	February 2, 2024	Marv Studios; Cloudy Productions	
Fly Me to the Moon	July 12, 2024	These Pictures	
The Instigators	August 2, 2024	Artists Equity; Studio 8 The Walsh Company	
Wolfs	September 27, 2024	Plan B Entertainment; Smokehouse Pictures	
Blitz	November 1, 2024	New Regency; Lammas Park; Working Title Films	
The Gorge	February 14, 2025	Skydance Media; Lit Entertainment Group; Crooked Highway	
Fountain of Youth	May 23, 2025	Skydance Media; Vinson Films; Toff Guy Films; Project X Entertainment; Radio Silence Productions	
Echo Valley	June 13, 2025	Black Bicycle Entertainment; Scott Free Productions; The Walsh Company	
F1	June 27, 2025	Dawn Apollo Films; Jerry Bruckheimer Films; Monolith Pictures; Plan B Entertainment	
Highest 2 Lowest	August 15, 2025	A24; Mandalay Pictures; Escape Artists; 40 Acres and a Mule Filmworks; Juniper Productions	
The Lost Bus	September 19, 2025	Comet Pictures; Blumhouse Productions	
The Family Plan 2	November 21, 2025	Skydance Media; Municipal Pictures	
Outcome	April 10, 2026	Strong Baby Productions	
Mayday	September 4, 2026	Skydance Media; Maximum Effort	
Matchbox: The Movie	October 9, 2026	Skydance Media; Mattel Studios	
Tenzing	October 9, 2026	India Take One; See-Saw Films; Stranger Than Fiction Films	
Being Heumann	November 6, 2026	The Walsh Company; Gravity Squared Entertainment; Permut Presentations	

=== Upcoming ===
Title	Release date	Co-production(s)	Status	Ref.
Way of the Warrior Kid	November 25, 2026	Skydance Media; Wonderland Sound and Vision; Everard Entertainment; Indivisible Productions	Completed	
Weekend Warriors	TBA	Plan B Entertainment; SpringHill Company	Post-production	
Liminal	TBA	AWA Studios; The Walsh Company	Filming	
Sponsor	TBA	Platinum Dunes	Filming	
What Happens at Night	TBA	StudioCanal; Sikelia Productions; Appian Way Productions	Filming	
Running	TBA	Makeready; Nike, Inc.	Filming	
Snoopy Unleashed	TBA	Apple Animation Studios; WildBrain Studios; Peanuts Worldwide	In production	
Foster the Snowman	TBA	The Walsh Company	Pre-production	
The Waffle House Index	TBA	Plan B Entertainment	Pre-production	
One Month Mark	TBA	Chernin Entertainment; Excellent Cadaver	Pre-production	
Sacrament	TBA	Chernin Entertainment; Keep Quiet Productions; MegaMix	Pre-production	
Five Secrets	TBA	Chernin Entertainment	In development	
The Flick	TBA	Chernin Entertainment	In development	
Last Flight Out	TBA	Chernin Entertainment; Dark Horse Entertainment	In development	
Oregon Trail	TBA	Ampersand; HarperCollins Productions	In development	
Two for the Money	TBA	Denver and Delilah Productions; Perfect Storm Entertainment; Roth/Kirschenbaum Films	In development	
The Wives	TBA	A24; Excellent Cadaver bb²	In development	
Connector	TBA	Plan B Entertainment	Pre-production	

== Apple Originals ==
=== 2020s ===
Title	Release date	Co-production(s)	Ref.
Harriet the Spy	November 19, 2021	Postworks New York; The Jim Henson Company; Wellsville Pictures; Titmouse, Inc.	
The Last Days of Ptolemy Grey	March 11, 2022	Anonymous Content	
WeCrashed	March 18, 2022	Paradox Productions	
Black Bird	July 8, 2022	EMJAG Productions; Imperative Entertainment; Eden Productions; Crime Story; Hans Bubby	
Surface	July 29, 2022	Hello Sunshine	
Life by Ella	September 2, 2022	Hat on a Hat Productions	
Echo 3	November 23, 2022	Easy Street Productions; Keshet Studios	
Shape Island	January 20, 2023	Bix Pix Entertainment	
Dear Edward	February 3, 2023	True Jack Productions	
Hello Tomorrow!	February 17, 2023	MRC Television; Mortal Media; Froward Enterprise; Ceremony Pictures; Hooptie Filmed Entertainment	
City on Fire	May 12, 2023	Fake Empire	
High Desert	May 17, 2023	Red Hour Productions; Delirious Media; Radish Pictures; Ook Pik Productions; Spoon Productions; 3 Arts Entertainment; My Fist Productions	
The Crowded Room	June 9, 2023	New Regency Television; Weed Road Pictures; EMJAG Productions	
Strange Planet	August 9, 2023	Harmonious Claptrap; Nathan W Pyle; ShadowMachine; Mercury Filmworks	
Invasion (season 2)	August 23, 2023	Kinberg Genre; Boat Rocker Media	
The Changeling	September 8, 2023	Dela Revoluciøn; August 17; Annapurna Television	
Lessons in Chemistry	October 13, 2023	The Great Unknown Productions; Piece of Work Entertainment; Aggregate Films	
Masters of the Air	January 26, 2024	Playtone; Amblin Television	
The New Look	February 14, 2024	Di Bonaventura Pictures	
Manhunt	March 15, 2024	Dovetale Productions; Monarch Pictures; POV Entertainment; Walden Media; 3 Arts Entertainment; Lionsgate Television	
Palm Royale	March 20, 2024	Jaywalker Pictures; Pattiwhack Pictures; Wyolah Entertainment; Platform One Media; Boat Rocker Media	
Sugar	April 5, 2024	Chapel Place Productions; Protokino; Genre Films	
Franklin	April 12, 2024	Flame Ventures; EDEN Productions; Shadowcatcher Productions; Boil Some Water Entertainment; ITV Studios	
Frog and Toad (season 2)	May 31, 2024	Titmouse, Inc.	
Me	July 12, 2024	Houston Pictures	
Disclaimer	October 11, 2024	Esperanto Filmoj; Anonymous Content	
Silo (season 3)	November 15, 2024	Mímir Films; Nemo Films; AMC Studios	
Goldie	February 14, 2025	Mercury Filmworks; Li'l Touhgy	
Dope Thief	March 14, 2025	Night Owl Stories; Scott Free Productions	
Your Friends & Neighbors	April 11, 2025	Tropper Ink; Forward Entertainment	
Government Cheese	April 16, 2025	Street Carr Productions; Yoruba Saxon; Ventureland; MACRO Television Studios	
Stick	June 4, 2025	Propagate; Entertainment 360; Kellerama	
Smoke	June 27, 2025	Mikey Beers; EDEN Productions; Imperative Entertainment	
The Sisters Grimm	October 2, 2025	Titmouse, Inc.	
The Last Frontier	October 10, 2025	Pickpocket Entertainment	
Imperfect Women	March 18, 2026	20th Television	
Widow's Bay	April 29, 2026	Chum Films; Spooky Tree	
Maximum Pleasure Guaranteed	May 20, 2026	Genre Films; Counterpoint Studios	
Star City	May 29, 2026	Tall Ship Productions; Sony Pictures Television	
Lucky	July 15, 2026	Tropper Ink; Hello Sunshine; LadyKiller	

=== Upcoming ===
Title	Release date	Co-production(s)	Status	Ref.
Wild Things	April 16, 2027	Imagine Television	Post-production	
The Savant	TBA	Fifth Season; Anonymous Content; Freckle Films	Completed	
Severance (season 3)	TBA	Red Hour Productions; Fifth Season	Pre-production	
Untitled Negro league baseball series	TBA	Kapital Entertainment	In development	
Lure	TBA	Team Downey	Ordered	
