= The Velveteen Rabbit (2023 film) =

2023 British short film

- Promotional poster
- Directed by: Jennifer Perrott (live action); Rick Thiele (animation)
- Written by: Tom Bidwell
- Based on: The Velveteen Rabbit by Margery Williams
- Produced by: Martin Pope; Tom Bidwell; Michael Rose
- Starring: Phoenix Laroche; Alex Lawther; Helena Bonham Carter; Nicola Coughlan
- Cinematography: James Mather
- Edited by: Sarah Brewerton
- Music by: Anne Dudley
- Production company: Magic Light Pictures
- Distributed by: Apple TV+
- Release date: 22 November 2023
- Running time: 44 minutes
- Country: United Kingdom
- Language: English

The Velveteen Rabbit is a 2023 live-action/animated fantasy short film based on the novel of the same name. It was directed by Jennifer Perrott and Rick Thiele, and written by Tom Bidwell. It features Phoenix Laroche and the voices of Alex Lawther, Helena Bonham Carter, and Nicola Coughlan.

Produced by Magic Light Pictures, the 44-minute special was released by Apple TV+ on 22 November 2023.

== Cast ==
- Phoenix Laroche as William

=== Voice and animated cast ===
- Alex Lawther as Velveteen Rabbit
- Helena Bonham Carter as Wise Horse
- Nicola Coughlan as Playroom Fairy
- Paterson Joseph as King
- Lois Chimimba as Car
- Clive Rowe as Lion
- Nathaniel Parker as Male Rabbit
- Bethany Antonia as Female Rabbit

== Production ==
=== Filming ===
The main filming took place in the two-story Tibradden House in the Rathfarnham suburb of County South Dublin, Republic of Ireland. The building is a designated local heritage site in Ireland and has previously been used as a film location for other films.

== Reception ==
On the review aggregator website Rotten Tomatoes, 100% of 9 critics' reviews are positive, with an average rating of 7.5/10.

Rachel Aroesti of The Guardian awarded the special three stars out of five, praising the performances and emotional story.
