= Stick Man =

2008 children's book by Julia Donaldson

- Author: Julia Donaldson
- Illustrator: Axel Scheffler
- Language: English
- Genre: Children's
- Publisher: Macmillan
- Publication date: 1 September 2008
- Publication place: United Kingdom
- Pages: 32
- ISBN: 978-1407108827

Stick Man, written by former Children's Laureate Julia Donaldson and illustrated by Axel Scheffler, is a children's story about an anthropomorphic wooden stick who becomes separated from his family home and his Odyssey-like adventure to return there. He is eventually reunited with his family in the "family tree" as a result of his interaction with Father Christmas. It takes place in England.

Stick Man has sold over 2 million copies worldwide and has been adapted into a short animated film and a successful stage play.

== Awards ==
- 2008 Roald Dahl Funny Prize
- 2009 Scottish Children's Book Awards shortlist

== Adaptations ==
The book was adapted into a short animated film by Jeroen Jaspaert and Daniel Snaddon in 2015, featuring the voice talents of Martin Freeman, Sally Hawkins, Jennifer Saunders, Hugh Bonneville and Rob Brydon and produced by Magic Light Pictures, the production team responsible for the Oscar-nominated short films The Gruffalo and Room on the Broom. The film premiered on BBC 1 on 25 December and was watched by 9.27 million viewers, being the fourth most-watched programme in the United Kingdom that day.

A stage play has also been created based on the original book which has been praised by Time Out and The Independent as well as an audio edition narrated by Imelda Staunton.

== See also ==
- List of Christmas-themed literature
