= Max Lang =

German film director

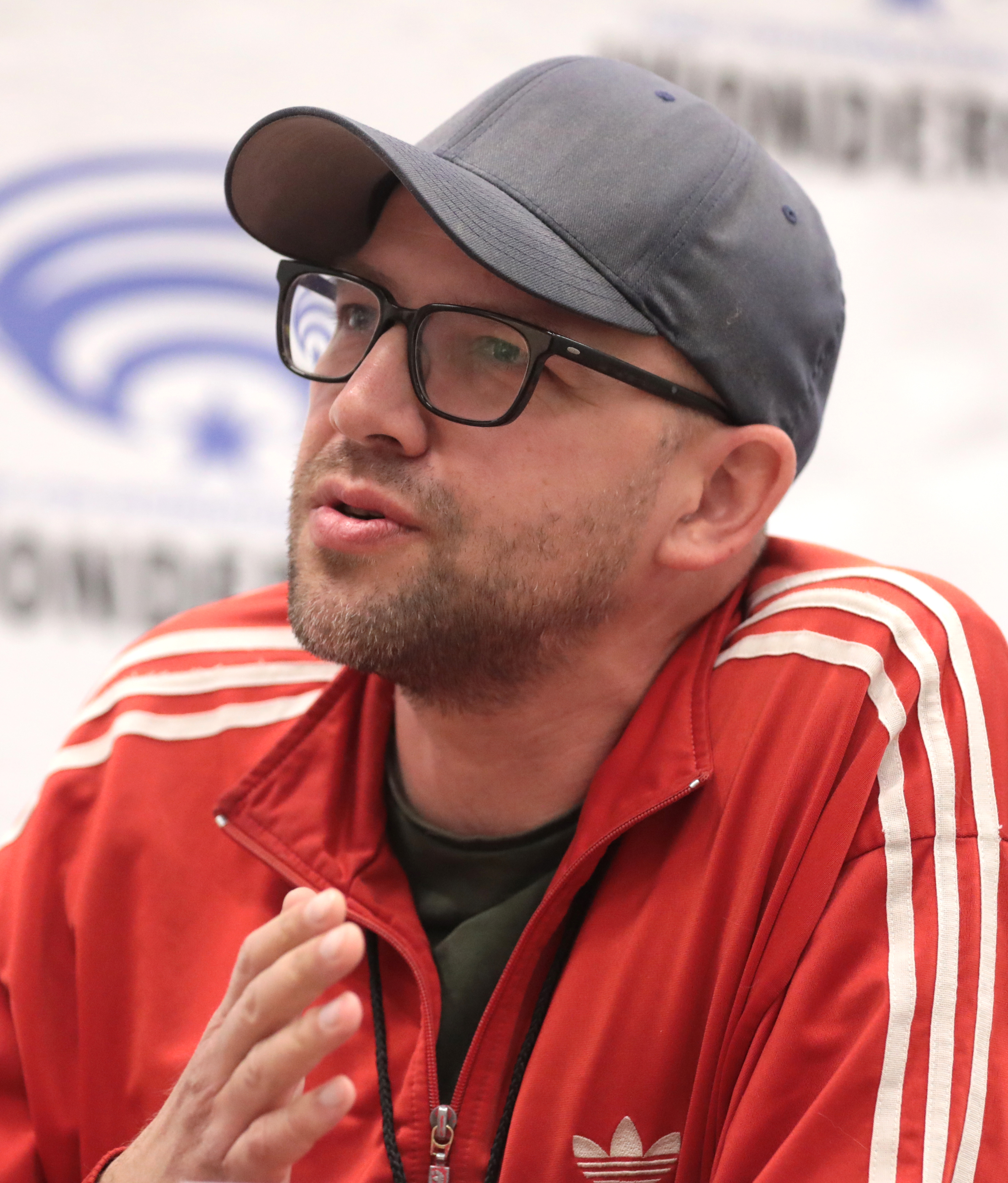
Lang at the 2023 WonderCon

Max Lang (born 1982) is a German-American film director and illustrator. He has been twice nominated Academy Awards in the category of Best Short Animated Film, for The Gruffalo in 2011, and for Room on the Broom in 2014.

He is also the director of the Nickelodeon animated television film Albert.

Lang illustrates books written by his wife, Suzanne Lang.

== Works ==
- Lang, Suzanne (2015). Families, Families, Families!. Illustrated by Max Lang. Random House. ISBN 9780375974267.
- Lang, Suzanne (2016). Hooray for Kids!. Illustrated by Max Lang. Random House. ISBN 9780553537833.
- Lang, Suzanne (2019). All Kinds of Families. Illustrated by Max Lang. Random House. ISBN 9780553499407.

=== Grumpy Monkey ===
- Lang, Suzanne (2018). Grumpy Monkey. Illustrated by Max Lang. Random House. ISBN 9780553537864.
- Lang, Suzanne (2019). Grumpy Monkey Party Time!. Illustrated by Max Lang. Random House. ISBN 9780593118627.
- Grumpy Monkey Up All Night (2020)
- Grumpy Monkey Oh, No! Christmas (2021)
- Grumpy Monkey Valentine Gross-Out (2022)
- Grumpy Monkey Don't Be Scared (2023)
- Grumpy Monkey Spring Fever (2024)
- Grumpy Monkey Play All Day (2024)
