= Peter Brewis =

English composer

Peter Brewis is a composer and instrumentalist who has been active in several spheres of music from ballet and modern dance to music theatre and rock music. Although he was classically trained, studying under the famous French music educator Nadia Boulanger, he has also written for comedy shows such as Spitting Image, for which he composed "I've Never Met a Nice South African."

== Career ==
Brewis studied composition at the Royal College of Music where he won the Cobbett Prize for composition. After graduation he took lessons in composition from Nadia Boulanger, studied electronic music with Lawrence Casserly and Javanese Gamelan with Alec Roth.

Brewis spent a period as composer-in-residence with Scottish Ballet's Movable Workshop. He composed the music for the company's joint production with Traverse Theatre of C. P. Taylor's Columba. Stuart Hopps was the choreographer. Other dance projects includes Finale for Charlie composed for Charles Augins and Endangered Species created for the Kosh Theatre Company.

He has composed several musicals. Some of these were for educational projects. However, his Don Quixote was composed for the husband and wife team of Reg Bolton and Annie Stainer and the Traverse Theatre. Mel Smith and Bob Goody were working on a two-man show at the same venue. Brewis teamed up with them and together they created three black comedy musicals, including Irony in Dorking which won a Fringe First Award and The Gambler whose 1986 revival at the Hampstead Theatre was nominated for an Olivier Award and was also recorded by the specialist musical theatre label First Night Records. Brewis's other musicals include Hansel and Gretel, put on at the Lyric Theatre, Hammersmith in 1999 and Rat's Ahoy, co-written with Ruby Wax but as yet unperformed though Brewis has provided music for other stage shows of hers. Another revue that won the Fringe First Award in which Brewis was involved was White Collar Club.

Brewis has collaborated on several of Smith's other projects. These include the television shows, Smith and Goody, Not the Nine O'clock News and Alas Smith and Jones, for the last two of which Brewis provided music and lyrics, the films Morons from Outer Space and The Tall Guy and the stage show Not in Front of the Audience in which the cast of Not the Nine'O'clock News performed Brewis's short musical Laker! as well as material from the television show, including several of Brewis's songs.

Other television shows on which Brewis has worked include the comedy programmes Three of a Kind, A Kick Up the Eighties, The Lenny Henry Show, Carrott's Lib, Lenny Beige and Spitting Image. Although he provided lyrics for all of these shows, Brewis also composed music for other people's lines, for example in the song I've Never Met a Nice South African which was the B-side for the chart-topping The Chicken Song. He has music credits for the shows The Strangerers, The History of the World, Filthy, Rich and Catflap, Hardwicke House, Friday Night Live, The Smell of Reeves and Mortimer, Hale and Pace, Comic Relief, The Young Ones, Angus Deayton's End of the Year Show and Too Much Sun. Brewis has also provided music for documentaries, children's programmes and commercials.

Film credits include About a Boy, for which Brewis wrote and composed "Santa's Super Sleigh", Staggered and several films by Vera Neubauer, Phil Mulloy and Claire Barwell. Brewis has also composed music for several stage plays, including a production of As You Like It which he himself directed at the Battersea Arts Centre.

Brewis has not only played his own music but he has also performed or recorded with a number of bands. These include;

- Swan Revived, who supported Hawkwind when they toured in 1973 at the height of the latter's success,
- the electronic-folk group Magnet which was formed for and appeared in the original film of The Wicker Man,
- Stomu Yamashta's large touring rock and dance troupe The Man from the East,
- the backing group of The Marvelettes
- and The Peter Straker Band who recorded an album for EMI co-produced by Freddie Mercury.

He has also been musical director for many shows, including:

- the Japanese tour by the original cast of The Rocky Horror Show,
- that show's transfer to the West End
- and the original run of Chorus Girls at the Theatre Royal, Stratford East.

== Sources ==
- Composer's website: contains biographical and career details as well as musical snippets.
