= List of Christmas television episodes and specials in the United Kingdom =

The following is a list of United Kingdom, Christmas television specials, as well as Christmas-themed episodes of regular television series.

== Drama ==
=== BBC ===
Series	Episode/special	Year	Description
A Christmas Carol		1977	
A Christmas Carol		2019	A three-part miniseries.
Auf Wiedersehen, Pet	"Au Revior"	2004	2 episodes
Black Christmas		1977	
Ballykissangel	"As Happy as a Turkey on Boxing Day"	1997	
Born and Bred	"A Very Ormston Christmas"	2003	
The Brothers	"The Christmas Party"	1976	
Chalkface	"Christmas Cheer"	1991	
Cranford	"Christmas Special"	2009	
Dr. Finlay's Casebook	"The Gifts of the Magi"	1966	
Lark Rise to Candleford	"Christmas Special"	2008	
Last Christmas		1999	
Last Tango in Halifax	"Christmas Special"	2013	
Lost Christmas		2011	
Maigret	"A Crime for Christmas"	1961	

==== All Creatures Great and Small ====
Episode/ Special	Year	Description
"Merry Gentlemen"	1978	
"Christmas Special"	1983	
"The Lord God Made Them All"	1985	
"Brotherly Love"	1990	

==== Bergerac ====
Episode/ Special	Year	Description
"Fires in Fall"	1986	
"Treasure Hunt"	1987	
"Retirement Plan"	1988	
"Second Time Round"	1989	
"There For the Picking"	1990	
"All for Love"	1991	

==== Call the Midwife ====
Episode	Year	Description
"Christmas Special"	2012	Set in 1957.
"Christmas Special"	2013	Set in 1958.
"Christmas Special"	2014	Set in 1959.
"Christmas Special"	2015	Set in 1960.
"Christmas Special"	2016	Set in 1961.
"Christmas Special"	2017	Set in 1962.
"Christmas Special"	2018	Set in 1963.
"Christmas Special"	2019	Set in 1964.
"Christmas Special"	2020	Set in 1965.
"Christmas Special"	2021	Set in 1966.
"Christmas Special"	2022	Set in 1967.
"Christmas Special"	2023	Set in 1968.
2024	Set in 1969 (2 parter).	
2025	Set in 1970 (2 parter).	

==== Casualty / Holby City ====
Series	Episode	Year	Description
Casualty	Survival	1986	
Casualty	Closure	1986	
Casualty	These Things Happen	1987	
Casualty	Silent Night	1992	
Casualty	Comfort and Joy	1993	
Casualty	Talking Turkey	1994	
Casualty	Lost Boys	1995	
Casualty	Do You Believe in Fairies?	1996	
Casualty	The Golden Hour	1997	
Casualty	New Year and All That	1998	
Casualty	Peace on Earth	1999	
Holby City	Tidings of Comfort and Joy	1999	
Casualty	Merry Christmas Dr Spiller	2000	
Holby City	A Christmas Carol, Part I	2000	
Holby City	A Christmas Carol, Part II	2000	
Casualty	Life and Soul	2001	
Holby City	'Twas the Night	2001	
Casualty	Some Comfort, No Joy, Little Peace, Bit Too Much Love	2002	
Holby City	Sinners And Saints	2002	
Casualty	Eat, Drink and Be Merry	2003	
Holby City	In The Bleak Midwinter	2003	
Casualty@Holby City	Casualty@Holby City at Christmas (Part One)	2004	
Casualty@Holby City	Casualty@Holby City at Christmas (Part Two)	2004	
Casualty	Do They Know It's Christmas?	2005	
Casualty@Holby City	Deny Thy Father (Part 1)	2005	
Casualty@Holby City	Deny Thy Father (Part 2)	2005	
Casualty	Silent Night	2006	
Holby City	The Good Fight	2006	
Casualty	What's So Funny 'Bout Peace, Love and Understanding	2007	
Holby City	Elliot's Wonderful Life	2007	
Casualty	This Will Be Our Year	2008	
Casualty	Took a Long Time to Come	2008	
Holby City	Maria's Christmas Carol	2008	
Casualty	All I Want for Christmas	2009	
Casualty	Tidings of Comfort and Joy	2009	
Holby City	Stand By Me	2009	
Casualty	Season of Goodwill	2010	
Casualty	Winter Wonderland	2010	
Holby City	The Most Wonderful Time of the Year	2010	
Casualty	Next of Kin	2011	
Holby City	Wise Men	2011	
Casualty	I Saw Mommy Killing Santa Claus	2012	
Holby City	Through the Darkness	2012	
Holby City	And We Banish Shade	2012	
Casualty	Away in a Manger	2013	
Holby City	All I Want for Christmas Is You	2013	
Casualty	Solomon's Song	2014	
Holby City	Star of Wonder	2014	
Holby City	I Will Honour Christmas in My Heart	2014	
Casualty	Maybe This Year	2015	
Casualty	Home for Christmas	2015	
Holby City	Bad Blood, Fake Snow	2015	
Holby City	Blue Christmas	2015	
Casualty	All I Want for Christmas Is You	2016	
Casualty	Bah Humbug	2016	
Holby City	Hallelujah	2016	
Holby City	The Nightmare Before Christmas	2016	
Casualty	Series 32, episode 17	2017	
Holby City	Best Christmas Ever	2018	
Casualty	Series 33, episode 17	2018	

==== Doctor Who ====
Episode/special	Year	Description
"The Feast of Steven"	1965	Episode 7 of The Daleks' Master Plan
"The Christmas Invasion"	2005	
"The Runaway Bride"	2006	
"Voyage of the Damned"	2007	
"The Next Doctor"	2008	
"The End of Time: Part One"	2009	
"A Christmas Carol"	2010	
"The Doctor, the Widow and the Wardrobe"	2011	
"The Snowmen"	2012	
"The Time of the Doctor"	2013	
"Last Christmas"	2014	
"The Husbands of River Song"	2015	
"The Return of Doctor Mysterio"	2016	
"Twice Upon a Time"	2017	
"The Church on Ruby Road"	2023	
"Joy to the World"	2024	

==== Father Brown ====
Episode	Year	Description
"The Star of Jacob"	2016	
"The Tree of Truth"	2017	

==== Grange Hill ====
Special	Year	Description
Christmas Special	1981	
Christmas Special	1985	

==== Jonathan Creek ====
Episode	Year	Description
Black Canary	1998	
Satan's Chimney	2001	
The Grinning Man	2009	
Daemons' Roost	2016	

=== ITV ===
Series/special	Episode	Year	Description
The Adventures of Robin Hood	The Christmas Goose	1957	
The Adventures of Sherlock Holmes	The Blue Carbuncle	1984	
The Avengers	Too Many Christmas Trees	1965	
Agatha Christie's Poirot	Hercule Poirot's Christmas	1995	
Cadfael	The Virgin in the Ice	1995	
A Christmas Carol		2000	
The Bretts	Grand Finale	1987	
Fast Freddie, The Widow and Me		2011	
Doctor Finlay	Snowblind	1996	
Drummonds	A Woman Lost and Found	1985	
El C.I.D.	Christmas Spirit	1991	
The Flame Trees of Thika	Happy New Year	1981	
Foyle's War	Bleak Midwinter	2007	
London's Burning	Ding Dong Merrily	1988	
Shine on Harvey Moon	A Christmas Truce	1982	
Minder	Minder's Christmas Bonus	1983	
Orson Welles' Great Mysteries	Complements of the Season	1973	
Public Eye	Horse and Carriage	1972	
Rumpole of the Bailey	Rumpole and the Case of Identity	1979	
Tales of the Unexpected	The Party	1980	

==== A Family at War ====
Episode	Year	Description
The Other Side of the Hill	1970	
Yielding Place to New	1972	

==== Armchair Theatre ====
Episode	Year	Description
Ring Out the Old	1956	Season 1, Episode 15
Roast Goose and Walnut Stuffing	1959	Season 4, Episode 14
Hear the Tiger, See the Bay	1962	Series 7, Episode 6

==== Bad Girls ====
Special	Year	Description
Christmas Special	2005	
Christmas Special	2006	

==== Boon ====
Episode	Year(s)	Description
Full Circle	1986	
The Tender Trap	1990	
The Night Before Christmas	1991	

==== The Bill ====
Episode	Year	Description
Stuffed	1994	
Merrily on High	1996	
Twanky	1997	
Christmas Star	1998	
When the Snow Lay Round About	1999	
The Night Before	2000	
Santa's Little Helper	2008	

==== The Darling Buds of May ====
Episode	Year	Description
Christmas Is Coming	1991	Season 1, Episode 7
Le Grand Weekend	1992	Season 2, Episode 7

==== Downton Abbey ====
Episode/special	Year	Description
Christmas at Downton Abbey	2011	Season 2, Episode 9
A Journey to the Highlands	2012	Season 3, Episode 9
The London Season	2013	Season 4, Episode 9
A Moorland Holiday	2014	Season 5, Episode 9
The Finale	2015	Season 6, Episode 9

==== Heartbeat / The Royal ====
Series	Episode/special	Year	Description
Heartbeat	A Winter's Tale	1994	
Heartbeat	Charity Begins at Home	1996	
Heartbeat	The Queen's Message	1997	
Heartbeat	Echoes of the Past	1998	
Heartbeat	Cold Turkey	2000	
Heartbeat	No Hiding Place	2001	
Heartbeat	Many Splendoured Thing	2002	
The Royal	Famous for a Day	2003	
Heartbeat	In the Bleak Midwinter	2004	
Heartbeat	Christmas Album	2005	
Heartbeat	Auld Acquaintance	2005	

==== Midsomer Murders ====
Episode	Year	Description
Ghosts of Christmas Past	2004	
Days of Misrule	2008	
The Christmas Haunting	2013	

==== Northern Lights ====
Episode	Year	Description
Christmas Lights	2004	
Clash of the Santas	2008	

==== Taggart ====
Episode	Year	Description
Cold Blood	1987	
Double Jeopardy	1988	
Rouges' Gallery	1990	

==== Upstairs, Downstairs ====
Episode	Year	Description
Whom God Hath Joined	1972	
Goodwill to All Men	1973	

=== Channel 4 ===
Series	Episode	Year	Description
The Max Headroom Show	Max Headroom's Giant Christmas Turkey	1986	
Shameless	Christmas Special	2004	
Black Mirror	White Christmas	2014	

=== Channel 5 ===
==== All Creatures Great and Small ====
Episode/special	Year	Description
The Night Before Christmas	2020	
The Perfect Christmas	2021	
Merry Bloody Christmas	2022	
On a Wing and a Prayer	2023	
All God's Creatures	2024	

==== The Madame Blanc Mysteries ====
Episode/special	Year	Description
Christmas in Sainte Victoire	2022	
Christmas Special	2023	
Christmas Special	2024	

==== Sunny Bunnies ====
Episode/special	Year	Description
Christmas Tree	2015	
Let's Go Get Those Presents	2017	
Jingle Bell Bunnies	2018	
Christmas Stocking	2019	
Cosmic Christmas Tree	2021	

== Comedies ==
=== BBC ===
Series/special	Episode(s)/(Special(s))	Year(s)	Description
A Bit of Fry & Laurie	Christmas Special	1987	
AD/BC: A Rock Opera		2004	
The All New Alexei Sayle Show	Alexei's Extra Special Xmas Show	1994	
Amandaland	Christmas Special	2025	
Bernard and the Genie		1991	
Bad Education	Christmas	2013	
Blackadder	Blackadder's Christmas Carol	1988	
The Bleak Old Shop of Stuff	Christmas Special	2011	
Bluestone 42	Christmas Special	2013	
Boomers	Christmas Special	2015	
Bottom	Holy	1992	
Butterflies	Christmas with the Parkinsons	1979	
The Charlie Drake Show	A Christmas Carol	1960	Lost
Chef!	A Bird in the Hand	1993	
Christmas Night with the Stars		1958–72, 1994, 2003	Anthology special featuring mini-episodes of several BBC programs.
The Cleaner	A Clean Christmas	2022	
The Comic Strip	Wild Turkey	1992	
Cuckoo	Christmas Special	2014	
Dad	Nemesis	1999	
The Dawson Watch	Christmas Special	1980	
Dead Ringers	Christmas Specials	2003-2005	
Dear John	Kate Returns	1987	
Detectorists	Christmas Special	2015, 2022	
Extras	Christmas Special	2007	
The Fast Show	Christmas Special	1996	
French and Saunders	Christmas Specials	1988, 1994, 1998-2003	
The Frost Report	Frost Over Christmas	1967	
The Funny Side of Christmas		1982	Anthology special including mini-episodes of several BBC programs including: The Fall and Rise of Reginald Perrin; Butterflies; Only Fools and Horses; Last of the Summer Wine; Sorry!; Three of a Kind; Smith and Jones; Open All Hours; The Les Dawson Show; Yes Minister
Gavin & Stacey	Christmas Special	2008, 2019, 2024	
Gimmie Gimmie Gimmie	Millennium	1999	
The Goes Wrong Show	The Nativity	2020	
The Good Life	Silly, But It's Fun	1977	
The Goodies	Earthanasia	1977	
Hebburn	Christmas Special	2013	
Here We Go	Mum's Classic Family Christmas	2023	
Him & Her	The Christmas Special	2012	
House of Fools	The Bobble Hat Affair	2014	
Ideal	An Ideal Xmas	2005	
It Ain't Half Hot Mum	Puddings from Heaven	1977	
Jam & Jerusalem	Christmas Panto	2006	
Just Good Friends	Christmas Special	1984	
Kiss Me Kate	Christmas	2000	
Knowing Me, Knowing You... with Alan Partridge	Knowing Me, Knowing Yule	1995	
Lead Balloon	Nuts	2008	
The League of Gentlemen	Yule Never Leave!	2000	
May to December	I'll See You in My Dreams	1990	
Men Behaving Badly	Jingle Balls	1997	
My Hero	Christmas	2000	
Next of Kin	The Nativity Play	1995	
No Place Like Home	A Crabtree Christmas	1984	
The Office	Christmas specials	2003	
Operation Good Guys	That's Entertainment	2000	
Rev.	Christmas Special	2011	
Russell Howard's Good News	Christmas Special	2009	
The Smoking Room	Christmas Special	2004	
Sorry!	Winter's Tales	1988	
The Thin Blue Line	Yuletide Spirit	1995	
Two Pints of Lager and a Packet of Crisps	When Janet Met Jonny	2003	
Whatever Happened to the Likely Lads?	Christmas Special	1974	
The Worst Week of My Life	The Worst Christmas of My Life	2006	
Yes Minister	Party Games	1984	

==== 2point4 Children ====
Episode	Year(s)	Description
Misery	1992	
Babes in the Wood	1993	
Relax-ay-voo	1994	
Porky's	1995	
Two Years Before the Mast	1996	

==== Absolutely Fabulous ====
Episode/special	Year(s)	Description
Happy New Year	1995	
Gay	2002	
Cold Turkey	2003	
White Box	2004	
Identity	2011	
Job	2012	

==== After You've Gone ====
Episode	Year(s)	Description
And So This Is Christmas	2007	
There Will Be Pud	2008	

==== Alas Smith and Jones ====
Episode	Year(s)	Description
The Home-Made Xmas Video	1987	
Alas Sage & Onion	1988	

==== 'Allo 'Allo! ====
Episode	Year(s)	Description
The Gateau from the Chateau	1985	
A Bun in the Oven	1991	

==== Are You Being Served? ====
Episode	Year(s)	Description
Christmas Crackers	1975	
The Father Christmas Affair	1976	
Happy Returns	1978	
The Punch and Judy Affair	1979	
Roots?	1981	

==== Birds of a Feather ====
Episode	Year(s)	Description
Sailing	1989	
Falling in Love Again	1990	
We'll Always Have Majorca	1991	
The Chigwell Connection	1992	
It Happened in Hollywood	1993	
Christmas in Dreamland	1994	
Reservoir Birds	1997	
Holy Ground	1998	

==== Bread ====
Episode	Year(s)	Description
Christmas with the Boswells	1988	
A Quiet Christmas	1989	
Another Christmas with the Boswells	1990	

==== The Brittas Empire ====
Episode	Year(s)	Description
In the Beginning	1994	
Surviving Christmas	1996	

==== The Catherine Tate Show ====
Series	Episode	Year(s)	Description
The Catherine Tate Show	Christmas Special	2005	
Nans Christmas Carol		2009	
Catherine Tate's Nan		2013	

==== Citizen Khan ====
Episode	Year(s)	Description
A Khan Christmas	2013	
A Khan Family Christmas	2014	
Mr Khan's Christmas Wonderland	2015	
It's a Khanderful Life	2016	

==== Citizen Smith ====
Episode	Year(s)	Description
A Story for Christmas	1977	
Buon Natale	1980	

==== Dad's Army ====
Episode	Year(s)	Description
Santa on Patrol	1968	Lost
Resisting the Aggressor Down the Ages	1969	
The Cornish Floral Dance	1970	Lost
Battle of the Giants!	1971	
Broadcast to the Empire	1972	
Turkey Dinner	1974	
My Brother and I	1975	
The Love Of Three Oranges	1976	

==== The Detectives ====
Episode	Year(s)	Description
Thicker Than Water	1995	
Go West, Old Man	1997	

==== Dinnerladies ====
Episode	Year(s)	Description
Party	1998	
Gamble	1999	
Christmas	1999	

==== Ever Decreasing Circles ====
Episode/special	Year(s)	Description
The Party	1984	
Moving On	1989	

==== Goodnight Sweetheart ====
Episode	Year(s)	Description
Between the Devil and the Deep Blue Sea	1995	
Just in Time	1999	

==== Ghosts ====
Episode	Year(s)	Description
The Ghost of Christmas	2020	
He Came!	2021	
It's Behind You	2022	
A Christmas Gift	2023	

==== Happy Ever After / Terry and June ====
Series	Episode	Year(s)	Description
Happy Ever After	Christmas	1976	
Happy Ever After	June's Parents	1977	
Terry and June	The Christmas Show (The Mink Coat)	1980	
Terry and June	Festive Doldums	1981	
Terry and June	Christmas with Terry and June	1982	
Terry and June	Pantomania	1985	

==== Hancock's Half Hour ====
Episode/special	Year(s)	Description
Hancock's 43 Minutes – The East Cheam Repertory Company	1957	
Ericson the Viking	1958	

==== Harry Enfield's Television Program/ Harry Enfield & Chums ====
Series	Episode/specials	Year(s)	Description
The Harry Enfield Television Program	Harry Enfield's Festive Television Program	1992	
Harry Enfield & Chums	Harry Enfield and Christmas Chums	1997	
Harry Enfield & Chums	Harry Enfield's Yule Log Chums	1998	

==== Insert Name Here ====
Episode	Year(s)	Guest panelists
Christmas	2016	Deborah Meaden, Kate Williams, Danny Baker & Sara Pascoe.
Christmas	2017	Jack Dee, Suzannah Lipscomb, Liz Bonnin & Martin Kemp.
Xmas	2018	Suzannah Lipscomb, Chris Packham, James Acaster & Carol Vorderman.

==== Inside No. 9 ====
Episode	Year(s)	Description
The Devil of Christmas	2016	
Love's Great Adventure	2020	
The Bones of St. Nicholas	2022	

==== Keeping Up Appearances ====
Episode	Year(s)	Description
The Father Christmas Suit	1991	
Sea Fever	1993	
Angel Gabriel Blue	1994	
The Pageant	1995	

==== Last of the Summer Wine ====
Episode	Year(s)	Description
Small Tune on a Penny Wassail	1978	
And a Dewhurst Up a Fir Tree	1979	
Whoops	1981	
All Mod Conned	1982	
Getting Sam Home	1983	
The Loxley Lozenge	1984	
Uncle of the Bride	1986	
Merry Christmas, Father Christmas	1986	
Big Day at Dream Acres	1987	
Crums	1988	
What's Santa Brought for Nora Then?	1989	
Barry's Christmas	1990	
Situations Vacant	1991	
Stop That Castle!	1992	
Welcome to Earth	1993	
The Man Who Nearly Knew Pavarotti	1995	
A Leg Up for Christmas	1995	
Extra! Extra!	1996	
There Goes the Groom	1997	
Last Post and Pigeon	2000	
Potts in Pole Position	2001	
A Musical Passing for a Miserable Muscroft	2002	
A Short Blast of Fred Astaire	2003	
Variations on a Theme of the Widow Winstanley	2004	
Merry Entwistle and Jackson Day	2005	
A Tale of Two Sweaters	2006	
I Was a Hitman for Primrose Dairies	2008	

==== Live at the Apollo ====
Episode	Year(s)	Comedians
Noel at the Apollo	2015	Nina Conti (host), Tanyalee Davis, Hal Cruttenden & Josh Widdicombe
Noel at the Apollo	2016	Romesh Ranganathan (host), Seann Walsh, Kerry Godliman & Spencer Jones
Noel at the Apollo	2017	Katherine Ryan (host), Joel Dommett, Marlon Davis & John Robins

==== Man vs. Baby ====
Episode	Year(s)	Description
	2025	

==== Mandy ====
Episode	Year(s)	Description
We Wish You a Mandy Christmas	2021	
The Mandy Who Knew Too Much	2026	

==== Meet the Wife ====
Episode	Year(s)	Description
Journey Home	1965	
Christmas Travel	1966	Lost

==== Miranda ====
Episode	Year(s)	Description
The Perfect Christmas	2010	
It Was Panning	2012	

==== Mock the Week ====
Episode	Year(s)	Description
Christmas Special	2008	Series compilation
Christmas Special	2009	Series compilation
Christmas Special	2010	Series compilation
Christmas Special	2011	Series compilation
Christmas Special	2012	Series compilation
Christmas Special	2013	Series compilation
Christmas Special	2014	Series compilation
Christmas Special	2015	Series compilation
Christmas Special	2016	Series compilation
Christmas Special	2017	Series compilation

==== The Morecambe and Wise Show ====
Special	Year(s)	Description
Christmas Special	1969	
Christmas Special	1970	
Christmas Special	1971	
Christmas Special	1972	
Christmas Special	1973	
Christmas Special	1975	
Christmas Special	1976	
Christmas Special	1977	

==== Motherland ====
Episode	Year(s)	Description
Christmas Special	2020	
Last Christmas	2022	

==== Mrs. Brown's Boys ====
Episode	Year(s)	Description
Mammy's Ass	2011	
Mammy Christmas / The Virgin Mammy	2012	
Buckin' Mammy / Who's a Pretty Mammy?	2013	
Mammy's Tickled Pink / Mammy's Gamble	2014	
Mammy's Christmas Punch / Mammy's Widow Memories	2015	
Mammy's Forest / Chez Mammy	2016	
Mammy's Mummy / CSI: Mammy	2017	
Exotic Mammy / Mammy's Hotel	2018	
A Wonderful Mammy / Orange Is The New Mammy	2019	
Mammy of the People / Mammy's Memories	2020	
Mammy's Mechanical Merriment / Mammy's Mickey	2021	
Shining Mammy / Mammy's Hair Loom	2022	

==== My Family ====
Episode/special	Year(s)	Description
Ding Dong Merrily	2002	
Sixty Feet Under	2003	
Glad Tidings We Bring	2004	
... And I'll Cry If I Want To	2005	
The Heart of Christmas	2006	
Ho Ho No	2007	
Have An Unhappy Christmas	2008	
2039: A Christmas Oddity	2009	
Mary Christmas	2010	

==== Not Going Out ====
Episode/special	Year(s)	Description
Murder at Christmas	2007	
Absent Father Christmas	2009	
The House	2013	
The Wedding	2014	
Christmas Shopping	2015	
The True Meaning of Christmas	2017	
Ding Dong Merrily On Live	2018	
Driving Home for Christmas	2019	
Panto	2021	
Wilfred	2023	

==== One Foot in the Grave ====
Episode/special	Year(s)	Description
Who's Listening?	1990	
The Man In The Long Black Coat	1991	
One Foot in the Algarve	1993	
The Man Who Blew Away	1994	
The Wisdom of the Witch	1995	
Starbound	1996	
Endgame	1997	

==== Only Fools and Horses / The Green Green Grass / Rock & Chips ====
Series	Episode/specials	Year(s)	Description
Only Fools and Horses	Christmas Crackers	1981	
Only Fools and Horses	Christmas Trees	1982	Part of The Funny Side of Christmas
Only Fools and Horses	Diamonds Are for Heather	1982	
Only Fools and Horses	Thicker Than Water	1983	
Only Fools and Horses	To Hull and Back	1985	
Only Fools and Horses	A Royal Flush	1986	
Only Fools and Horses	The Frog's Legacy	1987	
Only Fools and Horses	Dates	1988	
Only Fools and Horses	The Jolly Boys' Outing	1989	
Only Fools and Horses	Rodney Come Home	1990	
Only Fools and Horses	Miami Twice: Part 1 – The American Dream / Miami Twice: Part 2 – Oh to Be in England	1991	
Only Fools and Horses	Mother Nature's Son	1992	
Only Fools and Horses	Fatal Extraction	1993	
Only Fools and Horses	Heroes and Villains / Modern Men / Time On Our Hands	1996	The Christmas Trilogy
Only Fools and Horses	If They Could See Us Now	2001	
Only Fools and Horses	Strangers on the Shore	2002	
Only Fools and Horses	Sleepless in Peckham	2003	
The Green Green Grass	One Flew Over the Cuckoo Clock	2005	
The Green Green Grass	From Here to Paternity	2006	
The Green Green Grass	The Special Relationship	2007	
Rock & Chips	Five Gold Rings	2010	

==== Open All Hours / Still Open All Hours ====
Series	Episode	Year(s)	Description
Open All Hours	Untitled short subject	1982	
Still Open All Hours	Pilot	2013	
Still Open All Hours	Christmas Special	2014	
Still Open All Hours	Christmas Special	2015	
Still Open All Hours	Christmas Special	2016	
Still Open All Hours	Christmas Special	2017	
Still Open All Hours	Christmas Special	2018	
Still Open All Hours	Christmas Special	2019	

==== Outnumbered ====
Episode	Year(s)	Description
The Robbers	2009	
The Broken Santa	2011	
The Sick Party	2012	
Christmas Special 2016	2016	

==== Porridge ====
Episode	Year(s)	Description
No Way Out	1975	
The Desperate Hours	1976	

==== QI ====
Episode	Year(s)	Description
Advent	2003	
Birth	2004	
December	2006	
Empire	2007	
Elephants	2007	
Fire and Freezing	2008	
Groovy	2009	
Hocus Pocus	2010	
Icy	2011	
Jingle Bells	2012	
Kris Kringle	2013	
No-L	2014	
Merriment	2015	
Noel	2016	
O Christmas	2017	
Pubs	2018	
Quizmas	2019	
Rejoice! A Christmas Special	2020	
Season Greeting	2021	
Toys, Tinsel and Turkeys	2022	

==== Rab C. Nesbitt ====
Episode	Year(s)	Description
Seasonal Greet	1988	
Home	1992	
Clean	2008	
Hoodie	2014	

==== The Royle Family ====
Episode	Year(s)	Description
Christmas with the Royle Family	1999	
The Royle Family at Christmas	2000	
The New Sofa	2008	
The Golden Egg Cup	2009	
Joe's Crackers	2010	
Barbara's Old Ring	2012	

==== Some Mothers Do 'Ave 'Em ====
Episode	Year(s)	Description
Jessica's First Christmas	1974	
Learning to Drive	1975	
Learning to Fly	1978	

==== Starstruck ====
Episode	Year(s)	Description
Christmas	2021	
Christmas, Again	2022	

==== Steptoe and Son ====
Episode	Year(s)	Description
The Party	1973	
A Perfect Christmas	1974	

==== Still Game ====
Series	Episode	Year(s)	Description
Christmas Special	Cold Turkey	2005	
Hogmanay Special	The Party	2006	
Christmas Special	Plum Number	2007	
Hogmanay Special	Hootenanny	2007	

==== Sykes ====
Episode	Year(s)	Description
Christmas Party	1975	
Sykes at Christmas	1977	

==== Till Death Us Do Part / In Sickness and in Health ====
Series	Episode	Year(s)	Description
Till Death Us Do Part	Peace and Goodwill	1966	
Till Death Us Do Part	Christmas Special	1972	
In Sickness and in Health	Christmas Special	1985	
In Sickness and in Health	Christmas Special	1986	
In Sickness and in Health	Christmas Special	1987	
In Sickness and in Health	Christmas Special	1989	
In Sickness and in Health	Christmas Special	1990	

==== To the Manor Born ====
Episode	Year(s)	Description
Christmas Special	1979	
Christmas Special	2007	

==== The Two Ronnies ====
Series/special	Episode/special	Year(s)	Description
The Two Ronnies	Old-Fashioned Christmas Mystery	1973	
The Two Ronnies	Christmas Special	1980	
The Two Ronnies	Christmas Special	1981	
The Two Ronnies	Christmas Special	1982	
The Two Ronnies	Christmas Special	1984	
Christmas with the Ronnies		1985	
The Two Ronnies: Christmas Special		1987	
The Two Ronnies Sketchbook	The Christmas Sketchbook	2005	

==== The Vicar of Dibley ====
Episode	Year(s)	Description
The Christmas Lunch Incident	1996	
Winter	1999	
Merry Christmas	2004	
The Handsome Stranger / The Vicar in White	2006	

==== Upstart Crow ====
Episode	Year(s)	Description
A Christmassy Crow	2017	
A Crow Christmas Carol	2018	
Tomorrow and Tomorrow and Tomorrow: Lockdown Christmas 1603	2020	

==== Victoria Wood ====
Series	Year(s)	Description
Victoria Wood with All The Trimmings	2000	
Victoria Wood's Mid-Life Christmas	2009	

==== Waiting for God ====
Episode	Year(s)	Description
Christmas at Bayview	1992	
Another Christmas at Bayview	1993	

==== Would I Lie to You? ====
Episode	Year(s)	Guest panelists
Christmas Special	2013	Miranda Hart, Stephen Mangan, Barry Cryer & Miles Jupp
Christmas Special	2014	Josh Widdicombe, Ray Winstone, Rachel Riley & Ricky Tomlinson
Christmas Special	2015	Bill Bailey, Ruth Jones, Jo Brand & Kelly Holmes
Christmas Special	2016	Tom Courtenay, Richard Osman, Chris Kamara & Sara Pascoe
Christmas Special	2017	Henry Blofeld, Richard Coles, Kerry Howard & Clive Myrie
Christmas Special	2018	Lily Allen, Noddy Holder, James Acaster & Sian Gibson
Christmas Special	2019	Liz Bonnin, Stephen Merchant, Sharon Osbourne & Ranj Singh
Christmas Special	2020	Joe Lycett, Ruth Madeley, Jo Brand & Joe Swash
Christmas Special	2021	Jim Broadbent, Rose Matafeo, Ardal O'Hanlon & Angela Rippon
Christmas Special	2022	Gloria Hunniford, Guz Khan, Christopher Eccleston & Sophie Willan
Christmas Special	2023	Victoria Coren Mitchell, Naga Munchetty, Alex Brooker & Melvyn Hayes
Christmas Special	2024	Jimmy Carr, Laura Smyth, Rustie Lee & Lenny Rush
Christmas Special	2025	Jools Holland, Swarzy Shire, Helen George, David Walliams

=== ITV ===
Series/special	Episode(s)/(special(s))	Year(s)	Description
A Bit of a Do	The Angling Club Christmas Party	1989	
The Adventures of Aggie	High Ho Silver	1956	
Agony	Rings Off Their Fingers	1981	
All-Star Comedy Carnival		1969–73	Anthology special featuring mini-episodes of several ITV programs.
All This and Christmas Too		1971	TV play starring Sid James and Kenneth Connor.
Babes in the Wood	New Year's Eve	1998	
Bad Move	Festive Cheer	2018	
Barbara	Neighbours	2003	
Benidorm	Christmas Special	2010	
Billy Liar	Billy and the Gift of the Magi	1973	
Bless Me Father	The Season Of Good Will	1979	
Bobby in Wonderland		1988	
Doc Martin	Last Christmas in Portwenn	2022	
Doctor in Charge	Should Auld Acquaintance Be Forgot?	1973	
The Dustbinmen	Christmas Special	1969	
Duty Free	A Duty Free Christmas	1986	
The Flint Street Nativity		1999	
For the Love of Ada	Christmas with Ada	1971	
The Fosters	New Year with the Fosters	1977	
George and the Dragon	Merry Christmas	1966	
Get Some In!	Christmas at the Camp	1975	
The Goodies	Snow White 2	1981	
Hallelujah!	A Goose for Mrs Scratchitt	1984	
Home to Roost	Family Ties	1987	
In Loving Memory	God Rest Ye Merry Gentlemen	1982	
Love Thy Neighbour	Christmas Spirit	1975	
Mr. Bean	Merry Christmas, Mr. Bean	1992	
My Husband and I	No Place Like Home	1987	
Never Mind the Quality, Feel the Width	I'm Dreaming of a Kosher Christmas	1968	
Never the Twain	A Winter's Tale	1989	
Oh No, It's Selwyn Froggitt!	On the Feast of Selwyn	1977	
Only When I Laugh	Away for Christmas	1981	
Outside Edge	Corfu - OK? Fair Enough	1995	
The Rag Trade	The Christmas Rush	1977	
Rising Damp	For the Man Who Has Everything	1975	
Rainbow (TV series)	Christmas Music	1972-1975	
Spitting Image	A Non-Denominational Spitting Image Holiday Special	1987	
Stanley Baxter's Christmas Box		1976	
The Two of Us	Christmas Special	1988	
Two's Company	A Loving Christmas	1976	
The Upper Hand	Requiem	1990	
Vicious	Christmas Special	2013	

==== After Henry ====
Special	Year(s)	Description
A Quiet Christmas	1988	
A Week of Sundays	1989	

==== The Army Game ====
Episode	Year(s)	Description
Ebeneezer Scrooge	1958	Lost
Miracle in Hut 29	1959	
Happy New Year	1960	
Private Cinders	1960	

==== The Cannon and Ball Show ====
Episode	Year(s)	Description
Christmas Special	1980	
Christmas Special	1985	
Christmas Special	1986	
Christmas Special	1988	

==== Carry On ====
Series/special	Episode(s)/(special(s))	Year(s)	Description
Carry on Christmas		1969	
Carry on Again Christmas		1970	
Carry on Christmas	Carry on Stuffing	1972	
Carry on Christmas		1973	
Carry on Laughing's Christmas Classics		1983	

==== Birds of a Feather ====
(originally aired on BBC One from 1989 to 1998)

Episode/special	Year(s)	Description
Birds on a Plane	2014	
There's a Girl in My Souk	2016	
The House for the Rising Sons	2017	
We Gotta Get Out of This Place	2020	

==== Creature Comforts ====
Episode/special	Year(s)	Description
Merry Christmas	2003	
Merry Christmas Everybody!	2005	

==== The Dame Edna Experience / Dame Edna's Hollywood ====
Series	Episode(s)/(Special(s))	Year(s)	Description
The Dame Edna Experience	The Dame Edna Christmas Experience	1987	
The Dame Edna Experience	The Dame Edna Satellite Experience	1989	
Dame Edna's Hollywood	Dame Edna's Hollywood Christmas	1994	

==== Fresh Fields / French Fields ====
Series	Episode(s)/(Special(s))	Year(s)	Description
Fresh Fields	A Dickens of a Christmas	1985	
French Fields	Noel, Noel	1990	

==== George and Mildred ====
Episode(s)/(Special(s))	Year(s)	Description
No Business Like Show Business	1977	
On the Second Day of Christmas	1978	
The Twenty Six Year Itch	1979	

==== The Larkins ====
Episode(s)/(Special(s))	Year(s)	Description
Christmas with the Larkins	1958	
Strained Relation	1963	

==== The Morecambe and Wise Show ====
Specials	Year(s)	Description
Christmas Special	1978	
Christmas Special	1979	
Christmas Special	1980	
Christmas Special	1981	
Christmas Special	1982	
Christmas Special	1983	

==== Nearest and Dearest ====
Episode(s)/(Special(s))	Year(s)	Description
The Ghost Of Picklers Past	1969	
Compliments of the Season	1970	
Cindernellie/ All Star Comedy Carnival	1972	

==== On the Buses ====
Episode(s)/(Special(s))	Year(s)	Description
Christmas Duty	1970	
Boxing Day Social	1971	

==== Please Sir! ====
Episode(s)/(Special(s))	Year(s)	Description
It's the Thought that Counts	1968	
And Everyone Came Too	1970	

==== Robin's Nest ====
Episode(s)/(Special(s))	Year(s)	Description
Christmas at Robin's Nest	1979	
No Room at the Inn	1980	

==== Shelley ====
Episode(s)/(Special(s))	Year(s)	Description
Christmas with Shelley	1980	
Cold Turkey	1989	

==== That's My Boy ====
Episode(s)/(Special(s))	Year(s)	Description
Cold Turkey	1983	
Little Donkey	1984	

==== Watching ====
Episode(s)/(Special(s))	Year(s)	Description
Seasoning	1987	
Twitching	1988	
Presenting	1991	
Slipping	1991	
Reverting	1993	

==== Yanks Go Home ====
Episode(s)/(Special(s))	Year(s)	Description
Some of Our Coal Is Missing	1977	Was aired in September

==== You're Only Young Twice ====
Episode(s)/(Special(s))	Year(s)	Description
Christmas at Paradise Lodge	1979	
Twas the Night Before Christmas	1980	

=== Channel 4 ===
Series/special	Episode(s)/(special(s))	Year(s)	Description
Bob and Margaret	A Very Fishy Christmas	2001	
Big Boys	Merry Sexmas	2022	
Desmond's	O Little Town of Peckham	1994	
Drop the Dead Donkey	Xmas Party	1991	
Eurotrash	Xmas Specials	1994-1999	
Father's Day	Guess Who's Coming to Christmas Dinner?	1983	
Father Ted	A Christmassy Ted	1996	
Friday Night Dinner	Christmas Special	2012	
The Inbetweeners	Xmas Party	2008	
Misfits	Christmas Special	2010	
Nightingales	Silent Night	1992	
Peep Show	Seasonal Beatings	2010	
Teachers	Christmas Special	2004	
Trigger Happy TV	Christmas Specials	2003	
The Windsors	Christmas Special	2016	
Whose Line Is It Anyway?	Christmas Edition	1989	

==== Bo Selecta ====
Episode(s)/(Special(s))	Year(s)	Description
Ho, Ho, Ho Selecta!	2003	
A Bear's Christmas Tail	2004	

==== Man Down ====
Episode(s)/(Special(s))	Year(s)	Description
Christmas Special	2013	
Finding Nesta	2014	

=== Other channels ===
Series/special	Episode(s)/(special(s))	Year(s)	Description
Time Gentlemen Please	Bar Humbug, It's a Wonderful Pint	2000, 2001	
Stella	Christmas in Pontyberry, Holly	2014, 2016	

== Christmas television plays ==
From the mid-1950s until the mid-1980s, the British Christmas television play was a popular television programming genre:

Series/special	Episode(s)/(special(s))	Year(s)	Description
ITV Playhouse	The Christmas Card - Series 5 Episode 16	1959	
The Wednesday Play	The Coming Out Party - Series 1 Episode 3	1965	Directed by Ken Loach
Play for Today	Edward G – Like the Filmstar - Series 3 Episode 25	1973	
Play for Today	The Saturday Party - Series 5 Episode 17	1975	
Black Christmas		1977	Written by Michael Abbensetts
Wodehouse Playhouse	Big Business - Series 3 Episode 6	1978	
Season's Greetings		1986	Written by Alan Ayckbourn
Day To Remember		1986	Written by Jack Rosenthal

== General entertainment shows ==
Series/special	Episode(s)/(special(s))	Description
The Gadget Show	Christmas Special	2006–present
The Hotel	Christmas at the Grosvenor	2012
The One Show	Holidays Special	2009–present

=== Cookery Shows ===
Series/special	Episode(s)/(special(s))	Years(s)	Description
Delia Smith's Christmas	6 episodes	1990	
The Great British Bake Off	Christmas Special	2012–2016	
The Great Christmas Bake Off		2017–present	
The Hairy Bikers	Christmas Special	2008–2023	
Lets do Christmas with Gino & Mel		2011–2014	
Nigella's Christmas Kitchen		2007	
Tom Kerridge Cooks Christmas		2013	

=== Music/Dancing ===
Series/special	Episode(s)/(special(s))	Year(s)	Description
Chas & Dave's Knees Up	Chas & Dave's Christmas Knees Up	1982	
Cheggers Play Pop	Christmas Specials	1981-1983	
Dancing on Ice at Christmas		2008	
Strictly Come Dancing	Christmas Specials	2004–present	
Supersonic Christmas Show Special		1975, 1976 & 1983	A Mike Mansfield production
Top of the Pops	Christmas Specials	1964–present	There has been a Christmas edition of Top of the Pops every year since 1964 and even past the show's cancellation, showing the hits of the current year (sometimes shown in a New Years Special) and a countdown to the Christmas number one single.

=== Gameshows ===
Series/special	Episode(s)/(special(s))	Year(s)	Description
Big Break	Christmas Specials	1991-1998	
Blankety Blank	Christmas Specials	1979-1989, 1997-1999, 2016, 2020-present	
Blind Date	Christmas Specials	1987-1994, 2017	
Bob's Full House	Christmas Specials	1984-1989	
Bullseye	Christmas Specials	1982-1992, 2024-present	
Celebrity Mastermind	Christmas Special	2004–present	
The Chase	Christmas Specials	2012-present	
Countdown	Celebrity Countdown	1997	
The Cube	Christmas Special	2013	
Deal or No Deal	Scrooge vs Santa/ Christmas Star	2007–present	
The Generation Game	Christmas Special	1971-1981, 1990-2001	
Don't Ask Me	Christmas Special	1975	
Family Fortunes	Christmas Specials	1982-1994	
Give Us a Clue	Christmas Specials	1979-1984	
Play Your Cards Right	Christmas Specials	1981-1986	
Pointless	Christmas Special	2013–present	
The Weakest Link	Christmas Special	2021-present	
Who Wants to Be a Millionaire?	Celebrity Special	1998–2013	Since the show first started each year ITV will dedicate a few episodes at Christmas, where celebrities will try to win money for charity.

== Bands ==
Series/special	Episode	Year	Description
Busted's Christmas for Everyone		2003	Whilst doing their last concert before the Christmas holidays, Busted find that their guitars have all disappeared mysteriously.
The Girls Aloud Party		2008	
S Club 7's L.A. 7	Christmas Special	2000	

== Children's ==
=== BBC One/Two/CBBC ===
Series	Episode/special	Year(s)	Description
12 Again	Christmas Special	2012	
Airmageddon	Dad-mageddon: A Christmas Special	2016	
All-Star Record Breakers	Christmas Specials	1974-1982	
The Basil Brush Show	Christmas Specials	1970-1980	
Blue Peter	Christmas Show	1958–present	Annual Christmas show since 1958.
Bodger & Badger	Merry Christmas Everyone	1996	
Brambly Hedge	Winter Story	1996	
Copycats	Christmas Special	2016	
Emu's Broadcasting Corporation	Xmas Specials	1977-1979	
Diddy TV	Christmas Special	2016	
The Dog Ate My Homework	Christmas Special	2015	
Diddy Movies	A Christmas Christmas Movie	2013	
Eve	Christmas Eve	2015	
Going Live!	Scrooge - A Christmas Sarah	1990	
Hank Zipzer	Hank Zipzer's Christmas Catastrophe	2016	
Horrible Histories	Horrible Christmas	2010	
Little Howard's Big Question	Can Father Christmas Star in Our Nativity Play?	2010	
Maid Marian and Her Merry Men	Maid Marian and Much the Mini-Mart Manager's Son	1993	
Our School	Christmas is Coming	2014	
Pirates	Merry Christmas Pirates	1994	
The Pinky and Perky Show	It's Christmaaaas!	2008	
Rentaghost	RentaSanta	1979	
Sam & Mark's Big Friday Wind-Up	Sam & Mark's Big Christmas Wind-Up	2014–2016	
Sam & Mark's Sport Showdown	The Awesome Foursome v The Ultimates	2014	
Sam & Mark's TMI Friday	Christmas Special	2010	
Scream Street	The Grumpus	2016	
The Secret Show	Secret Santa	2007	
Shaun the Sheep	We Wish Ewe A Merry Christmas	2010	
Shaun the Sheep	Fleece Navidad	2025	
The Sooty Show	Xmas specials	1955-1967	
So Awkward	All We Want For Christmas	2019	
Strange Hill High	A Strange Hill Christmas	2014	
Wallace & Gromit's Cracking Contraptions	A Christmas Cardomatic	2002	
Zig and Zag's Zogcasts	Christmas	2016	

==== All at Sea ====
Episode/special	Year	Description
Murderer	2013	
Santa	2015	

==== 4 O'Clock Club ====
Episode/special	Year	Description
Christmas	2013	
Christmas Past	2018	

==== The Basil Brush Show ====
Episode/special	Year	Description
Molly Christmas	2002	
Basil's Christmas Turkey	2003	
It's a Wonderful Brush	2004	
Santa Brush	2005	
There's No Business Like Snow Business	2006	
Basil's Christmas Dinners	2007	

==== ChuckleVision ====
Episode/special	Year	Description
Traditional Christmas	1987	
Christmas Special	1988	
Messy Xmas	2002	
Christmas Chuckle	2002	
The Mystery Of Little-Under-Standing	2008	

==== Dani's House / Dani's Castle ====
Series	Episode(s)/(Special(s))	Year(s)	Description
Dani's House	Scrooge Tube	2009	
Dani's Castle	It's A Wonderful Afterlife	2015	

==== David Walliams adaptations ====
Shown on BBC One, sometimes repeated on CBBC, Ratburger was shown on Sky One.

Special	Year	Description
Mr Stink	2012	
Gangsta Granny	2013	
The Boy in the Dress	2014	
Billionaire Boy	2015	
Awful Auntie	2016	
Ratburger	2017	
Grandpa's Great Escape	2017	
The Midnight Gang	2018	
Gangsta Granny Strikes Again!	2022	

==== Danger Mouse ====
Episode/special	Year	Description
The Snowmen Cometh	2015	
Yule Only Watch Twice	2017	
Melted	2018	

==== Friday Download ====
Episode/special	Year	Description
Christmas Download	2011	
Christmas Download (with Olly Murs)	2012	
Christmas Download (with Little Mix and Bobby Lockwood	2013	
Christmas Download (with Echosmith, Bars and Melody & The Vamps)	2014	

==== Julia Donaldson (with Axel Scheffler) Adaptations ====
Shown on BBC One.

Special	Year	Description
The Gruffalo	2009	
The Gruffalo's Child	2011	
Room on the Broom	2012	
Stick Man	2015	
The Highway Rat	2017	
Zog	2018	
The Snail and the Whale	2019	
Zog and the Flying Doctors	2020	
Superworm	2021	
The Smeds and The Smoos	2022	
Tabby McTat	2023	
Tiddler	2024	
The Scarecrows' Wedding	2025	

==== Millie Inbetween ====
Episode/special	Year	Description
A Different Christmas	2014	
Craig Come Home	2015	
Dream Christmas	2016	

==== Norman Hunter Adaptations ====
Shown on BBC One, sometimes repeated on CBBC.

Special	Year	Description
The Incredible Adventures of Professor Branestawm	2014	
Professor Branestawm Returns	2015	

==== Paddington (TV series) ====
Episode	Year	Description
Paddington and the Christmas Shopping	1976	
Paddington's Christmas	1976	

==== The Slammer ====
Episode/special	Year	Description
A Slammer Christmas	2010	
Slammer Claus	2013	

==== The Story of Tracy Beaker / The Dumping Ground / The Beaker Girls ====
Series	Episode/specials	Year(s)	Description
The Story of Tracy Beaker	Christmas	2003	
The Dumping Ground	Jody in Wonderland	2013	
The Dumping Ground	Dumping Ground Island	2017	
The Beaker Girls	The Beaker Girls' Christmas	2021	

==== Top Class ====
Episode/special	Year	Celebrities
Christmas Celebrity Special 2016	2016	Lindsey Russell, Ricky Martin, Dick & Dom, Nick James, Stacy Liu, Ben Shires & Richard David-Caine
Christmas Celebrity Special 2017	2017	TBA

=== CBeebies ===
Series	Episode/special	Year	Description
3rd & Bird	A Very Squooky Christmas	2009	
Alphablocks	Letters to Santa	2021	
Big and Small	Five Minute Sled	2006	
Big Cook, Little Cook	Father Christmas	2008	
Boogie Beebies	I Wish It Would Snow	2005	
Brum	Brum and the Snow Thieves	2001	
Bump	Bump's Christmas Story	1994	
Charlie and Lola	How Many More Minutes Until Christmas?	2006	
Colourblocks	It's a Colourful Christmas	2023	
Grandpa in My Pocket	The Magic of Christmas	2010	
Hey Duggee	The Tinsel Badge	2014	
Hey Duggee	The Christmas Badge	2020	
Meg and Mog	Meg's Christmas	2003	
Numberblocks	The Twelve Days of Christmas	2021	
Pingu	Pingu's Family Celebrate Christmas	1992	
The Roly Mo Show	Too Cold	2004	
Tikkabilla	Christmas Special	2002	
The Large Family	Mr. Short's Christmas	2009	

==== Balamory ====
Episode/special	Year	Description
Panto	2002	
The Snowflake Fairy	2003	
The Pantomime	2003	
Seeking Santa	2005	

==== Bob the Builder ====
Episode/special	Year	Description
Bob's White Christmas	1999	
A Christmas to Remember	2001	
Mr. Bentley's Winter Fair	2004	

==== Bob the Builder (2015 TV series) ====
Episode/special	Year	Description
Pass the Parcel	2015	
A Present for Bob	2015	
Muck the Elf	2017	
A Christmas Fix	2017	

==== Charlie and Lola ====
Snow is My Favourite and My Best	2005
How Many More Minutes Until Christmas?	2006

==== Fireman Sam ====
Episode/special	Year	Description
Snow Business	1988	
Let it Snow	2005	
The Big Freeze	2005	
Santa Overboard	2008	

==== The Furchester Hotel ====
Episode/special	Year	Description
Monster Monster Day	2014	
A Furchester Christmas	2016	

==== Justin's House ====
Episode/special	Year	Description
All Wrapped Up	2011	
Cat's First Christmas	2016	

==== Postman Pat ====
Episode/special	Year	Description
Postman Pat's Magic Christmas	2004	
Postman Pat's Christmas Eve	2006	
The Flying Christmas Stocking	2008	
Postman Pat and the Christmas Panto Horse	2013	

==== Roary the Racing Car ====
Episode/special	Year	Description
Winter Breeze	2010	

==== Sarah & Duck ====
Episode/special	Year	Description
Petal Light Picking	2013	
Seacow Snow Trail	2014	

==== Teletubbies ====
Episode/special	Year	Description
Teletubbies and the Snow	1997	
Happy Christmas from the Teletubbies	1997	

==== Tweenies ====
Episode/special	Year	Description
The Fallen Star	1999	
Christmas Fairy	1999	
Santa's Little Helper	1999	
Nativity	1999	
Christmas Eve	1999	
Christmas Morning	2000	
White Christmas	2001	

=== CITV ===
Series	Episode/special	Year(s)	Description
Art Attack	Xmas specials	1994–1997, 2003	
Avenger Penguins	A Christmas Carol	1994	
Children's Ward	Christmas on Children's Ward	1991	
Count Duckula	A Christmas Quacker	1990	
Dodger, Bonzo and the Rest	Christmas Special	1987	
Educating Marmalade	The Nativity Play	1982	
Emu's All-Live Windmill Show	Emu at Christmas	1984	
The Enchanted House	Preparing for Christmas	1970	
Fetch the Vet	Happy Christmas, Duckhurst!	2001	
The Flaxton Boys	Keep the Home Fires Burning	1973	
Fun Song Factory	Christmas at the Fun Song Factory	1996	
Fun Song Factory	Christmas	2004	
How 2	Christmas Special	1997	
Jungle Run	Christmas Special	2003	Boy band Triple 8 were the contestants.
Mr Majeika	Have Yourself a Wizard Little Christmas	1988	
Mr. Men	Christmas Letter	1997	
My Phone Genie	Sack of Surprises	2013	
Smith and Goody	On Ice	1980	
Super Gran	Super Gran and the World's Worst Circus	1986	
Ted's Top Ten	Gone The Days of Sorrow Christmas Joy	2022	
The Raggy Dolls	Christmas Dolls	1986	
The Rubbish World of Dave Spud	Freeze A Jolly Spud Fellow	2019	
Tots TV	Snowy Adventure	1996	
The Worst Witch	Cinderella in Boots	2000	
Watership Down	Christmas on Watership Down	2000	
Worzel Gummidge	A Cup o' Tea and a Slice o' Cake	1980	
ZZZap!	Christmas Annuals	1996–1997	

==== Fraggle Rock ====
Episode/special	Year(s)	Description
The Bells of Fraggle Rock	1984	
Wembley and the Mean Genie	1988	

==== Horrid Henry ====
Episode/special	Year(s)	Description
Horrid Henry's Christmas	2006	
Horrid Henry and the Early Christmas Present	2011	
Horrid Henry and the Cracking Christmas	23 December 2012	The episode begins showing Toy Heaven outside. Henry (as narrator) loves Christmas and he has a chance to get anything you wanted. Henry and his family went on elevator and Henry listed the gifts he wanted. Henry and his family were surprise to see all toys in Toy Heaven. Henry gets on a train and plays around, and Henry said the chance to get the toys you didn't know. Henry saw a Boom-Boom Basher and picks up the controller. The Boom-Boom Basher drove towards Peter, and he shouted: 'Noooo!!!', opening the title card. Henry and his family visited Santa's Grotto. Henry wanted a Galactic Goo-Shooter and a Boom-Boom Basher to Santa, but Henry's parents shook their heads. Peter gave a present to Santa thanking him. Henry asked about his present, Santa replied, 'We'll see about that.'. Henry was at the backyard building a snowman with Stuck-Up Steve, but they both started fighting over the biggest snowman. Peter finished his snowman building himself as an ice angel, but Henry said it's not a snowman and calls it a smelly nappy baby ice angel. Henry and Steve started fighting over the biggest snowman. They shouted: 'MINE'S THE BIGGEST!!!' causing snow on roof to fall towards them. Henry said snow's the best thing in Christmas but Henry worries if it doesn't snow this year. Henry was having a nightmare about no snow and woke up if it's snowed yet. Henry heard a noise and walked to living room pleasing to snow. Then the music montage is showing footage in "Horrid Henry's Christmas" and one in "Horrid Henry and the Big Freeze Wheeze". In the morning, Henry look out of the window and was happy to see it snowing. Henry builds a snowman, but used up all of his snow in the front garden. Henry looks at the roof and throws a snowball, but the snow landed at Margaret's side. Henry needs more snow, so he kicks the soccer ball toward Margaret's tree and flung snow towards him. Peter asked Henry to borrow some snow, but he refused to. Because of Henry, Mum tells him not to be horrid. Peter walks to Margaret and asks some of her snow. Henry needs more snow, so he helps Dad clear off snow on Dad's car and gives him 50p. Henry earned Peter 50p for clearing off the snow off all the other cars. Margaret and Susan were building their snowman. Henry called it a snow baby. Margaret said it's a snowgirl, and her snowgirl is going to win the prize. Henry questions about the prize that goes to Margaret. Henry asked about the prize but both replied 'No.'. Henry grabs Margaret's shovel and tells Margaret about the prize or he will wreak her snowgirl. Susan walks off. Margaret explains about building the best snowman and tricking him. Henry went back to his front garden and realised all of his snow were gone. Susan had stolen all of Henry's snow, and Margaret thanks him. Henry shouted: 'Noooo!!!', ending the episode.

==== Mr. Bean: The Animated Series ====
Episode/special	Year(s)	Description
Young Bean	2003	
The Big Freeze	2019	

==== My Parents Are Aliens ====
Episode/special	Year(s)	Description
First Christmas: Part 1	2000	
First Christmas: Part 2	2000	
The Naughty List: Part 1	2004	
The Naughty List: Part 2	2004	
Winter Blunderland	2006	

==== Pocoyo ====
Episode/special	Year(s)	Description
Christmas Tree	2016	Released on ITVX.
An Alien Christmas Carol	2017	Released on ITVX.
Pocoyo's Christmas Carol	2017	Released on ITVX.
A Very Special Guest	2018	Released on ITVX.
Space Christmas	2020	Released on ITVX.
Christmas Far from Home	2020	Released on ITVX.
Christmas... at the Beach?	2021	Released on ITVX.
The Christmas Tree	2021	Released on ITVX.
Christmas Stakeout	2022	Released on ITVX.

==== The Sooty Show/ Sooty & Co./ Sooty Heights/ Sooty ====
Series	Episode/specials	Year(s)	Description
The Sooty Show	Xmas specials	1968-1988	
Sooty & Co.	Sooty's Christmas Panto	1996	
Sooty & Co.	Fun in the Snow	1997	
Sooty Heights	A Christmas Carrot	1999	
Sooty Heights	Sooty and the Beanstalk	2000	
Sooty	Santa's Back	2001	
Sooty	Pranks and Presents	2013	

==== T-Bag ====
Episode/special	Year(s)	Description
T-Bag's Christmas Cracker	1988	
T-Bag's Christmas Turkey	1991	

==== Thomas & Friends ====
Episode/special	Year(s)	Description
Thomas' Christmas Party	1984	
Thomas and the Missing Christmas Tree	1986	
Thomas and Percy's Christmas/Mountain Adventure	1992	
It's Only Snow	2002	
Not So Hasty Puddings	2003	
Don't Tell Thomas	2004	

=== Channel 5's Milkshake! ===
Series	Episode/special	Year(s)	Description
Toby's Travelling Circus	Momo's Christmas	2016	
Bob the Builder	A Christmas Fix	2017	
Little Princess	I Want to be Good	2007	
Little Princess	A Merry Little Christmas	2010	

==== Peppa Pig ====
Episode/special	Year(s)	Description
Peppa's Christmas	2007	
Santa's Grotto	2010	
Santa's Visit	2010	
Mr Potato's Christmas Show	2011	
Father Christmas	2017	
Christmas at the Hospital	2019	
Christmas With Kylie Kangaroo	2021	
Grandpa Pig's Christmas Present	2021	
Christmas Cards	2024	
Evie In The Future	2026	
Christmas with Baby Alexander	2022	
Christmas Lunch	2022	
Christmas Tree	2022	
Christmas Swim at Sea	2023	
Christmas Shopping	2024	
Naugthy or Nice	2024	
Mystery Gift	2024	
Santa's Workshop	2024	
Visting Santa	2024	
Christmas Eve	2025	
Christmas Light Trail	2025	
Festive Buffet	2025	
Cheeky Little Elf	2026	
Secret Passage	2026	

==== Ben & Holly's Little Kingdom ====
Episode/special	Year(s)	Description
Snow	2009	
The North Pole	2009	
Ben & Holly's Christmas - Part 1	2012	
Ben & Holly's Christmas - Part 2	2012	

==== Fireman Sam ====
Episode/special	Year(s)	Description
Santa Overboard	2008	
Floodlights	2012	
Dashing through the Snow	2016	

==== Thomas & Friends ====
Episode/special	Year(s)	Description
Keeping Up with James	2005	
Thomas' Tricky Tree	2006	
The Party Surprise	2008	
Henry's Magic Box	2010	
Surprise, Surprise	2011	
Tree Trouble	2011	
Salty's Surprise	2012	
The Christmas Tree Express	2012	
Santa's Little Engine	2013	
The Missing Christmas Decorations	2013	
Last Train for Christmas	2014	
Duncan the Humbug	2014	
The Perfect Gift	2014	
A Cranky Christmas	2016	
Diesel's Ghostly Christmas	2016	
Letters to Santa	2016	
The Christmas Coffeepot	2016	
Over the Hill	2016	
The Big Freeze	2017	
Terence Breaks the Ice	2017	
Daisy's Perfect Christmas	2017	

==== Thomas and Friends: Big World! Big Adventures! ====
Episode/special	Year(s)	Description
Thomas' Animal Ark	2018	
Kangaroo Christmas	2018	
Hunt the Truck/Car	2018	

=== ITV ===
==== The Adventures of Rupert Bear ====
Episode	Year(s)	Description
Rupert and the Christmas Toffee	1970	Series 1, Episode 8
Rupert and the Snowman	1970	Series 1, Episode 9
Rupert and the Christmas Stocking	1973	Series 3, Episode 14
Rupert's Christmas Party	1973	Series 3, Episode 15
Rupert at the Pantomime	1974	Series 3, Episode 14
Rupert and the White Christmas	1974	Series 4, Episode 34

==== Do Not Adjust Your Set ====
Episode/special	Year(s)	Description
A Happy Boxing Day and a Preposterous New Year	1967	
Do Not Adjust Your Stocking	1968	

==== The Ghosts of Motley Hall ====
Episode/special	Year	Description
The Christmas Spirit	1976	
Phantomime	1977	Double length episode

==== How ====
Episode/special	Year(s)	Description
Christmas Special	1968	Lost
A Special Christmas How	1974	Lost

==== The Wind in the Willows ====
Episode/special	Year	Description
The Yuletide Entertainment	1984	
Fancy Dress	1986	Was aired in March
Tunnels and Tremors	1988	Was aired in March

=== S4C ===
Series	Episode/special	Year(s)	Description
Llan-ar-goll-en	Ceirw Coll Siôn Corn	2014	Aired on Christmas Eve
Llan-ar-goll-en	Trwyn Coch	2015	Aired on Christmas Eve

=== Netflix ===
Series	Episode/special	Year(s)	Description
Hilda	Chapter 10: The Yule Lads	2020	

=== Others ===
==== Gerry Anderson productions ====
Sometimes repeated on BBC One, but was originally shown on ITV.

Series	Episode/special	Year(s)	Description
Joe 90	The Unorthodox Shepherd	1968	
Stingray	A Christmas to Remember	1964	
Thunderbirds	Give or Take a Million	1966	
Terrahawks	A Christmas Miracle	1983	

==== Raymond Briggs Adaptations ====
Usual shown on Channel 4.

Special	Year(s)	Description
The Bear	1998	
Father Christmas	1991	
Ivor the Invisible	2001	
The Snowman	1982	
The Snowman and the Snowdog	2012	
The Abominable Snowman Baby	2021	

== Specials ==
- Ant & Dec Saturday Night Takeaway at Christmas (2005)
- Ant & Dec's Christmas Show (2009)
- Bring Back... The Christmas Number One (2005)
- The Funny Side of Christmas (1982)
- Greatest Christmas Comedy Moments (2008)
- Oz and Hugh Drink to Christmas (2009)
- The Real Hustle: The 12 Scams of Christmas (2006)
- Ruth Jones Christmas Cracker (2009–present)
- The Gadget Man Guide to Christmas (2014)
- A Christmas Cracker (2014)
- The Very Small Cratures:
- A Very Small Christmas (2021)
- Nutcracker (2025)

=== Top Gear ===
Episode	Year	Notes
Vietnam Special	2008	
Bolivia Special	2009	
Middle East Special	2010	
India Special	2011	
Africa Special	2013	A two part special, referred to as a "Christmas special" by the presenters despite it being broadcast in March
Burma Special	2014	A two part special, referred to as a "Christmas special" by the presenters despite it being broadcast in March
Patagonia Special	2014	A two part special
Nepal Special	2019	
Driving Home for Christmas	2021	

== Misc ==
- Channel 4's Alternative Christmas message (1993 – present)
- Midnight Mass (1960 – present) – Every year Christmas morning starts on BBC with Midnight Mass for Catholics.
- The Royal Institution Christmas Lectures (1966 – present). Note: The Royal Institution Christmas Lectures have been going since 1825 but started being broadcast in 1966.
- The Royal Christmas Message (1957–1968, 1970 – present). Note: The Royal Christmas message has been read as far back as King George V in 1932 & 1935 over the radio, and then George VI in 1939, 1941–1942, 1945–1946, 1949 and 1951 up until Queen Elizabeth II read it on the radio from 1952 to 1956. It wasn't until 1957 that the event was televised.
- Songs of Praise (1961 – present) – Every year songs of Praise celebrates advent Sunday's leading up to Christmas.
- Text Santa (2011–2015)
- Star Over Bethlehem (1977, 1979, 1981) - A live satellite transmission that featured Christmas music from around the world. US contributions included remotes from a shopping mall in Columbia, South Carolina and the CBN studios in Virginia Beach, Virginia.

== See also ==
- Christmas in the media
- List of Doctor Who Christmas and New Year's specials
- List of Christmas television specials
- List of United States Christmas television episodes
- List of United States Christmas television specials
- List of A Christmas Carol adaptations
- List of Christmas films
- List of Made-for-Television and Direct-To-Video Christmas films
- Christmas music
- List of Halloween television specials
- List of Thanksgiving television specials
- Lists of television specials
