= Morons from Outer Space =

- Theatrical release poster
- Directed by: Mike Hodges
- Written by: Griff Rhys Jones; Mel Smith
- Produced by: Barry Hanson
- Starring: Griff Rhys Jones; Mel Smith; Joanne Pearce; Jimmy Nail; James B. Sikking
- Edited by: Peter Boyle
- Music by: Peter Brewis
- Production company: Thorn EMI Screen Entertainment
- Distributed by: Thorn EMI Screen Entertainment
- Release date: 29 March 1985
- Running time: 91 minutes
- Country: United Kingdom
- Language: English
- Budget: £5 million
- Box office: £1.5 million (in UK) or £1,968,000 (UK)

Morons from Outer Space is a 1985 British comedy-science fiction film directed by Mike Hodges and written by and starring Griff Rhys Jones and Mel Smith. It also stars Jimmy Nail and James B. Sikking.

== Plot ==
A small spaceship docks at a refuelling station, carrying four aliens: Bernard, Sandra, Desmond, and Julian. During a particularly tedious period at the station, Sandra, Desmond, and Julian begin playing with the ship's controls, while Bernard goes outside to play a game of spaceball. Their recklessness causes a malfunction that disconnects Bernard's part of the ship, leaving him stranded, while the other three crash-land on a nearby blue planet — Earth.

The trio arrives in the United Kingdom, where their unusual appearance immediately draws attention. They are captured and interrogated in a secret government facility. Threatened with murder by a paranoid American colonel, they escape with the assistance of a hapless TV reporter, Graham Sweetley. Following their escape, they become instant celebrities, despite offering no technological knowledge or significant insight to humanity. Sweetley becomes their manager, organizing appearances and performances, and the aliens quickly achieve fame and wealth, entertaining audiences who are fascinated by their novelty rather than their abilities.

Meanwhile, Bernard arrives on Earth separately, landing in the United States. Despite being the most intelligent of the group, he receives no recognition or celebrity. His claims of being an alien are dismissed, and he experiences homelessness and a brief stay in a mental hospital. Near the end of the film, Bernard reunites with his companions in the UK. Sandra, Desmond, and Julian, fearing that Bernard’s presence might diminish their fame, initially conceal that he had been traveling with them all along.

== Cast ==
- Joanne Pearce as Sandra Brock
- Jimmy Nail as Desmond Brock
- Paul Bown as Julian Tope
- James Sikking as Colonel Raymond Laribee
- Dinsdale Landen as Commander Grenville Matteson
- Tristram Jellinek as Simpson
- George Innes as Stanley Benson
- Mel Smith as Bernard
- Griff Rhys Jones as Graham Sweetley
- Mark Lewis Jones as Godfrey
- Leonard Fenton as Commissionaire
- Andre Maranne as Professor Trousseau
- Jimmy Mulville as Motorway Policeman
- Leslie Grantham as Motorway Policeman's Assistant
- Miriam Margolyes as Dr. Wallace

== Production ==
Barry Hanson was working on the project in August 1983. It was written by and starred Mel Smith and Griff Rhys Jones, who were known for the sketch shows Not the Nine O'Clock News and Alas Smith and Jones. Rhys Jones said the aliens in his film "don't threaten, they don't inform, they just come to earth to do a bit of shopping. I suppose the message is the rest of the universe is just as moronic as ourselves."

In November 1983 Thorn EMI announced it would make the film. It was part of the initial slate of four films from Thorn EMI's new chairman, Verity Lambert, the others being Slayground, Dreamchild and Comfort and Joy.

Lambert offered the film to director Mike Hodges, who agreed if EMI would make a script of his, Mid-Atlantic, and signed a two-picture deal. The movie was originally entitled Illegal Aliens.

In December 1984, Thorn EMI offered investors the chance to invest in several films by issuing £36 million worth of shares. The films were A Passage to India (1984), Illegal Aliens, Dreamchild, Wild Geese II and The Holcroft Covenant.

The release of the film caused Mel Brooks to retitle a film he was working on from Planet Moron to Spaceballs.

According to Jimmy Nail, the original script was more bawdy but the language was toned down at the request of Universal. "A big mistake," wrote Nail, "Mel and Griff were never kids' comedians."

== Reception ==
=== Critical ===
The Observer called the film "so embarrassingly unfunny I often felt like crawling under my seat." The Evening Standard called it "witless... lame to the point of pain... a dire reminder of the worst we [British film] can do... a costly fiasco."

Jimmy Nail wrote in his memoirs, "The film had its faults and it was no masterpiece, but it didn’t deserve that kind of smart-arse dismissal... Mel and Griff are two tip-top geezers... Sadly Morons From Outer Space, through no fault of theirs, inhabited a place that was neither adult, kids’ nor juvenile humour. It missed the spot and just about finished off Mel and Griff as film-makers almost before they’d started. Not for the first time, a really good opportunity had been squandered by anonymous executives who had called it wrong."

Empire criticized its "loose script whose weaknesses are all the more glaring for the film's inability to exploit the power of absurdity."

In the US, the Los Angeles Times said "it might have made a moderately amusing 15 minute TV sketch."

Mike Hodges disliked the film, regarding it as a "misfire". He clashed with Smith and Jones in post production, an article claiming "they did not trust, or perhaps understand his comedic judgement or cinematic visual satire and the film became far more broad than he had intended." However, he did enjoy satirising the sentimental "Spielbergian vision of the world".

Jon Spira of BFI has argued in support of the movie calling it "a genuinely funny film" which "combines the most base physical humour with sophisticated social commentary. It mocks British social mores, aggressive American foreign policy, and every level of the establishment and media... Specifically, Morons from Outer Space was an attempt to burst the bubble of late 70s/early 80s sci-fi as ushered in by Steven Spielberg."

=== Box office ===
The film earned £1.5 million in the UK and was the nineteenth most popular movie of the year in England. However it only earned $17,000 in the US.
