= The Love for Three Oranges (disambiguation) =

The Love for Three Oranges is a 1919 opera by Sergei Prokofiev.

The Love for Three Oranges may also refer to:

- The Love for Three Oranges (fairy tale), Italian fairy tale by Giambattista Basile in Pentamerone

== See also ==
- "The Love of Three Oranges" (Dad's Army), a 1976 Christmas episode of British series Dad's Army
