= Smith and Goody =

- Created by: Mel Smith; Bob Goody
- Starring: Mel Smith; Bob Goody; Peter Brewis
- Country of origin: United Kingdom
- Original language: English
- No. of series: 1
- No. of episodes: 7

Production
- Producer: Thames Television
- Running time: 30 minutes per episode

Original release
- Network: ITV
- Release: 23 September – 30 December 1980

Smith and Goody is a children's sketch show on ITV from the 1980s. It was made for the ITV network by Thames Television. It starred, and was written by Mel Smith (at the time, part of the Not The Nine O'Clock News show on BBC2) and Bob Goody, with music provided by Peter Brewis. As well as being a comedy, the series tried to advocate literature. It was set in a flat in which books, newspapers and magazines were in abundance and the sketches were designed to encourage young people to enjoy reading.

Smith and Goody, one short and the other very tall, made for the stereotypical double-act partnership, and had worked together since meeting at drama school, putting together a joint production at the 1977 Edinburgh Festival Fringe.

There was a Christmas Special, Smith And Goody On Ice, which largely abandoned the educational book-led format in favour of a number of sketches.

== Theme tune ==
The opening credits began with cartoon renditions of the presenters engaged in a friendly exchange:
Mel: Whatcha Bob
Bob: Whatcha Mel
Mel: Whatcha been up to?
Bob: Can't you tell?
Bob: I've been having a look at a book mate
Bob: I've been taking a squint at the print
Bob: Been thumbing me way through a paperback a day
Bob: and I'll tell you all about it if you're int-er-est-ed
The chorus went something like:
"Good books, bad books, funny books, ever-been-had books"
"Good books, bad books, ever-been-had books and sad books."
There's a book about a plane that disappeared without a trace,"
There's a book about a man who came from outer space"
Mel: Tell you what, Bob. What's next?
