= The Tall Guy =

- Theatrical release poster
- Directed by: Mel Smith
- Written by: Richard Curtis
- Starring: Jeff Goldblum; Emma Thompson; Rowan Atkinson
- Cinematography: Adrian Biddle
- Production companies: London Weekend Television; Working Title Films
- Distributed by: Virgin Vision
- Release dates: 23 June 1989 (UK); 21 September 1990 (US)
- Running time: 86 minutes
- Country: United Kingdom
- Language: English
- Budget: $3 million
- Box office: $5 million

The Tall Guy is a 1989 British romantic comedy and the feature film debut of screenwriter Richard Curtis and the directorial debut of Mel Smith. It was produced by London Weekend Television for theatrical release and stars Jeff Goldblum, Emma Thompson and Rowan Atkinson. Curtis's script draws from his experiences as straight man to long-time collaborator Rowan Atkinson.

== Plot ==
The protagonist and narrator is Dexter King, an American actor working in London and living platonically in Camden Town with his "educated, charming... nymphomaniac" landlady. He has just finished his sixth year playing "The Tall Guy", a straight man in a two-man, long-running comedy revue starring (and dominated by) Ron Anderson.

Chronic hay fever prompts him to see a doctor, where he meets and falls quickly in love with Kate, who works there as a nurse.

Soon after meeting Kate, Dexter is fired by Ron. After being rejected for a role in a new Steven Berkoff play for "lacking anger", Dexter wins the title role in a new Royal Shakespeare Company musical based on The Elephant Man. It's "a sparkily nasty send-up of Andrew Lloyd Webber" called Elephant! which features a song called "He’s Packing His Trunk" and a finale which ends with the lyric "Somewhere up in heaven there's an angel with big ears!"

During rehearsal, Dexter succumbs to the advances of a married co-star. On the new musical's opening night, Kate puts together evidence of the affair from a few subtle clues, and leaves Dexter without further ado.

After seeing a scene in a televised award show that suggests Ron is now dating Kate, Dexter impulsively gives up his role in Elephant! just before the curtain rises, with plans to make an impassioned plea to Kate to take him back. With Ron's involuntary help (Dexter ties him up in his dressing room and steals his car), Dexter presents his case to Kate in a busy hospital ward. Kate agrees to give him another chance.

== Cast ==
The cast includes:

- Jeff Goldblum as Dexter King
- Rowan Atkinson as Ron Anderson
- Emma Thompson as Kate Lemmon
- Geraldine James as Carmen
- Anna Massey as Mary
- Kim Thomson as Cheryl
- Hugh Thomas as Dr. Karabekian
- Emil Wolk as Cyprus Charlie
- Tim Barlow as Mr. Morrow
- Harold Innocent as Timothy
- Joanna Kanska as Tamara
- Angus Deayton as Actor in Agent's Office
- Jason Isaacs as 2nd Doctor

The film also includes cameo appearances from John Inman, Melvyn Bragg, Suggs, Jonathan Ross and director Mel Smith.

== Production ==
Principal photography occurred in 1988. It was originally called Camden Town Boy. Nearly twenty years later, Mel Smith, calling his directorial debut the high point of his career, commented on the directing experience: "I didn't know enough about the film business, and so it seemed wonderfully easy."

== Reception ==
=== Critical reception ===
Upon its September 1990 US release, Entertainment Weekly gave it a B−, describing it as "mildly charming and mostly too broad" and accusing it of overplaying "Dexter's dorkiness in the same way it overplays the big sex scene, the romantic montage, the breakup scene…" Caryn James of The New York Times wrote "even when its bright theatrical satire gives way to men dressed as nuns dancing in wimples and red sequined shorts, this modest comedy is always wickedly endearing, thanks to the off-kilter characters played by Mr. Goldblum and Emma Thompson as the unlikely woman of his dreams." Roger Ebert called the film a "sweet, whimsical and surprisingly intelligent comedy" whose "last third ...turns into a hilarious sendup of the modern musical" that "must be the funniest deliberately bad play in a movie since Mel Brooks' "Springtime for Hitler" in The Producers." The Deseret News called it a "most uneven romantic comedy," saying "If you're a Monty Python fan, lower your expectations a notch. We're more in Benny Hill territory here....The highlights here are easily the staged "Elephant!" sequences, with some very funny sendups of the gargantuan musicals of Andrew Lloyd Webber."

On review aggregator Rotten Tomatoes, the film has an approval rating of 86% based on 21 reviews and an average rating of 6.6/10. In a 2003 mid-career retrospective about Richard Curtis, The Guardian described the film as being "patronised in one sense by critics while not patronised in the other by audiences." It also identified several tropes from The Tall Guy that would be utilised in his subsequent romantic comedies, (Four Weddings and a Funeral, Notting Hill and Love Actually):

- romantic lightning strikes that "Curtis seems to believe in as much as any figure in history apart from Cupid";
- the "willingness to sacrifice realism to a gag" (e.g. turning cartwheels in front of a giant Moon to show that Dexter is in love);
- the "wacky but wise" flatmate;
- the use of eccentric obscenities (e.g. Ron's question "What in the name of Judas Iscariot's bumboy is going on?").

=== Box office ===
The film grossed $5 million worldwide, including £1,586,383 in the United Kingdom and $510,712 in the United States and Canada.

== Soundtrack ==
The score is by Peter Brewis. The soundtrack also includes Labi Siffre's "It Must Be Love", performed by Madness. The film features a montage in which various characters sing along to this song, and which includes a cameo by Madness frontman Suggs. Other tracks include "Let the Heartaches Begin" (Long John Baldry), "Heartbreak Hotel" (Sam Williams), "Breaking Up Is Hard to Do" and "Crying in the Rain" (both performed by Phil Pope).

== Home video ==
According to WorldCat, the film was released on VHS and Laserdisc in 1990 by RCA/Columbia Pictures Home Video. It was released on VHS in the UK by Virgin Vision, and on DVD in 2003 by Buena Vista Home Entertainment.
