= Bob Goody =

British actor (1951–2023)

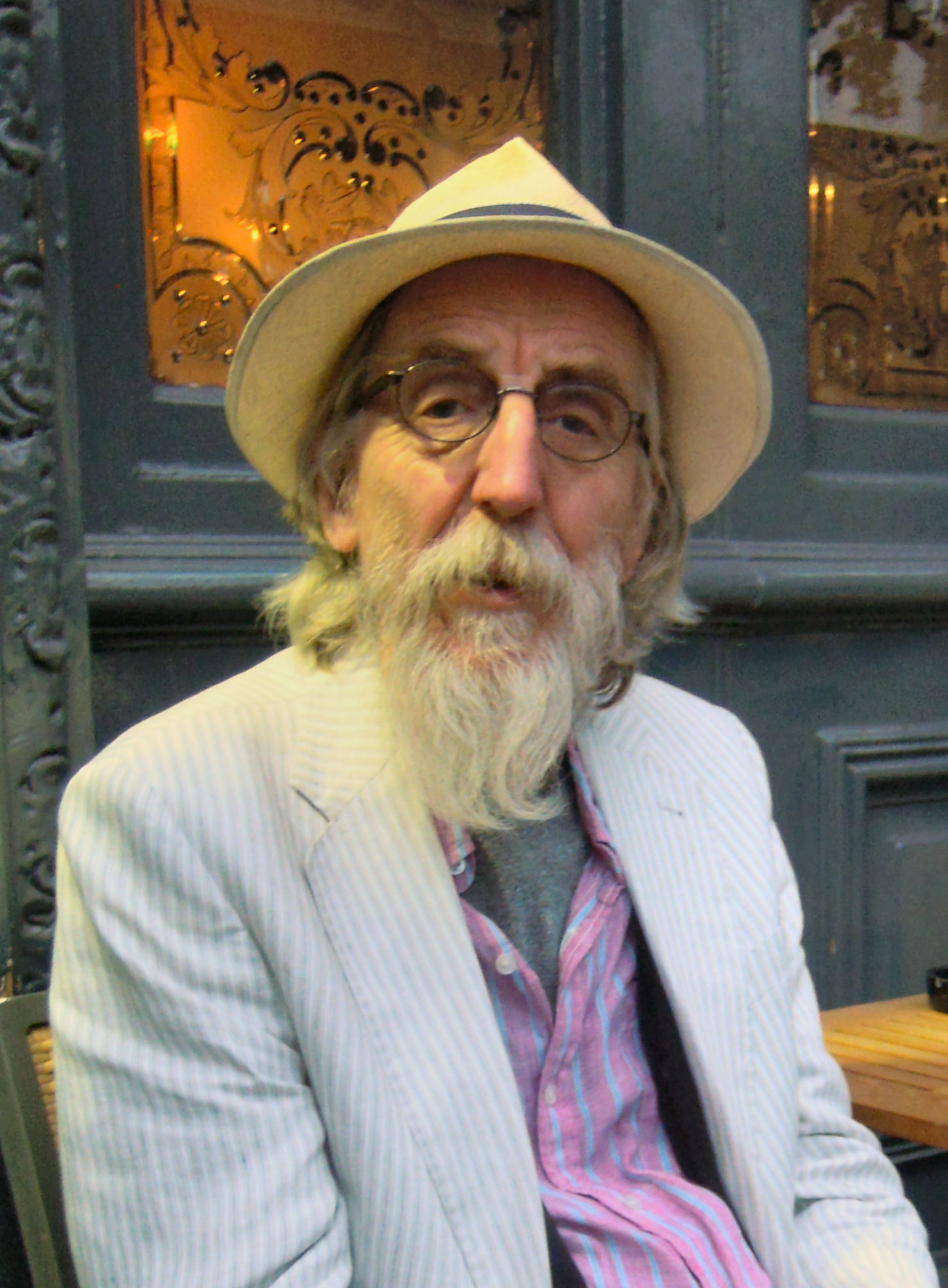
Goody in 2015

Robert Goody (16 April 1951 – 5 March 2023) was a British actor, librettist, writer and former member of the Royal Shakespeare Company.

== Early life ==
Goody was born in Brighton, East Sussex, the son of Kenneth William Goody (1926–2005), an airline training manager, and his wife, Hilda Jesse, née Parker (1925–2015). He attended Brighton, Hove and Sussex Grammar School followed by Brighton Technical College.

== Theatre work ==
Bob Goody trained at the Royal Academy of Dramatic Art (1973–1975). He was a founder member of the acclaimed theatre company Shared Experience performing the Arabian Nights trilogy. He played various characters with the company, including: Aleksandr Torra, the Torbinator and the Turnpike in Hamlet. In 1987, he toured as Dr. Pinch in The Comedy of Errors and as the Ghost and the Gravedigger in Hamlet with the Royal Shakespeare Company. Goody's performances with the National Theatre of Brent in the early 1980s were noted by contemporaries as influential on emerging comedians and performers. In 1991 he played the Chief Weasel in Alan Bennett's adaptation of The Wind in the Willows for the National Theatre at The Old Vic in London.

In January and February 2016, he played Lucky opposite Lorcan Cranitch and Jeff Rawle as Vladimir and Estragon and Richard Cordery as Pozzo in Samuel Beckett's Waiting for Godot at the Crucible Theatre in Sheffield. The production was described by The Telegraph as having a "stark brutality", and added that "Bob Goody's Lucky is also tremendous, with his spidery, Dickensian limbs, yellowing hair and death-mask face, like some ghastly apparition resembling all their future selves."

== Film and television roles ==
Goody made his first television appearance in The Devil's Crown (1978) and went on to appear in Sherlock Holmes and Doctor Watson (1979), Robin's Nest (1980), Smith and Goody (as writer and actor) (1980), Luna (1983), Bleak House (1985), The Kenny Everett Television Show (1985), Porterhouse Blue (1987), Selling Hitler (1991), Blue Heaven (1992), The Blackheath Poisonings (1992), Lovejoy (1993), Screen Two (1993), Paul Merton's Life of Comedy (1995), McCallum (1997), Danny the caretaker in seven episodes of Crime Traveller (1997), Lock, Stock... (2000), Dark Realm (2001), Doctors (2003), four episodes of The Bill (1989–2004), Hotel Babylon (2008), Crusoe (2008), EastEnders (2011), Gustave in X Company (2015), Squire in Cider with Rosie (2015) and Sir Ray Ives in Queens of Mystery (2019).

His film roles include appearances in Flash Gordon (1980), Those Glory Glory Days (1983), The Stone Age (1989), The Cook the Thief His Wife & Her Lover (1989), Fire, Ice and Dynamite (1990), Buskers Odyssey (1994), The Grotesque (1995), Treasure Island (1995), The Borrowers (1997), Lighthouse (1999), In the Doghouse (2002), The Thief Lord (2006), That Summer Day (2006), The Great Ghost Rescue (2011), Late September (2012), Mr. Turner (2014), Peterloo (2018) and 23 Walks (2020).

== As a writer ==
While Goody and Mel Smith were working on a two-man show at the Traverse Theatre, they teamed up with composer Peter Brewis and together created three black comedy musicals, 'Ave You 'Eard the One About Joey Baker?, Irony in Dorking which won a Fringe First Award and The Gambler whose 1986 revival at the Hampstead Theatre was nominated for an Olivier Award and was also recorded by the specialist musical theatre label First Night Records. He wrote the libretto for The Fashion, an opera for Deutsche Oper am Rhein, with music by Giorgio Battistelli. This was performed in the company's 2008 season. He co-wrote the BBC sitcom Wilderness Road as well as two volumes of performance poetry: Mixing With The Sharks and Life and Death And A Few Other Bits and Pieces.

Goody played Bill Maddox in the 1996 video game Privateer 2: The Darkening.

== Personal life and death ==
Bob Goody was 6' 4" tall and lived in Bloomsbury in central London. He is survived by his wife Gina (nee Donovan), whom he married in 1978, their daughters Gemma, Seonaid and Sophie, grandchildren Zack, Ayah, Constance and Dolores, and his brother Dave Goody.

Goody died from cancer on 5 March 2023, aged 71.
