= The Chicken Song =

Single by Spitting Image featuring The Wet Gits

from the album Spit in Your Ear
- B-side: "I've Never Met a Nice South African"; "Hello, You Must Be Going"; "We're Scared of Bob"
- Released: April 1986
- Recorded: 1986
- Genre: Pop; parody
- Length: 2:37 (7" version)
- Label: Central TV; Virgin
- Composer: Philip Pope
- Lyricists: Rob Grant; Doug Naylor
- Producer: Philip Pope

"The Chicken Song" is a novelty song by the British satirical comedy television programme Spitting Image (series 3, episode 6). The nonsensical lyrics were written by Rob Grant and Doug Naylor; the music was written by Philip Pope, who also produced the song, with Michael Fenton Stevens and Kate Robbins as vocalists.

The song was a parody of summer holiday disco songs such as "Agadoo" and "Do the Conga", which were in vogue during the mid-1980s. The song made specific reference to the group Black Lace, who performed those songs ("those two wet gits, with their girly curly hair"). The song featured heavily during the 1986 series of Spitting Image, playing recurrently in the background, and being hummed by characters; at one stage, the puppet of Pope John Paul II played it on a banjolele. A subsequent release as a single reached number one in the official UK Singles Chart for three weeks in 1986.

== Song versions ==
On the Spit in Your Ear album, the "Celebrity Mega Mix" version of "The Chicken Song" was included, which features vocal impressions of celebrities such as Bruce Springsteen, Bob Dylan and Tina Turner singing the lyrics. The 12" single of "The Chicken Song" featured the extended "12 hour version", which contains numerous random repetitions of the verses and chorus at times when the song appears to be over. When the track is actually finished and the stylus reaches the end of the run-out groove, the first bar of the song is constantly repeated in the final locked groove.

== B-sides ==
On the second B-side (the single was released as a "double B-side") of the 7" and 12" singles was another popular song from Spitting Image, "I've Never Met a Nice South African", which mocked the apartheid-era nation's white people, especially Afrikaners. The 12" single also contained "Hello, You Must Be Going", a parody of Phil Collins who seems as much concerned about his receding hairline as his failed relationship, and "We're Scared of Bob", a parody of the Band Aid / USA for Africa charity records with the various artists suggesting they were only making the record because they were too afraid to say no when Bob Geldof asked them.

== Track listings ==
=== 7" vinyl ===
Side one
No.	Title	Lyrics	Music	Length
1.	"The Chicken Song"	Rob Grant, Doug Naylor	Philip Pope	2:37

Side two
No.	Title	Lyrics	Music	Length
1.	"(I've Never Met) A Nice South African"	John Lloyd	Peter Brewis	3:08

=== 12" vinyl ===
Side one
No.	Title	Lyrics	Music	Length
1.	"The Chicken Song (12 Hour Version)"	Rob Grant, Doug Naylor	Philip Pope	6:59

Side two
No.	Title	Lyrics	Music	Length
1.	"(I've Never Met) A Nice South African"	John Lloyd	Peter Brewis	3:08
2.	"Hello, You Must Be Going"	Ian Hislop, Nick Newman	Philip Pope
3.	"We're Scared of Bob"	Rob Grant, Doug Naylor	Philip Pope	2:50

== Chart performance ==
Chart (1986)	Peak position
Dutch GfK Chart	49
Irish Singles Chart	1
UK singles chart	1
