= I've Never Met a Nice South African =

1986 satirical song by Spitting Image

Song by Spitting Image

from the album Spit in Your Ear
- A-side: "The Chicken Song"
- Released: April 1986
- Recorded: 1986
- Genre: Pop, Satire, Ska
- Length: 3:08
- Label: Central TV / Virgin
- Songwriters: John Lloyd; Peter Brewis
- Producer: Philip Pope

"I've Never Met a Nice South African" is a satirical song originating in a sketch on the British television series Spitting Image (series 2, episode 5). It was written by John Lloyd and Peter Brewis and was sung by Andy Roberts. Its melody takes inspiration from the song "Cool for Cats" by Squeeze. In 1986 it was commercially released as the B-side of the chart-topping "The Chicken Song". When the song was recorded, South West Africa (now Namibia) remained an unofficial colony of South Africa, which was still under the apartheid regime and widely considered to be a pariah state as a result.

The song is narrated in the music video by a seasoned expatriate traveller who describes a number of experiences that are unlikely ("I met a man in Kathmandu who claimed to have two willies"), fantastical ("I've seen unicorns in Burma and a Yeti in Nepal"), absurd ("I've had a close encounter of the 22nd kind, that's when an alien spaceship disappears up your behind"), nonsensical ("I've danced with ten foot pygmies"), seemingly impossible ("I've had sunstroke in the Arctic and a swim in Timbuktu"), or humorously defy stereotypes ("[I've met a] working Yorkshire miner") to a bored bartender (Lord Lucan), stressing at the end of each verse that, despite all these exotic experiences, he has never met a nice South African.

The chorus is sung by a number of gun-toting Afrikaners and a sheep, out on safari wearing Springbok jerseys, who bluntly describe themselves in a variety of insulting ways, such as "arrogant bastards who hate black people", "ignorant loud-mouths with no sense of humour" and "talentless murderers who smell like baboons". As the song progresses, dead animals are piled up on their Land Rover and the barman becomes ever sleepier before collapsing on the floor.

In the closing verse, the South African chorus names writer and anti-apartheid activist Breyten Breytenbach, exceptionally, as "quite a nice South African" who has "hardly ever killed anyone", and says "that's why we put him in prison". At the time Breytenbach had, as the song points out, been living in exile in Paris and had been previously imprisoned by the South African regime for treason.

In 2009, Lawrence Hamilton published a journal article called "'(I've Never Met) a Nice South African': Virtuous Citizenship and Popular Sovereignty".
