= Wake Up Walmington =

- Dad's Army episode
- Episode no.: Series 9 Episode 1
- Directed by: Bob Spiers
- Story by: Jimmy Perry and David Croft
- Original air date: 2 October 1977
- Running time: 30 minutes

Episode chronology
← Previous "The Love of Three Oranges"	Next → "The Making of Private Pike"

"Wake Up Walmington" is the first episode of the ninth and final series of the British comedy series Dad's Army. It was originally transmitted on 2 October 1977.

== Synopsis ==
When nobody seems to be too concerned about the war, the platoon dress up as fifth columnists to give the townsfolk a fright.

== Plot ==
It is now a few years into the war, and the platoon are having firing practice at a country house. However, they are rudely interrupted and told to "keep the noise down" by the haughty butler. Back at the church hall, Mainwaring and Wilson discuss how complacency is setting in amongst the townsfolk, and how people are seeing them as "Geriatric Fusiliers". As they discuss it, they are interrupted by ARP Warden Hodges, who is in tears after Mr Bluett verbally attacked him for trying to do his job, and how people do not seem to be taking the war seriously.

Remembering the national reaction after the platoon were recently mistaken for enemy agents during a training exercise, Mainwaring decides to get his men to masquerade as fifth columnists in "very sinister clothes" to scare the townsfolk and become appreciated again, and to prevent a repeat of last time he informs the Colonel at GHQ of the plan, called "Operation Wake-Up". Taking pity on him, Mainwaring invites Hodges to join them, which he gratefully accepts.

The platoon (with the exception of Godfrey, who remains at the church hall to act as their contact man) meet up at their "secret base", although things get out of hand with disguises: Mainwaring wears an eyepatch over his glasses, Pike is dressed as an American gangster, Frazer is in his undertaker attire, and Jones is dressed as a nun. Mainwaring finds Jones' disguise unbearable and makes him wear his regular clothes instead.

The platoon and Hodges begin roaming the countryside, acting menacingly. At first, their efforts to frighten the locals are unsuccessful. They first stop a man in a truck and ask him where the aerodrome is (with Jones attempting a foreign accent) but the annoyed man just drives off, splashing Mainwaring with mud. Next, the men pretend to interrogate Hodges and assault him. A big man arrives and recognises Jones as the local butcher, and Hodges, who had short-changed the man some time before, and punches the latter in the face out of vengeance. Lastly, the platoon come across a group of men and assume from their similar clothing that they are real fifth columnists. Mainwaring questions them, even getting his revolver out, but one of the men casually disarms him and they all begin arguing.

However, the platoon finally manages to cause some concern with their talk of "blowing up an aerodrome", but the frightened locals send out for the Home Guard. With Mainwaring's platoon absent from their post, the neighbouring Eastgate platoon, led by Captain Square, are called out, using Jones' van (which is still at the church hall) as transport. Tracking the platoon down to the disused flour mill they are using as their base, Square and his men open fire, covering them in flour.

The men realise that Square had fallen for their trick. Mainwaring calls him a fool, and the episode ends with the two of them exchanging insults.

== Cast ==
- Arthur Lowe as Captain Mainwaring
- John Le Mesurier as Sergeant Wilson
- Clive Dunn as Lance Corporal Jones
- John Laurie as Private Frazer
- Arnold Ridley as Private Godfrey
- Ian Lavender as Private Pike
- Bill Pertwee as ARP Warden Hodges
- Frank Williams as The Vicar
- Edward Sinclair as The Verger
- Geoffrey Lumsden as Captain Square
- Sam Kydd as the Yokel
- Harold Bennett as Mr Bluett
- Robert Raglan as The Colonel
- Charles Hill as the Butler
- Jeffrey Holland as the Soldier
- Barry Linehan as the Truck Driver
- Colin Bean as Private Sponge
- Alister Williamson as Bert
- Michael Stainton as Frenchy

== Notes ==
1. In this episode, Pike dresses up as a Chicago gangster, Mainwaring wears an eye-patch and Jones dresses up as a nun. In the war there were numerous reports that German parachutists were disguising themselves as nuns, something referenced several times in the series.
2. At the "Six Bells" country pub, one character describes Dover as being "about twenty miles away". Later this pub is described as "five miles from Walmington", on the Dymchurch road. This implies that Walmington is in the vicinity of Hythe, Kent.
3. This was Captain Square's last appearance in the programme.
4. When Mainwaring and Square are arguing at the end, Mainwaring mentions that he is not a member of the golf club, a fact previously established in The Honourable Man.
5. The opening scene with the platoon having a firing practice was filmed at Lynford Hall, Norfolk.

== Sources ==
- Croft, David; Perry, Jimmy; Webber, Richard (2003). Dad's Army: The Complete Scripts. Orion. ISBN 0-7528-6024-0
