= Turkey Dinner =

- Dad's Army episode
- Episode no.: Series 7 Episode 6
- Directed by: David Croft
- Story by: Jimmy Perry and David Croft
- Original air date: 23 December 1974
- Running time: 30 minutes

Episode chronology
← Previous "The Captain's Car"	Next → "Ring Dem Bells"

"Turkey Dinner" is the sixth episode of the seventh series of the British comedy series Dad's Army. It was originally transmitted on Monday, 23 December 1974. Although not a Christmas special, it was the Christmas episode, and was originally planned for transmission on 6 December 1974.

== Synopsis ==
When the platoon accidentally shoot and kill a loose turkey, a turkey dinner is organised.

== Plot ==
Mr. Blewitt has finished painting a wooden plaque on Captain Mainwaring's office door, and Mainwaring has finished writing a speech for an upcoming Rotary Club dinner. Mainwaring tells Sergeant Wilson that before a battle, their commander told them a joke. However, when Mainwaring attempts to cheer up his unusually quiet platoon with a joke about an Englishman, a Welshman and a Scotsman, it does not work, though when Cheeseman asks what happened to the Welshman, Wilson manages to make them laugh by saying "Maybe he didn't like semolina". Jones then asks Mainwaring if he and his section can speak to him in private.

Once in the office, Jones admits that he took his section for a quick drink in the Horse and Groom. Mainwaring is less than impressed, and is annoyed when he hears that they also stopped in the King's Head to stop Cheeseman shivering, and then the Goat and Compasses. Mainwaring is then amused to learn that Godfrey had begun to sing rather raucously, so he was taken into the Red Lion to sober up. The landlord had come up to Jones and had told him about something rustling in the haystack. Jones shot at the rustler, and was shocked to learn that it was a turkey—which is now plucked and stuffed in his refrigerator. Mainwaring is shocked, and insists that they pay Mr Boggis, a farmer at the North Berrington Turkey Farm, the only place where the turkey could have come from, for the loss of his turkey.

However, Mr Boggis is not there, and the men learn from a farm worker that he is at market day; however the farm worker is unwilling to accept money for the bird unless he is certain that one is missing. They attempt to count the birds, and discover after much chaos that no birds are missing. Therefore, Jones' section decides to hold a turkey dinner for the OAPs of Walmington-on-Sea. Mainwaring is delighted and decides to organise a Turkey Dinner General Purposes Committee, with himself as chairman, of course. Mrs Fox will cook the turkey, Mrs Pike will make the stuffing, and Mrs Cheeseman will do the gravy.

Everything goes well, until Mainwaring emerges from the office in his dinner suit for his appearance at the rotary dinner. Pike walks up to him with a plate in his hand, and accidentally gets gravy on Mainwaring's suit. Wilson uses blotting paper to get rid of the gravy, but ends up making a mess of Mainwaring's shirt, which Jones covers up with white enamel paint, which ends up on Mainwaring's dinner jacket.

A sling is the only answer to the problems, as it will not only hide the paint, but it will also make Mainwaring appear more brave at the dinner. However, Hodges comes bursting through the door, bumping into Pike, and spilling gravy all over his suit once again resulting in Mainwaring giving his trademark catchphrase, "You stupid boy!".

== Cast ==
- Arthur Lowe as Captain Mainwaring
- John Le Mesurier as Sergeant Wilson
- Clive Dunn as Lance Corporal Jones
- John Laurie as Private Frazer
- Arnold Ridley as Private Godfrey
- Ian Lavender as Private Pike
- Bill Pertwee as ARP Warden Hodges
- Talfryn Thomas as Private Cheeseman
- Edward Sinclair as The Verger
- Frank Williams as The Vicar
- Harold Bennett as Mr Blewett
- Pamela Cundell as Mrs Fox
- Janet Davies as Mrs Pike
- Olive Mercer as Mrs Yeatman
- Dave Butler as Farmhand
