= Mel Smith =

English actor and comedian (1952–2013)

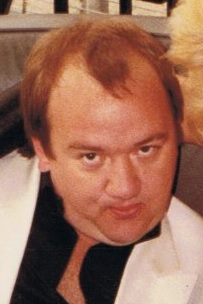
- Smith in the 1980s
- Born: Melvyn Kenneth Smith; 3 December 1952; Chiswick, London, England
- Died: 19 July 2013 (aged 60); London, England
- Occupations: Actor, comedian, filmmaker
- Notable work: Not the Nine O'Clock News; Alas Smith and Jones; Bean
- Spouse: Pamela Gay-Rees (m. 1988)

Comedy career
- Years active: 1979–2013
- Medium: Film, television
- Genres: Political satire, sketch comedy

Melvyn Kenneth Smith (3 December 1952 – 19 July 2013) was an English actor, comedian, and filmmaker. He worked on the sketch comedy shows Not the Nine O'Clock News and Alas Smith and Jones with his comedy partner, Griff Rhys Jones. Smith and Jones founded Talkback, which grew to be one of the United Kingdom's largest producers of television comedy and light entertainment programming.

== Early life ==
Smith's father, Kenneth, was born in Tow Law, County Durham, and worked at a coal mine during the Second World War looking after the pit ponies. After the war ended, he moved to London and married Smith's mother, whose parents owned a greengrocers in Chiswick. When the government legalised high street betting with the Betting and Gaming Act 1960, he turned the shop into the first betting shop in Chiswick.

Smith was born and brought up in Chiswick. He was educated at Hogarth Primary School, Chiswick and passed his 11-Plus examinations. He was also a keen sportsman and played for two seasons in the Hogarth School football team. The first season he played under the captaincy of Gerry Francis, the future English international and England captain. He applied and went to Latymer Upper School, a now private school in Hammersmith. He studied Experimental Psychology at New College, Oxford.

== Career ==
Whilst at Oxford University, Smith produced The Tempest, and performed at the Edinburgh Fringe with the Oxford University Dramatic Society. One year they shared a venue with the Cambridge Footlights, directed by John Lloyd. His extra-curricular activities while at university led to him joining the Royal Court Theatre production team in London, and then Bristol Old Vic. He was also associate director of Sheffield's Crucible Theatre for two years. Later, he directed a theatre production of Not in Front of the Audience.

John Lloyd later had the opportunity to develop the idea that became the satirical BBC television series Not the Nine O'Clock News. This was followed briefly by Smith and Goody (with Bob Goody) and then the comedy sketch series Alas Smith and Jones, co-starring Griff Rhys Jones, its title being a pun on the name of the American television series Alias Smith and Jones.

In 1982, he starred as the lead role in ITV drama Muck and Brass where he played Tom Craig, a ruthless property developer. In 1983 he played Crouch, the German's fiend's demented and slightly necrophiliac servant in the parodical comedy, Bullshot. In 1984, he appeared in the Minder episode "A Star Is Gorn" playing the character Cyril Ash, a ruthless and crooked record producer. He also guest-starred on The Goodies episode "Animals". At the end of the 1980s, he played the title role in the sitcom Colin's Sandwich (1988–1990), playing a British Rail employee with aspirations to be a writer.

In 1981, Smith and Griff Rhys Jones founded TalkBack Productions, a company that produced many of the most significant British comedy shows of the following decades, including Smack the Pony, Da Ali G Show, I'm Alan Partridge and Big Train. In 2000, the company was sold to Pearson for £62 million. Dressed as bobbies, Smith and Jones introduced Queen on stage at Live Aid in July 1985, with Smith removing his helmet before shouting into the microphone, "her majesty, Queen!"

Smith co-wrote and took the lead role in the space comedy Morons from Outer Space (1985), but the film failed to make much impact. His next cinema effort was better received as director of The Tall Guy (1989), giving Emma Thompson a major screen role. In America, perhaps his best-known film is Brain Donors, the 1992 update of the Marx Brothers film A Night at the Opera, starring Smith as a cheeky, opportunistic cab driver turned ballet promoter. Paramount Pictures considered this film the outstanding comedy of the year, but when the producers left Paramount for another studio, Paramount withdrew its support for the film.

In 1987, Smith recorded a single with Kim Wilde for Comic Relief: a cover of the Christmas song "Rockin' Around the Christmas Tree" with some additional comedy lines written by Smith and Jones. The pairing of Smith and Wilde was a comic allusion to the duo Mel and Kim. The song reached number three in the UK charts. The same year he appeared in The Princess Bride as the Albino.

Smith and Jones were reunited in 2005 for a review / revival of their earlier television series in The Smith and Jones Sketchbook. Smith joked: "Obviously, Griff's got more money than me so he came to work in a Rolls-Royce and I came on a bicycle. But it was great fun to do and we are firmly committed to doing something new together, because you don't chuck that sort of chemistry away. Of course, I'll have to pretend I like Restoration."

In August 2006, Smith returned to the theatre stage after some 20 years, appearing at the Edinburgh Fringe festival in Allegiance, Irish journalist and author Mary Kenny's play about Churchill's encounter with the Irish nationalist leader Michael Collins in 1921. The play initially caused some controversy, with Smith proposing to flout the Scottish ban on smoking in public places, but the scene was quickly adapted after gaining the required amount of publicity. The play was directed by Brian Gilbert and produced by Daniel Jewel. In 2006, he also appeared in Hustle as Benjamin Frasier, a pub landlord who was scammed by the Hustle team when his on-screen son Joey tried to launch a rap career.

In autumn 2006, Smith starred opposite Belinda Lang in a tour of a new comedy An Hour and a Half Late by French playwright Gérald Sibleyras, which was adapted by Smith. He then directed a West End revival of Charley's Aunt starring Stephen Tompkinson. From October 2007 to January 2008, he played the role of Wilbur Turnblad in the London production of Hairspray at the Shaftesbury Theatre.

== Personal life ==
Smith was married to Pamela (née Gay-Rees), a former model, who grew up in Easington and Durham. The couple had houses in St John's Wood, London, and the hamlet of Great Haseley, Oxfordshire, as well as a property in Barbados.

=== Health ===
Smith was hospitalised in 1999 with stomach ulcers, following an accidental overdose of over 50 Nurofen Plus tablets in one day, after previously admitting an addiction to sleeping pills. Smith said at the time that the pressures of film work were a contributing factor, along with a desperate need to ease the pain caused by gout. Partly as a result, he agreed to sell Talkback Productions. On 31 December 2008, Smith appeared on Celebrity Mastermind whilst suffering from severe pharyngitis.

== Death ==
On the morning of 19 July 2013, the London Ambulance Service was called to Smith's home in north-west London. Smith was confirmed dead by the ambulance crew, with a later post-mortem confirming death from a heart attack. He was 60 years old.

== Filmography ==
=== Film ===
Year	Title	Role	Notes
1980	Babylon	Alan	
1983	Bullshot	Crouch	
1983	Two Foolish Men	(unknown)	Short film
1983	Slayground	Terry Abbatt	
1985	Morons from Outer Space	Bernard	Also co-writer
1985	Restless Natives	Pyle	
1985	National Lampoon's European Vacation	Hotel Manager (London)	
1987	The Princess Bride	The Albino	
1989	The Tall Guy	Drunken Man	Uncredited role. Also director
1989	The Wolves of Willoughby Chase	Mr. Grimshaw	
1989	Wilt	Inspector Flint	
1992	Brain Donors	Rocco Melonchek	Also known as Lame Ducks
1994	Art Deco Detective	Porno Movie Director	
1994	Radioland Murders	–	Director
1996	Twelfth Night	Sir Toby Belch	
1997	Bean	–	Director
2001	High Heels and Low Lifes	Man at Train Station	Uncredited role. Also director
2003	Blackball	–	Director & executive producer
2005	Allegiance	Winston Churchill	
2011	My Angel	Uncle Richard	

=== Television ===
Year	Title	Role	Notes
1979–1982	Not the Nine O'Clock News	Various characters	Series 1–4; 28 episodes. Also co-writer
1980	Play for Today	Xan	Episode: "Dreams of Leaving"
1980	The Goodies	TV Talk Show Host	Episode: "Animals"
1980	Bloody Kids	Disco Doorman	Television film
1980	Smith and Goody	Various characters	7 episodes. Also co-writer
1981	Fundamental Frolics	Himself	Television Special
1981	The Kenny Everett Video Cassette	Various characters	Series 4; 2 episodes
1981	Omnibus	Himself - Presenter	Episode: "Parrots, Bees, Ducks and Finches"
1982	Muck and Brass	Tom Craig	Mini-series; 6 episodes
	The Snowman	Father Christmas (voice)	Short television film (20th Anniversary version); uncredited role
1982–1984	The Kenny Everett Television Show	Various characters	4 episodes
1984	Weekend in Wallop	Himself	Television film. Also writer
1984	Minder	Cyril Ash	Episode: "A Star Is Gorn"
1984	The Young Ones	Security Guard	Episode: "Bambi"
1984	Bookmark	John Self	Episode: #2.1
1984	Number One	Billy Evans	Television film
1984–1988	Alas Smith and Jones	Various characters	Series 1–4; 28 episodes. Also co-writer (10 episodes)
1985	Live Aid	Himself	Comedy sketch and intro to rock band Queen
1985	Saturday Live	Fred Dredd	Episode: "Pilot Show"
1986	Comedians Do It on Stage	Himself	Television Special. Also co-writer
1987	Filthy Rich & Catflap	Jumbo Whiffy	Episode: "A Death in the Family"
1987	The Grand Knockout Tournament	Himself - Team 4 Member	Television Special
1987–1988	The World According to Smith and Jones	Mel	Series 1 & 2; 12 episodes. Also co-writer
1988	Comic Relief	Himself	Television Special
1988–1990	Colin's Sandwich	Colin Watkins	Series 1 & 2; 12 episodes
1989	A Night of Comic Relief 2	Himself	Television Special
1989	Smith and Jones in Small Doses	Various characters	4 episodes
1989	Hysteria 2!	Himself	Television film
1989–1998	Smith and Jones	Various characters	Series 5–10; 36 episodes. Also co-writer (2 episodes)
1991	Jackanory	Storyteller	Episode: "Funny Business"
1991	Comic Relief	Himself	Television Special
1991	Father Christmas	Father Christmas (voice)	Short television film. UK version
1991	Amnesty International's Big 30	Himself	Television Special. Also co-writer
1994	Dream On	–	Director – episode: "From Here to Paternity"
1994	Milner	Stephen Milner	Television film
1995	Tough Target	–	Executive producer – episode: "Dana Feitler"
1995	Comic Relief: Behind the Nose	Himself	Television Special
1995	Omnibus	Himself - Presenter	Episode: "Some Interesting Facts About Peter Cook"
1996	A Gala Comedy Hour - Best of the Prince's Trust	Himself	Television Special. Also co-writer
2000	Too Much Sun	–	Executive producer – 6 episodes
2001	Comic Relief: Say Pants to Poverty	Colin	Television Special
2005	Comic Relief 2005	Himself	Television Special
2006	The Smith and Jones Sketchbook	Various characters	6 episodes. Also co-writer (1 episode)
2006	Agatha Christie's Marple	John Enderby	Episode: "The Sittaford Mystery"
2006	Hustle	Benny Frazier	Episode: "Price of Fame"
2007	Consenting Adults	David Maxwell Fyfe	Television film
2008	Celebrity Mastermind	Himself - Contender	Episode: #7.4
2010–2011	Rock & Chips	DI Thomas	Episodes: "Five Golden Rings" & "The Frog and the Pussycat"
2012	The Ones	Himself	Episode: "The One Griff Rhys Jones"
2013	Dancing on the Edge	Schlesinger	Mini-series; 5 episodes
