= Reg Bolton (clown) =

British actor and teacher

Reginald Ernest Bolton (13 November 1945 – 14 July 2006) was a clown, teacher, actor and writer. Bolton's 1987 book New Circus has been called "seminal," and influenced a generation of performers. He used the circus for education and community development, working with the children on the streets of the Craigmillar estate in Edinburgh.

== Life ==
Reg was born in Margate, England. He was educated at the University of Warwick, where he studied English and European literature. In 2004 he completed a PhD, Why Circus Works: how the values and structures of circus make it a significant developmental experience for young people, at Murdoch University in Perth, Western Australia.

He married Annie Stainer, a dancer, mime and clown, with whom he had two children, Jo and Sophie.

== Work ==
Reg worked tirelessly with children and communities both in the United Kingdom, and in Australia where he settled with his family in 1985. He owned and ran the Circus Shop, selling a range of circus equipment such as juggling gear and unicycles. He was a pioneer in the area of educational community circuses.

He wrote and produced many works, including:

- 1983 Circus in a suitcase. A practical manual. New York
- 1987 New circus. A world survey. London. Occasional journal Suitcase Circus News.
- 1988 Videos Circus skills and School circus
- 1992 Video Safe circus
- 1995-98 Regular columnist for Laugh-Makers (USA) and Pro-Circus (Australia)
- 1996-04 Occasional contributor to Spectacle
- 1998 Showtime. Best-selling children's book, (Premier's Book Award, 2000)
- 1999 Paper on Circus as Education in Australasian Drama Studies
- 2001 Keynote Speaker, Festival of American Youth Circus Organisation, Sarasota, Florida. Theme: Circus to save the world.
- 2002 Intensity in tent city. Leeds University, England
- 2003 Keynote Speaker, International Clowns Symposium, Weston super Mare, England. Clown abuse.
- 2003 Article: 'The Philosopher on the Flying Trapeze'. Discourse, San Francisco.
- 2003 The wisdom of clowns
- 2004 PhD paper: Why Circus Works: how the values and structure of circus make it a significant developmental experience for young people

== Death ==
Reg died unexpectedly while working in Kununurra, Western Australia at the Agricultural Show, "doing what he did best, putting on a great show". His funeral was held at St George's Cathedral in Perth, Western Australia on 29 July 2006, with a celebration of his life held at the Camelot Theatre, Mosman Park on 30 July 2006.
