= Annie Stainer =

English mime and clown (1945–2025)

- Stainer in the 1970s
- Born: 29 September 1945; Shaftesbury, Dorset, England
- Died: 31 May 2025 (aged 79)
- Occupation: Performance artist

Annie Stainer (29 September 1945 – 31 May 2025) was an English mime, clown, and dancer. She was known for her solo performances during the 1970s and 1980s, including a series of three related mime-and-dance works referred to as the Annie Stainer trilogy.

== Early life and education ==
Stainer was born on 29 September 1945 in Shaftesbury, Dorset, England, and was raised in Mere, Wiltshire, where her parents Edna and Ron were bakers. She attended Shaftesbury grammar school and took ballet classes as a child, where her teacher criticised her for her "broken arms," which would make her "appear to fly, by delicately and continuously undulating her arms as if they were remarkable wings," something that would later be featured in her solo work as an adult. In 1967, she went to the University of Warwick to study French, where she met her collaborator and husband Reg Bolton. She went on to study at the London School of Contemporary Dance in 1968 before studying mime with Etienne Decroux completing in 1971.

== Career ==
In the early 1970s, Stainer met David Bowie through the choreographer Lindsay Kemp who taught Bowie mime in the 1960s. In 1972, Stainer appeared in a film shot by the photographer Mick Rock for Bowie's song "John, I'm Only Dancing", which includes the line "Well, Annie's pretty neat, she always eats her meat." The line is assigned to her as she appeared in the accompanying video. She also performed on stage with Bowie, in his Ziggy Stardust persona, during concerts at the Rainbow Theatre in London in August 1972. At the shows, she performed with a group called the Astronettes in exotic make up and wearing a fishnet bodystocking. During the song "Lady Stardust" she and her fellow dancers put on Bowie masks.

Stainer's work included playing the albatross in The Rime of the Ancient Mariner in 1977 which was awarded a Fringe First award in Edinburgh. She is best known for the Annie Stainer trilogy, three mime and dance performances that had a mutual theme. These began with a 1973 performance based around the first wife of Adam who is said to be Lilith. The Legend of Lilith was performed at the Cathedral of St. John the Divine in New York.

In 1985, the family moved to Perth where Stainer and her husband worked for the Western Australian Academy of Performing Arts (WAAPA) and ran a circus shop. In 1988 she performed her complete trilogy in Perth which consisted of The Rime of the Ancient Mariner, Moon from 1975, and the final piece Changing Woman which was first performed in Glasgow in 1984. She was the Head of Movement at WAAPA for six years.

In 2002, Stainer and her daughter established the Total Theatre school of physical theatre at the Camelot theatre in Perth. It combined circus, dance, theatre, and cabaret. Subjects taught there including Shakespeare, classical Chinese dance, and unicycle riding lessons. It produced more than 30 original works until its closure in 2012.

== Personal life and death ==
Stainer's husband and collaborator Reg Bolton died in 2006. They had two children, Jo and Sophie. Stainer died of pneumonia on 31 May 2025.
