= The Love of Three Oranges (Dad's Army) =

- Dad's Army episode
- Episode no.: Series 8 Episode 8
- Directed by: David Croft
- Story by: Jimmy Perry and David Croft
- Original air date: 26 December 1976
- Running time: 30 minutes

Episode chronology
← Previous "My Brother and I"	Next → "Wake Up Walmington"

"The Love of Three Oranges" is the third Christmas episode of the British comedy series Dad's Army. It was originally transmitted on 26 December 1976.

== Synopsis ==
A church bazaar is organised for the "Comforts for the Troops Fund". Hodges intends to auction three oranges, and Mainwaring is determined to get hold of one for Mrs Mainwaring.

== Plot ==
The platoon are parading in their snow camouflage suits so they can blend in with the snow, if there was any. Jones' glasses are completely white except for two small, dark holes in the middle because he has highly coloured eyes. He also has cotton wool pushed up his nostrils, because he claims that his nostrils flare. Pike is wearing a white sheet over his head because his mother would not let him put whitewash on his face. Frazer is dressed in his mother's wedding dress, as it was all he could find, and Godfrey is wearing a Pierrot costume he wore, complete with pompoms, for the Army and Navy Stores Christmas party, where they made up a troupe called the Gay Gondoliers.

The Vicar and the Verger interrupt the parade and inform Mainwaring of a church bazaar they are holding for the Comforts for the Troops Fund. Mainwaring naturally takes charge and forms a small executive committee. Godfrey will provide chutney and homemade wine, Frazer will draw silhouettes, Mrs Pike will run a jumble sale, Mrs Fox will perform fortune-telling in a gypsy tent, Mrs Mainwaring will provide lampshades, Mrs Yeatman will organise the tombola, and Jones will auction a monster brawn. Hodges shoves his oar in by declaring he will auction three oranges, much to the committee's surprise.

The bazaar opens, but Mrs Mainwaring's lampshade stall is empty. The reason, as Mainwaring tells Wilson, is that Mrs Mainwaring had an unfortunate incident with the bath (he had recently enamelled it, and the enamel paint had not dried and came off in one long strip, making an enamel skirt around her as she prepared to take a bath), and she will not be coming. Mainwaring admits to Wilson that he would only be embarrassed by the lampshades anyway, but it turns out that Pike picked them up from Mainwaring's house. Frazer has started on his silhouettes, and makes a rather embarrassing one of Mainwaring, who is most annoyed.

Every so often, Jones and Pike carry Jones's brawn into the yard, as it is melting in the heat, and back in again. Mainwaring tries to win a bottle of whisky from the tombola stall but loses out to the Vicar. When he notices the town clerk and some of his men drunk, he confronts Godfrey, who admits that everybody has been tasting the wine but nobody is buying it. A despatch rider arrives with a message but, when he leaves, his motorbike runs over Jones' brawn, making it impossible to auction. Mainwaring also finds that Sponge is selling the lampshades as funny hats.

Just as Hodges announces the auction of the oranges, Mainwaring tells Wilson that he must get one of the oranges for Mrs Mainwaring. The Verger overhears and warns Hodges, who resolves to stop Mainwaring. The first orange is sold for one shilling to Mrs Yeatman, before Mainwaring had finished bidding. The second orange is withdrawn from the sale for (according to Hodges) not reaching its unstated reserve price. Wilson tells Pike to buy the last orange for Mainwaring. As they end up bidding against each other (unknowingly), the orange eventually sells for an enormous ten shillings.

Mainwaring brings Jones' section into the office. Mrs Mainwaring rings and tells Pike that she has gone to stay with her sister for the weekend. Pike tells her about the orange, but she promptly slams the phone down. Mainwaring therefore decides to share the orange with Wilson and Jones' section. Suddenly Hodges comes bursting in and tells Mainwaring that they will find the orange rather bitter as it is intended for use in making marmalade.

== Cast ==
- Arthur Lowe as Captain Mainwaring
- John Le Mesurier as Sergeant Wilson
- Clive Dunn as Lance Corporal Jones
- John Laurie as Private Frazer
- Arnold Ridley as Private Godfrey
- Ian Lavender as Private Pike
- Bill Pertwee as ARP Warden Hodges
- Edward Sinclair as The Verger
- Frank Williams as The Vicar
- Pamela Cundell as Mrs Fox
- Janet Davies as Mrs Pike
- Olive Mercer as Mrs Yeatman
- Joan Cooper as Dolly
- Eric Longworth as Claude Gordon, the Town Clerk
- Colin Bean as Private Sponge

== Notes ==
1. The episode must be set prior to 25 June 1941, as Mainwaring refers to "our Finnish allies". In the early part of the war the Soviet Union, loosely allied to Germany under the Molotov–Ribbentrop Pact, attacked Finland in the Winter War of 1939-1940. As there was little fighting going on in the west that winter (the Phoney War) there was great sympathy for Finland in the UK. On 25 June 1941, the UK declared war on Finland following Finland's invasion of the Soviet Union along with Germany and her allies (see Continuation War and Operation Barbarossa).
2. No new series of Dad's Army was made in 1976 as the cast were touring the stage version of the show across the UK, resulting in a Christmas Special being produced instead. This would be the first year since 1971 (when the first feature film of the series was made) that no new series of the show would be produced and transmitted.
