= Not the Nine O'Clock News =

British television comedy sketch show (1979–1982)

- DVD cover. Left to right: Mel Smith, Pamela Stephenson, Rowan Atkinson, and Griff Rhys Jones.
- Created by: John Lloyd
- Directed by: Bill Wilson (series 1–3); Geoff Posner (series 4)
- Starring: Rowan Atkinson; Pamela Stephenson; Mel Smith; Griff Rhys Jones (recurring, series 1; main cast, series 2–4); Chris Langham (series 1)
- Composer: Howard Goodall
- Country of origin: United Kingdom
- Original language: English
- No. of series: 4
- No. of episodes: 27

Production
- Producers: John Lloyd; Sean Hardie
- Running time: 25 minutes

Original release
- Network: BBC2
- Release: 16 October 1979 – 8 March 1982

Related
- Alas Smith and Jones

Not the Nine O'Clock News is a British television sketch comedy show that was broadcast on BBC2 from 16 October 1979 to 8 March 1982. Originally shown as a comedy alternative to the Nine O'Clock News on BBC1, the show features satirical sketches on news stories and popular culture of the early 1980s, as well as parody songs, comedy sketches, re-edited videos, and spoof television formats. The programme features Rowan Atkinson, Pamela Stephenson, Mel Smith, and Griff Rhys Jones, as well as Chris Langham in the first series.

== Format ==
The format was a deliberate departure from the stream-of-consciousness comedy pioneered by Monty Python's Flying Circus, returning to a more conventional sketch format. Sketches were mostly self-contained, lasting from a few seconds to a few minutes, and often had a degree of naturalism in performance. The series launched the careers of several high-profile actors and writers, and also led to other comedic series including Blackadder and Alas Smith and Jones.

The series benefited from video editing and recording techniques. The pace was enhanced by jump-cutting between library clips, usually of politicians, royalty, or celebrities. Prime Minister Margaret Thatcher complained when, by adroit image editing, the programme implied she had crashed a car. Effects used in pop videos, provided by the Quantel Paintbox, were often a highlight of the musical numbers.

== History ==
=== Background ===
Not the Nine O'Clock News was produced by John Lloyd. Lloyd pitched the idea to the heads of BBC Comedy and Light Entertainment and was given a six-episode series on condition that he collaborate with Sean Hardie, who had worked in current affairs at the BBC.

Initially, Lloyd and Hardie were considering doing a lampoon of current affairs programmes à la The Frost Report, with Rowan Atkinson portraying an old-fashioned host attacking liberal and/or modern trends. The programme was to be called Sacred Cows, but the news programme was chosen because of its larger number of sources. The name of the series derived from its scheduling, as it originally aired on BBC2 at the same time as the Nine O'Clock News on BBC1.

=== Aborted pilot episode ===
Aside from Atkinson, the original cast comprised Christopher Godwin, John Gorman, Chris Langham, Willoughby Goddard, and Jonathan Hyde, and the first episode of a planned series was scheduled for 2 April 1979; this also featured Chris Emmett (impersonating Denis Healey), and Robert Llewelyn (impersonating Bob Hope).

As the programme was originally scheduled to air in the time slot occupied by Fawlty Towers, John Cleese was to have introduced the first episode in a sketch referring to a technicians' strike in progress at the time that hindered the production of the series, explaining (in character as Basil Fawlty) that there was no programme that week, so a "tatty revue" would be broadcast instead. However, the 1979 general election intervened, and the programme was pulled as being too political, being replaced with a repeat of the American sitcom Rhoda.

The sketch with Cleese was broadcast later that year when the final episode of Fawlty Towers went out during the broadcast run of the first series of Not The Nine O'Clock News, though the significance of the sketch was lost to some degree. This link is included on the Region 2 DVD boxset of Fawlty Towers. Basil's waiter Manuel, played by Andrew Sachs, also appeared at the end of the unaired episode, trying to comprehend a joke about the Ayatollah's contact lenses.

Other sketches of the unaired pilot episode were also lifted or remade on episodes throughout the first series. Healey's and Hope's impressions were achieved by the use of "talking head" puppets, which in the mid-1980s would become a characteristic staple of Spitting Image, produced by Lloyd in its early series.

=== In production ===
Lloyd and Hardie decided to re-cast the series, retaining Langham and Atkinson. They wanted to bring in a woman, but Victoria Wood turned the programme down. Lloyd met Pamela Stephenson at a party, and she agreed to join. Atkinson, Langham, and Stephenson were joined by Mel Smith, who was scheduled to work on the pilot, but declined after reading the script (he called the finished pilot in retrospect "the worst half hour of TV" that he had ever seen). The first series was criticised for being "a poor mix of stand up, and a mild portion of sketches" and newspaper reviews referred to it as "extremely offensive" and that it "should not be allowed on TV". Ratings were dismal as well: the first episode had fewer than a million viewers.

However, the network controller reportedly liked the programme so much that a second series of seven episodes was commissioned, also helped by budgetary cuts at BBC, which were repeatedly lampooned in the second series' premiere episode, entitled "The Outrageously Expensive Not the Nine O'Clock News". Such cuts also forced the show to drastically reduce the use of outside scenes (which were recorded on film) as well as minor players. The shock value prominent during the first season was also toned down in favour of a more "offbeat" tone.

In February 1980, in between series 1 and series 2 of Not the Nine O'Clock News, Mel Smith appeared as a news reader named "Reginald Bowes and Cat" in the Goodies episode "Animals". His segment of the show was preceded by the caption "Not the News at Ten".

For the second series, Langham was replaced by Griff Rhys-Jones, who had already been a regular player during the first series, aside from having directed the radio programme The Atkinson People. The second series of Not the Nine O’Clock News won the Silver Rose at the Montreux Festival and a BAFTA Award for Best Light Entertainment Programme in 1982. The show's later series achieved improved ratings and became critically acclaimed.

Not the Nine O'Clock News became a stage production in Oxford and London in 1982, but the main performers decided to end the project while it was a success: Stephenson began a Hollywood film career, Atkinson recorded the first series of Blackadder (also produced by John Lloyd) in 1983, and Smith and Jones became a double act in Alas Smith and Jones. An American adaptation, Not Necessarily the News ran for seven years, from 1983 to 1990 on the Home Box Office cable television channel.

=== Content ===
Satire was a key theme in the series' comedy. For example, one spoof news element might include a routine announcement that NASA had once again announced a delay in the launch of its Space Shuttle owing to technical difficulties, as the screen showed the shuttle on its launch pad with oxygen streaming off the tanks, overlaid with the sound of a car engine turning over but not starting. An opening graphic featured the same blue screen and white analogue clock ticking down to 9:00 p.m. as preceded the Nine O'Clock News, followed by an announcement of the time in a similar voice and, in parody, the announcement that this was "definitely not the Nine O'Clock News". Skits could include scenes such as a group of rural Americans at a barbecue singing several minutes of comically implausible songs like "I'm prepared to believe that Nixon wasn't a crook; I'm prepared to believe Love Story's a readable book..." and finally concluding, "I believe that the devil is ready to repent; – but I can't believe Ronald Reagan is president."

A well-known sketch from the second season (1980) features Mel Smith as Professor Timothy Fielding, who brought a gorilla named Gerald (played by Atkinson) to a TV studio for an interview. Fielding claims that he trained the ape to learn to speak. As the sketch progresses, it turns out that Gerald is amazingly articulate and obviously smarter than Fielding. This leads to a classic exchange, where Fielding claims: "When I caught Gerald in '68 he was completely wild.", whereupon Gerald interrupts: "Wild? I was absolutely livid!".

=== Legacy ===
The programme is credited with bringing alternative comedy to British television: Lloyd once commented he wanted to do a "modern, working-class" comedy in contrast to other series of the time, such as The Two Ronnies, as well as attempting to replicate the satire boom of the early 1960s that launched the careers of John Cleese, Dudley Moore, Eric Idle, Tim Brooke-Taylor and others. This also happened at a time that the magazine National Lampoon, The Second City troupes and Saturday Night Live became showcases of alternative comedy in North America.

In 2005, Atkinson, Smith, Stephenson, Langham, and producer Lloyd reunited to talk to Sue MacGregor about the series. Langham's departure was touched upon, with Lloyd seeming to take the blame, though Atkinson had campaigned for Langham to be kept in the cast (Langham refused to speak to his former cast mates for several years after he was fired, until appearing as a regular on Smith and Jones in the 1990s). The Reunion was broadcast on Radio 4 on 31 July 2005.

A documentary featuring the cast reminiscing about the making of the programme was shown on BBC Two on 28 December 2009, before one of the 1995 compilation shows was aired (despite a "complete episode" being billed in television listings). The documentary was repeated on 3 August 2013, just over two weeks after the death of Mel Smith.

In 2025, Griff Rhys Jones gave his opinion that the series was not respected enough by the BBC, and risks being forgotten as a ground-breaking comedy show, as it is never repeated. Jones claimed that the BBC don't repeat it because they don't want to pay him and the writers.

== Crew ==
The main writers included Colin Bostock-Smith, Andy Hamilton, Peter Brewis, Richard Curtis, and Clive Anderson. However, the producers accepted scripts for sketches from a wide range of writers (including a then-undergraduate Stephen Fry), and ensured the programme remained topical by recording sketches only days before broadcast. Howard Goodall (subsequently composer of the theme music for Blackadder, Red Dwarf, and The Vicar of Dibley) was musical director.

== Episodes ==
A total of 27 episodes of 25–30-minute duration were broadcast over four series.

Series 1 had been due to start on 2 April 1979, but was postponed due to a general election being called for 3 May, with the programme being deemed "too political".

Series	Episodes	Originally released	
Series	Episodes	First released	Last released
1	6	16 October 1979	20 November 1979
2	7	31 March 1980	12 May 1980
3	8	27 October 1980	15 December 1980
4	6	1 February 1982	8 March 1982

=== Series 1 (1979) ===
No. overall	No. in season	Title	Original release date
1	1	"Kenny Everett in Not the Nine O'Clock News"	16 October 1979
2	2	"Episode 2"	23 October 1979
3	3	"Episode 3"	30 October 1979
4	4	"Episode 4"	6 November 1979
5	5	"Not the Nine O'Clock News Christmas Party"	13 November 1979
6	6	"Episode 6"	20 November 1979

=== Series 2 (1980) ===
No. overall	No. in season	Title	Original release date
7	1	"The Outrageously Expensive Not the Nine O'Clock News"	31 March 1980
8	2	"Episode 2"	7 April 1980
9	3	"Don't Get Your Vicars in a Twist"	14 April 1980
10	4	"International Darts"	21 April 1980
11	5	"Episode 5"	28 April 1980
12	6	"Episode 6"	5 May 1980
13	7	"Death Lasers of Kazaan"	12 May 1980

=== Series 3 (1980) ===
No. overall	No. in season	Title	Original release date
14	1	"Not the Nine O'Clock in the Morning News"	27 October 1980
15	2	"Election Special"	3 November 1980
16	3	"Miss World 1980"	10 November 1980
17	4	"Nationwide"	17 November 1980
18	5	"Episode 5"	24 November 1980
19	6	"Episode 6"	1 December 1980
20	7	"The Royal Command Performance of Not the Nine O'Clock News"	8 December 1980
21	8	"Episode 8"	15 December 1980

=== Series 4 (1982) ===
No. overall	No. in season	Title	Original release date
22	1	"Episode 1"	1 February 1982
23	2	"Episode 2"	8 February 1982
24	3	"Ní Se Seo An Nuacht Ag A Naoi Chlog"	15 February 1982
25	4	"Episode 4"	22 February 1982
26	5	"Made in Wales"	1 March 1982
27	6	"Shame"	8 March 1982

=== Specials ===
1. Not the Least of Not the Nine O'Clock News (28 December 1979; Christmas Special, compilation of material from Series 1)
2. The Best Of Not the Nine O'Clock News (9 September 1980; Compilation of material from Series 2)
3. 25 Years Of Not the Nine O'Clock News (16 September 1980; Compilation of material from Series 2)
4. Not The Lot of Not the Nine O'Clock News (23 September 1980; Compilation of material from Series 2)
5. Not The Nine O'Clock Christmas: Write Your Own (30 December 1980; Christmas Special, compilation of material from Series 3)
6. Not Another Not the Nine O'Clock News (9 October 1981; Compilation of material from Series 1, 2, and 3)
7. An Eighth Chance to See Not the Nine O'Clock News (16 October 1981; Compilation of material from Series 1, 2, and 3)
8. The Last of the Summer Repeats (23 October 1981; Compilation of material from Series 1, 2, and 3)
9. Not the World Cup (19 June 1982; Compilation of material from Series 4)
10. Not the Nine O'Clock News (7, 14 & 28 September 1983; 3 compilations of material from Series 4)
11. Not the Nine O'Clock News (27 October – 15 December 1995; 8 compilations)

Since 1995, the eight re-cut and condensed (to make it "faster and funnier than ever") episodes assembled that year have been used for repeats in place of the original broadcast episodes. This is primarily because the original episodes in their entirety lampooned events that were in the news at the time. These eight compilations are also used for the show's video and DVD releases since 1995.

== Commercial releases ==
=== Video and DVD ===
Two VHS releases of the series, entitled The Gorilla Kinda Lingers and Nice Video, Shame about the Hedgehog, appeared in 1995. Between them, they include the eight "best of" compilation episodes that were assembled and broadcast that year.

In August 2003, The Gorilla Kinda Lingers was released on DVD as The Best of Not the Nine O'Clock News: Volume One, while Nice Video, Shame about the Hedgehog followed on DVD in August 2004 as The Best of Not the Nine O'Clock News: Volume Two. In North America, the two volumes are available as one DVD, The Best of Not the Nine O'Clock News, issued in March 2006.

=== Records ===
Three vinyl albums were released at the time the series was screening, entitled Not the Nine O'Clock News, Hedgehog Sandwich, and The Memory Kinda Lingers. These albums were very successful, with the first two both reaching the top ten of the UK albums chart, a rare feat for a spoken word album. Hedgehog Sandwich also peaked at number 89 in Australia.

The original version of The Memory Kinda Lingers is a double LP. The second disc is titled Not in Front of the Audience and is a live recording of the cast's stage production. Hedgehog Sandwich and the first disc of The Memory Kinda Lingers were later combined on a BBC double-length cassette and double-CD set.

"The Ayatollah Song" b/w "Gob on You" (as featured in the TV show) and "I Like Trucking" b/w "Supa Dupa" were also released as singles.

The 1980 single "Typing Pool" by 'Pam and the Paper Clips' (EMI 5015), is variously ascribed to Pamela Stephenson and NtNON. It was written by Roger and Nigel Planer, who were among the show's many writers.

=== Books and miscellaneous ===
Three books were released to tie in with the series: Not! The Nine O'Clock News, a collection of classic material rewritten and restructured as a parody of the short-lived magazine Now!; Not the Royal Wedding (the royal wedding in question being the marriage of Charles and Diana); and Not the General Election, a tie-in with the 1983 general election. The first was reprinted in 1995 as Not for Sale. Not the Royal Wedding was promoted by a little-known radio spin-off, Not the Nuptials, transmitted on BBC Radio 1. The same station had also previously produced a behind-the-scenes documentary on Not the Nine O'Clock News as part of their magazine series Studio B15.

Two "page-a-day" tear-off calendars, edited by John Lloyd and containing several contributions from Douglas Adams, were released in the early 1980s (Not 1982 and Not 1983). Also published around this time was a spoof Orwellian edition of The Times newspaper, Not the 1984 Times, which – although widely assumed to be – was not connected to the series.

== See also ==
- Not Necessarily the News
- Drop the Dead Donkey
