= Alas Smith and Jones =

British television comedy series

- Title card from 1995–1998, with Mel Smith on the left and Griff Rhys Jones on the right.
- Also known as: Smith and Jones
- Genre: Sketch comedy
- Starring: Mel Smith; Griff Rhys Jones; Chris Langham; Rowan Atkinson (Guest in Series 1 Episode 1 and Series 10 Episode 4)
- Country of origin: United Kingdom
- Original language: English
- No. of series: 10
- No. of episodes: 62

Production
- Running time: 30 minutes; per normal episode
- Production companies: BBC; TalkBack

Original release
- Network: BBC2 (1984–88); BBC1 (1989–1998)
- Release: 31 January 1984 – 14 October 1998

Related
- Not the Nine O'Clock News

Alas Smith and Jones is a British comedy sketch television series starring Mel Smith and Griff Rhys Jones that originally ran for four series and two Christmas specials on BBC2 from 1984 to 1988, and then as Smith and Jones for six series on BBC1 from 1989 to 1998. A spin-off from Not the Nine O'Clock News, the show had a brief run in the United States on A&E and PBS in the late 1980s, as well as on CBS in the early 1990s during their late-night block.

== History ==
=== Background ===
The show's development came after Not the Nine O'Clock News ended in 1982. Rowan Atkinson and Pamela Stephenson pursued their solo careers, while Mel Smith and Griff Rhys Jones decided to form a double act.

Their first appearance as a duo was in a short sketch in the BBC1 comedy special The Funny Side of Christmas in 1982, in which Jones played a stranger who annoyed hospital patient Smith to the extent that Smith's character walked out in rage, leaving Jones's character to enjoy Smith's Christmas gifts.

The BBC offered the pair their own show, with much of the material written by themselves with help from a large team of writers. The title is a pun on the American television series Alias Smith and Jones.

=== Format ===
The show shared several script writers with Not the Nine O'Clock News including Clive Anderson and Colin Bostock-Smith. It used taboo-breaking material, bad language, sketches in questionable taste, and included head-to-head dialogues in the Pete and Dud mould with Smith the know-all idiot and Jones the know-nothing idiot. The head-to-head format was also used by Smith and Jones in a series of commercials. Cast regulars Chris Langham and Andy Hamilton helped keep the show to a consistently high standard.

=== TalkBack ===
Series 4 in 1987 was the final series to be produced solely by the BBC, and the last series to be broadcast on BBC2. The 1987 Christmas special, The Homemade Xmas Video, was one of the first shows to be produced for the BBC by an independent production company – TalkBack – of which Smith and Jones were founding directors. TalkBack produced series 5 for the BBC in 1989, which was broadcast on BBC1 and dropped "Alas" from the title.

In 2000 Smith and Jones sold TalkBack to Pearson Television, then owners of Thames Television, for £62 million. Pearson PLC sold Pearson Television to CLT-UFA in 2001 to form the RTL Group. Pearson Television was renamed FremantleMedia and its UK division took the Thames Television name. The operational departments of TalkBack and Thames were merged to form Talkback Thames in 2003; initially each brand continued to be used on screen, but eventually all productions used the Talkback Thames name. In 2011 individual brand names returned and Talkback is once again used solely for comedy productions.

== Episode guide ==
The show ran for ten series across 14 years, each comprising six 30-minute episodes.

=== Alas Smith and Jones (BBC2) ===
- Series 1: 31 January 1984 – 6 March 1984
- Series 2: 31 October 1985 – 5 December 1985
- Series 3: 18 September 1986 – 23 October 1986
- Series 4: 15 October 1987 – 26 November 1987
- The Homemade Xmas Video: Christmas Special 1987 (23 December)
- Alas Sage and Onion: Christmas Special 1988 (21 December)

=== Smith and Jones (BBC1) ===
- Series 5: 16 November 1989 – 28 December 1989
- Series 6: 22 November 1990 – 3 January 1991
- Series 7: 22 October 1992 – 3 December 1992
- Series 8: 6 September 1995 – 18 October 1995
- Series 9: 19 June 1997 – 24 July 1997
- Series 10: 9 September 1998 – 14 October 1998

== The World According to Smith and Jones (1987–1988) ==
In early 1987, between series 3 and 4 of Alas…, Smith and Jones produced a six-part series for London Weekend Television called The World According to Smith and Jones. Written by many of the regular writers from the duo's previous series, this was a mock-historical documentary show, hosted by the duo from behind standard presenter's desks (somewhat in the style of the closing sequence of The Two Ronnies) and attempting to study specific periods of history via clips from old (and preferably obscure) black-and-white films. The show included a running joke in which Jones would identify a character resembling Smith within the footage of each episode, and then claim that it was one of Smith's many ancestors.

The World According to Smith and Jones received average reviews and was less well-received than Smith and Jones' BBC series. When Alas Smith and Jones returned for its own fourth series later in 1987, one of the sketches was a vicious parody of The World According to Smith and Jones under the title of A Collection of Old Jokes According to Smith and Jones. The first series was repeated once in late 1987.

Despite the criticism (and the apparently ambivalent opinion of its stars towards the programme), The World According to Smith and Jones returned for a second six-part series in 1988, with the mock-historical format altered in favour of each episode concentrating on a single topic (medicine, war, law, education, arts and science). Unlike the first series, this series was not repeated and there were no further episodes of the show. To date, it has not been re-released on DVD or via streaming.

== Smith and Jones in Small Doses (1989) ==
Smith and Jones in Small Doses was a series of four comedy playlets shown on BBC2 from 19 October 1989 to 9 November 1989, each written by a different comedian or screenwriter. It was the last show the duo made for BBC2, broadcast shortly before the fifth series of Smith and Jones (the first shown on BBC1).

1. The Whole Hog by Graeme Garden: 19 October 1989
2. The Boat People by Griff Rhys Jones: 26 October 1989
3. Second Thoughts by Anthony Minghella: 2 November 1989
4. The Waiting Room by John Mortimer: 9 November 1989

The series was repeated a year later on BBC2 from 25 October 1990 to 15 November 1990, albeit in a completely different order (The Boat People, The Whole Hog, The Waiting Room, Second Thoughts).

== The Smith and Jones Sketchbook (2006) ==
Following on from the success of The Two Ronnies Sketchbook the previous year, Smith and Jones returned in 2006 with The Smith and Jones Sketchbook.

The six-part series consisted primarily of Smith and Jones introducing highlights from the show's original run from 1984 to 1998. Some of the classic head-to-head sketches were updated with new material written especially for the programme.

The series was broadcast on BBC One on Friday nights at 9:30 p.m., from 21 April 2006 to 26 May 2006. It has not been repeated since its original broadcast or released commercially.

== Commercial releases ==
In 1991, a compilation of footage from series 5 and 6 was compiled for a VHS release—simply titled Smith and Jones. The second video released in 1993 featured footage from series 1 to 4, particularly from the second series. A compilation DVD release The Best of Smith and Jones was scheduled for 8 August 2005 by the BBC, but never appeared.

In October 2009, FremantleMedia released a two-disc set titled At Last Smith and Jones - Volume 1. This contained compilations of the first four series, as well as the two Christmas specials, "The Homemade Xmas Video" and "Alas Sage and Onion". The first of these has a scene cut, presumably for music clearance reasons, while the latter has an additional scene, that was removed from the initial broadcast. The scene involves a plane crash, and the special was first broadcast mere hours after the 1988 Lockerbie bombing.

The set includes the complete 1989 series Smith and Jones in Small Doses. Volume 2 was prepared at the same time as the first release, featuring newly-edited highlights episodes from the later Smith and Jones era plus the unbroadcast sitcom pilot Three Flights Up, but has yet to see release.

Tie-in books included The Smith and Jones World Atlas (a humorous gazetteer of the world's countries), Janet Lives With Mel and Griff, and The Lavishly Tooled Smith and Jones Instant Coffee Table Book (co-written with Clive Anderson), which was designed to look as if it could be made into a coffee table.
