= Superworm (book) =

2012 children's book by Julia Donaldson

- Author: Julia Donaldson
- Illustrator: Axel Scheffler
- Cover artist: Axel Scheffler
- Language: English
- Genre: Children's literature
- Set in: United Kingdom
- Publisher: Alison Green Books
- Publication date: 6 September 2012
- Publication place: United Kingdom
- Media type: Print (Hardback, paperback)
- Pages: 30
- Awards: Red House Award; Buxtehuder Kälbchen Picture Book Prize
- ISBN: 978-1-4071-3204-4
- OCLC: 794815836
- Followed by: The Paper Dolls
- Website: www.juliadonaldson.co.uk

Superworm is a children's book written by British writer Julia Donaldson, illustrated by German illustrator Axel Scheffler, and published by Alison Green Books. The story follows a worm who acts as a superhero for insects and animals and gets captured by a lizard and a crow and is later saved by those he helped.

It was first published in 2012 in the United Kingdom by Alison Green Books. The book was adapted into a film in 2021, which starred actors Olivia Colman and Matt Smith. Superworm won two major awards, the Red House Award (2014) and the Buxtehuder Kälbchen Picture Book Prize (2013). The Paper Dolls was published after Superworm in October 2012.

== Authors ==
Julia Donaldson is a British writer and playwright from Hampstead, London, England, born on 16 September with her younger sister. Before writing Superworm, she wrote The Gruffalo, Room on the Broom, Zog, and The Gruffalo's Child. She attended the University of Bristol, studying drama and French; she graduated with a 2:1 honours degree. She was married to Malcolm Donaldson until his death in 2024.

Axel Scheffler is a German illustrator and animator born in Hamburg, West Germany. He is known for working alongside Donaldson in many works, including Superworm. Scheffler attended Bath Academy of Art, studying the history of art, he later dropped out.

== Plot ==
A super-long, super-strong worm referred to as "Superworm" acts as a superhero, helping local insects and animals. He rescues a toad from a road and helps beetles by acting as a skipping rope. He entertains bees who are bored by playing new games with them. A "Wicked Wizard Lizard" wants to take advantage of Superworm's gifts and orders a crow, the lizard's grim black bird servant, to capture him.

The crow flies down and captures Superworm, and he is brought back to the lizard, who then makes him dig for treasure to increase her wealth. Other animals, including snails, bees, spiders, and toads, work together to save Superworm. The snails eat a magic flower, and the spiders form a web in which the lizard gets caught in. The bees fly in, pick up the captured lizard, and drop her into a garbage dump. They then regroup and save Superworm. Once back home, they celebrate the victory and their friendship.

== Issues ==
In December of 2021 Donaldson revealed that during the writing of the book, a line was cut after an awkward conversation with her publisher, Alison Green, about the line that read, “Superworm is long and pink, Superworm can grow and shrink.”, the line was replaced with "Superworm is super-long, Superworm is super-strong.”

== Legacy and adaptations ==
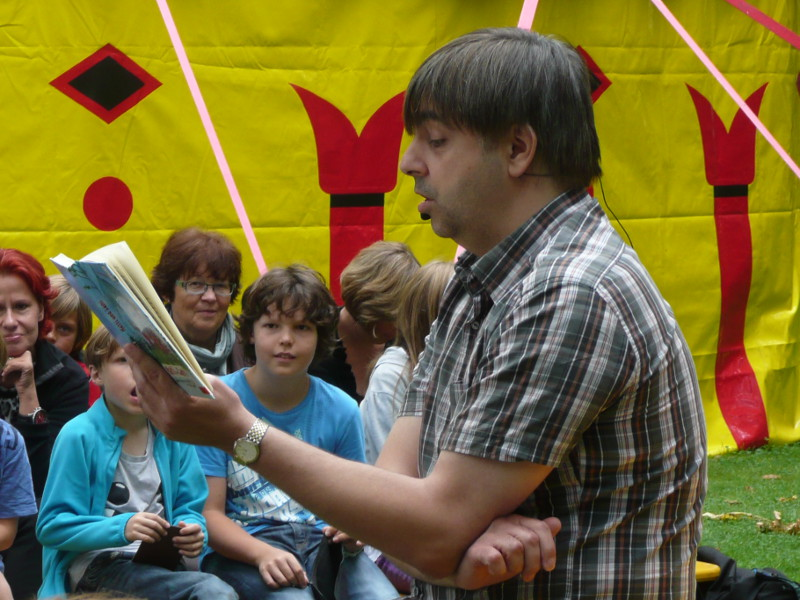
German writer Salah Naoura reading Superworm at the Erlanger Poetenfest in 2011

The Guardian said that the illustrations for Superworm were "marvellous", and they also showed love for Donaldson's writing style. In 2021 Superworm received its own 25-minute short film created and produced by Magic Light Pictures based on the book, which was distributed by the BBC and aired on BBC One on 25 December 2021. It stars actors Olivia Colman as the narrator and Matt Smith as Superworm. The film was directed by Jac Hamman and Sarah Scrimgeour.

In 2021 Donaldson and Scheffler released a new adaptation called Let's Find Superworm: A Lift-the-Flap Book. In December 2021, the Radio Times released a Superworm Christmas-themed puzzle and activity book in celebration of Christmas. In 2022 a Superworm-themed trail was launched at the Whinlatter Forest Park. In December 2023, it was revealed that Superworm was the most borrowed book from libraries in Hertfordshire. In January 2026, Donalson and Scheffler released Superworm: Slide and Spin. In July 2026, actor Tom Holland read Superworm on CBeebies Bedtime Stories; he also made references to superheroes while reading through the book about a superhero.

== Awards ==
Year	Ceremony	Award	Outcome	Ref
2014	Red House Children's Book Award	Red House Award	Won	
2013	City Library of Buxtehude	Buxtehuder Kälbchen Picture Book Prize	Won	

== Publication history ==
Superworm (2012), Alison Green Books

== See also ==
- Stick Man, a 2008 children's book by Julia Donaldson
- Gruffalo Granny, an upcoming children's book by Julia Donaldson
