= Jessica Henwick =

British actress (born 1992)

- Henwick in 2026
- Born: 30 August 1992 (age 34); Surrey, England
- Occupation: Actress
- Years active: 2009–present

Jessica Henwick (/ˈhɛnɪk/ HEN-ik) (born 30 August 1992) is an English actress, writer and director. She began her career in 2010 and is known for her roles in Game of Thrones (2015–17), Iron Fist (2017–18), Love and Monsters (2020), Glass Onion: A Knives Out Mystery (2022), The Royal Hotel (2023) and How to Make a Killing (2026). Her directorial debut, the short film Bus Girl (2022), was nominated for a BAFTA.

== Early life and education ==
Henwick is from Surrey and is the daughter of a Singaporean-Chinese mother of Teochew descent and a Zambian-born English father. Her father, Mark, became an author in 2012 and wrote the urban fantasy series Bite Back. She has two brothers, one older and one younger.

Henwick attended Collingwood College in Camberley. She trained briefly at Redroofs Theatre School before dropping out. She also trained with the National Youth Theatre under the tutelage of Rikki Beadle-Blair.

== Career ==
=== Early career ===
Henwick happened upon a casting call in Chinatown, London and her mother encouraged her to pursue the opportunity. In June 2009, it was announced Henwick had been cast in the lead role of Bo in the CBBC series Spirit Warriors, making her the first actress of East Asian descent to play the lead role in a British television series.

In early 2013, Henwick made her professional theatre debut in the international premiere of Running on the Cracks, based on the book by Julia Donaldson. The Guardian wrote, "with tremendous physical presence, Henwick captures the sense of adolescent righteousness, passion and confusion of a girl trying to create order in an unfair universe." Theatre critic Joyce McMillan wrote that Henwick was "outstanding as Leo".

Later that year, Henwick was cast as Jane Jeong Trenka in the drama Obsession: Dark Desires about Trenka's stalking in Minnesota, 1991, which she details in her book The Language of Blood. Henwick joined the cast of Silk as new barrister pupil Amy. She reprised her role for the spin-off radio series Silk: The Clerks' Room.

=== International breakthrough ===
In 2015, Henwick joined the cast of the HBO series Game of Thrones in Season 5 as Nymeria Sand. She continued performing the role until Season 7. Henwick originally auditioned for the role of Rey in Star Wars: The Force Awakens before losing out to Daisy Ridley for the role. Nevertheless, she still had a role in the film as the X-wing pilot Jess Pava. The character became a fan favourite.

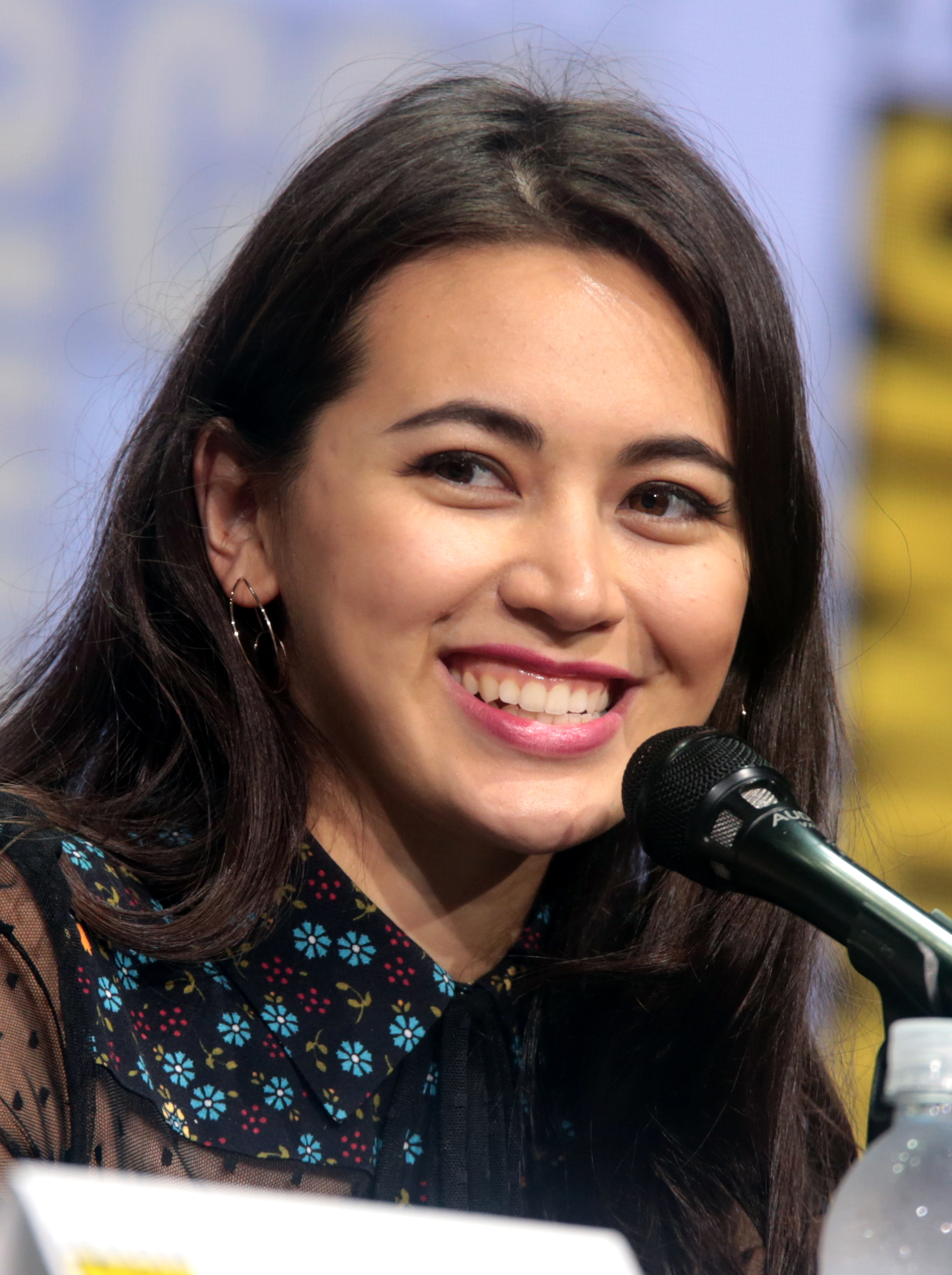
Henwick in 2017

In 2017, Henwick appeared as Colleen Wing in the Marvel Cinematic Universe television series Iron Fist (2017–2018). Although critical reception of Iron Fist was generally negative, Henwick's performance in the series was well received. She reprised the role for the miniseries The Defenders (2017), as well as the second season of Luke Cage (2018). At the end of 2017, Henwick was listed as one of Variety's Top Breakout Stars. In 2021, it was reported that Henwick turned down an offer to audition for a role in Shang-Chi and the Legend of the Ten Rings, which is part of the same franchise as Iron Fist, in the hopes that she could reprise her role as Colleen Wing. In 2026, she revealed there had been talks with her and Marvel to reprise her role as Colleen in the third season of Daredevil: Born Again (2027), but she turned down the offer in hopes of a better storyline in the future.

In 2018, Henwick was cast in Godzilla vs. Kong, though her part as well as Zhang Ziyi's role did not make the released theatrical cut.

In 2020, Henwick co-starred in the Fox science fiction thriller Underwater, and the films Love and Monsters and Sofia Coppola's On the Rocks. That same year she was listed as one of The Hollywood Reporter's Rising Stars and won the Brit to Watch award at the Newport Beach Film Festival. The following year she starred in The Matrix Resurrections. IGN called Henwick the "best part of Resurrections", while Deadline Hollywood said she was "what makes the movie worth watching". She was nominated and won Best Supporting Actress on the Gold list Honors for the most outstanding Asian achievements in the film industry.

In 2022, Henwick was in two of the most highly viewed Netflix films of all time: The Gray Man and Glass Onion: A Knives Out Mystery. She directed her short film Bus Girl, shot entirely on a smartphone during a break from filming Glass Onion. It was nominated for a BAFTA award for Best Short Film.

In 2023, Henwick joined the cast of The Royal Hotel directed by Kitty Green. Her performance was well reviewed with The Hollywood Reporter calling her 'superb'. The film received an 89% score on Rotten Tomatoes.

In 2024, Henwick appeared in Cuckoo opposite Hunter Schafer. Her performance required her to learn American Sign Language. That year she also reprised her role in the second season of animated series Blood of Zeus. Henwick served on the BAFTA jury for Best Short Film that year, following her nomination the previous year.

In 2025, Henwick joined the cast of Silo, films How to Make a Killing and The Roots Manoeuvre, and the Netflix adaptation Vladimir (TV series).

In 2026, she starred as Sofia in the horror comedy film Everybody Wants to Fuck Me alongside Taron Egerton. TheWrap called her performance "beguiling" and praised her "poise" and "elegance" in the role. The film premiered at the 2026 Toronto International Film Festival.

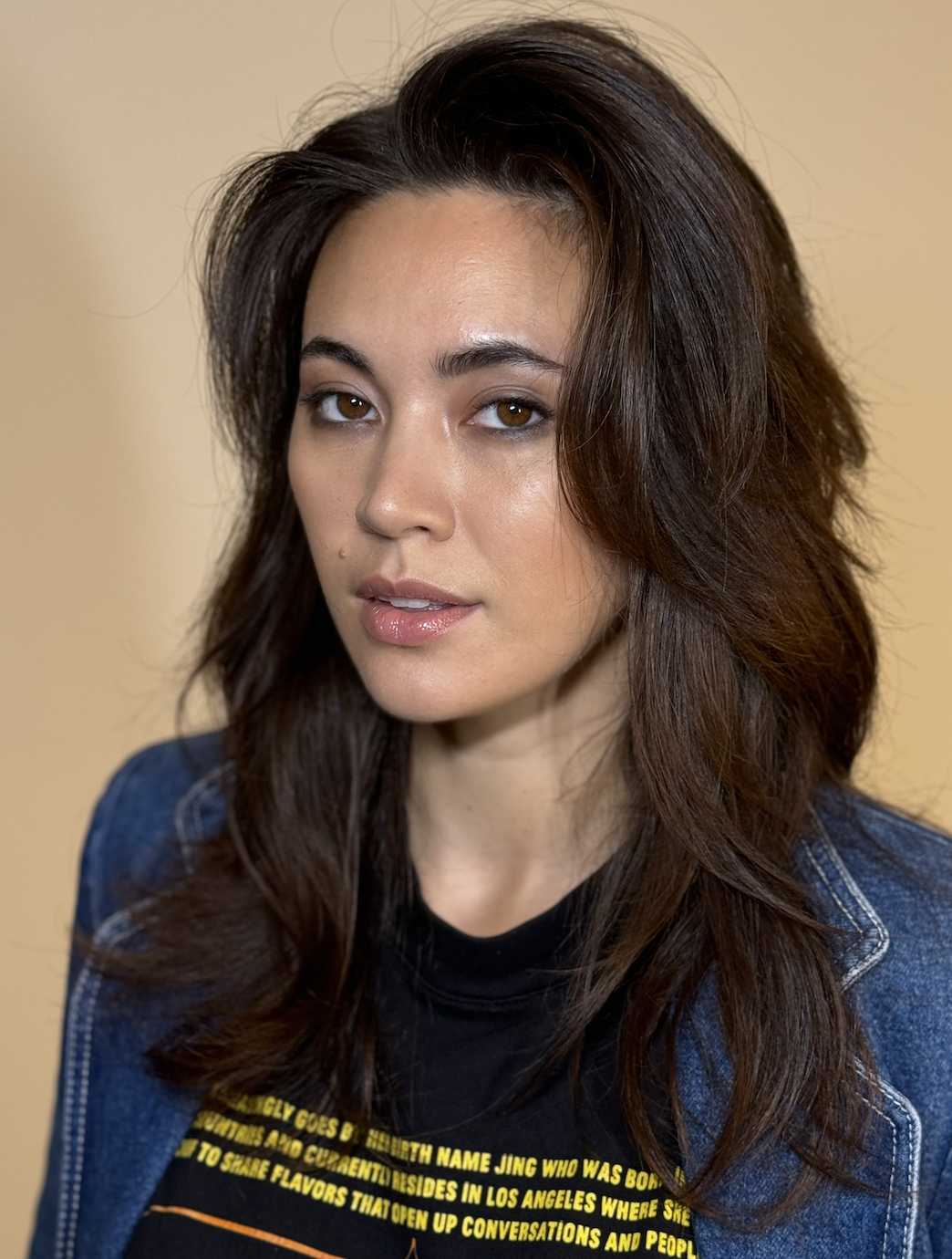
Henwick in 2023

=== Writing ===
In 2020, it was announced Amazon had picked up Nancy Wu Done It, a young adult series that Henwick co-wrote. She has a miniseries in development with Emu Films.

In 2022, Henwick wrote an episode for the animated series Moley. Henwick won the Mary Pickford prize for female filmmaker, for the Xiaomi short film Bus Girl that she wrote, starred in and directed. The short was nominated for the BAFTA awards in 2023. She wrote and directed the sequel Sandwich Man the following year.

== Filmography ==
=== Film ===
Year	Title	Role	Notes	Ref.
2009	St. Trinian's 2: The Legend of Fritton's Gold	Globe Girl	Uncredited	
2014	Dr Liebenstein	Rachel (1972)		
2015	Star Wars: The Force Awakens	Jessika "Testor" Pava		
2017	Newness	Joanne		
2020	Underwater	Emily Haversham		
2020	On the Rocks	Fiona Saunders		
2020	Love and Monsters	Aimee		
2021	The Matrix Resurrections	Bugs		
2022	The Gray Man	Suzanne Brewer		
2022	Glass Onion: A Knives Out Mystery	Peg		
2023	The Royal Hotel	Liv		
2024	Cuckoo	Beth		
2026	How to Make a Killing	Ruth		
2026	The Land of Sometimes	Mother (voice)		
2026	Everybody Wants to Fuck Me	Sofia		
2027	The Roots Manoeuvre †	TBA	Post-production	

=== Television ===
Year	Title	Role	Notes	Ref.
2010	Spirit Warriors	Bo	Main cast; 10 episodes	
2012	The Thick of It	Charlotte	1 episode	
2014	Obsession: Dark Desires	Jane Jeong Trenka	Episode: "Silent Scream"	
2014	Silk	Amy Lang	Main cast (series 3); 5 episodes	
2014	Lewis	Chloe Ilson	2 episodes	
2015–2017	Game of Thrones	Nymeria Sand	Recurring role (seasons 5–7); 8 episodes	
2017	Fortitude	Bianca Mankyo	1 episode	
2017–2018	Iron Fist	Colleen Wing	Main cast; 23 episodes	
2017	The Defenders	Colleen Wing	Miniseries, main cast; 6 episodes	
2018	Luke Cage	Colleen Wing	Episode: "Wig Out"	
2020–2025	Blood of Zeus	Alexia	Main cast (voice role); 20 episodes	
2021–2022	Blade Runner: Black Lotus	Elle	Main cast (voice role); 12 episodes	
2021–2022	Moley	Dotty	Also writer, Main cast (voice role); 45 episodes	
2022	Carpool Karaoke: The Series	Self	Episode: "Simu Liu & Jessica Henwick"	
2024	Twilight of the Gods	Sandraudiga	3 episodes (voice role)	
2025–present	Silo	Helen	Guest (season 2); Main cast (season 3–present); 9 episodes	
2026	Vladimir	Cynthia	Limited-run series, main cast; 8 episodes	

=== Video games ===
Year	Title	Voice Role	Notes	Ref.
2015–2016	Dreamfall Chapters: The Longest Journey	Enu; Hanna Roth		
2022	Lego Star Wars: The Skywalker Saga	Jessika "Testor" Pava		

=== Web series ===
Year	Title	Role	Notes	Ref.
2025	Tales From Woodcreek	River Stong	Actual play; guest role, 2 episodes	

=== Stage ===
Year	Title	Role	Notes	Ref.
2013	Running on the Cracks	Leo	National tour	

=== Radio ===
Year	Title	Role	Notes	Ref.
2011–2012	North by Northamptonshire	Helen	BBC Radio Four	
2013	Monday to Friday	Julie	BBC Radio Scotland	
2014–2015	Silk: The Clerks Room	Amy Lang	Series 1 & 2	
2020	Harrow Lake	Narrator		
2020	The Long Way Home	Narrator		
2021	Hold Still Vincent	Faye		
2026	Harry Potter	Narcissa Malfoy	Half-Blood Prince, Harry Potter and the Deathly Hallows	

== Awards and nominations ==
Year	Award	Category	Nominated work	Result	Ref.
2016	Accolade Competition	Award of Excellence (shared: Lourdes Faberes + Giles Alderson)	The Heart of the Forest	Won	
2017	Asians on Film Festival	Best Original Script (shared with Lourdes Faberes)	The Heart of the Forest	Won	
2017	Asians on Film Festival	Best Ensemble	The Heart of the Forest	Nominated	
2017	Variety	Top Breakout Star	Iron Fist	Won	
2020	Newport Beach Film Festival	Festival Honors Award – Brit to Watch	Underwater	Won	
2020	The Hollywood Reporter	The Hollywood Reporter Rising Young Star	Film/TV career so far	Won	
2021	Gold List Honors	Best Supporting Actress	The Matrix Resurrections	Won	
2022	Birmingham Film Festival	Audience Award	Xiaomi's Bus Girl	Won	
2022	Coronado Island Film Festival	Narrative Shorts	Xiaomi's Bus Girl	Won	
2022	Coronado Island Film Festival	Mary Pickford Award for Outstanding Achievement by a Female Director	Xiaomi's Bus Girl	Won	
2022	Satellite Awards	Best Ensemble	Glass Onion: A Knives Out Mystery	Won	
2022	Hollywood Critics Association	Best Ensemble	Glass Onion: A Knives Out Mystery	Nominated	
2022	Critics' Choice Movie Awards	Best Ensemble	Glass Onion: A Knives Out Mystery	Won	
2023	Gold Derby Awards	Best Ensemble	Glass Onion: A Knives Out Mystery	Nominated	
2023	British Academy Film Awards	Best British Short Film	Bus Girl	Nominated	
