= Zog (children's book) =

2010 children's book by Julia Donaldson

- Author: Julia Donaldson
- Audio read by: Imelda Staunton
- Illustrator: Axel Scheffler
- Genre: Children's picture book
- Published: 2010 (Alison Green)
- Publication place: England
- Media type: Print (paperback, hardback)
- Pages: 32 (unpaginated)
- ISBN: 9781407115597
- OCLC: 972513647

Zog is a 2010 children's picture book by Julia Donaldson and illustrated by Axel Scheffler, about a young accident-prone dragon, named Zog, who wants to be the best student in dragon school.

== Reception ==
BookTrust gave a positive reviews, commending its "vivid" and "imaginative" illustrations and "perfectly crafted" rhyming text, also saying that Zog will delight to children and adults alike.

Zog has also been reviewed by The Wall Street Journal, Booklist, and the School Library Journal.

In 2010, the story book won the Galaxy National Book Award.

An interactive Zog-themed woodland nature trail for children was installed at Grizedale in Cumbria in 2019.

== Publication history ==
- Zog (2010), Alison Green
- A Gold Star for Zog (2012), Arthur A. Levine Books

== Television adaptation ==
Magic Light Pictures produced a half-hour television adaptation, also known as Zog. Directed by Max Lang, it was broadcast on Christmas Day 2018 on BBC One. Magic Light previously adapted five other Donaldson/Scheffler books for the BBC, including The Gruffalo, The Gruffalo's Child, Room on the Broom, Stick Man and The Highway Rat. It won the 2018 International Emmy for Kids Animation.

=== Home media ===
Zog was released on DVD on 11 February 2019 in the United Kingdom.

=== Voice cast ===
- Sir Lenny Henry as the Narrator
- Hugh Skinner as Zog, an accident-prone dragon who tries his best every day to win a golden star.
  - Rocco Wright as young Zog.
- Kit Harington as Sir Gadabout, a knight.
- Patsy Ferran as Princess Pearl, a princess who dreams of being a medical doctor.
- Tracey Ullman as Madame Dragon, a green dragon and teacher at Dragon School. Ullman also voices Pearl's governess.
- Rob Brydon as the Horse, Castle Guards

== Zog and the Flying Doctors ==
A sequel, titled Zog and the Flying Doctors, was published by Alison Green Books in September 2016. Magic Light Pictures and BBC One produced a televised adaptation of the book and was released on Christmas Day 2020. It was released on DVD on 22 March 2021 in the United Kingdom.

=== Voice cast ===
- Sir Lenny Henry as the Narrator
- Hugh Skinner as Zog
- Patsy Ferran as Princess Pearl
  - Rosabel Lawson as young Pearl
- Daniel Ings as Sir Gadabout
- Alexandra Roach as the Sunburnt Mermaid
- Mark Bonnar as the Distressed Unicorn
- Lucian Msamati as the Sneezy Lion
- Rob Brydon as the King

== TV series ==
A television series adaptation of the book premiered in May 2026.
