= Pip and Posy =

Book series by Axel Scheffler and Camilla Reid

- The Bedtime Frog
- The Little Puddle; The Super Scooter; The Big Balloon; The Snowy Day; The Scary Monster; Look and Say; The Bedtime Frog; The New Friend; The Christmas Tree; The Friendly Snail; The Birthday Party
- Author: Axel Scheffler; Camilla Reid
- Language: English
- Genre: Children's literature
- Publisher: Nosy Crow
- Published: 2011 – 2021

Pip and Posy is a series of British children's picture books written by Camilla Reid and Axel Scheffler, known for his work on the Gruffalo series with author Julia Donaldson. The series follows the adventures of two animal friends, Pip the rabbit and Posy the mouse, as they navigate the ups and downs of their everyday lives.

Each book in the series typically explores various themes and lessons that are relevant to young children, such as friendship, sharing, jealousy, and problem-solving.

The books have gained acclaim among parents, caregivers, and educators for their capacity to impart social and emotional skills to preschool-aged children. They serve as resources for initiating discussions on topics related to friendship and emotions within early childhood education.

== Books ==
| Order | Title | Publication date | Story |
|---|---|---|---|
| 1 | The Little Puddle | 7 April 2011 | Pip and Posy enjoy a fun playdate, but when Pip has an unexpected accident, Posy comes to the rescue, teaching him a valuable lesson about potty training. |
| 2 | The Super Scooter | 7 April 2011 | Posy takes a tumble while trying out Pip's scooter, leading to an apology and a day of sandcastle building, strengthening their friendship. |
| 3 | The Big Balloon | 5 April 2012 | Pip's beloved red balloon pops, but with Posy's clever idea, they find a way to turn their day around. |
| 4 | The Snowy Day | 4 October 2012 | Pip and Posy's snowy adventure takes an amusing twist as they attempt to build a snowman, ultimately finding a cozy solution indoors. |
| 5 | The Scary Monster | 5 September 2013 | Posy encounters a "scary" monster at home, only to discover it is a playful Pip in disguise, teaching them about bravery and sharing. |
| 6 | Look and Say | 6 August 2015 | Pip and Posy have a delightful day at the park, snack on treats, play with trains, and end the day with a shared bath. |
| 7 | The Bedtime Frog | 3 September 2015 | Posy faces a sleepover dilemma when she forgets her favourite toy. Pip tries various substitutes until he offers his cherished pig toy, providing comfort and a peaceful night's sleep. |
| 8 | The New Friend | 5 May 2016 | During a beach day, Pip befriends Zac, causing a humorous exploration of friendships and shared experiences. |
| 9 | The Christmas Tree | 4 October 2018 | Pip and Posy decorate a Christmas tree, but decorations mysteriously disappear. The story takes an unexpected turn when Posy discovers Pip is not feeling well, leading to a heartwarming resolution. |
| 10 | The Friendly Snail | 4 March 2021 | Pip and Posy's outdoor adventure takes a noisy turn, leading to a misunderstanding, but when a bird threatens Pip's new snail friend, Posy's voice becomes unexpectedly valuable. |
| 11 | The Birthday Party | 2 September 2021 | Posy's birthday celebration takes a comical twist when Pip's gift causes a cake catastrophe, leading to an entertaining journey of problem-solving and friendship. |

== Removal of Camilla Reid's authorial credit ==
Whilst initially the Pip and Posy books were credited to Camilla Reid and Axel Scheffler, recent re-printings are credited solely to Axel Scheffler. No explanation for this has been provided by the publisher Nosy Crow, although Reid left her job as editorial director at Nosy Crow in 2021.

== Television series ==
A British preschool television series adaptation was produced by Magic Light Pictures and animated by Blue Zoo Animation Studio. It is based on characters from the book series. The TV series premiered in the UK in March 2021.

=== Series and episodes ===
Pip and Posy has two series, with a total of 104 episodes. An exclusive Sky Kids Christmas special episode aired in December 2021. In October 2022, the first cinema show (Pip and Posy's Cinema Show) was released, with a second cinema show (Pip and Posy and Friends Cinema Show) in March 2024.

Magic Light Pictures later produced a spin-off series called Pip and Posy Let's Learn which launched in October 2023 on Sky Kids channel.

=== Awards and nominations ===
- UK – British Animation Awards: Best Children's Pre-School Series winner
- Canada – Banff Rockie Awards: Animation: Pre-School (0-4) nomination
- UK – Children's BAFTA nominee – Pre-School Animation
