= Nosy Crow =

Children's book publisher

- Founded: 2010; 16 years ago
- Founders: Kate Wilson (Managing Director); Adrian Soar (Commercial Director); Camilla Reid (Editorial Director)
- Country of origin: United Kingdom
- Headquarters location: London
- Distribution: Grantham Book Services (UK); Allen & Unwin (Australia)
- Publication types: Children's Books
- Fiction genres: Children's Books
- Revenue: ▲£22 million (2020)
- Official website: nosycrow.com

Nosy Crow is an independent children's publisher, based in London. The company was founded in 2010 by Kate Wilson, Adrian Soar, and Camilla Reid. In 2020, the company was named Independent Publisher of the Year at the British Book Awards. In mid 2023, the company opened a branch in the United States called Nosy Crow Inc.

== History ==
Nosy Crow was founded in 2010, and published its first book in January 2011. In its first year of publishing, it released 23 books and 3 apps, and invoiced one million pounds. The company has a strong background in rights-selling. Wilson began her career selling rights at Faber and Faber, and in its first year, foreign rights to Nosy Crow titles were sold in 16 languages. By September 2014, Nosy Crow had grown to become the 16th largest children’s publisher in the UK, according to Nielsen Bookscan data. By 2019, the company had become the 12th largest children’s publisher in the UK, during a period when the wider industry was experiencing reduced revenue. In November 2013, Nosy Crow implemented an innovative digital audio feature called 'Stories Aloud’, a free digital audio component included with Nosy Crow's paperback picture books. In May 2023, Nosy Crow launched a United States company, Nosy Crow Inc.

Nosy Crow publishes a wide range of commercial fiction and non-fiction books for children aged from 0 to 12 years. The company has developed various interactive and multimedia formats in its publishing programme. Its most successful titles to date include Escape Room, written by Christopher Edge, the Peekaboo series, written by Camilla Reid and illustrated by Ingela P Arrhenius, the Bizzy Bear books, written by Camilla Reid and illustrated by Benji Davies, and the Pip and Posy books, written by Camilla Reid and illustrated by Axel Scheffler. The Pip and Posy books were among Nosy Crow’s early commercial successes, contributing to the company’s strong sales performance in 2011. Before founding Nosy Crow, Wilson worked at Macmillan, where she collaborated with illustrator Axel Scheffler and was involved in publishing titles such as The Gruffalo.

Other successful titles and series include Open Very Carefully, winner of the 2014 Waterstones Children's Book Prize, the My Brother is a Superhero series, written by David Solomons, which has sold in over 20 languages worldwide and been awarded the 2016 Waterstones Children's Book Prize and the 2016 British Book Industry Award Children's Book of the Year Prize, Pamela Butchart's Baby Aliens series, which has won a Blue Peter Book Award and a Children's Book Award, the Felt Flaps series by Ingela P. Arrhenius, winner of the Sainsbury's Children's Book of the Year Award, There's a Bear on My Chair by Ross Collins, winner of the inaugural Amnesty CILIP Greenaway Honour in 2016 and a UKLA Book Award in 2017, and I Am The Seed That Grew The Tree: A Nature Poem For Every Day Of The Year, winner of the inaugural Waterstones Children’s Gift of the Year Award in 2018. Additional successful series include Zoe’s Rescue Zoo by Amelia Cobb and Sophy Williams, Sing Along with Me! by Yu-hsuan Huang, and Unicorn Academy: Where Magic Happens by Julie Sykes & Lucy Truman

== Apps ==
Between 2011 and 2018, Nosy Crow developed and released over 25 in-house apps for the iOS platform. In April 2018, the company announced that it would cease its in-house app development programme and close its app department, citing the challenging commercial environment for children's reading apps.

== Partnerships ==
In North America, many of the company's illustrated book titles were published under an imprint of the same name by Candlewick Press, and in Australia, Nosy Crow books are distributed by Allen & Unwin.

In November 2012, the company created an instant picture book edition of the John Lewis Christmas television advert, in partnership with the department store. The company has since produced four more picture books based on John Lewis Christmas television adverts. In September 2014, the company announced a partnership with The National Trust, to publish a jointly-branded children's book list, and in October 2015, Nosy Crow announced a second partnership with The British Museum for another jointly-branded children's book list. In June 2023, Nosy Crow announced their third partnership with Cambridge University for another jointly-branded children's book list.

== Awards ==
Since its establishment, Nosy Crow has received several industry awards for its publications, digital products and overall business performance. These include:

=== Business Awards ===
- British Book Awards: Children's Publisher of the Year 2025, Independent Publisher of the Year 2020, Children's Publisher of the Year 2019, Children's Publisher of the Year 2017
- IPG Independent Publishing Awards: Publiship International Award 2025, Clays Children’s Publisher of the Year 2023; Zebralution Audio Award 2022; Marketing Award 2019; International Achievement Award 2018; Children’s Publisher of the Year 2017; Independent Publisher of the Year, Children's Publisher of the Year 2016; Digital Marketing Award, Young Independent Publisher of the Year 2015; Digital Marketing Award, International Achievement of the Year 2014; Children's Publisher of the Year, International Achievement of the Year 2013; Newcomer of the Year, Children's Publisher of the Year, Innovation of the Year 2012
- Queen's Award for Enterprise: International Trade 2018
- Stationers’ Company Innovation Excellence Award - June 2014
- Nectar Small Business Award: Small Business of the Year - September 2014
- Growing Business Award: Young Company of the Year - November 2014
- Mumpreneur Award: Inspirational Business Mum (Kate Wilson) - October 2011

=== Book Awards ===
- Waterstones Children's Gift of the Year (I Am The Seed That Grew The Tree: A Nature Poem For Every Day Of The Year) - November 2018
- Sainsbury’s Children’s Book Award: Children’s Book of the Year (Where's Mr Lion?) - August 2017
- UKLA Book Award: 3 to 6 Category (There's a Bear on My Chair) - June 2017
- Tir Na n-Og Award: Best English language children's book (Sweet Pizza) - June 2017
- Amnesty CILIP Greenaway Honour (There's a Bear on My Chair) - June 2016
- Children's Book Award: Overall Winner (My Headteacher is a Vampire Rat) - May 2016
- British Book Industry Award: Children's Book of the Year (My Brother is a Superhero) - May 2016
- Waterstones Children's Book Prize: Overall Winner (My Brother is a Superhero) - March 2016
- Tir Na n-Og Award: Best English language children's book (Cow Girl) - May 2015
- Blue Peter Book Award: Best Story (The Spy Who Loved School Dinners) - March 2015
- Waterstones Children's Book Prize: Picture Book Category Winner (Open Very Carefully) - April 2014

=== App Awards ===
- FutureBook Awards: Best Children’s Digital Book (Goldilocks and Little Bear) - December 2016; Best Children’s Digital Book (Snow White) - December 2015; Best Children's Fiction Digital Book (Jack and the Beanstalk), Most Inspiring Digital Publishing Person (Kate Wilson) - November 2014; Best Children's Digital Book (Rounds: Parker Penguin) - November 2013; Best Children's App (Cinderella) - December 2011
- UKLA Digital Book Awards: Digital Book Award (Goldilocks and Little Bear) - June 2016; Digital Book Award (Axel Scheffler’s Flip Flap Safari) - July 2015
- Booktrust Best Book Award: Best Tech (Little Red Riding Hood) - July 2014
- Publishing Innovation Award: App — Juvenile (Cinderella) - January 2012
- KAPi Award: Children's Book App or eBook (Cinderella) - January 2012
- iLounge Award: iPad Kid's App of the Year (Cinderella) - November 2011
