= Monkey Puzzle (book) =

2000 book by Julia Donaldson

- Author: Julia Donaldson
- Illustrator: Axel Scheffler
- Language: English, Arabic, Hebrew
- Series: None
- Genre: Children's
- Publisher: Macmillan
- Publication date: 2000
- Publication place: United Kingdom
- Pages: 24
- ISBN: 0-333-72001-6
- OCLC: 43542394

Monkey Puzzle is an illustrated children's story book written by Julia Donaldson and illustrated by Axel Scheffler, published in 2000 by Alison Green Books. It was published in the United States as Where's My Mom?

== Plot summary ==
The narrative of Monkey Puzzle centers around a young monkey who becomes separated from her mother in the vast and dense jungle. Feeling lost and alone, the little monkey embarks on a quest to reunite with her beloved parent. Along her journey, she encounters a helpful butterfly who volunteers to assist her in the search.

The butterfly, though well-intentioned, frequently confuses different animals for the monkey's mother due to its misunderstanding of the descriptions provided by the monkey. The butterfly's suggestions include a diverse array of creatures such as an elephant, a snake, a spider, a parrot, a frog, and a bat. Despite the butterfly's best efforts, these misidentifications lead to humorous interactions and highlight the differences between various jungle inhabitants.

As the monkey and the butterfly continue their exploration, they eventually stumble upon the monkey's father. He affectionately calls the monkey, urging her to return home. Just as they are about to head home, the butterfly catches sight of the monkey's true mother. Reuniting with her mother fills the young monkey's heart with joy, ending her journey of discovery and separation.

The tale concludes on a heartwarming note, with the monkey and her mother embracing each other. The butterfly, having played a crucial role in their reunion, also shares in their happiness. This reinforces the importance of friendship, teamwork, and the enduring connection between loved ones.
