= The Smartest Giant in Town =

2002 children's book by Julia Donaldson

- Author: Julia Donaldson
- Illustrator: Axel Scheffler
- Language: English
- Genre: Children's literature
- Publisher: Macmillan Publishers
- Publication date: 20 September 2002
- Publication place: United Kingdom
- Pages: 32
- ISBN: 978-0-333-96144-5
- OCLC: 59462947
- Preceded by: Night Monkey, Day Monkey
- Followed by: The Snail and the Whale

The Smartest Giant in Town is a 2002 British children's book written by British writer and playwright Julia Donaldson, illustrated by Axel Scheffler and published by Macmillan Publishers. The story follows a giant named George who is the scruffiest giant in town. He goes and buys new clothes to look smart and helps other animals on his way back home by giving the clothes away.

== Plot ==
George is a giant who is unhappy, as he is the scruffiest giant in town. He goes to a shop selling giant-sized clothes and buys a smart-looking outfit that makes him feel like the smartest giant in town. While walking home, George runs into multiple animals in need of help. George decides to help the animals with their problems by giving away some of his new clothes.

He gives his tie to a giraffe, his shirt to a goat, and his sock to a fox; he also gives other items to other animals. By the time he arrives home, he has nothing left of his new clothes and is back to his old scruffy outfit, and George thinks he is no longer smart. Although the animals return to George and thank him for his help, they also give him a gift for his generosity. George quickly realises that it was never about looking good and smart; it was about being kind and helping others.

== Legacy and adaptations ==
In 2021 a live stage play based on the book was hosted at the Little Angel Theatre in London. In January 2022 an adaptation of the original book was published called The Smartest Giant in Town: a Push, Pull and Slide Book, which follows the same story but is shorter in pages, only having ten pages. The Guardian listed it as the 7th best book written by Julia Donaldson.
