= Murder of Mary Lynn Witherspoon =

Murder victim and educator

Mary Lynn Witherspoon
- Born: Mary Lynn Witherspoon; August 14, 1950
- Died: November 14, 2003 (aged 53); Charleston, South Carolina
- Occupation: School teacher
- Years active: 1975–2003

Mary Lynn Witherspoon (1950–2003) was a school teacher in Charleston, South Carolina, and died in 2003. Her ex-boyfriend's child, Tennent Brown, had stalked and obsessed over her for 22 years. Brown broke into her home after being released from prison then raped and killed her.

== Early life ==
Mary Lynn was born in 1950, and was one of four daughters to Gamewell and Eleanor. With only 17 months between them, Mary Lynn and her sister, Jackie Olsen, shared a bedroom and spent their childhood side by side. She was a French teacher at Charlestowne Academy. She also taught kids that were staying in the local hospital, MUSC, during the school year.

In 1981, Mary Lynn met Edmonds Tennent Brown III, who was an attorney. After a while, his son, Edmonds Tennent Brown IV (addressed as Brown), began growing obsessive and jealous of Mary Lynn.

== Death ==
On November 14, 2003 in the early morning, after 23 years of stalking, Tennent Brown broke into Mary Lynn's home as she was getting ready to leave for work. He pushed open the door, knocked her on the floor and dragged her upstairs to her bedroom where Tennent raped her, strangled her, and left her in her bathtub where the police later found her.

== Legacy ==
In 2005, South Carolina introduced a law that was named after her, calling it "Mary Lynn's Law." and the Victim Information and Notification Everyday system (V.I.N.E) was said to have failed her, and companies such as those immediately updated their systems, including immediate notification to the victims when prisoners are released.

On April 14, 2013, The Crime and Investigation Network's Look Who's Stalking program televised an episode that documented Mary Lynn's story. On April 12, 2016, Discovery ID's Obsession: Dark Desires aired an episode based on the tragic story of Mary Lynn. Mary Lynn was "interviewed" but later revealed to be an actress that was interviewed. It ended with a short monologue (speech) given by her sister of the days, weeks, months, after Mary Lynn's death.
