= Lourdes Faberes =

Philippine-born actress

- Born: 1974 or 1975 (age 51–52); Manila, Philippines
- Education: Royal Central School of Speech and Drama
- Occupation: Actress
- Years active: 1999–present

Lourdes Faberes (born 1974 or 1975) is a Philippines-born actress based in the United Kingdom. She is best known for her roles as Pollution in the Amazon series Good Omens, the assassin Altani on History Channel's Knightfall, Michelle Ito on ABC's series, Whiskey Cavalier and Kate Fletcher in The Sandman TV series.

== Early life and theatre ==
Lourdes Faberes was born and raised in Manila, Philippines. She moved to the United Kingdom in 1997, and studied and gained an MA degree in Performance (Advanced Theatre Practice) at the Royal Central School of Speech and Drama.

Faberes has stated that her mother wanted "overachieving children". Although her parents first suggested that she become a lawyer, her mother brought Faberes to various extracurricular activities, including tennis, embroidery, and arms and ammunition. She was first introduced to acting when her mother took her to the National Theatre in the Philippines to improve her elocution. Her acting debut was in a production of The King and I in 1991. Faberes performed for the Philippines repertory company in Miss Saigon.

== Career ==
Faberes made her screen acting debut in the 'ensemble' of the television series Great Performances, production of Jesus Christ Superstar. In 2004, Faberes starred as Isabel Liu, a Flight Dynamics Officer [Fido], from mission control in the BBC's Space Odyssey: Voyage to the Planets. Since then, Faberes has clocked numerous TV series appearances as well as major roles in many short films. Recent years have seen her progress when landing a more regular slot in 2018 for Season 1 of Knightfall as Altani. In 2019, Faberes followed this with further regular appearances, as Sister Li in Season 1 of Grenslanders (Floodlands), a Dutch-Belgian TV series, and as "Pollution", one of the four Horsemen of the Apocalypse in the Amazon Neil Gaiman and Terry Pratchett TV series Good Omens.

Faberes appeared as a SPECTRE agent in the Bond film, No Time to Die. In 2022, she appeared as Kate Fletcher in an episode of The Sandman.

In 2022, she starred as Emilia in Operation Fortune: Ruse de Guerre alongside Jason Statham, Aubrey Plaza, Josh Hartnett, Eddie Marsan, and Hugh Grant. For her performance in the role, she was nominated, and won the 2023 9th National Film Awards UK Award for Best Supporting Actress.

== Filmography ==
Key
†	Denotes works that have not yet been released

=== Film ===
Year	Title	Role	Notes
2008	A Dying Breed	Christine Abernathie	
2009	Barry Brown	Hendoo girl	Short film
2009	State of Play	Reporter	Uncredited
2009	Spread	Prince Stelio's Gang	Uncredited
2011	Bellinger's Affair	Linh Bellinger	Short film
2011	Cross Your Fingers	Maya	Short film
2011	Room 304	Maid	
2013	47 Cleveland	Red / Blue	Short film; also as producer
2014	Balsa Wood	Lorna	Short film
2014	Someone You Love	Pepita Ponce	Danish film
2014	My Son & the Hole Punch	Sue	Short film; also as producer
2016	The Heart of the Forest	Eve	Short film; also as producer
2016	Mother of Pearl	Pearl	Short film; also as producer
2021	No Time to Die	SPECTRE Agent	
2021	Boiling Point	Sara Southworth	
2022	Bus Girl	Ms. Mauve	Short film
2022	Operation Fortune: Ruse de Guerre	Emilia	
2023	Surprised by Oxford	Professor Rutledge	
TBA	A Dying Breed	Christine Abernathie	Post production

=== Television ===
Year	Title	Role	Notes
2000	Great Performances in Jesus Christ Superstar	Ensemble	Episode: "Jesus Christ Superstar"
2001	Dr. Terrible's House of Horrible	Woo Woo	Episode: "Frenzy of Tongs"
2002	Manchild	Pi Lau	Episode: "Jealousy"
2004	Space Odyssey: Voyage to the Planets	Flight Dynamics Officer Isabel Liu	Regular role (BBC)
2004	New Tricks	Patricia Lee	Episode: "ID Parade"
2007	Joe's Palace	Laarni	TV film
2008	Coming Up	Panan	Episode: "The Thai Bride"
2009	Law and Order	Dr. Julia Lam	Episode: "Love and Loss"
2009	Holby City	Hansa Nichols	2 episodes
2012	Safelight 19	Alpha Feral	1 episode
2018	Knightfall	Altani	3 episodes
2019	Doctors	Anya Deriada	Episode: "Remorse"
2019	Grantchester	Mya Lyall	Series 2 (1 episode)
2019	Grenslanders (Dutch TV series)	Sister Li	Series 1 (3 episodes)
2019	Whiskey Cavalier	Michelle Ito	Episode: "Mrs. & Mr. Trowbridge"
2019	Good Omens	Pollution	Series 1 (3 episodes)
2022	Takeover	Celia	2 episodes
2022	The Sandman	Kate Fletcher	Episode: "24/7"
2024	Anansi Boys	Tara	Episode: 1.1
2026	Avatar: The Last Airbender	General Sung	4 episodes

=== Theatre ===
Year	Title	Role	Company/Venue
2002	Measure for Measure Malaya	Isabella	Riverside Studios
2004	Cruel and Tender	Cathy	Young Vic
2010	Hungry Ghosts		Orange Tree Theatre
2013	Golden Child	Siu Yong	New Diorama Theatre
2015	Hidden		Royal Court Theatre
2016	Pyongyang		Finborough Theatre
2017	Tamburlaine	Tamburlaine	New Earth Theatre
2018	Tide Whisperer	Laying	National Theatre Wales
2019	Richard II	Bagot	Shakespeare's Globe
2024	Untitled F*ck Miss Saigon Play	Multiple	Royal Exchange, Manchester

== Awards and nominations ==
Year	Award	Category	Nominated work	Result	Ref.
2016	Accolade Competition	Award of Excellence (shared with Jessica Henwick and Giles Alderson)	The Heart of the Forest	Won	
2017	Asians on Film Festival	Best Original Script (shared with Jessica Henwick)	The Heart of the Forest	Won	
2017	Asians on Film Festival	Best Best Ensemble Cast (shared)	The Heart of the Forest	Nominated	
2023	9th National Film Awards UK	Best Supporting Actress	Operation Fortune: Ruse de Guerre	Won	
