= The Troll =

2009 book by Julia Donaldson

- Author: Julia Donaldson
- Illustrator: David Roberts
- Language: English
- Genre: Children's
- Publisher: Macmillan
- Publication date: 3 July 2009
- Publication place: United Kingdom
- Pages: 32
- ISBN: 978-0-230-01793-1

The Troll by Julia Donaldson with illustrations by David Roberts is a children's story about a troll and some pirates.

== Plot ==
The troll in this story is based on the troll from the Three Billy Goats Gruff fairy tale. However, in this story, no goats ever cross the troll's bridge and he is forced to survive on fish that he catches from the river. He does encounter, in turn, a spider, a mouse and a rabbit, each of which convinces the troll not to eat them by telling him that he should try a bridge further down the river that is more suitable for capturing goats as he is "sick of fish". Meanwhile, the pirate captain Hank Chief and his crew (Peg Polkadot, Ben Buckle, and Percy Patch) are searching for the treasure that is marked on their map, but are unable to locate the correct island. The pirates also display very poor culinary skills. Eventually, the troll reaches the sea and realises that he has been tricked by the other animals; he sees what he thinks are goat tracks in the sand and sets about laying a trap for the goat in a spot not too far from the location on the pirate's treasure map. He duly discovers an old chest when digging a large hole to ensnare his prey and throws away the "round shiny objects" he finds therein. He decides to lie in wait in the chest for the goat and falls asleep. Predictably, the pirates then arrive and make off with their "treasure"; upon opening the chest the pirates decide to make the troll walk the plank, until Peg discovers the troll's frying pan and cookbook. On discovering the troll's culinary talents, they agree to spare the troll and make him their cook. The troll is delighted and proceeds to tell the pirates that he will make them his favourite goat stew only to be advised, to his horror, that all the pirates desire is fish.
