= Gruffalo Granny =

2026 children's book by Julia Donaldson

- Author: Julia Donaldson
- Illustrator: Axel Scheffler
- Language: English
- Genre: Children's
- Publisher: Macmillan
- Publication date: 10 September 2026
- Publication place: United Kingdom
- Pages: 40
- ISBN: 1-035-06551-7
- OCLC: 1576130557
- Preceded by: The Gruffalo's Child

Gruffalo Granny is a British children's picture book by writer and playwright Julia Donaldson and illustrated by Axel Scheffler. It is the sequel to both The Gruffalo and The Gruffalo's Child. The book was published on 10 September 2026.

== Plot ==
The book features a new character who is the mother of the Gruffalo.

== Background ==
In April 2025, Donaldson confirmed that a new book in The Gruffalo series would be published in September 2026. She added that she had thought of the initial concept "a long time ago", and was motivated to expand on it by the National Literacy Trust's inclusion of The Gruffalo and The Gruffalo's Child in a campaign promoting child literacy. She also cited her experience as a grandmother as inspiration for the story.

On 6 February 2026, the title of the new work was revealed as Gruffalo Granny along with a publication date of 10 September of that year. Promotion included projection of artwork by Scheffler featured in the book on the British Library and the Mitchell Library on the same day.
