= Running on the Cracks =

2009 novel by Julia Donaldson

- First edition
- Author: Julia Donaldson
- Language: English
- Genre: Young adult fiction
- Publisher: Egmont Books
- Publication date: 2009
- Publication place: United Kingdom
- Pages: 256
- ISBN: 978-1405222334

Running on the Cracks is award-winning writer Julia Donaldson's first novel aimed at a teenage audience. It was published in 2009.

== Plot ==
The story revolves around 15-year-old Leo, who runs away from her aunt and uncle's home, where she has been living since the sudden death of her musician parents. Leo is driven away by the disturbing behaviour of her uncle. She does not expect a 46-year-old touching her. She escapes to Glasgow, where she comes across a wide variety of characters, who all help her to solve the mystery of where her grandparents are.

== Development ==
Donaldson has spoken openly about how the character of Mary, who suffers from a mental illness, was inspired by the people she met while her son was in hospital.

Running on the Cracks is Donaldson's longest book.

== Recognition ==
Running on the Cracks won the Nasen Inclusive Children's Book Award 2009, and was shortlisted for the Independent Booksellers award.

- “Leo’s plight is universal and sure to attract the attention and empathy of many American teens.”—Booklist
- “This fast-paced, richly characterized Scottish import, imbued with the important message that friends are the family you choose, will be a boon to libraries looking to add more world literature to their teen collections.”—Kirkus Reviews
- “This engaging, bittersweet story follows biracial British teenager Leonora ('Leo') Watts-Chan… The fast pace and short chapters should appeal to readers, who will celebrate the hopeful ending.”—Publishers Weekly

== Adaptations ==
Running on the Cracks has been adapted for the stage by the Tron Theatre. The production toured in 2013, including a staging at the Pilot Theatre and the York Theatre Royal. The book was adapted by writer Andy Arnold, directed by Katie Posner and the lead role of Leo was performed by Jessica Henwick.

The play received positive reviews from critics, with The Guardian describing it as "gripping", The Scotsman praising the "fine performances from the five-strong cast, with Gaylie Runciman in poignant form as Mary, and Jessica Henwick outstanding as Leo", and The Times giving four stars and noting the show's "edge-of-the-seat excitement of a thriller". STV also gave four stars.
