= Three Billy Goats Gruff =

Norwegian fairy tale

The Three Billy Goats Gruff
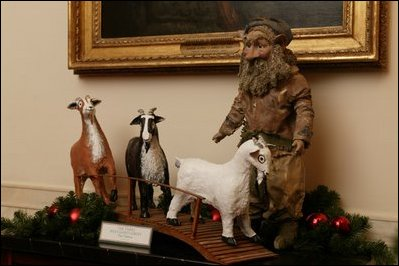
- The White House 2003 Christmas decoration using "The Three Billy Goats Gruff" as the theme

Folk tale
- Name: The Three Billy Goats Gruff
- Aarne–Thompson grouping: 122E
- Country: Norway
- Published in: Norwegian Folktales

"The Three Billy Goats Gruff" (Norwegian: De tre bukkene Bruse) is a Norwegian fairy tale collected by Peter Christen Asbjørnsen and Jørgen Moe in their Norske Folkeeventyr, first published between 1841 and 1844. It has an Aarne-Thompson type of 122E. The first version of the story in English appeared in the translation by George Webbe Dasent of some of the Norske Folkeeventyr, published as Popular Tales from the Norse in 1859. The heroes of the tale are three male goats who need to outsmart a ravenous troll to cross the bridge to their feeding ground.

== Characters ==
The story introduces three billy goats (male goats), sometimes identified as a youngster, father and grandfather, but more often described as brothers. In other adaptations, there is a baby or child goat, mama goat and papa goat.

"Bruse", the name of the goats in the original Norwegian tale, was rendered as "Gruff" in the earliest English translation, and this has been perpetuated. However, the Norwegian word in fact means "tuft of hair".

== Plot ==
Three billy goats, all named "Gruff", live in a valley with very little grass. They must walk across a bridge to reach a mountain pasture where they can graze. However, a fearsome troll lives under the bridge and eats everyone who tries to cross.

The smallest billy goat goes first. The troll stops him and threatens to "gobble him up!" The little goat tells the troll he should wait for his big brother to cross, because he is larger and would make for a more gratifying feast. The greedy troll agrees and lets the smallest goat pass.

The medium-sized billy goat approaches the bridge. He is more cautious than his brother, but the troll stops him too. The second goat convinces the troll to wait for their eldest brother, the largest of the three, and the troll lets him pass as well.

The largest billy goat steps on to the bridge and meets the troll waiting to devour him. The goat challenges the troll to fight and then throws the troll into the water using his horns. The troll drowns in the stream, and from then on the bridge is safe. The three billy goats live happily ever after.

== Retellings ==
Writer Bjørn F. Rørvik and illustrator Gry Moursund have created three books in Norwegian based on this story. The first, Bukkene Bruse på badeland (The Three Billy Goats Gruff at the Waterpark), came in 2009 and had by 2014 sold over 110,000 copies in Norway, making it one of the biggest selling picture books in the country. By March 2019, the three books had sold over 450,000 copies in Norway.

The following is a list of children's book adaptations of the story into the English language, suitable for the elementary school classroom:

- Arnold, Tim (1993) The Three Billy Goats Gruff Macmillan
- Barnett, Mac (Illustr. by Jon Klassen (2022). "The Three Billy Goats Gruff." Orchard Books.
- Brown, Marcia (1991) [1957] The Three Billy Goats Gruff. Harcourt
- Chase, Richard (Illustr. by Berkeley Williams, Jr.) (1948), "Sody Sallyraytus" in Grandfather Tales, Houghton
- Galdone, Paul (1981) [1973] The Three Billy Goats Gruff. HMH Books for Young Readers
- Langley, Jonathan (1995) The Three Billy Goats Gruff. Harper Collins
- Loewen, Nancy (Illustr. by Cristian Bernardini) (2018). Listen, my bridge is SO cool!: The Story of the Three Billy Goats Gruff as Told by the Troll. Picture Window Books
- Mortimer, Rachel (Illustr. by Liz Pichon) (2010). The Three Billy Goats Fluff. Scholastic (Note: "Scholastic-Australia")
- Ottolenghi, (Illustr. by Carol Mark Clapsadle) (2009). The Three Billy Goats Gruff. Brighter Child
- Palatini, Margie (Illustr. by Barry Moser) (2005). The Three Silly Billies. Simon & Schuster Books for Young Readers
- Patchett, Ann (Illustr. by Robin Preiss Glasser) (2020) Escape Goat. Puffin Books
- Pinkney, Jerry (2017). The Three Billy Goats Gruff. Little, Brown Books for Young Readers
- Pye, Katie (Illustr. by Rodrigo Paulo) (2020). Trip Trap Trouble: A Story about the Three Billy Goats Gruff and Gratitude. Headstart Thinking
- Rounds, Glen (1993). The Three Billy Goats Gruff. Holiday House
- S., Svend Otto (1989) The Three Billy Goats Gruff. D. C. Heath
- Shaskan, Stephen (2013) The Three Triceratops Tuff. Beach Lane Books
- Sims, Lesley (Illustr. by David Semple) (2015). Goat in a Boat. Usborne Publishing Ltd
- Stevens, Janet (1987) The Three Billy Goats Gruff. Harcourt
- Ziefert, Harriet (Illustr. by Laura Rader) (1994) The Three Billy Goats Gruff. Tambourine
- Rudin, Ellen (Ill. Lilian Obligado) (1982) The Three Billy Goats Gruff. Western Publishing Co. (a first little golden book)
- Vallejos, Angel (2026) The Three Billy Goats Gruff. Bloomsbury

Part of the story in the children's book The Troll by Julia Donaldson is based on the tale, with a troll that lives under varying bridges and waits for goats but in this story only other animals walk over the bridges.

Neil Gaiman's "Troll Bridge" (1993) in the anthology Snow White, Blood Red is also an adaption of the fairy tale, for adults. (Note: The troll approaches a young boy who has crossed his bridge and demands to "eat his life." The boy eventually persuades the troll to wait until he has lived a little more, after which he will return to the bridge. The goats in this adaptation are represented by the protagonist as a child, a teenager and finally a middle-aged man. The story was nominated for a 1994 World Fantasy Award.)

Golden Books did a version of the story that was similar to the book. The only difference is that when the troll is washed away by the stream, he is later mentioned to have moved into a cave.

== Media adaptations ==
=== Audiobooks ===
- Scholastic Corporation produced an audio recording in 1963, with music composed and directed by Arthur Rubinstein, narrated by Bob Thomas, and cover illustration by Susan Blair and Ellen Appleby. It was first made available as a phonograph record, and then on Compact Cassette.

=== Films ===
- The 3 Billy Piñatas (2015) is a version with a Spanish twist, produced by "Team Juan" at the Duncan of Jordanstone College of Art and Design at the University of Dundee

=== Television ===
- In 1995, Australian children's TV series Johnson and Friends adapted this fairy tale, with the characters 'roleplaying' and acting out the story in a humorous fashion.
- In 2004, the story is retold on Hi-5. This version has the goats replaced by sheep and instead of the troll wanting to eat them, he just wanted to sleep and was annoyed by their noise. The story ended with the biggest sheep giving him earmuffs made out of wool. In the original Australian version of the show, three sheep crossing a bridge disturb the napping bunyip underneath. (Note: "Scholastic-Australia")
- In 2008, the BBC created a modern adaptation for its Fairy Tales TV series. In this, the story was given a twist in that the troll was presented as a tragic, cruelly maligned victim.

=== Music and musicals ===
Frank Luther wrote a version of "The Three Billy Goats Gruff" geared towards music education for elementary school grade children, published in "Singing on Our Way", Our Singing World Series by the Ginn and Company (c. 1949). It was often played on the BBC Radio programme Children's Favourites, in the 1950s and early 1960s. Some years earlier Yvonne Ravell had recorded a version she wrote in sung (1940), (Note: Ravell, Yvonne [pseud. of Yvonne Rapeer Shanley] (soprano); Leaman, Harold (piano) (1940) "Little Black Sambo"; "The Gingerbread Boy"; "The Wee Wee Woman"; "The Three Billy Goats Gruff" (3 album set, J-20, Nos. 35-651, 35-652, and 35-653).) cited as suitable education material for the theatre in one journal.

A musical adaptation by British composing team George Stiles and Anthony Drewe was commissioned by the Singapore Repertory Theatre. It premiered there in 2015 and made its North American debut in 2017 at the Aurora Theatre in Lawrenceville, Georgia.

=== Play productions ===
- Lazy Bee Scripts published Billy Goat Gruff (2009), a simple play for young children.

=== Games ===
- The Three Billy Goats Gruff (2013) game adaptation for tablets and mobile phones was developed by the Norwegian game studio Agens. The game was made with support from the Norwegian Film Institute.
