= Moley =

British children's TV show

- Genre: Adventure; Comedy; Slapstick
- Created by: James Reatchlous
- Directed by: Leon Joosen
- Voices of: Warwick Davis; Jessica Henwick; Stanley Tucci; Gemma Arterton; Togo Igawa; Charles Dance; Julie Walters; Richard E. Grant
- Country of origin: United Kingdom
- No. of series: 1
- No. of episodes: 52

Production
- Producer: Tony Nottage
- Running time: 11 minutes
- Production company: Nottage Productions

Original release
- Network: Boomerang
- Release: October 4, 2021 – 2022

Moley is a British animated television series directed by Leon Joosen and produced by Tony Nottage at Nottage Productions, based on the stories written by James Reatchlous. The show revolves around Moley, an anthropomorphic mole who lives in MoleTown with his friends and other animals.

== Production and broadcast ==
Moley was initially produced as a 30-minute TV special titled Master Moley by Royal Invitation, which first aired on the WarnerMedia channel Boomerang in EMEA territories on 28 November 2020.

The TV series, titled Moley, premiered with the first 26 11-minute episodes of a 52-episode season across WarnerMedia EMEA's Boomerang channel in over 119 countries in October 2021, with a further 26 episodes due for release in the spring of 2022. In the United States, the series premiered on July 7, 2023 on Peacock. On July 13, 2023, the show started releasing episodes on the Talking Tom & Friends' YouTube channel.

The show made its free-to-air debut on Pop during Christmas 2022, starting with the special. The show was expected to fully debut on Pop in January 2023, but didn't air. In August of 2023, it became listed on the Pop website, and it began airing on October 2, 2023.

== Plot ==
The series follows Moley, a charming, optimistic young mole who lives deep in a burrow in the bustling city of MoleTown. Accompanied by a magical book named Manny, Moley travels around MoleTown learning about new mole cultures and sharing his knowledge of the human world above.

Though Moley is viewed by the citizens of MoleTown as wise and knowledgeable, he's no smarter than the average mole, and often finds himself on entertaining misadventures. His best friends Mona Lisa, Dotty, Mystic Mole, and Mishmosh always come to his rescue.

== Characters ==
- Moley, voiced by Warwick Davis
- Manny the Magic Book, voiced by Charles Dance
- Dotty, voiced by Jessica Henwick
- Mona Lisa, voiced by Gemma Arterton
- MishMosh, voiced by Stanley Tucci
- Mystic Mole, voiced by Togo Igawa
- The Gardener, voiced by Richard E. Grant
- Squirm, voiced by Brigitta Nicas
- Lester, voiced by Trevor Dion Nicholas

== Episodes ==
No.	Title
1	"Magic Rectangle"
When a cell phone falls into Roley Poley Park from the Great Above, the entire town is mesmerized by it, and Moley must break the “spell” it has on them.
2	"Guacamoley"
Moley gets in over his head when he enters a spicy chilli-eating contest, and Manny accidentally makes the chilli come alive.
3	"Three Gentlemen of MoleTown"
Moley gets in over his head when he enters a spicy chilli-eating contest, and Manny accidentally makes the chilli come alive.
4	"Who Arted"
When Dotty joins an art competition, Moley is afraid her art won't appeal to the snooty judge, so he casts a spell that causes her art to "come to life.”
5	"Trash! Trash! Trash!"
When Manny accidentally transports a heap of trash into MoleTown, Moley attempts to recycle it by fixing up the town.
6	"Groundmole Day"
Moley is given the key to the city. He has such a great day, he convinces Manny to let him repeat it.
7	"Some Like It Cool"
When MoleTown experiences a heatwave, Moley and Dotty hope MishMosh can invent something to cool things down.
8	"Molerskating Mayhem"
Moley must learn to Molerskate for the Great Mole Roll skating competition and discovers his parents have a hidden talent.
9	"Duck Moley Duck!"
When an egg rolls into MoleTown and a duckling hatches, Moley must play mama to the baby duck until they can find its home.
10	"Squirm's Day Out"
When Moley helps take care of the worms at Dotty's Adopt Worm Rescue Center, the Gardener sends Squirm to pose as a homeless worm and help him steal Manny.
11	"Wormalicious"
Moley vows to not eat worms for a few days in support of Dotty's veganism and his worm craving temptations get out of control.
12	"Keeper for a Day"
When Moley spends the day with a young mole named Cheese who wants to be just like him, Moley helps Cheese recognize his own talents and uniqueness.
13	"For All Molekind"
MishMosh builds a tunnel digger, upsetting some moles in town who believe it will replace the moles' need to dig themselves. Dotty accidentally gets locked in the machine before it gets activated.
14	"Dogzilla"
When Buttercup (the Queen's dog) digs his way down into MoleTown, he forms a bond with the Gardener.
15	"MoleTown's Got Talent"
Moley agrees to organize a town talent show, but when the level of actual “talent” in MoleTown is lacking, he worries the show will be a failure.
16	"Mr. Know It All"
Moley is frustrated with his inability to do a crossword puzzle so he casts a spell with the aim of “knowing all the answers.” The spell works, but the more knowledge he gains, the bigger and brighter his head gets (figuratively and literally).
17	"Science Fair"
Moley and his mom enter MishMosh's yearly science fair while the Gardener and Squirm plot to snag Manny.
18	"Lockdown"
Moley and Dotty find themselves trapped inside MishMosh's lab when his state-of-the-art security system is activated.
19	"Hurley Burley"
Hurley, a giant boisterous adventuring mole who boasts of dangerous stories, comes to town looking to drag Moley on one of his adventures. Frightened of being thought a coward, Moley tries to avoid him.
20	"Old Coot's Secret"
When Moley and Dotty spot Old Coot sneaking around MoleTown, Dotty can't resist following. Soon they discover his secret tunnel, but all is not what it seems.
21	"Moleder and Dotty"
When a mysterious sighting breeds rumors of aliens in MoleTown, Moley and Dotty investigate in hopes of finding the truth.
22	"Dotty's Disastrous Day"
When everything seems to be going wrong for Dotty, she takes Manny out on an adventure and runs into the Gardener, who plots to steal him.
23	"My Burrow Is Your Burrow"
When MishMosh's lab is flooded, Moley invites MishMosh to temporarily stay at his burrow. But when MishMosh proves to be a difficult houseguest by turning Moley's place into a makeshift lab, Moley's patience is tested.
24	"Molecare Plan"
After the Gardener is injured attempting to steal Manny, Moley volunteers himself and his friends to nurse the curmudgeon back to health — driving him bonkers in the process.
25	"A Book By Its Cover (Part 1)"
When Manny's damaged page is replaced with the wrong kind of page, it leads to chaos in MoleTown as all the Moles are slowly transformed into worms and Manny takes over.
26	"A Book By Its Cover (Part 2)"
With all the Moles in MoleTown transformed into worms, Moley and Dotty must hatch a plan to remove the chaotic page and rescue both Manny and the whole of MoleTown.
27	"Rally Ho"
It's the annual MoleTown Races, and each of the residents have their own unique car to compete for the grand prize. But how will Moley cope when he finds out there are no rules?
28	"Paper Molche"
Dotty discovers that Mystic has found a lost treasure map from the great above, and persuades Moley and Manny to help in the search.
29	"Mole in One"
MoleTown is becoming lazy and so Dotty helps Moley exercise, giving the Gardener an idea, he sets up a Golf Course to trap Manny, but things don't go to plan.
30	"Little Lizzie"
When Molieres travelling spectacular comes to MoleTown, it brings with it, a rather unique guest, which soon becomes very attached to Dotty.
31	"Double Oh Moley"
When Moley finds an old Movie poster about a human hero, Manny's magic conjures up an entire world of action and adventure.
32	"Mona's Monstrous Makeover"
Mona Lisa is hosting an extravagant fashion show and she wants Moley to be the guest of honour, but what will Moley wear for the show?
33	"Gardener and Mole"
Things take a dramatic turn when the Gardener and Moley magically switch places, leading to a very bored Moley and a very tired and frustrated Gardener.
34	"Moley's Wild Ride"
MoleTown has a spectacular fun fair and at its heart is a huge ferris wheel created by Mishmosh, but after Manny speeds things up, Moley has to save the day.
35	"MoleTowns a Stage"
Mrs Moley is directing a small play, with Moley cast as the hero, but his fear gets the better of him.
36	"Sidekick Roadtrip"
Moley and the Gardener each head off for a road trip, leaving Manny and Squirm home alone, but it isn't long before the two of them take an adventure of their own.
37	"Mrs. Moley's Manic Movers"
When Mrs. Moley needs a wardrobe picking up from Miss Petunia, Moley and Dotty must figure out how they can transport the beast from the other side of town.
38	"Camp Counsellor"
Dotty persuades Moley and Mishmosh to head out for a spot of camping, meanwhile the Gardener has his own plans.
39	"Mission Impossimole"
Mystic Mole leaves Moley and Dotty in charge of the temple, meanwhile the Gardener hatches an ingenious plan to get his hands on Manny!
40	"The Beast of James Bay"
Moley and Dotty must track down the mysterious Beast of James Bay, meanwhile, the Gardener uses this opportunity to try out his new creature disguise to try and trap Manny.
41	"It's a Molevelous Life"
It's the anniversary of Cafe Moley. But Lester isn't feeling himself, Moley conjures up a spell and they get sucked into Manny and go on a journey through Lester's past.
42	"Mud Molevelous Mud"
All of MoleTown goes into a cleaning frenzy after Moley tries to explain why humans in the Great Above think dirt is dirty!
43	"The Ambassador"
Moley tries to impress the new ambassador from MoleTown's sister city, Moledonia, meanwhile the Gardener has schemed up a free tour in order to get his hands on Manny.
44	"The Abominable Snowmole"
It's winter in MoleTown and a mysterious snowy creature is roaming the Big Below, the Gardener uses this as the perfect opportunity to try and scare Moley.
45	"Beach Blanket Moley"
All of MoleTown enjoys a day at the beach. But when they found out Mona Lisa can't swim, Mishmosh comes to the rescue with his new submarine invention!
46	"The Hat Trick"
MoleTown's orchestra is performing, and everyone is impressed with Milo's new hat until Moley accidentally breaks it.
47	"The Great Mole Detective"
When the Gardener finally gets his hands on Manny, Moley and Dotty are on his trail, so he dresses up as the world's greatest Mole detective and lead them away from the clues.
48	"Moles of Futures Past"
Mishmosh's new de-aging device causes trouble when it accidentally zaps Miss Petunia and Old Coot into their younger selves.
49	"The Big Below, Below the Big Below"
Moley and Dotty go on a wild adventure after getting transformed into worms!
50	"Molbert Brainstein"
When Mishmosh falls ill and is unable to compete in MoleTown's greatest inventor competition, Moley and Dotty must dress up and compete in his place.
51	"A Mole in Time"
52	"A Mole in Time"
It's the anniversary of Moley becoming the keeper of Manny. Dotty ends up stuck in the past and with nobody recognising her, goes to her uncle for help and they must work together to bring her back to present-day MoleTown!
