= Holiday Special =

Holiday Special may refer to:

- "Holiday special," a television special broadcast based upon and aired leading up to a specific holiday:
  - List of Christmas television specials
  - List of Easter television specials
  - List of Halloween television specials
  - List of St. Patrick's Day television specials
  - List of Thanksgiving television specials
  - List of Valentine's Day television specials
- "Holiday Special" (South Park), a 2017 TV episode
- Star Wars Holiday Special, a 1978 TV special
