= Obsession: Dark Desires =

British TV series (2014–2020)

- Genre: Docudrama, Biography
- Created by: October Films
- Countries of origin: United Kingdom; United States
- Original language: English
- No. of seasons: 5
- No. of episodes: 42

Production
- Executive producer: Jeanie Vink
- Running time: 60 minutes (with adverts)
- Production company: October Films

Original release
- Network: Investigation Discovery
- Release: 14 January 2014 – 19 January 2020

Obsession: Dark Desires is a true crime television series whose first episode aired on 14 January 2014. The series initial run of four seasons ran from 2014–17, later returning for the 2019–20 television season.

The show dramatizes real life accounts from people who have been the victim of stalking.

== Production ==
The series was announced by the network Investigation Discovery (ID) in March 2013. It is an original production for British company October Films.

Jane Latman, senior VP of development at Investigation Discovery, said stalking was a very important issue and October Films series would "expertly profile the courage and tenacity of the victims to give viewers a visceral portrayal of survivors' harrowing experiences."

The series was produced by executive producer Jeanie Vink and producer Meghan Keener for Investigation Discovery and co-executive produced by Alex Sutherland, Steve Murphy, Matt Robins and Denman Rooke for October Films. The series was directed by Tom Keeling, Jim Greayer, Jamie Crawford and Fergus Colville.

In April 2013, Cineflix announced that it had signed a two-year first-look deal to all of production company October Films new programming, which includes Obsession: Dark Desires.

The series debuted on the Investigation Discovery network on 14 January 2014. Shortly afterwards, it was picked up by the United Kingdom-based version of the Crime & Investigation channel, for transmission in Europe.

After a two-year hiatus, the series returned to Investigation Discovery for a fifth season in December 2019.

== Episodes ==
=== Season 1 (2014) ===
No. overall	No. in season	Title	Original release date
1	1	"Paging Sarah"	14 January 2014
A young, single mother's co-worker is found raped and murdered and she fears that she is next.
2	2	"Hiding in Plain Sight"	21 January 2014
A pregnant woman receives threatening phone calls from an obsessed pizza delivery man, and worries that her and her baby's life are in danger.
3	3	"Help Wanted"	28 January 2014
A hired hand becomes obsessed with his employer.
4	4	"Screams in the Desert"	4 February 2014
A woman deals with years of mental torture, death threats and stalking.
5	5	"Number One Fan"	11 February 2014
A man masquerading as a musical sponsor turns Opera singer, Leandra Ramm's life into a nightmare.
6	6	"Just a Wall Away"	18 February 2014
A move reveals a terrifying experience.
7	7	"Serenade of a Stalker"	25 February 2014
A customer with an obsession shatters a 33 year old's life with unprovoked violence.
8	8	"Silent Scream"	4 March 2014
Jane Jeong Trenka turns down advances of a fellow student; Jim retaliates by doing a video project that will have a deadly conclusion.
9	9	"Southern Wild"	11 March 2014
Collette Dwyer, 36-year-old single mother believes Derrick Todd Lee, who has been stalking her at home and work, is a serial killer.
10	10	"Crushed"	18 March 2014
Kathleen's teenage crush turns into an obsession; her stalker tries to transform his darkest fantasies into reality.

=== Season 2 (2015) ===
No. overall	No. in season	Title	Original release date
11	1	"Unlucky Seven"	6 January 2015
Heather, a grocery store barista, has just begun dating her most recent hire, Arturo. But as time goes by, Arturo is unable to hide his dark side. His obsession with Heather comes at the expense of their relationship, his job – and her life.
12	2	"Rose-Colored Glasses"	13 January 2015
When 17-year-old Rose moves out of her parents' home, she is excited to expand her horizons. She soon meets 21-year-old Mike, who introduces her to the world of punk music and parties. But when he turns violent, Rose gets caught up in his obsessive trap.
13	3	"Mad For Teacher"	20 January 2015
Linda, a special ed teacher, has taught Todd for years. Now 17 with learning problems and a temper, Todd only wants Linda to teach him. Torn between helping him and protecting herself, Linda's world turns upside down when Todd's obsession comes knocking.
14	4	"Cornered"	27 January 2015
In spring 2003, 37-year-old single mother Karen Richardt has a chance meeting with her Brooklyn neighbor Carlito Perez. But when Karen tries to distance herself, no one could have predicted the deadly cycle of violence he would unleash.
15	5	"Occult Following"	3 February 2015
Krystal is a teacher and practicing Pagan living happily with her husband Bill. When she takes part in a local Wiccan-themed TV show, she catches the eye of the show's host. As his keen interest turns into obsession, he vows to claim her as his own.
16	6	"Apocalypse Now"	10 February 2015
41-year-old single mother Patty is excited about a new chapter in her life when she begins dating one of her customers, Vietnam veteran Dale. But when Dale becomes violent on their first date, Patty is quickly sent into a desperate struggle for survival.
17	7	"SOS SMS"	17 February 2015
Hardworking nurse Tara opens a chilling text from a nameless sender; someone who knows her and means her harm. As she fights to protect herself and her family from this invisible enemy, she begins to question everyone – especially those closest to her.
18	8	"Home Sweet Hell"	24 February 2015
Everything is looking up for 27-year-old Kisha Kelly after she buys her first home in Dallas, Texas. But within days of moving in, she encounters the former owner of the property and immediately realizes he has taken on a deadly obsession.
19	9	"Multiple Personalities"	3 March 2015
When attorney Marc successfully defends a client, he has no idea that her gratitude will soon become a nightmare. Marc's ex-client causes chaos and suffering in a terrifying mission to win his affection.
20	10	"Going Postal"	10 March 2015
When Kim accepts a ride to the fair from a quiet co-worker, she has no idea that she will become the center of a terrifying campaign of stalking, harassment, and obsession.

=== Season 3 (2016) ===
No. overall	No. in season	Title	Original release date
21	1	"Garden of Evil"	9 February 2016
A young single mom accepts a phone number from a landscaper, only to have him stalk and harass her for the next year.
22	2	"Exposed"	16 February 2016
When young professional Hannah Arbuckle moves into the house of her dreams, her privacy is shattered after a mysterious man begins filming her through her window. As his obsessive and threatening behavior escalates, she gambles on a violent confrontation to save her life.
23	3	"A Dangerous Mind"	23 February 2016
When senior psychiatric nurse Maria Jordan fires disgruntled- junior nurse Denis Czajkowski, it triggers an all-consuming and violent obsession that will result in a hostage siege and innocent lives being lost.
24	4	"Burning Love"	1 March 2016
Yvette and Roger's marriage has broken down but Roger can't stand to see Yvette with another man and decides she must die -- in front of all her colleagues. If he can't have her, then no one will.
25	5	"The Devil in the Pews"	8 March 2016
To fellow parishioners of his Mormon church, Bill is a reformed convict. But when he meets Jennifer, the Bishop's 18 year old daughter, he becomes obsessed. By day, he sends her thousands of cards and gifts. By night, he digs out his basement, determined to make Jennifer his, forever.
26	6	"Beauty in the Bronx"	15 March 2016
Ramon is muscular, good looking and charming too. For 20 year old trainee pharmacist Evimer, it is an irresistible combination. But Ramon quickly reveals a possessive side and his violent episodes soon leave Evimer fighting for her life.
27	7	"Cross Your Heart & Hope to Die"	22 March 2016
Sarah is dating a young, handsome pastor but soon discovers her preacher man is hiding unholy secrets on a biblical scale. He is prepared to silence Sarah and her whole family to stop her leaving him.
28	8	"Campaign Trail of Fears"	29 March 2016
Kathleen's husband, Bob Krueger, is running for Senate in Texas. When they hire a private aircraft to take them on the campaign trail, the pilot, Tom Humphrey, becomes increasingly obsessed with Kathleen. Now he'll do anything to destroy her husband and make her his, including using his plane as a deadly weapon.
29	9	"Final Fantasy"	5 April 2016
Kaylyn is an introverted high school student, bullied by the popular kids and struggling to fit in. But then she finds the perfect soulmate in newcomer Paul. Sharing a passion for comics and escapism, they fall in love but when Kaylyn starts a new life at college, Paul becomes increasingly jealous. Unable to contain his simmering rage, Paul will turn his car into a deadly weapon and leave Kaylyn's life hanging by a thread.
30	10	"There's Something About Mary Lynn"	12 April 2016
Single mom Mary Lynn Witherspoon falls for divorcee Edmonds, but early on she realizes there is something not quite right about his 10 year old son, Tennent. What she doesn't know is that Tennent doesn't just like Mary Lynn, he wants to become her. It's the beginning of a terrifying 22 year obsession that will devastate both families. Note: This is the only episode with a tragic ending for the victim. Mary Lynn is played by an actress.

=== Season 4 (2017) ===
No. overall	No. in season	Title	Original release date
31	1	"The Salon Stalker"	27 February 2017
When Idaho hairdresser Makaela Zabel-Gravatt begins cutting the hair of truck driver Christopher Wirfs, little does she realize that it signals the start of a two-year long nightmare that will end in the most heart-stopping and disturbing way.
32	2	"High School Reunion"	7 March 2017
When single mother of two Latasha Edwards bumps into her old schoolmate Dammon, she thinks she's met her soul mate. But his charm hides a possessive, violent man. After they separate, Dammon's obsession deepens and Latasha fights to protect her family.
33	3	"The Olympic Creep"	13 March 2017
When Olympic gold medallist Sheila Taormina agrees to help wannabe triathlete James Ludham, she doesn't know he wants more than just coaching. His dark fantasies take over her life until she has no other choice but to face him, and her fears, head on.
34	4	"Texts, Lies, and Videotape"	20 March 2017
Katie Call's life spirals into a terrifying nightmare as her ex, Todd, refuses to accept the collapse of their relationship. Without her knowing, he hides video cameras & microphones in her home, biding his time to wreak a bloody revenge.
35	5	"Married to the Devil"	27 March 2017
Christine's life with abusive husband Shane is a constant cycle of fear, humiliation and violence. When she finally escapes with her kids, Shane sets off in pursuit, kicking off a series of terrifying and shocking events leading to a bloody conclusion.
36	6	"A Man and His Gun"	3 April 2017
Michelle has ended her relationship with alcoholic Richard and is looking forward to getting on with her life. But Richard can't let go and as his obsession grows deeper it's clear their lives will be ripped apart by the violent consequences.

=== Season 5 (2019–20) ===
No. overall	No. in season	Title	Original release date
37	1	"The Good Neighbor"	15 December 2019
Excited about a fresh start, young single mom Savannah and her son move to a new neighborhood. When her seemingly friendly next-door neighbor offers her help, she has no idea that a dangerous obsession will grow on the other side of her wall.
38	2	"The Stalker's Imagination"	22 December 2019
When Katerina leaves her husband, he fights back in imaginative ways to cause her pain, including getting Katerina locked up for a crime she hasn't committed. Katerina must do the unthinkable if she wants to escape forever.
39	3	"Friend Request"	29 December 2019
When single mom Rosita accepts a stranger's friend request, she has no idea he's hiding a terrifying secret that will lead to a deadly game of cat and mouse.
40	4	"Cabin in the Woods"	5 January 2020
Sandra never expected such extreme reprisals from Norman, a man she once called her partner. But when her daughter is caught in the crosshairs, no one can predict how far Norman will go.
41	5	"Fixer Upper"	12 January 2020
Following her divorce, Cristi buys a new home that needs work. Hoping handyman Curtis can fix it up, she ends up getting more than she bargained for. Curtis becomes fixated with Cristi and will stop at nothing until she becomes his.
42	6	"Can't Let Go"	19 January 2020
When 18-year-old Misty falls in love with a man nearly 15 years her senior, Misty's parents warn against the relationship. But no one could predict the danger Misty is in, or how this man will change all their lives forever.
