= Jane Jeong Trenka =

Korean activist (b. 1972)

- Born: 1972 (age 53–54); Seoul, Korea
- Education: Augsburg University
- Occupations: Activist, writer

Jane Jeong Trenka (born 1972) is a South Korean adoptee rights activist and an award-winning writer. She is the president of the organization TRACK (Truth and Reconciliation for the Adoption Community of Korea).

== Early life ==
Trenka was born in Seoul, South Korea in 1972. When she was six months old, Trenka and her sister were adopted into an American family in rural northern Minnesota. Her Korean mother found her daughters in 1972, shortly after the girls were sent to the U.S. and before they were legally adopted. Trenka reunited with her birth mother in South Korea in 1995 when she was 23. In 2004, she returned to live in Korea. While applying for a visa in 2006, Trenka discovered that the Korean adoption agency that had overseen her adoption had lied, both about her background and about the people who were going to adopt her. Trenka became an activist for standard and transparent adoption practices to protect the human rights of adult adoptees, children, and families. She officially repatriated to South Korea in 2008.

== Career and education ==
Trenka received a degree in music performance from Augsburg University in Minneapolis, Minnesota and became a piano teacher in Minnesota before her return to Korea.

While studying at Augsburg University, Trenka was consistently stalked, and she has spoken publicly about her experience in order to raise awareness to the issue, including discussing the incident in her book The Language of Blood. Her experiences were adapted for an episode of the Investigation Discovery series Obsession: Dark Desires.

In 2013, Trenka attended Seoul National University to pursue a degree in public administration.

She has written two memoirs on her experiences with international, transracial adoption: The Language of Blood and Fugitive Visions: An Adoptee's Return to Korea.

== Works ==
- The Language of Blood, Minnesota Historical Society Press, 2003; Graywolf Press, 2005
- 피의 언어, Y-Gelli Press 2005; Domabaem 2012
- Outsiders Within: Writing on Transracial Adoption, South End Press, 2006
- 인종간 입양의 사회학, KoRoot Press, 2012
- Fugitive Visions: An Adoptee's Return to Korea, Graywolf Press, 2009
- 덧없는 환영들, Changbi Publishers, 2012

== Awards ==
- Minnesota Book Award for Autobiography/Memoir for The Language of Blood
- Minnesota Book Award for New Voice for The Language of Blood
- Barnes & Noble Discover Great New Writers Selection for The Language of Blood

== See also ==
- List of Asian American writers
