= The Gruffalo =

1999 children's book by Julia Donaldson

- Front cover of the first edition
- Author: Julia Donaldson
- Illustrator: Axel Scheffler
- Language: English
- Genre: Children's fantasy
- Publisher: Macmillan (UK)/Viking Children's Books (US)
- Publication date: 23 March 1999
- Publication place: United Kingdom
- Pages: 32
- ISBN: 0-333-71093-2
- OCLC: 59379845
- Followed by: The Gruffalo's Child
- Website: gruffalo.com

The Gruffalo is a children's picture book by the English author Julia Donaldson, illustrated by Axel Scheffler. It tells the story of a mouse strolling in a wood and encountering a series of predators culminating in the fictional 'Gruffalo'. The Gruffalo was first published in 1999 in Britain by Macmillan Children's Books. It is about 700 words long and is written in rhyming couplets featuring repetitive verse. It is an example of a trickster story and was inspired by a Chinese folk tale called "The Fox that Borrows the Terror of a Tiger". The book has sold over 13.5 million copies and has won several prizes for children's literature, including the Nestlé Smarties Book Prize.

It has been adapted into plays and an Academy Award-nominated animated film. The book has inspired a range of merchandise, a commemorative coin, a theme park ride in Chessington World of Adventures in England, and a series of woodland trails. In 2004 & 2026, The Gruffalo was followed by two sequels, The Gruffalo's Child and Gruffalo Granny, also written by Donaldson and illustrated by Scheffler.

== Context ==
=== Author and illustrator ===
Julia Donaldson is an author of children's books, the most famous of which being The Gruffalo. Before writing The Gruffalo, Donaldson had a background in drama and performance. She studied drama at the University of Bristol and then busked in Europe and the United States. She began her career as a writer by writing children's songs for television programmes. In 1993, one of her songs that she sang and performed with her husband—"A Squash and Squeeze", about an elderly lady with a small house—was turned into a book, published by Methuen and illustrated by Axel Scheffler. Scheffler was born and grew up in Germany before moving to Britain to study art. He first worked with Donaldson on A Squash and Squeeze, published in 1993.

=== Creating the book ===
In an interview in the book The Way We Write (2006), Donaldson writes that although "It can take months or years for the germination of a book ... writing The Gruffalo probably took two weeks, with all the rewriting". She said that writing the second half of the book was difficult and almost forced her to stop altogether. Donaldson said that she had admired Scheffler's illustrations for A Squash and Squeeze, and when her publisher did not suggest he would also be illustrating The Gruffalo, she sent him the text of the book herself. Scheffler showed the text to Macmillan, who were his publisher at the time and subsequently published the book.

== Plot ==
A small, clever mouse takes a walk through a deep, dark wood in search of food. Along the way, he encounters three hungry animals—a fox, an owl, and finally a snake—each of whom invites him to their home for a meal. However, the mouse realizes that each invitation is a trick to eat him. To outsmart them, he invents a mysterious creature called a Gruffalo, describing his sharp teeth, claws, and other fearsome features. He tells each predator that he is on his way to meet the dangerous beast, scaring them into letting him go.

However, after getting rid of the snake, the mouse suddenly comes face-to-face with the real Gruffalo, a beast who looks exactly as what the mouse had described. The Gruffalo, much to the mouse’s horror, declares that a small mouse like him would make a tasty meal. Coming up with another clever trick, the mouse confidently tells the Gruffalo that he is actually the scariest creature in the entire forest. To prove it, he suggests that they take a walk together. As they stroll through the woods, they pass the fox, the owl, and the snake, who all see the Gruffalo and flee in terror. The Gruffalo, now convinced that the mouse must be truly fearsome, becomes frightened himself. When the mouse boldly declares that his favorite food is "Gruffalo crumble", the terrified monster runs away, leaving the mouse victorious. Alone once more, the mouse finally sits down to enjoy his well-earned snack—a nut—and smiles to himself, knowing that he has outwitted everyone in the forest.

== Themes ==
=== Humour ===
In an article titled "Humour and the locus of control in 'The Gruffalo'", Betsie van der Westhuizen identifies the following types of humour used in The Gruffalo: "humour with regard to the narrative aspects, humour with regard to the poetic aspects, visual humour and humour and the performing arts". She writes that the most common use of humour in the story is incongruity, arising from the sense that "everything is not as it should be". Some examples include the mouse averting the predators and the unusual descriptions of food, such as "owl ice cream" and "scrambled snake". She writes that there are different experiences of humour among different ages of children who read The Gruffalo: three to five year olds will appreciate the elements of surprise and repetition in the story; six to eight year olds will enjoy the rhyme and rhythm of the text and the story's hyperbole. As for visual representations of humour, van der Westhuizen writes that an example occurs when the mouse scares away the snake, accompanied by fragmented images of the imaginary gruffalo's features, then immediately afterwards comes across the real Gruffalo.

Mice often feature as the main character in stories for children, and one key characteristic of the animal in this context is humour. Both Ghassan Fadhil Radhi and van der Westhuizen write that children relate to the character of the mouse who triumphs in difficult situations, along with the humour that is a key element of many mouse stories.

=== Chinese folk tale ===
Donaldson has said that the story of The Gruffalo was inspired by a Chinese folk tale known as "The Fox that Borrows the Terror of a Tiger" (狐假虎威). The folk tale is about a hungry tiger who tries to catch a fox. The fox is clever and tells the tiger that God has made the fox king of all animals. Whilst accompanying the fox, the tiger notices that other animals run away in fear. Not realising that they are actually running away from the tiger, the tiger believes that fox is indeed a feared king. Donaldson was originally going to have the beast in her book be a tiger, but was unable to think of rhymes for "tiger" so instead invented a new word—"gruffalo".

The Taiwanese translator of The Gruffalo recommended the book for publication in Traditional Chinese because he noticed the story bore resemblance to the traditional tale. Teachers have used this translated book to demonstrate a modern retelling of the Chinese folk tale. In an article on the traditional Chinese translation of The Gruffalo in Taiwan, Chen-Wei Yu writes that the "resourcefulness" of the mouse in Donaldson's story represents a Western association with "individual autonomy" and "self-achievement", whereas the fox in the original fable is to be looked down upon because it does not accept its correct place in society nor an individual's obligation to others. This latter interpretation of the story has led the phrase "The Fox that Borrows the Terror of a Tiger" to mean someone who makes use of another person's power for their own gain.

== Writing style ==
The Gruffalo is a short children's story around 700 words long. It is intended to be read aloud as it is written for a target audience of children who do not know or are learning how to read. It is written in rhyming couplets in primarily dactylic tetrameter. This is a relatively uncommon metre, consisting of one stressed syllable followed by two unstressed syllables, for instance:

Come	and	have	lunch	in	my	un-	der-	ground	house
–	◡	◡	–	◡	◡	–	◡	◡	–

The rhythm of the text is broken at key points in the story. For example, when the mouse announces that he is going to meet the gruffalo "here, by these rocks", the pause on the word "here" lets the reader know the importance of the location and makes them more likely to remember it when the mouse and Gruffalo return there later in the story. The rhythm is broken again after the mouse fools the predators and sees the Gruffalo for the first time, saying "Oh, help! Oh, no! It's a gruffalo!"

To create a satisfying rhyming scheme for the story, Donaldson tried a few different names for the creature that would eventually become the Gruffalo.

So I had my plot, but I couldn't get any good couplet, like 'Silly old fox! You ought to know, you really should, / There aren't any tigers in this wood.' Something like that just didn't seem very strong. So then I thought if the mouse were going to meet some made-up creature, it would be much easier for me to write about it. I have just looked at my notes, and see that at first I thought the creature could be a 'snargle' or 'stroog' or 'tiglophant' (I must have been thinking at one stage of having it a cross between a tiger and an elephant). Then I finally thought of the lines, 'Silly old fox! Doesn't he know, / There's no such thing as a gruffalo?' I thought the word had to have three syllables, and end in 'o', and would sound fierce with 'gr' at the beginning, so gruffalo came.

— Julia Donaldson, The Way We Write: Interviews with Award-Winning Writers

In Burke's view, the name is "fittingly crafted by the author". The use of the Gr sound at the start of the name evokes negativity, harshness and discomfort, as it is a common consonant cluster in words with that connotation (for example: growl, groan, grumble). The first syllable in the name—gruff—is shared with the other children's literary characters of the Three Billy Goats Gruff. The sound of the word "Gruffalo" is used to emphasise the first time the Gruffalo is seen in the story: the mouse begins saying the sentence "Silly old snake, doesn't he know, there's no such thing as a gruffal ...", then the reader turns the page to see the picture of the Gruffalo and the mouse finishes its sentence with the exclamation "Oh!". Burke writes that this exclamation works particularly well when the text is read out loud. Van der Westhuizen writes that there is some "very subtle wordplay/manipulation of spelling" when the real Gruffalo is first introduced to make him "more specific, more substantial": from that point on in the text, "Gruffalo" is spelled with a capital 'G'; up until in the story, it was spelled with a lower case 'g'. There is typographic variation in the text, in that the Gruffalo's and predator's dialogue is written in italic font whereas the mouse's dialogue is not.

The text contains a mixture of predictable rhymes (such as mouse-house and wood-good) and unpredictable rhymes (such as toowhoo-flew). It utilises alliteration from the very start (such as "deep, dark woods" in the opening line), which gives more emphasis to the descriptions and helps children remember them more easily. The word "terrible" is repeated as an adjective to describe the Gruffalo's features (for example "terrible tusks", "terrible claws"), which Burke writes may remind readers of Where the Wild Things Are—another children's book to use the word. The Gruffalo mainly uses concrete nouns (such as "lake" and "wood") rather than abstract nouns.

== Illustrations ==
=== The Gruffalo ===
When writing the story, Donaldson did not have an exact vision of what the Gruffalo would look like. She said that she imagined he would be "more weird and less furry" than Scheffler's final illustrations. She read the story in schools prior to the book being published and invited the children to draw the Gruffalo, which resulted in creatures which she described as looking "more like aliens and less like cuddly animals". In early sketches for the book, the Gruffalo was depicted as being humanoid, troll-like, and wearing a T-shirt and trousers. The book's editor, Alison Green, said that they instead decided that the Gruffalo would look more like a woodland creature and predator, and Donaldson said the resulting illustration is "more natural looking". Scheffler's depiction of the creature relied on the physical descriptions within the text along with features which are not mentioned, such as a pair of bovine horns. He created a version of the character which is cuddly and furry but still scary. Donaldson describes the Gruffalo's appearance as a "mixture of scary but stupid". Burke writes that the image of the Gruffalo has become "iconic".

When the Gruffalo first appears in the story, he takes up a large part of the visual space on the page with strong, contrasting colours. He appears menacing with his arms raised in an attack stance, claws extended, and a drooling tongue. The mouse in comparison looks threatened, but the humorous grin of the Gruffalo—who looks directly at the audience rather than the mouse—alongside the playfulness of the text implies that the creature is less scary than he appears. As the story progresses, the Gruffalo gradually appears less menacing and more frightened. Throughout the nine visual depictions of the Gruffalo in the book, he becomes, as Burke writes, more "buffoon-like". In the penultimate picture of the Gruffalo, he holds his hand to his neck area which makes him look uncomfortable. The final picture is of the Gruffalo is him running away.

=== Setting ===
The Gruffalo is set in a forest. Scheffler was inspired by the forests in Hamburg when drawing rough initial sketches for the book. The setting contains a footpath, stream, lake, mushrooms and other wildlife. He depicts the "deep dark wood" with deep green and brown tones and dark outlines. The darkness of the hues add to the feeling of suspense when reading the story. Burke writes that the trees and tree roots are "reminiscent of the Gruffalo itself, it is as if the forest has in part spawned the creature, and they serve in the story to foreshadow what is to come". Throughout the book, the setting does not change—the illustrations at the end of the book are a mirror image of the forest at the beginning.

== Publication history ==
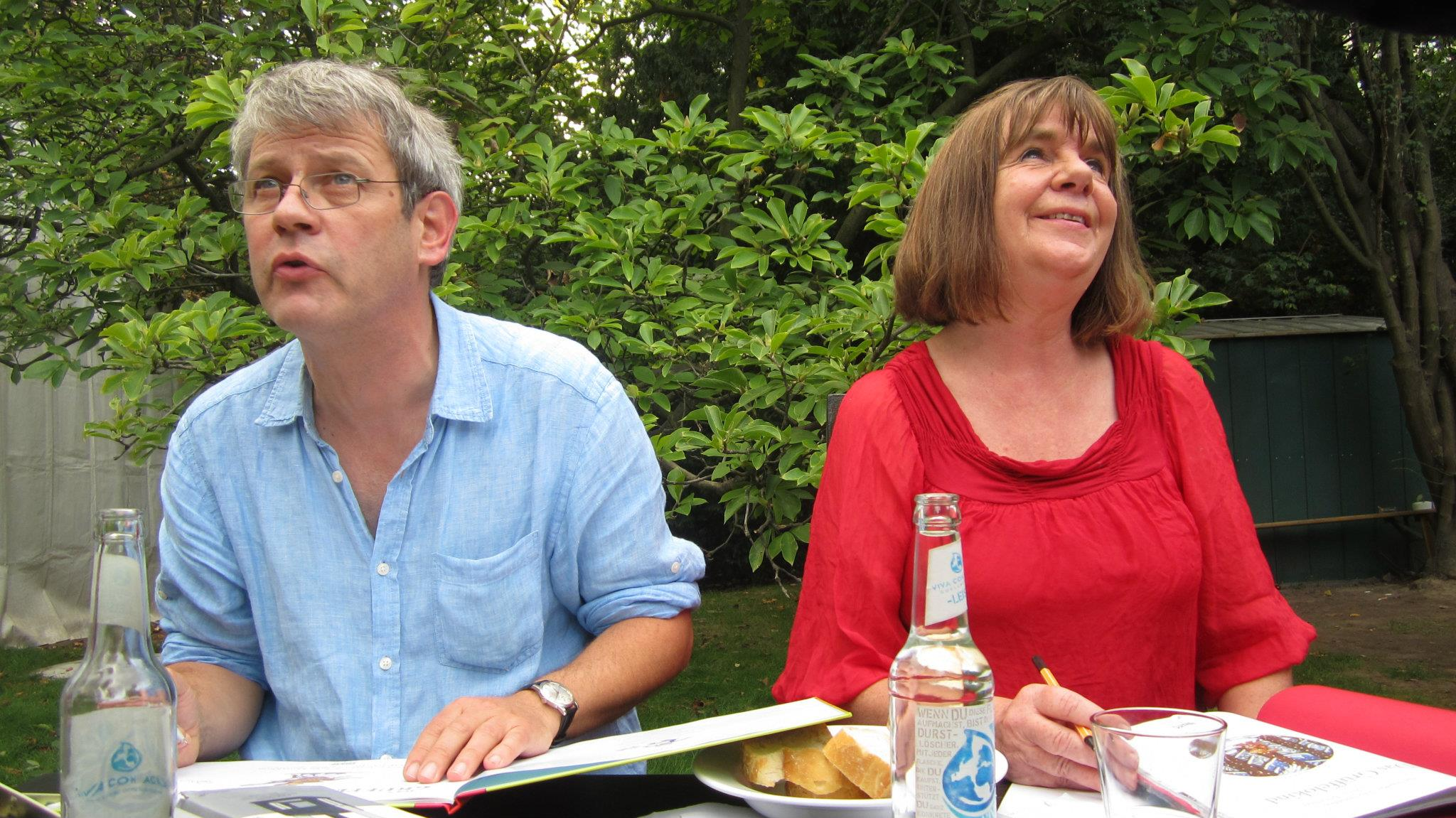
Axel Scheffler (left) and Julia Donaldson have collaborated on over 20 best-selling books together.

The Gruffalo was published by Macmillan in 1999—a year after its completion. An audiobook version, narrated by Imelda Staunton, was released in 2002 and a jigsaw book version was published in 2004. The "Gruffalo song" was released with the audiobook on a musical CD with other songs from Donaldson's books. Scheffler and Donaldson continued to work together in an author-illustrator partnership and as of 2022 have created over 20 best-selling books. In 2019, 20 years after the publication of The Gruffalo, over 13.5 million copies had been sold. It has been translated into more than 100 languages, including Cornish, multiple dialects of Scots, Guernésiais, and Latin. The sequel to the book by Donaldson and Scheffler—The Gruffalo's Child—was published in 2004. It tells the story of the Gruffalo's daughter discovering the mouse after hearing stories about it from her father. Allusions to the Gruffalo character appear in several other books by Donaldson and Scheffler.

=== Select translations ===
- German: Der Grüffelo. Translated by Monika Osberghaus. Weinheim: Beltz & Gelberg. 1999. ISBN 3-407-79230-1.
- Welsh: Y Gryffalo. Translated by Gwynne Williams. Whitchurch: Gwasg y Dref Wen. 1999. ISBN 9781855963443.
- Czech: Gruffalo. Translated by Erika Stařecká. Prague: Svojtka & Co. 2000. ISBN 978-80-256-1476-1.
- Russian: Груффало, romanized: Gruffalo. Translated by Marina Boroditskaya. Moscow: Mashiny tvoreniya. 2000. ISBN 5-902918-03-0.

== Adaptations ==
=== Film ===
The book has been adapted into a 30 minute animated film, which was broadcast on BBC One in the UK on 25 December 2009. This version features Robbie Coltrane in the title role, James Corden as the mouse, Helena Bonham Carter as the mother squirrel narrator, John Hurt as the Owl, Tom Wilkinson as the Fox and Rob Brydon as the Snake. The production was animated at Studio Soi in Germany and produced through Magic Light Pictures. It was nominated for an Academy Award for Best Short Film (Animated) in 2011. The film was nominated for a BAFTA in 2010.

=== Theatre ===
The Gruffalo has been adapted for the stage by Tall Stories theatre company, premiering in 2001. The production has toured the West End, Broadway, and Sydney Opera House. A review in The Scotsman says that the play "develops Donaldson's words with perfect understanding". A review in British Theatre praises the "dynamic movements in all the scenes", including fourth wall breaks, but writes that the musical numbers and scenery are not as inspiring. The Gruffalo has also been adapted for the stage by Dutch theatre company Meneer Monster.

== Legacy ==
A range of official The Gruffalo merchandise includes clothing, accessories, games, and soft toys. A Gruffalo Woodland Trail was opened on 31 March 2012 at the Dean Heritage Centre in the Forest of Dean. The trail depicts scenes and characters from the book carved by chainsaw artists. Other Gruffalo-themed woodland walks and trails have been established in Great Britain, including those at Kilmardinny Loch in Bearsden, Mount Vernon Park in Glasgow, Ardkinglas in Argyll, Whinlatter Forest Park in Cumbria, and several locations managed by Forestry England. In 2017, Chessington World of Adventures opened The Gruffalo River Ride Adventure after securing a licensing deal with the studio Magic Light Pictures, which created The Gruffalo film. This ride replaced the park's Bubbleworks Ride. Another ride based on Donaldson's book, and Magic Light Picture's film, Room on the Broom was also opened.

Sterling silver, gold, and UK 50p commemorative coins featuring "The Gruffalo" were issued in 2019 to mark the 20th anniversary of the book's publication. The coins were not introduced into general circulation, but were sold through the Royal Mint website. The 50p coins sold out within a day of being released. The same year, characters from the book featured on a series of UK postage stamps issued by the Royal Mail.

=== Awards ===
The Gruffalo won the Nestlé Smarties Book Prize and Blue Peter Book Award's Best Book to Read Aloud. In November 2009 the book was voted "best bedtime story" by listeners of BBC Radio 2. In a survey by the British charity Booktime in 2010, the book came first in a list of children's favourite books.
