= The Gruffalo's Child =

Book by Julia Donaldson

- First edition cover.
- Author: Julia Donaldson
- Illustrator: Axel Scheffler
- Language: English
- Genre: Children's
- Publisher: Macmillan
- Publication date: 3 September 2004
- Publication place: United Kingdom
- Pages: 32
- ISBN: 978-1-4050-2045-9
- OCLC: 56537100
- Preceded by: The Gruffalo
- Followed by: Gruffalo Granny

The Gruffalo's Child is a British children's picture book by writer and playwright Julia Donaldson, illustrated by Axel Scheffler. It is the bestselling sequel to The Gruffalo and won the 2005 National Book Awards Children's Book of the Year. The book has been adapted into theatrical productions since 2005 and was adapted into the 2011 animated film The Gruffalo's Child. A sequel titled Gruffalo Granny was released on 10 September 2026.

== Plot ==
The story is about the Gruffalo's daughter who, despite her father's warning, sets off into the deep dark wood to find the "big bad mouse", the only thing her father is afraid of. The Gruffalo cannot remember what he looks like and describes him as a monster.

During her winter journey, she encounters the tracks of the snake, the owl, and the fox from the previous story, each of whom she first suspects to be the "big bad mouse", but who in turn tell her where she can find the real "big bad mouse". Eventually, concluding she has been tricked by the animals (and perhaps her father), she sadly decides that she "doesn't believe in the 'big bad mouse".

At this point, she encounters the little mouse from The Gruffalo, who previously tricked her father and whom her father and the animals were talking about. When she threatens to eat him, he cunningly invites her to meet the "big bad mouse", which he re-creates by using moonlight to project a tremendously enlarged and fearsome shadow to scare her away. Believing the shadow to belong to the real "big bad mouse", the Gruffalo's child flees and returns to the Gruffalo cave with faith in her father restored.

The story repeats the "brains over brawn" theme, the creatures, and the easily flowing rhyme scheme (tetrameter) of its predecessor, The Gruffalo.

== Background ==
The mouse's shadow appearing enlarged is not something that would occur in the real world; Axel Scheffler has described this as "the greatest challenge" while illustrating, and comments, "Somehow it looks real in the book - even though it defies all the laws of physics!"

== Reception ==
According to BookTrust, the book "has all the charm of the original: a witty, rhyming text, enchanting illustrations and a neat reversal of the original plot." According to a review in The Horn Book Magazine, "Scheffler's humorous, cartoonlike illustrations, which depict the Gruffalo and his child as more teddy-bear-like than monstrous, work well with Donaldson’s pleasingly repetitive text in rhyme to create a story that, like its small hero, is clever rather than truly scary." A Publishers Weekly review includes, "Scheffler's amiable depiction of the baby gruffalo in "the deep dark wood" builds up plenty of empathy for the galumphing youngster, who finally meets the mouse hero of the first Gruffalo tale." A review in School Library Journal states, "While children may appreciate the details (the stick doll, snake tracks in the snow, gruffalo child's cave drawings) in the art, lack of change from picture to picture and in perspective diminish its effectiveness."

== Adaptations ==
The book was adapted for the stage in 2005, and has toured around the United Kingdom since then.

The book was also adapted into the 2011 animated film The Gruffalo's Child.

=== Translations ===
- Hebrew: טרופותי הבת, romanized: Trofoti HaBet. Translated by Rimona De-Nur. Shoham: Kinneret Zmora-Bitan Dvir. 2005.
- Russian: Дочурка Груффало, romanized: Dochurka Gruffalo. Translated by Marina Boroditskaya. Moscow: Machinyi Tvoreniya. 2006.
