= Julia Donaldson =

British writer and playwright (born 1948)

Dame Julia Donaldson DBE
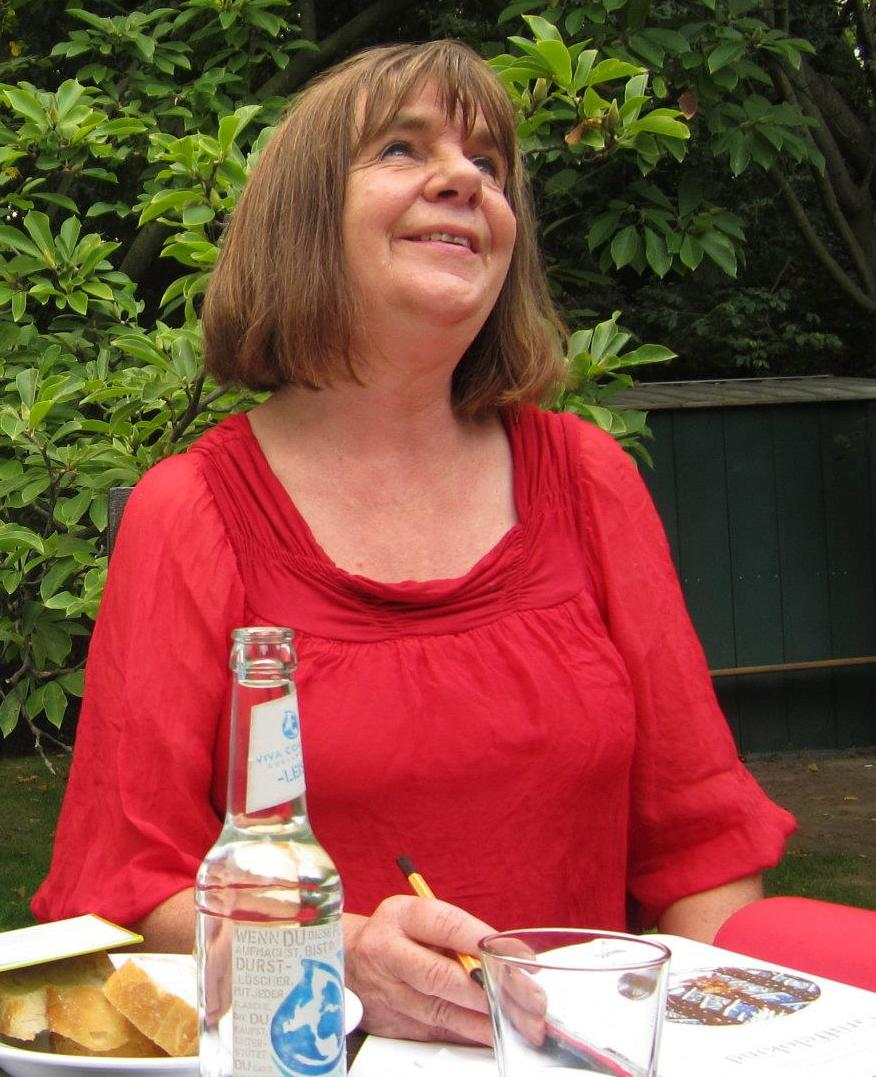
- Donaldson at the 2011 Children´s and Young Adult Program of the Berlin International Literature Festival
- Born: Julia Catherine Shields; 16 September 1948 (age 78); Hampstead, London, England
- Education: University of Bristol
- Occupations: Writer, playwright
- Spouse: Malcolm Donaldson (m. 1972; died 2024)
- Children: 3 (1 deceased)
- Relatives: Lola Young (great-niece)
- Writing career
- Period: 1993–present
- Genres: Children's fiction, drama, and songs (retail and schools markets)
- Notable works: The Gruffalo; Room on the Broom; Stick Man; Superworm
- Julia Donaldson's voice from the BBC programme Desert Island Discs, 15 November 2009.
- Website: www.juliadonaldson.co.uk

Dame Julia Catherine Donaldson DBE (née Shields; born 16 September 1948 London, England), is a British writer and playwright, and the 2011–2013 Children's Laureate. She is best known for her popular rhyming stories for children, especially those illustrated by Axel Scheffler, which include The Gruffalo, Room on the Broom, Stick Man, and Superworm. She originally wrote songs for children's television but has concentrated on writing books since the words of one of her songs, "A Squash and a Squeeze", were made into a children's book in 1993. Of her 184 published works, 64 are widely available in bookshops. The remaining 120 are intended for school use and include her Songbirds phonic reading scheme, which is part of the Oxford University Press's Oxford Reading Tree. In January 2025, Donaldson became Britain's best-selling author, surpassing J.K. Rowling by some 600,000 sales.

== Life and career ==
=== Childhood ===
Donaldson was born on 16 September 1948, and was brought up in Hampstead, London, with her younger sister. The family occupied a Victorian three-storey house near Hampstead Heath.

Both parents were musical. Poetry also featured strongly in Donaldson's early life; she was given The Book of a Thousand Poems by her father when she was five years old, and her grandmother introduced her to Edward Lear’s nonsense rhymes. Donaldson attended New End Primary School and then Camden School for Girls. During her childhood and adolescence, she acted (understudying the fairies in Shakespeare's A Midsummer Night's Dream at The Old Vic where she made the acquaintance of a young Judi Dench and Tom Courtenay), sang with the Children's Opera Group, and learned the piano.

A skilled linguist, she studied French and German at school and later acquired Italian through a summer tutoring job with a family in Naples, so that by the age of 19, she had a proficient grasp of all three languages.

=== University life ===
Donaldson studied Drama and French at Bristol University (1967–1970), graduating with a 2:1 honours degree. During her time there she acted in departmental productions and learned the guitar. In 1968, she and her friend Maureen Purkis took part in the play I am not the Eiffel Tower with music composed by Colin Sell, a young pianist who was studying Spanish and Portuguese at Bristol and who later appeared in BBC Radio 4's I'm Sorry I Haven't a Clue.

Sell's roommate Malcolm Donaldson, a medical student, came to see the show and subsequently teamed up with Sell, Donaldson and Purkis to sing in the pubs during Bristol University Rag Week in early 1969. Almost immediately after this Donaldson and Purkis were seconded to live in Paris for six months as part of their degree course where they sang and played their guitars to café audiences for money. Malcolm joined them in the summer and the trio performed various songs by the Beatles and from musicals including Hair.

=== 1970s ===
The couple continued to busk in Europe during holidays, including in France and Italy, with Julia Donaldson writing "The French Busking Song" in French, and "The Spaghetti Song" in Italian. By 1971, Donaldson was working in London at Michael Joseph publishers as a secretary to Anthea Joseph but was also given considerable leeway as a junior editor. At weekends she and Malcolm took part in the Bristol Street Theatre, a group of mainly postgraduate students inspired by the late playwright David Illingworth. The group devised simple, unscripted plays which could be performed in the playgrounds of poor council estates and which recruited children from the audience to take over some of the roles. This was to have a lasting effect on Donaldson's interaction with children in her own shows as an established children's writer.

The couple were married on 30 September 1972 at St John-at-Hampstead Church, Donaldson composing an operetta which she and Malcolm, their best man Colin Sell, the bridesmaids and ushers performed at the reception in Burgh House, Hampstead. A picture of the wedding is on display in the house today. Donaldson then worked as a secretary in Radio Bristol where she also had a weekly slot as short story producer/editor. In August 1974 the couple moved to Brighton where Donaldson had been appointed as editor at Robert Tyndall, a small book publishers. Shortly before this she had sent a tape of songs to BBC Children's Television, and between 1974 and 1978 she wrote regularly for the programme Play Away, her songs being performed by actors and musicians including Toni Arthur, Floella Benjamin, Johnny Ball, Brian Cant, Derek Griffiths and musical director Jonathan Cohen. She also wrote occasional songs for Play School and for the Watch with Mother programme Play Board. Some of Donaldson's songs – "The Luck of the Game", "Funny Face" and "A Squash and a Squeeze" – were recorded at this time for BBC albums.

Julia and Malcolm were involved in the Brighton folk club scene, performing floor spots of comedy songs written by Donaldson, often within days of being composed. The songs were variously influenced by Flanders and Swann, topical affairs and traditional folk tales (the latter inspiring spoofs such as "The Ballad of Jack Nancy and Fred", and "Folk Alphabet"). Their vinyl album First Fourteen (1977) featured many of these songs, while others were included much later on the CD Second Fourteen (2006, when First Fourteen was also re-mastered as a CD).

Donaldson composed two musicals for children: King Grunt's Cake (1976) and Pirate on the Pier (1980) which she and a small cast performed both in London and Brighton. Influenced by their Bristol Street Theatre experience, Donaldson ran a Saturday-morning workshop for children in Portslade from 1974 to 1976. During these sessions a simple play would be devised, followed by making of props and costumes, rehearsal and then a performance.

In 1977/6 Donaldson studied at Brighton College of Education for a Postgraduate Certificate in Education and worked for two years as an English teacher at St Mary's Hall in Brighton until the arrival of their first child Hamish in 1978, after which she never returned to full-time employment. The couple moved to Lyon in France for a year (1979–80) with Hamish, returning to Brighton where their second son Alastair was born in 1981.

=== 1980s ===
In 1983, the family of four moved to Bristol where Malcolm Donaldson was appointed as Senior Registrar in Paediatrics to United Bristol Hospitals. By then the television writing had dried up and the folk scene had waned. Julia Donaldson became a volunteer in Hamish's primary school. She devised short plays with the right number of parts for a reading group, rotating the roles until each child had read the whole play. The piece would then be performed to the entire class. In 1989, Malcolm was appointed to the University of Glasgow as senior lecturer in child health and the family, now five following the arrival of Jerry in 1987, moved to Bearsden.

=== 1990s ===
Once in Glasgow, Donaldson 'pitched' once again for song-writing commissions with the BBC. Between 1990 and 1994 she wrote for various programmes including Thinkabout Science (two series) and Playdays, composing songs for presenters and puppets (such as Lizzie and the Whybird) to sing.

In 1991, Donaldson was contacted by Methuen Publishing to ask if the words of her song "A Squash and a Squeeze", which she had written for the BBC's Playboard programme in 1975, could be made into a picture book for children. The book was published in 1993, with illustrations by a German artist Axel Scheffler, who was living in London. Publication of A Squash and a Squeeze was a pivotal event for Donaldson. It made her realise that her song-writing talent could be applied to story-writing, and gave her the confidence to open her drawer of simple plays for schoolchildren and to send some samples to an educational publisher. Between 1993 and 1999 she wrote extensively for Heinemann and Ginn, including plays such as Birthday Surprise for younger classes and Top of the Mops for reluctant teenage readers, as well as re-tellings of traditional tales. During this time Donaldson started visiting Scottish schools and libraries, occasionally accompanied by Malcolm Donaldson and his guitar.

From the 1990s when Donaldson was extensively visiting school and libraries, she extended techniques learned in Bristol and Brighton to encourage children to act and sing with her. Following the publication of The Gruffalo she was invited to book festivals, participating in the Edinburgh International Book Festival every year from 1999 onwards, and appearing regularly at Hay, Cheltenham and Bath festivals, as well as at many theatres.

In 1995, while looking for ideas for an educational series of plays based on traditional tales, Donaldson came across a version of a Chinese story about a little girl who escapes being eaten by a tiger by claiming to be the fearsome Queen of the Jungle and inviting him to walk behind her. The tiger misinterprets the terror of the various animals they meet as being related to her rather than him, and flees. Donaldson sensed that this story could be developed into more than an educational item and returned to it later as a possible basis for a picture book. She decided to make the girl a mouse, and chose a fox, owl and snake as woodland rather than jungle creatures but wasn't satisfied with lines like "They ought to know, they really should / There aren't any tigers in this wood".

She then thought of the idea of a monster whose name would end in O (to rhyme with "doesn't he know"). "Gr" sounded suitably fierce as the start to the monster's name, and filling in the middle with "uffal" gave the name Gruffalo, conjuring up the pleasing image of a monster reminiscent of a buffalo but a lot more scary. Even then, The Gruffalo proved nigh impossible to write but, encouraged by her son Alastair, Donaldson persisted with her idea that the monster, rather than existing in the Deep Dark Wood from the outset, should be a figment of the Mouse's imagination, employed to scare off the fox, owl and snake but then turning out to be a reality. A further objection to the original draft was made by Jesse (by now called Jerry) who asked, "Mum, why don't the fox, owl and snake just eat the mouse on the spot?" This flaw was resolved by inserting the question "Where are you meeting him? (The Gruffalo)" and the reply "Here, by these rocks / And his favourite food is roasted fox", with similar lines for the remaining two predators.

The Gruffalo was sent to Reid Books in 1995. Donaldson sent the text to Axel Scheffler, whom she had met only once or twice, briefly, following the publication of A Squash and a Squeeze. Within days Macmillan Children's Books made an offer to publish The Gruffalo, which was illustrated by Scheffler and published in 1999.

== Post-Gruffalo era ==
The Gruffalo was an immediate success, going on to win several awards, including the Smarties Prize (1999). It has subsequently been translated into more than 50 languages, sold more than 10 million copies worldwide, and has given rise to stage and screen productions by Tall Stories and Magic Light Pictures. The Gruffalo was followed by more Donaldson/Scheffler publications by Macmillan: Monkey Puzzle (2000), Room on the Broom (2001), The Smartest Giant in Town (2002), The Snail and the Whale (2003), The Gruffalo's Child, featuring an only child Gruffalo with a wooden stick doll plus the original cast of Gruffalo, Mouse, Fox, Snake and Owl (2004), and Charlie Cook's Favourite Book (2005). In 2006 Scheffler moved to Alison Green Books who published the duo's Tiddler (2007), Stick Man (2008), Tabby McTat (2009), Zog (2010), The Highway Rat (2011), Superworm (2012), The Scarecrows' Wedding (2014), Zog and the Flying Doctors (2017) and The Smeds and the Smoos (2019). In February 2026, Donaldson announced a third Gruffalo book titled Gruffalo Granny, set for a September 2026 release.

Since publication of The Gruffalo, Donaldson has worked with other illustrators including Lydia Monks, David Roberts and Nick Sharratt, who has also illustrated two books of poems by Donaldson, Crazy Mayonnaisy Mum and Wriggle and Roar. Lydia Monks has illustrated the Princess Mirror-Belle trilogy, a series of books for 7- to 10-year-olds about a boastful girl who is the mirror reflection of an ordinary girl called Ellen. The inspiration for Mirror-Belle was Hamish's imaginary childhood friend Sammy, who lived behind a wardrobe mirror.

Donaldson is also the author of The Giants and the Joneses for children aged 8–12 years. Her teenage novel Running on the Cracks is set in Glasgow and traces the adventures of orphaned half-Chinese Leo (aged 15) who is fleeing from her dodgy uncle in England and trying to find her father's estranged family. She befriends a schoolboy called Finlay, who is loosely based on Donaldson's youngest son Jerry during his days as a paper boy. Running on the Cracks, whose element of mental illness is drawn from Hamish's hospital experiences won the Nasen award in 2011 for its sympathetic and inclusive portrait of Mary, who befriends Leo but then descends into a severe relapse of her bi-polar condition.

Donaldson has also written a phonic reading scheme of short stories comprising 60 books of Songbird Phonics, published by Oxford University Press.

A typical public event consists of acting out (more or less word-for-word) four stories, and singing three or four songs (mostly from Donaldson's three albums of songs – The Gruffalo Song and Other Songs, Room on the Broom and Other Songs and The Gruffalo's Child and Other Songs). There is always a strong element of audience participation, with children (and sometimes their parents) invited on stage to act parts in the stories. Malcolm Donaldson almost always takes part in the events, and they are also often joined by other performers including family members.

Donaldson has also performed jointly with her illustrators, particularly Axel Scheffler and Lydia Monks. She has performed the Donaldson/Scheffler books not only in English but also in German on several tours and at the Berlin International Literature Festival. In 2007, when Malcolm took a sabbatical from his job, he joined Julia on a World Tour, acting and singing in Bermuda, New Zealand, Australia, Hong Kong, Singapore, Korea and America.

=== Laureateship ===
In 2011, Donaldson was appointed Children's Laureate succeeding the illustrator Anthony Browne. In keeping with her interest in acting and singing Donaldson has set out to encourage children to perform poetry, plays and dramatised readings to generate a love of books and of reading. Accordingly, she has created a series of Plays to Read for six characters to be performed in the classroom, written by herself and by other writers such as Geraldine McCaughrean, Jeanne Willis and Vivian French. The first 36 of these plays, for early readers, were published by Pearson (2013) with a further 24 plays for older primary-school children following later in the year. She also compiled an anthology of Poems to Perform by groups of children.

In her laureate role Donaldson has campaigned against library cuts and closures, writing articles, meeting ministers and – with Malcolm Donaldson – embarking on a six-week tour of UK libraries in autumn 2012. In all of the 38 libraries the visiting children were requested to perform a short play or song based on a picture book, as well as joining in Donaldson's own stories and songs. The tour was designed to celebrate libraries as a precious resource at a time many were threatened with closure.

== Personal life ==
In her 30s, Donaldson was diagnosed with "cookie-bite" hearing loss, which leaves a bite-shaped hole in the mid-range of the audible spectrum, making it difficult for her to hear some speech and music, and she is helped by lip reading.

Malcolm Donaldson, Julia's husband, was a consultant paediatrician. The couple previously resided in Bearsden, East Dunbartonshire and, in 2014, moved to Steyning, West Sussex. They have three sons, the eldest of whom, Hamish, had Schizoaffective disorder and died by suicide in 2003 at the age of 25. His death followed that of his cousin Gaius (the son of Julia's sister, Mary Moore), who also suffered from mental health issues and died by suicide 29 days earlier, on 1 November 2003. Donaldson credited Hamish with inspiring some of her imaginative writings. Malcolm died from cancer on 22 September 2024, at the age of 75.

Her great-niece is British singer Lola Young, who is the daughter of Mary's daughter Imogen.

== Charity work ==
Donaldson is a patron of ArtLink Central, a charity which places artists in disadvantaged communities, and of Bookbug, a programme run by the Scottish Book Trust and funded by the Scottish Government, which gifts more than 500,000 books to children aged 0–5 in Scotland every year, encouraging parents to share books with their children from birth. In addition she is a patron of Storybook Dads, a UK charity which helps serving prisoners to send recordings of themselves reading bedtime stories to their children in order to maintain connections with some of the 200,000 children affected by parental imprisonment. She is also patron of Monmouth's Savoy Cinema.

In September 2026, the Herald reported that 30,000 copies of the Gruffalo and its spin-off titles will be given free to children through Scottish Book Trust.

== Awards, honours and prize ==
She was appointed Member of the Most Excellent Order of the British Empire (MBE) in the 2011 Birthday Honours for services to literature. She was promoted to Commander of the Most Excellent Order of the British Empire (CBE) in the 2019 New Year Honours. She was elected a Fellow of the Royal Society of Literature in 2018.

She was awarded honorary doctorates by the University of Bristol in 2011 and the University of Glasgow in 2012.

- 1999 Nestle Smarties Book Prize (Gold Award): The Gruffalo
- 2000 Blue Peter Best Book to Read Aloud: The Gruffalo
- 2001 Experian Big Three Award: The Gruffalo
- 2002 Spoken Book Awards, Children's Audio of the Year: The Gruffalo
- 2002 Sheffield Book Award: Room on the Broom
- 2002 Scottish Children's Book Award: Room on the Broom
- 2002 Stockport Book Award: Room on the Broom
- 2003 Norfolk Libraries Book Award: Room on the Broom
- 2003 Blue Peter Best Book to Read Aloud: Room on the Broom
- 2003 Spoken Book Awards Gold Prize for 6 and under: Room on the Broom
- 2003 Spoken Book Awards Silver Prize for 6 and under: Monkey Puzzle
- 2003 Red House Children's Book Award: The Smartest Giant in Town
- 2003 Sheffield Children's Book Award: The Smartest Giant in Town
- 2004 Portsmouth Book Awards: The Smartest Giant in Town
- 2004 Blue Peter Best Book to Read Aloud: The Smartest Giant in Town
- 2004 Spoken Book Awards Gold Prize for 6 and Under: The Smartest Giant in Town
- 2004 Book Trust Early Years Award: The Snail and the Whale
- 2005 Nottingham Book Award: The Smartest Giant in Town
- 2005 Blue Peter Best Book to Read Aloud: The Snail and the Whale
- 2005 Spoken Book Awards Gold Prize for 6 and Under Audio: The Snail and the Whale
- 2005 British Book Awards: The Gruffalo's Child
- 2007 Giverny Award: The Snail and the Whale
- 2009 NASEN Book Awards: Running on the Cracks
- 2010 Galaxy Book Award: Zog
- 2011 Stockport Book Award: What the Ladybird Heard
- 2011 Scottish Children's Book Awards: What the Ladybird Heard
- 2011 Stockport Book Awards: The Troll
- 2011 Oxfordshire Book Awards: Zog
- 2012 Stockport Book Awards: Jack and the Flumflum Tree
- 2012 Oldham Book Awards: Jack and the Flumflum Tree

== Works ==
Year	Title	ISBN	Illustrator	Notes
1993	A Squash and a Squeeze	ISBN 1-4050-0477-0	Axel Scheffler	
1998	Books and Crooks (Play)	ISBN 978-0-7487-3656-0		
1999	The Gruffalo	ISBN 0-333-71093-2	Axel Scheffler	
2000	Monkey Puzzle	ISBN 0-333-72001-6	Axel Scheffler	
2000	Hide-and-Seek Pig (Tales from Acorn Wood)	ISBN 978-0-333-96625-9	Axel Scheffler	
2000	Postman Bear (Tales from Acorn Wood)	ISBN 978-0-333-96624-2	Axel Scheffler	
2000	Fox's Socks (Tales from Acorn Wood)	ISBN 978-0-333-96623-5	Axel Scheffler	
2000	Rabbit's Nap (Tales from Acorn Wood)	ISBN 978-1-4052-1788-0	Axel Scheffler	
2002	Room on the Broom	ISBN 0-333-90338-2	Axel Scheffler	
2002	The Smartest Giant in Town	ISBN 0-333-96396-2	Axel Scheffler	
2002	Night Monkey, Day Monkey	ISBN 978-0-7497-4893-7	Lucy Richards	
2003	The Snail and the Whale	ISBN 0-333-98224-X	Axel Scheffler	
2003	The Dinosaur's Diary	ISBN 0-14-131382-X		
2004	One Ted Falls Out of Bed	ISBN 0-333-94782-7	Anna Currey	
2004	The Gruffalo's Child	ISBN 1-4050-2045-8	Axel Scheffler	
2004	The Giants and the Joneses	ISBN 0-8050-7805-3	Greg Swearingen	
2004	The Magic Paintbrush	ISBN 978-0-333-96443-9	Joel Stewart	
2004	The Wrong Kind of Bark	ISBN 1-4052-1062-1	Garry Parsons	
2004	Brick-a-Breck	ISBN 0-7136-6441-X	Philippe Dupasquier	
2004	Bombs and Blackberries	ISBN 0-7502-4125-X	Thomas Docherty	
2004	The Head in the Sand: A Roman Play	ISBN 0-7502-4127-6	Ross Collins	
2005	Chocolate Mousse for Greedy Goose	ISBN 1-4050-2190-X	Nick Sharratt	
2005	Charlie Cook's Favourite Book	ISBN 978-1-4050-3469-2	Axel Scheffler	
2005	The Gruffalo Song and Other Songs	ISBN 1-4050-2234-5	Axel Scheffler	
2005	The Quick Brown Fox Club	ISBN 1-4052-1268-3	Lucy Richards	
2005	Sharing a Shell	ISBN 978-1-4050-2048-0	Lydia Monks	
2005	Spinderella	ISBN 978-1-4052-8272-7	Sebastien Braun	
2005	Wriggle and Roar	ISBN 1-4050-2166-7	Nick Sharratt	
2005	Crazy Mayonnaisy Mum	ISBN 0-330-41490-9	Nick Sharratt	
2005	Princess Mirror-Belle	ISBN 0-330-41530-1	Lydia Monks	
2005	Princess Mirror-Belle and the Magic Shoes	ISBN 1-4050-4867-0	Lydia Monks	
2005	Princess Mirror-Belle and the Flying Horse	ISBN 0-330-43795-X	Lydia Monks	
2006	The Princess and the Wizard	ISBN 978-1-4050-5313-6	Lydia Monks	
2006	Room on the Broom and Other Songs	ISBN 978-1-4050-9101-5	Axel Scheffler	
2006	Rosie's Hat	ISBN 978-1-4050-0007-9	Anna Currey	
2006	Hippo Has a Hat	ISBN 978-1-4050-2192-0	Nick Sharratt	
2006	Play Time! A Selection of Plays	ISBN 0-330-44595-2		
2007	Follow the Swallow	ISBN 978-1-4052-1788-0	Martin Ursell	
2007	Tiddler	ISBN 978-0-439-94377-2	Axel Scheffler	
2007	Tyrannosaurus Drip	ISBN 978-1-4050-9000-1	David Roberts	
2008	One Mole Digging a Hole	ISBN 978-0-2307-0647-7	Nick Sharratt	
2008	Stick Man	ISBN 978-1-4071-0882-7	Axel Scheffler	
2009	Toddle Waddle	ISBN 978-0-230-70648-4	Nick Sharratt	
2009	What the Ladybird Heard	ISBN 978-0-2307-0650-7	Lydia Monks	
2009	Tabby McTat	ISBN 978-1-4071-0924-4	Axel Scheffler	
2009	The Troll	ISBN 978-0-230-01793-1	David Roberts	
2009	Running on the Cracks	ISBN 978-1-4052-2233-4		Donaldson's first novel for teenagers
2010	Cave Baby	ISBN 978-0-3305-2276-2	Emily Gravett	
2010	Zog	ISBN 978-1-4071-1556-6	Axel Scheffler	
2011	Freddie and the Fairy	ISBN 978-0-3305-1118-6	Karen George	
2011	The Rhyming Rabbit	ISBN 978-0-2307-4103-4	Lydia Monks	
2011	The Highway Rat	ISBN 978-1-4071-2437-7	Axel Scheffler	
2011	The Gruffalo's Child and Other Songs	ISBN 978-0-2307-6173-5	Axel Scheffler	
2011	Jack and the Flumflum Tree	ISBN 978-0-230-71023-8	David Roberts	
2012	Goat Goes to Playgroup	ISBN 978-1-4472-5484-3	Nick Sharratt	
2012	The Singing Mermaid	ISBN 978-0-230-75044-9	Lydia Monks	
2012	Superworm	ISBN 978-1-4071-3204-4	Axel Scheffler	
2012	The Paper Dolls	ISBN 978-0-2307-4108-9	Rebecca Cobb	
2012	The Snake Who Came to Stay	ISBN 978-1-7811-2008-8	Hannah Shaw	
2012	Mr Birdsnest and the House Next Door	ISBN 978-1-7811-2005-7	Hannah Shaw	
2013	Sugarlump and the Unicorn	ISBN 978-1-4472-4019-8	Lydia Monks	
2013	The Further Adventures of the Owl and the Pussy-cat	ISBN 978-0-1413-3288-8	Charlotte Voake	
2014	The Flying Bath	ISBN 978-0-2307-4260-4	David Roberts	
2014	The Scarecrows' Wedding	ISBN 978-1-4071-4441-2	Axel Scheffler	
2015	What the Ladybird Heard Next	ISBN 978-1-4472-7595-4	Lydia Monks	
2016	The Detective Dog	ISBN 978-1-5098-0159-6	Sara Ogilvie	
2016	Princess Mirror-Belle and Prince Precious Paws	ISBN 978-1-4472-8564-9	Lydia Monks	
2017	Zog and the Flying Doctors	ISBN 978-1-4071-7350-4	Axel Scheffler	
2017	The Everywhere Bear	ISBN 978-1-4472-8073-6	Rebecca Cobb	
2017	The Ugly Five	ISBN 978-1-4071-7419-8	Axel Scheffler	
2018	Animalphabet	ISBN 978-0-525-55415-8	Sharon King-Chai	
2018	What the Ladybird Heard on Holiday	ISBN 978-1-5098-3733-5	Lydia Monks	
2018	The Cook and the King	ISBN 978-1-5098-1377-3	David Roberts	
2019	The Smeds and the Smoos	ISBN 978-1-4071-8889-8	Axel Scheffler	
2020	The Hospital Dog	ISBN 978-1-5098-6831-5	Sara Ogilvie	
2021	Cat's Cookbook (Tales from Acorn Wood)	ISBN 978-1-5290-3436-3	Axel Scheffler	
2021	Squirrel's Snowman (Tales from Acorn Wood)	ISBN 978-1-5290-3437-0	Axel Scheffler	
2022	The Baddies	ISBN 978-0-7023-0351-7	Axel Scheffler	
2022	Badger's Band (Tales from Acorn Wood)	ISBN 978-1-5290-3439-4	Axel Scheffler	
2022	Mole's Spectacles (Tales from Acorn Wood)	ISBN 978-1-5290-3438-7	Axel Scheffler	
2023	The Oak Tree	ISBN 978-0-7023-2435-2	Victoria Sandøy	
2023	Dormouse Has a Cold (Tales from Acorn Wood)	ISBN 978-1-0350-0690-8	Axel Scheffler	
2023	Julia Donaldson's Book of Names	ISBN 978-1-5290-7643-1	Nila Aye	
2024	Frog's Day Out (Tales from Acorn Wood)	ISBN 978-1-0350-0688-5	Axel Scheffler	
2024	Jonty Gentoo - The Adventures of a Penguin	ISBN 978-0-7023-2943-2	Axel Scheffler	
2025	Hare's New Dress (Tales from Acorn Wood)	ISBN 978-1-0350-4496-2	Axel Scheffler	
2026	Gruffalo Granny	ISBN 978-1-0350-6551-6	Axel Scheffler	

Cultural offices
Preceded by Anthony Browne	Children's Laureate of the United Kingdom; 2011–2013	Succeeded by Malorie Blackman
