= Room on the Broom =

Children's book by Julia Donaldson

First edition cover

Room on the Broom is a British children's story book by writer and playwright Julia Donaldson and illustrated by Axel Scheffler, which tells the story of a kind witch and her cat who invite three other animals (a dog, a bird and a frog) to join them travelling on her broomstick.

Room on the Broom has been translated into 22 languages and has won six book awards (Scottish, Sheffield, Stockport, Norfolk, Blue Peter and Mumsnet).

It was first published by Macmillan in 2001 (ISBN 9780803726574) and since been made into an animated film, narrated by Simon Pegg and starring the voices of Martin Clunes, Rob Brydon, Sally Hawkins, David Walliams, Gillian Anderson and Timothy Spall. The animated film was nominated for an Academy Award for best short animated film in 2013.

The book was also made into an audiobook narrated by Josie Lawrence and adapted for the stage by Tall Stories Theatre Company in 2008, and has toured around the United Kingdom and the rest of the world since then.

In 2019 a walk-through attraction themed to the book opened at Chessington World of Adventures.
