= Axel Scheffler =

German illustrator and animator (born 1957)

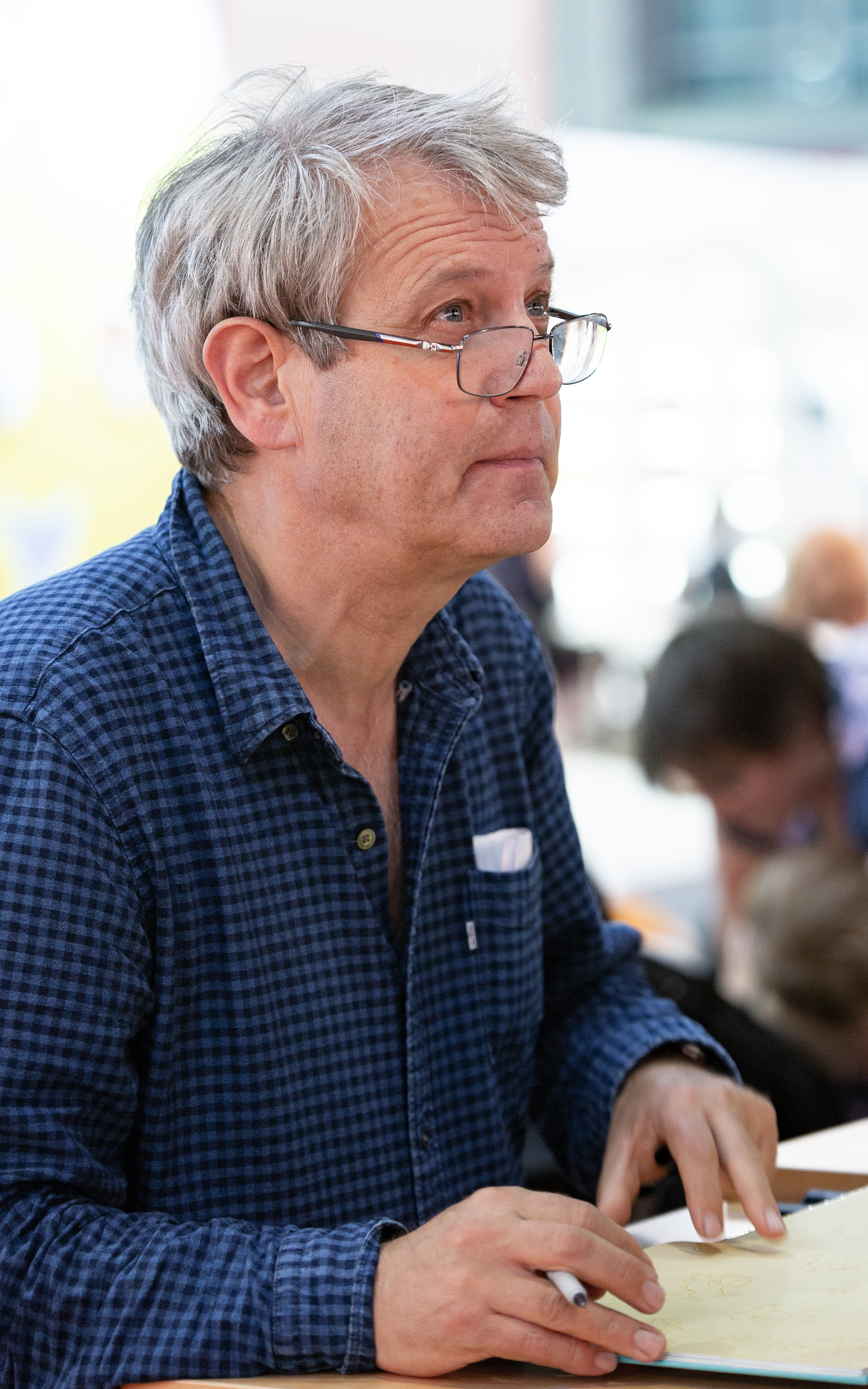
- Scheffler at the 2018 Frankfurt Book Fair
- Born: 12 December 1957 (age 68); Hamburg, West Germany
- Education: Bath Academy of Art
- Occupations: Illustrator, animator
- Children: 1
- Writing career
- Notable works: The Gruffalo; Room on the Broom; Stick Man; Zog; Superworm
- Website: axelscheffler.com

Axel Scheffler (born 12 December 1957) is a German illustrator and animator based in London. He is best known for his cartoon-like pictures for children's books, in particular The Gruffalo and The Gruffalo's Child, written by Julia Donaldson. He has also illustrated the Pip and Posy series of books for children.

== Early life ==
Scheffler was born on 12 December 1957 in Hamburg, West Germany. He began studying the History of Art at the University of Hamburg but dropped out, deciding instead to work in alternative National Service, caring for the mentally ill. He moved to England in 1982, at the age of 25, to study visual communications at the Bath Academy of Art in Corsham, Wiltshire. The course also included being an international exchange student at Cooper Union in New York City. During these years (1982–1984) Scheffler decided to become an illustrator.

== Career ==
Scheffler worked in advertising and publishing after graduating in 1985. During this time he lived at Streatham Hill in London and began illustrating children's books. The first book he illustrated was The Piemakers by Helen Cresswell, in 1988. Since then he has contributed his distinctive illustrations for authors of children's books from Britain, Germany, and the Netherlands, including Julia Donaldson, Jon Blake, Paul Shipton, David Henry Wilson, Uwe Timm, Paul van Loon, and Toon Tellegen.

Scheffler was commissioned by Faber and Faber to provide new illustrations for an edition of Old Possum's Book of Practical Cats which commemorated the 70th anniversary of the book and the 80th anniversary of the company. The original was published in October 2009.

He illustrated Gordon Brown's 2006 Christmas cards and all seven Christmas 2012 stamps designed by Webb & Webb Design Limited for Royal Mail.

== Personal life ==
Scheffler lives in Richmond, London with his partner and daughter.
