= Colourblocks =

British television series

- Genre: Educational; Preschool
- Created by: Joe Elliot; David Bowman
- Written by: Ian Carney
- Directed by: Francesca Adams (series director); Dan Cripps (animation director)
- Voices of: Will Jennings; Claire Morgan; Bayo Gbadamosi; Harriet Carmichael; Yeukayi Ushe; Akiya Henry; Stephanie McKeon; Dominique Moore; Beth Chalmers; David Holt; Joanna Ruiz; Colin McFarlame; Corrina Brown; Penelope Rawlins
- Composer: Ben Lee-Delisle
- Country of origin: United Kingdom
- Original language: English
- No. of series: 3
- No. of episodes: 55 (+5 upcoming)

Production
- Production companies: Blue Zoo; Alphablocks Ltd

Original release
- Network: CBeebies
- Release: 12 September 2022 – present

Related
- Alphablocks; Numberblocks; Wonderblocks

Colourblocks is a British animated television series for preschoolers that debuted on CBeebies on 12 September 2022. The series follows the adventures of the main character Colourblock Yellow and his friends in Colourland, each one named after a colour. Together with the series Alphablocks and Numberblocks it is a part of the "Blocks Universe". Commissioned by the British Broadcasting Corporation, the programme was created by Joe Elliot and David Bowman, and produced by Alphablocks Ltd. with Blue Zoo Animation Studio.

So far, three seasons have been produced. As of 2024, the series is scheduled for production up to 2027, per an agreement between the Alphablocks Ltd. and Blue Zoo, and the BBC.

== Premise ==
The programme aims to teach children about colours. Colour mixing is represented by characters bumping into each other to produce a new character of the resulting colour. A particular object representative of its colour is associated with each character. While being themed on colours, characters also have different shapes so that colour blind children would be able to distinguish between them.

== Cast ==
- Will Jennings (as Yellow, Purple, and Magenta)
- Claire Morgan (as Red and Orange)
- Bayo Gbadamosi (as Blue)
- Harriet Carmichael (as Green, Indigo, Violet, Black, White, Brown, Grey, Light Grey, and Dark Grey)
- Yeukayi Ushe (as Pink)
- Akiya Henry (as Cyan)
- Stephanie McKeon (as Pale Yellow)
- Dominique Moore (as Lime)
- Beth Chalmers (as Deep Blue)
- David Holt (as Sky Blue)
- Joanna Ruiz (as Dark Red)
- Colin McFarlane (as Dark Yellow)
- Corrina Brown (as Gold)
- Penelope Rawlins (as Silver)

== Episodes ==
=== Series 1 (2022–2023) ===
No. in series	Title	Original release date
1	"Red"	12 September 2022
The colour red
2	"Blue"	13 September 2022
The colour blue
3	"Yellow"	14 September 2022
The colour yellow
4	"Red Meets Blue"	15 September 2022
Multicoloured things
5	"Yellow Meets Red and Blue"	16 September 2022
Primary colours
6	"Green"	19 September 2022
The colour green
7	"Green Means Go"	20 September 2022
Blue and yellow mixing to make green
8	"Chameleon"	21 September 2022
Introduction to colour changing
9	"Silly Colouring"	22 September 2022
Things in right or wrong colours
10	"Orange"	23 September 2022
The colour orange
11	"Red and Yellow Meet Orange"	26 September 2022
Red and yellow mixing to make orange
12	"Purple"	27 September 2022
The colour purple
13	"The Uncoloured Castle"	28 September 2022
Red and blue mixing to make purple
14	"Purple's Patterns"	29 September 2022
Types of patterns
15	"Rainbow"	30 September 2022
Rainbow; the colours indigo and violet
16	"Little Red Riding Hood"	23 January 2023
Recap of making orange
17	"Pick a Partner"	24 January 2023
Analogous and complementary colours
18	"Black and White"	25 January 2023
The colours black and white
19	"Shades of the Forest"	26 January 2023
Introduction to dark and light colors by mixing different colours with black and white respectively
20	"Lighter and Darker"	27 January 2023
Bright, light, and dark colours
21	"Pink"	30 January 2023
The colour pink
22	"Brown"	31 January 2023
The colour brown
23	"Many Mixes Make Brown"	1 February 2023
Many shades of brown; three colors mixing together
24	"The Printing Crew"	2 February 2023
Colours cyan and magenta
25	"Grey"	3 February 2023
The colour grey and its shades
26	"Return of the Printing Crew"	6 February 2023
The CMYK colour model
27	"The Sorting Express"	7 February 2023
Sorting things by colour
28	"Choosing Colours"	8 February 2023
Colour contrast
29	"Colour Wheels"	9 February 2023
4, 6, and 8 colour wheels
30	"It's a Colourful World"	10 February 2023
Recap

=== Series 2 (2023–2024) ===
No. in series	Title	Original release date
1	"It's a Colourful Christmas"	4 December 2023
2	"The Mixing Factory"	12 February 2024
Mixing and shading colours
3	"A Plate Of Many Colours"	13 February 2024
Food in many colours
4	"Name That Colour"	14 February 2024
Identifying colours and their mixes and shades
5	"Colouring a Rainbow"	15 February 2024
The colours of the rainbow
6	"Printing Crew to the Rescue"	16 February 2024
Black as a member of the Printing Crew
7	"Deep Blue and Sky Blue"	19 February 2024
Blue and its shades; the colour deep blue and sky blue
8	"Orange's Gym"	20 February 2024
Orange and its shades
9	"Purple's Mural Makeover"	21 February 2024
Purple and its shades
10	"Lime"	22 February 2024
The colour lime
11	"Return of the Sorting Express"	23 February 2024
12	"Fun with Colours"	26 February 2024
13	"It's a Grey Day"	27 February 2024
Mixing different colours with grey
14	"Red's Recolouring Tour"	28 February 2024
Red and its shades
15	"A Colourful Journey"	29 February 2024

=== Series 3 (2026) ===
Currently, 10/15 Series 3 episodes are released and available to stream on BBC iPlayer.

No. in series	Title	Original release date
1	"Guess the Colour"	9 November 2026
2	"Dark Red's Show"	10 November 2026
3	"Yellow Dance Party"	11 November 2026
4	"Natural Art"	12 November 2026
5	"Colours of the Seasons"	13 November 2026
6	"Meet Gold and Silver"	16 November 2026
7	"Apples and Easels"	17 November 2026
8	"Hide and Sparkle"	18 November 2026
9	"Colour Group Concert"	19 November 2026
10	"Dark Red's Poster Problem"	20 November 2026
11	"The Mixed-Up Picture Machine"	23 November 2026
12	"Space Craft"	24 November 2026
13	"Doorways to Art"	25 November 2026
14	"Prop Art"	26 November 2026
15	"Everyone's an Artist"	27 November 2026
