= Douglas Walker =

Douglas Walker may refer to:

== People ==
- Doug Walker (curler), American curler
- Doug Walker (musician), English, Manchester-based singer-songwriter
- Doug Walker (comedian) (born 1981), showrunner and star of the American review comedy web series Nostalgia Critic
- Douglas Walker (artist) (born 1958), Canadian painter
- Douglas Walker (sprinter) (born 1973), former Scottish sprinter
- Peahead Walker (Douglas Clyde Walker; 1899–1970), American football and baseball player
- Douglas K. Walker (born 1955), American astronomer and engineer after whom asteroid 128795 Douglaswalker is named
- Doug Walker (politician) (born 1952), Kansas state senator

== Characters ==
- Doug Walker, fictional character from the 2010 British horror film 13Hrs
- Douglas Walker, fictional character from the 1945 American zombie comedy film Zombies on Broadway
