= Alphablocks =

Television series

- Genre: Educational; Preschool
- Created by: Joe Elliot
- Written by: Max Allen; Joe Elliot; Neil & Annabel Richards; Maurice Suckling
- Voices of: Teresa Gallagher; David Holt; Lizzie Waterworth
- Composer: Ben Lee-Delisle
- Country of origin: United Kingdom
- Original language: English
- No. of series: 6
- No. of episodes: 121 (+ 8 specials)

Production
- Executive producers: Rebecca Shallcross; Joe Elliot
- Producer: Sioned Wyn Roberts
- Running time: 3 minutes (series 1); 5 minutes (series 2-present); 10 minutes (specials); 20 minutes (first-time specials)
- Production companies: Magic Lantern (series 1); Alphablocks Ltd. (series 2-specials); Blue Zoo Animation Studio (uncredited, credited in specials)

Original release
- Network: CBeebies
- Release: 25 January 2010 – 30 May 2025

Related
- Numberblocks; Colourblocks; Wonderblocks

Alphablocks is a British animated television series for preschoolers that debuted on CBeebies on 25 January 2010. The programme was created by Joe Elliot and produced by Alphablocks Ltd. (Magic Lantern in series 1) with Blue Zoo and Ritzy Animation. It was commissioned by the BBC.

== Plot ==
The show follows the Alphablocks, characters made of blocks who represent each letter of the alphabet. They live in a fictional planet called Alphaland and embark on adventures relating to word concepts.

== List of episodes ==
Series	Episodes	Originally released	
Series	Episodes	First released	Last released
1	26	25 January 2010	19 February 2010
2	26	8 March 2011	30 March 2012
3	26	1 October 2012	23 January 2013
4	13	17 June 2013	2 July 2013
Word Magic	26	23 March 2020	
Specials	8	16 October 2021	14 February 2022
5	15	10 February 2025	28 February 2025
6	15	12 May 2025	30 May 2025

=== Series 1 (2010) ===
No. overall	No. in season	Title	Directed by	Written by	Original release date
1	1	"Alphablocks"	Blue Zoo (Animation)	Joe Elliot & Max Allen	January 25, 2010
2	2	"Bee"	Blue Zoo (Animation)	Joe Elliot; Max Allen (Lead Writer)	January 25, 2010
3	3	"Top"	Blue Zoo (Animation)	Neil Richards, Maurice Suckling	January 26, 2010
4	4	"Why"	Blue Zoo (Animation)	Max Allen (Lead Writer)	January 26, 2010
5	5	"Key"	Blue Zoo (Animation)	Max Allen (Lead Writer)	January 27, 2010
6	6	"Glow"	Blue Zoo (Animation)	Emma Collins	January 27, 2010
7	7	"Sing"	Blue Zoo (Animation)	Joe Elliot	January 28, 2010
8	8	"Band"	Blue Zoo (Animation)	Max Allen (Lead Writer)	January 28, 2010
9	9	"Party"	Blue Zoo (Animation)	Max Allen (Lead Writer)	January 29, 2010
10	10	"Cha Cha Cha"	Blue Zoo (Animation)	Neil Richards & Maurice Suckling	February 1, 2010
11	11	"Race"	Blue Zoo (Animation)	Joe Elliot	February 1, 2010
12	12	"Moon"	Blue Zoo (Animation)	Emma Collins	February 2, 2010
13	13	"Alphalympics"	Blue Zoo (Animation)	Max Allen (Lead Writer)	February 3, 2010
14	14	"Sail"	Blue Zoo (Animation)	Neil Richards & Maurice Suckling	February 4, 2010
15	15	"UFO"	Blue Zoo (Animation)	Max Allen (Lead Writer)	February 5, 2010
16	16	"Fox"	Blue Zoo (Animation)	Max Allen (Lead Writer)	February 5, 2010
17	17	"Surprise"	Blue Zoo (Animation)	Neil Richards & Maurice Suckling	February 8, 2010
18	18	"Bus"	Blue Zoo (Animation)	Neil Richards & Maurice Suckling	February 9, 2010
19	19	"Space"	Blue Zoo (Animation)	Neil Richards, Maurice Suckling	February 10, 2010
20	20	"Hide"	Blue Zoo (Animation)	Emma Collins	February 11, 2010
21	21	"Quiet"	Blue Zoo (Animation)	Max Allen (Lead Writer)	February 12, 2010
22	22	"Map"	Blue Zoo (Animation)	Max Allen (Lead Writer)	February 15, 2010
23	23	"Jaybird"	Blue Zoo (Animation)	Emma Collins	February 16, 2010
24	24	"Note"	Blue Zoo (Animation)	Emma Collins	February 17, 2010
25	25	"Zzzzz"	Blue Zoo (Animation)	Emma Collins	February 19, 2010
26	26	"Magic"	Blue Zoo (Animation)	Joe Elliot	February 19, 2010

=== Series 2 (2012) ===
No. overall	No. in season	Title	Directed by	Written by	Original release date
27	1	"Taps"	Helen Arntsen (General) & Lizzie Hicks (Animation)	Neil and Annabel Richards	February 27, 2012
28	2	"In"	Helen Arntsen (General) & Lizzie Hicks (Animation)	Max Allen	February 28, 2012
29	3	"Man"	Helen Arntsen (General) & Lizzie Hicks (Animation)	Emma Collins	February 29, 2012
30	4	"Din"	Helen Arntsen (General) & Lizzie Hicks (Animation)	Max Allen	March 1, 2012
31	5	"Dog"	Helen Arntsen (General) & Lizzie Hicks (Animation)	Emma Collins	March 2, 2012
32	6	"Cat"	Helen Arntsen (General) & Lizzie Hicks (Animation)	Emma Collins	March 2, 2012
33	7	"Pen"	Helen Arntsen (General) & Lizzie Hicks (Animation)	Max Allen	March 8, 2011
34	8	"Up"	Helen Arntsen (General) & Lizzie Hicks (Animation)	Joe Elliot	March 6, 2012
35	9	"Red"	Helen Arntsen (General) & Lizzie Hicks (Animation)	Neil and Annabel Richards	March 7, 2012
36	10	"Hen"	Helen Arntsen (General) & Lizzie Hicks (Animation)	Emma Collins	March 8, 2012
37	11	"Bop"	Helen Arntsen (General) & Lizzie Hicks (Animation)	Neil and Annabel Richards	March 9, 2012
38	12	"Fred"	Helen Arntsen (General) & Lizzie Hicks (Animation)	Max Allen	March 12, 2012
39	13	"Hill"	Helen Arntsen (General) & Lizzie Hicks (Animation)	Neil and Annabel Richards	March 13, 2012
40	14	"Van"	Helen Arntsen (General) & Lizzie Hicks (Animation)	Emma Collins	March 14, 2012
41	15	"Zap"	Helen Arntsen (General) & Lizzie Hicks (Animation)	Emma Collins	March 15, 2012
42	16	"Dot"	Helen Arntsen (General) & Lizzie Hicks (Animation)	Emma Collins	March 16, 2012
43	17	"Surprise"	Helen Arntsen (General) & Lizzie Hicks (Animation)	Neil and Annabel Richards	March 19, 2012
44	18	"Web"	Helen Arntsen (General) & Lizzie Hicks (Animation)	Max Allen	March 20, 2012
45	19	"Box"	Helen Arntsen (General) & Lizzie Hicks (Animation)	Max Allen	March 21, 2012
46	20	"Quick"	Helen Arntsen (General) & Lizzie Hicks (Animation)	Max Allen	March 22, 2012
47	21	"Kick"	Helen Arntsen (General) & Lizzie Hicks (Animation)	Joe Elliot	March 23, 2012
48	22	"Wig"	Helen Arntsen (General) & Lizzie Hicks (Animation)	Sioned Wyn Roberts	March 26, 2012
49	23	"Rainbow"	Helen Arntsen (General) & Lizzie Hicks (Animation)	Neil & Annabel Richards	March 27, 2012
50	24	"On"	Helen Arntsen (General) & Lizzie Hicks (Animation)	Emma Collins	March 28, 2012
51	25	"ABC"	Helen Arntsen (General) & Lizzie Hicks (Animation)	Max Allen	March 29, 2012
52	26	"The Cat Sat On The Mat"	Helen Arntsen (General) & Lizzie Hicks (Animation)	Joe Elliot	March 30, 2012

=== Series 3 (2012–13) ===
1. Wish (UG word family)
2. Snowman (AN word family)
3. Win (IN word family)
4. Hat (AP word family)
5. Little Red N
6. Dots
7. Frog on a Dog (short vowels I and O)
8. Best (letter blend ST)
9. Fit (IT word family)
10. Odd (short vowel O; nonsense words)
11. Champ (digraphs CH and SH)
12. Song (digraph NG)
13. Thing (digraph TH)
14. Train (digraph AI)
15. Beep (digraph EE)
16. Tightrope (trigraph IGH)
17. Toad (digraph OA)
18. Book (digraph OO)
19. Hey! (vowels A, I, O, and OO)
20. Card (digraph AR)
21. The End (digraphs OI, OR, and UR)
22. How now brown cow (digraph OW)
23. Fair (trigraphs AIR, EAR, and URE, and digraph ER)
24. Ants (introduction to letter blends)
25. Ink (INK word family)
26. Crash (short vowel A; onomatopoeic words)

=== Series 4 (2013) ===
1. Four (words with ending blends)
2. Clap (words with beginning blends)
3. Prank (words with beginning and ending blends)
4. Plusman (compound words)
5. Alphabet (digraphs WH and PH)
6. Name (long vowel A)
7. Sleep (long vowel E)
8. Mine (long vowel I)
9. Home (long vowel O)
10. Blue (long vowel U, and digraph EW)
11. Outlaw (words with AW and AU)
12. Birthday Girl (digraph IR)
13. Cowboy (digraphs OY and OU)

=== Specials (2021–22) ===
1. Band Together (making words with letters appearing in alphabetical order)
2. The Wonderful Wizard of Az (changing vowels in CVC words)
3. Boo! (vowels A, O, and OO)
4. Letters to Santa (Christmas vocabulary)
5. Making Friends
6. Crossover (the A1-Z26 cipher)
7. The Case of the Missing Blocks (word magic with 2 words)
8. The Blocks v Blocks Games (anagrams)

=== Series 5 (2025) ===
1. An Alphablocks Adventure
2. Pip
3. C Versus K
4. Castles
5. R's Really Rare Rose
6. An Apple a Day
7. Ned
8. Treasure
9. Pot
10. No Fun Without U
11. Cub
12. Around Alphaland in a Day
13. Farm
14. Names
15. Good Food

=== Series 6 (2025) ===
1. Party Party
2. Shop
3. Think
4. Wow
5. Snow
6. Stop
7. Bugs
8. Stamp
9. Star
10. Snail
11. Signs
12. Maze
13. Who Can Help?
14. P's Perfect Painting
15. I Am I!

== Alphablocks: Word Magic ==
Alphablocks: Word Magic is a spin-off of Alphablocks. It is a series of 26 short episodes published all at the same time on BBC iPlayer in 2020.

Each and every episode will begin with the letter doing something, with the narrator describing it. After that, three words will be spelled with that letter, and a little scene will play that has something to do with that word. After the words, the same Alphablock animation will play a second time. There are 26 episodes, one for each letter in the alphabet.

The episodes last for 1–3 minutes.
