= Wonderblocks =

British children's TV series

- Genre: Educational; Preschool
- Created by: Joe Elliott; David Bowman
- Voices of: Joanna Adeyinka-Buford; Emma Tracey; Hamish Wyllie; Bethan Mary-James; John Hasler; Kate Harbour; Ashna Rabheru; Niamh Webb; Lucy Montgomery; Grace Saif; Inel Tomlinson; St. Isaiah Jean
- Country of origin: United Kingdom
- Original language: English
- No. of seasons: 1
- No. of episodes: 30

Production
- Production companies: Blue Zoo; Blocks Universe Ltd

Original release
- Network: CBeebies
- Release: 20 January 2025 – present

Related
- Alphablocks; Numberblocks; Colourblocks

Wonderblocks is a British animated television series for preschoolers that debuted on CBeebies on 20 January 2025. The series follows the adventures of block characters in Wonderland, each one being part of a different group. Together with the series Alphablocks, Numberblocks and Colourblocks, it is a part of the "Blocks Universe". Commissioned by the British Broadcasting Corporation, the programme was created by Joe Elliot and David Bowman, and produced by Alphablocks Ltd. with Blue Zoo Animation Studio.

So far, 30 episodes have aired. As of the 2023 plan, the series is scheduled for production up to 2027, per an agreement between Alphablocks Ltd., Blue Zoo, and the BBC. According to the Blue-Zoo website, the show's pilot started being produced and was pitched in 2020 just before the lockdown, five years prior to its release and one year prior to Colourblocks starting production in 2021.

== Premise ==
The programme aims to teach children about coding, thinking skills and problem-solving. The main characters are two friends, Go and Stop, who help their animal friends in their everyday life.

Most of the time, the characters work with Do-Blocks, which are the functions in coding. Go and Stop hold hands with them to make a script: for example, Go, Hop, and Stop hold hands and they make the script "Go-Hop-Stop"! They also work with Again to make loops.

== Characters ==
=== Main ===
- Go (voiced by Joanna Adeyinka-Buford) is a green, circular Wonderblock with white borders. She also has dark green limbs and freckles. She is hyperactive, silly, and loves to make things go. She can get carried away sometimes. Go is best friends with Stop.
- Stop (voiced by Emma Tracey) is a red, octagonal Wonderblock with white borders whose shape resembles a stop sign. She also has dark red limbs and thick eyebrows. She is patient, considerate, and calm, and her catchphrase is "let's stop and think things through" when someone gets things a bit messy. Stop is best friends with Go.
- Again (voiced by Mark Goldthorp) is a yellow, triangular Wonderblock with white borders. He also has dark yellow limbs. He is energetic and up and loves to make things go again and again.

=== Do Blocks ===
- Hop (voiced by Hamish Wyllie)
- Moo (voiced by Hamish Wyllie)
- Cluck (voiced by John Hasler)
- Splat (voiced by Kate Harbour)
- Baa (voiced by Ashna Rabheru)
- Unicycle (voiced by Inel Tomlinson)

==== Breakfast Crew ====
- Put Down Bowl (voiced by Kate Harbour)
- Tip Cereal (voiced by Hamish Wyllie)
- Pour Milk (voiced by John Hasler)

==== Moving Crew ====
- Left (voiced by Kate Harbour)
- Right (voiced by Ashna Rabheru)
- Backwards (voiced by John Hasler)
- Forwards (voiced by Hamish Wyllie)

==== Rainy Day Crew ====
- Put On Socks (voiced by Hamish Wyllie)
- Put On Boots (voiced by Lucy Montgomery)
- Open Umbrella (voiced by Kate Harbour)

==== Splatting Crew ====
- Splat Red (voiced by John Hasler)
- Splat Yellow (voiced by Kate Harbour)
- Splat Blue (voiced by Kate Harbour)

==== Beach Crew ====
- Scoop Sand (voiced by John Hasler)
- Tip Bucket (voiced by Ashna Rabheru)
- Scoop Ice Cream (voiced by John Hasler)

==== Dancing Crew ====
- Cheer (voiced by John Hasler)
- Clap (voiced by Kate Harbour)
- Spin (voiced by Ashna Rabheru)
- Wiggle (voiced by Hamish Wyllie)

==== Grow Blocks ====
- Grow Leaf (voiced by Grace Saif)
- Grow Stem (voiced by John Hasler)
- Grow Flower (voiced by Inel Tomlinson)
- Split in Two (voiced by John Hasler)

==== Musical Crew ====
- Toot (voiced by Lucy Montgomery)
- Bang (voiced by Kate Harbour)
- Pluck (voiced by John Hasler)

==== Moving Crew ====
- Push (voiced by Lucy Montgomery)
- Pull (voiced by Lucy Montgomery)
- Slide (voiced by Kate Harbour)

=== Animals ===
- Little Frog (voiced by Grace Saif)
- Frog (voiced by Inel Tomlinson)
- Toad (voiced by St. Isaiah Jean) - Toad loves flowers, art, and murals.
- Froggy (voiced by Niamh Webb)
- Cow (voiced by Niamh Webb)
- Secret Agent Chicken (voiced by Lucy Montgomery)
- Little Bear (voiced by Grace Saif)
- Medium Bear (voiced by Inel Tomlinson)
- Big Bear (voiced by Bethan Mary-James)
- Sheep (voiced by Ashton Frank)
- Chickens
- Birds

=== Miscellaneous ===
- Arty (voiced by Ashton Frank) - He is a purple stamp-like creature who aspires to be an artist.
- Little Hoppers (voiced by Isaiah St Jean) - Three smaller purple stamp-like creatures who are Arty's children.

== Episodes ==
There is only one season of Wonderblocks, which was released from 20 January 2025 to 28 February of the same year.

=== Series 1 (2025) ===
No. overall	No. in series	Title	Directed by	Written by	Learning competency	Song(s)	Original release date
1	1	"Go"	Simon Taylor	Andrew Barnett Jones and Ciaran Murtagh	"Go" and "Stop" commands	Give It a Go	20 January 2025
A green circle named Go falls from the sky and lands in Wonderland, which begins a mess in the place, and then meets a red octagon named Stop behind.
2	2	"Stop"	Simon Taylor	Andrew Barnett Jones and Ciaran Murtagh	Patience; crafting solutions	Stop and Think It Through	21 January 2025
Stop helps Go to get her ball back, and then tells Go that sometimes you need to stop and find solutions.
3	3	"Hop"	Simon Taylor	Andrew Barnett Jones and Ciaran Murtagh	Basics of Coding	None	22 January 2025
Go and Stop help Little Frog hop with the help of Do Block Hop, and at the final try the little frog jumps to the tree just to catch some apples.
4	4	"Moo!"	Simon Taylor	Andrew Barnett Jones and Ciaran Murtagh	Directing on what to do and when	What Does a Cow Make?	23 January 2025
Go and Stop help Cow moo for the Lilypad Band's concert with the help of Do Block Moo, and the concert goes really good at the end.
5	5	"Cluck!"	Simon Taylor	Andrew Barnett Jones and Ciaran Murtagh	Passwords; using multiple do commands in one script	TBA	24 January 2025
Go and Stop help Secret Agent Chicken enter the gate to enter into the hen house with the help of Do Block Cluck, only to turn her bath off.
6	6	"Mooving Up"	Simon Taylor	Andrew Barnett Jones and Ciaran Murtagh	Introduction to sequencing	None	27 January 2025
Go, Stop, Moo and Cluck let Cow on Secret Agent Chicken's lift, whereas the former animal needs to reach to her hay.
7	7	"Splat!"	Unknown	Unknown	Coding patterns	None	28 January 2025
Go and Stop help Arty to splat on Toad's stepping stones, with the help of Do Blocks Splat and Hop.
8	8	"The Breakfast Bears"	Unknown	Tiernan Douieb	Deciding what should go first; prioritization	None	29 January 2025
Go, Stop, Put Down Bowl, Tip Cereal, and Pour Milk help the Three Bears make their breakfast in the correct order for a happy breakfast.
9	9	"Moo! Cluck! Baa!"	Unknown	Unknown	Sequencing; clarification	Make Your Sound!	30 January 2025
Go and Stop host a "Make a Sound" contest, where Cow, Secret Agent Chicken and Sheep will need to make animal sounds with the help of Moo, Cluck, and Baa.
10	10	"Dancefloor Delight"	Unknown	Unknown	More about sequencing; introduction to movements	None	31 January 2025
Go and Stop make Arty move in directions, with the help of Left, Right, Forwards and Backwards.
11	11	"Step by Stepping Stone"	Unknown	Unknown	TBA	TBA	3 February 2025
Go and Stop help Arty to hop on the stepping stones with the correct moves, thank god the Moving Crew exists.
12	12	"Rainy Day Bears"	Unknown	Unknown	TBA	None	4 February 2025
Go and Stop help the Three Bears to get ready for the rain, with the help of Open Umbrella, Put on Socks and Put on Boots.
13	13	"Tower of Flowers"	Unknown	Unknown	TBA	None	5 February 2025
Go and Stop need Arty's help to make a colourful pattern tower for Toad, with the help of Splat Red, Yellow and Blue.
14	14	"Building Sandcastles"	Unknown	Tiernan Douieb	TBA	None	6 February 2025
Go and Stop help the Three Bears build sandcastles at the beach, with the help of Scoop Sand and Tip Bucket.
15	15	"First Things First"	Unknown	Unknown	TBA	First Things First	7 February 2025
Go and Stop deal with situations while they're making a picnic.
16	16	"What Can We Do?"	Unknown	Unknown	TBA	None	10 February 2025
Go and Stop wonder: does Secret Agent Chicken still inside the projection room? Cow wants that S.A.C. would notice her, with the help of the Do Blocks.
17	17	"Woodland Wiggle"	Unknown	Unknown	TBA	None	11 February 2025
Cow wants to know how to dance to the "Woodland Wiggle". Go and Stop teach her.
18	18	"Magic Beans"	Unknown	Unknown	TBA	None	12 February 2025
The Growing Crew helps Go and Stop use the magic beans.
19	19	"Musical Bears"	Unknown	Unknown	TBA	None	13 February 2025
The Three Bears are replacing the Lily Pad Band, due to falling ill. They learn how to use their instruments, with the help of Toot, Pluck and Bang.
20	20	"Sounds Like A Plan"	Unknown	Tiernan Douieb	TBA	That Sounds Like a Plan!	14 February 2025
Go and Stop need to organise a huge birthday party for Cow. But they'll need to split some steps.
21	21	"Top Secret Holiday Hideout Plan"	Unknown	Unknown	TBA	None	17 February 2025
Go and Stop have a hideout plan from S.A.C. They'll need to reach in time.
22	22	"Someone's Been Eating My Porridge"	Unknown	Unknown	TBA	None	18 February 2025
Little Bear has a problem, someone has been eating his porridge. Go and Stop need to find the suspect.
23	23	"Bunch of Bugs"	Unknown	Unknown	TBA	None	19 February 2025
Go and Stop want to help Frog cross the mud, just like how they did it with Arty, with the Moving Crew! But there's a problem: there are bugs! How will Frog cross the bugs without squishing them?
24	24	"Potted Plant Parade"	Unknown	Unknown	TBA	None	20 February 2025
Go and Stop help Toad grow a new potted plant, one with eight flowers, with the help of Grow Flower and Split in Two.
25	25	"Again!"	Unknown	Unknown	TBA	Again and Again and Again	21 February 2025
Go and Stop meet a new friend - Again.
26	26	"Here We Go Again"	Simon Taylor	Santiago Alarcon	TBA	None	24 February 2025
Go, Stop and Push help Toad get to his meeting on his rail cart. Fortunately, Again comes, and the friends reach their destination.
27	27	"Giant Beanstalk"	Simon Taylor	Simon Taylor	TBA	None	25 February 2025
With a giant magic bean, Go, Stop, Again and Grow Leaf grow a giant beanstalk!
28	28	"Bouncy Castle"	Unknown	Unknown	TBA	None	26 February 2025
Arty wants to surprise Again with a stripy pattern for the bouncy castle, with the help of Splat Red, Yellow and Blue.
29	29	"Ice Cream Bears"	Unknown	Tiernan Douieb	TBA	None	27 February 2025
Little Bear doesn't know exactly how much scoops everyone has ordered. Go, Stop, Again and Scoop Ice Cream help him remember.
30	30	"It's Wonderful What You Can Do"	Unknown	Unknown	TBA	It's Wonderful What You Can Do	28 February 2025
Go, Stop and Again are the compères for the talent show. Cow, the Three Bears and Arty finally done their talents!
