= Numberblocks =

British educational television series

- Genre: Educational; Preschool
- Created by: Joe Elliot
- Written by: Max Allen; Ben Lee Delisle; Ciaran Murtagh; Andrew Jones
- Directed by: Simon Taylor (series); Will Cook (animation); Lisa Huxstep (animation)
- Voices of: Beth Chalmers; Sharon D. Clarke; Teresa Gallagher; Rasmus Hardiker; David Holt; Marcel McCalla; Emma Tate; Rosalie Craig; Gregory Porter; Sooz Kempner; Andy Davies; Kareña K. Ashton; Paul Kissaun; David Carling
- Composer: Ben Lee Delisle
- Country of origin: United Kingdom
- Original language: English
- No. of series: 9
- No. of episodes: 188 (including specials); 205 (including Numbersong shorts)

Production
- Executive producers: Joe Elliot; Oli Hyatt; Catherine McAllister (CBeebies); Joel Wilenius (CBeebies)
- Editor: Steve Hughes
- Running time: 2-3 minutes (numbersongs); 5 minutes (main series); 10–20 minutes (specials)
- Production companies: Blue-Zoo; Alphablocks Ltd.

Original release
- Network: CBeebies
- Release: 23 January 2017 – present

Related
- Alphablocks; Colourblocks; Wonderblocks

Numberblocks is a British children's animated television series that first aired on CBeebies on 23 January 2017. The programme was created by Joe Elliot and produced by Alphablocks Ltd with Blue Zoo. It was commissioned by the BBC, with Larkshead Media and Learning Resources holding merchandising rights.

The show follows the Numberblocks, characters made of blocks who represent numbers. They live on a fictional planet called Numberland and embark on adventures relating to mathematical concepts. In 2017, the show was nominated for a BAFTA award in the "Learning" category.

== Premise ==
The plots of Numberblocks episodes revolve around the adventures of anthropomorphic, colourful block characters in Numberland, each made up of a certain number of blocks, while representing and being named after that number. A black floating number, called a Numberling, appears above their heads to show their value and help them identify one another. They have the ability to merge and split into any number. Most Numberblocks have styles and personalities related to their numbers.

The show helps children learn numeracy skills, especially how to count and do simple mathematics. Integer concepts, such as factoring and the concepts of odd and even numbers, are explored. More sophisticated ideas are also explored in later episodes such as comparison, square numbers, and triangular numbers (known as "Step Squads" in the series), as well as counting using binary numbers.

== Production ==
Kay Benbow of BBC Studios commissioned Numberblocks as an animated series for children aged 3–6 to be developed by Essex production company Blue Zoo. The production was made in partnership with the National Centre for Excellence in the Teaching of Mathematics (NCETM) to complement the Alphablocks series. Created by Joe Elliot, the series was made to give children a deep understanding of how numbers work. Elliot wanted to visually show the concepts of maths in a way no other number series had, as he thought many people struggled with how the subject is taught. In October 2018, Aardman Animations' international sales and acquisitions arm acquired the distribution rights to the show, along with Alphablocks.

== Episodes ==
Series	Episodes	Originally released	
Series	Episodes	First released	Last released
1	15	23 January 2017	10 February 2017
2	15	1 May 2017	19 May 2017
3	30	24 September 2018	1 February 2019
Numbersongs	17	26 April 2019	19 December 2025
4	30	10 June 2019	16 August 2019
5	30	8 March 2021	25 June 2021
Specials	8	27 August 2021	14 February 2022
6	15	4 March 2024	22 March 2024
7	15	19 August 2024	26 August 2024
8	30	18 August 2025	27 February 2026
9 (Mini-Series)	5	7 September 2026	11 September 2026

=== Series 1 (2017) ===
No. overall	No. in season	Title (Note: Information is taken from the BBC iPlayer.)	Directed by (Note: Information is taken from the closing credits of each episode.)	Written by	Original release date
1	1	"One"	Simon Taylor (Series Director) and Miquel Cabot (Animation Lead)	Ben Lee-Delisle, Joe Elliot	23 January 2017
Learn all about the number 1 with Numberblock One herself, as she sings a song about how it's like to be the only one.
2	2	"Another One"	Simon Taylor (Series Director) and Miquel Cabot (Animation Lead)	Joe Elliot, Ciaran Murtagh, & Andrew Jones	24 January 2017
One finds out about the "Magic Mirror" and uses it to make Two.
3	3	"Two"	Simon Taylor (Series Director) and Krissy Josephides (Animation Lead)	Ben Lee-Delisle, Joe Elliot	25 January 2017
Two sings a song about how everything is better with two people.
4	4	"Three"	Simon Taylor (Series Director) and Krissy Josephides (Animation Lead)	Ben Lee-Delisle, Joe Elliot	26 January 2017
Three is introduced and does a show.
5	5	"One, Two, Three"	Simon Taylor (Series Director) and Mariella Capasso (Animation Lead)	Ciaran Murtagh & Andrew Jones	27 January 2017
One, Two, and Three play games involving apples.
6	6	"Four"	Simon Taylor (Series Director) and Mariella Capasso (Animation Lead)	Ben Lee-Delisle, Ciaran Murtagh, & Andrew Jones	30 January 2017
Four is introduced and sings a song about the number four.
7	7	"Five"	Simon Taylor (Series Director) and Krissy Josephides (Animation Lead)	Ben Lee-Delisle, Ciaran Murtagh, & Andrew Jones	31 January 2017
Five is introduced and sings a song about the number five.
8	8	"Three Little Pigs"	Simon Taylor (Series Director) and Miquel Cabot (Animation Lead)	Ciaran Murtagh & Andrew Jones	1 February 2017
One to Five recreate "The Three Little Pigs".
9	9	"Off We Go!"	Simon Taylor (Series Director) and Lizzie Hicks (Animation Lead)	Joe Elliot	2 February 2017
10	10	"How To Count"	Simon Taylor (Series Director) and Miquel Cabot (Animation Lead)	Ciaran Murtagh & Andrew Jones	3 February 2017
11	11	"Stampolines"	Simon Taylor (Series Director) and Miquel Cabot (Animation Lead)	Ciaran Murtagh & Andrew Jones	6 February 2017
12	12	"The Whole of Me"	Simon Taylor (Series Director and Tony Trimmer (Artistic Director)	Ciaran Murtagh & Andrew Jones	8 February 2017
13	13	"The Terrible Twos"	Simon Taylor (Series Director) and Mariella Capasso (Animation Lead)	Joe Elliot, Ciaran Murtagh, & Andrew Jones	7 February 2017
14	14	"Holes"	Simon Taylor (Series Director) and Krissy Josephides (Animation Lead)	Joe Elliot	9 February 2017
15	15	"Hide & Seek"	Simon Taylor (Series Director) and Mariella Capasso (Animation Lead)	Joe Elliot	10 February 2017

=== Series 2 (2017) ===
No. overall	No. in season	Title	Directed by	Written by	Original release date
16	1	"Six"	Simon Taylor (Series Director) and Krissy Josephides (Animation Lead)	Ben Lee-Delisle & Joe Elliot	1 May 2017
17	2	"Seven"	Simon Taylor (Series Director) and Alec Smith (Animation Director)	Ben Lee-Delisle & Andrew Jones	2 May 2017
18	3	"Eight"	Simon Taylor (Series Director) and Alec Smith (Animation Director)	Ben Lee-Delisle & Joe Elliot	3 May 2017
19	4	"Nine"	Simon Taylor (Series Director) and Alec Smith (Animation Director)	Ben Lee-Delisle & Joe Elliot	4 May 2017
20	5	"Ten"	Simon Taylor, (Series Director) Alec Smith and Krissy Josephides (Animation Directors)	Ben Lee-Delisle & Joe Elliot	5 May 2017
21	6	"Just Add One"	Simon Taylor (Series Director) and Krissy Josephides (Animation Lead)	Joe Elliot	8 May 2017
22	7	"Blast Off"	Simon Taylor, (Series Director) Alec Smith and Krissy Josephides (Animation Directors)	Max Allen	9 May 2017
23	8	"Counting Sheep"	Simon Taylor, (Series Director) Alec Smith and Krissy Josephides (Animation Directors)	Ciaran Murtagh & Andrew Jones	10 May 2017
24	9	"Double Trouble"	Simon Taylor (Series Director) and Krissy Josephides (Animation Lead)	Max Allen	11 May 2017
25	10	"The Three Threes"	Simon Taylor (Series Director) and Krissy Josephides (Animation Lead)	Max Allen & Joe Elliot	12 May 2017
26	11	"Odds and Evens"	Simon Taylor, (Series Director) Alec Smith and Krissy Josephides (Animation Directors)	Ciaran Murtagh & Andrew Jones	15 May 2017
27	12	"Fluffies"	Simon Taylor (Series Director) and Krissy Josephides (Animation Lead)	Joe Elliot	16 May 2017
28	13	"The Two Tree"	Simon Taylor, (Series Director) Alec Smith and Krissy Josephides (Animation Directors)	Max Allen	17 May 2017
29	14	"Numberblock Castle"	Simon Taylor, (Series Director) Alec Smith and Krissy Josephides (Animation Directors)	Ciaran Murtagh & Andrew Jones	18 May 2017
30	15	"Ten Green Bottles"	Simon Taylor, (Series Director) Alec Smith and Krissy Josephides (Animation Directors)	Max Allen & Joe Elliot	19 May 2017

=== Series 3 (2018–19) ===
No. overall	No. in season	Title	Directed by	Written by	Original release date
31	1	"Once Upon a Time"	Simon Taylor (Series Director) and Will Cook (Animation Director)	Ciaran Murtagh & Andrew Jones	24 September 2018
32	2	"Blockzilla"	Simon Taylor (Series Director) and Will Cook (Animation Director)	Joe Elliot	25 September 2018
33	3	"The Numberblocks Express"	Simon Taylor (Series Director) and Will Cook (Animation Director)	Joe Elliot	26 September 2018
34	4	"Fruit Salad"	Simon Taylor (Series Director) and Will Cook (Animation Director)	Ciaran Murtagh & Andrew Jones	27 September 2018
35	5	"Zero"	Simon Taylor (Series Director) and Will Cook (Animation Director)	Ben Lee-Delisle, Joe Elliot	28 September 2018
36	6	"Now We Are Six to Ten"	Simon Taylor (Series Director) and Will Cook (Animation Director)	Ciaran Murtagh & Andrew Jones	1 October 2018
37	7	"Numberblobs"	Simon Taylor (Series Director) and Will Cook (Animation Director)	Ben Lee-Delisle & Joe Elliot	2 October 2018
38	8	"Building Blocks"	Simon Taylor (Series Director) and Will Cook (Animation Director)	Max Allen	3 October 2018
39	9	"Peekaboo!"	Simon Taylor (Series Director) and Will Cook (Animation Director)	Ben Lee-Delisle & Joe Elliot	4 October 2018
40	10	"Hiccups"	Simon Taylor (Series Director) and Will Cook (Animation Director)	Joe Elliot	5 October 2018
41	11	"What's the Difference?"	Simon Taylor (Series Director) and Will Cook (Animation Director)	Ben Lee-Delisle & Joe Elliot	8 October 2018
42	12	"Numberblock Rally"	Simon Taylor (Series Director) and Will Cook (Animation Director)	Ciaran Murtagh & Andrew Jones	9 October 2018
43	13	"Five and Friends"	Simon Taylor (Series Director) and Will Cook (Animation Director)	Ciaran Murtagh & Andrew Jones	10 October 2018
44	14	"Octoblock to the Rescue!"	Simon Taylor (Series Director) and Will Cook (Animation Director)	Max Allen	11 October 2018
45	15	"Ten Again"	Simon Taylor (Series Director) and Will Cook (Animation Director)	Ben Lee-Delisle & Joe Elliot	12 October 2018
46	16	"Flatland"	Simon Taylor (Series Director) and Will Cook (Animation Director)	Joe Elliot	15 October 2018
47	17	"Pattern Palace"	Simon Taylor (Series Director) and Will Cook (Animation Director)	Joe Elliot	16 October 2018
48	18	"Legend of The Big Tum"	Simon Taylor (Series Director) and Will Cook (Animation Director)	Ciaran Murtagh & Andrew Jones	17 October 2018
49	19	"Mirror, Mirror"	Simon Taylor (Series Director) and Will Cook (Animation Director)	Ciaran Murtagh & Andrew Jones	18 October 2018
50	20	"The Wrong Number"	Simon Taylor (Series Director) and Will Cook (Animation Director)	Max Allen	19 October 2018
51	21	"Eleven"	Simon Taylor (Series Director) and Will Cook (Animation Director)	Ben Lee-Delisle & Joe Elliot	21 January 2019
52	22	"Twelve"	Simon Taylor (Series Director) and Will Cook (Animation Director)	Ben Lee-Delisle & Joe Elliot	22 January 2019
53	23	"The Way of the Rectangle"	Simon Taylor (Series Director) and Will Cook (Animation Director)	Ciaran Murtagh & Andrew Jones	23 January 2019
54	24	"Ride the Rays"	Simon Taylor (Series Director) and Will Cook (Animation Director)	Ciaran Murtagh & Andrew Jones	25 January 2019
55	25	"Block Star"	Simon Taylor (Series Director) and Will Cook (Animation Director)	Max Allen	24 January 2019
56	26	"Thirteen"	Simon Taylor (Series Director) and Will Cook (Animation Director)	Ben Lee-Delisle & Joe Elliot	28 January 2019
57	27	"Fourteen"	Simon Taylor (Series Director) and Will Cook (Animation Director)	Ben Lee-Delisle	29 January 2019
58	28	"Fifteen"	Simon Taylor (Series Director) and Will Cook (Animation Director)	Ben Lee-Delisle & Joe Elliot	30 January 2019
59	29	"Tween Scenes"	Simon Taylor (Series Director) and Will Cook (Animation Director)	Ciaran Murtagh & Andrew Jones	31 January 2019
60	30	"Step Squads"	Simon Taylor (Series Director) and Will Cook (Animation Director)	Max Allen	1 February 2019

=== Numbersongs (2019–25) ===
No. in season	Title	Directed by	Original release date
1	"Five Little Speckled Frogs"	Simon Taylor (Series Director)	26 April 2019
2	"Zoom Zoom Zoom!"	Simon Taylor (Series Director)	26 April 2019
3	"Scoop a Scoop"	Simon Taylor (Series Director)	26 April 2019
4	"Who Has More?"	Simon Taylor (Series Director)	26 April 2019
5	"Five Little Boats"	Simon Taylor (Series Director)	26 April 2019
6	"Days of Spring"	Simon Taylor (Series Director)	26 April 2019
7	"How Many Passengers?"	Simon Taylor (Series Director)	3 May 2019
8	"Lets All Draw Numbers"	Simon Taylor (Series Director)	3 May 2019
9	"Hen House Hop"	Simon Taylor (Series Director)	3 May 2019
10	"Counting Cars"	Simon Taylor (Series Director)	3 May 2019
11	"How Many Sleeps 'Till Christmas?"	Nathan Wilkes	15 December 2022
12	"Seven Little Ducks"	Nathan Wilkes	25 April 2024
13	"Numberblocks Birthday Song"	Nathan Wilkes	5 August 2024
14	"The Octoblock Song"	Nathan Wilkes	26 December 2024
15	"The Driving Dance"	Nathan Wilkes	8 August 2025
16	"Three's Counting Cars"	Nathan Wilkes	17 October 2025
17	"Stop That Sleigh!"	Unknown	14 November 2025
18	"Making Christmas Magical"	Nathan Wilkes	19 December 2025

=== Series 4 (2019) ===
No. overall	No. in season	Title	Directed by	Written by	Original release date
61	1	"Fifteen's Minute of Fame"	Simon Taylor (Series Director) and Will Cook (Animation Lead)	Max Allen	10 June 2019
62	2	"On Your Head"	Simon Taylor (Series Director) and Will Cook (Animation Director)	Ciaran Murtagh & Andrew Jones	11 June 2019
63	3	"Ten's Place"	Simon Taylor (Series Director) and Will Cook (Animation Director)	Joe Elliot	12 June 2019
64	4	"Balancing Bridge"	Simon Taylor (Series Director) and Will Cook (Animation Director)	Ciaran Murtagh & Andrew Jones	13 June 2019
65	5	"Sixteen"	Simon Taylor (Series Director) and Will Cook (Animation Director)	Joe Elliot	14 June 2019
66	6	"Square Club"	Simon Taylor (Series Director) and Will Cook (Animation Director)	Max Allen	17 June 2019
67	7	"Seventeen"	Simon Taylor (Series Director) and Will Cook (Animation Director)	Ben Lee-Delisle & Joe Elliot	18 June 2019
68	8	"Eighteen"	Simon Taylor (Series Director) and Will Cook (Animation Director)	Ben Lee-Delisle & Joe Elliot	19 June 2019
69	9	"Loop the Loop"	Simon Taylor (Series Director) and Will Cook (Animation Director)	Ciaran Murtagh & Andrew Jones	20 June 2019
70	10	"Nineteen"	Simon Taylor (Series Director) and Will Cook (Animation Director)	Ben Lee-Delisle & Joe Elliot	21 June 2019
71	11	"Twenty"	Simon Taylor (Series Director) and Will Cook (Animation Director)	Ben Lee-Delisle & Joe Elliot	8 July 2019
72	12	"Tall Stories"	Simon Taylor (Series Director) and Will Cook (Animation Director)	Ciaran Murtagh & Andrew Jones	9 July 2019
73	13	"Flights of Fancy"	Simon Taylor (Series Director) and Will Cook (Animation Director)	Ciaran Murtagh & Andrew Jones	10 July 2019
74	14	"I Can Count To Twenty"	Simon Taylor (Series Director) and Will Cook (Animation Director)	Max Allen	11 July 2019
75	15	"Heist"	Simon Taylor (Series Director) and Will Cook (Animation Director)	Max Allen	12 July 2019
76	16	"Sign of the Times"	Simon Taylor (Series Director) and Will Cook (Animation Director)	Ciaran Murtagh & Andrew Jones	15 July 2019
77	17	"Fun Times Fair"	Simon Taylor (Series Director) and Will Cook (Animation Director)	Max Allen	16 July 2019
78	18	"The Lair of Shares"	Simon Taylor (Series Director) and Will Cook (Animation Director)	Max Allen	17 July 2019
79	19	"Terrible Twosday"	Simon Taylor (Series Director) and Will Cook (Animation Director)	Ciaran Murtagh & Andrew Jones	18 July 2019
80	20	"Divide and Drive"	Simon Taylor (Series Director) and Will Cook (Animation Director)	Ciaran Murtagh & Andrew Jones	19 July 2019
81	21	"Twenty-One and On"	Simon Taylor (Series Director) and Will Cook (Animation Director)	Ciaran Murtagh & Andrew Jones	5 August 2019
82	22	"We're Going on a Square Hunt"	Simon Taylor (Series Director) and Will Cook (Animation Director)	Max Allen	6 August 2019
83	23	"Thirty's Big Top"	Simon Taylor (Series Director) and Will Cook (Animation Director)	Ciaran Murtagh & Andrew Jones	7 August 2019
84	24	"Land of the Giants"	Simon Taylor (Series Director) and Will Cook (Animation Director)	Ciaran Murtagh & Andrew Jones	8 August 2019
85	25	"Fifty"	Simon Taylor (Series Director) and Will Cook (Animation Director)	Ben Lee-Delisle & Joe Elliot	9 August 2019
86	26	"Sixty's High Score"	Simon Taylor (Series Director) and Will Cook (Animation Director)	Ciaran Murtagh & Andrew Jones	12 August 2019
87	27	"The Big One"	Simon Taylor (Series Director) and Will Cook (Animation Director)	Ciaran Murtagh & Andrew Jones	13 August 2019
88	28	"One Hundred"	Simon Taylor (Series Director) and Will Cook (Animation Director)	Ben Lee-Delisle & Joe Elliot	14 August 2019
89	29	"One Thousand and One"	Simon Taylor (Series Director) and Will Cook (Animation Director)	Joe Elliot	15 August 2019
90	30	"More to Explore"	Simon Taylor (Series Director) and Will Cook (Animation Director)	Ben Lee-Delisle & Joe Elliot	16 August 2019

=== Series 5 (2021) ===
No. overall	No. in season	Title	Directed by	Written by	Original release date
91	1	"Your Turn"	Simon Taylor, (Series Director) Lisa Huxstep and Megan Pearce (Lead Animators)	Ciaran Murtagh & Andrew Barnett Jones	8 March 2021
92	2	"Now You See Us"	Simon Taylor, (Series Director) Lisa Huxstep and Megan Pearce (Lead Animators)	Ciaran Murtagh & Andrew Barnett Jones	9 March 2021
93	3	"Ten's Top Ten"	Simon Taylor, (Series Director) Lisa Huxstep and Damon Winterburn (Lead Animators)	Ben Lee-Delisle, Joe Elliot, Ciaran Murtagh & Andrew Barnett Jones	10 March 2021
94	4	"What's My Number?"	Simon Taylor, (Series Director) Lisa Huxstep and Steve Kimbrey (Lead Animators)	Max Allen, Ciaran Murtagh & Andrew Barnett Jones	11 March 2021
95	5	"Fun Times One Times Table"	Simon Taylor, (Series Director) Lisa Huxstep and Damon Winterburn (Lead Animators)	Ben Lee-Delisle, Joe Elliot, Ciaran Murtagh & Andrew Barnett Jones	12 March 2021
96	6	"The Many Friends of Twenty"	Simon Taylor, (Series Director) Lisa Huxstep and Megan Pearce (Lead Animators)	Max Allen, Ciaran Murtagh & Andrew Barnett Jones	15 March 2021
97	7	"Ten Vaulting"	Simon Taylor, (Series Director) Lisa Huxstep and Steve Kimbrey (Lead Animators)	Ciaran Murtagh & Andrew Barnett Jones	16 March 2021
98	8	"Twoland"	Simon Taylor, (Series Director) Lisa Huxstep and Steve Kimbrey (Lead Animators)	Joe Elliot, Ciaran Murtagh & Andrew Barnett Jones	17 March 2021
99	9	"Two Times Shoe Shop"	Simon Taylor, (Series Director) Lisa Huxstep and Megan Pearce (Lead Animators)	Ben Lee-Delisle, Joe Elliot, Ciaran Murtagh & Andrew Barnett Jones	18 March 2021
100	10	"Odd Side Story"	Simon Taylor, (Series Director) Lisa Huxstep and Megan Pearce (Lead Animators)	Joe Elliot, Ciaran Murtagh & Andrew Barnett Jones	19 March 2021
101	11	"How Rectangly!"	Simon Taylor, (Series Director) Lisa Huxstep and Damon Winterburn (Lead Animators)	Ciaran Murtagh & Andrew Barnett Jones	22 March 2021
102	12	"Rectangle Racers"	Simon Taylor, (Series Director) Lisa Huxstep and Steve Kimbrey (Lead Animators)	Max Allen, Ciaran Murtagh & Andrew Barnett Jones	23 March 2021
103	13	"The Team Factor"	Simon Taylor, (Series Director) Lisa Huxstep and Damon Winterburn (Lead Animators)	Joe Elliot, Ciaran Murtagh & Andrew Barnett Jones	24 March 2021
104	14	"Hidden Talents"	Simon Taylor, (Series Director) Lisa Huxstep and Megan Pearce (Lead Animators)	Ciaran Murtagh & Andrew Barnett Jones	25 March 2021
105	15	"Making Patterns"	Simon Taylor, (Series Director) Lisa Huxstep and Steve Kimbrey (Lead Animators)	Ciaran Murtagh & Andrew Barnett Jones	26 March 2021
106	16	"Now in 3D"	Simon Taylor, (Series Director) Lisa Huxstep and Steve Kimbrey (Lead Animators)	Joe Elliot, Ciaran Murtagh & Andrew Barnett Jones	7 June 2021
107	17	"Club Picnic"	Simon Taylor, (Series Director) Lisa Huxstep and Steve Kimbrey (Lead Animators)	Ciaran Murtagh & Andrew Barnett Jones	8 June 2021
108	18	"Too Many Threes"	Simon Taylor, (Series Director) Lisa Huxstep and Megan Pearce (Lead Animators)	Max Allen, Ciaran Murtagh & Andrew Barnett Jones	9 June 2021
109	19	"Circus of Threes"	Simon Taylor, (Series Director) Lisa Huxstep and Damon Winterburn (Lead Animators)	Ben Lee-Delisle, Joe Elliot, Ciaran Murtagh & Andrew Barnett Jones	10 June 2021
110	20	"Figure It Out"	Simon Taylor, (Series Director) Lisa Huxstep & Charlotte-Binnie Thompson (Lead Animators)	Ben Lee-Delisle, Joe Elliot, Ciaran Murtagh & Andrew Barnett Jones	11 June 2021
111	21	"Snow Day Doubles"	Simon Taylor, (Series Director) Lisa Huxstep and Steve Kimbrey (Lead Animators)	Ciaran Murtagh & Andrew Barnett Jones	14 June 2021
112	22	"Steps Versus Squares"	Simon Taylor, (Series Director) Lisa Huxstep and Megan Pearce (Lead Animators)	Max Allen, Ciaran Murtagh & Andrew Barnett Jones	15 June 2021
113	23	"Puzzle Square"	Simon Taylor, (Series Director) Lisa Huxstep & Charlotte-Binnie Thompson (Lead Animators)	Ciaran Murtagh & Andrew Barnett Jones	16 June 2021
114	24	"Four on the Floor"	Simon Taylor, (Series Director) Lisa Huxstep and Steve Kimbrey (Lead Animators)	Ben Lee-Delisle, Joe Elliot, Ciaran Murtagh & Andrew Barnett Jones	17 June 2021
115	25	"Sky High Fives"	Simon Taylor, (Series Director) Lisa Huxstep and Megan Pearce (Lead Animators)	Ben Lee-Delisle, Joe Elliot, Ciaran Murtagh & Andrew Barnett Jones	18 June 2021
116	26	"One Giant Step Squad"	Simon Taylor, (Series Director) Lisa Huxstep & Charlotte-Binnie Thompson (Lead Animators)	Ciaran Murtagh & Andrew Barnett Jones	21 June 2021
117	27	"Square on the Moon"	Simon Taylor, (Series Director) Lisa Huxstep and Megan Pearce (Lead Animators)	Max Allen, Ciaran Murtagh & Andrew Barnett Jones	22 June 2021
118	28	"Heroes with Zeroes"	Simon Taylor, (Series Director) Lisa Huxstep and Steve Kimbrey (Lead Animators)	Ben Lee-Delisle, Joe Elliot, Ciaran Murtagh & Andrew Barnett Jones	23 June 2021
119	29	"What If?"	Simon Taylor, (Series Director) Lisa Huxstep and Steve Kimbrey (Lead Animators)	Ben Lee-Delisle, Joe Elliot, Ciaran Murtagh & Andrew Barnett Jones	24 June 2021
120	30	"100 Ways to Leave the Planet"	Simon Taylor, (Series Director) Lisa Huxstep & Charlotte-Binnie Thompson (Lead Animators)	Joe Elliot, Ciaran Murtagh & Andrew Barnett Jones	25 June 2021

=== Specials (2021–22) ===
No. in season	Title	Directed by	Written by	Original release date
1	"Double Back"	Simon Taylor, (Series Director) Liza Huxstep & Steve Kimbrey (Lead Animators)	Max Allen, Ciaran Murtagh & Andrew Barnett Jones	27 August 2021
2	"The Treasure of Hexagon Island"	Simon Taylor, (Series Director) Liza Huxstep & Megan Pearce	Ciaran Murtagh & Andrew Barnett Jones	27 August 2021
3	"About Time"	Simon Taylor, (Series Director) Lisa Huxstep & Steve Kimbrey (Lead Animators)	Joe Elliot, Ben Lee-Delisle, Ciaran Murtagh & Andrew Barnett Jones	31 October 2021
4	"The Twelve Days of Christmas"	Simon Taylor, (Series Director) Lisa Huxstep & Charlotte-Binnie Thompson (Lead Animators)	Ciaran Murtagh & Andrew Barnett Jones	12 December 2021
5	"Making Friends"	Simon Taylor, (Series Director) Lisa Huxstep & Charlotte-Binnie Thompson (Lead Animators)	Ciaran Murtagh & Andrew Barnett Jones	14 February 2022
Note: This episode was part of the Alphablocks & Numberblocks crossover series.
6	"The Case of the Missing Blocks"	Simon Taylor, (Series Director) Lisa Huxstep & Megan Pearce (Lead Animators)	Ciaran Murtagh & Andrew Barnett Jones	14 February 2022
Note: This episode was part of the Alphablocks & Numberblocks crossover series.
7	"The Blocks v Blocks Games"	Simon Taylor, (Series Director) Lisa Huxstep & Steve Kimbrey (Lead Animators)	Ciaran Murtagh & Andrew Barnett Jones	14 February 2022
Note: This episode was part of the Alphablocks & Numberblocks crossover series.
8	"Crossover"	Simon Taylor, (Series Director) Lisa Huxstep & Steve Kimbrey (Lead Animators)	Max Allen, Ciaran Murtagh & Andrew Barnett Jones	14 February 2022
Note: This episode was part of the Alphablocks & Numberblocks crossover series.

=== Series 6 (2024) ===
No. overall	No. in season	Title	Directed by	Written by	Original release date
121	1	"Painting by Numbers"	Simon Taylor	Ciaran Murtagh, Andrew Barnett Jones	4 March 2024
122	2	"Leap Blob"	Simon Taylor	Ciaran Murtagh, Andrew Barnett Jones	5 March 2024
123	3	"Ice and Dice"	Simon Taylor (probably)	Unknown	6 March 2024
124	4	"Go Go Domino"	Unknown	Unknown	7 March 2024
125	5	"Ten in the Bed"	Unknown	Unknown	8 March 2024
126	6	"Shape Party"	Unknown	Unknown	11 March 2024
127	7	"Can We Have Our Ball Back?"	Unknown	Unknown	12 March 2024
128	8	"Cuboid Castle"	Unknown	Unknown	13 March 2024
129	9	"On My Way to Numberblock Fair"	Unknown	Unknown	14 March 2024
130	10	"Octoblock and the Path of Justice"	Unknown	Unknown	15 March 2024
131	11	"Five's Handy Shop"	Unknown	Unknown	18 March 2024
132	12	"As Tall as the Sun"	Unknown	Unknown	19 March 2024
133	13	"Feeding Time"	Unknown	Unknown	20 March 2024
134	14	"Rockets and Rekenreks"	Unknown	Unknown	21 March 2024
135	15	"The Pattern of Patterns"	Unknown	Unknown	22 March 2024

=== Series 7 (2024) ===
No. overall	No. in season	Title	Directed by	Written by	Original release date
136	1	"Grid Unlocked"	Will Lloyd-Cook, Andrew West (voices), Maurcio Maia (animation)	Darren Jones	19 August 2024
137	2	"Friendly Fours' Beach Day"	Will Lloyd-Cook	Ciaran Murtagh, Andrew Barnett Jones	20 August 2024
138	3	"All-Star Line-Up"	Will Lloyd-Cook, Andrew West (voice), Mauricio Maia (animation)	Ciaran Murtagh, Andrew Barnett Jones	21 August 2024
139	4	"Rescue Racers"	Will Lloyd-Cook, Andrew West (voices), Mauricio Maia (animation)	Andrew Emerson	22 August 2024
140	5	"The Rolling Sixes"	Will Lloyd-Cook	Ciaran Murtagh, Andrew Barnett Jones	23 August 2024
141	6	"Remix the Sixes"	Simon Taylor	Ben Lee Delisle, Joe Elliot	26 August 2024
142	7	"Grid Games Galore"	Will Lloyd-Cook	Andrew Viner	27 August 2024
143	8	"The Rainbow Makers"	Will Lloyd-Cook	Ciaran Murtagh, Andrew Barnett Jones	28 August 2024
144	9	"Sail the Seven Seas"	Will Lloyd-Cook	Ciaran Murtagh, Andrew Barnett Jones, Ben Lee-Delisle	29 August 2024
145	10	"We Need Another Hero"	Will Lloyd-Cook	Andrew Viner, Ciaran Murtagh, Andrew Barnett Jones	30 August 2024
146	11	"Super Eights Assemble"	Will Lloyd-Cook	Ciaran Murtagh, Andrew Barnett Jones, Ben Lee-Delisle	2 September 2024
147	12	"Seventy-Two's Super Surprise"	Mauricio Maia (Art)	Darren Jones	3 September 2024
148	13	"The Magical Nines"	Will Lloyd-Cook	Ciaran Murtagh and Andrew Barnett Jones (head writers), Andrew Emerson (writer)	4 September 2024
149	14	"Nine's Time to Shine"	Will Lloyd-Cook	Ciaran Murtagh, Andrew Barnett Jones, and Ben Lee-Delisle	5 September 2024
150	15	"Space Division"	Will Lloyd-Cook	Ciaran Murtagh and Andrew Barnett Jones	6 September 2024

=== Series 8 (2025–26) ===
No. overall	No. in season	Title	Directed by	Written by	Original release date
151	1	"The Third Button"	Francesca Adams	Darren Jones	18 August 2025
152	2	"The Great Bug Race"	Unknown	Unknown	19 August 2025
153	3	"The Big Picture"	Unknown	Unknown	20 August 2025
154	4	"Space Repair"	Unknown	Unknown	21 August 2025
155	5	"Capacity for Magic"	Unknown	Unknown	22 August 2025
156	6	"How Many Smoothies?"	Unknown	Unknown	22 August 2025
157	7	"Odd Block Club"	Unknown	Unknown	25 August 2025
158	8	"Five Makes a Wish"	Unknown	Unknown	26 August 2025
159	9	"Number Rescue, Go!"	Unknown	Unknown	27 August 2025
160	10	"The Best House Band in Numberland"	Unknown	Unknown	28 August 2025
161	11	"Double Duets"	Unknown	Unknown	29 August 2025
162	12	"Double Doors, Double Locked"	Unknown	Unknown	1 September 2025
163	13	"The All-Knowing Nine"	Unknown	Unknown	2 September 2025
164	14	"Subtraction Somersaults"	Unknown	Unknown	3 September 2025
165	15	"Tenpin Tournament"	Unknown	Unknown	4 September 2025
166	16	"Five's Super Sorter"	Unknown	Unknown	9 February 2026
167	17	"Back in the Box!"	Unknown	Unknown	10 February 2026
168	18	"Five's Fruit Festival"	Unknown	Unknown	11 February 2026
169	19	"I'll Vote for That!"	Unknown	Unknown	12 February 2026
170	20	"The Pyramid of Puzzles"	Unknown	Unknown	13 February 2026
171	21	"One's Fix-It Shop"	Unknown	Unknown	16 February 2026
172	22	"Happy Campers"	Unknown	Unknown	17 February 2026
173	23	"The Mystery of Fraction Island"	Unknown	Unknown	18 February 2026
174	24	"Fractions Are a Piece of Cake"	Unknown	Unknown	19 February 2026
175	25	"Octonaughty and the Fractionator"	Unknown	Unknown	20 February 2026
176	26	"You're Five Ones and I'm Five Tens"	Unknown	Unknown	23 February 2026
177	27	"The Forest of Tens"	Unknown	Unknown	24 February 2026
178	28	"All the Numbers I Can Be"	Unknown	Unknown	25 February 2026
179	29	"The Rings of Unity"	Unknown	Unknown	26 February 2026
180	30	"The Space Signal"	Unknown	Unknown	27 February 2026

=== Series 9: Miniseries (2026) ===
This series is also called Series 9: The Rise of Infinaughty.

No. in season	Title	Directed by	Written by	Original release date
1	"The Day the Blocks Turned Pink"	Simon Taylor	Unknown	7 September 2026
2	"An Even Split"	Simon Taylor	Unknown	8 September 2026
3	"Trying Times"	Simon Taylor	Unknown	9 September 2026
4	"The Rectangular Wreck"	Simon Taylor	Unknown	10 September 2026
5	"Everybody Counts"	Simon Taylor	Unknown	11 September 2026

== Other media ==
UK-based kids media service company Larkshead Media was appointed to manage licensing activities for Numberblocks in August 2017; the agency announced that merchandise including toys and apparel would be brought to retail. In July 2020, a MathLink Cubes activity set inspired by the show was announced by Learning Resources to be available through major retailers later in the year. The set, featuring characters One to Ten, was delayed and released in June 2021. In September, Immediate Media launched an official magazine for the show, with the first issue released on 8 September 2021. Fancy dress distributor Rubies announced an official dress up licence for Numberblocks in October, with costumes planned to be available in the EMEA and Australia in 2022. Learning Resources secured a global master licensing deal for Numberblocks in November 2021, announcing the release of plush toys in 2022 followed by playsets, video games and classroom items with sister company hand2mind by 2023.
