= Beyond the Grave =

Beyond the Grave may refer to:

- Afterlife, a postulated continued existence after death
- Beyond the Grave (Gungrave), the protagonist of the video game series Gungrave
- Beyond the Grave (novel), a 2009 novel by Jude Watson

== See also ==
- Beyond the Gravy, a British radio programme
- From Beyond the Grave, a 1974 British film
