= Digby Dragon =

Television series

- Genre: Comedy
- Created by: Sally Hunter
- Written by: Tim Bain; Myles McLeod; Steve Cannon; Sally Hunter; Ciaran Murtagh; Andrew Jones; Laura Beaumont; Paul Larson
- Directed by: Adam Shaw; Aditya Guptya
- Voices of: Clark Devlin; Rasmus Hardiker; Dustin Demri-Burns; Ainsley Howard; Lucy Montgomery; Mark Heap; Clive Russell
- Composers: David Schweitzer; Rich House; Doug Walker
- Country of origin: United Kingdom
- Original language: English
- No. of series: 2
- No. of episodes: 78

Production
- Running time: 11 minutes
- Production company: Blue-Zoo Productions

Original release
- Network: Channel 5; Nick Jr.
- Release: 4 July 2016 – 29 July 2019

Digby Dragon is a British CGI-animated preschool television series created by Sally Hunter, which aired from 4 July 2016 to 29 July 2019. It was produced in the UK by Blue-Zoo Productions for Nick Jr.

== Premise ==
Digby is an anthropomorphised dragon who lives in the magical land of Applecross Wood, with a group of friends. These friends include creatures typically found in real-life forests, as well as a variety of magical trolls.

== Voice cast ==
- Clark Devlin as Digby Dragon, a young, green dragon "fledgling" who cannot fly yet.
- Ainsley Howard as Fizzy Izzy, a ditzy but lovable pink fairy, and Digby's best friend.
- Rasmus Hardiker as "Cheeky" Chips, a nut-obsessed red squirrel.
- Dustin Demri-Burns as Grumpy Goblin, the cantankerous local inventor/engineer. He has three pet snails and a train called "Scottie".
- Lucy Montgomery as Grizel, a bad tempered little blue elf that likes causing mischief; Archie, a little grey mouse; and the local delivery girl.
- Mark Heap as Mungo, a scatter-brained and clumsy owl, who serves as Grizel's sidekick.
- Clive Russell as Albert, a good-natured old badger that owns the Applecross grocery shop.
- Spellbook: Fizzy's "Be A Good Fairy Spellbook", who is a bossy, somewhat overbearing magical book.
- Sprite: A fun-loving creature that appears as a ball of golden sparkles.
- Muddles: A mud monster that lives in the Applecross Swamp.
- Mushrooms: Three little mushrooms with faces that hop about the woods.

== Production ==
The development of the series began in 2013, when Blue Zoo Animation Studio collaborated with Bristol-based stop-motion entertainment company Aardman Animations (who previously made CGI-animated films and series like Planet Sketch, Flushed Away and Arthur Christmas) to develop an CGI-animated series created by Sally Hunter entitled Digby Dragon, with Blue Zoo producing and handling animation for the series as Nickelodeon UK had commissioned the series to air on its Nick Jr. channel while Aardman handled worldwide distribution to the series.
