= Ashna Rabheru =

English actress (born 1996 or 1997)

- Born: 1996 or 1997; Basingstoke, Hampshire, England
- Education: Royal Welsh College of Music & Drama
- Years active: 2014–present

Ashna Rabheru (born 1996 or 1997) is an English actress. On television, she is known for her roles in the Channel 4 drama Indian Summers (2015–2016) and the BBC Three horror series Red Rose (2022).

== Early life and education ==
Rabheru was born in Basingstoke, Hampshire and grew up in the Brighton Hill area. She has a brother. Rabheru attended Queen Mary's College. She took classes at the Hunt Academy for Young Actors (HAYA) and the Identity Drama School. She balanced sitting her AS-Levels with filming Indian Summers. She went on to graduate from the Royal Welsh College of Music & Drama in 2018 with a Bachelor of Arts in Acting.

== Career ==
At the age of 17, Rabheru signed with Identity Agency Group and subsequently landed her debut television role in the Channel 4 drama Indian Summers, which premiered in 2015, as Shamshad Dalal, a role she would play for both series.

After graduating from drama school, Rabheru made her professional stage debut in Trojan Horse at the 2018 Edinburgh Fringe Festival and Leeds Playhouse. This was followed by London theatre roles in Top Girls at the National Theatre, (BLANK) at the Donmar Warehouse, Santi & Naz at the VAULT Festival, the fourth edition of Living Newspaper at the Royal Court Theatre, and Outside at the Orange Tree Theatre. She made guest appearances in the Channel 4 sitcom Year of the Rabbit and the Netflix comedy-drama Sex Education.

Rabheru had a main role as Jaya Mahajan in the teen horror series Red Rose, which premiered on BBC Three in 2022 and Netflix in 2023. Rabheru also starred in The Animal Kingdom at the Hampstead Theatre and Ambreen Razia's Favour at the Bush Theatre.

== Filmography ==
=== Film ===
Year	Title	Role	Notes
2014	Is This Thing On?	Reena	Short film
2024	Hard Truths	Cashier	
2024	Joy	Sally	
2026	Tender Loving Care	Jasmine	

=== Television ===
Year	Title	Role	Notes
2015–2016	Indian Summers	Shamshad Dalal	19 episodes
2018	Bounty	Sofia	Television film
2019	Year of the Rabbit	Tilly	Episode: "Hostage"
2020	Sex Education	Gwen	Episode: "Episode 1"
2022	Red Rose	Jaya Mahajan	8 episodes
2022	The Smeds and the Smoos	Janet	Voice role, television film
2024	Renegade Nell	Polly Honeycombe	4 episodes
2025	Wonderblocks	Baa	Voice role, 3 episodes
2025	Film Club	Flo	Episode #1.2

== Stage ==
Year	Title	Role	Notes
2018	Trojan Horse	Farah	Edinburgh Fringe Festival / Leeds Playhouse
2019	Top Girls	Kit	National Theatre, London
2019	(BLANK)		Donmar Warehouse, London
2020	Santi & Naz	Naz	VAULT Festival
2021	Living Newspaper Edition 4	Ensemble	Royal Court Theatre, London
2021	Outside	Bettina	Orange Tree Theatre, London
2022	The Animal Kingdom	Sophie	Hampstead Theatre, London
2022	Favour	Leila	Bush Theatre, London
2024	Abigail's Party	Angela	Theatre Royal Stratford East
