= Those Scurvy Rascals =

- Title card
- Created by: Blue-Zoo Productions
- Starring: Nick Mercer (all voices)
- Country of origin: United Kingdom
- No. of episodes: 26

Production
- Running time: 3.5 minutes (approx. per episode)

Original release
- Network: Nickelodeon UK
- Release: May 20, 2005 – 2006

Those Scurvy Rascals is a children's animated series following the adventures of three underwear-obsessed pirates. First aired by Nickelodeon UK on May 20, 2005, it was broadcast worldwide. The main characters Sissy Le Poop (called Jolly Roger in some versions), Smelly Pete and Shark Bait (plus Polly the Parrot) all live on the ship called "The Soiled Pair" and go on a different random adventure in every episode. The series was developed and produced by Blue-Zoo Productions and is currently distributed by Sky Studios.

== Episodes ==
1. Pilot: Pant Island (2005)
2. Pants Odyssey (2005)
3. Pet Pants (2005)
4. Pantartica (2005)
5. The Great Pantcreas Operation (2005)
6. Scaredy Pants (2005)
7. Under Water Pants (2006)
8. Raiders of the Lost Pants (2006)
9. Mail Pants (2006)
10. Super Pants (2006)
11. Dr Pete & Mr Hyde (2006)
12. Robot Pants (2006)
13. Mama Bait (2006)
14. Fist Full of Pants (2006)
15. Miner Pants (2006)
16. Pirate Pant Pasty (2006)
17. 1001 Arabian Pants (2006)
18. Sumo Pants (2006)
19. Jurassic Pants (2006)
20. Panties Are Forever (2006)
21. Princess and the Pants (2006)
22. Panties on Parade (2006)
23. Gorilla Circus (2006)
24. Pantium 3000 (2006)
25. Lochness Pantster (2006)
26. Pantcake Day (2006)

== Awards ==
- British Academy Children's Awards nomination (2006) for Animation
- British Animation Award (2006) for Best Children's Series
- British Animation Award (2006) for Children's Choice Award
