= Grace Saif =

British actress

- Born: 7 October 1995 (age 31); Manchester, England
- Education: Royal Academy of Dramatic Art (BA)
- Occupation: Actress
- Years active: 2016–present

Grace Saif (born 7 October 1995) is a British actress. She is known for playing Ani Achola in the series 13 Reasons Why and Diana in the video game Pragmata.

== Early life and education ==
Saif was born and grew up in Manchester before she moved to Crawley and attended Hazelwick School. After completing her A-levels, Saif earned a Bachelor of Arts degree in acting from the Royal Academy of Dramatic Art, where she received a bursary from the BAFTA for £4,500. Saif was mentored by Billie Piper at BAFTA and graduated from RADA in 2017.

== Career ==
Saif made an acting debut in Wilton, a short film directed by Cecile Emeke. In 2017, Saif appeared in an episode of the BBC's soap opera, Doctors.

In 2018, Saif appeared in another short film and voiced a character in World of Warcraft: Battle for Azeroth. Saif also performed at Donmar Warehoues in David Harrower's rendition of The Prime of Miss Jean Brodie.

Beginning in 2019, Saif appeared in seasons three and four of 13 Reasons Why.

In 2020, Saif was cast in a short film called The Visit, directed by Ebele Tate. She took part in a Right Here Festival event on 29 January 2020 commissioned by Crawley Creatives. Saif participated in the Jermyn Street Theatre's The Sonnet Project, which also featured Olivia Colman to Helena Bonham Carter, where she performed a rendition of Shakespeare's Sonnet 62.

In 2026, Saif appeared as the voice of Diana in the video game Pragmata.

== Personal life ==
In 2019, Saif deleted her social media accounts after facing online bullying. The accounts were later restored.

== Filmography ==
=== Television ===
Year	Title	Role	Notes
2017	Doctors	Angel Hurley	Episode: "Vigilante Man"
2019–2020	13 Reasons Why	Ani Achola	23 episodes
2025	Wonderblocks	Little Bear (voice)	3 episodes
TBA	Anansi Boys	Daisy Day	Upcoming miniseries

=== Theatre ===
Year	Title	Role	Notes
2018	The Prime of Miss Jean Brodie	Monica	Donmar Warehouse
2024	Ballet Shoes	Pauline Fossil	Royal National Theatre

=== Video games ===
Year	Title	Voice role	Notes
2018	World of Warcraft: Battle for Azeroth	Annie	
2022	Elden Ring	Jar Bairn	
	Xenoblade Chronicles 3	Manana	English dub
2023	Diablo IV	Additional voices	
	Alan Wake II	Additional voices	
2026	Pragmata	Diana	English dub
	Dragon Quest Monsters: The Withered World	Almira	English dub

== Awards and nominations ==
Year	Award	Category	Work	Result	Ref
2022	The Offies	Lead Performance in a Play	Athena at The Yard Theatre	Nominated	
2026	Golden Joystick Awards	Best Supporting Performer	Pragmata	Won	
