= Joe Elliot (television producer) =

British children's television producer and writer

- Occupations: Television producer, writer
- Known for: Alphablocks, Numberblocks
- Awards: BAFTA Children's Award (2019)

Joe Elliot is a British children's television producer and writer. He created the CBeebies preschool series Alphablocks (2010) and Numberblocks (2017), and co-created Colourblocks (2022) and Wonderblocks (2025). Numberblocks won the BAFTA Children's Award for Pre-School Animation in 2019, an award Elliot shared with Simon Taylor and Ben Lee-Delisle. He was also named as a nominee for Alphablocks in 2010 and for Numberblocks in 2017.

== Education ==
Elliot attended Clare College, Cambridge, matriculating in 1987.

== Career ==
Elliot has said that he worked as a primary school teacher before moving into publishing and then interactive media, designing learning games. In the mid-to-late 1990s he worked at Dorling Kindersley on the educational CD-ROMs I Love Maths (1996), I Love Spelling (1997) and I Love Science (1998).

By 2008 Elliot was Director of Learning and Children's Media at Magic Lantern Productions. He was listed as a member of the "Friends Group" of the Byron Review into children and digital technology, published in 2008, and served as a juror in the pre-school category of the Japan Prize in 2008.

=== Blocks series ===
Elliot created Alphablocks, a preschool series in which animated letters come to life and join together to form words, teaching early phonics. Its first series debuted on CBeebies in January 2010. Elliot is credited as an author on titles in the Bug Club Phonics — Alphablocks series of phonics readers published by Pearson Education from 2011.

Elliot also created Numberblocks, a companion series on early mathematics that debuted on CBeebies in January 2017. It was made in partnership with the National Centre for Excellence in the Teaching of Mathematics. Numberblocks is produced and owned by Alphablocks Ltd, a company Elliot co-founded, which was renamed Blocks Universe Ltd in 2026.

Elliot has written or co-written numerous episodes of both series.

Elliot is a co-creator of Colourblocks, which debuted in September 2022, and of Wonderblocks, which debuted in January 2025.

== Selected credits ==
Year	Title	Role
2010–present	Alphablocks	Creator, executive producer, writer
2017–present	Numberblocks	Creator, executive producer, writer
2022–present	Colourblocks	Co-creator, executive producer
2025–present	Wonderblocks	Co-creator

== Awards ==
Year	Award	Category	Work	Result
2010	BAFTA Children's Award	Learning – Primary	Alphablocks	Nominated
2017	BAFTA Children's Award	Learning	Numberblocks	Nominated
2019	BAFTA Children's Award	Pre-School Animation	Numberblocks	Won
