= It's Pony =

British animated television series

- Genre: Comedy
- Created by: Ant Blades
- Directed by: Ant Blades
- Voices of: Jessica DiCicco; Josh Zuckerman; Abe Benrubi; India de Beaufort
- Opening theme: "It's Pony!" by Jon Wygens
- Composer: Mike Rubino
- Country of origin: United Kingdom
- Original language: English
- No. of seasons: 2
- No. of episodes: 40 (78 segments)

Production
- Producers: Adam Shaw; Denise Green
- Editors: Alec Smith; Mel Dayalan
- Running time: 11 minutes (regular); 22 minutes (specials)
- Production companies: Blue Zoo Animation Studio; Nickelodeon Animation Studio

Original release
- Network: Nickelodeon
- Release: January 18 – December 5, 2020
- Network: Nicktoons
- Release: October 29, 2021 – May 26, 2022

It's Pony is a British animated television series created by Ant Blades that premiered on Nickelodeon in the United States on January 18, 2020. The series is storyboarded, designed, produced, and animated by Blue Zoo Animation Studio. The final episode aired on Nicktoons on May 26, 2022.

== Premise ==
It's Pony follows the life of Annie as she does her best to cope in her parents' farm (located on the balcony of their apartment) to the everyday struggles of being a 9-year-old in the city. Luckily, she has a pony. He may not be the best pony, but he is hers and she loves him. Pony adores her as well, but his optimism and enthusiasm often lead to the pair in unexpected and unwanted situations.

== Characters ==
=== Main ===
- Annie (voiced by Jessica DiCicco)
- Pony (voiced by Josh Zuckerman)
- Dad (voiced by Abe Benrubi)
- Mom (voiced by India de Beaufort)

=== Supporting ===
- Fred (voiced by Kal Penn)
- Brian (voiced by Bobby Moynihan)
- Ms. Ramiro (voiced by Rosario Dawson)
- Mr. Pancks (voiced by Mark Feuerstein)
- Beatrice (voiced by Megan Hilty)

== Production ==
The series originated from a short titled Pony, created as part of the annual Nickelodeon Animated Shorts Program. On March 6, 2018, it was announced that Nickelodeon officially green-lit the series with a 20-episode order at Nickelodeon's 2018 upfront presentation. On December 9, 2019, it was announced that the series would premiere on January 18, 2020, with a teaser episode released online on December 26, 2019.

On July 9, 2020, the series was renewed for a second season of 20 episodes, which premiered on October 29, 2021. On March 28, 2024, the series was removed from Paramount+ as part of a "strategic decision to focus on content with mass global appeal".

== Episodes ==
=== Series overview ===
Season	Segments	Episodes	Originally released		
Season	Segments	Episodes	First released	Last released	Network
1	35	18	January 18, 2020	December 5, 2020	Nickelodeon
2	43	22	October 29, 2021	May 26, 2022	Nicktoons

=== Season 1 (2020) ===
No. overall	No. in season	Title	Written by	Storyboard by	Original release date	Prod. code	U.S. viewers (millions)
1	1	"Nosy Pony"	Ant Blades, Magda Liolis and Bob Mittenthal	Francesca Adams & Catherine Salkeld	January 18, 2020	102	0.96
1	1	"Beatrice"	Ant Blades, Magda Liolis and Bob Mittenthal	Charlie Higson & Denzel De Meerleer	January 18, 2020	102	0.96
"Nosy Pony": In order to run the family's produce stand, Annie tries to get Pony to stop being nosy. "Beatrice": Annie lets Pony spend the day with her friend Beatrice, but worries that Beatrice is better at caring for Pony than herself.
2	2	"Unicorn"	Ant Blades, Magda Liolis and Bob Mittenthal	Charlie Higson & Dan Hamman	January 25, 2020 (Note: "Plants!" was released on the Nick App and Nick On Demand on December 25, 2019, releasing on YouTube the next day.)	103B	0.75
3	3	"Plants!"	Ant Blades, Magda Liolis and Bob Mittenthal	Francesca Adams & Denzel De Meerleer	January 25, 2020	101A	0.75
"Unicorn": When Pony thinks he is a unicorn, Annie uses him to with a school bake sale. "Plants!": Annie tries to cure Pony's fear of plants before her school's camping trip.
4	4	"Heston's Coat"	Ant Blades, Magda Liolis and Bob Mittenthal	Francesca Adams & Mohamed Skifati	February 1, 2020	101B	0.57
5	5	"Game Horse"	Ant Blades, Magda Liolis and Bob Mittenthal	Charlie Higson & Mohamed Skifati	February 1, 2020	103A	0.57
"Heston's Coat": Heston loans Annie his new coat on a cold day, and Annie keeps it away from Pony out of fear that he will ruin it. "Game Horse": Annie and Pony use their video game skills to save their friends.
6	6	"Horace"	Ant Blades, Magda Liolis and Bob Mittenthal	Francesca Adams & Denzel De Meerleer	February 8, 2020	104	0.75
6	6	"The Boot"	Ant Blades, Magda Liolis and Bob Mittenthal	Catherine Salkeld & Dominika Brodowska	February 8, 2020	104	0.75
"Horace": Annie can avoid detention if she can heal the principal's dying plant, but the plan goes awry when Pony becomes attached to it. "The Boot": Pony's half-baked plan causes Annie to lose one of her boots, which she needs for a family photo.
7	7	"Distractions"	Ant Blades & Tobi Wilson	Francesca Adams & Richard Tuft	February 15, 2020	105	0.42
7	7	"The Giving Chair"	Adam Cohen	Francesca Adams & Denzel De Meerleer	February 15, 2020	105	0.42
"Distractions": Pony keeps distracting Annie, causing her to have trouble working on her part of a science project Gerry is counting on her to do. "The Giving Chair": Annie goes with Pony to the bookstore to buy one of her dad's books, and they find a comfy chair that gives them whatever they want.
8	8	"Haircut"	Ant Blades, Magda Liolis and Bob Mittenthal	Dan Hamman & Hugh La Terriere	February 22, 2020	106	0.68
8	8	"Gerry's Birthday"	Ant Blades, Magda Liolis and Bob Mittenthal	Catherine Salkeld & Richard Tuft	February 22, 2020	106	0.68
9	9	"Pet Pony"	Ant Blades, Magda Liolis and Bob Mittenthal	Dan Hamman & Dominika Brodowska	February 29, 2020	107	0.60
9	9	"Dog Day"	Ant Blades, Magda Liolis and Bob Mittenthal	Catherine Salkeld & Richard Tuft	February 29, 2020	107	0.60
10	10	"Useful"	Ant Blades & Tobi Wilson	Dan Hamman & Denzel De Meerleer	March 7, 2020	108	0.70
10	10	"Stompy!"	Ant Blades, Magda Liolis and Bob Mittenthal	Francesca Adams & Dominika Brodowska	March 7, 2020	108	0.70
11	11	"Delivery Pony"	Ant Blades, Magda Liolis and Bob Mittenthal	Catherine Salkeld, Richard Tuft and Graeme Young	March 14, 2020	109	0.54
11	11	"Magic Annie"	Ant Blades, Magda Liolis and Bob Mittenthal	Francesca Adams & Denzel De Meerleer	March 14, 2020	109	0.54
12	12	"Bad Chicken"	Ant Blades, Magda Liolis and Bob Mittenthal	Dan Hamman & Richard Tuft	June 1, 2020	110A	0.45
13	13	"Gerry's Tour"	Ant Blades, Magda Liolis and Bob Mittenthal	Catherine Salkeld, Denzel De Meerleer and Gray Young	June 2, 2020	110B	0.36
14	14	"10 Minute Ticket"	Story by : Charlie Higson; Written by : Ant Blades, Magda Liolis and Bob Mittenthal	Hugh La Terriere & Dominika Brodowska	June 3, 2020	111A	0.46
15	15	"Clara Time"	Ant Blades, Magda Liolis and Bob Mittenthal	Dan Hamman & Richard Tuft	June 4, 2020	111B	0.41
16	16	"Loud Horse"	Ant Blades, Magda Liolis and Bob Mittenthal	Graeme Young & Dominika Brodowska	August 24, 2020	113A	0.53
17	17	"Sick Annie"	Ant Blades, Adam Jeffrey Cohen, Magda Liolis and Bob Mittenthal	Dan Hamman & Dominika Brodowska	August 25, 2020	113B	0.50
18	18	"School Dance"	Ant Blades, Magda Liolis and Bob Mittenthal	Graeme Young & Prawta Annez	August 26, 2020	114A	0.51
19	19	"Dad's Speech"	Ant Blades, Magda Liolis and Bob Mittenthal	Hugh La Terrier & Denzel De Meerleer	August 27, 2020	114B	0.54
20	20	"Scarecrow"	Alex Collier	Hugh La Terrier & Denzel De Meerleer	October 23, 2020	112	0.44
20	20	"Poneapples"	Ant Blades, Adam Jeffrey Cohen, Magda Liolis and Bob Mittenthal	Graeme Young & Richard Tuft	October 23, 2020	112	0.44
"Scarecrow": Pony hits a scarecrow, which causes crows to infest the pumpkins and the house. "Poneapples": After Dad tells Annie and Pony to wash the apples to sell to the public, but Pony instead chooses to wash the apples using his mouth, causing Annie to get more money for her cards.
21	21	"Fan Pony"	Ant Blades, Magda Liolis and Bob Mittenthal	Dan Hamman, Charlie Higson and Denzel De Meerleer	November 7, 2020	120	0.48
21	21	"Cop Mom"	Ant Blades, Charlie Higson, Magda Liolis and Bob Mittenthal	Hugh La Terriere & Prawta Annez	November 7, 2020	120	0.48
22	22	"Annie-versary"	Adam Long	Hugh La Terriere & Denzel De Meerleer	November 14, 2020	115	0.54
22	22	"Teacher's Pet"	Alex Collier	Dan Hamman, Prawta Annez and Richard Tuft	November 14, 2020	115	0.54
23	23	"Trash Dash"	Shane Langan & Amy Stephenson	Dan Hamman & Prawta Annez	November 21, 2020	117	0.53
23	23	"Save the Took Took"	Alex Collier	Dan Hamman, Denzel De Meerleer and Prawta Annez	November 21, 2020	117	0.53
24	24	"Bramley Holiday"	Ant Blades, Magda Liolis and Bob Mittenthal	Graeme Young, Hugh La Terriere, Richard Tuft, and Denzel De Meerleer	December 5, 2020	116	0.55

=== Season 2 (2021–22) ===
No. overall	No. in season	Title	Written by	Storyboard by	Original release date	Prod. code	U.S. viewers (millions)
25	1	"Raiders of the Lost Cinema"	Ant Blades, Magda Liolis and Bob Mittenthal	Hugh La Terriere & Richard Tuft	October 29, 2021	209	0.02
26	2	"Annie's Voice"	Sara E.B. Osman	Jessica Tóth	December 9, 2021	211	0.04
26	2	"Business as Usual"	Ta'riq Fisher, Ant Blades, Magda Liolis and Bob Mittenthal	Kati Knitt	December 9, 2021	211	0.04
27	3	"The Wallet"	Ant Blades, Magda Liolis and Bob Mittenthal	Graeme Young, Prawta Annez and Richard Tuft	January 17, 2022	118	0.11
27	3	"Locked Out"	Alex Collier	Hugh La Terriere & Prawta Annez	January 17, 2022	118	0.11
28	4	"Always Yes Annie"	Ant Blades, Magda Liolis and Bob Mittenthal	Graeme Young & Denzel De Meerleer	January 20, 2022	119	0.05
28	4	"Sleepover"	Ant Blades, Charlie Higson, Magda Liolis and Bob Mittenthal	Dan Hamman, Hugh La Terriere and Richard Tuft	January 20, 2022	119	0.05
29	5	"Flight of the Chickens"	Charlie Higson	Graeme Young	January 27, 2022	201	N/A
29	5	"Henrietta the Psychic"	Howard Read	Hugh La Terriere	January 27, 2022	201	N/A
30	6	"Annie vs. Pony"	Isabel Fay, Bob Mittenthal and Magda Liolis	Dave Dekeyser	February 3, 2022	203	0.09
30	6	"Get Sapphire"	Derek Miller, Bob Mittenthal and Magda Liolis	David Stoten	February 3, 2022	203	0.09
31	7	"Pighog Day"	Alex Collier, Magda Liolis, Ant Blades and Bob Mittenthal	Jamie Iles	February 10, 2022	202	0.06
31	7	"Second Best Friend"	Howard Read, Magda Liolis, Ant Blades and Bob Mittenthal	Gray Young & Hugh La Terriere	February 10, 2022	202	0.06
32	8	"Pony Car"	Alex Collier, Bob Mittenthal and Magda Liolis	Dave Dekeyser	February 17, 2022	204	0.05
32	8	"Wedding Planners"	Adam Cohen, Bob Mittenthal and Magda Liolis	Jamie Iles	February 17, 2022	204	0.05
33	9	"Cat Alley"	Magda Liolis & Bob Mittenthal	Kati Knitt	February 24, 2022	205	0.03
33	9	"Saving Horse"	Ant Blades, Magda Liolis and Bob Mittenthal	David Stoten & Jessica Tóth	February 24, 2022	205	0.03
34	10	"Comic Connival"	Derek Miller, Magda Liolis, Ant Blades and Bob Mittenthal	Jessica Tóth	March 3, 2022	207	0.08
34	10	"Horse on a Hot Tin Roof"	Howard Read, Magda Liolis, Ant Blades and Bob Mittenthal	Jamie Iles	March 3, 2022	207	0.08
35	11	"Song of the Soil"	Giles Pilbrow	Dave Dekeyser	March 10, 2022	208	N/A
35	11	"Street Smart"	Charlie Higson	Kati Knitt	March 10, 2022	208	N/A
36	12	"Ponopoly"	Giles Pilbrow	Dave Dekeyser	March 17, 2022	210	0.09
36	12	"President Annie"	Stephanie Kemp, Magda Liolis, Ant Blades and Bob Mittenthal	Jamie Iles	March 17, 2022	210	0.09
37	13	"Cow Power"	James Huntrods	Richard Tuft	March 24, 2022	212	0.06
37	13	"I.T. Pony"	Alex Collier	Hugh La Terriere & Adelia Ardovino	March 24, 2022	212	0.06
38	14	"Family Free for All"	Howard Read, Magda Liolis, Ant Blades and Bob Mittenthal	Kati Knitt	March 31, 2022	213	0.05
38	14	"Lucky Pony"	Angel Hobbs	Jamie Iles	March 31, 2022	213	0.05
39	15	"City Pony"	Derek Miller, Magda Liolis, Ant Blades and Bob Mittenthal	Dave Dekeyser & Jessica Tóth	April 7, 2022	214	0.07
39	15	"Country Pony"	Derek Miller, Magda Liolis, Ant Blades and Bob Mittenthal	Dave Dekeyser & Jessica Tóth	April 7, 2022	214	0.07
40	16	"Hot Tub Brine Machine"	Magda Liolis & Bob Mittenthal	Hugh La Terriere	April 14, 2022	215	0.06
40	16	"The Secret Life of Pony"	Magda Liolis & Bob Mittenthal	Jamie Iles	April 14, 2022	215	0.06
41	17	"Space Shippers"	Magda Liolis & Bob Mittenthal	Jessica Tóth	April 21, 2022	217	0.05
41	17	"The Lakey Loos"	Lucas Mills	Hugh La Terriere	April 21, 2022	217	0.05
42	18	"Bowled Over"	Alex Collier	Dave Dekeyser	April 28, 2022	218	0.06
42	18	"Disaster Express"	Bryce Marrero	Kati Knitt	April 28, 2022	218	0.06
43	19	"Pony Almighty"	Ant Blades, Magda Liolis and Bob Mittenthal	Richard Tuft	May 5, 2022	219	0.04
43	19	"Annie the Influencer"	Ayana Reece	Jamie Iles	May 5, 2022	219	0.04
44	20	"Never Take Advice From a Pony"	Ant Blades, Magda Liolis and Bob Mittenthal	Richard Tuft	May 12, 2022	216	0.04
44	20	"Moon Face-Off"	Howard Read	Jessica Tóth	May 12, 2022	216	0.04
45	21	"Pony, Come Home"	Magda Liolis & Bob Mittenthal	Kati Knitt & Dave Dekeyser	May 19, 2022	220	0.03
45	21	"Special Sauce"	Ant Blades, Magda Liolis and Bob Mittenthal	Dave Dekeyser	May 19, 2022	220	0.03
46	22	"Beachy Weachy Weach"	Ant Blades, Magda Liolis and Bob Mittenthal	Richard Tuft	May 26, 2022	206	0.04
46	22	"Bee in a Jar"	Alex Collier, Ant Blades, Magda Liolis and Bob Mittenthal	Hugh La Terriere & Adelia Ardovino	May 26, 2022	206	0.04

=== Shorts ===
No.	Title	Original release date	Prod. code	U.S. viewers (millions)
Nickelodeon
1	"Coffee Run"	May 28, 2021	101	0.29
1	"Paper Chase"	May 28, 2021	101	0.29
"Coffee Run": When George and Helen run out of morning coffee, Annie and Pony quest off to get them some. "Paper Chase": After Annie forgets her homework, Pony chases after her to return it.
2	"Hold My Spot"	June 4, 2021	102	0.26
2	"Screen Time"	June 4, 2021	102	0.26
"Hold My Spot": Annie asks Pony to hold her spot when she has to go to the bathroom from drinking too much juice. However, Pony takes it to extremes as he waits. "Screen Time": Annie and her friends attempt to do their homework together online, but Pony is fooling around in the background.
Nicktoons
3	"Vending Machine"	March 17, 2022	117	0.09
3	"Inside Pony"	March 17, 2022	117	0.09

== Reception ==
=== Critical response ===
Emily Ashby gave the series a 4 out of 5 stars, stating that "the show plays on the absurd for laughs, but it's mostly well done and does entertain."

=== Ratings ===
Viewership and ratings per season of It's Pony
Season	Episodes	First aired		Last aired		Avg. viewers (millions)
Season	Episodes	Date	Viewers (millions)	Date	Viewers (millions)	Avg. viewers (millions)
1	24	January 18, 2020	0.96	December 5, 2020	0.55	0.57
2	20	October 29, 2021	0.02	May 26, 2022	0.04	0.06

=== Awards and nominations ===
Year	Award	Category	Recipient	Result	Ref.
2021	Annie Awards	Best Voice Acting – TV/Media	Jessica DiCicco (Annie)	Nominated	
2022	Kidscreen Awards	Best Short Film	"Coffee Run"	Won	
2023	Kidscreen Awards	Best Animated Series	It's Pony	Nominated	
