= Pragmata =

2026 video game

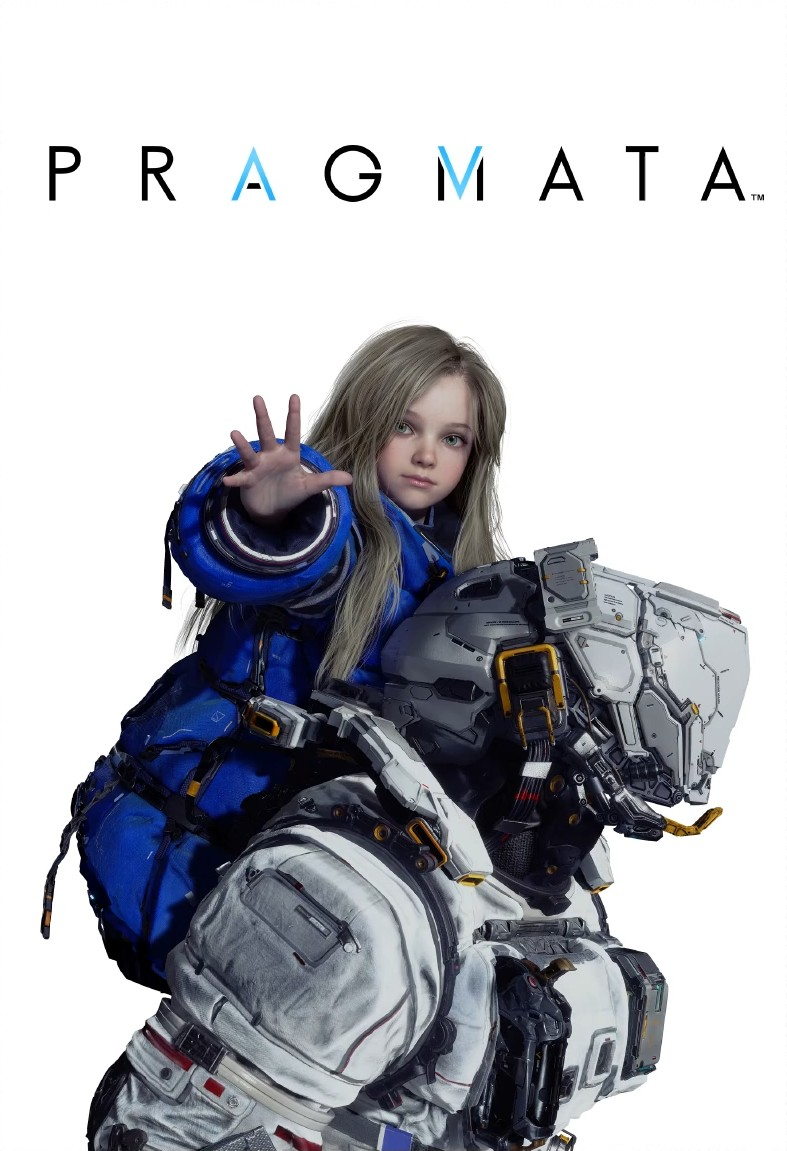
- Developer: Capcom
- Publisher: Capcom
- Directors: Cho Yong-hee; Yasuhiro Anpo
- Producers: Naoto Oyama; Edvin Edsö; Masachika Kawata
- Designer: Kohei Ozaki
- Programmers: Akihito Nakama; Yuto Nakagawa
- Artist: Hajime Kimura
- Writer: Haruo Murata
- Composer: Yasumasa Kitagawa
- Engine: RE Engine
- Platforms: Nintendo Switch 2; PlayStation 5; Windows; Xbox Series X/S
- Release: PlayStation 5, Windows, Xbox Series X/S: WW: April 17, 2026; Nintendo Switch 2: WW: April 17, 2026; JP: April 24, 2026
- Genre: Action-adventure
- Mode: Single-player

Pragmata (Note: Japanese: プラグマタ, Hepburn: Puragumata) is a 2026 action-adventure game developed and published by Capcom. It was released for PlayStation 5, Windows, Xbox Series X/S, and Nintendo Switch 2 on April 17, 2026. Set on a lunar research station, the game follows spacefarer Hugh Williams and an android named Diana as they attempt to escape from the hostile artificial intelligence IDUS and return to the Earth together.

The game received generally favorable reviews and sold more than two million units within 16 days of release.

== Gameplay ==
In Pragmata, players must first use Diana's ability to hack enemies before Hugh can shoot them.

Pragmata is an action-adventure played from a third-person perspective. The player can control Hugh and Diana at the same time, as they look for a way to escape a crumbling lunar research station while fighting off hostile robots controlled by a malevolent AI. Hugh wields a variety of energy and electricity-based weapons and can utilize a hip-mounted jetpack to dodge attacks and reach distant areas.

As most robots have metal plating that makes bullets ineffective, Diana must use her hacking ability to open weak points that Hugh can shoot. In each hacking puzzle, the player must guide the cursor across the grid to reach the target tile, evading obstacles and toggling optional bonus nodes which may bring additional combat advantages such as increased weapon damage for Hugh. The puzzles are solved in real time, meaning that Hugh needs to dodge and evade hostile attacks during each hacking sequence.

Defeated robots leave behind "lunafilament", a material needed for Hugh to both create new weapons and gear and upgrade his and Diana's capabilities. Upgrade nodes can also be found and used to increase health, attack, and hacking levels. Hugh is also encouraged to recover "REM" data, which enables him to present Diana with special gifts that strengthen the emotional bond between them.

== Plot ==
=== Setting ===
In the near future, the Delphi Corporation revolutionizes manufacturing with the invention of the "lim replicator", which can 3D print anything the user desires as long as they have a suitable blueprint. Lim replicators require a special material called lunafilament to function; to obtain a steady supply, a mining outpost called the Cradle is established on the Moon. To streamline operations, the Cradle is nominally overseen by an artificial intelligence called the Intelligent Direction Unification System (IDUS) and a massive robotic workforce.

=== Synopsis ===
Delphi Corporation systems engineer Hugh Williams is sent with a support team to investigate why communications between Earth and the Cradle have been cut off. However, when they land, they find the facility mysteriously devoid of human activity. The Cradle is then struck by a sudden moonquake, separating Hugh from his team and knocking him unconscious. He is revived by a child-like android girl, Pragmata D-I-0336-7, whom Hugh dubs Diana. He quickly discovers that the Cradle's AI administrator, IDUS, has gone rogue, and it begins sending hostile robots to eliminate him. Diana assists Hugh in combat by using her abilities to hack enemy robots, making them vulnerable to Hugh's weapons. However, she has no knowledge of why IDUS went rogue or what happened to the Cradle's human staff.

Hugh decides to let Diana accompany him as he attempts to reach the Comm Tower to send a distress signal to Earth. As they fight their way through the Cradle's various facilities, Hugh begins to find himself bonding with Diana as if she were a real child. Upon reaching the Comm Tower, Hugh is dismayed to discover IDUS has already locked down all communications, but they are contacted by a girl named Eight, who tells them she is trapped in the Terra Dome sector. With Diana's insistence, Hugh decides to go help Eight. Fighting their way through the Terra Dome, Hugh and Diana finally meet Eight, who is also a Pragmata. Eight explains that IDUS went rogue after the moonquake hit, and as a Pragmata, Diana can shut down IDUS if she can issue its stop code at its mainframe. Detecting their presence, IDUS attempts to lock down the area. Hugh and Diana are forced to leave Eight behind, but not before Eight transfers IDUS' shutdown code to Diana.

Hugh and Diana continue on to the mainframe, but on the way encounter a byproduct of lunafilament called "dead filament" which is toxic to organic life. They finally reach the mainframe and shut down IDUS, only to find out IDUS was attempting to contain Eight, who plans to transport vast amounts of dead filament to contaminate Earth. Eight then attacks Hugh, with Diana getting severely damaged in the process of protecting him. Hugh rushes Diana to the Pragmatics sector, where he gets her partially repaired. There, they learn that one of the Cradle's lead scientists, Dr. Neil Higgins, created the Pragmata as test subjects to find a cure for his daughter Daisy's rare illness. Diana was considered a failure as her ability to expunge dead filament from her body prevented accurate testing, while Eight was designed to collect the dead filament. Hugh manages to fully repair Diana, which also restores her ability to purge dead filament. However, Hugh himself is infected with the dead filament, which he hides from Diana.

The pair then head to the Cradle's Central Port to put a stop to Eight's plans, and they learn Dr. Higgins had died from a combination of despair and dead filament contamination after learning Daisy died in a failed medical procedure. As a result, Eight directed IDUS to kill the Cradle staff so she can send the dead filament to Earth, believing this would fulfil Dr. Higgins' last wish to warn Earth about lunafilament's dangers. Hugh and Diana then battle Eight and defeat her. As she dissolves, Eight pleads with Diana to tell Earth about what happened to Dr. Higgins. However, as the pair look for a shuttle, they are attacked by the combined amalgamation of dead filament, which has mutated into a massive monster. Hugh and Diana are able to destroy it using a pair of powerful cannons. Now dying from the dead filament, Hugh decides to stay behind on the Moon and gives up his own suit's battery to power a cargo shuttle to send Diana to Earth.

The post-credits scene reveals Diana safely landed on Earth, and fulfilled her dream of seeing a real tropical beach. She then looks up at the Moon and declares "I'm ready."

After completing the post-game "Unknown Signal" challenges, the player receives an item that unlocks an additional scene at the end of the game suggesting that Hugh survived his dead filament infection and was retrieved by Cabin, a friendly robot who helped Hugh and Diana.

== Development ==
Development on Pragmata took place over the course of six years at Capcom. The game was originally announced on June 11, 2020, during Sony's PlayStation 5 reveal stream, as Capcom's first original franchise in eight years. Based on Capcom's 2021 annual report, Brian Ashcraft of Kotaku wrote, "One reason why the game looks so different from other Capcom titles is that it's the brainchild of new development staff". After its 2020 reveal, Pragmata spent time in development hell and was delayed indefinitely. Director Cho Yonghee said that, although the game's core concept didn't change during development, the team had engaged in extensive trial and error, particularly around the game's puzzle hacking. World building was supervised by Shōji Kawamori, who worked on the Macross series.

=== Design ===
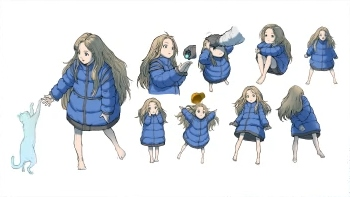
Diana concept art

Developer Capcom struggled with creating Diana's visual design, originally wanting Diana to look like a full android. Creating a fully android character, however, brings challenges in character expression. Director Cho Yonghee cited Arale Norimaki from Dr. Slump as an android character with "cartoonish expressions", such as screwing her head off her body, that they could not recreate. As they had to contend with certain restrictions such as cultural aspects and sensitivities for the game's worldwide release, Capcom decided to translate Diana's roboticism into something more understated. Diana visually appears human but some of her machine-like mannerisms and voice venture into the uncanny valley. Compared to past Capcom projects, Diana's model was created entirely from scratch by newcomers to the company rather than using 3D scanning technology, with her animations also foregoing child actors in favor of Capcom staff themselves.

Pragmata's New York City-like level was designed to look like it was created with generative AI, appearing as "slightly distorted" according to producer Naoto Oyama with illogical errors such as taxis sinking into floors or buses sprouting out of walls. Generative AI was not used to create this look as Capcom's "human developers painstakingly worked to incorporate mechanisms that express this AI-like uncanny feel". Elie Gould of PC Gamer called this art direction "human-made AI slop". However, Capcom had to consider balancing distortions in the environment to not be too distracting or to not be mistaken for puzzle clues by players.

=== Casting ===
David Menkin was cast as the English voice of Hugh Williams in 2024, spending around 18 months voicing the character. Menkin said he refrained from posting on social media about NASA's Artemis II lunar flyby mission for fear that he was breaking his NDA and could not acknowledge his role until Pragmata released. Grace Saif is the English voice for Diana. After the actors had been cast, they were brought in for a table read, which is uncommon for video games, for early cutscenes such as Hugh naming Diana. Menkin and Saif never worked together as Hugh and Diana. Menkin recorded his lines first with Saif working off them in her own recording sessions.

=== Technology ===
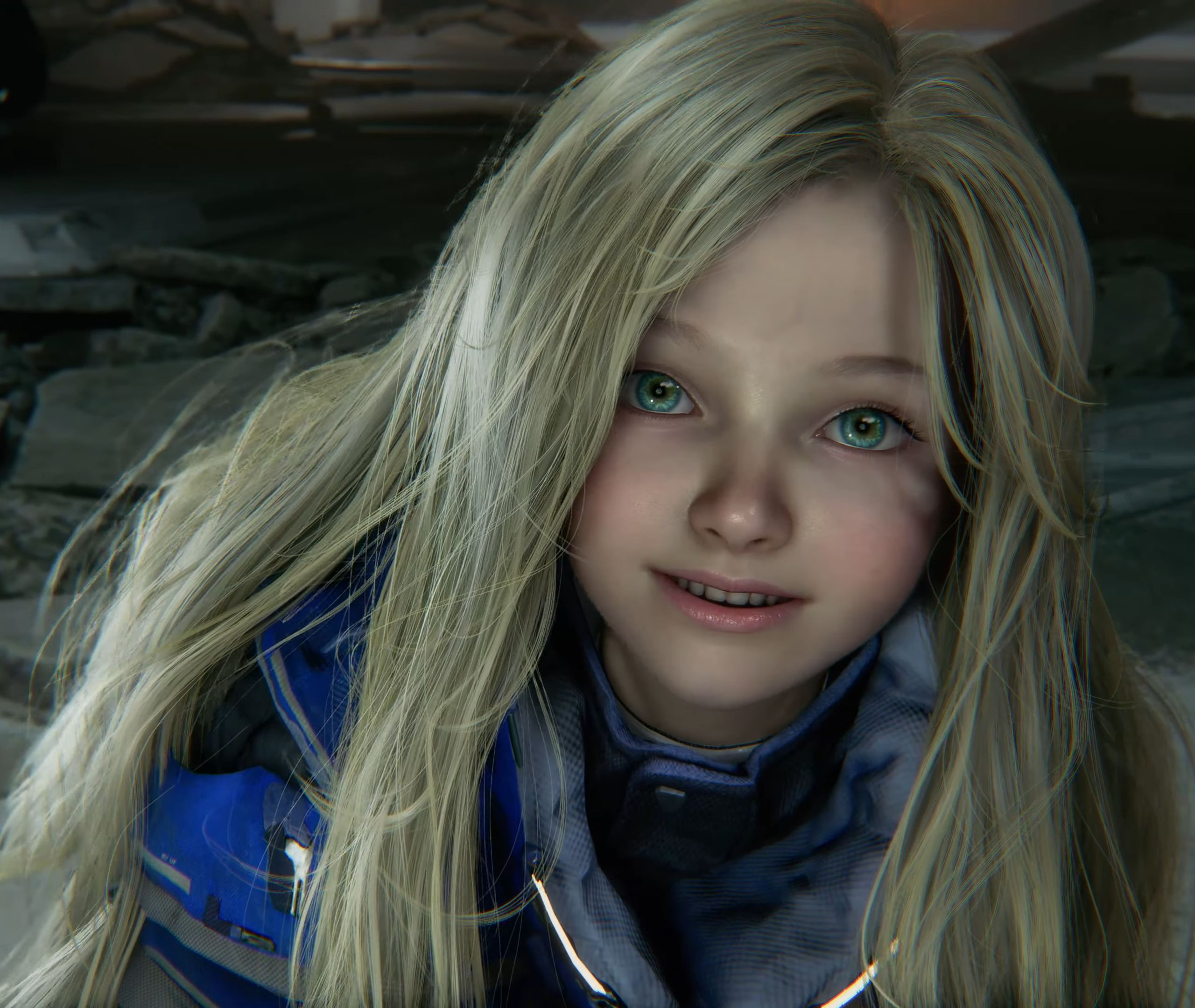
To ensure Diana's hair looked realistic, it was rendered with RE Engine's physics-based hair simulation system.

Pragmata was developed in Capcom's RE Engine. It supports ray traced global illumination for indirect lighting and ray traced reflections. On PC, the game supports path tracing to enable multi-bounce lighting and higher quality ray traced reflections. Engine development support manager Masaru Ijuin said that path tracing "fundamentally transforms game visuals" with it enabling "cinematic quality visuals" in Pragmata "reminiscent of high-end sci-fi films". Capcom spent 18 months working with Nvidia on implementing path tracing in Pragmata. Shader Execution Reordering (SER), first introduced with Nvidia GeForce RTX 40 series GPUs, is utilized for Pragmata's path tracing to save frame time. The initial SER addition without compaction increased frame time to 23.5ms which was reduced to 16.9ms and later 13.3ms through respective optimizations on the engine and driver side. Nvidia recommends SER for future path traced titles as SER was added to DirectX Raytracing (DXR) 1.2. ReSTIR Global Illumination is used to reduce noise from indirect lighting as Capcom found that denoising using DLSS Ray Reconstruction produced ghosting artifacts. Scenes in Pragmata could be lit entirely with image-based lighting (IBL) which reduced noise. Accurately lighting RE Engine's strand-based hair in Pragmata with path tracing was a challenge. Diana's long hair diverged too far from the regular proxy mesh used as a fallback in the ray tracing bounding volume hierarchy (BVH). Full strand geometry, on the other hand, is included in the BVH for path tracing. Path tracing enables sharper, more stable reflections that are physically accurate in Pragmata's highly reflective environments such as its lunar base. Path tracing is only available on Nvidia GPUs due to forcing DLSS Ray Reconstruction without a fallback to another denoiser.

For hair rendering, Pragmata uses RE Engine's strand hair system which first appeared on shorter hair in titles such as Resident Evil 4 (2023). RE Engine's hair strand system is a physics-based hair simulation system that aims to make hair look more natural and realistic compared to the traditional rasterized hair cards technique. Further development on the hair strand system to better simulate long hair was prompted by Diana's long hair in Pragmata that needed to accurately move. The team working on the game had to ask the RE Engine development team to make such additions to the engine's hair system. This work on Diana's hair rendering in Pragmata was later transferred to Resident Evil Requiem for Grace Ashcroft's hair.

PlayStation 5 and Xbox Series X feature frame-rate and resolution graphical modes, both of which are rendered at a 1080p internal resolution with FSR 1 spatial upscaling to a 4K output. They both target 60 frames per second but the frame-rate mode holds closer to that target. The two modes are primarily differentiated with graphics features. The resolution mode features ray traced global illumination and ray traced reflections and higher quality hair strands. The frame-rate mode replaces ray traced reflections with screen-space reflections. Pragmata is enhanced on PlayStation 5 Pro with the same 60 frames per second target. Upon release, the game was originally rendered at a lower 864p resolution compared to PlayStation 5 but Patch 1.21 increased the internal resolution to 1080p, matching that of the base console. The increased internal resolution on PlayStation 5 Pro rectified issues with ray traced reflections being lower resolution than the base PlayStation 5. Pragmata is upscaled using PlayStation Spectral Super Resolution (PSSR) rather than FSR 1 to a 4K output. An unlocked frame rate mode is exlusive to PlayStation 5 Pro when the console is connected to a 120Hz VRR display. Maintaining ray tracing and hair strands, it uses an 864p internal resolution but is instead upscaled with PSSR to a 1440p output. Xbox Series S has just one mode which does not include ray tracing or hair strands. Series S is rendered at a native 720p resolution upscaled to 1440p with FSR 1.

The Switch 2 version in docked mode runs at 540p upscaled using DLSS to a 1080p output resolution. In handheld mode, Pragmata is rendered at 360p internally with a 3× upscale to a 1080p output. The game's frame rate is unlocked in Switch 2 with it fluctuating from 30 to 60 frames per second depending on the scene. Among the cutbacks, ambient occlusion is excluded altogether on Switch 2 with lower global illumination quality giving darker indirect lighting. Geometry quality is reduced and strand-based hair is replaced by traditional hair cards.

== Release ==
Initially, Pragmata was announced for 2022, however in January 2021, Capcom announced that the game was delayed to 2023. In June 2023, Capcom released a trailer stating that the game had been delayed indefinitely. In the June 2025 installment of State of Play, Capcom announced that the game would be coming out in 2026.

At The Game Awards 2025, it was announced that the game would release on April 24, 2026 and a demo titled Pragmata: Sketchbook was made available on Steam. It was also announced that the game would be coming to the Nintendo Switch 2 and it would also get an Amiibo based on Diana, which grants the player additional weapons and recovery items when scanned. The demo was released on consoles on February 5, 2026. On March 5, it was announced during a Capcom Spotlight presentation that the release date had been brought forward a week to April 17, though the Nintendo Switch 2 version would retain the original April 24 release date in Japan.

== Reception ==
=== Critical reception ===
Reception

Aggregate scores
Aggregator	Score
Metacritic	(NS2) 89/100 (PC) 88/100 (PS5) 85/100 (XSXS) 87/100
OpenCritic	96% recommend

Review scores
Publication	Score
Destructoid	9.5/10
Eurogamer	4/5
Game Informer	8/10
GameSpot	9/10
GamesRadar+	4/5
Giant Bomb	4.5/5
Hardcore Gamer	4/5
IGN	8/10
Nintendo Life	9/10
Nintendo World Report	9/10
PC Gamer (US)	87/100
Push Square	8/10
RPGamer	4.5/5
Shacknews	9/10
TechRadar	4/5
The Guardian	4/5
Video Games Chronicle	4/5

Pragmata received "generally favorable" reviews, according to review aggregator website Metacritic, with 96% of critics recommending the game on OpenCritic.

Pragmata received praise for its story and the relationship between protagonists Hugh and Diana. Tom Regan in The Guardian's four star review called Pragmata a "beautifully made, heartfelt single player adventure" that is able to pull off "its father-daughter relationship with surprising deftness". In a review for Hardcore Gamer, Adam Beck called it "a heartfelt experience not only about the human experience, but also parenthood". He called Diana the "heart" of Pragmata while criticizing Hugh for not having a significant character arc throughout the game. Giant Bomb commended Diana for not being an annoying or obnoxious companion, despite being a talkative child, as she is able to give useful information to the player. TechRadar's Rob Dwair highlighted Pragmata's depiction of AI as feeling timely.

IGN's Michael Higham saw Pragmata as being a game "straight from the Xbox 360 era" with its primary focus on creative gameplay mechanics over storytelling. The hacking mechanic requires balancing solving puzzles quickly while paying attention to and dodging enemy attacks. This multi-faceted system recalled Dead Space for Steve Watts of GameSpot, imbuing the game's combat with a sense of tension. Likewise, Dom Peppiatt of Eurogamer cited other third-person titles from the Xbox 360 generation like Watch Dogs, Vanquish, Lost Planet, Gears of War, and Dead Rising, writing that Pragmata "manages to feel so derivative and so original at the same time". He argued that the game's action "carries a very mediocre story with ease". Rob Dwair of TechRadar criticized the game's pacing in the latter half with its increasingly constrained areas that lock the player into multi-enemy battles. Jasmine Gould-Wilson, in a review for GamesRadar+, criticized the collectibles system as being difficult to navigate due to a lack of a minimap. Scanning for objectives adds visual noise as nearby collectibles clutter the HUD rather than being shown on the larger blueprint map.

=== Sales ===
Pragmata sold over 1 million copies worldwide within two days of release, and surpassed 2 million copies within 16 days. It was the second best-selling video game in April 2026 in the United States. By July 2026, Pragmata had sold over 2.5 million copies worldwide. By September 30, 2026, it had sold over 2.7 million copies worldwide.

=== Awards ===
Year	Award	Category	Result	Ref.
2026	Golden Joystick Awards	Ultimate Game of the Year	Nominated	
2026	Golden Joystick Awards	Best Supporting Performer (Grace Saif)	Won	
2026	Golden Joystick Awards	Console Game of the Year	Nominated	
2026	The Game Awards 2026	Best Game Direction	Pending	
2026	The Game Awards 2026	Best Action/Adventure Game	Pending	
