= Beyond the Gravy =

British radio programme, 2004

- Running time: 35 minutes
- Country of origin: United Kingdom
- Language: English
- Home station: BBC Radio 4
- Starring: David Bradley; Elizabeth Spriggs; David Holt
- Original release: October 2004 – October 2004
- No. of episodes: 4

Beyond the Gravy is a short-lived radio programme that aired in October 2004. There were four 35-minute episodes and it was broadcast on BBC Radio 4. It starred David Bradley, Elizabeth Spriggs, and David Holt.

== Notes and references ==
Lavalie, John. Beyond the Gravy. EpGuides. 21 Jul 2005. 29 Jul 2005. On epguides.com
