= David Holt (voice actor) =

British voice actor

- Occupations: Voice actor; writer
- Years active: 1993–present
- Website: www.david-holt.co.uk

David Holt is an English voice actor and writer. He has contributed his voice to a wide variety of children's cartoons.

== Career ==
=== Voice acting ===
Holt is noted for his role as Vervain in Watership Down as well as the voices for the male animals in Percy the Park Keeper, Oakie Doke and other voices in Oakie Doke, Cowboy, Policeman, farm animals, and Robin Hood in A Town Called Panic, Dad in Angry Kid and Pinky in The Pinky and Perky Show. He has also done other voice work in animation, promos, documentaries, films, television, multi-media, computer games, children's toys, exhibition guides, announcements and audio books. He also has voiced commercials for L'Oreal Kids, Guess Who? and Burger King. He had provided the voice to the UK version of Face from Nick Jr. from 1995 until September 2005, and Moose A. Moose from 2006 to 2010 for Noggin on TMF/VIVA and 2010 to 2013 for Nick Jr. He played the voice of Jack Frost in the film Rainbow Magic: Return to Rainspell Island.

=== Writing ===
In his writing career, he has been writing for various radio or television productions like In the Name of the Wee Man, Cold Call, Tales From The Tower, Proof of the Pudding, Medium Rare and Beyond the Gravy.

== Filmography ==
=== Film ===
Year	Title	Role	Notes
1993	We're Back! A Dinosaur's Story	Additional voices	
1996	Achilles	Additional voices	
1997	Annabelle's Wish	Narrator	UK dub
1998	Gilbert & Sullivan: The Very Models	Richard D'Oyly Carte	
2008	A Fox's Tale	Doofus – Knuckles	English version
2009	Professor Layton and the Eternal Diva	Marco Brock	English version
2010	Rainbow Magic: Return to Rainspell Island	Jack Frost	
2011	Isle of Spagg	Inger; Doctor Beez	Short
2012	The Happy Wanderer	Maitre D	Short
2013	The Jungle Book: Return 2 the Jungle	Shere Khan	Direct-to-video
2019	A Shaun the Sheep Movie: Farmageddon	Mugg-1N5	

=== Television ===
Year	Title	Role	Notes
1994	Shakespeare: The Animated Tales	Hymen, Silvius	Episode: "As You Like It"
1995	Oakie Doke	Oakie Doke, Male voices	All Episodes
1996	Testament: The Bible in Animation	Captain	Episode: "Creation and the Flood"
1996	The Adventures of the Garden Fairies	All voices	
1996–1999	Percy the Park Keeper	Male animals	
1997	Brambly Hedge	Teasel Toadflax, Additional voices	Episode: "Spring Story"
1997	Soul Music	Mr. Clete, Additional voices	
1997	Enid Blyton's The Magic Faraway Tree	Angry Pixie, Additional voices	
1998	Wyrd Sisters	Additional voices	
1998–2002, 2019	Angry Kid	Dad, Lil’ Sis, Speccy	
1999	Little Monsters	Fathers, Additional male characters	
1999	Lavender Castle	Captain Thrice, Sproggle, Additional voices	
1999-2000	Pablo the Little Red Fox	Pablo	Main role
1999–2001	Watership Down	Vervain, Bluesky, Boxwood, Darkling	
2000	A Town Called Panic	Cowboy, Policeman, Farm animals, Robin Hood, Additional voices	
2000	Sheeep	Hubert, Gotcha, Spike, Captain Bleat, P.C. Butt, Duncan Shears	
2000	The Magic Key	Floppy	
2000	Fetch the Vet	George Moffat, Violet Blush, Lionel Froggatt	
2001	The Wheels on the Bus	Beep and male characters	
2002–2004	Engie Benjy	Farmer Fred, Fisherman Finn	
2003	The Day Britain Stopped	Dominic Steel (Safety Compliance Manager, Heathrow)	Mockumentary
2005	Muffin the Mule	Muffin, Willie, Morris	All episodes
2006	Rudi and Trudi	Rudi	English version
2006	Pulling	Bingo Caller	Episode #1.1
2006	The Likeaballs	Laughaball	
2006–2007	The Magic Roundabout	Dougal, Brian	Main role
2008–2009	The Pinky and Perky Show	Pinky, Additional voices	Main role
2010	The Jungle Book	Shere Khan	
2010–2025	Alphablocks	Various male characters	
2011	Quiff and Boot	Gene; The Hundred	TV movie
2016	Tree Fu Tom	Zigzoo, Chezz, and Muru	Season 5
2017–present	Numberblocks	Seven, Nine, Fourteen, Seventeen, Twenty-Two, Twenty-Six, Thirty-One, Thirty-Five, Thirty-Six, Seventy, Ninety, Nine Hundred, Seven Thousand and Ninety Thousand	
2019	Yes We Can	Sam McBratney book - Narrator	
2019–2020	YooHoo to the Rescue	Lemmee	UK dub
2020	The Hundred Decker Bus	Mike Smith book - Narrator	

=== Video games ===
Year	Title	Role
1996	Broken Sword: The Shadow of the Templars	Additional voices
2000	Sheep	Additional voices
2004	Fable	Additional voices
2004	Dragon Quest: Journey of the Cursed King	Additional voices
2006	Thomas & Friends: Special Delivery	Narrator
2010	Thomas & Friends: Hero of the Rails	Narrator
2011	Ni no Kuni	Additional voices
2013	Puppeteer	General Snake; General Sheep
2019	Total War: Warhammer III	Eshin Sorcerer
2023	Disney Illusion Island	Mazzy/Grayzar
