= Douglas Walker (artist) =

Canadian painter (born 1958)

- Born: 1958 (age 67–68); Brockville, Ontario, Canada
- Known for: painter

Douglas Walker (born 1958) is a Canadian painter living and working in Toronto, Ontario, Canada.

== Early life and training ==
Douglas Walker was born in Brockville, Ontario, Canada in 1958. He attended the Ontario College of Art and graduated with an Honours Diploma in 1981.

== Early works ==
Walker's early imagery aligned with outsider art and tattoo culture. In the mid-1980s, he produced photograms developed from scratched drawings on plastic, large manipulated black-and-white photographs, sculpture and miniature landscapes, and small oil paintings on panel that evolved into larger works on paper.

== Recent works ==
Douglas Walker creates scenes of bleak and beautiful landscapes and architectural structures in a distinctive blue-and-white style. His creative influences include suspension bridges, landscapes by J. M. W. Turner, paint jobs on cars, skyscraper drawings by Hugh Ferriss, chinoiserie, moon paintings by Chesley Bonestell, blue and white pottery, botanical illustrations, the DIY technique of Henri Rousseau, airbrush illustrations of tools in old catalogues, the fantasies of John Martin, Chinese brush paintings, and children's books.

In his oil-on-masonite works, Walker simulates the effects of time by using a resist technique to instil crackles and scratches over brush techniques. Each new work is numbered, the numbers dating back over 20 years.

In his public works, Walker uses glass tile to create blue-and-white murals. An oil and mylar painting is cut into squares and hermetically sealed between two pieces of thick Starphire glass.

The scale of Walker's work ranges from 'picture size'’ to entire gallery walls, up to 14 by 76 feet. Pieces in his Other Worlds exhibition are custom-scaled to fit each gallery.

== Exhibitions and awards ==
Walker has exhibited his work at the Institute of Contemporary Arts in London and the Dia Art Foundation in New York City. In Toronto, he has shown at the Art Gallery of Ontario, The Power Plant, YYZ, the Mercer Union and at the Museum of Contemporary Canadian Art. Walker has been the focus of a traveling mid-career retrospective curated by the Mendel Art Gallery in Saskatoon and an overview of his career was featured at the Kitchener-Waterloo Art Gallery. He has also shown at the Art Gallery of Nova Scotia, the Winnipeg Art Gallery, the Dunlop Art Gallery in Regina, the Agnes Etherington Art Centre in Kingston, the Canadian Museum of Contemporary Photography in Ottawa, Hallwalls in Buffalo, and the 49th Parallel in New York City.

Walker's work is included in public and private collections – most notably the Art Gallery of Ontario, Mendel Art Gallery and Canadian Museum of Contemporary Photography. He has won grants from the Canada Council for the Arts, the Ontario Arts Council and the Toronto Arts Council.
