= Blue Zoo Animation Studio =

British animation studio

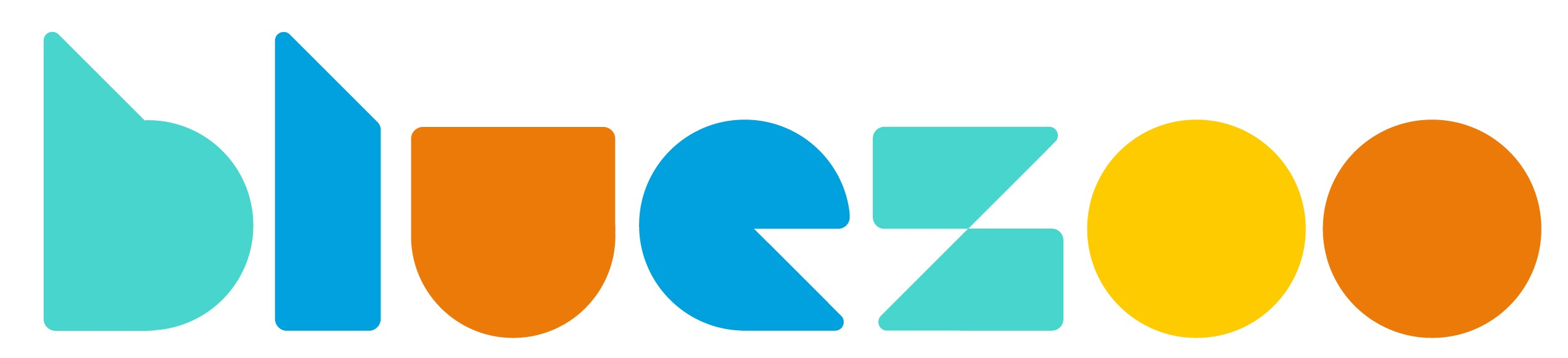
- Logo used since 2012
- Industry: Animation; Television production Advertising
- Founded: 2000
- Founders: Oli Hyatt; Adam Shaw; Tom Box
- Headquarters: London, England
- Subsidiaries: Brighton Zoo; Kazoo Animation
- Website: www.blue-zoo.co.uk

Blue Zoo Animation Studio is a British animation studio known for producing children's television series, commercials and short films. Founded in 2000 by Oli Hyatt, Adam Shaw, and Tom Box from Bournemouth University, the studio has gone on to win numerous BAFTAs and in 2021 won two Daytime Emmy awards. They have also previously won the Best Places to Work in TV survey by Broadcast and Best Companies Group.

Some of the more well-known children's shows the studio has produced are Alphablocks, Numberblocks, Digby Dragon, Miffy's Adventures Big and Small, The Adventures of Paddington, Tree Fu Tom, and It's Pony.

The company operates from a studio in Fitzrovia, London, where they have a team of over 200 artists. Blue Zoo later opened a second studio in Brighton called Brighton Zoo in 2022, in the partnership with Plug-In Media, and is 'dedicated to episodic 2D animation'.

In 2021, the company became the first major animation studio in the world to achieve B Corp certification.

== History ==
In December 2009, Blue Zoo Animation Studio entered the video platform service by partnering with animator Junior Jesman and distributor Cake Entertainment to develop and produce an animated web series entitled If I Was... for French streaming network Dailymotion with Blue Zoo providing and developing animation services and Cake Entertainment distributing the series online.

In April 2014, Blue Zoo and a Dutch company Mercis BV collaborated on the production of Miffy animated CGI series, which was released one year later.

In 2019, Blue Zoo launched its rights division dedicated to its own and third-party productions named Blue Zoo Rights headed by Alison Warner.

During the annual Cartoon Forum held in September of the same year, Blue Zoo partnered with Belgian production company Studio 100, through the latter's distribution arm Studio 100 Media and its subsidiary m4e, to produce an CGI-animated preschool series entitled Monika's Garden, but no news for that series was made since.

In 2022, Blue Zoo and Brighton-based producer Plug-In Media established a joint-venture regional animation production and interactive studio called Brighton Zoo, based in Brighton, South England. Their first collaboration and animated production was Supertato. Later in the same year, Blue Zoo expanded into the French production business by partnering with Paris-based animation production studio Samka Productions to launch an animation studio and post-production company called Kazoo Animation.

In 2024, the company's show Numberblocks reached 10 million subscribers on YouTube.

== List of long form productions ==
=== Television ===
Title	Years	Network	Notes
The Story Makers	2002–2004	CBeebies	Animation services for Blue Cow segments only, produced by BBC Children's Production
Tikkabilla	2002–2007	CBeebies	Animation services for animated segments and Sami's Worlds only, produced by BBC Children's Production
Those Scurvy Rascals	2005–2006	Nickelodeon UK	co-production with Entara
Doodle Do	2006	CBeebies	Animation for Sandworm segments only, produced by BBC Children's Production
Kerwhizz	2008–2011	CBeebies	Co-production with BBC Children's Production and Studio 100
Alphablocks	2010–present	CBeebies	co-production with Alphablocks LTD
Olive the Ostrich	2011–2014	Nick Jr. UK	
Tree Fu Tom	2012–2016	CBeebies	Animation services only, produced by BBC Children's Production and FremantleMedia Kids & Family, owned by Boat Rocker Studios since 2018.
Q Pootle 5	2013–2014	CBeebies	co-production with Snapper Productions and ZDF Studios
Miffy's Adventures Big and Small	2015–2017	Tiny Pop; KRO-NCRV (Netherlands)	co-production with Mercis BV and Telescreen
Go Jetters	2015–2020	CBeebies	Animation services from season 2 to season 3, co-production with BBC Studios and BBC Children's Production
Digby Dragon	2016–2018	Nick Jr. UK & Channel 5	co-production with Aardman Animations
Mac & Izzy	2016	YouTube	Co-production with WGBH Boston and Houghton Mifflin Harcourt, owned by HarperCollins since 2021.
Numberblocks	2017–present	CBeebies	co-production with Alphablocks LTD
The Adventures of Paddington	2019–2025	Nick Jr. UK; Gulli, M6 & Piwi+ (France); Nickelodeon (international)	co-production with StudioCanal, Heyday Films and Superprod Animation
It's Pony	2020–2022	Nickelodeon UK; Nickelodeon/Nicktoons (United States)	co-production with Nickelodeon Animation Studio
Pip and Posy	2021–present	Sky Kids, Channel 5 & Nick Jr. UK	co-production with Magic Light Pictures
Millie & Lou	2022	YouTube	
Big Tree City	2022	Netflix	
Supertato	2022–present	CBeebies; Tencent Video (China)	Under Brighton Zoo, co-production with BBC Studios Kids & Family
Lego City: No Limits	2023–present	ITVX; YouTube	co-production with The Lego Group
Mojo Swoptops	2024–present	CBeebies	co-production with Tararaboom
Wonderblocks	2025–present	CBeebies	co-production with Alphablocks LTD
Doctor Who: TARDIS Crew	2027–2029	CBeebies	

=== Television shorts ===
Title	Release date	Broadcaster	Notes
Superworm	2021	BBC One	co-production with Magic Light Pictures
The Smeds and the Smoos	2022	BBC One	co-production with Magic Light Pictures

== List of awards and accolades ==
Year	Award	Category	Nominee(s)	Result	Ref.
2006	Children's BAFTA	Animation	Those Scurvy Rascals	Nominated	
2008	Children's BAFTA	Short Form	Stitch Up Showdown	Nominated	
2009	Children's BAFTA	Short Form	My Favourite Bedtime Story	Nominated	
2009	Children's BAFTA	Breakthrough Talent	Adam Shaw	Won	
2010	Children's BAFTA	Learning - Primary	Alphablocks	Nominated	
2010	Children's BAFTA	Short Form	My Favourite Bedtime Story	Won	
2012	Children's BAFTA	Pre-School Animation	Tree Fu Tom	Nominated	
2012	Children's BAFTA	Independent Production Company	Blue Zoo Animation Studio	Won	
2014	Children's BAFTA	Short Form	Gumball Song	Nominated	
2014	Children's BAFTA	Independent Production Company	Blue Zoo Animation Studio	Nominated	
2016	Children's BAFTA	Independent Production Company	Blue Zoo Animation Studio	Nominated	
2017	Children's BAFTA	Learning	Numberblocks	Nominated	
2017	Children's BAFTA	Independent Production Company	Blue Zoo Animation Studio	Won	
2018	BAFTA Films	Short Film	Mamoon	Nominated	
2019	Children's BAFTA	Pre-School Animation	Digby Dragon	Nominated	
2019	Children's BAFTA	Pre-School Animation	Numberblocks	Won	
2020	Annies	Best TV/Media - Preschool	The Adventures of Paddington	Won	
2020	Annies	Best Voice Acting - TV/Media	It's Pony	Nominated	
2020	Annies	Best Production Design - TV/Media	The Adventures of Paddington	Nominated	
2016	PromaxBDA UK	Best Direct Response Promo	Bitesize	Won	
2015	PromaxBDA UK	Best Channel Identity	Nick Jr Rebrand	Won	
2015	PromaxBDA UK	Best Sponsorship Package	LEGO Star Wars Rebels	Won	
2021	Emmy Award	Outstanding Pre-School Children's Animated Series	The Adventures of Paddington	Won	
2021	Emmy Award	Outstanding Writing for a Pre-School Animated Program	The Adventures of Paddington	Won	
2021	Emmy Award	Outstanding Directing for a Pre-School Animated Program	The Adventures of Paddington	Nominated	
2024	British Animation Awards	Children's Choice	Lego City: No Limits	Nominated	
2024	British Animation Awards	Best Cutting Edge	Silly Duck	Nominated	
