= Doug Walker (musician) =

Musical artist based in Manchester

- Born: Doug Walker Chertsey, England
- Genres: Indie-pop
- Occupation: Musician
- Instruments: Voice, piano
- Years active: 2007–present
- Label: Warner Bros. Records
- Website: www.dougwalker.com

Doug Walker is an English singer and songwriter based in Manchester. Walker is best known for his single "The Mystery", which rose in popularity after being played by BBC Radio 1. This happened when Walker gave a copy of the recording to DJ Chris Moyles after turning up outside the Radio 1 studio on 28 August 2007 at 5.30 a.m. Subsequently, it was played at 7.20 a.m., and the radio station was inundated with emails and SMS texts. This exposure led to a life-changing opportunity for Walker, in which he met with record labels and signed with Warner Bros. Records on 12 October 2007.

"The Mystery" was released on 3 March 2008 as a download, and it entered the UK Singles Chart at No. 36 on March, 9th 2008.

Walker's debut album was produced by Danton Supple, who was responsible for X&Y by Coldplay and Silence Is Easy by Starsailor. After recording, Walker flew to New York City to mix his album with Michael Brauer. The album was released on CD in 2008.

Walker toured throughout 2007 and 2008, supporting artists including The Wombats, Kate Nash, Craig David, Amy MacDonald, The Enemy, The Subways and Sam Beeton.

His musical influences include Electric Light Orchestra, Jeff Buckley, U2, Sting, Radiohead, Sergei Rachmaninov, The Divine Comedy, Coldplay, Aqualung and Regina Spektor.

== Discography ==
=== Albums ===
- 'Fear Together' (unreleased)

=== Singles ===
Date of release	Title	UK Singles Chart
3 March 2008	"The Mystery"	No. 36
