= Educational program =

Course of education

An educational program is a program written by the institution or ministry of education which determines the learning progress of each subject in all the stages of formal education.

== See also ==
- Academic major
- Philosophy of education
- Curriculum
