= List of Independent Film Company films =

Independent Film Company (IFC, formerly IFC Films) released its first film on December 8, 2000, Spring Forward, a drama directed by Tom Gilroy that premiered at the Toronto International Film Festival in September 1999. The company has released over 985 movies ever since.

== 2000s ==
Release date	Title	Notes
December 8, 2000	Spring Forward	first release
March 30, 2001	Keep the River on Your Right: A Modern Cannibal Tale	
May 11, 2001	The King Is Alive	
May 23, 2001	Our Song	
July 6, 2001	Jump Tomorrow	
August 3, 2001	Thomas in Love	
August 24, 2001	Happy Accidents	
August 24, 2001	Together	
September 21, 2001	Go Tigers!	
December 7, 2001	The Business of Strangers	
February 22, 2002	Big Bad Love	
March 15, 2002	Y tu mamá también	North American distribution only.
April 12, 2002	Return of the Secaucus 7 (restoration)	
April 19, 2002	My Big Fat Greek Wedding	North American distribution only; Nominated - Golden Globe Award for Best Motion Picture – Musical or Comedy
June 14, 2002	Gangster No. 1	
August 9, 2002	The Château	
October 11, 2002	Ash Wednesday	
January 31, 2003	Lost in La Mancha	
March 7, 2003	The Safety of Objects	
March 8, 2003	The Brother from Another Planet (restoration)	
April 11, 2003	XX/XY	
April 25, 2003	A Decade Under the Influence	
April 25, 2003	Manic	
July 25, 2003	Camp	
September 19, 2003	Casa de los Babys	
October 10, 2003	Girls Will Be Girls	
January 23, 2004	Touching the Void	
February 20, 2004	Kitchen Stories	
March 19, 2004	Intermission	
April 21, 2004	This So-Called Disaster: Sam Shepard Directs the Last Henry Moss	
April 30, 2004	The Saddest Music in the World	
May 28, 2004	Frankie and Johnny Are Married	
June 23, 2004	Fahrenheit 9/11	Palme d'Or
June 25, 2004	The Intended	
July 9, 2004	Metallica: Some Kind of Monster	
September 10, 2004	When Will I Be Loved	
October 20, 2004	Sex Is Comedy	
February 4, 2005	Nobody Knows	
February 18, 2005	Turtles Can Fly	
March 8, 2005	The Ballad of Jack and Rose	
April 1, 2005	Dust to Glory	
April 19, 2005	Land of Plenty	
April 22, 2005	The Game of Their Lives	
May 6, 2005	Brothers	
June 17, 2005	Me and You and Everyone We Know	
July 22, 2005	The Edukators	
August 26, 2005	The Baxter	
September 21, 2005	Novo	
October 7, 2005	C.S.A.: The Confederate States of America	Under the IFC First Take label
November 11, 2005	Duane Hopwood	
December 2, 2005	Transamerica	
December 14, 2005	Happy Here and Now	
January 6, 2006	Kill the Poor	
January 20, 2006	Pizza	
January 27, 2006	Manderlay	
March 1, 2006	Sorry, Haters	
March 22, 2006	American Gun	
March 24, 2006	Lonesome Jim	
March 29, 2006	Drawing Restraint 9	
April 5, 2006	I Am a Sex Addict	
April 26, 2006	Three Times	
May 10, 2006	Russian Dolls	
May 19, 2006	12 and Holding	
May 31, 2006	Coastlines	
June 9, 2006	Mary	
June 16, 2006	Wordplay	
June 28, 2006	Rank	
July 14, 2006	Gabrielle	
July 26, 2006	Darshan: The Embrace	
July 28, 2006	Brothers of the Head	
August 9, 2006	The Trouble with Men and Women	
August 18, 2006	Factotum	
August 23, 2006	Princesas	
September 1, 2006	This Film Is Not Yet Rated	
September 6, 2006	Saint of 9/11	
September 8, 2006	Sherrybaby	
September 20, 2006	Sólo con Tu Pareja (re-release)	
October 4, 2006	...So Goes the Nation	
October 18, 2006	Requiem	
November 3, 2006	Unknown	
November 15, 2006	The Aura	
December 6, 2006	Family Law	
December 20, 2006	Matthew Barney: No Restraint	
January 17, 2007	Alone with Her	
January 31, 2007	An Unreasonable Man	
February 14, 2007	Close to Home	
February 16, 2007	Days of Glory	
February 28, 2007	Wild Tigers I Have Known	
March 7, 2007	The Exterminating Angels	
March 9, 2007	Believe in Me	
March 9, 2007	Beyond the Gates	
March 16, 2007	The Wind That Shakes the Barley	
March 30, 2007	After the Wedding	
April 13, 2007	Private Fears in Public Places	
April 27, 2007	Snow Cake	
May 9, 2007	Day Night Day Night	
May 23, 2007	The Boss of It All	
June 1, 2007	Pierrepoint	
June 22, 2007	Black Sheep	
July 11, 2007	Drama/Mex	
July 13, 2007	You Kill Me	
July 27, 2007	This Is England	
August 3, 2007	My Best Friend	
August 8, 2007	Dans Paris	
August 22, 2007	Hannah Takes the Stairs	
August 24, 2007	Deep Water	
September 5, 2007	I Want Someone to Eat Cheese With	
September 19, 2007	The Last Winter	
October 5, 2007	Finishing the Game	
October 19, 2007	Out of the Blue	
November 2, 2007	Joe Strummer: The Future Is Unwritten	
November 28, 2007	Chronicle of an Escape	
November 30, 2007	Protagonist	
December 19, 2007	Flakes	
January 2, 2008	The Killing of John Lennon	
January 25, 2008	4 Months, 3 Weeks and 2 Days	
February 6, 2008	How to Rob a Bank	
February 22, 2008	The Duchess of Langeais	
February 29, 2008	Jar City	
February 29, 2008	It's a Free World...	
February 29, 2008	Puffball	
February 29, 2008	Beautiful Ohio	
February 29, 2008	Good Time Max	
March 7, 2008	Paranoid Park	
March 21, 2008	Love Songs	
April 4, 2008	Flight of the Red Balloon	
April 18, 2008	Anamorph	
April 30, 2008	Mister Lonely	
April 30, 2008	PVC-1	
April 30, 2008	Superheroes	
April 30, 2008	Neal Cassady	
May 14, 2008	Sangre de Mi Sangre	
May 28, 2008	Savage Grace	
June 4, 2008	Après lui	
June 11, 2008	The Trial Begins	
June 13, 2008	My Winnipeg	
June 25, 2008	American Venus	
June 27, 2008	The Last Mistress	
July 2, 2008	Man in the Chair	
July 4, 2008	Diminished Capacity	
July 9, 2008	Goliath	
July 16, 2008	Out There	
July 18, 2008	Mad Detective	
July 23, 2008	Cortex	
August 1, 2008	In Search of a Midnight Kiss	
August 6, 2008	Prisoner	
August 13, 2008	My Effortless Brilliance	
August 15, 2008	A Girl Cut in Two	
August 20, 2008	Fermat's Room	
August 27, 2008	My Mexican Shivah	
August 27, 2008	Swedish Auto	
September 5, 2008	Ping Pong Playa	
September 5, 2008	A Secret	
September 10, 2008	Room of Death	
September 17, 2008	All of God's Children can Dance	
September 19, 2008	Elite Squad	
October 1, 2008	Cash	
October 3, 2008	Just Buried	
October 10, 2008	Nights and Weekends	
October 15, 2008	Southern Gothic	
October 17, 2008	Filth and Wisdom	
October 22, 2008	Fear(s) of the Dark	
October 22, 2008	The Pleasure of Being Robbed	
October 29, 2008	Home Movie	
November 3, 2008	Nitro	
November 5, 2008	The Last Deadly Mission	
November 14, 2008	A Christmas Tale	
November 26, 2008	Fighter	
November 28, 2008	Rome & Jewel	
December 5, 2008	Hunger	
December 10, 2008	Trivial	
December 10, 2008	In a Day	
December 12, 2008	Che	
December 12, 2008	Where God Left His Shoes	
December 17, 2008	Up with Me	
December 19, 2008	The Last Romantic	
December 24, 2008	The Secret of the Grain	
December 24, 2008	2:37	
January 7, 2009	The Appeared	
January 14, 2009	Nightmare	
January 14, 2009	Trail of the Screaming Forehead	
January 21, 2009	Foul Gesture	
January 23, 2009	Dog Eat Dog	
January 23, 2009	California Dreamin'	
January 28, 2009	Worlds Apart	
January 28, 2009	French Film	
January 30, 2009	Medicine for Melancholy	
February 4, 2009	The Objective	
February 11, 2009	The Wild Man of the Navidad	
February 11, 2009	Corrobree	
February 13, 2009	Gomorrah	
February 18, 2009	Mermaid	
February 25, 2009	White Night Wedding	
February 25, 2009	Left Bank	
March 6, 2009	Everlasting Moments	
March 11, 2009	Zift	
March 13, 2009	Paper Covers Rock	
March 13, 2009	Alexander the Last	
March 18, 2009	Angel	
March 18, 2009	Three Blind Mice	
March 25, 2009	Sauna	
April 1, 2009	Rain	
April 3, 2009	The Escapist	
April 8, 2009	Hush	
April 8, 2009	The 27 Club	
April 15, 2009	À l'aventure	
April 17, 2009	Lemon Tree	
April 22, 2009	Frontier of the Dawn	
April 29, 2009	How to Be	
May 1, 2009	The Skeptic	
May 6, 2009	Life in Flight	
May 6, 2009	Dark Mirror	
May 15, 2009	Summer Hours	
May 20, 2009	Cadaver	
May 20, 2009	Heaven's Heart	
May 22, 2009	New World Order	
May 27, 2009	The Man from London	
May 29, 2009	Pontypool	
June 3, 2009	Strangers	
June 10, 2009	Fear Me Not	
June 17, 2009	Days of Darkness	
June 17, 2009	The Kreutzer Sonata	
June 19, 2009	Dead Snow	
June 24, 2009	Diary of a Nymphomaniac	
June 26, 2009	Quiet Chaos	
July 1, 2009	Faintheart	
July 3, 2009	I Hate Valentine's Day	
July 8, 2009	The Disappeared	
July 8, 2009	The Waiting Room	
July 8, 2009	The Uninvited	
July 15, 2009	Mothers & Daughters	
July 22, 2009	Before the Fall	
July 29, 2009	The Girl by the Lake	
July 31, 2009	Flame & Citron	
August 5, 2009	Cass	
August 5, 2009	Someone Else	
August 7, 2009	I Sell the Dead	
August 12, 2009	The Undeserved	
August 19, 2009	A Quiet Little Marriage	
August 21, 2009	Five Minutes of Heaven	
August 26, 2009	Passing Strange	
August 28, 2009	Still Walking	
September 2, 2009	Unmade Beds	
September 2, 2009	Last Stop 174	
September 9, 2009	May the Best Woman Win	
September 16, 2009	Summer Holiday	
September 18, 2009	Paris	
September 23, 2009	Better Things	
September 25, 2009	Brief Interviews with Hideous Men	
October 2, 2009	Afterschool	
October 7, 2009	Disengagement	
October 7, 2009	Public Sex	
October 14, 2009	Mary and Max	
October 14, 2009	Death Bell	
October 21, 2009	Antichrist	
October 21, 2009	I'm Gonna Explode	
October 21, 2009	Tormented	
October 28, 2009	The Beautiful Person	
November 4, 2009	I'll Come Running	
November 6, 2009	A French Gigolo	
November 11, 2009	The Necessities of Life	
November 13, 2009	Uncertainty	
November 18, 2009	Adulthood	
November 20, 2009	Mammoth	
November 25, 2009	Return to Rajapur	
November 27, 2009	Kassim the Dream	
December 2, 2009	Made for Each Other	
December 2, 2009	Sex Traffic	
December 16, 2009	Ricky	
December 23, 2009	Police, Adjective	
December 23, 2009	Night and Day	
December 30, 2009	The Chaser	
December 30, 2009	The Ghost	
December 30, 2009	Nick Nolte: No Exit	

== 2010s ==
Denotes released under IFC Films
Denotes released under Sundance Selects
Denotes released under IFC Midnight

Release date	Movie	Notes
January 6, 2010	Dangerous Parking	
January 6, 2010	A Film with Me in It	
January 13, 2010	Coffin Rock	
January 13, 2010	A Complete History of My Sexual Failures	
January 13, 2010	Paintball	
January 13, 2010	The Joy of Singing	
January 15, 2010	White Lightnin'	
January 20, 2010	Angel of Mine	
January 22, 2010	7 Days	
January 27, 2010	Fish Tank	
January 27, 2010	Birdwatchers	
January 29, 2010	Falling Awake	
February 3, 2010	Red Riding	
February 10, 2010	Mutants	
February 10, 2010	3some	
February 17, 2010	The Overbrook Brothers	
February 19, 2010	Once More with Feeling	
February 24, 2010	Broke Sky	
February 26, 2010	The Art of the Steal	
March 3, 2010	The Debt	
March 12, 2010	Stolen	
March 12, 2010	My Enemy's Enemy	
March 12, 2010	Le Donk & Scor-zay-zee	
March 17, 2010	Older than America	
March 19, 2010	Vincere	
March 24, 2010	Storage	
March 26, 2010	Against the Current	
April 2, 2010	Breaking Upwards	
April 7, 2010	Eloïse's Lover	
April 9, 2010	Sounds Like Teen Spirit	
April 16, 2010	No One Knows About Persian Cats	
April 21, 2010	Accomplices	
April 23, 2010	Boogie Woogie	
April 23, 2010	The Good, the Bad, the Weird	
April 23, 2010	Under Still Waters	
April 28, 2010	The Human Centipede (First Sequence)	
April 28, 2010	Alarm	
April 30, 2010	Mercy	
April 30, 2010	Lovers of Hate	
May 5, 2010	The Possession of David O'Reilly	
May 5, 2010	All Around Us	
May 12, 2010	When A Man Comes Home	
May 14, 2010	Looking for Eric	
May 14, 2010	Daddy Longlegs	
May 14, 2010	Convention	
May 19, 2010	One Week	
May 21, 2010	Perrier's Bounty	
May 28, 2010	Father of My Children	
June 2, 2010	Sorry, Thanks	
June 9, 2010	Doghouse	
June 11, 2010	Joan Rivers: A Piece of Work	
June 11, 2010	A Year Ago in Winter	
June 11, 2010	Made in China	
June 18, 2010	The Killer Inside Me	
June 18, 2010	Let It Rain	
June 23, 2010	Don't Look Back	
June 23, 2010	The Shock Doctrine	
July 7, 2010	Bunny and the Bull	
July 7, 2010	The New Protocol	
July 16, 2010	Valhalla Rising	
July 21, 2010	Cell 211	
July 21, 2010	Johnny Mad Dog	
July 23, 2010	Life During Wartime	
July 23, 2010	Exam	
August 4, 2010	Colin Fitz Lives! (re-release)	
August 6, 2010	Cairo Time	
August 11, 2010	The Horde	
August 13, 2010	Vengeance	
August 20, 2010	Soul Kitchen	
August 20, 2010	Making Plans for Lena	
August 25, 2010	Map of the Sounds of Tokyo	
August 27, 2010	Change of Plans	
September 1, 2010	Happy Ever Afters	
September 10, 2010	Heartbreaker	
September 15, 2010	Macho	
September 15, 2010	Cole	
September 22, 2010	Primal	
September 24, 2010	Enter the Void	
October 1, 2010	Leaving	
October 6, 2010	Room in Rome	
October 8, 2010	Red White & Blue	
October 13, 2010	Shadow	
October 15, 2010	Carlos	
October 20, 2010	High Lane	
October 22, 2010	Inhale	
October 27, 2010	Student Services	
October 29, 2010	Inspector Bellamy	
November 3, 2010	The Orgasm Diaries	
November 5, 2010	Beneath the Dark	
November 10, 2010	Sex Magic	
November 10, 2010	Secret Sunshine	
November 12, 2010	Tiny Furniture	
November 17, 2010	Victim	
November 19, 2010	Heartless	
November 19, 2010	White Material	
December 1, 2010	Black Heaven	
December 3, 2010	Prey	
December 8, 2010	In Their Sleep	
December 10, 2010	Shoah (re-release)	
December 10, 2010	And Everything Is Going Fine	
December 24, 2010	Hadewijch	
January 5, 2011	Exorcismus	
January 7, 2011	The Time That Remains	
January 21, 2011	Tetsuo: The Bullet Man	
January 21, 2011	These Amazing Shadows	
January 21, 2011	The Housemaid	
January 21, 2011	Mad Bastards	
January 26, 2011	Uncle Kent	
January 28, 2011	Kaboom	
February 4, 2011	The Other Woman	
February 4, 2011	Cold Weather	
February 11, 2011	In Her Skin	
February 11, 2011	Dream Home	
February 18, 2011	We Are What We Are	
February 25, 2011	Heartbeats	
March 11, 2011	Certified Copy	
March 11, 2011	Park Benches	
March 18, 2011	Cracks	
March 18, 2011	Choose	
March 25, 2011	Peep World	
April 1, 2011	Super	
April 1, 2011	Wrecked	
April 6, 2011	They're Out of the Business	
April 8, 2011	X	
April 15, 2011	The Imperialists Are Still Alive!	
April 15, 2011	The Princess of Montpensier	
April 22, 2011	Stake Land	
April 29, 2011	Cave of Forgotten Dreams	
May 6, 2011	An Invisible Sign	
May 6, 2011	The Silent House	
May 13, 2011	L'Amour Fou	
May 27, 2011	Puzzle	
May 27, 2011	We Are the Night	
May 27, 2011	The Wave	
June 3, 2011	Love, Wedding, Marriage	
June 10, 2011	The Trip	
June 15, 2011	Kidnapped	
June 15, 2011	The Countess	
June 17, 2011	Buck	
July 1, 2011	Vampires	
July 8, 2011	Septien	
July 8, 2011	The Ledge	
July 15, 2011	Tabloid	
July 15, 2011	Salvation Boulevard	
July 15, 2011	The Shrine	
July 22, 2011	The Myth of the American Sleepover	
July 22, 2011	Autoerotic	
July 29, 2011	Spiderhole	
August 5, 2011	Dead Hooker in a Trunk	
August 5, 2011	Burke & Hare	
August 10, 2011	A Spanking in Paradise	
August 19, 2011	Flypaper	
August 26, 2011	Tales from the Golden Age	
August 26, 2011	Brighton Rock	
August 26, 2011	Julia's Eyes	
September 2, 2011	Love Crime	
September 2, 2011	Saint Nick	
September 9, 2011	The Black Power Mixtape 1967–1975	
September 9, 2011	Undocumented	
September 9, 2011	Chalet Girl	
September 23, 2011	Weekend	
October 7, 2011	The Human Centipede 2 (Full Sequence)	
October 19, 2011	The Catechism Cataclysm	
October 26, 2011	Sidewalls	
November 2, 2011	A Lonely Place to Die	
November 11, 2011	London Boulevard	
November 11, 2011	Into the Abyss	
November 25, 2011	House of Pleasures	
December 2, 2011	Sleeping Beauty	
December 2, 2011	Albatross	
December 9, 2011	My Piece of the Pie	
December 23, 2011	Pina	
January 11, 2012	Loosies	
January 27, 2012	Declaration of War	
February 3, 2012	Kill List	
February 3, 2012	Perfect Sense	
February 24, 2012	Forgiveness of Blood	
March 2, 2012	Last Days Here	
March 2, 2012	The Snowtown Murders	
March 9, 2012	The Decoy Bride	
March 16, 2012	Kid with a Bike	
March 21, 2012	Brake	
March 23, 2012	4:44 Last Day on Earth	
March 30, 2012	The Corridor	
April 6, 2012	ATM	
April 6, 2012	We Have a Pope	
April 20, 2012	Penumbra	
April 20, 2012	The Moth Diaries	
April 20, 2012	Goodbye First Love	
April 27, 2012	Citizen Gangster	
April 27, 2012	Area 407	
May 4, 2012	First Position	
May 4, 2012	Asylum Blackout	
May 18, 2012	The Samaritan	
May 18, 2012	Polisse	
May 18, 2012	Entrance	
June 1, 2012	Sexual Chronicles of a French Family	
June 8, 2012	Peace, Love & Misunderstanding	
June 15, 2012	Your Sister's Sister	
June 15, 2012	The Tortured	
June 27, 2012	Burning Man	
June 29, 2012	A Burning Hot Summer	
July 6, 2012	The Pact	
July 13, 2012	Trishna	
July 27, 2012	Ai Weiwei: Never Sorry	
July 27, 2012	Rites of Spring	
August 17, 2012	Why Stop Now	
August 17, 2012	Beloved	
August 24, 2012	Sleepwalk with Me	
September 9, 2012	Crowsnest	
September 12, 2012	How to Survive a Plague	
September 14, 2012	Liberal Arts	
September 21, 2012	About Cherry	
October 4, 2012	In Their Skin	
October 19, 2012	The Flat	
October 26, 2012	The Loneliest Planet	
November 1, 2012	Cheerful Weather for the Wedding	
November 8, 2012	Save the Date	
November 16, 2012	Price Check	
November 16, 2012	Hellgate	
November 23, 2012	The Central Park Five	
November 30, 2012	Young and Wild	
November 30, 2012	Walk Away Renee	
December 5, 2012	Angels of Sex	
January 4, 2013	Crawlspace	
January 11, 2013	Welcome to the Machine	
January 11, 2013	My Best Enemy	
January 25, 2013	The Taste of Money	
January 25, 2013	Knife Fight	
February 1, 2013	As Luck Would Have It	
February 8, 2013	Would You Rather	
February 15, 2013	The Jeffrey Dahmer Files	
February 15, 2013	Like Someone in Love	
February 22, 2013	Inescapable	
March 8, 2013	Beyond the Hills	
March 15, 2013	My Amityville Horror	
March 22, 2013	Love and Honor	
March 22, 2013	Gimme the Loot	
March 22, 2013	On the Road	
March 27, 2013	Welcome to the Punch	
March 29, 2013	Room 237	
April 5, 2013	Simon Killer	
April 12, 2013	The Angels' Share	
April 12, 2013	Antiviral	
April 12, 2013	Errors of the Human Body	
April 26, 2013	The Reluctant Fundamentalist	
May 3, 2013	Something in the Air	
May 3, 2013	Tied	
May 10, 2013	Sightseers	
May 10, 2013	Java Heat	
May 17, 2013	Frances Ha	
June 7, 2013	Dirty Wars	
June 7, 2013	As Cool as I Am	
June 14, 2013	Berberian Sound Studio	
June 21, 2013	Maniac	
June 28, 2013	Byzantium	
July 5, 2013	The Look of Love	
July 12, 2013	Crystal Fairy & the Magical Cactus	
July 12, 2013	Dealin' with Idiots	
July 19, 2013	Grabbers	
July 26, 2013	Breaking the Girls	
August 2, 2013	The Canyons	
August 16, 2013	Ain't Them Bodies Saints	
August 23, 2013	Una Noche	
August 23, 2013	Devil's Pass	
September 13, 2013	Blue Caprice	
September 20, 2013	+1	
September 27, 2013	Dark Touch	
October 4, 2013	The Summit	
October 4, 2013	Dracula 3D	
October 18, 2013	Haunter	
October 23, 2013	Bastards	
October 25, 2013	Blue Is the Warmest Colour	Palme d'Or; Nominated - Golden Globe Award for Best Foreign Language Film
November 1, 2013	A Perfect Man	
November 6, 2013	A Case of You	
November 22, 2013	Contracted	
November 22, 2013	Is the Man Who Is Tall Happy?	
November 22, 2013	Everyday	
November 29, 2013	The Punk Singer	
December 6, 2013	White Reindeer	
December 13, 2013	Trap for Cinderella	
December 20, 2013	Wrong Cops	
December 20, 2013	The Selfish Giant	
January 1, 2014	The Best Offer	
January 8, 2014	Raze	
January 17, 2014	Like Father, Like Son	
January 24, 2014	Run & Jump	
January 24, 2014	24 Exposures	
February 3, 2014	Haunt	
February 14, 2014	Adult World	
February 14, 2014	Jimmy P: Psychotherapy of a Plains Indian	
February 21, 2014	Elaine Stritch: Shoot Me	
February 21, 2014	Almost Human	
February 28, 2014	Two Lives	
March 7, 2014	The Face of Love	
March 12, 2014	The Last Days	
March 14, 2014	The Den	
March 21, 2014	The French Minister	
March 28, 2014	Finding Vivian Maier	
April 4, 2014	Alien Abduction	
April 11, 2014	Hateship, Loveship	
April 11, 2014	Dancing in Jaffa	
April 18, 2014	Proxy	
April 18, 2014	A Promise	
April 25, 2014	Young & Beautiful	
May 2, 2014	Blood Glacier	
May 9, 2014	God's Pocket	
May 23, 2014	Wolf	
May 23, 2014	Gore Vidal: The United States of Amnesia	
May 23, 2014	Cold in July	
May 30, 2014	Lucky Them	
June 13, 2014	Witching & Bitching	
June 13, 2014	Hellion	
June 20, 2014	Venus in Fur	
June 27, 2014	Bound by Flesh	
June 27, 2014	Beneath	
July 2, 2014	Premature	
July 4, 2014	Beyond the Edge	
July 11, 2014	Boyhood	BAFTA Award for Best Film; Critics' Choice Movie Award for Best Picture; Golden Globe Award for Best Motion Picture – Drama; Nominated - Academy Award for Best Picture
July 25, 2014	The Damned	
July 30, 2014	War Story	
August 8, 2014	At the Devil's Door	
August 15, 2014	The Trip to Italy	
August 22, 2014	Cam2Cam	
August 29, 2014	Last Weekend	
September 5, 2014	The Pact 2	
September 5, 2014	Kelly & Cal	
September 12, 2014	Bird People	
September 26, 2014	Days and Nights	
September 26, 2014	Asmodexia	
October 3, 2014	Inner Demons	
October 3, 2014	The Blue Room	
October 17, 2014	Extraterrestrial	
October 17, 2014	Camp X-Ray	
October 31, 2014	Magical Universe	
November 7, 2014	Hangar 10	
November 21, 2014	The Sleepwalker	
November 28, 2014	The Babadook	
November 28, 2014	Before I Disappear	
December 5, 2014	Comet	
December 5, 2014	The Beast (re-release)	
December 12, 2014	Immoral Tales (re-release)	
December 12, 2014	Free the Nipple	
December 17, 2014	Goodbye to All That	
December 24, 2014	Two Days, One Night	
January 2, 2015	The Search for General Tso	
January 9, 2015	Dark Summer	
January 14, 2015	Match	
January 23, 2015	The Duke of Burgundy	
January 30, 2015	Alien Outpost	
February 13, 2015	Wyrmwood	
February 13, 2015	The Lovers	
February 25, 2015	Wild Canaries	
February 27, 2015	The Salvation	
February 27, 2015	Ejecta	
March 6, 2015	October Gale	
March 13, 2015	Seymour: An Introduction	
March 20, 2015	Backcountry	
March 27, 2015	Welcome to New York	
March 27, 2015	The Riot Club	
April 3, 2015	5 to 7	
April 10, 2015	Clouds of Sils Maria	
April 10, 2015	The Harvest	
April 17, 2015	Closer to the Moon	
April 17, 2015	Soul Boys of the Western World	
April 30, 2015	Reality	
May 8, 2015	The Seven Five	
May 8, 2015	The D Train	
May 15, 2015	Good Kill	
May 22, 2015	The Human Centipede 3 (Final Sequence)	
June 5, 2015	Hungry Hearts	
June 12, 2015	The Stranger	
June 19, 2015	Manglehorn	
June 26, 2015	Bound to Vengeance	
June 26, 2015	A Murder in the Park	
July 3, 2015	Stung	
July 10, 2015	Do I Sound Gay?	
July 17, 2015	The Stanford Prison Experiment	
July 24, 2015	A Gay Girl In Damascus: The Amina Profile	
July 24, 2015	Phoenix	
July 31, 2015	Jenny's Wedding	
August 14, 2015	One & Two	
August 19, 2015	Slow Learners	
August 26, 2015	Queen of Earth	
September 4, 2015	Contracted: Phase II	
September 9, 2015	Time Out of Mind	
September 11, 2015	Sleeping with Other People	
September 18, 2015	Hellions	
September 25, 2015	Misunderstood	
October 2, 2015	Narcopolis	
October 14, 2015	A Ballerina's Tale	
October 23, 2015	Asthma	
October 30, 2015	Bare	
November 5, 2015	The Hallow	
November 20, 2015	#Horror	
November 20, 2015	Mediterranea	
November 27, 2015	Submerged	
November 27, 2015	Killing them Safely	
December 4, 2015	Dementia	
December 4, 2015	Every Thing Will Be Fine	
December 4, 2015	Orion: The Man Who Would Be King	
December 11, 2015	Dixieland	
December 23, 2015	45 Years	U.S. distribution only
December 23, 2015	The Emperor's New Clothes	
January 8, 2016	Anesthesia	
January 8, 2016	The Abandoned	
January 8, 2016	The Treasure	
January 15, 2016	A Perfect Day	
January 22, 2016	Rabid Dogs	
February 5, 2016	The Pack	
February 12, 2016	Cabin Fever	
February 26, 2016	Marguerite & Julien	
February 26, 2016	King Georges	
March 4, 2016	Road Games (Fausse Route)	
March 11, 2016	City of Gold	
March 16, 2016	Last Night at the Alamo (restoration)	
March 18, 2016	The Preppie Connection	
March 25, 2016	Born to Be Blue	
March 25, 2016	Baskin	
April 8, 2016	The Dead Room	
April 8, 2016	11 Minutes	
April 15, 2016	Sky	
April 22, 2016	Tale of Tales	
April 29, 2016	Sacrifice	
April 29, 2016	The Man Who Knew Infinity	
May 6, 2016	Dheepan	
May 13, 2016	What We Become	
May 13, 2016	Pelé: Birth of a Legend	
May 20, 2016	Weiner	
June 10, 2016	Len and Company	
June 17, 2016	Department Q: The Keeper of Lost Causes	
June 17, 2016	Department Q: The Absent One	
June 17, 2016	Department Q: A Conspiracy of Faith	
June 24, 2016	Wiener-Dog	
June 24, 2016	Intruder	
July 1, 2016	Roseanne For President	
July 1, 2016	Carnage Park	
July 15, 2016	Free to Run	
July 22, 2016	The Childhood of a Leader	
July 29, 2016	Ants on a Shrimp	
July 29, 2016	Shelley	
July 29, 2016	The Land	
August 5, 2016	Let's Be Evil	
August 5, 2016	Richard Linklater: Dream Is Destiny	
August 12, 2016	Disorder	
August 19, 2016	Kampai! For the Love of Sake	
August 26, 2016	Complete Unknown	
August 26, 2016	I Am Not a Serial Killer	
September 2, 2016	Antibirth	
September 9, 2016	Dancer	
September 16, 2016	The Devil's Dolls	
September 23, 2016	The Free World	
September 30, 2016	Passage to Mars	
October 6, 2016	London Town	
October 14, 2016	Certain Women	
October 21, 2016	King Cobra	
November 18, 2016	Ali and Nino	
November 25, 2016	Tank 432	
November 25, 2016	Evolution	
December 2, 2016	Things to Come	
December 9, 2016	Beyond the Gates	
December 21, 2016	The Autopsy of Jane Doe	
January 6, 2017	Between Us	
January 13, 2017	Alone in Berlin	
January 20, 2017	The Axe Murders of Villisca	
February 3, 2017	Don't Knock Twice	
February 10, 2017	Sex Doll	
February 17, 2017	American Fable	
February 24, 2017	Kiki	
March 3, 2017	Wolves	
March 10, 2017	Personal Shopper	
March 17, 2017	The Devil's Candy	
March 24, 2017	House on Willow Street	
April 7, 2017	Queen of the Desert	
April 7, 2017	Graduation	
April 21, 2017	Citizen Jane: Battle for the City	
April 28, 2017	A Dark Song	
May 5, 2017	Chuck	
May 19, 2017	The Survivalist	
May 26, 2017	Wakefield	
June 2, 2017	Band Aid	
June 2, 2017	I, Daniel Blake	
June 16, 2017	The Journey	
June 30, 2017	Darkness Rising	
July 7, 2017	City of Ghosts	
July 21, 2017	Killing Ground	
July 28, 2017	From the Land of the Moon	
August 4, 2017	68 Kill	
August 11, 2017	The Trip to Spain	
August 18, 2017	Crown Heights	
September 1, 2017	Viceroy's House	
September 8, 2017	Rebel in the Rye	
September 8, 2017	The Unknown Girl	
September 22, 2017	Welcome to Willits	
September 22, 2017	Take Every Wave: The Life of Laird Hamilton	
October 6, 2017	Walking Out	
October 13, 2017	78/52	
October 20, 2017	Dealt	
November 1, 2017	Frank Serpico	
November 10, 2017	I Remember You	
November 17, 2017	Sweet Virginia	
December 1, 2017	The Tribes of Palos Verdes	
December 8, 2017	Kaleidoscope	
December 15, 2017	Desolation	
December 15, 2017	Killing for Love	
January 5, 2018	Devil's Gate	
January 12, 2018	Freak Show	
January 19, 2018	The Midnight Man	
January 26, 2018	A Ciambra	
February 2, 2018	The Cage Fighter	
February 9, 2018	The Female Brain	
February 16, 2018	The Housemaid	
February 23, 2018	The Cured	
March 2, 2018	Midnighters	
March 9, 2018	The Death of Stalin	
March 16, 2018	Furlough	
March 23, 2018	Pyewacket	
March 30, 2018	Love After Love	
April 6, 2018	Lowlife	
April 13, 2018	Wildling	
April 20, 2018	Ghost Stories	
April 27, 2018	Let the Sunshine In	
May 4, 2018	The 12th Man	
May 11, 2018	The Escape	
May 18, 2018	That Summer	
May 25, 2018	Mary Shelley	
May 25, 2018	Feral	
June 1, 2018	A Kid Like Jake	
June 15, 2018	Eating Animals	
June 22, 2018	The Catcher Was a Spy	
July 13, 2018	The Devil's Doorway	
July 20, 2018	Far from the Tree	
July 27, 2018	Our House	
August 10, 2018	Elizabeth Harvest	
August 17, 2018	Blaze	
August 24, 2018	What Keeps You Alive	
August 24, 2018	Pick of the Litter	
September 21, 2018	Tea with the Dames	
September 28, 2018	Black '47	
October 19, 2018	Wildlife	
October 26, 2018	Don't Go	
November 2, 2018	Welcome to Mercy	
November 16, 2018	The Clovehitch Killer	
November 30, 2018	DriverX	
December 7, 2018	Swimming with Men	
December 14, 2018	The House That Jack Built	
January 4, 2019	Rust Creek	
January 11, 2019	Pledge	
January 18, 2019	An Acceptable Loss	
February 15, 2019	Donnybrook	
March 1, 2019	The Wedding Guest	
March 22, 2019	Out of Blue	
March 29, 2019	Diane	
April 5, 2019	The Wind	
April 12, 2019	Mary Magdalene	
April 19, 2019	Red Joan	
April 26, 2019	I Trapped the Devil	
May 3, 2019	Non-Fiction	
May 10, 2019	Charlie Says	
June 7, 2019	Framing John DeLorean	
June 14, 2019	Hampstead	
June 21, 2019	The Quiet One	
June 28, 2019	Ophelia	
July 12, 2019	Trespassers	
July 12, 2019	Sword of Trust	
August 2, 2019	The Nightingale	
August 9, 2019	Ode to Joy	
August 23, 2019	Vita and Virginia	
August 30, 2019	Official Secrets	
September 13, 2019	Depraved	
September 13, 2019	The Sound of Silence	
September 20, 2019	Loro	
September 27, 2019	The Day Shall Come	
October 18, 2019	Greener Grass	
November 15, 2019	Radioflash	
December 6, 2019	Knives and Skin	

== 2020s ==
Denotes released under IFC Films
Denotes released under IFC Midnight

Release date	Movie	Notes
January 10, 2020	Three Christs	
February 14, 2020	Olympic Dreams	
February 21, 2020	Premature	
February 28, 2020	Disappearance at Clifton Hill	
March 6, 2020	Swallow	
March 27, 2020	Resistance	
April 3, 2020	The Other Lamb	
April 24, 2020	True History of the Kelly Gang	
May 1, 2020	The Wretched	
May 8, 2020	How to Build a Girl	
May 22, 2020	The Trip to Greece	
June 19, 2020	Babyteeth	
July 3, 2020	The Truth	
July 3, 2020	Relic	
July 17, 2020	The Painted Bird	
July 24, 2020	The Rental	
July 31, 2020	Summerland	
August 7, 2020	Made in Italy	
August 14, 2020	Sputnik	
August 21, 2020	Tesla	
August 28, 2020	Centigrade	
September 11, 2020	Rent-A-Pal	
September 18, 2020	The Nest	
September 25, 2020	Ottolenghi and the Cakes of Versailles	
October 2, 2020	A Call to Spy	
October 16, 2020	Shithouse	
November 6, 2020	Kindred	
November 20, 2020	Embattled	
November 25, 2020	Stardust	
December 4, 2020	Dear Santa	
December 11, 2020	Farewell Amor	
December 18, 2020	Hunter Hunter	
January 15, 2021	MLK/FBI	
January 22, 2021	No Man's Land	
January 29, 2021	The Night	
February 5, 2021	Little Fish	
February 19, 2021	Blithe Spirit	
February 26, 2021	The Vigil	
March 5, 2021	My Salinger Year	
March 12, 2021	Come True	
March 19, 2021	Last Call	
March 26, 2021	Six Minutes to Midnight	
April 9, 2021	Moffie	
April 16, 2021	Monday	
May 7, 2021	Mainstream	
May 14, 2021	The Djinn	
May 21, 2021	The Dry	
June 4, 2021	Undine	
June 11, 2021	Holler	
June 25, 2021	Werewolves Within	
July 23, 2021	Settlers	
July 30, 2021	Enemies of the State	
August 6, 2021	John and the Hole	
August 13, 2021	The Meaning of Hitler	
August 20, 2021	Demonic	
September 3, 2021	We Need to Do Something	
September 10, 2021	Dating and New York	
September 17, 2021	The Nowhere Inn	
October 1, 2021	Falling for Figaro	
October 15, 2021	Bergman Island	
November 5, 2021	The Beta Test	
November 19, 2021	The Feast	
November 19, 2021	Kurt Vonnegut: Unstuck in Time	
December 3, 2021	Benedetta	
December 17, 2021	The Novice	
January 7, 2022	See for Me	
January 28, 2022	Clean	
February 11, 2022	Catch the Fair One	
February 18, 2022	A Banquet	
March 4, 2022	Huda's Salon	
March 18, 2022	The Torch	
March 30, 2022	Nitram	
April 1, 2022	Barbarians	
April 8, 2022	Cow	
April 15, 2022	Paris, 13th District	
April 29, 2022	Hatching	
May 6, 2022	Happening	
May 13, 2022	The Innocents	
May 20, 2022	Hold Your Fire	
June 3, 2022	Watcher	
June 17, 2022	Official Competition	
June 24, 2022	Flux Gourmet	
July 1, 2022	Rubikon	
July 8, 2022	Both Sides of the Blade	
July 15, 2022	She Will	
July 29, 2022	Resurrection	
August 12, 2022	Rogue Agent	
August 19, 2022	Spin Me Round	
September 2, 2022	Burial	
September 16, 2022	God's Country	
September 30, 2022	Vesper	
October 7, 2022	Pretty Problems	
November 11, 2022	Bar Fight!	
November 18, 2022	Bad Axe	
December 2, 2022	Four Samosas	
December 16, 2022	The Almond and the Seahorse	
December 23, 2022	Corsage	
January 13, 2023	Skinamarink	Final film released as IFC Midnight.
January 27, 2023	Life Upside Down	
February 10, 2023	Consecration	
February 24, 2023	God's Time	
March 24, 2023	The Lost King	
April 7, 2023	Paint	
April 14, 2023	Rare Objects	
April 28, 2023	R.M.N.	
May 12, 2023	Monica	
May 12, 2023	BlackBerry	
July 7, 2023	Biosphere	
July 14, 2023	Lakota Nation vs. United States	
August 4, 2023	What Comes Around	
August 18, 2023	Birth/Rebirth	
September 22, 2023	The Origin of Evil	
October 6, 2023	When Evil Lurks	
November 17, 2023	The Disappearance of Shere Hite	
January 5, 2024	Mayhem!	
January 26, 2024	American Star	
February 9, 2024	The Taste of Things	
February 23, 2024	Stopmotion	
March 22, 2024	Late Night with the Devil	
April 26, 2024	Humane	
May 10, 2024	Force of Nature: The Dry 2	
May 31, 2024	In a Violent Nature	
June 14, 2024	Ghostlight	
July 12, 2024	Dandelion	
July 19, 2024	Oddity	
August 16, 2024	Skincare	
August 30, 2024	Out Come the Wolves	
September 27, 2024	Azrael	
October 25, 2024	Memoir of a Snail	Nominated - Academy Award for Best Animated Feature
November 8, 2024	Christmas Eve in Miller's Point	
November 29, 2024	Armand	
December 6, 2024	Get Away	
January 24, 2025	Inheritance	
March 7, 2025	The Rule of Jenny Pen	
April 4, 2025	The Luckiest Man in America	
May 30, 2025	Tornado	Final film released as IFC Films
June 6, 2025	Dangerous Animals	First film released as Independent Film Company
June 27, 2025	Hot Milk	
September 5, 2025	The Baltimorons	
October 3, 2025	Good Boy	
October 24, 2025	Queens of the Dead	
October 31, 2025	Violent Ends	
December 5, 2025	100 Nights of Hero	
December 24, 2025	The Plague	
February 6, 2026	Whistle	
February 20, 2026	This Is Not a Test	
March 6, 2026	Dolly	
March 27, 2026	Forbidden Fruits	
April 10, 2026	Faces of Death	
April 24, 2026	Over Your Dead Body	
May 22, 2026	Saccharine	
June 5, 2026	Chum	
July 10, 2026	Night Nurse	
July 24, 2026	Motor City	
August 28, 2026	Idiots	
August 28, 2026	The Sun Never Sets	
September 25, 2026	The Stunt Driver	
October 28, 2026	Breeder	
November 6, 2026	Mouse	

== Upcoming ==
Release date	Title	Notes
November 20, 2026	Best Pancakes in the County	
November 27, 2026	Tangles	awards-qualifying run; opens nationwide on January 15, 2027
January 15, 2027	River	original distributor; distributed by Universal Pictures
February 12, 2027	In a Violent Nature: Part 2	

=== Undated films ===
Release date	Title	Notes
2027	Rapture	
TBA	Menace	
TBA	Peaches	
