= With or Without You (1999 film) =

- Directed by: Michael Winterbottom
- Written by: John Forte
- Produced by: Andrew Eaton
- Starring: Christopher Eccleston; Dervla Kirwan
- Cinematography: Benoît Delhomme
- Edited by: Trevor Waite
- Music by: Adrian Johnston
- Production companies: FilmFour; Miramax; Revolution Films
- Distributed by: Video Collection International
- Release date: 3 September 1999 (Venice Film Festival)
- Running time: 86 minutes
- Country: United Kingdom
- Language: English

With or Without You is a 1999 British romantic drama film directed by Michael Winterbottom and starring Christopher Eccleston and Dervla Kirwan. Set in Belfast, it tells the story of a married couple trying to have children. Their efforts are interrupted and their marriage is tested when past loves re-enter their lives.

== Plot ==
Rosie (Dervla Kirwan) and Vincent Boyd (Christopher Eccleston) are a Northern Irish married couple living in Belfast. One evening they decide that they want to have a baby and start trying to conceive. Both make efforts individually and jointly to increase the chances of Rosie’s pregnancy, such as being precise about when to have sex during her period cycle. Weeks turn to months and after a year there’s still no sign of a baby so they visit an obstetrician to see what the issue may be. The doctor presents other options if there is a worse case scenario, such as adoption or sperm donation, the latter of which Vincent strongly opposes. In the meantime they wait for further information.

During work one day, Rosie receives a surprise visit from an old pen-pal of hers from France, Benoit (Yvan Attal). In lieu of an affordable place to stay, Rosie offers him the spare room at hers and Vincent’s who is mildly uncomfortable but decides not to argue. He drives to the hairdresser’s with Benoit to pick up his luggage. Rosie remains at home due to the hostility between her and the owner, Cathy (Julie Graham) as she is an old flame of Vincent’s.

One day while refitting windows on a property with the double glazing firm owned by Rosie’s father Sammy (Alun Armstrong), Vincent is visited by two friends, Brian (Michael Liebman) and Neil (Lloyd Hutchinson) who are old work colleagues of Vincent from when he was a policeman. While having a laugh, they invite Vincent for a round of Golf on Sunday. Initially hesitant, he happily tells them he’ll be there. Meanwhile, at the Waterfront, a function & arts centre where Rosie works on reception, Benoit is gifted a ticket from her to see an orchestra performance. Afterwards she gives him a little tour of Belfast and it’s clear they’re enjoying each other’s company. That night in bed, Vincent attempts to get a mood going but Rosie rejects him. Vincent is worried and asks her what’s wrong though she insists she’s fine and just doesn’t feel like it. When Vincent asks if it’s about him playing golf she admits that it’s irritating as her family were coming for Sunday lunch. He offers to cancel if it’ll make her less angry, which makes her more irritated and they have a row after which she goes to the toilet. Vincent glances after her as she checks in on Benoit who is fast asleep, before going back to bed himself.

Sunday arrives and the family are all having a roast dinner. Rosie’s father Sammy is there with his wife and her mother, Irene (Fionnula Flanagan) along with their other daughter, Rosie’s sister Lillian (Donna Dent) and her husband and their three children. Everything seems fine and formal, until Rosie intervenes in a scolding from Lillian to her son about table manners. When Lillian tells her to stay out of it as she doesn’t know what it’s like having kids, she takes this very personally and voices her disdain for her sister’s stubborn insensitivity adding that it’s not surprising she rarely joins social family events. Sammy defiantly orders them to stop, especially as Benoit is with them. After he jokes about ‘families’ the tension is somewhat diffused. At this point Vincent gets ready to go to golf. Irene suggests he take Benoit with him, but he’s not keen and says that he has no equipment of his own. He relents when Sammy suggests he caddy for him.

During the game, Vincent’s swing hits his ball off course. Frustrated, he goes to get it. Benoit curiously asks Brian and Neil about Vincent as a person. They inform him that he was brilliant at his job but left the force to work for the glazing firm to benefit his marriage. Neil implies this was a mistake, while Brian says he just did what he had to do. When alone with Vincent, Benoit makes an effort for a friendly conversation, though he’s very focused on his golfing. When Benoit says it’s very common for pregnancy to take a while, Vincent isn’t comfortable with him seemingly knowing a lot about his and Rosie’s personal issues which affects his concentration and technique. On the way home, having been drinking at the golf club, Vincent shows a more careless wild side that Benoit hasn’t seen before. He’s visibly worried about his driving under the influence, speeding and the loud music, though Vincent waves it off saying he’s on first name terms with all the police and they’ll be fine. A few days pass with the three still all under the same roof. Benoit announces he intends to move to Belfast as it’s grown on him. Rosie is happy at the news, while Vincent not only finds it negative but also unrealistic and doubts it’ll happen. Wanting a break and a vent he drives over to Cathy’s hairdressers though it is unclear what for. Nothing seems suspicious apart from the fact he doesn’t mention his visits there to Rosie.

One day at work, Rosie is having a very stressful day, treated with patronising arrogance by an English businessman Mr Deacon who’s there to give a talk, an angry conductor, Mr Zabrinska who has lost his baton and her continuing worries about not being able to get pregnant. When Benoit arrives to see her, she decides to take her lunch break. While in the centre cafe, she is called back to reception by her boss, Mr Ormonde (Gordon Kennedy) who angrily tells her never to leave her colleague Deirdre (Doon Mackichan) behind reception on her own and orders her to get on with her work. Finally deciding she’s had enough, she makes jokes over the speaker. She states that the businessman Mr Deacon’s prostitute has arrived at reception, the conductor Mr Zabrinska’s baton has been located up his rectum and to Mr Ormonde, she announces that he can stuff his job lyrically to the tune of “Loch Lomond” before quickly running out of the centre with Benoit.

Cathy, knowing that the glazing firm will likely send Vincent over, breaks her bedroom window on purpose and calls for an urgent repair. Sure enough, Vincent arrives to fit the new window. However when Cathy enters her bedroom completely naked to entice Vincent, he is surprised but instantly turned on and they have very loud and aggressive sex. The thrill seeking side of Vincent earlier seen in the car after golf appears to come out again, implying there’s a part of Vincent that misses the life he had before. At the Boyd’s house while Rosie is having a bath, Benoit decides to watch Vincent and Rosie’s wedding video. When she enters, she joins watching stating that she hasn’t seen it for a while. The two have a playful fight which spontaneously turns to a kiss. Rosie pulls away first and both apologise profusely, though she says it probably a bad idea him staying there with them. Feeling guilty and worried, she decides to call Vincent at work but when she finds out he’s doing a job at a hairdresser’s she immediately works out what is going on and call’s Cathy’s landline. When she picks up, Rosie demands to speak to Vincent before angrily insulting him and slamming down the phone before walking past the spare bedroom and seeing Benoit packing to leave revealing he can’t stay with her if he isn’t able to be with her. However, Rosie tells him that she’s going with him, which makes him so pleased. Vincent immediately gets dressed and leaves Cathy’s without fixing her window, leaving her furious. He calls Rosie’s work only to find out that she’s quit. Immediately fearing the worst, he arrives home looking for her and breaks down when he sees the car is gone.

Wanting to cheer Rosie up, Benoit puts a mixtape he sent her for her birthday in the car radio and both start singing along to the first track With Or Without You by U2. Vincent arrives at the glazing firm demanding to know if Rosie has phoned only to be met by Sammy demanding to know when he’s been all this time. Hearing the phone Vincent rushes to pick it up. While relieved to hear it’s Rosie calling, he becomes furious when he hears that Benoit is driving his car along the seafront. Knowing he has no license, Vincent rushes to the police station to see Neil and asks him to find them both. Neil tells Vincent to go home, take it easy and he’ll call him if he hears anything. That night while camping in the forest, Benoit and Rosie sleep together. Vincent is at home drinking on his own and leaving messages for Rosie. When he opens a letter from the GP informing him that Rosie is pregnant his initial excitement immediately turns to suspicion and despair when he worries that possibly the baby is Benoit’s and not his. He knows that Rosie was in love with Benoit before she met or even knew him. When Neil calls him to make sure he’s ok, Vincent worries that all hope is lost and his marriage is broken. However, when he notices a card with a temple on top of a cliff, he immediately rushes out of the house, leaving Neil on the receiver. In the morning Rosie is clearly troubled but doesn’t know how to say what’s on her mind, so Benoit tells her to write to him instead. When she does, she returns to the tent and shows Benoit the letter, before apologising and kissing him.

Meanwhile Vincent has driven his company van to the exact forest where they are located. When he sees Benoit returning to his car, he decides to wait in there and ambush him. Using his old police revolver Vincent threatens Benoit and chases him through the forest. Rosie hears the commotion and runs after them. Vincent catches up with Benoit and wrestles him into the sand before demanding to know if he slept with her and shooting the sand around him. Unwilling to commit murder Vincent walks away towards the sea in tears. After checking if Benoit is ok, she follows Vincent while Benoit looks on. They confront each other about their infidelities before Rosie hands Vincent the letter she wrote to Benoit earlier. It’s revealed that it said that despite her previous feelings for Benoit she loves Vincent and could never leave him. Feeling secure, Vincent then shows Rosie the piece of paper announcing that she is pregnant. She is overwhelmed with joy they both embrace and kiss in the middle of the beach, their marriage now stronger than ever.

About a year later, Rosie and Vincent’s baby Harry has had his christening and the house is full of family and friends including Rosie’s sister Lillian and Vincent’s mates, Brian and Neil. Benoit phones Rosie asking how to the christening went before telling her he’s happy for her and to send his wishes to Vincent. When she returns to the living room Sammy demands everyone get together for a photograph to savour this moment. As Sammy takes the picture, the movie ends on a happy and satisfying note

== Cast ==
- Christopher Eccleston as Vincent
- Dervla Kirwan as Rosie
- Yvan Attal as Benoit
- Julie Graham as Cathy
- Alun Armstrong as Sammy
- Lloyd Hutchinson as Neil
- Michael Liebmann as Brian
- Doon Mackichan as Dierdre
- Gordon Kennedy as Mr Ormonde
- Fionnula Flanagan as Irene
- Dan Gordon as Terry
- Ali White as The Obstetrician
- Donna Dent as Lillian
- Dierdre O’Kane as Sarah
- Peter Ballance as Andrew
- Thomas Baker as Gary
- Ruairi Furguson as Michael
- Reinout Halbertsma as Henry
- Sean McKenzie as Mr Deacon
- Uri Roodner as Conductor Zabrinska
- Mike Dowling as Wedding Video Minister
- David Gorray as Ricky
- Emma Moylan as Linda
- Nuala McKeever as Lizzy
- Alan McKee as Passport Officer
- Katia Caballero as Caroline
