= Trevor Waite =

English film editor

- Born: 1943
- Occupation: Film editor

Trevor Waite is an English film editor.

== Selected filmography ==
- Julius Caesar (2012)
- The Kid (2010)
- Red Riding: The Year of Our Lord 1983 (2009)
- Einstein and Eddington (2008)
- Is Anybody There? (2008)
- And When Did You Last See Your Father? (2007)
- The Girls Who Came to Stay (2006)
- Driving Lessons (2006)
- Bloodlines (2005)
- Beyond the Sea (2004)
- Hawking (2004)
- Octane (2003)
- Once Upon a Time in the Midlands (2002)
- 24 Hour Party People (2002)
- The Claim (2000)
- With or Without You (1999)
- Wonderland (1999)
- The War Zone (1999)
- I Want You (1998)
- Welcome to Sarajevo (1997)
- Jude (1996)
- Go Now (1995)
- Butterfly Kiss (1995)
- Family (1994)
- A Question of Guilt (1993)
- Fool's Gold: The Story of the Brink's-Mat Robbery (1992)
- Gawain and the Green Knight (1991)
- Somewhere to Run (1989)
