= 57th British Academy Film Awards =

2004 film awards ceremony

- Date: 15 February 2004
- Site: Odeon Leicester Square, London
- Hosted by: Stephen Fry

Highlights
- Best Film: The Lord of the Rings: The Return of the King
- Best British Film: Touching the Void
- Best Actor: Bill Murray; Lost in Translation
- Best Actress: Scarlett Johansson; Lost in Translation
- Most awards: Master and Commander: The Far Side of the World and The Lord of the Rings: The Return of the King (4)
- Most nominations: Cold Mountain (13)

The 57th British Academy Film Awards, more commonly known as the BAFTAs, took place on 15 February 2004 at the Odeon Leicester Square in London, honouring the best national and foreign films of 2003. Presented by the British Academy of Film and Television Arts, accolades were handed out for the best feature-length film and documentaries of any nationality that were screened at British cinemas in 2003.

The Lord of the Rings: The Return of the King won Best Film, Best Adapted Screenplay, Best Cinematography, Best Visual Effects, and the Audience Award. Lost in Translation won both lead acting awards for Bill Murray and Scarlett Johansson. Bill Nighy won Best Supporting Actor for Love Actually and Renée Zellweger won Best Supporting Actress for Cold Mountain. Touching the Void, directed by Andrew Eaton, was voted Outstanding British Film of 2003.

Stephen Fry hosted the ceremony for the third consecutive year.

== Winners and nominees ==
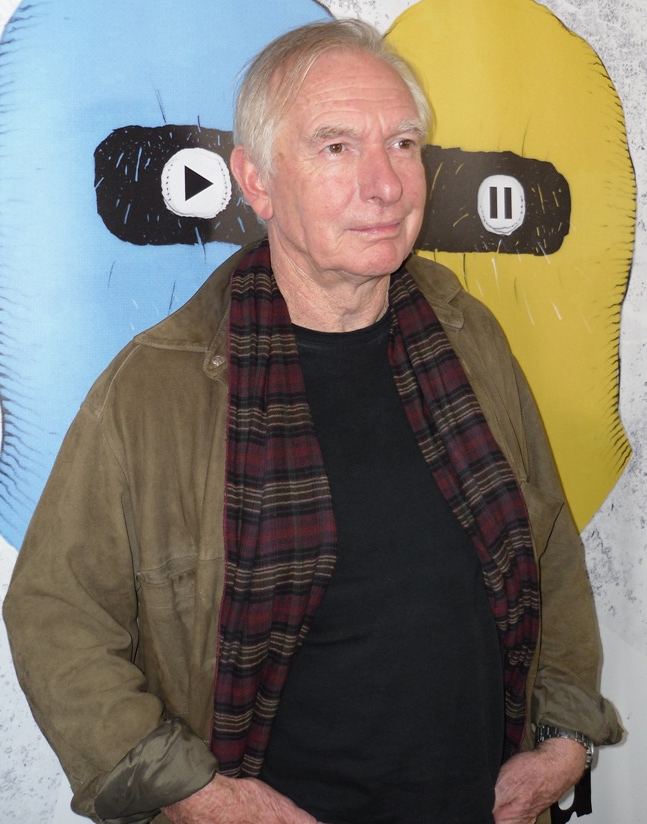
Peter Weir, Best Director winner

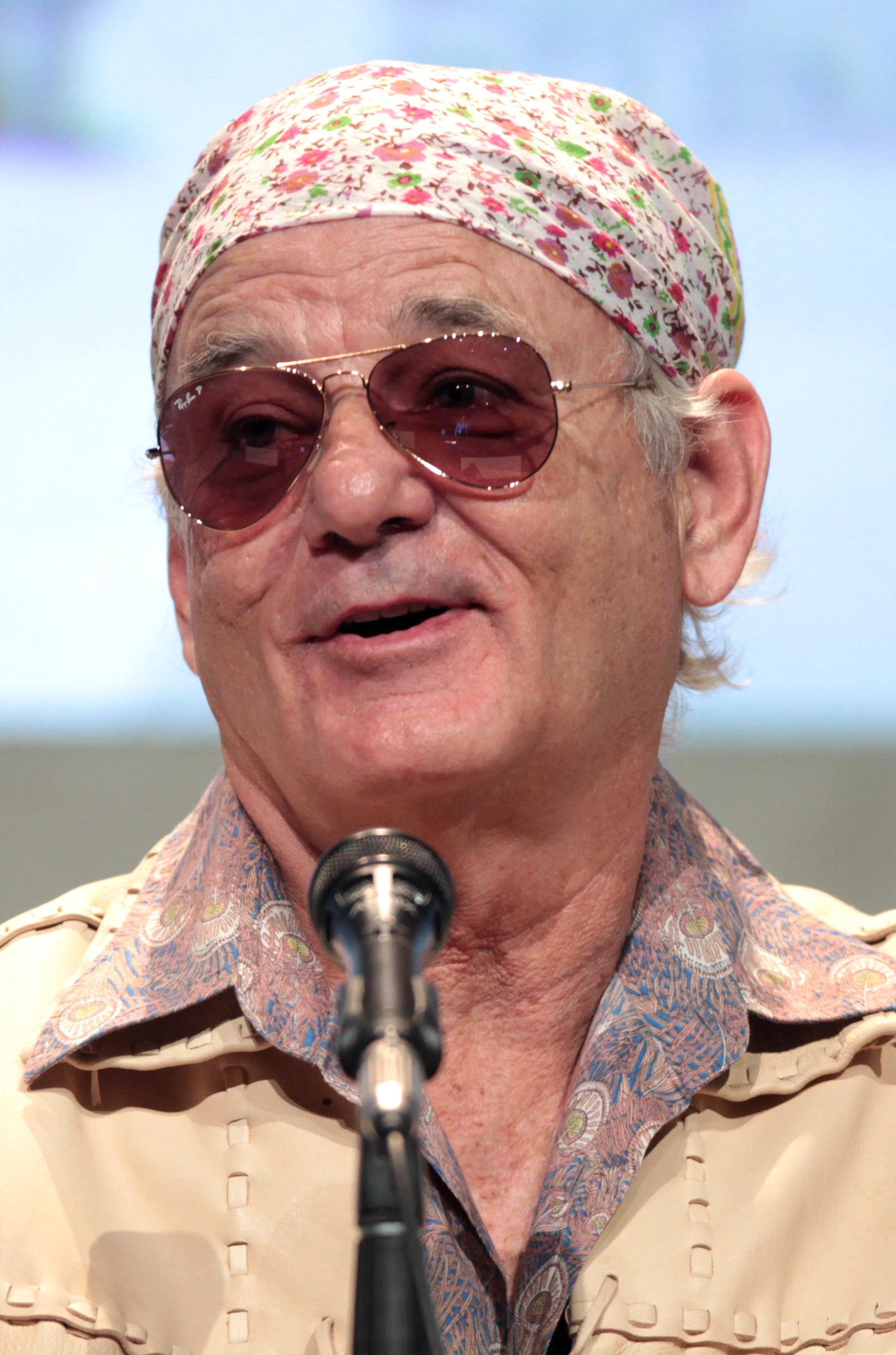
Bill Murray, Best Actor winner

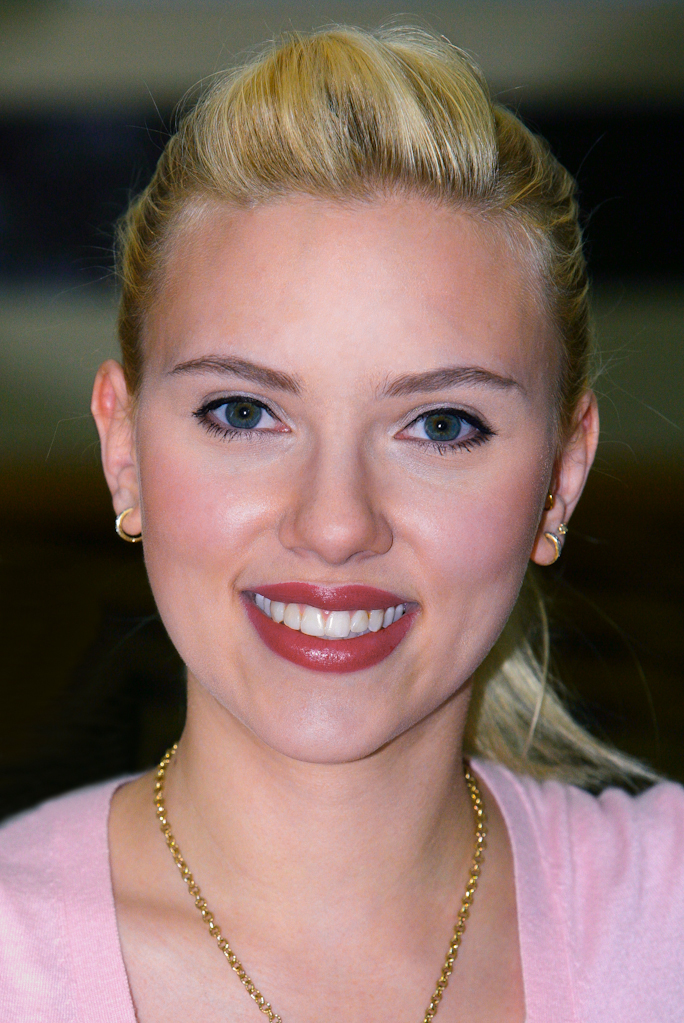
Scarlett Johansson, Best Actress winner

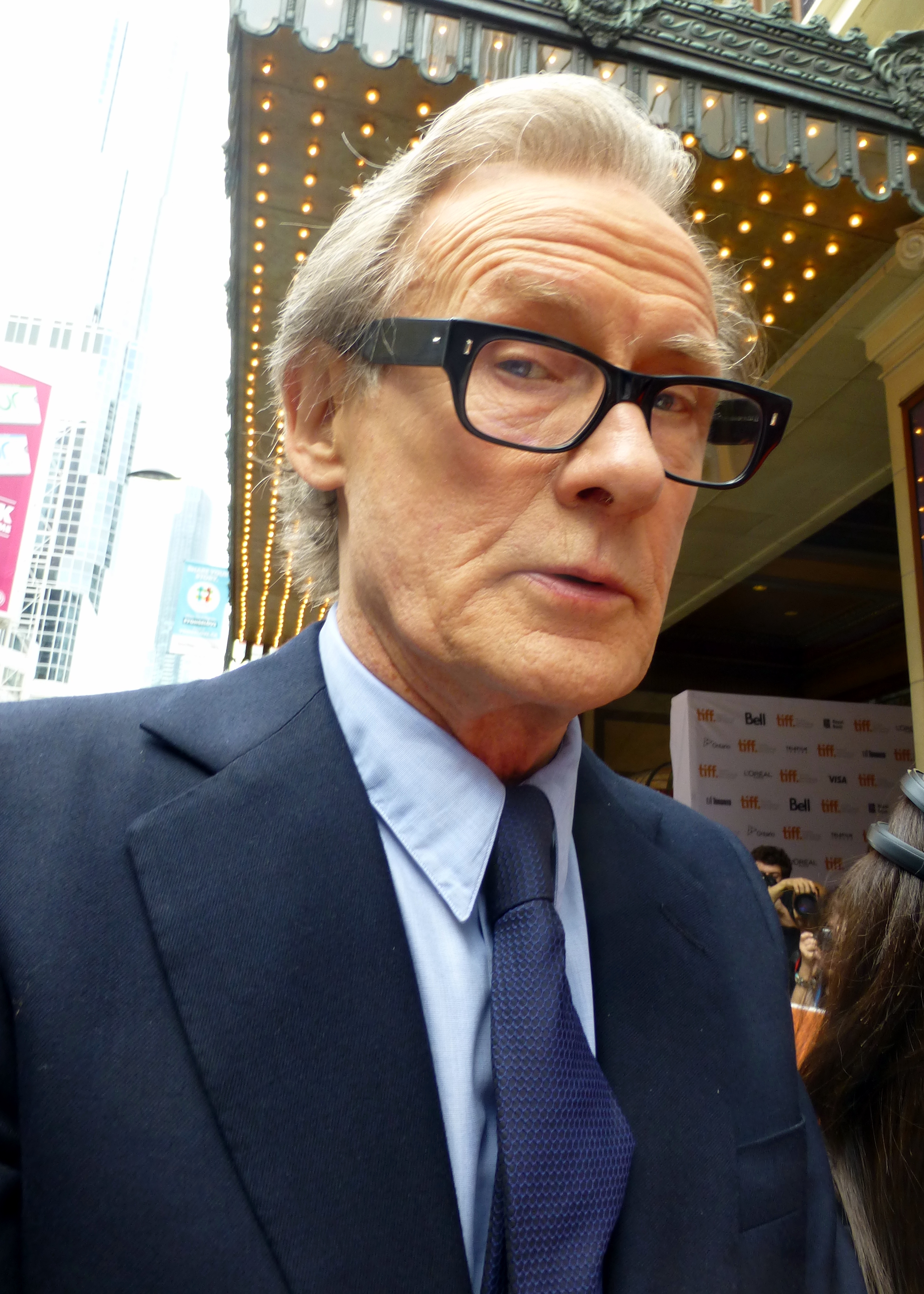
Bill Nighy, Best Supporting Actor winner

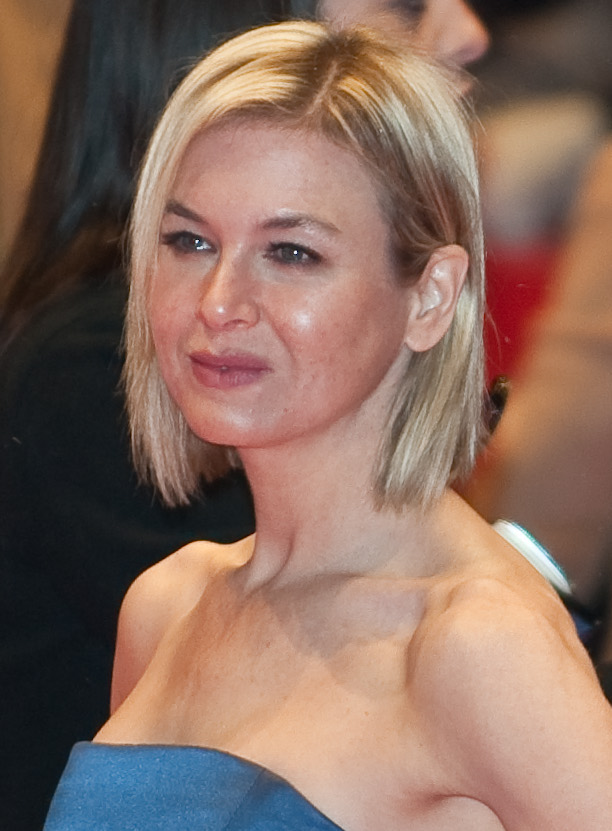
Renée Zellweger, Best Supporting Actress winner

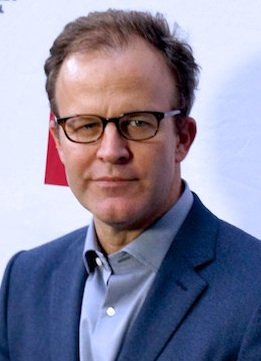
Tom McCarthy, Best Original Screenplay winner

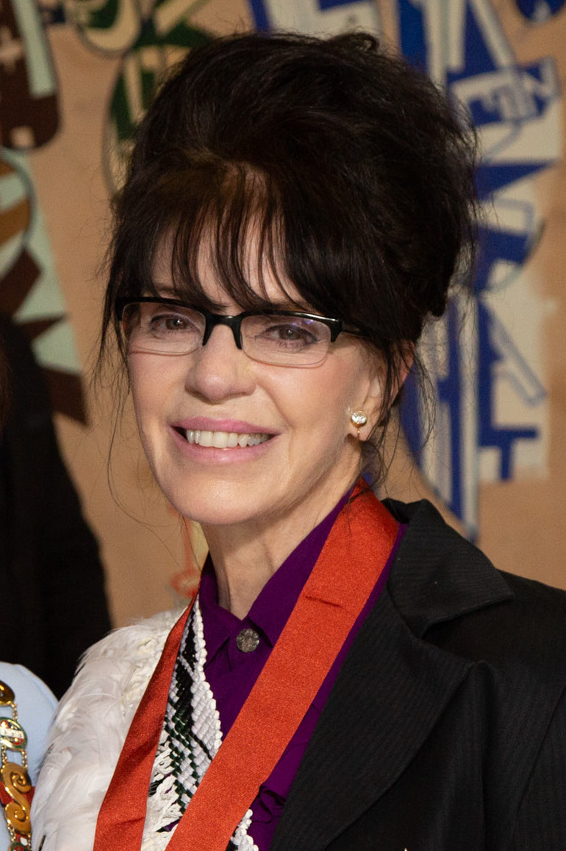
Fran Walsh, Best Adapted Screenplay co-winner

=== BAFTA Fellowship ===
- **John Boorman** and **Roger Graef**

=== Outstanding British Contribution to Cinema ===
- **Working Title Films**

=== Awards ===
Winners are listed first and highlighted in boldface.

**Best Film**: **The Lord of the Rings: The Return of the King – Barrie M. Osborne, Fran Walsh and Peter Jackson**; Big Fish – Bruce Cohen, Dan Jinks and Richard D. Zanuck; Cold Mountain – Sydney Pollack, William Horberg, Albert Berger and Ron Yerxa; Lost in Translation – Sofia Coppola and Ross Katz; Master and Commander: The Far Side of the World – Samuel Goldwyn Jr., Peter Weir and Duncan Henderson	**Best Direction**: **Peter Weir – Master and Commander: The Far Side of the World**; Tim Burton – Big Fish; Sofia Coppola – Lost in Translation; Peter Jackson – The Lord of the Rings: The Return of the King; Anthony Minghella – Cold Mountain
**Best Actor in a Leading Role**: **Bill Murray – Lost in Translation as Bob Harris**; Benicio del Toro – 21 Grams as Jack Jordan; Johnny Depp – Pirates of the Caribbean: The Curse of the Black Pearl as Captain Jack Sparrow; Jude Law – Cold Mountain as W. P. Inman; Sean Penn – 21 Grams as Paul Rivers; Sean Penn – Mystic River as Jimmy Markum	**Best Actress in a Leading Role**: **Scarlett Johansson – Lost in Translation as Charlotte**; Scarlett Johansson – Girl with a Pearl Earring as Griet; Anne Reid – The Mother as May; Uma Thurman – Kill Bill: Volume 1 as The Bride; Naomi Watts – 21 Grams as Cristina Peck
**Best Actor in a Supporting Role**: **Bill Nighy – Love Actually as Billy Mack**; Paul Bettany – Master and Commander: The Far Side of the World as Stephen Maturin; Albert Finney – Big Fish as Edward Bloom; Ian McKellen – The Lord of the Rings: The Return of the King as Gandalf; Tim Robbins – Mystic River as Dave Boyle	**Best Actress in a Supporting Role**: **Renée Zellweger – Cold Mountain as Ruby Thewes**; Holly Hunter – Thirteen as Melanie Freeland; Laura Linney – Mystic River as Annabeth Markum; Judy Parfitt – Girl with a Pearl Earring as Maria Thins; Emma Thompson – Love Actually as Karen
**Best Original Screenplay**: **The Station Agent – Tom McCarthy**; 21 Grams – Guillermo Arriaga; The Barbarian Invasions – Denys Arcand; Finding Nemo – Andrew Stanton, Bob Peterson and David Reynolds; Lost in Translation – Sofia Coppola	**Best Adapted Screenplay**: **The Lord of the Rings: The Return of the King – Fran Walsh, Philippa Boyens and Peter Jackson**; Big Fish – John August; Cold Mountain – Anthony Minghella; Girl with a Pearl Earring – Olivia Hetreed; Mystic River – Brian Helgeland
**Best Cinematography**: **The Lord of the Rings: The Return of the King – Andrew Lesnie**; Cold Mountain – John Seale; Girl with a Pearl Earring – Eduardo Serra; Lost in Translation – Lance Acord; Master and Commander: The Far Side of the World – Russell Boyd	**Best Costume Design**: **Master and Commander: The Far Side of the World – Wendy Stites**; Cold Mountain – Ann Roth and Carlo Poggioli; Girl with a Pearl Earring – Dien van Straalen; The Lord of the Rings: The Return of the King – Ngila Dickson and Richard Taylor; Pirates of the Caribbean: The Curse of the Black Pearl – Penny Rose
**Best Editing**: **Lost in Translation – Sarah Flack**; 21 Grams – Stephen Mirrione; Cold Mountain – Walter Murch; Kill Bill: Volume 1 – Sally Menke; The Lord of the Rings: The Return of the King – Jamie Selkirk	**Best Makeup and Hair**: **Pirates of the Caribbean: The Curse of the Black Pearl – Ve Neill and Martin Samuel**; Big Fish – Jean Ann Black and Paul LeBlanc; Cold Mountain – Paul Engelen and Ivana Primorac; Girl with a Pearl Earring – Jenny Shircore; The Lord of the Rings: The Return of the King – Richard Taylor, Peter King and Peter Owen
**Best Original Music**: **Cold Mountain – Gabriel Yared and T Bone Burnett**; Girl with a Pearl Earring – Alexandre Desplat; Kill Bill: Volume 1 – The RZA; The Lord of the Rings: The Return of the King – Howard Shore; Lost in Translation – Kevin Shields and Brian Reitzell	**Best Production Design**: **Master and Commander: The Far Side of the World – William Sandell**; Big Fish – Dennis Gassner; Cold Mountain – Dante Ferretti; Girl with a Pearl Earring – Ben Van Os; The Lord of the Rings: The Return of the King – Grant Major
**Best Sound**: **Master and Commander: The Far Side of the World – Richard King, Doug Hemphill, Paul Massey and Art Rochester**; Cold Mountain – Eddy Joseph, Ivan Sharrock, Walter Murch, Mike Prestwood Smith and Matthew Gough; Kill Bill: Volume 1 – Michael Minkler, Myron Nettinga, Wylie Stateman and Mark Ulano; The Lord of the Rings: The Return of the King – Ethan Van der Ryn, Mike Hopkins, David Farmer, Christopher Boyes, Michael Hedges, Michael Semanick and Hammond Peek; Pirates of the Caribbean: The Curse of the Black Pearl – Christopher Boyes, George Watters II, Lee Orloff, David Parker and David E. Campbell	**Best Special Visual Effects**: **The Lord of the Rings: The Return of the King – Joe Letteri, Jim Rygiel, Randall William Cook and Alex Funke**; Big Fish – Kevin Mack, Seth Maury, Lindsay MacGowan and Paddy Eason; Kill Bill: Volume 1 – Tommy Tom, Tam Kia Kwan, Leung Wai Kit and Jaco Wong Hin Leung; Master and Commander: The Far Side of the World – Stefen Fangmeier, Nathan McGuinness, Robert Stromberg and Dan Sudick; Pirates of the Caribbean: The Curse of the Black Pearl – John Knoll, Hal Hickel, Terry Frazee and Charles Gibson
**Outstanding British Film**: **Touching the Void – John Smithson and Kevin Macdonald**; Cold Mountain – Sydney Pollack, William Horberg, Albert Berger, Ron Yerxa and Anthony Minghella; Girl with a Pearl Earring – Andy Paterson, Anand Tucker and Peter Webber; In This World – Andrew Eaton, Anita Overland and Michael Winterbottom; Love Actually – Duncan Kenworthy, Tim Bevan, Eric Fellner and Richard Curtis	**Outstanding Debut by a British Writer, Director or Producer**: **Kiss of Life – Emily Young (Writer/Director)**; American Cousins – Sergio Casci (Writer); Girl with a Pearl Earring – Peter Webber (Director); To Kill a King – Jenny Mayhew (Writer)
**Best Short Animation**: **Jo Jo in the Stars – Sue Goffe and Marc Craste**; Dad's Dead – Maria Manton and Chris Shepherd; Dear Sweet Emma – John Cernok; Nibbles – Ron Diamond and Christopher Hinton; Plumber – Randi Yaffa, Andy Knight and Richard Rosenman	**Best Short Film**: **Brown Paper Bag – Natasha Carlish, Mark Leveson, Michael Baig Clifford and Geoff Thompson**; Bye-Child – Andrew Bonner and Bernard MacLaverty; Nits – George Isaac and Harry Wootliff; Sea Monsters – Matt Delargy, Mark Walker and Raphael Smith; Talking with Angels – Michael Knowles, Janey de Nordwall and Yousaf Ali Khan
**Best Film Not in the English Language**: **In This World – Andrew Eaton, Anita Overland and Michael Winterbottom**; The Barbarian Invasions – Denise Robert, Daniel Louis and Denys Arcand; Good Bye, Lenin! – Stefan Arndt and Wolfgang Becker; Spirited Away – Toshio Suzuki and Hayao Miyazaki; To Be and to Have – Gilles Sandoz and Nicolas Philibert; The Triplets of Belleville – Didier Brunner and Sylvain Chomet

== Statistics ==
Films that received multiple nominations
Nominations	Film
13	Cold Mountain
12	The Lord of the Rings: The Return of the King
10	Girl with a Pearl Earring
8	Lost in Translation
8	Master and Commander: The Far Side of the World
7	Big Fish
5	21 Grams
5	Kill Bill: Volume 1
5	Pirates of the Caribbean: The Curse of the Black Pearl
4	Mystic River
3	Love Actually
2	The Barbarian Invasions
2	In This World

Films that received multiple awards
Awards	Film
4	The Lord of the Rings: The Return of the King
4	Master and Commander: The Far Side of the World
3	Lost in Translation
2	Cold Mountain

== See also ==
- 76th Academy Awards
- 29th César Awards
- 9th Critics' Choice Awards
- 56th Directors Guild of America Awards
- 17th European Film Awards
- 61st Golden Globe Awards
- 24th Golden Raspberry Awards
- 8th Golden Satellite Awards
- 18th Goya Awards
- 19th Independent Spirit Awards
- 9th Lumière Awards
- 15th Producers Guild of America Awards
- 30th Saturn Awards
- 10th Screen Actors Guild Awards
- 56th Writers Guild of America Awards
