= Jude (film) =

1996 British film by Michael Winterbottom

- Directed by: Michael Winterbottom
- Screenplay by: Hossein Amini
- Based on: Jude the Obscure by Thomas Hardy
- Produced by: Andrew Eaton
- Starring: Christopher Eccleston; Kate Winslet; Liam Cunningham; Rachel Griffiths; June Whitfield
- Cinematography: Eduardo Serra
- Edited by: Trevor Waite
- Music by: Adrian Johnston
- Production companies: Gramercy Pictures; BBC Films; Revolution Films
- Distributed by: PolyGram Filmed Entertainment
- Release dates: 10 September 1996 (Toronto International Film Festival); 4 October 1996 (United Kingdom)
- Running time: 123 minutes
- Country: United Kingdom
- Language: English
- Box office: $409,144

Jude is a 1996 British period drama film directed by Michael Winterbottom, and written by Hossein Amini, based on Thomas Hardy's 1895 novel Jude the Obscure. The original music score was composed by Adrian Johnston.

The film was shot in late 1995 in Edinburgh and locations in County Durham including Durham Cathedral, Durham City, Ushaw College, Blanchland village and Beamish museum.

In a 2011 interview for theartsdesk, lead actor Christopher Eccleston commented on the film: "Of all the films I've done, Jude is the one that I'd stand by, the one I'd like people to come back to. The rest is much of a muchness."

== Plot ==
In the Victorian period, Jude Fawley is a bright young working-class man who dreams of a university education. Circumstances conspire against him, and he is forced into a job as a stonemason and an unhappy marriage to a country girl, Arabella. He remains true to his dream and, months later, after his wife's sudden departure, he heads for the city. He thinks education is available for any man who is willing to work hard. However, he is rejected by the university based primarily on his lower-class status. During this period, he encounters his cousin, Sue Bridehead, who is beautiful and intelligent, and shares his disdain for convention. Whilst Jude is enraptured by Sue, and vice versa, she marries Jude's former school teacher, Phillotson, after Jude tells her he is married to Arabella.

The marriage of Sue and Phillotson is not a success, as she refuses to give herself sexually or romantically to her husband. She leaves Phillotson to join Jude in what turns out to be a rough life, moving from place to place as Jude picks up occasional work as a stonemason. Jude learns that Arabella bore a son, whom she named Jude ("Juey") soon after she left Jude. The boy comes to live with his father Jude, and Sue. Sue gives birth to two children. Agnostic and independent, she refuses to legalise their arrangement by marriage.

Sue and Jude are forbidden a permanent rental lodging because their living arrangement without marriage is considered scandalous. Sue tells Juey that the family cannot stay long at their present lodging because there are too many of them. The next day Sue and Jude return to their lodging to find that Juey has killed his half-siblings and committed suicide, hanging himself. His suicide note says the reason: "Becos we were to menny."

Each of the couple falls into a deep depression after the deaths of their children. Turning to the religion she previously rejected, Sue comes to believe that God has judged and punished the couple for not having married. She decides to return to Phillotson, although she finds him sexually repugnant, as he is her true husband in the eyes of God.

A year after the death of their children, Jude and Sue happen to meet when separately visiting the tombstones of their children. They both look worse for wear. Jude demands that Sue tell him whether she still loves him, to which she replies, "You've always known". After a passionate kiss, she walks away from Jude to return to Phillotson.

As Sue walks away, Jude shouts to her, "We are man and wife, if ever two people were on this earth!"

== Cast ==
- Christopher Eccleston as Jude Fawley
- Kate Winslet as Sue Bridehead
- Liam Cunningham as Phillotson
- Rachel Griffiths as Arabella
- June Whitfield as Aunt Drusilla
- Berwick Kaler as Farmer Troutham
- David Tennant as drunk undergraduate
- Kerry Shale as Showman
- Paul Copley as Mr Willis
- James Nesbitt as Uncle Joe
- Paul Bown as Uncle Jim
- Lee Joseph Sammut as Stonemason
- Lorraine Hilton as shopkeeper

== Filming locations ==
The production filmed in a variety of countries including France, New Zealand and the UK. The Kent and East Sussex Railway was used as a film location for the scenes where Jude (Christopher Eccleston) and Sue (Kate Winslet) are on a train which was intercut with scenery from the North of England.

== Reception ==
It holds an 81% rating on Rotten Tomatoes, based on 42 reviews, with an average rating of 7.3/10. The consensus summarizes: "Superb acting from a beautifully matched Christopher Eccleston and Kate Winslet make Jude well worth watching even as it struggles with its source material." On Metacritic, the film has a score of 68 out of 100 based on 18 critics, indicating "generally favorable reviews".
