= In This World =

- Directed by: Michael Winterbottom
- Written by: Tony Grisoni
- Produced by: Andrew Eaton; Anita Overland
- Starring: Jamal Udin Torabi; Enayatullah; Nabil Elouahabi
- Narrated by: Paul Popplewell
- Music by: Dario Marianelli
- Production companies: BBC Films; UK Film Council; The Works; Revolution Films; The Film Consortium
- Distributed by: BBC
- Release dates: 17 November 2002 (London); 28 March 2003 (United Kingdom)
- Running time: 88 minutes
- Country: United Kingdom
- Languages: Dari; Pashto; Italian; English
- Budget: UK£950,000

In This World is a 2002 British docudrama directed by Michael Winterbottom. The film follows two young Afghan refugees, Jamal Udin Torabi and Enayatullah, as they leave a refugee camp in Pakistan for a better life in London. Since their journey is illegal, it is fraught with danger, and they must use back-channels, bribes, and smugglers to achieve their goal.

The film won the Golden Bear prize at the 2003 Berlin International Film Festival and BAFTA Award for Best Film Not in the English Language at the 57th British Academy Film Awards; it was also nominated for Alexander Korda Award for Best British Film but lost to Touching the Void (directed by Kevin Macdonald).

== Plot ==
Jamal and Enayatullah are Afghan refugees in a camp in Peshawar, Pakistan. They travel to Quetta, and thence to Taftan on the Iranian border. They pay people smugglers to assist them over the border; on their first attempt they are stopped by Iranian police and returned to Pakistan, but their second attempt is successful. They travel to Tehran and then to Maku, in the Kurdish part of Iran, from where they cross a mountain range on foot to Turkey. In Istanbul they meet a group of other migrants, and they are taken to Italy inside a shipping container. The container is not ventilated, and most of the refugees, including Enayatullah, are suffocated to death. Jamal survives and lives in Italy for a time. He then steals a woman's purse and buys a rail ticket to Paris. From there, he goes to the Sangatte asylum seekers camp and with a new friend, Yusef, he crosses the English Channel by stowing away on a lorry. Finally, he arrives in London, where he calls his uncle to say he has arrived but that Enyatullah is "not in this world". The film ends with images of the Peshawar refugees.

== Production and style ==
The film is shot in a documentary style but it is in fact a drama performed by non-professional actors and with improvised dialogue. The actors are mostly playing fictionalised versions of themselves; for example, Jamal is a real Afghan refugee and the Iranian policeman who deports the two refugees back to Pakistan is played by a real policeman who is re-enacting his normal work for the camera. Enayatullah was a market trader whom the filmmakers cast because they thought him "a nice guy". The production team lied to authorities in several countries in order to secure filming rights, having met government resistance in Iran and Pakistan. Most of the film was shot on location, but the scenes inside the Sangatte camp were actually filmed in England, as the film crew received hostility from the French inhabitants of the nearby village.

== Distribution ==
The film was released in the UK in March 2003 by the BBC after festival screenings in 2002. It was released in the United States in a limited number of cities in September 2003 by Lions Gate as part of the short-lived Sundance Film Series partnership experiment with Loews Cineplex Entertainment. The film did not make much money, but was highly regarded by the critics that were able to see it. The film holds an 89% on Rotten Tomatoes.

== Aftermath ==
In a case of life imitating art, after returning to Pakistan, Jamal Udin Torabi made the journey to London in reality and applied for asylum. He lived with a family in South East London, although he was only granted leave to remain in the UK until his eighteenth birthday. Enayatullah used the money he earned on the film to buy a truck, and now runs an import-export business between Kabul and Peshawar.
