= The Killer Inside Me (1976 film) =

1976 film by Burt Kennedy

- Theatrical poster
- Directed by: Burt Kennedy
- Written by: Edward Mann; Robert Chamblee
- Based on: The Killer Inside Me by Jim Thompson
- Produced by: Michael W. Leighton
- Starring: Stacy Keach; Susan Tyrrell; Tisha Sterling
- Cinematography: William A. Fraker
- Edited by: Danford B. Greene; Aaron Stell
- Music by: Tim McIntire; John Rubinstein
- Distributed by: Warner Bros. Pictures
- Release date: October 1976
- Running time: 99 minutes
- Country: United States
- Language: English

The Killer Inside Me is a 1976 American neo-noir crime drama film directed by Burt Kennedy and based on Jim Thompson's novel of the same name. In this adaptation, the action was shifted from the west Texas oilfields to a Montana mining town, and several other changes were made. It stars Stacy Keach, Susan Tyrrell, and Tisha Sterling.

A 2010 remake was directed by Michael Winterbottom.

== Plot ==
Beneath his likable exterior, Lou Ford, a deputy in a small Montana town, is a sadistic sociopath with violent sexual tastes. When Lou gets involved with a local prostitute's blackmail schemes, the carefully crafted facade he maintains begins to unravel into a killing spree.

== Cast ==
- Stacy Keach as Lou Ford
- Susan Tyrrell as Joyce Lakeland
- Tisha Sterling as Amy Stanton
- Keenan Wynn as Chester Conway
- Don Stroud as Elmer
- Charles McGraw as Howard Hendricks
- John Dehner as Bob Maples
- Pepe Serna as Johnny Lopez
- John Carradine as Dr. Jason Smith
- Royal Dano as Father
- Julie Adams as Mother

== Remake ==
Michael Winterbottom directed a 2010 remake of the film starring Casey Affleck as Lou Ford, Jessica Alba as Joyce Lakeland, and Kate Hudson as Amy Stanton. The 2010 version contains more details about the history of Ford and his brother as well as a somewhat different ending.
