= Alison Chernick =

American film director

Alison Chernick is a Grammy-nominated New York City-based writer, director and filmmaker. She is a voting member of AMPAS, The Academy of Motion Picture Arts and Sciences.

== Biography ==
Chernick's first documentary was on contemporary artist Jeff Koons, titled The Jeff Koons Show (2004). Her second documentary titled Matthew Barney: No Restraint, on artist Matthew Barney's creation of the piece Drawing Restraint 9, premiered at the Berlin Film Festival in 2006 and was released by IFC First Take. In 2006, she founded her own production company, Voyeur Films.

She directed a film on Roy Lichtenstein to accompany the Tate Modern exhibition Lichtenstein: A Retrospective in 2013, titled Roy Lichtenstein – Diagram of an Artist. Her short 12-minute film on fashion designer Martin Margiela titled The Artist is Absent premiered at the Tribeca Film Festival in 2015. Her feature documentary, on violinist Itzhak Perlman, titled Itzhak was nominated for numerous awards including the 2019 Grammy Award for Best Music Film. It was the opening night film at the Hamptons International Film Festival in 2017 and received a worldwide theatrical release in 2018 followed by a PBS American Masters broadcast release. A short film commissioned by The National Gallery of Australia titled Jackson Pollock: Blue Poles was released in 2019.

Chernick is the recipient of a National Endowment for The Humanities award, a New York Women in Film and Television award, a Loreen Arbus grant and a Woman of Her Word grant. She was invited to judge for the National Endowment for The Humanities in 2018.

Chernick's documentaries have been screened at various museums around the world, including the five Guggenheims, the Smithsonian, SFMOMA, and the Walker. She has written for the Sundance Channel, Showtime, SyFy, MTV, VH1, The History Channel, and National Geographic. Her commissioned short films often center around themes of art, fashion, music, gastronomy, and health. Chernick is represented by RSA (Ridley Scott Associates).
