= Revolution Films =

British film production company

Revolution Film
- Type: Private
- Industry: Motion picture
- Founded: 1994; 32 years ago
- Founders: Michael Winterbottom; Andrew Eaton
- Headquarters: London, UK
- Services: Film production; television production
- Owner: Michael Winterbottom

Revolution Films is a British film production company, founded by producer Andrew Eaton and director Michael Winterbottom. They have produced a number of film and television productions since 1994, including Jude (1996), 24 Hour Party People (2002), 9 Songs (2004), Rush (2013) and The Trip (2010).

== Filmography ==
- Shoshana (2023, directed by Michael Winterbottom)
- Eleven Days in May (2022, directed by Michael Winterbottom and Mohammed Sawwaf)
- This England (2022, directed by Julian Jarrold)
- Isolation (2021, directed by Michael Winterbottom)
- The Trip to Greece (2020, directed by Michael Winterbottom)
- Greed (2019, directed by Michael Winterbottom)
- The Trip to Spain (2017, directed by Michael Winterbottom)
- On the Road (2016, directed by Michael Winterbottom)
- The Emperor's New Clothes (2015, directed by Michael Winterbottom)
- The Face of an Angel (2014, directed by Michael Winterbottom)
- The Trip to Italy (2014, directed by Michael Winterbottom)
- Rush (2013, directed by Ron Howard)
- The Look of Love (2013, directed by Michael Winterbottom)
- 360 (2011, directed by Fernando Meirelles)
- The Killer Inside Me (2010, directed by Michael Winterbottom)
- Genova (2008, directed by Michael Winterbottom)
- A Mighty Heart (2007, directed by Michael Winterbottom)
- A Cock and Bull Story (2005, directed by Michael Winterbottom)
- 9 Songs (2004, directed by Michael Winterbottom)
- Bright Young Things (2003, directed by Stephen Fry)
- Code 46 (2003, directed by Michael Winterbottom)
- 24 Hour Party People (2002, directed by Michael Winterbottom)
- In This World (2002, directed by Michael Winterbottom)
- Jude (1996, directed by Michael Winterbottom)
