= Family (1994 TV series) =

- Created by: Roddy Doyle
- Directed by: Michael Winterbottom
- Country of origin: Ireland
- Original language: English
- No. of series: 1
- No. of episodes: 4

Production
- Producer: Andrew Eaton
- Running time: 45 minutes

Original release
- Network: BBC1/RTÉ One
- Release: 8 May – 29 May 1994

Family is a television drama mini-series that aired on RTÉ One and BBC1 in 1994. It was written by Roddy Doyle, the author of The Commitments, and directed by Michael Winterbottom.

== Premise ==
The show centres on the Spencers, a working-class family living in a vast Dublin housing estate. Charlo, played by Seán McGinley, is the abusive and cheating husband of Paula, played by Ger Ryan. They have four children, teenagers John Paul and Nicola, and younger children Leanne and Jack.

There were four episodes, each focusing on a member of the family. Most of the 'on location' filming took place in Ballymun, on the Northside of Dublin.

Charlo

The first episode focuses on Charlo, a small-time crook who is also an alcoholic, abusive father and husband.

John Paul

The second episode focuses on the rebellious teenage son. Named after Pope John Paul II due to his 1979 visit to Ireland, John Paul has just started secondary school.

Nicola

The third episode focuses on Nicola, in her late teens, who works in a clothing factory and has a strained relationship with her father, particularly in relation to her burgeoning sexuality.

Paula

The final episode focuses on Paula, the emotionally and physically battered mother, who attempts to reclaim her identity and her life without her husband.

== Broadcast ==
The series was broadcast in Ireland on RTÉ One. It aired in the United Kingdom on BBC1. The series was a co-production by both public broadcasters RTÉ Television and BBC. The series also aired in Sweden, as well as Canada and Australia.

== Video release ==
The series was released on video for the first time ever on 27 June 2011 as a 2-disc DVD set in the UK & Ireland. Edits were made for contractual reasons. The release included a thirty-minute contemporary interview with director Michael Winterbottom, writer Roddy Doyle and producer Andrew Eaton.
