= The Wedding Guest (2018 film) =

Film by Michael Winterbottom

- Theatrical release poster
- Directed by: Michael Winterbottom
- Screenplay by: Michael Winterbottom
- Produced by: Dev Patel; Michael Winterbottom; Deepak Nayar; Nik Bower; Melissa Parmenter; Ramana Rudrapati
- Starring: Dev Patel; Radhika Apte; Jim Sarbh
- Cinematography: Giles Nuttgens
- Edited by: Marc Richardson
- Music by: Harry Escott
- Production companies: Ingenious Media; Riverstone Pictures; Stage 6 Films; Revolution Films
- Distributed by: IFC Films (United States); Park Circus (United Kingdom)
- Release dates: 8 September 2018 (Toronto); 1 March 2019 (United States)
- Running time: 96 minutes
- Countries: United Kingdom; United States
- Language: English
- Box office: $386,166

The Wedding Guest is a 2018 action thriller film written and directed by Michael Winterbottom. It stars Dev Patel, Radhika Apte and Jim Sarbh.

It had its world premiere at the Toronto International Film Festival on 8 September 2018. It was released in the United States on 1 March 2019, by IFC Films.

== Plot ==
Jay, a young British man, packs a stash of passports and arrives in Pakistan, travelling to Younganabad. Despite only speaking English, he carries out a careful plan, sneaks inside a home prepared for a wedding, and kidnaps the bride, Samira, shooting dead an armed guard who attempts to intervene.

Jay offers Samira a choice: return to her family and arranged marriage, or continue to Lahore and join her boyfriend Deepesh, who hired Jay to rescue her for £15,000. Unwilling to be married, Samira chooses the latter. They cross the border into India with fake passports and drive to Amritsar, where Deepesh fails to meet them as planned. Jay purchases phones and SIM cards and reaches Deepesh, who says that he will be in India the following day.

Taking a train to Delhi, Jay meets with Deepesh and demands his payment. Media attention on the kidnapping and the guard's death have changed Deepesh's mind, and he offers Jay a further £20,000 to abandon Samira back in Pakistan. Jay informs her and she reveals that they had planned to live off of diamonds Deepesh had stolen from his family's business.

Meeting in Jaipur, Deepesh gives Jay half of the money, promising to have the rest the next day. In the morning, he drives the two to a hotel and refuses to stop the car when Samira asks to speak in private. Jay pulls out his gun, forcing him to pull over and give him the remaining money. Arguing with Samira, Deepesh hits her, and Jay drags him out of the car. Deepesh warns him not to trust Samira, but Jay demands the diamonds, and beats Deepesh to death after he attacks Jay with a rock.

Unsure whether to trust each other, Jay and Samira agree to split the diamonds and go their separate ways. She finds the diamonds hidden in Deepesh's shoe, and Jay burns the body. They check into the hotel using Deepesh's passport, and Samira sews the diamonds into the hem of her dress. Jay's contacts lead him to a fence who provides them with fake identities and a buyer for the jewels. The jeweler refuses to handle the sale after appraising one of the stones at over $100,000.

In Goa, Jay and Samira rent a house on the beach and give in to their mutual attraction. Samira asks him for his real name; he replies “Aasif” but she knows this is not true. She later slips away with her fake documents and most of the money, and he awakens in the morning to find her gone. She calls to apologize, saying that while he can go home, she never can. Jay tells her to call if she ever needs anything as she rides a bus toward her new life.

== Cast ==
- Dev Patel as Jay
- Radhika Apte as Samira
- Jim Sarbh as Deepesh

In addition, Harish Khanna plays Nitin, who provides Jay with forged documents in Jaipur.

== Production ==
In November 2017, it was announced Dev Patel had joined the cast of the film, with Michael Winterbottom directing from a screenplay he wrote.

== Release ==
It had its world premiere at the Toronto International Film Festival on September 8, 2018. Shortly after, IFC Films acquired distribution rights to the film. It was released in the United States on March 1, 2019.

== Reception ==
On review aggregator website Rotten Tomatoes, the film has an approval rating of 44% based on 73 reviews, with an average rating of 5.6/10. The website's critical consensus reads, "The Wedding Guest makes a compelling argument for Dev Patel as an actor worthy of diverse leading roles, even if the movie's less than the sum of its action thriller parts." On Metacritic, it has a weighted average score of 57 out of 100 based on 25 critics, indicating "mixed or average reviews".
