= The Look of Love (film) =

- Theatrical release poster
- Directed by: Michael Winterbottom
- Written by: Matt Greenhalgh
- Based on: Members Only: The Life and Times of Paul Raymond by Paul Willetts
- Produced by: Melissa Parmenter; Peter Hampden; Robin Guise; Peter Raven
- Starring: Steve Coogan; Imogen Poots; Anna Friel; Tamsin Egerton
- Cinematography: Hubert Taczanowski
- Edited by: Mags Arnold
- Music by: Antony Genn; Martin Slattery
- Production companies: Film4; Baby Cow Productions; Revolution Films; Anton Capital Entertainment; Lipsync Productions
- Distributed by: StudioCanal
- Release date: 26 April 2013
- Running time: 101 minutes
- Country: United Kingdom
- Language: English
- Box office: $603,119

The Look of Love is a 2013 British biopic of Paul Raymond, directed by Michael Winterbottom. It stars Steve Coogan as Raymond. The film was released in the United Kingdom on 26 April 2013.

== Plot ==
The story opens in London in 1992. Paul Raymond returns to his flat, after attending the funeral of his daughter, Debbie. He plays a videotape of a television programme that he and Debbie took part in, and reflects on their lives.

In a flashback to the end of the 1950s, Raymond is an impresario on the seaside variety show circuit, where he is making a name for himself by adding semi-nude women to his stage acts. After a lion attacks the show's dancers, his wife Jean joins the show. When the Daily Sketch claims that Jean performed nude, Raymond sues the newspaper. His lawsuit is unsuccessful, but he appreciates the ensuing publicity, and subsequently launches a strip club in London, the Raymond Revuebar. Its success allows him to expand his property empire, and also to indulge in a playboy lifestyle, which his wife tolerates.

At the beginning of the 1970s, Raymond moves into theatrical revues, and casts aspiring actress Amber St. George in a nude revue. Raymond moves in with her, and his marriage to Jean ends. Raymond also agrees to meet a grown son, Derry, whom he had fathered out of wedlock. They have an awkward dinner together, but he then cuts Derry out of his life.

Raymond approaches Tony Power, a young man in his 20s, to run a new men's magazine, Men Only. Power is drawn into a sleazy and corrupt world, ultimately leading to his untimely death. The magazine is a huge success, thanks in part thanks to St. George's role (under the pseudonym Fiona Richmond) as a roving "sex reporter". Raymond continues to enjoy a hedonistic, coke-fuelled lifestyle. This becomes too much for St. George, and their relationship ends.

Raymond's daughter Debbie is introduced. Raymond tries to make her a star in his theatrical ventures, but she lacks talent, and the show is a failure. Debbie marries musician Jonathan Hodge. Jean returns for the wedding, and volunteers to pose nude for Raymond's magazine. In the delivery room, Debbie gives birth to a girl, after sniffing a line of coke that Raymond has provided. She dies in 1992, of a heroin overdose. Following the funeral, Raymond returns home with his granddaughter, pointing out the property he owns that will someday belong to her. An epilogue reports that, in December 1992, he was the richest man in Britain.

== Cast ==
- Steve Coogan as Paul Raymond
- Imogen Poots as Debbie Raymond
- Anna Friel as Jean Raymond
- Tamsin Egerton as Amber St. George, aka Fiona Richmond
- David Walliams as Vicar Edwyn Young
- Chris Addison as Tony Power
- Shirley Henderson as Rusty Humphries
- James Lance as Carl Snitcher
- Paul Popplewell as Journalist
- Sarah Solemani as Anna
- Vera Filatova as Monika
- Matthew Beard as Howard Raymond
- Simon Bird as Jonathan Hodge
- Kieran O'Brien as Jimmy Humphries
- Matt Lucas as Divine
- Stephen Fry as Barrister
- Miles Jupp as Interviewer
- Peter Wight as Police Inspector
- Liam Boyle as Derry

== Production history ==
The Look of Love was originally called The King of Soho, until that title had to be dropped due to a legal dispute.

== Critical response ==
On Rotten Tomatoes, the film has an approval rating of 54%, based on reviews from 74 critics, with an average score of 5.7 out of 10. The site's consensus reads: "While it may not add up to the definitive Paul Raymond biopic -- or take full advantage of Steve Coogan's many gifts -- The Look of Love still proves an entertainingly old fashioned look at the Swinging London of the 1960s." On Metacritic, it has a score of 57 out of 100, based on reviews from 20 critics, indicating "mixed or average reviews".

Dennis Harvey of Variety wrote: "Michael Winterbottom and Steve Coogan's fourth feature collaboration is a vivid period whirlwind, that impressively showcases the comic thesp's more dramatic side." Peter Bradshaw of The Guardian called it "a shallow, but watchable movie" and gave it three out of five stars.

When the film was released in the United Kingdom, it opened at #7, with £208,557.

Imogen Poots was featured on the inaugural longlist of the Guardian Film Awards, nominated for Best Supporting Actor, in January 2014.
