= The Killer Inside Me (2010 film) =

2010 US crime drama film by Michael Winterbottom

- Theatrical release poster
- Directed by: Michael Winterbottom
- Screenplay by: John Curran
- Based on: The Killer Inside Me by Jim Thompson
- Produced by: Bradford L. Schlei
- Starring: Casey Affleck; Kate Hudson; Jessica Alba; Ned Beatty; Elias Koteas; Tom Bower; Simon Baker; Bill Pullman
- Cinematography: Marcel Zyskind
- Edited by: Mags Arnold
- Music by: Melissa Parmenter; Joel Cadbury
- Production companies: Revolution Films; Hero Entertainment; Indion Entertainment Group
- Distributed by: IFC Films
- Release dates: January 24, 2010 (Sundance); June 18, 2010 (United States)
- Running time: 109 minutes
- Country: United States
- Language: English
- Budget: $13 million
- Box office: $3.9 million

The Killer Inside Me is a 2010 American crime drama and an adaptation of the 1952 novel by Jim Thompson. The film is directed by Michael Winterbottom and stars Casey Affleck, Jessica Alba, and Kate Hudson. It is the second film adaptation of Thompson's novel, the first being 1976's The Killer Inside Me, directed by Burt Kennedy.

At its release, the film was criticised for its graphic depiction of violence directed toward women.

== Plot ==
In 1952, Deputy Sheriff Lou Ford is a pillar of his small west Texas community; secretly, he is a sociopath with violent sexual tastes. Years before, Lou was caught raping a little girl by his adopted brother Mike, who pleaded guilty to the crime to protect Lou. Released from prison, Mike was hired by Chester Conway, and died in a construction "accident" Lou believes was staged by Conway.

At the request of Sheriff Bob Maples, Lou visits Joyce Lakeland, a prostitute who is having an affair with Conway's son, Elmer. When she continuously provokes him with slaps, Lou uses a belt to whip Joyce, who enjoys pain, and they begin their own affair. They devise a plot to extort $10,000 from Conway. Maples and Conway ask Lou to oversee the payoff, but Lou enacts his own plan: he brutally beats Joyce and, believing her dead, shoots and kills Elmer, planting the gun on Joyce. However, Joyce survives, and Conway intends to see her executed for Elmer's murder.

Lou's reputation begins to falter: his fiancée Amy suspects his infidelity, and county district attorney Howard Hendricks suspects Lou is the real killer. Lou accompanies Maples and Conway in taking Joyce to the hospital in Fort Worth so Conway can interrogate her. Lou waits in a hotel room during her surgery, and Maples tells him Joyce died on the operating table, which leaves Lou speechless.

Returning home, Lou discovers explicit photographs inside a Bible. The woman in the photographs was Helene, a housekeeper and babysitter from his youth who resembles Joyce. Lou recalls that Helene introduced him to sadomasochism, and burns the photos.

Hendricks arrests Johnnie Pappas, a local youth Lou had befriended, as a suspect in the murders. He is found with one of Conway's marked $20 bills, given to him by Lou. Hendricks asks Lou to persuade Johnnie to confess; in Johnnie's cell, Lou confesses to Johnnie that he is the killer, and hangs Johnnie to make it appear as though he committed suicide out of guilt.

Johnnie's death only makes the town more suspicious of Lou. Journalist and union organizer Joe Rothman, who had previously suggested that Conway had Mike killed, implies that he knows Lou is the killer. Lou proposes to Amy, and to sate his violent predilections, she allows him to spank her. An alcoholic bum, whom Lou had previously burnt with a cigar, has been trailing Lou and knows he is responsible for the murders. He demands $5,000 to keep quiet, to which Lou agrees. On the day Lou and Amy had planned to elope, Lou beats her to death; the bum sees her body and runs for help. Lou gives chase, shouting that the bum has murdered Amy, and another deputy, Jeff Plummer, shoots the bum dead.

The next morning, Plummer informs Lou that Sheriff Maples has committed suicide. Hendricks and Plummer try to get a confession from Lou, but he cockily refuses. They find a letter Amy intended to give Lou in which she begs him to come clean. Lou is arrested and sent to an insane asylum, where he suffers hallucinations of Amy and Helene. Attorney Billy Boy Walker, hired by Rothman, has Lou released. Lou tells Walker everything and concludes that he does not want anyone else to die.

Lost in violent fantasies, Lou douses his house in gasoline and alcohol, arms himself with a knife, and sits in his study to await retribution. The police arrive with Hendricks, Conway, Plummer and the still-alive Joyce. She tells Lou that she refused to cooperate with the authorities, Lou tells her he loves her, then stabs her in the stomach. Plummer opens fire which hits both Joyce and Lou and ignites the gasoline, killing them both. Outside, the approaching policemen watch as the house is engulfed in flames.

== Cast ==
- Casey Affleck as Lou Ford, a West Texas deputy sheriff.
- Jessica Alba as Joyce Lakeland, a prostitute.
- Kate Hudson as Amy Stanton, Ford's schoolteacher girlfriend.
- Ned Beatty as Chester Conway
- Tom Bower as Sheriff Bob Maples
- Elias Koteas as Joe Rothman
- Simon Baker as Howard Hendricks, a county attorney.
- Bill Pullman as Billy Boy Walker
- Brent Briscoe as Bum / The Stranger / Visitor
- Matthew Maher as Deputy Jeff Plummer
- Liam Aiken as Johnnie Pappas
- Jay R. Ferguson as Elmer Conway
- Caitlin Turner as Helene

== Production ==
Numerous filmmakers have attempted to adapt Thompson's novel into a film since the mid-1950s. 20th Century Fox originally optioned the project as a possible starring vehicle for Marilyn Monroe around 1956, with Monroe starring as Joyce Lakeland. Marlon Brando was attached to star as Lou Ford. Elizabeth Taylor was considered at the time for the role of Amy Stanton. After Monroe's unexpected death on August 5, 1962, the project was shelved.

A film adaptation was eventually made in 1976, directed by Burt Kennedy and starring Stacy Keach as Lou Ford and Susan Tyrrell as Joyce Lakeland.

In the mid-1990s, after the success of Pulp Fiction, Quentin Tarantino was attached to direct the project. Uma Thurman was set to star as Amy Stanton. Juliette Lewis was considered for the part of Joyce Lakeland and Brad Pitt was attached to star as Lou Ford. This effort fell through after the September 11 attacks, because the film script was deemed too violent. Tarantino scrapped everything and started from scratch.

In 2002, Andrew Dominik wrote a highly stylized screenplay, and Dominic Sena was attached to direct. At one point, Dominik was up to direct it. He hoped the film would star Leonardo DiCaprio as Lou Ford, Charlize Theron as Amy Stanton and Drew Barrymore as Joyce Lakeland. Dominik lost interest in doing a film adaptation of a 1950s novel, however, and instead chose to film The Assassination of Jesse James by the Coward Robert Ford. Marc Rocco stepped in, and wanted to cast Casey Affleck as Lou Ford, Reese Witherspoon as Amy Stanton and Maggie Gyllenhaal as Joyce Lakeland.

Kate Hudson admitted she was genuinely spanked in the scene with Casey Affleck.

== Release ==
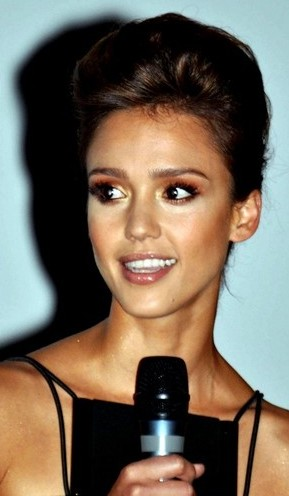
Jessica Alba presenting the film in Paris, in 2010.

The Killer Inside Me premiered on January 24, 2010, at Sundance Film Festival. In January 2010, IFC Films secured the rights of the film for around $1.5 million and announced the theatrical and VOD platforms release on June 9, 2010. It was nominated for the Golden Bear at the 60th Berlin International Film Festival. It is part of the 2010 Tribeca Film Festival and ran on April 27, 2010. The film had a limited theatrical release starting on June 18, 2010. The DVD and Blu-ray were released on September 28, 2010.

== Reception ==
The film received generally mixed reviews. On the review aggregator website Rotten Tomatoes, 56% of 129 critics' reviews are positive. The website's consensus reads: "The Killer Inside Me is stylish and beautifully shot, but Michael Winterbottom's distance from his characters robs this often brutally violent film of crucial emotional context." Metacritic, which uses a weighted average, assigned the film a score of 53 out of 100, based on 33 critics, indicating "mixed or average" reviews.

Winterbottom, attending the film's world premiere at the Sundance Film Festival, got an audience member's review before the credits had finished rolling: "I don't understand how Sundance could book this movie! How dare you? How dare Sundance?" Rachel Cooke of The Observer, after describing a "sickeningly protracted" scene from the film in which Joyce is beaten by Lou, said "I was so queasy, I had to go and stand outside. I thought I might actually faint"; she notes that several of the scenes of violence are "so long and so horribly graphic" and points out that "by lingering only over the violence done to women—by contrast, a male character gets to die off camera—he has, I think, ruined his own picture, drawing the audience's attention away both from its exquisite noir mood, and from Affleck's mesmerising performance. The violence is a bloody blot on an otherwise beautiful canvas."

Stephen Dalton, reviewing the film for The Times after it closed the Berlin Film Festival, acknowledged the controversy over the depiction of violence:

Although Ford's victims include men and women, it is his savage and sustained assaults on female characters that has made The Killer Inside Me controversial. Winterbottom shows these attacks in unflinching detail, a choice some consider unnecessary and exploitative. In fairness, the violence is sparingly used, which only makes it more stomach-churning. And compared to recent Tarantino or Coen brothers bloodbaths, this is restrained stuff. The film's critics, I suspect, have made the classic mistake of confusing content for intent.

Dalton, giving the film four stars out of five, called it a "thoughtful thriller which will bore some viewers with its low-key pacing, while repelling others with its flashes of sickening brutality. But for the less squeamish among us, The Killer Inside Me is an intelligent and gripping take on classic film noir ingredients." Affleck's portrayal of the sociopathic deputy divided reviewers, and was pointed to as one example of the film's many failures to measure up to both the original film and the character's personality and bearing in the source novel. Critics cited Affleck's boyish appearance and mannerisms, and "occasionally goofy, stilted" delivery as lacking the intensity such a role required. Despite receiving fairly decent reviews for her performance, Jessica Alba nonetheless still received a Golden Raspberry Award for Worst Supporting Actress, as well as being cited for her work in Little Fockers, Machete and Valentine's Day.
