= Everyday (film) =

- Official release poster
- Directed by: Michael Winterbottom
- Written by: Michael Winterbottom; Laurence Coriat
- Produced by: Laurence Bowen
- Starring: John Simm; Shirley Henderson
- Cinematography: Sean Bobbitt
- Music by: Michael Nyman
- Distributed by: Channel 4
- Release dates: 9 March 2012 (Telluride); 18 January 2013 (United Kingdom)
- Running time: 106 minutes
- Country: United Kingdom
- Language: English

Everyday is a 2012 British drama film co-written and directed by Michael Winterbottom. Known during its lengthy production variously as Seven Days and then Here and There, the film stars John Simm as a man named Ian who is imprisoned for drug smuggling and charts his relationship with his wife Karen, played by Shirley Henderson.

Everyday premiered at the Telluride Film Festival on 3 September 2012 and then screened at the Toronto International Film Festival on 8 September 2012.

== Production ==
Written by Winterbottom and Laurence Coriat, the film was shot a few weeks at a time over a five-year period from 2007 to 2012 to reflect the protagonist's time in prison and achieve an authentic aging process. The film was produced by Britain's Channel 4 and premiered in the UK on television on 15 November 2012, later released theatrically on 18 January 2013.

== Reception ==
=== Critical response ===
On review aggregator website Rotten Tomatoes, the film has a 74% approval rating based on 34 reviews, with an average ranking of 6.5/10. The site's critics consensus reads; "It suffers from pacing problems and an uneven screenplay, but Michael Winterbottom's Everyday is also a refreshingly unorthodox and admirably naturalistic take on one family's struggle to stay together". On Metacritic, the film has a weighted average score of 55 out of a 100 based on 13 critics, indicating "mixed or average reviews".

David Lee Dallas of Slant Magazine, wrote "While the film charts its protagonist’s gradual progression toward a renewed sense of agency and freedom, it rarely indulges in lengthy or even linear narrative arcs".

Stephen Holden of The New York Times said "Moment by moment, it all adds up. The scenes of the family huddling and hugging, greeting and parting, and reaffirming primal bonds are quietly moving".

According to David Calhoun of Time Out, "[Everyday is a] strangely intimate and powerful depiction of time passing and the peaks and troughs of childhood".

The A.V. Club's Mike D'Angelo was not impressed by the film. He wrote "For better and for worse—mostly for worse—it sticks to the mundane promise of its title".

Overseas, the critics were split. Catherine Shoard of The Guardian called the film "strange and stirring", while Peter Bradshaw of the same periodical called it "Another great success for the endlessly creative and productive Winterbottom".

David Saxton of the Evening Standard called it an "average prison drama".

Reporting for The Irish Times, Donald Clarke wrote "Utilising fluid shots of the English countryside set to one of Michael Nyman's most dynamic scores, Winterbottom makes something surprisingly lyrical of the non-story".

=== Awards ===
At the Stockholm International Film Festival in November the film was awarded the FIPRESCI-Award.

== See also ==
- List of films shot over three or more years
