= Michael Winterbottom =

English film director (born 1961)

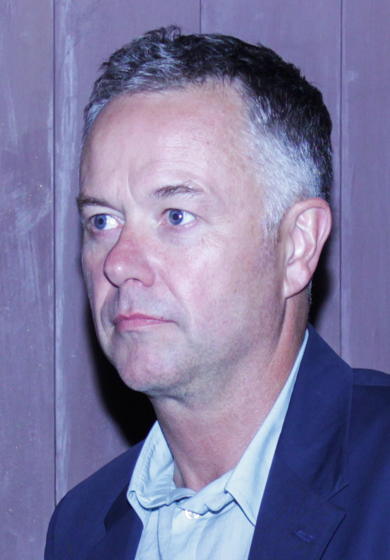
- Winterbottom in 2013
- Born: 29 March 1961 (age 65); Blackburn, Lancashire, England
- Education: Balliol College, Oxford; Bristol University
- Occupation: Film director
- Children: 3

Michael Winterbottom (born 29 March 1961) is an English film director. He began his career working in British television before moving into features. Three of his films—Welcome to Sarajevo (1997), Wonderland (1999) and 24 Hour Party People (2002)—have competed for the Palme d'Or at the Cannes Film Festival. He and co-director Mat Whitecross won the Silver Bear for Best Director at the 56th Berlin International Film Festival for their work on The Road to Guantánamo (2006).

His production company, Revolution Films, has a first-look deal with Fremantle.

== Early life ==
Winterbottom was born in Blackburn, Lancashire. He went to Queen Elizabeth's Grammar School, Blackburn, and then studied English at Balliol College, Oxford, before going to film school at Bristol University, where his contemporaries included Marc Evans.

== Early television career ==
Winterbottom's television directing career began in 1989, with a documentary about Ingmar Bergman and an episode of the children's series Dramarama. He followed this with the 1990 television film Forget About Me, starring Ewen Bremner, which followed two British soldiers who become involved in a love triangle with a young Hungarian hitch-hiker on their way to Budapest for a Simple Minds concert. It was his first collaboration with writer Frank Cottrell-Boyce; they would go on to make six more films together. Shot on 16 mm film, it was shown at a few European film festivals. In 1991, he directed episodes of various TV shows, including the four-part children's series Time Riders and an episode of Boon. In 1992, he directed the television film Under the Sun about a young British woman travelling in Greece, starring Kate Hardie. It was shot on Super 16 mm film, and gained him further attention. In 1993, he directed an episode of the Inspector Alleyn Mysteries; Love Lies Bleeding, a television film written by Ronan Bennett about a convicted IRA member on a 24-hour home leave from prison in Belfast; and The Mad Woman in the Attic, the pilot of Jimmy McGovern's mystery series Cracker. He next directed the 1994 mini-series Family, written by Roddy Doyle, the author of The Commitments. It was a success in Ireland and led to a debate there about the depiction of both the working classes and spousal abuse in the media. His final early television project was a 1995 episode of the documentary series Cinema Europe: The Other Hollywood, focusing on Scandinavian silent cinema.

== Film career ==
=== 1990s ===
Butterfly Kiss, Winterbottom's 1995 debut feature, followed a mentally unbalanced lesbian serial killer and her submissive lover/accomplice as they fall in love while slaughtering their way across the motorways of Northern England. It found only a limited release.

That same year, he reunited with Jimmy McGovern for the BBC television film Go Now, the story of a young man who falls ill with multiple sclerosis just as he meets the love of his life. Focusing on the turmoil this causes the couple, the film was given a theatrical release in many countries. It was also the first film from Winterbottom's company Revolution Films.

His 1996 film Jude starred Christopher Eccleston and Kate Winslet. It was an adaptation of Winterbottom's favourite novel, Thomas Hardy's bleak classic Jude the Obscure, a tale of forbidden love between two cousins. The film brought Winterbottom wider recognition, his first screening at Cannes and numerous Hollywood offers.

1997's Welcome to Sarajevo was filmed on location in the titular city, mere months after the Siege of Sarajevo had ended. It was based on the true story of British reporter, Michael Nicholson, who spirited a young orphan girl out of the war zone to safety in Britain.

His 1998 film I Want You is a neo-noir sex thriller set in a decaying British seaside resort town. Starring Rachel Weisz and Alessandro Nivola, it was inspired by the Elvis Costello song of the same name and shot by Polish cinematographer Sławomir Idziak, who won an Honourable Mention award at the 48th Berlin International Film Festival for his work.

He followed that with 1999's With or Without You, a Belfast-set comedy starring Christopher Eccleston, about a couple trying desperately to conceive, who each have past loves re-enter their lives.

That same year, he also released Wonderland, which marked a shift in style for Winterbottom. Its handheld photography and naturalistic dialogue drew comparisons to Robert Altman. Starring Gina McKee, Shirley Henderson, Molly Parker, John Simm, Ian Hart and Stuart Townsend, it is the story of three sisters and their extended family over Guy Fawkes Day weekend in London. It featured an orchestral score by minimalist composer Michael Nyman, who would become a frequent collaborator with Winterbottom.

=== 2000s ===
Winterbottom's biggest-budgeted film up to that point, at $20 million, his 2000 film The Claim was an adaptation of Thomas Hardy's The Mayor of Casterbridge set in 1860s California. Shot in the wilds of Canada, it was not a financial success and proved an ordeal to make, with Winterbottom himself getting frostbite. Many of the production difficulties, including unsuccessful attempts to cast Madonna, were explained to the public on the film's unusually frank official website.

24 Hour Party People, released in 2001, documents the anarchic, drug and sex-fueled rise and fall of Factory Records and the music scene in Manchester from the late 1970s to the mid-1990s. It would be the first of many collaborations between Winterbottom and actor Steve Coogan, who starred as broadcaster/music-mogul Tony Wilson.

His 2002 film In This World depicts the journey of two Afghan refugees from Pakistan, across the Middle East and Europe to Britain, which they try to enter with the help of people smugglers. Shot on digital video at a cost of $2 million, it featured non-professional actors and brought Winterbottom numerous awards, including a Golden Bear and a BAFTA for best film not in the English language.

Code 46, released in 2003, is a sci-fi retelling of the Oedipus myth, in a world where cloning has created people so interrelated that strict laws (the Code 46 of the title) govern human reproduction. The romantic mystery film starred Tim Robbins and Samantha Morton. It was shot in Shanghai, Dubai and Rajasthan, which were mixed to create a futuristic multi-ethnic culture.

2004's 9 Songs gained attention as the most sexually explicit film ever to receive a certificate for general release in the UK. It charts a year-long relationship between two lovers, almost exclusively through their sexual interaction and various rock concerts the couple attend. The film became notorious in the UK for its candid scenes of unsimulated sex between the leads, Kieran O'Brien and Margo Stilley.

His 2005 film A Cock and Bull Story, released in the United States and Australia as Tristram Shandy: A Cock and Bull Story, is an adaptation of the famously "unfilmable" The Life and Opinions of Tristram Shandy, Gentleman, an early novel. The film is a faux documentary about the making of a film of Tristram Shandy. Steve Coogan stars as himself and as Shandy. The film marked the end of Winterbottom's lengthy collaboration with Frank Cottrell Boyce, who chose to be credited under the pseudonym Martin Hardy.

The Road to Guantanamo is a 2006 docu-drama about the "Tipton Three", three British Muslims captured by US forces in Afghanistan who spent two years as prisoners at the Guantanamo Bay detention camp as alleged enemy combatants. It was shot in Afghanistan, Pakistan, and Iran (which doubled for Cuba) in the autumn of 2005. It premiered at the Berlinale on 14 February 2006. It debuted in the UK on television, on 9 March, as it was co-financed by Channel 4.

2007's A Mighty Heart is based on the book by Mariane Pearl, wife of murdered journalist Daniel Pearl. The film stars Angelina Jolie and focuses on the pregnant Mariane's search for her missing husband in Pakistan in 2002. Produced by Jolie's then-partner Brad Pitt, it was shot in the autumn of 2006 in India, Pakistan and France and premiered out of competition at the 2007 Cannes Film Festival on 21 May 2007.

In 2008, his film Genova was released, a family drama about an Englishman, played by Colin Firth, who moves his two American daughters to Italy following the death of his wife. Once there, the oldest girl starts exploring her sexuality, while the younger girl begins to see the ghost of her mother. It co-stars Catherine Keener and Hope Davis and was filmed in the titular city of Genoa, Italy, during the summer of 2007.

In 2009, Winterbottom was reunited with his The Road to Guantanamo co-director Mat Whitecross on a documentary based on Naomi Klein's bestselling book The Shock Doctrine. The film follows the use of upheavals and disasters by various governments as a cover for the implementation of free market economic policies that benefit only an elite few. Klein at first disowned the film after learning that it would be composed almost entirely of period footage and narration, with virtually no interview material with sources. The film premiered at the 2009 Berlin Film Festival and aired in the UK on Channel 4's More4 documentary channel on 1 September 2009. It made its American premiere at the 2010 Sundance Film Festival, alongside Winterbottom's following film. At the festival, Klein, who had reconciled herself with the filmmakers' approach, participated in a Q&A with Winterbottom and Whitecross.

=== 2010s ===
Winterbottom's 2010 film The Killer Inside Me is an adaptation of Jim Thompson's 1952 noir novel. Starring Casey Affleck, Kate Hudson and Jessica Alba, it follows a 1950s small town Texas sheriff (Affleck), who is also a psychotic killer, through his descent into complete madness. It premiered at the 2010 Sundance Film Festival and caused controversy for the realistic brutality of its violence toward women. In his defence, Winterbottom said, "It's not the real world. It's kind of a parallel version of the real world... I was taken in by that world."

This improvised six-episode 2010 comedy series The Trip, filmed in the English Lake District and written and directed by Winterbottom, starred Steve Coogan and Rob Brydon as the same semi-fictionalized versions of themselves they played in A Cock and Bull Story. Coogan, an actor unhappy with his career, agrees to write a series of restaurant reviews for The Observer in order to impress his girlfriend Misha (Margo Stilley). As the series opens, she has dumped him and he invites Brydon to take her place on the holiday. Each episode of the series takes place largely over a different gourmet meal. The episodes were edited down into a feature film for the US market, which premiered at the Toronto International Film Festival in September 2010, while the full series aired on BBC Two starting in November 2010.

Winterbottom's 2011 Trishna is a modern retelling of Tess of the d'Urbervilles is his third Thomas Hardy film. It stars Riz Ahmed and Freida Pinto and was shot in Jaipur and Mumbai, India in early 2011. It premiered at the Toronto International Film Festival on 9 September 2011. It was released in the UK on 9 March 2012 and in the US on 13 July.

2012's Everyday, known during its lengthy production first as Seven Days and then as Here and There, stars John Simm as a man imprisoned for drug-smuggling and charts his relationship with his wife, played by Shirley Henderson. Written by Winterbottom and Laurence Coriat, the film was shot a few weeks at a time over a five-year period from 2007 to 2012 to reflect the protagonist's time in prison and achieve an authentic aging process. Everyday premiered at the Telluride Film Festival on 3 September 2012, and then screened at the Toronto International Film Festival on 8 September 2012. The film was produced by Britain's Channel 4 and premiered in the UK on television on 15 November 2012, before being theatrically on 18 January 2013. At the Stockholm International Film Festival in November, the film won the FIPRESCI Prize.

His 2013 film The Look of Love was originally announced as The King of Soho, until that title had to be dropped due to a legal dispute, A biography of famed British pornographer/strip club owner/real estate entrepreneur Paul Raymond, it reteamed Winterbottom with Steve Coogan, who played Raymond. The film costarred Imogen Poots, Anna Friel and Tamsin Egerton and was written by Matt Greenhalgh. It was released in the UK on 26 April 2013.

Winterbottom filmed a second series of the hit BBC show The Trip To Italy in the summer of 2013 in Italy. It followed the route of the Romantics – Percy Bysshe Shelley, Lord Byron and John Keats. Like the first series, IFC Films distributed it in the US as a shorter feature-length film, which premiered at the Sundance Film Festival in January 2014. The full series aired on BBC Two in April 2014.

Hosted by comedian Russell Brand, the 2015 documentary The Emperor's New Clothes focuses on the 2008 financial crisis and global economic inequality. It premiered in London on 21 April 2015, followed by its international premiere on 24 April 2015 at the Tribeca Film Festival.

The 2016 film On the Road follows the British band Wolf Alice, focusing on two fictional members of the band's crew, played by Leah Harvey and James McArdle, while the band is on tour. It premiered on 9 October 2016 at the BFI London Film Festival.

Winterbottom reunited with Coogan and Brydon for The Trip to Spain in 2017, a third six-episode series in which the duo travel through Spain. As with the previous instalments, it premiered on 6 April 2017 as a six-part weekly TV series on Sky Atlantic, and as a shorter feature film on 22 April 2017 at the Tribeca Film Festival. The film was released in the US on 11 August 2017.

The 2018 thriller The Wedding Guest starred Dev Patel as a mysterious young British Muslim man who travels to Pakistan to kidnap a young woman (Radhika Apte) on the eve of her arranged marriage. It was filmed in Jaipur, India and other locations in Rajasthan beginning in February 2018 and premiered at the Toronto International Film Festival on 8 September 2018.

2019's Greed is a comedy satirizing the lives of the ultra-rich, starring Steve Coogan as a fictional retail fashion magnate, Isla Fisher as his wife, and David Mitchell as a journalist hired to write the billionaire's life story. The film is set at the billionaire's disastrous 60th birthday party on Mykonos, and explores the divide between the character's wealth and the abject poverty of the workers who produce his products. The project was previously set to star Sacha Baron Cohen. Winterbottom completed photography in December 2018. The film premiered at the Toronto International Film Festival on 7 September 2019.

=== 2020s ===
Coogan and Brydon reunited with Winterbottom for The Trip to Greece, a fourth series of their popular programme, set in Greece and broadcast in 2020. It premiered on 3 March 2020 as a 6-part weekly TV series on Sky One. It was again edited down into a feature film in the US, whose planned theatrical release by IFC Films in summer 2020 was cancelled due to the COVID-19 pandemic. It premiered with a digital and on demand release on 22 May 2020.

2021's documentary feature, Isolation, originally announced under the title Europe C-19, contains five 15-minute segments from directors across Europe, with Winterbottom handling the UK portion. Winterbottom began filming his portion of this film on 5 September 2020. The other portions were directed by Julia von Heinz (Germany), Fernando León de Aranoa (Spain), Jaco Van Dormael (Belgium), and Michele Placido (Italy). The film premiered in September 2021 at the 78th Venice International Film Festival.

Winterbottom co-directed the 2022 documentary Eleven Days in May, which focused on the deaths of over 60 Palestinian children killed during the Israeli bombing of Gaza over an eleven day period in May 2021. Gaza-based film-maker Mohammed Sawwaf was the other director and Kate Winslet provided the narration. It was released in the UK on 6 May 2022.

2022's 6-part TV miniseries This England focuses on Boris Johnson's leadership of Britain, starting with his appointment as Prime Minister and continuing through the COVID-19 pandemic, when Johnson caught the virus and became critically ill, while his partner gave birth to their son, and Britain suffered among the worst death tolls in the world. Kenneth Branagh stars as Johnson, with Ophelia Lovibond as Carrie Symonds and Simon Paisley Day as Dominic Cummings. Originally titled This Sceptred Isle, Winterbottom was set to direct every episode of the miniseries, which he co-wrote with Kieron Quirke. However, after filming began in February 2021, Winterbottom stepped down from directing in March, reportedly due to health issues. The miniseries was broadcast on Sky on 28 September 2022.

Winterbottom's 2023 political thriller Shoshana, previously titled Promised Land, had its world premiere at the 2023 Toronto International Film Festival. It is set in 1930s/1940s British Mandatory Palestine and stars Douglas Booth as Tom Wilkin and Harry Melling as Geoffrey J. Morton, two British police officers hunting Zionist militant Avraham Stern. It co-stars Irina Starshenbaum as Shoshana Borochov. The screenplay was written by Winterbottom, Laurence Coriat and Paul Viragh. Winterbottom has been developing the film for many years. In 2010, Jim Sturgess, Colin Firth and Matthew Macfadyen were announced as its stars. While the film never entered production in 2010, Winterbottom did shoot documentary footage in Israel at the time with surviving participants in the events. Filming began in October 2021 in the town of Ostuni in Italy, which doubled for Tel Aviv.

In February 2025, Winterbottom began production on Gaza Year Zero. Reuniting him with his Eleven Days in May co-director Mohammed Sawwaf, the fictional film follows a 13-year-old boy and his family struggling to survive the destruction of war. Sawwaf is directing on location in Gaza, while Winterbottom is co-directing and editing in London.

In 2025, Winterbottom also filmed The Trip to the Northern Lights, the fifth series of The Trip, with Steve Coogan and Rob Brydon, in Scandinavia. The first two episodes premiered on 17 October 2026 at the 2026 BFI London Film Festival. The series is scheduled to be broadcast in the UK by Sky in December 2026.

=== Future projects ===
In December 2023, it was announced that Winterbottom will direct a new adaptation of Ernest Hemingway's classic novel A Farewell to Arms, starring Tom Blyth. Producers aim to begin filming in early 2027.

In March 2023, it was announced that Winterbottom will write and direct Fall of the God of Cars, a 6-part miniseries in which Tony Shalhoub is set to play Lebanese/Brazilian auto executive Carlos Ghosn, who was arrested in Japan, eventually escaping house arrest and fleeing the country and prosecution.

=== Unmade projects ===
In 2017, it was announced that Winterbottom was developing a 10-part TV series with Annapurna Pictures about the war in Syria, focusing on the involvement of foreign journalists and Non-governmental organizations. He first announced in May 2017 that he was researching the project.

In May 2014, it was announced that Winterbottom would direct a feature adaptation of Richard Hammer's 1982 book The Vatican Connection, the true story of how NYPD detective Joe Coffey uncovered connections between the Vatican and the Mafia while investigating a local New York mobster, leading to a global investigation. It was to be written by Paul Viragh, based on an earlier script by Alessandro Camon.

In October 2011, it was announced that Winterbottom would direct an adaption of Richard DiLello's 1973 book, The Longest Cocktail Party. It was to tell the story of Apple Corps, the record company formed by The Beatles in 1968. It was to follow the company and its staff, including DiLello and Derek Taylor, from 1968 to its closure in 1970, when The Beatles split. The book was set to be adapted by Jesse Armstrong and co-produced by Andrew Eaton and Liam Gallagher.

Winterbottom was attached in May 2011 to direct Bailout, an adaptation of author Jess Walter's novel The Financial Lives of the Poets, which Walter adapted for the screen. Set to star Jack Black, the film was to follow a man who loses his job and must keep his family afloat by working as a pot dealer.

=== Books ===
In 2021, Winterbottom published Dark Matter: Independent Filmmaking in the 21st Century, a book about the workings of the British independent film industry. It is based on his own experience over his career, and includes interviews with 15 other major British directors: Paweł Pawlikowski, Danny Boyle, Joanna Hogg, Asif Kapadia, James Marsh, Andrew Haigh, Carol Morley, Edgar Wright, Steve McQueen, Lynne Ramsay, Stephen Daldry, Ben Wheatley, Peter Strickland, Mike Leigh and Ken Loach.

== Personal life ==
Winterbottom has two daughters and a son.

Winterbottom is an atheist.

== Filmography ==
- Rosie the Great (1989, TV)
- Forget About Me (1990, TV)
- Under the Sun (1992, TV)
- Love Lies Bleeding (1993, TV)
- Family (1994, TV)
- Butterfly Kiss (1995)
- Go Now (1995)
- Jude (1996)
- Welcome to Sarajevo (1997)
- I Want You (1998)
- Wonderland (1999)
- With or Without You (1999)
- The Claim (2000)
- 24 Hour Party People (2002)
- In This World (2002)
- Code 46 (2003)
- 9 Songs (2004)
- A Cock and Bull Story (2005)
- The Road to Guantanamo (2006)
- A Mighty Heart (2007)
- Genova (2008)
- The Shock Doctrine (2009)
- The Killer Inside Me (2010)
- The Trip (2010, TV)
- Trishna (2011)
- Everyday (2012)
- The Look of Love (2013)
- The Trip to Italy (2014, TV)
- The Face of an Angel (2014)
- The Emperor's New Clothes (2015)
- On the Road (2016)
- The Trip to Spain (2017)
- The Wedding Guest (2018)
- Greed (2019)
- The Trip to Greece (2020)
- Isolation (2021)
- Eleven Days in May (2022)
- This England (2022, TV)
- Shoshana (2023)
- The Trip to the Northern Lights (TBC)
- Gaza Year Zero (TBC)
