= Matthew Barney: No Restraint =

2006 documentary directed by Alison Chernick

Matthew Barney: No Restraint is a 2006 documentary directed by Alison Chernick. It follows artist Matthew Barney (best known for The Cremaster Cycle) and his collaborator, singer-songwriter Björk, as they embark on a filmmaking journey in Japan. It reveals Barney's process in creating Drawing Restraint 9, a cinematic "piece" that combines a whaling vessel; 45,000 pounds of petroleum jelly; and traditional Japanese rituals into a fantasy love story.

It premiered at the Berlin Film Festival and had its theatrical release in December 2006 after being acquired by IFC/The Weinstein Company. On the review aggregator website Rotten Tomatoes, 50% of 22 critics' reviews are positive. The website's consensus reads: "Matthew Barney: No Restraint makes an honest attempt to illuminate its subject's provocative work, but ultimately fails to capture its inspiration or appeal."
