= Go Now (film) =

- Theatrical release poster
- Written by: Jimmy McGovern; Paul Henry Powell
- Directed by: Michael Winterbottom
- Starring: Robert Carlyle; Juliet Aubrey
- Music by: Alastair Gavin
- Country of origin: United Kingdom
- Original language: English

Production
- Cinematography: Daf Hobson
- Editor: Travor Waite
- Running time: 109 minutes
- Production companies: PolyGram Filmed Entertainment; BBC

Original release
- Release: 16 September 1995

Go Now is a 1995 television film directed by Michael Winterbottom and starring Robert Carlyle as an MS-afflicted construction worker and football player, living in Bristol with his girlfriend and struggling with the onset of multiple sclerosis.

It had a limited theatrical release in the United Kingdom and United States. It won the Prix Europa Television Programme of the Year 1995.

== Cast ==
- Robert Carlyle as Nick Cameron
- Juliet Aubrey as Karen
- James Nesbitt as Tony
- Sophie Okonedo as Paula
- Berwick Kaler as Sammy
- Darren Tighe as Dell
- Sean McKenzie as George
- John Brobbey as Geoff
- Sara Stockbridge as Bridget, the bartender
- Tom Watson as Bill Cameron
- Barbara Rafferty as Madge Cameron
- Sean Rocks as Charlie
- Dave Schneider as doctor
- Tony Curran as Chris Cameron
- Erin McMahon as Julie Cameron
- Jenny Jules as doctor
- Roger Ashton-Griffiths as Walsh
- Tricky as himself
- Anna Godsiff as female nurse
- James Trehearne as male nurse
- Susie Fugle as scan doctor
- Cal McGregor as man in a wheelchair

== Reception ==
On review aggregator website Rotten Tomatoes, the film has a 60% approval rating based on 10 reviews, with an average ranking of 6/10.

Lisa Schwarzbaum of Entertainment Weekly gave the film a score of "B−".

Janet Maslin of The New York Times wrote that the film "depicts the onset of multiple sclerosis with force and accuracy, thanks to the understated precision of Carlyle's performance and the real fear and frustration he conveys".

According to Derek Elley of Variety, the film "[is] a genre-busting an-them to life, love and friendship that's a further feather in the cap of multitalented Brit helmer Michael Winterbottom".
