= Eleven Days in May =

11 Days in May
- Directed by: Mohammed Sawwaf; Michael Winterbottom
- Release date: May 6, 2022
- Running time: 85 minutes
- Country: United Kingdom

Eleven Days in May is a 2022 documentary that revolves around life in Gaza. Co-directed by Mohammed Sawwaf and Michael Winterbottom, Palestinian and British filmmakers respectively, the film specifically focusses on an 11 day bombing campaign by Israel. The aim of the film was to memorialize the children of Palestine who were killed. The documentary includes interviews from the families that were victims of the bombing. The film was given a 18 certificate since it showed the dead bodies of children. The film was distributed by Revolution Films.

== Review ==
Guardian wrote about the film, "The effect (of the film) is repetitive, relentless – much like the events themselves. It is a very bleak picture, something to be compared perhaps with Garry Keane and Andrew McConnell’s film Gaza about life under siege" The Times wrote "It’s an 18-certificate horror show, but culled from real life." The Telegraph rated it 5 out of 5 and write "Assembling a memorial to the dead is all this film is doing, and everything it needs to do. We’re not embroiled in disputing anything: in terms of what’s strictly on screen, there’s nothing to dispute"
