= The Emperor's New Clothes (2015 film) =

- Directed by: Michael Winterbottom
- Written by: Michael Winterbottom
- Produced by: Melissa Parmenter
- Starring: Russell Brand
- Cinematography: James Clarke
- Edited by: Marc Richardson
- Music by: Joel Cadbury
- Production company: Revolution Films
- Distributed by: StudioCanal (United Kingdom); IFC Films (United States)
- Release date: 21 April 2015 (London premiere)
- Running time: 107 minutes
- Countries: United Kingdom; United States; France
- Language: English

The Emperor's New Clothes is a 2015 documentary film about the growing disparity between economic classes, directed by Michael Winterbottom and starring actor/activist Russell Brand.

== Synopsis ==
The film contains archival footage from the 2008 financial crisis and Great Recession paired with "comedic send-ups" from Brand, conducted in the financial districts of London and New York. In one scene in the film, Brand attempts to confront Lord Rothermere, the billionaire owner of the Daily Mail, about his "non-dom" tax status, through which he avoids paying taxes in the United Kingdom by claiming residence elsewhere. When Brand rings the bell at Rothermere's London mansion and asks through the intercom to speak to him, he is told by an unseen person that Rothermere does indeed live there.

Winterbottom stated that the film will explore why "nothing has changed" since the 2008 financial crisis.

"It's about inequality and why the 1 percent (of the world's wealthy) seem to have so much and the rest of us not quite so much," Winterbottom told the BBC in October 2014. "Everyone knows about equality and what's going on in the world, so the idea is to point out the ludicrous extremes of our society."

The documentary began shooting in October. Winterbottom and Brand had previously discussed—but ultimately abandoned—the idea of producing a film version of Brand's first memoir, My Booky Wook.

== Distribution and release ==
The film is produced by Winterbottom's Revolution Films company and distributed by StudioCanal UK.

The Emperor's New Clothes debuted in London on 21 April 2015, followed by a question-and-answer session with Brand. It made its international debut in the Spotlight Category on 24 April at the Tribeca Film Festival.

== Reception ==
On review aggregator website Rotten Tomatoes, the film has a 60% approval rating based on 40 reviews, with an average ranking of 5.6/10. The site's consensus states: "The Emperor's New Clothes offers trenchant, timely insight on the current socioeconomic climate that is only partly undermined by star Russell Brand's self-aggrandizing on-screen persona". On Metacritic, the film has a weighted average score of 53 out of a 100 based on 7 critics, indicating "mixed or average reviews".

Martin Tsal of the Los Angeles Times wrote "Advocacy documentaries simply don't get better or more compelling than this". David Calhoun of Time Out said "Even if you can't stand the sight of this greasy Jesus, you might warm to the tub-thumping political doc[umentary] he's made with director Michael Winterbottom". According to Stephen Holden of The New York Times the film is "moderately effective agitprop".

NPR's Scott Tobias criticised the film for its branding, calling it a "hectoring irritant throughout the film". A similar criticism came from Noel Murray of The A.V. Club who added "Russell Brand rants about the economy for 101 goddamn minutes in [this film]".

Following the film's premiere at the Tribeca Film Festival, Kenji Fujishima wrote "The Emperor's New Clothes suggests that Russell Brand has picked up a few tactics from Michael Moore". While Fujishima was rather fond of the film, another contributor of Slant's, Clayton Dillard, criticised the film for "hyping Russell Brand as a constituent for the people [rather] than locating the means for sustained economic transformation".

Even though the US publications were mixed on the film, the national newspapers in Britain and Ireland were mostly fond of The Emperor's New Clothes. Peter Bradshaw of The Guardian called the film "[an] entertaining attack on the dishonesty and mediocrity of Britain's corporate overlords". Geoffrey Macnab of The Independent wrote "Brand puts across a familiar message in a very lucid and entertaining fashion". Financial Times's Nigel Andrews have praised the film for its "Socratic dialogues".

According to Charlotte O'Sullivan of the Evening Standard, the film "[r]espects our intelligence and bombards us with jolting facts about the ever-widening gap between rich and poor".

Wendy Ide of The Times was the only British critic who gave the film a negative review, stating "The Emperor's New Clothes is a case study in the pitfalls of personality-led documentary".

Donald Clarke of The Irish Times was also critical of the film, stating "Many sympathetic to the comic's critique of bandit capitalism will be repelled by his flamboyant self-regard".

From Australia, Sandra Hall of The Sydney Morning Herald stated "Angry but affable is the style adopted by British comic Russell Brand for this extended rant against the sins of the rich and powerful".
