= Andrew Eaton =

British film producer

- Born: Andrew Campbell Eaton; 7 December 1959 (age 66); Derry, Northern Ireland
- Education: Campbell College; Churchill College
- Occupations: Film and television producer

Andrew Campbell Eaton (born 7 December 1959) is a film and television producer. He was educated at Campbell College and Churchill College, graduating with a BA in 1982. In 1994, he co-founded Revolution Films.
