= The Trip to Greece =

- Theatrical release poster
- Directed by: Michael Winterbottom
- Produced by: Josh Hyams; Melissa Parmenter
- Starring: Steve Coogan; Rob Brydon
- Cinematography: James Clarke
- Edited by: Marc Richardson
- Production company: Revolution Films
- Distributed by: IFC Films
- Release date: 22 May 2020
- Running time: 103 minutes
- Country: United Kingdom
- Languages: English; Greek

The Trip to Greece is a 2020 British comedy film directed by Michael Winterbottom. It is the fourth installment of Winterbottom's film adaptations of the TV series The Trip, following The Trip (2011), The Trip to Italy (2014) and The Trip to Spain (2017). The film stars Steve Coogan and Rob Brydon as fictionalized versions of themselves continuing their culinary travels away from home.

== Cast ==
- Steve Coogan as Steve Coogan
- Rob Brydon as Rob Brydon
- Claire Keelan as Emma
- Rebecca Johnson as Sally
- Marta Barrio as Yolanda
- Tim Leach as Joe
- Cordelia Bugeja as Katherine
- Justin Edwards as Greg

== Reception ==
On review aggregator Rotten Tomatoes, the film has an approval rating of 88% based on 121 reviews, with an average rating of 7.30 out of 10. The site's critics consensus reads, "The Trip to Greece sees this series subject to the laws of diminishing returns, but Rob Brydon and Steve Coogan remain reliably enjoying company." On Metacritic, the film has a weighted average score of 69 out of 100, based on 31 critics, indicating "generally favorable reviews.
