= David Denby bibliography =

A list of the published works of David Denby, American journalist and film critic.

== Books ==
External videos
- Presentation by Denby on Great Books, September 21, 1996, C-SPAN
- Booknotes interview with Denby on Great Books, December 22, 1996, C-SPAN
- Presentation by Denby on Snark, January 28, 2009, C-SPAN
- Presentation by Denby on Lit Up, April 15, 2016, C-SPAN
- Presentation by Denby on American Sucker, February 19, 2004

=== Non–fiction ===
- Denby, David, ed. (1977). Awake in the dark : an anthology of American film criticism, 1915 to the present. New York: Vintage Books.
- — (1996). Great books : my adventures with Homer, Rousseau, Woolf, and other indestructible writers of the Western world. New York: Simon & Schuster.
- — (2009). Snark : a polemic in seven fits.
- — (2012). Do the movies have a future?. New York: Simon & Schuster.
- — (2016). Lit up : one reporter, three schools, twenty-four books that can change lives. New York: Henry Holt.
- — (2025). Eminent Jews: Bernstein, Brooks, Friedan, Mailer. New York: Henry Holt.

=== Memoir ===
- Denby, David (2004). American sucker. Boston: Little, Brown.

== Essays and reporting ==
=== 2000–2009 ===
- Denby, David (November 17, 2008). "Tabula rasa". Goings on About Town. Critic's Notebook. The New Yorker. Vol. 84, no. 37. p. 35. Reviews François Truffaut's The Wild Child (1970).
- — (December 8, 2008). "History in the making". The Critics. The Current Cinema. The New Yorker. Vol. 84, no. 40. pp. 102–103. Reviews Ron Howard's Frost/Nixon (2008) and Baz Luhrmann's Australia (2008).
- — (January 12, 2009). "Survivors". The Critics. The Current Cinema. The New Yorker. Vol. 84, no. 44. pp. 72–73. Reviews Edwards Zwick's Defiance and Abdellatif Kechiche's The Secret of the Grain.

=== 2010–2014 ===
- Denby, David (April 5, 2010). "Male call". The Critics. The Current Cinema. The New Yorker. Vol. 86, no. 8. pp. 86–87. Reviews Tim Blake Nelson's Leaves of Grass (2009), Raymond De Felitta's City Island (2009) and Andy Tennant's The Bounty Hunter (2010).
- — (April 26, 2010). "News to them". Goings on About Town. Critic's Notebook. The New Yorker. Vol. 86, no. 10. p. 12. Reviews William Wellman's Nothing Sacred (1937).
- — (June 7, 2010). "The seat of power". Goings on About Town. Critic's Notebook. The New Yorker. Vol. 86, no. 16. p. 9. Reviews Edward F. Cline's Million Dollar Legs (1932).
- — (October 11, 2010). "Triple cross". Goings on About Town. Critic's Notebook. The New Yorker. Vol. 86, no. 31. p. 30. Reviews Phil Karlson's Kansas City Confidential (1952).
- — (October 4, 2010). "Influencing people". The New Yorker. Vol. 86, no. 3. pp. 98–102. Reviews David Fincher's The Social Network (2010).
- — (March 14, 2011). "End games". The Critics. A Critic at Large. The New Yorker. Vol. 87, no. 4. pp. 65–68. Reviews the films of Abbas Kiarostami.
- — (April 4, 2011). "A man's world". Goings on About Town. Critic's Notebook. The New Yorker. Vol. 87, no. 7. p. 13. Reviews Kenji Mizoguchi's Life of Oharu (1952).
- — (March 14, 2011). "Looking for love". The Critics. The Current Cinema. The New Yorker. Vol. 87, no. 4. pp. 78–79. Reviews Peter and Bobby Farrelly's Hall Pass (2011), Michael Dowse's Take Me Home Tonight (2011) and Cary Fukunaga's Jane Eyre (2011).
- — (November 14, 2011). "The man in charge". The Critics. The Current Cinema. The New Yorker. Vol. 87, no. 36. pp. 90–91. Reviews Clint Eastwood's J. Edgar (2011).
- — (January 2, 2012). "Battle stations". The Critics. The Current Cinema. The New Yorker. Vol. 87, no. 42. pp. 78–79. Reviews Phyllida Lloyd's The Iron Lady (2011), Steven Spielberg's War Horse (2011) and Brad Bird's Mission: Impossible – Ghost Protocol (2011).
- — (January 16, 2012). "Lost love". The Critics. The Current Cinema. The New Yorker. Vol. 87, no. 44. pp. 80–81. Reviews Stephen Daldry's Extremely Loud & Incredibly Close (2011) and Cameron Crowe's We Bought a Zoo (2011).
- — (January 30, 2012). "Brotherly love". Goings on About Town. Critic's Notebook. The New Yorker. Vol. 87, no. 46. p. 7. Reviews Gregory La Cava's Unfinished Business (1941).
- — (January 30, 2012). "Flesh and fantasy". The Critics. The Current Cinema. The New Yorker. Vol. 87, no. 46. pp. 78–79. Reviews Frederick Wiseman's Crazy Horse (2011), Baltasar Kormákur's Contraband (2012) and Steven Soderbergh's Haywire (2011).
- — (February 13–20, 2012). "Soldiering On". Goings on About Town. Critic's Notebook. The New Yorker. Vol. 88, no. 1. p. 10. William Wellman's The Story of G.I. Joe.
- — (February 13–20, 2012). "Powers of Evil". The Critics. The Current Cinema. The New Yorker. Vol. 88, no. 1. pp. 120–121. Josh Trank's Chronicle and Agnieszka Holland's In Darkness.
- — (April 16, 2012). "Learning on the job". The Critics. The Current Cinema. The New Yorker. Vol. 88, no. 9. pp. 116–117. Joseph Cedar's Footnote and Philippe Falardeau's Monsieur Lazhar.
- — (November 19, 2012). "Public Defender". Annals of Education. The New Yorker. Vol. 88, no. 36. pp. 66–75. Archived from the original on July 24, 2014. Diane Ravitch.
- — (November 26, 2012). "Animal Instincts". The Critics. The Current Cinema. The New Yorker. Vol. 88, no. 37. pp. 86–87. Ang Lee's Life of Pi and David O. Russell's Silver Linings Playbook.
- — (January 14, 2013). "Open country". The Critics. The Current Cinema. The New Yorker. Vol. 88, no. 43. pp. 78–79. Archived from the original on August 29, 2016. Gus Van Sant's Promised Land and Walter Salles' On the Road.
- — (January 28, 2013). "Stiff upper lips". The Critics. The Current Cinema. The New Yorker. Vol. 88, no. 45. pp. 80–81. Michael Apted's 56 Up and Juan Antonio Bayona's The Impossible.
- — (February 11–18, 2013). ""Eight" at Eighty". Goings on About Town. Critic's Notebook. The New Yorker. Vol. 89, no. 1. p. 26. George Cukor's Dinner at Eight.
- — (February 11–18, 2013). "The Last Picture Show". The Critics. The Current Cinema. The New Yorker. Vol. 89, no. 1. pp. 114–115. Steven Soderbergh.
- — (March 4, 2013). "Dangerous liaisons". The Critics. The Current Cinema. The New Yorker. Vol. 89, no. 3. pp. 80–81.Abbas Kiarostami's Like Someone in Love and Richard LaGravenese's Beautiful Creatures.
- — (March 11, 2013). "Lady Isabelle". Goings on About Town. Critic's Notebook. The New Yorker. Vol. 89, no. 4. p. 14. Isabelle Adjani.
- — (March 18, 2013). "Kids' stuff". The Critics. The Current Cinema. The New Yorker. Vol. 89, no. 5. pp. 86–87. Sam Raimi's Oz the Great and Powerful and Bryan Singer's Jack the Giant Slayer.
- — (April 1, 2013). "Shock corridors". Goings on About Town. Critic's Notebook. The New Yorker. Vol. 89, no. 7. p. 16. Stanley Kubrick's The Shining.
- — (April 1, 2013). "Rough rides". The Critics. The Current Cinema. The New Yorker. Vol. 89, no. 7. pp. 84–85. Derek Cianfrance's The Place Beyond the Pines and Antoine Fuqua's Olympus Has Fallen.
- — (April 15, 2013). "Commitments". The Critics. The Current Cinema. The New Yorker. Vol. 89, no. 9. pp. 84–85. Terrence Malick's To the Wonder and Robert Redford's The Company you Keep.
- — (April 22, 2013). "Artful Dodgers". The Critics. The Current Cinema. The New Yorker. Vol. 89, no. 10. pp. 114–115. Brian Helgeland's 42.
- — (April 29, 2013). "Love and labor". Goings on About Town. Critic's Notebook. The New Yorker. Vol. 89, no. 11. p. 9.
- — (May 13, 2013). "All that jazz". The Critics. The Current Cinema. The New Yorker. Vol. 89, no. 13. pp. 78–79. Baz Luhrmann's The Great Gatsby.
- — (June 10–17, 2013). "Rob jobs". The Critics. The Current Cinema. The New Yorker. Vol. 89, no. 17. pp. 110–111. Reviews Louis Leterrier's Now You See Me and Sofia Coppola's The Bling Ring.
- — (August 5, 2013). "Young and restless". The Critics. The Current Cinema. The New Yorker. Vol. 89, no. 23. pp. 78–79. James Ponsoldt's The Spectacular Now, Maggie Carey's The To Do List and Paul Schrader's The Canyons.
- — (October 21, 2013). "Fighting to survive". The Critics. The Current Cinema. The New Yorker. Vol. 89, no. 33. pp. 108–109. Reviews Steve McQueen's 12 Years a Slave and J. C. Chandor's All is Lost.
- — (November 4, 2013). "Getting serious". The Critics. The Current Cinema. The New Yorker. Vol. 89, no. 35. pp. 116–117. Discusses Matthew McConaughey in Jean-Marc Vallée's Dallas Buyers Club (2013).
- — (December 2, 2013). "Winners and losers". The Critics. The Current Cinema. The New Yorker. Vol. 89, no. 39. pp. 66–68. Reviews Francis Lawrence's The Hunger Games: Catching Fire and Alex Gibney's The Armstrong Lie.
- — (December 16, 2013). "Grand scam". The Critics. The Current Cinema. The New Yorker. Vol. 89, no. 41. pp. 80–82. Reviews David O. Russell's American Hustle (2013).
- — (January 6, 2014). "Home truths". The Critics. The Current Cinema. The New Yorker. Vol. 89, no. 43. pp. 72–73. Reviews John Wells' August: Osage County (2013), Ralph Fiennes' The Invisible Woman (2013) and Peter Berg's Lone Survivor (2013).
- — (February 3, 2014). "Ordinary people". The Critics. The Current Cinema. The New Yorker. Vol. 89, no. 47. pp. 82–83. Reviews German television series Generation War (2013) and Tim Story's Ride Along (2014).
- — (March 17, 2014). "Hollywood at war : five major directors with a mission". The Critics. Books. The New Yorker. Vol. 90, no. 4. pp. 69–73.
- — (March 24, 2014). "The story of Joe". The Critics. The Current Cinema. The New Yorker. Vol. 90, no. 5. pp. 84–86. Lars von Trier's Nymphomaniac.
- — (March 31, 2014). "In a frenzy : Hitchcock's forgotten masterpiece, at Film Forum". Goings on About Town. Movies. The New Yorker. Vol. 90, no. 6. p. 10. Reviews Alfred Hitchcock's Frenzy (1972).
- — (April 21, 2014). "Field maneuvers". The Critics. The Current Cinema. The New Yorker. Vol. 90, no. 9. pp. 110–111. Reviews Ivan Reitman's Draft Day (2014) and Errol Morris' The Unknown Known (2013).
- — (June 2, 2014). "Disconnected man". The Critics. The Current Cinema. The New Yorker. Vol. 90, no. 15. pp. 82–83. Kelly Reichardt's Night Moves and Richard Ayoade's The Double.
- — (July 28, 2014). "Under the Spell". The Critics. The Current Cinema. The New Yorker. Vol. 90, no. 21. pp. 78–79. Woody Allen's Magic in the Moonlight and Anton Corbijn's A Most Wanted Man.
- — (September 1, 2014). "Lasting impressions". The Critics. The Current Cinema. The New Yorker. Vol. 90, no. 25. pp. 78–79. Reviews Michael Winterbottom's The Trip to Italy (2014).
- — (December 22–29, 2014). "Living history". The Critics. The Current Cinema. The New Yorker. Vol. 90, no. 41. pp. 150–151. Ava Du Vernay's Selma and Clint Eastwood's American Sniper.

=== 2015–2019 ===
- Denby, David (January 12, 2015). "Dirty oil". The Critics. The Current Cinema. The New Yorker. Vol. 90, no. 43. pp. 72–73. Reviews J. C. Chandor's A Most Violent Year (2014).
- — (January 2018). "Mr. Mailer goes to Washington : The Armies of the Night fifty years on". Reviews. Harper's Magazine. Vol. 336, no. 2012. pp. 89–94.
- — (February 11, 2019). "Nothing sacred". The Critics. Books. The New Yorker. Vol. 94, no. 48. pp. 62–67.
