= The Trip (2010 film) =

- Theatrical release poster
- Directed by: Michael Winterbottom
- Produced by: Andrew Eaton; Melissa Parmenter
- Starring: Steve Coogan; Rob Brydon
- Cinematography: Ben Smithard
- Edited by: Mags Arnold; Paul Monaghan
- Music by: Michael Nyman
- Production companies: Baby Cow Productions; BBC; Revolution Films
- Distributed by: IFC Films
- Release dates: September 2010 (Toronto); June 10, 2011 (United States)
- Running time: 112 minutes
- Country: United Kingdom
- Language: English
- Box office: $3.7 million

The Trip is a 2010 British comedy film directed by Michael Winterbottom. It is the first installment of Winterbottom's film adaptations of the TV series The Trip. The film stars Steve Coogan and Rob Brydon as fictional versions of themselves. Steve is asked by The Observer to tour the UK's finest restaurants, and when his girlfriend backs out on joining him, he is forced to go with his best friend, Rob. The film is largely improvised.

== Cast ==
- Steve Coogan as Steve Coogan
- Rob Brydon as Rob Brydon
- Rebecca Johnson as Sally
- Elodie Harrod as Chloe
- Dolya Gavanski as Magda
- Claire Keelan as Emma
- Justin Edwards as Steve's UK Agent
- Margo Stilley as Mischa
- Anna Stockton as Katherine
- Kerry Shale as Matt
- Marta Barrio as Yolanda

== Reception ==
The Trip film received positive reviews for the chemistry between its two leads and the duo's impressions. The film holds an 89% approval rating on Rotten Tomatoes, based on 109 reviews with an average rating of 7.40/10. The website's critical consensus reads, "Amiable, funny and sometimes insightful, The Trip works as both a showcase for the enduring chemistry between stars Steve Coogan and Rob Brydon and an unexpected perusal of men entering mid-life crises." Metacritic gave the film an average score of 82 out of 100, based on 33 reviews, indicating "universal acclaim".

Roger Ebert of The Chicago Sun-Times gave the film three out of four stars, and Manohla Dargis of The New York Times gave a positive review, writing "It’s unclear which is which, who is who, and that’s part of the journey — the destination too. To the extent that the man at the wheel (Mr. Coogan) and the guy riding shotgun (Mr. Brydon) are playacting is a question that Mr. Winterbottom and his stars enjoyably bat around. Does it matter where a performer ends and the persona begins, or if the two can be separated? In 'The Trip' you search for authenticity among the jokes and lulls, but what you get is what you see and hear: Mr. Coogan sniping, eating and whining, endlessly whining, about the size of his rooms, the state of his career, and Mr. Brydon a blissful foil. It’s plenty real." Linda Barnard of The Toronto Star wrote, "Think The Odd Couple with sartorial style and more bickering. Add hints of truisms about middle age, sex, family, mortality and the limits of friendship and The Trip reveals itself to be more than it initially appears."

Joe Morgenstern of The Wall Street Journal wrote that while the film "is probably too long", he "would have been happy with an additional half-hour of Steve and Rob doing more impressions". Noel Murray of The A.V. Club gave the film a B rating, saying that "there was no reason the film couldn't have been even funnier", while John Anderson of Variety said "viewers will barely stop laughing." Eric Kohn of IndieWire gave the film a grade of B+.

=== Box office ===
The film grossed a worldwide total of $3.7 million, of which $77,904 was on its opening weekend in the US.

== See also ==
- Tristram Shandy: A Cock and Bull Story
