= The Trip to Spain =

- Theatrical release poster
- Directed by: Michael Winterbottom
- Written by: Michael Winterbottom
- Produced by: Melissa Parmenter; Josh Hyams; Stefano Negri
- Starring: Rob Brydon; Steve Coogan
- Cinematography: James Clarke
- Edited by: Mags Arnold; Paul Monaghan; Marc Richardson
- Production companies: Revolution Films; Baby Cow Productions; Small Man; Sky
- Distributed by: IFC Films
- Release date: 11 August 2017
- Running time: 108 minutes
- Country: United Kingdom
- Language: English
- Box office: $2 million

The Trip to Spain is a 2017 British comedy drama film directed by Michael Winterbottom. It is the third installment of Winterbottom's film adaptations of the TV series The Trip, following The Trip (2011) and The Trip to Italy (2014). The film stars Steve Coogan and Rob Brydon as fictionalized versions of themselves continuing their culinary travels away from home. It was released on 11 August 2017.

== Premise ==
Steve convinces Rob to go on a road trip through Cantabria, the Basque region, Aragon, La Rioja, Castile, La Mancha and Andalucia, retracing the journey Steve took as a young man. On their journey the pair discuss history, fame, and fatherhood.

== Cast ==
- Steve Coogan as himself
- Rob Brydon as himself
- Claire Keelan as Emma
- Marta Barrio as Yolanda
- Kyle Soller as Jonathon
- Margo Stilley as Mischa

== Reception ==
On review aggregator Rotten Tomatoes, the film has an approval rating of 83% based on 108 reviews, with an average rating of 7.0/10. The site's critical consensus reads, "The Trip to Spain offers more of the same scenery, food, and conversation that filled Steve Coogan and Rob Brydon's first two Trips -- which is to say, more of a good thing." On Metacritic, the film has a weighted average score of 66 out of 100, based on 31 critics, indicating "generally favorable reviews.

Joshua Rothkopf of Time Out New York gave the film three out of five stars and David Ehrlich of IndieWire a B+ rating. Stephanie Zacharek of Time praised the film, saying "When you come to a Trip picture, you know you’ll be getting more of the same: These movies are reliable quantities in an unreliable world".
