= The Floor (British game show) =

- Genre: Game show
- Created by: John de Mol
- Based on: The Floor
- Presented by: Rob Brydon
- Country of origin: United Kingdom
- Original language: English
- No. of series: 1
- No. of episodes: 10

Production
- Camera setup: Multi-camera
- Running time: 46 minutes
- Production companies: South Shore Productions; Talpa

Original release
- Network: ITV1
- Release: 4 January 2026 – present

The Floor is a British game show which premiered on ITV on 4 January 2026 that is based on the Dutch game show with the same name. Hosted by Rob Brydon, the series is an adaptation of the Dutch format created by John de Mol. Contestants challenge adjacent opponents in timed duels, aiming to take over their squares and expand their territory. Players must then choose whether to go on the offensive to try and gain more territory or let The Floor choose a new challenger. The game progresses as players choose opponents and categories, with the ultimate goal of controlling the entire floor to win the grand prize of £50,000.

== Production ==
The show was ordered in August 2025, becoming the 25th territory to adopt the format. The following month, Welsh comedian Rob Brydon was announced as the host.

In December 2025, The Voice UK was absent from ITV's January line-up, leading TV Zone UK to speculate if The Floor would inherit the Sunday night slot held by the cancelled Dancing on Ice. The Floor debuted on 4 January 2026.

On 22 February 2026, the show was renewed for a second series and applications for this were opened. Filming for the second series took place in June 2026, this time featuring 90 contestants.

The second series is scheduled to air in early 2027.

== Format ==
Contestants stand on separate square spaces of a large grid on the studio floor (a 9x9 grid). Each contestant has a category in which they feel particularly knowledgeable. For the second series, the show features 90 contestants.

One contestant is chosen at random to be a challenger and shown the categories of all opponents whose territories share at least one side with their own, then chooses one of them to challenge face-to-face in a head-to-head duel. The specifics of the duel remain undisclosed until the challenger selects an opponent, with the format defaulting to visual unless specified otherwise by the host. The two contestants take turns identifying a series of images or words associated with the challenged opponent's category. They are each given separate 45-second clocks, only one of which runs at any given time, starting with the challenger. The contestant in control must give a correct answer in order to stop their clock and turn control over to their opponent. Infinite guesses are allowed without penalty, and a contestant may pass whenever desired; however, they must wait three seconds for a new image or text to be shown. Some categories are text-based, requiring contestants to perform tasks such as filling in the missing word(s) of a book title or song lyric, or naming the movie from which a famous quote is taken.The second season would introduce audio categories.

The first contestant to run out of time is eliminated from the game and gives up all of their territory to the winner, who inherits the challenger's category or keeps their own (if the challenger, since each category may only be played once).The winner may then either challenge another opponent or return to the grid; in the latter case, a new contestant is selected as a challenger at random from those who have not yet played a duel. Once all the remaining contestants have played a duel at least once, everyone becomes eligible for selection as a challenger. When only two contestants remain, The final duel is played as a best-of-three, with the first contestant to win two rounds declared the champion. Each remaining category is used for one of the first two rounds only. The contestant in control only selects which of the two known remaining categories will be played first (they will be the challenger in the first round, while the winner of the first round is the challenger in the second). If a third round is necessary, it will be played with a mystery category. The contestant who goes first will be the one with the most territory.

The game progresses over the course of a series with the grand prize awarded to the player who ultimately controls the entire floor. Secondary prizes are awarded throughout the series to the player with the most territory at the end of each episode after a certain number of duels. At the end of each episode, apart from the final episode, the contestant holding the most territory wins £5,000. In the event of a tie, the leaders share the money equally. The last contestant standing at the end of the final episode of the series takes over the entire floor and wins the grand prize of £50,000. The overall prize pot in the series is £95,000.

Contestants who achieve three consecutive duel victories (by electing to play on twice after a win) are awarded a five-second "Time Boost." This bonus can be added once to the contestant's clock at the start of any subsequent duel (including the best of 3 final duel). A contestant in possession of a Time Boost must elect to use it before a duel starts before beginning to earn another. If a duel is won with a Time Boost, it is counted as the first win towards another.

== Results by contestant ==
Original categories are listed first & shown in boldface. Inherited categories are listed after the original category without boldface. A hyphen indicates a more specific topic in the associated category. The specific topic is italicized. Parentheses indicate what a category refers to if a colloquial phrase; it also specifies the category's style of play if specified to be non-visual or text-based (audio, association, etc.). Brackets [] indicate the remaining words of a topic that have had their title shortened.

Results (Series 1)
Name	Job	City	Age	Category	Space Assignment	Duels	Duels Played	Episodes Won	Exited
Shivanni Koli	Social Media Manager	Dundee	27	**World Foods**	59	1. Family Movies - Sherine defeats Shivanni (Ep. 1)	1	N/A	Episode 1
Joe Billing	Police Officer	Halifax	36	**Cricketers**	17	2. Great Britons - Stephen defeats Joe (Ep. 1)	1	N/A	Episode 1
Tony	Technician	Sheffield	51	**Detective Shows**	12	3. Board & Card Games - Georgina defeats Tony (Ep. 1)	1	N/A	Episode 1
Georgina Green	Funeral Director	Rotherham	36	**Board & Card Games**; Detective Shows	13	3. Board & Card Games - Georgina defeats Tony (Ep. 1); 4. Romcoms - Sophie defeats Georgina (Ep. 1)	2	N/A	Episode 1
David Newson	Cyber Security Specialist	Haddenham, Buckinghamshire	48	**Action Movies**	1	5. Mythology - Florence defeats David (Ep. 1)	1	N/A	Episode 1
Florence	English Literature Graduate	Kent	22	**Mythology**; Action Movies	2	5. Mythology - Florence defeats David (Ep. 1); 6. Airport Codes - Favour defeats Florence (Ep. 1)	2	N/A	Episode 1
Favour	Customer Service	Glasgow	29	**Airport Codes**; Action Movies	11	6. Airport Codes - Favour defeats Florence (Ep. 1); 7. Chocolate - Steff defeats Favour (Ep. 1)	2	N/A	Episode 1
Daniyaal	Stylist	London Borough of Tower Hamlets	26	**Fashion Icons**	71	8. Fashion Icons - Vicky defeats Daniyaal (Ep. 1)	1	N/A	Episode 1
Quintin Young	Semi-Retired Creative Director	Brighton	66	**Desserts**	44	9. Desserts - Luke defeats Quintin (Ep. 2)	1	N/A	Episode 2
Asanda Jezile	Singer	Enfield, London	24	**Gen Z**	41	10. Moguls - Azheemah defeats Asanda (Ep. 2)	1	N/A	Episode 2
Hawa Kamara	Events Coordinator	Croydon	36	**Fruit**	65	11. Fruit - Christy defeats Hawa (Ep. 2)	1	N/A	Episode 2
Cem Ahmet	Key Account Manager	Wilmslow	41	**Sea Creatures**	61	12. Friends - Ben defeats Cem (Ep. 2)	1	N/A	Episode 2
Ben Crouch	Barista	Loughborough	26	**Friends**; Sea Creatures	62	12. Friends - Ben defeats Cem (Ep. 2); 13. Musicals - Vicky defeats Ben (Ep. 2)	2	N/A	Episode 2
Vicky	Scrum Master	Cardiff	55	**Musicals**; Sea Creatures	72	8. Fashion Icons - Vicky defeats Daniyaal (Ep. 1); 13. Musicals - Vicky defeats Ben (Ep. 2); 14. Crisps - Deep defeats Vicky (Ep. 2)	3	N/A	Episode 2
Jag Wattley	Firefighter	Bexley	30	**Cartoon Characters**	14	15. Cartoon Characters - Zi defeats Jag (Ep. 2)	1	N/A	Episode 2
Sophie Tay	Civil Servant	Liverpool	32	**Romcoms**; Detective Shows	22	4. Romcoms - Sophie defeats Georgina (Ep. 1); 16. Detective Shows - Zi defeats Sophie (Ep. 2)	2	N/A	Episode 2
Steffan "Steff" Squire	Personal Assistant	Andover, Hampshire	57	**Chocolate**; Action Movies	20	7. Chocolate - Steff defeats Favour (Ep. 1); 17. Action Movies - Zi defeats Steff (Ep. 3)	2	Episode 1; 4 spaces (£5,000)	Episode 3
Jess Hobson	Singing Teacher	Sheffield	34	**Villains**	46	18. Flags - Conna defeats Jess (Ep. 3)	1	N/A	Episode 3
Kate	Author	Southampton	57	**Rappers**	56	19. Rappers - Conna defeats Kate (Ep. 3)	1	N/A	Episode 3
Louise Hunt Skelley	Paralympian & Broadcaster	Swindon	34	**Tennis Players**	77	20. Creepy Crawlies - Harry defeats Louise (Ep. 3)	1	N/A	Episode 3
Jennie Scott	Train Driver	Aberdeen	50	**Train Stations**	34	21. Logos - Laura defeats Jennie (Ep. 3)	1	N/A	Episode 3
Toby	Revenue Protection Officer	Kent	51	**International Venues**	4	22. UK Counties - Zi defeats Toby (Ep. 3)	1	N/A	Episode 3
Siobhan Élouise	Musician	London	36	**Glastonbury**	38	23. Superheroes - Alan defeats Sibohan (Ep. 3)	1	N/A	Episode 3
Thomas Chewy Hewitt	Children's Care Practitioner	Flintshire	32	**World Politics**	63	24. Sea Creatures - Deep defeats Tom (Ep. 3)	1	N/A	Episode 3
Deep Singh	Sales & Marketing Consultant	Derby	42	**Crisps**; Sea Creatures; World Politics	70	14. Crisps - Deep defeats Vicky (Ep. 2); 24. Sea Creatures - Deep defeats Tom (Ep. 3); 25. The Olympics - Ruby defeats Deep (Ep. 4)	3	Split Episode 2; 5 spaces (£2,500)	Episode 4
Sherine Medley	Dance Teacher	Hounslow	47	**Family Movies**; World Foods	58	1. Family Movies - Sherine defeats Shivanni (Ep. 1); 26. World Foods - Ruby defeats Sherine (Ep. 4)	2	N/A	Episode 4
Ruby Fox-Barrie	Personal Trainer	Glasgow	29	**The Olympics**; World Politics	60	25. The Olympics - Ruby defeats Deep (Ep. 4); 26. World Foods - Ruby defeats Sherine (Ep. 4); 27. Toys - Lynda V defeats Ruby (Ep. 4)	3	N/A	Episode 4
Lynda V	Children's Nurse	Manchester	39	**Toys**; World Politics	80	27. Toys - Lynda V defeats Ruby (Ep. 4); 28. Footballers - Juliette defeats Lynda V (Ep. 4)	2	N/A	Episode 4
Ross Andrews	Content Creator	Pontypool	31	**Pop Groups**	27	29. The Periodic Table - Rosy defeats Ross (Ep. 4)	1	N/A	Episode 4
Harvey Dench	Mortgage Advisor	Newcastle upon Tyne	28	**Comedians**	35	30. Comedians - Rosy defeats Harvey (Ep. 4)	1	N/A	Episode 4
Luke	Primary School Teacher	Cornwall	38	**Children's Books**	45	9. Desserts - Luke defeats Quintin (Ep. 2); 31. Children's Books - Rosy defeats Luke (Ep. 4)	2	N/A	Episode 4
Rich	Property Lettings	Lewisham	30	**Space**	32	32. Space - James defeats Rich (Ep. 4)	1	N/A	Episode 4
Juliette Taylor	Podcast Host	Newcastle upon Tyne	24	**Footballers**; World Politics	81	28. Footballers - Juliette defeats Lynda V (Ep. 4); 33. World Politics - Mackenzie defeats Juliette (Ep. 5)	2	Episode 4; 11 spaces (£5,000)	Episode 5
Harry Bleakley	Bartender	Wolverhampton	19	**Creepy Crawlies**; Tennis Players	68	20. Creepy Crawlies - Harry defeats Louise (Ep. 3); 34. Tennis Players - Mackenzie defeats Harry B (Ep. 5)	2	N/A	Episode 5
Ayesha Parmar	Bar Manager	Poulton-Le-Fylde	29	**Famous Hair**	21	35. Famous Hair - George defeats Ayesha (Ep. 5)	1	N/A	Episode 5
Rosy Harrison	Anaesthetist	Birmingham	32	**The Periodic Table**; Pop Groups	26	29. The Periodic Table - Rosy defeats Ross (Ep. 4); 30. Comedians - Rosy defeats Harvey (Ep. 4); 31. Children's Books - Rosy defeats Luke (Ep. 4); 36. Pop Groups - Katie defeats Rosy (Ep. 5)	4	N/A	Episode 5
Shelley Stephens	Property Manager	Hampshire	54	**'80s Icons**	54	37. '80s Icons - Katie defeats Shelley (Ep. 5)	1	N/A	Episode 5
Lucy Titheridge	Retired Nurse	Lyme Regis	51	**Newsreaders**	5	38. International Venues - Zi defeats Lucy T (Ep. 5)	1	N/A	Episode 5
Dan Bennett	Personal Trainer	Stroud	29	**Sports Teams**	48	39. Endangered Animals - Aimee defeats Dan (Ep. 5)	1	N/A	Episode 5
Aimee Louise	Senior Pensions Officer	Wiltshire	23	**Endangered Animals**; Sports Teams	47	39. Endangered Animals - Aimee defeats Dan (Ep. 5); 40. Glastonbury - Alan defeats Aimee (Ep. 5)	2	N/A	Episode 5
Conna Chahal	Influencer	Coventry	24	**Flags**; Villains	55	18. Flags - Conna defeats Jess (Ep. 3); 19. Rappers - Conna defeats Kate (Ep. 3); 41. Villains - Alan defeats Conna (Ep. 6)	3	N/A	Episode 6
Paul Jones	Operations Manager	Birmingham	55	**Retro Tech**	57	42. Retro Tech - Alan defeats Paul (Ep. 6)	1	N/A	Episode 6
Alan Holloway	Comic Writer	Weston-Super-Mare	56	**Superheroes**; Glastonbury; Sports Teams	37	23. Superheroes - Alan defeats Sibohan (Ep. 3); 40. Glastonbury - Alan defeats Aimee (Ep. 5); 41. Villains - Alan defeats Conna (Ep. 6); 42. Retro Tech - Alan defeats Paul (Ep. 6); 43. History Makers - Mackenzie defeats Alan (Ep. 6)	5	N/A	Episode 6
Maddie Luckes	Lash Technician	Swindon	27	**The Beatles**	19	44. Yoga - Ems defeats Maddie (Ep. 6)	1	N/A	Episode 6
Jake Chamberlain	Vehicle Technician	Somerset	29	**Cars**	29	45. Cars - Ems defeats Jake (Ep. 6)	1	N/A	Episode 6
Ems Harding	Yoga Teacher	London Borough of Brent	34	**Yoga**; The Beatles	28	44. Yoga - Ems defeats Maddie (Ep. 6); 45. Cars - Ems defeats Jake (Ep. 6); 46. Team GB - Helen defeat Ems (Ep. 6)	3	N/A	Episode 6
Chie Bad	Musician	Manchester	24	**Radio Hosts**	50	47. Beauty - James A defeats Chie (Ep. 6)	1	N/A	Episode 6
Zi Khan	Marketing Manager	Doncaster	57	**UK Counties**; International Venues; Newsreaders	15	15. Cartoon Characters - Zi defeats Jag (Ep. 2); 16. Detective Shows - Zi defeats Sophie (Ep. 2); 17. Action Movies - Zi defeats Steff (Ep. 3); 22. UK Counties - Zi defeats Toby (Ep. 3); 38. International Venues - Zi defeats Lucy T (Ep. 5); 48. Newsreaders - Lynne defeats Zi (Ep. 6)	6	Split Episode 2; 5 spaces Episode 3; 10 spaces (£7,500)	Episode 6
Caolan Brady	Insurance Claims Handler	Armagh	29	**World Landmarks**	42	49. World Landmarks - Jeevan defeats Caolan (Ep. 7)	1	N/A	Episode 7
Victoria	English Teacher	Banbridge	48	**Classic Literature**	75	50. Classic Literature - Chlo defeats Victoria (Ep. 7)	1	N/A	Episode 7
Lorna Helton	Psychologist	Prestwick	49	**Best Picture Winners** - The Oscars	9	51. Soap Characters - Katie defeats Lorna (Ep. 7)	1	N/A	Episode 7
Michelle Morley	Psychic Medium	Woking	56	**Birds**	73	52. Birds - Gemma defeats Michelle (Ep. 7)	1	N/A	Episode 7
Leigh Burns	Retail Shift Manager	Topsham	34	**Video Games**	52	53. Sports Teams - Mackenzie defeats Leigh (Ep. 7)	1	N/A	Episode 7
Dom Atkins	Theatre Tech	Colchester	53	**Sci-Fi**	16	54. Eurovision - Lynne defeats Dom (Ep. 7)	1	N/A	Episode 7
Lynne Bobs	Therapist	Warrington	53	**Eurovision**; Sci-Fi	24	48. Newsreaders - Lynne defeats Zi (Ep. 6); 54. Eurovision - Lynne defeats Dom (Ep. 7); 55. The Beatles - Helen defeats Lynne (Ep. 7)	3	N/A	Episode 7
Harry Smith	Farmer	Aberdeen	20	**Farming**	51	56. Video Games - Mackenzie defeats Harry S (Ep. 7)	1	N/A	Episode 7
Helen L Davies	Welsh Language Specialist	Wales	53	**Team GB**; The Beatles; Sci-Fi	10	46. Team GB - Helen defeat Ems (Ep. 6); 55. The Beatles - Helen defeats Lynne (Ep. 7); 57. Sci-Fi - Indie defeats Helen (Ep. 8)	3	N/A	Episode 8
Ellie Rose	Marketing Director	Stratford-upon-Avon	29	**Child Stars**	78	58. Child Stars - Lucy W defeats Ellie (Ep. 8)	1	N/A	Episode 8
Carol James	Retired Sales Assistant	Newport	67	**Dogs**	31	59. Musical Instruments - Indie defeats Katie (Ep. 8)	1	N/A	Episode 8
Azheemah Awoyemi	Fraud Analyst	Milton Keynes	23	**Moguls**; Gen Z	40	10. Moguls - Azheemah defeats Asanda (Ep. 2); 60. Gen Z - Indie defeats Azeemah (Ep. 8)	2	N/A	Episode 8
Mackenzie Watson	Quizmaster	Glasgow	31	**History Makers**; Sports Teams; Video Games; Farming	67	33. World Politics - Mackenzie defeats Juliette (Ep. 5); 34. Tennis Players - Mackenzie defeats Harry B (Ep. 5); 43. History Makers - Mackenzie defeats Alan (Ep. 6); 53. Sports Teams - Mackenzie defeats Leigh (Ep. 7); 56. Video Games - Mackenzie defeats Harry S (Ep. 7); 61. Farming - Indie defeats Mackenzie (Ep. 8)	6	Episode 5; 14 spaces Episode 6; 22 spaces Episode 7; 24 spaces (£15,000)	Episode 8
Linda Cotton	Retired Headteacher	Rochdale	67	**Plants & Flowers**	36	62. Best Picture Winners - Katie defeats Linda C (Ep. 8)	1	N/A	Episode 8
Indie Shah	Waitress	St Albans	19	**Musical Instruments**; Dogs	7	57. Sci-Fi - Indie defeats Helen (Ep. 8); 59. Musical Instruments - Indie defeats Carol (Ep. 8); 60. Gen Z - Indie defeats Azeemah (Ep. 8); 61. Farming - Indie defeats Mackenzie (Ep. 8); 63. Dogs - Katie defeats Indie (Ep. 8)	5	N/A	Episode 8
James Allen	Dental Nurse	Newport, Wales	28	**Beauty**; Radio Hosts	49	47. Beauty - James A defeats Chie (Ep. 6); 64. Radio Hosts - Katie defeats James A (Ep. 8)	2	N/A	Episode 8
Jessica Katanga	Doctor & Content Creator	Leicester	28	**I'm A Celebrity... [Get Me Out of Here]**	66	65. Anatomy - Christy defeats Jessica (Ep. 9)	1	N/A	Episode 9
Pete	Close Protection Security	Tyne & Wear	53	**James Bond**	79	66. Reality TV - Lucy W defeats Pete (Ep. 9)	1	N/A	Episode 9
Sarah	Military Veteran	North Yorkshire	53	**Sitcoms**	33	67. Train Stations - Laura defeats Sarah (Ep. 9)	1	N/A	Episode 9
Emily Cossey	Yacht Charter Broker	London	27	**Countries**	53	68. Plants & Flowers - Katie defeats Emily (Ep. 9)	1	N/A	Episode 9
Laura Shopper	Retail Manager	Croydon	40	**Logos**; Train Stations; Sitcoms	25	21. Logos - Laura defeats Jennie (Ep. 3); 67. Train Stations - Laura defeats Sarah (Ep. 9); 69. Sitcoms - Katie defeats Laura (Ep. 9)	3	N/A	Episode 9
Elisha Mac	DJ	Glasgow	31	**UK Number Ones**	3	70. UK Number Ones - Katie defeats Elisha (Ep. 9)	1	N/A	Episode 9
Christy Varghese	Doctor	Finchley	29	**Anatomy**; I'm A Celebrity... [Get Me Out of Here]	74	11. Fruit - Christy defeats Hawa (Ep. 2); 65. Anatomy - Christy defeats Jessica (Ep. 9); 71. I'm A Celebrity... - Katie defeats Christy (Ep. 9)	3	N/A	Episode 9
Chlo Spinks	Musician	Camden	27	**Rock & Roll Hall of Fame**	76	50. Classic Literature - Chlo defeats Victoria (Ep. 7); 72. Rock & Roll Hall of Fame - Katie defeats Chlo (Ep. 9)	2	N/A	Episode 9
Katie Roff	Charity Manager	Rotherhithe	37	**Soap Characters**; Best Picture Winners - The Oscars; Plants & Flowers; Countries	18	36. Pop Groups - Katie defeats Rosy (Ep. 5); 37. '80s Icons - Katie defeats Shelley (Ep. 5); 51. Soap Characters - Katie defeats Lorna (Ep. 7); 62. Best Picture Winners - Katie defeats Linda C (Ep. 8); 63. Dogs - Katie defeats Indie (Ep. 8); 64. Radio Hosts - Katie defeats James A (Ep. 8); 68. Plants & Flowers - Katie defeats Emily (Ep. 9); 69. Sitcoms - Katie defeats Laura (Ep. 9); 70. UK Number Ones - Katie defeats Elisha (Ep. 9); 71. I'm A Celebrity... - Katie defeats Christy (Ep. 9); 72. Rock & Roll Hall of Fame - Katie defeats Chlo (Ep. 9); 73. Countries - Jadon defeats Katie (Ep. 10)	12	Episode 8; 56 spaces Episode 9; 66 spaces (£10,000)	Episode 10
Andrew Magz	Personal Chef	Hitchin	32	**Potatoes**	39	74. US States - George defeats Magz (Ep. 10)	1	N/A	Episode 10
James Pearson	Finance Director	Petworth	57	**Formula 1**	23	32. Space - James P defeats Rich (Ep. 4); 75. Fighters - Jadon defeats James P (Ep. 10)	2	N/A	Episode 10
Jadon Prior	Professional Boxer	Southampton	21	**Fighters**; Formula 1	6	73. Countries - Jadon defeats Katie (Ep. 10); 75. Fighters - Jadon defeats James P (Ep. 10); 76. Smartphone Apps - Gemma defeats Jadon (Ep. 10)	3	N/A	Episode 10
Gemma Louisianna	Social Media Manager	Wimbledon	33	**Smartphone Apps**; Formula 1	64	52. Birds - Gemma defeats Michelle (Ep. 7); 76. Smartphone Apps - Gemma defeats Jadon (Ep. 10); 77. Potatoes - George defeats Gemma (Ep. 10)	3	N/A	Episode 10
Jeevan Swamy	GP	Birmingham	34	**The Stock Market**	43	49. World Landmarks - Jeevan defeats Caolan (Ep. 7); 78. The Stock Market - George defeats Jeevan (Ep. 10)	2	N/A	Episode 10
George Daniel	Bagel and Burrito Artist	Cardiff	22	**US States**; Potatoes; Formula 1	30	35. Famous Hair - George defeats Ayesha (Ep. 5); 74. US States - George defeats Magz (Ep. 10); 77. Potatoes - George defeats Gemma (Ep. 10); 78. The Stock Market - George defeats Jeevan (Ep. 10); 79. Formula 1 - Stephen defeats George (Ep. 10)	5	N/A	Episode 10
Lucy Warway	Musical Theatre Performer	Rochester	29	**Reality TV**; James Bond	69	58. Child Stars - Lucy W defeats Ellie (Ep. 8); 66. Reality TV - Lucy W defeats Pete (Ep. 9); 80. James Bond - Lucy W defeats Stephen (1-0) (Ep. 10); 81. Cricketers - Stephen defeats Lucy W (1-1) (Ep. 10); 82. UK Tourist Attractions - Stephen defeats Lucy W (1-2) (Ep. 10)	5	N/A	Episode 10
Stephen Stanley	Political Advisor	Wrexham	26	**Great Britons**; Cricketers	8	2. Great Britons - Stephen defeats Joe (Ep. 1); 79. Formula 1 - Stephen defeats George (Ep. 10); 80. James Bond - Lucy W defeats Stephen (0-1) (Ep. 10); 81. Cricketers - Stephen defeats Lucy W (1-1) (Ep. 10); 82. UK Tourist Attractions - Stephen defeats Lucy W (2-1) (Ep. 10)	5	**Series Winner** **(£50,000)**	

== Duels ==
Contestant won the duel
Contestant lost the duel and was eliminated
Contestant was the runner-up
Contestant won the series
Contestant won the duel and a time boost
Contestant used the time boost and won
Contestant used the time boost and lost

Week 1 (4 January 2026): Top 81 — (8 duels)

First episode results
Duel No.	Challenger	Category	Challenged	Winner's Time	Spaces Won (Total)	Choice
1	Shivanni	Family Movies	Sherine	12 seconds left	1 space (2 total)	Floor
2	Joe	Great Britons	Stephen	8 seconds left	1 space (2 total)	Floor
3	Tony	Board & Card Games	Georgina	13 seconds left	1 space (2 total)	Continued
4	Georgina	Rom-coms	Sophie	3 seconds left	2 spaces (3 total)	Floor
5	David	Mythology	Florence	27 seconds left	1 space (2 total)	Continued
6	Florence	Airport Codes	Favour	9 seconds left	2 spaces (3 total)	Continued
7	Favour	Chocolate	Steff	20 seconds left	3 spaces (4 total)	Floor
8	Vicky	Fashion Icons	Daniyaal	38 seconds left	1 space (2 total)	Floor

Week 2 (11 January 2026): Top 73 — (8 duels)

Second episode results
Duel No.	Challenger	Category	Challenged	Winner's Time	Spaces Won (Total)	Choice
9	Luke	Desserts	Quintin	18 seconds left	1 space (2 total)	Floor
10	Asanda	Moguls	Azheemah	43 seconds left	1 space (2 total)	Floor
11	Christy	Fruit	Hawa	27 seconds left	1 space (2 total)	Floor
12	Cem	Friends	Ben	37 seconds left	1 space (2 total)	Continued
13	Ben	Musicals	Vicky	30 seconds left	2 spaces (4 total)	Continued
14	Vicky	Crisps	Deep	36 seconds left	4 spaces (5 total)	Floor
15	Zi	Cartoon Characters	Jag	23 seconds left	1 space (2 total)	Continued
16	Zi	Detective Shows (Inherited)	Sophie	33 seconds left	3 spaces (5 total)	Continued

Week 3 (18 January 2026): Top 65 — (8 duels)

Third episode results
Duel No.	Challenger	Category	Challenged	Winner's Time	Spaces Won (Total)	Choice
17	Zi	Action Movies (Inherited)	Steff	36 seconds left	4 spaces (9 total)	Floor
18	Jess H	Flags	Conna	15 seconds left	1 space (2 total)	Continued
19	Conna	Rappers	Kate	35 seconds left	1 space (3 total)	Floor
20	Louise	Creepy Crawlies	Harry B	14 seconds left	1 space (2 total)	Floor
21	Jennie	Logos	Laura	21 seconds left	1 space (2 total)	Floor
22	Toby	UK Counties	Zi (Note: Zi chose to save the time boost for a later duel.)	31 seconds left	1 space (10 total)	Floor
23	Siobhan	Superheroes	Alan	7 seconds left	1 space (2 total)	Floor
24	Tom	Sea Creatures (Inherited)	Deep	32 seconds left	1 space (6 total)	Continued

Week 4 (25 January 2026): Top 57 — (8 duels)

Fourth episode results
Duel No.	Challenger	Category	Challenged	Winner's Time	Spaces Won (Total)	Choice
25	Deep	The Olympics	Ruby	6 seconds left	6 spaces (7 total)	Continued
26	Ruby	World Foods (Inherited)	Sherine	15 seconds left	2 spaces (9 total)	Continued
27	Ruby	Toys	Lynda V	9 seconds left	9 spaces (10 total)	Continued
28	Lynda V	Footballers	Juliette	23 seconds left	10 spaces (11 total)	Floor
29	Ross	Periodic Table	Rosy	29 seconds left	1 space (2 total)	Continued
30	Rosy	Comedians	Harvey	32 seconds left	1 space (3 total)	Continued
31	Rosy	Children's Books	Luke	19 seconds left	2 spaces (5 total)	Floor
32	James P	Space	Rich	15 seconds left	1 space (2 total)	Floor

Week 5 (1 February 2026): Top 49 — (8 duels)

Fifth episode results
Duel No.	Challenger	Category	Challenged	Winner's Time	Spaces Won (Total)	Choice
33	Mackenzie	World Politics (Inherited)	Juliette	25 seconds left	11 spaces (12 total)	Continued
34	Mackenzie	Tennis Players (Inherited)	Harry B.	32 seconds left	2 spaces (14 total)	Floor
35	George	Famous Hair	Ayesha	21 seconds left	1 space (2 total)	Floor
36	Katie	Pop Groups (Inherited)	Rosy	15 seconds left	5 spaces (6 total)	Continued
37	Katie	80's Icons	Shelley	24 seconds left	1 space (7 total)	Floor
38	Lucy T	International Venues (Inherited)	Zi	26 seconds left	1 space (11 total)	Floor
39	Dan	Endangered Animals	Aimee	13 seconds left	1 space (2 total)	Continued
40	Aimee	Glastonbury (Inherited)	Alan	25 seconds left	2 spaces (4 total)	Continued

Week 6 (8 February 2026): Top 41 — (8 duels)

Sixth episode results
Duel No.	Challenger	Category	Challenged	Winner's Time	Spaces Won (Total)	Choice
41	Alan	Villains (Inherited)	Conna	26 seconds left	3 spaces (7 total)	Continued
42	Alan	Retro Tech	Paul	1 second left	1 space (8 total)	Continued
43	Alan	History Makers	Mackenzie	16 seconds left	8 spaces (22 total)	Floor
44	Maddie	Yoga	Ems	38 seconds left	1 space (2 total)	Continued
45	Ems	Cars	Jake	17 seconds left	1 space (3 total)	Continued
46	Ems	Team GB	Helen	11 seconds left	3 spaces (4 total)	Floor
47	Chie	Beauty	James A	13 seconds left	1 space (2 total)	Floor
48	Lynne	Newsreaders (Inherited)	Zi	33 seconds left	11 spaces (12 total)	Floor

Week 7 (15 February 2026): Top 33 — (8 duels)

Seventh episode results
Duel No.	Challenger	Category	Challenged	Winner's Time	Spaces Won (Total)	Choice
49	Jeevan	World Landmarks	Caolan	20 seconds left	1 space (2 total)	Floor
50	Chlo	Classic Literature	Victoria	16 seconds left	1 space (2 total)	Floor
51	Lorna	Soap Characters	Katie	5 seconds left	1 space (8 total)	Floor
52	Gemma	Birds	Michelle	12 seconds left	1 space (2 total)	Floor
53	Leigh	Sports Teams (Inherited)	Mackenzie	27 seconds left	1 space (23 total)	Floor
54	Dom	Eurovision	Lynne	10 seconds left	1 space (13 total)	Continued
55	Lynne	The Beatles	Helen	26 seconds left	13 spaces (17 total)	Floor
56	Harry S	Video Games (Inherited)	Mackenzie	36 seconds left	1 space (24 total)	Floor

Week 8 (22 February 2026): Top 25 — (8 duels)

Eighth episode results
Duel No.	Challenger	Category	Challenged	Winner's Time	Spaces Won (Total)	Choice
57	Indie	Sci-Fi (Inherited)	Helen	14 seconds left	17 spaces (18 total)	Floor
58	Lucy W	Child Stars	Ellie	19 seconds left	1 space (2 total)	Floor
59	Carol	Musical Instruments	Indie	31 seconds left	1 space (19 total)	Continued
60	Indie	Gen Z (Inherited)	Azeemah	38 seconds left	2 spaces (21 total)	Continued
61	Indie	Farming (Inherited)	Mackenzie	10 seconds left	24 spaces (45 total)	Floor
62	Linda C	Best Picture Winners - The Oscars (Inherited)	Katie	29 seconds left	1 space (9 total)	Continued
63	Katie	Dogs	Indie	18 seconds left	45 spaces (54 total)	Continued
64	Katie	Radio Hosts (Inherited)	James A	22 seconds left	2 spaces (56 total)	Floor

Week 9 (1 March 2026): Top 17 — (8 duels)

Ninth episode results
Duel No.	Challenger	Category	Challenged	Winner's Time	Spaces Won (Total)	Choice
65	Jessica	Anatomy	Christy	4 seconds left	1 space (3 total)	Floor
66	Pete	Reality TV	Lucy W	43 seconds left	1 space (3 total)	Floor
67	Sarah	Train Stations (Inherited)	Laura	44 seconds left	1 space (3 total)	Floor
68	Emily	Plants & Flowers (Inherited)	Katie	44 seconds left	1 space (57 total)	Continued
69	Katie	Sitcoms (Inherited)	Laura	38 seconds left	3 spaces (60 total)	Continued
70	Katie	UK Number Ones	Elisha	22 seconds left	1 space (61 total)	Continued
71	Katie (Note: Katie chose to save the time boost for a later duel in duels 68-71.)	I'm a Celebrity...(Get Me Out of Here)	Christy	35 seconds left	3 spaces (64 total)	Continued
72	Katie	Rock & Roll Hall of Fame	Chlo	2 seconds left	2 spaces (66 total)	Floor

Week 10 (8 March 2026): Top 9 — (10 duels)

Tenth episode results
Duel No.	Challenger	Category	Challenged	Winner's Time	Spaces Won (Total)	Choice	Final Duel Score
73	Jadon	Countries (Inherited)	Katie	38 seconds left	66 spaces (67 total)	Floor	N/A
74 (Note: Magz was the last contestant remaining with a one-square territory. Therefore, he was selected by default to play. From this point on, all the remaining players became eligible for the randomizer at any time.)	Magz	US States	George	2 seconds left	1 space (3 total)	Floor	N/A
75	James P	Fighters	Jadon	25 seconds left	2 spaces (69 total)	Continued	N/A
76	Jadon	Smartphone Apps	Gemma	19 seconds left	69 spaces (71 total)	Continued	N/A
77	Gemma	Potatoes (Inherited)	George	17 seconds left	71 spaces (74 total)	Continued	N/A
78	George	The Stock Market	Jeevan	9 seconds left	2 spaces (76 total)	Floor	N/A
79	Stephen	Formula 1 (Inherited)	George	42 seconds left	76 spaces (78 total)	Duel Choice: James Bond, then Cricketers	N/A
80	Stephen	James Bond (Inherited)	Lucy W	42 seconds left	N/A	N/A	0-1
81	Lucy W	Cricketers (Inherited)	Stephen	38 seconds left	N/A	N/A	1-1
82	Stephen	UK Tourist Attractions (Tiebreaker)	Lucy W	18 seconds left	3 spaces (81 total)	N/A	2-1

== Series overview ==
Series	Episodes	Originally released	
Series	Episodes	First released	Last released
1	10	4 January 2026	8 March 2026
2	TBA	January 2027	March 2027

== Episodes ==
Winners of individual duels are shown in boldface shown as Challenger (randomized or choosing to play on)/Defender (chosen by challenger).

=== Series 1 (2026) ===
Time boosts earned in Italics. Time boosts used shown in Underline.

No.	Title	Original release date	UK Viewers (Total)
1	"Episode 1"	4 January 2026	1,900,000
Rob Brydon hosts a game show in which 81 contestants compete in head-to-head in quick-fire duels for a grand prize of £50,000.: Duels played (8): Shivanni vs. **Sherine** (Family Movies), Joe vs. **Stephen** (Great Britons), Tony vs. **Georgina** (Board & Card Games), Georgina vs. **Sophie** (Rom-coms), David vs. **Florence** (Mythology), Florence vs. **Favour** (Airport Codes), Favour vs. **Steff** (Chocolate), **Vicky** vs. Daniyaal (Fashion Icons); Episode winner: Steff (4 spaces)
2	"Episode 2"	11 January 2026	1,900,000
The last 73 remaining contestants fight for even more squares in the competition for the £50,000 jackpot as rivals emerge and the floor begins to take shape.: Duels played (8): **Luke** vs. Quntin (Desserts), Asanda vs. **Azheemah** (Moguls), **Christy** vs. Hawa (Fruit), Cem vs. **Ben** (Friends), Ben vs. **Vicky** (Musicals), Vicky vs. **Deep** (Crisps), **Zi** vs. Jag (Cartoon Characters), **Zi** vs. Sophie (Detective Shows); Episode winners: Deep & Zi (5 spaces each)
3	"Episode 3"	18 January 2026	1,800,000
With just 65 contestants left, another round of quiz duels has the competition heating up as rivals close in on each other.: Duels played (8): **Zi** vs. Steff (Action Movies), Jess vs. **Conna** (Flags), **Conna** vs. Kate (Rappers), Louise vs. **Harry B** (Creepy Crawlies), Jennie vs. **Laura** (Logos), Toby vs. **Zi** (UK Counties), Siobhan vs. **Alan** (Superheroes), Tom vs. **Deep** (Sea Creatures); Episode winner: Zi (10 spaces)
4	"Episode 4"	25 January 2026	1,800,000
Only 57 contestants remain as the duels get sharper and the competition starts heating up on the road to £50,000.: Duels played (8): Deep vs. **Ruby** (The Olympics), **Ruby** vs. Sherine (World Foods), Ruby vs. **Lynda V** (Toys), Lynda V vs. **Juliette** (Footballers), Ross vs. **Rosy** (The Periodic Table), **Rosy** vs. Harvey (Comedians), **Rosy** vs. Luke (Children's Books), **James P** vs. Rich (Space); Episode winner: Juliette (11 spaces)
5	"Episode 5"	1 February 2026	1,700,000
With only 49 contestants to duel for more squares, with the survivors reaching the halfway point of the competition.: Duels played (8): **Mackenzie** vs. Juliette (World Politics), **Mackenzie** vs. Harry B (Tennis Players), **George** vs. Ayesha (Famous Hair), **Katie** vs. Rosy (Pop Groups), **Katie** vs. Shelley ('80s Icons), Lucy T vs. **Zi** (International Venues), Dan vs. **Aimee** (Endangered Animals), Aimee vs. **Alan** (Glastonbury); Episode winner: Mackenzie (14 spaces)
6	"Episode 6"	8 February 2026	1,500,000
In another round of trivia duels, the 41 remaining contestants attempt to conquer more squares and outwit each other to try and win £50,000.: Duels played (8): **Alan** vs. Conna (Villains), **Alan** vs. Paul (Retro Tech), Alan vs. **Mackenzie** (History Makers), Maddie vs. **Ems** (Yoga), **Ems** vs. Jake (Cars), Ems vs. **Helen** (Team GB), Chie vs **James A** (Beauty), **Lynne** vs Zi (Newsreaders); Episode winner: Mackenzie (22 spaces)
7	"Episode 7"	15 February 2026	1,600,000
The remaining 33 players are all on edge as the quick-fire trivia competition starts to reach its endgame.: Duels played (8): **Jeevan** vs. Caolan (World Landmarks), **Chlo** vs. Victoria (Classic Literature), Lorna vs. **Katie** (Soap Characters), **Gemma** vs. Michelle (Birds), Leigh vs. **Mackenzie** (Sports Teams), Dom vs. **Lynne** (Eurovision), Lynne vs. **Helen** (The Beatles), Harry S vs. **Mackenzie** (Video Games); Episode winner: Mackenzie (24 spaces)
8	"Episode 8"	22 February 2026	1,400,000
With 25 players left ahead of the semi-final, everyone left in play is looking for survival.: Duels played (8): **Indie** vs. Helen (Sci-Fi), **Lucy W** vs. Ellie (Child Stars), Carol vs. **Indie** (Musical Instruments), **Indie** vs. Azeemah (Gen Z), **Indie** vs. Mackenzie (Farming), Linda C vs. **Katie** (Best Picture Winners - **The Oscars**), **Katie** vs. Indie (Dogs), **Katie** vs. James A (Radio Hosts); Episode winner: Katie (56 spaces)
9	"Episode 9"	1 March 2026	1,600,000
The last 17 players fight for a place in the grand finale as the duels reach an epic climax and the pressure mounts.: Duels played (8): Jessica vs. **Christy** (Anatomy), Pete vs. **Lucy W** (Reality TV), Sarah vs. **Laura** (Train Stations), Emily vs. **Katie** (Plants & Flowers), **Katie** vs. Laura (Sitcoms), **Katie** vs. Elisha (UK Number Ones), **Katie** vs. Christy (I'm a Celebrity...), **Katie** vs. Chlo (Rock & Roll Hall of Fame); Episode winner: Katie (66 spaces)
10	"Episode 10"	8 March 2026	1,900,000
In the grand finale, all gloves are off as the 9 contestants left standing fight to conquer the floor and claim the grand prize of £50,000.: Duels played (10): **Jadon** vs. Katie (Countries), Magz vs. **George** (US States), James P vs. **Jadon** (Fighters), Jadon vs. **Gemma** (Smartphone Apps), Gemma vs. **George** (Potatoes), **George** vs. Jeevan (The Stock Market), **Stephen** vs. George (Formula 1), **Stephen** vs. Lucy W (James Bond: **Lucy W**, Cricketers: **Stephen**, UK Tourist Attractions: **Stephen**; final result: 2–1); Series winner: Stephen

== Reception ==
Rod Liddle of The Times considered that the specialist subjects were diverse and the eventual winner would have to have good general knowledge, but believed that too many subjects concerned television. Liddle predicted that the show would become popular.
