= Dolya Gavanski =

Serbian actress

- Occupations: Actor, director, producer
- Notable work: The Lesson, In the Land of Blood and Honey, Emmerdale, EastEnders, Natasha

Dolya Gavanski (Serbian: Доља Гавански) is an actress, director and producer.

== Biography ==
She grew up in several Eastern European countries and the UK. Having trained in drama in Moscow and London she went on to study at Cambridge University and Goldsmiths (University of London) where she obtained a PhD on Russian theatre and culture. While at Cambridge, she was active in the student drama scene and performed various plays at the Cambridge Arts Theatre.

She has acted in films, TV series and theatre plays, including several Shakespeare's dramas through to contemporary classics. She made her West End debut in Tom Stoppard's Rock N Roll, directed by Trevor Nunn, playing Lenka – a PhD student; her first television role was in Leonardo, where she played Mona Lisa opposite Mark Rylance for the BBC. She came to the further attention of critics in her role as the pianist Elena in David Greig's Damascus at the Traverse Theatre, an Edinburgh Festival hit, later reprising the role for the London and New York transfer, and on a world tour. She also appeared in The Trip, directed by Michael Winterbottom, playing opposite Steve Coogan and Rob Bryden. More recently, she played the leading role of Stella in the European film 18% Grey directed by Viktor Chouchkov.

Gavanski is a prolific voice actress, best known as Ania Zielinska in Company of Heroes 2 and Zarya in Overwatch and Heroes of the Storm. She has worked for BBC-produced radio plays and series as well, including the series Latvian Locum where she played the lead of Dr Zake over two sessions. Radio drama The Russian Gambler written by Gavanski aired on BBC Radio 4.

Her production company Thea Films is working on documentary and other films. Golos: Ukrainian Voices directed by Gavanski won Best Documentary Prize at London Independent Film Festival. Her latest film as a director, writer and producer is the feature documentary Women's Day, which includes stories by women born in the USSR – pioneers and survivors. The film premiered at the Moscow International Film Festival, won numerous awards and festivals and was distributed internationally in cinemas and on TV.

== Selected filmography ==
=== Actress ===
- 18% Grey – Stella
- Doctors – Several roles
- Our Kind of Traitor – Olga
- The Lesson – Tanja
- In the Land of Blood and Honey – Maida
- The Trip – Magda
- Spooks – Katerina
- Emmerdale – Danusia Piotrowsky
- EastEnders – Sandy (2010)
- Leonardo (TV Mini-Series documentary) – Mona Lisa
- Natasha – Vesna

=== Director ===
Year	Film	Director	Writer	Producer	Awards / Notes
2015	Golos: Ukrainian Voices	Yes	Yes	Yes	
2019	Women's Day	Yes	Yes	Yes	
2020	18% Grey	No	Yes	Yes	
