= Perfect Day (2005 film) =

2005 British film

Perfect Day is a 2005 British television film, initially broadcast on Five in December 2005.

Centered on a group of university friends who reunite five years later for the wedding of Tom (Tom Goodman-Hill) and Amy (Claire Goose), it tells the story of old loves rekindled, marriages falling apart and the problems of career women finding love. It also starred Robert James-Collier, Aidan McArdle, Kate Ashfield, Rhashan Stone, Claire Keelan, Bruce Mackinnon and Chris Bisson.

The film was well received, both by viewers, drawing some of the channel's highest figures, and by critics. It was so successful that it spawned both a prequel, Perfect Day: The Millennium, which told the story of the characters getting together for a party on New Year's Eve 1999, and a sequel, Perfect Day: The Funeral, in which the characters reunite one year after the wedding following the death of one of the group.

In November 2006, when the prequel and sequel were broadcast the initial film was retitled Perfect Day: The Wedding, and the three programmes were broadcast in chronological order over three consecutive weeks.
