= The Guess List =

2014 British comedy game show

- Genre: Comedy
- Developed by: Liz Gaskell; Josephine Brassey; James Woolley; Michael Bavafa-Khiavi
- Directed by: Steve Smith
- Presented by: Rob Brydon
- Composer: Will Slater
- Country of origin: United Kingdom
- Original language: English
- No. of series: 1
- No. of episodes: 6

Production
- Executive producers: Rhys Jonn; Andy Culpin; Michael Mannes; Paul McGettigan
- Producer: Ben Anderson
- Production location: Pinewood Studios
- Running time: 40 minutes
- Production companies: 12 Yard; Small Man

Original release
- Network: BBC One; BBC One HD
- Release: 12 April – 24 May 2014

The Guess List is a British comedy game show that was broadcast on BBC One from 12 April to 24 May 2014. Presented by Rob Brydon, it features two contestants competing for a prize specially selected for them.

== Production ==
The pilot episode was filmed on 23 August 2013 at MediaCityUK. The series was commissioned by Charlotte Moore, Mark Linsey and Alan Tyler and produced by 12 Yard.

== Episode list ==
No.	Title	Original release date	Overnight UK viewers (millions)
1	"Episode 1"	12 April 2014	3.10
Panellists: James Corden, Jennifer Saunders, Simon Callow, Emilia Fox and Louis Smith
2	"Episode 2"	19 April 2014	3.58
Panellists: Larry Lamb, Deborah Meaden, Julian Clary, Melanie C and David Haye
3	"Episode 3"	26 April 2014	3.5
Panellists: Harry Judd, Jason Manford, Carol Vorderman, Aled Jones and Kate Humble
4	"Episode 4"	3 May 2014	3.3
Panellists: Tess Daly, David Walliams, Ronnie Corbett, Kate Silverton and Kian Egan
5	"Episode 5"	17 May 2014	2.7
Panellists: Eamonn Holmes, Kate Garraway, Nick Hewer, Helen Skelton and Bob Mortimer
6	"Episode 6"	24 May 2014	2.4
Panellists: Rachel Riley, Russell Grant, Warwick Davis, Jane Horrocks and Gary Lineker
