= Claire Keelan =

English actress

- Born: 8 May 1975 (age 50); Liverpool, England
- Occupation: Actress
- Years active: 2004–present
- Spouse: Simon Farnaby
- Children: 1

Claire Keelan (born 8 May 1975) is an English actress, mostly in comedy. Her credits include A Cock and Bull Story (2005), Nathan Barley (2005), Perfect Day (2005), Survivors (2008), No Heroics (2009), Hush (2009), The Trip (2010), Mister John (2013), Agatha Christie's Poirot (2013), Black Mirror (2013), Carnage (2017), and Cold Feet (2020).

== Background ==
Keelan is a former member of the Royal Court Young People's Theatre, and trained at Westminster College between 1998 and 1999.

== Career ==
Keelan has appeared in the films A Cock and Bull Story (2005), Pierrepoint (2005) and Hush (2009). Her television credits include Perfect Day, Survivors,Sorted, Moving On, The Trip, and the pilot episode of How Not to Live Your Life. She played the lead roles of Claire Ashcroft in Nathan Barley, and Electroclash in No Heroics. In 2013 she appeared in an episode of Channel 4's Black Mirror written by Charlie Brooker.

Keelan's theatre work includes Top Girls, Ultra Violet, Les liaisons dangereuses, A Midsummer Night's Dream, Rise and Shine, and The Electric Hills.

== Personal life ==
Keelan is married to actor Simon Farnaby and they have a daughter together (b. 2014).

== Filmography ==
=== Film ===
Year	Film	Role	Notes
2005	A Cock and Bull Story	Make-up Assistant	
2005	Pierrepoint	Jessie Kelly	
2007	Hard to Swallow	Saskia	Short film
2008	Hush	Wendy	
2010	The Trip	Emma	
2012	Kelly + Victor	Victoria	
2013	Mister John	Kathleen Devine	
2013	Alan Partridge: Alpha Papa	Woman in car (voice)	Uncredited role
2014	The Trip to Italy	Emma	
2015	The Girl in the Dress	Mary	Short film
2017	Carnage	Lindsay Graber	Mockumentary film
2017	The Trip to Spain	Emma	
2017	Paddington 2	Police Officer	
2020	The Trip to Greece	Emma	
2026	The Magic Faraway Tree	Farmer's wife	

=== Television ===
Year	Show	Role	Notes
2004	All About Me	Sarah	Situation comedy - Episode: "Downloading"
2005	Nathan Barley	Claire Ashcroft	Situation comedy - 7 episodes
2005	Perfect Day	Kate	Television film
2006	The Bill	Sian Frost	Police procedural - Episode: "Lack of Restraint"
2006	Sorted	Polly	BBC Drama series - Episode: 1.6
2006	Perfect Day: The Millennium	Kate	Television films
2006	Perfect Day: The Funeral	Kate	Television films
2007	How Not to Live Your Life		Situation comedy - Episode: Pilot
2008	Survivors	Linda	Post-apocalyptic drama - Episode: 1.5
2008	No Heroics	Electroclash / Sarah	Comedy series - 6 episodes
2009	Moving On	Sonia	Anthology series - Episode: "Bully"
2010	Holby City	Rose Marsden	Drama series - Episode: "Shifts"
2010–2020	The Trip	Emma	Situation comedy - 14 episodes
2011	Outcasts	Carla Shapiro	Drama series - Episode: 1.7
2012	Line of Duty	DS Leah Janson	Crime drama - 5 episodes
2012	The Last Weekend	Em, Ian's girlfriend	Mini-series - 3 episodes
2013	Agatha Christie's Poirot	Nurse Craven	Episode: "Curtain: Poirot's Last Case"
2013	Black Mirror	Naomi	Episode: "Be Right Back"
2013	The Psychopath Next Door	Catriona McCann	Television film
2019	Call the Midwife	Gilda Brittall	Episode: 8.6
2020	Cold Feet	Sandra	Comedy drama - 4 episodes
2023	The Family Pile	Ursula	Comedy series - 6 episodes
2024	Daddy Issues	Jess	Comedy series - Episode: "Garden Sliders"
