= Rob Brydon =

Welsh actor and comedian (born 1965)

Rob Brydon MBE
- Brydon in 2026
- Born: Robert Brydon Jones; 3 May 1965 (age 61); Baglan, Glamorgan, Wales
- Education: Royal Welsh College of Music and Drama
- Occupations: Actor; comedian; impressionist; presenter; singer; writer
- Years active: 1985–present
- Known for: Full list
- Spouses: Martina Fitchie (m. 1992; div. 2000) Clare Holland (m. 2006)
- Children: 5
- Rob Brydon's voice from the BBC programme Front Row, 18 March 2012
- Website: robbrydon.com

Robert Brydon Jones (/ˈbraɪdən/; born 3 May 1965) is a Welsh actor, comedian, impressionist, presenter, singer and writer. He gained prominence for his roles in film, television and radio. He was appointed Member of the Order of the British Empire (MBE) in Elizabeth II's Birthday Honours in 2013 for services to comedy and broadcasting, and for charitable services.

Brydon gained fame for his roles in the black comedy series Human Remains (2000), the mockumentary series Marion and Geoff (2000–2003), the chat show spoof The Keith Barret Show (2004–2005), and the comedy series Supernova (2005–2006). From 2007 to 2024, he played Bryn West in the BBC sitcom Gavin & Stacey for which he received a BAFTA Award nomination for Best Comedy Performance.

Brydon has acted in a number of films with Steve Coogan for director Michael Winterbottom, starting with 24 Hour Party People (2002) and A Cock and Bull Story (2005). Brydon and Coogan then starred in The Trip (2010) followed by The Trip to Italy (2014), The Trip to Spain (2017), and The Trip to Greece (2020). He has also acted in the films Cinderella (2015), The Huntsman: Winter's War (2016), Holmes & Watson (2019) and Barbie (2023).

Since 2009, Brydon has presented the BBC One comedy panel show Would I Lie to You? after previously playing himself as host of a fictional panel show in Rob Brydon's Annually Retentive, which ran on BBC Three from 2006 until 2007. In addition to presenting his own late-night chat show, The Rob Brydon Show for two years, he hosted the 2014 Saturday-night game show The Guess List for BBC One.

== Early life and education ==
Robert Brydon Jones was born on 3 May 1965 in Baglan, Port Talbot, Glamorgan. His mother, Joy Jones (née Brydon), was a school teacher, and his father, Howard Jones, was a car salesman. He grew up in Baglan, with his younger brother Peter (born 1973).

Brydon was educated at two private schools: St. John's School in Porthcawl, which Eddie Izzard also attended, and Dumbarton House School in Swansea until the age of 14. This was followed by Porthcawl Comprehensive School, where he met Ruth Jones (with whom he later worked in Gavin & Stacey) and became a member of the school's youth theatre group. While at Dumbarton, he once stole the lunch money of fellow pupil Catherine Zeta-Jones, which he admitted while participating in a series 4 episode of Would I Lie To You?.

Brydon has said that his primary childhood influences in comedy were Barry Humphries, Frankie Howerd and Woody Allen. He has said that he used to memorise entire sketches by Peter Cook, Dudley Moore and Peter Sellers.

== Career ==
=== 1982–1999: Early radio work ===
Brydon attended the Royal Welsh College of Music & Drama, Cardiff. He left after a year, to join Radio Wales at the age of 20. His early broadcasts included work as a disc jockey on BBC Radio Wales, when his Saturday morning shows included contributions from stand-up comedian Pete Park-Walker. Between 1992 and 1994, on Radio Wales (where he stayed for six years) he was the main presenter of Rave, one of BBC Radio 5's youth magazine and music programmes, with Alan Thompson. He developed his Marion and Geoff story from this.

In 1994 and 1995, Brydon appeared in numerous episodes of the original Radio Wales version of the cult comedy Satellite City with Boyd Clack. Although he has stayed with radio as a comedy performer on BBC Radio 5 Live's The Treatment, Brydon also does occasional stints as a stand-in presenter on BBC Radio 2 including for Ken Bruce before Bruce resigned from the BBC in 2023. Notably on 1 April 2011, Brydon appeared during Bruce's absence, as him, as an April Fools' Day joke, for the entire show.

During an episode of Would I Lie To You?, Brydon admitted that he had pretended on the phone to be his own agent, using one of his repertoire of different voices in the early part of his career. This was done to justify enhancing his freelance work fees.

For a brief period, in the early 1990s, Brydon was a presenter for the Home Shopping Network. He began to find small roles in several successful films and television series. Brydon was first known nationally as a voice artist. He provided several voices for the Discworld computer games, voicing the main character, Lewton, in the Discworld Noir, and also for radio and television programmes such as Eurotrash. He is also known for voice-over work in television advertising, including for Renault, Tango, The Times, Tesco, Abbey National, Sainsbury's, McDonald's, Pot Noodle, Domino's Pizza, Crunchy Nut Cornflakes, The Observer and Fairy Liquid. He has also provided voices in animated films such as The Gruffalo, The Gruffalo's Child and Room on the Broom and continuity announcements for BBC 1.

=== 2000–2009: Television roles and acclaim ===
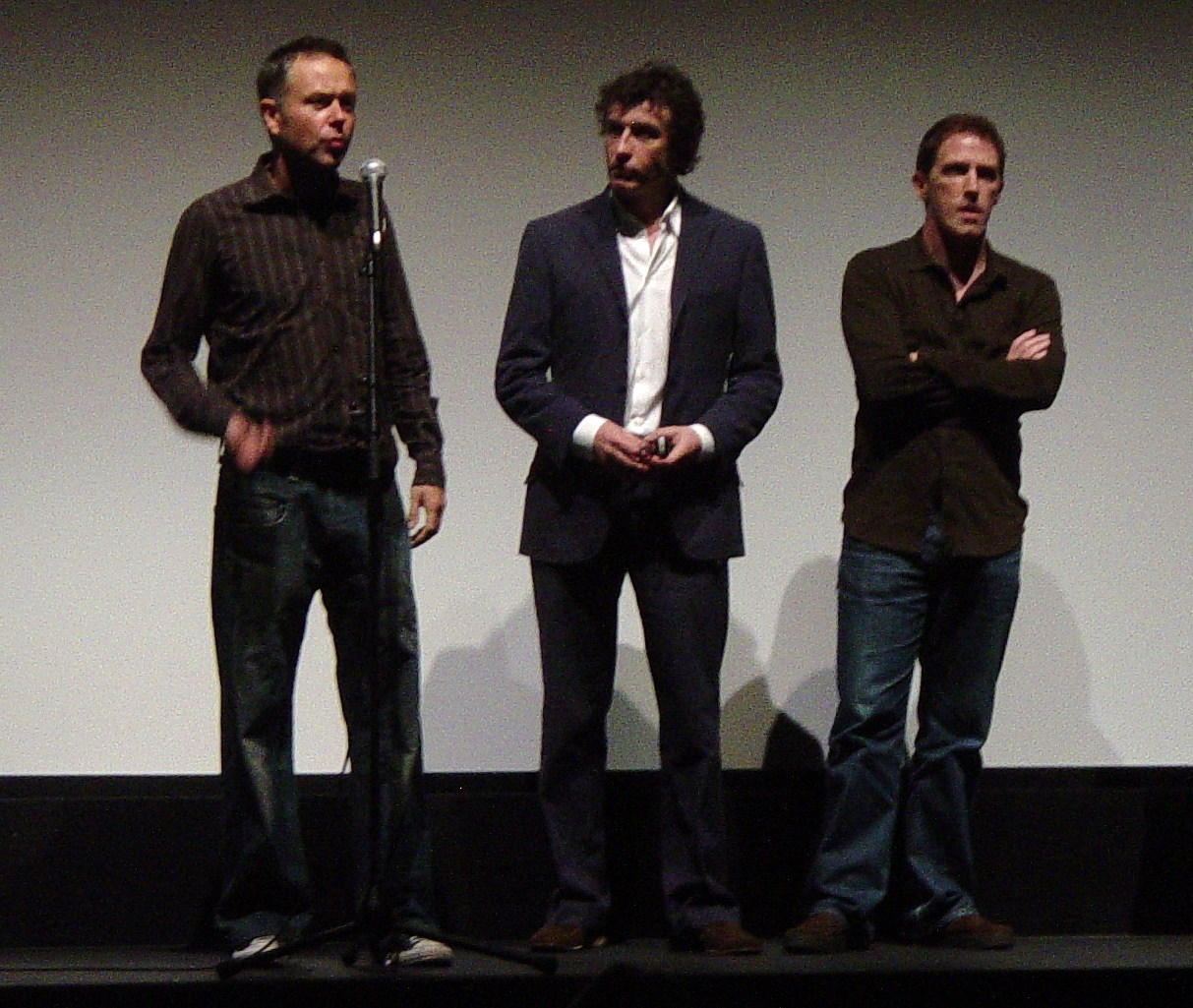
Michael Winterbottom (left), Steve Coogan (middle), and Brydon (right) at the Ryerson Theatre in Toronto, Canada, 2005

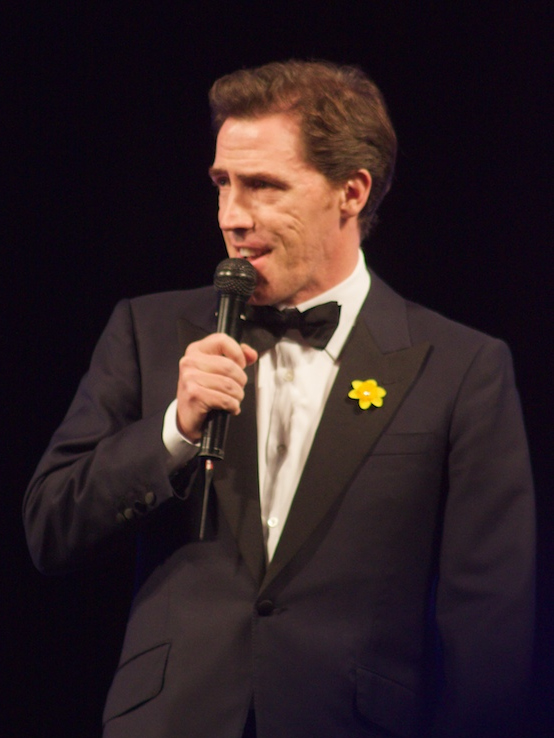
Brydon in 2009

In 2000 he made his mark in television comedy, with two series which he co-wrote and performed for the BBC: Human Remains, co-written by Julia Davis. From 2000 to 2003 he starred in the BBC television mockumentary Marion and Geoff which was commercially successful. Brydon plays as Keith Barret, a naïve taxi driver going through a messy divorce from his wife, Marion, who, though he fails to realise it, has had a long-standing affair with her colleague, Geoff. Each episode is presented as a monologue, filmed by a fixed camera in the confines of his car.

From 2004 to 2005 Brydon starred in The Keith Barret Show which was a fictional spoof of a BBC chat show. In 2006 he parodied comedy panel shows such as QI, Mock the Week and Have I Got News For You in the BBC Three series Rob Brydon's Annually Retentive. Ed Potton of The Times found that the series "provides the perfect platform for host Brydon, playing a demonic version of himself, to mimic (often hilariously) and abuse (often brutally) his guests".

In 2005 he portrayed a version of himself in the British comedy A Cock and Bull Story directed by Michael Winterbottom. Brydon starred opposite Steve Coogan. Dana Stevens of Slate wrote, "Rob Brydon, plays Tristram’s Uncle Toby, a blustering war veteran with a wound in an unspeakable place. In the modern-day scenes, Rob Brydon is, surprise, Rob Brydon, an actor with an ego even more pitifully in need of stroking than Coogan’s. The unscripted-sounding exchanges between these two are the funniest part of the movie".

From 2007 to 2010 Brydon gained prominence for his leading role as Uncle Bryn in the BBC sitcom Gavin & Stacey starring Matthew Horne, Joanna Page, and James Corden. In the 2009 Brydon was nominated for the BAFTA Award for Best Comedy Performance as Bryn. Starting in 2009 Brydon has hosted the game show Would I Lie to You?. Since these series Brydon has developed a career path as a character actor, in both comedic and serious roles. He portrayed controversial theatre critic Kenneth Tynan in the BBC Four film Kenneth Tynan: In Praise of Hardcore (2005), opposite Julian Sands as Laurence Olivier.

Also in 2006, Brydon first appeared on the BBC Radio 4 comedy panel game I'm Sorry I Haven't a Clue. His singing voice earned the unprecedented accolade from the former host, Humphrey Lyttelton, of being "not bad". When the team went on a tour of non-broadcast stage shows, Brydon filled in as chairman when Lyttelton was in hospital to repair an aortic aneurysm. Lyttelton died in hospital after surgery. Brydon narrated a two-part programme on BBC Radio 4, The Pain of Laughter: The Last Days of Kenneth Williams. It explored the latter part of Williams's life, featuring many of the performer's friends and contemporaries. In other radio work Brydon sat in for Ken Bruce on BBC Radio 2 for one day only on 25 August 2008. On 1 April 2011, Brydon impersonated Bruce for the entire two-hour and thirty minutes show. Bruce came on the air at the end of the show to reveal the prank. Brydon has appeared on the TV comedy quiz QI. In his first appearance (Series A, episode 5), his talent for mimicry was displayed with impressions of Alec Guinness, James Dean, and Michael J. Fox. In the 2008 Christmas special, he provided impressions of Richard Burton and Tom Jones.

His character Bryn West in Gavin & Stacey, written by Ruth Jones and James Corden, allowed him to return to his South Wales roots. In this role Brydon performed the 2009 Comic Relief charity single, "(Barry) Islands in the Stream", with Ruth Jones (both actors appearing as their characters from Gavin & Stacey) and singer Tom Jones. It reached No.1 in the UK Singles Chart on 15 March 2009. In February 2009, it was announced that Brydon would be one of three people to replace Lyttelton as chairman of the 51st series of I'm Sorry I Haven't a Clue (the others being Stephen Fry and Jack Dee). Brydon also appeared as guest panellist in the first two episodes of series 52, chaired by Jack Dee. He returned as a guest panellist in the last two episodes of series 54 in January 2011. Additionally, in 2009 he took over as host of Would I Lie To You?, replacing Angus Deayton. Brydon had also appeared as a guest panellist on the show during the previous season. Brydon has presented an episode of Have I Got News for You and has appeared on BBC Radio 4's panel game Just a Minute.

=== 2010–present: The Trip and other roles ===
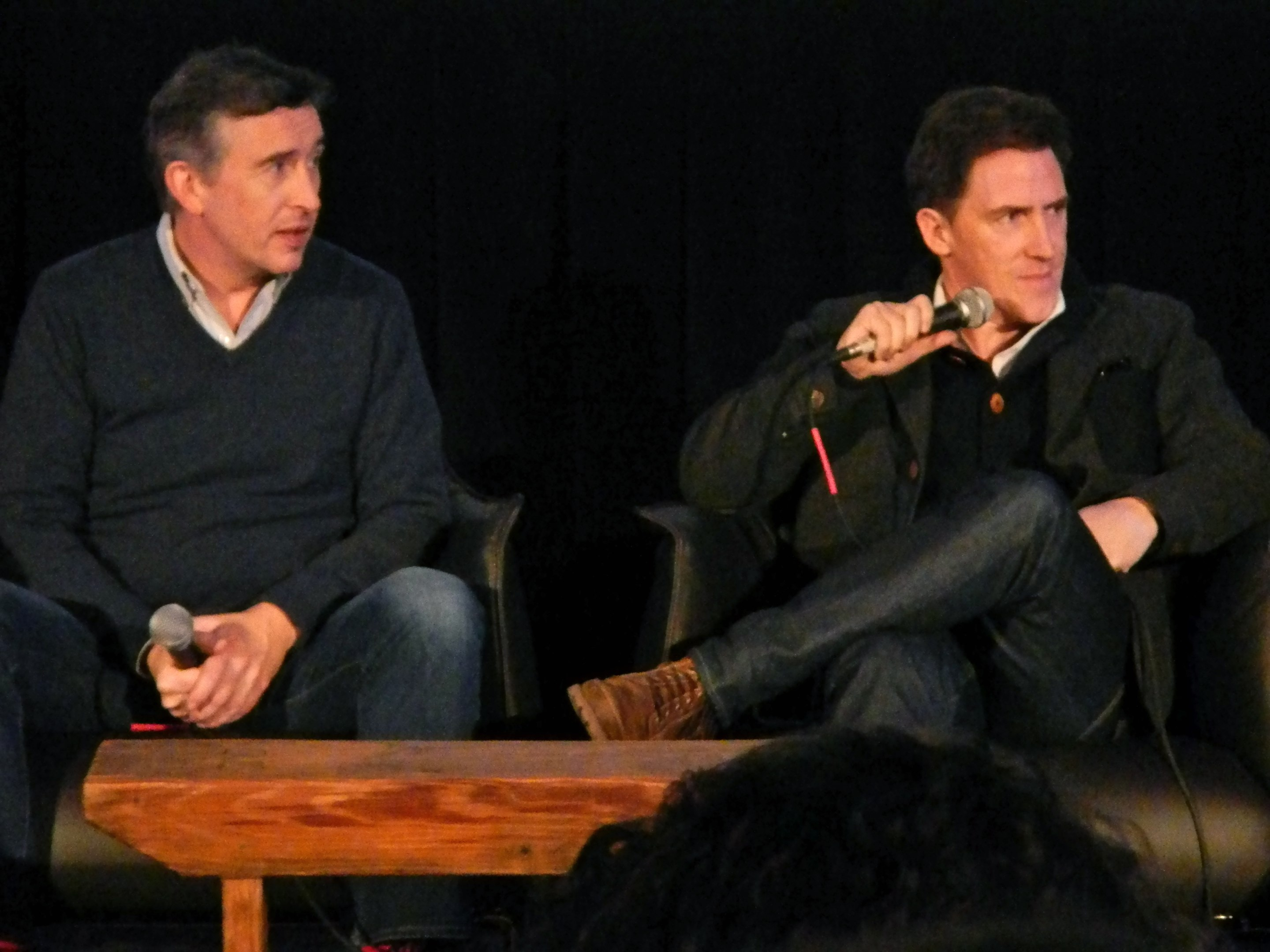
Steve Coogan and Brydon at the Sundance Film Festival promoting The Trip to Spain (2014)

Between September and October 2011, Brydon starred alongside Kenneth Branagh in Francis Veber's play The Painkiller at the Lyric Theatre in Belfast. He reprised his role with Branagh, in March and April 2016, at the Garrick Theatre in London's West End. Whilst not calling himself an impressionist, Brydon says he "started out as an impressionist" but will "bristle" when described as such. His impressions include Alec Guinness, James Dean, Michael J. Fox, Richard Burton, Tom Jones, Michael Caine, Mick Jagger and Ronnie Corbett. He is also noted for his "Small Man in A Box" impression.

In 2010 Brydon starred alongside Steve Coogan in Michael Winterbottom's partially improvised BBC Two sitcom series The Trip, in which both actors played fictionalised versions of their public personas (Brydon, optimistic and always eager to do an impression; and Coogan, misanthropic and bitter that he's not the major international star he believes he should be). Coogan and Brydon reprised their roles as themselves in the follow up films The Trip to Italy (2014), The Trip to Spain (2017), and The Trip to Greece (2020). The films have been met with critical acclaim with many critics describing them as "hilarious and heartbreaking". Elizabeth Nelson of The Ringer comparing their chemistry to that of Bob Hope and Bing Crosby in the Road movies. Nelson also compared the films to Tom Stoppard's Rosencrantz and Guildenstern Are Dead.

Brydon's book Small Man in a Book (the title a play on his "small-man-in-a-box" impression) was published in November 2011. In 2009/10 Brydon had his first stand-up tour in the UK as Rob Brydon, rather than as a differently named character. The resulting DVD of the 2009/10 show, Rob Brydon: Live, was released in November 2009. Brydon appeared as a host on episode two of series five of the BBC series of Live at the Apollo. In 2010 Brydon took part in Channel 4's Comedy Gala, a benefit show in aid of Great Ormond Street Children's Hospital, filmed live at the O2 Arena in London on 30 March. He was one of six compères for the Queen's Diamond Jubilee Concert held outside Buckingham Palace on 4 June 2012. The following year he dubbed the voice of Beto in the animated film The Unbeatables for the United Kingdom edition of the film.

In 2015, he had an uncredited role as Master Phineus in the Kenneth Branagh directed romantic fantasy Cinderella for Walt Disney Pictures. The following year he played Gryff in The Huntsman: Winter's War (2016) alongside Charlize Theron, Chris Hemsworth and Emily Blunt. That same year he played various roles in the BBC One animated series Revolting Rhymes (2016) which was nominated for the Academy Award for Best Animated Short Film.

In 2018, he played Inspector Lestrade in the mystery-parody Holmes & Watson starring Will Ferrell and John C. Reilly. Brydon also had roles in the stop-motion animated film Early Man (2018) and the British comedy Swimming with Men (2018). He also portrayed Richard Nixon in the FX series Trust (2018). The following year he had roles in the musical comedy Blinded by the Light (2019) and in the coming-of-age film Days of the Bagnold Summer (2019).

In 2021, he acted in the first episode of the second series of the show McDonald & Dodds. That same year he narrated The Chasers Road Trip: Trains, Brains and Automobiles, was a contestant on Celebrity Catchphrase, and voiced The Crow in Superworm alongside Olivia Colman and Matt Smith. The following year he voiced the Pied Piper in The Amazing Maurice (2022) alongside Hugh Laurie, Emilia Clarke, David Thewlis and Hugh Bonneville. In 2023 he had a brief role as Sugar Daddy Ken in Greta Gerwig's comedy Barbie starring Margot Robbie and Ryan Gosling.

In 2022, Brydon appeared in Stephen Sondheim's Old Friends revue, including alongside Haydn Gwynne in "The Little Things You Do Together", the marital battle from Company. In 2026, Brydon hosted game show The Floor on ITV. In June 2026, he was announced to portray King Herod in the West End revival of the musical Jesus Christ Superstar in November 2026.

== Personal life ==
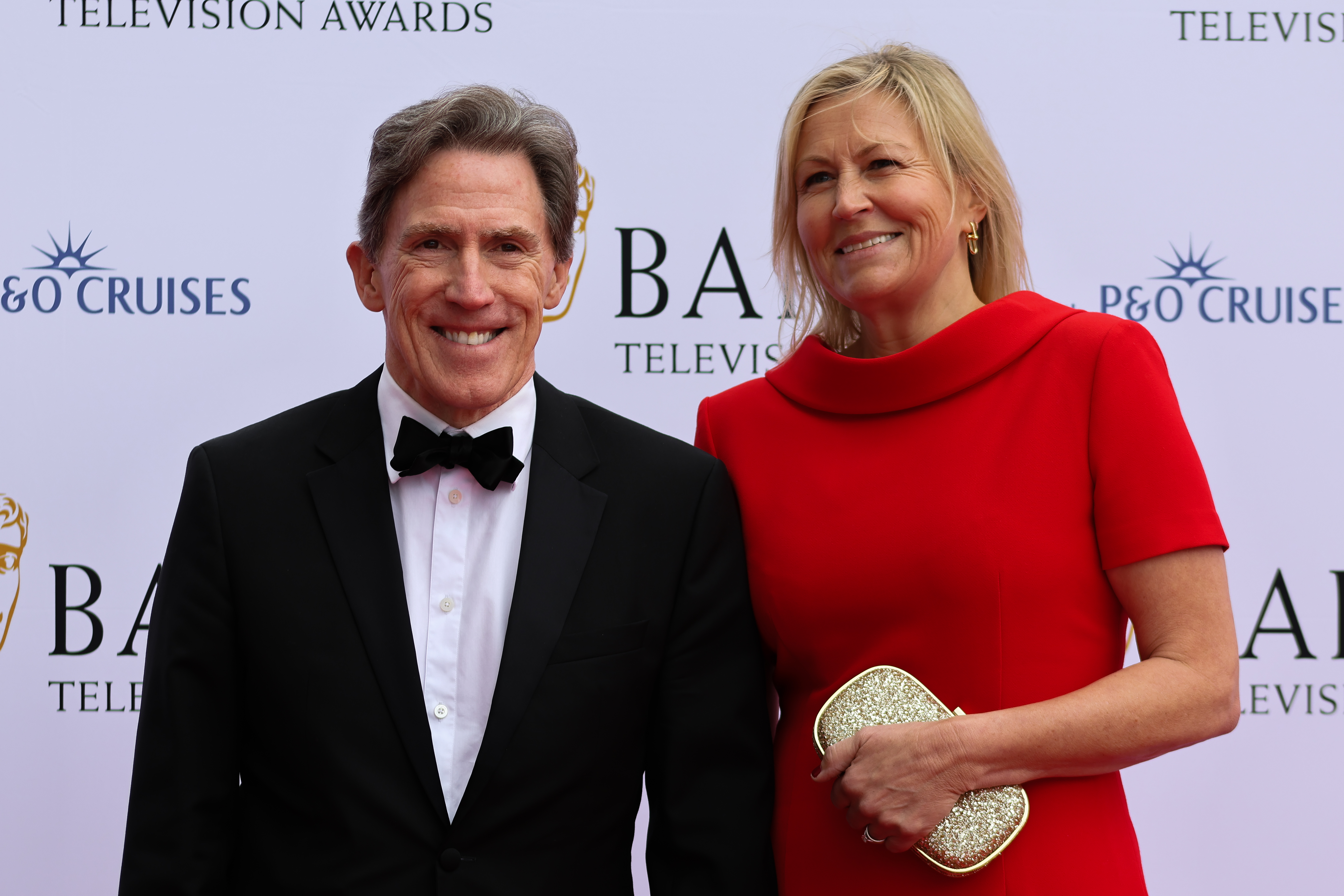
Brydon and Holland in 2026

Brydon was married to Martina Fitchie from 1992 to 2000. They had two daughters and a son.

On 6 October 2006, Brydon married Clare Holland, a former producer on The South Bank Show, at the church of St John the Baptist in Windsor, Berkshire. They live in Strawberry Hill in the London Borough of Richmond upon Thames. They have two sons.

A Swansea City football fan, Brydon is an ambassador to the club's 1912 foundation. He is also a supporter of Harlequins rugby union club. In May 2013 he competed for Wales, alongside Craig Bellamy, in a Celebrity Golf tournament at the Celtic Manor Resort in Newport.

In August 2014, Brydon was one of 200 public figures who were signatories to a letter to The Guardian opposing Scottish independence in the run-up to the 2014 Scottish independence referendum.

== Filmography ==
Key
†	Denotes works that have not yet been released

=== Film ===
Year	Title	Role	Notes	Ref(s)
1995	First Knight	Man in crowd		
1998	Martha, Meet Frank, Daniel and Laurence	Bus driver		
1998	Lock, Stock and Two Smoking Barrels	Traffic warden		
2002	24 Hour Party People	Ryan Letts		
2004	The Life and Death of Peter Sellers	Dustin Hoffman	Scene deleted	
2004	Shaun of the Dead	Football commentator/'Zombies from Hell!' presenter (voice)	Uncredited	
2005	MirrorMask	Morris Campbell/Prime Minister		
2005	A Cock and Bull Story	Capt. Toby Shandy/himself		
2010	The Trip	Himself		
2013	The Unbeatables	Rico (voice)	UK version	
2014	The Trip to Italy	Himself		
2015	Cinderella	Master Phineus	Uncredited	
2016	The Huntsman: Winter's War	Gryff		
2017	The Trip to Spain	Himself		
2018	Early Man	Message Bird, Brian and Bryan (voices)		
2018	Swimming with Men	Eric Scott		
2018	Holmes & Watson	Inspector Lestrade		
2019	Blinded by the Light	Matt's Father		
2019	Days of the Bagnold Summer	Douglas Porter		
2020	The Trip to Greece	Himself		
2022	The Amazing Maurice	The Pied Piper (voice)		
2022	Stephen Sondheim's Old Friends	Himself	Concert film	
2023	Barbie	Sugar Daddy Ken		
2025	Stitch Head	Professor (voice)		
2026	Clayface	Vic Chissler/Chat show host		
2026	Frank and Percy †		Post-production	
2026	The Trip to the Northern Lights †	Himself		
2027	Not Alone †	Dunk (voice)	In production	

=== Television ===
Year	Title	Role	Notes
1989	The Satellite Shop	Himself (Presenter)	BSkyB Infomercial
1994	The Healer	Sean	Television film
1995	Eleven Men Against Eleven	Radio commentator	Television film
1995	The Legends of Treasure Island	Long John Silver (voice)	Series 2
1996	Cold Lazarus	Karl	Channel 4/BBC One
1996	Lord of Misrule	Cornish policeman	Television film
2000	The Baskervilles	Brian Baskerville, Nicolas Lucifer II, others (voices)	ITV
2000	Human Remains	Peter Moorcross, Gordon Budge, Stephen, Tony, Barne Willers, Les	BBC Two
2000–2003	Marion and Geoff	Keith Barret	BBC Two
2001	The Way We Live Now	Mr Alf	BBC One
2001	A Small Summer Party	Keith Barret	Television film
2002	Murder in Mind	Barry Coates	BBC One
2002	Black Books	B Nugent	Channel 4
2002	Robbie the Reindeer: Legend of the Lost Tribe	Prison Guard (voice)	Television film
2002	I'm Alan Partridge	Baptist fan	Episode: "Alan Wide Shut"
2002	Cruise of the Gods	Andy van Allen	Television film
2003; 2008; 2018	Top Gear	Himself	BBC One
2003–2013	QI	Himself	BBC Four/BBC One/BBC Two
2004	Directors Commentary	Peter de Lane	ITV
2004	Agatha Christie's Marple	Inspector Awdry	Episode: "What Mrs McGillicuddy Saw!"
2004–2005	The Keith Barret Show	Keith Barret	BBC Two
2004–2015	The Big Fat Quiz of the Year	Himself – panellist	Channel 4
2005	Kenneth Tynan: In Praise of Hardcore	Kenneth Tynan	Television film
2005	Little Britain	Roman de Vere	Series 3
2005	Jack Dee Live at the Apollo	Keith Barret	BBC One
2005–2006	Supernova	Dr Paul Hamilton	BBC Two
2006	Have I Got News for You	Guest Presenter	BBC One
2006	100 Greatest Funny Moments	Narrator	Channel 4
2006–2007	Annually Retentive	Himself	BBC Three
2007	Dawn French's Boys Who Do Comedy	Himself	BBC One
2007	Heroes and Villains: Napoleon	Stanislas Fréron	BBC One
2007	Oliver Twist	Mr Fang	BBC One
2007–2010, 2019, 2024	Gavin & Stacey	Bryn West	BBC Three/BBC One
2009	Live at the Apollo	Compere/stand-up	BBC One
2009	Horne & Corden	Narrator to Olympic sketches	BBC Three
2009	The Gruffalo	Snake (voice)	Television film
2009–present	Would I Lie to You?	Presenter	Since Series 3
2010	Ronnie Corbett's Supper Club	Himself (guest)	Good Food
2010–2012	The Rob Brydon Show	Himself (host)	BBC Two
2010–2020	The Trip	Himself	BBC Two/Sky Atlantic
2011	A Quiet Word With ...	Himself (guest)	ABC
2011	Michael McIntyre's Christmas Comedy Roadshow	Father Christmas/himself	BBC One
2011	The Gruffalo's Child	Snake (voice)	Television film
2012	The Best of Men	Corporal Wynne Bowen	Television film
2012	Room on the Broom	Cat (voice)	Television film
2013	Gangsta Granny	Mr. Parker	Television film
2014	This is Jinsy	Rex Camalbeeter	Series 2
2014	The Guess List	Himself	BBC One
2015	The Brink	Martin	HBO
2015	Stick Man	Various (voice)	Television film
2015	Ant & Dec's Saturday Night Takeaway	Star Guest Announcer	Series 12, episode 3
2016	Revolting Rhymes	King, Rolf, the Banker Pig, the Short Sister (voice)	BBC One
2017	Not Going Out	George (voice)	Series 8, episode 3
2017	The Highway Rat	Narrator and Horse (voices)	Television film
2017	The Nightly Show	Himself (guest)	ITV
2018	Trust	Richard Nixon	FX
2019	The Snail and the Whale	Whale (voice)	BBC One
2020	Ant & Dec's Saturday Night Takeaway	Star Guest Announcer	Series 16, episode 2
2020	Roald & Beatrix: The Tail of the Curious Mouse	William Heelis	Television film
2020	Zog and the Flying Doctors	The King (voice)	Television film
2021	The Chasers Road Trip: Trains, Brains and Automobiles	Narrator	3 episodes
2021	McDonald & Dodds	Roy Gilbert	Episode: "The Man Who Wasn't There"
2021	Celebrity Catchphrase	Himself (contestant)	Episode: "2021 Christmas Special"
2021	Superworm	The Crow (voice)	Television film
2022	Green Eggs and Ham	Philip Trousers (voice)	Netflix
2022	The Smeds and The Smoos	Uncle Smoo (voice)	Television film
2022	The Tuckers	Tony Perrot	BBC One Wales
2023	Tabby McTat	Fred (voice)	BBC One
2024	My Lady Jane	Lord Dudley	Amazon Prime
2024	Tiddler	Voices of Fisherman, Whale, Starfish and Anchovy	BBC One
2025	Destination X	Himself (host)	BBC One
2025	Rob Brydon’s Honky Tonk Road Trip	Himself (host)	BBC Two
2025	The Scarecrows’ Wedding	Reginald Rake (voice)	BBC One
2026	The Floor	Himself (host)	ITV
2026	Bill's Included	Bill Beam	BBC One
2026	The Baddies †	Ghost (voice)	BBC One

=== Radio ===
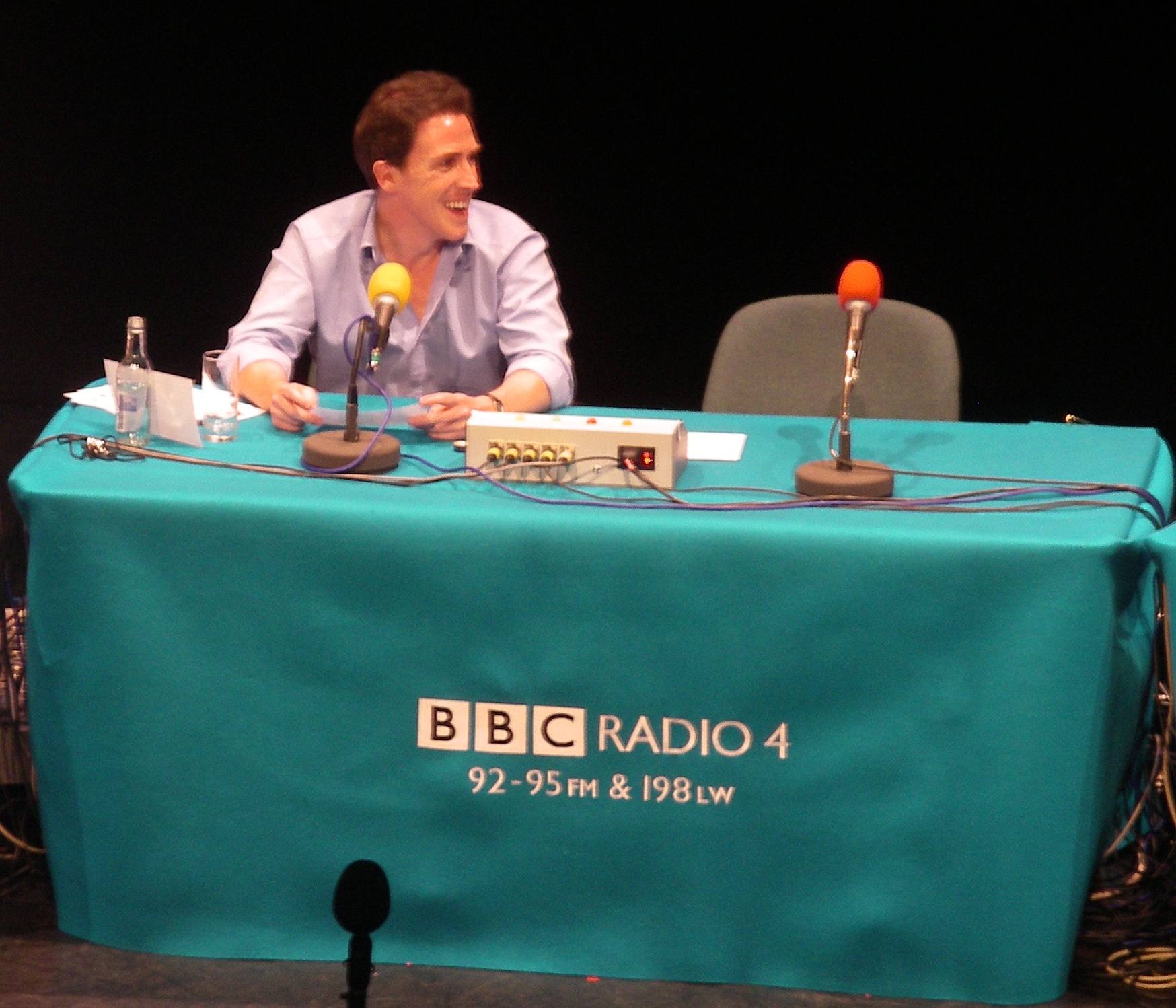
Brydon on I'm Sorry I Haven't a Clue in 2009

Year	Title	Role
1992–1994	Rave	Himself – presenter
1994	Satellite City	Himself – radio show
1995	The Treatment	Himself – radio show
2004	Just a Minute	Himself
2005	Just a Minute	Himself
2005	Flight of the Conchords (radio series)	Narrator
2006–2021	I'm Sorry I Haven't a Clue	Himself (host in 1 episode)
2009	The Unbelievable Truth	Himself
2011	The Ken Bruce Show	Ken Bruce (as an April Fool joke)
2012	Best of Men	Himself

Other appearances

- Rob Brydon's Identity Crisis (March 2008)
- The One Show (December 2009)
- Desert Island Discs (May 2010), his favourite track was "Born to Run" by Bruce Springsteen
- TV advertising campaign for P&O Cruises (2014–)
- Script editor for a season 2 of Little Britain

== Honours and awards ==
Brydon was made an honorary fellow of the Royal Welsh College of Music & Drama where he previously studied. Brydon was appointed Member of the Order of the British Empire (MBE) in the 2013 Birthday Honours for services to comedy and broadcasting, and for charitable services.

Year	Association	Category	Nominated work	Result	Ref.
2000	British Comedy Awards	Best Comedy Newcomer	Marion & Geoff	Won	
2001	British Comedy Awards	Best TV Comedy Actor	Human Remains	Won	
2003	British Comedy Awards	Best TV Comedy Actor	Marion & Geoff / Cruise of the Gods	Nominated	
2004	BAFTA Award	Best Situation Comedy	Marion & Geoff	Nominated	
2005	British Independent Film Award	Best Supporting Actor	Tristham Shandy: A Cock and Bull Story	Nominated	
2009	BAFTA Award	Best Comedy Performance	Gavin & Stacey	Nominated	
2009	British Comedy Award	Best TV Comedy Actor	Gavin & Stacey	Nominated	
2010	British Comedy Award	Best TV Comedy Actor	The Trip	Nominated	
2010	British Comedy Award	Best New TV Comedy	The Trip	Nominated	
2011	BAFTA Award	Best Situation Comedy	The Trip	Nominated	
2011	BAFTA Award	Best Entertainment Performance	The Rob Brydon Show	Nominated	
2011	British Comedy Award	Best Male TV Comic	Would I Lie to You	Nominated	
2018	BAFTA Award	Best Male Performance in a Comedy Series	The Trip to Spain	Nominated	

== Discography ==
Singles

Year	Single	Chart positions		
Year	Single	UK	IRE	EU
2009	"(Barry) Islands in the Stream"	1	48	7
