= No Heroics =

British television series

- Genre: Sitcom; Superhero
- Created by: Drew Pearce
- Starring: Patrick Baladi; Nicholas Burns; Claire Keelan; James Lance; Rebekah Staton
- Country of origin: United Kingdom
- Original language: English
- No. of series: 1
- No. of episodes: 6

Production
- Running time: 30 minutes
- Production company: Tiger Aspect Productions

Original release
- Network: ITV2
- Release: 18 September – 23 October 2008

No Heroics is a British superhero comedy television series that premiered on 18 September 2008. The show was ITV2's first original sitcom. It was nominated for Best New British TV Comedy of 2008 at the British Comedy Awards.

== Setting ==
No Heroics is set in modern-day Britain, in a world similar to ours but "With one small difference: there are superheroes." The superheroes of the world (colloquially referred to as "capes") are primarily modelled after those of the Golden Age of Comic Books, usually clad in brightly coloured outfits consisting of skin-tight materials such as Lycra or spandex. The presence of superheroes in the world is commonplace, arriving not only to save people or avert disaster but also carrying out everyday tasks such as grocery shopping or taking a smoke break, all while in full costume. Other aspects of society relating to superheroes include:

- Sidekick taxes - all superheroes have to pay sidekick taxes even if they choose not to have a sidekick; these taxes are to compensate those affected when a sidekick makes a mistake such as blowing up a post office.
- The SPA - the Super Powers Authority deals with abuse of powers cases, dealing out punishments including community service, such as mentoring an unruly sidekick.
- Anti-cape leagues - parallel to neo-Nazi groups in the real world, anti-cape groups (such as the Cape Haters of Great Britain) are prejudiced against superheroes and tell "capeist" jokes, and sometimes go around "cape-bashing".
- The Fortress - the bar of choice for the protagonists, where most of the show takes place, with three fundamental rules: "No Masks, No Powers and No Heroics".
- A superhero academy exists where the capes are trained.
- Cape rape - a term similar to date rape, referring to superhero rapists.
- The Stronghold - the supervillain equivalent of The Fortress. A place for the villains to meet and show their battle and torture scars from their run-ins with heroes.

== Characters ==
=== Primary characters ===
- Alex, "The Hotness" – Nicholas Burns

Alex controls heat and is desperate to be famous for saving the world (or at least someone), but somehow Excelsor always manages to save the day before him. His main work comes in winter when he fills in for the heaters at old peoples' homes when they are broken.

- Sarah, "Electroclash" – Claire Keelan

Sarah can control machines with her voice. She would rather steal a pack of cigarettes from a machine than help the "normal" world with her power. Seen as the most rock 'n' roll of the bunch, Sarah is the daughter of famous superheroes "Rampart" and "Velvet Veil", described by Sarah as the "Torvill and Dean" or the "Richard and Judy" of the superhero world. She is Alex's on-off love interest, having broken up with him some time prior to the start of the series. Sarah was a member of the short lived superhero team known as "Lady Trouble", alongside Jenny (She-Force).

- Don, "Timebomb" – James Lance

Don can see sixty seconds into the future and is an expert in torture. The gay Spaniard only uses his abilities to his friends' advantage, due to his retirement only taking on a few jobs to keep the cash rolling. He is also an ex-drug addict and frequently engages in sex with strangers. Don appears to be the only cape with a more modern-style costume, wearing a black leather suit of body armour in stark contrast to the brightly coloured outfits of his peers.

- Jenny, "She-Force" – Rebekah Staton

Jenny has super-strength and is the third strongest female in the world, but doesn't feel comfortable being a superhero. She would much rather spend her days at her desk, waiting for Mr Right to come along. Socially awkward, Jenny revels in having a secret identity as an office worker, a charade her friends find pointless. Jenny was a member of the short lived superhero team known as "Lady Trouble", alongside Sarah (Electroclash).

- Devlin, "Excelsor" – Patrick Baladi

Devlin is the most successful cape in the United Kingdom; he is a "Rock Star" within the superhero world, with a high public profile and numerous commercial endorsement deals. Due to his immense success Devlin's attitude is highly egotistical and selfish, and he takes pleasure in reminding Alex and the other "lesser" superheroes of his superiority at every opportunity, often by bullying Alex. Devlin has a wide array of powers, which include but are not limited to: flight, laser eye beams, X-ray vision, super speed, force field creation and manipulation, super sensitive hearing, and mind control abilities.

=== Supporting characters ===
- Simon, "Thundermonkey" - Jim Howick

Simon worked in the Fortress as a bouncer, whose job it was to ensure that the regulars played by the rules. The regulars treat him as a bit of a joke, particularly Sarah. He is allowed to use his powers in the fortress as part of his job. His power involved summoning and commanding monkeys; the monkeys do not simply appear, they have to physically travel from wherever they happened to be. Given that they took so long to respond to his calls, they were never seen on screen (although their coffins were present at Simon's funeral), even after relocating their home reduced their response time from 2 and a half hours to 40 minutes. After Sarah taunted him about being a crap superhero he picked a fight with Slicefist (a known supervillain with razor blade fingers), both he and his monkeys were killed in the resulting fight.

- "Norse Dave" - Steve Spiers

The bartender for the Fortress who fought in the Falklands War, alongside Rampart and Excelsor. He suffers from PTSD and physical injuries from the Gulf conflict; his powers are as yet unknown. He is pictured in background art dressed as a stereotypical Viking, armed with an axe.

- "Doomball" - Oliver Maltman

This villain's main feature is a huge black ball-like helmet over his head with a small slit to see out of. He wishes to be taken more seriously as a villain; in this regard he could be considered an evil foil to Alex, though his actual powers are unknown. He was captured and tortured by Don in episode 6, revealing the location of the villains' stronghold to enable the heroes to avenge the death of Simon.

== Episodes ==
1. "Supergroupie" (18 September 2008)
2. "The Fantastic Chore" (25 September 2008)
3. "Mean Gills" (2 October 2008)
4. "Back Issues" (9 October 2008)
5. "Origin and Tonic" (16 October 2008)
6. "Monkey Gone to Heaven" (23 October 2008)

== In-jokes ==
The Fortress is a take on the Fortress of Solitude and other such superhero residences, but rather than being actually a hideout it is simply a bar.

The Fortress serves "Green Lamp Ale" on tap, "Shazamstell", "Von Doomenbrau", "Bottled Beast" (a blue vodka look alike), "Grey Widow Vodka", "Gin City", "Little Jock", "V for Vodka", "Gamma-Meister" and "Logan's Rum", a reference to both Logan's Run and Wolverine.

ATMs shown belong to "Stanlees Savings Bank".

The strip club visited by Don and Alex where the girls are wearing Wonder Woman costumes is called Paradise Island.

In the show's world, popular superheroes have comic books devoted to them, but the actual actions of all heroes are also reviewed by critics, exactly like comic books. Heroes are thus subject to criticism not only for incompetence, but also for being insufficiently entertaining.

== Influences ==
The series contains a lot of references to comics in the props, touching on both American comic books as well as British comics like 2000 AD – the latter being the home of Grant Morrison's Zenith, which was "the germ of it", according to the writer Drew Pearce. The actors Nicholas Burns and Claire Keelan had previously appeared together as main characters in Nathan Barley, with Burns as the title character.

== Reception ==
The show was well received by the broadsheet and mainstream press. Stephen Armstrong of The Times thinks that No Heroics is "possibly the first genuinely amusing sitcom on any ITV outlet since, well – any suggestions?" Also at The Times, Michael Moran expresses similar sentiments, suggesting that it "is edgier than My Hero though – closer perhaps to cult favourite Mystery Men" and that while "Episodes one and two might be a slow burn ... [b]y the third instalment though, the hapless heroes are established as a superior sitcom characters that deserve a spot in the pantheon of loveable loser comedy that stretches from Tony Hancock to David Brent."

Jane Simon in The Mirror thought that "the affectionate yet satirical tone is gauged just right to appeal to super-nerds and regular viewers, and is packed with tiny details to reward aficionados." "What's on TV" called the show "inspired" whilst The Times continued their support of the show by saying "ITV2's new comedy No Heroics is fast, funny and a little ingenious. Drew Pearce, the creator/writer, established an engaging collection of pretenders to the throne: The Hotness, a sexually inadequate "cape" with a penchant for heat; Electroclash, who let a shop owner get shot and suffer from his injuries because he was sexist; Timebomb is Spanish, depressed, unhinged; She Force is a superhero with the twittering insecurities of Carrie Bradshaw."

In addition, the influential British comic book creator Warren Ellis showed a warm display of support for the show saying that "it's funnier than a comedy show about superheroes has any right to be. It's a miracle it got on the air at all. Full points to creator/writer Drew Pearce for coming up with something that should translate to a general audience because it's black humour first and everything else second."

Comic book writer Steven Grant responded negatively to the show, saying "boy, does it suck. Nothing but mindless, pandering sex jokes (would-be jokes, anyway) and The Beano level schoolboy shenanigans." His sentiments were shared by Anna Lowman of TV Scoop, who thought that "[t]he main problem with this comedy is that the writers have apparently decided to replace the jokes with an unremitting coarseness ... and to produce characters that no-one in their right mind could give too (sic) hoots about" concluding that "No Heroics is just another reason why ITV is known as the graveyard of comedy." Robert Hanks of The Independent picked up on similar angles: "It is quite a nice idea, certainly a much better idea than My Hero ... but so far Drew Pearce's script is too ready to fall back on the drink and the sex every time it needs a laugh."

== American adaptation ==
ABC commissioned a pilot of No Heroics in the United States, with Pearce being joined by Will & Grace writer Jeff Greenstein. In March, it was announced that Freddie Prinze Jr. had been cast as Infinitum, the A-list superhero, and Paul Campbell, Eliza Coupe, Tom Riley and Arielle Kebbel are playing the B-listers. Some scenes were filmed in the Gastown District in Vancouver, BC April 2009.

Josh Gad played their former classmate from Superhero College, Horse Force, who can summon and command horses and works at a bar where the group hangs out.

ABC subsequently declined to pick up the American adaptation of No Heroics.

DIRECTV has exclusive rights to the British version of the series.
