= Asanda Jezile =

Asanda
- Born: Asanda Jezile; 17 September 2001 (age 24); Enfield, London, England
- Genres: Pop, R&B
- Occupation: Singer
- Instrument: Vocals
- Years active: 2013–present

Asanda Jezile (born 17 September 2001) is an English singer. Her parents moved to the UK from Eastern Cape, South Africa. She was a finalist at the seventh series of Britain's Got Talent, finishing in 11th place.

== 2013: Britain's Got Talent ==
Asanda auditioned to Britain's Got Talent with "Diamonds" by Rihanna. She received rave reviews regarding her stage presence. However, her performance was criticised for being "sexualised". Viewers complained about it for the same reason as Arisxandra's audition – that the lyrics, such as "I see a vision of ecstasy when you hold me", "I knew that we'd become one right away" and "as we moonshine and molly" (a reference to drinking illicit spirits and taking the powder or crystal form of MDMA) were not appropriate for someone her age, as well as her somewhat provocative dancing. Some also took to Twitter to claim that this proved Rihanna is not a good role model for children. However, Asanda's father Lennox insisted that his daughter is "mature for her age": stating, "I know she is young but, believe me, she's ready ... We know there will always be negative as well as positive comments. We don't want her to get hurt so we've prepared her. We will always give her our support." She was still put through to the live semi-finals.

She performed Beyoncé Knowles' "Halo" in the semi-final on 31 May, once again winning over both the audience and the judges. Simon Cowell told her that she has the "wow factor", while Alesha Dixon told her she was 'unbelievable'. She landed in the top 3, and the judges had to choose between her and Alex Keirl for the second place in the final from that semi-final with Francine Lewis already through. Holden opted for Keirl while the other three judges opted for Asanda sending her through to the final. However, voting statistics released after the show revealed that Alex Keirl actually had a higher percentage of votes with 21.4% compared to Asanda's 19.4%.

She performed "If I Were a Boy" in the final on 8 June. Dixon said "It takes artists years to get to that level of performance and presence, and your voice, by the time you get into a recording studio, you have one of the nicest tones to your voice and I can't wait to hear your album." Amanda Holden stated, "You have such attitude. You remind me of Will Smith's daughter." Simon Cowell said, "You have done three performances so far for us and this is so far the best by a mile. When I meet you backstage you're a sweet normal girl and when you walk on stage you turn into this different thing and I love that." David Walliams added, "It's not like watching an 11-year-old girl, its like watching a superstar."

She finished in last place with 1.2% of the vote. It is said that she has secured a record deal with the help of Cowell, according to a tweet from an account claiming to be Asanda's.

She has reportedly caught the eye of Disney bosses. It was also reported that she had auditioned a lead role in an upcoming Disney movie.

== 2018: Eurovision: You Decide ==
Asanda competed in the 2018 edition of Eurovision: You Decide for a chance to represent the United Kingdom at the Eurovision Song Contest 2018 in Lisbon, Portugal, but lost out to SuRie. Charlotte Runcie of The Daily Telegraph described her song "Legends" as "the most contemporary-sounding" out of the contestants, but noted that her live performance showed inexperience. Popjustice ranked her song "fifth worst" (second best) out of the six contenders, describing the song as "good enough to be the twelfth best song in Melodifestivalen".
