= The Trip (2010 TV series) =

British TV and film comedy

- Genre: Sitcom
- Directed by: Michael Winterbottom
- Starring: Steve Coogan; Rob Brydon
- Country of origin: United Kingdom
- Original language: English
- No. of series: 4
- No. of episodes: 24

Production
- Producers: Andrew Eaton; Melissa Parmenter
- Running time: 30 mins
- Production companies: Revolution Films; Baby Cow Productions; Arbie (2010); Small Man (2014-2020)

Original release
- Network: BBC Two (2010–2014); BBC HD (2010); BBC Two HD (2014); Sky Atlantic (2017); Sky One (2020; 2026)
- Release: 1 November 2010 – present

Related
- A Cock and Bull Story

The Trip is a British television sitcom and feature film directed by Michael Winterbottom, starring Steve Coogan and Rob Brydon as fictionalised versions of themselves on a restaurant tour of northern England. The series was edited into feature film format and premiered at the Toronto International Film Festival in September 2010. The full series was first broadcast on BBC Two and BBC HD in the United Kingdom in November 2010. Both the TV series and film received very positive reviews.

Three further series followed. The Trip to Italy was broadcast on BBC Two in 2014, The Trip to Spain was filmed in 2016 and broadcast on Sky Atlantic in 2017, and The Trip to Greece was filmed in 2019 and aired on Sky One in 2020. Like the first series, the second, third and fourth were each edited into feature films. At the time, Winterbottom, Coogan and Brydon stated that The Trip to Greece would be the final series for the show. However, a fifth series, The Trip to the Northern Lights, set in Scandinavia, was announced in June 2025, and is set to be released in December 2026.

== Origins ==
Coogan and Brydon's roles as fictionalised versions of themselves are a continuation of their improvised performances in the film A Cock and Bull Story (2005), also directed by Michael Winterbottom. In an interview with The Guardian, Coogan said he and Brydon exaggerated "the aspects of ourselves that help the comedy ... I like playing with the fact that it might be me, to give it a bit more edge. So some of the conversations with Rob are funny, but some of them are very uncomfortable. They're sort of genuine arguments. It's a sort of an exaggeration of real life."

== Cast and characters ==
- Steve Coogan as Steve Coogan
- Rob Brydon as Rob Brydon
- Claire Keelan as Emma, Steve's assistant who joins each of the trips for at least a few days
- Rebecca Johnson as Sally, Rob's wife
- Tim Leach as Joe, Steve's son, with whom he has a distant relationship that they gradually mend throughout the series
- Marta Barrio as Yolanda, a photographer who accompanies Emma, and has a casual relationship with Steve
- Margo Stilley as Mischa, Steve's American girlfriend who breaks up with him in the first series
- Ben Stiller appears in a cameo as himself in one of Steve’s dreams

== Plot ==
In an effort to save his relationship with his gourmet girlfriend, Mischa, actor Steve Coogan accepts a commission from The Observer to go on a restaurant tour of northern England. When Mischa insists they take a break from their relationship, Steve invites colleague and frenemy Rob Brydon. On the trip, Coogan has a number of one-night stands, but is miserable professionally and personally, despite being the bigger star; Brydon, with his young family, is more content and laid-back. The two argue and attempt to one-up and humiliate each other with their impersonations of celebrities including Michael Caine and Sean Connery.

In the second series, Rob and Steve are commissioned to do another restaurant tour, this time in Italy from Piedmont to Capri, following in the footsteps of the great Romantic poets in the early 19th century on the Grand Tour. While on the tour, Rob wins a part in an American Michael Mann film. Steve reconnects with his estranged son, Joe, who briefly joins the two towards the end of their trip.

In the third series, Rob and Steve are commissioned to do another restaurant tour, this time in Spain.

The fourth series is set in Greece where Rob and Steve conduct a restaurant tour that follows the path of the Odyssey.

== Episodes ==
=== Overview ===
Series	Episodes	Originally released		
Series	Episodes	First released	Last released	Network
1	6	1 November 2010	6 December 2010	BBC Two
2	6	4 April 2014	9 May 2014	BBC Two
3	6	6 April 2017	11 May 2017	Sky Atlantic
4	6	3 March 2020	31 March 2020	Sky One

=== Series 1: The Trip (2010) ===
No. overall	No. in series	Title	Directed by	Written by	Original release date	UK viewers (millions)
1	1	"The Inn at Whitewell"	Michael Winterbottom	Steve Coogan & Rob Brydon	1 November 2010	2.30
2	2	"L'Enclume"	Michael Winterbottom	Steve Coogan & Rob Brydon	8 November 2010	N/A
3	3	"Holbeck Ghyll"	Michael Winterbottom	Steve Coogan & Rob Brydon	15 November 2010	N/A
4	4	"Hipping Hall"	Michael Winterbottom	Steve Coogan & Rob Brydon	22 November 2010	N/A
5	5	"The Yorke Arms"	Michael Winterbottom	Steve Coogan & Rob Brydon	29 November 2010	N/A
6	6	"The Angel at Hetton"	Michael Winterbottom	Steve Coogan & Rob Brydon	6 December 2010	N/A

=== Series 2: The Trip to Italy (2014) ===
No. overall	No. in series	Episode	Directed by	Written by	Original release date	UK viewers (millions)
7	1	"Il Cenobio dei Dogi, Camogli"	Michael Winterbottom	Steve Coogan & Rob Brydon	4 April 2014	1.64
8	2	"Da Giovanni, San Fruttuoso"	Michael Winterbottom	Steve Coogan & Rob Brydon	11 April 2014	1.55
9	3	"La Suvera, Pievescola"	Michael Winterbottom	Steve Coogan & Rob Brydon	18 April 2014	1.43
10	4	"Hotel Locarno, Rome"	Michael Winterbottom	Steve Coogan & Rob Brydon	25 April 2014	1.47
11	5	"Villa Cimbrone, Ravello"	Michael Winterbottom	Steve Coogan & Rob Brydon	2 May 2014	1.32
12	6	"Il Riccio, Capri"	Michael Winterbottom	Steve Coogan & Rob Brydon	9 May 2014	1.35

=== Series 3: The Trip to Spain (2017) ===
No. overall	No. in series	Episode	Directed by	Written by	Original release date	UK viewers (millions)
13	1	"Txoko"	Michael Winterbottom	Steve Coogan & Rob Brydon	6 April 2017	N/A
14	2	"Etxebarri"	Michael Winterbottom	Steve Coogan & Rob Brydon	13 April 2017	N/A
15	3	"La Posada del Laurel"	Michael Winterbottom	Steve Coogan & Rob Brydon	20 April 2017	N/A
16	4	"Nöla"	Michael Winterbottom	Steve Coogan & Rob Brydon	27 April 2017	N/A
17	5	"Parador de Almagro"	Michael Winterbottom	Steve Coogan & Rob Brydon	4 May 2017	N/A
18	6	"El Refectorium"	Michael Winterbottom	Steve Coogan & Rob Brydon	11 May 2017	N/A

=== Series 4: The Trip to Greece (2020) ===
No. overall	No. in series	Episode	Directed by	Written by	Original release date	UK viewers (millions)
19	1	"Troy to Kavala"	Michael Winterbottom	Steve Coogan & Rob Brydon	3 March 2020	N/A
20	2	"Kavala to Pelion"	Michael Winterbottom	Steve Coogan & Rob Brydon	3 March 2020	N/A
21	3	"Pelion to Athens"	Michael Winterbottom	Steve Coogan & Rob Brydon	10 March 2020	N/A
22	4	"Athens to Hydra"	Michael Winterbottom	Steve Coogan & Rob Brydon	17 March 2020	N/A
23	5	"Hydra to the Mani"	Michael Winterbottom	Steve Coogan & Rob Brydon	24 March 2020	N/A
24	6	"The Mani to Ithaca"	Michael Winterbottom	Steve Coogan & Rob Brydon	31 March 2020	N/A

=== Other ===
The concept was revived for The Big Night In, a 20 April 2020 telethon held during the COVID-19 pandemic, in a skit which had the pair conducting a video call from their homes to discuss making a segment for the telethon.

== Reception ==
The Trip received positive reviews. Andrea Mullaney of The Scotsman said that "on paper, The Trip sounds bloody awful: a cosy, luvvie giant in-joke for Steve Coogan and Rob Brydon", but went on to describe it as "completely brilliant" and "hilarious". Brian Viner of The Independent said: "The Trip never fails to oblige. I love it for its originality and its daring." John Crace of The Guardian described the show as "one of the funniest things on TV." Director Richard Curtis described the series as one of the greatest television programmes of all time at the 2013 British Comedy Awards. It was nominated, in 2011, for the BAFTA Television Award for Best Situation Comedy, and Steve Coogan won the award for Best Male Comedy Performance. It won the Best New Programme award at the 2012 Broadcast Awards in London. In 2018, Rob Brydon was nominated for the BAFTA Television Award for Best Male Comedy Performance, but lost out to Toby Jones for Detectorists.

The second series, The Trip to Italy, also received positive reviews. Review aggregator Rotten Tomatoes reports that 87% of 54 film critics have given the film a positive review, with a rating average of 7.3 out of 10. Stephanie Zacharek of The Village Voice wrote that The Trip to Italy "is basically more of the same Trip ... Now we know just what to expect from Coogan and Brydon, although as long as you're willing to settle in for the ride, that's not necessarily a bad thing." Scott Foundas of Variety found the series a "warmly enjoyable continuation of their improvised cultural and culinary adventures." William Goss of Film.com wrote: "Plenty enjoyable for fans of the first one, but by the end, it also has the consistency of reheated comfort food." Amber Wilkinson of The Daily Telegraph gave the film version of The Trip to Italy a grade B score, writing that Coogan and Brydon's "improvisation has been honed to the point where the jokes land solidly without losing naturalism and the pair of them are clearly enjoying la dolce vita."

A review article of the series was published in the online quarterly film journal Senses of Cinema in 2015, which reflects upon its relationships to poetry, the work of Walter Benjamin, allegory, tragedy, mourning, Italian neorealism, Romanticism, and The Gravediggers scene from Shakespeare's Hamlet. In 2019, The Trip was ranked 95th on The Guardian's list of the 100 best TV shows of the 21st century.

== Broadcast ==
In Australia, the programme was first screened Wednesday nights at 10:00pm on ABC1 starting on 14 December 2011, nearly a year after the feature film edit of The Trip was released in the United Kingdom.

In the United States, it aired on BBC America.

== DVD releases ==
The first series of The Trip was released on 13 December 2010. The second series was released on 12 May 2014, as well as a boxset featuring all 12 TV episodes, and a boxset of the film versions.

== Future ==
In 2023, Coogan mentioned wanting to do a fifth series, perhaps in the two men's ancestral homes of Wales and Ireland. However, in 2024 Michael Winterbottom stated in an interview that there would be no more films in the series.

In February 2025, Coogan again had a driving ban reduced from six points and six months to five points and two months, saying that the longer disqualification would disrupt forthcoming filming and affect many people. In a letter to Birmingham Magistrates Court, Coogan cited a new instalment of The Trip as one such commitment, saying that filming was to start in June 2025. He had been caught speeding at 97 mph on a motorway in July 2024, and faced the prospect of a six-month ban as another six penalty points on his driving licence would have taken it to the twelve-point limit incurring the ban. In an interview with new Late Late Show host Patrick Kielty in February 2025, Coogan admitted that he and Brydon were about to make another instalment.

In June 2025, a fifth series was confirmed by Sky, set in Scandinavia, with the name The Trip to the Northern Lights.
