= A Cock and Bull Story =

2005 British comedy film by Michael Winterbottom

- Film poster
- Directed by: Michael Winterbottom
- Screenplay by: Martin Hardy
- Based on: The Life and Opinions of Tristram Shandy, Gentleman by Laurence Sterne
- Produced by: Andrew Eaton
- Starring: Steve Coogan; Rob Brydon; Keeley Hawes; Shirley Henderson; Dylan Moran; Jeremy Northam; Naomie Harris; Kelly Macdonald; James Fleet; Ian Hart; Gillian Anderson
- Cinematography: Marcel Zyskind
- Edited by: Peter Christelis
- Music by: Michael Nyman; Nino Rota
- Production companies: BBC Films; Baby Cow Productions; EM Media; East Midlands Media Initiative; Revolution Films; Scion Films
- Distributed by: Redbus Film Distribution
- Release dates: 17 July 2005 (Cambridge Film Festival); 20 January 2006 (United Kingdom)
- Running time: 94 minutes
- Country: United Kingdom
- Language: English
- Budget: $4.7 million
- Box office: $3.9 million

A Cock and Bull Story (marketed in Australia, New Zealand and the United States as Tristram Shandy: A Cock and Bull Story, and also credited as such) is a 2005 British comedy film directed by Michael Winterbottom. It is a film-within-a-film, featuring Steve Coogan and Rob Brydon playing themselves as egotistical actors during the making of a screen adaptation of Laurence Sterne's 18th-century metafictional novel Tristram Shandy. Gillian Anderson and Keeley Hawes also play themselves in addition to their Tristram Shandy roles. Since the book is about a man attempting but failing to write his autobiography, the film takes the form of being about failing to make the film.

== Plot ==
The film depicts Steve Coogan playing himself as an arrogant actor with low self-esteem and a complicated love life. Coogan is playing the eponymous role in an adaptation of The Life and Opinions of Tristram Shandy, Gentleman being filmed at a stately home. He constantly spars with actor Rob Brydon, who is playing Uncle Toby and who believes that his role is of equal importance to Coogan's, calling himself the "co-lead".

The film incorporates several sequences from Tristram Shandy. Not all of these are part of the film-within-the-film. The latter are limited to the story of Tristram's conception, birth and christening; Uncle Toby's experiences at the Battle of Namur and Tristram's sudden and accidental circumcision at the age of three. Uncle Toby's wooing of Widow Wadman (Gillian Anderson) takes place in a sequence dreamed by Steve Coogan and after the cast and crew have viewed the "completed" film ending, with Walter Shandy fainting at the sight of his wife giving birth, the question "How does the book end?" is followed by the concluding scene of the novel, in which Yorick says "It is a story about a Cock and a Bull – and the best of its kind that ever I heard!" Yorick is not in the film-within-the-film; in this scene he is played by Stephen Fry, who appears elsewhere in the film as Patrick, a caricatured version of the actual curator at Shandy Hall. The DVD extras include a scene of Fry talking with the curator he portrays.

== Cast ==
- Steve Coogan as Tristram Shandy / Walter Shandy / Steve Coogan
- Rob Brydon as Captain Toby Shandy / Rob Brydon
- Raymond Waring as Corporal Trim / Raymond Waring
- Keeley Hawes as Elizabeth Shandy / Keeley Hawes
- Shirley Henderson as Susannah / Shirley Henderson
- Gillian Anderson as Widow Wadman / Gillian Anderson
- Dylan Moran as Dr Slop / Dylan Moran
- David Walliams as Curate
- Stephen Fry as Parson Yorick / Patrick Curator / Stephen Fry
- Jeremy Northam as Mark (director)
- Benedict Wong as Ed
- Ian Hart as Joe (writer)
- James Fleet as Simon (producer)
- Naomie Harris as Jennie
- Kelly Macdonald as Jenny
- Mark Williams as Ingoldsby
- Greg Wise as Greg
- Roger Allam as Adrian
- Ashley Jensen as Lindsey
- Ronni Ancona as Anita
- Kieran O'Brien as Gary
- Anthony H. Wilson as TV interviewer
- Oscar Watkin as Baby

== Soundtrack ==
The film's soundtrack is notable for featuring numerous excerpts from Nino Rota's score for the Federico Fellini film 8½, itself a self-reflexive work about the making of a film. Other non-diegetic musical references are made to Amarcord, The Draughtsman's Contract, Smiles of a Summer Night, Fanny and Alexander and Barry Lyndon. Michael Nyman, composer of The Draughtsman's Contract, provides a new arrangement of the Handel Sarabande featured in the latter film, while the tracks of The Draughtsman's Contract (the original soundtrack recordings, the score has been re-recorded numerous times) serve as a temp track to film of the Sterne material.

== Locations ==
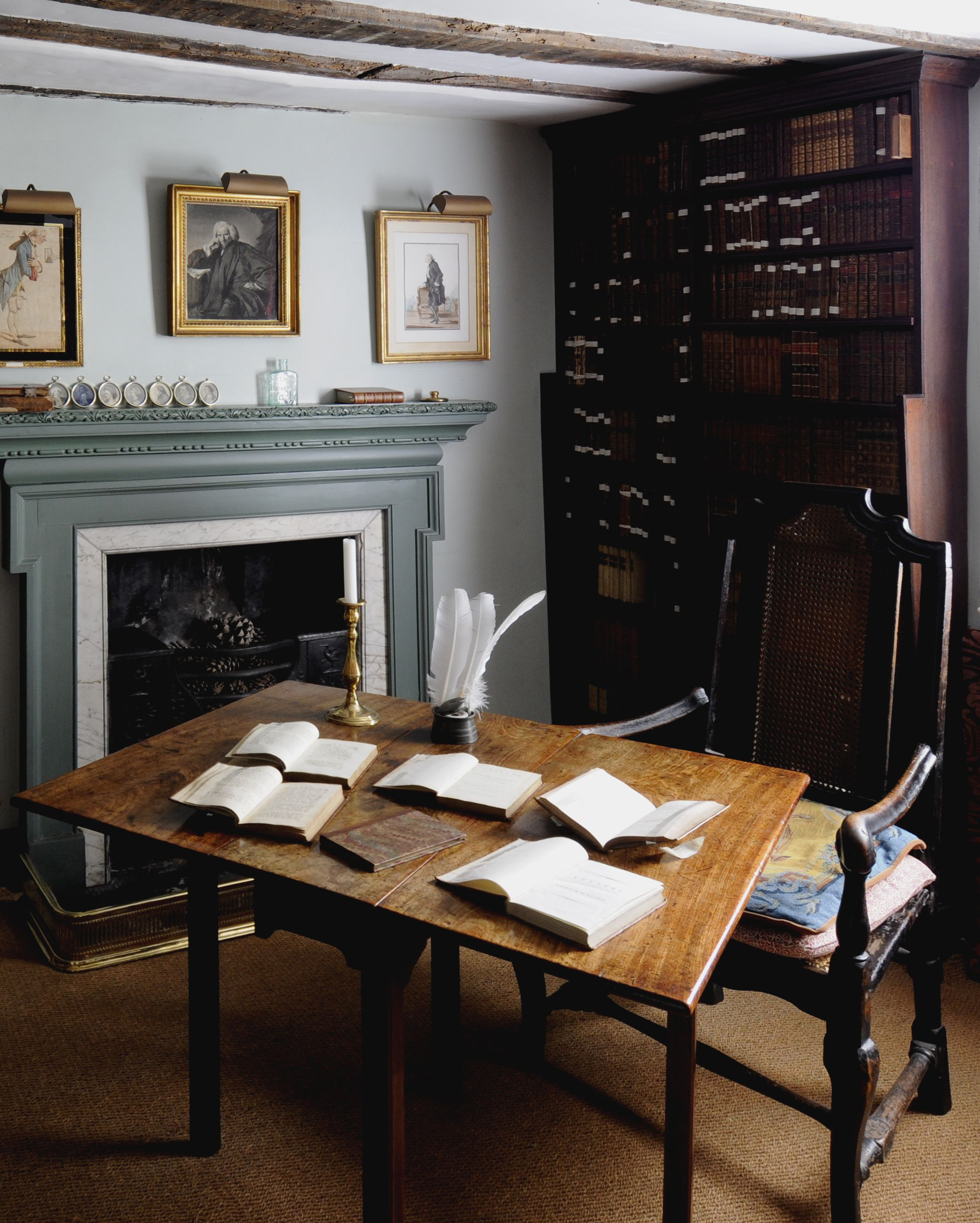
Laurence Sterne's study at Shandy Hall, in which Stephen Fry appears as a caricatured version of "Patrick", the actual curator of the museum

The film was recorded at a number of locations in England:

- Blickling Hall, Norfolk
- Felbrigg Hall, Norfolk
- Gunthorpe Hall, Norfolk
- Heydon Hall, Norfolk
- Deene Park, Northamptonshire
- Kirby Hall, Northamptonshire
- Lamport Hall, Northamptonshire
- Shandy Hall, North Yorkshire - Which was Laurence Sterne's home where part of Tristram Shandy was written.
- Quenby Hall, Leicestershire
- Great Fosters, Egham, Surrey

== Reception ==
A Cock and Bull Story has received very positive reviews. As of January 2024, the film holds an 88% approval rating on review aggregator Rotten Tomatoes, based on 129 reviews with an average rating of 7.50/10. The website's critical consensus reads, "Steve Coogan and Rob Brydon add madcap, knowing performances to the mix, and the result is a fun, postmodern romp." On Metacritic, the film has a weighted average score of 80 out of 100, based on 35 critics, indicating "generally favorable reviews".

== Home media ==
A Cock and Bull Story was released on both Region 1 and Region 2 DVD in July 2006.

== The Trip ==
The fictionalised versions of Steve Coogan and Rob Brydon seen in the film reappear as the central characters in Michael Winterbottom's 2010 BBC series The Trip and its sequels.
