= The Trip to Italy =

2014 British film

- Film poster
- Directed by: Michael Winterbottom
- Written by: Michael Winterbottom
- Produced by: Melissa Parmenter; Josh Hyams
- Starring: Steve Coogan; Rob Brydon; Rosie Fellner; Claire Keelan; Marta Barrio; Timothy Leach; Ronni Ancona; Rebecca Johnson
- Cinematography: James Clarke
- Edited by: Mags Arnold; Robbie Gibbon; Paul Monaghan; Marc Richardson
- Production companies: BBC Films; Revolution Films; Baby Cow Productions; Small Man
- Distributed by: Picturehouse Entertainment
- Release dates: 20 January 2014 (Sundance Film Festival); 15 August 2014 (United States)
- Running time: 115 minutes
- Country: United Kingdom
- Language: English
- Box office: $6 million

The Trip to Italy is a 2014 British comedy film written and directed by Michael Winterbottom. It is the sequel of Winterbottom's TV series The Trip, and also stars Steve Coogan and Rob Brydon as fictionalized versions of themselves. The film had its world premiere at the 2014 Sundance Film Festival on 20 January 2014. Following the premiere, a second TV series, also titled The Trip to Italy, was broadcast on BBC Two. The movie is the edited version of the TV show.

== Premise ==
Rob Brydon has been commissioned by a newspaper to go on a road trip through Italy from Piedmont to Capri, partly following in the footsteps of the Romantic poets. Steve Coogan joins him, and as they journey through the Italian countryside, they contemplate life, love, and their careers.

== Cast ==
- Steve Coogan as Steve Coogan
- Rob Brydon as Rob Brydon
- Claire Keelan as Emma
- Rosie Fellner as Lucy
- Marta Barrio as Yolanda
- Timothy Leach as Joe
- Ronni Ancona as Donna

== Reception ==
Review aggregator Rotten Tomatoes reports that 87% of 134 film critics have given the film a positive review, with a rating average of 7.30/10. The site's critical consensus reads, "While perhaps not quite as fresh as Coogan and Brydon's original voyage in The Trip, The Trip to Italy still proves a thoroughly agreeable sequel." Metacritic, which uses a weighted average, assigned the film a score of 75 out of 100, based on 36 critics, indicating "generally favorable" reviews.

Scott Foundas of Variety, said in his review that "Coogan, Brydon and Winterbottom journey to the Mediterranean in this warmly enjoyable continuation of their improvised cultural and culinary adventures." William Goss of Film.com gave the film a generally positive review, saying that it is "plenty enjoyable for fans of the first one and these two", while noting that "by the end, it also has the consistency of reheated comfort food." Amber Wilkinson of The Daily Telegraph gave the film a B, saying that "Their improvisation has been honed to the point where the jokes land solidly without losing naturalism and the pair of them are clearly enjoying la dolce vita".
