= Noel Edmonds =

English television presenter and executive (born 1948)

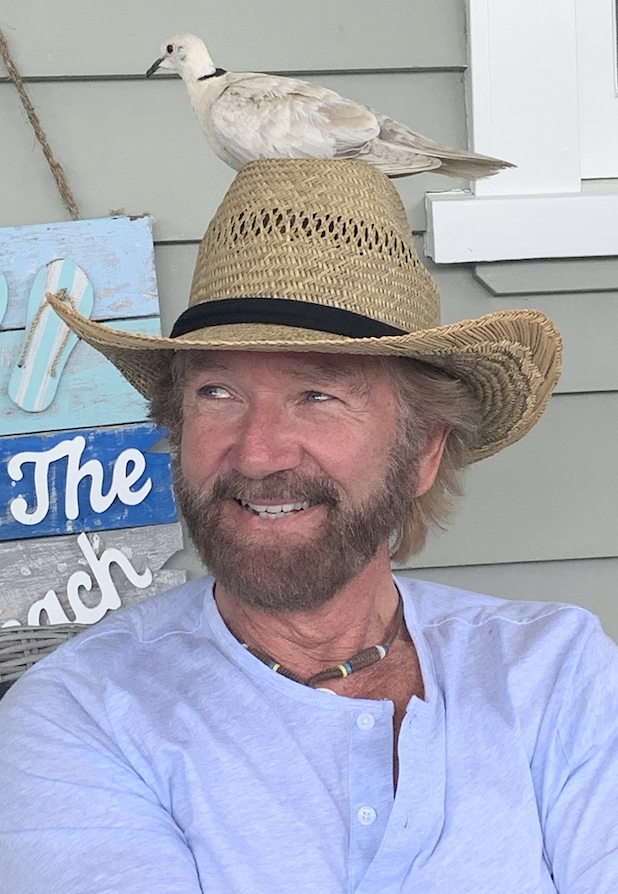
- Edmonds in 2020
- Born: Noel Ernest Edmonds; 22 December 1948 (age 77); Ilford, Essex, England
- Occupations: Television presenter; radio DJ; writer; producer; businessman
- Years active: 1968–present
- Spouses: Gillian Slater (m. 1971; div. 1982); Helen Soby (m. 1986; div. 2005); Liz Davies (m. 2009)
- Children: 4

Noel Ernest Edmonds (born 22 December 1948) is an English businessman, and former television presenter, radio DJ, writer and producer. Edmonds first became known as a disc jockey on Radio Luxembourg before moving to BBC Radio 1 in the UK, presenting its breakfast show for almost five years. He presented various radio shows and light-entertainment television programmes, originally working for the BBC and later Sky and Channel 4.

After presenting children's Saturday-morning programme Multi-Coloured Swap Shop (1976–1982) and various other BBC TV shows like Top of the Pops and Top Gear during the 1970s, he became best known for presenting Noel's House Party on BBC One from 1991 to 1999. The show achieved 15 million viewers at its peak and originated the character Mr Blobby. He also presented the BBC TV shows Noel's Christmas Presents (1989–1999) and Telly Addicts (1985–1998). Following a hiatus from broadcasting, Edmonds presented the game show Deal or No Deal on Channel 4 from 2005 to 2016.

== Early life ==
Edmonds was born in Ilford, Essex, the son of Dudley Edmonds, a headmaster who worked in Hainault, Chigwell, and Lydia Edmonds, an art teacher. He attended Glade Primary School in Clayhall and Brentwood School in Brentwood, Essex.

He was offered a place at the University of Surrey but turned it down to focus on his radio career.

== Radio career ==
Edmonds began working as a newsreader on Radio Luxembourg, which was offered to him in 1968 after he sent tapes to offshore radio stations.

In 1969, Edmonds moved to BBC Radio 1, where he began by recording trailers for broadcasts and filling in for absent DJs, such as Kenny Everett. In April 1970, he began his own two-hour Saturday-afternoon programme, broadcasting from 1 to 3 p.m., before replacing Everett on Saturdays from 10 a.m. to noon in July that year. In October 1971, he was moved to a Sunday slot from 10 a.m. to noon before being promoted to host The Radio 1 Breakfast Show from Monday 4 June 1973 to Friday 28 April 1978, taking over from Tony Blackburn. Edmonds then moved back to Sunday mornings, from 10 a.m. to 1 p.m., in 1978 and also presented Talkabout, an hour-long talk show broadcast on Thursday evenings. Edmonds left Radio 1 in March 1983.

Edmonds made two temporary returns to Radio 1. First in 1985, when he sat in for Mike Read hosting the breakfast show for 1 week, and again in 1992 for a one-off show to celebrate Radio 1's 25th birthday.

In 2003, Edmonds made a brief radio comeback, taking over the drivetime broadcast on BBC Radio 2 for eight weeks while Johnnie Walker was treated for cancer. His stint on Radio 2 lasted from 4 August until 3 October. In December 2004, Edmonds played a detective on a radio murder mystery play on local station BBC Radio Devon.

In 2020, Edmonds set up an online radio network in New Zealand, called Positivity Radio.

== Television career ==
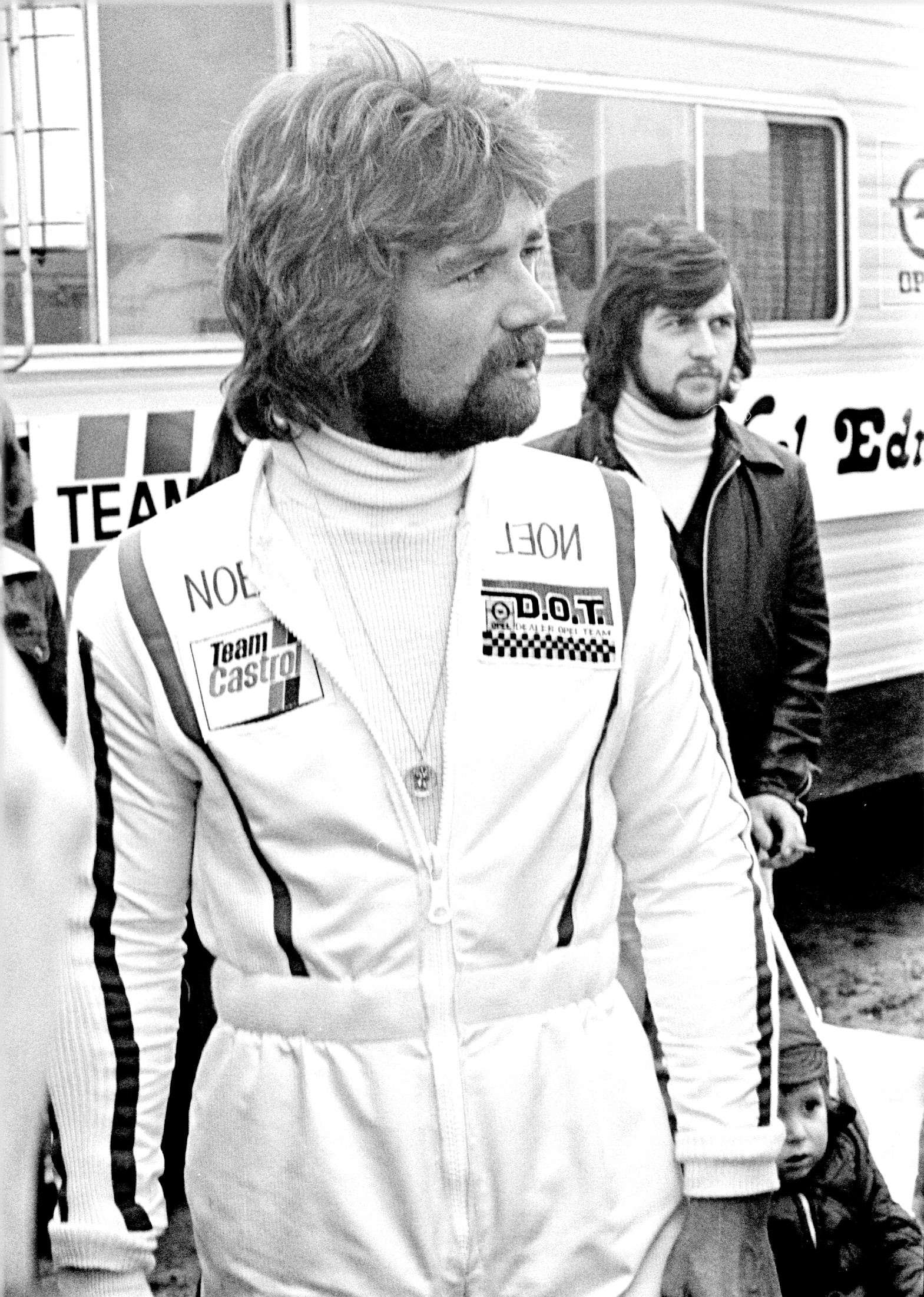
Edmonds at a Radio 1 Raceday, Mallory Park, May 1976

Edmonds hosted Top of the Pops at various points between 1972 and 1978, during which time he also presented a phone-in programme for teenagers called Z Shed on BBC1 as well as a programme called Hobby Horse. He hosted the children's Saturday-morning programme Multi-Coloured Swap Shop, which ran from 1976 to 1982. With fellow Swap Shop regulars Maggie Philbin and Keith Chegwin, Edmonds was a member of the trio Brown Sauce, which recorded the single "I Wanna Be a Winner" in 1981. It reached number 15 in the UK singles chart. In 1980, Edmonds took part in the Eurovision Song Contest, introducing the UK entry live on stage at the final in the Hague. During Swap Shop's run Edmonds hosted Lucky Numbers, a Saturday evening phone-in quiz programme which required viewers to call in and answer questions based on clips of films shown, and a revival of the 1960s pop music series Juke Box Jury.

Edmonds was one of the original presenters of the BBC's motoring series Top Gear during the late 1970s. During his time on the programme he mocked the Fiat Strada, saying it "wasn't very good", which caused Fiat to threaten to sue the BBC unless he apologised for the comments. Edmonds reappeared in one episode of Top Gear in the 1990s, to road test the classic 1960s Ford GT40 supercar, of which he owned two, because the host Jeremy Clarkson – at 6 ft 5 in (1.96 m) tall – was unable to fit into the cockpit. In 1997 Clarkson was one of Edmonds' star team for the 1997 Le Mans race which was featured in Noel's Le Mans Dream, a two-part documentary for BBC 2. In the 1980s Edmonds hosted a series on BBC1 called The Time of Your Life, in which celebrities recalled the time they were at their happiest professionally. It ran for three series from 1983.

=== The Late Late Breakfast Show ===
The Late Late Breakfast Show was Edmonds' first Saturday-evening light-entertainment show on the BBC. Presented by Edmonds live on Saturday evenings from 4 September 1982 to 8 November 1986, initially with co-host Leni Harper. It also featured Mike Smith and John Peel.

The programme is remembered for several stunts going wrong during its regular "Give it a Whirl" viewer-participation slot; in particular, the death of Michael Lush in rehearsals. While practising a bungee jump to be performed live on the show, Lush fell 120 feet (37 m) to his death when the clip holding his rope failed. Edmonds resigned from the BBC immediately afterwards, and the show was cancelled two days later on 15 November 1986.

=== Telly Addicts ===
Telly Addicts was a BBC1 game show hosted by Edmonds, who also owned the format. Telly Addicts broadcast for 13 years from 3 September 1985 until 29 July 1998. Questions were based on past and present television programmes, and generally took the form of a short clip being shown followed by a series of questions either specifically about the clip or more generally about the programme from which it had been taken. Two teams sat opposite each other on sofas.

In 1991 he presented a prime time series called Noel's Addicts, but this show had no similarity to the Telly Addicts format and only ran for one series.

=== Saturday Roadshow ===
Noel's Saturday Roadshow was Edmonds's second BBC television light entertainment show, broadcast on Saturday evenings from 3 September 1988 to 15 December 1990. Presented by Edmonds, it was his first major TV project since the demise of The Late, Late Breakfast Show two years earlier. The programme contained several elements found in its predecessor, such as phone-in quizzes, celebrity interviews and bands performing in the studio. The premise for the new show was that unlike The Late Late Breakfast Show, which had been broadcast from the BBC's studios each week, the Roadshow would come from a new, different and exotic location each week. These "locations" were in fact elaborate studio sets dressed to resemble each week's location, such as the North Pole, a space station, Hollywood, Niagara Falls. The irony of this was not lost on Edmonds, whose self-deprecating presentation style frequently made light of the low-budget production values.

The programme was a slow-burning success and, following the third series in 1990, Edmonds's popularity and reputation were sufficiently re-established with the public for him to pitch his idea for Noel's House Party to the BBC.

The show introduced regular features such as the Gunge Tank, the Gotcha Oscars and Wait 'Til I Get You Home, which would all be carried across and subsequently developed in House Party. Another item was Clown Court, in which a guest actor from a TV series would be on trial for all the bloopers made during the shooting of that show, for example Sylvester McCoy for the title role of Doctor Who, and Tony Robinson for his character of Baldrick in Blackadder the Third.

=== Noel's House Party ===
By 1991, the Saturday Roadshow morphed into Noel's House Party, which ran for eight years, from Edmonds' mansion in the fictional village of Crinkley Bottom. Regular features included NTV, in which cameras were secretly hidden in viewers' homes, often in VHS tape cases. There was also the "Gotchas", with celebrities caught in elaborate and embarrassing set-up situations.

In one incident NTV's hidden cameras caught celebrity psychic Uri Geller apparently bending a spoon with his hands while demonstrating his "powers" to a member of the public. When then-Radio 1 DJ Dave Lee Travis was "Gotcha'd" live on Radio 1, he infamously yelled "Edmonds, you are a dead man!" He later participated when Edmonds himself was "Gotcha'd". Mr Blobby, a pink and yellow spotted character, initially appeared in the "Gotcha" section, and became a regular feature of the programme. The character even achieved the 1993 Christmas No. 1.

Noel's House Party was a staple of BBC1's autumn and spring schedules throughout the 1990s. The show regularly attracted audiences of over 15 million but along with the general decline in the traditional Saturday night ratings by the time it ended it was pulling in less than 8 million. In the final programme, broadcast on 20 March 1999, Edmonds signed off with thanks to the audience and the wish that history would be kind to the programme.

=== Deal or No Deal ===
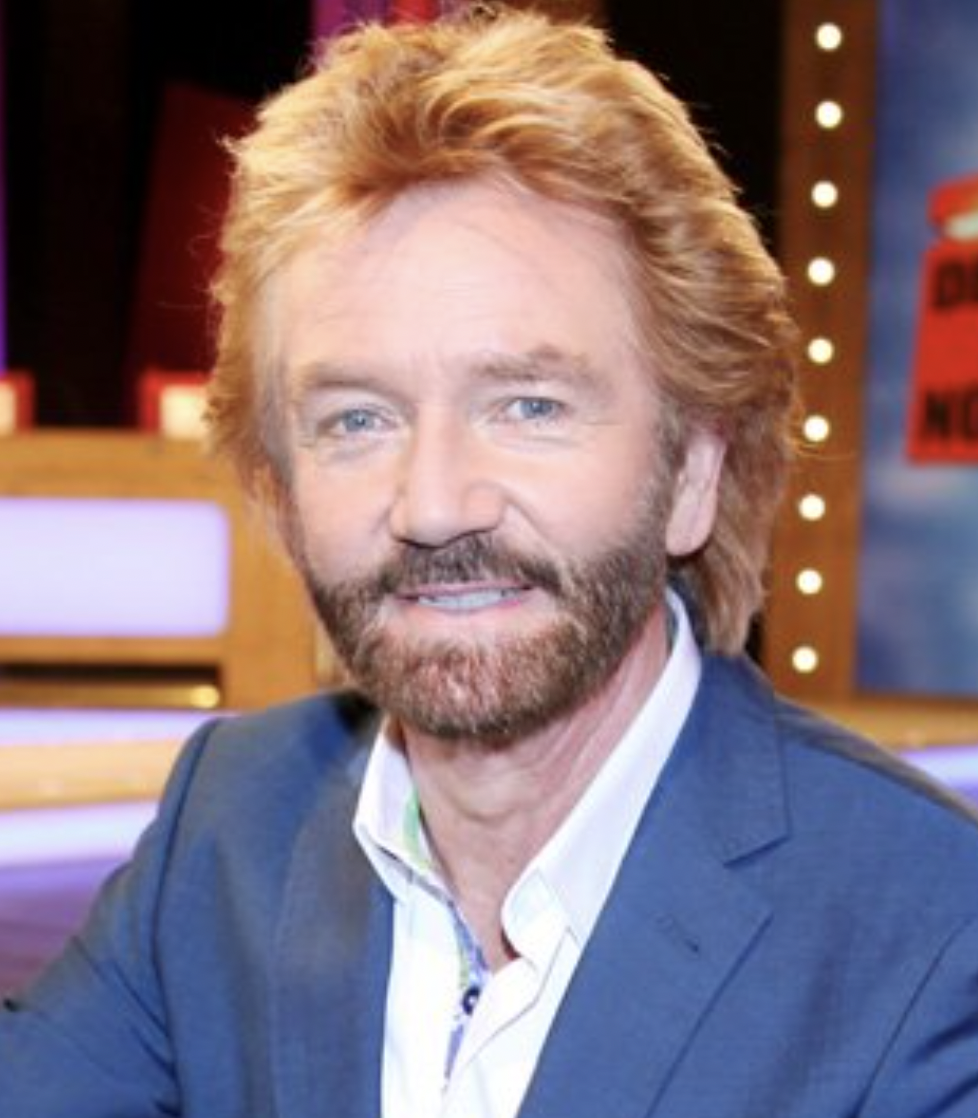
Edmonds presented the Channel 4 game show Deal or No Deal between 2005 and 2016

In 2005, Edmonds was persuaded back to TV presentation by Peter Bazalgette, then CEO of Endemol, which was experiencing great success with its new game show format of Deal or No Deal. Edmonds initially declined the approach, citing that he was concentrating on business interests, but eventually agreed to host a short run of 66 shows. The programme was initially recorded at Paintworks in Bristol but later moved to a dedicated studio in The Bottle Yard Studios in 2014. Deal or No Deal began UK transmission on 31 October 2005, and was broadcast on afternoons, and occasionally evenings, six days a week. In March 2006 Edmonds had his contract for presenting Deal or No Deal extended until autumn 2007, for a fee rumoured to be £3 million, making him one of the highest-paid personalities on UK television. In 2006, Edmonds was nominated for a BAFTA Television Award for his work on the programme but lost out on the night to Jonathan Ross.

On 16 March 2007, Edmonds made a cameo appearance as himself in a sketch with Catherine Tate who appeared in the guise of her character Joanie "Nan" Taylor from The Catherine Tate Show. Nan appeared on a special episode of Deal or No Deal, where she ended up cheating. The sketch was made for the BBC Red Nose Day fundraising programme of 2007.

Deal or No Deal ran for 11 years and almost 3,000 shows were recorded, with over £40m being given away during its run. Celebrity specials were aired sporadically between 2012 and 2015. In the summer of 2016 by mutual agreement Edmonds and Channel 4 agreed to end the show. In celebration of one of UK TV's longest and most popular gameshow runs, the final shows were recorded on location. Games were filmed on a Boeing 737, the Flying Scotsman, atop the Blackpool Tower and down a cave in Somerset.

=== Work with Sky ===
On 24 May 2007, Sky One announced that Edmonds would host the UK version of the American hit Are You Smarter than a 5th Grader?, titled Are You Smarter than a 10 Year Old?. The programme made its debut on Sky One on 7 October 2007. Edmonds hosted the peak-time showing of the programme, with the daily programme being presented by Dick & Dom.

Sky1's autumn 2008 season saw Edmonds host Noel's HQ, a new live entertainment show with a philanthropic purpose, his fees going to a charitable trust. This was later developed into a series. The show received a negative review from The Guardian. Sky edited a repeat broadcast after Edmonds launched an extended verbal attack on a council press officer. In March 2009, Sky1 announced the cancellation of the show.

=== Other television appearances ===
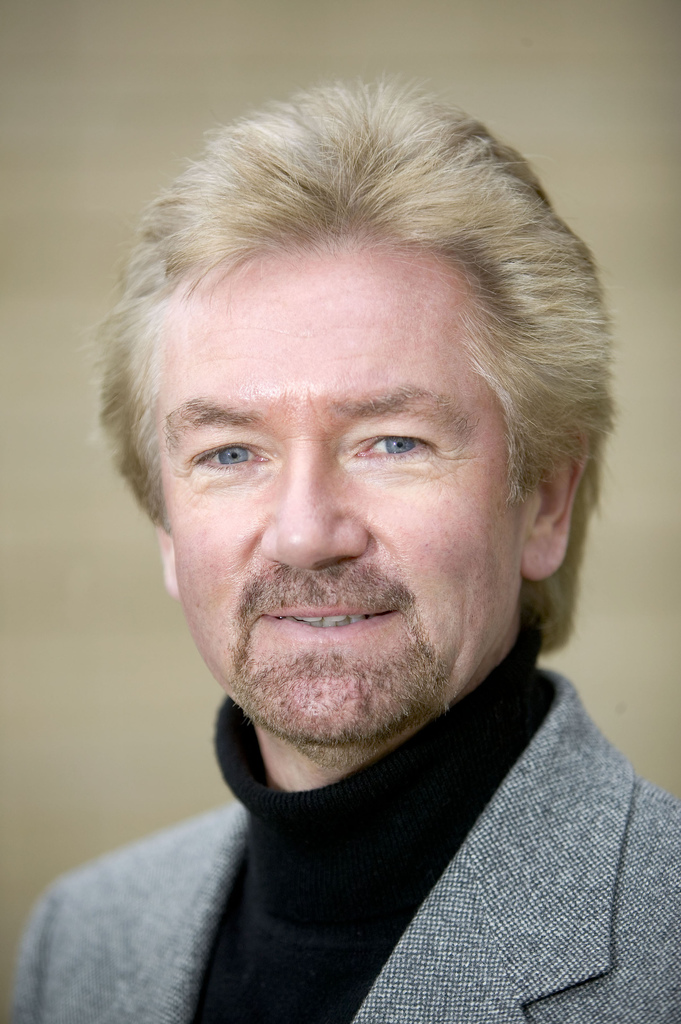
Edmonds in 2006

Edmonds has hosted major TV events including the BAFTA Awards, the Brit Awards and the launch of the UK National Lottery. Edmonds was involved in the Live Aid concerts in 1985, transporting stars to and from the Wembley Stadium concert via helicopter and appearing on stage at Wembley to introduce the joint set by Sting and Phil Collins. Edmonds also took Collins to Heathrow Airport, where Collins boarded Concorde to fly to the United States to perform at the Philadelphia concert.

Noel's Christmas Presents was an annual broadcast in which Edmonds delivered special presents to special people. Some of the gifts included arranging trips to Lapland for ill or disadvantaged children, or arranging family reunions. Noel's Christmas Presents was originally broadcast on BBC One on Christmas Day from 1989 until 1999 (except 1992), before it returned to UK screens courtesy of Sky1 on 23 December 2007. Further editions were screened on 21 December 2008, 20 December 2009, 18 December 2010 and 18 December 2011.

In 2017 Edmonds presented Cheap Cheap Cheap, a cross between a sitcom and a game show. Edmonds came up with the concept, produced by Hat Trick. Channel 4 commissioned 30 episodes, each an hour long. The action took place in 'Noel's Store' and according to the Radio Times, "contestants are presented with three similar items – be it laundry detergent, noodles, baked beans, coffins, live poultry or lottery tickets – and must identify the cheapest one of the three in order to win money." A cast of actors play workers at the store. Stuart Heritage of The Guardian said that "It's like watching a weird piece of existential Lithuanian amateur community theatre [...] It's the worst idea in the world, stretched out for all eternity". The Daily Telegraph's Ed Power described it as "naff, tacky and numbingly dull" and "mind-bendingly outlandish".

The Curse of Noel Edmonds, a documentary tracing the rise and fall of his showbiz career, was transmitted by Five on 9 November 2004, with former Radio 1 DJ Mike Read being one of the contributors to the programme. On 27 August 2022, Edmonds was the subject of an in-depth documentary on Channel 5, titled Noel Edmonds: The Rise & Fall of Mr. Saturday Night. The show documented the highs and lows of Edmonds' career to date.

In 2025, ITV offered a glimpse into Noel's new life in New Zealand with a three-part documentary series Noel Edmonds’ Kiwi Adventure, after he set up a new life there with wife Liz.

==== I'm a Celebrity... Get Me Out of Here! ====
In November 2018, Edmonds participated in the eighteenth series of I'm a Celebrity...Get Me Out of Here!. Edmonds' appearance fee of £600,000 made him the highest paid participant ever in the show's history up to that date.

Edmonds was the first celebrity to leave the series when he was voted out on 30 November 2018. Many fans of the show were surprised by the departure, with Radio 1 Breakfast Show host Greg James described as "furious and sad".

== Business ventures ==
=== Unique Group ===
In 1985, Edmonds formed the Unique Group, which consisted of various operations. The Unique Broadcasting Company Media Group plc (UBCMG) was an independent producer of audio programming in the UK, supplying BBC and independent radio. Michael Peacock was an executive of the group between 1989 and 2005, and former Radio 1 controller Johnny Beerling joined the group following his departure from the network in 1993. It owned Classic Gold Digital before selling the stations back to GCap Media which merged them into the Gold network. Edmonds resigned as non-executive director of UBCMG in March 2006 as a direct result of the success of Deal or No Deal. As of 2006, Edmonds also had interests in Unique Motor Company, a producer of small off-road vehicles, including the Qpod.

In July 2019, Edmonds agreed to a compensation deal with Lloyds Banking Group as a victim of the HBOS Reading branch fraud. He had claimed that bank staff had destroyed Unique Group.

=== Theme parks ===
Edmonds-licensed theme park attractions based on Crinkley Bottom and Mr Blobby were set up in existing parks at Cricket St Thomas in Somerset and Pleasurewood Hills Theme Park in Lowestoft, Suffolk. A park was also built in Morecambe, Lancashire, on the site of the former Happy Mount Park. Following disappointing visitor numbers, and in the case of Morecambe, legal disputes with the local council, the deal was scrapped and the park closed. The two existing parks reverted to their previous state. Edmonds was said to be very critical of Lancaster city council's management of the Morecambe park.

A report by the district auditor found that the council had behaved 'unlawfully' in its dealings with Edmonds, which cost £2.5m, and two former senior officers were found to have committed 'misconduct', although this was not deemed to be 'wilful'. The affair was dubbed 'Blobbygate' by the media.

== Personal life ==
Edmonds married Gillian Slater in 1971. The marriage ended in divorce after 11 years. From July 1986 to 2005, he was married to Helen Soby; the couple have four daughters. In July 2009, Edmonds married his third wife, Liz Davies, who was a make-up artist on the programme Deal or No Deal when they first met.

Edmonds is a licensed helicopter pilot, and one of his early personal aircraft was registered G-NOEL. He was president of the British Horse Society between 2004 and 2007.

On 27 September 2015, Edmonds received an award from the Atlantic Award Group for his extensive contributions to broadcasting. The selection process was initiated by a nomination by a viewer of Deal or No Deal. Edmonds was the first TV personality to receive an award from the AAG and was also the first recipient from the UK in 2015.

In June 2017 Edmonds said he had attempted suicide in 2005, after fraud by a group of HBOS financiers destroyed his Unique Group business: "Until these criminals took me to the brink of emotional annihilation, I had always felt those who opt out by taking their own lives were selfish and cowardly... But having been cast into that bottomless dark space devoid of logic and reason, I have a much deeper understanding of life without hope... I seek no sympathy and feel no shame in admitting that on the evening of January 18th 2005 I attempted to end the overwhelming mental pain which had consumed my whole being." In September 2017, Edmonds said there was a direct link between fraudulent HBOS financiers causing stress and his prostate cancer. He stated: "I don't say cancer was caused by the stress, but that my health deteriorated to such an extent I got prostate cancer. I am absolutely sure the negative forces acting on me impacted on my health. There is a wealth of information from various clinical studies of a direct link between stress and cancer. I am absolutely certain there was a link in my case."

Edmonds and his wife decided to move to New Zealand in 2015 and eventually emigrated in 2019; during the COVID lockdown he set up 100 online community radio stations called Positivity Radio. He currently lives in Ngātīmoti, in the South Island, with his wife, having gained residency permission in February 2020. Living in the country since the previous September, Edmonds said he and his wife had felt an "incredible spiritual pull" on a visit in 2016, leading them to settle in the country. During the summer months, Edmonds lives on the Isle of Man.

=== Political views ===
Edmonds was chairman of the Renewable Energy Foundation (REF), an organisation which is staunchly opposed to wind farms. He was said to have joined "because of the threat near his home in Devon". He has been quoted as saying that, "Politicians are promoting the wind industry as a green icon, but they are misleading the public into believing the propaganda of the wind industry. The reality is that wind power is too costly and can never meet our energy needs; but it will destroy the countryside". His view is that those who are promoting wind farms are energy companies with a vested financial interest, and that wind turbines are not reliable enough as a source of sustainable energy.

Edmonds is an outspoken critic of immigration and the BBC's Welsh language service.

He coordinated the Heart of Devon campaign to provide information for farmers affected by the foot and mouth epidemic in 2001.

=== TV licence boycott ===
Edmonds said that he had stopped payment on his TV licence in early 2008, in response to the sometimes controversial methods used to enforce collection of the TV licence fee. Edmonds said that it is wrong to "threaten" and "badger" people, in response to the collection authority's common assumption that the non-possession of a licence can mean licence evasion, as well as the large fines which can be used as enforcement for non-payment. TV Licensing later claimed that Edmonds did possess a valid current TV licence, but this claim was denied by a spokesman for Edmonds.

In March 2014, Edmonds declared on Newsnight that he was part of a consortium which planned to buy the BBC, because the corporation was "sleepwalking itself to destruction". He said that he did not have a TV licence and only watched BBC programmes on catch-up.

=== Spiritualism ===
For many years, Edmonds has been a believer in spiritualism, in particular the concept of cosmic ordering, a subject he became interested in after being introduced to Bärbel Mohr's book The Cosmic Ordering Service – A Guide to Realising Your Dreams by his reflexologist. He had not worked on TV since the end of his BBC TV show Noel's House Party in 1999 and one of his wishes was for a new challenge. Later he was offered the chance to return to TV to work on Deal or No Deal. Edmonds later went on to write his own book titled Positively Happy: Cosmic Ways To Change Your Life.

Edmonds said in 2008 that he is constantly accompanied by two melon-sized "spiritual energy" balls, which appear over his shoulders and which he believes to be the spirits of his dead parents. "Orbs are little bundles of positive energy and they think they can move between 500 and 1,000 miles per hour," according to Edmonds. "They look like little round planets but they come in all shapes and sizes." He has asserted that the orbs appear only on digital photographs.

In August 2015, Edmonds gave an interview to the Daily Mirror in which he stated that the greatest problem facing humanity was "electrosmog" due to Wi-Fi and other "systems", causing the destruction of "our natural electro-magnetic fields". He also stated a belief that death was impossible because the body was merely a container for "a universal energy", and that this had "been known for a very long time". When he dies, Edmonds anticipates that "My energy will return to where it came from – part of a massive, incomprehensible universal web of energy".

=== EMP Pad ===
On 7 June 2016, Edmonds said on Twitter that an electromagnetic pulse device costing £2,315 was "A simple box that slows ageing, reduces pain, lifts depression and stress and tackles cancer. Yep tackles cancer!". Edmonds provoked further criticism after tweeting to a man with kidney cancer, lymph node metastases and psoriatic arthritis that "Scientific fact-disease is caused by negative energy. Is it possible your ill health is caused by your negative attitude? #explore." The following day, Edmonds was interviewed by Phillip Schofield and Holly Willoughby on ITV's This Morning television programme stating that he had been diagnosed with prostate cancer in November 2013. He said that a "very stressful, very negative period" in life had caused his prostate cancer, "I was, I thought, very, very healthy. I know why I got my cancer... the definition of stress is negative energy. It didn't just decide to manifest itself, there was cause". He went on to add: "I then had my tumour destroyed by sound waves, proving yet again energy is at the heart of this issue" and said that "I believe pulsed electromagnetism has a role to play in tackling cancer and I will always believe that".

In response, the firm responsible for the device, EMP Pad Limited, said it did not agree with his claim "in any way, shape or form", and that it had not paid him in relation to it. While EMP Pad said it did not pay Edmonds to promote the product, the company's owner Maria Robertson, previously worked as an assistant to the TV presenter and acknowledged having known Edmonds for 25 years and having worked with him and his daughter. Cancer Research UK produced an article to reassure the public that "the best studies looking at this topic have failed to show a link between emotional stress and an increased risk of cancer" and that "no reliable evidence has ever been produced that Rife machines – or any similar devices producing low-frequency electromagnetic pulses – have any benefit for cancer patients. Nor have organisations that scrutinise new treatments and devices (like the US Food and Drug Authority or the European Medicines Agency) approved any as a therapy for any type of disease".

David Grimes, a cancer researcher at the University of Oxford, told This Morning: "It's not just untrue, it's patronising and victim blaming, cancer is bad luck... the healthiest people in the world get cancer and it's not because they are negative". Prof. John Gribben, chair of medical oncology at Queen Mary University of London, said: "This is complete gibberish and undermines all the good work everyone does with evidence-based medicine and targeted approaches". Edzard Ernst, emeritus professor at the University of Exeter said: "The reason why most of us put 'negative energy' in inverted commas is simple: it is a pure figment of the imagination of fantasists. That would not be so bad except that, as we see, some VIPs seem to take this nonsense seriously. The result might be that some desperate patients believe them, and choose the nonsense over the best that real medicine has to offer. And that could hasten deaths."

In 2016 the UK's Advertising Standards Authority said that it was "urgently looking into" a complaint made over the claims, because advertising any proven or unproven cancer treatment would violate the Cancer Act 1939 if payments had been made. Later the ASA said that no rules had been broken. The same year the Medicines and Healthcare products Regulatory Agency said that it was investigating the products available from EMP Pad "to determine whether there are any breaches of the Medical Device Regulations 2002".

=== Dispute with Lloyds Bank ===
A major turning point for Edmonds was the 2005 collapse of his entertainment company Unique Group – an umbrella for various production companies that owned the rights to, among other things, Mr Blobby and Telly Addicts. Edmonds held Lloyds Bank responsible, because it had acquired HBOS, whose Reading branch was involved in the alleged scam. Edmonds sought £60m in losses and damages. Edmonds complained to the Advertising Standards Authority about the "By Your Side" Lloyds marketing campaign, claiming it was hypocritical; the complaint was not upheld. In 2017, the HBOS bankers and others involved in the scam were found guilty of committing fraud and jailed. In 2019 it was reported that the dispute was settled, with Lloyds Bank Group agreeing a compensation deal with Edmonds, and apologising to him for the "distress" he had suffered.

=== Lobstergate ===
In August 2026, Noel Edmonds faced backlash for buying lobsters from a tank and putting them back into the harbour. The story went viral in the news, with Katie Hopkins also making a viral video about it.

== Filmography ==
Year	Title	Role	Channel	Notes
1970	Come Dancing	Himself/Presenter	BBC1	1 episode
1972–1981	Top of the Pops	Himself/Presenter	BBC1	76 episodes
1973	Disney Time	Himself/Presenter	BBC1	1 episode
1974	Going a Bundle	Self	Southern TV	1 episode
1975	Call My Bluff	Self	BBC2	2 episodes; series 9
1975	Seaside Special	Self/Presenter	BBC1	3 episodes
1976	New Faces	Self/Panellist	ATV	7 episodes
1976–1981	Star Turn	Self	BBC1	8 episodes
1976–1982	Multi-Coloured Swap Shop	Self/Presenter	BBC1	165 episodes
1977–1978	Blue Peter	Self	BBC1	2 episodes
1978–1979	Lucky Numbers	Self/Presenter	BBC1	17 episodes
1979	Juke Box Jury	Self/Presenter	BBC1	10 episodes
1979–1999	Top Gear	Self	BBC2	26 episodes
1982–1986	The Late, Late Breakfast Show	Self/Presenter	BBC1	79 episodes
1983–1985	The Time of Your Life	Self/Presenter	BBC1	37 episodes
1984	The Montreux Golden Rose Pop Festival	Self/Presenter	BBC1	3 episodes
1984–1988	Christmas Morning with Noel	Self/Presenter	BBC1	aka The Live Live Christmas Breakfast Show (1984-85)
1985–1998	Telly Addicts	Self/Presenter	BBC1	83 episodes
1986	The Noel Edmonds Show	Self	ABC	Television pilot
1987–1988	Whatever Next...	Self/Presenter	BBC1	16 episodes
1988	The Britannia Music Awards	Self/Presenter	BBC1	Awards ceremony
1988–1990	The Noel Edmonds Saturday Roadshow	Self/Presenter	BBC1	48 episodes
1988–1993	Going Live!	Self	Children's BBC	6 episodes
1989–1999	Noel's Christmas Presents	Self/Presenter	BBC1	7 episodes
1991–1999	Noel's House Party	Self/Presenter	BBC1	168 episodes
1993	Mr Blobby	Self	BBC1/VHS	Music video
1993	The Detectives	Self	BBC1	1 episode
1994	The National Lottery Live	Self/Presenter	BBC1	Launch show
1995–1997	Live & Kicking	Self/Guest	Children's BBC	"Hot Seat" interviewee
1996–1997	Noel's Telly Years	Self/Presenter	BBC1	20 episodes
1997	Noel's Le Mans Dream	Self	BBC Two	Documentary
1997	Brass Eye	Self	Channel 4	Prank victim
1998	Red Dwarf A-Z	Self	BBC Two	Television film
1999	Faking It	Self	Channel 4	Television film
1999	The World of the Secret Camera	Self/Presenter	BBC One	3 part series
1999	Kirsty Young Interviews	Self/Guest	Channel 5	Television special, interviewee
2003	Loose Women	Guest	ITV1	1 episode
2004	The Curse of Noel Edmonds	Self; archive footage only	Five	Mockumentary
2005–2016	Deal or No Deal	Self/Presenter	Channel 4	3,001 episodes in total
2006	It Started With Swap Shop	Self/Presenter	BBC Two	Television special
2006	Parkinson	Self/Guest	ITV1	1 episode
2006	National Lottery Day: Everyone's a Winner	Self/Presenter	BBC One	Television special
2006–2007	TV Burp	Self/Cameo	ITV1	Both archive and original footage
2007	The Friday Night Project	Self/Presenter	Channel 4	Guest host
2007	Red Nose Day 2007	Self	BBC One	Sketch with Catherine Tate
2007–2011	Noel's Christmas Presents (revival)	Self/Presenter	Sky One	5 specials
2008–2009	Noel's HQ	Self/Presenter	Sky One	6 episodes
2008–2010	Are You Smarter than a 10 Year Old?	Self/Presenter	Sky One	11 episodes
2011–2018	This Morning	Self	ITV	8 episodes
2012	Run for Your Wife	Man in shop	N/A	Direct-to-DVD film
2013	The Sarah Millican Television Programme	Self	BBC Two	Guest, Series 2 Episode 2
2012–2015	Celebrity Deal or No Deal	Presenter	Channel 4	14 specials
2014	The Life of Rock with Brian Pern	Self	BBC Four	Mockumentary
2014	Newsnight	Self	BBC Two	Guest
2014	The Fight for Saturday Night	Self	BBC Four	Television special
2014	The Late Late Show	Self/Guest	RTÉ One	1 episode, 10 October 2014
2016	Deal or No Deal on Tour	Presenter	Channel 4	10 episodes
2016	Noel's Sell or Swap Live	Presenter	Channel 4	Television special
2017	Cheap Cheap Cheap	Self/Presenter	Channel 4	30 episodes; also creator and writer
2018	Victoria Derbyshire	Self/Guest	BBC News	1 episode
2018	Eight Go Rallying: The Road to Saigon	Self	BBC Two	4 episodes
2018	I'm a Celebrity...Get Me Out of Here!	Self	ITV	11 episodes
2021	Ant & Dec's Saturday Night Takeaway	The Overlord	ITV	1 episode
2021	Banksters	Self	N/A	Documentary film
2022	Noel Edmonds: The Rise & Fall of Mr. Saturday Night	Self; archive footage only	Channel 5	Documentary
2022	Oxide Ghosts: The Brass Eye Tapes	Self; archive footage only	N/A	Documentary
2025	Noel Edmonds' Kiwi Adventure	Self	ITV	3 episodes, Documentary

Media offices
Preceded by Tony Blackburn	BBC Radio 1 Breakfast Show Presenter; 1973–1978	Succeeded by Dave Lee Travis
