= Introducing Tony Ferrino - Who? And Why? - A Quest =

- Written by: Steve Coogan; Peter Baynham
- Directed by: Geoff Posner
- Starring: Steve Coogan
- Country of origin: United Kingdom

Production
- Producers: Geoff Posner; David Tyler
- Production company: BBC

Original release
- Network: BBC Two
- Release: 2 January 1997

Related
- The Tony Ferrino Phenomenon

Introducing Tony Ferrino - Who? And Why? A Quest was a mockumentary about the life of Tony Ferrino, the parody Portuguese musical megastar played by Steve Coogan. It was written by Coogan and produced by Pozzitive Television.

The interview followed on from The Tony Ferrino Phenomenon, broadcast on New Year's Day, 1997, a spoof concert given by Tony Ferrino (Coogan) which featured pop stars Mick Hucknall, Kim Wilde and Gary Wilmot in cameo roles.

Introducing Tony Ferrino - Who? And Why? A Quest was broadcast the next day, ostensibly as a follow-up interview to maintain the illusion that Tony Ferrino was a real character, in which Peter Baynham joined Coogan as the slightly put-upon interviewer Ross Woollard.

== Reception ==
The character of Tony Ferrino was positively received, with The Tony Ferrino Phenomenon winning a Silver Rose at the Rose D'Or awards in Montreaux. Coogan revived the character in his 1998 national tour 'The Man Who Thinks He's It', described by The Guardian as "raucously funny".
