= Noel's Christmas Presents =

- Also known as: All-Star Christmas Presents (2012)
- Genre: Entertainment
- Presented by: Noel Edmonds (1989–99, 2007-11); Sally Lindsay (2012)
- Country of origin: United Kingdom
- Original language: English
- No. of episodes: 11 (BBC1); 6 (Sky 1)

Production
- Running time: 50–135 minutes
- Production companies: BBC Television (1989–1999); Twofour (2007–12)

Original release
- Network: BBC1 (1989–99); Sky 1 (2007–12)
- Release: 25 December 1989 – 23 December 2012

Noel's Christmas Presents is a British television show hosted by Noel Edmonds that was originally broadcast on Christmas Day on BBC1 in 1989. It was a reformatted live television event which Noel Edmonds had previously presented on BBC1 between 1984-1985, known as The Live Live Christmas Breakfast Show, and "Christmas Morning with Noel" between 1986-1988. Noel's Christmas Presents ran on BBC1 from 1989 to 1999 (except 1992) and then on Sky 1 from 23 December 2007 to 23 December 2012, where special Christmas presents were delivered to well-deserving members of the public. Edmonds did not host the final edition in 2012, which was renamed All-Star Christmas Presents and presented by Sally Lindsay.

The 1991 edition was repeated on 6 March 1993, due to a reported bomb scare at BBC Television Centre, forcing that night's live edition of Noel's House Party off air.

== Transmissions ==
=== BBC1 ===
Airdate	Runtime
25 December 1989	60 minutes
25 December 1990	60 minutes
25 December 1991	60 minutes
25 December 1993	55 minutes
25 December 1994	60 minutes
25 December 1995	70 minutes
25 December 1996	65 minutes
25 December 1997	60 minutes
25 December 1998	60 minutes
25 December 1999	50 minutes

=== Sky 1 ===
Airdate
23 December 2007
21 December 2008
20 December 2009
19 December 2010
18 December 2011
23 December 2012
