= Me and My Girl (TV series) =

British TV sitcom (1984–1988)

- Series One title card
- Genre: Sitcom
- Created by: Keith Leonard; John Kane
- Written by: Bernard McKenna; Colin Bostock-Smith; Mike Walling; Ian Whitham; John Kane; George Layton
- Starring: Richard O'Sullivan; Joanne Ridley; Joan Sanderson; Tim Brooke-Taylor; Leni Harper; Joanne Campbell; Sandra Clark
- Theme music composer: Peter Skellern
- Country of origin: United Kingdom
- Original language: English
- No. of series: 6
- No. of episodes: 52

Production
- Running time: 25 minutes per normal episode.
- Production company: LWT

Original release
- Network: ITV
- Release: 31 August 1984 – 4 November 1988

Me and My Girl is a 1980s British television sitcom, starring Richard O'Sullivan, which centred on the challenges faced by a widower bringing up his adolescent daughter. It was broadcast on ITV between 1984 and 1988.

== Plot ==
Created by Keith Leonard and John Kane, the show was made by London Weekend Television for ITV from 1984 to 1988. It starred Richard O'Sullivan as Simon Harrap and Joanne Ridley as Samantha. Simon runs an advertising agency called Eyecatchers and the series centres on his relationship with his daughter, his business partner Derek Yates played by Tim Brooke-Taylor and a string of romantic liaisons. Simon's mother-in-law, Nell, would frequently interfere in his attempts to raise Samantha alone, but usually had her granddaughter's best interests at heart.

Other writers included Bernard McKenna who also served as script editor, Colin Bostock-Smith, Mike Walling, George Layton and Ian Whitham.

The theme song was written and performed by Peter Skellern.

== Main cast ==
- Simon Harrap (Richard O'Sullivan) – Simon is a middle aged widower as his wife Ruth died about ten years before the series began. He has been bringing up his daughter Samantha since Sam was the age of 3 and struggles to help her as she develops through her teenage years. He is also the Artistic Director of Eyecatchers, a promotions agency based in London.
- Samantha "Sam" Harrap (Joanne Ridley) – Sam is the only daughter of Simon and is a teenager. Her mother died when she was 3 years old and so she doesn't remember her. She seeks the help of the women around her as she develops as a teenager.
- Nell Cresset (Joan Sanderson) – Nell is Simon's mother-in-law and Samantha's grandmother. She is a matriarchal figure and intimidates a lot of men. She has also invested heavily in Eyecatchers and is meant to be a sleeping (or silent) partner but likes to interfere with the running of the business. Despite this she is very kind, cares about her son-in-law a lot and provides the maternal advice Sam needs during her teenage years.
- Derek Yates (Tim Brooke-Taylor) – Derek is the Managing Partner of Eyecatchers and one of Simon's oldest friends. He is married to Muriel (who is never seen) and at the start of the show has three children, Winston, Annabel, and Jessica . Later in the series a fourth child, Adrienne is born. He is portrayed as incompetent as he is henpecked by Muriel.
- Madeleine "Maddie" Dunnock (Leni Harper) – Maddie is the Harraps' first housekeeper. She is Scottish in origin.
- Isobel McClusky (Sandra Clark) – Isobel is the Harraps’ second housekeeper. Like her predecessor she is Scottish in origin. She is fiercely religious often going to confession.
- Liz (Joanne Campbell) – Liz is Eyecatchers’ secretary and an aspiring actress. She works part-time so that she can attend auditions. She is a vivacious character.

== Episodes ==
All episodes listed with their original ITV broadcast date.

Series 1

1. "I Love You Samantha" (31 August 1984)
2. "Design for Loving" (7 September 1984)
3. "The Ideal Husband" (14 September 1984)
4. "The Home Help" (21 September 1984)
5. "Jobs for the Girls" (28 September 1984)
6. "A Clean Slate" (5 October 1984)

Series 2

1. "Love and Kittens" (18 January 1985)
2. "Let's Talk Turkey" (25 January 1985)
3. "Sticky Fingers" (1 February 1985)
4. "The Kids Are Alright" (8 February 1985)
5. "Leaving On a Jet Plane" (15 February 1985)
6. "Swings and Roundabouts" (22 February 1985)
7. "You Tak' the High Road" (1 March 1985)

Series 3

1. "On Approval" (6 October 1985)
2. "Wild About Harry" (13 October 1985)
3. "Dangerous Corner" (18 October 1985)
4. "Goodbye Forever" (25 October 1985)
5. "A Woman of Taste" (1 November 1985)
6. "Put Yourself in My Place" (8 November 1985)
7. "Sam Who?" (15 November 1985)
8. "One Wild and Foolish Moment" (22 November 1985)
9. "Forty Years On" (29 November 1985)
10. "Picture of Harmony" (6 December 1985)
11. "An Inspector Calls" (13 December 1985)
12. "Nothing Like a Quiet Sunday" (20 December 1985)
13. "Faraway Places" (27 December 1985)

Series 4

1. "Love's Young Dream" (10 January 1987)
2. "Marriage in Haste" (17 January 1987)
3. "The Rhinoceros and the Pussycat" (24 January 1987)
4. "Poor Uncle Derek" (31 January 1987)
5. "The Lost Weekend" (7 February 1987)
6. "Kissing Cousins" (14 February 1987)
7. "French Leave" (21 February 1987)
8. "A Single Night of Love" (28 February 1987)
9. "Lost and Found" (7 March 1987)
10. "A Star Is Gorn" (14 March 1987)
11. "Pulling Power" (21 March 1987)
12. "An Offer You Can't Refuse" (28 March 1987)
13. "Waiting for Adrian" (4 April 1987)

Series 5

1. "Like An Old Time Movie" (8 January 1988)
2. "Thinking About Fluffy" (15 January 1988)
3. "Question Time" (22 January 1988)
4. "A Couple of Rough Nights" (29 January 1988)
5. "Play Your Cards Right" (5 February 1988)
6. "Love Thy Neighbour" (12 February 1988)

Series 6

1. "I Wonder Who's Kissing Him Now?" (23 September 1988)
2. "My Second Best Friend" (30 September 1988)
3. "The Story of Foxy-Features and Melon-Head" (7 October 1988)
4. "Mundane Monday" (14 October 1988)
5. "Only the Lonely" (21 October 1988)
6. "When You're Smiling" (28 October 1988)
7. "A Bit of Overtime" (4 November 1988)

== Filming ==
As was common at the time, most of the programme was shot in studio sets at London Weekend Television's South Bank studios. Most of the action revolves around the locations of the Harrap family home and Eyecatchers offices. Outdoor scenes were filmed in London. The Harraps’ family home was located in Little Venice, London and there are scenes filmed by the canal and the junction of Blomfield Road and Westbourne Terrace Road. The Eyecatchers office is in Covent Garden and there are scenes filmed in this area.

The opening sequence was filmed at Three Cliffs Bay, Gower. In the depiction of the Simon Harrap character in his 'younger self', Richard O'Sullivan is made up in a similar costume and hairstyle as his character Robin Tripp from Man About the House and Robin's Nest - it is unclear if this is a deliberate in-joke.
