= The Noel Edmonds Saturday Roadshow =

BBC entertainment television series

- Genre: Entertainment
- Presented by: Noel Edmonds
- Theme music composer: Ernie Dunstall; Joe Longthorne
- Country of origin: United Kingdom
- Original language: English
- No. of series: 3
- No. of episodes: 48

Production
- Running time: 45 minutes

Original release
- Network: BBC1
- Release: 3 September 1988 – 15 December 1990

Related
- The Late, Late Breakfast Show; Noel's House Party

The Noel Edmonds Saturday Roadshow is a BBC television light entertainment show which was broadcast on Saturday evenings from 3 September 1988 to 15 December 1990. It was presented by Noel Edmonds, his first major TV project since the demise of The Late, Late Breakfast Show in 1986. The pre-recorded programme contained several elements which had been found in its predecessor, such as phone-in quizzes, celebrity interviews and bands performing in the studio.

The programme was a slow-burning success, and following the third series in 1990, Edmonds' popularity and reputation were sufficiently re-established with the public for Edmonds to pitch Noel's House Party to the BBC, which began in November 1991.

== Format ==
The premise for the new show was that unlike The Late, Late Breakfast Show, which had been broadcast from the BBC's studios each week, the Roadshow would come from a new, different and exotic location each week. These 'locations' were in fact elaborate studio sets dressed to resemble each week's location, such as the North Pole, a space station, Hollywood, or Niagara Falls. The ironically cheap production values of these sets were frequently made light of by Edmonds.

=== Features ===
The show also introduced regular features such as the Gunge Tank, the "Gotcha Oscars" and "Wait 'Till I Get You Home", which would all be carried across and subsequently developed in Noel's House Party.

The Gunge Tank was a booth with a large tank of slime at the top. A member of the public would sit inside and try to win prizes by answering a set number of questions before their time ran out. If they failed they would be 'gunged' by Noel Edmonds who would pull a lever at the side of the tank to empty the gunge over the contestant.

Another item was "Clown Court", where a guest actor from a TV series would be on trial for all the bloopers made during the shooting of that show, such as Sylvester McCoy in the title role of Doctor Who, and Tony Robinson as his character of Baldrick in Blackadder the Third.

== Transmissions ==
Series	Start date	End date	Episodes
1	3 September 1988	17 December 1988	16
2	2 September 1989	16 December 1989	16
3	1 September 1990	15 December 1990	16
