= Cheap Cheap Cheap =

2017 British TV game show

- Genre: Game show
- Created by: Noel Edmonds
- Directed by: Steve Smith
- Presented by: Noel Edmonds
- Starring: Gabby Best; Emily Lloyd-Saini; Alex Lowe; Kiell Smith-Bynoe
- Composers: Dan McGrath; Josh Phillips
- Country of origin: United Kingdom
- Original language: English
- No. of series: 1
- No. of episodes: 30

Production
- Executive producers: Jimmy Mulville; Helen Williams; Richard Wilson
- Producers: Neil Gallery; Monica Long
- Production location: The Bottle Yard Studios
- Cinematography: Andy Robertson
- Editors: Cas Casey; Duncan Armstrong
- Camera setup: Multiple-camera setup
- Running time: 45 minutes
- Production company: Hat Trick Productions

Original release
- Network: Channel 4
- Release: 14 August – 22 September 2017

Cheap Cheap Cheap was a British television game show produced by Hat Trick Productions for Channel 4, presented and created by Noel Edmonds. Billed as "a game show that thinks it's a sitcom", the show takes place in a fictional general store and centres on a game show, hosted by the store owner (Edmonds). He is joined by the shop's eccentric staff, played by actors who appear throughout the game.

Edmonds conceived the idea and showed it to the Hat Trick Productions managing director Jimmy Mulville. The pair agreed to develop the premise and filmed the show's pilot episode after the production company constructed a studio inside a recreation area in Somerset. The television channel Channel 4 viewed the pilot and ordered a series of thirty episodes to be filmed.

Pairs of contestants are invited up to win an increasing amount of money by correctly picking the cheapest of three similar items, taken from the shop's stock. If they fail to guess the cheapest item they are eliminated from the game and lose all their money. The maximum amount of winnable money was £25,000.
