= Gary Wilmot =

British actor (born 1954)

Gary Wilmot MBE
- Born: Harold Owen Wilmot; 8 May 1954 (age 72); Lambeth, London, England
- Occupation: Actor
- Years active: 1978–present
- Children: 2
- Website: garywilmot.co.uk

Harold Owen "Gary" Wilmot (born 8 May 1954) is a British actor who rose to fame as a contestant on New Faces.

As a television presenter, he is best known as the host of You and Me, So You Want To Be Top and Showstoppers. His West End credits include Me and My Girl, Chitty Chitty Bang Bang, Dirty Rotten Scoundrels, The Prince of Egypt, and Wicked.

Wilmot was appointed Member of the Order of the British Empire (MBE) in the 2018 Birthday Honours for services to drama and charity.

== Early life ==
Wilmot was born in Lambeth, London, into a mixed-race household; his mother was English, and his father, Harry, was Jamaican and arrived in Britain on the Empire Windrush in 1948. Harry was a member of vocal harmony group The Southlanders, but died in 1961, when his sons were still young. Despite these show business roots, Wilmot's upbringing was outside of the limelight; his mother suffered poor health and could only work part-time jobs, meaning they had to rely on family allowance. Wilmot worked on building sites and in warehouses and factories, but soon realised he did not wish to continue in this line of work.

== Television ==
Wilmot started his career in entertainment in the variety circuit. His big break came in 1978, when he featured as part of a comedy double act with Judy McPhee on New Faces; the pair were later finalists. This would lead to numerous television appearances on Copy Cats, Knees Ups, Cue Gary!, and The Keith Harris Show. One of his most notable television roles was with the BBC children's quiz show So You Want to Be Top?, which he co-presented with Leni Harper.

In 1994, Wilmot hosted Showstoppers, a programme which featured him performing songs from musicals alongside special guests. Originally commissioned as a one-off series in which celebrities were given ten days to learn and perform a song, Wilmot was asked to record a further series of six spectaculars due to popular demand. He also starred in and directed a tour of Showstoppers which proved so popular that its original sixty dates were increased to one hundred and sixty.

== Theatre ==
In 1989, Wilmot made a move into musical theatre debuting in the West End production of Me and My Girl, playing the role of Bill Snibson at the Adelphi Theatre. He played the role to critical acclaim for two years, with Jack Tinker describing him as a "Musical Talent of the Highest Order". Wilmot was subsequently nominated in the "Best Actor" category at the Olivier Awards, and theatre tour of a new comedy, Teething Troubles followed. He was also cast as Joe in Carmen Jones at the Old Vic before starring in the world premiere of the Barry Manilow musical Copacabana at London's Prince of Wales Theatre.

In 2001, Wilmot joined The New Shakespeare Company to play Bottom in A Midsummer Night's Dream at the Open Air Theatre, Regent's Park, and the Pirate King in The Pirates of Penzance national tour with Su Pollard as Ruth, in 2001–2002. The national tour of Giles Havergal's adaptation of the Graham Greene novel Travels with My Aunt followed. In 2003, he was Caractacus Potts in Chitty Chitty Bang Bang at the London Palladium, taking over from Michael Ball, and returning in 2006 and 2007 on the UK tour. Wilmot also played Billy Flynn in the national touring company of Chicago.

Other stage productions Wilmot has appeared in include H.M.S. Pinafore, Santa Claus the Musical, Oliver!, Half a Sixpence, The Wizard of Oz, The Goodbye Girl, One for the Road, Confusions, Lord Arthur Saville's Crime, and a national tour of the successful Watermill Newbury Theatre production of Radio Times.

Wilmot has recently appeared in Flowers for Mrs Harris at Chichester Festival Theatre, Little Miss Sunshine at the Arcola Theatre, Mr Gum and the Dancing Bear - the Musical! at the National Theatre, London, Jethro in The Prince of Egypt at the Dominion Theatre, The Wizard in Wicked at the Apollo Victoria Theatre and Elisha J. Whitney in Anything Goes at the Barbican Centre in the West End.

Wilmot has also appeared in many pantomimes since 1986. Most recently he has appeared as the dame in the London Palladium pantomimes for Qdos Entertainment such as Dick Whittington (2017), Snow White (2018) and Goldilocks and the Three Bears (2019) co-starring Julian Clary, Paul Zerdin and Nigel Havers.

In September 2026, Wilmot will make his Royal Shakespeare Company debut as Duke Frederick / Duke Senior in Daniel Evans' all-male production of As You Like It at the Royal Shakespeare Theatre, Stratford-upon-Avon.

== Music ==
Wilmot's solo albums include Love Situation, The Album, and Double Standards.

In 1991, Wilmot teamed up with record producer Nigel Wright to record a medley featuring songs from Walt Disney film The Jungle Book. "The Bare Necessities Megamix" was a medley of "I Wanna Be Like You" and "The Bare Necessities", released under Wright's UK Mixmasters name. The record, executive produced by Simon Cowell, reached the top 20, ultimately peaking at number 14. This chart success gave the record a slot on BBC One's Top of the Pops, with Wilmot featuring in the clip used for the video breakers on the programme originally broadcast on 12 December 1991, but Gary Martin appearing as the vocalist instead of Wilmot, in the studio a week later.

In 2004, Wilmot embarked on his own national concert tour, My Kind of Music, taking him to concert venues throughout the country.

== Stage credits ==
=== Theatre ===
==== As actor ====
Year	Title	Role	Director	Theatre
1989–91	Me and My Girl	Bill Snibson	Mike Ockrent	Adelphi Theatre, London
1991	Carmen Jones	Joe		The Old Vic, London
1991	Teething Troubles			UK tour
1993	Me and My Girl	Bill Snibson	Mike Ockrent	UK tour
1994	Copacabana	Stephen / Tony	Roger Redfarn	Theatre Royal, Plymouth and Prince of Wales Theatre
1995	Me and My Girl	Bill Snibson	Mike Ockrent	UK tour
1997–98	The Goodbye Girl	Elliot Garfield		Albery Theatre, London and UK tour
1998–99	Oliver!	Fagin	Sam Mendes	UK tour
1999–2000	One for the Road			Bristol Old Vic and UK tour
2001	Confusions			UK tour
2001	A Midsummer Night's Dream	Bottom	Alan Strachan	Regents Park Open Air Theatre
2001	Pirates of Penzance	The Pirate King		Regents Park Open Air Theatre
2002	Travels with my Aunt	Henry		UK tour
2003–04	Chitty Chitty Bang Bang	Caracticus Potts	Adrian Noble	London Palladium
2004–05	Cinderella	Buttons		Grand Theatre, Wolverhampton
2005	HMS Pinafore	Dick Deadeye	Ian Talbot	Regents Park Open Air Theatre
2005–06	Santa Claus the Musical	Joe the Elf		Mayflower Theatre, Southampton
2006	Chitty Chitty Bang Bang	Caracticus Potts	Adrian Noble	Birmingham Hippodrome
2006–07	Peter Pan	Captain Hook		Grimsby Auditorium
2007–08	Half a Sixpence	Arthur Kipps		UK tour
2007–08	The Wizard of Oz	Hunk / The Scarecrow		Mayflower Theatre, Southampton
2008	The Wizard of Oz	Zeke / The Cowardly Lion		Royal Festival Hall
2009	Chicago	Billy Flynn		UK tour
2010	Lord Arthur Savile's Crime	Septimus Podgers		UK tour
2010–11	The Invisible Man	Thomas Marvel		Menier Chocolate Factory
2011	Radio Times	Sammy Shaw		Watermill Theatre
2011–12	Cinderella	Buttons		Richmond Theatre
2012	Radio Times	Sammy Shaw		UK tour
2012	Bowl of Cherries	Various		Charing Cross Theatre
2013–14	Snow White	Nora Crumble	Michael Harrison	Birmingham Hippodrome
2014	The Pajama Game	Vernon Hines		Shaftesbury Theatre, London
2014	Dirty Rotten Scoundrels	Andre	Jerry Mitchell	Savoy Theatre, London
2014–15	Jack and the Beanstalk	Dame Trot	Michael Harrison	Birmingham Hippodrome
2015	Oklahoma!	Ali Hakim	Rachel Kavanagh	UK tour
2015	Dirty Rotten Scoundrels	Andre	Jerry Mitchell	UK tour
2015–16	Aladdin	Widow Twankey		Milton Keynes Theatre
2017	The Wind in the Willows	Badger	Rachel Kavanagh	London Palladium
2016	End of the Rainbow	Anthony		UK tour
2016	Big The Musical	George McMillan		Theatre Royal, Plymouth
2017–2018	Dick Whittington	Sarah the Cook	Michael Harrison	London Palladium
2018	Flowers for Mrs Harris	Major / Monsieur Armande	Daniel Evans	Chichester Festival Theatre
2018–2019	Snow White	Mrs Crumble	Michael Harrison	London Palladium
2019	Little Miss Sunshine	Grandpa	Mehmet Ergen	Arcola Theatre
2019	Mr Gum and the Dancing Bear	Jonathan Ripples	Amy Hodge	Dorfman Theatre, National Theatre
2019–20	Goldilocks and the Three Bears	Dame Betty Barnum	Michael Harrison	London Palladium
2020	The Prince of Egypt	Jethro	Scott Schwartz	Dominion Theatre
2020	Pantoland at the Palladium	Dame	Michael Harrison	London Palladium
2021	Anything Goes	Elisha Whitney	Kathleen Marshall	Barbican Theatre, London
2021–22	Pantoland at the Palladium	Dame	Michael Harrison	London Palladium
2022	Wicked	The Wizard of Oz		Apollo Victoria Theatre
2022–23	Jack and the Beanstalk	Queen Nigella	Michael Harrison	London Palladium
2024	The Wizard of Oz	The Wizard of Oz / Professor Marvel	Nikolai Foster	London Palladium
2023–24	Peter Pan	Mrs Henrietta Hook	Michael Harrison	London Palladium
2024	The Wizard of Oz	The Wizard of Oz / Professor Marvel	Nikolai Foster	UK and Ireland tour
2024	The Artist	Al Zimmer	Drew McOnie	Theatre Royal, Plymouth
2024	Something Rotten! In Concert	Nostradamus	Tim Jackson	Theatre Royal Drury Lane
2024	Robin Hood	King Richard (Guest Star)	Michael Harrison	London Palladium
2025	A Man For All Seasons	The Common Man	Jonathan Church	UK tour and Harold Pinter Theatre
2025	Inside No. 9 Stage/Fright	Guest Star (10 October)	Simon Evans	The Alexandra, Birmingham
2026	While They Were Waiting	Bicks	Sydney Stevenson	Upstairs at the Gatehouse
2026	Cats	Gus	Drew McOnie	Regent's Park Open Air Theatre
2026	As You Like It	Duke Frederick / Duke Senior	Daniel Evans	Royal Shakespeare Theatre (Royal Shakespeare Company)

==== As writer/director ====
- Sweet Lorraine (2018 - writer and director)
- While They Were Waiting (2026 - writer)

== Filmography ==
=== Television ===
Year	Title	Role	Channel / Production	Notes
1970s	New Faces	Himself		
1983–85	So you want to be Top	Presenter	BBC	
1983	Chas & Dave's Knees-Up		LWT	
1984	Mike Reid's Mates and Music	Himself	ITV	
1984	You and Me	Presenter	BBC	
1985	The Bob Monkhouse Show	Himself	BBC	
1985–86	Copy Cats	Himself	LWT	
1985	The Keith Harris Show	Himself	BBC	
1985	Blankety Blank Christmas Special	Himself	BBC	
1986	Saturday Gang	Himself	LWT	Writer
1986	This is Your Life	Himself	ITV	
1987	Aspel & Company	Himself	LWT	
1987–88	Cue Gary	Himself	ITV	Writer
1988	Disney Time	Presenter		
1989	The Book Tower	Presenter	Yorkshire Television	
1989	Fun with Numbers	Presenter	Carlton Home Entertainment	VHS only
1992–93	Junglies	Various Characters (Voice)	ITV	
1994–95	Showstoppers	Presenter	BBC	
1999	Hetty Wainthropp Investigates	Guest Appearance	BBC	Comic Relief Special
2001	An Audience with Des O'Connor	Himself	LWT	
2003	Never Mind the Buzzcocks	Himself	BBC	Series 13, Episode 8
2017	The Keith & Paddy Picture Show	Winston Zeddmore	BBC	Series 1, Episode 2: 'Ghostbusters'
2020	Dr Seuss' The Grinch Musical!	Grandpa Who	NBC	
2020	Jane McDonald and friends	Himself	Channel 5	
2021	Fireman Sam	Trevor Evans	Cartoonito	
2025	Midsomer Murders	Rufus Coulter	ITV	Series 25, Episode: "Treasures of Darkness"
2026	Would I Lie to You?	Himself	BBC	Series 19, Episode 3
2026	Death in Paradise	Anton Busette	BBC	Series 15, Episodes 2 & 7

=== Film ===
Year	Title	Role	Notes
1985	Lollipop Dragon: The Great Christmas Race	Lollipop Dragon / Hairy Troll (Voice)	Television film
1986	Lollipop Dragon: The Magic Lollipop Adventure	Lollipop Dragon (Voice)	Television film
1994–95	Lazarus		
1997	The Tony Ferrino Phenomenon	Himself	Television film
2026	Frank and Percy †		Post-production
