= The Undertaker (2023 British film) =

British thriller film

- Film poster
- Directed by: Michael Wright
- Screenplay by: Michael Wright
- Produced by: Michael Wright; Ben Hughes; Roger Barclay; Kate Terence; Tom George; Bob Cryer
- Starring: Paul McGann; Tara Fitzgerald; Murray Melvin; Roger Barclay; Ray Emmet Brown
- Cinematography: Luke Fleming
- Edited by: Nicholas Fielden
- Music by: Tess Tyler
- Production company: Susceptor Films Ltd.
- Distributed by: DC Releasing
- Release dates: 3 November 2023 (premier); 12 February 2024 (internet)
- Running time: 89 minutes
- Country: United Kingdom
- Language: English

The Undertaker is a 2023 British thriller film written and directed by Michael Wright. The film stars Paul McGann as Arthur, Tara Fitzgerald as Vic and Murray Melvin as Lenny. The film is a dark thriller blending mythic themes of loyalty and revenge, good and evil as it explores the fragile, shadowy boundary between life and death.

== Plot ==
In a small town in Northern England sometime in the 1960s, an undertaker is caught in a life and death moral dilemma, as he is coerced into disposing of the victims of a local gangster's murderous power grab. Arthur Morel's life has been dedicated to ushering the deceased from the world of the living to the world of the dead, so when local gangster Finlay Unsworth makes Arthur an offer he can't refuse, Arthur believes he can handle the situation. With retirement on the horizon, Arthur thinks he can just look the other way and take the money.

But as Finlay's killing spree spirals out of control, Arthur realises he is in well out of his depth; in fact he is drowning. Realising he knows too much and that he will be the next one in a body bag, his only option is to turn amateur vigilante and attempt to end the brutal reign of terror. As Arthur is forced to face his own demons and confront Finlay, the small town murderous monster, he knows that the funerals are not over and that he is now heading to his own.

== Production and release ==
The Undertaker was shot at Bristol's Bottle Yard Studios over a period of 23 days and premiered in Bristol on 3 November 2023.

== Reception ==
The Undertaker received mixed reviews, and no box office data is available.

== Accolades ==
Year	Ceremony	Category	Nominee	Result
2024	Belize International Film Festival	Best Feature	The Undertaker	Won
2024	UK Film Festival	Best Feature	The Undertaker	Won
2024	Marbella International Film Festival	Best Feature	The Undertaker	Won
