= So You Want to Be Top? =

- Genre: Children's Game show
- Created by: John Langdon; Ian White
- Presented by: Gary Wilmot
- Starring: Kate Copstick; Bill Homewood (series 1); The Gemini Twins (scorers - series 1); Leni Harper (series 2 and 3)
- Country of origin: United Kingdom
- Original language: English
- No. of series: 3
- No. of episodes: 18

Production
- Running time: 15 minutes

Original release
- Network: BBC1
- Release: 7 November 1983 – 17 December 1985

So You Want to Be Top? is a British children's game show that aired on BBC1 from 7 November 1983 to 17 December 1985 and is presented by Gary Wilmot.

== Transmissions ==
Series	Start date	End date	Episodes
1	7 November 1983	12 December 1983	6
2	13 November 1984	18 December 1984	6
3	12 November 1985	17 December 1985	6
