= Steve Coogan =

British actor and comedian (born 1965)

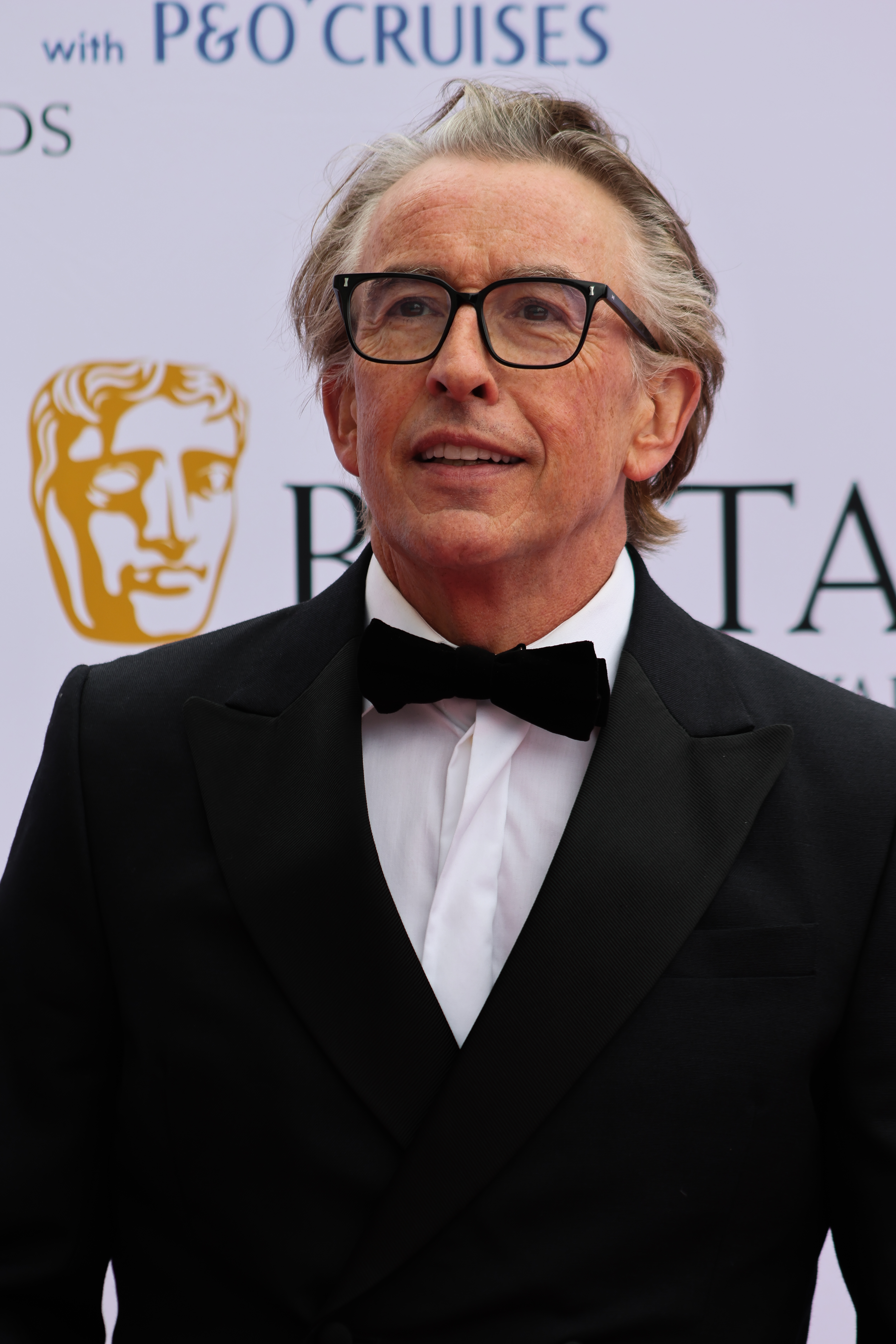
- Coogan in 2026
- Born: Stephen John Coogan; 14 October 1965 (age 61); Middleton, Lancashire, England
- Citizenship: United Kingdom; Ireland
- Education: Manchester Metropolitan University (BA)
- Occupations: Actor; comedian; screenwriter; producer
- Years active: 1988–present
- Title: Co-founder and creative director of Baby Cow Productions
- Spouse: Caroline Hickman (m. 2002; div. 2005)
- Partner: Anna Cole (1992–1996)
- Children: 1
- Relatives: Brendan Coogan (brother); Martin Coogan (brother); Aidan McArdle (cousin)
- Coogan's voice from the BBC programme Desert Island Discs, 11 October 2009

Stephen John Coogan (/ˈkuːɡən/; born 14 October 1965) is a British actor, comedian, screenwriter and producer. His accolades include six BAFTA Awards and nominations for two Academy Awards and a Golden Globe Award. He is best known for his character Alan Partridge, a socially inept and politically incorrect media personality, which he developed while working with On the Hour (1991–1992) and The Day Today (1994). The role has been featured in numerous projects such as I'm Alan Partridge (1997–2002) and Alan Partridge: Alpha Papa (2013).

Coogan began his career as a voice actor on the satirical puppet show Spitting Image (1988–1992). He grew in prominence in the film industry starring in The Parole Officer and 24 Hour Party People (both 2002) before acting in films such as Around the World in 80 Days (2004), the Night at the Museum trilogy (2006–2014), Tropic Thunder (2008), The Other Guys (2010), Percy Jackson & the Olympians: The Lightning Thief (2010), Ruby Sparks (2012), and Greed (2019). He co-starred as himself with Rob Brydon in A Cock and Bull Story (2005) and the BBC series The Trip (2010), The Trip to Italy (2014), The Trip to Spain (2017), and The Trip to Greece (2020), all of which were also re-edited into films. He played the part of former undercover agent Don in the Netflix limited series Legends (2026).

In 1999, Coogan co-founded the production company Baby Cow Productions with Henry Normal. In 2013, he co-wrote, produced, and starred in the film Philomena, which earned him Academy Awards nominations for Best Adapted Screenplay and Best Picture. Coogan has also played dramatic roles, including Marie Antoinette (2006), What Maisie Knew (2012), The Look of Love (2013) and The Dinner (2017). He portrayed Stan Laurel in Stan & Ollie (2018) and Jimmy Savile in the BBC drama The Reckoning (2023), both of which earned him BAFTA Award nominations.

== Early life ==
Stephen John Coogan was born on 14 October 1965 in Middleton, Lancashire, the son of housewife Kathleen (née Coonan) and IBM engineer Anthony "Tony" Coogan. He has four brothers and one sister, and was raised Roman Catholic in what he described as a "lower middle-class or upper working-class" family which emphasised the values of education. His elder brother Martin is a musician, while his younger brother Brendan is a presenter. Coogan's mother was born in England and grew up in County Mayo, and his father was born in Manchester to Irish parents Margaret (from County Kilkenny) and Thomas Coogan (a tailor from County Cork), who had settled there shortly before the First World War. In the 1950s, his paternal grandfather established a dance hall for Irish immigrants. Coogan has stated that he had a happy childhood, and his parents fostered children on a short-term basis.

Coogan lived on Manchester New Road in Alkrington. His father stood for the SDP-Liberal Alliance in the Middleton South ward at the Rochdale Borough Council elections in both May 1983 and May 1984. He was also chairman of the Catholic Grammar Schools Parents Association, and protested against the proposal by the Salford Roman Catholic Diocesan Schools Commission to close the sixth form (which ultimately did not happen). Coogan attended St. Thomas More Roman Catholic Primary School and Cardinal Langley Roman Catholic High School. Coogan passed two O-levels in 1983, which were likely re-take exams, aged 17. In 1984 he gained 4 A-levels: English Literature, British Government and Politics, Art, and General Studies. In the same year, his brother Kevin acquired nine O-levels at the same school and took part in local and regional sports competitions, notably in basketball and cross country running.

Coogan's sister trained to be a teacher at the nearby Hopwood Hall College. As a family, it was assumed that all the children would become teachers. Coogan had a talent for impersonation and wanted to go to drama school, despite being advised by a teacher that it could lead to a precarious profession. After five failed applications to various drama schools in London, he received a place at the theatre company New Music before gaining a place at the Manchester Polytechnic School of Drama, where he met future collaborator John Thomson.

== Career ==
=== 1989–2002: Breakthrough as Alan Partridge ===
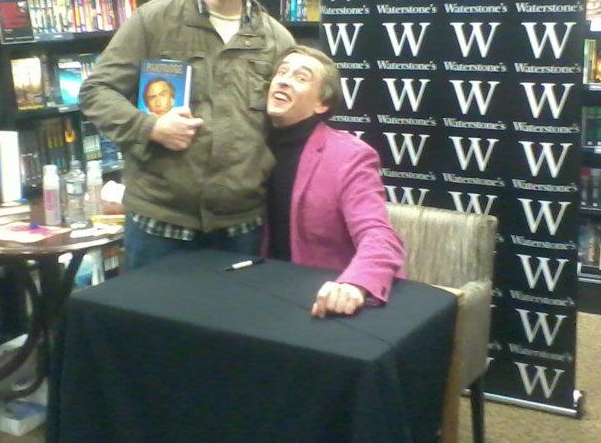
Coogan in character as Alan Partridge signing copies of the spoof autobiography I, Partridge: We Need to Talk About Alan

Coogan began his career as a comic and impressionist, performing regularly in Ipswich, before working as a voice artist for television advertisements and the satirical puppet show Spitting Image. In 1988, he provided vocals for the acid house record 'Don't Believe the Hype' credited to Mista E. The record peaked at number 41 in December 1988, narrowly missing the main chart rundown. In 1989, he appeared in a series of specially shot sketches in the Observation round in the long-running ITV game show The Krypton Factor.

In 1992, Coogan won the Perrier Award at the Edinburgh Festival Fringe for his performance with long-time collaborator John Thomson, and starred alongside him and Caroline Aherne in a one-off Granada TV sketch show, The Dead Good Show. His most prominent characters developed at this time were Paul Calf, a stereotypical working-class Mancunian, and his sister Pauline, played by Coogan in drag.

While working on the Radio 4 comedy On the Hour, Coogan created Alan Partridge, a parody of British sports presenters, with the producer Armando Iannucci. Coogan described Partridge as a Little Englander, with right-wing values and poor taste. He is socially inept, often offending his guests, and has an inflated sense of importance and celebrity. According to Coogan, Partridge was originally a "one-note, sketchy character" and "freak show", but slowly became refined as a dysfunctional alter ego.

In 1992, Partridge hosted a spin-off Radio 4 spoof chat show, Knowing Me, Knowing You with Alan Partridge. On the Hour transferred to television as The Day Today in 1994, followed by Knowing Me, Knowing You later that year. In 1997, Coogan starred as Partridge in a BBC sitcom, I'm Alan Partridge, written by Coogan, Iannucci and Peter Baynham, following Partridge's life in a roadside hotel working for a small radio station. It earned two BAFTAs and was followed by a second series in 2002.

After I'm Alan Partridge, Coogan got tired of Partridge and limited him to smaller roles. Coogan said he did not want to say goodbye to Partridge, and that "as long as I can do my other things, that, to me, is the perfect balance". He later said that Partridge had once been an "albatross" but had become "a battered, comfortable old leather jacket". Critics have praised Partridge's complexity, realism and pathos. Vanity Fair called him a British national treasure and the Guardian described him as "one of the greatest and most beloved comic creations of the last few decades". Partridge is credited with influencing cringe comedies such as The Inbetweeners, Nighty Night and Peep Show. In 2001 a poll by Channel 4, Partridge was voted seventh on their list of the 100 Greatest TV Characters.

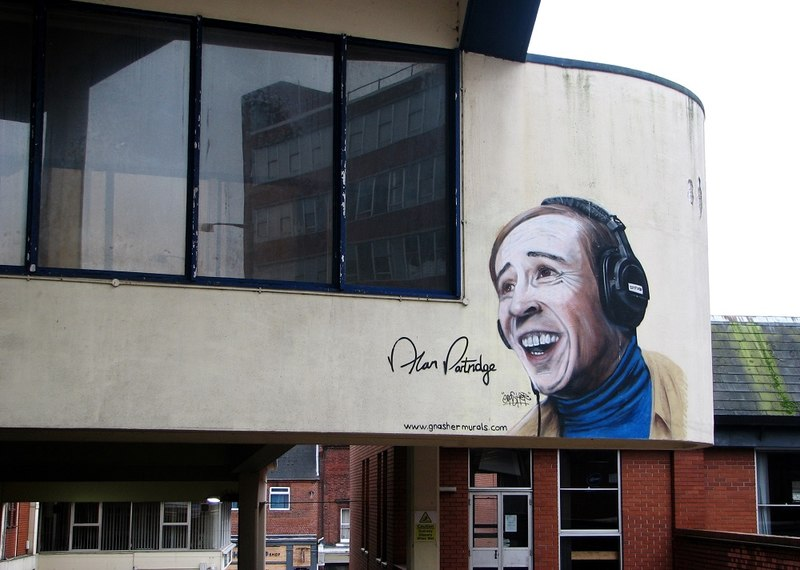
Partridge at the Hollywood Cinema

Paul Calf began as a character named 'Duncan Disorderly' in Coogan's early stand-up routines. Calf first came to wider public notice in 1993, with several appearances on Saturday Zoo, a late-night variety show presented by Jonathan Ross on Channel 4. Paul has appeared in two video diaries, an episode of Coogan's Run, and in various stand-up performances. He is an unemployed Mancunian wastrel with a particular hatred of students. His catchphrase, spoken to disparage something or someone, is "Bag o' shite". Paul lives in a council house in the fictional town of Ottle with his mother and his sister, Pauline Calf (also played by Coogan). His father, Pete Calf (played by Coogan in Coogan's Run) died some time before the first video diary was made. For a long time he was obsessed with getting back together with his ex-girlfriend, Julie. Paul's best friend is "Fat" Bob (played by John Thomson), a car mechanic who eventually married Pauline. Paul supports Manchester City and is very partial to Wagon Wheels. He wears Burton suits, sports a bleached mullet hairstyle, and drives a Ford Cortina. Pauline Calf's Wedding Video won the 1995 BAFTA Television Award for Best Comedy.

Other Coogan creations include Tommy Saxondale, Duncan Thicket, Ernest Eckler and Portuguese Eurovision Song Contest winner Tony Ferrino. Duncan Thicket has appeared in a tour of live shows. Coogan, along with his writing partner Henry Normal, founded Baby Cow Productions in 1999. Together, they have served as executive producers for shows such as The Mighty Boosh, Nighty Night, Marion and Geoff, Gavin & Stacey, Human Remains and Moone Boy, as well as the Alan Partridge feature film Alan Partridge: Alpha Papa. They have also produced Where Are the Joneses?, an online sitcom which uses wiki technology to allow the audience to upload scripts and storyline ideas.

Other TV shows he has starred in include Coogan's Run, Dr. Terrible's House of Horrible, Monkey Trousers and Saxondale. Coogan has provided voices for the animated series I Am Not an Animal and Bob and Margaret, two Christmas specials featuring Robbie the Reindeer, and an episode of the BBC Radio Four spoof sci-fi series Nebulous. He played the Gnat in the 1998 TV adaptation of Alice Through the Looking-Glass starring Kate Beckinsale.

=== 2003–2009: Film roles and standup ===
Coogan starred in BBC2's The Private Life of Samuel Pepys in 2003, and Cruise of the Gods in 2002 and portrayed Factory Records boss, Tony Wilson in the film, 24 Hour Party People (2002). In 2006, he had a cameo in the Little Britain Christmas special as a pilot taking Lou and Andy to Disneyland. Coogan has played himself several times on screen. First, in one of the vignettes of Jim Jarmusch's 2003 film Coffee and Cigarettes, alongside Alfred Molina. Second, in 2006 Coogan starred with Rob Brydon in Michael Winterbottom's A Cock and Bull Story, a self-referential film of the "unfilmable" self-referential novel Tristram Shandy by Laurence Sterne. In the film, Coogan plays a fictional, womanising version of himself.

The first film that Coogan co-wrote with Henry Normal was The Parole Officer, in which he also acted alongside Ben Miller and Lena Headey. He has an uncredited cameo in Hot Fuzz, scripted by Shaun of the Dead writers Simon Pegg and Edgar Wright. He also starred in the Night at the Museum trilogy in which he played Octavius, a miniature Roman general figure, alongside Owen Wilson's Jedediah, a miniature cowboy figure. In 2007, Coogan played a psychiatrist on Larry David's Curb Your Enthusiasm on HBO, and in 2008, starred in the BBC1 drama Sunshine.

In March 2008, it was confirmed that Coogan would return to doing comedy as part of his first stand-up tour in ten years. The tour, named "Steve Coogan as Alan Partridge and other less successful characters", saw the return of some of his old characters including Paul Calf and Alan Partridge. Reviews of the tour were mixed. Much of the criticism focused on the apparent unrehearsed quality of some of the performances and on Coogan's nervous stage presence. Chortle comedy guide described it as "most definitely a show of two halves: the superlative Alan Partridge plus a collection of characters that are not only less successful, but woefully less funny".

As the tour progressed and the problems were ironed out, reviews were very positive. Dominic Maxwell of The Times described the show as "twice as entertaining as most other comedy shows this year". Brian Logan of The Guardian awarded it four stars and described it as "shamelessly funny". Reviews such as the one from the Trent FM Arena exemplified how much the show had improved after dealing with the glitches on its first few dates: "When Steve Coogan first brought this show to Nottingham last month, the reviews were poor... the intervening weeks have made a big difference, and last night's audience at the Trent FM Arena went home happy. More please, and soon."

In 2008, BBC Worldwide bought a 25% stake in the production company. It did not offer the largest sum, but was chosen by Coogan and Normal owing to their previous work with and strong connection with the BBC. In 2009, Coogan was featured, alongside Vic Reeves, Bob Mortimer and Julia Davis, in the spoof documentary TV film Steve Coogan – The Inside Story. The same year he spoke on the influence of Monty Python on his comedy when he appeared in the television documentary, Monty Python: Almost the Truth (Lawyers Cut).

=== 2010–2019: The Trip and Philomena ===
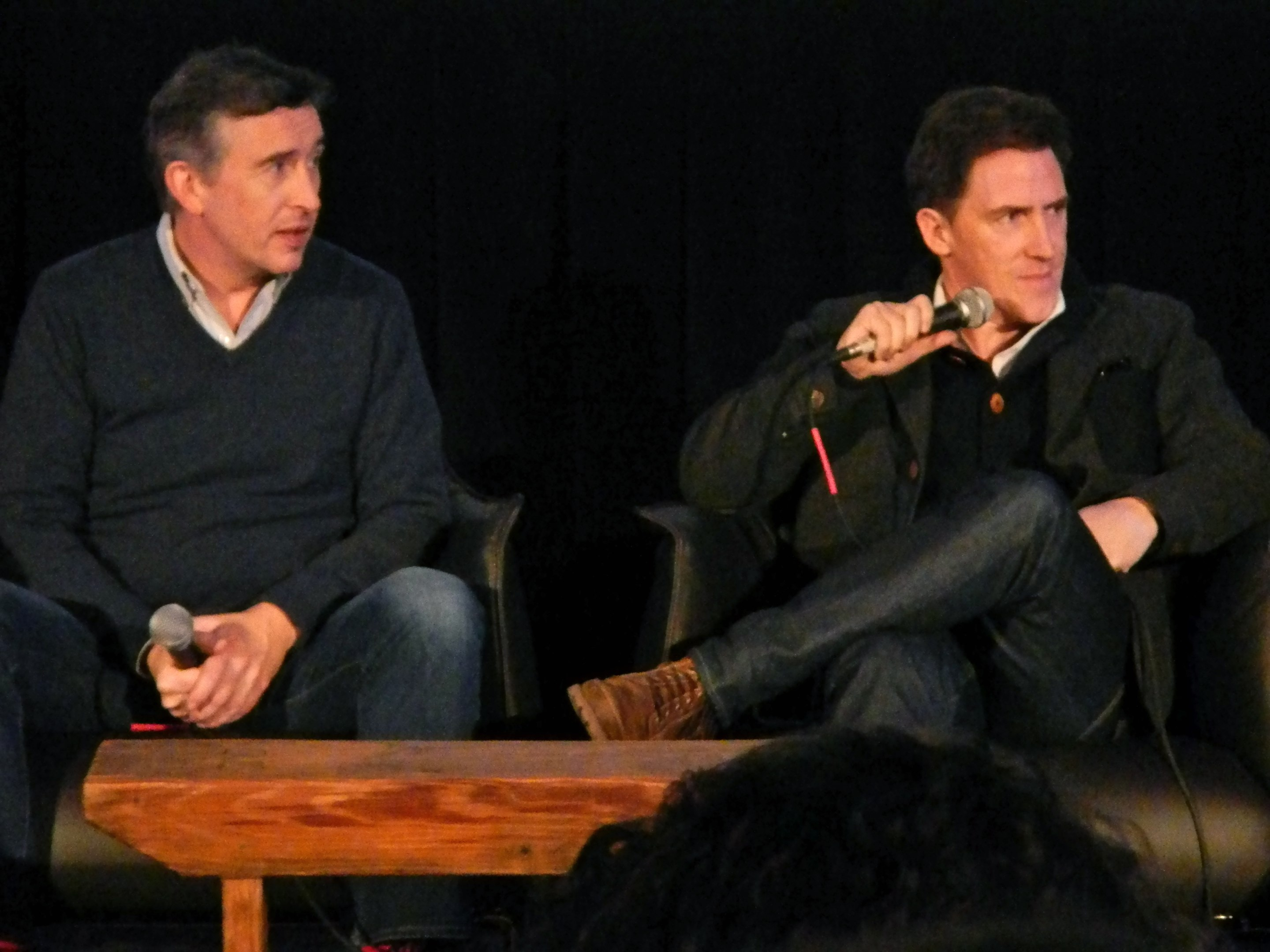
Coogan (left) and Rob Brydon at the 2014 Sundance Film Festival

In 2010, he worked again with Brydon and Michael Winterbottom for the partially improvised BBC2 sitcom The Trip, in which he and Brydon tour northern restaurants. The movie was followed in 2014 with the film, The Trip to Italy, about him and Brydon taking a food-tasting trip through Italy, followed by The Trip to Spain (2017) and The Trip to Greece (2020). He worked again with director Winterbottom in The Look of Love (2013), about '50s porn-king, Paul Raymond. Partridge returned in 2010 with a series of shorts, Mid Morning Matters with Alan Partridge, written with new writers Rob and Neil Gibbons. It was followed by the spoof memoirs I, Partridge: We Need to Talk About Alan (2011) and Nomad (2016), the feature film Alan Partridge: Alpha Papa (2013), and several TV specials. In his autobiography, Coogan wrote that Alpha Papa was the hardest he had ever worked and that the production was fraught; however, he was proud of the finished film.

Coogan produced, co-wrote and co-starred in the drama film Philomena (2013). He portrayed the real-life journalist Martin Sixsmith, who helps a former resident of an Irish Roman Catholic mother and baby home, Philomena Lee, played by Judi Dench, find her son after decades long absence. The film received acclaim and was a financial success. The Variety critic Justin Chang wrote, "The two leads make decent sparring partners and better allies, and Coogan is especially good whenever Martin's impatient manner tilts into genuine moral indignation." Coogan received the BAFTA Award for Best Adapted Screenplay and the Venice Film Festival Award for Best Screenplay as well as nominations for the Academy Award for Best Adapted Screenplay and the Golden Globe Award for Best Screenplay. The film earned four Academy Award nominations including for Best Picture losing to Steve McQueen's historical drama 12 Years a Slave (2013). Coogan's autobiography, Easily Distracted, was published in October 2015.

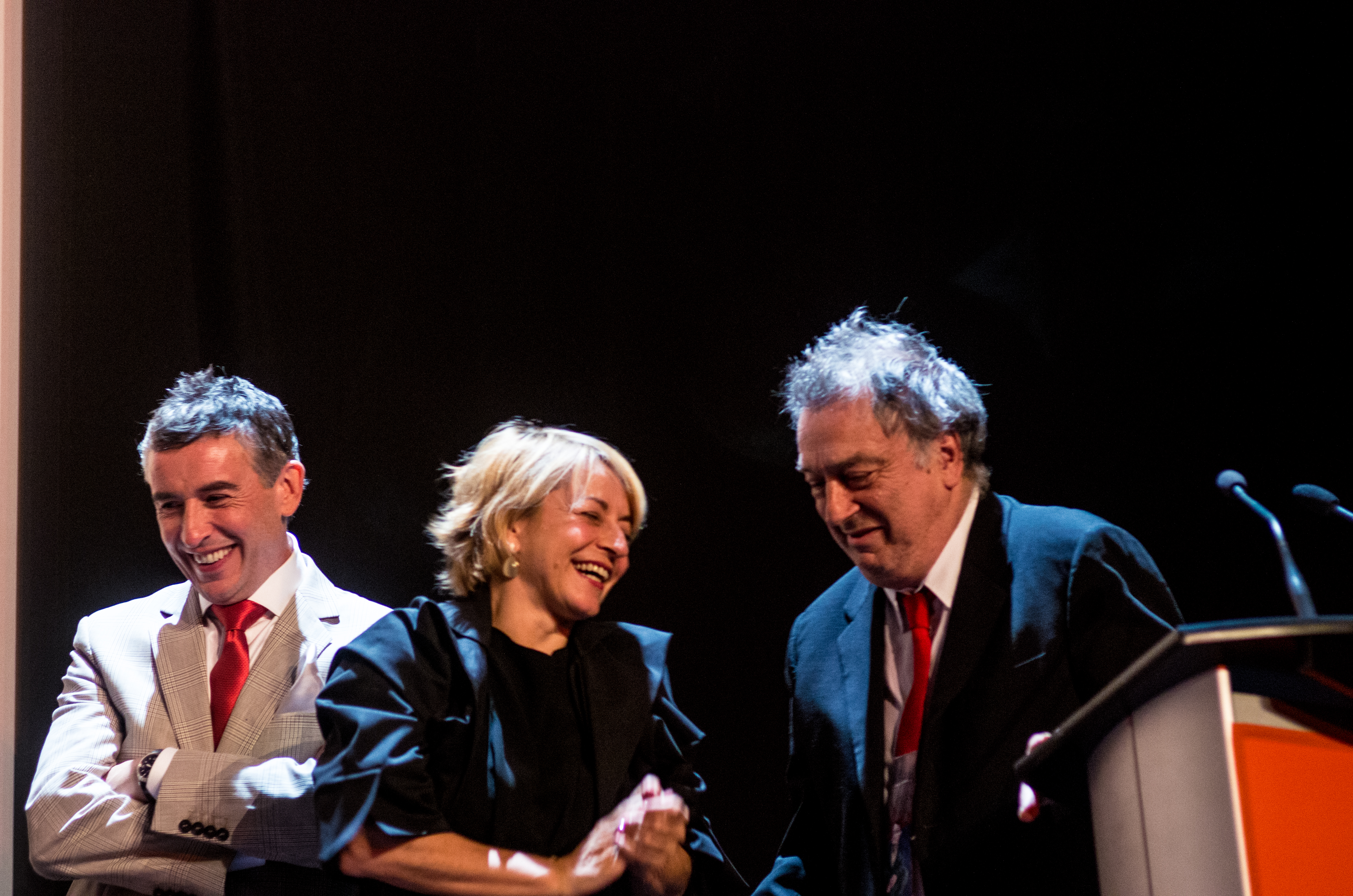
Coogan (left) with Stephen Frears at a screening for Philomena in 2013

In 2016, after Henry Normal stood down, Christine Langan (head of BBC Film at the time) was hired by Coogan (creative director of Baby Cow Productions) as the new CEO; this led to BBC Worldwide increasing its stake to 73%. Since joining, Langan has executive-produced all of the content from Baby Cow Productions, including Camping, Stan & Ollie, Zapped and The Witchfinder. Coogan played the comedian Stan Laurel in the 2018 biographical film Stan & Ollie, alongside the American actor John C. Reilly, who played Oliver Hardy. Todd McCarthy of The Hollywood Reporter wrote that Coogan "slips neatly into the role" and added, "Coogan and Reilly not only excel at creating convincing impressions of one of the most famous comic teams of the last century, but they do an uncanny job of recreating a handful of their famous routines, which today mostly play as mild yet expertly timed delights."

For his performance, he earned a nomination for the BAFTA Award for Best Actor in a Leading Role. In 2019, Partridge returned to the BBC with This Time with Alan Partridge, a spoof of magazine shows such as The One Show, followed by an Audible podcast, From the Oasthouse, in 2020. The podcast has now run for three seasons, including a free teaser episode where Partridge commented on the coronation of Charles III and Camilla.

=== 2020–present ===
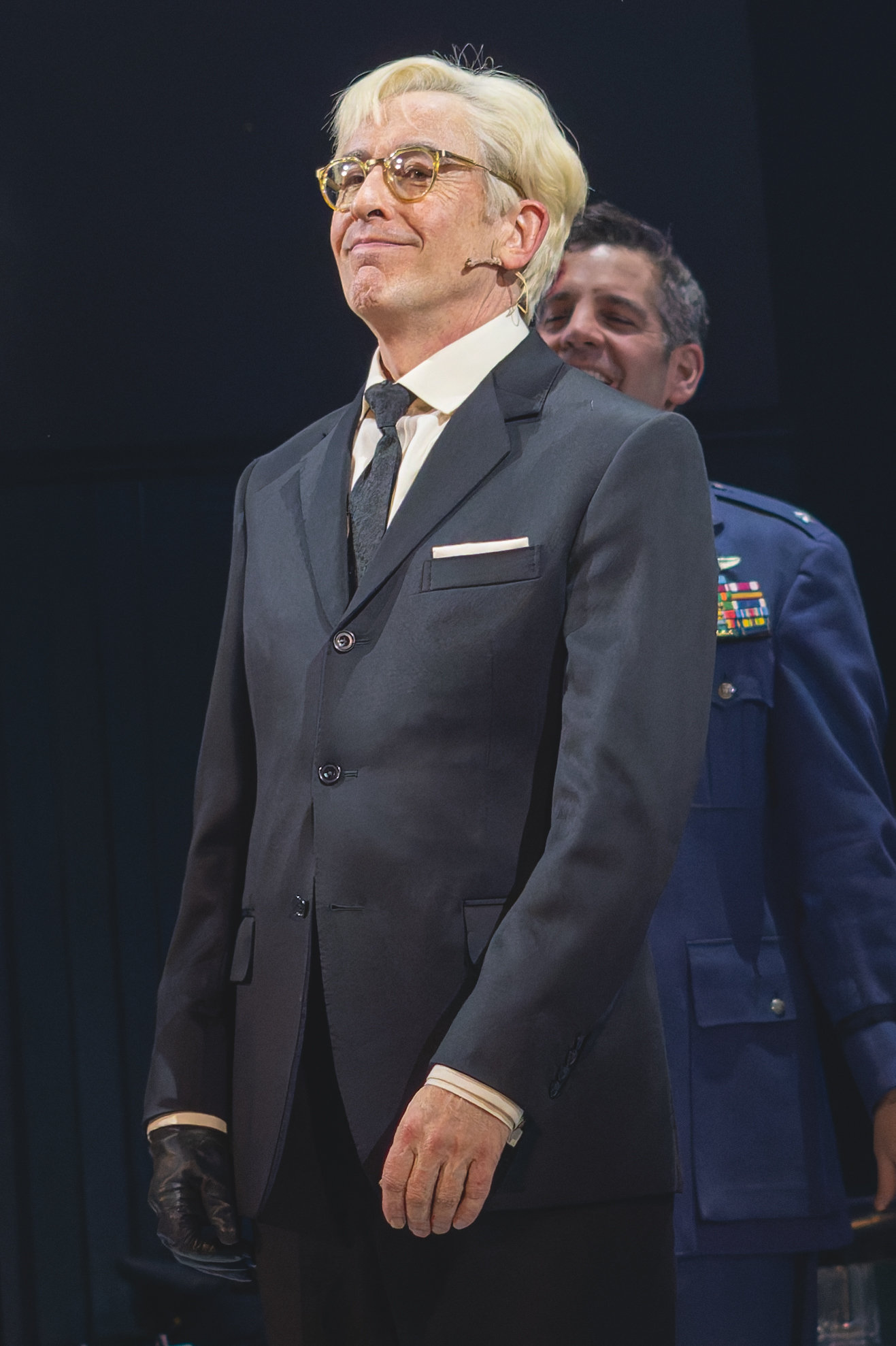
Coogan performing as Dr. Strangelove in 2024

In April 2022, Coogan began an Alan Partridge tour, Stratagem. Reviewing the show for the Guardian, Brian Logan noted that though Coogan had once tired of Partridge, he now "clearly takes pleasure in the performance". Coogan starred in the 2022 film The Lost King, playing the husband of the writer Philippa Langley, who discovered the bones of King Richard III.

Coogan played Jimmy Savile in the BBC One series The Reckoning (2023). Coogan said the decision to play Savile was "not one I took lightly", and that the script "tackled a horrific story which – however harrowing – needs to be told". Despite the controversy surrounding the series, Coogan's performance was mostly praised by critics, and he was nominated for the British Academy Television Award for Best Actor. Coogan appeared in the 2024 film Joker: Folie à Deux as Paddy Meyers, a TV personality who interviews the Joker.

Filming for the next Partridge project, Alan Partridge: How Are You?, began in early 2024. Coogan stars in multiple roles in a London stage version of the 1964 film Dr. Strangelove, adapted by Iannucci. The play opened at the Noël Coward Theatre on 8 October 2024.

In March 2025, it was announced that Coogan had joined the cast of Legends, a Netflix drama series inspired by the true story of British Customs employees sent undercover to infiltrate drug gangs. His performance was widely hailed as a career best for Coogan.

== In the media ==
=== Public image ===
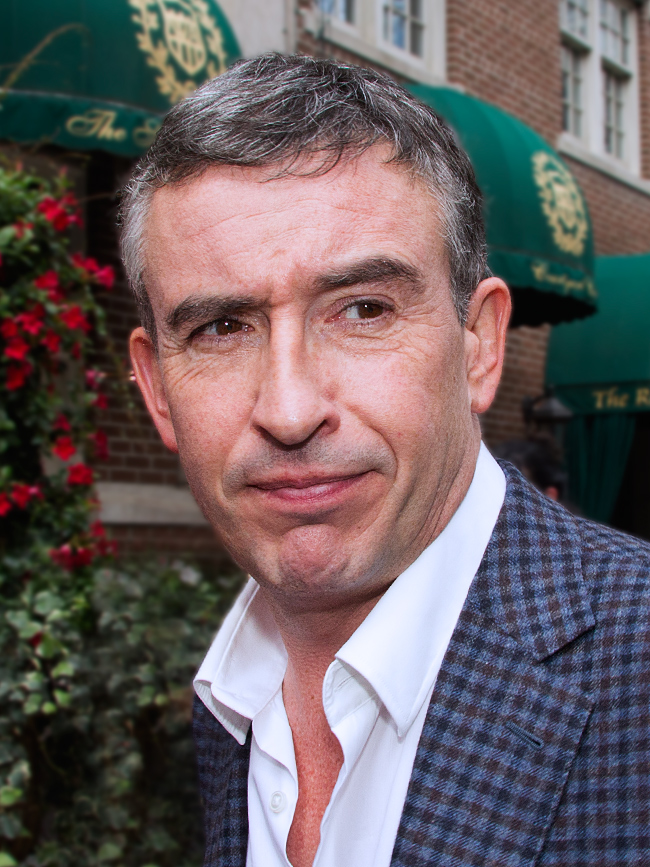
Coogan at the 2013 Toronto International Film Festival

Coogan has said that he likes to "keep [himself] private", and added: "I have never wanted to be famous, as such – fame is a by-product." He has been a British tabloid fixture since as early as 1996, and has stated that such outlets have subjected him to entrapment and blackmail, printed obvious lies about him, and have targeted his family and friends in attempts to extract stories from them. Coogan in some cases strongly denied allegations, but in others did not contest them because he wanted to shield vulnerable friends from adverse publicity.

The tabloids also published intrusive information about his relationships and the schooling of his child. Coogan has also been critical of the broadsheet press, saying they have colluded with the tabloids in the interests of selling newspapers. In 2005, he said "The Guardian tends to have its cake and eat it. It waits for the tabloids to dish the dirt and then it talks about the tabloids dishing the dirt while enjoying it themselves." He later gave credit to the same newspaper for its investigation of the phone hacking scandal. He has said that the press, by persistently intruding in his private life, has effectively made him "immune" to further attack as his "closet is empty of skeletons".

=== Phone hacking scandal ===
Coogan favours reform and regulation of the British press. He became a prominent figure in the News International phone hacking scandal as one of the celebrities who took action against the British tabloids in light of these events. He was made aware by his phone service provider of "possible anomalies" on his phone in 2005 and 2006. In 2010, Coogan's legal firm obtained a partially redacted version of Glenn Mulcaire's hacking notebook by a court order which showed Coogan had been targeted and his personal information was in the possession of Mulcaire.

Mulcaire was forced by the High Court of Justice to disclose to Coogan's legal team who amongst the staff at the News of the World ordered him to hack phones. This information was obtained by Coogan's lawyers on 26 August 2011. Interviewed on Newsnight on 8 July 2011, Coogan said he was "delighted" by the closure of the News of the World and said it was a "fantastic day for journalism". He said the idea of press freedom was used by the tabloids as a "smokescreen for selling papers with tittle-tattle" and said the argument against press regulation was "morally bankrupt".

Coogan provided an eight-page witness statement to the Leveson Inquiry, and appeared at the inquiry on 22 November 2011 to discuss the evidence. He said he was there reluctantly representing a lot of celebrities who felt they could not speak out for fear of reprisals from the tabloid press.

In March 2021, Coogan said "the tabloid press is controlled by a handful of tax shy billionaires with an agenda. Anyone who stands up to the press is attacked by them because they're bullies." He added "the fact that Meghan Markle and Harry were attacked has nothing to do with jet-setting hypocrisy. It's because they broke the golden rule, which is to leave us alone and we'll go easy on you next time."

== Personal life ==
In 1993, Coogan was living in Didsbury. He later lived in the manor house Ovingdean Grange in Ovingdean, East Sussex, until 2017, when it was advertised for sale at £3.25 million. As of 2022, Coogan has lived in Barcombe, in the Lewes District of East Sussex.

Coogan married Caroline Hickman in 2002 and they divorced in 2005. He dated model China Chow for three years. In March 2011, he was guest editor for the men's magazine Loaded, where he began dating the glamour model Loretta "Elle" Basey. They split in 2014. He has a daughter from a four-year relationship with the solicitor Anna Cole. Through his daughter with Cole he has a granddaughter (born 2026) whose father is Jamie Demetriou.

As of 2021, Coogan is in a relationship with model and actress Caitlin Walsh. Walsh recently appeared alongside Coogan in How Are You? It's Alan Partridge. The pair have been seen together on the red carpet and at public events.

Coogan was raised Catholic and identifies as an Irish Catholic, although he is an atheist. He described himself as "half-Irish" in an interview in 2020, and was granted an Irish passport in March 2023.

A motoring enthusiast, he has owned a number of Ferraris, but ceased after calculating that the costs exceeded those of running a private plane. In February 2016, he was fined £670 and banned from driving for 28 days after being caught speeding in Brighton. In August 2019, he escaped the usual six-month ban for a further speeding offence as his next TV series depended on his ability to drive; he was given a two-month ban and a £750 fine. He was again spared six penalty points and a six-month ban for speeding in February 2025, reduced to five points and two months as a longer ban would have prevented filming of a new series of The Trip, which would have affected the many people involved.

He has been open about his depression and past drug use.

=== Political views ===
Coogan has supported the Labour Party, the Liberal Democrats and the Green Party. He believes that the Conservative Party think "people are plebs" and that "they like to pat people on the head". In 2013, he voiced his support for abolishing the British monarchy. In August 2014, Coogan was one of 200 public figures to sign a letter to The Guardian expressing their hope that Scotland would vote to remain part of the United Kingdom in the Scottish independence referendum.

Coogan endorsed the Labour Party leader Jeremy Corbyn in the 2017 general election. He hosted a rally for Corbyn in Birmingham, saying: "The Tory tactic was to try to make this a choice between Theresa May and Jeremy Corbyn, but this has backfired as people – and I readily admit to being one of them – have started to listen to what Jeremy Corbyn says rather than what other people have been saying about him."

In November 2019, along with other public figures, Coogan signed a letter defending Corbyn, describing him as "a beacon of hope in the struggle against emergent far-right nationalism, xenophobia and racism in much of the democratic world" and endorsed him in the 2019 general election. In December 2019, along with 42 other cultural figures, Coogan signed a letter endorsing the Labour Party in the election. The letter stated that "Labour's election manifesto under Jeremy Corbyn's leadership offers a transformative plan that prioritises the needs of people and the planet over private profit and the vested interests of a few".

In September 2023, Coogan addressed the Liberal Democrat Conference by video link, expressing that he would tactically vote for the Liberal Democrats over the Labour Party in the 2024 general election, as "the candidate best placed to kick the Tories out is the Lib Dem candidate". In October, Coogan was among more than 2,000 cultural figures to sign a letter calling for a Gaza ceasefire and accused the UK government of "not only tolerating war crimes but aiding and abetting them" in the wake of the Gaza war. In June 2024, Coogan was one of more than 100 cultural figures to sign a letter calling for Labour to halt sales of arms to Israel if it is elected. That month, ahead of the general election, he endorsed the Green Party and campaigned for Siân Berry.

=== Other activities ===
In 2025, Coogan was appointed co-chair of the Middleton Mayoral development corporation by Mayor of Greater Manchester Andy Burnham, leading on regeneration of his hometown with the aim of "speeding up development and attracting investment".

== Acting credits and works ==
=== Film ===
Year	Title	Role	Notes
1989	Resurrected	Youth	
1995	The Indian in the Cupboard	Tommy Atkins	
1996	The Wind in the Willows	Mole	
1998	Sweet Revenge	Bruce Tick	
2001	The Parole Officer	Simon Garden	Also writer
2002	24 Hour Party People	Tony Wilson	
2003	Coffee and Cigarettes	Himself	Segment: "Cousins?"
2004	Ella Enchanted	Heston the Snake	Voice
2004	Around the World in 80 Days	Phileas Fogg	
2005	Happy Endings	Charley Peppitone	
2005	A Cock and Bull Story	Tristram Shandy / Walter Shandy / Steve Coogan	
2006	The Alibi	Ray Elliot	
2006	Night at the Museum	Octavius	
2006	Marie Antoinette	Ambassador Mercy	
2007	For the Love of God	Graham	Voice
2007	Hot Fuzz	Metropolitan Police Inspector	Uncredited Cameo
2008	Finding Amanda	Michael Henry	
2008	Tales of the Riverbank	Roderick	Voice
2008	Tropic Thunder	Damien Cockburn	
2008	Hamlet 2	Dana Marschz	
2009	What Goes Up	Campbell Babbitt	Also producer
2009	In the Loop	Paul Michaelson	
2009	Night at the Museum: Battle of the Smithsonian	Octavius	
2010	Percy Jackson & the Olympians: The Lightning Thief	Hades	
2010	Marmaduke	Raisin	Voice
2010	The Other Guys	David Ershon	
2011	The Trip	Steve Coogan	US film edit
2011	Our Idiot Brother	Dylan Anderson	
2012	Ruby Sparks	Langdon Tharp	
2012	What Maisie Knew	Beale	
2013	The Look of Love	Paul Raymond	
2013	Alan Partridge: Alpha Papa	Alan Partridge	Also writer
2013	Despicable Me 2	Silas Ramsbottom	Voice
2013	Philomena	Martin Sixsmith	Also writer and producer
2014	The Trip to Italy	Steve Coogan	US film edit
2014	Night at the Museum: Secret of the Tomb	Octavius	
2014	Northern Soul	Mr Banks	
2015	Minions	Professor Flux / Tower Guard	Voice
2016	Shepherds and Butchers	Johan Webber	
2016	The Secret Life of Pets	Ozone / Reginald	Voice
2016	Rules Don't Apply	Colonel Nigel Briggs	
2016	Mindhorn	Peter Eastman	Also executive producer
2017	The Dinner	Paul Lohman	
2017	Despicable Me 3	Silas Ramsbottom/Fritz	Voice
2017	The Trip to Spain	Steve Coogan	US film edit
2018	Ideal Home	Erasmus Brumble	
2018	Irreplaceable You	Mitch	
2018	The Adventures of Drunky	The Devil	Voice
2018	Hot Air	Lionel Macomb	
2018	Holmes & Watson	Gustav Klinger	Uncredited Cameo
2018	Stan & Ollie	Stan Laurel	
2019	The Professor and the Madman	Frederick James Furnivall	
2019	Greed	Sir Richard McCreadie	
2020	The Trip to Greece	Steve Coogan	US film edit
2022	Minions: The Rise of Gru	Silas Ramsbottom	Voice cameo
2022	The Lost King	John Langley	Writer and producer
2024	Despicable Me 4	Silas Ramsbottom	Voice
2024	Joker: Folie à Deux	Paddy Meyers	
2024	The Penguin Lessons	Tom Michell	
2024	From Roger Moore with Love	Narrator	Voice; documentary film
2025	Saipan	Mick McCarthy	
TBA	Love Is Not the Answer		Filming
TBA	The Adventures of Drunky	The Devil	Voice; in production

=== Television ===
Year	Title	Role	Notes
1988–92	Spitting Image	Various characters	Voice
1989	The Krypton Factor	Various characters	Specially shot sketches for the Observation round
1992	The Day Today	Alan Partridge	6 episodes
1992	The Dead Good Show	Various characters	
1993	The Smell of Reeves and Mortimer	Lead singer of Go West	Episode: "Water"
1993	Harry	Stebbings	2 episodes
1993	Saturday Zoo	Paul Calf/Pauline Calf	10 episodes
1994	The Day Today	Alan PartridgeVarious characters	Writer; 7 episodes
1994	Pauline Calf's Wedding Video	Paul Calf/Pauline Calf	Writer; Television film
1994–95	Knowing Me Knowing You with Alan Partridge	Alan Partridge	Writer; 7 episodes
1995	Coogan's Run	Various characters	Writer; 6 episodes
1996	Tales from the Crypt	Danny Skeggs	Episode: "The Kidnapper"
1997	The Tony Ferrino Phenomenon	Tony Ferrino	Television film
1997	Introducing Tony Ferrino - Who? And Why? - A Quest	Tony Ferrino	Television film
1997	The Friday Night Armistice	Alan Partridge	Episode: "The Election Night Armistice"
1997	The Fix	Mike Gabbert	Television film
1997, 2002	I'm Alan Partridge	Alan Partridge	Writer; 12 episodes
1998	Bob and Margaret	Various characters	Voice; 3 episodes
1998	Alice Through the Looking Glass	The Gnat	Television film
1999	Mrs Merton and Malcolm	Various Character	6 episodes (five as voice actor)
1999	Hooves of Fire	Blitzen	Voice; Short
2000	Human Remains	—N/a	Executive producer
2001	Combat Sheep	Commander Harris	Voice; Executive producer
2001	A Small Summer Party	Geoff	Executive producer
2001	Dr. Terrible's House of Horrible	Various characters	Writer/executive producer; 6 episodes
2002	Top Gear	Himself	Guest; Series 1, Episode 4
2002	Cruise of the Gods	Nick Lee	Executive producer
2002	Legend of the Lost Tribe	Blitzen	Voice
2003	Paul and Pauline Calf's Cheese and Ham Sandwich	Paul Calf/Pauline Calf	Writer/executive producer
2003	Anglian Lives: Alan Partridge	Alan Partridge	Writer
2003	The Private Life of Samuel Pepys	Samuel Pepys	Television film
2003–05	The Mighty Boosh	—N/a	Executive producer
2004	I Am Not An Animal	Various	Voice; Executive producer; 6 episodes
2004	Top Gear	Himself	Guest; Series 5, Episode 4
2004–05	Nighty Night	—N/a	Executive producer
2004–05	The Keith Barret Show	—N/a	Executive producer
2005	Monkey Trousers	Various	Executive producer; 5 episodes
2005	Ideal	—N/a	Executive producer
2005–07	Sensitive Skin	—N/a	Executive producer
2006	Top Gear	Himself	Guest; Series 8, Episode 7
2006	Little Britain	Pilot	Episode: "Little Britain Abroad"
2006–07	Saxondale	Tommy Saxondale	Writer and executive producer; 13 episodes
2007	Curb Your Enthusiasm	Dr. Bright	Episode: "The Therapists"
2008	Sunshine	Bob "Bing" Crosby	3 episodes
2009	Steve Coogan: The Inside Story	Himself/Various characters	Writer; Television film
2010	Neighbors from Hell	Satan	Voice; 6 episodes
2010–16	Mid Morning Matters with Alan Partridge	Alan Partridge	Writer; 24 episodes
2010–20	The Trip	Himself	24 episodes; also writer
2012	The Simpsons	Rowan Priddis (voice)	Episode: "A Totally Fun Thing That Bart Will Never Do Again"
2012	Alan Partridge on Open Books with Martin Bryce	Alan Partridge	Special; also writer and executive producer
2012	Alan Partridge: Welcome to the Places of My Life	Alan Partridge	Special; also writer and executive producer
2012	Moone Boy	Francie "Touchie" Feeley	Episode: "Bunch of Marys"; also executive producer
2013–14	Us & Them	—N/a	Executive producer
2014	The Lost Honour of Christopher Jefferies	Himself	1 episode
2015	Happyish	Thom Payne	10 episodes
2016	Zapped	Malador	2 episodes; also executive producer
2016	Alan Partridge's Scissored Isle	Alan Partridge	Special; also writer and executive producer
2017	Alan Partridge Why, When, Where, How and Whom	Himself	Television Documentary
2019–21	This Time with Alan Partridge	Alan Partridge	Writer; 12 episodes
2021	Stephen	DCI Clive Driscoll	3 episodes
2022	Chivalry	Cameron	Writer
2023	The Reckoning	Jimmy Savile	4 episodes
2024	What We Do in the Shadows	Lord Roderick Cravensworth	Episode: "Laszlo's Father"
2025	Brian and Maggie	Brian Walden	
2025	The Sandman	Barnabus (voice)	5 episodes
2025	How Are You? It's Alan (Partridge)	Alan Partridge	6 episodes
2026	Legends	Don	6 episodes

=== Stage ===
Year	Title	Role	Venue
2024–25	Dr. Strangelove	Capt. Mandrake / President Muffley / Dr. Strangelove / Maj. TJ Kong	Noël Coward Theatre, West End
2025	Dr. Strangelove	Capt. Mandrake / President Muffley / Dr. Strangelove / Maj. TJ Kong	Bord Gáis Energy Theatre, Dublin

=== Stand-up tours ===
Year	Title
1994	Live 'N' Lewd
1998	Live – The Man Who Thinks He's It
2005	Alan Partridge Presents: The Cream of British Comedy
2009	As Alan Partridge And Other Less Successful Characters – Live
2022	Alan Partridge: Stratagem

== Awards and nominations ==
Coogan's show Steve Coogan in character with John Thomson was winner of the Perrier Award for best show at the 1992 Edinburgh Fringe. He has won numerous awards for his work in TV including British Comedy Awards, BAFTAs and The South Bank Show award for comedy. In 2003, he was listed in The Observer as one of the 50 funniest acts in British comedy. In 2005, a poll to find the Comedians' Comedian saw him being voted amongst the top 20 greatest comedy acts ever by fellow comedians and comedy insiders.

Organisations	Year	Category	Work	Result	Ref.
Academy Awards	2013	Best Picture	Philomena	Nominated	
Academy Awards	2013	Best Adapted Screenplay	Philomena	Nominated	
BAFTA Film Awards	2002	Best Newcomer	The Parole Officer	Nominated	
BAFTA Film Awards	2013	Best Film	Philomena	Nominated	
BAFTA Film Awards	2013	Outstanding British Film	Philomena	Nominated	
BAFTA Film Awards	2013	Best Adapted Screenplay	Philomena	Won	
BAFTA Film Awards	2018	Best Actor in a Leading Role	Stan & Ollie	Nominated	
BAFTA TV Awards	1995	Best Light Entertainment Performance	Knowing Me Knowing You with Alan Partridge	Nominated	
BAFTA TV Awards	1995	Best Comedy Performance	Pauline Calf's Wedding Video	Nominated	
BAFTA TV Awards	1998	Best Comedy Performance	I'm Alan Partridge	align="center"	Won
BAFTA TV Awards	1998	Best Comedy (Programme or Series)	I'm Alan Partridge	Won	
BAFTA TV Awards	2003	Best Comedy Performance	I'm Alan Partridge	rowspan="1," align="center"	Nominated
BAFTA TV Awards	2011	Best Male Comedy Performance	The Trip	Won	
BAFTA TV Awards	2013	Best Male Comedy Performance	Alan Partridge	Won	
BAFTA TV Awards	2017	Best Male Comedy Performance	Alan Partridge's Scissored Isle	Won	
BAFTA TV Awards	2022	Best Male Comedy Performance	This Time with Alan Partridge	Nominated	
BAFTA TV Awards	2024	Best Actor	The Reckoning	Nominated	
BAFTA TV Awards	2026	Best Male Comedy Performance	How Are You? It's Alan (Partridge)	Won	
British Comedy Awards	1994	Best Male TV Performer	Knowing Me Knowing You with Alan Partridge	Won	
British Comedy Awards	1998	Best TV Comedy Actor	I'm Alan Partridge	Won	
British Comedy Awards	2003	Best TV Comedy Actor	Cruise of the Gods	Won	
Britannia Awards	2019	Charlie Chaplin Award – Excellence in Comedy		Won	
British Independent Film Awards	2013	Best Actor	Philomena	Nominated	
British Independent Film Awards	2013	Best Screenplay	Philomena	Nominated	
British Independent Film Awards	2018	Best Actor	Stan & Ollie	Nominated	
Critics' Choice Movie Awards	2013	Best Adapted Screenplay	Philomena	Nominated	
Dublin Film Critics' Circle	2018	Best Actor	Stan & Ollie	Nominated	
Edinburgh Comedy Awards	1992	Best Comedy Show	In Character with John Thomson	Won	
Empire Awards	2003	Best British Actor	24 Hour Party People	Nominated	
Golden Globe Awards	2013	Best Screenplay	Philomena	Nominated	
London Film Critics' Circle	2013	Best Screenplay	Philomena	Nominated	
London Film Critics' Circle	2018	British/Irish Actor of the Year	Stan & Ollie	Nominated	
Venice Film Festival	2013	Best Screenplay	Philomena	Won	

== See also ==
- List of British actors
- List of Academy Award winners and nominees from Great Britain
- Martin Brennan (character)
