= The Fight for Saturday Night =

Television program

The Fight for Saturday Night is a British television documentary that aired on BBC Four in December 2014, presented by former BBC One controller Michael Grade.

== Shows featured ==
- Gladiators
- The Generation Game
- The Two Ronnies
- Game for a Laugh
- Match of the Day
- The Big Match
- Blind Date
- The Late, Late Breakfast Show
- Noel's House Party
- Who Wants to Be A Millionaire?
- Friends Like These
- Pop Idol
- Strictly Come Dancing
- The X Factor
- Britain's Got Talent

== Reviews ==
Will Dean in The Independent headlined his review "Top marks for Michael Grade's illuminating look at television's golden age" and praised the show for not trying to frame the subject in terms of any social change that was happening at the time, praising the format of Grade simply talking to people involved in the shows covered, calling it "...simple, effective programme-making"
