= Renewable Energy Foundation =

British charitable organization

The Renewable Energy Foundation (REF), founded in 2004 by UK TV personality Noel Edmonds, is a United Kingdom-based registered charity with the stated aim of promoting the development of sustainable energy technologies. It has been characterised by its critics as an anti-wind farm organization.

== Activity ==
The REF's primary activity is commissioning and writing reports to provide information on energy issues.

Since 2006, the REF has published a comprehensive set of statistics, describing in detail the performance of renewable energy generators in the UK that are registered under the Renewables Obligation. On 2 February 2011, the REF released a report critical of wind power, saying it would lead to higher prices for consumers.

The REF also publishes constraint payments made by the National Grid Electricity System Operator to wind farms to reduce output. These payments are made when excess electricity is being generated in a particular region and a grid bottleneck prevents that electricity being exported to a region where the electricity could be used. Wind farm constraint payments reached a record £125 million in 2018, with Scottish wind farms receiving £115 million of this total.

In 2023, the REF published a paper titled "The Economics of Utility-Scale Solar Generation".

== Criticism ==
The REF has frequently argued against wind farm expansion, and the organization has frequently been accused of in fact being anti-wind, rather than pro-renewable energy.

Critics such as Maria McCaffery, chief executive of RenewableUK, a pro-wind trade body, says the Renewable Energy Foundation's true purpose is diametrically opposed to the interests of the wind energy industry. "It is an anti-wind lobbying organisation," she told BusinessGreen. "I'd like to know where the renewable energy part of their remit is. They don't foster or promote or develop, they just try to undermine the case for wind energy all the time."

In 2011 it was revealed that it had been in discussion in April 2008 with the Charities Commission about its possibly overly political nature.
