= The Tony Ferrino Phenomenon =

British television comedy

- VHS cover
- Genre: Variety; Parody
- Written by: Steve Coogan; Henry Normal
- Directed by: Geoff Posner
- Starring: Steve Coogan
- Country of origin: United Kingdom
- Original language: English

Production
- Producers: Geoff Posner; David Tyler
- Camera setup: Multiple camera
- Production company: BBC

Original release
- Network: BBC Two
- Release: 1 January 1997

Related
- Introducing Tony Ferrino - Who? And Why? - A Quest

The Tony Ferrino Phenomenon is a 1996 British comedy written by and starring Steve Coogan and produced by Pozzitive Television. It centres around a show given by the Portuguese singer Tony Ferrino (played by Coogan), a music and dance spectacular which featured pop stars Mick Hucknall, Kim Wilde and Gary Wilmot in guest roles.

The spoof choreography was led by Bruno Tonioli, and a recorded version of Steve Coogan as Tony Ferrino singing Tom Jones's "Help Yourself" was released by RCA Records at the same time as the TV show was released.

As part of the illusion that Tony Ferrino was a real character, the BBC also showed a fake documentary interview about Tony Ferrino's life - Introducing Tony Ferrino - Who? And Why? - A Quest. The interview was conducted by Peter Baynham, in character as Ross Woodward, a put-upon and nervous interview host.

== Reception ==
The Tony Ferrino Phenomenon was very positively received, and Coogan revived the character in his 1998 national tour 'The Man Who Thinks He's It'. It won a Silver Rose at the Rose D'Or awards in Montreaux.
