= The Bottle Yard Studios =

Film and television production studio in Bristol, England

General information
- Location: Whitchurch Lane, Bristol, BS14 0BH, Bristol, England, United Kingdom
- Coordinates: 51.4101°N 2.5809°W
- Opened: 2010

Website
- www.thebottleyard.com

The Bottle Yard Studios is a British film and television production studio facility in Bristol, South West England. It is the largest dedicated production space in the West of England. As of November 2022, it has offered a total of 11 stages across two sites.

== History ==
The Bottle Yard Studios' main site is located on Whitchurch Lane, approximately 4 miles south of Bristol city centre. In 2010, the site stood unused after operating for more than 50 years as a former winery and bottling plant. At one time it had housed the full production line for Harvey's Bristol Cream Sherry, run by John Harvey & Sons.

The studios opened in 2010 as a partnership initiative with Bristol City Council which owns the studios, transforming the disused industrial space into a busy creative hub for film and TV production with eight stages.

In its first year, the studios were estimated to have brought in £8 million in investment into the city of Bristol. In 2021, it was credited with helping achieve about a tripling of drama production in Bristol since 2010.

== Expansion ==
In 2021, the West of England Combined Authority confirmed an investment of £11.8 million to Bristol City Council for the purchase and redevelopment of industrial property at Hawkfield Business Park, less than half a mile from the original Bottle Yard site, in order to expand the Studios in response to increased production demand.

In Summer 2022 it was confirmed that the expansion site would be named TBY2 and would add three additional stages offering 20,000 sq ft, 16,500 sq ft and 7,000 sq ft of clear span, soundproofed build space with maximum heights of 34 ft. TBY2 officially opened in November 2022, increasing the total number of stages offered across the Bottle Yard's two sites from eight to 11.

TBY2's power supply is supported by a 1MWp solar array funded by Bristol Energy Cooperative, widely believed to be the biggest community-owned solar rooftop array in the UK. Bristol City Council originally planned to install a 283kWp solar array on the building, but thanks to funding from Bristol Energy Cooperative the final array was over three times larger than the original, consisting of more than 2,000 panels. During peak conditions, when the array produces more energy than the Council-owned facility needs, surplus energy will be ‘sleeved’ to other Council-owned buildings in the city via Bristol's City Leap Sleeved Pool electricity supply model. The innovative project won the Sustainable Initiative award at the 2023 Global Production Awards, presented during Cannes Film Festival. It went on to win the Innovation in Low Carbon Tech award at the Future Leap Sustainable Business Awards n November 2023.

== Productions ==
=== Scripted television ===
- Possession (2026)
- Can You Keep a Secret? (2026–)
- Agatha Christie's Seven Dials (2026)
- The Forsytes (2025–)
- The Crow Girl (2025–)
- The Road Trip (2024)
- Wolf Hall: The Mirror and the Light (2024)
- Rivals (2024–)
- A Good Girl's Guide to Murder (2024–)
- The Outlaws (2021–24)
- McDonald & Dodds (2020–2024)
- Alex Rider series 3 (2024)
- Truelove (2024)
- Boarders (2024–2026)
- Rain Dogs (2023)
- The Killing Kind (2023)
- The Flatshare (2022)
- Am I Being Unreasonable? (2022–)
- Chloe (2022)
- The Long Call (2021)
- The Girl Before (2021)
- Showtrial (2021–2024)
- Becoming Elizabeth (2022)
- The Pursuit of Love (2021)
- Sandition series 1 (2019)
- The Trial of Christine Keeler (2019–20)
- The Pale Horse (2020)
- The Salisbury Poisonings (2020)
- The Spanish Princess (2019–20)
- Poldark (2015–19)
- Fortitude series 3 (2018)
- Broadchurch series 3 (2017)
- Ill Behaviour (2017)
- Three Girls (2017)
- The White Princess (2017)
- Trollied (2011–18)
- Crazyhead (2016)
- Sherlock: The Abominable Bride (2016)
- The Living and the Dead (2016)
- Galavant (2015–16)
- Eric, Ernie and Me (2017)
- Wolf Hall (2015)
- The Lost Honour of Christopher Jefferies (2014)
- The Mimic (2014)
- New Worlds (2014)
- Frankie (2013)
- The Fear (2012)
- Public Enemies (2012)
- Inside Men (2012)
- Dirk Gently (2010–12)
- Casualty (2011)
- Five Daughters (2010)
- Excluded (2010)

=== Film ===
- The Wasp (2024)
- DarkGame (2024)
- The Undertaker (2023)
- Hellboy (2019)
- The Festival (2018)
- Golden Years (2016)
- The Adventurer: The Curse of the Midas Box (2014)
- 8 Minutes Idle (2012)
- In the Dark Half (2012)

=== Children's TV ===
- The Famous Five (2024)
- Malory Towers (2024–25)
- Andy’s Global Adventures (2023–)
- Dino Club (2023–)
- The Beaker Girls (2021–22)
- Dodger (2023–)
- The Last Bus (2022)
- The Makery (2022–)
- How (2022)
- Andy's Aquatic Adventures (2020–22)
- Art Ninja (2019)
- Andy's Safari Adventures (2018–19)
- Deadly Dinosaurs part of Steve Backshall's Deadly franchise (2018)
- Andy's Prehistoric Adventures (2016)

=== Light entertainment ===
- Tipping Point (2018–23)
- The Crystal Maze (2017–20)
- Cheap Cheap Cheap (2017)
- Deal or No Deal (2013–16)
- Hit the Road Jack (2012)
