= The Late, Late Breakfast Show =

British variety show

- Also known as: The Noel Edmonds Late Late Breakfast Show
- Genre: Variety
- Presented by: Noel Edmonds
- Starring: Leni Harper; Mike Smith; John Peel
- Country of origin: United Kingdom
- Original language: English
- No. of series: 5
- No. of episodes: 77 (inc. 4 specials)

Production
- Running time: 40–50 minutes

Original release
- Network: BBC1
- Release: 4 September 1982 – 8 November 1986

Related
- The Noel Edmonds Saturday Roadshow; Noel's House Party

The Late Late Breakfast Show is a British variety show that was broadcast live on Saturday evenings from 4 September 1982 to 8 November 1986 on BBC1. It was presented by Noel Edmonds, initially with co-host Leni Harper, and featured Mike Smith and John Peel. The "Give It a Whirl" segments featured dangerous stunts. Several serious injuries resulted from these stunts, including the death of participant viewer Michael Lush in 1986. The show was cancelled in the aftermath of this fatal accident.

== Overview ==
The Late Late Breakfast Show was the first show Noel Edmonds presented in the Saturday-evening variety slot, having left his Saturday-morning children's show Multi-Coloured Swap Shop earlier that year. Its theme tune was written by Gary Kemp and performed by Spandau Ballet. It was produced and directed by Michael Hurll. Initially, the programme struggled in the ratings and seemed unlikely to survive beyond its first series. Original co-host Leni Harper was dismissed after the third show and various revamps took place to bolster the ratings. Eventually, the inclusion of some of the biggest names in the music business, including ABBA in their last ever television appearance, as special guests helped raise the profile and ratings for the show.

The programme was described as a "mag prog [magazine programme] especially for those who get up late on Saturday, featuring comedy, pop music & a few surprises". Regular features on the show included "The Hit Squad", which was a hidden camera section; pop music performances; and "The Golden Egg Awards", which featured various outtakes. During the "Give It a Whirl" feature a member of the public would call in and have the "Whirly Wheel" spun to select a stunt, in a similar setup to gameshow Wheel of Fortune; after spending the week training, they would perform the stunt live on the next show.

== Controversy ==
=== Paul McCartney ===
On 29 October 1983, the music video for the single "Say Say Say" by Paul McCartney and Michael Jackson was shown on The Late Late Breakfast Show under controversial circumstances, after being aired on Channel 4's The Tube the previous day. The $500,000 video had not been ready when the track debuted in the UK singles chart, and by the time the video had been completed, the track had fallen in the chart. McCartney flew to London with the intention of premiering the video on the BBC's flagship music programme Top of the Pops, but the programme had a strict policy that no single that had dropped in position could feature and refused to show it. A furious argument ensued, with BBC staff reporting McCartney was threatening to withdraw all his music from the corporation.

As a compromise, the BBC offered to air the video two days later on The Late Late Breakfast Show, which featured weekly live music performances but rarely aired videos. The BBC agreed to do so only if McCartney appeared live and gave an interview. He reluctantly agreed and appeared with his wife Linda in his first live UK television appearance since 1974.

After some reportedly hostile backstage production negotiations, the programme's entire show was built around the 'medicine men' theme of the video and the guest who had been booked to appear that week, Olivia Newton-John, had to agree to appear to promote the video in a skit, reportedly against her will; Newton-John expressed anger at having her 'starring' role in the show downgraded into a lesser guest spot to make way for McCartney and his video.

Following the airing of the video, the track climbed back up the chart the following week and aired on Top of the Pops on 4 November 1983.

=== Accidents ===
There had been concern that the programme's stunts were too dangerous; indeed, the BBC was twice threatened with legal action by the Health and Safety Executive (HSE) to stop planned stunts such as plucking a member of the public from an exploding chimney by helicopter. The BBC themselves described the stunts as "some of the most daring feats ever seen on British TV". On 10 September 1983, stunt driver Richard Smith fractured his pelvis and injured his head, neck and back after crashing at 140 mph (225 km/h) during one such live stunt – an attempt to leap more than 230 feet (70 m) in a car. Also in 1983, Barbara Sleeman broke her shoulder after being fired from a cannon; she would later say, "The BBC don't give a damn. They just want the viewers."

==== Death of Michael Lush and cancellation ====
On 13 November 1986, volunteer Michael Lush fell to his death during his first rehearsal for another live stunt. The stunt, called "Hang 'em High", involved bungee jumping from an exploding box suspended from a 120-foot (37 m) high crane after escaping from a straitjacket. The carabiner clip attaching his bungee rope to the crane sprang loose from its eyebolt during the jump. He died instantly upon impact of multiple injuries, and The Late, Late Breakfast Show was cancelled on 15 November 1986 after Edmonds resigned, saying he did not "have the heart to carry on". The planned edition that was to be aired that night (along with an edition of the gameshow Every Second Counts) was replaced with a showing of the film One of Our Dinosaurs Is Missing.

Although the inquest recorded a verdict of misadventure, the jury was informed of several failures on the part of the BBC. Graham Games of the HSE stated that the clip could have been opened by the weight of a bag of sugar, and demonstrated that the clip sprang loose fourteen times in twenty. David Kirke, a bungee specialist from the Dangerous Sports Club, stated that a similar stunt he had been involved in had used three ropes, as opposed to the one rope used by the BBC, and shackles in the place of carabiner clips. The safety officer, Andrew Smith, was not on hand, and no supervision or demonstration from a trained stuntman had occurred. There was also no way for Lush to contact the ground once he was in the air, and nobody in the air with him in case he changed his mind; the jury heard he delayed for almost two minutes before finally being instructed to make the jump. Furthermore, despite advice against it, the BBC production team had insisted on the use of an elasticated bungee rope. Additionally, there was no airbag or safety net to cushion a hazardous fall, and Lush had drunk two pints of beer at lunch prior to the rehearsal. Finally, it was found that Lush was wearing wet boots before he jumped, which, while not contributing to the accident, was a safety hazard nonetheless.

The BBC made an ex gratia payment of approximately £120,000 to Lush's family. While the coroner recommended that safety officers be on hand during any such future stunts, BBC managing director Bill Cotton stated that there would be no future programmes that exposed members of the public to risk. After the inquest, Edmonds said, "If I was to continue my career at the BBC I would want to be fully confident about any production team I was provided with." He returned to the BBC's Saturday night lineup two years later, presenting The Noel Edmonds Saturday Roadshow.

Subsequently, the BBC was prosecuted by the HSE for breaches of the Health and Safety at Work etc. Act 1974. In court, Maurice Pallister, representing the HSE, further explained that the stunt would not have been rehearsed by any professional without an airbag in case of falls, and that "stunt experts" had told him that even professional rehearsals should have taken weeks rather than days. He exonerated the programme's visual effects designer, who "had taken a high standard of safety and doubled that to ensure it was doubly safe". However, he explained that the show's producer had only discussed the stunt with the safety officer by telephone and reiterated that the safety officer was not present at the rehearsal. The escapologist retained as Lush's trainer, Paul Matthews, was only experienced with theatrical tricks and had not performed the stunt required for the show. The BBC was fined the maximum amount of £2,000, plus costs. The magistrates chose not to refer the case to the Crown Court, where there would have been an unlimited penalty.

== Transmissions ==
=== Series ===
Series	Start date	End date	Episodes
1	4 September 1982	11 December 1982	15
2	3 September 1983	10 December 1983	15
3	1 September 1984	15 December 1984	16
4	7 September 1985	22 February 1986	22
5	13 September 1986	8 November 1986	9

=== Specials ===
Date	Title
25 December 1984	The Noel Edmonds Live-Live Christmas Breakfast Show
6 April 1985	The Noel Edmonds Golden Easter Egg Awards
25 December 1985	The Noel Edmonds Live-Live Christmas Breakfast Show
28 March 1986	The 1986 Golden Egg Awards

== See also ==
- Chase Me, a Chinese stunt game show which was also cancelled after a fatality
- Wetten, dass..?, a German game show where a stunt left a man permanently paralyzed
