= Leni Harper =

Scottish actress

- Born: 19 March 1954 (age 72); Glasgow
- Occupation: Actress
- Known for: Me and My Girl

Leni Harper is a Scottish actress, best known for playing Maddie in Me and My Girl.

== Career ==
Leni's breakthrough role was in a 1981 West End production of The Best Little Whorehouse in Texas. In 1982 she was recruited for the role of spinning the Whirly Wheel on the first series of The Late Late Breakfast Show, but her "whirlybird" role was dropped after three shows (pre-filmed inserts were seen for a further three weeks).

During 1982-83 Leni appeared in the BBC's teen-oriented sketch show Dear Heart, which also featured Billy Hartman, Nicky Croydon, Bob Goody and Trevor Laird.

In 1984-5 Harper appeared as co-host on BBC One's children's game show So You Want to be Top?. During this period she also appeared on primetime TV in the role she would probably become best known for, as Maddy in LWT's comedy Me and My Girl alongside Richard O'Sullivan.

In 1989–91 she played Meg in a touring production of The Meg and Mog Show and was also heard in BBC Radio 2's McKay the New. Later in the 1990s she had various roles in Chucklevision on BBC One.

Later roles included an episode of Casualty and a role in the 2007 movie Death Defying Acts.

== Selected filmography ==
Year	Title	Role
1982	The Late, Late Breakfast Show (TV series)	Herself
1982	Hi-de-Hi! (TV series)	Girl
1982–1983	Dear Heart (TV series)	Various Characters
1984–1985	So You Want to be Top? (UK game show)	co-host
1984–1985	Me and My Girl (TV series)	Maddie
1994–1995	Chucklevision (TV series)	Mrs McAlastair
1997	Chucklevision (TV series)	Manager's wife
1999	Chucklevision (TV series)	Mrs Hepplewhite
2000	Casualty (TV series) (TV series)	Janine Harrison
2008	Death Defying Acts (Film)	Leith Romeo's Wife
