= Emma Ferguson =

British actress

- Years active: 1999-2010
- Spouse: Mark Owen (m. 2009)
- Children: 3

Emma Ferguson is a British retired actress. She is best known for her starring role in the series Mile High and appearances in North and South and The Brides in the Bath.

== Early life ==
Emma Ferguson is from Wandsworth, London. She travelled regularly from a young age, living in countries such as Hong Kong, Germany and The UAE (in Dubai). During this time, she studied at military schools and learned three languages.

== Career ==
On screen, Ferguson has appeared in TV commercials (particularly hair product advertising) and various television programmes including Doctors, The Bill and Mile High. She also provided the voice acting for the character Jessica in the English language version of the PlayStation 2 game Dragon Quest VIII.

In the theatre, Ferguson has appeared as Countess Florence/Antonescu in Terence Rattigan's Man and Boy's 2004 tour and West End run, directed by Maria Aitken; as Constanza, in the London Symphonia's 2003 production of Amadeus, directed by Jonathan Best; and as Isabelle in a 2000 production of Ring Round the Moon, at the King's Head Theatre, directed by Phil Willmott.

Ferguson starred in Mile High as Emma Coyle, alongside Adam Sinclair, James W. Redmond, Jo Anne Knowles, Matthew Chambers, Naomi Ryan, Sarah Manners and Tom Wisdom.

== Personal life ==
In 2006, Ferguson became engaged to her boyfriend, Take That singer Mark Owen, with whom she had been in a relationship since 2004. On 8 November 2009, the pair married in Cawdor Church, Scotland. In 2010, the couple separated after Owen publicly admitted to a drinking problem and having multiple affairs throughout their courtship. They reconciled after he went to rehab and completed his treatment.

== Acting credits ==
Year	Title	Role	Notes
1999	Barbara	Sandra	Episode: "Rivals"
1999	Brookside	Charlotte Andersen	5 episodes
2000	Doctors	Angela Ramsden	Episode: "Beating the Odds"
2000-2003	The Bill	Kim Bradley	4 episodes
2001	Down to Earth	Cathy Slater	Episode: "Gone But Not Forgotten"
2002	Doctor Who: Death Comes to Time	Magan	Episode: "Death Comes to Time"
2003	Hardware	Nurse	Episode: "Finger"
2003	Mile High	Emma Coyle	9 episodes
2003	Fortysomething	Laura Proek	6 episodes
2003	The Brides in the Bath	Alice Burnham	Television film
2004	North and South	Edith Shaw Lennox	3 episodes
2004	Dragon Quest VIII	Jessica Albert	Video game; voice only
2005	Murder Investigation Team	Lisa Reynolds	Series 2 episode 3
2005	Shinobido: Way of the Ninja	Ageha / Tateha / Usuba	Video game; English-version; voice only
2009	Killzone 2	Additional ISA Voices	Video game; English-version; voice only
2010	Castlevania: Lords of Shadow	Claudia	Video game; English-version; voice only
