= List of Mile High episodes =

The following is an episode list of Mile High television drama series.

== Series 1 (2003) ==
No.	Title	Directed by	Written by	Original release date
1	"Episode One"	Unknown	Oliver Dennis, Jane Hewland & Cameron McAllister	16 February 2003
New recruit Marco has the worst first day ever. Emma's marriage plans are threatened by the return of an ex, John. Jason finds romance with a woman who is carrying some unusual luggage. Additional Cast: Rebecca Ochonska, Gabrielle Richens, Paul Telfer, Paul Ellis, Marem Hernandez, Sophie Lindfield, Nicki Tovell, Heather Tobias
2	"Episode Two"	Unknown	Jane Hewland	23 February 2003
K.C. has a romantic encounter with millionaire Michael Webb in Palma which turns sour. On the other hand, Will helps Marco out of trouble at the Fresh! Centre, wherein the favour turns beneficial to both him and his boss. Additional Cast: Michael Praed, Steve Bennett, Hayley Menzies
3	"Episode Three"	Henry Foster & Neil Adams	Oliver Dennis, Jane Hewland & Cameron McAllister	2 March 2003
Emma is left in charge of an aircraft with devastating consequences, while Janis finds Jason and Marco in a compromising position. Additional Cast: Francis Johnson, Ruth Higham, Rachel Munday
4	"Episode Four"	Unknown	Cameron McAllister & Tom McRae	9 March 2003
Jason faces the possibility of him being a father, while a financially struggling Lehann goes to great lengths for some extra allowances. Additional Cast: Rita Simons, Annelie Whitefield
5	"Episode Five"	Unknown	Unknown	16 March 2003
Emma and Lehann have had a wild party in Alicante with music star D-Tox. Marco faces an accusation of underage sex with one of his passengers in Malaga. Additional Cast: Jade Williams, Terence Maynard, Grant Masters, Oliver Oxley
6	"Episode Six"	Henry Foster & Cameron McAllister	Oliver Dennis & Cameron McAllister	23 March 2003
Janis, Lehann, Marco & Jason are involved in an emergency landing which has lasting consequences for all of them. Additional Cast: Emma Harding
7	"Episode Seven"	Henry Foster & Cameron McAllister	Jaswinder Bancil & Jane Hewland	30 March 2003
Emma finds out who Lehann's mystery man is. Janis becomes a laughing stock courtesy of K.C. & Will. Jason faces his fear of flying. Additional Cast: Ross O'Hennessey, Richard Ulfsater
8	"Episode Eight"	Neil Adams	Jaswinder Bancil & Jane Hewland	6 April 2003
Emma discovers she is pregnant. Will becomes the centre stage of a television documentary about Fresh. K.C gets a stalker. Additional Cast: Justin Shelvin, Ramon Tikaram
9	"Episode Nine"	Neil Adams	Oliver Dennis, Jane Hewland & Cameron McAllister	13 April 2003
Marco's father has a heart attack while having sex with KC. Additional Cast: Peter Polycarpou, Alexandra Lilley, Jack Gustav
10	"Episode Ten"	Neil Adams	Oliver Dennis & Jane Hewland	20 April 2003
Will brings home a passenger on his way to Corfu. Additional Cast: Daren Jacobs, Matthew Leitch, James Bradshaw, Rebecca Deren
11	"Episode Eleven"	James Strong	Cameron McAllister & Jane Hewland	27 April 2003
Will's botox surgery goes wrong, and his friends take him out to celebrate his birthday. Additional Cast: Victoria Pritchard, Glynn Williams, Gareth Marks
12	"Episode Twelve"	James Strong	Jane Hewland & Cameron McAllister	4 May 2003
Emma attempts suicide because of her marital problems. A Scandinavian prince travels on the airline. Additional Cast: Cassandra Bell, Charles de'Ath, Brett Alexander, Leigh Cranston
13	"Episode Thirteen"	James Strong	Jane Hewland & Oliver Dennis	11 May 2003
Marco decides to quit his job, and Will bakes him a cake laced with marijuana. The whole gang ends up getting in trouble. Additional Cast: Tim Barlow, Naoki Mori, Victoria Pritchard, Dermot Keaney

== Series 2 (2004–2005) ==
No.	Title	Directed by	Written by	Original release date
1	"Episode One"	Paul Kousoulides	Oliver Dennis & John Ramster	22 February 2004
Marco catches Janis and Nigel having sex on a plane and is horrified to learn that CCTV cameras have been installed on selected 737s. Jack's sister Poppy is saved from drowning. Additional Cast: Luis Alberto Soto, Guy Parry, Sarah Matravers, Jamie Knights, Barry Dowden, Charles Daish, Kal Weber, Lucy Evans
2	"Episode Two"	Paul Kousoulides	Oliver Dennis & John Ramster	29 February 2004
Poppy steals her sister's passport when she finds out she is too young to sign up for training to be a flight attendant. Additional Cast: Emma Willis, Jeremy Spake, Kal Weber, Charles Daish, Lucy Evans
3	"Episode Three"	Jon Eckersley	Jane Hewland & Bardley Quirk	7 March 2004
Lehann doesn't know whether or not she trusts Marvin. Jack does some smuggling to get money for an engagement ring for Lucy. Additional Cast: Niko Nicotera, Charles Daish, Jo Bourne-Taylor, Kal Weber, Stephen Marcus, Alexi Kaye Campbell
4	"Episode Four"	Jon Eckersley	J. M. White & Jane Hewland	14 March 2004
Lehann gets arrested when she unknowingly carries drugs belonging to Jack through customs. Additional Cast: Robin Kermode, Rhydian Jones, Kal Weber, Charles Daish, Lesley Willett, Phil Nice, Emma Willis
5	"Episode Five"	Marcus D. F. White	Jane Hewland & John Ramster	21 March 2004
Lehann goes to court on smuggling charges. Lottery-winner Carole charters a Fresh plane and enjoys Will's company, much to Janice's annoyance. Charlotte brings Jack back to the UK to help Lehann. Additional Cast: Charles Daish, Beverley Callard, Louis Emerick, Issac Issay, Robin Kermode, Keith Hazemore
6	"Episode Six"	Marcus D. F. White	Jane Hewland & Katherine Knowles	21 March 2004
Will tries to get his job back. Jack helps a frightened traveller. Additional Cast: Peter Sullivan, Tracy Shaw, Martin Crewes, Victoria Leigh
7	"Episode Seven"	Jonathan Eckersley	Oliver Dennis & Jane Hewland	4 April 2004
The crew anticipates trouble on a flight to Malaga when a male passenger is overheard asking his family for forgiveness. Additional Cast: Charles Daish, Lucy Evans, Daniel Green, Mazhar Munir, Matthew Jay Lewis, Mat Ruttle, Richard Northen, Adam Harvey, Hannah Steadman, Badi Uzzaman, Ian Henderson, Ashvin-Kumar Joshi, Jane Seeker

== Series 3 (2004–2005) ==
The series was later combined with Series 2.

No.	Title	Directed by	Written by	Original release date
8	"Episode Eight"	Unknown	Jane Hewland & Paul Hodson	5 September 2004
The crew expects layoffs when Fresh! merges with another airline; long-haul airline operator Goldstar. Additional Cast: Lucy Evans, David Bamber, Emma-Jane Portch, Robert Finan, Marc Elliot, Ben Forster, Nichola Theobald (uncredited)
9	"Episode Nine"	Ray Kilby	Oliver Dennis & Jane Hewland & Paul Hodson	12 September 2004
Due to a scheduling oversight at Fresh/Goldstar, Captains Croker and Dan Peterson both believe that they are commanding officer of a flight, and trouble and rivalry ensues. A noisy dog in the cargo hold causes problems, when concerns are raised over its safety and welfare. Will and Poppy assist Goldstar transferee Lorna in transporting a large painting to the boat of Frank, her boyfriend.
10	"Episode Ten"	Steve Finn	John Ramster	19 September 2004
Fresh cleaning employee Susie moves into the crew flat disguising herself as a flight attendant. Dan, Lehann and Rachel find themselves in trouble when they meet Rachel's husband Mike, and travel with him to Toronto. Additional Cast: Sheridan Smith, Billy Geraghty
11	"Episode Eleven"	Steve Finn	Katherine Knowles & Ryan Craig	29 September 2004
Two reporters acting as Emirates aircrew entrap Captain Croker in a scandal by pretending to be romantically interested in him. Will and Croker conspire to find a scapegoat to take the blame. Lehann assists a young solo traveller on his way to his dad, with an unusual item in his hand luggage. Purser Kevin MacMillan, Rachel and Lorna have to locate the cause of a bad smell on an aircraft. Additional Cast: Helen Lederer
12	"Episode Twelve"	Joss Agnew	Jane Hewland & Bradley Quirk	3 October 2004
Croker and Dan Peterson have both been temporarily demoted due to the previous events in the cockpit. A group of nervous flyers boards a flight, to learn how to fly without becoming anxious under the guidance of a behavioural therapist, Jonathan. Croker becomes ill and ends up in hospital. While drunk and drugged, Will pulls a dangerous stunt on a balcony. Additional Cast: Darren Day
13	"Episode Thirteen"	Joss Agnew	Bradley Quirk & Jane Hewland	10 October 2004
Croker and Dan Peterson undertake flight simulation re-training and examinations to regain their Command status; overseen by Captain Robin. Janis and Lehann interfere during Croker's supervised flight and violence breaks out on Dan's, resulting in him needing to make a drastic decision.
14	"Episode Fourteen"	Riita Leena-Lynn	John Ramster & Tom Rob Smith	17 October 2004
When a disturbance occurs on a flight, Ed (a previous aircrew employee of Fresh and now a male stripper) steps in to calm the situation. Poppy doesn't feel like celebrating her 18th birthday, but Will and Lorna take her to a drag nightclub in Barcelona. Rachel discovers she is pregnant. Janis discovers that a child on a flight from North Africa could be seriously ill.
15	"Episode Fifteen"	Riita Leena-Lynn	Katherine Knowles & Ryan Craig	24 October 2004
Dan is blackmailed by Mike, and is forced to find alternative ways to earn fast money. Additional Cast: Ewen Macintosh
16	"Episode Sixteen"	Riita Leena-Lynn	Jane Hewland & Katherine Knowles & Maddie Sinclair	31 October 2004
Rachel ponders what to do about her pregnancy as Dan and Mike both think they are the father of her baby. Ed runs into a newlywed he slept with on her hen night. Additional Cast: Emma Gilmour, Ewen Macintosh
17	"Episode Seventeen"	Riita Leena-Lynn	Jane Hewland & Paul Hodson	7 November 2004
Lehann, Lorna and Rachel make a packet from selling alcohol to soldiers during their flight to Kosovo. Events take a tragic turn during a scam, back at Fresh, by Jack and Jackie.
18	"Episode Eighteen"	Joss Agnew	Jane Hewland & John Ramster	14 November 2004
Completely distraught after the death of her brother, Poppy manages to find a light-hearted new friend while boarding the plane. Additional Cast: Kara Tointon
19	"Episode Nineteen"	Joss Agnew	Jane Hewland & Bradley Quirk & Tom Rob Smith	1 June 2005
Will finds the other crew members relate to him differently after his promotion.
20	"Episode Twenty"	Marcus D. F. White	Jane Hewland & Cameron McAllister & Maddie Sinclair	8 June 2005
Staff members vie for the Fresh Employee of the Year Award. Will initiates a new management initiative to get revenge. Rachel receives an offer of a new job from a passenger impressed with her initiative and efforts to please, that appears to be back in her preferred First Class surroundings.
21	"Episode Twenty-one"	Marcus D. F. White	Jane Hewland & Katherine Knowles	15 June 2005
Dan tries to get time alone with Lehann, but their plans result in embarrassment for Janis. Rachel discovers that her new job with the charter airline in the Middle East isn't what she expected. When Rachel reaches out to Lehann for help, Janis steps in to assist them, but at a price. Additional Cast: Alison Cain, Daniel Lundh, Vincent Marcell
22	"Episode Twenty-two"	Joss Agnew	Katherine Knowles	22 June 2005
Will is selected to provide solo crew on a mail flight to Minsk, alongside Captain Robin and a non-communicative security escort and has to find ways to keep himself entertained until he discovers that the flight also has bags of money on board. The discovery of a flea infestation on an aircraft in Vilnius leads to intimate body examinations for Janis, Lehann and Ed. Croker and Lorna encounter a young boy who is terminally ill, on a journey to Disneyland Paris and later make a discovery that results in a moral dilemma. Additional Cast: Silvio Simac, Carole Nimmons
23	"Episode Twenty-three"	Joss Agnew	Paul Hodson, Lana Inglis & Maddie Sinclair	29 June 2005
Croker and Lorna head for a romantic getaway in Brighton. However, it's Gay Pride week, and Will, Lehann and Nick are also on their way there for the party weekend. Poppy and Ed travel with Gina, an old aircrew acquaintance of his and an apparent fantasist, who is travelling to Alicante to seek out a Spaniard she met previously and is in love with. Additional Cast: Juan Pablo Di Pace Sarah Hadland
24	"Episode Twenty-four"	Marcus D. F. White & Joss Agnew	Jane Hewland & Lana Inglis & Maddie Sinclair	6 July 2005
Janis has trouble with the actions and sabotage of Will and Lehann, who interfere after the arrival of a Civil Aviation Authority safety inspector on her flight. A heart-broken Lorna is romanced by check-in desk assistant, Robbie Smith. After a showdown with the inspector and facing embarrassment during re-training, Janis makes a dramatic decision. After a complaint is made against her of unfair harassment, The NAA inspector is determined to snare a member of Flight Deck and targets Croker. Dan finds out some upsetting news regarding Lehann, that results in him making a serious error of judgment. Additional Cast: Luke De Woolfson, Charlotte Weston, Lorelei King
25	"Episode Twenty-five"	Marcus D. F. White & Joss Agnew	Jane Hewland & Katherine Knowles	13 July 2005
Frustrated and Annoyed passengers, including a heavily pregnant woman, cause problems because of weather-related flight delays. With Croker's help, Captain Dan makes some changes to his life after his arrest and revocation of his private and commercial licences, and threat of further legal action. The weather strands Janis and Will on a motorway slip-road.
26	"Episode Twenty-six"	Joss Agnew & Marcus D. F. White	Jane Hewland & John Ramster	20 July 2005
Series finale. (This episode is told in a series of flashbacks). Some Fresh aircrew, preparing for a hen party, arrive at a beach bar named "Mile High," run by Janis. They ask her about "the incident" at Fresh... Janis, Lehann and Jackie are all invited by Fresh to enjoy a free weekend holiday in the company's villa in Punta Rossa – but all is not what it initially seems. Will faces an agonising wait for some test results, and makes an intoxicated revelation during a recruitment event in Split, Croatia with Poppy and Kevin. The stress placed by Nigel's ex-wife and the divorce papers has disastrous consequences when Nigel suffers a heart attack upon landing in London, and three people die when the aircraft fails to stop; over-shooting the runway. Some old rifts are finally healed as Will and Janis go into business together (running The beach bar) and Lorna steps into Janis' shoes as Senior Purser. Ed and Poppy start a new life together in Minsk. Additional Cast: Charles Daish, Alison King, Sarah Matravers
