= Footjob =

Sex with feet/soles

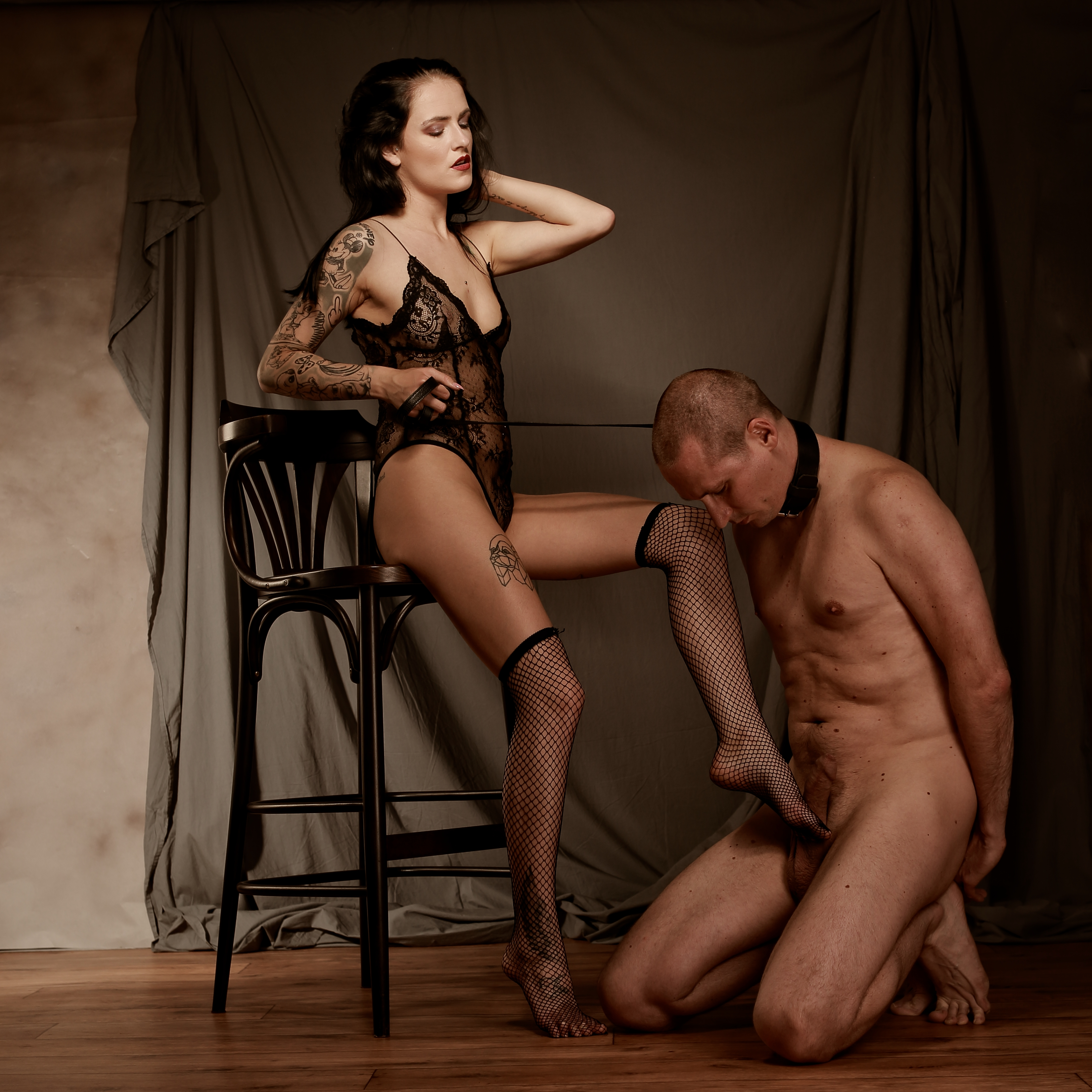
A woman performing a footjob

A footjob is a non-penetrative sexual practice where the feet are used to stimulate a partner's genitals. The sexual rubbing may involve toes, one or both feet, stroking massage, and excitement to orgasm.

While commonly associated with feet directed on a partner's penis, a footjob may focus on a partner's vulva or anus. For some individuals the practice may be an aspect of a foot fetish.

== Popular culture ==
An illustration of a mutual footjob by André Lambert, c. 1917

- In the Desperate Housewives episode "Suspicious Minds", Gabrielle Solis (Eva Longoria) seduces John Rowland (Jesse Metcalfe) by rubbing her feet against his crotch under a restaurant table.
- In the 1975 film The Beast (La Bête), Romilde de l'Esperance (played by Sirpa Lane) is chased by a werewolf-like creature, who receives sexual satisfaction from de l'Esperance by receiving a footjob from her (as well as other things) as she hangs on the branch of a tree.
- In 1985 film Flesh and Blood, Agnes (Jennifer Jason Leigh) rubs her foot against Martin's (Rutger Hauer) crotch to seduce him during lunch after they captured the castle.
- In the 1994 film Sirens, Estella (Tara Fitzgerald) rubs her foot against her husband Anthony's (Hugh Grant) crotch in a shared suite on a train in the final scene of the film.
- The 2004 British movie 9 Songs features a prominent footjob in a bathtub scene between lovers Matthew (Kieran O'Brien) and Lisa (Margo Stilley).
- In episode eight of series two of the British drama Mile High, Eloise (Nichola Theobald) rubs her foot against Captain Nigel Croker's (Christopher Villiers) crotch to seduce him into giving her money.
- In the film Rabbit Without Ears 2, Marie (Edita Malovčić) seduces Ludo (Til Schweiger) by rubbing her foot against his crotch.
