= Alien Harvest =

2019 American short film

- Directed by: Benjamin Howdeshell
- Written by: Craig Dewey
- Based on: Alien by: Dan O'Bannon; Ronald Shusett
- Produced by: Shawn Wallace
- Starring: Agnes Albright; Jessica Clark; Adam Sinclair; James C. Burns
- Cinematography: Chris Saul
- Edited by: Jake Shaver
- Music by: Danny Cocke
- Production companies: Tongal Studios; 20th Century Fox
- Distributed by: IGN; 20th Century Fox
- Release dates: April 19, 2019 (IGN); May 3, 2019 (Fox)
- Running time: 9 minutes
- Country: United States

Alien Harvest is a short film based on the science fiction action media franchise Alien. Released via IGN on April 19, 2019, coinciding with the 40th anniversary of the franchise, the film was written by Craig Dewey and directed by Benjamin Howdeshell, through Tongal Studios and 20th Century Fox. Starring Agnes Albright, Jessica Clark, Adam Sinclair and James C. Burns, the film follows four survivors of a crippled vessel locked on a collision course with a comet, as they must contend with the Xenomorph loose on board.

The twentieth short film in the Alien franchise, it received a generally positive critical reception.

== Plot ==
The USCSS November slowly drifts onto a collision course with the comet that it was attempting to harvest, as the four surviving crew (Mari, Hannah, Alec, and Sturgis) set out to make their way to the ship's escape pods, seeking to avoid the Xenomorph also loose onboard. Proceeding through the ship under Mari's leadership after Sturgis is killed, on reaching the final escape pod, on finding there is only room for two people to escape, Mari overrides the pod's safety parameters so that it will launch with more than two life forms, strapping Alex and Hannah in. As they prepare to eject, a containment warning announcement plays, and Alec is attacked in his seat by a facehugger, as Mari watches smiling from the open hatch, before she is impaled by the Xenomorph, revealing her to be a synthetic, and implying she has planned for Alec and Hannah to be impregnated to ensure as Xenomorph sample reaches the Weyland-Yutani Corporation (the Company). As another egg aboard the pod opens and begins disgorging the Facehugger within, the escape pod's hatch seals, trapping the screaming Hannah within. As the pod is jettisoned, the November is destroyed, and the pod sends an automated transmission to the Company confirming the presence of alien specimens on board.

== Cast ==
- Agnes Albright as Mari
- Jessica Clark as Hannah
- Adam Sinclair as Alec
- James C. Burns as Sturgis
- Heather Foster as the Ship's Computer
- Michelle Falanga as Laurel Tooms

Alex Ward portrays the titular Xenomorph.

== Production ==
In July 2018, it was reported that 20th Century Fox had joined forces with Tongal Studios to produce a series of Alien short films to coincide with the 40th anniversary of the franchise. By March 2019, the details of the short films were released, Tongal co-founder and CEO James DeJulio describing the joint-production as "reflective of Tongal's mission to bring creative opportunities to the next generation of talent." The fifth short released and the twentieth overall in the franchise, Alien Harvest was written by Craig Dewey and directed by Benjamin Howdeshell, filming having taken place over two days at Laurel Canyon Stages in Los Angeles, where the following short film Alien Alone was also filmed.

== Release ==
Alien Harvest was released on the IGN website on April 19, 2019, after which it was uploaded to the Alien Universe website, and all Alien social media pages on May 5, 2019, the short film then premiering alongside five others at the Emerald City Comic Con in Seattle, and as a Movies Anywhere-exclusive bonus feature accompanying the digital release of Alien.

== Reception ==
Alien Harvest received a positive critical reception, with The Stop Button praising the "good performance" of Jessica Clark, and Under Southern Eyes noting the film as having "stunning CGI visuals, a scary setting in a failing spaceship, a willing cast and a lot of tension".
