= Giles Kristian =

English novelist

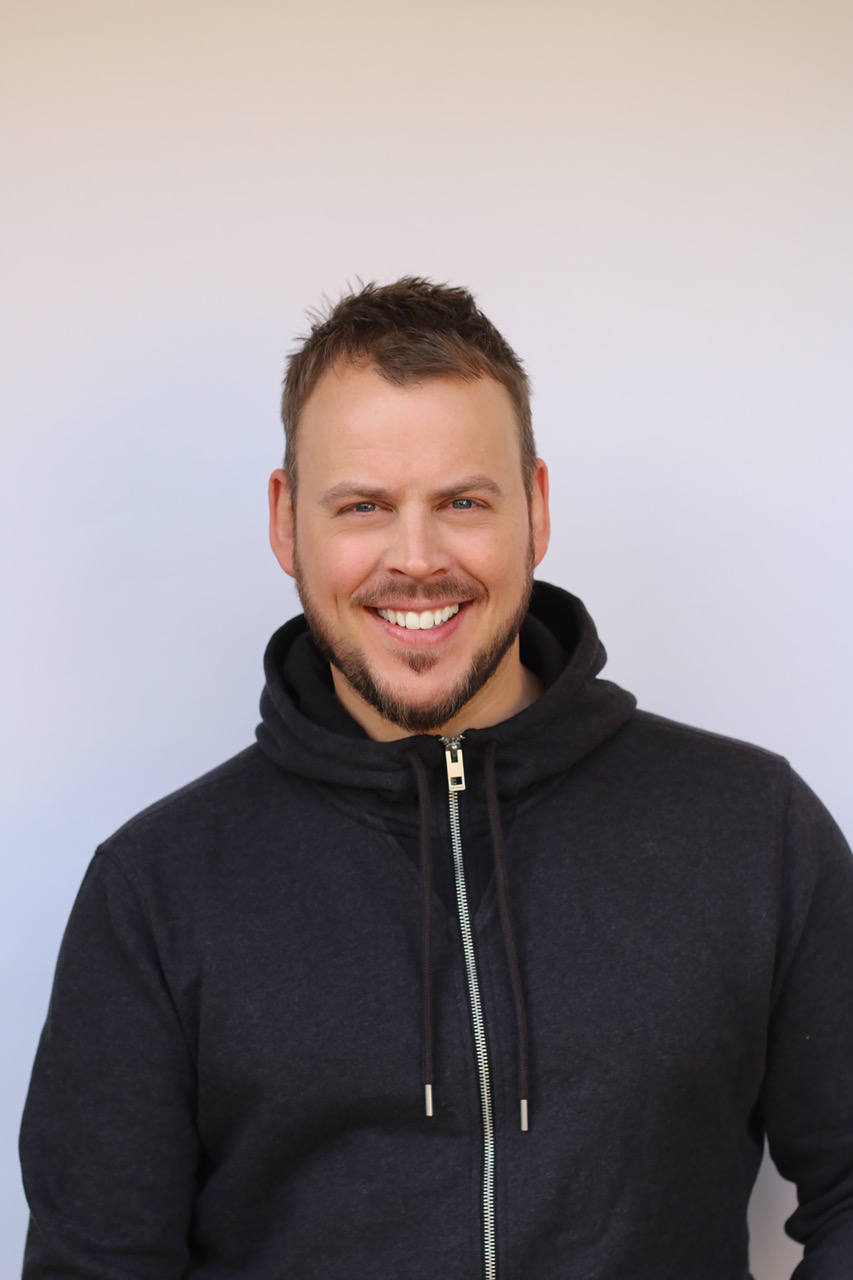
Giles Kristian book cover photo 2018

Giles Kristian (born 1975) is an English singer and novelist, known for his action adventure novels in the historical fiction genre. He is best known for his Raven series, about a young man's coming of age amongst a band of Viking warriors. His first novel, the bestselling Raven: Blood Eye, was published to great acclaim (including an accolade from Bernard Cornwell). Two further novels complete the Raven Saga; Sons of Thunder and Odin's Wolves, and to date the books have been published in eight languages. He has written two books set during the English Civil War The Bleeding Land and Brothers Fury published by Transworld Publishers. In 2015, he co-wrote Golden Lion with Wilbur Smith, part of Smith's bestselling Courtney series. This book was a no.1 bestseller across three continents. Kristian's second Viking series, The Rise of Sigurd trilogy, comprises God of Vengeance (a Times Book of the Year) Winter’s Fire and Wings of the Storm. Kristian worked as a narrative designer on the Multiplayer online survival roleplaying game Valnir Rok, developed by encurio GmbH. Kristian's novel, Lancelot, published in 2018 tells the story of one of the great figures of British myth and legend. It reached No. 6 in The Sunday Times bestseller list and No. 3 in The Times bestseller list. Its sequel Camelot, was published in May 2020.

Kristian is also the co-founder of UK based production company World Serpent Productions, for which he writes and produces; his 2016 short film, The Last Viking, (written and produced by Kristian and directed by Philip Stevens) was selected for the 2017 Aesthetica film festival, and the 2017 Midlands Movies Awards. Kristian is an executive producer for World Serpent Productions debut feature film Lapwing, due for release in winter 2020.

== Background ==
Giles Kristian was born in 1975, in Leicestershire, England, to a Norwegian mother and an English father. During the 1990s, he was selected from 8000 hopefuls to become lead singer of the pop group Upside Down, achieving three top twenty hit records on the UK Singles Chart with the boy band, performing at such venues as the Royal Albert Hall, N.E.C. and Wembley Arena. As a singer-songwriter, he signed to the record label The M-Company and toured for two years in Europe, releasing the record I Just Wanna Know in 2001. He has worked as a model, appearing in press campaigns and TV commercials. He has been an advertising copywriter and lived for nearly three years in New York, where he wrote copy for the movie marketing company, Empire Design.

== Works ==
=== Raven saga ===
- 2010 Raven: Blood Eye
- 2011 Raven: Sons of Thunder
- 2012 Raven: Odin's Wolves

=== Rise of Sigurd saga ===
- 2014 Rise of Sigurd: God of Vengeance
- 2016 Rise of Sigurd: Winter's Fire
- 2016 Rise of Sigurd: Wings of the Storm

=== Civil War series ===
- 2012 The Bleeding Land
- 2013 Brother's Fury

=== The Arthurian Tales series ===
- 2018 Lancelot
- 2020 Camelot
- 2024 Arthur

=== Other works ===
- 2015 Golden Lion with Wilbur Smith
- 2022 Where Blood Runs Cold
