= Nigel Croker =

- Mile High character
- First appearance: Series 2, Episode 1
- Last appearance: Series 2, Episode 26
- Portrayed by: Christopher Villiers

In-universe information
- Nickname: Croker
- Occupation: Pilot

Captain Nigel Croker is a fictional character from the TV programme Mile High. He was played by Christopher Villiers when the series ran between 2004 and 2005. There were plans for Mile High to return, but this did not materialise.

== Final episode ==
Whilst flying back from Spain, Nigel suffers a heart attack whilst on approach to a London airport. The flight attendants pull him out of the cockpit, and Janis Steel and Lehann Evans attempt to resuscitate him as the plane lands, but as Nigel had not armed the speed brake for landing, the aircraft overshoots the runway, killing Lehann and two passengers. Nigel survives the accident as mentioned at the end of the episode.

== Relationships ==
Nigel Croker has had many relationships, most of which appear in the final episode, when his ex-wife invites them to their villa in Spain.

=== Janis Steel ===
Nigel Croker and Janis Steel go back a long way, in which he made her abort their child. In Series 2 they get back together after Nigel was kicked out by his wife Denise Croker.

In series 2, episode 11, Nigel invites a passenger into the cockpit who turns out to be an undercover journalist. The incident ends up in the newspaper which lands all the crew of the flight in trouble, especially the purser, Janis Steel. Nigel blames Janis who consequently loses her job without knowing Nigel had blamed her. At the end of the episode, Marco Bailey tells Janis that Nigel and Will O'Brien had set her up, causing her to dump Nigel.

=== Lorna Newbold ===
Towards the end of Series 2, Nigel starts a relationship with Flight Attendant Lorna Newbold. Janis is clearly jealous and mocks Nigel. Nigel, realising that Lorna is probably too good for him, dumps her, leaving her heart broken and deciding she no longer wants to fly. In the final episode, Nigel invites Lorna to his villa in Spain, unaware that all of his former lovers are there, after being invited by his ex-wife, Denise. Lorna stands up for herself and tells everyone that she loves Nigel. At the end of the episode it is revealed by Janis that Nigel and Lorna are still together after his heart attack.

=== Eloise ===
Although they were never in a proper relationship, Nigel and Eloise (Nichola Theobald) briefly had a fling after she used her feet to seduce him under the table in order to gain money to go to a nightclub. After this they would have sex on several occasions.
