= Boyz Unlimited =

British comedy TV series

- Created by: Richard Osman; Matt Lucas; David Walliams
- Directed by: Liddy Oldroyd
- Starring: Frank Harper; James Corden; Adam Sinclair; Lee Williams; Billy Worth
- Country of origin: United Kingdom
- Original language: English
- No. of series: 1
- No. of episodes: 6

Production
- Production company: Hat Trick Productions

Original release
- Network: Channel 4
- Release: 5 February – 12 March 1999

Boyz Unlimited is a British comedy series, which aired on Channel 4 from 5 February to 12 March 1999. A six-part satire about the music industry, the show featured Nigel Gacey (Frank Harper), a career criminal, giving himself a year to form his own boy band and his attempts to do so. It was produced by Hat Trick Productions and credited as being written by Richard Osman. Ratings and critical reception were both poor, and the programme was not recommissioned; David Walliams would later claim that his experiences caused both him and Matt Lucas to refuse to work with Hat Trick on subsequent projects for many years, and Osman's experiences would cause him to lose confidence in his writing ability.

== Background, production, and plot ==
In the 1990s, boybands were popular, with acts such as New Kids on the Block, Take That, Boyzone, and 911 achieving success during this period. GMTV attempted to enter the market with its own boyband, The One, and 2point4 Children broadcast a storyline in which the programme's teenage son joined a boyband called Boyband. In addition, BBC One aired an episode of Inside Story called The Band is Born, which launched the career of Upside Down, and then inspired by that, David Walliams and Matt Lucas used their Comedy Central (then Paramount) comedy series Mash and Peas to satirise the genre.

After Paramount broadcast the series, Hat Trick Productions invited the pair to produce a six-part series for Channel 4, and the pair began writing the series with the former firm's Richard Osman, with whom Walliams had previously worked, and whose brother was Mat Osman, the bassist for Suede. At the time, Lucas and Walliams were of the understanding that they would star as parodies of Gary Barlow and Howard Donald.

Walliams wrote in his 2012 autobiography Camp David that Lucas and Osman did not get on, and that in December 1997, Walliams, Lucas, and their agent were summoned to the offices of Hat Trick's Jimmy Mulville, who admonished the pair at length before instructing them to leave his office; he also alleged that the pair only signed the release to allow Hat Trick to make the programme after their agent told them they would never work in television again if they did not, and that for almost a decade afterwards, both he and Lucas refused to appear on any programmes produced by Hat Trick.

The programme was shot in late 1998, and directed by Liddy Oldroyd. Filming took place over seven weeks, with Phil Harding and Ian Curnow producing the series' songs. The show depicted Nigel Gacey, a successful armed robber and conman played by Frank Harper, who decided to give himself a year to form his own boyband, with James Corden playing Gareth Jones, a loose pastiche of Barlow Lucas had written for himself.

Having found Jones, he advertises in The Stage for bandmembers, from which he rounds up Giles Hornchurch (Lee Williams), Jason Jackson (Adam Sinclair), and Nicky Vickery (Billy Worth); Worth had previously been a member of GMTV's The One. After rechristening Hornchurch to the more boyband-friendly Scott Le Tissier, the quartet sign to a record label, whose executive rechristens them Boyz Unlimited from a list of marketable band names. Further storylines include Vickery's ex-headmistress carrying his baby, Jackson being pursued by debt collectors seeking the return of £20,000, Hornchurch's parents going on hunger strike, and a rivalry with Boys Ltd, who formed just before them.

== Release, reception, and aftermath ==
The show was promoted with articles in the NME and The Independent. Both articles stated that Osman had written and produced the show, with the latter claiming that it was Osman who was inspired by the Inside Story episode about the creation of Upside Down. By a coincidence, the show was broadcast a few months after Bryan Elsley's The Young Person's Guide to Becoming a Rock Star, and a few weeks after one of the tracks covered by Boyz Unlimited, "A Little Bit More" by Dr. Hook & the Medicine Show, topped the UK singles chart in the form of a cover by 911; Osman used a January 1999 article to note that the song had been selected specifically due to its graphic lyrics being "too tasteless for a pre-pubescent audience, and thus ideal for comic purposes".

The show premiered on 5 February 1999, and received generally negative critical reception. W. Stephen Gilbert of The Times considered that The Young Person's Guide to Becoming a Rock Star made Boyz Unlimited redundant, and criticised its documentary style, on the grounds that "few actors (certainly few young actors) are adept at playing "real" as if unscripted", and opined that Hat Trick should have "know[n] better than to produce an object lesson in how not to entertain the youth market". Another review, from The Herald, described Boyz Unlimited as having about a quarter of the flair of The Young Person's Guide to Becoming a Rock Star, and a Mark Lewisohn review, which described the show as a "savage and cynical attack", prompted Walliams and Lucas to lighten the tone of their subsequent writing. A retrospective 2007 Popjustice review was slightly more positive, and opined that "a lot of the brilliant script is quite poorly executed, but the jokes are strong enough to mean that the show's still worth half an hour of your time".

The show also rated poorly on its initial outing, and it quickly became clear that the show would not be recommissioned after its final episode aired on 12 March 1999. Osman would later release The Thursday Murder Club in September 2020, which achieved massive success, and which was described by The Guardian as "the biggest thing in fiction since Harry Potter"; in 2021, he used a GQ interview to suggest that the failure of Boyz Unlimited dented his confidence for years afterwards. Mulville later apologised to Walliams after running into him at a dinner party, having recently run into him in Old Compton Street in Soho while he was with Geoff Posner and Lucas, and later wrote Lucas a letter of apology; by the time of Camp David, Osman had not apologised.

== Cast ==
- Frank Harper as Nigel Gacey
- James Corden as Gareth Jones
- Adam Sinclair as Jason Jackson
- Lee Williams as Scott Le Tissier
- Billy Worth as Nicky Vickery
- Jo Whiley as Narrator
- Vincenzo Nicoli as Mick McNamara
- John Hodgkinson as Steve Peebles
- Anna Wilson-Jones as Katie May
