= Mayo (TV series) =

- Main cast
- Genre: Detective fiction Comedy
- Created by: Marjorie Eccles
- Developed by: Simon Booker
- Starring: Alistair McGowan; Jessica Oyelowo; Huw Rhys; Louise Brealey; Lucy Evans
- Composer: Joby Talbot
- Country of origin: United Kingdom
- Original language: English
- No. of series: 1
- No. of episodes: 8

Production
- Executive producers: Sally Haynes; Will Trotter
- Producer: Rebecca Hedderly
- Cinematography: Toby Moore
- Editors: Paul Endacott; Anthony Combes
- Running time: 60 minutes
- Production company: BBC Birmingham

Original release
- Network: BBC One
- Release: 12 March – 30 April 2006

Mayo is a British television detective fiction-comedy series, adapted from the Gil Mayo Mysteries series books by Marjorie Eccles, first broadcast on BBC One on 12 March 2006. The eight-part series, produced by BBC Birmingham, starred Alistair McGowan as the titular character, alongside Jessica Oyelowo, Huw Rhys and Louise Brealey. The series was developed by Simon Booker, and directed by Metin Huseyin, Jonathan Fox Bassett and Fraser MacDonald.

The series was filmed on location in and around Leamington Spa. Each of the eight episodes were based upon one of Eccles' novels, aside from the final episode, which was an original story for television by Joe Ainsworth. McGowan provided additional script dialogue for all eight episodes, and was also heavily involved in helping produce the series. Notable guest stars throughout the series run included former Doctor Who Sylvester McCoy and actress and singer Paloma Faith.

== Cast ==
- Alistair McGowan as Detective Inspector Gil Mayo
- Jessica Oyelowo as Detective Sergeant Alex Jones
- Huw Rhys as Detective Constable Martin Kite
- Louise Brealey as SOCO Harriet 'Anorak' Tate
- Lucy Evans as Julie Mayo

== Broadcast ==
The series aired at 20:00 on Sundays, with the first episode drawing almost 4.5 million viewers. Across the series, no further viewing figures were recorded. The series broadcast in Australia on ABC1 in mid-2008, and was repeated on 7Two in 2011, under the pseudonym The Gil Mayo Mysteries.

On 23 March 2007 McGowan confirmed that Mayo would not return for a second series. McGowan commented on the series axing; "It was taking its time to find its feet, and by the end, we knew what we were doing. But sadly, decisions are made on the first episode, and we definitely didn't hit the ground running. We learnt how to make a very good programme and we were all really surprised and very disappointed that we didn't get another series. It is sad."

== Episodes ==
No.	Title	Directed by	Written by	Original release date	Viewers (millions)
1	"Cast a Cold Eye"	Metin Huseyin	Simon Booker	12 March 2006	4.46
A man is found dead at an exclusive rehabilitation clinic, having named the centre's founder as his beneficiary. Mayo and the team investigate whether the death was suicide or murder. Guest starring: Paterson Joseph and Margo Stilley
2	"Requiem for a Dove"	Metin Huseyin	Simon Booker	19 March 2006	N/A
Mayo and the team investigate the death of Marion Dove, a successful businesswoman found dead beneath a fallen chandelier. Guest starring: Nigel Planer and Geoffrey Whitehead
3	"A Species of Revenge"	Metin Huseyin	Michael Wynne	26 March 2006	N/A
The body of a man is found in an allotment, having been struck on the head and drowned in the night, but no one comes forward to identify him. Guest starring: Tamsin Egerton, Jake Wood and Sara Stewart
4	"Late of This Parish"	Fraser McDonald	Michael Wynne	2 April 2006	N/A
Mayo investigates the brutal murder of a residential care-home owner found bludgeoned to death in his wheelchair. Guest starring: Art Malik, Sylvester McCoy and Heather Peace
5	"A Sunset Touch"	Fraser MacDonald	Tom MacRae	9 April 2006	N/A
Jones goes for a beauty makeover in an attempt to elicit information about the murdered husband of the owner of a local beauty salon. Guest starring: Ruth Jones and Gaynor Faye
6	"Killing Me Softly"	Fraser MacDonald	Danny Miller	16 April 2006	N/A
Mayo and the team investigate the death of a geography teacher and uncover gambling debts and drug dealing. Guest starring: Jeremy Edwards and Paloma Faith
7	"More Deaths than One"	Jonathan Fox Bassett	Colin Bytheway	23 April 2006	N/A
The body of a murdered estate agent is found on the eve of his wedding, while the owner of a rival firm has disappeared. Guest starring: Claire King and Tony Haygarth
8	"Scrubbed Out"	Jonathan Fox Bassett	Joe Ainsworth	30 April 2006	N/A
Mayo and Jones investigate the murder of a cleaner, asphyxiated with her own duster. Guest starring: Tristan Gemmill and David Oyelowo
