= Kieran O'Brien =

British actor (born 1973)

- Born: 1973 (age 52–53); Oldham, Lancashire, England
- Occupation: Actor
- Years active: 1986–present

Kieran O'Brien (born 1973) is an English actor.

== Early life and education ==
Born in Oldham, Lancashire, O'Brien grew up in nearby Royton, and was educated at the Bishop Henshaw Roman Catholic Memorial High School in Rochdale.

== Career ==
O'Brien began acting at an early age and was the star of BBC TV series Gruey by the time he was 15. He also featured in several other series at the time in one-off or recurring roles including several episodes of Jossy's Giants.

He played two roles in Coronation Street, Joe Egerton in 1990 and Craig Lee in 1993. In 1993 he also played the role of Lee Jones in Children's Ward, and became a regular in the detective series Cracker, as the titular character's son.

In 1999, O'Brien appeared in his first feature film, Virtual Sexuality. In 2001, he played the role of Private Allen Vest in HBO's acclaimed series Band of Brothers where he played a prominent part in the episode "The Last Patrol". He also appeared in the 2002 film 24 Hour Party People. In 2003, he appeared in the Cooper Temple Clause music video "Promises, Promises" and can be seen saying he got 'laid' in the Millennium Dome in the making of the video.

In 2004, O'Brien appeared in the controversial film 9 Songs. According to The Guardian, 9 Songs was the most sexually explicit mainstream-film to date, largely because it includes several scenes of real, sexual acts between the two lead actors. His role is highly unusual in that he had unsimulated and very graphic sex with his co-star Margo Stilley, including genital fondling, female masturbation with and without a vibrator, penetrative vaginal sex, cunnilingus, footjob, and fellatio. During a scene in which Stilley stimulates his penis with her hand after performing fellatio on him, he became the only mainstream British actor who has been shown ejaculating in a mainstream UK-produced feature.

O'Brien strongly defended the film during the controversy that followed, saying that he saw no problem with having sex for a film. He said:

"People who say they find it offensive are liars. If they say they find it shocking, I don't believe them. It's only sex. To me they were just scenes we were shooting, to be honest, and I was surprised how ordinary and how natural it was. But it's a different thing for a girl than it is for a lad. I didn't fancy her—I felt protective towards her. On set she was the only woman with a crew of four lads. I know how difficult it was for her. You can't get away from the fact she's a young girl."

To date, O'Brien continues both his television and film acting careers. Recent appearances have been made in The Road to Guantánamo (2006) and Totally Frank (2005–06), as well as a reprise of his role in Cracker.

O'Brien was also one of the stars of the BBC's police drama HolbyBlue, appearing from the first episode until the third episode of the second series.

In 2013, O'Brien toured the UK in a stage production of Simon Beaufoy's 1997 comedy-drama film The Full Monty, in which he plays the "absurdly over-endowed" guy.

== Personal life ==
O'Brien was in a relationship with Brookside actress Nicola Stephenson for eight years until 1999.

== Filmography ==
Year	Title	Role	Notes
1987	Bellman and True	The Boy	
1999	Virtual Sexuality	Alex Thorne	
2001	My Kingdom	Photographer	
2002	24 Hour Party People	Nathan	
2004	9 Songs	Matt	
2005	A Cock and Bull Story	Gary	
2005	Goal!	Hughie McGowan	
2006	The Road to Guantánamo	Voice Over	
2007	Goal II: Living the Dream	Hughie McGowan	
2008	Genova	Reading Sonnet	Voice
2012	Spike Island	Poster Vendor	
2013	The Look of Love	Jimmy Humphries	
2018	Peterloo	Farrier	
2018	Holmes & Watson	Lestrade's P.C. Smalls	

== Television ==
Year	Title	Role	Notes
1986	Jossy's Giants	Cheeky Boy	2 uncredited episodes
1987	One by One	Neville	2 episodes
1987	Bulman	Peter Malin	Episode: "W.C. Fields Was Right"
1988	The Return of the Antelope	Newsboy	Episode: "Emily"
1988–1989	Gruey	Gruey	Main role
1989	Dramarama	Trotter	Episode: "Ghost Story"
1989	The Jim Henson Hour	Matt Banting	Episode: "Monster Maker"
1990–1991	Children's Ward	Lee Jones	Main role
1990–1993	Coronation Street	Craig Lee / Joe Egerton	15 episodes
1991–1993	Casualty	Billy/Chris Miller	2 episodes
1991, 1998	The Bill	Gary Lee / Paul Mears	2 episodes
1992	Kappatoo	Tau 4	7 episodes
1993	Medics	David	Episode #3.2
1993	The Lodge	Giblet	4 episodes
1993	Heartbeat	Neil	Episode: "Speed Kills"
1993–1995	Cracker	Mark Fitzgerald	Main role
1997	Born to Run	Ryan Flitch	6 episodes
1998	Harry Enfield & Chums		Episode: "Harry Enfield's Yule Log Chums"
2000	Jason and the Argonauts	Actor	2 episodes
2000	Hearts and Bones	Robbie Rose	6 episodes
2001	Messiah	Eric Metcalfe	2 episodes
2001	Band of Brothers	Allen E. Vest	3 episodes
2002	Stig of the Dump	Damian	Episode: "Undercover"
2002	Always and Everyone	Michael	2 episodes
2002, 2008	Holby City	Neil Stevenson / PC Robert Clifton	2 episodes
2003	Messiah 2: Vengeance Is Mine	Eric Metcalfe	2 episodes
2003	Burn It	Andy Grimshaw	Episode #1.6
2004	Dalziel and Pascoe	Chris Mattis	Episode: "Soft Touch"
2005	Bloodlines	Mark Hopkin	TV film
2005	New Tricks	Michael Jacobs	Episode: "Eyes Down for a Full House"
2005–2006	Totally Frank	Joe	15 episodes
2006	Elizabeth David: A Life in Recipes	Charles Gibson Cowan	TV film
2006	The Afternoon Play	Sean Tyler	Episode: "Tea with Betty"
2006	Cracker: Nine Eleven	Mark Fitzgerald	TV film
2007	Life on Mars	Davie Mackay	Episode #2.7
2007–2008	HolbyBlue	PC Robert Clifton	Main role
2008	The Last Enemy	Wafa	2 episodes
2008	Survivors	John	Episode #1.5
2009	Blue Murder	Terry Camerton	2 episodes
2010	Secret Diary of a Call Girl	Al	Episode #3.5
2010	Moving On	Shane	Episode: "Trust"
2011	Vera	Bobby Salter	Episode: "Little Lazarus"
2011	Death in Paradise	Danny Fernandez	Episode: "An Unhelpful Aid"
2012	Love Life	Dez	3 episodes
2014	The Assets	Randy	Episode: "Jewel in the Crown"
2014	Bluestone 42	Nutsack	2 episodes
2014	Silk	Sean	3 episodes
2014	Grantchester	Arthur Evans	Episode #1.3
2014	Glue	Thomas Bray	2 episodes
2014	The Passing Bells	Frank	Episode #1.2
2015	The Syndicate	Andy Stevenson	Recurring role
2015	Prey	Phil Prentice	2 episodes
2016	Shield 5	Doyle	Short film-exclusive to Instagram
2016	The Watchman	Lee	TV film
2017	No Offence	DI Stone	Episode #2.3
2017	In the Dark	DS Gary Kenny	2 episodes
2018	Cuckoo	Goran	Episode: "Ivy Nanny"
2019	Chernobyl	Valery Khodemchuk	Episode: "Vichnaya Pamyat"
2019	Years and Years	Woody	2 episodes
2020	Isolation Stories	Stranger's Husband	Episode: "Mel"; Voice
2020	Cursed	Reith	2 episodes
2020	The Cars That Made the World	Narrator	Voice
2020–2023	Ted Lasso	James Tartt	5 episodes
2022	Andor	Pegla	3 episodes
2023	The Family Pile	Stuart	6 episodes
