= 9 Songs =

2004 film by Michael Winterbottom

- Theatrical release poster
- Directed by: Michael Winterbottom
- Written by: Michael Winterbottom
- Produced by: Andrew Eaton; Michael Winterbottom
- Starring: Kieran O'Brien; Margo Stilley
- Cinematography: Marcel Zyskind
- Edited by: Mat Whitecross; Michael Winterbottom
- Production company: Revolution Films
- Distributed by: Optimum Releasing
- Release date: 16 May 2004
- Running time: 70 minutes
- Country: United Kingdom
- Budget: £1 million
- Box office: $1.6 million

9 Songs is a 2004 British erotic art film written and directed by Michael Winterbottom. The film stars Kieran O'Brien and Margo Stilley. The title refers to the nine songs played by eight rock bands that complement the story of the film.

The film was controversial upon original release due to its sexual content, which included unsimulated footage of the two leads, Kieran O'Brien and Margo Stilley, having sexual intercourse and performing oral sex as well as a scene of ejaculation. The film was showcased at the Cannes Film Festival.

== Plot ==
Having met at a Black Rebel Motorcycle Club gig Matt and Lisa, an exchange student, have sex, the next day she leaves for work. Matt narrates the relationship from the future, where he is a climatologist in Antarctica.

After seeing The Von Bondies, Matt performs cunnilingus on Lisa, followed by them having sex on the sofa. They then consume cocaine and have sex. A few days later, they see Elbow. They stay at a cottage, where Matt receives a footjob from her in the bath. He swims nude in the sea, they see Primal Scream. They have sex again and go clubbing. The following morning, he blindfolds her, ties her up, and performs cunnilingus on her. After having sex, they see The Dandy Warhols. Lisa is then blindfolded again, and Matt fingers her. They visit a strip club, where nude women dance on Lisa. Remembering the naked women, Lisa masturbates with a dildo. Matt walks out, leaving Lisa at the strip club. This causes them to become distant. The next morning, Matt watches Lisa masturbate, disappointed.

Matt goes to the Super Furry Animals alone. They argue, but later Lisa buys some high heeled leather boots and ties Matt up, followed by them having sex again. The next morning, she performs fellatio on him. They see Franz Ferdinand, then stay at a hotel for Matt's birthday. They consume cocaine a second time before visiting a Michael Nyman concert, and Lisa tells Matt she is returning to America.

The next morning, they have sex yet again. Years later, Matt is flying over Antarctica. We see the Black Rebel Motorcycle Club close the film.

== Cast ==
- Kieran O'Brien as Matt
- Margo Stilley as Lisa

== Production ==
On the first day of filming in fall 2003, Margo Stilley and Kieran O'Brien shot a scene of solely making out and undressing. "It wasn't until after lunch that we had sex," O'Brien recalls. As would happen throughout the shoot, Winterbottom left little to chance. "He really mapped out everything," O'Brien says. "The order he wanted me to take off my clothes, her clothes, whether my socks stayed on or not. He had specific ideas of how he wanted our bodies to move. Sometimes, he would start us and then stop and say, 'Let's try this from a slightly different angle,' and then take 15 minutes to reset the shot. I wondered if he remembered the delicate machinery of the male sex organ."

=== The nine songs ===
1. "Whatever Happened to My Rock and Roll", Black Rebel Motorcycle Club
2. "C'mon, C'mon", The Von Bondies
3. "Fallen Angel", Elbow
4. "Movin' on Up", Primal Scream
5. "You Were the Last High", The Dandy Warhols
6. "Slow Life", Super Furry Animals
7. "Jacqueline", Franz Ferdinand
8. "Debbie", Michael Nyman
9. "Love Burns", Black Rebel Motorcycle Club

== Reception ==
On the review aggregator website Rotten Tomatoes, 23% of 95 critics' reviews are positive. The website's consensus reads: "The unerotic sex scenes quickly become tedious to watch, and the lovers lack the personality necessary to make viewers care about them." Metacritic, which uses a weighted average, assigned the film a score of 43 out of 100, based on 29 critics, indicating "mixed or average" reviews.

Derek Malcolm of The Guardian praised the film: "Nine Songs looks like a porn movie, but it feels like a love story. The sex is used as a metaphor for the rest of the couple's relationship. And it is shot with Winterbottom's customary sensitivity."

Radio Times gave a lackluster review, awarding it two stars out of five, claiming: "From the hot, blurry chaos of the gigs to the sparsely furnished flat where the couple unite, this is very much an exercise in style over content. As such, some will find it a rewarding art house experiment with much to recommend it, others watching simply for the explicit and unsimulated lovemaking may well find it boring and pretentious."

Writing for East Bay Express, Luke Y. Thompson claimed: "Michael Winterbottom delivers the sex, and not much else." He continued: "Though there isn't much narrative in effect, Winterbottom does quite literally build to a climax...O'Brien is well endowed, while Stilley is all natural...If the movie were any longer, the onscreen events might become a lot more tedious, but there are just enough different things each time to avoid dull repetition. You may have seen a handjob onscreen, for instance, but have you ever seen a foot job? It's interesting, to say the least."

=== Controversy ===
According to The Guardian at the time, 9 Songs was the most sexually explicit mainstream film to date, largely because it includes several scenes of real sex between the two lead actors. The film is unusual in that its lead actors, Margo Stilley and Kieran O'Brien, actually had sex on set, much of which is shown clearly in the film, including genital fondling, masturbation with and without a vibrator, penetrative vaginal sex, cunnilingus and fellatio. During a scene in which Stilley gives O'Brien a handjob after performing fellatio on him, O'Brien became the only actor who has been shown ejaculating in a mainstream, UK-produced feature. To avoid a possible pregnancy, O'Brien wore a condom on his erect penis during the vaginal sex but not while receiving oral sex. Margo Stilley initially asked Winterbottom to refer to her simply by her character's name in interviews about the film.

The release sparked a debate over whether the scenes of explicit sex artistically contributed to the film's meaning or crossed the border into pornography. In the United Kingdom, the film received an 18 certificate from the British Board of Film Classification and became the most explicit mainstream film to be so rated in the country. MP Ann Widdecombe complained about the film in the UK House of Commons and called on the Home Secretary to reverse the decision to release it uncut.

In Australia, the Office of Film and Literature Classification gave the film an X rating, which would have prevented the film from being shown theatrically and restricted sale of the film to the Australian Capital Territory and Northern Territory. The OFLC Review Board later passed the film with an R rating, although the South Australian Classification Council raised the rating back to X in South Australia.

In New Zealand, while the Society for the Promotion of Community Standards lobbied for the film to be kept out of cinemas, it was passed uncut at R18 by the Office of Film and Literature Classification. The film was broadcast on New Zealand pay TV Rialto Channel in July 2007.

In June 2008, the film was broadcast on Dutch national television by the public broadcasting station VPRO.

== See also ==
- Unsimulated sex
