= Mat Ruttle =

British-based actor

Mat Ruttle is a British-based actor who has appeared in television programs such as Messiah IV: The Harrowing (BBC1), The Bill, Mile High, Shoot the Writers and Morris 2274.

Ruttle trained at the Guilford School of Acting; he has done some stage work in Lotty's War, The Masque of the Red Death, and made his stage debut in Marrying the Mistress in 2005. He was part of the cast of The Railway Children which opened at London's Waterloo station on 12 July 2010, ending on 2 January 2011. He has done some television commercials and is a member of the comedy group "One Inch Punch".

He also appeared in the National Theatre's award-winning production of War Horse at the New London Theatre from 2012 to 2013.

The Waterloo production won an Olivier Award for Best Entertainment in 2011.
