= Margo Stilley =

American actress

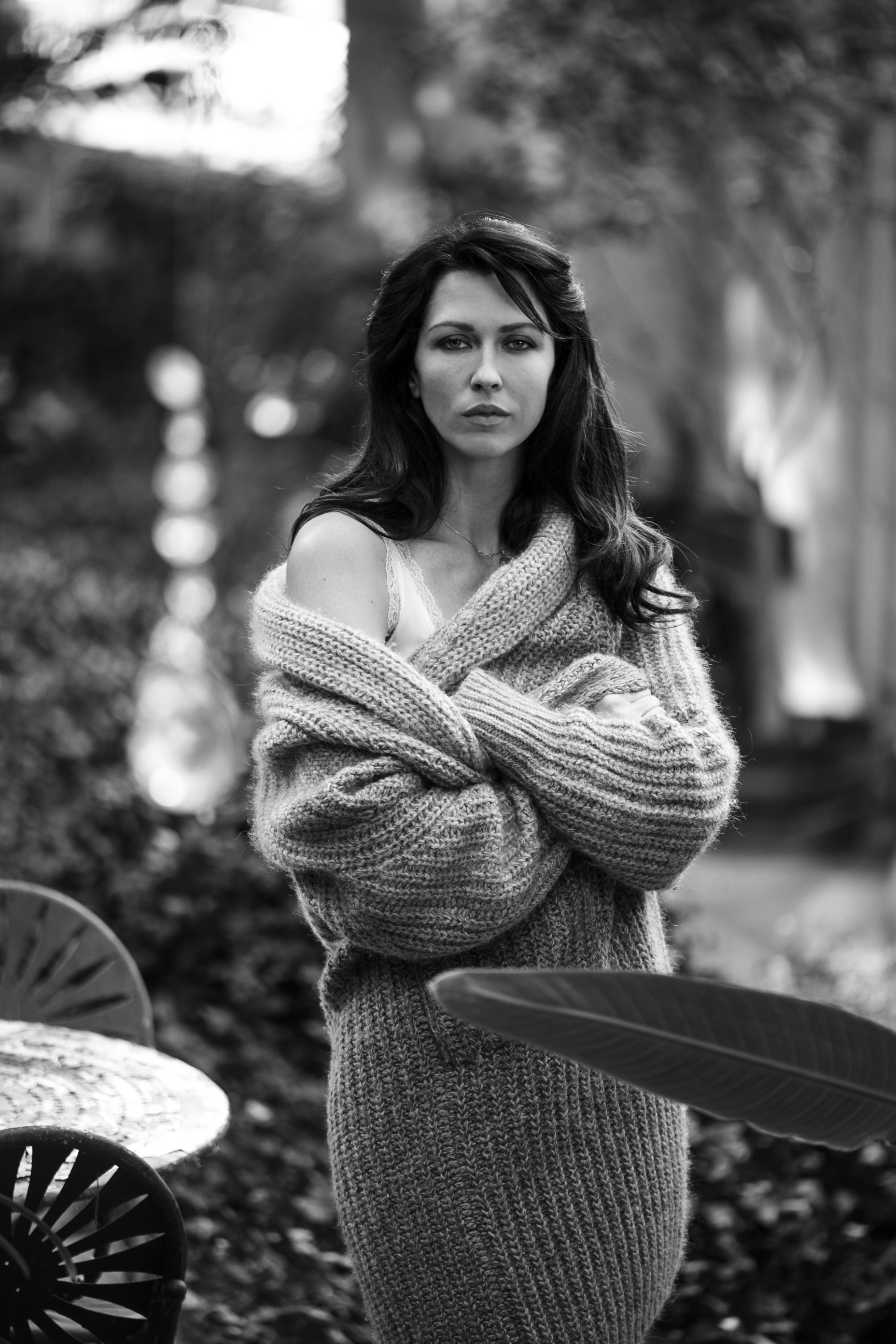
- Stilley in 2015
- Born: November 20, 1982 (age 43); Conway, South Carolina, U.S.
- Occupation: Actress
- Years active: 2004–2020
- Website: margo-stilley.com

Margo Stilley (born November 20, 1982) is an American actress, having had roles in How to Lose Friends & Alienate People (2008), Marple: Murder Is Easy and Hippie Hippie Shake (2009), The Trip (2010), and The Royals (2016). She is most remembered for appearing in her debut film 9 Songs (2004), which has been described as the most sexually explicit mainstream film ever produced in the United Kingdom.

== Early life and education ==
Stilley was born in Conway, South Carolina, and grew up between there and Swansboro, North Carolina. She was raised in a strict Baptist household. The day she turned 16 years of age, she moved out of her family home and lived on her own. She put herself through high school working as a telemarketer and a lifeguard until she graduated a year early from Conway High School with honors in art and history. She was voted "The Funniest" in the class of 2000. Stilley has been a long time supporter of hands-on charitable acts. In high school, she volunteered at local nursing homes feeding and reading to the elderly. She was offered a full scholarship to Savannah College of Art and Design, which she declined.

== Career ==
She left the rural South as a teenager to begin working briefly as a model in Milan with Elite Model Management in February 2001, before moving to London by the end of the year, at the age of 18, to pursue her acting career.

Her first acting job was to star as Lisa, the lead actress in the controversial 2004 British film 9 Songs, directed by Michael Winterbottom. Her interest in art as a platform led to her decision to accept the role. According to the Guardian, 9 Songs was the most sexually explicit mainstream film to date, largely because it includes several scenes of real sexual acts between Stilley and her co-star, actor Kieran O'Brien. Her role is highly unusual in that she had unsimulated and very graphic sex with O'Brien, including genital fondling, female masturbation, with and without a vibrator, penetrative vaginal sex, cunnilingus, footjob and fellatio. During a scene in which Stilley stimulates his penis with her hand after performing fellatio on him, he became the only mainstream British actor who has been shown ejaculating in a mainstream UK-produced feature. The film screened in Cannes Film Festival and Sundance Film Festival and had a worldwide theatrical release. Stilley asked that director Michael Winterbottom refer to her simply by her character's name in interviews about the film at the beginning to protect the artistic integrity of the film.

Her second credit was a role in the first episode of the satirical comedy Nathan Barley directed by Chris Morris for British television.

Stilley has since appeared in 19 American and British productions, including How to Lose Friends & Alienate People, with Simon Pegg and Jeff Bridges, and Agatha Christie's Marple (Murder Is Easy), with Benedict Cumberbatch, and has worked again with Winterbottom on a BBC Two comedy The Trip, with Steve Coogan and Rob Brydon.

She appeared as a model in feature articles in Vogue, In Style UK, The Face, Harper's Bazaar, Black Book Magazine and Elle. She has been a presenter at award shows, handing a Fashion Awards to Giles Deacon at the 2006 Elle Style Awards and presenting the New Designer Award to Christopher Kane at the 2007 British Fashion Awards.

In 2010, she signed on to play Lady Furness in Madonna's film WE, but renounced the role because of artistic differences.

In 2026, Stilley joined the cast of the reality television series Ladies of London: The New Reign, which premiered on Bravo on March 5, 2026.

== Selected filmography ==
- 9 Songs (2004) ... Lisa
- Mayo (1 episode, 2006) ... Roma Sheraton
- Reverb (2007) ... Nicky
- How to Lose Friends & Alienate People (2008) ... Ingrid
- Marple: Murder Is Easy (2009) (TV) ... Bridget Conway
- Goal! 3 (2009) ... Tamsin
- Hippie Hippie Shake (2009) ... Cynthia Plaster Caster
- 14 Days with Victor (2010) ... Anna
- The Trip (2010) ... Mischa
- Across Time I Cry (2014) ... Lisabet
- Darknet Delivery: A Silk Road Story (2015) ... Anna
- Still Waters (2015) ... Bradbury
- Everything Carries Me to You ... Vicki
- The Royals (2016) ... Harper
- The Trip to Spain (series 3 of The Trip) (2017) ... Mischa
- The Host (2020) ... Sarah
