= The Stepfather (TV series) =

- Episode 1 Title Card
- Genre: Crime drama
- Written by: Simon Booker
- Directed by: Ashley Pearce
- Starring: Philip Glenister; Robert Bathurst; Lindsey Coulson; Lucy Evans; Jack Wilson; Con O'Neill; Janine Carrington; John Rowe; Vashti MacLachlan
- Composer: Richard G. Mitchell
- Country of origin: United Kingdom
- Original language: English
- No. of series: 1
- No. of episodes: 2

Production
- Executive producer: Carolyn Reynolds
- Producer: Alison Lumb
- Cinematography: John Pardue
- Editor: Les Healey
- Running time: 90 minutes
- Production company: Granada Television

Original release
- Network: ITV
- Release: 6 February – 7 February 2005

The Stepfather is a two-part British television crime drama series, written by Simon Booker and directed by Ashley Pearce, that first broadcast on ITV on 6 February 2005. The series, which stars Philip Glenister and Lindsey Coulson, follows divorcee Dougie Molloy (Glenister), a man haunted by the disappearance of his fifteen-year-old daughter, who three years on, tries to rebuild his life by marrying a fellow divorcee, Maggie Shields (Coulson). But when Maggie's daughter Scarlett disappears in similar circumstances, Molloy's possible involvement in both crimes is investigated by the police.

The series was filmed in and around Soho, London. The series was later broadcast in Sweden, Australia, Brazil (under the title O Padrosato) and France (under the title Suspicion). The series gathered respectable viewing figures, with 6.7 million tuning in for the first episode, and a further million tuning in for the second episode. Notably, the series has yet to be released on DVD.

== Cast ==
- Philip Glenister as Dougie Molloy
- Robert Bathurst as Christopher Veazey
- Lindsey Coulson as Maggie Shields
- Lucy Evans as Scarlett Veazey
- Jack Wilson as Luke Schofield
- Con O'Neill as Bruce Shapiro
- Janine Carrington as Anita Gibson
- John Rowe as George Saville
- Vashti MacLachlan as Kath Schofield
- Anna Wilson-Jones as Sasha Munro
- Holly Davidson as Pippa Molloy
- John Bowe as DI Mendoza
- Abigail Thaw as DS Sullivan
- Vanessa Knox-Mawer as Mrs. Porter
- Trish Cooke as Mrs. Gibson
- Thea Day as Nikki
- Ricky Nixon as Woody
- Lucy Brooks as Tracey Ann
- Lewis Yarwood as Ryan
- Frankie Fitzgerald as Beemer

== Episodes ==
No. overall	No. in series	Title	Directed by	Written by	Original release date	Viewers (millions)
1	1	"Part 1"	Ashley Pearce	Simon Booker	6 February 2005	6.76
Dougie Molloy's 15-year-old daughter, Pippa, has been missing for three years. Refusing to give up hope of finding her, Dougie decides to throw in his school teaching job and gets a job as a mini-cab driver, hoping to spot her as he scours the streets of London. Despite being accused of murder, and blaming himself for her disappearance, Dougie manages to find love and happiness again with fellow divorcee Maggie Shields. Six months into the relationship, Maggie's 16-year-old daughter Scarlett makes it clear that she is unhappy about Dougie's plan to move in. She rejects his over-protectiveness and turns to her barrister father, Christopher, for support. Christopher, who can’t help resenting Dougie, voices concerns about his past and showers undue attention on Scarlett. Trouble flares further when Maggie and Dougie announce they are getting married, but the celebrations are soon put on hold when Scarlett mysteriously disappears.
2	2	"Part 2"	Ashley Pearce	Simon Booker	7 February 2005	7.71
Luke discovers a video of Scarlett taken by Christopher which shows him in a less than fatherly light. Christopher's computer is also discovered to have accessed a pornographic, sado-masochistic website. Maggie’s concern over Scarlett’s disappearance is exacerbated by a claim from one of Dougie’s ex-pupils, who says he is the father of her child. Meanwhile, Dougie and Christopher join forces to search for Scarlett and turn their attention to Luke, and stricken by her conscience after reading about Scarlett’s disappearance, Pippa returns, easing police suspicions about Dougie, but she soon presents him with a problem of her own. Despite tensions, Pippa decides to help him discover details of Luke's unsavoury past, the involvement of Shapiro and his link to Scarlett.
