= Kristallnacht (film) =

American drama film

- Directed by: Stefan Ruzowitzky
- Screenplay by: Stefan Ruzowitzky; Julius Grützke; Jonathan Frank; Scott Mann
- Produced by: Michael Benaroya; Danny Krausz; Marcelo Gandola; Daniel Zuta
- Starring: Clive Owen
- Production companies: Benaroya Pictures; Dor Film; Cinelaunch
- Countries: United States; Austria; Germany
- Language: English

Kristallnacht is an upcoming historical thriller directed by Stefan Ruzowitzky and starring Clive Owen, set in Berlin in the 1930s based on the historical events of Kristallnacht.

== Premise ==
In Germany in the 1930s, a Berlin police officer defies his orders and tries to aid the city's Jewish population.

== Cast ==
- Clive Owen as Wilhelm Krützfeld
- Alex Pettyfer
- Karl Markovics
- Mélanie Laurent
- Bradley James
- Steven Berkoff
- Alexander Lincoln

== Production ==
The film is directed by Stefan Ruzowitzky from a script he co-wrote with Julius Grützke, based on an original script by Jonathan Frank and Scott Mann. Michael Benaroya will serve as producer alongside Danny Krausz, Marcelo Gandola and Daniel Zuta. Benaroya Pictures and Dor Film are co-producers. Cinelaunch CEO Chris K. Daniels and head of development Jess Mastro serve as executive producers.

The film stars Clive Owen. Alex Pettyfer and Karl Markovics joined the cast in November 2024. They were later joined in the cast by Mélanie Laurent, Bradley James and Steven Berkoff. Principal photography took place in Austria in the first half of 2025 with filming finishing in May 2025. That month, first-look images from filming were released.

In Austrian media, the film has also been referred to under the alternate titles "Enemy Within" and the German language title "Der Wachtmeister" (The Constable").
