= Lucy Evans =

English actress

- Born: 26 May 1985 (age 40); England, United Kingdom
- Occupation: Actress
- Years active: 1996–present
- Notable credit(s): Microsoap (1998–2000); Mayo (2006); Coronation Street (2007–2008)

Lucy Evans (born 26 May 1985) is an English actress best known for playing the role of Lauren Wilson in Coronation Street from 2007–2008.

Other roles include that of Debs in Mile High. She is a supporter of the League Against Cruel Sports.

== Filmography ==
=== Film ===
Year	Title	Role	Notes
2009	The 7th Dimension	Zoe	
2016	Angel of Decay	Vonnie	
20??	Sedu	Girl 3	Short, completed

=== Television ===
Year	Title	Role	Notes
1996	The Fortunes and Misfortunes of Moll Flanders	Moll Flanders (young)	TV film
1998–2000	Microsoap	Felicity Smart	Main role
2004	Mile High	Debs	Episodes 2.1, 2.7
2004	Hollyoaks	Rachel Osborne	Episode 1235
2004	Holby City	Emma Winchester	Episode: "Smoke and Mirrors"
2005	The Stepfather	Scarlett Veazey	TV miniseries
2005	The Quartermass Experiment	Janet	TV film
2005	Rocket Man	Angela Stevenson	TV miniseries
2006	Mayo	Julie Mayo	Main role
2006	Brief Encounters	Dannielle Tulloch	Episode: "Hot or Not"
2006, 2017	Doctors	Sophie Penrose, Tia Wesley	Episodes: "The Sound of Rainbows", "The Open Road"
2007–2008	Coronation Street	Lauren Wilson	Regular role, 46 episodes
2008	The Things I Haven't Told You	Darcy	TV film
2008	Dis/Connected	Natasha	TV film
2008	Waking the Dead	Picnic Woman	Episode: "Duty and Honour: Part 1"
2009	My Family	Amanda	Episode: "Dog Dazed"
2010	Lab Rats	Liz	
2014	Casualty	Mia Cornwell	Episode: "First Impressions"
2015	Three Bad Dates, One Soulmate	Rana	TV film
