= Stacey Cadman =

British actress and television presenter

- Born: 23 May 1979 (age 47); Sutton Coldfield, West Midlands, England
- Education: John Willmott School; Arts Educational Schools

Stacey Cadman (born 23 May 1979) is a British actress, television presenter, dancer, voice artist, choreographer and performing arts educator.

Cadman is best known for playing the title role in the BBC television series Cavegirl and Poppy Fields in the Sky One drama Mile High. Her other television credits include the BBC comedy Blessed, Love Soup and Casualty, alongside presenting work for the BBC and Channel 4. She was also runner-up in Sky One's Cirque de Celebrité.

== Early life and Training ==
Cadman was born and raised in Sutton Coldfield, West Midlands, and attended John Willmott School.

She trained at Birmingham Stage School from childhood and began performing professionally at the age of eight, appearing in pantomimes, theatrical productions and live events at venues including the Birmingham Hippodrome.

She later studied performing arts and dance in Birmingham before training in musical theatre at the Arts Educational Schools in London.

== Television Career ==
Cadman's breakthrough came when she was selected from hundreds of actresses to play the title role in the BBC television series Cavegirl.

Filmed on location in the wilds of South Africa. She also performed the programme's theme song.

The series subsequently received the Children's Award at the BBC's 2004 awards for independent television production, giving Cadman an early leading role in an award-winning BBC series.

Following Cavegirl, Cadman joined the cast of the Sky One drama Mile High. as Poppy Fields.

She later appeared in the BBC comedy series Blessed, created by Ben Elton, in the recurring role of Bling. Cadman had originally auditioned for a different role, but the character of Bling developed from the interpretation she brought to the audition and was subsequently developed with Elton.

Her further television acting credits include Love Soup and Casualty.

== Television Presenting ==
Alongside her acting career, Cadman worked as a television presenter.

Her BBC presenting credits include Smile and The Saturday Show.

In 2005, she presented Monster Jam for Channel 4, working with Mike Kaufman and Clear Channel Entertainment Motor Sports. The programme was filmed on location in the United States, with Cadman representing and presenting for the UK production throughout the American championship, culminating in the Monster Jam World Finals in Las Vegas.

== Voiceover and Commercial Work ==
Cadman also worked professionally as a voice artist, represented by Harvey Voices, recording voiceovers for commercial and broadcast work.

Her wider professional work included advertising, commercials and other recorded media alongside her television and theatre career.

== Cirque De Celebrité ==
Cadman also appeared in Sky One's Cirque de Celebrité

The programme required celebrity contestants to undertake intensive training in professional circus disciplines before performing them live. Cadman progressed through the competition to the final, with her performances including the Wheel of Death, and finished the series as runner-up.

== Theatre ==
Alongside her television work, Cadman also worked on the stage.

She played the title role in Peter Pan at the Theatre Royal, Newcastle, where her performance received positive critical attention for its energy and physicality.

She later portrayed Mandy Rice Davies in Keeler at Upstairs at the Gatehouse in London, directed by Paul Nicholas. Her performance was praised with particular attention given to her comic performance and characterisation.

Her other theatrical roles include Ella Reed in The Bed Before Yesterday at The Mill at Sonning, Wendy Darling in Amy Leach's production of Peter Pan for The Dukes, Lancaster, and a leading role in Beauty and the Beast at Chipping Norton Theatre.

Professional pantomime formed a significant part of Cadman's career from childhood onwards. Having first appeared in professional productions at the Birmingham Hippodrome as a young performer, she continued to work in major regional pantomimes throughout her career.

Her appearances included productions at the Theatre Royal, Newcastle, Victoria Theatre, Halifax, Pavilion Theatre, Worthing, and The Capitol, Horsham.

In the 2004–05 season, Cadman appeared in Hammond Productions' Cinderella at the Victoria Theatre, Halifax, where she received Hammond Productions' Best Actress award for her performance.

== Choreography and Performing Arts Education ==
Alongside her career as a performer, Cadman developed a parallel career as a choreographer and performing arts practitioner.

Cadman currently works at Hurtwood House in Surrey, where her work focuses on performing arts progression and supporting students pursuing professional and vocational training in acting, musical theatre, dance, screen performance and related disciplines.

Birmingham Stage School lists Cadman among its professional alumni.

== Personal life ==
Cadman lives in Surrey with her husband and their two children.

== Filmography ==
- Casualty
- Blessed
- Love Soup
- Mile High
- Cavegirl
- Cirque de Celebrite
