= Jessica Oyelowo =

British actress

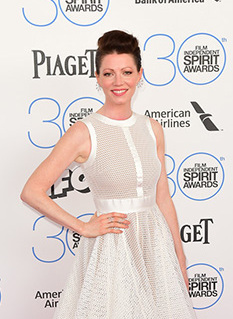
- Oyelowo in 2015
- Born: Jessica Watson; 24 December 1978 (age 47); Ipswich, Suffolk, England
- Occupations: Actress, singer
- Years active: 1999–present
- Spouse: David Oyelowo (m. 1998)
- Children: 4

Jessica Oyelowo (née Watson; born 1978) is a British-American actress and singer.

== Early life ==
She was born Jessica Watson in Ipswich, and spent her childhood in Woodbridge, Suffolk. She attended Woodbridge School as a child and was a member of the National Youth Music Theatre.

== Career ==
In 2006, she starred as Detective Sergeant Alex Jones in Mayo, then went on to appear in Murphy's Law alongside James Nesbitt, in 2007. She provided the voice of Mrs. Equiano (alongside her husband as Olaudah Equiano) in Grace Unshackled – The Olaudah Equiano Story (a radio play adapting Equiano's 1789 autobiography The Interesting Narrative of the Life of Olaudah Equiano), first broadcast on BBC 7 on 8 April 2007.

== Personal life ==
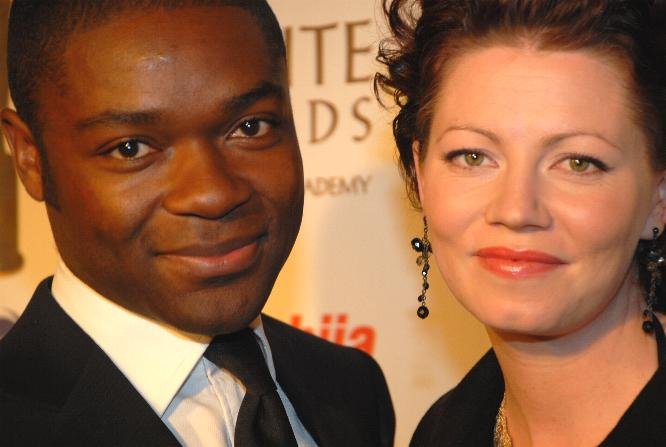
David and Jessica Oyelowo

Oyelowo resides in Tarzana in the San Fernando Valley in Southern California, US with her husband, actor David Oyelowo. They met while attending the London Academy of Music and Dramatic Art. They have four children. They formerly resided in Brighton, England.

Both she and her husband are committed Christians.

Oyelowo and her husband became naturalised US citizens on 20 July 2016.

As the wife of a Yoruba tribal prince, Oyelowo is entitled to the honorific style Olori. She currently does not use it.

== Filmography ==
=== Film ===
Year	Title	Role	Notes
1999	Sleepy Hollow	Sarah	
2004	Churchill: The Hollywood Years	Princess Margaret	
2005	It's a Boy!	Mary	Video short
2009	Big Guy	Bear Vendor	Short
2010	Alice in Wonderland	Woman with Large Poitrine in Red Queen Court	
2011	Rahab	Rahab	Short
2015	Captive	Meredith MacKenzie	
2016	After the Storm	None	Short; director, writer and producer
2016	Nina	Nurse	
2016	A United Kingdom	Lady Lilly Canning	
2019	Sorry, Not Sorry	Abby	Short
2020	The Water Man	Missus Bakemeyer	Also composed and performed several songs

=== Television ===
Year	Title	Role	Notes
1999	Unfinished Business	Flora	Episodes: "2.4", "2.6"
1999	People Like Us	Emma	Episode: "The Photographer"
2000	Madame Bovary	Felicite	TV miniseries
2000	Reach for the Moon	Claire Jones	Episode: "This Means Nothing to Me"
2000	Don Quixote	1st Handmaiden	TV film
2000	The Sight	Isobel	TV film
2001	Lee Evans: So What Now?		Episode: "Swinger"
2002	Helen West	Rose Darvey	Episodes: "Deep Sleep", "Shadow Play"
2003	The Deal	Make-up Artist	TV film
2004	Hex	Rachel McBain	Episode: "Pilot: The Story Begins"
2006	Mayo	Alex Jones	Main role
2007	Murphy's Law	Jackie Cole	Episodes: "Food Chain: Parts 1-3"
2008	Inseparable	Camille Hutton	TV film
2011	Off the Map	Chloe	Episode: "Smile. Don't Kill Anyone."
2012	Childrens Hospital	Mother	Episode: "British Hospital"
2023	Lawmen: Bass Reeves	Rachel Reeves	Episode: "Part I"; also Executive Producer

== Stage work ==
- Cyrano de Bergerac (as Roxanne) at the Royal Exchange, Manchester, 2006
- Ana in Love (play) at Hackney Empire for Inside Intelligence 2007
- As You Like It (Rosalind) for Inside Intelligence 1997, her professional debut
