= Rocket Man (TV series) =

2005 British TV drama series

- Genre: Comedy drama; Family drama
- Written by: Alison Hume
- Directed by: Jon East; Jane Prowse; James Strong
- Starring: Robson Green; Charles Dale; John Rhys Halliwell; Lucy Evans; Kai Owen; Janine Wood; Alison Newman; Kay Bridgeman; Dave Hill; Philip Whitchurch; Marcus Smith
- Opening theme: "Rocket Man", by Elton John
- Composer: The Insects
- Country of origin: United Kingdom
- Original language: English
- No. of series: 1
- No. of episodes: 6

Production
- Executive producers: Sandra Jobling; Rob Pursey
- Producer: Philip Leach
- Production locations: Filmed in Druridge Bay, Northumberland; Set in fictional Tonglas, Newport, Wales
- Editors: Martin Sharpe; Liz Webber
- Running time: 60 mins
- Production companies: British Broadcasting Corporation (BBC); Rocketman Productions Ltd. Touchpaper Television

Original release
- Network: BBC One
- Release: 30 October – 4 December 2005

Rocket Man is a BBC television drama series produced in 2005 by Philip Leach, about a recently widowed Welsh man who is struggling to build a rocket in which to launch his wife's ashes into space while raising his two children. It was created by Alison Hume, directed by Jon East (episodes 1 and 2), Jane Prowse (episodes 3 and 4) and James Strong (episodes 5 and 6), and stars Robson Green, Charles Dale, John Rhys Halliwell and Lucy Evans, with Alison Newman, Janine Wood, Kay Bridgeman, Kai Owen, Dave Hill, Philip Whitchurch and Marcus Smith in supporting roles, among others. The six hour-long episodes in the series were set in coastal Wales, in a town devastated by the closure of the local carriage works though filmed in Druridge Bay, Northumberland. According to the sign on the local chocolate bonbon factory appearing in Episode 1 where George, Barney, Diane et al. work, the exact location where the set is (fictional) Tonglas, in Newport.

== Cast ==
- Robson Green as George Stevenson, dyslexic widower and single parent
- Charles Dale as Barney Scott, George's best buddy and co-worker at the chocolate factory
- John Rhys Halliwell as Tom Stevenson, George's eight-year-old son
- Lucy Evans as Angela Stevenson, George's teenage daughter
- Kai Owen as David 'Shiner' Owen, security guard and another of George's mates
- Dave Hill as Huw Masters, another of George's friends
- Alison Newman as Diane Scott, Barney's wife
- Janine Wood as Mary Hughes, patent officer, former designer at the carriage works and George's love interest
- Philip Whitchurch as Lloyd Edwards, owner of the local scrapyard
- Kay Bridgeman as Pam Tomlyn, special needs co-ordinator / social worker at Tom's school
- Marcus Smith as Ed Fernandez, Angela's love interest
- Maureen Bennett as Barbara Masters, Huw's wife
