= Dis/Connected =

Dis/Connected is a BBC Three drama pilot, written by Howard Overman. It starred Holliday Grainger, Cloudia Swann, Aml Ameen, Bradley James, Laura Aikman, Katrina Rafferty and Lucy Evans.

== Outline ==
Dis/Connected tells the story of a group of disconnected college-going teenagers from different backgrounds who are forced to re-examine their lives after Jenny, a mutual friend of theirs, takes her own life. Sophie dropped Jenny when she got in with a popular crowd; Anthony is the kid from the wrong side of the tracks who called the ambulance that fateful night; Ben is Jenny's ex who cheated on her; Emily was too busy partying to bother with Jenny's moods.

=== Postponement ===
Dis/Connected was originally scheduled to be screened on Monday, 25 February 2008, but the BBC decided to postpone it until Monday, 31 March 2008 because up to 17 teenagers had committed suicide in South Wales during the previous year.

== Cast ==
- Laura Aikman ... Paula
- Aml Ameen ... Anthony
- Daniel Anthony ... Kez
- Liz Cass ... Chloe
- Ben Davies ... Josh
- Hannah Donaldson ... Holly
- Lucy Evans ... Natasha
- Caroline Faber ... Sandra
- Meryl Fernandes ... Sara
- Holliday Grainger ... Jenny
- Bradley James ... Ben
- Richard Lumsden ... David
- Janet Montgomery ... Lucy
- Dominique Moore ... Emily
- Wayne Powerdavis ... Jason
- Sakuntala Ramanee ... Trisha
- Kyle Redmond-Jones ... Oliver
- Cloudia Swann ... Sophie
