= Jo-Anne Knowles =

English actress

Jo-Anne Knowles (born in Oldham, Lancashire) is an English actress.

Having started acting at the age of 11, she has appeared in many major soaps, including ITV's Emmerdale and Coronation Street, BBC One's EastEnders and Doctors, and Channel 4's Brookside and Hollyoaks. She is best known for playing Janis Steel in Sky1's Mile High and Fanny Tickler in Channel 4's Phoenix Nights. She has played recurring roles in The Bill, and Waterloo Road, has had many guest roles in Holby City and Casualty and was in two episodes of the BBC mini-series Moving On. She has also played Mina Van Helsing in the popular CBBC series Young Dracula.

She is married and lives in London. She gave birth to a daughter in 2010.

== Filmography ==
Year	Title	Type	Role	Notes
1984	Juliet Bravo	TV	Judith Trevor	1 Episode
1984–1985	Brookside	TV	Jessica Haynes	4 episodes
1988	How To Be Cool	TV	Secretary	1 Episode
1991, 2006–2007	The Bill	TV	Nurse / Mia Perry	23 episodes
1994, 2002	Emmerdale	TV	Kaye Mannerson / Sally	3 episodes
1995	Hollyoaks	TV	Lorraine Wilson	
1995, 1996, 1999, 2001, 2017	Coronation Street	TV	Nursing Sister / Gilly Saunders / Mrs Hardy / DC Ann Short / Chloe Tipton	
1999	City Central	TV	Ms. Jenkins	1 Episode
1999	Cold Feet	TV	Amanda	1 Episode
1999	Extremely Dangerous	TV	Nurse	1 Episode
2001	The Parole Officer	Movie	TV Interviewer	
2002	Barbara	TV	Wendy	1 Episode
2002	Phoenix Nights	TV	Fanny	2 episodes
2002	Fat Friends	TV	Suzanne Ellis	1 Episode
2003	Dream Team	TV	Lia Smith	1 Episode
2003	EastEnders	TV	Paula	1 Episode
2003	Sweet Medicine	TV	Sheena Mason	1 Episode
2003–2005	Mile High	TV	Janis Steel	37 episodes
2004	The Last Detective	TV	Pippa Sterling	1 Episode
2004	Murder in Suburbia	TV	Lisa West	1 Episode
2004	Can't Buy Me Love	TV movie	Gilly Thwaite	
2005, 2011, 2015	Holby City	TV	Geraldine Flowers / Kate Devis / Lindsay Carroll	3 episodes
2006, 2007, 2011, 2012, 2014	Doctors	TV	DCI Claire Dawson / Phillipa Grove / Jean Steel / Annie Harris	8 episodes
2007	Casualty	TV	Fay Balch	1 Episode
2007–2012	Young Dracula	TV	Mina van Helsing	14 episodes
2009	W.M.D		Karen Morgan	
2009, 2013	Moving On	TV	Lisa / Maria	2 episodes
2011–2012	Waterloo Road	TV	Rosie Matthews	5 episodes
2013	The Mimic	TV	Naomi	1 Episode
2015	Hetty Feather	TV	Annie Bottomly	1 Episode
