= Adam Sinclair (actor) =

Scottish actor (born 1977)

- Born: 18 April 1977 (age 49); East Kilbride, Scotland, United Kingdom
- Occupation: Actor
- Years active: 1999–present
- Known for: Kent Drake (Rizzoli & Isles)
- Spouse: Michelle Kath (m. 2004)
- Children: 2
- Relatives: Sarah Sutherland (half-sister-in-law); Terry Kath (father-in-law)

Adam Sinclair (born 18 April 1977) is a Scottish actor. He is best known for his role as Jason Jackson in Boyz Unlimited, starred in the television series Mile High and 24: Live Another Day, and has appeared in supporting roles in films like Van Wilder 2: The Rise of Taj.

== Personal life ==
Sinclair is originally from East Kilbride, Scotland. He met his wife, Michelle Kath, in Hawaii while working on the set of To End All Wars. Michelle is the daughter of Terry Kath, a founding member of the rock band Chicago, former stepdaughter of actor Kiefer Sutherland, and older half-sister of Sarah Sutherland.

== Selected filmography ==
- Boyz Unlimited as Jason Jackson (1999)
- To End All Wars as John (2001)
- Hollyoaks: Movin' On as Jake (2001)
- As If as Dan Parker (11 episodes, 2001–2002)
- Mile High as Will O'Brien (38 episodes, 2003–2005)
- Holby City as Alan Thomas (2005)
- Nina's Heavenly Delights as Fish (2006)
- Van Wilder 2: The Rise of Taj as Lord Wrightwood (2006)
- Painkiller Jane as Nightclub Owner (2007)
- The Summit as Wilcox (2008)
- The Day of the Triffids as Ashdown (2009)
- Irvine Welsh's Ecstasy as Lloyd Buist (2011)
- Lip Service as Dr. Declan Love (2012)
- Reel Life as Oliver Hargrove (2013)
- 24: Live Another Day as Gavin Leonard (6 episodes, 2014)
- Rizzoli & Isles as Kent Drake (23 episodes, 2015–2016)
- Alien Harvest as Alec (2019)
- Gifted as Angus (9 episodes, 2025)
