= Naomi Ryan =

British actress

Naomi Ryan (born 24 May 1977 in Bournemouth, England) is a British actress who has appeared in Dream Team as Ashleigh King, Mile High as Lehann Evans and Coronation Street where she played Underworld factory worker Bobbi Lewis.

== Filmography ==
- 2000-2002: Coronation Street (TV series; played in 134 episodes)
- 2005: Holby City (TV series; played in 1 episode)
- 2003-2005: Mile High (TV series; played in 39 episodes)
- 2005-2006: Dream Team (TV series; played in 39 episodes)
- 2007: Weekends in Brooklyn
- 2008: Echo Beach (TV series; played in 12 episodes; role: the character Jacqui Hughes.)
- April 2009: The Bill (TV series; played in 6 episodes; role: Becky James, a teacher.)
- July 2007-2009: EastEnders (TV series; played in 4 episodes; role: a policewoman)
- September 2011: Ryan starred in the New Autumn TK Maxx Television Advert
- September 2012: Doctor Who (TV series; played in "Asylum of the Daleks")
- 2008-2013: Doctors (TV series; played in 4 episodes)
- 2014: Guardians of the Galaxy
- 2014: Honeytrap
- 2015: Mr Selfridge (TV series; 10 episodes)
- 2015: The C Word
- 2015: From Darkness (TV series; 2 episodes)
- 2015: The Coroner (TV series; 1 episode)
- 2015: Hard Time Bus
- 2016: Motherland
- 2016: Guilt (TV series; 10 episodes)
- 2017: Still Star Crossed (TV series; 1 episode)
