= Upside Down (group) =

English boy band

- Origin: London, England
- Genres: Pop, dance
- Years active: 1995–1997
- Labels: World Records
- Past members: Giles Kristian; Chris Leng; Jamie Browne; Richard Micallef

Upside Down were an English boy band which consisted of Chris Leng, Giles Kristian, Jamie Browne and Richard Micallef. The formation of the group was featured in the late night BBC Television documentary series, Inside Story.

The group was developed by World Records, an independent record label who had staked everything on the success of their act. Their first single, "Change Your Mind", was written for fellow 1990s boy band Bad Boys Inc and, following the broadcast of the Inside Story documentary, it jumped from No. 35 to No. 12 in the charts, peaking at No. 11 a week later. After four hit singles, World Records went into bankruptcy and Upside Down re-grouped as Orange Orange with no further success. Kristian went on to be a bestselling author of historical fiction.

They appeared on BBC's Top of The Pops in 1996.

== Discography ==
=== Singles ===
As Upside Down

- "Change Your Mind" (1996), World Records - No. 11 UK
- "Every Time I Fall in Love" (1996), World Records - No. 18 UK
- "Never Found a Love Like This Before" (1996), World Records - No. 19 UK
- "If You Leave Me Now" (1996), World Records - No. 27 UK

As Orange Orange

- "Beautiful Day" (1997), Blue Cherry/Big Banana's - No. 83 UK
