= Alex Ward =

Alex or Alexander Ward may refer to:

- Alexander Ward (barrister) (born 1963), Australian barrister and naval officer
- Alex Ward (musician) (born 1974), British clarinetist, guitarist and composer
- Alexander Ward (born 1990), English tennis player
- Alex Ward (American football) (born 1999), American football long snapper
- Alex Ward, guitarist of American band The Flying Luttenbachers
