= Empire Design =

British film promotion agency

Empire Design is a British film promotion agency founded by Stephen Burdge in 1996. The company has offices in London and New York, and specialises in creating print and audiovisual film campaigns for the UK and International film markets.

Clients include motion picture studios such as Universal Pictures, Disney/20th Century Studios, Sony Pictures, Paramount, and Working Title Films.

== History ==
Established in 1996, Empire Design's early work included poster campaigns for movies such as Toy Story, Trainspotting and 12 Monkeys. In 2001, the company moved to its current location on Queen Anne Street, London. In 2002, Empire Design expanded into AV, and began making trailers, promos, television spots, radio spots and online and digital spots. Empire Design's trailers include Shaun Of The Dead, House of Flying Daggers, The Bourne Ultimatum, and Skyfall. In 2006, Empire Design opened an office on Elizabeth Street in New York's Lower East Side, and began creating domestic US campaigns for American television drama series including Mad Men and The Walking Dead. Empire Design has won several Golden Trailer Awards.

== Notable Campaigns ==
- Trainspotting
- Kill Bill Volume 1
- Kill Bill Volume 2
- Sexy Beast
- Lock, Stock and Two Smoking Barrels
- House Of Flying Daggers
- Shaun Of The Dead
- The Bourne Supremacy
- The Bourne Ultimatum
- Toy Story 2
- Casino Royale
- Quantum Of Solace
- Skyfall
