= Mile High (TV series) =

Television series

- Series one titles
- Genre: Drama
- Created by: Hewland International
- Developed by: Sky Television
- Written by: Jane Hewland; Cameron McAllister
- Directed by: Various
- Starring: Various
- Opening theme: "The World Is Mine" by Hooverphonic
- Composer: Hooverphonic
- Country of origin: United Kingdom
- Original language: English
- No. of series: 2
- No. of episodes: 39 (list of episodes)

Production
- Producer: Various
- Production location: Various
- Running time: 49 minutes (approx.)

Original release
- Network: Sky1
- Release: 16 February 2003 – 20 July 2005

Related
- Dream Team

Mile High is a British television drama based on the lives of the cabin crew members of Fresh!, a budget airline based in London. The name of the show is a reference to the Mile High Club. The show was broadcast on Sky1 from 2003 to 2005 and then aired again on Sky Three. In 2012, CBS Drama obtained the rights to the series.

== Background ==
A Hewland International production, Mile High is a mix of drama, sex and comedy. The show is based around the flight crew of a young budget airline, in and out of uniform, in the air and on the ground. The series follows the flight crew as they travel and live in the London home they share.

== Cancellation ==
In August 2005, shortly after the series two finale, Sky 1's controller announced that the show would not return for a third series.

In an interview with Digital Spy, executive producer and creator Jane Hewland said, "Then finally, to make things worse, the policy at Sky changed 180 degrees right as we were in the middle of the 19 ep series. The previous boss had been pushing us to be more sexually explicit. That was the message. Sky had had lots of programmes like Naked in Westminster and Ibiza Uncovered which had done very well by being quite raunchy. Suddenly that went out of fashion. This wasn't anyone's fault. Times just change. I don't think the audience was ever comfortable with the more explicit things we did. It's not what people want in their living rooms. But the whole show got branded as tacky – the title MILE HIGH does encourage that. By now everybody but us had lost faith. I really enjoyed making the final episodes. I thought we'd come back and found our way again. But creatively I was knackered from having had to produce 58 hours of drama in a single year."

== Filming locations ==
Although the airline flies all over the world, the show was filmed in two airports: London Stansted Airport and the Palma de Mallorca Airport. Also used in filming on location were London and Spain.

Scenes featuring the 'fresh centre' and the airport check-in desks were filmed at the ExCeL London centre on custom-built sets. The exteriors of the crew flat were the Clementina Court Building on Copperfield Road, Mile End, London. The interiors and balcony scenes were filmed at 3 Mills Studios in West Ham, London.

== Airline ==
Mile High revolves around a fictional budget airline, Fresh!, that operates Boeing 737 aircraft to destinations across Europe and North Africa.

In series 2, Fresh! merges with long-haul airline Goldstar resulting in two subsidiaries – Fresh! Europe and Fresh! Global which operates a Boeing 747-200. The merger causes distress to workers, especially those from Goldstar. The original blue Fresh! uniform is retained for all crew, rather than the Goldstar crew's mustard colour uniforms.

The airline's main base is London Stansted Airport, sometimes referred to as London Airport, where the airport's external and interior shots are filmed. Other destinations mentioned in the series include Leeds Bradford, Belfast, Manchester, Cardiff, Edinburgh, and Newcastle domestically. Internationally, destinations include Palma de Majorca, Amsterdam, Paris, Split, Brussels, Helsinki, Kos, Alicante, Faro, Málaga, Milan and Monastir. Destinations incorporated after the merger with Goldstar include Toronto, Dubai and Bahrain.

== Episodes ==
Series one consisted of 13 episodes. Series two consisted of 7 episodes followed by 19 in series three.

Series two was the shortest series due to a compressed time scale for filming. Series two was a major success and as a result a further series of 19 episodes was commissioned. Episodes 14–20 and 21–39 were shown in four separate batches. Although episodes 21–39 were commissioned as a third series, episodes 14–20 and 21–39 were combined to create one large series classified as series two.

Charlotte Taylor (Sarah Farooqui) departed after series two, causing her character to disappear without explanation in series three when it was combined with series two. This is one major difference between the series.

=== Series one (2003) ===
Series one follows the lives of Emma Coyle (Emma Ferguson), K.C Gregory (Sarah Manners), Jason Murdoch (James Redmond), John Bryson (Matthew Chambers), Janis Steel (Jo-Anne Knowles), Lehan Evans (Naomi Ryan), Marco Bailey (Tom Wisdom) and Will O'Brien (Adam Sinclair). The main storyline for series one is the love triangle between Emma Coyle, John Bryson and Emma's husband Ian. In episode one it is the eve of Emma's wedding day and she has a one-night stand with John. Later in the series it is revealed that Emma is pregnant with John's baby whilst married to Ian. Janis reveals the truth to Ian causing their marriage to end and Emma to have a breakdown. Another major storyline in this series is the complicated relationship between Janis and Marco.

The characters Jason Murdoch, K.C Gregory, Emma Coyle and John Bryson depart the show at the end of this series.

=== Series two (2004–2005) ===
Series two introduces Poppy Fields (Stacey Cadman), Jack Fields (John Pickard), Charlotte Taylor, Nigel Croker (Christopher Villiers), Lorna Newbold, Rachel Potter, Dan Peterson (Luke Roberts) and Ed Russel (Scott Adkins) to the show. Janis Steel (Jo-Anne Knowles), Lehan Evans (Naomi Ryan), Marco Bailey (Tom Wisdom) and Will O'Brien (Adam Sinclair) were the only returning cast.

The main storyline in series two is the merger between Fresh! and GoldStar. The storyline of Janis' and Marco's complicated relationship continues this series with the addition of Poppy and Nigel. Poppy is a new love interest for Marco and Nigel is a new love interest for Janis. Series two has the main storyline of Nigel and his love interests. It is revealed that Nigel is a habitual cheater and has dated many women in the time in which he was married to his wife Denise. This storyline continues throughout the series until the series finale where all his love interests get revenge.

The series finale sees some of the staff at Fresh! lose their contracts, leaving Ed and Poppy out of a job. The series finale also shows Lehan Evans (Naomi Ryan) dying in a plane crash caused by Nigel's heart attack upon landing. As a result of his girlfriend's death, Dan Peterson descends into alcoholism. Ed and Poppy move to Minsk, Belarus and have a child. Janis Steel and Will O'Brien leave the airline to open their own bar named 'Mile High' on a Spanish beach.

The last episodes of the second season were broadcast on Finnish station MTV3 before British channel Sky One aired them.

== Cast ==
=== Main characters ===
| Character | Actor | Role | Series |
|---|---|---|---|
| Emma Coyle | Emma Ferguson | Cabin Crew | 1 |
| Katherine Cassandra "K.C." Gregory | Sarah Manners | Cabin Crew | 1 |
| Jason Murdoch | James Redmond | Cabin Crew | 1 |
| John Bryson | Matthew Chambers | First Officer | 1 |
| Janis Steel | Jo-Anne Knowles | Senior Purser | 1–2 |
| Lehann Evans | Naomi Ryan | Cabin Crew (Series 1), Purser (Series 2) | 1–2 |
| Marco Bailey | Tom Wisdom | Cabin Crew | 1–2 |
| Will O'Brien | Adam Sinclair | Cabin Crew (Series 1), Purser (Series 2) | 1–2 |
| Poppy Fields | Stacey Cadman | Cabin Crew | 2 |
| Captain Nigel Croker | Christopher Villiers | Captain | 2 |
| Charlotte Taylor | Sarah Farooqui | Cabin Crew | 2 |
| Jack Fields | John Pickard | Cabin Crew | 2 |
| Rachel Potter | Emma-Jane Portch | Cabin Crew | 2 |
| Lorna Newbold | Katy Edwards | Cabin Crew | 2 |
| Dan Peterson | Luke Roberts | First Officer | 2 |
| Ed Russell | Scott Adkins | Cabin Crew | 2 |

=== Recurring cast ===
| Character | Actor | Series |
|---|---|---|
| Richard Beardsley | Tim Crouch | 1 |
| Ian | Peter Collins | 1 |
| Marco's Mum | Heather Tobias | 1 |
| James Motherbaugh | Martin Cole | 1 |
| Jackie Randall | Sarah Matravers | 1–2 |
| Kevin McMillian | Charles Daish | 1–2 |
| Captain Robyn Palmer | Georgia Zaris | 1–2 |
| Marvin Lloyd | Kal Weber | 2 |
| Lucy Collins | Emma Willis | 2 |
| Denise Croker | Alison King | 2 |
| Terri | Debbie Chazen | 2 |
| Connor | Connor Fletcher | 1 |
| Eloise | Nichola Theobald (uncredited) | 2 |

=== Guest characters ===
| Character | Actor | Series |
|---|---|---|
| Crazy Rugby Fan | Ross O'Hennessy | 1 |

== Home media ==
- Series one, two, and the complete series are available in the UK.
- The complete season one seven-disc boxset was released in Australia on Region 4 DVD in November 2006. The complete season two boxset was released on 21 March 2007.
- Season one 1 was released in the US by Koch Vision on 13 March 2007, with season two volumes 1 and 2 being released later in 2007.

Unlike the broadcasts, the DVD episodes do not include recaps of the storyline and the music is replaced by a different soundtrack.

== Theme song ==
- Mile High's theme song is "The World Is Mine" by Belgian band Hooverphonic.
