= Nichola Theobald =

British actress

- Born: Nichola Jane Theobald
- Occupations: Hair artist; makeup artist; actress; presenter; fashion model

Nichola Jane "Nikki" Theobald is an English hair and makeup artist, former film, television and voice-over actress, former television presenter and former fashion model.

== Career ==
Theobald began her career in the modelling industry and appeared in a campaign for French Connection and then went on to appear in editorials in magazines including Esquire and FHM.

She was one of the contestants / presenters on 'Naked Angels in Beach Paradise', a reality show based in Ibiza, Spain.

Following a second advertising campaign for French Connection, she was featured in a variety of editorials in magazines such as Men's Health, Mixmag, Front, Loaded and Zoo.

She appeared on the cover for the British feature film Triggermen which starred Pete Postlethwaite, Adrian Dunbar, Neil Morrissey, Donnie Wahlberg and Michael Rapaport.

Following this, she was invited to Italy to do an ad campaign for "Kronos" in GQ Italia.

Her television work has included appearances on John Calshaw's Big Impression, Sky One's Max Magic and the ITV gameshow Love on a Saturday Night.

She appeared in television ad campaigns, including Wrigley's Extra idents for the youth-oriented television drama Hollyoaks.

She has had speaking parts in a special television ad campaign for the special Wimbledon tennis colour supplement for the Guardian newspaper and in a commercial for Diamond Car Insurance for Girls.

Theobald has also starred in an extended series of television promotions for Sky Travel and has been the presenter of a series of infomercials for Cosmedicate and Lynnergy.

=== Voice-over roles ===
Voice-over roles include radio promotions for Sky Travel, Top Up TV and narration for a series of audiobooks of children's stories.

=== Television roles ===
Theobald's television acting credits include: Eloise in TV series Mile High (a role she was officially uncredited for), Emma Casey (the personal assistant of Eli Knox, played by Shane Lynch) in the long-running TV series Dream Team and in a 2005 episode of the BBC children's show The Basil Brush Show as Nell McMuffin, a glamour model who takes part in a reality TV show entitled "Celebrity Bushwhack", a parody of the long-running ITV reality series I'm a Celebrity...Get Me Out of Here!. McMuffin herself is loosely based on Nell McAndrew, who took part in the first series of I'm a Celebrity...Get Me Out of Here in 2002.

Her most significant role to date was as Sherry, the personal assistant to a London vice-lord played by Colin Salmon in the television miniseries Trial & Retribution VIII : Blue Eiderdown.

In 2006 she appeared regularly as a live interactive TV presenter for a dating show called Text2Date and as one of the hosts of the interactive gameshow Quizworld for SmileTV.

In 2007, she played Nurse Roberts in the Channel 4 soap Hollyoaks.

In March 2010, Theobald appeared in an episode of the BBC soap opera EastEnders, playing Bev, who (along with her friend Debs), unsuccessfully attempts to chat-up established characters Phil Mitchell and Minty Peterson.

== Other ventures ==
Theobald retried from acting in the mid 2010s and has since become a hair and makeup artist.
