= List of European Academy Award winners and nominees =

This is a list of European Academy Award winners and nominees, which includes people born and/or raised in Europe and people born outside of Europe who are citizens of European countries.

== Best Picture ==
Best Picture
Year	Name	Country	Film	Status	Milestone / Notes
1938	Réalisation d'art cinématographique	(France)	Grand Illusion	Nominated	
1940	Charles Chaplin Productions	(United Kingdom)	The Great Dictator	Nominated	
1941	Joseph L. Mankiewicz	(Germany)	The Philadelphia Story	Nominated	
1943	Two Cities Films	(United Kingdom)	In Which We Serve	Nominated	
1946	Two Cities Films	(United Kingdom)	Henry V	Nominated	
1947	J. Arthur Rank-Cineguild	(United Kingdom)	Great Expectations	Nominated	
1948	J. Arthur Rank-Two Cities Films	(United Kingdom)	Hamlet	Won	
1948	J. Arthur Rank-Archers	(United Kingdom)	The Red Shoes	Nominated	
1951	Anatole Litvak	(Ukraine) / (Lithuania)	Decision Before Dawn	Nominated	
1951	Sam Zimbalist	(Ukraine)	Quo Vadis	Nominated	
1952	John Woolf and James Woolf	(United Kingdom)	Moulin Rouge	Nominated	
1952	Robert Riskin	(Russia)	Here Comes The Groom	Nominated	
1953	John Houseman	(Romania) / (United Kingdom)	Julius Caesar	Nominated	
1953	William Wyler	(Switzerland) / (Germany)	Roman Holiday	Nominated	
1954	Sam Spiegel	(Austria-Hungary)	On the Waterfront	Won	
1956	William Wyler	(Switzerland) / (Germany)	Friendly Persuasion	Nominated	
1957	Sam Spiegel	(Austria-Hungary)	The Bridge on the River Kwai	Won	
1959	Sam Zimbalist	(Ukraine)	Ben-Hur	Won	
1959	Otto Preminger	(Austria)	Anatomy of a Murder	Nominated	
1959	Henry Blanke	(Germany)	The Nun's Story	Nominated	
1959	John Woolf and James Woolf	(United Kingdom)	Room at the Top	Nominated	
1960	Billy Wilder	(Austria)	The Apartment	Won	
1960	Fred Zinnemann	(Austria)	The Sundowners	Nominated	
1962	Sam Spiegel	(Austria-Hungary)	Lawrence of Arabia	Won	
1963	Tony Richardson	(United Kingdom)	Tom Jones	Won	
1963	Elia Kazan	(Ottoman Empire) / (Greece)	America America	Nominated	
1964	Michael Cacoyannis	(Cyprus) / (Greece)	Zorba the Greek	Nominated	
1965	Joseph Janni	(Italy) / (United Kingdom)	Darling	Nominated	
1965	Carlo Ponti	(Italy)	Doctor Zhivago	Nominated	
1966	Fred Zinnemann	(Austria)	A Man For All Seasons	Won	
1966	Lewis Gilbert	(United Kingdom)	Alfie	Nominated	
1968	John Woolf	(United Kingdom)	Oliver!	Won	
1968	Anthony Havelock-Allan and John Brabourne	(United Kingdom)	Romeo and Juliet	Nominated	
1969	Jacques Perrin	(France)	Z	Nominated	
1970	Ingo Preminger	(Austria-Hungary)	MASH	Nominated	
1971	Sam Spiegel	(Austria-Hungary)	Nicholas and Alexandra	Nominated	
1972	John Boorman	(United Kingdom)	Deliverance	Nominated	
1972	Bengt Forslund	(Sweden)	The Emigrants	Nominated	
1973	Ingmar Bergman	(Sweden)	Cries and Whispers	Nominated	
1975	Martin Bergman	(United Kingdom)	Dog Day Afternoon	Nominated	
1978	Barry Spikings, Michael Deeley and John Peverall	(United Kingdom)	The Deer Hunter	Won	
1978	Alan Marshall and David Puttnam	(United Kingdom)	Midnight Express	Nominated	
1979	Peter Yates	(United Kingdom)	Breaking Away	Nominated	
1980	Claude Berri and Timothy Burrill	(France) / (United Kingdom)	Tess	Nominated	
1981	David Puttnam	(United Kingdom)	Chariots of Fire	Won	
1982	Richard Attenborough	(United Kingdom)	Gandhi	Won	
1983	Peter Yates	(United Kingdom)	The Dresser	Nominated	
1984	David Puttnam	(United Kingdom)	The Killing Fields	Nominated	
1984	John Bradbourne	(United Kingdom)	A Passage to India	Nominated	
1986	Fernando Ghia and David Puttnam	(Italy) / (United Kingdom)	The Mission	Nominated	
1987	Jeremy Thomas	(United Kingdom)	The Last Emperor	Won	
1987	John Boorman	(United Kingdom)	Hope and Glory	Nominated	
1988	Norma Heyman	(United Kingdom)	Dangerous Liaisons	Nominated	
1989	Noel Pearson	(Republic of Ireland)	My Left Foot	Nominated	
1992	Stephen Woolley	(United Kingdom)	The Crying Game	Nominated	
1993	Branko Lustig	(Croatia)	Schindler's List	Won	
1993	Jim Sheridan	(Republic of Ireland)	In the Name of the Father	Nominated	
1994	Duncan Kenworthy	(United Kingdom)	Four Weddings and a Funeral	Nominated	
1995	Mario Cecchi Gori, Vittorio Cecchi Gori and Gaetano Daniele	(Italy)	Il Postino: The Postman	Nominated	
1996	Simon Channing Williams	(United Kingdom)	Secrets & Lies	Nominated	
1996	Jane Scott	(United Kingdom)	Shine	Nominated	
1997	Uberto Pasolini	(Italy)	The Full Monty	Nominated	
1998	David Parfitt	(United Kingdom)	Shakespeare in Love	Won	
1998	Alison Owen, Eric Fellner and Tim Bevan	(United Kingdom)	Elizabeth	Nominated	
1998	Elda Ferri and Gianluigi Braschi	(Italy)	Life is Beautiful	Nominated	
1998	Ian Bryce	(United Kingdom)	Saving Private Ryan	Nominated	
1999	Frank Darabont	(Hungary)	The Green Mile	Nominated	
1999	Pieter Jan Brugge	(Netherlands)	The Insider	Nominated	
2000	Branko Lustig	(Croatia)	Gladiator	Won	
2002	Alberto Grimaldi	(Italy)	Gangs of New York	Nominated	
2002	Robert Fox	(United Kingdom)	The Hours	Nominated	
2002	Roman Polanski, Robert Benmussa and Alain Sarde	(France) / (Poland)	The Pianist	Nominated	
2004	Graham King	(United Kingdom)	The Aviator	Nominated	
2005	Michael Ohoven	(Germany)	Capote	Nominated	
2005	Diana Ossana	(Italy)	Brokeback Mountain	Nominated	
2006	Graham King	(United Kingdom)	The Departed	Won	
2006	Andy Harries, Christine Langan and Tracey Seaward	(United Kingdom)	The Queen	Nominated	
2007	Tim Bevan, Eric Fellner and Paul Webster	(United Kingdom)	Atonement	Nominated	
2007	Paul Thomas Anderson, Daniel Lupi and JoAnne Sellar	(United Kingdom)	There Will Be Blood	Nominated	
2008	Christian Colson	(United Kingdom)	Slumdog Millionaire	Won	
2008	Eric Fellner	(United Kingdom)	Frost/Nixon	Nominated	
2008	Anthony Minghella and Redmond Morris	(United Kingdom) / (Republic of Ireland)	The Reader	Nominated	
2009	Amanda Posey	(United Kingdom)	An Education	Nominated	
2010	Iain Canning and Gareth Unwin	(United Kingdom)	The King's Speech	Won	
2010	Danny Boyle, John Smithson and Christian Colson	(United Kingdom)	127 Hours	Nominated	
2010	Christopher Nolan and Emma Thomas	(United Kingdom)	Inception	Nominated	
2011	Thomas Langmann	(France)	The Artist	Won	
2011	Graham King and Martin Scorsese	(United Kingdom) (Italy)	Hugo	Nominated	
2012	George Clooney	(France) / (United States)	Argo	Won	
2012	Margaret Menegoz, Stefan Arndt, Veit Heiduschka and Michael Katz	(France) / (Germany) / (Austria) / (Hungary)	Amour	Nominated	
2012	Tim Bevan, Eric Fellner, Debra Hayward and Cameron Mackintosh	(United Kingdom)	Les Misérables	Nominated	
2013	Steve McQueen	(United Kingdom)	12 Years a Slave	Won	
2013	Martin Scorsese	(Italy)	The Wolf of Wall Street	Nominated	
2013	David Heyman	(United Kingdom)	Gravity	Nominated	
2013	Gabrielle Tana, Steve Coogan and Tracey Seaward	(United Kingdom)	Philomena	Nominated	
2014	Christian Colson	(United Kingdom)	Selma	Nominated	
2014	Tim Bevan and Eric Fellner	(United Kingdom)	The Theory of Everything	Nominated	
2015	Amanda Posey	(United Kingdom)	Brooklyn	Nominated	
2015	Simon Kinberg, Ridley Scott, Michael Schaefer and Mark Huffam	(United Kingdom) / (Germany)	The Martian	Nominated	
2015	Ed Guiney	(Republic of Ireland)	Room	Nominated	
2016	Iain Canning	(United Kingdom)	Lion	Nominated	
2017	Luca Guadagnino, Emilie Georges and Marco Morabito	(Italy) / (France)	Call Me By Your Name	Nominated	
2017	Tim Bevan and Eric Fellner	(United Kingdom)	Darkest Hour	Nominated	
2017	Emma Thomas and Christopher Nolan	(United Kingdom)	Dunkirk	Nominated	
2017	JoAnne Sellar and Daniel Lupi	(United Kingdom)	Phantom Thread	Nominated	
2017	Graham Broadbent, Pete Czernin and Martin McDonagh	(United Kingdom) / (Republic of Ireland)	Three Billboards Outside Ebbing, Missouri	Nominated	
2018	Graham King	(United Kingdom)	Bohemian Rhapsody	Nominated	
2018	Ed Guiney, Lee Magiday and Yorgos Lanthimos	(Republic of Ireland) / (United Kingdom) / (Greece)	The Favorite	Nominated	
2019	David Heyman	(United Kingdom)	Marriage Story	Nominated	
2019	Sam Mendes and Pippa Harris	(United Kingdom)	1917	Nominated	
2019	David Heyman	(United Kingdom)	Once Upon a Time in Hollywood	Nominated	
2019	Martin Scorsese and Robert De Niro	(Italy) / (United States)	The Irishman	Nominated	
2020/2021	David Parfitt, Jean-Louis Livi, and Philippe Carcassonne	(United Kingdom) / (France)	The Father	Nominated	
2020/2021	Emerald Fennell	(United Kingdom)	Promising Young Woman	Nominated	
2020/2021	Sacha Ben Harroche	(France)	Sound of Metal	Nominated	
2021	Philippe Rousselet, Fabrice Gianfermi	(France)	CODA	Won	
2021	Kenneth Branagh	(Republic of Ireland) / (United Kingdom)	Belfast	Nominated	
2021	Tanya Seghatchian and Iain Canning	(United Kingdom)	The Power of the Dog	Nominated	
2022	Malte Grunert	(Germany)	All Quiet on the Western Front	Nominated	
2022	Graham Broadbent, Peter Czernin and Martin McDonagh	(Republic of Ireland) / (United Kingdom)	The Banshees of Inisherin	Nominated	
2022	Erik Hemmendorff and Philippe Bober	(Sweden) / (France)	Triangle of Sadness	Nominated	
2023	David Heyman and Tom Ackeley	(United Kingdom)	Barbie	Nominated	Shared with Margot Robbie and Robbie Brenner
2023	Emma Thomas and Christopher Nolan	(United Kingdom)	Oppenheimer	Won	Shared with Charles Roven
2023	James Wilson and Ewa Puszczyńska	(United Kingdom) / (Poland)	The Zone of Interest	Nominated	
2023	Ed Guiney, Andrew Lowe, and Yorgos Lanthimos	(Republic of Ireland) / (Greece)	Poor Things	Nominated	Shared with Emma Stone
2023	Marie-Ange Luciani and David Thion	(France)	Anatomy of a Fall	Nominated	
2024	Pascal Caucheteux and Jacques Audiard	(France)	Emilia Pérez	Nominated	
2024	Tessa Ross and Juliette Howell	(United Kingdom) (England)	Conclave	Nominated	Shared with Michael A. Jackman
2025	Ed Guiney, Andrew Lowe, Yorgos Lanthimos, and Lars Knudsen	(Republic of Ireland) / (Greece) / (Denmark)	Bugonia	Nominated	Shared with Emma Stone
2025	Pippa Harris and Sam Mendes	(United Kingdom) (England)	Hamnet	Nominated	Shared with Liza Marshall, Nicolas Gonda, and Steven Spielberg
2025	Timothée Chalamet	(United States) (France)	Marty Supreme	Nominated	Shared with Eli Bush, Ronald Bronstein, Josh Safdie, and Anthony Katagas
2025	Adam Somner	(United Kingdom) (England)	One Battle After Another	Won	Posthumous nomination Shared with Sara Murphy and Paul Thomas Anderson
2025	Emilie Lesclaux	(France)	The Secret Agent	Nominated	
2025	Maria Ekerhovd and Andrea Berentsen Ottmar	(Norway)	Sentimental Value	Nominated	

== Best Director ==
Director					
Year	Name	Country	Film	Status	Notes
1927/1928	Herbert Brenon	(United Kingdom) (Republic of Ireland) (United States)	Sorrell and Son	Nominated	Born in the modern day Republic of Ireland, which was then a part of the United Kingdom of Great Britain and Ireland Became a United States citizen in 1918
1927/1928	Lewis Milestone	(Russian Empire) (United States)	Two Arabian Knights	Won	Born modern day Moldova, which was then a part of the Russian Empire Became a United States citizen in 1919
1928/1929	Frank Lloyd	(United Kingdom) (Scotland)	The Divine Lady	Won	
1928/1929	Frank Lloyd	(United Kingdom) (Scotland)	Drag; Weary River	Nominated	
1928/1929	Ernst Lubitsch	(German Empire)	The Patriot	Nominated	Born in the German Empire
1929/1930	Lewis Milestone	(Russian Empire) (United States)	All Quiet on the Western Front	Won	Born modern day Moldova, which was then a part of the Russian Empire Became a United States citizen in 1919
1929/1930	Ernst Lubitsch	(German Empire)	The Love Parade	Nominated	Born in the German Empire
1930/1931	Lewis Milestone	(Russian Empire) (United States)	The Front Page	Nominated	Born modern day Moldova, which was then a part of the Russian Empire Became a United States citizen in 1919
1930/1931	Josef von Sternberg	(Austria-Hungary) (United States)	Morocco	Nominated	Born in the Austro-Hungarian Empire Became a United States citizen in 1908
1931/1932	Josef von Sternberg	(Austria-Hungary) (United States)	Shanghai Express	Nominated	Born in the Austro-Hungarian Empire Became a United States citizen in 1908
1932/1933	Frank Lloyd	(United Kingdom) (Scotland)	Cavalcade	Won	
1932/1933	Frank Capra	(Kingdom of Italy) (United States)	Lady for a Day	Nominated	Born in the Kingdom of Italy Became a United States citizen in 1920
1934	Frank Capra	(Kingdom of Italy) (United States)	It Happened One Night	Won	Born in the Kingdom of Italy Became a United States citizen in 1920
1935	Frank Lloyd	(United Kingdom) (Scotland)	Mutiny on the Bounty	Nominated	
1935	Michael Curtiz	(Austria-Hungary) (Hungary) (United States)	Captain Blood	Nominated	Born in the Austro-Hungarian Empire to Hungarian Jewish parents Became a United States citizen in 1933
1936	Frank Capra	(Kingdom of Italy) (United States)	Mr. Deeds Goes to Town	Won	Born in the Kingdom of Italy Became a United States citizen in 1920
1936	William Wyler	(Switzerland) (German Empire) (United States)	Dodsworth	Nominated	Born in the German Empire Received Swiss citizenship from his father Became a United States citizen in 1928
1937	William Dieterle	(German Empire) (United States)	The Life of Emile Zola	Nominated	Born in the German Empire Became a United States citizen in 1937
1938	Frank Capra	(Kingdom of Italy) (United States)	You Can't Take It with You	Won	Born in the Kingdom of Italy Became a United States citizen in 1920
1938	Michael Curtiz	(Austria-Hungary) (United States)	Angels with Dirty Faces	Nominated	Born in the Austro-Hungarian Empire to a Hungarian Jewish family Became a United States citizen in 1933
1938	Michael Curtiz	(Austria-Hungary) (United States)	Four Daughters	Nominated	Born in the Austro-Hungarian Empire to a Hungarian Jewish family Became a United States citizen in 1933
1939	Frank Capra	(Kingdom of Italy) (United States)	Mr. Smith Goes to Washington	Nominated	Born in the Kingdom of Italy Became a United States citizen in 1920
1939	William Wyler	(Switzerland) (German Empire) (United States)	Wuthering Heights	Nominated	Born in the German Empire Received Swiss citizenship from his father Became a United States citizen in 1928
1940	Alfred Hitchcock	(United Kingdom) (England)	Rebecca	Nominated	
1940	William Wyler	(Switzerland) (German Empire) (United States)	The Letter	Nominated	Born in the German Empire Received Swiss citizenship from his father Became a United States citizen in 1928
1941	William Wyler	(Switzerland) (German Empire) (United States)	The Little Foxes	Nominated	Born in the German Empire Received Swiss citizenship from his father Became a United States citizen in 1928
1942	William Wyler	(Switzerland) (German Empire) (United States)	Mrs. Miniver	Won	Born in the German Empire Received Swiss citizenship from his father Became a United States citizen in 1928
1942	Michael Curtiz	(Austria-Hungary) (United States)	Yankee Doodle Dandy	Nominated	Born in the Austro-Hungarian Empire to a Hungarian Jewish family Became a United States citizen in 1933
1943	Michael Curtiz	(Austria-Hungary) (United States)	Casablanca	Won	Born in the Austro-Hungarian Empire to a Hungarian Jewish family Became a United States citizen in 1933
1943	Ernst Lubitsch	(German Empire) (United States)	Heaven Can Wait	Nominated	Born in the German Empire Became a United States citizen in 1936
1944	Alfred Hitchcock	(United Kingdom) (England)	Lifeboat	Nominated	
1944	Otto Preminger	(Austria-Hungary) (Ukraine) (United States)	Laura	Nominated	Born in modern-day Ukraine, which was then a part of the Austro-Hungarian Empire Became a United States citizen
1944	Billy Wilder	(Austria-Hungary) (Poland) (United States)	Double Indemnity	Nominated	Born in modern-day Poland, which was then a part of the Austro-Hungarian Empire, to a Polish Jewish family Became a United States citizen in 1939
1945	Billy Wilder	(Austria-Hungary) (Poland) (United States)	The Lost Weekend	Won	Born in modern-day Poland, which was then a part of the Austro-Hungarian Empire, to a Polish Jewish family Became a United States citizen in 1939
1945	Alfred Hitchcock	(United Kingdom) (England)	Spellbound	Nominated	
1945	Jean Renoir	(France)	The Southerner	Nominated	
1946	William Wyler	(Switzerland) (German Empire) (United States)	The Best Years of Our Lives	Won	Born in the German Empire Received Swiss citizenship from his father Became a United States citizen in 1928
1946	Frank Capra	(Kingdom of Italy) (United States)	It's a Wonderful Life	Nominated	Born in the Kingdom of Italy Became a United States citizen in 1920
1946	David Lean	(United Kingdom) (England)	Brief Encounter	Nominated	
1946	Robert Siodmak	(Germany)	The Killers	Nominated	
1947	Elia Kazan	(Ottoman Empire) (Greece) (United States)	Gentleman's Agreement	Won	Born in modern-day Turkey, which was then a part of the Ottoman Empire, to Cappadocian Greek family Became a United States citizen
1947	Henry Koster	(German Empire) (United States)	The Bishop's Wife	Nominated	Born in the German Empire Became a United States citizen
1947	David Lean	(United Kingdom) (England)	Great Expectations	Nominated	
1948	Anatole Litvak	(Lithuania) (Russian Empire) (Ukraine) (United States)	The Snake Pit	Nominated	Born in modern-day Ukraine, which was then part of the Russian Empire, to a Lithuanian Jewish family Became a United States citizen
1948	Jean Negulesco	(Romania) (United States)	Johnny Belinda	Nominated	Became an American citizen
1948	Laurence Olivier	(United Kingdom) (England)	Hamlet	Nominated	
1948	Fred Zinnemann	(Austria-Hungary) (Poland) (Austria) (United States)	The Search	Nominated	Born in modern-day Poland, which was then a part of the Austro-Hungarian Empire, to Austrian Jewish parents Became a United States citizen
1949	Carol Reed	(United Kingdom) (England)	The Fallen Idol	Nominated	
1949	William Wyler	(Switzerland) (German Empire) (United States)	The Heiress	Nominated	Born in the German Empire Received Swiss citizenship from his father Became a United States citizen in 1928
1950	Carol Reed	(United Kingdom) (England)	The Third Man	Nominated	
1950	Billy Wilder	(Austria-Hungary) (Poland) (United States)	Sunset Boulevard	Nominated	Born in modern-day Poland, which was then a part of the Austro-Hungarian Empire, to Polish Jewish parents Became a United States citizen in 1939
1951	Elia Kazan	(Ottoman Empire) (Greece) (United States)	A Streetcar Named Desire	Nominated	Born in modern-day Turkey, which was then a part of the Ottoman Empire, to Cappadocian Greek parents Became a United States citizen
1951	William Wyler	(Switzerland) (German Empire) (United States)	Detective Story	Nominated	Born in the German Empire Received Swiss citizenship from his father Became a United States citizen in 1928
1952	Fred Zinnemann	(Austria-Hungary) (Poland) (Austria) (United States)	High Noon	Nominated	Born in modern-day Poland, which was then a part of the Austro-Hungarian Empire, to Austrian Jewish parents Became a United States citizen
1953	Fred Zinnemann	(Austria-Hungary) (Poland) (Austria) (United States)	From Here to Eternity	Won	Born in modern-day Poland, which was then a part of the Austro-Hungarian Empire, to Austrian Jewish parents Became a United States citizen
1953	Billy Wilder	(Austria-Hungary) (Poland) (United States)	Stalag 17	Nominated	Born in modern-day Poland, which was then a part of the Austro-Hungarian Empire, to Polish Jewish parents Became a United States citizen in 1939
1953	William Wyler	(Switzerland) (German Empire) (United States)	Roman Holiday	Nominated	Born in the German Empire Received Swiss citizenship from his father Became a United States citizen in 1928
1954	Elia Kazan	(Ottoman Empire) (Greece) (United States)	On the Waterfront	Won	Born in modern-day Turkey, which was then a part of the Ottoman Empire, to Cappadocian Greek parents Became a United States citizen
1954	Alfred Hitchcock	(United Kingdom) (England)	Rear Window	Nominated	
1954	Billy Wilder	(Austria-Hungary) (Poland) (United States)	Sabrina	Nominated	Born in modern-day Poland, which was then a part of the Austro-Hungarian Empire, to Polish Jewish parents Became a United States citizen in 1939
1955	Elia Kazan	(Ottoman Empire) (Greece) (United States)	East of Eden	Nominated	Born in modern-day Turkey, which was then a part of the Ottoman Empire, to Cappadocian Greek parents Became a United States citizen
1955	David Lean	(United Kingdom) (England)	Summertime	Nominated	
1956	Michael Anderson	(United Kingdom) (England)	Around the World in 80 Days	Nominated	
1956	William Wyler	(Switzerland) (German Empire) (United States)	Friendly Persuasion	Nominated	Born in the German Empire Received Swiss citizenship from his father Became a United States citizen in 1928
1957	David Lean	(United Kingdom) (England)	The Bridge on the River Kwai	Won	
1957	Billy Wilder	(Austria-Hungary) (Poland) (United States)	Witness for the Prosecution	Nominated	Born in modern-day Poland, which was then a part of the Austro-Hungarian Empire, to Polish Jewish parents Became a United States citizen in 1939
1959	William Wyler	(Switzerland) (German Empire) (United States)	Ben-Hur	Won	Born in the German Empire Received Swiss citizenship from his father Became a United States citizen in 1928
1959	Jack Clayton	(United Kingdom) (England)	Room at the Top	Nominated	
1959	Billy Wilder	(Austria-Hungary) (Poland) (United States)	Some Like It Hot	Nominated	Born in modern-day Poland, which was then a part of the Austro-Hungarian Empire, to Polish Jewish parents Became a United States citizen in 1939
1959	Fred Zinnemann	(Austria-Hungary) (Poland) (Austria) (United States)	The Nun's Story	Nominated	Born in modern-day Poland, which was then a part of the Austro-Hungarian Empire, to Austrian Jewish parents Became a United States citizen
1960	Billy Wilder	(Austria-Hungary) (Poland) (United States)	The Apartment	Won	Born in modern-day Poland, which was then a part of the Austro-Hungarian Empire, to Polish Jewish parents Became a United States citizen in 1939
1960	Jack Cardiff	(United Kingdom) (England)	Sons and Lovers	Nominated	
1960	Alfred Hitchcock	(United Kingdom) (England) (United States)	Psycho	Nominated	Became an American citizen in 1955
1960	Fred Zinnemann	(Austria-Hungary) (Poland) (Austria) (United States)	The Sundowners	Nominated	Born in modern-day Poland, which was then a part of the Austro-Hungarian Empire, to Austrian Jewish parents Became a United States citizen
1961	Federico Fellini	(Italy)	La Dolce Vita	Nominated	
1961	J. Lee Thompson	(United Kingdom) (England)	The Guns of Navarone	Nominated	
1962	David Lean	(United Kingdom) (England)	Lawrence of Arabia	Won	
1962	Pietro Germi	(Italy)	Divorce Italian Style	Nominated	
1963	Tony Richardson	(United Kingdom) (England)	Tom Jones	Won	
1963	Federico Fellini	(Italy)	8 1/2	Nominated	
1963	Elia Kazan	(Ottoman Empire) (Greece) (United States)	America America	Nominated	Born in modern-day Turkey, which was then a part of the Ottoman Empire, to Cappadocian Greek parents Became a United States citizen
1963	Otto Preminger	(Austria-Hungary) (Ukraine) (United States)	The Cardinal	Nominated	Born in modern-day Ukraine, which was then a part of the Austro-Hungarian Empire Became a United States citizen in 1943
1964	Michael Cacoyannis	(Greece) (British Cyprus)	Zorba the Greek	Nominated	Born in British Cyprus to Greek parents
1964	Peter Glenville	(United Kingdom) (England)	Becket	Nominated	
1964	Robert Stevenson	(United Kingdom) (England) (United States)	Mary Poppins	Nominated	Became an American citizen during World War II
1965	David Lean	(United Kingdom) (England)	Doctor Zhivago	Nominated	
1965	John Schlesinger	(United Kingdom) (England)	Darling	Nominated	
1965	William Wyler	(Switzerland) (German Empire) (United States)	The Collector	Nominated	Born in the German Empire Received Swiss citizenship from his father Became a United States citizen in 1928
1966	Fred Zinnemann	(Austria-Hungary) (Poland) (Austria) (United States)	A Man for All Seasons	Won	Born in modern-day Poland, which was then a part of the Austro-Hungarian Empire, to Austrian Jewish parents Became a United States citizen
1966	Michelangelo Antonioni	(Italy)	Blowup	Nominated	
1966	Claude Lelouch	(France)	A Man and a Woman	Nominated	
1968	Carol Reed	(United Kingdom) (England)	Oliver!	Won	
1968	Anthony Harvey	(United Kingdom) (England)	The Lion in Winter	Nominated	
1968	Gillo Pontecorvo	(Italy)	The Battle of Algiers	Nominated	
1968	Franco Zeffirelli	(Italy)	Romeo and Juliet	Nominated	
1969	John Schlesinger	(United Kingdom) (England)	Midnight Cowboy	Won	
1969	Costa-Gavras	(Greece) (France)	Z	Nominated	
1970	Federico Fellini	(Italy)	Fellini Satyricon	Nominated	
1970	Ken Russell	(United Kingdom) (England)	Women in Love	Nominated	
1971	John Schlesinger	(United Kingdom) (England)	Sunday Bloody Sunday	Nominated	
1972	John Boorman	(United Kingdom) (England)	Deliverance	Nominated	
1972	Jan Troell	(Sweden)	The Emigrants	Nominated	
1973	Ingmar Bergman	(Sweden)	Cries and Whispers	Nominated	
1973	Bernardo Bertolucci	(Italy)	Last Tango in Paris	Nominated	
1974	Roman Polanski	(Poland) (France)	Chinatown	Nominated	
1974	François Truffaut	(France)	Day for Night	Nominated	
1975	Miloš Forman	(Czech Republic)	One Flew Over the Cuckoo's Nest	Won	
1975	Federico Fellini	(Italy)	Amarcord	Nominated	
1976	Ingmar Bergman	(Sweden)	Face to Face	Nominated	
1976	Lina Wertmüller	(Italy)	Seven Beauties	Nominated	
1977	Fred Zinnemann	(Austria-Hungary) (Poland) (Austria) (United States)	Julia	Nominated	Born in modern-day Poland, which was then a part of the Austro-Hungarian Empire, to Austrian Jewish parents Became a United States citizen
1978	Alan Parker	(United Kingdom) (England)	Midnight Express	Nominated	
1979	Edouard Molinaro	(France)	La Cage aux Folles	Nominated	
1979	Peter Yates	(United Kingdom) (England)	Breaking Away	Nominated	
1980	Roman Polanski	(Poland) (France)	Tess	Nominated	
1980	Martin Scorsese	(Italy) (United States)	Raging Bull	Nominated	Born in the United States Was not recognized as an Italian citizen until 2018
1981	Hugh Hudson	(United Kingdom) (England)	Chariots of Fire	Nominated	
1981	Louis Malle	(France)	Atlantic City	Nominated	
1982	Wolfgang Petersen	(Germany)	Das Boot	Nominated	
1982	Richard Attenborough	(United Kingdom) (England)	Gandhi	Won	
1983	Peter Yates	(United Kingdom) (England)	The Dresser	Nominated	
1983	Ingmar Bergman	(Sweden)	Fanny and Alexander	Nominated	
1984	Miloš Forman	(Czech Republic)	Amadeus	Won	
1984	David Lean	(United Kingdom) (England)	A Passage to India	Nominated	
1984	Roland Joffe	(United Kingdom) (France)	The Killing Fields	Nominated	
1986	Roland Joffe	(United Kingdom) (France)	The Mission	Nominated	
1987	Bernardo Bertolucci	(Italy)	The Last Emperor	Won	
1987	John Boorman	(United Kingdom) (England)	Hope and Glory	Nominated	
1987	Lasse Hallstrom	(Sweden)	My Life as a Dog	Nominated	
1987	Adrian Lyne	(United Kingdom) (England)	Fatal Attraction	Nominated	
1988	Charles Crichton	(United Kingdom) (England)	A Fish Called Wanda	Nominated	
1988	Alan Parker	(United Kingdom) (England)	Mississippi Burning	Nominated	
1988	Martin Scorsese	(Italy) (United States)	The Last Temptation of Christ	Nominated	Born in the United States Was not recognized as an Italian citizen until 2018
1989	Kenneth Branagh	(United Kingdom) (Northern Ireland) (England)	Henry V	Nominated	Born in Northern Ireland Moved in England in 1970
1989	Jim Sheridan	(Republic of Ireland)	My Left Foot	Nominated	
1990	Stephen Frears	(United Kingdom) (England)	The Grifters	Nominated	
1990	Martin Scorsese	(Italy) (United States)	Goodfellas	Nominated	Born in the United States Was not recognized as an Italian citizen until 2018
1990	Barbet Schroeder	(Switzerland) (Iran)	Reversal of Fortune	Nominated	Born in Iran to a German mother and Swiss father
1991	Ridley Scott	(United Kingdom) (England)	Thelma & Louise	Nominated	
1992	Neil Jordan	(Republic of Ireland)	The Crying Game	Nominated	
1993	Jim Sheridan	(Republic of Ireland)	In the Name of the Father	Nominated	
1994	Krzysztof Kieslowski	(Poland)	Three Colours: Red	Nominated	
1995	Mike Figgis	(United Kingdom) (England)	Leaving Las Vegas	Nominated	
1995	Michael Radford	(British Raj) (United Kingdom) (England)	Il Postino: The Postman	Nominated	Born in British India to a British father and Austria Jewish mother
1996	Anthony Minghella	(United Kingdom) (England)	The English Patient	Won	
1996	Miloš Forman	(Czech Republic)	The People vs. Larry Flynt	Nominated	
1996	Mike Leigh	(United Kingdom) (England)	Secrets & Lies	Nominated	
1997	Peter Cattaneo	(United Kingdom) (England)	The Full Monty	Nominated	
1997	Atom Egoyan	(United Arab Republic) (Armenia) (Canada)	The Sweet Hereafter	Nominated	Born in modern-day Egypt, which was then a part of the United Arab Republic, to Armenian-Egyptian parents Became a Canadian citizen Became an Armenian citizen in 2018
1998	Roberto Benigni	(Italy)	Life is Beautiful	Nominated	
1998	John Madden	(United Kingdom) (England)	Shakespeare in Love	Nominated	
1999	Sam Mendes	(United Kingdom) (England)	American Beauty	Won	
1999	Lasse Hallstrom	(Sweden)	The Cider House Rules	Nominated	
2000	Stephen Daldry	(United Kingdom) (England)	Billy Elliot	Nominated	
2000	Ridley Scott	(United Kingdom) (England)	Gladiator	Nominated	
2001	Ridley Scott	(United Kingdom) (England)	Black Hawk Down	Nominated	
2002	Roman Polanski	(Poland) (France)	The Pianist	Won	
2002	Pedro Almodóvar	(Spain)	Talk to Her	Nominated	
2002	Martin Scorsese	(Italy) (United States)	Gangs of New York	Nominated	Born in the United States. Was not recognized as an Italian citizen until 2018
2002	Stephen Daldry	(United Kingdom) (England)	The Hours	Nominated	
2004	Mike Leigh	(United Kingdom) (England)	Vera Drake	Nominated	
2004	Martin Scorsese	(Italy) (United States)	Aviator	Nominated	
2005	George Clooney	(France) (United States)	Good Night, and Good Luck	Nominated	Born in the United States. He acquired the French citizenship in 2025.
2006	Stephen Frears	(United Kingdom) (England)	The Queen	Nominated	
2006	Paul Greengrass	(United Kingdom) (England)	United 93	Nominated	
2006	Martin Scorsese	(Italy) (United States)	The Departed	Won	Born in the United States Was not recognized as an Italian citizen until 2018
2008	Danny Boyle	(United Kingdom) (England)	Slumdog Millionaire	Won	
2008	Stephen Daldry	(United Kingdom) (England)	The Reader	Nominated	
2010	Darren Aronofsky	(Poland) (United States)	Black Swan	Nominated	Holds dual Polish/American citizenship
2010	Tom Hooper	(Australia) (United Kingdom) (England)	The King's Speech	Won	Holds dual British/Australian citizenship
2011	Michel Hazanavicius	(France)	The Artist	Won	
2011	Martin Scorsese	(Italy) (United States)	Hugo	Nominated	Born in the United States Was not recognized as an Italian citizen until 2018
2012	Michael Haneke	(Germany) (Austria)	Amour	Nominated	Born in Germany
2013	Steve McQueen	(United Kingdom) (England)	12 Years a Slave	Nominated	
2013	Martin Scorsese	(Italy) (United States)	The Wolf of Wall Street	Nominated	Born in the United States Was not recognized as an Italian citizen until 2018
2014	Morten Tyldum	(Norway)	The Imitation Game	Nominated	
2015	Lenny Abrahamson	(Republic of Ireland)	Room	Nominated	
2016	Damien Chazelle	(France) (United States)	La La Land	Won	Holds dual American/French citizenship
2017	Christopher Nolan	(United States) (United Kingdom) (England)	Dunkirk	Nominated	Holds dual British/American citizenship
2018	Yorgos Lanthimos	(Greece)	The Favourite	Nominated	
2018	Pawel Pawlikowski	(Poland)	Cold War	Nominated	
2019	Sam Mendes	(United Kingdom) (England)	1917	Nominated	
2019	Martin Scorsese	(Italy) (United States)	The Irishman	Nominated	Holds dual American/Italian citizenship
2020/2021	Thomas Vinterberg	(Denmark)	Another Round	Nominated	
2020/2021	Emerald Fennell	(United Kingdom) (England)	Promising Young Woman	Nominated	
2021	Kenneth Branagh	(United Kingdom) (Northern Ireland) (England)	Belfast	Nominated	Born in Northern Ireland Moved in England in 1970
2022	Martin McDonagh	(United Kingdom) (Republic of Ireland)	The Banshees of Inisherin	Nominated	Holds dual British/Irish citizenship
2022	Ruben Östlund	(Sweden)	Triangle of Sadness	Nominated	
2023	Justine Triet	(France)	Anatomy of a Fall	Nominated	
2023	Yorgos Lanthimos	(Greece)	Poor Things	Nominated	
2023	Christopher Nolan	(United States) (United Kingdom) (England)	Oppenheimer	Won	Holds dual British/American citizenship
2023	Jonathan Glazer	(United Kingdom) (England)	The Zone of Interest	Nominated	
2023	Martin Scorsese	(Italy) (United States)	Killers of the Flower Moon	Nominated	Holds dual American/Italian citizenship
2024	Jacques Audiard	(France)	Emilia Pérez	Nominated	
2024	Coralie Fargeat	(France)	The Substance	Nominated	
2025	Joachim Trier	(Denmark) (Norway)	Sentimental Value	Nominated	Born in Denmark; Raised in Norway

== Best Actor in a Leading Role ==
Best Actor in a Leading Role
Year	Name	Country	Role	Film	Status	Milestone / Notes
1927/ 1928	Charlie Chaplin	(United Kingdom) (England)	The Tramp	The Circus	Received	Initially one of the nominees, the academy rescinded all three of his nominations (also for directing and writing) and instead issued him a special award for his multitasking achievements.
1927/ 1928	Emil Jannings	(Switzerland) (Germany)	Grand Duke; Sergius Alexander	The Last Command	Won	Born in Switzerland. First German actor to be nominated for and win an Oscar (for both films).
1927/ 1928	Emil Jannings	(Switzerland) (Germany)	August Schilling	The Way of All Flesh	Won	The only Oscar-winning performance that is a lost film; currently, only two fragments are known to exist.
1928/ 1929	Paul Muni	(Austria-Hungary) (Ukraine) (United States)	"James Dyke"	The Valiant	Nominated	First actor of Austro-Hungarian (later defined as Ukrainian) background to earn an Oscar nomination. Became a United States citizen.
1929/ 1930	George Arliss	(United Kingdom) (England)	Prime Minister; Benjamin Disraeli	Disraeli	Won	First British/English actor to win an Oscar. (No explanation was given as to why neither Arliss, nor Best Actress winner Norma Shearer, only won for just one of their two nominated films.)
1929/ 1930	George Arliss	(United Kingdom) (England)	The Raja	The Green Goddess	Nominated	
1929/ 1930	Maurice Chevalier	(France)	Pierre Mirande	The Big Pond	Nominated	First French actor to be nominated for an Oscar (for both films).
1929/ 1930	Maurice Chevalier	(France)	Count Alfred Renard	The Love Parade	Nominated	First French actor to be nominated for an Oscar (for both films).
1929/ 1930	Ronald Colman	(United Kingdom) (England)	Capt. Hugh "Bulldog" Drummond	Bulldog Drummond	Nominated	
1929/ 1930	Ronald Colman	(United Kingdom) (England)	Michel	Condemned	Nominated	
1932/ 1933	Charles Laughton	(United Kingdom) (England)	King Henry VIII of England	The Private Life of Henry VIII	Won	First LGBTQ+ winner in this category, albeit unknown until after his death.
1932/ 1933	Leslie Howard	(United Kingdom) (England)	Peter Standish	Berkeley Square	Nominated	
1932/ 1933	Paul Muni	(Austria-Hungary) (Ukraine) (United States)	James Allen	I Am a Fugitive from a Chain Gang	Nominated	
1935	Victor McLaglen	(United Kingdom) (England)	Gypo Nolan	The Informer	Won	
1935	Charles Laughton	(United Kingdom) (England)	Vice-Admiral; William Bligh	Mutiny on the Bounty	Nominated	
1935	Paul Muni	(Austria-Hungary) (Ukraine) (United States)	Joe Radek	Black Fury	Write-In	Originally not a nominee, Muni was nominated by a write-in campaign. For 1934–1935, the AMPAS permitted this, following the controversy over Bette Davis's omission for Of Human Bondage (for which she too received a write-in nomination). The academy discontinued this process as of 1936.
1936	Paul Muni	(Austria-Hungary) (Ukraine) (United States)	Louis Pasteur	The Story of Louis Pasteur	Won	First Jewish actor to win an Oscar. First actor of Ukrainian descent (and Austrian heritage) to win Best Actor.
1937	Paul Muni	(Austria-Hungary) (Ukraine) (United States)	Émile Zola	The Life of Émile Zola	Nominated	
1937	Charles Boyer	(France)	Emperor; Napoléon Bonaparte	Conquest	Nominated	
1938	Charles Boyer	(France)	Pepé le Moko	Algiers	Nominated	
1938	Leslie Howard	(United Kingdom) (England)	Professor; Henry Higgins	Pygmalion	Nominated	
1938	Robert Donat	(United Kingdom) (England)	Dr. Andrew Manson	The Citadel	Nominated	
1939	Robert Donat	(United Kingdom) (England)	Mr. Charles; Edward Chipping	Goodbye, Mr. Chips	Won	
1939	Laurence Olivier	(United Kingdom) (England)	Heathcliff	Wuthering Heights	Nominated	
1940	Laurence Olivier	(United Kingdom) (England)	George Fortescue; Maximilian "Maxim" de Winter	Rebecca	Nominated	
1940	Charlie Chaplin	(United Kingdom) (England)	Adenoid Hynkel / The Barber	The Great Dictator	Nominated	
1941	Cary Grant	(United Kingdom) (England)	Roger Adams	Penny Serenade	Nominated	
1942	Ronald Colman	(United Kingdom) (England)	Charles Rainier	Random Harvest	Nominated	
1943	Paul Lukas	(Austria-Hungary) (Hungary) (United States)	Kurt Müller	Watch on the Rhine	Won	First Hungarian actor to win an Oscar. Became a United States citizen in 1937.
1944	Charles Boyer	(France) (United States)	Gregory Anton	Gaslight	Nominated	Although Boyer never won a competitive Academy Award, he did receive a Certificate of Merit for establishing the French Research Foundation in Los Angeles to benefit the cinematic industry. Became a United States citizen in 1942
1944	Barry Fitzgerald	(Republic of Ireland)	Father Fitzgibbon	Going My Way	Nominated	First Irish nominee in this category. Due to an anomaly in the voting process, Fitzgerald received nominations in both lead and supporting actor for the same performance/film. As a result, AMPAS amended its rules to prevent any such recurrence.
1944	Cary Grant	(United Kingdom) (England) (United States)	Ernie Mott	None but the Lonely Heart	Nominated	Grant lost both nominations, but won an Honorary Oscar 25 years later. Became a United States citizen in 1942.
1945	Ray Milland	(United Kingdom) (Wales)	Don Birnam	The Lost Weekend	Won	First Welsh actor to win an Oscar.
1945	Cornel Wilde	(Austria-Hungary) (Hungary) (United States)	Frédéric Chopin	A Song to Remember	Nominated	Became a United States citizen.
1946	Laurence Olivier	(United Kingdom) (England)	King Henry V of England	Henry V	Nominated	
1947	Ronald Colman	(United Kingdom) (England)	Anthony John	A Double Life	Won	
1947	Michael Redgrave	(United Kingdom) (England)	Orin Mannon	Mourning Becomes Electra	Nominated	
1948	Laurence Olivier	(United Kingdom) (England)	Prince Hamlet of Denmark	Hamlet	Won	First Best Actor winner to also be nominated for Best Director (having directed themself to a win); and simultaneously directed the Best Picture winner.
1949	Richard Todd	(Republic of Ireland) (England)	Cpl. Lachlan "Lachie" MacLachlan	The Hasty Heart	Nominated	
1952	Alec Guinness	(United Kingdom) (England)	Henry "Dutch" Holland	The Lavender Hill Mob	Nominated	
1953	Richard Burton	(United Kingdom) (Wales)	Marcellus Gallio	The Robe	Nominated	
1954	James Mason	(United Kingdom) (England)	Norman Maine (né Ernest Sidney Gubbins)	A Star Is Born	Nominated	
1954	Dan O'Herlihy	(Republic of Ireland)	Robinson Crusoe	Robinson Crusoe	Nominated	
1956	Yul Brynner	(Far Eastern Republic) (Soviet Union) (United States)	King Mongkut of Siam	The King and I	Won	First Asian actor (and specifically Russian) to win an Oscar. Won a 1952 Tony Award for Best Featured Actor – Musical for the same role. Became a United States citizen in 1943.
1956	Laurence Olivier	(United Kingdom) (England)	King Richard III of England	Richard III	Nominated	
1957	Alec Guinness	(United Kingdom) (England)	Lt. Col. Nicholson	The Bridge on the River Kwai	Won	
1957	Charles Laughton	(United Kingdom) (England)	Sir Wilfrid Robarts, Q.C.	Witness for the Prosecution	Nominated	
1958	David Niven	(United Kingdom) (England)	Maj. Angus Pollock	Separate Tables	Won	Shortest Lead Actor performance to win an Oscar, clocking in at 23m39s.
1959	Laurence Harvey	(Lithuania) (South Africa)	Joe Lampton	Room at the Top	Nominated	First Lithuanian actor to be nominated for an Oscar.
1959	Paul Muni	(Austria-Hungary) (Ukraine) (United States)	Dr. Sam Abelman	The Last Angry Man	Nominated	
1960	Trevor Howard	(United Kingdom) (England)	Walter Morel	Sons and Lovers	Nominated	
1960	Laurence Olivier	(United Kingdom) (England)	Archie Rice	The Entertainer	Nominated	
1961	Maximilian Schell	(Switzerland) (Austria)	Hans Rolfe	Judgment at Nuremberg	Won	First Swiss actor to win an Oscar.
1961	Charles Boyer	(France) (United States)	César	Fanny	Nominated	Most nominations for a French actor, with four.
1962	Marcello Mastroianni	(Italy)	Ferdinando Cefalù	Divorce Italian Style	Nominated	First Italian nominated for Best Actor. First foreign-language performance (fully in Italian dialogue) nominated for an Oscar.
1962	Peter O'Toole	(United Kingdom) (England)	Col. T. E. Lawrence	Lawrence of Arabia	Nominated	
1963	Albert Finney	(United Kingdom) (England)	Tom Jones	Tom Jones	Nominated	Achieved the "British Triple Crown of Acting" (via the BAFTA TV Awards) in 2003.
1963	Richard Harris	(Republic of Ireland)	Frank Machin	This Sporting Life	Nominated	
1963	Rex Harrison	(United Kingdom) (England)	Julius Caesar	Cleopatra	Nominated	
1964	Rex Harrison	(United Kingdom) (England)	Prof. Henry Higgins	My Fair Lady	Won	Won a 1957 Tony Award for Best Leading Actor – Musical for the same role, prior to the Oscar.
1964	Peter Sellers	(United Kingdom) (England)	Dr. Strangelove / G/C Lionel Mandrake / Pres. Merkin Muffley	Dr. Strangelove, or: How I Learned to Stop Worrying and Love the Bomb	Nominated	
1964	Peter O'Toole	(United Kingdom) (England)	King Henry II of England	Becket	Nominated	
1964	Richard Burton	(United Kingdom) (Wales)	Archbishop Thomas Becket of Canterbury	Becket	Nominated	
1965	Richard Burton	(United Kingdom) (Wales)	Alec Leamas	The Spy Who Came In from the Cold	Nominated	
1965	Laurence Olivier	(United Kingdom) (England)	Othello	Othello	Nominated	
1965	Oskar Werner	(Austria)	Dr. Willie Schümann	Ship of Fools	Nominated	
1966	Richard Burton	(United Kingdom) (Wales)	George	Who's Afraid of Virginia Woolf?	Nominated	
1966	Paul Scofield	(United Kingdom) (England)	Sir Thomas More	A Man for All Seasons	Won	Won a 1962 Tony Award for Best Leading Actor – Play for the same role, prior to the Oscar. Achieved the "American Triple Crown of Acting" (via the Primetime Emmy) in 1969.
1966	Michael Caine	(United Kingdom) (England)	Alfie Elkins	Alfie	Nominated	
1968	Alan Bates	(United Kingdom) (England)	Yakov Bok	The Fixer	Nominated	
1968	Ron Moody	(United Kingdom) (England)	Fagin	Oliver!	Nominated	
1968	Peter O'Toole	(United Kingdom) (England)	King Henry II of England	The Lion in Winter	Nominated	
1969	Peter O'Toole	(United Kingdom) (England)	Mr. Arthur Chipping	Goodbye, Mr. Chips	Nominated	
1969	Richard Burton	(United Kingdom) (Wales)	King Henry VIII of England	Anne of the Thousand Days	Nominated	
1971	Peter Finch	(Australia) (United Kingdom)	Dr. Daniel Hirsh	Sunday Bloody Sunday	Nominated	First Australian to be nominated for Best Actor. (Held dual British-Australian citizenship.)
1972	Michael Caine	(United Kingdom) (England)	Milo Tindle	Sleuth	Nominated	
1972	Laurence Olivier	(United Kingdom) (England)	Andrew Wyke	Sleuth	Nominated	
1972	Peter O'Toole	(United Kingdom) (England)	Jack Gurney, 14th Earl of Gurney	The Ruling Class	Nominated	
1974	Albert Finney	(United Kingdom) (England)	Hercule Poirot, P.I.	Murder on the Orient Express	Nominated	
1975	Maximilian Schell	(Switzerland) (Austria)	Arthur Goldman	The Man in the Glass Booth	Nominated	
1976	Peter Finch ^{†}	(Australia) (United Kingdom)	Howard Beale	Network	Won	First Australian actor to win Best Actor. First actor to win an Oscar posthumously.
1976	Robert De Niro	(Italy) (United States)	Travis Bickle	Taxi Driver	Nominated	Born in the United States but became Italian citizen in 2006.
1976	Giancarlo Giannini	(Italy)	Pasqualino Frafuso	Seven Beauties	Nominated	
1977	Marcello Mastroianni	(Italy)	Gabriele	A Special Day	Nominated	
1977	Richard Burton	(United Kingdom) (Wales)	Dr. Martin Dysart	Equus	Nominated	To date, Burton holds the record for most nominations (seven) without a win OR an Honorary Award before their death. (One less than O'Toole, who received an Honorary before his eighth nomination and subsequent death; and Glenn Close, who is still alive and working as of 2023.)
1978	Robert De Niro	(Italy) (United States)	Staff Sergeant Mikhail "Mike" Vronsky	The Deer Hunter	Nominated	
1978	Laurence Olivier	(United Kingdom) (England)	Ezra Lieberman	The Boys from Brazil	Nominated	Tied with Spencer Tracy for most nominations in this category, with nine each. (Olivier has additional nominations in Supporting Actor and Director, as well as two Honorary Oscars.)
1979	Peter Sellers	(United Kingdom) (England)	Chance the Gardener, aka Chauncey Gardiner	Being There	Nominated	
1980	Robert De Niro	(Italy) (United States)	Jake LaMotta	Raging Bull	Won	
1980	John Hurt	(United Kingdom) (England)	John Merrick	The Elephant Man	Nominated	
1980	Peter O'Toole	(United Kingdom) (England)	Eli Cross	The Stunt Man	Nominated	
1981	Dudley Moore	(United Kingdom) (England)	Arthur Bach	Arthur	Nominated	
1982	Ben Kingsley	(United Kingdom) (England)	Mahātmā Gandhi	Gandhi	Won	First actor of Indian ancestry to win an Oscar. (Kingsley was born and raised in the UK.); First Oscar-winning performance partially spoken in Hindi.
1982	Peter O'Toole	(United Kingdom) (England)	Alan Swann	My Favorite Year	Nominated	
1983	Michael Caine	(United Kingdom) (England)	Dr. Frank Bryant	Educating Rita	Nominated	
1983	Tom Conti	(United Kingdom) (Scotland)	Gowan McGland	Reuben, Reuben	Nominated	First Scottish actor nominated in this category.
1983	Tom Courtenay	(United Kingdom) (England)	Norman	The Dresser	Nominated	
1983	Albert Finney	(United Kingdom) (England)	Sir	The Dresser	Nominated	
1984	Albert Finney	(United Kingdom) (England)	Geoffrey Firmin	Under the Volcano	Nominated	
1986	Bob Hoskins	(United Kingdom) (England)	George	Mona Lisa	Nominated	
1987	Marcello Mastroianni	(Italy)	Romano Patroni	Dark Eyes	Nominated	Most nominations for an Italian-based actor, with three.
1988	Max von Sydow	(Sweden) (France)	Lassefar "Lasse" Karlsson	Pelle the Conqueror	Nominated	First Swedish actor, and Swedish-language performance, to be nominated for an Oscar. Later he held dual Swedish/French citizneship.
1989	Daniel Day-Lewis	(United Kingdom) (England) (Republic of Ireland)	Christy Brown	My Left Foot	Won	Later in life, in addition to the UK, obtained dual citizenship from Ireland)
1989	Kenneth Branagh	(United Kingdom) (Northern Ireland) (England)	King Henry V of England	Henry V	Nominated	First Northern Irish actor nominated for an Oscar. Achieved the "British Triple Crown" (via the BAFTA TV Awards) in 2009.
1990	Jeremy Irons	(United Kingdom) (England)	Claus von Bülow	Reversal of Fortune	Won	Achieved the "American Triple Crown of Acting" (via the Primetime Emmy) in 1997.
1990	Gérard Depardieu	(France)	Cyrano de Bergerac	Cyrano de Bergerac	Nominated	First French-language performance in this category nominated for an Oscar.
1990	Richard Harris	(Republic of Ireland)	"Bull" McCabe	The Field	Nominated	
1990	Robert De Niro	(Italy) (United States)	Leonard Lowe	Awakenings	Nominated	
1991	Robert De Niro	(Italy) (United States)	Max Cady	Cape Fear	Nominated	
1991	Anthony Hopkins	(United Kingdom) (Wales)	Dr. Hannibal Lecter	The Silence of the Lambs	Won	First actor to achieve the "British Triple Crown of Acting" w/ a BAFTA Film win in 1992, albeit by way of a non-competitive '85 Honorary Olivier Award.
1992	Stephen Rea	(United Kingdom) (Northern Ireland) (Republic of Ireland)	Fergus	The Crying Game	Nominated	
1993	Liam Neeson	(United Kingdom) (Northern Ireland)	Oskar Schindler	Schindler's List	Nominated	
1993	Daniel Day-Lewis	(United Kingdom) (England) (Republic of Ireland)	Gerry Conlon	In the Name of the Father	Nominated	
1993	Anthony Hopkins	(United Kingdom) (Wales)	Mr. James Stevens	The Remains of the Day	Nominated	
1994	Nigel Hawthorne	(United Kingdom) (England)	King George III	The Madness of King George	Nominated	Hawthorne was outed as LGBTQ+ by the press, but nevertheless attended the ceremony with his partner, Trevor Bentham. First actor to achieve the "British Triple Crown of Acting" competitively, in 1996, via the BAFTA Film Awards.
1995	Anthony Hopkins	(United Kingdom) (Wales)	Pres. Richard Nixon	Nixon	Nominated	
1995	Massimo Troisi ^{†}	(Italy)	Mario Ruoppolo	Il Postino: The Postman	Nominated	Troisi suffered a fatal heart attack just 12 hours after main filming was complete. All subsequent accolades were posthumous.
1996	Ralph Fiennes	(United Kingdom) (England)	Count László de Almásy	The English Patient	Nominated	
1998	Ian McKellen	(United Kingdom) (England)	James Whale	Gods and Monsters	Nominated	First openly LGBTQ+ British actor to be nominated for an Oscar in this category.
1998	Roberto Benigni	(Italy)	Guido Orefice	Life is Beautiful	Won	First Italian-(or any)-language performance to win an Oscar for Best Actor.
2000	Javier Bardem	(Spain)	Reinaldo Arenas	Before Night Falls	Nominated	First Spanish actor nominated for an Oscar. First Spanish-language performance nominated in this category.
2001	Tom Wilkinson	(United Kingdom) (England)	Dr. Matt Fowler	In the Bedroom	Nominated	
2002	Michael Caine	(United Kingdom) (England)	Thomas Fowler	The Quiet American	Nominated	
2002	Daniel Day-Lewis	(United Kingdom) (England) (Republic of Ireland)	William "Bill the Butcher" Cutting	Gangs of New York	Nominated	
2003	Ben Kingsley	(United Kingdom) (England)	Col. Massoud; Amir Behrani	House of Sand and Fog	Nominated	
2003	Jude Law	(United Kingdom) (England)	William "W. P." Inman	Cold Mountain	Nominated	
2006	Peter O'Toole	(United Kingdom) (England)	Maurice Russell	Venus	Nominated	Tied with actress Glenn Close for the most Oscar nominations without a win. However, he did receive the Honorary Academy Award at the 75th Academy Awards.
2007	Daniel Day-Lewis	(United Kingdom) (England) (Republic of Ireland)	Daniel Plainview	There Will Be Blood	Won	
2007	Viggo Mortensen	(Denmark) (United States)	Nikolai Luzhin	Eastern Promises	Nominated	First Danish actor nominated for an Oscar. Holds dual Danish/American citizneship.
2007	George Clooney	(France) (United States)	Michael Clayton	Michael Clayton	Nominated	Born in the United States but became French citizen in 2025.
2009	George Clooney	(France) (United States)	Ryan Bingham	Up in the Air	Nominated	Born in the United States but became French citizen in 2025.
2009	Colin Firth	(United Kingdom) (England) (Italy)	George Falconer	A Single Man	Nominated	Holds dual Italian/British citizneship.
2010	Colin Firth	(United Kingdom) (England) (Italy)	King George VI	The King's Speech	Won	Holds dual Italian/British citizneship.
2010	Javier Bardem	(Spain)	Uxbal	Biutiful	Nominated	
2010	Jesse Eisenberg	(Poland) / (United States)	Mark Zuckerberg	The Social Network	Nominated	Eisenberg was born in the United States but became Polish citizen in 2025
2011	George Clooney	(France) (United States)	Matthew "Matt" King	The Descendants	Nominated	
2011	Jean Dujardin	(France)	George Valentin	The Artist	Won	First French actor to win an Oscar, and first silent film performance to win since Jannings at the 1st Academy Awards.
2011	Gary Oldman	(United Kingdom) (England)	George Smiley	Tinker, Tailor, Soldier, Spy	Nominated	
2012	Daniel Day-Lewis	(United Kingdom) (England) (Republic of Ireland)	Pres. Abraham Lincoln	Lincoln	Won	With this third win, he holds the record for most wins in this category. He's tied for second-most overall behind Katharine Hepburn, who still ranks first with four for Best Actress.
2012	Hugh Jackman	(United Kingdom) (Australia)	Jean Valjean	Les Misérables	Nominated	Holds dual Australian/British citizenship.
2013	Christian Bale	(United Kingdom) (England) (United States)	Irving Rosenfeld	American Hustle	Nominated	Holds dual American/British citizenship.
2013	Chiwetel Ejiofor	(United Kingdom) (England)	Solomon Northup	12 Years a Slave	Nominated	
2014	Benedict Cumberbatch	(United Kingdom) (England)	Alan Turing	The Imitation Game	Nominated	
2014	Eddie Redmayne	(United Kingdom) (England)	Prof. Stephen Hawking	The Theory of Everything	Won	
2015	Eddie Redmayne	(United Kingdom) (England)	Lili Elbe	The Danish Girl	Nominated	
2015	Michael Fassbender	(Republic of Ireland) (Germany)	Steve Jobs	Steve Jobs	Nominated	Born in West Germany but raised in Ireland (does not hold Irish citizenship).
2016	Andrew Garfield	(United States) (United Kingdom) (England)	Cpl. Desmond Doss	Hacksaw Ridge	Nominated	Holds dual British/American citizneship.
2016	Viggo Mortensen	(Denmark) (United States)	Ben Cash	Captain Fantastic	Nominated	
2017	Timothée Chalamet	(United States) (France)	Elio Perlman	Call Me by Your Name	Nominated	Holds dual French/American citizneship.
2017	Daniel Day-Lewis	(United Kingdom) (England) (Republic of Ireland)	Reynolds Woodcock	Phantom Thread	Nominated	
2017	Gary Oldman	(United Kingdom) (England)	The Rt. Hon. Sir Winston Churchill	Darkest Hour	Won	
2017	Daniel Kaluuya	(United Kingdom) (England)	Chris Washington	Get Out	Nominated	
2018	Christian Bale	(United Kingdom) (England) (United States)	V.P. Dick Cheney	Vice	Nominated	Holds dual American/British citizenship.
2018	Viggo Mortensen	(Denmark) (United States)	"Tony Lip" Vallelonga	Green Book	Nominated	
2019	Antonio Banderas	(Spain)	Salvador Mallo	Pain and Glory	Nominated	
2019	Jonathan Pryce	(United Kingdom) (Wales)	Cardinal Jorge; Mario Bergoglio	The Two Popes	Nominated	
2020/ 2021	Anthony Hopkins	(United Kingdom) (Wales) (United States)	Anthony	The Father	Won	First Welsh actor to win twice. Most nominations for a Welsh actor, with six (including two in supporting). Became a United States citizen in 2000.
2020/ 2021	Riz Ahmed	(Pakistan) (United Kingdom) (England)	Ruben Stone	Sound of Metal	Nominated	First Pakistani actor nominated for an Oscar. First Muslim nominated in this category. Second Best Actor nominee to utilize ASL after Alan Arkin, The Heart Is a Lonely Hunter (1968).
2020/ 2021	Gary Oldman	(United Kingdom) (England)	Herman J. Mankiewicz	Mank	Nominated	
2021	Benedict Cumberbatch	(United Kingdom) (England)	Phil Burbank	The Power of the Dog	Nominated	
2021	Andrew Garfield	(United States) (United Kingdom) (England)	Jonathan Larson	Tick, Tick... Boom!	Nominated	
2021	Javier Bardem	(Spain)	Desi Arnaz	Being the Ricardos	Nominated	Most nominations for a Spanish actor, with four (including one win in supporting).
2022	Bill Nighy	(United Kingdom) (England)	Mr. Rodney Williams	Living	Nominated	
2022	Colin Farrell	(Republic of Ireland)	Pádraic Súilleabháin	The Banshees of Inisherin	Nominated	
2022	Paul Mescal	(Republic of Ireland)	Calum Paterson	Aftersun	Nominated	
2023	Cillian Murphy	(Republic of Ireland)	J. Robert Oppenheimer	Oppenheimer	Won	First Irish actor to win in this category.
2024	Ralph Fiennes	(United Kingdom) (England)	Cardinal Thomas Lawrence	Conclave	Nominated	
2024	Sebastian Stan	(Romania)	Donald J. Trump	The Apprentice	Nominated	Born in Romania and moved to the United States as a child.
2024	Timothée Chalamet	(United States) (France)	Bob Dylan	A Complete Unknown	Nominated	
2025	Timothée Chalamet	(United States) (France)	Marty Mauser	Marty Supreme	Nominated	

== Best Actress in a Leading Role ==
Best Actress in a Leading Role
Year	Name	Country	Role	Film	Status	Milestone / Notes
1929/ 1930	Greta Garbo	(Sweden)	Anna "Christie" Christofferson	Anna Christie	Nominated	First Swedish actress to be nominated for an Oscar (for both films listed).
1929/ 1930	Greta Garbo	(Sweden)	Mme. Rita Cavallini	Romance	Nominated	First Swedish actress to be nominated for an Oscar (for both films listed).
1930/ 1931	Marlene Dietrich	(Germany)	Mlle. Amy Jolly	Morocco	Nominated	First German actress to be nominated for an Oscar.
1931/ 1932	Lynn Fontanne	(United Kingdom) (England)	The Actress	The Guardsman	Nominated	First British (specifically English) actress nominated for an Oscar. Later moved to America with her husband, actor Alfred Lunt (also co-star, with whom she was nominated alongside). The two Broadway theatre legends later retired to their estate, Ten Chimneys, in Genesee Depot, Wisconsin—now a National Historic Landmark.
1932/ 1933	Diana Wynyard	(United Kingdom) (England)	Jane Marryot	Cavalcade	Nominated	
1934	Claudette Colbert	(France) (United States)	Ellen "Ellie" Andrews	It Happened One Night	Won	French-born American-citizen. Nonetheless, the first French actress to be nominated for, and subsequently win, an Oscar.
1935	Claudette Colbert	(France) (United States)	Dr. Jane Everest	Private Worlds	Nominated	
1935	Elisabeth Bergner	(Austria-Hungary) (United Kingdom)	Gemma Jones	Escape Me Never	Nominated	
1935	Merle Oberon	(Dominion of Ceylon) (Māori people)	Kitty Vane	The Dark Angel	Nominated	First person of Indigenous descent and of Asian descent nominated for an Academy Award in any category. She is of partial Sri Lankan (Ceylon/Burgher) and Māori (Polynesian) descent.
1936	Luise Rainer	(Germany) (Austria)	Anna Held	The Great Ziegfeld	Won	First German & first Austrian (by homeland) to win an Academy Award.
1937	Luise Rainer	(Germany) (Austria)	O-Lan	The Good Earth	Won	First person to ever win two Oscars consecutively. (Spencer Tracy would achieve the same feat just one year later.); First German/Austrian to win two Oscars.
1937	Greta Garbo	(Sweden)	Marguerite Gautier	Camille	Nominated	
1938	Wendy Hiller	(United Kingdom) (England)	Eliza Doolittle	Pygmalion	Nominated	
1939	Greer Garson	(United Kingdom) (England)	Katherine Ellis	Goodbye, Mr. Chips	Nominated	
1939	Vivien Leigh	(British Raj) (Bengal Presidency)	Scarlett O'Hara	Gone with the Wind	Won	Longest performance to win an Oscar: 2h23m32s.
1939	Greta Garbo	(Sweden)	Nina Ivanovna "Ninotchka" Yakushova	Ninotchka	Nominated	Garbo never won competitively, but did receive an Honorary Oscar in 1955.
1940	Joan Fontaine	(United Kingdom) (United States)	The Second Mrs. de Winter	Rebecca	Nominated	
1941	Joan Fontaine	(United Kingdom) (United States)	Lina McLaidlaw-Aysgarth	Suspicion	Won	Fontaine was the only person to ever win an Oscar from acting in an Alfred Hitchcock-directed film.
1941	Olivia de Havilland	(United Kingdom) (United States)	Miss Emmy Brown	Hold Back the Dawn	Nominated	
1941	Greer Garson	(United Kingdom) (England)	Edna Gladney	Blossoms in the Dust	Nominated	
1942	Greer Garson	(United Kingdom) (England)	Mrs. Kay Miniver	Mrs. Miniver	Won	First English-born actress to win an Oscar. Garson gave the longest Oscar speech on record—at nearly six minutes in length, which prompted the notorious orchestral cue-offs.
1943	Greer Garson	(United Kingdom) (England)	Marie Curie	Madame Curie	Nominated	
1943	Joan Fontaine	(United Kingdom) (United States)	Tessa Sanger	The Constant Nymph	Nominated	
1943	Ingrid Bergman	(Sweden)	María	For Whom the Bell Tolls	Nominated	
1944	Ingrid Bergman	(Sweden)	Paula Alquist-Anton	Gaslight	Won	First Swedish actress, let alone nordbø, to win an Academy Award in any acting category.
1944	Claudette Colbert	(France) (United States)	Mrs. Anne Hilton	Since You Went Away	Nominated	
1944	Greer Garson	(United Kingdom) (England)	Susie "Sparrow" Parkington	Mrs. Parkington	Nominated	
1945	Greer Garson	(United Kingdom) (England)	Mary Rafferty	The Valley of Decision	Nominated	With this nomination, Garson tied Bette Davis for the most consecutive acting nominations—five each. (Davis received hers from 1938 to 1942; both in the Best Actress category.) Their shared record still stands today.
1945	Ingrid Bergman	(Sweden)	Sister Superior; Mary Benedict	The Bells of St. Mary's	Nominated	
1946	Olivia de Havilland	(United Kingdom) (United States)	Josephine "Jody" Norris	To Each His Own	Won	
1946	Celia Johnson	(United Kingdom) (England)	Laura Jesson	Brief Encounter	Nominated	
1948	Ingrid Bergman	(Sweden)	Joan of Arc	Joan of Arc	Nominated	
1948	Olivia de Havilland	(United Kingdom) (United States)	Virginia Stuart Cunningham	The Snake Pit	Nominated	
1949	Olivia de Havilland	(United Kingdom) (United States)	Catherine Sloper	The Heiress	Won	De Havilland and Fontaine became the first (and to-date, only) pair of sisters to each win Academy Awards.
1949	Deborah Kerr	(Scotland) (England)	Evelyn Boult	Edward, My Son	Nominated	First Scottish actress to be nominated for an Academy Award.
1951	Vivien Leigh	(British Raj) (Bengal Presidency)	Blanche DuBois	A Streetcar; Named Desire	Won	
1953	Leslie Caron	(France)	Lili Daurier	Lili	Nominated	
1953	Deborah Kerr	(Scotland) (England)	Karen Holmes	From Here to Eternity	Nominated	
1953	Audrey Hepburn	(Belgium) (United Kingdom)	Crown Princess Ann	Roman Holiday	Won	First Belgian actress to be nominated for an Academy Award.
1954	Audrey Hepburn	(Belgium) (United Kingdom)	Sabrina Fairchild	Sabrina	Nominated	
1955	Anna Magnani	(Italy)	Serafina Delle Rose	The Rose Tattoo	Won	First Italian actress to win an Academy Award (mostly in English, with occasional Italian dialogue).
1956	Ingrid Bergman	(Sweden)	Anna Koreff	Anastasia	Won	First Swedish actress to win two Oscars.
1956	Deborah Kerr	(Scotland) (England)	Anna Leonowens	The King and I	Nominated	Kerr's singing voice was dubbed by Marni Nixon, who later went on to dub Natalie Wood (María) in West Side Story (1961) and Hepburn (Eliza) in My Fair Lady (1964).
1957	Deborah Kerr	(Scotland) (England)	Sister Angela	Heaven Knows, Mr. Allison	Nominated	
1957	Anna Magnani	(Italy)	Giòia	Wild is the Wind	Nominated	
1957	Elizabeth Taylor	(United Kingdom) (United States)	Susanna Drake	Raintree County	Nominated	
1958	Elizabeth Taylor	(United Kingdom) (United States)	Margaret "Maggie the Cat" Pollitt	Cat on a Hot Tin Roof	Nominated	
1958	Deborah Kerr	(Scotland) (England)	Sibyl Railton-Bell	Separate Tables	Nominated	
1959	Simone Signoret	(France)	Alice Aisgill	Room at the Top	Won	First actress to win an acting Oscar for a foreign production (from the UK; in English).
1959	Audrey Hepburn	(Belgium) (United Kingdom)	Gabrielle van der Mal (Sister Luke)	The Nun's Story	Nominated	
1959	Elizabeth Taylor	(United Kingdom) (United States)	Catherine Holly	Suddenly, Last Summer	Nominated	
1960	Elizabeth Taylor	(United Kingdom) (United States)	Gloria Wandrous	BUtterfield 8	Won	
1960	Melina Mercouri	(Greece)	Ilya	Never on Sunday	Nominated	First Greek actress nominated for an Oscar for a primarily Greek-language role.
1960	Deborah Kerr	(Scotland) (England)	Ida Carmody	The Sundowners	Nominated	Most nominated Scottish actress. With her six noms, Kerr holds the record in Best Actress for most female losses (six—tied with Thelma Ritter, who maintains that record in Supporting Actress; and Amy Adams, with five in supporting, one in lead). However, Glenn Close currently surpassed the female and overall record, with eight (four in each category), tying with Peter O'Toole. Kerr did receive an Honorary Academy Award in 1994–ironically presented by Close.
1960	Greer Garson	(United Kingdom) (England)	Eleanor Roosevelt	Sunrise at Campobello	Nominated	
1961	Sophia Loren	(Italy)	Cesira	Two Women	Won	First person to win an Academy Award for a performance spoken entirely in a non-English language. (Italian, in this instance.)
1961	Audrey Hepburn	(Belgium) (United Kingdom)	Holly Golightly (née Lula-Mae Barnes)	Breakfast at Tiffany's	Nominated	
1963	Leslie Caron	(France)	Jane Fosset	The L-Shaped Room	Nominated	
1963	Rachel Roberts	(Wales) (United Kingdom)	Margaret Hammond	This Sporting Life	Nominated	First Welsh actress nominated for an Oscar.
1964	Sophia Loren	(Italy)	Filumena Marturano	Marriage Italian Style	Nominated	
1964	Julie Andrews	(United Kingdom) (England)	Mary Poppins	Mary Poppins	Won	
1965	Julie Andrews	(United Kingdom) (England)	Maria von Trapp	The Sound of Music	Nominated	
1965	Samantha Eggar	(United Kingdom) (England)	Miranda Grey	The Collector	Nominated	
1965	Julie Christie	(England) (British Raj)	Diana Scott	Darling	Won	
1965	Simone Signoret	(France)	La Condesa	Ship of Fools	Nominated	
1966	Anouk Aimée	(France)	Anne Gauthier	A Man and a Woman	Nominated	
1966	Ida Kamińska	(Poland)	Rozália Lautmannová	The Shop on Main Street	Nominated	
1966	Elizabeth Taylor	(United Kingdom) (United States)	Martha	Who's Afraid of Virginia Woolf?	Won	
1966	Lynn Redgrave	(United Kingdom)	Georgina "Georgy" Parkin	Georgy Girl	Nominated	
1966	Vanessa Redgrave	(United Kingdom)	Leonie Delt	Morgan! – A Suitable Case for Treatment	Nominated	
1967	Edith Evans	(United Kingdom)	Maggie Ross	The Whisperers	Nominated	
1967	Audrey Hepburn	(Belgium) (United Kingdom)	Susy Hendrix	Wait Until Dark	Nominated	
1968	Vanessa Redgrave	(United Kingdom) (England)	Isadora Duncan	Isadora	Nominated	
1969	Maggie Smith	(United Kingdom) (England)	Jean Brodie	The Prime of Miss Jean Brodie	Won	
1969	Jean Simmons	(United Kingdom) (England)	Mary Wilson	The Happy Ending	Nominated	
1970	Glenda Jackson	(United Kingdom) (England)	Gudrun Brangwen	Women in Love	Won	
1970	Sarah Miles	(United Kingdom) (England)	Rosy Ryan	Ryan's Daughter	Nominated	
1971	Julie Christie	(United Kingdom) (England)	Constance Miller	McCabe & Mrs. Miller	Nominated	
1971	Glenda Jackson	(United Kingdom) (England)	Alex Greville	Sunday Bloody Sunday	Nominated	
1971	Vanessa Redgrave	(United Kingdom) (England)	Mary, Queen of Scots	Mary, Queen of Scots	Nominated	
1971	Janet Suzman	(United Kingdom) (South Africa)	Empress Alexandra of Russia	Nicholas and Alexandra	Nominated	
1972	Liv Ullmann	(Norway)	Kristina Nilsson	The Emigrants	Nominated	
1972	Maggie Smith	(United Kingdom) (England)	Augusta Bertram	Travels with My Aunt	Nominated	
1973	Glenda Jackson	(United Kingdom) (England)	Vickie Allessio	A Touch of Class	Won	
1975	Glenda Jackson	(United Kingdom) (England)	Hedda Gabler	Hedda	Nominated	
1975	Ann-Margret	(Sweden) (United States)	Nora Walker	Tommy	Nominated	
1975	Isabelle Adjani	(France)	Adele Hugo/Adele Lewly	The Story of Adele H.	Nominated	
1976	Marie-Christine Barrault	(France)	Marthe	Cousin Cousine	Nominated	
1976	Liv Ullmann	(Norway)	Jenny Isaksson	Face to Face	Nominated	
1978	Ingrid Bergman	(Sweden)	Charlotte Andergast	Autumn Sonata	Nominated	
1982	Julie Andrews	(United Kingdom) (England)	Victor Grazinski/Victoria Grant	Victor/Victoria	Nominated	
1983	Julie Walters	(United Kingdom) (England)	Susan White/Rita	Educating Rita	Nominated	
1984	Vanessa Redgrave	(United Kingdom) (England)	Olive Chancellor	The Bostonians	Nominated	
1989	Jessica Tandy	(United Kingdom) (England)	Daisy Werthan	Driving Miss Daisy	Won	
1989	Isabelle Adjani	(France)	Camille Claudel	Camille Claudel	Nominated	
1989	Pauline Collins	(United Kingdom) (England)	Shirley Valentine-Bradshaw	Shirley Valentine	Nominated	
1992	Emma Thompson	(United Kingdom) (England)	Margaret Schlegel	Howards End	Won	
1992	Catherine Deneuve	(France)	Eliane Devries	Indochine	Nominated	
1993	Emma Thompson	(United Kingdom) (England)	Sarah "Sally" Kenton	The Remains of the Day	Nominated	
1994	Miranda Richardson	(United Kingdom) (England)	Vivienne Haigh-Wood	Tom & Viv	Nominated	
1995	Emma Thompson	(United Kingdom) (England)	Elinor Dashwood	Sense and Sensibility	Nominated	
1996	Brenda Blethyn	(United Kingdom) (England)	Cynthia Rose Purley	Secrets & Lies	Nominated	
1996	Kristin Scott Thomas	(United Kingdom) (England) (France)	Katharine Clifton	The English Patient	Nominated	
1996	Emily Watson	(United Kingdom) (England)	Bess McNeill	Breaking the Waves	Nominated	
1997	Helena Bonham Carter	(United Kingdom) (England)	Kate Croy	The Wings of the Dove	Nominated	
1997	Julie Christie	(United Kingdom) (England)	Phyllis Hart	Afterglow	Nominated	
1997	Judi Dench	(United Kingdom) (England)	Queen Victoria	Mrs Brown	Nominated	
1997	Kate Winslet	(United Kingdom) (England)	Rose DeWitt Bukater	Titanic	Nominated	
1998	Emily Watson	(United Kingdom) (England)	Jacqueline du Pre	Hilary and Jackie	Nominated	
1999	Janet McTeer	(United Kingdom) (England)	Mary Jo Walker	Tumbleweeds	Nominated	
1999	Julianne Moore	(United States) (United Kingdom)	Sarah Miles	The End of the Affair	Nominated	
2000	Juliette Binoche	(France)	Vianne Rocher	Chocolat	Nominated	
2001	Judi Dench	(United Kingdom) (England)	Iris Murdoch	Iris	Nominated	
2002	Julianne Moore	(United States) (United Kingdom)	Cathy Whitaker	Far From Heaven	Nominated	
2003	Samantha Morton	(United Kingdom) (England)	Sarah Sullivan	In America	Nominated	
2003	Naomi Watts	(United Kingdom) (England)	Cristina Williams-Peck	21 Grams	Nominated	
2004	Imelda Staunton	(United Kingdom) (England)	Vera Rose Drake	Vera Drake	Nominated	
2004	Kate Winslet	(United Kingdom) (England)	Clementine Kruczynski	Eternal Sunshine of the Spotless Mind	Nominated	
2005	Judi Dench	(United Kingdom) (England)	Laura Forster-Henderson	Mrs. Henderson Presents	Nominated	
2005	Keira Knightley	(United Kingdom) (England)	Elizabeth Bennet	Pride & Prejudice	Nominated	
2006	Helen Mirren	(United Kingdom) (England)	Queen Elizabeth II	The Queen	Won	
2006	Penélope Cruz	(Spain)	Raimunda	Volver	Nominated	
2006	Judi Dench	(United Kingdom) (England)	Barbara Covett	Notes on a Scandal	Nominated	
2006	Kate Winslet	(United Kingdom) (England)	Sarah Pierce	Little Children	Nominated	
2007	Marion Cotillard	(France)	Edith Piaf	La Vie en Rose	Won	
2007	Julie Christie	(United Kingdom) (England)	Fiona Anderson	Away from Her	Nominated	
2008	Kate Winslet	(United Kingdom) (England)	Hanna Schmitz	The Reader	Won	
2009	Helen Mirren	(United Kingdom) (England)	Sophia Tolstaya	The Last Station	Nominated	
2009	Carey Mulligan	(United Kingdom) (England)	Jenny Mellor	An Education	Nominated	
2012	Emmanuelle Riva	(France)	Anne Laurent	Amour	Nominated	
2013	Judi Dench	(United Kingdom) (England)	Philomena Lee	Philomena	Nominated	
2014	Julianne Moore	(United States) (United Kingdom)	Alice Howrath	Still Alice	Won	
2014	Marion Cotillard	(France)	Sandra Bya	Two Days, One Night	Nominated	
2014	Felicity Jones	(United Kingdom) (England)	Jane Hawking	The Theory of Everything	Nominated	
2014	Rosamund Pike	(United Kingdom) (England)	Amy Elliott-Dunne/Nancy	Gone Girl	Nominated	
2015	Charlotte Rampling	(United Kingdom) (England)	Kate Mercer	45 Years	Nominated	
2015	Saoirse Ronan	(Republic of Ireland) (United States)	Eilis Lacey	Brooklyn	Nominated	
2016	Isabelle Huppert	(France)	Michele Leblanc	Elle	Nominated	
2016	Ruth Negga	(Republic of Ireland) (Ethiopia)	Mildred Loving	Loving	Nominated	First Black European actress nominated in the Leading category.
2017	Sally Hawkins	(United Kingdom) (England)	Elisa Esposito	The Shape of Water	Nominated	
2017	Saoirse Ronan	(Republic of Ireland) (United States)	Christine "Lady Bird" McPherson	Lady Bird	Nominated	
2018	Olivia Colman	(United Kingdom) (England)	Anne, Queen of Great Britain	The Favourite	Won	
2019	Cynthia Erivo	(United Kingdom) (England)	Harriet Tubman	Harriet	Nominated	
2019	Scarlett Johansson	(Denmark) (United States)	Nicole Barber	Marriage Story	Nominated	Holds dual Danish/American citizenship.
2019	Saoirse Ronan	(Republic of Ireland) (United States)	Josephine "Jo" March	Little Women	Nominated	
2020/ 2021	Vanessa Kirby	(United Kingdom) (England)	Martha Weiss	Pieces of a Woman	Nominated	
2020/ 2021	Carey Mulligan	(United Kingdom) (England)	Cassandra "Cassie" Thomas	Promising Young Woman	Nominated	
2021	Penélope Cruz	(Spain)	Janis Martinez Moreno	Parallel Mothers	Nominated	
2021	Olivia Colman	(United Kingdom) (England)	Lena Caruso	The Lost Daughter	Nominated	
2022	Andrea Riseborough	(United Kingdom) (England)	Leslie Rowlands	To Leslie	Nominated	
2022	Ana de Armas	(Cuba) (Spain)	Marilyn Monroe	Blonde	Nominated	Born in Cuba, at 18 she obtained the Spanish citizenship through her maternal grandparents.
2023	Sandra Hüller	(Germany)	Sandra Voyter	Anatomy of a Fall	Nominated	
2023	Carey Mulligan	(United Kingdom) (England)	Felicia Montealegre	Maestro	Nominated	
2024	Cynthia Erivo	(United Kingdom) (England)	Elphaba Thropp	Wicked	Nominated	
2024	Karla Sofía Gascón	(Spain)	Emilia Pérez / Juan "Manitas" Del Monte	Emilia Pérez	Nominated	First transgender actor nominated at the Oscars.
2025	Jessie Buckley	(Republic of Ireland)	Agnes Shakespeare	Hamnet	Won	
2025	Renate Reinsve	(Norway)	Nora Borg	Sentimental Value	Nominated	

== Best Actor in a Supporting Role ==
Best Actor in a Supporting Role
Year	Name	Country	Role	Film	Status	Milestone / Notes
1936	Mischa Auer	(Russia)	Carlo	My Man Godfrey	Nominated	
1936	Basil Rathbone	(United Kingdom) (South Africa)	Tybalt - Nephew to Lady Capulet	Romeo and Juliet	Nominated	
1937	Joseph Schildkraut	(Austria)	Captain Alfred Dreyfus	The Life of Emile Zola	Won	
1937	H.B. Warner	(United Kingdom) (England)	Chang	Lost Horizon	Nominated	
1937	Roland Young	(United Kingdom) (England)	Cosmo Topper	Topper	Nominated	
1938	Robert Morley	(United Kingdom) (England)	King Louis XVI	Marie Antoinette	Nominated	
1938	Basil Rathbone	(United Kingdom) (South Africa)	King Louis XI	If I Were King	Nominated	
1939	Brian Aherne	(United Kingdom) (England)	Emperor Maximilian von Habsburg	Juarez	Nominated	
1939	Claude Rains	(United Kingdom) (England)	Sen. Joseph Harrison Paine	Mr. Smith Goes to Washington	Nominated	
1940	Albert Bassermann	(Germany)	Van Meer	Foreign Correspondent	Nominated	
1940	James Stephenson	(United Kingdom) (England)	Howard Joyce	The Letter	Nominated	
1941	Donald Crisp	(United Kingdom) (England)	Gwilym Morgan	How Green Was My Valley	Won	
1941	Sydney Greenstreet	(United Kingdom) (England)	Kasper Gutman	The Maltese Falcon	Nominated	
1942	Henry Travers	(United Kingdom) (England)	James Ballard	Mrs. Miniver	Nominated	
1943	Claude Rains	(United Kingdom) (England)	Capt. Louis Renault	Casablanca	Nominated	
1944	Barry Fitzgerald	(Republic of Ireland)	Father Fitzgibbon	Going My Way	Won	
1944	Claude Rains	(United Kingdom) (England)	Job Skeffington	Mr. Skeffington	Nominated	
1945	Michael Chekhov	(Russia)	Dr. Alexander "Alex" Brulov	Spellbound	Nominated	
1946	Claude Rains	(United Kingdom) (England)	Alexander Sebastian	Notorious	Nominated	
1947	Edmund Gwenn	(United Kingdom) (England)	Kris Kringle	Miracle on 34th Street	Won	
1948	Oscar Homolka	(Austria)	Uncle Chris Halverson	I Remember Mama	Nominated	
1948	Cecil Kellaway	(United Kingdom) (South Africa)	Horace (A Leprechaun)	The Luck of the Irish	Nominated	
1949	Ralph Richardson	(United Kingdom) (England)	Dr. Austin Sloper	The Heiress	Nominated	
1950	George Sanders	(United Kingdom) (Russia)	Addison DeWitt	All About Eve	Won	
1950	Edmund Gwenn	(United Kingdom) (England)	"Skipper" Miller	Mister 880	Nominated	
1950	Erich von Stroheim	(Austria)	Max von Meyerling	Sunset Boulevard	Nominated	
1951	Leo Genn	(United Kingdom) (England)	Petronius	Quo Vadis	Nominated	
1951	Peter Ustinov	(United Kingdom) (Russia)	Nero	Quo Vadis	Nominated	
1952	Richard Burton	(United Kingdom) (Wales)	Phillip Ashley	My Cousin Rachel	Nominated	
1952	Victor McLaglen	(United Kingdom) (England)	Will "Red" Danaher	The Quiet Man	Nominated	
1957	Vittorio De Sica	(Italy)	Major Alessandro Rinaldi	A Farewell to Arms	Nominated	
1958	Theodore Bikel	(Austria)	Sheriff Max Muller	The Defiant Ones	Nominated	
1959	Hugh Griffith	(United Kingdom) (Wales)	Sheik Ilderim	Ben-Hur	Won	
1960	Peter Ustinov	(United Kingdom) (Russia)	Lentulus Batiatus	Spartacus	Won	
1962	Terence Stamp	(United Kingdom) (England)	Billy Budd	Billy Budd	Nominated	
1963	Hugh Griffith	(United Kingdom) (Wales)	Squire Western	Tom Jones	Nominated	
1964	Peter Ustinov	(United Kingdom) (Russia)	Arthur Simon Simpson	Topkapi	Won	
1964	John Gielgud	(United Kingdom) (England)	Louis VII of France	Becket	Nominated	
1964	Stanley Holloway	(United Kingdom) (England)	Alfred Doolittle	My Fair Lady	Nominated	
1965	Ian Bannen	(United Kingdom) (England)	"Ratbags" Crow	The Flight of the Phoenix	Nominated	
1965	Tom Courtenay	(United Kingdom) (England)	Pasha Antipov (Strelnikov)	Doctor Zhivago	Nominated	
1965	Frank Finlay	(United Kingdom) (England)	Iago	Othello	Nominated	
1966	James Mason	(United Kingdom) (England)	James Leamington	Georgy Girl	Nominated	
1966	Robert Shaw	(United Kingdom) (England)	Henry VIII of England	A Man for All Seasons	Nominated	
1967	Cecil Kellaway	(United Kingdom) (South Africa)	Monsignor Mike Ryan	Guess Who's Coming to Dinner	Nominated	
1968	Daniel Massey	(United Kingdom) (England)	Noël Coward	Star!	Nominated	
1968	Gene Wilder	(Russia)	Leopold "Leo" Bloom	The Producers	Nominated	
1968	Jack Wild	(United Kingdom) (England)	The Artful Dodger	Oliver!	Nominated	
1969	Anthony Quayle	(United Kingdom) (England)	Cardinal Wolsey	Anne of the Thousand Days	Nominated	
1970	John Mills	(United Kingdom) (England)	Michael	Ryan's Daughter	Won	
1973	John Houseman	(Romania) (United Kingdom)	Charles W. Kingsfield Jr.	The Paper Chase	Won	
1973	Vincent Gardenia	(Italy)	Dutch Schnell	Bang the Drum Slowly	Nominated	
1974	Robert De Niro	(Italy) (United States)	Vito Corleone	The Godfather Part II	Won	Born in the United States but became Italian citizen in 2006.
1974	Lee Strasberg	(Poland)	Hyman Roth	The Godfather Part II	Nominated	
1976	Laurence Olivier	(United Kingdom) (England)	Dr. Christian Szell	Marathon Man	Nominated	
1977	Mikhail Baryshnikov	(Latvia) (Russia)	Yuri Kopeikine	The Turning Point	Nominated	
1977	Peter Firth	(United Kingdom) (England)	Alan Strang	Equus	Nominated	
1977	Alec Guinness	(United Kingdom) (England)	Obi-Wan Kenobi	Star Wars	Nominated	
1977	Maximilian Schell	(Austria) (Switzerland)	Johann	Julia	Nominated	
1978	John Hurt	(United Kingdom) (England)	Max	Midnight Express	Nominated	
1981	John Gielgud	(United Kingdom) (England)	Hobson	Arthur	Won	
1981	Ian Holm	(United Kingdom) (England)	Sam Mussabini	Chariots of Fire	Nominated	
1982	James Mason	(United Kingdom) (England)	Ed Concannon	The Verdict	Nominated	
1984	Ralph Richardson	(United Kingdom) (England)	The Sixth Earl of Greystoke	Greystoke: The Legend of Tarzan, Lord of the Apes	Nominated	
1985	Klaus Maria Brandauer	(Austria)	Baron Bror von Blixen-Finecke; Baron Hans von Blixen-Finecke	Out of Africa	Nominated	
1986	Michael Caine	(United Kingdom) (England)	Elliott Daniels	Hannah and Her Sisters	Won	
1986	Denholm Elliott	(United Kingdom) (England)	Mr. Emerson	A Room with a View	Nominated	
1987	Sean Connery	(United Kingdom) (Scotland)	Jimmy Malone	The Untouchables	Won	
1987	Vincent Gardenia	(Italy)	Cosmo Castorini	Moonstruck	Nominated	
1988	Alec Guinness	(United Kingdom) (England)	William Dorrit	Little Dorrit	Nominated	
1991	Ben Kingsley	(United Kingdom) (England)	Meyer Lansky	Bugsy	Nominated	
1992	Jaye Davidson	(United Kingdom) (United States)	Dil	The Crying Game	Nominated	
1993	Ralph Fiennes	(United Kingdom) (England)	Amon Goeth	Schindler's List	Nominated	
1993	Pete Postlethwaite	(United Kingdom) (England)	Giuseppe Conlon	In the Name of the Father	Nominated	
1994	Paul Scofield	(United Kingdom) (England)	Mark Van Doren	Quiz Show	Nominated	
1995	Tim Roth	(United Kingdom) (England)	Archibald Cunningham	Rob Roy	Nominated	
1996	Armin Mueller-Stahl	(Germany)	Peter Helfgott	Shine	Nominated	
1997	Anthony Hopkins	(United Kingdom) (Wales)	John Quincy Adams	Amistad	Nominated	
1999	Michael Caine	(United Kingdom) (England)	Dr. Wilbur Larch	The Cider House Rules	Won	
1999	Jude Law	(United Kingdom) (England)	Dickie Greenleaf	The Talented Mr. Ripley	Nominated	
2000	Albert Finney	(United Kingdom) (England)	Edward L. Masry	Erin Brockovich	Nominated	
2000	Benicio Del Toro	(Puerto Rico) (United States) (Spain)	Javier Rodriguez	Traffic	Won	Born in Puerto Rico. Holds dual Spanish and American citizenship.
2001	Jim Broadbent	(United Kingdom) (England)	John Bayley	Iris	Won	
2001	Ben Kingsley	(United Kingdom) (England)	Don Logan	Sexy Beast	Nominated	
2001	Ian McKellen	(United Kingdom) (England)	Gandalf the Grey	The Lord of the Rings: The Fellowship of the Ring	Nominated	
2003	Benicio Del Toro	(Puerto Rico) (United States) (Spain)	Jack Jordan	21 Grams	Nominated	
2004	Clive Owen	(United Kingdom) (England)	Larry Gray	Closer	Nominated	
2005	George Clooney	(France) (United States)	Bob Barnes	Syriana	Won	Born in the United States but became French citizen in 2025.
2007	Javier Bardem	(Spain)	Anton Chigurh	No Country for Old Men	Won	
2007	Tom Wilkinson	(United Kingdom) (England)	Arthur Edens	Michael Clayton	Nominated	
2009	Christoph Waltz	(Austria) (Germany)	SS Colonel Hans Landa	Inglourious Basterds	Won	
2010	Christian Bale	(United Kingdom) (Wales)	Dicky Eklund	The Fighter	Won	
2011	Kenneth Branagh	(Republic of Ireland) (United Kingdom)	Laurence Olivier	My Week with Marilyn	Nominated	
2011	Max von Sydow	(Sweden) (France)	The Renter	Extremely Loud & Incredibly Close	Nominated	First Swedish actor, and Swedish-language performance, to be nominated for an Oscar. Later he held dual Swedish/French citizneship.
2012	Christoph Waltz	(Austria) (Germany)	Dr. King Schultz	Django Unchained	Won	
2012	Robert De Niro	(Italy) (United States)	Patrizio "Pat" Solitano Sr.	Silver Linings Playbook	Nominated	
2013	Michael Fassbender	(Republic of Ireland) (Germany)	Edwin Epps	12 Years a Slave	Nominated	
2015	Christian Bale	(United Kingdom) (Wales)	Michael Burry	The Big Short	Nominated	
2015	Mark Rylance	(United Kingdom) (England)	Rudolf Abel	Bridge of Spies	Won	
2015	Tom Hardy	(United Kingdom) (England)	John Fitzgerald	The Revenant	Nominated	
2016	Dev Patel	(United Kingdom) (England)	Saroo Brierley	Lion	Nominated	
2018	Richard E. Grant	(United Kingdom) (Eswatini)	Jack Hock	Can You Ever Forgive Me?	Nominated	
2019	Anthony Hopkins	(United Kingdom) (Wales)	Pope Benedict XVI	The Two Popes	Nominated	
2020/2021	Daniel Kaluuya	(United Kingdom) (England)	Fred Hampton	Judas and the Black Messiah	Won	
2020/2021	Sacha Baron Cohen	(United Kingdom) (England)	Abbie Hoffman	The Trial of the Chicago 7	Nominated	
2021	Ciarán Hinds	(Republic of Ireland) (United Kingdom)	"Pop"	Belfast	Nominated	
2022	Brendan Gleeson	(Republic of Ireland)	Colm Doherty	The Banshees of Inisherin	Nominated	
2022	Barry Keoghan	(Republic of Ireland)	Dominic Kearney	The Banshees of Inisherin	Nominated	
2023	Robert De Niro	(Italy) (United States)	William King Hale	Killers of the Flower Moon	Nominated	
2024	Yura Borisov	(Russia)	Igor	Anora	Nominated	
2024	Guy Pearce	(United Kingdom) (Australia)	Harrison Lee Van Buren	The Brutalist	Nominated	
2025	Benicio Del Toro	(Puerto Rico) (United States) (Spain)	Sergio St. Carlos	One Battle After Another	Nominated	
2025	Stellan Skarsgard	(Sweden)	Gustav Borg	Sentimental Value	Nominated	
2025	Delroy Lindo	(United Kingdom) (United States)	Delta Slim	Sinners	Nominated	

== Best Actress in a Supporting Role ==
Best Actress in a Supporting Role
Year	Name	Country	Role	Film	Status	Milestone / Notes
1936	Maria Ouspenskaya	(Russia)	Baroness von Obersdorf	Dodsworth	Nominated	
1937	May Whitty	(United Kingdom) (England)	Mrs. Bramson	Night Must Fall	Nominated	
1938	Miliza Korjus	(Poland) (Estonia)	Carla Donner	The Great Waltz	Nominated	
1939	Olivia de Havilland	(United Kingdom) (England)	Melanie Hamilton	Gone With the Wind	Nominated	
1939	Geraldine Fitzgerald	(Republic of Ireland)	Isabella Linton	Wuthering Heights	Nominated	
1939	Maria Ouspenskaya	(Russia)	Grandmother Janou	Love Affair	Nominated	
1941	Sara Allgood	(Republic of Ireland)	Beth Morgan	How Green Was My Valley	Nominated	
1941	Patricia Collinge	(Republic of Ireland)	Birdie Bagtry-Hubbard	The Little Foxes	Nominated	
1941	Margaret Wycherly	(United Kingdom) (England)	Mary Brooks-York	Sergeant York	Nominated	
1942	Gladys Cooper	(United Kingdom) (England)	Mrs. Vale	Now, Voyager	Nominated	
1942	May Whitty	(United Kingdom) (England)	Lady Beldon	Mrs. Miniver	Nominated	
1943	Katina Paxinou	(Greece)	Pilar	For Whom the Bell Tolls	Won	
1943	Gladys Cooper	(United Kingdom) (England)	Marie-Thérèse Vauzou	The Song of Bernadette	Nominated	
1944	Angela Lansbury	(United Kingdom) (England)	Nancy Oliver	Gaslight	Nominated	
1945	Angela Lansbury	(United Kingdom) (England)	Sibyl Vane	The Picture of Dorian Gray	Nominated	
1946	Flora Robson	(United Kingdom) (England)	Angelique Buiton	Saratoga Trunk	Nominated	
1948	Jean Simmons	(United Kingdom) (England)	Ophelia	Hamlet	Nominated	
1949	Elsa Lanchester	(United Kingdom) (England)	Amelia Potts	Come to the Stable	Nominated	
1952	Colette Marchand	(France)	Marie Charlet	Moulin Rouge	Nominated	
1954	Nina Foch	(Netherlands)	Erica Martin	Executive Suite	Nominated	
1955	Marisa Pavan	(Italy)	Rosa Delle Rose	The Rose Tattoo	Nominated	
1957	Elsa Lanchester	(United Kingdom) (England)	Miss Plimsoll	Witness for the Prosecution	Nominated	
1958	Wendy Hiller	(United Kingdom) (England)	Pat Cooper	Separate Tables	Nominated	
1959	Hermione Baddeley	(United Kingdom) (England)	Elspeth	Room at the Top	Nominated	
1960	Glynis Johns	(United Kingdom) (South Africa)	Mrs. Firth	The Sundowners	Nominated	
1960	Mary Ure	(United Kingdom) (Scotland)	Clara Dawes	Sons and Lovers	Nominated	
1961	Lotte Lenya	(Austria)	Magda Terribili-Gonzales	The Roman Spring of Mrs. Stone	Nominated	
1962	Angela Lansbury	(United Kingdom) (England)	Eleanor Iselin	The Manchurian Candidate	Nominated	
1963	Margaret Rutherford	(United Kingdom) (England)	The Duchess of Brighton	The V.I.P.s	Won	
1963	Edith Evans	(United Kingdom) (England)	Miss Western	Tom Jones	Nominated	
1963	Joyce Redman	(United Kingdom) (Republic of Ireland)	Mrs. Waters/Jenny Jones	Tom Jones	Nominated	
1963	Lilia Skala	(Austria)	Mother Maria Marthe	Lilies of the Field	Nominated	
1964	Lila Kedrova	(Russia) (France)	Madame Hortense	Zorba the Greek	Won	Born in Russia, she moved to France in 1928.
1964	Gladys Cooper	(United Kingdom) (England)	Mrs. Higgins	My Fair Lady	Nominated	
1964	Edith Evans	(United Kingdom) (England)	Mrs. St. Maugham	The Chalk Garden	Nominated	
1965	Joyce Redman	(United Kingdom) (Republic of Ireland)	Emilia	Othello	Nominated	
1965	Maggie Smith	(United Kingdom) (England)	Desdemona	Othello	Nominated	
1966	Wendy Hiller	(United Kingdom) (England)	Alice More	A Man for All Seasons	Nominated	
1966	Vivien Merchant	(United Kingdom) (England)	Lily Clamacraft	Alfie	Nominated	
1966	Jocelyne LaGarde	(France) (French Polynesia)	Malama Kanakoa	Hawaii	Nominated	As a Tahitian, LaGarde was the first indigenous person to be nominated in any acting category.
1969	Susannah York	(United Kingdom) (England)	Alice LeBlanc	They Shoot Horses, Don't They?	Nominated	
1971	Margaret Leighton	(United Kingdom) (England)	Mrs. Maudsley	The Go-Between	Nominated	
1971	Ann-Margret	(Sweden) (United States)	Bobbie	Carnal Knowledge	Nominated	
1974	Valentina Cortese	(Italy)	Severine	Day for Night	Nominated	
1974	Ingrid Bergman	(Sweden)	Greta Ohlsson	Murder on the Orient Express	Won	
1977	Vanessa Redgrave	(United Kingdom) (England)	Julia	Julia	Nominated	
1978	Maggie Smith	(United Kingdom) (England)	Diana Barrie	California Suite	Won	
1984	Peggy Ashcroft	(United Kingdom) (England)	Mrs. Moore	A Passage to India	Won	
1986	Maggie Smith	(United Kingdom) (England)	Charlotte Bartlett	A Room with a View	Nominated	
1989	Brenda Fricker	(Republic of Ireland)	Bridget Fagan-Brown	My Left Foot	Won	
1991	Jessica Tandy	(United Kingdom) (England)	Virginia "Ninny" Threadgoode	Fried Green Tomatoes	Nominated	
1992	Joan Plowright	(United Kingdom) (England)	Mrs. Fisher	Enchanted April	Nominated	
1992	Vanessa Redgrave	(United Kingdom) (England)	Ruth Wilcox	Howards End	Nominated	
1992	Miranda Richardson	(United Kingdom) (England)	Ingrid Thompson-Fleming	Damage	Nominated	
1993	Emma Thompson	(United Kingdom) (England)	Gareth Peirce	In the Name of the Father	Nominated	
1994	Rosemary Harris	(United Kingdom) (England)	Rose Haigh-Wood	Tom & Viv	Nominated	
1994	Helen Mirren	(United Kingdom) (England)	Queen Charlotte	The Madness of King George	Nominated	
1995	Kate Winslet	(United Kingdom) (England)	Marianne Dashwood	Sense and Sensibility	Nominated	
1996	Juliette Binoche	(France)	Hana	The English Patient	Won	
1996	Marianne Jean-Baptiste	(United Kingdom) (England)	Hortense Cumberbatch	Secrets & Lies	Nominated	
1997	Minnie Driver	(United Kingdom) (England)	Skylar	Good Will Hunting	Nominated	
1997	Julianne Moore	(United States) (United Kingdom)	Maggie / Amber Waves	Boogie Nights	Nominated	
1998	Judi Dench	(United Kingdom) (England)	Queen Elizabeth I	Shakespeare in Love	Won	
1998	Brenda Blethyn	(United Kingdom) (England)	Mari Hoff	Little Voice	Nominated	
1998	Lynn Redgrave	(United Kingdom) (England)	Hanna	Gods and Monsters	Nominated	
1999	Samantha Morton	(United Kingdom) (England)	Hattie	Sweet and Lowdown	Nominated	
2000	Judi Dench	(United Kingdom) (England)	Amande Voizin	Chocolat	Nominated	
2000	Julie Walters	(United Kingdom) (England)	Georgia Wilkinson	Billy Elliot	Nominated	
2001	Helen Mirren	(United Kingdom) (England)	Mrs. Wilson	Gosford Park	Nominated	
2001	Maggie Smith	(United Kingdom) (England)	Constance Trentham	Gosford Park	Nominated	
2001	Kate Winslet	(United Kingdom) (England)	Iris Murdoch	Iris	Nominated	
2002	Catherine Zeta-Jones	(United Kingdom) (Wales)	Velma Kelly	Chicago	Won	
2002	Julianne Moore	(United States) (United Kingdom)	Laura Brown	The Hours	Nominated	
2004	Sophie Okonedo	(United Kingdom) (England)	Tatiana Rusesabagina	Hotel Rwanda	Nominated	
2005	Rachel Weisz	(United Kingdom) (England)	Tessa Quayle	The Constant Gardener	Won	
2007	Tilda Swinton	(United Kingdom) (England)	Karen Crowder	Michael Clayton	Won	
2007	Saoirse Ronan	(Republic of Ireland) (United States)	Briony Tallis	Atonement	Nominated	
2008	Penélope Cruz	(Spain)	Maria Elena	Vicky Cristina Barcelona	Won	
2009	Penélope Cruz	(Spain)	Carla Albanese	Nine	Nominated	
2010	Helena Bonham Carter	(United Kingdom) (England)	Queen Elizabeth	The King's Speech	Nominated	
2011	Berenice Bejo	(France) (Argentina)	Peppy Miller	The Artist	Nominated	Born in Argentina she has 3 years old when her family moves to France escaping from the Argentina's most recent civil-military dictatorship (1976–1983)
2011	Janet McTeer	(United Kingdom) (England)	Hubert Page	Albert Nobbs	Nominated	
2013	Sally Hawkins	(United Kingdom) (England)	Ginger	Blue Jasmine	Nominated	
2014	Keira Knightley	(United Kingdom) (England)	Joan Clarke	The Imitation Game	Nominated	
2015	Alicia Vikander	(Sweden)	Gerda Wegener	The Danish Girl	Won	
2015	Kate Winslet	(United Kingdom) (England)	Joanna Hoffman	Steve Jobs	Nominated	
2016	Naomie Harris	(United Kingdom) (England)	Paula Harris	Moonlight	Nominated	
2017	Lesley Manville	(United Kingdom) (England)	Cyril Woodcock	Phantom Thread	Nominated	
2018	Rachel Weisz	(United Kingdom) (England)	Sarah Churchill	The Favourite	Nominated	
2019	Florence Pugh	(United Kingdom) (England)	Amy March	Little Women	Nominated	
2019	Scarlett Johansson	(Denmark) (United States)	Rosie Betzler	Jojo Rabbit	Nominated	Holds dual Danish/American citizenship.
2020/2021	Maria Bakalova	(Bulgaria)	Tutar Sagdiyev	Borat Subsequent Moviefilm	Nominated	
2020/2021	Olivia Colman	(United Kingdom) (England)	Anne	The Father	Nominated	
2021	Judi Dench	(United Kingdom) (England)	"Granny"	Belfast	Nominated	
2021	Kirsten Dunst	(United States) (Germany)	Rose Gordon	The Power of the Dog	Nominated	Holds dual German/American citizneship.
2021	Jessie Buckley	(Republic of Ireland)	Young Leda Caruso	The Lost Daughter	Nominated	
2022	Kerry Condon	(Republic of Ireland)	Siobhán Súilleabháin	The Banshees of Inisherin	Nominated	
2023	Emily Blunt	(United Kingdom) (England)	Katherine Oppenheimer	Oppenheimer	Nominated	
2024	Felicity Jones	(United Kingdom) (England)	Erzsébet Tóth	The Brutalist	Nominated	
2024	Isabella Rossellini	(Italy)	Sister Agnes	Conclave	Nominated	
2025	Inga Ibsdotter Lilleaas	(Norway)	Agnes Borg Pettersen	Sentimental Value	Nominated	
2025	Wunmi Mosaku	(United Kingdom) (Nigeria)	Annie	Sinners	Nominated	

== Best Original Screenplay ==
Best Original Screenplay
Year	Name	Country	Film	Status	Milestone / Notes
1940	Charles Bennett and Joan Harrison	(United Kingdom) (England)	Foreign Correspondent	Nominated	
1940	Charlie Chaplin	(United Kingdom) (England)	The Great Dictator	Nominated	
1942	Michael Powell and Emeric Pressburger	(United Kingdom) (England) / (Hungary)	One of Our Aircraft Is Missing	Nominated	
1943	Noël Coward	(United Kingdom) (England)	In Which We Serve	Nominated	
1945	Richard Schweizer	(Switzerland)	Marie-Louise	Won	
1946	Muriel Box and Sydney Box	(United Kingdom) (England)	The Seventh Veil	Won	
1946	Raymond Chandler	(United States) (United Kingdom)	The Blue Dahlia	Nominated	
1946	Jacques Prevert	(France)	Children of Paradise	Nominated	
1947	Charlie Chaplin	(United Kingdom) (England)	Monsieur Verdoux	Nominated	
1947	Sergio Amidei, Adolfo Franci, Cesare Giulio Viola and Cesare Zavattini	(Italy)	Shoeshine	Nominated	
1949	Sergio Amidei, Federico Fellini, Alfred Hayes, Marcello Pagliero and Roberto Rossellini	(Italy) / (United Kingdom) (England)	Paisan	Nominated	
1949	T. E. B. Clarke	(United Kingdom) (England)	Passport to Pimlico	Nominated	
1950	Billy Wilder	(Austria)	Sunset Boulevard	Won	
1951	Billy Wilder	(Austria)	The Big Carnival	Nominated	
1952	T. E. B. Clarke	(United Kingdom) (England)	The Lavender Hill Mob	Nominated	
1952	Terence Rattigan	(United Kingdom) (England)	Breaking the Sound Barrier	Nominated	
1953	Walter Reisch	(Austria)	Titanic	Won	
1955	Sonya Levien	(Russia)	Interrupted Melody	Won	
1955	Henri Marquet and Jacques Tati	(France)	Mr. Hulot's Holiday	Nominated	
1956	Albert Lamorisse	(France)	The Red Balloon	Won	
1956	Federico Fellini and Tullio Pinelli	(Italy)	La Strada	Nominated	
1957	Federico Fellini, Ennio Flaiano and Tullio Pinelli	(Italy)	I Vitelloni	Nominated	
1959	Marcel Moussy and François Truffaut	(France)	The 400 Blows	Nominated	
1959	Ingmar Bergman	(Sweden)	Wild Strawberries	Nominated	
1960	I.A.L. Diamond and Billy Wilder	(Romania) (United States) / (Austria)	The Apartment	Won	
1960	Bryan Forbes, Michael Craig and Richard Gregson	(United Kingdom) (England)	The Angry Silence	Nominated	
1960	Marguerite Duras	(France)	Hiroshima, Mon Amour	Nominated	
1961	Grigori Chukhrai and Valentin Yezhov	(Russia)	Ballad of a Soldier	Nominated	
1961	Sergio Amidei, Diego Fabbi and Indro Montanelli	(Italy)	General Della Rovere	Nominated	
1961	Federico Fellini, Ennio Flaiano, Tullio Pinelli, and Brunello Rondi	(Italy)	La Dolce Vita	Nominated	
1962	Ennio De Concini, Pietro Germi, and Alfredo Giannetti	(Italy)	Divorce Italian Style	Won	
1962	Wolfgang Reinhardt	(Germany)	Freud	Nominated	
1962	Alain Robbe-Grillet	(France)	Last Year at Marienbad	Nominated	
1962	Ingmar Bergman	(Sweden)	Through a Glass Darkly	Nominated	
1963	Elia Kazan	(Greece)	America America	Nominated	
1963	Federico Fellini, Ennio Flaiano, Tullio Pinelli, and Brunello Rondi	(Italy)	8 1/2	Nominated	
1963	Carlo Bernari, Pasquale Festa Campanile, Massimo Franciosa, Nanni Loy, and Vasco Pratolini	(Italy)	The Four Days of Naples	Nominated	
1964	Alun Owen	(United Kingdom) (Wales)	A Hard Day's Night	Nominated	
1964	Age, Mario Monicelli, and Furio Scarpelli	(Italy)	The Organizer	Nominated	
1964	Daniel Boulanger, Philipe de Broca, Ariane Mnouchkine, and Jean-Paul Rappeneau	(France)	That Man from Rio	Nominated	
1965	Frederic Raphael	(United States) (United Kingdom)	Darling	Won	
1965	Age, Suso Cecchi d'Amico, Tonino Guerra, Mario Monicelli, Giorgio Salvioni, and Furio Scarpelli	(Italy)	Casanova 70	Nominated	
1965	Ken Annakin and Jack Davies	(United Kingdom) (England)	Those Magnificent Men in their Flying Machines	Nominated	
1965	Jacques Demy	(France)	The Umbrellas of Cherbourg	Nominated	
1966	Claude Lelouch and Pierre Uytterhoeven	(France)	A Man and a Woman	Won	
1966	Michelangelo Antonioni, Edward Bond, and Tonino Guerra	(Italy) / (United Kingdom) (England)	Blowup	Nominated	
1966	I.A.L. Diamond and Billy Wilder	(Romania) (United States) / (Austria)	The Fortune Cookie	Nominated	
1967	Jorge Semprún	(Spain)	La Guerre Est Finie	Nominated	
1967	Frederic Raphael	(United Kingdom)	Two for the Road	Nominated	
1968	Gillo Pontecorvo and Franco Solinas	(Italy)	The Battle of Algiers	Nominated	
1968	Peter Ustinov	(United Kingdom) (Russia)	Hot Millions	Nominated	
1968	Arthur C. Clarke	(United Kingdom) (England)	2001: A Space Odyssey	Nominated	
1969	Nicola Badalucco, Enrico Medioli, and Luchino Visconti	(Italy)	The Damned	Nominated	
1970	Eric Rohmer	(France)	My Night at Maud's	Nominated	
1971	Elio Petri and Ugo Pirro	(Italy)	Investigation of a Citizen Above Suspicion	Nominated	
1971	Penelope Gilliatt	(United Kingdom) (England)	Sunday Bloody Sunday	Nominated	
1972	Luis Buñuel and Jean-Claude Carriere	(Spain) / (France)	The Discreet Charm of the Bourgeoisie	Nominated	
1972	Louis Malle	(France)	Murmur of the Heart	Nominated	
1973	Ingmar Bergman	(Sweden)	Cries and Whispers	Nominated	
1974	Jean-Louis Richard, Suzanne Schiffman, and François Truffaut	(France)	Day for Night	Nominated	
1975	Claude Lelouch and Pierre Uytterhoeven	(France)	And Now My Love	Nominated	
1975	Federico Fellini and Tonino Guerra	(Italy)	Amarcord	Nominated	
1976	Lina Wertmuller	(Italy)	Seven Beauties	Nominated	
1976	Jean-Charles Tacchella and Daniele Thompson	(France) (Monaco)	Cousin, Cousine	Nominated	
1978	Ingmar Bergman	(Sweden)	Autumn Sonata	Nominated	
1978	Michael Cimino	(Italy)	The Deer Hunter	Nominated	
1979	Steve Tesich	(Serbia) (United States)	Breaking Away	Won	
1980	Jean Gruault	(France)	Mon oncle d'Amerique	Nominated	
1981	Colin Welland	(United Kingdom) (England)	Chariots of Fire	Won	
1981	Trevor Griffiths	(United Kingdom) (England)	Reds	Nominated	
1984	Anna Thomas	(Germany)	El Norte	Nominated	
1985	Terry Gilliam, Charles McKeown, and Tom Stoppard	(United Kingdom) (England) / (Czech Republic) (United Kingdom)	Brazil	Nominated	
1986	Hanif Kureishi	(United Kingdom) (England)	My Beautiful Laundrette	Nominated	
1987	Louis Malle	(France)	Au Revoir Les Enfants	Nominated	
1987	John Boorman	(United Kingdom) (England)	Hope and Glory	Nominated	
1988	John Cleese and Charles Crichton	(United Kingdom) (England)	A Fish Called Wanda	Nominated	
1992	Neil Jordan	(Republic of Ireland)	The Crying Game	Won	
1994	Richard Curtis	(United Kingdom) (England)	Four Weddings and a Funeral	Nominated	
1994	Krzysztof Kieślowski and Krzysztof Piesiewicz	(Poland)	Three Colours: Red	Nominated	
1996	Mike Leigh	(United Kingdom) (England)	Secrets & Lies	Nominated	
1997	Simon Beaufoy	(United Kingdom) (England)	The Full Monty	Nominated	
1998	Tom Stoppard	(Czech Republic) (United Kingdom)	Shakespeare in Love	Won	
1998	Roberto Benigni and Vincenzo Cerami	(Italy)	Life is Beautiful	Nominated	
1999	Mike Leigh	(United Kingdom) (England)	Topsy-Turvy	Nominated	
2000	Lee Hall	(United Kingdom) (England)	Billy Elliot	Nominated	
2000	William Nicholson	(United Kingdom) (England)	Gladiator	Nominated	
2001	Julian Fellowes	(United Kingdom) (England)	Gosford Park	Won	
2001	Jean-Pierre Jeunet and Guillaume Laurant	(France)	Amelie	Nominated	
2001	Christopher Nolan and Jonathan Nolan	(United Kingdom) (England)	Memento	Nominated	
2002	Pedro Almodóvar	(Spain)	Talk to Her	Won	
2003	Steven Knight	(United Kingdom) (England)	Dirty Pretty Things	Nominated	
2003	Steven Zaillian	(Armenia)	Gangs of New York	Nominated	
2003	Jim Sheridan, Kirsten Sheridan, and Naomi Sheridan	(Republic of Ireland)	In America	Nominated	
2004	Terry George	(Republic of Ireland)	Hotel Rwanda	Nominated	
2004	Pierre Bismuth and Michel Gondry	(France)	Eternal Sunshine of the Spotless Mind	Won	
2004	Mike Leigh	(United Kingdom) (England)	Vera Drake	Nominated	
2005	George Clooney	(France) (United States)	Good Night, and Good Luck	Nominated	He acquired the French citizenship in 2025.
2006	Peter Morgan	(United Kingdom) (England)	The Queen	Nominated	
2007	Jan Pinkava	(Czech Republic) (United Kingdom)	Ratatouille	Nominated	
2008	Mike Leigh	(United Kingdom) (England)	Happy-Go-Lucky	Nominated	
2008	Martin McDonagh	(Republic of Ireland) (United Kingdom)	In Bruges	Nominated	
2009	Alessandro Camon	(Italy)	The Messenger	Nominated	
2010	David Seidler	(United Kingdom) (England)	The King's Speech	Won	
2010	Mike Leigh	(United Kingdom) (England)	Another Year	Nominated	
2010	Christopher Nolan	(United Kingdom) (England)	Inception	Nominated	
2011	Michel Hazanavicius	(France)	The Artist	Nominated	
2012	Michael Haneke	(Austria)	Amour	Nominated	
2014	Hugo Guinness	(United Kingdom) (England)	The Grand Budapest Hotel	Nominated	
2015	Matt Charman	(United Kingdom) (England)	Bridge of Spies	Nominated	
2015	Alex Garland	(United Kingdom) (England)	Ex Machina	Nominated	
2016	Damien Chazelle	(France) (United States)	La La Land	Nominated	
2016	Efthimis Filippou and Yorgos Lanthimos	(Greece)	The Lobster	Nominated	
2017	Martin McDonagh	(Republic of Ireland) (United Kingdom)	Three Billboards Outside Ebbing, Missouri	Nominated	
2019	Sam Mendes and Krysty Wilson-Cairns	(United Kingdom) (England) / (United Kingdom) (Scotland)	1917	Nominated	
2020/2021	Emerald Fennell	(United Kingdom) (England)	Promising Young Woman	Won	
2021	Kenneth Branagh	(Republic of Ireland) (United Kingdom)	Belfast	Won	
2021	Eskil Vogt and Joachim Trier	(Norway)	The Worst Person in the World	Nominated	
2022	Martin McDonagh	(Republic of Ireland) (United Kingdom)	The Banshees of Inisherin	Nominated	
2022	Ruben Östlund	(Sweden)	Triangle of Sadness	Nominated	
2023	Justine Triet and Arthur Harari	(France)	Anatomy of a Fall	Won	
2024	Mona Fastvold	(Norway)	The Brutalist	Nominated	Shared with Brady Corbet
2024	Jesse Eisenberg	(Poland) / (United States)	A Real Pain	Nominated	
2024	Moritz Binder and Tim Fehlbaum	(Germany) / (Switzerland)	September 5	Nominated	Shared with Alex David
2024	Coralie Fargeat	(France)	The Substance	Nominated	
2025	Eskil Vogt and Joachim Trier	(Norway)	Sentimental Value	Nominated	

== Best Adapted Screenplay ==
During certain ceremonies the Oscars only gave out one screenplay awards. If a screenplay is original, it will be noted as such.

Best Adapted Screenplay
Year	Name	Country	Film	Status	Milestone / Notes
1929	Hanns Kräly	(Germany)	The Patriot	Won	
1929	Hanns Kräly	(Germany)	The Last of Mrs. Cheyney	Nominated	
1932	Samuel Hoffenstein	(Russia)	Dr. Jekyll and Mr. Hyde	Nominated	
1933	Sonya Levien	(Russia)	State Fair	Nominated	
1933	Victor Heerman	(United Kingdom) (England)	Little Women	Won	
1937	Heinz Herald and Géza Herczeg	(Poland) / (Hungary)	The Life of Emile Zola	Won	
1938	George Bernard Shaw, Ian Dalrympe, Cecil Arthur Lewis, and W. P. Lipscomb	(Republic of Ireland) / (United Kingdom) (England)	Pygmalion	Won	
1939	Holt Marvell, R. C. Sherriff, and Claudine West	(United Kingdom) (England)	Goodbye, Mr. Chips	Nominated	
1939	Walter Reisch and Billy Wilder	(Austria)	Ninotchka	Nominated	
1940	Joan Harrison	(United Kingdom) (England)	Rebecca	Nominated	
1941	Billy Wilder	(Austria)	Hold Back the Dawn	Nominated	
1942	George Froeschel, James Hilton, Claudine West, and Arthur Wimperis	(Austria) / (United Kingdom) (England)	Mrs. Miniver	Won	
1942	George Froeschel, James Hilton, Claudine West, and Arthur Wimperis	(Austria) / (United Kingdom) (England)	Random Harvest	Nominated	
1942	Jo Swerling	(Ukraine)	The Pride of the Yankees	Nominated	
1942	Rodney Ackland and Emeric Pressburger	(United Kingdom) (England) / (Hungary) (United Kingdom)	49th Parallel	Nominated	
1944	Samuel Hoffenstein	(Russia)	Laura	Nominated	
1944	John Van Druten	(United Kingdom) (England)	Gaslight	Nominated	
1944	Walter Reisch	(Austria)	Gaslight	Nominated	
1944	Raymond Chandler	(United States) (United Kingdom)	Double Indemnity	Nominated	
1944	Billy Wilder	(Austria)	Double Indemnity	Nominated	
1945	Billy Wilder	(Austria)	The Lost Weekend	Won	
1946	Sergio Amidel and Federico Fellini	(Italy)	Rome, Open City	Nominated	
1946	David Lean, Anthony Havelock-Allan, and Ronald Neame	(United Kingdom) (England)	Brief Encounter	Nominated	
1947	David Lean, Anthony Havelock-Allan, and Ronald Neame	(United Kingdom) (England)	Great Expectations	Nominated	
1948	Billy Wilder	(Austria)	A Foreign Affair	Nominated	
1948	Irma Von Cube	(Germany)	Johnny Belinda	Nominated	
1948	Richard Schweizer and David Wechsler	(Switzerland)	The Search	Nominated	
1948	Frank Partos	(Hungary) (England)	The Snake Pit	Nominated	
1949	Cesare Zavattini	(Italy)	Bicycle Thieves	Nominated	
1949	Graham Greene	(United Kingdom) (England)	The Fallen Idol	Nominated	
1951	Jacques Natanson and Max Ophüls	(France) / (Germany)	La Ronde	Nominated	
1951	Robert Wyler	(Switzerland)	Detective Story	Nominated	
1952	John Dighton and Roger MacDougall	(United Kingdom) (England) / (United Kingdom) (Scotland)	Sabrina	Nominated	
1953	John Dighton and Ian McLellan Hunter	(United Kingdom) (England)	Roman Holiday	Nominated	
1953	Eric Ambler	(United Kingdom) (England)	The Cruel Sea	Nominated	
1954	Billy Wilder	(Austria)	Sabrina	Nominated	
1956	Ivan Moffat	(United Kingdom) (Cuba)	Giant	Nominated	
1957	Pierre Boulle	(France)	The Bridge on the River Kwai	Won	
1958	Alec Guinness	(United Kingdom) (England)	The Horse's Mouth	Nominated	
1959	I. A. L. Diamond and Billy Wilder	(Romania) (United States) / (Austria)	Some Like It Hot	Nominated	
1959	Neil Paterson	(United Kingdom) (Scotland)	Room at the Top	Won	
1960	T. E. B. Clarke and Gavin Lambert	(United Kingdom) (England)	Sons and Lovers	Nominated	
1960	James Kennaway	(United Kingdom) (Scotland)	Tunes of Glory	Nominated	
1962	Vladimir Nabokov	(Russia)	Lolita	Nominated	
1962	Robert Bolt	(United Kingdom) (England)	Lawrence of Arabia	Nominated	
1963	John Osborne	(United Kingdom) (England)	Tom Jones	Won	
1963	Serge Bourguignon and Antoine Tudal	(France)	Sundays and Cybele	Nominated	
1964	Peter George	(United Kingdom) (Wales)	Dr. Strangelove	Nominated	
1964	Michael Cacoyannis	(Cyprus) (Greece)	Zorba the Greek	Nominated	
1965	Robert Bolt	(United Kingdom) (England)	Doctor Zhivago	Won	
1966	Robert Bolt	(United Kingdom) (England)	A Man for All Seasons	Won	
1966	Vernon Harris	(United Kingdom) (England)	Alfie	Nominated	
1968	Roman Polanski	(France) (Poland)	Rosemary's Baby	Nominated	
1968	Vernon Harris	(United Kingdom) (England)	Oliver!	Nominated	
1969	Bridget Boland	(Republic of Ireland) (United Kingdom)	Anne of the Thousand Days	Nominated	
1969	Costa-Gavras and Jorge Semprún	(Greece) (France) / (Spain)	Z	Nominated	
1970	Joseph Bologna	(Italy)	Lovers and Other Strangers	Nominated	
1971	Bernardo Bertolucci	(Italy)	The Conformist	Nominated	
1971	Vittorio Bonicelli and Ugo Pirro	(Italy)	The Garden of the Finzi-Continis	Nominated	
1972	Bengt Forslund and Jan Troell	(Sweden)	The Emigrants	Nominated	
1974	Paul Dehn	(United Kingdom) (England)	Murder on the Orient Express	Nominated	
1974	Lionel Chetwynd	(United Kingdom) (England)	The Apprenticeship of Duddy Kravitz	Nominated	
1975	Ruggero Maccari and Dino Risi	(Italy)	Profumo di donna	Nominated	
1976	Federico Fellini and Bernardino Zapponi	(Italy)	Fellini's Casanova	Nominated	
1976	David Butler	(United Kingdom) (Scotland)	Voyage of the Damned	Nominated	
1977	Gavin Lambert	| (United Kingdom) (Scotland)	I Never Promised You a Rose Garden	Nominated	
1977	Peter Shaffer	| (United Kingdom) (Scotland)	Equus	Nominated	
1977	Luis Buñuel and Jean-Claude Carrière	(Spain) / (France)	That Obscure Object of Desire	Nominated	
1979	Marcello Danon, Édouard Molinaro, Jean Poiret, and Francis Veber	(France)	La Cage aux Folles	Nominated	
1981	Harold Pinter	(United Kingdom) (England)	The French Lieutenant's Woman	Nominated	
1981	Dennis Potter	(United Kingdom) (England)	Pennies from Heaven	Nominated	
1982	Costa-Gavras	(Greece) (France)	Missing	Won	
1982	Wolfgang Petersen	(Germany)	Das Boot	Nominated	
1983	Harold Pinter	(United Kingdom) (England)	Betrayal	Nominated	
1983	Willy Russell	(United Kingdom) (England)	Educating Rita	Nominated	
1983	Ronald Harwood	(South Africa) (United Kingdom)	The Dresser	Nominated	Harwood was born in South Africa.
1985	Menno Meyjes	(Netherlands) (United States)	The Color Purple	Nominated	
1986	Ruth Prawer Jhabvala	(Germany) (United Kingdom)	A Room with a View	Won	
1987	Bernardo Bertolucci and Mark Peploe	(Italy) / (United Kingdom) (England)	The Last Emperor	Won	
1987	Per Berglund, Brasse Brännström, Lasse Hallström and Reidar Jönsson	(Sweden)	My Life as a Dog	Nominated	
1987	James Dearden	(United Kingdom) (England)	Fatal Attraction	Nominated	
1988	Christopher Hampton	(United Kingdom) (England)	Dangerous Liaisons	Won	
1988	Christine Edzard	(France)	Little Dorrit	Nominated	
1988	Jean-Claude Carrière	(France)	The Unbearable Lightness of Being	Nominated	
1989	Shane Connaughton and Jim Sheridan	(Republic of Ireland)	My Left Foot	Nominated	
1990	Martin Scorsese	(Italy) (United States)	Goodfellas	Nominated	
1991	Agniezska Holland	(Poland)	Europa Europa	Nominated	
1992	Peter Barnes	(United Kingdom) (England)	Enchanted April	Nominated	
1992	Ruth Prawer Jhabvala	(Germany) (United Kingdom)	Howards End	Won	
1993	Ruth Prawer Jhabvala	(Germany) (United Kingdom)	The Remains of the Day	Nominated	
1993	Martin Scorsese	(Italy) (United States)	Age of Innocence	Nominated	
1993	Terry George and Jim Sheridan	(Republic of Ireland)	In the Name of the Father	Nominated	
1994	Alan Bennett	(United Kingdom) (England)	The Madness of King George	Nominated	
1995	Emma Thompson	(United Kingdom) (England)	Sense and Sensibility	Won	
1995	Mike Figgis	(United Kingdom) (England)	Leaving Las Vegas	Nominated	
1995	Michael Radford, Anna Pavignano, Furio Scarpelli, Giacomo Scarpelli, and Massimo Troisi	(United Kingdom) (England) / (Italy)	Il Postino: The Postman	Nominated	
1996	Kenneth Branagh	(Republic of Ireland) (United Kingdom)	Hamlet	Nominated	
1996	John Hodge	(United Kingdom) (Scotland)	Trainspotting	Nominated	
1996	Anthony Minghella	(United Kingdom) (England)	The English Patient	Nominated	
1997	Atom Egoyan	(Armenia) (Canada)	The Sweet Hereafter	Won	
1999	Anthony Minghella	(United Kingdom) (England)	The Talented Mr. Ripley	Nominated	
2002	David Hare	(United Kingdom) (England)	The Hours	Nominated	
2002	Ronald Harwood	(South Africa) (United Kingdom)	The Pianist	Won	
2004	Julie Delpy	(France)	Before Sunset	Nominated	
2005	Jeffrey Caine	(United Kingdom) (England)	Philomena	Nominated	
2006	Sacha Baron Cohen, Peter Baynham, and Dan Mazer	(United Kingdom) (England) / (United Kingdom) (Scotland)	Borat	Nominated	
2006	Hawk Ostby	(Norway)	Children of Men	Nominated	
2006	Patrick Marber	(United Kingdom) (England)	Notes on a Scandal	Nominated	
2007	Christopher Hampton	(United Kingdom) (England)	Atonement	Nominated	
2007	Ronald Harwood	(South Africa) (United Kingdom)	The Diving Bell and the Butterfly	Nominated	
2008	Simon Beaufoy	(United Kingdom) (England)	Slumdog Millionaire	Won	
2008	Peter Morgan	(United Kingdom) (England)	Frost/Nixon	Nominated	
2008	David Hare	(United Kingdom) (England)	The Reader	Nominated	
2009	Nick Hornby	(United Kingdom) (England)	An Education	Nominated	
2009	Jesse Armstrong, Simon Blackwell, Armando Iannucci and Tony Roche	(United Kingdom) (England) / (United Kingdom) (Scotland)	In the Loop	Nominated	
2010	Simon Beaufoy and Danny Boyle	(United Kingdom) (England)	127 Hours	Nominated	
2011	Bridget O'Connor and Peter Straughan	(United Kingdom) (England)	Tinker Tailor Soldier Spy	Nominated	
2011	George Clooney	(France) (United States)	The Ides of March	Nominated	He acquired the French citizenship in 2025.
2013	Steve Coogan and Jeff Pope	(United Kingdom) (England)	Philomena	Nominated	
2013	Julie Delpy	(France)	Before Midnight	Nominated	
2014	Damien Chazelle	(France) (United States)	Whiplash	Nominated	
2015	Emma Donoghue	(Republic of Ireland) (Canada)	Room	Nominated	
2015	Nick Hornby	(United Kingdom) (England)	Brooklyn	Nominated	
2020/2021	Christopher Hampton and Florian Zeller	(United Kingdom) (England) / (France)	The Father	Won	
2020/2021	Sacha Baron Cohen, Dan Swimer, Peter Baynham and Dan Mazer	(United Kingdom) (England) / (United Kingdom) (Scotland)	Borat Subsequent Moviefilm	Nominated	
2022	Edward Berger, Lesley Paterson and Ian Stokell	(Germany) / (United Kingdom) (England)	All Quiet on the Western Front	Nominated	
2022	Kazuo Ishiguro	(Japan) (United Kingdom)	Living	Nominated	
2023	Christopher Nolan	(United Kingdom) (England)	Oppenheimer	Nominated	
2023	Jonathan Glazer	(United Kingdom) (England)	The Zone of Interest	Nominated	
2024	Jacques Audiard; Thomas Bidegain; Léa Mysius; Nicolas Livecchi	(France)	Emilia Pérez	Nominated	
2024	Peter Straughan	(United Kingdom) (England)	Conclave	Won	
2025	Maggie O'Farrell	(United Kingdom) (Northern Ireland) (Scotland)	Hamnet	Nominated	Born in Northern Ireland; Resides in Scotland; Shared with Cholé Zhao

== Best Story ==
Best Story
Year	Name	Country	Film	Status	Milestone / Notes
1928	Lajos Bíró	(Hungary)	The Last Command	Nominated	
1928	Ben Hecht	(Belarus)	Underworld	Won	
1929	Harry d'Abbadie d'Arrast	(France)	Laughter	Nominated	
1929	Kubec Glasmon	(Poland)	The Public Enemy	Nominated	
1934	Arthur Caesar	(Romania)	Manhattan Melodrama	Nominated	
1935	Ben Hecht	(Belarus)	The Scoundrel	Won	
1937	Heinz Herald and Geza Herczeg	(Germany) / (Hungary)	The Life of Emile Zola	Nominated	
1937	Hans Kraly	(Germany)	One Hundred Men and a Girl	Nominated	
1938	Frederick Kohner	(Austria)	Mad About Music	Nominated	
1939	Felix Jackson	(Germany)	Bachelor Mother	Nominated	
1939	Melchior Lengyel	(Hungary)	Ninotchka	Nominated	
1940	Bella and Samuel Spewack	(Romania) / (Ukraine)	My Favorite Wife	Nominated	
1940	Walter Reisch	(Austria)	Comrade X	Nominated	
1941	Billy Wilder	(Austria)	Ball of Fire	Nominated	
1941	Monckton Hoffe	(Republic of Ireland)	The Lady Eve	Nominated	
1942	Emeric Pressburger	(Hungary) / (United Kingdom)	49th Parallel	Won	
1944	Alfred Neumann	(Germany)	None Shall Escape	Nominated	
1945	Charles G. Booth	(United Kingdom)	The House on 92nd Street	Won	
1945	László Görög	(Hungary)	The Affairs of Susan	Nominated	Shared with Thomas Monroe
1945	Ernst Marischka	(Austria)	A Song to Remember	Nominated	
1946	Clemence Dane	(United Kingdom)	Vacation from Marriage	Won	
1946	Vladimir Pozner	(France)	The Dark Mirror	Nominated	
1946	Victor Trivas	(Russian Empire)	The Stranger	Nominated	
1947	Georges Chaperot; René Wheeler	(France)	A Cage of Nightingales	Nominated	
1947	Frederick Stephani	(Germany)	It Happened on Fifth Avenue	Nominated	Shared with Herbert Clyde Lewis
1948	Richard Schweizer; David Wechsler	(Switzerland)	The Search	Won	
1948	Emeric Pressburger	(Hungary) / (United Kingdom)	The Red Shoes	Nominated	
1950	Giuseppe De Santis; Carlo Lizzani	(Italy)	Bitter Rice	Nominated	
1950	André de Toth	(Hungary)	The Gunfighter	Nominated	Shared with William Bowers
1951	James Bernard; Paul Dehn	(United Kingdom)	Seven Days to Noon	Won	
1951	Oscar Millard	(United Kingdom)	The Frogmen	Nominated	
1951	Alfred Hayes	(United Kingdom)	Teresa	Nominated	Shared with Stewart Stern
1952	Robert Riskin	(Russia)	Here Comes The Groom	Nominated	
1954	Ettore Margadonna	(Italy)	Bread, Love and Dreams	Nominated	
1954	François Boyer	(France)	Forbidden Games	Nominated	
1954	Jed Harris	(Austria)	Night People	Nominated	
1954	Philip Yordan	(Poland)	Broken Lance	Won	
1955	Jean Marsan; Henri Troyat; Jacques Perret; Henri Verneuil; Raoul Ploquin	(France) (Russian Empire) (France) (Armenia) (France)	The Sheep Has Five Legs	Nominated	
1956	Jean-Paul Sartre	(France)	The Proud and the Beautiful	Nominated	
1956	Cesare Zavattini	(Italy)	Umberto D.	Nominated	

== Best Animated Feature ==
Academy Award for Best Animated Feature
Year	Name	Country	Film	Status	Milestone / Notes
2003	Sylvain Chomet	(France)	The Triplets of Belleville	Nominated	
2005	Nick Park; Steve Box	(United Kingdom)	Wallace & Gromit: The Curse of the Were-Rabbit	Won	
2006	Gil Kenan	(United Kingdom)	Monster House	Nominated	
2007	Vincent Paronnaud	(France)	Persepolis	Nominated	Shared with Marjane Satrapi.
2008	John Stevenson	(United Kingdom)	Kung Fu Panda	Nominated	Shared with Mark Osborne.
2009	Tomm Moore	(Republic of Ireland)	The Secret of Kells	Nominated	
2010	Sylvain Chomet	(France)	The Illusionist	Nominated	
2011	Alain Gagnol; Jean-Loup Felicioli	(France)	A Cat in Paris	Nominated	
2011	Fernando Trueba; Javier Mariscal	(Spain)	Chico and Rita	Nominated	
2012	Sam Fell; Chris Butler	(United Kingdom)	ParaNorman	Nominated	
2012	Peter Lord	(United Kingdom)	The Pirates! Band of Misfits	Nominated	
2013	Pierre Coffin	(France)	Despicable Me 2	Nominated	Shared with Chris Renaud and Chris Meledandri.
2013	Benjamin Renner; Didier Brunner	(France)	Ernest & Celestine	Nominated	
2014	Tomm Moore; Paul Young	(Republic of Ireland)	Song of the Sea	Nominated	
2015	Mark Burton; Richard Starzak	(United Kingdom)	Shaun the Sheep Movie	Nominated	
2016	Claude Barras; Max Karli	(Switzerland)	My Life as a Zucchini	Nominated	
2016	Michaël Dudok de Wit	(Netherlands)	The Red Turtle	Nominated	Shared with Toshio Suzuki.
2017	Nora Twomey	(Republic of Ireland)	The Breadwinner	Nominated	Shared with Anthony Leo.
2017	Dorota Kobiela	(Poland)	Loving Vincent	Nominated	
2017	Hugh Welchman; Ivan Mactaggart	(United Kingdom)	Loving Vincent	Nominated	
2019	Jérémy Clapin; Marc du Pontavice	(France)	I Lost My Body	Nominated	
2019	Sergio Pablos; Marisa Román	(Spain)	Klaus	Nominated	Shared with Jinko Gotoh.
2019	Chris Butler	(United Kingdom)	Missing Link	Nominated	Shared with Arianne Sutner and Travis Knight.
2020	Richard Phelan; Will Becher; Paul Kewley	(United Kingdom)	A Shaun the Sheep Movie: Farmageddon	Nominated	
2020	Tomm Moore; Ross Stewart; Paul Young	(Republic of Ireland)	Wolfwalkers	Nominated	
2020	Stéphan Roelants	(Belgium)	Wolfwalkers	Nominated	
2021	Jonas Poher Rasmussen; Monica Hellström; Signe Byrge Sørensen	(Denmark)	Flee	Nominated	
2021	Charlotte De La Gournerie	(France)	Flee	Nominated	
2021	Enrico Casarosa	(Italy)	Luca	Nominated	Shared with Andrea Warren.
2022	Pablo Berger; Ibon Cormenzana; Ignasi Estapé; Sandra Tapia Díaz	(Spain)	Robot Dreams	Nominated	
2024	Gints Zilbalodis; Matīss Kaža; Ron Dyens; Gregory Zalcman	(Latvia) (France) (Belgium)	Flow	Won	
2024	Nick Park; Merlin Crossingham; Richard Beek	(United Kingdom) (England)	Wallace & Gromit: Vengeance Most Fowl	Nominated	
2025	Ugo Bienvenu; Félix de Givry; Sophie Mas	(France)	Arco	Nominated	Shared with Natalie Portman
2025	Maïlys Vallade; Liane-Cho Han; Henri Magalon	(France)	Little Amélie or the Character of Rain	Nominated	Shared with Nidia Santiago

== Best Animated Short Film ==
Academy Award for Best Animated Short Film
Year	Name	Country	Film	Status	Milestone / Notes
1936	Max Fleischer	(Poland)	Popeye the Sailor Meets Sindbad the Sailor	Nominated	Fleischer was Polish-born American.
1937	Max Fleischer	(Poland)	Educated Fish	Nominated	
1938	Max Fleischer	(Poland)	Hunky and Spunky	Nominated	
1941	Max Fleischer	(Poland)	Superman	Nominated	
1941	George Pal	(Hungary)	Rhythm in the Ranks	Nominated	
1942	George Pal	(Hungary)	Tulips Shall Grow	Nominated	
1943	George Pal	(Hungary)	The 500 Hats of Bartholomew Cubbins	Nominated	
1944	George Pal	(Hungary)	And to Think That I Saw It on Mulberry Street	Nominated	
1945	George Pal	(Hungary)	Jasper and the Beanstalk	Nominated	
1946	George Pal	(Hungary)	John Henry and the Inky-Poo	Nominated	
1947	George Pal	(Hungary)	Tubby the Tuba	Nominated	
1960	František Vystrčil	(Czech Republic)	A Place in the Sun	Nominated	
1961	Zagreb Film	(Socialist Federal Republic of Yugoslavia) / (Croatia)	Ersatz	Won	Directed by Yugoslavian/Croatian Dušan Vukotić. First non-US production to win for Best Animated Short.
1963	John Halas	(United Kingdom)	Automania 2000	Nominated	
1963	Dušan Vukotić	(Socialist Federal Republic of Yugoslavia) / (Croatia)	The Game (Igra)	Nominated	
1965	Emanuele Luzzati	(Italy)	The Thieving Magpie	Nominated	
1966	Wolf Koenig	(Germany)	The Drag	Nominated	Koenig was German-Canadian. Shared with Robert Verrall.
1967	Wolf Koenig	(Germany)	What on Earth!	Nominated	Koenig was German-Canadian. Shared with Robert Verrall.
1967	Jean-Charles Meunier	(France)	Hypothese Beta	Nominated	
1968	Wolf Koenig	(Germany)	The House That Jack Built	Nominated	Shared with Jim MacKay
1971	Michael Mills	(United Kingdom)	Evolution	Nominated	Mills is a British-born Canadian.
1971	Gerald Potterton; Peter Sander	(United Kingdom)	The Selfish Giant	Nominated	Potterton and Sander are both British-born Canadians.
1972	Richard Williams	(United Kingdom)	A Christmas Carol	Won	Williams was British-Canadian.
1972	Bob Godfrey	(United Kingdom)	Kama Sutra Rides Again	Nominated	
1972	Nedeljko Dragić	(Socialist Federal Republic of Yugoslavia) / (Croatia)	Tup Tup	Nominated	
1973	Guilo Gianini; Emanuele Luzzati	(Italy)	Pulcinella	Nominated	
1974	Peter Foldes	(Hungary) / (United Kingdom)	Hunger	Nominated	Shared with René Jodoin
1974	Wolfgang Reitherman	(Germany)	Winnie the Pooh and Tigger Too	Nominated	
1975	Bob Godfrey	(United Kingdom)	Great	Won	
1975	Marcell Jankovics	(Hungary)	Sisyphus	Nominated	
1976	Manfredo Manfredi	(Italy)	Dedalo	Nominated	
1976	Guy Glover	(United Kingdom)	The Street	Nominated	Shared with Caroline Leaf.
1977	Co Hoedeman	(Netherlands)	The Sand Castle	Won	Hoedeman is Dutch-Canadian.
1978	Eunice Macaulay	(United Kingdom)	Special Delivery	Won	Shared with John Weldon.
1978	Nico Crama	(Netherlands)	Oh My Darling	Nominated	
1979	Derek Lamb	(United Kingdom)	Every Child	Won	
1979	Bob Godfrey	(United Kingdom)	Dream Doll	Nominated	
1979	Zlatko Grgić	(Socialist Federal Republic of Yugoslavia) / (Croatia)	Dream Doll	Nominated	
1979	Paul Fierlinger	(Czech Republic)	It's So Nice to Have a Wolf Around the House	Nominated	
1980	Ferenc Rofusz	(Hungary)	The Fly	Won	
1980	Michael Mills	(United Kingdom)	History of the World in Three Minutes Flat	Nominated	Mills is a British-born Canadian.
1982	Zbigniew Rybczyński	(Poland)	Tango	Won	
1982	John Coates; Dianne Jackson	(United Kingdom)	The Snowman	Nominated	
1985	Cilia van Dijk	(Netherlands)	Anna & Bella	Won	
1985	Alison Snowden	(United Kingdom)	Second Class Mail	Nominated	
1986	Willem Thijsen	(Netherlands)	A Greek Tragedy	Won	
1986	Linda Van Tulden	(Belgium)	A Greek Tragedy	Won	
1987	Eunice Macaulay	(United Kingdom)	George and Rosemary	Nominated	
1989	Wolfgang Lauenstein; Christoph Lauenstein	(Germany)	Balance	Won	
1989	Aleksandr Petrov	(Russia)	The Cow	Nominated	
1989	Mark Baker	(United Kingdom)	The Hill Farm	Nominated	
1990	Nick Park	(United Kingdom)	Creature Comforts	Won	
1990	Nick Park	(United Kingdom)	A Grand Day Out	Nominated	
1990	Bruno Bozzetto	(Italy)	Grasshoppers	Nominated	
1991	Daniel Greaves	(United Kingdom)	Manipulation	Won	
1992	Peter Lord	(United Kingdom)	Adam	Nominated	
1992	Paul Berry	(United Kingdom)	The Sandman	Nominated	
1992	Barry Purves	(United Kingdom)	Screen Play	Nominated	
1992	Michaela Pavlátová	(Czech Republic)	Reci, Reci, Reci...	Nominated	
1993	Nick Park	(United Kingdom)	The Wrong Trousers	Won	
1993	Stephen Palmer	(United Kingdom)	Blindscape	Nominated	
1993	Kevin Baldwin; Bob Godfrey	(United Kingdom)	Small Talk	Nominated	
1993	Mark Baker	(United Kingdom)	The Village	Nominated	
1994	Alison Snowden	(United Kingdom)	Bob's Birthday	Won	Shared with David Fine
1994	David Stoten; Tim Watts	(United Kingdom)	The Big Story	Nominated	
1994	Michaël Dudok de Wit	(Netherlands)	The Monk and the Fish	Nominated	
1995	Nick Park	(United Kingdom)	A Close Shave	Won	
1995	Alexiy Kharitidi	(Russia)	Gagarin	Nominated	
1996	Tyron Montgomery	(Republic of Ireland)	Quest	Won	
1996	Thomas Stellmach	(Germany)	Quest	Won	
1996	Peter Lord	(United Kingdom)	Wat's Pig	Nominated	
1997	Jan Pinkava	(Czech Republic)	Geri's Game	Won	Pinkava is Czech-born and holds British and American citizenship
1997	Joanna Quinn	(United Kingdom)	Famous Fred	Nominated	
1997	Aleksandr Petrov	(Russia)	The Mermaid	Nominated	
1997	Sylvain Chomet	(France)	The Old Lady and the Pigeons	Nominated	
1998	Christopher Grace; Jonathan Myerson	(United Kingdom)	The Canterbury Tales	Nominated	
1998	Mark Baker	(United Kingdom)	Jolly Roger	Nominated	
1998	Stefan Fjeldmark; Karsten Kiilerich	(Denmark)	When Life Departs	Nominated	
1999	Aleksandr Petrov	(Russia)	The Old Man and the Sea	Won	
1999	Paul Driessen	(Netherlands)	3 Misses	Nominated	
1999	Peter Peake	(United Kingdom)	Humdrum	Nominated	
1999	Torill Kove	(Norway)	My Grandmother Ironed the King's Shirts	Nominated	Kove is a Norwegian-born Canadian.
2000	Michaël Dudok de Wit	(Netherlands)	Father and Daughter	Won	
2000	Steffen Schäffler; Annette Schäffler	(Germany)	The Periwig-Maker	Nominated	
2001	Seamus Byrne; Ruairí Robinson	(Republic of Ireland)	Fifty Percent Grey	Nominated	
2001	Cathal Gaffney; Darragh O'Connell	(Republic of Ireland)	Give Up Yer Aul Sins	Nominated	
2002	Tomek Baginski	(Poland)	The Cathedral	Nominated	
2002	Chris Stenner; Heidi Wittlinger	(Germany)	Das Rad	Nominated	
2003	Dominique Monféry	(France)	Destino	Nominated	Shared with Roy E. Disney.
2005	Sharon Colman	(United Kingdom)	Badgered	Nominated	
2006	Torill Kove	(Norway)	The Danish Poet	Won	
2006	Géza M. Tóth	(Hungary)	Maestro	Nominated	
2007	Suzie Templeton; Hugh Welchman	(United Kingdom)	Peter & the Wolf	Won	
2007	Samuel Tourneux; Simon Vanesse	(France)	Even Pigeons Go to Heaven	Nominated	
2007	Maciek Szczerbowski	(Poland)	Madame Tutli-Putli	Nominated	Shared with Chris Lavis.
2007	Aleksandr Petrov	(Russia)	My Love	Nominated	
2008	Konstantin Bronzit	(Russia)	Lavatory – Lovestory	Nominated	
2008	Thierry Marchand	(France)	Oktapodi	Nominated	Shared with Emud Mokhberi.
2008	Adam Foulkes; Alan Smith	(United Kingdom)	This Way Up	Nominated	
2009	Nicolas Schmerkin	(France)	Logorama	Won	
2009	Fabrice Joubert	(France)	French Roast	Nominated	
2009	Darragh O'Connell; Nicky Phelan	(Republic of Ireland)	Granny O'Grimm's Sleeping Beauty	Nominated	
2009	Javier Recio Gracia	(Spain)	The Lady and the Reaper	Nominated	
2009	Nick Park	(United Kingdom)	A Matter of Loaf and Death	Nominated	
2010	Andrew Ruhemann	(United Kingdom)	The Lost Thing	Won	Shared with Shaun Tan.
2010	Max Lang; Jakob Schuh	(Germany)	The Gruffalo	Nominated	
2010	Bastien Dubois	(France)	Madagascar, a Journey Diary	Nominated	
2011	Enrico Casarosa	(Italy)	La Luna	Nominated	
2011	Sue Goffe; Grant Orchard	(United Kingdom)	A Morning Stroll	Nominated	
2012	Fodhla Cronin O'Reilly	(Republic of Ireland)	Head Over Heels	Nominated	Shared with Timothy Reckart.
2013	Alexandre Espigares	(Spain) / (Luxembourg)	Mr Hublot	Won	
2013	Laurent Witz	(Luxembourg)	Mr Hublot	Won	
2013	Daniel Sousa	(Portugal)	Feral	Nominated	Shared with Dan Golden.
2013	Max Lang; Jan Lachauer	(Germany)	Room on the Broom	Nominated	
2013	Torill Kove	(Norway)	Me and My Moulton	Nominated	
2013	Joris Oprins	(Netherlands)	A Single Life	Nominated	
2013	Christopher Hees; Daisy Jacobs	(United Kingdom)	The Bigger Picture	Nominated	
2015	Imogen Sutton; Richard Williams	(United Kingdom)	Prologue	Nominated	Both are Canadian-British.
2015	Sanjay Patel	(United Kingdom)	Sanjay's Super Team	Nominated	Patel is a British-born Indian-American. Shared with Nicole Paradis Grindle.
2015	Konstantin Bronzit	(Russia)	We Can't Live Without Cosmos	Nominated	
2016	Theodore Ushev	(Bulgaria)	Blind Vaysha	Nominated	
2016	Cara Speller	(United Kingdom)	Pear Cider and Cigarettes	Nominated	Shared with Robert Valley.
2017	Victor Caire; Gabriel Grapperon	(France)	Garden Party	Nominated	
2017	Jakob Schuh; Jan Lachauer	(Germany)	Revolting Rhymes	Nominated	
2018	Alison Snowden	(United Kingdom)	Animal Vehaviour	Nominated	Shared with David Fine
2018	Louise Bagnall	(Republic of Ireland)	Late Afternoon	Nominated	
2018	Nuria González Blanco	(Spain)	Late Afternoon	Nominated	
2019	Daria Kashcheeva	(Czech Republic)	Daughter	Nominated	
2019	Bruno Collet; Jean-François Le Corre	(France)	Mémorable	Nominated	
2020	Adrien Mérigeau; Amaury Ovise	(France)	Genius Loci	Nominated	
2020	Arnar Gunnarsson; Gísli Darri Halldórsson	(Iceland)	Yes-People	Nominated	
2021	Alberto Mielgo; Leo Sanchez	(Spain)	The Windshield Wiper	Won	
2021	Anton Dyakov	(Russia)	Boxballet	Nominated	Dyakov is a Kazakh-Russian.
2021	Joanna Quinn; Les Mills	(United Kingdom)	Affairs of the Art	Nominated	
2021	Dan Ojari; Mikey Please	(United Kingdom)	Robin Robin	Nominated	
2022	Charlie Mackesy; Matthew Freud	(United Kingdom)	The Boy, the Mole, the Fox and the Horse	Won	
2022	João Gonzalez; Bruno Caetano	(Portugal)	Ice Merchants	Nominated	
2022	Sara Gunnarsdóttir	(Iceland)	My Year of Dicks	Nominated	
2022	Stéphanie Clément; Marc Rius	(France)	Pachyderme	Nominated	
2024	Nicolas Keppens; Brecht Van Elslande	(Belgium)	Beautiful Men	Nominated	
2024	Nina Gantz; Stienette Bosklopper	(Netherlands)	Wander to Wonder	Nominated	
2024	Loïc Espuche; Juliette Marquet	(France)	Yuck!	Nominated	
2025	Florence Miailhe; Ron Dyens	(France)	Butterfly	Nominated	
2025	Maciek Szczerbowski	(Poland) (Canada)	The Girl Who Cried Pearls	Won	Shared with Chris Lavis
2025	John Kelly Andrew Freedman	(Republic of Ireland)	Retirement Plan	Nominated	
2025	Konstantin Bronzit	(Russia)	The Three Sisters	Nominated	

== Best Cinematography ==
Best Cinematography
Year	Name	Country	Film	Status	Milestone / Notes
1945	Tony Gaudio	(Italy)	A Song to Remember	Nominated	Color; Shared with Allen M. Davey
1946	Charles Rosher	(United Kingdom)	The Yearling	Won	Color; Shared with Leonard Smith and Arthur Arling
1947	Guy Green	(United Kingdom)	Great Expectations	Won	Black-and-White
1947	Jack Cardiff	(United Kingdom)	Black Narcissus	Won	Color
1948	Nicholas Musuraca	(Italy)	I Remember Mama	Nominated	Black-and-White
1948	Joseph Valentine	(Italy)	Joan of Arc	Won	Color; Shared with William V. Skall and Winton C. Hoch
1949	Franz Planer	(Czech Republic)	Champion	Nominated	Black-and-White
1950	Charles Rosher	(United Kingdom)	Annie Get Your Gun	Nominated	Color
1951	Franz Planer	(Czech Republic)	Death of a Salesman	Nominated	Black-and-White
1951	John Alton	(Hungary)	An American in Paris	Won	Color; Shared with Alfred Gilks
1951	Charles Rosher	(United Kingdom)	Show Boat	Nominated	Color
1952	Freddie Young	(United Kingdom)	Ivanhoe	Nominated	Color
1953	Joseph Ruttenberg	(Russian Empire)	Julius Caesar	Nominated	Black-and-White
1953	Joseph C. Brun	(France)	Martin Luther	Nominated	Black-and-White
1953	Franz Planer; Henri Alekan	(Czech Republic) (France)	Roman Holiday	Nominated	Black-and-White
1954	Boris Kaufman	(Russian Empire)	On the Waterfront	Won	Black-and-White
1956	Joseph Ruttenberg	(Russian Empire)	Somebody Up There Likes Me	Won	Black-and-White
1956	Boris Kaufman	(Russian Empire)	Baby Doll	Nominated	Black-and-White
1956	Jack Cardiff	(United Kingdom)	War and Peace	Nominated	Color
1957	Jack Hildyard	(United Kingdom)	The Bridge on the River Kwai	Won	
1958	Joseph Ruttenberg	(Russian Empire)	Gigi	Won	Color
1959	Franz Planer	(Czech Republic)	The Nun's Story	Nominated	Color
1960	Freddie Francis	(United Kingdom)	Sons and Lovers	Won	Black-and-White
1960	Ernest Laszlo	(Hungary)	Inherit the Wind	Nominated	Black-and-White
1960	Joseph Ruttenberg	(Russian Empire)	BUtterfield 8	Nominated	Color
1961	Eugen Schüfftan	(Germany)	The Hustler	Won	Black-and-White
1961	Franz Planer	(Czech Republic)	The Children's Hour	Nominated	Black-and-White
1961	Ernest Laszlo	(Hungary)	Judgment at Nuremberg	Nominated	Black-and-White
1961	Jack Cardiff	(United Kingdom)	Fanny	Nominated	Color
1962	Jean Bourgoin; Walter Wottitz	(France) (Greece)	The Longest Day	Won	Black-and-White
1962	Freddie Young	(United Kingdom)	Lawrence of Arabia	Won	Color
1963	Ernest Laszlo	(Hungary)	It's a Mad, Mad, Mad, Mad World	Nominated	Color
1964	Walter Lassally	(Germany) / (United Kingdom)	Zorba the Greek	Won	Black-and-White
1964	Geoffrey Unsworth	(United Kingdom)	Becket	Nominated	Color
1965	Ernest Laszlo	(Hungary)	Ship of Fools	Won	Black-and-White
1965	Freddie Young	(United Kingdom)	Doctor Zhivago	Won	Color
1966	Kenneth Higgins	(United Kingdom)	Georgy Girl	Nominated	Black-and-White
1966	Marcel Grignon	(France)	Is Paris Burning?	Nominated	Black-and-White
1966	Ted Moore	(United Kingdom)	A Man for All Seasons	Won	Color
1966	Ernest Laszlo	(Hungary)	Fantastic Voyage	Nominated	Color
1968	Pasqualino De Santis	(Italy)	Romeo and Juliet	Won	
1968	Oswald Morris	(United Kingdom)	Oliver!	Nominated	
1968	Ernest Laszlo	(Hungary)	Star!	Nominated	
1969	Arthur Ibbetson	(United Kingdom)	Anne of the Thousand Days	Nominated	
1970	Freddie Young	(United Kingdom)	Ryan's Daughter	Won	
1970	Ernest Laszlo	(Hungary)	Airport	Nominated	
1970	Billy Williams	(United Kingdom)	Women in Love	Nominated	
1971	Oswald Morris	(United Kingdom)	Fiddler on the Roof	Won	
1971	Freddie Young	(United Kingdom)	Nicholas and Alexandra	Nominated	
1972	Geoffrey Unsworth	(United Kingdom)	Cabaret	Won	
1972	Douglas Slocombe	(United Kingdom)	Travels with My Aunt	Nominated	
1973	Sven Nykvist	(Sweden)	Cries and Whispers	Won	
1974	Geoffrey Unsworth	(United Kingdom)	Murder on the Orient Express	Nominated	
1975	John Alcott	(United Kingdom)	Barry Lyndon	Won	
1976	Ernest Laszlo	(Hungary)	Logan's Run	Nominated	
1977	Vilmos Zsigmond	(Hungary)	Close Encounters of the Third Kind	Won	
1977	Douglas Slocombe	(United Kingdom)	Julia	Nominated	
1978	Néstor Almendros	(Spain)	Days of Heaven	Won	
1978	Vilmos Zsigmond	(Hungary)	The Deer Hunter	Nominated	
1978	Oswald Morris	(United Kingdom)	The Wiz	Nominated	
1979	Vittorio Storaro	(Italy)	Apocalypse Now	Won	
1979	Giuseppe Rotunno	(Italy)	All That Jazz	Nominated	
1979	Néstor Almendros	(Spain)	Kramer vs. Kramer	Nominated	
1980	Geoffrey Unsworth; Ghislain Cloquet	(United Kingdom) (Belgium) / (France)	Tess	Won	
1980	Néstor Almendros	(Spain)	The Blue Lagoon	Nominated	
1980	Ralf D. Bode	(Germany)	Coal Miner's Daughter	Nominated	
1981	Vittorio Storaro	(Italy)	Reds	Won	
1981	Alex Thomson	(United Kingdom)	Excalibur	Nominated	
1981	Billy Williams	(United Kingdom)	On Golden Pond	Nominated	
1981	Miroslav Ondříček	(Czech Republic)	Ragtime	Nominated	
1981	Douglas Slocombe	(United Kingdom)	Raiders of the Lost Ark	Nominated	
1982	Billy Williams; Ronnie Taylor	(United Kingdom)	Gandhi	Won	
1982	Jost Vacano	(Germany)	Das Boot	Nominated	
1982	Néstor Almendros	(Spain)	Sophie's Choice	Nominated	
1983	Sven Nykvist	(Sweden)	Fanny and Alexander	Won	
1984	Chris Menges	(United Kingdom)	The Killing Fields	Won	
1984	Miroslav Ondříček	(Czech Republic)	Amadeus	Nominated	
1984	Ernest Day	(United Kingdom)	A Passage to India	Nominated	
1984	Vilmos Zsigmond	(Hungary)	The River	Nominated	
1985	David Watkin	(United Kingdom)	Out of Africa	Won	
1986	Chris Menges	(United Kingdom)	The Mission	Won	
1986	Tony Pierce-Roberts	(United Kingdom)	A Room with a View	Nominated	
1987	Vittorio Storaro	(Italy)	The Last Emperor	Won	
1987	Michael Ballhaus	(Germany)	Broadcast News	Nominated	
1987	Philippe Rousselot	(France)	Hope and Glory	Nominated	
1988	Peter Biziou	(United Kingdom)	Mississippi Burning	Won	
1988	Sven Nykvist	(Sweden)	The Unbearable Lightness of Being	Nominated	
1989	Freddie Francis	(United Kingdom)	Glory	Won	
1989	Mikael Salomon	(Denmark)	The Abyss	Nominated	
1989	Michael Ballhaus	(Germany)	The Fabulous Baker Boys	Nominated	
1990	Vittorio Storaro	(Italy)	Dick Tracy	Nominated	
1990	Philippe Rousselot	(France)	Henry & June	Nominated	
1991	Stephen Goldblatt	(United Kingdom)	The Prince of Tides	Nominated	
1991	Adrian Biddle	(United Kingdom)	Thelma & Louise	Nominated	
1992	Philippe Rousselot	(France)	A River Runs Through It	Won	
1992	Tony Pierce-Roberts	(United Kingdom)	Howards End	Nominated	
1992	Robert Fraisse	(France)	The Lover	Nominated	
1993	Janusz Kamiński	(Poland)	Schindler's List	Won	
1993	Stuart Dryburgh	(United Kingdom)	The Piano	Nominated	
1994	Roger Deakins	(United Kingdom)	The Shawshank Redemption	Nominated	
1994	Piotr Sobociński	(Poland)	Three Colours: Red	Nominated	
1995	Stephen Goldblatt	(United Kingdom)	Batman Forever	Nominated	
1995	Michael Coulter	(United Kingdom)	Sense and Sensibility	Nominated	
1996	Darius Khondji	(France) / (Iran)	Evita	Nominated	
1996	Roger Deakins	(United Kingdom)	Fargo	Nominated	
1996	Chris Menges	(United Kingdom)	Michael Collins	Nominated	
1997	Janusz Kamiński	(Poland)	Amistad	Nominated	
1997	Roger Deakins	(United Kingdom)	Kundun	Nominated	
1997	Dante Spinotti	(Italy)	L.A. Confidential	Nominated	
1997	Eduardo Serra	(Portugal)	The Wings of the Dove	Nominated	
1998	Janusz Kamiński	(Poland)	Saving Private Ryan	Won	
1998	Remi Adefarasin	(United Kingdom)	Elizabeth	Nominated	
1998	Richard Greatrex	(United Kingdom)	Shakespeare in Love	Nominated	
1999	Roger Pratt	(United Kingdom)	The End of the Affair	Nominated	
1999	Dante Spinotti	(Italy)	The Insider	Nominated	
2000	John Mathieson	(United Kingdom)	Gladiator	Nominated	
2000	Lajos Koltai	(Poland)	Malèna	Nominated	
2000	Roger Deakins	(United Kingdom)	O Brother, Where Art Thou?	Nominated	
2001	Bruno Delbonnel	(France)	Amélie	Nominated	
2001	Sławomir Idziak	(Poland)	Black Hawk Down	Nominated	
2001	Roger Deakins	(United Kingdom)	The Man Who Wasn't There	Nominated	
2002	Michael Ballhaus	(Germany)	Gangs of New York	Nominated	
2002	Paweł Edelman	(Poland)	The Pianist	Nominated	
2003	Eduardo Serra	(Portugal)	Girl with a Pearl Earring	Nominated	
2004	John Mathieson	(United Kingdom)	The Phantom of the Opera	Nominated	
2004	Bruno Delbonnel	(France)	A Very Long Engagement	Nominated	
2006	Vilmos Zsigmond	(Hungary)	The Black Dahlia	Nominated	
2006	Dick Pope	(United Kingdom)	The Illusionist	Nominated	
2007	Roger Deakins	(United Kingdom)	The Assassination of Jesse James by the Coward Robert Ford	Nominated	
2007	Roger Deakins	(United Kingdom)	No Country for Old Men	Nominated	
2007	Seamus McGarvey	(United Kingdom)	Atonement	Nominated	
2007	Janusz Kamiński	(Poland)	The Diving Bell and the Butterfly	Nominated	
2008	Anthony Dod Mantle	(United Kingdom)	Slumdog Millionaire	Won	
2008	Roger Deakins; Chris Menges	(United Kingdom)	The Reader	Nominated	
2009	Mauro Fiore	(Italy)	Avatar	Won	
2009	Bruno Delbonnel	(France)	Harry Potter and the Half-Blood Prince	Nominated	
2009	Barry Ackroyd	(United Kingdom)	The Hurt Locker	Nominated	
2009	Christian Berger	(Austria)	The White Ribbon	Nominated	
2010	Danny Cohen	(United Kingdom)	The King's Speech	Nominated	
2010	Roger Deakins	(United Kingdom)	True Grit	Nominated	
2011	Guillaume Schiffman	(France)	The Artist	Nominated	
2011	Janusz Kamiński	(Poland)	War Horse	Nominated	
2012	Janusz Kamiński	(Poland)	Lincoln	Nominated	
2012	Seamus McGarvey	(United Kingdom) / (Republic of Ireland)	Anna Karenina	Nominated	
2012	Roger Deakins	(United Kingdom)	Skyfall	Nominated	
2013	Roger Deakins	(United Kingdom)	Prisoners	Nominated	
2013	Bruno Delbonnel	(France)	Inside Llewyn Davis	Nominated	
2013	Philippe Le Sourd	(France)	The Grandmaster	Nominated	
2013	Phedon Papamichael	(Greece)	Nebraska	Nominated	
2014	Łukasz Żal and Ryszard Lenczewski	(Poland)	Ida	Nominated	
2014	Dick Pope	(United Kingdom)	Mr. Turner	Nominated	
2014	Roger Deakins	(United Kingdom)	Unbroken	Nominated	
2015	Roger Deakins	(United Kingdom)	Sicario	Nominated	
2016	Linus Sandgren	(Sweden)	La La Land	Won	
2017	Roger Deakins	(United Kingdom)	Blade Runner 2049	Won	
2017	Bruno Delbonnel	(France)	Darkest Hour	Nominated	
2017	Hoyte van Hoytema	(Switzerland) (Netherlands) (Sweden)	Dunkirk	Nominated	Born in Switzerland to Dutch parents. Currently lives in Sweden.
2017	Dan Laustsen	(Denmark)	The Shape of Water	Nominated	
2018	Łukasz Żal	(Poland)	Cold War	Nominated	
2018	Robbie Ryan	(Republic of Ireland)	The Favourite	Nominated	
2019	Roger Deakins	(United Kingdom)	1917	Won	
2020/2021	Sean Bobbitt	(United Kingdom)	Judas and the Black Messiah	Nominated	
2020/2021	Joshua James Richards	(United Kingdom)	Nomadland	Nominated	
2020/2021	Dariusz Wolski	(Poland)	News of the World	Nominated	
2020/2021	Phedon Papamichael	(Greece)	The Trial of the Chicago 7	Nominated	
2021	Dan Laustsen	(Denmark)	Nightmare Alley	Nominated	
2021	Bruno Delbonnel	(France)	The Tragedy of Macbeth	Nominated	
2021	Janusz Kamiński	(Poland)	West Side Story	Nominated	
2022	James Friend	(United Kingdom)	All Quiet on the Western Front	Won	
2022	Roger Deakins	(United Kingdom)	Empire of Light	Nominated	
2022	Darius Khondji	(Iran) (France)	Bardo, False Chronicle of a Handful of Truths	Nominated	
2022	Florian Hoffmeister	(Germany)	Tár	Nominated	
2023	Hoyte van Hoytema	(Switzerland) (Netherlands) (Sweden)	Oppenheimer	Won	
2023	Robbie Ryan	(Republic of Ireland)	Poor Things	Nominated	
2024	Lol Crawley	(United Kingdom) (England)	The Brutalist	Won	
2024	Paul Guilhaume	(France)	Emilia Pérez	Nominated	
2025	Dan Laustsen	(Denmark)	Frankenstein	Nominated	
2025	Darius Khondji	(Iran) (France)	Marty Supreme	Nominated	

== Best Film Editing ==
Best Film Editing
Year	Name	Country	Film	Status	Milestone / Notes
1937	Basil Wrangell	(Italy)	The Good Earth	Nominated	
1938	Tom Held	(Nazi Germany)	The Great Waltz	Nominated	
1938	Tom Held	(Nazi Germany)	Test Pilot	Nominated	
1939	Charles Frend	(United Kingdom)	Goodbye Mr. Chips	Nominated	
1943	Owen Marks	(United Kingdom)	Casablanca	Nominated	
1944	Owen Marks	(United Kingdom)	Janie	Nominated	
1946	Arthur Hilton	(United Kingdom)	The Killers	Nominated	
1947	Fergus McDonell	(United Kingdom)	Odd Man Out	Nominated	
1948	Reginald Mills	(United Kingdom)	The Red Shoes	Nominated	
1950	Oswald Hafenrichter	(Austria) / (United Kingdom)	The Third Man	Nominated	
1951	Adrienne Fazan	(Germany)	An American in Paris	Nominated	
1952	Ralph Kemplen	(United Kingdom)	Moulin Rouge	Nominated	
1957	Peter Taylor	(United Kingdom)	The Bridge on the River Kwai	Won	
1958	Adrienne Fazan	(Germany)	Gigi	Won	
1961	Thomas Stanford	(Germany)	West Side Story	Won	
1961	Alan Osbiston	(United Kingdom)	The Guns of Navarone	Nominated	
1962	Anne V. Coates	(United Kingdom)	Lawrence of Arabia	Won	
1964	Anne V. Coates	(United Kingdom)	Becket	Nominated	
1965	Norman Savage	(United Kingdom)	Doctor Zhivago	Nominated	
1968	Ralph Kemplen	(United Kingdom)	Oliver!	Nominated	
1969	Françoise Bonnot	(France)	Z	Won	
1971	Bill Butler	(United Kingdom)	A Clockwork Orange	Nominated	
1971	Folmar Blangsted	(Denmark)	Summer of '42	Nominated	
1972	Tom Priestley	(United Kingdom)	Deliverance	Nominated	
1972	Peter Zinner	(Austria)	The Godfather	Nominated	Shared with William H. Reynolds.
1973	Ralph Kemplen	(United Kingdom)	The Day of the Jackal	Nominated	
1975	Russell Lloyd	(United Kingdom)	The Man Who Would Be King	Nominated	
1978	Gerry Hambling	(United Kingdom)	Midnight Express	Nominated	
1978	Stuart Baird	(United Kingdom)	Superman	Nominated	
1978	Peter Zinner	(Austria)	The Deer Hunter	Won	
1980	Anne V. Coates	(United Kingdom)	The Elephant Man	Nominated	
1980	Gerry Hambling	(United Kingdom)	Fame	Nominated	
1981	Terry Rawlings	(United Kingdom)	Chariots of Fire	Nominated	
1981	John Bloom	(United Kingdom)	The French Lieutenant's Woman	Nominated	
1982	John Bloom	(United Kingdom)	Gandhi	Won	
1982	Peter Zinner	(Austria)	An Officer and A Gentleman	Nominated	
1982	Hannes Nikel	(Germany)	Das Boot	Nominated	
1983	Tom Rolf	(Sweden)	The Right Stuff	Won	Shared with Glenn Farr, Lisa Fruchtman, Stephen A. Rotter, and Douglas Stewart.
1984	Jim Clark	(United Kingdom)	The Killing Fields	Won	
1984	David Lean	(United Kingdom)	A Passage to India	Nominated	
1985	Thom Noble	(United Kingdom)	Witness	Won	
1985	John Bloom	(United Kingdom)	A Chorus Line	Nominated	
1985	Rudi Fehr	(Germany)	Prizzi's Honor	Nominated	Shared with Kaja Fehr.
1985	Henry Richardson	(United Kingdom)	Runaway Train	Nominated	
1986	Claire Simpson	(United Kingdom)	Platoon	Won	
1986	Ray Lovejoy	(United Kingdom)	Aliens	Nominated	
1986	Jim Clark	(United Kingdom)	The Mission	Nominated	
1987	Gabriella Cristiani	(Italy)	The Last Emperor	Won	
1988	Stuart Baird	(United Kingdom)	Gorillas in the Mist	Nominated	
1988	Gerry Hambling	(United Kingdom)	Mississippi Burning	Nominated	
1989	Noëlle Boisson	(France)	The Bear	Nominated	
1991	Pietro Scalia	(Italy)	JFK	Won	Shared with Joe Hutshing.
1991	Gerry Hambling	(United Kingdom)	The Commitments	Nominated	
1991	Thom Noble	(United Kingdom)	Thelma & Louise	Nominated	
1992	Robert Leighton	(United Kingdom)	A Few Good Men	Nominated	
1993	Anne V. Coates	(United Kingdom)	In the Line of Fire	Nominated	
1993	Gerry Hambling	(United Kingdom)	In the Name of the Father	Nominated	
1996	Gerry Hambling	(United Kingdom)	Evita	Nominated	
1997	Pietro Scalia	(Italy)	Good Will Hunting	Nominated	
1997	Peter Honess	(United Kingdom)	L.A. Confidential	Nominated	
1998	Simona Paggi	(Italy)	Life Is Beautiful	Nominated	
1998	Anne V. Coates	(United Kingdom)	Out of Sight	Nominated	
1998	David Gamble	(United Kingdom)	Shakespeare in Love	Nominated	
1999	Tariq Anwar; Christopher Greenbury	(United Kingdom)	American Beauty	Nominated	Anwar was born in India to an Austrian mother and an Indian father, but later moved to the United Kingdom.
2000	Pietro Scalia	(Italy)	Gladiator	Nominated	
2001	Pietro Scalia	(Italy)	Black Hawk Down	Won	
2002	Martin Walsh	(United Kingdom)	Chicago	Won	
2002	Peter Boyle	(United Kingdom)	The Hours	Nominated	
2002	Hervé de Luze	(France)	The Pianist	Nominated	
2005	Claire Simpson	(United Kingdom)	The Constant Gardener	Nominated	
2006	Clare Douglas	(United Kingdom)	United 93	Nominated	Shared with Richard Pearson and Christopher Rouse.
2007	Juliette Welfling	(France)	The Diving Bell and the Butterfly	Nominated	
2008	Chris Dickens	(United Kingdom)	Slumdog Millionaire	Won	
2010	John Harris	(United Kingdom)	127 Hours	Nominated	
2010	Tariq Anwar	(United Kingdom)	The King's Speech	Nominated	
2011	Anne-Sophie Bion; Michel Hazanavicius	(France)	The Artist	Nominated	
2013	Mark Sanger	(United Kingdom)	Gravity	Won	Shared with Alfonso Cuarón.
2013	Joe Walker	(United Kingdom)	12 Years a Slave	Nominated	
2013	John Mac McMurphy	(France)	Dallas Buyers Club	Nominated	
2014	Barney Pilling	(United Kingdom)	The Grand Budapest Hotel	Nominated	
2016	Joe Walker	(United Kingdom)	Arrival	Nominated	
2016	Jake Roberts	(United Kingdom)	Hell or High Water	Nominated	
2017	Jonathan Amos	(United Kingdom)	Baby Driver	Nominated	Shared with Paul Machliss.
2017	Jon Gregory	(United Kingdom)	Three Billboards Outside Ebbing, Missouri	Nominated	
2018	Barry Alexander Brown	(United Kingdom)	BlacKkKlansman	Nominated	
2018	Yorgos Mavropsaridis	(Greece)	The Favourite	Nominated	
2020/2021	Mikkel E.G. Nielsen	(Denmark)	Sound of Metal	Won	
2020/2021	Yorgos Lamprinos	(Greece)	The Father	Nominated	
2020/2021	Frédéric Thoraval	(France) / (United States)	Promising Young Woman	Nominated	
2021	Joe Walker	(United Kingdom)	Dune	Won	
2022	Mikkel E.G. Nielsen	(Denmark)	The Banshees of Inisherin	Nominated	
2022	Monika Will	(Austria)	Tár	Nominated	
2022	Eddie Hamilton	(United Kingdom) / (United States)	Top Gun: Maverick	Nominated	
2023	Laurent Sénéchal	(France)	Anatomy of a Fall	Nominated	
2023	Yorgos Mavropsaridis	(Greece)	Poor Things	Nominated	
2024	Nick Emerson	(United Kingdom)	Conclave	Nominated	
2024	Dávid Janscó	(Hungary)	The Brutalist	Nominated	
2024	Juliette Welfling	(France)	Emilia Pérez	Nominated	
2025	Olivier Bugge Coutté	(Denmark)	Sentimental Value	Nominated	

== Best Makeup and Hairstyling ==
Academy Award for Best Makeup and Hairstyling
Year	Name	Country	Film	Status	Milestone / Notes
1982	Michèle Burke	(Republic of Ireland)	Quest for Fire	Won	
1982	Sarah Monzani	(United Kingdom)	Quest for Fire	Won	
1982	Tom Smith	(United Kingdom)	Gandhi	Nominated	
1984	Paul Engelen	(United Kingdom)	Greystoke: The Legend of Tarzan, Lord of the Apes	Nominated	Shared with Rick Baker.
1985	Zoltan Elek	(Hungary)	Mask	Won	Shared with Michael Westmore.
1986	Michèle Burke	(Republic of Ireland)	The Clan of the Cave Bear	Nominated	Shared with Michael Westmore.
1986	Peter Robb-King	(United Kingdom)	Legend	Nominated	Shared with Rob Bottin.
1989	Manlio Rocchetti	(Italy)	Driving Miss Daisy	Won	Shared with Lynn Barber and Kevin Haney.
1989	Fabrizio Sforza	(Italy)	The Adventures of Baron Munchausen	Nominated	
1989	Maggie Weston	(United Kingdom)	The Adventures of Baron Munchausen	Nominated	
1990	Jean-Pierre Eychenne	(France)	Cyrano de Bergerac	Nominated	
1990	Michèle Burke	(Republic of Ireland)	Cyrano de Bergerac	Nominated	
1992	Michèle Burke	(Republic of Ireland)	Bram Stoker's Dracula	Won	Shared with Greg Cannom and Matthew W. Mungle.
1994	Daniel Parker; Paul Engelen; Carol Hemming	(United Kingdom)	Mary Shelley's Frankenstein	Nominated	
1995	Peter Frampton; Lois Burwell	(United Kingdom)	Braveheart	Won	Shared with Paul Pattison
1997	Lisa Westcott; Veronica Brebner; Beverley Binda	(United Kingdom)	Mrs Brown	Nominated	
1997	Tina Earnshaw; Simon Thompson	(United Kingdom)	Titanic	Nominated	Shared with Greg Cannom.
1998	Jenny Shircore	(United Kingdom)	Elizabeth	Won	
1998	Lois Burwell; Conor O'Sullivan	(United Kingdom)	Saving Private Ryan	Nominated	Shared with Daniel C. Striepeke.
1998	Lisa Westcott; Veronica Brebner	(United Kingdom)	Shakespeare in Love	Nominated	
1999	Christine Blundell	(United Kingdom)	Topsy-Turvy	Won	Shared with Trefor Proud
1999	Michèle Burke	(Republic of Ireland)	Austin Powers: The Spy Who Shagged Me	Nominated	Shared with Mike Smithson.
2000	Michèle Burke	(Republic of Ireland)	The Cell	Nominated	Shared with Edouard F. Henriques.
2000	Ann Buchanan	(United Kingdom)	Shadow of the Vampire	Nominated	Shared with Amber Sibley.
2001	Peter Owen; Richard Taylor	(United Kingdom)	The Lord of the Rings: The Fellowship of the Ring	Won	Richard Taylor is British-born New Zealander
2001	Maurizio Silvi; Aldo Signoretti	(Italy)	Moulin Rouge!	Nominated	
2003	Richard Taylor; Peter King	(United Kingdom)	The Lord of the Rings: The Return of the King	Won	
2003	Martin Samuel	(United Kingdom)	Pirates of the Caribbean: The Curse of the Black Pearl	Nominated	Shared with Ve Neill.
2004	Jo Allen	(United Kingdom)	The Sea Inside	Nominated	
2004	Manuel García	(Spain)	The Sea Inside	Nominated	
2005	Dave Elsey	(United Kingdom)	Star Wars: Episode III – Revenge of the Sith	Nominated	Shared with Nikki Gooley.
2006	David Martí; Montse Ribé	(Spain)	Pan's Labyrinth	Won	
2006	Aldo Signoretti; Vittorio Sodano	(Italy)	Apocalypto	Nominated	
2007	Didier Lavergne	(France)	La Vie en Rose	Won	
2007	Jan Archibald	(United Kingdom)	La Vie en Rose	Won	
2007	Martin Samuel	(United Kingdom)	Pirates of the Caribbean: At World's End	Nominated	Shared with Ve Neill.
2008	Conor O'Sullivan	(United Kingdom)	The Dark Knight	Nominated	Shared with John Caglione Jr.
2009	Jon Henry Gordon; Jenny Shircore	(United Kingdom)	The Young Victoria	Nominated	
2009	Aldo Signoretti; Vittorio Sodano	(Italy)	Il Divo	Nominated	
2010	Dave Elsey	(United Kingdom)	The Wolfman	Won	Shared with Rick Baker.
2011	Mark Coulier	(United Kingdom)	The Iron Lady	Won	Shared with J. Roy Helland.
2011	Lynn Johnson	(Republic of Ireland)	Albert Nobbs	Nominated	Shared with Matthew W. Mungle
2011	Martial Corneville	(France)	Albert Nobbs	Nominated	Shared with Matthew W. Mungle
2011	Nick Dudman; Amanda Knight; Lisa Tomblin	(United Kingdom)	Harry Potter and the Deathly Hallows – Part 2	Nominated	
2012	Lisa Westcott; Julie Dartnell	(United Kingdom)	Les Misérables	Won	
2012	Martin Samuel	(United Kingdom)	Hitchcock	Nominated	Shared with Howard Berger and Peter Montagna.
2012	Peter Swords King	(United Kingdom)	The Hobbit: An Unexpected Journey	Nominated	Shared with Rick Findlater, and Tami Lane.
2014	Frances Hannon; Mark Coulier	(United Kingdom)	The Grand Budapest Hotel	Won	
2014	Elizabeth Yianni-Georgiou; David White	(United Kingdom)	Guardians of the Galaxy	Nominated	
2015	Love Larson; Eva von Bahr	(Sweden)	The 100-Year-Old Man Who Climbed Out of the Window and Disappeared	Nominated	
2015	Siân Grigg; Duncan Jarman	(United Kingdom)	The Revenant	Nominated	Shared with Robert Pandini.
2016	Alessandro Bertolazzi; Giorgio Gregorini	(Italy)	Suicide Squad	Won	Shared with Christopher Nelson.
2016	Love Larson; Eva von Bahr	(Sweden)	A Man Called Ove	Nominated	
2017	David Malinowski; Lucy Sibbick	(United Kingdom)	Darkest Hour	Won	Shared with Kazuhiro Tsuji.
2017	Daniel Phillips; Lou Sheppard	(United Kingdom)	Victoria & Abdul	Nominated	
2017	Arjen Tuiten	(Netherlands)	Wonder	Nominated	
2018	Göran Lundström; Pamela Goldammer	(Sweden)	Border	Nominated	
2018	Jenny Shircore; Marc Pilcher	(United Kingdom)	Mary Queen of Scots	Nominated	Shared with Jessica Brooks.
2019	Naomi Donne; Tristan Versluis; Rebecca Cole	(United Kingdom)	1917	Nominated	
2019	Jeremy Woodhead	(United Kingdom)	Judy	Nominated	
2019	David White	(United Kingdom)	Maleficent: Mistress of Evil	Nominated	Shared with Paul Gooch.
2019	Arjen Tuiten	(Netherlands)	Maleficent: Mistress of Evil	Nominated	Shared with Paul Gooch.
2019	Nicki Ledermann	(Germany)	Joker	Nominated	Shared with Kay Georgiou.
2020	Sergio López-Rivera	(Spain)	Ma Rainey's Black Bottom	Won	Shared with Mia Neal and Jamika Wilson.
2020	Marese Langan	(United Kingdom)	Emma.	Nominated	Shared with Laura Allen.
2020	Claudia Stolze	(Germany) / (United Kingdom)	Emma.	Nominated	Shared with Laura Allen.
2020	Dalia Colli; Francesco Pegoretti	(Italy)	Pinocchio	Nominated	
2020	Mark Coulier	(United Kingdom)	Pinocchio	Nominated	
2021	Nadia Stacey; Naomi Donne; Julia Vernon	(United Kingdom)	Cruella	Nominated	
2021	Donald Mowat	(United Kingdom)	Dune	Nominated	Mowat is Canadian-British.
2021	Love Larson; Eva von Bahr	(Sweden)	Dune	Nominated	
2021	Göran Lundström; Anna Carin Lock	(Sweden)	House of Gucci	Nominated	Shared with Frederic Aspiras.
2022	Heike Merker; Linda Eisenhamerová	(Germany) / (Czech Republic)	All Quiet on the Western Front	Nominated	
2022	Naomi Donne	(United Kingdom) (England)	The Batman	Nominated	Shared with Mike Marino and Mike Fontaine.
2022	Mark Coulier; Aldo Signoretti	(United Kingdom) (England) / (Italy)	Elvis	Nominated	Shared with Jason Baird.
2023	Nadia Stacey; Mark Coulier; Josh Weston	(United Kingdom) (England)	Poor Things	Won	
2023	Karen Hartley Thomas; Suzi Battersby; Ashra Kelly-Blue	(United Kingdom) (England) / (Sweden)	Golda	Nominated	Battersby is of Swedish descent
2023	Ana López-Puigcerver David Martí; Montse Ribé	(Spain)	Society of the Snow	Nominated	
2024	Julia Floch Carbonel; Emmanuel Janvier; Jean-Christophe Spadaccini	(France)	Emilia Pérez	Nominated	
2024	David White; Suzanne Stokes-Munton	(United Kingdom) (England)	Nosferatu	Nominated	
2024	Pierre-Oliver Persin; Stéphanie Guillon; Marilyne Scarselli	(France)	The Substance	Won	
2024	Frances Hannon; Laura Blount; Sarah Nuth	(United Kingdom) (England)	Wicked	Nominated	
2025	Thomas Foldberg; Anne Cathrine Sauerberg	(Denmark)	The Ugly Stepsister	Nominated	

== Best Original Score ==
Best Original Score
Year	Name	Country	Film	Status	Milestone / Notes
1950	Franz Waxman	(Germany)	Sunset Boulevard	Won	Scoring of a Dramatic or Comedy Picture
1950	Max Steiner	(Austria)	The Flame and the Arrow	Nominated	Scoring of a Dramatic or Comedy Picture
1950	Adolph Deutsch	(United Kingdom)	Annie Get Your Gun	Won	Scoring of a Musical Picture; Shared with Roger Edens
1950	Oliver Wallace	(United Kingdom)	Cinderella	Nominated	Scoring of a Musical Picture; Shared with Paul Smith
1950	André Previn	(Germany)	Three Little Words	Nominated	Scoring of a Musical Picture
1951	Franz Waxman	(Germany)	A Place in the Sun	Won	Music Score of a Dramatic or Comedy Picture
1951	Miklós Rózsa	(Hungary)	Quo Vadis	Nominated	Music Score of a Dramatic or Comedy Picture
1951	Oliver Wallace	(United Kingdom)	Alice in Wonderland	Nominated	Scoring of a Musical Picture
1951	Peter Herman Adler	(Austria-Hungary)	The Great Caruso	Nominated	Scoring of a Musical Picture; Shared with Johnny Green
1951	Adolph Deutsch	(United Kingdom)	Show Boat	Nominated	Scoring of a Musical Picture; Shared with Conrad Salinger
1952	Dimitri Tiomkin	(Russian Empire)	High Noon	Won	Music Scoring of a Dramatic or Comedy Picture
1952	Miklós Rózsa	(Hungary)	Ivanhoe	Nominated	Music Scoring of a Dramatic or Comedy Picture
1952	Max Steiner	(Austria)	The Miracle of Our Lady of Fatima	Nominated	Music Scoring of a Dramatic or Comedy Picture
1952	Max Steiner	(Austria)	The Jazz Singer	Nominated	Scoring of a Musical Picture; Shared with Ray Heindorf
1952	Gian Carlo Menotti	(Italy)	The Medium	Nominated	Scoring of a Musical Picture
1953	Bronisław Kaper	(Poland)	Lili	Won	Music Score of a Dramatic or Comedy Picture
1953	Miklós Rózsa	(Hungary)	Julius Caesar	Nominated	Music Score of a Dramatic or Comedy Picture
1953	Friedrich Hollaender	(Germany)	The 5,000 Fingers of Dr. T.	Nominated	Scoring of a Musical Picture; Shared with Morris Stoloff
1953	Adolph Deutsch	(United Kingdom)	The Band Wagon	Nominated	Scoring of a Musical Picture
1953	André Previn	(Germany)	Kiss Me Kate	Nominated	Scoring of a Musical Picture; Shared with Saul Chaplin
1954	Dimitri Tiomkin	(Russian Empire)	The High and the Mighty	Won	Music Score of a Dramatic or Comedy Picture
1954	Max Steiner	(Austria)	The Caine Mutiny	Nominated	Music Score of a Dramatic or Comedy Picture
1954	Franz Waxman	(Germany)	The Silver Chalice	Nominated	Music Score of a Dramatic or Comedy Picture
1954	Adolph Deutsch	(United Kingdom)	Seven Brides for Seven Brothers	Won	Scoring of a Musical Picture; Shared with Saul Chaplin
1955	Max Steiner	(Austria)	Battle Cry	Nominated	Music Score of a Dramatic or Comedy Picture
1955	Adolph Deutsch	(United Kingdom)	Oklahoma!	Won	Scoring of a Musical Picture; Shared with Robert Russell Bennett and Jay Blackton
1955	Cyril J. Mockridge	(United Kingdom)	Guys and Dolls	Nominated	Scoring of a Musical Picture; Shared with Jay Blackton
1955	André Previn	(Germany)	It's Always Fair Weather	Nominated	Scoring of a Musical Picture
1956	Dimitri Tiomkin	(Russian Empire)	Giant	Nominated	Music Score of a Dramatic or Comedy Picture
1957	Malcolm Arnold	(United Kingdom)	The Bridge on the River Kwai	Won	
1958	Dimitri Tiomkin	(Russian Empire)	The Old Man and the Sea	Won	Music Score of a Dramatic or Comedy Picture
1958	Oliver Wallace	(United Kingdom)	White Wilderness	Nominated	Music Score of a Dramatic or Comedy Picture
1958	André Previn	(Germany)	Gigi	Won	Scoring of a Musical Picture
1958	Yuri Fayer; Gennady Rozhdestvensky	(Soviet Union)	The Bolshoi Ballet	Nominated	Scoring of a Musical Picture
1959	Miklós Rózsa	(Hungary)	Ben-Hur	Won	Music Score of a Dramatic or Comedy Picture
1959	Franz Waxman	(Germany)	The Nun's Story	Nominated	Music Score of a Dramatic or Comedy Picture
1959	Ernest Gold	(Austria)	On the Beach	Nominated	Music Score of a Dramatic or Comedy Picture
1959	André Previn	(Germany)	Porgy and Bess	Won	Scoring of a Musical Picture; Shared with Ken Darby
1960	Ernest Gold	(Austria)	Exodus	Won	Music Score of a Dramatic or Comedy Picture
1960	Dimitri Tiomkin	(Russian Empire)	The Alamo	Nominated	Music Score of a Dramatic or Comedy Picture
1960	André Previn	(Germany)	Elmer Gantry	Nominated	Music Score of a Dramatic or Comedy Picture
1960	André Previn	(Germany)	Bells Are Ringing	Nominated	Scoring of a Musical Picture; Shared with Red Mitchell
1961	Miklós Rózsa	(Hungary)	El Cid	Nominated	Music Score of a Dramatic or Comedy Picture
1961	Dimitri Tiomkin	(Russian Empire)	The Guns of Navarone	Nominated	Music Score of a Dramatic or Comedy Picture
1961	Dmitri Shostakovich	(Soviet Union)	Khovanshchina	Nominated	Scoring of a Musical Picture
1962	Maurice Jarre	(France)	Lawrence of Arabia	Won	Music Score — Substantially Original
1962	Bronisław Kaper	(Poland)	Mutiny on the Bounty	Nominated	Music Score — Substantially Original
1962	Franz Waxman	(German Empire)	Taras Bulba	Nominated	Music Score — Substantially Original
1962	Michel Magne	(France)	Gigot	Nominated	Scoring of Music — Adaptation or Treatment
1963	John Addison	(United Kingdom)	Tom Jones	Won	Music Score — Substantially Original
1963	Dimitri Tiomkin	(Russian Empire)	55 Days at Peking	Nominated	Music Score — Substantially Original
1963	Ernest Gold	(Austria)	It's a Mad, Mad, Mad, Mad World	Nominated	Music Score — Substantially Original
1963	André Previn	(Germany)	Irma la Douce	Won	Scoring of Music — Adaptation or Treatment
1963	Maurice Jarre	(France)	Sundays and Cybele	Nominated	Scoring of Music — Adaptation or Treatment
1964	Dimitri Tiomkin	(Russian Empire)	The Fall of the Roman Empire	Nominated	Music Score — Substantially Original
1964	André Previn	(Germany)	My Fair Lady	Won	Scoring of Music — Adaptation or Treatment
1964	George Martin	(United Kingdom)	A Hard Day's Night	Nominated	Scoring of Music — Adaptation or Treatment
1964	Leo Arnaud	(France)	The Unsinkable Molly Brown	Nominated	Scoring of Music — Adaptation or Treatment; Shared with Robert Armbruster, Jack Elliott, Jack Hayes, Calvin Jackson, and Leo Shuken
1965	Maurice Jarre	(France)	Doctor Zhivago	Won	Music Score — Substantially Original
1965	Jacques Demy; Michel Legrand	(France)	The Umbrellas of Cherbourg	Nominated	Music Score — Substantially Original
1965	Michel Legrand	(France)	The Umbrellas of Cherbourg	Nominated	Scoring of Music — Adaptation or Treatment
1966	John Barry	(United Kingdom)	Born Free	Won	Original Music Score
1966	Ken Thorne	(United Kingdom)	A Funny Thing Happened on the Way to the Forum	Nominated	Scoring of Music — Adaptation or Treatment
1966	Luis Bacalov	(Italy)	The Gospel According to St. Matthew	Nominated	Scoring of Music — Adaptation or Treatment
1967	Leslie Bricusse	(United Kingdom)	Doctor Dolittle	Nominated	Original Music Score
1967	Richard Rodney Bennett	(United Kingdom)	Far from the Madding Crowd	Nominated	Original Music Score
1967	André Previn	(Germany)	Thoroughly Modern Millie	Nominated	Scoring of Music — Adaptation or Treatment; Shared with Joseph Gershenson
1968	John Barry	(United Kingdom)	The Lion in Winter	Won	Original Score — For a Motion Picture (Not a Musical)
1968	Michel Legrand	(France)	The Thomas Crown Affair	Nominated	Original Score — For a Motion Picture (Not a Musical)
1968	Michel Legrand; Jacques Demy	(France)	The Young Girls of Rochefort	Nominated	Scoring of a Musical Picture — Original or Adaptation
1969	Georges Delerue	(France)	Anne of the Thousand Days	Nominated	Original Score — For a Motion Picture (Not a Musical)
1969	Ernest Gold	(Austria)	The Secret of Santa Vittoria	Nominated	Original Score — For a Motion Picture (Not a Musical)
1969	Leslie Bricusse	(United Kingdom)	Goodbye, Mr. Chips	Nominated	Scoring of a Musical Picture — Original or Adaptation; Shared with John Williams
1970	Francis Lai	(France)	Love Story	Won	Original Score
1970	Frank Cordell	(United Kingdom)	Cromwell	Nominated	Original Score
1970	The Beatles	(United Kingdom)	Let It Be	Won	Original Song Score
1970	Leslie Bricusse; Ian Fraser	(United Kingdom)	Scrooge	Nominated	Original Song Score
1971	Michel Legrand	(France)	Summer of '42	Won	Original Dramatic Score
1971	John Barry	(United Kingdom)	Mary, Queen of Scots	Nominated	Original Dramatic Score
1971	Richard Rodney Bennett	(United Kingdom)	Nicholas and Alexandra	Nominated	Original Dramatic Score
1971	Peter Maxwell Davies; Peter Greenwell	(United Kingdom)	The Boy Friend	Nominated	Scoring: Adaptation and Original Song Score
1971	Dimitri Tiomkin	(Russian Empire) / (United States)	Tchaikovsky	Nominated	Scoring: Adaptation and Original Song Score
1971	Leslie Bricusse; Anthony Newley	(United Kingdom)	Willy Wonka & the Chocolate Factory	Nominated	Scoring: Adaptation and Original Song Score
1972	Charlie Chaplin	(United Kingdom)	Limelight	Won	Original Dramatic Score; Shared with Raymond Rasch and Larry Russell
1972	Nino Rota	(Italy)	~~The Godfather~~	Nominated	Original Dramatic Score; Nomination rescinded
1972	John Addison	(United Kingdom)	Sleuth	Nominated	Original Dramatic Score
1973	Georges Delerue	(France)	The Day of the Dolphin	Nominated	Original Dramatic Score
1973	John Cameron	(United Kingdom)	A Touch of Class	Nominated	Original Dramatic Score
1973	André Previn; Andrew Lloyd Webber	(Germany) / (United States) (United Kingdom)	Jesus Christ Superstar	Nominated	Scoring: Original Song Score and Adaptation or Scoring: Adaptation; Shared with Herbert W. Spencer
1974	Nino Rota	(Italy)	The Godfather Part II	Won	Original Dramatic Score; Shared with Carmine Coppola
1974	Richard Rodney Bennett	(United Kingdom)	Murder on the Orient Express	Nominated	Original Dramatic Score
1974	Frederick Loewe; Angela Morley	(Austria) / (United States) (United Kingdom)	The Little Prince	Nominated	Scoring: Original Song Score and Adaptation or Scoring: Adaptation; Shared with Alan Jay Lerner and Douglas Gamley
1975	Pete Townshend	(United Kingdom)	Tommy	Nominated	Scoring: Original Song Score and Adaptation or Scoring: Adaptation
1977	Georges Delerue	(France)	Julia	Nominated	Original Dramatic Score
1977	Maurice Jarre	(France)	Mohammad, Messenger of God	Nominated	Original Dramatic Score
1977	Angela Morley	(United Kingdom)	The Slipper and the Rose	Nominated	Original Song Score and Its Adaptation or Adaptation Score; Shared with the Sherman Brothers
1978	Giorgio Moroder	(Italy)	Midnight Express	Won	Original Score
1978	Ennio Morricone	(Italy)	Days of Heaven	Nominated	Original Score
1979	Georges Delerue	(France)	A Little Romance	Won	Original Score
1980	Philippe Sarde	(France)	Tess	Nominated	
1981	Vangelis	(Greece)	Chariots of Fire	Won	
1982	George Fenton	(United Kingdom)	Gandhi	Nominated	Original Score; Shared with Ravi Shankar
1982	Leslie Bricusse	(United Kingdom)	Victor/Victoria	Won	Original Song Score and Its Adaptation or Adaptation Score; Shared with Henry Mancini
1983	Michel Legrand	(France)	Yentl	Won	Original Song Score and Its Adaptation or Adaptation Score; Shared with Alan and Marilyn Bergman
1984	Maurice Jarre	(France)	A Passage to India	Won	Original Score
1985	John Barry	(United Kingdom)	Out of Africa	Won	
1985	Georges Delerue	(France)	Agnes of God	Nominated	
1985	Jeremy Lubbock; Rod Temperton	(United Kingdom)	The Color Purple	Nominated	Shared with Chris Boardman, Jorge Calandrelli, Andraé Crouch, Jack Hayes, Jerry Hey, Quincy Jones, Randy Kerber, Joel Rosenbaum, Caiphus Semenya, and Fred Steiner
1985	Maurice Jarre	(France)	Witness	Nominated	
1986	Ennio Morricone	(Italy)	The Mission	Nominated	
1987	David Byrne	(United Kingdom) / (United States)	The Last Emperor	Won	Shared with Ryuichi Sakamoto and Cong Su
1987	George Fenton	(United Kingdom)	Cry Freedom	Nominated	Shared with Jonas Gwangwa
1987	Ennio Morricone	(Italy)	The Untouchables	Nominated	
1988	George Fenton	(United Kingdom)	Dangerous Liaisons	Nominated	
1988	Maurice Jarre	(France)	Gorillas in the Mist	Nominated	
1988	Hans Zimmer	(Germany)	Rain Man	Nominated	
1990	John Barry	(United Kingdom)	Dances with Wolves	Won	
1990	Maurice Jarre	(France)	Ghost	Nominated	
1991	Ennio Morricone	(Italy)	Bugsy	Nominated	
1991	George Fenton	(United Kingdom)	The Fisher King	Nominated	
1992	John Barry	(United Kingdom)	Chaplin	Nominated	
1994	Hans Zimmer	(Germany)	The Lion King	Won	
1995	Luis Bacalov	(Argentina) / (Italy)	The Postman	Won	Dramatic Score.
1995	Patrick Doyle	(United Kingdom)	Sense and Sensibility	Nominated	Dramatic Score.
1996	Gabriel Yared	(Lebanon) / (France)	The English Patient	Won	Dramatic Score.
1996	Patrick Doyle	(United Kingdom)	Hamlet	Nominated	Dramatic Score.
1996	Rachel Portman	(United Kingdom)	Emma	Won	Musical or Comedy Score.
1996	Hans Zimmer	(Germany)	The Preacher's Wife	Nominated	Musical or Comedy Score.
1997	Anne Dudley	(United Kingdom)	The Full Monty	Won	Musical or Comedy Score.
1997	Hans Zimmer	(Germany)	As Good as It Gets	Nominated	Musical or Comedy Score.
1998	Nicola Piovani	(Italy)	Life Is Beautiful	Won	Dramatic Score.
1998	Stephen Warbeck	(United Kingdom)	Shakespeare in Love	Won	Musical or Comedy Score.
1998	Hans Zimmer	(Germany)	The Thin Red Line	Nominated	Dramatic Score.
1998	Hans Zimmer	(Germany)	The Prince of Egypt	Nominated	Musical or Comedy Score. Shared with Stephen Schwartz.
1999	Rachel Portman	(United Kingdom)	The Cider House Rules	Nominated	
1999	Gabriel Yared	(Lebanon) / (France)	The Talented Mr. Ripley	Nominated	
2000	Rachel Portman	(United Kingdom)	Chocolat	Nominated	
2000	Hans Zimmer	(Germany)	Gladiator	Nominated	
2000	Ennio Morricone	(Italy)	Malèna	Nominated	
2003	Gabriel Yared	(Lebanon) / (France)	Cold Mountain	Nominated	
2004	Jan A. P. Kaczmarek	(Poland)	Finding Neverland	Won	
2005	Alberto Iglesias	(Spain)	The Constant Gardener	Nominated	
2005	Dario Marianelli	(Italy)	Pride & Prejudice	Nominated	
2006	Javier Navarrete	(Spain)	Pan's Labyrinth	Nominated	
2006	Alexandre Desplat	(France)	The Queen	Nominated	
2007	Dario Marianelli	(Italy)	Atonement	Won	
2007	Alberto Iglesias	(Spain)	The Kite Runner	Nominated	
2008	Alexandre Desplat	(France)	The Curious Case of Benjamin Button	Nominated	
2009	Alexandre Desplat	(France)	Fantastic Mr. Fox	Nominated	
2009	Hans Zimmer	(Germany)	Sherlock Holmes	Nominated	
2010	Atticus Ross	(United Kingdom)	The Social Network	Won	Shared with Trent Reznor.
2010	John Powell	(United Kingdom)	How to Train Your Dragon	Nominated	
2010	Hans Zimmer	(Germany)	Inception	Nominated	
2010	Alexandre Desplat	(France)	The King's Speech	Nominated	
2011	Ludovic Bource	(France)	The Artist	Won	
2011	Alberto Iglesias	(Spain)	Tinker Tailor Soldier Spy	Nominated	
2012	Dario Marianelli	(Italy)	Anna Karenina	Nominated	
2012	Alexandre Desplat	(France)	Argo	Nominated	
2013	Steven Price	(United Kingdom)	Gravity	Won	
2013	Alexandre Desplat	(France)	Philomena	Nominated	
2014	Alexandre Desplat	(France)	The Grand Budapest Hotel	Won	
2014	Alexandre Desplat	(France)	The Imitation Game	Nominated	
2014	Hans Zimmer	(Germany)	Interstellar	Nominated	
2014	Gary Yershon	(United Kingdom)	Mr. Turner	Nominated	
2014	Jóhann Jóhannsson	(Iceland)	The Theory of Everything	Nominated	
2015	Ennio Morricone	(Italy)	The Hateful Eight	Won	
2015	Jóhann Jóhannsson	(Iceland)	Sicario	Nominated	
2016	Micachu	(United Kingdom)	Jackie	Nominated	
2016	Hauschka	(Germany)	Lion	Nominated	Shared with Dustin O'Halloran.
2017	Jonny Greenwood	(United Kingdom)	Phantom Thread	Nominated	
2017	Hans Zimmer	(Germany)	Dunkirk	Nominated	
2017	Alexandre Desplat	(France)	The Shape of Water	Won	
2018	Alexandre Desplat	(France)	Isle of Dogs	Nominated	
2018	Ludwig Göransson	(Sweden)	Black Panther	Won	
2019	Hildur Guðnadóttir	(Iceland)	Joker	Won	
2019	Alexandre Desplat	(France)	Little Women	Nominated	
2020/2021	Atticus Ross	(United Kingdom)	Soul	Won	Shared with Jon Batiste and Trent Reznor.
2020/2021	Atticus Ross	(United Kingdom)	Mank	Nominated	Shared with Trent Reznor.
2021	Hans Zimmer	(Germany)	Dune	Won	
2021	Jonny Greenwood	(United Kingdom)	The Power of the Dog	Nominated	
2021	Alberto Iglesias	(Spain)	Parallel Mothers	Nominated	
2022	Hauschka	(Germany)	All Quiet on the Western Front	Won	
2023	Ludwig Göransson	(Sweden)	Oppenheimer	Won	
2023	Jerskin Fendrix	(United Kingdom) (England)	Poor Things	Nominated	
2024	Daniel Blumberg	(United Kingdom) (England)	The Brutalist	Won	
2024	John Powell	(United Kingdom) (England)	Wicked	Nominated	Shared with Stephen Schwartz
2025	Jerskin Fendrix	(United Kingdom) (England)	Bugonia	Nominated	
2025	Alexandre Desplat	(France)	Frankenstien	Nominated	
2025	Max Richter	(Germany) (United Kingdom)	Hamnet	Nominated	
2025	Jonny Greenwood	(United Kingdom) (England)	One Battle After Another	Nominated	
2025	Ludwig Göransson	(Sweden)	Sinners	Won	

== Best International Feature Film ==
International Feature Film
Year	Country	Film	Original Title	Director	Status	Notes
1947	(Italy)	Shoeshine	Sciuscià	Vittorio De Sica	Won	Special Honorary Award.
1948	(France)	Monsieur Vincent		Maurice Cloche	Won	Special Honorary Award.
1949	(Italy)	Bicycle Thieves	Ladri di biciclette	Vittorio De Sica	Won	Special Honorary Award.
1950	(France) / (Italy)	The Walls of Malapaga	Au-delà des grilles Le mura di Malapaga	René Clément	Won	Special Honorary Award.
1956	(France)	Forbidden Games	Jeux interdits	René Clément	Won	Special Honorary Award.
1953	(France)	Gervaise		René Clément	Nominated	
1953	(Denmark)	Qivitoq - Fjeldgængeren		Erik Balling	Nominated	
1953	(West Germany)	The Captain from Köpenick	Der Hauptmann von Köpenick	Helmut Käutner	Nominated	
1953	(Italy)	La Strada		Federico Fellini	Won	
1957	(Italy)	Nights of Cabiria	Le notti di Cabiria	Federico Fellini	Won	
1957	(Norway)	Nine Lives	Ni Liv	Arne Skouen	Nominated	
1957	(France)	Gates of Paris	Porte des Lilas	René Clair	Nominated	
1957	(West Germany)	The Devil Strikes at Night	Nachts, wenn der Teufel kam	Robert Siodmak	Nominated	
1958	(West Germany)	Arms and the Man	Helden	Franz Peter Wirth	Nominated	
1958	(Spain)	Vengeance	La Venganza	Juan Antonio Bardem	Nominated	
1958	(Italy)	Big Deal on Madonna Street	I soliti ignoti	Mario Monicelli	Nominated	
1958	(France)	Mon Oncle		Jacques Tati	Won	
1959	(France)	Black Orpheus	Orfeu Negro	Marcel Camus	Won	
1959	(Denmark)	Paw		Astrid Henning-Jensen	Nominated	
1959	(Netherlands)	The Village on the River	Dorp aan de rivier	Fons Rademakers	Nominated	
1959	(West Germany)	The Bridge	Die Brücke	Bernhard Wicki	Nominated	
1959	(Italy)	The Great War	La Grande Guerra	Mario Monicelli	Nominated	
1960	(Italy)	Kapò		Gillo Pontecorvo	Nominated	
1960	(Socialist Federal Republic of Yugoslavia)	The Ninth Circle	Deveti krug Девети круг	France Štiglic	Nominated	
1960	(France)	La Vérité		Henri-Georges Clouzot	Nominated	
1960	(Sweden)	The Virgin Spring	Jungfrukällan	Ingmar Bergman	Won	
1961	(Sweden)	Through a Glass Darkly	Såsom i en spegel	Ingmar Bergman	Won	
1961	(Denmark)	Harry and the Butler	Harry og kammertjeneren	Bent Christensen	Nominated	
1961	(Spain)	Plácido		Luis García Berlanga	Nominated	
1962	(France)	Sundays and Cybele	Les Dimanches de Ville d'Avray	Serge Bourguignon	Won	
1962	(Italy)	The Four Days of Naples	Le Quattro Giornate di Napoli	Nanni Loy	Nominated	
1962	(Greece)	Electra	Ilektra; Ηλέκτρα	Michael Cacoyannis	Nominated	
1963	(Greece)	The Red Lanterns	Ta Kokkina fanaria Τα κόκκινα φανάρια	Vasilis Georgiadis	Nominated	
1963	(Spain)	Los Tarantos		Francisco Rovira Beleta	Nominated	
1963	(Poland)	Knife in the Water	Nóż w wodzie	Roman Polanski	Nominated	
1963	(Italy)	8½		Federico Fellini	Won	
1964	(Italy)	Yesterday, Today and Tomorrow	Ieri, Oggi e Domani	Vittorio De Sica	Won	
1964	(France)	The Umbrellas of Cherbourg	Les Parapluies de Cherbourg	Jacques Demy	Nominated	
1964	(Sweden)	Raven's End	Kvarteret Korpen	Bo Widerberg	Nominated	
1965	(Sweden)	Dear John	Käre John	Lars-Magnus Lindgren	Nominated	
1965	(Italy)	Marriage Italian Style	Matrimonio all'italiana	Vittorio De Sica	Nominated	
1965	(Greece)	Blood on the Land	To Homa vaftike kokkino Το χώμα βάφτηκε κόκκινο	Vasilis Georgiadis	Nominated	
1965	(Czechoslovakia)	The Shop on Main Street	Obchod na korze	Ján Kadár and Elmar Klos	Won	
1966	(Czechoslovakia)	Loves of a Blonde	Lásky jedné plavovlásky	Miloš Forman	Nominated	
1966	(France)	A Man and a Woman	Un homme et une femme	Claude Lelouch	Won	
1966	(Italy)	The Battle of Algiers	La battaille d'Alger; La battaglia di Algeri	Gillo Pontecorvo	Nominated	
1966	(Poland)	Pharaoh	Faraon	Jerzy Kawalerowicz	Nominated	
1966	(Socialist Federal Republic of Yugoslavia)	Three	Tri; Три	Aleksandar Petrović	Nominated	
1967	(Socialist Federal Republic of Yugoslavia)	I Even Met Happy Gypsies	Skupljači perja Скупљачи перја	Aleksandar Petrović	Nominated	
1967	(France)	Live for Life	Vivre pour vivre	Claude Lelouch	Nominated	
1967	(Spain)	Bewitched Love	El Amor Brujo	Francisco Rovira Beleta	Nominated	
1967	(Czechoslovakia)	Closely Watched Trains	Ostře sledované vlaky	Jiří Menzel	Won	
1968	(Czechoslovakia)	The Fireman's Ball	Hoří, má panenko	Miloš Forman	Nominated	
1968	(Hungary)	The Boys of Paul Street	A Pál-utcai fiúk	Zoltán Fábri	Nominated	
1968	(France)	Stolen Kisses	Baisers volés	François Truffaut	Nominated	
1968	(Italy)	The Girl with the Pistol	La Ragazza con la Pistola	Mario Monicelli	Nominated	
1968	(Soviet Union)	War and Peace	Voyna i mir Война и мир	Sergei Bondarchuk	Won	
1969	(Soviet Union)	The Brothers Karamazov	Bratya Karamazovy; Братья Карамазовы	Kirill Lavrov, Ivan Pyryev and Mikhail Ulyanov	Nominated	
1969	(Sweden)	Ådalen 31		Bo Widerberg	Nominated	
1969	(Socialist Federal Republic of Yugoslavia)	Battle of Neretva	Bitka na Neretvi; Битка на Неретви	Veljko Bulajić	Nominated	
1969	(France)	My Night at Maud's	Ma nuit chez Maud	Éric Rohmer	Nominated	
1970	(France)	Hoa-Binh		Raoul Coutard	Nominated	
1970	(Switzerland)	First Love	Erste Liebe	Maximilian Schell	Nominated	
1970	(Belgium)	Peace in the Fields	Paix sur les champs	Jacques Boigelot	Nominated	
1970	(Spain)	Tristana		Luis Buñuel	Nominated	
1970	(Italy)	Investigation of a Citizen Above Suspicion	Indagine su un cittadino al di sopra di ogni sospetto	Elio Petri	Won	
1971	(Italy)	The Garden of the Finzi-Contini	Il giardino dei Finzi-Contini	Vittorio De Sica	Won	
1971	(Soviet Union)	Tchaikovsky	Chaykovskiy; Чайковский	Igor Talankin	Nominated	
1971	(Sweden)	The Emigrants	Utvandrarna	Jan Troell	Nominated	
1972	(Sweden)	The New Land	Nybyggarna	Jan Troell	Nominated	
1972	(Spain)	My Dearest Senorita	Mi Querida Señorita	Jaime de Armiñán	Nominated	
1972	(Soviet Union)	The Dawns Here Are Quiet	A zori zdes tikhie А зори здесь тихие	Stanislav Rostotsky	Nominated	
1972	(France)	The Discreet Charm of the Bourgeoisie	Le Charme discret de la bourgeoisie	Luis Buñuel	Won	
1973	(France)	Day for Night	La Nuit Américaine	François Truffaut	Won	
1973	(Switzerland)	The Invitation	L'Invitation	Claude Goretta	Nominated	
1973	(West Germany)	The Pedestrian	Der Fußgänger	Maximilian Schell	Nominated	
1973	(Netherlands)	Turkish Delight	Turks fruit	Paul Verhoeven	Nominated	
1974	(Italy)	Amarcord		Federico Fellini	Won	
1974	(France)	Lacombe, Lucien	Lacombe Lucien	Louis Malle	Nominated	
1974	(Hungary)	Cat's Play	Macskajáték	Károly Makk	Nominated	
1974	(Poland)	The Deluge	Potop	Jerzy Hoffman	Nominated	
1975	(Poland)	The Promised Land	Ziemia obiecana	Andrzej Wajda	Nominated	
1975	(Soviet Union)	Dersu Uzala	Дерсу Узала	Károly Makk	Won	
1975	(Italy)	Scent of a Woman	Profumo di donna	Dino Risi	Nominated	
1976	(Italy)	Seven Beauties	Pasqualino Settebellezze	Lina Wertmüller	Nominated	
1976	(Poland)	Nights and Days	Noce i dnie	Jerzy Antczak	Nominated	
1976	(East Germany)	Jacob the Liar	Jakob der Lügner	Frank Beyer	Nominated	
1976	(France)	Cousin Cousine	Cousin, Cousine	Jean-Charles Tacchella	Nominated	
1977	(France)	Madame Rosa	La Vie devant Soi	Moshé Mizrahi	Won	
1977	(Greece)	Iphigenia	Ifigeneia; Ιφιγένεια	Michael Cacoyannis	Nominated	
1977	(Spain)	That Obscure Object of Desire	Cet obscur objet du désir Este oscuro objeto de deseo	Luis Buñuel	Nominated	
1977	(Italy)	A Special Day	Una giornata particolare	Ettore Scola	Nominated	
1978	(Italy)	Viva Italia!	I nuovi mostri	Mario Monicelli, Dino Risi and Ettore Scola	Nominated	
1978	(Hungary)	Hungarians	Magyarok	Zoltán Fábri	Nominated	
1978	(Soviet Union)	White Bim Black Ear	Belyy Bim - Chyornoe ukho Белый Бим Чёрное ухо	Stanislav Rostotsky	Nominated	
1978	(France)	Get Out Your Handkerchiefs	Préparez vos mouchoirs	Bertrand Blier	Won	
1978	(West Germany)	The Glass Cell	Die gläserne Zelle	Hans W. Geißendörfer	Won	
1979	(West Germany)	The Tin Drum	Die Blechtrommel	Volker Schlöndorff	Won	
1979	(Poland)	The Maids of Wilko	Panny z Wilka	Andrzej Wajda	Nominated	
1979	(Italy)	To Forget Venice	Dimenticare Venezia	Franco Brusati	Nominated	
1979	(France)	A Simple Story	Une histoire simple	Claude Sautet	Nominated	
1979	(Spain)	Mama Turns 100	Mamá cumple 100 años	Carlos Saura	Nominated	
1980	(Spain)	The Nest	El Nido	Jaime de Armiñán	Nominated	
1980	(Soviet Union)	Moscow Does Not Believe in Tears	Moskva slezam ne verit Москва слезам не верит	Vladimir Menshov	Won	
1980	(France)	The Last Metro	Le Dernier Métro	François Truffaut	Nominated	
1980	(Hungary)	Confidence	Bizalom	István Szabó	Nominated	
1981	(Hungary)	Mephisto		István Szabó	Won	
1981	(Switzerland)	The Boat Is Full	Das Boot ist voll	Markus Imhoof	Nominated	
1981	(Poland)	Man of Iron	Człowiek z żelaza	Andrzej Wajda	Nominated	
1981	(Italy)	Three Brothers	Tre fratelli	Francesco Rosi	Nominated	
1982	(Spain)	Begin to Beguine	Volver a Empezar	José Luis Garci	Won	
1982	(France)	Coup de Torchon		Bertrand Tavernier	Nominated	
1982	(Soviet Union)	Private Life	Chastnaya zhizn Частная жизньн	Yuli Raizman	Nominated	
1982	(Sweden)	Flight of the Eagle	Ingenjör Andrées luftfärd	Jan Troell	Nominated	
1983	(Sweden)	Fanny and Alexander	Fanny och Alexander	Ingmar Bergman	Won	
1983	(France)	Entre Nous	Coup de foudre	Diane Kurys	Nominated	
1983	(Hungary)	The Revolt of Job	Jób lázadása	Imre Gyöngyössy and Barna Kabay	Nominated	
1983	(Spain)	Carmen		Carlos Saura	Nominated	
1984	(Spain)	Double Feature	Sesión continua	José Luis Garci	Nominated	
1984	(Soviet Union)	Wartime Romance	'Voenno-polevoy roman Военно-полевой роман	Pyotr Todorovsky	Nominated	
1984	(Switzerland)	Dangerous Moves	La Diagonale du fou	Richard Dembo	Won	
1985	(West Germany)	Angry Harvest	Bittere Ernte	Agnieszka Holland	Nominated	
1985	(Hungary)	Colonel Redl	'Oberst Redl; Redl ezredes	István Szabó	Nominated	
1985	(France)	Three Men and a Cradle	Trois hommes et un couffin	Coline Serreau	Nominated	
1985	(Socialist Federal Republic of Yugoslavia)	When Father Was Away on Business	Otac na službenom putu Отац на службеном путу	Emir Kusturica	Nominated	
1986	(Netherlands)	The Assault	De aanslag	Fons Rademakers	Won	
1986	(Austria)	'38 – Vienna Before the Fall	'38 – Auch das war Wien	Wolfgang Glück	Nominated	
1986	(Czechoslovakia)	My Sweet Little Village	Vesničko má středisková	Jiří Menzel	Nominated	
1986	(France)	Betty Blue	37°2 le matin	Jean-Jacques Beineix	Nominated	
1987	(France)	Au revoir les enfants		Louis Malle	Nominated	
1987	(Denmark)	Babette's Feast	Babettes Gæstebud	Gabriel Axel	Won	
1987	(Norway)	Pathfinder	Ofelaš; Veiviseren	Nils Gaup	Nominated	
1987	(Italy)	The Family	La Famiglia	Ettore Scola	Nominated	
1987	(Spain)	Course Completed	Asignatuda aprobada	José Luis Garci	Nominated	
1988	(Spain)	Women on the Verge of a Nervous Breakdown	Mujeres al Borde de un ataque de nervios	Pedro Almodóvar	Nominated	
1988	(Hungary)	Hanussen		István Szabó	Nominated	
1988	(Belgium)	The Music Teacher	Le maître de musique	Gérard Corbiau	Nominated	
1988	(Denmark)	Pelle the Conqueror	Pelle Erobreren	Bille August	Won	
1989	(Denmark)	Waltzing Regitze	Dansen med Regitze	Kaspar Rostrup	Nominated	
1989	(Italy)	Cinema Paradiso	Nuovo Cinema Paradiso	Giuseppe Tornatore	Won	
1989	(France)	Camille Claudel		Bruno Nuytten	Nominated	
1990	(France)	Cyrano de Bergerac		Jean-Paul Rappeneau	Nominated	
1990	(Switzerland)	Journey of Hope	Reise der Hoffnung	Xavier Koller	Won	
1990	(Germany)	The Nasty Girl	Das schreckliche Mädchen	Michael Verhoeven	Nominated	
1990	(Italy)	Open Doors	Porte aperte	Gianni Amelio	Nominated	
1991	(Italy)	Mediterraneo		Gabriele Salvatores	Won	
1991	(Iceland)	Children of Nature	Börn náttúrunnar	Friðrik Þór Friðriksson	Nominated	
1991	(Czechoslovakia)	The Elementary School	Obecná škola	Jan Svěrák	Nominated	
1991	(Sweden)	The Ox	Oxen	Sven Nykvist	Nominated	
1992	(Russia)	Close to Eden	Urga; Урга	Nikita Mikhalkov	Nominated	
1992	(Belgium)	Daens		Stijn Coninx	Nominated	
1992	(France)	Indochine		Régis Wargnier	Won	
1992	(Germany)	Schtonk!		Helmut Dietl	Nominated	
1993	(Spain)	Belle Époque		Fernando Trueba	Won	
1993	(United Kingdom)	Hedd Wyn		Paul Turner	Nominated	
1994	(North Macedonia)	Before the Rain	Pred dozhdot Пред дождот	Milcho Manchevski	Nominated	
1994	(Russia)	Burnt by the Sun	Utomlyonnye solntsem Утомлённые солнцем	Nikita Mikhalkov	Won	
1994	(Belgium)	Farinelli: Il Castrato	Farinelli	Gérard Corbiau	Nominated	
1995	(Netherlands)	Antonia's Line	Antonia	Marleen Gorris	Won	
1995	(Sweden)	All Things Fair	Lust och fägring stor	Bo Widerberg	Nominated	
1995	(Italy)	The Star Maker	L'Uomo delle Stelle	Giuseppe Tornatore	Nominated	
1996	(Czech Republic)	Kolya	Kolja	Jan Svěrák	Won	
1996	(Georgia (country))	A Chef in Love	Shekvarebuli kulinaris ataserti retsepti შეყვარებული კულინარის 1001 რეცეპტი	Nana Jorjadze	Nominated	
1996	(Norway)	The Other Side of Sunday	Søndagsengler	Berit Nesheim	Nominated	
1996	(France)	Ridicule		Patrice Leconte	Nominated	
1996	(Russia)	Prisoner of the Mountains	Kavkazskiy plennik Кавказский пленник	Sergei Bodrov	Nominated	
1997	(Russia)	The Thief	Vor; Вор	Pavel Chukhray	Nominated	
1997	(Netherlands)	Character	Karakter	Mike van Diem	Won	
1997	(Germany)	Beyond Silence	Jenseits der Stille	Caroline Link	Nominated	
1997	(Spain)	Secrets of the Heart	Secretos del Corazón	Montxo Armendáriz	Won	
1998	(Italy)	Life is Beautiful	La vita è bella	Roberto Benigni	Won	
1998	(Spain)	The Grandfather	El Abuelo	José Luis Garci	Nominated	
1999	(Spain)	All About My Mother	Todo sobre mi madre	Pedro Almodóvar	Won	
1999	(United Kingdom)	Solomon & Gaenor	Solomon a Gaenor	Paul Morrison	Nominated	
1999	(Sweden)	Under the Sun	Under solen	Colin Nutley	Nominated	
2000	(Czech Republic)	Divided We Fall	Musíme si pomáhat	Jan Hřebejk	Nominated	
2000	(Belgium)	Everybody's Famous!	Iedereen beroemd!	Dominique Deruddere	Nominated	
2000	(France)	The Taste of Others	Le goût des autres	Agnès Jaoui	Nominated	
2001	(France)	Amélie	Le fabuleux destin d'Amélie Poulain	Jean-Pierre Jeunet	Nominated	
2001	(Bosnia and Herzegovina)	No Man's Land	Ničija zemlja	Danis Tanović	Won	
2001	(Norway)	Elling		Petter Næss	Nominated	
2002	(Finland)	The Man Without a Past	Mies vailla menneisyyttä	Aki Kaurismäki	Nominated	
2002	(Germany)	Nowhere in Africa	Nirgendwo in Afrika	Caroline Link	Won	
2002	(Netherlands)	Zus & Zo		Paula van der Oest	Nominated	
2003	(Netherlands)	Twin Sisters	De tweeling	Ben Sombogaart	Nominated	
2003	(Czech Republic)	Želary		Ondřej Trojan	Nominated	
2003	(Sweden)	Evil	Ondskan	Mikael Håfström	Nominated	
2004	(Sweden)	As It Is in Heaven	Så som i himmelen	Kay Pollak	Nominated	
2004	(Germany)	Downfall	Der Untergang	Oliver Hirschbiegel	Nominated	
2004	(Spain)	The Sea Inside	Mar Adentro	Alejandro Amenábar	Won	
2004	(France)	The Chorus	Les choristes	Christophe Barratier	Nominated	
2005	(France)	Joyeux Noël		Christian Carion	Nominated	
2005	(Italy)	Don't Tell	La bestia nel cuore	Cristina Comencini	Nominated	
2005	(Germany)	Sophie Scholl – The Final Days	Sophie Scholl - Die letzten Tage	Marc Rothemund	Nominated	
2006	(Germany)	The Lives of Others	Das Leben der Anderen	Florian Henckel von Donnersmarck	Won	
2006	(Denmark)	After the Wedding	Efter brylluppet	Susanne Bier	Nominated	
2007	(Poland)	Katyń		Andrzej Wajda	Nominated	
2007	(Russia)	12		Nikita Mikhalkov	Nominated	
2007	(Austria)	The Counterfeiters	Die Fälscher	Stefan Ruzowitzky	Won	
2008	(Austria)	Revanche	Revanche	Götz Spielmann	Nominated	
2008	(Germany)	The Baader Meinhof Complex	Der Baader Meinhof Komplex	Uli Edel	Nominated	
2008	(France)	The Class	Entre les murs	Laurent Cantet	Nominated	
2009	(France)	A Prophet	Un prophète	Jacques Audiard	Nominated	
2009	(Germany)	The White Ribbon	Das weiße Band	Michael Haneke	Nominated	
2010	(Greece)	Dogtooth	Kynodontas; Κυνόδοντας	Yorgos Lanthimos	Nominated	
2010	(Denmark)	In a Better World	Hævnen	Susanne Bier	Won	
2011	(Belgium)	Bullhead	Rundskop	Michaël R. Roskam	Nominated	
2011	(Poland)	In Darkness	W ciemności	Agnieszka Holland	Nominated	
2012	(Austria)	Amour		Michael Haneke	Won	
2012	(Norway)	Kon-Tiki		Joachim Rønning and Espen Sandberg	Nominated	
2012	(Denmark)	A Royal Affair	En kongelig affære	Nikolaj Arcel	Nominated	
2013	(Denmark)	The Hunt	Jagten	Thomas Vinterberg	Nominated	
2013	(Belgium)	The Broken Circle Breakdown		Felix van Groeningen	Nominated	
2013	(Italy)	The Great Beauty	La Grande Bellezza	Paolo Sorrentino	Won	
2014	(Poland)	Ida		Paweł Pawlikowski	Won	
2014	(Russia)	Leviathan	Левиафан	Andrey Zvyagintsev	Nominated	
2014	(Estonia)	Tangerines	Mandariinid	Zaza Urushadze	Nominated	
2015	(France)	Mustang		Deniz Gamze Ergüven	Nominated	
2015	(Hungary)	Son of Saul	Saul fia	László Nemes	Won	
2015	(Denmark)	A War	Krigen	Tobias Lindholm	Nominated	
2016	(Denmark)	Land of Mine	Under sandet	Martin Zandvliet	Nominated	
2016	(Germany)	Toni Erdmann		Maren Ade	Nominated	
2016	(Sweden)	A Man Called Ove	En man som heter Ove	Hannes Holm	Nominated	
2017	(Sweden)	The Square		Ruben Östlund	Nominated	
2017	(Russia)	Loveless	Nelyubov; Нелюбовь	Andrey Zvyagintsev	Nominated	
2017	(Hungary)	On Body and Soul	Testről és lélekről	Ildikó Enyedi	Nominated	
2018	(Germany)	Never Look Away	Werk ohne Autor	Florian Henckel von Donnersmarck	Nominated	
2018	(Poland)	Cold War	Zimna wojna	Paweł Pawlikowski	Nominated	
2019	(Poland)	Corpus Christi	Boże Ciało	Jan Komasa	Nominated	
2019	(North Macedonia)	Honeyland	Medena Zemja; Медена земја	Tamara Kotevska and Ljubomir Stefanov	Nominated	
2019	(France)	Les Misérables		Ladj Ly	Nominated	
2019	(Spain)	Pain and Glory	Dolor y Gloria	Pedro Almodóvar	Nominated	
2020/2021	(Romania)	Collective	Colectiv	Alexander Nanau	Nominated	
2020/2021	(Bosnia and Herzegovina)	Quo Vadis Aida?		Jasmila Žbanić	Nominated	
2020/2021	(Denmark)	Another Round	Druk	Thomas Vinterberg	Won	
2021	(Denmark)	Flee	Flugt	Jonas Poher Rasmussen	Nominated	
2021	(Italy)	The Hand of God	È stata la mano di Dio	Paolo Sorrentino	Nominated	
2021	(Norway)	The Worst Person in the World	Verdens verste menneske	Joachim Trier	Nominated	
2022	(Belgium)	Close		Lukas Dhont	Nominated	
2022	(Poland)	EO	IO	Jerzy Skolimowski	Nominated	
2022	(Republic of Ireland)	The Quiet Girl	An Cailín Ciúin	Colm Bairéad	Nominated	
2022	(Germany)	All Quiet on the Western Front	Im Westen nichts Neues	Edward Berger	Won	
2023	(Germany)	The Teachers' Lounge	Das Lehrerzimmer	İlker Çatak	Nominated	
2023	(Italy)	Io Capitano		Matteo Garrone	Nominated	
2023	(Spain)	Society of the Snow	Sociedad de la Nieve	J. A. Bayona	Nominated	
2023	(United Kingdom)	The Zone of Interest		Jonathan Glazer	Won	
2024	(France)	Emilia Pérez		Jacques Audiard	Nominated	
2024	(Latvia)	Flow	Straume	Gints Zilbalodis	Nominated	
2024	(Denmark)	The Girl with the Needle	Pigen med nålen	Magnus von Horn	Nominated	
2024	(Germany)	The Seed of the Sacred Fig	دانه‌ی انجیر معابد / Die Saat des heiligen Feigenbaums	Mohammad Rasoulof	Nominated	
2025	(France)	It Was Just an Accident	یک تصادف ساده / Un simple accident	Jafar Panahi	Nominated	
2025	(Norway)	Sentimental Value	Affeksjonsverdi	Joachim Trier	Won	
2025	(Spain)	Sirāt		Óliver Laxe	Nominated	
