= Rudolf von Urban =

Austrian psychiatrist and psychologist

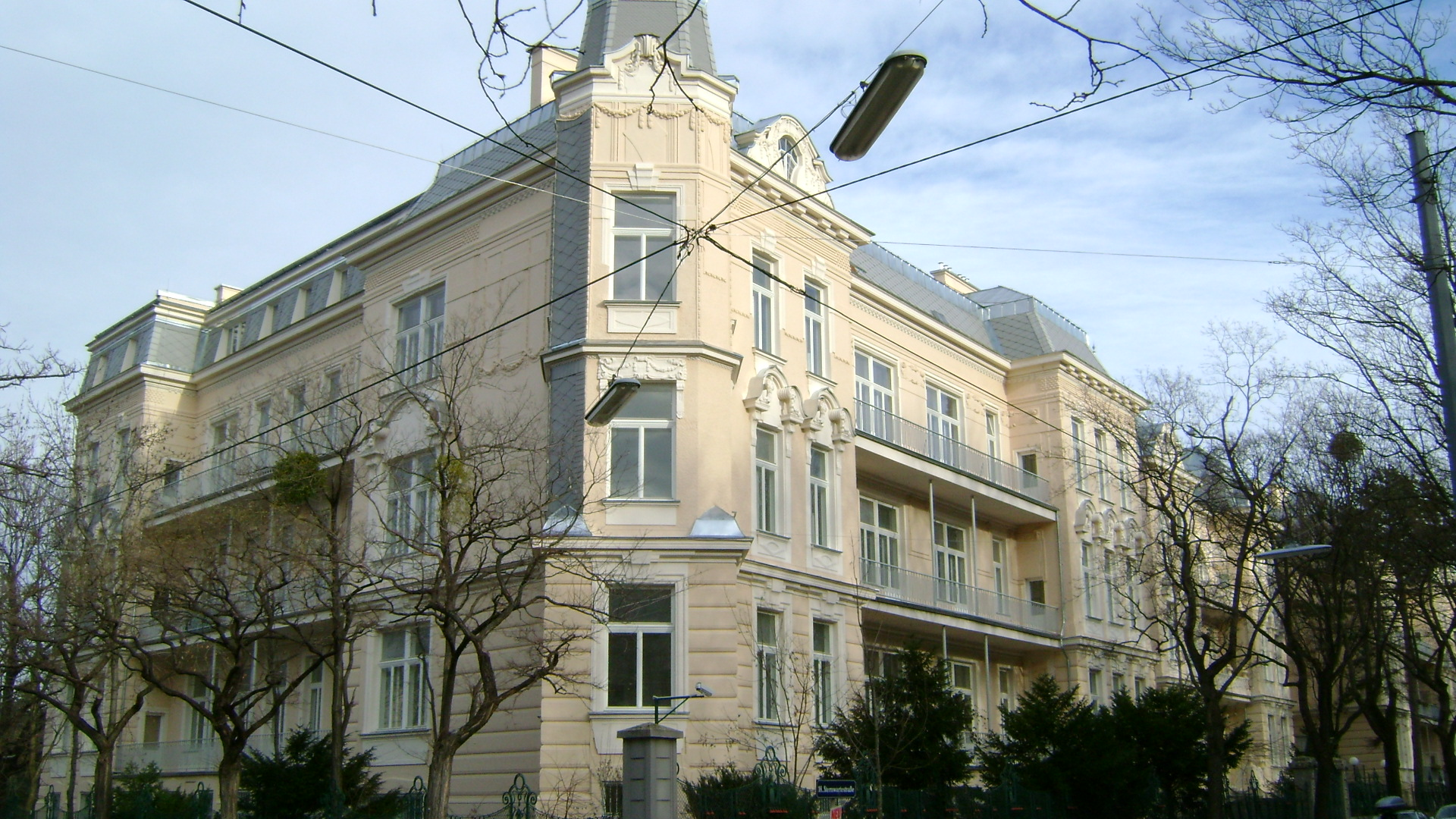
Wiener Cottage Sanatorium building, Vienna, 2008

Rudolf R. Urbantschitsch, later Rudolf von Urban (28 April 1879 – 18 December 1964), was an Austrian psychiatrist and psychologist who researched human sexuality.

== Early life and education ==
Born in Vienna to a Catholic family, he was the son of Viktor Urbantschitsch, a physician and one of the founders of modern ENT medicine. His uncle, Carl Fröschl, was a portrait painter. Rudolf von Urban studied at the Vienna Theresianum, graduating in 1898.

== Career ==
Early in his career, he worked as assistant to the internist Carl von Noorden. With Noorden's support he opened the prestigious Wiener Cottage Sanatorium as a clinic for the aristocracy in 1908.

In January 1908 he presented a paper, "Meine Entwicklungsjahre bis zur Ehe" (From my puberty to my marriage), to a group of Viennese psychoanalysts to whom he had been introduced by the physician Fritz Wittels. He became a member of the Vienna Psychoanalytic Society (known then as the "Wednesday Psychological Society"), and remained a member of it until 1914.

With Noorden's support and under the patronage of Archduke Franz Ferdinand, he opened the prestigious Wiener Cottage Sanatorium in 1908, serving as its director. The sanatorium became one of the most prestigious clinics in Europe, treating patients from the highest level of Viennese society. Among the doctors who sent their patients to the clinic was Sigmund Freud.

In 1920, Urbantschitsch lost his position as director of the sanatorium, which was sold in 1922. On Freud's recommendation, he then began to train as an analyst, first with Paul Federn and then with Sándor Ferenczi in Budapest. Because he was a Catholic, an aristocrat, and a monarchist, Urbantschitsch was an outlier in the Vienna Psychoanalytic Society.

In the ensuing years he lectured widely in Austria and abroad, giving a series of lectures on sexology at the University of Athens in 1933. His popularization of the ideas of psychoanalysis subjected him to criticism by his some of his Viennese colleagues, who also objected to his love affairs, two of which resulted in suicide. Consequently the Vienna Psychoanalytic Society declined to renew his membership, and in 1924 even refused to welcome him as a guest.

In response to the looming threat of Nazism, he fled Austria in late 1936, settling first in Los Angeles, where he worked as a psychotherapist, and moving the next year to San Francisco and to Carmel in 1941. Part of the reason for the brevity of his sojourn in Los Angeles was the opposition of psychoanalysts there to his theories and his therapeutic approaches. In 1938 he spoke at a neuropsychiatric conference at the University of California in San Francisco, and later spoke at a medical meeting at Stanford. In 1944 Urbantschitsch was accused of practicing medicine illegally.

=== Sex Perfection and Marital Happiness ===
His book Sex Perfection and Marital Happiness was published by Dial Press in 1949. In the book, which opens with chapters on “Sex Development of Children,” “Talking to Children about Sex,” and “The Problem of Masturbation,” and goes on to discuss his “Six Rules of Sex Intercourse,” birth control, impotence, frigidity, and other subjects, von Urban argues that the avoidance of orgasm during sexual intercourse can result in a flow of energy that prolongs and enhances sexual intercourse. In his “six rules” he recommends extended foreplay, a certain sexual position, full concentration, and complete relaxation, states that the ideal sex act should take at least 27 minutes, and counsels a five-day break between sexual encounters.

The methods he advocated are similar to those promoted by J. William Lloyd and Alice Bunker Stockham and to those associated with “tantric sex.”

Kirkus Reviews stated that “Dr. Von Urban makes his most startling contribution with his belief in the ‘bio-electrical potential’ which should prevail in the sexual relationship, and his unorthodox (unreliable too) methods of contraception....There's a certain curiosity rather than scientific value here.”

In the foreword to his book, von Urban stated that his “entirely new conception of the mechanism of sexual intercourse” was based on his experience in Damascus, Syria, in 1916, with a former patient of his who had just married “a beautiful, young Arabian girl” and who, at von Urban’s suggestion, conducted a series of sexual “experiments” together. “After further study and reflection,” wrote von Urban, “I formulated a set of conclusions in my six rules for human sex relations which have been applied satisfactorily by scores of European and American couples.”

=== Other books ===
Urbantschitsch also published plays and novels under the name Georg Gorgone. His autobiography, Myself Not Least: A Confessional Autobiography of a Psychoanalyst and Some Explanatory History Cases, appeared in 1958.

== Personal life ==
With his first wife, Friederike "Fritzi" Rosali Persicaner, he had two children, Hans "Hansel" (1901–1925) and Greta "Gretel" (1903–1999). By his second wife, actress Maria Mayen, he had a daughter, Elizabeth. He was later married to Virginia Jacqueline MacDonald.

One of von Urban's nephews was the composer and conductor Victor Urbancic. Additionally, his grandson (through his daughter Elizabeth) is the actor Christoph Waltz.

Rudolf von Urban died in Carmel, California, aged 85.

== Works ==
- The inner secretion and its determining influence on our physical and mental life: Lecture given on May 20, 1921 in the Philosophical Society of the University of Vienna. Heller, Vienna / Leipzig 1922.
- Psychoanalysis: its significance and its influence on the education of young people, child education, career and love choice. Lecturer Using examples from life. Perles, Vienna 1924 (revised 1928 in English translation as Psycho-Analysis for All, published by Daniel in London).
- Modern child rearing based on psychoanalytic experiences. Perles, Vienna 1925.
- Self-knowledge with the help of psychoanalysis: presented using cases from psychoanalytic practice. January 14, 1926. Perles, Vienna 1926.
- Georg Gorgone: Julia. Novel of a passion. Rikola, Vienna 1926.
- The problem of the soul in psychoanalytic lighting. Perles, Vienna 1926.
- Paths to joie de vivre: Old wisdom from a new perspective. Perles, Vienna 1927.
- Foreword to: Kurt Sonnenfeld: The red veil. Salzer, Vienna 1927.
- The trial marriage: from practice - for practice. Phaidon, Vienna 1929.
- Practical life science: From space to self. Amalthea, Vienna 1930.
- Rudolf von Urban: Myself not least. A confessional autobiography of a psychoanalyst and some explanatory history cases. Jarrolds, London 1958.
- Rudolf Urban von Urbantschitsch: Sexual Education from Childhood to Marriage: New Paths to a Perfect Sexual Life and a Happy Marriage. Czerny, Vienna 1951 ( Sex Perfection and Marital Happiness. Dial Press, New York 1949)
- Rudolf von Urban: The unconscious life. Amandus, Vienna 1963
- Beyond human knowledge: A consideration of the unexplained in man and nature. Rider, London 1958).
- Jaap Bos, Leendert Groenendijk, Johan Sturm and Paul Roazen: The Self-Marginalization of Wilhelm Stekel. Freudian Circles Inside and Out. Springer, New York 2007, ISBN 978-0-387-32699-3 .
- Elke Mühlleitner: Urbantschitsch (Urban), Rudolf von (1879–1964). In: International Dictionary of Psychoanalysis.
- Elke Mühlleitner: Biographical Lexicon of Psychoanalysis: The Members of the Psychological Wednesday Society and the Vienna Psychoanalytical Association 1902–1938. Diskord, Tübingen 1992, p. 348 ff.
- Johannes Reichmayr : Rudolf von Urbantschitsch (Rudolf von Urban), 1879–1964. In: Revue internationale d'histoire de la psychanalyse. 4: 647-658 (1991).
- Urbantschitsch, Rudolf von. In: German Biographical Encyclopedia. 2nd edition. Vol. 10 (2008), p. 201
