= Christoph Waltz filmography =

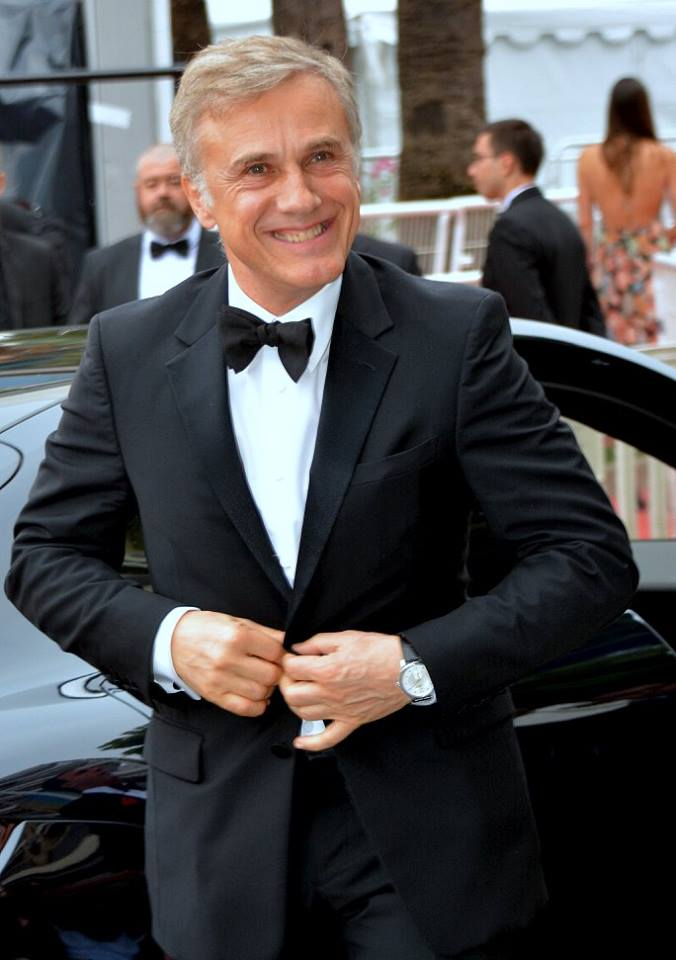
Waltz at the 2018 Cannes Film Festival

Christoph Waltz is an Austrian and German actor.

== Filmography ==
=== Film ===
Year	Title	Role	Language	Director	Notes
1979	Breakthrough	Paramedic	English	Andrew V. McLaglen	Uncredited
1981	Headstand	Markus	German	Ernst Josef Lauscher	
1982	Fire and Sword	Tristan	English	Veith von Fürstenberg	
1986	Wahnfried	Friedrich Nietzsche	German	Peter Patzak	
1988	Quicker Than the Eye	Police Chief	English	Nicolas Gessner	
1991	Life for Life: Maximilian Kolbe	Jan Tytz	Polish	Krzysztof Zanussi	Credited as Christopher Waltz
1995	The Start of Something	Herbert	German	Nikolaus Leytner	
1997	Our God's Brother	Maksymilian Gierymski	English	Krzysztof Zanussi	
1998	Night Time	Police Inspector Becker	German	Peter Fratzscher	
1998	Love Scenes from Planet Earth	Charly	German	Marc Rothemund	
1999	The Bride	Karl August	German	Egon Günther	
2000	Ordinary Decent Criminal	Peter	English	Thaddeus O'Sullivan	
2000	Falling Rocks	Louis	German	Peter Keglevic	
2000	Death, Deceit and Destiny; Aboard the Orient Express	Ossama / Tarik	English	Mark Roper	
2001	Queen's Messenger	Ali Ben Samm	English	Mark Roper	
2001	She	Michael Vincey	English	Timothy Bond	
2003	Angst	Psychoanalyst	German	Oskar Roehler	
2003	Gun-Shy	Johannsen	German	Dito Tsintsadze	
2003	Berlin Blues	Doctor	German	Leander Haußmann	
2004	Pact with the Devil	Rolf Steiner	English	Allan A. Goldstein	
2006	Lapislazuli: In the Eyes of the Bear	Czerny	German	Wolfgang Murnberger	
2009	Inglourious Basterds	Colonel Hans "The Jew Hunter" Landa	English, German, French, Italian	Quentin Tarantino	
2011	The Green Hornet	Benjamin Chudnofsky / Bloodnofsky	English	Michel Gondry	
2011	Water for Elephants	August Rosenbluth	English	Francis Lawrence	
2011	The Three Musketeers	Cardinal Richelieu	English	Paul W. S. Anderson	
2011	Carnage	Alan Cowan	English	Roman Polanski	
2012	It Is No Dream	Theodor Herzl (voice)	English	Richard Trank	Documentary
2012	Django Unchained	Dr. King Schultz	English, German	Quentin Tarantino	
2013	Epic	Mandrake (voice)	English	Chris Wedge	
2013	The Zero Theorem	Qohen Leth	English	Terry Gilliam	Also co-producer
2014	Muppets Most Wanted	Himself	English	James Bobin	Cameo
2014	Horrible Bosses 2	Burt Hanson	English	Sean Anders	
2014	Big Eyes	Walter Keane	English	Tim Burton	
2015	Spectre	Franz Oberhauser / Ernst Stavro Blofeld	English	Sam Mendes	
2016	The Legend of Tarzan	Léon Rom	English	David Yates	
2017	Tulip Fever	Cornelis Sandvoort	English	Justin Chadwick	
2017	Downsizing	Dusan Mirkovic	English	Alexander Payne	
2019	Alita: Battle Angel	Dyson Ido	English	Robert Rodriguez	
2019	Georgetown	Ulrich Mott	English	Himself	Directorial debut
2019	QT8: The First Eight	Himself	English	Tara Wood	Documentary film
2020	Rifkin's Festival	Death	English	Woody Allen	
2021	The French Dispatch	Paul Duval	English	Wes Anderson	
2021	No Time to Die	Ernst Stavro Blofeld	English	Cary Joji Fukunaga	
2022	Dead for a Dollar	Max Borlund	English	Walter Hill	Also executive producer
2022	Pinocchio	Count Volpe (voice)	English	Guillermo del Toro and Mark Gustafson	
2023	The Portable Door	Humphrey Wells	English	Jeffrey Walker	
2024	Old Guy	Danny Dolinski	English	Simon West	
2025	Dracula	Priest	English	Luc Besson	
2025	Frankenstein	Heinrich Harlander	English	Guillermo del Toro	
2026	Minions & Monsters	Max (voice)	English	Pierre Coffin	

=== Television ===
Year	Title	Role	Language	Director	Notes
1977	Am dam des	Singer	German		
1977	Der Einstand	Gunther Vesley	German	Reinhard Schwabenitzky	Television film
1979	Feuer!	Karl Albrecht Schlick	German	Reinhard Schwabenitzky	Television film
1979	Parole Chicago	Eduard "Ede" Bredo	German	Reinhard Schwabenitzky	13 episodes
1982	The Mysterious Stranger	Ernst Wasserman	English	Peter H. Hunt	Television film
1982	Dr. Margarete Johnsohn	Rainer	German	Dagmar Damek	Television film
1983	The Sandman	Nathanael	German	Dagmar Damek	Television film
1985	Ein Fall für zwei	Alf	German	Bernd Fischerauer	Episode: "Blutsbande"
1986	Der Alte	Hans Baumeister	German	Günter Gräwert	Episode: "Zwei Leben"
1986	Derrick	Eberhard Bothe	German	Gero Erhardt	Episode: "Schonzeit für Mörder"
1986	The Lenz Papers	Franz Sigel	German	Dieter Berner	Television miniseries
1987	Tatort	Police Inspector Passini	German	Kurt Junek	Episode: "Wunschlos tot"
1987	Das andere Leben	Stefan	German	Nicolas Gessner	Television film
1988	The Alien Years	Stefan Mueller	English	Donald Crombie	Television series
1988	Derrick	Schumann	German	Helmut Ashley	Episode: "Mord inklusive"
1989	Goldeneye	German Spy	English	Don Boyd	Television film
1990	The Gravy Train	Dr. Hans-Joachim Dorfmann	English	David Tucker	4 episodes
1990	The Old Fox	Christian Kamp	German	Alfred Weidenmann	Episode: "So gut wie tot"
1991	The Gravy Train Goes East	Dr. Hans-Joachim Dorfmann	English	James Cellan Jones	4 episodes
1991	Napoleon	Karl Emmanuel	French		2 episodes
1992	5 Rooms, Kitchen, Bathroom	Hartwig Klemmnitz	German	Rolf Silber	Television film
1992	Die Angst wird bleiben	Manfred	German	Diethard Klante	Television film
1993	A King for Burning	John of Leiden	German	Tom Toelle	Television film
1994	Judgment Day	Erwin Mikolajczyk	German	Peter Keglevic	Television film
1994	Man in Search of Woman	Christoph	German	Vivian Naefe	Television film
1994	Jacob	Morash	English	Peter Hall	Television film
1995	The Public Prosecutor	Andreas Döpke	German	Thomas Jacob	Television miniseries
1995	The All New Alexei Sayle Show	"Weak Moustache"	English	Metin Hüseyin	Episode #2.3
1995	Prinz zu entsorgen	Roman	German	Dietmar Klein	Television film
1995	Catherine the Great	Mirovich	English	Marvin J. Chomsky	Television film
1996	The Tourist	Stephan Görner	German	Urs Egger	Television film
1996	You Are Not Alone: The Roy Black Story	Roy Black	German	Peter Keglevic	Television film
1996	Rosa Roth	Wietze	German	Carlo Rola	Episode: "Nirgendwohin"
1996	Rex: A Cop's Best Friend	Martin Wolf	German	Oliver Hirschbiegel	Episode: "Der Puppenmörder"
1997	Maître Da Costa	Walter Mueller	French	Bob Swaim and Nicolas Ribowski	2 episodes
1997	Faust	Gerhardt Schulze-Leitner	German	Martin Enlen	Episode: "Villa Palermo"
1997	Schimanski	Klaus Mandel	German	Hajo Gies	Episode: "Blutsbrüder"
1998	Vicky's Nightmare	Johnny	German	Peter Keglevic	Television film
1998	Schock – Eine Frau in Angst	Kommissar Kaul	German	Ben Verbong	Television film
1998	The Final Game	Kant	German	Sigi Rothemund	Television film
1998	Rache für mein totes Kind	Paul	German	Vivian Naefe	Television film
1998	Murderous Legacy	Moritz Fink	German	Peter Patzak	Television film
1999	Dessine-moi un jouet	Klaus Hermann	French	Hervé Baslé	Television film
2000	The Beast	Herbert Fink	German	Carl-Friedrich Koschnick, Gerd Roman Frosch and Oliver Berben	also known as Das Teufelsweib; Television film
2001	Engel sucht Flügel	Caspari	German	Marek Gierszał	Television film
2001	Rieke's Love	Pair Skating Coach Peter Karlhoff	German	Kilian Riedhof	Television film
2001	Dance with the Devil	Dieter Cilov	German	Peter Keglevic	Television film
2002	One Hell of a Night	Klaus-Dieter Lehmann	German	Stephan Wagner	Television film
2002	Weihnachtsmann gesucht	Johannes Böhmke	German	Uwe Janson	Television film
2003	Instinct for Crime	Brisky	German	Uwe Janson	Television film
2003	Der Mörder ist unter uns	Martin Bach	German	Markus Imboden	also known as Der Fall Gehring; Television film
2003	Two Days of Hope	Michael Berg	German	Peter Keglevic	Television film
2003	Jennerwein	Pföderl	German	Hans-Günther Bücking	Television film
2003	Tiger Eyes See Better	Dr. Thilo Rylow	German	Thomas Nennstiel	Television film
2004	Scheidungsopfer Mann	Benedikt von Arn	German	Stefan Krohmer	Television film
2004	Murderous Search	Richard Benedek	German	Johannes Grieser	Television film
2004	Schöne Witwen küssen besser	Jean-France	German	Carlo Rola	Television film
2005	Die Patriarchin	Wolf Sevening	German	Carlo Rola	Television miniseries
2005	Unsolved	Richard Seemann	German	Peter Keglevic	Episode: "Verlorene Jahre"
2006	SOKO Rhein-Main	Andreas Senner	German	Michael Schneider	Episode: "Schuld und Sühne"
2006	Polizeiruf 110	Dr. Juris Gríns	German	Titus Selge	Episode: "Die Lettin und ihr Lover"
2006	Stolberg	Paul Büttner	German	Peter Keglevic	Episode: "Kreuzbube"
2006	Tatort	Professor Robert Henze	German	Uwe Janson	Episode: "Schlaflos in Weimar"
2006	Franziska Luginsland	Karl Löwen	German	Nina Grosse	Episode: "Franziskas Gespür für Männer"
2007	Der Staatsanwalt	Dr. Claudius Tressen	German	Peter F. Bringmann	Episode: "Glückskinder"
2007	Der letzte Zeuge	Dr. Martin York	German	Bernhard Stephan	Episode: "Martinspassion"
2007	Unter Verdacht	Thomas Sell	German	Ed Herzog	Episode: "Hase and Igel"
2007	The Zürich Engagement	Frank "Büffel" Arbogast	German	Stephan Meyer	Television film
2007	Die Verzauberung	Dr. Helmut Bahr	German	Wolfram Paulus	Television film
2008	Das Geheimnis im Wald	Hans Kortmann	German	Peter Keglevic	Television film
2008	Polonius Fischer	Sebastian Flies	German	Matti Geschonneck	Episode: "Todsünde"
2008	Ten: Umbra Mortis	Peters	German	Urs Egger	Television film
2008	Die Anwälte	Herbert Jahn	German	Miguel Alexandre	Episode: "Leben und Tod"
2008	Tatort	Gerd Weißenbach	German	Tobias Ineichen	Episode: "Liebeswirren"
2013	Saturday Night Live	Host	English	Don Roy King	Episode: "Christoph Waltz/Alabama Shakes"
2017	Comedians in Cars Getting Coffee	Guest	English		Episode: "Champagne, Cigars and Pancake Batter"
2020–2023	Most Dangerous Game	Miles Sellars	English	Phil Abraham, Sam Hill	27 episodes
2023	The Consultant	Regus Patoff	English	Various	8 episodes
2025	Only Murders in the Building	Sebastian "Bash" Steed	English	Various	Recurring guest role

=== As director ===
Year	Title	Notes
2000	Wenn man sich traut	
2019	Georgetown	
