= Iva Mihanović =

German opera singer

- Born: Iva Mihanović; April 19, 1978 (age 47); Ulm, Germany
- Spouse: Maximilian Schell (m. 2013; died 2014)

Iva Mihanović (born 19 April 1978), also known as Iva Schell, is a German operatic soprano and concert singer. She is the widow of Swiss actor Maximilian Schell.

== Life ==
Iva Mihanović lives in Preitenegg, Austria and Ulm. In August 2013, she married Maximilian Schell (48 years her senior) with whom she was romantically involved since 2008 and who died February 1, 2014, in Innsbruck.

Iva Mihanović is patron of Education World Maximilian Schell in Wolfsberg, as well as the HistiozytoseHilfe eV.

From 1998 to 2008, she studied singing with Edith Wiens at the Musikhochschule Augsburg and Ilse Hahn at the University of Music Carl Maria von Weber Dresden. Iva attended master classes with Brigitte Fassbaender, Edith Mathis, Sena Jurinac, Irmgard Boas and Linda Plech.

From 2001 to 2006, Iva Mihanović was a member of the Theater Ulm where she sang many opera, operetta, and musical roles from 2009 until 2011, and again since the season 2015/2016 the ensemble of the Leipzig Opera / Musical comedy. Since 2006, she has performed these roles at the following theaters:

- 2006–2007: Theater St. Gallen (CH), as Pepi Pleininger (Wiener Blut)
- 2006–2007: Theater Augsburg, as Valencienne (The Merry Widow)
- 2007–2013: Hessian State Theatre in Wiesbaden, as Ottilie (The White Horse Inn) and Christl (Der Vogelhändler)
- 2007–2008: Theater Ulm, as Annie (Der Freischütz) and Christl (Der Vogelhändler)
- 2008: Operetta Club Balzers (FL), as Juliska (Mask in Blue)
- 2009: Luzerner Theater (Switzerland), as Christl (Der Vogelhändler)
- 2009: Stadttheater Baden near Vienna (AT), as Dolly Marbanks (The Orlov)
- 2012: Landestheater Coburg, as Ciboletta (A Night in Venice)
- 2012: Gärtnerplatz Theatre Munich, (The White Horse Inn)

She performed at the following festivals:

- Operetta Festival Bad Ischl (AT) – in 2003 as Juliette Vermont (Count of Luxembourg), 2004 as Ciboletta (A Night in Venice), and 2013 as Minnie Fay (Hello, Dolly!)
- International Music Festival "Classionata" Mümliswil (CH) – in 2005 as Adele (Fledermaus)
- Castle Festival Schönbrunn Wien (AT) – in 2005/06 as Pepi Pleininger (Wiener Blut)
- Mörbisch Lake Festival (AT) – in 2007 as Pepi Pleininger (Wiener Blut), directed by Maximilian Schell
- Schlossfestspiele Langenlois (AT) – in 2008 as Countess Stasi (Csárdásfürstin) and 2010 as Ciboletta (A Night in Venice)
- Mörbisch Lake Festival (AT) – in 2011 as Arsena (The Gypsy Baron), directed by Brigitte Fassbaender
- Richard Wagner Festival Wels (AT) – in 2012 as flower girl (Parsifal)
- Richard Wagner Festival Wels (AT) – in 2013 and 2015 as Young Shepherd (Tannhäuser)
- Freilichtspiele Altusried (DE) – in 2014 as Ottilie (The White Horse Inn)
- Stage Baden (AT) – in 2015 as Friederike (The Jolly Farmer)

== Prizes and awards ==
- 2000: Promotion and Artist grant from the city of Ulm
- 2002: Bayreuth scholarship of the Richard Wagner Society International eV
- 2002: Winner of the "International Singing Competition Festival City Passau"
- 2005: Finalist in the "3. Heinrich Strecker operetta competition "for operetta and Wienerlied Baden bei Wien
- 2008: Semi-finalist in the Hans-Gabor-Belvedere Competition (category operetta) in Vienna
- 2009: Finalist at the 24th Int. Robert Stolz Competition for Viennese operetta in Hamburg

== Discography ==
- Die Perlen der Cleopatra, operetta by Oscar Straus, 2003 Cat: 5819263 (CPO)
- Athalia, oratorio by George Frideric Handel in 2004, production commissioned by the Theater Ulm
- The Gypsy Baron, operetta by Johann Strauss II, 2011 DVD production of the Mörbisch Lake Festival
