= Victor Urbancic =

Austrian composer

Dr. Victor Urbancic, Austrian composer in Iceland. Photograph by Jón Kaldal.

Dr. Victor Urbancic or Viktor Ernest Johann von Urbantschitsch (9 August 1903 – 4 April 1958) was an Austrian composer, conductor, teacher and music scholar from Vienna. During his twenty-year exile in Iceland, from 1938 until his death, he made significant contributions to Iceland's musical culture.

== Biography ==
Urbancic was born in Vienna and began his musical studies there, studying piano, and later composition with Joseph Marx and conducting with Clemens Krauss and others at the Vienna Conservatory of Music. He also completed a doctorate in musicology at the University of Vienna under Guido Adler, with a dissertation on sonata form in the works of Johannes Brahms.

His early career was spent at the Stadttheater Mainz, and he had already obtained a position at the Conservatory there, which was led by his old friend and colleague Hans Gál, when the Nazis took power in 1933 and he was forced to leave Germany. Although Urbancic was born and raised in the Catholic faith, his wife, Melitta, came from a Jewish family. He eventually found a new job at the Graz Conservatory, where he was teacher and director of the opera studio, as well as lecturing in musicology at the University of Graz. With the annexation of Austria by the Nazis in 1938, Urbancic again had to flee, as divorcing his wife was never an option for him. Along with Melitta and their three young children, he emigrated to Iceland in 1938. Urbancic stayed for the second half of his life in Iceland and had a major influence on the music development in the country at the time.

In Iceland, Urbancic was the chief conductor of the Reykjavík Orchestra (which in 1950 became the Iceland Symphony Orchestra), the Reykjavík Music Society Chorus, as well as teaching piano, music history, theory, and counterpoint at the Reykjavík School of Music. With the Reykjavík Music Society Choir, he conducted the first performances in Iceland of J.S. Bach's St John Passion and Christmas Oratorio, Mozart's Requiem, and many other significant works. In 1951, he became music director of the Icelandic National Theater in Reykjavík. He conducted the first opera in Iceland which was Rigoletto by Giuseppe Verdi in 1951. Urbancic was also organist and choir director of the Landakotskirkja in Reykjavík. Urbancic died on Good Friday in 1958 in Reykjavík.

He is the grandson of Viktor Urbantschitsch through his father, Dr. Ernst Urbantschitsch, the nephew of Rudolf Urbantschitsch (Rudolf von Urban) and related to Christoph Waltz through the latter's mother Elisabeth Urbancic.

A recent book by Icelandic musicologist Árni Heimir Ingólfsson, Music at World’s End: Three Exiled Musicians from Nazi Germany and Austria and Their Contribution to Music in Iceland, discusses Urbancic’s life and career in detail.

== Selected works ==
- Caprices mignons for piano, Op. 1
- Sonatina in G major for piano, Op. 2
- Sonata No. 1 in F♯ minor for violin and piano, Op. 3
- Sonata No. 2 for violin and piano, Op. 5
- Vier Lieder (4 Songs), Op. 6
- Partita for cello and piano, Op. 7
- Elizabeth for voice and piano, Op. 8
- Fantasie und Fuge for viola and piano, Op. 9 (1937)
- Orchesterkonzert (Concerto for Orchestra), Op. 11
- Fimm þættir (5 Movements) for 2 trumpets, horn, 2 trombones and piano, Op. 12
- Concertino for 3 saxophones and string orchestra, Op. 13
- Ballade for violin and piano
- Gamanforleikur (Festive Prelude) in C major for orchestra
- Konzertrondo (Concert Rondo) for 2 pianos
- Mouvement de valse for piano
- Ouvertüre zu einer Komödie (Overture to a Comedy) for orchestra (1952)
- Sonata in G major for cello and piano

== Selected recordings ==
- Caprices mignons über ein Kinderlied, op. 1. Susanne Kessel, piano. Iceland: Piano Music by Icelandic Composers. Oehms Classics 2007.
- Sonatina in G major, op. 2. Marcel Worms, piano. Piano Works by Jewish Composers, 1922–1943. Zefir Records, 2020.
- Vorahnung. Lieder. Marina Kolda, Julia Tinhof. Gramola 2023.
