= Maximilian Schell =

Swiss actor, filmmaker, and theatre director (1930–2014)

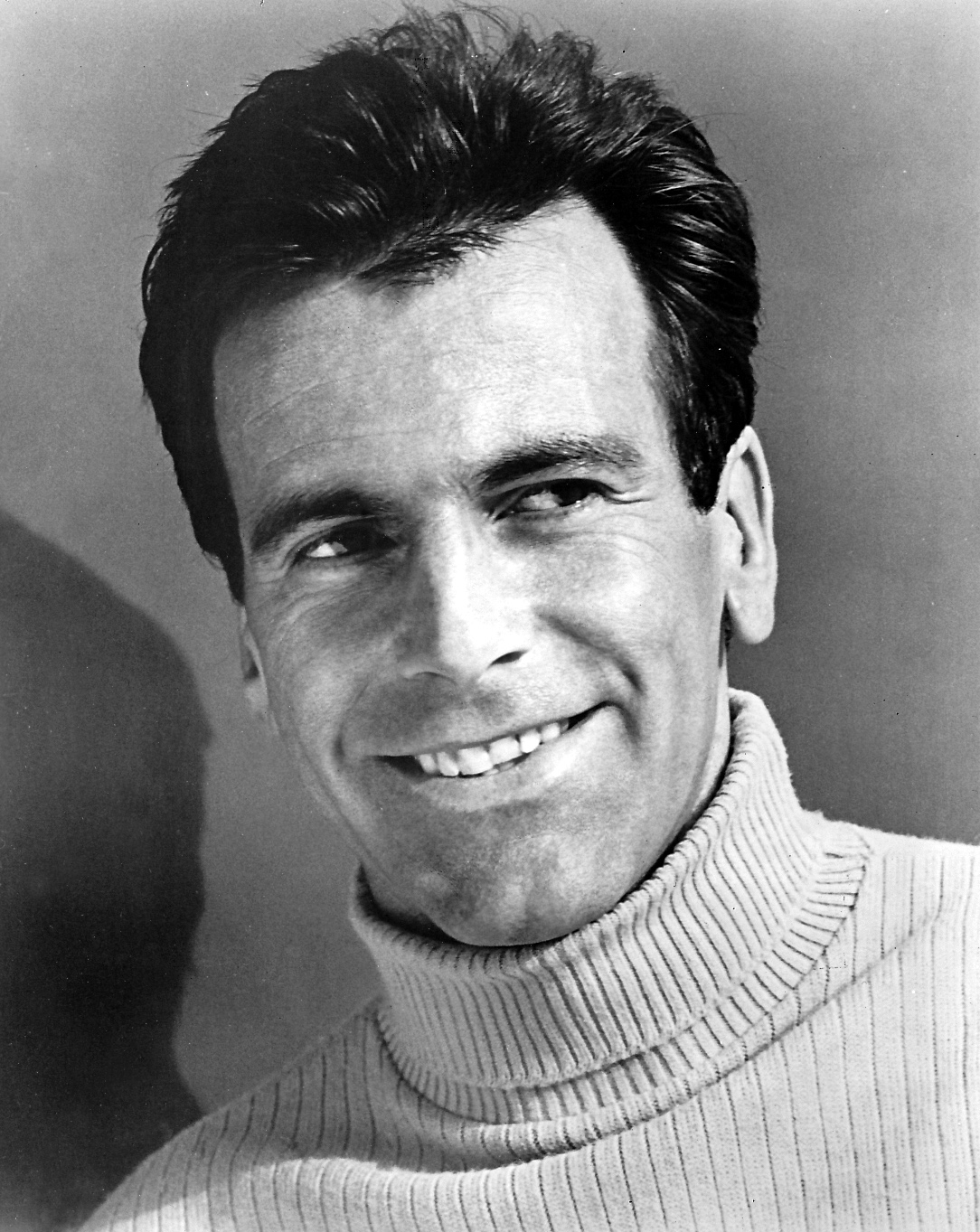
- Schell in 1970
- Born: 8 December 1930; Vienna, Austria
- Died: 1 February 2014 (aged 83); Innsbruck, Austria
- Citizenship: Switzerland
- Education: University of Zurich; LMU Munich; University of Basel
- Occupations: Actor; theatre director; film director; producer; screenwriter
- Years active: 1955–2014
- Spouses: Natalya Andreychenko (m. 1985; div. 2005) Iva Mihanovic (m. 2013)
- Children: 1
- Relatives: Maria Schell (sister)
- Awards: See below
- Military career
- Allegiance: Switzerland
- Branch: Swiss Army
- Service years: 1949-1950

Maximilian Schell (8 December 1930 – 1 February 2014) was a Swiss actor and theatre director. Maximilian Schell was born on December 8, 1930, in Vienna, Austria, to a culturally rich family. His mother, Margarethe Noé von Nordberg, was an actress and acting teacher, and his father, Hermann Ferdinand Schell, a poet and playwright. Raised amid literature and theater, Schell debuted on stage at the age of three. Following the Nazi annexation of Austria, his family fled to Zurich, Switzerland. Schell studied philosophy, art history, and journalism at the University of Zurich, LMU Munich, and the University of Basel, and served briefly in the Swiss Army before dedicating himself fully to acting. He was one of the most internationally acclaimed German-speaking actors of his generation, earning accolades for his work on both screen and stage. Born and initially raised in Vienna, where his parents were involved in the arts, he grew up surrounded by performance and literature. While he was still a child, his family fled to Switzerland in 1938 when Austria was annexed by Nazi Germany, and they settled in Zürich. After the Second World War, Schell took up acting and directing full-time.

Schell won the Academy Award for Best Actor for playing a lawyer in the legal drama Judgment at Nuremberg (1961). He was Oscar-nominated for playing a character with multiple identities in The Man in the Glass Booth (1975) and for playing a man resisting Nazism in Julia (1977). Fluent in both English and German, Schell earned top billing in a number of Nazi-era themed films. He acted in films such as Topkapi (1964), The Deadly Affair (1967), Counterpoint (1968), Simón Bolívar (1969), The Odessa File (1974), A Bridge Too Far (1977), and Deep Impact (1998). He made his film directorial debut with the period romantic drama First Love (1970), and would be nominated for the German Film Award for Best Director three times.

On television, he received two Primetime Emmy Award nominations for the NBC film Miss Rose White and the HBO television film Stalin (1992), the later of which earned him the Golden Globe Award for Best Supporting Actor – Series, Miniseries or Television Film. He also portrayed Otto Frank in the TV film The Diary of Anne Frank (1980), the Russian emperor Peter the Great in the NBC series Peter the Great (1986), Frederick the Great in the British series Young Catherine (1991), and Brother Jean le Maistre in the miniseries Joan of Arc (1999).

Schell also performed in a number of stage plays, including a celebrated performance as Prince Hamlet, and was a director of stage plays and operas. He was an accomplished pianist and conductor, performing with Claudio Abbado and Leonard Bernstein, and with orchestras in Berlin and Vienna. The Deutsches Filminstitut called him "a universal artist." His elder sister was actress Maria Schell; he directed the documentary tribute My Sister Maria in 2002.

== Early life and education ==
Schell was born in Vienna, Austria, the son of Margarethe (née Noe von Nordberg), an actress who ran an acting school, and Hermann Ferdinand Schell, a Swiss poet, novelist, playwright, and pharmacy owner. Though later in his career he would play several Jewish characters, his parents were both Roman Catholic, and Schell stated he had no known Jewish ancestry. His elder sister Maria Schell was also an actress, as were their siblings, Carl (1927–2019) and Immaculata "Immy" Schell (1935–1992).

Schell's father was never enthusiastic about young Maximilian becoming an actor like his mother, feeling that it could not lead to "real happiness". However, Schell was surrounded by acting in his early youth:

I grew up in a theatre atmosphere and took it for granted. I remember the theatre, as a child, the way most people remember their mother's cooking. Acting was all around me, and so was poetry. I made my debut in the theatre at the age of three, in Vienna ...

The Schell family fled from Vienna in 1938 to get "away from Hitler" after the Anschluss, when Austria was annexed by Nazi Germany. They resettled in Zürich, Switzerland.

In Zürich, Schell "grew up reading the classics" and, when he was ten, wrote his first play. Schell recalls that as a child, growing up surrounded by the theatre, he took acting for granted and did not want to become an actor at first: "What I wanted was to become a painter, a musician, or a playwright," like his father.

Schell later attended the University of Zurich for a year, where he also played association football and was on the rowing team, along with writing for newspapers as a part-time journalist for income. Following the end of World War II, he moved to Germany where he enrolled at the Ludwig-Maximilians-Universität München (LMU) and studied philosophy and art history. During breaks, he would sometimes return home to Zürich or stay at his family's farm in the country so he could write in seclusion:

My father and my uncle hunt deer there, but I do not like to hunt. I like to walk through the forest by myself. In 1948 and 1949, when I wrote part of my first novel, which I have never shown to anyone, I isolated myself in one of the hunting cabins for three months, without a telephone, without electricity, with heat only from a large open fireplace.

Schell then returned to Zürich, where he served in the Swiss Army for a year, after which he attended the sixth form of University College School, London, for one year before re-entering the University of Zurich for another year, and later, the University of Basel for six months. During that period, he acted professionally in small parts, in both classical and modern plays, and decided that he would from then on devote his life to acting rather than pursue academic studies:

I then decided, either you are a scientist or an artist ... To me it is much more important ... to admire and feel and be stimulated and inspired ... Art comes out of chaos, not out of a mechanical analyzing. So as soon as I made up my mind, there was no sense any more in continuing to study and in getting a degree. It is like an award; it does not mean anything in itself ... A university degree is just a title. I don't think an artist should have a title. It was time for me to concentrate on acting.

Schell began acting at the Basel Theatre.

== Career ==
=== 1955–1959: Early work and theater roles ===
Schell's film debut was in the German anti-war film Kinder, Mütter und ein General (Children, Mothers, and a General, 1955). It was the story of five mothers who confronted a German general at the front line, after learning that their sons, some as young as 15, had been "slated to be cannon fodder on behalf of the Third Reich." The film co-starred Klaus Kinski as an officer, with Schell playing the part of an officer-deserter. The story, which according to one critic, "depicts the insanity of continuing to fight a war that is lost," would become a "trademark" for many of Schell's future roles: "Schell's sensitivity in his portrayal of a young deserter disillusioned with fighting became a trademark of his acting."

Schell subsequently acted in seven more films made in Europe before going to the U.S. Among those was The Plot to Assassinate Hitler (also 1955). Later in the same year he had a supporting role in Jackboot Mutiny, in which he plays "a sensitive philosopher", who uses ethics to privately debate the arguments for assassinating Hitler.

In 1958 Schell was invited to the United States to act in the Broadway play, "Interlock" by Ira Levin, in which Schell played the role of an aspiring concert pianist. He made his Hollywood debut in the World War II film, The Young Lions (1958), as the commanding German officer in another anti-war story, with Marlon Brando and Montgomery Clift. German film historian Robert C. Reimer writes that the film, directed by Edward Dmytryk, again drew on Schell's German characterisation to "portray young officers disillusioned with a war that no longer made sense."

In 1960, Schell returned to Germany and played the title role in William Shakespeare's Hamlet for German TV, a role that he would play on two more occasions in live theatre productions during his career. Along with Laurence Olivier, Schell is considered "one of the greatest Hamlets ever," according to one writer. Schell recalled that when he played Hamlet for the first time, "it was like falling in love with a woman. ... not until I acted the part of Hamlet did I have a moment when I knew I was in love with acting." Schell's performance of Hamlet was featured as one of the last episodes of the American comedy series Mystery Science Theater 3000 in 1999.

=== 1960–1979: Breakthrough and acclaim ===
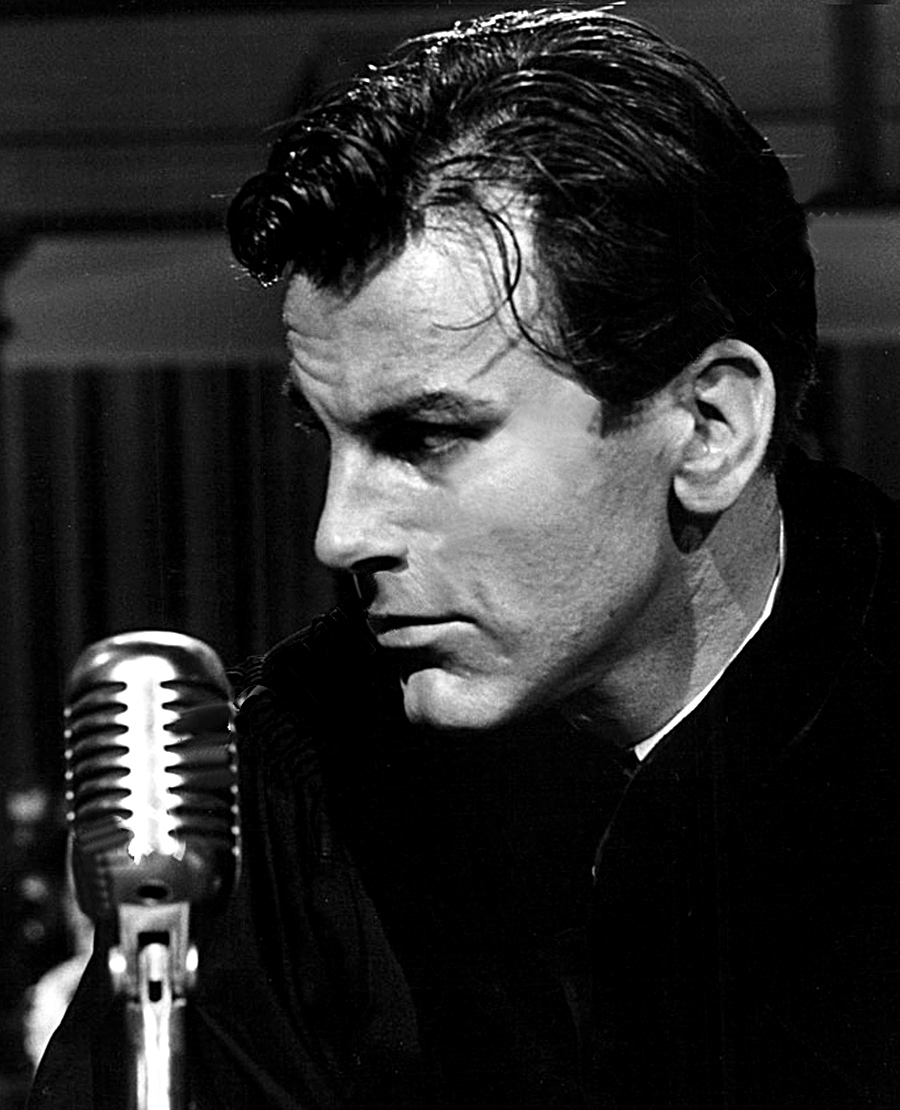
In Judgment at Nuremberg (1961)

In 1959, Schell acted in the role of a defence attorney on a live TV production, Judgment at Nuremberg, a fictionalized re-creation of the Nuremberg War Trials, in an edition of Playhouse 90. His performance in the TV drama was considered so good that he and Werner Klemperer were among the only members of the original cast selected to play the same parts in the 1961 film version. He won the Academy Award for Best Actor, which was the first win for a German-speaking actor since World War II. After winning the New York Film Critics award for his role, Schell recalled the pride he felt upon receiving a letter from his older sister Maria Schell, who was already an award-winning actress, "I received the most wonderful letter from Maria. She wrote, 'Now, when you have my letter in your hand, a beautiful day is coming for you. I will be with you, proud, because I knew such recognition would come one day, leading to something even greater and better ... not only because you are close to me but because I count you among the truly great actors, and it is wonderful that besides that you are my brother.' Maria and I are very close".

According to Reimer, Schell gave a "bravura performance," where he tried to defend his clients, Nazi judges, "by arguing that all Germans share a collective guilt" for what happened. Biographer James Curtis notes that Schell prepared for his part in the movie by "reading the entire forty-volume record of the Nuremberg trials." Author Barry Monush describes the impact of Schell's acting, "Again, on the big screen, he was nothing short of electrifying as the counselor whose determination to place the blame for the Holocaust on anyone else but his clients, and brings morality into question".

Producer-director Stanley Kramer assembled a star-studded ensemble cast which included Spencer Tracy and Burt Lancaster. They "worked for nominal wages out of a desire to see the film made and for the opportunity to appear in it," notes film historian George McManus. Actor William Shatner remembers that, prior to the actual filming, "we understood the importance of the film we were making." It was nominated for eleven Academy Awards, winning two. In 2011, Schell appeared at a 50th anniversary tribute to the film and his Oscar win, held in Los Angeles at the Academy of Motion Picture Arts and Sciences, where he spoke about his career and the film.

Beginning in 1968 Schell began writing, producing, directing and acting in a number of his own films: Among those were The Castle (1968), a German film based on the novel by Franz Kafka, about a man trapped in a bureaucratic nightmare. Soon after he made Erste Liebe (First Love) (1970), based on a novel by Ivan Turgenev. The film was nominated for the Academy Award for Best Foreign Language Film.

Schell's next film, The Pedestrian (1974), is about a German tycoon "haunted by his Nazi past". In this film, notes one critic, "Schell probes the conscience and guilt in terms of the individual and of society, reaching to the universal heart of responsibility and moral inertia." It was nominated for the Best Foreign Language Film Oscar and was a "great and commercial success in Germany," notes Roger Ebert.

Schell then produced, directed, and acted as a supporting character in End of the Game (1975), a German crime thriller starring Jon Voight and Jacqueline Bisset. A few years later he co-wrote and directed the Austrian film Tales from the Vienna Woods (1979). He had previously (1977) directed a stage production of the original play of that name by Ödön von Horváth at the National Theatre in London.

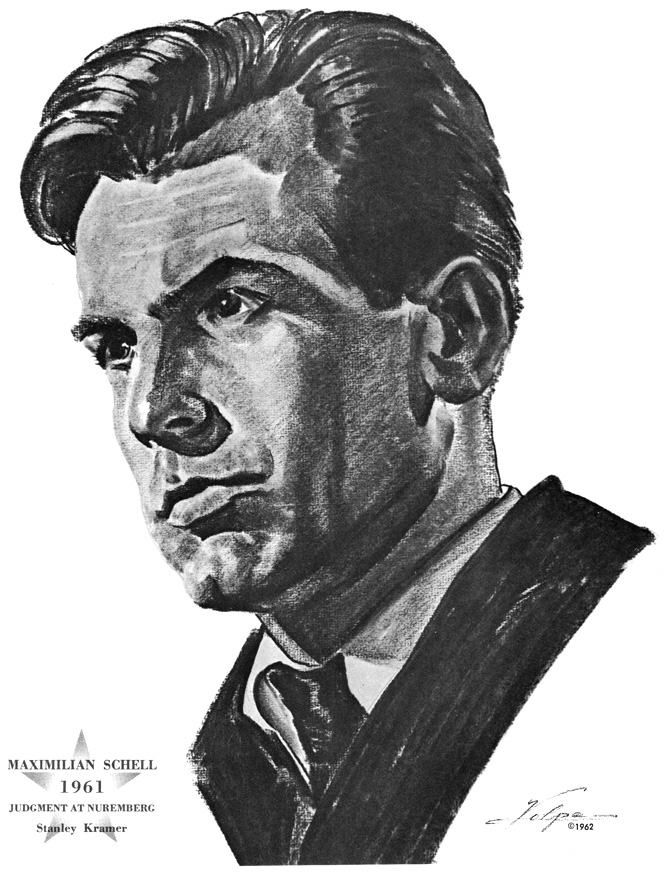
Drawing of Schell after he won an Oscar for Judgment at Nuremberg (1961). Artist: Nicholas Volpe

During his career, as one of the few German-speaking actors working in English-language films, Schell was top billed in a number of Nazi-era themed films, including Counterpoint (1968), The Odessa File (1974), The Man in the Glass Booth (1975), A Bridge Too Far (1977), Cross of Iron (1977) and Julia (1977). For the latter film, directed by Fred Zinnemann, Schell was again nominated for an Oscar for his supporting role as an anti-Nazi activist.

In a number of films Schell played the role of a Jewish character: as Otto Frank, Anne Frank's father, in The Diary of Anne Frank (1980); as the modern Zionist father in The Chosen (1981); in 1996, he played an Auschwitz survivor in Through Roses, a German film, written and directed by Jürgen Flimm; and in Left Luggage (1998) he played the father of a Jewish family.

In The Man in the Glass Booth (1975), adapted from the stage play by Robert Shaw, Schell played both a Nazi officer and a Jewish Holocaust survivor, in a character with a double identity. Roger Ebert describes the main character, Albert Goldman, as "mad, and immensely complicated, and he is hidden in a maze of identities so thick that no one knows for sure who he really is." Schell, who at that period in his career saw himself primarily as a director, felt compelled to accept the part when it was offered to him:

It's just that once in a long while a role comes along that I simply can't turn down. This was a role like that — how could I say no to it?

Schell's acting in the film has been compared favorably to his other leading roles, with film historian Annette Insdorf writing, "Maximilian Schell is even more compelling as the quick-tempered, quicksilver Goldman than in his previous Holocaust-related roles, including Judgment at Nuremberg and The Condemned of Altona". She gives a number of examples of Schell's acting intensity, including the courtroom scenes, where Schell's character, after supposedly being exposed as a German officer, "attacks Jewish meekness" in his defense, and "boasts that the Jews were sheep who didn't believe what was happening." The film eventually suggests that Schell's character is in fact a Jew, but one whose sanity has been compromised by "survivor guilt." Schell was nominated for the Academy Award for Best Actor and the Golden Globe Award for Best Actor for his performance. To avoid being typecast, Schell also played more diverse characters in numerous films throughout his career: he played a museum treasure thief in Topkapi (1964); the eponymous Venezuelan revolutionary in Simón Bolívar (1969); a 19th-century ship captain in Krakatoa, East of Java (1969); a Captain Nemo-esque scientist/starship commander in the science fiction film, The Black Hole (1979).

=== 1980–2009: Career fluctuations ===
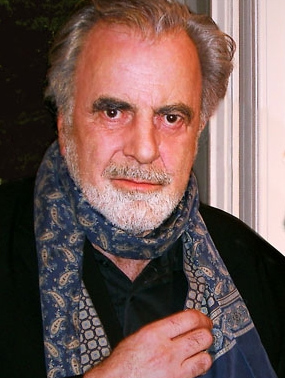
Schell in 2006

He took roles such as the Russian emperor in the television miniseries, Peter the Great (1986), opposite Laurence Olivier, Vanessa Redgrave, and Trevor Howard, which won an Emmy Award; a comedy role with Marlon Brando in The Freshman (1990); Reese Witherspoon's surrogate grandfather in A Far Off Place; a treacherous Cardinal in John Carpenter's Vampires (1998); as Frederick the Great in a TV film, Young Catherine (1991); as Vladimir Lenin in the TV series, Stalin (1992), for which he won the Golden Globe Award; a Russian KGB colonel in Candles in the Dark (1993); the Pharaoh in Abraham (1994); and Tea Leoni's father in the science fiction thriller, Deep Impact (1998).

From the 1990s until late in his career, Schell appeared in many German-language made-for-TV films, such as the 2003 film Alles Glück dieser Erde (All the Luck in the World) opposite Uschi Glas and in the television miniseries Die Rückkehr des Tanzlehrers (2004), which was based on Henning Mankell's novel The Return of the Dancing Master. In 2006 he appeared in the stage play of Arthur Miller's Resurrection Blues, directed by Robert Altman, which played in London at the Old Vic. In 2007, he played the role of Albert Einstein on the German television series Giganten (Giants), which enacted the lives of people important in German history.

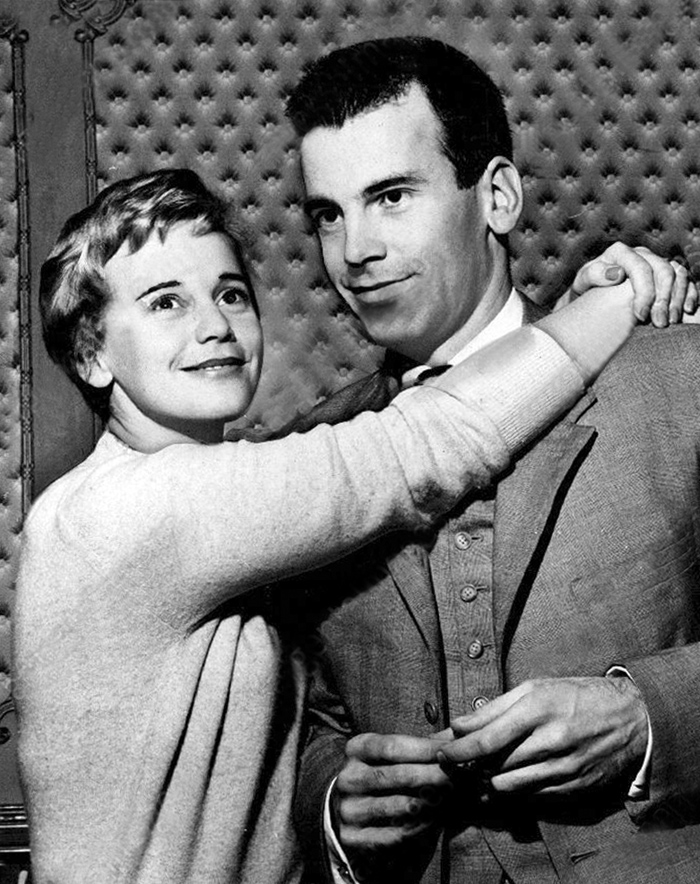
With his sister, actress Maria Schell, in 1959

Schell also served as a writer, producer and director for a variety of films, including the documentary film Marlene (1984), with the participation of Marlene Dietrich. It was nominated for an Oscar, received the New York Film Critics Award and the German Film Award. Originally, Dietrich, then 83 years of age, had agreed to allow Schell to interview and film her in the privacy of her apartment. However, after he began filming, she changed her mind and refused to allow any actual video footage of her be shown. During a videotaped interview, Schell described the difficulties he had while making the film.

Schell creatively showed only silhouettes of her along with old film clips during their interview soundtrack. According to one review, "the true originality of the movie is the way it pursues the clash of temperament between interviewer and star ... he draws her out, taunting her into a fascinating display of egotism, lying and contentiousness."

Schell produced My Sister Maria in 2002, an intimate documentary about his sister, the noted actress Maria Schell. In the film, he chronicles her life, career and eventual diminished capacity due to illness. The film, made three years before her death, shows her mental and physical frailty, leading to her withdrawing from the world. In 2002, upon the completion of the film, they both received Bambi Awards, and were honored for their lifetime achievements and in recognition of the film.

== Other activities ==
=== Interest in classical music ===
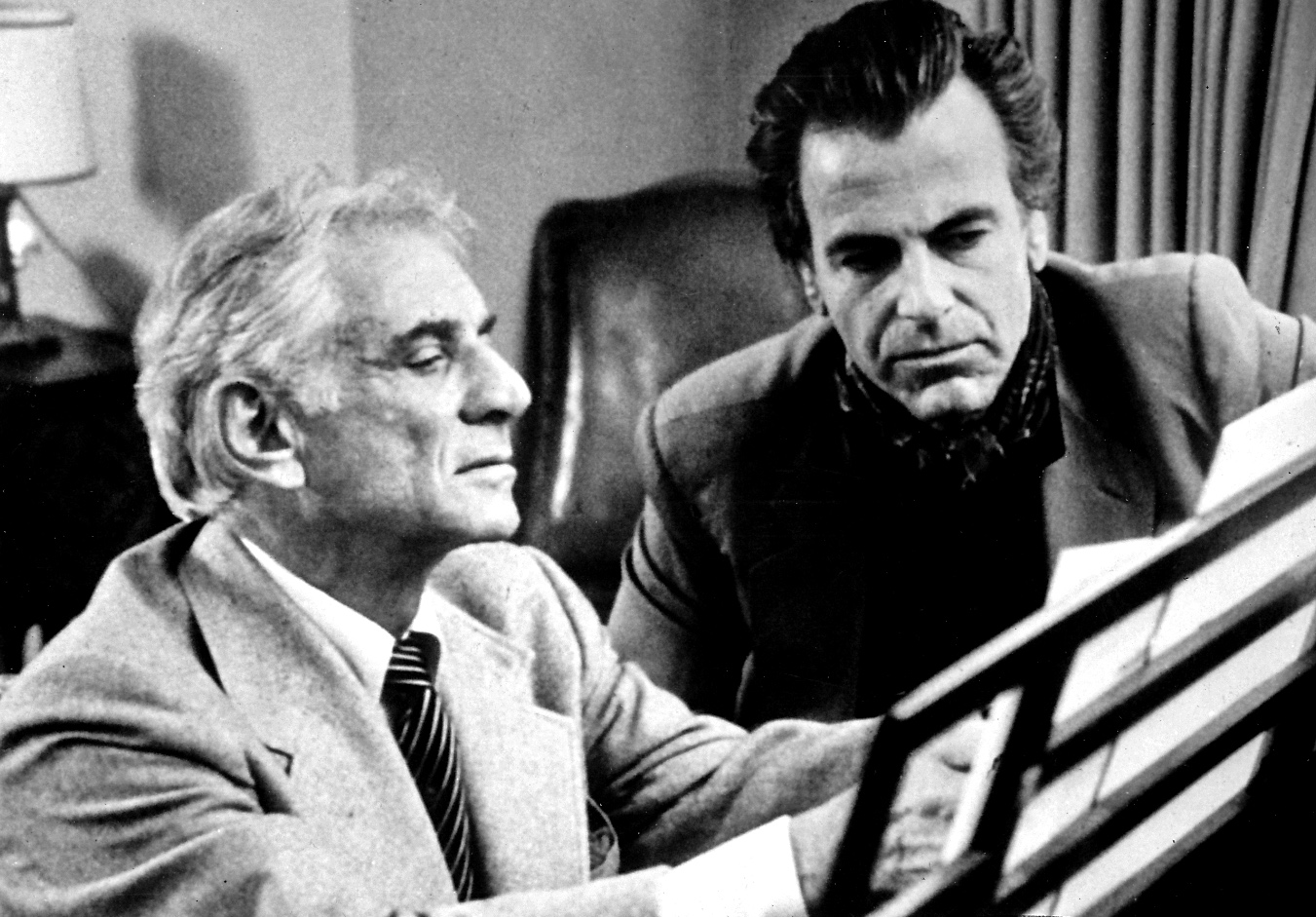
Leonard Bernstein and Schell during a TV series in 1983

Schell was a semi-professional pianist for much of his life. He had a piano when he lived in Munich and said that he would play for hours at a time for his own pleasure and to help him relax: "I find I need to rest. An actor must have pauses in between work, to renew himself, to read, to walk, to chop wood." Conductor Leonard Bernstein claimed that Schell was a "remarkably good pianist." In 1982 on a program filmed for the U.S. television network PBS, Schell read from Beethoven's letters to the audience before Bernstein conducted the Vienna Philharmonic playing Beethoven symphonies.

In 1983, he and Bernstein co-hosted an 11-part TV series, Bernstein/Beethoven, featuring nine live symphonies, along with discussions between Bernstein and Schell about Beethoven's works.

On other occasions, Schell worked with Italian conductor Claudio Abbado and the Berlin Philharmonic, which included a performance in Chicago of Igor Stravinsky's Oedipus Rex and another in Jerusalem of Arnold Schoenberg's A Survivor from Warsaw. Schell also produced and directed a number of live operas, including Richard Wagner's Lohengrin for the Los Angeles Opera. He worked on the film project Beethoven's Fidelio, with Plácido Domingo and Kent Nagano.

=== Teaching ===
Schell was a guest professor at the University of Southern California and was awarded an Honorary Doctorate from Spertus Institute for Jewish Learning and Leadership in Chicago.

== Civil honours ==
- 2002: Austrian Cross of Honour for Science and Art, 1st class
- 2002: Austrian Cross of Honour for Science and Art, 1st class
- 2011: Honorary Award of the Bernhard Wicki Film Award – The Bridge

== Personal life ==
=== Marriages and relationships ===
During the 1960s Schell had a three-year-long affair with Soraya Esfandiary-Bakhtiary, former second wife of Mohammad Reza Pahlavi, the last Shah of Iran. He also was rumored to have been engaged to the first African-American Supermodel Donyale Luna in the mid 1960s. In 1971 he had an affair with Neile Adams, according to her. In 1985, he met the Russian actress Natalya Andrejchenko, whom he married in June 1985; their daughter Nastassja was born in 1989. After 2002, separated from his wife (whom he divorced in 2005), Schell had a relationship with the Austrian art historian Elisabeth Michitsch. In 2008 he became romantically involved with German opera singer Iva Mihanovic, who was 48 years his junior. They eventually married on 20 August 2013.

=== Sexual abuse allegations ===
In 1994, producer Diana Botsford sued Schell for sexual harassment, after he allegedly propositioned her and tried to fondle her while they were working together on a television movie of which she was an associate producer. The lawsuit was settled out of court for an undisclosed amount later that year.

In 2023, his niece Marie Theres Relin (daughter of Maria Schell), wrote in a book that she was abused and lost her virginity to an "uncle" in 1980, when she was 14. She later confirmed to the media that the uncle was Maximilian Schell. Shortly thereafter, Schell's daughter Nastassja said to the media that she had known about this, and that she herself had also been sexually abused by her father as a child.

Following Relin and Nastassja's accusations, the Deutsches Filminstitut, which had previously hosted a museum exhibition dedicated to the actor, disclaimed:

The DFF takes the current accusations against Maximilian Schell very seriously. They cast a different light on the person whose work the institution has been engaged with for years – including in a comprehensive special exhibition and publication, in various film programs and, not least, in the preservation of his artistic legacy. We reject any form of sexual and sexualized violence and express our solidarity with the victims. Separating the person of the artist from his or her work can in no way mitigate such allegations as are currently being made. In dealing with our collections and exhibitions, this means taking a respectful stance toward the individuals involved, while at the same time not engaging in censorship. It is also part of our institution’s responsibility to examine controversial aspects of the lives of famous people whose works have found a place in the cultural heritage of film.

== Illness and death ==
Schell died at the age of 83 on 1 February 2014, in Innsbruck, Austria, after a "sudden and serious illness". The German television news service Tagesschau reported that he had been receiving treatment for pneumonia. His funeral was attended by Waltraud Haas, Christian Wolff, Karl Spiehs, Lawrence David Foldes, Elisabeth Endriss, and Peter Kaiser. His grave is in Preitenegg/Carinthia (Austria).

Actor Jim Beaver, who studied under Schell at the University of Southern California, eulogized him as "one of the greatest actors of his generation, an astonishing performer of enormous power and breadth."

== Filmography ==
=== Film ===
Year	Title	Role	Notes
1955	Kinder, Mütter und ein General	Deserteur	
1955	The Plot to Assassinate Hitler	Member of the Kreisau Circle	
1955	Ripening Youth	Jürgen Sengebusch	
1956	The Girl from Flanders	Alexander Haller	
1956	The Marriage of Doctor Danwitz	Dr. Oswald Hauser	
1956	A Heart Returns Home	Wolfgang Thomas	
1957	The Last Ones Shall Be First	Lorenz Darrandt	
1958	The Young Lions	Captain Hardenberg	
1958	Ludmila	Josef Ospel	
1961	Judgment at Nuremberg	Hans Rolfe	
1962	Five Finger Exercise	Walter	
1962	The Condemned of Altona	Franz von Gerlach	
1962	The Reluctant Saint	Giuseppe	
1964	Topkapi	Walter Harper	
1965	Return from the Ashes	Stanislaus Pilgrin	
1965	The Doctor and the Devil		
1967	The Deadly Affair	Dieter Frey	
1967	The Desperate Ones	Marek	
1968	Counterpoint	General Schiller	
1968	The Castle	'K.'	
1968	Krakatoa, East of Java	Captain Hanson	
1969	Simón Bolívar	Simón Bolívar	
1970	Erste Liebe	Father	
1972	Paulina 1880	Michele Cantarini	
1972	Pope Joan	Adrian	
1973	The Pedestrian	Andreas Giese	
1974	The Odessa File	Eduard Roschmann	
1974	The Rehearsal		
1975	The Man in the Glass Booth	Arthur Goldman	
1975	Der Richter und sein Henker	Robert Schmied on Audiotape	Voice; Uncredited role
1975	The Day That Shook the World	Djuro Sarac	
1976	St. Ives	Dr. John Constable	
1977	Cross of Iron	Hauptmann von Stransky	
1977	A Bridge Too Far	Wilhelm Bittrich	
1977	Julia	Johann	
1979	Players	Marco	
1979	Geschichten aus dem Wienerwald	Theatre Visitor	Uncredited
1979	Avalanche Express	Col. Nikolai Bunin	
1979	Together?	Giovanni	
1979	The Black Hole	Dr. Hans Reinhardt	
1980	Arch of Triumph		
1981	The Chosen	Professor David Malter	
1983	Les Îles	Fabrice	
1984	Man Under Suspicion	Lawyer Landau	
1986	Laughter in the Dark		
1988	An American Place	Alfred Steiglitz	
1989	The Rose Garden	Aaron	
1990	The Freshman	Larry London	
1991	Labyrinth		
1993	A Far Off Place	Colonel Mopani Theron	
1993	Justice	Isaak Kohler	
1994	Little Odessa	Arkady Shapira	
1996	The Vampyre Wars	Rodan	
1997	Through Roses	Carl Stern	
1997	Telling Lies in America	Dr. Istvan Jonas	
1998	The Eighteenth Angel	Father Simeon	
1998	Left Luggage	Mr. Silberschmidt	
1998	Vampires	Cardinal Alba	
1998	Deep Impact	Jason Lerner	
1999	On the Wings of Love	Hochberg	
2000	I Love You, Baby	Walter Ekland	
2000	Just Messing About	Poser	
2001	Festival in Cannes	Viktor Kovner	
2006	The House of Sleeping Beauties	Kogi	
2008	The Brothers Bloom	Diamond Dog	
2009	Flores negras	Jacob Krinsten	
2015	Les brigands	Mr. Escher	Final film role; filmed in 2012

=== Television ===
==== TV series ====
Year	Title	Role	Notes
1959	Playhouse 90	Gunther, Otto Rolfe	2 episodes; including "Judgment at Nuremberg"
1959	Westinghouse Desilu Playhouse	Hans	1 episode
1960	Buick-Electra Playhouse	Max	1 episode
1960	NBC Sunday Showcase	Peter Gerard	1 episode
1960	Alcoa Theatre	Sarrail	1 episode
1960	Goodyear Theatre	Sarrail	1 episode
1967	Bob Hope Presents the Chrysler Theatre	August Holland	1 episode
1990	Wiseguy	Amado Guzman	6 episodes
2002	Liebe, Lügen, Leidenschaften	Franz Steininger	3 episodes
2003–07	Der Fürst und das Mädchen	Fürst Friedrich von Thorwald	36 episodes
2007	Giganten	Albert Einstein	1 episode
2007	Terra X - Rätsel alter Weltkulturen	Albert Einstein	1 episode

==== TV films and miniseries ====
Year	Title	Role	Notes
1961	Hamlet	Prince Hamlet	
1968	Heidi	Richard Sessemann	
1980	The Diary of Anne Frank	Otto Frank	
1983	The Phantom of the Opera	Sándor Korvin/The Phantom	
1986	Peter the Great	Peter the Great	
1991	Young Catherine	Frederick the Great	
1992	Miss Rose White	Mordecai Weiss	
1992	Stalin	Vladimir Lenin	
1993	Candles in the Dark	Colonel Arkush	Also director
1994	Abraham	Pharaoh	
1996	The Thorn Birds: The Missing Years	Cardinal Vittorio	
1999	Joan of Arc	Brother Jean le Maistre	
2003	Coast to Coast	Casimir	
2004	Die Rückkehr des Tanzlehrers	Fernando Hereira	
2005	Die Liebe eines Priesters	Pater Christoph	
2006	The Shell Seekers	Lawrence Sterne	
2007	Die Rosenkönigin	Karl Friedrich Weidemann	

== Partial stage credits ==
A non-exhaustive list of Maximillian Schell's theatre credits, both as actor and director:

Year	Title	Director	Actor	Role	Venue	Notes	Ref.
1958	Interlock		Yes	Paul	ANTA Theater, New York		
1959-60	Sappho		Yes		Deutsches Schauspielhaus, Hamburg		
1960	Hamlet		Yes	Prince Hamlet	August Theatre, Munich		
1965	A Patriot for Me		Yes	Alfred Redl	Royal Court Theatre, London		
1968	Hamlet	Yes	Yes	Prince Hamlet	Deutsches Theater, Munich		
1969	A Patriot for Me		Yes	Alfred Redl	Imperial Theatre, New York		
1972	Old Times		Yes	Deeley	Burgtheater, Vienna		
1975	La traviata	Yes		—N/a	Theater Basel, Basel		
1977	Tales from the Vienna Woods	Yes		—N/a	Royal National Theatre, London		
1978	Jedermann		Yes	Jederman	Salzburg Festival, Salzburg		
1979	Das weite Land	Yes		—N/a	Salzburg Festival, Salzburg		
1979	Undiscovered Country	Yes		—N/a	Salzburg Festival, Salzburg		
1979	Jedermann		Yes	Jederman	Salzburg Festival, Salzburg		
1980	Jedermann		Yes	Jederman	Salzburg Festival, Salzburg		
1980	Das weite Land	Yes		—N/a	Salzburg Festival, Salzburg		
1981	Jedermann		Yes	Jederman	Salzburg Festival, Salzburg		
1982	Jedermann		Yes	Jederman	Salzburg Festival, Salzburg		
1985	Der seidene Schuh		Yes	Don Rodrigo	Salzburg Festival, Salzburg		
1985	Jedermann		Yes	Jederman	Salzburg Festival, Salzburg		
1993-94	My Fair Lady		Yes	Professor Henry Higgins	Alte Oper, Frankfurt	Replacement	
2001	Judgment at Nuremberg		Yes	Ernst Janning	Longacre Theater, New York		
2001	Lohengrin	Yes		—N/a	Los Angeles Opera, Los Angeles		
2005	Der Rosenkavalier	Yes		—N/a	Los Angeles Opera, Los Angeles		
2005-06	Resurrection Blues		Yes	General Felix Barriaux	The Old Vic, London		

== Awards and nominations ==
Year	Award	Category	Nominated work	Result	Ref.
1961	Academy Award	Best Actor	Judgment at Nuremberg	Won	
1961	BAFTA Award	Best Actor in a Leading Role	Judgment at Nuremberg	Nominated	
1961	Golden Globe Award	Best Actor - Motion Picture Drama	Judgment at Nuremberg	Won	
1961	New York Film Critics Circle	Best Actor	Judgment at Nuremberg	Won	
1961	Laurel Award	Top Male Dramatic Performance	Judgment at Nuremberg	Nominated	
1975	Academy Award	Best Actor	The Man in the Glass Booth	Nominated	
1975	Golden Globe Award	Best Actor - Motion Picture Drama	The Man in the Glass Booth	Nominated	
1977	Academy Award	Best Supporting Actor	Julia	Nominated	
1977	Golden Globe Award	Best Supporting Actor - Motion Picture Draa	Julia	Nominated	
1977	National Society of Film Critics	Best Supporting Actor	Julia	Nominated	
1977	New York Film Critics Circle	Best Supporting Actor	Julia	Won	
1992	Primetime Emmy Award	Outstanding Lead Actor in a Miniseries or a Movie	Miss Rose White	Nominated	
1992	Golden Globe Award	Best Supporting Actor - Series, Miniseries or Television Film	Stalin	Won	
1992	Primetime Emmy Award	Outstanding Supporting Actor in a Miniseries or a Movie	Stalin	Nominated	

== See also ==
- List of oldest and youngest Academy Awards winners and nominees — Youngest winners for Best Lead Actor
- List of Academy Award winners and nominees from Switzerland
- List of Academy Award winners and nominees from Austria
- List of actors with Academy Award nominations
- List of actors with more than one Academy Award nomination in the acting categories
- List of Primetime Emmy Award winners
- List of Golden Globe winners
