= Viktor Urbantschitsch =

Austrian otologist (1847–1921)

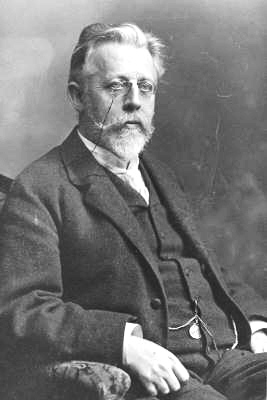
Viktor Urbantschitsch (c. 1920)

Viktor Urbantschitsch (10 September 1847, in Vienna – 17 June 1921, in Vienna) was an Austrian otologist.

== Biography ==
Viktor was the son of Alois Urbantschitsch, a Slovene physician from Upper Carniola, and his wife, Wilhelmine Mengele. He studied at the University of Vienna, receiving his medical doctorate in 1870 and his surgical degree in 1871. In 1873 he obtained his habilitation in otology and several years later was named head of the otology department at the general polyclinic in Vienna. In 1885 he became an associate professor and in 1907 succeeded Adam Politzer as head of the university ear hospital.

He is considered to be one of the founders of modern otology. He focused his attention on the physiology and psycho-physiology of the ear, and researched the influence that head movements had on sound perception. He stressed the significance of residual hearing and developed various diagnostic and rehabilitative methods. He was an early practitioner of electric current as a means of treatment, and also introduced a manual massage technique for the Eustachian tube.

== Personal life ==
Viktor had four children with his wife, Caroline:

1. Minna Wilhelmine Urbantschitsch (1873 – August 1943), married Pero Despic (1874 – April 1937), had one daughter.
2. Richard Urbantschitsch (1875 – 1948), never married.
3. Ernst Urbantschitsch (30 June 1877 – 1 July 1948), married Hildegard "Hilde" ... (d. 1954). Had one son, Victor Urbancic.
4. Rudolf von Urban (28 April 1879 – 18 December 1964), married Friederike "Fritzi" Rosali Persicaner (11 June 1879 – 10 April 1970), and divorced. Had two children. Later married Maria Mayen (11 May 1892 – 15 July 1978) and had one daughter together. Rudolf and Maria were the maternal grandparents of Christoph Waltz.

== Selected works ==
- Lehrbuch der Ohrenheilkunde, 1880.
- Über subjektive optische Anschauungsbilder, 1907.
- Über Störungen des Gedächtnisses infolge von Erkrankungen des Ohres, 1918.
- "Auditory training for deaf mutism and acquired deafness". Washington, D.C. : Alexander Graham Bell Association for the Deaf, (1982). Translation of: Über Hörübungen bei Taubstummheit und bei Ertaubung im späteren Lebensalter, translated by S. Richard Silverman.
