= Carl von Noorden (pathologist) =

German internist

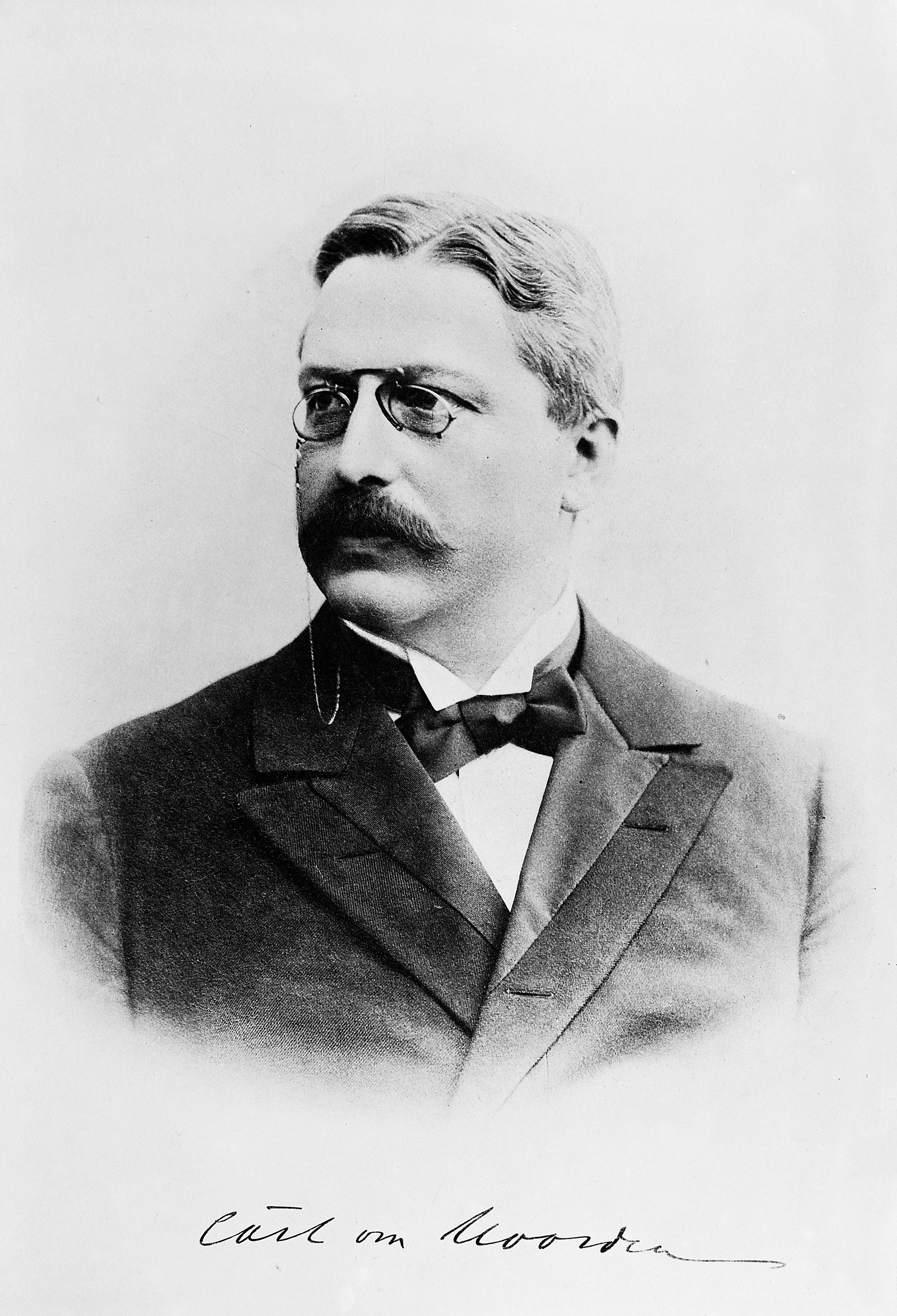
Karl von Noorden

Karl Harko von Noorden (13 September 1858 – 26 October 1944) was a German internist, born in Bonn and educated in medicine at Tübingen, Freiberg, and Leipzig (M.D., 1882).

In 1885 he was admitted as privatdocent to the medical facility of the University of Giessen, where he had been assistant in the medical clinic since 1883. In 1889 he became first assistant of the medical clinic at Berlin University, in 1894 was called to Frankfurt am Main as physician in charge of the municipal hospital, and in 1906 was appointed professor of medicine at the University of Vienna, as a successor to Carl Nothnagel.

Von Noorden made special researches involving albuminuria in health, metabolism disorders and its treatment, diabetes, diseases of the kidney, dietetics, etc., and wrote on these subjects, some of his books appearing in English. Among his assistants was the Austrian-American psychologist Rudolf von Urban.

Noorden advocated an "oat-cure" to treat diabetes. The diet "consisted of 250 gm. oatmeal a day - 80 gm. with about 0.4 liter water each meal and maybe some vegetables or fruits for the taste"

He died in Vienna. His father, also named Carl von Noorden (1833–1883) was a noted historian.

== Selected publications ==
His book on diabetes and its treatment, "Die zuckerkrankheit und ihre behandlung" (1895), was published over numerous editions. Some of his books have been published in English, such as:

- "Metabolism and practical medicine", (3 volumes, 1907).
- Clinical treatises on the pathology and therapy of disorders of metabolism and nutrition (8 volumes, 1903-09); with Karl Franz Dapper; Hugo Salomon; Hermann Strauss.
- New Aspects of Diabetes: Pathology and Treatment, 1913.

== Terms ==
- Noorden treatment—Oatmeal treatment. Treatment of diabetes by restricting the protein of the diet and limiting the carbohydrates to oatmeal.
