= Carl von Noorden =

German historian (1833–1883)

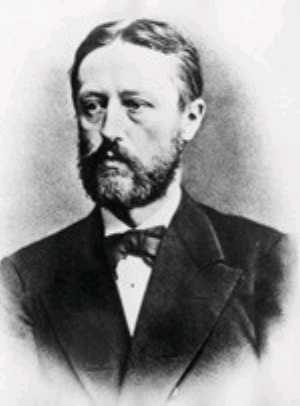
Carl von Noorden.

Carl Friedrich Johannes von Noorden (11 September 1833 – 25 December 1883) was a German historian who was a native of Bonn. He was a grandson to psychiatrist Christian Friedrich Nasse (1778–1851) and the father of pathologist Carl von Noorden (1858–1944).

== Biography ==
He studied at the Universities of Marburg, Berlin and Bonn, where he was a pupil of Heinrich von Sybel (1817–1895). In 1868 he became a professor of history at the University of Greifswald. Afterwards he served as a professor at Marburg (from 1870), Tübingen (from 1873), Bonn (from 1876) and Leipzig (from 1877). At the University of Leipzig, one of his students was Karl Lamprecht (1856–1915). After his death, his position at Leipzig was filled by his friend, Wilhelm Maurenbrecher (1838–1892).

Noorden published books on medieval and Renaissance history, and also works on European history from more recent times. He is known for writings on events that took place during the War of Spanish Succession, and works involving the historical era surrounding Charles V. In addition, he published a number of articles involving the political histories of England, France and the Netherlands. One of his better efforts was an unfinished book on the recent history of Spain.

Noorden was a catalyst in the founding of the Königlich-Sächsischen Historischen Seminars (Royal Saxon Historical Seminars) at the University of Leipzig (1877). He was a member of the Royal Saxon Society of Sciences in Leipzig, and from 1874 onward, a corresponding member of the Bavarian Academy of Sciences (Bayerischen Akademie der Wissenschaften).

He died on 25 December 1883 in Leipzig.

== Selected writings ==
- Die Sage von Helgi : Liederkreis nach der Edda, 1857 - The saga of Helgi; Circle of songs from the Edda.
- Hinkmar, Erzbischof von Reims, Bonn 1863 - (Hincmar, Archbishop of Reims 806–882.
- Der Rücktritt des Ministeriums Pitt im Jahre 1801, 1863 - Resignation of Prime Minister William Pitt the Younger in 1801.
- Die parlamentarische Parteiregierung in England, 1865 - The parliamentary government in England.
- Europäische Geschichte im 18. Jahrhundert, 1. Abteilg.: Der Spanische Erbfolgekrieg, Volumes 1-3 Düsseldorf 1870-1882 - European history in the 18th Century; The Spanish War of Succession.
- Sechs Jahre österreichischer Politik, 1871 - Six years of Austrian politics.
- Historischen Vorträge, eingeleitet und herausgegeben von Wilhelm Maurenbrecher, Leipzig 1884 - Historical lectures, initiated and edited by Wilhelm Maurenbrecher,
