= Euskirchen court shooting =

Mass shooting and suicide bombing in Euskirchen, Germany, 1994

- Erwin Mikolajczyk
- Location: Euskirchen, Germany
- Date: 9 March 1994; 12:58 p.m. (CET)
- Attack type: Mass murder, suicide bombing
- Weapons: .45-caliber Colt pistol Homemade bomb
- Deaths: 7 (including the perpetrator)
- Injuries: 8
- Perpetrator: Erwin Mikolajczyk

The Euskirchen court shooting was an act of mass murder that occurred at the district court in Euskirchen, Germany on 9 March 1994.

== Shooting ==
Just after his appeal against a sentence for assaulting his former girlfriend, Vera Lamesic, had ended with an upholding of his conviction, 39-year-old Erwin Mikolajczyk re-entered the court building armed with .45-caliber Colt pistol and a homemade bomb in a backpack. In the hallway, he approached Lamesic, hugged her, then fatally shot her, two women who had accompanied her, as well as two other people, and then entered the court room where he killed 33-year-old Alexander Schäfer, the judge who had convicted him. When he ran out of ammunition, Mikolajczyk killed himself by detonating the bomb. A total of eight people were also wounded in the attack.

=== Victims ===
- Peter Kurth
- Vera Lamesic, 56
- Agnes Müller
- Peter Preuß
- Marianne Rübsam
- Alexander Schäfer, 33

== In popular culture ==
The film Judgment Day, released the same year and starring Christoph Waltz as Erwin Mikolajczyk, is based on the incident.
