= List of awards and nominations received by Christoph Waltz =

Christoph Waltz awards and nominations
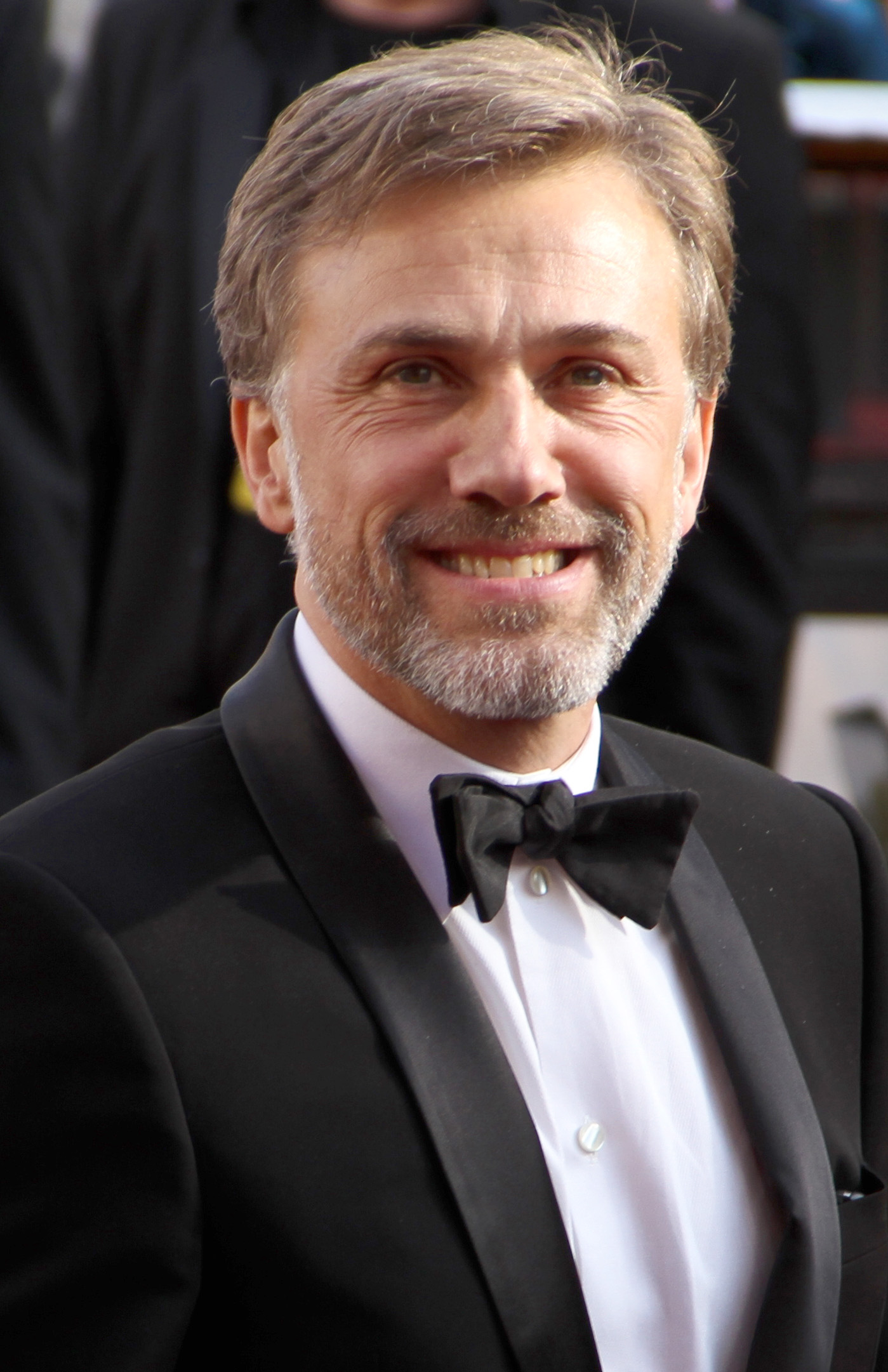
- Waltz at the 82nd Academy Awards in 2010
Awards and nominations
Award	Wins	Nominations
Golden Globe	2	3
Academy Awards	2	2
BAFTA Awards	2	2
Emmy Awards	0	1
Saturn Awards	0	2
Actor Awards	2	3
Cannes Film Festival	1	1

Totals (Note: Certain award groups do not simply award one winner. They acknowledge several different recipients, have runners-up, and have third place. Since this is a specific recognition and is different from losing an award, runner-up mentions are considered wins in this award tally. For simplification and to avoid errors, each award in this list has been presumed to have had a prior nomination.)
- Wins: 9
- Nominations: 14

The following is a list of awards and nominations received by Austrian and German actor Christoph Waltz.

== Major associations ==
=== Academy Awards ===
Year	Category	Nominated work	Result
2010	Best Supporting Actor	Inglourious Basterds	Won
2013	Best Supporting Actor	Django Unchained	Won

=== Actor Awards ===
Year	Category	Nominated work	Result
2010	Outstanding Performance by a Male Actor in a Supporting Role	Inglourious Basterds	Won
2010	Outstanding Performance by a Cast in a Motion Picture	Inglourious Basterds	Won
2026	Outstanding Performance by a Cast in a Motion Picture	Frankenstein	Nominated

=== British Academy Film Awards ===
Year	Category	Nominated work	Result
2010	Best Actor in a Supporting Role	Inglourious Basterds	Won
2013	Best Actor in a Supporting Role	Django Unchained	Won

=== Primetime Emmy Awards ===
Year	Category	Nominated work	Result
2020	Outstanding Actor in a Short Form Series	Most Dangerous Game	Nominated

=== Golden Globe Awards ===
Year	Category	Nominated work	Result
2010	Best Supporting Actor – Motion Picture	Inglourious Basterds	Won
2013	Best Supporting Actor – Motion Picture	Django Unchained	Won
2015	Best Actor in a Motion Picture – Musical or Comedy	Big Eyes	Nominated

== Miscellaneous awards ==
=== Adolf Grimme Award ===
Year	Category	Nominated work	Result
2001	Dance with the Devil	—N/a	Won
2002	One Hell of a Night	—N/a	Won

=== Cannes Film Festival ===
Year	Category	Nominated work	Result
2009	Best Actor	Inglourious Basterds	Won

=== Critics Choice Movie Awards ===
Year	Category	Nominated work	Result
2009	Best Supporting Actor	Inglourious Basterds	Won
2009	Best Acting Ensemble	Inglourious Basterds	Won

=== Empire Awards ===
Year	Category	Nominated work	Result
2010	Best Actor	Inglourious Basterds	Won
2012	Best Actor	Django Unchained	Nominated

=== MTV Movie & TV Awards ===
Year	Category	Nominated work	Result
2009	Best Movie Villain of the Year	Inglourious Basterds	Nominated
2011	Best Movie Villain of the Year	The Green Hornet	Nominated

=== Satellite Awards ===
Year	Category	Nominated work	Result
2009	Best Supporting Actor in a Film	Inglourious Basterds	Won
2011	Best Supporting Actor in a Film	Carnage	Nominated

=== Saturn Awards ===
Year	Category	Nominated work	Result
2009	Best Supporting Actor	Inglourious Basterds	Nominated
2012	Best Supporting Actor	Django Unchained	Nominated

== Decorations and other recognitions ==
In addition to the awards mentioned above:

- 1982: O.E. Hasse Prize from the Berlin Academy of Arts
- 2010: Romy: Favorite Actor
- 2010: Santa Barbara International Film Festival: Cinema Vanguard Award
- 2012: Austrian Cross of Honour for Science and Art
- 2014: Hollywood Walk of Fame
