= List of Academy Award winners and nominees from Austria =

This is a list of Academy Award winners and nominees from Austria.

== Best Picture ==
Best Picture
Year	Name	Film	Status	Milestone / Notes
1955	Sam Spiegel	On the Waterfront	Won	
1958	Sam Spiegel	The Bridge on the River Kwai	Won	
1960	Otto Preminger	Anatomy of a Murder	Nominated	
1961	Billy Wilder	The Apartment	Won	
1961	Fred Zinnemann	The Sundowners	Nominated	
1963	Sam Spiegel	Lawrence of Arabia	Won	
1967	Fred Zinnemann	A Man for All Seasons	Won	
1971	Ingo Preminger	M*A*S*H	Nominated	
1972	Sam Spiegel	Nicholas and Alexandra	Nominated	
2013	Veit Heiduschka; Michael Katz	Amour	Nominated	Shared with Stefan Arndt and Margaret Ménégoz.

== Best Director ==
Best Director
Year	Name	Film	Status	Milestone / Notes
1930	Josef von Sternberg	Morocco	Nominated	
1931	Josef von Sternberg	Shanghai Express	Nominated	
1944	Otto Preminger	Laura	Nominated	
1944	Billy Wilder	Double Indemnity	Nominated	
1945	Billy Wilder	The Lost Weekend	Won	
1948	Fred Zinnemann	The Search	Nominated	
1950	Billy Wilder	Sunset Boulevard	Nominated	
1952	Fred Zinnemann	High Noon	Nominated	
1953	Fred Zinnemann	From Here to Eternity	Won	
1953	Billy Wilder	Stalag 17	Nominated	
1954	Billy Wilder	Sabrina	Nominated	
1957	Billy Wilder	Witness for the Prosecution	Nominated	
1959	Billy Wilder	Some Like It Hot	Nominated	
1959	Fred Zinnemann	The Nun's Story	Nominated	
1960	Fred Zinnemann	The Sundowners	Nominated	
1960	Billy Wilder	The Apartment	Won	
1964	Otto Preminger	The Cardinal	Nominated	
1966	Fred Zinnemann	A Man for All Seasons	Won	
1977	Fred Zinnemann	Julia	Nominated	
2012	Michael Haneke	Amour	Nominated	

== Best Actor in a Leading Role ==
Best Actor
Year	Name	Film	Status	Milestone / Notes
1930	Paul Muni	The Valiant	Nominated	No official nominees were announced that year.
1934	Paul Muni	I Am a Fugitive from a Chain Gang	Nominated	
1936	Paul Muni	Black Fury	Nominated	This was a write-in candidate, who came in second on the final ballots. It was not an official nomination.
1937	Paul Muni	The Story of Louis Pasteur	Won	
1938	Paul Muni	The Life of Emile Zola	Nominated	
1960	Paul Muni	The Last Angry Man	Nominated	
1962	Maximilian Schell	Judgment at Nuremberg	Won	
1966	Oskar Werner	Ship of Fools	Nominated	

== Best Actor in a Supporting Role ==
Best Supporting Actor
Year	Name	Film	Status	Milestone / Notes
1938	Joseph Schildkraut	The Life of Emile Zola	Won	
1949	Oskar Homolka	I Remember Mama	Nominated	
1951	Erich von Stroheim	Sunset Boulevard	Nominated	
1956	Joe Mantell	Marty	Nominated	
1959	Theodore Bikel	The Defiant Ones	Nominated	
1986	Klaus Maria Brandauer	Out of Africa	Nominated	
2009	Christoph Waltz	Inglourious Basterds	Won	
2012	Christoph Waltz	Django Unchained	Won	

== Best Actress in a Leading Role ==
Best Actress
Year	Name	Film	Status	Milestone / Notes	Ref.
1936	Elisabeth Bergner	Escape Me Never	Nominated		

== Best Actress in a Supporting Role ==
Best Supporting Actress
Year	Name	Film	Status	Milestone / Notes	Ref.
1962	Lotte Lenya	The Roman Spring of Mrs. Stone	Nominated		
1964	Lilia Skala	Lilies of the Field	Nominated		

== Best Adapted Screenplay ==
Best Adapted Screenplay
Year	Name	Film	Status	Milestone / Notes
1940	Walter Reisch; Billy Wilder	Ninotchka	Nominated	
1942	George Froeschel	Mrs. Miniver	Won	
1942	George Froeschel	Random Harvest	Nominated	
1942	Billy Wilder	Hold Back the Dawn	Nominated	
1945	Walter Reisch	Gaslight	Nominated	
1945	Billy Wilder	Double Indemnity	Nominated	
1946	Billy Wilder	The Lost Weekend	Won	
1949	Billy Wilder	A Foreign Affair	Nominated	
1955	Billy Wilder	Sabrina	Nominated	

== Best Original Screenplay ==
Best Original Screenplay
Year	Name	Film	Status	Milestone / Notes
1951	Billy Wilder	Sunset Boulevard	Won	
1952	Billy Wilder	Ace in the Hole	Nominated	
1961	Billy Wilder	The Apartment	Won	
1966	Billy Wilder	The Fortune Cookie	Nominated	
2013	Michael Haneke	Amour	Nominated	

== Best Story ==
Best Story
Year	Name	Film	Status	Milestone / Notes
1946	Ernst Marischka	A Song to Remember	Nominated	

== Best International Feature Film ==
Best International Feature Film
Year	Director	Film	Original Title	Status	Milestone / Notes
1987	Wolfgang Glück	'38 – Vienna Before the Fall	38 – Auch das war Wien	Nominated	
2008	Stefan Ruzowitzky	The Counterfeiters	Die Fälscher	Won	
2009	Götz Spielmann	Revanche	Revanche	Nominated	
2013	Michael Haneke	Amour	Amour	Won	French-language film

== Best Art Direction ==
Best Art Direction
Year	Name	Film	Status	Milestone / Notes	Ref.
1950	Harry Horner	The Heiress	Won	Nominated in the black-and-white category.	
1950	William Kellner	Saraband for Dead Lovers	Nominated	Nominated in the color category.	
1960	William Kellner	Suddenly, Last Summer	Nominated	Nominated in the black-and-white category.	
1961	Harry Horner	Spartacus	Won	Nominated in color category.	
1970	Harry Horner	They Shoot Horses, Don't They?	Nominated		

== Best Cinematography ==
Best Cinematography
Year	Name	Film	Status	Milestone / Notes
1950	Franz Planer	Champion	Nominated	Nominated in the black-and-white category.
1952	Franz Planer	Death of a Salesman	Nominated	Nominated in the black-and-white category.
1954	Franz Planer	Roman Holiday	Nominated	Nominated in the black-and-white category.
1960	Franz Planer	The Nun's Story	Nominated	Nominated in the color category.
1962	Franz Planer	The Children's Hour	Nominated	
2010	Christian Berger	The White Ribbon	Nominated	

== Best Costume Design ==
Best Costume Design
Year	Name	Film	Status	Milestone / Notes
1963	Ruth Morley	The Miracle Worker	Nominated	

== Best Documentary ==
Best Documentary
Year	Name	Film	Status	Milestone / Notes
2006	Hubert Sauper	Darwin's Nightmare	Nominated	
2008	Werner Herzog	Encounters at the End of the World	Nominated	

== Best Editing ==
Best Editing
Year	Name	Film	Status	Milestone / Notes
1951	Oswald Hafenrichter	The Third Man	Nominated	
1973	Peter Zinner	The Godfather	Nominated	
1979	Peter Zinner	The Deer Hunter	Won	
1983	Peter Zinner	An Officer and a Gentleman	Nominated	
2022	Monika Willi	Tár	Nominated	

== Best Original Score ==
Best Original Music Score
Year	Name	Film	Status	Milestone / Notes
1935	Max Steiner	The Lost Patrol	Nominated	
1935	Max Steiner	The Gay Divorcee	Nominated	
1936	Max Steiner	The Informer	Won	
1936	Ernst Toch	Peter Ibbetson	Nominated	
1936	Leo F. Forbstein	Captain Blood	Nominated	This was a write-in candidate, who came in third on the final ballots. It was not an official nomination.
1936	Erich Wolfgang Korngold	Captain Blood	Nominated	
1937	Max Steiner	The Garden of Allah	Nominated	father Hungarian-Jewish Gábor, born in Temesvár
1937	Erich Wolfgang Korngold	Anthony Adverse	Won	
1937	Leo F. Forbstein	Anthony Adverse	Nominated	
1937	Leo F. Forbstein	The Charge of the Light Brigade	Nominated	
1938	Leo F. Forbstein	The Life of Emile Zola	Nominated	
1938	Hugo Riesenfeld	Make a Wish	Nominated	
1939	Erich Wolfgang Korngold	The Adventures of Robin Hood	Won	
1939	Erich Wolfgang Korngold	The Private Lives of Elizabeth and Essex	Nominated	
1939	Max Steiner	Jezebel	Nominated	
1940	Max Steiner	Dark Victory	Nominated	
1940	Max Steiner	Gone with the Wind	Nominated	
1941	Robert Stolz	Spring Parade	Nominated	
1941	Erich Wolfgang Korngold	The Sea Hawk	Nominated	
1941	Artie Shaw	Second Chorus	Nominated	
1941	Max Steiner	The Letter	Nominated	
1942	Max Steiner	Sergeant York	Nominated	
1943	Max Steiner	Now, Voyager	Won	
1943	Ernst Toch	Address Unknown	Nominated	
1943	Hans J. Salter	It Started with Eve	Nominated	
1944	Hans J. Salter	The Amazing Mrs. Holliday	Nominated	
1944	Hanns Eisler	Hangmen Also Die!	Nominated	
1944	Max Steiner	Casablanca	Nominated	
1945	Max Steiner	Since You Went Away	Won	
1945	Max Steiner	The Adventures of Mark Twain	Nominated	
1945	Robert Stolz	It Happened Tomorrow	Nominated	
1945	Hanns Eisler	None but the Lonely Heart	Nominated	
1945	Hans J. Salter	Christmas Holiday; The Merry Monahans	Nominated	
1946	Hans J. Salter	This Love of Ours	Nominated	
1946	Hans J. Salter	Can't Help Singing	Nominated	
1946	Max Steiner	Rhapsody in Blue	Nominated	
1947	Max Steiner	Night and Day	Nominated	Shared with Ray Heindorf.
1948	Max Steiner	Life with Father	Nominated	
1948	Max Steiner	My Wild Irish Rose	Nominated	
1949	Max Steiner	Johnny Belinda	Nominated	
1950	Max Steiner	Beyond the Forest	Nominated	
1951	Max Steiner	The Flame and the Arrow	Nominated	
1952	Max Steiner	A Place in the Sun	Won	
1953	Max Steiner	The Miracle of Our Lady of Fatima	Nominated	
1953	Max Steiner	The Jazz Singer	Nominated	
1955	Max Steiner	The Caine Mutiny	Nominated	
1956	Max Steiner	Battle Cry	Nominated	
1960	Ernest Gold	On the Beach	Nominated	
1961	Ernest Gold	Exodus	Won	
1964	Ernest Gold	It's a Mad, Mad, Mad, Mad World	Nominated	
1967	Elmer Bernstein	Thoroughly Modern Millie	Won	
1970	Ernest Gold	The Secret of Santa Vittoria	Nominated	
1974	Marvin Hamlisch	The Sting	Won	
1974	Marvin Hamlisch	The Way We Were	Won	
1975	Frederick Loewe	The Little Prince	Nominated	Nominated for Best Music, Scoring Original Song Score and/or Adaptation. Shared nomination with American-born Alan Jay Lerner, English-born Angela Morley and Australian-born Douglas Gamley.
1977	Marvin Hamlisch	The Spy Who Loved Me	Nominated	
1982	Marvin Hamlisch	Sophie's Choice	Nominated	

== Best Original Song ==
Best Original Song
Year	Name	Film	Song	Status	Milestone / Notes	Ref.
1942	Robert Stolz	Spring Parade	"Waltzing in the Clouds"	Nominated		
1959	Frederick Loewe	Gigi	"Gigi"	Won		
1964	Ernest Gold	It's a Mad, Mad, Mad, Mad World	"It's a Mad Mad Mad Mad World"	Nominated	Shared with Mack David.	
1975	Frederick Loewe	The Little Prince	"Little Prince"	Nominated		

== Best Sound Mixing ==
Best Sound Mixing
Year	Name	Film	Status	Milestone / Notes
1935	Carl Dreher	The Gay Divorcee	Nominated	
1936	Carl Dreher	I Dream Too Much	Nominated	

== Technical & Scientific ==
Technical/Scientific Awards
Year	Name	Film	Status	Milestone / Notes
1988	Fritz Gabriel Bauer	...	Won	Science
1992	Otto Nemenz		Won	(Technical Achievement Award)
1994	Fritz Gabriel Bauer	...	Won	Science
2000	Fritz Gabriel Bauer	...	Won	Science
2007	Martin Waitz		Won	(Technical Achievement Award)
1998	Markus Kurtz	Titanic	Won	Best visual effects
2002	Markus Kurtz	The Lord of the Rings: The Fellowship of the Ring	Won	(Best Visual Effects)
2013	Markus Kurtz	The Life of Pi	Won	

== Nominations and Winners ==
No. of wins	No. of nominations
41	145
