= Maria Mayen =

Austrian actress (1892-1978)

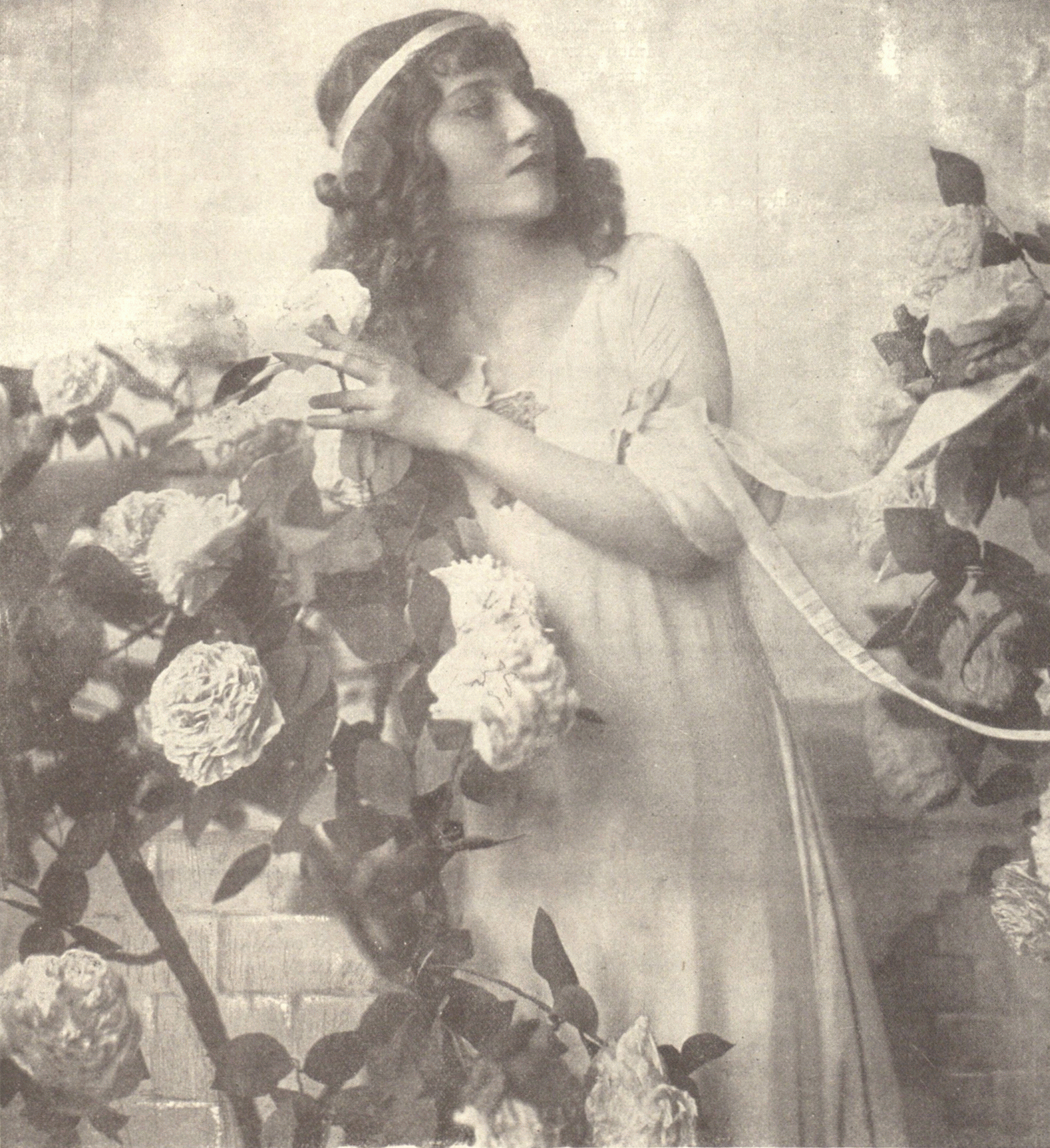
- Maria Mayen 1918 in Tadeusz Rittner's Garden of Youth by Franz Xaver Setzer
- Born: 11 May, 1892; Vienna
- Died: 15 July , 1978 (aged 86); Vienna
- Occupation: Actress

Maria Mayen, née Reimers, (11 May, 1892 in Vienna, Austria-Hungary – 15 July 1978 in Vienna, Austria) was an Austrian actress.

== Life ==
After training as an actress at the Marie Seebach School in Berlin, she worked at the Lessing Theater. From 1913, she performed at the Burgtheater in her hometown of Vienna. In 1926, she was awarded the title of Kammerschauspielerin (Actress of the Court).

Mayen married twice. Her daughter, Elisabeth Urbancic—from her first marriage to a physician named Rudolf Urbancic—is the mother of Academy Award-winning actor Christoph Waltz. .

== Theater ==
- Kollege Crampton, Komödie in fünf Akten von Gerhart Hauptmann, als Agnes
- Hanneles Himmelfahrt. Traumdichtung, Drama in zwei Akten von Gerhart Hauptmann, als Hannele
- The Sunken Bell. Ein deutsches Märchendrama, Versdrama in fünf Akten von Gerhart Hauptmann, als Rautdendelein
- Hamlet, Tragödie von William Shakespeare, als Ophelia
- Cordelia, Oper von Conradin Kreutzer, als Cordelia
- The Winter's Tale, Komödie von William Shakespeare, als Perdita
- Golgatha, Oratorium von Frank Martin
- The Rats, Tragikomödie in fünf Akten von Gerhart Hauptmann, als Alice Rütterbusch

== Film ==
- Das Haus ohne Lachen (1918)
- Konrad Hartls Lebensschicksal (1918)
- Seine tapfere Frau (1918)
- Adrian Vanderstraaten (1919)
- Don Juan (1919)
- Golgatha (1920)
- Donadieu (1962)
- Der Befehl (1967)
