= Preitenegg =

- Municipality
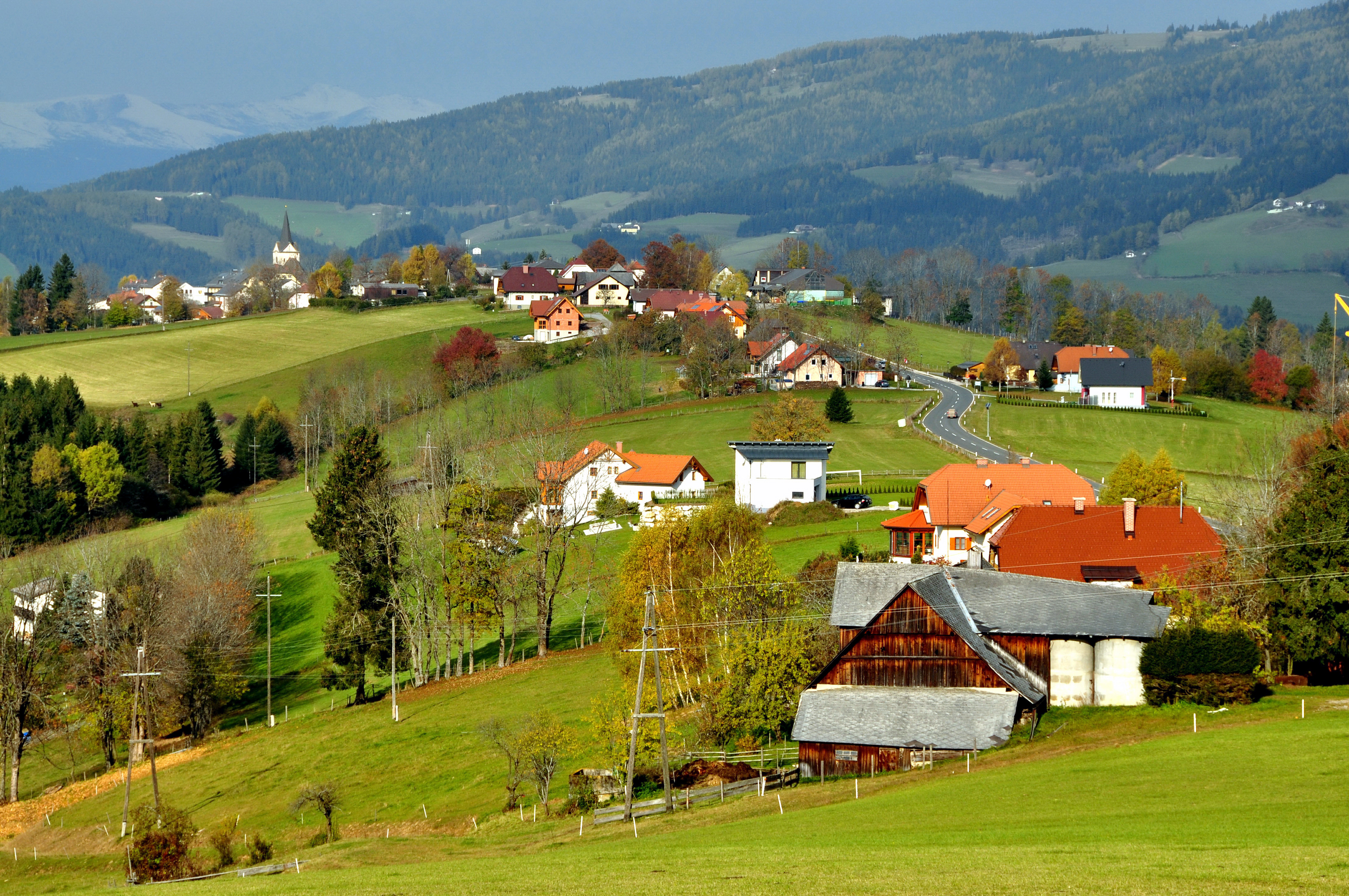

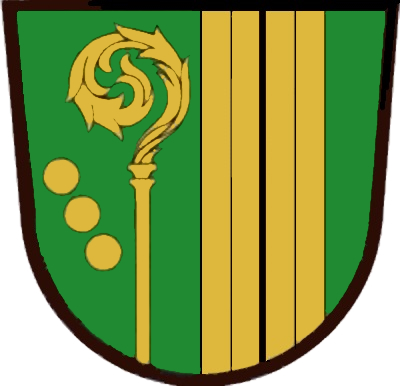
- Coat of arms

- Location within Austria
- Coordinates: 46°56′N 14°55′E
- Country: Austria
- State: Carinthia
- District: Wolfsberg

Government
  - Mayor: Franz Kogler (ÖVP)

Area
  - Total: 68.35 km^{2} (26.39 sq mi)
- Elevation: 1,076 m (3,530 ft)

Population (2018-01-01)
  - Total: 932
  - Density: 13.6/km^{2} (35.3/sq mi)
- Time zone: UTC+1 (CET)
  - Summer (DST): UTC+2 (CEST)
- Postal code: 9451
- Area code: 04354
- Website: www.preitenegg.at

Preitenegg (Slovene: Pratnik) is a municipality in the district of Wolfsberg in the Austrian state of Carinthia.

== Geography ==
Preitenegg lies on the northeastern rim of Carinthia in the upper Lavant valley. The municipality stretches along the slopes of the Packalpe and Koralpe mountain ranges, both part of the Lavanttal Alps. In the east, the Pack Saddle mountain pass marks the boundary with the state of Styria. Due to its picturesque setting, the mountain village today strongly relies on tourism, including cross-country skiing in winter.

The municipal area comprises the cadastral communities of Kleinpreitenegg, Oberauerling, Oberpreitenegg, Preitenegg, Unterauerling, and Unterpreitenegg.

== History ==
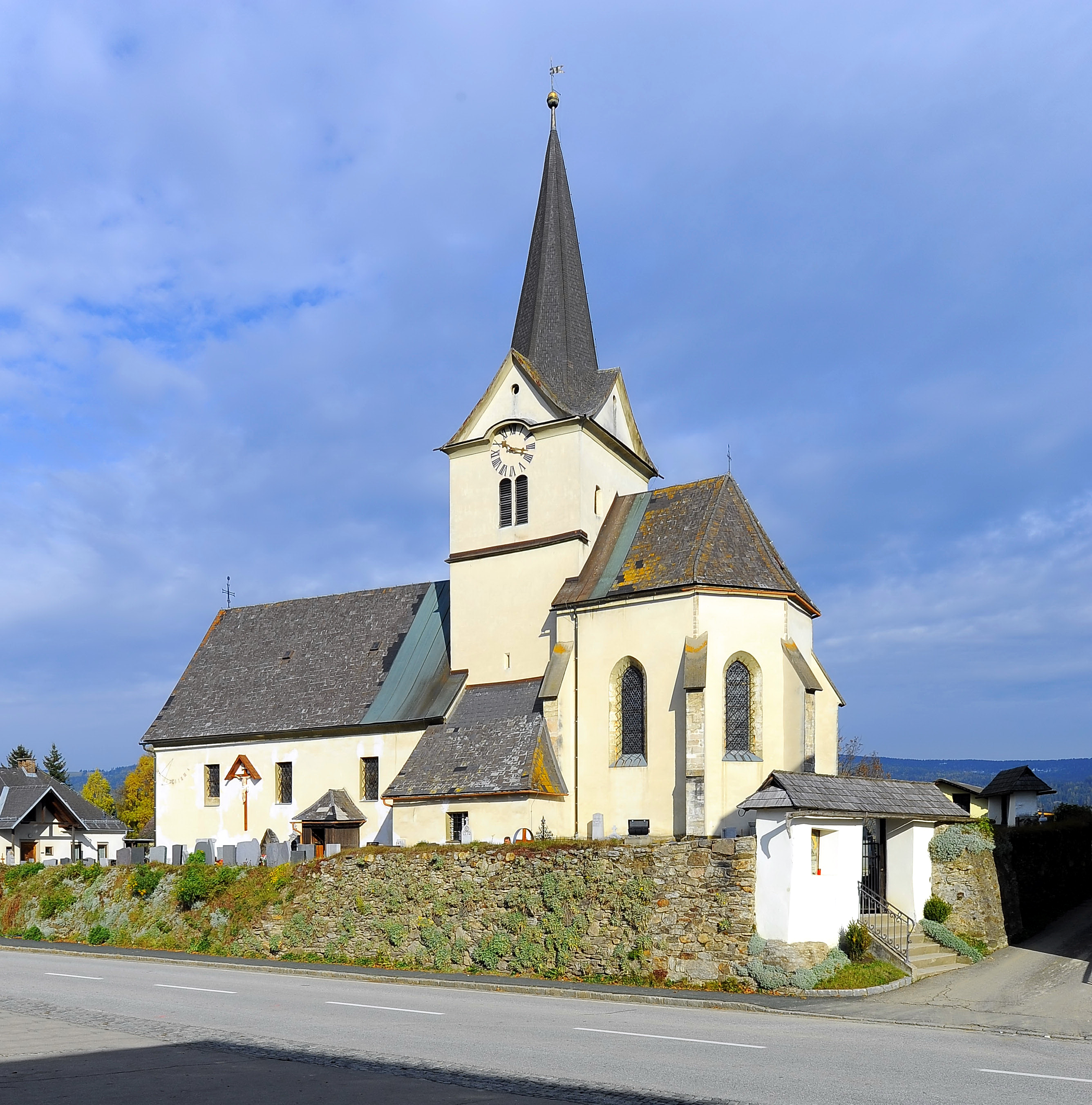
St Nicholas parish church

From the 11th century onwards, the upper Lavant valley belonged to the Bamberg ecclesiastical estates within the Duchy of Carinthia, ruled by episcopal ministeriales residing at Waldenstein Castle near Wolfsberg. The local St Nicholas Church was first mentioned in 1288, when the bailiwick (Vogtei) passed to the Bishop of Lavant.

Preitenegg itself first appeared in a 1328 deed. The linear village arose on the historic country road (Packer Straße), originally only a mule track, that ran from Carinthia across the Pack Saddle to the Styrian capital Graz.

In 1695 the Waldenstein estates were acquired by the noble House of Schönborn, in 1852 they passed to Henckel von Donnersmarck family. The present-day municipality was established in 1849. From 1930 to 1936 the Pack Saddle road was upgraded as a Bundesstraße federal highway. Preitenegg later was relieved of heavy traffic by the opening of the parallel Süd Autobahn motorway in the 1980s.

== Politics ==
Seats in the municipal assembly (Gemeinderat) as of 2015 local elections:

- Austrian People's Party (ÖVP): 5
- Social Democratic Party of Austria (SPÖ): 4
- Freedom Party of Austria (FPÖ): 2

== Notable people ==
- Maria Schell (1926–2005), actress, died at her home in Oberpreitenegg
- Maximilian Schell (1930–2014), actor, received honorary citizenship in 2005
