= Christoph Waltz =

Austrian, German, and American actor (born 1956)

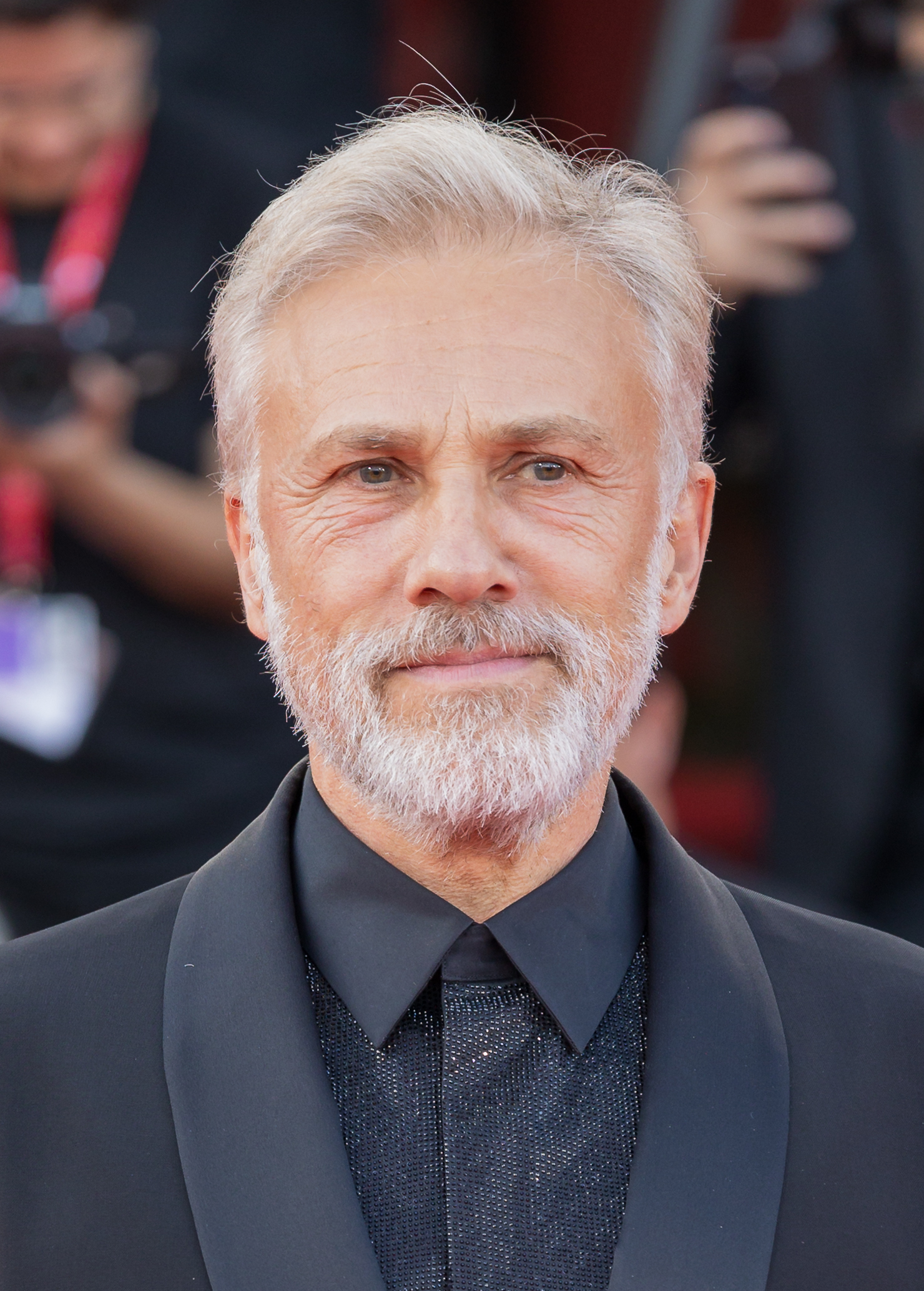
- Waltz at the 2025 Venice Film Festival
- Born: 4 October 1956 (age 70); Vienna, Austria
- Citizenship: Austria; Germany; United States (from 2020)
- Occupation: Actor
- Years active: 1977–present
- Works: Full list
- Spouses: Jacqueline Rauch (divorced): Judith Holste
- Children: 4
- Relatives: Rudolf von Urban (grandfather)
- Awards: Full list

Christoph Waltz (German: [ˈkʁɪstɔf ˈvalts]; born 4 October 1956) is an Austrian, German and American actor. Waltz gained international recognition for his portrayal of villainous and supporting roles in English-language films. His accolades include two Academy Awards, two BAFTAs, and two Golden Globes, as well as a nomination for a Primetime Emmy Award.

After a substantial career in German television and theatre, Waltz's international breakthrough role came in Quentin Tarantino's 2009 film Inglourious Basterds, in which he played Hans Landa, for which he received the Academy Award for Best Supporting Actor and the Cannes Film Festival Award for Best Actor. He collaborated with Tarantino again in Django Unchained (2012), for which he earned his second Academy Award for Best Supporting Actor, this time for his performance as a bounty hunter named Dr. King Schultz.

Waltz also starred in Carnage (2011), The Zero Theorem (2013), Big Eyes (2014), Downsizing (2017), Alita: Battle Angel (2019), The French Dispatch (2021), Frankenstein and Dracula (both 2025). He appeared as Ernst Stavro Blofeld in the James Bond films Spectre (2015) and No Time to Die (2021).

== Early life and education ==
Waltz was born on 4 October 1956 in Vienna, the son of Johannes Waltz, a German set designer, and Elisabeth Urbancic, an Austrian costume designer. He comes from a family of theatrical heritage: his maternal grandmother was Burgtheater and silent film actress Maria Mayen, and his step-grandfather, Emmerich Reimers, and his great-grandfather, Georg Reimers, were both stage actors who also appeared in silent films. Waltz's maternal grandfather, Rudolf von Urban, was a psychiatrist of Slovene descent (Note: Rudolf's father was Viktor Urbantschitsch, son of Alois Urbantschitsch (Alojz Urbančič), who was born in Preddvor, today part of Slovenia and then part of the Kingdom of Illyria, Austrian Empire. Through Alojz, Waltz is related to Josipina Urbančič, Alojz's first cousin, and one of the first Slovene female poets and composers.) and student of Sigmund Freud. Waltz's father died when he was seven years old, and his mother later married composer and conductor Alexander Steinbrecher. Steinbrecher was previously married to director Michael Haneke's mother; as a result, Waltz and Haneke shared the same stepfather.

Waltz had a passion for opera as a youth, having seen his first opera (Turandot with Birgit Nilsson in the title role) at around the age of 10. He would visit the opera twice a week as a teenager. Uninterested in theatre, he wished to become an opera singer. After graduating from Theresianum, Waltz went to study acting at the University of Music and Performing Arts Vienna's Max Reinhardt Seminar. At the same time, he also studied singing and opera at the university, but eventually decided that his voice was not good enough for an opera career. In the late 1970s, Waltz spent some time in New York City, where he trained with Lee Strasberg and Stella Adler. He studied script interpretation under Adler and credits his analytical approach to her teaching.

== Career ==
On his return to Europe, Waltz found work as a stage actor, making his debut at the Schauspielhaus Zürich. He also performed in Vienna, Salzburg, Cologne and Hamburg. He became a prolific television actor in the years 1980 to 2000. In 2000, he made his directorial debut, with the German television production Wenn man sich traut. In 1990, he played Dr. Hans-Joachim Dorfmann in the British TV series The Gravy Train opposite Ian Richardson. The show is a story of intrigue and misdeeds set in the offices of the European Union in Brussels. In 2007, Waltz narrated the audiobook of Robert Sapolsky's German version of A Primate's Memoir, Mein Leben als Pavian.

In Quentin Tarantino's 2009 film Inglourious Basterds, Waltz portrayed SS-Standartenführer Hans Landa, also known as "The Jew Hunter". Clever, courteous, multilingual—but also self-serving, implacable and murderous—the character of Landa was such that Tarantino feared he "might have written a part that was un-playable". Waltz received the Best Actor Award for the performance at the 2009 Cannes Film Festival and received acclaim from critics and the public. In 2009, he began sweeping critics' awards circuits, receiving awards for Best Supporting Actor from the New York Film Critics Circle, the Boston Society of Film Critics, Los Angeles Film Critics Association, as well as Best Supporting Actor awards at the Golden Globes and the Actor Awards.

The following month, he won the BAFTA for Best Supporting Actor, and won the Academy Award for Best Supporting Actor. Tarantino acknowledged the importance of Waltz to his film by stating: "I think that Landa is one of the best characters I've ever written and ever will write, and Christoph played it to a tee. It's true that if I couldn't have found someone as good as Christoph I might not have made Inglourious Basterds".

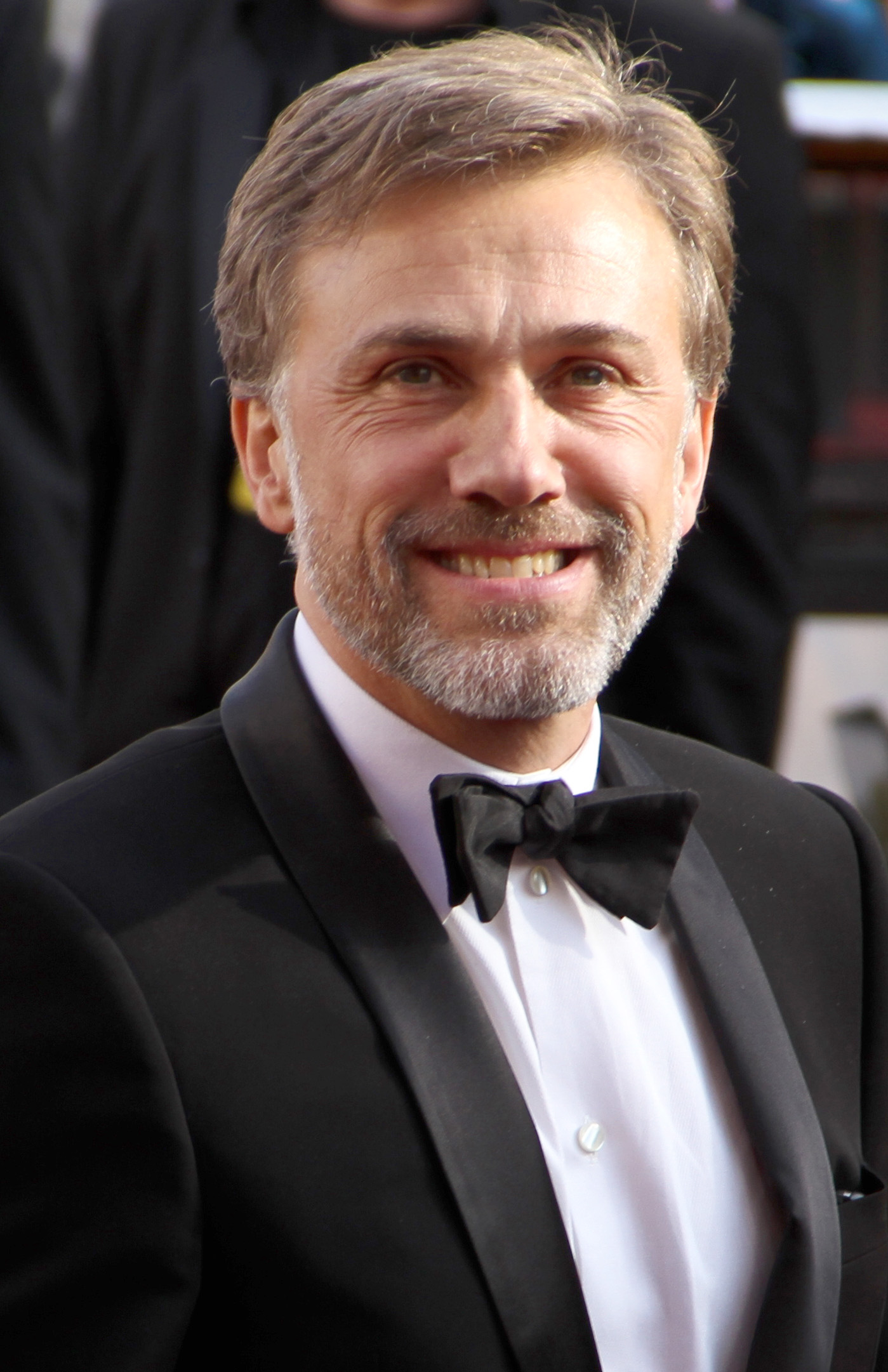
Waltz at the 82nd Academy Awards

Waltz played gangster Benjamin Chudnofsky in The Green Hornet (2011); that same year, he starred in Water for Elephants and Roman Polanski's Carnage. He played German bounty hunter King Schultz in Quentin Tarantino's Django Unchained (2012), a role Tarantino wrote specifically for Waltz. During a training accident before filming, Waltz injured his pelvis, though it did not impact his role in the film. His role garnered him acclaim once again, with Waltz winning the Golden Globe, the BAFTA, and ultimately the Academy Award for Best Supporting Actor.

In April 2013, he was selected as a member of the main competition jury at the 2013 Cannes Film Festival. He directed a production of the opera Der Rosenkavalier at the Vlaamse Opera in Antwerp in late 2013, and in Ghent in early 2014. In 2014, he was selected as a member of the jury for the 64th Berlin International Film Festival. He starred as Walter Keane in Tim Burton's Big Eyes, which opened on 25 December 2014, and appeared as Ernst Stavro Blofeld in Spectre, the 24th film in the James Bond franchise.

In July 2016, he portrayed lead villain Captain Leon Rom, a corrupt Belgian captain, in The Legend of Tarzan.

In 2017, Waltz appeared in the films Tulip Fever and Downsizing. In 2019, Waltz appeared in the action fantasy Alita: Battle Angel. He directed a production of the opera Falstaff, again at the Vlaamse Opera in Antwerp in late 2017, and in Ghent in early 2018.

In 2018, Waltz agreed to play the leading role in a film adaptation of the novel The Nazi and the Barber. He described the main role, that of mass murderer Max Schulz, as a "juicy role".

In 2019, Waltz directed and starred in the crime film Georgetown, in which he portrays a man suspected of murdering his wife to raise his social status. The film premiered at the 2019 Tribeca Film Festival and was released to cinemas on 14 May 2021.

In 2020, Waltz starred in the web series Most Dangerous Game, receiving his first Primetime Emmy Award nomination.

In 2021, he reprised the role of Ernst Stavro Blofeld in the James Bond film No Time to Die.

He starred in the Amazon Prime series The Consultant in 2023.

Waltz received an Icon award at the Newport Beach Film Festival on 17 October 2024, in recognition of his career. The festival opened with the premiere of the movie Old Guy, starring Waltz.

In March 2025, it was announced he would join Season 5 of Only Murders in the Building on Hulu. It was later confirmed that he would portray the recurring character of Bash Steed, an artificial intelligence tycoon and murder suspect.

The same year saw the release of Luc Besson's film Dracula, in which he played a significant supporting role, the priest who hunts Dracula. It was the biggest French film of the year, with a budget of over $50 million. The film was filmed in English.

== Personal life ==
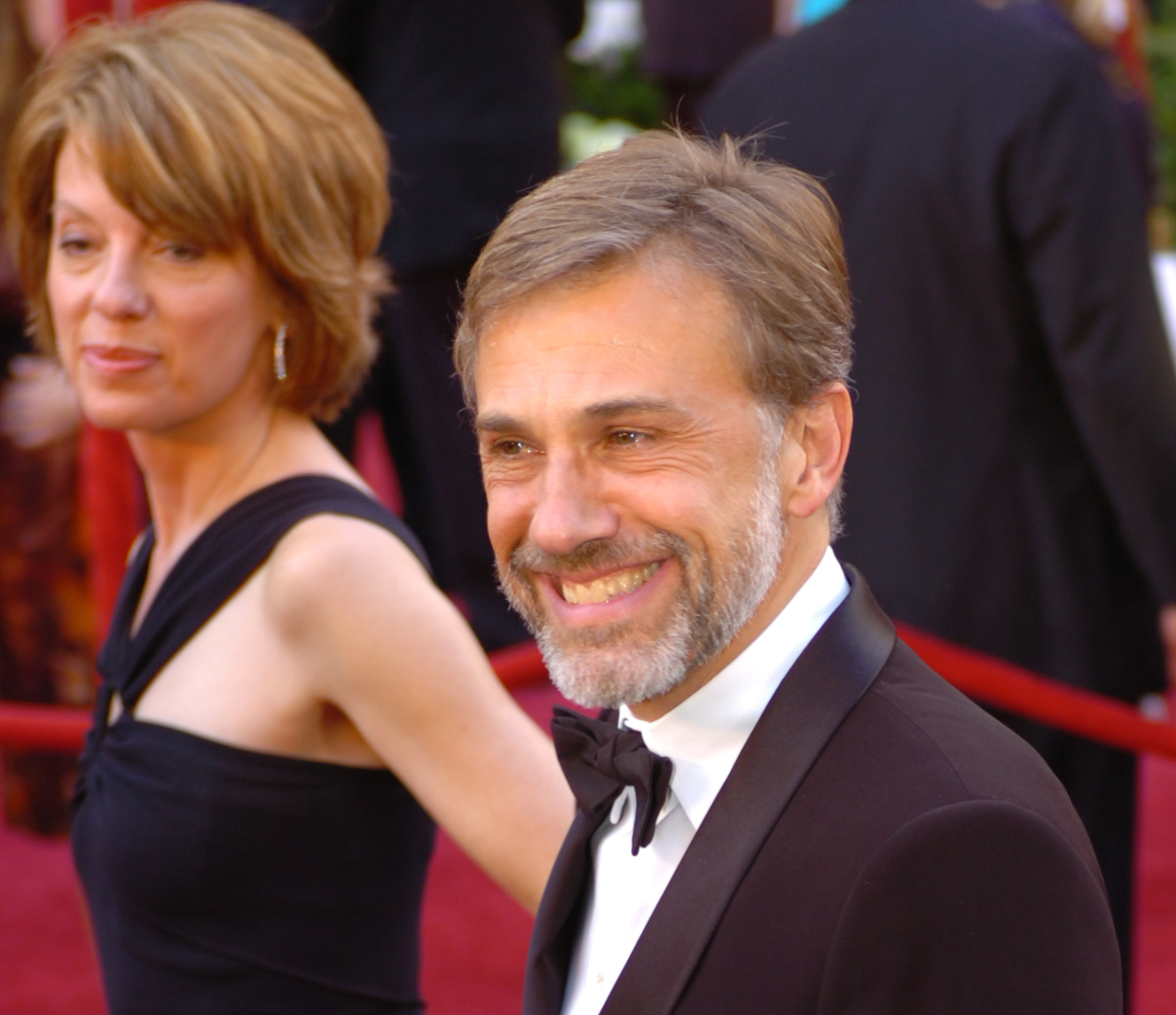
Waltz with wife Judith Holste at the 2010 Academy Awards

Waltz was born in Vienna to an Austrian mother and German father. Due to the legal situation of the time, his father could only request a German citizenship certificate for him. Being born to an Austrian mother, Waltz was Austrian by birthright, and requested his Austrian citizenship certificate in 2010, thus holding citizenships of both Austria and Germany, but considers that he also has a German passport a "legal, citizenship law banality". Asked whether he felt Viennese, he responded: "I was born in Vienna, grew up in Vienna, went to school in Vienna, graduated in Vienna, studied in Vienna, started acting in Vienna — and there would be a few further Viennese links. How much more Austrian do you want it?" He received American citizenship by naturalization in 2020, noting that he strongly believed "in this old dictum of no taxation without representation" as he had been living in Los Angeles, paying US tax, since 2010.

Waltz has three children with his former wife, Jacqueline (née Rauch), a dance therapist originally from New York. The couple lived in London, and their marriage lasted 17 years. Their family life included events abroad, including the 2013 wedding of the two's daughter Miriam in Jerusalem. Waltz is married to German costume designer Judith Holste, with whom he has a daughter. They divide their time between Berlin and Los Angeles.

== Filmography and accolades ==
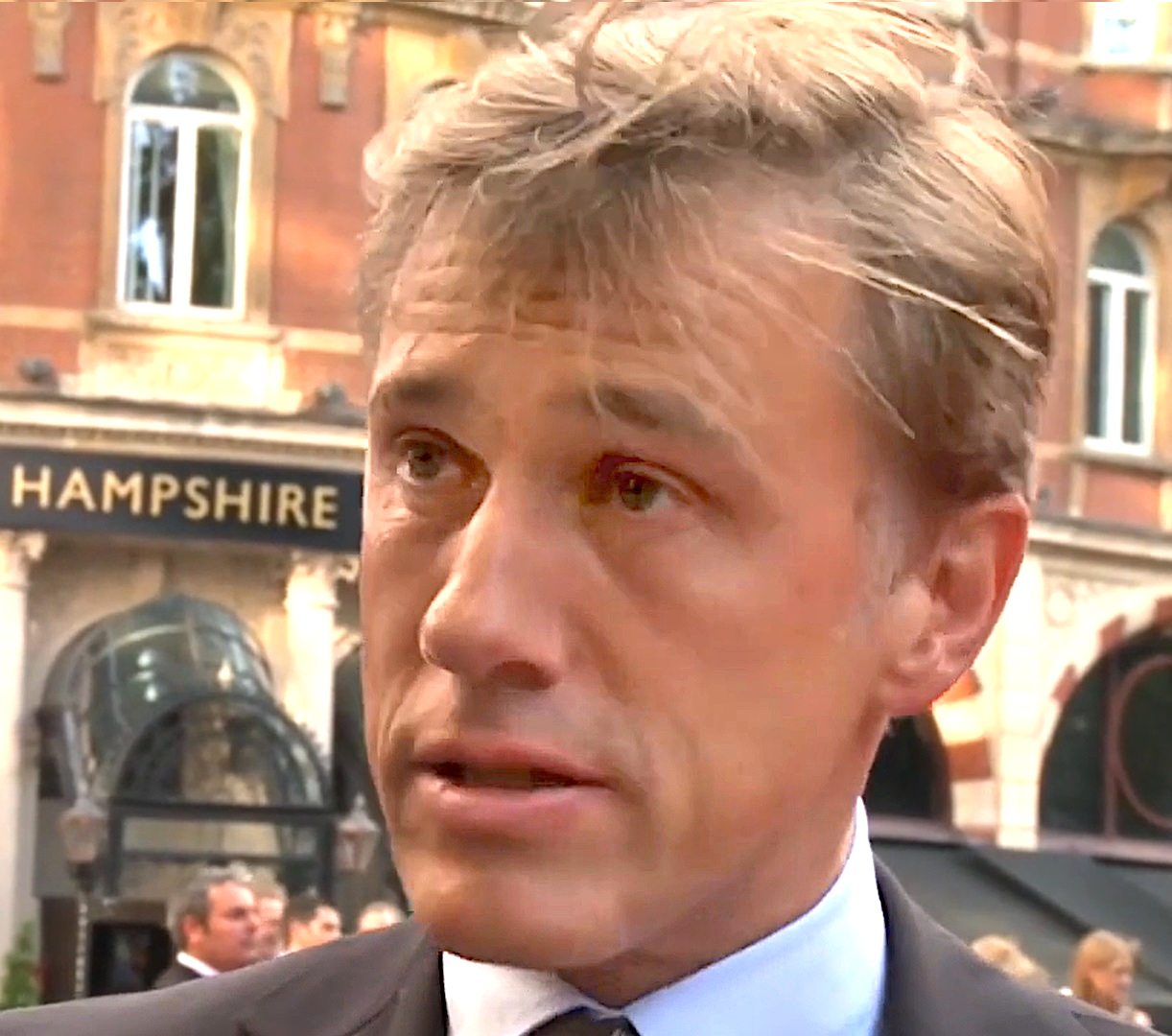
Waltz at the UK premiere of Inglourious Basterds, Leicester Square, 23 July 2009

== See also ==
- List of Academy Award winners and nominees from Austria
- List of Academy Award winners and nominees from Germany
- List of actors with Academy Award nominations
- List of actors with more than one Academy Award nomination in the acting categories
- List of actors with two or more Academy Awards in acting categories
- List of Golden Globe winners
