= 70th Academy Awards =

- Official poster by Arnold Schwartzman
- Date: March 23, 1998
- Site: Shrine Auditorium; Los Angeles, California, U.S.
- Hosted by: Billy Crystal
- Produced by: Gil Cates
- Directed by: Louis J. Horvitz

Highlights
- Best Picture: Titanic
- Most awards: Titanic (11)
- Most nominations: Titanic (14)

TV in the United States
- Network: ABC
- Duration: 3 hours, 47 minutes
- Ratings: 57.25 million 35.32% (Nielsen ratings)

The 70th Academy Awards ceremony, organized by the Academy of Motion Picture Arts and Sciences (AMPAS), took place on March 23, 1998, at the Shrine Auditorium in Los Angeles beginning at 6:00 p.m. PST / 9:00 p.m. EST. During the show, AMPAS presented Academy Awards (commonly referred to as Oscars) in 24 categories honoring films released in 1997. The ceremony, which was televised in the United States by ABC, was produced by Gil Cates and directed by Louis J. Horvitz. Actor Billy Crystal hosted the show for the sixth time. He had first hosted the 62nd ceremony held in 1990, and most recently the previous year's awards. Nearly a month earlier in an event held at the Regent Beverly Wilshire Hotel in Beverly Hills, California on February 28, the Academy Awards for Technical Achievement were presented by host Ashley Judd.

Titanic won 11 awards, including Best Picture, a number that is tied with Ben-Hur and The Lord of the Rings: The Return of the King. Other winners included As Good as It Gets, Good Will Hunting, and L.A. Confidential with two awards, and Character, The Full Monty, Geri's Game, The Long Way Home, Men in Black, A Story of Healing, and Visas and Virtue with one. The telecast garnered more than 57 million viewers in the United States, making it the most-watched Oscars broadcast in history.

== Winners and nominees ==
The nominees for the 70th Academy Awards were announced on February 10, 1998, at the Samuel Goldwyn Theater in Beverly Hills, California, by Robert Rehme, president of the academy, and actress Geena Davis. Titanic led all nominees with fourteen nominations, tying with All About Eve (1950) for the most Oscar nominations in history. (Note: Subsequently, La La Land (2016) received 14 nominations at the 89th Academy Awards. The tied record was broken by Sinners (2025), which received 16 nominations at the 98th Academy Awards.) Good Will Hunting and L.A. Confidential came in second with nine apiece.

The winners were announced during the awards ceremony on March 23, 1998. With eleven awards, Titanic tied with Ben-Hur (1959) for the most Academy Awards in Oscar history. (Note: The Lord of the Rings: The Return of the King (2003) has since equaled this record with eleven wins.) It also became the first film to win Best Picture without a screenwriting nomination since The Sound of Music (1965). Due to Titanic, James Cameron became the first person to win as a producer, director and editor in one night. Jack Nicholson received his eleventh acting nomination, becoming the most nominated man in acting categories. He also became the fourth performer to win at least three acting Oscars. Both Nicholson and Helen Hunt won for their roles in As Good as It Gets, making it the seventh film to win both lead acting awards. Nominated for their performances as Rose DeWitt Bukater in Titanic, Best Actress nominee Kate Winslet and Best Supporting Actress nominee Gloria Stuart became the first pair of performers nominated for portraying the same character in the same film. At the age of 87, Stuart became the oldest acting nominee in Oscars history.

=== Awards ===
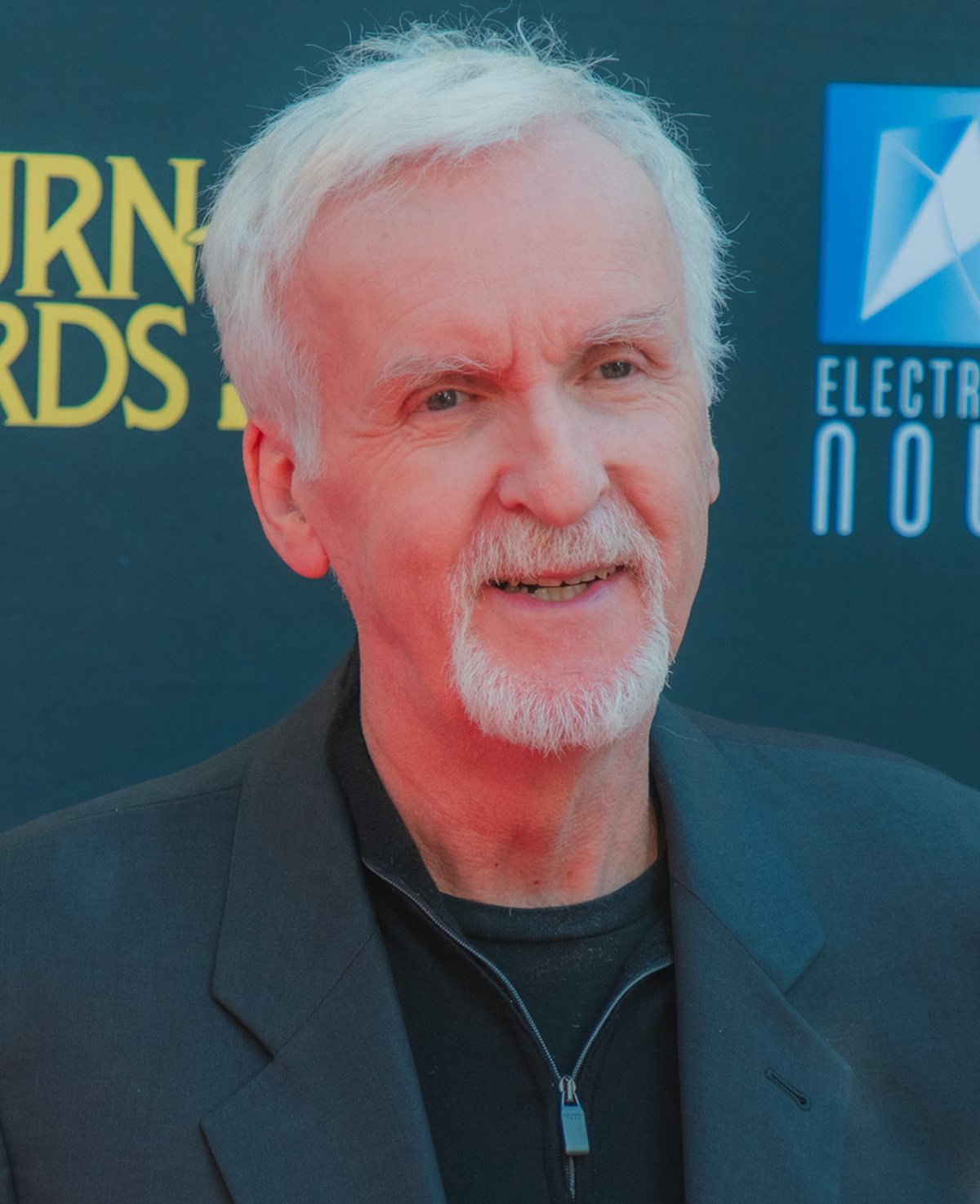
James Cameron, Best Picture and Best Film Editing co-winner, and Best Director winner

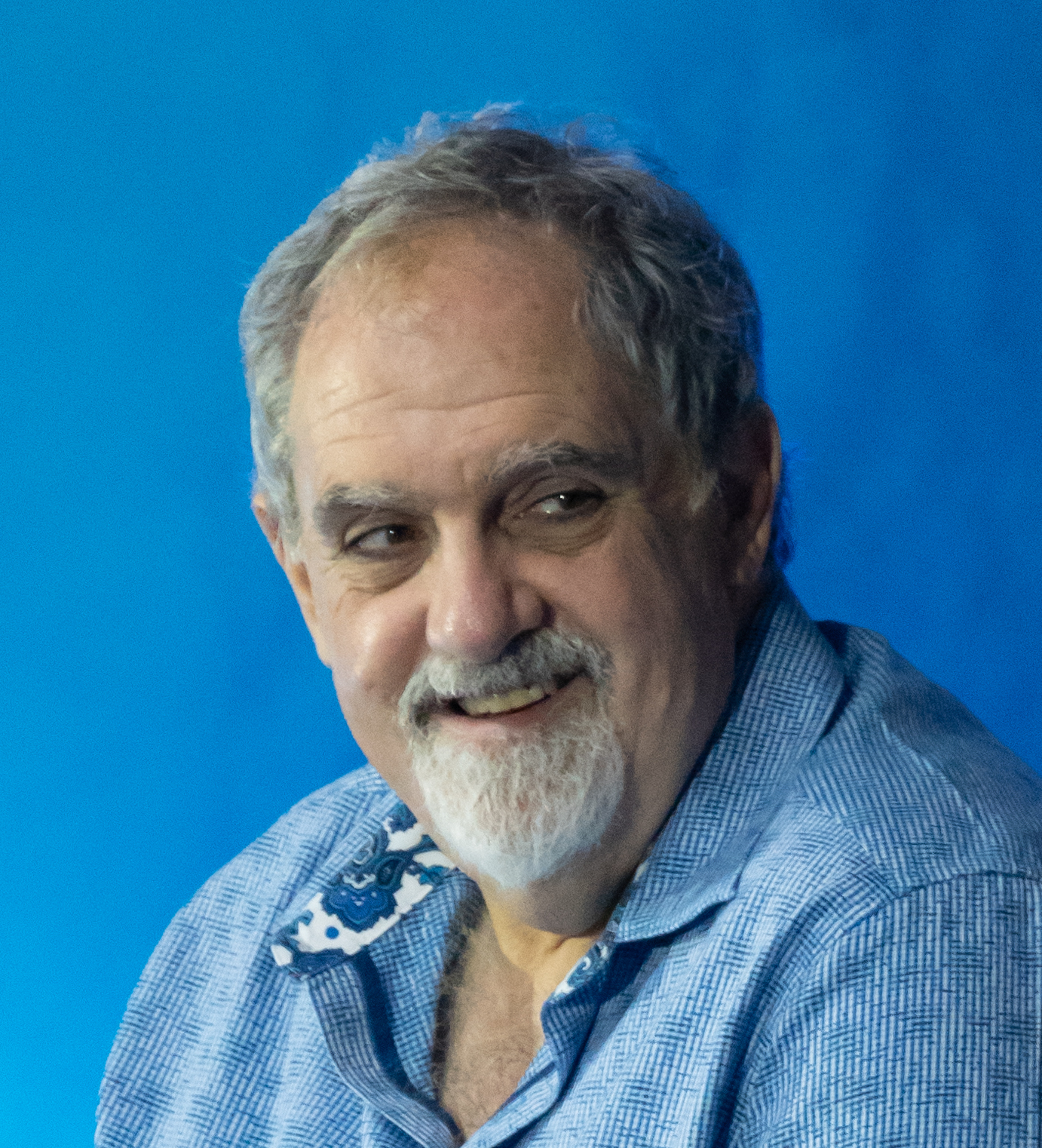
Jon Landau, Best Picture co-winner

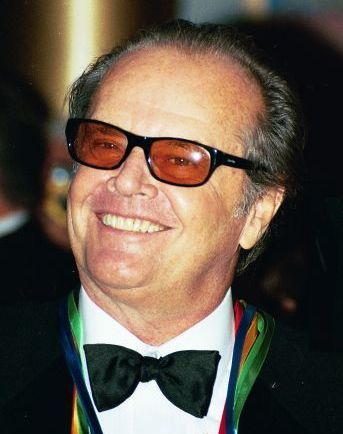
Jack Nicholson, Best Actor winner

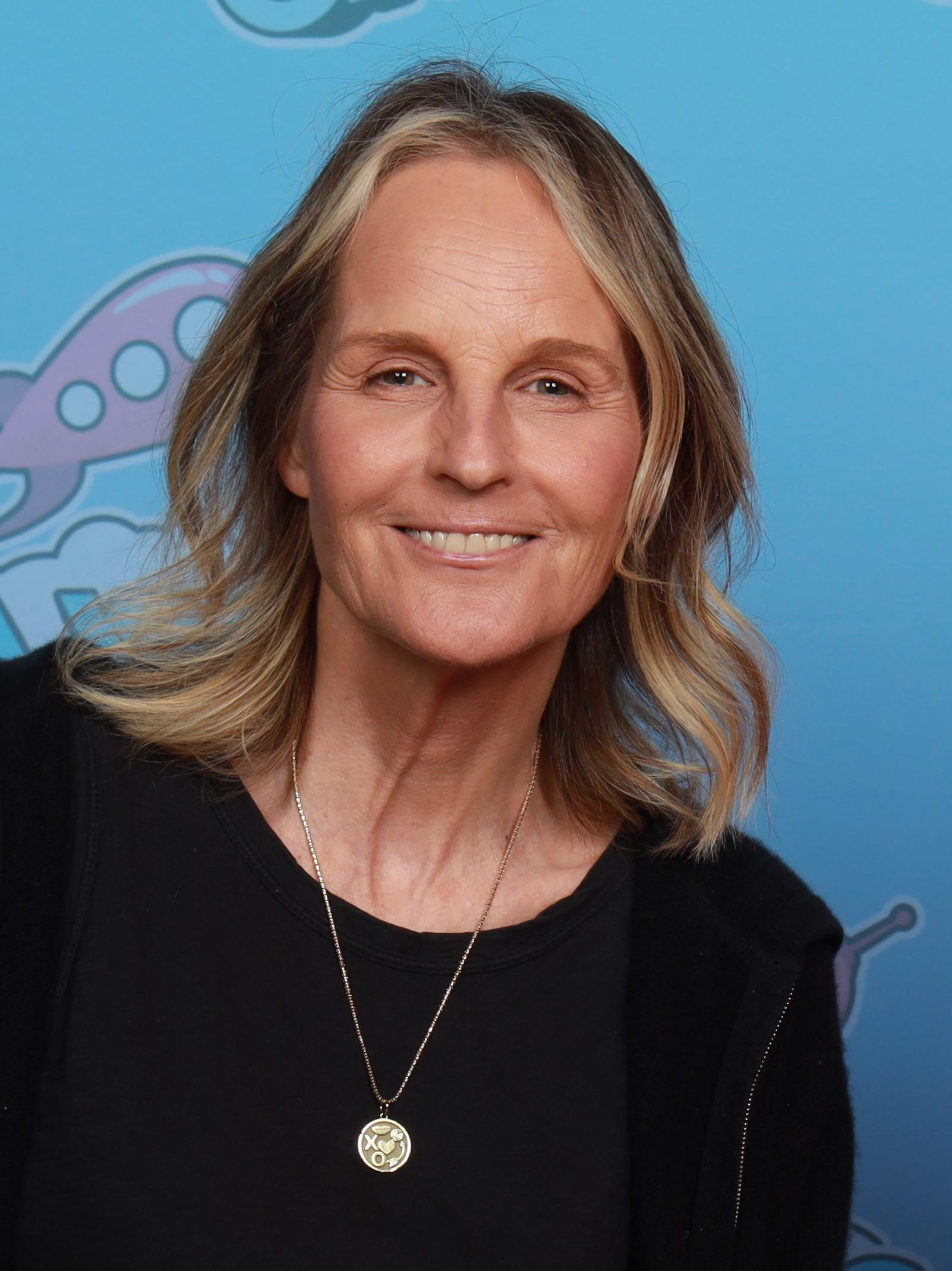
Helen Hunt, Best Actress winner

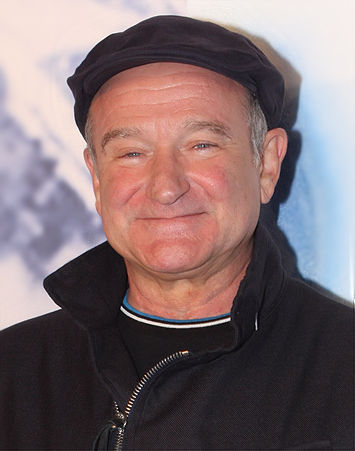
Robin Williams, Best Supporting Actor winner

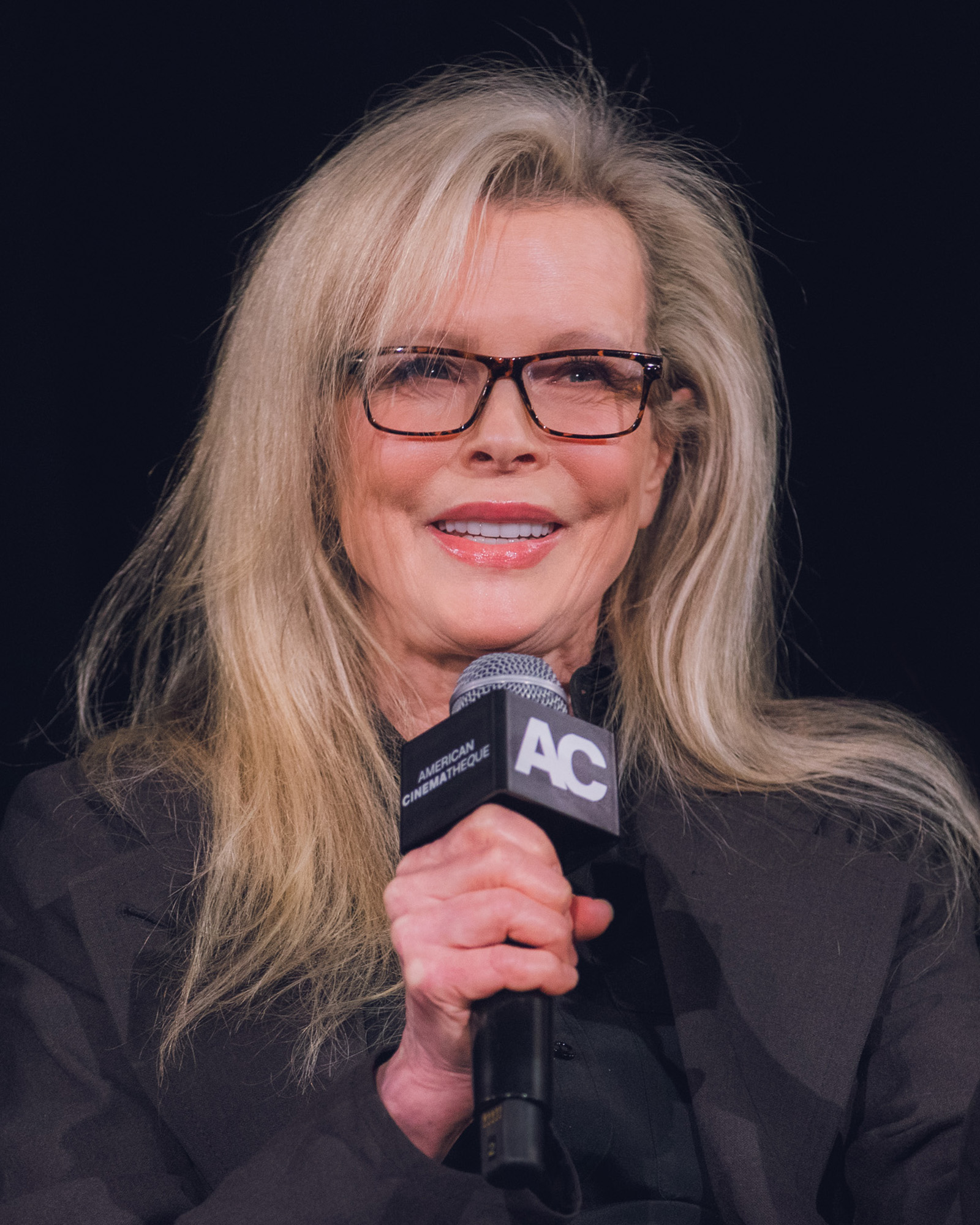
Kim Basinger, Best Supporting Actress winner

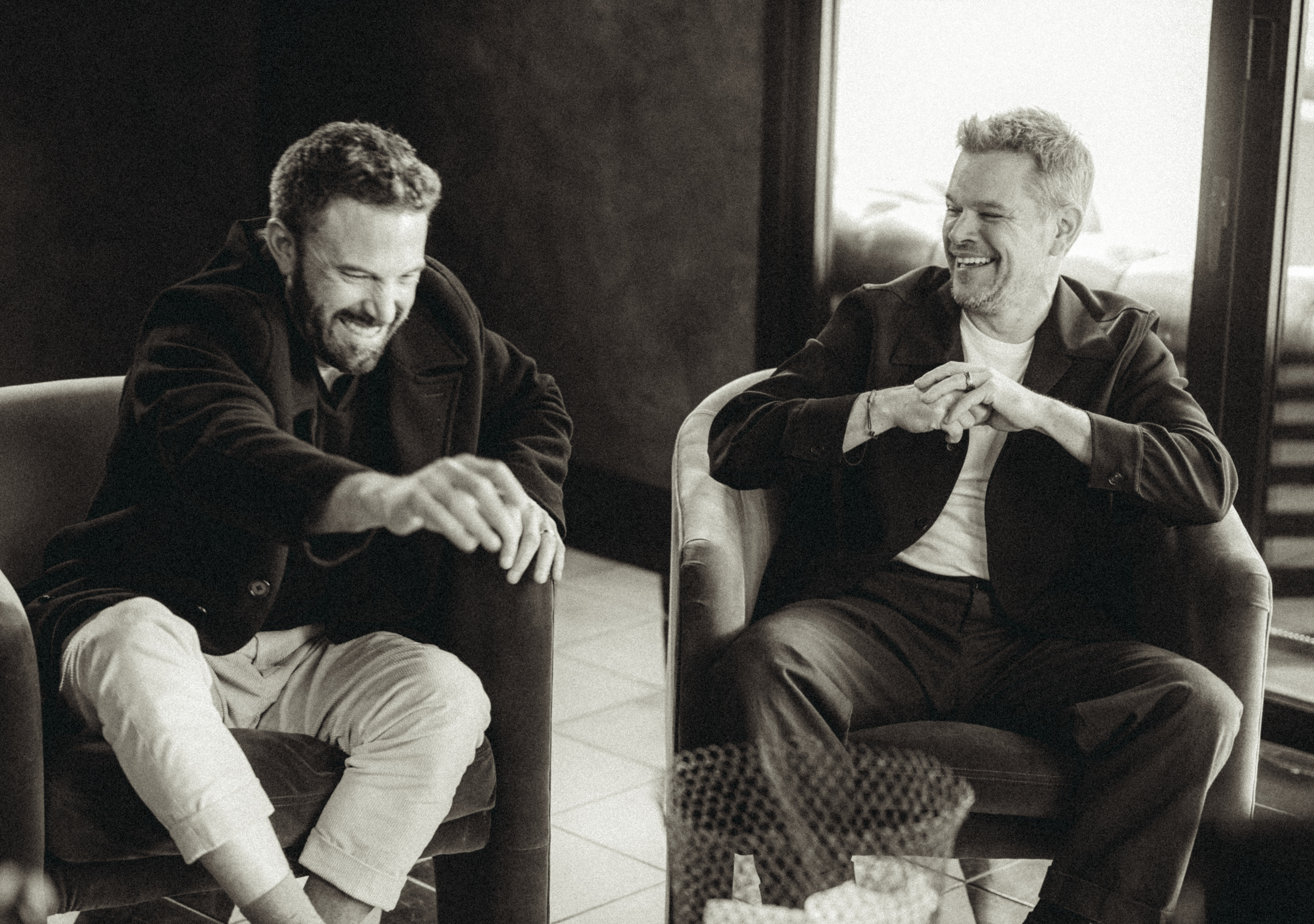
Ben Affleck (left) and Matt Damon, Best Screenplay Written Directly for the Screen winners

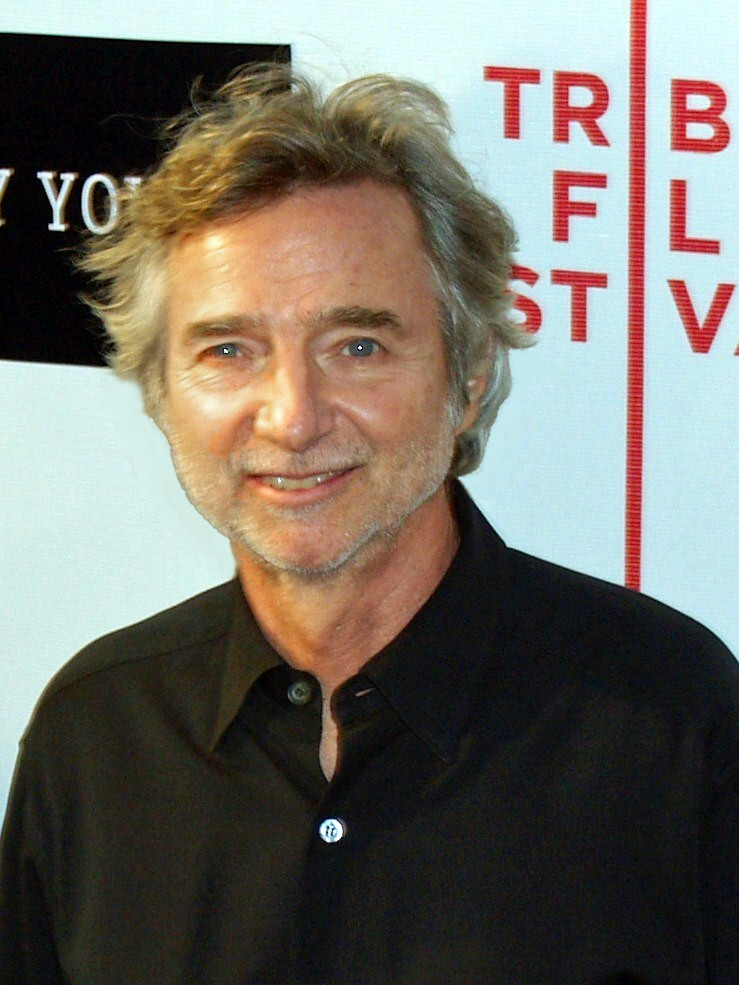
Curtis Hanson, Best Screenplay Based on Material Previously Produced or Published co-winner

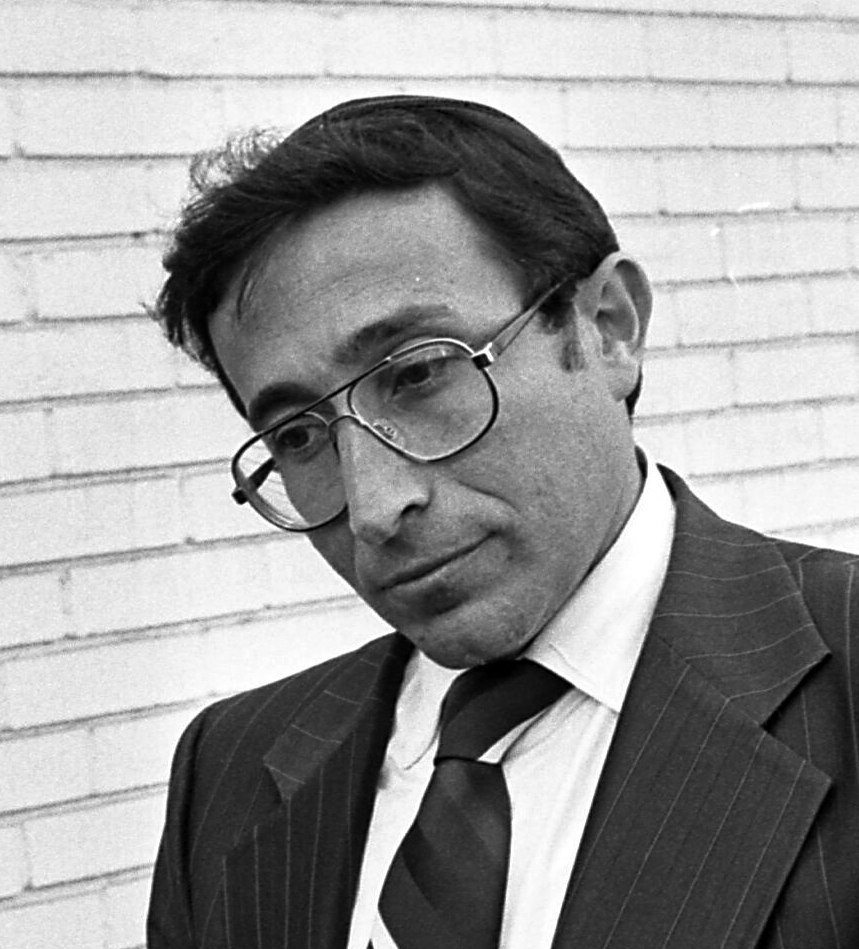
Marvin Hier, Best Documentary Feature winner

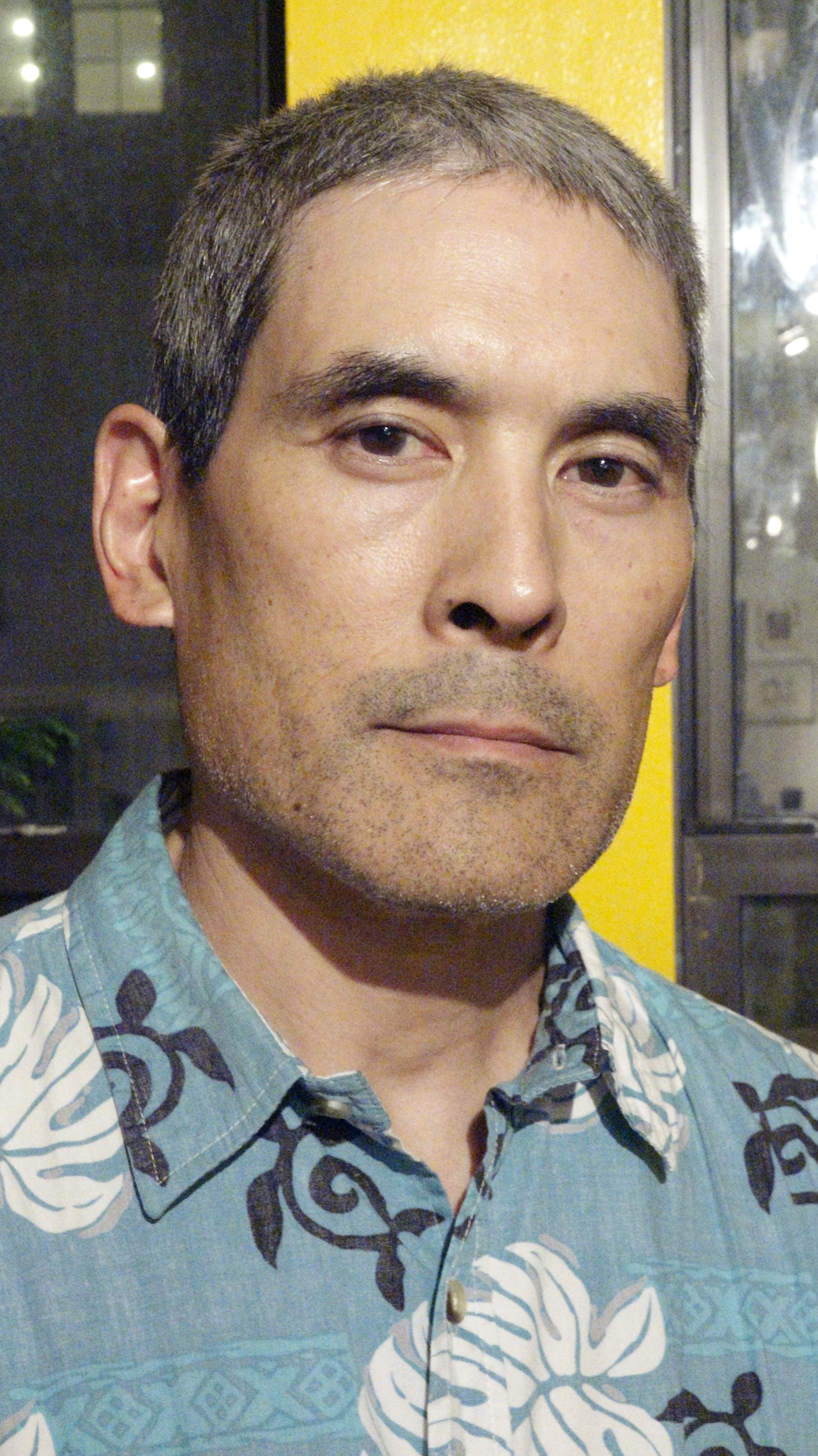
Chris Tashima, Best Live Action Short Film co-winner

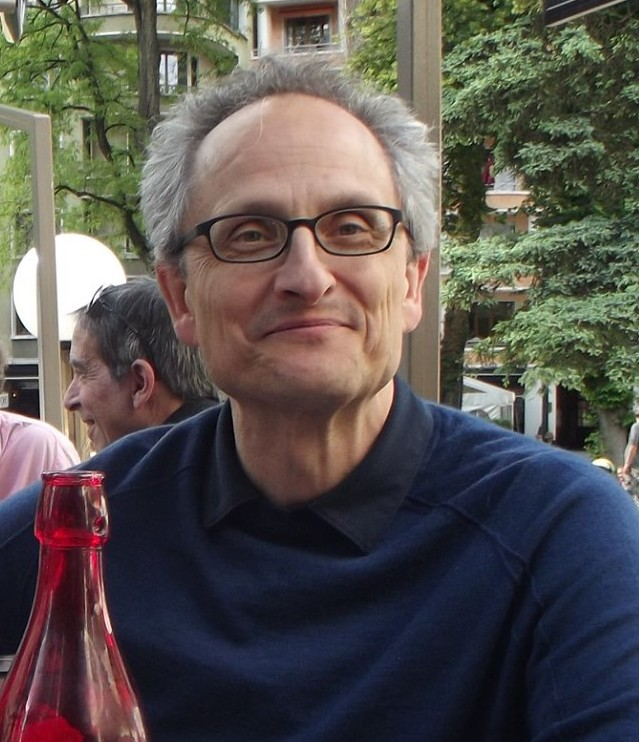
Jan Pinkava, Best Animated Short Film winner

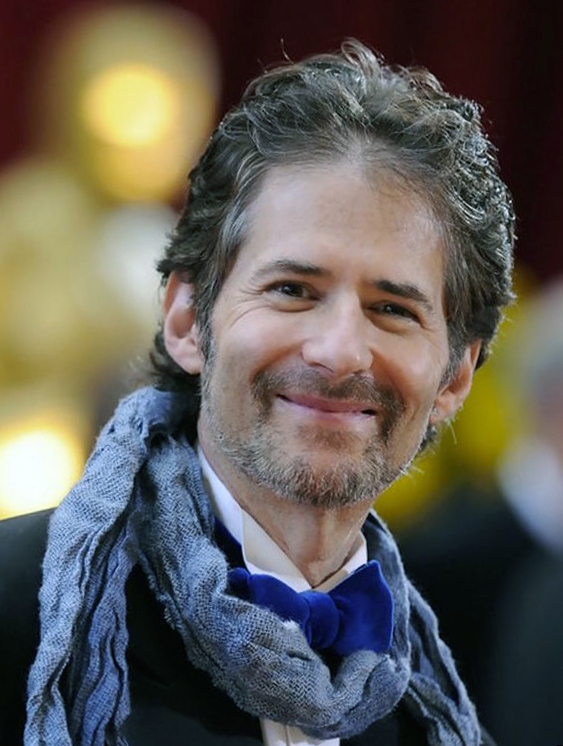
James Horner, Best Original Dramatic Score winner and Best Original Song co-winner

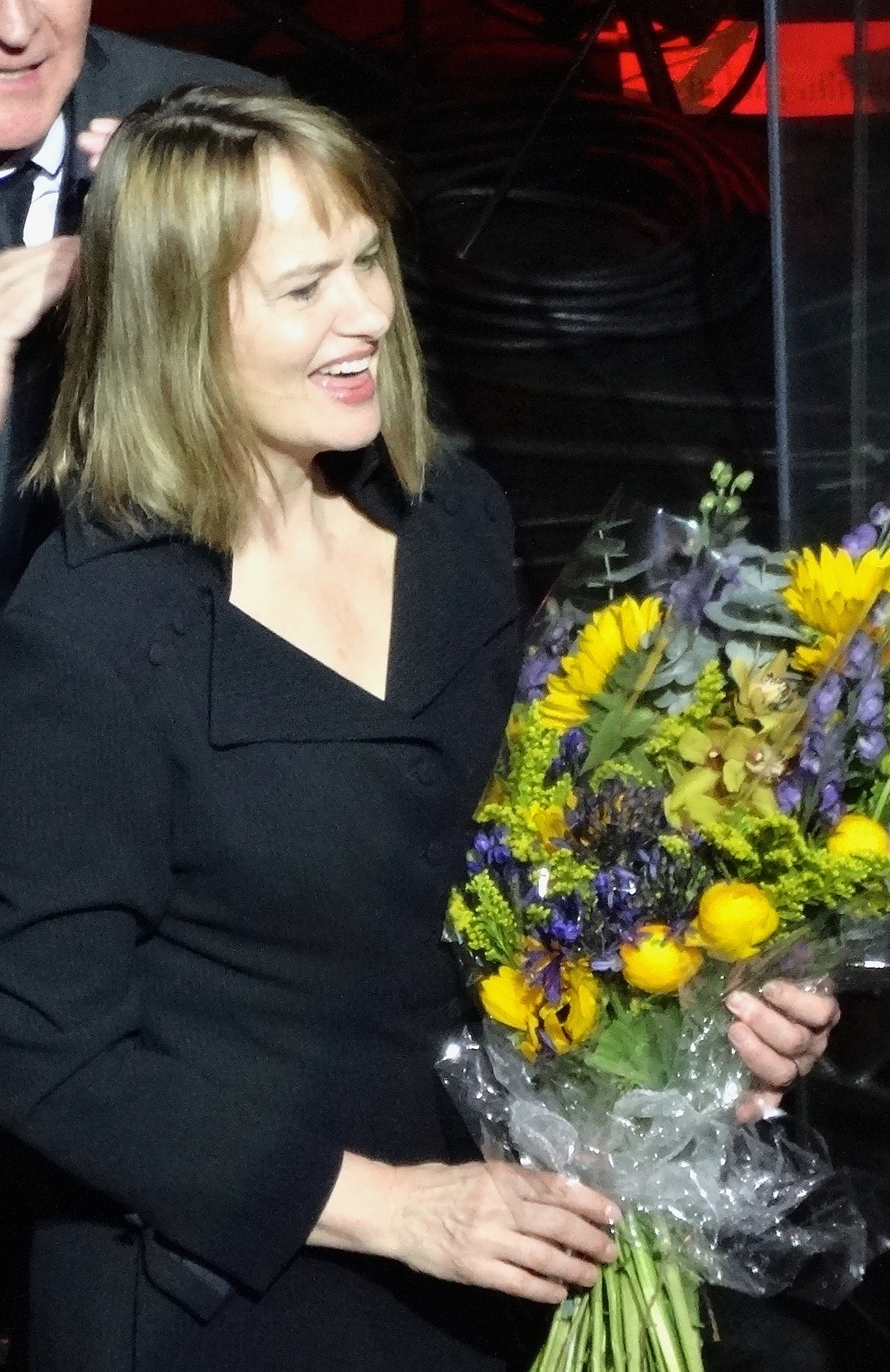
Anne Dudley, Best Original Musical or Comedy Score winner

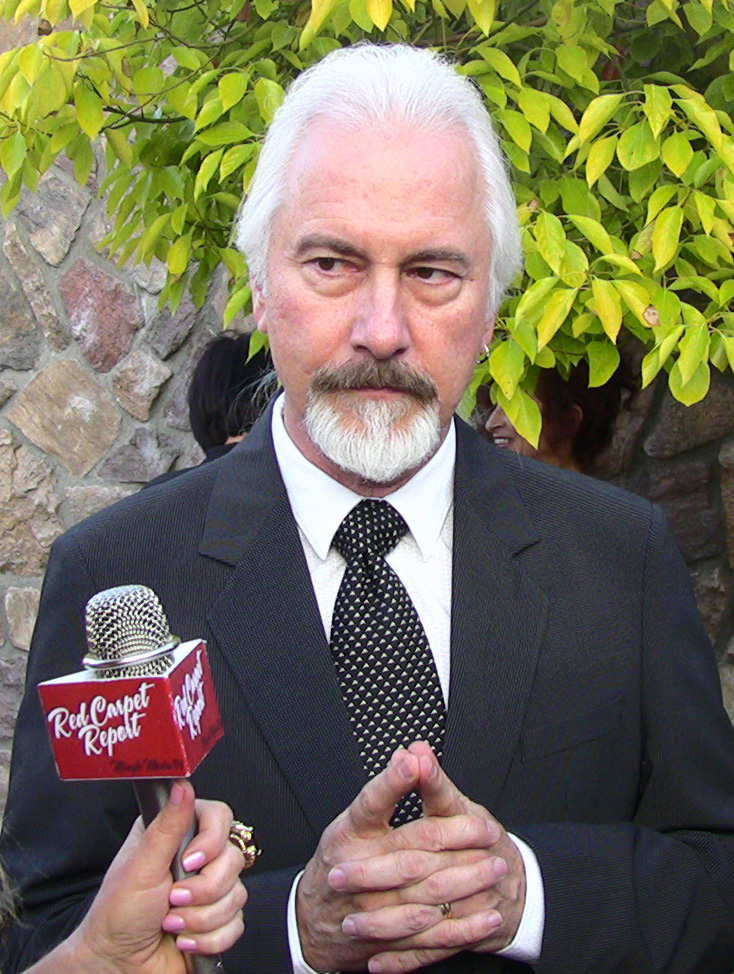
Rick Baker, Best Makeup co-winner

Winners are listed first, highlighted in boldface, and indicated with a double dagger (‡).

| **Best Picture**: **Titanic – James Cameron and Jon Landau, producers**‡; As Good as It Gets – James L. Brooks, Bridget Johnson and Kristi Zea, producers; The Full Monty – Uberto Pasolini, producer; Good Will Hunting – Lawrence Bender, producer; L.A. Confidential – Arnon Milchan, Curtis Hanson and Michael Nathanson, producers | **Best Directing**: **James Cameron – Titanic**‡; Peter Cattaneo – The Full Monty; Gus Van Sant – Good Will Hunting; Curtis Hanson – L.A. Confidential; Atom Egoyan – The Sweet Hereafter |
| **Best Actor in a Leading Role**: **Jack Nicholson – As Good as It Gets as Melvin Udall**‡; Matt Damon – Good Will Hunting as Will Hunting; Robert Duvall – The Apostle as Euliss "Sonny" Dewey, a.k.a. "The Apostle E.F."; Peter Fonda – Ulee's Gold as Ulysses "Ulee" Jackson; Dustin Hoffman – Wag the Dog as Stanley Motss | **Best Actress in a Leading Role**: **Helen Hunt – As Good as It Gets as Carol Connelly**‡; Helena Bonham Carter – The Wings of the Dove as Kate Croy; Julie Christie – Afterglow as Phyllis Mann; Judi Dench – Mrs Brown as Queen Victoria; Kate Winslet – Titanic as Rose DeWitt Bukater |
| **Best Actor in a Supporting Role**: **Robin Williams – Good Will Hunting as Dr. Sean Maguire**‡; Robert Forster – Jackie Brown as Max Cherry; Anthony Hopkins – Amistad as John Quincy Adams; Greg Kinnear – As Good as It Gets as Simon Bishop; Burt Reynolds – Boogie Nights as Jack Horner | **Best Actress in a Supporting Role**: **Kim Basinger – L.A. Confidential as Lynn Bracken**‡; Joan Cusack – In & Out as Emily Montgomery; Minnie Driver – Good Will Hunting as Skylar; Julianne Moore – Boogie Nights as Amber Waves/Maggie; Gloria Stuart – Titanic as Rose Dawson Calvert |
| **Best Writing (Screenplay Written Directly for the Screen)**: **Good Will Hunting – Matt Damon and Ben Affleck**‡; As Good as It Gets – Screenplay by Mark Andrus and James L. Brooks; Story by Mark Andrus; Boogie Nights – Paul Thomas Anderson; Deconstructing Harry – Woody Allen; The Full Monty – Simon Beaufoy | **Best Writing (Screenplay Based on Material Previously Produced or Published)**: **L.A. Confidential – Brian Helgeland and Curtis Hanson; from the novel by James Ellroy**‡; Donnie Brasco – Paul Attanasio; based on the book Donnie Brasco: My Undercover Life in the Mafia by Joseph D. Pistone with Richard Woodley; The Sweet Hereafter – Atom Egoyan; adapted from the novel by Russell Banks; Wag the Dog – David Mamet and Hilary Henkin; from the novel American Hero by Larry Beinhart; The Wings of the Dove – Hossein Amini; adapted from the novel by Henry James |
| **Best Foreign Language Film**: **Character (Netherlands) in Dutch – Mike van Diem**‡; Beyond Silence (Germany) in German – Caroline Link; Four Days in September (Brazil) in Portuguese – Bruno Barreto; Secrets of the Heart (Spain) in Spanish – Montxo Armendáriz; The Thief (Russia) in Russian – Pavel Chukhray | **Best Documentary (Feature)**: **The Long Way Home – Rabbi Marvin Hier and Richard Trank**‡; 4 Little Girls – Spike Lee and Sam Pollard; Ayn Rand: A Sense of Life – Michael Paxton; Colors Straight Up – Michèle Ohayon and Julia Schachter; Waco: The Rules of Engagement – Dan Gifford and William Gazecki |
| **Best Documentary (Short Subject)**: **A Story of Healing – Donna Dewey and Carol Pasternak**‡; Alaska: Spirit of the Wild – George Casey and Paul Novros; Amazon – Kieth Merrill and Jonathan Stern; Family Video Diaries: Daughter of the Bride – Terri Randall; Still Kicking: The Fabulous Palm Springs Follies – Mel Damski and Andrea Blaugrund Nevins | **Best Short Film (Live Action)**: **Visas and Virtue – Chris Tashima and Chris Donahue**‡; Dance Lexie Dance – Pearse Moore and Tim Loane; It's Good to Talk – Roger Goldby and Barney Reisz; Sweethearts? – Birger Larsen and Thomas Lydholm; Wolfgang – Anders Thomas Jensen and Kim Magnusson |
| **Best Short Film (Animated)**: **Geri's Game – Jan Pinkava**‡; Famous Fred – Joanna Quinn; The Old Lady and the Pigeons – Sylvain Chomet; Redux Riding Hood – Steve Moore and Dan O'Shannon; Rusalka – Alexander Petrov | **Best Music (Original Dramatic Score)**: **Titanic – James Horner**‡; Amistad – John Williams; Good Will Hunting – Danny Elfman; Kundun – Philip Glass; L.A. Confidential – Jerry Goldsmith |
| **Best Music (Original Musical or Comedy Score)**: **The Full Monty – Anne Dudley**‡; Anastasia – Music by Stephen Flaherty; lyrics by Lynn Ahrens; orchestral score by David Newman; As Good as It Gets – Hans Zimmer; Men in Black – Danny Elfman; My Best Friend's Wedding – James Newton Howard | **Best Music (Original Song)**: **"My Heart Will Go On" from Titanic – Music by James Horner; lyrics by Will Jennings**‡; "Go the Distance" from Hercules – Music by Alan Menken; lyrics by David Zippel; "How Do I Live" from Con Air – Music and lyrics by Diane Warren; "Journey to the Past" from Anastasia – Music by Stephen Flaherty; lyrics by Lynn Ahrens; "Miss Misery" from Good Will Hunting – Music and lyrics by Elliott Smith |
| **Best Sound**: **Titanic – Gary Rydstrom, Tom Johnson, Gary Summers and Mark Ulano**‡; Air Force One – Paul Massey, Rick Kline, Doug Hemphill and Keith A. Wester; Con Air – Kevin O'Connell, Greg P. Russell and Art Rochester; Contact – Randy Thom, Tom Johnson, Dennis S. Sands and William B. Kaplan; L.A. Confidential – Andy Nelson, Anna Behlmer and Kirk Francis | **Best Sound Effects Editing**: **Titanic – Christopher Boyes and Tom Bellfort**‡; Face/Off – Mark P. Stoeckinger and Per Hallberg; The Fifth Element – Mark Mangini |
| **Best Art Direction**: **Titanic – Art Direction: Peter Lamont; Set Decoration: Michael D. Ford**‡; Gattaca – Art Direction: Jan Roelfs; Set Decoration: Nancy Nye; Kundun – Art Direction: Dante Ferretti; Set Decoration: Francesca Lo Schiavo; L.A. Confidential – Art Direction: Jeannine Oppewall; Set Decoration: Jay Hart; Men in Black – Art Direction: Bo Welch; Set Decoration: Cheryl Carasik | **Best Cinematography**: **Titanic – Russell Carpenter**‡; Amistad – Janusz Kamiński; Kundun – Roger Deakins; L.A. Confidential – Dante Spinotti; The Wings of the Dove – Eduardo Serra |
| **Best Makeup**: **Men in Black – Rick Baker and David LeRoy Anderson**‡; Mrs Brown – Lisa Westcott, Veronica Brebner and Beverley Binda; Titanic – Tina Earnshaw, Greg Cannom and Simon Thompson | **Best Costume Design**: **Titanic – Deborah Lynn Scott**‡; Amistad – Ruth E. Carter; Kundun – Dante Ferretti; Oscar and Lucinda – Janet Patterson; The Wings of the Dove – Sandy Powell |
| **Best Film Editing**: **Titanic – Conrad Buff, James Cameron and Richard A. Harris**‡; Air Force One – Richard Francis-Bruce; As Good as It Gets – Richard Marks; Good Will Hunting – Pietro Scalia; L.A. Confidential – Peter Honess | **Best Visual Effects**: **Titanic – Robert Legato, Mark Lasoff, Thomas L. Fisher and Michael Kanfer**‡; The Lost World: Jurassic Park – Dennis Muren, Stan Winston, Randal M. Dutra and Michael Lantieri; Starship Troopers – Phil Tippett, Scott E. Anderson, Alec Gillis and John Richardson |

=== Honorary Award ===
- To Stanley Donen in appreciation of a body of work marked by grace, elegance, wit and visual innovation.

=== Films with multiple nominations and awards ===
The following 16 films received multiple nominations:

| Nominations | Film |
|---|---|
| 14 | Titanic |
| 9 | Good Will Hunting |
| 9 | L.A. Confidential |
| 7 | As Good as It Gets |
| 4 | Amistad |
| 4 | The Full Monty |
| 4 | Kundun |
| 4 | The Wings of the Dove |
| 3 | Boogie Nights |
| 3 | Men in Black |
| 2 | Air Force One |
| 2 | Anastasia |
| 2 | Con Air |
| 2 | Mrs Brown |
| 2 | The Sweet Hereafter |
| 2 | Wag the Dog |

The following four films received multiple awards:

| Awards | Film |
|---|---|
| 11 | Titanic |
| 2 | As Good as It Gets |
| 2 | Good Will Hunting |
| 2 | L.A. Confidential |

== Presenters and performers ==
The following individuals presented awards or performed musical numbers.

=== Presenters ===
| Name(s) | Role |
|---|---|
| Norman Rose | Announcer for the 70th annual Academy Awards |
| Robert Rehme (AMPAS President) | Gave opening remarks welcoming guests to the awards ceremony |
| Cuba Gooding Jr. | Presenter of the award for Best Supporting Actress |
| Elisabeth Shue | Presenter of the award for Best Costume Design |
| Dustin Hoffman | Presenter of the 70 years of Best Picture winners montage |
| Neve Campbell | Presenter of the performances of Best Original Song nominees "Journey to the Past" and "Go the Distance" |
| Arnold Schwarzenegger | Presenter of the film Titanic on the Best Picture segment |
| Mira Sorvino | Presenter of the award for Best Supporting Actor |
| Cameron Diaz | Presenter of the award for Best Sound |
| Mike Myers | Presenter of the award for Sound Effects Editing |
| Helen Hunt | Presenter of the award for Best Visual Effects |
| Fay Wray | Introducer of presenters Ben Affleck and Matt Damon |
| Ben Affleck; Matt Damon | Presenters of the awards for Best Live Action Short Film and Best Animated Short Film |
| Geoffrey Rush | Presenter of the award for Best Actress |
| Antonio Banderas | Presenter of the award for Best Original Dramatic Score |
| Jennifer Lopez | Introducer of the special dance number to the tune of the nominees for Best Original Musical or Comedy Score and presenter of the award for Best Original Musical or Comedy Score |
| Drew Barrymore | Presenter of the award for Best Makeup |
| Alec Baldwin | Presenter of the film L.A. Confidential on the Best Picture segment |
| Samuel L. Jackson | Presenter of the award for Best Film Editing |
| Ashley Judd | Presenter of the segment of the Academy Awards for Technical Achievement and the Gordon E. Sawyer Award |
| Martin Scorsese | Presenter of the Honorary Academy Award to Stanley Donen |
| Matt Dillon | Presenter of the film Good Will Hunting on the Best Picture segment |
| Madonna | Introducer of the performances of Best Original Song nominees "How Do I Live", "Miss Misery" and "My Heart Will Go On" and presenter of the award for Best Original Song |
| Djimon Hounsou | Presenter of the Best Documentary Short |
| Robert De Niro | Presenter of the Best Documentary Feature |
| Whoopi Goldberg | Presenter of the "In Memoriam" tribute |
| Meg Ryan | Presenter of the award for Best Art Direction |
| Robin Williams | Presenter of the 70 Years of Oscars montage |
| Frances McDormand | Presenter of the award for Best Actor |
| Sharon Stone | Presenter of the award for Best Foreign Language Film |
| Jack Lemmon; Walter Matthau | Presenters of the awards for Best Screenplay Based on Material Previously Produced or Published and Best Original Screenplay/Screenplay Written Directly for the Screen |
| Geena Davis | Presenter of the film The Full Monty on the Best Picture segment |
| Denzel Washington | Presenter of the award for Best Cinematography |
| Susan Sarandon | Presenter of the Oscar Family Album segment |
| Sigourney Weaver | Presenter of the film As Good as It Gets on the Best Picture segment |
| Warren Beatty | Presenter of the award for Best Director |
| Sean Connery | Presenter of the award for Best Picture |

=== Performers ===
| Name(s) | Role | Performed |
|---|---|---|
| Jerry Goldsmith | Composer | "Fanfare for Oscar" |
| Bill Conti | Musical arranger | Orchestral |
| Billy Crystal | Performer | Opening number: Titanic (to the tune of "The Ballad of Gilligan's Isle" from Gilligan's Island), As Good as It Gets (to the tune of "Let's Call the Whole Thing Off" from Shall We Dance), Good Will Hunting (to the tune of "Night and Day" from The Gay Divorcee), L.A. Confidential (to the tune of "Fascinating Rhythm" by George Gershwin) and The Full Monty (to the tune "Hello, Dolly!" from Hello, Dolly!) |
| Michael Bolton | Performer | "Go the Distance" from Hercules |
| Aaliyah | Performer | "Journey to the Past" from Anastasia |
| Trisha Yearwood | Performer | "How Do I Live" from Con Air |
| Elliott Smith | Performer | "Miss Misery" from Good Will Hunting |
| Celine Dion | Performer | "My Heart Will Go On" from Titanic |

== Ceremony information ==
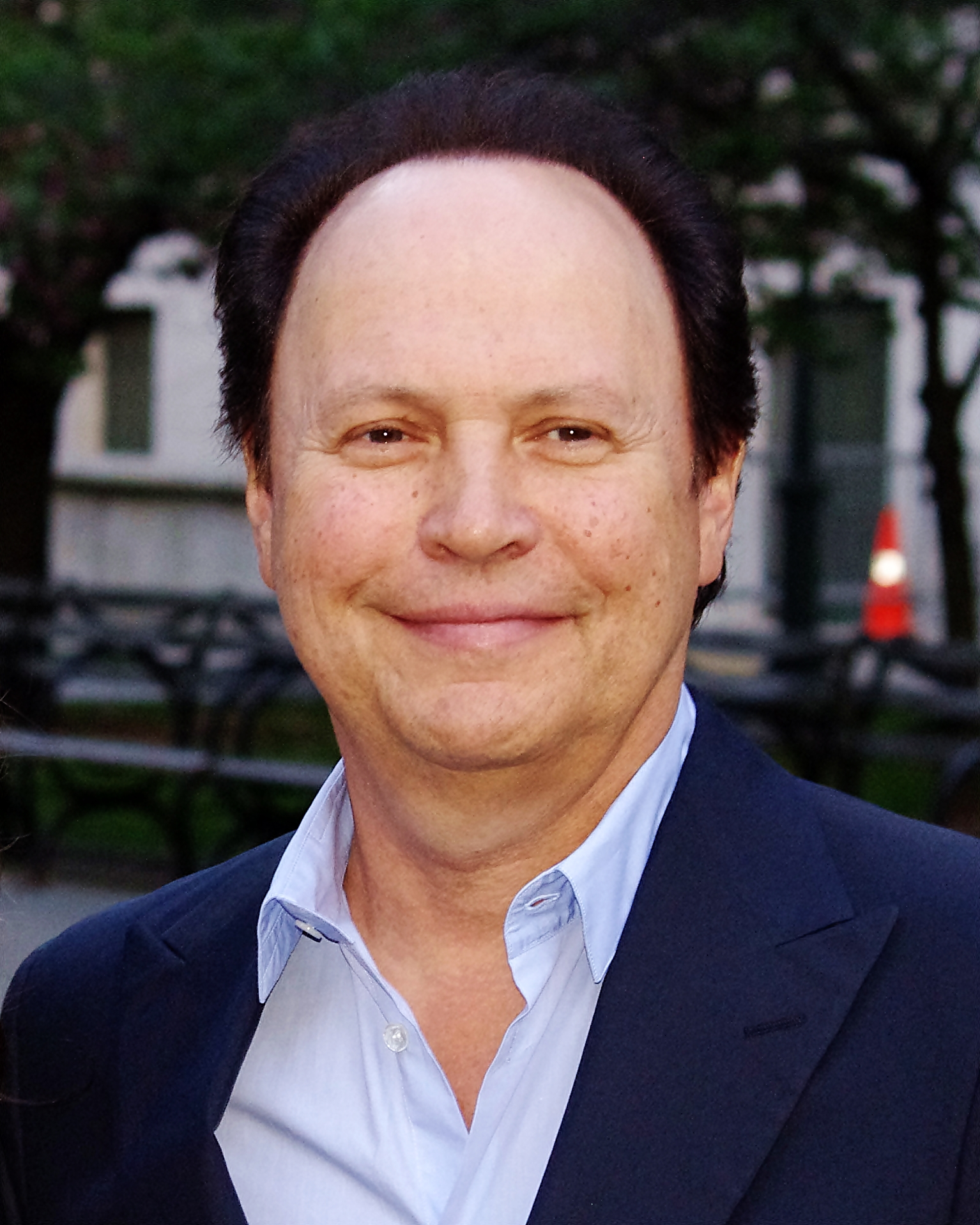
Billy Crystal hosted the 70th Academy Awards.

In December 1997, the academy hired veteran Oscar telecast producer Gil Cates to oversee the 1998 ceremony. "Gil has become the consummate Oscar show producer, consistently garnering top television ratings for the telecast," said AMPAS President Robert Rehme in a press release announcing the selection. "His shows are full of wit, charm and surprise." A few days later, actor and comedian Billy Crystal was chosen to emcee the upcoming telecast. Cates explained his reason to bring back the veteran comedian saying, "Billy's performance last year was spectacular. There is nobody like him." In an article published in USA Today he initially requested to Cates and AMPAS five months after the previous year's ceremony that he would like to take a break from hosting duties. However, pressure from the academy, Cates, and several friends and family members made him reconsider his decision. His sixth stint would make him second only to Bob Hope in number of ceremonies hosted. For the first time, the show was procuded by AMPAS, not ABC, because of the failure in reaching a contract agreement with the National Association of Broadcast Employees and Technicians.

To commemorate the seventieth anniversary of the Academy Awards, 70 actors who have received both competitive and honorary awards appeared seated onstage together during a segment called Oscar's Family Album. Each former winner was acknowledged by announcer Norman Rose with the films he or she won for. At the end of the segment newly minted winners Kim Basinger, Helen Hunt, and Robin Williams joined them. This marked the largest gathering of former winners since the 50th ceremony held in 1978. The Academy also commissioned musician and composer Jerry Goldsmith to compose a new leitmotif for the Oscars telecast entitled "Fanfare for Oscar".

Several others participated in the production of the ceremony. Bill Conti served as musical director for the telecast. Dancer Daniel Ezralow choreographed a dance number showcasing the nominees for Best Original Comedy or Musical Score. Bart the Bear made a surprise appearance during the presentation of the Best Sound Effects Editing award with Mike Myers.

=== Box office performance of nominees ===
At the time of the nominations announcement on February 10, the combined gross of the five Best Picture nominees was $579 million with an average of $116 million per film. Titanic was the highest earner among the Best Picture nominees with $338.7 million in domestic box office receipts. The film was followed by As Good as It Gets ($92.6 million), Good Will Hunting ($68.9 million), L.A. Confidential ($39.7 million), and finally The Full Monty ($38.7 million).

Of the top 50 grossing movies of the year, 40 nominations went to 15 films on the list. Only Titanic (1st), As Good as It Gets (16th), Good Will Hunting (20th), and In & Out (24th) were nominated for directing, acting, screenwriting, or Best Picture. The other top 50 box office hits that earned nominations were Men in Black (2nd), The Lost World: Jurassic Park (3rd), Air Force One (5th), My Best Friends Wedding (7th), Face/Off (9th), Con Air (12th), Contact (13th), Hercules (14th), The Fifth Element (25th), Anastasia (30th), and Starship Troopers (34th).

=== Critical response ===
The show received a positive reception from most media publications. Television critic Howard Rosenberg of the Los Angeles Times lauded Crystal's performance writing that he "would earn top billing as that unusual comedian as artful at doing musical comedy as jokes." San Francisco Chronicle columnist John Carman raved,"It was the best Oscar show in two decades." He also gave high marks for the host, commenting, "But last night, Crystal was back in razor form." The Seattle Times television editor Kay McFadden praised Crystal commenting that "he possesses nearly impeccable timing and judgment." In addition, she noted that while the ceremony dragged on, "Last night was one of television's smartest live ceremonies in recent memory."

Some media outlets were more critical of the show. Ray Richmond of Variety complained that the ceremony proved to be a "Yawner of an Oscarcast." He added that Crystal's "off-the-cuff one-liners sank faster than the great ship herself." Boston Globe television critic Matthew Gilbert bemoaned,"There was hardly a spontaneous moment during last night's Oscarcast." Film critic Carrie Rickey from The Philadelphia Inquirer lamented that the inevitable Titanic sweep "sank a telecast loaded with montages of previous years' Oscar highlights."

=== Ratings and reception ===
The American telecast on ABC drew in an average of 57.25 million people over its length, which was a 29% increase from the previous year's ceremony. An estimated 87.50 million total viewers watched all or part of the awards. The show also earned higher Nielsen ratings compared to the previous ceremony with 35.32% of households watching over a 55.77 share. In addition, it garnered a higher 18–49 demo rating with a 24.90 rating over a 44.30 share among viewers in that demographic. It was the most watched Oscar ceremony in television history since viewership figures were compiled beginning with the 46th ceremony in 1974.

In July 1998, the ceremony presentation received eight nominations at the 50th Primetime Emmys. Two months later, the ceremony won five of those nominations for Outstanding Individual Performance in a Variety or Music Program (Billy Crystal), Outstanding Directing for a Variety or Music Program (Louis J Horvitz), Outstanding Lighting Direction (Electronic) for a Drama Series, Variety Series, Miniseries, or Movie (Bob Barnhart, Robert Dickinson, Matt Ford, Andy O'Reilly), Outstanding Music Direction (Bill Conti), and Outstanding Sound Mixing for a Variety Series or Special (Patrick Baltzell, Robert Douglass, Edward J. Greene, Tommy Vicari).

== "In Memoriam" ==
The annual "In Memoriam" tribute was presented by actress Whoopi Goldberg. The montage featured an excerpt of "Appassionata" from The Passage composed by Michael J. Lewis.

- Lloyd Bridges - Actor
- Richard Jaeckel - Character actor
- Saul Chaplin – Composer/Musical Director
- Stanley Cortez – Cinematographer
- William Hickey - Actor
- Paul Jarrico – Screenwriter
- Dorothy Kingsley – Screenwriter
- Sydney Guilaroff – Hairstylist
- William H. Reynolds – Editor
- Billie Dove - Actress
- Jacques Cousteau – Filmmaker
- Stubby Kaye - Actor, comedian
- Red Skelton - Comedy entertainer
- Dawn Steel – Executive
- Toshiro Mifune - Japanese actor
- Brian Keith - Actor
- Chris Farley - Actor, comedian
- Leo Jaffe – Executive
- Samuel Fuller – Director
- Burgess Meredith - Actor
- J. T. Walsh - Character actor
- Robert Mitchum - Actor
- James Stewart - Actor

== See also ==
- 4th Screen Actors Guild Awards
- 18th Golden Raspberry Awards
- 40th Grammy Awards
- 51st British Academy Film Awards
- 52nd Tony Awards
- 55th Golden Globe Awards
- List of submissions to the 70th Academy Awards for Best Foreign Language Film

== Bibliography ==
- Bona, Damien (2002), Inside Oscar 2, New York, United States: Ballantine Books, ISBN 0-345-44970-3
- Osborne, Robert (2008). 80 Years of the Oscar: The Complete History of the Academy Awards. New York, United States: Abbeville Publishing Group. ISBN 978-0-7892-0992-4.
- Pond, Steve (2005), The Big Show: High Times and Dirty Dealings Backstage at the Academy Awards, New York, United States: Faber and Faber, ISBN 0-571-21193-3
- Symons, Mitchell (2004), That Book ...of Perfectly Useless Information, New York, United States: HarperCollins, ISBN 978-0-06-073254-7
