= Bombardier (film) =

1943 film by Richard Wallace and Lambert Hillyer

- Theatrical release poster
- Directed by: Richard Wallace
- Written by: John Twist; Martin Rackin
- Produced by: Robert Fellows
- Starring: Pat O'Brien; Randolph Scott; Anne Shirley; Eddie Albert
- Cinematography: Nicholas Musuraca
- Edited by: Robert Wise
- Music by: Roy Webb
- Distributed by: RKO Pictures
- Release date: May 14, 1943
- Running time: 99 minutes
- Country: United States
- Language: English
- Box office: $2 million (US rentals)

Bombardier is a 1943 film war drama about the training program for bombardiers of the United States Army Air Forces. The film stars Pat O'Brien and Randolph Scott. Bombardier was nominated for an Oscar in 1944 for the special effects used in the film. It was largely filmed at Kirtland Army Air Field, New Mexico, site of the first bombardier training school.

The film follows the training of six bombardier candidates, seen through the differences between the two USAAF pilots in charge of their training over the efficacy of precision bombing.

Brigadier General Eugene L. Eubank, commander of the first heavy bombardment group of the U.S. Army Air Forces to see combat in World War II, introduces the film with the statement:

I want you to know about a new kind of American soldier, the most important of all our fighting men today. He is most important because upon him, finally, depends the success of any mission in which he participates. The greatest bombing plane in the world, with its combat crew, takes him into battle, through weather, through enemy opposition, just so he may have 30 seconds over the target. In those 30 seconds, he must vindicate the greatest responsibility ever placed upon an individual soldier in line of duty. I want you to know about him, and about those who had the faith and vision and foresight to bring him into being, to fit him for his task, long months before our war began.

== Plot ==
Officers of the U.S. Army Air Corps debate the importance of bombardiers at a staff meeting in Washington, D.C., in 1941. Major "Chick" Davis argues that a bombardier, using the top secret American bombsight will be the "spearhead of our striking force." Captain "Buck" Oliver argues that new pilots are the priority. Davis challenges Oliver to a "bombing duel" to test their respective points of view. Oliver, using a dive bomber, misses the stationary target, while Davis, bombing from 20,000 feet in a Boeing B-17 Flying Fortress, hits his target with his first bomb.

As the first class nears graduation at a new bombardier training school, Davis arrives with Master Sergeant Archie Dixon to take command. Davis is discomfited by the presence of so many civilian women administrators, including Burton "Burt" Hughes, the daughter of a respected Air Corps general and now a secretary. The next cadet class arrives, including Oliver and Burt's brother Tom. Davis learns that Oliver and Burt have a romantic history and apologizes for his initial rudeness to her.

Preflight ground school reveals many shortcomings: Tom Hughes has trouble with fear-induced air sickness, Joe Connors with commitment issues, and "Chito" Rafferty with the lack of women on the base. Connors tells Davis that a spy wants to buy information from him about the secret bombsight, and they lure the spy into a trap where he is arrested. When a bomber crew must bail out from a plane with mechanical problems, Tom panics and refuses to jump. His friend, another suitor of Burt's, Cadet Jim Carter, crash-lands the aircraft, and claims he was the one who panicked. Hughes confesses afterward but successfully persuades Davis to give him a second chance.

On another flight, Oliver passes out from anoxia, nearly tossing Carter out of the opened bomb bay without a parachute. Tom falls to his death saving Carter's life. Guilt-stricken and unable to face Burt, Oliver transfers out of the school. Shortly after, America enters the war after the Japanese attack on Pearl Harbor. Davis, promoted to colonel, becomes a B-17 group commander, and awkwardly proposes marriage to Burt who turns him down. New bombardiers Carter, Connors, Rafferty, and Harris leave for a secret island base in the Pacific, and Burt passionately kisses Jim Carter goodbye, revealing her choice.

Oliver, now a major, joins the group and is assigned to a night mission to bomb an aircraft factory in Nagoya. Oliver is tasked with dropping incendiaries to set the target on fire a half hour before the arrival of the group, which Davis will lead at high altitude. Joe Connors is Oliver's bombardier and Sergeant Dixon his tailgunner. Flying low, Oliver's bomber is shot down before he can drop his bombs, and Connors remains at his post, sacrificing his life to destroy the bombsight.

Oliver's crew is captured. Their Japanese captors execute the other crew members to coerce Oliver and Dixon into revealing the location of their base, but Dixon overwhelms his guard and is machine gunned attempting to escape. The shots also set fire to a gasoline truck. Oliver drives the burning truck through the factory, setting fire to its camouflage netting and fulfills his mission, knowing he will be killed in the bomb raid. The B-17 group fights off Japanese fighters and successfully destroys the target.

== Cast ==
Brigadier General Eugene L. Eubank delivers the introductory statement to the film

- Brig. Gen. Eugene L. Eubank as himself
- Pat O'Brien as Major "Chick" Davis
- Randolph Scott as Captain "Buck" Oliver
- Anne Shirley as Burton "Burt" Hughes
- Eddie Albert as Cadet Tom Hughes
- Walter Reed as Cadet Jim Carter
- Robert Ryan as Cadet Joe Connors
- Barton MacLane as Master Sergeant Archie Dixon
- Leonard Strong as Japanese Officer
- Richard Martin as Cadet Ignacius "Chito" Rafferty (Note: Richard Martin made his first appearance as the Mexican Irish character "Chito" Rafferty that he would later play in many RKO Westerns opposite Tim Holt.)
- Russell Wade as Cadet Paul Harris
- John Miljan as Chaplain Charlie Craig
- Charles Russell as Instructor
- John Calvert as Calvert – The Magician (uncredited)

== Production ==
=== Development ===
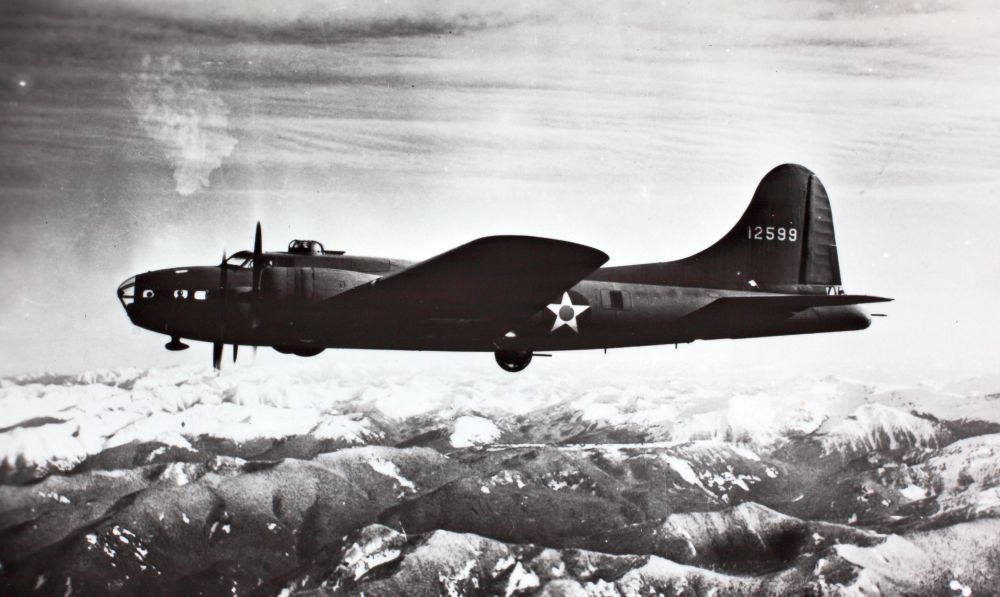
Early series Boeing B-17E Flying Fortresses featured prominently in Bombardier.

RKO Pictures began Bombardier as a project in 1940, with several rewrites to incorporate changes in world events. With full cooperation of the United States Army Air Forces, the film was in production from October 12 to December 18, 1942, with six weeks of the filming done on location at Kirtland Army Air Base. All the aviation cadets in training at the base were used as extras, and veteran aircrews assigned to the school as instructors flew the B-17s used in formation shots at the end of the film. At Kirtland, filming featured live action photography of training aircraft including Beech AT-11 Kansan trainers, as well as Boeing B-17C and E series Flying Fortresses, Consolidated B-24 Liberators, Douglas B-18 Bolos and North American B-25 Mitchell bombers. A Junkers Ju 87 and Vought SB2U Vindicator dive bombers are briefly seen at the beginning of the film. The production moved to Midland, Texas to film the Japanese bombing scenes.

=== Crew ===
Notable members of the film crew included Robert Wise as film editor, and Robert Aldrich as second assistant director. Lambert Hillyer directed filming (uncredited) of an aerial sequence, while Joseph F. Biroc completed the cinematography work begun and credited to Nicholas Musuraca.

=== Writing ===
The central conflict between competing points of view over the importance of specialized bombardier training in Bombardier reflected an actual doctrinal struggle within the U.S. Army Air Corps between 1939 and December 1941, when, as in the film, the proponents of specialized training won out. Three attempts at developing a school had been tried since July 1940 at Lowry Field, Colorado; Barksdale Field, Louisiana; and Ellington Field, Texas, before the permanent school was established at Kirtland by Col. John D. Ryan as the first step in meeting a wartime goal of training 30,000 bombardiers.

=== Sets ===
Albuquerque Army Air Base (renamed Kirtland in February 1942) was constructed from January to August 1941 on the site of the former Oxnard Field (a private airport) in Albuquerque, at which time the 19th Bomb Group (commanded in combat by Col. Eugene Eubank, who introduces the film) completed training for deployment to the Philippines. A permanent Bombardier Training School, the first of 10 in the southwest United States, opened in December 1941 at Albuquerque Army Air Base and eventually graduated more than 5,000 bombardiers.

== Reception ==
Bombardier premiered on May 14, 1943, at Kirtland AAB, (now Kirtland AFB). Despite a blistering review from Bosley Crowther, the film was well received by the public. In 1993, 50 years after its first release, a colorized version was released on VHS by Turner Home Entertainment.

=== Box office ===
Bombardier was popular with audiences and earned RKO a profit of $565,000.

=== Awards ===
Bombardier received an Academy Award nomination in 1944 for Best Special Effects: Vernon L. Walker (photographic), James G. Stewart and Roy Granville (sound). (Note: The award went to Crash Dive.)

=== Legacy ===
Bombardier featured a supporting character, the Mexican-American Chito played by Richard Martin. Chito was created by screenwriter Jack Wagner, who had been brought in to work on the screenplay. Chito proved so popular RKO used the character as a sidekick in a series of Westerns, notably with Tim Holt.

The Larry Beinhart novel American Hero, source material for the film Wag The Dog, posits that the film was the inspiration for the Operation Desert Storm videos of guided bombs falling down smokestacks and air vents.
