= George Gaynes =

American actor (1917–2016)

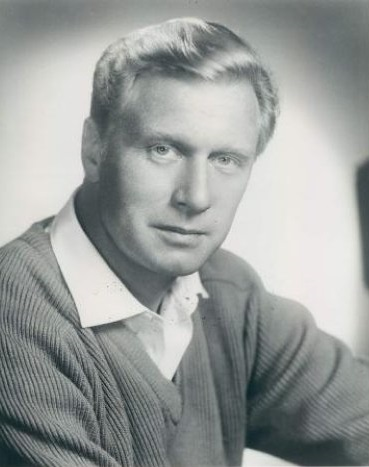
- George Gaynes in 1964
- Born: George Jongejans; May 16, 1917 [O.S. May 3] Helsinki, Grand Duchy of Finland, Russian Empire
- Died: February 15, 2016 (aged 98); North Bend, Washington, U.S.
- Occupations: Actor, singer
- Years active: 1940–2003
- Known for: Tootsie; Police Academy; Punky Brewster
- Spouse: Allyn Ann McLerie (m. 1953)
- Children: 2
- Parent(s): Gerrit Jongejans (father); Iya Grigorievna de Gay (mother)
- Relatives: Gregory Gaye (uncle)
- Military career
- Allegiance: The Netherlands
- Branch: Royal Netherlands Navy
- Service years: 1943–1946
- Rank: Sergeant
- Units: HNLMS Oranje Nassau; HMS Hilary; HMS Wilton
- Conflicts: World War II; Battle of the Atlantic; Mediterranean Theatre; Italian Campaign; Operation Husky; Battle of Anzio; Adriatic Campaign

George Gaynes (born George Jongejans; May 16, 1917 – February 15, 2016) was a Dutch-American singer, actor, and voice artist. Born to a Dutch father and a Russian mother in the Grand Duchy of Finland of the Russian Empire, he served in the Royal Netherlands Navy during World War II, and subsequently emigrated to the United States, where he became a citizen and began his acting career on Broadway.

Gaynes' most recognized roles in cinema were that of Commandant Eric Lassard in the Police Academy series and as John Van Horn in the 1982 comedy film Tootsie. He appeared as the curmudgeonly but lovable foster parent Henry Warnimont on the NBC series Punky Brewster; as high-powered theatrical producer Arthur Feldman on The Days and Nights of Molly Dodd; as Senator Strobe Smithers in the hit TV show Hearts Afire; and as Frank Smith, the mob boss brought down on the soap opera General Hospital.

== Early life ==
Gaynes was born on May 16, 1917, in Helsinki, in what was then the Grand Duchy of Finland, part of the Russian Empire (Finland became independent that year), the son of Iya Grigorievna de Gay (later known as Lady Abdy), a Russian artist, and Gerrit Jongejans, a Dutch businessman. His uncle was the actor Gregory Gaye. He was raised in France, England, and Switzerland.

Gaynes graduated from the Collège Classique Cantonal near Lausanne in 1937. He also attended the Music School of Milan from 1938 to 1939, and many many years later trained at the Actors Studio in New York City from 1953 to 1958.

== World War II ==
In 1940, Gaynes lived in France, but after the Battle of France and the German occupation, he escaped to the Pyrenees, but was soon arrested by the Francoist Spain police. In 1942 after his release, Gaynes intended to return to the Netherlands to join the Dutch resistance against the Nazi occupation, but instead made his way to the United Kingdom to enlist in the Royal Dutch Navy. On April 8, 1943, Gaynes was commissioned as a seaman recruit and assigned to the auxiliary ship HNLMS Oranje Nassau, which was stationed at Holyhead in Wales. Because of his multilingualism (he spoke Dutch, English, French, Italian, and Russian), he was detached on May 1, 1943, to the Royal Navy as a translator assigned to the convoy commodore aboard HMS Hilary, which participated during July and August 1943 in Operation Husky the Allied invasion of Sicily. On September 1, 1943, Gaynes was reassigned to the destroyer HMS Wilton, which participated during January 1944 in the Battle of Anzio. On January 1, 1944, he was promoted to sergeant (petty officer, 1st class). After the Battle of Anzio, HMS Wilton was assigned to the Adriatic Sea and continued to see action during the Adriatic Campaign. On July 14, 1946, Gaynes was honorably discharged from the Royal Dutch Navy.

== Career ==
In 1946, Gaynes returned to France, but an American theater director offered him a role in a Broadway musical and he moved to New York City later that year and became an American citizen in 1948. During this time, his best-known appearances were in Wonderful Town, the musical version of My Sister Eileen. Gaynes alternated between stage musicals and both comedic and dramatic plays, including his role as Bob Baker in the original production of Wonderful Town (1953), Jupiter in the Cole Porter musical Out of This World (credited as George Jongejans), Gilbert and Sullivan operettas, and as Henry Higgins in the 1964 U.S. tour of My Fair Lady.

Entering films and television in the early 1960s, Gaynes was a regular on the TV daytime dramas Search for Tomorrow (replacing Robert Mandan in the role of Jo's husband, Sam Reynolds) and General Hospital (originating the role of mobster Frank Smith), and showed up in such movies as The Group (1966), Marooned (1969), and Doctor's Wives (1971). He also appeared in the films The Way We Were (1973), Nickelodeon (1976), and Tootsie (1982). From 1984-1994, he played Commandant Eric Lassard, the titular leader, in the Police Academy series of movies. In 1994, he played Serybryalzov in Louis Malle's acclaimed independent feature, Vanya on 42nd Street. Later film appearances include The Crucible (1996), Wag the Dog (1997) and Just Married (2003).

On television, Gaynes played the role of Henry Warnimont, the eventual foster father for Punky Brewster in the TV series Punky Brewster from 1984-1988. He also provided the voice for Henry in the animated version of the show. He appeared as high-powered theatrical producer Arthur Feldman on The Days and Nights of Molly Dodd, in which Gaynes' real-life wife, Allyn Ann McLerie, co-starred as his love interest, and as Senator Strobe Smithers in the hit TV show Hearts Afire. He also appeared in one episode of the sci-fi television series Sliders as the old-aged version of Quinn Mallory, played by Jerry O'Connell. Behind the camera, he directed the last episode of WKRP in Cincinnati in 1982.

== Personal life and death ==
Gaynes was married to stage and television actress and dancer Allyn Ann McLerie from December 20, 1953, until his death; they had two children, Matthew Gaynes and Iya Gaynes Falcone Brown. Matthew was shortlisted for the US Olympic kayak team the year that President Jimmy Carter boycotted the 1980 Summer Olympics after the Soviet invasion of Afghanistan. Matthew died in a car crash in India in 1989 on his way to Nepal to film a kayaking special for ESPN.

In addition to Gaynes joining the cast of his wife's series The Days and Nights of Molly Dodd in 1989, McLerie and he had previously worked together on Punky Brewster, when she guest-starred in a first-season episode.

Gaynes died at his daughter's home in North Bend, Washington, on February 15, 2016, aged 98.

== Filmography ==
=== Film ===
Year	Title	Role	Notes
1963	PT 109	PT boat base commander	A biographical war film, which depicts the actions of John F. Kennedy (JFK) as an officer of the United States Navy in command of Motor Torpedo Boat PT-109, during the Pacific War of World War II (Uncredited)
1964	Les félins	Mr Taylor	
1966	The Group	Brook Latham	Ensemble film directed by Sidney Lumet, based on the novel of the same name by Mary McCarthy.
1969	Marooned	Mission Director	Eastmancolor film directed by John Sturges, based on the 1964 novel Marooned by Martin Caidin.
1971	Doctor's Wives	Paul McGill	drama film directed by George Schaefer.
1973	The Boy Who Cried Werewolf	Dr. Marderosian	Horror film directed by Nathan H. Juran.
1973	Slaughter's Big Rip-Off	Warren	Blaxploitation film directed by Gordon Douglas.
1973	The Way We Were	El Morocco Captain	Romantic-drama film directed by Sydney Pollack.
1976	Harry and Walter Go to New York	Prince	Period comedy film, written by John Byrum & Robert Kaufman and directed by Mark Rydell.
1976	Nickelodeon	Reginald Kingsley	Comedy film directed by Peter Bogdanovich.
1980	Altered States	Dr. Wissenschaft	Science fiction-horror film adaptation of a novel by the same name, by playwright and screenwriter Paddy Chayefsky.; The film was Chayefsky's only novel, while also being his final screenplay.; Both the novel and the film are based on John C. Lilly's sensory deprivation research conducted in isolation tanks under the influence of psychoactive drugs like mescaline, ketamine and LSD.
1982	Dead Men Don't Wear Plaid	Dr. John Hay Forrest	Comedy-mystery film directed by Carl Reiner.
1982	Tootsie	John Van Horn	Comedy film directed by Sydney Pollack.
1983	To Be or Not to Be	Ravitch	War comedy film, directed by Alan Johnson and produced by Mel Brooks.
1983	I'm Going to Be Famous	Angus	
1984	Police Academy	Cmdt. Eric Lassard	Comedy film directed by Hugh Wilson.
1984	Micki + Maude	Dr. Eugene Glztszki	Comedy film directed by Blake Edwards.
1985	Police Academy 2: Their First Assignment	Cmdt. Eric Lassard	Comedy film directed by Jerry Paris, and the first of six sequels in the Police Academy series.
1986	Police Academy 3: Back in Training	Cmdt. Eric Lassard	Comedy film directed by Jerry Paris, and the second of six sequels in the Police Academy series.
1987	The Numbers Game	Don Salvatore	Directed and co-written by Giancarlo Giannini.
1987	Police Academy 4: Citizens on Patrol	Cmdt. Eric Lassard	Comedy film directed by Jim Drake, and the third of six sequels in the Police Academy series.
1987	A Taxi Driver in New York	The Admiral	Italian film directed and co-written by Alberto Sordi.
1988	Police Academy 5: Assignment Miami Beach	Cmdt. Eric Lassard	Comedy film directed by Alan Myerson, and the fourth of six sequels in the Police Academy series.
1989	Police Academy 6: City Under Siege	Cmdt. Eric Lassard	Comedy film directed by Peter Bonerz, and the fifth of six sequels in the Police Academy series.
1994	Police Academy: Mission to Moscow	Cmdt. Eric Lassard	Comedy film directed by Alan Metter, and the final sequel in the Police Academy series.; Also known as Police Academy 7: Mission to Moscow.
1994	Vanya on 42nd Street	Serybryakov	An intimate, interpretive performance of the play Uncle Vanya by Anton Chekhov, as adapted by David Mamet and directed by Louis Malle.
1994	The Fantastic Four	Professor	An independent superhero film adapted from the Marvel Comics flagship title; unreleased.
1996	The Crucible	Judge Samuel Sewall	Drama film written by Arthur Miller adapting his play of the same title, inspired by the Salem witchcraft trials, and directed by Nicholas Hytner.
1997	Wag the Dog	Senator Cole	Black comedy film produced and directed by Barry Levinson.; Screenplay by Hilary Henkin and David Mamet was loosely adapted from Larry Beinhart's novel American Hero.
2003	Just Married	Father Robert	Romantic comedy film directed by Shawn Levy (final film role)

=== Television ===
Year	Title	Role	Notes
1962	Cheyenne	Rod Delaplane	Episode: "Vengeance is Mine"
1962	The Defenders	John Ames	Episode: "The Last Six Months" (S. 1: Ep. 27).
1962	Hawaiian Eye	Roger Korvin	Episode: "The Broken Thread" (S. 4: Ep. 4).
1962	The Alfred Hitchcock Hour	Mr. Campbell, the Bank Manager	Season 1 Episode 11: "Ride the Nightmare"
1963	Empire	N/A	Episode: "The Four Thumbs Story" (S. 1: Ep. 15).
1963	The Gallant Men	Major Neumann	Episode: "Operation Secret" (S. 1: Ep. 19).
1963	East Side/West Side	Mr. Stowe	Episode: "Who Do You Kill" (S. 1: Ep. 7).
1965	The Patty Duke Show	Gaylord	Episode: "The Perfect Hostess" (S. 2: Ep. 18).
1968	Bonanza	Purdy	Episode: "The Late Ben Cartwright" (S. 9: Ep. 22).
1968	Mannix	Professor Brendan	Episode: "Who Will Dig the Graves?" (S. 2: Ep. 8).
1968	Mission: Impossible	Dr. Paul van Bergner	Episode: "The Elixir" (S. 3: Ep. 7).
1970	Hawaii Five-O	Thurman Elliott	Episode: "Kiss the Queen Goodbye" (S. 2: Ep. 25).
1971	Hogan's Heroes	3 Star US Army Air Corp General	Episode: "Easy Come, Easy Go" (S. 6: Ep. 15).
1971	Search for Tomorrow	Sam Reynolds	Replacement for Robert Mandan.
1972	Columbo	Everett	Episode: "Étude in Black" (S. 2: Ep. 1).
1972	Search	Major Giles Matthews	Episode: "In Search of Midas" (S. 1: Ep. 8).
1973	Columbo	Frenchman	Episode: "Any Old Port in a Storm" (S. 3: Ep. 2).
1974	The Six Million Dollar Man	General Wiley	Episode: "Nuclear Alert" (S. 2: Ep. 1).
1974	Cannon	Edward Foxworth	Episode: "The Avenger" (S. 4: Ep. 7).
1974	McMillan & Wife	Burton Rohner	Episode: "Guilt by Association" (S. 4: Ep. 4).
1975	Trilogy of Terror	Dr. Chester Ramsey	Made-for-television anthology-horror film, first aired as an ABC Movie of the Week on March 4, 1975.; Directed by Dan Curtis.; Also known in the United States as Tales of Terror, or Terror of the Doll.
1975	McCloud	Floyd Spencer	Episode: "Fire!" (S. 6: Ep. 3).
1976	Captains and the Kings	Orestes Bradley	Made-for-TV-Movie
1976	City of Angels	Eisley	Episode: "Palm Springs Answer" (S. 1: Ep. 7).
1976	Rich Man, Poor Man Book II	Max Vincent	Miniseries
1976	Black Sheep Squadron	Gen. Chennault	Episodes: "Flying Misfits, part 1" (S. 1: Ep. 1).; "Flying Misfits, part 2" (S. 1: Ep. 2).
1976	The Quest	Gotham	Episode: "Day Of Outrage" (S. 1: Ep. 4).
1976	Delvecchio	Commissioner Schaub	Episode: "Hot Spell" (S. 1: Ep. 8).
1977	Washington: Behind Closed Doors	Brewster Perry	Miniseries
1977	Carter Country	Murdock	Episode: "Out of the Closet" (S. 1: Ep. 3).
1979	Quincy, M.E.	Airline Executive	Episode: "Aftermath" (S. 4: Ep. 16).
1979	Stockard Channing in Just Friends	Rock La Rue	Episode: "Health May Be Hazardous" (S. 1: Ep. 5).
1979	WKRP In Cincinnati	Henri	Episode: "Jennifer's Home For Christmas" (S. 1: Ep. 11).
1980	General Hospital	Frank Smith	Contract role
1980	Scruples	John Prince	TV Miniseries
1981	Evita Peron	Evita's Doctor	Made-for-TV-Movie directed by Marvin J. Chomsky.
1982	Quincy, M.E.	Powell Dixon	Episode: "The Unquiet Grave" (S. 7: Ep. 21).
1983	Cheers	Malcolm Kramer	Episode: "Where There's A Will" (S. 2: Ep. 12).
1984	Blue Thunder	Doctor Willi Von Hartig	Episode: "Payload" (S. 1: Ep. 8).
1984	ABC Afterschool Special	Cmdr. Arnold Arrangussen	Episode: "Mom's On Strike" (S. 13: Ep. 4)
1984–1988	Punky Brewster	Henry Warnimont	Contract role
1985–1986	It's Punky Brewster	Henry Warnimont (Voice)	26 episodes
1986	Hotel	Gerald Milburn	Episode: "Scapegoats" (S. 3: Ep. 12)
1987	Punky Brewster	Lars Warnimont	Episode: "It's a Dog's Life" (S. 3: Ep. 10).
1987	Matlock	Judge Hollis D. Dunaway	Episodes: "The Power Brokers, part 1" (S. 2: Ep. 5).; "The Power Brokers, part 2" (S. 2: Ep. 6).
1989	The New Lassie	Mr. Ogilvy	Episode: "Dangerous Party (a.k.a. Halloween)" (S. 1: Ep. 6).
1989–91	The Days and Nights of Molly Dodd	Arthur Feldman	Contract role
1992	Dinosaurs	Elder in Chief	Episode: "Nuts to War, part 2" (S. 2: Ep. 20).
1992–93	Hearts Afire	Senator Strobe Smithers	Contract role
1996	Chicago Hope	Brook Austin	Recurring role
1998	Police Academy: The Series	Cmdt. Eric Lassard	Episode: "Lend Me Your Ears" (S. 1: Ep. 15).
1999	Sliders	Old Quinn Mallory	Episode: "Roads Taken" (S. 4: Ep. 21).
