= Fanfare for Oscar =

1998 musical fanfare by Jerry Goldsmith

Instrumental by Jerry Goldsmith
- Written: 1998
- Recorded: January 30, 1998
- Studio: Todd-AO
- Length: 0:45
- Composer: Jerry Goldsmith

"Fanfare for Oscar" is a musical fanfare created by award-winning film composer Jerry Goldsmith in 1998. It is used by the Academy of Motion Picture Arts and Sciences as theme music for the academy's official events and presentations like the Academy Awards.

== History ==
In early 1998, film composer Jerry Goldsmith was approached by the Academy of Motion Picture Arts and Sciences to create a new fanfare theme for the academy's events and presentations, namely the annual Academy Awards ceremony. Goldsmith, who had also composed themes and fanfares for studios and production companies like Universal Pictures, Universal Television, Paramount, and Carolco, agreed to the assignment.

The composition, titled "Fanfare for Oscar," was first recorded on January 30, 1998, by an 83-piece orchestra at the Todd-AO studio in Hollywood, California. Goldsmith also composed and recorded several shorter renditions of the fanfare for use during the Oscar telecast.

"Fanfare for Oscar" was first used during the 1998 Oscar season, which included the nominee announcement on February 10 and the live telecast for the 70th Academy Awards, which was held on March 23 at the Shrine Auditorium. The fanfare has been used during every Academy Awards telecast since then.
