= Veronica Brebner =

American make-up artist

- Other name: Veronica McAleer
- Occupation: Make-up artist

Veronica McAleer, also known as Veronica Brebner, is a British make-up artist. She was nominated for two Academy Awards in the category Best Makeup and Hairstyling for the films Mrs Brown and Shakespeare in Love.

== Selected filmography ==
- Mrs Brown (1997; co-nominated with Lisa Westcott and Beverley Binda)
- Shakespeare in Love (1998; co-nominated with Lisa Westcott)
