= Hilary Henkin =

American screenwriter and producer

- Born: November 19, 1952 (age 73); New Orleans, Louisiana, United States
- Occupations: Screenwriter, film producer
- Years active: 1980–present

Hilary Henkin (born November 19, 1952) is an American screenwriter and producer, nominated for both a Golden Globe Award and an Academy Award for her work on the screenplay of Wag the Dog in 1997.

== Biography ==
Henkin was born in New Orleans, Louisiana, and raised in Memphis, Tennessee, and New York City. She attended the University of Lausanne in Switzerland.

Given the close relationship between Barry Levinson and David Mamet, who had been hired to rewrite Henkin's screenplay for Wag the Dog after Levinson became attached as director, New Line Cinema originally asked that Mamet be given sole screenplay credit; but the Writers Guild of America intervened on Henkin's behalf to ensure that Henkin received first-position shared screenplay credit as the original screenwriter and creator of its structure, which she loosely adapted from Larry Beinhart's novel American Hero, as well as much of the story and dialogue.

Other produced screenplays include V for Vendetta (2006), Romeo Is Bleeding (1993), Road House (1989), Fatal Beauty (1987), Flowers in the Attic (1987), Blue Heaven (1985), Prisoners (1982), and Headin' for Broadway (1980).

Henkin was also one of the producers of Romeo is Bleeding.
