= Beverley Binda =

British make-up artist

- Occupation: Make-up artist

Beverley Binda is a British make-up artist. She was nominated for an Academy Award in the category Best Makeup and Hairstyling for the film Mrs Brown.

== Selected filmography ==
- Mrs Brown (1997; co-nominated with Lisa Westcott and Veronica Brebner)
