= Mrs Brown =

1997 film by John Madden

- Australian theatrical release poster
- Directed by: John Madden
- Written by: Jeremy Brock
- Produced by: Sarah Curtis
- Starring: Judi Dench; Billy Connolly; Antony Sher; Geoffrey Palmer; Richard Pasco; David Westhead
- Cinematography: Richard Greatrex
- Edited by: Robin Sales
- Music by: Stephen Warbeck
- Production companies: BBC Films; Ecosse Films
- Distributed by: Miramax International (through Buena Vista International)
- Release dates: 18 July 1997 (US); 5 September 1997 (UK)
- Running time: 103 minutes
- Country: United Kingdom
- Language: English
- Box office: $13.2 million (US/UK)

Mrs Brown (also released in cinemas as Her Majesty, Mrs Brown) is a 1997 British historical drama film directed by John Madden from a screenplay by Jeremy Brock. It stars Judi Dench, Billy Connolly, Geoffrey Palmer, Antony Sher, and Gerard Butler in his film debut. The story concerns a recently widowed Queen Victoria and her relationship with a Scottish servant, John Brown, a trusted servant of her deceased husband, and the subsequent uproar it provoked. Brown had served Victoria's Prince Consort, Prince Albert; Victoria's Household thought Brown might help the Queen who had remained in mourning since the Prince Consort's death in 1861.

The film was produced by the BBC and Ecosse Films with the intention of being shown on BBC One and on WGBH's Masterpiece Theatre. However, it was acquired by Miramax and released to unexpected success, going on to earn more than $13.2 million worldwide.

The film was screened in the Un Certain Regard section at the 1997 Cannes Film Festival and released in the United Kingdom on 5 September 1997. Judi Dench won the Golden Globe Award for Best Actress in a Motion Picture – Drama and the BAFTA Award for Best Actress in a Leading Role; additionally, she was nominated for many other awards for her performance, including the Academy Award for Best Actress.

== Plot ==
In 1863, hoping to subtly coax Queen Victoria toward resuming public life after two years of seclusion, Scottish servant John Brown is summoned to court. The plan succeeds a little too well for the liking of Victoria's Chief Secretary Sir Henry Ponsonby and The Prince of Wales as well as other members of the Royal Family; the public, press and politicians soon come to resent Brown's perceived influence over Victoria. Brown takes considerable liberties with court protocol, especially by addressing Her Majesty as "woman". He also quickly takes control over the Queen's daily activities, further aggravating the tensions between himself and the Royal Family and servants.

The moniker "Mrs Brown", used both at the time and in the film, implied an improper and perhaps sexual relationship. The film does not directly address the contemporary suspicions that Victoria and Brown had had a sexual relationship and perhaps had even secretly married, though cartoons from the satirical magazine Punch are shown as being passed around in Parliament (one cartoon is revealed to the camera, showing an empty throne, with the sceptre lying unhanded across it).

As a result of Victoria's seclusion, especially at Balmoral Castle in Scotland (something initially encouraged by Brown), her popularity begins failing and republican sentiment begins growing. Prime Minister Benjamin Disraeli's hold over the House of Commons weakens and there is a fear of rising anti-monarchical sentiment in the country. He convinces Brown to use his influence with Victoria to persuade her to return to the performance of her public duties, especially the speech from the throne at the opening of Parliament.

Brown is reluctant to do so, rightly fearing that Victoria will take this as a personal betrayal. When he urges her to return to London and fulfil her public duties, an argument ensues. Feeling betrayed by Brown, Victoria becomes visibly agitated. When Brown once again refers to her as "woman", she sharply rebukes him. Leaving the room, she turns to Ponsonby and her physician, Dr. Jenner, requesting that they serve her needs, visibly demoting Brown's contact and influence. Their relationship was never to be the same again. Victoria's eventual acquiescence and her decision to return to public life leads to a revitalization of her popularity and a resurgence in public support of the monarchy.

Brown continues to serve Victoria until his death in 1883. In his final years, his duties become reduced to head of security. The palace staff has become weary of Brown's dogmatic ways and they mock and rebuke his security efforts as paranoid delusions. Finally, during a public event, a gun-wielding assassin appears out of the crowd leaping toward the Royal Family. An ever-vigilant Brown successfully thwarts the assassination attempt. At dinner the next evening the Prince of Wales retells the story, bragging to their dinner companions that he had been the one to warn Brown of the assassin. Seeing through her son's bragging, Victoria announces instead that a special medal for bravery, the "Devoted Service Medal", will be minted and awarded to Brown.

Years later, Brown becomes gravely ill with pneumonia after running through the woods late at night chasing a possible intruder. Hearing of his illness, Victoria visits his room and is shaken to see her old friend so ill. She confesses that she has not been as good a friend as she might have been in recent years, and the pneumonia proves fatal for Brown. During his years of service, Brown had kept a diary and upon his passing, Ponsonby and Jenner discuss its contents stating that it must never be seen by anyone.

The film's closing notes state: "John Brown's diary was never found." Jenner also reveals that the Prince of Wales hurled the Queen's favourite bust of Brown over the palace wall, referencing the film's opening sequence.

== Cast ==
- Judi Dench as Queen Victoria
- Billy Connolly as John Brown
- Geoffrey Palmer as Henry Ponsonby
- Antony Sher as Prime Minister Benjamin Disraeli
- Gerard Butler as Archie Brown
- David Westhead as Bertie, Prince of Wales
- Richard Pasco as Dr. Jenner
- Bridget McConnell as Lady Ely
- Georgie Glen as Lady Churchill
- Catherine O'Donnell as Lady in waiting

== Reception ==
=== Box office ===
The film opened 18 July 1997 on 6 screens (including 3 in Los Angeles and 2 in New York) and grossed $76,268 for the weekend. It went on to gross $9.2 million in the United States and Canada. In the UK, the film opened 5 September 1997 on 149 screens and grossed a disappointing £228,469, however, it improved and went on to gross £2,542,212 ($4 million).

=== Critical response ===
In a contemporary review Roger Ebert said, "It is not about sexual love, or even romantic love, really, but about that kind of love based on challenge and fascination." He called Judi Dench "wonderful"; Connolly "has the reserve and self-confidence that most stand-up comics lack almost by definition".

On review aggregator website Rotten Tomatoes the film has an approval rating of 92% based on 50 reviews, with an average rating of 7.3/10. The site's critical consensus reads, "Thanks to some top notch acting, the chemistry between its stars, and a witty, thoughtful script, Mrs. Brown delivers a nuanced and entertaining, if not entirely factual, account of a seldom explored historical relationship." Metacritic, another review aggregator, assigned the film a weighted average score of 71 out of 100, based on 22 critics, indicating "generally favorable reviews".

=== Awards and nominations ===
| Award | Category | Nominee(s) | Result | Ref. |
|---|---|---|---|---|
| Academy Awards | Best Actress | Judi Dench | Nominated | |
| Academy Awards | Best Makeup | Lisa Westcott, Veronica Brebner, and Beverley Binda | Nominated | |
| British Academy Film Awards | Best Film | Sarah Curtis | Nominated | |
| British Academy Film Awards | Best British Film | Sarah Curtis | Nominated | |
| British Academy Film Awards | Best Actor in a Leading Role | Billy Connolly | Nominated | |
| British Academy Film Awards | Best Actress in a Leading Role | Judi Dench | Won | |
| British Academy Film Awards | Best Screenplay – Original | Jeremy Brock | Nominated | |
| British Academy Film Awards | Best Costume Design | Deirdre Clancy | Won | |
| British Academy Film Awards | Best Make Up/Hair | Lisa Westcott | Nominated | |
| British Academy Film Awards | Best Production Design | Martin Childs | Nominated | |
| British Academy Scotland Awards | Best Feature Film | Sarah Curtis, John Madden, and Jeremy Brock | Nominated | |
| British Academy Scotland Awards | Best Actor in a Film | Billy Connolly | Nominated | |
| British Academy Scotland Awards | Best Actress in a Film | Judi Dench | Won | |
| Chicago Film Critics Association Awards | Best Actress | Judi Dench | Won | |
| Chlotrudis Awards | Best Supporting Actor | Antony Sher | Nominated | |
| Evening Standard British Film Awards | Best Screenplay | Jeremy Brock | Won | |
| Evening Standard British Film Awards | Peter Sellers Award for Comedy | Antony Sher | Won | |
| Golden Globe Awards | Best Actress in a Motion Picture – Drama | Judi Dench | Won | |
| Golden Reel Awards | Best Sound Editing – Foreign Feature | | Nominated | |
| London Film Critics Circle Awards | British Actress of the Year | Judi Dench | Won | |
| Mar del Plata International Film Festival | Best Film (International Competition) | John Madden | Nominated | |
| Mar del Plata International Film Festival | Special Jury Award | John Madden | Won | |
| National Society of Film Critics Awards | Best Actress | Judi Dench | 3rd Place | |
| New York Film Critics Circle Awards | Best Actress | Judi Dench | Runner-up | |
| Online Film & Television Association Awards | Best Actress | Judi Dench | Nominated | |
| Online Film & Television Association Awards | Best Drama Actress | Judi Dench | Nominated | |
| Online Film Critics Society Awards | Best Actress | Judi Dench | Won | |
| Satellite Awards | Best Actress in a Motion Picture – Drama | Judi Dench | Won | |
| Satellite Awards | Best Supporting Actor in a Motion Picture – Drama | Billy Connolly | Nominated | |
| Satellite Awards | Best Screenplay – Original | Jeremy Brock | Nominated | |
| Satellite Awards | Best Costume Design | Deirdre Clancy | Nominated | |
| Screen Actors Guild Awards | Outstanding Performance by a Female Actor in a Leading Role | Judi Dench | Nominated | |
| Screen Actors Guild Awards | Outstanding Performance by a Male Actor in a Supporting Role | Billy Connolly | Nominated | |
| SESC Film Festival | Best Foreign Actress | Judi Dench | Won (Note: Tied with Robin Wright for She's So Lovely.) | |
| Society of Texas Film Critics Awards | Best Actress | Judi Dench | Nominated | |
| Southeastern Film Critics Association Awards | Best Actress | Judi Dench | Runner-up | |

== Soundtrack ==
Mrs Brown

Soundtrack album by Stephen Warbeck
- Released: 1997
- Genre: Soundtrack
- Label: Milan

Stephen Warbeck soundtrack chronology
| Different for Girls (1996) | Mrs Brown (1997) | Shakespeare in Love (1998) |

All tracks composed by Stephen Warbeck.

| No. | Title | Length |
|---|---|---|
| 1. | "The Walk on the Moors" |
| 2. | "The Swim" |
| 3. | "Queen Victoria And John Brown" |
| 4. | "The Loch" |
| 5. | "The Fight" |
| 6. | "The First Ride" |
| 7. | "The Assassination Attempt" |
| 8. | "Typhoid Fever" |
| 9. | "The End of the Loch" |
| 10. | "Brown and the Pony" |
| 11. | "The Pipes: All The Blue Bombersare O'er The Border" |
| 12. | "Loch Nagar" |
| 13. | "After The Dance" |
| 14. | "Political Intrigue" |
| 15. | "The Promise" |
| 16. | "No Toast For Brown" |
| 17. | "The Closing" |

== See also ==
- Victoria & Abdul, a later film in which Dench also plays Queen Victoria, sometimes described as an unofficial sequel.

Films about Queen Victoria

- The Young Victoria
- Victoria & Albert (TV serial)
- Victoria the Great
- Victoria (TV serial)
