= Eugene L. Eubank =

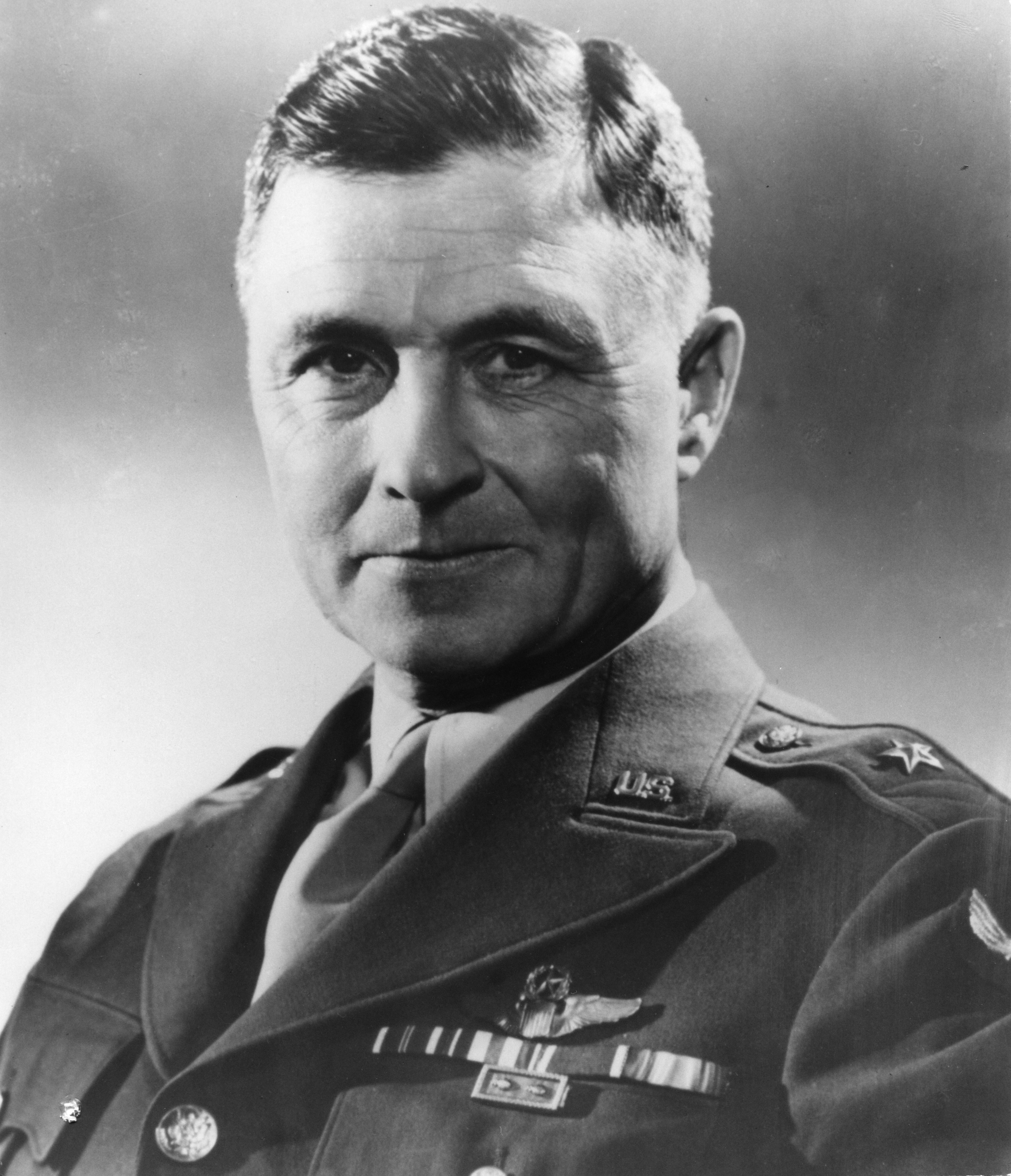

Eugene Lowry Eubank (2 December 1892 – 9 April 1997) was a United States Air Force major general whose career began in the Signal Corps during World War I and ended with his retirement in 1954. He commanded the 19th Bombardment Group when it was sent to the Philippines in 1941 and was in command of its B-17 force when the Japanese attacked Clark Field in of that year. He later led the Second Bomber Command and the Third Division of the Eighth Air Force, and finished his career as commander of Technical Training Air Force. At retirement he was the oldest pilot on active duty in the air force. He died at the age of 104.

== Early life and WW I ==
Eubank was born in Mangum, Oklahoma. his father worked in Real estate in Port Arthur, Texas, and Eubank was a member of the family firm when the United States entered WW I. In 1917 he entered flight training as an aviation cadet, attending ground school at the University of Texas before moving to Kelly Field near San Antonio. One of his classmates was Sidney J. Brooks Jr., who fired a volley at his funeral. Eugene was commissioned a second lieutenant in the Signal Reverse on 13 February 1918, and served as a flying instructor at Kelly Field.

== Interwar career ==
In 1919-2020 Eugene flew border patrol missions between Brownsville, Texas to San Diego, California. He received a commission Regular Army's Air Service on 1 July 1920, and after completing the Air Service Mechanical School that December was posted to Chanute Field, Illinois, where he commanded a detachment and then served as adjutant. He was stationed at Schofield Barracks, Hawaii in 1922. there he met Helen the daughter of Colonel William Kelly Jr.; they married in 1924. While in Hawaii he served as aide to Billy Mitchell, and was later called as witness at Mitchell's 1925 court-martial. From 1927 to 1929 he was a test pilot at Wright Field, Ohio. From July to December 1933 Eubank served with the Civilian Conservation Corps at West Point, Virginia, then returned to Langley Field as commanding officer of the 2nd bombardment Group.

He attended the Command and General Staff School at Fort Leavenworth from August 1937 to June 1938, the took command of the 32nd bombardment squadron at March Field, California. After a naval operation course at Maxwell Field, he returned March Field and in October 1938 took command of the 34th bombardment squadron, part of the 19th bombardment group.

=== 19th Bombardment Group ===
Eugene became commander of the 19th bombardment group in April 1940 and moved it to Albuquerque Army Air Base, New Mexico, in 1941. For planning and leading a night flight of 21 aircraft from Hamilton Field, California, to Hickam Field, Hawaii, on 13-14 May 1941, he received a commendation from the Secretary of War. The group was sent to the Philippines in October 1941 and by 1 December had all of its squadrons at Clark Field. In the week before the war, as reports of Japanese aircraft over the island increased, Eubank sent two squadrons, the 14th and 93rd, with 16 B-17s, south to Del Monte Field, Mindanao. The 28th and 30th remained at Clark. Lewis H. Brereton, commander of the Far East Air Force, notified Eugene of the attack on Pearl Harbor early on 8 December. Japanese aircraft struck Clark Field around midday, destroying twelve out of the nineteen B-17s there. A group of B-17s from the 19th later attacked the Japanese invasion convoys approaching Luzon on 10 December.

== World War II service ==
Eubank was temporary promoted to Brigadier General in 1942. From September 1942 to April 1943 he was director of bombardment at air force headquarters and in April 1943 became commanding general of the Second Bomb Command at Fort George Wright, Washington. In February 1945 he went to the European theater as deputy commander for operations of the Eight Air Force and four months later took command of its Third Division.

== Postwar career and retirement ==
Eubank was temporary promoted to major general on 4 July 1946. In November 1948 he became chief of the Air Force Manpower Group at Air Force headquarters. In March 1950 he moved to the inspector general's field office at Kelly Field, Texas, as deputy inspector general and in November 1951 he took command of the Technical Training Air Force at Gulfport, Mississippi. He retired in December 1954 at the age of 62 with over 14,000 flying hours and was then the oldest active pilot on duty. After retiring Eubank served as chairman of the board of a bank in Gulfport. In 1982 he and his wife moved to an Air Force Village in San Antonio, were he was interviewed in 1993 at the age of 100. He died on 9 April 1997.

== Awards and legacy ==
Eubank's decorations include the Distinguished Service Medal, the Silver Star and the Distinguished Flying Cross with oak leaf cluster. The Major General Eubank L. Eubank Award, established by the Order of Daedalians in 1990, is given annually to the small Force support squadron in the Air Force.
