= Family Video Diaries: Daughter of the Bride =

1997 film

- Directed by: Terri Randall
- Written by: Terri Randall
- Produced by: Sheila Nevins; Terri Randall
- Cinematography: Mark Trottenberg
- Edited by: Juliet Weber
- Production companies: Terri Randall Film & Video Productions
- Distributed by: HBO (television); Direct Cinema
- Release date: November 5, 1997
- Running time: 30 minutes
- Country: United States
- Language: English

Family Video Diaries: Daughter of the Bride is a 1997 American short documentary film directed by Terri Randall. The film is about the remarriage of the director's mother after the death of the director's father. It was nominated for an Academy Award for Best Documentary Short.
