= Wag the Dog =

1997 film by Barry Levinson

- Theatrical release poster
- Directed by: Barry Levinson
- Screenplay by: Hilary Henkin; David Mamet
- Based on: American Hero by Larry Beinhart
- Produced by: Barry Levinson; Robert De Niro; Jane Rosenthal
- Starring: Dustin Hoffman; Robert De Niro; Anne Heche; Denis Leary; Willie Nelson; Andrea Martin; Kirsten Dunst; William H. Macy
- Cinematography: Robert Richardson
- Edited by: Stu Linder
- Music by: Mark Knopfler
- Production companies: Baltimore Pictures; TriBeCa Productions
- Distributed by: New Line Cinema
- Release dates: December 17, 1997 (Century City); December 25, 1997 (United States)
- Running time: 97 minutes
- Country: United States
- Language: English
- Budget: $15 million
- Box office: $64.3 million

Wag the Dog is a 1997 American political satire black comedy film starring Dustin Hoffman and Robert De Niro. Produced and directed by Barry Levinson, the film centers on spin doctor Conrad Brean and Hollywood producer Stanley Motss who fabricate a war in Albania to distract voters from a presidential sex scandal. The screenplay by Hilary Henkin and David Mamet is loosely adapted from Larry Beinhart's 1993 novel American Hero.

Wag the Dog was released one month before the news broke of the Clinton–Lewinsky scandal and eight months before the bombing of the Al-Shifa pharmaceutical factory in Sudan by the Clinton administration in August 1998, which prompted the media to draw comparisons between the film and these events. Comparison was also made in December 1998, when the administration initiated a bombing campaign of Iraq during Bill Clinton's impeachment trial for the Clinton–Lewinsky scandal, and again in spring 1999, when the administration intervened in the Kosovo War by initiating a bombing campaign against Yugoslavia, which, coincidentally, borders Albania.

Wag the Dog premiered at Century City on December 17, 1997 before being released by New Line Cinema on December 25, 1997. The film grossed $64.3 million on a $15 million budget, and was well received by critics, who praised the direction, performances, themes and humor. Hoffman received a nomination for the Academy Award for Best Actor for his performance and screenwriters David Mamet and Hilary Henkin were both nominated for Best Adapted Screenplay.

== Plot ==
The president of the United States is caught making advances on an underage girl inside the Oval Office less than two weeks before the election. Conrad Brean, a top spin doctor, is brought in by presidential aide Winifred Ames to take the public's attention away from the scandal. He decides to construct a fictional war in Albania, hoping that the media will concentrate on this instead. Brean contacts Hollywood producer Stanley Motss to create the war, complete with a theme song and fake film footage of a fleeing orphan to arouse sympathy. The hoax is initially successful, with the president quickly gaining ground in the polls.

When the CIA learns of the plot, it sends Agent Charles Young to confront Brean about the hoax. Brean convinces Young that revealing the deception is against his and the CIA's best interests. But when the CIA, in collusion with the president's rival candidate Senator John Neal, reports that the war has ended, the media begins to revert its focus to the president's sexual misconduct scandal. To counter this, Motss invents a hero who was left behind enemy lines in Albania.

Inspired by the idea that he was "discarded like an old shoe", Brean and Motss ask the Pentagon to provide a special forces soldier with a matching name (a sergeant named William Schumann is identified), around whom a POW narrative can be shoehorned. As part of the hoax, folk singer Johnny Dean records a song called "Old Shoe", which is pressed onto a 78-rpm record, prematurely aged so that listeners will think that it was recorded years earlier and sent to the Library of Congress to be "found". Bream and Motss fling pairs of old shoes into a tree outside of the White House grounds. Soon, large numbers of shoes begin appearing on phone and power lines and a grassroots movement to bring home Schumann takes hold, completing a successful astroturfing.

When the team goes to retrieve Schumann, they discover that he is actually a criminally insane Army convict. On the return to Andrews Air Force Base, their plane crashes. The team survives and is rescued by a farmer, an illegal migrant. However, Schumann is killed when he attempts to rape a gas station owner's daughter. Seizing the opportunity, Motss stages an elaborate military funeral for Schumann, claiming that he died from wounds sustained during his rescue and the farmer receives expedited citizenship to enhance the story.

As the president rallies toward re-election, Motss becomes frustrated that the media are crediting his upsurge in the polls to the bland campaign slogan, "Don't change horses in mid-stream", rather than to Motss's hard work. Despite Brean's offer of an ambassadorship and the dire warning that he is "playing with his life", Motss demands that he receive credit for his production and he threatens to reveal his involvement if he doesn't. Realizing that he has no choice, Brean orders his security staff to kill him. A newscast reports that Motss has died of a heart attack at home, the president has been successfully re-elected and an Albanian terrorist organization has claimed responsibility for a recent bombing, suggesting that the fake war is becoming real.

== Cast ==
- Dustin Hoffman as Stanley Motss
- Robert De Niro as Conrad Brean
- Anne Heche as Winifred Ames
- Denis Leary as Fad King
- Willie Nelson as Johnny Dean
- Andrea Martin as Liz Butsky
- Kirsten Dunst as Tracy Lime
- William H. Macy as CIA Agent Charles Young
- John Michael Higgins as John Levy
- Suzie Plakson as Grace
- Craig T. Nelson as Senator Neal
- George Gaynes as Senator Cole
- Sean Masterson as Bob Richardson
- Woody Harrelson as Sergeant William Schumann
- Suzanne Cryer as Amy Cain
- James Belushi as Himself
- Shirley Prestia as Herself
- Roebuck "Pops" Staples as Himself
- Merle Haggard as Himself

== Production ==
The title of the film comes from the English-language idiom "the tail wagging the dog" which is referenced at the beginning of the film by a caption that reads:

Why does the dog wag its tail?
Because a dog is smarter than its tail.
If the tail were smarter, it would wag the dog.

Dustin Hoffman's character Stanley Motss is said to have been directly based on famed producer Robert Evans. Similarities have been noted between the character and Evans's work habits, mannerisms, quirks, clothing style, hairstyle and large, square-framed eyeglasses. In fact, the real Evans is said to have joked, "I'm magnificent in this film". While Hoffman has never discussed deriving his portrayal from Evans, the commentary track for the film's DVD release makes the claim. Hoffman had originally planned to portray a similar character in the 1984 film The Muppets Take Manhattan but pulled out of that film fearing that Evans would have been offended by the portrayal.

Writing credits for the film became controversial due to objections by Barry Levinson. After Levinson became attached as director, David Mamet was hired to rewrite Hilary Henkin's screenplay, which was loosely adapted from Larry Beinhart's novel American Hero. Given the close relationship between Levinson and Mamet, New Line Cinema asked that Mamet be given sole credit for the screenplay. However, the Writers Guild of America intervened on Henkin's behalf to ensure that Henkin received first-position shared screenplay credit, finding that, as the original screenwriter, Henkin had created the screenplay's structure, as well as much of the screen story and dialogue.

Levinson threatened to quit the Guild (though he did not), claiming that Mamet had written all of the dialogue, as well as creating the characters of Motss and William Schumann (Woody Harrelson), and had originated most of the scenes set in Hollywood and all of the scenes set in Nashville. Levinson attributed the numerous similarities between Henkin's original version and the eventual shooting script to Henkin and Mamet working from the same novel but the Writers Guild of America disagreed in its credit arbitration ruling.

== Music ==
The film features many songs created for the fictitious campaign waged to deflect the president (Michael Belson)'s sex scandal. These include "Good Old Shoe", "The American Dream" and "The Men of the 303". However, the film’s soundtrack CD features only the title track (by British guitarist and vocalist Mark Knopfler) and seven of Knopfler's instrumentals.

=== Songs as listed in the film's credits ===
- "Thank Heaven for Little Girls": written by Lerner and Lowe, performed by Maurice Chevalier
- "I Guard the Canadian Border": written by Tom Bähler and Willie Nelson, performed by Willie Nelson
- "The American Dream": written by Bähler, performed by Bähler
- "Good Old Shoe": written by Edgar Winter, performed by Nelson and Pops Staples
- "Classical Allegro": written by Marc Ferrari and Nancy Hieronymous
- "Courage Mom": written by Merle Haggard and performed by Merle Haggard and the Strangers
- "Barracuda": written by Heart, referenced by Woody Harrelson in character
- "I Love the Nightlife": written by Alicia Bridges and Susan Hutcheson
- "God Bless the Men of the 303": written by Huey Lewis, performed by Lewis, Scott Mathews and Johnny Colla
- "Wag the Dog": written and performed by Mark Knopfler

== Home media ==
Wag the Dog was released on VHS, DVD and LaserDisc in 1998. It was released on Blu-ray on August 18, 2026, by the Warner Archive Collection.

== Reception ==
In a contemporary review, Roger Ebert of the Chicago Sun-Times awarded the film four stars out of four, and wrote in his review, "The movie is a satire that contains just enough realistic ballast to be teasingly plausible; like Dr. Strangelove, it makes you laugh, and then it makes you wonder." He ranked it as his tenth favorite film of 1997. In 2020, Ann Hornaday of The Washington Post rated it at number 12 on her list of the best political movies ever made.

Wag the Dog has an approval rating of 86% on Rotten Tomatoes, based on 78 reviews, with an average rating of 7.5/10. The site's critical consensus reads: "Smart, well-acted, and uncomfortably prescient political satire from director Barry Levinson and an all-star cast." On Metacritic, which assigns a weighted average rating, the film holds a score of 74 out of 100, based on 22 critics, indicating "generally favorable" reviews. Audiences polled by CinemaScore gave the film an average grade of "B–" on a scale of A+ to F.

=== Accolades ===
Award	Category	Nominee(s)	Result	Ref.
Academy Awards	Best Actor	Dustin Hoffman	Nominated	
Academy Awards	Best Screenplay – Based on Material Previously Produced or Published	Hilary Henkin and David Mamet	Nominated	
Artios Awards	Best Casting for Feature Film – Comedy	Ellen Chenoweth and Debra Zane	Nominated	
Berlin International Film Festival	Golden Bear	Barry Levinson	Nominated	
Berlin International Film Festival	Special Jury Prize	Barry Levinson	Won	
British Academy Film Awards	Best Adapted Screenplay	Hilary Henkin and David Mamet	Nominated	
Critics' Choice Awards	Best Picture		Nominated	
Golden Globe Awards	Best Motion Picture – Musical or Comedy		Nominated	
Golden Globe Awards	Best Actor in a Motion Picture – Musical or Comedy	Dustin Hoffman	Nominated	
Golden Globe Awards	Best Screenplay – Motion Picture	Hilary Henkin and David Mamet	Nominated	
National Board of Review Awards	Best Supporting Actress	Anne Heche (also for Donnie Brasco)	Won	
National Society of Film Critics Awards	Best Actor	Dustin Hoffman	3rd Place	
Online Film & Television Association Awards	Best Comedy/Musical Picture	Danny DeVito, Barry Levinson and Jane Rosenthal	Nominated	
Online Film & Television Association Awards	Best Comedy/Musical Actor	Dustin Hoffman	Nominated	
Online Film & Television Association Awards	Best Screenplay – Based on Material from Another Medium	Hilary Henkin and David Mamet	Nominated	
Political Film Society Awards	Democracy		Nominated	
Russian Guild of Film Critics Awards	Best Foreign Actor	Robert De Niro	Nominated	
Satellite Awards	Best Actor in a Motion Picture – Musical or Comedy	Dustin Hoffman	Nominated	
Satellite Awards	Best Supporting Actress in a Motion Picture – Musical or Comedy	Anne Heche	Nominated	
Screen Actors Guild Awards	Outstanding Performance by a Male Actor in a Leading Role	Dustin Hoffman	Nominated	
Turkish Film Critics Association Awards	Best Foreign Film		7th Place	
Writers Guild of America Awards	Best Screenplay – Based on Material Previously Produced or Published	Hilary Henkin and David Mamet	Nominated	

== Television adaptation ==
On April 27, 2017, Deadline reported that Barry Levinson, Robert De Niro and Tom Fontana were developing a television series based on the film for HBO. De Niro's TriBeCa Productions was to co-produce, along with Levinson's and Fontana's companies.

== See also ==
- Astroturfing, a controversial public relations practice depicted in the film
- Canadian Bacon and Wrong Is Right, films about an American war started for similar reasons
