= Lisa Westcott =

British make-up artist (1948–2024)

- Born: 11 March 1948
- Died: 30 July 2024 (aged 76); Oxford, England
- Occupation: Make-up artist
- Years active: 1975–2024
- Spouse: Jeremy Ancock
- Children: 2

Lisa Westcott (11 March 1948 – 30 July 2024) was a British make-up artist. During her career she won an Academy Award, five BAFTA Awards, and was nominated for a Primetime Emmy Award.

== Accolades ==
Award	Year	Category	Work	Result
Academy Awards	1998	Best Makeup	Mrs Brown	Nominated
Academy Awards	1999	Best Makeup	Shakespeare in Love	Nominated
Academy Awards	2013	Best Makeup and Hairstyling	Les Misérables	Won
British Academy Film Awards	1996	Best Makeup and Hair	The Madness of King George	Won
British Academy Film Awards	1998	Best Makeup and Hair	Mrs Brown	Nominated
British Academy Film Awards	1999	Best Makeup and Hair	Shakespeare in Love	Nominated
British Academy Film Awards	2013	Best Makeup and Hair	Les Misérables	Won
British Academy Television Awards	1986	Best Make Up	Bleak House	Won
British Academy Television Awards	1991	Best Make Up	Portrait of a Marriage	Nominated
British Academy Television Awards	1999	Best Make Up	Our Mutual Friend	Won
British Academy Television Awards	2000	Make-Up and Hair Design	Wives and Daughters	Won
Primetime Emmy Awards	2001	Outstanding Hairstyling for a Miniseries, Movie or a Special	The Last of the Blonde Bombshells	Nominated

== Selected filmography ==
- Les Misérables (2012)
- Captain America: The First Avenger (2011)
- The Wolfman (2010)
- Miss Potter (2006)
- From Hell (2001)
- Shakespeare in Love (1998)
- Mrs Brown (1997)
