= Larry Beinhart =

American author (born 1947)

- Born: June 8, 1947 (age 79); Woodstock, New York, U.S.
- Occupations: Novelist, columnist, blogger
- Notable work: American Hero

Larry Beinhart is an America novelist, columnist, and blogger. He is best known as the author of the political and detective novel American Hero, which was adapted into the political-parody film Wag the Dog.

== Biography ==
Beinhart was born in Woodstock, New York, on June 8, 1947. He has indicated that an early inspiration was the works of George Bernard Shaw, who besides his writing skills and wit, "created dramas out of ideas". By this dictum, Beinhart seeks to "create situations in which ideas - about God, why we go to war, who gets the money, how politics work, what the media actually does, about science and morality - are challenged by circumstances".

Beinhart spent two years at Wadham College in Oxford, England as the recipient of a Raymond Chandler Fulbright Fellowship in Detective and Crime Fiction Writing. His No One Rides for Free (1986) received a 1987 Edgar Award for Best First Novel.

Beinhart has been a columnist for Al Jazeera since October 2016, at Alternet 2005–2012, and had a blog at HuffPost in 2011. His principal concerns are the US economy and politics, taxes, and the rising inequalities moving into the age of Trump. Beinhart joined the Al Jazeera TV series Empire as a behind-the-scenes consultant for the 2013 episode "Empire of Secrets" about the clandestine world of government secrets.

== Film adaptions ==
Wag the Dog, the 1997 film version of the novel American Hero, was directed by Barry Levinson and starred Dustin Hoffman, Robert De Niro, Anne Heche, William H. Macy, Denis Leary, Kirsten Dunst, Woody Harrelson and Willie Nelson.

His novel Salvation Boulevard was adapted as a film and released in 2011. It features Pierce Brosnan, Greg Kinnear, Jennifer Connelly, Marisa Tomei, Isabelle Fuhrman, Ed Harris and Jim Gaffigan. The director is George Ratliff, the producers were Cathy Schulman and Celine Rattray.

== Personal life ==
Beinhart resides in Woodstock, New York, with his wife and two children. He is a keen skier and sometime instructor at Hunter Mountain in New York State.

== Selected works ==
=== Novels ===
- No One Rides For Free (1986)*
- You Get What You Pay For (1988)*
- Foreign Exchange (1992)*
- American Hero (1993) (reissued as Wag the Dog: A Novel)
- The Librarian (2004)
- Salvation Boulevard (2008)
- The Tony Cassella Mysteries (omnibus) (2013)*
- Zombie Pharm (2021)
- The Deal Goes Down (2022)

* Tony Cassella series

=== Non-fiction ===
- How to Write a Mystery (1996)
- Fog Facts: Searching for Truth in the Land of Spin (2005) PublicAffairs, ISBN 1-56858-716-3
