= Wag the Dog (novel) =

1993 satirical novel by Larry Beinhart

Wag the Dog: A Novel
- First edition
- Author: Larry Beinhart
- Original title: American Hero
- Cover artist: Maria Elias
- Language: English
- Genre: Satire, Conspiracy fiction
- Publisher: Nation Books
- Publication date: 1993, 2004
- Publication place: United States
- Media type: Print (paperback)
- Pages: 392
- ISBN: 1-56025-663-X
- LC Class: PS3552.E425 A8 1993

American Hero is a 1993 satirical conspiracy novel, reissued as Wag the Dog: A Novel in 2004, written by Larry Beinhart. It speculates that Operation Desert Storm had been scripted and choreographed as a ploy to get George H. W. Bush reelected to a second term (taking cues from Margaret Thatcher's similar war in the Falkland Islands), while at the same time analyzing exactly why that conflict had been so popular. The book formed the inspiration and basis for the 1997 film, Wag the Dog.

== Plot ==
On his death bed, Lee Atwater devises a plan to secure president George H. W. Bush's reelection by having a war professionally produced by Hollywood agent David Hartman.

The plan is set in motion after Atwater's death, and Hartman hires movie director John Lincoln Beagle to produce the fake war. Beagle cancels other film projects to be able to prioritize the production of the war, among them one with movie star Magdalena Lazlo, who hires private investigator Joe Broz to find out why her film was cancelled. Broz, who works for the Los Angeles branch of the large private security company Universal Security (U.Sec.), first moves in with Lazlo as her chauffeur/bodyguard to perform background investigation. When he discovers that Lazlo's house has been bugged by U.Sec., the two stage a simulated love affair to confuse their observers. As part of this cover story, Broz pretends to have taken over as Lazlo's agent, a social ascent that gives him better access to the people that might be behind what the two assume to be a conspiracy against Lazlo.

Meanwhile, Beagle has brainstormed possible war scenarios and has decided to produce a remake of World War II dubbed "WWII--the video." The situation escalates when an aide to Beagle, an aspiring script writer, contacts Broz with a script for Lazlo and when U.Sec., assuming that the aide wants to leak details about Beagle's secret project, steps in and kills the writer. Lazlo and Broz, together with the latter's ex-Marine friends finally begin to understand the background situation better and manage to steal a memo from Beagle outlining the project. In return, U.Sec. kidnaps Lazlo and trades her for the memo.

After a martial arts showdown, all parties agree to a truce, but at a film event in Mexico, U.Sec. decides to act unilaterally, killing Lazlo and a stranger they mistake for Broz. The detective, heartbroken, then turns to drinking and eventually knocks at a fictional author's door to tell his story.

== Editions ==
The story’s final plot element is present only in some editions of the novel, and is omitted from individual translations.

== Reception ==
=== Reviews ===
Reviews focused mostly on the plot and were mixed. In The New York Times, Caryn James called the book "surprisingly flat", whereas Richard Eder in the Los Angeles Times praised it as a "funny, ingenious and outrageous political thriller".

=== Critique ===
The novel has received only limited critical attention. It is featured in depth in a chapter in Stacy Olster's The Trash Phenomenon and in several academic publications by Sebastian M. Herrmann. Olster reads the novel in the context of postmodern cultural recycling and as commentary on a cultural shift away from text, stating, "For Beinhart, 'images have now replaced words as repositories of history' leading to a situation in which 'changes of history can be achieved by changes in imagery'." Herrmann lauds the novel's postmodern quality and its "diegetic and narrative games" and reads its central concern with the manipulation of political reality as indicative of an "epistemic panic" and, in consequence, as indicative of early forms of post-truth politics.

== See also ==
- The Gulf War Did Not Take Place
