= Fantasyland (disambiguation) =

Fantasyland is a "themed area" at Disney theme parks.

Fantasyland may also refer to:

- Fantasyland: How America Went Haywire, a 2017 book by Kurt Andersen
- Fantasyland (album), a 2024 album by Chen Zhiyi
- Fantasyland (West Edmonton Mall), now Galaxyland, an indoor amusement park in Edmonton, Alberta, Canada
- Fantasy Land (Mumbai), a former amusement park
- Fantasyland, or fantasy world, a fictional world
- Fantasyland, a bonus in open-face Chinese poker
- Fantasyland, a series of novels by Kristen Ashley
- Fantasyland, a former Christmas attraction in Halifax, Nova Scotia, Canada operated by Nova Scotia Light and Power

== See also ==
- Phantasialand
- The Tough Guide to Fantasyland
