= The Hungarian Pastry Shop =

Café and bakery in New York, United States

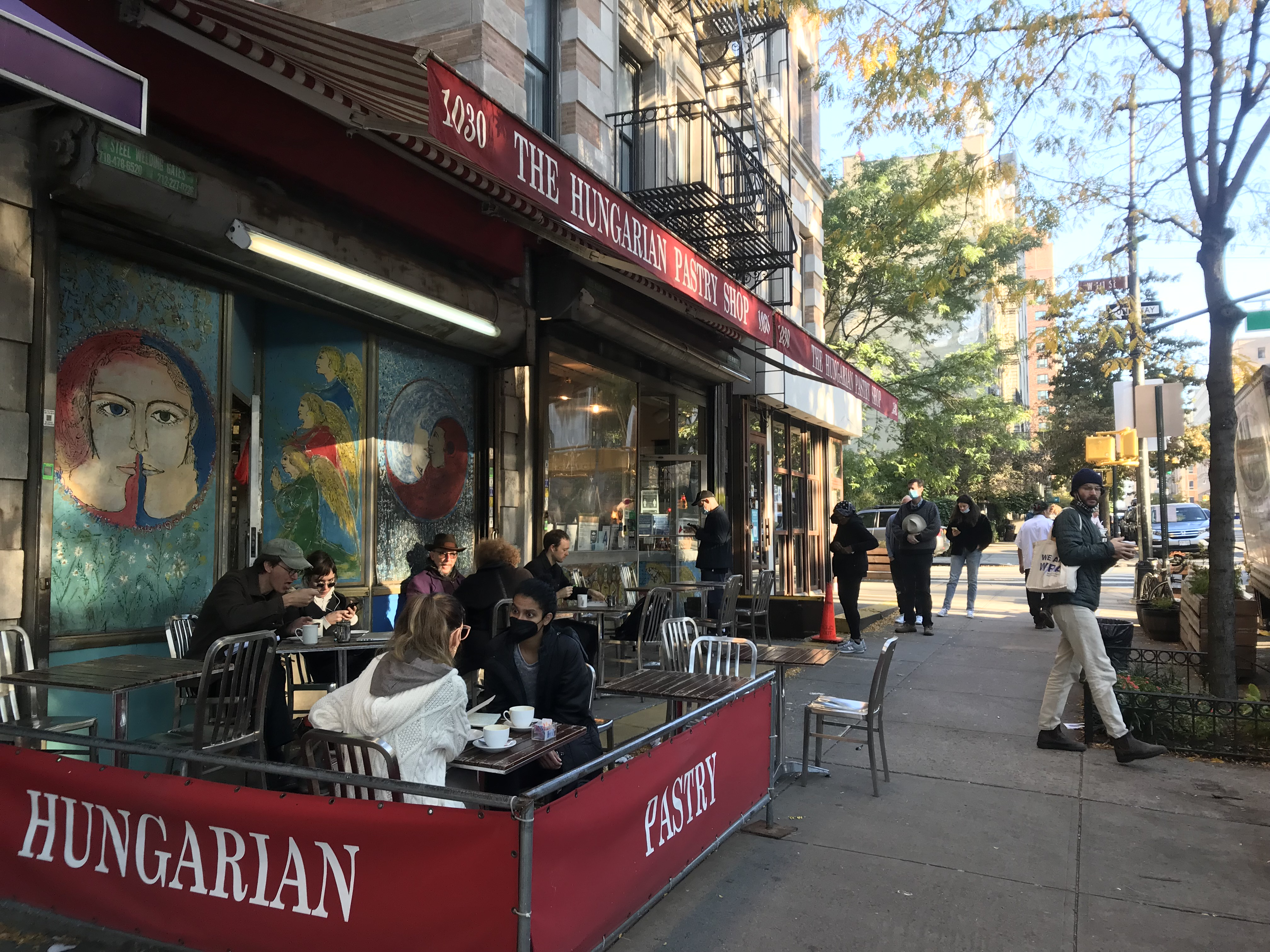
- View from sidewalk in 2021
- Interactive map of The Hungarian Pastry Shop

Restaurant information
- Established: 1961
- Location: 1030 Amsterdam Avenue, New York, New York, 10025, United States
- Coordinates: 40°48′12.9″N 73°57′49.3″W

The Hungarian Pastry Shop is a café and bakery in the Morningside Heights neighborhood of Manhattan in New York City. It is located at 1030 Amsterdam Avenue between West 110th Street (also known as Cathedral Parkway) and West 111th Street, across the street from the Cathedral of St. John the Divine.

== History ==
A Hungarian couple opened Hungarian Pastry Shop in 1961. Panagiotis ("Peter") and Wendy Binioris purchased the café from its original owners in 1976. Their son, Philip Binioris, has operated the venue since 2012. The café does not provide Wi-Fi access to its customers.

The shop has long served as a regular place of visitation for students and professors at Columbia University, writers, and other residents of Morningside Heights and the Upper West Side. A number of books have been written by authors while sitting in the café, including When the Emperor Was Divine and The Buddha in the Attic, both written by Julie Otsuka, The Perfect Storm by Sebastian Junger, What We Talk About When We Talk About Anne Frank by Nathan Englander, The Ruined House by Reuven Namdar, Between the World and Me by Ta-Nehisi Coates, and One of the Boys by Daniel Magariel.

In 2014, Fodor's named the Hungarian Pastry Shop one of New York City's ten most storied literary haunts.

The café has also made several appearances in pop culture, including the film Husbands and Wives and the TV show Gossip Girl.
