= Akilah Hughes =

American writer, comedian, YouTuber, podcaster, and actress

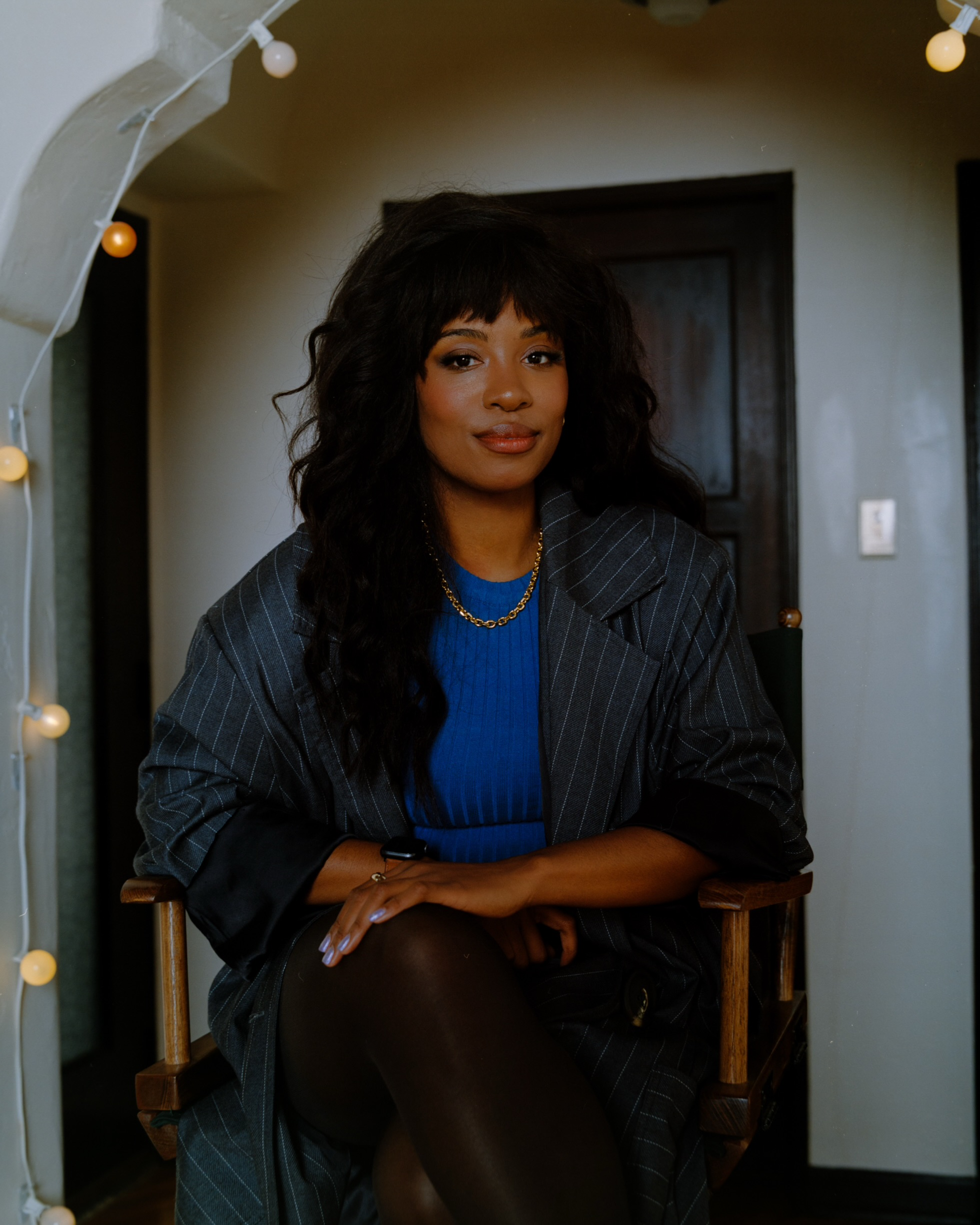
- Akilah Hughes in 2018
- Born: Akilah Saidah Kamaria Hughes; August 31, 1989 (age 37); Florence, Kentucky, U.S.
- Education: Berea College
- Occupations: Comedian; Author; YouTuber; podcast host
- Years active: 2006–present

YouTube information
- Channel: Akilah Obviously
- Subscribers: 145 thousand
- Views: 11.6 million
- Last updated: July 24, 2022
- Website: itsakilahobviously.com

Akilah Saidah Kamaria Hughes (born August 31, 1989) is an American writer, comedian, YouTuber, podcaster, and actress. She has been a digital correspondent for MTV, HBO, Fusion TV, and Comedy Central. She began her career on a YouTube channel, "It's Akilah, Obviously!", which has gained more than 150,000 subscribers. From October 2019 to July 2021, she co-hosted the Crooked Media podcast What a Day, alongside journalist Gideon Resnick.

== Early life and education ==
Akilah Hughes was born in Florence, Kentucky, where she attended Boone County High School. After graduating from high school, she attended Berea College in Berea, Kentucky, and graduated with a Bachelor of Arts in Broadcasting in 2010.

In 2012, Hughes moved to New York City, New York, and earned an Upright Citizens Brigade scholarship.

== Career ==
=== YouTube ===
On December 2, 2013, Hughes uploaded a comedy video, "Meet Your First Black Girlfriend," answering hypothetical questions from a white boyfriend, and it went viral. She was again recognized for releasing the video "On Intersectionality in Feminism and Pizza", that went viral after being uploaded on April 8, 2015.

On June 30, 2016, Hughes created a petition on Change.org titled "Ask Advertisers to Stop Supporting BuzzFeed Video's Idea Theft", which aimed to convince advertisers to stop supporting BuzzFeed Video. In the petition, described by The Washington Post as having gone viral, she argued, "BuzzFeed has been caught repeatedly stealing ideas, jokes, bits, gags, and therefore money from prominent YouTube creators."

In 2017, Hughes sued YouTuber Carl Benjamin (Sargon of Akkad) for copyright infringement after he used a portion of her Hillary Clinton election party footage. In August 2020, the judge, ruling Benjamin's video to be fair use criticism, dismissed the case with prejudice and ordered Hughes to pay Benjamin's legal costs.

In April 2020, Comedy Central's YouTube channel released three sketches starring Hughes and Milana Vayntrub as part of a new digital sketch series called Making Fun With Akilah and Milana.

=== Television ===
Hughes began appearing as herself on web series in 2014, with her first appearances coming in two episodes of mental_floss: The List Show. Between 2014 and 2017, she made various other appearances as herself on web series, including Vlogbrothers in 2015 and Project for Awesome 2016. In 2017, she hosted the first season of GK Now, a daily culinary news show for Genius Kitchen (now Food.com) for Scripps Network.

Her first appearance on a television series came during the U.S. midterm elections of 2018, when HBO aired four episodes of Crooked Media's Pod Save America, with Hughes as a correspondent.

In 2020, Hughes appeared as a panelist on the Syfy television series The Great Debate. That same year, she made her first appearance as an actress on a television series, when she provided the voice of Theresa in an episode of Bob's Burgers titled "Just the Trip".

=== Writing ===
In 2015, Hughes was awarded a fellowship from the Sundance Episodic Story Lab, with a half-hour comedy pilot titled Unlikely, co-written with Lyle Friedman.

Hughes began writing her first book in 2015, after a collaboration with Penguin Group for her Tipsy Book Reviews video series on YouTube led the publisher to offer her a book deal. The book, a collection of essays titled Obviously: Stories From My Timeline, was published on September 24, 2019, by Penguin Random House's Razorbill imprint. The book was included in PopSugar's "The 26 Best New Books You Need to Read This Fall", where writer Brenda Janowitz described the essays as "as hilarious as they are heart-warming." Writing for the Los Angeles Sentinel, Lapacazo Sandoval calls the book "very insightful and very, very funny".

In 2023, Hughes wrote for Steven Soderbergh's science fiction series Command Z, inspired by Kurt Andersen's 2020 book, Evil Geniuses: The Unmaking of America.

=== Hosting ===
In 2016, Hughes co-moderated the 2016 Brown & Black Democratic Presidential Forum on Fusion TV, alongside Jorge Ramos, Rembert Browne, and Alicia Menendez. Politicians participating in the event were 2016 United States presidential election Democratic candidates Hillary Clinton, Bernie Sanders, and Martin O'Malley.

Beginning in 2019, Hughes became the co-host of a newly launched daily news podcast from Crooked Media titled What a Day, alongside political journalist Gideon Resnick. The podcast's first episode, titled "Baghdadi and Blackouts", was released on October 28, 2019. What a Day won a Webby Award as the People's Voice Winner of "Best News & Politics Podcast" in 2021. The 412th episode of What a Day—released on July 30, 2021, and titled "Keeping The DREAM Alive"—was Hughes' final episode as co-host of the podcast.

As part of a newly signed deal in July 2023, iHeartMedia and Ninth Planet Audio announced the production of a podcast to be hosted by Hughes. On September 3, 2024, the podcast titled Rebel Spirit with Akilah Hughes premiered its first episode "A Homecoming". Rebel Spirit sees Hughes return to her hometown of Florence, Kentucky, where she attempts to convince her high school, Boone County High School, to change its confederate general mascot.

In April 2025, Rebel Spirit won the People's Voice Webby Award in the "Diversity, Equity, Inclusion & Belonging, Limited-Series & Specials (Podcasts)" category, for which it had been nominated earlier that month. The podcast won two 2025 Signal Awards for Comedy and Activism, Public Service, and Social Impact.

Hughes began hosting the podcast How Is This Better? for Courier Newsroom, which Courier announced on May 22, 2025, when its first episode was released May 30, 2025. The first episode, and each subsequent weekly episode, was released in both video and audio-only format. In the series, Hughes covers "everything from politics and culture to tech and late-stage capitalism," as Courier stated in the aforementioned announcement. The podcast won the 2026 Ambies Award for Best Emerging Podcast.

=== Film ===
Hughes made her feature film acting debut in 2023's Me, Myself & the Void, starring alongside a cast including Jack DeSena and Kelly Marie Tran, in the film directed by Tim Hautekiet.

== Personal life ==
Hughes was diagnosed with benign liver tumors in 2015, an illness for which she had surgery in July 2016. Using the crowdfunding website GoFundMe, she raised nearly $40,000, which covered 60% of the costs related to her surgery.

== Filmography ==
Film and television
Year	Title	Role	Notes
2014	Comic-Con All Access 2014	Self	Television special
2014	mental_floss: The List Show	Self - Host	Documentary web series; Episodes: "30 Weird Sports Injuries"; "26 Famous Art Heists"
2014	The Feels	Self	Web series
2015	Vlogbrothers	Self	Documentary web series
2016	Girl on Girl	Self	Web series
2016	Cooking in the Trap	Self	Web series
2016	Project for Awesome 2016	Self	Web special
2016	#Under35Potus	Self - Host	Documentary short film
2016	HelLA	Waitress	Web series; Episode: "LA vs NYC: Ordering Food"
2016	Sexy Anxious Girls		Short film
2017	Politically Re-Active	Self	Web series; Episode: "YouTube's Akilah Hughes on #BlackWomenAtWork & Feeding the Buzz"
2017	Manners Men	Self	Web series; Episode: "Akilah Hughes"
2017	GK Now	Self - Host	Web series
2018	Pod Save America	Self	Television series; Episodes: "Four-State Tour: Irvine, California"; "Four-State Tour: Philadelphia"; "Four-State Tour: Austin"; "Four-State Tour: Miami"
2019	Camp Confessions	Self	Web series; Episode: "Roger the Kangaroo Can Get It"
2019	Tales from the Trip	Self	Web series; Episode: "Akilah Hughes"
2020	Well, This Isn't Normal	Self	Web series; Episode: "Akilah Hughes on Sex in the Time of Rona"
2020	The Great Debate	Self - Panelist	Television series; Episode: "'Til Debate Do us Part"
2020	Bob's Burgers	Theresa	Animated television series; Voice only; Episode: "Just the Trip"
2023	Me, Myself & The Void		
2023	Command Z		Miniseries; Writer; Episode: "The Climate II"
2023	Pruning	Mia Phillips	Short film
2024	The Rookie	Wedding Planner	Episode: "The Hammer"
2025	Have I Got News for You	Self	
