= Command Z =

2023 American web series

- Inspired by: Evil Geniuses: The Unmaking of America: A Recent History by Kurt Andersen
- Developed by: Kurt Andersen; Sam Lowry; Larry Doyle
- Directed by: Steven Soderbergh
- Starring: Michael Cera; Liev Schreiber; Roy Wood Jr.; JJ Maley; Chloe Radcliffe; Kevin Pollak
- Country of origin: United States
- Original language: English

Production
- Production company: Extension 765

Original release
- Release: July 17, 2023

Command Z is a science fiction comedy web series directed by Steven Soderbergh. The series consists of eight episodes of varying lengths that ultimately comprise a 90-minute runtime.

== Cast ==
- Michael Cera as Kerning Fealty
- Roy Wood Jr. as Sam
- Chloe Radcliffe as Emma
- JJ Maley as Jamie
- Liev Schreiber as Kohlberg Pryce
- Kevin Pollak as Old Kerning Fealty
- Zoë Winters as Congresswoman Christina Martin
- Laura Seay as Astrid Jensen
- Catherine Curtin as Carol
- Stavros Halkias as Baz Diamandis
- Mike Houston as Bob Shiner
- Will Brill as Henry Humphrey
- Mike Birbiglia as the Time Traveler
- Sabrina Brier as Pura Shujaa
- Alexandra Socha as Pastor Caddy Winbrush
- James Naughton as Justice Frank Richardson

== Synopsis ==
A scientist tasks his employees with a "historic" mission to travel back in time to revise history and save the world.

== Production ==
In January 2023, Steven Soderbergh announced that he had filmed a science fiction satire series he was calling The Pendulum Project. It was shot in July and August 2022 between shooting Magic Mike's Last Dance and Full Circle in New York. The show was independently financed by Soderbergh, and it was inspired by Kurt Andersen's book Evil Geniuses: The Unmaking of America: A Recent History. Andersen co-created the series with former Simpsons writer Larry Doyle. It stars Michael Cera, Roy Wood Jr., Chloe Radcliffe, JJ Maley, and Liev Schreiber. Writers include Andersen, Doyle, Wood Jr, Radcliffe, Nell Scovell, Akilah Hughes, Jiehae Park, and Emily Flake.

== Release ==
A secret screening of Command Z was held on June 16, 2023, at the Metrograph in New York City before the series' release. It was officially released on July 17, 2023—the same date that the characters must travel back in time to in the show's universe. The series was made available for purchase on the website of Soderbergh's production company, Extension 765, and proceeds from the series are donated to Children's Aid and the Boston University Center for Antiracist Research.

== Reception ==
The Daily Beast critic Nick Schager wrote that "Soderbergh’s direction is snappy, playful, and efficient, and so too are the series’ scripts," writing that "nicely marries socio-political sharpness and jaded absurdity" to "deliver goofy laughs," yet "without ever resorting to sermonizing." Shannon Connellan at Mashable found the series to be a "superbly acted" thought-provoking series about how small changes can improve the future. "If you're looking for top-tier political, social, and economic commentary on how fucked up the world is, this is the bunch." Chase Hutchinson at Collider gave the series a B−, feeling that the series was sometimes charming but also feeling like Soderbergh used it more as an exercise that he wasn't taking seriously.

== Episodes ==
| No. | Title | Directed by | Written by | Original release date |
|---|---|---|---|---|
| 1 | "The Room" | Steven Soderbergh | Larry Doyle & Kurt Andersen | July 17, 2023 |
"More information" theme: Time travel; "More information" suggestions: The Terminator, Brother Future, Run Lola Run
| 2 | "The Climate" | Steven Soderbergh | Jiehae Park | July 17, 2023 |
"More information" theme: Climate change; "More information" suggestions: Soylent Green, The Day After Tomorrow, Ice Age: The Meltdown
| 3 | "The Pryce is Wrong" | Steven Soderbergh | Story by : Jiehae Park & Chloe Radcliffe; Teleplay by : Chloe Radcliffe | July 17, 2023 |
"More information" theme: Wall Street; "More information" suggestions: Wall Street, American Psycho, Hustlers
| 4 | "The Pryce is Wrong II" | Steven Soderbergh | Story by : Jiehae Park & Chloe Radcliffe; Teleplay by : Chloe Radcliffe | July 17, 2023 |
"More information" theme: Dogs; "More information" suggestions: Snoopy Come Home, Turner & Hooch, Hotel for Dogs
| 5 | "Antisocial Media" | Steven Soderbergh | Roy Wood Jr. | July 17, 2023 |
"More information" theme: Social media; "More information" suggestions: The Social Network, Ingrid Goes West, Die Influencers Die!
| 6 | "The Climate II" | Steven Soderbergh | Story by : Akilah Hughes & Chloe Radcliffe; Teleplay by : Chloe Radcliffe | July 17, 2023 |
"More information" theme: Nuclear energy; "More information" suggestions: The China Syndrome, Chernobyl, Atomic Hope
| 7 | "Preach" | Steven Soderbergh | Story by : Nell Scovell & Emily Flake; Teleplay by : Emily Flake | July 17, 2023 |
"More information" theme: God; "More information" suggestions: The Ten Commandments, Oh, God! You Devil, Evan Almighty
| 8 | "Back for the Future" | Steven Soderbergh | Kurt Andersen & Larry Doyle | July 17, 2023 |
