= The Swimmers (novel) =

2022 novel by Julie Otsuka

- Author: Julie Otsuka
- Genre: Literary fiction
- Publisher: Knopf
- Publication date: February 22, 2022
- Pages: 192
- ISBN: 978-0593321331
- Preceded by: The Buddha in the Attic

The Swimmers is a 2022 novel by American author Julie Otsuka, published by Knopf. Otsuka's third novel, it was written and finished during the onset of the COVID-19 pandemic. It won the Carnegie Medal for Excellence in Fiction in 2023.

According to Otsuka in a 2022 interview, the book is highly personal to her, noting that the events of the story closely parallel her own experiences such as her mother's diagnosis with Pick's Disease and her fascination for swimming. Otsuka says, "the seed of the novel was really just my own life."

== Synopsis ==
Written in a combination of first-person plural and second-person, the book follows Alice, an old swimmer with dementia whose troubles with memory involve her past experiences in a Japanese internment camps in the United States during World War II, as well as her daughter's attempts to care for her and reach her in her decline.

== Critical reception ==
In a starred review, Kirkus Reviews observed that "The combination of social satire with an intimate portrait of loss and grief is stylistically ambitious and deeply moving."

Many critics noted the bifurcated structure of the novel, with the Financial Times remarking: "Divided into two very different halves, The Swimmers is structured a bit like a lateralized brain, with distinctly rational and emotional sides in melancholy dialogue with one another."

Several publications, like The Atlantic, noted the poignancy of the novel's release during the COVID-19 pandemic. Rachel Khong, writing for The New York Times, found Otsuka's prose "powerfully subdued" and an "exquisite companion" to recent events. NPR called it "a slim brilliant novel about the value and beauty of mundane routines" that "could also be read as a grand parable about the crack in the world wrought by this pandemic." The Washington Independent Review of Books admired Otsuka's voice, structure, and approach to the topic of memory. The Los Angeles Review of Books observed that the novel, along with Jessica Au's Cold Enough for Snow, offered "new understandings of familiar dynamics" for Asian American identity politics in wake of the pandemic and its subsequent increase of hate crimes.

The Los Angeles Times found the novel's presence "cloying at times" but appreciated how "Otsuka's language lifts off" on her signature themes. The Spectator wrote that Otsuka "has good rhythm, sentences that move to a satisfying beat."

Vogue placed Otsuka's "elegant third novel" on their list of Best Books of 2022.
