= Turn of the century (disambiguation) =

Turn of the century refers to the change from one century to the next.

Turn of the Century may also refer to:

- Turn of the Century (När seklet var ungt), 1944 Swedish drama film directed by Gunnar Olsson
- Act 1: Turn of the Century in the 1964 Disney stage show Carousel of Progress
- "Turn of the Century" (1967), first track of Bee Gees' 1st, the 1st international album of the Bee Gees
- "Turn of the Century", a 1967 single by The Cyrkle
- Turn of the Century (roller coaster) (est. 1976), known today as Demon
- "Turn of the Century", a 1977 song by Yes
- "Turn of the Century" (song), a 1989 song by the Nitty Gritty Dirt Band
- Turn of the Century, a 1999 novel by Kurt Andersen
- The Turn of the Century, a 2001 Russian drama film directed by Konstantin Lopushansky

== See also ==
- Turn of My Century, 2002 album by guitarist and keyboardist Bob Katsionis
- End of the Century (disambiguation)
- Fin de siècle (disambiguation)
