= End of the Century (disambiguation) =

End of the Century is a 1980 album by the Ramones.

End of the Century may also refer to:

- The End of the Twentieth Century (Das Ende des 20. Jahrhunderts), 1983 monumental installation by artist Joseph Beuys at the Hamburger Bahnhof, in Berlin, Germany
- A Century Ends, a 1993 album by David Gray
- "End of a Century", a 1994 song by Blur
- End of the Century (Boris the Sprinkler album), a 1996 album that is a complete cover of the Ramones album
- End of the Century: The Story of the Ramones, a 2003 documentary film about the Ramones
- End of the Century (film), a 2019 Argentine film

== See also ==
- Turn of the century (disambiguation)
- Fin de siècle (disambiguation), French for "end of century"
