= Anne Kreamer =

American journalist and author (born 1955)

Anne Kreamer (born 1955) is an American journalist and author who specializes in business, work/life balance, culture, and women's issues.

== Biography ==
Kreamer grew up in Kansas City, Missouri, and graduated from Harvard College.

After graduating from college, she spent the first half of her career as a media executive and entrepreneur working in international sales for Children's Television Workshop during its first globalizing phase, selling the program in English throughout Southeast Asia and the Caribbean as well as helping to inaugurate co-productions of Sesame Street in Mexico, Spain, France and Germany. She became director of development for CBS Educational and Professional Publishing.

In 1986, she joined her husband, Kurt Andersen, Graydon Carter, and Thomas Philips as part of the team founding Spy magazine. In 1990 she joined Gerry Laybourne as executive vice-president and worldwide creative director for the cable TV channels Nickelodeon and Nick at Nite, where she conceived and launched Nickelodeon Magazine, as well as launching Nickelodeon's toy and consumer product business.

In the early 2000s, she became a columnist for Fast Company, Martha Stewart Living Omnimedia, and has also written for The New York Times, The Wall Street Journal and Time. Among other publications, she blogs regularly for The Harvard Business Review and NextAvenue.org.

She is on the board of trustees of the Frank Lloyd Wright Foundation.

== Books ==
In 2007 she published Going Gray: What I Learned about Beauty, Sex, Work, Motherhood, Authenticity and Everything Else That Really Matters (Little, Brown and Company, ISBN 978-0-316-16661-4) and in 2011, It's Always Personal: Navigating Emotion in the New Workplace (Random House, ISBN 978-0812979930).

== Personal life ==
Kreamer lives in Brooklyn, New York, with her husband, the writer Kurt Andersen, who was also host of the Peabody Award-winning PRI program Studio 360, and their two daughters, Kate and Lucy.
