= Albatros Literaturpreis =

International literary prize for a translated novel, poetry or essays

- Native name: Internationaler Literaturpreis Albatros
- Awarded for: High literary quality and cultural and socio-political relevance
- Description: International literary award for contemporary authors and their translators
- Country: Germany
- Presented by: Günter Grass Foundation
- Rewards: €40,000 (split between author and translator)
- Established: 2006
- Final award: 2014

Albatros Literaturpreis (or Internationaler Literaturpreis Albatros) was an international literary award given every two years by the Günter Grass Foundation based in Bremen, Germany. It was awarded only five times. The award was for contemporary authors in prose, poetry or essay writing including translated works. The prize was €40,000 split between author (€25,000) and translator (€15,000).

The award went "to authors from around the world whose work is characterized by high literary quality and cultural and socio-political relevance." In addition to "the excellent work of open thinking and the free discussion of all aspects of our lives, carrying with our world and our time". Is also awarded to an outstanding translator who translated the work into German. The panel was convened by the Günter Grass Foundation. The right to nominate the winners lied exclusively with the jury. The award ceremony took place in Bremen.

== Honorees ==
- 2006 Lidia Jorge (Author), Karin von Schweder-Schreiner (Translator), for her previous novels
- 2008 Bora Ćosić (Author), Catherine Wolf Grießhaber (Translator), for his work to date
- 2010 David Grossman (Author), Anne Birch Hauer (Translator) for his novel Eine Frau flieht vor einer Nachricht
- 2012 Dave Eggers (Author), Ulrike Wasel and Klaus Timmermann (Translator), for Zeitoun
- 2014 Julie Otsuka (Author), Katja Scholtz (Translator), for Wovon wir träumten
