= Whitney Strub =

Academic

Academic background
- Education: UCLA (PhD, 2006)

Whitney Strub is a professor and author in the United States. As of 2026, Strub is an Associate Professor at Rutgers University–Newark in the departments of American studies, history, and women's and gender studies. He is also the director of the university's film studies minor. His research focuses on the modern history of the United States; the history of sexuality; LGBT history; and film, legal, political, and cultural history.

== Education ==
Strub received his Doctor of Philosophy in United States history from the University of California, Los Angeles in 2006.

== Career ==
Strub has taught at the University of Miami, California State University, Fullerton, the University of California, Los Angeles, Temple University, and Rutgers University–Newark. As of 2026, he is an associate professor at Rutgers in the departments of American studies, history, and women's and gender studies. He is also the director of the university's film studies minor. His research focuses on the modern history of the United States; the history of sexuality; LGBT history; and film, legal, political, and cultural history.

Strub is the author of Perversion for Profit: The Politics of Pornography and the Rise of the New Right (2010) and Obscenity Rules: Roth v. United States and the Long Struggle over Sexual Expression (2013). He has also edited Porno Chic and the Sex Wars: American Sexual Representation in the 1970s (2016) with Carolyn Bronstein, ReFocus: The Films of Roberta Findlay (2023) with Peter Alilunas, and Queer Newark: Stories of Resistance, Love, and Community (2024).

=== Perversion for Profit (2010) ===
Perversion for Profit: The Politics of Pornography and the Rise of the New Right was published by Columbia University Press in 2010. The book explores the rise of the New Right in the United States in the 1960s and how this was impacted by pornography. The book moves from the anti-pornography group Citizens for Decent Literature in the 1960s to "the sexual revolution, feminist activism, the rise of the gay rights movement, the 'porno chic' moment of the early 1970s, and resurgent Christian conservatism, which now shapes public policy far beyond the issue of sexual decency."

According to Gillian Frank, writing for the Journal of the History of Sexuality, "Perversion for Profit forcefully demonstrates how anxieties about pornography empowered politicians, enabled the constitution of sexual ideologies, and rationalized new forms of regulation that ultimately fueled the emergence of the New Right and fractured postwar liberalism". Writing in The American Historical Review, David K. Johnson highlighted how the book "creates a clear national narrative without losing sight of the particular".

=== Obscenity Rules (2013) ===
Obscenity Rules: Roth v. United States and the Long Struggle over Sexual Expression was published by University Press of Kansas in 2013. The book discusses the history of obscenity laws in the United States that ultimately led to the 1957 Roth v. United States court case, which resulted featured Samuel Roth, who had been repeatedly jailed for obscene materials. The landmark decision of the Supreme Court of the United States redefined the constitutional test for determining what constitutes obscene material unprotected by the First Amendment. Throughout the book, Strub discusses the history of the case, the influences of anti-vice activists like Anthony Comstock, and the ultimate outcome, alongside the social context of the Kinsey Reports, Kefauver hearings, and free speech debates.

Reviewers generally praised the book. Douglas M. Charles, writing for the Journal of American Studies, described Obscenity Rules as "thorough, written with [Strub's] usual flair, and thoughtful". On behalf of Library Journal, Scott Vieira recommended the book "to those interested in free speech and obscenity, as well as to those interested in publishing, law and culture, and the U.S. Supreme Court".

In 2013, Obscenity Rules won the Langum Prize for Legal History/Biography.

=== Porno Chic and the Sex Wars (2016) ===
Porno Chic and the Sex Wars: American Sexual Representation in the 1970s, co-edited with Carolyn Bronstein, was published by the University of Massachusetts Press in 2016. The book is separated into four sections: "Films", "Magazines/Print Culture", "Political Contexts of Pornography", and "Preserving Pornography: History, Memory, Legacy". It explores the proliferation of pornographic material in the 1970s, ranging from film to magazine, as well as the cultural forces that impacted its rise and fall. While focusing on distinct forms of pornography, the collection highlights the emergence of gay and transgender pornography, as well as porn for women and Christians.

The book received mixed reviews. According to David Church, writing in Porn Studies, "All of the essays in Porno Chic and the Sex Wars are deeply grounded in historicizing the era's pornographic productions, making this collection required reading for historians of adult film and media". Church specifically noted the authors' contributions in discussing topics related to race, class and queerness. David Allyn, writing for The Journal of American History, found "some of the essays ... illuminating", while noting that others "are less successful". Allyn praised Strub's essay analyzing the attitudinal changes in the 1970s and how these were "reinforced and exploited by pornographers", but criticized other essays he felt proved that "no single pornographic production is worthy of such scholarly attention".

== Books ==
- Strub, Whitney (2010). Perversion for Profit: The Politics of Pornography and the Rise of the New Right. Edinburgh: Columbia University Press. ISBN 978-0-231-14886-3.
- Strub, Whitney (2013). Obscenity Rules: Roth v. United States and the Long Struggle over Sexual Expression. Edinburgh: University Press of Kansas. ISBN 978-0-700-61937-5.
- Bronstein, Carolyn; Strub, Whitney, eds. (2016). Porno Chic and the Sex Wars: American Sexual Representation in the 1970s. University of Massachusetts Press. ISBN 978-1-625-34226-3.
- Alilunas, Peter; Strub, Whitney, eds. (2023). ReFocus: The Films of Roberta Findlay. Edinburgh: Edinburgh University Press. ISBN 978-1-474-49746-6.
- Strub, Whitney, ed. (2024). Queer Newark: Stories of Resistance, Love and Community. Newark: Rutgers University Press.
