= Fantasyland: How America Went Haywire =

Non-fiction book by Kurt Andersen

Fantasyland: How America Went Haywire; A 500-Year History
- First edition
- Author: Kurt Andersen
- Language: English
- Published: 2017
- Publisher: Random House
- Publication place: United States
- ISBN: 978-1400067213
- Website: www.kurtandersen.com/fantasyland

Fantasyland: How America Went Haywire; A 500-Year History is an American non-fiction book written by Kurt Andersen and published in 2017. Fantasyland debuted on the New York Times bestseller list at number 3 and at number 5 on the Washington Post and Publishers Weekly bestseller lists (hardcover non-fiction). Andersen has said that he had been thinking about the topic of Americans becoming "too accommodating to belief" for several years, but that the derisive term "reality-based community" was "a wake-up call" that motivated him to write Fantasyland.

== Summary ==
Fantasyland is organized into six sections, detailing the spread of magical thinking throughout the country's history to illustrate how the state of the nation today is an extension of fundamental American characteristics. Andersen describes the overall arc of the book:

America was created by true believers and passionate dreamers, by hucksters and their suckers—which over the course of four centuries has made us susceptible to fantasy...In other words: mix epic individualism with extreme religion; mix show business with everything else; let all that steep and simmer for a few centuries; run it through the anything-goes 1960s and the Internet age; the result is the America we inhabit today, where reality and fantasy are weirdly and dangerously blurred and commingled.

=== Part I: The Conjuring of America: 1517–1789 ===
Fantasyland contends that the earliest European settlers in what would become the United States were gold-crazed adventurers (Jamestown) and God-crazed cults (Puritans and Pilgrims). Part I covers iconoclastic religious figures such as; Anne Hutchinson, Roger Williams, John Wesley, George Whitefield, and Jonathan Edwards; and events such as the Salem witch trials and the First Great Awakening. It points out that the emerging Age of Enlightenment with its emphasis on freedom of thought "liberated people to believe anything whatsoever".

=== Part II: United States of Amazing: The 1800s ===
The 19th century saw a mythologizing of the country's founding and founders, and a proliferation of religious sects including; Ann Lee and the Shakers, Joseph Smith and the Mormons, Mary Baker Eddy and Christian Science. Additional religious extremes included the Second Great Awakening, a huge camp meeting at Cane Ridge, the Restoration Movement, and end-of-world prophecies. Occult beliefs, such as the Fox sisters, were common. The century introduced homeopathy; medical fads, and snake oil peddlers; mesmerism, phrenology, and hydropathy; Dr. Thomas' Eclectric Oil, William Rockefeller Sr.'s elixirs, and Brandreth's pills. Andersen discusses the "get rich quick" idealism of the California Gold Rush and westward expansion. Self-serving fictions on both sides of the Civil War grew in popularity, as did pastoral fantasies (Daniel Boone, Henry David Thoreau). Steam-powered presses spawned large-circulation newspapers and magazines with loose standards of accuracy and truth for both advertising and reporting (Great Moon Hoax). Fantastical entertainments were spawned: P.T. Barnum and his American Museum, Hamlin's Wizard Oil Company and Kickapoo Indian Medicine Company, and Buffalo Bill Cody and his travelling Wild West show.

=== Part III: A Long Arc Bending Toward Reason: 1900–1960 ===
Reason began fighting back: the Pure Food and Drug Act was passed; Jacobson v. Massachusetts found for mandatory vaccinations; the NAACP was founded; Time laid a course for the American Century; Gilbert Seldes' The Stammering Century was "a rationalist's good-riddance epitaph for the last vestiges of America's ridiculous magical-thinking 1800s"; debunking of spiritualism was a popular pastime; the ACLU was formed.

On the other side, there were brief conspiracy panics (against Germans and then against Communists which then edged into anti-Semitism, with Henry Ford becoming a fan of The Protocols of the Elders of Zion). Nostalgia for Antebellum South spread; The Birth of a Nation was released; an African American show that recreated an idealized version of slave life toured the country; and the Ku Klux Klan was revived.

Fundamentalism in religion grew in popularity: Billy Sunday, Cyrus Scofield, Dwight Moody, Scopes Trial, Holiness movement, Father Divine, and Aimee Semple McPherson. Movies and the fantasy-industrial complex (example: The War of the Worlds) became more prevalent, bringing a greater amount of fiction into people's lives. There was an explosion in advertising and modern celebrity culture. The spread of suburbia (Broadacre City) provided a bucolic fantasy. Other developments that encouraged magical thinking were television; Las Vegas, Disneyland; Playboy; the Beat Generation; Scientology, McCarthyism; Billy Graham; The Power of Positive Thinking; Oral Roberts; orgone therapy; and psychotropic drugs and tranquilizers.

=== Part IV: Big Bang: The 1960s and '70s ===
The 1960s and '70s were a time when bits of everyday life were being replaced with bits of everyday fiction, and there was a veritable explosion of woo-based ideologies taking hold: Alan Watts, Transcendental Meditation, Esalen, New Age, The Myth of Mental Illness, Jane Roberts; ESP, mysticism, and magic; UFOs and aliens, Chariots of the Gods; The Greening of America, The Electric Kool-Aid Acid Test, The Secret Life of Plants, and Madness and Civilization. The books Against Method: Outline of an Anarchistic Theory of Knowledge, and The Structure of Scientific Revolutions encouraged skepticism of science.

Woodstock, the Counterculture, and hippies encouraged free thinking and finding one's own truth. The U.S. was fascinated with the spiritual adventures of Carlos Castaneda. Religious developments included the Jesus movement, the Charismatic movement, The Genesis Flood, Institute for Creation Research, and the rerelease of the Scofield Reference Bible. None Dare Call It Treason and None Dare Call It Conspiracy helped launch a new explosion in conspiracy theories. Both fundamentalist and counterculture homeschooling became popular. Fuzzing the line between reality and magical thinking were laugh tracks, fantastical TV shows (The Twilight Zone, The Outer Limits, The Flintstones, The Jetsons, Bewitched, I Dream of Jeannie, Dark Shadows, My Favorite Martian, Batman), and a wider spread of science fiction and fantasy. Attention to satanism was renewed.

People could escape their mundane lives in living history theme parks, Civil War reenactments, and Renaissance fairs; through Dungeons & Dragons, fan fiction, and Comic Con. Celebrity obsession grew even greater. There was a glut of theming: restaurants, malls, and architecture. State lotteries encouraged magical thinking. Erotica and pornography became commonplace, and there was a vast increase in hair coloring and cosmetic surgery.

=== Part V: Fantasyland Scales: From the 1980s Through the Turn of the Century ===
The strange had become unremarkable and the amazing had become ubiquitous. Make-believe became part of ordinary life.

Reality TV was ubiquitous and there was a huge jump in popularity of pro-wrestling. Even more extreme forms of cosmetic surgery became common. Casinos spread outside of Nevada to nearly every state. Escapists could enjoy Burning Man, live action role-playing, fantasy sports, and fantasy camps for adults. The country had a first lady's astrologer and a Hollywood president who frequently referred to the apocalypse and was said to practice "voodoo economics". Politics became entertainment.

The FCC fairness doctrine was eliminated, ushering in Rush Limbaugh and Fox News. New conspiracy theories took hold, and there was renewed interest in occultism, fringe science, and angels. Megachurches were launched and there was a growth of evangelicals. Approaching Hoofbeats: Horsemen of the Apocalypse, The Coming Antichrist, the Last Days Handbook, the Left Behind series all spoke to a growing fascination with the Apocalypse. School districts proposed the teaching of Creationism and intelligent design. There was a growing increase in beliefs in prosperity gospel and spiritual warfare and New Age notions such as crystals, chakras, Reiki, and channeling. Oprah recommended The Secret and Dr. Oz. The National Center for Complementary and Integrative Health funded research into areas such as homeopathy and long-distance spiritual healing. There was an expansion of relativism. Cable TV showed documentaries on mermaids, zombies, ghosts, and alien abductions. Home-schooling doubled, mostly because of religious beliefs. Interest in survivalism and preppers surged, leading to American Redoubt.

The Internet enabled every person access to every conceivable idea and interest, connecting them to like-minded people. "Delusional ideas and magical thinking flood from the private sphere into the public, become so pervasive and deeply rooted, so normal, that they affect everyone."

=== Part VI: The Problem with Fantasyland: From the 1980s to the Present and Beyond ===
Fantasyland contends that two changes in American society led to modern tipping points: the counterculture of the 1960s and the Information Age. The internet and world wide web permitted all manner of ideas to bypass the traditional gatekeepers of information dissemination. By discrediting authority and its validating institutions, people have been taught that nothing can be trusted.

During these decades, there was a rash of child abduction panics. Recovered-memory therapy raised fears of Satanic ritual abuse. There was a vast increase in the number of dissociative identity disorder diagnoses. People engaged in past life regressions. Communion: A True Story brought alien abductions to the wider public, and more experiencers shared their stories, encouraged by UFOlogy, talk radio, and Art Bell.

Conspiracy theories spread about the Illuminati, New World Order, Fusion paranoia, Agenda 21, birtherism, 9/11, Shariah: The Threat To America, GMOs; vaccinations, and The Greatest Hoax: How the Global Warming Conspiracy Threatens Your Future. The X-Files were wildly popular. Alex Jones's radio show is syndicated nationally. Fundamentalist Christianity is amplified in the GOP and Libertarianism becomes more popular. Dog-whistle politics are more blatant. The alt-right enters the political conversation. There is a greater push for dominionism, and opposition to any gun restrictions by the NRA. People participate in MMORPGs, virtual reality and augmented reality, and MilSim. A fantasy-tinged suburb is created in Celebration, Florida. Investors engage in irrational exuberance and economic magical thinking. Extreme skepticism of the press is widespread as people lose immunity to false information. Andersen then analyzes the election of Donald Trump within the greater context of America's descent into a mindset in which facts are relative and there is no shared reality.

== Reception ==
Ronald H. Fritze, writing in Choice Reviews, recommended Fantasyland as both compelling and entertaining: "Not everyone will like what Andersen has to say, but he has written a fine work of history that convincingly explains how we got to where we are today." In the New York Times Book Review, Hanna Rosin admired how Andersen weaves historical threads that help make sense of the 2016 United States presidential election, but pointed out that he "goes for wide rather than deep."

In the Boston Globe, Michael Upchurch criticized the lack of bibliography, but said "Fantasyland offers a clear, persuasive historical framework" and calls the prose "lucid, supple, and powered by paradox". Carlos Lozada of The Washington Post declared Fantasyland the "most irritating book" of 2017, calling it "more fleeting and glib than helpful and revealing", and takes exception to what he considers Andersen's "contempt for people of faith".
