= John Shannon (defensive lineman) =

American football player (born 1965)

No. 75, 71
- Position: Defensive end

Personal information
- Born: January 18, 1965 (age 61); Lexington, Kentucky, U.S.
- Listed height: 6 ft 3 in (1.91 m)
- Listed weight: 225 lb (102 kg)

Career information
- High school: Florence (KY) Boone Co.
- College: Kentucky
- NFL draft: 1988: undrafted

Career history
- Chicago Bears (1988–1989); San Francisco 49ers (1990–1991)*; → London Monarchs (1991-1992); Orlando Predators (1993)
- * Offseason or practice squad member only
- Stats at Pro Football Reference

John Byron Shannon (born January 18, 1965) is an American former professional football defensive lineman. He played two seasons for the Chicago Bears.
