= Fin de siècle (disambiguation) =

Fin de siècle is a French term meaning the end of the century.

Fin de siècle may also refer to:

- Fin de Siècle (album), 1998 pop album by The Divine Comedy
- Fin de siecle (album), 2000 Gothic rock album by Closterkeller
- Fin de siècle (song), a song by French rock band Noir Désir, part of 1996 album 666.667 Club, released as a single in 1998
- Fin-de-siècle Vienna, 1980 non-fiction book by Carl E. Schorske
- Fin-de-Siècle Museum, in Brussels, Belgium, dedicated to arts between 1884 and 1914

== See also ==
- End of the Century (disambiguation)
- Turn of the century (disambiguation)
