= Samuel Walker (police accountability expert) =

American police accountability expert, civil liberties activist, author

- Born: Samuel Emlen Walker; December 19, 1942 (age 83); Indianapolis, Indiana U.S.
- Occupations: Civil liberties, policing, and criminal justice expert
- Years active: 1964-present

Samuel Emlen Walker (born December 19, 1942) is an American civil liberties, policing, and criminal justice expert. He specializes in the history of police and police accountability.

== Early life and education ==
Walker was born in Indianapolis, Indiana, but grew up in Shaker Heights, Ohio. His father was an executive who worked for the railroad.

In December 1964, Walker received a B.A. in American Culture from the University of Michigan, where he wrote film reviews for The Michigan Daily student newspaper for a semester. In 1970, Walker received an M.A. in American history from University of Nebraska Omaha. In 1973, he earned a PhD in American history from Ohio State University. His thesis was on Terence V. Powderly, and was called "Terence V. Powderly, "Labour Mayor": Workingmen's Politics in Scranton, Pennsylvania 1870-1884". His thesis advisor was K. Austin Kerr.

== Career ==
=== Mississippi Freedom Summer ===
In the spring of 1964, civil rights activist Robert "Bob" Moses visited the University of Michigan-Ann Arbor in a drive to recruit students like Walker to go to Mississippi as part of the Council of Federated Organizations (COFO)'s Mississippi Freedom Summer. After orientation/training in Ohio and raising US$500 for bail, for six weeks in the summer of 1964 starting in June 1964, Walker worked as a volunteer, going on door-to-door voter registration drives to encourage African American citizens to register to vote. Part of the effort was to highlight the restrictions on voter registration and to establish a non-violent right to organize and empower in the face of institutional terrorism of the Black community in Mississippi.

After graduating from college, Walker returned to Mississippi in January 1965 to continue the Mississippi Freedom Project. Walker was based in Gulfport, Mississippi until August 1966.

=== Teaching ===
From 1969 to 1970, Walker was a teaching assistant at the University of Nebraska Omaha (UNO) while earning his master's degree. From 1970 to 1973, he was a teaching associate at Ohio State University while working on his PhD. In August 1974, Walker was hired as an assistant professor of criminal justice at UNO, eventually becoming a professor of criminal justice in 1984. From 1993 to 1999, he was Kiewit Professor, and then from 1999 to 2005, he was Isaacson Professor. Walker retired as a professor emeritus in 2005. He continues to work as a consultant.

Walker has said that he started out with a focus on police-community relations. That expanded into the area of citizen oversight of the police, and eventually became a specialization of concentrating on police accountability.

=== Civil liberties expert ===
In 2000, Walker was hired to work on a grant funded report for the U.S. Department of Justice called Early Intervention Systems for Law Enforcement Agencies: A Planning and Management Guide, published in 2004.

In 2013, Walker testified in New York City as an expert against the NYPD's policy of stop and frisk.

From 2015 to 2016, Walker worked as a consultant to the Royal Canadian Mounted Police in Ottawa, Ontario on a project for the development of an Early Intervention System (EIS) for its police force.

Walker has created the Police Accountability Resource Guide, an online guide with links and resources for educators and organizers.

== Membership ==
- 1964: Ann Arbor Friends of SNCC, spokesman
- 2001-2004: National Academy of Sciences, Panel Member for "Fairness and Effectiveness in Policing: The Evidence"
- 2015–present: American Law Institute (ALI), Advisory Committee Member on Principles of Law: Police Investigations
- 2015-2016: National Academy of Sciences, Consultant on "Project of Proactive Policing"

== Awards ==
- 2012: Langum Prize, David J. Langum Sr. Prize in American Legal History or Biography for Presidents and Civil Liberties From Wilson to Obama
- 2018: Academic Freedom Coalition of Nebraska (AFCON), Academic Freedom Award
- 2018: American Society of Criminology (ASC) Division of Policing, Lifetime Achievement Award

== Selected works and publications ==
=== Selected works ===
- Walker, Samuel Emlen (1973). Terence V. Powderly, "Labour Mayor": Workingmen's Politics in Scranton, Pennsylvania 1870-1884 (PhD). Ohio State University. OCLC 973331728. ProQuest 302707706.
- Walker, Samuel (1977). A Critical History of Police Reform: The Emergence of Professionalism. Lexington, MA: Lexington Books. ISBN 978-0-669-01292-7. OCLC 869372240.
- Walker, Samuel (1992). The American Civil Liberties Union: An Annotated Bibliography. New York: Garland Publishing. ISBN 978-0-815-30047-2. OCLC 25048220. – part of Garland Reference Library of Social Science, Organizations and Interest Groups v. 743, 3
- Walker, Samuel (1993). Taming the System: The Control of Discretion in Criminal Justice, 1950-1990. New York: Oxford University Press. ISBN 978-0-195-07820-6. OCLC 26012412.
- Walker, Samuel (1994). Hate Speech: The History of an American Controversy. Lincoln, NE: University of Nebraska Press. ISBN 978-0-803-2476-35. OCLC 28419843.
- Walker, Samuel (1998). The Rights Revolution: Rights and Community in Modern America. New York: Oxford University Press. ISBN 978-1-602-56627-9. OCLC 559885444.
- Walker, Samuel (1998). Popular Justice: A History of American Criminal Justice (2nd ed.). New York: Oxford University Press. ISBN 978-0-195-07450-5. OCLC 36407878.
- Walker, Samuel (1999). In Defense of American Liberties: A History of the ACLU (2nd ed.). Carbondale, IL: Southern Illinois University Press. ISBN 978-0-809-32270-1. OCLC 40675103.
- Walker, Samuel (2001). Police Accountability: The Role of Citizen Oversight. Belmont, CA: Wadsworth Thompson Learning. ISBN 978-0-534-58158-9. OCLC 44876949.
- Walker, Samuel (2004). Civil Liberties in America: A Reference Handbook. Santa Barbara, CA: ABC-CLIO. ISBN 978-1-576-07927-0. OCLC 469328124.
- Walker, Samuel E. (2005). The New World of Police Accountability (1st ed.). Thousand Oaks, CA: SAGE Publications, Inc. ISBN 978-1-412-90943-3. OCLC 56334321.
- Walker, Samuel (2006). Sense and Nonsense About Crime and Drugs: A Policy Guide (6th ed.). Belmont, CA: Thomson/Wadsworth. ISBN 978-0-534-61654-0. OCLC 64442729.
- Walker, Samuel (2012). Presidents and Civil Liberties from Wilson to Obama: A Story of Poor Custodians. Cambridge: Cambridge University Press. ISBN 978-1-107-01660-6. OCLC 809195598.
- Walker, Samuel; Katz, Charles M. (2018). The Police in America: An Introduction (9th ed.). New York: McGraw-Hill Education. ISBN 978-1-259-14076-1. OCLC 967939018.
- Walker, Samuel; Spohn, Cassia; DeLone, Miriam (2018). The Color of Justice: Race, Ethnicity, and Crime in America (6th ed.). Boston, MA: Cengage Learning. ISBN 978-1-337-09186-2. OCLC 954105208.
- Walker, Samuel E.; Archbold, Carol A. (2019). The New World of Police Accountability (3rd ed.). Thousand Oaks, CA: SAGE Publications, Inc. ISBN 978-1-544-33919-1. OCLC 1090424574.

=== Selected publications ===
- Walker, Sam (5 September 1963). "At Cinema Guild: 'Falcon' Moves Fast". The Michigan Daily. 74 (4): Image 4.
- Walker, Sam; Else, John (July 1965). A Report and Analysis of Community Organizing in Gulport, Mississippi: July 1965 (PDF). Gulfport, MS: Council of Federated Organizations (COFO) – via Civil Rights Movement Archive.
- Walker, Samuel (Spring 2001). "Searching for the Denominator: Problems with Police Traffic Stop Data and an Early Warning System Solution" (PDF). Justice Research and Policy. 3 (1): 63–95. doi:10.3818/JRP.3.1.2001.63. S2CID 76655168.
- Walker, Samuel (2003). "The New Paradigm of Police Accountability: The U.S. Justice Department "Pattern or Practice" Suits in Context" (PDF). Saint Louis University Public Law Review. XXII (1): 3–52.
- Walker, Samuel (2004). Early Intervention Systems for Law Enforcement Agencies: A Planning and Management Guide (PDF). Washington, D.C.: U.S. Dept. of Justice, Office of Community Oriented Policing Services. ISBN 978-1-932-58226-0. OCLC 714810836.
- Walker, Samuel; Keenan, Kevin M. (Spring 2005). "An Impediment to Police Accountability? An Analysis of Statutory Law Enforcement Officers' Bills of Rights" (PDF). Boston University Public Interest Law Review. 14 (2): 185–245.
- Walker, Samuel; Milligan, Stacy Osnick; Berke, Anna (2006). Strategies for Intervening with Officers Through Early Intervention Systems: A Guide for Front-Line Supervisors (PDF). Washington, D.C.: Police Executive Research Forum, U.S. Dept. of Justice Office of Community Oriented Policing Services. ISBN 978-1-878-73493-8. OCLC 73830385.
- Walker, Samuel (Spring 2006). "Too Many Sticks, Not Enough Carrots: Limits and New Opportunities in American Crime Policy" (PDF). University of St. Thomas Law Journal. 3 (3): 430–461.
- Walker, Samuel (8 September 2016). "Science and Politics in Police Research: Reflections on Their Tangled Relationship" (PDF). The Annals of the American Academy of Political and Social Science. 593 (1): 137–155. doi:10.1177/0002716203262699. S2CID 145782450.
- Walker, Samuel. "Police Accountability Resource Guide". Samuel Walker.
