= Boone County High School =

Coordinates: 39°0′19.93″N 84°37′52.05″W

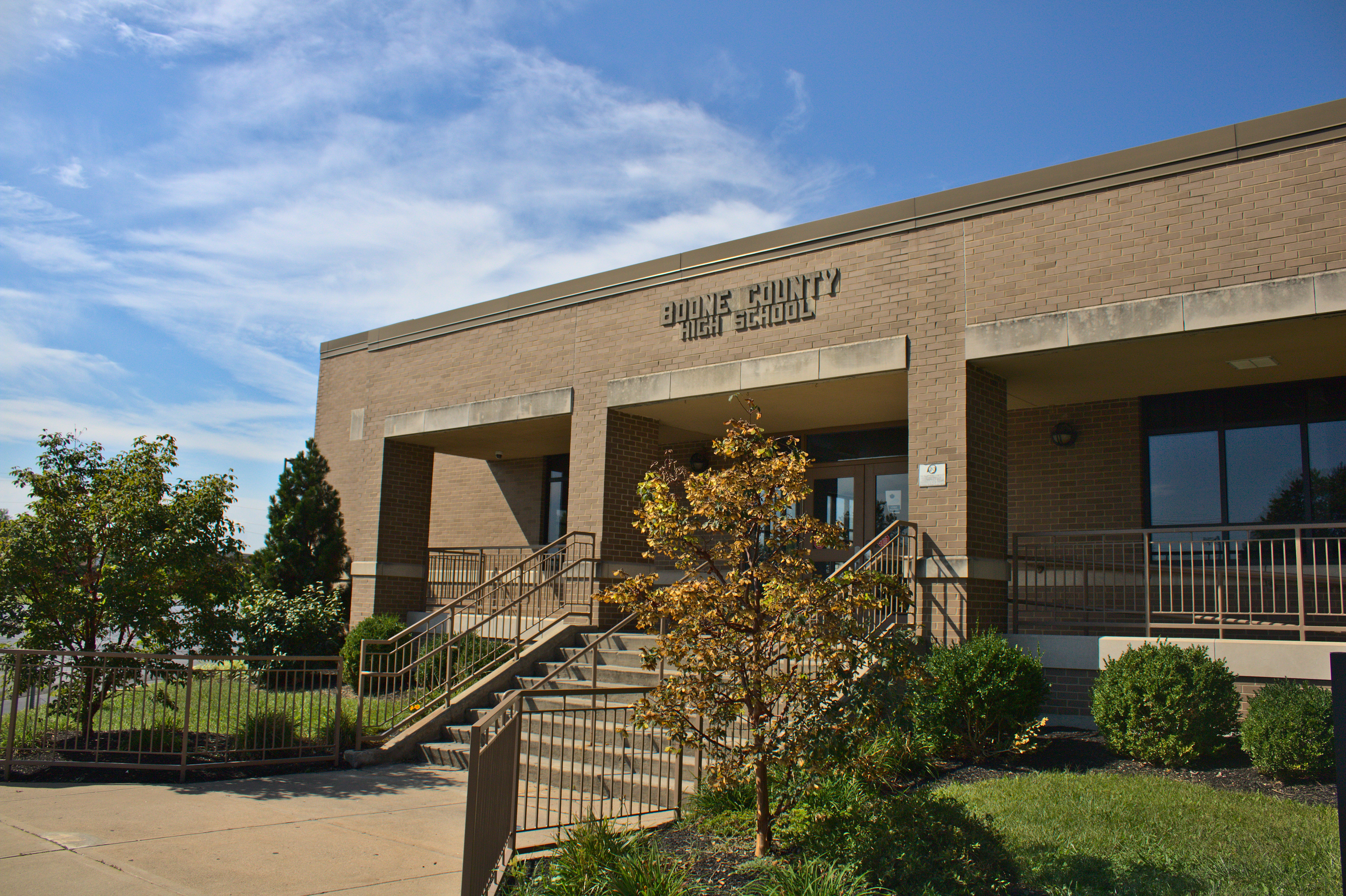
- 7056 Burlington Pike, Florence KY; United States

Information
- Type: Public secondary
- Established: 1954
- School district: Boone County Schools
- Teaching staff: 89.00 (FTE)
- Enrollment: 1,299 (2023–2024)
- Student to teacher ratio: 14.60
- Colors: Navy Blue, Columbia Blue and White
- Mascot: Rebel
- Website: https://bchs.boone.kyschools.us/

Boone County High School is located in Florence, Kentucky, United States. The school was opened in 1954, consolidating Burlington, Florence, New Haven and Hebron High Schools.

== Sports ==
Boone County High School is known for its athletics. Both men's and women's basketball have been among the strongest programs in the region. Baseball has also been quite strong as they won the 33rd district tournament and the 9th region tournament in 2010. The men's team once placed fourth out of five teams in a winter classic invitational tournament held in Cheyenne, Wyoming.

Boone County is known for its football tradition as well. In 2008 the Rebels went all the way to the semi-finals, in 2009 they went to the third round of the playoffs, and in 2010 that team made it all the way to the semi-finals.

== Notable alumni ==
- Shaun Alexander, former football player for the Seattle Seahawks
- Thaddeus Moss, football player for the Birmingham Stallions
- Irv Goode, former football Offensive Lineman for the NFL
- Ace (gamer), professional American Halo player
- Akilah Hughes; writer, comedian, and actress
- John Shannon, former football player for the Chicago Bears
- Adrian Belew, King Crimson guitarist

== Mascot controversy ==
On September 3, 2024, a podcast titled Rebel Spirit with Akilah Hughes premiered its first episode "A Homecoming". Rebel Spirit sees Boone County High School alumni Akilah Hughes return to her hometown of Florence, Kentucky, where she attempts to convince the high school to change its confederate general mascot.
