= Daniel Magariel =

American novelist

- Education: Columbia University; Syracuse University
- Occupation: Novelist
- Writing career
- Notable work: One of the Boys; Walk the Darkness Down
- Website: danielmagariel.com

Daniel Magariel is an American novelist. He is the author of One of the Boys and Walk the Darkness Down.

== Early life and education ==
Magariel grew up in Kansas City. He received his bachelor's from Columbia University and Master of Fine Arts from Syracuse University, where he studied with George Saunders.

== Career ==
Magariel released his debut novel, One of the Boys, in March 2017. It received starred reviews in Kirkus and Publishers Weekly, as well as reviews in The Guardian, Rolling Stone, The New York Times, and NPR. Columbia called it one of the ten best books ever written at The Hungarian Pastry Shop.

Magariel's sophomore novel, Walk the Darkness Down, was released in August 2023. Magariel spent a few weeks at sea on a commercial fishing boat to research the novel, which Literary Hub named one of their most anticipated books of 2023. Booklist called the novel "a modern Hemingway."

Magariel founded Convent Arts Fellowship and the Director of Arts at the Cape May Point Science Center in New Jersey.

== See also ==
- List of American novelists
