= Heyday (novel) =

2007 historical novel by Kurt Andersen

- First edition of Hey Day
- Author: Kurt Andersen
- Language: English
- Genre: Historical fiction
- Publisher: Random House
- Publication date: 2007
- Pages: 622
- Award: David J. Langum Sr. Prize for American Historical Fiction
- ISBN: 9780375504730

Heyday is a 2007 historical novel by Kurt Andersen, published by Random House. In 2008, it won the Langum Prize, awarded annually to the best work of American historical fiction.

== Summary ==
The protagonist, Ben Knowles, is from a London manufacturing family. In 1848 he experiences the disorders in Paris and then resolves to move to the United States, the 'New World,' "craving vulgarity and strangeness" (page 6). In New York he encounters Timothy Skaggs, a journalist, novelist and pioneering photographer, Duff Lucking, a fire-fighter and Mexican–American War veteran, and Duff's sister Polly, an actress and prostitute. The novel charts the characters as they journey west and participate in the California Gold Rush.
