= Langum Prizes =

The David J. Langum Sr. Prizes are American literary awards for biography, legal history, community activism, and formerly, historical fiction, awarded annually since 2001 by the Langum Charitable Trust.

The Langum Prize for American Historical Fiction (or David J. Langum, Sr. Prize in American Historical Fiction) was awarded for historical fiction between 2003 and 2022. The prize was for $1,000 and was awarded annually at Wheeler Theater, Port Townsend, Washington, in conjunction with Centrum Foundation’s annual Writers Conference. The prize was discontinued in 2024.

The David J. Langum, Sr. Prize in American Legal History or Biography (or Langum Prize for Legal History or Biography) is awarded for legal history or biography and given since 2001. The prize is $1,000 and is awarded annually at the Birmingham Public Library, Birmingham, Alabama. The ceremony is sponsored by the Friends of the Birmingham Public Library and the Birmingham Public Library.

== Honorees ==
Past winners and honorees of the David J. Langum Sr. Prizes.

- 2001 (Historical Fiction Prize): No Award
- 2001 (Legal History): Elizabeth Urban Alexander, Notorious Woman: The Celebrated Case of Myra Clark Gaines (Louisiana State University Press)

- 2002 (Historical Fiction Prize): No Award
- 2002 (Legal History): Stuart Banner, The Death Penalty: An American History (Harvard University Press)
- 2002 (Legal History): Lawrence M. Friedman, American Law in the 20th Century (Yale University Press)

- 2003 (Historical Fiction Prize): Robert J. Begiebing, Rebecca Wentworth’s Distraction: A Novel (University Press of New England)
- 2003 (Legal History): Robert J. Cottrol, Raymond T. Diamond, and Leland B. Ware, Brown v. Board of Education: Caste, Culture, and the Constitution (University Press of Kansas)

- 2004 (Historical Fiction Prize): Linda Busby Parker, Seven Laurels: A Novel (Southeast Missouri State University Press)
  - (Historical Fiction Honorable Mention): Sanora Babb, Whose Names Are Unknown: A Novel (University of Oklahoma Press)
- 2004 (Legal History): John M. Ferren, Salt of the Earth, Conscience of the Court: The Story of Justice Wiley Rutledge (University of North Carolina Press)

- 2005 (Historical Fiction Prize): Peter Donahue, Madison House: A Novel (Hawthorne Books)
- 2005 (Legal History): Richard J. Ellis, To the Flag: The Unlikely History of the Pledge of Allegiance (University Press of Kansas)
  - (Legal History Honorable Mention): John W. Johnson, Griswold v. Connecticut: Birth Control and the Constitutional Right of Privacy (Kansas University Press

- 2006 (Historical Fiction Prize): Sheldon Russell, Dreams to Dust: A Tale of the Oklahoma Land Rush (University of Oklahoma Press)
- 2006 (Legal History): Saul Cornell, A Well-Regulated Militia: The Founding Fathers and the Origins of Gun Control in America (Oxford University Press)
  - (Legal History Honorable Mention): Carolyn N. Long, Mapp v. Ohio: Guarding against Unreasonable Searches and Seizures (University Press of Kansas)

- 2007 (Historical Fiction Prize): Kurt Andersen, Heyday (Random House)
- 2007 (Legal History): Bruce J. Dierenfield, The Battle over School Prayer: How Engel v. Vitale Changed America (University Press of Kansas)

- 2008 (Historical Fiction Prize): Kathleen Kent, The Heretic’s Daughter (Little, Brown)
  - (Historical Fiction Honorable Mention): Elisabeth Payne Rosen, Hallam’s War (Unbridled Books)
  - (Historical Fiction Director’s Mention): Jack Fuller, Abbeville (Unbridled Books)
- 2008 (Legal History): Ernest Freeberg, Democracy’s Prisoner: Eugene V. Debs, the Great War, and the Right to Dissent (Harvard University Press)
  - (Legal History Honorable Mention): Peter Charles Hoffer, The Treason Trials of Aaron Burr (University Press of Kansas)

- 2009 (Historical Fiction Prize): Edward Rutherfurd, New York: The Novel (Doubleday).
  - (Historical Fiction Director’s Mention): Elizabeth Cobbs Hoffman, In the Lion's Den: A Novel of the Civil War (iUniverse)
  - (Historical Fiction Director’s Mention): Jamie Ford, Hotel on the Corner of Bitter and Sweet (Random House)
- 2009 (Legal History): No Award

- 2010 (Historical Fiction Prize): Ann Weisgarber, The Personal History of Rachel DuPree (Viking)
  - (Historical Fiction Honorable Mention): Robin Oliveira, My Name is Mary Sutter (Viking)
  - (Historical Fiction Director’s Mention): Kelli Carmean, Creekside: An Archeological Novel (University of Alabama Press)
  - (Historical Fiction Director’s Mention): Jackson Taylor, The Blue Orchard (Simon & Schuster)
- 2010 (Legal History): Stephen C. Neff, Justice in Blue and Gray: A Legal History of the Civil War

- 2011 (Historical Fiction Prize): Julie Otsuka, The Buddha in the Attic
  - (Historical Fiction Honorable Mention): Geraldine Brooks, Caleb's Crossing
  - (Historical Fiction Director’s Mention): John M. Archer, After the Rain: A Novel of War and Coming Home
  - (Historical Fiction Director’s Mention): James Hoggard, The Mayor’s Daughter
  - (Historical Fiction Director’s Mention): Hugh Nissenson, The Pilgrim: A Novel
  - (Historical Fiction Director’s Mention): Sheila Ortiz-Taylor, Homestead
  - (Historical Fiction Director’s Mention): Shirley Reva Vernick, The Blood Lie
- 2011 (Legal History): Stuart Banner, American Property: A History of How, Why, and What We Own
- 2011 (Legal History): Joanna L. Grossman and Lawrence M. Friedman, Inside the Castle: Law and the Family in 20th Century America

- 2012 (Historical Fiction Prize): Ron Rash, The Cove
  - (Historical Fiction Honorable Mention): Steve Wiegenstein, Slant of Light: A Novel of Utopian Dreams and Civil War
- 2012 (Legal History/Biography): Samuel Walker, Presidents and Civil Liberties from Wilson to Obama: A Story of Poor Custodians
  - (Legal History/Biography Honorable Mention): R. Kent Newmyer, The Treason Trial of Aaron Burr: Law, Politics, and the Character Wars of the New Nation

- 2013 (Historical Fiction Prize): Gary Schanbacher, Crossing Purgatory
  - (Historical Fiction Honorable Mention): Christine Wade, Seven Locks
- 2013 (Legal History/Biography): Whitney Strub, Obscenity Rules: Roth v. United States and the Long Struggle over Sexual Expression
  - (Legal History/Biography Honorable Mention): Alexander Wohl, Father, Son, and Constitution: How Justice Tom Clark and Attorney General Ramsey Clark Shaped American Democracy

- 2014 (Historical Fiction Prize): Kimberly Elkins, What is Visible
  - (Historical Fiction Honorable Mention): Catherine Bell, Rush of Shadows
  - (Historical Fiction Director's Mention): Laila Lalami, The Moor's Account
- 2014 (Legal History/Biography): Nathaniel Grow, Baseball on Trial: The Origin of Baseball's Antitrust Exemption
  - (Legal History/Biography Honorable Mention): Lori Sturdevant, Her Honor: Rosalie Wahl and the Minnesota Women's Movement

- 2015 (Historical Fiction Prize): Faith Sullivan, Good Night, Mr. Wodehouse
  - (Historical Fiction Honorable Mention): Meg Waite Clayton, The Race for Paris
- 2015 (Legal History/Biography): Leonard L. Richards, Who Freed the Slaves? The Fight over the Thirteenth Amendment
  - (Legal History/Biography Honorable Mention): Nancy Woloch, A Class by Herself: Protective Laws for Women Workers, 1890s-1990s

- 2016 (Historical Fiction Prize): Michele Moore, The Cigar Factory
  - (Historical Fiction Finalist): Chad Dundas, Champion of the World
- 2016 (Legal History/Biography): Risa Goluboff, Vagrant Nation: Police Power, Constitutional Change, and the Making of the 1960s
  - (Legal History/Biography Finalist): Edward B. Foley, Ballot Battles: The History of Disputed Elections in the United States
  - (Legal History/Biography Finalist): Charles F. Hobson, The Great Yazoo Lands Sale: The Case of Fletcher v. Peck

- 2017 (Historical Fiction Prize): Laurel Davis Huber, The Velveteen Daughter
  - (Historical Fiction Finalist): Wiley Cash, The Last Ballad
  - (Historical Fiction Finalist): Janet Benton, Lilli de Jong
- 2017 (Legal History/Biography): Laura Kalman, The Long Reach of the Sixties: LBJ, Nixon, and the Making of the Contemporary Supreme Court

- 2018 (Historical Fiction Prize): Louisa Hall, Trinity
  - (Historical Fiction Finalist): Nick Dybek, The Verdun Affair
- 2018 (Legal History/Biography): Kimberly M. Welch, Black Litigants in the Antebellum South
  - (Legal History/Biography Finalist): John A. Fliter, Child Labor in America: The Epic Legal Struggle to Protect Children
  - (Legal History/Biography Finalist): Christopher W. Schmidt, The Sit-Ins: Protest and Legal Change in the Civil Rights Era

- 2019 (Historical Fiction Prize): Mark Barr, Watershed
  - (Historical Fiction Finalist): Ann Weisgarber, The Glovemaker
  - (Historical Fiction Finalist): Stephanie Marie Thornton, American Princess: A Novel of the First Daughter Alice Roosevelt
- 2019 (Legal History/Biography): Sarah A. Seo, Policing the Open Road: How Cars Transformed American Freedom
  - (Legal History/Biography Finalist): Jessica K. Lowe, Murder in the Shenandoah: Making Law Sovereign in Revolutionary Virginia

- 2020 (Historical Fiction Prize): Jess Walter, The Cold Millions
  - (Historical Fiction Finalist): Ron Nyren, The Book of Lost Light
- 2020 (Legal History/Biography): Sara Mayeux, Free Justice: A History of the Public Defender in Twentieth-Century America
  - (Legal History/Biography Finalist): Richard B. Bernstein, The Education of John Adams

- 2021 (Historical Fiction Prize): Michael Punke, Ridgeline
  - (Historical Fiction Finalist): Angela Jackson-Brown, When the Stars Rain Down
- 2021 (Legal History/Biography): Mia Bay, Traveling Black: A Story of Race and Resistance
  - (Legal History/Biography Finalist): Anna Lvovsky, Vice Patrol: Cops, Courts, and the Struggle over Urban Gay Life before Stonewall

- 2022 (Historical Fiction Prize): Anthony Marra, Mercury Pictures Presents
  - (Historical Fiction Finalist): Russell Banks, The Magic Kingdom
- 2022 (Legal History/Biography): John Wood Sweet, The Sewing Girl's Tale: A Story of Crime and Consequences in Revolutionary America
  - (Legal History/Biography Finalist): Brad Snyder, Democratic Justice: Felix Frankfurter, the Supreme Court, and the Making of the Liberal Establishment

- 2023 (Legal History/Biography): Dylan C. Penningroth, Before the Movement: The Hidden History of Black Civil Rights

- 2024 (Legal History/Biography): Stuart Banner, The Most Powerful Court in the World: A History of the Supreme Court of the United States
  - (Legal History/Biography Finalist): Hendrik Hartog, Nobody's Boy and His Pals: The Story of Jack Robbins and the Boys' Brotherhood Republic

- 2025 (Legal History/Biography): Beth Lew-Williams, John Doe Chinaman: A Forgotten History of Chinese Life Under American Racial Law
  - (Legal History/Biography Finalist): Jill Lepore, We the People: A History of the U.S. Constitution
