= Meg Waite Clayton =

American novelist

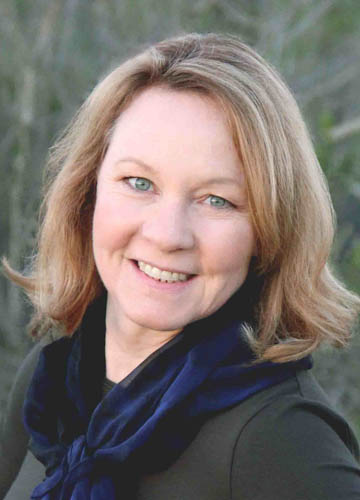
- Born: January 1, 1959 (age 67); Washington, D.C., U.S.
- Education: University of Michigan
- Occupations: Novelist, essayist
- Writing career
- Period: 1995–present
- Genre: Literary fiction
- Website: megwaiteclayton.com

Meg Waite Clayton (born January 1, 1959, in Washington, D.C.) is an American novelist.

== Biography ==
A graduate of the University of Michigan Law School, Clayton also earned bachelor's degrees in History and Psychology from the University of Michigan. She worked as a lawyer at the Los Angeles firm of Latham & Watkins. She grew up primarily in suburban Kansas City and suburban Chicago, where she graduated from Glenbrook North High School. She began writing in earnest after moving to a horse farm outside of Baltimore, Maryland, where her first novel is set. She now lives in the San Francisco Bay Area.

In addition to her work as a novelist, she has written for the Los Angeles Times, Writer's Digest, Runner's World, and public radio.

== Awards and honors ==
Clayton's first novel, The Language of Light, was a finalist for the 2002 Bellwether Prize for Fiction, now the PEN/Bellwether Prize for Socially Engaged Fiction. Her novel The Wednesday Sisters became a bestseller and a popular book club choice. Her "After the Debate" on Forbes online was praised by the Columbia Journalism Review as "[t]he absolute best story about women's issues stemming from the second Presidential debate." The Race for Paris was a 2015 Langum Prizes Historical Fiction Honorable Mention.

== Bibliography ==
- The Language of Light (2003)
- The Wednesday Sisters (2007)
- The Four Ms. Bradwells (2011)
- The Wednesday Daughters (2013)
- The Race for Paris (2015)
- Beautiful Exiles (2018)
- The Last Train to London (2019)
- The Postmistress of Paris (2021)
- Typewriter Beach (2025)
