= Chloe Radcliffe =

American comedian (born 1990)

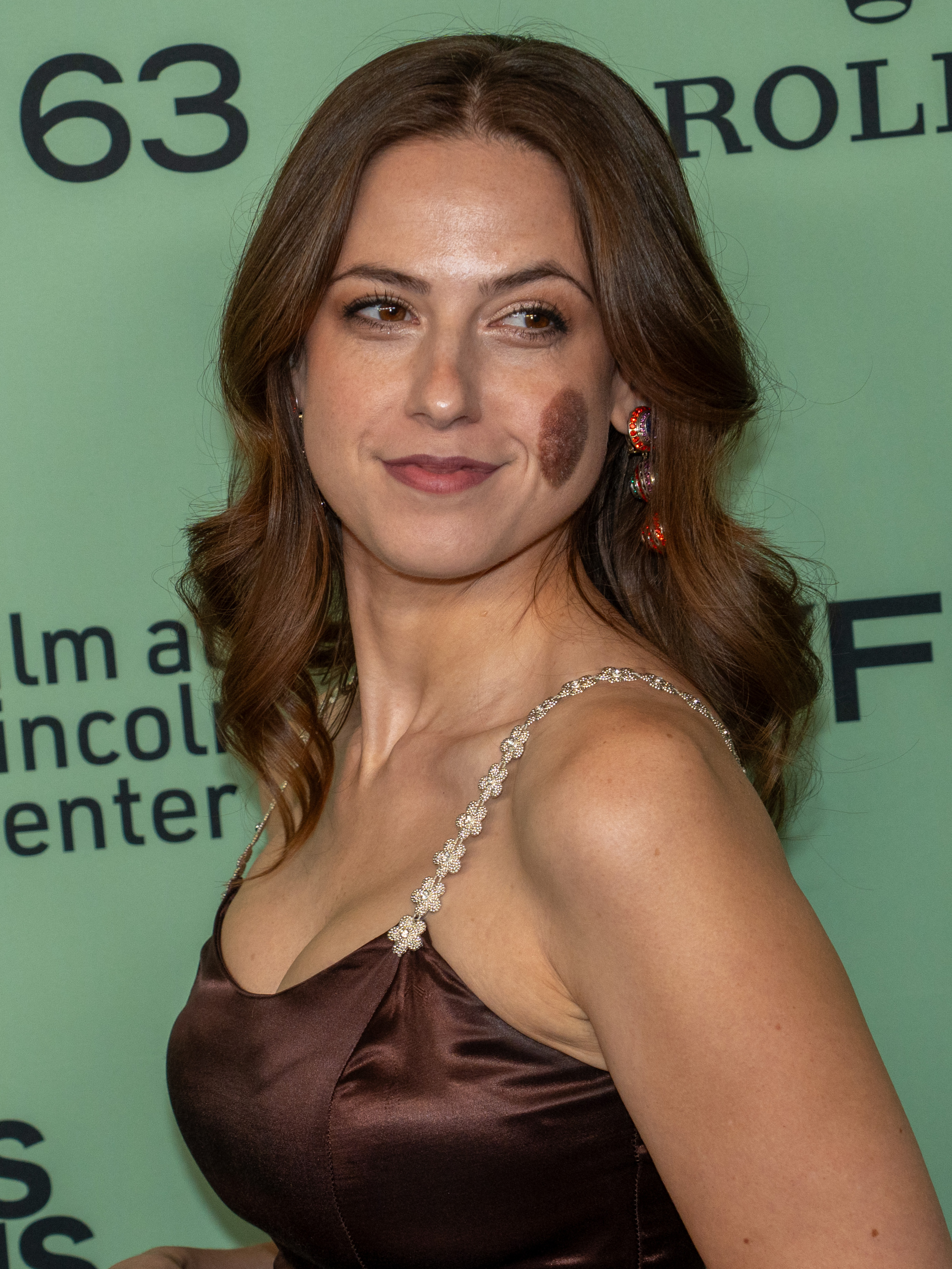
- Radcliffe at the 2025 New York Film Festival
- Born: 16 November 1990 (age 35); Prior Lake, Minnesota
- Education: Gustavus Adolphus College

Comedy career
- Medium: Stand-up; television

Chloe Radcliffe (born November 16, 1990) is an American stand-up comedian and actress.

== Early life ==
Radcliffe grew up in Prior Lake, Minnesota, and attended Gustavus Adolphus College, graduating with a degree in mathematics and a minor in theatre.

During her time at Gustavus Adolphus, she contributed to building the college's forensics team into one of the top programs in the nation. She was also a part of the LineUs Improv Comedy Troupe, the Crossroads International Program, and was a member of Phi Beta Kappa. While at Gustavus, she competed in collegiate speech and debate, winning two individual national championship titles. At the 2012 National Forensic Association (NFA) National Tournament, she helped lead Gustavus to a national team title while placing third individually in Prose Interpretation. Also in 2012, she was chosen as commencement speaker, and after graduation worked at Target headquarters in Minneapolis before starting comedy. She moved to New York City in 2018.

== Career ==
Radcliffe was named a TBS Comic To Watch at the New York Comedy Festival in 2017. and became a staff writer on The Tonight Show with Jimmy Fallon in 2020.

Radcliffe led The New York Times’ recommendations for the 2024 New York Comedy Festival. She was named one of Vulture’s Comedians You Should And Will Know in 2024 and one of Deadline’s 15 Comedians Ready To Break Out In 2025.

Radcliffe premiered her one-woman show CHEAT at the 2023 Edinburgh Fringe Festival, and received positive reviews. In 2023 Radcliffe starred in Steven Soderbergh’s Command Z, and was nominated for a 2024 WGA Award for her writing on the series. She has been seen on Comedy Central, Don’t Tell Comedy, and After Midnight with Taylor Tomlinson.

In 2025, she launched an interview series called "In Tandem with Chloe Radcliffe", where she and another comedian ride a tandem bicycle together. She made her film debut that December in Is This Thing On?, playing opposite Will Arnett as a standup comic named Nina.

In October 2026, Radcliffe premiered her debut Comedy Central stand-up special, Eyes Down Here. To promote the release, she ran a targeted billboard campaign across the Twin Cities metro area featuring messages directed at former high school and college crushes.
