= Bora Ćosić =

Serbian author (born 1932)

- Born: 5 April 1932 (age 94); Zagreb, Kingdom of Yugoslavia
- Citizenship: German, Croatian
- Education: University of Belgrade
- Writing career
- Language: Serbo-Croatian
- Genres: Prose, essay
- Notable work: Price o zanatima Uloga moje porodice u svetskoj revoluciji
- Notable awards: NIN Award

Bora Ćosić (born 5 April 1932) is a former Yugoslav, Serbian and Croatian novelist, essayist, translator, public intellectual, and dissident. He wrote about 50 books, as well as several theater plays, which were played with great success in the Belgrade Atelje 212. For the novel The Role of My Family in the World Revolution, he received the NIN Award for Novel of the Year in 1970. Ćosić strongly denounced the rise of Serbian nationalism in the 1990s and the politics of Slobodan Milošević. Born in 1932 in Zagreb, he lived in Belgrade from 1937 to 1992, when he moved to Berlin.

== Biography ==
Bora Ćosić, was born in 1932 in Zagreb, Croatia and moved to Belgrade with his family in 1937. There he finished high school at the First Men's Gymnasium, then studied at the Department of Philosophy at the University of Belgrade. In his youth, he translated Russian futuristic poets, edited the newspaper Mlada kultura in 1952, the magazine Danas in 1961–1963, and the magazine Rok in 1969–1970. He worked as a playwright and artistic advisor in the film companies "Slavija", 1958–1959, and "Avala", 1962–1963. He collaborated on documentaries, wrote dialogue for feature films. During his stay in Europe, in addition to complete books, he published hundreds of texts in newspapers and magazines in Germany, Austria, Switzerland, Italy, the Netherlands, Hungary, Romania, Russia, Poland and Albania. He has participated in more than two hundred readings in several European countries. He has given more than a hundred interviews for various media, press, radio and television. He has participated in literary conferences, festivals, symposia, international meetings and congresses. In 2017, he signed the Declaration on the Common Language of the Croats, Serbs, Bosniaks and Montenegrins.

== Literary opus ==
He began his career as a writer with the novel House of Thieves from 1956, and then published books of essays Visible and Invisible Man, 1962, Sodom and Gomorrah, 1963. He is the author of the cult novel of recent Serbian prose, The Role of My Family in the World Revolution, 1969, set in war and post-war Belgrade. At the same time, Ćosić is the legatee to the Central European prose tradition of intellectual essayism, as well as one of the last intellectuals who emotionally and sincerely identified with the Yugoslavia, with a mixture of elegiac and painful re-examination after its disintegration. A film of the same name was made based on that novel.

The disintegration of Yugoslavia took the writer into voluntary exile (most often in Rovinj and Berlin, while publishing in Croatia). That part of his work is marked mainly by essays, among which the Diary of Stateless Persons, 1993, (again a play with fictitious identity through which he expresses views on contemporary socio-political reality), Good Governance, 1995, and Customs Declaration, 2000, a semi – autobiographical text soaked in reflections on Yugoslavia and the author 's mixed feelings about it. He has written about 50 books, published in Serbia, Croatia and Germany.

== Awards ==
- 1969: NIN Award, for novel Uloga moje porodice u svetskoj revoluciji.
- 2001: International Stefan Heym Prize.
- 2002: Leipzig Book Prize for European Understanding, for an autobiographical essay Carinska deklaracija.
- 2008: Albatros Literaturpreis, for Priče o zanatima.

== Works ==
Incomplete list of works:

- Kuća lopova, 1956.
- Vidljivi i nevidljivi čovek, 1962.
- Sodoma i Gomora, 1963.
- Priče o zanatima, 1966.
- Uloga moje porodice u svetskoj revoluciji, 1969.
- Tutori, 1978.
- Poslovi/sumnje/snovi Miroslava Krleže, 1983.
- Doktor Krleža, 1988.
- Dnevnik apatrida, 1993.
- Dobra vladavina (i psihopatalogija njenog svakodnevlja), 1995.
- Carinska deklaracija, 2000.
- Pogled maloumnog, 2001.
- Tkanje, 2001.
- Nulta zemlja, 2002.
- Irenina soba, (poezija), 2002.
- Izgnanici, 2005.
- Consul u Beogradu, 2007.
- Put na Aljasku, 2008.
- Zapadno od raja, 2009.
- Kratko detinjstvo u Agramu, 2011.
- Doručak kod Majestica, 2011.
- Povest o Miškinu, 2019.
- Bez, 2021.
- Bergotova udovica, 2022.
