= Fantasy Land (Mumbai) =

Former amusement park in India

Fantasy Land was an amusement park built over 30 acres at Jogeshwari in Mumbai, opened in 1992. Due to Fantasy Land's location and lower prices, it was a more accessible alternative to the more popular EsselWorld. In 1997, Fantasy Land attracted over 800,000 visitors a year.

In 1994, the road to Fantasy Land was expanded and converted to what is now Jogeshwari–Vikhroli Link Road.

Fantasy Land has since been closed and replaced by the Oberoi Splendor Grande housing complex.
