= Julie Otsuka =

American author (born 1962)

- Born: May 15, 1962 (age 64); Palo Alto, California, U.S.
- Education: Yale University; Columbia University
- Relatives: Michael Otsuka
- Writing career
- Language: English
- Genre: Historical fiction
- Notable works: When the Emperor Was Divine; The Buddha in the Attic; The Swimmers
- Website: www.julieotsuka.com

Julie Otsuka (born May 15, 1962) is a Japanese-American author. She is known for drawing from her personal life to write autoethnographical historical novels about the life of Japanese Americans. In 2002 she published her first novel, When the Emperor was Divine, which is about the Japanese-American internment camps that took place in 1942-45 during World War II. The story begins in California, where she was born and raised, and it is based on Otsuka's grandfather who was arrested as a suspected spy for Japan the day after Pearl Harbor. Her novel, in 2003, received an award from the Asian American Literary Award and American Library Association Alex Award. Otsuka continued to write about her family's history and in 2011 published her second novel, The Buddha in the Attic, which takes place in the early 1900s and discusses the marriages of Japanese women who immigrated to the United States to marry men they knew only through photographs. These women are known as "picture brides" for this reason. During this year, she also published a short story titled "Diem Perdidi," that translates to "I have lost the day," which dives into a more personal space as it is based on her mother who had frontotemporal dementia. This short story was the beginning of her third novel published in 2022 titled, The Swimmers, which further relates her experience as the daughter of a mother with frontotemporal dementia.

== Biography ==
Otsuka was born on May 15, 1962, in Palo Alto, California. Her father worked as an aerospace engineer and her mother worked as a lab technician before she gave birth to Otsuka. Both of her parents were of Japanese descent: her father is an issei, and her mother was a nisei. When she was nine, her family moved to Palos Verdes, California. She has two younger brothers, David and Michael, a professor at the London School of Economics. Her mother died in 2015 from frontotemporal dementia.

After graduating from high school, Otsuka attended Yale University, graduating with a Bachelor of Arts degree in art in 1984. She graduated from Columbia University with a Master of Fine Arts in 1999. Her debut novel, When the Emperor Was Divine, deals with Internment of Japanese Americans during World War II. It was published in 2002 by Alfred A. Knopf. Her second novel, The Buddha in the Attic (2011), is a prequel to When the Emperor Was Divine about Japanese picture brides. The Swimmers (2022) is the third installment in the author's trilogy of books regarding Japanese Americans in the United States.

Otsuka's autoethnographical historical fiction novels deal with Japanese and Japanese American characters and their experiences during their respective historical periods. Although she did not live through World War II, her mother, uncle, and two grandparents did, giving Otsuka a personal perspective on the matter. When the Emperor Was Divine portrays the experience of an unnamed family incarcerated in the Japanese-American internment camp. Otsuka has a background as a painter, and her books have vivid imagery. She is a recipient of the Albatros Literaturpreis.

Otsuka lives in New York City. Her most recent book is The Swimmers (2022). The novel tells the story of three women, unknown to each other, for whom the routine of swimming daily laps helps hold their lives together, until a crack develops in their community pool and disrupts everything they hold dear. This book was based on her own experiences with her mother as she watched her struggle with frontotemporal dementia. Of her mother, Otsuka said, "Everything I write seems to be about her in some way—this is especially true in The Swimmers. Even when I try not to write about her, she somehow surfaces in the work, if only as a ghostly penumbra. All these years later, I’m still trying to figure out who she was."

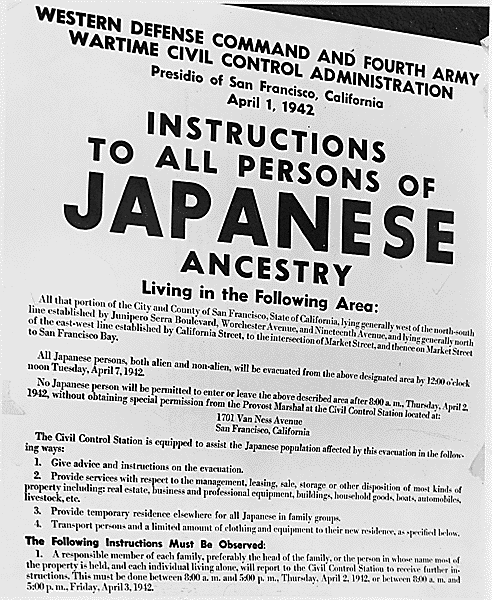
Instructions to All Persons of Japanese Ancestry Poster as a Result of Executive Order 9066

=== Personal family history and the relation to characters in When the Emperor Was Divine ===
Following Japan's Attack on Pearl Harbor on December 7, 1941, President Franklin D. Roosevelt signed Executive Order 9066 calling for the immediate removal of all Japanese and Japanese-Americans on the West Coast of the United States to Japanese-American internment (concentration) camps. Approximately 120,000 persons of Japanese ancestry were forcibly taken to one of 10 Japanese internment camps from 1942 to 1945. While Otsuka's grandfather was arrested by the FBI under suspicion of being "dangerous enemy alien" following the bombing of Pearl Harbor, Otsuka's grandmother, mother, and uncle weren't incarcerated until Executive Order 9066 was signed into law on February 19, 1942. The family was then held in a horse stall at the Tanforan Racetrack until they were subsequently transferred to the Topaz Internment Camp near Delta, Utah. They remained prisoners in the Topaz Internment Camp for the next three years until they were able to return to their pre-war home in Berkeley, CA, on September 9, 1945.

Otsuka reports that while she was growing up, her mother rarely spoke of the family's internment camp years. It was only mentioned in passing references- like when she hung up the phone at the end of a phone call, she would say, "Well, the FBI will be checking on you soon...." Even so, the unnamed family of characters in her novel, When the Emperor Was Divine, reflected Otsuka's own family experience in many direct ways: the father character was arrested immediately after the bombing of Pearl Harbor by the FBI under suspicion of being a dangerous enemy alien, the postcards from the father character were taken from actual postcards sent from her grandfather to his family during his own internment, and her uncle served as a prototype for the son character.

== Awards and honors ==
In 2002, When the Emperor Was Divine received the distinctions of New York Times Notable Book and Best Book of the Year from the San Francisco Chronicle

In 2004, Otsuka received a Guggenheim Fellowship.

In 2011, The Buddha in the Attic was a New York Times and San Francisco Chronicle bestseller.

In 2022, Publishers Weekly named The Swimmers one of the top ten works of fiction published that year.

In 2022, Otsuka received a Children's Literary Association Phoenix Award for When the Emperor Was Divine.

Awards for Otsuka's writing
Year	Title	Award	Category	Result	Ref.
2003	When the Emperor Was Divine	Asian American Literary Award	—	Won	
2003	When the Emperor Was Divine	Alex Award	—	Won	
2011	The Buddha in the Attic	Los Angeles Times Book Prize	Fiction	Finalist	
2011	The Buddha in the Attic	Langum Prize	Historical Fiction	Won	
2011	The Buddha in the Attic	National Book Award	Fiction	Finalist	
2012	The Buddha in the Attic	Arts and Letters Awards	Literature	Won	
2012	The Buddha in the Attic	PEN/Faulkner Award for Fiction	—	Won	
2012	The Buddha in the Attic	Prix Femina Étranger	—	Won	
2014	The Buddha in the Attic	Albatros Literaturpreis	—	Won	
2023	The Swimmers	Andrew Carnegie Medal for Excellence	Fiction	Won	

=== Critical acclaim ===
Author Julie Otsuka has been given extensive critical acclaim for her donation to contemporary literature, which has been pronounced by a variety of reputable awards and recognitions that underline her storytelling and exploration of thought-provoking themes. Published in 2002, Otsuka's first book, When the Emperor Was Divine, was recognized by The New York Times with a Notable Book of the Year, was offered The Best Book of the Year from The San Francisco Chronicle, and won the Asian American Literary Award as well as the Alex Award. Acclaim surrounding this artist suggests that her work encompasses the complexities of belonging, identity, and memories in order to deliver literature featuring multicultural themes. Her work leads audiences to think about large social issues and contains historical and personal narratives. Her voice has remained relevant in the literary field with criticism from multiple sources about trauma featured in her work such as Jeffrey Tyler Gibbons' Asian American War Stories: Trauma and Healing in Contemporary Asian American Literature. In this piece, Gibbons discusses the complicated trauma that fell upon Asian Americans and how it was produced by the war. His scholarly article discusses Otsuka's work in When the Emperor Was Divine and how it has demonstrated the effects of the war and “embraces a perspective on post-traumatic suffering that emphasizes the potential for healing and recovery” (Gibbons 18). Another author named Manuel Jobert's critical essay called "Odd Pronominal Narratives: The Singular Voice of the First-Person Plural in Julie Otsuka's The Buddha in the Attic", features many key ideas and how these ideas feature a “we” narrative, an experience shared by a group because we are all are being subjected to the same behavior and trauma collectively as a whole (Jobert 541). It discusses how When the Emperor Was Divine “the narrator becomes the mouthpiece of Japanese immigrants”, during and after the effects of Pearl Harbor and the Japanese internment camps (Jobert 541).

== Works ==
- —— (2002). When the Emperor Was Divine. New York: Alfred A. Knopf. ISBN 9780385721813.
- —— (2011). The Buddha in the Attic. New York: Alfred A. Knopf. ISBN 9780307744425.
- —— (2022). The Swimmers. New York: Alfred A. Knopf. ISBN 9780593321331.
