= Studio 360 =

Defunct American weekly public radio program

- Genre: Magazine/talk program using art, culture, music, film, TV, books, technology, and ideas as a lens to understand the world
- Country of origin: United States
- Language: English
- Syndicates: Public Radio International (2000-2018); Public Radio Exchange (2018-2020)
- Hosted by: Kurt Andersen
- Created by: Public Radio International, Julie Burstein, Kurt Andersen
- Produced by: David Krasnow, Leital Molad
- Recording studio: New York City, New York
- Original release: 2000 – 2020
- Website: pri.org/studio360
- Podcast: feeds.feedburner.com/studio360/podcast

Studio 360 was an American weekly public radio program about the arts and culture hosted by novelist Kurt Andersen and produced by the Public Radio Exchange (PRX) and Slate in New York City. The program's stated goal was to "Get inside the creative mind" and used arts and culture as a lens to understand the world. The program was created by PRI based on an identified need for programming dedicated and focused on arts and culture journalism in media.

== Guests ==
While the show featured regular guest interviews with authors such as Joyce Carol Oates, Jonathan Lethem, and Miranda July, and musicians as diverse as Laura Veirs, Don Byron, and k.d. lang, it also had several recurring segments. The American Icons series attempted to understand lasting American cultural icons such as The Great Gatsby and Kind of Blue. The hour on Moby-Dick was the recipient of the 2004 Peabody Award. Public Radio International and WNYC co-produced the show from 2000 to 2017, when Slate replaced WNYC. After PRI merged with PRX, PRX continued to syndicate the show until the program's cancellation. The program was funded in part by the National Endowment for the Humanities.

== Broadcast ==
Studio 360 was broadcast weekly on more than 160 terrestrial radio stations throughout the country, and was also available as a podcast via the program's website. It could also be heard on XM Satellite Radio on the PRI blocks on XMPR, channel 133.

In addition to the program's main podcast, a spinoff arts and culture podcast titled Sideshow was also distributed. Sideshow is hosted by Studio 360 producer Sean Rameswaram.

In 2020, the Public Radio Exchange (PRX) canceled Studio 360. Its final episode aired on February 27, 2020, and it featured Alec Baldwin interviewing Kurt Andersen, as well as a performance by Rosanne Cash. It was also the last program to feature the PRI jingle as the PRI name was retired in 2019 in favor of PRX due to the merge with PRI.

== Awards ==
The program won numerous awards including the George M. Foster Peabody Award, the Gabriel Award, and honorable mention at the Third Coast International Audio Festival in 2007.
