= Dr. Thomas' Eclectric Oil =

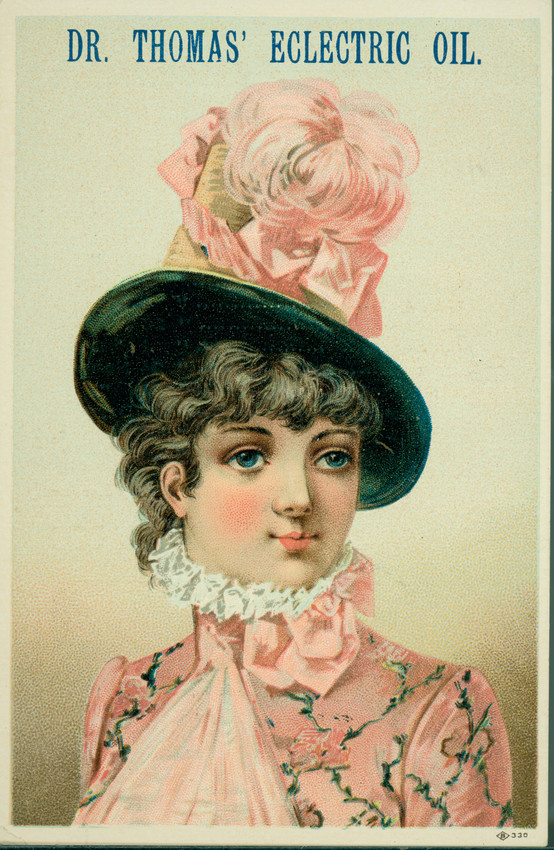
Dr. Thomas' Eclectric Oil trading card

Dr. Thomas’ Eclectric Oil was a widely used pain relief remedy which was sold in Canada and the United States as a patent medicine from the 1850s into the early twentieth century. Like many patent medicines, it was advertised as a unique cure-all, but mostly contained common ingredients such as turpentine and camphor oil.

== Development ==
Dr. Thomas' Eclectric Oil was created by Dr. Samuel N. Thomas of Phelps, New York. Although it was not uncommon to name patent remedies after fabricated characters, especially doctors, contemporary directories do list a so-called "electric physician" named Samuel N. Thomas living in Phelps from approximately 1867 to 1870. The word "Eclectric" is likely a portmanteau of the words "eclectic" and "electric", alluding to the then-popular belief that electricity had curative powers. Referencing scientific-sounding concepts in product branding in this manner was a common tactic in patent medicine marketing.

Dr. Thomas' Eclectric Oil became a staple in many households within the United States as well as Canada. In the United States, the medicine was sold through the Foster-Milburn company based out of Buffalo, New York. In Canada, the primary distributor was Northrop & Lyman based in Toronto. A partnership was organized between these two companies in 1876, and often acquired products through small proprietors, including Dr. Thomas’ Eclectric Oil.

The name of the product was changed several times due to changes in ownership. When Foster- Milburn purchased the medicine in 1880 or 1884, the name was changed to Excelsior Eclectric Oil. In 1906, the name had to be changed to Dr. Thomas’ Eclectic Oil due to the Pure Food and Drug Act which required that sellers must not have misleading information on product labels. In this case, the name was changed because electricity was not a component of the remedy.

== Ownership ==
The first person to own and begin production of Eclectric Oil was Doctor S. N. Thomas in the 1840s. His formula was extremely popular amongst buyers when he sold it to the Excelsior Botanical Company in the 1870s. They renamed the product Excelsior Eclectric Oil while they were marketing it. Northrop & Lyman brought the marketing of the product to Canada in 1871, where they were able to make it and sell it under their own name in Canada. Between 1880 and 1884, Foster, Milburn & Co. bought the product from Excelsior Eclectric Oil and renamed it back to Dr. S. N. Thomas’ Eclectic Oil when they began marketing it. It was around this time that the product started being distributed nationally and internationally. A trade card began being distributed by James H. S. Aumann between 1940 and 1975. This card had a woman wearing Victorian clothes on the front.

== Advertising ==
Many different forms of advertisements were created for this "cure-all" medicine. The majority of these ads could be found in Northrop & Lyman almanacs and Victorian trading cards, as well as some newspapers such as the Holland City News. Many of the Victorian trading cards, which were likely used up until 1901, portray young women in elegant dresses as well as frogs and cats. The slogan for the medicine appears to be the phrase "worth its weight in gold", which is portrayed on several of the advertisements. The popularity of Dr. Thomas's Eclectric Oil is also believed to have been spread by commercial travellers working for the company who would encourage druggists and consumers to purchase the product.

== Ingredients and uses ==
Eclectric oil was advertised as an over the counter "cure all" medicine, containing common ingredients that are still used in many alternative medical remedies performed at home. This oil was a "DIY" for many common ailments. While the name suggests the uses of electricity and magnetic forces, leading consumers to believe it to be the new modern medicine, the ingredients in this oil were and still are fairly common. The composition of the oil contained main ingredients such as spirits of turpentine, camphor oil (commonly found in many brands of vapor rub), as well as Eucalyptus, Thyme, and a variety of fish oils. Some sources suggest other ingredients as well but the general formula is written on the back of the Eclectric bottle. A recipe said to be similar to Thomas' was published in "Fenner's Complete Formulary" (1889), with ingredients listed as Camphor, ½ oz.; Oil Gaultheria, ½ oz.; Oil Origanum, ½ oz.; Chloroform, 1 oz.; Laudanum, 1 oz.; Oil Sassafras, 1 oz.; Oil Hemlock, 1 oz.; Oil Turpentine, 1 oz.; Balsam fir, 1 oz.; Tincture Guaiacum, 1 oz.; Tincture Catechu, 1 oz.; Alcohol, 4 pt.; Alkanet, sufficient to color." Because the ingredients are claimed to be natural, Eclectric oil can be used internally and topically as needed.

It claims to cure toothaches, wounds, and any kind of pain within minutes of being applied. The bottle suggests consuming 15 drops to half a teaspoon mixed with sugar for ailments such as coughs and sore throat for deeper pain due to wounds or muscle aches, or saturating the area with the oil and massaging the oil in as needed for external pain.

== Bottle ==
The bottle Foster, Milburn and Co. created for the product was in a rectangular shape with the front indented to list the product name, and the back left plain. The bottle also had flat, sloped corners. One of the shorter sides listed Foster-Milburn's name, while the other listed internal and external uses. Their most recent bottle made before the discontinuation of the product had a similar shape with a paper label. Northrop & Lyman had a bottle shape similar to the early Foster-Milburn bottles with the name and address of the company listed on the label. All four sides of the bottle were eventually embossed.
