= Kurt Andersen =

American writer and radio host

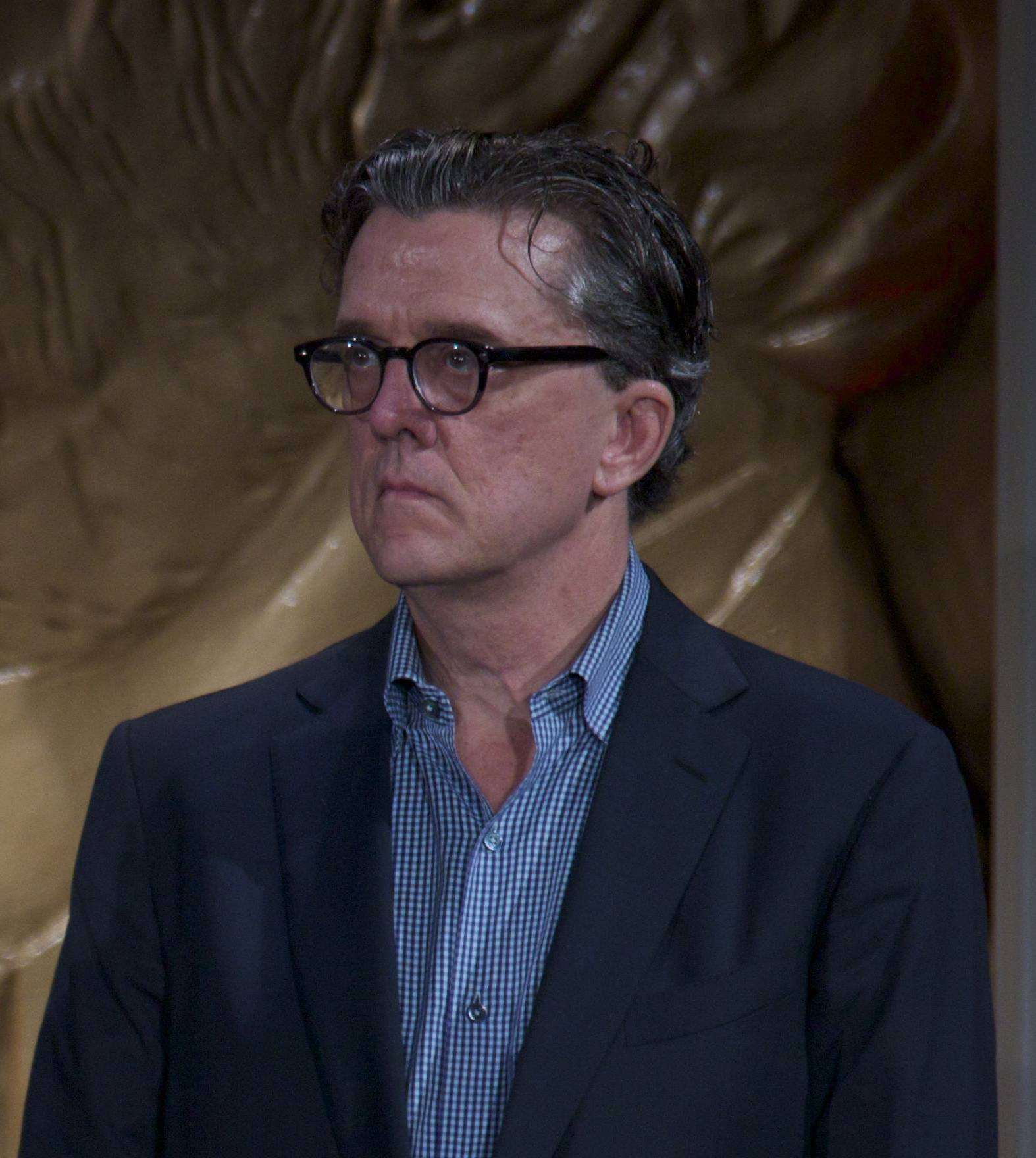
- Andersen at the 72nd Annual Peabody Awards (2013)
- Born: Omaha, Nebraska, U.S.
- Education: Harvard College
- Occupations: Novelist; Historian; TV writer/playwright; Podcast/radio host; Editor
- Spouse: Anne Kreamer
- Children: 2
- Website: www.kurtandersen.com

Kurt B. Andersen is an American writer, the author of novels and nonfiction, as well as a writer for television and the theater. His work frequently focuses on American sociopolitical history and satire, ranging from cultural analysis to near-future speculative fiction.

He was a co-founder of Spy magazine, as well as co-creator and host of the weekly Peabody Award-winning public radio program and podcast Studio 360.

== Early life and education ==
Andersen was born in Omaha, Nebraska. Growing up, he lived across the street from Ginni Thomas. He graduated from Westside High School. While a student at Harvard College, he was an editor and vice-president of the Harvard Lampoon. He graduated magna cum laude from Harvard, and has been awarded honorary doctorates by the Rhode Island School of Design and Pratt Institute.

== Journalism, broadcasting, and media ==
Early in his career, Andersen worked as a writer for the Today Show critic and interviewer Gene Shalit. Before and during his tenure at Spy, he wrote for Time, including nine years as its architecture and design critic.

In 1986, Andersen, with E. Graydon Carter and Thomas L. Phillips Jr., co-founded Spy. In his introduction to the 2006 retrospective anthology Spy: The Funny Years, author Dave Eggers assessed the publication's benchmark cultural impact:

Spy was the most influential magazine of the 1980s. It might have remade New York's cultural landscape; it definitely changed the whole tone of magazine journalism. It was cruel, brilliant, beautifully written and perfectly designed, and feared by all. There's no magazine I know of that's so continually referenced, held up as a benchmark; and whose demise is so lamented.

— Dave Eggers, 2006

In 2006, novelist Christopher Buckley wrote that "Spy didn't capture the zeitgeist—it was the zeitgeist," that it was "deliciously vicious", and "despised by all the right people, primus inter pares, Donald Trump." In Spy, Andersen and Carter in 1988 coined the notable epithet "short-fingered vulgarian Donald Trump" for the future U.S. president.

Media critic Jack Shafer wrote in 2009 that Spy was one of "a handful of 20th-century American magazines...whose glory days continue to influence editors." In a 2017 paper about Spy, Marist College journalism professor and department chair Kevin M. Lerner wrote that "a whole generation of journalists was raised with the Spy attitude ingrained not just into their writing but into their world view," and that "more than anything, Spy invented the painstakingly reported – but still funny – satirical magazine feature. It was as funny as Mad, and as well-reported as The New Yorker."

Andersen co-wrote and co-produced two hour-long prime-time Spy specials for NBC. The first, Spy Magazine Presents How to Be Famous (1991), was hosted by Jerry Seinfeld; the second, The Spy Magazine Hit List: The 100 Most Annoying and Alarming People and Events of 1992, was hosted by Julia Louis-Dreyfus. Andersen and his partners sold Spy in 1991, and he departed the magazine in 1993; it continued publishing until its formal closure in 1998.

From 1996 to 1999, Andersen was a staff writer and columnist ("The Culture Industry") for The New Yorker, and from 2004 to 2008 he served as a columnist for New York ("The Imperial City"). He has also been a regular contributor to Vanity Fair, bridging his magazine journalism with his later book themes by dissecting the cultural roots of populist movements such as the Tea Party and Occupy Wall Street.

He became editor-in-chief of New York in 1994, after which its circulation and advertising revenue quickly rose. In early 1996, a New York Times article quoted Andersen, stating that Henry Kravis, the head of Kohlberg Kravis Roberts (KKR), the financial firm that controlled New York's publishing company, asked him to kill a story about a rivalry between Felix Rohatyn and Steven Rattner for control of the Lazard investment bank, and to stop covering Wall Street altogether. Andersen demurred, and was fired five months later.

In 1999, Andersen co-founded Inside, an online media news website and biweekly magazine recognized as a pioneering early attempt at digital-first, insider media reporting prior to the dot-com crash. In 2001, he and his co-founders merged Inside with a site and magazine founded by Steven Brill. The merged enterprise was subsequently acquired by Primedia (now Rent Group), but Primedia closed the Brill site in October 2001, and later Inside as well.

From 2001 to 2004, Andersen served as a senior creative consultant to Barry Diller's Universal Television, where he co-created the arts and entertainment channel Trio with Michael Jackson, Lauren Zalaznick, and Andy Cohen. From 2003 to 2005 he was editorial director of Colors magazine, a role that bridged his editorial background with his visual and design interests through the publication's ad-free, photojournalistic exploration of global sociopolitical issues. In 2006, with his former colleague Jackson and Bonnie Siegler (and Diller's IAC), he co-founded the daily email cultural curation service Very Short List. From 2007 to 2008 he was an editor-at-large for Random House, and in 2011 he served as a guest op-ed columnist for The New York Times.

He co-created Studio 360, a weekly program covering arts and culture, which he hosted from its launch in 1999 to its final broadcast episode in 2020. Originally a co-production of Public Radio International and WNYC, it was broadcast on 240 U.S. public radio stations to a weekly audience of more than 500,000 listeners, with an extensive podcast audience during the 2010s. In 2005, the show won a Peabody Award for an hour-long documentary about Moby-Dick, the first of its 17 "American Icons" hours, each exploring a transformative cultural work or entity—including The Autobiography of Malcolm X, 2001: A Space Odyssey, Monticello, Disneyland, and EPCOT. Studio 360 remains accessible online as a podcast archive.

In 2021, he co-produced, wrote, and narrated Nixon At War, a seven-episode podcast detailing how Richard Nixon's responses to the Vietnam War resulted in his political downfall and fueled the contemporary polarization of American society. The project, funded by the National Endowment for the Humanities and distributed by PRX/Public Radio Exchange, was drawn from hundreds of archival recordings unearthed from the Nixon and Lyndon Johnson presidencies.

In addition to the foregoing, Andersen regularly contributes to The New York Times, and since 2017 has been a frequent contributor to The Atlantic.

== Literary works ==
Andersen is the author of five novels. His first was Turn of the Century (Random House, 1999), which was a national bestseller and New York Times Notable Book of the Year. Heyday (Random House, 2007) was also a New York Times bestseller, and won the Langum Prize for the best American historical novel of 2007. True Believers (Random House, 2012) was named one of the best novels of that year by the San Francisco Chronicle and the Washington Post. His fourth novel, You Can't Spell America Without Me: The Really Tremendous Inside Story of My Fantastic First Year As President (Penguin, 2017), is a fictional parody memoir "by" Donald Trump co-authored with Alec Baldwin, which also became a New York Times bestseller. Andersen's short fiction has appeared in anthologies such as Neil Gaiman's Stories: All-New Tales (HarperCollins, 2010).

Andersen's first book was a collection of humorous essays, The Real Thing (Doubleday, 1980; Holt, 1982; Bison Books, 2008), centered around the concept of "quintessentialism". He co-authored two humor books: Tools of Power (Viking, 1980), a parody of self-help books on becoming successful, and Loose Lips (Simon & Schuster, 1995), an anthology of edited transcripts of real-life conversations involving celebrated figures, based on an off-Broadway play of the same name he created with Lisa Birnbach and Jamie Malanowski. Along with Carter and George Kalogerakis, Andersen wrote and assembled a history and greatest-hits anthology of Spy called Spy: The Funny Years, published in 2006 by Miramax Books.

He also wrote Reset (Random House, 2009), an essay analyzing the causes and aftermath of the Great Recession. He has contributed to many other works, including Spark: How Creativity Works (HarperCollins, 2011), drawn entirely from his interviews for Studio 360; an introduction to Heinrich Böll's novel The Lost Honour of Katharina Blum (Penguin, 2010); and Fields of Vision: The Photographs of John Vachon (Library of Congress, 2010).

In 2017, he published Fantasyland: How America Went Haywire: A 500-Year History (Random House), which examines American society's historical susceptibility to falsehoods and illusions, tracing how this trait influenced Trump's election and the transformation of the Republican Party. Excerpts from Fantasyland appeared as a cover story in The Atlantic, and in Slate. Fantasyland, which the New York Times Book Review called "a great revisionist history of America," reached #3 on the New York Times nonfiction bestseller list.

In August 2020, he published Evil Geniuses: The Unmaking of America, which Andersen described as a companion volume to Fantasyland. Evil Geniuses examines coordinated efforts to enact conservative economic and political shifts in the United States from the 1970s through 2020, discussing how the resulting unfettered laissez-faire approach to capitalism produced extreme economic inequality. It reached #7 on the Times nonfiction bestseller list.

Written and directed as a narrative extension of the themes explored in Evil Geniuses, Andersen co-created the 2023 satirical sci-fi web series Command Z with director Steven Soderbergh. The series, starring Michael Cera, Liev Schreiber, and Roy Wood Jr., centers on operatives from a dystopian 2050 who travel back in time via corporate wormholes to instill empathy in historical figures. By reframing his sociopolitical diagnoses as speculative fiction, Andersen and Soderbergh used the project to satirize corporate culture and explore the mechanics of averting societal collapse. Released in July 2023 on Soderbergh's website with all proceeds directed to charity, the eight-episode series is now freely viewable.

In August 2026, Random House published Andersen's fifth novel, The Breakup, which extends his sociopolitical commentary into near-future dystopian satire. Set in 2045 during the aftermath of a second American civil war that has fractured the nation into redrawn borders like the "Free American Republic," the story follows a couple navigating an AI-saturated society while living on opposite sides of the national divide. By mirroring America's ideological unraveling through the dissolution of a twenty-three-year marriage during a cross-country college tour with their teenage daughter, the novel explores whether a fractured nation’s relationship is recoverable.

== Personal life ==
Andersen lives in New York City and Cornwall, Connecticut with his wife, author Anne Kreamer. They have two daughters, Katherine Kreamer Andersen and Lucy Kreamer Andersen. At age 32, he was diagnosed with type 1 diabetes.

== Works ==
=== Fiction ===
- Turn of the Century (Random House, 1999)
- Heyday (Random House, 2007)
- True Believers (Random House, 2012)
- You Can't Spell America Without Me: The Really Tremendous Inside Story of My Fantastic First Year As President (with Alec Baldwin) (Penguin, 2017)
- The Breakup (Random House, (released August 18, 2026) ISBN 978-1-9848-0137-1

=== Nonfiction and humor ===
- The Real Thing (Doubleday, 1980; Holt, 1982; Bison Books, 2008)
- Tools of Power: The Elitist's Guide to the Ruthless Exploitation of Everybody and Everything (with Mark O'Donnell and Roger Parloff) (Viking, 1980)
- Loose Lips: Real Words, Real People, Real Funny (with Jamie Malanowski and Lisa Birnbach) (Simon & Schuster, 1995)
- Spy: The Funny Years (with George Kalogerakis and Graydon Carter) (Miramax Books, 2006)
- Reset: How This Crisis Can Restore Our Values and Renew America (Random House, 2009)
- Fantasyland: How America Went Haywire: A 500-Year History (Random House, 2017) ISBN 978-1400067213
- Evil Geniuses: The Unmaking of America: A Recent History (Random House, 2020)
- Hasta La Vista America: Trump's Farewell Address (Pushkin Industries, 2021)

=== Essays, reporting, and other contributions ===
- Andersen, Kurt, "You Say You Want a Devolution", Vanity Fair, January 2012 (examines the sociopolitical roots of populist movements such as the Occupy movement and the Tea Party)
- Andersen, Kurt (March 2018). "How to talk Trump". Dispatches. Lexicon. The Atlantic. 321 (2): 27.
- Andersen, Kurt, "The Anti-vaccine Right Brought Human Sacrifice to America", The Atlantic, January 25, 2022
- Andersen, Kurt, "‘Succession’ Nailed the Unreal Way We Live Now", The New York Times, May 29, 2023
- Andersen, Kurt, "Bill Ackman Is a Brilliant Fictional Character", The Atlantic, January 18, 2024
- Andersen, Kurt, "RFK Jr. Was My Drug Dealer", The Atlantic, August 23, 2024
