= The End of the Twentieth Century =

Sculpture by Joseph Beuys

The End of the Twentieth Century (German:Das Ende des 20. Jahrhunderts) is a monumental installation by the German artist Joseph Beuys from 1983, at the Hamburger Bahnhof, in Berlin.

It consists of large, oblong pieces of basalt, all of which have a conical hole bored into them at one end. In these holes smaller cones of rock have been placed, lined with clay and felt. The rocks evoke bones or corpses, and in their random alignment could produce the sensation in a viewer that "the state of the world is beyond control". This inevitably brings to mind Beuys' experiences during World War II, in which he served as a Luftwaffe pilot and many of his family members were killed. However, the materials of clay and felt symbolize potential growth and "suggest the possibility of new life emerging at the end of a dark century". The project's theme of renewal is closely associated with the project 7000 Oaks, in which basalt stones were paired with oak trees. The impermanence of the materials Beuys chose for the installation has presented problems for conservators.
