= Kristen Ashley bibliography =

This is a comprehensive list of works by author Kristen Ashley, including anthologies co-authored with others and self-published short works.

== Bibliography ==
=== Single novels ===
Title	Year	ISBN	Notes
Heaven and Hell	2011	9781465819062	—
Play It Safe	2012	9781465819062	—
Complicated	2017	9781974503810	
Fast Lane	2019	9780463228456	—

=== Mathilda, SuperWitch ===
#	Title	Year	ISBN	Notes
1	Mathildas Book of Shadows	2011	9781465782502	—
2	Mathilda, Rise of the Dark Lord	2020	9780463385333	—

=== Rock Chick ===
#	Title	Year	ISBN	Notes
1	Rock Chick	2009	9780615770413	—
2	Rock Chick Rescue	2009	9780615764030	—
3	Rock Chick Redemption	2010	9781453720691	—
4	Rock Chick Renegade	2011	9780615774237	—
5	Rock Chick Revenge	2011	9780615782140	—
6	Rock Chick Reckoning	2011	9780615781600	
7	Rock Chick Regret	2011	9780615826110	—
8	Rock Chick Revolution	2012	9780615840840	
8.5	Rock Chick Reawakening	2017	9781942299752	—
9	Rock Chick Reborn	2018	9781986106016	—

=== Colorado Mountain ===
#	Title	Year	ISBN	Notes
1	The Gamble	2011	9781455599066	—
2	Sweet Dreams	2011	9781455599073	
3	Lady Luck	2011	9781455599097	—
4	Breathe	2012	9781455599127	
5	Jagged	2014	9781455599141	—
6	Kaleidoscope	2014	9781455599158	—
7	Bounty	2014	9781310258299	

=== Dream Man ===
#	Title	Year	ISBN	Notes
1	Mystery Man	2011	9781455599172	—
2	Wild Man	2011	9781455599196	—
3	Law Man	2011	9781455599219	
4	Motorcycle Man	2012	9781455599233	
5	Quiet Man	2019	978-1970077247	—

=== Dream Team series ===
#	Title	Year	ISBN	Notes
1	Dream Maker	2020	9781538733868	-

=== Chaos ===
#	Title	Year	ISBN	Notes
1	Own the Wind	2015	9781455599264	—
2	Fire Inside	2013	9781455599288	—
3	Ride Steady	2015	9781455533237	
4	Walk Through Fire	2015	9781455533244	
5	Rough Ride a novella	2018	978-1945920936	—
6	Wild Like the Wind	2018	978-1721232611	
7	Free	2019	978-1731342874	
5	A Christmas to Remember a novella	2013	978-1455529933	—

=== Unfinished Hero ===
#	Title	Year	ISBN	Notes
1	Knight	2012	9781476479217	—
2	Creed	2012	9781301160822	—
3	Raid	2013	9781301513468	—
4	Deacon	2014	9781311133649	
5	Sebring	2016	9780692573761	—

=== The 'Burg ===
#	Title	Year	ISBN	Notes
1	For You	2011	978-0692323663	—
2	At Peace	2011	978-0692352854	—
3	Golden Trail	2011	978-0692410288	—
4	Games of the Heart	2012	978-0692467473	—
5	The Promise	2014	978-0692506127	
6	Hold On	2015	978-0692467459	—

=== Magdalene ===
#	Title	Year	ISBN	Notes
1	The Will	2014	9781311349538	The Will (2020)
2	Soaring	2015	9781311625663	—
3	The Time in Between	2017	9781370357802	—

=== Three Wishes ===
#	Title	Year	ISBN	Notes
1	Three Wishes	2011	978-1542559195	—

=== Ghosts and Reincarnation ===
#	Title	Year	ISBN	Notes
1	Sommersgate House	2011	978-1540438393	—
2	Lacybourne Manor	2011	978-1540457189	—
3	Penmort Castle	2011	978-1540467157	—
4	Fairytale Come Alive	2011	978-1540500472	—
5	Lucky Stars	2012	978-1540561411	—

=== Fantasyland ===
#	Title	Year	ISBN	Notes
1	Wildest Dreams	2011	9781465962669	—
2	The Golden Dynasty	2011	9781466023680	—
3	Fantastical	2011	9781466154568	—
4	Broken Dove	2013	9781310417290	—
5	Midnight Soul	2016	9781311208934	—

=== The Rising ===
#	Title	Year	ISBN	Notes
1	The Beginning of Everything	2019	—	—
2	The Plan Commences	2019	—	—
3	The Dawn of the End	2020	—	—
4	The Rising	2020	—	—

=== The Three ===
#	Title	Year	ISBN	Notes
1	Until the Sun Falls from the Sky	2012	9781465781833	—
2	With Everything I Am	2012	978-0692703212	—
3	Wild and Free	2016	9781310601415	—

=== Honey ===
#	Title	Year	ISBN	Notes
1	The Deep End	2017	9781250121110	—
2	The Farthest Edge	2017	978-1250121134	—
3	The Greatest Risk	2018	978-1250177100	—

=== Loose Ends ===
#	Title	Year	ISBN	Notes
1	Loose Ends, Volume One	2018	978-1726140256	

=== Moonlight & Motor Oil ===
#	Title	Year	ISBN	Notes
1	The Hookup	2017	9781370740475	
2	The Slow Burn	2019	978-1090865687	

=== River Rain series ===
#	Title	Year	ISBN	Notes
1	After The Climb	2020	-	

=== Anthologies ===
#	Title	Year	ISBN	Notes
1	A Christmas to Remember a novella	2012	9781455547760	co-authors: Jill Shalvis, Molly Cannon, Marilyn Pappano, Hope Ramsey

=== Short works ===
- Rock Chick
  - "Rock Chick Redux"
  - "How to be a Rock Chick"
  - "A Rock Chick Valentine"
- Chaos
  - "He's Safe in My Hands"
  - "Kit and Hound do Tequila"
  - "More Pleasure than Pain"
  - "Merry and Bright - An Elvira Christmas Story"
  - "You Did It, Baby"
