= Emily Flake =

American cartoonist and illustrator

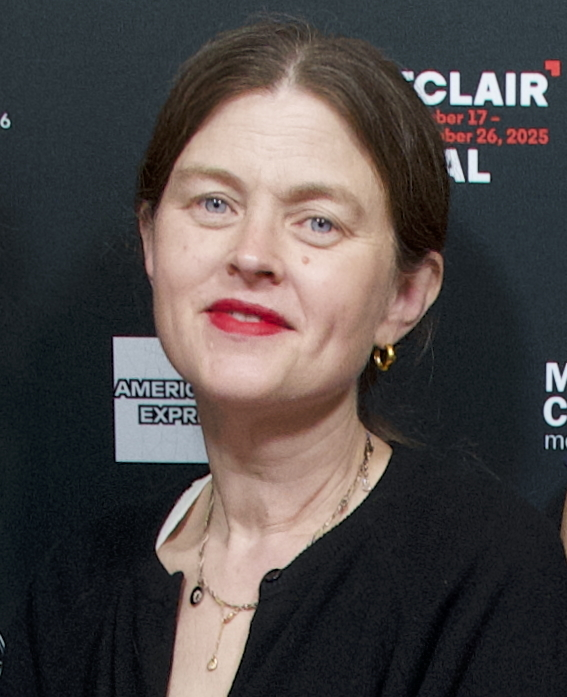
Flake at the 2025 Montclair Film Festival

Emily Suzanne Flake (born June 16, 1977) is an American cartoonist and illustrator. Her work has appeared in The New Yorker, The New York Times, Time and many other publications. Her weekly comic strip Lulu Eightball has appeared in numerous alternative newsweeklies since 2002.

== Personal life ==
Flake was born in Manchester, Connecticut. She now lives in Brooklyn, New York. Her influences include Winsor McCay, Harold Gray, Shel Silverstein, and Bruce Eric Kaplan.

== Education ==
She received a Bachelor of Fine Arts in illustration from Maryland Institute College of Art in 1999.

== Awards ==
In 2008, Flake won a Prism Award for her book These things ain't gonna smoke themselves.

== Bibliography ==
- Lulu Eightball. Atomic Book Company. 2006.
- These things ain't gonna smoke themselves : a ~~love~~ ~~hate~~ ~~love~~ ~~hate~~ ~~love~~ letter to a very bad habit. New York: Bloomsbury. 2007.
- Lulu Eightball : volume 2. Atomic Book Company. 2009.
- Mama Tried: Dispatches from the Seamy Underbelly of Modern Parenting. Grand Central Publishing. 2015.
- That was awkward : the art and etiquette of the awkward hug. New York: Viking. 2019. ISBN 9781984879585.
