= Turn of the Century =

1999 novel by Kurt Andersen

- Turn of the Century
- Author: Kurt Andersen
- Language: English
- Publisher: Random House
- Publication date: May 4, 1999
- Media type: hardcover
- Pages: 659
- ISBN: 0375500081

Turn of the Century is a novel by Kurt Andersen published in 1999.
