= The Buddha in the Attic =

2011 novel by Julie Otsuka

- First edition
- Author: Julie Otsuka
- Language: English
- Published: Alfred A. Knopf
- Publication place: United States
- Awards: PEN/Faulkner Award for Fiction
- Preceded by: When the Emperor was Divine

The Buddha in the Attic is a 2011 novel written by American author Julie Otsuka about Japanese picture brides immigrating to America in the early 1900s. It is Otsuka's second novel. The novel was published in the United States in August 2011 by the publishing house Knopf Publishing Group.

The Buddha in the Attic was nominated for a National Book Award for Fiction (2011) and won the Langum Prize for American Historical Fiction (2011), the PEN/Faulkner Award for Fiction (2012), and the Prix Femina Étranger (2012).

== Plot ==
There is no plot in the usual sense of specific individuals going through particular events. The novel is told in the first person plural, from the point of view of many girls and women, none of whom is individualized as a continuing character, but all of whom are vividly described in a sentence or two. The first chapter, "Come, Japanese!" describes a boatload of Japanese picture brides coming to California to marry men they have never met. The next chapter, "First Night", is about the consummation of their marriages with their new husbands, most of whom are nothing like the descriptions they had given. The third chapter, "Whites", describes the women's lives in their new country and their relationship with their American bosses and neighbors. Some of the women become migrant laborers living in rural shacks, some are domestic workers living in the servants' quarters of suburban homes, and some set up businesses and living quarters in the "Japantown", or "J-Town", area of big cities. "Babies" tells about giving birth and "Children" about raising American-born children, who want to speak only English and are ashamed of their immigrant parents, but are discriminated against by most of their classmates, neighbors and merchants. "Traitors" describes the effect of the Pearl Harbor attack and World War II on the families: the rumors and increasingly the reality of Japanese men being arrested without warning, the fear and eventually the reality of entire families being sent away to parts unknown. "Last Day" tells of the departure of the Japanese from their homes, jobs and schools. The final chapter, "A Disappearance," is told from the point of view of the white American families left behind, who at first miss their Japanese neighbors but gradually forget about them.

== Reception ==
The New York Times compares the book to "the Japanese art of sumi-e, strokes of ink are brushed across sheets of rice paper, the play of light and dark capturing not just images but sensations, not just surfaces but the essence of what lies within. Simplicity of line is prized, extraneous detail discouraged. ... Otsuka’s incantatory style pulls her prose close to poetry."

The Guardian says, "This is a small jewel of a book, its planes cut precisely to catch the light so that the sentences shimmer in your mind long after turning the final page. With The Buddha in the Attic, Julie Otsuka has developed a literary style that is half poetry, half narration – short phrases, sparse description, so that the current of emotion running through each chapter is made more resonant by her restraint."

The Chicago Tribune says, "Read the book in a single sitting, and this chorus of narrators speaks in a poetry that is both spare and passionate, sure to haunt even the most coldhearted among us."

The Washington Independent Review of Books says "Though Knopf, publisher of The Buddha in the Attic, classifies the book as a novel, it is more like a beautifully rendered emakimono, hand-painted horizontal scrolls that depict a series of scenes, telling a story in frozen moments."

== Prizes ==
- Prix Femina Étranger 2012, France
