= Evil Geniuses: The Unmaking of America =

2020 non-fiction book by Kurt Andersen

Evil Geniuses
- Author: Kurt Andersen
- Language: English
- Published: August 11, 2020
- Publisher: Random House
- Publication place: United States
- ISBN: 9781984801340

Evil Geniuses: The Unmaking of America: A Recent History is a nonfiction book by Kurt Andersen, published in August 2020. It entered The New York Times Best Seller list for nonfiction at number 7, The Washington Post list at number 9, and the Los Angeles Times list at number 5. In January 2021, Evil Geniuses was number 14 on the bestsellers list of the American Booksellers Association.

== Summary ==
Evil Geniuses examines coordinated efforts to implement conservative economic and political policies in the United States from the 1970s to 2020, and discusses how the resulting unfettered laissez-faire approach to capitalism has resulted in an extreme level of economic inequality.

=== Part One ===
In "Part One: A Brief History of America", Andersen frames the development of what would become the United States as a society with an unprecedented openness to all that is new. Based on ideals of the Age of Enlightenment and embracing the Industrial Revolution while pursuing growth by pushing out the frontier, Americans saw newness and modernization as progress. At the same time, society indulged in waves of nostalgia. During the period of 1600 to the 1960s, Andersen shows how economic growth led to social progress. In the late 1800s, there was a shift toward economic fairness being considered part of the social contract.

Evil Geniuses describes the economic checks and balances that were put into place to achieve a balance between fairness and security, such as unions, laws on minimum wage and child labor, regulatory agencies and antitrust laws, the non-profit Blue Cross and Blue Shield associations, and New Deal programs. The book describes this period as "[M]aking our vision of capitalism more fair, less harsh, and politically sustainable, a robust foundation for a growing middle class whose spending fueled more economic growth and a society that made most of its citizens reasonable content and proud."

The civil unrest and counterculture of the 1960s, bringing rapid changes that at times seemed wild and out of control, resulted in an emotional backlash throughout society and began a lengthy period of longing for a "simpler" or "better" idealized past.

=== Part Two ===
"Part Two: Turning Point" examines the 1970s. Liberal books Silent Spring, Unsafe at Any Speed, and The Greening of America are widely influential, and while 70% of Americans in 1968 felt that businesses fairly balance profits and public interest, by 1970 only 33% agreed with that statement. The growing distrust of "big business" causes consternation among capitalists. The conflicts from the 1960s and the continuing Vietnam War cause distrust of the government to spread on the left while taxes and increasing regulations encourage a resistance to government on the right. The mid-1970s are America's peak of economic equality with the national consensus still expecting the government to act on behalf of the public good. At the same time, Americans have become overwhelmed by novelty. A longing for more comfortable, familiar times turns into a "national immersion in nostalgia".

Coordinated plans by conservative corporate interests sparked efforts to realize the vision of the Powell Memorandum, which described a four-front conservative war on academia, media, politics, and the legal system to counter trends in liberalism and restraints on capitalism. This period saw the founding or expansion of the Pacific Legal Foundation and Mountain States Legal Foundation, the Business Roundtable, American Enterprise Institute, Hoover Institution, and The Cato Institute. The book Anarchy, State, and Utopia argued for a minimal state. Regulations were rolled back and antitrust efforts dwindled. The Friedman doctrine emboldened big business to place profits above all other considerations. The counterculture's "do your own thing" became the capitalists' "every man for himself".

=== Part Three ===
"Part Three: Wrong Turn" sees the 1980 election of Ronald Reagan, who famously claimed, "Government is not the solution to our problem; government is the problem." As the recession ended and the stock market was booming, Congress made the top tax rate the lowest in 50 years. William D. Cohan is quoted as saying about the finance industry, "Starting in 1970, prudence gave way to pure greed." There was a proliferation of complex derivatives, incognito leverage, mortgage-backed securities, leveraged buyouts and venture capital, hedge funds, junk bonds, as well as the start of 401(k)s which opened an immense new revenue stream for Wall Street while enticing employers to do away with traditional pension plans, coupled with deregulation laws and tax changes. The top income tax rate went from 70% to 50% in 1982, then to 38.5%, then to 28% in 1986. Grover Norquist's Taxpayer Protection Pledge enforced hard-right orthodoxy.

Michael Horowitz wrote a memo on behalf of the Sarah Scaife Foundation that laid out a three-pronged vision for conservative influence in the legal system: recruit top students from top law schools; "adopt and fund a strategy that sought a genuine right-wing revolution in the high-end legal profession and judiciary"; the movement needed to appear philosophical, idealistic, and independent. The Federalist Society addressed the first prong. Two legal movements gained adherents: originalism and law and economics, with a common mission to "utterly remake our society and political economy using the legal system, to make both resemble their vision of the American good old days".

The U.S. saw a "promiscuous deregulation frenzy" and the rapid growth of conservative institutions such as Manhattan Institute for Policy Research, The Heritage Foundation, George Mason University, Mercatus Center, Institute for Humane Studies, ALEC, and Citizens for a Sound Economy. The books Losing Ground and Wealth and Poverty argued against welfare policies and for supply-side economics. The FCC fairness doctrine was eliminated. The political economy was changing from "a more or less win-win game to one that was practically zero-sum".

Trends that diminished the power of workers included offshoring, gutting organized labor (air traffic controller strike), right-to-work laws, outsourcing, and noncompete agreements even for some minimum wage workers. Bill Clinton signed the Personal Responsibility and Work Opportunity Act, "another illustration of how thoroughly the right's ideas became the governing consensus and how liberals fell down on the job by accepting—or at least not forthrightly rejecting—the instinct to blame the losers, in our extreme free-market society, for being losers, and by disclaiming social responsibility for properly helping them." Also under Clinton, in 1999 the Gramm–Leach–Bliley Act repealed part of the Glass–Steagall Act of 1933, removing barriers in the market among banking companies, securities companies and insurance companies that prohibited any one institution from acting as any combination of an investment bank, a commercial bank, and an insurance company, and then the Commodity Futures Modernization Act of 2000 removed regulation of derivatives.

=== Part Four ===
In "Part Four: Same Old Same Old", nostalgia is in full-swing, recycling old TV shows, movies, musicals, and fashion. Even the cultural genre of the future, science fiction, spawned a nostalgic subgenre, steampunk. Photos of people from the 1980s would not look out of place in the streets today. Where earlier decades had distinctive cultural characters, the character of the 1980s had merely continued through the following decades: "the eighties never ended". On music, the book quotes Simon Reynolds, "Is nostalgia stopping our culture's ability to surge forward, or are we nostalgic precisely because our culture has stopped moving forward and so we inevitably look back to more momentous and dynamic times?"

Evil Geniuses suggests that a modern-day Rip van Winkle who had fallen asleep in the 1970s and awoken in the 1990s would be aghast at the country's relapse into another Gilded Age. Andersen proposes that the lengthy retreat into nostalgia was a reaction to the economic changes of the '80s and '90s, "a kind of national cultural self-medication". Politics, in turn, became "fights over which parts of the past should or shouldn't and can or can't be recycled or restored."

A 1998 proposal was written by the American Petroleum Institute to promote scientific uncertainty on climate change, followed by a 2002 memo by Frank Luntz that encouraged increasing climate-change-denial propaganda and recommended using climate change rather than global warming.

The early vision of the Federalist Society has been realized, with many federal judges and a majority of the Supreme Court members having been Federalist Society members. Right-wing money spent on universities, think tanks, and the legal profession is a long-term investment toward influencing ideology and public policies. Lobbying expenditures have more than doubled since 1998, with 95 of the 100 top-spending groups representing business interests. Republican candidates found the Club for Growth the largest source for campaign money.

Antitrust efforts have been extinguished and industries have become concentrated in oligopolies. Excessively large and powerful companies are relieved of the pressure of competing on price. In the 1980s, American companies averaged 18% markup over costs; in 2020, the average markup is 67%. America is in a vicious cycle in which enormous economic inequality buys political leverage which increases the inequality enabling them to buy even more political power. The result is a class war in which, Warren Buffett said, "it's my class, the rich class, that's making war".

All developed countries confronted similar economic challenges from the '70s through the '90s, such as slower economic growth, machines replacing workers, and cheaper manufacturing in poorer countries. Part 4 examines the differences in how countries responded to those economic challenges which resulted in very different levels of economic inequality between the U.S. and other highly developed nations. On the Gini index which provides a standard measure of inequality, America today is the most unequal of rich countries, ranking a bit lower than Haiti and a bit higher than Uruguay. Within the Organisation for Economic Co-operation and Development (OECD), an organization of the world's most developed countries, only Turkey, Mexico, Costa Rica, Chile, and South Africa are more economically unequal. America is also shown to be exceptional (in a negative sense) when looking at differences in healthcare spending, healthcare quality, and life expectancies, as well as the costs of higher education.

=== Part Five ===
In, "Part Five: Make America New Again", Evil Geniuses points out that the number of both blue-collar and white-collar jobs with good salaries and benefits has drastically decreased. People are being replaced by automation and robots and pushed into occupations that are not as easily automated but tend to pay less. Andersen compares General Motors and AT&T in 1962 with Apple and Google in 2020: the former employed more than a million people, while the latter with revenues and profit margins twice as high employ only a quarter-million people. America's permissive approach to antitrust enforcement results in anticompetitive monopolies such as Google and Facebook. Andersen points out, "[N]ew technology enabled but did not require a global digital-information duopoloy consisting of Google and Facebook. As consumers and citizens, we and our government let it happen." Andersen points out that distrust in the government has led to resistance to allowing the government to do anything, equating it to an unhappy marriage where divorce is impossible and one of the parties is invested in keeping the marriage unhappy. He notes that in 2018, The Wall Street Journal found that 58% of people want the government to do more to help people.

Expected advances in automation and artificial intelligence will, in the near future, cause even workers to become economically obsolete. On top of the current economic and political inequality, America (along with the rest of the world) faces the challenges of the COVID-19 pandemic and its aftermath, as well as changes in the global climate. Andersen considers the U.S. to be at an inflection point, which Andy Grove described in 1996 as when "fundamentals are about to change." For the U.S. to survive and prosper, a more democratic and sustainable form of capitalism is critical.

Evil Geniuses concludes, "For Americans now, will surviving a year (or more) of radical uncertainty help persuade a majority to make radical changes in our political economy to reduce their chronic economic uncertainty and insecurity? ... Or will Americans remain hunkered forever, as confused and anxious and paralyzed as we were before 2020, descend into digital feudalism, forgo a renaissance and retreat into cocoons of comfortable cultural stasis providing the illusion that nothing much is changing or ever can change?"

== Reception ==
Anand Giridharadas's review in The New York Times says "It is a radicalized moderate's moderate case for radical change" and summarizes the recommendations in it as "Winning back America as a country that works for Americans will be the battle of a generation, and this book raises the question of whether the left should seek to achieve that country by embracing the cabalistic power-building, linguistic cunning, intellectual patronage and media stewardship the right has employed."

Publishers Weekly says "Much of Andersen's material will be familiar to newshounds, but he arranges it into a cohesive argument backed by hard data and stinging prose." Kirkus Reviews calls it "A rousing call for desperately needed systemic transformation."

A review in Religion Dispatches describes the book as "an extended mea culpa for his own inability, and the inability of culture liberals like him, to grasp what said geniuses were doing to remake the political economy" and says "Andersen deserves credit for showing how an ever-more-powerful overclass has shaped the political economy we all inhabit", but criticizes the book for failing to fully engage with the issue of racism and not addressing what it calls The Righteous Mind problem: "how the lasting legacy of Puritanism tends to undergird deference toward the wealthy while fueling reaction against the ironic counterculture that Andersen himself helped to create."

A review in the Chicago Tribune says "The elements he is able to pull together and weave into a narrative that so convincingly pinpoints how we arrived at this moment are consistently novel and interesting."

Tom Krattenmaker in The Humanist says Evil Geniuses "demonstrates a remarkable ability to see through to the truth of the politics and culture of recent decades, and to make sense of them in a way with crucial relevance to now."

Evil Geniuses was Steven Soderbergh's inspiration for his 2023 science fiction series, Command Z.

== See also ==
- Dark Money
