= How to Lose Friends and Alienate People =

How to Lose Friends and Alienate People may refer to:

- How to Lose Friends and Alienate People, a 1937 book by Irving D. Tressler.
- How to Lose Friends & Alienate People (memoir), a 2001 memoir by Toby Young
- How to Lose Friends & Alienate People (film), the 2008 film based on said memoir

== See also ==
- How to Win Friends and Influence People
