= James Corden =

English actor and comedian (born 1978)

James Corden OBE
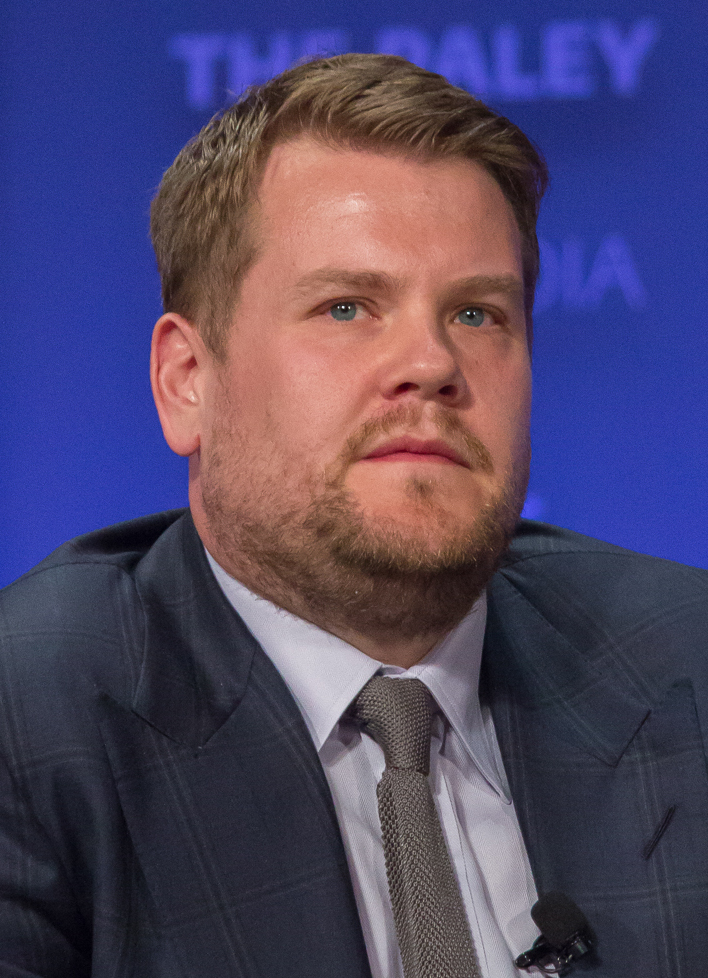
- Corden at the 2015 PaleyFest
- Born: James Kimberley Corden; 22 August 1978 (age 48); Hillingdon, London, England
- Education: Holmer Green Upper School
- Occupations: Actor; comedian; writer; producer; singer; television host
- Years active: 1996–present
- Spouse: Julia Carey (m. 2012)
- Children: 3
- Awards: Full list

Comedy career
- Medium: Television; film; theatre; podcast
- Genres: Observational comedy; sketch comedy; musical comedy; physical comedy; satire
- Subjects: American politics; British politics; English culture; American culture; current events; pop culture; everyday life; social awkwardness

Signature
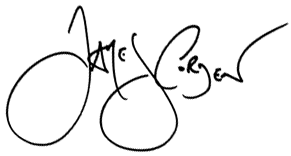

James Kimberley Corden (born 22 August 1978) is an English actor, comedian, writer, producer, singer, and television host. In the United Kingdom, he is best known for co-writing and starring in the critically acclaimed BBC sitcom Gavin & Stacey. In the United States, he gained recognition as the host of The Late Late Show with James Corden, a late-night talk show that aired on CBS from 2015 to 2023.

Originally airing from 2007 to 2010, Corden co-wrote and co-starred with Welsh actress Ruth Jones in Gavin & Stacey, for which he won the BAFTA Television Award for Best Comedy Performance. He was featured, along with grime artist Dizzee Rascal, on the UK number one single "Shout". Corden created his Carpool Karaoke sketch in 2011. He hosted the Brit Awards (2009, 2011 and 2014), the Tony Awards (2016 and 2019), and the Grammy Awards (2017 and 2018). From 2010 to 2019, he presented the panel show A League of Their Own on Sky One.

Corden has acted in films, including Gulliver's Travels (2010), Kill Your Friends (2015), and Peter Rabbit (2018) and its 2021 sequel (in which he voiced the title character). He also acted in the musical films Into the Woods (2014), Cats (2019), The Prom (2020), and Cinderella (2021).

In 2011, Corden starred in the National Theatre show One Man, Two Guvnors, which transferred from the West End to Broadway, where Corden won the Tony Award for Best Actor in a Play. In 2015, he received the BAFTA Britannia Award for British Artist of the Year. Corden has been nominated for 29 Primetime Emmy Awards, winning 12 in total, including for The Late Late Show, Carpool Karaoke, and hosting the 70th Tony Awards. He was appointed an Officer of the Order of the British Empire (OBE) in the 2015 New Year Honours for services to drama.

== Early life and education ==
Corden was born in Hillingdon, Greater London, the son of Margaret and Malcolm Corden. His father was a musician in the Central Band of the Royal Air Force, and later became a salesman of Christian books and Bibles. Corden's mother was a social worker. He grew up in Hazlemere, Buckinghamshire, and attended Park Middle School and Holmer Green Upper School. He has two sisters.

== Career ==
=== 1996–2006: Early career ===
Corden's first stage appearance was at the age of 18, with a one-line part in the 1996 musical Martin Guerre. His first TV reporter role was on the BBC's Good Morning with Anne and Nick, interviewing Meat Loaf. His early television work included Gareth Jones in the 1999 series Boyz Unlimited. He also starred in Tango advertisements in 1998, had a role as a bookish student in Teachers, and in 2000 had a small part in an episode of Hollyoaks. Corden had guest appearances on Little Britain and Dalziel and Pascoe, both in 2004. Corden's early film credits include Whatever Happened to Harold Smith? (1999), Mike Leigh's All or Nothing (2002), Heartlands (2002), and Cruise of the Gods (2002).

From 2000 to 2005, Corden starred on the British television series Fat Friends as Jamie Rymer. He garnered a nomination for the 2000 Royal Television Society Award for Network Newcomer On Screen for his work. Beginning in 2004, Corden played the role of Timms in the original London stage production of Alan Bennett's play The History Boys, as well as in the Broadway, Sydney, Wellington, and Hong Kong productions. He was also in the radio and 2006 film adaptation versions of the play. In 2006, he appeared in the film Starter for 10.

=== 2007–2010: Gavin & Stacey and rise to prominence ===
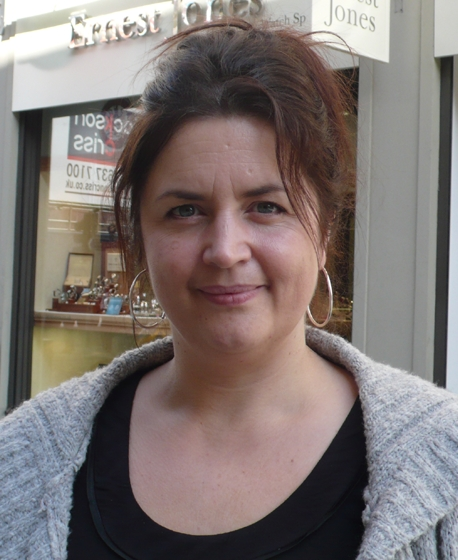
Corden co-created the sitcom Gavin & Stacey with Ruth Jones.

From 2007 to 2010, Corden co-starred in his own series, the BBC Three sitcom Gavin & Stacey. He co-wrote the series with his Fat Friends co-star Ruth Jones; Corden and Jones played the friends of the title characters, with Corden starring as Smithy. The series proved popular and was well-received critically. For the show, Corden won Best Male Comedy Performer and Gavin & Stacey won Best New British Television Comedy at the 2007 British Comedy Awards. At the 2008 Television BAFTAs, Corden won the BAFTA for Best Male Comedy Performance, and Gavin & Stacey won the BAFTA's Audience Award for Programme of the Year. In December 2008, the show won Best TV Comedy in the 2008 British Comedy Awards. Gavin & Stacey also won the award for Most Popular Comedy Programme at the National Television Awards in 2010. In 2019, Gavin & Stacey returned for a Christmas special, which achieved the highest Christmas Day viewership in the UK for more than a decade.

During the two year and seven months run of Gavin & Stacey, Corden's professional endeavours outside the successful series proved somewhat chequered. He guest hosted Big Brother's Big Mouth, with Gavin & Stacey co-star Mathew Horne, in August 2007. In 2008, he appeared in the film of Toby Young's 2001 autobiography How to Lose Friends & Alienate People. He collaborated again with Horne on a 2009 sketch show named Horne & Corden, described by the BBC as a "traditional comedy entertainment show in the style of Morecambe and Wise". The show ran for only one series and was poorly received by the critics, with Corden later admitting "the absolute truth is I wasn't good enough."

In 2009, Corden starred in the film Lesbian Vampire Killers, which was unsuccessful. That year he played Clem Cattini in the Joe Meek biopic Telstar, and likewise in the animated Planet 51 along with Mathew Horne. In February 2009, he co-presented the Brit Awards with Horne and Kylie Minogue. In March 2009, he appeared in a sketch for the UK charity telethon Comic Relief giving the England football team a motivational talk, and later presented a section with Horne showing their best bits of comedy from the previous two years along with highlights from the night.

In March 2010, Corden began hosting the Sky 1 comedy/sports panel show A League of Their Own alongside team captains Andrew Flintoff and Jamie Redknapp. In March 2010, he presented Sport Relief 2010 alongside Davina McCall and others, contributing a "sequel" to the 2009 England football team sketch, this time giving a motivational talk to various sports stars including David Beckham and motor racing driver Jenson Button.

In March 2010, Corden took part in Channel 4's Comedy Gala, a benefit show held in aid of Great Ormond Street Children's Hospital, filmed live at the O2 Arena in London. On 5 June 2010, he performed his England World Cup single with Dizzee Rascal on the finale of Britain's Got Talent. The proceeds from the single went to London's Great Ormond Street Hospital.

In June 2010, Corden played Craig Owens in the Doctor Who episode "The Lodger", in which the Doctor moved in with him. Corden returned as Owens in "Closing Time" in the sixth series. In December 2010, This Is JLS, an hour-long Christmas special featuring the boyband and The X Factor runners-up, was aired on ITV1, with Corden writing and producing some of the sketches featured in the special. In 2010, he was in the main cast of the film Gulliver's Travels. In December 2010, he was part of an ensemble voice cast in the English dub of the German animated film Animals United alongside Jim Broadbent, Jason Donovan, Joanna Lumley, Billie Piper, Andy Serkis and others.

=== 2011–2014: One Man, Two Guvnors ===
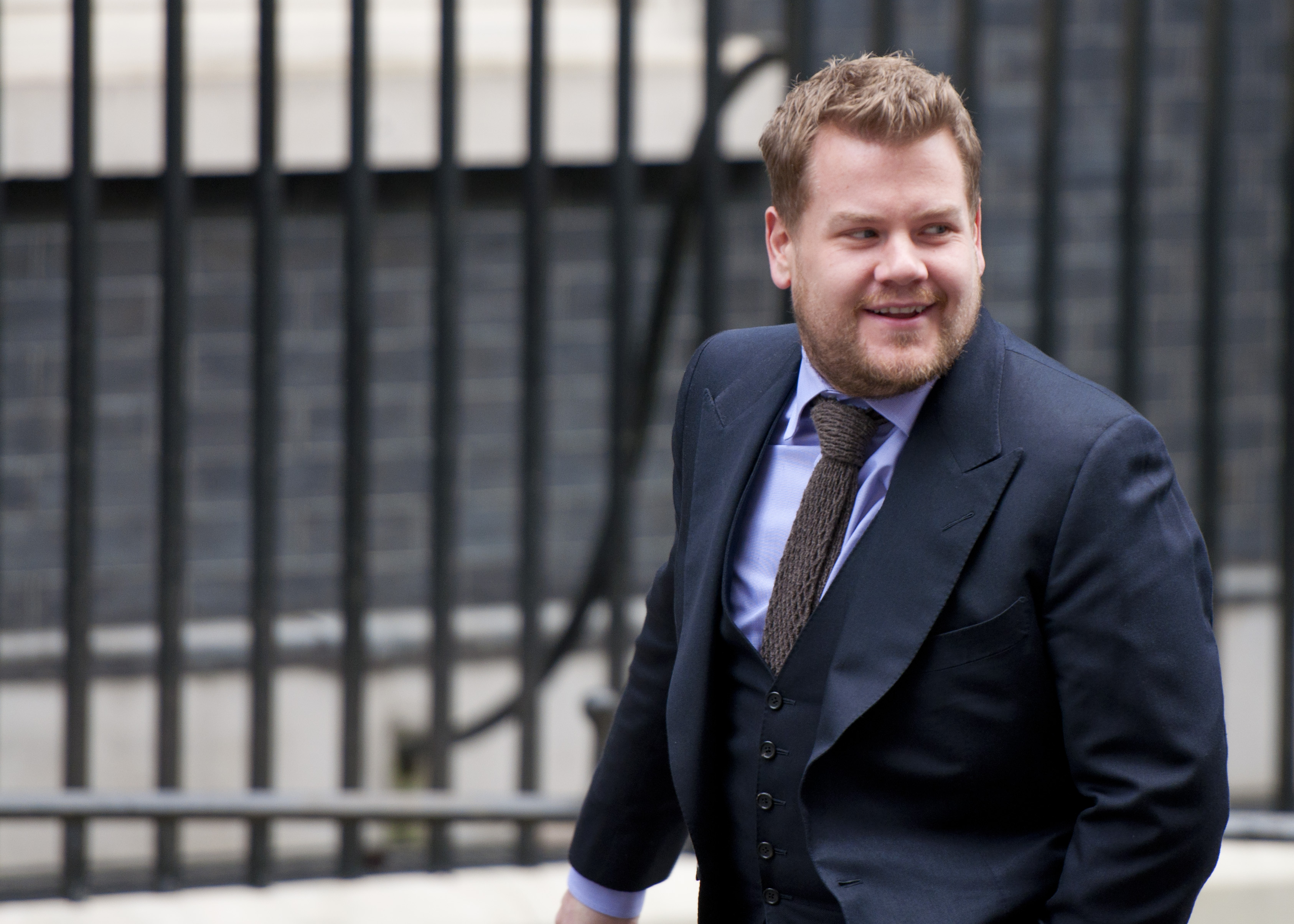
Corden arriving at 10 Downing Street to interview then British Prime Minister David Cameron in March 2014

In February 2011, Corden presented the 2011 Brit Awards. In March, Corden reprised his Gavin & Stacey role as Smithy in a Red Nose Day sketch for the charity telethon Comic Relief. The sketch included appearances by then UK Prime Minister Gordon Brown, JLS, Paul McCartney, and Justin Bieber. The show also featured the first appearance of his Carpool Karaoke sketch, in which he sang songs with pop star George Michael while driving around London. In 2011, he appeared in The Three Musketeers.

Starting in June 2011, Corden played the lead role in the hit comedy play One Man, Two Guvnors. The play was cinecast worldwide as part of the National Theatre Live cinecasts, and transferred from the National Theatre to the West End after touring. The show received universal critical acclaim and won Best Play at the Evening Standard Theatre Awards for 2011. The Guardian deemed it "A triumph of visual and verbal comedy. One of the funniest productions in the National's history." The Daily Telegraph described it as "the feelgood hit of the Summer"; while The Independent called it a "massive hit", and the Evening Standard "a surefire hit".

Corden made a cameo appearance in the music video for the single "Mama Do the Hump" by Rizzle Kicks, released in December 2011, which reached No. 2 in the charts. In April 2012, One Man, Two Guvnors transferred to Broadway, with Corden continuing to play the lead. In June 2012, he won the Tony Award for Best Performance by a Leading Actor in a Play for his performance.

In February 2012, Corden hosted the Brit Awards for the third time. Corden starred as the Baker in the Disney film adaptation of the musical Into the Woods (2014). In 2015, Corden narrated Roald Dahl's Esio Trot, a BBC television film adaptation of Roald Dahl's classic novel. Adapted by Richard Curtis and co-starring Dustin Hoffman and Judi Dench, it was broadcast on BBC One on 1 January 2015. In 2016, he appeared in the animated comedy film Trolls as Biggie, a chubby friendly Troll.

For his next project, Corden teamed up with friend and fellow Gavin & Stacey star Mathew Baynton to create, write, and star in The Wrong Mans, a six-part comedy-thriller for BBC Two. The premiere was in September 2013. The series was co-produced by online television provider Hulu in the United States, and it began airing in November 2013.

=== 2015–2023: The Late Late Show and stardom ===
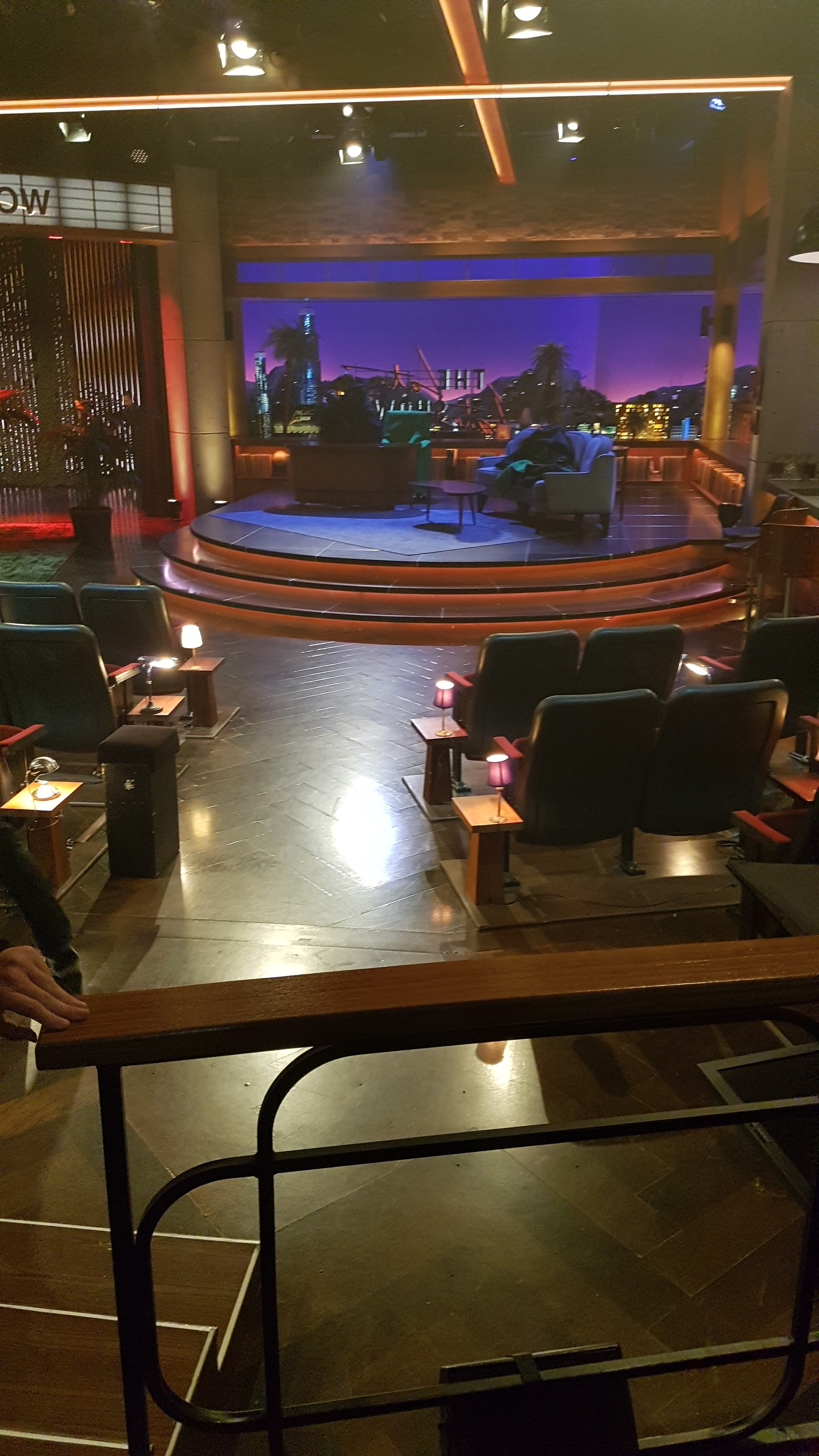
The Late Late Show with James Corden set

In March 2015, Corden succeeded Craig Ferguson as host of the American late-night talk show The Late Late Show. Corden's most popular comedic segments included "Drop the Mic", "Fill Your Guts or Spill Your Guts", "Crosswalk the Musical", and "Carpool Karaoke".

Talking to David Tennant on his BBC Podcast David Tennant Does a Podcast With..., Tennant asked how much of The Late Late Show was him and how much was acting, to which Corden replied: "...I would hope it's a close strain to me, I would hope that I am someone looks for the joy in things and stuff, you're not [pause] ever really being your ...self"

Corden's Carpool Karaoke through the streets of London with pop singer Adele, a sketch that was featured on his talk show in January 2016, was the biggest viral video on YouTube in 2016. Corden did numerous editions of Carpool Karaoke with singers such as Sir Elton John, Stevie Wonder, Mariah Carey, Madonna, Jennifer Lopez, Harry Styles, and Katy Perry. Apple TV+ adapted the segment into a streaming series Carpool Karaoke: The Series.

Corden's special Carpool Karaoke: When Corden Met McCartney, Live From Liverpool with Sir Paul McCartney was a viral and critical success earning a Primetime Emmy Award nomination and win for Outstanding Variety Special. In the special, Corden and McCartney sang the Beatles songs "Drive My Car", "Penny Lane", and "Let It Be". The pair stopped by a Penny Lane street sign, which McCartney signed. McCartney pointed out various Liverpool landmarks, including Saint Barnabas Church, where he had been a choir boy, and also visited his childhood home. The special ended with McCartney and his band surprising a small group of locals at Liverpool's Philharmonic Pub with a 13-song set that included "A Hard Day's Night", "Back in the U.S.S.R" and his new single, "Come On to Me".

Corden hosted the Tony Awards in 2016 and 2019, and the Grammy Awards in 2017 and 2018. In 2018, the Seatbelt Psychic television series was produced by Corden and his production company Fulwell 73 for Lifetime platform.

In 2019, Corden starred in Tom Hooper's feature film adaptation of Andrew Lloyd Webber's popular musical Cats as Bustopher Jones, which received widespread negative attention. The film also featured Jennifer Hudson, Idris Elba, Taylor Swift, Ian McKellen, and Judi Dench. Some critics called it one of the worst films of the year due to its poorly conceived CGI and off kilter comedic performances from Rebel Wilson and Corden. For his performance, Corden received the Razzie Award for Worst Supporting Actor of the year. Lloyd Webber was a vocal critic of the film, specially criticizing Corden's performance, adding he "begged for it to be cut".

Corden's leading role in the 2020 musical comedy film The Prom received negative reviews, and was named "one of the worst performances of the 21st century" by Vanity Fair's Richard Lawson. Lawson elaborated, writing: "Corden, flitting and lisping around in the most uninspired of caricatures, misses all potential for nuance, and thus never finds even a hint of truth in the role". His portrayal of a gay man while he himself is straight was deemed offensive by many film critics and members of the LGBTQ community, with critics adding that the performance perpetuated and capitalized on stereotypes of gay white men. Corden received an even larger amount of backlash when this performance earned him a Golden Globe Award nomination for Best Actor in a Musical or Comedy Film.

Corden also received negative reviews for his performance in the 2021 adaptation of Cinderella, which he produced. Clarisse Loughrey of The Independent wrote: "James Corden has made a #Girlboss fairytale only a voracious capitalist could love".

In 2021, the Late Late Show segment "Spill Your Guts or Fill Your Guts" was criticised for its "racist" use of Asian cuisine, such as balut and chicken feet. Celebrity guests were made to eat foods that Corden had judged to be "horrific" and "disgusting" or answer a difficult personal question. Corden later agreed to change the foods used.

In April 2022, Corden announced that he would be leaving The Late Late Show in 2023.

=== 2024–present: The Constituent and Gavin & Stacey finale ===
On 20 March 2024, it was announced that Corden would make his return to theatre, starring as Alec in a new political drama by Joe Penhall called The Constituent, opposite Anna Maxwell Martin and directed by Matthew Warchus. The play ran at The Old Vic in London from 13 June to 10 August 2024. Once again teaming up with Ruth Jones, together they wrote and starred in the final episode of Gavin & Stacey, airing on Christmas Day 2024 on BBC One, 17 years after the show was first broadcast.

In September 2025, Corden returned to Broadway at the Music Box Theatre playing Yvan in the revival of Yasmina Reza's play Art opposite Bobby Cannavale and Neil Patrick Harris for a limited season, direct by Scott Ellis.

=== Controversies ===
During his tenure hosting The Late Late Show, Corden faced several controversies. In April 2019, television writer Jack Allison accused Corden of attending a Writers Guild of America meeting without his staffers—accompanied only by an executive producer—to advocate for a new lower pay grade for entry-level writers below union minimums. Allison noted that internships and writers' assistant positions already existed as pipeline opportunities, and characterized the proposal as skeptical given the show's staff were already among television's lowest-paid writers. Corden responded that he sought to "explore whether talented people could get a better opportunity" through 13-week writers' assistant contracts even though these would bypass existing union protections and minimum rates, denying any intent to pay writers less than they deserved. The Writers Guild rejected the proposal as it would have undercut established union minimum rates negotiated in the MBA.

In October 2017, while hosting the amfAR Inspiration Gala in Los Angeles amid emerging allegations of sexual misconduct against Harvey Weinstein, Corden made multiple jokes referencing Weinstein, including one about him requesting massages in his hotel room. The remarks drew groans from the audience and criticism from figures including Rose McGowan; Corden later apologised on Twitter, stating "sexual assault is no laughing matter" and that his intent was to shame Weinstein, not his victims.

In October 2022, Corden was banned from the New York restaurant Balthazar by proprietor Keith McNally, after reportedly being "abusive" and "extremely nasty" to staff. The ban was later rescinded after Corden apologised to McNally in private and in public, admitting that he had been "ungracious". Keith McNally described James Corden as a "tiny cretin" and the "most abusive customer" to his servers in 25 years, citing incidents where Corden berated staff over food errors.

== Influences ==
Corden has said that his comedy influences are Graham Norton, Chris Evans, Jonathan Ross, Conan O'Brien, David Letterman, and Stephen Colbert.

== Politics ==
Corden is a supporter of the Labour Party. In 2019, he criticised Jeremy Corbyn's leadership and expressed support for Tom Watson to lead the party instead. In May 2025, he voiced interest in running for Mayor of London in the 2028 London mayoral election.

== Personal life ==
Corden shared a flat with fellow actor and friend Dominic Cooper for several years. Cooper introduced Corden to his future wife Julia Carey, whom Cooper had known for years. Corden married Carey on 15 September 2012. The Cordens have three children. Corden is a supporter of English football club West Ham United.

Corden was appointed Officer of the Order of the British Empire in the 2015 New Year Honours for services to drama. He received the honour from Princess Anne during a ceremony at Buckingham Palace in June 2015.

Corden resides in Los Angeles with his family. He maintains a home in Belsize Park, London, and Templecombe House at Wargrave in Berkshire.

In April 2020, during the COVID-19 pandemic, Corden paid the salaries of furloughed employees on the Late Late Show. He also launched a fundraising campaign with the NBA to benefit Feed the Children. In January 2022, Corden announced that he had tested positive for COVID-19. He said he was fine and already fully vaccinated and boosted.

== Filmography ==
=== Film ===
Year	Title	Role	Notes
1997	Twenty Four Seven	Carl 'Tonka' Marsh	
1999	Whatever Happened to Harold Smith?	Walter	
2002	All or Nothing	Rory	
2002	Heartlands	Shady	
2005	Pierrepoint	Kirky	
2006	Heroes and Villains	Sam	
2006	The History Boys	Timms	
2006	Starter for 10	Tone	
2008	How to Lose Friends & Alienate People	Post Modern Review Staff #2	
2009	Lesbian Vampire Killers	Fletch	
2009	Telstar	Clem Cattini	
2009	The Boat That Rocked	Bernard	Deleted scenes only
2009	Planet 51	Soldier Vernkot (voice)	
2010	Gulliver's Travels	Jinks	
2010	Animals United	Billy the Meerkat (voice)	English dub
2011	The Three Musketeers	Planchet	
2013	One Chance	Paul Potts	
2013	Begin Again	Steve	
2014	Into the Woods	The Baker	
2015	Kill Your Friends	Waters	
2015	The Lady in the Van	Street trader	
2016	Norm of the North	Laurence (voice)	UK version
2016	Trolls	Biggie (voice)	
2017	The Emoji Movie	Hi-5 (voice)	
2018	Peter Rabbit	Peter Rabbit (voice)	
2018	Ocean's 8	John Frazier	
2018	Smallfoot	Percy (voice)	
2019	Yesterday	Himself	
2019	Cats	Bustopher Jones	
2020	Trolls World Tour	Biggie (voice)	
2020	Superintelligence	Superintelligence (voice)	
2020	The Prom	Barry Glickman	
2021	Peter Rabbit 2: The Runaway	Peter Rabbit (voice)	
2021	Cinderella	James	Also producer
2025	Smurfs	No Name (voice)	
2025	California Schemin'	Music Executive	
2025	The Christophers	Barnaby Sklar	

=== Television ===
Year	Title	Role	Notes
1996	Out of Tune	Lee	Episode: "1.1"
1998	Renford Rejects	Razor #1	Episode: "Don Bruno"
1999	Boyz Unlimited	Gareth	6 episodes
1999–2000	Hollyoaks	Wayne	Episode #1.524
2000–2005	Fat Friends	Jamie Rymer	20 episodes
2001	Jack and the Beanstalk: The Real Story	Bran the Giant's son	TV movie
2001–2003	Teachers	Jeremy	9 episodes
2002	Cruise of the Gods	Russell	TV movie
2004	Little Britain	Dewi Thomas	Episode: "2.3"
2004	Dalziel and Pascoe	Ben Forsythe	Episode: "The Price of Fame"
2007–2010, 2019, 2024	Gavin & Stacey	Neil "Smithy" Smith	22 episodes; also creator, writer, associate producer
2009	Horne & Corden	Various characters	6 episodes; also writer
2009	2009 Brit Awards	Himself (co-host)	TV special
2009	The Gruffalo	Mouse (voice)	TV special
2010	James Corden's World Cup Live	Himself (host)	14 episodes
2010–2011	Doctor Who	Craig Owens	2 episodes: "The Lodger" and "Closing Time"
2010–2019	A League of Their Own	Himself (host)	Series 1–14
2011	Little Charley Bear	Narrator (voice)	22 episodes
2011	2011 Brit Awards	Himself (host)	TV special
2011	The Gruffalo's Child	Mouse (voice)	TV special
2012	Stella	Steven	Episode: "1.10"
2012	2012 Brit Awards	Himself (host)	TV special
2013	2013 Brit Awards	Himself (host)	TV special
2013–2014	The Wrong Mans	Phil Bourne	8 episodes; also creator, writer
2014	2014 Brit Awards	Himself (host)	TV special
2015	Roald Dahl's Esio Trot	Narrator	TV movie
2015–2023	The Late Late Show with James Corden	Himself (host)	1,197 episodes; also writer and producer
2016	70th Tony Awards	Himself (host)	TV special
2016	Beat Bugs	Morgs the Stick Bug (singing voice)	Episode: "I'm a Loser"
2016	Matilda and the Ramsay Bunch	Guest	Series 2 Episode 4
2017	59th Annual Grammy Awards	Himself (host)	TV special
2017	Trolls Holiday	Biggie (voice)	Christmas special
2017–2019	Drop the Mic	Himself	Also executive producer; appeared in 3 episodes as a guest
2017–2023	Carpool Karaoke: The Series	Himself	75 episodes; also executive producer; appeared in 3 episodes as a guest
2018	60th Annual Grammy Awards	Himself (host)	TV special
2018	Ant & Dec's Saturday Night Takeaway	Himself (guest announcer)	Episode #15.3
2018	Happy Together	Himself	Episode: "Pilot"
2018	Us & Them	—	7 episodes; executive producer
2018	Seatbelt Psychic	Producer / Creator	Worked on all of 2 seasons
2019	The World's Best	Himself (host)	12 episodes; also executive producer
2019	73rd Tony Awards	Himself (host)	TV special
2019	Saturday Night Live	Boris Johnson / Himself	Episode: "Jennifer Lopez/DaBaby"
2019	2020 Breakthrough Prize Ceremony	Himself (host)	TV special
2020	Game On!	Himself	Episode: "James Corden and Landon Donovan"; also executive producer
2021	Friends: The Reunion	Himself (host)	TV special
2022	Mammals	Jamie	6 episodes; also executive producer
2023	2023 Breakthrough Prize Ceremony	Himself (host)	TV special
2024	2024 Breakthrough Prize Ceremony	Himself (host)	TV special
2025	2025 Breakthrough Prize Ceremony	Himself (host)	TV special
2026	FIFA World Cup on FOX After Hours with James Corden	Himself (host)	26 episodes; nightly recap during 2026 FIFA World Cup

=== Theatre ===
Year	Title	Role	Location
1996	Martin Guerre	(bit part)	Prince Edward Theatre, West End
2004	The History Boys	Timms	Lyttelton Theatre, Royal National Theatre, London
2006	The History Boys	Timms	Hong Kong Academy for Performing Arts, Hong Kong
2006	The History Boys	Timms	St James, Wellington
2006	The History Boys	Timms	Sydney Theatre, Sydney
2007	The History Boys	Timms	Broadhurst Theatre, Broadway
2007	A Respectable Wedding	Friend	Young Vic, South Bank, London
2011	One Man, Two Guvnors	Francis Henshall	Lyttelton Theatre, Royal National Theatre, London
2011	One Man, Two Guvnors	Francis Henshall	Waterside Theatre, Aylesbury
2011	One Man, Two Guvnors	Francis Henshall	Theatre Royal, Plymouth
2011	One Man, Two Guvnors	Francis Henshall	Lowry Theatre, Salford
2011	One Man, Two Guvnors	Francis Henshall	New Alexandra Theatre, Birmingham
2011	One Man, Two Guvnors	Francis Henshall	King's Theatre, Edinburgh
2011	One Man, Two Guvnors	Francis Henshall	Adelphi Theatre, West End
2012	One Man, Two Guvnors	Francis Henshall	Music Box Theatre, Broadway
2024	The Constituent	Alec	The Old Vic, London
2025	Art	Yvan	Music Box Theatre, Broadway

=== Video games ===
Year	Title	Voice
2008	Fable II	Monty

=== Music videos ===
Year	Title	Artist
2011	"Happy Now"	Take That
2011	"Mama Do the Hump"	Rizzle Kicks
2013	"Queenie Eye"	Paul McCartney
2016	"Can't Stop the Feeling! (First Listen)"	Justin Timberlake

=== Advertising ===
Year	Title	Role
1998	Tango TV Ad	Bullying Victim
2012	Windows Phone (Microsoft)	—N/a
2014	Cadbury's Free the Joy	—N/a
2015	Samsung Galaxy Note Edge	Alter-ego Wilf
2016	Apple Music	—N/a
2016	Sainsbury's	—N/a
2016–2018	Confused.com	Himself

== Discography ==
=== Singles ===
List of singles, with selected chart positions
Title	Year	Peak chart positions		Album
Title	Year	UK	IRL	Album
"Shout" (as Shout for England with Dizzee Rascal)	2010	1	41	Non-album single
"Only You" (with Kylie Minogue)	2015	—	—	Kylie Christmas
"The Greatest Gift" (with Bret McKenzie)	2016	—	—	Non-album singles
"I Promise You"	2018	—	—	Non-album singles
"Percy's Pressure"	2018	—	—	Non-album singles
"—" denotes items which were not released in that country or failed to chart.

=== Other appearances ===
Title	Year	Album	Other artist(s)
"Bustopher Jones: The Cat About Town"	2019	Cats: Highlights from the Motion Picture Soundtrack	—N/a
"The Kind of Friend I Need"	2020	Music Played by Humans	Gary Barlow

== Sources ==
- Corden, James (2011). May I Have Your Attention, Please?: The Autobiography. London: Century. ISBN 978-1846059353. OCLC 751720297.

Media offices
Preceded by Craig Ferguson	Host of The Late Late Show; 2015–2023
