= Graydon Carter =

Canadian journalist (born 1949)

Graydon Carter CM
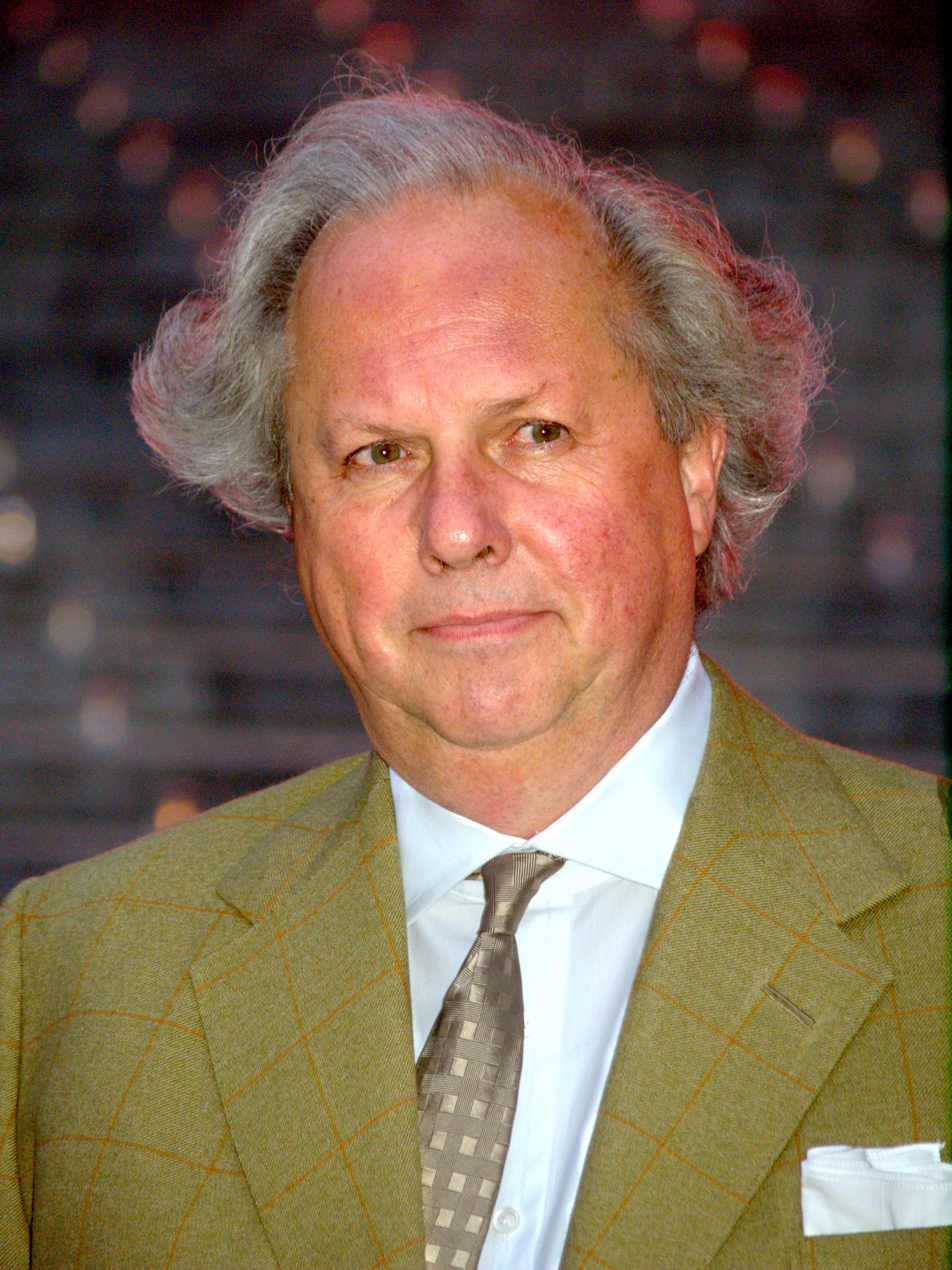
- Carter at the Vanity Fair celebration for the 2009 Tribeca Film Festival
- Born: Edward Graydon Carter; July 14, 1949 (age 77); Toronto, Ontario, Canada
- Occupations: Magazine editor, media founder
- Title: Editor-in-chief, Vanity Fair (1992–2017)
- Spouses: Cynthia Williamson (m. 1982; div. 2000) Anna Scott (m. 2005)
- Children: 5

Edward Graydon Carter, Order of Canada (CM), is a Canadian journalist who was the editor of Vanity Fair from 1992 until 2017. He co-founded, with Kurt Andersen and Thomas L. Phillips, Jr., the satirical monthly magazine Spy in 1986. In 2019, he co-launched a weekly newsletter with Alessandra Stanley called Air Mail for "worldly cosmopolitans".

== Early life ==
In a 2026 interview by Gyles Brandreth, Carter confirmed he has two siblings and that he was born on July 14, 1949. He was named after his father Edward, who was married to his mother, Margaret Carter. His birthplace was Toronto. His father had been a Royal Canadian Air Force pilot. After World War II, the family relocated to Germany for four-years, where Carter was cared for by a local nanny, then they returned to Canada and resided in Trenton, Ontario. At age 19, Carter worked at Symington Yard in Winnipeg as a railroad "groundman, at $2.20 an hour" (rather than as a higher-paid lineman because he "had a fear of heights"). During this time, he pretended to be Jewish. He explained, "I was reading a lot of Kerouac and a lot of Ginsberg ... and I thought, If you’re going to be an intellectual in New York, you gotta be Jewish."

Carter, while attending the University of Ottawa, and Carleton University, married for the first time, but did not graduate from either college.

== Career ==
=== TCR and Time magazine ===
In 1973, Carter co-founded The Canadian Review (TCR), a general interest monthly magazine. By 1977, TCR had become award-winning, and the third-largest magazine of its type in Canada. Despite its critical success, TCR was bankrupt by 1978, reportedly owing $100,000.

In 1978, Carter moved to the United States and began working for Time magazine as a writer-trainee, where he met Kurt Andersen. Carter spent five years writing for Time on the topics of business, law, and entertainment before moving to Life in 1983.

=== Spy magazine ===
In 1986, Carter, Kurt Andersen, and Thomas L. Phillips Jr. founded the "hip humor magazine", Spy, which premiered in print in October 1986, after a $2.8-3.0 million initial fund-raising round (including $30,000 from Phillips Jr.'s father). They ran Spy until February 1991, when European investors Charles Saatchi and Jean-Christophe Pigozzi acquired a majority stake in the company. Carter and Phillips exited immediately and Anderson left two years later. Ultimately, publication of Spy came to an end in 1998. During the final years of Spy, Carter was an editor at The New York Observer, subsequently rebranded The Observer.

=== Vanity Fair magazine ===
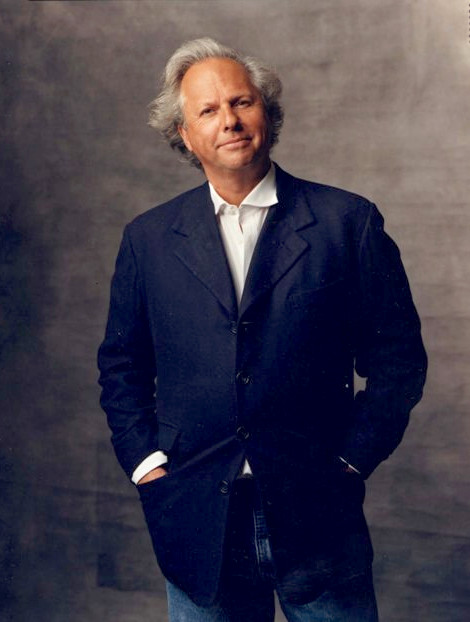
Carter in a publicity shot for Vanity Fair

In 1992, S. I. Newhouse, the chairman of Condé Nast, gave Carter the choice of editing either Vanity Fair or The New Yorker. Carter chose The New Yorker, with his salary to be set at $600,000. The morning he was to be announced as the editor of The New Yorker, however, it was decided (with the reasons why being unclear) that Tina Brown, who was then editing Vanity Fair, would be the new editor of The New Yorker, and that Carter would take over at Vanity Fair.

Carter took the helm of Vanity Fair from Brown in July 1992. Carter's Vanity Fair combined high-profile celebrity cover stories with serious journalism, identifying Mark Felt, as the Deep Throat (Watergate) source and a focus on Jeffrey Epstein's profile, in 2003.

Carter was depicted with an idiosyncratic personal style, in the book, How to Lose Friends & Alienate People, by former Vanity Fair contributing editor, Toby Young and in a 2008 film adaptation of that book, Jeff Bridges portrayed a character closely based on Carter.

On September 6, 2017, Carter announced his departure from the editorship of Vanity Fair in interview with The New York Times, he stated he would be on a "garden leave" until the end of 2017. Since leaving the magazine in 2017, Carter spends part of each year living in France with his third wife.

==== Vicky Ward (Farmer sister) controversy ====
In a 2015 The Daily Beast article, former Vanity Fair journalist Vicky Ward wrote that she had interviewed the family of two young sisters (later identified as Annie and Maria Farmer) and discovered credible reports of molestation amidst a 2003 profile assignment on financier Jeffrey Epstein. The allegations were—Carter claimed in communications with David Folkenflik of NPR—removed from the profile as they did not meet the magazine's legal threshold for publication at the time.

=== Air Mail newsletter ===
In 2019, Carter co-launched a weekly newsletter with Alessandra Stanley, John Tornow (CTO), and Bill Keenan (COO) called Air Mail. In 2025, Air Mail was acquired by Puck. As of October 2025, Carter was believed to be leaving Air Mail as part of the deal.

=== Other enterprises ===
In 2009 Carter and Jeff Klein became partners in the Monkey Bar, a New York City bar and restaurant eatery with a history dating to 1936. Both men sold their interest in the property in 2020.

As of this date, Carter was a co-owner, with his third wife, Anna Scott, of The Waverly Inn in the West Village.

=== Books authored ===
Carter wrote What We've Lost, which was published by Farrar, Straus and Giroux, September in 2004, which has been described in review as a comprehensive critical examination of the Bush administration.

He published his memoir, When the Going was Good: An Editor's Adventures During the Last Golden Age of Magazines, in March 2025.

=== Theatrical and film productions ===
Carter was a producer of I'll Eat You Last, a one-woman play starring Bette Midler, about legendary Hollywood talent agent Sue Mengers. The show, directed by Tony Award-winner Joe Mantello, opened at the Booth Theatre in New York City in April 2013, and at the Geffen Playhouse in Los Angeles on December 3.

Carter has co-produced two documentaries for HBO, Public Speaking (2010), directed by Martin Scorsese, which spotlights writer Fran Lebowitz, about Hollywood producer Jerry Weintraub, and His Way (2011), which was nominated for a Primetime Emmy. He also was a producer of Chicago 10, a documentary which premiered on the opening night of the Sundance Film Festival in early 2007. He was also a producer of Surfwise, which premiered at the Toronto International Film Festival in September 2007, and Gonzo, a biographical documentary of Hunter S. Thompson directed by Alex Gibney.

Carter was an executive producer of the award-winning film, 9/11, a film by Jules and Gedeon Naudet about the September 11 terrorist attacks, which aired on CBS. He also produced the documentary adaptation of the book The Kid Stays in the Picture about the legendary Hollywood producer Robert Evans, which premiered at the 2002 Sundance Film Festival, screened at the 2002 Cannes Film Festival and opened in theaters in July of that year. In 2012, Carter had a minor role in Arbitrage.

== Awards and recognition ==
Accolades during his tenure at Vanity Fair (from 1992-2017) include his having won 14 National Magazine Awards and being named to the Magazine Editors' Hall of Fame.

In 2017, Carter was appointed a Member of the Order of Canada by Governor General David Johnston for "contributions to popular culture and current affairs as a skilled editor and publisher".

Carter received an Emmy Award and a Peabody Award for his film 9/11.

== Personal life ==
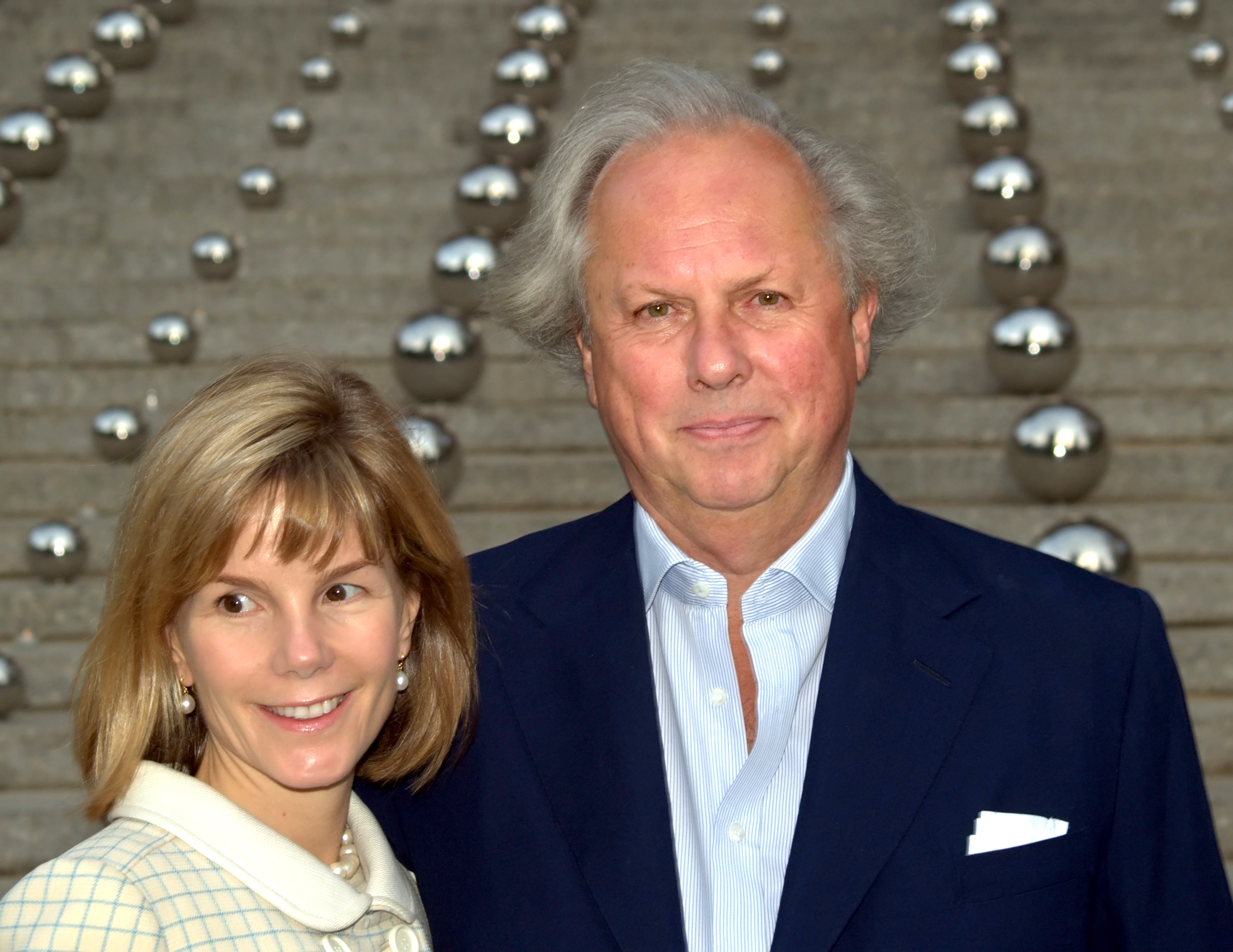
Carter and his wife Anna Scott in New York City in 2010

Carter has married three times. His first wife was French Canadian; they divorced in his 20s, during his time in Canada. He moved to the United States at the age of 28, his second marriage to Cynthia Williamson, a paralegal whose father was a CIA officer, lasted 18 years, producing four children, Ash, Max, Spike, and Bronwyn.

Carter and Williamson separated in July 2000, divorcing amicably and in 2003, he began dating a British woman, Anna Scott, with a background in fashion who is 18 years, his junior. They married at his Roxbury, Estate in 2005; and have one child, a daughter, Isabella Rose, born in 2008. Carter is a dual national of Canada and the US.

In a 2003 interview, Carter described himself as a libertarian.

Carter splits his time between, France, Greenwich Village and Roxbury, Connecticut.

== Bibliography ==
- "Vanity Fair's" Hollywood (2000), ISBN 0-670-89141-X (editor)
- What We've Lost (2004), ISBN 0-374-28892-5
- Tom Ford: Ten Years (2004), ISBN 0-8478-2669-4 (with Tom Ford, Anna Wintour and Bridget Foley)
- Oscar Night: 75 Years of Hollywood Parties (2004), ISBN 1-4000-4248-8 (editor)
- Spy: The Funny Years (2006), ISBN 1-4013-5239-1 (co-author, editor)
- When the Going Was Good: An Editor’s Adventures During the Last Golden Age of Magazines (2025), ISBN 9780593655900

Media offices
Preceded by Tina Brown	Editor of Vanity Fair; 1992–2017	Succeeded by Radhika Jones
