= Thomas L. Phillips Jr. =

American businessman

Thomas L. Phillips, Jr.
- Education: Harvard University (undergraduate); Stanford University (MBA)
- Occupations: media founder, publisher, executive

Tom Phillips (formally Thomas L. Phillips Jr.), is an American businessman who has been involved in media and publishing ventures. Phillips co-founded the humor magazine Spy with editors Graydon Carter and Kurt Andersen, which debuted in October, 1986. He went on to found Starwave, a now-defunct internet company. He led internet ventures for ABC News and ESPN, and worked at Google and Deja News.

== Early life and education ==
Phillips is the son of Thomas L. Phillips, former CEO and chairman of Raytheon. In 1977 he received a bachelor's degree from Harvard University. He received an MBA from Stanford University in 1981.

== Career ==
Following business school, Phillips worked in venture capital. While in this role, Phillips began raising funds for the humor magazine Spy, which debuted in October 1986. The project received $2.8-3.0 million in capital, including $30,000 from his father Thomas L. Phillips. Phillips became a co-founder of Spy along with editors Graydon Carter and Kurt Andersen, and served as its publisher.

Phillips later founded Starwave, a software and website company that Disney bought. Following the acquisition, Phillips served as the president of internet ventures at both ABC News and ESPN.

In 1998, Phillips was hired as the CEO of Deja.com, and subsequently sold the company's core assets to Google and eBay. By 2006, he was serving in a position with Google, as director of print advertising, with responsibilities that included managing Google client advertising in newspapers. He led Google's acquisition of DoubleClick, where he then served as director of search and analytics. In 2009, Phillips left Google to become CEO of Distillery.

== Personal life ==
Phillips has been described as "lanky". In his thirties, while working for Spy, he was described as riding a motorcycle to work.
