= New Schools Network =

British educational charity

- Abbreviation: NSN
- Formation: 6 July 2009; 16 years ago
- Founder: Rachel Wolf
- Type: Educational charity
- Registration no.: 06953650
- Legal status: Charitable company limited by guarantee
- Headquarters: 10 St James's Place, London, United Kingdom
- Location: England
- Chair: David Ross
- Director: Sophie Harrison-Byrne
- Staff: 6 (2022)
- Website: newschoolsnetwork.org

The New Schools Network (NSN) is a United Kingdom-registered charity and former think tank which formerly supported groups setting up free schools within the English state education sector.

== History ==
=== Early years ===
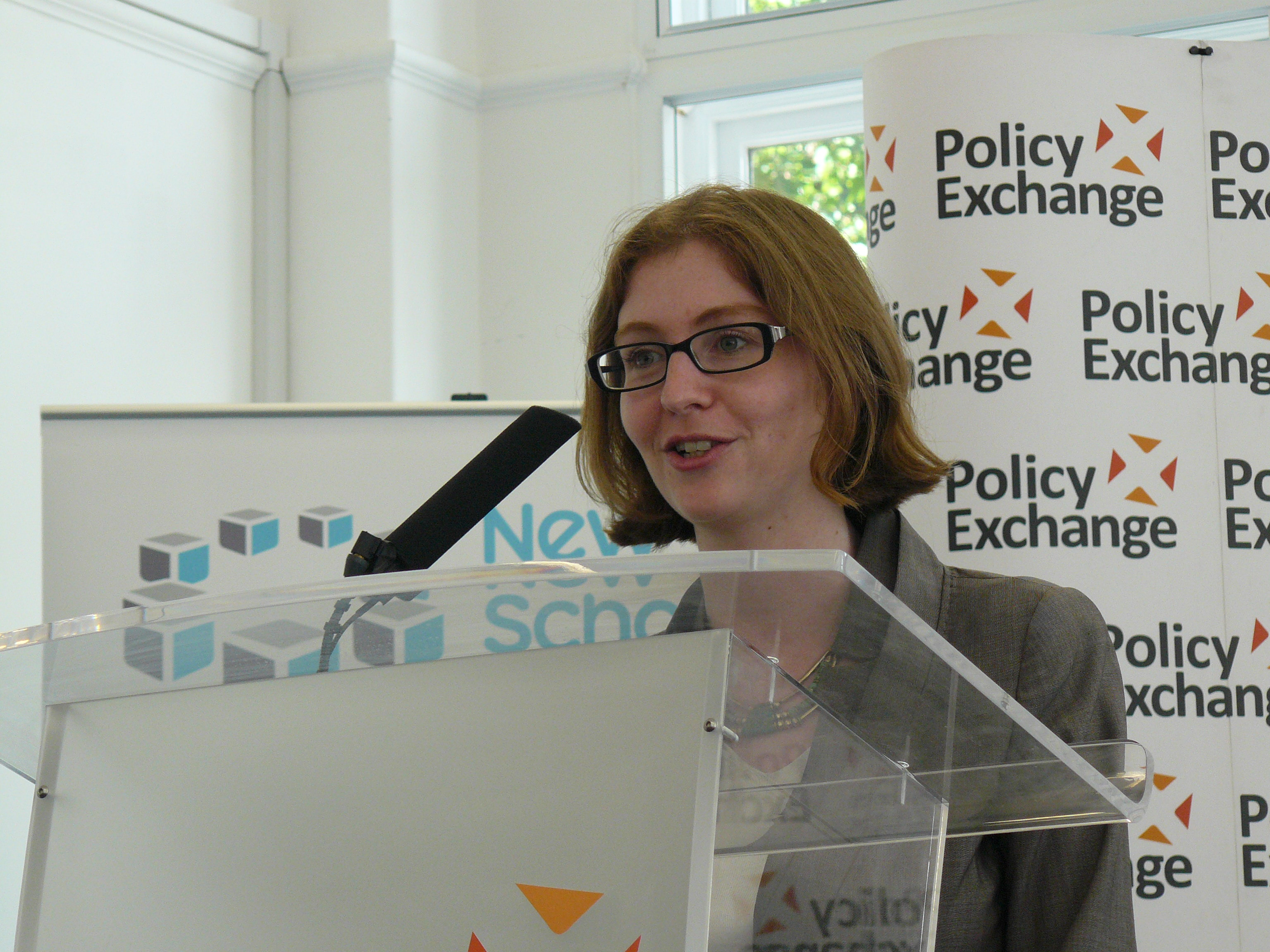
NSN founder Rachel Wolf at a Policy Exchange event in 2012

The New Schools Network was founded in 2009 by its first director Rachel Wolf, a former campaign adviser to Conservative mayor of London Boris Johnson and education adviser to Conservative shadow children's secretary Michael Gove. Wolf started the group after visiting New York City whilst working for Gove and observing the city's charter schools as well as groups such as the Knowledge Is Power Program and the New York City Charter School Center, who advise new schools in the city. In its early years, the network was a think tank for education and gave policy advice. It also offered guidance to people and groups who were establishing new schools, regardless of the character of these schools.

By March 2010, 350 groups had approached the network to find out how to establish a new school. They were planned to be involved in the Conservative Party's first wave of new free schools should it be elected in favour of the incumbent Labour government in May 2010. The Conservatives won the May election and the free schools programme was established. Michael Gove, who had become Secretary of State for Education, held a bid to determine who would be in receipt of a £500,000 government grant which would be used to advise him on the programme and help parents establish new free schools. The network was uncontested in its application and won the bid, though this led to allegations of political impartiality and an investigation. After the bid, the network became central to the programme and was given a say in all free school applications. It later gained responsibility for the programme's delivery and represented free schools.

On 21 June 2010, Gove announced that the network had received over 700 expressions of interest in establishing a free school for the programme's first wave. The first 24 free schools opened in September 2011. The network had worked with 22 of them. The network worked with 61 of the 79 groups applying to open a free school in September 2012. It had since continued to support around 30 prospective schools every year.

In November 2011, the network competed to maintain its government grant and supporting role in the free schools programme in another government bid where it yet again won. It was one of two applicants. Following the victory, it was in receipt of a maximum grant of £400,000 for the 2011 to 2012 financial year and another £650,000 for the 2012 to 2013 financial year. It could also choose to extend the grant to 2014. Another bid for the funding was held in that year, with the network winning again but this time for £3 million. The network's income would become largely dependent on government funding.

From 2013, the network delivered the Academy Ambassadors programme, a non-profit initiative which aimed to recruit board members for academy trusts. A quarter of the companies on the FTSE 100 Index were part of the programme in 2019. Examples include Lloyds and Rolls-Royce.

In 2013, then-current chief operating officer Natalie Evans assumed the role of Director of NSN on the departure of Rachel Wolf. She was succeeded by Nick Timothy in July 2015.

=== Directorship of Toby Young ===
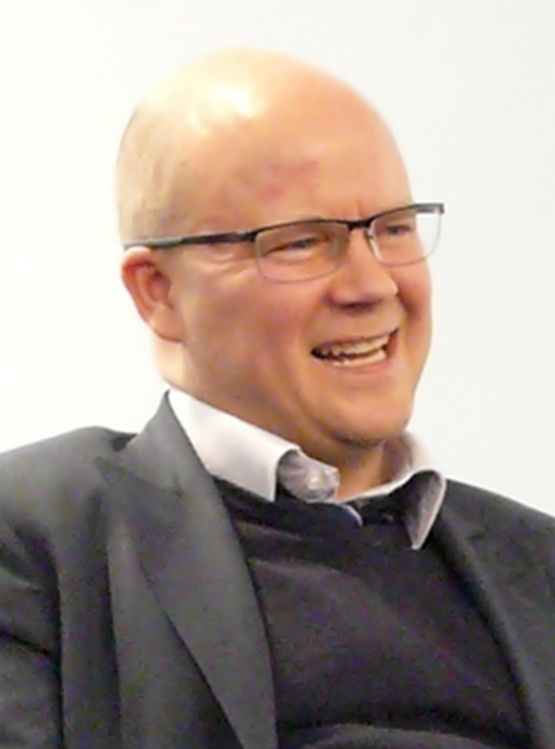
NSN director Toby Young in 2011

Conservative journalist Toby Young was appointed Director of the NSN in October 2016, where he would fill the role from January 2017. His appointment was meant to boost the free schools programme following its shift away from local communities towards multi-academy trusts. Acknowledging his right-wing political views, Young promised to be politically neutral as the director. He had previously been involved with the network when he set up the West London Free School in Hammersmith.

An advocate of the free schools programme since its inception, Director Young called on the government to increase its goal of opening 500 free schools by 2020 to 750 free schools. He also sought to reduce the network's government funding by taking more money from businesses, organisations and donors instead. He welcomed the May government's support for the programme, but was wary with NSN founder Rachel Wolf of its planned creation of new grammar free schools.

Young was appointed to the board of the Department for Education's Office for Students in January 2018. Following his appointment, controversial comments he made in the past resurfaced and he resigned from the board. The National Education Union also called for his resignation as Director of the NSN. By then, the network was nearly entirely funded by the government. However, Young's position as its director put this arrangement at risk, with Universities Minister Sam Gyimah stating that the Department for Education was "looking at options for support around the NSN" during the period where the government was negotiating the network's government grant and subsequent supporting role in the free schools programme. A renewed grant, ranging from £2.8 million to £3.4 million, was to last until 2020 with an optional extension to 2021. Like previous grants, this would be offered in a bid. The network's survival depended on this bid.

The network won the bid and retained its government support albeit with hesitation from the Department for Education. The department had tried to attract other bidders to no avail. Upon the network's successful application, it had considered not paying the grant. It ultimately chose to drop any future grants for the network while also refusing to support its attempted expansion, including in the activity of encouraging non-academy schools to academize. The next day, on 23 March 2018, Young resigned as director due to the "pressure of media attention", though this happened to occur after the government's hesitation to continue funding the NSN as long as Young stayed as its director was publicly disclosed.

=== Later years ===
Following Young's resignation, the NSN fell under the interim directorship of Mark Lehain, the director of the Parents and Teachers for Excellence (PTE) organisation. By this time there were 691 established or soon-to-be established free schools, with the network claiming to have cooperated with more than two thirds of the schools. He defended the free schools programme and gave priority to free school applications coming from areas with both poor pupil performance and a lack of school places caused by oversubscription.

Lehain offered a merger of the NSN and PTE but this was rejected by the NSN's board of trustees. In October 2018, he resigned to prioritise his service at PTE and was succeeded in November at the NSN by Sigrun Olafsdottir, who also served on an interim term until permanent director Luke Tryl took over in March 2019. Tryl would leave the network shortly after in July 2019 to retain his previous role as special adviser to cabinet minister Nicky Morgan. Deputy Director Unity Howard succeeded him. Sophie Harrison-Byrne took over from Howard in September 2021.

In January 2022, the Department for Education held another bid to determine which organisation would have a supportive role in the free schools programme, with a contract of £1,485,000 on the table. The contract, which would come into effect from March 2022, would last for two years with an optional one year extension. The NSN reapplied for the bid as it had done four times previously, however it unexpectedly lost to the Premier Advisory Group led by former NSN employee Charlotte Pearce Cornish. This led to some uncertainty around the network's future. It also pulled its bid for continuing the Academy Ambassadors programme, with the Department for Education bringing the programme into review. The programme subsequently ended on 31 March 2022.

On 6 May 2022, the NSN board of trustees announced that the network was entering closure. In August 2022, the network created the £650,000 NSN Innovation Fund to spend its last funding reserves. Funds granted by the Department for Education are not included in this fund. Academy trusts and free schools which intend to deal with inequality in education will be able to apply for the Innovation Fund from Autumn 2022. The NSN will finally close after the reserves are depleted.

== Criticisms ==
In September 2010, MP Lisa Nandy lodged a formal complaint with the Charity Commission over concerns about the impartiality of the New Schools Network. Rachel Wolf responded that the complaints were politically motivated; saying "the Charity Commission was asked to look into us by activists who are ideologically opposed to free schools and who dislike what we do”. Schools Minister Nick Gibb responded to questions over the tendering of the contract saying "The formal grant agreement between the Department and NSN has not yet been finalised but it will include appropriate clauses on conflicts of interest and clear reporting requirements. There was no contract let for advice to potential free school providers and therefore there were no tenders from other companies". The Charity Commission ruled in November 2010 that the charity had not acted inappropriately and consequently closed the investigation, although it did write to its trustees reminding them of their responsibility to remain politically impartial.

== Free Schools Open in 2011 ==
In September 2011 a total of 24 free schools opened in England.

== See also ==
- Academies Act 2010
- Free school (England)
- Knowledge Is Power Program
- Charter School
