= Spy (magazine) =

American satirical monthly magazine

- Editor: Graydon Carter; Kurt Andersen
- Categories: Humor
- Frequency: Monthly
- Circulation: 165,000
- Publisher: Thomas L. Phillips Jr.
- Founder: Graydon Carter; Kurt Andersen
- Founded: 1986
- First issue: October 1986
- Final issue: March 1998
- Company: Spy Publishing Partners (1986–94); Sussex Publishers (1994–98)
- Country: United States
- Based in: New York City
- Language: English
- ISSN: 0890-1759
- OCLC: 472798137

Spy was a satirical monthly magazine published from 1986 to 1998. Based in New York City, the magazine was founded by Kurt Andersen and E. Graydon Carter, who served as its first editors, and Thomas L. Phillips Jr., its first publisher. Spy specialized in irreverent and satirical pieces targeting the American media and entertainment industries and mocking high society.

== Overview ==
Some of its features attempted to present the darker side of celebrities such as Arnold Schwarzenegger, John F. Kennedy Jr., Steven Seagal, Martha Stewart, and especially the real-estate tycoon Donald Trump and his then-wife Ivana Trump. Pejorative epithets of celebrities, such as "Abe 'I'm Writing As Bad As I Can' Rosenthal", "short-fingered vulgarian Donald Trump", "churlish dwarf billionaire Laurence Tisch", "antique Republican pen-holder Bob Dole", "dynastic misstep La Toya Jackson", "bum-kissing toady Arthur Gelb", "bosomy dirty-book writer Shirley Lord", and "former fat girl Dianne Brill" became a Spy trademark. In the summer of 1992, the publication ran a story on President George H. W. Bush's alleged extramarital affairs. The following year, it ran an article entitled "Clinton's First 100 Lies", detailing what it described as the new president's pattern of duplicitous behavior.

In March 1989, Spy published "The Pickup Artist's Guide to Picking Up Women: A Case-by-Case Look at Movie Director James Toback's Street Technique." It was written by Vincenza Demetz and included accounts from thirteen women—including the author—who accused Toback of sexual misconduct.

Spy was acquired in 1991 by Jean-Christophe Pigozzi and Charles Saatchi. In early 1994, the magazine, which was losing money and couldn't find a buyer, was forced to suspend publication. It was saved by Sussex Publishers Inc., the publishers of Psychology Today and Mother Earth News, resuming publication with the July–August 1994 issue.

The magazine ceased publication in 1998.

== Features ==
Introduced in the May 1987 issue, Private Lives of Public Enemies (renamed Private Lives of Public Figures, then simply Private Lives in 1989) presented fictional representations of public personalities in unflattering situations.

Separated at Birth?, first presented in a feature article in December 1987, was a regular section which would present juxtaposed photos of two different personalities exhibiting visual similarity, to comical effect. The first of each pair was typically a public figure or celebrity, and the second was usually another such figure, but sometimes (usually in the last set) a more absurd subject such as a fictional character, animal, or inanimate object. Separated at Birth? became one of the magazine's most popular features and was spun out into a set of paperback books.

== Legacy ==
In 1990, NBC aired a TV special Spy Magazine Presents How to Be Famous hosted by Jerry Seinfeld and featuring Victoria Jackson and Harry Shearer satirizing American celebrity culture.

In October 2006, Miramax Books published Spy: The Funny Years (ISBN 1-4013-5239-1), a greatest-hits anthology and history of the magazine created and compiled by Carter, Andersen, and one of their original editors, George Kalogerakis.

In January 2015, after the terrorist attack on Charlie Hebdo, Donald Trump made a series of tweets attacking both Spy and Charlie Hebdo, calling Spy a "rag magazine."

In October 2016, Esquire produced a special online version of Spy during the last thirty days of the presidential campaign.

== Books ==
- Separated at Birth? (1988, ISBN 0-385-24744-3): A collection of photographs from "Separated at Birth?"
- Private Lives of Public Figures (Drew Friedman, cartoons from Spy, 1990)
- Spy Notes on McInerney's Bright Lights, Big City/Janowitz's Slaves of New York/Ellis's Less than Zero and All Those Other Hip Urban Novels of the 1980s (1989, ISBN 0-385-24745-1): A CliffsNotes-style look at the literature of the nineteen-eighties
- Separated at Birth? 2: The Saga Continues (1990, ISBN 0-385-41099-9)
- Spy High (1992)
- George Kalogerakis, Kurt Andersen, and Graydon Carter, Spy: The Funny Years (2006, ISBN 1-4013-5239-1)

== See also ==
- List of defunct American periodicals
- Spy Magazine Presents How to Be Famous at IMDb
