= List of awards and nominations received by James Corden =

List of James Corden awards
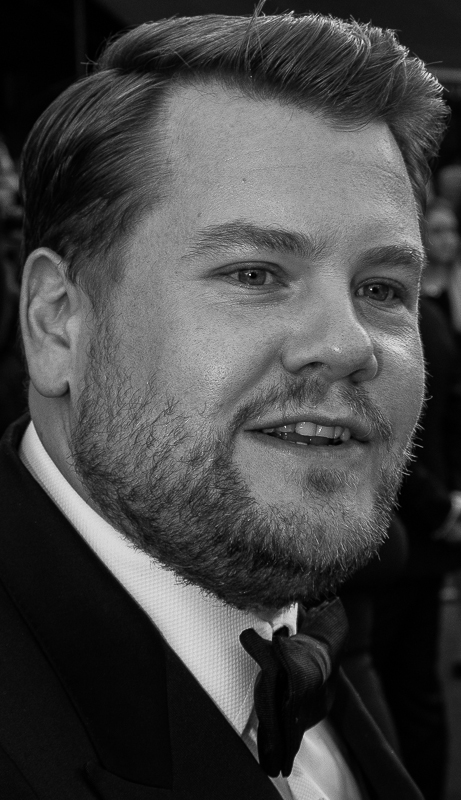
- Corden, 2014 May 18
Award	Wins	Nominations
Emmy Award	12	29
Tony Award	1	1
Overall	29	84

English actor, comedian, singer, writer, producer, and television host James Corden has received many awards and nominations over his career.

== Major Associations ==
=== BAFTA Awards ===
Year	Category	Nominated work	Result	Ref.
2008	Best Comedy Performance	Gavin and Stacey	Won	
2014	Best Male Comedy Performance	The Wrong Mans	Nominated	
2014	Best Writer – Comedy	The Wrong Mans	Nominated	
2015	Best Scripted Comedy	The Wrong Mans	Nominated	
2015	Best Writer – Comedy	The Wrong Mans	Nominated	
2015	Britannia Award for British Artist of the Year	—N/a	Recipient	

=== Golden Globe Awards ===
Year	Category	Nominated work	Result	Ref.
2021	Best Actor – Motion Picture Musical or Comedy	The Prom	Nominated	

=== Primetime Emmy Awards ===
Year	Category	Nominated work	Result	Ref.
2016	Outstanding Variety Talk Series	The Late Late Show with James Corden	Nominated	
2016	Outstanding Interactive Program	The Late Late Show with James Corden	Won	
2016	Outstanding Variety Special	The Late Late Show Carpool Karaoke Primetime Special	Won	
2017	Outstanding Variety Talk Series	The Late Late Show with James Corden	Nominated	
2017	Outstanding Interactive Program	The Late Late Show with James Corden	Nominated	
2017	Outstanding Variety Special	Carpool Karaoke Primetime Special 2017	Won	
2017	Outstanding Special Class Program	70th Tony Awards	Won	
2017	Outstanding Writing for a Variety Special	70th Tony Awards	Nominated	
2018	Outstanding Variety Talk Series	The Late Late Show with James Corden	Nominated	
2018	Outstanding Interactive Program	The Late Late Show with James Corden	Nominated	
2018	Outstanding Variety Special (Pre-Recorded)	Carpool Karaoke Primetime Special 2018	Nominated	
2018	Outstanding Variety Special (Live)	60th Annual Grammy Awards	Nominated	
2018	Outstanding Short Form Variety Series	Carpool Karaoke: The Series	Won	
2018	Outstanding Short Form Comedy or Drama Series	James Corden's Next James Corden	Won	
2018	Outstanding Actor in a Short Form Comedy or Drama Series	James Corden's Next James Corden	Won	
2019	Outstanding Variety Talk Series	The Late Late Show with James Corden	Nominated	
2019	Outstanding Interactive Program	The Late Late Show with James Corden	Nominated	
2019	Outstanding Variety Special (Pre-Recorded)	Carpool Karaoke: When Corden Met McCartney Live From Liverpool	Won	
2019	Outstanding Writing for a Variety Special	Carpool Karaoke: When Corden Met McCartney Live From Liverpool	Nominated	
2019	Outstanding Interactive Program	Carpool Karaoke Primetime Special 2019	Nominated	
2019	Outstanding Short Form Variety Series	Carpool Karaoke: The Series	Won	
2019	Outstanding Host for a Reality or Competition Programme	The World's Best	Nominated	
2020	Outstanding Variety Special (Live)	73rd Tony Awards	Nominated	
2020	Outstanding Short Form Variety Series	Carpool Karaoke: The Series	Won	
2021	Outstanding Variety Special (Pre-Recorded)	Friends: The Reunion	Nominated	
2021	Outstanding Short Form Comedy, Drama or Variety Series	Carpool Karaoke: The Series	Won	
2022	Outstanding Short Form Comedy, Drama or Variety Series	Carpool Karaoke: The Series	Won	
2023	Outstanding Short Form Comedy, Drama or Variety Series	Carpool Karaoke: The Series	Nominated	
2024	Outstanding Short Form Comedy, Drama or Variety Series	Carpool Karaoke: The Series	Nominated	

=== Tony Awards ===
Year	Category	Nominated work	Result	Ref.
2012	Best Actor in a Play	One Man, Two Guvnors	Won	

== Others (complete list) ==
Year	Award	Category	Work	Result
2001	Royal Television Society	Network Newcomer – On-Screen	Fat Friends	Nominated
2007	Writers' Guild of Great Britain	Television Comedy/Light Entertainment	Gavin & Stacey	Nominated
2007	British Comedy Awards	Best Male Comedy Newcomer	Gavin & Stacey	Won
2008	Writers' Guild of Great Britain	Television Comedy/Light Entertainment	Gavin & Stacey	Won
2008	British Comedy Awards	Best Television Comedy Actor	Gavin & Stacey	Nominated
2008	Broadcasting Press Guild	Best Comedy/Entertainment	Gavin & Stacey	Won
2009	Broadcasting Press Guild	Best Comedy/Entertainment	Gavin & Stacey	Nominated
2010	Television and Radio Industries Club	TV Entertainment Programme	Gavin & Stacey	Nominated
2012	Outer Critics Circle Award	Outstanding Actor in a Play	One Man, Two Guvnors	Nominated
2012	Drama Desk Award	Outstanding Actor in a Play	One Man, Two Guvnors	Won
2012	Laurence Olivier Award	Best Actor	One Man, Two Guvnors	Nominated
2012	Whatsonstage.com Awards	Best Actor in a Play	One Man, Two Guvnors	Won
2013	Satellite Award	Best Actor – Television Series Musical or Comedy	The Wrong Mans	Nominated
2014	Washington D.C. Area Film Critics Association Award	Best Ensemble	Into the Woods	Nominated
2014	Phoenix Film Critics Society Award	Best Cast	Into the Woods	Nominated
2014	Detroit Film Critics Society Award	Best Ensemble	Into the Woods	Nominated
2015	Critics' Choice Movie Award	Best Acting Ensemble	Into the Woods	Nominated
2015	Satellite Award	Best Cast – Motion Picture	Into the Woods	Won
2015	Critics' Choice Television Award	Best Talk Show	The Late Late Show with James Corden	Nominated
2016	People's Choice Awards	Favorite Late Night Talk Show Host	The Late Late Show with James Corden	Nominated
2016	Critics' Choice Television Award	Best Talk Show	The Late Late Show with James Corden	Nominated
2016	Teen Choice Awards	Choice Comedian	The Late Late Show with James Corden	Nominated
2016	Critics' Choice Television Award	Best Talk Show	The Late Late Show with James Corden	Won
2017	People's Choice Awards	Favorite Late Night Talk Show Host	The Late Late Show with James Corden	Nominated
2017	People's Choice Awards	Favorite Comedic Collaboration	The Late Late Show with James Corden	Nominated
2017	National Television Awards	Most Popular TV Presenter	A League of Their Own	Nominated
2017	Producers Guild of America Award	Outstanding Producer of Live Entertainment & Talk Television	The Late Late Show with James Corden	Nominated
2017	Teen Choice Awards	Choice TV Personality	The Late Late Show with James Corden	Nominated
2018	Critics' Choice Television Award	Best Talk Show	The Late Late Show with James Corden	Nominated
2018	Producers Guild of America Award	Outstanding Short-Form Program	Carpool Karaoke: The Series	Won
2018	Teen Choice Awards	Choice Fantasy Movie Actor	Peter Rabbit	Nominated
2018	Teen Choice Awards	Choice Comedian	The Late Late Show with James Corden	Nominated
2018	People's Choice Awards	The Nighttime Talk Show of 2018	The Late Late Show with James Corden	Nominated
2019	Producers Guild of America Award	Outstanding Short-Form Program	Carpool Karaoke: The Series	Nominated
2019	Nickelodeon Kids' Choice Awards	Favorite Male Voice from an Animated Movie	Peter Rabbit	Nominated
2019	Critics' Choice Real TV Awards	Best Late-Night Talk Show	The Late Late Show with James Corden	Won
2019	Critics' Choice Real TV Awards	Best Show Host	The Late Late Show with James Corden	Won
2019	Critics' Choice Real TV Awards	Best Short-Form Series	Carpool Karaoke: The Series	Won
2019	Teen Choice Awards	Choice Comedian	The Late Late Show with James Corden	Nominated
2019	People's Choice Awards	The Nighttime Talk Show of 2019	The Late Late Show with James Corden	Nominated
2020	Critics' Choice Television Award	Best Talk Show	The Late Late Show with James Corden	Won
2020	Writers Guild of America Award	Comedy/Variety – Talk Series	The Late Late Show with James Corden	Nominated
2020	Writers Guild of America Award	Comedy/Variety – Specials	Carpool Karaoke Primetime Special 2019	Nominated
2020	Golden Raspberry Awards	Worst Supporting Actor	Cats	Won
2020	Critics' Choice Real TV Awards	Best Short Form Series	Carpool Karaoke: The Series	Won
2020	People's Choice Awards	The Nighttime Talk Show of 2020	The Late Late Show with James Corden	Nominated
2021	People's Choice Awards	The Nighttime Talk Show of 2021	The Late Late Show with James Corden	Nominated
2022	People's Choice Awards	The Nighttime Talk Show of 2022	The Late Late Show with James Corden	Nominated
