= West London Free School =

Location
- 241 King Street; Hammersmith, London, W6 9LP; England; 51.4955°N 0.231°W

Information
- Type: Free school
- Motto: Sapere Aude
- Established: 2011
- Founders: Toby Young, Cosmo Lush, Justin Tooth, Suzie and Ed Hobart, Kathryn Cooper, Chris Wieszczycki, Tim Waters, Simon Hugill, Mustafa Erdem, Charlie Ben-Nathan, Stefan Bojanowski
- Department for Education URN: 136750 Tables
- Ofsted: Reports
- Co-Headteachers: Ben McLaughlin and Robert Peal
- Gender: Coeducational
- Age: 11 to 18
- Enrolment: 915
- Houses: 4
- Colour: Navy blue
- Website: http://www.wlfs.org/

The West London Free School is an English free school for girls and boys aged 11 to 18. It was co-founded by Toby Young and opened in 2011.

It is located in Hammersmith in west London and was the first free school of its type in England to sign a Funding Agreement with the Secretary of State for Education.

The West London Free School offers children a classical liberal education and is a music specialist school, with more than half the pupils learning a musical instrument. Its production of Sweeney Todd in the summer of 2015 enjoyed a short, sell-out run at the Bush Theatre.

In 2025 the school was named the Comprehensive Secondary School of the Year in London by The Times after climbing 41 places in national league tables to 75th.

== History ==
The school was formally opened by Mayor of London Boris Johnson in September 2011 and currently has 600 pupils enrolled. It received over 1,000 applicants for its last 120 places in 2013, making it one of the most oversubscribed taxpayer-funded schools in England in 2013.

The building used had originally been the Elizabeth Burgwin School that had opened in 1964.

The school's first headteacher was Thomas Packer, who served in post from September 2011 to December 2012, before becoming education director of the charitable trust that set up the school. Sam Naismith, a former England hockey coach, was then Headteacher from January 2013 until May 2014. Dame Sally Coates, ex-principal of Burlington Danes Academy, looked after the school, alongside David Stanton, while a permanent head was chosen. Hywel Jones was appointed as headteacher from September 2014 to December 2017. Hywel Jones was formerly an assistant headteacher at St. Mary's Catholic School in Bishop’s Stortford. In January 2018, Clare Wagner became the school's headteacher until April 2021. In April 2021, Ben McLaughlin and Robert Peal became joint headteachers

The school was inspected by Ofsted in 2013 and 2017 and judged to be good.

In 2013 it was reported that "the school's traditional, academic focus is popular with parents", despite the issues with leadership turnover and with school buildings. All pupils studied Latin until age 14, and were entered for eight academic GCSEs.

In 2013 the West London Free School Primary was opened, starting with two Reception classes of 30 pupils each. In 2014, the West London Free School Academy Trust opened the Earls Court Free School Primary, which is currently co-located with the West London Free School Primary, but will move to Earls Court in 2020. In 2016, the Trust opened the Kensington Primary Academy.

The secondary school is based at Palingswick House on King Street in Hammersmith. In May 2014 the Trust purchased an office block on nearby Bridge Avenue for £9.25 million. This building is now Franklin House, the school's sixth form. Initially, the secondary school was based in Cambridge Grove, Hammersmith, before moving to its current location, with the West London Free School Primary and Earls Court Primary Free School also sharing the Cambridge Grove site.

== GCSE Results ==
The school posted its first set of GCSE results in August, 2016. Seventy-seven per cent of the pupils obtained five GCSEs marked A* to C, including English and Mathematics. Thirty-eight per cent of all the GCSEs taken were marked A* or A, with 63% marked A* to B. In Mathematics, 85% of pupils achieved A* to C, with 37% getting A* or A. In English Literature, 79% of pupils achieved A* to C, with 44% getting A* or A. One hundred per cent of pupils who took all three sciences achieved A* to C, with 75% getting an average grade of A* or A. One hundred per cent of pupils who took Music achieved A* to C, with 57% getting A* or A. One hundred per cent of pupils who took Art achieved A* to C, with 33% getting A* or A. Ninety-five per cent of pupils who took RE achieved A* to C, with 67% getting A* or A. The Best Eight score for the cohort is 5.9.

== Criticism ==
In addition to criticism of the free school concept generally, the West London Free School was criticised in The Guardian for planning to make its permanent site Palingswick House in Hammersmith; which had served as a boarding school until around 1948, when it became a residential home for diabetic children, and was later occupied by a number of community groups. Hammersmith MP Andy Slaughter added his voice to the criticism, stating that the school was "ousting 22 charities and a school for severely disabled children in its rush to open".

In response, Toby Young pointed out that Palingswick House was listed for disposal by Hammersmith and Fulham Borough Council long before the West London Free School came into existence and, had the school not subsequently bought it, it would likely have been sold off to a property developer and possibly demolished.

In February 2011, Peter Winter, head of the neighbouring independent Latymer Upper School, objected to the proposed location of the West London Free School at Palingswick House. He cited concerns about pupil safety, traffic congestion and pressure on local infrastructure arising from an additional 600 pupils. While stating that he did not oppose the principle of a new secondary school, he argued that the site was unsuitable. As head of an adjacent fee-paying school, his objections also attracted attention because of the potential appearance of a conflict of interest. West London Free School founder Toby Young responded that the school would commission a transport assessment, adopt a “no drop-off” policy and phase its growth gradually.

Responding to a claim that the school was unrepresentative of the local community, Young said that approximately 25 per cent of the pupils were on free school meals.
