= How to Lose Friends & Alienate People (film) =

- UK theatrical release poster
- Directed by: Robert Weide
- Screenplay by: Peter Straughan
- Based on: How to Lose Friends & Alienate People by Toby Young
- Produced by: Stephen Woolley; Elizabeth Karlsen
- Starring: Simon Pegg; Kirsten Dunst; Danny Huston; Gillian Anderson; Megan Fox; Max Minghella; Jeff Bridges
- Cinematography: Oliver Stapleton
- Edited by: David Freeman
- Music by: David Arnold
- Production companies: Alienate Limited; Number 9 Films; Audley Films LLP; Intandem Films PLC; Film4; UK Film Council; LipSync Post; Aramid Entertainment Fund; Bord Scannán na hÉireann
- Distributed by: Paramount Pictures (United Kingdom and Australia); MGM Distribution Co. (United States); Intandem Films PLC (international)
- Release dates: 3 October 2008 (United Kingdom and United States)
- Running time: 110 minutes
- Countries: United Kingdom; Cayman Islands; Ireland; United States
- Language: English
- Budget: $28 million
- Box office: $19.2 million

How to Lose Friends & Alienate People is a 2008 comedy film based upon Toby Young's 2001 memoir of the same name. The film follows a similar storyline, about his five-year struggle to make it in the United States after employment at Sharps Magazine. The names of the magazine and people Young came into contact with during the time were changed for the film adaptation. The film version (adapted by Peter Straughan) is a highly fictionalized account, and differs greatly from the work upon which it was built.

Directed by Robert Weide, it stars Simon Pegg, Kirsten Dunst, Danny Huston, Gillian Anderson, Megan Fox and Jeff Bridges, alongside Max Minghella and Margo Stilley. How to Lose Friends & Alienate People was released in the United Kingdom by Paramount Pictures and in the United States by Metro-Goldwyn-Mayer Pictures on 3 October 2008.

== Plot ==
Sidney Young, an aspiring British journalist who runs a failing polemical magazine, attempts to infiltrate a party organized by Clayton Harding, the CEO of Sharps, one of the most prestigious magazines in the world. In doing so, he momentarily gains Clayton's sympathy, as the latter began his own career through polemics.

Sidney is offered a job at Sharps, and moves to New York City, but he quickly earns the scorn of his colleagues, including Alison Olsen and the manager Lawrence Maddox, as a result of his rudeness, vulgarity, and general unattractiveness. Interviews with famous performers must be arranged by publicist Eleanor Johnson, who imposes restrictions on published content.

On one occasion, Sidney accidentally kills the dog of rising actress Sophie Maes, to whom he is intensely attracted. Alison, although despising him, agrees to help conceal the mistake. Sidney gains Alison's respect by explaining his disapproval of Eleanor's practices, and Alison reveals that she also despises her job, and has been working sporadically on a novel for years, which she hopes to publish. At a bar Sidney meets a girl and brings her home, and she turns out to be transgender. He later brings her to strip for Lawrence at work (to get incriminating photos).

At a party, Sidney discovers that Alison was having an affair with Lawrence, but has chosen to end it. He is approached by Sophie, who has become drunk, but forfeits the chance to sleep with her, upon discovering that Alison is also drunk and needs to be driven. At his apartment, Alison meets Sidney's father, who turns out to be a well known philosophy professor, and a member of the nobility.

Later, Sidney attempts to ask Alison on a date, but learns that she is reuniting with Lawrence, who has just divorced his wife, Clayton's daughter. Being heavily depressed, Sidney compromises his journalistic principles and begs to work with Eleanor. Not only does Eleanor agree, but Lawrence and Alison are pressured to leave the magazine by Clayton, as a result of Lawrence's divorce, leading to Sidney's promotion.

Sidney works hard, writing to please others rather than criticize, and earns several more promotions within a short time, as well as gaining access to the highest celebrities and most exclusive social gatherings. On the night before a prestigious film-awards ceremony, Sidney attends an informal party led by Sophie, and is pressured into surrendering his gold ring, which was a gift from his late mother.

He regains his contempt for high society, and the next evening, as Sophie is approaching the stage to claim her award, he seizes her to take back the ring, cursing, and confessing that he killed her dog. In response, Sophie attacks Sidney, attracting negative attention on camera; nonetheless, Sidney, no longer with Sharps, rushes back to Alison in NYC, who by now has separated with Lawrence, and they begin a relationship.

== Cast ==
- Simon Pegg as Sidney Young, a British journalist. He is based on Toby Young as he is portrayed in the memoir.
- Megan Fox as Sophie Maes, a budding starlet and the object of Young's lust.
- Kirsten Dunst as Alison Olsen, Young's colleague and eventual love interest.
- Danny Huston as Lawrence Maddox, Young's direct boss.
- Gillian Anderson as Eleanor Johnson, the publicist pulling all the strings. Eleanor is loosely based on Nadine Johnson, a high powered publicist in New York City.
- Jeff Bridges as Clayton Harding, Young's magazine editor who is loosely based on Graydon Carter, the editor of Vanity Fair.
- Bill Paterson as Richard Young, Baron Young, Sidney's father; loosely based on Toby Young's father, Michael Young, Baron Young of Dartington
- Max Minghella as Vincent Lepak, a young up-and-coming director whom Sidney despises
- Miriam Margolyes as Mrs Kowalski, Young's landlady
- Margo Stilley as Ingrid, Young's colleague
- Jefferson Mays as Bill Nathanson
- Diana Kent as Rachel Petkoff
- Nathalie Cox as Woman in Bar
- Charlotte Devaney as Bobbie, a transgender woman
- Brian Austin Green as a party guest
- Thandiwe Newton as herself
- Chris O'Dowd as a co-worker
- James Corden as a co-worker
- Katherine Parkinson as PR woman

Several other high-profile celebrities appear via archive footage, including Ricky Gervais, Kate Winslet and Daniel Craig.

== Production ==
How to Lose Friends & Alienate People is an independent film, and was described as "a testosterone-laced Devil Wears Prada." The film was produced by Number 9 Films.

In 2006, Simon Pegg was announced as the lead, Kirsten Dunst was revealed to appear in the film in late April 2007, and in May 2007, Jeff Bridges and Gillian Anderson were added. Toby Young, who wrote the memoir, was banned from the set at the request of Kirsten Dunst after she overheard him providing feedback to a producer on her performance in a particular scene. He does appear in the film though, with a brief cameo in the background of a party scene.

== Reception ==
=== Box office ===
How to Lose Friends & Alienate People opened as one of the United Kingdom's number one films at the box office, taking the equivalent of US$7,055,425 during its run there. It took US$2,927,210 in Russia and US$1,963,356 in Australia. In the United States and Canada, the film grossed just US$2,778,242.

The total worldwide gross was about US$19 million, 40% less than the production budget.

=== Critical response ===
The film received predominantly negative reviews. According to the review aggregator website Rotten Tomatoes, 36% of critics have given the film a positive review based on 113 reviews, with an average rating of 4.99/10. The site's critics consensus reads, "A decent performance from Pegg in a disappointing film. Neither sharp nor satirical, Weide's adaptation relies too heavily on slapstick, and misses the point of the source material in the process." At Metacritic, the film has a weighted average score of 35 out of 100 based on 25 critics, indicating "generally unfavorable" reviews. Audiences polled by CinemaScore gave the film an average grade of "C+" on an A+ to F scale.

The Spectator called the film "fun," but noted that it "yaps around the ankles of its subject without ever moving in for a decent-sized, satisfying bite." On the other hand, The Sunday Times said the film "has more laughs than any British comedy to appear over the past decade."

In the United States, Roger Ebert of the Chicago Sun-Times gave it 3½ out of 4 stars, calling it "possibly the best movie that could be made about Toby Young that isn't rated NC-17."
