= Thomas L. Phillips =

American business executive (1923/1924–2019)

- Born: Athanasius Leonidas Philippides; 1923/1924; Istanbul, Turkey
- Education: Virginia Tech (B.S., M.S.)
- Occupations: late CEO, Chairman of Raytheon

Thomas L. Phillips (1923/1924–2019) was a U.S. engineer and long-serving senior executive at Raytheon Corporation. Phillips began his career at Raytheon in 1948, rising through its ranks to become its CEO in 1968 and board chairman in 1975, holding the CEO position until his retirement in 1991 and remaining on its board until 2000. During his period of leadership, Raytheon was known for its acquisitions outside of the defense sector. The firm's acquisitions under Phillips included commercial electronics, consumer appliances (also known as white goods, and other assets involving advanced engineering. Through his patient management, Raytheon's sales would reach $1 billion by 1967.

In the late 1960s, despite Raytheon's success and citing a period of personal emptiness, Phillips made a commitment to the Christian faith, which would, per the testimony of other Raytheon senior executives, influence his management and leadership philosophy. It also led to his friendship and influence upon Watergate co-conspirator Charles Colson.

== Early life and education ==
With regard to Phillips' birth and early life, "[l]ittle is known", as he "deflected questions about his origins", but he is reported to have been born Athanasius Leonidas Philippides in Istanbul, Turkey, to Greek parents. He himself listed 1924 as his birth year, but The Wall Street Journal, in reporting his death, noted that an official "record in Canada... said he was born in 1923". The Canadian documents indicate that Phillips' father died "within a few years" of his birth, and that his mother and sister left Turkey for Greece, eventually immigrating to Canada in 1929. After a further move to Boston in 1936, his mother re-married to a Greek-American man, who became Phillips' stepfather.

Phillips was admitted to and graduated from the Boston Latin School. He then enrolled at Northeastern University, where he played football and basketball. His college education was interrupted by the draft into the U.S. Army in 1943, and he was transferred to the Virginia Polytechnic Institute and State University for advanced technical training with eventual expectation of duty assignment to the Pacific theater. But the surrender of Japan in August 1945 enabled him to return to Virginia Tech to complete two electrical engineering degrees, a bachelor’s and a master’s, respectively, in 1947 and 1948.

== Career ==
Phillips was hired by the military contractor Raytheon as an engineer in 1948. Early in his employment he reached the level of project manager, a role he played for eight years, including for two important weapons systems, the air-to-air Sparrow and the surface-to-air Hawk missile.

Phillips worked his way up to managerial positions, to become the president of the company in 1964; He became its CEO in 1968, and its board chairman in 1975. Under his direction Raytheon was diversified away from its contemporary role, purely in defense contracting, into the production of products for consumer markets, a change of direction made through acquisitions. The aim was "to insulate [Raytheon] from the unpredictability of military spending".

Acquisitions under Phillips included engineering manufacturing assets (in its acquiring United Engineers and Constructors and Cedar Rapids Corp.), consumer white goods (e.g., in its acquiring Amana and Speed Queen), as well other categories of assets. The period has also been characterized as exhibiting patient stewardship of acquired assets—he is described as having carried on despite an asset "not [being] immediately successful". Writing in The New York Times obituary for Phillips, Daniel E. Slotnik describes one example, regarding Raytheon's purchase and management of Beech Aircraft:

Raytheon bought Beech Aircraft [in 1980] for a reported $790 million, just before the general aviation market crashed. Rather than walk away, ...Phillips poured hundreds of millions of dollars into Beech, developing a cutting-edge corporate aircraft called the Starship and positioning Raytheon to benefit when the airplane market rebounded in 1988.

Phillips is credited with the leadership that would, through acquisitions and diversification, allow Raytheon to surpass $1 billion in sales, which they had done by 1967. By 1990, the bellwether of non-governmental sales reached approximately $3.6 billion of Raytheon's $9 billion in revenue, and 25% of its >$930 million in operating profit. Phillips would hold executive positions with Raytheon until his retirement in 1991, and would remain on its board until 2000.

=== Board positions ===
Phillips served on several boards, including Digital Equipment Corporation, John Hancock Mutual Life Insurance Company, Knight-Ridder Inc., and State Street Research & Management.

== Awards and recognition ==
Phillips was recognized by several honorary degrees, including from Babson, Boston, Gordon, and Stonehill Colleges, from the University of Massachusetts at Amherst and Lowell, and from Northeastern and Suffolk Universities.

== Personal life ==
=== Christian faith ===
In the midst of his business successes in the late 1960s, Phillips reported having experienced a period of profound personal emptiness, stating to one interviewer, later, that in that period "something was missing". Writing about Phillips in August 1976, Nathaniel C. Nash of The New York Times reported that, ca. 1969,

Phillips went to a Billy Graham crusade in New York and came out a changed man, a believer in evangelical Christianity. That change was to have a profound effect on former White House staffer Charles Colson...

Phillips' commitment to a Christian faith, per the testimony of other, later Raytheon senior executives, influenced his management and leadership styles, and resulted in his high-profile friendship with, and his influence upon, Watergate co-conspirator Charles Colson, providing Colson support in the aftermath of "his personal Watergate disaster".

=== Charitable affiliations and activities ===
With regard to charitable and public service organisations, Phillips served on the board of the Salvation Army, on the executive committee of United Way of Eastern New England, on the board of overseers of the Boston Museum of Science, and as member of the corporation of the Joslin Diabetes Center.

=== Death and legacy ===
Phillips was pre-deceased by his wife of 73 years, Gertrude, who died in 2017. Phillips died on January 9, 2019, at his home in Weston, Massachusetts. He was survived by four children—three daughters and one son (including a son, Tom, and a daughter, Debbie Phillips)—as well as by 11 grandchildren and 12 great-grandchildren.

The Raytheon CEO and Chairman at the time of his passing, Thomas A. Kennedy, stated that "for all his technical and financial achievements, Tom will be best known at Raytheon for his warm and engaging business leadership."
