= How to Lose Friends & Alienate People (memoir) =

2001 memoir by Toby Young

- First edition
- Author: Toby Young
- Publisher: Little, Brown & Co
- Publication date: 2001
- ISBN: 9780306811883

How to Lose Friends & Alienate People is a 2001 memoir by Toby Young about his failed five-year effort to make it in the United States as a contributing editor at Condé Nast Publications' Vanity Fair magazine. The book alternates Young's foibles with his ruminations about the differences in culture and society between the United States and England, and specifically between New York City and London.

The book depicts Young's relationship with various British and American journalists, including Julie Burchill, Anthony Haden-Guest, Tina Brown and Harold Evans (who at one point threatens to sue him) and Vanity Fair's own Graydon Carter. Young also describes awkward run-ins with American celebrities including Nathan Lane, Mel Gibson and Diana Ross. Throughout the book, Young describes being tormented by his friend "Alex de Silva" (speculated to be Sacha Gervasi), a former colleague of Young's who manages to succeed in America in every way that Young does not.

The title of Young's book is a parody of the title of Dale Carnegie's 1937 perennial bestseller, How to Win Friends and Influence People; a parody by Irving Tressler titled How to Lose Friends and Alienate People was also published that same year. Young's book does not reference either Carnegie's or Tressler's works.

== Reception ==
Andrew Anthony, writing in The Observer in 2001, wrote that book "works best as a showcase for a succession of well-polished anecdotes highlighting the author's professional and sexual incompetence." concluding that "it's the alcohol-soaked hack, desperate to mix with the beautiful people, who will stay in the memory. The dual job of the journalist is supposedly to press his nose up against the glass and hold a mirror up to the world. Young makes most sense when he's holding up a glass and pressing his nose against a mirror."

== Adaptations ==
The book was adapted into a one-man play that played on London's West End for several months each in 2003 and 2004. Young was initially played by Jack Davenport, then by Young himself.

A feature-length film adaptation, also titled How to Lose Friends & Alienate People, was released in October 2008. It is directed by Robert B. Weide and stars Simon Pegg, Kirsten Dunst, and Megan Fox. The film is loosely based on the book, turning the plot into more of a straightforward romantic comedy.

== Sequel ==
Young wrote a 2006 sequel, The Sound of No Hands Clapping, which chronicles his failure as a Hollywood screenwriter in the years after he left New York.
