= Toby Young =

British journalist (born 1963)

The Right Honourable The Lord Young of Acton
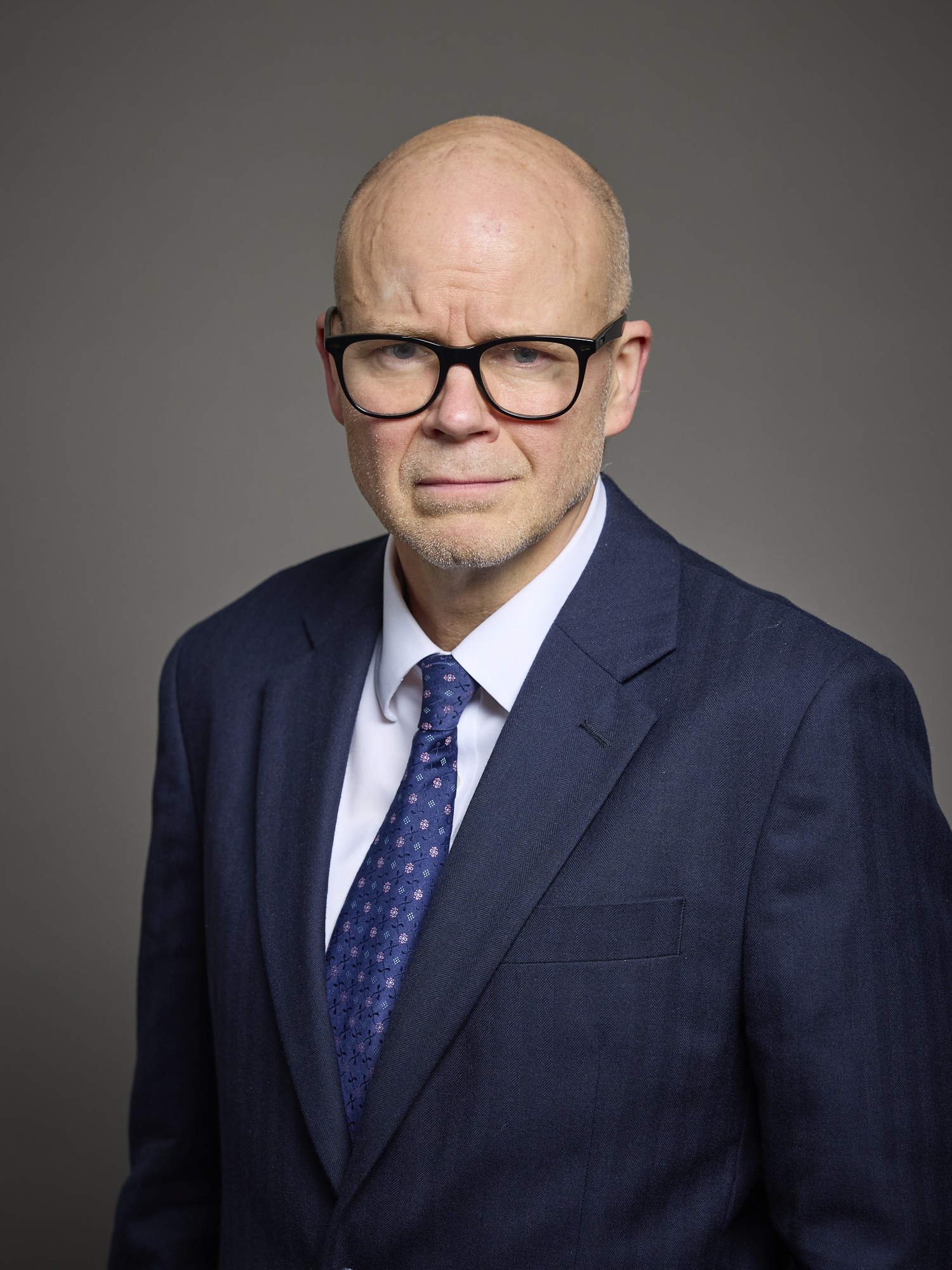
- Official portrait, 2025

Director of the Free Speech Union
- Incumbent
- Assumed office 24 February 2020

Non-Executive Member of the Board of the Office for Students
- In office 2 January 2018 – 9 January 2018

Member of the House of Lords
- Lord Temporal
- Life peerage 21 January 2025

Personal details
- Born: Toby Daniel Moorsom Young; 17 October 1963 (age 63) Buckinghamshire, England
- Party: Conservative
- Spouse: Caroline Bondy (m. 2001)
- Children: 4
- Parent: The Baron Young of Dartington (father)
- Education: Brasenose College, Oxford; Harvard University; Trinity College, Cambridge (did not graduate)
- Occupation: Journalist

Toby Daniel Moorsom Young, Baron Young of Acton (born 17 October 1963), is a British social commentator and Conservative life peer. He is the founder and director of the Free Speech Union, an associate editor of The Spectator, creator of The Daily Sceptic blog and a former associate editor at Quillette.

A graduate of the University of Oxford, Young briefly worked for The Times, before co-founding the London magazine Modern Review in 1991. He edited it until financial difficulties led to its demise in 1995. His 2001 memoir, How to Lose Friends & Alienate People, details his subsequent employment at Vanity Fair. He then went on to write for The Sun on Sunday, the Daily Mail, The Daily Telegraph, and The Spectator. He also served as a judge in series five and six of the television show Top Chef. A proponent of free schools, Young co-founded the West London Free School and served as director of the New Schools Network.

In 2015 Young wrote an article in advocacy of genetically engineered intelligence, which he described as "progressive eugenics". In early January 2018, he was briefly a non-executive director on the board of the Office for Students, an appointment from which he resigned within a few days after Twitter posts described by some as "misogynistic and homophobic" were uncovered. In 2020, press regulator Independent Press Standards Organisation (IPSO) found Young to have promoted misinformation about the COVID-19 pandemic in a Daily Telegraph column.

== Early life ==
Born in Buckinghamshire, Young was brought up in Highgate, North London, and in South Devon. His mother Sasha (1931–1993), daughter of Raisley Stewart Moorsom, a descendant of Admiral Sir Robert Moorsom, who fought at the Battle of Trafalgar, was a BBC Radio producer, artist and writer, and his father was Michael Young (later Lord Young of Dartington), a Labour life peer and sociologist who popularized the word meritocracy. Although entitled to use the style The Hon. Toby Young, he did not.

Young attended Creighton School (now Fortismere School), Muswell Hill and King Edward VI Community College, Totnes. Young later wrote that he was not popular at school: "My only friend was a black boy called Remi, who explained that the reason he'd taken a shine to me was because he knew what it was like to be a 'nigger'." He left school at 16, having failed all but one of his O Levels (the pass was a C in English Literature). He then retook his O Levels and went to the Sixth Form of William Ellis School, Highgate, leaving with two Bs and a C at A Level. Having applied to study philosophy, politics and economics (PPE) at Oxford University, he had been given a conditional offer of three Bs plus an O Level pass in a foreign language from Brasenose College, under an Inner London Education Authority scheme to provide university access to comprehensive pupils. Despite failing to meet that offer, he was awarded a place to study at the college. Young said he was sent an acceptance letter by mistake, as well as a letter of rejection from the admissions tutor Harry Judge. In an article he wrote for The Spectator, he said that his father phoned Judge to clarify the situation – Judge was in a meeting with the PPE tutors at the time, and after some discussion, they decided to offer Young a place owing to a moral obligation the mistaken acceptance created.

Young graduated in 1986 with a first in PPE, and then worked for The Times for six months as a news trainee until he was fired for (according to Young himself) hacking the computer system, impersonating the editor Charles Wilson and circulating information about senior executives' salaries to others around the building. He was awarded a Fulbright Scholarship and studied at Harvard then spent two years at Trinity College, Cambridge, where he carried out research for a PhD which he left without completing.

== Journalism, writing and activism ==
In 1991, Young co-founded and co-edited the Modern Review with Julie Burchill and her then husband Cosmo Landesman. Its motto was "Low culture for highbrows". "The whole enterprise was driven by one fairly simple idea", Young said in 2005. "And that was that critics had a responsibility to take the best popular culture as seriously as the best high culture".

Four years later the magazine was close to financial collapse and Young closed it down, angering his principal financial backer Peter York, as well as Burchill and staff writer Charlotte Raven. Burchill had tried to replace Young as editor with Raven. "Ultimately the reason we fell out is because our relationship began as a kind of mentor-apprentice, and that was a kind of relationship which Julie was comfortable with. It was only when I succeeded in getting out from under her shadow that our relationship deteriorated", Young said in 2005.

Young moved to New York City shortly afterwards to work for Vanity Fair. In the time he wrote for the magazine he contributed 3,000 words, and was paid $85,000. After being sacked by Vanity Fair in 1998, he stayed in New York for two more years, working as a columnist for the New York Press, before returning to the UK in 2000. A memoir of these years, How to Lose Friends and Alienate People, was published in 2001.

Following Jack Davenport, Young performed in the West End one-man stage adaptation of How to Lose Friends and Alienate People in 2004. Theatre critic Lyn Gardner gave it a one star review commenting that "The curious thing about this is that Young's day job is as theatre critic of the Spectator. You would think he might have developed some respect for the job that actors do. Clearly not. But then, neither does he appear to have picked up any tips on acting along the way." A review in The Stage stated, "Despite Young's previous thespic experience being the only student at Anna Scher's drama school not to get a part in Grange Hill and having been fired after a week as an extra on the film Another Country, he gives a thoroughly convincing performance as himself…". The Evening Standard praised his performance. In 2005, he co-wrote (with fellow Spectator journalist Lloyd Evans) a sex farce about the David Blunkett/Kimberley Quinn intrigue and the "Sextator" affairs of Boris Johnson and Rod Liddle called Who's the Daddy? It was named as the Best New Comedy at the 2006 Theatregoers' Choice Awards. The following year A Right Royal Farce, Young and Evans' play about sexual antics of the British royal family was poorly received by the press. Young said of the play "It was an unqualified disaster". It received scathing reviews from the Evening Standard and The Guardian.

From 2002 to 2007, Young wrote a restaurant column for the Evening Standard and claimed in a PM (BBC Radio 4) club membership discussion (20 March 2024) with Evan Davis that he was previously blackballed from joining the Garrick Club, a decade earlier, for criticising their catering in his column, while working for the Evening Standard. He later authored a restaurant column for The Independent on Sunday. In addition to serving as a judge on Top Chef, Young has competed in the Channel 4 TV series Come Dine with Me, appearing as one of the panel of food critics in the 2008 BBC Two series Eating with the Enemy and served as a judge on Hell's Kitchen.

Young is an associate editor of The Spectator, where he writes a weekly column, the editor of Spectator Life and a regular contributor to the Daily Mail and The Daily Telegraph. His Telegraph blog was long-listed for the 2012 George Orwell Prize for blogging. He was a political columnist for The Sun on Sunday for its first 11 months.

During the 2015 Labour leadership election, he encouraged readers of the politically conservative Daily Telegraph to join the Labour party and support Jeremy Corbyn, who Young thought was the weakest candidate.

In February 2020, Young co-founded the Free Speech Union. In November 2021 he was awarded the 2021 Contrarian Prize.

In 2019, Young supported Boris Johnson for leader of the Conservative Party. In 2020, he said he was wrong to back him. Two years later he again backed Johnson as party leader. In 2023, the New Statesman named Young as the 44th most influential right-wing figure in British politics.

== Free schools advocate ==
Young was a proposer and co-founder of the West London Free School, the first free school to sign a funding agreement with the Education Secretary, and is now a trustee of The West London Free School Academy Trust, the charitable trust that manages the school. The school was founded at Palingswick House, which displaced over 20 voluntary organisations previously located there. He stood down as CEO of the school in May 2016 after admitting that he did not realise how difficult it was going to be to run. The national press coverage of the school having four headteachers in six years was linked to the higher profile for the school caused by its connection to Young. The trust opened a primary school in Hammersmith in 2013, a second primary in Earls Court in 2014 and a third primary in Kensington in 2016. Young is a follower of the American educationalist E. D. Hirsch and an advocate of a traditional, knowledge-based approach to education.

In 2012, Young wrote an article in The Spectator criticising the emphasis on "inclusion" in state schools, saying that the word "inclusive" was "one of those ghastly, politically correct words that have survived the demise of New Labour. Schools have got to be 'inclusive' these days. That means wheelchair ramps, the complete works of Alice Walker in the school library...". Young denied that he was attacking the provision of equal access to mainstream schools for people with disabilities, saying he was only referring to the alleged "dumbing down" of the curriculum.

In 2015, the London Review of Books's cover story for its May 7 issue was an article written by British journalist Dawn Foster criticising the free school movement. In a letter to the London Review of Books, Young took issue with Foster's interpretation of free schools data and made claims that were challenged by the author Michael Rosen, journalist Melissa Benn, and education researcher Janet Downs in further letters written to the publication. Foster responded to Young in the London Review of Books letters refuting Young's criticism and wrote:

Creaming off the children of more affluent parents constitutes social segregation; so too does the existence of religious free schools. Young seems to think he is held in high regard by free school advocates. When I mentioned his name in the course of interviewing a former Department for Education employee for the piece, my interviewee headbutted the restaurant table in exasperation. I have found the sentiment, if not the gesture, to be common among his ideological comrades.

From 2016 to 2018, Young was Director of the New Schools Network, a charity founded in 2009 to support groups setting up free schools.

== Eugenics ==
In 2015, Young wrote an article for the Australian magazine Quadrant entitled "The fall of meritocracy". Under a section titled "Progressive eugenics" he discussed developments in genetically engineered intelligence, and proposed that should the technology for selecting embryos for high intelligence become practicable, it could be provided "free of charge to parents on low incomes with below-average IQs." He argued this "could help to address the problem of flat-lining inter-generational social mobility and serve as a counterweight to the tendency for the meritocratic elite to become a hereditary elite," through a mechanism that should be acceptable to political conservatives and also argued that "This is a kind of eugenics that should appeal to liberals — progressive eugenics." Young has maintained that criticism of him as a eugenicist is "based on a deliberate misreading" of the article and that "If 'eugenics' is forced sterilisation, what I was proposing was the opposite — free IVF for the poor."

Young attended the London Conference on Intelligence at University College London (UCL) in 2017, which was described by the media and a number of politicians as a "secret eugenics conference". Young said that he attended the conference as a journalist to report about it (which he later did), in preparation for the "super-respectable" International Society for Intelligence Research conference in Montreal in July 2017 at which he gave a speech, which was later published.

== Office for Students ==
In January 2018 Young was announced as one of the non-executive members of the board for the new Office for Students (OfS), a body intended to ensure institutions in higher education are accountable. The Guardian later exposed misleading claims made by the Department for Education concerning Young's teaching posts at the University of Cambridge and Harvard revealing that, although Young had taught at the universities, he had not been appointed to an academic post. The appointment became the subject of controversy when Twitter posts, described as "misogynistic and homophobic", were uncovered. He resigned a week later, stating that his appointment had "become a distraction" counteracting the "vital work" of the OfS. Shortly afterwards he resigned also as a Fulbright Commissioner.

An inquiry was launched shortly after Young's resignation by Peter Riddell, the Commissioner for Public Appointments. Riddell said the OfS panel report to ministers about Young "made no mention of Mr Young’s history of controversial comments and use of social media". The disquiet which followed "makes a strong case for more extensive due diligence inquiries".

== COVID-19 pandemic ==
In March 2020, during the early stages of the COVID-19 pandemic in the UK, Young wrote in The Critic that he "suspect[ed] the Government has overreacted to the coronavirus crisis", expressing worry about the "economic cost". In opposition to lockdown and some social distancing (both introduced to flatten the infection curve, thus reducing peak incidence and overall deaths, as modelled by the COVID-19 Response Team led by Neil Ferguson at Imperial College London,) Young wrote: "spending £350 billion to prolong the lives of a few hundred thousand mostly elderly people is an irresponsible use of taxpayer's money." He called for lockdown to end on April 14 (or at the latest the following week). Instead he proposed, "limiting social distancing measures to the elderly and those with underlying health conditions." Saying that he had probably contracted the virus, he wrote that "if the Government does end the lockdown, and it turns out that by the time I require critical care the NHS cannot accommodate me, I won't regret writing this". He argued his own death would be "acceptable collateral damage". Peter Jukes wrote that Young's views could be "outright deadly" in a pandemic; Darren McGarvey compared Young's views to austerity.

In April 2020 Young initiated the Lockdown Sceptics newsletter (now retitled The Daily Sceptic).

In June 2020, he wrote that "the virus has all but disappeared". In January 2021, he appeared on Newsnight, and when he was challenged about his comments about the virus, he said: "hands up, I got that wrong" and made arguments against lockdowns.

On 14 January 2021, the British press regulator IPSO ruled that an article Young had written for The Daily Telegraph in July 2020 was "significantly misleading" and that the newspaper had failed to take care not to publish inaccurate information. In the article, Young claimed that common cold coronaviruses gave people immunity against SARS-CoV-2, and that in July 2020 London had almost achieved herd immunity. Neither claim was supported by scientists at the time. IPSO ordered the newspaper to publish a correction. The Telegraph removed the article from its website and Young deleted many of his tweets about the pandemic.

The Daily Sceptic has promoted misinformation about COVID-19 vaccines. In September 2022, PayPal shut down the accounts of Young, the Free Speech Union and The Daily Sceptic website. The accounts were closed because of breaches of PayPal's acceptable use policy, thought to be because of alleged misinformation about COVID-19 vaccines. The accounts were restored later that month after extensive criticism of PayPal's actions by MPs.

== House of Lords ==
In late 2024, Young was nominated for a life peerage by Kemi Badenoch, the leader of the Conservative Party. He was created Baron Young of Acton, of Acton in the London Borough of Ealing, on 21 January 2025, and was introduced to the House of Lords on 28 January that year. He is affiliated to the Conservatives.

== Published works ==
In addition to the book How to Lose Friends and Alienate People, Young is the author of The Sound of No Hands Clapping (2006), How to Set Up a Free School (2011) and What Every Parent Needs to Know: How to Help Your Child Get the Most Out of Primary School (2014), which he co-wrote with Miranda Thomas.

== Film and television ==
British producer Stephen Woolley and his wife Elizabeth Karlsen produced the film adaptation How to Lose Friends & Alienate People (2008) in conjunction with FilmFour. Young, who co-produced the film, was played by Simon Pegg. It was released in Britain on 3 October 2008 and reached the number one spot at the box office in its opening week. The film received mostly negative reviews and was a commercial failure, losing over £8 million.

Young co-produced and co-wrote When Boris Met Dave (2009), a drama-documentary for Channel 4 about the relationship between Eton and Oxford University contemporaries Mayor Boris Johnson and Conservative Party Leader PM David Cameron. It was first broadcast on More4 on 7 October 2009 and later shown on Channel 4.

== On social media ==
Young has come under criticism for comments he made on Twitter, most of which were deleted upon his appointment to the Board of the Office for Students. Young said that he posted more than 56,000 tweets, of which 8,439 remained as at January 2018.

These included what an Evening Standard editorial called "an obsession with commenting on the anatomy of women in the public eye". He referred on Twitter to the cleavage of unnamed female MPs sitting behind Ed Miliband in the Commons in 2011 and 2012. When later challenged by Stella Creasy on Newsnight, he said of the second such incident: "It wasn't my proudest moment". Other remarks included slurs described as homophobic, including a claim that George Clooney is "as queer as a coot".

One tweet by Young was in response to a BBC Comic Relief appeal in 2009 for starving Kenyan children. During the broadcast, a Twitter user commented that she had "gone through about 5 boxes of kleenex" whilst watching. Toby Young replied: "Me too, I havn't [sic] wanked so much in ages". He has expressed regret for his "politically incorrect" tweets.

Young is reported to have edited his own Wikipedia page 282 times over the course of six years. In October 2020, he wrote an article in The Spectator criticising "lazy journalists [for whom] Wikipedia is the only thing they read when 'researching' an article" and stating that "Wikipedia has a strong left-wing bias — which might explain why the page about me reads as if it's been written by Owen Jones." In October 2026 Young wrote a column in The Spectator complaining of claimed inaccuracies and "left wing bias" in his own Wikipedia entry, and across Wikipedia more generally.

== Personal life ==
In 1997, Young met Caroline Bondy while living in New York. After they split up, Young gave up drinking, saying he "thought the only way I could persuade her to get back with me would be if I sobered up". He began drinking alcohol again two years later, on their wedding day in July 2001. They have four children.

Young has admitted using cocaine at the Groucho Club in central London, and also supplying drugs to others. He was subsequently expelled from membership of the club in late 2001 for writing about the cocaine use of friends he had supplied with the drug during a 1997 photo shoot for Vanity Fair.
