= Augustine Abbey =

Ghanaian actor

- Born: Augustine Abbey; Ghana
- Other name: Idikoko
- Occupations: Actor, producer, director, film writer
- Years active: 1970s–present
- Spouse: Linda Quashiga
- Awards: 1979 Arts Council of Ghana, Leisure Awards 1988, Leisure Awards 1989, Best NAFTI Actor 1999

Augustine Abbey, also known as Idikoko, is a Ghanaian actor and movie maker known for comedy. He is also known for his main roles as a house boy or gate man. He has produced and starred in a BBC documentary and also directed and produced a film on HIV and AIDS in partnership with UNESCO and Esi Sutherland-Addy's MMOFRA Foundation.

He runs Great Idikoko Ventures and is married to fellow actress Linda Quashiga. He attended Presbyterian Boys' Secondary School.

Matters of the Heart (1993), Triple Echo (1997), and Dark Sand (1999) are well-known works by Augustine Abbey.

== Filmography ==
=== Films ===
Year	Title	Role	Cast
2016	Shampaign	Mr. Hawkson	
1991	Tricky Twist		Augustine Abbey (Idikoko); Raymond Kudzawu-D'Pherdd
1993	Matters of the Heart		Grace Omaboe; Alexandra Duah; Augustine Abbey (Idikoko); Grace Nortey; Enoch Botchway; Mac Jordan Amartey; Adwoa Smart; Sheila Nortey; Sarah Boison; Raymond Kudzawu-D'Pherdd (Kilango)
	Bitter Love		
	Ingratitude		
	Stolen Bible		
	Stolen Pregnancy		
	Recipe For Disaster		
	Money Bag		
	Alokodongo		

== Awards and nominations ==
Augustine Abbey has won the following awards.

Year	Nominated work	Award	Category	Result
1979		Arts Council of Ghana	Best Juvenile Actor	Won
1988	The Game	Leisure Awards	Best Script	Won
1989		Leisure Awards	Best Script, Best Actor and TV Personality of the Year	Won
1999	Alokodongo		Best NAFTI Actor	Won
	Ingratitude	Festival of Nations - Australia	Best Film and Video	Nominated
