= Barimah =

Barimah is a surname. Notable people with the surname include:

- H. D. Twum-Barimah, Ghanaian military personnel
- Jude Adjei-Barimah (born 1992), Italian player of American football
- Nana Twum Barimah, Ghanaian actor
- Paul Apreku Twum Barimah (born 1982), Ghanaian politician
- Yaw Barimah (born 1949), Ghanaian politician,
