= Nana Twum Barimah =

Ghanaian actor and comedian

Nana Twum Barima
- Other names: Dr. Rokoto
- Occupations: Chief & Actor

Nana Twum Barimah, also known as Dr. Rokoto, is a Ghanaian film and television actor and comedian who has contributed to the growth of the film industry. He co-hosted By the Fireside with Maame Dokono on GTV in the 1990s and early 2000s.

Legacy and Recognition

Nana Twum Barimah is widely considered one of the key figures who helped popularize televised comedy in Ghana. Through his work on Concert Party, he helped pave the way for later Ghanaian comedians such as Funny Face, Kyekyeku, and Ajeezay. He remains an advocate for preserving Ghana’s stage-acting traditions and using comedy as a tool for education and social awareness.

== Career ==
He has featured in movies and television series like Obra and co-hosted by the fireside with Mame Dokono. He also was a radio presenter at New York where he discussed social, domestic and health issues blended with comedy. He also worked with Waterproof on various comedy concerts. He is currently the Chief of Aperade in the Eastern Region.

== Filmography ==
- Obra
- Coming To Ghana
- By the Fireside (Ghanaian TV program)
