= My Very Ghanaian Wedding =

- Directed by: Helel Smith
- Written by: Helel Smith
- Starring: Claudia Abbey, Adjetey Anang, Elaine Attoh, Grace Omaboe
- Release date: 2017
- Country: Ghana
- Language: English

My Very Ghanaian Wedding is a Ghanaian romance comedy released in the year, 2017. The movie was written and directed by Helel Smith.

== Casts ==
- Claudia Abbey as Gigi
- Elaine Attoh as Beth Owusu
- Albert Jackson Davis as Priest
- Adjetey Anang as Paul Opong
- Eli Cecilson as Vanessa
- Dede Djamaki as Melissa
- Dzifa Glikpoe as Stella
- Ludwig Mawuli Kalms Kwame as Ludwig Kalms
- Lorku Lumor
- Alvin Muss
- Vincent McCauley as Jojo
- Amy Okaitei Serwa as Amy Okaitey
- Grace Omaboe as Gloria Opong
- Helel Smith as Jacob
- Grace Tibu as Sonya
- Sitsofe Tsikor as Marian
- Dana Wachter Melani as Sanchez
- James Kwayisi Wiafe Nana Opong as James Wiafe
