= Obra =

Obra or Obras may refer to:

- Obra (river), a river in west Poland
- Obra, Uttar Pradesh, a town in the Indian state of Uttar Pradesh, India
- Obra, Bihar, a town in Bihar, India
  - Obra, Bihar Assembly constituency, Bihar
- Obra, Uttar Pradesh Assembly constituency, India
- Obra, Greater Poland Voivodeship, in west-central Poland
- Öbrä, a village in Biektaw District, Tatarstan, Russia
- Tiento, a musical genre also known as obra
- Oregon Bicycle Racing Association
- Obra (TV drama), a TV drama series on GTV in Ghana
- Obra (TV program), a drama anthology airing on GMA Network
- Obras Sanitarias, an Argentine basketball team
  - Estadio Obras Sanitarias, stadium of the Argentine team, also used for music concerts
- Omnibus Budget Reconciliation Act of 1990, a United States statute signed by President George H.W. Bush
- Omnibus Budget Reconciliation Act of 1993, a United States statute signed by President Bill Clinton
