= Grace Nortey =

Ghanaian actress (1937–2026)

- Born: 1 February 1937
- Died: 26 August 2026 (aged 89)
- Occupation: Actress
- Years active: 1970s–2026
- Children: 5

Grace Nortey (1 February 1937 – 26 August 2026) was a Ghanaian actress who played several lead roles on Ghanaian television. She was active in the film, theatre, and drama industries for over five decades and was considered to have been one of the veterans of Ghanaian theatre and drama.

== Early life ==
Grace Nortey was born on 1 February 1937.

Nortey had five children, including Sheila Nortey who is also an actress.

== Career ==
Nortey played different roles and starred in several movie productions released by the National Film and Television Institute (NAFTI).

She was often typecast as a feisty, vocal, assertive, eloquent, simple and straightforward, and strong-willed matriarch who confronted outmoded and discriminatory traditions and practices, including the deeply conservative views of the patriarchy, male dominance, backward and dehumanizing gender-based violence, class discrimination, institutional corruption, and social injustice, among others.

Nortey's popularity was largely attributed to numerous onscreen confrontations with unwieldy and uncompromising male adversaries, including the likes of Solomon Sampa, MacJordan Amartey, George Williams, Kofi Adjorlolo, and William Addo (Akpatse), among others.

She was particularly active between the 1980s and the turn of the millennium—the period often described as the golden age of Ghanaian theatre and drama when primetime evening entertainment TV programmes such as "Obra," "Osofo Dadzie," "Key Soap Concert Party," "Cantata," "Taxi Driver," and "Thursday Theatre" were at the height of their popularity. She had starred in numerous stage productions before appearing in film and television. Before gaining fame on television, she hosted a radio talk show for Ga women that sought to empower women ("Nyeawokoshie") on Radio One in the 1970s. Her first major appearance on the screen was in the 1986 King Ampaw/Peter Wohlgemuth-Reinery co-produced Afro Movies comic film "Juju," where she played the wife of fellow veteran actor Joe Eyison, alongside the likes of Emmanuel Agbenowu, Grace Ofoe, Osei Kwabena, and Evans Oma Hunter, among others. Some of her most notable movies include Lost Hope, Dza Gbele, Matters of the Heart, Sekina, Expectations, Jewels, Beasts of No Nation (2015) which starred Abraham Atta as Aku, Ties That Bind (2011), Sinking Sands (2011), Nana Akoto (1985), Escape to Love (1996), and The Other Side of The Rich (1992), among others.

Problems with her physical health that became chronic and acute eyesight issues in later years meant that she no longer took on highly scripted or physically demanding acting roles due to restrictions on her mobility and the challenges of reading long scripts. Nonetheless, she still performed minor roles in movies and drama, which required less physical movement and also provided greater scope for on-set improvisation.

== Advocacy ==
Nortey was a member of the Ghana Actors Guild, which seeks to promote the welfare of members past and present.

She furthermore stressed the need for actors to obtain formal education and academic training in acting before pursuing a full-time career in the industry.

== Death ==
In her later years, Grace Nortey encountered the typical challenges associated with aging, such as health issues and a reduced role in the entertainment industry. She died on 26 August 2026, at the age of 89.

== Filmography ==
=== Film ===
Year	Film	Role	Notes
1985	Nana Akoto		
1992	My Destiny/Kofi Nkrabea	Mother	
1992	The Other Side of the Rich	Mrs. Ampofo	
1993	Matters of the Heart		
2006	Frozen Emotion		Direct-to-video
2008	Before My Eyes	Wummi	Direct-to-video
2009	My Sister's honour	Mrs. Wills	Drama
2011	Sinking Sands	Grandma	
2011	Ties That Bind	Church Member	
2015	Beasts of No Nation	Old Witch Woman	
2016	Amakye and Dede		Comedy
2019	P over D	Ayorkor	
2019	'95	Old Woman	

== Awards ==
Nortey received several awards, including a Lifetime Achievement Award at the Black Star International Film Festival, along with honors at the Ghana Movie Awards and the Glitz Women of the Year Honours.

- Best Cameo Actress (Movie: "Adams Apple") - Ghana Movie Awards (2011).
- Excellence in Arts – Glitz Women of the Year Honours (2016).
- Lifetime Achievement Award - Black Star International Film Festival (BSIFF) Awards (2018).
- Legendary Award for Outstanding Contributions: Ghana Actors Entertainment Award (GAEA) – (2020).
- Outstanding Contribution to Women's Excellence in The Performing Arts - 3Music Awards Women's Brunch (2021).
