= Beasts of No Nation (film) =

2015 American war drama film

- Theatrical release poster
- Directed by: Cary Joji Fukunaga
- Screenplay by: Cary Joji Fukunaga
- Based on: Beasts of No Nation by Uzodinma Iweala
- Produced by: Amy Kaufman; Cary Joji Fukunaga; Daniela Taplin Lundberg; Riva Marker; Jeffrey Skoll; Daniel Crown; Idris Elba; Uzodinma Iweala
- Starring: Idris Elba; Kurt Egyiawan; Jude Akuwudike; Emmanuel "King Kong" Nii Adom Quaye; Abraham Attah
- Cinematography: Cary Joji Fukunaga
- Edited by: Mikkel E. G. Nielsen; Pete Beaudreau
- Music by: Dan Romer
- Production companies: Participant Media; Red Crown Productions; New Balloon; Primary Productions; Parliament of Owls
- Distributed by: Netflix; Bleecker Street
- Release dates: September 3, 2015 (Venice); October 16, 2015 (Worldwide)
- Running time: 138 minutes
- Country: United States
- Languages: English; Krio; Twi
- Budget: $6 million
- Box office: $90,777

Beasts of No Nation is a 2015 American war drama film written, co-produced, shot, and directed by Cary Joji Fukunaga. It follows a young boy who becomes a child soldier as his country experiences a horrific civil war. Shot in Ghana and starring Idris Elba, Abraham Attah, Ama K. Abebrese, Grace Nortey, David Dontoh, and Opeyemi Fagbohungbe, the film is based on the 2005 novel of the same name by Uzodinma Iweala, the book itself being named after a Fela Kuti album.

It was screened in the main competition section of the 72nd Venice International Film Festival, where Attah won the Marcello Mastroianni Award. The film was shown in the Special Presentation section of the 2015 Toronto International Film Festival, and released on Netflix globally and in a limited release by Bleecker Street on October 16, 2015. It is the first film to be released directly on Netflix. The film received positive reviews from critics and numerous accolades. Elba's performance earned nominations for the BAFTA, Golden Globe, Spirit, and SAG Award for Best Supporting Actor, winning the latter two.

== Plot ==
A young boy, Agu, lives in a small West African village with his parents and siblings, located within a "buffer zone" enforced by ECOMOG troops. The village is informed that the government has fallen and that military-aligned rebels have seized control of the country. With rebel forces headed toward the village, many people flee to the country's capital for safety. Agu's father buys safe transport for his wife and two youngest children, but has to stay behind with Agu and his eldest son. Rebel and government forces fight in and around Agu's village. While the rebel soldiers flee, government forces round up the remaining villagers and execute them, but Agu escapes into the jungle.

After wandering for a while, Agu is caught up in a guerrilla skirmish. The Native Defense Forces (NDF), a rising rebel faction in the country, adopt Agu into their ranks. Agu's battalion is led by the Commandant, who takes Agu under his wing. Following a brutal initiation process in which Agu hacks an innocent captive to death with a machete, Agu becomes a fully fledged member of the militia. Agu befriends another young NDF child soldier, Strika, who never speaks.

One night, the Commandant summons Agu to his quarters and rapes him. Strika, another of the Commandant's rape victims, comforts him. Preacher, an older soldier, gives Agu brown-brown to lift his mood. Agu and Strika take part in a number of bloody battles and ambushes. During one of the raids, Agu, under the influence of brown-brown, mistakes a villager for his mother. He exclaims that he has found her and clings to her while the other members of the group declare that they want to rape her. The woman does not recognize Agu, and he calls her a witch woman. Agu then shoots the woman while she is being raped.

The battalion's many victories earn them a summons to the rebel headquarters, where the Commandant, accompanied by Agu, Strika, and a few other soldiers, goes to meet with the NDF leader, Dada Goodblood. Goodblood, who stresses the importance of public image in the wake of the conflict becoming world news, denies the Commandant his promised promotion to General and removes him from command. The Commandant's lieutenant, Two I-C, will take control of the battalion, and the Commandant will be made Deputy Chief of Security under the leader.

The Commandant views this as an insult and leaves to "celebrate" with his men at a brothel. While the adult soldiers spend the night with the brothel's women, one of the women shoots Two I-C. Two I-C accuses the Commandant of orchestrating the incident before dying, while the Commandant insists it must have been a botched attempt against himself. The prostitute professes that it was an accident, but the Commandant and his men shoot the women and leave the city.

Now on the run from their own faction as well as their enemies, the battalion suffers heavy losses. Air strikes and supply shortages kill Strika and many others. The survivors take shelter at a gold mine for several months, hoping to find gold to pay for supplies. Ammunition runs out, leaving the group with no way to defend themselves from encroaching enemy forces. Following a confrontation between a frustrated Preacher and a paranoid Commandant, Agu and the soldiers abandon the Commandant to surrender, ignoring his warnings that they will merely be thrown in jail and disowned by their families. Shortly after, they are detained by UN troops.

The younger members of the battalion are sent to a missionary school in a safe part of the country, while Preacher and Randy decide to run away to rejoin the war. Agu avoids the other children, who play games and enjoy the comfort and safety of the school. Agu suffers from drug withdrawal, is tormented by what has happened, and has nightmares about it. Eventually, Agu tells the school's counselor that he has done some terrible things, which he fears will make her see him as a "beast." Instead, he tells her how he used to be a good boy from a family who loved him. The final scene shows Agu finally joining the other boys as they swim and play in the ocean.

== Cast ==
- Abraham Attah as Agu
- Idris Elba as Commandant
- Kurt Egyiawan as 2nd I-C
- Jude Akuwudike as Dada Goodblood
- Emmanuel "King Kong" Nii Adom Quaye as Strika
- Ama K. Abebrese as Mother
- Kobina Amissa-Sam as Father
- Grace Nortey as Old Witch Woman
- David Dontoh as Linguist
- Opeyemi Fagbohungbe as Sergeant Gaz
- Teibu Owusu Acheampong as Preacher
- Fred Amugi as Pastor

== Production ==
Cary Joji Fukunaga directed his own script, after having worked on it for seven years. It was not until after six years of research on the Sierra Leone Civil War that Fukunaga came across the Beasts of No Nation novel. He told Creative Screenwriting, "I read through the novel and I loved the elegant and concise way that Uzodinma Iweala told the story. I felt that would be the best way to enter the subject."

The dialogue in the screenplay is faithful in form to the novel, originally written in a lighter form of Nigerian Pidgin English known as Krio.

On August 20, 2013, Idris Elba joined the cast of the film adaptation. On June 6, 2014, Ghanaian actors Ama K. Abebrese, Grace Nortey and David Dontoh joined the film. Later, Opeyemi Fagbohungbe also joined the cast.

Red Crown Productions was the financier and producer, along with Primary Productions and Parliament of Owls. On May 17, 2014, Participant Media, along with Mammoth Entertainment, came on board to co-finance the film, initially budgeted at $4.3 million but which ultimately cost about $6 million.

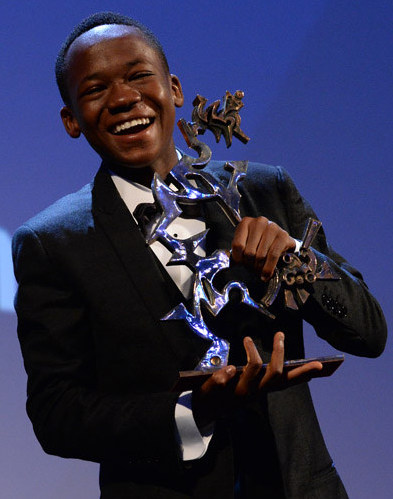
Abraham Attah

On June 5, 2014, principal photography was underway in the Eastern Region of Ghana. The film was shot at locations in Koforidua and Ezile Bay at Akwidaa. The costumes for the child soldiers were inspired by the uniforms of the Kamajors, who wore fabric patches on their shirts as a form of protection. Dan Romer scored the film.

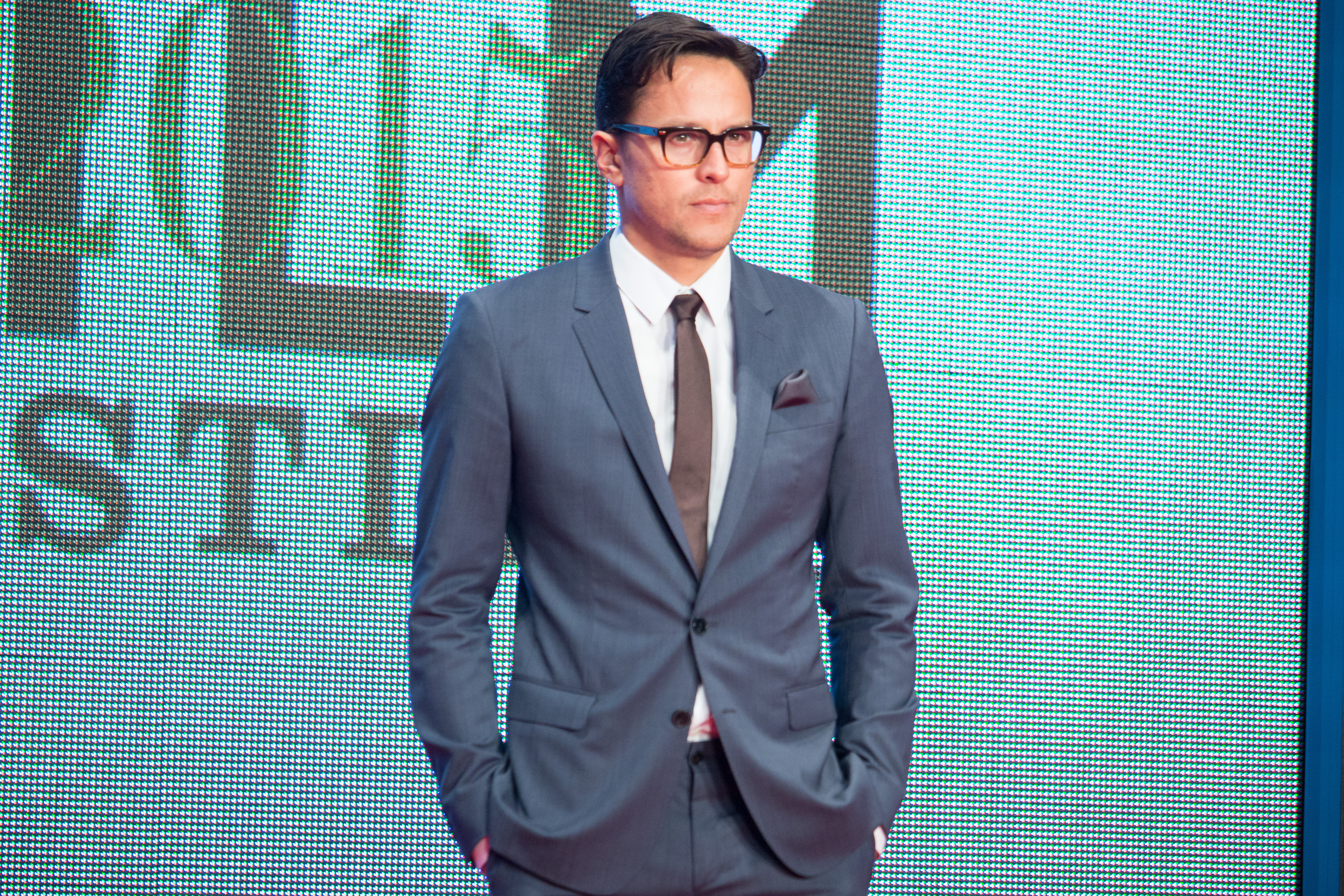
Cary Joji Fukunaga at the opening ceremony of the 28th Tokyo International Film Festival

== Release ==
Netflix bought the worldwide distribution rights for around $12 million. The film was simultaneously released theatrically and online through its subscription video on demand service on October 16, 2015, with Bleecker Street handling the theatrical release. Considering the online release a violation of the traditional 90-day release window of exclusivity to theatres, AMC Cinemas, Carmike Cinemas, Cinemark, and Regal Entertainment Group—four of the largest theater chains in the United States—announced that they would boycott Beasts of No Nation, effectively downgrading it to a limited release at smaller and independent theatres. The film was also theatrically released in the UK on October 16, 2015, in Curzon Cinemas.

=== Critical reception ===
On Rotten Tomatoes, the film has a rating of 91% based on 150 reviews, with an average rating of 7.90/10. The website's critical consensus reads, "Beasts of No Nation finds writer-director Cary Fukunaga working with a talented cast to offer a sobering, uncompromising, yet still somehow hopeful picture of war's human cost." On Metacritic, the film has a score of 79 out of 100, based on 30 critics, indicating "generally favourable" reviews.

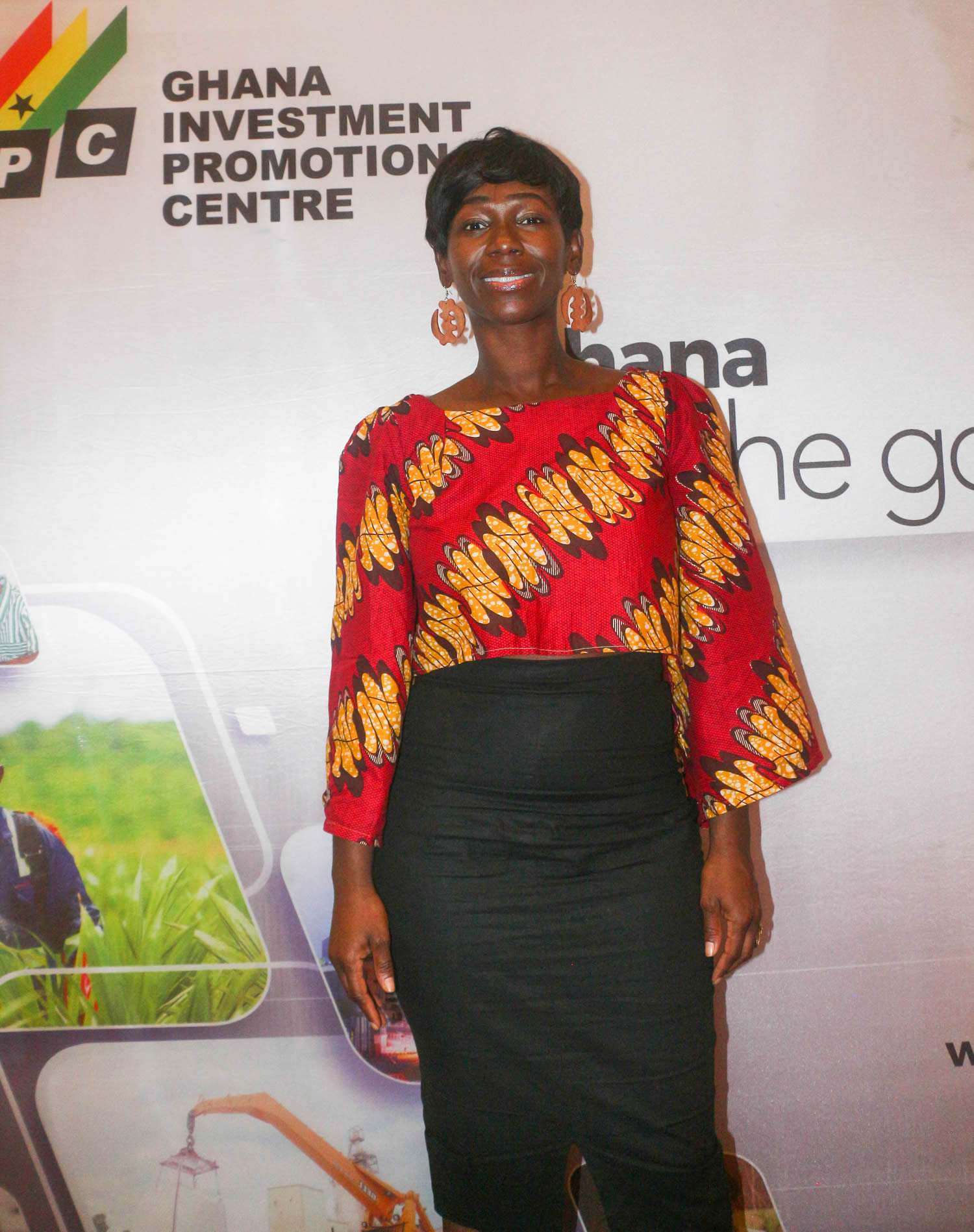
Ama K Abebrese

=== Home media ===
The film was released on Blu-ray and DVD by The Criterion Collection in August 2021.

=== Controversy ===
In 2015, Artnet published an article suggesting that Fukunaga had appropriated content without crediting the work of Irish artist Richard Mosse, whose work used infrared film and depicted child soldiers in the Democratic Republic of Congo.

=== Accolades ===
Award	Category	Recipient	Result
British Academy Film Awards	Best Actor in a Supporting Role	Idris Elba	Nominated
Costume Designers Guild Awards	Excellence in Contemporary Film	Jenny Eagan	Won
Empire Awards	Best Male Newcomer	Abraham Attah	Nominated
Film Independent Spirit Awards	Best Feature	Daniel Crown, Idris Elba, Cary Joji Fukunaga, Uzodinma Iweala, Amy Kaufman, Daniela Taplin Lundberg, Riva Marker and Jeffrey Skoll	Nominated
Film Independent Spirit Awards	Best Director	Cary Joji Fukunaga	Nominated
Film Independent Spirit Awards	Best Male Lead	Abraham Attah	Won
Film Independent Spirit Awards	Best Supporting Male	Idris Elba	Won
Film Independent Spirit Awards	Best Cinematography	Cary Joji Fukunaga	Nominated
Golden Globe Awards	Best Performance by an Actor in a Supporting Role in any Motion Picture	Idris Elba	Nominated
Indiana Film Journalists Association Awards	Best Film		Nominated
Indiana Film Journalists Association Awards	Best Adapted Screenplay	Cary Joji Fukunaga	Nominated
Indiana Film Journalists Association Awards	Best Director	Cary Joji Fukunaga	Nominated
Indiana Film Journalists Association Awards	Best Actor	Abraham Attah	Nominated
Indiana Film Journalists Association Awards	Best Supporting Actor	Idris Elba	Runner-up
National Board of Review	Breakthrough Performance	Abraham Attah	Won
NAACP Image Awards	Outstanding Motion Picture		Nominated
NAACP Image Awards	Outstanding Actor in a Motion Picture	Abraham Attah	Nominated
NAACP Image Awards	Outstanding Supporting Actor in a Motion Picture	Idris Elba	Nominated
NAACP Image Awards	Outstanding Independent Motion Picture		Won
George Foster Peabody Award	Excellence	Red Crown Productions, Participant Media, Come What May Productions, and New Balloon (Distributed by Netflix)	Won
Screen Actors Guild Awards	Outstanding Performance by a Cast in a Motion Picture	Abraham Attah, Kurt Egyiawan and Idris Elba	Nominated
Screen Actors Guild Awards	Outstanding Performance by a Male Actor in a Supporting Role	Idris Elba	Won
72nd Venice International Film Festival	Marcello Mastroianni Award	Abraham Attah	Won
