= Adwoa Smart =

Ghanaian actress

- Born: Belinda Naa Ode Oku; October 5, 1970 (age 55); Abossey Okai, Accra, Ghana
- Other name: Adwoa Smart
- Occupation: Actress
- Years active: 1980s–present
- Known for: Obra, Efiewura, Yaa Asantewaa, Money Bag, Father and Son

Adwoa Smart (born Belinda Naa Ode Oku on 5 October 1970) is a Ghanaian actress known for her roles in television dramas and films, particularly in the 1980s and 1990s. She gained attention for her work on the television series Obra and has appeared in other Ghanaian productions such as Efiewura.

== Early life and education ==
Adwoa Smart was born Belinda Naa Ode Oku in Abossey Okai, a suburb of Accra, Ghana. During her early years, she faced challenges in formal education due to social stigma attached to her small stature. Before entering the acting profession, she worked as a market trader at Kaneshie Market in Accra. Her talents in dancing and performance were noticed by actress Grace Omaboe, who became her mentor and helped her transition into acting

== Career ==
Adwoa Smart began as a cast member of the Ghanaian television drama Obra, which aired on the Ghana Broadcasting Corporation’s GTV. She subsequently appeared in the long-running TV sitcom Efiewura. Smart has also featured in several Ghanaian films, including Matters of the Heart (1993) and Black Star (2006).

== Personal life ==
Adwoa Smart has spoken publicly about the challenges she faced due to her stature and the impact of bullying on her childhood and education. In interviews, she has also discussed her views on relationships and personal life

== Filmography ==
- Obra
- Matters of the Heart (1993)
- Efiewura
- Yaa Asantewaa
- It's too late
- Father and Son
- Money Bag
- Judgement Day
- Lucifer
- Shout at the Devil (2001) as Araba
- Black Star (2006) as Referee
- Black Star 2 (2006) as Referee
