= Matters of the Heart (1993 film) =

Ghanaian film

Matters Of The Heart
- Directed by: Augustine Abbey
- Written by: Augustine Abbey
- Production company: Great Idikoko Production
- Release date: 1993
- Running time: 119 minutes
- Country: Ghana
- Language: English

Matters of The Heart is a 1993 Ghanaian romance film directed and written by Augustine Abbey.

== Plot ==
The movie revolves around Niko and Sekina, two people who were madly in love. However, Niko's family does not approve of his relationship with Sekina; she is from a very poor background whereas Niko is from a wealthy family.

== Cast ==
- Sarah Boison as Sekina
  - Priscilla Okai as young Sekina
- Kofi Dennis as Niko
- Grace Omaboe as Mama Jokeh
- Alexandra Duah as Mummy
- Augustine Abbey/Idikoko as himself
- Grace Nortey as Mama Abissi
- Enoch Botchway as Dr. Dela
- Mac Jordan Amartey as Baba Issifu
- Adwoa Smart
- Sheila Nortey
- Raymond Kudzawu-D'Pherdd
