= Actor Award for Outstanding Performance by a Male Actor in a Supporting Role =

Annual film award

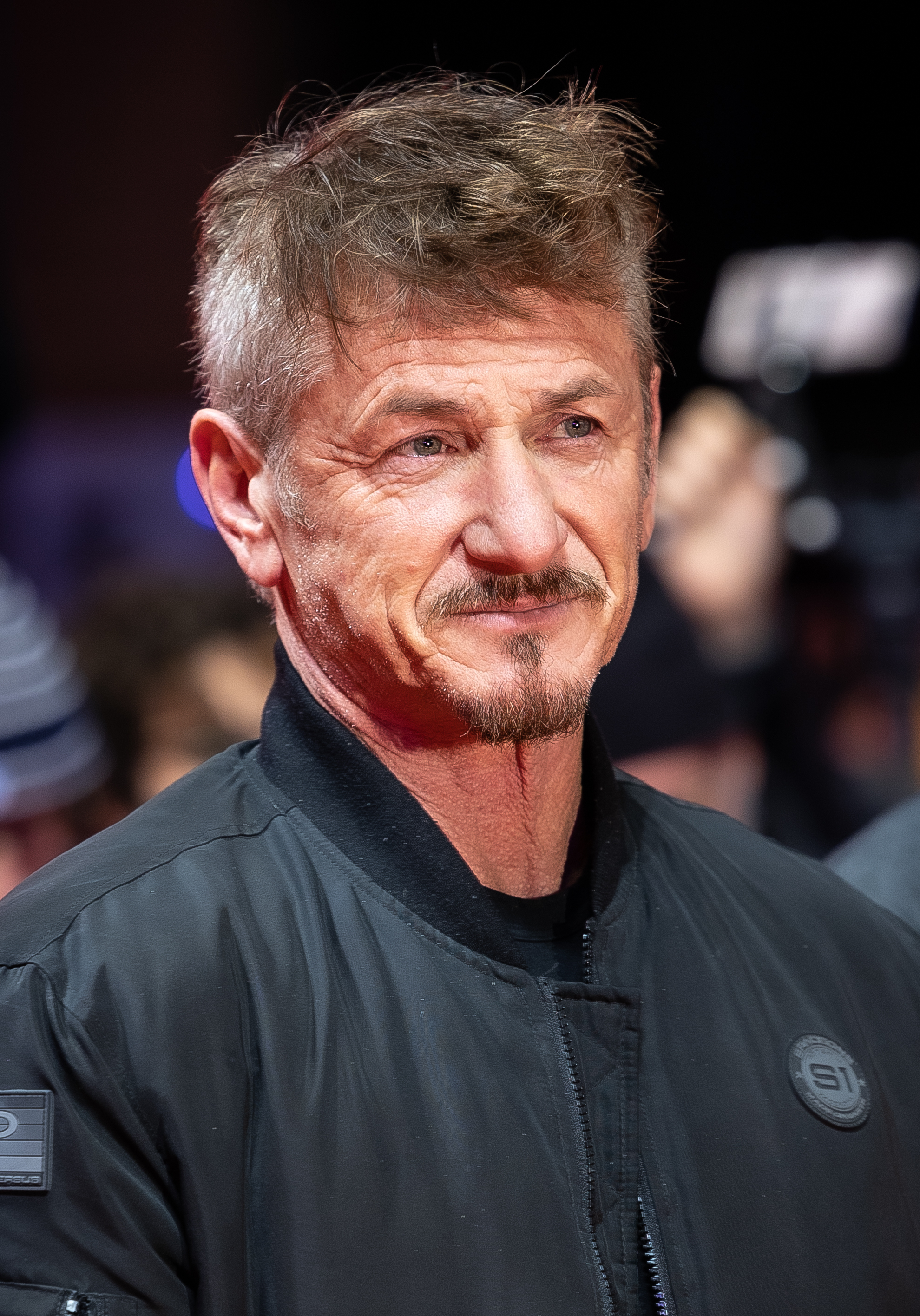
- The 2025 recipient: Sean Penn
- Awarded for: Outstanding Performance by a Male Actor in a Supporting Role in a Motion Picture
- Location: Los Angeles, California
- Presented by: SAG-AFTRA
- First award: Martin Landau for Ed Wood (1994)
- Currently held by: Sean Penn for One Battle After Another (2025)
- Website: sagawards.org

The Actor Award for Outstanding Performance by a Male Actor in a Supporting Role in a Motion Picture (formerly Screen Actors Guild Award for Outstanding Performance by a Male Actor in a Supporting Role) is an award presented annually by the Screen Actors Guild. It has been presented since the 1st Screen Actors Guild Awards in 1995 to a male actor who has delivered an outstanding performance in a supporting role in a film released that year.

The award has been presented 30 times, and 29 actors have won the award. Martin Landau was the award's first winner for Ed Wood (1994). The most recent winner is Sean Penn who won for his performance in One Battle After Another (2025). Mahershala Ali is the only actor to have won the award twice. The record for the most nominations is shared by Chris Cooper, Willem Dafoe, and Jared Leto with three nominations each.

== Winners and nominees ==
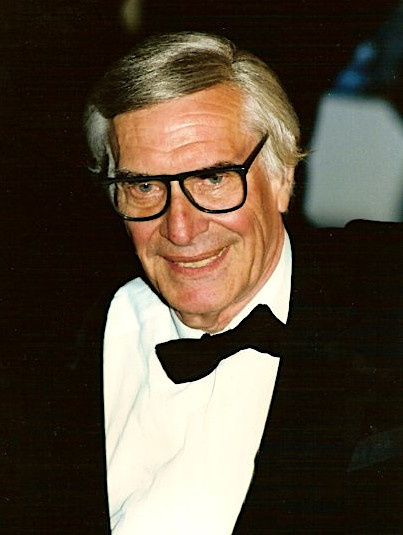
Martin Landau was the award's first winner, for Ed Wood (1994).

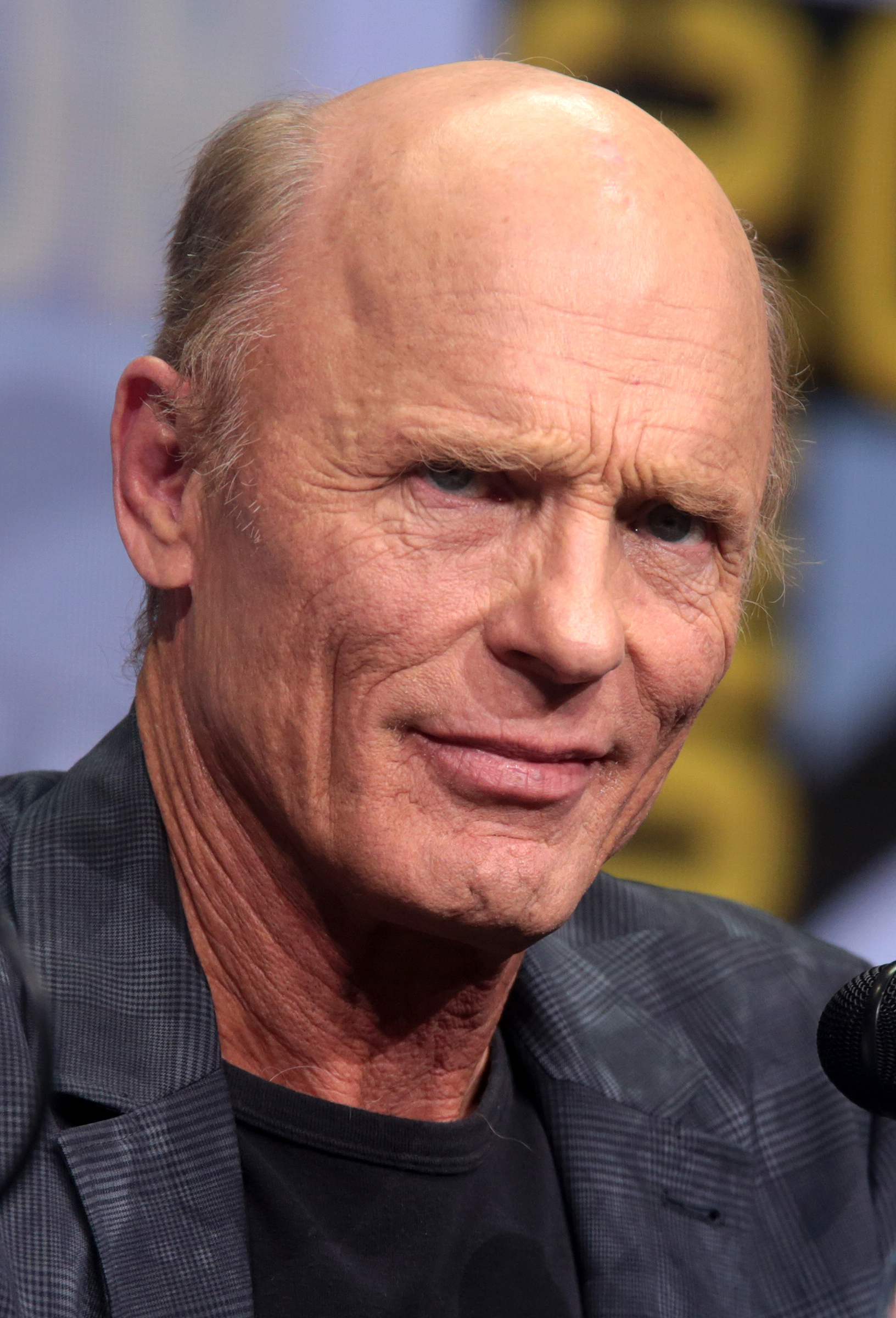
Ed Harris won for Apollo 13 (1995).

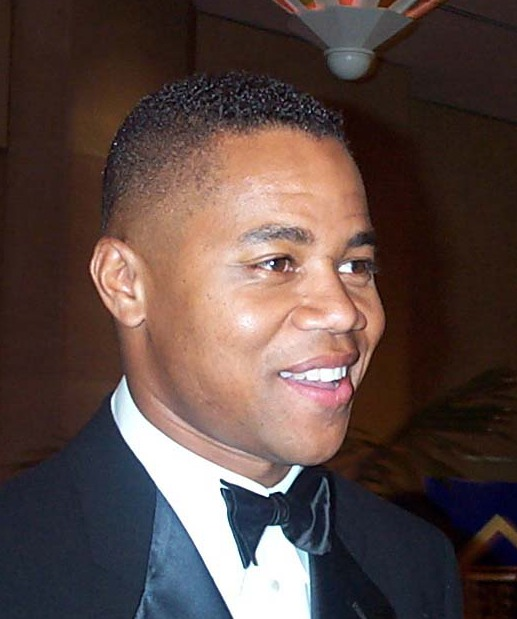
Cuba Gooding Jr. won for Jerry Maguire (1996).

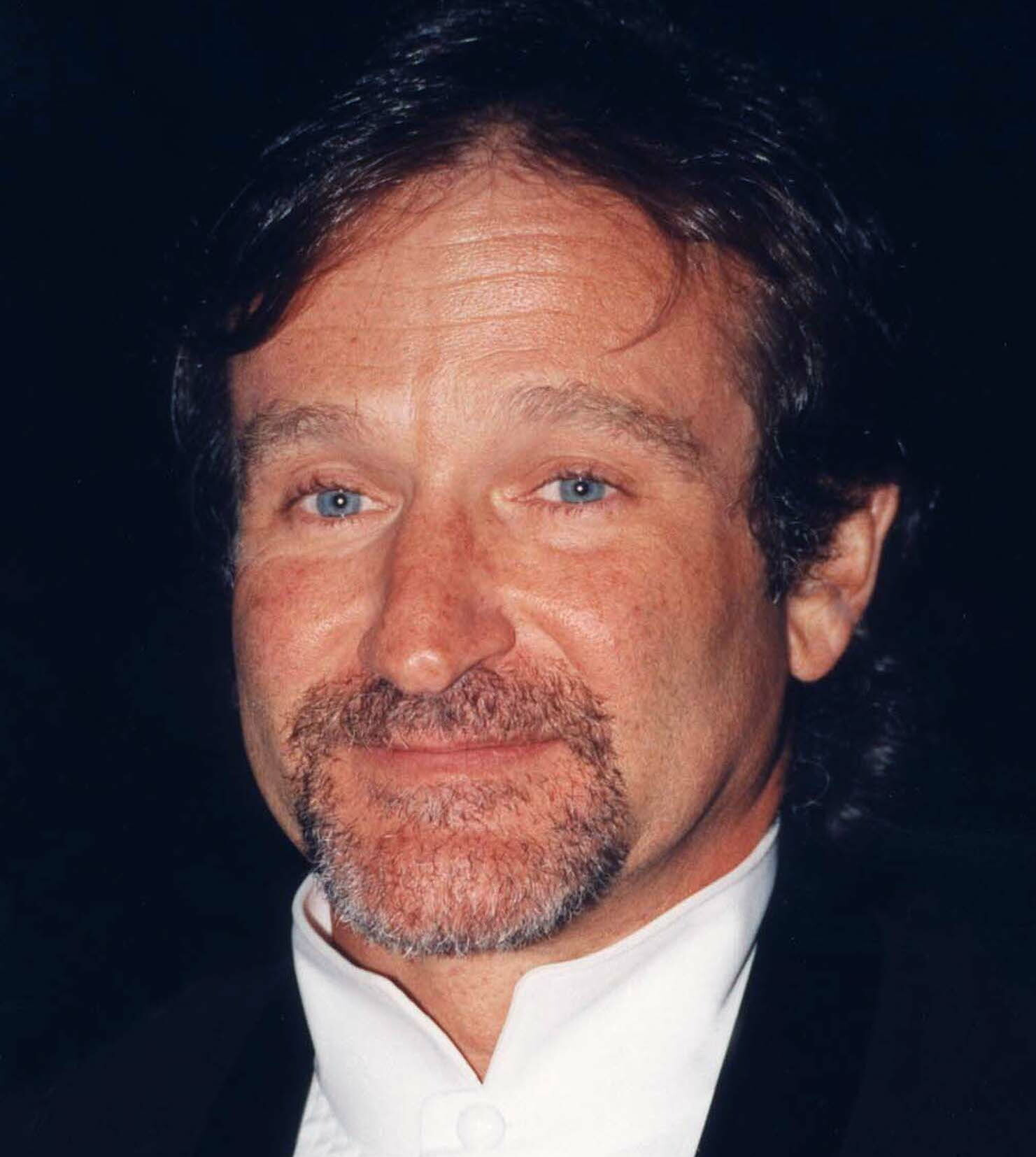
Robin Williams won for Good Will Hunting (1997).

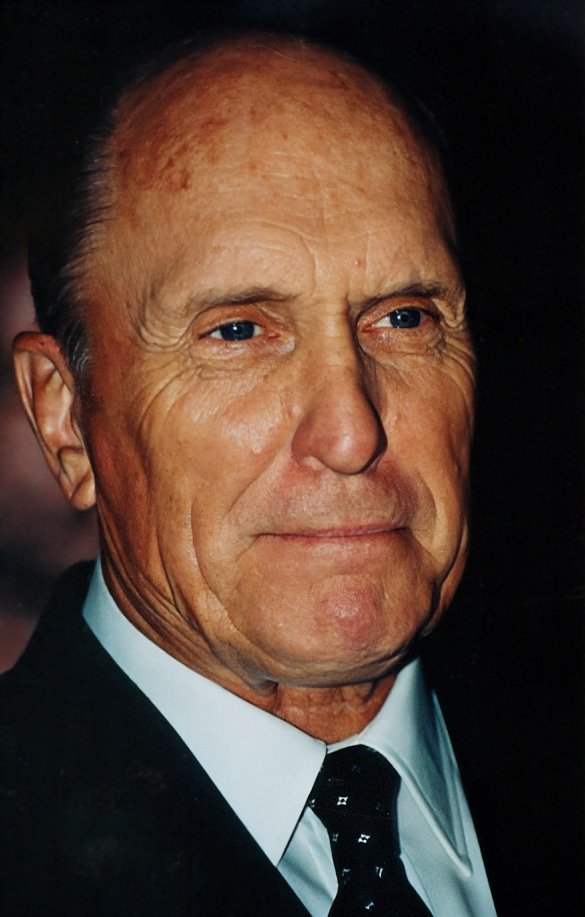
Robert Duvall won for A Civil Action (1998).

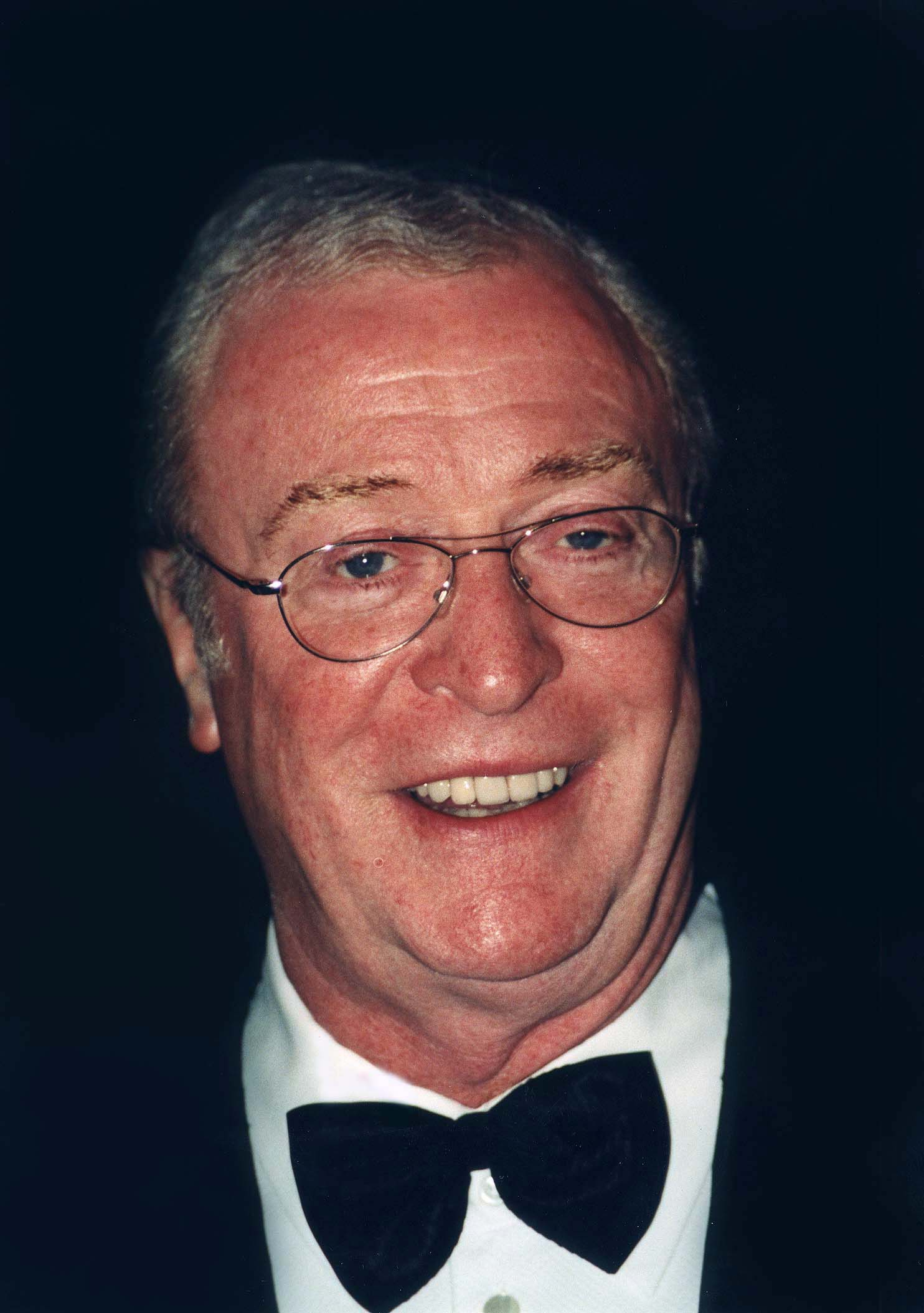
Michael Caine won for The Cider House Rules (1999).

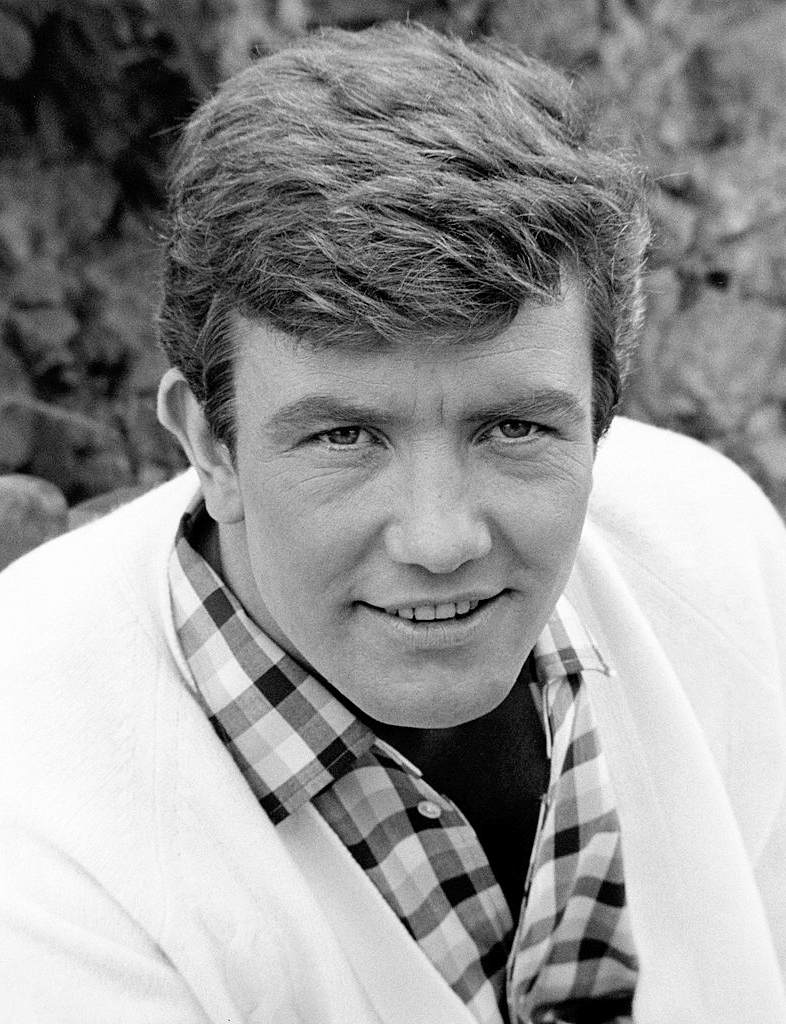
Albert Finney won for Erin Brockovich (2000).

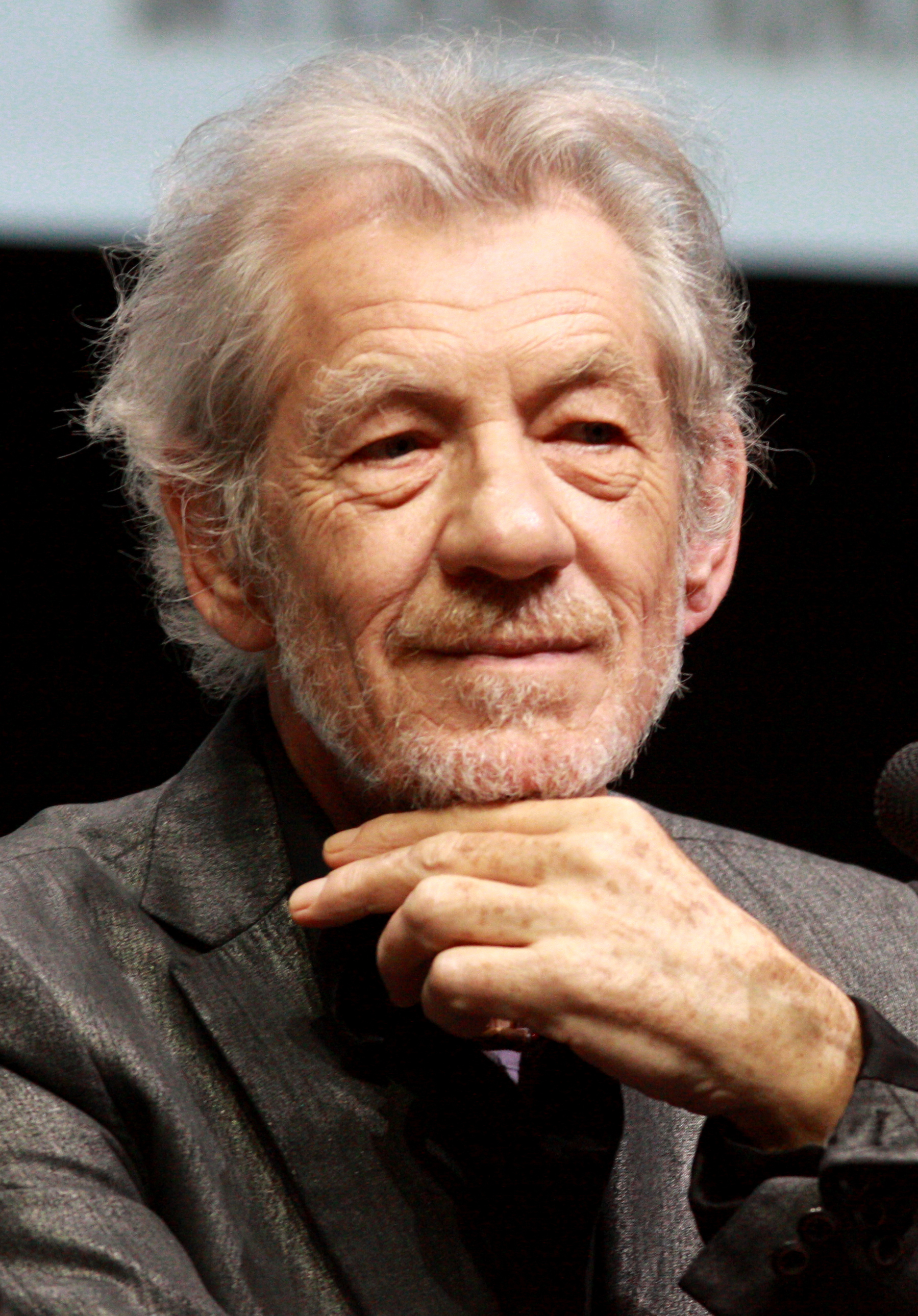
Ian McKellen won for The Lord of the Rings: The Fellowship of the Ring (2001).

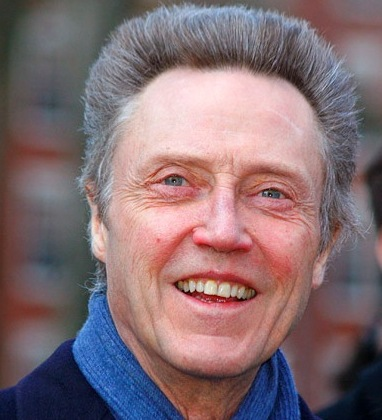
Christopher Walken won for Catch Me If You Can (2002).

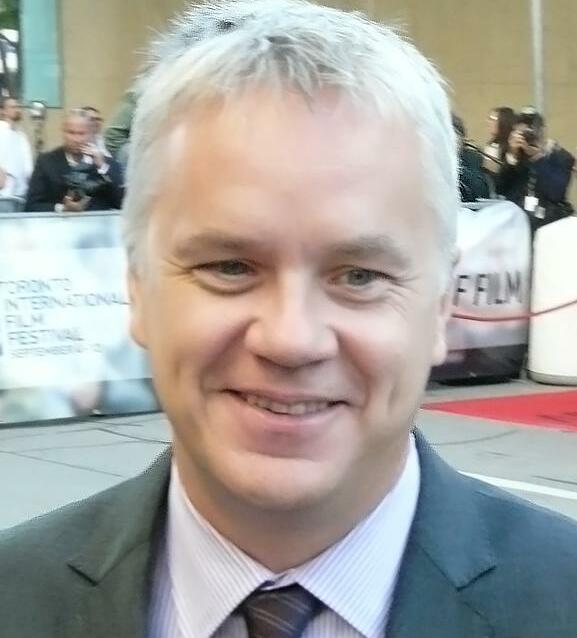
Tim Robbins won for Mystic River (2003).

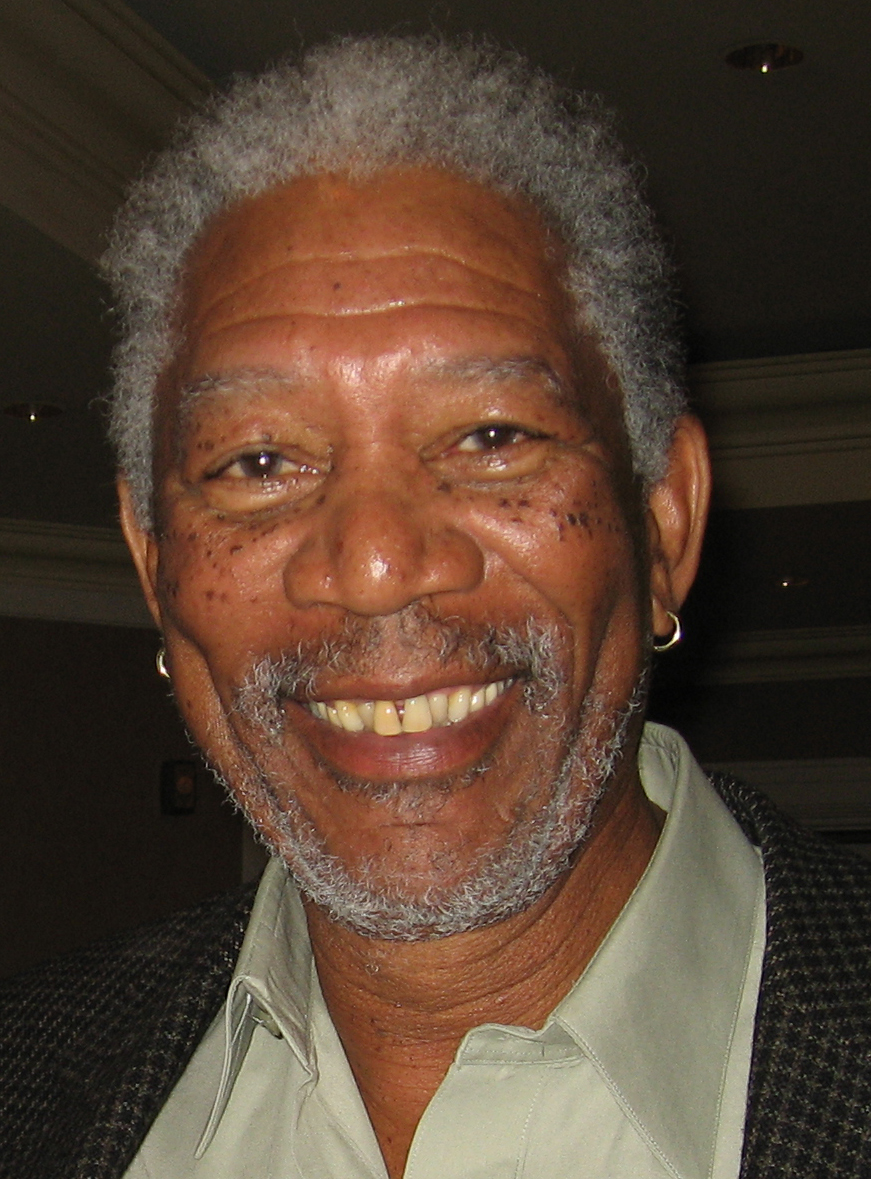
Morgan Freeman won for Million Dollar Baby (2004)

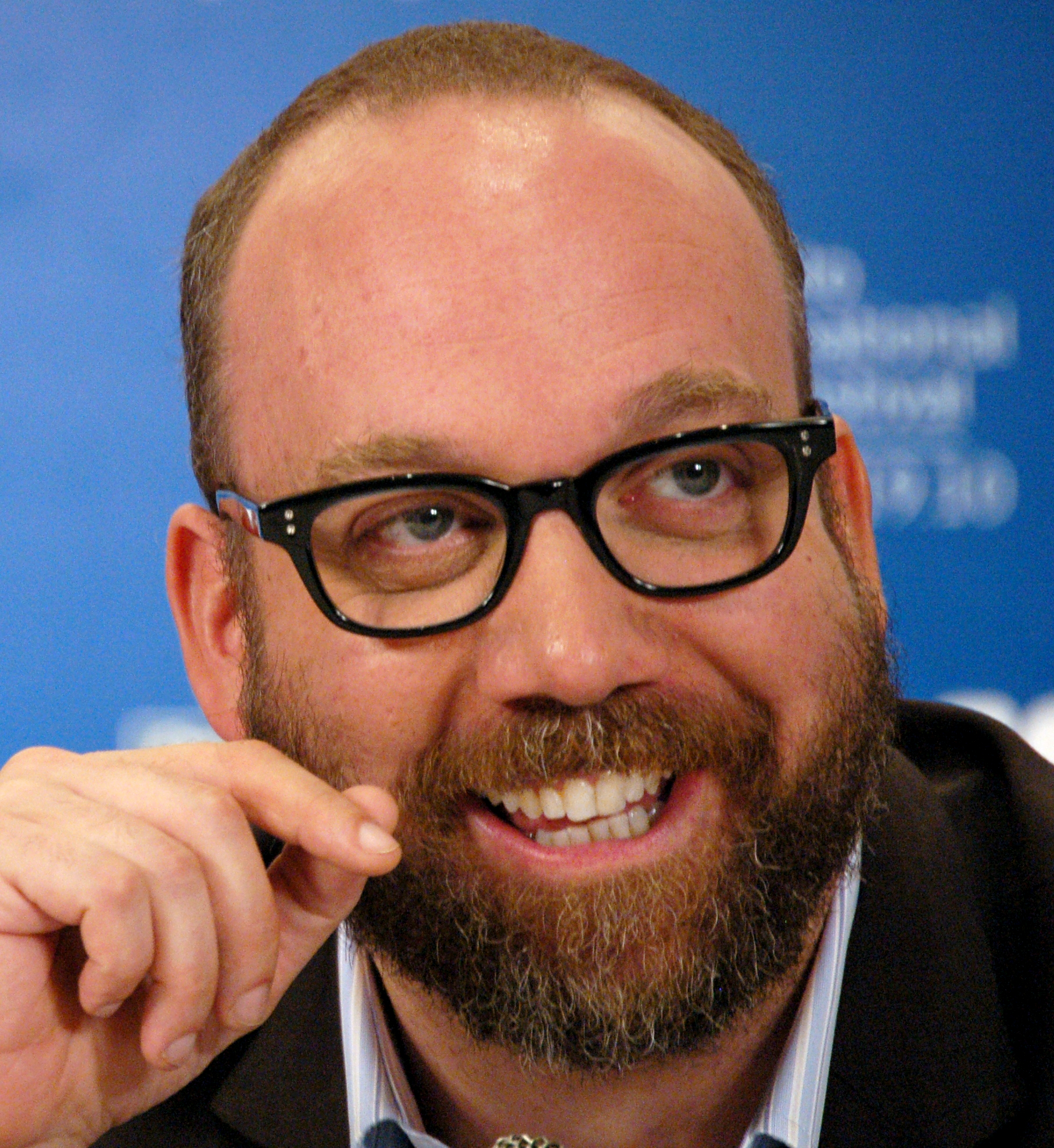
Paul Giamatti won for Cinderella Man (2005).

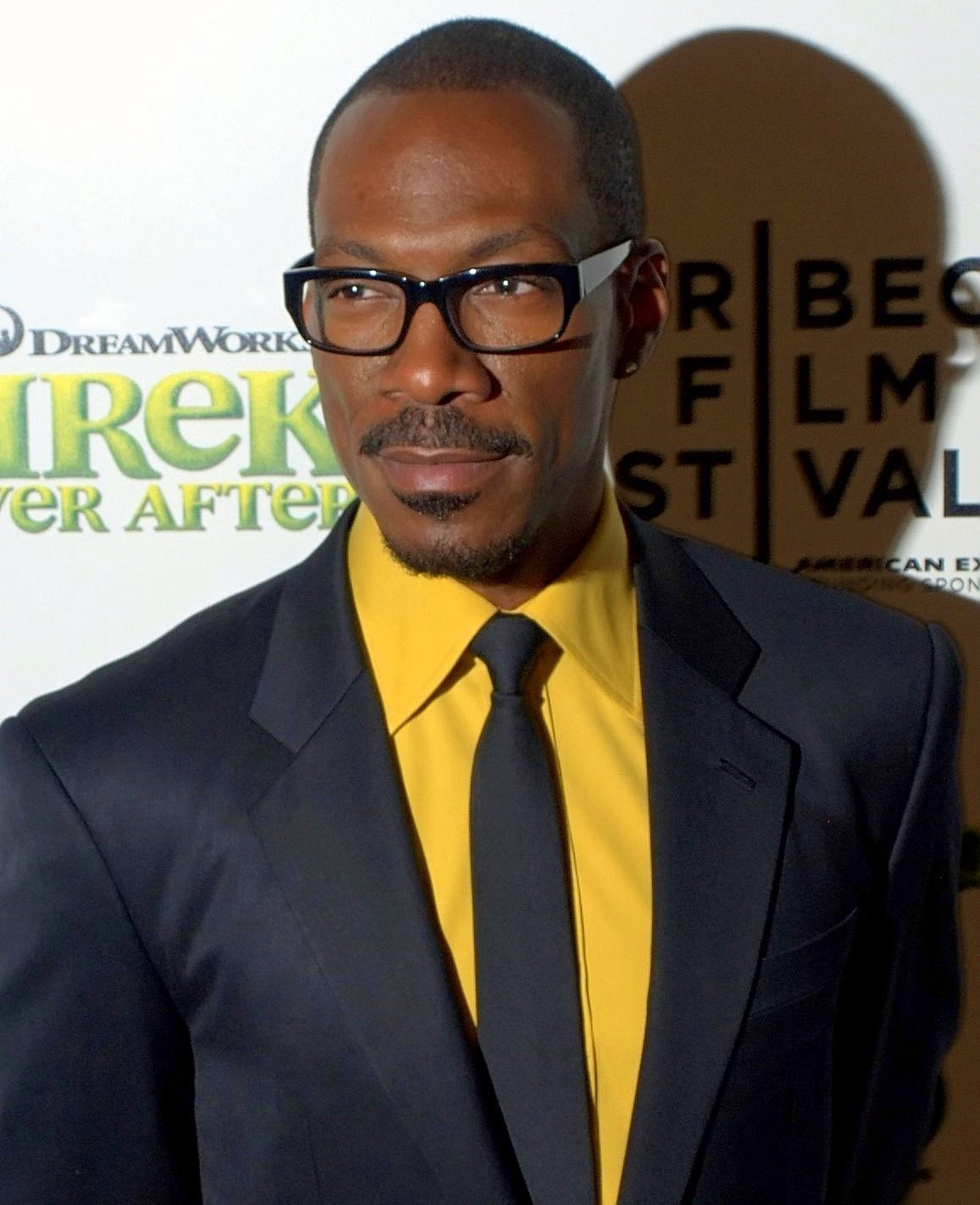
Eddie Murphy won for Dreamgirls (2006).

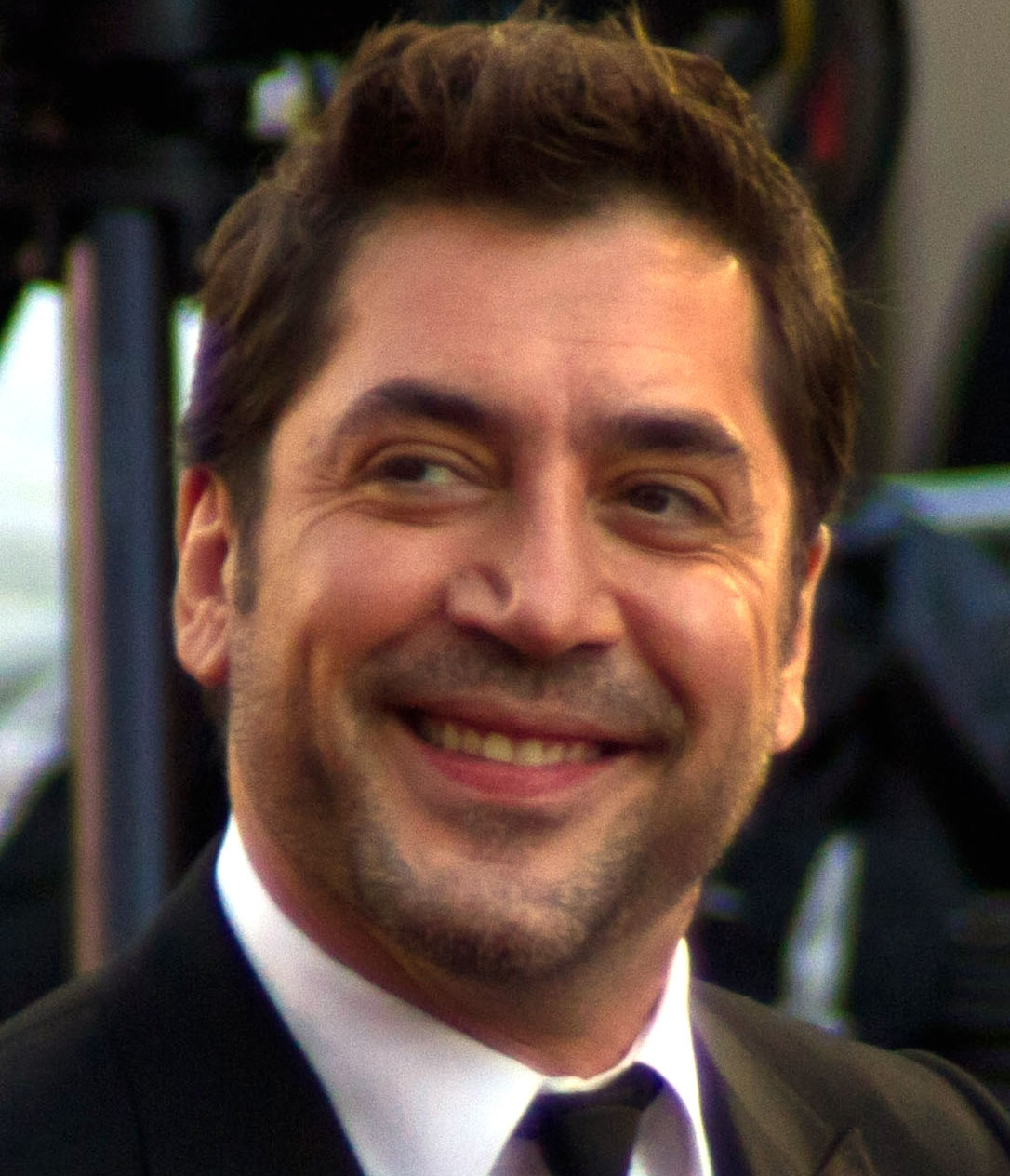
Javier Bardem won for No Country for Old Men (2007).

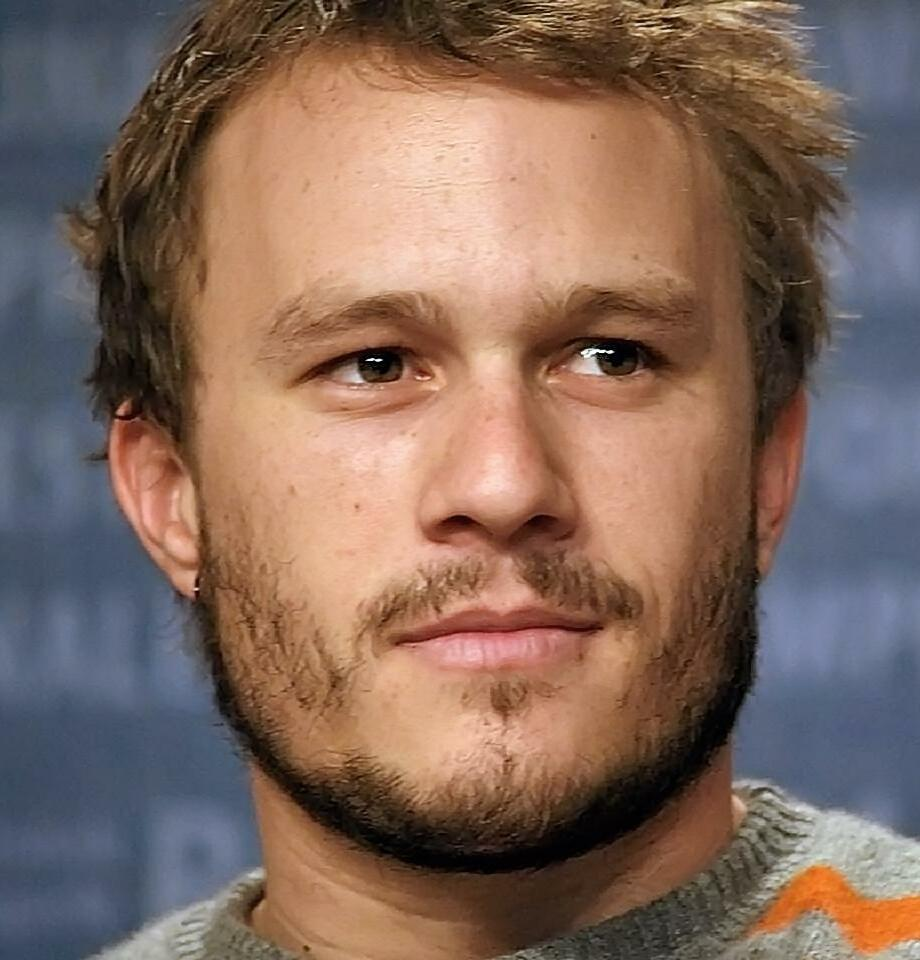
Heath Ledger won posthumously for The Dark Knight (2008).

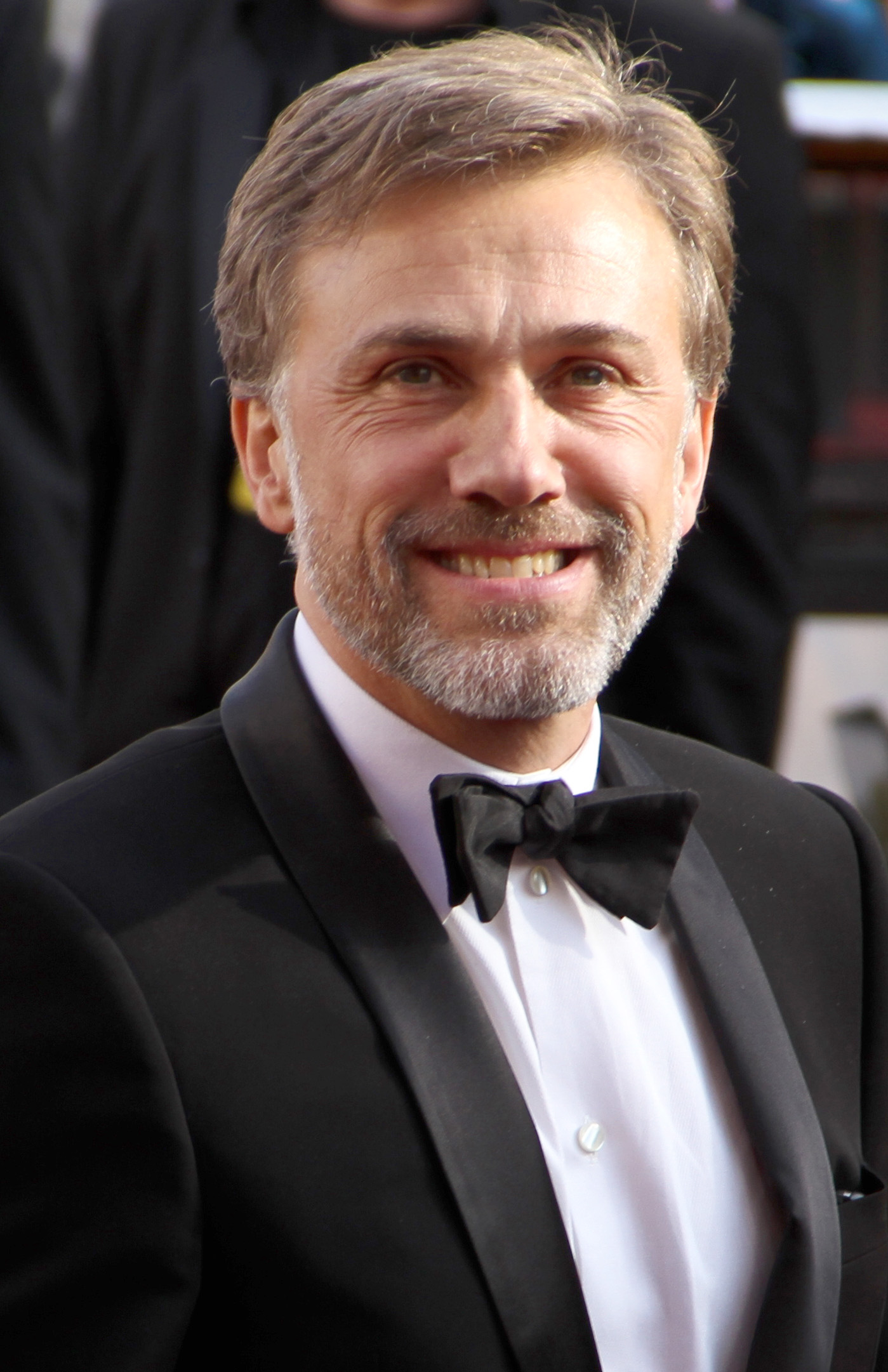
Christoph Waltz won for Inglourious Basterds (2009).

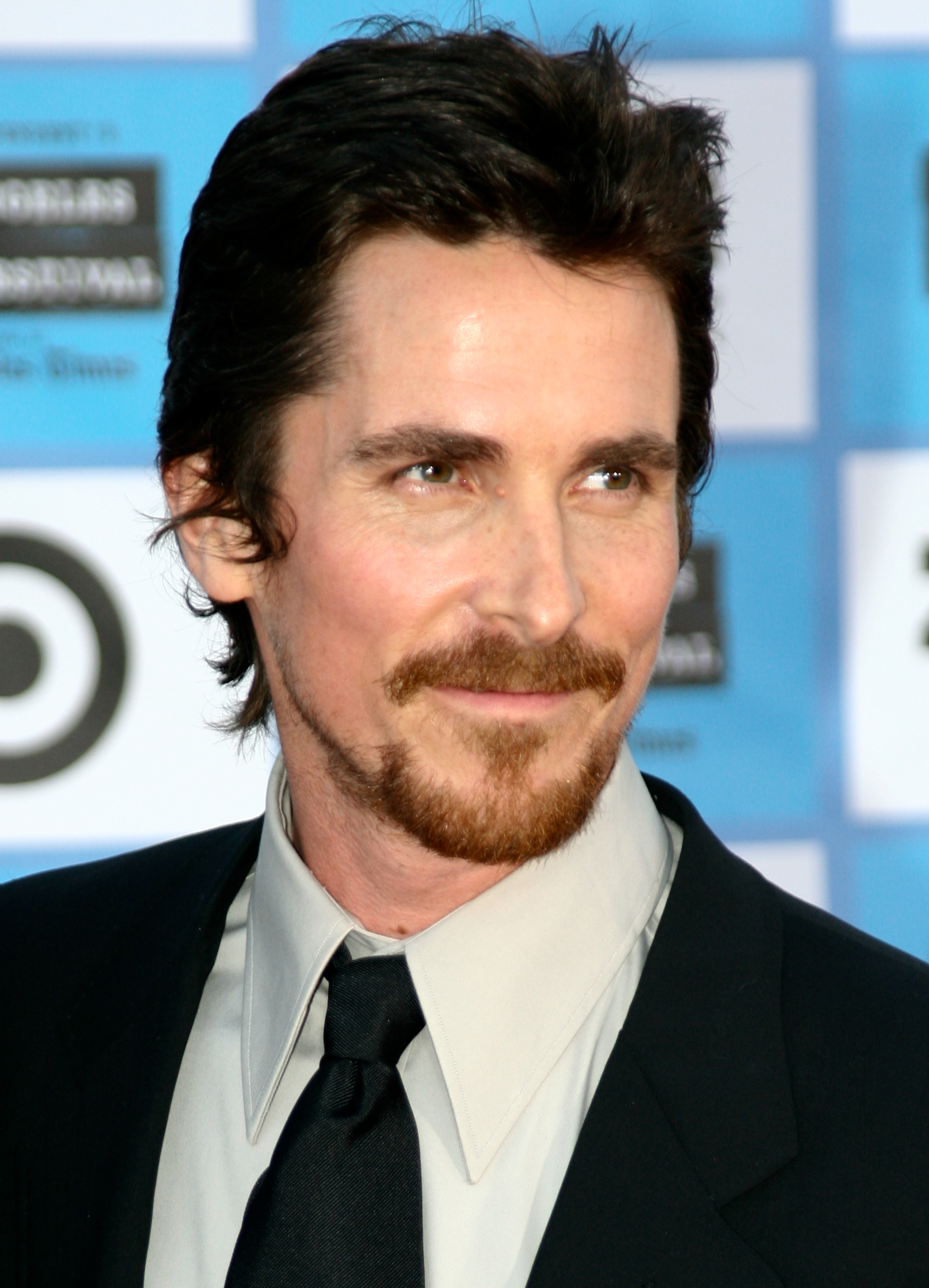
Christian Bale won for The Fighter (2010).

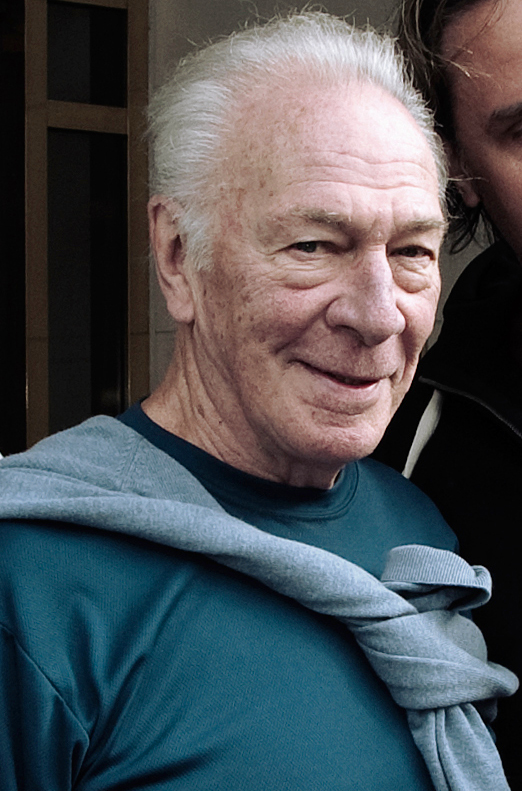
Christopher Plummer won for Beginners (2011).

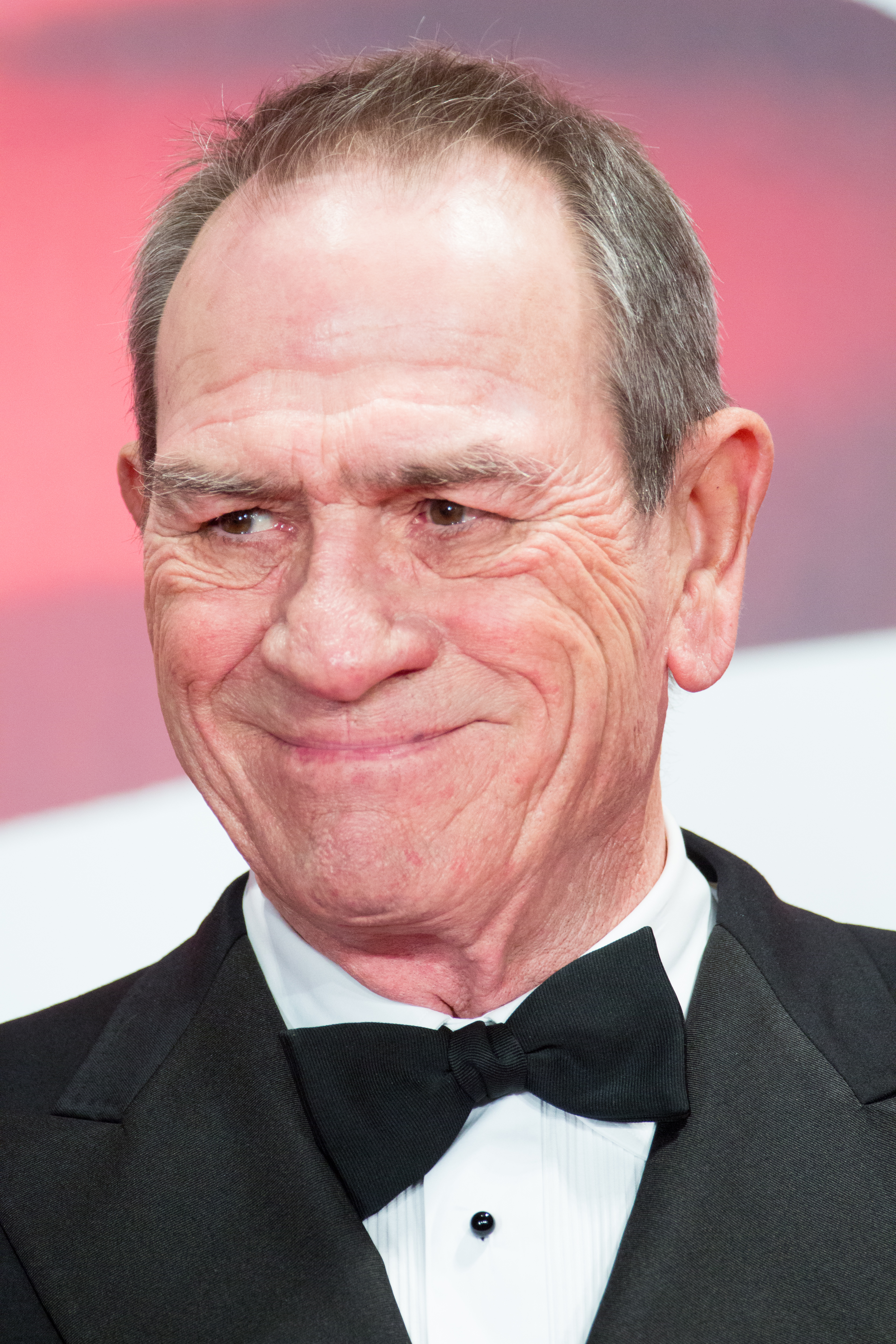
Tommy Lee Jones won for Lincoln (2012).

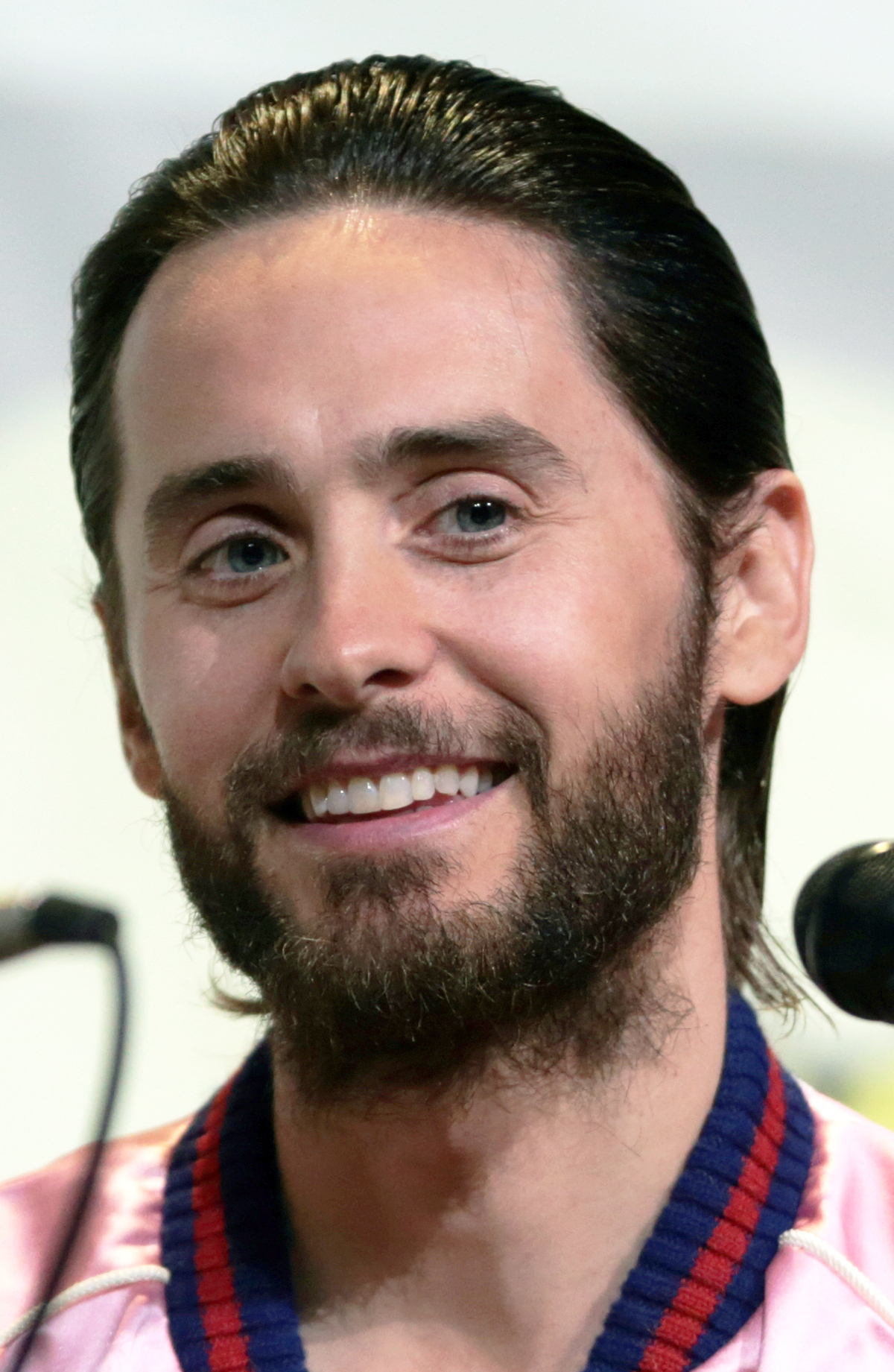
Jared Leto won for Dallas Buyers Club (2013).

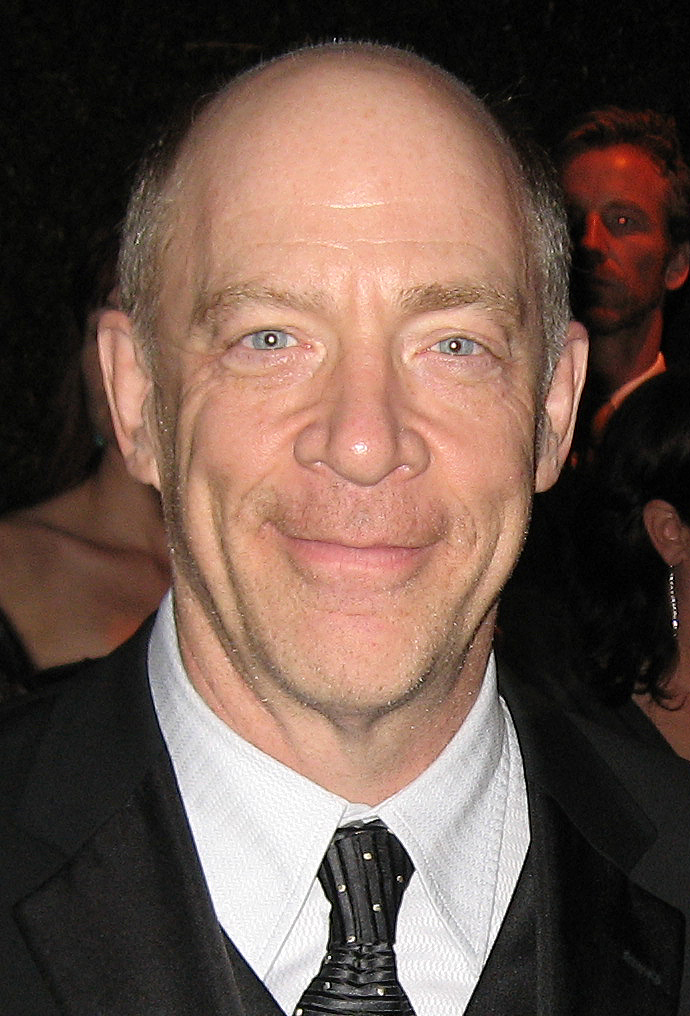
J. K. Simmons won for Whiplash (2014).

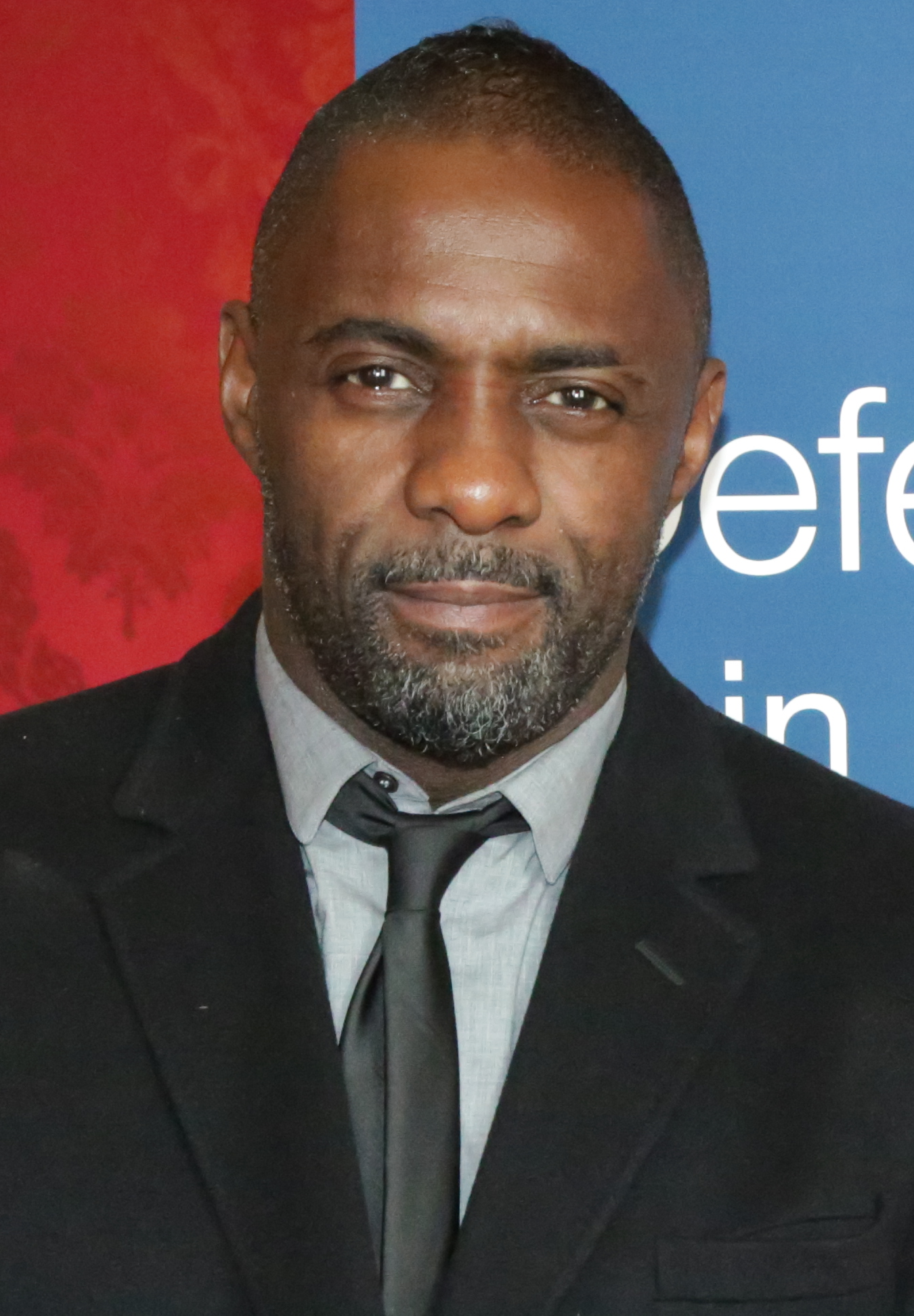
Idris Elba won for Beasts of No Nation (2015).

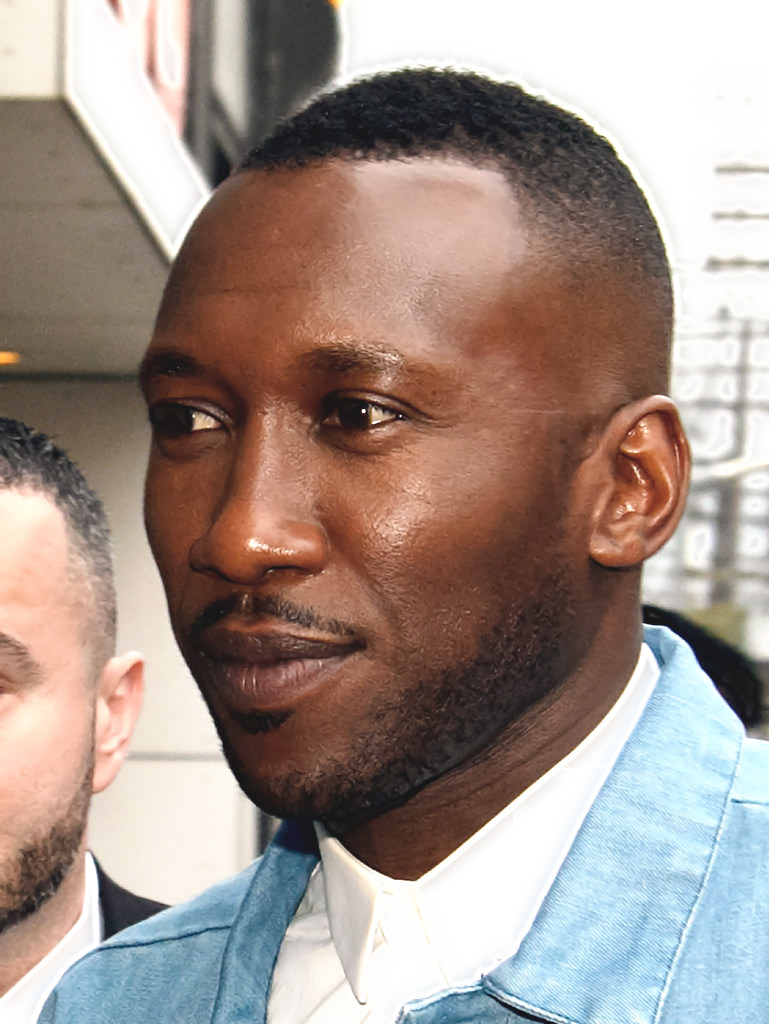
Mahershala Ali won twice, for Moonlight (2016) and Green Book (2018).

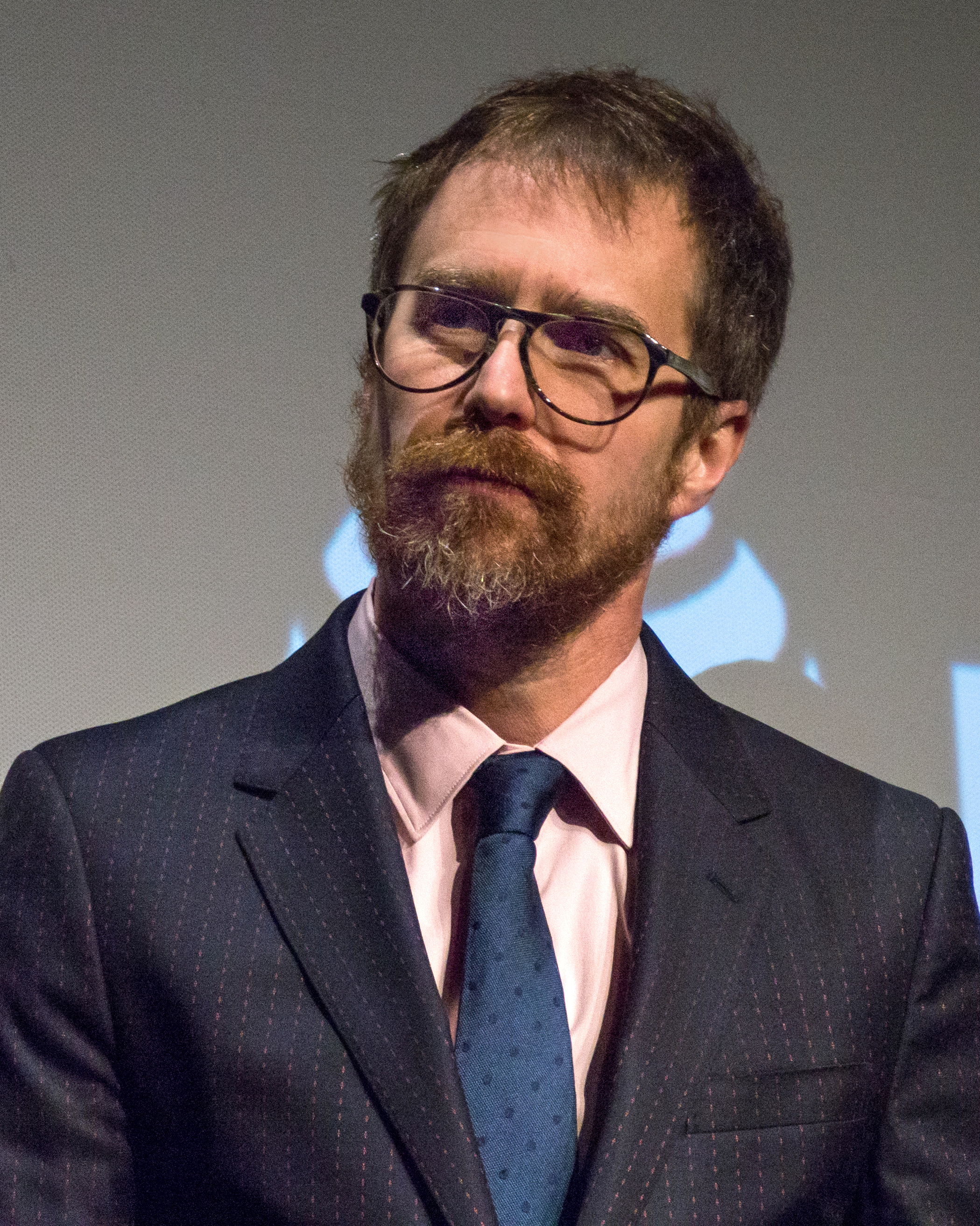
Sam Rockwell won for Three Billboards Outside Ebbing, Missouri (2017).

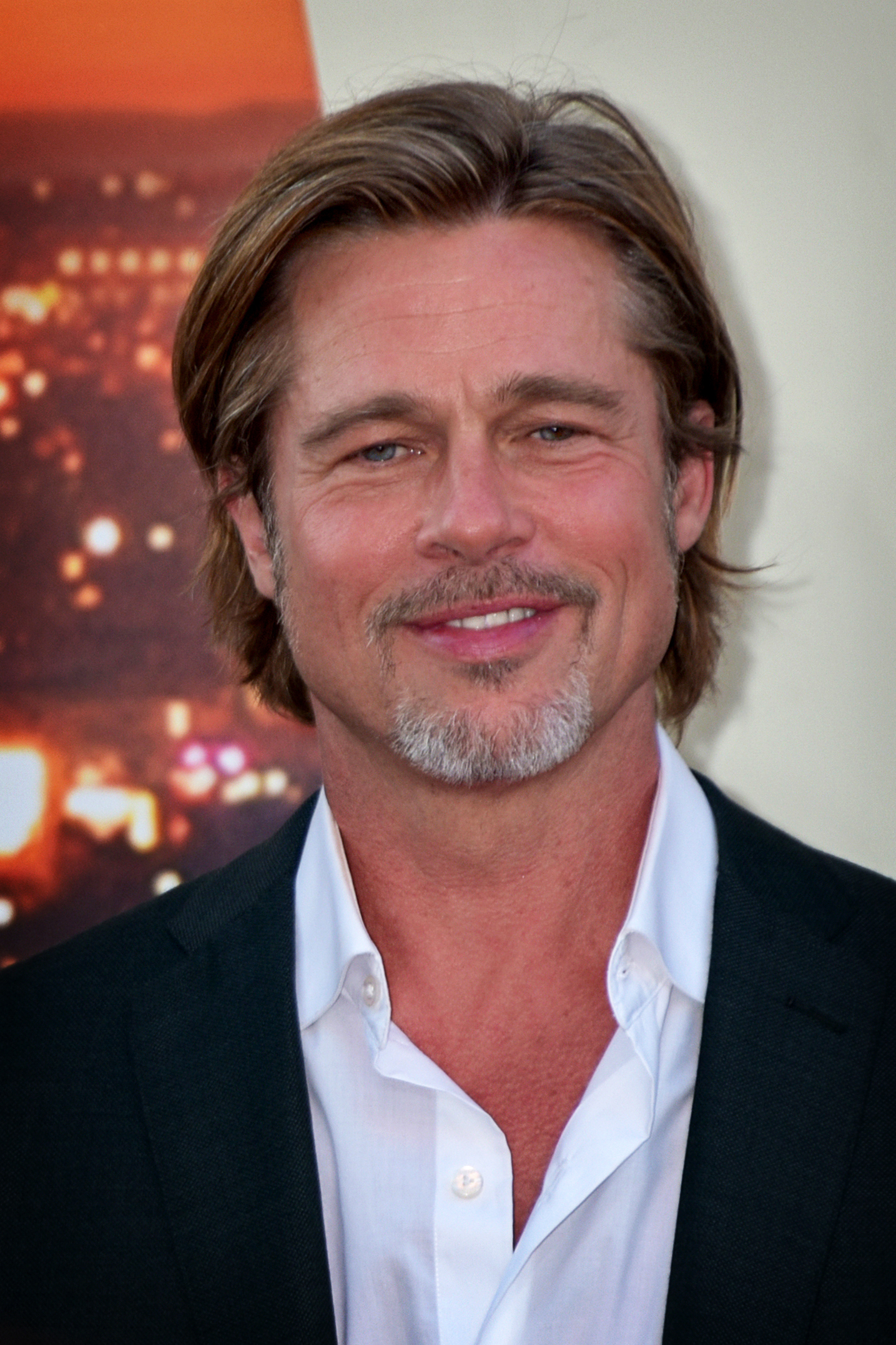
Brad Pitt won for Once Upon a Time in Hollywood (2019).

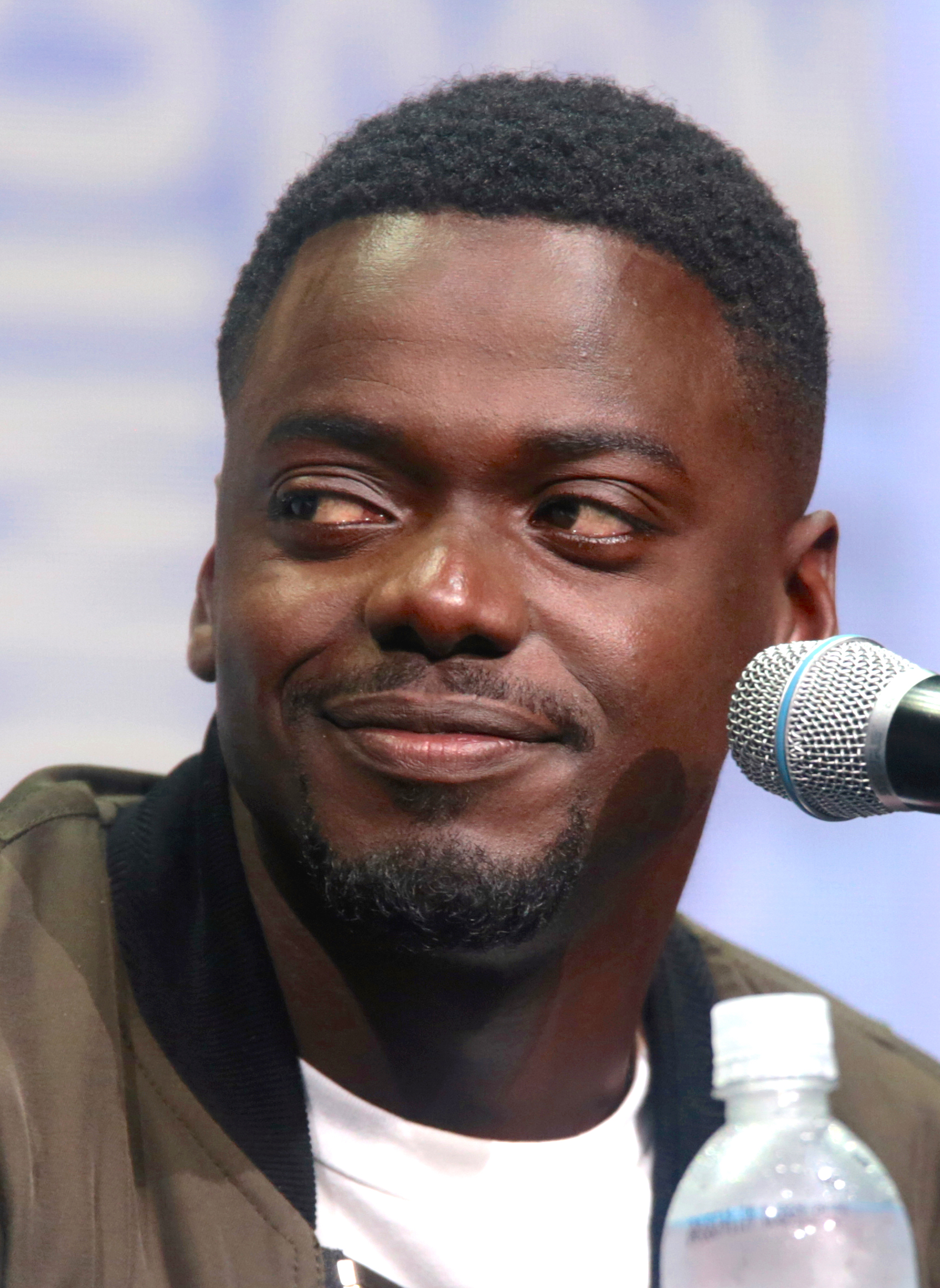
Daniel Kaluuya won for Judas and the Black Messiah (2020).

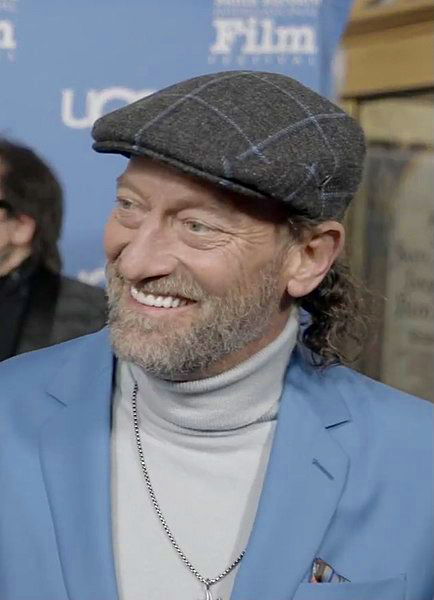
Troy Kotsur won for CODA (2021).

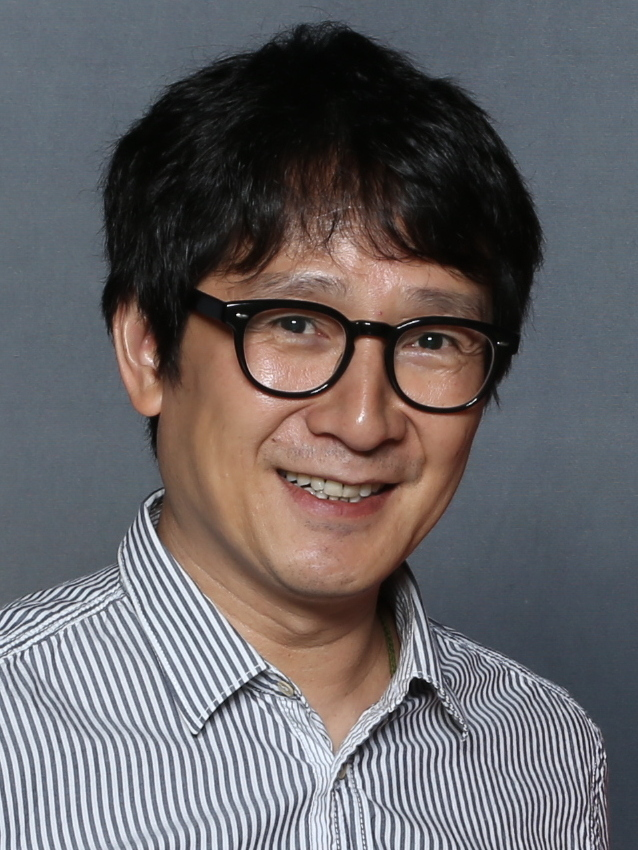
Ke Huy Quan won for Everything Everywhere All at Once (2022).

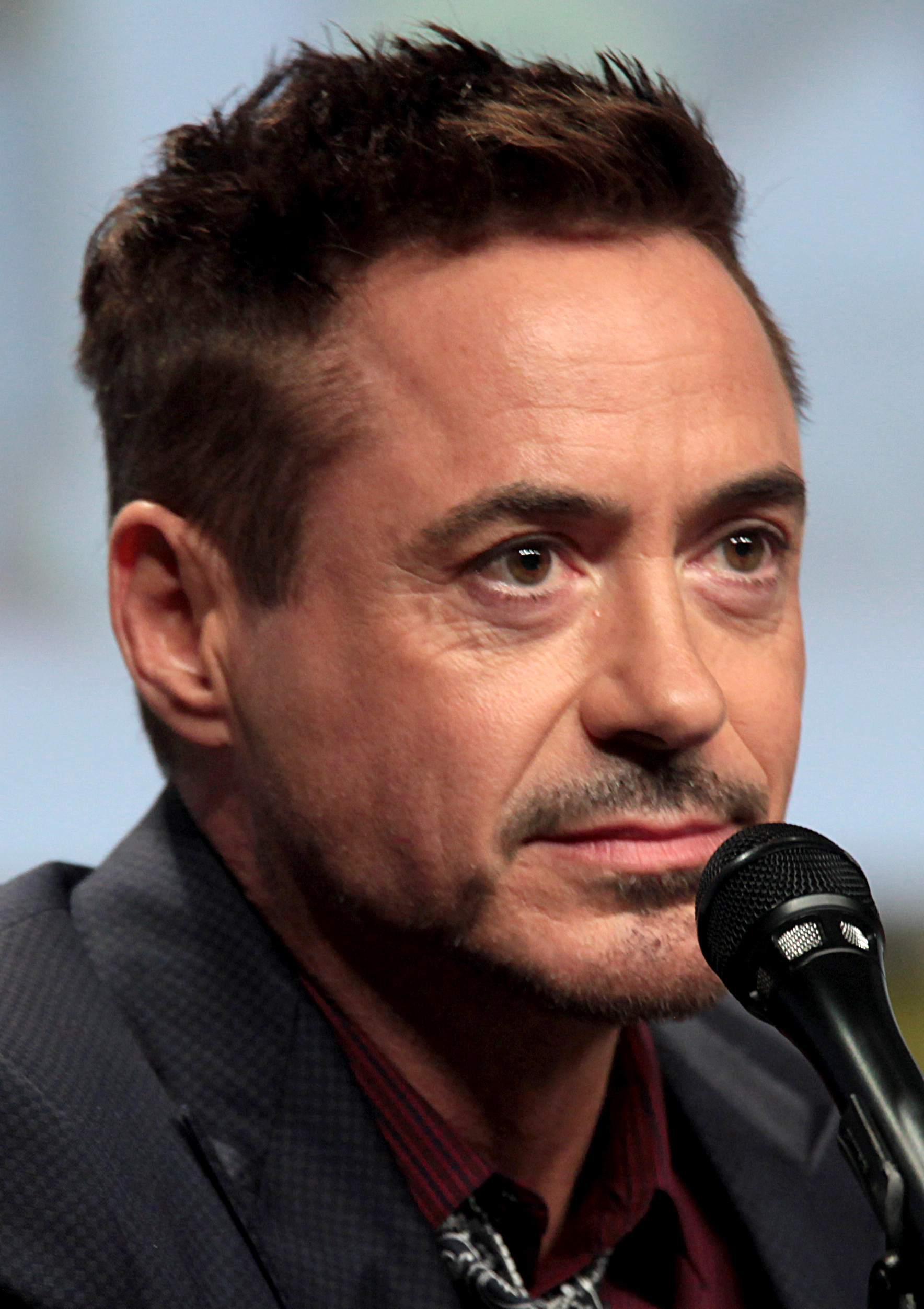
Robert Downey Jr. won for Oppenheimer (2023).

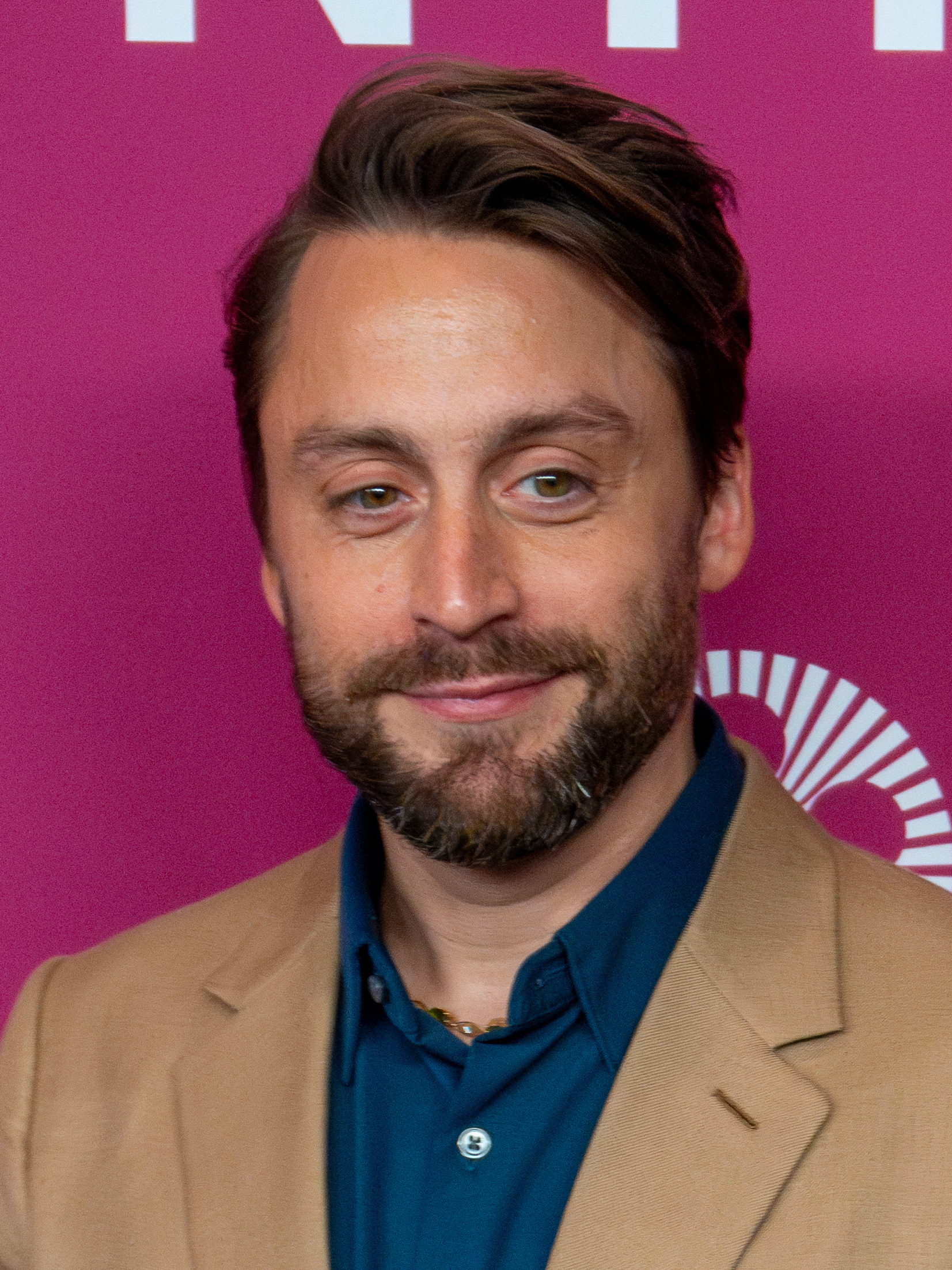
Kieran Culkin won for A Real Pain (2024)

Table key
	Indicates the winner
†	Indicates a posthumous winner
†	Indicates a posthumous nominee
‡	Indicates the Academy Award winner

=== 1990s ===
Year	Actor	Film	Role(s)	Ref.
1994 (1st)	Martin Landau ‡	Ed Wood	Bela Lugosi	
1994 (1st)	Samuel L. Jackson	Pulp Fiction	Jules Winnfield	
1994 (1st)	Chazz Palminteri	Bullets over Broadway	Cheech	
1994 (1st)	Gary Sinise	Forrest Gump	Lt. Dan Taylor	
1994 (1st)	John Turturro	Quiz Show	Herb Stempel	
1995 (2nd)	Ed Harris	Apollo 13	Gene Kranz	
1995 (2nd)	Kevin Bacon	Murder in the First	Henri Young	
1995 (2nd)	Kenneth Branagh	Othello	Iago	
1995 (2nd)	Don Cheadle	Devil in a Blue Dress	Mouse Alexander	
1995 (2nd)	Kevin Spacey ‡	The Usual Suspects	Roger "Verbal" Kint	
1996 (3rd)	Cuba Gooding Jr. ‡	Jerry Maguire	Rod Tidwell	
1996 (3rd)	Hank Azaria	The Birdcage	Agador Spartacus	
1996 (3rd)	Nathan Lane	The Birdcage	Albert Goldman	
1996 (3rd)	William H. Macy	Fargo	Jerry Lundegaard	
1996 (3rd)	Noah Taylor	Shine	David Helfgott – Adolescent	
1997 (4th)	Robin Williams ‡	Good Will Hunting	Sean Maguire	
1997 (4th)	Billy Connolly	Mrs Brown	John Brown	
1997 (4th)	Anthony Hopkins	Amistad	John Quincy Adams	
1997 (4th)	Greg Kinnear	As Good as It Gets	Simon Bishop	
1997 (4th)	Burt Reynolds	Boogie Nights	Jack Horner	
1998 (5th)	Robert Duvall	A Civil Action	Jerome Facher	
1998 (5th)	James Coburn ‡	Affliction	Glen Whitehouse	
1998 (5th)	David Kelly	Waking Ned Devine	Michael O'Sullivan	
1998 (5th)	Geoffrey Rush	Shakespeare in Love	Philip Henslowe	
1998 (5th)	Billy Bob Thornton	A Simple Plan	Jacob Mitchell	
1999 (6th)	Michael Caine ‡	The Cider House Rules	Dr. Wilbur Larch	
1999 (6th)	Chris Cooper	American Beauty	Col. Frank Fitts	
1999 (6th)	Tom Cruise	Magnolia	Frank T.J. Mackey	
1999 (6th)	Michael Clarke Duncan	The Green Mile	John Coffey	
1999 (6th)	Haley Joel Osment	The Sixth Sense	Cole Sear	

=== 2000s ===
Year	Actor	Film	Role(s)	Ref.
2000 (7th)	Albert Finney	Erin Brockovich	Edward L. Masry	
2000 (7th)	Jeff Bridges	The Contender	President Jackson Evans	
2000 (7th)	Willem Dafoe	Shadow of the Vampire	Max Schreck	
2000 (7th)	Gary Oldman	The Contender	Shelly Runyon	
2000 (7th)	Joaquin Phoenix	Gladiator	Commodus	
2001 (8th)	Ian McKellen	The Lord of the Rings: The Fellowship of the Ring	Gandalf	
2001 (8th)	Jim Broadbent ‡	Iris	John Bayley	
2001 (8th)	Hayden Christensen	Life as a House	Sam Monroe	
2001 (8th)	Ethan Hawke	Training Day	Jake Hoyt	
2001 (8th)	Ben Kingsley	Sexy Beast	Don Logan	
2002 (9th)	Christopher Walken	Catch Me If You Can	Frank Abagnale Sr.	
2002 (9th)	Chris Cooper ‡	Adaptation.	John Laroche	
2002 (9th)	Ed Harris	The Hours	Richard Brown	
2002 (9th)	Alfred Molina	Frida	Diego Rivera	
2002 (9th)	Dennis Quaid	Far from Heaven	Frank Whitaker	
2003 (10th)	Tim Robbins ‡	Mystic River	Dave Boyle	
2003 (10th)	Alec Baldwin	The Cooler	Shelly Kaplow	
2003 (10th)	Chris Cooper	Seabiscuit	Tom Smith	
2003 (10th)	Benicio del Toro	21 Grams	Jack Jordan	
2003 (10th)	Ken Watanabe	The Last Samurai	Lord Moritsugu Katsumoto	
2004 (11th)	Morgan Freeman ‡	Million Dollar Baby	Eddie "Scrap-Iron" Dupris	
2004 (11th)	Thomas Haden Church	Sideways	Jack Cole	
2004 (11th)	Jamie Foxx	Collateral	Max Durocher	
2004 (11th)	James Garner	The Notebook	Old Noah Calhoun	
2004 (11th)	Freddie Highmore	Finding Neverland	Peter Llewelyn Davies	
2005 (12th)	Paul Giamatti	Cinderella Man	Joe Gould	
2005 (12th)	Don Cheadle	Crash	Det. Graham Waters	
2005 (12th)	Matt Dillon	Crash	Sgt. John Ryan	
2005 (12th)	George Clooney ‡	Syriana	Bob Barnes	
2005 (12th)	Jake Gyllenhaal	Brokeback Mountain	Jack Twist	
2006 (13th)	Eddie Murphy	Dreamgirls	James "Thunder" Early	
2006 (13th)	Alan Arkin ‡	Little Miss Sunshine	Edwin Hoover	
2006 (13th)	Leonardo DiCaprio	The Departed	William "Billy" Costigan, Jr.	
2006 (13th)	Jackie Earle Haley	Little Children	Ronald "Ronnie" McGorvey	
2006 (13th)	Djimon Hounsou	Blood Diamond	Solomon Vandy	
2007 (14th)	Javier Bardem ‡	No Country for Old Men	Anton Chigurh	
2007 (14th)	Casey Affleck	The Assassination of Jesse James by the Coward Robert Ford	Robert Ford	
2007 (14th)	Hal Holbrook	Into the Wild	Ron Franz	
2007 (14th)	Tommy Lee Jones	No Country for Old Men	Ed Tom Bell	
2007 (14th)	Tom Wilkinson	Michael Clayton	Arthur Edens	
2008 (15th)	Heath Ledger † ‡	The Dark Knight	Joker	
2008 (15th)	Josh Brolin	Milk	Dan White	
2008 (15th)	Robert Downey Jr.	Tropic Thunder	Kirk Lazarus	
2008 (15th)	Philip Seymour Hoffman	Doubt	Father Brendan Flynn	
2008 (15th)	Dev Patel	Slumdog Millionaire	Jamal Malik	
2009 (16th)	Christoph Waltz ‡	Inglourious Basterds	Col. Hans Landa	
2009 (16th)	Matt Damon	Invictus	Francois Pienaar	
2009 (16th)	Woody Harrelson	The Messenger	Captain Tony Stone	
2009 (16th)	Christopher Plummer	The Last Station	Leo Tolstoy	
2009 (16th)	Stanley Tucci	The Lovely Bones	George Harvey	

=== 2010s ===
Year	Actor	Film	Role(s)	Ref.
2010 (17th)	Christian Bale ‡	The Fighter	Dicky Eklund	
2010 (17th)	John Hawkes	Winter's Bone	Teardrop Dolly	
2010 (17th)	Jeremy Renner	The Town	James "Jem" Coughlin	
2010 (17th)	Mark Ruffalo	The Kids Are All Right	Paul Hatfield	
2010 (17th)	Geoffrey Rush	The King's Speech	Lionel Logue	
2011 (18th)	Christopher Plummer ‡	Beginners	Hal Fields	
2011 (18th)	Kenneth Branagh	My Week with Marilyn	Laurence Olivier	
2011 (18th)	Armie Hammer	J. Edgar	Clyde Tolson	
2011 (18th)	Jonah Hill	Moneyball	Peter Brand	
2011 (18th)	Nick Nolte	Warrior	Paddy Conlon	
2012 (19th)	Tommy Lee Jones	Lincoln	Thaddeus Stevens	
2012 (19th)	Alan Arkin	Argo	Lester Siegel	
2012 (19th)	Javier Bardem	Skyfall	Raoul Silva	
2012 (19th)	Robert De Niro	Silver Linings Playbook	Patrizio "Pat" Solitano, Sr.	
2012 (19th)	Philip Seymour Hoffman	The Master	Lancaster Dodd	
2013 (20th)	Jared Leto ‡	Dallas Buyers Club	Rayon	
2013 (20th)	Barkhad Abdi	Captain Phillips	Abduwali Muse	
2013 (20th)	Daniel Brühl	Rush	Niki Lauda	
2013 (20th)	Michael Fassbender	12 Years a Slave	Edwin Epps	
2013 (20th)	James Gandolfini †	Enough Said	Albert	
2014 (21st)	J. K. Simmons ‡	Whiplash	Terrence Fletcher	
2014 (21st)	Robert Duvall	The Judge	Judge Joseph Palmer	
2014 (21st)	Ethan Hawke	Boyhood	Mason Evans Sr.	
2014 (21st)	Edward Norton	Birdman	Mike Shiner	
2014 (21st)	Mark Ruffalo	Foxcatcher	Dave Schultz	
2015 (22nd)	Idris Elba	Beasts of No Nation	Commandant	
2015 (22nd)	Christian Bale	The Big Short	Michael Burry	
2015 (22nd)	Mark Rylance ‡	Bridge of Spies	Rudolf Abel	
2015 (22nd)	Michael Shannon	99 Homes	Rick Carver	
2015 (22nd)	Jacob Tremblay	Room	Jack Newsome	
2016 (23rd)	Mahershala Ali ‡	Moonlight	Juan	
2016 (23rd)	Jeff Bridges	Hell or High Water	Marcus Hamilton	
2016 (23rd)	Hugh Grant	Florence Foster Jenkins	St. Clair Bayfield	
2016 (23rd)	Lucas Hedges	Manchester by the Sea	Patrick Chandler	
2016 (23rd)	Dev Patel	Lion	Saroo Brierley	
2017 (24th)	Sam Rockwell ‡	Three Billboards Outside Ebbing, Missouri	Jason Dixon	
2017 (24th)	Steve Carell	Battle of the Sexes	Bobby Riggs	
2017 (24th)	Willem Dafoe	The Florida Project	Bobby Hicks	
2017 (24th)	Woody Harrelson	Three Billboards Outside Ebbing, Missouri	Sheriff William Willoughby	
2017 (24th)	Richard Jenkins	The Shape of Water	Giles	
2018 (25th)	Mahershala Ali ‡	Green Book	Don Shirley	
2018 (25th)	Timothée Chalamet	Beautiful Boy	Nic Sheff	
2018 (25th)	Adam Driver	BlacKkKlansman	Detective Philip "Flip" Zimmerman	
2018 (25th)	Sam Elliott	A Star Is Born	Bobby Maine	
2018 (25th)	Richard E. Grant	Can You Ever Forgive Me?	Jack Hock	
2019 (26th)	Brad Pitt ‡	Once Upon a Time in Hollywood	Cliff Booth	
2019 (26th)	Jamie Foxx	Just Mercy	Walter McMillian	
2019 (26th)	Tom Hanks	A Beautiful Day in the Neighborhood	Fred Rogers	
2019 (26th)	Al Pacino	The Irishman	Jimmy Hoffa	
2019 (26th)	Joe Pesci	The Irishman	Russell Bufalino	

=== 2020s ===
Year	Actor	Film	Role(s)	Ref.
2020 (27th)	Daniel Kaluuya ‡	Judas and the Black Messiah	Fred Hampton	
2020 (27th)	Sacha Baron Cohen	The Trial of the Chicago 7	Abbie Hoffman	
2020 (27th)	Chadwick Boseman †	Da 5 Bloods	Norman Earl Holloway	
2020 (27th)	Jared Leto	The Little Things	Albert Sparma	
2020 (27th)	Leslie Odom Jr.	One Night in Miami...	Sam Cooke	
2021 (28th)	Troy Kotsur ‡	CODA	Frank Rossi	
2021 (28th)	Ben Affleck	The Tender Bar	Charlie Maguire	
2021 (28th)	Bradley Cooper	Licorice Pizza	Jon Peters	
2021 (28th)	Jared Leto	House of Gucci	Paolo Gucci	
2021 (28th)	Kodi Smit-McPhee	The Power of the Dog	Peter Gordon	
2022 (29th)	Ke Huy Quan ‡	Everything Everywhere All at Once	Waymond Wang	
2022 (29th)	Paul Dano	The Fabelmans	Burt Fabelman	
2022 (29th)	Brendan Gleeson	The Banshees of Inisherin	Colm Doherty	
2022 (29th)	Barry Keoghan	The Banshees of Inisherin	Dominic Kearney	
2022 (29th)	Eddie Redmayne	The Good Nurse	Charles Cullen	
2023 (30th)	Robert Downey Jr. ‡	Oppenheimer	Lewis Strauss	
2023 (30th)	Sterling K. Brown	American Fiction	Clifford "Cliff" Ellison	
2023 (30th)	Willem Dafoe	Poor Things	Dr. Godwin Baxter	
2023 (30th)	Robert De Niro	Killers of the Flower Moon	William King Hale	
2023 (30th)	Ryan Gosling	Barbie	Ken	
2024 (31st)	Kieran Culkin ‡	A Real Pain	Benji Kaplan	
2024 (31st)	Jonathan Bailey	Wicked	Fiyero	
2024 (31st)	Yura Borisov	Anora	Igor	
2024 (31st)	Edward Norton	A Complete Unknown	Pete Seeger	
2024 (31st)	Jeremy Strong	The Apprentice	Roy Cohn	
2025 (32nd)	Sean Penn ‡	One Battle After Another	Col. Steven J. Lockjaw	
2025 (32nd)	Miles Caton	Sinners	Samuel "Sammie" Moore	
2025 (32nd)	Benicio del Toro	One Battle After Another	Sensei Sergio St. Carlos	
2025 (32nd)	Jacob Elordi	Frankenstein	The Creature	
2025 (32nd)	Paul Mescal	Hamnet	William Shakespeare	

== Superlatives ==
Superlative	Leading Actor		Supporting Actor		Overall	
Actor with most awards	Daniel Day-Lewis	3	Mahershala Ali	2	Daniel Day-Lewis	3
Actor with most nominations	Leonardo DiCaprio, Denzel Washington	6	Chris Cooper, Willem Dafoe, Jared Leto	3	Leonardo DiCaprio	7
Actor with most nominations without ever winning	George Clooney, Bradley Cooper, Ryan Gosling, Viggo Mortensen	3	Chris Cooper, Willem Dafoe	3	George Clooney, Ryan Gosling	4
Film with most nominations	The Shawshank Redemption	2	The Banshees of Inisherin, The Birdcage, The Contender, Crash, The Irishman, No Country for Old Men, One Battle After Another, Three Billboards Outside Ebbing, Missouri	2	The Banshees of Inisherin, One Battle After Another	3
Oldest winner	Denzel Washington (Fences, 2017)	62	Christopher Plummer (Beginners, 2012)	82	Christopher Plummer (Beginners, 2012)	82
Oldest nominee	Anthony Hopkins (The Father, 2021)	83	Robert Duvall (The Judge, 2015)	83	Robert Duvall (The Judge, 2015)	83
Youngest winner	Timothée Chalamet (A Complete Unknown, 2024)	29	Heath Ledger (The Dark Knight, 2009)	28	Heath Ledger (The Dark Knight, 2009)	28
Youngest nominee	Jamie Bell (Billy Elliot, 2001)	14	Jacob Tremblay (Room, 2016)	9	Jacob Tremblay (Room, 2016)	9

== Multiple winners ==
Two awards

- Mahershala Ali (Moonlight (2016), Green Book (2018))

== Multiple nominees ==
Note: Winners are indicated in bold type.

Two nominations

- Mahershala Ali (**Moonlight** (2016), **Green Book** (2018))
- Alan Arkin (Little Miss Sunshine (2006), Argo (2012))
- Christian Bale (**The Fighter** (2010), The Big Short (2015))
- Javier Bardem (**No Country for Old Men** (2007), Skyfall (2012))
- Kenneth Branagh (Othello (1995), My Week With Marilyn (2011))
- Jeff Bridges (The Contender (2000), Hell or High Water (2016))
- Don Cheadle (Devil in a Blue Dress (1995), Crash (2005))
- Robert De Niro (Silver Linings Playbook (2012), Killers of the Flower Moon (2023))
- Benicio del Toro (21 Grams (2003), One Battle After Another (2025))
- Robert Downey Jr. (Tropic Thunder (2008), **Oppenheimer** (2023))
- Robert Duvall (**A Civil Action** (1998), The Judge (2014))
- Jamie Foxx (Collateral (2004), Just Mercy (2019))
- Woody Harrelson (The Messenger (2009), Three Billboards Outside Ebbing, Missouri (2017))
- Ed Harris (**Apollo 13** (1995), The Hours (2002))
- Ethan Hawke (Training Day (2001), Boyhood (2014))
- Philip Seymour Hoffman (Doubt (2008), The Master (2012))
- Tommy Lee Jones (No Country for Old Men (2007), **Lincoln** (2012))
- Edward Norton (Birdman (2014), A Complete Unknown (2024))
- Dev Patel (Slumdog Millionaire (2008), Lion (2016))
- Christopher Plummer (The Last Station (2009), **Beginners** (2011))
- Mark Ruffalo (The Kids Are All Right (2010), Foxcatcher (2014))
- Geoffrey Rush (Shakespeare in Love (1998), The King's Speech (2010))

Three nominations

- Chris Cooper (American Beauty (1999), Adaptation. (2002), Seabiscuit (2003))
- Willem Dafoe (Shadow of the Vampire (2000), The Florida Project (2017), Poor Things (2023))
- Jared Leto (**Dallas Buyers Club** (2013), The Little Things (2020), House of Gucci (2021))

== See also ==
- Academy Award for Best Supporting Actor
- BAFTA Award for Best Actor in a Supporting Role
- Independent Spirit Award for Best Supporting Male
- Critics' Choice Movie Award for Best Supporting Actor
- Golden Globe Award for Best Supporting Actor – Motion Picture
