= By the Fireside (Ghanaian TV program) =

Ghanaian children's TV program

By The Fire Side was a Ghanaian children's educational and entertainment television program which combined storytelling (folklore) with music and dance. The program mostly focused on the exploits of Kweku Ananse, the cunning and crafty spider who often outwits humans and his fellow animals in the animal kingdom. The format of the program involves children sitting around while the story teller sits in the middle. By The Fire Side was mostly aired on GTV.
