= Alexandra Duah =

Ghanaian Actress

- Died: 2000
- Citizenship: Ghanaian
- Occupation: Actor
- Known for: Ama, Heritage Africa, African Timber, Sankofa, Matters of the heart

Alexandra Duah (died 2000) was a Ghanaian veteran actress who contributed to the growth of the Ghanaian movie industry.

== Education ==
She was trained in cinematography and qualified as a film editor. She had training from an old actress named Jean P. Martin in London to improve her skills.

== Filmography ==
List of movies over the years.

- Matters of The Heart (1993)
- Sankofa (1993) Nunu
- Aya Minnow (1992) Betty
- African Timber (1989) as Marktfrau
- Ama (1991) as Sister Mabel
- Heritage Africa (1989)
- Mamma Mia (1995)
