= H. D. Twum-Barimah =

Ghanaian military personnel

Brigadier H. D. Twum-Barimah was a Ghanaian military personnel and a former Chief of Army Staff of the Ghana Army. He served as Chief of Army Staff from October 1971 to January 1972.
