= Mac Jordan Amartey =

Ghanaian actor

- Born: 1936; Ghana
- Died: 6 July 2018 (aged 81–82)
- Other name: Sugar daddy
- Occupation: Actor
- Known for: Matters of the heart, Black star, Victim of love (1998), Fatal decision
- Children: 4

Mac Jordan Amartey (1936–2018) was a popular Ghanaian actor. He was a veteran actor who played major roles in Ghanaian movies.

In 2017, he disclosed that he used a prosthetic leg after an amputation as a result of diabetes. Amartey was very popular in a lot of Ghanaian movies including the popular Idikoko TV series.

== Filmography ==
- Matters of the Heart (1993)
- Black Star (2006) as Ataa Myai
- Dark Sand (1999) as Walker
- I Surrender (1998) as Pastor
- The Returnee 2 (1995)
- Victim of Love (1998)
- Fatal Decision (1993)

== Death ==
Mac Jordan died at the Korle Bu Teaching Hospital on July 6, 2018, after battling with diabetes. He left behind a wife and four children.
