= Obra (Ghanaian TV series) =

Ghanaian TV drama series

- Akan: Ɔbra
- Literally: Life
- Genre: Comedy drama
- Starring: David Dontoh (Ghanaman); Grace Omaboe (Maame Dokonu); Joe Eyison (Station Master); Belinda Naa Ode Oku (Adwoa Smart)
- Theme music composer: Nana Kwame Ampadu
- Opening theme: "Obra"
- Ending theme: "Obra"
- Country of origin: Ghana
- Original language: Twi

Original release
- Network: GTV
- Release: February 1982

Related
- Keteke

Obra (Akan: Ɔbra, lit. 'Life') was a Ghanaian television drama series which was very popular in Ghana in the 1980s.

== From Keteke to Obra TV series ==
Some key members of the Obra drama group first appeared in a situational TV drama series called Keteke (Train/Locomotive) on GTV in 1981. The main plot of Keteke centred on everyday encounters at a train station, highlighting the challenges of ordinary people as they strive to make a decent living. This explains why Keteke had some notable characters: a Station Master who managed the affairs of the train station; a Ghanaman who portrayed the challenges of the ordinary Ghanaian; and Maame Dokono (Madam Kenkey) the resident food vendor of the train station. In the show, the Keteke station naturally becomes a crucial public space for everyday sociality, the hub for local gossip, and the centre for all manner of dealings. Additionally, Keteke highlighted the economic hardship of the time and the moral dilemmas that the characters faced in their quest to make a living through fair or foul means. Keteke was later transformed into Obra.

== History ==
Primetime Sunday evening entertainment in Ghana had been the preserve of the Osofo Dadzie group since 1972. However, cracks began to appear in the unity and cohesion of the Osofo Dadzie group when they returned from a European tour in the early 1980s. Some key members of the group had surreptitiously obtained visas with the intention of embarking on the tour without the involvement of Jane Ackon, Bea Kissi, Frimpong Manso and other key members. Invariably, the tour turned out to be a disaster, given the omission of these core members. Upon return, the group had also requested a small raise in their transport and logistic costs from ¢40 to ¢65, in order to reflect the rising cost of living in the country but management of GBC-TV refused to compromise. Consequently, the group refused to perform any new plays until the impasse was resolved. This meant that between October and December 1981, GBC-TV had to broadcast old Osofo Dadzie episodes, which gradually lost their public appeal. The new Head of State and leader of the Provisional National Defence Council (PNDC) at the time, Flt Lieutenant Jerry John Rawlings became aware of the impasse and therefore invited key members of the production crew, Grace Omaboe (one of the main scriptwriters of Osofo Dadzie) and Nana Bosompra (producer), to consider the formation of a rival group in order to fill the vacant artistic space while a permanent solution was found for the Osofo Dadzie problem. Thus, the two liaised with other notable players in the industry to organise auditions and recruit the cast of the new show.

The previous year (1981), Keteke had started and was gradually gaining public appeal. Grace Omaboe and Nana Bosompra therefore rebranded Keteke and converted it into Obra, a bigger production with a larger cast and more diversified plots. Cast members mostly spoke Twi, Fante and Akuapem. Obra episodes generally addressed the virtues and vices of life such as honesty, integrity, patience, perseverance, gratitude, envy, greed, jealousy, treachery, etc. Two of the older actors, Joe Eyison and Esi Kom, were often cast as a married couple. Similarly, Grace Omaboe and David Dontoh were often cast as husband and wife, even from the earliest episodes, thus sparking speculations about a possible off-screen romantic relationship between the two. According to the creators of Obra, one of the main points of departure from the rival Osofo Dadzie brand was for cast members not to wear formal attire such as suits and tie. Hence, the Obra cast mostly wore local attire, such as slit and kaba, which reflected Ghanaian history and culture.

== Cast ==
Over time, the cast of Obra became household names in Ghana. The cast were primarily drawn from the Ghana Theatre Club and School of Performing Arts, of which Grace Omaboe was a member. The original cast included David Dontoh (Ghanaman), Grace Omaboe (Maame Dokono) and Joe Eyison (Station Master). Other cast members include Edinam Atatsi, Oklu, Charles Adu Armah, Emily Brown, B. K. Afandoh, Esi Kom, and Amankwaa Ampofo, who worked in the Languages Section of GBC at the time. Jane Ackon of Osofo Dadzie fame was later drafted into Obra by Grace Omaboe. One of the actors who joined the cast of Obra later in 1984 was Belinda Oku (Adwoa Smart).

== Theme tune ==
The theme tune for the series, also titled "Obra" (Ɔbra in Twi), was composed and performed by Nana Kwame Ampadu.

== See also ==
- Osofo Dadzie
