= Grace Omaboe =

Ghanaian actress and media personality

- Born: June 10, 1946 (age 79); Birim North District, Ghana
- Other names: Maame Dokono
- Occupations: Actress, singer, television personality, author and politician
- Children: 6

Grace Omaboe (born 10 June 1946), popularly known as Maame Dɔkono, is a Ghanaian actress, singer, and television personality. She ran the former Peace and Love Orphanage, now Graceful Grace school in Accra. Omaboe and others were honored by the organizers of the 3Music Awards for their achievements in the entertainment industry in Ghana.

== Early life ==
Grace Omaboe was born on 10 June 1946, in Nyafuman, Birim North District, Ghana.

Grace Omaboe started her career in the arts by performing in school plays and local theater productions. Her talent and charm were noticeable from the beginning. Omaboe's first acting role was in the Akan Drama Series Obra, which was broadcast on GBC TV. Omaboe was a scriptwriter for the television series, Osofo Dadzie.

== Education ==
She attended Abetifi Girls Senior High School. She furthered her studies at the University of Ghana, where she obtained a degree in Theatre Arts.

== Career ==
Omaboe was initially a writer on Osofo Dadzi in the 70s when she was encouraged by Nana Bosompra to act in a series, which she co-produced called Keteke. In the 1990s, she hosted a popular kids' show called The Fireside on National television.

Omaboe featured in several Ghanaian movies, both Akan and English. She starred in the 2013 short film Kwaku Ananse.

In 2000, Omaboe stood as a parliamentary candidate for the National Democratic Congress (NDC) in New Abirem for Birim North Constituency in the Eastern Region where she came second.

In 2008, Omaboe supported the New Patriotic Party (NPP). Omaboe claimed that the NDC fabricated stories against her, which required her to fight and win a court case brought against her orphanage for criminal negligence. The orphanage was closed down due to operating without a licence. Omaboe left politics in 2016, saying it was a waste of time, money, and full of people telling untruths.

Omaboe was selected to be President of the 2017 Golden Movie Awards Africa (GMAA) jury.

== Filmography ==
- Obra
- Matters of the Heart (1993)
- I Surrender (1998) as Julie
- Expectations 1 (1998) as Obaa Mercy
- A Stab in the Dark (1999)
- Expectations 2 (1999) as Obaa Mercy
- Jewels 1 (1999) as Thelma
- Jewels 2 (2000) as Thelma
- The Chosen One (2003) as Mrs Prempeh
- Kwaku Ananse (Short film) (2013) as Aso Yaa
- Children of The Mountain (2016) as Naana
- John and John (2017)
- Amerikafo (Short film) (2018) as Grandma
- P over D (2019) as Maame Serwaa
- Aloe Vera (2020)
- Nobody's Ex (2021) as Grandma
- Freedom and Justice (2021) as Mother
- Red Carpet (2022)
- Yaa (2023)

== Personal life ==
Omaboe has been married and subsequently divorced twice. She has six children, two of whom are based in the United States, two in the Netherlands, and the rest in Ghana.

Omaboe says she had a relationship with David Dontoh during their days on Keteke and Obra. It is believed that the pair dated for about four years during their heyday. Dontoh does not confirm or deny these rumors but insists that the two were very good friends and particularly close during the period when Omaboe was separated from her first husband. Omaboe and Dontoh separated but have remained close friends ever since.

On the 6th of October 2024, at the Accra International Conference Center (AICC), where Omaboe was honored during the Ghana Women Awards program, she made a statement describing herself as a living legend when she was giving her speech.
