= Howard J. Ford =

English independent filmmaker, director and producer

Howard J. Ford is an English independent filmmaker, writer-director and producer, known especially for his 2021 film The Lockdown Hauntings, starring Tony Todd, Angela Dixon and Russell Shaw, which was filmed entirely during the COVID-19 lockdown. Other works of his include The Dead (2010), starring Prince David Osei and David Dontoh, Escape (2023), starring Sarah Alexandra Marks, and The Dead 2: India, starring Joseph Millson.

== Filmography ==
Year	Film	Director	Producer	Writer	Editor	Notes
1994	Mainline Run	Yes	Yes	Yes	Yes	Starring Hugo Speer and Kelly Marcel
2000	Distant Shadow	Yes	No	No	Yes	Starring Stephen Tiller and Rosie Fellner
2010	The Dead	Yes	Yes	Yes	Yes	Starring Prince David Osei and David Dontoh
2013	The Dead 2: India	Yes	Yes	Yes	Yes	Starring Joseph Millson
2015	Never Let Go	Yes	Yes	Yes	Yes	Starring Angela Dixon and Rami Nasr
2016	A Spectre Calls	Yes	No	No	No	Short film.
2019	Adventure Boyz	Yes	Yes	Yes	No	
2021	The Lockdown Hauntings	Yes	No	No	No	Starring Tony Todd, Angela Dixon and Megan Tremethick.
2022	The Ledge	Yes	No	No	No	Starring Brittany Ashworth and Ben Lamb.
2022	Escape	Yes	Yes	Yes	No	
2024	DarkGame	Yes	No	No	No	Starring Ed Westwick
2024	River of Blood	Yes	Yes	No	No	
2026	Bone Keeper	Yes	Yes	Yes	Yes	
2026	Zip Wire	Yes	No	No	No	
