= Jerry Morrison =

Jerry Morrison may refer to:

- Jerry Morrison, musician in Bleach (American band)
- Jerry Morrison, character in 31 North 62 East

== See also ==
- Jeremy Morrison (disambiguation)
