= The Dead (2010 film) =

- Theatrical poster
- Directed by: Howard J. Ford; Jon Ford
- Written by: Howard J. Ford; Jon Ford
- Produced by: Howard J. Ford; Amir S. Moallemi
- Starring: Rob Freeman; Prince David Osei; David Dontoh; Ben Crow
- Cinematography: Jon Ford
- Music by: Imran Ahmad
- Production companies: Indelible Productions; Latitude Films
- Distributed by: Anchor Bay Entertainment
- Release date: 30 August 2010
- Running time: 98 minutes
- Country: United Kingdom
- Language: English

The Dead is a 2010 British zombie film produced by Indelible Productions and Latitude Films. It was written and directed by the Ford brothers and stars Rob Freeman, Prince David Osei, and David Dontoh.

== Plot ==
Amidst a zombie outbreak, the final evacuation plane out of Africa crashes off the coast of West Africa. Lieutenant Brian Murphy (Freeman), a United States Air Force engineer, is the sole survivor of the crash.

Hiding and evading zombies, Brian gathers supplies from the plane. In a village, he finds and fixes a broken-down truck. While driving, the truck gets stuck in a pothole. As zombies close in, Brian is rescued by Daniel Dembele (Osei), a local African soldier gone AWOL. The zombie attack the previous night had killed Daniel's wife, while his son was rescued by a military unit heading north to a military base. Daniel agrees to lead Brian to the nearest airport in exchange for the truck, so that Daniel can use it to find his son.

At the airport, Brian uses the air traffic tower's radio to call for help, but receives no response. After Daniel gathers fuel for the truck, the two travel to the military base together, with Brian hoping they have a plane he can use to fly back to the United States. They rest at night in a village safeguarded by a group of local soldiers, and leave in the morning.

While driving through the African plains, the truck hits a tree, breaking the axle and disabling the vehicle. Brian and Daniel continue on foot and sleep around a fire at night, but are caught off guard by a zombie horde. They manage to shoot their way out, but Daniel is bitten and badly wounded. Daniel hands Brian the necklace he planned to give his son, before succumbing to his wounds.

After an arduous journey through dangerous and rough terrain, Brian reaches the northern military base, which has become a survival colony. He repairs an old radio unit in the base and broadcasts his name. He manages to reach military officer Frank Greaves at a U.S. military base in Henderson, Nevada. It is revealed that the epidemic has reached the United States, which is rapidly failing to hold out. When Brian asks about his family, Frank informs him that "they're gone." Zombies invade the U.S. military base, ending the radio transmission.

Brian goes outside as zombies overwhelm the gates around the colony and begin killing the survivors. Daniel's son approaches Brian, having seen his father's necklace in his hand. They turn to face the approaching horde, their fates left ambiguous.

== Cast ==
- Rob Freeman as Lieutenant Brian Murphy
- Prince David Osei as Sergeant Daniel Dembele
- David Dontoh as The Chief
- Ben Crowe as Dan Ryder
- Dan Morgan as James
- John Dunton-Downer as Lieutenant Frank Greaves
- Jon Ford as Mercenary with shotgun (cameo)
- Howard J. Ford as Dying Mercenary on beach (cameo)

== Production ==
The production encountered many problems, and rather than shooting in the planned six weeks, the crew actually ending up taking 12 weeks. A delay in the shipping of the equipment to Africa initially added three weeks to the schedule; other notable problems included the lead actor Rob Freeman contracting malaria and almost dying in the middle of filming. He was taken to the local hospital and put on an IV drip for several days. Another delay was caused by considerable damage to camera equipment. Shooting took place in Burkina Faso and Ghana. Post-production was done in Brighton, London and Elstree in the UK. The film sound mix was completed by Bafta nominated Adam and Graham Daniel shortly before Christmas 2010. Howard J. Ford published a book, titled Surviving the Dead (2012), that detailed the troubled production history.

== Release ==
The film premiered in August 2010 at Frightfest, and its US premiere was at Fantastic Fest. US and UK rights were acquired by Anchor Bay Entertainment. After a UK theatrical the UK DVD and Blu-ray was released in September 2011. In the U.S., The Dead opened on over 150 screens. The US DVD and Blu-ray commenced in February 2012.

== Reception ==
Review aggregator website Rotten Tomatoes reports a 72% approval rating and an average rating of 5.7/10 based on 18 reviews. Metacritic rated it 59/100 based on six reviews. Joe Leydon of Variety wrote, "With nary a trace of snark, satire or self-consciousness, Brit sibling filmmakers Howard J. and Jon Ford breathe some fresh life into zombie-thriller tropes." Mark Adams of Screen Daily wrote, "And while the story offers nothing particularly new to the genre, The Dead is a film made with passion and enthusiasm and is certainly distinctive in tone and backdrop." Phelim O'Neill of The Guardian rated it 3/5 stars and wrote, "This low-budget zombie movie rises out of the pack thanks to a smart and ambitious decision to shoot in Burkina Faso." Neil Genzlinger of The New York Times wrote that the film has a possibly unintended, disturbing metaphorical subtext due to Africans killing each other. Of the road movie aspects, Genzlinger called it "a long, chemistry-free slog through the zombified countryside". The Los Angeles Times wrote that the setting initially helps the film's atmosphere but eventually overwhelms it with metaphors of violence in Africa. John DeFore of The Washington Post criticized casting, acting, and writing, though he said that the gore effects will satisfy horror fans. Chuck Wilson of The Village Voice called it "Night of the Living Dead reimagined as a Sergio Leone western". The Star Tribune rated it 2/4 stars and wrote that the film lacks enough social commentary and creepy scares to make up for its lack of fully using its setting. Marc Savlov of The Austin Chronicle rated it 3/5 stars and wrote that "the film provides a whole new way of looking at the same old dead things". Chuck Bowen of Slant Magazine rated it 2/4 stars and called it "a perfectly serviceable horror movie" that "fails to transcend the banality of its inevitable theme". Matthew Lee of Twitch Film wrote, "Though the brothers generally treat their story with a fair degree of sensitivity, never patronising or exoticising anyone, other than the setting there's nothing that unique about it." Mike Pereira of Bloody Disgusting rated it 3/5 stars and called it a "pretty routine" zombie film that will appeal to hardcore zombie fans. Steve Barton of Dread Central rated it 4/5 stars and called it one of the best recent zombie films.

== Sequel ==
A sequel, The Dead 2: India, was released on 22 August 2013, and then on DVD on 16 September 2014. Unlike the first film, the setting takes place in India. The sequel follows the story of American engineer Nicholas Burton (Joseph Millson) in a race against time to reach his pregnant girlfriend Ishani Sharma (Meenu Mishra) during a virus outbreak. Burton enlists the help of an orphaned street kid Javed (Anand Krishna Goyal), and together, they make a perilous 300-mile (480-kilometre) journey across deadly landscapes as a zombie apocalypse threatens to engulf the entire nation.
