= Nine Lives (2002 film) =

- UK DVD box cover
- Directed by: Andrew Green
- Written by: Andrew Green; Tom MacRae
- Produced by: Andrew Green; Giles Hattersley; Nikolas Korda
- Starring: Rosie Fellner; Vivienne Harvey; Paris Hilton; Ben Peyton
- Cinematography: Robin Vidgeon
- Edited by: Paul Knight
- Music by: Josh Grafton; Edward White
- Distributed by: Dream Entertainment Inc.
- Release date: 26 August 2002 (London Film Festival)
- Running time: 85 minutes
- Country: United Kingdom
- Language: English
- Budget: $4 million

Nine Lives is a 2002 horror film starring Paris Hilton. The movie was shot in England and was low budget.

== Plot ==
Tim (Patrick Kennedy) invites eight friends of his to his Scottish mansion for a weekend celebration for his 21st birthday. Among the guests is his former college roommate Pete (David Nicolle), Pete's former girlfriend Laura (Amelia Warner), her best friend Emma (Rosie Fellner), Emma's former roommate Lucy (Vivienne Harvey), Lucy's New York socialite friend Jo (Paris Hilton), Jo's Manchester boyfriend Tom (Lex Shrapnel), and fellow college friends Damien (James Schlesinger) and Andy (Ben Peyton).

During the night of a sudden snowstorm which strands everyone in for the night, Tom finds an old book behind a bookcase about a local Scottish lord, named Murray, who was put to death in 1746 during the last Scottish uprising. Upon reading the book, the spirit of Murray emerges from the book and possesses Tom, causing his eyes to turn black, and goes on a killing rampage starting with Jo whom he kills in a bathroom. Next, Tom kills Emma in her bedroom as she is preparing for bed, until he is stopped by Tim who stabs him to death. But then, Tim is possessed by Murray, continuing the killing spree.

When Lucy is stabbed and severely wounded by the possessed Tim, the five survivors hole themselves up in the parlor where they try to make sense to what is going on. While Pete tries to rationalize an explanation, Laura discovers the book that contained the evil spirit of Murray and begins to put two and two together about the possession: whenever the possessed person is killed, the spirit of Murray will pass onto whoever killed his host. Pete and Damian leave the parlor and confront the possessed Tim in the mansion cellar. In the struggle, Damian accidentally kills Tim, and in turn, gets possessed as well.

Leaving Andy behind to look after the wounded Lucy in the parlor, Laura and Pete attempt to capture the possessed Damian, only to have him slip past them when they attempt to trap him in one of the mansion's many bathrooms. The possessed Damian breaks into the parlor and attacks Andy, only to be accidentally killed by the fireplace poker Andy had earlier given to Lucy to defend herself. Realizing that she is now possessed, Andy stabs Lucy with a shard of glass, taking the spirit into himself.

When Laura is attacked and stabs the possessed Andy in self-defense, she realizes that the spirit will pass onto her, so she first pleads with Pete (who has locked himself in the parlor) to kill her before Andy dies. But when Pete is unable to, Laura makes the ultimate sacrifice of stabbing herself so the spirit will not pass onto her. Pete opens the door to prevent her from doing so, but is too late. Laura dies just before Andy expires, and thus saving Pete from being possessed as well.

By the next morning, Pete finds himself the sole survivor of the massacre and after finding the cursed book, he burns it to ensure that nobody else will ever read it and restart the cycle ever again. Pete also realizes as the lone Scot of the group, he was the only one Murray ever intended to spare, albeit alone and emotionally scarred.

== Cast ==
Actor/Actress	Role
Paris Hilton	Jo
David Nicolle	Pete MacGregor
Amelia Warner	Laura
Ben Peyton	Andy
James Schlesinger	Damien
Vivienne Harvey	Lucy
Patrick Kennedy	Tim
Rosie Fellner	Emma
Lex Shrapnel	Tom

== Reception ==
Nine Lives debuted #1 on the Horror Renting Chart for single week before quickly dropping from the chart. It also reached #1 in France and Germany. However, it went to #29 in the United States and #30 in the United Kingdom.

According to Beyondhollywood.com, "Hilton's presence in the cast is the film's main marketing point, which is plainly obvious by the fact that she's front and center on the box art and is the only recognizable name in the cast". The website noted that her character was, basically, herself: "Hilton plays—what else?—a spoiled American socialite who shops on three continents in one day. The script is even clever enough to take a few jabs at Hilton's real-life social standing, even mentioning that she's been on the cover of a few sleaze rags in her day".
