= Distant Shadow =

- Directed by: Howard J. Ford
- Written by: Mark Andrews
- Produced by: Mark Andrews
- Starring: Stephen Tiller; Rosie Fellner
- Cinematography: Jon Ford; Jonathan Ford
- Edited by: Howard J. Ford
- Music by: Guy Michelmore
- Distributed by: Adrenalin Films
- Release date: 13 October 2000
- Running time: 100 minutes
- Country: United Kingdom
- Language: English

Distant Shadow is a 1999 film. A thriller made in the UK, it is 100 minutes in length and was directed by Howard J. Ford.

== Plot summary ==
Michelle witnesses the brutal murder of her mother while she is a four-year-old child. Sixteen years later she is still traumatized by memories, and living in poverty at a boarding house, struggling to pay the rent. She befriends a mysterious man who moves in across the hall named Charles Paskin. Something doesn't seem right about him and Michelle decides to investigate. She discovers that Charlie is working for the British government. His mission is to retrieve government files about a top secret operation which has been stolen, and he has been instructed to dispose anyone associated with these documents. Michelle believes that he may be connected with the murder of her mother. While trying to figure out the mystery, Michelle is dragged into a world of violence, conspiracy, and revenge where she soon discovers that nothing is as it seems and that no one can be trusted.

== Cast ==
- Stephen Tiller as Charles Paskin
- Rosie Fellner as Michelle Wallace
- Trevor Byfield as John Clay
- Andrew Faulkner as Steve
- Terrence Hardiman as The Svit
- Mark Little as The Landlord
- Shane Richie as Paul
- Mark Chapman as Jimmy Scarface
- Gary Smith as Deaf Nick
- Paul Maddocks as Vince
- Gillian Tully as Tina (as Gillian Tulley)
- James Healing as Mike
- Andrew Pleavin as Collins
