= Giles Hattersley =

British journalist

Giles Hattersley (born 1979) is a journalist at the British edition of Vogue.

== Career ==
Hattersley attended Central Saint Martins College of Art and Design, where he earned a Master of Arts (MA) degree in fashion journalism. His first job after obtaining his degree was an internship with The Sunday Times in its "Style" supplement, after which he moved to the "News Review" section where he became a feature writer. He served as producer of the 2002 horror film Nine Lives, which starred Paris Hilton.

In 2005, Hattersley was short listed in the Young Journalist of the Year category at the British Press Awards, although in the end the award was given to Lucy Bannerman of The Herald. Later, Hattersley succeeded Jasper Gerard as chief interviewer at The Sunday Times, becoming the youngest person ever to hold the role.

In March 2007, Hattersley joined men's magazine Arena as its editor at a time when sales of the magazine were falling. The magazine underwent a well-received relaunch during his tenure that attracted praise from the industry for its fresh look, which aimed (in Hattersley's words) to make Arena "the authoritative monthly bible that arms its readers with the sharpest looks and opinions". However, sales continued to decline and in March 2008, it was announced that Hattersley would leave Arena and return to The Sunday Times.

In 2017, Hattersley joined the British edition of Vogue as features director under its new editor-in-chief Edward Enninful.
