= David Dontoh =

Ghanaian actor

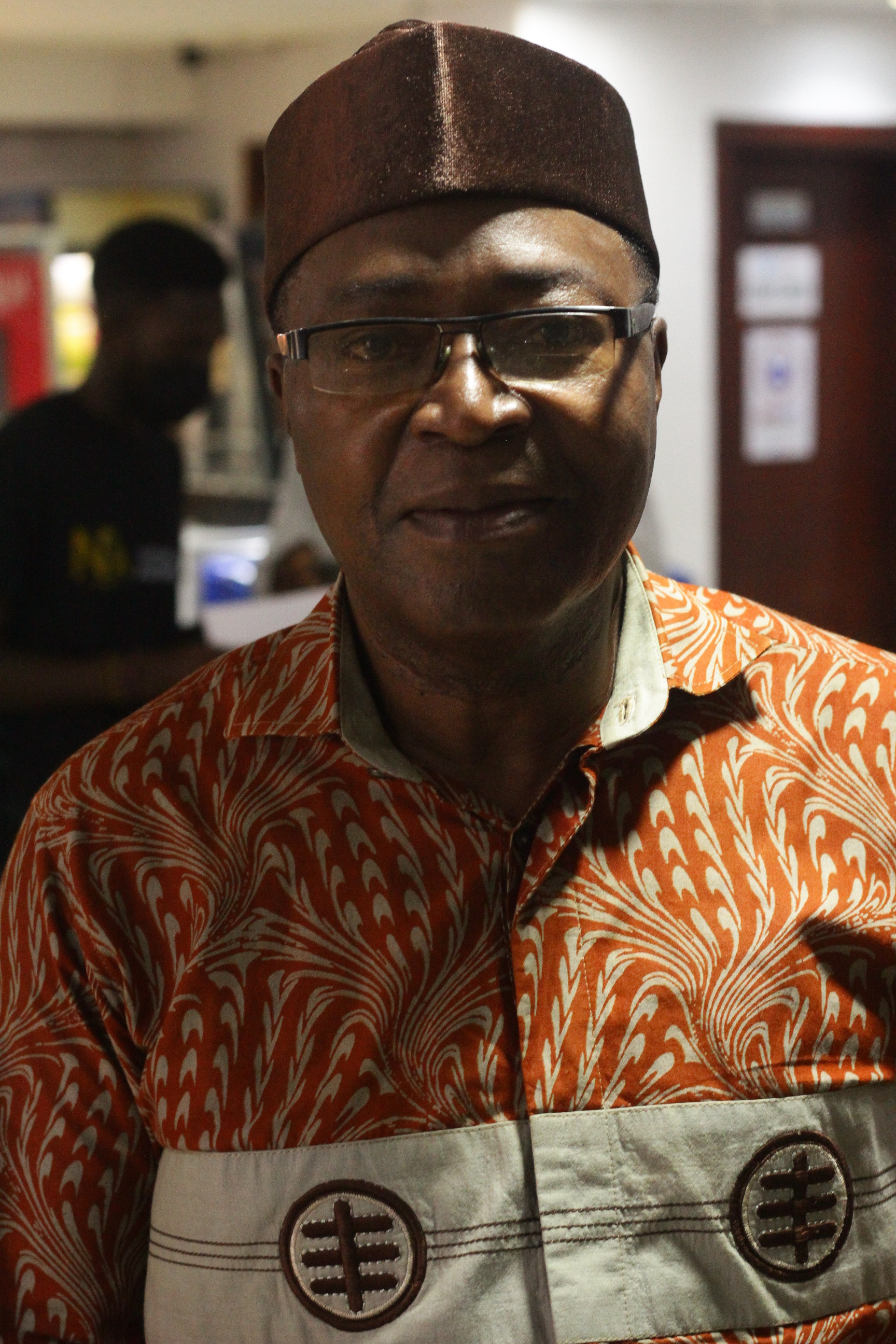
- Born: David Kwame Dontoh; 1964; Cape Coast, Ghana
- Education: University of Ghana
- Occupations: Actor, television personality
- Spouse: Rebecca Dontoh
- Children: 3
- Awards: Best Actor Award in 1984

David Kwame Dontoh (born 1964) and affectionately called Uncle David, "Ghanaman" and "Kofi Abranteɛ" (Kofi Gentleman), is a veteran Ghanaian actor and television personality who has starred in numerous local and international films, drama, theatre and other stage productions. He has been very influential in the development of television and drama, especially during the golden age of theatre in Ghana in the 80s and 90s. He took up acting in 1980 after seeing a National Film and Television Institute (NAFTI) newspaper advert inviting potential actors to come forward for training in stage and film acting. His first NAFTI film was The Way To Shame, a short seven minute stage production which was directed by Alex Bannerman as part of his formal assessment in drama production. Bannerman who was a student of NAFTI at the time had chanced upon Dontoh and persuaded him to play the lead role, as the intended person had not showed up during shooting. The film's assessment panel, especially Mike Hagan, recognised Dontoh's potential in theatre and drama and highlighted this to the young Alex Bannerman. Subsequently, Dontoh's acting potential became more noticed when he played the lead role in Gus: The Theatre Cat, a short stage adaptation of a poem by T. S. Eliot. The play was directed by George Andoh Wilson of Wilson Acting Academy fame.

== Obra Drama Group ==
Dontoh is best known for his long term role as "Ghanaman", the struggling archetypal middle-aged Ghanaian in the popular local comedy-drama series Ɔbra (Twi for "life"), which was hugely popular in the 80s and 90s. Ɔbra started off as Keteke, a small theatre production first aired on Ghana Broadcasting Corporation (GBC) to rival Osofo Dadzie.

In Ɔbra, Dontoh starred alongside legendary Ghanaian actors like Grace Omaboe (Maame Dokono), Joe Eyison (Station Master), Amankwaa Ampofo, Esi Kom, Belinda Oku (Adwoa Smart), among others. At this time, Ɔbra was in direct competition with Osofo Dadzie, a rival theatre production which also aired during primetime on Sunday evenings immediately after Talking Point. Later on, Dontoh teamed up with Grace Omaboe (Maame Dokono) to host By The Fire Side, a folklore and storytelling programme which was very popular back in the 90s and beyond. He also co-hosted the hugely popular family entertainment and Akan television quiz programme Agoro (play) as the "Agoro Master" and with his co-host Adwoa Yeboah Adjei (Naporso Hemaa). The programme aired for a decade. With Agoro, participants answered questions about Ghanaian history, language and culture. The programme combined a question-and-answers segment with music and dance. Dontoh later joined forces with other friends in the industry to rebrand Agoro as Agoro Fie (Play House) in 2011 when the former began to wane in popularity.

== Game Shows & Quizzes ==
- Agoro (1998 - 2008)
- Agoro Fie (2011)
- By The Fire Side

== Filmography ==
Dontoh's most notable movies include

- Kukurantumi: Road to Accra (1983) as Bob
- Deadly Voyage (1996) as Bob
- No Time to Die (2006) as Asante
- The Dead (2010) as The Chief
- Somewhere in Africa (2011) as President Gabiza
- Beasts of No Nation (2015) as Linguist
- The Cursed Ones (2015) as Bartender
- Like Cotton Twines (2016) as Father Baani
- Coming to Africa (2020) as Monte

== Notable Projects ==
Dontoh has been a longstanding member of the Ghana National Theatre management team for several decades and only retired from the organisation in 2000. He co-founded the Ghana Union of Theatre Societies with Mr. Effah Nkrabea Darteh. He is also a founding member of the Ghana Actors Guild and was the Guild's first secretary. He has also been the president of the Ghana Concert Parties Union. Dontoh has also been chairman of the planning committee of the Ghana Music Awards for several years.

Aside from mainstream commercial productions, Dontoh runs his own company, Golden Kauri, and a non-governmental organization, Kaurifire Arts Foundation. He has also founded three theatre groups to support burgeoning actors: KOZIKOZI Theatre Company, Edzikanfo Concert Party and David Dontoh Cultural Ensemble (DADON CULEN).

He is currently the board chairman of the newly formed Ghana National Film Authority (NFA) which was inaugurated in December 2019. The National Film Authority provides general oversight and quality control for the film industry. The skeleton organisation is currently housed within the premises of the Bureau of Ghana Languages and yet to be fully staffed. In 2015, he launched his DAS Professional Acting Institute at the Zenith University College, Ghana.

== Early years ==
David Dontoh was born at Gyegyeano, a suburb of Cape Coast in the Central Region of Ghana. His father was a teacher, writer and an agricultural officer with specialism in vegetable farming and animal husbandry. His mother - Elizabeth Victoria Ackon Green (Efua Beduwa) - was a fish monger. The parents never got married. His paternal grandfather (Humphrey Kweku Dontoh) was a fisherman who hails from Gomoa Fete with ancestral links to the town of Saltpond. He grew up in Cape Coast, Abakrampa and Winneba - fishery and farming towns along the central coast of Ghana. His formative years were spent within a large extended family unit, surrounded by uncles and aunties of various professions. He attributes his success in acting to everyday social situations around conflict, comedy and cohesion within the large and complex family network that he grew in. From an early age, the young David Dontoh took a keen interest in science, geography, history, literature, poetry, philosophy, classical and contemporary art, among others. He was the best geography student in 1975 and could sketch out the globe from memory. He read some of the most influential classical works by Socrates, Plato and Aristotle during school holidays. Originally, Dontoh had wanted to pursue a career either as a doctor or a pilot but fell short of the required admission grades after his Sixth Form exams. A misdemeanour in childhood spurred Dontoh's interest in medicine. He stitched the wound of a friend with whom he had gone to steal coconut fruits from a neighbour's house. The boy had injured his hand on broken glass whiles jumping over a wall to escape capture. Dontoh bravely intervened and secretly stitched the wound with common household needle and thread. Interestingly, doctors found the botched surgical job so expertly done that they felt compelled to leave the stitches in place until the wound completely healed. This remarkable episode earned him the nickname of "Doctor David", which further galvanised his interest in medicine.

Despite these experiences, the prohibitive cost of pursuing medicine at the time compelled Dontoh to rethink his decision to go along his original career path. He initially worked with his father for eight years at APPLE (Association of People for Practical Life Education), a subsidiary of USAID at Atebubu in the Brong Ahafo Region of Ghana. At one point, APPLE held a competition for artists to design a logo for the organisation. The young Dontoh's design of the APPLE logo was adjudged the best by the panel. Thereafter, he worked with the Ghana Centre for National Culture (Ghana Arts Centre). Subsequently, he branched into acting through an uncle who was involved in amateur and semi-professional acting. His family initially disapproved of his new career choice due to the degrading and low pay nature of "concert" at the time. However, his parents gradually gave him their support and blessing when his acting flare and prowess became evident through popular acclaim.

As a young man, David Dontoh dabbled in a lot of interests and hobbies on account of his wide and diversified talents and skills. Prior to becoming popular on the theatre and drama scene, he took up boxing and athletics during his secondary school days. He was an amateur boxer for six years and often trained at the Kaneshie Boxing Complex on holidays with the likes of Azuma Nelson Kpakpo Allotey, Adama Mensah, among others. Dontoh once sparred with the legendary Ghanaian boxer Azuma Nelson and claims to have once knocked the champion boxer to the canvas in a sparring session during their early years. However, his father dissuaded him from going along that path because he saw boxing as a profession which is beneath the intellectual capacities of his bright and promising son. The prevailing emphasis on white colour jobs at the time were additional compelling factors. Moreover, Dontoh's interest in boxing and athletics gradually waned when he became fully immersed in acting and started touring the country with theatre and drama groups.

David Dontoh started his acting career whiles living with his aunt who lives at Dansoman. The director of USAID, Olean Hess who worked with Dontoh's aunt at the time had visited the house and noticed his incredible talent in art. The young Dontoh agreed to draw 70 illustrations for Olean Hess' new book, Agriculture In The Tropics, for a small fee.

== Education ==
David Dontoh's primary education was at various schools in Cape Coast, Winneba, and Abakrampa in the Central Region of Ghana. He performed in several amateur productions during his secondary school days. He had his secondary education at Apam Senior High School. He studied science, English and poetry. In later years when his popularity began to soar on the acting scene, his co-actor at the time - Grace Omaboe (Maame Dokono) of Obra fame - encouraged him to obtain formal qualifications in theatre and drama after he won the Best Actor Award in 1984. Dontoh therefore studied Drama and Theatre at the School of Performing Arts University of Ghana between 1985 and 1988, where he majored in playwriting and obtained a diploma.

== Personal life ==
David Dontoh is married to Rebecca Dontoh. The couple have three children, two of whom are Jojo and Ewurama. There are speculations that he dated Grace Omaboe (Maame Dokono) for about four years during their days together as cast members of the popular drama group Obra. The pair were often cast as husband and wife in most Obra episodes. The strong chemistry and understanding of between the on-screen couple has always been evident to audiences. In many interviews, Dontoh does not confirm or deny rumours about their romantic liaisons, but insists that the two were very good friends and particularly close during the period when Grace Omaboe was separation from her first husband. Grace Omaboe is however more candid about their relationship. She has disclosed in interviews that the two dated for a while. According to Grace, they were genuinely in love and had even considered marriage but decided against it on grounds of irreconcilable differences in expectations. Dontoh had wanted them to have a family together, but Grace already had six children from previous marriages. She had also gone beyond her 40th birthday and therefore made a personal decision not to have any more children because of possible complications with pregnancies at that age. At the time, Dontoh was the younger of the two and yet to have a family of his own. The pair therefore separated by mutual consent but have remained close friends ever since.

Apart from acting, Dontoh is also a poet, scriptwriter, dramatist, playwright (television and screenplay), composer, singer, songwriter, painter, sculptor, graphic illustrator, etc. He has composed several songs and written over 300 poems in Fanti, Twi and English. He is the board chairman of the newly formed Ghana National Film Authority. He is also a judge on the Ghana 48 hours film competition.

== Filmography ==
=== Film ===
Year	Film	Role	Notes
1983	Kukurantumi: Road to Accra	Bob	
1989	Heritage Africa		
1991	Sika Sunsum	Jimmy Cash	Direct-to-video
1993	Confessions	Paa Kwesi	Direct-to-video
1996	Deadly Voyage	Bob	
1998	Victim of Love		Direct-to-video
2004	Welcome Home	Taxi Driver	
2006	No Time to Die	Asante	
2010	The Dead	The Chief	
2011	Ties That Bind	Koo	
2012	Kweiba	Father	
2013	The Dead 2: India	The Chief	
2015	Pieces of Me	Board Member	Direct-to-video
2015	Beasts of No Nation	Linguist	
2015	Chronicles of Odumkrom: The Headmaster	Mr. Brown	
2015	The Cursed Ones	Bar Tender	
2016	Like Cotton Twines	Father Baani	
2019	Smoke Screen	Uncle Debrah	
2020	Coming to Africa	Monte	
2020	Lagos to Oslo	Professor Obiora	
2021	Freedom and Justice	President	Drama
2023	Coming to Africa: Welcome to Ghana		Comedy / Drama / Romance
2024	The Groomsmen		Drama

=== Television ===
Year	Film	Role	Notes
1996	Screen Two	Bob	Episode: "Deadly Voyage"
2017	Beat	Mr. Ntim	

== Awards and recognition ==
- Best Actor ECRAG Award 1984,1989 and 1992
- Best Supporting and World Centenary of Film, Ghana Film Award 1999
- PAM African Film Festival
- Ghana Peace Award (2017)
