= Heather Peace =

English actress and singer (born 1975)

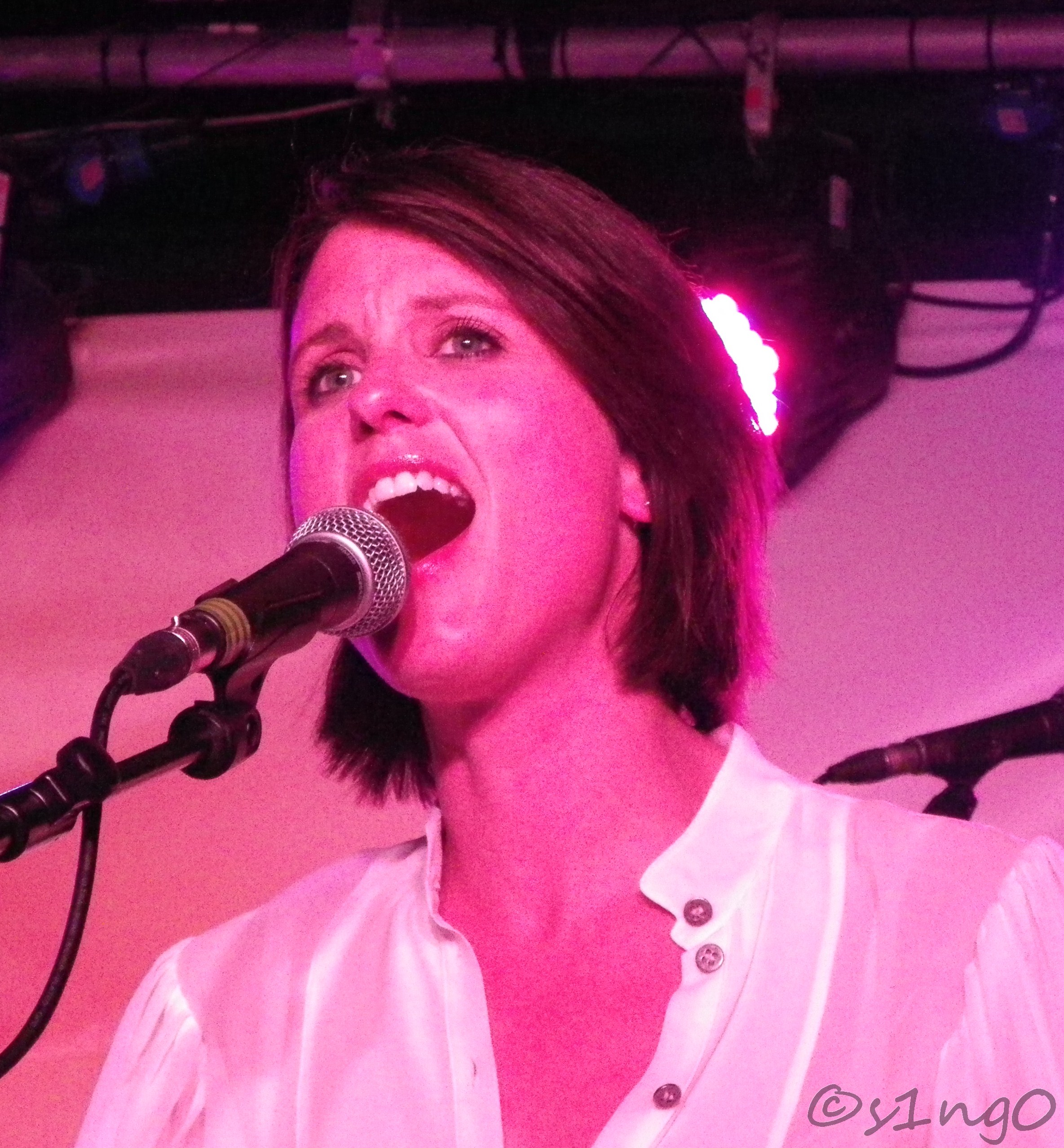
- Peace in 2012
- Born: Heather Mary Peace; 16 June 1975 (age 51); Bradford, West Yorkshire, England
- Occupations: Actress; singer; director
- Years active: 1996–present
- Television: Emmerdale; London's Burning; Ultimate Force; Lip Service; Waterloo Road; EastEnders
- Spouse: Ellie Dickinson (m. 2013)
- Children: 3
- Website: heatherpeace.com

Heather Mary Peace (born 16 June 1975) is an English actress, singer and LGBT rights activist. She is known for her roles as Eve Unwin in the BBC soap opera EastEnders and Nikki Boston in the BBC school-based drama series Waterloo Road. Her other credits include Sally 'Gracie' Fields in ITV's long-running series London's Burning, Fiona Murray in Kay Mellor's drama series The Chase and Sam Murray in the BBC Scotland drama series Lip Service.

== Early life and education ==
Heather Peace was born in Bradford, West Yorkshire. She has been playing piano since she was six years old, and guitar since her teens. Peace decided to be an actress at an early age and credits her parents for the encouragement they gave her to achieve that goal. She went to St. Joseph's Catholic College in Manningham, Bradford. Her mother was a long-serving cantor at St. Joseph's Catholic Church (which is next to the primary school) and also did readings. Peace was also a cantor at St. Joseph's Catholic Church which is where her love of music and singing started. Peace and her mother are no longer Catholics, due to the Catholic church's stance on LGBT relationships.

Peace studied acting at Manchester Metropolitan University, where she obtained a BA (Hons) degree.

== Career ==
=== Acting ===
Peace's break into television came when she joined the ITV soap opera Emmerdale, playing the character Anne Cullen for seven episodes between January and June 1997.

Her first professional stage role was in the 1997 Harrogate Theatre production of My Fair Lady, playing Eliza Doolittle. She subsequently has played Miranda in Shakespeare's The Tempest and the same character in the actor-musician spoof Return to the Forbidden Planet.

After leaving Emmerdale, Peace took parts in The Bill and Dangerfield, before being cast as Firefighter Sally "Gracie" Fields in the ITV series London's Burning from 1998 until the programme's cancellation in 2002. During this time, Peace made a TV movie called Thunder Road, in which she played Sonia. Between 2003 and 2005, Peace played minor roles in television series including Casualty and Where the Heart Is.

Peace played Special Air Service Trooper Becca Gallagher in the ITV action series Ultimate Force alongside Ross Kemp. Becca was part of the 3rd and 4th series, aired between 2005 and 2008. Peace has given credit to the writers for making Becca 'one of the lads', rather than an overly emotional character and said she had 'so much fun' playing the hero in the show. Ross Kemp has argued the show is made far more interesting by including a female role and believes Peace was the perfect choice for the part ("she is absolutely superb").

During 2006 and 2007, Peace starred in Kay Mellor's TV series The Chase as single mum Fiona Jones. Quite a different character to the action girls often played by Peace, Fiona is portrayed as a left out family member whose resentment and betrayals lead into unexpected sinister behaviour. She then appeared in television series including Coronation Street, Heartbeat and Holby City. In 2008, Peace appeared as the secretly abusing wife in the "Private Sins" episode of Blue Murder. She also starred in the film 31 North 62 East where Peace plays again part of a Special Air Service unit. Peace is Captain Jill Mandelson, who will seek help in her twin Kimberly (also played by Peace) to unfold the political corruption that led to the death of the rest of her unit.

In 2010, Peace was cast as Detective Sergeant Sam Murray in the BBC Three TV series Lip Service. Peace argued that being the only openly lesbian cast member influenced the attention she received regarding the show. The series revolves around the loves and lives of group of aged-30-something lesbians in Glasgow, Scotland. The show reached cult status within the first few episodes, with Peace's character Sam, and the actor herself, becoming also the object of a cult following ("Team Sam" movement among fans of the show). Filming of the second series finished in July 2011 with a transmission date of spring 2012. Since the end of the second and final season fans of the drama called for a third season to be made but Peace said in an interview with Cult Box where she said she would 'definitely' return as the character.

In 2011, Peace was cast as Head of English Nikki Boston, before being appointed Deputy Headteacher in 2013 for the BBC One school-based drama series Waterloo Road. Following a tour of her debut album, she returned to the series for the second part of Series 8. She also featured in Series 9, which screened on BBC One in September 2013. She took another break from Waterloo Road at the end of Series 9 Spring Term but has hinted that she may return in Series 11.

In 2014, Peace took part in ITV's three-part drama Prey as Abi Farrow, wife of main character Detective Constable Marcus Farrow (played by BAFTA nominee John Simm). The drama was directed by BAFTA winner Nick Murphy. In 2016, she appeared in the BBC TV series The Coroner Episode 2.3: "Those in Peril" as Chrissy Woodward. In 2019, she appeared in Series 22 of Silent Witness as DI Murphy. Peace later played Alex Dawson in the BBC One medical drama, Holby City.

In 2019, she hosted a two part chat and music show called Heather Peace at the Bedford on the brand new digital TV channel Diva Box Office, which is the first lesbian digital TV channel in Europe. Guests interviewed on the show include Saara Aalto, Sinitta, Desiree Akhavan, and Alicya Eyo, with Saara Aalto performing her song "Dance Like Nobody's Watching" and Lots Holloway (formerly known as Charlie Rundle from MK1) performing her song "Naked". In 2021, it was announced that Peace would be joining the cast of BBC soap opera EastEnders as Eve Unwin, the wife of Stacey Slater (Lacey Turner).

=== Singing ===
Peace was classically trained at piano since she was six years old and later learned guitar. She held a jazz residency at Velvet while she attended drama school. In a 2000 episode of London's Burning, Peace's character sang a version of the Bette Midler classic "The Rose". Subsequently, released by BMG, it reached no. 58 in the UK charts. She decided to put her music career on hold to concentrate on acting, but in 2011, she reignited her love of music with her first sell out UK tour and the release of an acoustic album of covers and some original songs.

She recorded her full debut jazz album Fairytales with producer Nigel Wright. Following release on 21 May 2012, it achieved number 43 in the UK Albums Chart and number 9 in the independent albums chart, supported by a UK tour. Heather's Fairytales UK tour culminated with a concert in London, where Peace shared a duet with Alison Moyet.

In 2013, she released a single, a Jack Guy remix of "Fight For" available on iTunes, and a special edition of her debut album Fairytales. She has toured Australia twice, where she has taken part in the Sydney Mardi Gras performing on stage as well as hosting the event for the SBS TV.

On 9 June 2014, the single "We Can Change", and her second studio album The Thin Line were officially released. Peace launched the new single with Europe's first rainbow crossing, in Brighton. All the songs in The Thin Line(as well as her previous studio album, Fairytales) are written by Peace. Some of the tracks, however, are the result of a joined work with other songwriters. Such is the case of the single "We Can Change", written by Peace and Shelly Poole, or the song "Lily", a co-write by Peace and her guitarist Michael Clancy.

Peace worked on a second album with producer James Lewis, both having a "duty of care" on it. She took a break from acting to focus on it, and released The Thin Line, an album she is incredibly proud of. Following the release of the album, Peace performed in a number of festivals over the summer. The Thin Line tour, during which Peace and her band performed the songs from the new album, took place in October 2014. An acoustic tour followed in March / April and September / October 2015.

Peace announced her plans for an EP, as well as a European and a full band UK tour in Spring, 2016. In February 2016, Peace launched a PledgeMusic project for the release of her EP, Come Home. The support of her fans led to raising 75% of the funds in 24 hours, reaching the project target in under a week. The Come Home EP was released on 8 April 2016. For her EP, Peace chose to work again with her producer from The Thin Line, James Lewis, and has said he brings out the best in her. Peace described Come Home as a love story, from meeting to breaking up, in 20 minutes.

== Activism ==
Peace is a prominent supporter of LGBT equality causes. She is a patron of Manchester Pride and has recorded a video for Stonewall's "It Gets Better" campaign. She is involved in a number of related charities, including Diversity Role Models and the Albert Kennedy Trust.

Peace has hosted and curated her own "Heather Peace Presents" stage in several editions of Manchester Pride. In July 2016, Diva announced Peace as its new columnist. Peace said it was an honour for her to be part of a magazine that was relevant to her coming out.

In 2010, she was number 40 on the Independent on Sunday's Pink List, and number 10 in 2011. She was also voted number 18 on U.S. website AfterEllen's 2011 Hot 100 list. She is also the only woman to have appeared twice on the cover of Diva magazine in the space of six months.

== Personal life ==
Peace came out as a lesbian to her mother when she was 19 years old, shortly after she broke up with her first girlfriend. Peace publicly came out at the age of 34 after being threatened with being outed by a newspaper. She and longtime partner Ellie Dickinson entered into a civil partnership in 2013, and subsequently converted it to marriage in 2014. They have three daughters together.

In May 2025, Peace confirmed she was undergoing treatment for breast cancer.

== Filmography ==
=== Film ===
Year	Title	Role	Notes
2003	The Devil's Tattoo	Iona	
2009	31 North 62 East	Jill & Kimberly Mandelson	
2011	Screwed	Charlie	
2015	Never Let Go	Jeanette Burrows	
2021	The Lockdown Hauntings	Rachel Parker	
2023	Roses	Chris	Short film

=== Television ===
Year	Title	Role	Notes
1997	Emmerdale	Anne Cullen	5 episodes
1997	The Bill	Josie Clarke	Series 13; Episode 50: "You and Me Versus the World"
1997	Dangerfield	Girl in Pub	Series 4; Episode 2: "Perfect Witness"
1998–2002	London's Burning	Sally 'Gracie' Fields	Series 11–14; 56 episodes
2001	Thunder Road	Sonia	Television film
2002	Holby City	Gina Wilson	Series 5; Episode 8: "Ladies Night"
2003	Doctors	Jackie Summers	Series 5; Episode 9: "Black and Blue"
2003	Where the Heart Is	Susan	Series 7; Episode 7: "Coming Home"
2004	Down to Earth	Nicola	Series 4; Episode 4: "Can't Buy You Love"
2005–2006	Ultimate Force	Becca Gallagher	Series 3 & 4; 8 episodes
2006	Casualty	Viv Challoner	Series 20; Episode 24: "Out of the Past"
2006	Mayo	Ellie Waterstone	Mini-series; Episode 4: "Late of This Parish"
2006–2007	The Chase	Fiona Jones	Series 1 & 2; 19 episodes
2007	Empathy	DS Jo Cavanagh	Television film
2008	Doctors	Lisa Rush	Series 10; Episode 7: "Stabbed in the Back"
2008	Coronation Street	Ali	2 episodes
2008	Heartbeat	Janet Burr	Series 18; Episode 3: "Mother of Invention"
2009	Blue Murder	Sally Jowell	Series 5; Episodes 5 & 6: "Private Sins: Parts 1 & 2"
2010	Holby City	DS Karen Tate	Series 12; Episode 14: "A Glorious Reunion"
2010	Doctors	Emily Shepherd	Series 12; Episode 49: "Love Thy Neighbour"
2010	Accused	PC Lawson	Series 1; Episode 5: "Kenny's Story"
2010–2012	Lip Service	Sam Murray	Series 1 & 2; 12 episodes
2012–2014	Waterloo Road	Nikki Boston	Series 7–9; 48 episodes
2014	Prey	Abi Farrow	Series 1; Episodes 1–3
2015	Doctors	Claire Freeman	Series 17; Episode 101: "The Pain Barrier"
2016	The Coroner	Chrissy Woodward	Series 2; Episode 3: "Those in Peril"
2016–2020	Holby City	Alex Dawson	Recurring role; Series 18, 21 & 22; 5 episodes
2019	Silent Witness	DI Carey Murphy	Series 22; Episodes 1 & 2: "Two Spirits: Parts 1 & 2"
2021–present	EastEnders	Eve Panesar-Unwin	Regular role
2022	This England	Mary Wakefield	Mini-series; Episodes 1 & 4–6
2024	The Weakest Link	Herself	Christmas Special

== Discography ==
=== Albums ===
Title	Album details	Peak chart positions
Title	Album details	UK
Fairytales	Released: 20 May 2012; Labels: Kaleidoscope Records Ltd.; Formats: Digital download, CD	43
Live at the Jazz Café	Live performance: 27 October 2013; Labels: Kaleidoscope Records Ltd.; Formats: Digital download, CD	—
The Thin Line	Released: 9 June 2014; Label: Kaleidoscope Records Ltd.; Formats: Digital download, CD	56
Live in Brighton	Live performance: 31 November 2014; Label: Kaleidoscope Records Ltd.; Formats: CD	—
Hey Mayhem	Released: 12 October 2018; Label: Kaleidoscope Records Ltd.; Formats: CD, download	—

=== Extended plays ===
Title	Details	Peak chart positions
Title	Details	UK
Come Home	Released: 8 April 2016; Labels: Kaleidoscope Records Ltd.; Formats: Digital download, CD, Vinyl	—

=== Singles ===
Year	Title	Peak chart positions	Album
Year	Title	UK	Album
2000	"The Rose"	58	—N/a
2012	"Better Than You"	—	Fairytales
2013	"Fight For" (Jack Guy Remix)	—	Fairytales
2014	"We Can Change"	—	The Thin Line
2022	"Never Wanna Let It Go"	—	This Love
"—" denotes a single that did not chart or was not released.

== Awards and nominations ==
Year	Award	Category	Work	Result	Ref.
2022	Inside Soap Awards	Best Newcomer	EastEnders	Won	
2022	Digital Spy Reader Awards	Best Soap Couple (with Balvinder Sopal)	EastEnders	Second	
2023	Inside Soap Awards	Best Partnership (with Sopal)	EastEnders	Nominated	
2023	Digital Spy Reader Awards	Best Soap Couple (with Sopal)	EastEnders	Won	
