= The Lockdown Hauntings =

- Directed by: Howard J. Ford
- Written by: Howard J. Ford
- Starring: Tony Todd; Angela Dixon
- Production company: Evolution Pictures
- Distributed by: Altitude
- Release date: May 3, 2021
- Running time: 101 minutes
- Country: United Kingdom
- Language: English

The Lockdown Hauntings is a 2021 British horror film written and directed by Howard J. Ford and starring Tony Todd and Angela Dixon.

== Plot ==
During the COVID-19 lockdown in England, as we see aerial shots of eerily deserted streets, a number of women living alone and reaching out remotely to others via Zoom begin to wonder if their isolation might be making them imagine things. Unexplained things keep happening around them, like voices out of nowhere, and household items breaking on their own. This is because, as occult investigator Jordan Myers informs people viewing his online videos tells us, pandemic isolation mimics being alone inside a haunted house, creating conditions for ghosts to emerge. When some of the women begin getting mysteriously murdered, a female police detective named George Parker, who is also isolated and working from home, begins to investigate, and discovers the cause is the ghost a serial killer that had terrorized the area years before.

Before the final credits come up, on-screen text says, "This film was shot during the first UK lockdown for COVID-19 ... by one man".

== Cast ==
- Tony Todd as Jordan Myers
- Angela Dixon as George Parker
- Justin Hayward as Alex Briggs
- Heather Peace as Rachel Parker
- Russell Shaw as Linden Robbins
- Jon Campling as Doctor Clarke
- Sarah-Jane Potts as Nicola's Mum
- Megan Tremethick as Angelina Hale
- August Porter as Cindy
- Ayvianna Snow as Victoria
- Jon-Paul Gates as the Spitter

== Production ==
Evolution Pictures is a finance company and genre-movie production company whose worldwide sales are through GFM Film Sales. Evolution CEO Fred Hedman, the movie's producer, said the film was shot without COVID-19 insurance: “We were taking the risk, and our financier Head Gear Films took that risk with us". In December 2020, while still in post-productions, the film was picked up for UK distribution by Altitude.

Discussing the production, writer-director Howard J. Ford said: "I quickly realised that if I was going to pull this film off during lockdown, I would not be able to have anyone with me at all. That and staying two metres away from any actors it was really a challenge. Firstly, I needed to find out if actors would let me film in their homes and a social media post gave me my answers and who was up for it. Then I picked what I felt were the absolute best cast from that". Explaining how he was able to cast horror icon Tony Todd on such a small, low-budget film, Ford said:

I had met Mr. Todd on a flight to LA, by "chance" some years back; we were sat next to each other and we spent many hours talking about all sorts of amazing things. ... I had also soon after that worked with John Rhys-Davies on a Champagne film of all things and then found out they had the same manager, a super chap called Jeff Goldberg, so we reconnected; then when I was about to go forward with The Lockdown Hauntings and needed to cast Jordan Myers, the main paranormal expert, I kind of meditated over who would be the absolute best person to do this and I thought, "go big", then BOOM. Tony Todd appeared in my head and I thought, it's a long shot but what the heck, give Jeff a call, and it all fell into place from there.

== Release ==
The film was released in the United Kingdom and Ireland on 3 May 2021. In the United States, it was scheduled to be available On-Demand on 19 October 2021 and on DVD 16 November 2021.

== Reception ==
Rich Cross of Starburst awarded the film two stars. Ian Sedensky of Culture Crypt dismissed the movie as "scatterbrained claptrap that is dull as dirt", criticizing "a cast list overstuffed with a whopping 34 characters, which is about 20 too many for what should be a straightforward mystery". The "exposition jumps all over the place" and "it's impossible to tell anyone apart thanks to nearly everyone being blondes with no distinct features or known backstories". Archi Sengupta of Leisure Byte called it a "very cash-grabby attempt at a movie" and said that "the biggest flaw is the story. It's pretty bad. The central theme itself is kinda hilarious and the execution does no favours". Still, despite "a very small budget and a skeleton cast ... the cinematography is pretty great and the movie looks very artsy most of the time".

John Higgins of Film and TV Now, called it "A modern horror gem" and said it "harks back to the truly spooky elements that defined many a classic mainstream and indie offering, coupled with classic British genre TV like Children of the Stones and Hammer House of Horror". The review said Dixon "invests the right balance of courage and vulnerability".
