= Life Upside Down =

2022 film by Cecilia Miniucchi

- Theatrical release poster
- Directed by: Cecilia Miniucchi
- Written by: Cecilia Miniucchi
- Produced by: Carl F Berg; Jeffrey Coulter; Rose Kuo; Cecilia Miniucchi; Jason Rose
- Starring: Bob Odenkirk; Danny Huston; Radha Mitchell; Rosie Fellner
- Edited by: Anne Goursaud
- Music by: Erik Desiderio; Charlie Dobney
- Production companies: Europhia Films; Genoma Films; Johnny Fiction Entertainment; FR Productions
- Distributed by: IFC Films
- Release dates: September 1, 2022 (Venice); January 27, 2023 (United States)
- Running time: 92 minutes
- Country: United States
- Language: English
- Box office: $4,467

Life Upside Down is a 2022 American romantic comedy film directed and written by Cecilia Miniucchi. It stars Bob Odenkirk, Danny Huston, Radha Mitchell and Rosie Fellner.

Shot remotely during the early months of the COVID-19 pandemic in 2020, the film premiered at the 79th Venice Film Festival on September 1, 2022. It was released in limited theaters and video on demand on January 27, 2023. It began streaming on AMC+ in April 2023.

== Plot ==
In early 2020, an exhibition opening for artist and art dealer Jonathan Wigglesworth takes place in Los Angeles. He attends without his wife and meets his lover, lecturer Clarissa Cranes, as well as their friends, the Hasselberg couple. The exhibition is well-attended, and everyone is in good spirits, unaware that life-altering changes are about to unfold.

On March 16, 2020, the COVID-19 pandemic triggers a national lockdown in the United States, forcing Jonathan Wigglesworth, his wife, and his lover Clarissa Cranes, as well as Paul and Rita Hasselberg, into near-total isolation. Despite the enforced physical separation, Jonathan seems to continue his affair with Clarissa emotionally via social media and to gravitate toward her. His own wife remains, in effect, out of the picture, despite their almost constant shared apartment. The Hasselbergs appear to maintain a harmonious relationship during isolation, with Paul clearly being the intellectually superior man, and his wife seemingly unbothered by the lack of interest in his conversations. The characters cope with the drastic life change and the associated stress in different ways. Clarissa gives lectures via online teaching, which she seems to manage well, but Jonathan struggles to sell his artwork.

During the isolation period, the artist Jonathan slowly becomes estranged from his lover and, towards the end of the story, grows closer to his wife again. The lonely Clarissa, in turn, gradually distances herself from Jonathan and seems to find a shy messenger appealing. Paul Hasselberg discovers that his supposedly secure relationship was an illusion and that his wife is having an affair despite the isolation. They don't know how long the restrictions will last and, despite everything, seem to be coming to terms with it. The usually overly cautious Clarissa throws a small party with the messenger she finds attractive, disregards the isolation, dances with him, and seems to be beginning to let go of Jonathan. Jonathan reconnects with his wife, and the Hasselbergs realize that they need to address their relationship problems openly.

== Cast ==
- Danny Huston as Paul Hasselberg
- Radha Mitchell as Clarissa Cranes
- Bob Odenkirk as Jonathan Wigglesworth
- Rosie Fellner as Rita Hasselberg

== Music ==
As listed in the credits:

1. "Cecilia's Song" by Andy Summers
2. "Lil Bevans" by Rainforced
3. "Flow" by Rainforced
4. "Raccoon" by Rainforced
5. "Last Summer at Geofront" by Rainforced
6. "Thug Lo Fi" by Rainforced
7. "Strana Festa" by Me7ropolis
8. "Love is for the Dogs" by Land Locked Pirates
9. "Drinkin of You" by Land Locked Pirates
10. "Some of These Days" by Sophie Tucker
11. "Sully Droll" by Robert Dean
12. "Think You Are Mine" by Cristiana Di Palma
13. "OM" Mantra Chanting by Himalayan Monks
14. "Healing Mantra" by Buddhist Thai Monks
15. "Walk Through the Park" by TrackTribe
16. "Running Errands" by TrackTribe

== Production ==
Under the working title Worlds Apart, the film was shot during the COVID-19 pandemic remotely over Zoom in May and June 2020 in Los Angeles.

== Release ==
Life Upside Down premiered at the 79th Venice Film Festival on September 1, 2021. IFC Films acquired North American distribution rights and released the film in limited theaters and video on demand on January 27, 2023. It began streaming on AMC+ in April 2023.

In its opening weekend it grossed $2,419 at 27 theaters. It went on to make a total of $4,467 in the United States and Canada.

== Reception ==
On the review aggregator website Rotten Tomatoes, 5% of 19 critics' reviews are positive, with an average rating of 4.4/10. Metacritic, which uses a weighted average, assigned the film a score of 37 out of 100, based on eight critics, indicating "generally unfavorable" reviews.
