= Jeremy Morrison =

Jeremy Morrison may refer to:

- Jeremy Morrison (MMA fighter), opponent of Alex Stiebling
- Jeremy Morrison, character in Friends in Low Places (novel)

== See also ==
- Jerry Morrison (disambiguation)
