= Curfew (2019 TV series) =

2019 British dystopian action drama

- Genre: Action; Drama
- Created by: Matthew Read
- Written by: Matthew Read; Ben Hervey; Will Smith; John Jackson
- Directed by: Colm McCarthy; Christopher Smith; Brian Kelly
- Starring: Sean Bean; Ike Bennett; Michael Biehn; Adam Brody; Aimee-Ffion Edwards; Rosie Fellner; Phoebe Fox; Robert Glenister; Thaddea Graham; Guz Khan; Malachi Kirby; Adrian Lester; Andi Osho; Chris Reilly; Miranda Richardson; Richard Riddell; Jessye Romeo; Elijah Rowen; Clive Russell; Peter Sullivan; Jason Thorpe; Harriet Walter; Rose Williams; Billy Zane
- Theme music composer: Pye Corner Audio
- Opening theme: The Black Mill Video Tape
- Composers: Magnus Fiennes; Amon Tobin
- Country of origin: United Kingdom
- Original language: English
- No. of series: 1
- No. of episodes: 8

Production
- Executive producers: Will Gould; Matthew Read; Frith Tiplady
- Producers: Simon Maloney; Mat Chaplin; Suzanne Reid
- Cinematography: Carlos Catalán; Denis Crossan; Suzie Lavelle
- Editors: Sarah Brewerton; Ian Davies
- Running time: 42–46 minutes
- Production companies: Tiger Aspect Productions; Moonage Pictures

Original release
- Network: Sky One
- Release: 22 February – 12 April 2019

Curfew is a British dystopian action drama television series created by Matthew Read for Sky. Starring an ensemble cast led by Sean Bean, Ike Bennett, Adam Brody, Aimee-Ffion Edwards, Phoebe Fox, Thaddea Graham, Guz Khan, Malachi Kirby, Adrian Lester, Andi Osho, Miranda Richardson, Jessye Romeo, Elijah Rowen, Jason Thorpe, Rose Williams, Billy Zane, and Michael Biehn, the series premiered on 22 February 2019 on Sky One in the United Kingdom and Ireland. In limited areas of the United States, the entire series was released on 24 June 2019 by Spectrum as part of their Spectrum Originals video on demand branding initiative.

== Premise ==
In the near future, Earth is overwhelmed by an unstoppable virus of unknown origin. To protect the population from the virus sweeping across the United Kingdom] a totalitarian government impose a curfew in which anyone caught outside between 7pm and 7am will be put into quarantine, if not worse. Curfew focuses on a few lucky groups that are offered the opportunity to compete in an illegal 1,000-kilometre (620 mi) street race where the finish line ends in the ultimate prize: sanctuary.

=== Virus ===
The initial outbreak of a virus in Scotland was followed by its spread to the rest of the world. Those infected by the virus are mutated into fast, savage, and feral creatures, referred to as "mooks", that attack non-infected humans. "Mooks" have high endurance and speed, and can only be taken down by heavy arms fire or head shots. They have a severe sensitivity to ultraviolet light; they burn when exposed to it, so they hide during the day and come out to hunt at night. When the virus and the appearance of "mooks" started to impact everyday life, the curfew was introduced to keep people safe from the infected. In addition to the curfew, major cities, notably London and Manchester, have built walls and implemented checkpoints to control the public and limit the spread of the virus. Bridges across the Thames are also closed during curfew hours.

Because "mooks" can seemingly respond to certain subsonic frequencies, these are used to lure them away from populated areas.

The virus is transmitted by biting alone; being scratched by a "mook" does not result in infection, nor is the virus airborne. While a scratch is harmless, it does cause discomfort and mild nausea that is known to pass within a few hours. However, once bitten, an individual will quickly and painfully mutate. It is considered an act of mercy to kill the infected before they fully turn.

Unbeknownst to the public, the virus is actually a man-made agent rather than a natural phenomenon. It was originally designed for medical research into cellular regeneration but mutated unexpectedly during the first human trials in Scotland, with the subsequent outbreak occurring as a result of failed containment measures.

== Cast ==
=== Main ===
- Sean Bean as Errol "The General" Chambers (Note: Receives guest credit in episode 6.)
- Ike Bennett as Roman Donahue
- Adam Brody as Max Larssen
- Aimee-Ffion Edwards as Ruby Newman
- Rosie Fellner as Sylvie Chambers
- Phoebe Fox as Kaye Newman
- Robert Glenister as Jared Grieves
- Thaddea Graham as Hanmei Collins
- Guz Khan as Cheese
- Malachi Kirby as Michael Garwick
- Adrian Lester as Simon Donahue
- Andi Osho as Jenny Donahue
- Chris Reilly as Clarence
- Miranda Richardson as Lou Collins
- Richard Riddell as Kovacks
- Jessye Romeo as Meg Donahue
- Elijah Rowen as Zane
- Clive Russell as Mac
- Peter Sullivan as Sebastian Underhill
- Jason Thorpe as El Capitano
- Harriet Walter as Helen Newman
- Rose Williams as Faith Palladino
- Billy Zane as Joker Jones

=== Guest ===
- Michael Biehn as Roadkill Jim
- Josef Davies as Ewan
- Lola Shepelev as Little Girl
- Jemma Churchill as Mrs. Matuscheck
- Alfie Field as Linus
- Toby Woolf as Maxi
- Roshawn Hewitt as Henry
- Henry Moult as Ty
- Sophia Ally as Simone
- Douglas Hodge as Tom Weston
- Emily Reid as Jessie Brown
- Eleanor Scarlett Clarke as Connie Brown
- Martin Walsh as John Brown
- Ryan Pope as Officer Darby
- Joe Bannister as Peter Carter

Joss Carter, Fionn Cox-Davies and Danny Collins portray the creatures.

== Episodes ==
No.	Title	Directed by	Written by	Original release date	U.K. viewers (millions)
1	"Episode 1"	Colm McCarthy	Matthew Read	22 February 2019	1.01
Ordinary people compete for freedom in the world's deadliest street race.
2	"Episode 2"	Colm McCarthy	Matthew Read	1 March 2019	0.756
The race is on and the road ahead is packed with dangers. The Donahues face up to a huge setback. Then, things go wrong on the Thames.
3	"Episode 3"	Colm McCarthy	Ben Hervey	8 March 2019	0.706
London's huge wall presents the racers with another massive obstacle. Meanwhile, The General and Faith hatch a sneaky plan.
4	"Episode 4"	Christopher Smith	Will Smith	15 March 2019	0.544
Roman confesses to Meg the real reason they joined the deadly street race. Kaye and Michael clash over whether to fight or flee.
5	"Episode 5"	Christopher Smith	Matthew Read	22 March 2019	0.591
There's trouble when the Volvo and the tow truck crash. Lou and Ruby need spare parts. Fast. But they come at a steep price.
6	"Episode 6"	Christopher Smith	John Jackson	29 March 2019	0.619
The ambulance, hot hatch and Volvo race into danger as they chase the prison truck into Manchester's badlands.
7	"Episode 7"	Brian Kelly	Matthew Read	5 April 2019	0.515
Not far off the finish line, Kaye reveals a long-kept secret when she makes a shocking confession to Michael.
8	"Episode 8"	Brian Kelly	Matthew Read	12 April 2019	0.533
An act of sabotage causes all hell to break loose. From the chaos, the final contenders emerge.
