= Arena (magazine) =

British men's magazine

- December 2007 edition of Arena with David Beckham on the cover
- Categories: General male audience
- Circulation: 29,374 (2009)
- Founded: 1986
- Final issue: April 2009
- Company: Bauer
- Country: United Kingdom (Origin)
- Based in: London, England, UK
- Language: English
- Website: Official website

Arena was a British monthly men's magazine. The magazine was created in 1986 by Nick Logan, who had founded The Face in 1980, to focus on trends in fashion and entertainment. British graphic designer Neville Brody, who had designed The Face, designed Arena's launch appearance.

The headquarters of Arena was in London. The magazine was part of Bauer Media and featured articles on food, films, fitness, sex, music, electronics, and books. It was pitched at a similarly upscale audience to GQ, attempting to offer a more adult read than lad mags like Maxim and FHM, and gearing itself specifically towards the "black collar worker".

Arena launched the careers of British media professionals such as Dylan Jones, the editor of GQ UK who had served as Arena's editor in the late 1980s.

In July 2006, facing competition from the internet, the editorial team behind Arena launched a team blog which features regular posts from its contributors. In spite of this, magazine circulation continued to fall and in 2007, Giles Hattersley, chief interviewer at The Sunday Times was brought in as Editor. Hattersley oversaw a revamp of the publication and in November 2007, the magazine relaunched with a new design and new palate of content, featuring David Beckham on its cover. Hattersley returned to The Sunday Times in March 2008 and was replaced in the interim by deputy editor Mat Smith. Smith left in August 2008 to take over as features director at Esquire UK.

In April 2009, Arena ceased publication. As of April 2009, international editions of Arena outside the UK continued to be published. These editions included Ukraine, Turkey, Korea and Thailand. Arena Singapore, the first English language edition outside the UK, was launched on 27 October 2006 by the publishing division of Mediacorp. Two and a half years later, Mediacorp announced on 30 April 2009 that it was closing the Singapore edition of Arena.
