= Paulina Oduro =

Ghanaian highlife musician

- Born: Sekondi-Takoradi
- Citizenship: Ghanaian
- Occupations: Actress; Highlife Musician
- Notable work: Coming to Africa
- Children: Raymond Charles's Jnr

Paulina Oduro is a Ghanaian highlife musician, actress, talent show judge and stage performer.

== Early life ==
Paulina Oduro was born in Sekondi-Takoradi in the Western Region of Ghana. When she was seven years old she moved to Japan for two years with her father, a diplomat, and mother, and took lessons in playing classical piano until the age of nine. She travelled to London with her parents when she was 10, and took part in many school plays, acting and dancing. She became a qualified nurse a decade later, but at 21 years old, left this profession to pursue the performing arts and started singing professionally.

== Musical career ==
Oduro's singing career became commercial in the 1980s when she was introduced to soca music and reggae by musicians and bands she played with, including David Rudder and Arrow. She was part of the Casanova reggae band in 1982 which released the single "Loving You This Way" within a period of six months. Oduro went solo in 1999, launching her album, "Woman Power".

== Personal life ==
Oduro reportedly moved to settle in Ghana in 2009. Her grandson Carter is a famous footballer in Wales, United Kingdom. She claims to be the mother Teresa of Ghana. This is of course alleged.

== Performances for charity ==
Oduro has supported several fundraising and charity events with her performances. These events include Love Your World 5000 for Autism awareness, Dream Child African Renaissance Project and Grand Ball by MUSIGA.

== Natural Skin Tone campaign ==
Oduro has served as an ambassador for a campaign launched in July 2014 by Ama K. Abebrese promoting natural skin tones. She joins other famous women in Ghana, including Hamamat Montia and Nana Ama McBrown, as forerunners in fighting skin bleaching in the "I love My Natural Skin Tone" campaign.

== Filmography ==
- Coming to Africa (2020) as Akosua's Mom
- Love Regardless (2015) as Helen Tamaklu
- The Hero: Service to Humanity (2017) as Mrs. Boateng
- Chronicles of Odumkrom: The Headmaster (2015) as Naa Dede
