= Trevor Byfield =

British actor (1943–2017)

- Born: Trevor Mills Byfield; 20 October 1943; Redditch, Worcestershire, England
- Died: 11 October 2017 (aged 73)
- Other names: Zig Byfield, Ziggy Byfield
- Occupation: Actor
- Years active: 1967–2017
- Spouse: Janet Offor (m. 1966, divorced)
- Children: 2

Trevor Mills Byfield (20 October 1943 – 11 October 2017) was a British character actor particularly well known for his roles on British television. In many of his later roles he was credited as Zig Byfield.

== Theatre work ==
Prior to his work in television and film he appeared in several stage musicals under the name Ziggy Byfield. These included the 1970s production of Hair, where he appeared alongside Joan Armatrading, Richard O'Brien, Paul Nicholas and Floella Benjamin. He also appeared later in Richard O’Brien's The Rocky Horror Show.

== Television work ==
Byfield featured in many popular British television programmes over several decades, these included Heartbeat, EastEnders, Casualty, Holby City, Coronation Street, Family Affairs, Doctors, Only Fools and Horses, Inspector Morse (as the title character in the episode "Who Killed Harry Field?"), One Foot in the Grave, Birds of a Feather, The Professionals, Minder, Spooks, Lovejoy, So Haunt Me and New Tricks. He appeared in seventeen episodes of The Bill in fourteen different roles.

== Personal life ==
Byfield married Janet Offor in 1966 and they had two children together, but subsequently divorced.

== Accident ==
In January 2009 he suffered a broken hip and ribs as well as a collapsed lung, when a tractor that he was driving lost control on a road and hit trees before rolling down an embankment during filming of the ITV show Heartbeat near Grosmont. Four crew members were also hurt. Byfield was airlifted to hospital.

== Death ==
Byfield died from pneumonia on 11 October 2017, aged 73.

== Partial filmography ==
=== Film ===
| Year | Title | Role | Notes |
|---|---|---|---|
| 1982 | Who Dares Wins | Baker | |
| 1983 | Slayground | Sams | |
| 1989 | The Wolves of Willoughby Chase | Train Driver | |
| 1995 | GoldenEye | Train Driver | |
| 1999 | Nasty Neighbours | Car Salesman | |
| 1999 | G:MT – Greenwich Mean Time | Brian | |
| 2000 | Distant Shadow | John Clay | |
| 2009 | Dead Man Running | The Mark | |

=== Television ===
| Year | Title | Role | Notes |
|---|---|---|---|
| 1980 | The Gentle Touch | Taxi Driver | Series 1, Episode 4: Shock |
| 1980 | Minder | Billy | Series 2, Episode 10: Old School Tie |
| 1980 | The Professionals | King Billy | Series 4, Episode 2: Wild Justice |
| 1984 | Mitch | Williams | Series 1, Episode 5: Fit-Up |
| 1985 | Dempsey and Makepeace | Chentzu Spiceri | Series 1, Episode 2: The Squeeze |
| 1986 | C.A.T.S. Eyes | Harris | Series 2, Episode 2: Powerline |
| 1987 | Yesterday's Dreams | Don Ackford | 6 episodes |
| 1988 | Bust | Barry Donovan | Series 2, Episode 3: Weekend Break |
| 1989 | Birds of a Feather | Prison Officer | Series 1, Episode 2: Just Visiting |
| 1989–2008 | The Bill | various characters | 17 episodes |
| 1991 | Lovejoy | Jeff Diamond | Series 2 Episode 4: Montezuma's Revenge |
| 1991 | Inspector Morse | Harry Field | Series 5 Episode 3: Who Killed Harry Field? |
| 1991 | Only Fools and Horses | Eric | Series 7 Episode 3L Stage Fright |
| 1991 | Minder | Billy Meadows | Series 8, Episode 10: Too Many Crooks |
| 1992 | One Foot in the Grave | Salmon | Series 3, Episode 4: The Beast in the Cage |
| 1992 | Boon | Kevin Tracken | Series 7, Episode 10: Whispering Grass |
| 1993 | Between the Lines | D.I. Bruce Grange | Series 2, Episode 10: What's the Strength of This? |
| 1994-2008 | Casualty | Security Man/ John/ Don Harrikent | 3 episodes |
| 1995 | Taggart | Bob Rosen | Series 11, Episode 6: Black Orchid |
| 1996 | Crocodile Shoes II | Connors | 5 episodes |
| 1997 | Dangerfield | Jim Massey | Series 4, Episode 5: House Calls |
| 1997 | Holding the Baby | Nial | 1 episode |
| 1999 | City Central | Benny | Series 2, Episode 8: Northern Soul |
| 1999-2000 | A Touch of Frost | George English | 2 episodes |
| 2003 | Waking the Dead | John Nesbitt | Series 3, Episode 2: Multistorey Part 2 |
| 2003 | Holby City | John Palmer | Series 5, Episode 49: A Friend in Need |
| 2003–2012 | Doctors | Tom Irving / Buster Bevan / Tony Raynor | 3 episodes (including final acting role) |
| 2004 | Heartbeat | Don Megson | Series 14, Episode 4: The Happiest Day |
| 2007 | Spooks | Old Freak | Series 6, Episode 3: The Kidnap |
| 2008 | New Tricks | Clive Evans | Series 5, Episode 4: Loyalties and Royalties |
| 2009 | Lewis | Bone | Series 3, Episode 4: Counter Culture Blues |
| 2009 | Heartbeat | Harry Brown | Series 18, Episode 17: The War of the Roses |
| 2010 | Holby City | Alan Fiveacre | Series 12, Episode 45: Man with No Name |
| 2010 | EastEnders | Reg | 2 episodes |
