= Coming to Africa =

2020 Film

Coming to Africa is a 2020 African-American film directed and written by Anwar Jamison.

== Plot ==
Adrian, a financial philanderer, has spent his entire life chasing corporate success and shunning Black consciousness. His brother Buck unlike him is vocal and leads the black community through several engagements in a barbering shop. Adrian had some disappointment and discrimination and later found himself in Africa, Ghana to be precise. He met a young woman called Akosua who engaged him and changed his perception of Africa.

In a sequel released in 2023 Coming to Africa:Welcome to Ghana Adrian and Akosua have decided to get married and move to America together. Unexpected obstacles ensue which make things difficult.

== Cast ==
- Nana Ama McBrown as Akosua
- Anwar Jamison as Adrian
- David Dontoh as Monte
- Paulina Oduro as Akosua's Mom
- Khalil Kain as Buck
- Py Addo Boateng as Jojo
- Powwah Uhuru as Adonis
- Eva Danso Aikins as Bartender
- Everett Anderson as Jamaal
- David Caffey as Mr. Bickerstaff
- Mr. Deejae as Tony
- Sitsofe Tsikor as Front Desk Lady
- Georgetta Buggsas Dr. Floyd's Assistant
- Kwaku Brown as Kofi
- Lavelle Mays as Office Receptionist
- Antoinette Jamison as Woman in Office
- Brian Angels as Museum Guide
