= Ben Peyton =

British actor

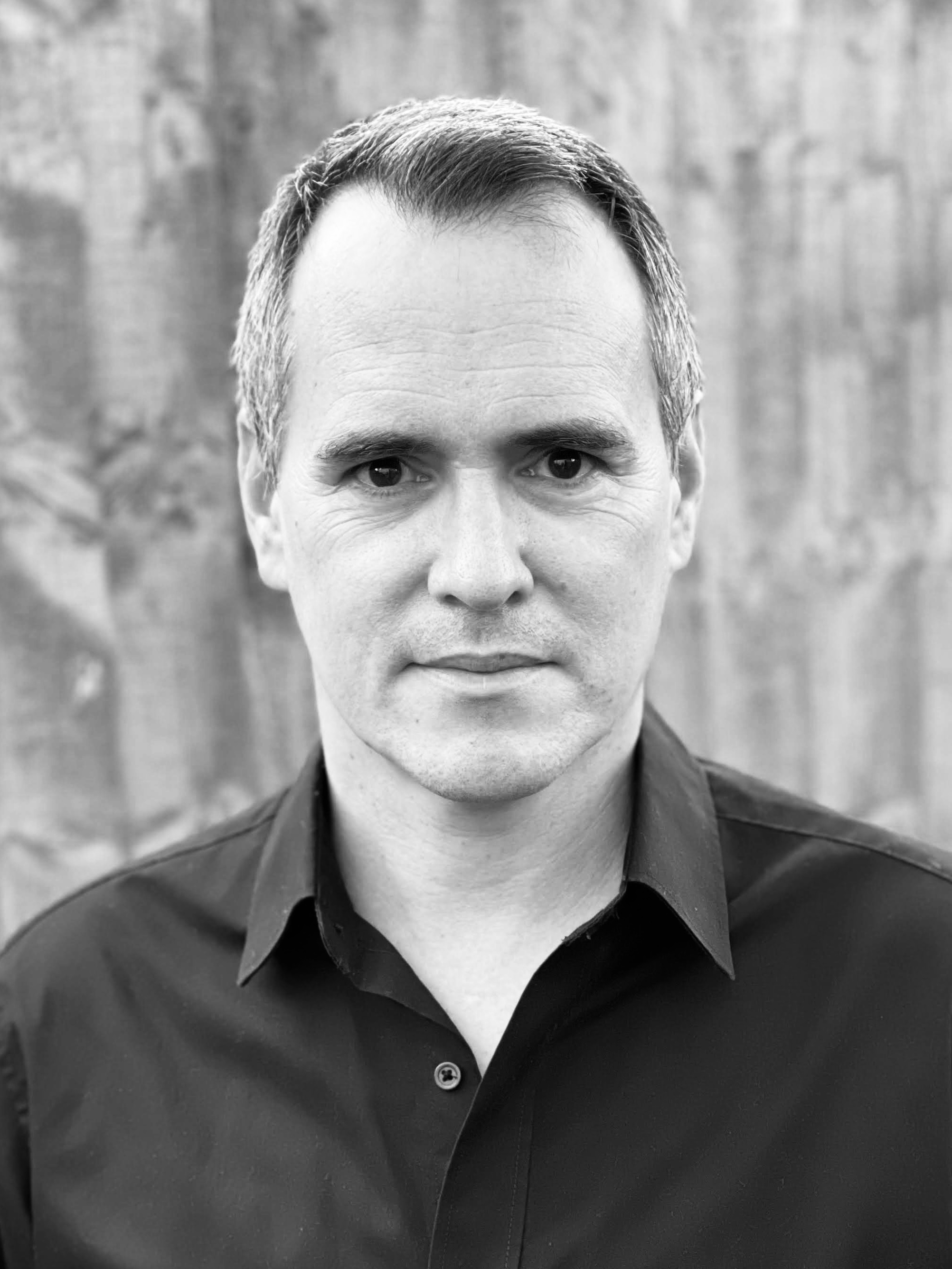
- Born: 1977 (age 48–49); Bath, Somerset, England
- Occupation: Writer

Ben Peyton (born 1977) is a British former actor best known for playing PC Ben Hayward in The Bill from 2000 to 2002.

Born in Bath, Somerset, England, he attended Millfield School in Somerset where he became National Schools Squash Champion in 1994 and 1995. After Millfield, he attended Guildford School of Acting graduating in 1998.

Numerous corporate videos and adverts led him to CITV show Welcome to Orty Fou, before landing roles in Band of Brothers, and a regular part in The Bill. Other credits included Emmerdale and Holby City. He also had a small role as a bridegroom in Bridget Jones's Diary.

Peyton stopped acting in 2006, although returned to the stage for lead roles in ART and Journey's End at Guildford's Electric Theatre.

In 2017, Peyton shared his memories of his time on The Bill and his career in general in the second episode of The Bill Podcast

In 2022 he published his debut novel, Luke Stevens and the Blood of St George, an action-adventure fantasy novel aimed at 10-15 year olds as well as adults.
