= The Forsyte Saga (disambiguation) =

The Forsyte Saga is a series of three novels and two interludes by John Galsworthy published between 1906 and 1921.

The Forsyte Saga may also refer to:

- That Forsyte Woman, 1949 American romance film based on The Man of Property, the first novel in the series
- The Forsyte Saga (1967 series), 1967 British television series based on the series of novels, and its sequel trilogy A Modern Comedy
- The Forsyte Saga (2002 miniseries), 2002 British television serial based on the first two novels, The Man of Property and In Chancery, and the first interlude, Indian Summer of a Forsyte, in the series of novels
- The Forsyte Saga: To Let, 2003 British television serial based on the last novel in the series, To Let
- The Forsytes, 2025-present British drama series based on the series of novels, re-focusing on the female characters

== See also ==
- "The Foresight Saga", an episode of My Hero
