= The Dead 2: India =

- Film poster
- Directed by: Howard J. Ford; Jon Ford
- Written by: Howard J. Ford; Jon Ford
- Produced by: Howard J. Ford; Amir S. Moallemi
- Starring: Joseph Millson; Meenu Mishra; Anand Krishna Goyal
- Cinematography: Jon Ford
- Music by: Imran Ahmad
- Production companies: Road Trip Pictures; Latitude Films
- Distributed by: Anchor Bay Entertainment
- Release date: 22 August 2013
- Running time: 98 minutes
- Country: United Kingdom
- Language: English

The Dead 2: India is a zombie horror film released in 2013. It is a sequel to, and follows up on the events of The Dead (2010). The Dead 2: India was produced by Road Trip Pictures in association with Latitude Films, directed by the Ford brothers, and stars Joseph Millson, Meenu Mishra, and Anand Krishna Goyal. In this movie, the action is set in the Indian states of Rajasthan and Maharashtra. The Dead In India had its world premiere at Film 4 FrightFest, held at London's Empire Leicester Square, on 22 August 2013, and was the opening film at Film 4 FrightFest.

== Plot ==
A ship named 'African Goddess' from Somalia, Africa docks at Mumbai, India. As the workers disembark and collect their pay, one is seen to be ill and injured on the elbow, that worker's name is Rajiv, one of the other worker asks the manager about Rajiv's whereabouts and gets to know that while leaving Somalia, a 'Mad woman' had bitten him. Behind the manager, the radio can be heard telecasting a news saying that 'It is not yet known about the reasons of the acts of cannibalism in Africa'. Meanwhile, Rajiv walks through the streets, through the crowds and into his rundown house, he sits down feverishly and soon dies. Now, his coming to India triggers a zombie infestation.

Far away from Mumbai in a village in Rajasthan, a man had died for unknown reasons, his wife puts a blanket over his face and finishes the rituals and goes and sits with her daughter and other villagers who had gathered, she mourns for her husband's death and then tells her daughter to go and fetch water so that they could cook, the daughter goes and starts collecting water in her pot, in another part of the village a woman is shown collecting dried clothes from outside of the house, suddenly a huge gush of wind arrives, and then the woman sees a person approaching her house from afar she is unnerved and quickly collects the clothes and walks back in her house, the scene switches to the little girl who was still collecting water but then she sees a person approaching her and screams all the villagers are alerted and they see a bunch of people creep out of the dark and approach the village, the woman who was collecting clothes was still unnerved a little, when suddenly, an old man breaks into their house and bites the woman's husband.

Ishani goes to a hospital for a check-up and sees many people with bite wounds. Meanwhile, as he is working atop a wind turbine, Nicholas sees a family evacuate their home in a hurry. Ishani phones Nicholas and informs him that she is pregnant, and she is worried about her safety with the incidents happening on the streets.

Nicholas phones his friend Max, who is aware of the fighting in the streets, but believes it to be fighting among two communities. Nicholas soon has his first encounter with the zombies and phones Ishani, promising to come for her. He phones Max again, who informs him that American citizens are being evacuated from India and asks him to show up at either New Delhi or Mumbai to escape from India. Nicholas instead keeps his promise to Ishani, going back to get her. He soon realizes that the dead are coming back to life. By the time Nicholas finishes his phone call, he is surrounded by zombies and gets trapped in a powered paragliding institute. Unable to get back to his jeep, he paraglides off the building to safety.

Nicholas crash-lands in a village and rescues an orphan named Javed (Anand Goyal) from zombies. Javed turns out to be a guide, and he offers to help Nicholas reach Mumbai. They take a car from the house of a dead local tour operator; Javed injures his hand in the process. They reach a military checkpoint and see military personnel killing people with wounds, so Nicholas and Javed take another route through the mountains, having to ditch their car after an accident on the road. They soon find a motorbike and hit the road again.

Meanwhile, the conditions in Mumbai are deteriorating rapidly. Ishani's mother is bitten and she is dying. Ishani's father, a preacher, starts believing that the end is near. The father and daughter bond again with death so near. Javed and Nicholas stop for food and their motorbike is stolen by a desperate man. Now on foot, they walk through the desert. Javed is rescued by the Indian Army and is separated from Nicholas. Nicholas finds the stolen bike and rides all the way to Mumbai.

Ishani's father gets bitten, and Nicholas finally reaches her house. Ishani's father now realizes that Nicholas truly loves his daughter. He allows them to go and stays behind to succumb to his wounds. Nicholas and Ishani reach a camp set up by the military where they find Javed. The camp is bombed by the military, and the camp building collapses. The movie ends with Nicholas, Javed, and Ishani trapped with their fates unknown.

== Cast ==
- Joseph Millson as Nicholas Burton
- Anand Krishna Goyal as Javed
- Meenu Mishra as Ishani Sharma
- Poonam Mathur as Ishani's Mother
- Sandip Datta Gupta as Ishani's father

== Production ==
The production encountered a few problems; most of the extras used for playing zombies were not proficient in English, so the filmmakers had to use translators to explain things to the extras. Joseph Millson also mentioned that they did not get a permit from the Indian Government to shoot the movie in India.

== Reception ==
The reviews for the film were mixed. On Rotten Tomatoes, the film has two positive reviews and two negative reviews.
