= 31 North 62 East =

Coordinates: 31.00°N 62.00°E

- UK poster
- Directed by: Tristan Loraine
- Written by: Leofwine Loraine; Tristan Loraine
- Produced by: Tristan Loraine
- Starring: John Rhys-Davies; Marina Sirtis; Heather Peace; Craig Fairbrass
- Edited by: Tristan Loraine
- Release date: 18 September 2009
- Country: United Kingdom
- Language: English
- Budget: US$3.1 million

31 North 62 East is a 2009 British independent action film co-written, produced and directed by Tristan Loraine. The title refers to a point in southwestern Afghanistan near Zaranj and the Iranian border.

It was written by brothers Leofwine Loraine and Tristan Loraine with the first draft of the screenplay being completed on 2 May 2008. Principal photography commenced on 21 July 2008 with Tristan Loraine as director and producer. The film cast includes John Rhys-Davies, Marina Sirtis, Heather Peace and Craig Fairbrass.

The production company was Fact Not Fiction Films and the director of photography was Sue Gibson, president of the British Society of Cinematographers (BSC).

The film music was composed by Paul Garbutt and David Leo Kemp and also includes an appearance by New Zealand born violinist/composer Fiona Pears.

== Premise ==
A British Prime Minister abandons the position of a Special Air Service (SAS) unit in Afghanistan to ensure an £80 billion arms deal goes through, thereby assuring his re-election. All soldiers in the SAS unit are thought to have died, until two months later, when one of them, a female captain, is found by Italian special forces and returns to the UK to investigate.

== Cast ==
- John Rhys-Davies as British Prime Minister John Hammond
- Marina Sirtis as Sarah Webber
- Heather Peace as Jill & Kimberly Mandelson
- Craig Fairbrass as Major Paul Davidson
- Nathalia Ramos as Rachel
- George Calil as Jacob
- Dhaffer L'Abidine as Thierry Leroy
- Ian Lavender as John Mandelson
- Mimi Ferrer as Hafida
- Kulvinder Ghir as Tariq Malim
- Elaine Tan as Mai Li
- Andrew Bicknell as Raymond Burton-Smith
- Ian Aspinall as Kaleef

== Filming ==
British filming began on 21 July 2008 in Horsham followed by various locations in West Sussex and was completed on schedule on 2 September 2008. This was followed by Jordanian filming which was completed in late September 2008. Filming was done using digital cinematography using a 4k Thomson Viper camera recording onto HDCAM SR tape. The film then went into post production, and was released in the UK in September 2009.

== Reception ==
The initial reception for the film was mixed. Press screenings shown in September 2009 produced mixed reviews. "Edgy political thriller – A film unafraid to confront the decisions made by the powers that be." "The overall acting is poor, the characters are two dimensional leaving you with no empathy for the key players and the storyline is fragmented. One is left with the feeling that the budget should have been used on acting school for the players and training for the director rather than on helicopter and fancy car hire."
