= Prince David Osei =

Ghanaian actor

- Born: 6 December 1983 (age 42)
- Citizenship: Ghanaian
- Occupations: Actor, model, producer, director, philanthropist
- Notable work: Fortune Island, Last Night, Hero, Forbidden Fruit
- Spouse: Nana Ama Asieduaa
- Awards: Best Actor at the City People Entertainment Awards.

Prince David Osei (born 6 December 1983) is a Ghanaian actor, model, producer, director, and a philanthropist. He has featured in many Ghanaian and Nigerian movies, including Fortune Island, Last Night, Hero, Forbidden Fruit, and others. He has also featured in a British movie titled The Dead.

== Personal life ==
Family

He is married to Nana Ama Asieduaa.

== Filmography ==
- Fortune Island
- The Dead (2010) as Sergeant Daniel Dembele
- Last Night (2015) as Bright Mensah
- HashTag (2018) as Bravo
- Fix Us (2019) as Greg
- Hero (2019) as Mobutu Sese Seko
- Sade (2020) as Prince David
- The Nanny (2021) as Jasper
- Charlie Charlie (2021)
- Things Fall Apart (2022) as Alvin
- Roommate Couple (2023) as Stanley
- Letters to Goddo (2024) as Morocco
- 13 Kinds of Women (2024) as Douglas
- Forbidden Fruit
- Flight by Night (2016) as Kwame

== Awards ==
- Prince David Osei has won the Best Actor at the City People Entertainment Awards. He has also won the award for Most Promising Act at the Africa Magic Viewers' Choice Awards.
- He won Best Actor for the Lead Role at the African International Film Festival Awards 2019 in Dallas, United States of America.
