= Rosie Fellner =

English/Irish actress and film producer

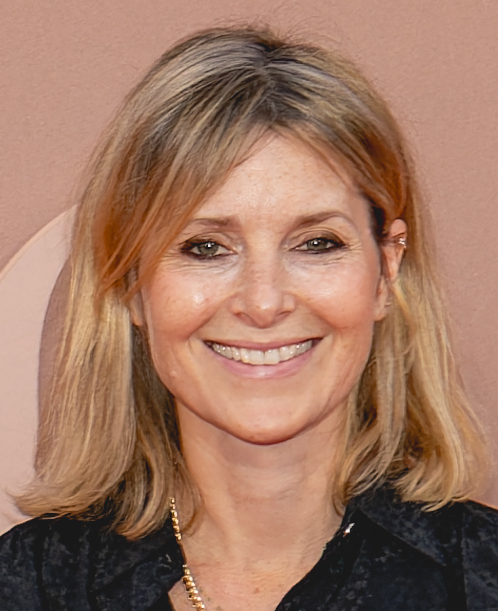
- Fellner in 2024
- Born: c. 1977; Galway, Ireland
- Occupations: Actress; Producer

Rosie Fellner (born c. 1977) is an English-Irish actress and producer based between London and Los Angeles.

She is the founder and currently runs her own production company, Rosebud Pictures.

== Early life ==
Fellner was born in Galway, the daughter of English parents Ruth Fellner and Vaughan Fell. After her parents divorced, her mother traveled her and her siblings throughout Europe. Finally landing in Spain, she learned to speak fluent Spanish and finished high school while growing up in Málaga.

As a child, Fellner was drawn to the stage and at age 15 joined the Turbozone International Circus Company as an acrobat on their European tour.

She continued her training at The Hub Theatre School in Cornwall and London International School of Performing Arts.

== Career ==
Fellner began her acting career on the cult comedy television series The Fast Show which gave her the opportunity to play various roles with Paul Whitehouse, Charlie Higson, Simon Day, and the rest of the cast, and received attention for her portrayal of Joei Harkness in the series The Alan Clarke Diaries. Further television credits include My Hero, The Eustace Bros., The Line of Beauty, The Trip to Italy, Liar, Ransom, Curfew, and Disney+ miniseries A Small Light.

Fellner also appears in many films including the role of Lucy in The Trip, directed by Michael Winterbottom and starring Steve Coogan and Rob Brydon, after the success of which Fellner completed her second feature with Winterbottom entitled The Face of an Angel. Other feature film credits include Two Days, Nine Lives, Age of Heroes, Two Jacks, and Heist.

Alongside her acting career, Fellner is also a producer and founded her own production company, Rosebud Pictures. Credits include short film Hit Girls and feature film The Uninvited, which premiered at South by Southwest in 2024 ahead of its worldwide release in 2025. Fellner also served as an Executive Producer on Bryn Chainey’s folklore horror Rabbit Trap, starring Dev Patel and Rosy McEwen, which debuted at Sundance Film Festival in 2025.

== Filmography ==
- 1999: Distant Shadow as Michelle Wallace
- 2002: Nine Lives as Emma
- 2011: Age of Heroes as Sophie Holbrook
- 2014: The Trip to Italy as Lucy
- 2014: The Face of an Angel as Katherine
- 2019: Curfew as Sylvie Chambers
- 2023: Life Upside Down as Rita Hasselberg
