= Joseph Millson =

English actor and singer (born 1974)

- Born: 27 April 1974 (age 52); Berkshire, England
- Education: Rose Bruford College
- Occupation: Actor
- Years active: 1995–present
- Spouses: Caroline Fitzgerald (m. 1999; div. 2011) Sarah-Jane Potts (m. 2013)
- Children: 2

Joseph Millson (born 27 April 1974) is an English actor, writer, director and singer. His first book, Work and Other Four Letter Words, was released in 2021.

Millson has recently moved into writing and directing. His first film, Care, won many awards at festivals. His first feature film, SIgns of Life, was scheduled for release in 2024–2025.

== Education ==
Millson trained at the Rose Bruford College of Speech and Drama in Sidcup, London. He gained a master's degree in screenwriting from Falmouth University in 2023.

== Personal life ==
Millson married singer and actress Caroline Fitzgerald in the summer of 1999. They had two children. In October 2012, it was reported by various media outlets that they had divorced.

Millson met his second wife Sarah-Jane Potts while filming for the BBC. The two married on 31 December 2013. Millson has a stepson, Buster, from Potts' first marriage to actor Tony Denman. Millson and Potts separated in 2024 and began divorce proceedings in 2025.

== Filmography ==
Television and film
Year	Title	Role	Notes
1996	La Belle Dame sans Merci by John Keats	Knight at Arms	Film
1998	In Exile	Raphael	1 episode
1999–2001	Peak Practice	Dr Sam Morgan	49 episodes
2001	Lily Savage's Blankety Blank	Himself	1 episode
2002	EastEnders	Jason James	6 episodes
2002	Holby City	Paul Fry	1 episode
2003	Doctors	Steve Parkinson	1 episode
2005	ShakespeaRe-Told	Billy Banquo	Episode: Macbeth
2005	The Ghost Squad	DS Vinny Thomas	1 episode
2006	New Tricks	Tom Christie	1 episode
2006	Casino Royale	MI6 Agent Carter	Film
2007–2008	The Sarah Jane Adventures	Alan Jackson	12 episodes
2007	Talk to Me	Woody	4 episodes
2008	Midsomer Murders	James Parkes	S 11 ep 6
2008	Harley Street	Jeff Turner	1 episode
2008	Survivors	Jimmy Garland	1 episode
2008	Telstar: The Joe Meek Story	Doctor	Film
2009	Ashes to Ashes	Dr Battleford	1 episode
2009	Comedy Showcase	Matthew Beer	1 episode, "Campus"
2009	Enid	Hanly Blyton	Television film
2010	S.N.U.B!	Bomb disposal NCO	Film
2011	Reunited	Martin	Pilot
2011	Campus	Matthew Beer	6 episodes
2011	The Romantics	Lord Byron	Film
2011	Mount Pleasant	Mark	1 episode
2011–2013	Holby City	Luc Hemingway	32 episodes
2013	I Give It a Year	Charlie	Film
2013	The Dead 2: India	Nicholas Burton	Film
2014	24: Live Another Day	Derrick Yates	3 episodes
2015	Banished	Major Ross	
2015	Penny Dreadful	Captain Branson	
2015–2020	The Last Kingdom	Aelfric	Recurring role
2018	AmeriCAN	Jim Mitchel	1 episode
2018	Tango One	Andrew Hathaway	Film
2018	Ransom	Keith Taylor	1 episode
2018	All the Devil's Men	Tony Deighton	
2019	Dragonheart: Vengeance	Darius	Film
2019	Angel Has Fallen	FBI Agent Ramirez	Film
2022	Moon Knight	Dr. Grant	1 episode
2022	Prancer: A Christmas Tale	Finn Wally	Film

== Theatre ==
Theatre
Year	Work	Role	Notes
1998	Black Comedy	Georg Bamberger	Comedy Theatre, London
2001	Four Nights in Knaresborough		
2003–2004	As You Like It	Orlando	Peter Hall Company; Nominated - Ian Charleson Awards
2004	The Lifted Veil		The National, London
2004	Pillars of the Community	Johan Torrensen	The National, London
2006	Much Ado About Nothing	Benedick	Royal Shakespeare Company
2006	King John	The Bastard	Royal Shakespeare Company
2009	Every Good Boy Deserves Favour	Ivanov	The National
2009	Hamlet		Stafford Castle Theatre
2009	The Priory		
2010	Love Never Dies	Viscount Raoul de Chagny	Adelphi Theatre, London
2011	Rocket to the Moon	Ben Stark	The National, London
2013	Macbeth	Macbeth	Shakespeare's Globe
2015	Mr Foote's Other Leg	David Garrick	Hampstead Theatre
2017	Apologia	Dual role of Kristin's sons	Trafalgar Studios
2019–2020	Mary Poppins	Mr. George Banks	Prince Edward Theatre
2024	The Forsyte Saga Parts 1 and 2	Soames Forsyte	Park Theatre, London
2025	The Forsyte Saga Parts 1 and 2	Soames Forsyte	Swan Theatre, Stratford-upon-Avon
2026	The Phantom of the Opera	Monsieur Andre	His Majesty's Theatre

== Critical reception ==
Financial Times critic in May 2006:

"I have seen actors from Alan Bates to Matthew Macfadyen play Shakespeare’s Benedick, but Joseph Millson’s performance in the new RSC production strikes me as definitive. Handsome in voice and in person, he can carry the audience on his roar and draw it into his hush. The elements of wit, anger and vulnerability are thrillingly mixed in this actor".
