= Stephen Tiller =

Australian rules footballer

Personal information
- Born: 26 March 1987 (age 39)
- Original team: West Adelaide
- Debut: Round 17, 2007, Western Bulldogs vs. West Coast Eagles, at Telstra Dome
- Height: 191 cm (6 ft 3 in)
- Weight: 87 kg (192 lb)

Playing career^{1}
Years	Club	Games (Goals)
2007–2009	Western Bulldogs	21 (7)
- ^{1} Playing statistics correct to the end of 2009.

Stephen Tiller (born 26 March 1987) is an Australian rules footballer for the Western Bulldogs of the AFL. The 54th overall pick in the 2004 AFL draft, Tiller was recruited from the West Adelaide Football Club.

Stephen Tiller was born in the town of Wanilla, near Port Lincoln in South Australia. Previously attending Cummins High School, he also has two older brothers.

Following several years of development playing for the former Bulldogs VFL affiliate Werribee, Tiller was called up for his AFL debut against the West Coast Eagles in Round 17, 2007. He was delisted by the Bulldogs on Wednesday 10 November 2010.
