= The Prime Ministers: The Pioneers =

- Film poster
- Directed by: Richard Trank
- Screenplay by: Richard Trank
- Story by: Richard Trank; Marvin Hier
- Based on: The Prime Ministers: An Intimate Narrative of Israeli Leadership by Yehuda Avner
- Produced by: Moriah Films
- Starring: Sandra Bullock (voice); Robert Cait; Michael Douglas (voice); Leonard Nimoy (voice); Steven Schub; Christoph Waltz (voice)
- Narrated by: Yehuda Avner
- Cinematography: Jeff Victor
- Edited by: Nimrod Erez; Kristie Fleming
- Music by: Lee Holdridge
- Release date: October 18, 2013
- Running time: 115 minutes
- Country: United States
- Language: English

The Prime Ministers: The Pioneers is a 2013 American documentary film about former Israeli prime ministers, directed by Richard Trank. It was based on the book The Prime Ministers: An Intimate Narrative of Israeli Leadership written by Yehuda Avner, a former Israeli diplomat and speechwriter to Levi Eshkol, Golda Meir, Yitzhak Rabin, Menachem Begin and Shimon Peres. Moriah Films, a division of Simon Wiesenthal Center produced it.

Review aggregator Rotten Tomatoes rated it 38% fresh based on 13 reviews, with an average score of 4.88/10. Douglas was awarded the Genesis Prize in January 2015 for his involvement in Jewish cinema and his work for world peace.

== Summary ==
Yehuda Avner narrates the incidents in the documentary. The early years of Israel are shown in lesser detail. Avner visited Harry S. Truman at his home to thank him for his support to Israel. The 1967 Six-Day War is also presented. A scene shows Levi Eshkol and Lyndon B. Johnson at the latter's ranch in Texas in January 1968. They both tend to a sick newborn calf. Terrorist attacks on Israel during Golda Meir's term as the prime minister and the 1973 Yom Kippur War were also depicted.

== Cast ==
- Sandra Bullock — Golda Meir (voice)
- Robert Cait
- Michael Douglas — Yitzhak Rabin (voice)
- Leonard Nimoy — Levi Eshkol (voice)
- Steven Schub
- Christoph Waltz — Menachem Begin (voice)

== Production ==
Simon Wiesenthal Center's founder and dean Rabbi Marvin Hier read the book and also advised Trank to do so. Impressed by Avner's work, Trank decided to make a film based on it and cast Avner as the narrator. For the historical footage the production team collaborated with some European and Israeli archives. A footage showing Golda Meir crying after she was chosen as the Prime Minister following Eshkol's death, was obtained from the Israel Broadcasting Authority. A few images of her with Israeli soldiers at the Golan Heights during the Yom Kippur War were also included. Trank intended to "highlight Eshkol’s role in changing the strategic relationship between Israel and the US." and present Golda Meir as "the woman and what she was up against — especially with the Yom Kippur War". Conversation between Richard Nixon and United States Secretary of State Henry Kissinger regarding Israel was also shown through the visuals of transcripts obtained from the Nixon Library.

== Release ==
It premiered in New York on 18 October 2013 and in Los Angeles on 6 November. A screening was conducted at Palm Beach Synagogue in November 2013 during the first South Florida Summit for Israel. Another screening was conducted at the Cleveland Museum of Art in January 2014. It was also screened at Westchester Jewish Film Festival in March 2014. The Jewish Federation of Las Vegas and the Simon Wiesenthal Center conducted a free screening of the documentary. The documentary was also screened at Fort Lauderdale International Film Festival.

== Reception ==
Joe Leydon wrote in Variety that the film was best suited for home-screen viewers. He criticized Trank and said that "[his] efforts to embellish Avner’s narrative" were "overbearing and distracting". Leydon called the voice-overs a mixed blessing and was critical of Bullock providing voice to Meir's clips. He cited the difference between their voices. He opined that the calf scene at Lyndon B. Johnson's ranch was like a "stranger-than-fiction episode". Steve Pond of TheWrap included the film in his 151 Oscar-qualifying documentaries list. Michael O'Sullivan wrote in his review published in The Washington Post, that a good book doesn't necessarily make a good movie. He criticized the static nature of the documentary and called the characterization a "doubly-edged sword". Gary Goldstein of Los Angeles Times called it a "smart and dignified presentation" but criticized the use of voice-overs and called them "unconvincing". The Arizona Republic's Kerry Lengel called the voice-overs undramatic, criticized the film for lack of proper research work and wrote that it came off as an "under-researched history gaping with holes". She opined that the documentary took on its subject "from a disappointingly narrow perspective".

The Seattle Times's John Hartl called the archive footage "fuzzy, scratchy and poorly chosen". He praised Waltz's voice-over but criticized the remaining voice actors. Hartl advised the viewers to see the 1960 film Exodus first. Frank Scheck of The Hollywood Reporter wrote that the voice-overs from well known Hollywood actors was "unnecessarily distracting" but opined that history buffs would find it fascinating. Nicole Herrington wrote for The New York Times that the voice acting was jarring when archival clips of the prime ministers in their own voices were included. Herrington criticized the film for not providing a balanced political view and said "[I]t’s an omission that feels like a missed opportunity." In his review published in the Slant Magazine, Wes Greene criticized the film for being overly patriotic and its loud "emotion-cuing" music. He added that if the "distracting slew" of voice-overs from well known actors had not been included, the documentary would have looked like a History Channel special. Now called it an "unabashedly pro-Zionist [documentary]" and said that it was "strictly for hardcore Zionists who haven't noticed that the Middle East is deeply contested terrain." National Post's David Berry wrote that it was "both tone-deaf and inert" and called the voice acting a "serious misstep". He concluded his review by writing that it "[felt] like your great uncle trying to remember the time he went to Disneyland’s Hall of Presidents."
