= Peter Polycarpou =

Cypriot actor

- Born: Peter Polycarpou; 31 March 1957 (age 69); Brighton, East Sussex, England
- Occupations: Actor, playwright, singer

Peter Polycarpou (born 31 March 1957) is a British Cypriot actor, playwright, and singer.

He is known for his theatre work and his roles as Chris Theodopolopodous in the BBC1 series Birds of a Feather (1990–1994) and Louis Charalambos in the film The Lost Honour of Christopher Jefferies (2014).

== Early life ==
Peter Polycarpou was born in Brighton in 1957 as son of a family of Greek Cypriots. Together with his sister Eve Polycarpou, he spent his first years in the St. Angela's Children's Home in Brighton. At the age of 6, he—along with his sister, moved back in with their family.

== Career ==
Polycarpou's work in film industry includes Evita (alongside Madonna) in 1996, Oklahoma! in 1999, and De-Lovely in 2004. On stage, he was the first actor to play the role of John Thomas in the musical Miss Saigon on the West End in London. He was an original cast member of the musical Les Misérables, being an understudy for the role of Enjolras while playing Jean Prouvaire (a role he reprised in 1995's Les Misérables: The Dream Cast in Concert). He later also played Grantaire and Thénardier. He has also played The Phantom in Andrew Lloyd Webber's The Phantom of the Opera. He has also appeared in the UK première of The Woods by David Mamet at the Finborough Theatre, London.

His work on television includes The Bill, Holby City, Casualty and Waking the Dead. In 1992, he sang the theme tune to Love Hurts, charting on the UK Singles Chart at number 26. In 1998 and 1999, he played Ali Hakim in Oklahoma! opposite Hugh Jackman as Curly McClain. He also played Dr. Neville Craven in the original West End production of The Secret Garden.

In February 2006, Polycarpou appeared in EastEnders, playing Yannis Pappas, father-in-law of character Carly Wicks (Kellie Shirley) for 3 episodes. He played a leading role in the movie O Jerusalem, released in 2007. He also starred in a short film Broken alongside Michelle Collins playing the leading role of Solomon. The film, about a Greek Cypriot immigrant family in 1960s London, ultimately won several international awards. He wrote and co-directed his own short film Mad George with ex-musician and long time friend John Hoare. The film has been shown at several international film festivals. Later he played Gash in Bryony Lavery's play Last Easter, directed by Douglas Hodge, at the Door Theatre in Birmingham, and had the leading role of Daniel Warshowsky in the musical Imagine This at the New London Theatre in 2008.

In 2010, Polycarpou starred alongside Sean Bean and Charlotte Rampling in the terrorist thriller Cleanskin, which was released in 2012. He also appeared in the eighth series of Hustle for BBC Television directed by actor Adrian Lester. Between 2010 and 2011, he appeared alongside Emma Williams and Michael Xavier in the Chichester Festival Theatre's Love Story. It later transferred to the Duchess Theatre where it had a short run. He also appeared at Chichester Festival Theatre between 24 September and 5 November 2011 – playing Beadle Bamford in Sweeney Todd (alongside Love Story producer Michael Ball as Sweeney Todd). He returned to Chichester in 2014 to star as Nathan Detroit alongside Sophie Thompson in Guys and Dolls. Later that year he played the Hollywood mogul Buddy Fiddler in Larry Gelbart's City of Angels at the Donmar Theatre, London. In 2015 he appeared in 9 episodes of the FOX TV drama Tyrant playing Colonel Mahmoud Al-Ghazi.

In September 2017, Polycarpou played Ahmed Qurie in J.T. Rogers's stage play Oslo at London's National Theatre, accompanying the production when it transferred to the West End in the following month. He was nominated for a Laurence Olivier Award for Best Actor in a Supporting Role for his portrayal of Ahmed Qurie at the 2018 Laurence Olivier Awards. In March 2018, Polycarpou played the fictional Palestinian detective Omar Yussef in two BBC Radio dramatisations of novels by Matt Beynon Rees. In July 2018, he narrated Raja Shehadeh's biographical Where the Line is Drawn: Crossing Boundaries in Occupied Palestine for BBC Radio 4's Book of the Week. In 2019, he played Sancho Panza in Man of La Mancha for English National Opera at the London Coliseum opposite Kelsey Grammer as Miguel de Cervantes/Don Quixote, Danielle de Niese as Aldonza/Dulcinea and Nicholas Lyndhurst as the Governor/Innkeeper.

In May and June 2026, Polycarpou joined the world concert tour of Les Misérables as The Bishop of Digne which included performing at the Royal Albert Hall. He will also star as Hercule Poirot in a theatrical tour of Agatha Christie's The Hollow.

As a playwright, Polycarpou has staged his plays about UK Cypriots searching for their roots and identity Searching for the Lemons and Cypriot Graffiti at Theatro Technis.

== Other activities ==
Polycarpou was once a member of the Green Party and stood for local election in the Muswell Hill ward. He is patron of the United Kingdom Thalassaemia Society and has run in the London Marathon three times. Polycarpou is also a drama teacher and has developed a one-day workshop which he teaches in youth theatres and schools throughout the UK. He has directed a production of the Les Misérables schools edition for the Act Too Youth theatre in Sussex, UK and the musical Rent.

Polycarpou is the patron of First Stages, a musical theatre youth group based in Devizes, Wiltshire. Polycarpou took an active interest in the Cypriot Film Festival UK. He has been a Director of The Royal Theatrical Fund since 2011. He has played cricket for the Lord's Taverners as a wicketkeeper.

== Stage credits ==
Year(s)	Production	Role	Notes
1985-1986	Les Miserables	Jean Prouvaire / Ensemble u/s Enjolras	West End
1986	Les Miserables	Grantaire u/s Enjolras	West End
1989-1991	Miss Saigon	John Thomas	West End
1991-1992	The Phantom of the Opera	The Phantom of the Opera	West End
1992-1993	Les Miserables	Monsieur Thenardier	West End
1995	Les Miserables	Jean Prouvaire	10th Anniversary Concert
1998-1999	Oklahoma!	Ali Hakim	West End
2000-2001	The Secret Garden	Doctor Neville Craven	West End
2001-2002	Cats	Asparagus / Growltiger / Bustopher Jones	West End
2003-2005	Chitty Chitty Bang Bang	Childcatcher	West End
2009	A Christmas Carol	Ebenezer Scrooge	Birmingham Repertory Theatre
2010	Love Story	Phil Cavilleri	West End
2010	Les Miserables	Pimp	25th Anniversary Concert
2011-2012	Sweeney Todd: The Demon Barber of Fleet Street	Beadle Bamford	West End
2014	The Pajama Game	Hines	West End
2014	Guys and Dolls	Nathan Detroit	Chichester Festival Theatre
2014-2015	City of Angels	Buddy Fidler	Off-West End
2015	Follies	Buddy Plummer	Royal Albert Hall
2016	Les Miserables	Monsieur Thenardier	International Tour
2017	Oslo	Ahmed Quries	West End
2017	South Pacific	Luther Billis	Cadogan Hall
2019	Man of La Mancha	Sancho Panza / Cervantes’ Manservant	West End
2021	Indecent	The Elder	Off-West End
2022	The Band’s Visit	Avrum	Off-West End
2022	The Light in the Piazza	Signor Naccarelli	Off-West End
2026	Les Miserables	The Bishop of Digne	International Arena Concert Tour
2026	The Hollow	Hercule Poirot	UK & Ireland Tour
