= The Prime Ministers =

Book about Israeli Prime Ministers by Yehuda Avner

- Author: Yehuda Avner
- Language: English
- Subject: Prime Minister of Israel; Levi Eshkol; Golda Meir; Yitzhak Rabin; Menachem Begin
- Published: March 15, 2010 by Toby Press
- Publication place: Israel
- Pages: 715
- ISBN: 978-1-59264-278-6
- OCLC: 758724969

The Prime Ministers: An Intimate Narrative of Israeli Leadership is a 2010 book written by Yehuda Avner and published by Toby Press. It documented events related to 4 Israeli prime ministers—Levi Eshkol, Golda Meir, Yitzhak Rabin and Menachem Begin. It was first published in Israel on 15 March 2010 and a wider publication was done on 1 September 2010. The book was well received by critics and was one of the finalists for the 2010 National Jewish Book Awards. In 2013, Moriah Films, the film division of the Simon Wiesenthal Center produced a two-part documentary based on the book that features Avner as the narrator, and Hollywood actors as the voices of Israel's prime ministers.

== Background ==
Yehuda Avner had served as Israel's ambassador to Great Britain, Ireland and Australia. He has also been speechwriter and secretary to Levi Eshkol and Golda Meir before becoming adviser to Yitzhak Rabin, Menachem Begin and Shimon Peres. He had also worked with Rabin when he was serving as an ambassador to the United States. Impressed by Avner's writing skills, Begin called him "[his] Shakespeare." During his service he made notes and recorded several important events and conversations.

== Summary ==
Avner wrote that the book was not a "conventional biography or memoir". Text from a condolence letter written by Jehan Sadat, Anwar Sadat's widow to Begin in November 1982 after the latter's spouse had died, was also included. Begin wanted to publish a memoir titled From Destruction to Redemption. He considered Henry Kissinger, the only United States Secretary of State who "ever truly understood the Israel-Arab conflict". During a diplomatic meeting in Israel, one of Kissinger's friend from his schooldays in Germany, greeted him. Instead of replying, Kissinger ignored him. Then his friend, a psychiatrist by profession gave Avner an analysis of Kissinger's psychology. He explained that though Kissinger presented himself as a man of strong will and self-assurance but he had "a tendency to paranoia, and an excessive sense of failure". He also asked Avner to inform Rabin that "deep inside" Kissinger was "an insecure and paranoid Jew." Avner also included account of his conversation with an English baroness who told him that Margaret Thatcher had Jews in her cabinet because she was "most comfortable among the lower-middle class." Though initially Avner hesitated to work with Begin, he considered him "exceptional" among all the 4 prime ministers discussed. Rabin advised Avner to work with Begin, as he was "[his] kind of Jew".

Eshkol, Meir and Rabin did not trust Abba Eban, Foreign Affairs Minister of Israel from 1966-1974. Eshkol even called him a "knowledgeable fool". He also said of him, "Eban never gives the right solution, only the right speech." Avner wrote that he was unhappy with his service under Peres. During the Yom Kippur War (1973), European social democratic governments did not help Israel and eventually Meir rebuked them during a Socialist International meeting after the war. When Begin ordered the 1981 bombing on the under construction nuclear reactor Osirak in Iraq, US president Ronald Reagan was surprised by the decision and why the Israeli government had not informed United States about its concerns regarding the Iraqi nuclear program. A paper detailing the plan, was prepared by the transition team but officials in the Carter administration were not able to inform their successors regarding it. A few days prior to Rabin's assassination, Avner questioned him why did he shook hands with Yasser Arafat. He replied that peace with him was a "long shot", that Israel's immediate neighbors—Egypt, Jordan, Syria and Saudi Arabia would be destabilized by Iran-sponsored Islamic fundamentalism. He explained that Arafat and Palestine Liberation Organization were the only hopes for a secular Palestine. The author had also included his biography in the book.

== Reception ==
David Rodman (Israel Affairs) opined that though the book was hefty, it did not provide much information regarding Israel's diplomatic history or foreign policy during 1960s–1980s. He praised Avner for "[painting] compelling and insightful portraits of the different philosophies, motivations and reactions" of the book's subjects. George Gruen (American Foreign Policy Interests) called it an "ultimate insider’s account", "an outstanding work of political analysis of the intricacies of Middle East politics" and praised Avner for portraying the problems faced by the Prime Ministers. He recommended this book to everyone who wanted to have a deep understanding of contemporary Middle East. Asaf Romirowsky (The Middle East Quarterly) wrote that "The Prime Ministers gave [...] special insights into the internal, as well as personal, workings of the Jewish state and is of particular value for understanding the nature and complexity of the U.S.-Israeli alliance." Donald Macintyre (Israel Journal of Foreign Affairs) called it an "important documentary source for future historians". He opined that direct speech was used excessively and a "more ruthless editor" could have done better.

The Prime Ministers was well received by politicians as well. Benjamin Netanyahu called it "fantastic" and Hillary Clinton termed it "a sweeping tome on Israeli politics and history." Manfred Gerstenfeld (Jewish Political Studies Review) said that a short review of the book was not justifiable. He wrote that readers who had a keen interest in Israel's history and politics would find the book very useful and of great value. The book was one of the finalists for the 2010 National Jewish Book Awards in the biography, autobiography and memoir category.

== Film adaptation ==
The Prime Ministers, a two-part documentary based on the book, was produced by Moriah Films, the film division of the Simon Wiesenthal Center and directed by Richard Trank. Part I, The Prime Ministers: The Pioneers was released in 2013. Yehuda Avner narrates the film, Leonard Nimoy provides the voice of Israeli Prime Minister Levi Eshkol and Sandra Bullock provides the voice of Israeli Prime Minister Golda Meir. Part II, The Prime Ministers: Soldiers & Peacemakers was released in 2014. Yehuda Avner narrates the film, Michael Douglas provides the voice of Israeli Prime Minister Yitzhak Rabin and Christoph Waltz provides the voice of Israeli Prime Minister Menachem Begin.

== Sources ==
- Gruen, George (2012). "The Prime Ministers: An Intimate Narrative of Israeli Leadership. By Yehuda Avner". American Foreign Policy Interests. 34 (3): 169–170. doi:10.1080/10803920.2012.686730. ISSN 1080-3920. S2CID 154180041.
- Gerstenfeld, Manfred (Fall 2010). "A Rich Retrospective". Jewish Political Studies Review. 22 (3/4): 137–140. JSTOR 25834909.
- Rodman, David (April 2012). "The Prime Ministers: An Intimate Narrative of Israeli Leadership". Israel Affairs. 18 (2): 313. doi:10.1080/13537121.2012.659083. ISSN 1353-7121. S2CID 216151208.
- Macintyre, Donald (2010). "The Prime Ministers—An Intimate Narrative of Israeli Leadership by Yehuda Avner" (PDF). Israel Journal of Foreign Affairs. 4 (3): 161–164. Archived from the original (PDF) on 26 January 2015.
- Romirowsky, Asaf (Winter 2012). "The Prime Ministers: An Intimate Narrative of Israeli Leadership". The Middle East Quarterly. 19 (1). Archived from the original on 10 July 2014.
