= My Life (Meir autobiography) =

1973 autobiography of Golda Meir

- First US edition
- Author: Golda Meir
- Language: English
- Genre: Autobiography
- Publisher: G. P. Putnam's Sons (US); Weidenfeld & Nicolson (UK)
- Publication date: 25 September 1973
- Publication place: United Kingdom
- Media type: Print (Hardback & Paperback)
- Pages: 396
- ISBN: 0-399-11669-9
- OCLC: 11866342
- Dewey Decimal: 956.94/05/0924 B
- LC Class: DS126.6.M42 A37 1975

My Life is the autobiography of the first female prime minister of Israel, Golda Meir. The book was first published on 25 September 1973 by Weidenfeld & Nicolson with the title A Land of our own and later by G. P. Putnam's Sons in 1975. The first German translation was published 1973 by the Scherz Verlag in Bern.

== Reception ==
The book became a New York Times best-seller. Its title is a double-entendre; It refers to both a life story and a well-known Jewish term of endearment. The book was well received by Kirkus Reviews who described the book as "both frank and very revealing of her personality and goals. Her total lack of pretense is especially winning. Meir's practical idealism can be seen in efforts as diverse as the beautification of kibbutzim and her strong advocacy of unemployment benefits. The work that 'most concerned and interested me,' she writes, was 'the translation of socialist principles into the down-to-earth terminology of everyday life.' Although the political events narrated are well known they are recounted with drama and spirit. Don't mistake this for just chicken soup with riposte-noodles: it's a model of its kind and a sure crowd-pleaser."

== Contents ==
List of illustrations ix

- 1. My childhood (1)
- 2. A political adolescence (16)
- 3. I choose Palestine (36)
- 4. The start of a new life (56)
- 5. Pioneers and problems (77)
- 6. 'We shall fight Hitler' (103)
- 7. The struggle against the British (131)
- 8. We have our state (164)
- 9. Minister to Moscow (201)
- 10. The right to exist (234)
- 11. African and other friendships (263)
- 12. We are alone (291)
- 13. The prime minister (318)
- 14. The Yom Kippur War (353)
- 15. The end of the road (382)

Index (391)
