= Devorah Blachor =

American writer

- Born: New York, U.S.
- Occupation: Writer
- Notable work: The Feminist's Guide to Raising a Little Princess (2017)
- Spouse: Matt Rees
- Website: devorahblachor.com

Devorah Blachor is an American writer, journalist, humorist and essayist who was born in New York.

Blachor wrote the "Coming to America" parenting column for The New York Times Motherlode and also writes for The Washington Post, The Huffington Post, McSweeney’s, U.S. News & World Report, The Hairpin, Redbook, Good Housekeeping and The Rumpus. Her "Motherlode" article "Turn Your Princess-Obsessed Toddler into a Feminist in Eight Easy Steps" went viral in 2014 and was the basis for the book The Feminist's Guide to Raising a Little Princess: How to Raise a Little Girl Who's Authentic, Joyful and Fearless-Even if She Refuses to Wear Anything But a Pink Tutu (2017). Kirkus Reviews wrote of The Feminist's Guide to Raising a Little Princess: "Humor abounds in this semicheeky examination of the pink world of princesses and little girls."

Blachor's McSweeney's satire I Don't Hate Women Candidates – I Just Hated Hillary and Coincidentally I'm Starting to Hate Elizabeth Warren appeared in early 2019. Blachor adopted the voice of a male voter, which Heidi Stevens in the Chicago Tribune described as "rings laugh-so-you-don’t-cry true".

Raised in an Orthodox Jewish community, Blachor is married to the Welsh novelist Matt Rees. and lives in Luxembourg.

== Publications ==
- The Feminist's Guide to Raising a Little Princess: How to Raise a Little Girl Who's Authentic, Joyful and Fearless – Even if She Refuses to Wear Anything But a Pink Tutu (Penguin Tarcher, 2017, ISBN 9780143130352)
