= Omar Yussef =

Fictional character created by Matt Beynon Rees

- First appearance: The Collaborator of Bethlehem
- Last appearance: The Fourth Assassin
- Created by: Matt Rees

In-universe information
- Gender: Male
- Occupation: Teacher, Amateur detective
- Nationality: Palestinian

Omar Yussef is a fictional character and the hero of a series of crime novels by Welsh writer Matt Rees.

== Character biography ==
=== Early life ===
According to the novels, Omar Yussef Subhi Sirhan, also known as Abu Ramiz (the father of Ramiz), was born in 1948 in Malha, a destroyed Palestinian village south of Jerusalem (The Collaborator of Bethlehem, Soho Crime, New York, February 2007). His father, the village mukhtar, or headman, fled with his family and the other villagers, on the creation of the Israeli state in the spring of that year. The Sirhan family went to the Dehaisha Refugee Camp, set up in fields south of Bethlehem. Omar's father rented a home, and Omar continues to lease the same stone house.

=== Career ===
Omar attended Damascus University and became involved in student politics. It was at University that he met Khamis Zeydan, a young Palestinian nationalist and a refugee from the coastal town of Jaffa, who later became police chief in Bethlehem. Omar's adherence to the Pan-Arab Ba'ath Party earned him the suspicion of the Jordanian regime. In early 1967 Omar was arrested by Jordanian police in Bethlehem and accused of murder. Omar later said the charges were false and that he had been jailed by political opponents eager to smear him (A Grave in Gaza, Soho Crime, New York, February 2008).

While traveling home at the end of the university semester in 1968, Omar met Maryam Hassan. Maryam was an educated young woman from a prominent family in the village of Mash’had outside Nazareth. She had relatives in the Bethlehem area and was on her way to visit them, when she encountered Omar in a taxi near the West Bank town of Jenin. They were married the following year.

On his return from university, Omar abandoned politics in favor of a quiet career as a history teacher. He taught at the school run by the Freres of St. John de la Salle in Bethlehem until the early 1990s. The school's pupils were drawn from the local Muslim and Christian populations. He was forced out of the school after a confrontation with a local schools inspector who considered Omar too critical of the new Palestinian Authority. Omar took a job at the United Nations Relief and Works Basic School for Girls in Dehaisha camp. The job was a step down in prestige from the Freres School, but it drew Omar into closer contact with the poorest refugees of Bethlehem and alerted him to their sufferings. Eventually this led him to reject the quiet life he had led and to attempt to confront the corruption and violence that engulfed his town.

=== Family and health ===
Omar and Maryam have three sons. Ramiz, the eldest, runs a cellphone business in Bethlehem. He's married to Sara and has three children, Nadia (Omar's favorite grandchild), Little Omar, and Reem. Omar's second son, Zuheir, lives in Britain, where he teaches Islamic history at the University of Wales. The youngest son, Ala, is a computer salesman in New York.

Since his student days, Omar had been a heavy drinker and a compulsive smoker. Health problems in his mid-forties forced him to quit both. He continues to be in poor health, however, with shaking hands and arthritic joints.

== Novels ==
- The Collaborator of Bethlehem (2007, also published as The Bethlehem Murders)
- A Grave in Gaza (2008)
- The Samaritan's Secret (2009)
- The Fourth Assassin (2010)

International titles

- "The Collaborator of Bethlehem" (Soho Crime, New York 2007) ISBN 1-56947-442-7
- "Le collaborateur de Bethléem" (Albin Michel, Paris 2007) ISBN 978-2-226-17718-6
- "Il Maestro di Betlemme" (Cairo, Milano 2007) ISBN 978-88-6052-085-2
- "The Bethlehem Murders" (Atlantic, London 2007) ISBN 1-84354-592-6

== Publishing history ==
The first of the Omar Yussef Mysteries is The Collaborator of Bethlehem (published in the UK as The Bethlehem Murders), which was published in English in 2007.

It was published in the U.S. by Soho Press, in hardback in the United Kingdom and Commonwealth by Atlantic Books and elsewhere. The New York Times called The Collaborator of Bethlehem, the first of the Omar Yussef books, “an astonishing first novel.” The Independent (London) hailed Omar as “the next big sleuth in crime fiction.” Le Figaro called the book “a masterpiece.” The books have sold in 14 different countries and 12 different languages.

The second Omar Yussef novel is A Grave in Gaza (published in the UK as The Saladin Murders by Atlantic Books in January 2008). The third, The Samaritan's Secret, set in Nablus, was published in the UK by Atlantic Books and in the US by SoHo Press in February 2009.

As of 2009, one or more of the novels had been published in 22 countries, and translations were available in languages including French, German, Italian and Indonesian.

== Adaptation ==
In 2018, The Bethlehem Murders and The Samaritan's Secret were dramatised for BBC Radio, with Peter Polycarpou as Yussef.
