= Yehuda Avner =

Israeli prime ministerial advisor, diplomat, and author

- יְהוּדָה אַבְנֵר
- Born: Yehuda Haffner; December 30, 1928; Manchester, England
- Died: March 24, 2015 (aged 86); Jerusalem, Israel
- Occupations: Israeli Prime Ministerial Advisor, Diplomat & Author
- Spouse: Mimi Cailingold (m. 1953)
- Writing career
- Notable works: The Young Inheritors: A Portrait of Israel's Children, 1982; The Prime Ministers: An Intimate Narrative of Israeli Leadership, 2010; The Ambassador, 2015

Yehuda Avner (Hebrew: יְהוּדָה אַבְנֵר; December 30, 1928 – March 24, 2015) was an Israeli prime ministerial advisor, diplomat, and author. He served as Speechwriter and Secretary to Israeli Prime Ministers Golda Meir and Levi Eshkol, and as Advisor to Israeli Prime Ministers Yitzhak Rabin, Menachem Begin, and Shimon Peres. Avner served in diplomatic positions at the Israeli Consulate in New York, and the Israeli Embassy to the US in Washington, D.C., and as Israel's Ambassador to Britain, Ireland and Australia. In 2010, he turned his insider stories about Israeli politics and diplomacy into a bestselling book, The Prime Ministers, which subsequently became the basis for a two-part documentary movie. In 2015, his novel, The Ambassador, which Avner co-authored with thriller writer Matt Rees, was posthumously published.

== Biography ==
Lawrence Haffner (later Yehuda Avner) was born in Manchester, England in 1928. He was active in the religious Zionist youth movement, Bnei Akiva, and was committed to helping build a Jewish state. In The Prime Ministers, he recalls the anti-Semitism he saw and experienced in Britain, including anti-Semitic rioting in the aftermath of the Sergeants affair. Upon high school graduation, he moved to Jerusalem, then part of British Mandatory Palestine in November 1947.

Avner fought in the Siege of Jerusalem during Israel's 1948 War of Independence. In 1949, he was amongst the founders of Kibbutz Lavi, a religious kibbutz located in Israel's Galilee region. He temporarily moved back to Britain to work for the Bnei Akiva movement as National Director ("Mazkir"). In 1953, he married Mimi Cailingold, a fellow British Jewish immigrant who was the sister of Esther Cailingold. He returned to Israel with his wife in 1954. The couple had four children.

== Diplomatic career ==
Avner returned to and settled in Jerusalem in 1956, and joined the Israeli Foreign Service in 1958. For the next 25 years, he worked for five Israeli prime ministers: as Speechwriter and Secretary to Prime Ministers Levi Eshkol and Golda Meir, and as Advisor to Prime Ministers Yitzhak Rabin, Menachem Begin, and Shimon Peres. As a top political aide, Avner was privy to the inside workings of Israel's prime minister's office, and was present for major decision-making moments, including Operation Entebbe, Operation Opera, and the signing of the Egypt–Israel peace treaty. Avner served as press secretary, official notetaker, and liaison between the prime ministers of Israel and Rabbi Menachem Mendel Schneerson. Avner documented many of these conversations, and later published some of the unclassified discussions.

Avner served in diplomatic positions at the Israeli Consulate in New York, and the Israeli Embassy to the US in Washington, D.C. In 1983, he was appointed Ambassador to Britain and Non-resident Ambassador to Ireland. He returned to Israel in 1988, before serving as Ambassador to Australia between 1992 and 1995.

== Books ==
In 1992, Avner, together with photographer Gemma Levine, published The Young Inheritors: A Portrait of Israel's Children.

In 2010, Avner turned his insider stories of working in the upper echelons of Israeli politics and international diplomacy into a bestselling book, The Prime Ministers: An Intimate Narrative of Israeli Leadership. Hillary Clinton called the book "a sweeping tome of Israeli politics and history." Benjamin Netanyahu described it as "a fascinating account of someone who was an eye witness to many historic moments in the history of the Jewish state...provid[ing] insight into the actions of our nation's leaders and offer[ing] important lessons for the future." The Jerusalem Post called the book "the ultimate insider's account".

In the final months of his life, Avner collaborated with thriller writer Matt Rees on The Ambassador, an alternate history novel that explores the question, "What if Israel had been established in 1938 instead of 1948?" The Jerusalem Post called the book "a compelling, intricately plotted page-turner that deftly combines well-researched historical detail, Avner's vast experience in diplomatic circles and Rees's finely tuned storytelling skills."

Both The Prime Ministers: An Intimate Narrative of Israeli Leadership and The Ambassador were Finalists for the National Jewish Book Award.

== Movies ==
In 2013 and 2014, Academy Award-winning Moriah Films, a division of the Simon Wiesenthal Center, produced two documentaries based on Avner's book: The Prime Ministers I: The Pioneers, which focuses on Yehuda Avner's time working with Israeli Prime Ministers Eshkol and Meir, and The Prime Ministers II: Soldiers and Peacemakers, which focuses on his time serving Israeli Prime Ministers Rabin and Begin. The movies are narrated by Avner, and star Hollywood actors Christoph Waltz, Sandra Bullock, Michael Douglas, and Leonard Nimoy as the voices of Israel's prime ministers.

The New York Times called The Prime Ministers I: The Pioneers "a vivid insider's perspective." The Los Angeles Times described it as "[a] smart and dignified presentation." The Hollywood Reporter called it "a vividly personal account of the country's travails during some of its most tumultuous times."

The Los Angeles Times called The Prime Ministers II: Soldiers & Peacemakers "a West Wing-esque behind-the-scenes look at key historical events." The Jerusalem Post described it as follows: "Expertly interweaving Avner's astute commentary with spellbinding archival footage, the film is a must for any student of Israel's storied past."

== Awards and recognition ==
Avner was a fellow of the Jerusalem Center for Public Affairs, a member of the Ambassadorial Appointments Committee, and a member of the International Advisory Board of NGO Monitor. In 1995, the Yehuda Avner Chair in Religion and Politics was established at Bar-Ilan University, Ramat Gan, Israel. In 2012, Avner received an honorary doctorate from Yeshiva University and presented the university's commencement's keynote address.

== Death ==
Avner died on March 24, 2015, from cancer at the age of 86. In memoriam, Asher Cailingold writes about Avner's last years: "His retirement years were spent in voluntary activities, serving on the boards of several national charities and involving himself in the needs of underprivileged groups".
