= Matt Rees =

Welsh novelist and journalist

Matthew Beynon Rees is a Welsh novelist and journalist. He is the author of The Palestine Quartet, a series of crime novels about Omar Yussef, a Palestinian sleuth, and of historical novels and thrillers. He is the winner of a Crime Writers' Association Dagger for his crime fiction in the UK and a finalist for the National Jewish Book Award for fiction in the US.

His first book was a work of nonfiction, Cain's Field: Faith, Fratricide, and Fear in the Middle East in 2004 (Free Press), about Israeli and Palestinian societies.

The New York Times called The Collaborator of Bethlehem, the first of his Palestinian crime novels about Bethlehem sleuth Omar Yussef, "an astonishing first novel." 'Le Figaro called the book "a masterpiece." Rees's writing has been compared with the work of Graham Greene, John le Carré, Georges Simenon and Henning Mankell. The French magazine L'Express called him "the Dashiell Hammett of Palestine." Rees's books have sold in 25 languages.

Rees was born in Newport, Wales. As a journalist, Rees covered the Middle East and lived in Jerusalem for 20 years. He was TIME's Jerusalem bureau chief from 2000 until 2006, writing award-winning stories about the Palestinian intifada. He also worked as Middle East correspondent for The Scotsman and Newsweek. He is married to the American humorist and author Devorah Blachor.

== Books ==
Rees published a nonfiction account of Israeli and Palestinian society called Cain's Field: Faith, Fratricide, and Fear in the Middle East in 2004 (Free Press). His first crime novel, The Collaborator of Bethlehem (UK title The Bethlehem Murders), was published in the US in February 2007 and is set in Bethlehem, West Bank, against the backdrop of the Palestinian intifada. It involves the gangs of gunmen operating in the town and the situation of the Christian Palestinian minority. It won the Crime Writers Association John Creasey New Blood Dagger in 2008, was also named one of the Top 10 Mysteries of the Year by Booklist, and in the UK Sir David Hare made it his Book of the Year in The Guardian. His sleuth Omar Yussef was called "Philip Marlowe fed on hummus" by one reviewer and "Yasser Arafat meets Miss Marple" by another.

The second book in the series, A Grave in Gaza, appeared in 2008 (under the title The Saladin Murders in the UK). Omar Yussef travels to Gaza, where he struggles against corrupt security chiefs who are smuggling weapons. The Bookseller called it "a cracking, atmospheric read." The third book in the series, The Samaritan's Secret, was published in 2009. Set in Nablus, it takes place against the backdrop of the city's ancient casbah and the small community of Samaritans still living on a hilltop overlooking the West Bank town. The New Republic called it "a wonderful detective thriller." Rees's fourth novel, The Fourth Assassin, appeared in 2010 and showed Omar Yussef to be "one of the most beguiling of current sleuths", according to The Sunday Times. Omar goes to New York for a UN conference and uncovers an assassination plot.

The Palestine Quartet novels approach the Middle East conflict from an often unexpected direction. There are almost no Israeli characters, and the novels maintain a focus on Palestinian society, good and bad. Rees has written that this perspective was dictated by his discontent with news reporting of the conflict, which focused on stereotypes of Palestinians as either terrorists or victims. Instead, Rees writes, the diversity of Palestinian society awakened him creatively and made him look at the Middle East from a different angle. For example, Gaza "is the most beautiful spot imaginable", he has said.

Mozart's Last Aria, published in 2011, is a historical crime novel set in Vienna in 1791. Nannerl Mozart, the great composer's sister, comes to the Imperial capital to investigate Wolfgang's death. She uncovers a plot involving illegal Masonic meetings, espionage, and a secret hidden in her brother's last great opera The Magic Flute. The book is based on real historical research into Mozart's last days. A Name in Blood follows the mysterious disappearance and death of the Italian artist Caravaggio. Like Mozart's Last Aria, A Name in Blood takes a real historical mystery and new historical research to create a fictional account of what might have happened. The Bookbag recommended A Name in Blood "even if you're art-averse." Rees learned to play piano as part of his research for Mozart's Last Aria. Working on A Name in Blood, he learned to paint with oils and to duel using a seventeenth-century rapier.

The Ambassador, published in 2015, was co-written by Rees and Yehuda Avner, a former adviser to Israeli prime ministers. The book's premise was that Israel was founded in 1938 and the main character is the new state's ambassador to Hitler's Berlin. During the writing of the book, Avner was dying of cancer. Rees has described how the experience of writing a thriller with a man suffering a terminal illness was fulfilling for him and Avner. The book was a finalist for the National Jewish Book Award for Fiction.

== Publishing history ==
=== Nonfiction ===
- Cain's Field: Faith, Fratricide, and Fear in the Middle East 2004 (Free Press).

=== The Palestine Quartet (Omar Yussef novels) ===
- The Collaborator of Bethlehem (The Bethlehem Murders) 2007
- A Grave in Gaza (The Saladin Murders) 2008
- The Samaritan's Secret 2009
- The Fourth Assassin 2010

=== Historical mystery novels ===
- Mozart's Last Aria 2011
- A Name in Blood 2012

=== Alternative history novels ===
- The Ambassador 2015

=== Thrillers ===
- The Damascus Threat 2016
- China Strike 2017
