= Golda Meir =

Prime Minister of Israel from 1969 to 1974

- גולדה מאיר
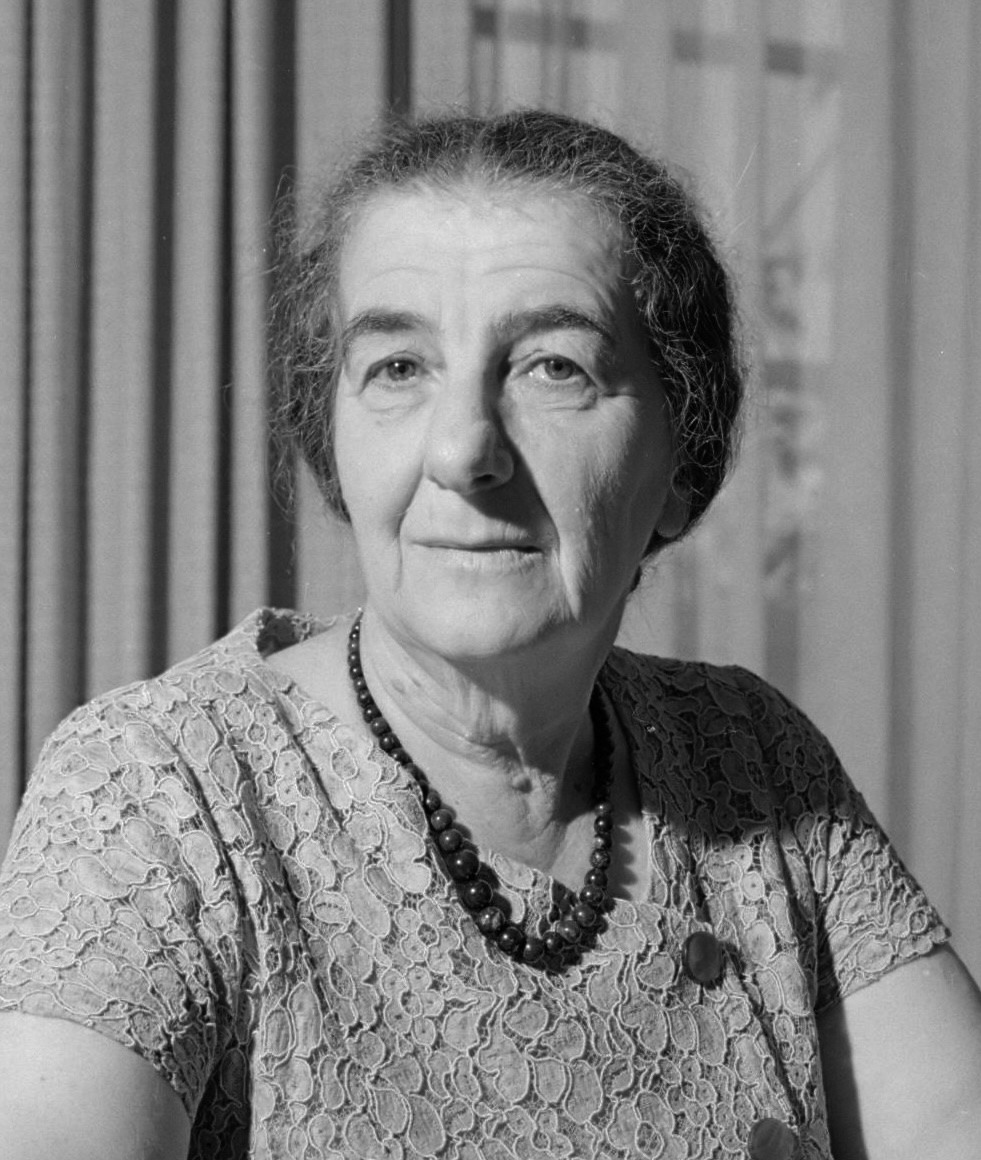
- Meir in 1964

Prime Minister of Israel
- In office 17 March 1969 – 3 June 1974
- President: Zalman Shazar; Ephraim Katzir
- Preceded by: Yigal Allon (interim)
- Succeeded by: Yitzhak Rabin
Other political positions
Leader of Labor Party
In office 17 March 1969 – 3 June 1974
| Preceded by | Levi Eshkol |
| Succeeded by | Yitzhak Rabin |
Minister of Interior
In office 16 July 1970 – 1 September 1970
| Prime Minister | Herself |
| Preceded by | Haim-Moshe Shapira |
| Succeeded by | Yosef Burg |
Minister of Foreign Affairs
In office 19 June 1956 – 12 January 1966
| Prime Minister | David Ben-Gurion; Levi Eshkol |
| Preceded by | Moshe Sharett |
| Succeeded by | Abba Eban |
Minister of Labor
In office 10 March 1949 – 19 June 1956
| Prime Minister | David Ben-Gurion; Moshe Sharett |
| Preceded by | Mordechai Bentov |
| Succeeded by | Mordechai Namir |
Member of the Knesset
In office 12 February 1949 – 3 June 1974
Minister Plenipotentiary to the Soviet Union
In office 10 September 1948 – 25 January 1949
| Preceded by | Office established |
| Succeeded by | Mordechai Namir |

Personal details
- Born: Golda Mabovitch; 3 May 1898 Kiev, Russian Empire (now in Ukraine)
- Died: 8 December 1978 (aged 80) West Jerusalem
- Party: Labor (1968–1978)
- Other political affiliations: Poale Zion (1915–1919); Ahdut HaAvoda (1919–1930); Mapai (1930–1968); Alignment (1969–1978)
- Spouse: Morris Meyerson (m. 1917; died 1951)
- Children: 2
- Education: Milwaukee State Normal School

Golda Meir (Note: English: /ˌɡoʊldə meɪˈɪər/ GOHL-də may-EER; Hebrew: גּוֹלְדָּה מֵאִיר, pronounced [ˈɡolda meˈ(ʔ)iʁ, ɡolˈda -]; Arabic: جولدا مائير, romanized: Gōldā Māʾīr.) (previously Meyerson; née Mabovitch; (Note: Ukrainian: Ґолда Мабович; Russian: Голда Мабович.) 3 May 1898 – 8 December 1978) was a Ukrainian-American-Israeli stateswoman, trade unionist, activist, and teacher who served as the prime minister of Israel from 1969 to 1974. She was Israel's first and, to date, only female head of government.

Born into a Ukrainian-Jewish family in Kiev, Russian Empire, Meir immigrated with her family to the United States in 1906. She graduated from the Milwaukee State Normal School and found work as a teacher. While in Milwaukee, she embraced the Labor Zionist movement. In 1921, Meir and her husband immigrated to Mandatory Palestine, settling in Merhavia, later becoming the kibbutz's representative to the Histadrut. In 1934, she was elevated to the executive committee of the trade union. Meir held several key roles in the Jewish Agency during and after World War II. She was a signatory of the Israeli Declaration of Independence, in 1948. Meir was elected to the Knesset, in 1949, and served as Labor Minister until 1956, when she was appointed Foreign Minister by Prime Minister David Ben-Gurion. She retired from the ministry in 1966 due to ill health.

In 1969, Meir assumed the role of prime minister following the death of Levi Eshkol. Early in her tenure, she made multiple diplomatic visits to western leaders to promote her vision of peace in the region. The outbreak of the Yom Kippur War in 1973 caught Israel off guard and inflicted severe early losses on the army. The resulting public anger damaged Meir's reputation and led to an inquiry into the failings. Her Alignment coalition was denied a majority in the subsequent legislative election; she resigned the following year and was succeeded as prime minister by Yitzhak Rabin. Meir died in 1978 of lymphoma and was buried on Mount Herzl.

A controversial figure in Israel, Meir has been lionized as a founder of the state and described as the "Iron Lady" of Israeli politics, but also widely blamed for the country being caught by surprise during the war of 1973. In addition, her dismissive statements towards the Palestinians have been described as the most famous example of Israeli denial of Palestinian identity. Most historians believe Meir was more successful as Minister of Labour and Housing than as Premier.

== Early life ==
Meir was born Golda Mabovitch on 3 May 1898 into a Ukrainian-Jewish family in downtown Kiev in the Russian Empire. Her parents were Blume Neiditch (1868–1951) and Moshe Yitzhak Mabovitch (1864–1944), a carpenter. Meir wrote in her autobiography that her earliest memories were of Moshe boarding up the front door in response to rumours of an imminent pogrom. She was named after Blume's paternal grandmother, Golde. Meir had two sisters, Sheyna (1889–1972) and Tzipora "Tzipke" (later known as Clara; born 1902–1981), as well as five other siblings who died in infancy.

Moshe left Russia to find work in New York City in 1903. In his absence, the rest of the family moved to Pinsk to join Blume's family. In 1905, Moshe moved to Milwaukee, Wisconsin, in search of higher-paying work and found employment in the workshops of the local railroad yard. The following year, he had saved up enough money to bring his family to the United States. Meir, along with Blume, Sheyna, and Tzipke, landed in Quebec and traveled to Milwaukee by train.

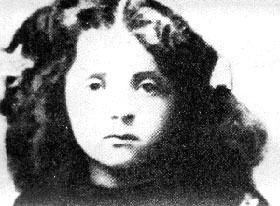
Golda Mabovitch, before 1910

Blume ran a grocery store on Milwaukee's north side. By the age of eight, Meir was often put in charge of watching the store when Blume went to buy supplies. Meir attended the Fourth Street Grade School, which is now known by the Golda Meir School, from 1906 to 1912. A leader early on, she and a close friend, Regina Hamburger, organized the American Young Sisters Society, a fundraiser to pay for her classmates' textbooks in 1908. As part of the organization's activities, Meir rented a hall and scheduled a public meeting for the event. She graduated as valedictorian of her class despite frequent tardiness due to having to work in Blume's store.

In 1912, Meir began studying at North Division High School and worked part-time. Her employers included Schuster's department store and the Milwaukee Public Library. Her parents had not wanted her to attend high school.

The following year, Meir took a train to live with her married sister, Sheyna Korngold, in Denver, Colorado. She attended North High School there. The Korngolds held intellectual evenings at their home, where she was exposed to debates on Zionism, literature, women's suffrage, trade unionism, and more. In her autobiography, Meir wrote: "To the extent that my own future convictions were shaped and given form ... those talk-filled nights in Denver played a considerable role." Around 1913, she began dating Morris Meyerson, a sign painter and socialist.

Return to Milwaukee, Zionist activism, and teaching

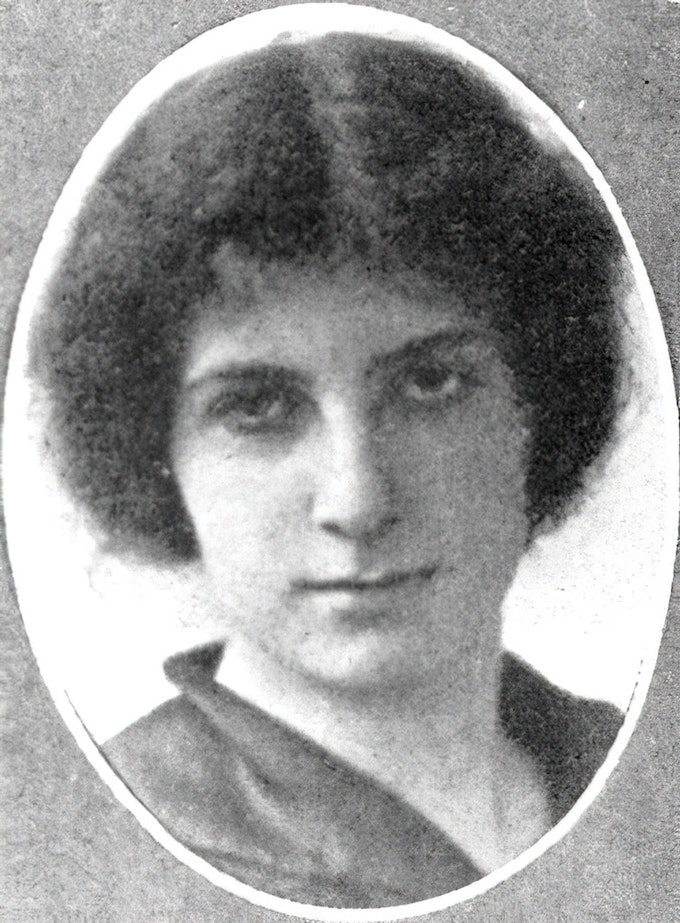
Golda Mabovitch in Milwaukee, Wisconsin, 1914

In 1914, after disagreements with her sister, Golda left North High School, moved out of her sister's home, and found work. After reconciling with her parents, she returned to Milwaukee and resumed studies at North Division High, graduating in 1915. While there, she became an active member of Young Poale Zion, which later became Habonim, the Labor Zionist youth movement. She spoke at public meetings and embraced Socialist Zionism.

She attended the teachers college Milwaukee State Normal School (now University of Wisconsin–Milwaukee) in 1916, and likely part of 1917. In 1917, she took a position at a Yiddish-speaking Folks Schule in Milwaukee. There, she further embraced Labor Zionism.

On 9 July 1917, Golda became a naturalized US citizen, as her father had naturalized, and at that time children of naturalized citizens under the age of 21 received citizenship by descent.

On 24 December 1917, Meir and Meyerson married. However, Meir's precondition for marriage was to settle in Palestine. She had intended to make aliyah (immigration to Israel) straight away, but her plans were disrupted when all transatlantic passenger services were canceled due to the entry of the United States into the First World War. She then threw her energies into Poale Zion activities. A short time after their wedding, she embarked on a fund-raising campaign for Poale Zion that took her across the United States.

Immigration to Mandatory Palestine

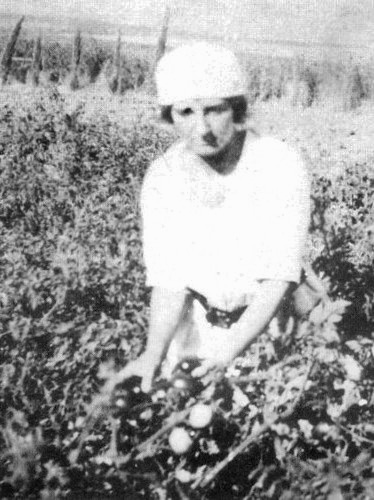
Golda Meir in the fields at Kibbutz Merhavia (1920s)

In 1921, after the conclusion of the war, the couple moved to Palestine, then part of the British Mandate, along with Meir's sister Sheyna, Sheyna's daughter, and Meir's childhood friend Regina. They sailed on the SS Pocahontas, from New York to Naples, then from there to Tel Aviv by train. Meir's parents subsequently moved to Palestine in 1926.

They were eventually accepted into kibbutz Merhavia in the Jezreel Valley after an initial rejected application. Her duties included picking almonds, planting trees, working in the chicken coops, and running the kitchen. Recognizing her leadership abilities, the kibbutz chose her as its representative to the Histadrut, the General Federation of Labour.

In 1924, the couple left the kibbutz and lived briefly in Tel Aviv before settling in Jerusalem. There, they had two children: a son Menachem in 1924, and a daughter Sarah in 1926. Meir returned to Merhavia for a brief period in 1925.

== Early political career ==
In 1928, Meir was elected secretary of Moetzet HaPoalot (Working Women's Council). She spent two years (1932–34) in the United States as an emissary for the organization and to get expert medical treatment for her daughter's kidney illness.

In 1934, when Meir returned from the United States, she joined the executive committee of the Histadrut and moved up the ranks to become the head of its Political Department. This appointment was important training for her future role in Israeli leadership.

In July 1938, Meir was the Jewish observer from Palestine at the Évian Conference, called by President Franklin D. Roosevelt of the United States to discuss the question of Jewish refugees' fleeing Nazi persecution. Delegates from the 32 invited countries repeatedly expressed their sorrow for the plight of the European Jews, but refused to admit the refugees. The only exception was the Dominican Republic, which pledged to accept 100,000 refugees on generous terms. Meir was disappointed at the outcome and she remarked to the press, "There is only one thing I hope to see before I die and that is that my people should not need expressions of sympathy anymore."

Throughout World War II, Meir served several key roles in the Jewish Agency, which functioned as the arm of the Zionist Organization in British Palestine.

In June 1946, Meir became acting head of the Political Department of the Jewish Agency after the British arrested Moshe Sharett and other leaders of the Yishuv as part of Operation Agatha. This was a critical moment in her career: she became the principal negotiator between the Jews in Palestine and the British Mandatory authorities. After his release, Sharett went to the United States to attend talks on the UN Partition Plan, leaving Meir to head the Political Department until the establishment of the state in 1948.

In 1947, she traveled to Cyprus to meet Jewish detainees of the Cyprus internment camps, who had been interned by the British after being caught trying to illegally enter Palestine, and persuade them to give priority to families with children to fill the small quota of detainees allowed into Palestine. She was largely successful in this task.

== Role in the Palestine War ==
On 17 November 1947, shortly before the outbreak of the 1947-1949 Palestine war, Meir met with King Abdullah I of Jordan. Abdullah I was seen as the only Arab leader willing to ally with a future Israeli state, as he also opposed the Mufti of Jerusalem and was rivals with other Arab countries. The meeting was cordial and confirmed that Abdullah was uninterested in invading and quietly willing to cooperate in the future.

=== First phase of the war ===
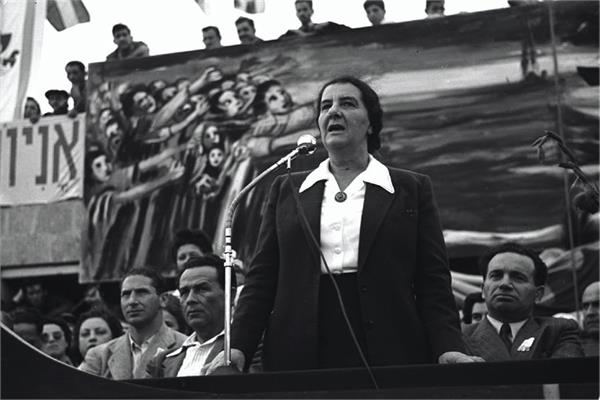
Golda Meir in Haifa, 1947

For most of the war, Meir reluctantly played what she felt was a minor role in Israel's activities. An article published by the Golda Meir institute said "she felt she was being pushed aside to a secondary arena".

However, she played a critical role in fundraising. In January 1948, the Jewish Agency needed to raise funds for the continuing war and the coming Israeli state. The treasurer of the Jewish Agency was convinced that they would not be able to raise more than $7 to $8 million from the American Jewish community. Meir raised over $30 million. Key to her success was an emotional speech she first delivered in Chicago on 22 January. She toured dozens of cities in the United States and returned to Israel on 18 March.

The funds were critical to the success of the war effort and the establishment of Israel; by comparison, the opposing Arab Higher Committee's annual budget was around $2.25 million, similar to Haganah's annual budget before the war. Ben-Gurion wrote that Meir's role as the "Jewish woman who got the money which made the state possible" would go down in history.

However, upon returning home, she suffered a political setback. The Jewish Agency and National Council Executives excluded her from the 13-member cabinet of the provisional government of Israel, and included her instead in the 37-member People's Council. Ben-Gurion protested this, saying "It is inconceivable that there shall be no adequate woman…it is a moral and political necessity, for the Yishuv, the Jewish world and the Arab world." At one point, he even considered offering her his spot on the cabinet.

On 13 April, she was hospitalized in Tel Aviv due to a suspected heart attack. Ben-Gurion and the political department heads urged her to guard her health and come to Jerusalem as soon as she could. They asked her to be "the mother of this city", and that her "words to 100,000 residents will be a source of blessing and encouragement". However, she felt it was a secondary and temporary role.

Instead, on 6 May, she visited Haifa after its 22 April occupation by Haganah. Meir called the mass expulsion and flight of Arabs before the 1948 Palestine war "dreadful", and likened it to what befell the Jews in Nazi-occupied Europe. She returned to Tel Aviv, and eventually to Jerusalem two weeks before the end of the mandate.

On the 11th of May, alongside Ezra Danin, Meir had a second meeting with Abdullah I. Abdullah had refused to meet her at Naharayim again, citing safety concerns, and told her that if she wanted to meet with him she would need to make her way to Amman. He had also refused to notify the Arab Legion of her arrival, forcing Meir to travel to Amman in secret disguised as an Arab woman.

The two met Abdullah in the home of an associate of Danin. According to Meir's account, when asked if Abdullah would break the promise he made to her at Naharayim, he responded by claiming that he had made the promise when he was alone, but now he was "one of five", and that he did not have the capability to fulfill the promise alone. Abdullah asked Meir to let him integrate Jordan into Palestine, with Jews being granted representation in the Jordanian parliament, but Meir refused.

By the end of the meeting, the two failed to reach an agreement and Abdullah told Meir that he would be forced to invade due to pressure from the Arab League. Meir expressed that she would be open to meeting him again after Israel had won the war.

=== Second phase of the war and appointment to Minister Plenipotentiary ===
On 14 May 1948, Meir became one of 24 signatories (including two women) of the Israeli Declaration of Independence. She later recalled, "After I signed, I cried. When I studied American history as a schoolgirl and I read about those who signed the U.S. Declaration of Independence, I couldn't imagine these were real people doing something real. And there I was sitting down and signing a declaration of establishment."

A day after independence, the second phase of the war began. Meir also suddenly lost her job and administrative responsibilities, as the Political Department became the provisional Ministry of Foreign Affairs, and her leadership role in Jerusalem was taken over by Dov Yosef.

On 18 May, she embarked on a second and even more successful fundraising tour in which she raised around $50 million. In total, her fundraising efforts raised around $90 million, around a third of the cost of the war ($275 million). During preparations for this trip, she was issued the first Israeli passport. Over the ten weeks that she was gone, Israel was battered by the war and changed drastically.

On 25 June, while still in the United States, Meir was appointed by Sharett, then the Minister of Foreign Affairs, as the minister plenipotentiary to the Soviet Union, which recently recognized Israel.

Meir was displeased by the offer. In spite of being born in Russia, she spoke no Russian and feared being lonely in Moscow. She said "At last we have a state. I want to be there. I don't want to go thousands of miles away. Why do I always have to go away?"

Her return to Israel was delayed due to a car crash in which she tore a ligament and fractured a bone. Soviet officials refused to believe she was in hospital and wanted an Israeli envoy as soon as possible. Thus she ignored doctor's orders to rest and returned to Israel on 29 July. Years later, her leg would frequently pain her.

== Cabinet positions ==
=== Minister Plenipotentiary to the Soviet Union (1948–1949) ===
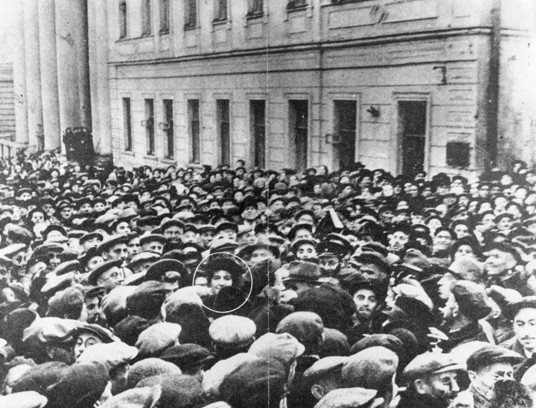
Meir surrounded by crowd of 50,000 Jews near Moscow Choral Synagogue on the first day of Rosh Hashanah in 1948. This image later appeared on the 1984 10,000-shekel banknote.

Meir served as minister plenipotentiary to the Soviet Union from 2 September 1948 to 10 March 1949.

She was reportedly impatient with diplomatic niceties and using interpreters. She did not drink or ballroom dance and had little interest in gossip and fashion. According to her interpreter, when asked by a Russian ambassador how she traveled to Moscow, she responded "tell His Excellency the Ambassador that we arrived riding on donkeys".

This was an important and difficult role. Good relations with the Soviet Union impacted Israel's ability to secure arms from Eastern European countries. In turn, Joseph Stalin and Soviet Foreign Minister Vyacheslav Molotov saw its relationship with Israel as a means of furthering the Soviet position in the Middle East. However, Soviet–Israeli relations were complicated by Soviet policies against religious institutions and nationalist movements, made manifest in actions to shut down Jewish religious institutions as well as the ban on Hebrew language study and the prohibition of promoting emigration to Israel.

Just 20 days after her term began, antisemitic crackdowns began in response to an article by Soviet Jewish writer Ilya Ehrenburg. Meir and the other Israeli representatives responded by making a point of visiting Russian Jewish businesses, synagogues, and performances.

On 3 October, during Rosh Hashanah celebrations at the Moscow Choral Synagogue, she was mobbed by thousands of Russian Jews chanting in Russian "Nasha Golda", meaning "Our Golda". In her autobiography she said "I felt as though I had been caught up in a torrent of love so strong that it had literally taken my breath away and slowed down my heart." This event was commemorated by the Israeli 10,000-shekel banknote issued in November 1984. It bore a portrait of Meir on one side and the image of the crowd greeting her in Moscow on the other.

To her close friends, she admitted she had little to do in Moscow and felt isolated from Israeli politics. Despite being a socialist that was born in Ukraine, her Jewish side caused friction with the Soviets that made progress difficult. By the end of her term, she felt she had accomplished little. She reportedly felt guilty for not achieving more for the Russian Jews, as she would have been in their situation if her father had not moved to the United States.

She planned to run for the first Knesset elections on 25 January 1949. The month before the elections, she returned to Israel and campaigned for Mapai. Mapai won 35% of the votes and formed a coalition, and Ben-Gurion invited her into the cabinet. She was sworn in on 8 March, and continued to serve in the Knesset until 1974.

=== Labor Minister (1949–1956) ===
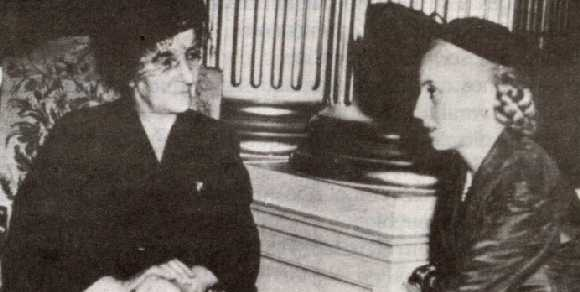
Golda Meir and Eva Perón in Argentina, 1951.

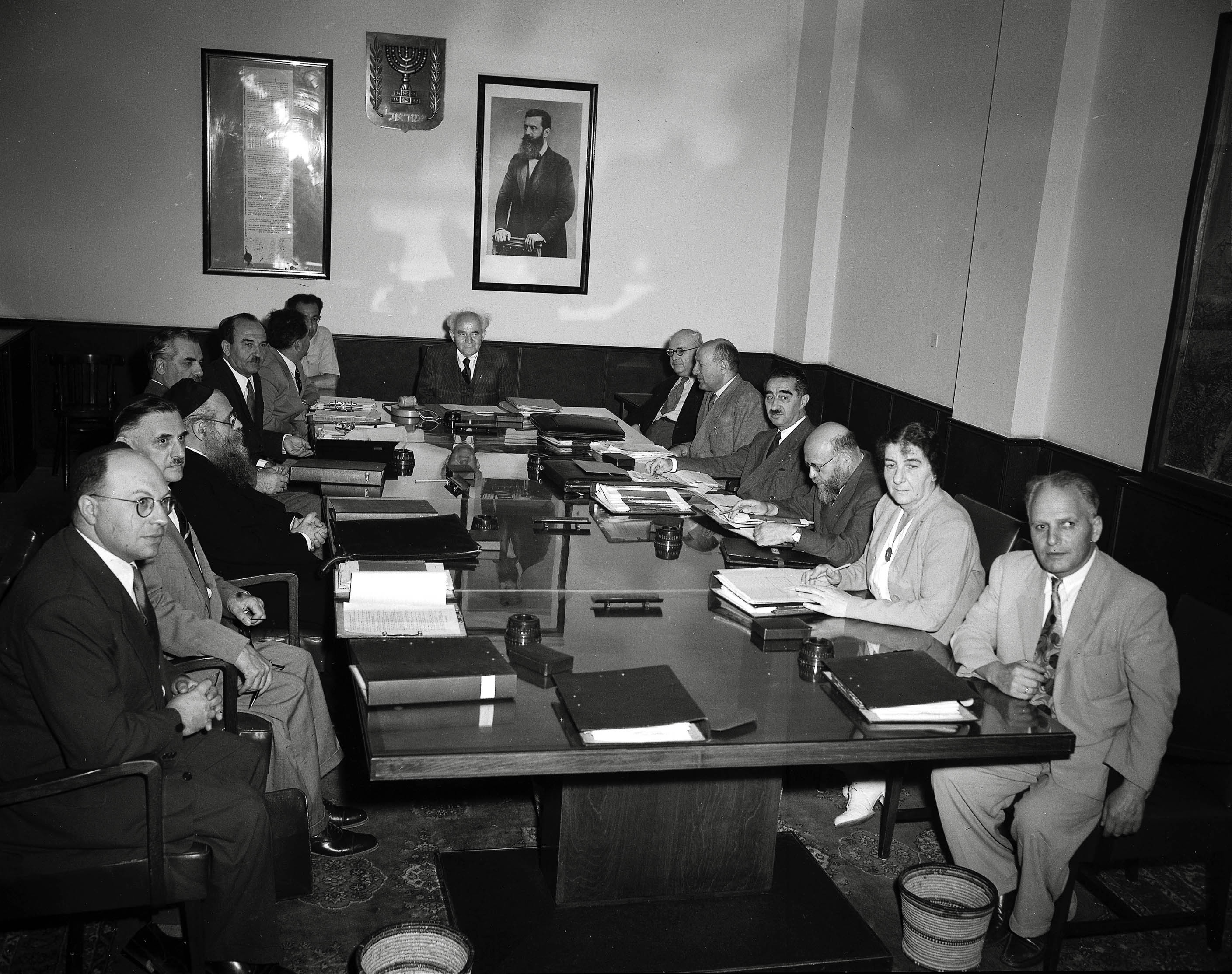
Golda Meir at first session of the third government (1951)

Ben-Gurion initially offered Meir the position of "deputy prime minister", which she rejected. She found the title and responsibilities vague, and disliked the idea of needing to coordinate with so many government departments.

Instead, she took the role of Labor Minister, which she held from 10 March 1949 to 19 June 1956. Meir enjoyed this role much more than her previous, calling it her "seven beautiful years". In particular, she enjoyed the ability to act quickly and with little friction from others. She was also one of the most powerful Israeli politicians at the time.

The main source of friction in the role was funding, especially to deal with the millions of immigrants arriving in the new state. In October 1950, Meir announced in Washington a three-year-plan for Israel's development and stated a price tag of $15 billion over the next 15 years. The Israeli government managed to secure a loan from the United States government and American Jews that secured 40% of the budget. The newly created Israel Bonds only provided a small amount, although years later they would contribute billions to the Israeli economy.

Meir assisted in building over a hundred ma'abarot (Hebrew: מַעְבָּרוֹת), temporary immigrant camps with crude tin-roofed huts and tents for housing. She drew criticism from many new immigrants and contemporary politicians due to this, but responded by pointing to her limited budget and the time needed to construct proper housing. In 1953, she assisted in an effort to eliminate the ma'abarot. By 1956, two-thirds were eliminated, and 120,000 families moved to permanent housing.

Meir considered herself highly productive during this period. She carried out welfare state policies, orchestrated the integration of immigrants into Israel's workforce, and introduced major housing and road construction projects. From 1949 to 1956, 200,000 apartments and 30,000 houses were built, large industrial and agricultural developments were initiated, and new hospitals, schools, and roads were built. Despite the complaints of her colleagues in the Finance Ministry, Meir worked to establish social security, maternity benefits, work-related accident insurance, benefits to widows and orphans, and even burial costs.

In 1954, she sided with Ben-Gurion against Pinhas Lavon in the Lavon Affair.

In the summer of 1955, Meir reluctantly ran for the position of mayor of Tel Aviv on request of her party. At the time, mayors were elected by the city council and not directly. She lost by the two votes of the religious bloc who withheld their support on the grounds that she was a woman. While angered by the sexism she encountered, she was happy to rejoin her colleagues in the cabinet.

On 3 August 1955, she was again hospitalized after complaining of chest pains, and was diagnosed with arrhythmia.

=== Foreign minister (1956–1966) ===
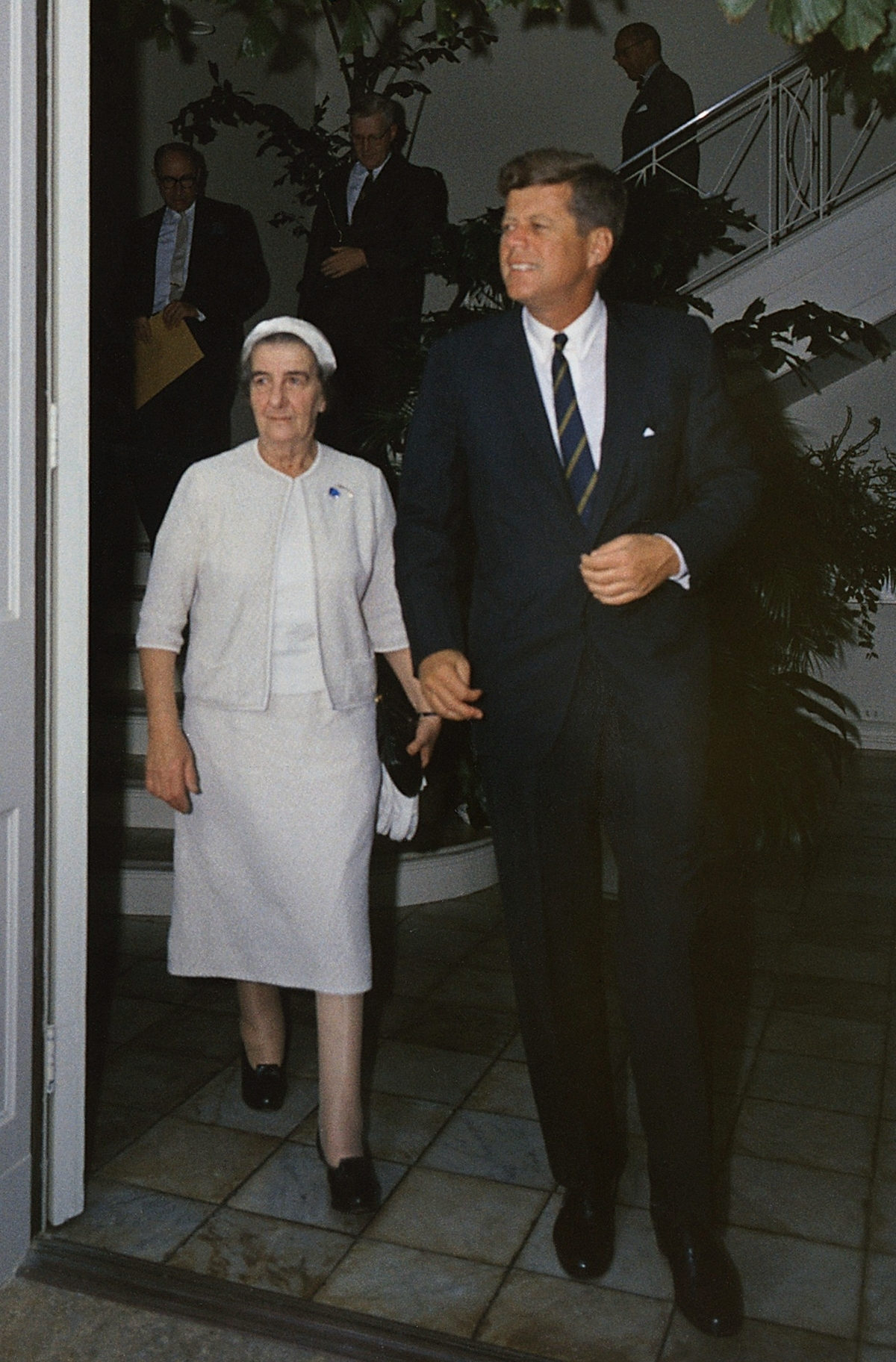
Meir with U.S. President John F. Kennedy, 27 December 1962.

In October 1955, Ben-Gurion appointed Meir as foreign minister, replacing Sharett. The occasional disagreements between Ben-Gurion and Sharett had escalated to snubbing in meetings and refusals to speak face-to-face. Meir, while less experienced in foreign affairs than Sharett, had a consistently loyal and friendly relationship with Ben-Gurion. While Meir eventually came to enjoy her new job, she disliked the lingering pro-Sharett colleagues in her department.

Meir served as foreign minister from 18 June 1956 to 12 January 1966. Her first months as Foreign Minister coincided with the 1956 Suez Crisis, in which Israel, Britain, and France invaded Egypt to regain Western control over the Suez Canal, remove the President of Egypt Gamal Abdel Nasser, and secure freedom of navigation through the Straits of Tiran for Israel. Meir planned and coordinated with the French government and military prior to the start of the invasion. During United Nations debates about the crisis, Meir took charge of the Israeli delegation. After the fighting started, the United States, the Soviet Union, and the United Nations forced the three invaders to withdraw.

As foreign minister, Meir promoted ties with the newly established states in Africa in an effort to gain allies in the international community. She also believed that Israel had experience in nation-building that could be a model for the Africans. In her autobiography, she wrote:

Like them, we had shaken off foreign rule; like them, we had to learn for ourselves how to reclaim the land, how to increase the yields of our crops, how to irrigate, how to raise poultry, how to live together, and how to defend ourselves. Israel could be a role model because it had been forced to find solutions to the kinds of problems that large, wealthy, powerful states had never encountered.

She also devoted much effort to convincing the United States to sell Israel weaponry. One success in this area came in 1962, when the White House quietly agreed to sell Hawk missiles to Israel. Israel's relationship with the Soviet Union remained frosty during her tenure.

On 29 October 1957, Meir's foot was slightly injured when a Mills bomb was thrown into the debating chamber of the Knesset. David Ben-Gurion and Moshe Carmel were more seriously injured. The attack was carried out by 25-year-old Moshe Dwek. Born in Aleppo, his motives were attributed to a dispute with the Jewish Agency, but he was described as being "mentally unbalanced".

In 1958, shortly after the death of Pope Pius XII, Meir praised the late pope for assisting the Jewish people. The pontiff's legacy as a wartime pope has continued to be controversial into the 21st century.

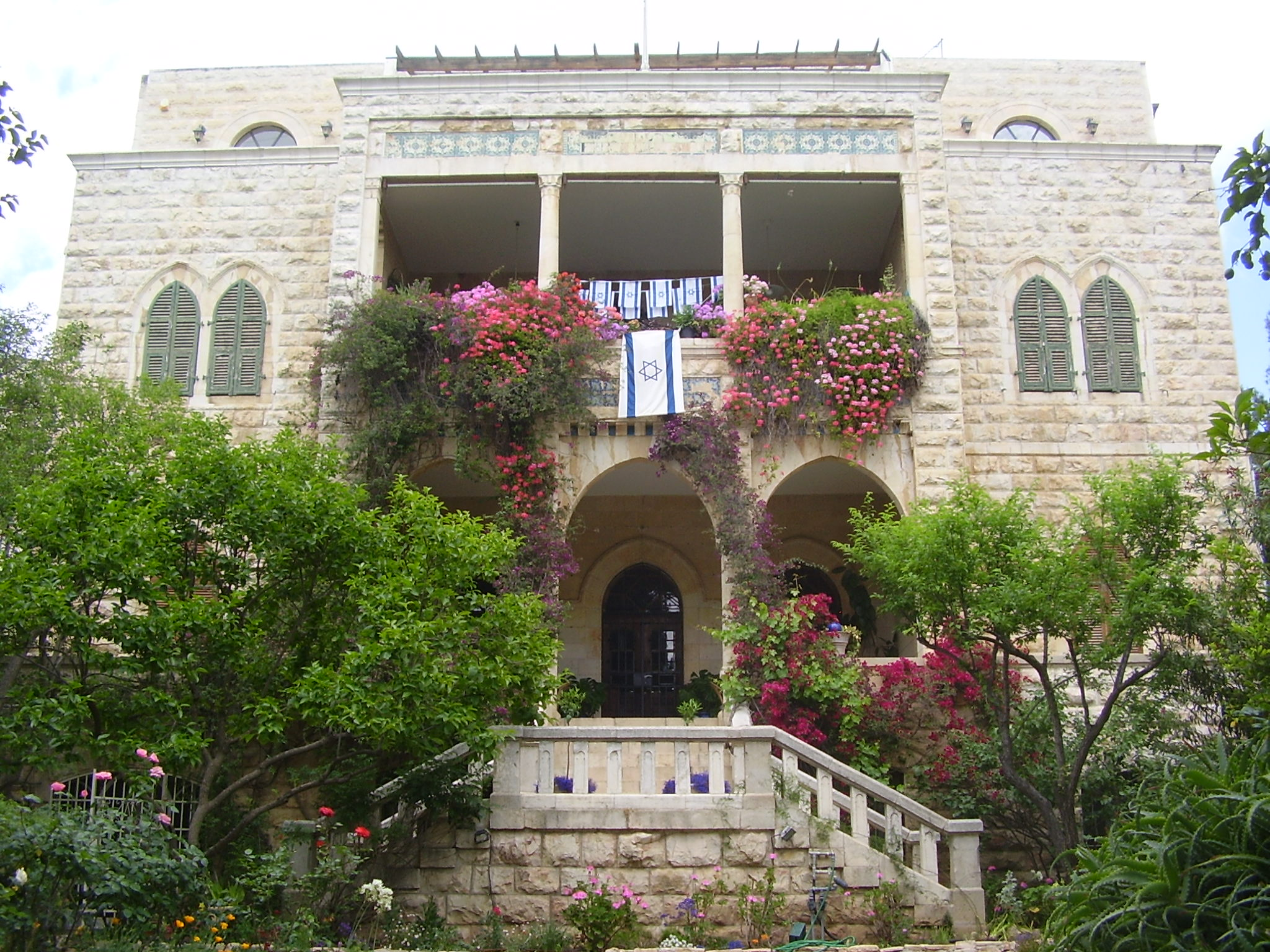
Villa Harun Al Rashid, in Talbiya, built in 1926 by a Palestinian, Hanna Bisharat, confiscated by the Israelis after 1948, and becoming Meir's residence during the 1960s

The same year, during the wave of Jewish migration from Poland to Israel, Meir sought to prevent disabled and sick Polish Jews from immigrating to Israel. In a letter sent to Israel's ambassador in Warsaw, Katriel Katz, she wrote:

A proposal was raised in the coordination committee to inform the Polish government that we want to institute selection in aliyah, because we cannot continue accepting sick and handicapped people. Please give your opinion as to whether this can be explained to the Poles without hurting immigration."

In late 1965, 67-year-old Meir was diagnosed with lymphoma. In January 1966, she retired from her role as Foreign Minister, citing exhaustion and ill health, although she continued to serve in the Knesset and as secretary-general of Mapai.

During the 1960s, Meir lived in a flat on the upper level of a house that was once known as Villa Harun al-Rashid. The house was built in 1926 by Hanna Bisharat and later rented to British officers. The house was later given to Zionist militias, due to the prominent view from the roof. According to Hanna Bisharat's grandson George Bisharat, Meir had the tiles on the house's front sandblasted "to obliterate the 'Villa Harun ar-Rashid' and thereby conceal the fact that she was living in an Arab home."

== Premiership (1969–1974) ==
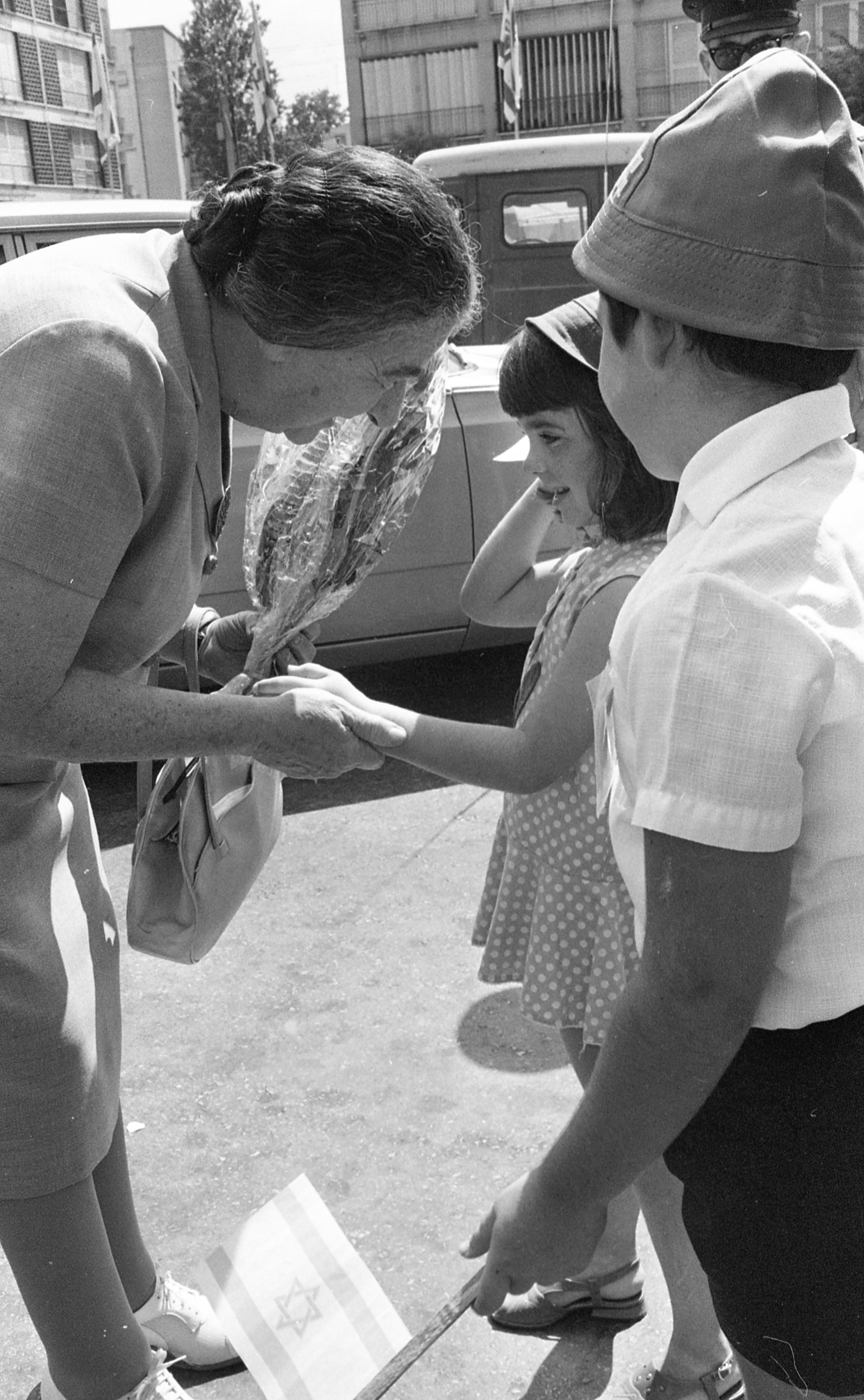
PM Golda Meir in Tel Aviv, July, 1969

Prime Minister Levi Eshkol died suddenly on 26 February 1969, leading to the appointment of Yigal Allon as interim prime minister and an election to replace him. Before the vote, most suspected that Meir would be elected. On 7 March 1969, the party's central committee voted Meir as the new party leader. Now age 71, Meir had mixed feelings due to her health concerns, but eventually agreed, saying that she would honor the party's decision just as she had honored all of the party's past decisions.

Meir served as prime minister from 17 March 1969 to 3 June 1974. She maintained the national unity government formed in 1967 after the Six-Day War, in which Mapai merged with two other parties (Rafi and Ahdut HaAvoda) to form the Israeli Labor Party.

Six months after taking office, Meir led the reconfigured Alignment, comprising Labor and Mapam, into the 1969 general election. The Alignment managed what is still the best showing for a single party or faction in Israeli history, winning 56 seats. This is the only time that a party or faction has approached winning an outright majority in an election. The national unity government was retained.

In 1969 and the early 1970s, Meir met with many world leaders to promote her peace settlement idea, including Richard Nixon (1969), Nicolae Ceaușescu (1972) and Pope Paul VI (1973). In 1973, she hosted the chancellor of West Germany, Willy Brandt, in Israel.

In August 1970, Meir accepted a U.S. peace initiative that called for an end to the War of Attrition and an Israeli pledge to withdraw to "secure and recognized boundaries" in the framework of a comprehensive peace settlement. The Gahal party quit the national unity government in protest, but Meir continued to lead the remaining coalition.

On February 28, 1973, during a visit in Washington, D.C., Meir agreed with Henry Kissinger's peace proposal based on "security versus sovereignty": Israel would accept Egyptian sovereignty over all Sinai, while Egypt would accept Israeli presence in some of Sinai's strategic positions.

=== "There was no such thing as Palestinians" ===
In June 1969, on the second anniversary of the Six-Day War, Meir stated in an interview that "there was no such thing as Palestinians", a comment later described by Al Jazeera as "one of her defining – and most damning – legacies." This phrase is considered to be the most famous example of Israeli denial of Palestinian identity.

The interview entitled Who can blame Israel was published in The Sunday Times on June 15, 1969, and included the following exchange:

- Frank Giles: Do you think the emergence of the Palestinian fighting forces, the Fedayeen, is an important new factor in the Middle East?
- Golda Meir: Important, no. A new factor, yes. There was no such thing as Palestinians. When was there an independent Palestinian people with a Palestinian state? It was either southern Syria before the First World War and then it was a Palestine including Jordan. It was not as though there was a Palestinian people in Palestine considering itself as a Palestinian people and we came and threw them out and took their country from them. They did not exist.

=== Munich Olympics (1972) ===
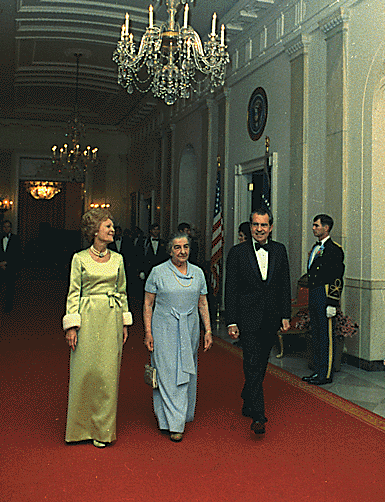
Meir (center) with Pat and President Richard Nixon in Washington, DC, in 1973.

In the wake of the Munich massacre at the 1972 Summer Olympics, Meir appealed to the world to "save our citizens and condemn the unspeakable criminal acts committed". Outraged at the perceived lack of global action, she ordered the Mossad to hunt down and assassinate suspected leaders and operatives of Black September and the PFLP.

=== Dispute with Austria (1973) ===
During the 1970s, about 200,000 Soviet Jewish emigrants were allowed to leave the Soviet Union for Israel by way of Austria. When seven of these emigrants were taken hostage at the Austria–Czechoslovakia border by Palestinian militants in September 1973, the Chancellor of Austria, Bruno Kreisky, closed the Jewish Agency's transit facility in Schönau, Austria. A few days later in Vienna, Meir tried to convince Kreisky to reopen the facility by appealing to his own Jewish origin, and described his position as "succumbing to terrorist blackmail". Kreisky did not change his position, so Meir returned to Israel, infuriated. A few months later, Austria opened a new transition camp.

=== Yom Kippur War (1973) ===
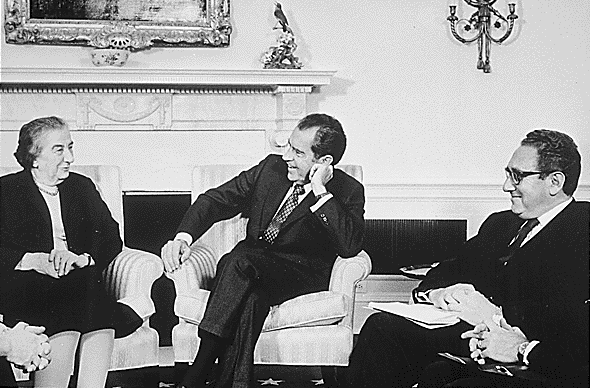
US President Richard Nixon and Israeli Prime Minister Golda Meir meeting on March 1, 1973, in the Oval Office. Nixon's National Security Advisor Henry Kissinger is to the right of Nixon.

A common criticism of Meir is that she could have avoided the Yom Kippur War in 1973. For months preceding the attack, Egyptian President Anwar Sadat made repeated overtures for peace in exchange for a full Israeli withdrawal from the Sinai, but these gestures were rebuffed by Meir, who had offered previously to discuss ceding "most of the Sinai", but was not willing to restore the pre-1967 borders, and Egypt had no interest in peace talks under Meir's conditions. As the nation's leader during this short war, her main goal was deciding on the timing of preliminary operations, and providing the IDF with the necessary time and munitions to pull off a victory.

In the days leading up to the Yom Kippur War, Israeli intelligence could not conclusively determine that an attack was imminent. However, on 5 October 1973, Meir received information that Syrian forces were massing on the Golan Heights. She was alarmed by the reports, and believed that the situation was similar to what preceded the Six-Day War. However, her advisers counseled her not to worry, saying they would have adequate notice before any war broke out. This made sense at the time; after the Six Day War, most in the Israeli intelligence community considered the Arabs unprepared to launch another attack. Consequently, although the Knesset passed a resolution granting her power to demand a full-scale call-up of the military (instead of the typical cabinet decision), Meir did not mobilize Israel's forces early. Soon, though, the threat of war became very clear. Six hours before the outbreak of hostilities, Meir met with Minister of Defense Moshe Dayan and General David Elazar. While Dayan continued to argue that war was unlikely and favored calling up the air force and only two divisions, Elazar advocated full-scale army mobilization and the launch of a full-scale preemptive strike on Syrian forces.

On October 6, Meir approved full-scale mobilizing but rejected a preemptive strike, citing concerns that Israel might be perceived as initiating hostilities, which would hurt Israel's access to crucial foreign aid and military support, in particular from the United States, in the resulting conflict. She made it a priority to inform Washington of her decision. U.S. Secretary of State Henry Kissinger later confirmed Meir's assessment by stating that if Israel had launched a preemptive strike, Israel would not have received the backing of the United States.

=== Resignation (1974) ===
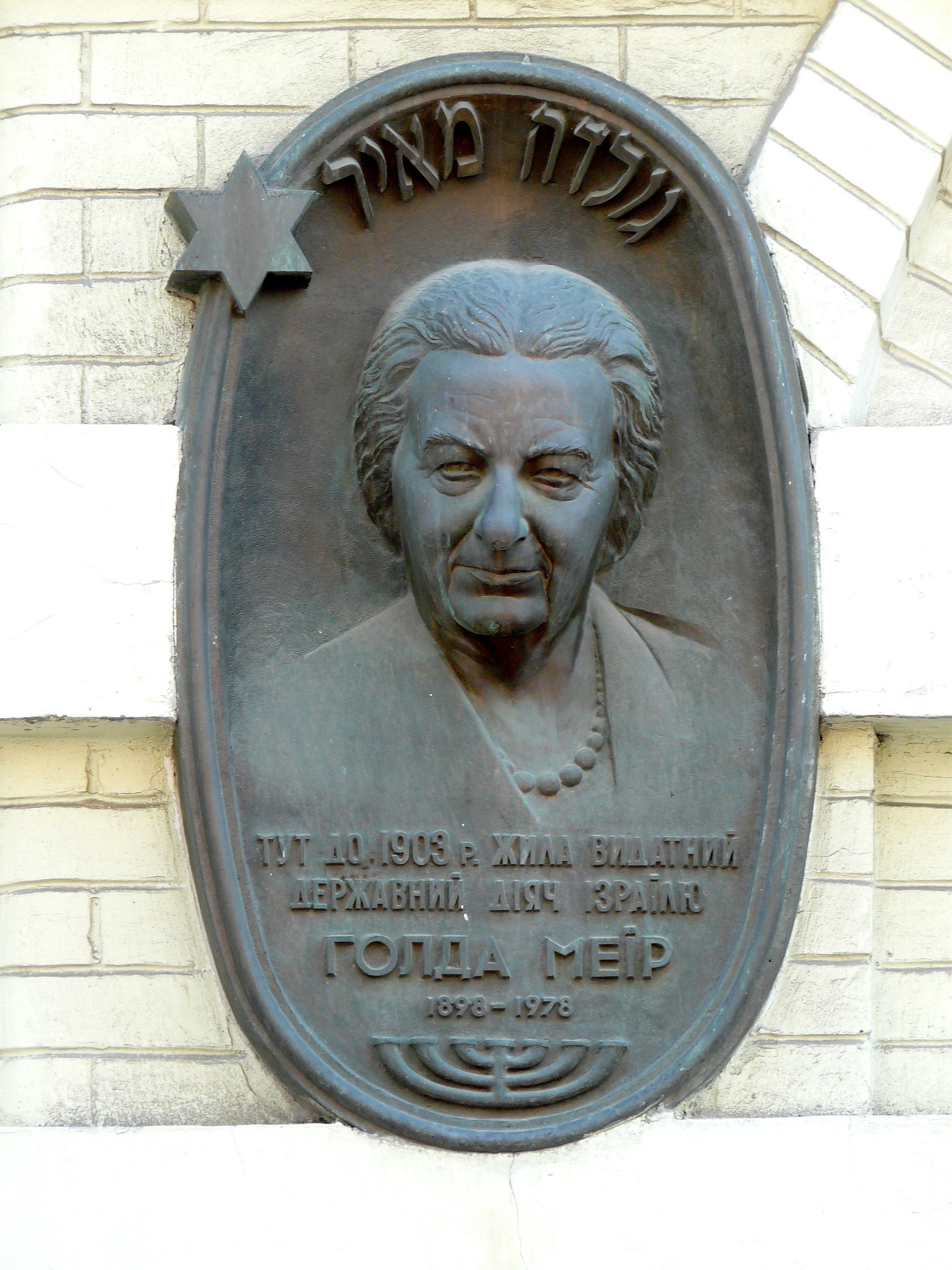
Golda Meir Memorial Plaque on the building where she was born (5-A Baseina Street, Kyiv)

Following the Yom Kippur War, Meir's government was plagued by infighting and questions over Israel's lack of preparation for the war. The Agranat Commission appointed to investigate the war cleared Meir of "direct responsibility". It said about her actions on Yom Kippur morning:

She decided wisely, with common sense and speedily, in favour of the full mobilization of the reserves, as recommended by the chief-of-staff, despite weighty political considerations, thereby performing a most important service for the defence of the state.

Her party won the elections in December 1973, but the coalition lost seats and was unable to form a majority. Meir resigned as prime minister on 11 April 1974, and gave up her Knesset seat on 7 June 1974. She never held office again. She believed that was the "will of the people" and that she had served enough time as premier. She believed the government needed to form a coalition. She said, "Five years are sufficient ... It is beyond my strength to continue carrying this burden." Yitzhak Rabin succeeded her on June 3, 1974.

== Later years ==
In 1975, Meir published her autobiography, My Life, which became a New York Times Best Seller.

On 21 November 1977, Meir spoke at the Knesset on behalf of the Labor Party to Egyptian President Anwar Sadat during his historic trip as the first Arab leader to visit Israeli-controlled territory. She said his visit was important for the sake of the next generations' avoiding war, praised Sadat for his courage and vision, and expressed the hope that while many differences remained to be resolved, that vision would be achieved in a spirit of mutual understanding. In May 1978 Meir was interviewed live by video link by Barbra Streisand at the finale of the American television special The Stars Salute Israel at 30, broadcast to celebrate the 30th anniversary of the state of Israel.

On 8 December 1978, Meir died of lymphatic cancer (lymphoma) in Jerusalem at the age of 80. She was buried on Mount Herzl in Jerusalem.

== Personal life ==
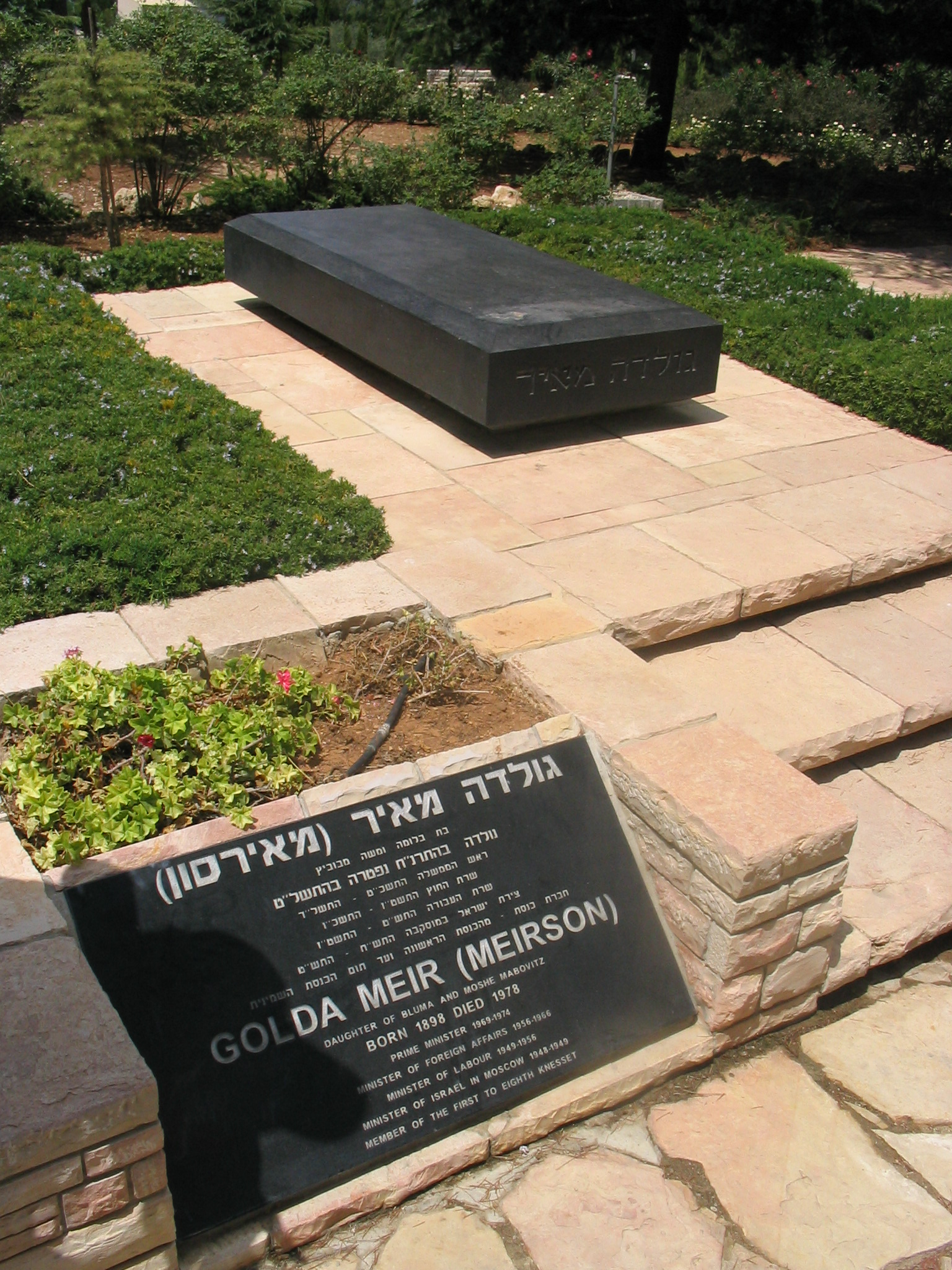
Golda Meir's grave on Mount Herzl

Meir's husband Morris Meyerson (also "Myerson") was born on 17 December 1893 in Chicago, Illinois. They married on December 24, 1917, and remained married until his death in Jerusalem on 25 May 1951. She never remarried. Despite never divorcing, the couple grew apart over the course of the marriage. When Meir took her children with her to the United States in the 1930s, Morris stayed behind in Jerusalem.

Meir had two children. Her son, Menachem, was born in Jerusalem in 1924 and died on 14 December 2014 in Tel Aviv. He was a professional cellist who studied at the Israel Conservatory and Manhattan School of Music. Her daughter Sarah was born on 17 May 1926 and died on 30 January 2010 in Revivim.

She had two sisters, Sheyna (1889–1972) and Tzipke (1902–1981), as well as five other siblings who died in childhood.

Morris, Sheyna Korngold and her husband Shamai were buried on Nahalat Yitzhak Cemetery in Givatayim.

In 1956, after becoming Foreign Minister, she changed her surname from "Meyerson" to "Meir", meaning "illuminate", as her predecessor Moshe Sharett had all members of the foreign service take a Hebrew surname.

She was a heavy smoker and coffee drinker, and did not exercise often, which may have contributed to her recurring heart problems.

Of her Jewish identity, Meir said in the 1975 edition of her autobiography My Life that:

It is not only a matter, I believe, of religious observance and practice. To me, being Jewish means and has always meant being proud to be part of a people that has maintained its distinct identity for more than 2,000 years, with all the pain and torment that has been inflicted upon it.

She strongly identified with Judaism culturally, but was an atheist in religious belief. She is famously reported to have stated: "I believe in the Jewish people, and the Jewish people believe in God." In her later years she widened her religious attitude, especially concerning the State of Israel: "This country exists as the fulfillment of a promise made by God himself. It would be ridiculous to ask it to account for its legitimacy."

== Awards and recognition ==
In 1974 Meir was awarded the James Madison Award for Distinguished Public Service by Princeton University's American Whig–Cliosophic Society.

Also in 1974, Meir was awarded the honor of World Mother by American Mothers.

In 1975, Meir was awarded the Israel Prize for her special contribution to society and the State of Israel.

In 1985, Meir was inducted into the Colorado Women's Hall of Fame.

In 2019, Time created 89 new covers to celebrate women of the year starting from 1920; it chose her for 1956.

== Legacy ==
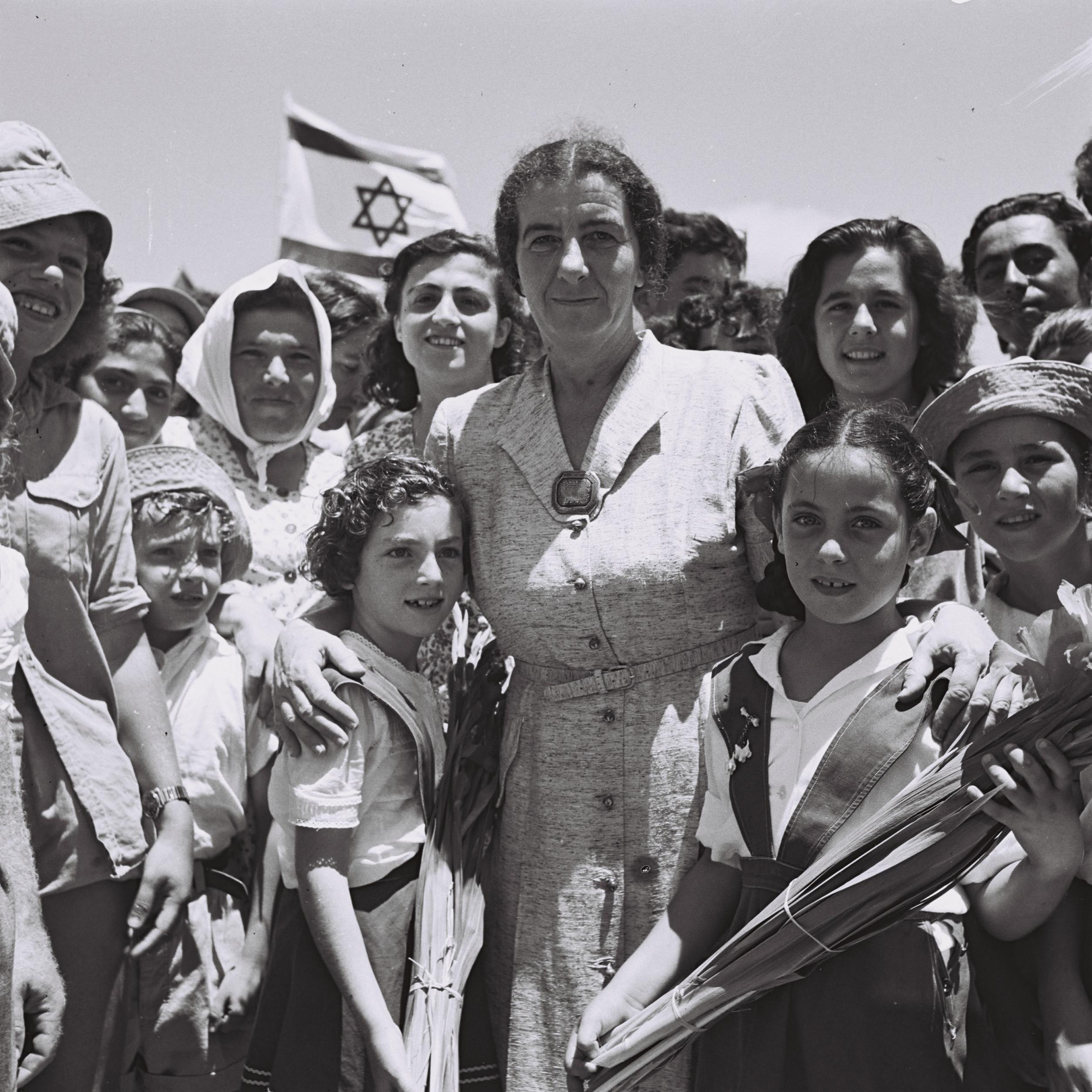
Meir with children of Kibbutz Shfayim, 1950

Biographer Meron Medzini argues that a perspective of forty years makes possible an appreciation of her deep nationalism and Zionism. Historians find her main legacy includes effective leadership of the Labor Movement, and building good relationships with Third World nations. Medzini states, "Apart from laying the foundations for Israel’s presence in Africa, she was never taken with the routine and often dull diplomatic work in the Foreign Ministry and abhorred its outer manifestations of ceremonies and rites." Most historians agree she was a success as Secretary of Labor and Housing, but a failure as prime minister.

A controversial figure in Israel, she has been lionized as a founder of the state and described as the "Iron Lady" of Israeli politics, but also widely blamed for the country being caught by surprise during the 1973 Yom Kippur War. She was also criticized for her dismissive statements towards the Palestinians.

=== Portrayals in film and theater ===
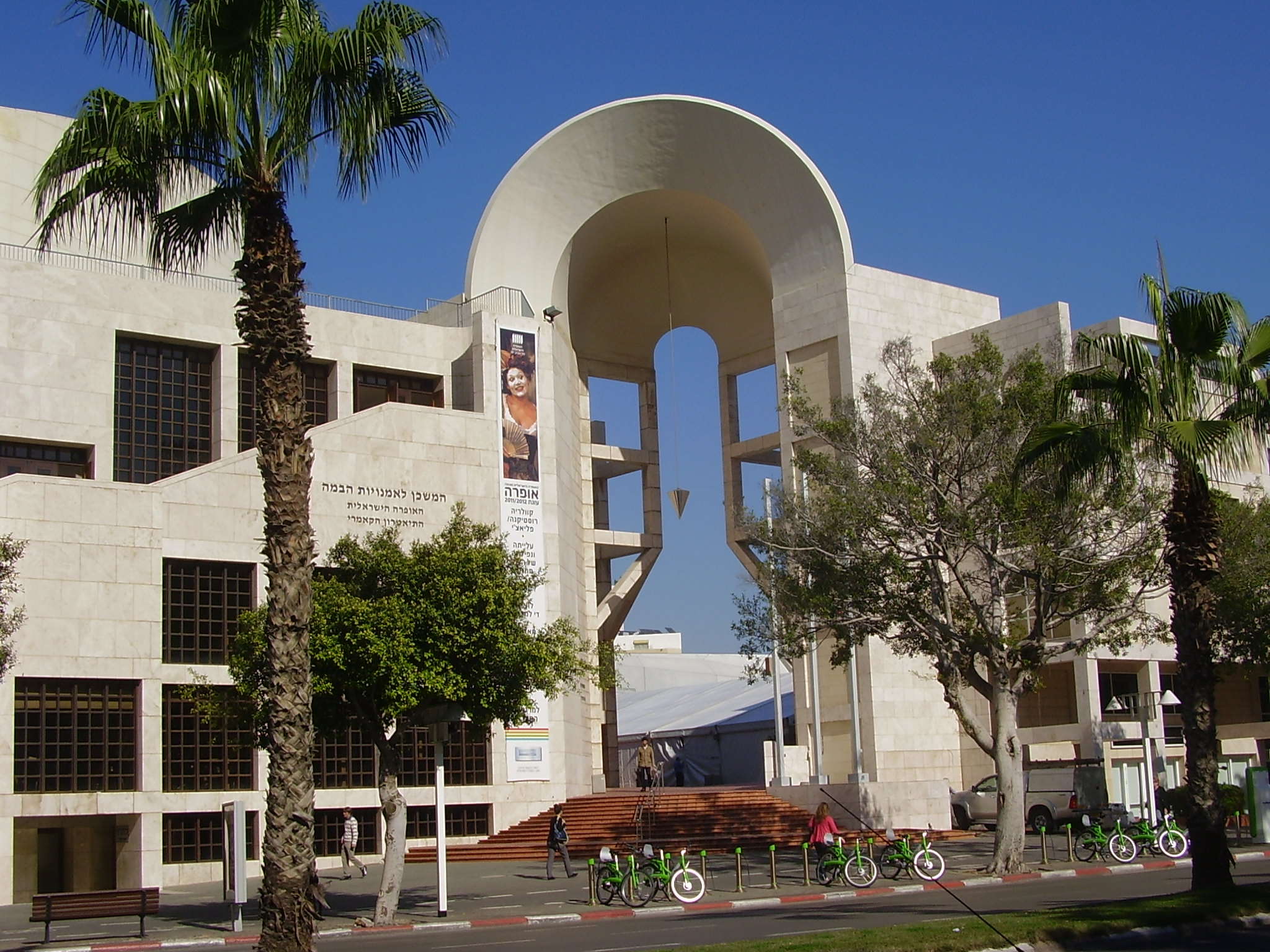
Facade of the Golda Meir Center for the Performing Arts – home to the Israeli Opera and the Cameri Theater, Tel Aviv

Meir's story has been the subject of many fictionalized portrayals. In 1977, Anne Bancroft played Meir in William Gibson's Broadway play Golda. The Australian actress Judy Davis played a young Meir in the television film A Woman Called Golda (1982), opposite Leonard Nimoy. Ingrid Bergman played the older Meir in the same film. Actress Colleen Dewhurst portrayed Meir in the 1986 TV movie Sword of Gideon.

In 2003, American Jewish actress Tovah Feldshuh portrayed her on Broadway in Golda's Balcony, Gibson's second play about Meir's life. The play was controversial for implying that Meir considered using nuclear weapons during the Yom Kippur War. Valerie Harper portrayed Meir in the touring company production and in the film version of Golda's Balcony. In 2005, actress Lynn Cohen portrayed Meir in Steven Spielberg's film Munich.

Tovah Feldshuh assumed the role of Meir again in the 2006 English-language French movie O Jerusalem. She was played by the Polish actress Beata Fudalej in the 2009 dramatic film The Hope directed by Márta Mészáros.

English actor Helen Mirren portrayed Meir in the 2023 biopic film Golda, directed by Guy Nattiv and produced by Michael Kuhn. The film centres on the Yom Kippur War.

As of April 2021, a TV miniseries Lioness starring Shira Haas is also currently being produced and will be directed by Barbra Streisand.As of August 2026, IMBd listed it as in development.

=== Commemoration ===
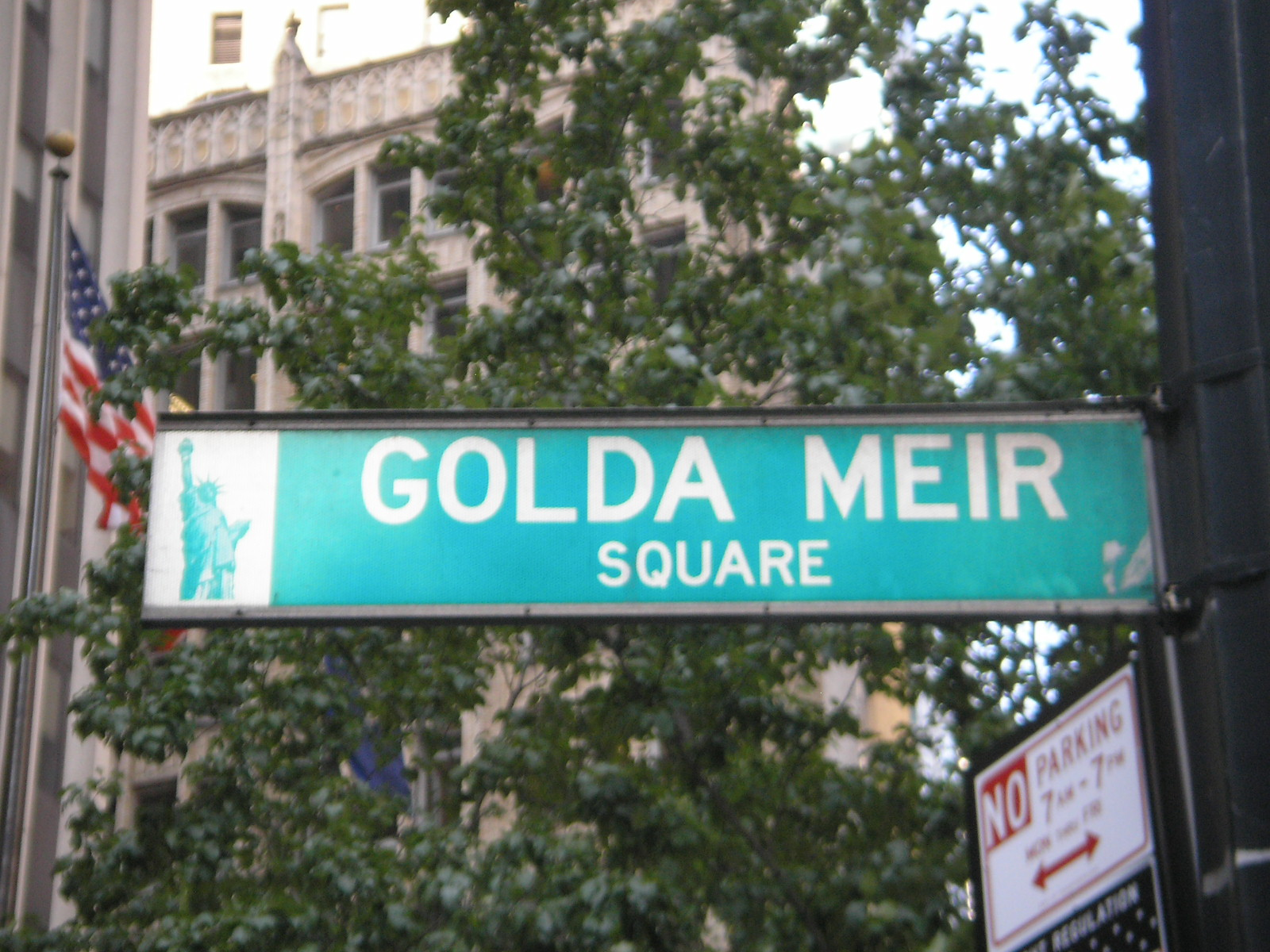
Golda Meir Square in Manhattan

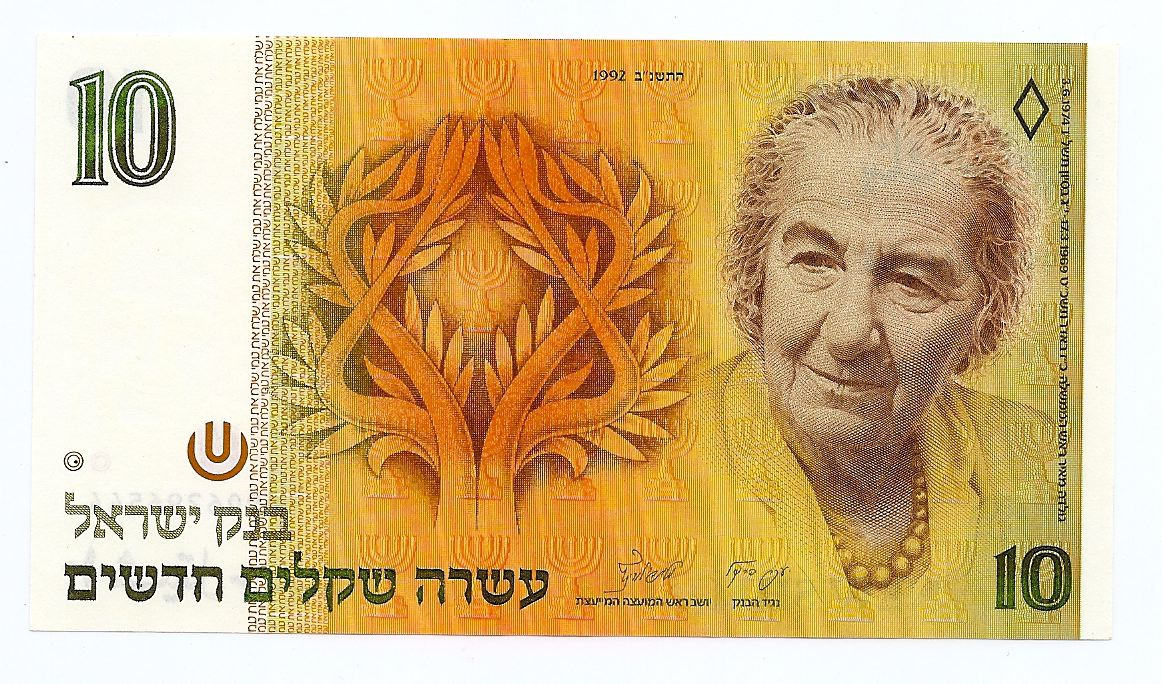
Israeli 10 New Sheqalim Banknote commemorating Golda Meir

- Golda Meir House Museum and Education Center, Auraria Campus, 1149 9t Street, Denver CO 80204
- Golda Meir School, Milwaukee, Wisconsin
- Golda Meir School, in Barra da Tijuca, Rio de Janeiro, Brazil
- Golda Meir Library, University of Wisconsin–Milwaukee, Wisconsin
- Golda Meir Boulevard, Jerusalem, Israel (and various other streets, neighborhoods and schools in Israel)
- Golda Meir Center for the Performing Arts – home to the Israeli Opera and the Cameri Theater, Tel Aviv
- Bust of Golda Meir at Golda Meir Square, New York City
- Golda Meir Center for Political Leadership at Metropolitan State University of Denver
- Golda Meir House, Denver, Colorado
- Golda Meir House, Newton, Massachusetts
- Golda Meir Street in the city of Kyiv

=== Cultural references ===
In Israel, the term "Golda's shoes" (na'alei Golda) has become a reference to the sturdy orthopedic shoes that Golda favored. These shoes were also supplied to women soldiers in the Israel Defense Forces from its foundation to 1987.

== Published works ==
- This Is Our Strength (1962) – Golda Meir's collected papers
- My Father's House (1972)
- My Life (1975). Putnam, ISBN 0-399-11669-9.

== See also ==
- Évian Conference
- List of Israel Prize recipients
- List of prime ministers of Israel
- List of elected and appointed female heads of state and government

== Sources ==
- Avner, Yehuda (2010). The Prime Ministers: An Intimate Narrative of Israeli Leadership. Toby Press. ISBN 978-1-59264-278-6. OCLC 758724969.
- Burkett, Elinor (2008). Golda Meir: The Iron Lady of the Middle East. Gibson Square. ISBN 978-1-906142-13-1.
- Medzini, Meron. "Golda Meir–A Forty Year Perspective." Israel Studies 23.1 (2018): 73–85. online

Political offices
| Preceded by Moshe Sharett | Minister of Foreign Affairs; 1956–1966 | Succeeded by Abba Eban |
| Preceded by Levi Eshkol | Prime Minister of Israel; 1969–1974 | Succeeded by Yitzhak Rabin |
| Preceded by Haim-Moshe Shapira | Minister of Internal Affairs; 1970 | Succeeded by Yosef Burg |
Party political offices
| Preceded by Levi Eshkol | Leader of the Alignment; 1969–1974 | Succeeded by Yitzhak Rabin |
