= Cinema Management Group =

American film company

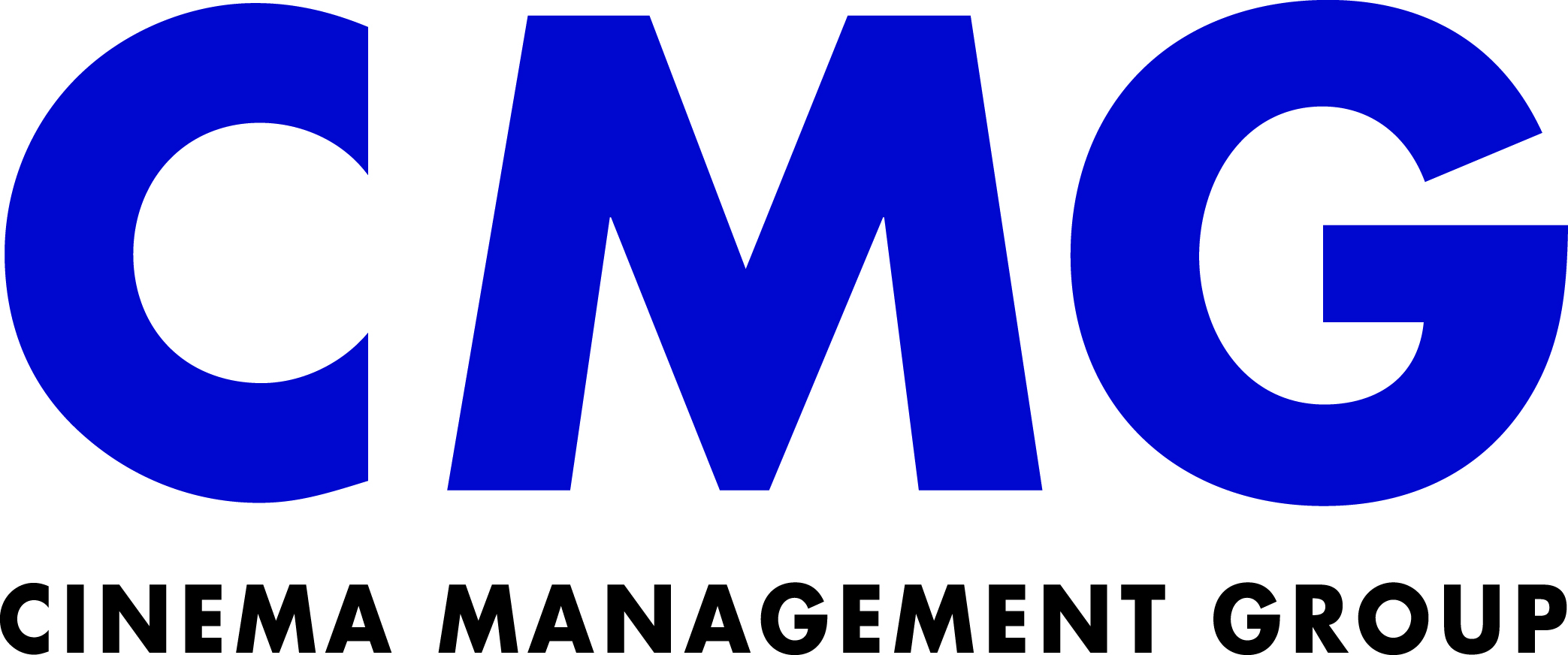
- Industry: Film
- Founded: 2003; 23 years ago
- Founder: Edward Noeltner
- Defunct: January 6, 2025; 19 months ago
- Fate: Chapter 7 bankruptcy
- Headquarters: Beverly Hills, California, United States
- Products: Motion pictures
- Website: Official website

Cinema Management Group was an American company based in Beverly Hills, California that acquires licenses and distributes feature, animated, and documentary films. The company is noted for its catalog of internationally produced animated features that is sold to the world markets.

== History ==
The company was founded in 2003 by Edward Noeltner. In 2004 the company acquired the rights for the CGI animated film Hoodwinked!: The True Story of Red Riding Hood. CMG expanded its genre distribution with the indie film Reeker and the sequel No Man's Land: The Rise of Reeker. CMG represented Moriah Films. Since 2004, CMG-licensed animated features have grossed over $400 million at the worldwide box office.

CMG distributed the animated films Adventures in Zambezia, Hoodwinked!, Khumba, The Legend of Sarila, Ratchet & Clank, Loving Vincent, and Saving Santa over the past two decades.

CMG facilitated the joint production of the film Ainbo: Spirit of the Amazon between the animation houses of Peru and the Netherlands. The company distributed the film to over half the world's cinema markets, and eventually released it worldwide in 2021. Other films released in the 2020s decade include Seal Team by Triggerfish Animation Studios; Panda Bear in Africa by Katuni Animation, A. Film Production, Cool Beans, Comet Filmand Le Pacte; Kayara by Tunche Films; The Canterville Ghost by Toonz Animation and Melmoth Productions; and Noah's Ark by Globo Filmes, Gullane, NIP, Symbiosys Technologies and VideoFilmes.

On January 6, 2025, Cinema Management Group filed for Chapter 7 bankruptcy. Its catalogue was later acquired by Narrative Capital Partners.

== Executives ==
Edward Noeltner is the founder of Cinema Management Group. He has served as the President of Senator Films International in Berlin, Head of Television at Pandora Cinema in Paris, Senior Vice President of International Distribution at AB Svensk Filmindustri in Stockholm/Paris, and Senior Vice President of Sales and Distribution at Miramax International in New York. Noeltner has overseen the international sales and distribution of Academy Award-winning films such as Chicago, The Hours, Frida, Shine, Kolya, Under The Sun, and Tango.

== Expansion ==
In 2008, film producer Gray Frederickson (The Godfather) brokered the sale of CMG shares to The Cleveland Family Trust, managed by Brian and Jason Cleveland, to establish the CMG Acquisitions Fund.

== Films distributed ==
=== Animated films ===
- Away
- Adventures in Zambezia
- The Adventures of the Little Prince
- Hoodwinked!
- Khumba
- Killer Bean Forever
- The Legend of Sarila
- The Littlest Angel
- Louis La Chance
- Ratchet & Clank
- Saving Santa
- Ainbo: Spirit of the Amazon
- Kayara

=== Feature films ===
- American Violet
- Blood and Bone
- Blood Out
- Brotherhood
- Carjacked
- The Collection
- The Collector
- Creature
- DeadHeads
- Demoted
- The Devil's Hand
- Eden
- Get Lucky
- Go for Sisters
- The Haunting of Molly Hartley
- Hollywood Sex Wars
- House of the Rising Sun
- The Hunted
- Iraq for Sale: The War Profiteers
- Kelin
- Liars All
- No Man's Land: The Rise of Reeker
- No Tell Motel
- Owl and the Sparrow
- The Perfect Host
- Pick Pocket (also known as Loosies)
- Plastic
- Reaching for the Moon
- Reeker
- Silent House
- Still Mine
- A Stranger in Paradise
- The Treatment
- Under Still Waters

=== Documentary films ===
- All Together Now (previously licensed)
- The Choir
- Forks Over Knives
- Gasland
- Good Hair
- Revolution
- The Trials of Darryl Hunt
- An Unlikely Weapon

==== Moriah films ====
- Echoes that Remain
- Ever Again
- Genocide
- I Have Never Forgotten You
- In Search of Peace
- It Is No Dream
- Liberation
- The Long Way Home
- The Prime Ministers
- Unlikely Heroes
- Winston Churchill: Walking with Destiny
