= Simon Wiesenthal Center =

U.S.-based Jewish human rights organization

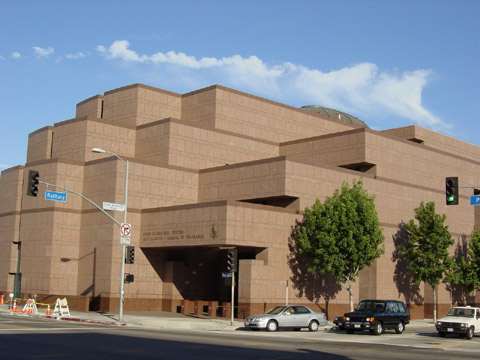
- The Museum of Tolerance in Los Angeles, California; photographed in 2001
- Named after: Simon Wiesenthal
- Founded: 1977; 49 years ago
- Founders: Marvin Hier
- Headquarters: Los Angeles, California, U.S.
- Key people: Marvin Hier, Abraham Cooper
- Revenue: US$25,359,129 (2018)
- Expenses: US$26,181,569 (2018)
- Staff: 136 (2016)
- Website: wiesenthal.com

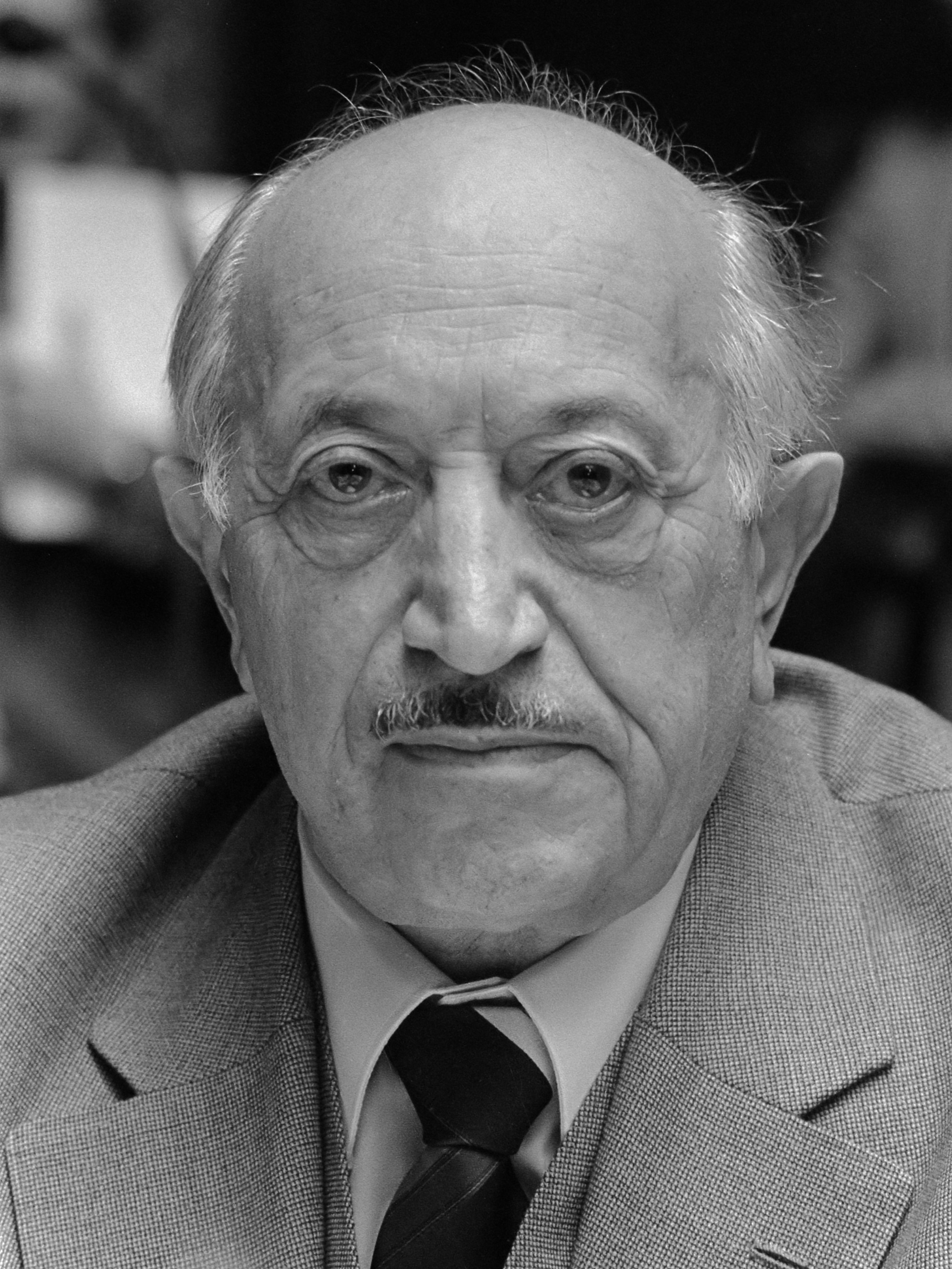
Simon Wiesenthal

The Simon Wiesenthal Center (SWC) is a Jewish human rights organization established in 1977 by Rabbi Marvin Hier. The center is known for Holocaust research and remembrance, hunting Nazi war criminals, combating antisemitism, tolerance education, defending Israel, and its Museum of Tolerance.

The center publishes a seasonal magazine, In Motion. The center has close ties to public and private agencies, and regularly meets with elected officials of the United States and foreign governments and with diplomats and heads of state. It is accredited as a non-governmental organization (NGO) at the United Nations, UNESCO, and the Council of Europe. The center is named in honor of Nazi hunter Simon Wiesenthal. Wiesenthal had nothing to do with its operation or activities other than giving its name, but he remained supportive of it. "I have received many honors in my lifetime," Wiesenthal once said, "when I die, these honors will die with me. But the Simon Wiesenthal Center will live on as my legacy."

== Leadership and organization ==
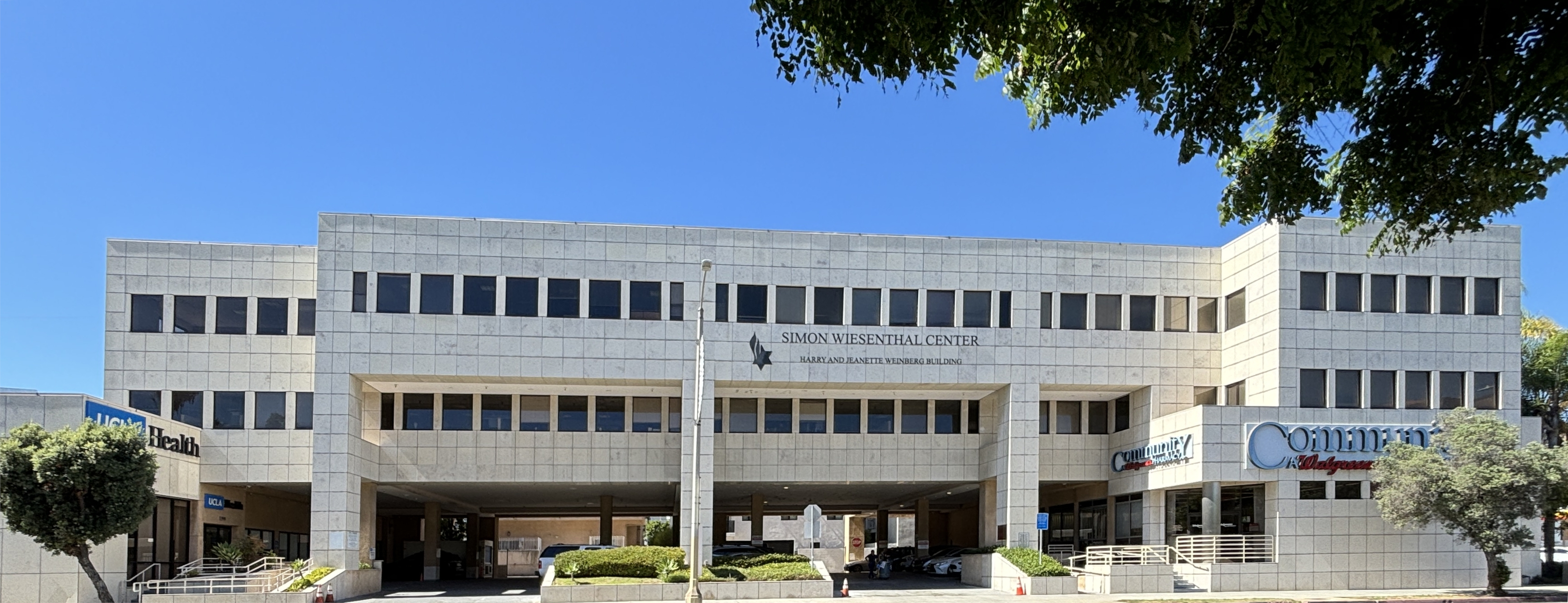
Harry and Jeanette Weinberg Building (Simon Wiesenthal Center), Los Angeles

The center is headed by Jim Berk as CEO since January 2024, Rabbi Abraham Cooper the associate dean and Director of Global Social Action Agenda and Rabbi Meyer May, the executive director. Marvin Hier's wife, Marlene Hier, is the Director of Membership development. Shimon Samuels is the Director for International Relations. In 2016, the center had 136 employees. The headquarters of the Simon Wiesenthal Center is in Los Angeles. However, there are also international offices located in New York City, Miami, Toronto, Jerusalem, Paris, Chicago, and Buenos Aires.

== Finances ==
According to Charity Navigator the center's total revenue and expenses was $25,359,129 and $26,181,569 in 2018. 52.8% of the revenue came from contributions, gifts and grants, 31.4% from fundraising events and 15.8% from government grants.

In its 2013 survey of Jewish charity compensation, the Jewish-American magazine The Forward singled out Hier as "by far the most overpaid CEO" earning double the amount of what would be expected. He and his family members received nearly $1.3 million in 2012 from the center. In 2017, The Forward again rated Hier as the most overpaid Jewish charity leader with a total salary of $818,148. Family members of his earned over $600,000 from the organization.

== History ==
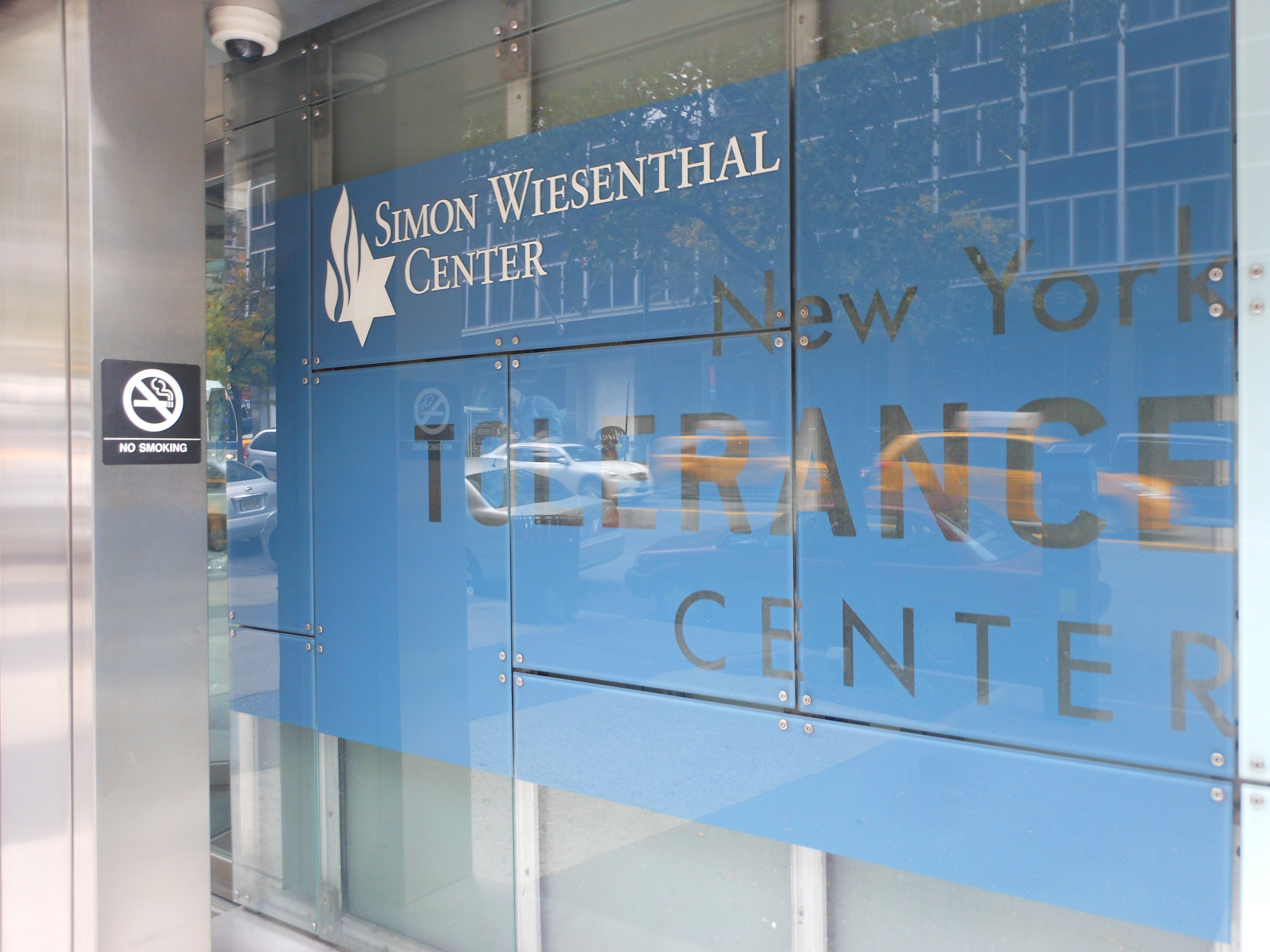
Simon Wiesenthal Tolerance Center in New York City

=== Founding ===
The founder Marvin Hier was born and raised in New York City and became an ordained rabbi at the Rabbi Jacob Joseph School. At the age of 22 he moved to Vancouver, Canada, and became the rabbi of the city's orthodox synagogue. He became friends with the mostly non-Orthodox Belzberg family who would help him fund the Simon Wiesenthal Center. In 1977, he moved to Los Angeles and bought a building on Pico Boulevard using a $500,000 donation from Samuel Belzberg which was matched with another half a million from Toronto-based real estate maven Joseph Tannenbaum. In the building he founded a yeshiva, a religious Jewish school, today known as the Yeshiva University High School of Los Angeles, and a small Holocaust museum, with Belzberg as founding chairman. Famous Nazi hunter Simon Wiesenthal was convinced to bless the museum with his name. Edward Norden, writing for Commentary, dismissed the museum as "a low-tech affair fashioned by and for Jews and holding nothing against the Gentiles back—an outsized portrait of Pius XII was given a prominent place among pictures of those who 'didn't care.' The message was that Jews have enemies, murderous enemies, and should look out." Hier, a skillful fundraiser, networked with the Hollywood célébrité, local politicians, and businessmen and raised large sums of money which he used to expand his operations.

=== Search for Nazi war criminals ===
The center used to hunt Nazi war criminals, often in collaboration with Simon Wiesenthal. Its first claim to fame came in 1979 when it successfully petitioned West Germany to revoke a statute of limitations on Nazi war criminals. Efraim Zuroff, director of the Simon Wiesenthal Center office in Jerusalem, is the coordinator of Nazi war crimes research worldwide for the Wiesenthal Center and he is also the author of its annual (since 2001) "Status Report" on the worldwide investigation and prosecution of Nazi war criminals which includes a "most wanted" list of Nazi war criminals.

In November 2005, the Simon Wiesenthal Center gave the name of four suspected former Nazi criminals to German authorities. The names were the first results of Operation Last Chance, a drive launched that year by the center to track down former Nazis for World War II-era crimes before they die of old age. According to the center, about 2,000 Nazi war criminals entered Canada illegally by providing false documents, but the Canadian government largely ignored their presence until the mid-1980s. It also claimed that when they were exposed, the government made their deportations harder to carry out. One example is Vladimir Katriuk, who the center said was involved in the Khatyn massacre in 1943 and who came to Canada in 1951. Katriuk, who denied the allegations, died in 2015 before he could be extradited to Russia to face charges.

=== Museum of Tolerance ===
In 1985, the center was incorporated separately from the yeshiva in order to bid for state funding for the construction of a bigger Holocaust museum. This bid was vociferously opposed by the American Civil Liberties Union, the Anti-Defamation League and secular Jewish organizations due to the unclear separation between the yeshiva and the center. At the time, the same persons sat on the board of both the center and the yeshiva.

Another reason for the opposition was that Los Angeles already had a Holocaust museum; the Martyrs' Memorial Museum (later renamed to the Los Angeles Museum of the Holocaust) and Hier's bid was seen as undue competition by parts of Los Angeles Jewish community which also criticized him for exploiting the memory of the Holocaust. Fred Diament, president of the Holocaust survivor group 1939 Club who helped establish the competing Martyrs' Memorial, blasted the organization in an interview with the Los Angeles Times in 1985:

As a survivor, what aggravates me is that they collect lots of money in the name of the Holocaust. And they're using lots of it for publicizing their center and also for certain sensationalist things... The style of the Wiesenthal Center [also] aggravates me. They're too commercial. You cannot package the Holocaust. It's an insult to the memory of our parents and brothers and sisters.

Rabbi Chaim Seidler-Feller, director of the Hillel Jewish Student Union at UCLA, in an interview with the same paper in 1990 claimed that he confronted Hier about the unwelcome competition:

I asked Hier why he was doing this when the Martyrs' Memorial had been in the works for 10 years and was reaching its culmination. His response was: 'We will do it bigger, better, faster--and without the survivors.' There was no regard on his part for communal niceties or respect for the survivor community. It was a venture that he viewed as competitive. Whoever had the biggest center would be king.

Wiesenthal himself, however, was fully supportive of Hier's museum. Despite the opposition and by using the connections with the Los Angeles elite Hier had formented, he secured a grant for $5 million from the state. According to Karl Katz, designer of the museum, over 10,000 Californians sent messages to the state Senate in support of the grant. The Center later netted an additional $5 million through a bill introduced by Democratic Representative Henry Waxman. One reason for the approval of the funding was that Hier in 1985 had promised to commemorate the Armenian genocide in the museum. California's governor at the time, George Deukmejian, was of Armenian descent and the legislation which approved the funding explicitly referred to the Armenian genocide, "which have so adversely affected the lives and well-being of so many human beings, through such mass murder as the Armenian genocide and the Nazi Holocaust and other genocides." In interviews Hier repeatedly assured people that the Armenian genocide would be featured.

This drew the ire of certain members of the Los Angeles Jewish community, who cited the vulnerable position of Jews in Turkey, a country that does not recognize the Armenian genocide. Hier took the position that the Armenian genocide did happen and that it should be included, regardless of any diplomatic issues. Michael Berenbaum of the Holocaust Memorial Museum in Washington praised Hier for not allowing the "rewriting of history to the exclusion of Armenian genocide." But to the Armenian community's dismay, the exhibits commemorating the Armenian genocide were removed in 1997. The museum finally opened in 1993, in an 8-story building on Pico Boulevard opposite to Hier's yeshiva. It was given the English name the Museum of Tolerance and the Hebrew name Beit HaShoah, the House of the Holocaust. The total construction costs amounted to some $50 million, with the majority of the funding coming from donations and $10 million from government funding. Today the museum hosts 350,000 visitors annually, among them 110,000 schoolchildren. Branches of the Museum have been built in New York and Jerusalem. The Center and its Museum of Tolerance is one of many partner organizations of the Austrian Service Abroad (Auslandsdienst) and the corresponding Austrian Holocaust Memorial Service (Gedenkdienst).

=== Rapid growth ===
From the very start, the center grew rapidly. In 1985 the museum claimed to have 25,000 visitors annually and the center 273,000 contributing members, including 47,000 Californians. Between 1984 and 1990 the center published seven volumes of the Simon Wiesenthal Center Annual, that focused on the scholarly study of the Holocaust. In 1990, it had become one of the largest Jewish organizations in America with 380,000 members. The same year, Sheldon Teitelbaum and Tom Waldman profiled Hier in the Los Angeles Times, describing him as the "unorthodox rabbi", and characterized his success as follows:

Yet he has apparently become something of a folk-hero among the city's 700,000 Jews; the center is perpetually deluged by $10 donations from even the most non-observant. Last year, when many other Jewish organizations had to cut corners and go begging, the center pulled in $9.7 million in contributions, and another $5.3 million for its new Museum of Tolerance (scheduled to open next year adjacent to the center on Pico Boulevard). And Hier has powerful friends who might withhold their significant contributions to many of the city's other Jewish organizations if they felt it would benefit, or avenge, him. Hier knows this. In all these ways, he has used his muscle to become one of the most imposing figures in world Jewry.

Between 1984 and 1990 the center published seven volumes of the Simon Wiesenthal Center Annual, that focused on the scholarly study of the Holocaust, broadly defined. This series is ISSN 0741-8450. The archives of the center in Los Angeles have grown to a collection of about 50,000 volumes and non-print materials.

== Branches ==
=== New York branch ===
In 2005, the New York branch of the Museum of Tolerance opened to the public under the name New York Tolerance Center, providing tolerance training to police officers, prosecutors, schoolteachers and teenagers. In its first four years, over 10,000 people, mostly law enforcement officers, underwent tolerance training at the facility. In April 2016, the New York City Council stopped funding the Tolerance Center following the arrest of a former board member who has been accused of raising $20 million from a city correctional officers' union through kickbacks. The Center stated that the member had resigned from its board on June 15, and that it was unaware of any unethical or illegal activities regarding its donors.

=== Jerusalem branch ===
A branch museum in Jerusalem, expected to be completed in 2021, sparked protests from the city's Muslim population. The museum is being built on a thousand-year-old Muslim graveyard called the Mamilla Cemetery, much of which has already been paved over. The complaints were rejected by Israel's Supreme Court, leading to a demonstration by hundreds of people in November 2008. On November 19, 2008, a group of US Jewish and Muslim leaders sent a letter to the Wiesenthal Center urging it to halt the construction of the museum on the site.

As of February 2010, the Museum of Tolerance's plan for construction has been fully approved by Israeli courts and is proceeding at the compound of Mamilla Cemetery. The courts ruled that the compound had been neglected as a spiritual site by the Muslim community, in effect not functioning as a cemetery for decades (while simultaneously used for other purposes), and was thus mundra, i.e. abandoned, under Muslim laws.

== Moriah Films ==
Moriah Films, also known as the Jack and Pearl Resnick Film Division of the SWC, was created to produce theatrical documentaries to educate both national and international audiences, with a focus on contemporary human rights and ethical issues and Jewish experience. Two films produced by the division, Genocide and The Long Way Home have received the Academy Award for Best Documentary Feature. Moriah Films has worked with numerous actors to narrate their productions. Including but not limited to Elizabeth Taylor, Michael Douglas, Nicole Kidman, Morgan Freeman, Patrick Stewart, and Sandra Bullock.

== Top ten anti-Semitic/anti-Israel slurs ==
Since 2010, the center has published annual lists of individuals who they consider to have uttered the most antisemitic or anti-Israel "slurs" for the year. The rankings have often been criticized for labeling criticism of Israel as antisemitism. Examples include Swedish Foreign Minister Margot Wallström's call for an investigation into "extra-judicial killings" by Israeli police during the Knife intifada in 2015 which the center ranked as the eight worst slur that year, and Berlin's mayor Michael Müller who the center considered placing on the list in 2016 for "mainstreaming the BDS movement that never contributes to the daily life of Palestinians." The inclusion of German journalist Jakob Augstein on their 2012 list sparked a controversy in German media.

The center's 2021 edition of its "Global Anti-Semitism Top Ten" list included in seventh place the entire country of Germany, particularly Michael Blume, the commissioner against antisemitism of the German state of Baden-Württemberg, alleging that he had liked a 2019 Facebook post equating Zionism with Nazism. Blume told the Jewish Telegraphic Agency in an interview that he has no recollection of liking any such post, and that it was possible that the post had been edited after he had liked it; he also described himself as a "friend and ally" of Israel who believes that "Zionism is fully legitimate" and that "anti-Zionism equates [to] antisemitism, pure and simple". The European Union's coordinator for combatting antisemitism, Katharina von Schnurbein, said that by including Blume on its list, the center "discredit[s] the invaluable legacy of Simon Wiesenthal". Blume's inclusion was also criticised by representatives of Baden-Württemberg's Jewish community and the Central Council of Jews in Germany. In January 2023 the Managing editor of the biggest Jewish Newspaper in Germany, jüdische Allgemeine, criticised the Wiesenthal Center for integrating Christoph Heusgen, Jakob Augstein and Michael Blume in its lists and for naming them next to terrorists and anti-Semites. He wrote with regard to the Wiesenthal Center and its lists:

The fight against anti-Semitism is too serious to be pursued in the way the Wiesenthal Center unfortunately did with the list. [...] Truth instead of fake news: For Simon Wiesenthal, that was a matter of course. Obviously, this is only a very limited part of the Simon Wiesenthal Center's self-image.

== Humanitarian Award dinners ==
The center hosts dinners during which it awards people the prizes Humanitarian Award and the less prestigious Medal of Valor. It is one of the center's main fundraising events. The winners of the Humanitarian Award for each year were:

- 1983: Jeane Kirkpatrick, American diplomat
- 1994: Margaret Thatcher, former prime minister
- 1995: Sidney Sheinberg, president and CEO of MCA Inc. and Universal Studios and his wife actress Lorraine Gary
- 1997: Jonathan Dolgen, chairman of Viacom
- 2002: Jean-Marie Messier, CEO of Vivendi
- 2008: Rupert Murdoch, media mogul
- 2011: Jeffrey Immelt, chairman and CEO of General Electric
- 2013: Jim Gianopulos, chairman and CEO of Paramount Pictures
- 2014: Ted Sarandos, Chief content officer for Netflix
- 2015: Harvey Weinstein, Co-chairman of The Weinstein Company
- 2016: Jon Feltheimer, CEO of Lions Gate Entertainment and Indra Nooyi, chairman and CEO of PepsiCo
- 2017: Ronald Meyer, vice chairman of NBCUniversal
- 2018: Leslie Moonves, chairman and CEO of CBS
- 2019: Bob Iger, chairman and CEO of The Walt Disney Company

== Official statements and controversies ==
Controversies include aiding Washington Redskins owner Dan Snyder in a lawsuit against the Washington City Paper.

=== German reunification ===
Hier was skeptical of the reunification of Germany because he feared that anti-Semitism might reemerge in a reunified Germany. On February 9, 1990, he sent a letter to Chancellor Helmut Kohl and in it, he expressed his fears: "I am not among those in the cheering section applauding the rush towards German reunification." In his reply to Hier's letter three weeks later, Kohl expressed his disappointment "at how little many opponents of German unity take note of the fact that for decades now especially the young generation in the free part of Germany has been informed without any taboos of the causes and consequences of the National Socialist tyranny: in schools, universities, church or other educational institutions and the media."

He added that East Germans are "immune to any new totalitarian temptations" and he also emphasized the fact that hate crimes are punishable with fines or prison sentences. However, the last communist premier of East Germany, Hans Modrow, wrote a letter to Hier and in it, he wrote that Hier's fears were "definitely justified in the light of the formation of a multi-party landscape." Hier welcomed the frankness of Modrow's reply, adding that "[t]he legacy of the Holocaust in a united Germany should be institutionalized. It should be on the conscience of every German from cradle to grave in a formalized way."

Later, in the early stages of the First Gulf War, the center released a report which accused Western companies of complicity in Iraq's chemical weapons program. The report said that 207 companies, 86 of which were West German, had supplied Iraq with chemical weapons components as late as 1989. German companies had sold Zyklon-B to Iraq and they also helped it build gas chambers - modeled on those which were used by the Nazis - to exterminate Iranian prisoners of war, according to the report. Kenneth R. Timmerman, who prepared the report, wrote: "The picture beginning to emerge is of a vast Iraqi pillage of the treasures of West German technology, aided and abetted by the West German authorities in their lust to increase the nation's export earnings." Despite the allegations in the report, fully endorsed by Hier, the relationship between him and Kohl remained cordial.

=== World Social Forum ===
The center is very critical of the annual World Economic Forum-alternative the World Social Forum. In 2002, the center's Shimon Samuels published in essay titled With a Clenched First and an Outstretched Arm: Antisemitism, Globalization, and the NGO Challenge in the International Area in the journal Jewish Political Studies Review run by the Jerusalem Center for Public Affairs. In the essay, he claimed that the WSF was an amalgamation of "anti-Globalism, anti-Americanism, anti-capitalism, anti-Zionism, and antisemitism."

=== Hunt Museum controversy ===
In January 2004, Shimon Samuels of the Paris branch of the center published an open letter to the president of Ireland, Mary McAleese, requesting the "Irish Museum of the Year Award" recently given to the Hunt Museum in Limerick to be retracted, until the conclusion of a demanded inquiry into the provenance of a significant number of items in the collection. In the letter he alleged that the founders of the museum, John and Gertrude Hunt, had close ties to the head of the Nazi Party (NSDP-AO) in Ireland, among others, and that the British had suspected the couple of espionage during the Second world war. The center also claimed, 'The "Hunt Museum Essential Guide" describes only 150 of the over 2000 objects in the Museum's collection and, notably, without providing information on their provenance – data that all museums are now required to provide in accordance with international procedure.'

This essentially accused the Hunt Museum in Limerick of keeping art and artifacts looted during the Second World War, which was described as "unprofessional in the extreme" by the expert Lynn Nicholas that cleared the museum of wrongdoing. The claim was taken so seriously that the examination was supervised by the prestigious Royal Irish Academy, whose 2006 report is available online. McAleese, who had been written to by the center, then criticized Samuels for "a tissue of lies", adding that the center had diminished the name of Simon Wiesenthal. The center said that it had prepared its own 150-page report in May 2008 that would be published after vetting by its lawyers, but had not done so as of November 2008. The report was finally made on December 12, 2008.

=== Accusations of antisemitism against Hugo Chávez ===
The Center criticized Hugo Chávez for various statements, including a statement in his Christmas speech in 2005:

The world is for all of us, then, but it so happens that a minority, the descendants of the same ones that crucified Christ, the descendants of the same ones that kicked Bolivar out of here and also crucified him in their own way over there in Santa Marta, in Colombia.

A minority has taken possession of all the wealth of the world. A minority has taken ownership of all of the gold of the planet, of the silver, of the minerals, the waters, the good lands, oil, of the wealth, and have concentrated the wealth in a few hands.

Less than 10 percent of the population of the world owns more than half of the wealth of the world, more than the population of the planet is poor, and each day there are more poor people in the whole world.

The reference was to Simon Bolívar, a South American folk hero who led several countries to independence from Spain in the 19th century. But the center in its press release omitted the reference to Bolívar and quoted Chávez as follows: "the world has wealth for all, but some minorities, the descendants of the same people that crucified Christ, have taken over all the wealth of the world." It asserted that he was referring to Jews, and denounced the remarks as antisemitic by way of his allusions to wealth. The American Jewish Committee, the American Jewish Congress, and the Confederation of Jewish Associations of Venezuela defended Chávez, stating that he was speaking not of Jews, but of South America's white oligarchy. The center's representative in Latin America replied that Chávez's mention of Christ-killers was "ambiguous at best" and that the "decision to criticize Chávez had been taken after careful consideration".

=== 2006 Iranian sumptuary law hoax ===
In the spring of 2006, Douglas Kelly, the editor of the Canadian National Post found a column by Iranian in exile, Amir Taheri, alleging that the Iranian parliament might force minorities to wear identifiable clothing. Kelly phoned the center and spoke with Abraham Cooper and Hier who both confirmed the story as "absolutely true." On May 18, 2006, one day before Kelly's story was to be published, the center wrote a letter to United Nations Secretary General Kofi Annan urging the international community to pressure Iran to drop the measure. The letter characterized Taheri as "a well known and well respected analyst on Iranian affairs" and claimed that "a consensus has developed regarding color badges to be worn by non-Moslems: yellow for Jews, red for Christians, blue for Zoroastrians and other colors for other religions." At that point, neither Cooper nor Hier had actually tried to verify the story.

The day after, Taylor Marsh called Aaron Breitbart, a researcher at the center to verify the story. He too said that the story was "very true" and "very scary." He added that Hier had been on the phone for four hours to confirm the story, something Marsh found odd and she wondered how the confirmation could have taken four hours. The same day the story was published, several Iranian experts doubted its veracity and it was soon found out to have been a complete fabrication by Taheri. The newspaper that published the story retracted it and apologized for it, but the center never did apologize and refused to admit any mistake on their part.

=== Conflict with the Committee for Charity and Support for the Palestinians ===
On March 8, 2007, the head of international relations for the Simon Wiesenthal Center, Stanley Trevor Samuels, was convicted (and later acquitted in an appeal) of defamation by a Paris courthouse for accusing the French-based Committee for Charity and Support for the Palestinians (CBSP) of sending funds to the families of Palestinian suicide bombers.

In its filing of the suit, the CBSP labelled the accusations "ridiculous", stating that its charitable work consisted of providing aid to some 3,000 Palestinian orphans. The court ruled that documents produced by the Wiesenthal Center established no "direct or indirect participation in financing terrorism" on the part of the CBSP, and that the allegations were "seriously defamatory". The Wiesenthal Center appealed the court ruling, and the appeal was granted in July 2009.

=== Opposition to Park51 ===
The Simon Wiesenthal Center opposed the construction of Park51, a Muslim community center in Manhattan in New York, because the planned location was only two blocks away from Ground Zero where the September 11 attacks had taken place. The executive director of the center's Museum of Tolerance in Manhattan, Meyer May said it was "insensitive" to locate the centre there. The Jewish Week noted that the center itself was accused of intolerance when it built a museum in Jerusalem on land that was once a Muslim cemetery, after gaining approval from Israeli courts.

=== Band attire controversies ===
The center has on two occasions criticized bands for wearing attire resembling Nazi uniforms or using Nazi symbolism. In 2011, Abraham Cooper, condemned the Japanese band Kishidan for wearing uniforms resembling those of the SS, the armed wing of the Nazi party. The band wore military-inspired uniforms, adorned with the German medal Iron Cross and Nazi insignia such as the death skull and SS eagle on MTV Japan's primetime program "Mega Vector". Cooper said in a written protest to the band's management company Sony Music Artists, MTV Japan and the Japanese entertainment group Avex (Kishidan's label at the time being and also the current one) that "there is no excuse for such an outrage" and that "many young Japanese are "woefully uneducated" about the crimes against humanity committed by Nazi Germany and Japan during the Second World War, but global entities like MTV and Sony Music should know better". As a result, Sony Music Artists and Avex issued a joint statement of public apology on their respective websites.

On November 11, 2018, Cooper denounced the South Korean band BTS with the following statement: "Flags appearing on stage at their concert were eerily similar to the Nazi Swastika. It goes without saying that this group, which was invited to speak at the UN, owes the people of Japan and the victims of the Nazism an apology." The band's management responded to the charge and offered their "sincerest apologies" but claimed that the similarities with Nazi symbols were unintentional.

=== Relationship with Barack Obama ===
The center was a harsh critic of president Barack Obama's Middle Eastern policy. In May 2011, Obama proposed that "the borders of Israel and Palestine should be based on the 1967 lines with mutually agreed swaps" which implied that Israel should withdraw from most of the territory it occupied in the Six-Day War in 1967. The proposal drew ire from the center which claimed that such a withdrawal "would be Auschwitz borders for Israel," alluding to the infamous Auschwitz concentration camp. In December 2016 it ranked the Obama administration's refusal to veto a UN resolution condemning Israeli settlement construction as the most anti-semitic/anti-Israel incident that year. The center wrote "The most stunning 2016 U.N. attack on Israel was facilitated by President Obama when the U.S. abstained on a U.N. Security Council resolution condemning Israel for settlement construction."

=== Opposition to the BDS movement ===
In 2013, the SWC released a report on the BDS movement which calls for boycotting Israel until it stops the occupation and discrimination against Palestinian citizens, and allows the Palestinian refugees to return. The report claimed that BDS is a "thinly-disguised effort to coordinate and complement the violent strategy of Palestinian, Arab, and Muslim 'rejectionists' who have refused to make peace with Israel for over six decades, and to pursue a high-profile campaign composed of anti-Israel big lies to help destroy the Jewish State by any and all means". The report also said that BDS attacks Israel's entire economy and society, holding all (Jewish) Israelis as collectively guilty.

=== Relationship with Donald Trump ===
In 2017, Hier faced harsh criticism from the Jewish-American community for accepting an invitation by the Trump campaign to hold a prayer at the president elect's inauguration. Hier defended his decision by saying that he had offered his blessings to presidential candidates before. That didn't placate his critics who claimed that Trump was a different kind of president who targeted minorities and had at times used tropes considered by many to be antisemitic. Criticism came from Peter Beinart writing in The Forward that "they will reserve a special mention for the Simon Wiesenthal Center's Rabbi Marvin Hier. Last week, Trump rewarded him by asking him to offer an inaugural prayer." In an interview in The Times of Israel in 2019 Hier praised Trump for his decision to relocate the US embassy in Israel to Jerusalem and to recognize the Golan Heights as Israeli territory: "Speaking as a Jew, so many presidents talked about making Jerusalem the capital of Israel. They made nice speeches, but in the end they couldn't deliver. Trump delivered."

Hier and his wife have participated in fundraising events for Trump's 2020 reelection campaign. The center has also at times criticized Trump. In January 2018 it asked the president to withdraw his statements about wanting more immigration from places from Norway, rather than from "shithole countries" like Haiti and those in Africa. Hier and the Kushner family who are Trump's in-laws (related via Jared Kushner) have known each other for decades. The Kushner family has made several large donations to the center via the Charles and Seryl Kushner Family Foundation.

=== Black Hebrew Israelite awareness ===
In 2022, the Center published their first report about antisemites of the Black Hebrew Israelite movement. The report profiled the Israelites' belief system, in the wake of the Hebrews to Negroes: Wake Up Black America documentary, promoted by NBA star Kyrie Irving. The documentary contained antisemitic tropes, Holocaust denial, and claims of an international Jewish conspiracy. The center reported that individuals motivated by Black Hebrew Israelitism committed five religiously motived murders between 2019 and 2022. The report stated that BHIs believe that Jewish people are "imposters", who have "stolen" Black American's true racial and religious identity, and that Black Hebrew Israelites promulgate the anti-semitic Khazar conspiracy theory about Jewish origins.

=== Ben and Jerry's ===
In December 2023, the Wiesenthal Center renewed objections to Anuradha Mittal, head of the board of directors at Ben & Jerry's via X, accusing Ben & Jerry's of "justifying" the October 7 massacre by Hamas. The tweet included a photo of Mittal, causing her to receive hate emails, tweets, and LinkedIn messages, leading to Mittal expressing her objection to the Wiesenthal Center's tweet which made her feel unsafe.

== Reception ==
Simon Wiesenthal, the Holocaust survivor the center is named after, remained a strong supporter of Hier and his center. In an interview with the Los Angeles Times in 1990 he said: "The man is never quiet. He is always trying to do things no one else has ever tried. I know that he makes other Jewish organizations nervous. This center is young and aggressive. I hope this aggressivity will survive me."

Wendy Brown in her 2009 dissertation criticized the use of tolerance for what she identified as a "Zionist political agenda of the Wiesenthal Center", and the museum, for offering a one-sided view of the Israeli–Palestinian conflict. Lawrence Swaim in 2012 criticized the center for conflating criticism of Israel with anti-Semitism and said the center's political agenda "includes public hate-mongering of Muslims, regular appeals to a neofascist form of Zionism, and relentless provocations to religious war in Israel/Palestine." In Beyond Chutzpah, Norman Finkelstein accuses the center of exaggerating and fabricating anti-Semitism for monetary gain.

== In popular culture ==
The center is featured in the movie Freedom Writers. An exterior view of the center is given, and there are scenes inside the museum, showing simulation entrances to gas chambers in death camps.

== See also ==
- AMCHA Initiative
- Hind Rajab Foundation
