= Abraham Cooper (rabbi) =

American rabbi (born 1950)

Rabbi Abraham Cooper
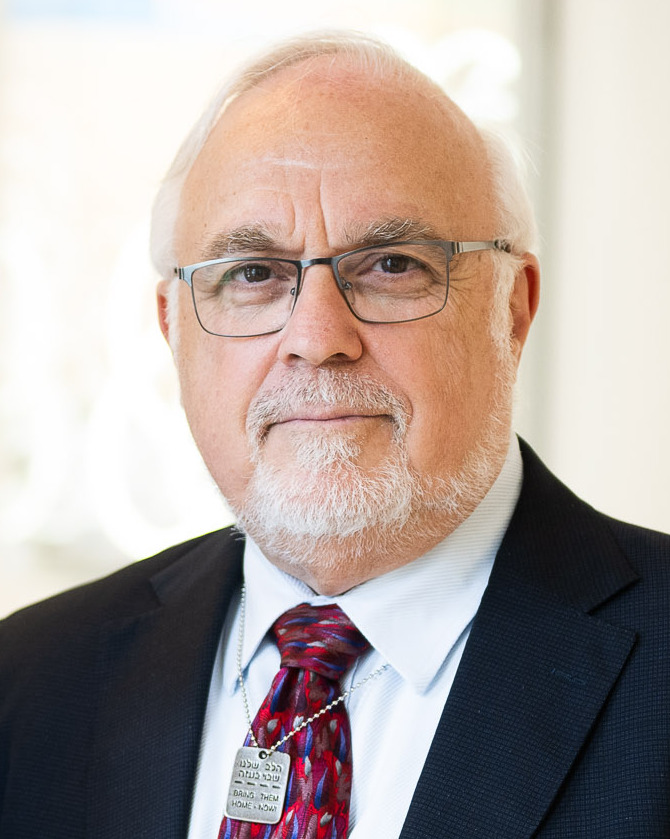
- Cooper, 2024
- Born: 1950 (age 74–75); New York City, U.S.
- Occupation: Rabbi

Abraham Cooper (born 1950) is an American rabbi. He is the associate dean and director of Global Social Action Agenda for the Simon Wiesenthal Center, a Jewish human rights organization. He is chairman emeritus of the United States Commission on International Religious Freedom.

== Career ==
Rabbi Cooper has his B.A. and M.S. degrees from Yeshiva University and a Ph.D. from the Jewish University of America. He is a recipient of Yeshiva University’s Bernard Revel Community Service Leadership Memorial Award and of the Orthodox Union’s National Leadership Award.

In the early 1970s, Cooper was involved in visiting Soviet Refuseniks, ultimately leading to his work to open the first Jewish cultural center in Moscow in the 1980s, and lecturing at the Soviet Academy of Sciences and the Sakharov Foundation later in his career.

In 1977, he came to Los Angeles to work with Rabbi Marvin Hier who founded the Simon Wiesenthal Center. Together with Rabbi Hier, Rabbi Cooper has met with world leaders, including Pope Benedict XVI, presidents, and foreign ministers.

In 1990, Cooper gave Public Enemy's Chuck D a "conscious-raising” tour of the Holocaust Museum. “I think Chuck has an open mind on certain levels,” he said. “He may be ignorant of some of our history, but he’s not an anti-Semite.” The tour was in response to Rabbi Cooper's frustration with the American music industry, specifically the fact the record labels were releasing music with lyrics that were bigoted and/or racist.

In 1992 he publicly commented about the lyrics to Ice Cube's diss track No Vaseline, in which Cube advocated violence against Jerry Heller, whom he identified as a "white Jew": "We're not asking Ice Cube to mask the reality of the streets," he said. "By all means flag the social problems, but don't exploit them by turning a professional spat between a former manager and an artist into a racial dispute." Cube responded, "It's wrong for the rabbi to call me anti-Semitic. I respect Jewish people because they're unified. I wish black people were as unified."

In 1992, and again in 2003, he helped coordinate international conferences in Paris on antisemitism cosponsored by UNESCO.

In 1997, he coordinated the center's international conference, "Property and Restitution-The Moral Debt to History" in Geneva, Switzerland.

He has testified before the United Nations in New York and Geneva, presented testimony at the US Senate, the Japanese Diet, the French Parliament, the OSCE and is a founding member of Israel's Global Forum on Antisemitism.

In 2003 Rabbi Cooper served on the transition team for Governor-elect of California Arnold Schwarzenegger.

In February 2004, Rabbi Cooper traveled to Khartoum and was the first Jewish leader to meet with the leadership of Sudan including President Omar al-Bashir to discuss human rights and terrorism- related issues. He has met with King Hussein, King Abdullah and Prince Hassan of Jordan, former Indonesian President Abdurrahman Wahid and then Grand Mufti of Egypt, Sheik Tantawi.

In 2005, Rabbi Cooper participated in an international conference on terrorism convened in Madrid on the first anniversary of the infamous train bombings in Spain's capital.

Rabbi Cooper is a regular op-ed contributor to The New York Times, The Washington Post, the Los Angeles Times, the Miami Herald, USA Today, the Chicago Tribune, the Globe and Mail, National Post, Le Monde, the Japan Times, The Straits Times and Midstream magazine. He supervises the center's Digital Terrorism and Hate Project.

He has written the World Book Encyclopedia's entry on Raoul Wallenberg and edited two major works on this Holocaust hero.

In 2016 Cooper was honored with the Rabbi Samuel S. and A. Irma Cohon Memorial Foundation Award.

In 2017 Cooper welcomed the King of Bahrain Hamad bin Isa Al Khalifa at the Simon Wiesenthal Center in Los Angeles together with Marvin Hier, paving the way for the Abraham Accords via Track II diplomacy.

In 2019 Rabbi Cooper attended the Peace to Prosperity conference in Bahrain.

Newsweek/Daily Beast lists Rabbi Cooper among the “50 Most Influential Rabbis in the United States".

Rabbi Cooper was the 2022-2023 vice-chairman, then the 2023-2024 chairman of the U.S. Commission on International Religious Freedom (USCIRF). On the day of his last election, he declared: "USCIRF has long amplified the voices of people around the world whose governments seek to silence and persecute them for expressing the religion of their choice, or for choosing not to practice any religion at all".

== See also ==
- History of the Jews in Los Angeles
