= CBSP =

CBSP can refer to:

- Centralne Biuro Śledcze Policji
- Committee for Charity and Support for the Palestinians
