= Moriah Films =

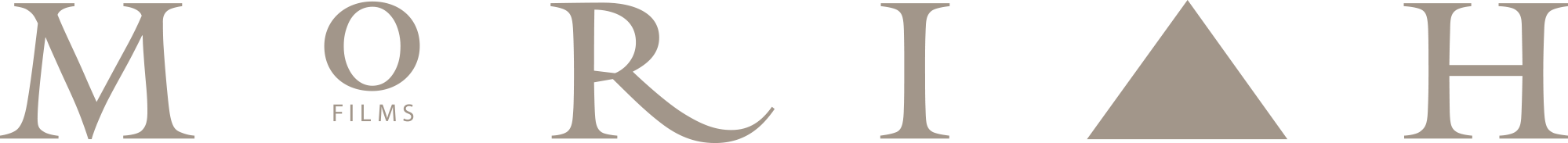
- Industry: Film Industry
- Founded: 1980
- Founder: Rabbi Marvin Hier
- Headquarters: Los Angeles
- Key people: Rabbi Marvin Hier; Arnold Schwartzman
- Website: www.moriahfilms.com

Moriah Films is the Jack and Pearl Resnick Film Division of the Simon Wiesenthal Center.

Moriah's newest film, Never Stop Dreaming: The Life and Legacy of Shimon Peres was acquired by Netflix and is set to be released in late 2020/early 2021 as a Netflix Original Documentary.

== Films ==
=== Genocide ===
In 1981, Moriah Films released its first documentary, Genocide.

=== Echoes That Remain ===
In 1991, Moriah released its second feature Echoes That Remain, a documentary focused on Eastern European Jewry prior to the events of the Holocaust. Original material was written by Sir Martin Gilbert and Rabbi Marvin Hier, one of the film's producers, with a screenplay by Arnold Schwartzman, who also directed. Narrated by Martin Landau and Miriam Margolyes, with an original score written and conducted by Carl Davis, the film won the 1992 Houston International Film Festival's Gold Special Jury Award. Photos taken by the famed photographer of Eastern European Jewry Roman Vishniac appear throughout the film along with new footage shot by the filmmakers in the sites of former Jewish communities.

=== Liberation ===
In 1995, Moriah Films’ third production Liberation had its premiere at the 1995 Berlinale, where it was a selection of that festival’s Panorama section. Liberation covers the Allied forces and their campaign to liberate Europe starting on D-Day in June 1944 and ending in May 1945 on VE Day. The film also examines how the Allies liberated Hitler’s death camps during this same period. Narrated by Ben Kingsley, Patrick Stewart, and Whoopi Goldberg.

=== The Long Way Home ===
The Long Way Home was Moriah Films’ fourth film. It won the Academy Award for Best Documentary Feature in 1998. It had its premiere at the 1997 Sundance Film Festival where it was a selection for the Documentary Competition. The film also won the Gold Hugo at the Chicago Film Festival that year and won the Best Documentary award at the 1997 Palm Springs International Film Festival.

The Long Way Home tells the story of the Jewish refugees in Europe after World War Two and the liberation of the death camps.

The Long Way Home is narrated by Morgan Freeman.

=== In Search Of Peace ===
In 2001, Moriah released In Search of Peace, Part One. The documentary examines Israel’s first two decades and is based on original material written by Sir Martin Gilbert and Rabbi Marvin Hier with a screenplay written by Richard Trank, who also directed.

Narrated by Michael Douglas, and featuring the voices of Edward Asner, Anne Bancroft, Richard Dreyfus, and Michael York.

=== Unlikely Heroes ===
In 2004, Moriah released its sixth film, Unlikely Heroes, which chronicled seven different stories of resistance during the Holocaust. Narrated by Ben Kingsley, Unlikely Heroes had its premiere at the Full Frame Documentary Film Festival in 2004.

=== Beautiful Music ===
In 2005, Moriah released its first documentary short, Beautiful Music, about the relationship between an Orthodox Jewish piano teacher and her blind, autistic Palestinian musical savant student. Teacher and student live in neighboring communities outside of Jerusalem.

Narrated by Brooke Shields, Beautiful Music had its premiere at the Hollywood Film Festival in 2007 where it won Best Documentary. An original score was composed by Lee Holdridge.

=== Ever Again ===
In 2006, Moriah released Ever Again, a documentary that examined the resurgence of anti-Semitism in Europe and the United States. The film was narrated by Kevin Costner. An original score was composed and conducted by Lee Holdridge.

=== I Have Never Forgotten You ===
In 2007, Moriah released I Have Never Forgotten You, a documentary based on the life and legacy of Simon Wiesenthal, who became known for his pursuits as a Nazi hunter, humanitarian and writer. The film examined Wiesenthal’s life in what is now Ukraine before the war, his experiences during the Holocaust where he and his wife lost more than 80 members of their combined families and why the trained architect gave up his career to find and bring Nazi war criminals to justice.

Narrated by Nicole Kidman, it film premiered at the Berlin International Film Festival in 2007 and was a selection of the Documentary Competition of the Tribeca Film Festival that same year. It was also screened and won a special mention award at the Jerusalem Film Festival in 2007.

=== Against The Tide ===
In 2009, Moriah released its tenth feature, Against The Tide,. Narrated by Dustin Hoffman, the film examined the story of Peter Bergson, a Jewish activist who fought to change restrictive US immigration laws during the Holocaust era in order to rescue the Jews of Europe, an effort which saved more than 250,000 people in the final year of the war.

Based on original material written by Rabbi Marvin Hier and Richard Trank, with a screenplay by Trank, the script for the film was nominated for Best Original Documentary Screenplay by the Writers Guild of America. It was directed by Trank and was also screened at the Tribeca Film Festival.

=== Winston Churchill: Walking With Destiny ===
In 2010, Moriah released Winston Churchill: Walking With Destiny, narrated by Ben Kingsley. The documentary examines the 20 month period between Winston Churchill becoming Britain’s Prime Minister in May 1940 as England was fighting Germany on its own after WWII began in September 1939 and America’s entry into the war in 1941.

Based on Sir Martin Gilbert’s book Churchill and the Jews, the screenplay was written by Richard Trank. Trank also directed and produced along with Rabbi Marvin Hier. Featuring interviews with Winston S. Churchill (the grandson of Winston Churchill), Celia Sandys (granddaughter of Churchill), Dame Vera Lynn and historians Doris Kearns Goodwin and John Lukacs, Lee Holdridge composed and conducted the film’s musical score.

=== It Is No Dream: the Life of Theodor Herzl ===
In 2012, Moriah released It Is No Dream, a film which documents the life and legacy of Theodor Herzl, considered to be the father of Modern Zionism. The film was narrated by Ben Kingsley and starred the voice of Christoph Waltz as Theodor Herzl.

Based on original material written by Rabbi Marvin Hier and Richard Trank, its screenplay was written by Trank who also directed. An original score was composed and conducted by Lee Holdridge. The film premiered at the Jerusalem Film Festival’s winter program in 2012.

=== The Prime Ministers: The Pioneers ===
In 2013, Moriah released The Prime Ministers: The Pioneers, the first film in a two-part series about the history of modern day Israel based on the book, "The Prime Ministers" by Ambassador Yehuda Avner. Its screenplay was written by Richard Trank who also directed.

The film had its debut at the Jerusalem Film Festival. The film follows Ambassador Avner over the course of his career during which he worked for Prime Ministers Levi Eshkol and Golda Meir, as well as when he served as an aide to the Israeli Ambassador to the US Yitzhak Rabin in the late 1960’s.

The film features the voices of Sandra Bullock as Golda Meir, Michael Douglas as Yitzhak Rabin, Leonard Nimoy as Levi Eshkol, and Christoph Waltz as Menachem Begin. An original musical score was composed and conducted by Lee Holdridge.

==== The Prime Ministers: Soldiers and Peacemakers ====
In 2015, Moriah released The Prime Ministers: Soldiers and Peacemakers, as a follow-up film to The Prime Ministers: The Pioneers. The film was based on the book by Ambassador Yehuda Avner. The film held its premiere at the Jerusalem Jewish Film Festival. Whereas the first film focused on the founding Prime Ministers of Israel, Soldiers and Peacemakers looked at Yitzhak Rabin, Menachem Begin, and Shimon Peres. The film explores Avner's decision to work for Menachem Begin, Anwar Sadat's visit to Jerusalem, the Camp David Accords, difficulties between President Carter and Begin and tensions between Israel and the US during the 1982 Lebanon War. The film was narrated by Michael Douglas as Yitzhak Rabin and Christoph Waltz as Menachem Begin.

=== Our Boys ===
In 2015, Moriah released its second short subject documentary Our Boys, which had its premiere at the Jerusalem International Film Festival.

=== Never Stop Dreaming: The Life and Legacy of Shimon Peres ===
In 2016, Moriah began working on Never Stop Dreaming: The Life and Legacy of Shimon Peres, a film based on the life of Shimon Peres, Israel's 9th president and two-time prime minister. Nine months after production began on the film, President Peres died due to complications of a stroke and work on the film continued focusing on his legacy.

The film is narrated by George Clooney.
