= Kayara =

- Spanish theatrical release poster
- Directed by: Cesar Zelada
- Written by: Brian Cleveland; Jason Cleveland; Cesar Zelada
- Produced by: Dirk Hampel; Jose Zelada; Sergio Zelada
- Starring: Naomi Serrano; Nate Begle; Charles Gonzales
- Music by: Toni M. Mir
- Production companies: B-Water Studios; Tunche Films
- Distributed by: Cinecolor Films
- Release dates: 2 January 2025 (Ukraine); 6 March 2025 (Peru); 30 April 2025 (Spain)
- Running time: 90 minutes
- Countries: Peru; Spain
- Language: English
- Box office: $1.8 million

Kayara is a 2025 animated adventure film directed and written by Cesar Zelada. The film stars Naomi Serrano as the titular character, who dreams of joining the all-male Chasqui messenger group, and challenges traditions and gender norms to pursue her ambition.

== Premise ==
Long ago, the Inca Messengers (Chasquis), were fast, strong and exclusively male. Determined to become the first female to break into the exclusive league of the Incan Empire’s messengers, Kayara embarks on a daring quest. Along the way she defends the undiscovered Golden City from the great dangers of exploitation and saves her friends and family from unexpected threats.

— Cinema Management Group

== Cast ==
- Naomi Serrano as Kayara, a 16-year old Inca girl athlete
- Nate Begle as Martin
- Charles Gonzales as Paullu

== Release ==
On 9 June 2022, Cinema Management Group acquired the worldwide sales to the film. On 19 December 2024, the film was announced to be released in 2025. The film was first released in Ukraine on 2 January 2025. It was later released in Peru on 6 March 2025.
