= Ainbo: Spirit of the Amazon =

2021 animated adventure film

- Theatrical release poster
- Directed by: José Zelada; Richard Claus
- Screenplay by: Brian Cleveland; Jason Cleveland; Richard Claus; Larry Wilson
- Story by: José Zelada
- Produced by: Richard Claus; César Zelada; José Zelada; Sergio Zelada; Edward Noeltner
- Starring: Lola Raie; Rene Mujica; Naomi Serrano; Alejandra Gollas; Bernardo De Paula; Joe Hernandez; Thom Hoffman; Dino Andrade; Yeni Álvarez; Susana Ballesteros; Gerardo Prat; Rico Sola
- Edited by: Job ter Burg
- Music by: Vidjay Beerepoot
- Production companies: Tunche Films; Katuni Animation; Cool Beans; EPIC Cine; Comet Film
- Distributed by: Cinema Management Group
- Release date: 13 February 2021 (Ukraine)
- Running time: 89 minutes
- Countries: Peru; Netherlands; Germany
- Languages: English; Spanish; Dutch
- Budget: $10 million
- Box office: $9.7 million

Ainbo: Spirit of the Amazon (Spanish: Ainbo: La guerrera del Amazonas, Ainbo: The Amazon Warrior; stylized as AINBO: Spirit of the Amazon), also known as simply Ainbo, is a 2021 animated adventure comedy film co-directed by José Zelada and Richard Claus, with story by Zelada. Produced by Tunche Films and Cool Beans, Cinema Management Group oversees worldwide distribution. The plot follows an adventurous girl named Ainbo, who, along with her animal spirit guides, sets out to save her jungle paradise in the Amazon from loggers and miners. The film is noted as an authentic description of the Peruvian Amazon rainforest folklore.

An international co-production of Peru, the Netherlands and Germany, Ainbo was released in Ukraine on 13 February 2021, followed by the Czech Republic and Italy on Earth Day (22 April). The film was released in France on July 14, 2021, and will be distributed by Signature Entertainment for UK and Rialto Distribution for Australia and New Zealand later on September 16, 2021. Critics noted the film delivers messages and themes centered around ecology.

== Plot ==
In the uncharted civilization of Candámo, hidden in the deepest jungles of Amazon, a 13-year-old girl named Ainbo dreams to be her tribe's best huntress. She is best friends with the chief Huarinka's daughter Zumi, whose family informally adopted Ainbo after her mother's death. However, the day Zumi is going to be crowned new chief of Candámo, Ainbo is shocked to find two animal spirits, armadillo Dillo and tapir Vaca, who claim to be Zumi's spirit guides against the Yacuruna, the mysterious curse that threatens the jungle. Ainbo runs to bring the tribe the news, but the bumbling spirits don't come to her call, making the tribe believe she is lying.

The girls' caretaker Chuni promises Ainbo to tell her about her mother, who was also in contact with spirits, but Chuni is found dead in her bed next day, and Ainbo runs away distraught. Believing Ainbo to be responsible, hunter Atok goes rogue and chases after her. Meanwhile, Ainbo is told by the spirits that she must go on a quest in order to stop the Yacuruna, which she accidentally encounters as a mysterious, western man with sorcerous powers, Cornell DeWitt, who leads a destructive logging and mining company through the rainforest. After another brief encounter with Atok, Ainbo and the spirits finally meet the most powerful mother spirit in the Amazon, turtle Motelo Mama, which reveals to her that her mother's spirit lives in Ainbo's favorite tree. Motelo Mama also redirects her to the next stage in her quest, the giant sloth spirit Pelejo, who will give her a moon rock dagger to wake up the tree.

After a difficult travel to Pelejo's volcano, Ainbo returns to the tribe with the dagger. But she finds there a new trouble. Atok and Zumi met DeWitt, who claimed to be a botanist, and brought him to Candámo after he promised to cure their illnesses and the curse in exchange for the gold found on their lands. Recognizing him as the Yacuruna, Ainbo tries to warn Zumi, but they argue about it and Zumi banishes her from their tribe. Still, Atok witnesses DeWitt brainwashing Zumi and Huarinka with his powers, so he realizes Ainbo was right all along and joins forces with her. The two use the dagger and summon the spirit of Ainbo's mother, Lizeni, who gives them a blessed arrow that can stop the Yacuruna. The girl also learns Atok loved her mother, but she did not reciprocate and he became bitter as a result.

Lizeni stops the mining company and confronts the Yacuruna while he is taking over the tribe, revealing him to be actually an evil spirit possessing a man named Will. The Yacuruna unleash his powers, holds Zumi hostage, and builds a gigantic mechanical scorpion with his company's bulldozers, which he uses to attack Ainbo and Atok. Though insecure due to her lack of talent with the bow, Ainbo finds her confidence with Lizeni's help and manages to hit the Yacuruna with the arrow, vanquishing the spirit and freeing Will and Zumi. It is revealed Will is Ainbo's father, and after reuniting with his family and receiving from Atok the promise to raise Ainbo, Lizeni and Will depart to the spirit world. Mending their friendship, Ainbo and Zumi promise to lead the tribe to a new future.

== Cast ==
- Lola Raie as Ainbo, an adventurous young girl who was born in the Amazon Rainforest. She was raised by Chuni and is a naive, adventurous, joyful huntress in training.
- Bernardo De Paula as Huarinka, chief and veteran warrior of the Candámo Tribe and Zumi's father.
- Naomi Serrano as Zumi, Chief Huarinka's daughter who is Ainbo's best friend. She is of a royal family and unlike Ainbo, she is disengaged with nature.
- Alejandra Gollas as Chuni, Candámo's eldest member and caretaker for Zumi and Ainbo. She promised Lizeni to raise Ainbo.
- Joe Hernandez as Vaca, an overweight red South American tapir and Ainbo's spirit guide and Dillo's best friend. Vaca is strong, patient, clumsy, and funny.
- Dino Andrade as Dillo, a scrawny grey nine-banded armadillo and Ainbo's spirit guide and Vaca's best friend. He is funny, smooth, smart talker, and hyperactive.
- Susana Ballesteros as Motelo Mama, the ancient giant tortoise spirit and protector of the Amazon. The Amazon biome rests on top of Motelo Mama's shell.
- Rene Mujica as Atok, an antagonistic member of Ainbo's tribe.
- Yeni Álvarez as Lizeni, Ainbo's deceased mother.
- Rico Sola as Pelejo.
- Gerardo Prat as Conibo.
- Thom Hoffman as Cornell DeWitt, the CEO of an illegal mining and logging operation.

== Production ==
=== Development ===
“Ainbo gives us the opportunity to show the Amazon in a more honest, authentic and faithful way— from an indigenous viewpoint. I think that because it's imagined and designed by the 'sons of the Amazon,' Ainbo has that unique touch that will make an impact on audiences. Hopefully, it will open a window for the world to see the Amazon in new ways.”

— Director José Zelada on the philosophy of the film Ainbo: Spirit of the Amazon

José Zelada and Richard Claus who has previously worked on films such as The Little Vampire 3D collaborated as directors for the upcoming 3D Amazon adventure film. One of Peru's leading visual effects studio, Tunche Films will be the main animation production studio located in Miraflores to animate Peruvian feature film: Ainbo: Spirit of the Amazon. It will be the first major animated film from the animation house ever since its founding in 2003 by director José Zelada and brothers Sergio and César Zelada. Its sister company EPIC Cine-Peru will join production with Netherlands-based studio Cool Beans and Dutch animation house Katuni.

The original story is by José Zelada while the producers will be the Zelada brothers as well as Richard Claus. Pierre Salazar from Peru is in charge of production design who has previously worked on such projects as Happy Feet. Cinema Management Group (CMG), an executive production Hollywood group from Beverly Hills, agreed to produce and distribute the film. Luis Pages from Weta Workshop joined the animation studio that also features an international cast of animators from Peru to Netherlands.

Principal photography began in 2017. At the Ventana Sur (Argentina's audiovisual festival) 'Animation!' event in January 2017, one of Latin America's prestigious film festivals alongside Mexico's Pixelatl festival, CMG President Ed Noeltner met with the Zelada brothers and signed a distribution deal. The animated pitch for the film had potential as Ed Noeltner says, "Ainbo was the most commercial and attractive animation project we'd seen in a while. The themes and indigenous character designs have a universal appeal and we're looking forward to a successful collaboration in making Ainbo a worldwide hit."

José Zelada says, work for the film started seven years before the eventful meeting at Ventana Sur: "Ainbo, we saved it about seven years ago and decided to go in November to Ventana Sur, which is a film market in Argentina, and we took the project, we dusted it...We managed to get enough reception, and we managed to place it, sell it to a Hollywood producer."

César Zelada Mathews contributed to bringing in Richard Claus' Amsterdam-based studio Cool Beans to collaborate with Tunche Films and its sister studio Comet Film as a co-production company. Therefore, Ainbo became an international jco-production. At a Paris meeting, Claus read the script, that became the starting point for an international collaboration project. The studios from Grünwald, Amsterdam and Lima joined into one single unit. However, initially the venture was met by the constraints of the language barrier as well as staying focused on the ambitious cinematographic milestones despite the constrained budget. The challenges became a learning opportunity as the team from the Americas over time synchronized with their colleagues in Europe on task flows. CMG also established new writers to the screenplay development including Brian and Jason Cleveland, Larry Wilson and Richard Claus himself.

The Zelada family has a deep-rooted history with the Amazon rain forest. The Zelada brothers are acquainted living in a small village similar to the story line of Ainbo the main character of the film. They and their family lived close to the Ucayali River at Pucallpa in the Amazon Basin during the 1980s. Their childhood spent listening to the local stories greatly influenced the direction for the film Ainbo. The character Ainbo herself is inspired by the stories their mother told them while they were young and living in the Amazon rain forest.

The stories the Zelada brothers heard are demonstrative of the ancestral tales of the Amazon that have been told for thousands of years. They bare a distinct natural cosmology where talking animals coexist with humans in a symbiotic relationship. As a result, the directors channel their memory about the childhood Amazon tales they heard into the medium of cinema.

=== Distribution ===
CMG presented the film at the 2017 67th Berlin International Film Festival during February 9, 2017. At the 2018 AFM, CMG managed to appraise the film to potential buyers. In Dec 20, 2017, Tunche Films held a preview at the Imagina Film Festival of Animation in Peru hosted by the Telefónica Foundation. Ainbo was presented at the 2018 Animation! of Ventana Sur in Buenos Aires. By 2019, the film managed to be signed in distribution agreements in over 108 countries.

The final coverage of the sales include twenty-three distributors that represent over half of the world's major markets. In Berlin in 2017, sales included a TV distribution with Fox and multi-territory deals with Vietnam, Laos, Thailand (Blue Lantern), the Baltics (Best Film/Asphire) and the Middle East (Front Row). At the AFM, rights were sold to Italy (BIM Distribuzione), WW Entertainment for Benelux, Singapore's Shaw Ent, and Poland's Kino Świat. Current new distributors include China (Turbo Films), Germany (Telepool), Latin America (CDC Intl.), Commonwealth of Independent States (Volga), South Korea (First Run), Scandinavia (Cinemanse), France (Le Pacte), and Israel (Film House). Ainbo: Spirit of the Amazon is CMG's best, pre-selling animated feature since 2005 Hoodwinked – The True Story of Little Red Riding Hood.

Despite the challenges faced by the logistical issues caused by COVID-19, CMG is on schedule to release the film, slated as Peru's most ambitious animation film to theaters in 2021. Ainbo will release in different quarters of the year 2021. In the European school holidays of February, the film's major release will occur in April 22 coinciding with Earth Day. The release date is intended to raise awareness of the precious ecosystem of the Amazon rain forest.

At the 41st AFM online edition, on November 9, 2020, Ainbo: Spirit of the Amazon was presented. Cartoon Brew picked the film in one of their list of anticipated animated releases exhibited at the AFM. The film had its debut in Ukraine on 13 February 2021. In Netherlands, the movie will be released on August 1, 2021. In anticipation for the release a Dutch trailer was released on November 23, 2020. Furthermore, Storyworld, the Dutch museum for comics and animation at Groningen will host a 3D production exhibition of the film from July 10, 2021. In May 2021, the film released in Central America including Panama. The outdoor Art cinema of Rijeka festival in Croatia commenced in July 2021 hosting Ainbo: Spirit of the Amazon in the Cinema of the Childhood Home section. The film was one of the openers of the Giffoni Film Festival in Italy on 8 July 2021.

In June 2021, at the 60th Annecy International Animation Film Festival, distribution deals were announced by Signature Entertainment from UK and Rialto Distribution for Australia and New Zealand. The film has managed to hold onto the top positions in the box office including second in all of Central America, third in Ukraine and Norway and fourth in German-speaking Switzerland as well as Iceland and Vietnam. Le Pacte Distribution (fr) releases the film in France on July 14, 2021.

=== Themes ===
The script is intended as a family-friendly animated feature film that will describe the Peruvian legends and stories to a global audience. The script explores the life of Ainbo an Amazonian girl who lives in an uncharted tropical paradise of the Amazon called Candámo. The name Ainbo is based on a local Peruvian dialect for "little girl." The characters of the film are derived from the Shipibo-Conibo tribe of the Ucayali River. The script will explore the effects of deforestation and extinction on an uncharted rain forest civilization.

Peruvian Amazonia, traditional indigenous cultures and mythological storytelling are highlighted in the film. Universal elements include the negative effects of deforestation and illegal mining as Ainbo is destined to defend Candámo from loggers and greed reinforcing the themes of ecology and diversity. The writers represented the negative effects as a motif for the Amazon myth antagonist character known as the Yacuruna.

The film will be supplemented by local legends. Variety says, "Ainbo: Spirit of the Amazon will incorporate local legends, in an explosion of colors, eco-themes and mythological characters." The directors remarked the film has all the standards of a typical Hollywood animation studio film and one of the reasons why the film found appeal was the Amazon rain forest's natural heritage status.

The script will also examine the legends of the animal spirits that civilizations and Native American groups of the Americas throughout history have described as a sort of guardian in their upbringing. Animal spirits described in the film include the skinny armadillo Dillo and the heavy-set tapir Vaca. They are introduced as comic-relief characters. One of the major spirit animals highlighted is the benevolent Mother spirit of the Amazon: Turtle Motelo Mama described in lore as a giant turtle that protects the Amazon biosphere.

=== Animation ===
At EPIC Cine the animators employ various technologies such as 3D animation, digital sculpture, motion capture and VFX for the film. Sergio Zelada was the director of animation and visual effects. Students from Tunche Films founded Epic Film School were part of the animation crew. At Katuni Animation, the technical director was Bram Vermaas. Using a suite of animation tools from Autodesk Maya such as Shotgun, animBot and whisKEY, the animation studio was able to review and increase efficiency for the animation. Panel drawings for the characters, creatures and background were handled by Tunche Films while Katuni Animation handled the animation aspect for the film.

=== Music ===
The theme song for the film is "AINBO Spirit of the Amazon Movie Song." The song is composed by Carlos Eduardo, Jose Antonio and performed by Maritza Rodriguez.

== Reception ==
The film received generally positive reviews. Peter Osteried for a Swiss review at Cineman noted although the film's potential isn't fully realized, Ainbo: Spirit of the Amazon has a "little more substructure" in comparison to foreign mythology stories that are adapted by major animation studios noting it is "ambitious and honorable attempt to stand up to the big films." Cinencuentro critic Sebastián Zavala from Peru noted the film is one of the best animations of Peru while stating "there is no denying that the passion of its creators is noticeable on screen." The review noted the second half of the film was better than the first half, that "finds its own style" that features a "worthy representation of the Amazon in a good-budget animated film." The additional side characters of Vaca and Dilo give the film an "adorable and cartoonish" atmosphere.

UnificationFrance review by Isabelle Arnaud noted the film with a unique French dubbing has different cinematic layers allowing it to target any audience: "The narrative reserves plenty of twists and turns and can be enjoyed at different levels of reading. Thus, the older ones will become aware of the ecological scope and reflection on the nature of the work, while the younger ones will appreciate the main character and her adorable companions." However Olivier Bachelard, writing for the French source Abus de Ciné took issue with the film's narrative flow: "the scenario comes in the end to add many unnecessary elements that disturb the reading."

Barnevakten review at Norway by Rune H. Rasmussen noted the film's concept of the spirit world: "good spirits are important helpers in the fight." Furthermore, the film's message is "excellently suited to create reflection and dialogue around man's cutting down of the rain forest and the destruction of nature and Natural Resources." Ohga! Italian newspaper review at the "il pianeta animato" section noted the film delivers a green message that is ideal for viewing by "adults to explain to the youngest by example and education how to defend nature and the environment, which must be a priority." Falk Straub writing for Spielfilm found the film has a "metaphorical and allegorical narrative style [that] is unusual in many places."

== Awards ==
Ainbo was a finalist at the 2022 Quirino Awards for "Best Ibero-American Animation Feature Film" and "Best sound design and original music", but lost in both categories to Bob Spit - We Do Not Like People.
