= Adventures in Zambezia =

- South African theatrical release film poster
- Directed by: Wayne Thornley
- Written by: Andrew Cook; Raffaella Delle Donne; Anthony Silverston; Wayne Thornley
- Produced by: Mike Buckland; Stuart Forrest; James Middleton; Anthony Silverston
- Starring: Jeremy Suarez; Abigail Breslin; Jeff Goldblum; Leonard Nimoy; Samuel L. Jackson
- Cinematography: Wayne Thornley
- Edited by: Michel Smit; Paul Speirs; Luke MacKay
- Music by: Bruce Retief
- Production companies: Triggerfish Animation Studios; Wonderful Works; 120dB Films
- Distributed by: NuMetro Distribution (South Africa); Cinema Management Group (International)
- Release date: 3 July 2012
- Running time: 82 minutes
- Country: South Africa
- Language: English
- Budget: R173 million ($20 million)
- Box office: $34.4 million

Adventures in Zambezia, or simply Zambezia, is a 2012 South African animated adventure comedy film directed by Wayne Thornley, written by Andrew Cook, Raffaella Delle Donne, and Anthony Silverston, and stars the voices of Jeremy Suarez, Abigail Breslin, Jeff Goldblum, Leonard Nimoy, and Samuel L. Jackson, with Jim Cummings, Richard E. Grant, Jenifer Lewis, Jamal Mixon, and David Shaughnessy in supporting roles. In the film, Kai, a peregrine falcon journeys to the titular city which is in a colossal Baobab tree on the edge of Victoria Falls. Adventures in Zambezia is the first film produced by Triggerfish Animation Studios and distributed by Cinema Management Group and Sony Pictures in English territories.

Adventures in Zambezia was theatrically released on 3 July 2012 and earned $34.4 million on a R173 million budget. It received Annie Award nominations for Music in an Animated Feature Production and for Voice Acting in an Animated Feature Production. The film won the Best South African Feature Film at the Durban International Film Festival in 2012. It also won Best Animation at the South African Film and Television Awards and Best Animation at the 9th Africa Movie Academy Awards.

== Plot ==
Kai, a high-spirited young peregrine falcon on the cusp of adulthood is bored and lonely living in a remote outpost in the Katungu grassland with only his strict father, Tendai, for company. Forbidden from venturing beyond the Katungu Boundary, his suspicions that there must be more to life are confirmed when a saddle-billed stork named Gogo, her weaver bird co-pilot Tini, and recently newly hatched ducklings crash land into his nest. From them, Kai learns that downriver is a bustling bird city called Zambezia with exciting opportunities for a talented flier such as himself, where Gogo and Tini are going. During an angry exchange with his father and an encounter with marabou storks leaded by Cecil, alongside his brother Sill, and his cousin Morton who had been following Gogo and Tini on their route to Zambezia to eat eggs that Gogo and Tini were caring, Tendai accidentally kills Sill by getting him stuck on a branch and drowning him when the branch breaks in a struggle to save Kai, Gogo, and Tini. Kai discovers that Tendai has known all along about Zambezia and has been there himself even after Gogo, Tini, and the marabous recognized him. Hurt and angry at his father's lies, Kai leaves Katungu and journeys downriver. The following night, Tendai then tries to follow Kai to apologize to him, but is captured by Budzo, a rock monitor who has joined forces with the marabous to take control of Zambezia, when he stumbles upon him during Sill's funeral.

Arriving at Zambezia – a majestic Baobab perched on the edge of Victoria Falls – Kai is amazed by the throngs of birds from all over the world who are busy preparing for the annual Spring Celebrations. He soon befriends a fast-talking nightjar called Ezee who knows how to enjoy the perks of community life and guides him through the city. Kai is bowled over when he meets Zoe, a beautiful and feisty kite who is the adopted daughter of Sekhuru, Zambezia's founder and a wise old eagle. Kai doesn't make a good first impression when he accidentally ruins her Spring Celebration decorations, but is thrilled when his skillful flying earns him a place as a trainee on the Hurricanes, the elite defense patrol made up of the best fliers in Zambezia that Tendai used to be in, led by a pompous lammergeier named Ajax.

The marabous capture all of the weavers during the beginning of the Spring Celebration, including Tini, and force them to make a bridge for Budzo to cross. Kai, Ezee and Zoe try to follow the Hurricanes on a reconnaissance mission the following night, where Ezee gets his back broken and ends up in the hospital, and they almost encounter the marabous and Budzo and learn of their plan, but it results in Kai getting kicked out of the Hurricanes, but at the same time, the marabous lure the Hurricanes into a trap. Gogo takes Kai to Sekhuru, who reveals that Zambezia was his birthplace and was raised by Tendai and his late mother Amaya, who had both founded the Hurricanes, but during a mission involving a kite nest attacked by Budzo, she was eaten and therefore blinded Tendai with grief who left to Katungu to raise Kai, while the Hurricanes were only able to rescue one egg, which contained Zoe. They reveal what the marabous and Budzo are planning to Sekhuru and Gogo. In order to save Zambezia, Zoe goes to find the Hurricanes, while Kai and Gogo go to rescue Tini, the weavers, and Tendai and succeed in freeing them, but the marabous and Budzo have left to Zambezia to eat all the eggs. During this, the marabous discover Budzo has his own army of rock monitors and are betrayed by him.

Kai and Tendai confront the marabous, but Kai realize the marabous are still birds and before Budzo can reach the nursery to eat their eggs, Kai persuades the marabous to turn against Budzo and then lectures the other birds to join the fight. Zoe rescues Ajax and the rest of Hurricanes from the trap and they join the battle. Budzo easily overpowers Tendai, and corners him on a ferris wheel. The Hurricanes destroy the bridge with rocks, killing Budzo's army, while a fully healed Ezee, the other birds and the Hurricanes trap him with a net and manage to push Budzo and the wheel toward the falls as the wheel is destroyed after hitting a precipice. As Budzo falls into the waterfalls to his death, Kai follows him to save Zoe after she got snagged in the net and manages to pull up her from the falls. With the rock monitors defeated, the Zambezians celebrate with a proper Spring Celebration and the marabous are accepted into Zambezia, which pleases them.

In a mid credits scene, a baby rock monitor that Kai and Tendai were trying to catch earlier eventually reaches shore, where it is suddenly cornered by the marabous, who then unexpectedly offer it two snacks of bugs on a stick.

== Voice cast ==
- Jeremy Suarez as Kai, a peregrine falcon.
- Abigail Breslin as Zoe, a black-winged kite.
- Jeff Goldblum as Ajax, a pompous lammergeier who is the leader of the Hurricanes.
- Leonard Nimoy as Chief Sekhuru, an African fish eagle who is the elder of Zambezia and had lost one of his wings in an earlier battle.
- Samuel L. Jackson as Tendai, the founder and former member of the Hurricanes, and Kai's father.
- Jenifer Lewis as Gogo, a kooky saddle-billed stork who tells Kai about Zambezia.
- Jim Cummings as Budzo, a overweight rock monitor who seeks to invade Zambezia.
- Jamal Mixon as Ezee, a fast-talking nightjar who befriends Kai.
- Richard E. Grant as Cecil, the leader of the marabou storks.
- David Shaughnessy as Morton, a marabou stork who is Cecil's fourth cousin once removed.
- Noureen DeWulf as Pavi, an Indian accented African sacred ibis who befriends Kai.
- Tania Gunadi as Tini, a weaver bird and Gogo's friend.
- Deep Roy as Mushana, a green pigeon
- Phil LaMarr as an African grey parrot, the arrival announcer for Zambezia.
  - Phil LaMarr also voices Dodo, a guineafowl.
- Corey Burton as Neville, a Lilian's lovebird.
- Tress MacNeille as Neville's wife, a Lilian's lovebird.
- Lee Duru as Nursery Bird, a Lapwing
- Zolani Mahola as a weaver bird

Kelly Stables and Kristen Rutherford provide the voices of the Gossip Birds, a group of Guinea turacos.

Jim Cummings, Tom Kenny, Jon Olson, Brent Palmer, and Wayne Thornley provide the voices of the assorted marabou storks.

Keeno Lee Hector, Nik Rabinowitz, and Sam Riegel provided the voices of various Hurricanes.

== Release ==
Adventures in Zambezia was theatrically released on 3 July 2012 by Cinema Management Group and Sony Pictures Entertainment in English territories and was released on DVD and Blu-ray on 24 April 2013 by Sony Pictures Home Entertainment.

== Reception ==
On Rotten Tomatoes the film holds an approval rating of 25% based on 8 reviews, with an average rating of 5.2/10. Common Sense Media gave the film a 3 out of 5 stars.

== Accolades ==
The film won the Best South African Feature Film at the Durban International Film Festival in 2012. It also won Best Animation at the South African Film and Television Awards and Best Animation at the 9th Africa Movie Academy Awards.

Award	Category	Recipient	Result
Annie Awards	Music in an Animated Feature Production	Bruce Retief	Nominated
Annie Awards	Voice Acting in an Animated Feature Production	Jim Cummings	Nominated
Africa Movie Academy Awards	Best Animation	Wayne Thornley	Won

== Soundtrack ==
Adventures in Zambezia (Motion Picture Soundtrack)

Soundtrack album by Various Artists
- Released: 20 September 2013
- Recorded: 2012
- Genre: Film soundtrack
- Length: 36:19
- Label: Triggerfish
- Producer: Bruce Retief

Singles from Adventures in Zambezia (Motion Picture Soundtrack)
- 1. "Get Up"; 2. "Say Hello to Zambezia"; 3. "Out of Mist"; 4. "Easy Easy"

The original motion picture soundtrack for the film was written, composed and produced by Bruce Retief, which was released on 20 September 2013 through Triggerfish in digital download. It includes fourteen tracks, with music from Retief as the film's score composer, and studio performances from various artists, including Gang of Instrumentals, Zolani Mahola (who also provided the voice of a weaver in the film), and Ludovic Mampuya. It is available on iTunes and on Amazon.

=== Track listing ===
All music written and composed by Bruce Retief, except where noted.

No.	Title	Performer(s)	Length
1.	"Get Up"	Zolani Mahola	3:38
2.	"Bandits"		1:18
3.	"High Speed Air Chase"		1:56
4.	"The Gorge"		4:32
5.	"Cecil's Lament"		3:00
6.	"Flying to Zambezia"		3:06
7.	"Say Hello to Zambezia"	Gang of Instrumentals	2:30
8.	"Zambezia Theme Variations"		1:18
9.	"Hurricane Trials"		2:36
10.	"Lizards on Zambezia"		2:40
11.	"Fight on the Bridge"		3:04
12.	"Budzo's End"		1:12
13.	"Out of Mist"	Ludovic Mampuya	3:19
14.	"Easy Easy"	Gang of Instrumentals	2:10
Total length:			36:19
