= It Is No Dream =

2012 documentary about Theodor Herzl

- Film Poster
- Directed by: Richard Trank
- Written by: Richard Trank
- Based on: Original Material Written by: Richard Trank; Rabbi Marvin Hier
- Produced by: Rabbi Marvin Hier; Richard Trank
- Starring: Christoph Waltz
- Narrated by: Sir Ben Kingsley
- Cinematography: Jeffrey Victor
- Edited by: Nimrod Erez
- Music by: Lee Holdridge
- Production company: Moriah Films
- Distributed by: Multicom Entertainment Group
- Release date: August 10, 2012
- Running time: 97 minutes
- Country: United States
- Language: English

It Is No Dream (also known as It Is No Dream: The Life of Theodor Herzl) is a 2012 American documentary film written and directed by Richard Trank, based on original materials created by Trank and Rabbi Marvin Hier, with whom Trank co-produced the film. The film chronicles the life and struggles of famous Zionist and "spiritual father of the Jewish state" Theodor Herzl, as he abandons his comfortable life in Europe to fulfill his objective to return the Jewish people to their ancient homeland. The film discusses to great length the Anti-Semitism faced by Jews in Europe in the late 19th century and early 20th century, and how Herzl's legacy impacted the lives of the Jewish people in Israel and around the world.

== Cast ==
=== Voices ===
- Sir Ben Kingsley as Narrator
- Christoph Waltz as Theodor Herzl
- Steven Schub as David Ben-Gurion
- Matthew Asner
- Athena Demos
- Brian McArdle
- Tom Metcalfe
- Steven Schub
- Jim Wyatt

=== Interviewees ===
- Shimon Peres - the 8th Prime Minister of Israel and the 9th President of Israel
- Dr. Robert S. Wistrich - an author and historian; Nueberger Professor of European and Jewish History at the Hebrew University of Jerusalem
- Arthur Cohn - an Academy Award winning Swiss film producer and grandson of the first chief rabbi of Basel, Rabbi Arthur Cohn

== Production ==
The film was shot in Israel as well as multiple locations across Europe and the Middle East, including Austria, France, Germany, Hungary, Switzerland, Israel, and Turkey.

== Release ==
The film premiered in New York City on August 10, 2012, with an additional premiere in Los Angeles a week later.
