= Committee for Charity and Support for the Palestinians =

French-based registered charitable organization

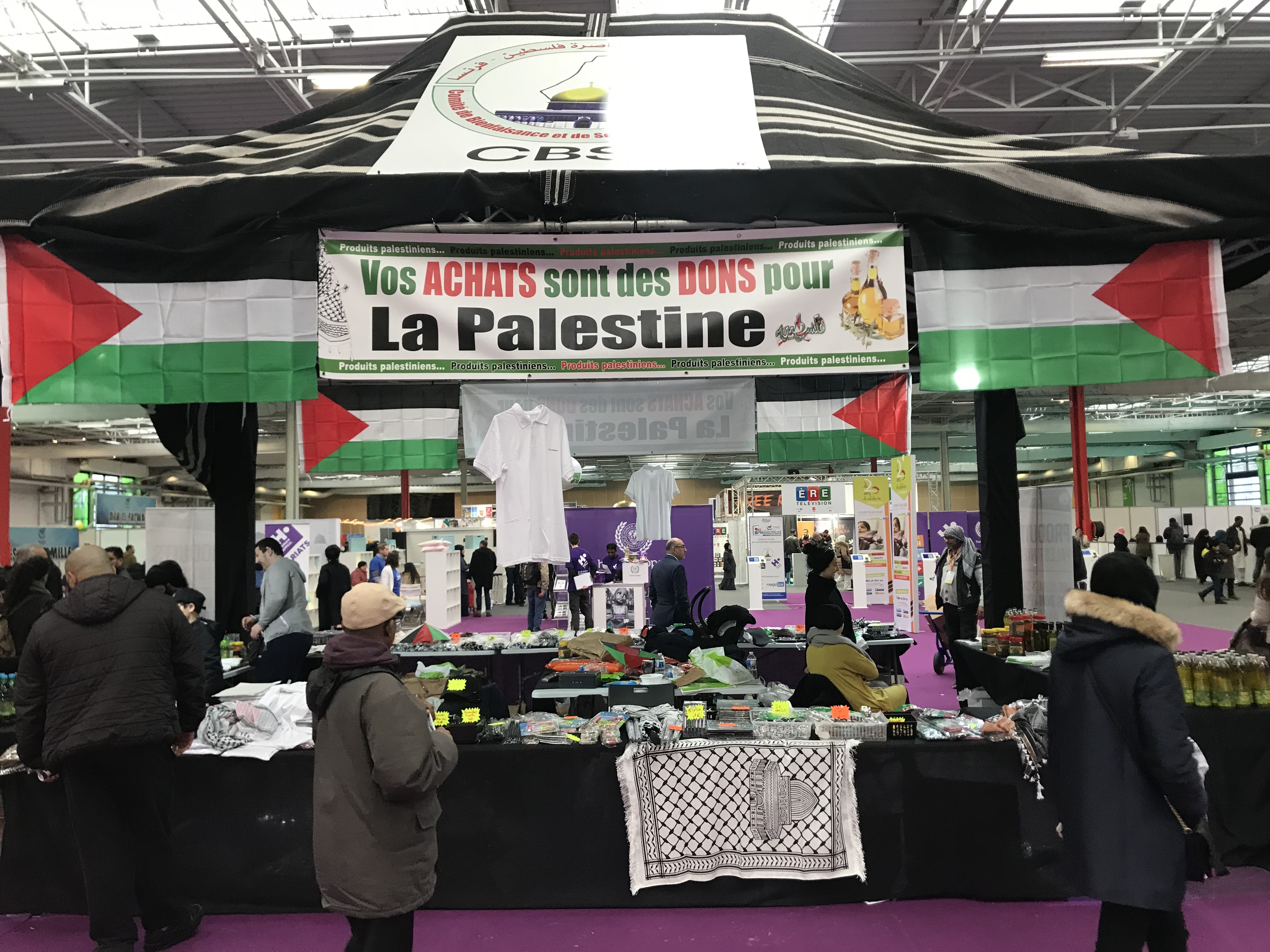
CBSP at an expo

The Committee for Charity and Support for the Palestinians (French: Comité de Bienfaisance et de Secours aux Palestiniens; CBSP) is a French-based registered charitable organization that was founded in 1990 to provide aid to vulnerable Palestinians. Its current president is Mahmood Zuheir.

The CBSP's states its humanitarian mission is to provide emergency assistance and develop sustainable economic and social programs in partnership with local organizations so as to assist the most needy segments of the Palestinian population in Gaza, the West Bank, and Palestinian refugee camps in Jordan and Lebanon.

In 2010 the organization had around 30 employees and 350 volunteers and received donations from 70,000 donors.

== Field of work and other activities ==
CBSP's states its work programme is made up of four focus areas:

- Palestinian orphans and the disabled; providing support that includes scholarships for education and winter clothing.
- Needy families; providing support including food aid and emergency medical aid.
- Health care; providing support that includes hospital renovations and construction, the provision of medications and medical supplies, and salary support for health care workers.
- Sustainable development; work in this field ranges from assisting disabled individuals in finding permanent employment, building housing and water infrastructures, and supporting Palestinian farmers.

Seven members of the group participated in the Gaza Freedom Flotilla in 2010.

== Accusations of terrorism financing ==
In August 2003, the CBSP was listed by the United States Treasury as a terrorist funding organization, also under the allegation that the organization fundraised for Hamas. In November 2003, Australia announced it had frozen the assets of six leaders of Hamas, along with those of a number of charitable institutions - one of which was the CBSP. Spokesperson Youcef Benderbal of the CBSP denied the allegations, stating that "Everyone, especially the French authorities, knows that our efforts and donations are solely directed to charities with a defined aim of supporting the orphans and establishing development projects to benefit them."

=== Legal proceedings ===
CBSP has been involved in legal proceedings against groups accusing them of financing terrorism. In 2006, CBSPs bank Crédit Lyonnais were sued by a group of Americans who claimed that the bank knowingly allowed money to be funneled to Hamas via its accounts. In 2007, the Israel-friendly Simon Wiesenthal Center accused CBSP of funding families of suicide bombers and the CBSP countered with a defamation suit. In 2010, CBSP was again accused of financing terrorism by the French Jewish umbrella organization CRIF and the group again countered with a defamation suit.

==== Strauss v. Credit Lyonnais ====
In 2006, thirteen Americans led by Moses Strauss who had sustained injuries from terrorist attacks in Israel, filed a lawsuit in a District Court in Brooklyn against the French-based bank Crédit Lyonnais under the Anti-Terrorism Act of 1992.

They claimed that the bank knowingly allowed funds to be funnelled to Hamas by failing to quickly close bank accounts for the CBSP. Crédit Lyonnais claimed to have closed the accounts in September 2003, three years after it first noticed "unusual activity" in the account in question.

The suit alleges that "the financial services that the defendant knowingly provided to Hamas by collecting and transmitting funds on behalf of Hamas (with the knowledge that CBSP raises funds for Hamas) assists Hamas in its recruiting, rewarding, and providing incentives to suicide bombers and other terrorists."

The case has not yet been settled and is currently being processed in the United States Court of Appeals for the Second Circuit.

==== Wiesenthal case ====
The head of international relations for the Simon Wiesenthal Center, Stanley Trevor (Shimon) Samuels, also accused the CBSP of funding families of suicide bombers. In response, the CBSP filed a defamation suit in a Paris court, calling the accusations "ridiculous", and stating that its charitable work consisted of providing aid to some 3,000 Palestinian orphans.

On March 8, 2007, the court ruled that documents produced by the Wiesenthal Center established no "direct or indirect participation in financing terrorism" on the part of the CBSP, characterizing the allegations as "seriously defamatory." Samuel was handed a suspended fine of 1,000 euros (1,300 dollars) and ordered to pay one euro in symbolic damages to the Palestinian support group

The Center appealed the court ruling, and won its case on appeal before the Paris Court of Appeal in October 2008. The court ruled that there was nothing defamatory in the centre's allegations against the CBSP.

==== CRIF case ====
In 2010 Marc Knobel, a researcher of the Jewish-French umbrella organization Conseil Représentatif des Institutions juives de France (CRIF) published an article on the organization's web site claiming that the CBSP was raising money for Hamas. CBSP responded by suing Knobel for defamation. In 2012, a lower court whose ruling was appealed fined Knobel and CRIF's webmaster $2,070 each for defaming CBSP. In 2014 an appeals court reaffirmed the ruling by the lower court.

The courts ruled that Knobel's article was defamatory because CRIF had failed to present evidence supporting its allegation that CBSP funded Hamas.
