= Arnold Schwartzman =

British designer, author and film director

Arnold Martin Schwartzman OBE RDI is a British designer, author, and film director who in 1982 won an Oscar for Best Documentary Feature, for his film of the reminiscences of Holocaust survivors titled Genocide.

== Early life and family ==
Arnold Schwartzman was born in east London in 1936. His family moved to Margate, Kent when he was nine years old, where his parents ran the Majestic Hotel in Cliftonville. Schwartzman's first job in the movie industry was in Margate, as the assistant projectionist at the Cameo cinema. He studied at Canterbury College of Art, now University for the Creative Arts. He is married to Isolde.

== Career ==
Schwartzman's early career was in British television.

In 1982, he won an Oscar for Best Documentary Feature, for Genocide. His other films are Liberation (1994) and Echoes That Remain (1991). He has designed advertisements for the Oscars for several years.

In 1982 he was appointed the director of design for the Los Angeles Olympic Games. He later designed posters for four consecutive Academy Awards presentations from 1997 to 2000; the 69th, 70th, 71st, and 72nd Academy Awards.

== Honours ==
Schwartzman was appointed a member of the Order of the British Empire (OBE) in 2002. In 2006 he was elected a Royal Designer for Industry (RDI). He was made an Honorary Freeman of Margate, his hometown, in September 2023, with his colleague Sir Ben Kingsley attending the ceremony to pay tribute to Schwartzman's career.

== Selected publications ==
- Phono-Graphics: The visual paraphernalia of the talking machine. Chronicle Books, 1993. ISBN 9780811803021
- Designage: The art of the decorative sign. Chronicle Books, 1999. ISBN 9780811819626
- A Persistence of Vision: Arnold Schwartzman profiles His Work in Graphic Design and Film. Images Publishing Group, 2005. ISBN 9781864701210
- London Art Deco. Hudson Hills Press, Manchester, Vermont, 2006. ISBN 9781555952822
- Art Deco City: The world's most beautiful buildings. Palazzo Editions, 2018. ISBN 9781786750419
- Arts and Crafts: From William Morris to Frank Lloyd Wright. Palazzo Editions, 2021. ISBN 9781786750655
