= Midstream (magazine) =

American Zionist magazine (1955–2013)

- Frequency: Monthly
- Publisher: Theodor Herzl Foundation
- Founded: 1955
- Country: United States
- Based in: New York City
- Website: midstreamthf.com
- ISSN: 0026-332X

Midstream was a magazine established by the New York-based Theodor Herzl Foundation, which was associated with the American Section of the World Zionist Organization. Described as an "intellectual Zionist journal". It to a significant degree saw itself as playing a role somewhat similar to that of Commentary, an intellectual publication of the American Jewish Committee, but with an explicitly Jewish focus. Midstream began publication in 1955. Started as a Quarterly Jewish Review, it became a monthly in 1965. Its final print edition was in 2013.

Midstream was a journal of opinion, focusing on political, social and religious topics related to Jewish communities. While it was not the official organ per se of the Foundation, it was established, at a time when a range of similar publications were being printed, such as Partisan Review, The Reconstructionist, and even The New Republic, as a means for expression of a wide range of opinions within political Zionism, not necessarily reflecting the views of the magazine's editors.

Midstream to a significant degree followed the basic political arc of Commentary from liberal to center-of-the-road to somewhat conservative to neoconservative, reflecting the views of a succession of editors, although it was not the same arc of the majority of American Jewry.
