= Marvin Hier =

American rabbi, film producer, and non-profit executive

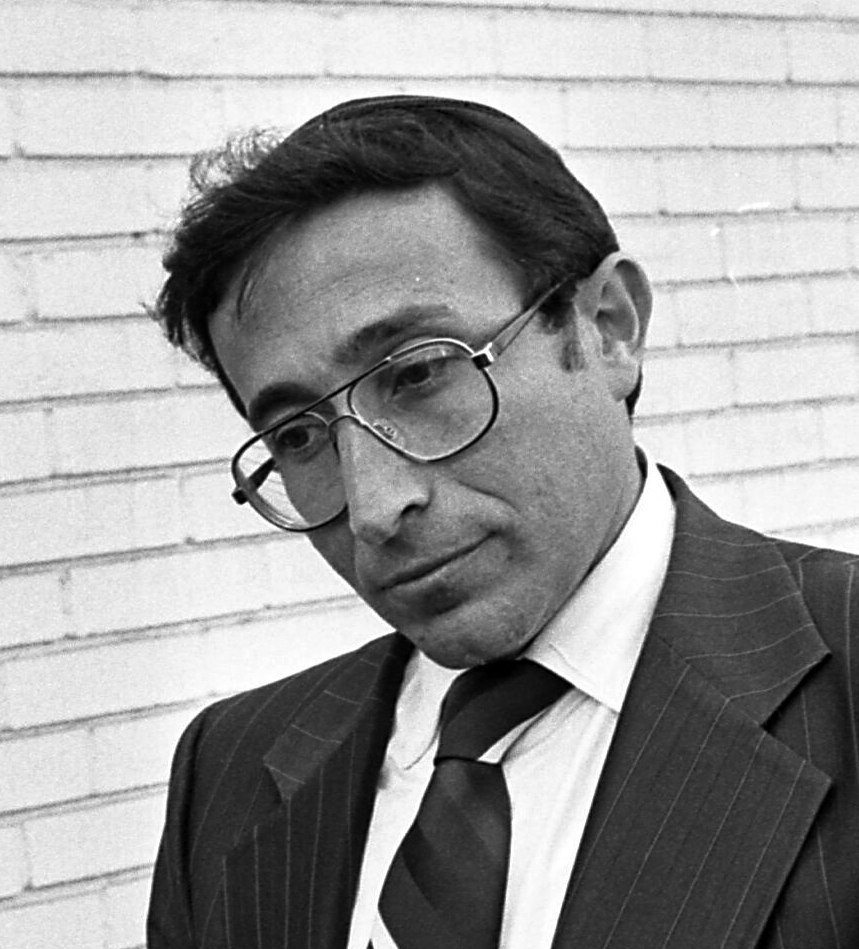
- Hier in 1981
- Born: 1939 (age 86–87); New York City, U.S.
- Occupation: Rabbi
- Children: 2 sons

Marvin (Moshe Chaim) Hier (born 1939 in New York City) is the dean and founder of the Simon Wiesenthal Center, its Museum of Tolerance and of Moriah, the center's film division. He has been a Track II diplomacy contributor to the genesis of the Abraham Accords.

== Early life ==
Hier was born in 1939 in New York City. His Jewish parents came from Poland; his father worked as a lamp polisher after arriving in New York in 1917. Hier grew up on the Lower East Side attending the Rabbi Shlomo Kluger Yeshiva on Houston Street for elementary school and the Rabbi Jacob Joseph School for high-school and six years post-high school. Hier received smicha in 1962 from Rabbi Mendel Kravitz, rosh yeshiva of the Rabbi Jacob Joseph School.

== Career ==
In the 1960s, Hier served as assistant rabbi and, in 1964, became Rabbi of Congregation Schara Tzedeck in Vancouver, British Columbia. In 1977, following a visit to Holocaust sites in Europe, Hier came to Los Angeles to create the Simon Wiesenthal Center. Under his leadership, the center has become one of the foremost Jewish human rights agencies in the world, with a constituency of more than 400,000 families. The center maintains offices throughout the United States, and in Canada, Europe, Israel and Argentina.

Hier is the recipient of two Academy Awards—as co-producer and co-writer for the 1981 documentary Genocide, about the Holocaust, and as co-producer of the 1997 documentary The Long Way Home, which offers new insights into the critical post World War II period between 1945 and 1948 and the suffering of the tens of thousands of refugees who survived the Holocaust.

In 1990, he wrote and co-produced the award-winning Echoes That Remain, a documentary on pre-World War II European Jewish life, and in 1994, Hier produced and co-wrote, Liberation, the first production of Moriah Films. Under Hier's direction, the Wiesenthal Center has served as consultant to Steven Spielberg's epic Schindler's List, and ABC Television's miniseries adaptation of Herman Wouk's novel, War and Remembrance. He is the recipient of an honorary degree and, in 1993 was made a Chevalier in the Ordre National du Mérite by French President François Mitterrand.

Newsweek describes Hier as the following, "Hier is one phone call away from almost every world leader, journalist and Hollywood studio head. He is the dean and founder of the Simon Wiesenthal Center, the Museum of Tolerance and Moriah Films." In 2007 and 2008 Marvin Hier was named the most influential rabbi in America by Newsweek.

Hier founded the Yeshiva University High Schools of Los Angeles and was the dean of the school until the 2006–2007 school year.

Hier helped to propagate the 2006 Iranian sumptuary law hoax, declaring the fictitious law to be "absolutely true" when contacted by Canadian journalist Douglas Kelly to verify the story.

President George W. Bush appointed Hier to serve on the honorary delegation to accompany him to Jerusalem for the celebration of the 60th anniversary of the State of Israel in May 2008.

In 2009, he criticized Vatican cardinal Renato Martino over his comment that the Gaza Strip was a "big concentration camp". He later criticized the lifting of the excommunication of bishop Richard Williamson, a member of the Society of Saint Pius X.

In 2009 Newsweek named him # 2 on its list of "50 Influential Rabbis."

A $100 million Museum of Tolerance and Human Dignity, a project of the Simon Wiesenthal Center in Los Angeles run by Marvin Hier, is set to be built in Jerusalem, Israel.

In 2013, The Forward called Hier the "most overpaid" executive of a Jewish non-profit. Hier's family received nearly $1.3 million in 2012 from the Simon Wiesenthal Center.

Heir gave an invocation at the 2017 inauguration of Donald Trump. He was "the first Orthodox rabbi ever to give a benediction at an American president's inauguration". He cited Psalm 137: "By the rivers of Babylon ... We wept as we remembered Zion. If I forget thee, Oh Jerusalem, may my right hand forget its skill." He then participated in fundraising events for Trump's 2020 reelection.

In 2017 Heir was honored as a torchbearer in the national Israeli Independence Day ceremony. Later that year Hier welcomed the King of Bahrain Hamad bin Isa Al Khalifa at the Simon Wiesenthal Center in Los Angeles together with Rabbi Abraham Cooper, paving the way for the Abraham Accords.

In 2019 Marvin attended the Peace to Prosperity conference in Bahrain. During the June 25–26 economic conference in Manama, Hier praised the government of Bahrain saying, "If every Arab country were to be like Bahrain, the Messiah would arrive!"

== Personal life ==
Hier resides in Los Angeles, California. He has two sons and eight grandchildren.

== See also ==
- History of the Jews in Los Angeles
