= Genocide (1981 film) =

1982 film by Arnold Schwartzman

- Directed by: Arnold Schwartzman
- Written by: Martin Gilbert; Marvin Hier; Arnold Schwartzman
- Produced by: Rabbi Marvin Hier; Arnold Schwartzman
- Narrated by: Elizabeth Taylor; Orson Welles
- Cinematography: Peter Shillingford
- Edited by: Bob Jenkis
- Music by: Elmer Bernstein
- Production company: Moriah Films
- Distributed by: United Artists Classics (United States and Canada); Manson International (International)
- Release date: 1981
- Running time: 90 minutes
- Country: United States
- Language: English

Genocide is a 1981 American documentary by Arnold Schwartzman.

== Summary ==
The film documents the history of the Holocaust and the reminiscences of those who survived it in support of the fact that, as one of the survivors stated, it can happen again with the rise of anti-Semitism.

== Reception and legacy ==
Michael Berenbaum, project director of the United States Holocaust Memorial Museum described the movie as "a substantive piece of work" but "watching it is like sitting in a dentist's chair where the drill begins at the first moment and doesn't let up till the end of the two hours. If it had, it might have been more effective. In a real sense, that is Marvin Hier."

It won the Academy Award for Best Documentary Feature, the first Holocaust film to win such an honor.

== See also ==
- 1981 in film
- List of Holocaust films
