= The Long Way Home (1997 film) =

- Directed by: Mark Jonathan Harris
- Produced by: Richard Trank; Rabbi Marvin Hier
- Narrated by: Morgan Freeman
- Cinematography: Don Lenzer
- Edited by: Kate Amend
- Music by: Lee Holdridge
- Production company: Moriah Films
- Distributed by: Seventh Art Releasing
- Release date: September 19, 1997
- Running time: 120 minutes
- Country: United States
- Language: English

The Long Way Home is a 1997 American documentary film directed by Mark Jonathan Harris. It depicts the plight of Jewish refugees after World War II that contributed to the creation of the State of Israel.

== Summary ==
The film's emphasis is on the pitiful conditions for Jewish refugees in Europe after the war, as antisemitism was still rife and poverty was common. It also shows how emigration to the British Mandate of Palestine became a goal for many, but that British immigration rules often resulted in them being detained in camps in Cyprus. The eventual formation of the State of Israel is then shown, with emphasis on the debates in the White House between Palestinian Jews, President Harry S. Truman, and the United Nations.

== Production ==
The Long Way Home is narrated by Morgan Freeman and features the voices of Edward Asner, Sean Astin, Martin Landau, Miriam Margolyes, David Paymer, Nina Siemaszko, Helen Slater, and Michael York.

== Reception ==
On review aggregator website Rotten Tomatoes, the film holds an approval rating of 100% based on 5 reviews, with an average rating of 8.4/10.

== Accolades ==
The film won the Academy Award for Best Documentary Feature in 1998.

== See also ==
- List of Holocaust films
