= List of songs recorded by the Chemical Brothers =

This is a list of released songs and instrumentals by British electronic duo the Chemical Brothers. There are 195 singles and 7 mix album tracks. The duo have 11 studio albums (one of these a soundtrack) between 1995 and 2023. They have also done multiple mix albums, 31 singles, 4 DVDs, multiple remixes, 6 compilation albums and 6 EPs. The list does not include remixes or alternate versions, except in the case of "Hanna's Theme" and the edits of the Electronic Battle Weapon promo singles.

== Singles ==
#	Title	Length	Year	Publication	Featuring and/or Vocals By
1	"Song to the Siren"	4:49	1992	"Song to the Siren", Exit Planet Dust, Singles 93–03	
2	"Chemical Beats"	5:41	1994	Fourteenth Century Sky, Exit Planet Dust, Singles 93–03, Brotherhood	
3	"One Too Many Mornings"	4:17	1994	Fourteenth Century Sky, Exit Planet Dust	
4	"Dope Coil"	5:05	1994	Fourteenth Century Sky	
5	"Her Jazz"	8:40	1994	Fourteenth Century Sky	
6	"My Mercury Mouth"	5:55	1994	My Mercury Mouth E.P	
7	"If You Kling to Me I'll Klong You"	5:26	1994	My Mercury Mouth E.P, "Life Is Sweet", Singles 93–03	
8	"Dust-Up Beats"	6:35	1994	My Mercury Mouth E.P	
9	"Leave Home"	5:33	1995	"Leave Home", Exit Planet Dust, "Life Is Sweet", Singles 93–03, Brotherhood	
10	"Let Me In Mate"	4:21	1995	"Leave Home", B-Sides Volume 1	
11	"In Dust We Trust"	5:17	1995	Exit Planet Dust	
12	"Three Little Birdies Down Beats"	5:36	1995	Exit Planet Dust	
13	"Fuck Up Beats"	1:21	1995	Exit Planet Dust	
14	"Chico's Groove"	4:48	1995	Exit Planet Dust, "Life Is Sweet"	
15	"Life Is Sweet"	6:33	1995	Exit Planet Dust, "Life Is Sweet"	Tim Burgess
16	"Playground for a Wedgless Firm"	2:31	1995	Exit Planet Dust	
17	"Alive Alone"	5:16	1995	Exit Planet Dust	Beth Orton
18	"Time for Livin'"	4:13	1995	The Help Album	
19	"Loops of Fury"	4:40	1996	Loops of Fury, "Setting Sun", Singles 93–03	
20	"(The Best Part of) Breaking Up"	5:44	1996	Loops of Fury	
21	"Get Up on It Like This"	6:05	1996	Loops of Fury, Live at the Social Volume 1, Dig Your Own Hole	
22	"Introduction"	0:36	1996	Live at the Social Volume 1	
23	"Electronic Battle Weapon 1"	6:39	1996	"Electronic Battle Weapon 1"/"2", Brotherhood	
24	"Electronic Battle Weapon 2"	7:15	1996	"Electronic Battle Weapon 1"/"2", "Elektrobank", Brotherhood	
25	"Setting Sun"	5:29	1996	"Setting Sun", Dig Your Own Hole, "The Private Psychedelic Reel", Singles 93–03, Brotherhood	Noel Gallagher
26	"Buzz Tracks"	4:11	1996	"Setting Sun"	
27	"Where Do I Begin"	6:56	1997	"Where Do I Begin", Dig Your Own Hole	Beth Orton
28	"Block Rockin' Beats"	5:13	1997	"Block Rockin' Beats", Dig Your Own Hole, Singles 93–03, Brotherhood, The Chemical Brothers	
29	"Prescription Beats"	5:13	1997	"Block Rockin' Beats", Only 4 the K People, B-Sides Volume 1	
30	"Morning Lemon"	4:36	1997	"Block Rockin' Beats", Singles 93–03	
31	"Dig Your Own Hole"	5:27	1997	Dig Your Own Hole	
32	"Elektrobank"	8:18	1997	Dig Your Own Hole, "Elektrobank"	Kool Herc
33	"Piku"	4:54	1997	Dig Your Own Hole, The Chemical Brothers	
34	"It Doesn't Matter"	6:16	1997	Dig Your Own Hole	
35	"Don't Stop the Rock"	4:48	1997	Dig Your Own Hole	
36	"Lost in the K-Hole"	3:51	1997	Dig Your Own Hole	
37	"The Private Psychedelic Reel"	9:21	1997	Dig Your Own Hole, "The Private Psychedelic Reel", Singles 93–03	
38	"Not Another Drugstore"	5:31	1997	"Elektrobank", Brothers Gonna Work It Out, Singles 93–03	Justin Warfield
39	"These Beats are Made for Breakin'"	2:48	1997	"Elektrobank"	
40	"Electronic Battle Weapon 3"	5:05	1998	"Electronic Battle Weapon 3"/"4", Brotherhood	
41	"Electronic Battle Weapon 4" ("Freak of the Week")	6:11	1998	"Electronic Battle Weapon 3"/"4", "Music: Response", Brotherhood	
42	"Hey Boy Hey Girl"	4:50	1999	"Hey Boy Hey Girl", Radio 1 Anti-Nazi Mix, Surrender, Singles 93–03, Brotherhood	
43	"Flashback"	5:20	1999	"Hey Boy Hey Girl"	
44	"Scale"	3:43	1999	"Hey Boy Hey Girl"	
45	"Music: Response"	5:09	1999	Surrender, "Music: Response"	
46	"Under the Influence"	4:16	1999	Surrender, Singles 93–03	
47	"Out of Control"	7:19	1999	Surrender, "Out of Control", Singles 93–03, Brotherhood	Bernard Sumner, Bobby Gillespie
48	"Orange Wedge"	3:06	1999	Surrender	
49	"Let Forever Be"	3:56	1999	Surrender, "Let Forever Be", Singles 93–03, Brotherhood	Noel Gallagher
50	"The Sunshine Underground"	8:38	1999	Surrender	
51	"Asleep from Day"	4:47	1999	Surrender, "Music: Response"	Hope Sandoval
52	"Got Glint?"	5:26	1999	Surrender, The Chemical Brothers	
53	"Surrender"	4:30	1999	Surrender	
54	"Dream On"	6:46	1999	Surrender	Jonathan Donahue
55	"The Diamond Sky"	3:37	1999	"Let Forever Be"	
56	"Studio K"	5:48	1999	"Let Forever Be"	
57	"Power Move"	4:11	1999	Surrender	
58	"Enjoyed"	8:09	2000	"Music: Response"	
59	"Piku Playground"	4:56	2000	"Music: Response", Singles 93–03	
60	"Electronic Battle Weapon 5"	9:50	2001	"Electronic Battle Weapon 5", "It Began in Afrika", Brotherhood	
61	"Galaxy Bounce"	4:45	2001	Lara Croft: Tomb Raider, Come with Us, Singles 93–03	
62	"It Began in Afrika"	8:38	2001	"It Began in Afrika", Come with Us	
63	"Hot Acid Rhythm 1"	5:04	2001	"It Began in Afrika"	
64	"Star Guitar"	6:27	2002	"Star Guitar", Come with Us, Come with Us/Japan Only EP, AmericanEP, Singles 93–03, Brotherhood, The Chemical Brothers	Beverley Skeete
65	"Base 6"	6:34	2002	"Star Guitar", In Glint	
66	"Come With Us"	4:58	2002	Come with Us, "Come With Us/The Test", Come with Us/Japan Only EP, AmericanEP	
67	"Hoops"	6:32	2002	Come with Us	
68	"My Elastic Eye"	3:42	2002	Come with Us	
69	"The State We're In"	6:27	2002	Come with Us	Beth Orton
70	"Denmark"	5:07	2002	Come with Us	
71	"Pioneer Skies"	4:05	2002	Come with Us	
72	"The Test"	7:46	2002	Come with Us	Richard Ashcroft
73	"H.I.A."	7:10	2002	"Come With Us/The Test", Come with Us/Japan Only EP, AmericanEP	
74	"Electronic Battle Weapon 6"	10:41	2002	"Electronic Battle Weapon 6", AmericanEP, "Get Yourself High"	
75	"Temptation/Star Guitar"	8:55	2002	Come with Us/Japan Only EP, AmericanEP	
76	"Otter Rock"	4:08	2003	The Big Noise, Singles 93–03	
77	"The Golden Path"	4:49	2003	"The Golden Path", Singles 93–03, Brotherhood	The Flaming Lips
78	"Nude Night"	6:16	2003	"The Golden Path"	
79	"Get Yourself High"	5:48	2003	Singles 93–03, "Get Yourself High"	K-OS
80	"The Duke"	5:38	2003	Singles 93–03	
81	"Delik"	5:29	2003	Singles 93–03	Tim Burgess
82	"Electronic Battle Weapon 7"	7:27	2004	"Electronic Battle Weapon 7", "Galvanize", Brotherhood	
83	"Galvanize"	6:33	2005	"Galvanize", Push the Button, Brotherhood, The Chemical Brothers	Q-Tip
84	"Rize Up"	4:08	2005	"Galvanize", B-Sides Volume 1	
85	"The Boxer"	4:08	2005	Push the Button, "The Boxer"	Tim Burgess
86	"Believe"	7:01	2005	Push the Button, "Believe", Brotherhood	Kele Okereke
87	"Hold Tight London"	6:00	2005	Push the Button	Anna-Lynne Williams
88	"Come Inside"	4:47	2005	Push the Button	
89	"The Big Jump"	4:43	2005	Push the Button	
90	"Left Right"	4:14	2005	Push the Button	Anwar Superstar
91	"Close Your Eyes"	6:13	2005	Push the Button, The Chemical Brothers	The Magic Numbers
92	"Shake Break Bounce"	3:44	2005	Push the Button	
93	"Marvo Ging"	5:28	2005	Push the Button	
94	"Surface to Air"	7:23	2005	Push the Button, The Chemical Brothers	
95	"Giant"	4:33	2005	"Believe", "The Boxer"	
96	"Spring"	5:30	2005	"Believe", "The Boxer"	
97	"Swiper"	6:13	2005	"The Boxer"	
98	"Electronic Battle Weapon 8"	6:31	2006	"Electronic Battle Weapon 8"/"9", "The Salmon Dance", Brotherhood	
99	"Electronic Battle Weapon 9"	6:41	2006	"Electronic Battle Weapon 8"/"9", Brotherhood	
100	"Do It Again"	5:33	2007	"Do It Again", We Are the Night, Brotherhood	Ali Love
101	"No Need"	5:15	2007	"Do It Again"	
102	"Clip Kiss"	6:59	2007	"Do It Again"	
103	"No Path to Follow"	1:04	2007	We Are the Night	Willy Mason
104	"We Are the Night"	6:33	2007	We Are the Night	
105	"All Rights Reversed"	4:42	2007	We Are the Night, Brotherhood	Klaxons
106	"Saturate"	4:49	2007	We Are the Night, Brotherhood, The Chemical Brothers	
107	"Das Spiegel"	5:51	2007	We Are the Night	
108	"The Salmon Dance"	3:42	2007	We Are the Night, "The Salmon Dance", The Chemical Brothers	Fatlip
109	"Burst Generator"	6:51	2007	We Are the Night	
110	"A Modern Midnight Conversation"	5:56	2007	We Are the Night	
111	"Battle Scars"	5:50	2007	We Are the Night, "Battle Scars"	Willy Mason
112	"Harpoons"	2:25	2007	We Are the Night	
113	"The Pills Won't Help You Now"	6:35	2007	We Are the Night, The Chemical Brothers	Tim Smith
114	"Seal"	4:40	2007	We Are the Night (bonus)	
115	"The Rock Drill"	5:09	2007	We Are the Night (bonus)	
116	"Snooprah"	7:15	2007	"The Salmon Dance", B-Sides Volume 1	
117	"Silver Drizzle"	6:25	2007	B-Sides Volume 1	
118	"Electronic Battle Weapon 10"	8:15	2007	"Electronic Battle Weapon 10", Brotherhood	
119	"Midnight Madness"	3:35	2008	"Midnight Madness", Brotherhood	
120	"Keep My Composure"	5:43	2008	Brotherhood	Spank Rock
121	"Escape Velocity"	11:57	2010	"Escape Velocity", Further	
122	"Swoon"	6:05	2010	"Swoon", The Chemical Brothers, Further	
123	"Snow"	5:07	2010	Further	Stephanie Dosen
124	"Another World"	5:40	2010	Further, "Another World"	Stephanie Dosen
125	"Dissolve"	6:21	2010	Further	
126	"Horse Power"	5:51	2010	Further	
127	"K+D+B"	5:39	2010	Further	Stephanie Dosen
128	"Wonders of the Deep"	5:12	2010	Further	
129	"Don't Think"	7:44	2010	Further (bonus)	
130	"Pourquoi"	6:02	2010	Further (bonus)	
131	"Hanna's Theme"	2:08	2011	Hanna	
132	"Escape 700"	5:16	2011	Hanna	
133	"Chalice 1"	0:47	2011	Hanna	
134	"The Devil is in the Details"	3:22	2011	Hanna	
135	"Map Sounds / Chalice 2"	0:15	2011	Hanna	
136	"The Forest"	1:07	2011	Hanna	
137	"Quayside Synthesis"	1:21	2011	Hanna	
138	"The Sandman"	1:45	2011	Hanna	
139	"Marissa Flashback"	2:44	2011	Hanna	
140	"Bahnof Rumble"	2:37	2011	Hanna	
141	"The Devil is in the Beats"	2:34	2011	Hanna	
142	"Car Chase (Arp Worship)"	4:58	2011	Hanna	
143	"Interreogration / Lonesome Subway / Grimm's House"	4:25	2011	Hanna	
144	"Hanna vs Marissa"	1:46	2011	Hanna	
145	"Sun Collapse"	0:11	2011	Hanna	
146	"Special Ops"	1:28	2011	Hanna	
147	"Escape Wavefold"	3:21	2011	Hanna	
148	"Isolated Howl"	0:41	2011	Hanna	
149	"Container Park"	3:45	2011	Hanna, "Container Park"	
150	"Hanna's Theme (Vocal Version)"	5:28	2011	Hanna	Stephanie Dosen
151	"Superflash"	9:52	2012	Don't Think	
152	"Theme for Velodrome"	6:29	2012	"Theme for Velodrome"	
153	"This Is Not A Game"	3:15	2014	The Hunger Games: Mockingjay, Part 1 – Original Motion Picture Soundtrack	
154	"Electronic Battle Weapon 11"	5:38	2015	"Electronic Battle Weapon 11"	Daniel Pearce
155	"Sometimes I Feel So Deserted"	5:11	2015	Born in the Echoes, Electronic Battle Weapon 11	Daniel Pearce
156	"Go"	4:20	2015	Born in the Echoes	Q-Tip, Yolanda Quartey
157	"Under Neon Lights"	4:26	2015	Born in the Echoes	St. Vincent
158	"EML Ritual"	5:20	2015	Born in the Echoes	Ali Love
159	"I'll See You There"	4:20	2015	Born in the Echoes	
160	"Just Bang"	5:21	2015	Born in the Echoes	
161	"Reflexion"	6:29	2015	Born in the Echoes	
162	"Taste of Honey"	2:59	2015	Born in the Echoes	Chenai Zinyuku, Stephanie Dosen
163	"Born in the Echoes"	3:26	2015	Born in the Echoes	Cate Le Bon
164	"Radiate"	4:39	2015	Born in the Echoes	Alela Diane
165	"Wide Open"	5:54	2015	Born in the Echoes	Beck
166	"Let Us Build a City"	4:34	2015	Born in the Echoes (bonus)	
167	"Wo Ha"	4:30	2015	Born in the Echoes (bonus)	
168	"C-H-E-M-I-C-A-L"	6:14	2016	Non-album single	Justin Warfield
169	"I Never Asked to Be Your Mountain"	3:40	2018	Non-album single	Beth Orton
170	"Free Yourself"	5:03	2018	No Geography	
171	"MAH"	5:36	2019	No Geography	
172	"Got to Keep On"	5:16	2019	No Geography	
173	"We've Got to Try"	3:35	2019	No Geography	
174	"Eve of Destruction"	4:40	2019	No Geography	AURORA
175	"Bango"	4:07	2019	No Geography	AURORA
176	"No Geography"	3:09	2019	No Geography	
177	"Gravity Drops"	4:30	2019	No Geography	
178	"The Universe Sent Me"	6:03	2019	No Geography	AURORA
179	"Catch Me I'm Falling"	5:28	2019	No Geography	AURORA
180	"Fantai"	6:48	2019	No Geography (bonus)	
181	"Eve of Dubstruction"	7:10	2019	"Eve of Dubstruction"	AURORA
182	"The Darkness That You Fear"	6:06	2021	Non-album single	
183	"Work Energy Principle"	8:53	2021	Non-album single	
184	"No Reason"	4:52	2023	For That Beautiful Feeling	
185	"All of a Sudden"	5:30	2023	No Reason (B-Side)	
186	"Live Again"	5:10	2023	For That Beautiful Feeling	Halo Maud
187	"Intro"	1:09	2023	For That Beautiful Feeling	
188	"Goodbye"	5:50	2023	For That Beautiful Feeling	
189	"Fountains"	3:45	2023	For That Beautiful Feeling	
190	"Magic Wand"	2:27	2023	For That Beautiful Feeling	
191	"The Weight"	3:43	2023	For That Beautiful Feeling	
192	"Skipping Like a Stone"	4:41	2023	For That Beautiful Feeling	Beck
193	"The Darkness That You Fear (Harvest Mix)"	3:44	2023	For That Beautiful Feeling	
194	"Feels Like I am Dreaming"	6:58	2023	For That Beautiful Feeling	
195	"For That Beautiful Feeling"	4:14	2023	For That Beautiful Feeling	Halo Maud

== Mix album tracks ==
#	Title	Length	Publication	Year
1	"Radio 1 Anti-Nazi Mix"	57:38	Radio 1 Anti-Nazi Mix	1997
2	"Brothers Gonna Work It Out"/"Not Another Drugstore"/"Block Rockin' Beats" (The Micronauts Mix)/"This Ain't Chicago"/"It's Just Begun"	10:53	Brothers Gonna Work It Out	1998
3	"Makin' a Livin'"/"Hot Wheels the Chase"/"The Theme" (Unique Mix)/"Gimee Some Love"	9:13	Brothers Gonna Work It Out	1998
4	"The Jazz"/"Sidewinder"/"Doin' It After Dark (D-Ski's Dance)"/"Dont Stop the Rock"/"To a Rockin' Nation"	15:37	Brothers Gonna Work It Out	1998
5	"Morning Lemon"/"Mars Needs Women"/"Thunder"/"Losing Control"/"Mother Earth"	14:51	Brothers Gonna Work It Out	1998
6	"The Riot"/"Trip Harder"/"Everything Must Go" (The Chemical Brothers Remix)/"I Think I'm in Love" (The Chemical Brothers Vocal Remix)	18:21	Brothers Gonna Work It Out	1998
7	"In Glint"	60:04	In Glint	2002
