= Singles 93–03 =

Greatest hits album by The Chemical Brothers
- Released: 22 September 2003
- Recorded: 1992–2003
- Genre: Big beat; electronica; trip hop; house
- Length: 71:22
- Label: Virgin; Freestyle Dust
- Producer: The Chemical Brothers

The Chemical Brothers chronology
Come with Us (2002)	Singles 93–03 (2003)	Push the Button (2005)

Singles from Singles 93–03
- 1. "The Golden Path" Released: 15 September 2003; 2. "Get Yourself High" Released: 17 November 2003

Professional ratings
Review scores
Source	Rating
AllMusic	4.5/5 stars
Drowned in Sound	6/10
Mojo	3/5 stars
Pitchfork	7.8/10
Q	3/5 stars
Resident Advisor	4/5 stars
Rolling Stone	3.5/5 stars
Stylus	A−
The Rolling Stone Album Guide	3.5/5 stars
Tom Hull – on the Web	B+

Singles 93–03 is a compilation album by English electronic music duo The Chemical Brothers, released on 22 September 2003. It is a collection of singles from the duo between 1993 and 2003 (though not all the singles are included), plus two new songs "Get Yourself High" and "The Golden Path". Early copies of the CD came with a bonus CD. It was certified gold by the BPI on 24 October 2003.

"Otter Rock", which is featured on the bonus disc as a previously unreleased song, also appears on The Big Noise (a charity CD released in The Guardian for Oxfam).

== Singles ==
"The Golden Path" was released on 15 September 2003 as the first single from the album. It reached number 17 in the UK charts. "Get Yourself High" was the second single from the album, released on 8 December 2003. It was not eligible for the UK charts because it had five songs instead of three songs, which is required for qualification.

== Track listing ==
Many of the songs are edited, even if only by roughly 10 seconds.

No.	Title	Album	Length
1.	"Song to the Siren"	Exit Planet Dust	4:30
2.	"Chemical Beats"	Exit Planet Dust	4:02
3.	"Leave Home"	Exit Planet Dust	5:05
4.	"Setting Sun" (featuring Noel Gallagher)	Dig Your Own Hole	3:59
5.	"Block Rockin' Beats"	Dig Your Own Hole	4:52
6.	"The Private Psychedelic Reel"	Dig Your Own Hole	9:06
7.	"Hey Boy Hey Girl"	Surrender	4:48
8.	"Let Forever Be" (featuring Noel Gallagher)	Surrender	3:40
9.	"Out of Control" (featuring Bernard Sumner)	Surrender	7:19
10.	"Star Guitar"	Come with Us	6:08
11.	"The Test" (featuring Richard Ashcroft)	Come with Us	6:52
12.	"Get Yourself High" (featuring k-os)	Previously unreleased	5:48
13.	"The Golden Path" (featuring The Flaming Lips)	Previously unreleased	4:46
Total length:			71:20

=== Bonus disc ===
A bonus disc was included with early copies of the CD. It features B-sides, previously unreleased material, EP tracks, remixes, and live tracks.

No.	Title	Length
1.	"Not Another Drugstore (Planet Nine Mix)"	6:52
2.	"The Duke" (previously unreleased)	5:38
3.	"If You Kling to Me I'll Klong to You" (from the My Mercury Mouth EP and Life Is Sweet)	5:23
4.	"Otter Rock" (previously unreleased)	4:08
5.	"Morning Lemon" (from "Block Rockin' Beats")	4:37
6.	"Galaxy Bounce (Original Version)" (full length version, originally featured on the soundtrack to Lara Croft: Tomb Raider; an edited version appears on Come with Us)	4:46
7.	"Loops of Fury" (from the EP of the same name)	4:43
8.	"Delik" (Remix of "Life Is Sweet", originally featured on the compilation "Trance Europe Express 4" (1995))	5:29
9.	"Elektrobank (Live)" (live from the Roxy, NYC, November '96)	7:51
10.	"Under the Influence (Mix 2)" (Mix 1 version on Surrender)	5:28
11.	"Piku Playground (Live)" (originally released in 1998 on the MTV's Amp 2 compilation. Later on the Japanese edition of "Music:Response". Originally found on Dig Your Own Hole ("Piku") and Exit Planet Dust ("Playground for a Wedgeless Firm"))	4:56
Total length:		59:56

=== DVD ===
- "Life Is Sweet" (video)
- "Setting Sun" (video)
- "Block Rockin' Beats" (video)
- "Elektrobank" (video)
- "Hey Boy Hey Girl" (video)
- "Let Forever Be" (video)
- "Out of Control" (video)
- "Star Guitar" (video)
- "The Test" (video)
- "The Golden Path" (video)

DVD extras

- "Hey Boy Hey Girl (Live from Red Rocks 1999)" (video)
- "Hoops (Live from Fuji Rock Festival 2002)" (video)
- "Setting Sun (Live from Fuji Rock Festival 2002)" (video)
- "Temptation/Star Guitar (Live from Fuji Rock Festival 2002)" (video)
- "Chemical Beats (Live from Glastonbury 1997)" (video)
- "The Private Psychedelic Reel (Live from Glastonbury 2000)" (video)
- Interviews with The Chemical Brothers, Richard Ashcroft, Tim Burgess, Norman Cook, Wayne Coyne, Noel Gallagher, Beth Orton, Justin Robertson, Sean Rowley and Bernard Sumner.
- "The Private Reels"

The album was repackaged with its original bonus disc and corresponding DVD and re-issued on Monday 26 November 2007.

== Charts ==
=== Weekly charts ===
Chart (2003)	Peak position
Australian Albums (ARIA)	44
Belgian Albums (Ultratop Flanders)	16
Belgian Albums (Ultratop Wallonia)	43
German Albums (Offizielle Top 100)	99
Italian Albums (FIMI)	12
New Zealand Albums (RMNZ)	12
Portuguese Albums (AFP)	25
Scottish Albums (Official Charts)	7
UK Albums (Official Charts)	9
US Billboard 200	123
US Top Dance Albums (Billboard)	2

=== Year-end charts ===
Chart (2003)	Position
UK Albums (OCC)	187
Chart (2004)	Position
US Top Dance/Electronic Albums (Billboard)	20

== Certifications ==
Region	Certification	Certified units/sales
Australia (ARIA)	Gold	35,000^{‡}
Japan (RIAJ)	Gold	100,000^{^}
United Kingdom (BPI)	Gold	309,717
^{^} Shipments figures based on certification alone.^{‡} Sales+streaming figures based on certification alone.
