= Brotherhood (The Chemical Brothers album) =

Greatest hits album by The Chemical Brothers
- Released: 1 September 2008
- Recorded: 1993–2008
- Genres: Big beat; electronic; trip hop; house
- Length: 73:27 (disc one); 71:49 (disc two)
- Labels: Virgin; Freestyle Dust
- Producer: The Chemical Brothers

The Chemical Brothers chronology
We Are the Night (2007)	Brotherhood (2008)	Further (2010)

Singles from Brotherhood
- 1. "Midnight Madness" Released: 4 August 2008

Professional ratings
Aggregate scores
Source	Rating
Metacritic	73/100
Review scores
Source	Rating
AllMusic	4/5 stars
Christgau's Consumer Guide	A−
Consequence of Sound	B
The Guardian	4/5 stars
musicOMH	4/5 stars
The Observer	4/5 stars
Paste	8.5/10
Pitchfork	6.3/10
PopMatters	7/10
Under the Radar	7/10

Brotherhood (subtitled The Definitive Singles Collection) is a compilation album by English electronic dance music duo The Chemical Brothers, released on 1 September 2008. It is the second compilation spanning the band's greatest hits, after 2003's Singles 93–03. The first disc features thirteen hit singles and two new tracks, "Midnight Madness" and "Keep My Composure" (featuring a guest appearance of the rap group Spank Rock)—while the second CD contains all ten parts of The Chemical Brothers' "Electronic Battle Weapon" series of special mixes, which the duo have been recording since 1996.

Brotherhood was preceded by the digital single "Midnight Madness", a short version of "Electronic Battle Weapon 10", released on 18 August 2008, and promoted by the series of live performances in July and August 2008, throughout a number of European countries. The single was promoted by user-generated content through Google Earth. Fans were challenged to produce and upload a short film, from 2 to 20 seconds long, or a photograph based on the song that would become part of its music video, to be edited by producers Nexus.

== Singles ==
"Electronic Battle Weapon 10" was released on 11 June 2008, followed by "Midnight Madness" on 4 August 2008, with the latter reaching number 80 on the UK Singles Chart.

== Track listing ==
=== Disc one ===
All tracks are written by Tom Rowlands and Ed Simons, with additional writers noted. All production handled by The Chemical Brothers.

No.	Title	Writer(s)	Original album	Length
1.	"Galvanize" (radio edit; featuring Q-Tip)	Kamaal Fareed; Najat Aatabou	Push the Button (2005)	4:29
2.	"Hey Boy Hey Girl"	Jerry Bloodrock; Celite Evans; Richard Lee Fowler; Charles Pettiford; Gregory Carlton Wigfall	Surrender (1999)	4:49
3.	"Block Rockin' Beats" (single edit)	Jesse Weaver	Dig Your Own Hole (1997)	5:00
4.	"Do It Again" (edit; featuring Ali Love)	Alexander Williams	We Are the Night (2007)	3:41
5.	"Believe" (edit; featuring Kele Okereke)	Rowland Okereke	Push the Button	6:07
6.	"Star Guitar"		Come with Us (2002)	6:10
7.	"Let Forever Be" (featuring Noel Gallagher)	Gallagher	Surrender	3:56
8.	"Leave Home"		Exit Planet Dust (1995)	5:07
9.	"Keep My Composure" (featuring Spank Rock)	Naeem Juwan	Previously unreleased	5:43
10.	"Saturate"		We Are the Night	4:48
11.	"Out of Control" (featuring Bernard Sumner)	Sumner	Surrender	7:21
12.	"Midnight Madness"		Previously unreleased	3:35
13.	"The Golden Path" (featuring The Flaming Lips)	Wayne Michael Coyne; Steven Gregory Drozd	Singles 93–03 (2003)	4:47
14.	"Setting Sun" (featuring Noel Gallagher)	Gallagher	Dig Your Own Hole	4:00
15.	"Chemical Beats"		Exit Planet Dust	4:02
Total length:				73:17

Japanese CD bonus track
No.	Title	Original album	Length
16.	"Music:Response"	Surrender	4:24
Total length:			77:41

=== Disc two ===
All tracks were written and produced by The Chemical Brothers.

No.	Title	Length
1.	"Electronic Battle Weapon 1"	6:39
2.	"Electronic Battle Weapon 2"	7:17
3.	"Electronic Battle Weapon 3"	5:08
4.	"Electronic Battle Weapon 4"	6:06
5.	"Electronic Battle Weapon 5"	8:40
6.	"Electronic Battle Weapon 6"	9:05
7.	"Electronic Battle Weapon 7"	7:27
8.	"Electronic Battle Weapon 8"	6:31
9.	"Electronic Battle Weapon 9"	6:41
10.	"Electronic Battle Weapon 10"	8:15
Total length:		71:41

== Charts ==
Chart (2008)	Peak position
Australian Albums (ARIA)	94
Austrian Albums (Ö3 Austria)	63
Belgian Albums (Ultratop Flanders)	15
Belgian Albums (Ultratop Wallonia)	29
Canadian Albums (Nielsen SoundScan)	89
French Albums (SNEP)	94
Italian Albums (FIMI)	13
Scottish Albums (Official Charts)	12
Spanish Albums (Promusicae)	94
Swiss Albums (Schweizer Hitparade)	35
UK Albums (Official Charts)	11
UK Dance Albums (Official Charts)	1
US Top Dance Albums (Billboard)	14

== Certifications ==
Region	Certification	Certified units/sales
Australia (ARIA)	Gold	35,000^{‡}
United Kingdom (BPI)	Gold	100,000^{‡}
^{‡} Sales+streaming figures based on certification alone.
