= It Began in Afrika =

2001 single by the Chemical Brothers

Single by the Chemical Brothers

from the album Come with Us
- B-side: "Hot Acid Rhythm 1"
- Released: 10 September 2001
- Recorded: 2000
- Studio: Miloco (South London, England)
- Genre: Electronic
- Length: 8:39
- Label: Freestyle Dust; Virgin
- Songwriters: Tom Rowlands; Ed Simons; Jim Ingram
- Producer: The Chemical Brothers

The Chemical Brothers singles chronology
"Music: Response" (2000)	"It Began in Afrika" (2001)	"Star Guitar" (2002)

"It Began in Afrika" is a song by British electronic music duo the Chemical Brothers. It was released as the first single from their fourth album, Come with Us, on 10 September 2001. Originally named "Electronic Battle Weapon 5" and released for DJs as a white label in June 2001, "It Began in Afrika" became a hit in clubs and was renamed for its official release. The song contains vocal samples from the track "Drumbeat" by American musician Jim Ingram, who was given a writing credit.

The official release of the song came four months before Come with Us. The song received positive reviews from critics and reached number eight on the UK Singles Chart. Despite this, the song does not feature on either of the standard versions of their singles compilations Singles 93–03 or Brotherhood, although the latter featured the original white label version on its bonus disc.

== Background ==
The duo created the track in 2000, premiering it in December 2000 when the band supported U2. Tom Rowlands of the duo initially have mixed feelings about the track, saying it had "quite a lot of percussion, big, sweeping sort of stuff. Live conga playing, quite spaced out. It's like Body & Soul, but really, really hard and twisted, it's like high-impact, full-on, but with more organic sounds, and quite intense, without the good vibe." Regardless, though the track was popular with fans, and eventually was released as a white label release, "Electronic Battle Weapon 5", in June 2001, the fifth installment in their series of "Electronic Battle Weapon" twelve-inch singles intended for disc jockeys to play in sets.

After the Chemical Brothers completed their fourth album, Come with Us, the track was renamed "It Began in Afrika" and released as an official single on 10 September 2001. The original length of the song, which was almost 10 minutes, was now edited into two different versions, the standard version of the song, which lasts eight and a half minutes, and the radio edit, which lasts three and a half minutes. The version which appears on Come with Us lasts six and a quarter minutes, segueing into the following track, "Galaxy Bounce". In the United States, the single was issued on 11 September 2001 as a limited-edition 12-inch vinyl and CD single.

The single release of "It Began in Afrika" reached number eight on the UK Singles Chart on 16 September 2001. In early 2002, Alexis Petridis of The Guardian commented that the track "may well be the most wilfully extreme and experimental piece of music ever to make the Top 10." It was their biggest hit since "Hey Boy Hey Girl" (1999) and their fifth top ten hit overall. In addition to the full length and radio edit versions of the track, the single release also contained the B-side "Hot Rhythm Acid 1".

== Critical reception ==
The track received positive reviews from critics. Nathan Rooney of Pitchfork Media said the track "is a rapid, heart-pounding conga workout that distills the quick reflexes and primal urges of a cheetah hunt under a deadpan voice repeating, "It Began In Afrika-ka-ka"," and, noting its position as the second track on Come with Us, stated the album "flies out of the gates unexpectedly with its first three tracks, immediately dragging the listener through a relentless torrent of beats and sonic energy."

Robert Christgau called the track the best "disco disc" on the special edition of the duo's compilation album Brotherhood.

Marshall Bowden of PopMatters said "It Began in Afrika" is "a kind of electronic exotica where the various percussion (both sampled and real), big cat sounds, and travelogue narrator sample combine to create an ersatz aural safari a la Les Baxter. The polyrhythmic percussion flights (timbales and bongos) are like a cross between a Santana concert and the Grateful Dead parking lot. Overall, though, the track is strong and trades on the aggressive Chemical beats sound while throwing a new angle into the mix that is sure to delight listeners and dancers."

In a more mixed-to-positive review, after noting the album is "steeped in retro-synth glory", Sal Cinquemani of Select Magazine said "It Began in Afrika" is "ripe with tribal beats and jungle-cat snarls (is that He-Man's Battlecat?), swiftly building into a percussive techno jam session. The track's weakness, however, lies in its all-too-prominent spliced-up lyrical slogans."

Reviewing Come with Us for Uncut, Simon Reynolds said that while it felt "nondescript" as a single, it now "sounds fabulous" in the "propulsive context" of the album, placed between the title track and "Galaxy Bounce". In Uncut, David Stubbs wrote that the song "slipped out with demonstrative undemonstrativeness" when released as a single. "Purporting to be the dancefloor equivalent of a radical plate-tectonic shift," he added, "it's actually a crude, sub-Transglobal Underground exercise in electronically boosted tom-toms, repetitive rather than mesmeric." Kiran Aditham of Ink19 wrote: "Tracing the ancestry of modern beats back to where it truly originated, the duo of Tom Rowlands and Ed Simons utilize a building percussive onslaught with a baritone-voiced sample to accompany their trademark acidic melodies." He adds that the duo forgo guest singers, in favour of "just the pair, their gear, and the repetitive voice blurting the song’s namesake over and over. But then again, that is all that’s necessary to get this party started, and it does so successfully."

== Track listings ==
UK CD and cassette single; US and Australian CD single

1. "It Began in Afrika" (radio edit) – 3:35
2. "It Began in Afrika" – 8:39
3. "Hot Acid Rhythm 1" – 5:04

UK and US 12-inch single; European CD single

A. "It Began in Afrika" – 8:39
B. "Hot Acid Rhythm 1" – 5:04

== Credits and personnel ==
Credits are lifted from the Come with Us album booklet.

Studios

- Recorded at Miloco Studios (South London, England)
- Edited in the Miloco Studios basement
- Mastered at The Exchange (London, England)

Personnel

- The Chemical Brothers – production
  - Tom Rowlands – writing
  - Ed Simons – writing
- Jim Ingram – writing ("Drumbeat")
- Steve Dub – engineering
- Greg Fleming – assistant engineering
- Cheeky Paul – editing
- Mike Marsh – mastering

== Charts ==
=== Weekly charts ===
Chart (2001)	Peak position
Australia (ARIA)	60
Belgium (Ultratop 50 Flanders)	46
Canada (Nielsen SoundScan)	3
Europe (Eurochart Hot 100)	33
Finland (Suomen virallinen lista)	11
France (SNEP)	69
Hungary (Mahasz)	3
Ireland (IRMA)	15
Ireland Dance (IRMA)	1
Italy (FIMI)	13
Scottish Singles Sales (Official Charts)	10
Spain (Promusicae)	1
Sweden (Sverigetopplistan)	49
Switzerland (Schweizer Hitparade)	89
UK Singles (Official Charts)	8
UK Dance (Official Charts)	1
US Dance Club Songs (Billboard)	1
US Dance Singles Sales (Billboard)	9

=== Year-end charts ===
Chart (2001)	Position
Canada (Nielsen SoundScan)	74
US Dance Club Play (Billboard)	38

== Release history ==
Region	Release date	Format(s)	Label(s)	Catalogue	Ref.
United Kingdom	10 September 2001	CD	Freestyle Dust; Virgin	CHEMSD12	
United Kingdom	10 September 2001	Cassette	Freestyle Dust; Virgin	CHEMSC12	
United Kingdom	10 September 2001	12-inch vinyl	Freestyle Dust; Virgin	CHEMST12	
United States	11 September 2001	12-inch vinyl	Astralwerks	ASW 38798	
United States	11 September 2001	CD	Astralwerks	ASW 38798-2	
Australia	17 September 2001	CD	EMI	8978652	
Japan	3 October 2001	CD	Virgin Japan	VJCP-12148	

== See also ==
- List of number-one dance singles of 2001 (U.S.)
