= Brothers Gonna Work It Out =

1998 DJ mix album by The Chemical Brothers

Compilation album (DJ mix album) by The Chemical Brothers
- Released: 22 September 1998
- Recorded: 1998
- Genre: Electronica; trip hop; big beat
- Length: 88:54
- Label: Astralwerks; Virgin; Freestyle Dust
- Producer: The Chemical Brothers

The Chemical Brothers chronology
Dig Your Own Hole (1997)	Brothers Gonna Work It Out (1998)	Surrender (1999)

Professional ratings
Review scores
Source	Rating
AllMusic	3/5 stars
Entertainment Weekly	B
The Independent	3/5 stars
NME	7/10
Pitchfork	5.4/10
Spin	7/10
Vibe	positive
Wall of Sound	79/100

Brothers Gonna Work It Out is a compilation album by English big beat duo The Chemical Brothers, containing various artists' work mixed by the duo. It was released on 22 September 1998. The cover features a picture of Our Lady of Fatima church in Harlow, Essex, England. The quote "the brother's gonna work it out" comes from a track by Willie Hutch and is also featured in the duo's earlier track "Leave Home". It peaked at number 95 on the Billboard 200 chart. As of 2002 it has sold 165,000 copies in the United States according to Nielsen SoundScan. As of 1999 it has sold 400,000+ units worldwide, mostly in the US.

The Radio 1 Anti-Nazi Mix was the basis of what would later be released as Brothers Gonna Work It Out.

== Track listing ==
No.	Title	Writer(s)	Producer(s)	Length
1.	"Brother's Gonna Work It Out" (performed by Willie Hutch)	Hutch	Hutch	4:00
2.	"Not Another Drugstore" (Planet Nine Mix) (performed by Chemical Brothers featuring Justin Warfield)	Tom Rowlands; Ed Simons; Gianni Garofalo; Warfield	The Chemical Brothers	3:25
3.	"Block Rockin' Beats" (The Micronauts Mix)	Tom Rowlands; Ed Simons; Jesse Weaver	The Chemical Brothers; Christophe Monier^{[a]}; George Issakidis^{[a]}	3:26
4.	"Ride The Rhythm (Acid not Placid)" (performed by This Ain't Chicago)	Dizzy Dee, Richard Scott, Karl Johns		4:33
5.	"It's Just Begun" (performed by The Jimmy Castor Bunch)	Jimmy Castor; John Pruitt; Gerry Thomas		3:23
6.	"Makin' A Living" (performed by Kenny Dope Presents The Powerhouse Three)	Kenny Gonzalez		3:56
7.	"Hot Wheels (The Chase)" (Badder Than Evil)	Andy Badale; Al Elias	Badder Than Evil	3:21
8.	"The Theme" (Unique Mix) (performed by Unique 3)	Unique	Unique 3; Rob Gordon	3:30
9.	"Gimme Some Love" (performed by Love Corporation)	Edward Ball		3:49
10.	"The Jazz" (performed by The Micronauts)	Issakidis; Monier	Issakidis; Monier	4:42
11.	"Sidewinder" (312 vs. 216 Stomp Mix) (performed by The Serotonin Project)	Terry Mullan; Steven Cinch		3:38
12.	"Doin' It After Dark" (D-Ski's Dance) (performed by Carlos 'After Dark' Berrios)	Berrios		5:59
13.	"Don't Stop The Rock" (performed by Freestyle)	Tony Butler		3:23
14.	"To A Nation Rockin'" (performed by Metro L.A.)	DJ Davenport; Xpando	DJ Davenport; Xpando	4:40
15.	"Morning Lemon" (performed by Chemical Brothers)	Rowlands; Simons	The Chemical Brothers	3:38
16.	"Mars Needs Women" (performed by Meat Beat Manifesto)	Jack Dangers	Dangers	3:41
17.	"Thunder" (performed by Renegade Soundwave)	Renegade Soundwave	Renegade Soundwave	3:30
18.	"Losing Control"		DBX	3:48
19.	"Mother Earth" (performed by Dubtribe Sound System)			3:00
20.	"The Riot" (Barry De Vorzon and Perry Botkin Jr.)	Vorzon; Botkin		3:53
21.	"Trip Harder" (The Ultraviolet Catastrophe)	Jon Drukman; Jeff Taylor; Mike Wertheim	Drukman; Taylor; Wertheim	3:53
22.	"Everything Must Go" (Chemical Brothers Remix) (performed by Manic Street Preachers)	James Dean Bradfield; Sean Moore; Nicky Wire	Mike Hedges; The Chemical Brothers^{[a]}	3:53
23.	"I Think I'm in Love" (Chemical Brothers Vocal Remix) (performed by Spiritualized)	J. Spaceman	J. Spaceman; The Chemical Brothers^{[a]}	3:53
Total length:				88:54

Notes

- ^{^a} signifies an additional producer/remixer
