= AmericanEP =

EP by The Chemical Brothers
- Released: 19 November 2002
- Recorded: 2001–2002
- Genre: Electronic
- Length: 40:37
- Label: Astralwerks; Virgin; EMI
- Producer: The Chemical Brothers

The Chemical Brothers chronology
Come with Us/Japan Only EP (2002)	AmericanEP (2002)	The Golden Path (2003)

Professional ratings
Review scores
Source	Rating
Rolling Stone	(not rated)

AmericanEP is an extended play by English electronica duo The Chemical Brothers, released in 2002 following the release of their successful fourth studio album Come with Us.

== Track listing ==
1. "Star Guitar (Trisco La Funk dub)" – 7:06 (Rowlands, Simons)
2. "H.I.A." – 7:14 (Rowlands, Simons, Heard, Owens)
3. "Come with Us (H Foundation remix)" – 8:17 (Rowlands, Simons, Rallo, Cooperman, Krissen, Fairstein)
4. "Electronic Battle Weapon 6" – 9:03 (Rowlands, Simons)
5. "Temptation/Star Guitar (live from Brixton Academy)" – 8:57 (Hook, Morris, Sumner, Gilbert, Rowlands, Simons)
6. "Star Guitar" (video) – 4:01
7. "The Test" (video) – 4:39

== Come with Us/Japan Only EP ==
Come with Us Japan Only EP

EP by The Chemical Brothers
- Released: (Japan) 17 July 2002
- Recorded: 2002
- Genre: Electronica
- Length: 36:00 (EP)
- Label: Virgin

The Chemical Brothers chronology
Come with Us/The Test (2002)	Come with Us Japan Only EP (2002)	AmericanEP (2002)

Come with Us/Japan Only EP is the Japanese EP from The Chemical Brothers 2002 album Come with Us. This album is very similar to AmericanEP, except that it has two different songs and different videos.

=== Track listing ===
1. "Come With Us (radio edit)" – 3:40
2. "Star Guitar (Trisco La Funk dub)" – 7:06
3. "H.I.A." – 7:10
4. "Come With Us (H Foundation remix)" – 8:09
5. "Temptation/Star Guitar (live from Brixton Academy)" – 8:55
6. "Let Forever Be (video)"
