= Loops of Fury =

EP by The Chemical Brothers
- Released: 15 January 1996
- Recorded: 1995
- Genre: Big beat; breakbeat
- Length: 20:23
- Label: Virgin
- Producer: The Chemical Brothers

Professional ratings
Review scores
Source	Rating
Allmusic	4/5 stars
Robert Christgau	(1-star Honorable Mention)

Loops of Fury is an extended play by English big beat duo The Chemical Brothers, released in 1996. It reached number 13 on the UK Singles Chart, but only stayed in the top 75 for one week.

The title track exemplifies the squelching synth lines and hard-hitting drums that became The Chemical Brothers' sound of the late 1990s, and would be the blueprint of their tracks for years to come. The voice samples in "Get Up on It Like This" come from a radio show performed by Afrika Islam in 1983. From that show also come the vocals "We're 'bout ready to rock steady" that appear on "Block Rockin Beats". It was used in the PlayStation game Wipeout 2097 and appeared on the accompanying soundtrack. It was also included on the bonus disc of Singles 93–03, and as a B-side to the Japanese edition of "Setting Sun". Because the song segues into the next track on the EP, the ending is edited on compilation releases; it fades out on compilations of various artists, while on Singles 93–03, it is interrupted by a vinyl scratch.

"Get Up on It Like This" was included in a reworked form on the subsequent album, Dig Your Own Hole.

== Track listing ==
No.	Title	Length
1.	"Loops of Fury"	4:40
2.	"(The Best Part Of) Breaking Up"	5:44
3.	"Get Up on It Like This"	5:54
4.	"Chemical Beats (Dave Clarke remix)"	4:05
Total length:		20:23
