= Midnight Madness (song) =

Single by The Chemical Brothers

from the album Brotherhood
- Released: 3 August 2008
- Recorded: 2008
- Length: 3:35
- Label: Freestyle Dust; Virgin
- Songwriters: Tom Rowlands; Ed Simons
- Producer: The Chemical Brothers

The Chemical Brothers singles chronology
"The Salmon Dance" (2007)	"Midnight Madness" (2008)	"Swoon" (2010)

Music video
- "Midnight Madness" on YouTube

"Midnight Madness" is a song by English electronic music duo The Chemical Brothers, taken from their second greatest hits album Brotherhood. It was released on 3 August 2008 as a digital download in the UK, followed by a release in the US on 19 August 2008.

The song is a shorter version of "Electronic Battle Weapon 10", which was released shortly before.

It is featured in the sports game Pro Evolution Soccer 2010 and in the racing game Midnight Club: Los Angeles.

== Music videos ==
The video is set in a back alley and warehouse in London. It begins with a goblin (played mainly by Daniel Ilabaca), who jumps out of a wheelie-bin, and starts dancing. His dancing takes him out of the alley and up onto the nearby rooftops, then into a theatre. The goblin begins breakdancing (now played by Pockemon crew breakdancer, Lilou) on the stage. He exits, jumps onto a police car, and rides it back to the dumpster, when he jumps in moments before a man walks into the alley and dumps a bag of trash into the dumpster.

The second version shows Google Earth, zooming into little dots that have The Chemical Brothers logo. They show videos of people around the world dancing to "Midnight Madness". The Chemical Brothers had a contest off their website in 2008 to post homemade videos for the music video, leading up to the release of Brotherhood.

== Track listing ==
1. "Midnight Madness" (EBW 10 version) – 5:13
2. "Midnight Madness" (extended version) – 8:10
3. "Midnight Madness" (album version) – 4:11
4. "Midnight Madness" (radio edit version) – 3:35

== Chart performance ==
The song debuted on the UK Singles Chart on 10 August 2008, and climbed to its peak of number 80 two weeks later.

Weekly chart performance for "Midnight Madness"
Chart (2008)	Peak position
Japan Hot 100 (Billboard Japan)	33
UK Singles (OCC)	80
