= Live at the Social Volume 1 =

Live album by The Chemical Brothers
- Released: May 1996
- Genre: Electronica; breaks
- Length: 63:32
- Label: Heavenly
- Producer: Tom Rowlands; Ed Simons

The Chemical Brothers chronology
Exit Planet Dust (1995)	Live at the Social Volume 1 (1996)	Dig Your Own Hole (1997)

Professional ratings
Review scores
Source	Rating
Allmusic	3.5/5 stars

Live at the Social Volume 1 is a mix album by English big beat duo The Chemical Brothers, released in the UK in May 1996 as its only release. It has also been bootlegged under the album name AuGmEnTeD, which has the same music, but with different song titles.

It is a recording of a live set at The Social, a nightclub in the United Kingdom.

It was released by Heavenly Records (who own the club where the album was recorded), rather than Virgin Records, but both are labels owned by music giant EMI.

It entered the UK compilations chart at number 19.

In 1997, Q ranked the album in their list of "The 10 Best DJ Mix Albums...Ever!".

== Track listing ==
1. The Chemical Brothers – "Introduction" – 0:36
2. Meat Beat Manifesto – "Cutman" – 5:20
3. Davy DMX – "The DMX Will Rock" – 0:49
4. Cash Money and Marvelous – "Mighty Hard Rocker" – 3:43
5. Crooklyn Clan – "Yes, We Can" – 1:57
6. Carlos 'After Dark' Berrios – "Doin' it After Dark (D-Ski's Dance)" – 0:48
7. Tainted Glass – "Can't" – 2:07
8. Eric B & Rakim – "Juice (Know the Ledge) (Main Mix)" – 3:18
9. Red Snapper – "Wesley Don't Surf" – 3:09
10. Lionrock – "Packet of Peace (Chemical Brothers Remix)" – 4:36
11. DJ Who – "PB4UGO2BED" – 3:30
12. Metro L.A. – "To a Nation Rockin'" – 3:42
13. The Chemical Brothers – "Get Up on It Like This" – 5:16
14. Tim 'Love' Lee – "Again Son" – 4:13
15. The Charlatans – "Nine Acre Dust (Chemical Brothers Remix)" – 3:52
16. Funk D'Void – "Jack Me Off" – 5:58
17. Will Web – "Mirrorshades" – 2:42
18. Selectah – "Wede Man (Hoody Mix)" – 4:54
19. Eddie Bo – "We’re Doing It (Thang)" – 3:02
