= Teenage Talk =

Single by St. Vincent
- Released: April 7, 2015
- Genre: Art rock
- Length: 4:08
- Label: Seven Four/Loma Vista
- Songwriter: Annie Clark
- Producer: John Congleton

St. Vincent singles chronology
"Bad Believer" (2015)	"Teenage Talk" (2015)	"Under Neon Lights" (2015)

"Teenage Talk" is a song written and performed by American art rock musician St. Vincent, released digitally on April 7, 2015.

== Promotion and release ==
St. Vincent initially composed the song for inclusion on her eponymous album released in 2014, but the song did not make the album's final track listing. A snippet of the song was used prior to its official release during the fourth season of the HBO television series Girls, in the episode "Tad & Loreen & Avi & Shanaz". St. Vincent performed the song live for the first time on April 6, 2015 on The Tonight Show Starring Jimmy Fallon; and the song was officially released via iTunes on April 7.

== Critical reception ==
The song has received positive reviews. Sharan Shetty of Slate called the song "wistful" and "a pensive coming-of-age tune". Chris DeVille of Stereogum also praised the song, further stating that it is "more moody and straightforward" than St. Vincent's previous work.

== Personnel ==
Credits adapted from Tidal.

- Annie Clark – songwriting, vocals, guitar
- McKenzie Smith – drums
- Bobby Sparks – synthesizer
- Daniel Mintseris – keyboards, harpsichord
- John Congleton – production
