= Electronic Battle Weapon =

1996 promotional single by the Chemical Brothers

Promotional single by The Chemical Brothers
- Released: 1 June 1996–1 March 2019
- Recorded: 1995–2019
- Genre: Big beat; acid house; electro house; electronica
- Label: Freestyle Dust; Virgin; Astralwerks; Virgin EMI; Parlophone
- Producer: The Chemical Brothers

"Electronic Battle Weapon" is a series of promotional records by The Chemical Brothers made for DJs to test in clubs. The songs have been used as tracks in several albums as well as B-sides of other singles. The greatest hits album, Brotherhood, reprinted "Electronic Battle Weapon" from 1 through to 10 as part of disc 2.

== Singles ==
Information
Electronic Battle Weapon 1 (1 June 1996) XDUSTLPDJ 2
1. "Electronic Battle Weapon 1" – "It Doesn't Matter" – 6:38

Notes:

"Electronic Battle Weapon 1" was renamed "It Doesn't Matter" and featured on The Chemical Brothers second album Dig Your Own Hole as track six. The vocal sample was taken from "It Comes on Anyhow" by Lothar and the Hand People.

Electronic Battle Weapon 2 (1 June 1996) XDUSTLPDJ 2
1. "Electronic Battle Weapon 2" – "Don't Stop the Rock" – 7:14
Notes:

"Electronic Battle Weapon 2" was renamed "Don't Stop the Rock" and featured on The Chemical Brothers second album Dig Your Own Hole as track seven.

Electronic Battle Weapon 3 (1 June 1998) XDUSTLPDJ 3
1. "Electronic Battle Weapon 3" – "Under the Influence" – 5:05
Notes:

"Electronic Battle Weapon 3" was renamed "Under the Influence" on The Chemical Brothers' third album Surrender. It would later on appear in the soundtrack for Wipeout 3, while the original "Electronic Battle Weapn" mix appeared in Wipeout 2048.

Electronic Battle Weapon 4 (1 June 1998) XDUSTLPDJ 3
1. "Electronic Battle Weapon 4" – "Freak of the Week" – 6:11
Notes:

"Electronic Battle Weapon 4" was renamed "Freak of the Week" and featured as a B-side on the "Music: Response" single.

Electronic Battle Weapon 5 (1 June 2001) CHEMSTDJ12
1. "Electronic Battle Weapon 5" – "It Began in Afrika" – 8:39
Notes:

"Electronic Battle Weapon 5" was renamed "It Began in Afrika'" and featured on The Chemical Brothers' fourth album Come with Us as track two. The song contains a sample from the song "Drumbeat" by Jim Ingram.

Electronic Battle Weapon 6 (1 June 2002) CHEMSTDJ17
1. "Electronic Battle Weapon 6" – "Hoops (remix)" – 9:05
Notes:

"Electronic Battle Weapon 6" is a remix of the song "Hoops" from The Chemical Brothers' fourth album Come with Us. It featured on both the AmericanEP and as a B-side on the "Get Yourself High" single.

Electronic Battle Weapon 7 (1 June 2004) CHEMSTDJ20
1. "Electronic Battle Weapon 7" – 7:27
Notes:

"Electronic Battle Weapon 7" featured as a B-side on the "Galvanize" single. The song contains a sample from the movie A Nightmare on Elm Street Part 2: Freddy's Revenge. It was one of the most popular new tracks of the Live 04 tour, where it was played in full. On subsequent tours, only a sample of the song has been played in between tracks.

Electronic Battle Weapon 8 (1 June 2006) CHEMSTDJ24
1. "Electronic Battle Weapon 8" – "Saturate" – 6:31
Notes:

A shorter, edited version of "Electronic Battle Weapon 8" was subsequently released on We Are the Night under the title "Saturate".

Electronic Battle Weapon 9 (1 June 2006) CHEMSTDJ24
1. "Electronic Battle Weapon 9" – 6:41
Notes:

"Electronic Battle Weapon 9" was released as the B-side to "Electronic Battle Weapon 8". It is also included in the two-disc edition of the compilation album Brotherhood. The song does not have an official title.

Electronic Battle Weapon 10 (1 June 2008) CHEMSTDJ27
1. "Electronic Battle Weapon 10" – "Midnight Madness" – 8:14

Notes:

A shorter version of "Electronic Battle Weapon 10" was made available for download as a single on 4 August 2008, under the title "Midnight Madness". Both versions of the song were later released on the compilation album Brotherhood. It was also featured on the soundtracks of Pro Evolution Soccer 2010 and Midnight Club: Los Angeles.

Electronic Battle Weapon 11 (1 June 2015) CHEMSTDJ29
1. "Electronic Battle Weapon 11" – "Sometimes I Feel So Deserted" – 5:38

Notes:

On 9 March 2015, Ed Simons uploaded a photo to Instagram showing the next "Electronic Battle Weapon". It was later renamed "Sometimes I Feel So Deserted" and featured on their Born in the Echoes album.

MAH (Electronic Battle Weapon version) (1 March 2019) CHEMST 32
1. "Free Yourself"

2. "MAH (Electronic Battle Weapon version)"

Notes:

Announced on 17 January 2019 as a 12", featuring the two singles "Free Yourself" and "MAH" from their No Geography album. This is the first "Electronic Battle Weapon" single to break the tradition of a) using a 1 June release date, b) using the standard "Electronic Battle Weapon" vinyl labels, and c) titling the single "Electronic Battle Weapon [X]".
