= Got to Keep On =

"Got to Keep On" is a song by the English duo the Chemical Brothers, released on 1 February 2019, as part of their album No Geography. It won Grammy Award for Best Dance/Electronic Recording at the 62nd Annual Grammy Awards.
