= Go (The Chemical Brothers song) =

Single by the Chemical Brothers

from the album Born in the Echoes
- Released: 4 May 2015
- Genre: Electronica; trip hop; funk
- Length: 4:20
- Label: Virgin EMI
- Songwriters: Tom Rowlands; Ed Simons; Kamaal Fareed
- Producer: The Chemical Brothers

The Chemical Brothers singles chronology
"Sometimes I Feel So Deserted" (2015)	"Go" (2015)	"Under Neon Lights" (2015)

Music video
- "Go" on YouTube

"Go" is a song by British electronic music duo The Chemical Brothers, released on 4 May 2015 as the second single from their eighth studio album Born in the Echoes (2015). The song was written and produced by Tom Rowlands and Ed Simons alongside American rapper Q-Tip, who also provides uncredited vocals.

Upon release, "Go" reached number 46 on the UK Singles Chart. Following its usage in the film Apex (2026), the song experienced a resurgence in popularity, peaking at number 4 in the UK and becoming the Chemical Brothers' first top-ten appearance in 21 years.

== Music video ==
The official music video, directed by Michel Gondry, was released on YouTube on 4 May 2015. In the video, seven women wearing vintage sci-fi outfits march through the brutalist architecture of the Front de Seine district in Paris.

== Commercial performance ==
Upon initial release, "Go" reached number 46 on the UK Singles Chart. As of September 2017, the single was certified Silver by the British Phonographic Industry.

After featuring in the 2026 film Apex, the song experienced a resurgence in popularity, reaching a new peak of number 4 on the UK Singles Chart; becoming the duo's first top-ten single in 22 years (following "Galvanize" in 2004).

== Awards and nominations ==
Grammy Award nominations for "Go"
Year	Nominee / work	Award	Result	Ref.
58th Grammy Awards	"Go"	Best Dance Recording	Nominated	

== Usage in other media ==
"Go" was featured in the racing video game Need for Speed (2015), in the 2017 film Baywatch, in the launch trailer of Crash Bandicoot 4: It's About Time (2020), an advertisement for Vodafone New Zealand, the 2022 DreamWorks Animation film The Bad Guys, and the first episode of the third season of Invincible.

== Credits and personnel ==
The Chemical Brothers:

- Tom Rowlands – writing, production
- Ed Simons – writing, production

=== Other musicians ===
- Kamaal Fareed – vocals, writing

== Charts ==
=== Weekly charts ===
2015 weekly chart performance
Chart (2015)	Peak position
Australia (ARIA)	56
Austria (Ö3 Austria Top 40)	56
Belgium (Ultratop 50 Flanders)	24
Belgium Dance (Ultratop Flanders)	4
Belgium (Ultratip Bubbling Under Wallonia)	14
Belgium Dance (Ultratop Wallonia)	50
France (SNEP)	169
Ireland (IRMA)	76
Italy (FIMI)	48
Japan Hot 100 (Billboard)	35
Mexico Ingles Airplay (Billboard)	13
Switzerland (Schweizer Hitparade)	73
UK Singles (Official Charts)	46
UK Dance (Official Charts)	11

2026 weekly chart performance
Chart (2026)	Peak position
Australia (ARIA)	11
Austria (Ö3 Austria Top 40)	38
Czech Republic Singles Digital (ČNS IFPI)	17
Germany (GfK)	47
Germany Dance (GfK)	2
Global 200 (Billboard)	81
Greece International (IFPI)	70
Iceland (Billboard)	8
Ireland (IRMA)	9
Latvia Airplay (TopHit)	42
Latvia Streaming (LaIPA)	2
Lithuania (AGATA)	3
Moldova Airplay (TopHit)	162
Norway (IFPI Norge)	74
Poland (Polish Streaming Top 100)	21
Russia Streaming (TopHit)	7
Slovakia Singles Digital (ČNS IFPI)	4
South Africa Streaming (TOSAC)	71
Sweden (Sverigetopplistan)	79
Switzerland (Schweizer Hitparade)	29
Ukraine Airplay (TopHit)	33
UK Singles (Official Charts)	4
UK Dance (Official Charts)	1
US Digital Song Sales (Billboard)	2
US Hot Dance/Electronic Songs (Billboard)	3

=== Monthly charts ===
Monthly chart performance
Chart (2026)	Peak position
Latvia Airplay (TopHit)	65
Lithuania Airplay (TopHit)	71
Russia Streaming (TopHit)	14

== Certifications ==
Region	Certification	Certified units/sales
Australia (ARIA)	Platinum	70,000^{‡}
Italy (FIMI)	Gold	25,000^{‡}
New Zealand (RMNZ)	Platinum	30,000^{‡}
Poland (ZPAV)	Gold	62,500^{‡}
United Kingdom (BPI)	Platinum	600,000^{‡}
^{‡} Sales+streaming figures based on certification alone.

== Release history ==
Release history and formats for "Go"
Region	Date	Format(s)	Label	Ref.
5 May 2015	United Kingdom	Digital download; streaming	Virgin EMI	
7 July 2015	United States	US dance radio	Virgin EMI	
