= Under Neon Lights =

Single by the Chemical Brothers featuring St. Vincent

from the album Born in the Echoes
- Released: 23 June 2015
- Genre: Electronic
- Length: 4:26
- Label: Astralwerks (US); Virgin EMI (UK)
- Songwriters: Tom Rowlands; Ed Simons; Annie Clark
- Producers: Tom Rowlands; Ed Simons

The Chemical Brothers singles chronology
"Go" (2015)	"Under Neon Lights" (2015)	"Wide Open" (2016)

St. Vincent singles chronology
"Teenage Talk" (2015)	"Under Neon Lights" (2015)	"New York" (2017)

Music video
- "Under Neon Lights" on YouTube

"Under Neon Lights" is a song co-written, produced and performed by British electronic band the Chemical Brothers, issued as the third single from the band's eighth studio album Born in the Echoes. The song features vocals from American art rock musician St. Vincent, who also serves as co-writer.

== Promotion and release ==
"Under Neon Lights" had its world premiere on BBC Radio 6 Music on 22 June 2015.

== Critical reception ==
"Under Neon Lights" has received positive reviews. Douglas Wolk of Billboard complimented the music as well as St. Vincent's vocals, which he compared positively to Talking Heads' album Remain in Light. Tom Breihan of Stereogum also praised St. Vincent's vocals, adding that although the music has a sound closer to the Chemical Brothers than to her, "she still sounds like she belongs on the track". John Cameron of We Got This Covered referred to the song as a "stylistic update" to the Chemical Brothers' catalogue.

== Music videos ==
The official music video for "Under Neon Lights" was directed by Adam Smith. A second official music video for "Under Neon Lights" directed by Jono Brandel and Zach Richter was published by Within on 12 April 2017.
