= The Private Psychedelic Reel =

Single by The Chemical Brothers

from the album Dig Your Own Hole
- Released: 1 December 1997
- Recorded: 1997
- Studio: Orinoco (South London, England)
- Genre: Big beat; techno; psychedelia
- Length: 9:22
- Label: Virgin
- Songwriters: Jonathan Daniel Donahue; Tom Rowlands; Ed Simons
- Producer: The Chemical Brothers

The Chemical Brothers singles chronology
"Elektrobank" (1997)	"The Private Psychedelic Reel" (1997)	"Only 4 the K People" (1999)

"The Private Psychedelic Reel" is a song by The Chemical Brothers. It was the closing track of their second album, Dig Your Own Hole, and was released as a numbered limited-edition single. The B-side was a live version of "Setting Sun".

An un-numbered edition without extras was also released.

The NME rated the track as the 25th best song of 1997. In 1999, music critic Tom Ewing ranked it at number 21 in his list of the "Top 100 Singles of the 90s".

== Track listing ==
All tracks are written by The Chemical Brothers.

No.	Title	Length
1.	"The Private Psychedelic Reel"	9:22
2.	"Setting Sun (live version)"	8:45
