= For That Beautiful Feeling =

2023 studio album by the Chemical Brothers

Studio album by the Chemical Brothers
- Released: 8 September 2023
- Recorded: 2020–2023
- Studio: Rowlands Audio Research (Sussex, England)
- Genre: Electronica
- Length: 46:58
- Label: Virgin (UK) Republic (US)
- Producer: The Chemical Brothers

The Chemical Brothers chronology
No Geography (2019)	For That Beautiful Feeling (2023)

Singles from For That Beautiful Feeling
- 1. "The Darkness That You Fear" Released: 23 April 2021; 2. "No Reason" Released: 17 March 2023; 3. "Live Again" Released: 28 June 2023; 4. "Skipping Like a Stone" Released: 21 August 2023; 5. "Goodbye" Released: 3 November 2023

For That Beautiful Feeling is the tenth studio album by English electronic music duo the Chemical Brothers, released on 8 September 2023 through Virgin Records in the UK and Republic Records in the US. It is the duo's first album in four years, as well as their first to be released by Republic in the US, as all prior American releases were via Astralwerks. In November 2023, the album was nominated for the Grammy Award for Best Electronic/Dance Album at the 66th Annual Grammy Awards.

== Background ==
The band announced the album's name and track list on 19 July 2023.

The album was paired with a career-spanning retrospective book Paused in Cosmic Reflection published by White Rabbit on 26 October 2023. The book is made up of new interviews with the band, as well as many of their friends and collaborators from the past three decades, including Noel Gallagher, Aurora, Wayne Coyne, Beth Orton, Beck, and Michel Gondry.

== Critical reception ==
Professional ratings
Aggregate scores
Source	Rating
AnyDecentMusic?	7.8/10
Metacritic	81/100
Review scores
Source	Rating
AllMusic	3.5/5 stars
The Arts Desk	5/5 stars
Clash	8/10
Evening Standard	5/5 stars
The Irish Times	3.5/5 stars
The Line of Best Fit	8/10
musicOMH	4.5/5 stars
NME	4/5 stars
Rolling Stone	4/5 stars
Uncut	8/10

For That Beautiful Feeling received a score of 81 out of 100 on review aggregator Metacritic based on nine critics' reviews, indicating "universal acclaim". Uncut wrote that the Chemical Brothers "produce a whole lot of full-fat dance-pop joy" on the album. Damien Morris of The Observer described it as a "nonsense-free reaffirmation of the dance duo's greatest strength – making largely instrumental psychedelic house and techno somehow sound like pop music".

== Track listing ==
For That Beautiful Feeling track listing
No.	Title	Writer(s)	Length
1.	"Intro"	Tom Rowlands; Ed Simons	1:09
2.	"Live Again" (featuring Halo Maud)	Rowlands; Simons	5:09
3.	"No Reason"	Rowlands; Simons; Graham Bailey; Adrian Borland	4:52
4.	"Goodbye"	Rowlands; Simons; Robert Argyrios Gantzos	5:49
5.	"Fountains"	Rowlands; Simons	3:45
6.	"Magic Wand"	Rowlands; Simons; Jerome Lenoir	2:27
7.	"The Weight"	Rowlands; Simons; Michael Barrington Brown; Juanita Holloway; Edward O'Sullivan Lee; Wilbert Moore; Michael Serrette	3:44
8.	"Skipping Like a Stone" (featuring Beck)	Rowlands; Simons; Beck Hansen	4:43
9.	"The Darkness That You Fear" (Harvest Mix)	Rowlands; Simons; Willie J. Ellison	4:09
10.	"Feels Like I Am Dreaming"	Rowlands; Simons; Ellie Rowsell	6:57
11.	"For That Beautiful Feeling" (featuring Halo Maud)	Rowlands; Simons	4:14
Total length:			46:58

For That Beautiful Feeling (Japanese exclusive version) track listing
No.	Title	Writer(s)	Length
12.	"All of a Sudden"	Rowlands; Simons	5:30
13.	"I Want to Know"	Rowlands; Simons	3:56
Total length:			56:24

For That Beautiful Feeling (Collectors Edition USB) track listing
No.	Title	Writer(s)	Length
12.	"No Reason" (extended mix)	Rowlands; Simons; Bailey; Borland	4:39
13.	"Live Again" (featuring Halo Maud; extended mix)	Rowlands; Simons	6:37
14.	"Skipping Like a Stone" (featuring Beck; extended mix)	Rowlands; Simons; Hansen	7:15
15.	"All of a Sudden"	Rowlands; Simons	5:30
Total length:			70:59

== Personnel ==
The Chemical Brothers

- Tom Rowlands – production, programming, mixing, engineering (all tracks); vocals (tracks 5, 8)
- Ed Simons – production, programming

Additional musicians

- Halo Maud – vocals (1, 2, 11)
- Beck – vocals (8)

Technical

- Mike Marsh – mastering
- Steve "Dub" Jones – mixing, engineering

== Charts ==
Chart performance for For That Beautiful Feeling
Chart (2023)	Peak position
Australian Albums (ARIA)	70
Belgian Albums (Ultratop Flanders)	65
Belgian Albums (Ultratop Wallonia)	48
Croatian International Albums (HDU)	7
French Albums (SNEP)	64
German Albums (Offizielle Top 100)	23
Irish Albums (IRMA)	85
Japanese Albums (Oricon)	45
Japanese Digital Albums (Oricon)	11
Japanese Hot Albums (Billboard Japan)	33
Scottish Albums (OCC)	3
Spanish Albums (Promusicae)	65
Swiss Albums (Schweizer Hitparade)	16
UK Albums (OCC)	6
UK Dance Albums (OCC)	1
