= My Mercury Mouth E.P =

EP by The Dust Brothers
- Released: 1994
- Length: 17:56
- Label: Junior Boys Own
- Producer: The Dust Brothers

The Dust Brothers chronology
| Fourteenth Century Sky (1994) | My Mercury Mouth E.P (1994) | Leave Home (1995) |

My Mercury Mouth E.P is an extended play (EP) by English big beat duo The Chemical Brothers, and their final release under the name The Dust Brothers. The EP contains two new songs, "My Mercury Mouth" and "Dust-Up-Beats", as well as the B-side "If You Kling To Me I'll Klong You", later released on the Japan "Leave Home" single, "Life Is Sweet" CD2 single, and Singles 93–03 releases.

The first pressings of this release featured a different song in place of Dust-Up-Beats of the same name. After about 50 copies were made, the track was replaced with the official version.

Another EP, Fourteenth Century Sky, is often believed to have been released on the same day. In fact, it came earlier in the year.

This marks the first appearance of the song "If You Kling to Me I'll Klong You", which is also known for having an extended title ("If You Kling to Me I'll Klong to You"), where only a "to" was added.

The title song is the only A-side by The Chemical Brothers not to be released on a Chemical Brothers CD. Some people mistake this for never being released on CD, though it appeared on the 2-CD album JBO A Perspective 88–98.

"Dust-Up-Beats" would later appear in the 1996 video game Wipeout 2097 and its accompanying soundtrack album.

== Track listings ==
All tracks are written by The Dust Brothers

Side one
| No. | Title | Length |
|---|---|---|
| 1. | "My Mercury Mouth" | 5:53 |
| 2. | "If You Kling To Me I'll Klong To You" | 5:23 |

Side two
| No. | Title | Length |
|---|---|---|
| 3. | "Dust-Up-Beats" | 6:50 |
| Total length: | | 17:56 |
