= No Geography =

2019 studio album by the Chemical Brothers

Studio album by the Chemical Brothers
- Released: 12 April 2019
- Studio: Rowlands Audio Research (Sussex, England)
- Genre: Electronica
- Length: 46:50
- Label: Virgin EMI (UK) Astralwerks (US)
- Producer: The Chemical Brothers

The Chemical Brothers chronology
Born in the Echoes (2015)	No Geography (2019)	For That Beautiful Feeling (2023)

Singles from No Geography
- 1. "Free Yourself" Released: 28 September 2018; 2. "MAH" Released: 7 January 2019; 3. "Got to Keep On" Released: 1 February 2019; 4. "We've Got to Try" Released: 8 March 2019; 5. "Eve of Destruction" Released: 11 June 2019

No Geography is the ninth studio album by English electronic music duo the Chemical Brothers, released on 12 April 2019 by Virgin EMI Records in the United Kingdom and by Astralwerks in the United States. The album features vocals by Norwegian singer Aurora and Japanese rapper Nene.

The album won the Grammy Award for Best Electronic/Dance Album at the 62nd Annual Grammy Awards.

== Background ==
The album's name was announced in November 2018. The album takes its name from a line in the poem Geography by the New York poet Michael Brownstein, whose reading of it is sampled on the title track.

The album's cover is an image taken from the booklet of the 1977 album Consequences by Godley & Creme. The artwork is that of a motorway or autobahn from the point of view of the rear of an early British Chieftain main battle tank turret; looking out over the gun, behind the commander of the tank, toward the empty highway ahead. The 'cloud face' on the cover of 'Consequences' is visible in the sky.

== Promotion ==
The first single, "Free Yourself", was released on 28 September 2018, with "MAH" (Mad as Hell) following on 7 January 2019. Music videos were filmed for both songs. On 1 February they released the third single, "Got to Keep On", accompanied by a music video directed by Michel Gondry. It served as a theme tune for the BBC's television coverage of Glastonbury 2019. On 8 March, the Chemical Brothers released the fourth single, "We've Got to Try", accompanied by a music video.

To support the album, the duo embarked on North American tour dates in May 2019, followed by European and Australian concerts later in 2019.

== Critical reception ==
Professional ratings
Aggregate scores
Source	Rating
AnyDecentMusic?	7.7/10
Metacritic	79/100
Review scores
Source	Rating
AllMusic	3.5/5 stars
Consequence of Sound	B+
Clash	9/10
The Guardian	4/5 stars
Exclaim!	7/10
Mojo	4/5 stars
musicOMH	4/5 stars
NME	4/5 stars
Pitchfork	8.0/10
Rolling Stone	2.5/5 stars

On the review aggregator Metacritic, which assigns a weighted mean rating out of 100 to reviews from mainstream critics, No Geography gained an average score of 79, indicating "generally positive reviews", based on 20 reviews. Thomas Smith of NME said the album is "another leap forward" for the Chemical Brothers. Luke Pearson of Exclaim! expressed a lack of enthusiasm for the album's second half, yet ultimately left a positive review, stating "even b-tier work from the Chemical Brothers is worthy of interest". Pitchfork stated the album blended "psychedelic sensory overload with riotous club bangers" and said "the shape-shifting electronic duo’s ninth album is their most entertaining in years."

=== Year-end rankings ===
Publication	Accolade	Rank	Ref.
Afisha Daily (Russia)	The Best Foreign Albums of 2019	18	

== Track listing ==
All tracks are written by Edward Simons and Thomas Rowlands, with additional writers noted.

No Geography track listing
No.	Title	Writer(s)	Length
1.	"Eve of Destruction"	Aurora Aksnes; James Calloway; Leroy O-Neil Jackson Jr.; Nene	4:40
2.	"Bango"	Aksnes	4:07
3.	"No Geography"		3:09
4.	"Got to Keep On"	Peter Brown; Robert Rans; Robert McKuen	5:16
5.	"Gravity Drops"		4:30
6.	"The Universe Sent Me"	Aksnes	6:03
7.	"We've Got to Try"	Richard Pegue	3:35
8.	"Free Yourself"	Diane di Prima	4:21
9.	"MAH"	William Michael Lewis; Laurin Martin Rinder	5:35
10.	"Catch Me I'm Falling"	Simon Philip Raymonde; Stephanie Dosen; Mike Hanks	5:28
Total length:			46:44

Japanese edition bonus tracks
No.	Title	Writer(s)	Length
11.	"Fantai"		6:48
12.	"MAH" (Electronic Battle Weapon Version)	Lewis; Rinder	7:52
13.	"Got to Keep On" (Extended Mix)	Brown; Rans; McKuen	7:05
Total length:			68:34

Adapted from No Geography liner notes:

- "Eve of Destruction" incorporates a sample of "Weekend" by Class Action.
- "Got to Keep On" incorporates an interpolation of "Dance with Me" by Peter Brown.
- "We've Got to Try" incorporates a sample of "I've Got to Find a Way" by the Halleluiah Chorus.
- "Free Yourself" incorporates a sample of "Revolutionary Letter 49" by Diane di Prima.
- "MAH" incorporates a sample of "I'm Mad as Hell" by El Coco.
- "Catch Me I'm Falling" incorporates samples of "Bears on My Trail" by Snowbird and "A Letter from Vietnam" by Emanuel Laskey.

== Charts ==
Chart (2019)	Peak position
Australian Albums (ARIA)	17
Austrian Albums (Ö3 Austria)	26
Belgian Albums (Ultratop Flanders)	9
Belgian Albums (Ultratop Wallonia)	19
Czech Albums (ČNS IFPI)	31
Dutch Albums (Album Top 100)	26
French Albums (SNEP)	48
German Albums (Offizielle Top 100)	18
Hungarian Albums (MAHASZ)	32
Irish Albums (IRMA)	21
Italian Albums (FIMI)	35
Japan Hot Albums (Billboard Japan)	13
Japanese Albums (Oricon)	19
Lithuanian Albums (AGATA)	29
Portuguese Albums (AFP)	19
Scottish Albums (OCC)	2
Spanish Albums (Promusicae)	15
Swiss Albums (Schweizer Hitparade)	10
UK Albums (OCC)	4
US Top Dance Albums (Billboard)	3
