= Born in the Echoes =

- Standard edition cover

Studio album by the Chemical Brothers
- Released: 17 July 2015
- Genres: Big beat; Electronica
- Length: 52:25
- Label: Virgin EMI (UK) Astralwerks (US)
- Producer: The Chemical Brothers

The Chemical Brothers chronology
Don't Think (2012)	Born in the Echoes (2015)	No Geography (2019)

Singles from Born in the Echoes
- 1. "Sometimes I Feel So Deserted" Released: 21 April 2015; 2. "Go" Released: 4 May 2015; 3. "Wide Open" Released: 12 February 2016

Born in the Echoes is the eighth studio album by English electronic music duo the Chemical Brothers, released on 17 July 2015 by Virgin EMI Records in the United Kingdom and Astralwerks in the United States. It was their first studio album since 2010's Further. The album debuted at number 1 on the UK Albums Chart, marking the duo's sixth chart topper and making them the dance act with the most number-one albums ever in the UK.

The fourth track on the album, "EML Ritual" featured on the O2 "Priority Tickets – Follow the Rabbit" television commercial released in February 2018.

== Promotion and release ==
The album's first single, "Sometimes I Feel So Deserted" with vocals by Daniel Pearce, was released on 21 April 2015. The second single, "Go", was released on 5 May. "Under Neon Lights" was released as the third single on 23 June 2015, and features St. Vincent, credited by her real name (Annie Clark) on vocals.

The album was released on 17 July 2015.

== Reception ==
Professional ratings
Aggregate scores
Source	Rating
Metacritic	72/100
Review scores
Source	Rating
AllMusic	4/5 stars
Consequence of Sound	B
The Daily Telegraph	4/5 stars
The Independent	4/5 stars
Mojo	4/5 stars
NME	8/10
Pitchfork	7.8/10
Q	3/5 stars
Rolling Stone	3/5 stars
Under the Radar	8/10

Critical reception highlighted the album's musical style as a balance between modern electronica and a return to the duo's traditional sound. The Guardian noted the album's strength in delivering distinct "attention-deficit-disordered raver dynamics" and studio electronica, while AllMusic praised the record as a successful return to their signature "big beat roots".

The performance of "Go" in the charts propelled the Chemical Brothers back into the mainstream, with DJs such as Annie Mac including it on their playlists of the year. However, some critics believe it was "poppy", and not keeping to their roots. Despite this, the remainder of the album was well received, drawing particular attention to the 1990s sound of singles such as "I'll See You There" and "Taste of Honey".

== Track listing ==
Standard edition track listing
No.	Title	Writer(s)	Length
1.	"Sometimes I Feel So Deserted" (vocals by Daniel Pearce)	Tom Rowlands; Ed Simons; Moise Laporte; Kenneth Bobien	5:11
2.	"Go"	Rowlands; Simons; Kamaal Fareed	4:20
3.	"Under Neon Lights"	Rowlands; Simons; Annie Clark	4:26
4.	"EML Ritual"	Rowlands; Simons; Ali Love	5:20
5.	"I'll See You There"	Rowlands; Simons; Bill Bissett	4:20
6.	"Just Bang"	Rowlands; Simons	5:21
7.	"Reflexion"	Rowlands; Simons	6:29
8.	"Taste of Honey"	Rowlands; Simons	2:59
9.	"Born in the Echoes"	Rowlands; Simons; Cate Le Bon	3:26
10.	"Radiate"	Rowlands; Simons; Colin Stetson	4:39
11.	"Wide Open"	Rowlands; Simons; Beck Hansen	5:54
Total length:			52:25

Deluxe edition bonus tracks
No.	Title	Writer(s)	Length
12.	"Let Us Build a City"	Rowlands; Simons	4:34
13.	"Wo Ha"	Rowlands; Simons	4:30
14.	"Go" (extended mix)	Rowlands; Simons; Fareed	5:54
15.	"Reflexion" (extended mix)	Rowlands; Simons	7:19
Total length:			74:12

Japanese edition bonus tracks
No.	Title	Writer(s)	Length
12.	"Direct Buki"	Rowlands; Simons	6:56
13.	"Let Us Build a City"	Rowlands; Simons	4:34
14.	"Wo Ha"	Rowlands; Simons	4:30
15.	"Go" (extended mix)	Rowlands; Simons; Fareed	5:54
16.	"Reflexion" (extended mix)	Rowlands; Simons	7:19
Total length:			81:47

Japanese tour edition bonus disc
No.	Title	Writer(s)	Length
1.	"C-H-E-M-I-C-A-L"	Rowlands; Simons; Tony Butler; Garfield Baker; Byron Smith	6:13
2.	"Sometimes I Feel So Deserted" (Skream remix)		9:16
3.	"Sometimes I Feel So Deserted" (C2 Trigger RMX)		10:22
4.	"Go" (Edge of Control dub)		7:12
5.	"Go" (Claude VonStroke remix)		5:46
6.	"Go" (Special Request Basement remix)		6:44
7.	"Go" (Special Request Warehouse remix)		6:42
8.	"Wide Open" (Kölsch remix)		8:34
9.	"Wide Open" (Joe Goddard remix)		10:24
10.	"Wide Open" (By the Light of the Moon mix)		5:29
Total length:			76:42

== Personnel ==
The Chemical Brothers

- Tom Rowlands
- Ed Simons

Guest musicians

- Beck – vocals on "Wide Open"
- Cate Le Bon – vocals on "Born in the Echoes"
- Annie Clark – vocals on "Under Neon Lights"
- Ali Love – vocals on "EML Ritual"
- Q-Tip – vocals on "Go"
- Mark Ralph – bass on "Go"
- Mark Ryder – electronic drums, additional programming

== Charts ==
=== Weekly charts ===
Weekly chart performance for Born in the Echoes
Chart (2015)	Peak position
Australian Albums (ARIA)	5
Austrian Albums (Ö3 Austria)	10
Belgian Albums (Ultratop Flanders)	2
Belgian Albums (Ultratop Wallonia)	8
Dutch Albums (Album Top 100)	4
French Albums (SNEP)	29
German Albums (Offizielle Top 100)	10
Italian Albums (FIMI)	5
Irish Albums (IRMA)	4
New Zealand Albums (RMNZ)	10
Polish Albums (ZPAV)	41
Scottish Albums (Official Charts)	1
Spanish Albums (Promusicae)	10
Swiss Albums (Schweizer Hitparade)	2
UK Albums (Official Charts)	1
UK Dance Albums (Official Charts)	1
US Billboard 200	73
US Top Dance Albums (Billboard)	2

=== Year-end charts ===
Year-end chart performance for Born in the Echoes
Chart (2015)	Position
Belgian Albums (Ultratop Flanders)	162

== Certifications ==
Certifications for Born in the Echoes
Region	Certification	Certified units/sales
United Kingdom (BPI)	Silver	60,000^{‡}
^{‡} Sales+streaming figures based on certification alone.
