= Surrender (The Chemical Brothers album) =

1999 studio album

Studio album by the Chemical Brothers
- Released: 7 June 1999
- Recorded: 1998–1999
- Genre: Big beat; electronica; psychedelia
- Length: 58:58
- Label: Freestyle Dust; Virgin
- Producer: The Chemical Brothers

The Chemical Brothers chronology
Dig Your Own Hole (1997)	Surrender (1999)	Come with Us (2002)

Singles from Surrender
- 1. "Hey Boy Hey Girl" Released: 26 May 1999; 2. "Let Forever Be" Released: 23 July 1999; 3. "Out of Control" Released: 8 October 1999

Surrender is the third studio album by English electronic music duo the Chemical Brothers. It was released on 7 June 1999 in Japan and on 21 June in the United Kingdom. The album saw the duo exploring further various electronic styles, including house music. Four singles were released from the album: "Hey Boy Hey Girl", "Let Forever Be", "Out of Control", and "Music: Response". The album received critical acclaim.

== Content ==
Surrender features guest vocalists Noel Gallagher (Oasis), Hope Sandoval (Mazzy Star), Bernard Sumner (New Order) and Jonathan Donahue (Mercury Rev).

The album is more experimental than previous efforts. "Let Forever Be" pays homage to the Beatles, "Out of Control" is house influenced, and the breakout single "Hey Boy Hey Girl" has a rave sound.

Of "The Sunshine Underground", Tom Rowlands said: "I think the title came from those psychedelic poster books. We wanted it to sound like a live band finding its feet. It was influenced by a live version of 'Angel Sigh' on Spiritualized's Fucked Up Inside. It went through a lot of versions and this one's a composite of a lot of different takes. I love the mad bit in the middle when it goes into hyperspace and turns into this huge, gurning monster."

Many of the artists that the duo worked with on this album, they would work with again. The duo were quick to work again with Bobby Gillespie, who appears on the third track and third single "Out of Control", providing backing vocals: they remixed Gillespie's Primal Scream song "Swstk Ys" (as it was titled on the 1999 single release), which later appeared on the band's 2000 album Xtrmntr.

Surrender was the first Chemical Brothers album not to feature an appearance by Beth Orton, though she would appear on the following album Come with Us, on the song "The State We're In".

=== Album cover ===
The album and singles artwork were provided by London-based silkscreen artist and illustrator Kate Gibb, using screen prints of photographs found in the Hulton Picture Library. Gibb also went on to illustrate the Chemical Brothers albums Come with Us, We Are the Night, and Brotherhood. The cover image was a treatment of a photograph called Jesus Amongst the Fans taken by Richard Young at The Great British Music Festival at the Kensington Olympia in 1976. The "Jesus" in question was a music fan called William Jellett, who had adopted the divine moniker and was often seen dancing ecstatically at concerts across the UK from the 1960s to the 1990s. His "miracles" were to give dried fruit and nuts to strangers. Ed Simons said of the album cover in Q magazine, "We liked the idea of everyone else sitting down and being chilled out and just one person really getting it, like one of our gigs in the Midwest, actually". The magazine stated, however, in February 1999 the duo were confronted with a novel problem: they had, in Simons' words "about two weeks" to sort out an album cover, plan a live show, and do endless promotional duties in Japan. At one point, the image that was used as the single cover for "Out of Control", released later in 1999, was intended to be the album cover for Surrender.

== Release ==
Professional ratings
Review scores
Source	Rating
AllMusic	3/5 stars
Entertainment Weekly	B+
The Guardian	5/5 stars
Los Angeles Times	3/4 stars
Melody Maker	4.5/5 stars
NME	8/10
Pitchfork	9.0/10
Q	4/5 stars
Rolling Stone	4/5 stars
Select	4/5

The album was the band's second number one album. It was certified 2× Platinum by the BPI on 30 September 2005. A special tour edition of the album was released in Australia and New Zealand, which contained a second disc of B-sides from the album.

=== Singles ===
"Under the Influence" was released in June 1998 on vinyl as "Electronic Battle Weapon 3", exclusively for use for club DJs. "Hey Boy Hey Girl" was released on 26 May 1999 as the first official single from the album. It reached number 3 on the UK Singles Chart. The second single, "Let Forever Be", was released on 23 July 1999 and reached number 9 in the UK Singles Chart. This was followed by "Out of Control" which was released on 8 October 1999 and reached number 21 in the UK Singles Chart. "Music: Response" was released on 6 March 2000. It was not eligible for the UK charts because it contains five songs instead of three, which is required for qualification.

=== 20th Anniversary Edition ===
On 10 June 2019, the Chemical Brothers announced a 20th Anniversary special edition re-release of Surrender, featuring five unreleased "secret psychedelic mixes", a collection of b-sides and remixes, a DVD of restored promo videos, live footage of their performance at Glastonbury 2000, art prints, and a book. The set was released on 3CD and 4×LP on 22 November 2019.

== Legacy ==
The album cover appeared in Q magazine's 2001 list of "Q's 100 Best Record Covers of All Time". and is ranked number 981 in All-Time Top 1000 Albums (3rd. edition, 2000).

Leeds band the Sunshine Underground took their name from the sixth track on the album.

== Track listing ==
No.	Title	Writer(s)	Length
1.	"Music:Response"	Tom Rowlands; Ed Simons; Missy "Misdemeanor" Elliott; Tim Mosley; Aleesha Richards	5:20
2.	"Under the Influence"	Rowlands; Simons	4:16
3.	"Out of Control"	Rowlands; Simons; Bernard Sumner	7:20
4.	"Orange Wedge"	Rowlands; Simons	3:07
5.	"Let Forever Be"	Rowlands; Simons; Noel Gallagher	3:56
6.	"The Sunshine Underground"	Rowlands; Simons; James Asher	8:38
7.	"Asleep from Day"	Rowlands; Simons; Hope Sandoval	4:47
8.	"Got Glint?"	Rowlands; Simons; Bernard Fevre; Jacky Giordano	5:27
9.	"Hey Boy Hey Girl"	Rowlands; Simons; Gregory Wigfall; Richard Fowler; Charles Pettiford; Celite Evans; Jerry Bloodrock	4:51
10.	"Surrender"	Rowlands; Simons	4:30
11.	"Dream On" (contains a hidden track, which is a reprise of the same song)	Rowlands; Simons; Jonathan Donahue	6:47
Total length:			58:53

Australian limited edition bonus disc
No.	Title	Writer(s)	Length
1.	"Hey Boy Hey Girl" (Extended Version)	Rowlands; Simons; Wigfall; Fowler; Pettiford; Evens; Bloodrock	6:04
2.	"Flashback"	Rowlands; Simons	5:18
3.	"Power Move"	Rowlands; Simons	4:09
4.	"Out of Control" (Sasha Remix)	Rowlands; Simons; Sumner	7:19
Total length:			22:50

20th Anniversary Edition: Disc 2 (The Secret Psychedelic Mixes)
No.	Title	Length
1.	"Hey Boy Hey Girl" (Secret Psychedelic Mix)	5:32
2.	"Let Forever Be" (Secret Psychedelic Mix)	5:20
3.	"Out of Control" (21 Minutes of Madness Mix)	21:07
4.	"Flashback" (Secret Psychedelic Mix)	5:30
5.	"Dream On" (Secret Psychedelic Mix)	4:21

20th Anniversary Edition: Disc 3 (B-Sides & Remixes)
No.	Title	Length
1.	"Flashback"	5:20
2.	"Scale"	3:45
3.	"The Diamond Sky"	3:38
4.	"Studio K"	5:49
5.	"Power Move"	4:11
6.	"Enjoyed"	8:09
7.	"Electronic Battle Weapon 4" (Freak of the Week)	6:06
8.	"Out of Control" (Sasha Club Mix)	11:03
9.	"Music: Response" (Gentleman Thief Mix)	7:36
10.	"Music: Response" (Futureshock Main Response)	8:21
11.	"Hey Boy Hey Girl" (Soulwax Remix)	7:14
12.	"Hey Boy Hey Girl" (KiNK Remix)	5:55

Sample credits

- "Music:Response" contains samples of "Make It Hot", written by Missy "Misdemeanor" Elliott, Tim Mosley and Aleesha Richards, and performed by Nicole.
- "The Sunshine Underground" contains samples of "Asian Workshop", written and performed by James Asher.
- "Got Glint?" contains samples of "Earth Message", written by Bernard Fevre and Jacky Giordano, and performed by Bernard Fevre.
- "Hey Boy Hey Girl" contains samples of "The Roof Is on Fire", written by Gregory Wigfall, Richard Fowler, Charles Pettiford, Celite Evans and Jerry Bloodrock, and performed by Rock Master Scott & the Dynamic Three.

== Personnel ==
Personnel for Surrender are adapted from the album's liner notes.

The Chemical Brothers

- Tom Rowlands – production
- Ed Simons – production

Additional musicians

- Bernard Sumner – vocals and guitar on "Out of Control"
- Bobby Gillespie – additional vocals on "Out of Control"
- Noel Gallagher – vocals on "Let Forever Be"
- Hope Sandoval – vocals on "Asleep from Day"
- Jonathan Donahue – vocals, guitar, and piano on "Dream On"

Additional technical personnel

- Cheeky Paul – editing
- Steve Dub – engineering
- Jon Collyer – engineering (assistant)
- Ray Mascarenas – engineering (assistant)
- Mike Marsh – mastering

Design

- Blue Source – art direction
- The Chemical Brothers – art direction
- Kate Gibb – screen prints

== Charts ==
=== Weekly charts ===
Chart (1999–2000)	Peak position
Australian Albums (ARIA)	5
Austrian Albums (Ö3 Austria)	16
Belgian Albums (Ultratop Flanders)	6
Belgian Albums (Ultratop Wallonia)	14
Canadian Albums (Billboard)	8
Dutch Albums (Album Top 100)	14
Eurochart (Music & Media)	3
Finnish Albums (Suomen virallinen lista)	10
French Albums (SNEP)	8
German Albums (Offizielle Top 100)	7
Hungarian Albums (MAHASZ)	30
Irish Albums (IRMA)	4
Italian Albums (Musica e dischi)	6
Japanese Albums (Oricon)	14
New Zealand Albums (RMNZ)	7
Norwegian Albums (VG-lista)	7
Scottish Albums (Official Charts)	1
Spanish Albums (AFYVE)	14
Swedish Albums (Sverigetopplistan)	2
Swiss Albums (Schweizer Hitparade)	17
UK Albums (Official Charts)	1
US Billboard 200	32

Chart (2019)	Peak position
UK Dance Albums (Official Charts)	2

=== Year-end charts ===
Chart (1999)	Position
Belgian Albums (Ultratop Flanders)	67
Belgian Albums (Ultratop Wallonia)	94
German Albums (Offizielle Top 100)	96
UK Albums (OCC)	34

Chart (2000)	Position
Australian Albums (ARIA)	58
New Zealand Albums (RMNZ)	40
UK Albums (OCC)	95

== Certifications and sales ==
Region	Certification	Certified units/sales
Australia (ARIA)	2× Platinum	140,000^{‡}
Canada (Music Canada)	Platinum	100,000^{^}
France (SNEP)	Gold	100,000^{*}
Germany	—	120,000
Italy (FIMI)	Gold	80,000
Japan (RIAJ)	Gold	100,000^{^}
New Zealand (RMNZ)	2× Platinum	30,000^{^}
Spain (Promusicae)	Gold	70,000
United Kingdom (BPI)	2× Platinum	600,000^{^}
United States	—	402,000
Summaries
Europe (IFPI)	Platinum	1,000,000^{*}
Worldwide	—	2,300,000
^{*} Sales figures based on certification alone.^{^} Shipments figures based on certification alone.^{‡} Sales+streaming figures based on certification alone.

== Release history ==
Region	Release date	Label	Format	Catalogue
Japan	7 June 1999	Virgin Japan	CD	VJCP-68137
UK	21 June 1999	Freestyle Dust	CD	XDUSTCD4
UK	21 June 1999	Freestyle Dust	2×LP	XDUSTLP4
UK	21 June 1999	Freestyle Dust	MC	XDUSTMC4
UK	21 June 1999	Freestyle Dust	MD	XDUSTMD4
US	22 June 1999	Astralwerks	CD	ASW 47610-2
US	22 June 1999	Astralwerks	2×LP	ASW 47610-1
