= Come with Us =

2002 studio album by the Chemical Brothers

Studio album by the Chemical Brothers
- Released: 28 January 2002
- Recorded: 2000–2001
- Genre: Electronica
- Length: 54:48
- Label: Virgin; Freestyle Dust
- Producer: The Chemical Brothers

The Chemical Brothers chronology
Surrender (1999)	Come with Us (2002)	Singles 93–03 (2003)

Singles from Come with Us
- 1. "It Began in Afrika" Released: 10 September 2001; 2. "Star Guitar" Released: 14 January 2002; 3. "Come with Us/The Test" Released: 22 April 2002

Come with Us is the fourth studio album by English electronic music duo the Chemical Brothers, released in January 2002 by record labels Virgin and Freestyle Dust in the UK and Astralwerks and Ultra in the US. It features Richard Ashcroft (ex-the Verve) and Beth Orton as guest vocalists.

The album debuted at number one on the UK Albums Chart. It was certified Gold by the BPI on 1 February 2002.

== Background ==
The Chemical Brothers' second and third albums, Dig Your Own Hole and Surrender, brought them international fame. The band had a worldwide tour for Surrender beginning in 1999, continuing until summer 2000, when they played festivals such as Glastonbury Festival and Creamfields.

Following this, the duo created a new track, premiered in December 2000, when they supported U2. Tom Rowlands seemed to initially have mixed feelings about the song, saying it had "quite a lot of percussion, big, sweeping sort of stuff. Live conga playing, quite spaced out. It's like Body & Soul, but really, really hard and twisted, it's like high-impact, full-on, but with more organic sounds, and quite intense, without the good vibe." The track was popular with fans, however, and was eventually issued as the white label release "Electronic Battle Weapon 5", in June 2001.

== Recording ==
Work on a new album began in 2000, when it was initially titled Chemical Four. The record explores new gear, such as the Parker MIDI Fly guitar. When asked if it would be a "back-to-roots" album, following their change in style with Surrender, Ed Simons said, "The first three or four numbers do remind me of those days when we were so excited about putting together little grooves and beats – that whole cut-up era of hip hop. We had Grand Wizard Theodore DJing at our gigs then. Like that scratch segment in 'Afrika', those tiny segments where it sounds like a DJ cutting in, those sorts of things used to really excite us. But some of the music is totally removed from that. 'Hoops' is totally different than anything we – or anyone – have ever done". The album took eighteen months to record.

In making the record, the string arpeggios and the hard MIDI notes came first. "Then it was about finding the right sounds and building from that point", says Simons. The album's drum programming started with doing the snare sound, then a kick, and a bit of "high-end ssshhhhhh". The duo said they "took the actual individual drum sounds, then wrote the chords. We always sample tiny fragments of sound as a starting point. But there were more definite tunes and ideas and melodies from the start of this album than before". They also experimented with Emagic Logic Audio, which proved successful in the album's production as it never crashed, unlike Steinberg Cubase, which the band had used previously.

== Release ==
During the month of release, the Chemical Brothers received retrospective respect from publications such as Muzik magazine. Promotion for the album started in September 2001, and concluded in November 2002.

Come with Us was released on 28 January 2002 in the UK, following the single "It Began in Afrika", a variation of the band's "Electronic Battle Weapon 5", which was issued in September 2001 and appears on the album, as well as the release of the single "Star Guitar". The tracks proved successful, both reaching number 8 on the UK Singles Chart. The album itself entered at number 1, being the band's third consecutive number 1 album. As well as these two singles, the track "Galaxy Bounce", popularized on the Lara Croft: Tomb Raider soundtrack in the summer of 2001, also appears on the album,

In its opening week on the Billboard chart, the record sold 30,000 copies.

=== Singles and EPs ===
"It Began in Afrika" was released in June 2001 as "Electronic Battle Weapon 5", exclusively for DJs to test in clubs. It was officially issued as the first single on 10 September 2001 and reached number eight on the UK Singles Chart. The version on the album is a six-minute edit that segues into "Galaxy Bounce". "Star Guitar" was released on 14 January 2002 and reached number eight on the UK Singles Chart. "Come with Us" and "The Test" were released as a double A-side single on 22 April 2002, reaching number 14 on the UK Singles Chart. In Japan, the names in the title of the single were reversed. "Hoops" was released on 1 June 2002 in remixed form as "Electronic Battle Weapon 6", exclusively for DJs to test in clubs.

At the time of their Japan tour, the tie-in extended play titled Come with Us/Japan Only EP was released exclusively in that country, on 17 July 2002. The AmericanEP was issued exclusively to in the United States on 19 November 2002, in promotion of the North Amerika tour. "Come with Us" and "The Test" were also issued as separate promo singles in addition to the retail double A-side.

== Reception ==
Professional ratings
Aggregate scores
Source	Rating
Metacritic	72/100
Review scores
Source	Rating
AllMusic	4/5 stars
Alternative Press	7/10
Entertainment Weekly	B
Pitchfork	6.2/10
PopMatters	8/10
Q	3/5 stars
Rolling Stone	4/5 stars
Slant	4/5 stars
Spin	9/10
Uncut	2.5/5 stars
The Rolling Stone Album Guide	2.5/5 stars

Initial critical response to Come with Us was generally positive. At Metacritic, which assigns a normalised rating out of 100 to reviews from mainstream critics, the album has received an average score of 72, based on 23 reviews. Kludge included it on their list of best albums of 2002.

Andy Puleston of the BBC said that "years ago Tom and Ed assured us 'the brother's gonna work it out'. If you've ever felt that they had yet to make good on this promise then, as far as Come with Us is concerned there was never a truer word spoken." His review also acknowledged the success of "It Began in Afrika", saying that by "removing shrubs, laying concrete and generally paving the way for this album, "Afrika" conquered Ibiza, Notting Hill Carnival and contrived a craving amongst those with an affinity for a big, bouncy kick drum."

AllMusic said that "After forgetting the key on 1999's Surrender amidst handling all of the celebrity guests, they got back to business with Come with Us", and that "from the vocal sample introducing the opener ("behold...they're coming back"), it's clear Rowlands and Simons know the importance of this fourth album, and it detonates like a bomb blast, as though the duo knew that Come with Us had to be bigger and badder than all the bombastic breaks they'd dropped in the past."

Following the album's release, the band embarked on two tours, the Go with Them tour and the North Amerika tour.

== Track listing ==
Come with Us track listing
No.	Title	Writer(s)	Length
1.	"Come with Us"	Tom Rowlands; Ed Simons; Tony Rallo; Copperman; Peter Krissen; David Fairstein	4:58
2.	"It Began in Afrika"	Rowlands; Simons; Jim Ingram	6:16
3.	"Galaxy Bounce"	Rowlands; Simons	3:28
4.	"Star Guitar"	Rowlands; Simons	6:27
5.	"Hoops"	Rowlands; Simons	6:32
6.	"My Elastic Eye"	Rowlands; Simons; Bernard Estardy	3:42
7.	"The State We're In" (featuring Beth Orton)	Rowlands; Simons	6:27
8.	"Denmark"	Rowlands; Simons	5:07
9.	"Pioneer Skies"	Rowlands; Simons; Mathias Camison	4:05
10.	"The Test" (featuring Richard Ashcroft)	Rowlands; Simons; Richard Ashcroft; Czeslaw Niemen	7:46
Total length:			54:48

Notes

- As with all other albums by the Chemical Brothers, some of the tracks segue into the next. These are 2 into 3 and 7 into 8.
- The Japanese edition includes a music video for "Star Guitar" and a keyring tag.

== Personnel ==
- The Chemical Brothers – production

=== Additional musicians ===
- Jared Faber – drums ("Come with Us")
- Steve Dub – engineering, additional guitar
- Greg Fleming – assistance
- Kate Gibb – artwork
- Beverley Skeete – vocals on "Star Guitar"
- Richard Ashcroft – vocals on "The Test"
- Beth Orton – vocals on "The State We're In"
- Shovell – percussion on "It Began in Afrika"

== Charts ==
=== Weekly charts ===
Weekly chart performance for Come with Us
Chart (2002)	Peak position
Australian Albums (ARIA)	1
Austrian Albums (Ö3 Austria)	16
Belgian Albums (Ultratop Flanders)	5
Belgian Albums (Ultratop Wallonia)	11
Canadian Albums (Billboard)	10
Danish Albums (Hitlisten)	37
Dutch Albums (Album Top 100)	30
Finnish Albums (Suomen virallinen lista)	11
French Albums (SNEP)	4
German Albums (Offizielle Top 100)	18
Irish Albums (IRMA)	1
Italian Albums (FIMI)	3
New Zealand Albums (RMNZ)	1
Norwegian Albums (VG-lista)	22
Scottish Albums (OCC)	1
Spanish Albums (AFYVE)	11
Swedish Albums (Sverigetopplistan)	21
Swiss Albums (Schweizer Hitparade)	12
UK Albums (OCC)	1
US Billboard 200	32
US Top Dance Albums (Billboard)	1

=== Year-end charts ===
Year-end chart performance for Come with Us
Chart (2002)	Position
Australian Albums (ARIA)	57
Canadian Alternative Albums (Nielsen SoundScan)	77
New Zealand Albums (RMNZ)	48
UK Albums (OCC)	104

== Certifications ==
Certifications for Come with Us
Region	Certification	Certified units/sales
Australia (ARIA)	Gold	35,000^{^}
Canada (Music Canada)	Gold	50,000^{^}
Japan (RIAJ)	Gold	100,000^{^}
New Zealand (RMNZ)	Gold	7,500^{^}
United Kingdom (BPI)	Gold	217,000
^{^} Shipments figures based on certification alone.

== Release history ==
Release history and formats for Come with Us
Region	Release date	Label	Format	Catalogue
Japan	21 January 2002	Virgin Japan	CD	VJCP-68367
United Kingdom	28 January 2002	Freestyle Dust	CD	XDUSTCD5
United Kingdom	28 January 2002	Freestyle Dust	CD	XDUSTCDX5
United Kingdom	28 January 2002	Freestyle Dust	2×LP	XDUSTLP5
United Kingdom	28 January 2002	Freestyle Dust	MC	XDUSTMC5
United States	29 January 2002	Astralwerks	CD	ASW11682-2
United States	29 January 2002	Astralwerks	CD	ASW11895-2
United States	29 January 2002	Astralwerks	2×LP	ASW11682-1
Japan	29 March 2002	Virgin Japan	CD	VJCP-68408
