= Setting Sun (The Chemical Brothers song) =

1996 single by the Chemical Brothers

Single by the Chemical Brothers

from the album Dig Your Own Hole
- B-side: "Buzz Tracks"
- Released: 30 September 1996
- Recorded: February 1996
- Studio: Orinoco (South London, England)
- Genre: Experimental; dance-rock; big beat; psychedelia; electronica
- Length: 5:23
- Label: Freestyle Dust; Virgin
- Songwriters: Tom Rowlands; Ed Simons; Noel Gallagher
- Producer: The Chemical Brothers

The Chemical Brothers singles chronology
"Life Is Sweet" (1995)	"Setting Sun" (1996)	"Block Rockin' Beats" (1997)

Noel Gallagher singles chronology
"Setting Sun" (1996)	"Let Forever Be" (1999)

Music video
- "Setting Sun" on YouTube

"Setting Sun" is a song by English electronic music duo the Chemical Brothers featuring vocals from Noel Gallagher of Britpop band Oasis, who also co-wrote the track with duo members Tom Rowlands and Ed Simons. It was released on 30 September 1996 by Freestyle Dust and Virgin Records, as the lead single from the Chemical Brothers' second album, Dig Your Own Hole (1997).

Despite receiving little airplay in the United Kingdom, "Setting Sun" sold 99,000 copies during its first week of release and debuted at number one on the UK Singles Chart in October 1996. Outside the UK, the song entered the top 10 in Finland, Ireland and Sweden. The music video was directed by Nic Goffey and Dominic Hawley and filmed in London. The American magazine Rolling Stone included "Setting Sun" in their list of the "200 Greatest Dance Songs of All Time" in 2022.

== Background ==
The Chemical Brothers received word that Noel Gallagher wanted to produce a track with the duo after he heard "Life Is Sweet", a collaboration the duo had made with Tim Burgess of the Charlatans.

At the end of February 1996, they went to Orinoco Studios to record the track. According to Ed Simons of the duo, Gallagher "phoned us up, and said, 'Oh, I'll come down now and do it.' We said, 'Hold on a bit', and sent him a tape of this track, 'Mark One', which we thought might appeal because it had that Beatley feel to it. It took us quite some time to do 'Mark One', but 'Setting Sun' itself was a day in the studio with him, then us mixing for a while, and it was in the can."

Gallagher said that recording the vocals was quick, and that he had to leave early, to watch Manchester City F.C. play a Third Division football game. He said that after its quick recording, "I didn't think anything more of it until I heard the rough mix ... In the nineties, you'd meet someone backstage and say, 'I should be singing on your next single.' They'd send it to you and you'd do it. And the next thing it's fucking Number 1. Them's the days." The song took one day to mix.

Tom Ewing of Freaky Trigger contextualised the collaboration: "The Chemical Brothers had just supported Oasis at Knebworth, and like that band they were tied up with Britpop but also not completely of it. They were remixers by appointment to the new pop stars, and their sweat-drenched club residencies provided Britpop’s hedonistic soap operatics with an apt backbeat. But by now Britpop is falling apart in a bloody-nosed mess – 'Setting Sun' the perfect soundtrack, really – and the Chemical Brothers' main context is coming to the fore: big beat."

== Release ==
According to biographer Robin Turner, the song was a "big deal" in autumn 1996, with anticipation rising in the weeks before its release. Sam Taylor of The Observer noted that, in the weeks before "Setting Sun" was released to radio, Chris Evans hyped the song throughout his BBC Radio 1 breakfast show. "He hadn't actually heard it, but figured that anything featuring the great Oasis songwriter was bound to be wonderful. Then he played it, and what sounded like a fire alarm on a crashing 747 erupted from the nation's transistors. Evans took the record off, and shakily announced: 'I don't think that was a very suitable record for this time of the morning'." Taylor said that "Anything that gives Chris Evans a nasty shock has to be regarded as a good thing", while Tom Rowlands of the duo told NME that "It takes a lot of hard work to get a record featuring Noel Gallagher pulled from daytime Radio 1."

Chart commentator James Masterton wrote that Gallagher's presence on the song was responsible for the song's "phenomenal popularity" on release, adding: "Released after a great deal of anticipation it could really do no other than shoot straight to the top of the charts, incredibly the 11th single this year to do so." The Daily Telegraph writer Sheryl Garratt writes that although it became the Chemical Brothers' first UK number one single, "it stayed in the top slot for only a week. Gallagher's voice was barely recognisable amid the dense beats, and radio found it almost impossible to play." Rowlands reflected: "I liked the fact that we made such a noisy, offensive record with [Gallagher]". Turner writes: "It was – and remains – utterly uncompromised, a cyclone of a track that sat as a beacon of strangeness at the top of the UK Singles Chart between a jaunty one-hit wonder (Deep Blue Something's 'Breakfast at Tiffany's') and a mawkish cover version (Boyzone's take on Bee Gees' 'Words')."

Gallagher also commented on its success; reflecting on it in 2023, he said: "Hearing that first version on cassette, I would never in a million years have thought it would get to Number 1. Fucking no chance. But the fact that it knocked off that piece of shit 'Breakfast at Tiffany's', which seemed to have been at Number 1 for eleven years, made it all the more sweet. And the fact that Radio 1 DJ Chris Evans refused to play it was hilarious. I remember him being sniffy about it and thinking, 'We are onto something here'."

== Critical reception ==
Upon release, "Setting Sun" was critically acclaimed by music critics. J. D. Considine from The Baltimore Sun complimented the "ear-catching sounds" of "shrieking klaxons and braying trumpets", naming it one of three best songs from Dig Your Own Hole. He felt that songs like "Setting Sun" "come on like mini-amusement parks, offering so many sonic thrills that you can't help but want to ride the groove again." Daina Darzin from Cash Box named it Pick of the Week, adding, "Techno, synthcore, dance, industrial, whatever you wanna call it, this is the single du jour—a downright amazing, explosive, whirling, get-your-feet-moving rush of a thing that you're guaranteed to play, like, 37 times in a row after hearing it for the first time."

Caroline Sullivan from The Guardian gave it a top score of five out of five and named it Single of the Week, writing, "The Brothers' disjointed breakbeats, sirens and trapped-in-a-lift ambiance are glorious foils for Gallagher, who seems to be having an out-of-body experience. It's hallucinatory in the manner of one of Led Zeppelin's heaviest moments, where sonic firepower and grubby sexiness induced sensory overload." Taylor Parkes from Melody Maker said, "The one with Noel Gallagher singing on it, yes. Not quite the meeting of the minds many will be expecting...but, as soon as it finished, I played it again. 'Setting Sun' is the beat from The Beatles' 'Tomorrow Never Knows' cranked up and flooded with the messiest noise in techno, with Noel's usual dippy doggerel scribbled through the middle. The whole thing takes the slip road into beat-less Babel a couple of times to catch its breath before diving right back into the mêlée, riotous and rejuvenated." Sally Stratton from Music & Media noted the track's "wails and explosions". David Fricke from Rolling Stone remarked its "vertiginous Beatlemania".

== Music video ==
The accompanying music video for the song was directed by Nic Goffey and Dominic Hawley. It was shot on location at the abandoned Crystal Palace Subway station in London and features artist Lexi Strauss. In the video, it shows the prospect of a rave party through the eyes of a bewildered young woman. It can be seen the woman chasing a personification of her nightmare through the party. The video mixes a disturbing psychological confusion with moments of humoristic imagination (for example, the woman sees police dancing breakdance). The Chemical Brothers briefly appear, leaving the party with their record cases. According to Spin writer Ed Weisbard, MTV cited the "Setting Sun" video as the inspiration for announcing "a format shift away from alternative rock and toward electronica".

== Impact and legacy ==
In December 1996, Melody Maker ranked "Setting Sun" number 25 in their list of "Singles of the Year". In 2010, Pitchfork ranked it number 43 in their list of the "Top 200 Tracks of the 1990s". In 2004, The Guardian called it, alongside Underworld's "Born Slippy .NUXX", the "most experimental and sonically extreme hit [single] of the 90s", and in 2020, they ranked it number 49 on their list of "The 100 Greatest UK No 1 Singles". In 2017, BuzzFeed ranked "Setting Sun" number 67 in their list of "The 101 Greatest Dance Songs of the '90s". In 2022, Rolling Stone ranked it number 82 on their list of the "200 Greatest Dance Songs of All Time". Earlier, the magazine called it "the best single of 1996, hands down." Freaky Trigger's Tom Ewing ranked it at number 64 on his list, the "Top 100 Singles of the 1990s".

Marc Hogan wrote of the track in the Pitchfork list: "With rave sirens, screeching guitars, and a buzzing midsection where the bottom drops out like you're going over a dip on the freeway, 'Setting Sun' summons up the Fab Four's trailblazing spirit better than Oasis ever could alone-- though Noel Gallagher's hallucinatory vocal sure helps. Acid house met acid rock, and for a moment it sounded like tomorrow had come today." Ewing calls it "the noisiest No.1 of the 90s and the best record of [Gallagher's] career", adding that the singer's lyrics "are just flotsam to be sucked under by the raging spume of drum crash, siren and divebomb electro-howl the Brothers conjure up." He called the song "the five minutes when the man who ended up Britain’s biggest star of the decade produced a record that sounded like he deserved it." In 2020, The Guardian's Ben Beaumont-Thomas wrote that the song "still sounds extreme. Lighting up that breakbeat and demonically heaving harmonium riffs are rockets and catherine wheels of wild sound, with Noel Gallagher sounding as if he’s being dragged out of sanity."

According to Simons in 1997, Simon Le Bon of Duran Duran told him that "Setting Sun" was "the best thing he'd heard in the 1990s." That same year, Andy Gill of Q described the Chemical Brothers as "genre matchmakers who've arguably done more than anyone to introduce rock fans to dance, and vice-versa — never more so than when they collaborated with Noel Gallagher on the chart-topping, screaming-dizbuster noise of 'Setting Sun'."

== Track listings ==
UK and US CD and cassette single, Australian CD single
No.	Title	Length
1.	"Setting Sun" (full length version)	5:23
2.	"Setting Sun" (radio edit)	4:00
3.	"Buzz Tracks"	4:11
4.	"Setting Sun" (instrumental)	7:01

UK and US 12-inch single
No.	Title	Length
1.	"Setting Sun" (full length version)	5:21
2.	"Setting Sun" (instrumental)	7:00
3.	"Buzz Tracks"	4:09

European CD single
No.	Title	Length
1.	"Setting Sun" (radio edit)	3:59
2.	"Setting Sun" (full length version)	5:21

Japanese CD single
No.	Title	Length
1.	"Setting Sun" (full length version)	5:21
2.	"Setting Sun" (radio edit)	4:00
3.	"Buzz Tracks"	4:09
4.	"Setting Sun" (instrumental)	7:00
5.	"Loops of Fury"	4:41
6.	"Chemical Beats" (Dave Clarke remix)	5:04

== Credits and personnel ==
Credits are lifted from the Dig Your Own Hole album booklet.

Studios

- Recorded at Orinoco Studios (South London, England)
- Mastered at The Exchange (London, England)

Personnel

- The Chemical Brothers – production
  - Tom Rowlands – writing
  - Ed Simons – writing
- Noel Gallagher – writing, vocals
- Jon Dee – engineering
- Mike Marsh – mastering

== Charts ==
=== Weekly charts ===
Chart (1996–1997)	Peak position
Australia (ARIA)	27
Europe (Eurochart Hot 100)	13
Europe (European Dance Radio)	13
Finland (Suomen virallinen lista)	5
Iceland (Íslenski Listinn Topp 40)	16
Ireland (IRMA)	6
Israel (Israeli Singles Chart)	21
Italy (Musica e dischi)	20
Netherlands (Dutch Top 40 Tipparade)	16
Netherlands (Single Top 100 Tipparade)	4
Norway (VG-lista)	17
Scottish Singles Sales (Official Charts)	2
Sweden (Sverigetopplistan)	5
UK Singles (Official Charts)	1
UK Airplay (Music Week)	27
US Billboard Hot 100	80

=== Year-end charts ===
Chart (1996)	Position
Sweden (Topplistan)	84
UK Singles (OCC)	61

== Certifications ==
Region	Certification	Certified units/sales
United Kingdom (BPI)	Silver	200,000^{^}
^{^} Shipments figures based on certification alone.

== Release history ==
Region	Date	Format(s)	Label(s)	Ref.
United Kingdom	30 September 1996	12-inch vinyl	Freestyle Dust; Virgin	
Japan	27 November 1996	CD	Freestyle Dust; Virgin	
