= Fourteenth Century Sky =

EP by The Dust Brothers
- Released: January 1994
- Recorded: 1993
- Genre: Big beat
- Length: 23:43
- Label: Junior Boys Own
- Producer: The Dust Brothers

The Dust Brothers chronology
Song to the Siren (1992)	Fourteenth Century Sky (1994)	My Mercury Mouth E.P (1994)

Fourteenth Century Sky is an extended play (EP) by English big beat duo The Chemical Brothers, their second release under the name The Dust Brothers. The EP contains "Chemical Beats" and "One Too Many Mornings", later released on the Brothers' debut album Exit Planet Dust. There are two different versions of the EP in terms of design, one has a predominantly black background as in the picture, the other is predominantly white and appears to be somewhat rarer.

"One Too Many Mornings" found fame in 2001 after appearing on several chillout compilation albums. The version of "Chemical Beats" is the full-length version, with an extended intro. The full version of the song wasn't included on Exit Planet Dust due to an uncleared vocal sample and has not been available since. The sample was "take this, brother, may it serve you well," from the Beatles' song "Revolution 9".

== Track listings ==
All tracks are written by The Dust Brothers

Side one
No.	Title	Length
1.	"Chemical Beats"	5:37
2.	"One Too Many Mornings"	4:10

Side two
No.	Title	Length
3.	"Dope Coil"	5:02
4.	"Her Jazz"	8:35
Total length:		23:43
