= Star Guitar =

2002 single by the Chemical Brothers

Single by the Chemical Brothers

from the album Come with Us
- B-side: "Base 6"
- Released: 14 January 2002
- Studio: Miloco (South London, England)
- Genre: Post-disco
- Length: 3:59 (edit)
- Label: Freestyle Dust; Virgin
- Songwriters: Tom Rowlands; Ed Simons
- Producer: The Chemical Brothers

The Chemical Brothers singles chronology
"It Began in Afrika" (2001)	"Star Guitar" (2002)	"Come with Us" / "The Test" (2002)

Music video
- "Star Guitar" on YouTube

"Star Guitar" is a song by English electronic music duo the Chemical Brothers, released as the second single from their fourth album, Come with Us (2002). It reached number eight on the UK Singles Chart, number two on the US Billboard Dance Club Play chart, and number one on the UK Dance Chart.

== Structure ==
"Star Guitar" is 127 beats per minute and in the key of F major. It contains a four measure-long acoustic guitar sample from the beginning of the David Bowie song, "Starman", hence the name, "Star Guitar". This sample is repeated throughout the majority of the track, with various musical elements playing over it as a main theme. The song also contains an electronic sample of "Fly to Venus" by Electronic System.

== Reception ==
Upon the release of Come with Us, Nathan Rooney of Pitchfork, referring to its placement on the album, said the song was the "Chemical Brothers deviat[ing] from their role as Big Beat deities" and "it's slight, but not nearly as vapid as "Hoops," the song that follows it." Scott Plagenhoef, also of Pitchfork Media, originally said the track "doesn't leave much of an impression, but may as well be Beethoven's 9th next to the Richard Ashcroft collaboration "The Test". However, he later changed his opinion, saying it is "a fantastic track I grossly underrated here at the time" and that it was among the "best of the group's work [in the 2000s]".

After noting the album is "steeped in retro-synth glory", Sal Cinquemani of Slant Magazine said "Star Guitar" is "a crisp post-disco work-out featuring bristling guitars and a Giorgio Moroder-style synth-bass. Pat Blashall of Rolling Stone referred to the song as "slowly blooming", positively noting that within the track, "a dreamy melody hatches from an array of Ritalin beats, is evidence of a band that is increasingly drawn to disorientingly lush tunes rather than to mere adrenaline anthems."

In 2006, Slant Magazine ranked the song at number 23 in their list of the "100 Greatest Dance Songs", and, in 2010, ranked it at number 32 in their list of "The 250 Best Singles of the 2000s". In 2009, Pitchfork ranked the song at number 398 in their list of The Top 500 Tracks of the 2000s. Fatboy Slim revealed in 2012 that he had been asked to remix the song upon its release, but turned down the offer owing to his opinion that the song could not be improved.

== Music video ==
The music video, made by Michel Gondry, features a continuous shot filmed from the window of a speeding train passing through towns and the countryside. However, the buildings and objects passing by appear exactly in time with the various musical elements of the song, including the beats. The video is based on DV footage Gondry shot while on holiday in France; the train ride between Nîmes and Valence was shot ten different times during the day to get different light gradients. The Pont du Robinet as well as Pierrelatte's station can be seen and the cities of Miramas and Avignon. Gondry had experimented with a different version of the same effect in his video for Daft Punk's "Around the World", where he had represented each element of the music with a dancer.

Gondry plotted out the synchronization of the song on graph paper before creating the video, eventually "modelling" the scenery with oranges, forks, tapes, books, glasses and tennis shoes.

== Track listings ==
UK and Australian CD single; US 12-inch single

1. "Star Guitar" (edit)
2. "Base 6"
3. "Star Guitar" (Pete Heller's expanded mix)

UK 12-inch single

A. "Star Guitar"
B. "Star Guitar" (Pete Heller's expanded mix)

UK DVD single

1. "Star Guitar" (video)
2. "Star Guitar" (audio)
3. "Star Guitar" (Pete Heller's 303 dub audio)

European CD single

1. "Star Guitar" (edit)
2. "Base 6"

US, Canadian, and Japanese CD single

1. "Star Guitar" (edit)
2. "Star Guitar"
3. "Star Guitar" (Pete Heller's expanded mix)
4. "Star Guitar" (Pete Heller's 303 dub)
5. "Base 6"

== Credits and personnel ==
Credits are lifted from the Come with Us album booklet.

Studios

- Recorded at Miloco Studios (South London, England)
- Edited in the Miloco Studios basement
- Mastered at The Exchange (London, England)

Personnel

- The Chemical Brothers – production
  - Tom Rowlands – writing
  - Ed Simons – writing
- Steve Dub – engineering
- Greg Fleming – assistant engineering
- Cheeky Paul – editing
- Mike Marsh – mastering

== Charts ==
=== Weekly charts ===
Chart (2002)	Peak position
Australia (ARIA)	52
Belgium (Ultratip Bubbling Under Flanders)	8
Belgium (Ultratip Bubbling Under Wallonia)	10
Belgium Dance (Ultratop Flanders)	19
Canada (Nielsen SoundScan)	3
Europe (Eurochart Hot 100)	37
Finland (Suomen virallinen lista)	15
Germany (GfK)	98
Ireland (IRMA)	10
Ireland Dance (IRMA)	1
Italy (FIMI)	22
Netherlands (Single Top 100)	76
New Zealand (Recorded Music NZ)	49
Scottish Singles Sales (Official Charts)	8
Spain (Promusicae)	1
Sweden (Sverigetopplistan)	42
Switzerland (Schweizer Hitparade)	73
UK Singles (Official Charts)	8
UK Dance (Official Charts)	1
US Dance Club Songs (Billboard)	2
US Dance Singles Sales (Billboard)	2

=== Year-end charts ===
Chart (2002)	Position
Canada (Nielsen SoundScan)	76
UK Singles (OCC)	194

== Release history ==
Region	Release date	Format(s)	Label(s)	Catalogue	Ref(s).
United Kingdom	14 January 2002	CD	Freestyle Dust; Virgin	CHEMSD14	
United Kingdom	14 January 2002	12-inch vinyl	Freestyle Dust; Virgin	CHEMST14	
United Kingdom	14 January 2002	DVD	Freestyle Dust; Virgin	CHEMSDVD14	
Australia	14 January 2002	CD	Freestyle Dust; Virgin	CHEMSD14	
United States	15 January 2002	CD	Astralwerks	ASW 38812	
Japan	17 January 2002	CD	Virgin	VJCP-12153	
United States	29 January 2002	12-inch vinyl	Astralwerks	ASW 38812	

== Cover versions ==
Japanese electro musician Shin'ichi Ōsawa released a cover of "Star Guitar" in 2008.

== See also ==
- List of post-disco artists and songs
