= Block Rockin' Beats =

1997 single by the Chemical Brothers

Single by the Chemical Brothers

from the album Dig Your Own Hole
- B-side: "Morning Lemon"
- Released: 24 March 1997
- Studio: Orinoco (South London, England)
- Genre: Techno; hip-hop; indie rock; breakbeat
- Length: 5:14 (album version); 5:00 (single version); 3:24 (radio edit)
- Label: Freestyle Dust; Virgin
- Songwriters: Tom Rowlands; Ed Simons; Jesse Weaver
- Producer: The Chemical Brothers

The Chemical Brothers singles chronology
"Setting Sun" (1996)	"Block Rockin' Beats" (1997)	"Elektrobank" (1997)

Alternate covers
- CD2

Music video
- "Block Rockin' Beats" on YouTube

"Block Rockin' Beats" is a song recorded and produced by British big beat duo the Chemical Brothers. Released in March 1997 by Freestyle Dust and Virgin Records as the second single and opening track from their second studio album, Dig Your Own Hole (1997), it topped the UK Singles Chart and peaked at number 40 on the US Billboard Modern Rock Tracks chart. It received a Grammy Award for Best Rock Instrumental Performance. The accompanying music video was directed by Nic Goffey and Dominic Hawley.

Two different edits of "Block Rockin' Beats" exist: the version found on Dig Your Own Hole has an intro, while the version released as a single begins with the bass line. The B-side "Morning Lemon" is also available on the second disc of the limited edition Singles 93–03. In 2005, Blender magazine included the song on their ranking of the "Greatest Songs Since You Were Born", while LA Weekly ranked it number 14 in their list of "The 20 Best Dance Music Tracks in History" in 2015.

== Samples ==
The drums are sampled from "Changes" by Bernard Purdie. The vocals, "Back with another one of those block rockin' beats" is a sample from American rapper Schoolly D's 1989 song "Gucci Again".

Another reviewer wrote that the track uses (without compensation) the bass line from the track "Coup" by 23 Skidoo. The opening bass riff resembles the intro from the Pink Floyd song "Let There Be More Light", while the bass sound has been sampled from The Crusaders' song "The Well's Gone Dry".

"Morning Lemon" opens with a vocal sample of a man singing "Morning lemon", and ends with a sample of Ice Cube saying "Take that, motherfuckers!" (from his song "What They Hittin' Foe?").

== Critical reception ==
NME made the song their single of the week. Stephen Thomas Erlewine from AllMusic noted the "slamming cacophony" of the song, "where hip-hop meets hardcore techno, complete with a Schoolly D sample and an elastic bass riff." He added, "Everything is going on at once in 'Block Rockin' Beats', and it sets the pace for the rest of the record, where songs and styles blur into a continuous kaleidoscope of sound." Larry Flick from Billboard magazine described it as a "genre-spanning revelation", and stated that "after one spin, you'll be chanting the hook for hours, and the blend of scratchy funk beats and acidic keyboards are sure to get the body moving." The Daily Vault's Sean McCarthy commented, "Beginning with a funky bass beat, the music explodes with a blast of sonic fury. The music itself is fit for dance halls, but what's striking about the leadoff track is the confidence that Simmons and Rowlands display". David Browne from Entertainment Weekly remarked the "burning-down-the-disco break beats".

Irish Evening Herald said tracks like this are based on infectious melodies "that stick in your head for ages." Sally Stratton from Music & Media noted its "frenetic pace". British magazine Music Week gave it a score of four out of five, adding that "this chunky techno/hip hop sound clash finds the Chemicals at their most in-your-face". Gerald Martinez from New Sunday Times viewed it as "thunderous". A reviewer from People Magazine said that on the "cacophonous, turbo-charged" track, the duo "borrow heavily from hip hop’s cut-and-paste production methods". David Fricke from Rolling Stone named "Block Rockin' Beats" the "Whole Lotta Love" of Dance Floor '97. Terri Sutton from Salon described it as "incorrigible", with its "frantic faux guitar interplay, funky bass and underwater detonations." Sunday Mirror commented, "The dance kings follow up the Noel Gallagher flavoured No 1 'Setting Sun' with an even noisier mess of thumping drums and wailing guitars. No celebrity vocals this time but who needs them."

== Chart performance ==
"Block Rockin' Beats" peaked at number one during its first week on the UK Singles Chart on 30 March 1997. It spent one week at the top position before dropping to number eight the following week. The single also reached number two on the UK Dance Singles Chart and entered the top 10 in Finland, Iceland, and Ireland. Additionally, it was a top-20 hit in Norway and Sweden, as well as on the Eurochart Hot 100, where it peaked at number 12 in April 1997.

In Australia and New Zealand, "Block Rockin' Beats" charted at numbers 28 and 29, respectively. In the United States, the song charted on three different Billboard charts: number five on the Bubbling Under Hot 100 Singles chart, number 11 on the Maxi-Singles Sales chart and number 40 on the Modern Rock Tracks chart. In Canada, it reached numbers nine and six on the RPM Dance and Alternative 30 charts, respectively. "Block Rockin' Beats" received a silver record in the UK, after 200,000 singles were sold.

== Impact and legacy ==
In 2003, English music journalist Paul Morley included "Block Rockin' Beats" in his list of "Greatest Pop Single of All Time". In 2005, Blender ranked it number 346 in their "Greatest Songs Since You Were Born". In 2013, Complex included it in their list of "The 15 Best Songs From the Electronica Era". A writer remarked that "there was something about the combined fury of that Schoolly D vocal sample, that hypnotic bassline and those big drums that turned this one into an anthem for the breakbeat set." In 2015, LA Weekly ranked it number 14 in their list of "The 20 Best Dance Music Tracks in History".

In 2020, BBC included "Block Rockin' Beats" in their list of "30 Tracks That Shaped Dance Music Over the Last 30 Years". Jack Needham commented, "Not only was the song an undeniable ear worm, but it took the art of sampling to a new level - borrowing its drums from Bernard Purdie and its vocals from US rapper Schoolly D. There have even been suggestions that the track covertly samples Pink Floyd too." Same year, Mixmag featured the track in their "The Best Basslines in Dance Music", writing, "The bassline here forms one of the most memorable intros in the Chemical Brothers' canon, and continues to serve as a rock solid foundation throughout the explosive track." In 2022, Classic Pop ranked it number 25 in their list of the top 40 dance tracks from the 90's. In 2025, Billboard magazine ranked it number four in their list of "The 100 Best Dance Songs of All Time", adding, "At their best, the Mancunian duo had a way of crafting songs where it felt like not only would the party never end, but it would somehow get better with every passing second. After this one, the block was forever rocked."

== Track listings ==
All tracks are written by Tom Rowlands and Ed Simons except "Block Rockin' Beats", written by Rowlands, Simons, and Jesse Weaver.

UK CD1, Canadian and Australian CD single
No.	Title	Length
1.	"Block Rockin' Beats"
2.	"Prescription Beats"
3.	"Morning Lemon"

UK CD2
No.	Title	Length
1.	"Block Rockin' Beats"
2.	"Block Rockin' Beats" (The Micronauts remix)
3.	"Block Rockin' Beats" (The Micronauts bonus beats)
4.	"Block Rockin' Beats" (radio edit)

UK 12-inch single
No.	Title	Length
1.	"Block Rockin' Beats"
2.	"Morning Lemon"
3.	"Block Rockin' Beats" (The Micronauts remix)

European CD single
No.	Title	Length
1.	"Block Rockin' Beats"
2.	"Prescription Beats"

US and Japanese maxi-CD single
No.	Title	Length
1.	"Block Rockin' Beats"
2.	"Prescription Beats"
3.	"Morning Lemon"
4.	"Block Rockin' Beats" (The Micronauts remix)

US 12-inch single
No.	Title	Length
1.	"Block Rockin' Beats"
2.	"Morning Lemon"
3.	"Block Rockin' Beats" (The Micronauts bonus beats)
4.	"Block Rockin' Beats" (The Micronauts remix)
5.	"Prescription Beats"

== Credits and personnel ==
Credits are lifted from the Dig Your Own Hole album booklet.

Studios

- Recorded at Orinoco Studios (South London, England)
- Mastered at The Exchange (London, England)

Personnel

- The Chemical Brothers – production
  - Tom Rowlands – writing
  - Ed Simons – writing
- Schoolly D – writing (as Jesse Weaver)
- Steve Dub – engineering
- Mike Marsh – mastering

== Charts ==
=== Weekly charts ===
Chart (1997)	Peak position
Australia (ARIA)	28
Belgium (Ultratop 50 Flanders)	44
Canada Dance/Urban (RPM)	9
Canada Rock/Alternative (RPM)	6
Europe (Eurochart Hot 100)	12
Finland (Suomen virallinen lista)	6
Iceland (Íslenski Listinn Topp 40)	2
Ireland (IRMA)	9
Israel (Israeli Singles Chart)	8
New Zealand (Recorded Music NZ)	29
Norway (VG-lista)	13
Scottish Singles Sales (Official Charts)	4
Sweden (Sverigetopplistan)	12
UK Singles (Official Charts)	1
UK Dance (Official Charts)	2
US Bubbling Under Hot 100 (Billboard)	5
US Alternative Airplay (Billboard)	40
US Dance Singles Sales (Billboard)	11

=== Year-end charts ===
Chart (1997)	Position
Iceland (Íslenski Listinn Topp 40)	52
Romania (Romanian Top 100)	77
UK Singles (OCC)	88

== Certifications ==
Region	Certification	Certified units/sales
Australia (ARIA)	Gold	35,000^{‡}
United Kingdom (BPI) Sales since 2004	Gold	400,000^{‡}
^{‡} Sales+streaming figures based on certification alone.

== Release history ==
Region	Date	Format(s)	Label(s)	Ref.
United Kingdom	24 March 1997	12-inch vinyl; CD	Freestyle Dust; Virgin	
United States	7 April 1997	Alternative radio	Astralwerks	
Japan	28 April 1997	CD	Freestyle Dust; Virgin	
