= Come with Us / The Test =

2002 single by the Chemical Brothers

"Come with Us" / "The Test"

Single by the Chemical Brothers

from the album Come with Us
- B-side: "H.I.A"
- Released: 22 April 2002
- Studio: Miloco (South London, England)
- Length: 4:58 ("Come with Us"); 7:46 ("The Test")
- Label: Freestyle Dust; Virgin
- Songwriters: Tom Rowlands, Ed Simons, Tony Rallo, Copperman, Peter Krissen, David Fairstein ("Come with Us"); Tom Rowlands, Ed Simons, Richard Ashcroft, Czesław Niemen ("The Test")
- Producer: The Chemical Brothers

The Chemical Brothers singles chronology
"Star Guitar" (2002)	"Come with Us" / "The Test" (2002)	"The Golden Path" (2003)

Music video
- "The Test" on YouTube

"Come with Us" and "The Test" are two songs by English electronic music duo the Chemical Brothers from their fourth studio album, Come with Us (2002). They were released as a double A-side single in April 2002, serving as the album's third single. The vocals in "The Test" are performed by Richard Ashcroft. When released, the single reached number 11 in Spain, number 14 in the United Kingdom, and number 36 in Ireland. In Italy and the United States, only "Come with Us" was released, peaking at number 41 on the Italian Singles Chart and number eight on the Billboard Dance Club Play chart.

The spoken-word intro from "Come with Us" is sampled from "The Evidence" by Evidence while "The Test" contains a sample from "Pielgrzym" by Polish singer Czesław Niemen, first released in 1972. In Japan, the two songs were swapped in the single title, making the single's title "The Test" / "Come with Us".

== Track listings ==
UK and Australian CD single

1. "Come with Us" (edit)
2. "The Test" (edit)
3. "Come with Us" (Fatboy Slim remix)

UK 12-inch single

A1. "Come with Us"
A2. "Come with Us" (Fatboy Slim remix)
B1. "H.I.A"

UK DVD single

1. "The Test" (video)
2. "Come with Us" (audio—edit)
3. "H.I.A" (audio)
4. "Hey Boy Hey Girl" (excerpts / live video)

European CD single

1. "Come with Us" (edit)
2. "The Test" (edit)

US 12-inch single

A1. "Come with Us"
A2. "H.I.A"
B1. "Come with Us" (Fatboy Slim remix)
B2. "Come with Us" (H Foundation remix)

Japanese CD single

1. "The Test" (edit)
2. "Come with Us" (edit)
3. "Come with Us" (Fatboy Slim remix)

== Credits and personnel ==
Credits are lifted from the Come with Us album booklet.

Studios

- Recorded at Miloco Studios (South London, England)
- Edited in the Miloco Studios basement
- Mastered at The Exchange (London, England)

Personnel

- The Chemical Brothers – production
  - Tom Rowlands – writing
  - Ed Simons – writing
- Tony Rallo – writing on "Come with Us" (from "The Evidence")
- Copperman – writing on "Come with Us" (from "The Evidence")
- Peter Krissen – writing on "Come with Us" (from "The Evidence")
- David Fairstein – writing on "Come with Us" (from "The Evidence")
- Richard Ashcroft – writing on "The Test"
- Czesław Niemen – writing on "The Test" (from "Pielgrzym")
- Steve Dub – engineering
- Greg Fleming – assistant engineering
- Cheeky Paul – editing
- Mike Marsh – mastering

== Charts ==
Chart (2002)	Peak position
Australia (ARIA)	80
Europe (Eurochart Hot 100)	51
Ireland (IRMA)	36
Ireland Dance (IRMA)	2
Italy (FIMI) "Come with Us" only	41
Scotland Singles (Official Charts)	19
Spain (Promusicae)	11
UK Singles (Official Charts)	14
UK Dance (Official Charts)	1
US Dance Club Songs (Billboard) "Come with Us" only	8
US Dance Singles Sales (Billboard) "Come with Us" only	25

== Release history ==
Region	Release date	Format	Label(s)	Catalogue	Ref.
United Kingdom	22 April 2002	CD	Freestyle Dust; Virgin	CHEMSD15	
United Kingdom	22 April 2002	12-inch vinyl	Freestyle Dust; Virgin	CHEMST15	
United Kingdom	22 April 2002	DVD	Freestyle Dust; Virgin	CHEMSDVD15	
Japan	26 April 2002	CD	Freestyle Dust; Virgin	VJCP-12155	
Australia	29 April 2002	CD	Freestyle Dust; Virgin	CHEMSD15	
