= Dig Your Own Hole =

1997 album by the Chemical Brothers

Studio album by the Chemical Brothers
- Released: 7 April 1997
- Recorded: 1996–1997
- Studio: Orinoco (South London, England)
- Genre: Big beat; electronica; breakbeat; psychedelic rock
- Length: 63:27
- Label: Freestyle Dust; Virgin (UK) Astralwerks (US)
- Producer: Tom Rowlands; Ed Simons

The Chemical Brothers chronology
Exit Planet Dust (1995)	Dig Your Own Hole (1997)	Surrender (1999)

Singles from Dig Your Own Hole
- 1. "Setting Sun" Released: 30 September 1996; 2. "Block Rockin' Beats" Released: 24 March 1997; 3. "Elektrobank" Released: 8 September 1997; 4. "The Private Psychedelic Reel" Released: 1 December 1997

Dig Your Own Hole is the second studio album by the English electronic music duo the Chemical Brothers. It was released on 7 April 1997 in the United Kingdom by Freestyle Dust and Virgin Records and in the United States by Astralwerks. It was recorded between 1996 and 1997, and features Noel Gallagher of Oasis and Beth Orton as guest vocalists.

Dig Your Own Hole was the first Chemical Brothers album to reach number one on the UK Albums Chart. Five singles were released, two of which reached number one in the UK: "Setting Sun", "Where Do I Begin", "Block Rockin' Beats", "Elektrobank", and "The Private Psychedelic Reel". The album received critical acclaim and has been included in several British magazines' lists of the best albums ever. The success of the album led the Chemical Brothers to be much sought-after remixers, and they released a mix album in 1998, Brothers Gonna Work It Out.

== Background ==
After the Chemical Brothers' successful debut album, Exit Planet Dust, released in June 1995, the duo continued to tour but quickly sought to record new material. Following the release of "Life Is Sweet", the final single from that album, the duo had changed labels from Junior Boy's Own to Virgin, with Virgin getting credit on their album Exit Planet Dust as well under the liner notes. The duo released an EP, Loops of Fury in January 1996, consisting of new material and a remix of one of the band's earliest and signature tracks, "Chemical Beats".

The songs "It Doesn't Matter" and "Don't Stop the Rock" were released in June 1996 on vinyl as "Electronic Battle Weapon 1" and "Electronic Battle Weapon 2" respectively as promos for DJs to test in clubs. The duo met up with Noel Gallagher. They were interested in collaborating for a track. The Chemical Brothers had reportedly given him an instrumental track and he then wrote lyrics for the track. The song was released as the single "Setting Sun" on 30 September 1996. The song entered the UK Singles Chart at number one. Stereogum said that "the combination of rave sirens and psych-rock far-outness [on Exit Planet Dust] was probably what convinced people like Noel Gallagher and Mercury Rev to jump onboard".

"Where Do I Begin" was released as a promotional single in early 1997. "Block Rockin' Beats" was released on 24 March 1997 and reached number one on the UK Singles Chart, becoming the duo's second number one single.

== Release ==
Dig Your Own Hole was released on 7 April 1997 by record labels Virgin and Freestyle Dust.

"Elektrobank" was released on 8 September 1997 and reached number 17 in the UK Singles Chart. "The Private Psychedelic Reel" was released on 1 December 1997. A numbered release, it was ineligible for the UK Singles Charts. Further physically released promotion for the album include a DJ mix and interview set.

The album was certified platinum by the British Phonographic Industry (BPI) on 21 January 2000. In 2004, the album was packaged with 1995's Exit Planet Dust in a limited edition box set as part of EMI's "2CD Originals" collection.

Dig Your Own Hole was nominated for a Grammy Award for Best Alternative Music Album, at the 40th Annual Grammy Awards.

== Critical reception and legacy ==
Professional ratings
Review scores
Source	Rating
AllMusic	5/5 stars
Chicago Tribune	3.5/4 stars
Entertainment Weekly	A
The Guardian	4/5 stars
NME	8/10
Pitchfork	8.4/10
Q	4/5 stars
Rolling Stone	4/5 stars
Spin	8/10
The Village Voice	A−

In Rolling Stone, David Fricke wrote that Dig Your Own Hole "burns the whole rock vs. techno argument into a fine, white ash", calling it "a wild beauty of a record" that "rocks, rolls and surges without factionalist prejudice or fear of genre". Entertainment Weekly reviewer David Browne found that the Chemical Brothers manage to turn sounds and "recycled voice snippets" into "alluring hooks in and of themselves, bringing the record as close to pop as techno has come so far", while The Village Voice's Robert Christgau attributed the album's effectiveness to the duo's "spirit—generous, jubilant, unfazed by industrial doom, in love with energy and sound."

In 1998, Q readers voted Dig Your Own Hole the 49th greatest album of all time, and it was also included in Q TV's "Top 100 Albums of All Time" list in 2008. In 2000, the same magazine placed it at number 42 in its list of the 100 Greatest British Albums Ever. NME ranked it at number 414 in its 2014 list of the 500 Greatest Albums of All Time. Rolling Stone included it in their list of the "100 Best Albums of the Nineties", as did Spin.

=== Uses in other media ===
The song "Setting Sun" was used in the 1997 films The Saint and Nightwatch. "Setting Sun" was also included on the official soundtrack album for The Saint. A poster of the album can be seen in the room of Kirsten Dunst's character Kelly in the 2001 film Get Over It. In 2003, "Block Rockin' Beats" was used in Charlie's Angels: Full Throttle and that same year, "Where Do I Begin" was used in the film Monster and the television series Queer as Folk, with the film Red Eye also using "Where Do I Begin" in 2005. In 2020, the documentary Console Wars featured "Block Rockin' Beats".

== Track listing ==
All tracks are written by Tom Rowlands and Ed Simons, except where noted.

No.	Title	Length
1.	"Block Rockin' Beats" (Rowlands, Simons, Jesse Weaver)	5:14
2.	"Dig Your Own Hole"	5:27
3.	"Elektrobank"	8:18
4.	"Piku"	4:54
5.	"Setting Sun" (Rowlands, Simons, Noel Gallagher)	5:29
6.	"It Doesn't Matter" (Rowlands, Simons, Paul Conly, John Emelin, Tom Flye, Rusty Ford, Kim King)	6:14
7.	"Don't Stop the Rock"	4:50
8.	"Get Up on It Like This" (Rowlands, Simons, Quincy Jones)	2:47
9.	"Lost in the K-Hole"	3:52
10.	"Where Do I Begin"	6:56
11.	"The Private Psychedelic Reel" (Rowlands, Simons, Jonathan Donahue)	9:22
Total length:		63:22

Sample credits

- "Block Rockin' Beats" contains samples of "Gucci Again", written and performed by Schoolly D.
- "It Doesn't Matter" contains samples of "It Comes On Anyhow", written by Paul Conly, John Emelin, Tom Flye, Rusty Ford and Kim King, and performed by Lothar and the Hand People.
- "Get Up on It Like This" contains samples of "Money Runner", written by Quincy Jones and performed by John Schroeder.

== Personnel ==
Credits for Dig Your Own Hole adapted from album liner notes.

The Chemical Brothers

- Tom Rowlands – production
- Ed Simons – production

Additional musicians

- Noel Gallagher – vocals on "Setting Sun"
- Beth Orton – vocals on "Where Do I Begin"
- DJ Kool Herc – vocals on introduction of "Elektrobank"
- Keith Murray – sampled vocals on "Elektrobank"
- Ali Friend – bass on "Elektrobank" and "Dig Your Own Hole"
- Seggs – bass on "Lost in the K-Hole"
- Jonathan Donahue – clarinet on "The Private Psychedelic Reel"
- Simon Phillips – drums

Additional technical personnel

- Cheeky Paul – compiling, editing
- Steve Dub – engineering
- Jon Collyer – engineering (assistant)
- Jon Dee – engineering on "Setting Sun"
- Tim Holmes – engineering on "Get Up on It Like This"
- Mike Marsh – mastering

Design

- Negativespace – design

== Charts ==
=== Weekly charts ===
Chart (1997)	Peak position
Australian Albums (ARIA)	3
Austrian Albums (Ö3 Austria)	26
Belgian Albums (Ultratop Flanders)	7
Belgian Albums (Ultratop Wallonia)	8
Canadian Albums (Billboard)	4
Dutch Albums (Album Top 100)	23
Finnish Albums (Suomen virallinen lista)	14
French Albums (SNEP)	24
German Albums (Offizielle Top 100)	25
Hungarian Albums (MAHASZ)	28
New Zealand Albums (RMNZ)	2
Norwegian Albums (VG-lista)	4
Scottish Albums (OCC)	2
Spanish Albums (AFYVE)	15
Swedish Albums (Sverigetopplistan)	3
Swiss Albums (Schweizer Hitparade)	30
UK Albums (OCC)	1
UK R&B Albums (OCC)	35
US Billboard 200	14

Chart (2022)	Peak position
UK Dance Albums (OCC)	1

Chart (2026)	Peak position
Greek Albums (IFPI)	68

=== Year-end charts ===
Chart (1997)	Position
Belgian Albums (Ultratop Flanders)	93
Canadian Albums (Nielsen Soundscan)	80
New Zealand Albums (RMNZ)	19
UK Albums (OCC)	49
US Billboard 200	170

== Certifications and sales ==
Region	Certification	Certified units/sales
Australia (ARIA)	Platinum	70,000^{‡}
Canada (Music Canada)	Platinum	100,000^{^}
Italy	—	30,000
Japan (RIAJ)	Platinum	200,000^{^}
New Zealand (RMNZ)	Platinum	15,000^{^}
Spain	—	35,000
United Kingdom (BPI)	Platinum	308,000
United States (RIAA)	Gold	756,000
Summaries
Europe	—	775,000
Worldwide	—	2,000,000
^{^} Shipments figures based on certification alone.^{‡} Sales+streaming figures based on certification alone.
