= Music:Response =

2000 single by the Chemical Brothers

EP by the Chemical Brothers
- Released: 6 March 2000
- Genre: Techno
- Label: Freestyle Dust; Virgin; Astralwerks
- Producer: The Chemical Brothers

The Chemical Brothers chronology
The Charlatans UK vs. The Chemical Brothers (1997)	Music:Response (2000)	AmericanEP (2002)

Music:Response is an extended play by English electronic music duo the Chemical Brothers. The song "Music:Response" contains a sample of "Make It Hot" by Nicole Wray featuring Missy Elliott. "The Gentleman Thief" remix was made by Justin Robertson. This EP was not eligible for the UK charts because it had five songs instead of three songs, which is required for qualification. The American EP was met with critical response by Robert Christgau, who gave it a score of "neither".

In France, "Music:Response" was released as a double A-side with "Asleep from Day". The song "Piku Playground" live was originally released in 1998 on the MTV compilation Amp 2. The song "Freak of the Week" was previously released in June 1998 as "Electronic Battle Weapon 4".

== Critical reception ==
Professional ratings
Review scores
Source	Rating
AllMusic	2.5/5 stars
Los Angeles Times	3/5 stars
Pitchfork	6.5/10
Robert Christgau	(neither)
Wall of Sound	52/100

The EP received mixed reviews from music critics.

== Track listing ==
UK CD EP
No.	Title	Length
1.	"Music:Response"	5:34
2.	"Freak of the Week"	6:06
3.	"Enjoyed"	8:08
4.	"Music:Response" (Gentleman Thief mix)	7:36
5.	"Music:Response" (Futureshock Main Response)	8:21

US enhanced CD EP
No.	Title	Length
1.	"Music:Response"	5:34
2.	"Freak of the Week"	6:06
3.	"Enjoyed"	8:08
4.	"Music:Response" (Gentleman Thief mix)	7:36
5.	"Music:Response" (Futureshock Main Response)	8:21
6.	"Out of Control" (live from Glastonbury 2000)	8:15
7.	"Got Glint?" (live from Glastonbury 2000)	4:00
8.	"Let Forever Be" (music video)	3:42

Japanese CD EP
No.	Title	Length
1.	"Music:Response"	5:34
2.	"Freak of the Week"	6:06
3.	"Enjoyed"	8:08
4.	"Piku Playground" (live)	4:56
5.	"Setting Sun" (live) (featuring Noel Gallagher)	8:21
