= The Boxer (The Chemical Brothers song) =

2005 single by the Chemical Brothers

Single by the Chemical Brothers

from the album Push the Button
- B-side: "Swiper"
- Released: 11 July 2005
- Recorded: 2003–2004
- Studio: Miloco (South London)
- Length: 4:08 (album version); 3:42 (radio edit)
- Label: Freestyle Dust; Virgin
- Songwriters: Tom Rowlands; Ed Simons; Tim Burgess
- Producer: The Chemical Brothers

The Chemical Brothers singles chronology
"Believe" (2005)	"The Boxer" (2005)	"Do It Again" (2007)

Music video
- "The Boxer" on YouTube

"The Boxer" is a song recorded by English electronic music duo the Chemical Brothers for their fifth studio album Push the Button (2005). It served as the album's third single in the United Kingdom and Europe, released by Virgin Records and Freestyle Dust, and as the second single in the United States via Astralwerks. The song is a psychedelic pop track which features The Charlatans' lead singer Tim Burgess on vocals and as a co-writer. This is the second collaboration between Burgess and the duo, following "Life Is Sweet", which was released 10 years earlier.

However, it received mixed reviews from music critics who, while praising its production, criticised Burgess' vocals. "The Boxer" was the first single by the Chemical Brothers not to reach the top 40 on the UK Singles Chart, reaching only number 41. Elsewhere, it charted in Spain, Ireland and on the US Dance Singles Sales chart. Burgess and the duo later performed the track at the BBC Radio 2 Electric Proms in 2007.

The song's music video was directed by director duo Ne-o and shot in Budapest, Hungary. The visual, which features a basketball bouncing around the streets with its owner running to catch it, drew comparisons with the 1956 short film The Red Balloon. A video for an alternate version of the song was directed by Adam Smith and donated to the charity group Good for Nothing's 50/50 Make or Break campaign in 2011. It was also remixed by DFA, whose version received much acclaim from critics.

== Background and production ==
'The Boxer'
A psychedelic pop song, "The Boxer", features a looping piano sample on a mid-tempo rhythm with Burgess' "weedy and soft" vocals.

When the Chemical Brothers started to write music again after finishing the album Come with Us (2002), "The Boxer" was one of the earliest tracks they composed for their next album, Push the Button (2005). The Charlatans' lead singer Tim Burgess, who had collaborated on the duo's debut album track "Life Is Sweet" 10 years earlier, contributed the song's vocals. According to the group, of all their collaborators, Burgess remained a close friend. They shared that, "If he's in London, we would probably have a drink together, three of us, or, you know, when we're in Los Angeles, he will come to our gig."

Originally, the song's chorus was "set in stone," but the Chemical Brothers asked Burgess to sing it and write some additional lyrics. They also wanted him to sing the vocals at the end of the track—lyrics like "I'm a hustler, I'm a tiger"—in the same vocal style he used earlier in his career, which Burgess himself described as "weedy and soft". The duo said that the resulting vocal sounds very different from the one on their previous collaboration. The Guardian's Alexis Petridis described it as having a "standard-issue mid-Atlannick accent", meaning "mid-Atlantic" with some American features.

Astralwerks released a statement describing the song as a combination of the duo's signature psychedelic pop sound and "modern stabs". Its production was built on a "ramshackle", slightly off-tempo piano sample set above a looping mid-tempo rhythm. PopMatters Tim O'Neil described it as "syncopated" and "slightly light-headed". He also noted the duo's different style on the track compared with their previous records. Scott Plagenhoef of Pitchfork Media commented that the song along with "Galvanize" reminded him of the duo's "early B-Boy/techno days".

== Release ==
On 11 July 2005, the song was released as two CD singles and a 12-inch single in the United Kingdom as Push the Button's third single. The British and European CD1 features an edited version of the track and a previously unreleased song "Swiper". A Europe-only maxi single contained the original "The Boxer", the DFA version, and a live rendition of "Believe" at the Mediolanum Forum. The second UK CD single contains the same tracklist and an additional music video for its title track while the 12-inch single containing the original, the DFA version and "Swiper".

A day later, the CD and the 12-inch single were released in the United States as the album's second single; both were expanded to EPs featuring an extended version of the song, two previous Europe and UK only-released B-sides "Giant" and "Spring", with remixes from DFA, Mathew Jonson, Erol Alkan and Abe Duque. This EP, with the inclusion of the track "Swiper", was also available for digital download exclusively in the US. Outside the US, a radio edit of "The Boxer" and its edited DFA version were released digitally as individual singles. On 25 October 2007, Burgess and the duo performed the song live at the BBC Radio 2 Electric Proms at The Roundhouse in Camden, London.

=== DFA version ===
The DFA version, mixed by British DJ Tim Goldsworthy and LCD Soundsystem's member, American musician James Murphy, was later added to their remix album The DFA Remixes: Chapter One (2006). This remix received much praise from critics, with Billboard's Kerri Mason singling it out as "the soundtrack to a 20-something hipster walking the downtown streets, iPod in pocket" that also "sounds like a Paradise Garage-era Peter Brown record". Tim Finney from Pitchfork highly praised the "Pearsonesque remix" as the "synth-laden Balearic house number that shimmers with unabashed gorgeousness". Along with another lengthy song on the album, the remix for Hot Chip's "(Just Like We) Breakdown", both were said in a review by Zeth Lundy of PopMatters to "unfold with a delicate subtext manufactured by the slow-building minimalism—they're patient dedications to the mutability of the groove, never boring and always fascinating to experience". musicOMH's Tom Woods said that "a wealth of percussive techniques" keeps things "fresh and interesting", but criticised its length which made the song become a "stretch". He added that, "vocal use is less dominant here, which gives Murphy a chance to demonstrate a clear talent for sculpting dynamic synth-led beats".

== Reception ==
=== Critical reception ===
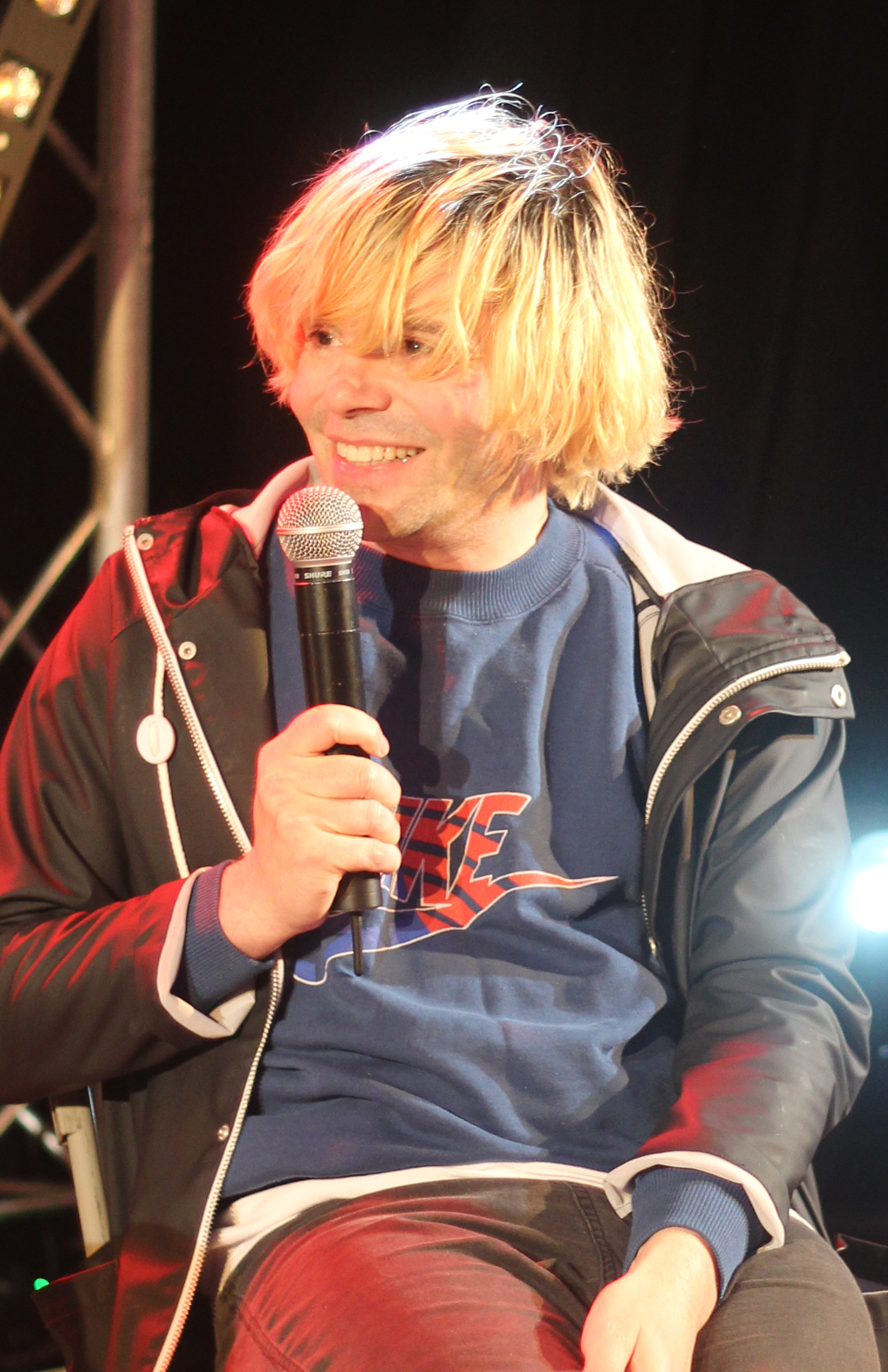
Burgess' performance received mixed reactions from music critics

In a review for PopMatters, music critic Tim O'Neil called the song "an odd track" that sounded like nothing he'd heard before. He continued: "I wouldn't be surprised if it was the next single [after "Galvanize"], because its [sic] not the kind of track you forget." John Bush of AllMusic listed the track as one of his album's track picks, while Michaelangelo Matos of Spin called it one of the album's best moments—one that was "less about the successive climaxes than steady-state flow". Jack Smith of BBC Music described the song as "cutting edge" and "hook-laden", also highlighted it as "a welcome return" for Burgess.

However, The Guardian's review by Alexis Petridis was very negative. He criticised Burgess' vocal styling as "the Awful Falsetto", saying that "not even a mass of special effects can stop Burgess' shortcomings shining through", and calling the track one of the album's new ideas that "flop[ped]". Similarly, Matt D'Cruz of Drowned in Sound also criticised Burgess' "strained" vocal, calling it "a poor fit for the Chems' stuttering rave pianos and ponderous beats". Scott Plagenhoef of Pitchfork Media remarked on the "unremarkable verses and nasally vocals", although the song, along with "Galvanize", reminded him of the duo's "early B-Boy/techno days". He felt both songs were missing the ferocity and sub-bass rattlings of their "earlier cousins". The latter song was also said by Plagenhoef to be "far better". Another negative review came from Slant Magazine, where journalist Eric Henderson called the track one of the album's "unsuccessful interpolations of UK grime".

=== Chart performance ===
In the United Kingdom, the duo's home country, the song entered the UK Singles Chart at its peak, number 41, in the week ending 23 July 2005. It was their first single not to chart in the top 40. It dropped to number 65 in its second week and moved to number 90 for a week before disappearing from the chart. "The Boxer" made its debut at number 36 on the Irish Singles Chart in the week ending of 14 July before dropping to number 44 in its final week. It had a one-week stay on the Spanish Albums Chart at number 17 in the week of 31 July, and at number 15 on Billboard's US Hot Dance Singles Sales chart in the 30 July issue.

== Music video ==
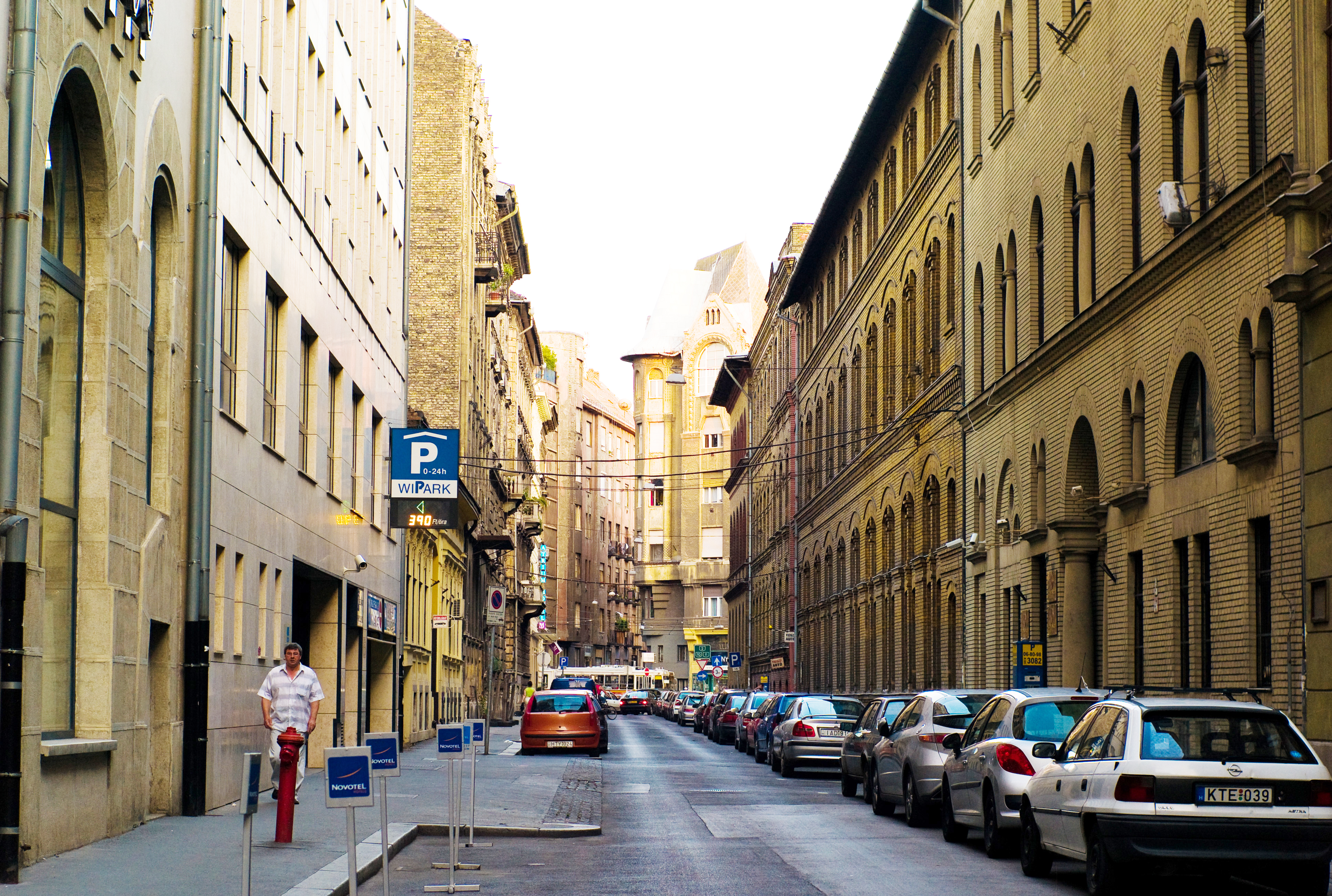
The video was filmed in Budapest, Hungary over several days

London-based director duo Ne-o, Jake Knight and Ryoko Tanaka, directed the music video for "The Boxer". They were on holiday in Hong Kong and were sent a track with DRM which Knight said made it frustrating to play through dial-up connection. Tanaka eventually came up with the idea of a ball that "connected through things". Knight did not quite understand the idea at first, but through a process of miscommunication, they wrote the video's treatment about "a crazy basketball" which was the quickest treatment they had ever written at the time.

The video was then filmed in Budapest, Hungary, over several days. Knight said: "The reason for the location stems from the music in the actual video. The ball needs to bounce synchronized with the 16th or 8th beat in the track. To do that, we needed a space with equidistant or closed surfaces to bounce around. A roof low to the floor but with uprights. Obviously parking lots are ideal. But it was a technical reason that made us go with it." Ne-o used an Arri Super 16mm film camera to shoot the film, then edited it in Adobe Premiere Pro, with 3D animation using Autodesk Softimage.

Writing in his book Reinventing Music Video: Next-generation Directors, Their Inspiration, and Work, British author-director Matt Hanson claimed some might call the video the duo's first action sequence and stated it could be considered "a high-octane version" of Albert Lamorisse's short film The Red Balloon. He wrote: "While [the short] was a poetic 1956 study of a boy befriended by a balloon, here the action is reversed and revved up, with the basketball defiantly trying to bounce away from the city street kid."

The video opens with a boy with a basketball in his bag walking out of a car park. The basketball then begins to bounce out of the bag, jumps out of the city streets and gets into a Lada taxi. After that, it continues to bounce and causes troubles in an office. Its owner struggles to chase the ball but then manages to catch it for a second. Unfortunately, the ball escapes and is run over by a truck driven by the Chemical Brothers. The basketball re-inflates after the accident, jumps into and eventually gets trapped inside an old phone booth near Baross Street, swells to an enormous size, and explodes.

Later in 2011, the Chemical Brothers and director Adam Smith (credited as Flat Nose George) donated the visual of an alternate version of the song entitled "50/50 Mix", in support of the 50/50 Make or Break campaign. 50/50 Make or Break was a fundraising project aimed at raising money for East Africa, created by UK-based charity group Good for Nothing.

== Formats and track listings ==
- European and UK CD single No. 1
1. "The Boxer" (edit) – 3:43
2. "Swiper" – 6:12
- European maxi CD single No. 2
1. "The Boxer" – 4:22
2. "The Boxer" (DFA version) – 9:38
3. "Believe" (live at The Milano Forum) – 4:21
- UK maxi-enhanced CD single No. 2
1. "The Boxer" – 4:22
2. "The Boxer" (DFA version) – 9:38
3. "Believe" (live at The Milano Forum) – 4:21
4. "The Boxer" (music video) – 3:23
- US CD and digital download EP
1. "The Boxer" – 4:21
2. "The Boxer" (DFA version) – 9:44
3. "Giant" – 4:33
4. "Spring" – 5:29
5. "Believe" (Mathew Jonson remix) – 9:27
6. "Believe" (Erol Alkan's 'Feel Me' re-work) – 6:27
7. "Galvanize" (Abe Duque remix) (featuring Q-Tip) – 7:36
8. "Swiper" (digital download only) – 6:21

- UK 12-inch single
1. "The Boxer" – 4:21
2. "Swiper" (digital download only) – 6:21
3. "The Boxer" (DFA version) – 9:44
- US double 12-inch
1. "The Boxer" (DFA version) – 9:44
2. "Giant" – 4:33
3. "Believe" (Erol Alkan's 'Feel Me' re-work) – 6:27
4. "Spring" – 5:29
5. "Believe" (Mathew Jonson remix) – 9:27
6. "Galvanize" (Abe Duque remix) (featuring Q-Tip) – 7:36
7. "The Boxer" – 4:21
- Non-US radio edit digital download
1. "The Boxer" (edit) – 3:42
- Non-US remix digital download
1. "The Boxer" (DFA version) (edit) – 6:50

== Credits and personnel ==
Credits adapted from the CD single liner notes.

- The Chemical Brothers – music producer, songwriter
- Steve Dub – engineer
- Mike Marsh – master
- Tim Burgess – vocals, songwriter
- Tappin Gofton – designer, art director
- Kam Tang – illustrator

== Charts ==
Weekly chart performance for "The Boxer"
Chart (2005)	Peak position
Ireland (IRMA)	36
Scottish Singles Sales (Official Charts)	38
Spain (Promusicae)	17
UK Singles (Official Charts)	41
US Dance Singles Sales (Billboard)	15
