= Edmond Séchan =

French cinematographer (1919–2002)

Edmond Séchan (20 September 1919 in Montpellier – 7 June 2002 in Courbevoie) was a French cinematographer and film director.

== Biography ==
Passionate about image, Séchan earned a reputation as an excellent director of photography and is credited in several notable films such as That Man from Rio, Tendre Voyou, La Carapate and La Boum. He worked with great directors (Jean Becker, Jean-Pierre Mocky, Philippe de Broca, Pierre Étaix), but most notably with Louis Malle and Jacques-Yves Cousteau on The Silent World. Attracted to directing, Séchan made two feature films in the 1960s, which were not successful. On the other hand, his short films earned him a harvest of prestigious prizes: Le Haricot, (Short Film Palme d'Or at Cannes in 1963) and Toine (César du meilleur court métrage in 1981). Most especially, he belongs to the small French circle to have won Oscars in Hollywood, in 1960 with The Golden Fish, produced by Cousteau, in the category Academy Award for Best Live Action Short Film, and in 1975 with One-Eyed Men Are Kings, in collaboration with Michel Leroy, produced by Paul Claudon.

Edmond Séchan is the uncle of French singer Renaud. Renaud and his brother make an appearance in The Red Balloon, a movie in which Séchan worked as director of photography.

== Select filmography ==
=== Director ===
- Niok l'éléphant (1957)
- The Golden Fish - short (1959)
- L'Ours (1960)
- Le Haricot - short (Short Film Palme d'Or) (1960)
- Pour un amour lointain (1968)
- One-Eyed Men Are Kings - Academy Award 1975 for Best Short Subject. (1974)
- Photo souvenir - telefilm (1978)
- Toine - short (1980)
- Les Travailleurs de la mer, TV miniseries (1986)

=== Screenwriter ===
- Pour un amour lointain (1968)

=== Cinematographer ===
- Crin-Blanc, directed by Albert Lamorisse (1953)
- Le Monde du silence (The Silent World), documentary, directed by Jacques-Yves Cousteau (1955)
- Le Ballon rouge directed by Albert Lamorisse (1956)
- Les Aventures d'Arsène Lupin directed by Jacques Becker (1957)
- Fugitive in Saigon directed by Marcel Camus (1957)
- Les Dragueurs directed by Jean-Pierre Mocky (1959)
- The Triumph of Michael Strogoff directed by Victor Tourjansky (1961)
- That Man from Rio directed by Philippe de Broca (1963)
- Échappement libre directed by Jean Becker (1964)
- La Grande frousse directed by Jean-Pierre Mocky (1964)
- Heaven on One's Head (Le Ciel sur la tête) directed by Yves Ciampi (1965)
- Les Tribulations d'un chinois en Chine (Up to His Ears) directed by Philippe de Broca (1965)
- Le Gendarme à New York directed by Jean Girault (1965)
- Monnaie de singe directed by Yves Robert (1965)
- Tendre Voyou directed by Jean Becker (1966)
- All Mad About Him directed by Norbert Carbonnaux (1967)
- À cœur joie (Two Weeks in September) directed by Serge Bourguignon (1967)
- La Pince à ongles, short directed by Jean-Claude Carrière (1969)
- Sur un arbre perché directed by Serge Korber (1970)
- D'amour et d'eau fraîche directed by Jean-Pierre Blanc (1975)
- Monsieur Papa directed by Philippe Monnier (1977)
- Les petits câlins directed by Jean-Marie Poiré (1978)
- La Carapate directed by Gérard Oury (1978)
- L'Esprit de famille directed by Jean-Pierre Blanc (1978)
- La Boum directed by Claude Pinoteau (1980)
- La Boum 2 directed by Claude Pinoteau (1982)
- Jamais avant le mariage directed by Daniel Ceccaldi (1982)
- La Septième Cible directed by Claude Pinoteau (1984)
- Les Morfalous directed by Henri Verneuil (1984)
- Joyeuses Pâques (Happy Easter) directed by Georges Lautner (1984)
