= Push the Button (The Chemical Brothers album) =

Studio album by the Chemical Brothers
- Released: 24 January 2005
- Studio: Miloco Studios (South London); The Hit Factory (New York City)
- Genre: Electronica
- Length: 60:12
- Label: Freestyle Dust; Virgin (UK) Astralwerks; EMI (US)
- Producer: The Chemical Brothers

The Chemical Brothers chronology
Singles 93–03 (2003)	Push the Button (2005)	We Are the Night (2007)

Singles from Push the Button
- 1. "Galvanize" Released: 22 November 2004; 2. "Believe" Released: 2 May 2005; 3. "The Boxer" Released: 11 July 2005

Push the Button is the fifth album by the English electronic music duo the Chemical Brothers, released in January 2005.

The album received mostly positive reviews from music critics and won the Grammy Award for Best Electronic/Dance Album in January 2006. It was certified Gold by the BPI on 28 January 2005.

== Singles ==
"Galvanize" was the first single from the album, released on 22 November 2004 in the United States and on 17 January 2005 in the United Kingdom. It peaked at number three on the UK Singles Chart. "Believe" was the second single from the album, released on 2 May 2005. It peaked at number 18. "The Boxer" was the third single from the album, released on 11 July 2005. It peaked at number 41.

Live 05 was released as a digital EP promoting the album on 29 November 2005. It was recorded live from their 2005 tour.

== Reception ==
Professional ratings
Aggregate scores
Source	Rating
Metacritic	71/100
Review scores
Source	Rating
AllMusic	3.5/5 stars
Entertainment Weekly	B−
The Guardian	4/5 stars
Los Angeles Times	3.5/4 stars
NME	4/10
Pitchfork	7.0/10
Rolling Stone	3.5/5 stars
Spin	B+
Uncut	4/5 stars
The Village Voice	A−

Push the Button received very positive reviews by music critics upon its release. BBC Music said of the album "The Chemical Brothers return with their rebel rockin' fifth studio album that blows all stylistic boundaries down in the process." Lead single "Galvanize", with Q-Tip on lead vocals, peaked at number 3 in the UK Singles Chart. "The Boxer" also charted in the UK Singles Chart, in addition to "Believe".

Complex called it a "remotely forgettable project."

== Track listing ==
No.	Title	Writer(s)	Length
1.	"Galvanize"	Tom Rowlands; Ed Simons; Kamaal Fareed; Najat Aatabou	6:33
2.	"The Boxer"	Rowlands; Simons; Tim Burgess	4:07
3.	"Believe"	Rowlands; Simons; Rowland Okereke	7:01
4.	"Hold Tight London"	Rowlands; Simons; Anna-Lynne Williams	6:00
5.	"Come Inside"	Rowlands; Simons	4:46
6.	"The Big Jump"	Rowlands; Simons	4:43
7.	"Left Right"	Rowlands; Simons; Anwar Prescott	4:14
8.	"Close Your Eyes"	Rowlands; Simons; Romeo Stodart	6:13
9.	"Shake Break Bounce"	Rowlands; Simons; Rashia Fisher; Justin Smith; Curtis Jones	3:44
10.	"Marvo Ging"	Rowlands; Simons	5:28
11.	"Surface to Air"	Rowlands; Simons	7:23
Total length:			60:12

Japanese edition bonus track
No.	Title	Writer(s)	Length
12.	"Giant"	Rowlands; Simons	4:32
Total length:			64:44

Sample credits

- "Galvanize" contains samples of "Just Tell Me the Truth", written and performed by Najat Aatabou.
- "Come Inside" contains samples of "Everyday We Die a Little", written and performed by Sara Ayers.
- "Left Right" contains samples of "Heavy Dramatic Track", from Production Music Beds MM123.
- "Shake Break Bounce" contains samples of "Party & Bullshit", written by Rashia Fisher, Justin Smith and Curtis Jones, and performed by Rah Digga.

== Personnel ==
Credits for Push the Button adapted from album liner notes.

=== The Chemical Brothers ===
- Tom Rowlands – production
- Ed Simons – production

=== Additional musicians ===
- Q-Tip – vocals on "Galvanize"
- Tim Burgess – vocals on "The Boxer"
- Kele Okereke – vocals on "Believe"
- Anna-Lynne Williams – vocals on "Hold Tight London"
- Jon Brookes – percussion on "Hold Tight London"
- Anwar Superstar – vocals on "Left Right"
- The Magic Numbers – vocals on "Close Your Eyes"

=== Additional technical personnel ===
- Cheeky Paul – editing
- Steve Dub – engineering
- Ben Thackery – engineering (assistant)
- Mike Marsh – mastering
- Vaughn Merrick – recording on "Galvanize"

=== Design ===
- The Chemical Brothers – art direction
- Tappin Gofton – art direction
- Kam Tang – artwork

== Charts ==
=== Weekly charts ===
Chart (2005)	Peak position
Australian Albums (ARIA)	5
Austrian Albums (Ö3 Austria)	18
Belgian Albums (Ultratop Flanders)	1
Belgian Albums (Ultratop Wallonia)	10
Danish Albums (Hitlisten)	31
Dutch Albums (Album Top 100)	7
Finnish Albums (Suomen virallinen lista)	12
French Albums (SNEP)	17
German Albums (Offizielle Top 100)	11
Italian Albums (FIMI)	2
New Zealand Albums (RMNZ)	8
Norwegian Albums (VG-lista)	20
Portuguese Albums (AFP)	15
Scottish Albums (OCC)	2
Spanish Albums (Promusicae)	13
Swedish Albums (Sverigetopplistan)	26
Swiss Albums (Schweizer Hitparade)	8
UK Albums (OCC)	1
US Billboard 200	59
US Top Dance Albums (Billboard)	1

=== Year-end charts ===
Chart (2005)	Position
Belgian Albums (Ultratop Flanders)	37
Swiss Albums (Schweizer Hitparade)	96
UK Albums (OCC)	79
US Top Dance/Electronic Albums (Billboard)	9

== Certifications ==
Region	Certification	Certified units/sales
Australia (ARIA)	Gold	35,000^{^}
France	—	45,100
Greece (IFPI Greece)	Gold	10,000^{^}
Ireland (IRMA)	Platinum	15,000^{^}
Japan (RIAJ)	Gold	100,000^{^}
Russia (NFPF)	Gold	10,000^{*}
United Kingdom (BPI)	Platinum	300,000^{‡}
^{*} Sales figures based on certification alone.^{^} Shipments figures based on certification alone.^{‡} Sales+streaming figures based on certification alone.

== Release history ==
Region	Date	Format	Label	Ref.
Japan	13 January 2005	CD	Toshiba-EMI	
United Kingdom	24 January 2005	CD; vinyl	Virgin	
Australia	24 January 2005	CD	Virgin	
United States	25 January 2005	CD	Astralwerks	
