= Denys Colomb de Daunant =

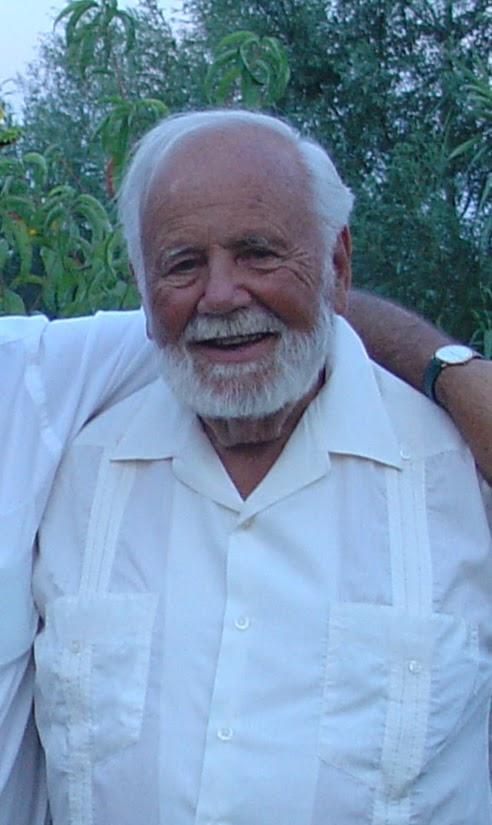
- Denys Colomb de Daunant at Hotel Cacharel in July 2005 (photo by Jeffrey Taylor)
- Born: Albin Théodore Denys Colomb de Daunant; 21 November 1922; Nîmes, France
- Died: 22 March 2006 (aged 83); Nîmes, France
- Occupations: Filmmaker, writer, photographer, cultural activist
- Notable work: White Mane

Albin Théodore Denys Colomb de Daunant (21 November 1922 – 22 March 2006) was a French writer, poet, photographer and filmmaker, best known for his work on the multi-award-winning 1953 short film White Mane. An aristocrat and modern dandy, he was an iconic figure of France's rural Camargue region.

== Biography ==
The son of Auguste Colomb de Daunant and L. Carenou1, Denys Colomb de Daunant was born into a Protestant family in the Gard department of southern France. The Colomb de Daunants were major landowners and ran a number of traditional mas and factories.

During the Second World War, he had to flee France for having insulted a German officer. He attempted to rejoin the Free French Forces in Morocco, but was captured while crossing the Pyrenees and imprisoned.

Returning to the Camargue in 1947, at the age of 25, he purchased the Cacharel mas in Saintes-Maries-de-la-Mer, where he was to live for more than sixty years, transforming it in the process into a rustic horse-riding centre with no running water, electricity, or telephone line. Cacharel became one of the area's best-known manades for both horses and Camargue bulls. Though this remained his base, he travelled a lot and became friends with many of the prominent cultural figures of his time, including Picasso, Chagall, Ernest Hemingway, and Salvador Dalí. He was close to Frédéric Mistral, and contributed to the latter's Occitan language magazine Aïoli.

In 1948 he married Monique Bonis, the granddaughter of Colomb de Daunant's spiritual forebear, iconic Camargue pioneer Folco de Baroncelli-Javon.

He was the manager of the bullfighting ring at Saintes-Marie-de-la-Mer, and sometimes took part in bullfights himself.

With Albert Lamorisse and James Agee, Colomb de Daunant was one of the screenwriters of White Mane, a short film released in 1952 that focused on the wild horses of the Camargue, and much of it was filmed at the mas de Cacharel. With Lamorisse he also co-authored the novel of the same name that appeared in 1953.

He spent much of his life fighting to protect the cultural heritage of the Camargue, campaigning for example against the encroachment of electricity pylons. He avoided using electricity himself, and was known in France for perpetuating the image first embodied by Folco de Baroncelli of the Camargue as an area of tough men and wild animals – at times, indeed, he even dressed in traditional clothing from Baroncelli's time.

He died on 22 March 2006 at the age of 85, survived by two children, Florian and Sylvie Colomb de Daunant.

== Works ==
=== Bibliography ===
- La nuit du Sagittaire, 2006, (ISBN 2846261059)
- Camargue, 1955 (with Jean Proal)

=== Filmography ===
As director:

- Corrida interdite (1959)
- Le songe des chevaux sauvages (1960) (also screenwriter)
- L'abrivade (1963)

As actor:

- Crin-Blanc : le cheval sauvage (White Mane) (1953) (also screenwriter)
- Aux frontières du possible (1974)
- Alerte au minotaure (1974)
