= Dream Doll =

1979 British–Yugoslavian animated short film

Dream Doll (Croatian: Lutka snova) is a 1979 British–Yugoslavian animated short film by Bob Godfrey and Zlatko Grgić as a co-production between Zagreb Film and Bob Godfrey Films. The authors shared similar art styles and animation philosophies such as using absurdist gags and disheveled drawings.

== Plot ==
Dream Doll is a film with erotic overtones where a gentleman falls in love with a sex doll. The short ends with the man "born aloft by the flocks of dolls" as a deliberate parody of Disney's Peter Pan. Dream Doll is cited as one of Godfrey's most prominent works, although it also could be a homage to Albert Lamorisse's The Red Balloon.

== Reception ==
The short was nominated for an Academy Award for Best Animated Short Film in 1980.
