= Maurice Leroux =

Maurice Leroux may refer to:

- Maurice Le Roux (1923–1992), French composer and conductor
- Maurice Leroux (footballer), French footballer who was a member of the French squad in the 1920 Olympics
