= Rum Runners =

1971 film

Boulevard du Rhum
- Promotional poster
- Directed by: Robert Enrico
- Written by: Jacques Pecheral; Robert Enrico; Pierre Pelegri; Tony Recoder
- Produced by: Alain Poiré
- Starring: Brigitte Bardot; Lino Ventura; Bill Travers
- Cinematography: Jean Boffety
- Edited by: Michel Lewin
- Music by: François de Roubaix
- Distributed by: Gaumont Distribution
- Release date: 13 October 1971 (France)
- Running time: 135 min
- Countries: France; Italy; Spain
- Language: French
- Budget: $1 million
- Box office: 1,279,586 admissions (France)

Rum Runners (French: Boulevard du Rhum) is a 1971 French-Italian-Spanish adventure film directed by Robert Enrico and produced by Alain Poiré. It is based on Jacques Pecheral's novel of the same name. It stars Brigitte Bardot and Lino Ventura and was released in France on 13 October 1971.

== Plot ==
In 1925, during the Prohibition era in the United States, Cornelius van Zeelinga, a tough but not very bright captain, operates as a rum-runner along the three-mile line from the American coasts known as the "Rum Row." His boat is intercepted and sunk by the U.S. Coast Guard. Surviving the ordeal, Cornelius heads to Mexico, where he gets involved in a dangerous game where people pay to shoot at him. Despite getting injured, he returns to Jamaica and takes charge of a ship named The Lady of my Heart.

Later, Cornelius is tasked with a new rum shipment by trafficker Sanderson. However, he stumbles upon a silent film featuring Linda Larue (Brigitte Bardot) and decides to abandon smuggling. Obsessed with finding the actress, Cornelius travels through Gulf of Mexico ports until he coincidentally encounters her on a deserted beach.

== Cast ==
- Brigitte Bardot as Linda Larue
- Lino Ventura as Cornelius von Zeelinga
- Bill Travers as Sanderson
- Clive Revill as Lord Hammond
- La Polaca as Catharina
- Jess Hahn as Piet aka "Big Dutch"
- Antonio Casas as Wilkinson
- Andreas Voutsinas as Alvarez
- Guy Marchand as Ronald / The Actor
- Jack Betts as Renner
- Florence Giorgetti as Linda's guest

== Production ==
The film began shooting in Mexico and the British Honduras in September 1970. The film was also partially shot in Parisian studios and in Andalucia, Spain.

== Reception ==
The New York Times regarded the film as a professional breakthrough for Bardot, deeming it as a signifier of "the death of a star—the last star, perhaps—and the birth of an actress: Brigitte Bardot."

== Soundtrack ==
The score and soundtrack were composed by François de Roubaix, with Bardot lending her vocals to certain songs.

1. Chant des rumrunners / Générique
2. Sur le boulevard du rhum (by Brigitte Bardot)
3. Le jeu de l'aveugle
4. La posada / Gramophone rumba
5. Chanson de Ronald (by Guy Marchand)
6. Ragtime du ver solitaire
7. Bataille navale
8. Tango del patio
9. Linda et Cornelius (Version 1)
10. MacAlister's wedding song I (by Joe Turner)
11. Ben-moor hôtel
12. Au cinéma muet
13. Plaisir d'amour (by Brigitte Bardot and Guy Marchand)
14. Prohibition rag
15. Linda et Cornelius (Version 2)
