= La Bien-aimée =

- Jean-Marc Bory and Michèle Morgan
- Written by: Lucie Faure
- Directed by: Jacques Doniol-Valcroze
- Starring: Michèle Morgan; Paul Guers; Jean-Marc Bory
- Theme music composer: Maurice Leroux
- Country of origin: France
- Original language: French

Production
- Editor: Sophie Bhaud

Original release
- Release: 6 May 1967

La Bien-aimée is a 1967 French television drama directed by Jacques Doniol-Valcroze. It was based on short story "Fanny" by Lucie Faure who wrote screenplay. The music score is by Maurice Leroux. The production designer was Jean d'Eaubonne and the cinematographer was Sacha Vierny.

== Principal cast ==
- Michèle Morgan as Fanny Dréal
- Paul Guers as Albert de Frézac
- Jean-Marc Bory as Jacques Forestier
- Eleonore Hirt as La comtesse de Frézac
- Marc Eyraud as Le père de Mérode
- Nelly Borgeaud as Mme Claude
- Margo Lion as Mme Floirat
- Marianne Comtell as Antoinette
- Florence Giorgetti as Alice
