= The Golden Fish (film) =

1959 film

- Directed by: Edmond Séchan
- Written by: Roger Mauge
- Produced by: Jacques-Yves Cousteau
- Cinematography: Pierre Goupil
- Edited by: Georges Alépée
- Music by: Henri Crolla and André Hodeir
- Distributed by: Columbia Pictures
- Release date: 2 October 1959
- Running time: 19 minutes
- Country: France
- Language: French

The Golden Fish (French: Histoire d'un poisson rouge) is a 1959 French short film directed by Edmond Séchan. It won an Oscar in 1960 for Best Short Subject.

== Plot ==
The film, which has a musical score but no dialogue tells of a boy, a golden fish, and a black cat. The boy leaves school, comes home to his apartment, feeds his bird, and goes out with a glass bottle and two coins. The boy sees his mother walking on the street, and goes to a festival. There a roulette booth offers fish as a prize: an aquarium is stocked with various black fish and one golden fish. The booth's sign says "REGLEMENT Chaque gagnant a droit à un magnifique poisson exotique/les poissons ne sont pas rachetés" (Regulation: Each winner is entitled to a magnificent exotic fish/the fish are not redeemed [for money]). He looks longingly at the golden fish, and at the coins, but doesn't place a bet (Another sign says "20 F la partié"), and leaves. An older man with a beard places his bet on spades, but the wheel lands on 7. The boy comes back, now his bottle filled with milk. The older man bets on spades, 4, 5, 6, 7, wins a bet when the wheel lands on spades. He wants the golden fish, which hides in the rocks. While trying to get the fish, his arm knocks over the boy's bottle, breaking it. The man gives the boy two coins as a consolation. The boy places his bet (on hearts), and wins. The fish swims willingly into the net, and the boy leaves with the fish in a plastic bag.

Later, the cat follows the men with the garbage, the boy goes to school, the mother punches the time clock (clock reads 8:37). While he is gone, the fish jumps out of the bowl, falling on the table. The black cat enters the apartment, returns the fish (using its mouth) to the bowl, and leaves just as the boy comes back, with a plant to put in the fish bowl.

== Cast ==
- Louis Paul as the Boy
- Gilbert Hughes as the Villain
- Jean-Marie Maillols as the Carnival Man

== Other media ==
There were two books related to this film, in French titled Histoire d'un poisson rouge, one with drawings (Gautier-Languereau, Paris, 1961), and a second book with 12 pages containing photographs from the film and a 45 RPM record the story told by Danièle Delorme, released by Phillips (Catalog No. E1E 09.147).

The label "Jazz in Paris" released Henri Crolla's album "Le Long des Rues Compilation" which included two soundtracks from this film, "Lotterie" (Lottery) and "Usine" (Factory).
