= The Lovers' Wind =

1978 film directed by Albert Lamorisse

- Directed by: Albert Lamorisse
- Produced by: Albert Lamorisse
- Narrated by: Manuchehr Anvar
- Cinematography: Guy Tabary
- Edited by: Denise de Casabianca; Claude Lamorisse
- Distributed by: Ministry of Culture and Art
- Release date: 1978
- Running time: 71 minutes
- Country: France
- Language: French

The Lovers' Wind (French: Le Vent des amoureux) is a 1978 French documentary film directed by Albert Lamorisse about the landscape of Iran. Lamorisse was killed in a helicopter crash while filming the documentary, during a helicopter-tour of Iran. His widow and son completed the film, based on his production notes, and released the film eight years later. It was nominated for a posthumous Academy Award for Best Documentary Feature Film.
