= Anwar Superstar =

American rapper

Anwar Superstar, born Anwar Khalil Prescott, is an American hip hop artist. He began rapping at the age of 14 on the streets of Atlantic City, New Jersey.

Anwar’s skills have been compared to some of hip-hop’s most established MCs. Hip-Hop pioneer KRS-One has requested for Anwar to perform alongside him on stage, as well as Lil' Kim, whom he has opened for at NYC’s B.B. Kings. Anwar has also been on tour many times with various artists such as M.O.P., Pharoahe Monch, Kanye West, Common, Cormega, Talib Kweli, and Grammy and Emmy nominated artist Mos Def.

Many have asked how Anwar inherited the name "Superstar". In his own brash words he has said, "I was born that way", but in all actuality the Superstar moniker comes from his mentor, Mos Def. Mos Def declares, "Anwar is a Superstar due in part to the way people naturally gravitate to him and hang on his every word whether he’s on or off the stage."

Anwar's confidence is supported by the fact that he is well rounded musically from being introduced to various music genres at an early age. Anwar incorporates his diverse musical taste into the words he chooses and tracks he selects to express his thoughts. Anwar’s writing talent was noticed early on when he became a published poet as a teenager.

== Guest appearances ==
- "Here Comes The Champ" Featuring Mos Def on ~NBA 2K7: Dan The Automator Presents: NBA 2K7 video game soundtrack~
- "Left Right" · from The Chemical Brothers album Push the Button

== TV/video appearances ==
- PlayStation’s PSP commercial · 2005
- "Oh No" video · Pharohe Monch, Nate Dogg, and Mos Def
- "Brown Sugar" video · Faith Evans and Mos Def

== Tour appearances ==
- PlayStation presents: The Love Breed Odyssey Tour · 2005
- Beats For Peace: with Pharohe Monch, Medusa, Supernatural, Headfake and others.
- Weapons of Mic Destruction: with M.O.P, Pharohe Monch, Pitch Black, Scratch, Cormega and others.
- Mos Def Presents: Mos Def, Talib Kweli, Kanye West, Medina Green, and others

== Mix tapes ==
- Gold Medal Music Presents Anwar SupaStar: Dear Winter · 2005
- The Unreleased Rawkus Records SoundBombing 4
- Mos Def Presents Medina Green You know the flex Volume 1
- various underground releases
