= Believe (The Chemical Brothers song) =

2005 single by the Chemical Brothers

Single by the Chemical Brothers

from the album Push the Button
- B-side: "Giant"; "Spring"
- Released: 2 May 2005
- Genre: Electronic; acid house; rock
- Length: 7:01 (album version)
- Label: Freestyle Dust; Virgin
- Songwriters: Tom Rowlands; Ed Simons; Rowland Okereke
- Producer: The Chemical Brothers

The Chemical Brothers singles chronology
| "Galvanize" (2005) | "Believe" (2005) | "The Boxer" (2005) |

Kele Okereke singles chronology
| "Believe" (2005) | "Tenderoni" (2010) |

Music video
- "Believe" on YouTube

"Believe" is the second single from English electronic music duo the Chemical Brothers' fifth studio album, Push the Button (2005). The single was released on 2 May 2005 and peaked at number 18 on the UK Singles Chart while reaching the top 20 in Italy and Spain. Kele Okereke, lead singer and rhythm guitarist of the indie rock band Bloc Party provides uncredited vocals. A remix of the song was featured in the 2005 snowboarding video "Flavor Country" by Sandbox.

== Composition ==
John Bush from AllMusic described: "[The song] agonizing over an energized electroshock production composed of equal parts Prince and Chicago acid house."

== Critical reception ==
While reviewing Push the Button, Robert Christgau called the song along with "The Big Jump", "rock the block." Thump, "an electronic music and culture channel" from Vice, listed the song as one of the duo's 15 best collaborations, ranked at number 12. Rolling Stone's Bill Werde wrote that "the urgent yelp of Kele Okereke from Bloc Party makes 'Believe' a club-anthem-in-waiting."

== Music video ==
The video was premiered on MTV on 18 March 2005. The music video for the song was directed by Dom and Nic, contains scenes filmed at the now defunct MG Rover Longbridge plant in Birmingham (now owned by SAIC) and different parts of London. It starts out with British actor, Luke Varley watching women in an exercise video dance on a window TV in a London street store, possibly spoofing the then-recent video for Eric Prydz's single "Call on Me" with a woman's face becoming a frumpy middle-aged woman's face possibly screaming; "fuck your pig face". The man turns out to be a paranoid factory worker terrified of the automated assembly robot he operates, possibly under the influence of hallucinogenic drugs or possibly painkillers, as he has a cast on his left arm.

He imagines the machines watching and threatening him, seeing them outside the factory, chasing him before disappearing. Finally, he admits his problem to his supervisor (with The Chemical Brothers seen on a computer monitor behind them) even after quitting his job, the man is pursued at London Underground stations of Maida Vale and Goodge Street, and then from at Tottenham Court Road to the top of a high-rise building by one of the arms, where it lunges at him before disappearing. He runs onto the street, and sees multiple machines lumbering toward him, and his view of the world disintegrates into a mess of geometric shapes and colours. He collapses in a state of disassociate state of fugue, laughing hysterically as robots disappear once again, with the structural honeycombs of the Welbeck Street car park come off psychedelically and then he becomes serious again.

The video won a MTV Europe Music Award for Best Video at its 2005 MTV Europe Music Awards.

== Track listings ==
UK CD1 and European CD single

1. "Believe" (edit) – 3:48
2. "Giant" – 4:32

UK CD2

1. "Believe" (extended version) – 6:20
2. "Spring" – 5:27
3. "Believe" (Erol Alkan's 'Feel Me' re-work) – 6:23
4. "Believe" (video) – 4:22

UK 12-inch single

A1. "Believe" (extended version)
B1. "Galvanize" (Abe Duque remix)
B2. "Giant"

Australian CD single

1. "Believe" (extended version)
2. "Spring"
3. "Believe" (Erol Alkan's 'Feel Me' re-work)

== Charts ==
| Chart (2005) | Peak position |
|---|---|
| Australia (ARIA) | 69 |
| Belgium (Ultratop 50 Flanders) | 48 |
| Belgium (Ultratip Bubbling Under Wallonia) | 11 |
| CIS Airplay (TopHit) | 109 |
| Germany (GfK) | 84 |
| Ireland (IRMA) | 22 |
| Ireland Dance (IRMA) | 1 |
| Italy (FIMI) | 18 |
| Netherlands (Single Top 100) | 90 |
| Russia Airplay (TopHit) | 104 |
| Scottish Singles Sales (Official Charts) | 17 |
| Spain (Promusicae) | 7 |
| Switzerland (Schweizer Hitparade) | 63 |
| UK Singles (Official Charts) | 18 |

== Release history ==
| Region | Date | Format(s) | Label(s) | Ref. |
|---|---|---|---|---|
| Australia | 2 May 2005 | CD | Freestyle Dust; Virgin | |
| United Kingdom | 2 May 2005 | CD | Freestyle Dust; Virgin | |
