= Pour un amour lointain =

- Directed by: Edmond Séchan
- Written by: Jean-Claude Carrière; Edmond Séchan
- Produced by: Vladimir Cosma
- Starring: Jean Rochefort; Cristina Jardim; Isabel Jardim; Julien Guiomar; Jacques Jouanneau
- Music by: Luiz Bonfá
- Distributed by: Les Artistes Associes
- Release date: 23 August 1968 (France)
- Running time: 95 minutes
- Country: France
- Language: French

Pour un amour lointain (English title: For a Distant Love) is a 1968 French romantic comedy film directed by Edmond Séchan.

The cast includes Jean Rochefort in the leading role. It was the feature debut of identical twins Cristina and Isabel Jardim. The film featured a bossa nova score by noted Brazilian composer Luiz Bonfá, which was released as a soundtrack album by Philips.

== Plot ==
Actors Guillaume, Adrien and Maxime are part of a French acting troupe on a Brazilian tour, performing Dom Juan and other Molière plays. Guillaume is a womaniser and becomes fascinated by translator Isabel when signing autographs after a performance in womaniser. She invites the trio to a party hosted by Isabel's father, a prominent architect, and makes her feelings for Guillaume plain. While the party goes on Isabel's twin sister Cristina is upstairs, unable to join in the reception due to a nervous illness that has robbed her of the use of her legs. Nevertheless Guillaume meets her by chance and immediately falls in love with her. As the tour moves on to Brasília and São Paulo he phones Cristina every day. Isabel discovers their blooming relationship and is torn between jealousy over her own feelings for Guillaume and her desire to see her sister happy, especially as the romance has seen Cristina recover and regain her mobility. The tour comes to a close and Guillaume pleads for Cristina to join him when he returns to France. She is unable to contemplate leaving her sister. Eventually Guillaume instead decides to stay in Brazil, bidding farewell to Adrien, Maxime and the rest of the company.

== Cast ==
- Jean Rochefort as Guillame
- Cristina Jardim as Cristina
- Isabel Jardim as Isabel
- Julien Guiomar as Maxime
- Jacques Jouanneau as Adrien
- Henriette Morineau as Aunt

== Release ==
The film was not a financial success, taking only $60,438 at the French box office.
