= One-Eyed Men Are Kings =

1974 film

- Directed by: Michel Leroy; Edmond Séchan
- Written by: Edmond Séchan
- Produced by: Paul Claudon; Edmond Séchan
- Starring: Paul Préboist
- Cinematography: Edmond Séchan
- Music by: François de Roubaix
- Production company: C.A.P.A.C.
- Release date: 1974
- Running time: 15 minutes
- Country: France
- Language: French

One-Eyed Men Are Kings (French: Les... borgnes sont rois) is a 1974 French short film directed by Michel Leroy and Edmond Séchan. It won an Oscar in 1975 for Best Short Subject. The Academy Film Archive preserved One-Eyed Men Are Kings in 2012.

== Cast ==
- Paul Préboist as Léon
- Marie Marc as La mère de Léon
- Lyne Chardonnet
