= Love Is at Stake =

1957 film

- Directed by: Marc Allégret
- Written by: Fernand Vanderem (novel); Odette Joyeux
- Produced by: Joseph Bercholz; Jules Borkon
- Starring: Robert Lamoureux; Annie Girardot; Jacques Jouanneau
- Cinematography: Walter Wottitz
- Edited by: Suzanne de Troeye
- Music by: Louis Bessières
- Production companies: Société des Films Gibe; Lambor Films
- Distributed by: Pathé Consortium Cinéma
- Release date: 27 September 1957
- Running time: 90 minutes
- Country: France
- Language: French

Love Is at Stake (French: L'amour est en jeu) is a 1957 French comedy drama film directed by Marc Allégret and starring Robert Lamoureux, Annie Girardot and Jacques Jouanneau.

The film's sets were designed by the art director Auguste Capelier.

== Cast ==
- Robert Lamoureux as Robert Fayard
- Annie Girardot as Marie-Blanche Fayard
- Jacques Jouanneau as Damiano
- Gabrielle Fontan as Emilie
- Robert Rollis as Le portier
- Pierre Doris as Le publiciste
- Louis Massis as L'huissier
- Leila Croft as Zizi
- Valerie Croft as Zaza
- Jean Parédès as De Bérimont
- Jeanne Aubert as Mme. Brémond
- Yves Noël as Roger Fayard

== Bibliography ==
- Oscherwitz, Dayna & Higgins, MaryEllen. The A to Z of French Cinema. Scarecrow Press, 2009.
