= Drapé (legend) =

French folkloric horse

Lou Drapé
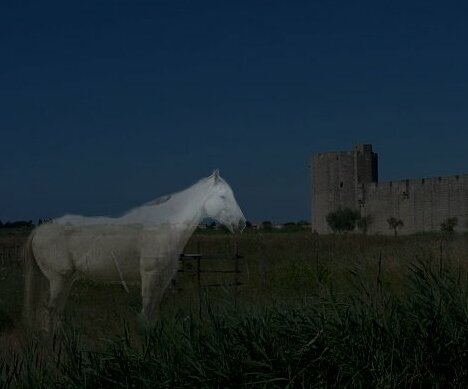
- Representation of Lou Drapé outside the walls of Aigues-Mortes at nightfall

Creature information
- Other name: lo drapet
- Grouping: Popular folklore
- Sub grouping: Horse
- Similar entities: Cheval Drapet, Cheval Gauvin

Origin
- Region: Petite Camargue
- Habitat: Swamps

Lou Drapé (lo drapet in the classical norm of Occitan, lou or lo meaning "the") is a legendary folkloric horse of the town of Aigues-Mortes in the Gard region, in the Petite Camargue marsh area of France. It is said to wander around the walls of the city at night and to take a large number of children on his back to abduct them. These children never return from this journey.

Lou Drapé could be a version of the drac legend of Occitania, an evil creature that can assume the shape of a horse. The image of this ghastly horse is a symbol of death. It is used to scare children, like the bogeyman or the big bad wolf in other regions of France. It is part of an abundant folklore of evil kidnapper horses, which are often linked to water.

== Etymology and terminology ==
According to Frédéric Mistral, drapet or draquet is the name given to a small drac, a small lutin in the Languedoc region. Furthermore, he explains that in Montpellier (fairly close to Aigues-Mortes) drapet can be used to describe a revenant, potentially a ghost "draped" in a shroud, which could explain the connection –and confusion– between the forms drapet-draquet. However, there exists no direct source to explain the name "lou Drapé".

== Legend ==
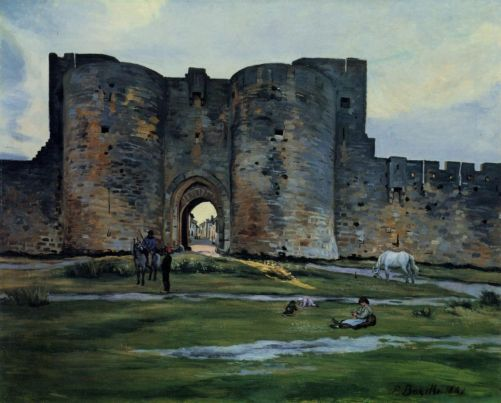
Painting by Frédéric Bazille representing the queens' gates of Aigues-Mortes as they were in the 19th century, at the time of the legend.

Like any piece of folklore, the story of Lou Drapé has been transmitted orally for a long time, however the date of its first appearance remains unknown.

=== Mentions in the 19th century ===
“Lou Drapé" is mentioned in an 1818 text by Jacques-Albin-Simon Collin de Plancy in his book on demonic creatures, the Dictionnaire infernal:

In Aigues-Mortes, the name lou Drapé is given to a mythical horse, the terror of children, thanks to which they remain under their parents’ wing a bit and which prevents the negligence of mothers. It is said that when lou Drapé is out, it gathers all the lost children on its back, one after the other; and that its rump gradually lengthens from a standard size to one long enough to fit fifty and a hundred children, which he then takes who knows where. — Jacques Auguste Simon Collin de Plancy, Dictionnaire infernal

The later editions of the Dictionnaire infernal (1844, 1845 and 1846), which contain revisions compared to the first edition, also mention lou Drapé in the same way.

In 1856, Jacques-Paul Migne provides some additional information in his Encyclopédie théologique, a catholic book co-written with Collin de Plancy:

Mythical horse that the inhabitants of Aigues-Mortes in the Languedoc region use to scare off their children. It is like the Parisians’ croque-mitaine, or the ogre in Charles Perrault’s Tom Thumb. They say that when lou Drapé is wandering in the streets or on the road, it never fails to grab all the lost children and to place them on its back one by one; its rump gradually lengthens as it needs more space, so that it can take fifty and a hundred children at once, if it must. Where does it then take them?! Why, no-one knows; but the little brats cannot expect anything but the whip and stale bread to eat every day. Lou Drapé or the Drapé is not only an object of terror for the children, but the subject of their most serious comments. — Jacques-Paul Migne, Encyclopédie théologique

=== Mentions in the 20th and 21st centuries ===
Collin de Plancy's written version of the story is copied in 19th century books and magazines specialising in folklore (the Revue des traditions populaires for instance).

The Guide de la Provence mystérieuse, published in 1965, says that children at the time were still being threatened with the coming of lou Drapé. In the 1988 esoteric work Les dossiers de l’Histoire mystérieuse, lou Drapé is described as a ghastly big white horse that wanders at night around the walls of Aigues-Mortes, producing a melodious sound with his hooves. As it proceeds, children wake up and leave their houses without a sound. As it passes, lou Drapé gathers the lost children on its back one after the other and takes them away to the marshes of Grau-du-Roi. The destination of the children taken by lou Drapé is different depending on the author. Whilst Bernard Sergent talks of dangerous quicksand and swamps where the children drown, others like Catherine Rager and Édouard Brasey make a connection with the famous film White Mane by evoking a "mysterious faraway kingdom", or an enchanted land where the children subject to the cruelty of Man can live forever with their horse friend.

According to the Société d’Histoire et d’Archéologie d’Aigues-Mortes, "no-one ever knew where it [lou Drapé] took them [the children] and, in fact, no-one has ever wanted to know." The last child to have ridden the horse is said to have freed all the others by screaming "Jesus, Mary, great Saint Joseph!!" and jumping to the ground, which would cause lou Drapé to disappear.

Édouard Brasey adds in La Petite Encyclopédie du merveilleux that just like the horse Bayard, lou Drapé seems to have a back and rump of ordinary size but is able to elongate them.

The Société de mythologie française tells of the existence of a popular nursery rhyme sung by the children of Aigues-Mortes:

Who will ride lou Drapé?
You or me?
The one lou Drapé will take away will be you!

== Origin and symbolism ==
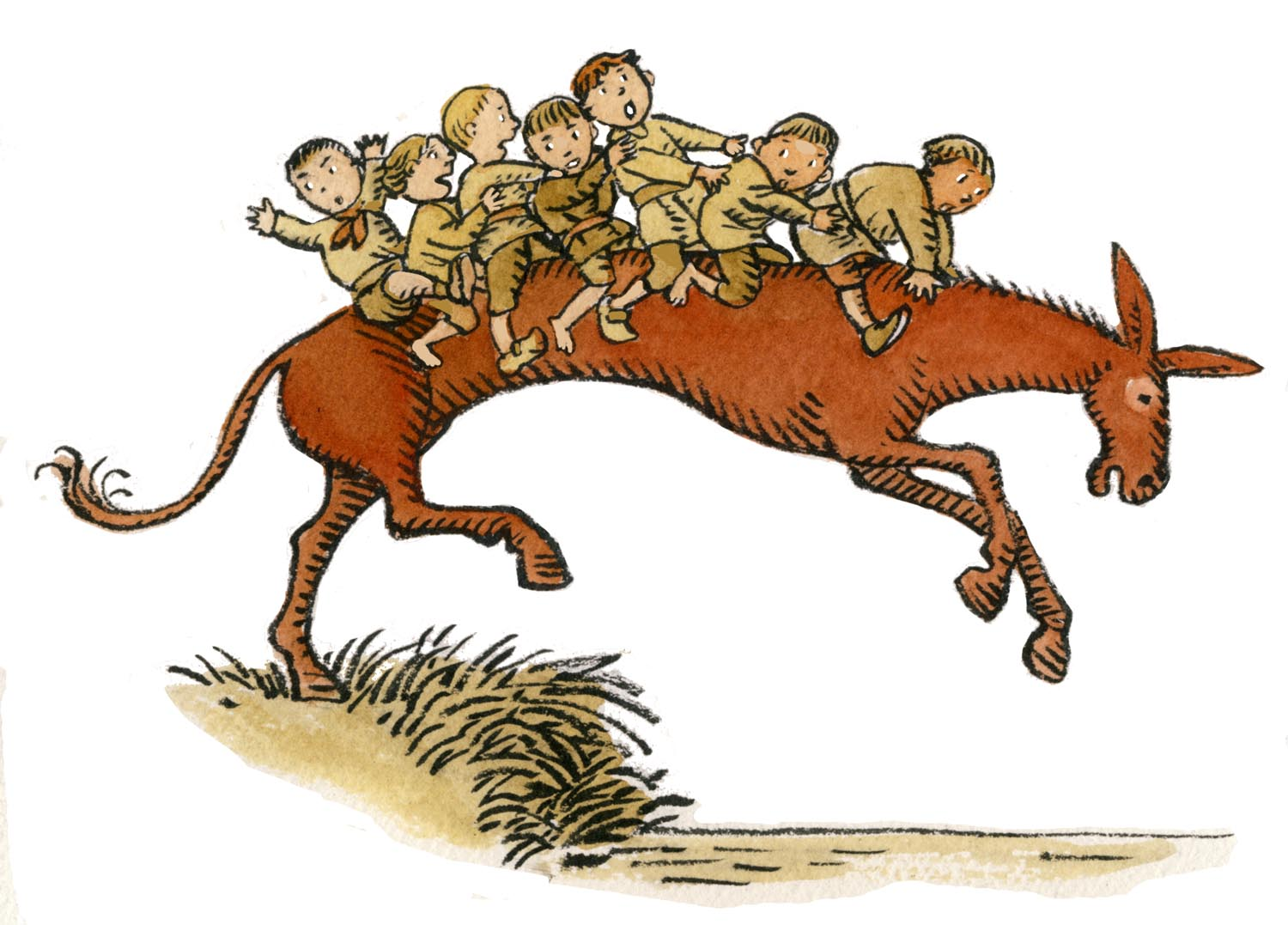
The drac, assuming the shape of a red donkey, on its way to drown careless children.

The particularity of lou Drapé is that it only attacks vagabond children, which makes it, as Collin de Plancy notices, a symbol of the prevention of mothers’ negligence. Its relationship to the croque-mitaine and the ogre (with which it shares the role of "terror of children") has been discussed, notably by anthropologist Nicole Belmont. Furthermore, lou Drapé is specific to the folklore of the town of Aigues-Mortes, where "into marshes flows the terrible Vidourle", known for its devastating floods. For Jacques de Biez, it could have symbolised the courage of the horse when it comes to work, for it "does not care about the work charge. It does its duty.”

=== A version of the drac ===
The exact origins of the Drapé are not known, but this fantastic horse seems to be one of the many versions of the drac of Occitania, that is to say a demon linked to water and its dangers that often assumes the appearance of a donkey or a horse and evokes the Devil. The Dictionnaire des symboles describes the drac as a "beautiful white horse that takes travellers away to drown them in the Doubs", whereas Henri Dontenville speaks of the valley of the Alagnon in the Cantal region, where a river runs "serpentine like a snake". There, the drac takes up residence, turns into a beautiful white horse and obediently lets children and shepherds ride it before drowning them.

=== The water and the little people ===
Japanese folklorists looked at the existing connections between the horse and water creatures to explain the Japanese figure of the kappa. Chiwaki Shinoda underlines how old this association is, which could be explained, according to Kunio Yanagita, by a ritual transformation of the sacrifice of the horse in the liquid element. As early as the Neolithic Age, water genies have been connected to equine beasts. The Dictionnaire des symboles cites a great number of "evil horses, accomplices of swirling waters", mainly in French-German folklore: blanque jument, Bian cheval, Schimmel Reiter, and the drac.

Jean-Michel Doulet notices in his study of changelings that "by the water, the silhouettes of the lutin and the horse tend to get mixed up and merge into one single entity whose role is to lead astray, to scare off and to plunge the ones who ride it into any pond or river". He cites this Aigues-Mortes legend as one of his examples. According to a study on dwarves in the Middle Ages, the links between lutins and fantastic horses are very close for, in the chansons de geste as well as in the more modern folklore, when the little people take the form of an animal, it most often is that of a horse.

Many other horses from French folklore play a similar role in relation to water, as mentioned by elficologist Pierre Dubois in La Grande Encyclopédie des fées. He cites the Guernesey horse, the Albret horse, and the personification of the sea in the shape of a mare in Brittany: most of these “fairy-horses” end up drowning their riders.

=== The lunar whiteness ===
The Dictionnaire des symboles lingers on the whiteness of "ghastly, pale" horses, "nocturnal, lunar, cold and empty" animals, like a shroud or a ghost, which must not be confused with Uranian animals. Their colour evokes grief, like the white steed of the horseman of the Apocalypse, herald of death. According to later versions of the legend, the "lunar" colour white that the Drapé shares with other evil horses –such as the Cheval Mallet– would be the colour of cursed horses.

=== The lengthening rump ===
One of the typical characteristics of lou Drapé is its rump that can be lengthened to allow a great number of children to ride it. It is found in other fairy-horses like Bayard and the blanque jument of the Pas-de-Calais region. According to Henri Dontenville, this characteristic is serpentine, or at least reptilian. In fact, "one only has to look at a snake unrolling or, more simply, a worm to understand the origins of this myth". In a collection of tales by Jean-François Bladé, Pierre Lafforgue reports that a steed carrying three riders and possessing the ability to lengthen its rump is a Cheval Mallet, a form of the Devil which can only be fought by making a sign of the cross and refusing to ride it.

=== Similar legends ===
Legends very close to that of lou Drapé exist. At the trou du Viviès, three kilometres away from Narbonne, a mythical horse with an extensible rump is known to take a great number of children on its back and carry them away forever. There exists a variant with a donkey in Mas-Cabardès. It too can elongate its back to accommodate children. One day it crosses a river carrying a dozen of them and, as it reaches the middle, lets them fall in the water before taking up another form and perching on a nearby rock, laughing at the trick it has just played on them. These two legends are also variants of the drac.

== See also ==
- Camargue horse
- Kelpie
- The Adventures of Ghosthorse and Stillborn
