= The Red Balloon =

1956 film by Albert Lamorisse

- French theatrical release poster
- Directed by: Albert Lamorisse
- Screenplay by: Albert Lamorisse
- Produced by: Albert Lamorisse
- Starring: Pascal Lamorisse
- Cinematography: Edmond Séchan
- Edited by: Pierre Gillette
- Music by: Maurice Le Roux
- Production company: Films Montsouris
- Release dates: 3 May 1956 (Cannes); 19 October 1956 (France)
- Running time: 34 minutes
- Country: France
- Language: French

The Red Balloon (French: Le ballon rouge) is a 1956 French fantasy comedy-drama featurette written, produced and directed by Albert Lamorisse. The 34-minute short, which follows the adventures of a young boy and a sentient, mute red balloon, was filmed in the Ménilmontant neighborhood of Paris.

Lamorisse's son Pascal plays himself in the main role, and his daughter Sabine portrays a young girl.

The film won numerous awards, including an Academy Award for Lamorisse for Best Original Screenplay in 1956 and the Palme d'Or for short films at the 1956 Cannes Film Festival. It also became popular with children and educators. It is the only short film to win the Academy Award for Best Original Screenplay.

The film is considered among the greatest short films in history. It is almost completely wordless, although not silent.

== Plot ==
Pascal Lamorisse, a young boy, discovers a large, helium-filled red balloon on his way to school one morning. As he plays with it, he realizes that the balloon has a mind of its own. The balloon begins to follow him wherever he goes, never straying far, and sometimes floating outside his apartment window as his mother will not allow it inside. As Pascal and the balloon wander through the streets of Paris, they draw attention and envy from other children. At one point, the balloon enters his classroom, causing an uproar among his classmates and alerting the principal, who locks Pascal in his office. Later, after being freed, Pascal and the balloon encounter a young girl with a blue balloon that also seems to have a mind of its own.

One Sunday, Pascal is told to leave the balloon at home while he and his mother attend church. However, the balloon follows them through an open window and into the church, where a scolding beadle leads them out of the building. As Pascal and the balloon continue to explore the neighborhood, a gang of older boys, envious of the balloon, steal it while Pascal is inside a bakery. He retrieves it, but the boys chase him through narrow alleys. They hold Pascal back as they fell the balloon with slingshots and stones before one boy finally destroys it by stomping on it.

All of the other balloons in Paris come to Pascal's aid, lifting him aloft for a cluster balloon ride over the city.

== Cast ==
- Pascal Lamorisse as Pascal - le petit garçon
- Georges Sellier as Le directeur de l'école
- Vladimir Popov as School's handyman
- Paul Perey as Le père de Pascal
- Renée Marion as La grand-mère de Pascal
- Sabine Lamorisse as La petite fille au ballon bleu

== Themes ==
The film, set in post-World War II Paris, features a dark and grey mise-en-scène that adds a somber tone to the setting and mood. In contrast, the bright red balloon serves as a symbol of hope and light. The cluster balloon ride in the final scene can also be interpreted as a religious or spiritual metaphor. For example, when the balloon is destroyed, its "spirit" seems to be embodied by all of the other balloons in the city, which some view as a metaphor for Christ. Themes of self-realization and loneliness are also present. Additionally, the theme of innocence is a central focus, as the film shows how a cynical world is transformed into a magical one through the eyes of a child, highlighting the power of innocence and imagination.

Author Myles P. Breen has identified thematic and stylistic elements in the film that reflect the qualities of poetry. Breen supports this view by quoting film theorist Christian Metz, who states, "In a poem, there is no story line, and nothing intrudes between the author and the reader." Breen categorizes the film as a "filmic poem," partly due to its loose, non-narrative structure.

== Production ==
The film serves as a visual record of the Belleville and Ménilmontant areas of Paris, which had fallen into decay by the 1960s. This decline led the Parisian government to demolish much of the area as part of a slum-clearance effort. While some of the site was rebuilt with housing projects, the rest remained wasteland for 20 years. Many of the locations featured in the film no longer exist, including one of the bakeries, the school, the famous staircase located just beyond the equally famous café Au Repos de la Montagne, the steep steps of passage Julien Lacroix where Pascal finds the balloon and the empty lot where many of the battles take place. Today, the Parc de Belleville stands in that area. However, some locations remain intact, such as the apartment where Pascal lives with his mother at 15 Rue du Transvaal, the Église Notre-Dame-de-la-Croix de Ménilmontant and the Pyrénées-Ménilmontant bus stop at the intersection of Rue des Pyrénées and Rue de Ménilmontant.

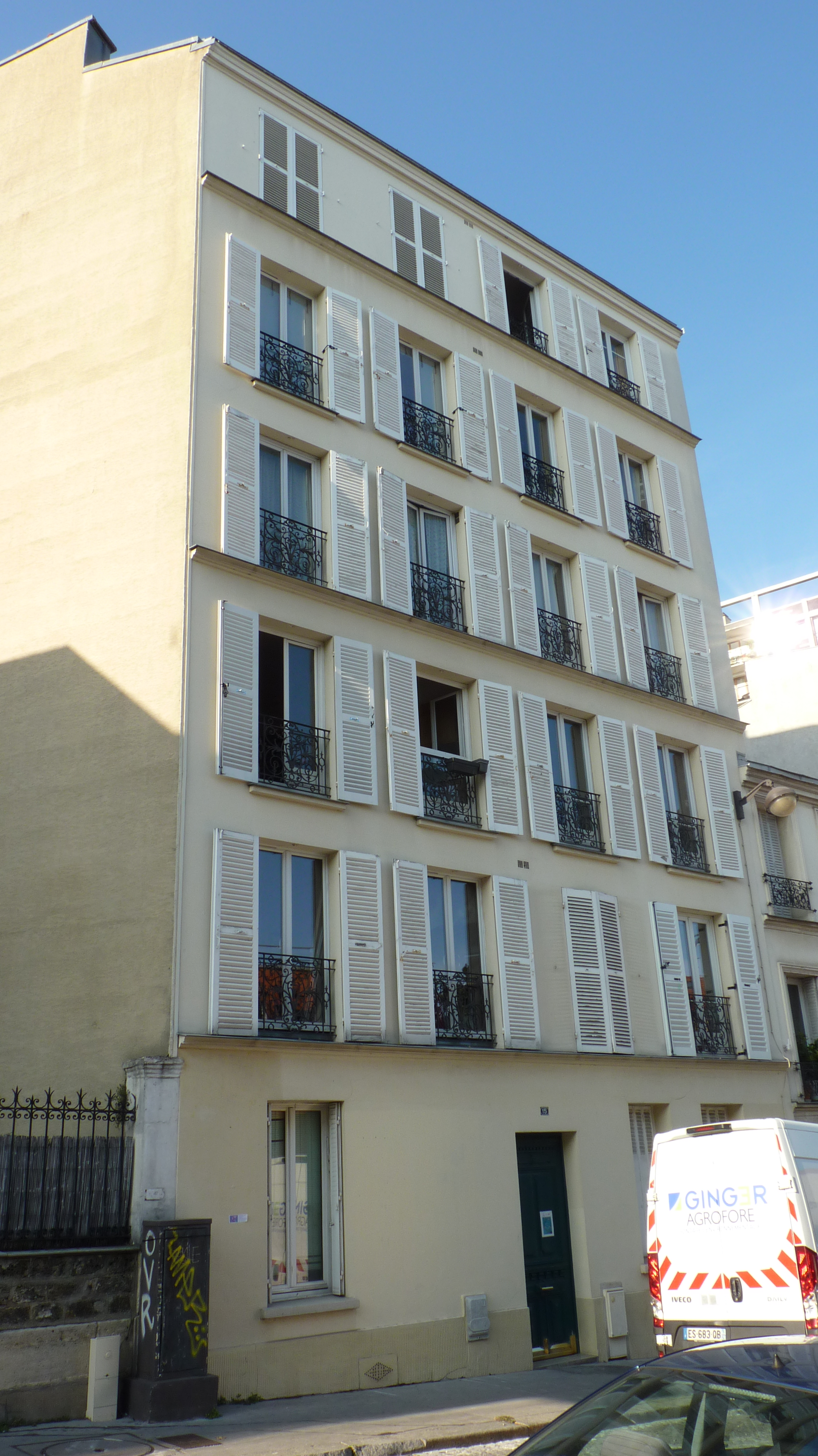
The building hosting Pascal's apartment (15 Rue du Transvaal)

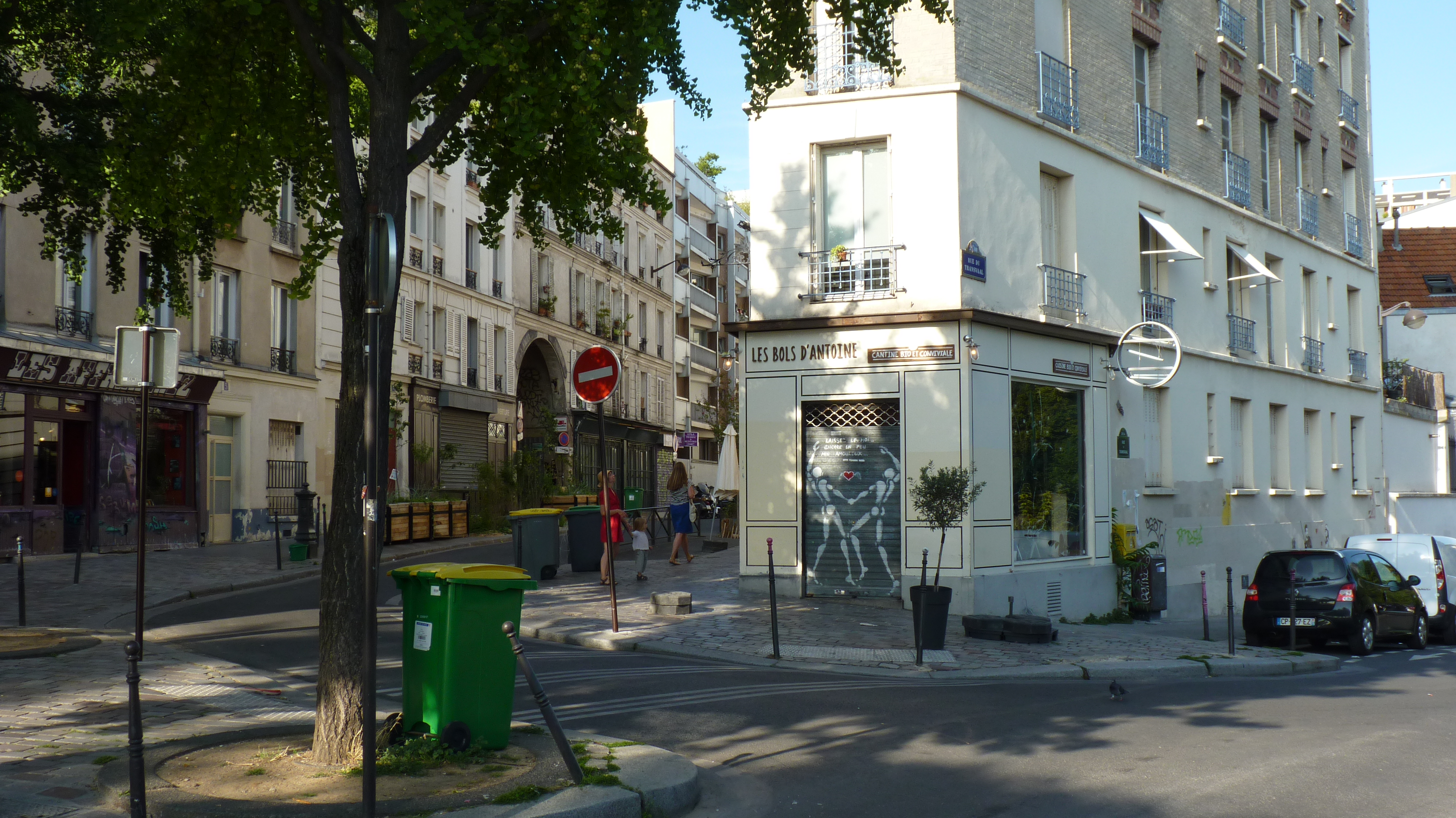
This view is seen in the film. The photo is taken from the side of the building hosting the bakery (intersection of Rue des Envierges and Rue du Transvaal)

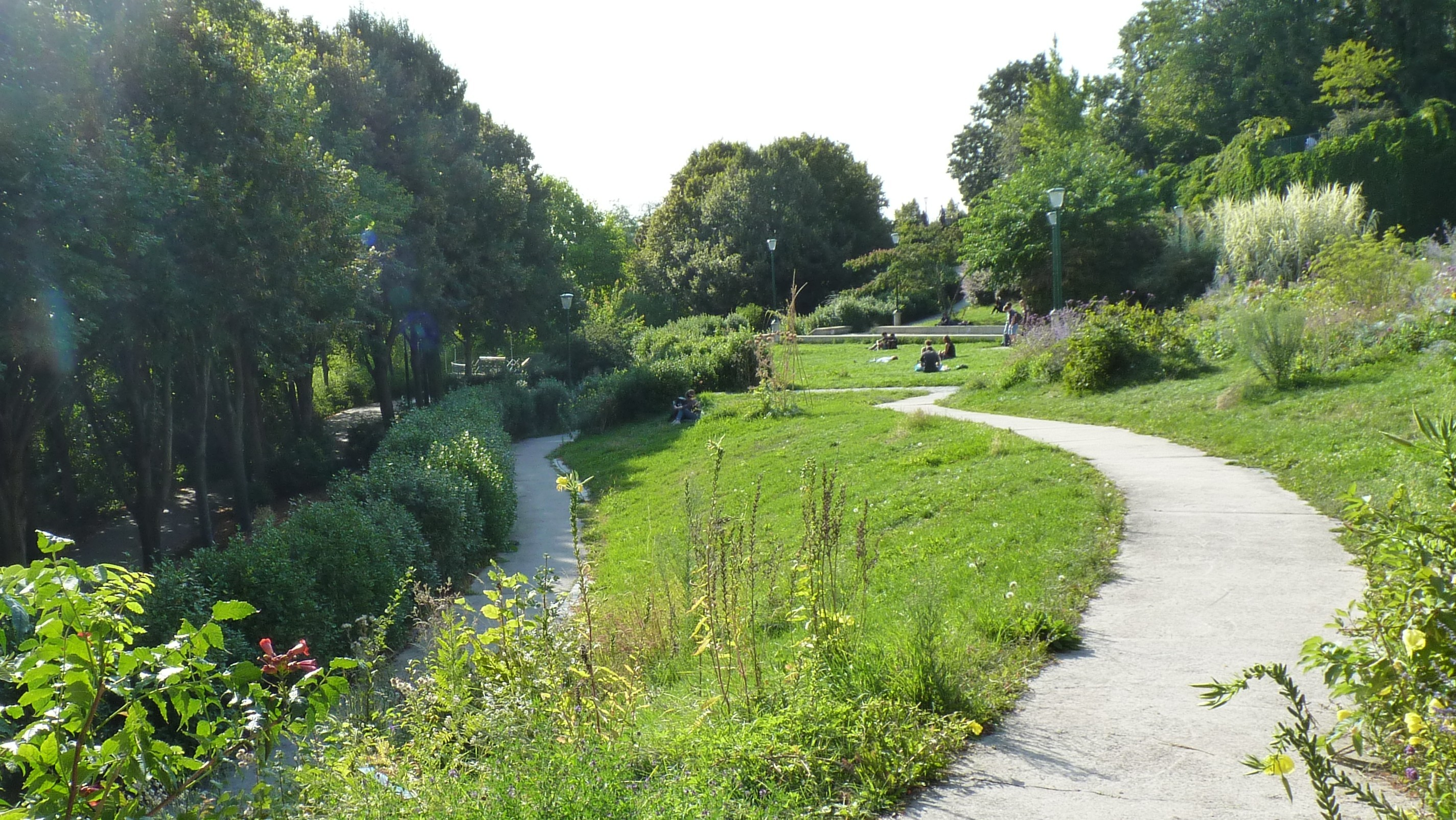
Parc de Belleville

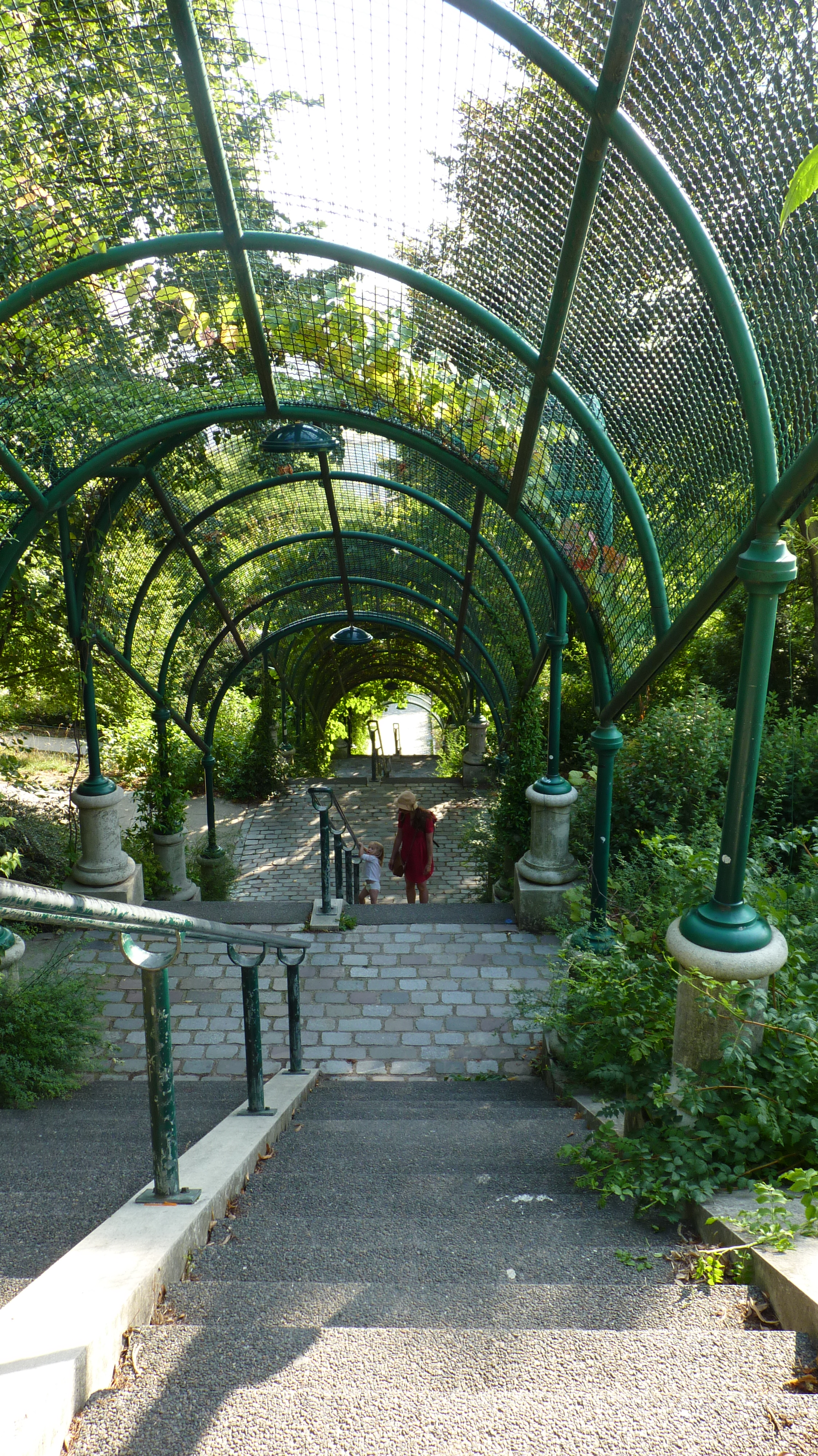
Stairs in the Parc de Belleville

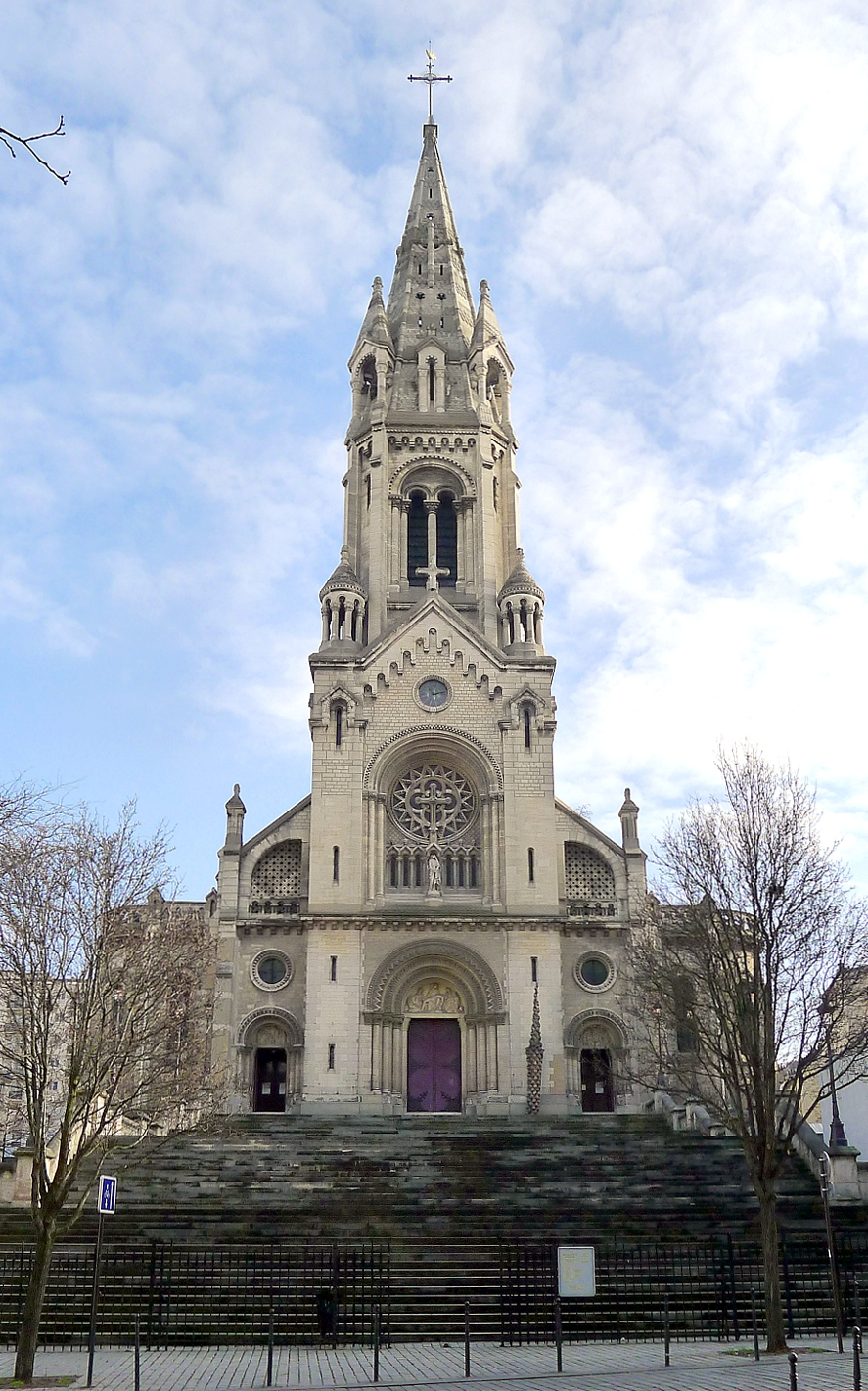
Église Notre-Dame-de-la-Croix de Ménilmontant in Ménilmontant

Lamorisse, a former auditor at the Institut des hautes études cinématographiques (IDHEC), employed a crew composed entirely of IDHEC graduates for the film.

The main role of Pascal is played by Lamorisse's son Pascal. French singer Renaud and his brother appear at the end of the film as twin brothers in red coats. They were cast in the roles through their uncle Edmond Séchan, the film's director of photography.

== Release ==
The film premiered and opened nationwide in France on 19 October 1956 and was released in the United Kingdom on 23 December 1956 (as the supporting film to the 1956 Royal Film Performance feature The Battle of the River Plate, which ensured it a wide distribution) and in the United States on 11 March 1957.

For the film's American television premiere, it was introduced by Ronald Reagan as an episode of the CBS anthology series General Electric Theater in 1961.

=== Reception ===
Since its first release in 1956, the film has generally received overwhelmingly favorable reviews from critics. Bosley Crowther of The New York Times hailed the simple tale and praised director Lamorisse, writing: "Yet with the sensitive cooperation of his own beguiling son and with the gray-blue atmosphere of an old Paris quarter as the background for the shiny balloon, he has got here a tender, humorous drama of the ingenuousness of a child and, indeed, a poignant symbolization of dreams and the cruelty of those who puncture them."

When the film was re-released in the United States in late 2006 by Janus Films, Entertainment Weekly magazine film critic Owen Gleiberman praised its direction and simple story line that reminded him of his youth, and wrote: "More than any other children's film, The Red Balloon turns me into a kid again whenever I see it...[to] see The Red Balloon is to laugh, and cry, at the impossible joy of being a child again."

Film critic Brian Gibson wrote: "So far, this seems a post-Occupation France happy to forget the blood and death of Adolf Hitler's war a decade earlier. But soon people’s occasional, playful efforts to grab the floating, carefree balloon become grasping and destructive. In a gorgeous sequence, light streaming down alleys as children's shoes clack and clatter on the cobblestones, the balloon bouncing between the walls, Pascal is hunted down for his floating pet. Its ballooning sense of hope and freedom is deflated by a fierce, squabbling mass. Then, fortunately, it floats off, with the breeze of magic-realism, into a feeling of escape and peace, The Red Balloon taking hold of Pascal, lifting him out of this rigid, petty, earthbound life."

In a review in The Washington Post, critic Philip Kennicott had a cynical view: "[The film takes] place in a world of lies. Innocent lies? Not necessarily. The Red Balloon may be the most seamless fusion of capitalism and Christianity ever put on film. A young boy invests in a red balloon the love of which places him on the outside of society. The balloon is hunted down and killed on a barren hilltop—think Calvary—by a mob of cruel boys. The ending, a bizarre emotional sucker punch, is straight out of the New Testament. Thus is investment rewarded—with Christian transcendence or, at least, an old-fashioned Assumption. This might be sweet. Or it might be a very cynical reduction of the primary impulse to religious faith."

The review aggregator Rotten Tomatoes reported that 95% of critics gave the film a positive review, based on twenty reviews. The critical consensus reads: "The Red Balloon invests the simplest of narratives with spectacular visual inventiveness, making for a singularly wondrous portrait of innocence."

=== Accolades ===
- Prix Louis Delluc: Prix Louis Delluc; Albert Lamorisse, 1956.
- Cannes Film Festival: Palme d'Or du court métrage/Golden Palm; Best Short Film, Albert Lamorisse, 1956.
- British Academy of Film and Television Arts: BAFTA Award; Special Award, France, 1957.
- Academy Awards: Oscar; Best Writing, Best Original Screenplay, Albert Lamorisse, 1957.
- National Board of Review: Top Foreign Films, 1957.

== Legacy ==
In 1960, Lamorisse released a second film, Stowaway in the Sky, which also starred Pascal and was a spiritual successor to the film.

Bob Godfrey's and Zlatko Grgic's 1979 animated film Dream Doll has a very similar plot and ending to the film, except instead of a boy being obsessed with a red balloon, the protagonist is a man obsessed with an inflatable nude woman.

A stage adaptation by Anthony Clark was performed at the Royal National Theatre in 1996.

Don Hertzfeld's 1997 short film Billy's Balloon, which also showed at Cannes, is a parody of the film.

The music video for "Son of Sam" by Elliott Smith, from his 2000 album Figure 8, is a direct homage to the film.

Hou Hsiao-hsien's 2007 film Flight of the Red Balloon is a direct homage to the film.

A boy with a bright red balloon is featured in the epilogue of Damien Chazelle's 2016 musical film La La Land.

The Pascal and Sabine restaurant in Asbury Park, New Jersey is named in honor of the film.

Guitarist Keith Calmes' album Follow the Red Balloon is named as an homage to the spirit of Pascal and Sabine.

In The Simpsons episode "The Crepes of Wrath", Bart returns from France bearing gifts for his family; his gift to Maggie is a red balloon.

The red ballon appears (in three images on pages 162 and 163) of Jacques Tardi's Du Rififi à Menilmontant (Casterman, 2024), where private investigator Nestor Burma perambulates in the 20ème arrondissement during Christmas season, 1957. This is an original story by Tardi.

== Merchandise ==
=== Home media ===
The film was first released on VHS by Embassy Home Entertainment in 1984. A laserdisc of it was later released by The Criterion Collection in 1986, and was produced by Criterion, Janus Films, and Voyager Press. Included in it was Lamorisse's award-winning short White Mane (1953). A DVD version became available in 2008, and a Blu-ray version was released in the United Kingdom on January 18, 2010; it has now been confirmed as region-free.

=== Book ===
A tie-in book was first published by Doubleday Books, (now Penguin Random House), in 1957, using black and white and color stills from the film, with added prose. It was highly acclaimed and went on to win a 'New York Times Best Illustrated Children's Book of the Year'. Lamorisse was credited as its sole author.
