= Jacques Jouanneau =

French actor

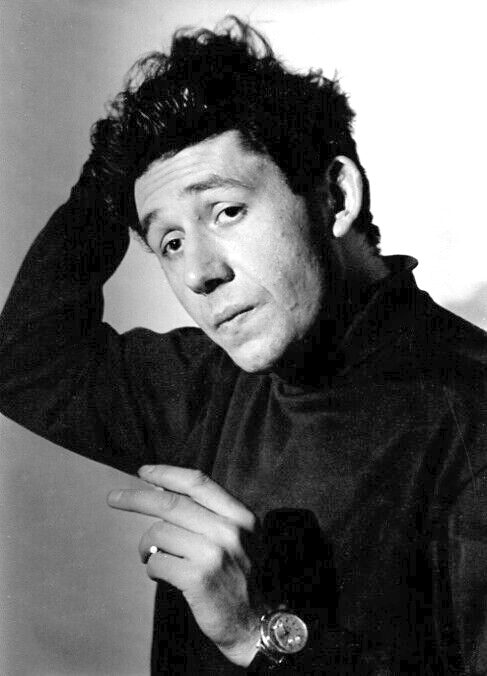
- Born: 3 October 1926; Angers, France
- Died: 19 July 2011 (aged 84); Nîmes, France
- Occupation: Actor
- Years active: 1953–1996

Jacques Jouanneau (3 October 1926 – 19 July 2011) was a French actor. He was born in Angers, France.

== Filmography ==
- 1953: Capitaine Pantoufle - Le barman du Goéland (uncredited)
- 1954: Les Intrigantes - Le Reporter (uncredited)
- 1954: Ah! Les belles bacchantes - Joseph Delmar, le régisseur aux Folies-Méricourt
- 1954: One Step to Eternity - Le flic
- 1955: French Canacan - Bidon
- 1955: Madonna of the Sleeping Cars - Henri - le chauffeur
- 1955: Les Grandes manœuvres - L'ordonnance de Félix
- 1956: The Road to Paradise - Robert
- 1956: Elena et les hommes - Eugène Martin-Michaud
- 1956: En effeuillant la marguerite - Edouard, friend of Daniel
- 1956: Paris, Palace Hôtel - Le laquais de l'entrée
- 1957: Le Colonel est de la revue - Van Molpen
- 1957: Let's Be Daring, Madame - Dédé la Matraque
- 1957: Comme un cheveu sur la soupe - Amédée
- 1957: Love Is at Stake - Damiano
- 1958: The Heartthrob (Le Tombeur) - Edouard "Doudou" Doucin
- 1958: Life Together - Sentis, généalogiste
- 1958: Madame et son auto - Jean Moulin
- 1958: Suivez-moi jeune homme - Chatou
- 1959: Bobosse - Édgar / Léon
- 1959: Witness in the City - Man renting a car to Ancelin
- 1960: Les Distractions (The Distractions) - Maxime
- 1961: Ôtez votre fille s'il vous plaît (TV Movie) - Colardeau
- 1961: Napoleon II, the Eagle - Esterhazy
- 1961: Les Chiuchachas (Short)
- 1962: Le Caporal épinglé - Penche A Gauche
- 1963: Judex - Alfred Cocantin
- 1963: Un coup dans l'aile (TV Movie) - Manouille
- 1964: Les Pieds nickelés - Vergadin
- 1964: Patate - Marcel
- 1965: The Duke's Gold - Le casseur d'autos
- 1967: Astérix le Gaulois - Assurancetourix (voice)
- 1968: Six chevaux bleus (TV Series)
- 1968: Pour un amour lointain - Adrien
- 1969: Le Champion du tiercé (Les Gros malins) - Paul Blanc
- 1969: Tintin et le temple du soleil - (voice)
- 1970: Domicile conjugal - Césarin
- 1970: Les Novices - The Mona Lisa client
- 1971: Le Misanthrope (TV Movie) - Dubois
- 1971: Un enfant dans la ville (TV Movie)
- 1971: Daisy Town - Jack Dalton (voice)
- 1971: Les Pétroleuses - Mons. Letellier
- 1974: Le Permis de conduire - Bastien
- 1974: La Grande nouba - TV reporter
- 1974: Deux grandes filles dans un pyjama - Lionel
- 1974: Par ici la monnaie - Fauxpied
- 1976: René la Canne - Fourgue
- 1976: Larguez les amarres! (TV Movie) - Félicien
- 1977: Le Maestro (The Maestro) - immobilized agent
- 1977: Parisian Life - Alfred
- 1978: Les Bidasses au pensionnat - L'adjudant
- 1978: Messieurs les ronds de cuir (TV Movie) - Boudin
- 1979: Le Cavaleur - Le quincaillier
- 1979: Par devant notaire (TV Movie) - Jacques (segment "Résidence du bonheur, La")
- 1979: Nous maigrirons ensemble - Manuel Orlandi
- 1981: Celles qu'on n'a pas eues - Le mari de la morte
- 1983: Le Retour des bidasses en folie - The general of Lastra
- 1984: Le Cowboy (The Cowboy) - The minister
- 1984: Emmenez-moi au théâtre (TV Series) - Auguste
- 1987: Lily et Lily (Lily and Lily) (TV Movie) - Sam
- 1988: Chouans! - Blaise
- 1991: Triplex - Frank's father
- 1991: Les Clés du paradis - The president of the yacht club
- 1992: Room Service - The viscount Louis
- 1992: Prêcheur en eau trouble (TV Movie) - Dr Martel
- 1992: Tout ou presque (TV Movie)
- 1996: Fallait pas !... - Constance's Father (final film role)
