= Florence Giorgetti =

French actress (1944–2019)

- Born: 15 February 1944; Paris, France
- Died: 31 October 2019 (aged 75); Paris, France
- Occupation: Actress
- Years active: 1962–2019
- Spouse: Pierre Arditi (1968–1979)

Florence Giorgetti (15 February 1944 – 31 October 2019) was a French stage and film actress. She was nominated for the César Award for Best Supporting Actress for her role in The Lacemaker.

She died in October 2019, in her native Paris, aged 75.

== On stage ==
Year	Title	Writer	Director	Notes
1965–66	Les Troyennes	Euripides	Michael Cacoyannis	Chaillot National Theater
1968	La Moitié du plaisir	Steve Passeur; Jean Serge; Robert Chazal	Robert Hossein	Théâtre Antoine-Simone Berriau
1969	Je ne pense qu'à ça	Georges Wolinski	Claude Confortès	Théâtre Gramont
1970	Jarry sur la butte	Alfred Jarry	Jean-Louis Barrault	Élysée Montmartre
1971	The Cherry Orchard	Anton Tchekhov	Pierre Debauche	Maison de la Culture Nanterre
1972	Outrage au public	Peter Handke	Christian Dente	Petit Odéon
1973	Smoking ou Les Mauvais Sentiments	Jean-Pierre Bisson	Jean-Pierre Bisson	Paris Automn Festival
1974–75	Cesare 1950	Jean-Pierre Bisson	Jean-Pierre Bisson (2)	Festival d'Avignon; Théâtre de Nice
1980	Steak house	Victor Haïm	Victor Haïm	
1981	Oh ! Scapin L'Impromptu de Marseille	Marcel Maréchal based on Molière	Marcel Maréchal	Théâtre de la Criée
1983	Ariakos	Philippe Minyana	Jean-Christian Grinevald; Christian Schiaretti	Théâtre du Quai de la Gare
1984	Chapitre II	Neil Simon	Pierre Mondy	Théâtre Édouard VII
1987	Inventaires	Philippe Minyana	Dominique Bertola; Robert Cantarella; Philippe Minyana	Théâtre de la Criée
1989	Les Petits Aquariums	Philippe Minyana	Robert Cantarella (2)	Théâtre national de la Colline
1990	Le Voyage	Henri Bernstein	Robert Cantarella (3)	Théâtre 13; Théâtre de Nice
1990–91	L'Ourse blanche	Daniel Besnehard	Claude Yersin	Théâtre Paris-Villette
1992	Le Siège de Numance	Miguel de Cervantes	Robert Cantarella (4)	Festival d'Avignon
1992	Sourire des mondes souterrains	Lars Norén	Robert Cantarella (5)	Théâtre national de la Colline
1993	Le Renard du nord	Noëlle Renaude	Robert Cantarella (6)	Théâtre 13; Théâtre Ouvert
1994	Visiteurs	Botho Strauss	Michel Didym; René Loyon	Théâtre de la Ville
1995	Sa maison d’été	Jane Bowles	Robert Cantarella (7)	Théâtre national de la Colline; Théâtre du Port de la lune
1998	Samedi dimanche et lundi	Eduardo De Filippo	Robert Cantarella (8)	Théâtre du Gymnase; Théâtre de Nice
1999	Anne-Laure et les fantômes	Philippe Minyana	Robert Cantarella (9)	Théâtre Gérard Philipe
1999	Grand et petit	Botho Strauss	Robert Cantarella (10)	Théâtre Gérard Philipe
2000	Du matin à minuit	Georg Kaiser	Robert Cantarella (11)	Théâtre national de la Colline; Nouveau Théâtre d'Angers
2000–2001	Madame Ka	Noëlle Renaude	Florence Giorgetti	Théâtre Dijon-Bourgogne; Nouveau Théâtre d'Angers; Théâtre des Abbesses
2002	La Mouette	Anton Tchekhov	Philippe Calvario	Théâtre National de Bretagne; Place des Célestins; Théâtre des Bouffes du Nord
2003	Dynamo	Eugene O'Neill	Robert Cantarella (12)	Théâtre Dijon-Bourgogne; Théâtre national de la Colline
2004	Roberto Zucco	Bernard-Marie Koltès	Philippe Calvario (2)	Comédie de Reims; Théâtre des Bouffes du Nord
2004	Le Chemin de Damas	August Strindberg	Robert Cantarella (13)	Théâtre Dijon-Bourgogne; National Theatre of Strasbourg; Théâtre national de la Colline
2005–06	Richard III	William Shakespeare	Philippe Calvario (3)	Théâtre Nanterre-Amandiers; Théâtre des Célestins; Théâtre National de Bretagne; Théâtre national de Nice; Tour
2006	Électre	Sophocles	Philippe Calvario (4)	Théâtre Nanterre-Amandiers; Théâtre du Gymnase; Théâtre national de Nice; Tour
2008	Voilà	Philippe Minyana	Florence Giorgetti (2)	Comédie de Reims; Théâtre du Rond-Point; Tour
2011	Les Rêves de Margaret	Philippe Minyana	Florence Giorgetti (3)	Théâtre des Abbesses; Théâtre des Treize Vents; Tour
2012	La Petite Maison	Noëlle Renaude	Robert Cantarella (14)	Scène nationale Évreux-Louviers
2013	Inventaires	Philippe Minyana	Robert Cantarella (15)	Théâtre de poche Montparnasse

== Filmography ==
Year	Title	Role	Director	Notes
1962	Le bureau des mariages		Yannick Bellon	Short
1966	Illusions perdues		Maurice Cazeneuve	TV mini-series
1966	Massacre pour une orgie	Florence	Jean-Pierre Bastid	
1967	La Bien-aimée	Alice	Jacques Doniol-Valcroze	TV movie
1967	Jerk à Istambul	A coach	Francis Rigaud	
1967	Les habits noirs	Marguerite Sadoulas	René Lucot	TV series (6 episodes)
1967	Souffle de minuit	Alice	André Fey	TV movie
1968	En votre âme et conscience		Jean Bertho	TV series (2 episodes)
1969	Le profanateur	Amata	Edmond Tiborovsky	TV movie
1970	Les saintes chéries		Jean Becker	TV series (1 episode)
1970	Les aventures de Zadig	Azora	Claude-Jean Bonnardot	TV movie
1971	Le voyageur des siècles	The young nurse	Jean Dréville	TV mini-series (1 episode)
1971	La cavale	A prisoner	Michel Mitrani	
1971	Boulevard du Rhum	Linda's guest	Robert Enrico	
1972	Irma la Douce	A prostitute	Paul Paviot	TV movie
1972	La fin et les moyens	Aline	Paul Paviot (2)	TV movie
1972	Je, tu, elles...		Peter Foldes	
1973	La Grande Bouffe	Anne	Marco Ferreri	
1973	Une saison dans la vie d'Emmanuel		Claude Weisz	
1974	Moi je veux voir la mer...	Jeanne	Christian-Paul Arrighi	
1974	Sarcelles-sur-Mer	Arlette	Patrick Martin	TV movie
1974	L'alchimiste		Jean-Marie Coldefy	TV movie
1974	La voleuse de Londres	Catherine	Marcel Cravenne	TV movie
1975	Au théâtre ce soir	Françoise Bribant	Georges Folgoas	TV series (1 episode)
1975	Jack	Clarisse	Serge Hanin	TV series (4 episodes)
1975	Le gitan		José Giovanni	
1976	Calmos	A traveler	Bertrand Blier	
1976	Oublie-moi, Mandoline	Jocelyne	Michel Wyn	
1976	Adios	Colette Ruisseau	André Michel	TV mini-series
1977	Autopsie d'un monstre	A secretary	André Cayatte	
1977	The Lacemaker	Marylène	Claude Goretta	Nominated - César Award for Best Supporting Actress
1977	Un amour de sable	Danielle	Christian Lara	
1978	Flashing Lights	Monique Raymond	Jacques Scandelari	
1978	L'amour en question	Gisèle Polmi	André Cayatte (2)	
1978	Les Cinq Dernières Minutes	Gaby	Claude Loursais	TV series (1 episode)
1979	Au bout du bout du banc	Brigitte	Peter Kassovitz	
1979	Melancoly Baby	Claire	Clarisse Gabus	
1979	Subversion	Simone	Stanislav Stanojevic	
1979	L'extraordinaire ascension de Maurice Bellange	The mother	Bruno Decharme	Short
1980	Un escargot dans la tête	Hélène	Jean-Étienne Siry	
1980	L'homme en fuite	Elisabeth	Simon Edelstein	
1981	San-Antonio ne pense qu'à ça	The theater's director	Joël Séria	
1981	Pourquoi pas nous?	Marie-Claude	Michel Berny	
1981	Le loup	Mme Laville	Youri	TV movie
1982	Nestor Burma, détective de choc	Madeleine Souldre	Jean-Luc Miesch	
1982	Le petit théâtre d'Antenne 2	Eva	Jérôme Habans	TV series (1 episode)
1982	Quatre acteurs à bout de souffle	Eva	Jérôme Habans (2)	TV movie
1982	Cinéma 16	Marie-Claire	Hélène Misserly	TV series (1 episode)
1983	Médecins de nuit		Emmanuel Fonlladosa	TV series (1 episode)
1983	Prends ton passe-montagne, on va à la plage	Mlle Satcher	Eddy Matalon	
1983	Les amours romantiques		Agnès Delarive	TV series (1 episode)
1983	Attention une femme peut en cacher une autre!	Zelda	Georges Lautner	
1984	Les parents ne sont pas simples cette année	Pauline	Marcel Jullian	
1984	Cinéma 16	Sonia	François Dupont-Midi	TV series (1 episode)
1985	Escalier C	Charlotte	Jean-Charles Tacchella	
1985	Les Cinq Dernières Minutes	Nina Meinhart	Joannick Desclers	TV series (1 episode)
1986	Pepe Carvalho		Adolfo Aristarain	TV series (1 episode)
1986	Cinéma 16	Martine	Youri (2)	TV series (1 episode)
1987	Les enquêtes du commissaire Maigret	Gigi	Maurice Frydland	TV series (1 episode)
1987	Série noire	The grocer	Pierre Grimblat	TV series (1 episode)
1987	Papillon du vertige	Flora Grey	Jean-Yves Carrée	
1987	Les Cinq Dernières Minutes	Medical examiner's wife	Joannick Desclers (2)	TV series (1 episode)
1988	Once More	Sybèle	Paul Vecchiali	
1988	Palace	Edmonde	Jean-Michel Ribes	TV series (1 episode)
1989	Le masque	Suze	Roger Kahane	TV series (1 episode)
1991	Les Cinq Dernières Minutes	Fiorina	Maurice Frydland (2)	TV series (1 episode)
1991	Mamie by Night: Marathon Girl	Geneviève	Bernard Dumont	TV movie
1992	La petite amie d'Antonio	The mother	Manuel Poirier	
1995	La mondaine	Lise	Maurice Frydland (3)	TV series (1 episode)
1995	Terres gelées	Paulette	Maurice Frydland (4)	TV movie
1996	Il faut que je l'aime	Voice	Sébastien Lifshitz	Short
1997	Et si on faisait un bébé?	Catherine	Christiane Spiero	TV movie
1998	Une minute de silence	Cabaret woman	Florent Emilio Siri	
1998	L'examen de minuit	Women of the library	Danièle Dubroux	
1999	Les terres froides	Madame Chamblasse	Sébastien Lifshitz (2)	TV movie
2000	En vacances	Colette Bertini	Yves Hanchar	
2000	Le baptême du boiteux	Mme Fargeon	Paule Zajdermann	TV movie
2001	Navarro	Mme Mongeot-Fleury	José Pinheiro	TV series (1 episode)
2003	La crim	Françoise Keller	Laurent Levy	TV series (1 episode)
2004	Viva Laldjérie	The visionary	Nadir Moknèche	
2006	Le Dernier des fous		Laurent Achard	
2020	My Best Part (Garçon chiffon)		Nicolas Maury	
