= Circus Angel =

- Promotional Poster
- Directed by: Albert Lamorisse
- Written by: Albert Lamorisse
- Produced by: Albert Lamorisse
- Starring: Philippe Avron
- Cinematography: Maurice Fellous; Pierre Petit
- Music by: Jean-Michel Defaye
- Distributed by: Films Montsouris
- Release date: 27 October 1965
- Running time: 80 minutes
- Country: France
- Language: French

Circus Angel (French: Fifi la plume) is a 1965 French fantasy film directed and produced by Albert Lamorisse.

== Plot ==
A burglar joins the circus to escape the police. Yet, he continues his thefts during his off-hours and gets involved in the problems of people around him, while also romancing one of the other circus performers.

== Cast ==
- Philippe Avron as Fifi
- Pierre Collet
- Raoul Delfosse
- Georges Guéret
- Henri Lambert
- Mireille Nègre as The Girl

== Awards ==
Wins

- 1965 Cannes Film Festival: Technical Grand Prize.

Nominations

- Cannes Film Festival: Golden Palm; 1965.
