= Stowaway in the Sky =

- U.K. Theatrical Poster
- Directed by: Albert Lamorisse
- Written by: Albert Lamorisse
- Produced by: Albert Lamorisse
- Narrated by: Jack Lemmon
- Cinematography: Maurice Fellous; Guy Tabary
- Edited by: Pierre Gillette
- Music by: Jean Prodromidès
- Production company: Jalem Productions (US presenter)
- Distributed by: Films Montsouris; Lopert Pictures Corporation
- Release dates: 14 September 1960 (France); 18 June 1962 (U.S.)
- Running time: 85 minutes
- Country: France
- Language: French

Stowaway in the Sky (French: Le Voyage en ballon) is a 1960 French family adventure film, in Dyaliscope and Eastman Color, directed by Albert Lamorisse.

Albert Lamorisse used his ten-year-old son Pascal as the main character in the film.

== Plot ==
The film tells the story of Pascal, a small child who is fascinated by his grandfather's lighter-than-air balloon. The older man claims he has invented the best mode of transportation: a balloon that can be controlled when in the sky. The altitude, direction, and speed of the balloon are all under the direction of the pilot.

As the grandfather takes the balloon on a demonstration, Pascal climbs on board and lifts them both upward to an adventure. The balloon travels all around France, Brittany, over the ocean, and over Mont Blanc in the Alps.

However, the balloon turns out to be not so controllable: church spires become objects of threat, factory smokestacks become volcano-like, a stag hunt is no longer about the thrill of the chase, and they inadvertently kidnap washing on a clothesline and a guest at a wedding party in Brittany.

The land-bound adults have conniptions as the balloon wafts by, but Pascal has a great time.

== Background ==
Jack Lemmon was so impressed with the film after he saw it at the Venice Film Festival in 1960, that he bought the American rights through his film production company, Jalem Productions, in January 1962. Lemmon recorded a new English narration and Jalem Productions acted as presenter (with Lopert Pictures distributing) for its American release in June 1962.

== Cast ==
- Pascal Lamorisse as Pascal
- Maurice Baquet as Le mécanicien
- André Gille as Le grand-père (grandfather)
- Jack Lemmon as Narrator (English version narrator)

== Critical reception ==
In a brief film review of the film the weekly news magazine Time wrote, "Stowaway in the Sky will enchant moppet, matron and greybeard with its breath-catching, balloonist's-eye view of the fair land of France."

== Awards ==
Wins

- Venice Film Festival: OCIC Award; Le Voyage en ballon; 1960.

Nominations

- Venice Film Festival: Golden Lion; Le Voyage en ballon; 1960.
