= Najat Aatabou =

Moroccan singer, songwriter and composer (born 1960)

Najat Aâtabou
- نجاة اعتابو
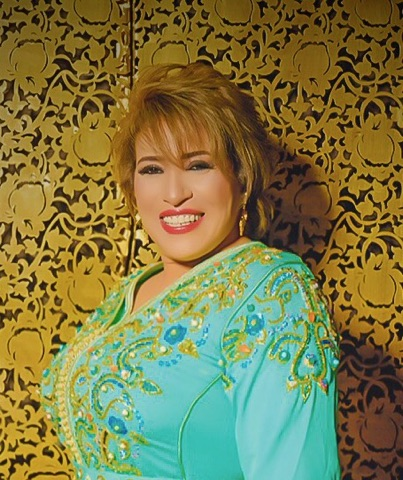
- Born: 9 May 1960 (age 66); Khemisset, Morocco
- Occupations: Singer, Songwriter, Composer
- Known for: Hadi Kedba Bayna
- Spouse: Hassan Dikouk

Najat Aâtabou (Arabic: نجاة اعتابو; born 1960) is a Moroccan singer, songwriter and composer.

Her song "Goul El Hak El Mout Kaina" was sampled by the Chemical Brothers in their 2004 song "Galvanize".

== Early life ==
Najat Aâtabou was born in Khemisset, Morocco on 9 May 1960, into a lower-class family, with five brothers and four sisters. She dreamed of becoming a lawyer, but her life would take a different direction. Singing was her favourite activity and she would walk to school every morning singing songs. When she reached the age of thirteen, she would sneak out of her bedroom window and sing at local weddings and school parties for money. At one of these parties, a friend recorded her voice with a tape recorder. The tape was sold illegally throughout Morocco and the song "J'en ai marre" ("I've had enough of it" in French) became quite popular.

However, her family soon found out about her job, and did not accept her vocation for music with a possible singing career for her. Her brothers threatened to kill her if she continued. So she was afraid and decided to run away from home. She fled to the local music shop, which was her first choice because "they played music there", as she later said. That day a coincidence happened. A famous Moroccan music producer, Mustapha El Mils, walked into the shop, looking for Najat Aâtabou after he had heard the song "J'en ai marre". He asked for her trust and to join him in Casablanca, another Moroccan city. Having no choice, she left for Casablanca, where she would stay for three years, living with the mother of the music producer. After these three years, her family found her and eventually accepted her choice to stay there.

== Career ==
As a singer and songwriter of Chaabi music, she has told stories about Moroccan women and tried to improve their situation. In 1992 she scored her biggest hit, "Hedi Kedba Bayna", which is about a woman whose husband is cheating on her. The title in Moroccan Arabic literally means "This Lie is Obvious".

Another song of hers, "Choufi Ghirou", is about women who are in a relationship with married men, and in Morocco it is illegal to have such a relationship. It was released in 1984 and means in Arabic "Go Find Another Guy". Her songs have evoked social and political discussion in Morocco and brought improvements on feminist issues. She sings in Moroccan Arabic, Berber and French languages.

She is also one of the subjects of the film "Morocco Swings", which is about two generations of Moroccan singers.

== Personal life ==
Najat Aâtabou is married to Moroccan music producer Hassan Dikouk and has three children. She currently resides in Paris.

== Albums ==
- 1991: The Voice of the Atlas (Globe Style)
- 1997: Country Girls & City Women (Rounder/Universal)
- 1998: Najat Aâtabou (La Fa Mi)
- 2001: La Diva marocaine (La Fa Mi)
