= Galvanize (song) =

2004 single by the Chemical Brothers

Single by the Chemical Brothers

from the album Push the Button
- B-side: "Electronic Battle Weapon 7"; "Rize Up"
- Released: 22 November 2004
- Studio: The Hit Factory (New York City)
- Genre: Hip-hop; dance-pop; breakbeat
- Length: 6:33 (album version); 4:28 (UK radio edit); 3:11 (radio edit)
- Label: Freestyle Dust; Virgin
- Songwriters: Ed Simons; Kamaal Fareed; Tom Rowlands; Najat Aatabou
- Producer: The Chemical Brothers

The Chemical Brothers singles chronology
"Get Yourself High" (2003)	"Galvanize" (2004)	"Believe" (2005)

Alternative cover
- CD2

Music video
- "Galvanize" on YouTube

"Galvanize" is a song by British electronic music duo the Chemical Brothers featuring vocals by American rapper Q-Tip. It was released on 22 November 2004 as the first single from their fifth studio album, Push the Button (2005).

The song peaked at No. 3 on the UK Singles Chart on 23 January 2005. It was the Chemical Brothers' highest-charting single in their native United Kingdom since "Hey Boy Hey Girl", which had also reached No. 3 in 1999, and was their last top-10 entry until "Go" reached number seven in 2026. The song peaked at No. 1 in Greece and Spain. In Australia, it was ranked No. 65 on Triple J's Hottest 100 of 2004.

== Composition ==
The track features a distinct Moroccan Chaabi music string sample from Najat Aatabou's 1992 song "Hadi Kedba Bayna" ("This Lie is Obvious" in Moroccan Arabic). The main hook of the song is in 6/4 time signature, while the rest is in 4/4. The track also features rapping by Q-Tip (member of A Tribe Called Quest). In part of the song, a sample from the duo's first single "Leave Home", released in 1995, is played.

== Critical reception ==
Pitchfork Media's Scott Plagenhoef stated the song along with "The Boxer" "harks back to the duo's early B-Boy/techno days" but missed "the ferocity and sub-bass rattlings of their earlier cousins, and here play second fiddle to unremarkable verses and nasally vocals".

It won the Grammy Award for Best Dance Recording in February 2006.

== Music video ==
The music video was shot in Málaga, Spain in November 2004, and directed by Adam Smith.

The video begins with a North African boy painting his face to resemble a clown. He sneaks out of his house, where he meets two friends who also have their faces painted like clowns. The three boys encounter an older group of boys who mock and harass them. One of the younger boys antagonises the older boys with a bras d'honneur, which causes the older boys to chase after the younger boys. The younger boys escape on a bus, and an older couple sitting on the bus give disgusted looks at the boys for their makeup. The boys exit the bus and sneak into a club while security is distracted, arguing with a woman. Inside the club, the boys watch two people in a dance battle. The boys spot two menacing men entering the club, and the boys hide within the crowd of people. One of the boys gets involved in a dance battle with one of the dancers. The boys are caught and escorted out of the club by the two men where the boys are handed over to the police and driven away in a police car. The video is primarily shot in black and white; however, the scenes in the club are shot in colour.

== Track listings ==
- UK CD1
1. "Galvanize"
2. "Rize Up"
- UK CD2
1. "Galvanize"
2. "Galvanize" (extended version)
3. "Electronic Battle Weapon 7"
4. "Galvanize" (video)
- UK and US 12-inch single

A. "Galvanize" (extended version)
B. "Electronic Battle Weapon 7"

- Australia CD single
1. "Galvanize"
2. "Galvanize" (extended version)
3. "Electronic Battle Weapon 7"
- US CD single
1. "Galvanize" (extended version)
2. "Rize Up"
3. "Electronic Battle Weapon 7"
- Japanese CD EP
1. "Galvanize" (single edit) – 4:27
2. "Galvanize" (extended version) – 7:31
3. "Galvanize" (Abe Duque remix) – 7:32
4. "Rize Up" – 4:05
5. "Electronic Battle Weapon 7" – 7:26
6. "Galvanize" (video)

== Charts ==
=== Weekly charts ===
Weekly chart performance for "Galvanize"
Chart (2004–2005)	Peak position
Australia (ARIA)	38
Austria (Ö3 Austria Top 40)	14
Belgium (Ultratop 50 Flanders)	13
Belgium (Ultratip Bubbling Under Wallonia)	2
CIS Airplay (TopHit)	22
Denmark (Tracklisten)	4
Europe (Eurochart Hot 100)	4
Finland (Suomen virallinen lista)	4
France (SNEP)	68
Germany (GfK)	8
Greece (IFPI)	1
Hungary (Dance Top 40)	28
Ireland (IRMA)	6
Ireland Dance (IRMA)	1
Italy (FIMI)	2
Netherlands (Dutch Top 40)	10
Netherlands (Single Top 100)	11
New Zealand (Recorded Music NZ)	19
Norway (VG-lista)	9
Russia Airplay (TopHit)	18
Scottish Singles Sales (Official Charts)	2
Spain (Promusicae)	1
Sweden (Sverigetopplistan)	19
Switzerland (Schweizer Hitparade)	34
UK Singles (Official Charts)	3
UK Dance (Official Charts)	1
US Dance Club Songs (Billboard)	12
US Dance Singles Sales (Billboard)	3

=== Year-end charts ===
Year-end chart performance for "Galvanize"
Chart (2005)	Position
Austria (Ö3 Austria Top 40)	64
Belgium (Ultratop 50 Flanders)	76
CIS Airplay (TopHit)	48
Europe (Eurochart Hot 100)	35
Germany (Media Control GfK)	42
Italy (FIMI)	32
Netherlands (Dutch Top 40)	99
Russia Airplay (TopHit)	42
UK Singles (OCC)	55
US Dance Singles Sales (Billboard)	14
Venezuela (Record Report)	10

== Certifications ==
Certifications and sales for "Galvanize"
Region	Certification	Certified units/sales
Australia (ARIA)	Platinum	70,000^{‡}
New Zealand (RMNZ)	Gold	15,000^{‡}
United Kingdom (BPI)	Platinum	600,000^{‡}
United States (RIAA)	Gold	500,000^{‡}
^{‡} Sales+streaming figures based on certification alone.

== Release history ==
Release dates and formats for "Galvanize"
Region	Date	Format(s)	Label(s)	Ref.
United States	22 November 2004	Digital download	Virgin; Astralwerks	
Australia	17 January 2005	CD	Freestyle Dust; Virgin	
United Kingdom	17 January 2005	12-inch vinyl; CD	Freestyle Dust; Virgin	
United States	24 January 2005	Alternative radio	Virgin; Astralwerks	
Japan	26 January 2005	CD	Freestyle Dust; Virgin	
