= Maurice Le Roux =

French composer and conductor (1923–1992)

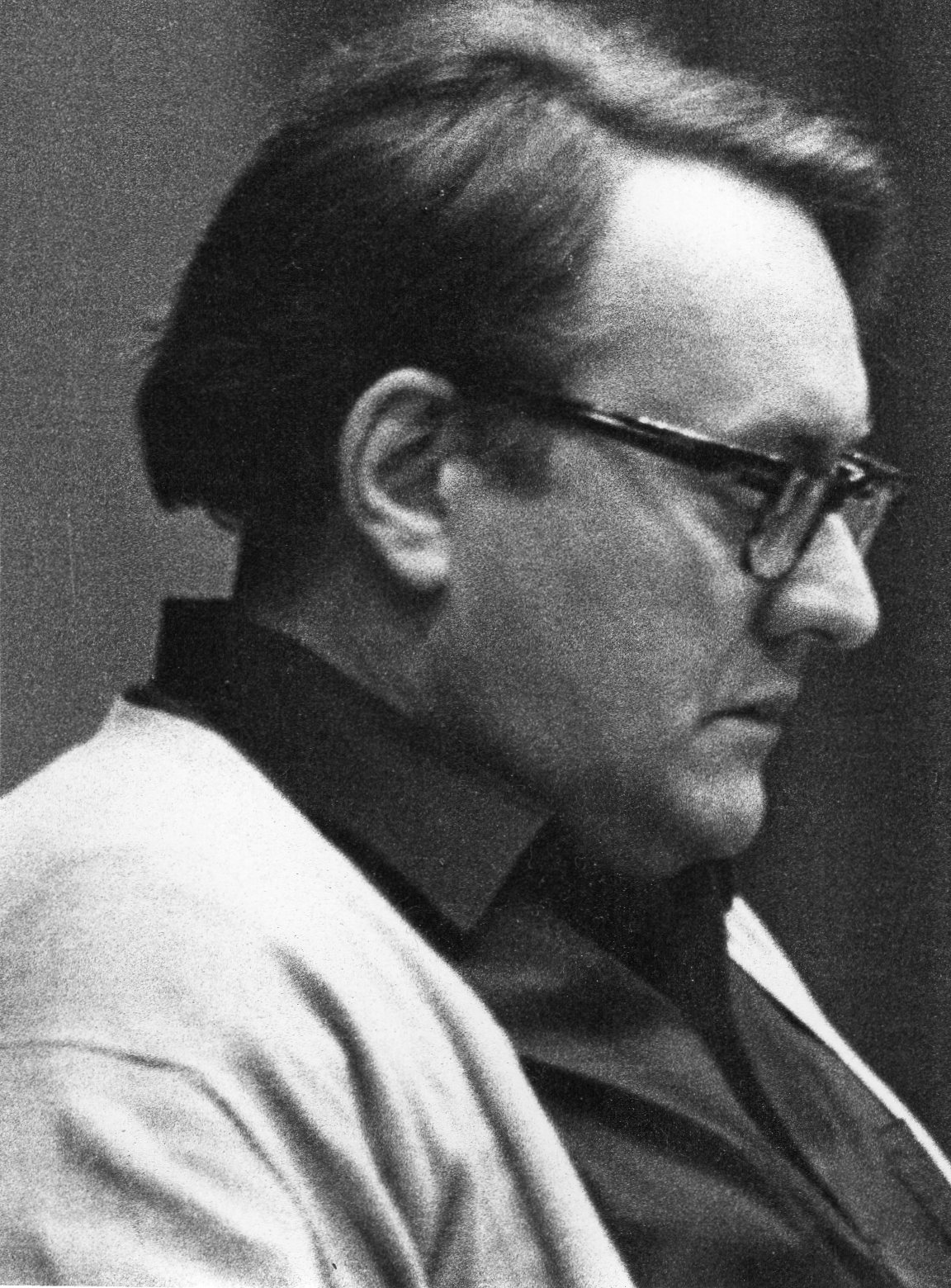
Maurice Le Roux

Maurice Anne Fernand Le Roux or Leroux (6 February 1923, Paris, France – 19 October 1992 in Avignon, France) was a French composer and conductor. He studied composition at the Paris Conservatory and was a student of Olivier Messiaen. His work includes 19 original film scores and a number of television scores and orchestrations.^{1}

== Filmography ==
As Composer

- 1952 : Crin-Blanc
- 1955 : Bad Liaisons (Les Mauvaises rencontres)
- 1956 : Les Possédées
- 1956 : Le Ballon rouge
- 1956 : The Wages of Sin
- 1957 : Amère victoire (English title: Bitter Victory)
- 1958 : Le Piège
- 1958 : That Night
- 1958 : Les Mistons
- 1958 : Broadway by Light
- 1960 : Présentation ou Charlotte et son steak
- 1961 : Vu du pont
- 1961 : Les Mauvais coups
- 1963 : Le petit soldat
- 1966 : Martin Soldat
- 1967 : La Bien-aimée (TV)
- 1968 : La Chamade
- 1969 : Baltagul
- 1973 : Kamouraska
- 1973 : Immoral Tales
- 1979 : Les Jardins secrets (TV)
- 1981 : Un étrange voyage
- 1982 : La Guérilléra

As Orchestrator

- 1955 : Cap-aux-sorciers (TV series)
- 1957 : Le Survenant (TV series)

== Citations ==
- ^{1}IMDB.
- ^{2}New Grove Dictionary of Music and Musicians.
