= National Board of Review Awards 1957 =

Annual US film awards ceremony

29th National Board of Review Awards

Late December, 1957

The 29th National Board of Review Awards were announced in late December 1957.

== Top Ten Films ==
1. The Bridge on the River Kwai
2. 12 Angry Men
3. The Spirit of St. Louis
4. The Rising of the Moon
5. Albert Schweitzer
6. Funny Face
7. The Bachelor Party
8. The Enemy Below
9. A Hatful of Rain
10. A Farewell to Arms

== Top Foreign Films ==
1. Ordet
2. Gervaise
3. Torero!
4. The Red Balloon
5. A Man Escaped

== Winners ==
- Best Film: The Bridge on the River Kwai
- Best Foreign Film: Ordet
- Best Actor: Alec Guinness (The Bridge on the River Kwai)
- Best Actress: Joanne Woodward (The Three Faces of Eve, No Down Payment)
- Best Supporting Actor: Sessue Hayakawa (The Bridge on the River Kwai)
- Best Supporting Actress: Sybil Thorndike (The Prince and the Showgirl)
- Best Director: David Lean (The Bridge on the River Kwai)
- Special Citation: Funny Face (for photographic innovations)
