= White Mane =

- Promotional poster
- Directed by: Albert Lamorisse
- Written by: Screenplay: Albert Lamorisse; Commentary: James Agee; Albert Lamorisse; Saul J. Turell; Story:: Denys Colomb de Daunant
- Based on: Crin-Blanc; 1959 story by René Guillot
- Produced by: Albert Lamorisse
- Starring: Alain Emery
- Narrated by: Frank Silvera; Les Marshak
- Cinematography: Edmond Séchan
- Edited by: Georges Alépée
- Music by: Maurice Leroux
- Distributed by: Films Montsouris; Janus Films
- Release date: March 1953
- Running time: 47 minutes (France); 31 minutes (USA)
- Country: France
- Language: French

White Mane (French: Crin-Blanc and Crin Blanc, Cheval Sauvage) is a 1953 short film directed by French filmmaker Albert Lamorisse. It is based on a children's book with the same name by the French author René Guillot.

The forty-seven-minute short, filmed on location in the marshes of Camargue, France, won numerous awards on its release, including the Short Film Palme d'Or Grand Prize at the Cannes Film Festival. The film also became popular with children and was marketed for them. The story tells a fable of how a young boy tames a wild white stallion called White Mane.

== Plot ==
In the marshes of Camargue, France, a herd of wild horses roam free. Their leader is a handsome white-haired stallion named White Mane (Crin Blanc in French).

A group of ranchers capture the wild stallion and place him in a corral. Yet White Mane escapes. A boy named Folco (Alain Emery), who lives with his fisherman grandfather, watches intently as White Mane escapes, and he dreams of one day handling White Mane. The ranchers once again try to capture White Mane and fail. Folco asks the men if he can have the white horse. Yes, says one of the men, "but first you have to catch him, but your fish will grow wings before you can manage that."

Later Folco comes across White Mane in the marshes, and he tries to rope him. However, White Mane gallops and drags Folco in the water for quite a while. Folco refuses to let go of the rope and almost passes out. White Mane relents and the two become friends.

White Mane returns to his herd and another horse challenges him for dominance. White Mane loses the fight and returns to join the boy.

The ranchers return and try to spook White Mane by setting fire to the area he and his herd live in. Folco jumps on White Mane (for the first time) and rides him bareback across the marshes of Camargue, over the sparse dunes to the sea. The ranchers give chase and surround them, but they refuse to be caught. With Folco on his back, White Mane rides into the sea. The film ends as the narrator states that White Mane took Folco "to a wonderful place where men and horses live as friends, always."

== Cast ==
- Alain Emery as Folco, the boy
- Pierre Bestieux
- Denys Colomb de Daunant
- Alain Colomb Daunant
- Charles Fouhetty
- Jean-Pierre Grenie as Narrator (French language)
- Charles Guillaume
- Pascal Lamorisse
- Pierre Moureaux-Nery
- Francois Perie
- Laurent Roche
- Frank Silvera as Narrator (English language)
- Les Marshak as Narrator (English language)

== Background ==
=== The horse ===
The story is based on real horses that are found in the Camargue region in southeast France. For centuries, possibly thousands of years, these small horses have lived wild in the harsh environment of the wetlands of the Rhône delta, the Camargue marshes, developing the stamina, hardiness and agility for which they are known today. They are the traditional mount of the gardians – Camargue "cowboys."

Camargue horses galloping through water, as does Crin Blanc in the film, are a popular and romantic image of the region.

=== Filming locations ===
The film was shot entirely on location in the southeast region of France; specifically the Petite Camargue (little Camargue), Bouches-du-Rhône, France, a marsh area located south of Arles, between the Mediterranean Sea and the two branches of the Rhône river delta.

== Critical reception ==
The film, since its first release in 1953, has generally received favorable reviews from critics. When the picture was rereleased in late 2007 by Janus Films, Terrence Rafferty, in The New York Times, said the short "is among the world's most famous and most honored films for children... But kids' stuff [it is] not... The tone of [the] film is that of open mouthed wonder." In White Mane, Rafferty wrote, "you sense, as in few other films, the real terrors of nature... And Lamorisse, [the] movie show[s], really was a remarkable artist: one of the cinema's best poets and a fearless explorer of the scary and exhilarating outbacks of the imagination."

Philip Kennicott in The Washington Post liked the mise en scène, writing "there are perfectly worthy reasons to keep [the film] in circulation. Visually, [it is] masterful." However, Kennicott argues that the film takes place in a world of lies. He wrote, "A boy and his horse are hunted down by adult ranchers — while a narrator makes vague promises of a better world to come. The beautiful imagery of [the film] is deployed in support of a moral system — a blunt promise of rewards for good behavior — not much more sophisticated than that of Santa and the Easter Bunny. Ah, the time-honored tradition of adults indoctrinating kids in a world-view that will lead only to bitter disappointment, unless the kids refuse to grow up."

== Distribution ==
On 19 March 1967, it was paired with the 1959 American short The Boy Who Owned a Melephant as an episode of the television anthology series CBS Children's Film Festival.

In late 2007, the film, along with the same director's later featurette The Red Balloon (1956), was restored and rereleased by Janus Films. The film was remastered by Janus Films in 35mm format.

A four-minute clip of the film is on the rotating list of programming on the cable television network Classic Arts Showcase.

=== Video and DVD ===
A version of the film was released in the United States on 30 June 1993 by Columbia TriStar Home Video, under the label "Children's Treasures Present."

Homevision released the film in video, combined with Albert Lamorisse's fantasy short The Red Balloon on 13 June 2000.

The Criterion Collection released a laserdisc of the film in 1986, produced by Criterion, Janus Films, and Voyager Press. Included in the disc was Lamorisse's The Red Balloon. Criterion released a DVD of the film in 2008.

== Awards ==
Wins

- Cannes Film Festival: Palme d'Or, Best Short Film, Albert Lamorisse; 1953.
- Prix Jean Vigo: Prix Jean Vigo, Short Film, Albert Lamorisse; 1953.

Nominations

- British Academy of Film and Television Arts: BAFTA Film Award, Best Documentary Film, France; 1954.

== See also ==
- List of films about horses

== See also ==
- Drapé (legend)
