= Albert Lamorisse =

French filmmaker, film producer, and writer (1922–1970)

- Born: 13 January 1922; Paris, France
- Died: 2 June 1970 (aged 48); Karaj, Iran
- Resting place: France
- Occupations: Writer, screenwriter, director, producer, game designer
- Years active: 1947–1970
- Spouse: Claude Jeanne Duparc Lamorisse

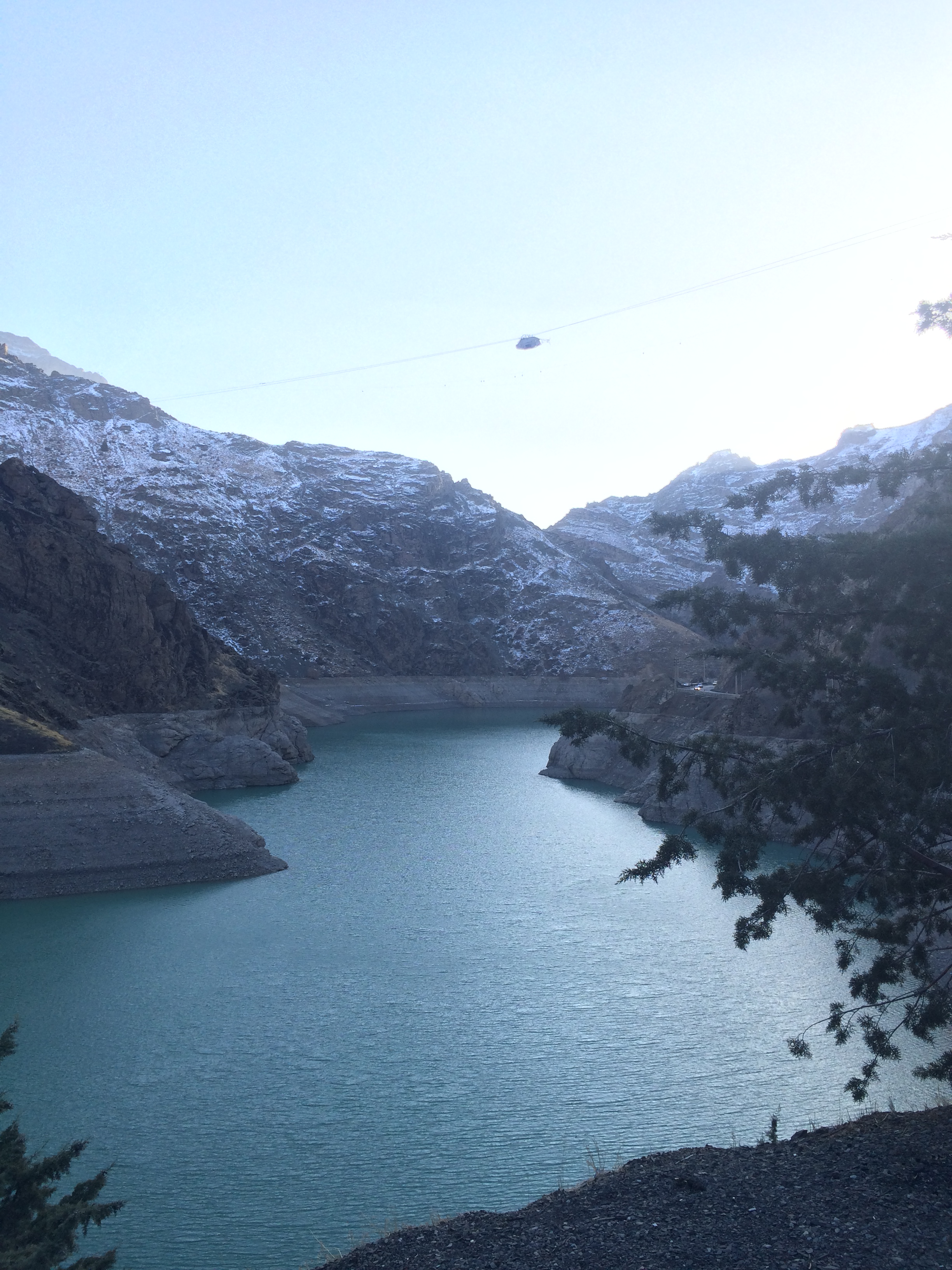
Lamorisse Helicopter memorial, in Karaj Dam, winter 2018

Albert Lamorisse (French: [lamɔʁis]; 13 January 1922 – 2 June 1970) was a French filmmaker, film producer, and writer of short films which he began making in the late 1940s.

Lamorisse's best known work is the short film The Red Balloon (1956), which earned him the Palme d'Or Grand Prize at the Cannes Film Festival, and an Oscar for writing the Best Original Screenplay in 1956.

He also invented the strategic board game Risk in 1957, that became one of the most popular board games in history.

== Life ==
Lamorisse was born in Paris, France. He first came into prominence – just after Bim (1950) – for directing and producing White Mane (1953). This is a short film that tells a fable of how a young boy befriends an untamable wild white stallion in the marshes of Camargue (the Petite Camargue) in Southern France.

=== The Red Balloon ===
Lamorisse's best known work is the short film The Red Balloon (1956), which earned him the Palme d'Or Grand Prize at the Cannes Film Festival, and an Oscar for writing the Best Original Screenplay in 1956.

=== Films, documentaries and Risk ===
Lamorisse also wrote, directed and produced the films Stowaway in the Sky (1960) and Circus Angel, as well as the documentaries Versailles and Paris Jamais Vu. In addition to films, he created the popular strategy board game Risk in 1957, originally with the title La Conquête du Monde (The Conquest of the World). In the mid-1960s Lamorisse shot parts of The Prospect of Iceland, a documentary about Iceland, which was made by Henry Sandoz and commissioned by NATO.

=== Helicopter crash in Iran and Oscar nomination ===
Lamorisse died in a helicopter crash while filming the documentary Le Vent des amoureux (The Lovers' Wind), during a helicopter tour of Iran in 1970. His son and widow completed the film, based on his production notes, and released it eight years later. It was nominated for a posthumous Oscar for best documentary. The title The Lovers' Wind is translated into Bad-e Saba in Persian. A saba wind is a gentle wind that blows from the northeast, symbolizing the whispers of lovers.

Albert and Claude Lamorisse had three children named Pascal, Sabine, and Fanny. Pascal and Sabine were featured in The Red Balloon.

== Filmography ==
Short films

- Bim (1950) ... a.k.a. Bim, le petit âne (France)
- Crin-Blanc (1953) ... a.k.a. White Mane (U.S.) and Wild Stallion
- Le Ballon rouge (1956) ... a.k.a. The Red Balloon

Feature films

- Le Voyage en ballon (1960); ... a.k.a. Stowaway in the Sky
- Fifi la plume (1965) ... a.k.a. Circus Angel (US: TV title)

Documentaries

- Djerba (1947)
- Versailles (1967)
- Paris jamais vu (1967)
- Le Vent des amoureux (1978) ... a.k.a. The Lovers' Wind

== Awards ==
Wins

- Cannes Film Festival: Palme d'Or, White Mane, Best Short Film, Albert Lamorisse; 1953.
- Prix Jean Vigo: Prix Jean Vigo, White Mane, Short Film, Albert Lamorisse; 1953.
- Prix Louis Delluc: Prix Louis Delluc; The Red Balloon, Albert Lamorisse; 1956.
- Cannes Film Festival: Palme d'Or du court métrage/Golden Palm; The Red Balloon, Best Short Film, Albert Lamorisse; 1956.
- Academy Awards: Oscar; The Red Balloon, Best Writing, Best Original Screenplay, Albert Lamorisse; 1957.
- British Academy of Film and Television Arts: BAFTA Award; The Red Balloon, Special Award, France; 1957.
- Venice Film Festival: OCIC Award; Le Voyage en ballon; 1960.
- Cannes Film Festival: Technical Grand Prize; Fifi la plume, 1965.
- Cannes Film Festival: Technical Grand Prize – Special Mention; Versailles; 1967.
- National Board of Review: Top Foreign Films; The Red Balloon,1957.

Nominations

- British Academy of Film and Television Arts: BAFTA Film Award, White Mane, Best Documentary Film, France; 1954.
- Venice Film Festival: Golden Lion; Le Voyage en ballon; 1960.
- Cannes Film Festival: Golden Palm; Fifi la plume; 1965.
- Cannes Film Festival: Golden Palm; Best Short Film, Versailles; 1967.
- Academy Awards: Oscar; Best Documentary, Features, Le Vent des amoureux; 1979.
