= Beguiled =

Beguiled or The Beguiled can refer to:

- To be subject to deception
- To be subject to charisma
- The Beguiled (novel), a 1966 novel about the American civil war by Thomas P. Cullinan
  - The Beguiled (1971 film), adaptation by Don Siegel
  - The Beguiled (2017 film), adaptation by Sofia Coppola
- "Beguiled", a 2022 song by The Smashing Pumpkins
