= List of awards and nominations received by James Gandolfini =

American actor

James Gandolfini awards and nominations
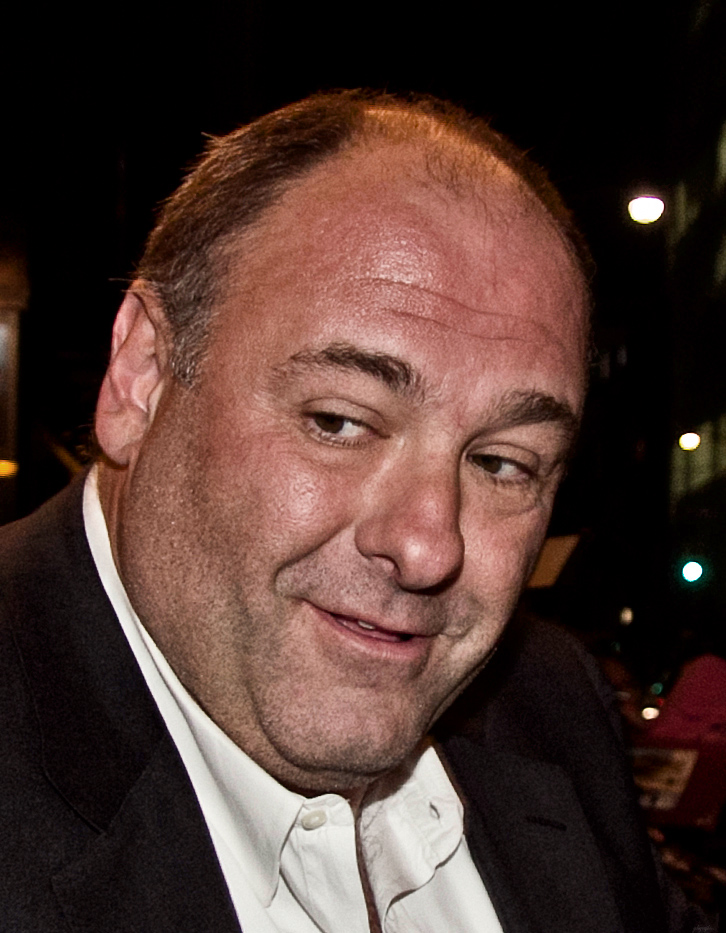
- Gandolfini at the 2011 Toronto International Film Festival
Awards and nominations
Award	Wins	Nominations
AARP Awards	1	1
AFI Awards	1	1
Festival International de Programmes Audiovisuels	1	1
Boston Society of Film Critics Awards	1	1
Critics' Choice Movie Awards	0	3
Chicago Film Critics Awards	0	1
Independent Spirit Awards	0	1
Golden Globe Awards	1	4
Gotham Awards	1	1
Houston Film Critics Society Awards	0	1
IndieWire Critics Poll	0	1
Outfest Outie Awards	1	1
London Film Critics' Circle Awards	0	1
Primetime Emmy Awards	3	8
Prism Awards	1	1
San Diego Film Critics Society Awards	0	1
Satellite Awards	0	2
Screen Actors Guild Awards	5	16
TCA Awards	3	6
Tony Awards	0	1
Viewers for Quality Television Q Awards	0	1
Village Voice Film Poll	0	2
Women Film Critics Circle Awards	0	1

Totals (Note: Certain award groups do not simply award one winner. They acknowledge several different recipients, have runners-up, and have third place. Since this is a specific recognition and is different from losing an award, runner-up mentions are considered wins in this award tally. For simplification and to avoid errors, each award in this list has been presumed to have had a prior nomination.)
- Wins: 19
- Nominations: 57

James Gandolfini (1961–2013) was an American actor who has received multiple awards and nominations for his television and film work. Gandolfini started acting in small budget films throughout the 1980s and early 1990s. In 1995, he played Bear, a stuntman and gangster, in the crime thriller-comedy film Get Shorty. Gandolfini, along with the rest of the cast, received a Screen Actors Guild Award for Outstanding Performance by a Cast in a Motion Picture nomination, at the 2nd Screen Actors Guild Awards. In 1997, Gandolfini was cast as Tony Soprano, a crime boss and family man, in the HBO crime drama series The Sopranos (1999-2007). Gandolfini received critical acclaim for the role, receiving three Emmy Awards, three Screen Actors Guild Awards, and a Golden Globe Award. Many television critics have named Gandolfini's performance as Soprano as one of the greatest and most influential in television history. While on The Sopranos, Gandolfini continued to appear in films. In 2001, he played gay hitman Winston Baldry in the adventure comedy film The Mexican. He won the Best Performance by an Actor in a Supporting Role award at that year's Outfest Awards. Gandolfini also appeared in Broadway shows. In 2009, for his role as Michael in God of Carnage, he was nominated for the Best Actor in a Play at the 63rd Tony Awards.

Gandolfini died in 2013 while on a vacation in Italy. Romantic comedy-drama film Enough Said (2013) and crime film The Drop (2014) were released after his death. He received positive reviews for his role in the former, receiving multiple film critics awards and nominations. In addition to acting, he co-produced multiple documentaries with HBO. He received a Primetime Emmy Award for Outstanding Limited Series nomination for the 2012 biopic Hemingway & Gellhorn. The 2016 crime drama miniseries The Night Of, in which Gandolfini was a co-executive producer, received multiple awards and nominations for directing, producing, and technical achievements.

== Major associations ==
=== Emmy Awards ===
Primetime Emmy Awards
Year	Category	Nominated work	Result	Ref.
1999	Outstanding Lead Actor in a Drama Series	The Sopranos (episode: "The Sopranos")	Nominated	
2000	Outstanding Lead Actor in a Drama Series	The Sopranos (episode: "The Happy Wanderer")	Won	
2001	Outstanding Lead Actor in a Drama Series	The Sopranos (episode: "Amour Fou")	Won	
2003	Outstanding Lead Actor in a Drama Series	The Sopranos (episode: "Whitecaps")	Won	
2004	Outstanding Lead Actor in a Drama Series	The Sopranos (episode: "Where's Johnny?")	Nominated	
2007	Outstanding Lead Actor in a Drama Series	The Sopranos (episode: "The Second Coming")	Nominated	
2008	Outstanding Documentary or Nonfiction Special	Alive Day Memories: Home from Iraq	Nominated	
2012	Outstanding Limited Series	Hemingway & Gellhorn	Nominated	

=== Golden Globe Awards ===
Year	Category	Nominated work	Result	Ref.
2000	Best Actor – Television Series Drama	The Sopranos (season 1)	Won	
2001	Best Actor – Television Series Drama	The Sopranos (season 2)	Nominated	
2002	Best Actor – Television Series Drama	The Sopranos (season 3)	Nominated	
2003	Best Actor – Television Series Drama	The Sopranos (season 4)	Nominated	

=== Screen Actors Guild Awards ===
Year	Category	Nominated work	Result	Ref.
1996	Outstanding Cast in a Motion Picture	Get Shorty	Nominated (Note: Nomination shared with other cast members)	
2000	Outstanding Male Actor in a Drama Series	The Sopranos (season 1)	Won	
2000	Outstanding Ensemble in a Drama Series	The Sopranos (season 1)	Won (Note: Award shared with other main cast members)	
2001	Outstanding Male Actor in a Drama Series	The Sopranos (season 2)	Nominated	
2001	Outstanding Ensemble in a Drama Series	The Sopranos (season 2)	Nominated (Note: Nomination shared with other main cast members)	
2002	Outstanding Male Actor in a Drama Series	The Sopranos (season 3)	Nominated	
2002	Outstanding Ensemble in a Drama Series	The Sopranos (season 3)	Nominated	
2003	Outstanding Male Actor in a Drama Series	The Sopranos (season 4)	Won	
2003	Outstanding Ensemble in a Drama Series	The Sopranos (season 4)	Nominated	
2005	Outstanding Male Actor in a Drama Series	The Sopranos (season 5)	Nominated	
2005	Outstanding Ensemble in a Drama Series	The Sopranos (season 5)	Nominated	
2007	Outstanding Male Actor in a Drama Series	The Sopranos (season 6 - Part 1)	Nominated	
2007	Outstanding Ensemble in a Drama Series	The Sopranos (season 6 - Part 1)	Nominated	
2008	Outstanding Male Actor in a Drama Series	The Sopranos (season 6 - Part 2)	Won	
2008	Outstanding Ensemble in a Drama Series	The Sopranos (season 6 - Part 2)	Won	
2014	Outstanding Male Actor in a Supporting Role	Enough Said	Nominated	

=== Tony Awards ===
Year	Category	Nominated work	Result	Ref.
2009	Best Actor in a Play	God of Carnage	Nominated	

== Miscellaneous awards ==
Awards and nominations received by James Gandolfini
Award	Year	Category	Work	Result	Ref(s)
AARP Awards	2014	Best Grownup Love Story	Enough Said	Won (Note: Award shared with Julia Louis-Dreyfus)	
AFI Awards	2002	Actor of the Year - Male - TV Series	The Sopranos	Won	
Festival International de Programmes Audiovisuels	2000	TV Series and Serials: Actor	The Sopranos	Won	
Boston Society of Film Critics Awards	2013	Best Supporting Actor	Enough Said	Won	
Critics' Choice Movie Awards	2014	Best Supporting Actor	Enough Said	Nominated	
Critics' Choice Movie Awards	2014	Best Actor in a Comedy	Enough Said	Nominated	
Chicago Film Critics Awards	2013	Best Supporting Actor	Enough Said	Nominated	
Independent Spirit Awards	2014	Best Supporting Male	Enough Said	Nominated	
Gotham Awards	2013	Tribute Award		Won	
Houston Film Critics Society Awards	2013	Best Supporting Actor	Enough Said	Nominated	
IndieWire Critics Poll	2013	Best Supporting Actor	Enough Said	Nominated	
Outfest Outie Awards	2002	Best Performance by an Actor in a Supporting Role	The Mexican	Won	
London Film Critics' Circle Awards	2014	Supporting Actor of the Year	Enough Said	Nominated	
Prism Awards	2011	Documentary Program - Mental Health	Wartorn: 1861–2010	Won	
San Diego Film Critics Society Awards	2013	Best Supporting Actor	Enough Said	Nominated	
Satellite Awards	2000	Best Actor – Television Series Drama	The Sopranos	Nominated	
Satellite Awards	2001	Best Actor – Television Series Drama	The Sopranos	Nominated	
TCA Awards	1999	Individual Achievement in Drama	The Sopranos	Won (Note: Award shared with David E. Kelley for The Practice)	
TCA Awards	2000	Individual Achievement in Drama	The Sopranos	Won	
TCA Awards	2001	Individual Achievement in Drama	The Sopranos	Won	
TCA Awards	2003	Individual Achievement in Drama	The Sopranos	Nominated	
TCA Awards	2004	Individual Achievement in Drama	The Sopranos	Nominated	
TCA Awards	2006	Individual Achievement in Drama	The Sopranos	Nominated	
Viewers for Quality Television Q Awards	1999	Best Actor in a Quality Drama Series	The Sopranos	Nominated	
Village Voice Film Poll	2012	Best Supporting Actor	Killing Them Softly	8th Place	
Village Voice Film Poll	2013	Best Supporting Actor	Enough Said	3rd Place	
Women Film Critics Circle Awards	2013	Best Actor	Enough Said	Nominated	
