= List of awards and nominations received by Sofia Coppola =

Awards bestowed on Sofia Coppola

Sofia Coppola awards and nominations
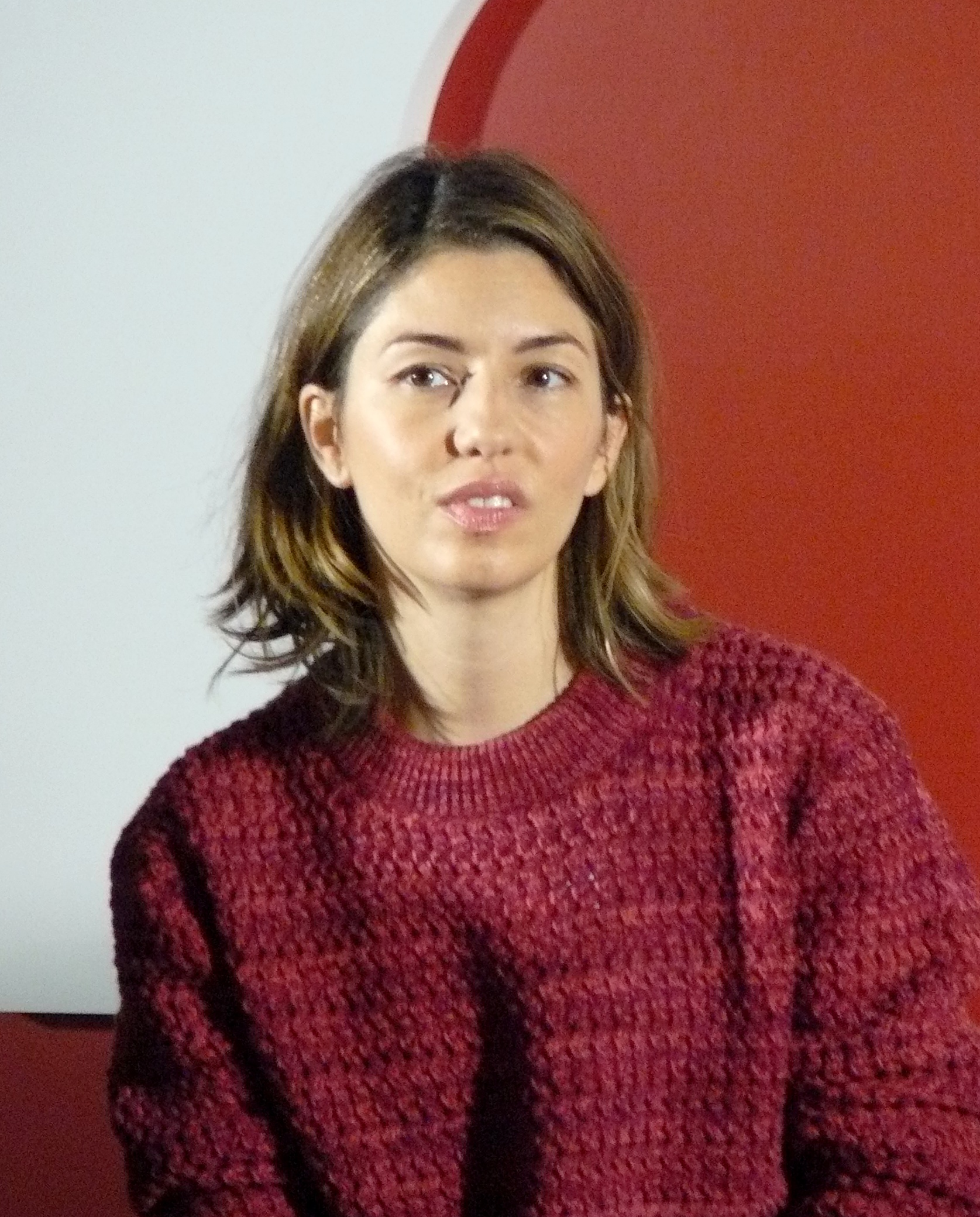
- Coppola in 2010
Award	Wins	Nominations
Academy Awards	1	3
British Academy Film Awards	0	3
Golden Globe Awards	2	3
Independent Spirit Awards	3	3
Primetime Emmy Awards	0	1

Sofia Coppola is an American filmmaker and actress. She is best known for directing, producing, and writing such films as the psychological drama The Virgin Suicides (1999), the comedy drama Lost in Translation (2003), the period drama Marie Antoinette (2006), the coming-of-age drama Somewhere (2010), the crime drama The Bling Ring (2013), the period thriller The Beguiled (2017), the comedy On the Rocks (2020), and the biographical drama Priscilla (2023). She also wrote, produced, and directed the Netflix Christmas musical comedy special A Very Murray Christmas (2015).

Throughout her career, Coppola earned nominations for three Academy Awards, winning one, and three Golden Globe Awards, winning two. She was also nominated for three British Academy Film Awards and a Primetime Emmy Award. In 2004, Coppola became the third woman, the first American woman, and the youngest woman to be nominated for the Academy Award for Best Director. In 2010, she was the first American woman and the fourth American filmmaker to win the Golden Lion, the top prize at the Venice Film Festival. In 2017, she became the second woman and the first American woman to receive Best Director at the Cannes Film Festival.

== Major associations ==
=== Academy Awards ===
Year	Category	Nominated work	Result	Ref.
2004	Best Picture	Lost in Translation	Nominated	
2004	Best Director	Lost in Translation	Nominated	
2004	Best Original Screenplay	Lost in Translation	Won	

Directed Academy Award-nominated performances
Under Coppola's direction, these actors have received Academy Award nominations for their performances in their respective roles.

Year	Performer	Film	Result
Best Actor
2003	Bill Murray	Lost in Translation	Nominated

=== British Academy Film Awards ===
Year	Category	Nominated work	Result	Ref.
2004	Best Film	Lost in Translation	Nominated	
2004	Best Director	Lost in Translation	Nominated	
2004	Best Original Screenplay	Lost in Translation	Nominated	

Directed BAFTA Award-nominated performances
Under Coppola's direction, these actors have received BAFTA Award nominations for their performances in their respective roles.

Year	Performer	Film	Result
Best Actor
2003	Bill Murray	Lost in Translation	Won
Best Actress
2003	Scarlett Johansson	Lost in Translation	Won

=== Golden Globe Awards ===
Year	Category	Nominated work	Result	Ref.
2004	Best Motion Picture – Musical or Comedy	Lost in Translation	Won	
2004	Best Director	Lost in Translation	Nominated	
2004	Best Screenplay	Lost in Translation	Won	

Year	Category	Nominated work	Result
2008	Best Director	Sweeney Todd: The Demon Barber of Fleet Street	Nominated

Directed Golden Globe Award-nominated performances
Under Coppola's direction, these actors have received Golden Globe Award nominations for their performances in their respective roles.

Year	Performer	Film	Result
Best Actor in a Motion Picture – Musical or Comedy
2003	Bill Murray	Lost in Translation	Won
Best Actress in a Motion Picture – Drama
2003	Cailee Spaeny	Priscilla	Nominated
Best Actress in a Motion Picture – Musical or Comedy
2003	Scarlett Johansson	Lost in Translation	Nominated
Best Supporting Actor
1994	Bill Murray	On the Rocks	Nominated

=== Independent Spirit Awards ===
Year	Category	Nominated work	Result	Ref.
2004	Best Film	Lost in Translation	Won	
2004	Best Director	Lost in Translation	Won	
2004	Best Screenplay	Lost in Translation	Won	

=== Primetime Emmy Awards ===
Year	Category	Nominated work	Result	Ref.
2016	Outstanding Television Movie	A Very Murray Christmas	Nominated	

=== Golden Raspberry ===
Year	Category	Nominated work	Result	Ref.
11th Golden Raspberry Awards	Worst Supporting Actress	The Godfather Part III	Won	
11th Golden Raspberry Awards	Worst New Star	The Godfather Part III	Won	
20th Golden Raspberry Awards	Worst Supporting Actress	Star Wars Episode I: The Phantom Menace	Nominated	
20th Golden Raspberry Awards	Worst New Star of the Decade	The Godfather Part III & Star Wars Episode I: The Phantom Menace	Nominated	

== Festival awards ==
=== Cannes Film Festival ===
Year	Category	Nominated work	Result	Ref.
1999	Caméra d'Or	The Virgin Suicides	Nominated	
1999	C.I.C.A.E. Award	The Virgin Suicides	Nominated	
2006	Palme d'Or	Marie Antoinette	Nominated	
2006	Cinema Prize	Marie Antoinette	Won	
2013	Un Certain Regard	The Bling Ring	Nominated	
2017	Palme d'Or	The Beguiled	Nominated	
2017	Best Director	The Beguiled	Won	

=== Venice Film Festival ===
Year	Category	Nominated work	Result	Ref.
2003	Lina Mangiacapre Award	Lost in Translation	Won	
2010	Golden Lion	Somewhere	Won	
2023	Golden Lion	Priscilla	Nominated	

== Guild awards ==
=== Directors Guild of America Awards ===
Year	Category	Nominated work	Result	Ref.
2003	Outstanding Directing – Feature Film	Lost in Translation	Nominated	
2015	Outstanding Directing – Variety Specials	A Very Murray Christmas	Nominated	

=== Producers Guild of America Awards ===
Year	Category	Nominated work	Result	Ref.
2015	Best Long-Form Television	A Very Murray Christmas	Nominated	

=== Writers Guild of America Awards ===
Year	Category	Nominated work	Result	Ref.
2003	Best Original Screenplay	Lost in Translation	Won	

== Critics awards ==
Year	Award	Category	Work	Result
2000	Las Vegas Film Critics Society	Best Director	The Virgin Suicides	Nominated
2000	Las Vegas Film Critics Society	Best Screenplay	The Virgin Suicides	Nominated
2000	Las Vegas Film Critics Society	Best Female Newcomer	The Virgin Suicides	Nominated
2000	MTV Movie & TV Awards	Best New Filmmaker	The Virgin Suicides	Won
2003	National Board of Review	Special Achievement Award	Lost in Translation	Won
2003	National Society of Film Critics	Best Director	Lost in Translation	Nominated
2003	New York Film Critics Circle	Best Director	Lost in Translation	Won
2003	New York Film Critics Circle	Best Screenplay	Lost in Translation	Nominated
2003	Toronto Film Critics Association	Best Screenplay	Lost in Translation	Won
2006	Gotham Awards	Best Feature	Marie Antionette	Nominated
2010	National Board of Review	Special Achievement	Somewhere	Won
2017	Gotham Awards	Special Tribute	—N/a	Won
2017	Munich Film Festival	Best International Film	The Beguiled	Nominated
2017	San Diego Film Critics Society	Best Adapted Screenplay	The Beguiled	Nominated
2017	Sydney Film Festival	Best Film	The Beguiled	Nominated
