= Cindy (film) =

- Genre: Musical
- Written by: James L. Brooks; Stan Daniels; David Davis; Ed. Weinberger
- Directed by: William A. Graham
- Starring: Charlayne Woodard; Mae Mercer; Nell Carter; Alaina Reed Hall; Scoey Mitchell; Clifton Davis
- Music by: Stan Daniels
- Country of origin: United States
- Original language: English

Production
- Producers: James L. Brooks; Stan Daniels; David Davis; Ed. Weinberger
- Cinematography: Larry Boelens
- Editors: Vince Humphrey; Kenneth R. Koch
- Running time: 98 minutes
- Production companies: John-Charles-Walters Productions; Paramount Television

Original release
- Network: ABC
- Release: March 24, 1978

Cindy is a 1978 American musical television movie, shot on videotape and first broadcast on the ABC television network, with an entirely African-American cast. Directed by William A. Graham, the film is an urbanized retelling of Cinderella.

== Plot ==
After World War II, Cindy has moved from the south to live in Harlem with her newly blended family. She finds herself constantly abused by her stepmother and stepsisters. Her father provides some comfort but cannot prevent the abuse entirely. One night, she meets Captain Joe Prince and is swept off her feet. A romance soon ensues.

== Cast ==
- Charlayne Woodard as Cindy
- Cleavant Derricks as Michael Simpson
- Mae Mercer as Sara Hayes
- Nell Carter as Olive
- Alaina Reed Hall as Venus
- Scoey Mitchell as Cindy's Father
- Clifton Davis as Captain Joe Prince
- W. Benson Terry as Miles Archer

== Musical numbers ==
All songs are composed by Stan Daniels, unless otherwise noted.

- "Jesus, Lover of My Soul" (Charles Wesley)—Cindy and Cast
- "Sugar Hill Ball"—Olive, Venus, and Cindy
- "Your Feet's Too Big" (Fred Fisher, Ada Benson)—Fats Waller
- "Men's Room Attendant"—Cindy's Father and Male Chorus
- "When It Happens"—Joe, Cindy, Olive, Venus, and Sara
- "Love Is the Magic"—Cindy

== Awards and nominations ==
Year	Award	Category	Nominee	Result
1978	Primetime Emmy Award	Outstanding Achievement in Costume Design for Music-Variety	Sandra Stewart	Nominated
