= Philippe Le Sourd =

French cinematographer

Philippe Le Sourd is a French cinematographer.

== Filmography ==
=== Feature film ===
Year	Title	Director	Notes
1998	Cantique de la racaille	Vincent Ravalec	
1999	Peut-être	Cédric Klapisch	
2002	La merveilleuse odyssée de l'idiot Toboggan	Vincent Ravalec	With Jeanne Lapoirie
2004	Atomik Circus - Le retour de James Bataille	Didier Poiraud; Thierry Poiraud	
2006	A Good Year	Ridley Scott	
2008	Seven Pounds	Gabriele Muccino	
2013	The Grandmaster	Wong Kar-wai	Nominated- Academy Award for Best Cinematography
2017	La Traviata	Sofia Coppola; Francesca Nesler	
2017	The Beguiled	Sofia Coppola	
2020	On the Rocks	Sofia Coppola	
2023	Priscilla	Sofia Coppola	

=== Music video ===
Year	Title	Artist	Director
1997	"Love Won't Wait"	Gary Barlow	Rocky Schenck
1997	"So Help Me Girl"	Gary Barlow	Rocky Schenck
2011	"Papi"	Jennifer Lopez	Paul Hunter
2014	"Invisible"	U2	Mark Romanek
2014	"Living for Love"	Madonna	Julien Choquart; Camille Hirigoyen
2019	"Swan Song"	Dua Lipa	Floria Sigismondi
2023	"Stuck"	Thirty Seconds to Mars	Jared Leto
