= Mae Mercer =

American actress

- Born: June 12, 1932; Battleboro, North Carolina, U.S.
- Died: October 29, 2008 (aged 76); Northridge, California, U.S.
- Occupations: Actress; singer
- Years active: 1962–2004

Mae Mercer (June 12, 1932 – October 29, 2008) was an American blues singer and actress. She was born in the Temperance Hall community of Edgecombe County.

Mercer lived in North Carolina through age 15. She spent eight years in the 1960s singing in a blues bar in Paris, the Blues Club, owned by publisher Maurice Girodias and touring Europe. She eventually came to own and operate a blues club in the city.

Mercer returned to the United States in the early 1970s to begin a career as an actress in films and television. Films in which she appeared included Dirty Harry (1971), The Beguiled (1971), Frogs (1972), Cindy (1978), and Pretty Baby (1978). She was co-producer of the documentary film Angela Davis: Portrait of a Revolutionary (1972).

In 1996, the Mayor of Rocky Mount, NC, Fred Turnage, declared June 12 Mae Mercer Day. During this time, Mercer sought to produce her own biographical picture through her production company Black Owl Productions and was backed by local pastor Reverend James Bullock. Filming was slated to take place in Edgecombe County and other parts of North Carolina, New York, Paris and Southern California.

== Filmography ==
Year	Title	Role	Notes
1963	Two Are Guilty		
1967	The Hell with Heroes	Chanteuse	
1971	The Beguiled	Hallie	
1971	Dirty Harry	Mrs. Russell	
1972	Frogs	Maybelle	
1973	Kung Fu	Elizabeth	2 episodes
1974	The Swinging Cheerleaders	Jessica Thorpe	
1978	Cindy	Sara Hayes	
1978	Pretty Baby	Mama Mosebery	
1989	Homer and Eddie	Ellen	
