= The Beguiled (novel) =

1966 novel by Thomas P. Cullinan

- Author: Thomas P. Cullinan
- Language: English
- Genre: Fiction
- Publisher: Penguin Books
- Publication date: 1966
- Publication place: United States

The Beguiled is a 1966 novel written by Thomas P. Cullinan.

== Plot ==
A Union soldier recuperates at a girls school in Confederate Virginia during the American Civil War.

== Film adaptations ==
The novel was adapted into two films, in 1971 starring Clint Eastwood, Geraldine Page and Elizabeth Hartman, directed by Don Siegel and in 2017 starring Nicole Kidman and Colin Farrell, directed by Sofia Coppola.
