= Elektrobank =

1997 single by the Chemical Brothers

Single by the Chemical Brothers

from the album Dig Your Own Hole
- B-side: "Not Another Drugstore"; "Don't Stop the Rock" (Electronic Battle Weapon version)
- Released: 8 September 1997
- Studio: Orinoco (South London, England)
- Length: 8:18
- Label: Freestyle Dust; Virgin
- Songwriters: Tom Rowlands; Ed Simons
- Producer: The Chemical Brothers

The Chemical Brothers singles chronology
"Block Rockin' Beats" (1997)	"Elektrobank" (1997)	"The Private Psychedelic Reel" (1997)

Music video
- "Elektrobank" on YouTube

"Elektrobank" is a song by English electronic music duo the Chemical Brothers. It was released as a single from their second album, Dig Your Own Hole (1997), in September 1997. It peaked at number 17 on the UK Singles Chart. Spike Jonze directed the music video, which depicted a mixed artistic gymnastics / rhythmic gymnastics competition with his girlfriend at the time Sofia Coppola as one of the competitors. It has been called "arguably Jonze's greatest music video". The single does not appear on either of the duo's singles compilations, Singles 93–03 and Brotherhood.

== Samples ==
The vocals "Who is dis doin' this synthetic type of alpha beta psychedelic funkin'?" are taken from the song "This That Shit" by Keith Murray. The voice of the introduction is from DJ Kool Herc and was recorded live at the Irving Plaza in late 1996.

== Music Video ==
The music video, directed by Spike Jonze, opens with a girl named Janet, putting a bandage on, as she is up next to go on and perform. As she walks out of a room, another girl from the other team finishes off her performance. Janet then walks to her coach, known as Mr. Lazo. Janet takes off her jacket and pants, and the judges gave a score of the girl performing a 965. One of the judges then say "Next up, Janet from Saint Andrew's." She then gets ready, along with the girls on her team showing encouragement.

The song then kicks in, getting into the performance, with people watching and clapping in the background. The enemy team sledge on her quietly. Janet then does front flips and back flips, with the vocals saying "Who is dis doin' this synthetic type of alpha beta psychedelic funkin?". Despite the cast on her foot, Janet manages to do really good in the competition, with the close up of the judges. It all goes well until Janet lands on her foot, with the tempo slowing down. The crowd starts murmuring, as Janet is almost done. Janet's parents then come in, doesn't give up, and does her last bit of the performance, which is a backflip, landing successfully, as her performances finish. Her team mates come in, and the score for Janet shows 970. Janet cheers, while the other team is upset. A photo is then taken of Mr. Lizzo holding Janet, as she made her team win.

There is also an audio commentary from Spike Jonze, but it doesn't sound like his voice, because it's different to the audio commentary on Daft Punk's Da Funk music video.

The audio commentary can be found on the DVD Copy of The Chemical Brothers: Singles 93-03, which contains all of the music videos from 1993 to 2003, with interviews, behind the scenes, etc.

== Track listings ==
UK and European CD1
No.	Title	Length
1.	"Elektrobank" (full length)	8:01
2.	"Not Another Drugstore"	5:33
3.	"Don't Stop the Rock" (Electronic Battle Weapon version)	7:15

UK and European CD2, Australian CD single
No.	Title	Length
1.	"Elektrobank" (radio edit)	3:56
2.	"Elektrobank" (Dust Brothers remix)	3:55
3.	"These Beats Are Made for Breakin'"	2:48

UK 12-inch single
No.	Title	Length
1.	"Elektrobank" (full length)	8:00
2.	"Not Another Drugstore"	5:31
3.	"Elektrobank" (Dust Brothers remix)	3:53

US maxi-CD single
No.	Title	Length
1.	"Elektrobank" (full length)	8:01
2.	"Not Another Drugstore"	5:33
3.	"Elektrobank" (Dust Brothers remix)	3:55
4.	"Don't Stop the Rock" (Electronic Battle Weapon version)	7:15
5.	"These Beats Are Made for Breakin'"	2:48
6.	"Elektrobank" (edit)	3:56

US 12-inch single
No.	Title	Length
1.	"Elektrobank" (full length)	8:01
2.	"These Beats Are Made for Breakin'"	2:48
3.	"Elektrobank" (Dust Brothers remix)	3:55
4.	"Not Another Drugstore"	5:33

== Credits and personnel ==
Credits are lifted from the Dig Your Own Hole album booklet.

Studios

- Recorded at Orinoco Studios (South London, England)
- Mastered at The Exchange (London, England)

Personnel

- The Chemical Brothers – production
  - Tom Rowlands – writing
  - Ed Simons – writing
- Kool Herc – introduction voice, recorded live at Irving Plaza in late 1996
- Keith Murray – vocal sample
- Simon Phillips – drums
- Steve Dub – engineering
- Mike Marsh – mastering

== Charts ==
Chart (1997)	Peak position
Europe (Eurochart Hot 100)	38
Finland (Suomen virallinen lista)	16
New Zealand (Recorded Music NZ)	44
Scottish Singles Sales (Official Charts)	17
Spain (AFYVE)	9
UK Singles (Official Charts)	17
UK Dance (Official Charts)	7
US Dance Singles Sales (Billboard)	30

== Release history ==
Region	Date	Format(s)	Label(s)	Ref.
United States	11 August 1997	Alternative radio	Astralwerks	
United Kingdom	8 September 1997	12-inch vinyl; CD	Freestyle Dust; Virgin	
Japan	26 September 1997	CD	Freestyle Dust; Virgin	
