= Boston Society of Film Critics Awards 2013 =

Annual US film awards ceremony

34th BSFC Awards

December 8, 2013

Best Film:
12 Years a Slave

The 34th Boston Society of Film Critics Awards, honoring the best in filmmaking in 2013, were given on December 8, 2013.

== Winners ==
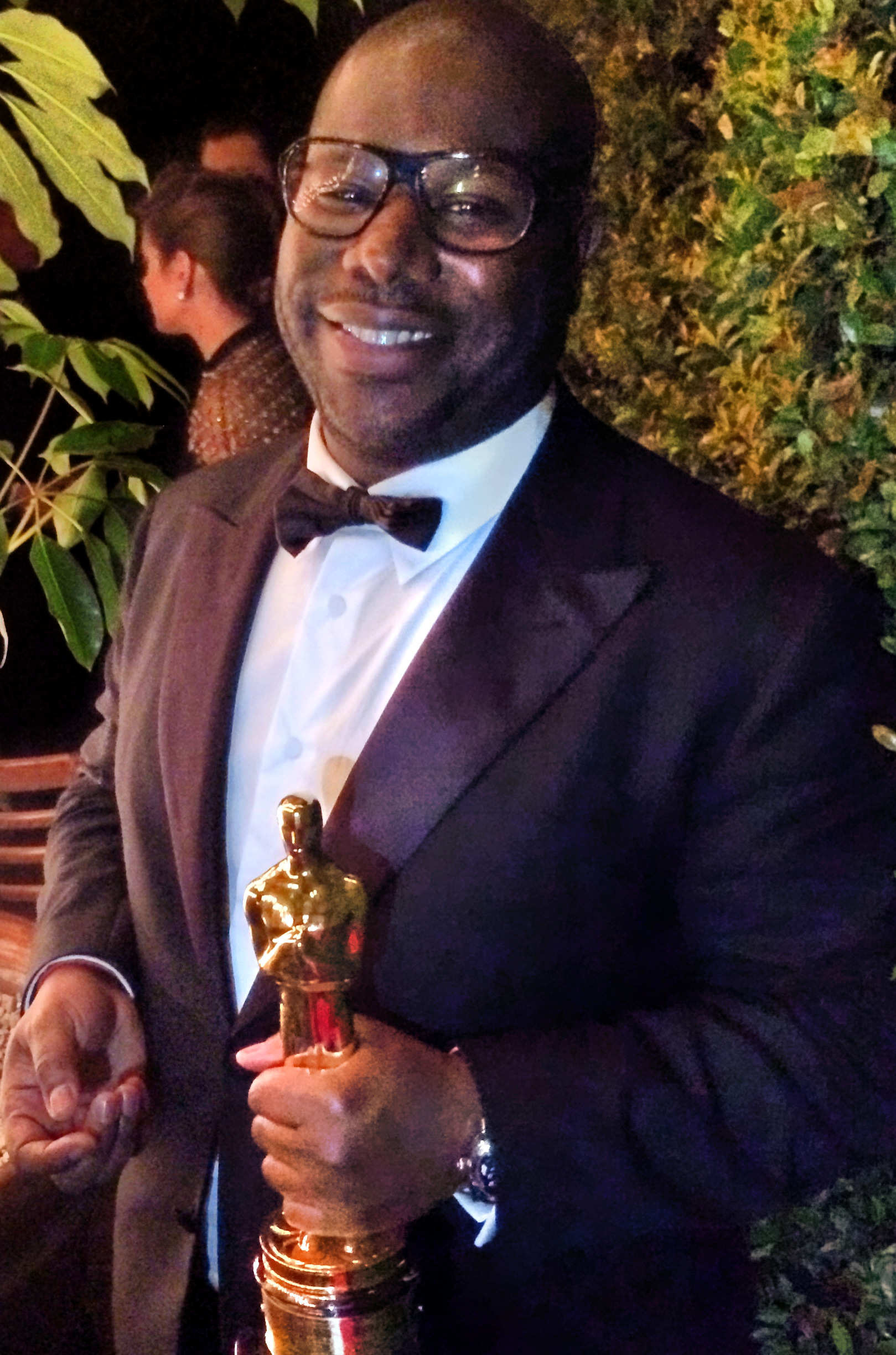
Steve McQueen, Best Director winner

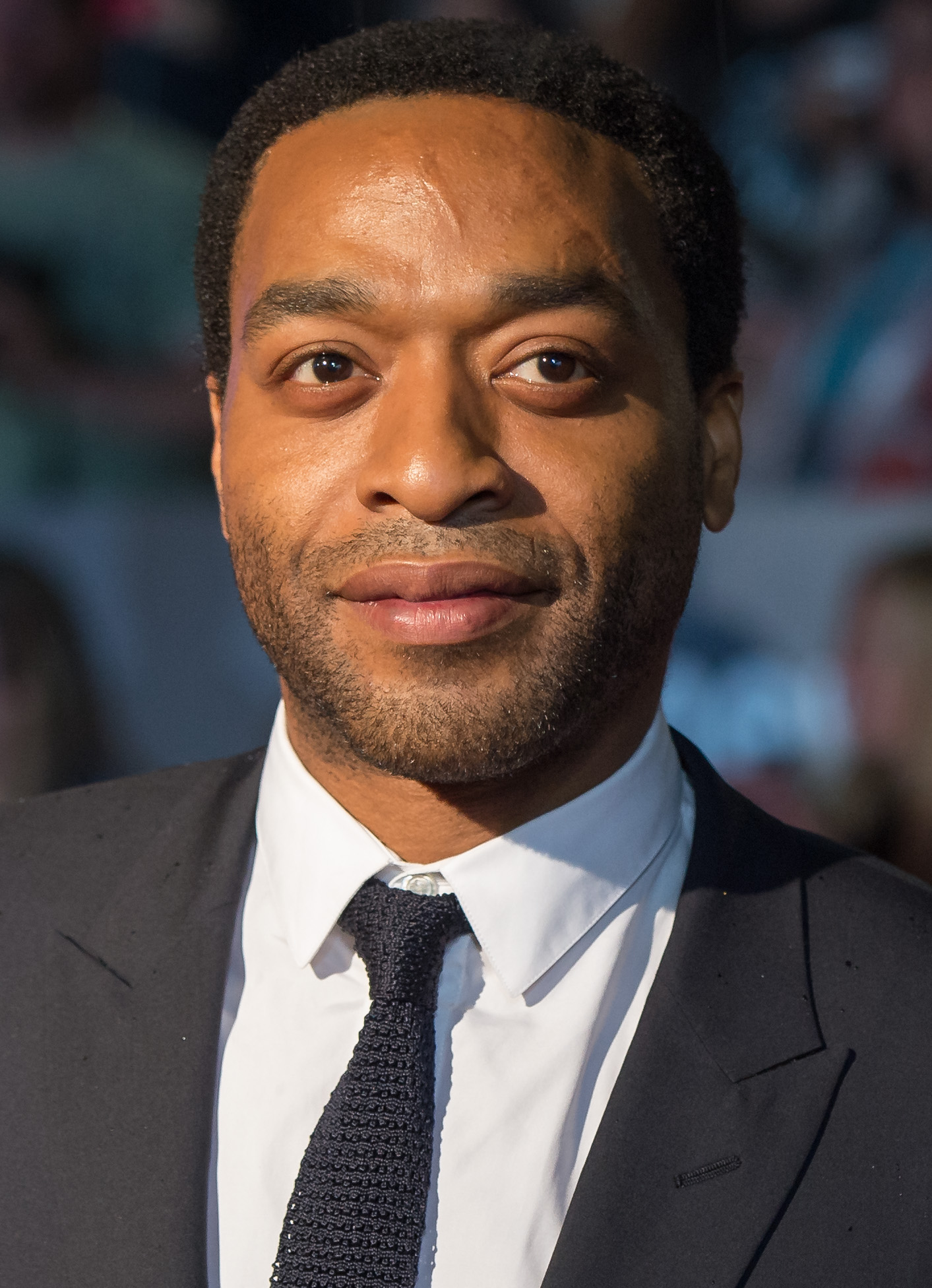
Chiwetel Ejiofor, Best Actor winner

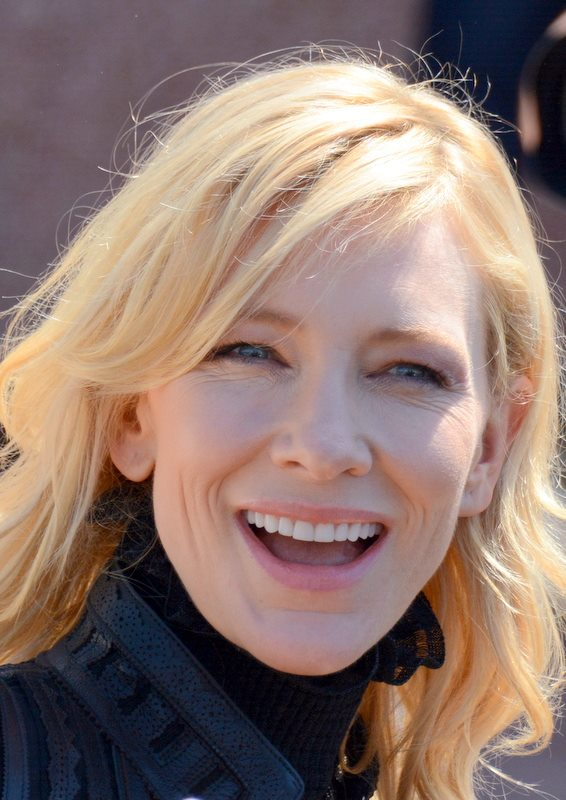
Cate Blanchett, Best Actress winner

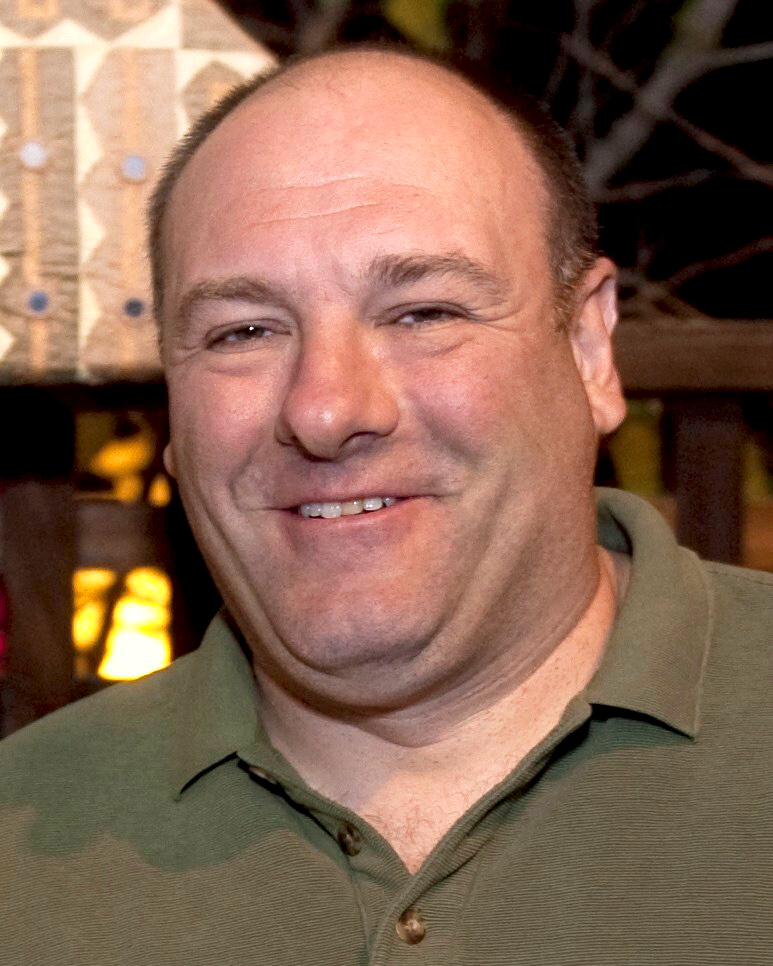
James Gandolfini, Best Supporting Actor winner

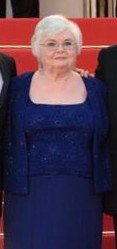
June Squibb, Best Supporting Actress winner

- Best Film:
  - 12 Years a Slave
  - Runner-up: The Wolf of Wall Street
- Best Actor:
  - Chiwetel Ejiofor – 12 Years a Slave
  - Runner-up: Leonardo DiCaprio – The Wolf of Wall Street
- Best Actress:
  - Cate Blanchett – Blue Jasmine
  - Runner-up: Brie Larson – Short Term 12
- Best Supporting Actor:
  - James Gandolfini – Enough Said
  - Runners-up: Barkhad Abdi – Captain Phillips and Jared Leto – Dallas Buyers Club
- Best Supporting Actress:
  - June Squibb – Nebraska
  - Runner-up: Lupita Nyong'o – 12 Years a Slave
- Best Director:
  - Steve McQueen – 12 Years a Slave
  - Runner-up: Martin Scorsese – The Wolf of Wall Street
- Best Screenplay:
  - Nicole Holofcener – Enough Said
  - Runner-up: Terence Winter – The Wolf of Wall Street
- Best Cinematography:
  - Emmanuel Lubezki – Gravity
  - Runner-up: Philippe Le Sourd – The Grandmaster
- Best Foreign Language Film:
  - Wadjda
  - Runner-up: Blue Is the Warmest Colour
- Best Documentary:
  - The Act of Killing
  - Runner-up: Blackfish
- Best Animated Film:
  - The Wind Rises
  - Runner-up: Frozen
- Best Editing:
  - Daniel P. Hanley and Mike Hill – Rush
  - Runner-up: Thelma Schoonmaker – The Wolf of Wall Street
- Best New Filmmaker:
  - Ryan Coogler – Fruitvale Station
  - Runner-up: Joshua Oppenheimer – The Act of Killing
- Best Ensemble Cast:
  - Nebraska
  - Runner-up: The Wolf of Wall Street
- Best Use of Music in a Film:
  - Inside Llewyn Davis
  - Runner-up: Nebraska
