= Frogs (film) =

1972 film by George McCowan

- Theatrical release poster
- Directed by: George McCowan
- Screenplay by: Robert Hutchison; Robert Blees
- Story by: Robert Hutchison
- Produced by: George Edwards; Peter Thomas
- Starring: Ray Milland; Sam Elliott; Joan Van Ark; Adam Roarke; Judy Pace; Lynn Borden; Mae Mercer; David Gilliam
- Cinematography: Mario Tosi
- Edited by: Fred R. Feitshans Jr.
- Music by: Les Baxter
- Distributed by: American International Pictures; Peter Thomas Productions
- Release date: March 23, 1972 (Florida)
- Running time: 90 minutes
- Country: United States
- Language: English
- Box office: $1.9 million

Frogs is a 1972 American natural horror film directed by George McCowan. The film falls into the "eco-horror" category, telling the story of a wildlife photographer who meets an upper-class U.S. Southern family who are victimized by several different animal species, including snakes, birds, leeches, lizards, and butterflies. The movie suggests nature may be justified in exacting revenge on this family because of its patriarch's abuse of the local ecology. The film was theatrically released on March 23, 1972.

== Plot ==
Wildlife photographer Pickett Smith is taking photographs of the local flora and fauna as he canoes through a swamp surrounding the island mansion estate of the wealthy and influential Crockett family. Through the swamp are numerous indicators of pollution, which Smith believes are connected to pesticide use on the island plantation. After Clint Crockett accidentally tips over Smith's canoe while hot-rodding in his speedboat, he and his sister, Karen, escort Smith to a mansion where he meets the entire family. The family's grouchy patriarch, Jason, intends to spend the next day enjoying both the Fourth of July and his birthday celebrations uninterrupted. Smith tries to call out with the household phone, but it is now dead. Then, Jason sends his employee, Grover, to eliminate the overpopulating frogs. Smith later discovers Grover's corpse covered in snake bites in a nearby swamp not far from Jason's house. Jason orders him not to mention it to anyone else.

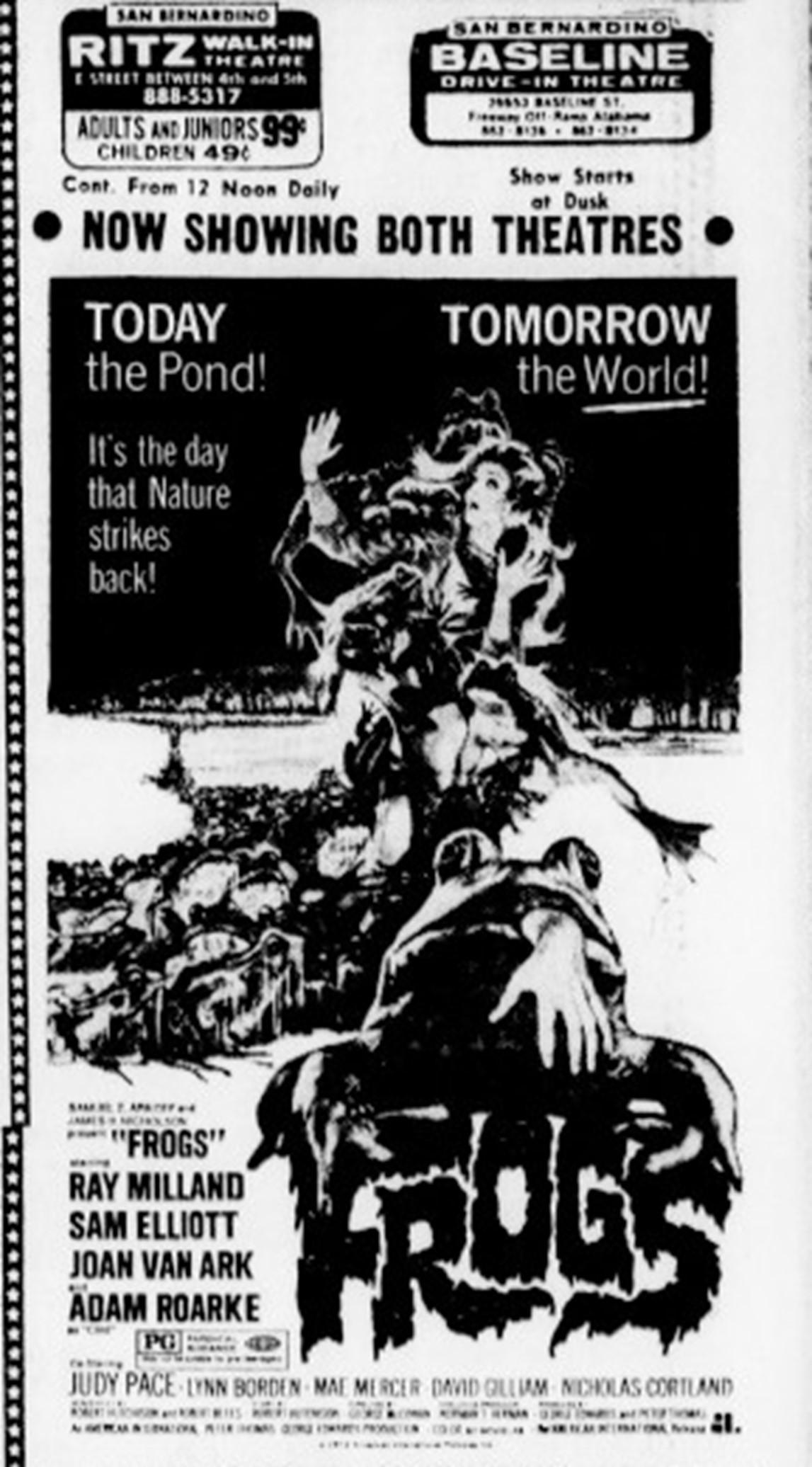
Advertisement from 1972

Early the next morning, Jason's grandson, Michael Martindale, sets out to check on a downed power line. Distracted by an impromptu hunting session, he accidentally shoots himself in the calf and is rendered immobile by strange Spanish moss, which comes to life and strangles him. Tarantulas descend from branches and bite him to death.

Back at Jason's house, Jason's daughter and Michael's mother, Iris, sends her other son, Kenneth, into a greenhouse to collect white daisies for a centerpiece. As he gathers the flowers, dozens of tokay geckos and tegu enter and knock over poison, whose toxic gas asphyxiates Kenneth. Seeing the danger posed by the animals, Smith suggests that everyone leave the island, but Jason is adamant that nothing will ruin his birthday.

As the other reptiles kill Iris and her husband, family butler Charles, maid Maybelle, and Kenneth's fiancée, Bella Garrington, decide to follow Smith's advice and leave. Clint takes them across the lake in his speedboat. As Clint investigates the abandoned dock, a flock of golden eagles attacks the other three, forcing them to flee. Clint discovers his boat is adrift and swims to reach it, but a water moccasin bites him to death. His wife, Jenny, tries to rescue him but gets stuck on the riverbank and is killed by an alligator snapping turtle.

Karen and Smith decide to leave with Clint and Jenny's children; Jason refuses to join them. They cross the lake in Smith's canoe, encountering an alligator and water moccasins, which Smith dispatches with a boat paddle and a shotgun. They make it to shore, where they discover Charles, Maybelle, and Bella's bloodied belongings. They reach the road and hitch a ride with a woman and her son, Bobby, whom tell their guests about the absence of highway traffic. As they head towards Jefferson City, Bobby shows them a huge frog he took from summer camp.

That night, now alone in his mansion (with his dog, Colonel), Jason witnesses hundreds of frogs breaking into the house and staring at him. The phone rings, but the line is still dead when he answers it. As the atmosphere intensifies, he collapses and dies as the frogs swarm him. Every light in the mansion goes out.

In the ending credits, an animated frog appears with a human hand in its mouth. The frog swallows the hand before hopping away.

== Cast ==
Actor	Role
Ray Milland	Jason Crockett
Sam Elliott	Pickett Smith
Joan Van Ark	Karen Crockett
Adam Roarke	Clint Crockett
Lynn Borden	Jenny Crockett
Dale Willingham	Tina Crockett
Hal Hodges	Jay Crockett
Judy Pace	Bella Garrington
Mae Mercer	Maybelle
David Gilliam	Michael Martindale
Nicholas Cortland	Kenneth Martindale
George Skaff	Stuart Martindale
Hollis Irving	Iris Martindale
Lance Taylor Sr.	Charles
Carolyn Fitzsimmons	Bobby's Mother (credited as "Lady in Car")
Robert Sanders	Bobby (credited as "Young Boy in Car")

== Production ==
=== Development ===
Frogs marked the feature film directorial debut of George McCowan, a director of television episodes. It was co-produced by George Edwards at American International Pictures and Peter Thomas at Peter Thomas Productions. Barry Trivers was reported to have signed to write a screenplay based on a story written by Robert Hutchison. Hutchison and Robert Blees are credited for writing the screenplay in the final film.

=== Filming ===
Principal photography began on November 1, 1971 and wrapped on December 8, 1971. The film was shot by Mario Tosi in Walton County, Florida, on the Emerald Coast in and around Wesley House, an old Southern mansion located in Eden Gardens State Park in the town of Point Washington, situated on Tucker Bayou off Choctawhatchee Bay.

The animals used for the film included 500 Florida frogs, 100 cane toads, scorpions, tarantulas, Argentine black and white tegus, geckos, iguanas, Eastern diamondback rattlesnakes, alligators, Florida cottonmouths, crabs, and alligator snapping turtles. In pre-release prints and the trailer, Iris Martindale (Holly Irving) originally died by being pulled into quicksand by a giant butterfly, rather than by snakebite. A bedroom scene with Bella Garrington (Judy Pace) and Kenneth Martindale (Nicholas Cortland) was scripted and shot, but was cut. For Michael Martindale's (David Gilliam) death, the tarantulas were refrigerated to slow them down when moving across Gilliam. The scene where an alligator is shot by Pickett Smith (Sam Elliott) was reused from the 1970 film Bloody Mama.

The makeup effects were done by Jean Austin and Thomas R. Burman.

=== Casting ===
Actors and actresses cast for the film included Ray Milland, Sam Elliott, Joan Van Ark, Adam Roarke, Lynn Borden, Dale Willingham, Hal Hodges, Judy Pace, Mae Mercer, David Gilliam, Nicholas Cortland, George Skaff, Hollis Irving, Lance Taylor Sr., Carolyn Fitzsimmons, and Robert Sanders. McCowan made the cast feel comfortable and supported, though Thomas deliberately kept them in the dark about the nature of their characters' deaths to make their scared reactions to the animals genuine. Milland, who played Jason Crockett due to his decreasing finances, disliked working on the film; he wore a toupee during production, which fell off his head at various times due to sweat. Milland left three days before production wrapped, so a body double was used for Jason's death scene. Frogs was Elliott's first leading role and Van Ark and Gilliam's first film role. Van Ark was excited to work with Milland, who was her father Carroll Clement Van Ark's favorite actor, and described Elliott as "a class act, supportive both on and off the set". William Smith was also cast for the film, but did not appear for unknown reasons.

== Release ==
The film had its world premiere at the Florida Theatre in Panama City, Florida on March 23, 1972. After 17 days it had grossed $458,392 from 38 theatres.

== Reception ==
Frogs has a score of 26% on Rotten Tomatoes from 19 reviews. On Metacritic, the film has a weighted average score of 51 out of 100 based on reviews from four critics, indicating "mixed or average" reviews.

A reviewer from HorrorNews.net found it odd for a horror film to be titled Frogs when all the killings in the film are done by animals other than frogs and discussed the acting: "Sam Elliott is good as always. He manages to feel like the outsider while also feeling like part of the group. It makes his role work in ways that it might not work in someone else's control. Ray Milland is also fairly good as the patriarch of the Crockett family. He personifies that bullheaded 'you listen to me because I'm always right' attitude in such a believable manner that you think he is that guy. The rest of the cast isn't as great as these two, but their lack of good performance only helps to make their deaths more fun to watch. They overact or underact in the perfect ways to make the movie priceless."

Clyde Gilmour of The Toronto Star complained about the misleading advertisements showing a giant man-eating frog and was unimpressed with the sketchy supporting characters. But he was otherwise satisfied with the movie, finding strengths in its atmosphere, story, photography, direction and Milland's performance.

Frogs was shown on the MeTV show Svengoolie on January 8, 2022, and September 3, 2022.
