= Thomas P. Cullinan =

American dramatist

- Born: November 4, 1919; Cleveland, Ohio, U.S
- Died: June 11, 1995 (aged 75); Cleveland Heights, Ohio, U.S.
- Occupations: Novelist, playwright, television writer

Thomas P. Cullinan (November 4, 1919 – June 11, 1995) was an American novelist and playwright, as well as a writer for television. He is perhaps best known for his 1966 novel The Beguiled, which was made into two films of the same name, in 1971 and again in 2017.

== Early life ==
Cullinan was born and raised in Cleveland, Ohio, in an Irish Catholic family. He graduated from Cathedral Latin High School in 1938, and later attended Case Western Reserve University.

== Career ==
In addition to The Beguiled (1966), Cullinan's novel about a Union soldier recuperating at a girls school in Confederate Virginia during the Civil War, he wrote three novels—The Besieged (1970), The Eighth Sacrament (1977), and The Bedeviled (1978)—as well as several plays, which are still produced. He received a Ford Foundation grant to represent the United States at a literary colloquium in Berlin in 1964, and he wrote a weekly television program in his hometown of Cleveland, Ohio, both for WKYC, a local television affiliate, and for Case Western Reserve University. The Beguiled was twice made into a film: in 1971, directed by Don Siegel and starring Clint Eastwood and Geraldine Page; and in 2017, directed by Sofia Coppola and starring Nicole Kidman and Colin Farrell.

== Death ==
Cullinan died of a heart attack on June 11, 1995, at a local theater in Cleveland Heights where he was judging a high school playwrighting festival. Cullinan's papers are kept at the Kent State University archive, which include an unpublished play based on the Marilyn Sheppard murder case.

== Awards ==
- Cleveland Arts Prize (1971)
- Ford Foundation grants (1964 and 1966)

== Notable works ==
Books

- 1966: The Beguiled
- 1970: The Besieged
- 1974: The Roots of Social Injustice
- 1975: If the Eye Be Sound
- 1975: Paths Are Made by Those Who Walk on Them
- 1977: The Eighth Sacrament
- 1978: The Bedeviled
- 1988: Inherited Illusions: Integrating the Sacred & the Secular

Produced Plays

- 1969: Mrs. Lincoln
- 1970: The Attic
- 1996: The Rose of Tralee
- 2000: The Wayward Angel
