= The Beguiled (2017 film) =

2017 film by Sofia Coppola

- Theatrical release poster
- Directed by: Sofia Coppola
- Screenplay by: Sofia Coppola
- Based on: The Beguiled by Thomas P. Cullinan The Beguiled by: Albert Maltz; Grimes Grice
- Produced by: Youree Henley; Sofia Coppola
- Starring: Colin Farrell; Nicole Kidman; Kirsten Dunst; Elle Fanning
- Cinematography: Philippe Le Sourd
- Edited by: Sarah Flack
- Music by: Phoenix
- Production company: American Zoetrope
- Distributed by: Focus Features (United States); Universal Pictures (International)
- Release dates: May 24, 2017 (Cannes); June 23, 2017 (United States)
- Running time: 94 minutes
- Country: United States
- Language: English
- Budget: $10 million
- Box office: $27.9 million

The Beguiled is a 2017 American Southern Gothic thriller film written and directed by Sofia Coppola, based on the 1966 novel by Thomas P. Cullinan. It stars Colin Farrell, Nicole Kidman, Kirsten Dunst, and Elle Fanning. It is the second film adaptation of Cullinan's novel, following Don Siegel's 1971 film.

It premiered at the Cannes Film Festival on May 24, 2017, and was selected to compete for the Palme d'Or in its main competition section, where Coppola became just the second woman to win the Best Director award (after Yuliya Solntseva in 1961). The film was released theatrically in the United States on June 23, 2017, by Focus Features.

== Plot ==
Martha Farnsworth runs a girls' school in Virginia during the American Civil War. By 1864, almost all of the students, teachers, and slaves have left. In addition to Farnsworth herself, only five students and one teacher, Edwina Morrow, remain.

In the woods, the youngest student, Amy, comes across John McBurney, a corporal in the Union Army who was wounded in the leg during battle, and has since deserted. At the school, Farnsworth tends to his wounds and all the women and girls are fascinated by the handsome man.

Initially, some of the school's residents want McBurney to be delivered as a prisoner of war to the Confederate Army, but Farnsworth decides that they will let his leg heal before they decide, ostensibly to be a good Christian. When Confederate soldiers arrive at the school, Farnsworth does not tell them that a Union soldier is on the premises. While McBurney is recovering, the women and girls subtly vie for his affection by giving him presents, wearing jewelry, and preparing a lavish dinner for him. He returns their affection, which Farnsworth deduces is an attempt to win their favor and not be turned over to either army. When he is able to move again, he begins to help in the garden.

When Miss Farnsworth indicates that McBurney is healthy now and will have to leave the school in a few days, he tries to convince her to let him stay as a gardener but to no avail. Accepting his fate, he tells Edwina that he has fallen in love with her. That night, however, she finds him in bed with Alicia, the rebellious eldest pupil. McBurney tries to appease Edwina, but she pushes him away, causing him to fall down the stairs. Farnsworth and the rest of the girls hear the commotion and come to investigate, finding McBurney at the bottom of the stairs unconscious and with a badly fractured leg. Alicia claims that McBurney forced himself onto her and Edwina's intervention caused the accident. Farnsworth examines the injury and decides that the only way to save his life is to amputate his leg.

When he awakens days later and discovers he's lost his leg, McBurney is devastated and furious, accusing the women of doing so in revenge for him choosing Alicia over them. Farnsworth locks McBurney in the music room for their safety. When Alicia comes to visit, he threatens Alicia into giving him the key. He breaks out, steals Farnsworth's gun, and threatens the women before storming off. When Farnsworth sends Amy to the gate to signal McBurney's presence to Confederate troops, he pursues her at gunpoint to a shed, where Farnsworth rescues her by talking him down.

After McBurney storms out, Farnsworth and the students settle on killing McBurney by preparing him a dinner containing poisonous mushrooms. Edwina follows McBurney to his room, where she initiates sex. During the dinner, Edwina is unaware of the plan, and McBurney falls dead after eating the mushrooms.

While the students sew McBurney's body into a shroud, Edwina is devastated. The women drag McBurney's body to the road and attach the signal to the gate so that he will be found by the next Confederate soldiers who pass by.

== Cast ==
- Colin Farrell as Corporal John McBurney
- Nicole Kidman as Miss Martha Farnsworth
- Kirsten Dunst as Miss Edwina Morrow
- Elle Fanning as Alicia
- Oona Laurence as Amy
- Angourie Rice as Jane
- Addison Riecke as Marie
- Emma Howard as Emily
- Wayne Pere as the captain
- Matt Story as confederate soldier
- Joel Albin as cavalry man

== Production ==
The film is based on the 1966 book of the same name by author Thomas P. Cullinan about a wounded Union soldier in a Mississippi seminary during the American Civil War, and was made for under $10 million. The film exhibited elements of the thriller genre, a departure for Coppola.

Coppola had initially expressed an aversion to a remake, but after watching the 1971 version at the urging of production designer Anne Ross, she was left contemplating ways she could update the film. Specifically, she became interested in showing the story from the women's point of view, as opposed to the man's. The material came to Coppola at a time when she wanted to make a more optimistic film than The Bling Ring (2013), stating that she wanted to "cleanse myself" from what she terms was "such a tacky, ugly world". Coppola cited her fascination with the South as part of the story's attraction. Coppola has said that she "wanted the film to represent an exaggerated version of all the ways women were traditionally raised there just to be lovely and cater to men—the manners of that whole world, and how they change when the men go away." Coppola has cited Gone with the Wind (1939) as her inspiration for creating a film that was relatable despite its position within a different era.

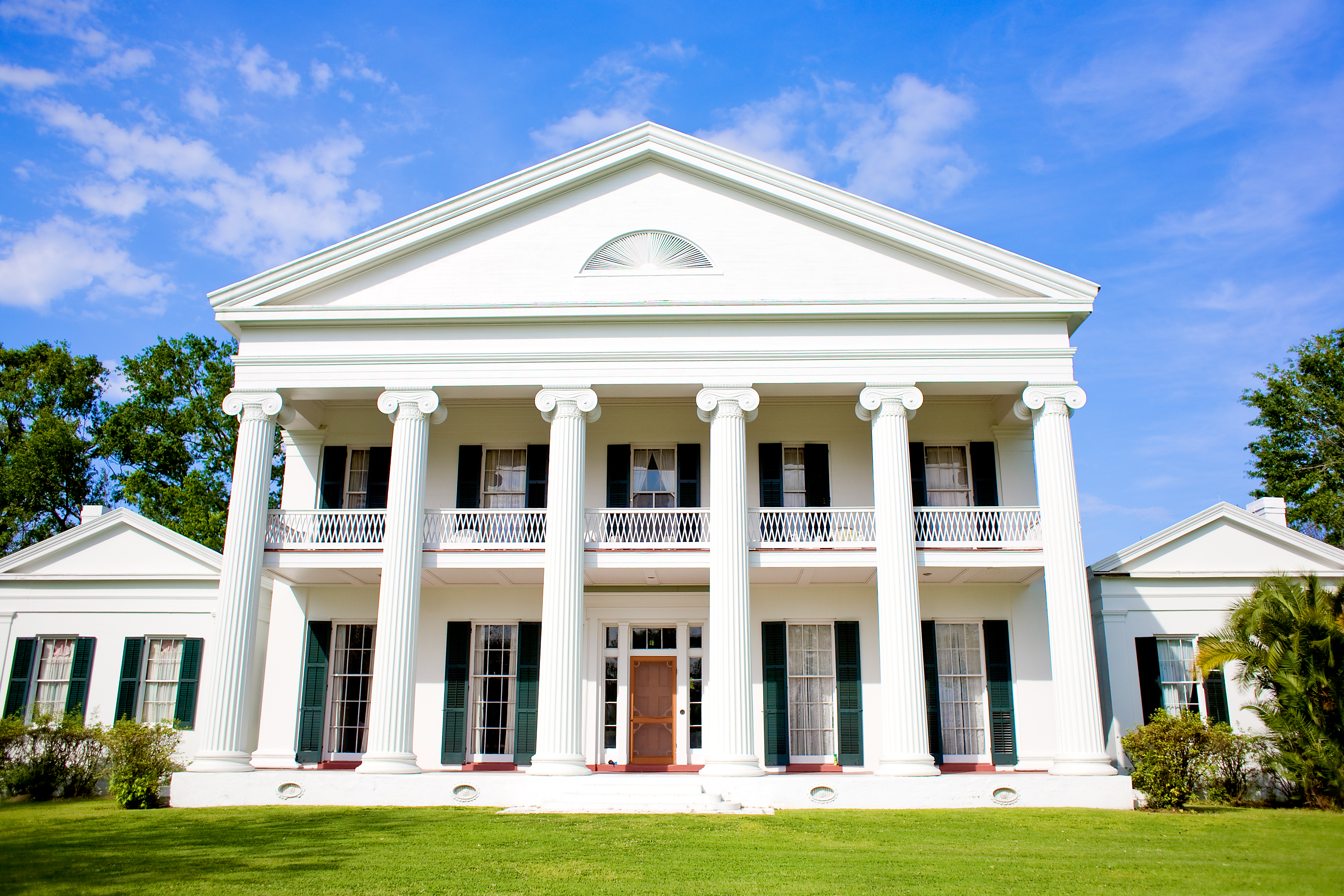
The Madewood Plantation House

In March 2016, it was announced that Elle Fanning, Nicole Kidman, and Kirsten Dunst were in talks to appear in the film, and had been signed by July, when Colin Farrell entered talks. Based on a Magnificat from Monteverdi's Vespro della Beata Vergine, the music for the film was composed by the rock band Phoenix (whose lead singer, Thomas Mars, is married to Coppola). Two popular Civil War ballads, "Lorena" and "Aura Lea", were used in the film, in addition to Stephen Foster's "Virginia Belle". Most of the costumes in the film were designed by Stacey Battat, who used the costume and fabric archives of the Metropolitan Museum of Art to gain inspiration for contemporary fashion. Corsets were made for each actress, while for historical accuracy only cotton fabric was used, which was in turn either stone washed or enzyme washed to weather the fabrics and make them look worn in.

Principal photography began on October 31, 2016, and concluded on December 7, 2016. Exterior scenes were shot on the grounds of the Madewood Plantation House, near Napoleonville, Louisiana. Interiors were filmed in actress Jennifer Coolidge's house in New Orleans.

== Release ==
The film had its world premiere at the 2017 Cannes Film Festival, where Coppola won the Best Director Award, making her the second woman to ever win in that category, 56 years after the first female director won. The film began a limited theatrical release in the United States on June 23, 2017, before expanding to a wide release on June 30, 2017.

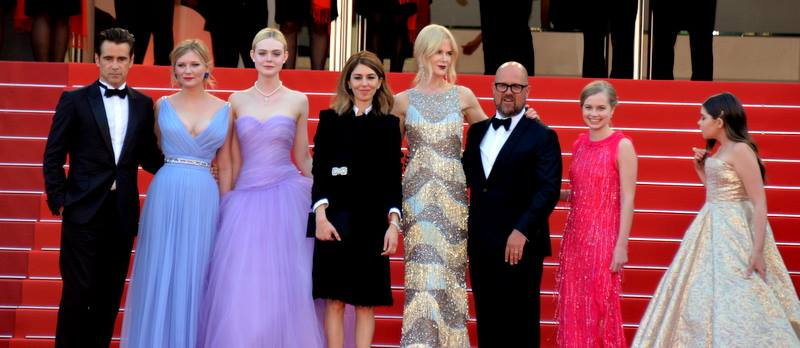
Colin Farrell, Kirsten Dunst, Elle Fanning, Sofia Coppola, Nicole Kidman, Youree Henley, and Angourie Rice at the 2017 Cannes Film Festival

== Reception ==
=== Box office ===
The Beguiled grossed $10.7 million in the United States and Canada, and $17.2 million in other territories, for a worldwide total of $27.9 million.

In the film's limited opening weekend, it made $240,545 from four theaters (a per-theater gross of $60,136), finishing 20th at the box office. In its wide opening, it made $3.2 million from 674 theaters (an average of $4,694), finishing 8th at the box office.

=== Critical response ===
On the review aggregator website Rotten Tomatoes, the film holds an approval rating of 79% based on 326 reviews, with an average rating of 7.1/10. The website's critics consensus reads, "The Beguiled adds just enough extra depth to its source material to set itself apart, and director Sofia Coppola's restrained touch is enlivened by strong performances from the cast." Metacritic, which uses a weighted average, assigned the film a score of 77 out of 100, based on 45 critics, indicating "generally favorable" reviews.

David Ehrlich of IndieWire gave the film an "A−", saying, "Coppola's film is told with surgical precision and savage grace." Todd McCarthy of The Hollywood Reporter stated: "Other than to place slightly more emphasis on the female empowerment angle ... it's hard to detect a strong raison d'etre behind Sofia Coppola's slow-to-develop melodrama."

=== Accolades ===
| Award | Date | Category | Recipient(s) | Result | Ref. |
|---|---|---|---|---|---|
| Austin Film Critics Association | 2018 | Best Adapted Screenplay | Sofia Coppola | Nominated | |
| Awards Circuit Community Awards | 2017 | Best Costume Design | Stacey Battat | Nominated | |
| Cannes Film Festival | 2017 | Best Director | Sofia Coppola | Won | |
| Cannes Film Festival | 2017 | Palme d'Or | Sofia Coppola | Nominated | |
| CineLibri International Book and Movie Festival | 2017 | Grand Prize for the Best Literary Adaptation | Sofia Coppola | Nominated | |
| Dublin Film Critics Circle Awards | 2017 | Best Cinematography | Philippe Le Sourd | Nominated | |
| International Online Cinema Awards (Halfway Award) | 2018 | Best Director | Sofia Coppola | Won | |
| International Online Cinema Awards (Halfway Award) | 2018 | Best Actress | Nicole Kidman | Nominated | |
| International Online Cinema Awards (Halfway Award) | 2018 | Best Adapted Screenplay | Sofia Coppola | Won | |
| International Online Cinema Awards (Halfway Award) | 2018 | Best Ensemble Performance | Colin Farrell, Nicole Kidman, Kirsten Dunst, Elle Fanning, Oona Laurence, Angourie Rice, Addison Riecke, Emma Howard, Wayne Pére, Matt Story | Won | |
| International Online Cinema Awards (Halfway Award) | 2018 | Best Cinematography | Philippe Le Sourd | Nominated | |
| International Online Cinema Awards (Halfway Award) | 2018 | Best Original Score | Laura Karpman and Phoenix | Nominated | |
| International Online Cinema Awards (Halfway Award) | 2018 | Best Costume Design | Stacey Battat | Runner-up | |
| International Online Cinema Awards (Halfway Award) | 2018 | Best Production Design | Anne Ross | Nominated | |
| Jerusalem Film Festival | 2017 | Best International Film | The Beguiled | Nominated | |
| London Critics Circle Film Awards | 2018 | British/Irish Actor of the Year | Colin Farrell | Nominated | |
| Los Angeles Online Film Critics Society Awards | 2017 | Best Female Director | Sofia Coppola | Nominated | |
| Munich Film Festival | 2017 | Best International Film | The Beguiled | Nominated | |
| Phoenix Critics Circle | 2017 | Best Mystery or Thriller Film | The Beguiled | Nominated | |
| San Diego Film Critics Society Awards | 2017 | Best Adapted Screenplay | Sofia Coppola | Nominated | |
| San Diego Film Critics Society Awards | 2017 | Best Costume Design | Stacey Battat | Nominated | |
| San Diego Film Critics Society Awards | 2017 | Best Production Design | Anne Ross | Nominated | |
| Satellite Awards | 2018 | Best Costume Design | Stacey Battat | Nominated | |
| Zagreb Film Festival | 2017 | Best Film | The Beguiled | Nominated | |

== Controversies ==
=== Accusations of whitewashing ===
The film faced a wave of controversy and division, including accusations of "whitewashing" the original story after Coppola chose to remove the supporting role of a black female slave from the film and cast Kirsten Dunst as a character who was biracial in the original novel. Coppola also faced criticism for minimizing the story of the people experiencing actual hardship in favor of depicting, albeit authentically, the lavish lifestyle of her protagonists, thus minimizing the importance of a weighty topic, which was not the first time one of Coppola's films was said to expose the sociocultural affordances of her own childhood. Coppola responded to these allegations by stating that she made the changes so as "not [to] brush over such an important topic in a light way," and that "[y]oung girls watch my films and this was not the depiction of an African American character I would want to show them." She furthermore cited the presence of young girls among her moviegoing audience, and described her version of the film as a reinterpretation, rather than a remake, of Don Siegel's 1971 adaption of the same book. Coppola wanted to tell the story of the male soldier entering into a classically southern and female environment from the point of view of the women in order to represent that experience. Coppola thought that the earlier version made the characters out to be unrealistic caricatures, which did not allow the viewer to connect with them.

While some critics stated that Coppola intended The Beguiled as a feminist work, Coppola has explained that she was not in favor of that labeling. Though she has said she is happy if others see the film in this way, she sees it as a film, rather, that possesses a female perspective—an important distinction. The Beguiled was also made as a contrast to The Bling Ring, and Coppola has explained the need to correct that film's harsh Los Angeles aesthetic with something more beautiful and poetic.

== See also ==
- The Beguiled (1971 film)
