= Sofia Coppola =

American filmmaker and actress (born 1971)

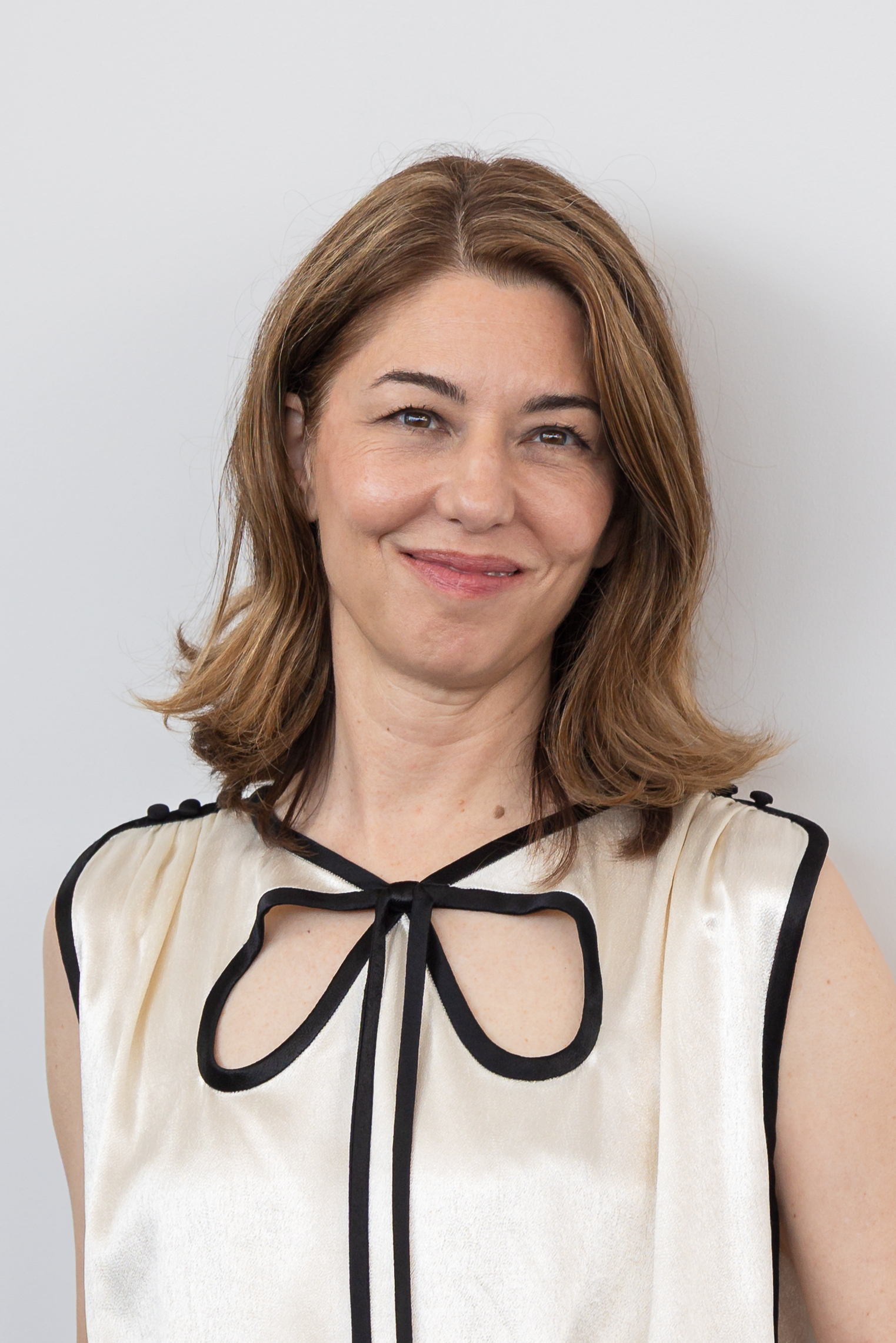
- Coppola at the Venice Film Festival in 2025
- Born: Sofia Carmina Coppola; May 14, 1971 (age 55); New York City, U.S.
- Other name: Domino Coppola
- Occupations: Film director; screenwriter; producer; actress
- Years active: 1972–present
- Known for: Full list
- Title: Co-owner of American Zoetrope
- Spouses: Spike Jonze (m. 1999; div. 2003) Thomas Mars (m. 2011)
- Children: 2, including Romy Mars
- Parents: Francis Ford Coppola (father); Eleanor Neil (mother)
- Relatives: Coppola family
- Awards: Full list

Sofia Carmina Coppola (/ˈkoʊpələ/ KOH-pə-lə; born May 14, 1971 in New York) is an American filmmaker and former actress. She has received various accolades, including an Academy Award, two Golden Globe Awards, a Golden Lion, (Note: At the 67th Venice International Film Festival, Coppola became the first American woman (and fourth American filmmaker) to win the Golden Lion in the festival's history.) and a Cannes Film Festival Award (Note: At the 2017 Cannes Film Festival, Coppola became the second woman (and first American woman) to win Best Director in the festival's history.) as well as nominations for three BAFTA Awards and a Primetime Emmy Award.

Her parents are filmmakers Eleanor and Francis Ford Coppola, and she made her acting debut as an infant in her father's acclaimed crime drama The Godfather (1972). Coppola later appeared in several music videos and had a supporting role in the fantasy comedy film Peggy Sue Got Married (1986). She then portrayed Mary Corleone, the daughter of Michael Corleone, in the sequel The Godfather Part III (1990).

Coppola transitioned into filmmaking with her feature-length directorial debut in the coming-of-age drama The Virgin Suicides (1999). It was the first of her collaborations with actress Kirsten Dunst. Coppola received the Academy Award for Best Original Screenplay for the comedy-drama Lost in Translation (2003), and was nominated for the Academy Award for Best Director, (Note: At the 76th Academy Awards, Coppola also became the first American woman and the youngest woman to be nominated in the directing category.) becoming the third woman to do so. She has since directed the historical drama Marie Antoinette (2006), the family drama Somewhere (2010), the satirical crime drama The Bling Ring (2013), the southern gothic thriller The Beguiled (2017), the comedy On the Rocks (2020), and the biographical drama Priscilla (2023).

Coppola released the Netflix Christmas musical comedy special A Very Murray Christmas (2015), which earned her a nomination for the Primetime Emmy Award for Outstanding Television Movie.

== Early life ==
Coppola was born in New York City on May 14, 1971, the youngest child and only daughter of documentarian Eleanor (née Neil) and filmmaker Francis Ford Coppola. She is the only granddaughter of Carmine Coppola and Italia Pennino, who were both of Italian descent (Lucanian and Neapolitan). Her mother has Irish ancestry. She was raised on her parents' farm in Rutherford, California. At 15, Coppola interned with Chanel. Coppola graduated from St. Helena High School in 1990. She first studied at Mills College and transferred to the California Institute of the Arts from 1993 to 1994 to focus on painting. Thereafter, she attended Art Center College of Design, where she was mentored by Paul Jasmin. After dropping out of college, Coppola started a clothing line called Milkfed, which is now sold exclusively in Japan.

Coppola had many varying interests growing up, including fashion, photography, music, and design, and did not initially intend to become a filmmaker. However, after making her first short film Lick the Star in 1998, she realized it "brought together all the things [she] loved", and decided to continue her directing pursuits.

== Career ==
=== 1972–1999: Acting career ===
Coppola's acting career, marked by frequent criticisms of nepotism and negative reviews, began while she was an infant, as she made background appearances in eight of her father's films. The best known of these is her appearance in The Godfather as the infant Michael Francis Rizzi, in the baptism scene. Coppola also acted in her father's films The Outsiders (1983), in a scene where Matt Dillon, Tommy Howell, and Ralph Macchio are eating at a Dairy Queen; Rumble Fish (1983); The Cotton Club (1984); and Peggy Sue Got Married (1986), in which she portrayed Kathleen Turner's sister Nancy. Frankenweenie (1984) was the first film Coppola performed in that was not associated with her father, however, it often goes unnoticed due to her stage name "Domino", which she adopted at the time because she thought it was glamorous. A short film entitled Life Without Zoe (1989), released as part of a tripartite anthology film New York Stories, was co-written by a teenage Coppola and her father; her father also directed the film. During the time, she partnered with Roman Coppola on a production company with funding from American Zoetrope in 1988 to produce low-budget movies, Commercial Pictures.

Coppola returned to her father's Godfather trilogy in both the second and third Godfather films, playing an immigrant child in The Godfather Part II and playing Michael Corleone's daughter, Mary, in The Godfather Part III after the originally cast actress, Winona Ryder, dropped out of the film at the last minute due to nervous exhaustion. It has been suggested that Coppola's performance in The Godfather Part III damaged Francis Ford Coppola's career and ruined Sofia's before it had even begun. Coppola has said that she never really wanted to act and only did it to help out when her father asked her to. It has also been suggested that Sofia's role in the film may have affected its box office performance, which started strongly and then went into decline. Coppola herself worried that she had only been given the role because she was the director's daughter, and the role placed a strain on her during the time of shooting that her mother observed in a series of diaries she wrote for Vogue during the filming. Coppola later stated that she was not hurt by the criticism from her work in the film because she never especially wanted an acting career.

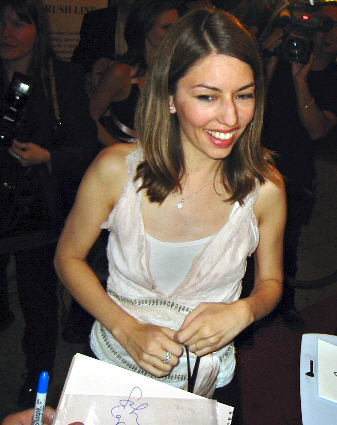
Coppola in 2003

After she was critically panned for her performance in The Godfather Part III (for which she was named "Worst Supporting Actress" and "Worst New Star" at the 1990 Golden Raspberry Awards), Coppola largely ended her acting career. However, she did appear in the independent film Inside Monkey Zetterland (1992), as well as in the backgrounds of films by her friends and family (for example, she appeared as Saché, one of Queen Padmé Amidala's five handmaidens, in George Lucas' 1999 film Star Wars: Episode I – The Phantom Menace).

Coppola also appeared in several 1990s music videos: the Black Crowes' "Sometimes Salvation"; Sonic Youth's "Mildred Pierce"; Madonna's "Deeper and Deeper"; the Chemical Brothers' "Elektrobank", which was directed by her then-husband Spike Jonze; and later Phoenix's "Funky Squaredance".

=== 1998–2003: Directorial debut and acclaim ===
The Virgin Suicides (1999)

Coppola's first short film was Lick the Star (1998). It played many times on the Independent Film Channel. She made her feature film directing debut with The Virgin Suicides (1999), the film adaptation of the novel The Virgin Suicides by Jeffrey Eugenides. It received critical acclaim upon its premiere in North America at the 2000 Sundance Film Festival and was released later that year. Coppola was first drawn to the story after reading the book by Jeffrey Eugenides in 1995, at the recommendation of musician Thurston Moore. Coppola said she felt the novel's author understood the teenage experience. She has also said that if not for the book, she may not have had a career in film. Specifically, Coppola has highlighted the representation of teenagers "lazing around", a situation she connected with but felt was not seen very much in films in any relatable way. The story's theme of loss was a personal connection for Coppola in light of the 1986 death of her oldest brother in a boating accident, though she stated that she did not immediately realize this connection. Coppola secured the rights to the novel and adapted the screenplay herself. The low-budget film drew praise from critics and represented the point at which Coppola became a filmmaker independent of her family connections. She credits the start of her career to the Cannes festival after the film premiered there. The film stars actors Danny DeVito, Kirsten Dunst, Scott Glenn, Josh Hartnett, Michael Paré, Jonathan Tucker, Kathleen Turner, and James Woods.

Lost in Translation (2003)

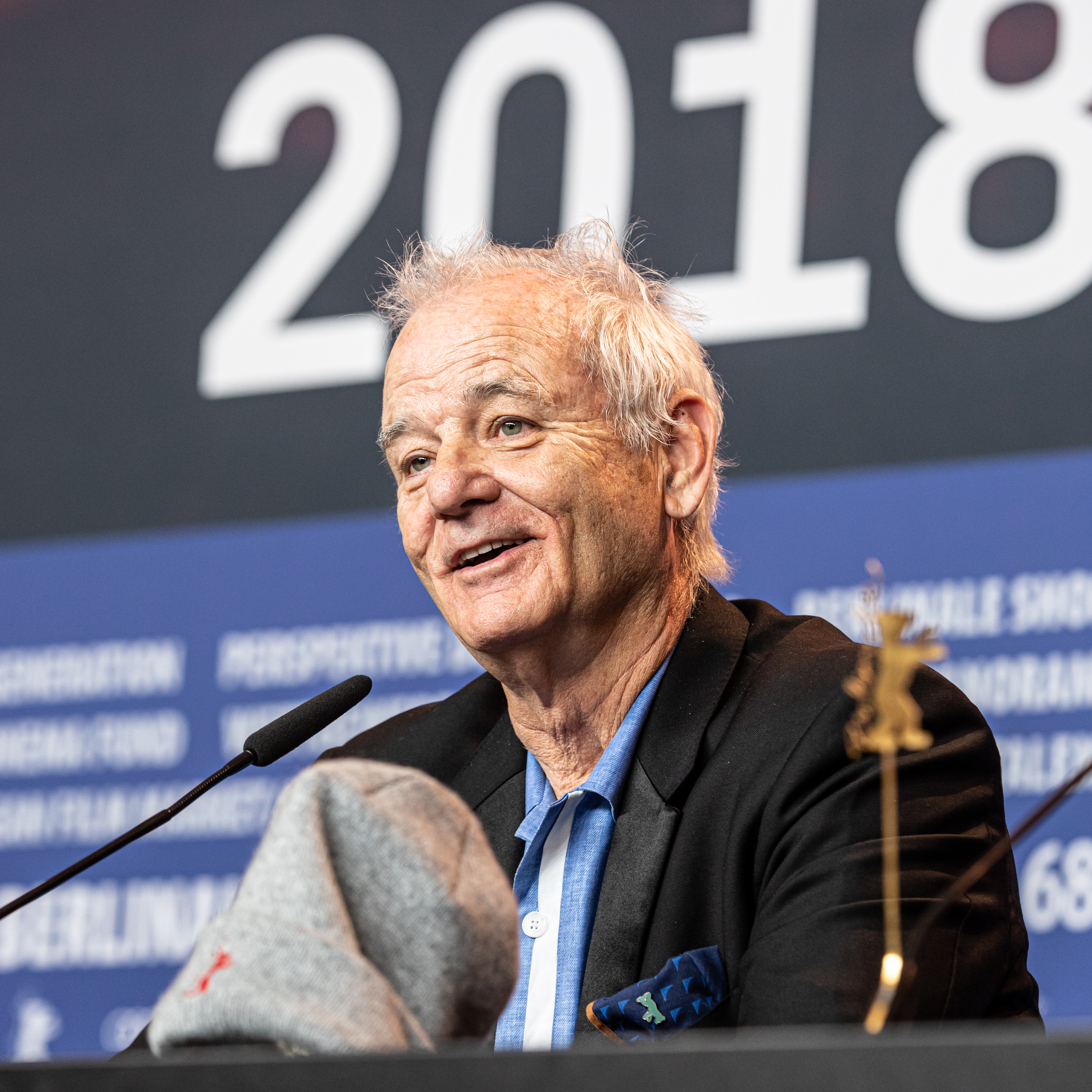
Coppola has collaborated with Bill Murray on three projects including Lost in Translation (2003).

Coppola's second feature Lost in Translation (2003) won her the Academy Award for best original screenplay and three Golden Globe Awards including Best Picture Musical or Comedy. After Lina Wertmüller and Jane Campion, Coppola became the third female director to be nominated for an Academy Award for Directing and the second to win the Original Screenplay award, after Campion in 1994 (Wertmüller was also nominated). Her win for the best original screenplay in 2003 made her a third-generation Oscar winner. Coppola was the second woman, after Edith Head, to be nominated for three Oscars in one night. In 2004, Coppola was invited to join the Academy of Motion Picture Arts and Sciences. Coppola shot Lost in Translation in 27 days, with a small crew, working without permits. Scenes were filmed impromptu on the street, while scenes shot at the Park Hyatt Hotel allowed the crew to use its corridors between two and three in the morning without disturbing guests. The film contains some iconic stills that effectively portray the general aesthetic Coppola was striving to achieve. In an interview she claimed ‘for each film I usually put together a book of images, and they’re probably about 20 pages or more’ she then soon goes on to say that Lost In Translation ‘started as these abstract images of the city and of a girl lying around a room’ .

The film faced several controversies including accusations of anti-Asian racism and Orientalism. The organization Asian Mediawatch lobbied against the film's Academy Award nominations, stating the film "dehumanizes the Japanese people by portraying them as a collection of shallow stereotypes who are treated with disregard and disdain." They further argued that such characterizations perpetuate negative attitudes that harm Asian Americans within the United States, citing an existing climate of anti-Asian sentiment. The group also directed criticism at Coppola, asserting, "Had this film been set in Africa or Mexico, for example, we do not think Ms. Coppola would have given such an insensitive and racist portrayal of a people." In The Guardian, Kiku Day accused the film of "anti-Japanese racism", arguing that "Coppola's negative stereotyping of the Japanese makes her more the thinking person's Sylvester Stallone than a cinematic genius. Good luck to the director for getting away with it, but what on earth are people with some semblance of taste doing saluting it?" Coppola responded to these accusations in an interview for The Independent, "I can see why people might think that, but I know I'm not racist … I guess someone has misunderstood my intentions. It bugs me, because I know I'm not racist."

In 2024, during an interview with The New Yorker, Coppola acknowledged that certain aspects of the film had not aged well, stating, "It was a different time … I haven't thought about how I would approach it now, but probably not in the same way."

=== 2006–2017: Established career ===
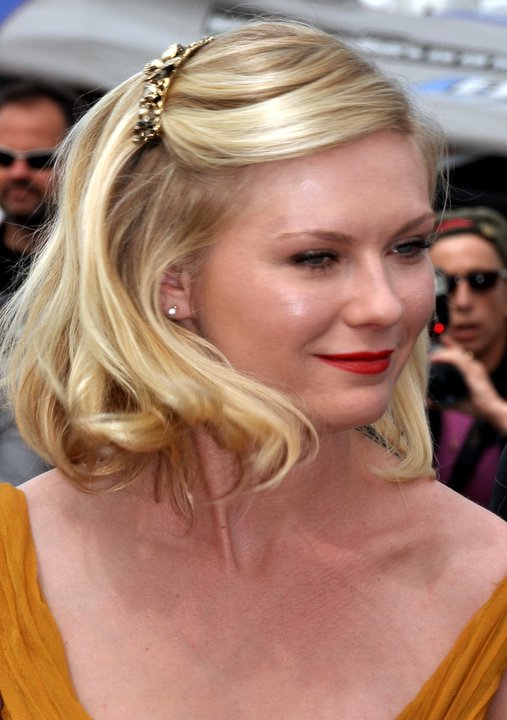
Coppola first collaborated with Dunst in The Virgin Suicides (1999).

Marie Antoinette (2006)

Her third film was the biopic Marie Antoinette (2006), adapted from the biography by British historian Antonia Fraser. Kirsten Dunst plays the titular character and Jason Schwartzman, Coppola's cousin, plays King Louis XVI. The film debuted at the 2006 Cannes Film Festival where, despite boos in the audience, it received a standing ovation. Though critics were divided at the time of its release, it has since received a cult following and more critical acclaim in the years that followed. Peter Bradshaw of The Guardian declared, "Sofia Coppola's presentation of Marie's life has a sisterly, unjudging intimacy, and the director has carried off pert inventions and provocations with some style, combining dazzling visual tableaux and formal set-pieces in strict period, with new wave chart hits from the 1970s and 80s: these musical anachronisms lending ironic torsion to the overall effect."

Marie Antoinette was shot on location at the Château de Versailles. Coppola herself has claimed that she was initially drawn towards the character of Marie Antoinette as an innocent and caring character who found herself in a situation outside of her control, and that rather than creating a historical representation, she wanted to create a more intimate look into the world of the heroine. Coppola was interested in making an emotional connection to the young royalty whose "coming-of-age took place under conditions familiar to a pampered zoo animal". The film's style is not that of a traditional biopic, and instead utilizes "hit songs and incongruous dialogue". The film received the Academy Award for Best Costume Design as well as three BAFTA Awards nominations.

Somewhere (2010)

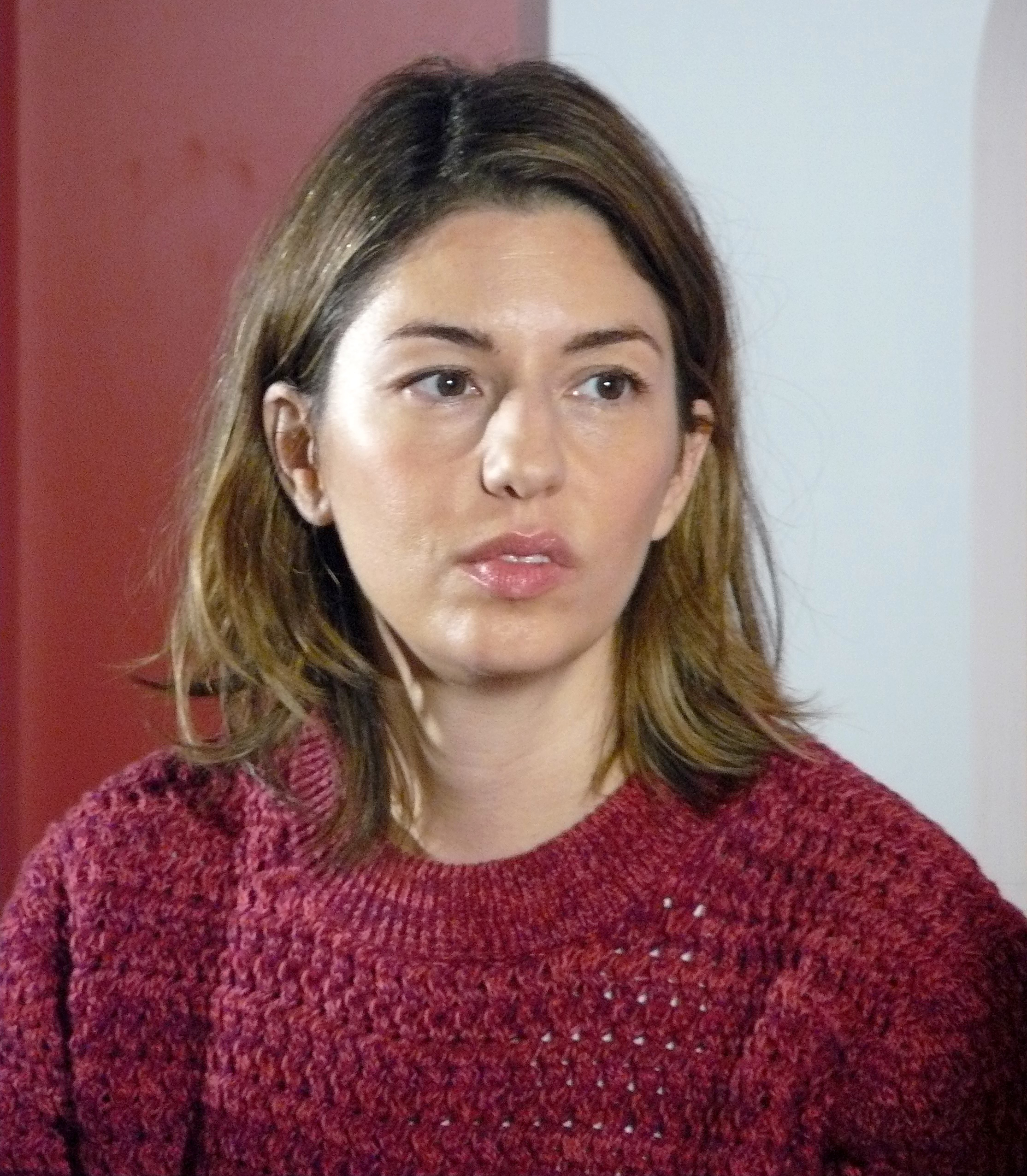
Coppola in 2010

Coppola's fourth film was Somewhere (2010), filmed at Chateau Marmont. It depicts a newly famous actor (Stephen Dorff) recuperating from a minor injury whose wealth, fame, and professional experiences cannot alleviate the existential crisis he is experiencing, as he is forced to care for his 11-year-old daughter Cleo (Elle Fanning) in the absence of his wife. The relationship between Marco and Cleo was loosely based on Coppola's own relationship with her father. The film premiered at the 67th Venice International Film Festival, and opened in the rest of Italy, on September 3, 2010. The festival jury unanimously awarded the film the Golden Lion prize for the best overall film. Quentin Tarantino, president of the jury, said the film "grew and grew in our hearts, in our minds, in our affections" after the first screening. The film continued to receive critical acclaim, especially from notable film critic Roger Ebert of the Chicago Sun-Times who praised the detail in the portrait of Johnny Marco, writing, "Coppola is a fascinating director. She sees, and we see exactly what she sees. There is little attempt here to observe a plot. All the attention is on the handful of characters, on Johnny." In November 2010, Coppola was interviewed by Joel Coen, who professed his admiration of her work, at the DGA screening of Somewhere in New York City.

The Bling Ring (2013)

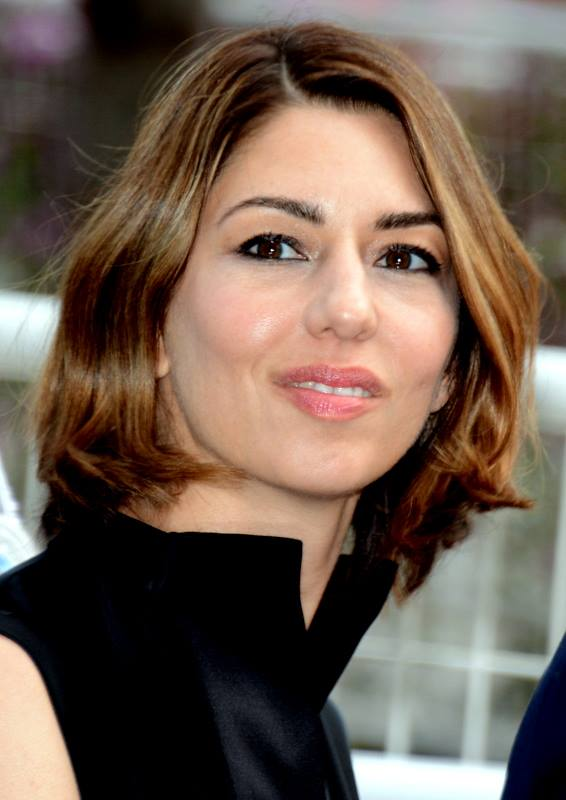
Coppola in 2014

Coppola's next film, The Bling Ring (2013), was based on actual events centered around the Bling Ring, a group of California teenagers who burgled the homes of several celebrities over 2008 and 2009, stealing around $3 million in cash and belongings. Emma Watson, Taissa Farmiga, Leslie Mann, Israel Broussard, Katie Chang, and Claire Julien starred in the film, which premiered at the 2013 Cannes Film Festival, opening the Un Certain Regard section. It was inspired by a Vanity Fair feature on the real-life criminals depicted in the film, whom Coppola described as "products of our growing reality TV culture". The film received generally positive reviews, with many praising its style and performances. While some felt that the film glamorized the crimes in the story and failed to make an assertive message about them through the narrative; "Coppola neither makes a case for her characters nor places them inside of some kind of moral or critical framework; they simply pass through the frame, listing off name brands and staring at their phones".

The film was also criticized for whitewashing the character based on Diana Tamayo, a member of the Bling Ring who was of Colombian origin, as well as for significantly reducing or omitting her role in the narrative.

A Very Murray Christmas (2015)

Coppola collaborated again with her Lost in Translation star Bill Murray on A Very Murray Christmas, which stars Murray and was co-written by herself, Murray and Mitch Glazer. The film, an homage to classic Christmas-themed variety shows, was released in December 2015 on Netflix.

The Beguiled (2017)

Coppola directed The Beguiled (2017), a remake of the 1971 eponymous Southern Gothic film, starring Nicole Kidman, Elle Fanning, and Kirsten Dunst. The film premiered at the 2017 Cannes Film Festival, where Coppola became the second woman (and the first American woman) to win the Best Director award. The film is based on the 1966 book of the same name by author Thomas P. Cullinan about a wounded Union soldier in a Mississippi seminary during the American Civil War, and was made for under $10 million. The film exhibited elements of the thriller genre, another departure for Coppola.

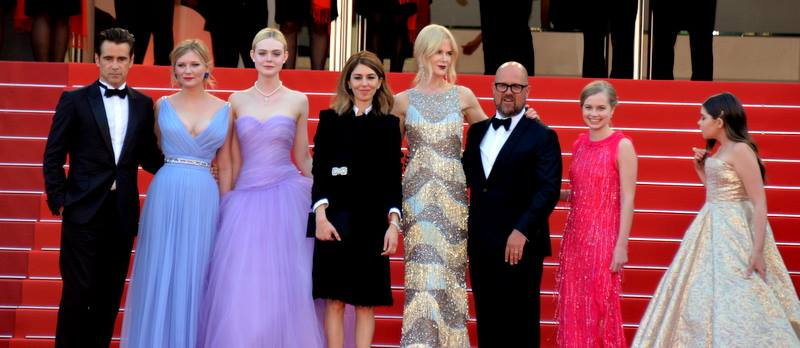
Colin Farrell, Kirsten Dunst, Elle Fanning, Coppola, and Nicole Kidman at the 2017 Cannes Film Festival

Coppola cited her intrigue with the South as part of the story's appeal. Coppola has said that she "wanted the film to represent an exaggerated version of all the ways women were traditionally raised there just to be lovely and cater to men—the manners of that whole world, and how they change when the men go away". Coppola has cited Gone with the Wind as her inspiration for creating a film that was relatable despite its position within a different era. The film faced a wave of controversy and division, including accusations of 'whitewashing' the original story after Coppola removed the supporting role of a black female slave from the film, as well as chose Kirsten Dunst to portray a character who was biracial in the original novel. Coppola also faced criticism for minimizing the story of the people experiencing actual hardship in favor of depicting, albeit authentically, the lavish lifestyle of her protagonists, thus minimizing the importance of a weighty topic. Coppola responded to these allegations by citing the presence of young girls among her movie-going audience. The Beguiled is not the only of Coppola's films to be accused of exposing the socio-cultural affordances of her own childhood.

Coppola described her version of the film as a reinterpretation, rather than a remake, of Don Siegel's 1971 adaption of the same book. Coppola wanted to tell the story of the male soldier entering into a classically southern and female environment from the point of view of the women and represent what that was like for them. Coppola thought that the earlier version made the characters out to be crazy caricatures and did not allow the viewer to know them. While some critics claim that Coppola intended The Beguiled as a feminist work, Coppola explained that she is not in favor of that labeling. Though she has said she is happy if others see the film in this way, she sees it as a film, rather, that possesses a female perspective—an important distinction. The Beguiled was also made as a contrast to The Bling Ring, and Coppola has explained that she needed to correct that film's harsh Los Angeles aesthetic with something more beautiful and poetic.

In 2024, during an interview with The New Yorker, Coppola stated “I admit it was probably stupid to do something on the Civil War.”

=== 2020–present ===
On the Rocks (2020)

Coppola's film, On the Rocks, tells the story of a daughter and father, played by Rashida Jones and Bill Murray respectively, as they explore New York together in an attempt to mend their fractured relationship. It was released in a limited theatrical release on October 2, 2020, by A24 and was released for digital streaming on October 23, 2020, by Apple TV+.

The film received positive reviews from critics, who praised Coppola's screenplay and direction, and noted it as lighter than her previous films. Some critics stated that the film "isn't destined to achieve the same kind of iconic status as some of Coppola's previous work".

Fairyland (2023)

An announcement in mid-December 2013 stated that American Zoetrope had successfully attained the screen rights for the memoir Fairyland: A Memoir of My Father and that Coppola would adapt the book with Andrew Durham. Coppola would also produce the film with her brother Roman. Coppola would later drop out of directing duties while remaining herself as a producer, as Durham took over as the sole director and writer for the film.

The film, titled Fairyland and starring Emilia Jones and Scoot McNairy, premiered at the 2023 Sundance Film Festival to positive reviews.

Priscilla (2023)

Coppola's next film, Priscilla (2023), her eighth as a director, is based on the life of Priscilla Presley and her 1985 memoir Elvis and Me. It stars Cailee Spaeny as Priscilla and Jacob Elordi as Elvis Presley. The film was distributed by A24 and premiered at the 80th Venice International Film Festival in September 2023.

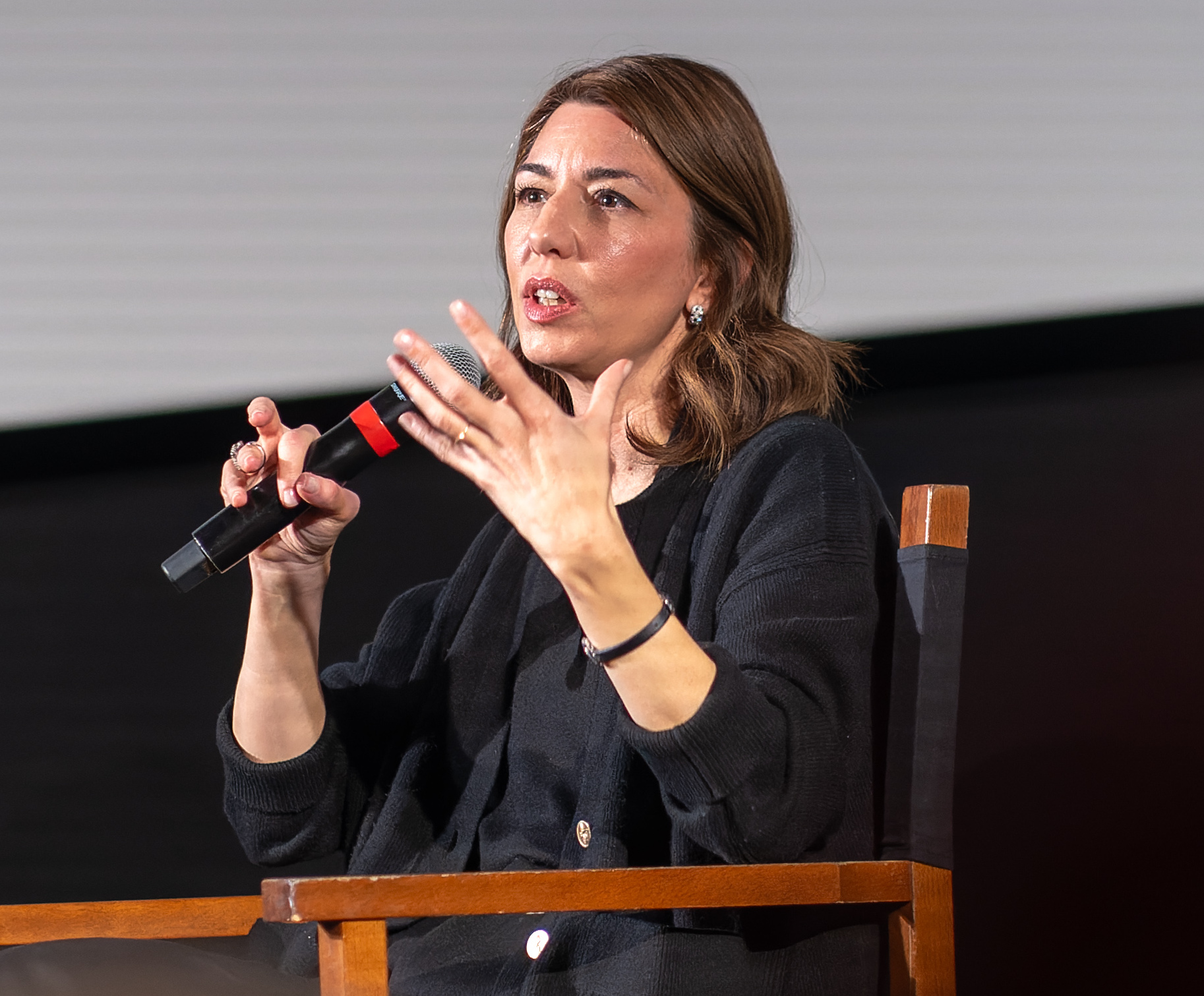
Coppola at a Q&A for Priscilla in 2023

It was based on Priscilla Presley's experience meeting Elvis and living in Graceland as described in her 1985 memoir. Unlike the film Elvis (2022) by Baz Luhrmann, the film does not portray Presley as positively or much of his successful career. Instead, it portrays his "darker, domestic side". Coppola was more interested in showing Priscilla's side of their relationship, highlighting the terror of Elvis' physical and emotional abuse towards Priscilla.

The film received positive reviews, with Rolling Stone declaring the film to be her best since Lost in Translation. David Rooney of The Hollywood Reporter wrote, "Coppola has always been a filmmaker who coaxes out feelings rather than blasts them with emphatic declarations, and the nuanced restraint of her writing and direction here are very much points in Priscilla's favor."

Coppola stated that she used her teenage years growing up in the Bay Area to inform her position in this role. She stated specifically about her time as a teenager, "I just remember everything being epic and important and with a lot of feeling and driving around and listening to music. Your senses are more heightened or something."

However, the film's portrayal of Elvis was criticized by Lisa Marie Presley, who informed Coppola in emails that her parts of her portrayal of Elvis did not even match what Priscilla initially claimed. However, according to Coppola, after seeing the final cut of the film, Priscilla said, "Cailee, really — that's how I felt."

Marc by Sofia (2025)

On September 2, 2025, Coppola's documentary about Marc Jacobs, Marc by Sofia, premiered at the 2025 Venice Film Festival.

In March 2026 Coppola revealed that she had worked on a period drama where Kirsten Dunst was scheduled to star as an undisclosed real-life figure but that this project was not moving forward.

== Other work ==
=== Television ===
In the mid-1990s, Coppola and her best friend Zoe Cassavetes helmed the short-lived Comedy Central series Hi Octane, which spotlit performers in underground music. The show was cancelled after four episodes.

In December 2008, Coppola's first commercial premiered during an episode of Gossip Girl. The advertisement she directed for the Christian Dior fragrance Miss Dior Chérie, shot in France with model Maryna Linchuk, was very well received and continues to be popular on YouTube.

In October 2014, Coppola launched a series of Christmas ads for the clothing chain Gap.

In May 2020, it was announced Coppola would write and direct an adaptation of The Custom of the Country by Edith Wharton for Apple TV+.

In 2022, Coppola guest-starred as herself, alongside her husband Thomas Mars and fellow director Jim Jarmusch, in an episode of the FX horror comedy series What We Do in the Shadows.

=== Art and photography ===
Coppola sits on the board for Gagosian Gallery. The July 2013 issue of Elle featured photographs shot by Coppola of Paris Hilton at Hilton's Beverly Hills mansion (Both model and house appear in The Bling Ring).

=== Books ===
- Coppola, Sofia (2023). Sofia Coppola Archive: 1999–2023. London: Mack. ISBN 978-1-915743-13-8. OCLC 1396453281.

Released on November 1, 2023, Archive by Sofia Coppola is a personal collection with behind the scene content, scripts, photographs, and development behind each of her films, including content from all of her films The Virgin Suicides (1999), Lost in Translation (2003), Marie Antoinette (2006), Somewhere (2010), The Beguiled (2017), and Priscilla (2023). The book has a total of 488 pages. Archive is personally edited and annotated by Coppola herself. In 2025, Coppola released a Virgin Suicides photo book featuring behind-the-scenes images captured on set by Corinne Day and started her own imprint under Mack Books. She also released Chanel Haute Couture, an intimate look into the Chanel Atelier.

=== Journalism ===
Coppola serves as contributing editor at WYouth, proposing the idea of the magazine to Ava Nirui in 2025.

=== Modeling ===
At the beginning of the 1990s, Coppola was often featured in girl-oriented magazines like Seventeen and YM. In 1994, she co-founded the clothing line Milk Fed in Japan, with her friend Stephanie Hayman in cooperation with Sonic Youth's Kim Gordon. In 2001, the fashion designer Marc Jacobs chose the actress/director to be the "face" of his house's fragrance, Daisy. The campaign photographs of Coppola were shot by photographer Jürgen Teller.

=== Retail ===
In 2024, Coppola released a line of lip balms in collaboration with skin care brand Augustinus Bader.

=== Stage direction ===
In 2017, before Coppola started pre-production on The Beguiled, she was asked by Italian state broadcaster Rai Com from All'Opera to direct their latest production of La traviata. La traviata is a three act opera by Giuseppe Verdi set to an Italian libretto by Francesca Maria Piave. This Coppola-directed production was filmed for broadcast in Germany and France by Arte/ZDF, using multiple state-of-the art 4k cameras and up to 100 microphones. Coppola said in an interview she "could not turn down the project" with designer and fashion icon Valentino Garavani designing the costumes for this 15 show run of La traviata. Discussing her modern take on this classic story Coppola says "I wanted to bring out the personal side of the French courtesan, the party girl used to the social scene. It's a very feminine world that I love".

This was the first stage production Coppola directed. Coppola discusses how Valentino "really motivated me to take a chance and do something that was scary for me and very unfamiliar," and promised a "traditional" production that could nevertheless be appreciated by those who are not opera connoisseurs. Rome Opera House Director Carlo Fuortes said in an interview ticket sales had exceeded 1.2 million euros (1.35 million dollars), a record for the establishment.

All fifteen shows nearly sold out before opening night. It was the biggest box office success since the Teatro dell'Opera Di Roma opened in 1880.

== Criticisms ==
Although her films have won critical acclaim, they have also faced ongoing criticism over the years for alleged racism, whitewashing, and centering of whiteness.

== Personal life ==
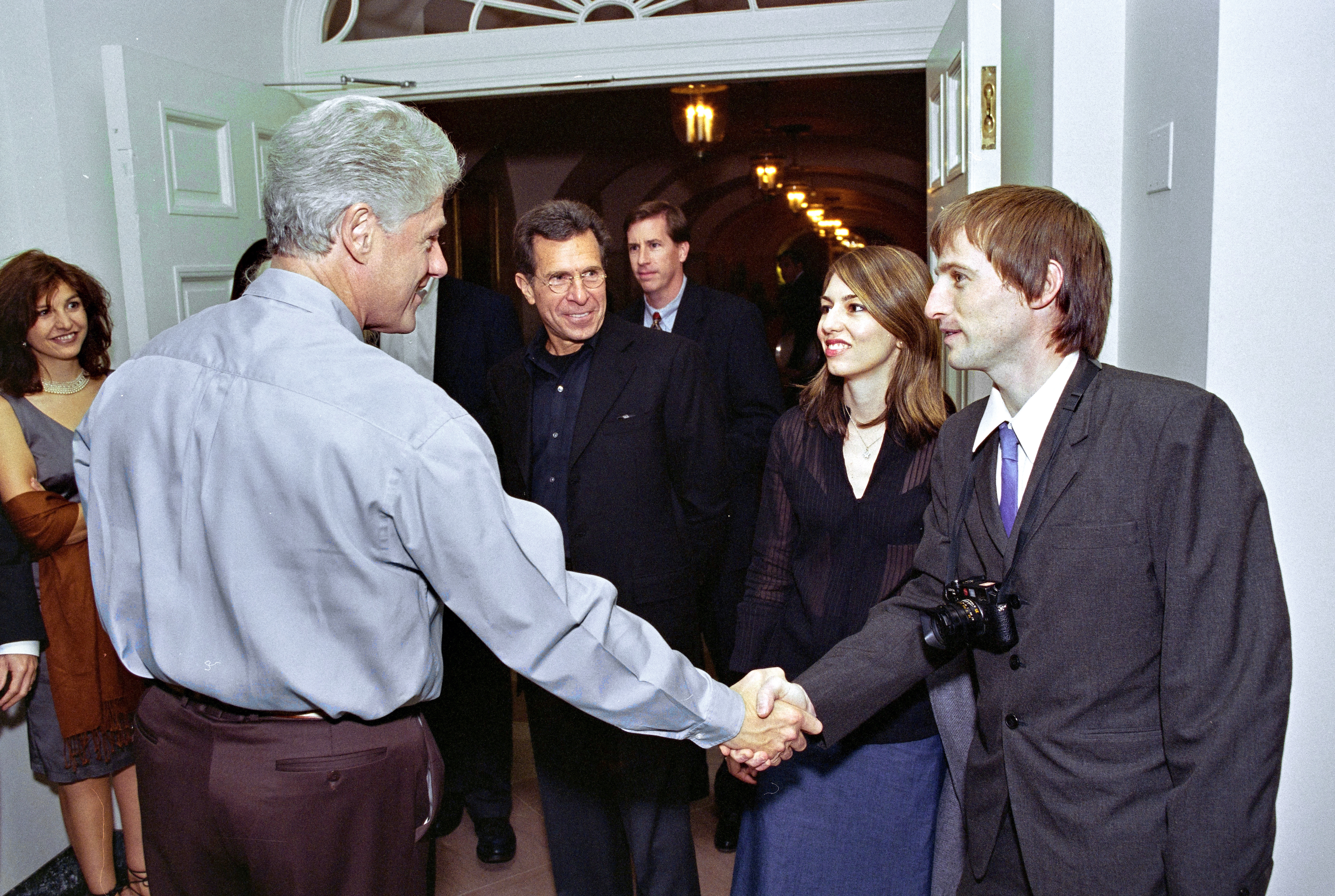
President Bill Clinton greets Coppola and then-husband Spike Jonze at Three Kings screening on October 14, 1999.

Coppola dated Steven Shane McDonald of the power-pop band Redd Kross in the early 1990s, and appeared nude wearing a mask on the cover of the 1990 Redd Kross album Third Eye.

In 1992, Coppola met director Spike Jonze; they married in 1999 and divorced in 2003. In an official statement, Coppola's publicist explained that the divorce decision was reached "with sadness". It is widely believed that the main character's husband in Lost in Translation is based on Jonze, as Coppola stated after the film's release, "There are elements of Spike there, elements of experiences."

From 2003 to 2005 Coppola dated filmmaker Quentin Tarantino. They have remained friends since their separation.

Coppola married musician Thomas Mars on August 27, 2011, at Palazzo Margherita in Bernalda, Italy. They met while producing the soundtrack to The Virgin Suicides. They have two daughters: Romy (born November 28, 2006), whose name is an homage to Coppola's brother Roman, and Cosima (born May 18, 2010).

Coppola and her family lived in Paris for several years before moving to New York City in 2010.

Coppola has maintained a low public profile for her family, aiming for her daughters' lives to be unaffected by her career and travel. When asked if her choices as a parent to keep her children out of the spotlight is a result of her own upbringing, Coppola has explained that she does not want her children to be jaded.

== Filmography ==
Film

Year	Title	Director	Writer	Producer	Notes
1989	New York Stories	No	Yes	No	Segment: "Life Without Zoë"
1998	Lick the Star	Yes	Yes	Yes	Short film
1999	The Virgin Suicides	Yes	Yes	No	
2003	Lost in Translation	Yes	Yes	Yes	
2006	Marie Antoinette	Yes	Yes	Yes	
2010	Somewhere	Yes	Yes	Yes	
2013	The Bling Ring	Yes	Yes	Yes	
2017	The Beguiled	Yes	Yes	Yes	
2020	On the Rocks	Yes	Yes	Yes	
2023	Fairyland	No	No	Yes	
2023	Priscilla	Yes	Yes	Yes	
2025	Marc by Sofia	Yes	No	Yes	Documentary
2026	Making Marie Antoinette	No	No	Yes	Documentary

Television

Year	Title	Director	Writer	Executive producer	Notes
2015	A Very Murray Christmas	Yes	Yes	Yes	Television special

Stage

Year	Title	Notes
2017	La Traviata	Opera in Rome Teatro dell'Opera di Roma

Music videos

- "Shine" by Walt Mink (1993)
- "This Here Giraffe" by The Flaming Lips (1996)
- "Elektrobank" by The Chemical Brothers (1997)
- "Playground Love" by Air (2000)
- "City Girl" by Kevin Shields (2003)
- "I Just Don't Know What to Do with Myself" by The White Stripes (2003)
- "Chloroform" by Phoenix (2013)
- "A-Lister" by Romy Mars (2025)

Advertisements

- Miss Dior Chérie fragrance for Christian Dior starring Maryna Linchuk (2008)
- City of Light fragrance for Christian Dior starring Natalie Portman (2012)
- Marni collection for H&M starring Imogen Poots (2012)
- La vie en rose for Christian Dior fragrance Miss Dior starring Natalie Portman (2013)
- Daisy fragrance for Marc Jacobs starring Ondria Hardin, Malaika Firth, Antonia Wesseloh, and Sophia Ahrens (2013)
- Dress Normal for Gap (2014)
- Calvin Klein Underwear Women's Spring (2017)
- Panthère de Cartier for Cartier (jeweler) (2017)
- New York City Ballet for the 2021 Spring Gala (2021)
- Suntory Time 100th anniversary tribute for Suntory featuring Keanu Reeves (2023)
- Barrie + Sofia Coppola capsule collection for Barrie featuring Margaret Qualley (2023)
- Come Alive with the Seasons for Suntory featuring Elle Fanning (2025)
- Love Unlimited for Cartier (jeweler) featuring Jacob Elordi (2025)

=== Acting roles ===
Film

Year	Title	Role	Director	Notes
1972	The Godfather	Michael Francis Rizzi (Infant)	Francis Ford Coppola	Uncredited
1974	The Godfather Part II	Child on Ship	Francis Ford Coppola	Uncredited
1983	The Outsiders	Little Girl	Francis Ford Coppola	Credited as Domino
1983	Rumble Fish	Donna	Francis Ford Coppola	Credited as Domino
1984	Frankenweenie	Anne Chambers	Tim Burton	Credited as Domino
1984	The Cotton Club	Child in Street	Francis Ford Coppola	Credited as Domino
1986	Peggy Sue Got Married	Nancy Kelcher	Francis Ford Coppola	
1987	Anna	Noodle	Yurek Bogayevicz	
1988	Tucker: The Man and His Dream	Girl at Mellon Publicity Event	Francis Ford Coppola	Uncredited
1990	The Godfather Part III	Mary Corleone	Francis Ford Coppola	
1990	The Spirit of '76	Girl in Parade	Lucas Reiner	Uncredited
1992	Inside Monkey Zetterland	Cindy	Jefery Levy	
1999	Star Wars: Episode I – The Phantom Menace	Saché	George Lucas	
2002	CQ	Enzo's Mistress	Roman Coppola	

Television

Year	Title	Role	Notes
1986–1987	Faerie Tale Theatre	Child / Gwendolyn	2 episodes
2022	What We Do in the Shadows	Herself	Episode: "Freddie"

Music videos

- "Mildred Pierce" by Sonic Youth (1990) – directed by Dave Markey
- "Deeper and Deeper" by Madonna (1992) – directed by Bobby Woods
- "Sometimes Salvation" by The Black Crowes (1992) – directed by Stéphane Sednaoui
- "Elektrobank" by The Chemical Brothers (1997) – directed by Spike Jonze
- "Funky Squaredance" by Phoenix (2002) – directed by Roman Coppola

== Awards and nominations ==
Coppola was nominated for three Academy Awards for her film Lost in Translation (2003), in the categories of Best Picture, Best Director, and Best Original Screenplay. She went on to win Best Original Screenplay, losing the other two nominations to Peter Jackson's The Lord of the Rings: The Return of the King. Coppola's nomination for Best Director made her the first American woman to be nominated in that category, and the third woman overall, after Lina Wertmüller and Jane Campion. In 2010, Kathryn Bigelow became the fourth woman to be nominated, and the first to win the award. Coppola, however, remains the youngest woman to be nominated in the category. Her win for Best Original Screenplay (along with her cousin Nicolas Cage's 1996 win for Best Actor) resulted in her family becoming the second three-generation Oscar-winning family, with her grandfather Carmine Coppola and her father Francis Ford Coppola having previously won Oscars as well. The first family to achieve this feat was the Huston family, for wins by Walter, John, and Anjelica. For her work on Lost in Translation, Coppola also won the Golden Globe Awards for Best Motion Picture and Best Screenplay, in addition to receiving three Independent Spirit Awards and three BAFTA Award nominations.

On September 11, 2010, Coppola's film Somewhere won the Golden Lion, the top prize at the Venice International Film Festival. Coppola became the first American woman and the fourth American filmmaker to win the award.

In 2016, Coppola's musical comedy special A Very Murray Christmas earned her a nomination for the Primetime Emmy Award for Outstanding Television Movie.

On May 28, 2017, Coppola was awarded the Best Director Award at the Cannes Film Festival for her film The Beguiled, making her the second woman and the first American woman to win the award.

Awards and nominations received by Coppola's films
Year	Title	Academy Awards		BAFTA Awards		Golden Globe Awards		Cannes/Venice Film Festival	
Year	Title	Nominations	Wins	Nominations	Wins	Nominations	Wins	Nominations	Wins
1999	The Virgin Suicides							2	
2003	Lost in Translation	4	1	8	3	5	3	2	2
2006	Marie Antoinette	1	1	3				2	1
2010	Somewhere							1	1
2013	The Bling Ring							1	
2017	The Beguiled							2	1
2020	On the Rocks					1			
2023	Priscilla					1		2	1
Total		5	2	11	3	6	3	12	6

== See also ==
- Coppola family tree
- List of Academy Award–winning families

== Notes ==
Awards and achievements
Preceded by Alexander Payne for About Schmidt	Golden Globe Award for Best Screenplay for Lost in Translation; 2004	Succeeded by Alexander Payne, Jim Taylor for Sideways
Preceded by Clint Eastwood for Mystic River	César Award for Best Foreign Film for Lost in Translation; 2005	Succeeded by Clint Eastwood for Million Dollar Baby
