= The Beguiled (1971 film) =

1971 film by Don Siegel

- Theatrical release poster by Bob Peak
- Directed by: Don Siegel
- Screenplay by: Albert Maltz (as John B. Sherry); Irene Kamp (as Grimes Grice)
- Based on: The Beguiled (1966 novel) by Thomas P. Cullinan
- Produced by: Don Siegel
- Starring: Clint Eastwood; Geraldine Page; Elizabeth Hartman
- Cinematography: Bruce Surtees
- Edited by: Carl Pingitore
- Music by: Lalo Schifrin
- Production company: The Malpaso Company
- Distributed by: Universal Pictures
- Release date: May 28, 1971
- Running time: 105 minutes
- Country: United States
- Language: English
- Box office: $1.1 million

The Beguiled is a 1971 American Southern Gothic psychological thriller film directed and produced by Don Siegel, and starring Clint Eastwood, Geraldine Page and Elizabeth Hartman. Based on Thomas P. Cullinan's 1966 novel, the film is set during the Civil War and follows a wounded Union soldier (Eastwood) who is reluctantly taken into care at a girls' school in Confederate territory.

The film marks the third of five collaborations between Siegel and Eastwood, following Coogan's Bluff (1968) and Two Mules for Sister Sara (1970), and continuing with Dirty Harry (1971) and Escape from Alcatraz (1979).

The Beguiled was released by Universal Pictures on May 28, 1971. Initial critical reception was polarized and the film was a commercial disappointment, but retrospective reviews have been much more positive. Quentin Tarantino called it "the closest Siegel ever came to making an art film."

== Plot ==
During the American Civil War in 1863, Amy, a 12-year-old student at the Miss Martha Farnsworth Seminary for Young Ladies in rural Mississippi, discovers a seriously wounded Union soldier, John McBurney. She brings him to the school's gated enclosure where the school headmistress, Martha Farnsworth, first insists on turning him over to Confederate troops, but then decides to restore him to health first. He is initially kept locked in the school's music room and kept under watch. Edwina, the 22-year-old schoolteacher who has had no experience with men, takes an immediate liking to John, as does Carol, a 17-year-old student who makes advances with an experienced air.

John begins to bond with each of the women in the house, including the slave Hallie. As he charms each of them, the sexually repressed atmosphere of the school becomes filled with jealousy and deceit, and the women begin to turn on one another. After Carol, who earlier made a welcomed pass at John, witnesses John kissing Edwina in the garden, she ties a blue rag to the school's entrance gate to alert the Confederate troops to the presence of a Yankee soldier. When a band of Confederate soldiers see it while passing the school, Martha lies and helps John pretend he is a relative loyal to the Confederacy.

Martha also becomes infatuated with John, and a flashback shows her having an incestuous relationship with her brother. Martha considers keeping John at the school as a handyman. She makes sexual advances toward him, which he resists.

Late one night, Edwina discovers John having sex with Carol in her bedroom. In a jealous rage, she beats him with a candlestick, causing him to fall down the staircase and break his leg severely. Martha insists he will die of gangrene unless they amputate his leg. The women carry him to the kitchen where they tie him to the table. Martha saws off his leg at the knee. When John awakens and learns that his leg has been amputated, he goes into a fury, convinced that Martha performed the operation as revenge for his rejection of her sexual advances.

John, again under lock and key, convinces Carol to unlock his door. He sneaks from his room into Martha's and steals a pistol and some personal items of Martha's including some letters from her brother. Convinced that Martha plans to hold him prisoner, John confronts Martha at gunpoint, claiming control of the house and declaring his intention to have his way with any of the women or girls. He gets drunk and then confronts the entire household, revealing that he read Martha's letters and that they implicate Martha and her brother in an incestuous relationship. In a fit of anger he also accidentally kills Amy's pet turtle, which he immediately regrets and apologizes for, to no avail, as Amy professes her hatred of him. Edwina follows John to his room and professes her love for him. They begin to kiss and it is later implied that they had sex.

Meanwhile, Martha convinces the others (except for Edwina, who is not present) that they need to kill John to prevent him from denouncing them to Union troops who have made camp within sight of the school. Martha asks Amy to pick mushrooms they can prepare "especially for him" and Amy says she knows just where to find some. At dinner, John apologizes for his actions, and Edwina reveals that she and John have made plans to leave the school and marry. John eats the mushrooms and the others pass the bowl without taking any except for Edwina. When she starts to eat some, Martha cries out for her to stop. John realizes he has been poisoned, leaves the dining room disoriented, and collapses in the hallway. The following day, the women sew his corpse into a burial shroud and carry him out of the gate to bury. They agree he died of exhaustion, and Amy denies she could ever pick a poisonous mushroom by mistake.

== Cast ==
Credits from the AFI Catalog of Feature Films:

- Clint Eastwood as Corporal John 'McBee' McBurney
- Geraldine Page as Martha Farnsworth
- Elizabeth Hartman as Edwina Dabney
- Jo Ann Harris as Carol
- Darleen Carr as Doris
- Mae Mercer as Hallie
- Pamelyn Ferdin as Amelia 'Amy'
- Melody Thomas as Abigail
- Peggy Drier as Lizzie
- Pattye Mattick as Janie
- Charlie Briggs as Confederate Army Captain
- George Dunn as Jepson
- Patrick Culliton as Miles
- Buddy Van Horn as Bunderman
- Bill Lee as Singer
- Matt Clark as Soldier

== Production ==
Clint Eastwood was given a copy of the 1966 novel by producer Jennings Lang, and was engrossed throughout the night in reading it. This was the first of several films where Eastwood agreed to storylines where nubile females look at him adoringly (including minors in this film and Pale Rider). Eastwood considered the film as "an opportunity to play true emotions and not totally operatic and not lighting cannons with cigars". Albert Maltz was brought in to draft the script, but disagreements in the end led to a revision of the script by Claude Traverse, who although uncredited, led to Maltz being credited under a pseudonym. Maltz had originally written a script with a happy ending, in which Eastwood's character and the girl live happily ever after. Both Eastwood and director Don Siegel felt that an ending faithful to that of the book would be a stronger anti-war statement, and Eastwood's character would be killed. The film, according to Siegel, deals with the themes of sex, violence and vengeance, and was based around "the basic desire of women to castrate men" though the central theme was the impact of a man having sex with multiple women.

Jeanne Moreau was considered for the role of the domineering Martha Farnsworth, but the role went to Geraldine Page, and actresses Elizabeth Hartman, Jo Ann Harris, Darlene Carr, Mae Mercer, and Pamelyn Ferdin were cast in supporting roles.

Universal initially wanted Siegel to film at a studio at Disney Studios Ranch, but Siegel preferred to have it filmed at an antebellum estate near Baton Rouge, Louisiana in Ascension Parish: the Ashland-Belle Helene Plantation, a historic house built in 1841, that was a plantation estate and home of Duncan Farrar Kenner. Portions of the interiors were filmed at Universal Studios. Filming started in April 1970 and lasted 10 weeks.

Eastwood had signed a long-term contract with Universal but became angry with the studio because he felt that they botched its release. This eventually led to his leaving the studio in 1975 after the release of The Eiger Sanction, which he directed as well as starred in. He would not work with Universal again until 2008's Changeling.

Eastwood said of his role in The Beguiled,

Dustin Hoffman and Al Pacino play losers very well. But my audience like to be in there vicariously with a winner. That isn't always popular with critics. My characters have sensitivity and vulnerabilities, but they're still winners. I don't pretend to understand losers. When I read a script about a loser, I think of people in life who are losers, and they seem to want it that way. It's a compulsive philosophy with them. Winners tell themselves I'm as bright as the next person. I can do it. Nothing can stop me.

== Reception ==
“The subjects to which Siegel is drawn, the manner in which they are filmed, [among these] The Beguiled...are informed and illuminated by his sensibility. It takes great courage to display one’s innermost thoughts on film without flinching. Siegel will dare anything filmically; his movies transcend the impersonality of other, equally talented directors.”—Biographer Judith M. Kass in Don Siegel: The Hollywood Professionals, Volume 4 (1975).

Vincent Canby of The New York Times wrote that the film "is not, indeed, successful as baroque melodrama, and, towards the end, there are so many twists and turns of plot and character that everything that's gone before is neutralized. People who consider themselves discriminating moviegoers, but who are uncommitted to Mr. Siegel will be hard put to accept it, other than as a sensational, misogynistic nightmare." A negative review in Variety said that the film "doesn't come off, and the apparent attempt to mesh Charles Addams style with Tennessee Williams-type material cues audience laughter in all the wrong places." Gene Siskel of the Chicago Tribune gave the film two stars out of four and wrote that Siegel "unfortunately elects to tell his story with a broad and leering humor that at times is barely distinguishable from a sexploitation shocker." Kevin Thomas of the Los Angeles Times praised The Beguiled as "a film of psychological suspense laced with dark humor that is a triumph of style, totally engrossing and utterly convincing." Gary Arnold of The Washington Post slammed the film as "anything but beguiling. Weird, yes; trashy, yes; pathetic, yes; beguiling, no." Nigel Andrews of The Monthly Film Bulletin called it "a film that works best when it is most outrageous. Geraldine Page's piously neurotic Miss Martha and Elizabeth Hartman's sickly Edwina hover on the brink of self-parody for most of the film, and are pushed well over in Siegel's climactic dream sequence, which begins with multiple-exposure effects and triangular embraces and ends with a shot of the two women supporting a limply naked Eastwood in the pose of Van Der Weyden's 'Pieta' (which hangs ambiguously on Page's bedroom wall)."

The film received major recognition in France, and was proposed by Pierre Rissient to the Cannes Film Festival, and while agreed to by Eastwood and Siegel, the producers declined. It would be widely screened in France later and is considered one of Eastwood's finest works by the French. The film was poorly marketed and in the end grossed little over $1 million, earning less than a fourth of what Sweet Sweetback's Baadasssss Song did at the same time and falling to below 50 in the charts within two weeks of release.

Made right before Dirty Harry, this was a bold early attempt by Eastwood to play against type. It was not a hit, likely due to uncertainty on Universal's part concerning how to market it, eventually leading them to advertise the film as a hothouse melodrama: "One man...seven women...in a strange house!" "His love... or his life..." According to Eastwood and Jennings Lang, the film, aside from being poorly publicized, flopped due to Eastwood's being "emasculated in the film". The film's poster, for example, shows him with a gun, suggesting an action movie, but the only action consists of a few seconds of flashback to Eastwood's character in battle before being wounded.

Quentin Tarantino later wrote the movie "was the closest Siegel ever came to making an art film... and truth be told, as good as it is, as its director, he's miscast. While the offbeat film is ultimately successful, it does bring out Siegel's worst stylistic impulses. His fondness for Freudian imagery, his literalness in a tale that screams for ambiguity (a dream sequence in the middle makes explicit everything that had only been suggested). However, once Siegel settles down and focuses on Eastwood, the film comes alive."

The Beguiled holds a 90% approval rating on review aggregator website Rotten Tomatoes, based on 21 reviews, with a weighted average of 7.3/10. Metacritic assigned the film a weighted average score of 66 out of 100, based on 6 critics, indicating "generally favourable reviews".

== Theme ==
“Women are capable of deceit, larceny, murder, anything. Behind that mask of innocence lurks just as much evil as you’ll find in members of the Mafia. Any young girl, who looks perfectly harmless, is capable of murder.” — Filmmaker Don Siegel from an interview with Stuart M. Kaminsky in Take One (Canadian film journal), June, 1972

Even when faced with Siegel's contentious statement about women, film critic Judith M. Kass probes deeper to uncover elements of feminism within 'The Beguiled', presenting an alternate perspective:

These “ladies” may be more like men in every way than either men or women would like to acknowledge. They are sexually aggressive and are depicted as being able to run their lives, fend off intruders, farm their own land, educate them selves—to do themselves those things for which women have traditionally turned to men. These females have inverted their world; while they acknowledge the need for men, they are self-sufficient.

Kass continues: “The women in The Beguiled are not all bad; they are hard-pressed, unused to the lives they are leading, victimized by events they had not had in shaping, sexually thwarted at the stages in their development when they should be freest. They can trust no friend, let alone foe: the Confederates who offer to guard them obviously have rape in mind and the Yankee in their midst acts like the master of a private seraglio. Why shouldn’t they become desperate, say and do things that wouldn't under ordinary circumstances?”

== Other film adaptations ==
Sofia Coppola wrote and directed a film based on the same source material with Nicole Kidman, Colin Farrell, Kirsten Dunst and Elle Fanning. It had its world premiere at the Cannes Film Festival in May 2017. The film was released by Focus Features on June 23, 2017.

== See also ==
- List of American films of 1971

== Bibliography ==
- Hirsch, Foster (1971–72). "The Beguilded: Southern Gothic revived." Film Heritage, 7, 15–20.
- Kass, Judith M. (1975). Don Siegel: The Hollywood Professionals, Volume 4 (1975 ed.). New York: Tanvity Press. p. 207. ISBN 0-498-01665-X.
- Kay, Karyn. (1976) "The Beguiled: Gothic Misogyny." Velvet Light Trap, 16, 32–33.
- Hughes, Howard (2009). Aim for the Heart. London: I.B. Tauris. ISBN 978-1-84511-902-7.
- McGilligan, Patrick (1999). Clint: The Life and Legend. London: HarperCollins. ISBN 978-0-00-638354-3.
