= The Chemical Brothers discography =

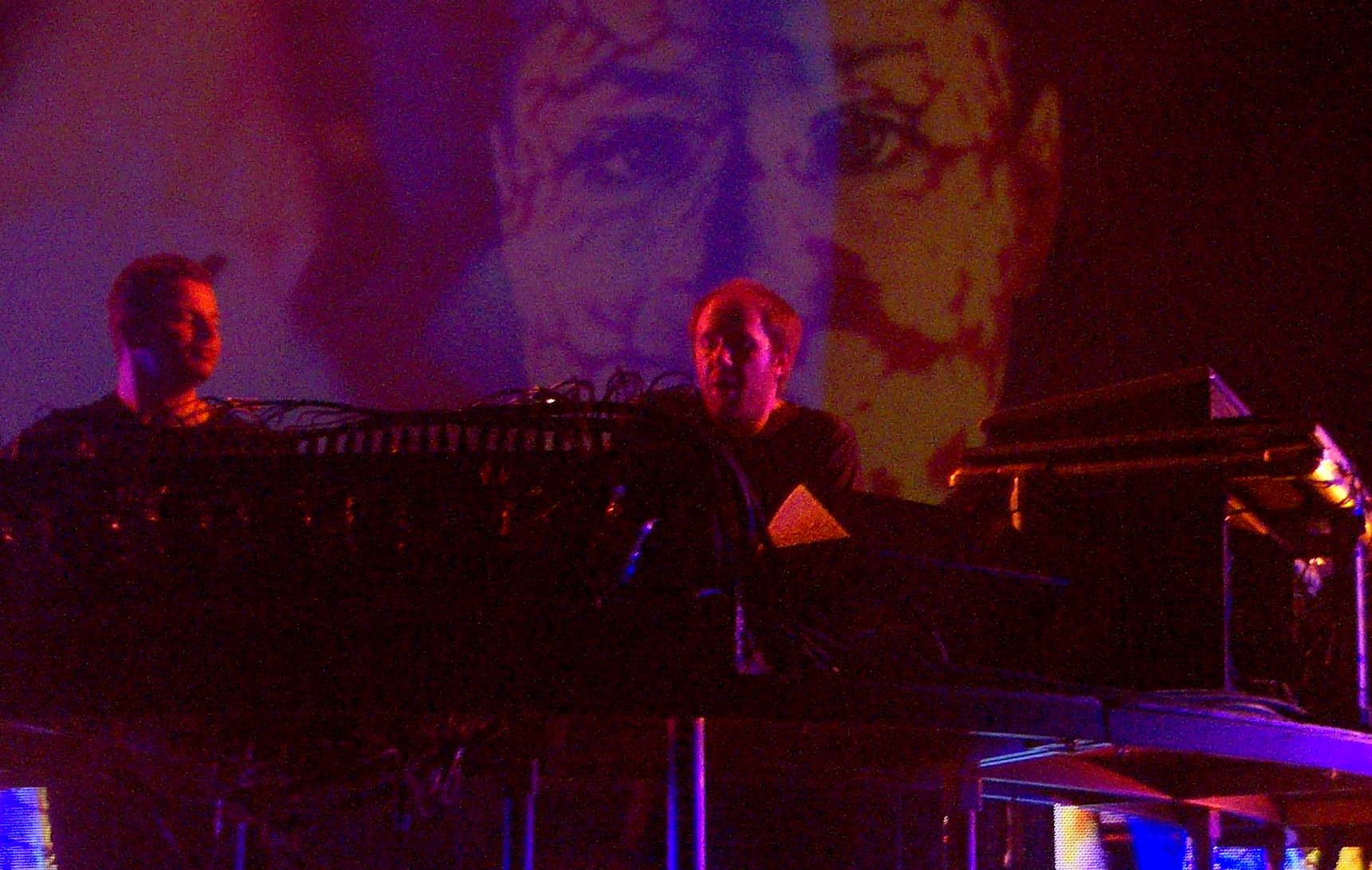
- The Chemical Brothers performing live: Ed Simons (left) and Tom Rowlands (right)
- Studio albums: 10
- Extended plays: 6
- Soundtrack albums: 1
- Live albums: 1
- Compilation albums: 4
- Singles: 37
- Video albums: 2
- Music videos: 35
- Remix albums: 2
- Mix albums: 5
- Promotional singles: 15

British big beat duo the Chemical Brothers have released ten studio albums, one live album, five compilation albums, two remix albums, five mix albums, one soundtrack album, two video albums, six extended plays, thirty-seven singles, fifteen promotional singles and thirty-two music videos.

== Albums ==
=== Studio albums ===
List of studio albums, with selected chart positions and certifications
Title	Album details	Peak chart positions										Sales	Certifications
Title	Album details	UK	AUS	AUT	BEL	FRA	IRL	NLD	NZ	SWI	US	Sales	Certifications
Exit Planet Dust	Released: 26 June 1995; Label: Junior Boy's Own; Formats: CD, CS, LP	9	—	—	49	—	—	77	42	—	—	UK: 314,000; US: 750,000; WW: 1,000,000	BPI: Platinum; ARIA: Gold
Dig Your Own Hole	Released: 7 April 1997; Label: Virgin, Freestyle Dust; Formats: CD, CS, LP	1	3	26	7	24	—	23	2	30	14	UK: 308,000; US: 756,000; Europe: 775,000; WW: 2,000,000	BPI: Platinum; ARIA: Platinum; RIAA: Gold
Surrender	Released: 21 June 1999; Label: Virgin, Freestyle Dust; Formats: CD, CS, LP	1	5	16	6	8	43	14	7	17	32	US: 402,000; WW: 2,300,000	BPI: 2× Platinum; ARIA: 2× Platinum; RMNZ: 2× Platinum
Come with Us	Released: 28 January 2002; Label: Virgin, Freestyle Dust; Formats: CD, CS, LP	1	1	16	5	4	1	30	1	12	32	UK: 217,000; US: 30,000	BPI: Gold; ARIA: Gold; RMNZ: Gold
Push the Button	Released: 24 January 2005; Label: Virgin, Freestyle Dust; Formats: CD, LP, download	1	5	18	1	17	3	7	8	8	59		BPI: Platinum; ARIA: Gold; IRMA: Platinum
We Are the Night	Released: 2 July 2007; Label: Virgin, Freestyle Dust; Formats: CD, LP, download	1	18	18	3	28	4	17	19	6	65		BPI: Gold; IRMA: Gold
Further	Released: 7 June 2010; Label: Virgin, Freestyle Dust; Formats: CD, LP, download	—^{[A]}	9	48	10	34	19	42	19	5	63	US: 40,000	
Born in the Echoes	Released: 17 July 2015; Label: Virgin EMI; Formats: CD, LP, download	1	5	10	2	29	4	4	10	2	73	US: 7,000	BPI: Silver
No Geography	Released: 12 April 2019; Label: Virgin EMI; Formats: CD, LP, download	4	17	26	9	48	21	26	—	10	—	US: 8,000	
For That Beautiful Feeling	Released: 8 September 2023; Label: EMI; Formats: CD, CS, LP, download	6	70	—	65	64	85	—	—	—	—		
"—" denotes a recording that did not chart or was not released in that territory.

=== Compilation albums ===
List of compilation albums, with selected chart positions and certifications
Title	Album details	Peak chart positions										Certifications
Title	Album details	UK	AUS	AUT	BEL	FRA	ITA	NZ	SWI	US	US Dance	Certifications
Singles 93–03	Released: 22 September 2003; Label: Virgin, Freestyle Dust; Formats: CD, CS, LP	9	44	—	16	—	12	12	—	123	2	BPI: Gold; ARIA: Gold
B-Sides Volume 1	Released: 26 November 2007; Label: Virgin, Freestyle Dust; Formats: Download	—	—	—	—	—	—	—	—	—	—	
Brotherhood	Released: 1 September 2008; Label: Virgin, Freestyle Dust; Formats: CD, LP, download	11	94	63	15	94	13	—	35	—	14	BPI: Gold; ARIA: Gold
"—" denotes a recording that did not chart or was not released in that territory.

=== Remix albums ===
List of remix albums
Title	Album details
The Remixes Volume 06	Released: 20 September 2005; Label: Disky Dance; Formats: CD
Remixes	Released: 2008; Label: Harmless; Formats: CD

=== Mix albums ===
List of mix albums, with selected chart positions
Title	Album details	Peak chart positions			
Title	Album details	UK Comp.	AUS	NOR	US
Live at the Social Volume 1	Released: May 1996; Label: Heavenly; Formats: CD, CS	19	—	—	—
Radio 1 Anti-Nazi Mix	Released: 1997; Label: Virgin, Freestyle Dust; Formats: CD	—	—	—	—
Brothers Gonna Work It Out	Released: 22 September 1998; Label: Virgin, Freestyle Dust; Formats: CD, CS	7	86	24	95
In Glint	Released: 2002; Label: Freestyle Dust; Formats: CD	—	—	—	—
Confront Your Demons	Released: 2003; Label: Virgin, Cornerstone; Formats: CD, DVD-A	—	—	—	—
"—" denotes a recording that did not chart or was not released in that territory.

=== Soundtrack albums ===
List of soundtrack albums, with selected chart positions
Title	Album details	Peak chart positions	Sales
Title	Album details	US Dance	Sales
Hanna	Released: 15 March 2011; Label: Back Lot; Formats: CD, LP, download	7	US: 29,000

=== Video albums ===
List of video albums, with selected chart positions
Title	Album details	Peak chart positions				
Title	Album details	BEL	FRA	ITA	NLD	SPA
Singles 93–03	Released: 22 September 2003; Label: Virgin, Freestyle Dust; Formats: DVD	—	—	—	—	—
Don't Think	Released: 26 March 2012; Label: Parlophone; Formats: Blu-ray	63	194	58	89	63
"—" denotes a recording that did not chart or was not released in that territory.

== Extended plays ==
List of extended plays, with selected chart positions
Title	Details	Peak chart positions				
Title	Details	UK	IRL	NZ	SWE	US Dance
Fourteenth Century Sky	Released: Early 1994; Label: Junior Boy's Own; Formats: 12"	—	—	—	—	—
My Mercury Mouth E.P	Released: Late 1994; Label: Junior Boy's Own; Formats: 12"	89	—	—	—	—
Loops of Fury	Released: 15 January 1996; Label: Freestyle Dust; Formats: CD, 12"	13	20	48	20	—
Music:Response	Released: 6 March 2000; Label: Virgin, Freestyle Dust; Formats: CD, 12"	—	—	—	—	—
Come with Us/Japan Only EP	Released: 17 July 2002; Label: Virgin, Freestyle Dust; Formats: CD	—	—	—	—	—
AmericanEP	Released: 12 November 2002; Label: Virgin, Freestyle Dust; Formats: CD	—	—	—	—	25
Live 05	Released: 29 November 2005; Label: Virgin, Freestyle Dust; Formats: Download	—	—	—	—	—
"—" denotes a recording that did not chart or was not released in that territory.

== Singles ==
List of singles, with selected chart positions and certifications, showing year released and album name
Title	Year	Peak chart positions										Certifications	Album
Title	Year	UK	AUS	BEL	FRA	IRL	NLD	NZ	SWI	US	US Dance	Certifications	Album
"Leave Home"	1995	17	—	—	—	—	—	—	—	—	—		Exit Planet Dust
"Life Is Sweet"	1995	25	—	—	—	—	—	—	—	—	31		Exit Planet Dust
"Setting Sun"	1996	1	27	—	—	6	—	—	—	80	—	BPI: Silver	Dig Your Own Hole
"Block Rockin' Beats"	1997	1	28	44	—	9	—	29	—	—^{[B]}	—	BPI: Gold; ARIA: Gold	Dig Your Own Hole
"Elektrobank"	1997	17	—	—	—	—	—	44	—	—^{[C]}	—		Dig Your Own Hole
"The Private Psychedelic Reel"	1997	—	—	—	—	—	—	—	—	—	—		Dig Your Own Hole
"Hey Boy Hey Girl"	1999	3	25	18	77	4	29	10	—	—	—	BPI: Platinum; ARIA: Platinum; RMNZ: Platinum	Surrender
"Let Forever Be"	1999	9	—	65	—	23	89	30	—	—	—	BPI: Silver	Surrender
"Out of Control"	1999	21	88	—	—	—	—	26	—	—	34		Surrender
"Music:Response"	2000	—	—	—	—	—	—	—	—	—	—		Surrender
"It Began in Afrika"	2001	8	60	46	69	15	—	—	89	—	1		Come with Us
"Star Guitar"	2002	8	52	58	—	10	76	49	73	—	2		Come with Us
"Come with Us" / "The Test"	2002	14	80	—	—	36	—	—	—	—	8		Come with Us
"The Golden Path" (featuring The Flaming Lips)	2003	17	89	—	—	20	—	—	—	—	—		Singles 93–03
"Get Yourself High" (featuring k-os)	2003	—	—	—	—	—	—	—	—	—	30		Singles 93–03
"Galvanize" (featuring Q-Tip)	2005	3	38	13	68	6	11	19	34	—	12	BPI: Platinum; ARIA: Platinum; RIAA: Gold; RMNZ: Gold	Push the Button
"Believe"	2005	18	69	48	—	22	90	—	63	—	—		Push the Button
"The Boxer"	2005	41	—	—	—	36	—	—	—	—	—		Push the Button
"Do It Again"	2007	12	—	8	—	10	26	—	86	—	—		We Are the Night
"The Salmon Dance" (featuring Fatlip)	2007	27	—	53	—	43	95	10	—	—	—	ARIA: Gold; RMNZ: Gold	We Are the Night
"Midnight Madness"	2008	80	—	63	—	—	—	—	—	—	—		Brotherhood
"Escape Velocity"	2010	—	—	—	—	—	—	—	—	—	—		Further
"Swoon"	2010	85	—	72	—	—	—	—	—	—	45		Further
"Another World"	2010	—	—	—	—	—	—	—	—	—	—		Further
"Container Park"	2011	—	—	—	—	—	—	—	—	—	—		Hanna
"Theme for Velodrome"	2012	—	—	—	—	—	—	—	—	—	—		Non-album single
"Go" (featuring Q-Tip)	2015	4	11	24	169	9	—	—	29	—	28	BPI: Platinum; ARIA: Platinum; RMNZ: Platinum	Born in the Echoes
"Under Neon Lights" (featuring St. Vincent)	2015	—	—	—	—	—	—	—	—	—	—		Born in the Echoes
"C-H-E-M-I-C-A-L"	2016	—	—	93	—	—	—	—	—	—	—		Born in the Echoes
"Free Yourself"	2018	—	—	—	—	—	—	—	—	—	—		No Geography
"MAH"	2019	—	—	—	—	—	—	—	—	—	—		No Geography
"Got to Keep On"	2019	— (Note: "Got to Keep On" did not enter the UK Singles Chart, but peaked at number 43 on the UK Singles Sales Chart, number 2 on the UK Physical Singles Chart and number 2 on the UK Vinyl Singles Chart.)	—	58	—	—	—	—	—	—	—		No Geography
"We've Got to Try"	2019	—	—	—	—	—	—	—	—	—	—		No Geography
"The Darkness That You Fear"	2021	— (Note: "The Darkness That You Fear" did not enter the UK Singles Chart, but peaked at number 38 on the UK Singles Downloads Chart, number 10 on the UK Physical Singles Chart and number 10 on the UK Vinyl Singles Chart.)	—	—	—	—	—	— (Note: "The Darkness That You Fear" did not enter the NZ Top 40 Singles Chart, but peaked at number 27 on the NZ Hot Singles Chart.)	—	—	—		For That Beautiful Feeling
"No Reason"	2023	— (Note: "No Reason" did not enter the UK Singles Chart, but peaked at number 37 on the UK Singles Downloads Chart, number 2 on the UK Physical Singles Chart and number 1 on the UK Vinyl Singles Chart.)	—	—	—	—	—	—	—	—	—		For That Beautiful Feeling
"Live Again" (featuring Halo Maud)	2023	—	—	—	—	—	—	—	—	—	—		For That Beautiful Feeling
"Skipping Like a Stone" (featuring Beck)	2023	—	—	—	—	—	—	—	—	—	—		For That Beautiful Feeling
"Goodbye"	2023	—	—	—	—	—	—	—	—	—	—		For That Beautiful Feeling
"—" denotes a recording that did not chart or was not released in that territory.

=== Promotional singles ===
List of promotional singles, showing year released and album name
Title	Year	Album
"Song to the Siren" (released under the name The Dust Brothers)	1992	Exit Planet Dust
"Electronic Battle Weapon 1 / 2"	1996	Non-album single
"Where Do I Begin"	1997	Dig Your Own Hole
"Electronic Battle Weapon 3 / 4"	1998	Non-album singles
"Only 4 the K People"	1999	Non-album singles
"Asleep from Day" / "Music: Response"	2000	Surrender
"Electronic Battle Weapon 5"	2001	Non-album singles
"Electronic Battle Weapon 6"	2002	Non-album singles
"Electronic Battle Weapon 7"	2004	Non-album singles
"Electronic Battle Weapon 8 / 9"	2006	Non-album singles
"Battle Scars" / "The Salmon Dance" (featuring Fatlip)	2007	We Are the Night
"Electronic Battle Weapon 10"	2010	Non-album single
"Horse Power"	2010	Further
"Theme for Velodrome"	2012	Non-album singles
"Electronic Battle Weapon 11"	2015	Non-album singles
"Work Energy Principle"	2021	Non-album singles
"All of a Sudden"	2023	Non-album singles

== Music videos ==
List of music videos, showing year released and director
Year	Album	Title	Director(s)
1995	Exit Planet Dust	"Life Is Sweet"	Walter A. Stern
1996	Dig Your Own Hole	"Setting Sun" (featuring Noel Gallagher)	Dom and Nic
1997	Dig Your Own Hole	"Block Rockin' Beats"	Dom and Nic
1997	Dig Your Own Hole	"Elektrobank"	Spike Jonze
1999	Surrender	"Hey Boy Hey Girl"	Dom and Nic
1999	Surrender	"Let Forever Be" (featuring Noel Gallagher)	Michel Gondry
1999	Surrender	"Out of Control"	W.I.Z.
2002	Come with Us	"Star Guitar"	Michel Gondry, Olivier Gondry
2002	Come with Us	"The Test"	Dom and Nic
2003	Singles 93–03	"The Golden Path" (featuring The Flaming Lips)	Chris Milk
2003	Singles 93–03	"Get Yourself High" (featuring k-os)	Joseph Kahn
2005	Push the Button	"Galvanize" (featuring Q-Tip)	Adam Smith
2005	Push the Button	"Believe"	Dom and Nic
2005	Push the Button	"The Boxer"	Ne-o
2007	We Are the Night	"Do It Again"	Michael Haussman
2007	We Are the Night	"The Salmon Dance" (featuring Fatlip)	Dom and Nic
2008	Brotherhood	"Midnight Madness"	Dom and Nic
2010	Further	"Another World"	Adam Smith, Marcus Lyall
2010	Further	"Dissolve"	Adam Smith, Marcus Lyall
2010	Further	"Escape Velocity"	Adam Smith, Marcus Lyall
2010	Further	"Horse Power"	Adam Smith, Marcus Lyall
2010	Further	"K+D+B"	Adam Smith, Marcus Lyall
2010	Further	"Snow"	Adam Smith, Marcus Lyall
2010	Further	"Swoon"	Adam Smith, Marcus Lyall
2010	Further	"Wonders of the Deep"	Adam Smith, Marcus Lyall
2015	Born in the Echoes	"Go" (featuring Q-Tip)	Michel Gondry
2015	Born in the Echoes	"Under Neon Lights"	Adam Smith
2015	Born in the Echoes	"Sometimes I Feel So Deserted"	Ninian Doff
2016	Born in the Echoes	"Wide Open" (featuring Beck)	Dom and Nic
2018	No Geography	"Free Yourself"	Dom and Nic
2019	No Geography	"Got to Keep On"	Michel Gondry, Olivier Gondry
2019	No Geography	"We've Got to Try"	Ninian Doff
2019	No Geography	"Eve of Destruction" (featuring Aurora)	Adam Smith, Marcus Lyall
2019	/	"Out of Control" (The Avalanches Surrender to Love Mix)	Kate Gibb, Jimmy Turrell, Computer Team
2021	For That Beautiful Feeling	"The Darkness That You Feel"	Ruffmercy
2023	For That Beautiful Feeling	"No Reason"	Adam Smith, Marcus Lyall
2023	For That Beautiful Feeling	"Live Again" (featuring Halo Maud)	Dom and Nic
2023	For That Beautiful Feeling	"Skipping Like a Stone" (featuring Beck)	Pensacola
2023	For That Beautiful Feeling	"Goodbye"	Adam Smith, Marcus Lyall

== Remixes ==
List of produced remixes by The Chemical Brothers for other artists, showing year released and release name
Year	Artist	Release	Song(s)
1993	Deep Throat	Mouth Organ single	Mouth Organ (Dust Brothers Remix)
1993	Swordfish	Missing Factor (The Atlas Mixes) / The Get On 12" single	The Get On (Dust Brothers Mix)
1993	Ariel	T-Baby 12" promo	T-Baby (The Dust Brothers Remix)
1993	Leftfield, Lydon	Open Up single	Open Up (The Dust Brothers Remix)
1993	Lionrock	Packet Of Peace single	Packet Of Peace (The Dust Brothers Remix)
1994	Sandals	Feet 12" promo	Feet (Vocal Mix) (as The Dust Brothers)
1994	Saint Etienne	Like A Motorway single and 12" promo	Like A Motorway (Chekhov Warp Dub) Like a Motorway (Chekhov Warp Mix)
1994	Primal Scream	Jailbird single	Jailbird (The Dust Brothers Mix)
1994	The Prodigy	Voodoo People single	Voodoo People (Dust Brothers Remix)
1994	Bomb the Bass featuring Justin Warfield	Bug Powder Dust single	Bug Powder Dust (Dust Brothers Remix)
1994	Manic Street Preachers	She Is Suffering single	La Tristesse Durera (Scream To A Sigh) Vocal Mix (as The Dust Brothers) La Tristesse Durera (Scream To A Sigh) Dub Mix (as The Dust Brothers)
1994	Justin Warfield	Pick It Up Y'All / Live From The Opium Den single	Pick It Up Y'All (Dust Brothers Vocal Mix)
1994	Republica	Out Of This World 12" promo	Out Of This World (The Dust Brothers Remix)
1994	The Charlatans	Jesus Hairdo single	Patrol (Dust Brothers Remix)
1995	The Sabres of Paradise	Versus compilation	Tow Truck (Chemical Brothers Mix)
1995	Method Man featuring Mary J. Blige	I'll Be There For You / You're All I Need To Get By single	Bring The Pain (Chemical Vocal) Bring The Pain (Chemical Instrumental)
1995	The Charlatans	The Charlatans UK V. The Chemical Brothers	Toothache (Chemical Risk Mix) Chemical Risk Dub (Toothache Mix) Nine Acre Dust Toothache (Instrumental Mix)
1995	The Chemical Brothers	Life Is Sweet single	Life Is Sweet (Remix 2) Leave Home (Terror Drums) Life Is Sweet (Remix 1) Chico’s Groove (Mix 2)
1996	Manic Street Preachers	A Design For Life single	Faster (Vocal Mix)
1996	Dave Clarke	No One's Driving single	No One's Driving (Chemical Brothers Remix)
1996	Manic Street Preachers	Everything Must Go single	Everything Must Go (The Chemical Brothers Remix)
1997	Primal Scream	Burning Wheel single	Burning Wheel (Chemical Brothers Remix)
1998	Spiritualized	I Think I'm In Love single	I Think I'm In Love (Chemical Brothers Vocal Remix) I Think I'm In Love (Chemical Brothers Instrumental)
1998	The Dust Brothers	Dead Man On Campus (Music From The Motion Picture) compilation	Realize (Chemical Brothers Remix)
1998	Mercury Rev	Delta Sun Bottleneck Stomp single	Delta Sun Bottleneck Stomp (Chemical Brothers Remix)
1999	Primal Scream	Swastika Eyes single	Swastika Eyes (Chemical Brothers Mix)
2001	Fatboy Slim	Ya Mama / Song For Shelter single	Song For Shelter (Chemical Brothers Mix)
2002	New Order	Here To Stay single	Here To Stay (Radio Edit) Here To Stay (Full Length Vocal)
2002	Beth Orton	Daybreaker album	Daybreaker
2003	Kylie Minogue	Slow 12" promo	Slow (The Chemical Brothers Remix)
2008	Vitalic and MBV	Digital Decks, Chemical Brothers mix album	Newman Made Me Realise (Chemical Edit)
2008	Oasis	Falling Down single	Falling Down (Chemical Brothers Remix)
2010	The Doors	Henry Saiz The Labyrinth #09 Featuring Hernan Cattaneo mix album	Riders On The Storm (The Chemical Brothers Chill Out Mix)
2013	Boys Noize	XTC 12" promo	XTC (The Chemical Brothers Remix)
2013	Stan the Flasher	R.O.U.E.N (The Mixes-2013 Edition)	Do ROUEN Again (Stan The Flasher vs. The Chemical Brothers CZPK's One Million Mashup)

== Notes ==
- A Further was deemed ineligible to chart on the UK Albums Chart due to all copies of Further giving buyers the chance to win an iPad; chart regulations forbid merchandise or prizes being used as enticements to buy releases.
- B "Block Rockin' Beats" did not enter the Billboard Hot 100, but peaked at number 7 on the Bubbling Under Hot 100 Singles chart, which acts as a 25-song extension to the Hot 100.
- C "Elektrobank" did not enter the Billboard Hot 100, but peaked at number 22 on the Bubbling Under Hot 100 Singles chart, which acts as a 25-song extension to the Hot 100.
