= Don't Think =

- Theatrical release poster
- Directed by: Adam Smith
- Music by: The Chemical Brothers
- Production company: Parlophone
- Release date: 3 February 2012
- Running time: 96 minutes
- Country: United Kingdom
- Language: English
- Budget: $500,000

Don't Think

Live album by The Chemical Brothers
- Released: 26 March 2012
- Recorded: 31 July 2011
- Venue: Fuji Rock Festival (Naeba Ski Resort, Naeba, Japan)
- Genre: Big beat; electronica; trip hop; house
- Length: 78:58
- Producer: The Chemical Brothers

The Chemical Brothers chronology
Hanna (2011)	Don't Think (2012)	Born in the Echoes (2015)

Don't Think is a 2012 live album and concert film of The Chemical Brothers when they performed at the Fuji Rock Festival the previous year. The original sound mix is notable for being 7.1 surround sound.

Professional ratings
Review scores
Source	Rating
AllMusic	3.5/5 stars
Pitchfork	8.2/10
Internet Movie Database	8.2/10
Rotten Tomatoes	86%
Total Film	4/5 stars
Digital Spy	4/5 stars
Empire	5/5 stars

== Track listing ==
=== DVD ===
1. "Tomorrow Never Knows" Intro by Junior Parker, not on CD
2. "Another World" from Further
3. "Do It Again" from We Are the Night
4. "Get Yourself High" from Singles 93–03
5. "Horse Power" from Further
6. "Chemical Beats" from Exit Planet Dust
7. "Swoon" from Further
8. "Star Guitar" from Come with Us
9. "Three Little Birdies Down Beats" from Exit Planet Dust
10. "Hey Boy Hey Girl" from Surrender
11. "Don't Think" from Further (bonus track)
12. "Out of Control" from Surrender
13. "Setting Sun" from Dig Your Own Hole
14. "It Doesn't Matter" from Dig Your Own Hole; not on CD
15. "Saturate" from We Are the Night
16. "Believe" from Push the Button
17. "Escape Velocity"/"The Golden Path" from Further/Singles 93–03
18. "Superflash" (Unreleased at the time, released in 2023 with their limited to 500 copys deluxe edition of the "Paused In Cosmic Reflexion" biography)
19. "Leave Home"/"Galvanize" from Exit Planet Dust/Push the Button
20. "Block Rockin' Beats"/"Das Spiegel" from Dig Your Own Hole/We Are the Night

=== CD ===
1. "Another World"/"Do It Again"/"Get Yourself High" – 7:22
2. "Horse Power"/"Chemical Beats" – 9:50
3. "Swoon"/"Star Guitar" – 10:59
4. "Three Little Birdies Down Beats"/"Hey Boy Hey Girl" – 5:34
5. "Don't Think"/"Out of Control"/"Setting Sun" – 10:12
6. "Saturate" – 7:38
7. "Believe" – 5:35
8. "Escape Velocity"/"The Golden Path" – 8:35
9. "Superflash" – 6:03
10. "Leave Home"/"Galvanize" – 2:19
11. "Block Rockin' Beats" – 4:51
