= Sowon =

Sowon may refer to:

- So-won, Korean given name

== History ==
- Seowon (also romanised Sŏwŏn), educational institutions in Korea during the Joseon Dynasty
- Sowon, the fourth rank of concubines of the king in styles and titles in the Joseon Dynasty

== Entertainment ==
- Hope (2013 film), South Korean film

== Geography ==
- Sowon-ri, village (ri) in Sinchon County, South Hwanghae Province, North Korea
- Sowon-myeon, township (myeon) in Taean County, South Chungcheong Province, South Korea

== People ==
- Kim So-won, South Korean actress and singer from the girl group GFriend

== See also ==
- Swoon (disambiguation)
