= Swoon =

Swoon may refer to:

- Swoon hypothesis, a number of theories about the resurrection of Jesus Christ
- Swoon (film), a film on the 1924 Leopold and Loeb murder case
- Swoon (artist), a graffiti artist from New York City
- DJ Swoon, former stage name of American musician Slushii
- Tom Swoon, Polish musician

== Music ==
- Swoon (Silversun Pickups album), the second album by Silversun Pickups
- Swoon (Prefab Sprout album), the debut album by Prefab Sprout
- "Swoon" (song), a 2010 single by The Chemical Brothers
