= Song to the Siren (The Chemical Brothers song) =

Promotional single by The Chemical Brothers

from the album Exit Planet Dust
- Released: 1 October 1992
- Recorded: 1992
- Genre: Electronic; big beat; acid house; hip-hop
- Length: 4:49
- Label: Diamond (1992); Junior Boys Own (1993)
- Producers: Tom Rowlands; Ed Simons

"Song to the Siren" is the debut single from British big beat duo The Chemical Brothers, released in October 1992 under the group's original name "The Dust Brothers". It was initially published under the "green label" for Diamond Records, later releasing under the Junior Boys Own label. The song uses a reversed vocal sample from the Dead Can Dance's song "Song to Sophia", from 1988, as well as several other samples, including the song "King of the Beats" by Mantronix.

== Background and composition ==
The Chemical Brothers (Tom Rowlands and Ed Simons) started to DJ in 1992, playing hip-hop, techno, and house. However, they initially called themselves "The Dust Brothers", incidentally similar to the US production duo of the same name famous for their work with The Beastie Boys. At the time, they were "dismayed by the absence of hip-hop headfuck techno", so they started to make their own creating their first single "Song to the Siren". It was recorded at home in 1992, taking over a year to finish.

It uses a Hitachi hi-fi system, an Atari ST, a sampler, and an "intense acidic keyboard lines slowed down to a Balearic swagger of about 110bpm mixed with a rigid hip hop-style break". The song is based around a "relatively lo-fi sample of This Mortal Coil's cover of the Tim Buckley track of the same name", alongside a sample of the Dead Can Dance track "Song to Sophia" and parts of Meat Beat Manifesto tracks.

When working on the song, Rowlands was inspired by "In Dub" by Renegade Soundwave, Meat Beat Manifesto's music, and Cocteau Twins' music.

== Release ==
"Song to the Siren" was originally self-released by their own record label, "Diamond Records" (named after Ed's nickname), on a green 12" one-sided vinyl pressing, featuring a BBC Micro computer artwork made by Simons with his friend from school. After printing up to 900 copies, they sold them to record stores around London, sometimes ringing up record shops beforehand as customers interested in buying "this record with a big siren on it and a fuck-off beat" that they "heard Andy Weatherall playing the other day". And the shops bought their records, "because they'd had the Siren Bloke on the phone earlier that day".

Eventually, they caught the attention of London DJ Andrew Weatherall, who liked the song and subsequently played it "a lot" in his DJ sets, as did such DJs as Justin Robertson and Darren Emerson. In May 1993 Junior Boy's Own record label, through Weatherall's recommendation, offered the Chemical Brothers to release "Song to the Siren"; they agreed on one condition, that Weatherall would make remixes of the song. Weatherall agreed, working on them as part of his The Sabres of Paradise project and calling the two remix versions: "Full Sabre mix" and "Sabre 100% Chunk mix".

The original version lasts four minutes and 49 seconds. Another version lasted four minutes and 30 seconds, which later appeared on Singles 93–03. The version featured on Exit Planet Dust is a live version, and is notably shorter at three minutes and 16 seconds. Though the 4:49 version has never been released on a Chemical Brothers CD, it appears on JBO: A Perspective 1988–1998, a compilation of material mostly brought in from the Junior Boy's Own label.

== Critical reception ==
UDiscover Music placed "Song to the Siren" at the 20th spot in their ranking of "20 Electronic Classics" by Chemical Brothers.

== Track listings ==
1. "Song to the Siren"
2. "Song to the Siren (Full Sabre mix)"
3. "Song to the Siren (Original Dust Brothers mix)"
4. "Song to the Siren (Sabre 100% Chunk mix)"
