= The Salmon Dance =

2007 single by the Chemical Brothers

Single by the Chemical Brothers

from the album We Are the Night
- B-side: "Snooprah"; "Electronic Battle Weapon 8"
- Released: 10 September 2007
- Label: Freestyle Dust; Virgin
- Songwriters: Derrick Lemel Stewart; Tom Rowlands; Ed Simons
- Producer: The Chemical Brothers

The Chemical Brothers singles chronology
| "Do It Again" (2007) | "The Salmon Dance" (2007) | "Midnight Madness" (2008) |

Music video
- "The Salmon Dance" on YouTube

"The Salmon Dance" is a song by English electronic music duo the Chemical Brothers and is the seventh track on their 2007 studio album We Are the Night. It features vocals by Fatlip and was released as the second single from the album on 10 September 2007. The single reached number 10 on the New Zealand RIANZ Singles Chart, mainly due to downloads and airplay. It also reached number 27 on the UK Singles Chart, and was their last UK top-40 hit for 19 years, until Go reached number 4 in May 2026. Its video was also nominated for a MTV Europe Music Award in 2007.

== Music video ==
The video, directed by Dom and Nic, features a boy (played by British actor Rory Jennings) looking at his fish tank, which is home to Fatlip the Piranha, his friend "Sammy the Salmon" (actually a squirrel fish), Puffa the beatboxing pufferfish, a lionfish, and various other tropical fish such as seahorses, butterflyfish, angelfish and tangs.

== Track listings ==
UK 7-inch single

1. "The Salmon Dance" (album version)
2. "Snooprah"

UK 12-inch single

1. "The Salmon Dance" (album version)
2. "Electronic Battle Weapon 8"
3. "The Salmon Dance" (Crookers 'Wow' mix)
4. "The Salmon Dance" (Hervé mix)

UK CD single

1. "The Salmon Dance" (radio edit) – 3:07
2. "Electronic Battle Weapon 8" – 6:32

iTunes remix single

1. "The Salmon Dance" (Heavily Smoked By the Glimmers)

== Charts ==
| Chart (2007) | Peak position |
|---|---|
| Belgium (Ultratip Bubbling Under Flanders) | 3 |
| Netherlands (Single Top 100) | 95 |
| New Zealand (Recorded Music NZ) | 10 |
| Scottish Singles Sales (Official Charts) | 19 |
| UK Singles (Official Charts) | 27 |
| UK Dance (Official Charts) | 1 |

== Certifications ==
Certifications for "The Salmon Dance"
| Region | Certification | Certified units/sales |
|---|---|---|
| Australia (ARIA) | Gold | 35,000^{‡} |
| New Zealand (RMNZ) | Gold | 7,500^{*} |
^{*} Sales figures based on certification alone.^{‡} Sales+streaming figures based on certification alone.
