= Life Is Sweet (song) =

1995 single by the Chemical Brothers

Single by the Chemical Brothers

from the album Exit Planet Dust
- B-side: "Chico's Groove"
- Released: 28 August 1995
- Length: 6:33
- Label: Virgin
- Songwriters: Tim Burgess; Tom Rowlands; Ed Simons
- Producer: The Chemical Brothers

The Chemical Brothers singles chronology
| "Leave Home" (1995) | "Life Is Sweet" (1995) | "Loops of Fury" (1996) |

Music video
- "Life Is Sweet" on YouTube

"Life Is Sweet" is a song by the English big beat duo the Chemical Brothers, released in August 1995 by Virgin Records as the second and final single from their first album, Exit Planet Dust (1995). It features Tim Burgess from English rock band the Charlatans on vocals. "Life Is Sweet" reached number 25 on the UK Singles Chart.

== Critical reception ==
Paul Lester from Melody Maker commented, "Imagine 'Daydream Believer' by The Monkees via The Prodigy's nucleartechno control panel." Simon Williams from NME named it Single of the Week, adding, "Crunchy on the outside! And crunchy on the inside, too! Fact: 'Life Is Sweet' is so good it has just made a car crash in my street." Another NME editor, Stephen Dalton, wrote, "Stumble out into the dawn streets with a still-buzzing Tim Burgess on the glorious 'Life is Sweet', his choirboy voice royally f—ed up and slumped across a mere slip of melody." Helen Lamont from Smash Hits gave it four out of five, saying, "This is weird. It's like Black Grape meets Leftfield, probably in Berlin. It's full of strange industrial noises, like dodgy plumbing thumping away, with some bloke singing in the distance. It's not exactly an all-together-now sort of number, (unless you're someone who can get a tune from a lawnmower), but it's good all the same."

== Music video ==
The music video for the song shows The Chemical Brothers playing the song and controlling four people: a couple and two "children". In the video, The Chemical Brothers realise that some of their equipment is breaking and Tom Rowlands tries to fix it while singer Tim Burgess watches them through a hole in the wall.

== Track listings ==
The remixes of the song notably contain very little of the original track. Daft Punk's remix was reportedly only the duo's third released recording. "If I Kling to Me I'll Klong to You" originally appeared on the 12-inch only My Mercury Mouth E.P (1994).

- UK CD No. 1
1. "Life Is Sweet" (album version) – 6:34
2. "Life Is Sweet" (remix two) – 6:16
3. "Life Is Sweet" (Daft Punk remix) – 8:39
4. "Leave Home" (Terror Drums) – 3:46
- UK CD No. 2
1. "Life Is Sweet" (remix one) – 7:05
2. "If You Kling to Me I'll Klong to You" – 5:24
3. "Chico's Groove" (mix two) – 4:03
- 12-inch single
1. "Life Is Sweet"
2. "Life Is Sweet" (Daft Punk remix)
3. "Life Is Sweet" (remix one)
4. "Life Is Sweet" (remix two)

== Charts ==
| Chart (1995) | Peak position |
|---|---|
| UK Singles (Official Charts) | 25 |
| US Dance Club Songs (Billboard) | 31 |
