= Exit Planet Dust =

Studio album by the Chemical Brothers
- Released: 26 June 1995
- Recorded: 1993: August–November 1994
- Genre: Big beat; electronica; psychedelia; acid house
- Length: 49:28
- Label: Junior Boy's Own; Freestyle Dust; Virgin
- Producer: Tom Rowlands; Ed Simons; Cheeky Paul

The Chemical Brothers chronology
Exit Planet Dust (1995)	Dig Your Own Hole (1997)

Singles from Exit Planet Dust
- 1. "Leave Home" Released: 5 June 1995; 2. "Life Is Sweet" Released: 28 August 1995

Exit Planet Dust is the debut studio album by English electronic music duo the Chemical Brothers. It was first released on 26 June 1995 in the United Kingdom by Junior Boy's Own, Freestyle Dust, and Virgin Records, and on 15 August 1995 in the United States by Astralwerks. The album was recorded between August and November 1994, with "Song to the Siren" performed live. Its title is a reference to their departure from their earlier name the Dust Brothers.

The album received critical acclaim and was in the UK charts for many weeks, charting in each year from its release in 1995 until 2000; its highest peak was number 9 in 1995.

== Background ==
Their initial work included a remix of an Ariel song (a band which included Tom Rowlands of the Chemical Brothers on drums), released under their '237 Turbo Nutters' name, and the track "Song to the Siren", issued as an independent single on Diamond Records, reportedly inspired by a nickname Ed Simons had. The single also contained two longform remixes of the track. The band took the song to various dance record shops around London but no one picked it up. "Song to the Siren" was made simply using a Hitachi hi-fi system, an Atari ST, a sampler, and a keyboard, using a sample of This Mortal Coil.

Andrew Weatherall of the Sabres of Paradise had heard the track. He decided to play it live in his DJ sets and suggested Steven Hall sign the duo to Junior Boy's Own record label, which re-released the single in 1993. The band had become popular remixers, mixing tracks ranging from "Jailbird" by Primal Scream to "Voodoo People" by the Prodigy (their remix of this particular track also became the A-side of "Voodoo People" on select versions).

== Recording ==
The album's recording began in August 1994 and concluded in November. Tom Rowlands stated in 2002 that they "stayed up for three weeks making it". One song from the sessions, "Leave Home", was first released in late 1994 on the duo's mix album, NME Xmas Dust Up, released as a covermount cassette tape in an issue of NME. The first six tracks on Exit Planet Dust are continuous, making a medley. These six tracks include "Leave Home"; and edits of the duo's previous songs "Chemical Beats" and their first track "Song to the Siren", the latter being recorded live on the album from Sabresonic nightclub in March 1994, which belonged to Weatherall's act the Sabres of Paradise, who also remixed "Leave Home".

The duo became resident DJs at the small—but hugely influential—Heavenly Sunday Social Club at the Albany pub in London's Great Portland Street at this point. The likes of Noel Gallagher, Paul Weller, James Dean Bradfield, and Tim Burgess were regular visitors. The Dust Brothers (as they were known at the time) were subsequently asked to remix tracks by Manic Street Preachers and the Charlatans.

The album was finished by 1995 and released on the Junior Boy's Own label, in conjunction with the Chemical Brothers' own independent leg of that label, Freestyle Dust; and Virgin Records, which later replaced Junior Boy's Own as the band's head label. The duo, however, had to change their name to the Chemical Brothers after the American production duo Dust Brothers had threatened to sue them if they refused to. The Chemical Brothers name came from the duo's track "Chemical Beats". The name change inspired the name of the album.

== Content ==
=== Samples ===
The beginning of "Leave Home" is a short sample of the beginning of the Kraftwerk song "Ohm Sweet Ohm" from the album Radio-Activity. Also sampled are percussion sections from Pucho & His Latin Soul Brothers' "Got Myself a Good Man" and vocals from "Brothers Gonna Work It Out" by Blake Baxter (1992), as well as short samples from "The Defector" by Recoil. "In Dust We Trust" contains several short samples of the Beastie Boys song "The Maestro" from the album Check Your Head. The vocal sample in "Song to the Siren" is a reversed sample of part of the Dead Can Dance track "Song of Sophia" from the album The Serpent's Egg. "Song to the Siren" also samples drums from "God O.D." by Meat Beat Manifesto.

=== Artwork ===
The cover of the album was from a 1970s fashion shoot reject box, according to Ed Simons. In a 1995 interview with Select magazine, Simons said, "We wanted something that just looked nice. A lot of techno albums just have fractals on them, and we wanted something a bit more romantic and otherworldly with soft, nice colours. It's the wrong way round as well - intentionally. If me and Tom are in that picture we're in the car going, "Oh she's alright, I wish I had a guitar on my back with her." That would rank as one of the good things in life. Originally we had this pregnant woman in a field wearing this white see-though dress, like a Flake advert gone wrong. But we couldn't use it because the unborn child could have sued us". Stylus Magazine said that the people on the cover "are presumably travelling, but are content on making their own way—content travellers in a picturesque setting." Another image from the same fashion photo shoot was used as one of the images in the Dig Your Own Hole booklet.

The reference to "the kids from Orlando" in the liner thank you notes is a reference to the duo's first performance in the United States, at The Edge nightclub in Orlando, Florida on 4 July 1993. The LP features a series of messages on the run-out grooves. One of them, "Huw is innocent!" on side four, apparently refers to Rowlands' brother. This message would later be referenced on the LP of Push the Button (2005), where the side four run-out message claims "Huw is still innocent!"

== Release ==
The album was released in the UK in June 1995. Shortly before its release, Ed Simons said to Muzik that "nobody from the dance world has come up with an album to reflect these times. Why is that? Why is it left to a group like Oasis to express the way that young people want to go out and get battered every weekend? That's what The Chemical Brothers are about".

"Leave Home" was released as the first official single from the album on 5 June 1995. It reached number 17 in the UK Singles Chart. "Life Is Sweet" was released as the second single on 28 August 1995 and reached number 25 in the UK Singles Chart.

The album was certified platinum by the BPI on 1 January 1996. On 30 October 2000, the album was released on MiniDisc. In 2004, the album was packaged with 1997's Dig Your Own Hole in a limited edition box set as part of EMI's "2CD Originals" collection.

== Reception ==
Professional ratings
Review scores
Source	Rating
AllMusic	5/5 stars
Encyclopedia of Popular Music	4/5 stars
The Guardian	4/5 stars
Muzik	3/5 stars
NME	8/10
Q	3/5 stars
The Rolling Stone Album Guide	3/5 stars
Select	4/5
The Village Voice	A−

Exit Planet Dust received praise upon release. NME described the album as "brash, raw, rule-bending gear made by open-minded music fans, for open-minded music fans."

The album has received retrospective acclaim and continues to inspire. Muzik named it the second best dance album of all time in 2002 and Q TV named it the 41st best album of the 1990s. AllMusic's top-marks review states "The Chemical Brothers' sound is big on bombast, replete with screeching guitar samples and lots of sirens and screaming divas. A breakthrough album of sorts, Exit Planet Dust was, upon its release, one of the few European post-techno albums to make any sort of headway into the stateside market."

Following the album's release, the duo were thanked in the liner notes of Better Living Through Chemistry by Fatboy Slim and Homework by Daft Punk. Tim O'Neil of PopMatters described the former album as "one of the first albums—and probably the best, outside of the Chems' own later material—to take the rough template of [Exit Planet Dust] as a direct model." The Edge also named it his favourite album of 1995.

The album was also included in the book 1001 Albums You Must Hear Before You Die.

Stereogum did a review in 2015, 20 years after the album release and called it one of the "best psychedelic rock records of the '90s."

== Track listing ==
All tracks are written by Tom Rowlands and Ed Simons, except where noted.

No.	Title	Length
1.	"Leave Home" (Rowlands, Simons, Blake Baxter)	5:32
2.	"In Dust We Trust"	5:17
3.	"Song to the Siren"	3:16
4.	"Three Little Birdies Down Beats"	5:38
5.	"Fuck Up Beats"	1:25
6.	"Chemical Beats"	4:50
7.	"Chico's Groove"	4:48
8.	"One Too Many Mornings" (Rowlands, Simons, Mike Mason, Louise Treahy)	4:13
9.	"Life Is Sweet" (Rowlands, Simons, Tim Burgess)	6:33
10.	"Playground for a Wedgeless Firm" (Rowlands, Steve Jones)	2:31
11.	"Alive Alone"	5:16
Total length:		49:19

Sample credits

- "Leave Home" contains samples of "Brothers Gonna Work It Out", written and performed by Blake Baxter.
- "One Too Many Mornings" contains samples of "Peekaboo" and "Follow Me Down", both written by Mike Mason and Louise Treahy and performed by Swallow.

== Personnel ==
Credits for Exit Planet Dust adapted from album liner notes.

The Chemical Brothers

- Tom Rowlands – production
- Ed Simons – production

Additional musicians

- Tim Burgess – vocals on "Life Is Sweet"
- Beth Orton – vocals on "Alive Alone"
- Seggs – bass on "Leave Home"

Additional technical personnel

- Cheeky Paul – compiling, editing
- Steve "Dub" Jones – engineering
- Tim Holmes – engineering (assistant)
- Dan Zamani – engineering on "One Too Many Mornings"
- Mike Marsh – mastering

Design

- Negativespace – design

== Charts ==
=== Weekly charts ===
Chart (1995)	Peak position
Belgian Albums (Ultratop Flanders)	49
Dutch Albums (Album Top 100)	77
New Zealand Albums (RMNZ)	42
Scottish Albums (OCC)	24
Swedish Albums (Sverigetopplistan)	17
UK Albums (OCC)	9

== Certifications and sales ==
Region	Certification	Certified units/sales
Australia (ARIA)	Gold	35,000^{‡}
United Kingdom (BPI)	Platinum	314,000
United States	—	750,000
Summaries
Worldwide	—	1,000,000
^{‡} Sales+streaming figures based on certification alone.
