= Another World (The Chemical Brothers song) =

Single by The Chemical Brothers

from the album Further
- B-side: "Horse Power"
- Released: 18 August 2010
- Recorded: 2009–10
- Genre: House
- Length: 5:40 (original version); 2:57 (radio edit)
- Label: Virgin; Freestyle Dust
- Songwriters: Anthony E. Ferguson; Martin Hall; Tom Rowlands; Robert J. Shurgin; Ed Simons
- Producer: The Chemical Brothers

The Chemical Brothers singles chronology
"Swoon" (2010)	"Another World" (2010)	"Horse Power" (2010)

Music video
- "Another World" on YouTube

"Another World" is a song by The Chemical Brothers, and the third song and second single from Further, their seventh studio album released 14 June 2010. It lasts 5:40 but there is a shorter version featured on the single, video, and radio. The single was released on 18 August 2010 in the UK. The duo talked to Lauren Laverne on BBC Radio 6 Music about the song.

== Music video ==
The music video is first featured in the Adam Smith and Marcus Lyal film Further, which is the second disc of the CD+DVD version of the Further album. The video is simply taken from that film the original part which featured "Another World" (17:04–22:44 in the original film).

== Track listing ==
1. "Another World" (radio edit) – 2:57
2. "Swoon" (Boyz Noize summer remix) – 5:21
3. "Swoon" (Lindstrøm and Prins Thomas remix) – 9:27
4. "Horse Power" (Popof remix) – 6:35

The B-sides were originally featured on a 12" limited edition vinyl, and on individual download singles.

== Chart performance ==
Chart (2010)	Peak position
UK Dance (OCC)	12
Mexico Ingles Airplay (Billboard)	14
Dance Singles Sales (Billboard)	4
Dance/Electronic Digital Songs Sales (Billboard)	36
