= Out of Control (The Chemical Brothers song) =

1999 single by the Chemical Brothers

Single by the Chemical Brothers

from the album Surrender
- B-side: "Power Move"
- Released: 8 October 1999
- Studio: Orinoco (South London, England)
- Length: 7:20 (album version); 4:00 (radio edit)
- Label: Freestyle Dust; Virgin
- Songwriters: Tom Rowlands; Ed Simons; Bernard Sumner
- Producer: The Chemical Brothers

The Chemical Brothers singles chronology
"Let Forever Be" (1999)	"Out of Control" (1999)	"Music: Response" (2000)

Music video
- "Out of Control" on YouTube

"Out of Control" is a song by English big beat duo the Chemical Brothers, released as the third single from their third album, Surrender (1999). The song's vocals and guitar are performed by Bernard Sumner from New Order, and additional vocals are provided by Bobby Gillespie of Primal Scream.

Following its release on 8 October 1999, "Out of Control" peaked at number 21 on the UK Singles Chart and claimed the number-one spot on the UK Dance Chart. It also reached the top 50 in New Zealand and Spain, as well as on the US Billboard Dance Club Play chart.

== Music video ==
The music video of the song was directed by W.I.Z. The video's cast includes actress Rosario Dawson and Michel Brown and depicts a Mexican conflict between government and Zapatista Army of National Liberation, a revolutionary group that appeared during the 1990s. It is then revealed to be an advertisement for a fictional Coca-Cola-type beverage. The camera pans out to reveal it being displayed in an electronic shop, before the storefront is smashed in and the video ends with shaky night-time footage of violent urban riots, shot on handheld cameras.

== Track listings ==
UK and US CD single, UK cassette single
No.	Title	Length
1.	"Out of Control"	7:20
2.	"Power Move"	4:11
3.	"Out of Control" (Sasha remix)	7:19

UK and US 12-inch single, European CD single
No.	Title	Length
1.	"Out of Control"	7:20
2.	"Out of Control" (Sasha club mix)	11:02

Japanese CD single
No.	Title	Length
1.	"Out of Control" (radio edit)	3:58
2.	"Power Move"	4:09
3.	"Out of Control" (Sasha remix)	7:18
4.	"Out of Control" (Sasha club mix)	11:00
5.	"Out of Control" (Sasha instrumental)	13:22

== Credits and personnel ==
Credits are lifted from the Surrender album booklet.

Studios

- Recorded at Orinoco Studios (South London, England)
- Edited at Berwick Street Studios (London, England)
- Mastered at The Exchange (London, England)

Personnel

- The Chemical Brothers – production
  - Tom Rowlands – writing
  - Ed Simons – writing
- Bernard Sumner – writing, vocals, guitar
- Bobby Gillespie – additional vocals
- Steve Dub – engineering
- Cheeky Paul – editing
- Mike Marsh – mastering

== Charts ==
Chart (1999–2000)	Peak position
Australia (ARIA)	88
Europe (Eurochart Hot 100)	65
New Zealand (Recorded Music NZ)	26
Scottish Singles Sales (Official Charts)	16
Spain (Promusicae)	18
Sweden (Sverigetopplistan)	55
UK Singles (Official Charts)	21
UK Dance (Official Charts)	1
US Dance Club Songs (Billboard)	34

== Release history ==
Region	Date	Format(s)	Label(s)	Catalogue	Ref.
United States	21 September 1999	Alternative radio	Freestyle Dust; Astralwerks	—N/a	
Japan	8 October 1999	CD	Freestyle Dust; Virgin	VJCP-61028	
United Kingdom	11 October 1999	CD; cassette	Freestyle Dust; Virgin	CHEMSD10; CHEMSC10	
