= Let Forever Be =

1999 single by the Chemical Brothers

Single by the Chemical Brothers

from the album Surrender
- B-side: "The Diamond Sky"; "Studio K"
- Released: 23 July 1999
- Studio: Orinoco (South London, England)
- Genre: Alternative rock; big beat; psychedelic
- Length: 3:56 (album version); 3:40 (radio edit)
- Label: Freestyle Dust; Virgin
- Songwriters: Tom Rowlands; Ed Simons; Noel Gallagher
- Producer: The Chemical Brothers

The Chemical Brothers singles chronology
"Hey Boy Hey Girl" (1999)	"Let Forever Be" (1999)	"Out of Control" (1999)

Noel Gallagher singles chronology
"Setting Sun" (1996)	"Let Forever Be" (1999)	"Keep What Ya Got" (2004)

Music video
- "Let Forever Be" on YouTube

"Let Forever Be" is a song by English electronic music duo the Chemical Brothers, released as the second single from their third studio album, Surrender (1999), on 23 July 1999 in Japan and on 2 August in the United Kingdom. It contains uncredited vocals from Noel Gallagher of Britpop band Oasis, who also co-wrote the song and previously worked with the Chemical Brothers on "Setting Sun".

"Let Forever Be" was the Chemical Brothers' fourth top-10 single in the United Kingdom, peaking at number nine on the UK Singles Chart. It was also successful in Hungary, where it debuted and peaked at number two, and it reached the top 40 in Ireland and New Zealand. In the United States, the single reached the top 30 on two Billboard charts: the Maxi-Singles Sales chart and the Modern Rock Tracks chart.

== Music video ==
The video for the track was directed by Michel Gondry. Actress and dancer Stephanie Landwehr) stars in the video, which drew visual inspiration from Ray Davies' 1975 Granada TV production Starmaker; the video received much media attention and became one of the most well-known videos from the band. The video also makes specific visual and thematic references to the dance sequence "I Only Have Eyes For You" (music by Harry Warren; lyrics by Al Dubin), choreographed by Busby Berkeley for the Warner Bros. musical Dames (1934) directed by Ray Enright. Pitchfork Media named the video the "quintessential Michel Gondry video" and ranked it at number seven in their list of the "Top 50 Music Videos of the 1990s".

== Track listings ==
Standard CD, 12-inch, and cassette single

1. "Let Forever Be"
2. "The Diamond Sky"
3. "Studio K"

European CD single

1. "Let Forever Be" (album version)
2. "Studio K"

== Credits and personnel ==
Credits are lifted from the Surrender album booklet.

Studios

- Recorded at Orinoco Studios (South London, England)
- Edited at Berwick Street Studios (London, England)
- Mastered at The Exchange (London, England)

Personnel

- The Chemical Brothers – production
  - Tom Rowlands – writing
  - Ed Simons – writing
- Noel Gallagher – writing (credited), vocals (uncredited)
- Steve Dub – engineering
- Cheeky Paul – editing
- Mike Marsh – mastering

== Charts ==
=== Weekly charts ===
Chart (1999)	Peak position
Belgium (Ultratip Bubbling Under Flanders)	15
Europe (Eurochart Hot 100)	37
Hungary (Mahasz)	2
Ireland (IRMA)	23
Netherlands (Single Top 100)	89
New Zealand (Recorded Music NZ)	30
Scottish Singles Sales (Official Charts)	7
UK Singles (Official Charts)	9
UK Dance (Official Charts)	9
US Alternative Airplay (Billboard)	29
US Dance Singles Sales (Billboard)	18

=== Year-end charts ===
Chart (1999)	Position
UK Singles (OCC)	198

== Certifications ==
Region	Certification	Certified units/sales
United Kingdom (BPI)	Silver	200,000^{‡}
^{‡} Sales+streaming figures based on certification alone.

== Release history ==
Region	Date	Format(s)	Label(s)	Ref.
Japan	23 July 1999	CD	Freestyle Dust; Virgin	
United Kingdom	2 August 1999	7-inch vinyl; 12-inch vinyl; CD; cassette	Freestyle Dust; Virgin	
United States	3 August 1999	CD	Astralwerks	
