= Get Yourself High =

Single by The Chemical Brothers featuring k-os

from the album Singles 93–03
- B-side: "Electronic Battle Weapon 6"
- Released: 17 November 2003
- Recorded: 2003
- Genre: Electronica; alternative hip-hop
- Length: 5:48
- Label: Virgin; Astralwerks; Freestyle Dust
- Songwriters: Tom Rowlands; Ed Simons; Kevin Brereton
- Producer: The Chemical Brothers

The Chemical Brothers singles chronology
"The Golden Path" (2003)	"Get Yourself High" (2003)	"Galvanize" (2004)

Music video
- "Get Yourself High" on YouTube

"Get Yourself High" is a 2003 single by The Chemical Brothers. It features Canadian rapper k-os and appeared as a bonus track on their collection Singles 93–03. A music video featuring footage from a martial arts film accompanied the song. The song was nominated for a Grammy Award for Best Dance Recording, but lost to "Toxic" by Britney Spears.

== Critical reception ==
Writing for Stylus Magazine, Andrew Unterberger said the song is "resoundingly meh" with "a thoroughly OK production with some grating vocals" from k-os, and then favors another new track from Singles 93–03, "The Golden Path." In complete contrast, David Medsker from PopMatters prefer the song over "The Golden Path", called it their "first real hip-hop track" that "demands its listeners to drop and do the worm." He also stated: "[...] There’s something about the key, a combination of a major note and its sharp, that sticks in the craw. This will sound very cool in the clubs." musicOMH's Jamie Harper said the song "goes into new territory, as [the duo] invite Canadian rapper K-OS to MC over their creation."

A new version of the song appeared on their live album Don't Think received a positive feedback from Nate Patrin of Pitchfork Media, he stated: "It all flows so smoothly so immediately that tracks which felt like late-career missteps on album-- like overstuffed pigeon-toed funk oddities like "Do It Again" and "Get Yourself High", which show up in succession in the set's first 10 minutes—come across as all-hook monsters, fused in a way that splits the difference and shaves off all the fat."

== Music video ==
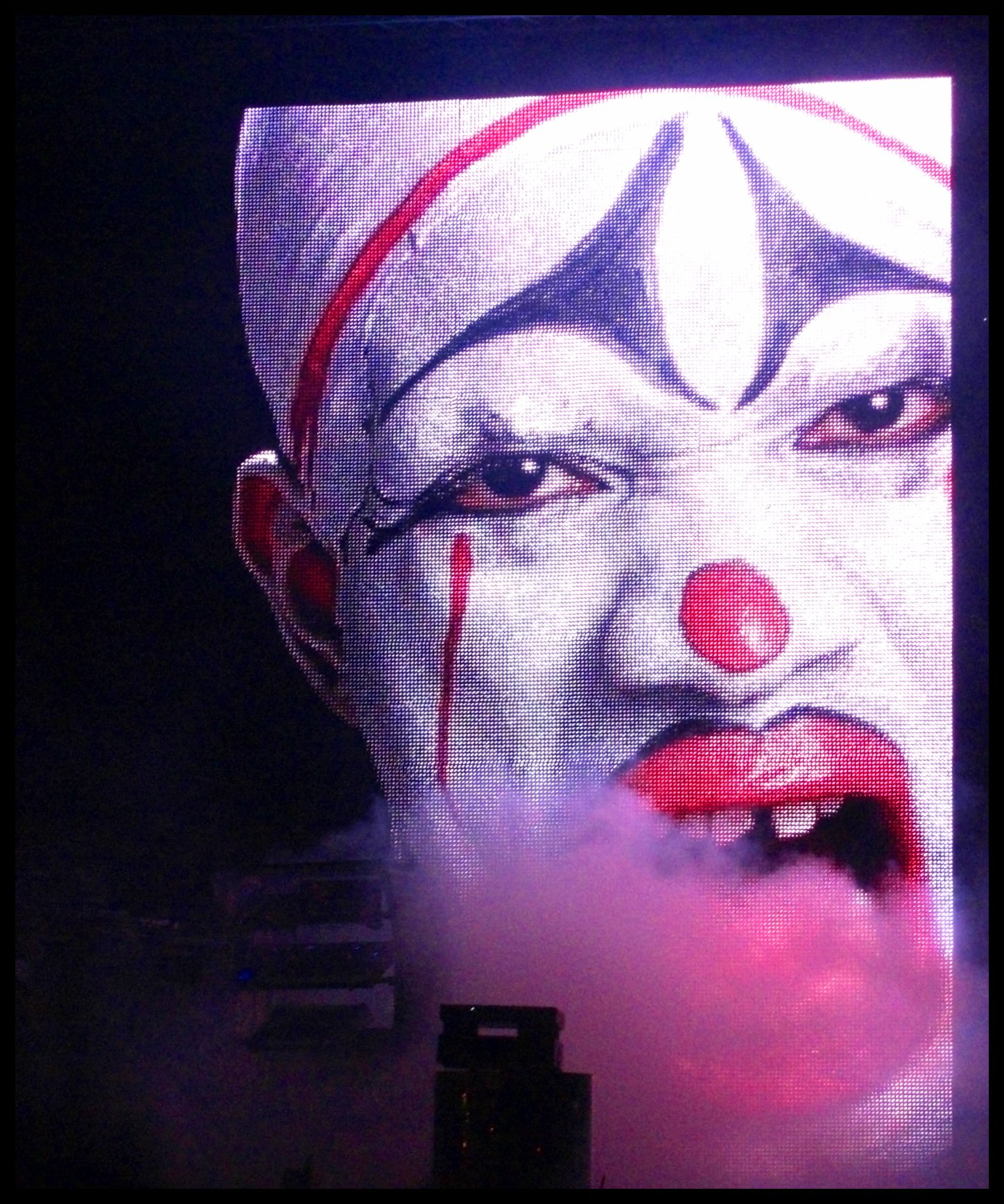
The duo performing the song at Summercase 2007.

The song's music video was edited by Joseph Kahn using digitally manipulated footage from the 1980 Hong Kongese martial arts film 2 Champions of Shaolin.

I edited this on a laptop on a plane to Chicago. I rearranged the time sequencing of the actual movie. The bad guy with the big boombox is actually a minor henchman who dies in the first 30 minutes, but in my visual remix he’s the ultimate antagonist. The lip syncing was motion captured, then applied to 3D models of jaws. I didn’t know 100% if the technology was achievable with the time and money, nor did I know if we could actually get rights to a Chinese kung fu flick. It was a risky venture, but Carole gave me a check and then left me alone. She had some major balls.

Ashley Ringrose from Smashing Magazine listed the video at number 32 for his list of "60 Beautiful Music Videos."

== Track listings ==
=== United Kingdom and Europe ===
- (UK and Europe) CD CHEMSD19
1. "Get Yourself High (album version)"
2. "Electronic Battle Weapon 6"
3. "Get Yourself High (Felix Da Housecat's Chemical Meltdown mix)"
4. "Get Yourself High (Switches Rely on dub)"
5. "Get Yourself High (video)"
- (UK only) 2x12" CHEMST19
1. "Get Yourself High (extended version)"
2. "Electronic Battle Weapon 6"
3. "Get Yourself High (Felix Da Housecat's Chemical Meltdown mix)"
4. "Get Yourself High (Switches Rely on rub)"
- (Europe only) CD 07243 547658 2 7
1. "Get Yourself High (album version)"
2. "Electronic Battle Weapon 6"
3. "Get Yourself High (Felix Da Housecat's Chemical Meltdown mix)"
4. "Get Yourself High (Switches Rely on dub)"

=== Japan ===
- CD VJCP 12175
1. "Get Yourself High (album version)"
2. "Electronic Battle Weapon 6"
3. "Get Yourself High (Felix Da Housecat's Chemical Meltdown mix)"
4. "Get Yourself High (Switches Rely on dub)"
5. "Get Yourself High (Switches Rely on rub)"
6. "Get Yourself High (video)"

=== United States ===
- CD ASW 47738
1. "Get Yourself High (extended version)"
2. "Get Yourself High (Felix Da Housecat's Chemical Meltdown mix)"
3. "Get Yourself High (Switches Rely on rub)"
4. "The Golden Path (Ewan Pearson extended vocal)"
5. "The Golden Path (Ewan's Rave Hell dub)"
6. "Nude Night"
7. "Get Yourself High (video)"
- 12" ASW 47737
1. "Get Yourself High (extended version)"
2. "Get Yourself High (Switches Rely on rub)"
3. "Get Yourself High (Felix Da Housecat's Chemical Meltdown mix)"
4. "Get Yourself High (Switches Rely on dub)"
