= Swallow (British band) =

British shoegaze band

- Origin: Camberwell, London, England
- Genres: Shoegazing, dream pop
- Years active: 1990–1994
- Labels: 4AD; Rough Trade
- Past members: Mike Mason; Louise Trehy
- Website: busygoingcrazy.com

Swallow were a British-based duo of Mike Mason and Louise Trehy. Signed to 4AD, they only released one studio album and one remix collection before leaving the label. They moved on to Rough Trade Records for a further EP before disbanding.

== History ==
Mike Mason had previously played as a live keyboard player for Into Paradise, while Louise Trehy had founded record label Setanta with Keith Cullen. Mike Mason had also directed and produced promotional video for Spacemen 3. They were signed by 4AD after sending a demo to the label. The band released their debut album Blow in July 1992. Initially compared with Cocteau Twins and My Bloody Valentine, the band remixed the Blow album to break down the John Fryer production, creating the limited edition follow-up release Blowback. After relationships with 4AD broke down, Swallow began writing and recording at home. A newly funded Rough Trade records released the four track EP Hush, which included a cover of Steve Miller's "Dear Mary". Around the time of the EP's release in 1994, Swallow briefly toured with Mazzy Star. The Chemical Brothers sampled Swallow for their track "One Too Many Mornings".

In the middle of recording their second full-length album, Rough Trade lost their funding, and Swallow's recording efforts were in tatters. By this point, Mike Mason and Louise Trehy's relationship ended, and Swallow quietly disbanded.

Louise Trehy left the music industry altogether, but Mike Mason continues with musical endeavours. Currently, Mason works with music, film and photography, and has directed music videos for Spacemen 3, Spiritualized, Slowdive, and The Mekons. Some of Mason's other music projects include Cowboy Racer, which features Marijne van der Vlugt from Salad; writing and producing with artists including Boz Boorer, Lettie, Jessie Grace, Peter Murphy (Bauhaus); and Dalis Car proposed second album with Mick Karn. In 2014, Mason was working on a new project Superhand with Jessie Grace, Malt Barn recording have released a dubstep remix of the track "Discipline Me" by Rednek.

A collection of incomplete home recordings, titled Soft, was released digitally in May 2009 on the White Lines (communications) label.

Louise Trehy returned to music in March 2013, having posted three in-progress demos online: "Hang On", "Au Naturel" and "Stars".

Shortly after, she signed to Saint Marie Records—a Texas-based label that specializes in, but is not limited to, modern shoegaze and dream pop music. Working with Peter Pavli (Robert Calvert, Annette Peacock) as Strata Florida (meaning valley of the river of flowers) they released an album Made of Stars on 25 March 2014, which was well received; described as "...a full-throttle, Spectorish wall of sound pumped up to about 15. It’s as close to liturgical pop music as I’ve heard all year" 8.5/10.

They recently teased a 2026 release with 4AD through their Spotify Wrapped Artist Clip.

== Discography ==
=== Albums ===
- Blow (July 20, 1992; 4AD CAD 2010)
  1. "Lovesleep" – 4:57
  2. "Tastes Like Honey" – 4:39
  3. "Sugar Your Mind" – 4:02
  4. "Mensurral" – 4:04
  5. "Peekaboo" – 5:10
  6. "Lacuna" – 2:21
  7. "Oceans and Blue Skies" – 3:36
  8. "Follow Me Down" – 4:49
  9. "Halo" – 2:56
  10. "Cherry Stars Collide" – 3:44
  11. "Head in a Cave" – 6:36
- Blowback (Blow remixed and edited by the band – September 28, 1992; 4AD TAD 2015)
  1. "Oceans and Blue Skies" – 3:40
  2. "Head in a Cave" – 7:09
  3. "Tastes Like Honey" (Instrumental) – 3:58
  4. "Peekaboo" (Dub) – 3:41
  5. "Sugar Your Mind" – 4:26
  6. "Follow Me Down" (Excerpt) – 1:36
  7. "Mensurral" (Instrumental) – 5:08
  8. "Cherry Stars Collide" (Instrumental) – 5:30
- Soft (digital collection of 1994 home recordings – May 10, 2009; White Lines)
  1. "Holes" – 4:46
  2. "Hush" – 4:39
  3. "Just Another Feeling" – 4:08
  4. "Blood to Water (Rain on Me)" – 4:02
  5. "Tuneport" – 0:58
  6. "Thrill Me Skinny" – 5:02
  7. "Flooded" – 5:35
  8. "Watching the Sun" – 6:00
  9. "Julian" – 4:44
  10. "Heavenly" – 4:42
  11. "It's All Right" – 1:38
  12. "Hang Ups" – 5:30
  13. "Dear Mary" (Steve Miller cover) – 4:25

=== EPs ===
- Hush (June 19, 1994; Rough Trade R3223)
  1. "Hush" – 4:38
  2. "Flooded" – 6:39
  3. "Watching the Sun" – 5:26
  4. "Dear Mary" (Steve Miller cover) – 4:26

=== Compilations ===
Swallow tracks also appear on:

- "Lovesleep (vocal version)", Volume 4 compilation, 1992
- "Tastes Like Honey", "Follow Me Down", Lilliput compilation album, 1992
- "Oceans And Blue Skies" (video), 4AD Presents The 13 Year Itch compilation, 1993
- "Cherry Stars Collide", Joyride soundtrack, 1997
