= Hanna (soundtrack) =

2011 soundtrack album by The Chemical Brothers

- Digital download cover

Soundtrack album by The Chemical Brothers
- Released: 15 March 2011
- Recorded: Rowlands Audio Research (Sussex, England)
- Genre: Electronica
- Length: 50:01
- Label: Back Lot; Relativity; Sony Classical
- Producer: The Chemical Brothers

The Chemical Brothers chronology
Further (2010)	Hanna (2011)	Don't Think (2012)

Alternative cover

Hanna: Original Motion Picture Soundtrack is the soundtrack album to the 2011 British-German thriller film of the same name, directed by Joe Wright. The original score was composed by the English electronic music duo The Chemical Brothers. Initially, the album was only released digitally on 15 March 2011, but it was later released on CD on 4 July 2011.

NME ranked the album at number 54 in their list of the "61 of the Greatest Film Soundtracks".

== Singles ==
"Container Park" was released as a free download after the release of the initial download of Hanna and before the later CD release.

== Critical reception ==
Professional ratings
Aggregate scores
Source	Rating
Metacritic	65/100
Review scores
Source	Rating
AllMusic	3.5/5 stars
Consequence of Sound	4/5 stars
Empire	4/5 stars
IGN	(8.5/10)
Metro Times	(favorable)
Pitchfork	(6.2/10)
PopMatters	(5/10)
Slant Magazine	3/5 stars
Movie Music UK	1/5 stars

The soundtrack received mostly positive responses from music critics, with many praising The Chemical Brothers for having produced solid background music. However a few critics have cited a lack of experimentation as one of the flaws. According to Metacritic, which assigns a normalised rating out of 100 to reviews from mainstream critics, the album holds a score of 65, indicating "generally favorable reviews", based on seven reviews all compiled from critics. Chad Grischow of IGN reserved high praise for the soundtrack, feeling that the "duo nail the mix of violence and innocence".

== Track listing ==
No.	Title	Length
1.	"Hanna's Theme"	2:08
2.	"Escape 700"	5:16
3.	"Chalice 1"	0:47
4.	"The Devil Is in the Details"	3:22
5.	"Map Sounds / Chalice 2"	0:15
6.	"The Forest"	1:07
7.	"Quayside Synthesis"	1:21
8.	"The Sandman"	1:45
9.	"Marissa Flashback"	2:44
10.	"Bahnhof Rumble"	2:37
11.	"The Devil Is in the Beats"	2:34
12.	"Car Chase (Arp Worship)"	4:58
13.	"Interrogation / Lonesome Subway / Grimm's House"	4:25
14.	"Hanna vs Marissa"	1:46
15.	"Sun Collapse"	0:11
16.	"Special Ops"	1:28
17.	"Escape Wavefold"	3:21
18.	"Isolated Howl"	0:41
19.	"Container Park"	3:45
20.	"Hanna's Theme (Vocal Version)" (featuring Stephanie Dosen)	5:28
Total length:		50:01

== Chart performance ==
- No. 7 in the US Billboard Top Electronic Albums
- No. 11 in the US Billboard Top Soundtracks
