= Leave Home (song) =

1995 single by the Chemical Brothers

Single by The Chemical Brothers

from the album Exit Planet Dust
- B-side: "If You Kling to Me I'll Klong to You"
- Released: 5 June 1995
- Genre: Hard rock
- Length: 5:33
- Label: Virgin
- Songwriters: Tom Rowlands; Ed Simons
- Producer: The Chemical Brothers

The Chemical Brothers singles chronology
"Leave Home" (1995)	"Life Is Sweet" (1995)

"Leave Home" is a song by English big beat duo the Chemical Brothers, released in June 1995 by Virgin as the first single from their debut album, Exit Planet Dust (1995). The song reached number 17 on the UK Singles Chart and number one on the UK Dance Singles Chart.

== Background ==
"Leave Home" was used in the soundtracks to the video games SSX 3 and Wipeout 2097, and is also featured in the video game DJ Hero 2. The song was featured in the 2000 movies Gone in 60 Seconds and High Fidelity, as well as the 1997 film Dangerous Ground, the 1998 film The Acid House, the 1999 film Any Given Sunday, in episodes of The Real Hustle, and the 2022 film Jackass Forever.

The song originally appeared on the duo's first mix album, NME Xmas Dust Up, which was produced for the NME and covermount into their Christmas 1994 issue. This was when the duo were still known as the Dust Brothers.

The recurring lyric "the brother's gonna work it out" later led to the name of their 1998 mix album of the same name.

== Critical reception ==
Martin James from Melody Maker wrote, "'Leave Home' comes on like a fully loaded M-60 firing on a less than selective target." Amy Raphael from NME said, "The Chemical Brothers go for big hip-hop beats, howling sirens and persistent vocals reciting "Brothers gonna work it out"". Another NME editor, Stephen Dalton, stated, "Explore no further than current Top 20 hit "Leave Home" for shuddering Shaft basslines, bruisingly distorted breakbeats and choppy wah-wah trimmings."

== Track listings ==
=== CD ===
- UK, Europe, and US release
1. "Leave Home" – 5:33
2. "Leave Home" (Underworld mix) – 6:47
3. "Leave Home" (Sabres of Paradise mix) – 5:36
- US release (ASW 6167-2)
1. "Leave Home" – 5:33
2. "Leave Home" (Underworld mix one) – 8:52
3. "Leave Home" (Underworld mix two) – 6:46
4. "Leave Home" (Sabres of Paradise mix) – 5:37
- Japanese release
1. "Leave Home" – 5:33
2. "Leave Home" (Underworld mix I) – 8:53
3. "Leave Home" (Sabres of Paradise mix) – 5:36
4. "Life Is Sweet" – 6:33
5. "Life Is Sweet" (Daft Punk remix) – 8:37
6. "If You Kling to Me I'll Klong You" – 5:24

=== 12-inch vinyl ===
- UK version one
1. "Leave Home" – 5:33
2. "Leave Home" (Sabres of Paradise mix) – 5:36
3. "Let Me in Mate" – 4:21
- UK version two
1. "Leave Home" (Underworld mix II) – 8:53
2. "Leave Home" (Underworld mix) – 6:47

== Charts ==
Chart (1995)	Peak position
Scotland Singles (Official Charts)	18
UK Singles (Official Charts)	17
UK Dance (Official Charts)	1
