= The Golden Path (song) =

2003 single by the Chemical Brothers

Single by the Chemical Brothers featuring the Flaming Lips

from the album Singles 93–03
- B-side: "Nude Night"
- Released: 15 September 2003
- Length: 4:47
- Label: Freestyle Dust; Virgin; Astralwerks
- Songwriters: Tom Rowlands; Ed Simons; Wayne Michael Coyne; Steven Gregory Drozd
- Producer: The Chemical Brothers

The Chemical Brothers singles chronology
"Come with Us/The Test" (2002)	"The Golden Path" (2003)	"Get Yourself High" (2003)

The Flaming Lips singles chronology
"Fight Test" (2003)	"The Golden Path" (2003)	"The W.A.N.D. (The Will Always Negates Defeat)" (2006)

Music video
- "The Golden Path" on YouTube

"The Golden Path" is a song recorded by English electronic music duo the Chemical Brothers, taken from their first greatest hits album, Singles 93–03. Featuring the Flaming Lips, the lead vocals were performed by Wayne Coyne with Steven Drozd performing backing vocals. The song reached number 10 in Spain, number 17 in the United Kingdom, number 20 in Ireland, and number 32 in Italy.

== Production ==
Coyne said: "I love that band; they are one of the greatest inventions of our day." Coyne recalls about the recording process of his band's vocals: "We recorded our part very quickly, almost flippantly, like we'd get a second chance. Then Tom and Ed left a message within 20 minutes of receiving the tape. You could hear them jumping up and down in the background, shouting 'We're ecstatic.'"

== Critical response ==
Choosing it as one of album's best tracks, John Bush from AllMusic said the song "delivers on most of its promise as a soundclash for two of neo-psychedelia's most interesting acts" while calling it "a cool, crisp song" with two surprises: its reminiscence of Echo & the Bunnymen and Drozd's vocal debut.

More critical was Michaelangelo Matos of Spin, cited the track as possible evidence for a Chemical Brothers "decline into middlebrow irrelevance."

== Music video ==
The video was the first directorial work by American artist Chris Milk, involves a man (played by Fran Kranz) in a depressing grey office environment, dreaming of a more colorful world full of joy and dancing in the sunshine. It was shot at Los Angeles Center Studios.

The Chemical Brothers make a brief cameo appearance as conjoined twins commemorated on a wall of "employee of the month" plaques.

== Track listings ==
CD single

1. "The Golden Path" – 4:47
2. "Nude Night" – 6:18
3. "The Golden Path" (Ewan Pearson extended vocal) – 6:35

CD single (Japanese edition)

1. "The Golden Path" – 4:47
2. "Nude Night" – 6:18
3. "Piku Playground" (live) - 4:54
4. "The Golden Path" (Ewan Pearson extended vocal) – 6:35
5. "The Golden Path" (Ewan Pearson Rave Hell dub) - 6:56
6. "The Golden Path" (edit) - 4:00

DVD single

1. "The Golden Path" (music video)
2. "The Golden Path" (edit)
3. "Dexter's International Scribble mix"
4. "The Golden Path" (Ewan's Rave Hell dub)

12-inch single

1. "The Golden Path" – 4:47
2. "Nude Night" – 6:18

== Charts ==
Chart (2003)	Peak position
Australia (ARIA)	89
Ireland (IRMA)	20
Ireland Dance (IRMA)	1
Italy (FIMI)	32
Scottish Singles Sales (Official Charts)	16
Spain (Promusicae)	10
UK Singles (Official Charts)	17
UK Dance (Official Charts)	2

== Release history ==
Region	Date	Format(s)	Label(s)	Ref.
United States	8 September 2003	Alternative radio	Astralwerks; Virgin	
United Kingdom	15 September 2003	12-inch vinyl; CD; DVD	Freestyle Dust; Virgin	
Australia	22 September 2003	CD	Freestyle Dust; Virgin	
