= Do It Again (The Chemical Brothers song) =

2007 single by the Chemical Brothers

Single by the Chemical Brothers

from the album We Are the Night
- B-side: "No Need"; "Clip Kiss"
- Released: 18 June 2007
- Length: 5:37 (album version); 3:33 (radio edit)
- Label: Freestyle Dust; Virgin
- Songwriters: Tom Rowlands; Ed Simons; Alexander Williams
- Producer: The Chemical Brothers

The Chemical Brothers singles chronology
"The Boxer" (2005)	"Do It Again" (2007)	"The Salmon Dance" (2007)

Music video
- "Do It Again" on YouTube

"Do It Again" is a song by British electronic music duo the Chemical Brothers, included as the fifth track on their sixth studio album, We Are the Night (2007). The song features Ali Love and was released as the first single from the album on 18 June 2007 as a CD single. "Do It Again" peaked at number 12 on the UK Singles Chart and reached number two in Italy. The music video for the song was directed by Michael Haussman and is set in rural Morocco. The song was nominated at the 50th Grammy Awards for Best Dance Recording but lost out to Justin Timberlake's "LoveStoned / I Think That She Knows".

== Samples ==
Early versions of the song featured a sample of the song "On a Journey" by Elektrik Funk (the line "I sing the funk electric"). At last minute, it was dropped and replaced by "Let's turn this thing electric".

== Music video ==
The video for "Do It Again" is similar to that of Fatboy Slim's "Ya Mama" video, which includes a tape that causes uncontrollable dancing. It takes place in Morocco and is centred around a little boy and his older brother. The younger boy has a toothache and must have his tooth removed but he escapes with his brother, whom he begs not to let anyone take his tooth away. Whilst walking through the desert, a cassette tape falls from the sky. It is noteworthy that the writing on the tape is "Chemical Brothers" in Arabic, although the translation is not quite accurate. The brothers get a tape player and once they hit play, the music causes them to dance uncontrollably. As they bring it back home, they see that anyone who hears the music starts dancing too. By hitching rides on cars, motorcycles and on top of buses, they travel to a larger city into a market where they use the hypnotic music to help them steal money from a bank. With it they replace the boy's tooth with a golden one, and return home. It was directed by Michael Haussman.

=== Credits ===
- Directed by: Michael Haussman
- Directed of photography: Nicola Pecorini
- Production company: HSA Productions

== Track listings ==
UK CD

1. "Do It Again" (edit)
2. "Do It Again" (Oliver Huntemann remix) – 6:09

UK 7-inch (limited edition white vinyl)

1. "Do It Again" (edit)
2. "No Need"

UK 12-inch

1. "Do It Again" (extended mix)
2. "Clip Kiss"

European CD

1. "Do It Again" (edit)
2. "Do It Again" (Oliver Huntemann remix)
3. "No Need"

US CD

1. "Do It Again" (extended mix)
2. "Do It Again" (Oliver Huntemann remix)
3. "Do It Again" (Audion's House Arrest mix)
4. "Clip Kiss"
5. "No Need"

US 12-inch

1. "Do It Again" (extended mix)
2. "Clip Kiss"
3. "Do It Again" (Audion's House Arrest mix)

US iTunes and Napster

1. "Do It Again"
2. "Do It Again" (extended mix)
3. "Do It Again" (Oliver Huntemann remix)
4. "Clip Kiss"

== Charts ==
=== Weekly charts ===
Chart (2007)	Peak position
Austria (Ö3 Austria Top 40)	59
Belgium (Ultratop 50 Flanders)	8
Belgium (Ultratop 50 Wallonia)	29
Europe (Eurochart Hot 100)	19
Germany (GfK)	65
Italy (FIMI)	2
Netherlands (Single Top 100)	26
Scotland Singles (OCC)	7
Spain (Promusicae)	3
Switzerland (Schweizer Hitparade)	86
UK Singles (OCC)	12
UK Dance (OCC)	1

=== Year-end charts ===
Chart (2007)	Position
Italy (FIMI)	38
