= Further (The Chemical Brothers album) =

Studio album by the Chemical Brothers
- Released: 14 June 2010
- Studio: Orinoco (South London, England); Rowlands Audio Research (Sussex, England)
- Genre: Electronica; psychedelia; progressive house
- Length: 51:56
- Label: Freestyle Dust; Parlophone (UK) Astralwerks (US)
- Producer: The Chemical Brothers

The Chemical Brothers chronology
Brotherhood (2008)	Further (2010)	Hanna (2011)

Singles from Further
- 1. "Escape Velocity" Released: 19 April 2010; 2. "Swoon" Released: 9 May 2010; 3. "Another World" Released: 16 August 2010

Professional ratings
Aggregate scores
Source	Rating
Metacritic	70/100
Review scores
Source	Rating
AllMusic	2.5/5 stars
Alternative Press	3.5/5 stars
The A.V. Club	B+
Drowned in Sound	7/10
Mojo	4/5 stars
musicOMH	4/5 stars
NME	7/10
Pitchfork	8.0/10
Q	4/5 stars
Rolling Stone	3/5 stars

Further is the seventh studio album by the English electronic duo the Chemical Brothers, released on 14 June 2010. The album title and release date were announced on the band's official website on 30 March 2010.

Further was marketed as their first album not to feature any guest collaborations. Though there are no guest collaborations on the album in the traditional sense, Further features Stephanie Dosen on vocals and Bruce Woolley on theremin as session musicians. Tom Rowlands sang himself on certain tracks.

The album was the duo's first on Parlophone, ending fourteen years of releases on Virgin, although both labels are owned by EMI.

Although it charted in many other countries, the album was excluded from the UK charts because British chart regulations forbid prizes being used as enticements to buy albums, and all formats of Further included a competition to win an iPad.

In the United States, the album debuted at No. 63 on Billboard 200, No. 3 on Top Dance/Electronic Albums, and No. 15 on Top Rock Albums, selling 7,000 copies in its first week. The album has sold 40,000 copies in the United States as of June 2015.

== Background ==
All eight tracks from the album were accompanied by corresponding films, made specifically to match them, by Adam Smith and Marcus Lyall. The main character of the films is portrayed by actress Romola Garai. The woman on the album cover is aquatic athlete Jenny Miller (née Godding), who also body doubled for the underwater portions of the music videos.

The album, along with its visuals, was released as a bonus DVD on deluxe edition, as an iTunes LP, and as an iTunes Pass feature in US only. As a part of the iTunes Pass program, those who purchased it received an unreleased track, named "Pourquoi", on 29 June 2010. The standard edition was released on CD, containing just the eight-track album.

Further was nominated for Best Electronic/Dance Album at the 2011 Grammy Awards, but lost to La Roux's self-titled debut album.

A number of its tracks were used in the media. The bonus track "Don't Think" was featured in the 2010 film Black Swan, in an altered form. The track "Dissolve" was featured as a playlist on the 2012 video game Lumines Electronic Symphony. The track "Snow" was featured in the 2015 film American Ultra. The track "Swoon" was featured as interface music in the 2011 video game PES 2012. The track "Escape Velocity" was featured in the 2010 video game Gran Turismo 5.

== Track listing ==
No.	Title	Length
1.	"Snow"	5:07
2.	"Escape Velocity"	11:57
3.	"Another World"	5:40
4.	"Dissolve"	6:21
5.	"Horse Power"	5:51
6.	"Swoon"	6:05
7.	"K+D+B"	5:39
8.	"Wonders of the Deep"	5:12
Total length:		51:56

Digital download and Japanese CD bonus track
No.	Title	Length
9.	"Don't Think"	7:44
Total length:		59:40

iTunes Pass bonus track (U.S. only)
No.	Title	Length
9.	"Pourquoi"	6:02
Total length:		57:58

== Personnel ==
- The Chemical Brothers – production

=== Additional musicians ===
- Bruce Woolley – theremin
- Steve Dub – mixing, engineering
- Stephanie Dosen – additional vocals
- Adam Smith – art direction
- Tom Hingston Studio – design
- Mike Marsh – mastering
- Lawrence Aldridge – editing assistant
- Jez Tozer – photography
- Cheeky Paul – editing

== Singles ==
1. "Escape Velocity" was released on 12 April 2010 as a vinyl-only single. It did not chart in the UK charts.
2. "Swoon" was released on 9 June 2010. It reached No. 85 in the UK charts.
3. "Another World" was released as download on 16 August 2010.
4. Also available as downloads are "Swoon" (Boys Noize Summer remix), "Swoon" (Lindstrøm and Prins Thomas remix) and "Horse Power" (Popof remix).
5. "Horse Power" was released in 2010 as a promo DJ single. It did not chart in the UK charts.

== Charts ==
Chart (2010)	Peak position
Australian Albums (ARIA)	9
Austrian Albums Chart	48
Belgian Albums Chart	21
Dutch Albums Chart	42
French Digital Albums Chart	12
French Albums Chart	34
German Albums Chart	35
Greek Albums Chart	2
New Zealand Albums Chart	19
Polish Albums Chart	23
Swedish Albums Chart	56
Swiss Albums Chart	5
Spanish Albums Chart	28
US Billboard 200	63
US Top Alternative Albums (Billboard)	7
US Top Dance Albums (Billboard)	3
US Top Rock Albums (Billboard)	15
US Indie Store Album Sales (Billboard)	15
