= Hey Boy Hey Girl =

1999 single by the Chemical Brothers

Single by the Chemical Brothers

from the album Surrender
- B-side: "Flashback"; "Scale"
- Released: 26 May 1999
- Studio: Orinoco (South London, England)
- Genre: Dance
- Length: 4:50
- Label: Freestyle Dust; Virgin
- Songwriters: Tom Rowlands; Ed Simons; Gregory Carlton Wigfall; Richard Lee Fowler; Charles Pettiford; Celite Evans; Jerry Bloodrock
- Producer: The Chemical Brothers

The Chemical Brothers singles chronology
"Only 4 the K People" (1999)	"Hey Boy Hey Girl" (1999)	"Let Forever Be" (1999)

Music video
- "Hey Boy Hey Girl" on YouTube

"Hey Boy Hey Girl" is a song by the British big beat duo the Chemical Brothers. The song contains a sample from "The Roof Is on Fire" by Rock Master Scott & the Dynamic Three, but the actual sample is taken from Armand van Helden's 1992 track "I Can't Wait (House Head & B-Boy Collaboration Mix)", as the riff at 11 seconds into "I Can't Wait" is also sampled in "Hey Boy Hey Girl" at the beginning. "Hey Boy Hey Girl" was released as the first single from the Chemical Brothers' third studio album, Surrender (1999), on 26 May 1999 in Japan and on 31 May in the United Kingdom. The song peaked at number three on the UK Singles Chart in June 1999 and remained on the chart for 10 weeks. It also reached the top 10 in Canada, Finland, Iceland, Ireland, New Zealand, Norway and Spain.

== Critical reception ==
Daily Record commented, "Ed Simons and Tom Rowlands are back with another fantastic dance single. It's another block rockin' hit." In October 2011, NME placed it at number 50 on its list "150 Best Tracks of the Past 15 Years", writing that the song "[starts] with a menacing, trance laden groove" and "[builds] to an absolute dance stomper".

== Music video ==
The music video (directed by Dom and Nic) opens with a group of schoolchildren on board a coach. The camera focuses on a young girl who opens a medical book of pictures of the human skeleton. A blond boy spits on the page, then smiles at her as he walks away. The children go to the Natural History Museum, where the same boy tries to scare the girl with a skull in his hood. She chases him, but falls near the bottom of a flight of stairs and fractures her wrist. At the hospital, she gets an X-ray of her hand.

The video then shows her brushing her teeth whilst picturing herself as only bones. The background behind her morphs into a toilet area at the Ministry of Sound nightclub, South London. When she reverts into a person, she is older (played by Hanne Klintøe). She passes a couple having sex in a stall, but she only sees them as skeletons. She exits the toilets and heads to the nightclub's bar, where a man (uncredited appearance of Rick Warden) tries to talk with her. She then pictures him as a skeleton and feels his jawbone before leaving. She then goes to the dance floor, and sees all the clubbers dancing as skeletons.

She exits the nightclub, and the Chemical Brothers themselves make a brief cameo appearance, stepping out of a taxi with DJ equipment. She then steps into that same taxi, where she sees the driver as a skeleton. He then asks her 'Where you going, baby?' in a camp, droll voice.

== Track listings ==
Standard CD and cassette single

1. "Hey Boy Hey Girl" – 4:48
2. "Flashback" – 5:18
3. "Scale" – 3:43

Standard 12-inch single

1. "Hey Boy Hey Girl" (extended version) – 6:01
2. "Flashback" – 5:18
3. "Scale" – 3:43

European CD single

1. "Hey Boy Hey Girl" (radio edit) – 3:32
2. "Flashback" – 5:18

== Credits and personnel ==
Credits are lifted from the Surrender album booklet.

Studios

- Recorded at Orinoco Studios (South London, England)
- Edited at Berwick Street Studios (London, England)
- Mastered at The Exchange (London, England)

Personnel

- The Chemical Brothers – production
  - Tom Rowlands – writing
  - Ed Simons – writing
- Gregory Carlton Wigfall – writing
- Richard Lee Fowler – writing
- Charles Pettiford – writing
- Celite Evans – writing
- Jerry Bloodrock – writing
- Steve Dub – engineering
- Cheeky Paul – editing
- Mike Marsh – mastering

== Charts ==
=== Weekly charts ===
Chart (1999)	Peak position
Australia (ARIA)	25
Belgium (Ultratop 50 Flanders)	23
Belgium (Ultratop 50 Wallonia)	18
Canada (Nielsen SoundScan)	3
Canada Dance/Urban (RPM)	6
Europe (Eurochart Hot 100)	11
Finland (Suomen virallinen lista)	8
France (SNEP)	77
Germany (GfK)	41
Greece (IFPI)	7
Iceland (Íslenski Listinn Topp 40)	5
Ireland (IRMA)	4
Italy (Musica e dischi)	13
Netherlands (Dutch Top 40)	25
Netherlands (Single Top 100)	29
New Zealand (Recorded Music NZ)	10
Norway (VG-lista)	9
Scottish Singles Sales (Official Charts)	2
Spain (Promusicae)	5
Sweden (Sverigetopplistan)	14
UK Singles (Official Charts)	3
UK Dance (Official Charts)	1
US Dance Singles Sales (Billboard)	12

=== Year-end charts ===
Chart (1999)	Position
Belgium (Ultratop 50 Flanders)	93
Belgium (Ultratop 50 Wallonia)	94
Netherlands (Dutch Top 40)	179
Sweden (Hitlistan)	91
UK Singles (OCC)	74

== Certifications ==
Region	Certification	Certified units/sales
Australia (ARIA)	Platinum	70,000^{‡}
Italy (FIMI)	Gold	50,000^{‡}
New Zealand (RMNZ)	Platinum	30,000^{‡}
United Kingdom (BPI)	Platinum	600,000^{‡}
^{‡} Sales+streaming figures based on certification alone.

== Release history ==
Region	Date	Format	Label(s)	Catalogue	Ref.
Japan	26 May 1999	CD	Freestyle Dust; Virgin	VJCP-12125	
United Kingdom	31 May 1999	CD	Freestyle Dust; Virgin	CHEMSD8	
United Kingdom	31 May 1999	12-inch vinyl	Freestyle Dust; Virgin	CHEMST8	
United Kingdom	31 May 1999	Cassette	Freestyle Dust; Virgin	CHEMSC8	
Canada	1 June 1999	CD	Virgin	—N/a	
United States	22 February 2000	Alternative radio	Astralwerks; Freestyle Dust	—N/a	
