= Swoon (song) =

Single by The Chemical Brothers

from the album Further
- Released: 9 May 2010
- Genre: Electronic
- Length: 3:06 (radio edit); 6:05 (album version)
- Label: Parlophone; Virgin
- Songwriters: Tom Rowlands; Ed Simons
- Producer: The Chemical Brothers

The Chemical Brothers singles chronology
"Escape Velocity" (2010)	"Swoon" (2010)	"Another World" (2010)

Music video
- "Swoon" on YouTube

"Swoon" is a song by The Chemical Brothers, released as the first official single from their 2010 album Further. The song was played on a few occasions by The Chemical Brothers prior to its release in their DJ sets. On 6 May 2010, an official video of the radio edit was uploaded on Parlophone's official YouTube page for the single. The radio edit of Swoon was released as a digital download on iTunes on 9 May 2010. The song entered at number 100 in the UK Singles Chart, the lowest chart position the band has had to date, until it re-entered the charts shortly after at number 88 and again at number 85. Before the song appeared on Further, it appeared on a free CD which came in The Times newspaper; on 16 May 2010. The untitled CD is often called simply The Chemical Brothers – however, only the radio edit was featured.

The Boys Noize remix of "Swoon" featured on the soundtrack of Pro Evolution Soccer 2012.

== Track listing ==
1. "Swoon (radio edit)" – 3:06

== Music video ==
The music video for the "Swoon" was directed by the duo's long time collaborator Adam Smith and Marcus Lyall and produced by the US branch of Black Dog Films and RSA Films.

The video features a female and a male figure against a black background while various separate videos play inside their silhouettes. Throughout the video they can be seen running, jumping, and falling down. At the end of the video, the two figures come together.

The video is a combination of elements taken from the visuals for "Swoon" and "Dissolve" in the album's accompanying film.

Gavin Free stated on episode 215 of the Rooster Teeth podcast that he worked on the music video.

== Chart performance ==
"Swoon" debuted on the UK Dance Chart on 16 May 2010 at number 13, before falling to number 27 the following week. On 30 May 2010, the single fell to number 30, before climbing to number 22 on its fourth week in the chart. Upon release of the album, "Swoon" climbed to its current peak of number 12 as well as re-entering at number 88 on the UK Singles Chart.

Weekly chart performance for "Swoon"
Chart (2010)	Peak position
Belgium (Ultratip Bubbling Under Flanders)	22
Japan Hot 100 (Billboard Japan)	17
Mexican Ingles Airplay (Billboard)	18
UK Singles (OCC)	85
UK Dance (OCC)	12
US Dance Club Songs (Billboard)	45

Annual chart rankings for "Swoon"
Chart (2010)	Rank
Japan Adult Contemporary (Billboard)	45
