= We Are the Night (album) =

- Original cover art.

Studio album by the Chemical Brothers
- Released: 2 July 2007
- Recorded: 2006
- Genre: Electronica
- Length: 59:51
- Labels: Freestyle Dust; Virgin (UK) Astralwerks (US)
- Producer: The Chemical Brothers

The Chemical Brothers chronology
Push the Button (2005)	We Are the Night (2007)	Brotherhood (2008)

Alternative cover art
- Cover art on reissued editions.

Singles from We Are the Night
- 1. "Do It Again" Released: 18 June 2007; 2. "The Salmon Dance" Released: 10 September 2007

We Are the Night is the sixth studio album by English electronic music duo the Chemical Brothers, released on 2 July 2007 by Freestyle Dust and Virgin in the UK, and 17 July by Astralwerks in the US.

The record entered the UK Albums Chart at number 1, becoming the band's fifth consecutive album to top the chart, and debuted at number 65 on the Billboard 200. It was certified gold by the British Phonographic Industry.

The album won a Grammy Award for Best Electronic/Dance Album at the 50th Grammy Awards.

== Background ==
In June 2006, it was announced on their official website that the Chemical Brothers were working on material for a new album, then-codenamed "Chemical 6". Ed Simons of the duo was also quoted as saying that they would hope to "put a battle weapon out for the summer", a reference to their Electronic Battle Weapon series on white label.

"Electronic Battle Weapon 8" and "Electronic Battle Weapon 9" debuted on Pete Tong's BBC Radio 1 show on 8 December 2006. The two tracks were later released as a double A-sided vinyl record prior to the Chemical Brothers' New Year's Eve appearance at Turnmills in London. A version of "Electronic Battle Weapon 8" is featured on the We Are the Night album under the title "Saturate". At the same Turnmills appearance, the duo debuted a track at midnight to welcome the new year. This track was eventually released as "Burst Generator", found on the album.

The Chemical Brothers officially announced We Are the Night at their MySpace page on 21 March 2007. It suffered a delay in release due to an issue during production of the artwork. An online "old-skool" Chemical Brothers computer game by EMI was subsequently released as an apology.

The album cover art was inspired by "Lonely Metropolitan" by Herbert Bayer. Reissues of the album omit the influenced artwork from the cover.

== Structure ==
Used throughout the album is the classic technique of sampling the Chemical Brothers used on other albums. For example, the song "We Are the Night" uses a direct sample from "The Sunshine Underground" from Surrender. The album also includes a sample of a reading of Ode to D.A. Levy by Bill Bissett.

== Singles ==
"Saturate" was released in 2006 as "Electronic Battle Weapon 8" exclusively for DJs to use in clubs. "Do It Again" was released on 18 June 2007. It reached number 12 on the UK Singles Chart. "The Salmon Dance" was released on 10 September 2007 and reached number 27 in the UK. "Battle Scars" was released as a download in remix form in late 2007. Subtitled "Beyond the Wizard's Sleeve Re-Animation". It is also a double A-side with the "Heavily Smoked by the Glimmers" remix of "The Salmon Dance".

== Reception ==
Professional ratings
Aggregate scores
Source	Rating
Metacritic	67/100
Review scores
Source	Rating
AllMusic	3/5 stars
Alternative Press	4/5 stars
The A.V. Club	B−
Chicago Tribune	1.5/4 stars
Entertainment Weekly	B+
The Guardian	4/5 stars
Pitchfork	3.8/10
PopMatters	8/10
Uncut	4/5 stars
Under the Radar	7/10

The album has a score of 67 out of 100 on Metacritic, indicating "generally favorable reviews". URB gave the album four stars out of five and said, "If we're to accuse Chemical Brothers of anything, it's trying to set a lofty new bar in the style they themselves created, and that no one else seems to be working anymore." BBC Collective also gave the album four stars out of five and said, "Rather than play catch-up, the Chems are accentuating the difference, digging deeper into melody instead of piling on the noise." Billboard gave it a favourable review and said that when the album "opens with a cataclysm of "Transformers" noises, it signals a record that's a little more unapologetically electronic than their previous ones." Spin gave it a score of seven out of ten and stated that "Tom Rowlands and Ed Simons continue to smear psychedelic synth cheese and stereophonic airplane noises over chewy grooves that veer closer and closer to straight disco."

Other reviews are pretty average, mixed or negative: NME gave it a score of six out of ten and stated that the song "All Rights Reversed" saved the album "from sounding like it's still stuck in the mid-'90s and with Willy Mason and Midlake cropping up, Tom and Ed have again found just enough cool mates to save them from a general feeling of naffness." Yahoo! Music UK gave the album six stars out of ten and said it "feels bloated and ornate amongst the elegant functionalism of post-millennial club music." Drowned in Sound also gave it a score of six out of ten and said, "While there are moments that have the summer days – and daze – of '99 flooding back, too much of this sixth long-player proper sounds disjointed and manhandled." musicOMH gave it three stars out of five and stated: "While you may know what you're getting with a Chemical Brothers album, they remain damn good at what they do.... You get the impression that their next album may have to be a bit more adventurous if they're to survive." Now also gave it three stars out of five and said that it was "quickly evident... that the Chemical Brothers are making a serious go at being contemporary.... They pull it off relatively well for the most part." Prefix Magazine gave it an average review and said that "Tom Rowlands and Ed Simons pull out all their tricks, delivering an album of euphoric psychedelic electronica, quirky guest appearances, and danceable grooves."

Slant Magazine gave it a score of two-and-a-half stars out of five and said that the album, "like most high school reunions, fails to kick-start anything other than nostalgia." Stylus Magazine, however, gave it a D and said that the album "isn’t awful, but you can hear the rigidity of its formula, like the motorik title tune that burps up its eponymy every few seconds along a signless, moody highway."

== Track listing ==
No.	Title	Writer(s)	Length
1.	"No Path to Follow"	Tom Rowlands; Ed Simons; Willy Mason	1:04
2.	"We Are the Night"	Rowlands; Simons; Bill Bissett; Riz Ortolani	6:33
3.	"All Rights Reversed"	Rowland; Simons; Dev Hynes; James Righton; Jamie Reynolds	4:42
4.	"Saturate"	Rowland; Simons	4:49
5.	"Do It Again"	Rowland; Simons; Ali Love	5:33
6.	"Das Spiegel"	Rowland; Simons	5:51
7.	"The Salmon Dance"	Rowland; Simons; Derrick Stewart	3:40
8.	"Burst Generator"	Rowland; Simons	6:51
9.	"A Modern Midnight Conversation"	Rowland; Simons; Barbara Massey; Ernie Calabria	5:56
10.	"Battle Scars"	Rowland; Simons; Mason	5:50
11.	"Harpoons"	Rowland; Simons	2:25
12.	"The Pills Won't Help You Now"	Rowland; Simons; Tim Smith	6:35
Total length:			59:51

Japanese CD and iTunes bonus tracks
No.	Title	Writer(s)	Length
13.	"Seal"	Rowland; Simons; Molina	4:40
14.	"No Need"	Rowland; Simons	5:14
Total length:			69:45

UK, US, and Japanese iTunes bonus tracks
No.	Title	Writer(s)	Length
13.	"Seal" (featuring Juana Molina)	Rowland; Simons; Juana Molina	4:40
14.	"The Rock Drill"	Rowland; Simons	5:09
Total length:			69:40

== Charts ==
=== Weekly charts ===
Chart (2007)	Peak position
Australian Albums (ARIA)	18
Austrian Albums (Ö3 Austria)	18
Belgian Albums (Ultratop Flanders)	3
Belgian Albums (Ultratop Wallonia)	21
Dutch Albums (Album Top 100)	17
French Albums (SNEP)	28
German Albums (Offizielle Top 100)	28
Hungarian Albums (MAHASZ)	13
Italian Albums (FIMI)	6
Mexican Albums (AMPROFON)	88
New Zealand Albums (RMNZ)	19
Polish Albums (OLiS)	47
Scottish Albums (Official Charts)	2
Spanish Albums (Promusicae)	26
Swiss Albums (Schweizer Hitparade)	6
UK Albums (Official Charts)	1
UK Dance Albums (Official Charts)	1
US Billboard 200	65
US Top Dance Albums (Billboard)	1

=== Year-end charts ===
Chart (2007)	Position
Belgian Albums (Ultratop Flanders)	78
UK Albums (OCC)	133
US Top Dance/Electronic Albums (Billboard)	19

== Certifications ==
Region	Certification	Certified units/sales
Ireland (IRMA)	Gold	7,500^{^}
Russia (NFPF)	Gold	10,000^{*}
United Kingdom (BPI)	Gold	100,000^{^}
^{*} Sales figures based on certification alone.^{^} Shipments figures based on certification alone.
