= The Chemical Brothers =

British electronic music duo

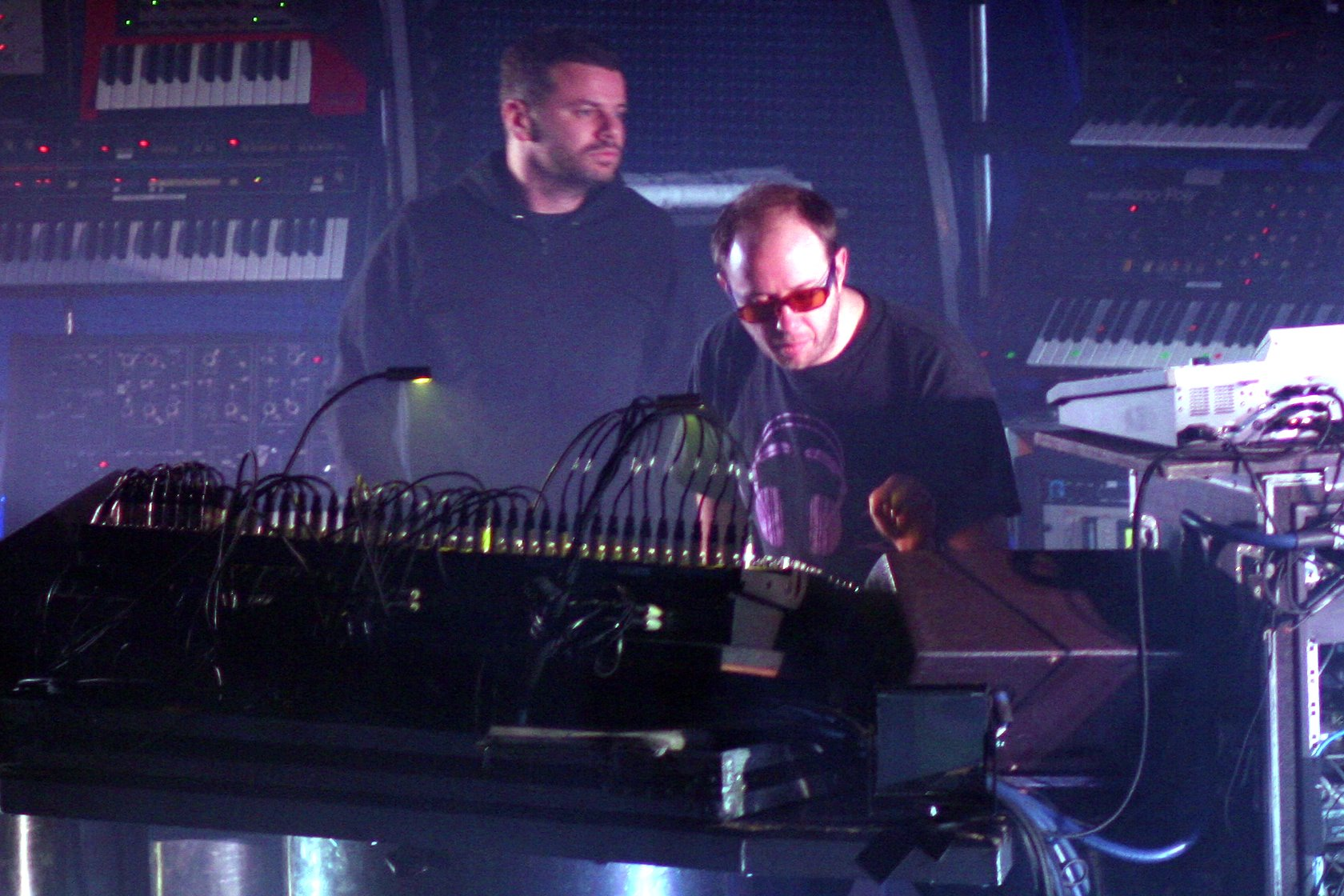
- Simons (left) and Rowlands (right) in 2007

Background information
- Also known as: The Dust Brothers (1992–1995); Chemical Bros.
- Origin: Manchester, England
- Genres: Electronic; big beat; techno; house
- Years active: 1992–present
- Labels: Junior Boy's Own; Astralwerks; Freestyle Dust; Virgin; Ultra
- Spinoffs: Tomora
- Members: Ed Simons; Tom Rowlands
- Website: thechemicalbrothers.com
- Logo

The Chemical Brothers are an English electronic music duo formed by Ed Simons and Tom Rowlands in Manchester in 1992. They were pioneers in bringing the big beat genre to the forefront of pop culture.

Originally known as The Dust Brothers, they took the name The Chemical Brothers in order to avoid confusion with a similarly named US production duo, Dust Brothers. Their first album Exit Planet Dust (the title referencing their recent name change) sold over one million copies and debuted at No. 9 on the UK Albums Chart. After signing to Virgin Records, the duo achieved critical acclaim with their second and third albums Dig Your Own Hole (1997) and Surrender (1999), which both topped the UK albums chart. Their subsequent albums, Come with Us (2003), Push the Button (2005) and We Are The Night (2007) all reached number one and further expanded their sound with neo-psychedelia, house, and pop influences.

Across their career, they have collaborated with numerous guest vocalists, including Noel Gallagher, Beth Orton, Bernard Sumner, Q-Tip, St. Vincent, Beck, and Aurora; the last of these has further collaborated with Rowlands to form supergroup Tomora.

With 13 top-20 singles in the UK, including "Setting Sun" and "Block Rockin' Beats" which both reached number one, they have won six Grammy Awards, including Best Rock Instrumental Performance for "Block Rockin' Beats", Best Dance Recording for "Galvanize", and Best Dance/Electronic Album for No Geography (2018).

== History ==
=== 1984–1995: Formation and early incarnations ===
Ed Simons (born 9 June 1970) was born to a barrister mother and a father he described as "absent". After attending Dulwich College, where he gained 11 O levels and three A levels, he studied history at the University of Manchester.

Tom Rowlands (born 11 January 1971) was raised in Henley-on-Thames and attended Reading Blue Coat School. He met Simons at the University of Manchester in 1989; they shared an interest in raves and club-going. Rowlands chose Manchester primarily to immerse himself in its music scene, particularly the Fac 51 Hacienda.

Rowlands was in a band called Ariel prior to meeting Simons, with friends Brendan Melck and Mathew Berry; the band was signed to Echo Logik Records and then deConstruction. After the band disbanded, Rowlands and Simons, who were sharing a house, started to DJ in 1992, at a club called Naked Under Leather, located in the back of a pub called the Swinging Sporran (later renamed Retro Bar and currently operated by the University of Manchester). They were known by the alias "237 Turbo Nutters", after the number of their house on Dickenson Road in Manchester and a reference to their Blackburn raving days. The pair would play hip hop, techno, and house. The two called themselves The Dust Brothers after the US production duo Dust Brothers, famous for their work with the Beastie Boys. After a while, Rowlands and Simons began to run out of suitable instrumental hip hop tracks to use, so they started to make their own. Using a Hitachi hi-fi system, an Atari ST, a sampler, and a keyboard, they recorded "Song to the Siren", which sampled This Mortal Coil. "Song to the Siren" was released on their own record label, which they called Diamond Records (after Ed's nickname). At this point the Dust Brothers were the first-ever backroom DJs in the Sumptuous Locarno Lounge at The Job Club in Gossips night club in Dean Street, Soho from April 1992 till April 1993.

In October 1992, they pressed 500 white label copies and took them to dance-record shops around London, but all refused to play it, saying it was too slow (the track played at 111 BPM). They sent a copy to London DJ Andrew Weatherall, who made it a permanent fixture in his DJ sets. In May 1993 Steven Hall signed the duo and Junior Boy's Own released "Song to the Siren".

Around June 1993, the Dust Brothers recorded their first remixes. The first was "Packet of Peace" for Justin Robertson's Lionrock group, followed by songs from Leftfield, Republica, and the Sandals. Later in 1993, Rowlands and Simons completed work on their Fourteenth Century Sky EP, released in January 1994. It contained the groundbreaking "Chemical Beats", which epitomised the duo's genre-defining big beat sound. The EP also contained "One Too Many Mornings", which for the first time showed their less intense, more chilled-out side. Both "One Too Many Mornings" and "Chemical Beats" would later appear on their debut album. Fourteenth Century Sky was followed later in 1994 by the My Mercury Mouth EP. "Chemical Beats" was also part of the soundtrack for the first edition of the Wipeout video game series, having been featured in Wipeout for the PlayStation in 1995.

In October 1994, the Dust Brothers became resident DJs at the small but influential Heavenly Sunday Social Club at the Albany pub in London's Great Portland Street. Noel Gallagher, Paul Weller, James Dean Bradfield, and Tim Burgess were regular visitors. The Dust Brothers were subsequently asked to remix tracks by Manic Street Preachers and the Charlatans, plus Primal Scream's "Jailbird" and the Prodigy's "Voodoo People". These two remixes received television exposure, being playlisted by MTV Europe's "The Party Zone" in 1995.

In March 1995, the Dust Brothers began their first international tour, which included the United States – where they played with Orbital and Underworld – then a series of European festivals. Also around this time, objections were filed by the original Dust Brothers over the use of their name, and so Rowlands and Simons had to decide on a new name. They decided to call themselves the Chemical Brothers after "Chemical Beats".

In June 1995, they released their fourth single, the first under their new identity. "Leave Home" was released on Junior Boy's Own, as a preview of the imminent debut album and became the band's first chart hit, peaking at No. 17.

=== 1995–1998: Exit Planet Dust and Dig Your Own Hole ===
In June 1995, the Chemical Brothers released their debut album Exit Planet Dust (the title inspired by their name change) on Junior Boy's Own. It debuted on the UK chart at No. 9, and featured guest vocalist Beth Orton on the song "Alive Alone". It eventually went on to sell over a million copies worldwide, and was used on the soundtrack of the science fiction TV series pilot Virtuality. Shortly after its release, the Chemical Brothers signed to Virgin Records, to which they took their own offshoot label, Freestyle Dust. For their next single, "Life Is Sweet", released in August 1995, they again used a guest vocalist, featuring their friend Tim Burgess, singer of the Charlatans. It reached No. 25 in the UK singles chart. The single was also Select magazine's "Single of the Month" for October. The release included a Daft Punk remix of "Life Is Sweet".

In October 1995, the duo returned to the Heavenly Sunday Social for a second and final run of DJ dates. They then became residents of Heavenly Social on Saturdays at Turnmills and also in Liquid Rooms in Tokyo. In November, the Chemical Brothers played the Astoria Theatre in London. The duo also supported The Prodigy in December on dates at Brixton Academy and in Blackpool.

In January 1996, Exit Planet Dust was certified gold. The Chemical Brothers released their first new material in six months on Virgin, the Loops of Fury EP. The four-track release was limited to 20,000 copies, but is now available for digital download. It entered the UK chart at No. 13. NME described the lead track as "splashing waves of synths across hard-hitting beats". The EP also contained a Dave Clarke remix of "Chemical Beats", and two other new tracks, "Get Up on It Like This" and "(The Best Part Of) Breaking Up".

In February 1996, Select magazine published a list of the 100 best albums of the 1990s thus far. Exit Planet Dust was listed at Number 39. In August 1996, the Chemical Brothers supported Oasis at Knebworth, where 125,000 people attended each of the two shows.

During the 1995 Glastonbury Festival, Noel Gallagher had told them how much he liked Exit Planet Dust, and asked if he could sing on a future track, similar to the way Tim Burgess had worked on "Life Is Sweet". They did not think much of the offer at the time, given how busy Gallagher would be with the release of Oasis' (What's the Story) Morning Glory?, plus the complexities of dealing with each other's record companies. However, the duo later worked on a track they thought would benefit from a vocal. They sent Gallagher a tape of what they had done so far. He worked on it overnight, and left a message early next morning that he was ready to record it. The track was called "Setting Sun" and was finally released in September 1996. It entered the UK chart at the top, giving the duo their first ever No. 1 single. "Setting Sun" was backed by a longer instrumental version, and also a new track "Buzz Tracks", which was not much more than a DJ tool.

In 1996, Live at the Social Volume 1 was released by Heavenly Records, which became the Chemical Brothers' first mix CD (excluding Xmas Dust Up, a free album that came in a 1994 issue of NME). It was also the duo's first live album (excluding the EP Live 05)

The Chemical Brothers headlined the Organic '96 Music Festival in the USA on 22 June 1996 at the Snow Valley Ski Resort in Running Springs, California.

In March 1997, the Chemical Brothers released the second track from their forthcoming album. "Block Rockin' Beats" contained a Schoolly D vocal sample and re-working of the bass-line from 23 Skidoo's single "Coup". The NME named it "Single of the Week" and said: "It throbs like your head might if you had just done a length underwater in a swimming pool full of amyl." It later won them a Grammy Award for Best Rock Instrumental Performance.

In the US at this time, "Setting Sun" was sitting at Number 80 in the Billboard Hot 100, after selling around 80,000 copies. Sales from Exit Planet Dust were also around 150,000.

On 7 April 1997, the Chemical Brothers released their second album, Dig Your Own Hole. It was recorded at the band's own south London studio, with the title taken from graffiti on the wall outside. The album was well received, with Mixmag rating it 10/10 and calling it "mad enough to be thrilling, slick enough for not even remotely trendy coffee tables".

During the summer of 1997, the Chemical Brothers toured extensively, particularly in the United States. In August, the Chemical Brothers achieved a rapprochement with the US Dust Brothers, and asked them to remix the forthcoming single "Elektrobank". They themselves also became highly sought after for remixes for other artists. In September, the next single from Dig Your Own Hole, "Elektrobank" was released. In November, the pair played at Dublin's Point Theatre, with support from Carl Cox. They also began a US tour in Detroit.

At the end of the year, Dig Your Own Hole's final track, the nine-minute-long "The Private Psychedelic Reel", gave rise to a limited-edition mini-EP of the same name. The B-side consisted of a live version of "Setting Sun", recorded at the Lowlands Festival, Netherlands on 24 August 1997. Also in December, following four sold-out US shows, the Chemical Brothers toured the UK, concluding in a sold-out show at Brixton Academy, London.

In 1998, they concentrated more on DJing, although some remixes did see the light of day, including "I Think I'm in Love" from Spiritualized. Both a vocal remix and an instrumental remix were included in the single release. Each clocked in at over seven-and-a-half minutes. Another remix completed by the Chemical Brothers was "Delta Sun Bottleneck Stomp" by Mercury Rev. This was another extension in the association between the two bands, since Mercury Rev's Jonathon Donahue contributed to "The Private Psychedelic Reel" on Dig Your Own Hole.

In September 1998, a second mix album, Brothers Gonna Work It Out, was released. It contains some of their own tracks and remixes, as well as songs from artists who have influenced their sound, such as Renegade Soundwave, Meat Beat Manifesto, Carlos "After Dark" Berrios, and Kenny 'Dope' Gonzales.

=== 1999–2002: Surrender and Come with Us ===
In May 1999, the Chemical Brothers played three UK dates, their first since December 1997. Also that month, they released their first new original material in two years, a track called "Hey Boy Hey Girl". This was more house-influenced than big beat. In interviews at the time, Rowlands and Simons indicated that the track was inspired by nights out at Sheffield club Gatecrasher. The track was also one of their more commercially accessible tracks and went to number 3 in the UK chart.

Their third album, Surrender, was released in June 1999. It featured vocals from Noel Gallagher, Mercury Rev's Jonathan Donahue, and Mazzy Star's Hope Sandoval. As "Hey Boy Hey Girl" had suggested, the album was more house-oriented than the previous two. On one of the album's stand out tracks, "Out of Control", New Order's Bernard Sumner supported by Primal Scream's Bobby Gillespie provided vocals. It reached No. 1 in the UK Albums Chart. The Michel Gondry-directed music video for "Let Forever Be", which utilised ground-breaking video and film effects in its depiction of a young woman's nightmares, also received a lot of attention.

Later that summer, the Chemical Brothers performed at the Woodstock '99 concert on 24 July, with positive reception. They later headlined the Glastonbury dance tent on the Friday night, followed by a UK tour which ended in December and included Homelands Scotland on 4 September. In November, "Out of Control", featuring Sumner and Gillespie on vocals, was released as a single. The release also contained the Sasha remix. The final single from Surrender, in February 2000, was the five track "Music: Response" EP, containing the title track and two remixes, plus Electronic Battle Weapon 4, named "Freak of the Week", and a track called "Enjoyed", which was essentially a remix of "Out of Control" by the Chemical Brothers themselves. A CD copy of Surrender was placed in the third Blue Peter time capsule, buried in January 2000. That same month, they appeared on Primal Scream's album Xtrmntr at track 11 with a remix.

In June 2000, they played the Pyramid stage at the Glastonbury Festival. In August 2000 they played to a large crowd at the main stage at Creamfields festival, Ireland. In December 2000, the Chemical Brothers aired one of their new tracks, "It Began in Afrika" at their New York DJ gigs, supporting U2.

In 2001, they were active with releases and live performances. Early in the year, they began working on a fourth album, provisionally titled Chemical Four. The first track which fans got a taste of was "It Began in Afrika", as previously played in their DJ set in New York. The track would make its live debut in California in April 2001, at the Coachella Valley Music and Arts Festival. Another new track, "Galaxy Bounce", also got its public debut at Coachella. As had become customary for their releases and experiments, "It Began in Afrika" was first pressed as a promo, as part of the "Electronic Battle Weapon" series. It received much airplay on dance music radio shows in the UK, and became more and more popular in clubs over the course of the summer. It also became one of the "anthems" in Ibiza as the summer progressed. It was given a full commercial single release in September, reaching No. 8 in the UK singles chart, even though no promotional video was made for the track.

Rowlands and Simons also remixed a track from Fatboy Slim's Halfway Between the Gutter and the Stars, entitled "Song for Shelter". This remix was released as a single on 3 September 2001 (one week before "It Began in Afrika") as the CD2 single for "Song for Shelter / Ya Mama". It reached No. 30 in the UK singles chart (sales were combined with the CD1 single).

The Chemical Brothers finished work on another album, Come with Us, in October 2001. It featured collaborations with Richard Ashcroft of the Verve ("The Test"), and long-time collaborator Beth Orton ("The State We're In"). The album was released in January 2002, preceded by a single, "Star Guitar", a melodic Balearic beat number, with a promotional video by Michel Gondry that featured passing scenery synchronised to the beat viewed through a train window. What would be the second track on the album, "It Began in Afrika", was released 10 September 2001 to be circulated around the clubbing scene where it was a popular hit. "Star Guitar" was also released as a DVD single, the pair's first. Come with Us, was less well received than their previous albums, but nonetheless went straight to No. 1 in the UK Albums Chart in the first week of its release, selling 100,000 copies. In April, the title track from the album was released as a single with remixes by Fatboy Slim as part of a double A-sided release with "The Test".

During the summer of 2002, the Chemical Brothers travelled the festival circuit to promote the album. Later in 2002, they released two EPs, one specifically aimed at Japan and the other the US (entitled AmericanEP). Both contained remixes, live versions and B-sides. Additionally, the band produced New Order's "Here to Stay", written for the film 24 Hour Party People and released as a single to promote the soundtrack, and remixed the song as well. One of their other major songs from this album was "Galaxy Bounce", which was popular and featured as the main title music for the Xbox game Project Gotham Racing. It was also included on the soundtrack for the movie Lara Croft: Tomb Raider. "Star Guitar" was featured as a song on the PlayStation Portable's Lumines II.

Two other songs, "Come with Us (Introduction)" and "Star Guitar (Title Screen)", were featured on a PlayStation 2 racing game titled WRC II: Extreme. Both songs are instrumental. The song "My Elastic Eye" from the album Come with Us was played in the 2004 film The Butterfly Effect.

=== 2003–2006: Push the Button ===
Early 2003 saw Rowlands and Simons back in the studio working on new material, including "The Golden Path", a collaboration with Wayne Coyne of the Flaming Lips. This was released in September 2003, at the same time as a "best of" album, entitled Singles 93–03, marking ten years of the Chemical Brothers' releases. Singles 93–03 included most, but not all, of their singles. A second new track, in addition to "The Golden Path", was included on the album, called "Get Yourself High". Singles 93–03 was also released on DVD, with extra features including selected live performances and interviews with Rowlands, Simons, and many of their collaborators from throughout the period. "Get Yourself High", which featured Canadian rapper k-os on vocals, was released as a single in November 2003.

In late 2003 and 2004, the Chemical Brothers continued to work in the studio on new material and a remix of "Slow" by Kylie Minogue. After being released on rare white label vinyl, it was subsequently given a commercial release in March on CD (on her next single "Red Blooded Woman") and on 12-inch vinyl picture disc (containing two other Minogue remixes). In Summer 2004 they returned to the festival circuit, including appearances at the Glastonbury Festival, Tokyo, Scotland, and Ireland. They also visited South America for the second time (the first time being in 1999), arriving at Chile, Argentina, and Brazil. It was during these sets that they played new material, including "Acid Children", which proved to be one of the most popular new tracks.

In September 2004, the Chemical Brothers released the seventh "Electronic Battle Weapon". "Electronic Battle Weapon 7" was being released as a one-sided promo-only 12-inch, containing "Acid Children". A marked departure from the Chemical Brothers' previous musical endeavours, it featured a screeching 303 bassline and a distinctive vocal sample; a pitch-altered vocal sample proclaiming "You Are All My Children Now!", which is lifted from the horror film A Nightmare on Elm Street 2: Freddy's Revenge. It was coupled with the projection of a sinister clown mouthing these same words at their live gigs.

The "Electronic Battle Weapon" series of promo releases have typically been newly recorded Chemical Brothers tracks, released on promo to allow DJs to test them in a club environment, and to gauge their popularity.

In 2004, the Chemical Brothers began work on Push the Button, their fifth studio album, which features collaborations with Tim Burgess, Kele Okereke, and Anwar Superstar, amongst others. The album was released on 24 January 2005.

"Galvanize", which features rapper Q-Tip on vocals, was the first single to be taken from Push the Button, and premiered on iTunes. The single was released on 17 January 2005, and entered the UK chart at No. 3. The second single, "Believe" (featuring Kele Okereke from Bloc Party), failed to crack the top 10, but still made it into the top 20, peaking at No. 18. "The Boxer", featuring Tim Burgess, became the duo's first single to fail to crack the top 40.

The album and single "Galvanize" won a Grammy at the Grammy Awards of 2006. The track "Surface to Air" features a pulsing chord progression and bassline reminiscent of the intro to the Strokes song "The Modern Age".

An unofficial, remixed version of the album entitled Flip the Switch was released as a free download, along with the Believe EP, featuring six further remixes of "Believe".

In September 2006, the Chemical Brothers were revealed as the first musicians to be involved in Tate Tracks. Tate Modern invited various groups and songwriters to choose a work that inspired them from the gallery's collection of modern art and then write a track about it. The Chemical Brothers' submission, Rock Drill, was inspired by the Jacob Epstein sculpture Torso in Metal from the Rock Drill, and could be heard on headphones in front of the work in the gallery. From October 2006, it also became available to hear online at the Tate Tracks website.

=== 2007–2009: We Are the Night ===
The Brothers announced in June 2006 on their official web forum that the duo had been working on new material, specifically an album, code-named "Chemical 6". Simons also wrote that the band would be playing select venues in the Summer 2007 season, specifying Rome, and also Fabric in London. Simons was also quoted as saying that the duo were "hoping to put a battle weapon out for the summer", possibly referring to the Electronic Battle Weapon series, the somewhat experimental tracks the band occasionally released on white label record.

"Electronic Battle Weapon 8" and "9" were debuted on Pete Tong's BBC Radio 1 show on 8 December 2006. The double-sided vinyl was finally released just before the Chemical Brothers' much anticipated New Year's Eve gig at the famous Turnmills in London. The vinyl had a limited edition release worldwide and was received well by fans, DJs, and critics alike. "Electronic Battle Weapon 8", at about six and a half minutes, was very distinct from the "big acid" style that the earlier "Electronic Battle Weapons" adhered to. It was characterised by 'thundering' drums with a rising synth line. A version of this track featured on the We Are the Night album and was entitled "Saturate". "Electronic Battle Weapon 9" was a typical Chemicals dancefloor track with their trademark vocoder vocals coupled with sirens and a basic 'tribal' melody.

At the same Turnmills gig, the Brothers also played a previously unreleased song at midnight to welcome 2007, which went down well with the crowd. This track eventually emerged as "Burst Generator", found on the forthcoming album We Are the Night. Many were left wondering if the latest in the Electronic Battle Weapon series were simply one-off experiments or signalled a new direction they could take with the new album, perhaps swaying from their genre defining big beat albums of the past. The song was also the band's 100th released song.

On 21 March 2007, the Chemical Brothers officially announced their forthcoming album on Myspace. The new album, entitled We Are the Night, was released on 2 July 2007 in the United Kingdom and 17 July 2007 in the United States. The Chemical Brothers cited a delay in the production of artwork for this delay. EMI subsequently released an online Chemical Brothers computer game as an apology. The track listing was released on the official mailing list on 10 April. Collaborations featured heavily on the album, including Klaxons ("All Rights Reversed"), Midlake ("The Pills Won't Help You Now"), Ali Love ("Do It Again"), and Willy Mason ("Battle Scars").

On 12 April 2007, "Do It Again" aired on Pete Tong's "In New Music We Trust" show on BBC Radio 1. The official release of the single was 4 June (digital download) and 14 June (12-inch, 7-inch and CD). The album went on general release in the UK on 2 July 2007.

The Chemical Brothers supplied a new track for the Heroes soundtrack, titled "Keep My Composure". An alternate version of this track was released on Brotherhood, the duo's second singles compilation, which also featured the new single "Midnight Madness" and a second disc of every Electronic Battle Weapon released to date. The Chemical Brothers continued to tour into 2008 to promote the collection, including a landmark date at Olympia London.

=== 2010–2012: Further, film scoring and Don't Think ===
On 30 March 2010, the band announced on their website that their seventh studio album, titled Further, would be released on 22 June and would be "the band's first to be released with corresponding films made specifically to match each of the 8 audio tracks." The films were made with long-time visuals collaborators Adam Smith and Marcus Lyall. Before the release of the album, the band played four shows in May at the London Roundhouse where they played the album and its accompanying films in their entirety. Most reviews were positive, with BBC Music declaring that "... synths are brutally manhandled and pushed to their limits across the eight tracks". The Irish Times reported that "This is a very impressive collection that is carried along with a stirring sense of velocity and momentum".

At the New York Comic Con, on 10 October 2010, film director Joe Wright announced that the Chemical Brothers would be scoring the soundtrack to his forthcoming film, Hanna. Wright, who had worked with the Chemical Brothers in the past as a member of the visual company Vegetable Vision, stated that he was "very excited to finally ... work with a more modern beat. There's a lot of bass, it's very loud." The soundtrack was released on 15 March 2011. The duo also contributed a new version of the song "Don't Think" titled "Nina Frequency", as well as two new songs "Electric Hands" and "Danka Jane", to the soundtrack of the 2010 film Black Swan directed by Darren Aronofsky. All three songs have not been released.

The Chemical Brothers released their first concert film, Don't Think, in 2012, documenting their performance at Fuji Rock Festival in Japan in 2011. The film debuted in February in theatres around the world, including a premiere in London where attendees – including Matt Smith, Karen Gillan and Keira Knightley – were seen dancing in aisles and seats, leading one reviewer to remark "at times it was impossible to tell which 'hands in the air' were on screen and which were in the room." The film was the first concert film to be mixed in 7.1 surround sound, and was released on Blu-ray, DVD, and CD on 26 March 2012. In July 2012, the duo composed an official piece of music to soundtrack the cycling events at the 2012 Summer Olympics, titled 'Theme for Velodrome'.

=== 2012–2017: Rowlands' solo work and Born in the Echoes ===
After Hanna and Don't Think, Tom Rowlands worked on a number of solo projects. He remixed and produced music for Tinie Tempah, the Klaxons, I Break Horses, and New Order, scored the film Trespass Against Us starring Michael Fassbender and Brendan Gleeson; directed by longtime visual collaborator Adam Smith, and released 12-inch single Through Me / Nothing but Pleasure on Erol Alkan's label Phantasy in May 2013.

On 21 October 2014, the Chemical Brothers released "This Is Not a Game", a single created for The Hunger Games: Mockingjay – Part 1 soundtrack, featuring Miguel and Lorde. Following a cryptic marketing campaign, on 23 April, the Chemical Brothers premiered "Sometimes I Feel so Deserted" on BBC Radio 1. On 17 July, the duo released their eighth studio album Born in the Echoes, with singles including "Go" (featuring rapper Q-Tip) and "Wide Open" in collaboration with Beck. St. Vincent, Ali Love, and Cate Le Bon also feature on the album.

Along with the new album announcement, it was revealed that Simons would "take a break" from touring to focus on unspecified academic work. Adam Smith filled in for him on stage during the 2015 tour. During the tour, Simons attended a few shows as an audience member, and both he and Rowlands expressed concern in interviews that this could mark a permanent retirement. The first concert without Simons was performed at Siemens Arena in Lithuania. Smith continued to fill in through the end of 2015, most notably at Glastonbury and the Apple Music Festival, and uniquely controlled both lights and music from the stage.

Simons returned to live performances in 2016, performing at the Parklife Festival in Manchester, which included a brand new setlist. In November, the duo released the non-album single "C-H-E-M-I-C-A-L", having originally debuted as a demo in 2012, created to open their DJ sets.

=== 2018–2021: No Geography ===
On 10 January 2018, the Chemical Brothers confirmed production of their ninth album via Instagram and other social media platforms. They released their first song in three years on 28 September 2018, titled "Free Yourself", from the forthcoming album. On 7 March 2019, Formula 1 announced a collaboration with the Chemical Brothers, which was released the next day in the form of the song "We've Got To Try".

The Chemical Brothers' ninth studio album, No Geography, was released on 12 April 2019 to positive reviews. In 2020, the album won three Grammy Awards including Best Dance/Electronic Album, Best Dance Recording, and Best Music Video. "We've Got to Try" won the overall award and "Best Director" category at the 2019 Berlin Music Video Awards. The video for "Eve of Destruction", directed by Ollie Tong, took the 2nd place at the 2020 edition in the Best Art Director category.

=== 2021–present: For That Beautiful Feeling ===
On 22 April 2021, the Chemical Brothers released a then non-album single, "The Darkness That You Fear", with another song, "Work Energy Principle", being released as a B-side on 15 July.

On 19 July 2023, the Chemical Brothers announced their tenth studio album, For That Beautiful Feeling, releasing singles "No Reason", "Live Again" (featuring Halo Maud), "Skipping Like A Stone" (featuring Beck) and title track "For That Beautiful Feeling" prior to its release on 8 September 2023.

Alongside the album, announced that a biography, titled Paused in Cosmic Reflection, would be coming out in late October.

== Tomora ==
Tomora (stylized in all caps) is an electronic music supergroup formed in 2025 by Rowlands and singer-songwriter Aurora. The group's name is a portmanteau of the artists' first names.

== Discography ==
Studio albums

- Exit Planet Dust (1995)
- Dig Your Own Hole (1997)
- Surrender (1999)
- Come with Us (2002)
- Push the Button (2005)
- We Are the Night (2007)
- Further (2010)
- Born in the Echoes (2015)
- No Geography (2019)
- For That Beautiful Feeling (2023)

== Awards and nominations ==
List of awards and nominations received by the Chemical Brothers

Brit Awards

Year	Nominee / work	Award	Result
1997	The Chemical Brothers	British Dance Act	Nominated
1997	"Setting Sun" (featuring Noel Gallagher)	British Video of the Year	Nominated
1998	The Chemical Brothers	British Dance Act	Nominated
1998	"Block Rockin' Beats"	British Video of the Year	Nominated
2000	The Chemical Brothers	British Dance Act	Won
2000	Surrender	British Album of the Year	Nominated
2000	"Hey Boy Hey Girl"	British Single of the Year	Nominated
2000	"Let Forever Be" (featuring Noel Gallagher)	British Video of the Year	Nominated
2003	The Chemical Brothers	British Dance Act	Nominated

Chicago Film Critics Association

Year	Nominee / work	Award	Result
2011	Hanna	Best Original Score	Nominated

Grammy Awards

Year	Nominee / work	Award	Result
1998	"Block Rockin' Beats"	Best Rock Instrumental Performance	Won
1998	Dig Your Own Hole	Best Alternative Music Album	Nominated
2005	"Get Yourself High" (featuring k-os)	Best Dance/Electronic Recording	Nominated
2006	"Galvanize" (featuring Q-Tip)	Best Dance/Electronic Recording	Won
2006	Push the Button	Best Dance/Electronic Album	Won
2008	We Are the Night	Best Dance/Electronic Album	Won
2008	"Do It Again" (featuring Ali Love)	Best Dance/Electronic Recording	Nominated
2011	Further	Best Dance/Electronic Album	Nominated
2013	Don't Think	Best Dance/Electronic Album	Nominated
2016	Born in the Echoes	Best Dance/Electronic Album	Nominated
2016	"Go" (featuring Q-Tip)	Best Dance/Electronic Recording	Nominated
2020	"We've Got to Try"	Best Music Video	Nominated
2020	"Got to Keep On"	Best Dance/Electronic Recording	Won
2020	No Geography	Best Dance/Electronic Album	Won

Los Angeles Film Critics Association

Year	Nominee / work	Award	Result
2011	Hanna	Best Music	Won

Mercury Prize

Year	Nominee / work	Award	Result
1997	Dig Your Own Hole	Mercury Prize	Nominated
1999	Surrender	Mercury Prize	Nominated

MTV Europe Music Awards

Year	Nominee / work	Award	Result
1997	"Block Rockin' Beats"	Best Video	Nominated
1997	The Chemical Brothers	Best Electronic	Nominated
1999	The Chemical Brothers	Best Electronic	Nominated
2003	The Chemical Brothers	Best Electronic	Nominated
2005	"Galvanize" (featuring Q-Tip)	Best Song	Nominated
2005	"Believe" (featuring Kele Okereke)	Best Video	Won
2007	"The Salmon Dance" (featuring Fatlip)	Best Video	Nominated

MTV Video Music Awards

Year	Nominee / work	Award	Result
1997	"Block Rockin' Beats"	Best Dance Video	Nominated
1997	"Setting Sun" (featuring Noel Gallagher)	Breakthrough Video	Nominated
2000	"Let Forever Be" (featuring Noel Gallagher)	Breakthrough Video	Nominated
2015	"Go" (featuring Q-Tip)	Best Art Direction	Nominated

MTV Video Music Awards Japan

Year	Nominee / work	Award	Result
2002	The Chemical Brothers	Best Dance	Won
2004	Get Yourself High (featuring k-os)	Best Special Effects	Won
2008	"Do It Again" (featuring Ali Love)	Best Dance Video	Won
2015	"Go" (featuring Q-Tip)	Best Group Video	Nominated

MVPA Awards

Year	Nominee / work	Award	Result
2002	"Star Guitar"	Best Electronic Video	Won
2006	"Believe"	Best Electronic Video	Nominated
2008	"Salmon Dance"	Best Electronic Video	Nominated
2008	"Salmon Dance"	Best Animated Video	Won
2008	"Do It Again"	Best Electronic Video	Won
2008	"Do It Again"	Best Cinematography	Nominated

Q Awards

Year	Nominee / work	Award	Result
1999	Surrender	Best Album	Won
2000	The Chemical Brothers	Best Live Act	Nominated
2010	The Chemical Brothers	Hero Award	Won

Berlin Music Video Awards

Year	Nominee / work	Award	Result
2019	"We've Got to Try"	Best Music Video	Won
2019	Ninian Doff ("We've Got to Try")	Best Director	Won
2020	"Eve of Destruction"	Best Art Director	Won
