= The Crunch Bird =

- Directed by: Ted Petok
- Produced by: Ted Petok
- Starring: Len Maxwell
- Animation by: Joe Petrovich
- Production companies: Maxwell-Petok-Petrovich Productions; Regency Films
- Distributed by: Regency Films
- Release date: 1971
- Running time: 2 min.
- Country: USA
- Language: English

The Crunch Bird (El pájaro crujiente) is an animated short by Joe Petrovich, Len Maxwell, and Ted Petok. It won the 1971 Academy Award for Best Animated Short Film. The short revolves around a bird that has the ability to devour anything, and which acts on orders from its masters. Its new master accidentally instructs the bird to devour his own buttocks.

Joe Petrovich animated the cartoon. Len Maxwell provided the voices for the husband, wife, and pet shop owner. It was followed by the sequel Crunch Bird II in 1975. It is based on an old joke called "crunchy bird" which concludes in a similar way. The film softened the victim's fate by changing "crunchy bird, my eye" to "crunch bird, my ass", despite the language itself being coarser.

== Plot ==
A narrator tells of a woman searching for a birthday gift for her husband Murray, who has few interests and is largely occupied by his job. At a pet store, the proprietor offers a "Crunch Bird." The Crunch Bird devours anything to which its master directs it. To demonstrate, the proprietor commands, "Crunch Bird! The chair!" and the bird reduces a wooden straight chair to sawdust within seconds. The woman is impressed by the bird's talent, buys it, and takes it home.

Murray, exhausted from a hard day at his job, comes home. His wife shows him his birthday present, the Crunch Bird. Crabbily, the husband replies, "Crunch Bird, my ass!" The bird swoops toward Murray, and the credits roll.

== Legacy ==
With a running time of only two minutes and thirty two seconds, it is the shortest animated short film ever to receive an Academy Award.

It was also one of the first animation outside New York or California (Michigan) to win an Oscar (Oregon's Closed Mondays from 1974 and Louisiana's The Fantastic Flying Books of Mr. Morris Lessmore from 2010).

The Crunch Bird appeared on the 1982 TV series Jokebook. The short was censored in it as one line was changed from "Crunch Bird, my ass!" to "Crunch Bird, my butt!"

== See also ==
- List of American films of 1971
- Detroit, Michigan
- Culture of Michigan
