= Our Uniform =

2023 Iranian short film

- Promotional release poster
- Directed by: Yegane Moghaddam
- Screenplay by: Yegane Moghaddam
- Produced by: Yegane Moghaddam; Jalil Moghaddam
- Starring: Yegane Moghaddam
- Music by: Maryann Tedstone; Michael Tedstone
- Release dates: 6 May 2023 (Animayo); 12 June 2023 (Annecy)
- Running time: 7 minutes
- Country: Iran
- Language: Persian

Our Uniform is a 2023 Iranian stop-motion animated short film written, directed, and produced by Yegane Moghaddam. The film documents Moghaddam's experience with hijab, using the hijab itself as a canvas for animation.

The film was nominated for Best Animated Short Film at the 96th Academy Awards but lost to War Is Over!.

In 2026, Moghaddam made Our Uniform available to watch fully on her official Vimeo channel.

== Synopsis ==
In the film, Moghaddam recalls her experience wearing hijab as a school uniform in an Iranian girls' school and recounts how her perspective on hijab changed as she moved to the United States.

== Production ==
Moghaddam began work on the film in September 2022 amid the Mahsa Amini protests, when she felt inspired to document her experiences with hijab. Although Moghaddam wrote and directed the film herself, she described it as "basically a family project", with her father Jalil Moghaddam co-producing, her mother helping with embroidery, and her brother creating the film's Digital Cinema Package.

The film is animated in stop motion using the hijab's wrinkled fabric as a canvas, with superimposed characters drawn in colored pencil. Regarding her inspiration for the film's animation medium, Moghaddam said, "I always wanted to make a film about this 'ever-present' piece of clothing that is like a background or a canvas on which all our daily activities are reflected."

== Reception ==
=== Critical reception ===
Our Uniform received generally favorable reviews from critics. In a review for The New York Times, Maya Phillips wrote that Moghaddam "packs a lot into a succinct reflection on her school uniform and the ways her culture's restrictive fashion rules shaped her understanding of her gender and autonomy," adding that the film "shows the most creative animation concept" of the year's Academy Award for Best Animated Short Film nominees. Writing for Variety, Peter Debruge praised the creativity of the film's animation, noting that Moghaddam "creatively experiments with various techniques, manipulating garments to suggest motion and drawing directly onto different fabrics (as when a sweatshirt unzips to reveal the thoughts inside a young girl's head)." Collin Souter of RogerEbert.com also praised the film, writing, "The tangible nature of the animation is really strong, with many fabrics, sewing tools and threads telling the stories in a charming, fast-paced style," concluding "It might not be deep, but it's worth a watch."

=== Accolades ===
Our Uniform premiered on 6 May 2023 at Spain's Animayo International Film Festival, where it won the Grand Jury Prize and the Award for Best Mixed Technique. It also won the Jean-Luc Xiberras Award for a First Film at the 2023 Annecy International Animation Film Festival. It was nominated for Best Animated Short Film at the 96th Academy Awards, losing to War Is Over!

== External link ==
- Our Uniform on Vimeo
