= Pachyderme =

2022 animated short film by Stéphanie Clément

- Release poster
- Directed by: Stéphanie Clément
- Written by: Marc Rius
- Produced by: Thomas Giusiano; Mathieu Rey; Marc Rius
- Starring: Christa Théret
- Edited by: Stéphanie Clément
- Music by: Olivier Militon
- Animation by: Marthe Delaporte (3D); Jérémy Ortiz (3D); Marine Vaisse (3D); Marc Robinet (2D); Mina Convers (2D); Morten Riisberg Hansen (2D)
- Color process: Color
- Production companies: TNZPV Productions; Folimage
- Distributed by: Miyu Distribution
- Release dates: 24 April 2022 (Festival national du film d'animation); 12 June 2022 (Arte)
- Running time: 11 minutes
- Country: France
- Language: French

Pachyderme (French pronunciation: [pa.ʃi.dɛʁm]) is a 2022 French animated short film directed by Stéphanie Clément. Blending traditional and computer animation, the film is a subtle narrative about a young girl's survival of childhood abuse. The animation creates a visual metaphor for the dissociative nature of the trauma she suffers. It features the voice of Christa Théret. It won Best Short Film at the Manchester Animation Festival and Best Animated Short at the Foyle Film Festival, and was nominated for Best Animated Short Film at the 96th Academy Awards.

== Synopsis ==
A nine-year-old girl is dropped off by her parents at her grandparents' country house, where she is to spend ten days on holiday. On the way to her room she has to walk past the tusk of a pachyderm. At night, she is frightened by the knots of wood in the ceiling that resemble eyes. Rather than count sheep, she must kill the "monsters" to fall asleep. She is also unsettled by the old wooden floorboards that creak outside her room. Her grandmother assures her that her room is safe and that nothing can happen to her at their home, telling her to go to sleep. She hides in the wallpaper and closes her eyes.

One day she pricks herself with a fishing hook and her grandfather heals it with a kiss. Although it no longer hurt, she would smell his saliva on her finger all day long. Outside, he cuts off the rosebuds because he does not like to see the flowers wither. He removes her bike's training wheels and takes her to a lake, where he goes fishing and she swims in her underwear. One day, a woman drowns in the lake. At night, her grandfather sometimes takes her into the forest to listen to animals, where she is told not to move and keep quiet. One day he enters her room and she sinks into the wallpaper.

One day it snows in the summer and her grandfather dies. That same night, the tusk is broken and later glued back together by her grandmother. Afterwards, the girl rarely visits her grandmother. The girl matures into adulthood and, after her grandmother's death, attempts to drown the tusk into the lake. But the lake can never be deep enough.

== Production ==
"I sought to create images that would inspire in the viewer a mixed feeling of gentleness and unease. By introducing, for example, a sense of disquiet through framing and composition. The sky is virtually non-existent in the film. When the sky is present, it is obstructed by an element – the grandparents' house, a tree, etc. – to evoke the character's lack of escape. The little girl is a prisoner, trapped in a play of frame-within-a-frame, the outline of a door or a window. She is often fragmented in the shot, her upper body separated from her lower, as if dispossessed of herself. Sometimes, it's her eyes that are cropped out, as the sign of a forbidden."

—Stéphanie Clément

The film follows a young woman named Louise who remembers her summer vacation to the countryside to stay with her grandparents. The story is told through fairytale-like, concise animations that evoke the style of children's books, and which ambiguously and subtly create an eerie atmosphere where the young girl perceives the grandfather as a silent, foreboding presence.

Stéphanie Clément and screenwriter Marc Rius both originate from Provence. The project began from their shared desire to work together and approach the topic of incest. They worked to craft a film based on various psychological defense mechanisms, such as dissociation and repression. According to Clément, their story focuses on "an emotionally anesthetized character who struggles with their own memories". They chose the remoteness of the south of France as their setting and wanted the narrative to reflect the "banality" of everyday life there. They also adapted the film's color scheme to capture the landscape of the region. They used dreamlike imagery and symbolism to ensure viewers were more receptive to the difficult subject matter and to further evoke different feelings in the viewer.

Pachyderme was produced by Tu Nous ZA Pas Vus (TNZPV) Productions and Folimage. It received support from the Centre national du cinéma et de l'image animée (CNC), Arte France, Région Provence-Alpes-Côte d'Azur, Région Grand Est, Département de la Haute-Savoie, Département de la Drôme, Valence Romans Agglo, and SACEM in association with the Maison du Film. The film blends 2D animation from the Folimage studio with the Blender CGI technology of TNZPV Studio's 3D teams.

== Release ==
The film premiered on 24 April 2022 at the Festival national du film d'animation in Rennes. It was broadcast in Germany and France on 12 June 2022 through the Arte television channel. It was also screened in the official competition at the Annecy International Animation Film Festival on 13 June 2022. Distribution was handled by Miyu Distribution.

== Reception ==
=== Accolades ===
Award	Date of ceremony	Category	Recipient(s)	Result	Ref.
Academy Awards	10 March 2024	Best Animated Short Film	Stéphanie Clément and Marc Rius	Nominated	
Animafest Zagreb	11 June 2022	Grand Prix – Short Film	Pachyderme	Nominated	
Annecy International Animation Film Festival	18 June 2022	Cristal du court métrage	Pachyderme	Nominated	
Annecy International Animation Film Festival	18 June 2022	Prix du jury SensCritique	Pachyderme	Won	
Foyle Film Festival	27 November 2022	Light in Motion Competition – Best Animated Short	Pachyderme	Won	
Manchester Animation Festival	18 November 2022	Best Short Film	Pachyderme	Won	
Meknes International Animated Film Festival	8 March 2023	Grand Prix	Pachyderme	Won	
Nice European Short Film Festival (Un Festival C'est Trop Court!)	14 October 2022	Prix Courts d'Ici	Pachyderme	Won	
Voix d'Étoiles – Festival international des voix du cinéma d'animation	29 October 2022	Étoile du meilleur court métrage	Pachyderme	Won	
