= Dave Mullins (animator) =

American animator

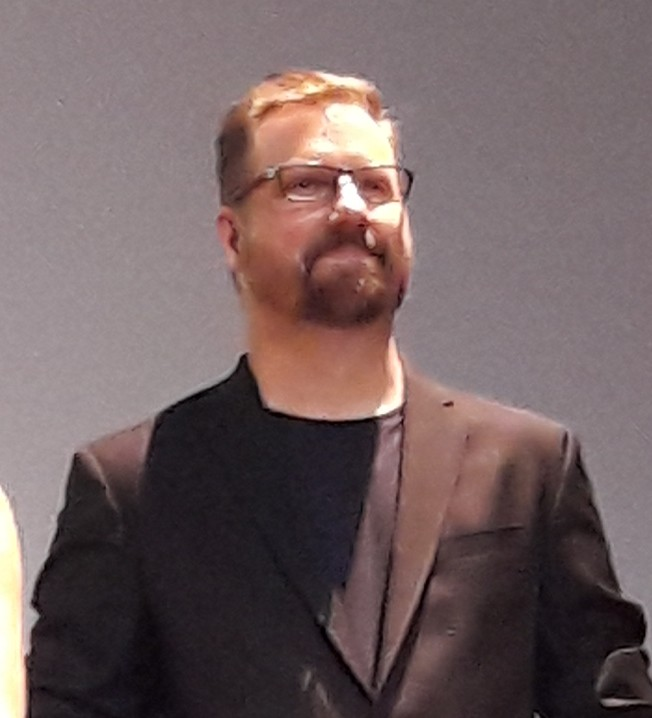
- Education: Cleveland Institute of Art (1988); Rhode Island School of Design (1989-1993) (BFA); Brown University (1992)
- Occupations: Film director; producer; writer; animator
- Years active: 1994-present
- Employer(s): Pike Productions (1992-1993); The Post Group (1993-1994); Walt Disney Animation Studios (1995-1998); Gnomon School of Visual Effects (1998); Dream Quest Images (1998); Digital Domain (1998); California Institute of the Arts (1998-1999); Sony Pictures Imageworks (1998-1999); Pixar Animation Studios (2000-2020); Academy of Art University (2001-2004); Animation Mentor (2006-2007); Pearl Studio (2019-2020); Alchemy Films Inc. (2020-present); ElectroLeague (2021-present)
- Title: Owner of Alchemy Films Inc. Co-Founder of ElectroLeague
- Website: ElectroLeague

David Mullins is an American writer, director and animator who worked at Pixar Animation Studios from 2000 to 2020. A co-founder of the Los Angeles-based animation studio ElectroLeague, he is best known for his animated short film LOU (2017), which was nominated for Academy Award for Best Animated Short Film at the 90th Academy Awards. On January 23, 2024, Mullins won in the same category, with the short film WAR IS OVER! Inspired by the Music of John and Ono (2023) at the 96th Academy Awards.

== Filmography ==
- 2023: WAR IS OVER! Inspired by the Music of John and Ono (director, writer)
- 2021: Dug Days (TV Series) (animation characters developer - 5 episodes)
- 2020: Soul (additional animation supervisor)
- 2018: Incredibles 2 (supervising animator)
- 2017: Coco (additional animator)
- 2017: Cars 3 (animator)
- 2017: LOU (director, writer)
- 2015: The Good Dinosaur (additional animation supervisor)
- 2015: Inside Out (additional animator)
- 2012: Brave (additional animator)
- 2011: A Day in the Life of John Lasseter (himself)
- 2011: Cars 2: The Video Game (Video Game) (supervising animator)
- 2011: Cars 2 (supervising animator)
- 2009: Up (Video Game) (directing animator)
- 2009: Up (directing animator)
- 2007: Ratatouille (animator)
- 2006: Mater and the Ghostlight (Video short) (animator)
- 2006: Cars (animator)
- 2005: One Man Band (Short) (animator)
- 2004: The Incredibles (animation characters developer, animator)
- 2003: Finding Nemo (animator)
- 2001: Monsters, Inc. (animator)
- 1999: Fantasia 2000 (assistant animator)
- 1999: Stuart Little (animator)
- 1998: Mighty Joe Young (animator)
- 1998: Björk: Hunter (Video short) (animator)
- 1996: Alien Trilogy (Video Game) (animator)
- 1994: Thunder in Paradise (TV Series) (3D animator - 21 episodes)

== Awards and nominations ==
- Won: Academy Award for Best Animated Short Film for WAR IS OVER! Inspired by the Music of John and Ono (2023)
- Won: Annie Awards for Best Animated Short Subject (2023)
- Nominated: Academy Award for Best Animated Short Film for LOU (2017)
- Nominated: San Francisco International Film Festival - Golden Gate Award for Best Family Film
- Nominated: SXSW Film Festival - SXSW Grand Jury Award for Animated Short
