= Knight of Fortune =

- Poster
- Danish: Ridder Lykke
- Literally: Knight of Fortune
- Directed by: Lasse Lyskjær Noer
- Written by: Lasse Lyskjær Noer
- Produced by: Christian Norlyk; Kim Magnusson; Hanne Bruun; Tobias Damkjær
- Starring: Leif Andrée; Jens Jørn Spottag; Jesper Lohmann
- Cinematography: Lasse Ulvedal Tolbøll
- Edited by: Simon Dræby Carstens
- Music by: Mathias Mikkelsen
- Production company: Jalabert Production
- Distributed by: TV2
- Release date: 2022
- Running time: 24 minutes
- Country: Denmark
- Language: Danish

Knight of Fortune is a 2022 Danish short drama film written and directed by Lasse Lyskjær Noer and produced by Jalabert Productions.

== Plot ==
Karl is a widower seeing his late wife at the morgue. He struggles to accept his loss and can not bring himself to open the casket to see her. He meets another widower, Torben, in the bathroom, when the latter asks for toilet paper. Torben then asks Karl to help him see his dead wife, as he does not believe he has the strength to do it himself. Karl, initially hesitant, changes his mind when Torben looks sad, followed by Karl asking him why he could not do it with his friends or family.

The two then enter one of the rooms to see Torben's dead wife. Torben convinces Karl to both open the chest to see his wife. Torben then tells Karl that he has prepared a 32-page speech to his deceased wife. Seemingly a bit annoyed, Karl ultimately decides to stay for Torben's speech. As Torben delivers his speech, the two find a common ground as they realize that both their wives were fans of the song "Knight of Fortune" by Rocazino. The pair then seem to both enjoy their following conversation but are interrupted by the Mortuary Porter and eight people entering the room.

The porter entering the room then presents the chest to the eight people. Karl, a bit confused, looks at Torben, who with dread takes some steps back towards the wall. Karl joins him, still confused about what is going on. Karl asks Torben whether the people entering are of his family, but Torben shakes his head. As the people walk up to the chest, both guys tell them their condolences. Karl slowly realizes that Torben does not know the deceased woman in the chest, but plays along with Torben, who acts like he knew her to the others in the room. Karl later leaves the room, seeming somewhat angry. Torben follows him, but Karl ignores him. Karl then enters the room with the chest of his own deceased wife, and stops himself from going further into the room, and begins to talk with Torben again, asking him to leave. In the room, the porter joins Karl. Karl then asks the porter who Torben was. The porter explains to him that Torben lost his wife in a boating incident 3 years earlier, and her body was never found, thereby never giving Torben a chance to pay his proper goodbyes. When leaving the morgue, Karl spots Torben sitting on a bench. About to open his car, Karl thinks twice and instead decides to join Torben on the bench. The pair then look at each other and laugh. In the end, they both go back into the morgue, where Torben helps Karl at last open up the chest of his deceased wife. The movie ends with Karl kissing his dead wife, and Torben singing "Knight of Fortune".

== Release ==
The film was released on the Danish streaming platform TV 2 Play.

== Cast ==
- Leif Andrée as Karl
- Jens Jørn Spottag as Torben
- Jesper Lohmann as Mortuary Porter
- Dick Kaysø as the widow of Lotte
- Oliver Due as Søren, an Intern
- Bodil Larsen as Lotte
- Margit Christiansen as Karen
- Dorthe Rømer as Relative No. 1
- Michael Martini as Relative No. 2
- Sussane Storm as Relative No. 3
- Andreas Rasbak as Relative No. 4
- Karina Lundbech Mortensen as Relative No. 5
- Melanie Sørensen as Relative No. 6
- Nadine Sørensen as Relative No. 7
- Virgil Høstrup Damkjær as Relative No. 8

== Awards ==
Award	Date	Category	Status	Ref
BendFilm	2023	Audience Award	Won	
Academy Awards	2024	Best Live Action Short Film	Nominated	
