= Bob Gardiner (animator) =

American artist, filmmaker, and multimedia creator (1951-2005)

- Gardiner, c. 1978
- Born: James Robbins Gardiner; March 19, 1951; Torrance, California, US
- Died: April 21, 2005 (aged 54); Grass Valley, California, US
- Partner: Kara Evanson
- Children: 2

James Robbins "Bob" Gardiner (March 19, 1951 – April 21, 2005) was an American artist, painter, cartoonist, animator, holographer, musician, storyteller, and comedy writer. He invented the stop-motion 3-D clay animation technique which his collaborator Will Vinton would later market as Claymation, although Bob preferred the term Sculptimation for his frame-by-frame method of sculpting plasticine clay characters and sets.

== Career ==
Gardiner and Vinton shared the 1974 Academy Award for Best Animated Short Film for Closed Mondays. The film was preserved by the Academy Film Archive in 2012. The two men had a falling out after the Academy Awards. Gardiner was excluded from Will Vinton Studios, which would eventually become Laika.

Gardiner continued to work in the entertainment industry by writing lyrics, commercials, and for the Smothers Brothers. In his later years, Gardiner made a living by selling his artwork, making fliers, painting signs, and other odd jobs.

== Personal life ==
Gardiner has been described as a very smart but complicated person who struggled with his mental health. His brother, John, recalled that, "He drove everybody crazy, but we loved him madly." His sister, Ann, suspects that he may have had bipolar disorder.

While living in Portland, Oregon, Gardiner met Kara Evenson, and they had two daughters in the 1980s. In 1991, he moved to Nevada County, California and lived for several years with his mother in Grass Valley. He entered Alcoholics Anonymous in 2001.

== Death ==
Gardiner died by suicide on April 21, 2005, while living at the Everhart Hotel in downtown Grass Valley.

He had been arrested a week before his death, and his sister hoped that he would receive a medical evaluation. Gardiner's daughters called the police the day of his suicide, as they became concerned after not being able to reach him.

== Filmography ==
- Closed Mondays (1974), writer, art direction, and sculptimation
- Mountain Music (1975), art direction and sculptimation (uncredited)
- Rolling Stone Magazine: The 10th Anniversary (1977) animation department, opening sequence

== Graphic art ==
1979 advertising posters by Bob Gardiner
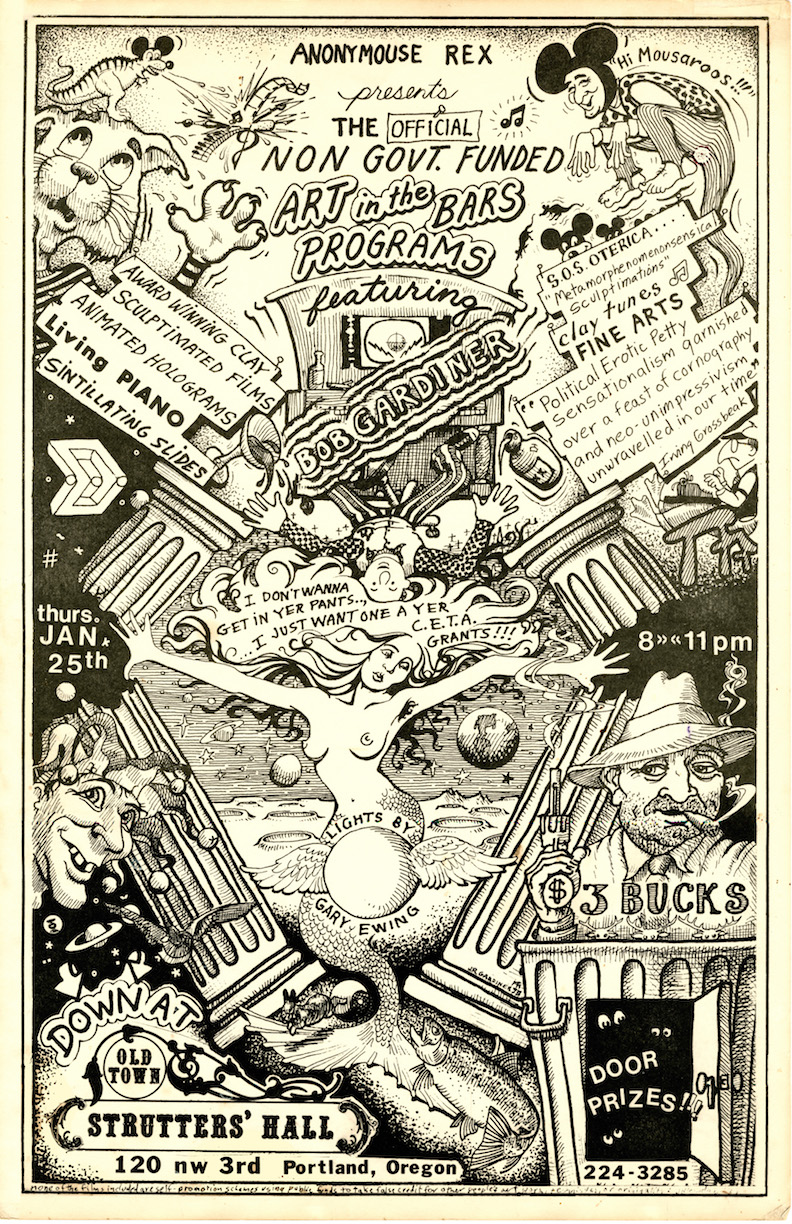
Advertising poster for Bob Gardiner's multi-media event, January 25, 1979, at Strutters' Hall, Portland, OR.

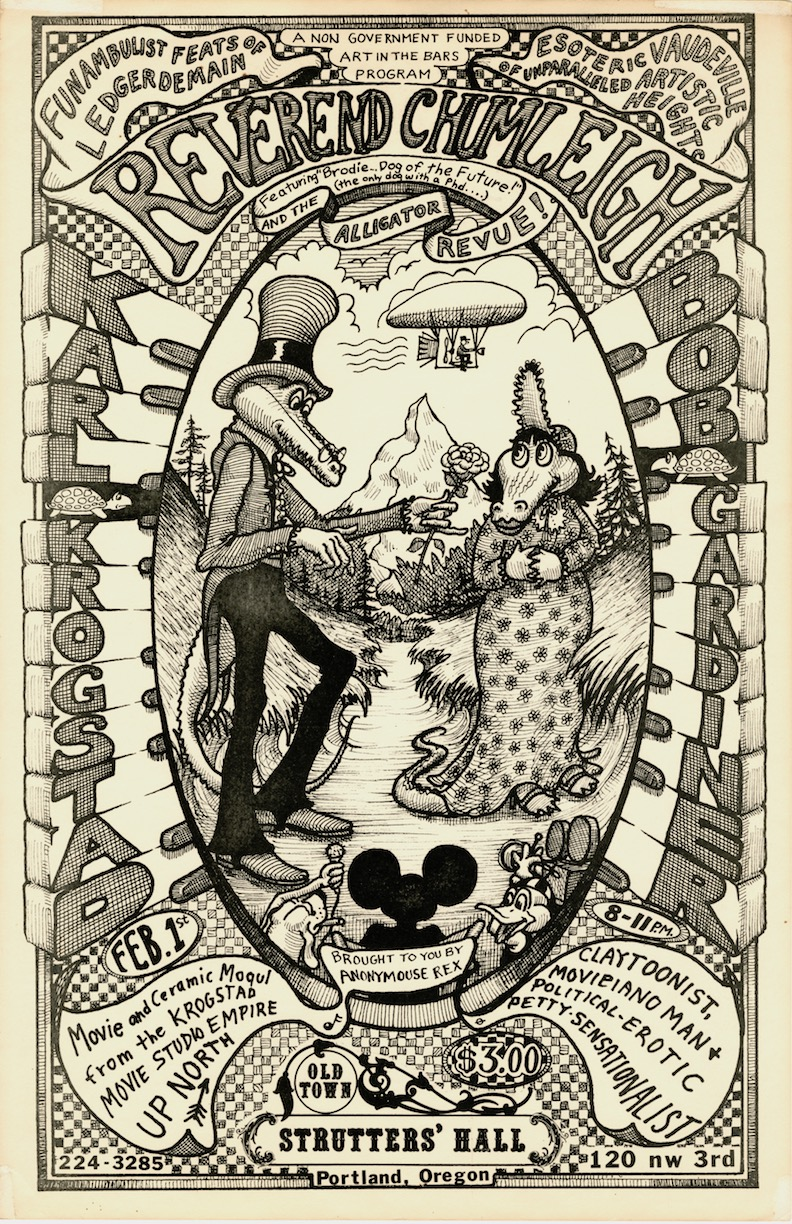
Advertising poster for Bob Gardiner's multi-media event, February 1, 1979, at Strutters' Hall, Portland, OR.

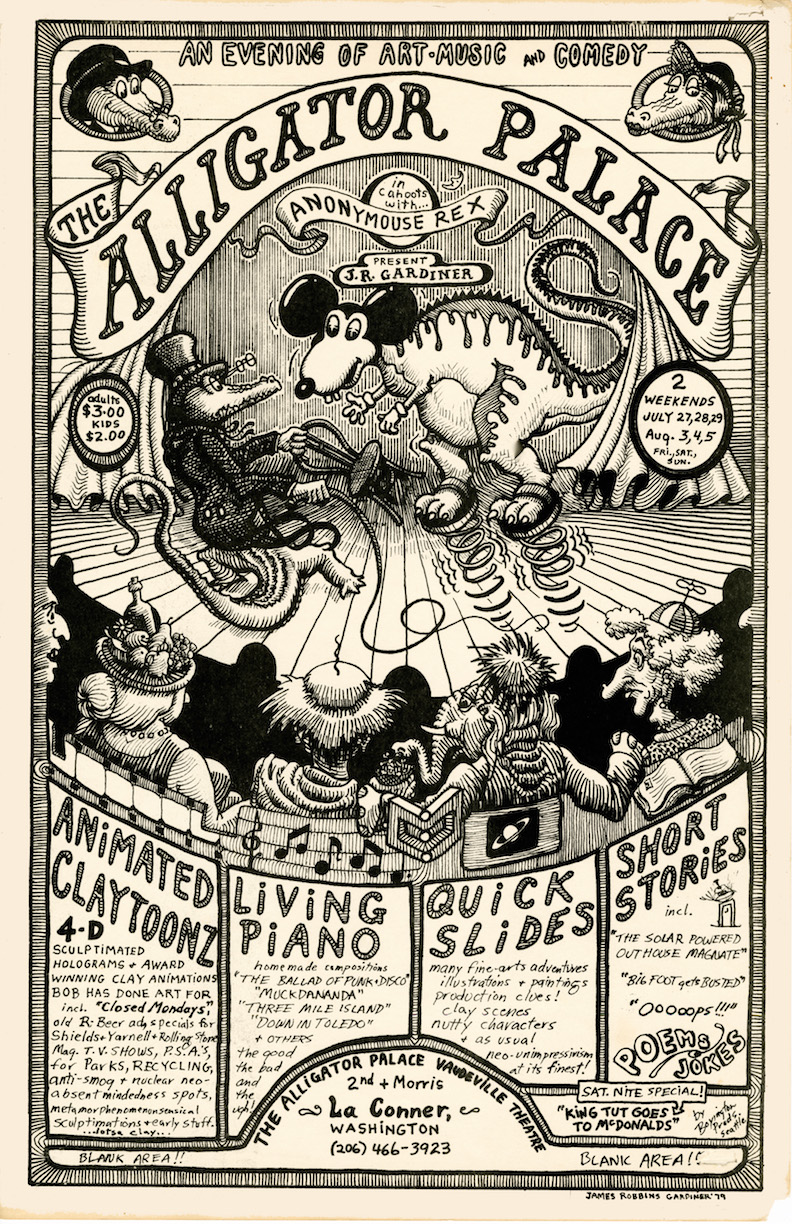
Advertising poster for Bob Gardiner's multi-media event, July 27-29 & August 3-5, 1979, at The Alligator Palace Vaudeville Theatre, La Conner, WA.

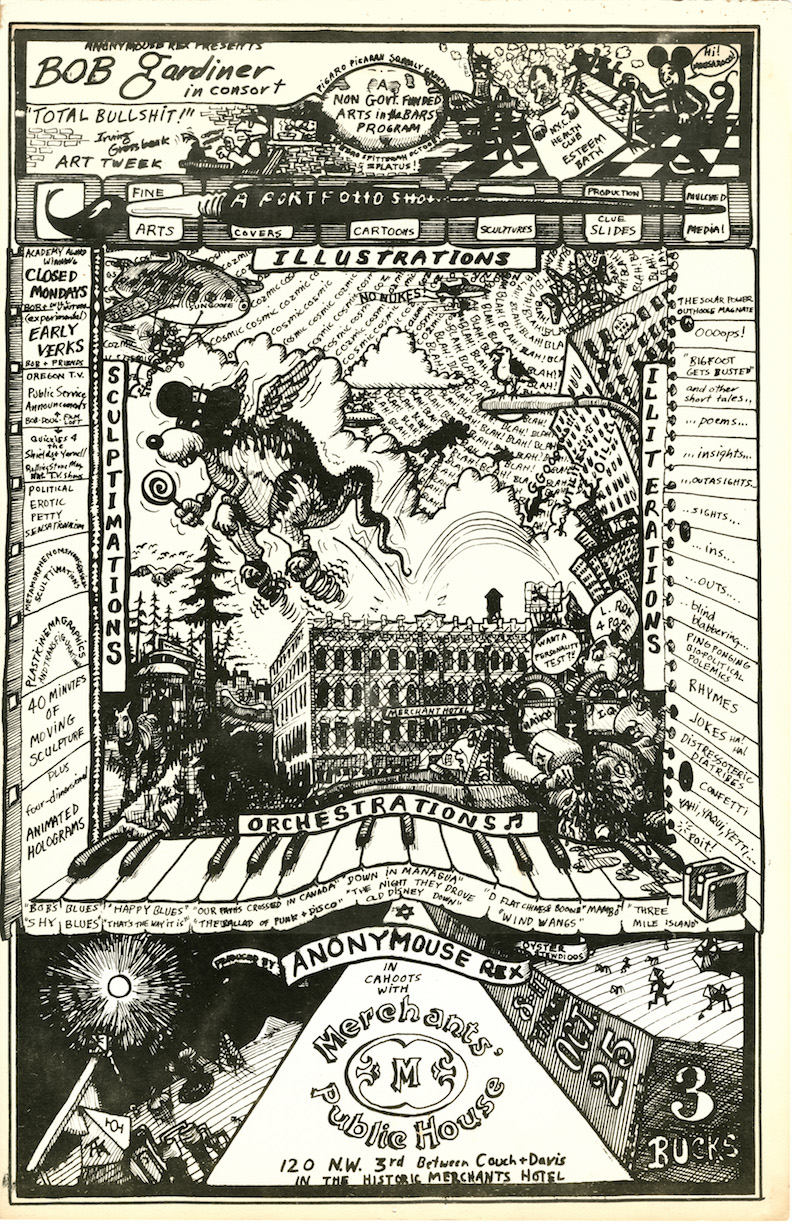
Advertising poster for Bob Gardiner's multi-media event, October 25,1979, at Merchants' Public House, Portland, OR.

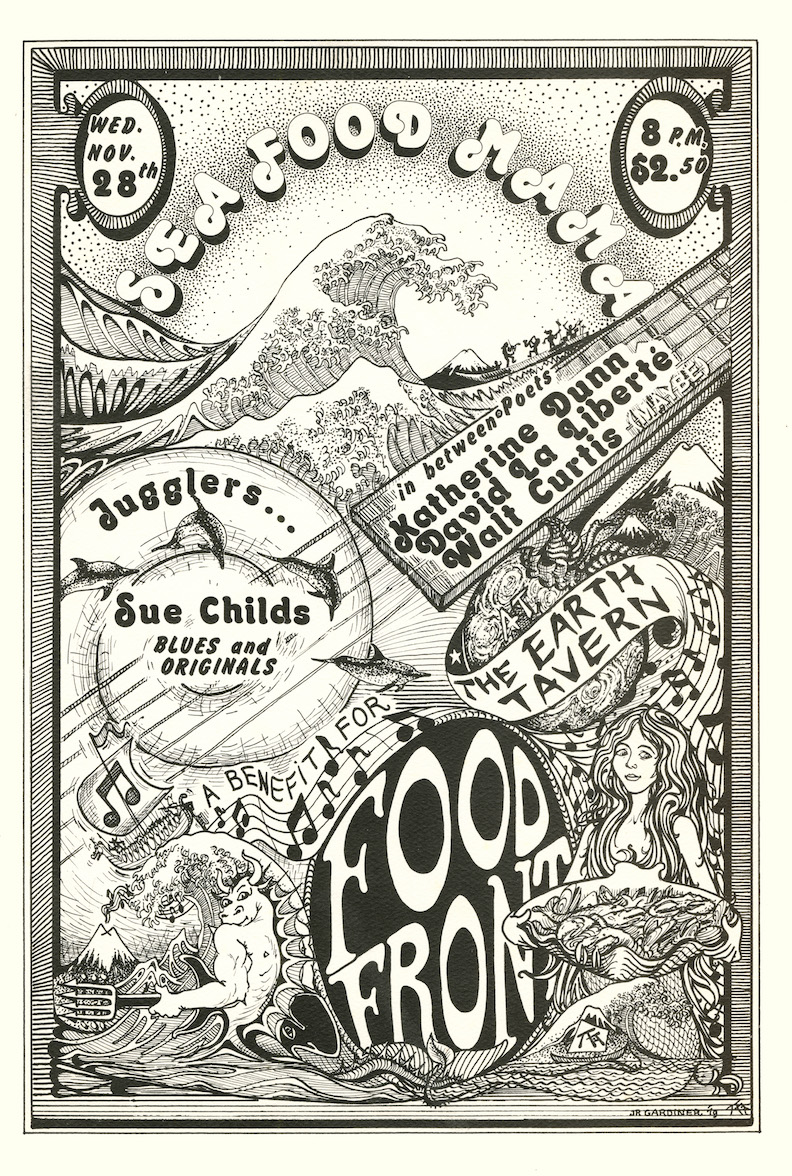
Advertising poster for Bob Gardiner's multi-media fundraiser event on behalf of The Food Front, November 28, 1979, at The Earth Tavern, Portland, OR.
Lost mural by Bob Gardiner
Lost mural painted by Bob Gardiner on exterior wall of a Portland repertory theater no longer in business, circa early 1980s.

== Accolades ==
Gardiner and Vinton won the Oscar for Best Animated Short in 1975 for Closed Mondays (1974).
