= Academy Award for Best Animated Short Film =

Annual award given by the Academy of Motion Picture Arts and Sciences

- Country: United States
- Presented by: Academy of Motion Picture Arts and Sciences (AMPAS)
- Formerly called: Short Subjects, Cartoons (1932–70); Short Subjects, Animated Films (1971–73)
- First award: November 18, 1932; 93 years ago (for films released during the 1931/1932 film season)
- Most recent winner: Chris Lavis and Maciek Szczerbowski; The Girl Who Cried Pearls (2025)
- Website: oscars.org

The Academy Award for Best Animated Short Film is an award given by the Academy of Motion Picture Arts and Sciences (AMPAS) as part of the annual Academy Awards, or Oscars, since the 5th Academy Awards (with different names), covering the year 1931–32, to the present.

From 1932 until 1970, the category was known as Short Subjects, Cartoons; and from 1971 to 1973 as Short Subjects, Animated Films. The present title began with the 46th Awards in 1974. During the first 5 decades of the award's existence, awards were presented to the producers of the shorts. Current Academy rules, however, call for the award to be presented to "the individual person most directly responsible for the concept and the creative execution of the film." Moreover, "[i]n the event that more than one individual has been directly and importantly involved in creative decisions, a second statuette may be awarded."

Only American films were nominated for the award until the National Film Board of Canada (NFB) was nominated for The Romance of Transportation in Canada in 1952. The first non-English-language international short to win was Zagreb Film's Ersatz (The Substitute) in 1961.

The first film to win in this category was Flowers and Trees by Walt Disney, who has since held the category's record for most nominations (39) and most wins (12). MGM's Tom and Jerry (1940–67) is the category's most lauded animated series over all, being nominated for a total of 13 Oscars and winning 7. Warner Bros.'s Looney Tunes/Merrie Melodies series also had a big amount of 16 Oscar nominations and winning 5. Among international studios, the NFB has the most wins in this category, with 7 Oscars. The biggest showing from Britain in this category is Nick Park, with three wins: 1 for Creature Comforts and 2 for the Wallace & Gromit series.

The Academy defines short as being "not more than 40 minutes, including all credits." Fifteen films are shortlisted before nominations are announced. In the listings below, the title shown in boldface was the winner of the award in that given year, followed by the other nominees for that year.

== Winners and nominees ==
All bars that are highlighted yellow were winners—with the title and name shown in boldface.

=== 1930s ===
Year	Film	Nominees
1931/32 (5th)	**Flowers and Trees**	**Walt Disney**
1931/32 (5th)	It's Got Me Again!	Hugh Harman, Rudolf Ising & Leon Schlesinger
1931/32 (5th)	Mickey's Orphans	Walt Disney
1932/33 (6th)	**Three Little Pigs**	**Walt Disney**
1932/33 (6th)	Building a Building	Walt Disney
1932/33 (6th)	The Merry Old Soul	Walter Lantz
1934 (7th)	**The Tortoise and the Hare**	**Walt Disney**
1934 (7th)	Holiday Land	Charles Mintz
1934 (7th)	Jolly Little Elves	Walter Lantz
1935 (8th)	**Three Orphan Kittens**	**Walt Disney**
1935 (8th)	The Calico Dragon	Hugh Harman & Rudolf Ising
1935 (8th)	Who Killed Cock Robin?	Walt Disney
1936 (9th)	**The Country Cousin**	**Walt Disney**
1936 (9th)	The Old Mill Pond	Hugh Harman & Rudolf Ising
1936 (9th)	Popeye the Sailor Meets Sindbad the Sailor	Max Fleischer
1937 (10th)	**The Old Mill**	**Walt Disney**
1937 (10th)	Educated Fish	Max Fleischer
1937 (10th)	Little Match Girl	Charles Mintz
1938 (11th)	**Ferdinand the Bull**	**Walt Disney**
1938 (11th)	Brave Little Tailor	Walt Disney
1938 (11th)	Good Scouts	Walt Disney
1938 (11th)	Hunky and Spunky	Max Fleischer
1938 (11th)	Mother Goose Goes Hollywood	Walt Disney
1939 (12th)	**The Ugly Duckling**	**Walt Disney**
1939 (12th)	Detouring America	Leon Schlesinger
1939 (12th)	Peace on Earth	Hugh Harman
1939 (12th)	The Pointer	Walt Disney

=== 1940s ===
Year	Film	Nominees
1940 (13th)	**The Milky Way**	**Rudolf Ising**
1940 (13th)	Puss Gets the Boot	Rudolf Ising
1940 (13th)	A Wild Hare	Leon Schlesinger
1941 (14th)	**Lend a Paw**	**Walt Disney**
1941 (14th)	Boogie Woogie Bugle Boy of Company "B"	Walter Lantz
1941 (14th)	Hiawatha's Rabbit Hunt	Leon Schlesinger
1941 (14th)	How War Came	Lawson Harris
1941 (14th)	The Night Before Christmas	Fred Quimby
1941 (14th)	Rhapsody in Rivets	Leon Schlesinger
1941 (14th)	Rhythm in the Ranks	George Pal
1941 (14th)	The Rookie Bear	Rudolf Ising
1941 (14th)	Superman	Max Fleischer
1941 (14th)	Truant Officer Donald	Walt Disney
1942 (15th)	**Der Fuehrer's Face**	**Walt Disney**
1942 (15th)	All Out for "V"	Paul Terry
1942 (15th)	Blitz Wolf	Fred Quimby
1942 (15th)	Juke Box Jamboree	Walter Lantz
1942 (15th)	Pigs in a Polka	Leon Schlesinger
1942 (15th)	Tulips Shall Grow	George Pal
1943 (16th)	**The Yankee Doodle Mouse**	**Fred Quimby**
1943 (16th)	The 500 Hats of Bartholomew Cubbins	George Pal
1943 (16th)	The Dizzy Acrobat	Walter Lantz
1943 (16th)	Greetings Bait!	Leon Schlesinger
1943 (16th)	Imagination	Dave Fleischer
1943 (16th)	Reason and Emotion	Walt Disney
1944 (17th)	**Mouse Trouble**	**Fred Quimby**
1944 (17th)	And to Think That I Saw It on Mulberry Street	George Pal
1944 (17th)	Dog, Cat and Canary	Hugh McCollum
1944 (17th)	Fish Fry	Walter Lantz
1944 (17th)	How to Play Football	Walt Disney
1944 (17th)	My Boy, Johnny	Paul Terry
1944 (17th)	The Swooner Crooner	Leon Schlesinger
1945 (18th)	**Quiet Please!**	**Fred Quimby**
1945 (18th)	Donald's Crime	Walt Disney
1945 (18th)	Jasper and the Beanstalk	George Pal
1945 (18th)	Life with Feathers	Edward Selzer
1945 (18th)	Mighty Mouse in Gypsy Life	Paul Terry
1945 (18th)	The Poet and Peasant	Walter Lantz
1945 (18th)	Rippling Romance	Paul Worth
1946 (19th)	**The Cat Concerto**	**Fred Quimby**
1946 (19th)	John Henry and the Inky-Poo	George Pal
1946 (19th)	Musical Moments from Chopin	Walter Lantz
1946 (19th)	Squatter's Rights	Walt Disney
1946 (19th)	Walky Talky Hawky	Edward Selzer
1947 (20th)	**Tweetie Pie**	**Edward Selzer**
1947 (20th)	Chip an' Dale	Walt Disney
1947 (20th)	Dr. Jekyll and Mr. Mouse	Fred Quimby
1947 (20th)	Pluto's Blue Note	Walt Disney
1947 (20th)	Tubby the Tuba	George Pal
1948 (21st)	**The Little Orphan**	**Fred Quimby**
1948 (21st)	Mickey and the Seal	Walt Disney
1948 (21st)	Mouse Wreckers	Edward Selzer
1948 (21st)	Robin Hoodlum	Stephen Bosustow
1948 (21st)	Tea for Two Hundred	Walt Disney
1949 (22nd)	**For Scent-imental Reasons**	**Edward Selzer**
1949 (22nd)	~~Canary Row~~ (Note: In 1949, Edward Selzer was originally announced as a nominee for Canary Row. However, he withdrew the film from nomination and it did not appear on the final ballot.)	~~Edward Selzer~~
1949 (22nd)	Hatch Up Your Troubles	Fred Quimby
1949 (22nd)	The Magic Fluke	Stephen Bosustow
1949 (22nd)	Toy Tinkers	Walt Disney

=== 1950s ===
Year	Film	Nominees
1950 (23rd)	**Gerald McBoing-Boing**	**Stephen Bosustow**
1950 (23rd)	Jerry's Cousin	Fred Quimby
1950 (23rd)	Trouble Indemnity	Stephen Bosustow
1951 (24th)	**The Two Mouseketeers**	**Fred Quimby**
1951 (24th)	Lambert the Sheepish Lion	Walt Disney
1951 (24th)	Rooty Toot Toot	Stephen Bosustow
1952 (25th)	**Johann Mouse**	**Fred Quimby**
1952 (25th)	Little Johnny Jet	Fred Quimby
1952 (25th)	Madeline	Stephen Bosustow
1952 (25th)	Pink and Blue Blues	Stephen Bosustow
1952 (25th)	Romance of Transportation	Tom Daly
1953 (26th)	**Toot, Whistle, Plunk and Boom**	**Walt Disney**
1953 (26th)	Christopher Crumpet	Stephen Bosustow
1953 (26th)	From A to Z-Z-Z-Z	Edward Selzer
1953 (26th)	Rugged Bear	Walt Disney
1953 (26th)	The Tell-Tale Heart	Stephen Bosustow
1954 (27th)	**When Magoo Flew**	**Stephen Bosustow**
1954 (27th)	Crazy Mixed Up Pup	Walter Lantz
1954 (27th)	Pigs Is Pigs	Walt Disney
1954 (27th)	Sandy Claws	Edward Selzer
1954 (27th)	Touché, Pussy Cat!	Fred Quimby
1955 (28th)	**Speedy Gonzales**	**Edward Selzer**
1955 (28th)	Good Will to Men	Fred Quimby, William Hanna & Joseph Barbera
1955 (28th)	The Legend of Rockabye Point	Walter Lantz
1955 (28th)	No Hunting	Walt Disney
1956 (29th)	**Magoo's Puddle Jumper**	**Stephen Bosustow**
1956 (29th)	Gerald McBoing-Boing on Planet Moo	Stephen Bosustow
1956 (29th)	The Jaywalker	Stephen Bosustow
1957 (30th)	**Birds Anonymous**	**Edward Selzer**
1957 (30th)	One Droopy Knight	William Hanna & Joseph Barbera
1957 (30th)	Tabasco Road	Edward Selzer
1957 (30th)	Trees and Jamaica Daddy	Stephen Bosustow
1957 (30th)	The Truth About Mother Goose	Walt Disney
1958 (31st)	**Knighty Knight Bugs**	**John W. Burton**
1958 (31st)	Paul Bunyan	Walt Disney
1958 (31st)	Sidney's Family Tree	William M. Weiss
1959 (32nd)	**Moonbird**	**John Hubley**
1959 (32nd)	Mexicali Shmoes	John W. Burton
1959 (32nd)	Noah's Ark	Walt Disney
1959 (32nd)	The Violinist	Ernest Pintoff

=== 1960s ===
Year	Film	Nominees
1960 (33rd)	**Munro**	**William L. Snyder**
1960 (33rd)	Goliath II	Walt Disney
1960 (33rd)	High Note	Warner Bros.
1960 (33rd)	Mouse and Garden	Warner Bros.
1960 (33rd)	A Place in the Sun	František Vystrčil
1961 (34th)	**Ersatz**	**Zagreb Film**
1961 (34th)	Aquamania	Walt Disney
1961 (34th)	Beep Prepared	Chuck Jones
1961 (34th)	Nelly's Folly	Chuck Jones
1961 (34th)	The Pied Piper of Guadalupe	Friz Freleng
1962 (35th)	**The Hole**	**Faith & John Hubley**
1962 (35th)	Icarus Montgolfier Wright	Jules Engel
1962 (35th)	Now Hear This	Warner Bros.
1962 (35th)	Self Defense—For Cowards	William L. Snyder
1962 (35th)	A Symposium on Popular Songs	Walt Disney
1963 (36th)	**The Critic**	**Ernest Pintoff**
1963 (36th)	Automania 2000	John Halas
1963 (36th)	The Game (Igra)	Dušan Vukotić
1963 (36th)	My Financial Career	Tom Daly & Colin Low
1963 (36th)	Pianissimo	Carmen D'Avino
1964 (37th)	**The Pink Phink**	**David H. DePatie & Friz Freleng**
1964 (37th)	Christmas Cracker	National Film Board of Canada
1964 (37th)	Here's Nudnik	William L. Snyder
1964 (37th)	How to Avoid Friendship	William L. Snyder
1965 (38th)	**The Dot and the Line**	**Les Goldman & Chuck Jones**
1965 (38th)	Clay or The Origin of Species	Eli Noyes
1965 (38th)	The Thieving Magpie	Emanuele Luzzati
1966 (39th)	**A Herb Alpert and the Tijuana Brass Double Feature**	**Faith & John Hubley**
1966 (39th)	The Drag	Wolf Koenig & Robert Verrall
1966 (39th)	The Pink Blueprint	David H. DePatie & Friz Freleng
1967 (40th)	**The Box**	**Fred Wolf**
1967 (40th)	Hypothese Beta	Jean-Charles Meunier
1967 (40th)	What on Earth!	Robert Verrall & Wolf Koenig
1968 (41st)	**Winnie the Pooh and the Blustery Day**	**Walt Disney (p.n.)**
1968 (41st)	The House That Jack Built	Wolf Koenig & Jim MacKay
1968 (41st)	The Magic Pear Tree	Jimmy Murakami
1968 (41st)	Windy Day	Faith & John Hubley
1969 (42nd)	**It's Tough to Be a Bird**	**Ward Kimball**
1969 (42nd)	Of Men and Demons	Faith & John Hubley
1969 (42nd)	Walking	Ryan Larkin

=== 1970s ===
Year	Film	Nominees
1970 (43rd)	**Is It Always Right to Be Right?**	**Nick Bosustow**
1970 (43rd)	The Further Adventures of Uncle Sam	Dale Case & Robert Mitchell
1970 (43rd)	The Shepherd	Cameron Guess
1971 (44th)	**The Crunch Bird**	**Ted Petok**
1971 (44th)	Evolution	Michael Mills
1971 (44th)	The Selfish Giant	Gerald Potterton & Peter Sander
1972 (45th)	**A Christmas Carol**	**Richard Williams**
1972 (45th)	Kama Sutra Rides Again	Bob Godfrey
1972 (45th)	Tup Tup	Nedeljko Dragić
1973 (46th)	**Frank Film**	**Frank Mouris**
1973 (46th)	The Legend of John Henry	David Adams & Nick Bosustow
1973 (46th)	Pulcinella	Guilo Gianini & Emanuele Luzzati
1974 (47th)	**Closed Mondays**	**Bob Gardiner & Will Vinton**
1974 (47th)	The Family That Dwelt Apart	Yvon Mallette & Robert Verrall
1974 (47th)	Hunger	Peter Foldes & René Jodoin
1974 (47th)	Voyage to Next	Faith & John Hubley
1974 (47th)	Winnie the Pooh and Tigger Too	Wolfgang Reitherman
1975 (48th)	**Great**	**Bob Godfrey**
1975 (48th)	Kick Me	Robert Swarthe
1975 (48th)	Monsieur Pointu	René Jodoin, André Leduc & Bernard Longpré
1975 (48th)	Sisyphus	Marcell Jankovics
1976 (49th)	**Leisure**	**Suzanne Baker**
1976 (49th)	Dedalo	Manfredo Manfredi
1976 (49th)	The Street	Guy Glover & Caroline Leaf
1977 (50th)	**The Sand Castle**	**Co Hoedeman**
1977 (50th)	The Bead Game	Ishu Patel
1977 (50th)	A Doonesbury Special	Faith, John Hubley (p.n.) & Garry Trudeau
1977 (50th)	Jimmy the C	Robert Grossman, Jimmy Picker & Craig Whitaker
1978 (51st)	**Special Delivery**	**Eunice Macaulay & John Weldon**
1978 (51st)	Oh My Darling	Nico Crama
1978 (51st)	Rip Van Winkle	Will Vinton
1979 (52nd)	**Every Child**	**Derek Lamb**
1979 (52nd)	Dream Doll	Bob Godfrey & Zlatko Grgić
1979 (52nd)	It's So Nice to Have a Wolf Around the House	Paul Fierlinger

=== 1980s ===
Year	Film	Nominees
1980 (53rd)	**The Fly**	**Ferenc Rofusz**
1980 (53rd)	All Nothing	Frédéric Back
1980 (53rd)	History of the World in Three Minutes Flat	Michael Mills
1981 (54th)	**Crac**	**Frédéric Back**
1981 (54th)	The Creation	Will Vinton
1981 (54th)	The Tender Tale of Cinderella Penguin	Janet Perlman
1982 (55th)	**Tango**	**Zbigniew Rybczyński**
1982 (55th)	The Great Cognito	Will Vinton
1982 (55th)	The Snowman	John Coates & Dianne Jackson
1983 (56th)	**Sundae in New York**	**Jimmy Picker**
1983 (56th)	Mickey's Christmas Carol	Burny Mattinson
1983 (56th)	Sound of Sunshine – Sound of Rain	Eda Godel Hallinan
1984 (57th)	**Charade**	**Jon Minnis**
1984 (57th)	Doctor DeSoto	Morton Schindel & Michael Sporn
1984 (57th)	Paradise	Ishu Patel
1985 (58th)	**Anna & Bella**	**Cilia van Dijk**
1985 (58th)	The Big Snit	Richard Condie & Michael Scott
1985 (58th)	Second Class Mail	Alison Snowden
1986 (59th)	**A Greek Tragedy**	**Willem Thijsen & Linda Van Tulden**
1986 (59th)	The Frog, the Dog and the Devil	Bob Stenhouse
1986 (59th)	Luxo Jr.	John Lasseter & Bill Reeves
1987 (60th)	**The Man Who Planted Trees**	**Frédéric Back**
1987 (60th)	George and Rosemary	Eunice Macaulay
1987 (60th)	Your Face	Bill Plympton
1988 (61st)	**Tin Toy**	**John Lasseter & Bill Reeves**
1988 (61st)	The Cat Came Back	Cordell Barker
1988 (61st)	Technological Threat	Brian Jennings & Bill Kroyer
1989 (62nd)	**Balance**	**Wolfgang & Christoph Lauenstein**
1989 (62nd)	The Cow	Aleksandr Petrov
1989 (62nd)	The Hill Farm	Mark Baker

=== 1990s ===
Year	Film	Nominees
1990 (63rd)	**Creature Comforts**	**Nick Park**
1990 (63rd)	A Grand Day Out	Nick Park
1990 (63rd)	Grasshoppers	Bruno Bozzetto
1991 (64th)	**Manipulation**	**Daniel Greaves**
1991 (64th)	Blackfly	Christopher Hinton
1991 (64th)	Strings	Wendy Tilby
1992 (65th)	**Mona Lisa Descending a Staircase**	**Joan C. Gratz**
1992 (65th)	Adam	Peter Lord
1992 (65th)	Reci, Reci, Reci...	Michaela Pavlátová
1992 (65th)	The Sandman	Paul Berry
1992 (65th)	Screen Play	Barry Purves
1993 (66th)	**The Wrong Trousers**	**Nick Park**
1993 (66th)	Blindscape	Stephen Palmer
1993 (66th)	The Mighty River	Frédéric Back & Hubert Tison
1993 (66th)	Small Talk	Kevin Baldwin & Bob Godfrey
1993 (66th)	The Village	Mark Baker
1994 (67th)	**Bob's Birthday**	**David Fine & Alison Snowden**
1994 (67th)	The Big Story	David Stoten & Tim Watts
1994 (67th)	The Janitor	Vanessa Schwartz
1994 (67th)	The Monk and the Fish	Michaël Dudok de Wit
1994 (67th)	Triangle	Erica Russell
1995 (68th)	**A Close Shave**	**Nick Park**
1995 (68th)	The Chicken from Outer Space	John R. Dilworth
1995 (68th)	The End	Robin Bargar & Chris Landreth
1995 (68th)	Gagarin	Alexij Kharitidi
1995 (68th)	Runaway Brain	Chris Bailey
1996 (69th)	**Quest**	**Tyron Montgomery & Thomas Stellmach**
1996 (69th)	Canhead	Timothy Hittle & Chris Peterson
1996 (69th)	La Salla	Richard Condie
1996 (69th)	Wat's Pig	Peter Lord
1997 (70th)	**Geri's Game**	**Jan Pinkava**
1997 (70th)	Famous Fred	Joanna Quinn
1997 (70th)	The Mermaid	Aleksandr Petrov
1997 (70th)	The Old Lady and the Pigeons	Sylvain Chomet
1997 (70th)	Redux Riding Hood	Steve Moore
1998 (71st)	**Bunny**	**Chris Wedge**
1998 (71st)	The Canterbury Tales	Christopher Grace & Jonathan Myerson
1998 (71st)	Jolly Roger	Mark Baker
1998 (71st)	More	Steven Kalafer & Mark Osborne
1998 (71st)	When Life Departs	Stefan Fjeldmark & Karsten Kiilerich
1999 (72nd)	**The Old Man and the Sea**	**Aleksandr Petrov**
1999 (72nd)	3 Misses	Paul Driessen
1999 (72nd)	Humdrum	Peter Peake
1999 (72nd)	My Grandmother Ironed the King's Shirts	Torill Kove
1999 (72nd)	When the Day Breaks	Wendy Tilby and Amanda Forbis

=== 2000s ===
Year	Film	Nominees
2000 (73rd)	**Father and Daughter**	**Michaël Dudok de Wit**
2000 (73rd)	The Periwig-Maker	Steffen and Annette Schäffler
2000 (73rd)	Rejected	Don Hertzfeldt
2001 (74th)	**For the Birds**	**Ralph Eggleston**
2001 (74th)	Fifty Percent Grey	Seamus Byrne and Ruairí Robinson
2001 (74th)	Give Up Yer Aul Sins	Cathal Gaffney and Darragh O'Connell
2001 (74th)	Strange Invaders	Cordell Barker
2001 (74th)	Stubble Trouble	Joseph E. Merideth
2002 (75th)	**The ChubbChubbs!**	**Eric Armstrong**
2002 (75th)	The Cathedral	Tomek Baginski
2002 (75th)	Das Rad	Chris Stenner and Heidi Wittlinger
2002 (75th)	Mike's New Car	Pete Docter and Roger L. Gould
2002 (75th)	Mt. Head	Kōji Yamamura
2003 (76th)	**Harvie Krumpet**	**Adam Elliot**
2003 (76th)	Boundin'	Bud Luckey
2003 (76th)	Destino	Roy E. Disney and Dominique Monféry
2003 (76th)	Gone Nutty	John C. Donkin and Carlos Saldanha
2003 (76th)	Nibbles	Chris Hinton
2004 (77th)	**Ryan**	**Chris Landreth**
2004 (77th)	Birthday Boy	Andrew Gregory and Sejong Park
2004 (77th)	Gopher Broke	Jeff Fowler and Tim Miller
2004 (77th)	Guard Dog	Bill Plympton
2004 (77th)	Lorenzo	Baker Bloodworth and Mike Gabriel
2005 (78th)	**The Moon and the Son: An Imagined Conversation**	**John Canemaker and Peggy Stern**
2005 (78th)	9	Shane Acker
2005 (78th)	Badgered	Sharon Colman
2005 (78th)	The Mysterious Geographic Explorations of Jasper Morello	Anthony Lucas
2005 (78th)	One Man Band	Mark Andrews and Andrew Jimenez
2006 (79th)	**The Danish Poet**	**Torill Kove**
2006 (79th)	Lifted	Gary Rydstrom
2006 (79th)	The Little Matchgirl	Roger Allers and Don Hahn
2006 (79th)	Maestro	Géza M. Tóth
2006 (79th)	No Time for Nuts	Chris Renaud and Mike Thurmeier
2007 (80th)	**Peter and the Wolf**	**Suzie Templeton and Hugh Welchman**
2007 (80th)	Even Pigeons Go to Heaven	Samuel Tourneux and Simon Vanesse
2007 (80th)	I Met the Walrus	Josh Raskin
2007 (80th)	Madame Tutli-Putli	Chris Lavis and Maciek Szczerbowski
2007 (80th)	My Love	Aleksandr Petrov
2008 (81st)	**La Maison en Petits Cubes**	**Kunio Katō**
2008 (81st)	Lavatory – Lovestory	Konstantin Bronzit
2008 (81st)	Oktapodi	Thierry Marchand and Emud Mokhberi
2008 (81st)	Presto	Doug Sweetland
2008 (81st)	This Way Up	Adam Foulkes and Alan Smith
2009 (82nd)	**Logorama**	**Nicolas Schmerkin**
2009 (82nd)	French Roast	Fabrice Joubert
2009 (82nd)	Granny O'Grimm's Sleeping Beauty	Darragh O'Connell and Nicky Phelan
2009 (82nd)	The Lady and the Reaper	Javier Recio Gracia
2009 (82nd)	A Matter of Loaf and Death	Nick Park

=== 2010s ===
Year	Film	Nominees
2010 (83rd)	**The Lost Thing**	**Andrew Ruhemann and Shaun Tan**
2010 (83rd)	Day and Night	Teddy Newton
2010 (83rd)	The Gruffalo	Max Lang and Jakob Schuh
2010 (83rd)	Let's Pollute	Geefwee Boedoe
2010 (83rd)	Madagascar, a Journey Diary	Bastien Dubois
2011 (84th)	**The Fantastic Flying Books of Mr. Morris Lessmore**	**William Joyce and Brandon Oldenburg**
2011 (84th)	La Luna	Enrico Casarosa
2011 (84th)	A Morning Stroll	Sue Goffe and Grant Orchard
2011 (84th)	Sunday	Patrick Doyon
2011 (84th)	Wild Life	Amanda Forbis and Wendy Tilby
2012 (85th)	**Paperman**	**John Kahrs**
2012 (85th)	Adam and Dog	Minkyu Lee
2012 (85th)	Fresh Guacamole	PES
2012 (85th)	Head Over Heels	Fodhla Cronin O'Reilly and Timothy Reckart
2012 (85th)	The Longest Daycare	David Silverman
2013 (86th)	**Mr Hublot**	**Laurent Witz and Alexandre Espigares**
2013 (86th)	Feral	Daniel Sousa and Dan Golden
2013 (86th)	Get a Horse!	Lauren MacMullan and Dorothy McKim
2013 (86th)	Possessions	Shuhei Morita
2013 (86th)	Room on the Broom	Max Lang and Jan Lachauer
2014 (87th)	**Feast**	**Patrick Osborne and Kristina Reed**
2014 (87th)	The Bigger Picture	Christopher Hees and Daisy Jacobs
2014 (87th)	The Dam Keeper	Robert Kondo and Dice Tsutsumi
2014 (87th)	Me and My Moulton	Torill Kove
2014 (87th)	A Single Life	Joris Oprins
2015 (88th)	**Bear Story**	**Pato Escala Pierart and Gabriel Osorio Vargas**
2015 (88th)	Prologue	Imogen Sutton and Richard Williams
2015 (88th)	Sanjay's Super Team	Sanjay Patel and Nicole Paradis Grindle
2015 (88th)	We Can't Live Without Cosmos	Konstantin Bronzit
2015 (88th)	World of Tomorrow	Don Hertzfeldt
2016 (89th)	**Piper**	**Alan Barillaro and Marc Sondheimer**
2016 (89th)	Blind Vaysha	Theodore Ushev
2016 (89th)	Borrowed Time	Andrew Coats and Lou Hamou-Lhadj
2016 (89th)	Pear Cider and Cigarettes	Cara Speller and Robert Valley
2016 (89th)	Pearl	Patrick Osborne
2017 (90th)	**Dear Basketball**	**Glen Keane and Kobe Bryant**
2017 (90th)	Garden Party	Victor Caire and Gabriel Grapperon
2017 (90th)	Lou	Dave Mullins and Dana Murray
2017 (90th)	Negative Space	Ru Kuwahata and Max Porter
2017 (90th)	Revolting Rhymes	Jakob Schuh and Jan Lachauer
2018 (91st)	**Bao**	**Becky Neiman-Cobb and Domee Shi**
2018 (91st)	Animal Behaviour	David Fine and Alison Snowden
2018 (91st)	Late Afternoon	Louise Bagnall and Nuria González Blanco
2018 (91st)	One Small Step	Andrew Chesworth and Bobby Pontillas
2018 (91st)	Weekends	Trevor Jimenez
2019 (92nd)	**Hair Love**	**Matthew A. Cherry and Karen Rupert Toliver**
2019 (92nd)	Daughter	Daria Kashcheeva
2019 (92nd)	Kitbull	Kathryn Hendrickson and Rosana Sullivan
2019 (92nd)	Mémorable	Bruno Collet and Jean-François Le Corre
2019 (92nd)	Sister	Siqi Song

=== 2020s ===
Year	Film	Nominees
2020/21 (93rd)	**If Anything Happens I Love You**	**Michael Govier and Will McCormack**
2020/21 (93rd)	Burrow	Michael Capbarat and Madeline Sharafian
2020/21 (93rd)	Genius Loci	Adrien Mérigeau and Amaury Ovise
2020/21 (93rd)	Opera	Erick Oh
2020/21 (93rd)	Yes-People	Arnar Gunnarsson and Gísli Darri Halldórsson
2021 (94th)	**The Windshield Wiper**	**Alberto Mielgo and Leo Sanchez**
2021 (94th)	Affairs of the Art	Joanna Quinn and Les Mills
2021 (94th)	Bestia	Hugo Covarrubias and Tevo Díaz
2021 (94th)	Boxballet	Anton Dyakov
2021 (94th)	Robin Robin	Dan Ojari and Mikey Please
2022 (95th)	**The Boy, the Mole, the Fox and the Horse**	**Charlie Mackesy and Matthew Freud**
2022 (95th)	The Flying Sailor	Amanda Forbis & Wendy Tilby
2022 (95th)	Ice Merchants	João Gonzalez and Bruno Caetano
2022 (95th)	My Year of Dicks	Sara Gunnarsdóttir and Pamela Ribon
2022 (95th)	An Ostrich Told Me the World Is Fake and I Think I Believe It	Lachlan Pendragon
2023 (96th)	**War Is Over! Inspired by the Music of John & Yoko**	**Dave Mullins and Brad Booker**
2023 (96th)	Letter to a Pig	Tal Kantor and Amit R. Gicelter
2023 (96th)	Ninety-Five Senses	Jared Hess and Jerusha Hess
2023 (96th)	Our Uniform	Yegane Moghaddam
2023 (96th)	Pachyderme	Stéphanie Clément and Marc Rius
2024 (97th)	**In the Shadow of the Cypress**	**Shirin Sohani and Hossein Molayemi**
2024 (97th)	Beautiful Men	Nicolas Keppens and Brecht Van Elslande
2024 (97th)	Magic Candies	Daisuke Nishio and Takashi Washio
2024 (97th)	Wander to Wonder	Nina Gantz and Stienette Bosklopper
2024 (97th)	Yuck!	Loïc Espuche and Juliette Marquet
2025 (98th)	**The Girl Who Cried Pearls**	**Chris Lavis and Maciek Szczerbowski**
2025 (98th)	Butterfly	Florence Miailhe and Ron Dyens
2025 (98th)	Forevergreen	Nathan Engelhardt and Jeremy Spears
2025 (98th)	Retirement Plan	John Kelly and Andrew Freedman
2025 (98th)	The Three Sisters	Konstantin Bronzit

== See also ==
- List of submissions for the Academy Award for Best Animated Short Film
- Academy Award for Best Animated Feature
  - List of submissions for the Academy Award for Best Animated Feature
- List of animation awards
- BAFTA Award for Best Short Film
- The 50 Greatest Cartoons: As Selected by 1,000 Animation Professionals
- List of animated short films
- List of Academy Award–nominated films
- Academy Award for Best Live Action Short Film
- List of Academy Awards for Walt Disney
- Arthouse animation
- Independent animation
- Adult animation

== Superlatives ==
For this Academy Award category, the following superlatives emerge:

Most awards	Walt Disney	12 awards
Most nominations	Walt Disney	39 nominations
Most consecutive years	Walt Disney	8 years (1931–1939)
Oldest winner	Walt Disney	67 years, 130 days (posthumously, for Winnie the Pooh and the Blustery Day)
Youngest winner	Bob Gardiner	24 years, 20 days (for Closed Mondays)
Shortest winning film	The Crunch Bird (1971)	2 minutes and 32 seconds
Shortest nominated film	Fresh Guacamole (2012)	1 minute and 40 seconds
Longest winning film	The Boy, the Mole, the Fox and the Horse (2022)	34 minutes and 8 seconds
Longest nominated film	Pear Cider and Cigarettes (2016)	34 minutes and 56 seconds

== Multiple nominations and awards ==
The following is a list of animation studios or animators that earned multiple nominations and awards in this category.

Studio	Nominations	Awards
Disney	51	15
MGM	23	9
National Film Board of Canada	39	7
Warner Bros.	27	5
Pixar	17	5
United Productions of America	14	3
Aardman	9	3
John Hubley and Faith Hubley	7	3
BBC	3	3
Channel 4	6	2
Frédéric Back	4	2
Sony Pictures Animation	2	2
Rembrandt	5	1
Bob Godfrey	4	1
Aleksandr Petrov	4	1
Will Vinton	4	1
Zagreb Film	4	1
Brandon	3	1
Passion Pictures Animation	3	1
Blue Sky	3	1
DePatie-Freleng	2	1
Fred Wolf	2	1
Motionpicker	2	1
Michael Mills	2	1
Dave Mullins	2	1
Pannonia Film Studio	2	1
Stephen Bosustow Productions	2	1
Walter Lantz	10	0
George Pal	7	0
Screen Gems	6	0
National Film & Television School	6	0
Fleischer	4	0
Terrytoons	4	0
Melnitsa	4	0
Pathe Contemporary	3	0
Magic Light	3	0
Mark Baker	3	0
Folimage	3	0
Harman-Ising	2	0
Dago	2	0
Pyramid	2	0
TVC London	2	0
S4C	2	0
Brown Bag	2	0
Halas & Batchelor	2	0
Bill Plympton	2	0
Don Hertzfeldt	2	0
Emanuele Luzzati	2	0
Konstantin Bronzit	2	0
Joanna Quinn	2	0
Sacrebleu Productions	2	0
Ikki Films	2	0
