= Brad Booker =

American producer

- Born: 27 November 1971 (age 54); Springfield, Illinois
- Education: Ringling College of Art and Design
- Occupations: Producer, Founder of ElectroLeague
- Years active: 1995-present

Brad Booker (born 1971) is an American producer and animator, founder of the American animation studio ElectroLeague. Booker is best known for The Iron Giant (1999), The Book of Life (2014) and the animated short film WAR IS OVER! Inspired by the Music of John and Ono (2023), which won the Academy Award for Best Animated Short Film at 96th Academy Awards on January 23, 2024.

== Filmography ==
Year	Title	Producer	Animator	Other	Notes
1998	Quest for Camelot	No	CGI	No	
1999	Stuart Little	No	Yes	No	
1999	The Iron Giant	No	CGI	No	
2001	Osmosis Jones	No	Yes	No	
2002	The Lord of the Rings: The Two Towers	No	Yes	No	
2002	Spider-Man	No	CG character	No	
2003	Apple Jack	No	Yes	No	Short film
2013	Free Birds	No	No	Development	
2014	The Book of Life	Yes	No	No	
2021	Rumble	Yes	No	No	
2023	War Is Over!	Yes	No	No	Short film

== Awards and nominations ==
Year	Award	Category	Nominee(s)	Result	Ref.
2015	Golden Globe Award	Best Animated Feature Film	The Book of Life	Nominated	
2015	Critics' Choice Award	Best Animated Feature	The Book of Life	Nominated	
2015	Annie Award	Best Animated Feature	The Book of Life	Nominated	
2024	Annie Award	Best Animated Short Subject	War Is Over!	Won	
2024	Academy Award	Best Animated Short Film	War Is Over!	Won	
