= Ted Petok =

American animator

Theodore M. Petok (1917–2010) was an American cartoonist, illustrator, animator, and film producer. Joe Petrovich, Len Maxwell, and he won the Academy Award for Best Animated Short Film in 1972 for The Crunch Bird.

== Career ==
After graduating from school in 1934, Petok attended an art school in Chicago, but stayed there only six months and then worked as a cartoonist for various New York newspapers. In 1935, he returned to Detroit, where he worked as an advertising artist for a local advertising company. After the end of the Second World War - from 1942 to 1946, he was in the US Army Signal Corps and most recently held the highest rank of captain - Petok opened a studio for advertising graphics in Detroit and specialized in animated advertising.

Petok soon turned completely to animation, initially working at Earl Klein's animation studio, Animation Inc., and eventually joining Ernest Pintoff's Pintoff Studios. In 1969, Petok founded his own animation film studio, Ted Petok Studios, which he renamed Crunch Bird Studios in 1971. He concentrated on traditional hand-drawn animation and, in addition to commercials, also made humorous short cartoons.

Together with Len Maxwell (dubbing) and Joe Petrovich (animation), they created the three-minute animated film The Crunch Bird, which Petok submitted to the Oscar competition as a producer on the advice of a cinema operator from Detroit. The film won the 1971 Academy Award for Best Animated Short Film. In 1975, Crunch Bird II was made as a sequel; In 1981, numerous other short films about the Crunch Bird were released. Petok produced and animated over two dozen cartoons, created animations for Sesame Street and The Electric Company, and numerous commercials. In 1989, he gave Crunch Bird Studios to his eldest son.

== Filmography ==
- 1971: The Crunch Bird
- 1974: The Mad Baker
- 1975: Crunch Bird II
- 1975: Yeecch
- 1975: Stash
- 1976: The Golfer
- 1981: Yetta the Yenta
- 1981: The Geneticist
- 1981: The Hospital
- 1981: Parrot
- 1981: Charm School
- 1981: You Dirty Bird
- 1981: The Execution
- 1981: The Guru
- 1981: Indians
- 1981: Kink Konk
- 1981: Love
- 1981: Missing You
- 1981: Pet Shop
- 1981: Pollution
- 1981: The Psychiatrist
- 1981: Little Red Riding Hood
- 1981: The Russians
- 1981: Talking Bird
- 1981: Zoo

== Bibliography ==
- Theodore (Ted) Petok. In: Jeff Lenburg: Who's who in animated cartoons. Applause, New York 2006, pp. 284–285.
- Joe Rossiter: Ted Petok: Cartoonist won Oscar in '71 for short film. In: Detroit Free Press April 22, 2010, p. 17.
