= 96th Academy Awards =

- Official poster
- Date: March 10, 2024
- Site: Dolby Theatre; Hollywood, Los Angeles, California, U.S.
- Hosted by: Jimmy Kimmel
- Preshow hosts: Julianne Hough; Vanessa Hudgens
- Produced by: Raj Kapoor; Katy Mullan
- Directed by: Hamish Hamilton

Highlights
- Best Picture: Oppenheimer
- Most awards: Oppenheimer (7)
- Most nominations: Oppenheimer (13)

TV in the United States
- Network: ABC
- Duration: 3 hours, 23 minutes
- Ratings: 19.49 million; 9.9% (Nielsen ratings)

The 96th Academy Awards ceremony, presented by the Academy of Motion Picture Arts and Sciences (AMPAS), took place on March 10, 2024, at the Dolby Theatre in Hollywood, Los Angeles. During the gala, the AMPAS presented Academy Awards (commonly referred to as Oscars) in 23 categories honoring films released in 2023. The ceremony, televised in the United States by ABC, was produced by Raj Kapoor and Katy Mullan, and was directed by Hamish Hamilton. Comedian Jimmy Kimmel hosted the show for the fourth time. He first presided over the 89th ceremony held in 2017, and had most recently hosted the previous year's ceremony.

In related events, the Academy held its 14th Governors Awards ceremony at the Ray Dolby Ballroom of the Ovation Hollywood complex in Hollywood, on January 9, 2024. The Academy Scientific and Technical Awards were presented by host Natasha Lyonne on February 23, 2024, in a ceremony at the Academy Museum of Motion Pictures in Los Angeles.

Oppenheimer won seven awards, including Best Picture. Other winners included Poor Things with four awards, The Zone of Interest with two, and 20 Days in Mariupol, American Fiction, Anatomy of a Fall, Barbie, The Boy and the Heron, Godzilla Minus One, The Holdovers, The Last Repair Shop, War Is Over!, and The Wonderful Story of Henry Sugar with one. The telecast drew 19.49 million viewers in the United States.

== Winners and nominees ==
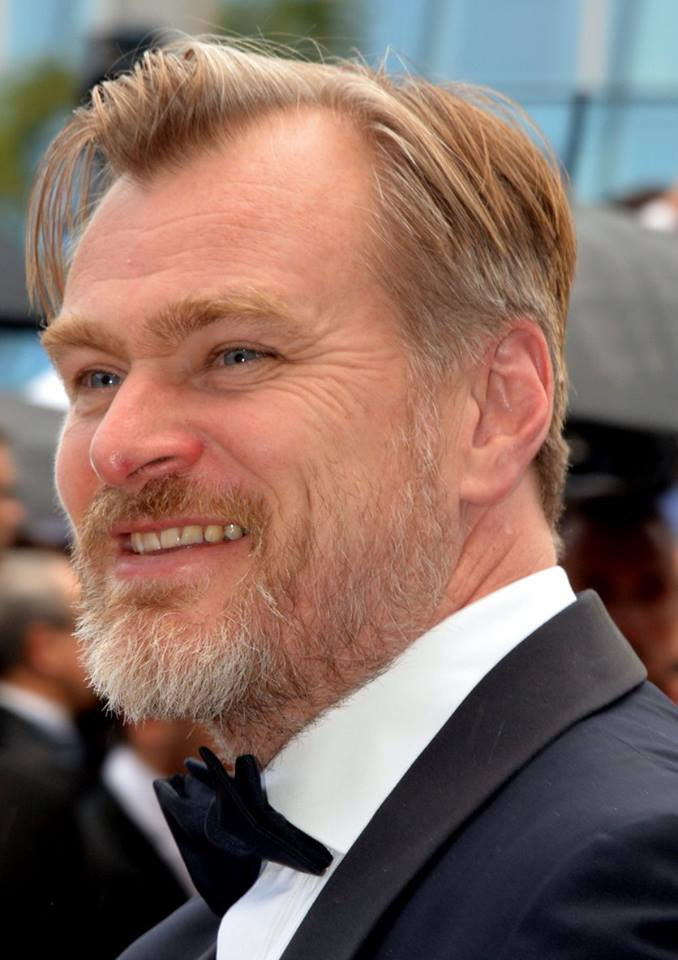
Christopher Nolan, Best Picture co-winner and Best Director winner

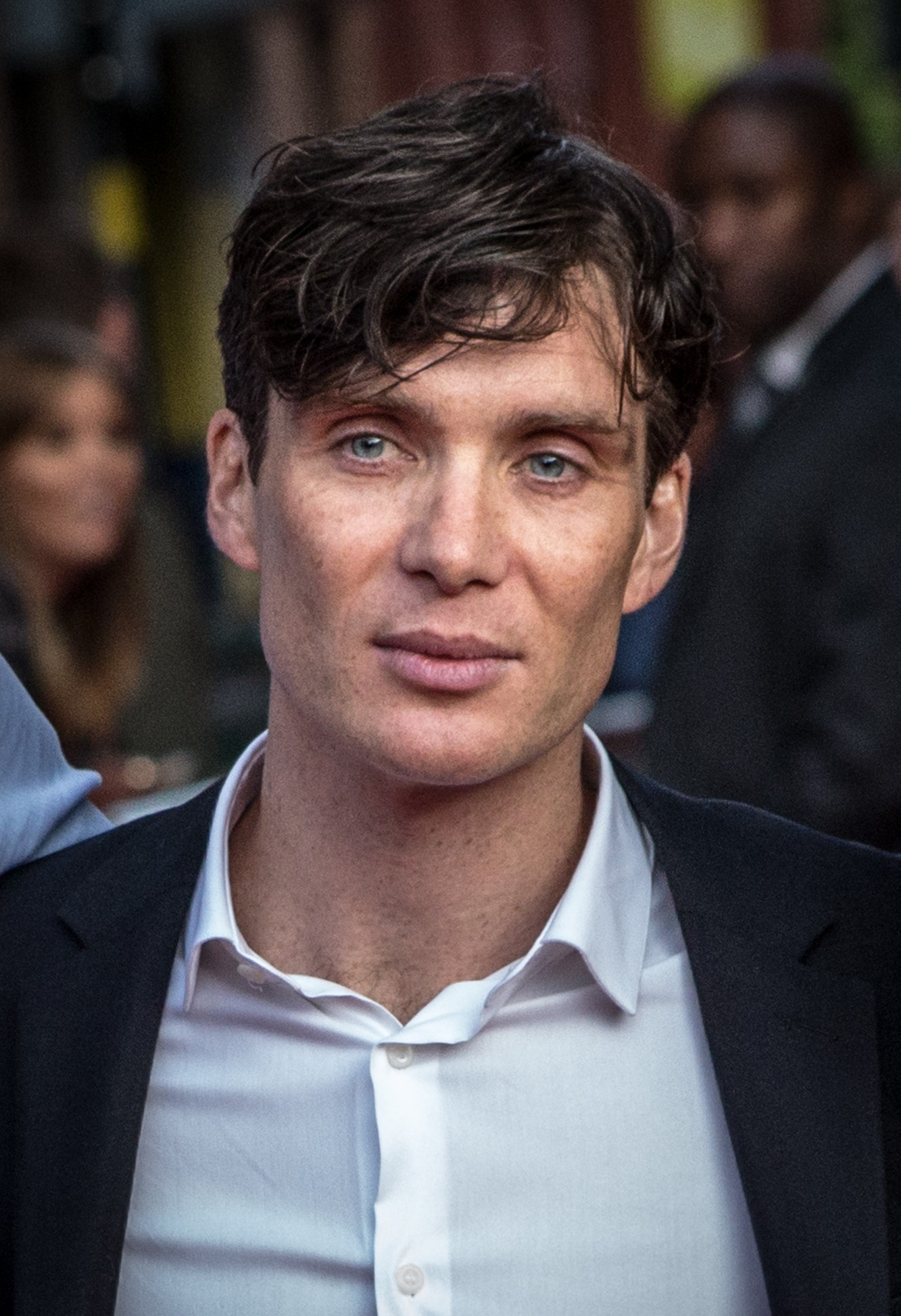
Cillian Murphy, Best Actor winner

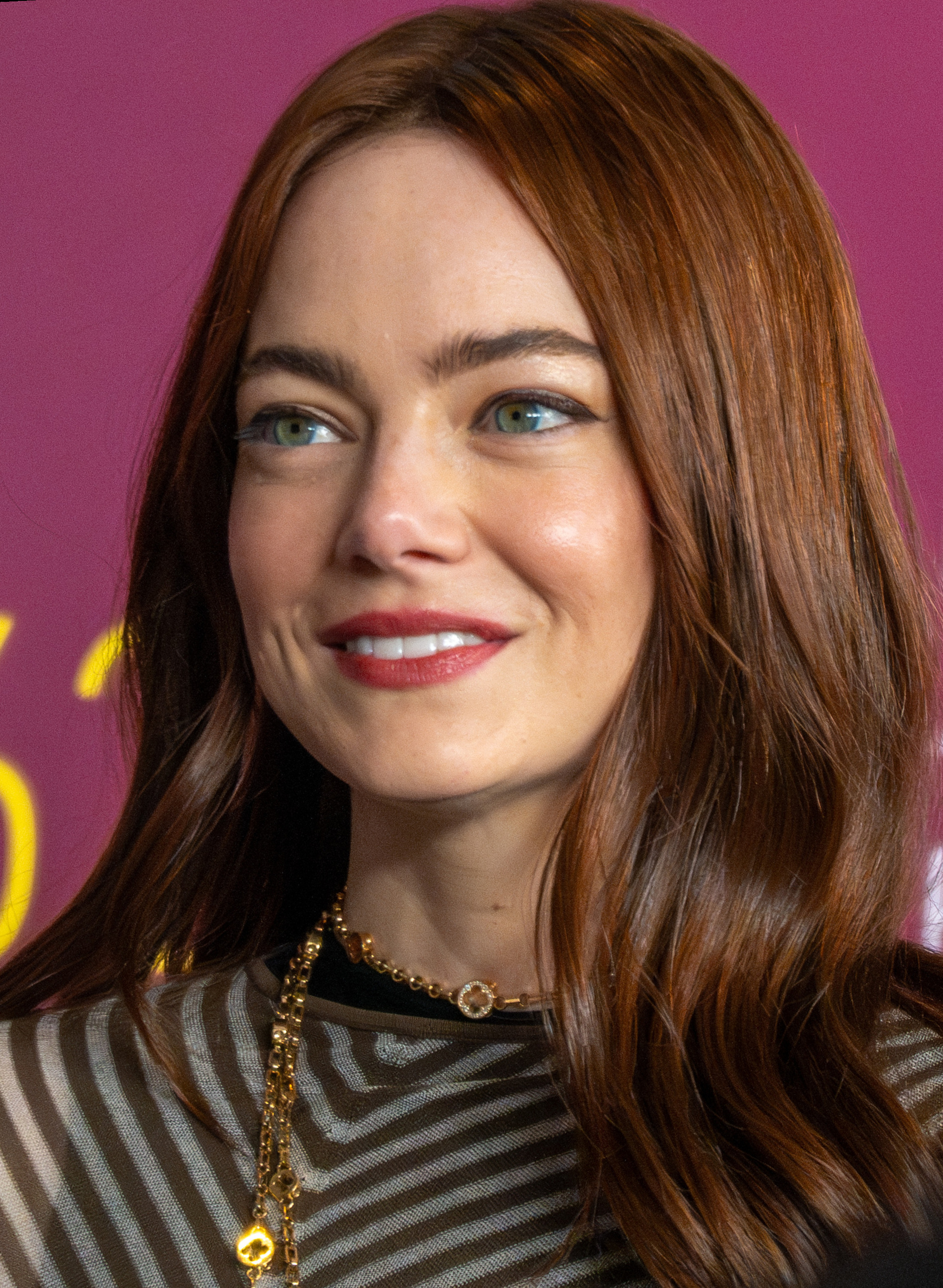
Emma Stone, Best Actress winner

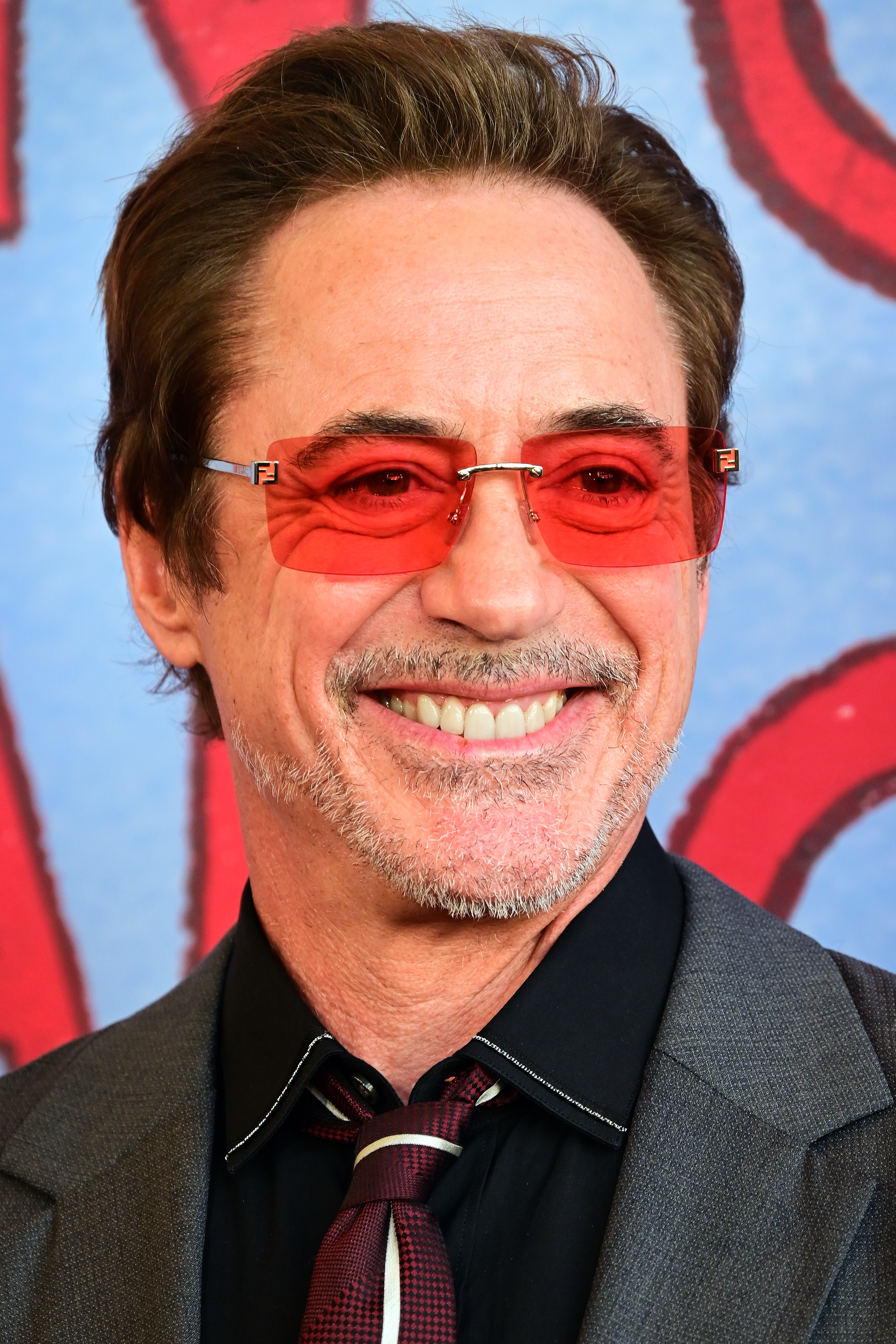
Robert Downey Jr., Best Supporting Actor winner

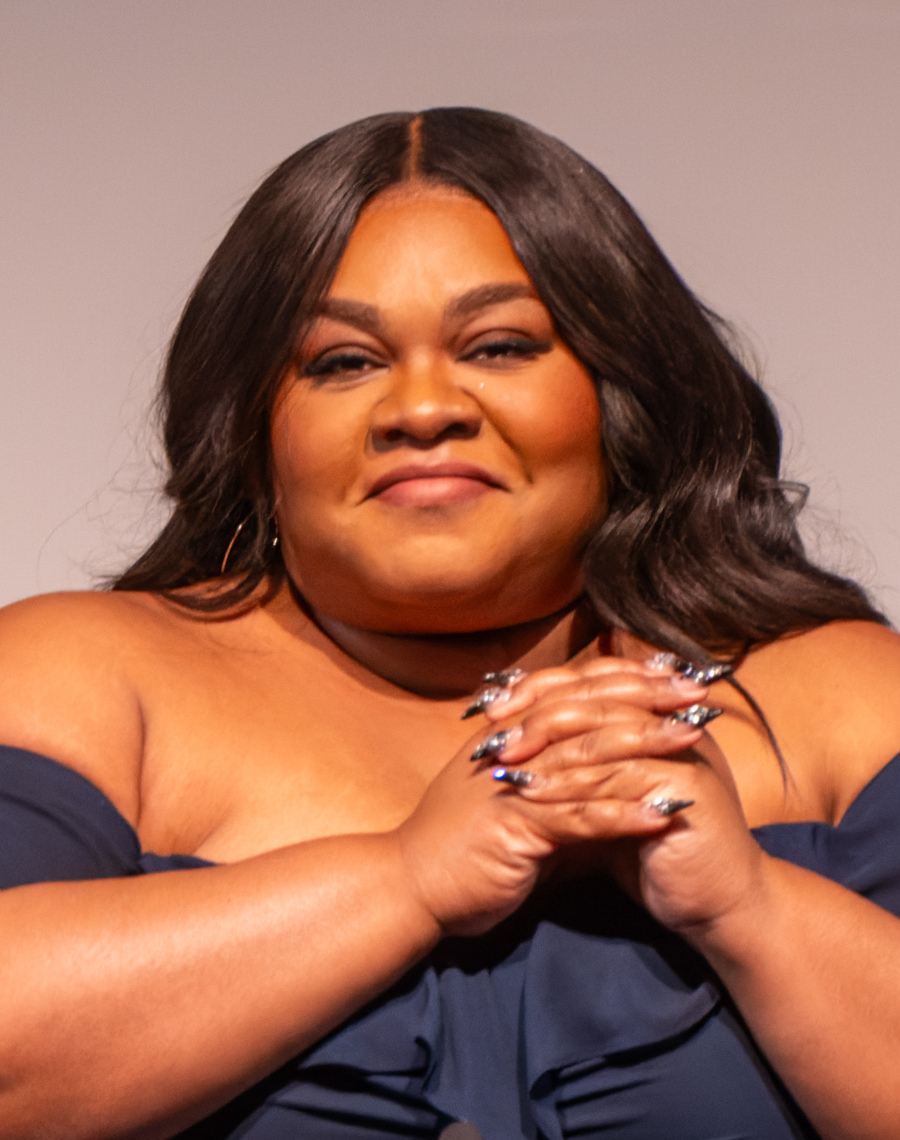
Da'Vine Joy Randolph, Best Supporting Actress winner

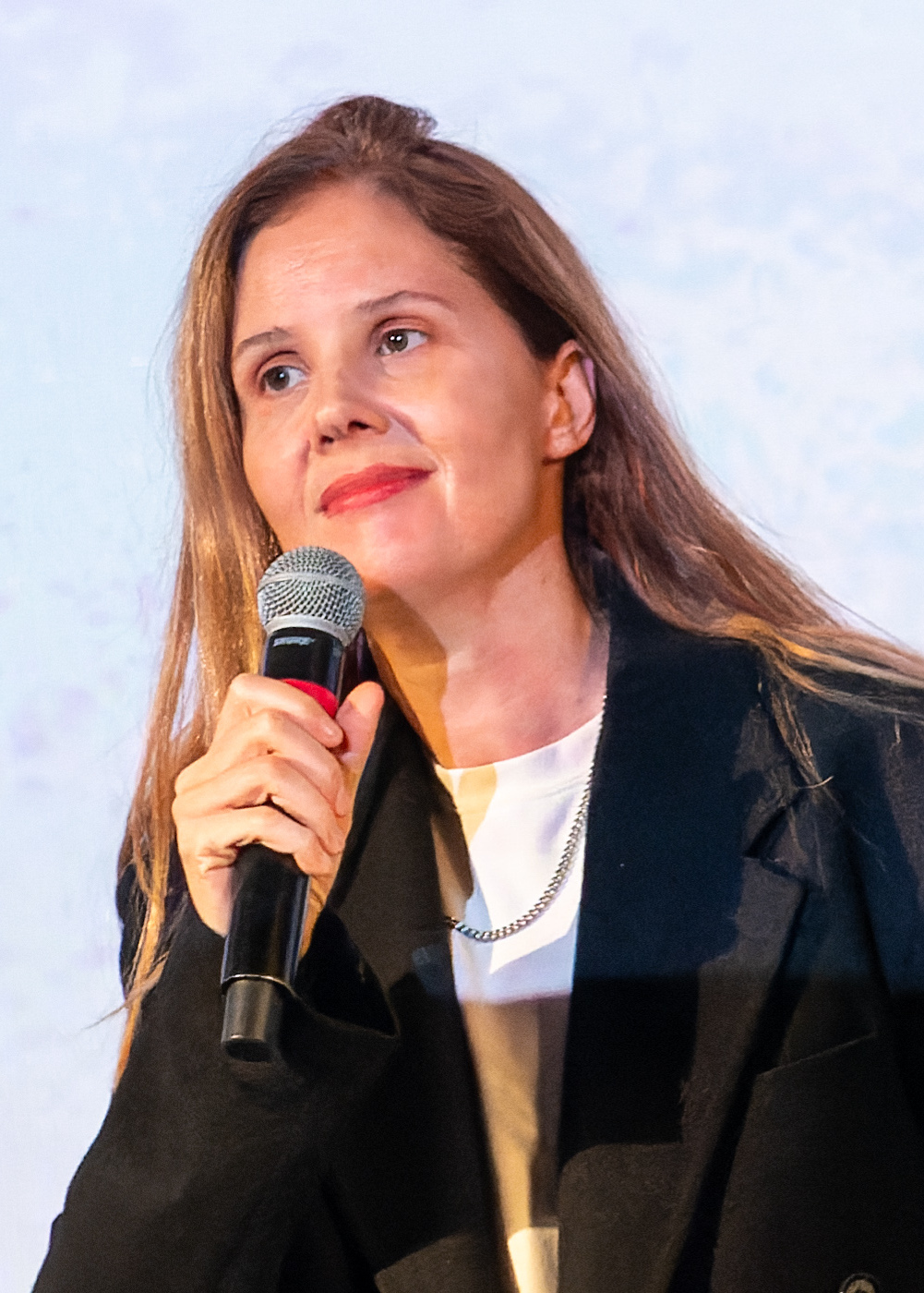
Justine Triet, Best Original Screenplay co-winner

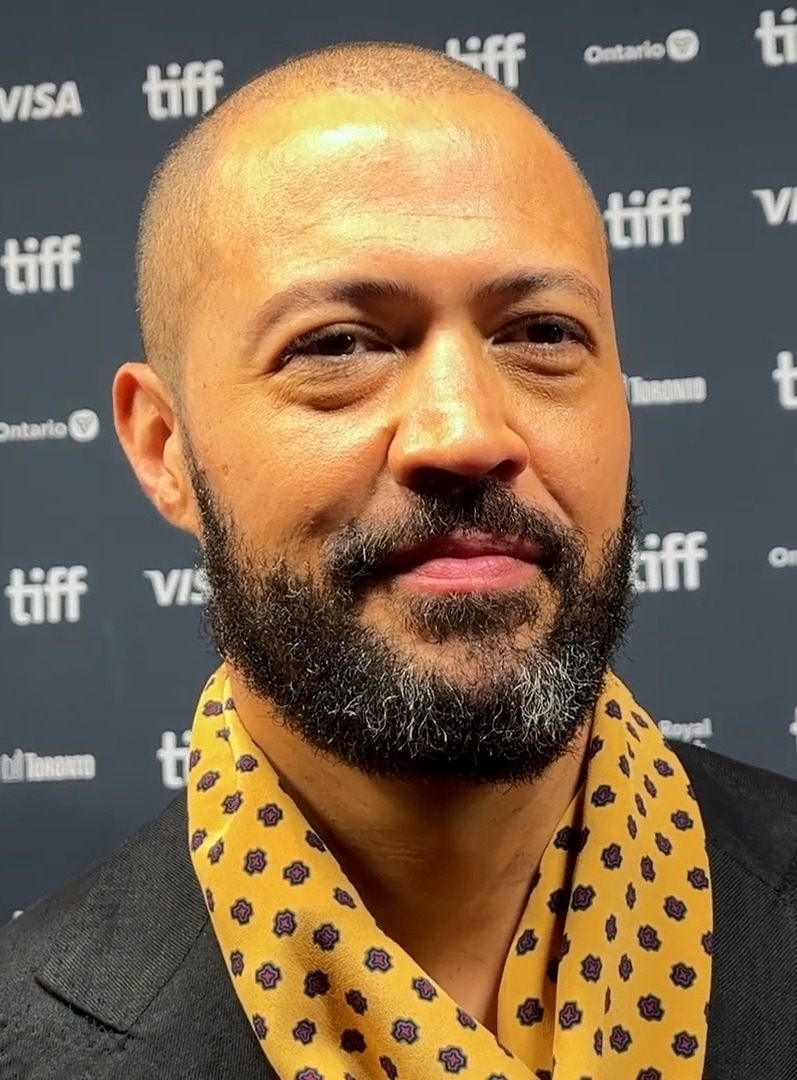
Cord Jefferson, Best Adapted Screenplay winner

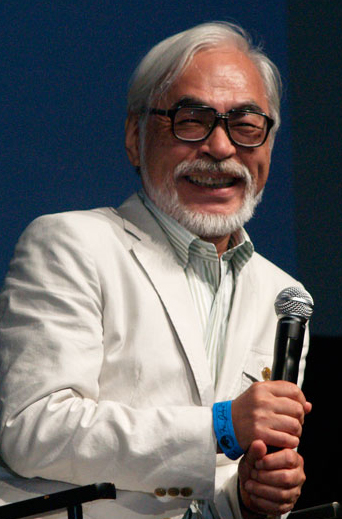
Hayao Miyazaki, Best Animated Feature Film co-winner

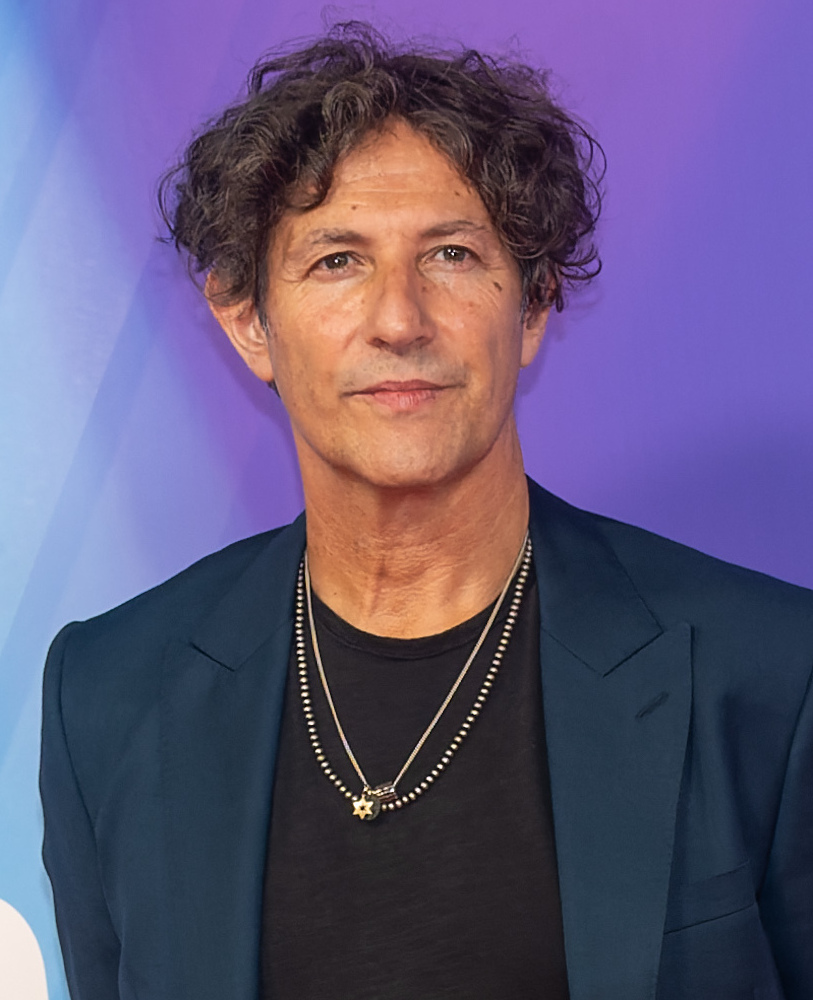
Jonathan Glazer, Best International Feature Film winner

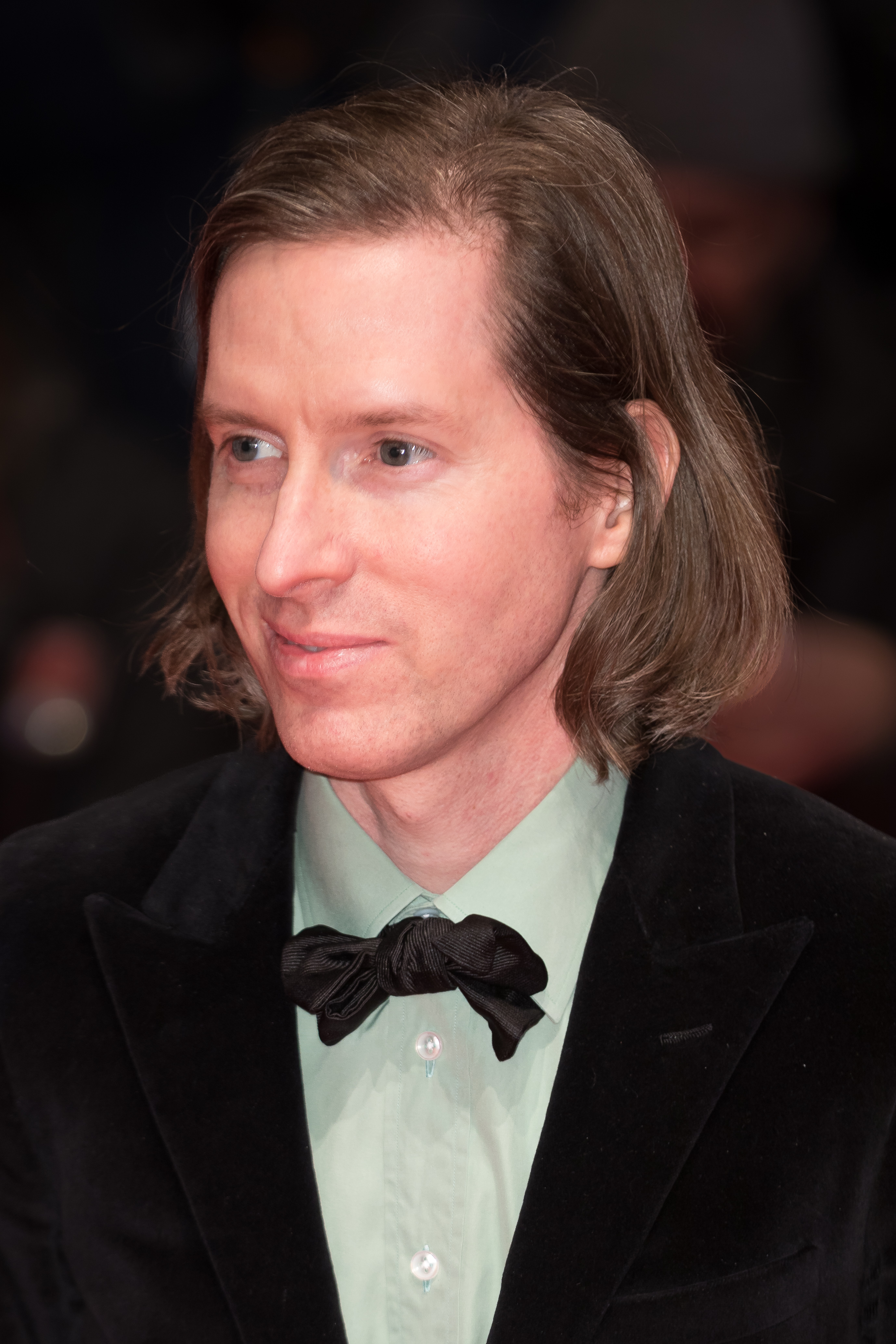
Wes Anderson, Best Live Action Short co-winner

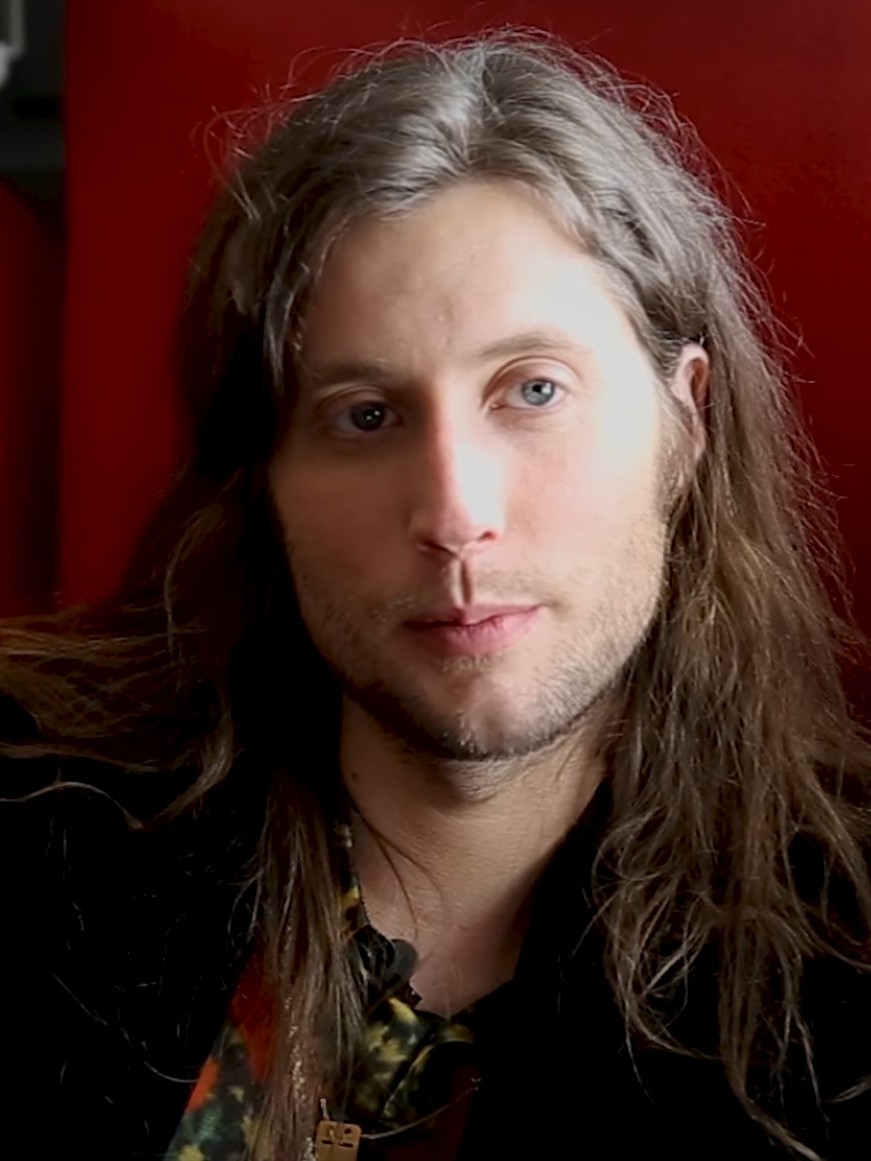
Ludwig Göransson, Best Original Score winner

The nominees for the 96th Academy Awards were announced on January 23, 2024, at the Samuel Goldwyn Theater in Beverly Hills, by actress Zazie Beetz and actor Jack Quaid. Oppenheimer led all nominees with thirteen nominations; Poor Things came in second with eleven. The winners were announced during the awards ceremony on March 10.

Oppenheimer is the first Best Picture winner to also win both male acting awards since Ben-Hur (1959). For the first time in Oscar history, three Best Picture nominees were directed by women. At age 81, Martin Scorsese became the oldest Best Director nominee in Oscar history. Best Actress nominee Lily Gladstone became the first US-born Native American person nominated in that category. The 49-year gap between Robert De Niro's first nomination for The Godfather Part II and his latest for Killers of the Flower Moon set the record for longest gap between first and most recent career Oscar nominations. Having previously won for composing the titular song for No Time to Die (2021), Best Original Song co-winner Billie Eilish became the youngest person to win two Oscars. Best Sound winner The Zone of Interest and Best Visual Effects winner Godzilla Minus One were the first non-English language films to win their respective categories.

=== Awards ===
Winners are listed first, highlighted in boldface, and indicated with a double dagger (‡).

**Best Picture**: **Oppenheimer – Emma Thomas, Charles Roven, and Christopher Nolan, producers ‡**; American Fiction – Ben LeClair, Nikos Karamigios, Cord Jefferson, and Jermaine Johnson, producers; Anatomy of a Fall – Marie-Ange Luciani and David Thion, producers; Barbie – David Heyman, Margot Robbie, Tom Ackerley, and Robbie Brenner, producers; The Holdovers – Mark Johnson, producer; Killers of the Flower Moon – Dan Friedkin, Bradley Thomas, Martin Scorsese, and Daniel Lupi, producers; Maestro – Bradley Cooper, Steven Spielberg, Fred Berner, Amy Durning, and Kristie Macosko Krieger, producers; Past Lives – David Hinojosa, Christine Vachon, and Pamela Koffler, producers; Poor Things – Ed Guiney, Andrew Lowe, Yorgos Lanthimos, and Emma Stone, producers; The Zone of Interest – James Wilson, producer	**Best Directing**: **Christopher Nolan – Oppenheimer ‡**; Justine Triet – Anatomy of a Fall; Martin Scorsese – Killers of the Flower Moon; Yorgos Lanthimos – Poor Things; Jonathan Glazer – The Zone of Interest
**Best Actor in a Leading Role**: **Cillian Murphy – Oppenheimer as J. Robert Oppenheimer ‡**; Bradley Cooper – Maestro as Leonard Bernstein; Colman Domingo – Rustin as Bayard Rustin; Paul Giamatti – The Holdovers as Paul Hunham; Jeffrey Wright – American Fiction as Thelonious "Monk" Ellison	**Best Actress in a Leading Role**: **Emma Stone – Poor Things as Bella Baxter ‡**; Annette Bening – Nyad as Diana Nyad; Lily Gladstone – Killers of the Flower Moon as Mollie Burkhart; Sandra Hüller – Anatomy of a Fall as Sandra Voyter; Carey Mulligan – Maestro as Felicia Montealegre
**Best Actor in a Supporting Role**: **Robert Downey Jr. – Oppenheimer as Lewis Strauss ‡**; Sterling K. Brown – American Fiction as Clifford "Cliff" Ellison; Robert De Niro – Killers of the Flower Moon as William King Hale; Ryan Gosling – Barbie as Ken; Mark Ruffalo – Poor Things as Duncan Wedderburn	**Best Actress in a Supporting Role**: **Da'Vine Joy Randolph – The Holdovers as Mary Lamb ‡**; Emily Blunt – Oppenheimer as Kitty Oppenheimer; Danielle Brooks – The Color Purple as Sofia; America Ferrera – Barbie as Gloria; Jodie Foster – Nyad as Bonnie Stoll
**Best Writing (Original Screenplay)**: **Anatomy of a Fall – Justine Triet and Arthur Harari ‡**; The Holdovers – David Hemingson; Maestro – Bradley Cooper and Josh Singer; May December – Screenplay by Samy Burch; Story by Samy Burch and Alex Mechanik; Past Lives – Celine Song	**Best Writing (Adapted Screenplay)**: **American Fiction – Cord Jefferson; based on the novel Erasure by Percival Everett ‡**; Barbie – Greta Gerwig and Noah Baumbach; based on Barbie by Mattel; Oppenheimer – Christopher Nolan; based on the biography American Prometheus: The Triumph and Tragedy of J. Robert Oppenheimer by Kai Bird and Martin J. Sherwin; Poor Things – Tony McNamara; based on the novel by Alasdair Gray; The Zone of Interest – Jonathan Glazer; based on the novel by Martin Amis
**Best Animated Feature Film**: **The Boy and the Heron – Hayao Miyazaki and Toshio Suzuki ‡**; Elemental – Peter Sohn and Denise Ream; Nimona – Nick Bruno, Troy Quane, Karen Ryan, and Julie Zackary; Robot Dreams – Pablo Berger, Ibón Cormenzana, Ignasi Estapé, and Sandra Tapia Díaz; Spider-Man: Across the Spider-Verse – Kemp Powers, Justin K. Thompson, Phil Lord, Christopher Miller, and Amy Pascal	**Best International Feature Film**: **The Zone of Interest (United Kingdom) in German, Polish, and Yiddish – directed by Jonathan Glazer ‡**; Io capitano (Italy) in Wolof and French – directed by Matteo Garrone; Perfect Days (Japan) in Japanese – directed by Wim Wenders; Society of the Snow (Spain) in Spanish – directed by J. A. Bayona; The Teachers' Lounge (Germany) in German, Turkish, Polish, and English – directed by İlker Çatak
**Best Documentary Feature Film**: **20 Days in Mariupol – Mstyslav Chernov, Michelle Mizner, and Raney Aronson-Rath ‡**; Bobi Wine: The People's President – Moses Bwayo, Christopher Sharp, and John Battsek; The Eternal Memory – Maite Alberdi; Four Daughters – Kaouther Ben Hania and Nadim Cheikhrouha; To Kill a Tiger – Nisha Pahuja, Cornelia Principe, and David Oppenheim	**Best Documentary Short Film**: **The Last Repair Shop – Ben Proudfoot and Kris Bowers ‡**; The ABCs of Book Banning – Sheila Nevins and Trish Adlesic; The Barber of Little Rock – John Hoffman and Christine Turner; Island in Between – S. Leo Chiang and Jean Tsien; Nǎi Nai & Wài Pó – Sean Wang and Sam Davis
**Best Short Film (Live Action)**: **The Wonderful Story of Henry Sugar – Wes Anderson and Steven Rales ‡**; The After – Misan Harriman and Nicky Bentham; Invincible – Vincent René-Lortie and Samuel Caron; Knight of Fortune – Lasse Lyskjær Noer and Christian Norlyk; Red, White and Blue – Nazrin Choudhury and Sara McFarlane	**Best Short Film (Animated)**: **War Is Over! Inspired by the Music of John and Yoko – Dave Mullins and Brad Booker ‡**; Letter to a Pig – Tal Kantor and Amit R. Gicelter; Ninety-Five Senses – Jared and Jerusha Hess; Our Uniform – Yegane Moghaddam; Pachyderme – Stéphanie Clément and Marc Rius
**Best Music (Original Score)**: **Oppenheimer – Ludwig Göransson ‡**; American Fiction – Laura Karpman; Indiana Jones and the Dial of Destiny – John Williams; Killers of the Flower Moon – Robbie Robertson (p.n.); Poor Things – Jerskin Fendrix	**Best Music (Original Song)**: **"What Was I Made For?" from Barbie – Music and lyrics by Billie Eilish and Finneas O'Connell ‡**; "The Fire Inside" from Flamin' Hot – Music and lyrics by Diane Warren; "I'm Just Ken" from Barbie – Music and lyrics by Mark Ronson and Andrew Wyatt; "It Never Went Away" from American Symphony – Music and lyrics by Jon Batiste and Dan Wilson; "Wahzhazhe (A Song for My People)" from Killers of the Flower Moon – Music and lyrics by Scott George
**Best Sound**: **The Zone of Interest – Tarn Willers and Johnnie Burn ‡**; The Creator – Ian Voigt, Erik Aadahl, Ethan Van der Ryn, Tom Ozanich, and Dean Zupancic; Maestro – Steven A. Morrow, Richard King, Jason Ruder, Tom Ozanich, and Dean Zupancic; Mission: Impossible – Dead Reckoning Part One – Chris Munro, James H. Mather, Chris Burdon, and Mark Taylor; Oppenheimer – Willie Burton, Richard King, Gary A. Rizzo, and Kevin O'Connell	**Best Production Design**: **Poor Things – Production Design: James Price and Shona Heath; Set Decoration: Zsuzsa Mihalek ‡**; Barbie – Production Design: Sarah Greenwood; Set Decoration: Katie Spencer; Killers of the Flower Moon – Production Design: Jack Fisk; Set Decoration: Adam Willis; Napoleon – Production Design: Arthur Max; Set Decoration: Elli Griff; Oppenheimer – Production Design: Ruth De Jong; Set Decoration: Claire Kaufman
**Best Cinematography**: **Oppenheimer – Hoyte van Hoytema ‡**; El Conde – Edward Lachman; Killers of the Flower Moon – Rodrigo Prieto; Maestro – Matthew Libatique; Poor Things – Robbie Ryan	**Best Makeup and Hairstyling**: **Poor Things – Nadia Stacey, Mark Coulier, and Josh Weston ‡**; Golda – Karen Hartley Thomas, Suzi Battersby, and Ashra Kelly-Blue; Maestro – Kazu Hiro, Kay Georgiou, and Lori McCoy-Bell; Oppenheimer – Luisa Abel; Society of the Snow – Ana López-Puigcerver, David Martí, and Montse Ribé
**Best Costume Design**: **Poor Things – Holly Waddington ‡**; Barbie – Jacqueline Durran; Killers of the Flower Moon – Jacqueline West; Napoleon – Janty Yates and Dave Crossman; Oppenheimer – Ellen Mirojnick	**Best Film Editing**: **Oppenheimer – Jennifer Lame ‡**; Anatomy of a Fall – Laurent Sénéchal; The Holdovers – Kevin Tent; Killers of the Flower Moon – Thelma Schoonmaker; Poor Things – Yorgos Mavropsaridis
**Best Visual Effects**: **Godzilla Minus One – Takashi Yamazaki, Kiyoko Shibuya, Masaki Takahashi, and Tatsuji Nojima ‡**; The Creator – Jay Cooper, Ian Comley, Andrew Roberts, and Neil Corbould; Guardians of the Galaxy Vol. 3 – Stéphane Ceretti, Alexis Wajsbrot, Guy Williams, and Theo Bialek; Mission: Impossible – Dead Reckoning Part One – Alex Wuttke, Simone Coco, Jeff Sutherland, and Neil Corbould; Napoleon – Charley Henley, Luc-Ewen Martin-Fenouillet, Simone Coco, and Neil Corbould

=== Governors Awards ===
The academy held its 14th annual Governors Awards ceremony on January 9, 2024, during which the following awards were presented:

==== Honorary Awards ====
- To Angela Bassett, who has inspired audiences around the world with her powerful and fearless performances.
- To Mel Brooks, for his comedic brilliance, producing acumen and expansive body of work.
- To Carol Littleton, whose commitment to her craft has significantly elevated the art of film editing.

==== Jean Hersholt Humanitarian Award ====
- Michelle Satter – "For her unwavering support of filmmakers and commitment to the independent filmmaking community."

=== Films with multiple nominations and awards ===
Films with multiple nominations
Nominations	Film
13	Oppenheimer
11	Poor Things
10	Killers of the Flower Moon
8	Barbie
7	Maestro
5	American Fiction
5	Anatomy of a Fall
5	The Holdovers
5	The Zone of Interest
3	Napoleon
2	The Creator
2	Mission: Impossible – Dead Reckoning Part One
2	Nyad
2	Past Lives
2	Society of the Snow

Films with multiple wins
Awards	Film
7	Oppenheimer
4	Poor Things
2	The Zone of Interest

== Presenters and performers ==
The following individuals, listed in order of appearance, presented awards or performed musical numbers:

Presenters
Name(s)	Role
David Alan Grier	Served as announcer for the 96th Academy Awards
Jamie Lee Curtis; Regina King; Rita Moreno; Lupita Nyong'o; Mary Steenburgen	Presented the award for Best Supporting Actress
Chris Hemsworth; Anya Taylor-Joy	Presented the awards for Best Animated Short Film and Best Animated Feature Film
Melissa McCarthy; Octavia Spencer	Presented the awards for Best Original Screenplay and Best Adapted Screenplay
Michael Keaton; Catherine O'Hara	Presented the awards for Best Makeup and Hairstyling and Best Production Design
John Cena	Presented the award for Best Costume Design
Bad Bunny; Dwayne Johnson	Presented the award for Best International Feature Film
Emily Blunt; Ryan Gosling	Presented tribute to all the stunt performers in cinema history
Mahershala Ali; Ke Huy Quan; Tim Robbins; Sam Rockwell; Christoph Waltz	Presented the award for Best Supporting Actor
Danny DeVito; Arnold Schwarzenegger	Presented the awards for Best Visual Effects and Best Film Editing
America Ferrera; Kate McKinnon	Presented the awards for Best Documentary Short Film and Best Documentary Feature Film
Zendaya	Presented the award for Best Cinematography
Issa Rae; Ramy Youssef	Presented the award for Best Live Action Short Film
John Mulaney	Presented the award for Best Sound
Cynthia Erivo; Ariana Grande	Presented the awards for Best Original Score and Best Original Song
Nicolas Cage; Brendan Fraser; Ben Kingsley; Matthew McConaughey; Forest Whitaker	Presented the award for Best Actor
Steven Spielberg	Presented the award for Best Director
Sally Field; Jessica Lange; Jennifer Lawrence; Charlize Theron; Michelle Yeoh	Presented the award for Best Actress
Al Pacino	Presented the award for Best Picture

Performers
Name(s)	Role	Work
Rickey Minor	Musical director Conductor	Orchestral
Billie Eilish; Finneas O'Connell	Performers	"What Was I Made For?" from Barbie
Scott George; Osage singers and dancers	Performers	"Wahzhazhe (A Song for My People)" from Killers of the Flower Moon
Jon Batiste	Performer	"It Never Went Away" from American Symphony
Becky G	Performer	"The Fire Inside" from Flamin' Hot
Ryan Gosling; Mark Ronson; Simu Liu; Scott Evans; Ncuti Gatwa; Kingsley Ben-Adir; Slash; Wolfgang Van Halen	Performers	"I'm Just Ken" from Barbie
Andrea Bocelli; Matteo Bocelli	Performers	"Time to Say Goodbye" during the annual "In Memoriam" tribute

== Ceremony information ==
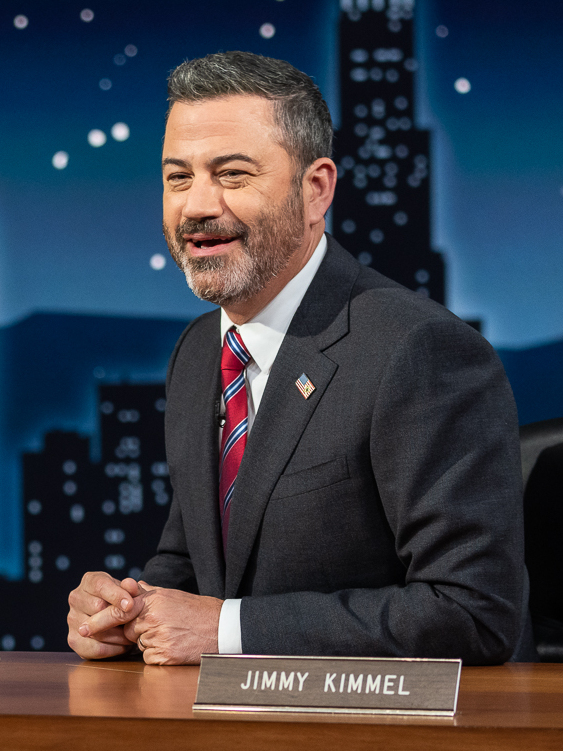
Jimmy Kimmel hosted the 96th Academy Awards.

In October 2023, the academy hired television producers Raj Kapoor and Katy Mullan to oversee production of the 2024 ceremony with veteran television director Hamish Hamilton selected to direct the telecast. "Raj and Hamish have been incredible Oscars collaborators, and we are delighted to welcome them and Katy to lead the 96th Oscars," said AMPAS CEO Bill Kramer and AMPAS president Janet Yang in a press release justifying their selection of the producers. "Their deep love of cinema, fresh vision, and tremendous live television expertise is perfect for our reinvigorated show." In response, Kapoor and Mullan released a statement saying, "As a Canadian boy of South Asian descent and a girl from London who grew up watching the Oscars, dreaming of being part of it, this is a 'pinch me' moment! This has been an exceptional year for the movies, and it's an absolute privilege to be leading the team celebrating the global film industry and the astounding talents that bring these cinematic stories to life. We're dedicated to making it a remarkable celebration for all."

The following month, comedian and talk show host Jimmy Kimmel was announced as host of the gala, and his wife Molly McNearney was hired to join Kapoor and Mullan as a co-producer. Kapoor and Mullan explained their reason to bring back the veteran comedian and talk show host saying, "Jimmy has cemented himself as one of the all-time great Oscars hosts with his perfect blend of humanity and humor, and Molly is one of the best live TV producers around. We are delighted to be working with them and their teams on the show." Kimmel responded to his selection as host in a press release retorting, "I always dreamed of hosting the Oscars exactly four times."

In an effort to increase ratings and viewership, the Academy and ABC announced that the ceremony's start time would be moved ahead by an hour to 4:00 p.m. PT (7:00 p.m. ET). Producers hoped that the earlier start time would result in winners in major categories being announced earlier in the evening and would therefore mitigate declining viewership on the East Coast. As a result of the changes, the red carpet pre-show that precedes the main telecast was shortened to 30 minutes from its usual 90 minute runtime. ABC would also have the ability to air a primetime program as a lead-out for the ceremony at 7:30 p.m. PT (10:30 p.m. ET), with the network scheduling a new episode of its sitcom Abbott Elementary.

Several others participated in the production of the ceremony and related events. Production designers Misty Buckley and Alana Billingsley designed a new stage for the show. According to Buckley and Billingsley, the stage was designed to "create a modern plaza that invites people in." Furthermore, the set utilized several columns that subtly changed images during several awards presentations such as typewriters for screenwriters for the screenplay categories and sketches of the Best Costume Design nominees for the aforementioned category. Musician Rickey Minor was the musical director for the ceremony. Comedian and journalist Amelia Dimoldenberg served as a social media and red carpet correspondent, interviewing nominees at events including the Oscars nominees lunch and hosting videos showcasing behind the scenes preparations leading up the ceremony. In addition, Dimoldenberg and internet personality Reece Feldman interviewed nominees and guests of the ceremony on platforms such as Facebook and TikTok. Choreographer Mandy Moore oversaw production of Ryan Gosling and Mark Ronson's performance of "I'm Just Ken" which paid homage to the song "Diamonds Are a Girl's Best Friend" from the film Gentlemen Prefer Blondes (1953). The performance utilized 62 different actors portraying Ken, and featured cameos from Gosling's Barbie co-stars Kingsley Ben-Adir, Scott Evans, Ncuti Gatwa, and Simu Liu, and musicians Wolfgang Van Halen and Slash.

Initially, the Governors Awards were scheduled to be held on November 18, 2023, but they were postponed by two months to January 9, 2024, due to the 2023 Hollywood labor disputes. Meanwhile, actress Michelle Pfeiffer was planned to co-present Best Picture with her Scarface co-star Al Pacino. However, prior commitments on the East Coast prevented her from traveling in time for the ceremony, and Pacino presented the award solo.

=== Best Picture nominee diversity rules ===
In September 2020, the Academy announced that, starting with the 96th awards, all films submitted for Best Picture consideration must satisfy an established set of "representation and inclusion standards". In a press release, then-AMPAS president David Rubin and then-Academy CEO Dawn Hudson said of the new standards, "The aperture must widen to reflect our diverse global population in both the creation of motion pictures and in the audiences who connect with them. The Academy is committed to playing a vital role in helping make this a reality. We believe these inclusion standards will be a catalyst for long-lasting, essential change in our industry."

According to the rules, each film would be required to satisfy at least two of the four standards by hiring people from an "underrepresented" group namely individuals from a racial/ethnic minority, LGBTQ+ people, or persons with a cognitive or physical disability in order to compete in the category. Standard A involves "On-screen representation, themes, and narratives" which deals with a film's lead performers, cast, or subject matter. Standard B entails "Creative leadership and department heads" which involves creative heads in a film's production or the film's crew as a whole. Standard C encompasses "Industry access and opportunities" which refers to both paid internships and training opportunities. Standard D involves "Audience development" which refers to representation in marketing, publicity, and distribution. Filmmakers would have to submit a confidential Representation and Inclusion Standards Entry form (RAISE) indicating how their films would comply with the standards outlined by the academy.

Three years after the new rules were announced, AMPAS released a statement affirming that films not submitted for Best Picture consideration could bypass submitting the RAISE forms reporting a film's gender, race, and disability data. In addition, Academy FAQs stated that British films that have complied with the British Film Institute's inclusion and diversity standards would also be deemed as satisfying the Academy's diversity requirements.

=== Box office performance of Best Picture nominees ===
When the nominations were announced, nine of the ten films nominated for Best Picture had earned a combined gross of $1.09 billion at the American and Canadian box offices at the time. Barbie was the highest-grossing film among the Best Picture nominees with $636 million in domestic box office receipts. Oppenheimer came in second with $326 million; this was followed by Killers of the Flower Moon ($67 million), Poor Things ($20.4 million), The Holdovers ($18.7 million), Past Lives ($10.9 million), American Fiction ($7.9 million), Anatomy of a Fall ($3.9 million), and The Zone of Interest ($1.6 million). The official domestic box office figures for Maestro were unavailable due to their distributor Netflix's policy of refusing to release such figures. Furthermore, with its win for Best Picture, Oppenheimer became the highest-grossing winner in that category since 2003's The Lord of the Rings: The Return of the King.

=== Critical reviews and reactions ===
Television critic Robert Lloyd of the Los Angeles Times wrote, "It was a long night, as it always is, but not the slog it often is. The scripted banter was better than usual, and when it failed, personality took up the slack." Regarding Kimmel's performance as host, he commented that he was "a reliable, relatable presence liable to stir no controversy in a venue that has a low tolerance for controversy. At the same time he's sharp enough not to be boring." Alison Herman of Variety remarked that despite the lack of surprises amongst the winners, "The show delivered entertainment and emotion in spades, if not surprise." She also commended Gosling's performance of "I'm Just Ken" as "a maximalist, infectiously goofy singalong was the ideal way to channel the feel-good energy of an Oscars where none of the bonhomie felt forced, as it often can." The Hollywood Reporter columnist Daniel Fienberg lauded Kimmel as "A guy you can trust to do a monologue and then he'll hold together the disparate components and fill dead air and generally keep the mood light." He also singled out the decision to have five previous winners presenting the nominees in each acting category as a highlight of the festivities and acclaimed the witty banter between co-presenters.

Furthermore, The Zone of Interest director, Jonathan Glazer, received both praise and criticism for his acceptance speech calling for an end to Israel's bombardment of Gaza. One sentence from Glazer's speech, in which he said that he and fellow producer James Wilson "stand here as men who refute their Jewishness and the Holocaust being hijacked by an occupation which has led to conflict for so many innocent people", was widely misquoted. Some sources truncated his remarks after the words "refute their Jewishness", suggesting that Glazer was disavowing his Jewish identity. Many pro-Israel figures disapproved of the statement, and over 1,000 Jewish members of the film industry signed an open letter denouncing Glazer's speech and defending the actions of the Israeli government. Others, including playwright Tony Kushner and director of the Auschwitz-Birkenau State Museum, Piotr Cywiński, defended Glazer's comments. One month after the ceremony took place, over 450 Jewish members of the international film community, including Joel Coen, Elliott Gould, Todd Haynes, Joaquin Phoenix, and Wallace Shawn, signed an open letter in support of Glazer's speech.

=== Ratings and reception ===
The American telecast on ABC drew in an average of 19.49 million people over its length, which was a 4% increase from the previous year's ceremony. The show also held steady in Nielsen ratings compared to the previous ceremony with 9.9% of households watching the ceremony. However, it garnered a lower 18–49 demo rating with a 3.8 rating among viewers in that demographic. Its Live+7 rating was 20.215 million people, which made it the 13th highest rated primetime telecast in the United States in 2024, behind only sport events and the second presidential debate.

In July 2024, the broadcast was nominated for seven awards at the 76th Primetime Emmys and its corresponding Creative Arts Emmy Awards. Two months later, the broadcast won four of those nominations for Outstanding Variety Special (Live) (Executive Producers: Raj Kapoor, Katy Mullan, and Molly McNearney; Co-Executive Producer: Rob Paine; Producers: Taryn Hurd and Sarah Levine Hall; Host: Jimmy Kimmel), Outstanding Directing for a Variety Special (Hamish Hamilton), Outstanding Music Direction (Rickey Minor), and Outstanding Production Design for a Variety Special (Production Designers: Alana Billinglsey and Misty Buckley; Art Directors: John Zuiker and Margaux LaPresle). It marked the first time since the 63rd ceremony in 1991, that an Academy Awards ceremony was awarded a top Primetime Emmy Award for variety programming.

== "In Memoriam" ==
The "In Memoriam" tribute, which featured singer Andrea Bocelli performing his song "Time to Say Goodbye" with his son Matteo, paid tribute to the following individuals:

- Michael Gambon – actor
- Norman Jewison – director, producer
- Harry Belafonte – actor, singer, producer, activist
- Diana Giorgiutti – visual effects producer
- Alan Arkin – actor, director
- Nitin Chandrakant Desai – production designer
- Bo Goldman – writer
- Norman Reynolds – production designer, art director
- Julian Sands – actor
- Mark Gustafson – director
- Andre Braugher – actor
- Chita Rivera – actress, dancer
- Tom Wilkinson – actor
- Glynis Johns – actress
- Jane Birkin – actress, singer
- Paul Reubens – actor, comedian, writer
- Piper Laurie – actress
- Richard Roundtree – actor
- Ryan O'Neal – actor
- Cynthia Weil – songwriter
- Bill Lee – composer
- Ryuichi Sakamoto – composer, musician, actor
- Robbie Robertson – composer, musician, songwriter, actor
- Dewitt L. Sage – producer, director, documentarian
- Margaret Riley – manager, producer
- Hengameh Panahi – sales agent, producer
- Michael Latt – marketing consultant, activist
- Nancy Buirski – director, writer, producer
- Sue Marx – producer
- Peter Berkos – sound editor
- Osvaldo Desideri – set decorator
- Joanna Merlin – actress, casting director
- Erik Lomis – distribution executive
- Glenn Farr – film editor
- Leon Ichaso – director, writer
- Robert M. Young – director, producer
- Greg Morrison – marketing executive
- Jake Bloom – entertainment attorney
- Matthew Perry – actor
- John Bailey – cinematographer, Academy president 2017–2019
- Richard Lewis – actor, comedian
- Edward Mark – costume supervisor
- John Refoua – film editor
- Lawrence Turman – producer
- Lee Sun-kyun – actor
- Arthur Schmidt – film editor
- Bill Butler – cinematographer
- Carl Weathers – actor
- William Friedkin – director, writer, producer
- Glenda Jackson – actress, politician
- Tina Turner – singer, actress

Before the "In Memoriam" segment, the academy paid tribute to Russian activist and dissident Alexei Navalny, who died nearly a month before the ceremony, by airing a clip from the Oscar-winning documentary Navalny (2022). Furthermore, a collage of additional names paying tribute to individuals such as Ron Cephas Jones, Norman Lear, Cormac McCarthy, Sinéad O'Connor, Lance Reddick, Suzanne Somers, Ray Stevenson, and Treat Williams appeared onscreen at the conclusion of the segment.

== See also ==
- List of submissions to the 96th Academy Awards for Best Animated Feature
- List of submissions to the 96th Academy Awards for Best Documentary Feature
- List of submissions to the 96th Academy Awards for Best International Feature Film
