= Lou (2017 film) =

2017 American short film

LOU
- Film poster
- Directed by: Dave Mullins
- Written by: Dave Mullins
- Produced by: Dana Murray
- Cinematography: Adam Habib; Brian Boyd
- Edited by: Anthony J. Greenberg
- Music by: Christophe Beck
- Production company: Pixar Animation Studios
- Distributed by: Walt Disney Studios; Motion Pictures (Note: Distributed by Walt Disney Studios Motion Pictures through the Walt Disney Pictures banner.)
- Release dates: March 12, 2017 (SXSW); June 16, 2017 (with Cars 3)
- Running time: 7 minutes
- Country: United States

LOU is a 2017 American animated short film written and directed by Dave Mullins and produced by Pixar. It was theatrically released alongside Pixar's Cars 3 on June 16, 2017. The film is about a lost-and-found box and the unseen monster within. It was nominated for the Academy Award for Best Animated Short Film at the 90th Academy Awards.

== Plot ==
The lost-and-found box in a kindergarten playground is home to Lou, a creature made from the assorted unclaimed items (whose name is made up of three letters missing from the sign on the box). After each recess period, Lou picks up the toys and items kids have left behind, leaving them in the box and subtly encouraging their owners to find them when they return.

A school bully named JJ starts stealing toys from the other children and putting them in his backpack. Lou is angered by this and decides to take J.J.'s backpack once J.J is the last kid on the playground. J.J catches him in the act and a chase ensues, with Lou constantly changing his shape to avoid being caught.

During the chase, Lou notices the name tag on J.J.'s underwear matches the name tag on a toy in the bottom of the box, an old plushie dog that a bigger kid had stolen from J.J. some years before. Lou shows the dog to J.J, but refuses to give it to him until J.J. returns the toys he stole. J.J. initially returns the toys begrudgingly, but is surprised when a girl gratefully hugs him. He begins to enjoy returning the remaining items, making some new friends in the process, which in turn motivates him to find the owners of every single item in the box. Returning to the box for the last time, J.J. finds that Lou is no longer present, as all of his parts have been claimed by their owners. J.J. sees his plushie dog is the last toy left and happily reclaims it. A football lands near him and he decides to join two other boys for a game of catch.

== Reception ==
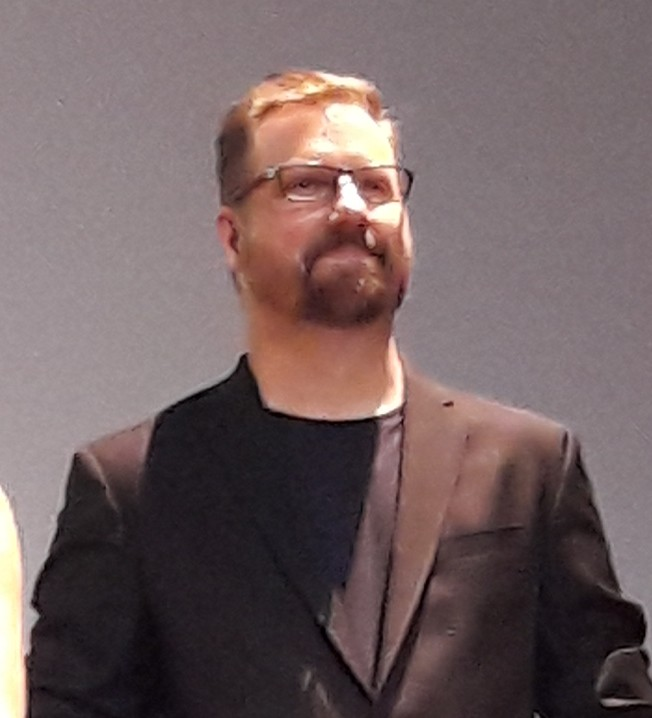
Director Dave Mullins presented the film at the 2017 Annecy International Animated Film Festival.

Lou premiered at the South by Southwest festival on March 12, 2017. It was theatrically released on June 16, 2017, together with Pixar's eighteenth film Cars 3.

The film is dedicated to Mullins' father, who died during the making of the short.

== Awards ==
| Year | Presenter/Festival | Award/Category | Status |
|---|---|---|---|
| 2018 | Academy Awards | Best Animated Short Film | Nominated |
