= War Is Over! =

2022 animated short film by Dave Mullins

War Is Over! Inspired by the Music of John and Yoko
- Directed by: Dave Mullins
- Written by: Dave Mullins
- Story by: Dave Mullins; Sean Ono Lennon
- Produced by: Brad Booker
- Music by: Thomas Newman
- Production companies: ElectroLeague; Lenono Music; Wētā FX; Lightstorm Entertainment; Unreal Engine
- Release date: 2023
- Running time: 11 minutes
- Country: United States

War Is Over! Inspired by the Music of John and Yoko is a 2023 independent animated short film written and directed by Dave Mullins. The 11-minute short was inspired by and features John Lennon and Yoko Ono's anti-war anthem "Happy Xmas (War Is Over)". The film was also based on a story by Mullins and Sean Ono Lennon. The film was produced by Brad Booker and production was handled by Booker and Mullins' Los Angeles-based animation studio ElectroLeague, in partnership with Lenono Music, Sean Ono Lennon and Yoko Ono and Lightstorm Entertainment with Jon Landau being an credited as an executive producer. Thomas Newman composed the score for the film.

War Is Over! won the Academy Award for Best Animated Short Film at the 96th Academy Awards. The film was later released on YouTube on December 1, 2025, by John Lennon's official channel.

== Plot ==
During World War I, two armies stand at a trench warfare stalemate over No man's land. A young soldier on the left side of the battlefield is playing a game of chess with an opponent he does not know, with him delivering his moves as the player playing black to the opponent via slips of paper that he and his opponent send each other via a messenger pigeon they keep as a pet. As it turns out, his opponent playing white is a soldier found the right side of the battlefield, who is also oblivious to the other's identity.

Over time, their game starts to draw the attention of other soldiers on their respective sides. This eventually draws the ire of the left soldier's commanding officer, who trashes the game while the left soldier is making a move. The officer then has the men mobilize for a full frontal assault across the battlefield, and sends the pigeon back to the general's headquarters to deliver their intentions. The left army advances, with the right army seeing this and launching a counterattack.

The left and right soldiers see each other on the battlefield, and end up engaging in a melee. This ends when the right soldier ripping the uniform of the left soldier, unfurling all of the papers that he has received. Recognizing him, the right soldier reveals his own identity. Just as they end hostilities, they see the pigeon returning with a new message from the general, only for it to be struck and killed by a mortar shell.

Recovering the pigeon, the two soldiers find and read its final message: “War is Over!”. They alert their respective commanding officers of the news, and the battle eventually ceases. As all the soldiers recover their bearings, the two soldiers bury the pigeon. The film then cuts to the right soldier's chess board, which now just has a white and black pawn on it, as other pigeons fly above.

== Production ==
War Is Over! Inspired by the Music of John and Yoko is an animated short film produced by ElectroLeague studio. The animation and visual effects were created by Peter Jackson's New Zealand-based VFX company Wētā FX. Epic Games’ Unreal Engine was used in production to create the imagery. The film was edited by John K. Carr and scored by Oscar-nominated composer Thomas Newman.

== Accolades ==
The film won the Annie Award for Best Animated Short Subject at the 51st Annie Awards on February 17, 2024, and later won the Academy Award for Best Animated Short Film at the 96th Academy Awards on March 10, 2024.

== Reception ==
Collin Souter of Roger Ebert.com praised the film (seen as part of ShortsTV program of Oscar-nominated short films), confessing that:

"Maybe I liked this more than others because it was the last one I watched and, for once, it wasn’t someone narrating a story about their past. And maybe because I’m a sap for the song. I get why people roll their eyes at the end, and I think I did at first, but I eventually found myself going along with its heartfelt sincerity, just like any Lennon/Ono song that wears its heart on its sleeve. The artists at WETA digital collaborated with Sean Lennon Ono on the piece and it tells a good story no matter how hamfisted the ending may be. I went into this thinking we’d be getting a music video treatment of the song, coupled with obvious present-day footage to make a point. This was a refreshing change of pace, both for the program and the approach".

Bea Hammam of 34th Street Magazine stated that the film was stylistically the least creative out of all the Animated Short nominees.
