= Arthouse animation =

Combination of art film and animated film

Arthouse animation is a combination of art film and animated film.

== Examples of arthouse animated films ==
=== 20th century ===
- The Cameraman's Revenge (1912)
- El Apóstol (1917; now considered a lost film)
- Opus II-IV (1921-1925)
- The Adventures of Prince Achmed (1926)
- A Night on Bald Mountain (1933)
- The Peanut Vendor (1933)
- The Tale of Tsar Durandai (1934)
- A Colour Box (1935)
- The Birth of the Robot (1936)
- The Tale of the Fox (1937)
- An Optical Poem (1938)
- Fantasia (1940)
- Tarantula (1940)
- Boogie-Doodle (1941)
- Le petit Soldat (1947)
- Begone Dull Care (1949)
- Inspiration (1949)
- Rooty Toot Toot (1952)
- Neighbours (1952)
- The Tell-Tale Heart (1953)
- Journey to the Beginning of Time (1955)
- The Adventures of * (1957)
- A Chairy Tale (1957)
- Flebus (1957)
- The Snow Queen (1957)
- Invention for Destruction (1958)
- The Little Island (1958)
- Samac (1958)
- Blazes (1961)
- Big Troubles (1961)
- The Fabulous Baron Munchausen (1962)
- The Story of a Crime (1962)
- Automania 2000 (1963)
- The Critic (1963)
- Mothlight (1963)
- Game of Angels (1964)
- The Hand (1965)
- The Snails (1966)
- The Fly (1968)
- Yellow Submarine (1968)
- The Glass Harmonica (1968)
- The Alphabet (1969)
- Bambi Meets Godzilla (1969)
- Walking (1969)
- The Grandmother (1970)
- Roadfilm (1970)
- Benny's Bathtub (1971)
- Balablok (1972)
- Fritz the Cat (1972)
- Tup Tup (1972)
- Accident (1973)
- Belladonna of Sadness (1973)
- Fantastic Planet (1973)
- Heavy Traffic (1973)
- Johnny Corncob (1973)
- Closed Mondays (1974)
- The Diary (1974)
- Miracle of Flight (1974)
- Sisyphus (1974)
- Arabesque (1975)
- Coonskin (1975)
- Great (1975)
- Hedgehog in the Fog (1975)
- Quasi at the Quackadero (1975)
- 200 (1975)
- Allegro Non Troppo (1976)
- Scenes with Beans (1976)
- The Street (1976)
- Bead Game (1977)
- A Doonesbury Special (1977)
- The Sand Castle (1977)
- Wizards (1977)
- Afterlife (1978)
- Rowing Across the Atlantic (1978)
- Satiemania (1978)
- Watership Down (1978)
- Ringing Bell (1978)
- Asparagus (1979)
- Bubble Bath (1979)
- Free Radicals (1979)
- Sunstone (1979)
- Exodus towards the Light (1979)
- Tale of Tales (1979)
- The Fly (1980)
- The King and the Mockingbird (1980)
- Moon Breath Beat (1980)
- Suur Tõll (1980)
- American Pop (1981)
- Son of the White Mare (1981)
- Tango (1981)
- Dimensions of Dialogue (1982)
- The Great Cognito (1982)
- The Last Unicorn (1982)
- The Plague Dogs (1982)
- The Snowman (1982)
- Thunder (1982)
- Time Masters (1982)
- Fire and Ice (1983)
- Heroic Times (1983)
- Rock & Rule (1983)
- The Weatherman (1983)
- Jumping (1984)
- Nausicaä of the Valley of the Wind (1984)
- Paradise (1984)
- Anijam (1984)
- The Adventures of Mark Twain (1985)
- Angel's Egg (1985)
- The Big Snit (1985)
- Gwen, or the Book of Sand (1985)
- Night on the Galactic Railroad (1985)
- Voices (1985)
- The Pied Piper (1986)
- Castle in the Sky (1986)
- Cat City (1986)
- The Cosmic Eye (1986)
- The Elm-Chanted Forest (1986)
- A Greek Tragedy (1986)
- Street of Crocodiles (1986)
- When the Wind Blows (1986)
- Investigation Led by Kolobki (1987)
- The Brave Little Toaster (1987)
- Breakfast on the Grass (1987)
- The Man Who Planted Trees (1987)
- Wicked City (1987)
- Robot Carnival (1987)
- Lupo the Butcher (1987)
- Your Face (1987)
- Neo Tokyo (1987)
- Gandahar (1987)
- The Flying Luna Clipper (1987)
- Who Framed Roger Rabbit (1988)
- Akira (1988)
- Alice (1988)
- The Cat Came Back (1988)
- Shan shui qing (1988)
- Grave of the Fireflies (1988)
- My Neighbor Totoro (1988)
- The Wind (1988)
- Treasure Island (1988)
- Balance (1989)
- Kiki's Delivery Service (1989)
- The Journey to Melonia (1989)
- Hen, His Wife (1990)
- A Wind Named Amnesia (1990)
- 5/4 (1990)
- Blackfly (1991)
- Only Yesterday (1991)
- Reci, Reci, Reci (1991)
- Roujin Z (1991)
- The Sandman (1991)
- Strings (1991)
- Mona Lisa Descending a Staircase (1992)
- Porco Rosso (1992)
- Midori (1992)
- The Tune (1992)
- Bob's Birthday (1993)
- Ginga no Uo Ursa Minor Blue (1993)
- The Thief and the Cobbler (1993)
- Faust (1994)
- Felidae (1994)
- The Monk and the Fish (1994)
- Pom Poko (1994)
- Triangle (1994)
- Ghost in the Shell (1995)
- 1895 (1995)
- Memories (1995)
- Spring and Chaos (1996)
- Famous Fred (1996)
- Perfect Blue (1997)
- The End of Evangelion (1997)
- The Old Lady and the Pigeons (1997)
- Princess Mononoke (1997)
- At The Edge of the Earth (1998)
- Glassy Ocean (1998)
- I Married a Strange Person (1998)
- Noiseman Sound Insect (1998)
- Kirikou and the Sorceress (1998)
- The Prince of Egypt (1998)
- Fantasia 2000 (1999)
- The Iron Giant (1999)
- My Grandmother Ironed the King's Shirts (1999)
- My Neighbors the Yamadas (1999)
- The Old Man and the Sea (1999)
- When the Day Breaks (1999)

=== 21st century ===
- Little Otik (2000)
- Vampire Hunter D (2000)
- Metropolis (2001)
- Millennium Actress (2001)
- Waking Life (2001)
- Spirited Away (2001)
- Cat Soup (2001)
- Mt. Head (2002)
- Tamala 2010: A Punk Cat in Space (2002)
- Interstella 5555 (2003)
- The Triplets of Belleville (2003)
- Winter Days (2003)
- Destino (2003)
- Tokyo Godfathers (2003)
- Ghost in the Shell 2: Innocence (2004)
- Howl's Moving Castle (2004)
- Mind Game (2004)
- Dead Leaves (2004)
- The Piano Tuner of Earthquakes (2005)
- Paprika (2006)
- Blood Tea and Red String (2006)
- The Danish Poet (2006)
- A Scanner Darkly (2006)
- Pale Cocoon (2006)
- Azur & Asmar: The Princes' Quest (2006)
- We Are The Strange (2007)
- Persepolis (2007)
- A Country Doctor (2007)
- Imagination (2007)
- Idiots and Angels (2008)
- Waltz with Bashir (2008)
- Sita Sings the Blues (2008)
- La Maison en Petits Cubes (2008)
- $9.99 (2008)
- Coraline (2009)
- Mary and Max (2009)
- The Secret of Kells (2009)
- A Town Called Panic (2009)
- Fantastic Mr. Fox (2009)
- The Illusionist (2010)
- Colorful (2010)
- Chico and Rita (2011)
- Muybridge's Strings (2011)
- Wrinkles (2011)
- Alois Nebel (2011)
- A Cat in Paris (2011)
- From Up on Poppy Hill (2011)
- The Rabbi's Cat (2011)
- The King of Pigs (2011)
- Tatsumi (2011)
- The Tragedy of Man (2011)
- Consuming Spirits (2012)
- Don't Hug Me I'm Scared (2012)
- It's Such a Beautiful Day (2012)
- Wolf Children (2012)
- Ernest & Celestine (2012)
- Zarafa (2012)
- Aya of Yop City (2013)
- Boy and the World (2013)
- The Tale of the Princess Kaguya (2013)
- The Congress (2013)
- The Wind Rises (2013)
- Rocks in My Pockets (2014)
- Song of the Sea (2014)
- The Wanted 18 (2014)
- April and the Extraordinary World (2015)
- Anomalisa (2015)
- In This Corner of the World (2016)
- My Life as a Courgette (2016)
- The Red Turtle (2016)
- Apocalypsis (2016)
- Seoul Station (2016)
- Tower (2016)
- The Girl Without Hands (2016)
- The Big Bad Fox and Other Tales (2017)
- The Breadwinner (2017)
- Garden Party (2017)
- Have a Nice Day (2017)
- Loving Vincent (2017)
- Tito and the Birds (2018)
- This Magnificent Cake! (2018)
- The Wolf House (2018)
- Dilili in Paris (2018)
- Isle of Dogs (2018)
- Ruben Brandt, Collector (2018)
- Animal Behaviour (2019)
- I Lost My Body (2019)
- Bombay Rose (2019)
- No.7 Cherry Lane (2019)
- Puparia (2020)
- The Nose or the Conspiracy of Mavericks (2020)
- Wolfwalkers (2020)
- Josep (2020)
- Accidental Luxuriance of the Translucent Watery Rebus (2020)
- Violet Evergarden: The Movie (2020)
- Soul (2020)
- Bestia (2021)
- Boxballet (2021)
- Cryptozoo (2021)
- Flee (2021)
- My Sunny Maad (2021)
- The Summit of the Gods (2021)
- Where Is Anne Frank? (2021)
- The Windshield Wiper (2021)
- Mad God (2021)
- Marcel the Shell with Shoes On (2021)
- The Spine of Night (2021)
- Blind Willow, Sleeping Woman (2022)
- Guillermo del Toro's Pinocchio (2022)
- Pachyderme (2022)
- Unicorn Wars (2022)
- Letter to a Pig (2022)
- Ninety-Five Senses (2022)
- The Black Pharaoh, the Savage and the Princess (2022)
- The Boy and the Heron (2023)
- Emesis Blue (2023)
- Mars Express (2023)
- Our Uniform (2023)
- The Peasants (2023)
- Robot Dreams (2023)
- Spider-Man: Across the Spider-Verse (2023)
- Butterfly (2024)
- Flow (2024)
- Memoir of a Snail (2024)
- Savages (2024)
- Grand Theft Hamlet (2024)
- Living Large (2024)
- Mononoke the Movie: Phantom in the Rain (2024)
- Arco (2025)
- Death Does Not Exist (2025)
- Endless Cookie (2025)
- The Girl Who Cried Pearls (2025)
- Little Amélie or the Character of Rain (2025)
- Scarlet (2025)
- Wildwood (2026)

== Notable arthouse animators ==
- Walerian Borowczyk
- Suzan Pitt
- Claude Barras
- Jiri Barta
- Bruno Bozzetto
- Sylvain Chomet
- Gene Deitch
- Michaël Dudok de Wit
- Adam Elliot
- Ari Folman
- Don Hertzfeldt
- Mamoru Hosoda
- John and Faith Hubley
- Marcell Jankovics
- Andrei Khrzhanovsky
- Robert Sahakyants
- Satoshi Kon
- Yoji Kuri
- René Laloux
- Richard Linklater
- Hayao Miyazaki
- Tomm Moore
- Yuri Norstein
- Michel Ocelot
- Mamoru Oshii
- Katsuhiro Otomo
- Eric Leiser
- Michaela Pavlatova
- Stephen and Timothy Quay
- Joanna Quinn
- Lotte Reiniger
- Ivan Maximov
- Martin Rosen
- Dash Shaw
- Jan Švankmajer
- Osamu Tezuka
- Alexander Tatarsky
- Igor Kovalyov
- Masaaki Yuasa
- Karel Zeman
- Hideaki Anno
- Nora Twomey

== See also ==
- Studio Ghibli
- Laika, LLC
- Cartoon Saloon
- Independent animation
- Adult animation
- Cult film
- Experimental animation
- Rotoscoping
- Modernist film
  - Postmodernist film
- Minimalist film
  - Maximalist film
- Avant-garde film
- Indiewood
