= Zagreb school of animated films =

Style of animation originating from Zagreb, Croatia

Zagreb school of animated films is a style of animation originating from Zagreb, Croatia, most notably Zagreb Film. It is represented by authors like Nikola Kostelac, Vatroslav Mimica, Dušan Vukotić and Vladimir Kristl. The term was coined by Georges Sadoul.

The "golden age" of Zagreb School spanned between 1957 and 1980, in three waves, each dominated by a different group of animators. The first major success was a Grand Prix award in Venice for the animated short Samac ("Lonely guy") by Vatroslav Mimica, and their greatest work is an Oscar-winning animated short Surogat by Dušan Vukotić.

== History ==
The history of animation in Zagreb begins in 1922, with two short animated commercials done by Sergej Tagatz. The first production company "Škola narodnog zdravlja" (represented by director Milan Marjanović, artist Petar Papp) continued making animated shorts such as Macin Nos, Ivin Zub and Martin u nebo in the period 1928 - 1929. In the 30s, more animated commercials were produced by Maar-Reklama film company.

Following World War II, Walter Neugebauer created the animated film Svi na izbore in 1945, under heavy influence of Disney animation. This was followed by other satirical works such as the propaganda film Veliki miting, produced in 1951 by Jadran Film.

According to researcher Ronald Holloway, the two primary influences on the Zagreb School were Jiří Trnka's film The Gift (1947) and the American film The Four Poster, a live-action comedy-drama that features animation directed by John Hubley at United Productions of America (UPA). The Four Poster arrived Yugoslavia in "a batch of American feature films sent for possible sale to Yugoslavia", Holloway wrote, around the same time that director Dušan Vukotić read an article about UPA's style in Graphis at an English bookstore in Zagreb. Vukotić and others studied The Four Poster's animation, which also gave them a greater understanding of the still images in Graphis. As a result, the team began to explore design-focused limited animation at Zagreb Film. The animation of Zagreb made its first major breakthrough with the short Samac (1958) by Vatroslav Mimica, which won the Grand Prix at the Venice Film Festival. This was followed by the 1961 short Surogat by Dušan Vukotić, which won the Academy Award for Best Animated Short Film, the first non-American to do so. First animated shows began appearing during his time, such as Inspektor Maska (1962–1963), and the internationally renown Professor Balthazar (1967–1978) by Zlatko Grgić.

The group's strong reception in North America is evident from frequent screenings, major retrospectives at MoMA by the late 1970s, and the preservation of Zagreb Film prints in archives such as the Harvard Film Archive.

During the 80s and 90s, Croatia Film produced the country's first animated features, all directed by Milan Blažeković: The Elm-Chanted Forest, The Magician's Hat and Lapitch the Little Shoemaker.

== Style and themes ==
The Zagreb School drew from a wide range of artistic and philosophical influences, besides Walt Disney, Jiří Trnka, there are also elements of German Expressionism, New Objectivity, Dada, Dziga Vertov, and the satirical drawings of George Grosz, alongside elements of Suprematism, Surrealism, and Mondrian's geometric abstraction. While visually indebted to these modernist traditions, the films developed a distinctive aesthetic and thematic direction. As Paul Morton notes, unlike Czech or Soviet animation rooted in national or domestic themes, the Zagreb School engaged with universal concerns such as industrialization, militarism, environmental degradation, and the pressures of commercialization and mass culture. In 1969, Looney Tunes animator Chuck Jones remarked, “People talk about the ‘Zagreb School,’ but I just came back from Yugoslavia, and I know they're going off in all directions,” highlighting the diversity and evolving nature of animation practices emerging from Zagreb at the time.

According to Joško Marušić, the key feature of the Zagreb School was commitment to stylization, in contrast with the Disney-style canon of realistic animation. Its worldview created a "genre of animated films for adults, films pregnant with cynicism, auto-irony, and the relativization of divisions between people", often focusing on the "little man" as a powerless subject of manipulation.

Vlado Kristl’s groundbreaking animation Don Kihot, produced at the Zagreb Film studio in 1961, exemplifies an experimental approach in which character design is reduced to forms reminiscent of Suprematism and the art of Paul Klee, while abstract fresco-like backgrounds and atonal music further emphasize the film’s departure from conventional animation aesthetics.

== Animation awards ==
Animafest Zagreb was initiated by the International Animated Film Association (ASIFA), the event was established in 1972. Animafest is the second oldest animation festival in the World, after the Annecy International Animated Film Festival, (established in 1960). Festival awards include prizes given in the Short film Competition, Feature film Competition, Student Film Competition, Children's Films, Site-specific competition and Croatian competition. Its Prize for "Best First Production Apart from Educational Institutions" is named in honour of Zlatko Grgić. The Lifetime Achievement Award, which is unique for animation film festivals, was established in 1986. An award for outstanding contribution to the theory of animation was added in 2002.

== See also ==
- Zagreb Film
- Croatia Film
- Surogat
- Don Kihot
- Professor Balthazar
- The Little Flying Bears
