= Minimalist film =

Cinema related to the philosophy of minimalism

Minimalist film is related to the art and philosophy of minimalism with films.

== Background ==
In film, minimalism usually is associated with filmmakers such as Robert Bresson, Chantal Akerman, Carl Theodor Dreyer, and Yasujirō Ozu. Their films typically tell a simple story with straightforward camera usage and minimal use of score. Paul Schrader named their kind of cinema: "transcendental cinema".

Currently a commitment to minimalist filmmaking can be seen in film movements such as Dogme 95, mumblecore, and the Romanian New Wave. Abbas Kiarostami, Elia Suleiman, and Kelly Reichardt are also considered minimalist filmmakers.

== Notable filmmakers ==
This type of film includes the works of directors like:

- Georgiy Daneliya
- Andrei Tarkovsky
- Michelangelo Antonioni
- Scott Barley
- James Benning
- Robert Bresson
- John Carpenter
- John Cassavetes
- Paul Driessen
- Morgan Fisher
- Hollis Frampton
- Ernie Gehr
- Larry Gottheim
- Don Hertzfeldt
- Walter Hill
- Jim Jarmusch
- Abbas Kiarostami
- Louis Malle
- Norman McLaren
- Yasujirō Ozu
- Jafar Panahi
- Kelly Reichardt
- Peter Roehr
- Gus van Sant
- Don Siegel
- Michael Snow
- Alexander Sokurov
- Tsai Ming-Liang
- Andy Warhol
- Chloé Zhao

== List of notable minimalist films ==
=== 1920-1949 ===
Year	Film	Director
1928	The Passion of Joan of Arc	Carl Theodor Dreyer
1940	Dots	Norman McLaren
1946	Paisan	Roberto Rossellini
1948	Rope	Alfred Hitchcock
1949	I Shot Jesse James	Samuel Fuller
1949	Begone Dull Care	Evelyn Lambart and Norman McLaren

=== 1950-1959 ===
Year	Film	Director
1951	Gerald McBoing Boing	Robert Cannon
1953	Monsieur Hulot's Holiday	Jacques Tati
1953	The Tell Tale Heart	Ted Parmelee
1953	Tokyo Story	Yasujirō Ozu
1954	Billy Boy	Tex Avery
1955	The Big Combo	Joseph H. Lewis
1955	Ordet	Carl Theodore Dreyer
1956	A Man Escaped	Robert Bresson
1956	The Red Balloon	Albert Lamorisse
1957	12 Angry Men	Sidney Lumet
1958	Elevator to the Gallows	Louis Malle
1958	Shadows	John Cassavetes
1959	Plan 9 from Outer Space	Ed Wood
1959	Pickpocket	Robert Bresson

=== 1960-1969 ===
Year	Film	Director
1961	The Do-It-Yourself Cartoon Kit	Bob Godfrey
1961	Surogat	Dušan Vukotić
1962	An Autumn Afternoon	Yasujirō Ozu
1962	Eegah	Arch Hall Sr.
1963	Winter Light	Ingmar Bergman
1964	Diamonds of the Night	Jan Němec
1964	Fail Safe	Sidney Lumet
1964	The Pink Phink	Friz Freleng
1964	Red Desert	Michelangelo Antonioni
1966	Au hasard Balthazar	Robert Bresson
1967	Mouchette	Robert Bresson
1967	Wavelength	Michael Snow
1968	The Fly	Vladimir Jutrisa and Aleksandar Marks
1968	2001: A Space Odyssey	Stanley Kubrick
1968	Surface Tension	Hollis Frampton
1969	Bambi Meets Godzilla	Marv Newland
1969	Lemon	Hollis Frampton

=== 1970-1979 ===
Year	Film	Director
1970	Serene Velocity	Ernie Gehr
1971	Duel	Steven Spielberg
1971	Two-Lane Blacktop	Monte Hellman
1972	Silent Running	Douglas Trumbull
1973	Fantastic Planet	Rene Laloux
1974	The Conversation	Francis Ford Coppola
1974	Dark Star	John Carpenter
1974	Sisyphus	Marcell Jankovics
1975	Grey Gardens	Albert and David Maysles
1975	Hedgehog in the Fog	Yuri Norstein
1975	Jeanne Dielman, 23 quai du Commerce, 1080 Bruxelles	Chantal Akerman
1976	Assault on Precinct 13	John Carpenter
1976	Taxi Driver	Martin Scorsese
1977	David	Paul Driessen
1977	Suspiria	Dario Argento
1977	Mimino	Georgiy Daneliya
1978	Days of Heaven	Terrence Malick
1978	The Driver	Walter Hill
1978	Halloween	John Carpenter
1979	Mad Max	George Miller

=== 1980-1989 ===
Year	Film	Director
1981	My Dinner with Andre	Louis Malle
1982	Liquid Sky	Slava Tsukerman
1983	Koyaanisqatsi	Godfrey Reggio
1984	Charade	Jon Minnis
1984	Secret Honor	Robert Altman
1984	Stop Making Sense	Jonathan Demme
1984	Stranger Than Paradise	Jim Jarmusch
1986	Down by Law	Jim Jarmusch
1986	Luxo Jr.	John Lasseter
1986	Kin-dza-dza!	Georgiy Daneliya
1987	Full Metal Jacket	Stanley Kubrick
1987	Swimming to Cambodia	Jonathan Demme
1988	Alice	Jan Svankmajer
1988	It's Impossible to Learn to Plow by Reading Books	Richard Linklater
1989	Leningrad Cowboys Go America	Aki Kaurismaki
1989	The Seventh Continent	Michael Haneke

=== 1990-1999 ===
Year	Film	Director
1990	The Match Factory Girl	Aki Kaurismäki
1990	Metropolitan	Whit Stillman
1993	Blue	Derek Jarman
1994	Chungking Express	Wong Kar-wai
1994	Clerks	Kevin Smith
1995	Before Sunrise	Richard Linklater
1995	Safe	Todd Haynes
1997	Gattaca	Andrew Niccol
1997	Little Dieter Needs to Fly	Werner Herzog
1997	A Taste of Cherry	Abbas Kiarostami
1998	Festen	Thomas Vinterberg
1999	American Beauty	Sam Mendes
1999	The Blair Witch Project	Daniel Myrick and Eduardo Sánchez
1999	The Wind Will Carry Us	Abbas Kiarostami

=== 2000-2009 ===
Year	Film	Director
2000	Cast Away	Robert Zemeckis
2000	George Washington	David Gordon Green
2000	In the Mood for Love	Wong Kar-wai
2001	Y tu mamá también	Alfonso Cuarón
2001	Tape	Richard Linklater
2002	Gerry	Gus van Sant
2002	Ten	Abbas Kiarostami
2003	Dogville	Lars von Trier
2003	Open Water	Chris Kentis
2003	The Triplets of Belleville	Sylvain Chomet
2004	Before Sunset	Richard Linklater
2005	Brick	Rian Johnson
2005	The Death of Mr. Lazarescu	Cristi Puiu
2005	Hard Candy	David Slade
2006	Old Joy	Kelly Reichardt
2006	Electroma	Daft Punk
2007	I'm Not There	Todd Haynes
2007	Once	John Carney
2008	Baghead	Jay and Mark Duplass
2008	WALL-E	Andrew Stanton
2008	Wendy and Lucy	Kelly Reichardt
2009	Moon	Duncan Jones

=== 2010-2019 ===
Year	Film	Director
2010	Beyond the Black Rainbow	Panos Cosmatos
2010	Winter's Bone	Debra Granik
2011	Hanna	Joe Wright
2011	Once Upon a Time in Anatolia	Nuri Bilge Ceylan
2011	The Turin Horse	Ágnes Hranitzky and Bela Tarr
2012	It's Such a Beautiful Day	Don Hertzfeldt
2012	The Master	Paul Thomas Anderson
2013	All Is Lost	J.C. Chandor
2013	Gravity	Alfonso Cuarón
2013	Before Midnight	Richard Linklater
2013	Locke	Steven Knight
2013	Only Lovers Left Alive	Jim Jarmusch
2013	Under the Skin	Jonathan Glazer
2013	Visitors	Godfrey Reggio
2015	The Killing of a Sacred Deer	Yorgos Lanthimos
2015	The Revenant	Alejandro González Iñárritu
2015	Room	Lenny Abrahamson
2016	Certain Women	Kelly Reichardt
2016	My Life as a Zucchini	Claude Barras
2016	Piper	Alan Barillaro
2016	The Red Turtle	Michael Dudok de Wit
2016	10 Cloverfield Lane	Dan Trachtenberg
2017	Sleep Has Her House	Scott Barley
2017	The Rider	Chloé Zhao
2018	Isle of Dogs	Wes Anderson
2018	Roma	Alfonso Cuarón
2019	Away	Gints Zilbalodis
2019	First Cow	Kelly Reichardt
2019	Sound of Metal	Darius Marder

=== 2020 onwards ===
Year	Film	Director
2020	Friend of the World	Brian Patrick Butler
2020	If Anything Happens I Love You	Will McCormack and Michael Govier
2020	Minari	Lee Isaac Chung
2020	Nomadland	Chloé Zhao
2020	Wolfwalkers	Tomm Moore and Ross Stewart
2020	The Woman Who Ran	Hong Sang-soo
2021	Belfast	Kenneth Branagh
2021	The Tragedy of Macbeth	Joel Coen
2021	Pig	Michael Sarnoski
2022	Marcel the Shell with Shoes On	Dean Fleischer Camp
2022	Saint Omer	Alice Diop
2022	Skinamarink	Kyle Edward Ball
2022	Tár	Todd Field
2022	Women Talking	Sarah Polley
2023	Fallen Leaves	Aki Kaurismäki
2023	Past Lives	Celine Song
2023	Perfect Days	Wim Wenders
2023	Robot Dreams	Pablo Berger
2023	Showing Up	Kelly Reichardt
2024	All We Imagine as Light	Payal Kapadia
2024	Flow	Gints Zilbalodis
2024	In the Shadow of the Cypress	Hossein Molayemi and Shirin Sohani

== See also ==
- Arthouse animation
- Maximalist film
- Postmodernist film
- Slow cinema
- Minimalist music
- Art film
- American Eccentric Cinema
- Modernist film
- Arthouse musical
- Vulgar auteurism
- American independent cinema
- Structural film
