= Tup Tup =

1972 animated short film by Nedjeljko Dragić

- Directed by: Nedeljko Dragić
- Produced by: Nedeljko Dragić
- Music by: Tomica Simović
- Production company: Zagreb Film
- Release date: January 1, 1972
- Running time: 10 minutes
- Country: SFR Yugoslavia
- Language: none

Tup Tup is a 1972 Yugoslav animated short by Nedeljko Dragić at Zagreb Film animation studio, in cooperation with Corona Cinematografica in Italy.

== Plot ==
A man is trying to go to sleep but a noise keeps him up. In the process of trying to stop the noise, he exposes a bizarre mixture of sounds and images.

== Accolades ==
It was nominated for an Academy Award for Best Animated Short Film, but lost to Richard Williams' take on A Christmas Carol.

== Reception and legacy ==
In a 2020 poll among 38 Croatian film critics, Tup tup was ranked as the third best Croatian animated film ever, behind Dušan Vukotić's Academy Award-winning Surogat and Zdenko Gašparović's Satiemania.
