= Joško Marušić =

Croatian artist and filmmaker

Joško Marušić, born in Split on March 27, 1952, is a Croatian author of animated films, caricaturist, illustrator and university professor.

== Biography ==
Joško Marušić was born in Split in 1952, where he graduated from the classical high school, and after that, from the Faculty of Architecture, University of Zagreb in 1975.

An architect by education, he is interested in caricature, comics, illustrations, literature, film production, theory of animation, and was a TV personality with his own TV show.

He is considered one of the most important authors of the Zagreb School of Animated Films. His films won a number of awards at animated and short film festivals – often Grands Prix and other major awards: Annecy, Oberhausen, Ottawa, Zagreb, London, Miami, Chicago, Tampere, Brussels, Melbourne, Madrid, Rotterdam, Belgrade.

He was also art director of the animation studio at Zagreb Film from 1987 to 1989, and again from 1992 to 1998. From 1992 to 1998, he was art director of the Zagreb World Festival of Animated Film (known as Animafest Zagreb). He was a member of numerous film juries, founder of some animated film schools and visiting professor at several European universities. He was the author of the concept and program. Additionally, in 1999, he was the founder and first principal of the Animation and New Media Department (as an entirely new department) at the Academy of Fine Arts, University of Zagreb.

His texts and articles on theory and history of animation were published in books, almanacs and film journals. He illustrated about thirty course books and picture books for kids, for which he won national awards. He is continuously publishing cartoons in magazines and in daily newspapers. He had three solo exhibitions of coloured ink drawings. He wrote several books: some on cartoons, autobiographical essays, illustrated literary-historical work, specialized books on animation.

He won national awards in culture:

- medal Order of Danica Hrvatska (figure of Marko Marulić) https://hr.wikipedia.org/wiki/Dodatak:Popis_nositelja_Reda_Danice_hrvatske_s_likom_Marka_Maruli%C4%87a

- life achievement award for comics https://www.tportal.hr/kultura/clanak/josko-marusic-jedan-od-najproduktivnijih-stripasa-u-povijesti-hrvatske-ovjencan-nagradom-za-zivotno-djelo-andrija-maurovic-20211217/print

- life achievement award for journalism

== Animated films ==
His films won a great number of awards at most important animated film festivals – often Grands Prix and other major awards. Famous theorist and critic on animation Giannalberto Bendazzi selected his film „I Love You, too...“ (1991) for „The Tour of Animation in 84 Films – Jewels of a Century“, his selection of best films in the history of animation (Annecy, 2000).

- "Inside and Out" (1977, Zagreb film)
- "Perpetuo" (1978, Zagreb film)
- "Fisheye" (1980, Zagreb film)
- "Skyscraper" (1981, Zagreb film)
- Festival trailer – Zagreb 1982.
- "Over There" (1985, Zagreb film)
- "Face of Fear" (1986, Zagreb film)
- "Home Is the Best" (1988, Zagreb film)
- "Wind Will Turn" (1990, Zagreb film)
- Film festival Alpe Adria Trieste – festival trailer
- Marušić was the creator of the animated "Eurocat", the official mascot of the Eurovision Song Contest 1990.
- "All for Croatia" (1991, HTV)
- "I Love You, Too..." (1991, Zagreb film)
- "Zoo-Zoom" (1994, Animagination – Lousanne, Switzerland)
- Film in honour of 50th anniversary of United Nations
- "Better Than Father" (1998, Fuji inc. – Tokyo, Japan )
- "Miss Link" (1999, Zagreb film)
- "In the Neighbourhood of the City" (2006, Ars Animata Studio, Zagreb)
- "The Rainbow" – feature animated film (2010, Riblje oko, Zagreb)
- "Why Did They Come by Train" (2015, Zagreb film)
- "Euthanasia" (2018, Zagreb film)
