= Animafest Zagreb =

Film festival in Croatia

- Logo of the 2010 edition
- Location: Zagreb, Croatia
- Founded: 1972
- Language: International
- Website: http://www.animafest.hr/

World Festival of Animated Film Zagreb (Croatian: Svjetski festival animiranog filma), best known as Animafest Zagreb, is a film festival entirely dedicated to animated film held annually in Zagreb, Croatia. Initiated by the International Animated Film Association (ASIFA), the event was established in 1972. Animafest is the second oldest animation festival in the World, after the Annecy International Animated Film Festival (established in 1960).

The idea to create the event came about because of the worldwide acclaim of animated shorts produced by authors belonging to the Zagreb School of Animated Films in the 1950s and 1960s. Zagreb's candidacy for holding a permanent animated film festival was accepted at the 1969 ASIFA meeting in London.

Festival awards include prizes given in the Short film Competition, Feature film Competition, Student Film Competition, Children Films, Site-specific competition and Croatian competition. Its Prize for "Best First Production Apart from Educational Institutions" is named in honour of Zlatko Grgić. The Lifetime Achievement Award, which is unique for animation film festivals, was established in 1986. An award for outstanding contribution to the theory of animation was added in 2002.

== Grand Prize winners ==
From 1972 to 2004 Animafest was a biennial event focused on animated short films, held in even years, with the sole exception of 1976, when it was cancelled. From 2005 to 2015 the festival became an annual event, with feature film editions introduced and held in odd years, in between the short film editions. In 2015 the shorts and features were merged into one annual event.

=== Short films ===
Year	English title	Director(s)	Country
1972	The Battle of Kerzhenets	Ivan Ivanov-Vano and Yuriy Norshteyn	Soviet Union
1974	The Diary	Nedeljko Dragić	Yugoslavia
1976	Festival not held.^{[A]}		
1978	Satiemania	Zdenko Gašparović	Yugoslavia
1980	Tale of Tales	Yuriy Norshteyn	Soviet Union
1982	Grand Prize was not awarded.^{[B]}		
1984	Jumping	Osamu Tezuka	Japan
1986	Grand Prize was not awarded.^{[B]}		
1988	Breakfast on the Grass	Priit Pärn	Soviet Union
1990	The Brooch Pin And The Sinful Clasp	JoWonder	United Kingdom
1992	Franz Kafka	Piotr Dumała	Poland
1994	The Wrong Trousers×	Nick Park	United Kingdom
1996	1895	Priit Pärn and Janno Põldma	Estonia
1998	Rusalka	Aleksandr Petrov	Russia
2000	When the Day Breaks≠	Wendy Tilby and Amanda Forbis	Canada
2002	Father and Daughter×	Michaël Dudok de Wit	Netherlands
2004	Mt. Head≠	Kōji Yamamura	Japan
2006	Dreams and Desires - Family Ties	Joanna Quinn	United Kingdom
2008	The Pearce Sisters	Luis Cook	United Kingdom
2010	Divers in the Rain	Olga Pärn and Priit Pärn	Estonia
2012	Oh Willy...	Emma De Swaef and Marc James Roels	Belgium
2014	Love Games	Yumi Joung	South Korea
2015	We Can't Live Without Cosmos≠	Konstantin Bronzit	Russia
2016	Endgame	Phil Mulloy	United Kingdom
2017	Nighthawk	Špela Čadež	Slovenia Croatia
2018	La Chute	Boris Labbé	France
2019	Acid Rain	Tomek Popakul	Poland
2020	Just A Guy	Shoko Hara	Germany
2021	Night Bus	Joe Hsieh	Taiwan
2022	The Garbage Man	Laura Gonçalves	Portugal
2023	Oneluv	Varya Yakovleva	Russia
2024	The Miracle	Nienke Deutz	Belgium Netherlands France
2025	Dull Spots Of Greenish Colours	Sasha Svirsky	Germany

=== Feature films ===
Year	English title	Director(s)	Country
2005	Terkel in Trouble	Kresten Vestbjerg Andersen, Thorbjørn Christoffersen and Stefan Fjeldmark	Denmark
2007	Azur & Asmar: The Princes' Quest	Michel Ocelot	France
2009	Waltz with Bashir≠	Ari Folman	Israel
2011	My Dog Tulip	Paul Fierlinger and Sandra Fierlinger	United States
2013	Approved for Adoption	Laurent Boileau and Jung	Belgium France
2015	Boy and the World≠	Alê Abreu	Brazil
2016	The Magic Mountain	Anca Damian	Romania
2017	The Red Turtle≠	Michael Dudok De Wit	France Belgium Japan
2018	This Magnificent Cake!	Emma De Swaef and Marc James Roels	France Belgium Netherlands
2019	Ruben Brandt, Collector	Milorad Krstić	Hungary
2020	Feature Film Competition not held. ^{[C]}		
2021	The Nose or the Conspiracy of Mavericks	Andrey Khrzhanovsky	Russia
2022	My Sunny Maad	Michaela Pavlátová	Czech Republic
2023	My Love Affair with Marriage	Signe Baumane	Latvia United States Luxembourg
2024	Sultana's Dream	Isabel Herguera	Spain Germany
2025	Memoir of a Snail≠	Adam Elliot	Australia

=== Notes ===
- × Oscar winner
- ≠ Oscar nominee

== Footnotes ==
A. In 1976 the festival was cancelled because of the earlier agreement that the three main ASIFA-sponsored festivals (at Annecy, Zagreb and Mamaia, Romania) would be held in three-year cycles, with Mamaia scheduled to take place in 1976. However, Romanian organizers cancelled the event at the last minute. In 1977 the regular festival at Annecy was held and the usual biennial cycle resumed, with Zagreb and Annecy taking turns.
B. Although Animafest was held in 1982 and 1986, no Grand Prizes were awarded in these two editions.
C. Animafest 2020 edition was held live in Zagreb, but due to coronavirus pandemic restrictions, it was decided for an edition without a Feature Film Competition.

== Lifetime Achievement Award laureates ==
Year	Director	Country
1986	Norman McLaren	Canada
1988	Chuck Jones	U.S.A.
1990	John Halas	United Kingdom
1992	Bob Godfrey	United Kingdom
1994	Dušan Vukotić	Croatia
1996	Caroline Leaf	Canada
1998	Bruno Bozzetto	Italy
2000	Jan Švankmajer	Czech Republic
2002	Paul Driessen	Netherlands/Canada
2004	Hayao Miyazaki	Japan
2006	Fyodor Khitruk	Russia
2008	Priit Pärn	Estonia
2010	Frederic Back	Canada
2012	Yoji Kuri	Japan
2014	Yuri Norstein	Russia
2015	Michel Ocelot	France
2016	Raoul Servais	Belgium
2017	Borivoj Dovniković	Croatia
2018	Paul Fierlinger	U.S.A./Czech Republic
2019	Suzan Pitt	U.S.A.
2020	Georges Schwizgebel	Switzerland
2021	Ralph Bakshi	Haifa/U.S.A
2022	Nedeljko Dragić	Croatia
2023	William Kentridge	South Africa
2024	Phil Mulloy	United Kingdom
2025	Michaela Pavlátová	Czech Republic

== Award for outstanding contribution to animation studies laureates ==
Year	Winner	Country
2002	Giannalberto Bendazzi	Italy
2004	Donald Crafton	U.S.A.
2006	John Canemaker	U.S.A.
2008	Clare Kitson	United Kingdom
2010	Midhat Ajanović ("Ajan")	Sweden/Bosnia and Herzegovina
2012	Olivier Cotte	France
2014	Marcel Jean	Canada
2016	Marcin Gizycki	Poland
2017	Maureen Furniss	U.S.A.
2018	Paul Wells	United Kingdom
2019	Jayne Pilling	United Kingdom
2020	Chris Robinson	Canada
2021	Xavier Kawa-Topor	France
2022	Rolf Giesen	Germany
2023	Suzanne Buchan	United Kingdom
2024	Ingo Petzke	Germany
2025	Georges Sifianos	Greece

== See also ==
- List of animation awards
- Other ASIFA-sponsored animated film festivals:
  - Annecy International Animated Film Festival (est. 1960)
  - Ottawa International Animation Festival (est. 1976)
  - Hiroshima International Animation Festival (est. 1985)
