= Piccolo (1959 film) =

- Directed by: Dušan Vukotić
- Written by: Dušan Vukotić
- Color process: Eastmancolor
- Production company: Zagreb Film
- Release date: 15 November 1959
- Running time: 9 minutes
- Country: Yugoslavia
- Language: Serbo-Croat

Piccolo is a 1959 Yugoslavian film.

== Plot ==
Two men live in neighboring apartments. They are good friends and help each other out however possible. However, when one of them starts playing his piccolo to accompany the song of a nearby bird, the other gets angry. They proceed to play louder instruments than the other, even hiring extra people to assist.

== Credits ==
- A production of: Zagreb Film Cartoon Studio, Yugoslavia
- Color by: Eastmancolor
- Scenario: Dušan Vukotić
- Backgrounds: Zvonimir Lončarić
- Music: Branimir Sakač
- Book recording: Dušan Vukotić, Boris Kolar
- Key animator: Vladimir Hrs
- Animation: Stanko Garber, Rudolf Mudrovčić
- Assistant director: Slavko Marjanac
- Music supervisor: Tea Brunšmid
- Sound: Mladen Prebil
- Cinematography: Ivan Goričanec, Miroslav Margetić
- Titles: Josip Pilat
- Other realizers: Members of the Cartoon Studio
- Chief cartoonist and director: Dusan Vukotic
