= Borivoj Dovniković =

Croatian film director (1930–2022)

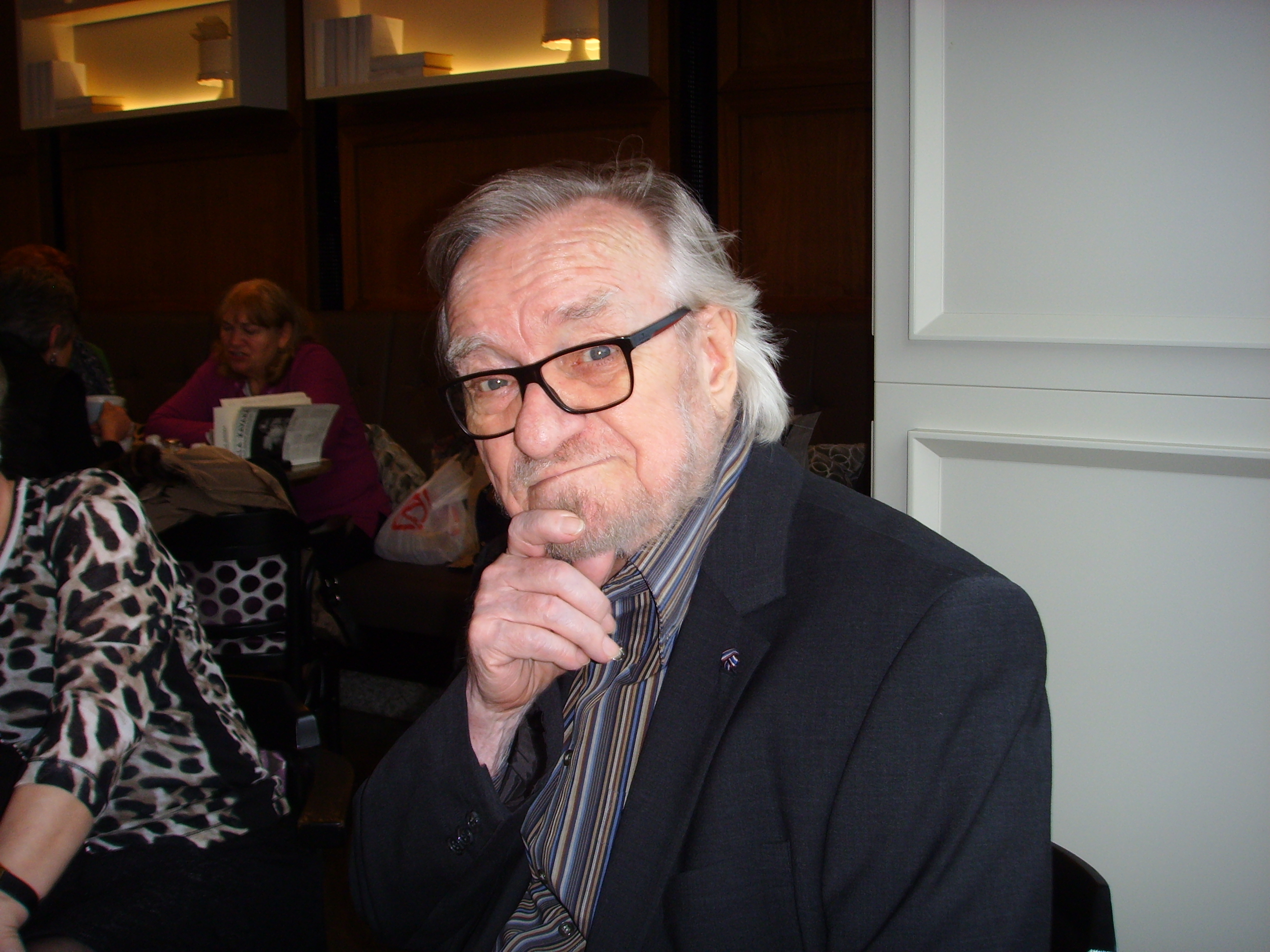
- Dovniković in 2017
- Born: 12 December 1930; Osijek, Yugoslavia (present-day Croatia)
- Died: 8 February 2022 (aged 91); Zagreb, Croatia
- Occupations: Film director, animator

Borivoj Dovniković (12 December 1930 – 8 February 2022) was a Croatian film director, animator, comic artist and caricaturist. He was a prominent member of the Zagreb school of animated films style.

== Biography ==
Dovniković was born in Osijek, Yugoslavia, on 12 December 1930. During the World War II in Yugoslavia and the existence of the Independent State of Croatia Borivoj and his father escaped to Serbia. In 1949, he arrived in Zagreb where he enrolled at the Academy of Fine Arts and started to work as a caricaturist and illustrator in newspapers. Subsequently, he got a job at a local newspaper called Kerempuh in 1950. He participated in the making of the first Croatian animated art film Veliki Miting (The Great Meeting) and, in 1957, he joins the Zagreb Film company, from where he created and worked on animated shorts and movies. This led to the creation of Lutkica (The Doll) in 1961, his first fully own creation. From 1977 to 1982 he was a member of the International Animated Film Association and was a board member of Animafest Zagreb festival. Between 1994 and 2022 Dovniković wrote a comic the "Čipko and Grampa Filip" for youth magazine Bijela pčela published in Rijeka by SKD Prosvjeta.

Dovniković died in Zagreb on 8 February 2022, at the age of 91. In 2024, the City Assembly of Zagreb named a park in Trešnjevka-north after Borivoj Dovniković.
