= Inspektor se vratio kući =

Inspektor se vratio kući The Inspector Is Back
- Poster
- Directed by: Vatroslav Mimica
- Production company: Zagreb Film
- Release date: 1959
- Running time: 11 minutes
- Country: SFR Yugoslavia
- Language: none

Inspektor se vratio kući (English: The Inspector Comes Home) is a 1959 animated short film directed by Vatroslav Mimica for Zagreb Film. It is described as a dizzying existentialist parable about an inept police inspector chasing his own fingerprint. Mimica collaborated with animator Aleksandar Marks and background artist Zlatko Bourek.

== Reception ==
According to Animafest artistic director Danijel Šuljić, Inspektor se vratio kući was one of the most innovative animations for its time due to its "flat graphic style, experiments with perspective, space, and depth, and limited animation" being taken to a completely new level. It won the first prize at International Short Film Festival Oberhausen. The short film became popular enough to spawn a separate animated series called Inspektor Maska, which started production in 1962.

Zippy Frames says of the film; "The film certainly features a kind of wry humour, yet in a distinctive visual way. Just check the middle part of the film, where the inspector looks for the suspect fingerprint. Instead of himself running to get it, the different city backgrounds appear one after the other, just like stage curtains, with the main character essentially immobilized. It is as if the city itself orchestrates the inspector's own movements, with all the poignant connotations that would imply. Newspaper clips, Hollywood starlets, a jazzy soundtrack and a plot which becomes visually even more complicated and abstract than it had already been, makes this a really distinctive, convoluted, animated film noir."
