= The Musical Pig =

1966 animated short by Zlatko Grgić

The Musical Pig (Croatian: Muzikalno prase) is a 1966 animated short by Zlatko Grgić about an unlucky little pig with a gift for singing. Grgić was assisted by Borivoj Dovniković during the writing of the script.

== Synopsis ==
"A pig with a magnificent voice who wants to be listened to and appreciated. He goes to one person after another, but their ears are deaf, they see him as roast pork, utter a hunting cry and seize a knife".

== Accolades ==
The short competed for the Short Film Award at the 1966 Cannes Film Festival.
