= Rudolf Sremec =

Yugoslav and Croatian film director

- Born: 18 August 1909; Vinkovci, Kingdom of Croatia-Slavonia, Austria-Hungary
- Died: 16 August 1999 (aged 89); Zagreb, Croatia
- Occupations: Film director, screenwriter
- Years active: 1945–1991

Rudolf Sremec (18 August 1909 – 16 August 1999) was a Yugoslav and Croatian film director. He is regarded as one of the most important Croatian authors of short documentary films. In a career spanning four decades, Sremec directed and wrote some 90 documentary shorts, mainly dealing with various cultural and anthropological topics.

Born in Vinkovci, Sremec graduated from the Zagreb Faculty of Humanities and Social Sciences with a degree in Slavic studies and French language. Sremec began making films in 1945 after spending some time working as a high school teacher.

Apart from documentaries, he directed a handful of live-action short films and he also wrote the screenplay for The Substitute (Surogat; 1961), a short animated film directed by Dušan Vukotić which won the Academy Award for Best Animated Short Film.

Sremec spent a number of years working at the Croatian Radiotelevision and directed a 1981 two-part television film August Šenoa about Croatian writer August Šenoa. He was also a prolific film critic, editor of the Filmska kultura film magazine and taught courses in film history and film theory at the comparative literature department of the Zagreb Faculty of Humanities and Social Sciences.

Sremec was honoured with the Vladimir Nazor Award for life achievement in film in 1976.
