= Cow on the Moon =

- Title card
- Directed by: Dušan Vukotić
- Written by: Dušan Vukotić
- Cinematography: Ivan Hercigonja; Zlatko Sacer
- Music by: Stipica Kalogjera
- Animation by: Zlatko Grgić (head animator); Turido Pauš; Stanko Garber
- Layouts by: Zlatko Grgić (designer)
- Backgrounds by: Ismet Voljevica
- Color process: Eastmancolor
- Production company: Zagreb Film
- Release date: 1 January 1959
- Running time: 10 minutes
- Country: Yugoslavia
- Language: Serbo-Croatian

Cow on the Moon (Serbo-Croatian: Krava na mjesecu) is a 1959 Yugoslavian short film made by Croatian animation studio Zagreb Film. It follows a young girl as she tricks and scares a bully for breaking a small model of a spaceship she made.

== Plot ==
The film begins with a boy playing with a ball down the street until he trips on a hole in the ground. Once a small girl constructing a small wooden spaceship toy laughs at the boy, he goes over to the girl and begins teasing her, eventually breaking the toy and walking away. She gets upset and gets an idea on how to get revenge on him. She obtains wooden materials and goes up the hill to construct a decoy space shuttle. The boy notices it and goes over to the top of the hill. As she is about to "launch" it, the boy gets her to let him test the rocket instead. After he was seated inside the rocket, the little girl began dragging it down the hill and to the nearest stone quarry, with the boy believing that he was flying towards the Moon. Once she finishes dragging the rocket down, she goes away, hides, and makes an alien costume while a cow goes towards the rocket. The boy hears the sounds that the cow made and quickly gets terrified, believing that an alien has noticed him. The cow sees the girl wearing the alien costume and, out of fear, runs away and climbs a tree. The boy exits the rocket and looks around to check if the creature is still nearby, and then notices the girl. Terrified, he does the same as the cow and starts screaming while the girl tries to reach him. He drops down from the tree and rides the cow as the girl continues to scare him until they come back to where the film started. The boy, shocked, watches as the girl reveals that the alien was her and he never actually went to the Moon, causing the cow to laugh uncontrollably.

== Reception ==
The film won multiple awards, such as the first prize at the San Francisco International Film Festival and the 3rd prize for directing at the 1960 Yugoslav film festival in Pula.

== Legacy ==
The short film was adapted into a picture book in 1969. In 2022, the film was remastered in HD and uploaded to YouTube under Zagreb Film's official YouTube channel.
