= The Wall (1966 film) =

1966 short film directed by Ante Zaninović

The Wall (Croatian: Zid) is a 1966 Yugoslav animated short film by Ante Zaninović for Zagreb Film.

== Synopsis ==
A naked, long haired man makes multiple attempts to tackle a high brick was that stands in his way, possibly an allusion to the Berlin Wall. Simultaneously, another figure, in a suit and tie, watches all this passively, even when the bearded man finally breaks the wall and dies. The man in suit passes through the gaping hole with ease, encountering another wall, he continues to wait and act passively. The overall mood of the film is frequently cited as an example of dark humor.

== Reception ==
The short is considered the author's most acclaimed one. Ivo Škrabalo, writing for Globus, described it as one of the exemplary works of the "second wave" of Zagreb animation. Film critic Ronald Holloway praised Zaninović's derisive wit in the short.
