= Midhat Ajanović =

Bosnian-Swedish writer

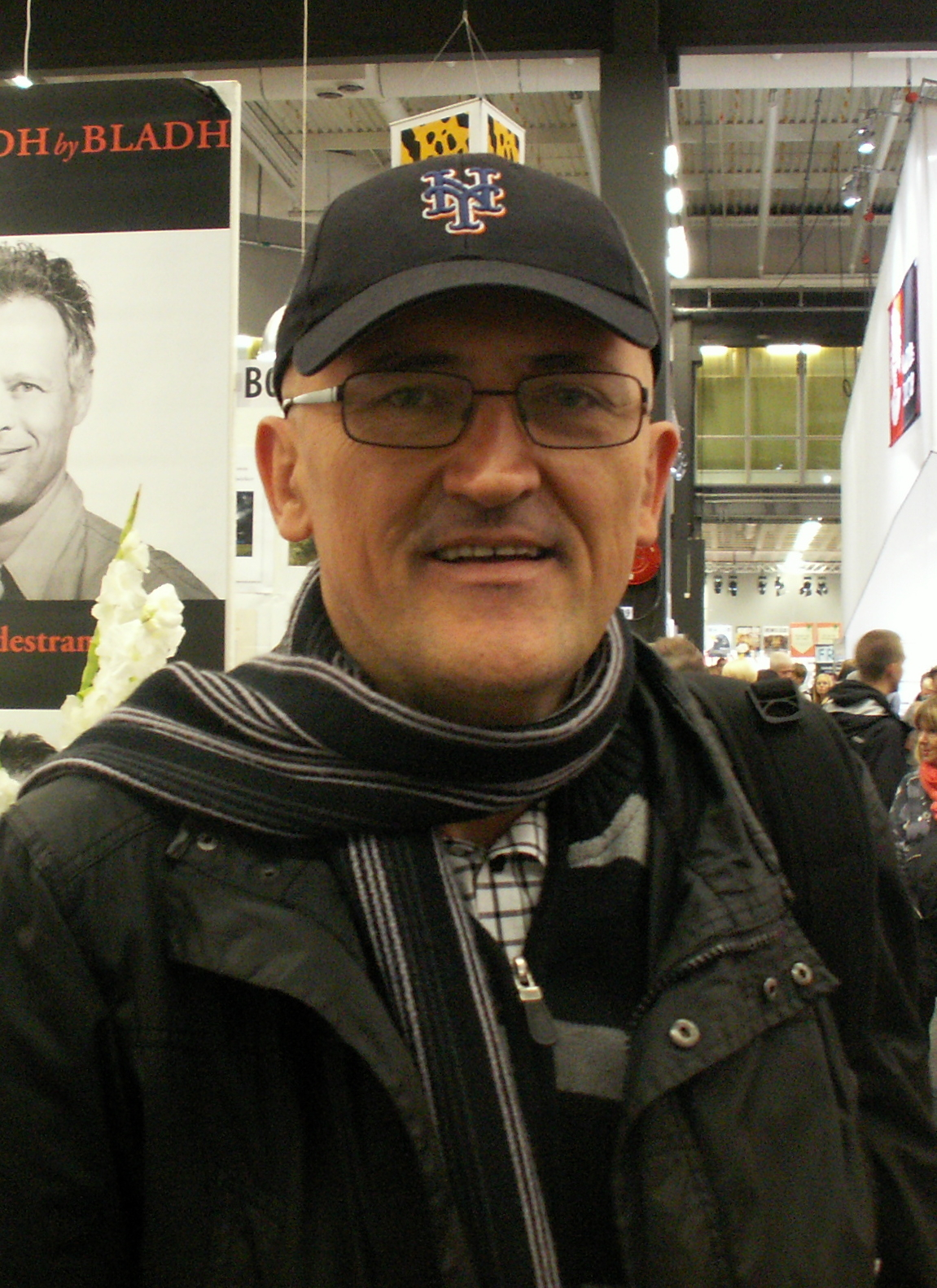
- Midhat Ajanović at the Gothenburg Book Fair, 2012.
- Born: October 20, 1959 (age 66); Sarajevo, SFR Yugoslavia
- Other names: Ajan
- Occupations: Film theorist, animator, novelist, lecturer
- Years active: 1983– (first published novel)
- Notable work: Portret nacrtan ugljem i kišom, Animation and Realism = animacija i realizam, Den rörliga skämtteckningen
- Awards: Klas de Vylder-priset (Gothenburg), Special Contribution to Animation Studies Award (Zagreb)
- Website: ajan.se

Midhat "Ajan" Ajanović (born 20 October 1959) is a Bosnian-Swedish film theorist, animator and novelist. He is a lecturer on animation and in 2009 defended his doctorate thesis on animation, the second one on the subject in Sweden. Since 1983 he has written several novels, most often with Yugoslav/Bosnian themes and published in Bosnian, Croatian or Swedish. In 2010 Ajanović was a laureate at the Animafest Zagreb animation festival, for his achievements in the study of film animation.

== Biography ==
=== Background ===
Ajanović was born and brought up in the Bosnian capital of Sarajevo. He studied literature in Sarajevo and animation in Zagreb. In the 1980s he worked as an editorial cartoonist for the newspaper Oslobođenje, while at the same time producing a couple of animation shorts at the local production company Bosna and both drawing short comic strips and articles for various magazines. From 1985–1990 the weekly Nasi dani printed his weekly comic Ajan. A comics album with the locally well-known pranksters Mujo and Suljo was also published.

In June 1992 Ajanović presented his animation short Voajer on Animafest Zagreb. This was the first film produced in Bosnia and Hercegovina to be presented at an international film festival, following its independence in April of the same year.

=== New country ===
After the outbreak of the Bosnian War (April 1992), living conditions declined considerably. In 1994 Ajanović and his family managed to flee the country, settling in Sweden where the family has since been living. In Sweden he has to some degree continued to draw, but more seldom in animated form. He has regularly drawn cartoons and written texts on animation for several local newspapers, and many of his biographical texts on international animators has since been collected into two books.

Ajanović was, for a couple of years, appointed as a lecturer in film studies at the University of Gothenburg, while also lecturing at the college school in animation at Eksjö. In 2009 he successfully defended his doctorate thesis, Den rörliga skämtteckningen ("The Moving Cartoon"). This was the second time a doctorate thesis about animation was successfully defended at a Swedish university.

Since 2009 he has worked as a lecturer in informatics and animation at University College West.

=== Book production ===
Midhat Ajanović has written eight books on film theory, mainly devoted to animated film. Besides this, he has authored several novels, often centered around the history and milieu of his former homeland Yugoslavia/Bosnia and Herzegovina. The first one, the satirical Kultura srca ("Culture of the Heart") was published in 1983 in Sarajevo, and the following novels has beginning 1998 been published alternatively in Croatian, Bosnian and Swedish. Portret nacrtan ugljem i kišom ('Portrait Drawn in Charcoal and Rain') from 2001 is a dark and atmospherical recollection of memories, where the narrator talks about his history as both cartoonist and hardened criminal. It was translated into Swedish in 2009, and the following year it received the award Klas de Vylder-priset.

== Published works ==
=== Bibliography (first editions) ===
- 1983 – Kultura srca ('Culture of the Heart'), (publisher:) Cedus, Sarajevo (satire, published in Serbo-Croatian)
- 1987 – Strip i film ('Comic Strips and Film'), Sineast, Sarajevo (editor essays, Serbo-Croatian)
- 1993 – Mujo i Suljo ('Mujo and Suljo'), Bemust, Zenica (comics album, Bosnian)
- 1996 – Ajan karikature/Ajan's Cartoons, Bemust, Zenica (cartoons, Bosnian/English)
- 1998 – Jalijaš, Borac, Travnik (novel, Bosnian), ISBN 9958-9174-1-6
- 1999 – Gađan ('The Pitcher'), International Peace Center, Sarajevo (satire, Bosnian), ISBN 91-972858-5-4
- 1999 – Useljenik ('The Immigrant'), Bosniskt kulturcenter, Örebro/Sweden (novel, Bosnian), ISBN 91-972858-7-0
- 2001 – Situationer ('Situations'), Optimal Press, Göteborg (cartoons, Swedish), ISBN 91-88334-45-7
- 2001 – Portret nacrtan ugljem i kišom ('Portrait in Charcoal and Rain'), Ljiljan, Sarajevo (novel, Bosnian)
- 2003 – Katapult, Hrasce, Zagreb (Croatian)
- 2003 – Moji filmovi ('My Films'), Harfograf, Tuzla (essays, Bosnian)
- 2004 – Animation and Realism = animacija i realizam, Hrvatski filmski savez, Zagreb (essays, English/Croatian), ISBN 953-7033-09-0
- 2006 – De visuella tonsättarna – animationens mästare i urval ('The Visual Composers – a choice of masters of animation'), Optimal Press, Göteborg (essays, Swedish), ISBN 91-88334-89-9
- 2008 – Karikatura i pokret ('Caricature and Movement'), Hrvatski filmski savez, Zagreb (essays, Croatian)
- 2009 – Den rörliga skämtteckningen ('The Moving Cartoon'), Optimal Press, Göteborg (doctorate thesis, Swedish), ISBN 978-91-85951-09-3
- 2010 – Život u crtanom filmu/Life in a Cartoon, Hrvatski filmski savez, Zagreb (monography, Croatian/English)
- 2010 – Salijevanje strave ('Digesting Fear'), Una förlag, Göteborg (novel, Bosnian), ISBN 978-91-976350-2-8
- 2012 – De visuella tonsättarna 2, Optimal Press, Göteborg (essays, Swedish), ISBN 978-91-85951-45-1

=== Filmography ===
- 1984 – Heroj ('Hero'), (produced by:) Forum, Sarajevo (animation)
- 1985 – Post scriptum, Bosna film, Sarajevo (animation)
- 1987 – Poruka ('The Message'), Bosna film, Sarajevo (animation)
- 1988 – Rekorder, Bosna film, Sarajevo (animation)
- 1989 – Goya – Munch – Lautrec, Bosna film, Sarajevo (animation)
- 1990 – Ikar ('Icarus'), Bosna film, Sarajevo (partly animated)
- 1992 – Voajer (also known as Voyeur), Atlanta, Sarajevo (partly animated)
- 2001 – The Journalist, Karivold film, Fredrikstad, Norway (documentary)
- 2010 – Point of Mouth, SaGa, Sarajevo (partly animated)
- 2011 – Mi (also Us), SaGa, Sarajevo + Zagreb film, Zagreb (animation/spelfilm)

== Awards and honours ==
- 2010 – Klas de Vylder-priset ("the Klas de Vylder Award")
- 2010 – Special Contribution to Animation Studies Award (Animafest Zagreb)
