= JoWonder =

British painter and author

- Born: Joanna Woodward
- Education: St Martins School of Art, National Film and Television School
- Known for: Visual art, painting, poetry, film, animation, performance, painting
- Movement: Postmodern
- Awards: British Animation Awards 1990 (Best Direction), Animafest 1990 (Grand Prize), Time Out Film Award, Cartazini Biennial Award 2019

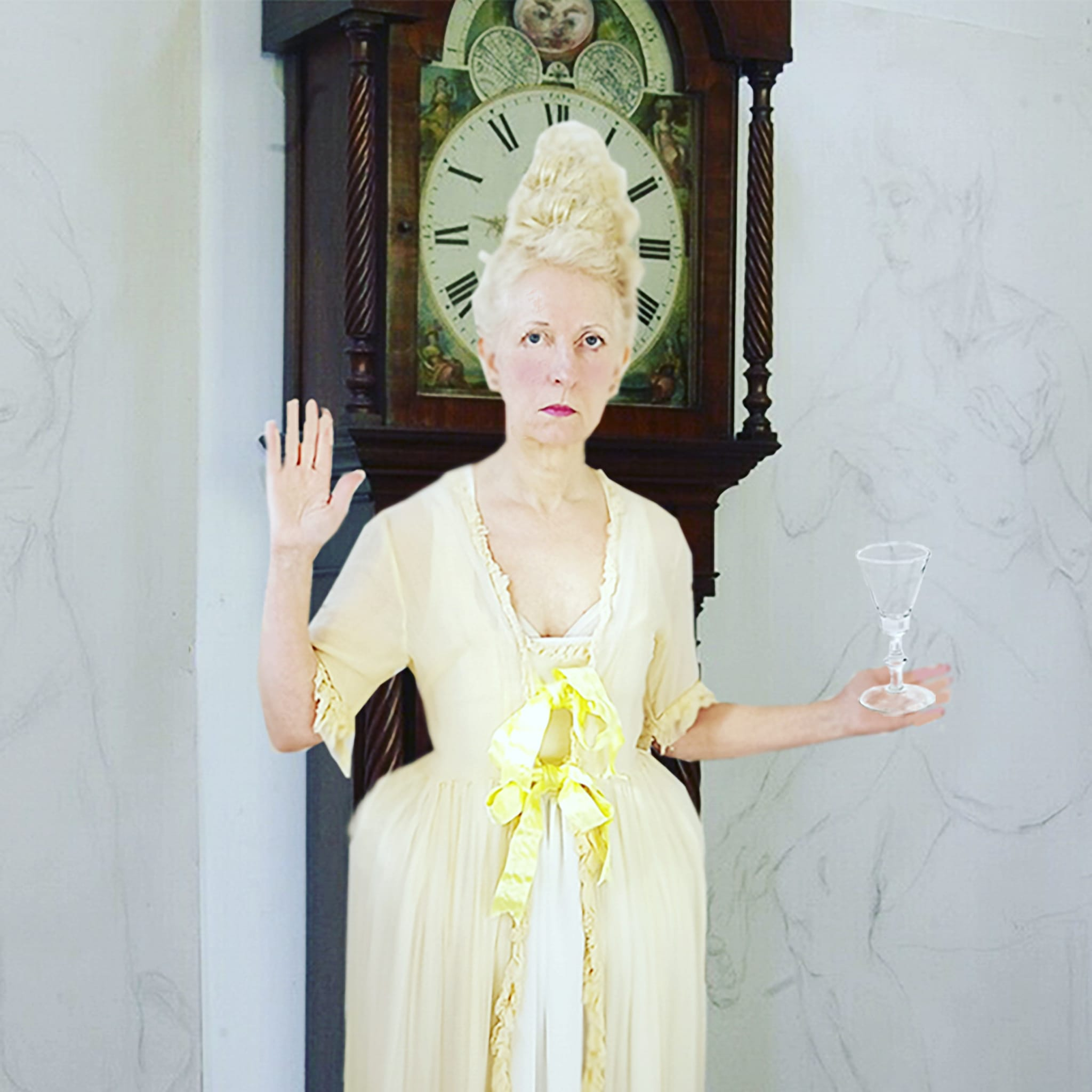

JoWonder, born Joanna Woodward, is a British para-disciplinary artist, known for being an avant-garde stopmotion animator, performance artist, painter, and poet. They are noted for being from a generation of British avant-garde animators such as Brothers Quay and Phil Mulloy.

Their work includes concepts from postmodern literature, the surrealist movement and folklore. Their films, which use collage, puppets, textured painting, and text, provide a counterpoint between the metaphysical and the playful. Lilliputian characters are often introduced to an apocalyptic realm ruled by giants. Jo's work combines: their own literature, religious, political, folklore, and scientific themes using satire and symbolism.

== Animated films ==
In 1990 their animated film The Brooch Pin and the Sinful Clasp using stop frame animation, and featuring performance artist Rose English, won the Grand Prize at Zagreb World Festival of Animated Film, the Direction Award for best first animated film at the British Animation Awards and the Time Out Film Award. It was also a part of Between Imagination and Reality, a programme of film and video selected by Tilda Swinton.

== Video installation ==
In 2007, their video installation Flatlanders, expressing a judgement of the scale of ambition of science at CERN, was featured in Guildford Cathedral in connection with a science debate organised by Surrey University called Is science the new religion? attended by Jim Al-Khalili and Dr Brian Cox. The subject was based around the nuclear experiment at the European Organization for Nuclear Research (CERN).

One of their ongoing projects is 6 Days Goodbye Poems Of Ophelia, research funded by The Wellcome Trust and with a microbiology input by Dr Simon Park of Surrey University. Under The Microscope is an interpretation of Ophelia painted out of bacteria that incorporates messages to Ophelia from the public as part of the soundscape.

== Performances ==
Their avant-garde performance art has included working within the experimental Washroom Collective, which typically involves improvisation and audience interaction.

- 2012, May,JoWonder and the Psychic Tea Leaves, a site-specific 45-minute performance in the tradition of a Victorian seance, using the supernatural as subject performed at the belfry of St Johns on Bethnal Green, part of First Thursdays organised by Whitechapel Art Gallery.
- 2019, September, The Woven Plait of Beatrice a part of a site-specific event The Woven with seven multidisciplinary artists and musicians inspired by the unique heritage of St Leonard's, Shoreditch. 2020 further developed as an experimental performance video.
- 2023, site-specific piece as a part of 'L'Age d'Or', a contemporary surrealist group exhibition, curated by Iranian born Baharak Dehghan, to celebrate the film L'Age d'Or directed by Luis Buñuel in collaboration with Salvador Dali The film explores themes such as: humanization, destruction, confusion, passion, fear, oppression and isolation. JoWonder’s performance took place over the weekend of the coronation of Charles III in the Uk; incorporating a mock coronation of Street Artist Rolling Fool, dressed in a monkey costume. The exhibition brought together forty international artists to reflect on the question: What would Buñuel’s L'Age d'Or look like today?

== Filmography ==
- 1980 The Grid starring Peter Murphy (musician). A New Contemporaries Prize Winner 1981, painting shown the same year.
- 1985 The Hump Back Angel
- 1989 The Brooch Pin and the Sinful Clasp (short) - NFTS. Live action and stop frame puppet animation: with performance artist Rose English
- 1992 Sawdust for Brains and the Key of Wisdom (short) - Channel 4 Television
- « Surrealist Poems About Clocks», Sulfur Editions, Nov. 2024

== Media appearances ==
- State of the Art - Channel 4, 1993

== Selected exhibitions ==
- 2025, a part of “EXI” art exhibition title short for existentialism London, UK. https://www.artrabbit.com/events/exi-show
- 2024, a part of L’age D’ore Event Barcelona, Spain, curated Baharak Dehghan based on the film L'Age d'Or https://lagedorevent.com/barcelona/
- 2023, her paintings were a part of L'Age d'Or, a contemporary surrealist group exhibition, curated Baharak Dehghan. The paintings included a depiction of Liz Truss being abducted by fairies*, and Xi Jinping having breakfast with his dog. The exhibition celebrated the surrealist film: L'Age d'Or directed by Luis Buñuel in collaboration with Salvador Dalí. The L'Age d'Or exhibition and event took place at the Crypt Gallery St Pancras New Church,
- 2023 London Biennale a painting of *Liz Truss being abducted by fairies* 'Abduction of the Sleeping Prime Minister.'
- 2020 - Dear Christine a group touring exhibition funded by Arts Council England (a Tribute to Christine Keeler), her work being a painting of *Christine Keeler as an innocent in a Garden of Earthly Delights occupied by politicians /> Arthouse 1, London
- 2019 - Dear Christine (a Tribute to Christine Keeler), Elysium Gallery, Swansea, UK

== Poetry ==
2025, featured in the Riveraine Muse, a half-yearly magazine of Literature, Arts and Culture. Editor Debasish Lahiri, https://theriverainemuse.com/ 2025- The Clockwisecat, Issue 44. Editor Alison Ross.https://clockwisecat.com/2025/02/issue-44-clockwise-mat-riarchy/

2024, Surrealist Poems About Clocks, Published by Sulfur Editions, with 72 pages of poetry and 16 illustrations.
