= Maximalist film =

Genre of cinema

Maximalist film or maximalist cinema is related to the art and philosophy of maximalism.

== Background ==
In the arts, maximalism, a reaction against minimalism, is an aesthetic of excess. The philosophy can be summarized as "more is more", contrasting with the minimalist motto "less is more".

== Notable filmmakers ==
Many directors have been described as maximalists:

- King Hu
- Shaw Brothers
- Coralie Fargeat
- Daniels
- Ringo Lam
- Bill Gunn
- Tarsem Singh
- Tyler Perry
- Michael Bay
- Zack Snyder
- Julie Taymor
- Emerald Fennell
- Sofia Coppola
- Tony Scott
- Ridley Scott
- Paul W. S. Anderson
- Terry Gilliam
- Paul Verhoeven
- Federico Fellini
- Paolo Sorrentino
- Pedro Almodovar
- Edgar Wright
- Sam Raimi
- King Vidor
- Oliver Stone
- Steven Spielberg
- Alejandro G. Inarritu
- Quentin Tarantino
- S. S. Rajamouli
- Youssef Chahine
- Josef von Sternberg
- Max Ophüls
- Orson Welles
- Christopher Nolan
- Rainer Werner Fassbinder
- Tim Burton
- Guy Maddin
- The team of Michael Powell and Emeric Pressburger
- John Woo
- Genndy Tartakovsky (Hotel Transylvania)
- Masaaki Yuasa
- Xavier Dolan
- Francis Ford Coppola
- Martin Scorsese
- Sergio Leone
- Paul Thomas Anderson
- John Cassavetes
- Baz Luhrmann
- Danny Boyle
- Guy Ritchie
- James Cameron
- Joachim Trier
- Park Chan-wook
- Gaspar Noé
- Arturo and Roy Ambriz

== List of notable maximalist films ==
=== 20th century ===
- Intolerance (D.W. Griffith, 1916)
- Metropolis (Fritz Lang, 1927)
- Napoleon (Abel Gance, 1927)
- Fantasia (James Algar, 1940)
- Wild Flower (Emilio Fernández, 1943)
- The Greatest Show on Earth (Cecil B. DeMille, 1952)
- Singin' in the Rain (Gene Kelly and Stanley Donen, 1952)
- Lola Montes (Max Ophuls, 1955)
- Artists & Models (Frank Tashlin, 1956)
- Mother India (Mehboob Khan, 1957)
- The Flicker (Tony Conrad, 1965)
- Daisies (Vera Chytilova, 1966)
- War and Peace (Sergei Bondarchuk, 1966)
- Point Blank (John Boorman, 1967)
- Weekend (Jean-Luc Goddard, 1967)
- Fellini Satyricon (Federico Fellini, 1969)
- Z (Costa-Gavras, 1969)
- The Music Lovers (Ken Russel, 1970)
- Valerie and Her Week of Wonders (Jaromil Jireš, 1970)
- Tom, Tom, the Piper's Son (Ken Jacobs, 1970)
- Salomè (Carmelo Bene, 1972)
- The Holy Mountain (Alejandro Jodorowsky, 1973)
- Zardoz (John Boorman, 1974)
- New York, New York (Martin Scorsese, 1977)
- Sorcerer (William Friedkin, 1977)
- Piranha (Joe Dante, 1978)
- Apocalypse Now (Francis Ford Coppola, 1979)
- The Blues Brothers (John Landis, 1980)
- Xanadu (Robert Greenwald, 1980)
- The Apple (Menahem Golan, 1980)
- American Pop (Ralph Bakshi, 1981)
- Escape from New York (John Carpenter, 1981)
- Excalibur (John Boorman, 1981)
- Amadeus (Miloš Forman, 1984)
- The Color Purple (Steven Spielberg, 1985)
- Brazil (Terry Gilliam, 1985)
- On the Silver Globe (Andrzej Żuławski, 1988)
- Batman (Tim Burton, 1989)
- Goodfellas (Martin Scorsese, 1990)
- Total Recall (Paul Verhoeven, 1990)
- Prospero's Books (Peter Greenaway, 1991)
- Tribulation 99 (Craig Baldwin, 1991)
- Bram Stoker's Dracula (Francis Ford Coppola, 1992)
- The Heroic Trio (Johnnie To, 1993)
- Shadowlands (Richard Attenborough, 1993)
- Robot in the Family (Jack Shaol, 1994)
- The Cremaster Cycle (Matthew Barney, 1994-2002)
- Casino (Martin Scorsese, 1995)
- To Wong Foo, Thanks for Everything! Julie Newmar (Beeban Kidron, 1995)
- Waterworld (Kevin Reynolds, 1995)
- The Rock (Michael Bay, 1996)
- Romeo + Juliet (Baz Luhrmann, 1996)
- Con Air (Simon West, 1997)
- Titanic (James Cameron, 1997)
- Face/Off (John Woo, 1997)
- Armageddon (Michael Bay, 1998)
- Magnolia (Paul Thomas Anderson, 1999)
- Titus (Julie Taymor, 1999)

=== 21st century ===
- Bamboozled (Spike Lee, 2000)
- Charlie's Angels (McG, 2000)
- Moulin Rouge! (Baz Luhrmann, 2001)
- Punch-Drunk Love (Paul Thomas Anderson, 2002)
- The Matrix Reloaded (The Wachowskis, 2003)
- The Matrix Revolutions (The Wachowskis, 2003)
- The Day After Tomorrow (Roland Emmerich, 2004)
- Man on Fire (Tony Scott, 2004)
- The Polar Express (Robert Zemeckis, 2004)
- Southland Tales ( Richard Kelly, 2006)
- Speed Racer (The Wachowskis, 2008)
- A Town Called Panic (Stéphane Aubier and Vincent Patar, 2009)
- Avatar (James Cameron, 2009)
- The Imaginarium of Dr. Parnassus (Terry Gilliam, 2009)
- Watchmen (Zack Snyder, 2009)
- Zombieland (Ruben Fleischer, 2009)
- The Adventures of Tintin (Steven Spielberg, 2011)
- Transformers: Dark of the Moon (Michael Bay, 2011)
- The Great Gatsby (Baz Luhrmann, 2013)
- Hard to Be a God (Aleksei German, 2013)
- Blue Is the Warmest Colour (Abdellatif Kechiche, 2013)
- Birdman or (The Unexpected Virtue of Ignorance) (Alejandro G. Inarritu, 2014)
- Mommy (Xavier Dolan, 2014)
- X-Men: Days of Future Past (Bryan Singer, 2014)
- De Palma (Noah Baumbach and Jake Paltrow, 2015)
- Mad Max: Fury Road (George Miller, 2015)
- Mother! (Darren Aronofsky, 2017)
- American Made (Doug Liman, 2017)
- I, Tonya (Craig Gillespie, 2017)
- Mission: Impossible - Fallout (Christopher McQuarrie, 2018)
- Spider-Man: Into the Spider-Verse (Bob Persichetti, Peter Ramsey & Rodney Rothman, 2018)
- Suspiria (Luca Guadagnino, 2018)
- Fahrenheit 11/9 (Michael Moore, 2018)
- The Lighthouse (Robert Eggers, 2019)
- The Croods: A New Age (Joel Crawford, 2020)
- Da 5 Bloods (Spike Lee, 2020)
- Tenet (Christopher Nolan, 2020)
- Army of the Dead (Zack Snyder, 2021)
- Belle (Mamoru Hosoda, 2021)
- Encanto (Byron Howard and Jared Bush, 2021)
- House of Gucci (Ridley Scott, 2021)
- In the Heights (Jon M. Chu, 2021)
- Jungle Cruise (Jaume Collet-Serra, 2021)
- The Last Duel (Ridley Scott, 2021)
- The Mitchells vs. the Machines (Mike Rianda, 2021)
- Avatar: The Way of Water (James Cameron, 2022)
- Babylon (Damien Chazelle, 2022)
- Blonde (Andrew Dominik, 2022)
- Elvis (Baz Luhrmann, 2022)
- Everything Everywhere All at Once (Daniels, 2022)
- Moonage Daydream (Brett Morgen, 2022)
- RRR (S. S. Rajamouli, 2022)
- Top Gun: Maverick (Joseph Kosinski, 2022)
- The Unbearable Weight of Massive Talent (Tom Gormican, 2022)
- White Noise (Noah Baumbach, 2022)
- Barbie (Greta Gerwig, 2023)
- Beau is Afraid (Ari Aster, 2023)
- The Boy and the Heron (Hayao Miyazaki, 2023)
- Poor Things (Yorgos Lanthimos, 2023)
- Renaissance: A Film by Beyoncé (Beyoncé, 2023)
- Saltburn (Emerald Fennell, 2023)
- Spider-Man: Across the Spider-Verse (Joaquim Dos Santos, Kemp Powers & Justin K. Thompson, 2023)
- The Sweet East (Sean Price Williams, 2023)
- Abigail (Matt Bettinelli-Olpin and Tyler Gillett, 2024)
- The Brutalist (Brady Corbet, 2024)
- Emilia Pérez (Jacques Audiard, 2024)
- The Substance (Coralie Fargeat, 2024)
- The Fall Guy (David Leitch, 2024)
- MaXXXine (Ti West, 2024)
- Megalopolis (Francis Ford Coppola, 2024)
- Dracula (Radu Jude, 2025)
- I Am Frankelda (Arturo and Roy Ambriz, 2025)
- Primetime (Lance Oppenheim, 2026)
- Wuthering Heights (Emerald Fennell, 2026)

== See also ==
- Arthouse animation
- Vulgar auteurism
- Postmodernist film
- Minimalist film
- Art film
- Arthouse action film
- Modernist film
- Arthouse musical
- American independent cinema
