= Kōji Yamamura =

Japanese independent animator (born 1964)

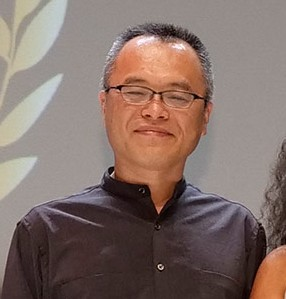
- Yamamura at the 2019 Annecy International Animated Film Festival
- Born: June 4, 1964 (age 62); Nagoya, Japan
- Occupation: Animation
- Notable work: Kafuka: Inaka Isha (animation)

Kōji Yamamura (山村 浩二, Yamamura Kōji; born June 4, 1964) is a Japanese independent animator who, after leaving a career as a background artist at an animation studio, directs, writes, edits, animates, creates the model sheets and background art for and sometimes produces his own short films and has worked on many commissions such as music videos, television advertisements, title sequences and station idents, both on his own and under or with other directors. He is also a regular illustrator of children's literature and textbooks.

His animation spans a variety of media, his earliest independent works mixing clay painting and stop motion with cels, but has latterly come to concentrate on traditional animation. Two of his most famous and acclaimed films are the Academy Award for Best Animated Short Film-nominated and Cristal d'Annecy–winning Mt. Head and the Ottawa Grand Prize and Ōfuji Noburō Award–winning A Country Doctor. His 2011 short film Muybridge's Strings was one of five animated shorts nominated for the Genie Award for Best Animated Short Film at the 32nd Genie Awards in 2012.

== Biography ==
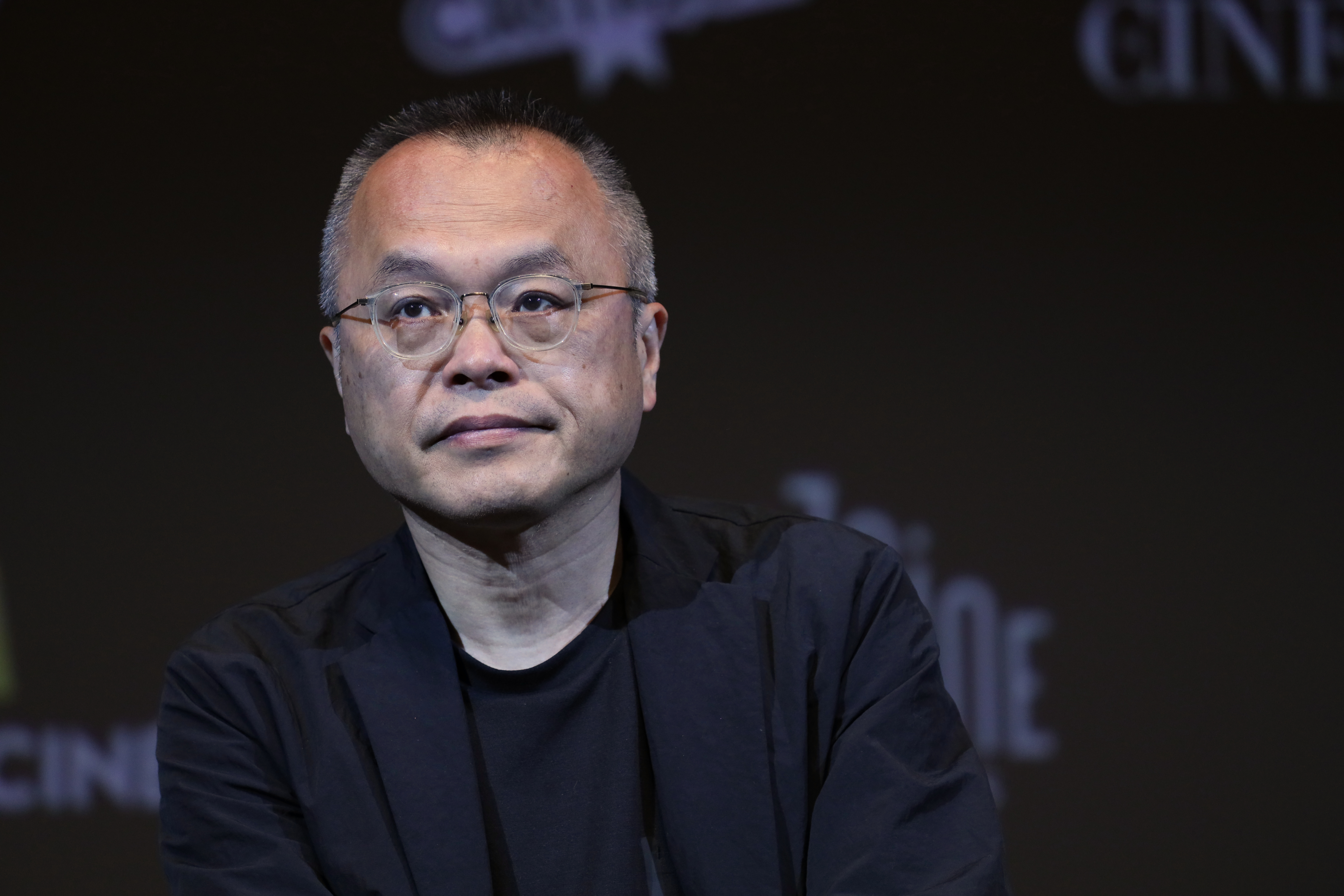
Yamamura at the 2024 Cannes Film Festival

Yamamura was born in Nagoya and studied painting at Tokyo Zokei University. His 2002 movie Mt. Head (Atama Yama) won the short film award for the Annecy International Animated Film Festival, the Grand Prize at the 2004 World Festival of Animated Films - Animafest Zagreb and was nominated for the Academy Award for Animated Short Film. Yamamura won the 2007 Ottawa Grand Prix with his animated adaptation of Franz Kafka's "A Country Doctor." Both of the films were included in the Animation Show of Shows.

Yamamura also held an exhibition at the Aichi Expo 2005.

In 2012, Yamamura received the 30th Kawakita Award. He was awarded the Minister of Education, Culture, Sports, Science and Technology Award for Fine Arts (Media Arts category) in 2018, and received the Medal with Purple Ribbon from the Japanese government in 2019.

== Filmography ==
Year	Title (English)	Title (Original)	Running time
1987	Aquatic	水棲 (Suisei)	5 min.
1989	Japanese-English Pictionary	ひゃっかずかん (Hyakkazukan)	12 min.
1990	Perspektivenbox -Researcher's Search-	遠近法の箱 (Enkinhō no Hako -Hakase no Sagashimono-)	4 min.
1991	The Elevator	ふしぎなエレベーター (Fushigina Erebētā, "Mysterious Elevator")	7 min.
1993	Karo & Piyobupt: A House, The Sandwiches and Imagination	カロとピヨブプト (Karo to Piyobuputo): おうち (O-Uchi), サンドイッチ (Sandoicchi), and あめのひ (Ame no Hi, "Rainy Day")	4 min., 4 min. and 4 min.
1995	Pacusi	パクシ (Pakushi)	18 × 1 min.
1995	Kipling Jr.	キップリングJr. (Kippuringu Jr.)	14 min.
1995	Kid's Castle	キッズキャッスル (Kizzu Kyassuru)	5 min.
1996	Bavel's Book	バベルの本 (Baberu no Hon)	5 min.
1998	Mr. Rib Globe	地球肋骨男 (Chikyū Rokkotsu Otoko)	2 min.
1999	CARP for REMtv	N/A	48 sec.
1999	Your Choice!	どっちにする？ (Docchi ni Suru?, "Which Do You Choose?")	10 min.
2002	Mt. Head	頭山 (Atamayama)	10 min.
2003	Pieces	おまけ (Omake, "Extra" or "Bonus")	2 min.
2003	an unnamed segment for Winter Days	N/A	40 sec.
2005	The Old Crocodile	年をとった鰐 (Toshi o Totta Wani)	13 min.
2006	Fig, a segment for Image Forum Festival 2005's Tokyo Loop	N/A	5 min.
2007	Franz Kafka: Ein Landarzt (A Country Doctor)	カフカ 田舎医者 (Kafuka: Inaka Isha)	21 min.
2007	A Child's Metaphysics	こどもの形而上学 (Kodomo no Keijijōgaku)	5 min.
2011	Muybridge's Strings	マイブリッジの糸 (Maiburijji no Ito)	12 min.
2019	Dreams into Drawing	ゆめみのえ (Yumemi no E)	10 min.
2021	Dozens of Norths	幾多の北 (Ikuta no Kita)	64 min.
2023	My Inner Ear Quartet	耳に棲むもの (Mimi ni Sumumono)	35 min.
