= Krusty Gets Kancelled =

- The Simpsons episode
- The opening scene of Krusty's comeback special, which is based on a scene from Elvis Presley's '68 Comeback Special
- Episode no.: Season 4 Episode 22
- Directed by: David Silverman
- Written by: John Swartzwelder
- Production code: 9F19
- Original air date: May 13, 1993

Guest appearances
- Johnny Carson as himself; Hugh Hefner as himself; Bette Midler as herself; Luke Perry as himself; Elizabeth Taylor as herself; Red Hot Chili Peppers (Flea, Anthony Kiedis, Arik Marshall and Chad Smith) as themselves; Marcia Wallace as Edna Krabappel; Barry White as himself

Episode features
- Chalkboard gag: "I will not charge admission to the bathroom"
- Couch gag: The family steps into a net trap on the way to the couch.
- Commentary: Matt Groening; Al Jean; Mike Reiss; David Silverman

Episode chronology
← Previous "Marge in Chains"	Next → "Homer's Barbershop Quartet"
- The Simpsons season 4

"Krusty Gets Kancelled" is the twenty-second and final episode of the fourth season of the American animated television series The Simpsons, and the 81st episode overall. It first aired on Fox in the United States on May 13, 1993. In the episode, a new show featuring ventriloquist Arthur Crandall and his dummy Gabbo premieres in Springfield and competes with Krusty the Clown's show. Krusty's show is soon canceled. Bart and Lisa decide to help Krusty get back on the air by staging a comeback special.

The episode was written by John Swartzwelder, and directed by David Silverman. Following the success of "Homer at the Bat", the writers wanted to try a similar guest star-heavy episode, except with celebrities instead of baseball players. The episode proved quite difficult, as many of the actors asked to guest star declined at the last minute and the comeback special portion was nearly scrapped. Johnny Carson, Hugh Hefner, Bette Midler, Luke Perry, and the Red Hot Chili Peppers (Flea, Anthony Kiedis, Arik Marshall and Chad Smith) all guest star as themselves and appear on Krusty's special. Elizabeth Taylor and Barry White, both of whom guest-starred in previous episodes this season, make cameo appearances.

== Plot ==
Following a mysterious viral marketing campaign, ventriloquist Arthur Crandall announces that a new program starring his puppet Gabbo will air in direct competition with the established Krusty the Clown Show. At first, Krusty is unimpressed by Gabbo and vows to fight back, but quickly pales to Gabbo's clever tactics and great reviews. Krusty tries to use a dummy of his own, but its grotesque appearance scares off many of the children in the audience. To make matters worse, Itchy and Scratchy move to Gabbo's show. The bizarre Soviet animation segment Krusty begins showing instead causes his ratings to hit rock-bottom; his show is consequently canceled.

Out of work and penniless, Krusty becomes depressed, finding little motivation to do anything. Bart and Lisa, who had disliked Gabbo from the start, decide to try to help Krusty get his career back on track. Bart sneaks into the studio where Gabbo's show is filmed and secretly records Gabbo referring to children of Springfield as "SOBs", which damages his reputation. However, this backfires when Kent Brockman says the same insult at the end of his news program and is subsequently fired; the news of Brockman's firing becomes more widespread than Gabbo's remarks, and Gabbo's reputation remains stable.

After visiting Krusty's home and seeing photos of him with multiple celebrities, including Johnny Carson and Bette Midler, Bart and Lisa suggest that Krusty host a live comeback special. They begin recruiting Krusty's celebrity friends to appear on the special and help Krusty get back into shape before the special airs. Bart and Lisa manage to hire all of Krusty's celebrity friends, except Elizabeth Taylor, whose agent rejects Bart and Lisa's offer; Taylor initially agrees with her agent, but upon seeing the show on TV, she remarks that she needs to fire him. During the special, Carson juggles a 1987 Buick Skylark while singing an opera number. Krusty's brother Luke Perry is blasted out of a cannon and is hurled through a sandpaper museum and jars of acid at the Kwik-E-Mart before landing in a pillow factory that is immediately demolished. It ends with Krusty and Midler singing Wind Beneath My Wings in a duet.

The special is a great success and Krusty's career gets back on track. A party is held at Moe's Tavern to celebrate the special's success, and Bart toasts Krusty as "the greatest entertainer in the world, except maybe that guy"—referring to Carson, who is playing "Goodnight, Ladies" on an accordion while balancing a bench on his head that Grampa Simpson and Jasper Beardsley are sitting on.

== Production ==
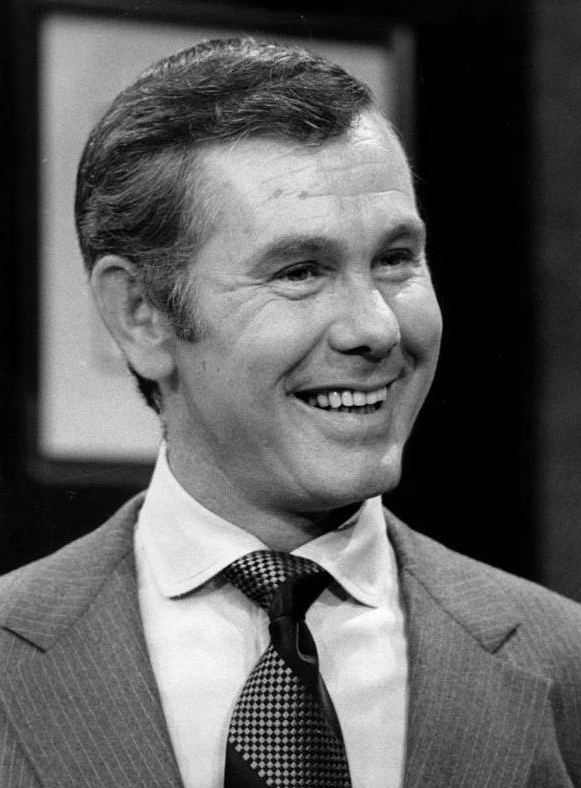
Johnny Carson objected to his original role, which depicted him as a mooch, so the writers instead made him extremely versatile.

The episode was written by John Swartzwelder and directed by David Silverman. The idea of The Krusty the Clown Show being canceled was pitched by Swartzwelder. The rest of the writers decided this would be an opportunity to include a group of celebrity guest stars. They had done a similar episode the year before with "Homer at the Bat", which starred nine Major League Baseball players, and hoped to emulate its success. At that point, the writers had a list of celebrities who had wanted to do a guest spot on the show and decided to use this episode to burn through some of them. However, the production was described by executive producer Mike Reiss as "a nightmare" because several guests pulled out at the last minute and the script had to be revised several times. One of the goals for the episode was to have an ex-President of the United States. They wrote "very respectful but cute" parts for each then-living ex-president (Richard Nixon, Gerald Ford, Jimmy Carter, and Ronald Reagan) at the time, but they all turned them down. Only Reagan responded, sending a politely worded reply.

All of the guest stars were recorded over a period of several months. One of the writers' goals was to get a musical act to appear, but several performers, including the Rolling Stones and Wynonna Judd, turned the role down (although Rolling Stones members Keith Richards and Mick Jagger did eventually appear in season 14's "How I Spent My Strummer Vacation"). The Red Hot Chili Peppers finally accepted, and were directed by George Meyer, who told them to ad-lib many of their lines. The celebrity aspect of the episode was almost canceled because the producers were unable to get an obligation before the record deadline. Johnny Carson appears in the episode, and it was one of the few televised appearances he made after he retired from The Tonight Show. He recorded his lines the night after the 44th Primetime Emmy Awards. The original role pitched for Carson was one where he visited the Simpson family's house and mooched off them. Carson felt this role was too degrading, so instead the writers took the opposite route and portrayed him as extremely versatile and multi-talented. Bette Midler's condition for guest-starring was that the show promoted her anti-littering campaign. Elizabeth Taylor guest-starred as herself and also recorded a part as Maggie in "Lisa's First Word" on the same day. Luke Perry was one of the first guest stars to agree to their parts.

The short cartoon "Worker and Parasite" is a reference to Soviet cartoons, and Soviet propaganda venerating the working class against those considered a drain on society. To produce the animation, Silverman xeroxed several drawings and made the animation very jerky. The scene where Krusty sings "Send in the Clowns" was very tricky for the animators because it involves two shots of the same scene from different angles. Parts of the scene were animated by Brad Bird.

As of 2025, this episode is well-known for being the only one where Marge, despite her prominence, has no lines of dialogue. It is also the first episode where a Simpson family member, besides Maggie, does not speak.

== Cultural references ==
"Worker and Parasite", a reference to Eastern European animation, is one of Matt Groening's favorite moments from The Simpsons. According to David Silverman, the character design was based on Dušan Vukotić's Oscar-winning 1961 animated film Surogat.

Mr. Burns misreads a billboard reading "Gabbo is coming", telling Smithers, "Garbo is coming!" Gabbo's name is from Erich von Stroheim's The Great Gabbo (1929). He was originally designed to be more square, but the second design was made to be "a demented Howdy Doody". His voice was based on Jerry Lewis. His musical number contains several references to "I've Got No Strings" from Pinocchio (1940) and a brief imitation of sports commentator Vin Scully. Gabbo's on-air gaffe is based on a widespread urban legend claiming that the host of a children's radio or television program, often identified as Uncle Don, made a derogatory comment about the child audience at the end of a show without realizing that he was still on the air. Krusty's riddle, "Why is a raven like a writing desk?", is from Alice's Adventures in Wonderland (1865). He mentions that he beat Joey Bishop, whose The Joey Bishop Show ran opposite The Tonight Show Starring Johnny Carson. Bette Midler's serenading Krusty with "Wind Beneath My Wings" is a reference to her singing to Johnny Carson on the penultimate episode of his show. Krusty's cover of "Send in the Clowns" has the altered lyrics of Frank Sinatra's rendition from Ol' Blue Eyes Is Back. The scene where Krusty asks the Red Hot Chili Peppers to change the lyrics to "Give It Away" is a reference to Ed Sullivan asking The Doors to change the lyrics to "Light My Fire" for their performance on his show. The poses of the band members in the scene are based on the movie The Doors (1991). Flea, the band's bassist, is incongruously seen playing a guitar during the performance of "Give It Away". Several scenes in Krusty's special are based on Elvis Presley's '68 Comeback Special. Hefner plays a theme from Sergei Prokofiev's Peter and the Wolf on wine glasses. Carson balances a Buick Skylark over his head while singing the Habanera aria from Georges Bizet's opera Carmen (1875). At the end of the episode, he plays "Goodnight, Ladies" on the accordion, which segues into The Simpsons theme.

== Reception ==
In its original broadcast, "Krusty Gets Kancelled" finished 24th in ratings for the week of May 10–16, 1993, with a Nielsen rating of 12.3, equivalent to approximately 11.5 million viewing households. It was the highest-rated show on the Fox network that week, beating Married... with Children.

In 1997, TV Guide named "Krusty Gets Kancelled" as the second greatest Simpsons episode and the 66th greatest TV episode. In 1998, TV Guide listed it in its list of top twelve episodes, stating "Simpsons fans get a star-packed keeper that in its own twisted way reflects the pure faith and goodness at the heart of every classic children's tale." In 2006, Bette Midler, Hugh Hefner, Johnny Carson, Luke Perry, and the Red Hot Chili Peppers were listed at number four on IGN's list of the best Simpsons guest stars. They all also appeared on AOL's list of their favorite 25 Simpsons guest stars. In 2007, Vanity Fair named "Krusty Gets Kancelled" as the ninth-best episode of The Simpsons. John Ortved felt, "This is Krusty's best episode—better than the reunion with his father, or the Bar Mitzvah episode, which won an Emmy much later on. The incorporation of guest stars as themselves is top-notch, and we get to see the really dark side of Krusty's flailing showbiz career. Hollywood, television, celebrities, and fans are all beautifully skewered here." Brien Murphy of the Abilene Reporter-News classed "Krusty Gets Kancelled" as one of his three favorite episodes of The Simpsons, along with "Behind the Laughter" and "The Simpsons Spin-Off Showcase". Though Jim Schembri of The Age put the episode among his top 10 episodes of the series, he also noted "Unfortunately, this signaled the beginning of the show's obsession with star cameos." An article in the Herald Sun placed "Krusty Gets Kancelled" among the top 20 episodes of The Simpsons, and characterized "The sight of Krusty's feeble attempt to fight back with his own gruesome ventriloquist doll, which falls apart on his lap on air" as the highlight of the episode. In 2009, it was named the 24th Greatest TV Episode of All-Time. The episode is one of co-executive producer Tim Long's three favorites, including "The Itchy & Scratchy & Poochie Show" and "A Milhouse Divided".

In an article about the 2003 DVD release in The Independent, "Krusty Gets Kancelled" was highlighted along with episodes "When You Dish Upon a Star", "Lisa the Iconoclast", "Dog of Death", "Homer Badman", and "Grampa vs. Sexual Inadequacy". In a 2004 review of the release of The Simpsons season four on DVD, Andrew Pulver of The Guardian highlighted episodes "Kamp Krusty" and "Krusty Gets Kancelled" as part of "TV art at its peak". Mike Clark of USA Today also highlighted "Kamp Krusty" and "Krusty Gets Kancelled" as among the better episodes of the season, along with "A Streetcar Named Marge" and "Lisa the Beauty Queen". Jen Chaney of The Washington Post described episodes "A Streetcar Named Marge", "Mr. Plow", "Marge vs. the Monorail", and "Krusty Gets Kancelled" as "gems" of The Simpsons' fourth season. Spence Kettlewell of The Toronto Star described season 4 episodes "Krusty Gets Kancelled", "Kamp Krusty", "Mr. Plow", and "I Love Lisa" as "some of the best episodes" of the series. Forrest Hartman of the Reno Gazette-Journal wrote that the large number of celebrity appearances detracted from the episode, commenting: "The result is a boring hodgepodge of scenes with Bette Midler, Johnny Carson, the Red Hot Chili Peppers and more where we're supposed to laugh simply because famous people are interacting with Krusty." Nathan Rabin writes that "At its weakest, 'Krusty Gets Kancelled' feels like a show tailored specifically for the massive egos of its guest stars. In that respect, it’s an unfortunate harbinger of the show’s celebrity and guest-star-fixated future... in its second half, 'Krusty Gets Kancelled' becomes more about celebrities than satire; the story sometimes seems to serve the celebrity cameos rather than the other way around." None the less, he praises the way Springfield's excitement over Gabbo, before they know who (or what) Gabbo is, showcases the town's mob mentality, as exemplified by Homer's line “He’ll tell us what to do!” Rabin writes that it "is still a worthy finale to a spectacular season. After all it accomplished in its fourth season, The Simpsons deserved a victory lap or two, so it can be forgiven for flattering some of the mega-stars it lured into its dazzling orbit."

In 2000, the episode was released as part of a Twentieth Century Fox boxed set The Simpsons Go Hollywood, commemorating The Simpsons' 10th anniversary. The set included "some of the series' best spoofs of movies and TV", and also included episodes "Marge vs. the Monorail", "A Streetcar Named Marge", "Who Shot Mr. Burns?", parts one and two, and "Bart Gets Famous". The episode was included in a 2003 release of The Simpsons Classics on DVD by 20th Century Fox Home Entertainment.
