= Nedeljko Dragić =

Croatian director, author of cartoons, caricatures, comics and numerous illustrations

- Born: 13 September 1936 (age 88); Paklenica, Novska, Kingdom of Yugoslavia
- Occupation(s): Film director, animator

Nedeljko Dragić (born 13 September 1936) is a Croatian director, animator, cartoonist and illustrator. Since 1953 he has been a cartoonist and had exhibitions and published a book called Lexicon for Illiterate People in 1966. In 1960 he began working as a designer and animator at Zagreb Film, contributing to the works of N. Kostelac, I. Vrbanić, B. Dovniković and others. Since 1965 he has owned the rights to the movie Elegy and has become one of the most important representatives of the Zagreb School of Animation.

== Career ==
His works rank among the most original among world animation. He is the creator of the award-winning films Tamer of Wild Horses (1966), Perhaps Diogenes (1968), The Days Are Going (1969), Tup Tup (1972), The Diary (1974), Put k susjedu (1982), Pictures of Memories (1989) and others, as well as a series of short films (Per aspera ad astra, Striptiz, 1969), of which he was the scriptwriter, cartoonist and animator. He developed a distinctive visual style in which animation grows from the caricatures with pronounced symbolic elements, and linking art and poetic elements usually varies the theme of the absurdity of man's fate in modern civilization. His films have been awarded at international festivals in Annecy, Oberhausen, Zagreb and elsewhere, and Tup Tup received an Academy Award nomination in early 1973. He adapted several films by other authors (e.g., The Man Who Had To Sing, 1971, M. Blažeković, author of the comic book series Dopey and book illustrator). Since the beginning of the 1990s he has lived and worked in Germany. He was given the Vladimir Nazor Award for Lifetime Achievement in 2013.
