= Fisheye (1980 film) =

Fisheye (Croatian: Riblje oko) is a 1980 animated short film by Joško Marušić for Zagreb Film. The film is a part of the National Film Collection, preserved by the Croatian State Archives.

== Synopsis and development ==
Fisheye depicts a natural reverse in which fish-like monsters invade a bleak coastal village, capturing and killing all of the inhabitants (women and children) through clubbing or maiming, after the fishermen leave for their daily catch. The visuals are executed with a woodcut-like quality, with a score by Ivica Simović utilizing a twelve-tone technique consisting of seven cellos.

== Reception ==
Stanislav Matacic, writing for International Psychoanalytical Association, describes it as a horror film using a unique art style and a Hitchcock-like soundtrack, praising it as a timeless piece of art. Dan Piepenbring, writing for The Paris Review, described it as an inspiring blend of macabre and mundane. It won the award for Best Short Film Director at Sitges Film Festival in 1980.
