= Samac (1958 film) =

1958 animated film

Samac (English: Loner) is a 1958 animated short directed by Vatroslav Mimica for Zagreb Film. The short won the studio's first international prize at Venice Film Festival. The short is described as a "mordant, yet moving depiction of a clerk fighting a losing battle with the machine age".
