= Muybridge's Strings =

- Film poster
- Japanese: マイブリッジの糸
- Directed by: Kōji Yamamura
- Written by: Kōji Yamamura
- Produced by: Keisuke Tsuchihashi; Michael Fukushima; Shuzo John Shiota
- Edited by: Kōji Yamamura
- Music by: Normand Roger; Pierre Yves Drapeau; Denis Chartrand
- Animation by: Kōji Yamamura
- Production companies: National Film Board of Canada; NHK
- Distributed by: Polygon Pictures
- Release date: September 17, 2011
- Running time: 13 minutes
- Countries: Canada; Japan

Muybridge's Strings (Japanese: マイブリッジの糸; Maiburijji no ito) is a Canadian-Japanese animated short film, directed by Kōji Yamamura and released in 2011. A meditation on the passage of time, the film contrasts the story of Eadweard Muybridge, the British photographer who was a key innovator in the concept of photographically recording motion, with the story of a contemporary mother in Tokyo who realizes that her daughter is growing up and slipping away from her.

The film won the Excellence Prize at the 2011 Japan Media Arts Festival, and a special prize at the 2012 Hiroshima International Animation Festival. It received a Genie Award nomination for Best Animated Short Film at the 32nd Genie Awards in 2012.
