= Puparia =

2020 Japanese animated short film

- Release poster
- Directed by: Shingo Tamagawa
- Music by: Steve Reich
- Release date: November 20, 2020
- Running time: 3 minutes

Puparia (stylized in all caps) is a 2020 Japanese animated fantasy short film directed by Shingo Tamagawa.

== Plot ==
The film does not have a linear plot. The film itself consists of several sketches, drawn in pencil technique, which are united by a common feeling, which the author himself described as "Something is about to change drastically. We can only be witnesses to it".

== Production ==
Shingo Tamagawa created the anime by himself, which took him three years. Prior to that, he worked as an animator on projects such as Mobile Suit Gundam: Hathaway, Code Geass: Akito the Exiled, and Mobile Suit Gundam Narrative. In a documentary about his work, he emphasized that the film was preceded by frustration over his career as an animator and the long career break that followed; in the same documentary, he also emphasizes that the feeling that "...the values shaping our world were gradually fading away" also played an important role in the decision to create this film.

== Reception ==
The anime was well received by both viewers and critics.

On Comic Book Resources, Gregory Segal said that "Puparia is a wonderfully crafted piece of animation that is filled with rich landscapes, expressive characters, and eloquent symbolism. While its meaning is unclear and highly interpretive, this in no way distracts from the viewing experience. The short is intended to be watched again and again, and mulled over on even more occasions".

== Awards ==
Anime was shown at the New Chitose Airport International Animation Festival 2020 and won Sapporo Breweries Award.
