= Maureen Furniss =

Maureen Ruth Furniss is a writer, animation historian, animation theorist, critic, professor, and president of the Society for Animation Studies. Furniss served as a professor at the California Institute of Arts, Savannah College of Art and Design, University of Southern California, and Chapman University.

== Biography ==
Furniss attended San Diego State University, studied "Telecommunications and Film," received a bachelor's degree in 1983 and a master's degree in 1987. In 1994 she received a Doctor of Philosophy (Ph.D.) from University of Southern California in 1994 using the dissertation "Things of the Spirit: A Study of Abstract Film."

She is the founding editor of Animation Journal, a peer-reviewed scholarly journal about animation.

Furniss contributed to the Encarta article about Chuck Jones.

== Works ==
- Chuck Jones: Conversations - Contains many interviews related to Chuck Jones
- Art in Motion: Animation Aesthetics
- The Animation Bible: A Practical Guide to the Art of Animating from Flipbooks to Flash
- Things of the Spirit: A Study of Abstract Animation
