= Don Kihot (film) =

1961 animated short film by Vlado Kristl

- Poster
- Directed by: Vlado Kristl
- Music by: Milko Kelemen
- Color process: Eastmancolor
- Production company: Zagreb Film
- Release date: 1961
- Running time: 10 minutes
- Country: SFR Yugoslavia
- Language: none

Don Kihot is a 1961 experimental animated short by Vlado Kristl for Zagreb Film. It is loosely based on Don Quixote by Miguel de Cervantes.

== Themes ==
The author reduced the characters in the short to Klee-style ideograms, with backgrounds being represented by abstract frescoes, all of which is accompanied by atonal music.

== Reception and legacy ==
The short was blacklisted during the former Yugoslavia due to its rigid classification of art and society, which Don Kihot challenged. The short won a number of prizes at international festivals, such as the main prize at International Short Film Festival Oberhausen in 1962. It is described as a "difficult but very poetic film" and a magnum opus for Kristl. Speed and Wilsom state that the short "presents the eccentric individualist assailed by all the forces of the modern state - guns, radar, tanks, planes, patrols, armies - and in some amazing way the nonconformist deviationist Don triumphs over them all".
