= Professor Balthazar =

Animated television series

- Professor Balthazar is able to solve all problems by using his magical machine.
- Also known as: Profesor Baltazar
- Genre: Animated television series
- Created by: Zlatko Grgić
- Directed by: Zlatko Grgić; Boris Kolar; Ante Zaninović
- Composer: Tomica Simović
- Country of origin: Yugoslavia (SR Croatia)
- Original language: Croatian (narration)
- No. of series: 4
- No. of episodes: 59

Production
- Running time: 5–10 minutes
- Production companies: Zagreb Film; Windrose Film

Original release
- Release: 1967 – 1978

Professor Balthazar (Croatian: Profesor Baltazar) is a Croatian children's animated television series that aired between 1967 and 1978. It was created by animator Zlatko Grgić. The characters of the series do not speak in any intelligible language, and the plot instead recounted by a narrator in voice-over.

== Plot ==
The series revolves around benevolent genius Professor Balthazar. In each episode, someone in his surroundings has a problem, which he considers and finds a solution to. Professor Balthazar activates a magical machine and produces an invention that will solve the problem.

== History ==
Professor Balthazar was created for television by the Croatian animator Zlatko Grgić at the Zagreb Film studio. Fifty-nine episodes of the cartoon were made between 1967 and 1978. The series has been broadcast subsequently in several countries besides the former Yugoslavia, Denmark, Finland, Germany (Westdeutscher Rundfunk), Iran, Israel, Italy, Norway, Portugal, South Korea, Sweden, United Kingdom and Australia.

Professor Balthazar was praised for the general absence of violence or force as a means of solving problems. The professor himself is depicted as benevolent and pacifistic, always aiming to solve problems through imagination and reason, as well as ensuring that everyone ends up better off.

In 2011, all 59 episodes have been restored by DVDlab, and published on DVD. A new episode was produced in 2019, "Third time lucky", 52 years after the original show premiered.

== Episodes ==
=== Season 1 ===
(Order and titles according to region 2 DVD)

- "The Inventor Of Shoes" – 15 May 1967
- "The Flying Fabian" – 10 October 1968
- "A Windy Story"
- "Maestro Koko" – 10 October 1968
- "Of Mouse And Ben" – 20 June 1969
- "Starlight Serenaders"
- "The Rise And Fall Of Horatio" – 20 June 1969
- "Martin Makes It To The Top" – 20 June 1969
- "Knitting Pretty"
- "Arts And Flowers"
- "Lighthouse Keeping" – 20 June 1969
- "Victor's Egg-O-Matic"
- "Happiness For Two"

=== Season 2 ===
- "Doctor Don't Little" – 31 December 1970
- "The Night Watchman Must Fall" – 31 December 1970
- "Cloud And Clear"
- "Steepless Is Funny"
- "Bald Is Beautiful"
- "Stumble-Bumps"
- "Snow Time For Comedy" – 31 December 1970
- "Bim Bam Bum"
- "The Grave Little Tailor" – 31 December 1970
- "Some Like It Hop"
- "For Heaven's Cake"
- "Some Like It Cold"
- "Somewhat Over The Rainbow"

=== Season 3 ===
(order and titles according to region 2 DVD)

- "Maxol" – 1976
- "Water We Doing" - 1976
- "Hat-On Flier" – 1976
- "Cloudy With Brawlstorms" – 1976
- "Pirates And Lollipops" – 1976
- "Two Bees Or Not Two Bees" – 1 January 1977
- "You're Fired!" – 1 January 1977
- "Big-Saw Puzzle – 1 January 1977
- "Vanilla Monster – 1 January 1977
- "Lion's Share" – 1 January 1977
- "Tenderfeet Centipede" – 1 January 1977
- "Peppino Cicerone" – 1 January 1977
- "Mike On The Bike" – 1 January 1977

=== Season 4 ===
(order and titles according to region 2 DVD)

- "Crazy Times"
- "Heart On Fire"
- "The Sad Little Ghost"
- "Two Top Hats"
- "Dancing Willy Hik"
- "Playing Tag"
- "The Lost Rabbit"
- "Clown Daniel"
- "Abraham The Busy Shoemaker"
- "Opera Star"
- "Axel The Penguin"
- "Business Is Business"
- "Bird"
- "Sporting Life"
- "Champion"
- "Street Musicians"
- "The Great Snoring"
- "The Trials Of Love"
- "Happiness On Wings"
- "An Endless Deviltry"

== Legacy ==
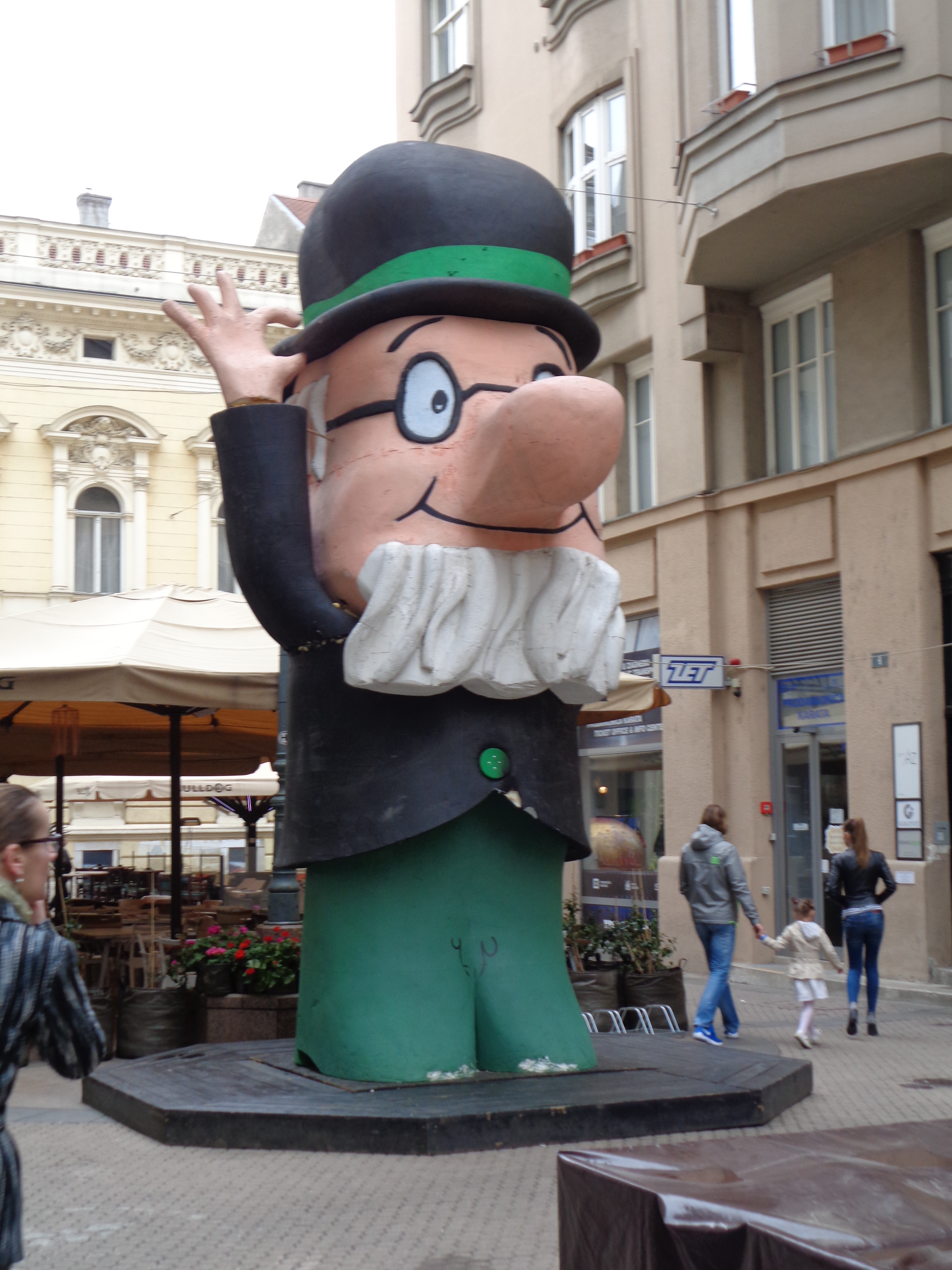
Professor Balthazar statue in Zagreb

In the United States, Professor Balthazar was introduced as an interstitial series on ABC's Curiosity Shop in 1971. A live-action puppet representation of the character, named Baron Balthazar (voiced by Bob Holt), served as the lead-in and narrator to the cartoons, which were specifically mentioned to take place in the Baron's homeland of "downtown Bosnia".

The Nickelodeon variety show, Pinwheel, also aired Professor Balthazar as an interstitial series throughout the 1980s. However this was translated more faithfully to the original Croatian scripts than Curiosity Shop, dubbed with a British narrator rather than Bob Holt.

American animator and creator Craig McCracken called Professor Balthazar 'brilliant', citing it as a significant design influence for his 2013 series Wander Over Yonder.
