= Vlado Kristl =

Croatian artist and filmmaker

Vladimir "Vlado" Kristl (24 January 1923, Zagreb, Croatia – 7 July 2004, Munich, Germany) was a filmmaker and artist, best known for his animations and short films.

== Biography ==
Vladimir "Vlado" Kristl was born 24 January 1923 in Zagreb, Croatia. Kristl first came to international prominence for his formally challenging and rigorous animations, particularly Don Kihot (freely inspired by Cervantes' Don Quixote). The film is a "graphical and abstract masterpiece which went beyond all existing conventions" and was awarded the main prize at the Oberhausen International Short Film Festival. Kristl regarded this film, which was not his first, as the one where he "was finally given a free rein".

In 1962 Kristl made General i resni clovek (The General and the real man), a satirical live action short film which got him into trouble with the board of censors. Following the banning of his early film The General in 1962, Kristl left Croatia and relocated to Germany where he created an incomparable body of work in the context of post-war European cinema. His work has a central position in the avant-garde scene in Zagreb, Yugoslavia, as well as the emergent radical political cinema in Germany in the 1960s influencing participants in the Oberhausen manifesto and the New German Cinema of the 1960s and 70s. In Germany, he created some of the key works of independent cinema in the 1960s, such as Arme Leute and Madeleine, Madeleine, and also began his cycle of uniquely anarchistic feature films.

He died in 2004, aged 81, in Munich, Germany. With his partner Jelena he had two children, Madeleine (b. 1966) and Pepe Stephan (b. 1968).

Neznatna lirika

He published two books of poetry: Neznatna lirika (Insignificant lyrics, 1959), and Pet bijelih stepenica (Five white steps, 1961) in Croatian, and several books in German.

== Filmography ==
- Šagrenska koža (The Piece of Shagreen Leather) – 1960
- Don Kihot – 1961
- General i resni človek/Der General und der Ernste Mensch (The General and the Real Human Being) – 1962 – 12 minutes
- Arme Leute – 1963 – 8 minutes
- Madeleine, Madeleine – 1963 – 11 minutes
- Der Damm (The Dam) – 1964 – 80 minutes
- Autorennen – 1965 – 10 minutes
- Der Brief (The Letter) – 1966 – 83 minutes
- Prometheus – 1966 – 10 minutes
- Die Utopen – 1967 – 9 minutes
- Sekundenfilme – 1968 – 19 minutes
- 100 Blatt Schreibblock – 1968 – 26 minutes
- Italienisches Capricco – 1969 – 30 minutes
- Film oder Macht (Film or Power) – 1970 – 110 minutes
- Obrigkeitsfilm (The Film Of The Authority) – 1971 – 86 minutes
- Literaturverfilmung – 1973 – 10 minutes
- Horizonte – 1973 – 8 minutes
- Kollektivfilm – 1974 – 18 minutes
- Diese Gebichte: Tod Der Hierachie – 1975 – 58 minutes
- Verräter Der Jungen Deutschen Films Schlafen Nicht – 1982 – 6minutes
- Tod der Zuschauer (Death To The Spectator) – 1983 – 110 minutes
- Die Schule Der Postmoderne – 1990 – 15 minutes
- Die Hälfte Des Reichtums Für Die Hälfte Der Schönheit – 1994 – 9 minutes
- Als Man Noch Aus Persönlichen Gründen Gelebt Hat – 1996 – 6 minutes
- Der Letzte Klon – 1998 – 6 minutes
- Drei Faule Schweine – 2000 – 7 minutes
- Kunst Ist Nur Ausserhalb Der Menschengesellschaft – 2002 – 9 minutes
- Weltkongress Der Obdachlosen – 2004 – 5 minutes

Films about Kristl include:

- Vlado Kristl Portrait (directed by Kurt Benning; 2003) – 60 minutes
- Vlado Kristl – Ich bin ein Mensch-Versuch (Vlado Kristl – I am a Human Experiment; directed by Johanna Pauline Maier and Markus Nechleba; 2006) – 87 minutes

== Publications in German ==
- Geschäfte, die es nicht gibt, Ed. Längsfeld, München 1966
- Komödien, Kinema Verlag, Berlin 1968
- Mundmaschine, UnVERLAG, München 1969
- Vorworte (Zeitschrift für unbrauchbare Texte) 8 Nummern c/o Barbara Schlottke, München 1970/71
- Sekundenfilme, Edition Suhrkamp Verlag (Wegen schlechtem Verkaufs barbarisch eingestampft vom selb. Verlag), Frankfurt/Main 1971
- Kultur der Anarchie, Kommunales Kino, Frankfurt, 1975
- Unerlaubte Schönheit, Filmkritikheft Nr 233, Mai 1976
- Video-theater, Freunder der Deutschen Kinemathek e.V., Berlin, 1977
- Körper des Unrechts, S.A.U.-Verlag, München 1979
- Hamburg 1980, Verlag Michael Kellner, Hamburg 1980
- Revolution 1941–1980, I. Band 1. und 2. Auflage, Hamburg 1980
- Fremdenheft oder vom Glück unter Eingebildeten zu Sein, Hamburg 1981 (SV)
- Techniken der Kunst machen, Kiel 1981 (SV)
- Titel und Würden, Verlag Michael Kellner, Hamburg 1983
- Zeichnung, 1.-DM Verlag, Hamburg, 1984
- Revolution II. Band, mit Angehängtem I. Band, 1.-DM Verlag, Hamburg, 1984
- Als man noch aus Persönlichen Grunden gelebt hat, 1.-DM Verlag, Hamburg, 1986
- Die Postmoderne, 1.-DM Verlag, Hamburg, 1987
- Die Intelligenz, Haus Höchster Schlossplatz 1 e.V., Höchst, 1990
- Die Sonne, Haus Höchster Schlossplatz 1 e.V., Höchst, 1990
