= Inspektor Maska =

Zagreb Film animated comedy series

- Also known as: Inspector Mask
- Genre: Animated television series
- Created by: Dragutin Vunak
- Based on: Inspektor se vratio kući by Vatroslav Mimica
- Directed by: Boris Kolar; Borivoj Dovniković; Dragutin Vunak various
- Voices of: Mladen Šerment
- Composers: Aleksandar Bubanović; Davor Kajfeš; Miljenko Prohaska; Stipica Kalogjera
- Country of origin: Croatia (Yugoslavia)
- Original language: Hrvatski
- No. of series: 1
- No. of episodes: 13

Production
- Running time: 7–10 minutes
- Production company: ZAGREB FILM d.d.

Original release
- Network: Radiotelevizija Zagreb
- Release: 1962 – 1963

Inspektor Maska (Croatian for 'Inspector Mask') is a Croatian and Yugoslav animated comedy television series produced for television by Zagreb Film that ran from 1962 to 1963.

== Development ==
The idea for the series originated from the 1959 animated short Inspektor se vratio kući, directed by Vatroslav Mimica, which was particularly well received.

== Synopsis ==
The story takes place in an unnamed American metropolis of the 1960s, where a criminal gang led by Prehlađeni Joe (Runny Nose Joe or Sneezy Joe) carries out various criminal acts, but is thwarted by police inspektor Maska, using various disguises to track them and catch them in the end.

== Episode list ==
No.	Year	Episode name (Hrvatski)	Episode name (English)
1	1962	Duh u škripcu	Ghost In A Squeeze
2	1962	Crni sombrero	El Cactusito
3	1962	Kostur postavlja zamku	Skeleton Sets The Tramp
4	1962	Krađa u luci	The 10.000 Ton Robbery
5	1962	Lula Mira	Calumet
6	1962	Oteti konj	The Horsenapping
7	1962	Otmica Miss Universum	Kidnapping Of Miss Universe
8	1962	Sto jedna (101) žena Toni Kantare	Tony's 101 Bride
9	1962	Šeikov briljant	Sheikh's Jewel
10	1962	Građanin IM-5	Citizen IM-5
11	1963	Obračun u Muzeju voštanih figura	Headsman Of The Wax Museum
12	1963	Ole, Torero!	Ole, Torero!
13	1963	Električna stolica je nestala	The Runaway Electric Chair
