= A Country Doctor (film) =

- Directed by: Kōji Yamamura
- Written by: Kōji Yamamura
- Starring: Sensaku Shigeyama
- Cinematography: Kōji Yamamura
- Edited by: Kōji Yamamura
- Music by: Hitomi Shimizu
- Distributed by: Shōchiku
- Release dates: September 21, 2007 (Ottawa International Animation Festival); November 17, 2007 (Japan)
- Running time: 21 minutes
- Country: Japan
- Language: Japanese

Franz Kafka's A Country Doctor (カフカ 田舎医者, Kafuka: Inaka Isha; German: Franz Kafka – Ein Landarzt) is a 2007 anime short film by Kōji Yamamura.

The film is a direct interpretation of Franz Kafka's short story "A Country Doctor", voiced by kyōgen actors of the Shigeyama house.

The film has won several awards, including the 2008 Ōfuji Noburō Award from the Mainichi Film Concours and the 2007 Grand Prize at the Ottawa International Animation Festival. It was also included in the Animation Show of Shows in 2008.

== Plot ==
The story follows a country doctor urgently called to treat a young patient.

More and more, the doctor gets involved in surreal experiences as he is transported to his patient by seemingly "unearthly horses" in the blink of an eye. While treating the patient, he fails to find the fatal wound which results in humiliation by the villagers and an endless return trip, losing everything.

It tells the story of the continuous pressure on doctors, and the never-ending impossible expectations weighing on their shoulders.
