= The Diary (1974 film) =

1974 animated short film by Nedjeljko Dragić

- Directed by: Nedeljko Dragić
- Distributed by: Zagreb Film
- Release date: June 15, 1974
- Country: Yugoslavia
- Language: Croat

The Diary (Croatian: Dnevnik) is a 1974 Yugoslavian cartoon by artist Nedeljko Dragić.

== Plot ==
A man goes walking and gets redrawn as an unconventional (and largely improvised) series of other shapes and figures with nostalgic memories of both the wonders and alienations of life.
