= Zlatko Grgić =

Croatian animator (1931-88)

Zlatko Grgić (21 June 1931 – 4 October 1988) was a Croatian animator who emigrated to Canada in the late 1960s.

Born in Zagreb, then in Yugoslavia, Grgić was nominated for the Academy Award for Animated Short Film at the 52nd Academy Awards for his 1979 film Dream Doll, produced by Bob Godfrey.

== Zagreb Film ==
Grgić created the animated series Professor Balthazar for Zagreb Film and also animated 24 episodes of its series Maxi Cat (1971–73). His other credits include the 1965 animated shorts Peti and Đavolja Posla (The Devil's Work); Mali i veliki (Le Petit et le grand) (1966); Muzikalno prase (The Musical Pig) (1966), winner of the Palme d'or at Cannes Film Festival, the 1968 shorts Tolerance and Suitcase as well as Ptica i crvek (The Bird and the Worm) (1977).

== Pre-Zagreb Film ==
- The Case Of Whicked Mouse (1961)
- Cesta (1963)
- Robot (1978)
- International Film Festival (1982)
- International Film Factory (1985)

== NFB ==
Grgić was asked to join the National Film Board of Canada (NFB) after producers saw his film Scabies. He directed and animated three shorts with the NFB: Hot Stuff (1971), named best educational film at the Zagreb World Festival of Animated Films, Who Are We? (1974) and Deep Threat (1977).

== Legacy ==
He has an award named after him at the Zagreb World Festival of Animated Films: the Zlatko Grgić Prize for best first production apart from educational institutions.
