= Satiemania =

1978 short animated film

- Cover
- Directed by: Zdenko Gašparović
- Music by: Erik Satie
- Production company: Zagreb Film
- Release date: June 23, 1978
- Running time: 14 minutes
- Country: SFR Yugoslavia
- Language: none

Satiemania is a 1978 short animated film by Zdenko Gašparović from Zagreb Film animation studio. The short was created to visualize the music of Erik Satie.

== Development and themes ==
Gašparović drew much of the movie on his kitchen table in ink, pastels and pencil. From a visual perspective, it is described as an impressionistic "metaphor for people drifting mindlessly down the stream of life", but Gašparović states that it was partially based on the stories he had heard as a young boy. It is a series of small animated segments set to six music pieces by Erik Satie (as performed by Aldo Ciccolini). One example of a whimsical approach to the creation of the short includes an issue of Christian Herald he bought at a junk store, which he subsequently included in the film as a waving flag. Other visual gags include a piano biting off the upper half of the pianist during mid-note.

== Reception and legacy ==
The short premiered on 23 June 1978 as part of the 3rd Animafest Zagreb, where it was awarded Grand-prix by June Foray in Vatroslav Lisinski Concert Hall. It went on becoming a hit on other world animation festivals. It was eventually shortlisted for an Academy Award. Due to its popularity and success, it was subsequently included in courses on animation in colleges and universities. Peter Cowie described it as a "witty and irreverent portrait of the human species".

The short influenced a number of other artists such as Michaela Pavlátová.
