= Mt. Head =

2002 film by Kōji Yamamura

- Directed by: Koji Yamamura
- Written by: Shōji Yonemura
- Based on: Rakugo "頭山"
- Starring: Takeharo Kunimoto
- Production company: Yamamura Animation
- Release date: 2002
- Running time: 10 minutes
- Country: Japan
- Language: Japanese

Mt. Head (Japanese: 頭山, Hepburn: Atamayama) is a 2002 anime short film. It was nominated at the 75th Academy Awards in the category of Academy Award for Best Animated Short Film. The film also won the Grand Prix (Annecy Cristal) at the 2003 Annecy International Animation Film Festival, the Grand Prix at the 2004 World Festival of Animated Films in Zagreb, and the Grand Prix at the 2004 Hiroshima International Animation Festival.

== Plot ==
It is based on Japanese rakugo of the same title, with a slightly modernized setting. A stingy man eats the pits of some cherries, causing a tree to grow on top of his head. When crowds start converging and partying on his head, being noisy, he gets annoyed and uproots the tree. Rainwater pours in the hole, creating a lake. After that, a lot of swimmers converge on this lake, and his head is too noisy again. Enraged, the man commits suicide by throwing himself into the lake on his own head.

== Plot of the original rakugo version ==
The original differs in that he ate just one cherry with its pit, and instead of swimmers, a lot of anglers converge on his lake and fish hooks are hooked to the man's eyelid and nose.

== Awards ==
- Annecy Cristal (Grand Prix), 2003 Annecy International Animation Film Festival
- Grand Prix, 2004 World Festival of Animated Films, Zagreb
- Grand Prix, 2004 Hiroshima International Animation Festival
- Excellence Award, Animation Division, 6th Japan Media Arts Festival
- Nominee, Academy Award for Best Animated Short Film, 75th Academy Awards

== See also ==
- Japanese folklore
- 2002 in film
