= The Fly (1967 film) =

- Directed by: Vladimir Jutrisa; Aleksandar Marks
- Screenplay by: Aleksandar Marks; Vatroslav Mimica
- Distributed by: Zagreb Film
- Release date: July 22, 1967
- Running time: 9 minutes
- Country: Yugoslavia
- Language: Serbo-Croatian

The Fly (Serbo-Croatian: Muha) is a 1967 Yugoslavian cartoon.

== Plot ==
A man is standing in the scene when a fly arrives and begins to irritate him. He tries to swat the fly, but it keeps growing bigger to the point where it shatters the scene. Eventually, the man and the fly decide to negotiate.

== Creators ==
- Written by: Vatroslav Mimica
- Backgrounds: Pavao Štalter
- Drawings: Aleksandar Marks
- Animation: Vladimir Jutriša
- Assistant director: Darko Gospodnetić
- Cinematography: Ivan Hercigonja
- Sound recording: Mladen Prebil
- Music supervision: Tea Brunšmid
- Directed by: Aleksandar Marks, Vladimir Jutriša
