= Zagreb Film =

Croatian film company

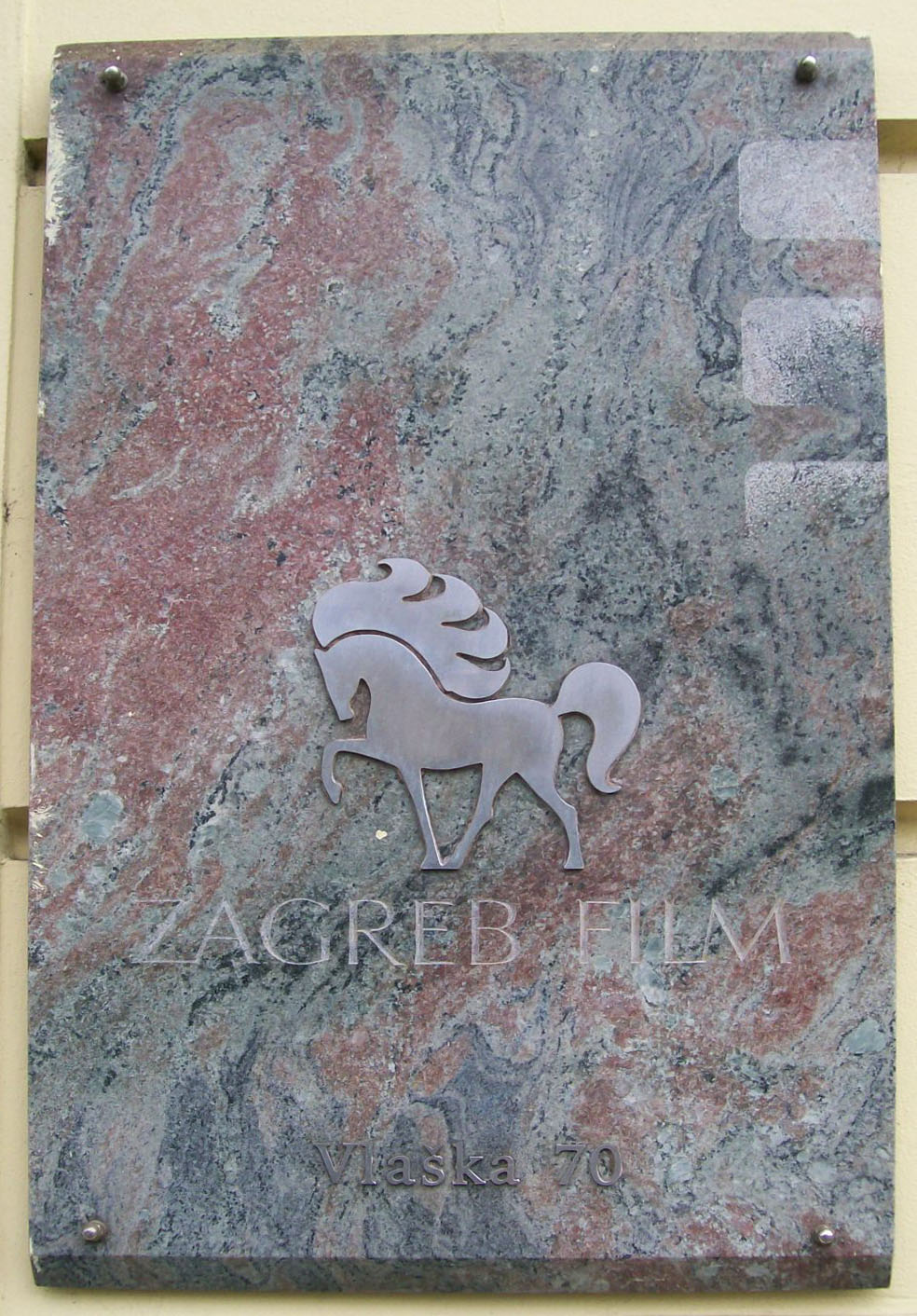
- Type: Private company limited by shares
- Industry: Animation, film production
- Founded: 1953; 73 years ago
- Headquarters: Zagreb, Croatia
- Website: zagrebfilm.hr

Zagreb Film is a Croatian film company principally known for its animation studio. From Zagreb, it was founded in 1953. They have produced hundreds of animated films, as well as documentaries, television commercials, educational films and several feature films.

Zagreb Film produced the cartoon series Professor Balthazar (Croatian: Profesor Baltazar), created by Zlatko Grgić, about an amusing professor who solved various imaginative problems. Another cartoon of theirs was Inspector Mask (Inspektor Maska).

== History ==
Zagreb Film was founded in 1953 with the main profile of an animated films production company. Since then, more than 600 animated films, 14 feature films, about 600 documentaries and 800 commercials as well as 600 educational films were produced in this studio.

The company operates at three locations; one with ateliers for artists, shooting equipment, small theater and one with film warehouse, video multiplication room and administration. The third location is used for commercial purposes. During all these years, Zagreb Film received more than 400 awards on Festivals all over the world. Among them is the Academy Award - Oscar for the best animated short film in 1962 where Dušan Vukotić had become the first European animator to win the Oscar award for Surogat (Ersatz). Wealth of genres and different styles that were growing in Zagreb was the reason for Georges Sadoul, the French film theorist, critic and historian to coin the term Zagreb school of animation, what became the trademark for top grade and innovative animated films made in Zagreb. Besides artistic films Zagreb film produced films and TV series like Inspektor Maska, Professor Balthazar, The Little Flying Bears and Maxi Cat. Most of these films were distributed internationally. The biggest global success was with the famous character of Professor Balthazar.

== Works ==
=== Animated TV series ===
==== 1950s and 1960s ====
- Inspektor Maska (1962–1963)
- Professor Balthazar (1967–1978)

==== 1970s ====
- Adam (1970)
- Maxi Cat (1971–1973)
- Ptica i crvek (1978–1984)

=== Animated shorts ===
- Cowboy Jimmy (1957)
- The Inspector Comes Home (1959)
- Cow on the Moon (1959)
- Piccolo (1959)
- Don Kihot (1961)
- Surogat (1961) - 1961 Academy Award winner
- Bumerang (1962)
- The Game (1963) - 1963 Academy Award nominee
- The Wall (1966)
- Curiosity (1967)
- The Fly (1968)
- Tup Tup (1972) - 1972 Academy Award nominee
- Second Class Passenger (1973)
- The Diary (1974)
- Satiemania (1978)
- Fisheye (1980)
- Big Time (1990)
- Anno Domini (1991)

=== Co-productions ===
- The Little Flying Bears (1988), co-production with CineGroupe
- Dream Doll (1979), co-production with Bob Godfrey Films and Halas and Batchelor (Oscar nominee)
- Man: The Polluter (1973), co-production with the National Film Board of Canada

== Compilations of Zagreb animation ==
- The Best of Zagreb Film: Be Careful What You Wish For/The Classic Collection (2000)

== Legacy ==
Surogat won an Academy Award for Short Subject (Cartoons) in 1962, and was featured in Jerry Beck's compilation of The 50 Greatest Cartoons. While not on the list, it was included in the list of 57 "Other Great Cartoons" that did not make the list but were featured as an honorable mention. It was also an inspiration of the "Worker and Parasite" section in The Simpsons episode "Krusty Gets Kancelled".

The Professor Balthazar series was also an influence on American animator Craig McCracken's Wander Over Yonder.

== See also ==
- Zagreb School of Animated Films
- Pannonia Film Studio
- Modernist animation
