= Surogat =

1961 animated film by Dušan Vukotić

- Directed by: Dušan Vukotić
- Written by: Rudolf Sremec
- Cinematography: Zlatko Sacer
- Music by: Tomica Simović
- Color process: Eastmancolor
- Production companies: Herts-Lion; Zagreb Film
- Distributed by: Herts-Lion; Gelt Ventures
- Release date: December 31, 1961
- Running time: 10 minutes
- Country: Yugoslavia

Surogat (known in English as Ersatz and The Substitute) is a 1961 Yugoslavian animated comedy short film by director Dušan Vukotić, produced by Zagreb Film, then a Yugoslav film production company. The film is also known by several other names in other languages: Cyррогат, Der Ersatz, Le Succēdanē and Surrogatto.

== Plot ==
The film begins with a man taking a trip to the beach. He touches the water with his foot, checking its temperature; finding the temperature is good, he bring objects to the beach, but finds that every object (as well every character, himself, and the environment) is inflatable. He blows up one object with an air pump; he continues blowing up objects, and later, he goes to his car, finding his shorts, which look the car's "plug." He removes this "plug", and the car proceeds to deflate. The man throws the now-compressed car at a tree. Later, he changes into what he was wearing before and continues pumping up objects, one being a fishing rod. He blows up a fish, kicking it into the sea, but immediately, the fish leaves the water and ends up in a frying pan, where it is cooked. The man eats the fish as his lunch.

Later, the man goes in search of a woman. He sits to inflate other objects with the air pump; the first object inflated is a woman, but the man rejects her, immediately deflating her. The man proceeds to inflate a second object, resulting in another woman. The man checks the woman, looking at her breasts, and proceeds to pump her up more, making her breasts grow. The man now wants the woman by his side, but the woman stomps away, upset. The man jumps on her and proceeds to kiss her, but she escapes from him. She then seems to offer him a kiss, but this is actually is a trap, and the woman proceeds to slap him. The man immediately goes in the water to treat the wound. The woman goes to him, using him as a trampoline; the man sees that she is swimming in the water to tease to him.

Angry, the man goes to his objects, pumping up a shark. The man tries to gain her affection with a fake rescue, but the woman sees what is doing. To avoid revealing that the rescue is a hoax, the man gives the shark his hat, and puts the shark in the water. The woman, still swimming, notices the hat, thinking that it's actually the man, and she hits it; suddenly, the shark reveals itself, and the woman gets scared, but the man is ready to the rescue her. He catches the woman with the fishing rod. However, the shark is now coming at both of them.

The woman panics, but the man is ready to battle the shark, putting on goggles and grabbing a harpoon. He goes in into the water, ready to kill the shark. The woman thinks the man is dead, but the man reappears alive, with the shark inside a giant sardine can. The woman claps for the man's defeating the shark, but the sardine can opens, revealing the shark is alive, and it reveals the fake rescue by deflating itself. The woman stomps away, angry at the deception. The man is angry about his failed plan, smacking his head multiple times.

The man goes to the woman again, trying to jump on her, but the woman sees a handsome man windsurfing while brushing her hair. The woman, entranced by the handsome man, goes to him, leaving the first man. The woman calls to the handsome man, who notices the woman and quickly grabs her. The first man notices that the woman is now with the handsome man, watching as they go to a small island. Angry, he follows them and sees how the handsome man has gained the woman's love.

The first man angrily grabs the woman's "plug", located on her foot, and deflates her. The handsome man, seeing that his love has "died", proceeds to deflate himself. The first man takes back the deflated woman.

Night falls, and the man picks up his objects, leaving the beach. As he leaves, he pulls the environment's "plug", and the whole beach compresses into a small object . The man pumps up another object, which turns into a roadway; however, on the roadway there's a tack, and his car explodes upon touching it. The roadway deflates, and the man flies and falls. The short ends with the man on the ground, where his "plug" pops, making him deflate.

== Reception and legacy ==
The film won an Academy Award for Short Subjects (Cartoons) in 1962.

It was featured in animation historian Jerry Beck's The 50 Greatest Cartoons, where it appears one of 57 "Other Great Cartoons" that did not qualify for the main list but had nonetheless received "a substantial number of votes" as honorable mentions. The Academy Film Archive preserved Ersatz in 2012.

According to David Silverman, animator and producer for The Simpsons, the character designs for the in-show cartoon "Worker and Parasite", in the episode "Krusty Gets Kancelled", were based on Surogat. Simpsons creator Matt Groening said "Worker and Parasite" was one of his favorite moments from the show.
