= Dušan Vukotić =

Yugoslav film maker

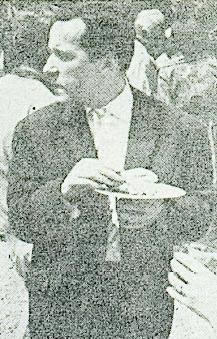
- Born: 7 February 1927; Bileća, Kingdom of Serbs, Croats and Slovenes
- Died: 8 July 1998 (aged 71); Krapinske Toplice, Croatia
- Occupations: Film director, screenwriter
- Years active: 1951–1995
- Awards: Academy Award for Animated Short Film (1962); Order of Danica Hrvatska

Dušan Vukotić (Serbo-Croat Cyrillic: Душан Вукотић; 7 February 1927 – 8 July 1998) was a Yugoslav, Montenegrin and Croatian cartoonist, author and director of animated films. He is the best known member of the Zagreb school of animated films.

== Biography ==
Vukotić was born in Bileća, Kingdom of Serbs, Croats and Slovenes to father Radovan Vukotić and mother Darinka Vučinić. His father Radovan was a Royal Yugoslav Army sub-colonel who got captured in the vicinity of Gornji Milanovac by the invading Wehrmacht force during the Nazi German invasion of Yugoslavia, spending the remainder of World War II in Osnabrück prison camp. His mother Darinka was a daughter of Milutin Vučinić, Montenegrin army officer and one time prime minister. His paternal grandfather Mojaš "Kinjo" Vukotić who died during the 1912-1913 Siege of Scutari was serdar Janko Vukotić's brother.

== Career ==
In 1953, Vukotić became one of the founding members of Zagreb Film. He worked there for over four decades and directed cartoons such as Cow on the Moon.

He directed Surogat ("Ersatz"), which won an Oscar for best animated short for 1961, becoming the first foreign film to do so. Another of his films, Igra ("The Game"), was nominated for an Academy Award in 1964.

After the 1960s, he rarely made short animated films, making three full-length movies - a fantasy tale for children, Sedmi kontinent ("The Seventh Continent", 1966), an action movie, Akcija Stadion ("Operation Stadium") about the resistance of Zagreb students to the Ustaša regime in 1941, and the science fiction/horror parody Gosti iz galaksije ("Visitors from the Galaxy of Arkana", 1981). In 1963, he was a member of the jury at the 3rd Moscow International Film Festival.

== Personal life ==
He also taught film directing at the Zagreb Academy for Dramatic Art from the founding of its Film department in 1967 until his retirement in the early 1990s.

After 1977, he was a member of the Montenegrin Academy of Sciences and Arts.

In 1994 he received Lifetime Achievement Award at the World Festival of Animated Film - Animafest Zagreb.

At the time of his death, Vukotić was preparing a production of his new science fiction movie, co-written by the Croatian science fiction writer Aleksandar Žiljak.

Vukotić died in Krapinske Toplice near Zagreb at the age of 71.
