= List of foreign-language films nominated for Academy Awards =

This article lists all the foreign language films which have been nominated for or won Academy Awards in any category, not just the International Feature Film category (known before the 2019 awards as Best Foreign Language Film) itself. The Academy Awards, popularly known as the Oscars, are among the world's oldest and most prestigious film prizes. They were first handed out on May 16, 1929 by the U.S.-based Academy of Motion Picture Arts and Sciences, and have been given annually ever since. Even though a separate prize has existed for foreign language films since the 1956 Academy Awards, such films continue to be eligible for Academy Awards in other categories, including Best Picture, provided that they have been commercially released in Los Angeles County, California and that they comply with the special rules governing those categories. The French comedy À Nous la Liberté (1931) was the first foreign language film to be nominated for an Academy Award (Best Art Direction); the German-language Swiss drama Marie-Louise (1944) was the first to actually win one (Best Original Screenplay).

Although a Los Angeles theatrical release is not required for eligibility for the Best International Feature Film Award itself, it is a prerequisite for consideration for Academy Awards in other categories. In the past, this had enabled some foreign language films to receive nominations over multiple years, the most recent case being that of the Italian comedy-drama Amarcord (1973). Because such films were still unreleased in Los Angeles when they were submitted to the Academy, they could only be nominated in the Foreign Language Film category. However, upon their Los Angeles release, they became eligible for other Academy Awards, and often ended up receiving nominations in various categories one year after their initial Foreign Language Film nomination. Presently, such nominations over multiple years are no longer possible since the current rules of the Academy unambiguously state that: "Films nominated for the Best International Feature Film Award shall not be eligible for Academy Awards consideration in any category in any subsequent Awards year." This restriction, however, does not apply to submitted films that were not selected as nominees. The Brazilian film City of God (2002) was thus able to receive four Academy Award nominations for the 2003 Academy Awards, even though it had failed to garner a Foreign Language Film nomination as Brazil's official submission for the 2002 Academy Awards.

== Background ==
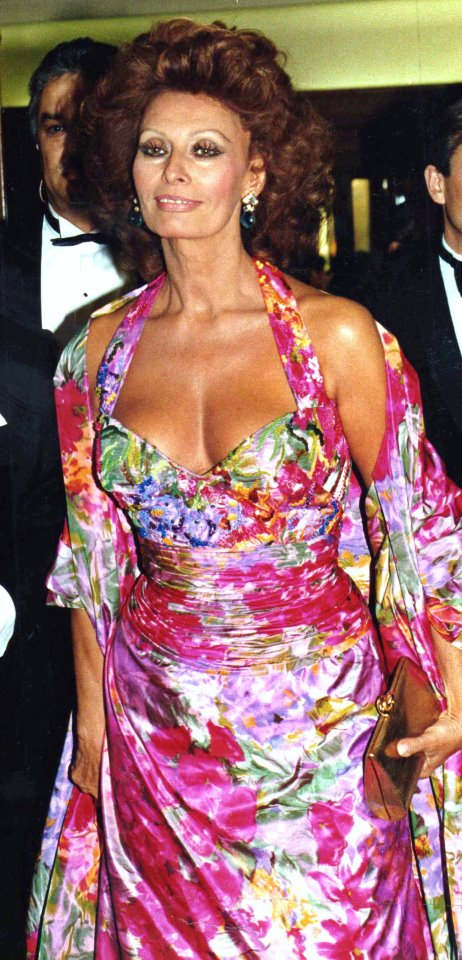
Sophia Loren (here in 1991) was the first ever actress to win an Academy Award for a foreign language performance, for her work in Two Women (1960)

Foreign films are not to be confused with foreign language films. A foreign film is a motion picture produced outside the United States, regardless of the language used in its dialogue track. A foreign language film, on the other hand, is a predominantly non-English speaking motion picture, regardless of where it was produced. Although the overwhelming majority of foreign language films are foreign, this is not always the case: in recent years, for instance, several non-English speaking American films such as The Passion of the Christ (2004), Letters from Iwo Jima (2006) or Minari (2020) have been nominated for Academy Awards (American films have never been eligible for the Best International Feature Film Award, even if none of the dialogue is in English). Such films are included in this list. On the other hand, foreign films where the majority of the dialogue is in English — such as the Indo-British co-production of Gandhi (1982) — are not taken into account. The article also includes films such as the Japanese anime Spirited Away (2001) that were initially released in their native country in a foreign language but were nominated by the Academy for the English-dubbed version under which they were shown in Los Angeles. The films are grouped by award category, and are arranged chronologically within each category. The years are listed as per Academy convention, and generally correspond to the year of film release; the ceremonies are always held the following year. The winning films are in bold and in light blue background; the presence of an Oscar statuette indicates the official recipient of the award.

== Best Picture ==
The Best Picture category has existed since the creation of the Academy Awards. Its name has changed several times over the years. When Grand Illusion (1937) was nominated, the name of the category was Outstanding Production; the Best Picture designation has been continuously used since the 1962 Academy Awards. Individual producers have been officially nominated for this award since the 1951 Academy Awards. Previously, the nominations went to the production companies instead.

Year	Film title used in nomination	Original title	Award recipient(s)	Country of production	Language(s)	Notes
1938 (11th)	Grand Illusion	La Grande Illusion	Réalisation d'art cinématographique (production company)	France	French (some parts in German, English, and Russian)	^{[A]}
1969 (42nd)	Z	Z	Jacques Perrin; Ahmed Rachedi	France; Algeria	French
1972 (45th)	The Emigrants	Utvandrarna	Bengt Forslund	Sweden	Swedish
1973 (46th)	Cries and Whispers	Viskningar och rop	Ingmar Bergman	Sweden	Swedish
1995 (68th)	Il Postino: The Postman	Il postino	Mario Cecchi Gori; Vittorio Cecchi Gori; Gaetano Daniele	Italy	Italian (some parts in Spanish)	(Note: The film was not submitted for consideration by Italy, possibly due to being directed by a British person)
1998 (71st)	Life Is Beautiful	La vita è bella	Elda Ferri; Gianluigi Braschi	Italy	Italian (some parts in German and English)
2000 (73rd)	Crouching Tiger, Hidden Dragon	Wòhǔ Cánglóng (pinyin) 臥虎藏龍 (traditional Chinese) 卧虎藏龙 (simplified Chinese)	Bill Kong; Hsu Li-kong; Ang Lee	Taiwan; China; Hong Kong; United States	Mandarin
2006 (79th)	Babel	Babel	Alejandro González Iñárritu; Jon Kilik; Steve Golin	United States; Mexico; France	English, Arabic, Spanish, Japanese, Japanese Sign Language, Berber languages
2006 (79th)	Letters from Iwo Jima	Letters from Iwo Jima	Clint Eastwood; Steven Spielberg; Robert Lorenz	United States	Japanese (some parts in English)
2012 (85th)	Amour	Amour	Margaret Menegoz; Stefan Arndt; Veit Heiduschka; Michael Katz	Austria; France; Germany	French
2018 (91st)	Roma	Roma	Gabriela Rodríguez; Alfonso Cuarón	Mexico; United States	Spanish, Mixtec
2019 (92nd)	Parasite	Gisaengchung 기생충	Kwak Sin-ae; Bong Joon-ho	South Korea	Korean
2020 (93rd)	Minari	Minari	Christina Oh	United States	Korean (some parts in English)
2021 (94th)	Drive My Car	Doraibu mai kā ドライブ・マイ・カー	Teruhisa Yamamoto	Japan	Japanese (some parts in English, Korean Sign Language, German, Mandarin, Tagalog, Indonesian, and Korean)
2022 (95th)	All Quiet on the Western Front	Im Westen nichts Neues	Malte Grunert	Germany; United States	German (some parts in French)
2023 (96th)	Anatomy of a Fall	Anatomie d'une chute	Marie-Ange Luciani; David Thion	France	French, English (some parts in German)
2023 (96th)	Past Lives	Past Lives	David Hinojosa; Christine Vachon; Pamela Koffler	United States; South Korea	Korean, English
2023 (96th)	The Zone of Interest	The Zone of Interest	James Wilson	United Kingdom; Poland; United States	German (some parts in Polish and Yiddish)
2024 (97th)	Emilia Pérez	Emilia Pérez	Pascal Caucheteux; Jacques Audiard	France; Mexico; Belgium	Spanish (some parts in English)
2024 (97th)	I'm Still Here	Ainda Estou Aqui	Maria Carlota Bruno; Rodrigo Teixeira	Brazil	Portuguese
2025 (98th)	The Secret Agent	O Agente Secreto	Emilie Lesclaux	Brazil	Portuguese
2025 (98th)	Sentimental Value	Affeksjonsverdi	Maria Ekerhovd; Andrea Berentsen Ottmar	Norway; France; Germany; Denmark; Sweden; United Kingdom	Norwegian, English, Swedish, Danish

== Documentary Feature ==
The Academy Award for Best Documentary Feature category has existed since 1942.

Year	Film title used in nomination	Original title	Award recipient(s)	Country of production	Language(s)	Notes
1942 (15th)	Moscow Strikes Back	Разгром немецких войск под Москвой (Razgrom Nemetskikh Voysk Pod Moskvoy)	Artkino (distribution company)	Soviet Union	Russian (nominated for its English-dubbed version)
1951 (24th)	Kon-Tiki	Kon-Tiki	Olle Nordemar (producer)	Norway; Sweden	Norwegian
1955 (28th)	Heartbreak Ridge	Crèvecœur	René Risacher (producer)	France	French
1956 (29th)	The Silent World	Le Monde du silence	Jacques-Yves Cousteau (director & writer)	France; Italy	French
1956 (29th)	Where Mountains Float	Hvor bjergene sejler	The Government Film Committee of Denmark	Denmark	Danish, Greenlandic
1957 (30th)	Torero!	Torero!	Manuel Barbachano Ponce	Mexico	Spanish, English
1959 (32nd)	Serengeti Shall Not Die	Serengeti darf nicht sterben	Bernhard Grzimek (director & writer)	West Germany	German
1961 (34th)	Sky Above and Mud Beneath	Le Ciel et la Boue	Arthur Cohn; René Lafuite	France; Liechtenstein	French
1961 (34th)	La Grande Olimpiade (Olympic Games 1960)	La grande olimpiade	dell Istituto Nazionale Luce, Comitato Organizzatore Del Giochi Della XVII Olimpiade	Italy	Italian
1962 (35th)	Alvorada – Brazil's Changing Face	Alvorada – Aufbruch in Brasilien	Hugo Niebeling	West Germany	German
1963 (36th)	The Link and the Chain	Le Maillon et la Chaîne	Paul de Roubaix	France	French
1964 (37th)	World Without Sun	Le Monde sans soleil	Jacques-Yves Cousteau	France; Italy	French
1964 (37th)	The Human Dutch	Alleman	Bert Haanstra	Netherlands	Dutch
1964 (37th)	Over There, 1914-18	14-18	Jean Aurel	France	French
1965 (38th)	To Die in Madrid	Mourir à Madrid	Frédéric Rossif	France	French (some parts in English)
1966 (39th)	Le Volcan Interdit (The Forbidden Volcano)	Le Volcan interdit	Haroun Tazieff	France	French
1967 (40th)	The Anderson Platoon	La Section Anderson	Pierre Schoendoerffer	France	French
1969 (42nd)	The Olympics in Mexico	Olimpiada en México	Comite Organizador de los Juegos de la XIX Olimpiada	Mexico	Spanish
1970 (43rd)	Chariots of the Gods	Erinnerungen an die Zukunft	Dr. Harald Reinl	West Germany	German
1971 (44th)	The Sorrow and the Pity	Le Chagrin et la Pitié	Marcel Ophuls	France; Switzerland; West Germany	French (some parts in German and English)
1972 (45th)	Ape and Super-Ape	Bij de beesten af	Bert Haanstra	Netherlands	Dutch
1973 (46th)	Battle of Berlin	Schlacht um Berlin	Bengt von zur Mühlen	West Germany	German
1974 (47th)	The 81st Blow	Ha-Makah Hashmonim V'Echad המכה ה-81	Jacques Ehrlich; David Bergman; Haim Gouri	Israel	Yiddish, Hebrew
1978 (51st)	The Lovers' Wind	Le Vent des amoureux	Albert Lamorisse	France; Iran	French
1980 (53rd)	The Yellow Star: The Persecution of the Jews in Europe 1933–45	Der gelbe Stern – Die Judenverfolgung 1933–1945	Bengt von zur Mühlen; Arthur Cohn	West Germany; Liechtenstein	German, English, Hebrew
1985 (58th)	Las Madres: The Mothers of Plaza de Mayo	Las madres de la Plaza de Mayo	Susana Blaustein Muñoz; Lourdes Portillo	Argentina	Spanish
1986 (59th)	Chile: Hasta Cuando?	Chile: Hasta Cuando?	David Bradbury	Australia; United States	Spanish (some parts in English)
1988 (61st)	Hotel Terminus: The Life and Times of Klaus Barbie	Hôtel Terminus	Marcel Ophuls	France; West Germany; United States	French, German, Spanish, English
1993 (66th)	Children of Fate	Children of Fate: Life and Death in a Sicilian Family	Susan Todd; Andrew Young	United States	Italian (some parts in English)
1999 (72nd)	Buena Vista Social Club	Buena Vista Social Club	Wim Wenders; Ulrich Felsberg	Germany; Cuba; France; United Kingdom; United States	Spanish (some parts in English)
2001 (74th)	Children Underground	Children Underground	Edet Belzberg	United States	Romanian
2001 (74th)	Promises	Promises	Justine Shapiro; B.Z. Goldberg	United States	Arabic, Hebrew (some parts in English)
2002 (75th)	Winged Migration	Le Peuple migrateur	Jacques Perrin (director & writer)	France; Italy; Germany; Spain; Switzerland	French
2003 (76th)	Balseros	Balseros	Carles Bosch; Josep Maria Domènech	Spain	Spanish
2004 (77th)	Born into Brothels	Born into Brothels: Calcutta's Red Light Kids	Ross Kauffman; Zana Briski	United States	Bengali, English
2004 (77th)	The Story of the Weeping Camel	Die Geschichte vom weinenden Kamel	Luigi Falorni; Byambasuren Davaa	Mongolia; Germany	Mongolian
2005 (78th)	March of the Penguins	La Marche de l'empereur	Luc Jacquet; Yves Darondeau	France	French (some parts in English)
2006 (79th)	Iraq in Fragments	Iraq in Fragments	James Longley; John Sinno	United States	Kurdish, Arabic
2007 (80th)	War/Dance	War/Dance	Andrea Nix Fine; Sean Fine	United States	Acholi (some parts in English)
2008 (81st)	The Betrayal – Nerakhoon	The Betrayal – Nerakhoon	Ellen Kuras; Thavisouk Phrasavath	United States	Lao, English
2009 (82nd)	Burma VJ: Reporting from a Closed Country	Burma VJ - reporter i et lukket land	Anders Østergaard; Lise Lense-Møller	Denmark; Sweden; Norway; United Kingdom; United States; Germany; Netherlands; Israel; Spain; Belgium; Canada	Burmese, English
2009 (82nd)	Which Way Home	Which Way Home	Rebecca Cammisa	United States	Spanish, English
2010 (83rd)	Waste Land	Waste Land	Lucy Walker; Angus Aynsley	Brazil; United Kingdom	Portuguese, English
2011 (84th)	Pina	Pina	Wim Wenders; Gian-Piero Ringel	Germany; France; United Kingdom	German, French, English, Spanish, Croatian, Italian, Portuguese, Russian, Korean
2012 (85th)	5 Broken Cameras	Khams Kamīrāt Muḥaṭṭamah خمس كاميرات محطمة	Emad Burnat (director, producer & cinematographer); Guy Davidi (director, producer, writer & editor)	Palestine; Israel; France	Arabic, Hebrew
2012 (85th)	The Gatekeepers	The Gatekeepers	Dror Moreh; Philippa Kowarsky; Estelle Fialon	Israel; France	Hebrew, English
2013 (86th)	The Act of Killing	Jagal	Joshua Oppenheimer (director); Signe Byrge Sørensen (producer)	Denmark; Norway; United Kingdom; Indonesia	Indonesian
2013 (86th)	The Square	Al-Maydan الميدان	Jehane Noujaim (director & cinematographer); Karim Amer (producer)	Egypt; United States	Arabic (some parts in English)
2014 (87th)	The Salt of the Earth	Le Sel de la Terre	Wim Wenders (director, producer & writer); Juliano Ribeiro Salgado (director, writer & cinematographer); David Rosier (producer & writer)	France; Brazil; Italy	French; Portuguese (some parts in English)
2014 (87th)	Virunga	Virunga	Orlando von Einsiedel, Joanna Natasegara	Democratic Republic of the Congo; United Kingdom	French; Swahili (English)
2015 (88th)	Cartel Land	Tierra de Carteles	Matthew Heineman (director & producer); Tom Yellin (producer)	Mexico; United States	Spanish (some parts in English)
2015 (88th)	The Look of Silence	Senyap	Joshua Oppenheimer (director); Signe Byrge Sørensen (producer)	Denmark; Indonesia; Finland; Norway; United Kingdom; Israel; France; United States; Germany; Netherlands	Indonesian
2015 (88th)	Winter on Fire: Ukraine's Fight for Freedom	Зима у вогні: Боротьба України за свободу	Evgeny Afineevsky (director & producer); Den Tolmor (producer)	Ukraine; United Kingdom; United States	Ukrainian; Russian (some parts in English)
2016 (89th)	Fire at Sea	Fuocoammare	Gianfranco Rosi (director & producer); Donatella Palermo (producer)	Italy	Italian
2017 (90th)	Faces Places	Visages Villages	Agnès Varda (director); JR (director); Rosalie Varda (producer)	France	French
2018 (91st)	Of Fathers and Sons	Kinder des Kalifats	Talal Derki (director); Ansgar Frerich (producer); Eva Kemme (producer); Tobias N. Siebert (producer)	Germany	Arabic
2019 (92nd)	The Cave	غار	Feras Fayyad (director); Kirstine Barfod (producer); Sigrid Dyekjær (producer)	Syria; Denmark	Arabic; English
2019 (92nd)	The Edge of Democracy	Democracia em Vertigem	Petra Costa (director); Joanna Natasegara (producer); Shane Boris (producer); Tiago Pavan (producer)	Brazil	Portuguese; English
2019 (92nd)	For Sama	إلى سماء	Waad Al-Kateab (director and producer); Edward Watts (director)	United Kingdom; United States; Syria	Arabic
2019 (92nd)	Honeyland	Медена земја	Ljubomir Stefanov (director); Tamara Kotevska (director); Atanas Georgiev (producer)	North Macedonia	Macedonian; Turkish; Bosnian
2020 (93rd)	Collective	Colectiv	Alexander Nanau (director and producer); Bianca Oana (producer)	Romania; Luxembourg	Romanian
2020 (93rd)	The Mole Agent	El agente topo	Maite Alberdi (director); Marcela Santibañez (producer)	Chile; United States; Germany; Netherlands; Spain	Spanish
2021 (94th)	Ascension	登楼叹	Jessica Kingdon (director and producer); Kira Simon-Kennedy (producer); Nathan Truesdell (producer)	United States	Mandarin; English
2021 (94th)	Flee	Flugt	Jonas Poher Rasmussen (director); Monica Hellström (producer); Signe Byrge Sørensen (producer)	Denmark; United States; United Kingdom; France; Sweden; Norway	Danish
2021 (94th)	Writing with Fire	Writing with Fire	Sushmit Ghosh (director and producer); Rintu Thomas (director and producer)	India	Hindi
2022 (95th)	All That Breathes	All That Breathes	Shaunak Sen (director and producer); Aman Mann (producer); Teddy Leifer (producer)	India; United States; United Kingdom	Hindi
2022 (95th)	A House Made of Splinters	Будинок зі скалок	Simon Lereng Wilmont (director and producer); Monica Hellström (director and producer)	Denmark; Ukraine; Sweden	Russian; Ukrainian
2023 (96th)	20 Days in Mariupol	20 днів у Маріуполі	Mstyslav Chernov (director and producer); Michelle Mizner (producer); Raney Aronson-Rath (producer)	Ukraine	Ukrainian; English; Russian
2023 (96th)	The Eternal Memory	La memoria infinita	Maite Alberdi (director and producer); Juan de Dios Larraín (producer); Pablo Larraín (producer); Rocio Jadue (producer)	Chile	Spanish
2023 (96th)	Four Daughters	Les filles d'Olfa	Kaouther Ben Hania (director); Nadim Cheikhrouha (producer)	France; Germany; Tunisia; Saudi Arabia	Arabic
2023 (96th)	To Kill a Tiger	To Kill a Tiger	Nisha Pahuja (director and producer); Cornelia Principe (producer); David Oppenheim (producer)	Canada	Hindi
2024 (97th)	No Other Land	No Other Land	Basel Adra (director and producer); Hamdan Ballal (director and producer); Yuval Abraham (director and producer); Rachel Szor (producer)	Palestine; Norway	Arabic; English; Hebrew
2024 (97th)	Black Box Diaries	Black Box Diaries	Shiori Itô (director and producer); Eric Nyari (producer); Hanna Aqvilin (producer)	Japan; United States; United Kingdom	Japanese; English
2024 (97th)	Porcelain War	Porcelain War	Brendan Bellomo (director); Slava Leontyev (director); Aniela Sidorska (producer); Paula DuPré Pesmen (producer)	Ukraine; United States; Australia	Ukrainian; Russian; English
2024 (97th)	Soundtrack to a Coup d'Etat	Soundtrack to a Coup d'Etat	Johan Grimonprez (director and producer); Daan Milius (producer); Rémi Grellety (producer)	Belgium; France; Netherlands	Dutch; Russian; English; French; Arabic
2025 (98th)	Mr Nobody Against Putin	Mr. Nobody mod Putin	David Borenstein (director); Pavel Talankin (director); Helle Faber (producer); Alžběta Karásková (producer)	Denmark; Czech Republic; Germany; United Kingdom	Russian; English
2025 (98th)	Cutting Through Rocks	Cutting Through Rocks	Sara Khaki (director and producer); Mohammadreza Eyni (director and producer)	United States; Iran	Turkish; Persian; Azerbaijani; Arabic

== Documentary Short Film ==
The Academy Award for Best Documentary Short Film has been awarded since the 14th Academy Awards in 1941.

Year	Film title used in nomination	Original title	Award recipient(s)	Country of production	Language(s)	Notes
1941 (14th)	Russian Soil	Русская земля	Amkino	Soviet Union	Russian
1944 (17th)	Hymn of the Nations	Hymn of the Nations	United States Office of War Information	United States	English, Italian
1946 (19th)	Life at the Zoo	Жизнь в зоопарке	Artkino	Soviet Union	Russian
1949 (22nd)	1848	La Révolution de 1848	French Cinema General Cooperative	France	French
1958 (31st)	The Living Stone	The Living Stone	Tom Daly	Canada	Inuktitut, English
1958 (31st)	Overture	Oeuverture	Thorold Dickinson	Canada	Italian
1959 (32nd)	Glass	Glas	Bert Haanstra	Netherlands	Dutch
1960 (33rd)	Giuseppina	Giuseppina	James Hill	United Kingdom; Italy	Italian
1960 (33rd)	A City Called Copenhagen	En by ved navn København	Danish Film Institute	Denmark	Danish
1961 (34th)	Kahl	Kahl	Dido-Film-GmbH	West Germany	German
1961 (34th)	The Man in Gray	L'uomo in grigio	Benedetto Benedetti	Italy	Italian
1963 (36th)	Chagall	Chagall	Simon Schiffrin	France	French, English
1964 (37th)	Eskimo Artist: Kenojuak	Eskimo Artist: Kenojuak	National Film Board of Canada	Canada	English, Inuktitut
1965 (38th)	Overture	Nyitány	Mafilm Productions	Hungary	No dialogue
1966 (39th)	Adolescence	Adolescence	Marin Karmitz; Vladimir Forgency	France	French
1966 (39th)	Saint Matthew Passion	Részletek J.S. Bach Máté passiójából	Mafilm Studio	Hungary	Hungarian
1968 (41st)	Why Man Creates	Why Man Creates	Saul Bass	United States	English, Spanish
1970 (43rd)	Oisín	Oisín	Patrick Carey; Vivien Carey	(Republic of Ireland) Ireland	No dialogue
1970 (43rd)	Time Is Running Out	Time Is Running Out	Horst Dallmayr; Robert Menegoz	West Germany	German
1971 (44th)	Sentinels of Silence	Centinelas del silencio	Manuel Arango; Robert Amram	Mexico	Spanish
1971 (44th)	Adventures in Perception	Adventures in Perception	Han van Gelder	Netherlands	Dutch
1972 (45th)	This Tiny World	Deze kleine wereld	Charles and Martina Huguenot van der Linden	Netherlands	Dutch
1972 (45th)	Hundertwasser's Rainy Day	Hundertwassers Regentag	Peter Schamoni	West Germany	German
1972 (45th)	K-Z	K-Z	Giorgio Treves	Italy	Italian
1973 (46th)	Children at Work	Páistí ag obair	Louis Marcus	(Republic of Ireland) Ireland	Irish
1975 (48th)	Millions of Years Ahead of Man	Um Jahrmillionen voraus	Manfred Baier	West Germany	German
1976 (49th)	Blackwood	Blackwood	Tony Ianzelo; Andy Thomson	Canada	English, French
1979 (52nd)	Dae	Dae	Risto Teofilovski	(Socialist Federal Republic of Yugoslavia) Yugoslavia	Serbo-Croatian
1983 (56th)	You Are Free	Ihr zent frei	Dea Brokman; Ilene Landis	West Germany; Canada; United States	German
1984 (57th)	Recollections of Pavlovsk	Воспоминания о Павловске	Irina Kalinina	Soviet Union	Russian
1991 (64th)	Birdnesters of Thailand	Chasseurs des ténèbres	Éric Valli; Alain Majani	France	French
1994 (67th)	89mm from Europe	89 mm od Europy	Marcel Łoziński	Poland	Russian
2004 (77th)	The Children of Leningradsky	Dzieci z Leningradzkiego	Hanna Polak; Andrzej Celinski	Poland	Russian
2005 (78th)	God Sleeps in Rwanda	God Sleeps in Rwanda	Kimberlee Acquaro; Stacy Sherman	Rwanda; United States	Kinyarwanda
2006 (79th)	The Blood of Yingzhou District	颍州的孩子	Ruby Yang; Thomas Lennon	China; United States	English, Mandarin
2007 (80th)	La Corona	La Corona	Amanda Micheli; Isabel Vega	United States	Spanish
2007 (80th)	Salim Baba	Salim Baba	Tim Sternberg; Francisco Bello	United States	Bengali
2007 (80th)	Sari's Mother	Sari's Mother	James Longley	United States	Arabic
2008 (81st)	Smile Pinki	Smile Pinki	Megan Mylan	United States	Bhojpuri, Hindi
2008 (81st)	The Final Inch	The Final Inch	Irene Taylor Brodsky; Tom Grant	United States	English, Urdu, Hindi
2009 (82nd)	Rabbit à la Berlin	Królik po berlińsku	Bartek Konopka; Anna Wydra	Poland; Germany	Polish, German
2010 (83rd)	Strangers No More	Strangers No More	Karen Goodman; Kirk Simon	United States; Israel	English, Hebrew
2010 (83rd)	The Warriors of Qiugang	仇岗卫士	Ruby Yang; Thomas Lennon	United States	Mandarin
2011 (84th)	Saving Face	Saving Face	Daniel Junge; Sharmeen Obaid-Chinoy	United States; Pakistan	English, Urdu
2011 (84th)	The Tsunami and the Cherry Blossom	津波そして桜	Lucy Walker; Kira Carstensen	United States; Japan	Japanese
2012 (85th)	Inocente	Inocente	Sean Fine; Andrea Nix Fine	United States	English, Spanish
2013 (86th)	Karama Has No Walls	Karama Has No Walls	Sara Ishaq	Yemen; United Kingdom	Arabic
2014 (87th)	Joanna	Joanna	Aneta Kopacz	Poland	Polish
2014 (87th)	Our Curse	Nasza klątwa	Tomasz Śliwiński; Maciej Ślesicki	Poland	Polish
2014 (87th)	The Reaper	La parka	Gabriel Serra Arguello	Mexico; Nicaragua	Spanish
2015 (88th)	A Girl in the River: The Price of Forgiveness	دریا میں ایک لڑکی: معافی کی قیمت	Sharmeen Obaid-Chinoy	United States; Pakistan	English, Punjabi
2015 (88th)	Chau, Beyond the Lines	Chau, Beyond the Lines	Courtney Marsh; Jerry Franck	United States; Vietnam	Vietnamese
2015 (88th)	Claude Lanzmann: Spectres of the Shoah	Claude Lanzmann: Spectres of the Shoah	Adam Benzine	United States; Canada; United Kingdom; Germany	French, English, German
2016 (89th)	The White Helmets	The White Helmets	Orlando von Einsiedel; Joanna Natasegara	United Kingdom	English, Arabic
2016 (89th)	4.1 Miles	4.1 Miles	Daphne Matziaraki	Greece	Greek
2016 (89th)	Watani: My Homeland	Watani: My Homeland	Marcel Mettelsiefen; Stephen Ellis	United Kingdom; Syria; Germany	English, Arabic
2018 (91st)	Period. End of Sentence.	Period. End of Sentence.	Rayka Zehtabchi; Melissa Berton	United States	Hindi
2019 (92nd)	Learning to Skateboard in a Warzone (If You're a Girl)	Learning to Skateboard in a Warzone (If You're a Girl)	Carol Dysinger; Elena Andreicheva	United Kingdom	Farsi
2019 (92nd)	In the Absence	부재의기억	Yi Seung-Jun; Gary Byung-Seok Kam	South Korea	Korean
2020 (93rd)	Colette	Colette	Anthony Giacchino; Alice Doyard	United States	French
2020 (93rd)	Do Not Split	不割席	Anders Hammer; Charlotte Cook	Norway; United States	Cantonese, English, Mandarin
2021 (94th)	Three Songs for Benazir	دری سندری د بینظیر لپاره	Elizabeth Mirzaei; Gulistan Mirzaei	Afghanistan	Pashto, Dari
2022 (95th)	The Elephant Whisperers	The Elephant Whisperers	Kartiki Gonsalves; Guneet Monga	India; United States	Tamil, Jenu Kurumba
2022 (95th)	Haulout	Выход	Anders Hammer; Charlotte Cook	United Kingdom; Russia	Russian
2023 (96th)	Island in Between	Island in Between	S. Leo Chiang; Jean Tsien	Taiwan	English, Mandarin
2023 (96th)	Nǎi Nai & Wài Pó	奶奶跟外婆	Sean Wang; Sam Davis	United States	Mandarin
2024 (97th)	Instruments of a Beating Heart	Instruments of a Beating Heart	Ema Ryan Yamazaki; Eric Nyari	Japan	Japanese
2025 (98th)	Children No More: "Were and Are Gone"	Children No More: "Were and Are Gone"	Hilla Medalia; Sheila Nevins	United Kingdom; United States; Israel	Hebrew

== Animated Feature Film ==
The Animated Feature Film category has existed since the 2001 Academy Awards. The intended recipient(s) of this award must be designated by those responsible for the production of the film. Agreement on the designated recipient(s) has to be settled prior to the film's submission to the Academy. Unlike other Academy Awards, the Best Animated Feature Film Award therefore does not always go to the same crew member. However, the person(s) to whom it is given must always be "the key creative individual most clearly responsible for the overall achievement or a two-person team with shared and equal directing credit".

Year	Film title used in nomination	Original title	Award recipient(s)	Country of production	Language(s)	Notes
2002 (75th)	Spirited Away	Sen to Chihiro no kamikakushi 千と千尋の神隠し	Hayao Miyazaki (director & writer)	Japan	Japanese (nominated for its English-dubbed version)
2003 (76th)	The Triplets of Belleville	Les Triplettes de Belleville	Sylvain Chomet (director & writer)	France; Belgium; Canada; United Kingdom	French
2005 (78th)	Howl's Moving Castle	Hauru no ugoku shiro ハウルの動く城	Hayao Miyazaki (director, writer & executive producer)	Japan	Japanese (nominated for its English-dubbed version)
2007 (80th)	Persepolis	Persépolis	Marjane Satrapi; Vincent Paronnaud (directors & writers)	France; Iran	French (some parts in English, Persian & German)
2010 (83rd)	The Illusionist	L'Illusionniste	Sylvain Chomet (director & writer)	France	French (some parts in English and Gaelic)
2011 (84th)	A Cat in Paris	Une vie de chat	Alain Gaignol (director & writer); Jean-Loup Felicioli (director)	France; Belgium; Netherlands; Switzerland	French
2011 (84th)	Chico and Rita	Chico y Rita	Fernando Trueba (director & writer); Javier Mariscal (director)	Spain; United Kingdom	Spanish (some parts in English)
2013 (86th)	Ernest & Celestine	Ernest et Célestine	Benjamin Renner (director); Didier Brunner (producer)	France; Belgium	French
2013 (86th)	The Wind Rises	Kaze tachinu 風立ちぬ	Hayao Miyazaki (director & writer); Toshio Suzuki (producer)	Japan	Japanese
2014 (87th)	The Tale of the Princess Kaguya	Kaguya-hime no Monogatari かぐや姫の物語	Isao Takahata (director); Yoshiaki Nishimura (producer)	Japan	Japanese
2015 (88th)	Boy and the World	O Menino e o Mundo	Alê Abreu (director)	Brazil	Brazilian Portuguese
2015 (88th)	When Marnie Was There	Omoide no Mānī 思い出のマーニー	Hiromasa Yonebayashi (director); Yoshiaki Nishimura (producer)	Japan	Japanese
2016 (89th)	My Life as a Courgette	Ma vie de Courgette	Claude Barras (director); Max Karli (producer)	France; Switzerland	French
2016 (89th)	The Red Turtle	La Tortue Rouge レッドタートル ある島の物語	Michaël Dudok de Wit (director); Toshio Suzuki (producer)	France; Belgium; Japan	No dialogue
2018 (91st)	Mirai	Mirai no Mirai 未来のミライ	Mamoru Hosoda (director); Yuichiro Saito (producer)	Japan	Japanese
2019 (92nd)	I Lost My Body	J'ai perdu mon corps	Jérémy Clapin (director); Marc du Pontavice (producer)	France	French
2021 (94th)	Flee	Flugt	Jonas Poher Rasmussen (director); Monica Hellström (producer); Signe Byrge Sørensen (producer)	United States; United Kingdom; France; Sweden; Norway; Denmark	Danish
2023 (96th)	The Boy and the Heron	Kimitachi wa Dō Ikiru ka 君たちはどう生きるか	Hayao Miyazaki (director); Toshio Suzuki (producer)	Japan	Japanese
2024 (97th)	Flow	Straume	Gints Zilbalodis (director & producer); Matīss Kaža (producer); Ron Dyens (producer); Gregory Zalcman (producer)	Latvia; France; Belgium	No dialogue
2025 (98th)	Arco	Arco	Ugo Bienvenu (director & producer); Félix de Givry (producer); Sophie Mas (producer); Natalie Portman (producer)	France; United States	French
2025 (98th)	Little Amélie or the Character of Rain	Amélie et la métaphysique des tubes	Maïlys Vallade (director); Liane-Cho Han (director); Nidia Santiago (producer); Henri Magalon (producer)	France; Belgium	French

== Animated Short Film ==
The Academy Award for Best Animated Short Film has been awarded since the 5th Academy Awards, covering the year 1931–32, to the present. From 1932 to 1970, the category was presented as Short Subjects, Cartoons, and from 1971 to 1973 as Short Subjects, Animated Films. The first non-English-language international short to win was Zagreb Film's Ersatz (The Substitute) in 1961.

Year	Film title used in nomination	Original title	Award recipient(s)	Country of production	Language(s)	Notes
1951 (24th)	The Two Mouseketeers	The Two Mouseketeers	Fred Quimby	United States	English, French
1960 (33rd)	A Place in the Sun	O místo na slunci	František Vystrčil	Czechoslovakia	Czech
1961 (34th)	Ersatz	Surogat	Zagreb Film	(Socialist Federal Republic of Yugoslavia) Yugoslavia	Serbo-Croatian
1963 (36th)	My Financial Career	My Financial Career	Tom Daly; Colin Low	Canada	English, French
1963 (36th)	The Game	Igra	Dušan Vukotić	(Socialist Federal Republic of Yugoslavia) Yugoslavia	Serbo-Croatian
1967 (40th)	What on Earth!	What on Earth!	Robert Verrall; Wolf Koenig	Canada	English, French
1967 (40th)	Hypothese Beta	Hypothèse Beta	Jean-Charles Meunier	France	French
1971 (44th)	Evolution	Évolution	Michael Mills	Canada	English, French
1972 (45th)	Tup Tup	Tup Tup	Nedeljko Dragić	(Socialist Federal Republic of Yugoslavia) Yugoslavia; Italy	No dialogue
1973 (46th)	Pulcinella	Pulcinella	Guilo Gianini; Emanuele Luzzati	Italy	Italian
1975 (48th)	Sisyphus	Sisyphus	Marcell Jankovics	Hungary	No dialogue
1976 (49th)	Dedalo	Dedalo	Manfredo Manfredi	Italy	No dialogue
1979 (52nd)	Every Child	Every Child	Derek Lamb	Canada	English, French
1979 (52nd)	Dream Doll	Lutka snova	Bob Godfrey; Zlatko Grgić	United Kingdom (Socialist Federal Republic of Yugoslavia) Yugoslavia	No dialogue
1980 (53rd)	The Fly	A légy	Ferenc Rófusz	Hungary	No dialogue
1982 (55th)	Tango	Tango	Zbigniew Rybczyński	Poland	No dialogue
1985 (58th)	Anna & Bella	Anna & Bella	Cilia van Dijk	Netherlands	Dutch
1986 (59th)	A Greek Tragedy	A Greek Tragedy	Willem Thijssen; Linda Van Tulden	Belgium	Dutch
1987 (60th)	The Man Who Planted Trees	L'homme qui plantait des arbres	Frédéric Back	Canada	French, English
1989 (62nd)	Balance	Balance	Christoph Lauenstein; Wolfgang Lauenstein	West Germany	No dialogue
1989 (62nd)	The Cow	Корова	Aleksandr Petrov	Soviet Union	Russian
1990 (63rd)	Grasshoppers	Cavallette	Bruno Bozzetto	Italy	Italian
1992 (65th)	Reci, Reci, Reci...	Reci, Reci, Reci...	Michaela Pavlátová	Czechoslovakia	Czech
1993 (66th)	The Mighty River	Le Fleuve aux grandes eaux	Frédéric Back; Hubert Tison	Canada	English, French
1994 (67th)	The Monk and the Fish	Le Moine et le poisson	Michaël Dudok de Wit	France	No dialogue
1995 (68th)	Gagarin	Гагарин	Alexij Kharitidi	Russia	Russian
1996 (69th)	Quest	Quest	Tyron Montgomery; Thomas Stellmach	Germany	No dialogue
1996 (69th)	La Salla	La Salla	Richard Condie	Canada	Italian
1997 (70th)	The Mermaid	Русалка	Aleksandr Petrov	Russia	Russian
1998 (71st)	When Life Departs	Når livet går sin vej	Stefan Fjeldmark; Karsten Kiilerich	Denmark; Estonia	Danish
1999 (72nd)	The Old Man and the Sea	Старик и море	Aleksandr Petrov	Russia; Canada; Japan	English, French, Russian, Japanese
1999 (72nd)	3 Misses	3 Misses	Paul Driessen	Netherlands	No dialogue
2000 (73rd)	Father and Daughter	Father and Daughter	Michaël Dudok de Wit	Netherlands; United Kingdom	No dialogue
2002 (75th)	The Cathedral	Katedra	Tomek Baginski	Poland	No dialogue
2002 (75th)	Rocks	Das Rad	Chris Stenner; Heidi Wittlinger	Germany	German
2002 (75th)	Mt. Head	Atamayama 頭山	Kōji Yamamura	Japan	Japanese
2004 (77th)	Birthday Boy	Birthday Boy	Andrew Gregory; Sejong Park	Australia	Korean
2006 (79th)	Maestro	Maestro	Géza M. Tóth	Hungary	No dialogue
2007 (80th)	Even Pigeons Go to Heaven	Même les pigeons vont au paradis	Samuel Tourneux; Simon Vanesse	France	French
2007 (80th)	Madame Tutli-Putli	Madame Tutli-Putli	Chris Lavis; Maciek Szczerbowski	Canada	English, French
2007 (80th)	My Love	Моя любовь	Aleksandr Petrov	Russia	Russian
2008 (81st)	La Maison en Petits Cubes	Tsumiki no Ie つみきのいえ	Kunio Katō	Japan	Japanese
2008 (81st)	Lavatory – Lovestory	Уборная история — любовная история	Konstantin Bronzit	Russia	No dialogue
2008 (81st)	Oktapodi	Oktapodi	Thierry Marchand; Emud Mokhberi	France	French
2009 (82nd)	Logorama	Logorama	Nicolas Schmerkin	France	English, French
2009 (82nd)	French Roast	French Roast	Fabrice Joubert	France	French
2010 (83rd)	The Gruffalo	The Gruffalo	Max Lang; Jakob Schuh	United Kingdom; Germany	English, German
2010 (83rd)	Madagascar, a Journey Diary	Madagascar, a Journey Diary	Bastien Dubois	France	French
2011 (84th)	Sunday	Dimanche	Patrick Doyon	Canada	French
2013 (86th)	Possessions	Tsukumo 九十九	Shuhei Morita	Japan	Japanese
2015 (88th)	Bear Story	Historia de un oso	Pato Escala Pierart; Gabriel Osorio Vargas	Chile	Spanish
2015 (88th)	We Can't Live Without Cosmos	Мы не можем жить без космоса, My ne mozhem zhit bez kosmosa	Konstantin Bronzit	Russia	No dialogue
2016 (89th)	Blind Vaysha	Vaysha l'aveugle	Theodore Ushev	Canada	English, French
2017 (90th)	Garden Party	Garden Party	Victor Caire; Gabriel Grapperon	France	French
2019 (92nd)	Sister	Sister	Siqi Song	United States	Mandarin
2019 (92nd)	Mémorable	Mémorable	Bruno Collet; Jean-François Le Corre	France	French
2020 (93rd)	Genius Loci	Genius Loci	Adrien Mérigeau; Amaury Ovise	France	French
2020 (93rd)	Yes-People	Já-fólkið	Gísli Darri Halldórsson	Iceland	Icelandic
2021 (94th)	The Windshield Wiper	The Windshield Wiper	Alberto Mielgo; Leo Sanchez	United States; Spain	English, Romanian
2021 (94th)	Bestia	Bestia	Hugo Covarrubias; Tevo Díaz	Chile	Spanish
2021 (94th)	Boxballet	БоксБалет	Anton Dyakov	Russia	Russian
2022 (95th)	Ice Merchants	Ice Merchants	João Gonzalez; Bruno Caetano	Portugal; United Kingdom; France	No dialogue
2023 (96th)	Letter to a Pig	מכתב לחזיר	Tal Kantor; Amit R. Gicelter	Israel; France	Hebrew
2023 (96th)	Our Uniform	Our Uniform	Yegane Moghaddam	Iran	Persian
2023 (96th)	Pachyderme	Pachyderme	Stéphanie Clément; Marc Rius	France	French
2024 (97th)	In the Shadow of the Cypress	در سایه‌ی سرو	Hossein Molayemi; Shirin Sohani	Iran	No dialogue
2024 (97th)	Beautiful Men	Beautiful Men	Nicolas Keppens; Brecht Van Elslande	Belgium; France; Netherlands	Dutch, Turkish
2024 (97th)	Magic Candies	Magic Candies	Daisuke Nishio; Takashi Washio	Japan	Japanese
2024 (97th)	Yuck!	Beurk!	Loïc Espuche; Juliette Marquet	France	French
2025 (98th)	The Girl Who Cried Pearls	La jeune fille qui pleurait des perles	Chris Lavis; Maciek Szczerbowski	Canada	French, English
2025 (98th)	Butterfly	Papillon	Florence Miailhe; Ron Dyens	France	French, German
2025 (98th)	The Three Sisters	Три сестры	Konstantin Bronzit	Russia; Cyprus	No dialogue

== Art Direction/Production Design ==
The Production Design category, formerly named Best Art Direction until 2012, has existed since the creation of the Academy Awards. Until 1939, only one award was given. From 1940 until 1966, two awards were given, one for black-and-white films, the other for color films. The two awards were briefly merged at the 1957 and 1958 Academy Awards, and were permanently combined once again in a single category starting 1967. All the foreign language films that were nominated for the Art Direction Award between 1940 and 1966 received their nomination in the Black-and-White category, with the exception of Juliet of the Spirits (1965), which was nominated in the Color category.

Year	Film title used in nomination	Original title	Award recipient(s)	Country of production	Language(s)	Notes
1932 (5th)	À Nous la Liberté	À nous la liberté	Lazare Meerson	France	French	^{[A]}
1951 (24th)	La Ronde	La Ronde	D'Eaubonne	France	French	^{[A]}
1952 (25th)	Rashomon	Rashômon 羅生門	Matsuyama (art direction); H. Motsumoto (set decoration)	Japan	Japanese	^{[D]}
1954 (27th)	Le Plaisir	Le Plaisir	Max Ophüls	France	French	^{[A]}
1956 (29th)	Seven Samurai	Shichinin no samurai 七人の侍	Matsuyama (nominated as Takashi Matsuyama)	Japan	Japanese
1961 (34th)	La Dolce Vita	La dolce vita	Piero Gherardi	Italy	Italian (some parts in English, French & German)
1963 (36th)	Federico Fellini's 8½	8½	Piero Gherardi	Italy	Italian (some parts in English, French & German)
1966 (39th)	The Gospel According to St. Matthew	Il Vangelo secondo Matteo	Luigi Scaccianoce	Italy; France	Italian
1966 (39th)	Juliet of the Spirits	Giulietta degli spiriti	Piero Gherardi	Italy; France (West Germany) Germany (West)	Italian
1966 (39th)	Is Paris Burning?	Paris brûle-t-il?	Willy Holt; Marc Frederix; Pierre Guffroy	France; United States	French, German (some parts), English (some parts)
1968 (41st)	War and Peace	Voyna i mir Война и мир	Mikhail Bogdanov; Gennady Myasnikov (art direction); G. Koshelev; V. Uvarov (set decoration)	Soviet Union	Russian
1980 (53rd)	Kagemusha (The Shadow Warrior)	Kagemusha 影武者	Yoshirō Muraki	Japan	Japanese
1982 (55th)	La Traviata	La Traviata	Franco Zeffirelli (art direction); Gianni Quaranta (set decoration)	Italy; France	Italian
1983 (56th)	Fanny and Alexander	Fanny och Alexander	Anna Asp	Sweden; France (West Germany) Germany (West)	Swedish (some parts in German, Yiddish & English)
1985 (58th)	Ran	Ran 乱	Yoshirō Muraki; Shinobu Muraki (art direction)	Japan	Japanese
1990 (63rd)	Cyrano de Bergerac	Cyrano de Bergerac	Ezio Frigerio (art direction); Jacques Rouxel (set decoration)	France	French
2000 (73rd)	Crouching Tiger, Hidden Dragon	Wòhǔ Cánglóng (pinyin) 臥虎藏龍 (traditional Chinese) 卧虎藏龙 (simplified Chinese)	Tim Yip	Taiwan; China; Hong Kong; United States	Mandarin
2001 (74th)	Amélie	Le Fabuleux Destin d'Amélie Poulain	Aline Bonetto (art direction); Marie-Laure Valla (set decoration)	France; Germany	French
2004 (77th)	A Very Long Engagement	Un long dimanche de fiançailles	Aline Bonetto (art direction)	France; United States	French (some parts in German)
2006 (79th)	Pan's Labyrinth	El laberinto del fauno	Eugenio Caballero (art direction); Pilar Revuelta (set decoration)	Spain; Mexico	Spanish
2018 (91st)	Roma	Roma	Eugenio Caballero (art direction); Bárbara Enríquez (set decoration)	Mexico; United States	Spanish, Mixtec
2019 (92nd)	Parasite	기생충	Lee Ha-Joon (production design); Cho Won-woo (set decoration)	South Korea	Korean
2022 (95th)	All Quiet on the Western Front	Im Westen nichts Neues(German)	Christian M. Goldbeck (production design); Ernestine Hipper (set decoration)	Germany; United States	German (some parts in French)

== Casting ==
The Academy Award for Achievement in Casting was introduced in 2026.

Year	Film title used in nomination	Original title	Award recipient(s)	Country of production	Language(s)	Notes
2025 (98th)	The Secret Agent	O Agente Secreto	Gabriel Domingues	Brazil	Portuguese

== Cinematography ==
The Cinematography category has existed since the creation of the Academy Awards. Until 1938, only one award was given. From 1939 until 1966, two awards were given, one for black-and-white films, the other for color films. The two awards were briefly merged at the 1957 Academy Awards, and were permanently combined once again in a single category starting 1967. However, since foreign language films were not nominated for the Cinematography Award prior to the 1966 Academy Awards, they were unaffected by the splits and mergers that took place in this category.

Year	Film title used in nomination	Original title	Award recipient(s)	Country of production	Language(s)	Notes
1966 (39th)	Is Paris Burning?	Paris brûle-t-il?	Marcel Grignon	France; United States	French, German (some parts), English (some parts)
1973 (46th)	Cries and Whispers	Viskningar och rop	Sven Nykvist	Sweden	Swedish
1982 (55th)	Das Boot	Das Boot	Jost Vacano	(West Germany) Germany (West)	German (some parts in French & English)
1983 (56th)	Fanny and Alexander	Fanny och Alexander	Sven Nykvist	Sweden; France (West Germany) Germany (West)	Swedish (some parts in German, Yiddish & English)
1985 (58th)	Ran	Ran 乱	Takao Saito; Masaharu Ueda; Asakazu Nakai	Japan	Japanese
1993 (66th)	Farewell My Concubine	Bàwáng Bié Jī (pinyin) 霸王別姬 (traditional Chinese) 霸王别姬 (simplified Chinese)	Gu Changwei	China; Hong Kong	Mandarin
1994 (67th)	Red	Trois Couleurs: Rouge	Piotr Sobocinski	France; Switzerland; Poland	French
1995 (68th)	Shanghai Triad	Yáo a yáo, yáo dào wàipó qiáo (pinyin) 摇啊摇，摇到外婆橋 (traditional Chinese) 摇啊摇，摇到外婆桥 (simplified Chinese)	Lü Yue	China	Mandarin
2000 (73rd)	Crouching Tiger, Hidden Dragon	Wòhǔ Cánglóng (pinyin) 臥虎藏龍 (traditional Chinese) 卧虎藏龙 (simplified Chinese)	Peter Pau	Taiwan; China; Hong Kong; United States	Mandarin
2000 (73rd)	Malèna	Malena	Lajos Koltai	Italy	Italian (some parts in Sicilian, English & Latin)
2001 (74th)	Amélie	Le Fabuleux Destin d'Amélie Poulain	Bruno Delbonnel	France; Germany	French
2003 (76th)	City of God	Cidade de Deus	César Charlone	Brazil; France; United States	Brazilian Portuguese
2004 (77th)	House of Flying Daggers	Shí miàn mái fú (pinyin) 十面埋伏 (Chinese)	Zhao Xiaoding	China; Hong Kong	Mandarin
2004 (77th)	The Passion of the Christ	The Passion of the Christ	Caleb Deschanel	United States	Aramaic (some parts in Latin & Hebrew)
2004 (77th)	A Very Long Engagement	Un long dimanche de fiançailles	Bruno Delbonnel	France; United States	French (some parts in German)
2006 (79th)	Pan's Labyrinth	El laberinto del fauno	Guillermo Navarro	Spain; Mexico	Spanish
2007 (80th)	The Diving Bell and the Butterfly	Le Scaphandre et le Papillon	Janusz Kamiński	France; United States	French
2009 (82nd)	The White Ribbon	Das weiße Band	Christian Berger	Germany	German
2013 (86th)	The Grandmaster	Jat Doi Zung Si (pinyin) 一代宗師 (Chinese)	Philippe Le Sourd	Hong Kong; China	Mandarin; Cantonese; Japanese
2014 (87th)	Ida	Ida	Łukasz Żal; Ryszard Lenczewski	Poland; Denmark	Polish
2018 (91st)	Cold War	Zimna wojna	Łukasz Żal	Poland	Polish
2018 (91st)	Never Look Away	Werk ohne Autor	Caleb Deschanel	Germany	German
2018 (91st)	Roma	Roma	Alfonso Cuarón	Mexico	Spanish, Mixtec
2022 (95th)	All Quiet on the Western Front	Im Westen nichts Neues(German)	James Friend	Germany; United States	German (some parts in French)
2022 (95th)	Bardo, False Chronicle of a Handful of Truths	Bardo, falsa crónica de unas cuantas verdades	Darius Khondji	Mexico	Spanish (some parts in English)
2023 (96th)	El Conde	El Conde	Edward Lachman	Chile	Spanish, English, French
2024 (97th)	Emilia Pérez	Emilia Pérez	Paul Guilhaume	France; Mexico; Belgium	Spanish

== Costume Design ==
The Costume Design category has existed since the 1948 Academy Awards. Until 1966, two awards were given, one for black-and-white films, the other for color films. The two awards were briefly merged at the 1957 and 1958 Academy Awards, and were permanently combined once again in a single category starting 1967. All the foreign language films that were nominated for the Costume Design Award between 1948 and 1966 received their nomination in the Black-and-White category, with the exception of Gate of Hell (1953), The Leopard (1963) and Juliet of the Spirits (1965), which were nominated in the Color category.

Year	Film title used in nomination	Original title	Award recipient(s)	Country of production	Language(s)	Notes
1954 (27th)	The Earrings of Madame de...	Madame de...	Georges Annenkov; Rosine Delamare	France	French	^{[A]}
1954 (27th)	Gate of Hell	Jigokumon 地獄門	Sanzo Wada	Japan	Japanese	^{[F]}
1955 (28th)	Ugetsu	Ugetsu monogatari 雨月物語	Tadaoto Kainosho	Japan	Japanese	^{[A]}
1956 (29th)	Seven Samurai	Shichinin no samurai 七人の侍	Kohei Ezaki	Japan	Japanese
1960 (33rd)	Never on Sunday	Pote tin Kyriaki	Denny Vachlioti	Greece; United States	Greek (some parts in English)
1960 (33rd)	The Virgin Spring	Jungfrukällan	Marik Vos	Sweden	Swedish (some parts in German)
1961 (34th)	La Dolce Vita	La dolce vita	Piero Gherardi	Italy	Italian (some parts in English, French & German)
1961 (34th)	Yojimbo	Yojimbo 用心棒	Yoshirō Muraki	Japan	Japanese
1963 (36th)	Federico Fellini's 8½	8 1/2	Piero Gherardi	Italy	Italian (some parts in English, French & German)
1963 (36th)	The Leopard	Il gattopardo	Piero Tosi	Italy	Italian
1966 (39th)	The Gospel According to St. Matthew	Il Vangelo secondo Matteo	Danilo Donati	Italy; France	Italian
1966 (39th)	The Mandrake	The Mandrake	Danilo Donati	Italy; France	Italian
1966 (39th)	Juliet of the Spirits	Giulietta degli spiriti	Piero Gherardi	Italy; France (West Germany) Germany (West)	Italian
1973 (46th)	Cries and Whispers	Viskningar och rop	Marik Vos	Sweden	Swedish
1973 (46th)	Ludwig	Ludwig	Piero Tosi	Italy; France; Germany (West)	Italian (some parts in German & French)
1975 (48th)	The Magic Flute	Trollflöjten	Henny Noremark; Karin Erskine	Sweden	Swedish
1976 (49th)	Fellini's Casanova	Il Casanova di Federico Fellini	Danilo Donati	Italy; United States	Italian (Some parts in French, German, English, Czech, Latin & Hungarian)
1979 (52nd)	La Cage aux Folles	La Cage aux folles	Piero Tosi; Ambra Danon	France	French
1982 (55th)	La Traviata	La Traviata	Piero Tosi	Italy; France	Italian
1983 (56th)	Fanny and Alexander	Fanny och Alexander	Marik Vos	Sweden; France (West Germany) Germany (West)	Swedish (some parts in German, Yiddish & English)
1983 (56th)	The Return of Martin Guerre	Le Retour de Martin Guerre	Anne-Marie Marchand	France	French
1985 (58th)	Ran	Ran 乱	Emi Wada	Japan	Japanese
1986 (59th)	Otello	Otello	Anna Anni; Maurizio Millenotti	Italy	Italian
1990 (63rd)	Cyrano de Bergerac	Cyrano de Bergerac	Franca Squarciapino	France	French
1991 (64th)	Madame Bovary	Madame Bovary	Corinne Jorry	France	French
1994 (67th)	Queen Margot	La Reine Margot	Moidele Bickel	France	French (some parts in Italian)
2000 (73rd)	Crouching Tiger, Hidden Dragon	Wòhǔ Cánglóng (pinyin) 臥虎藏龍 (traditional Chinese) 卧虎藏龙 (simplified Chinese)	Timmy Yip	Taiwan; China; Hong Kong; United States	Mandarin
2006 (79th)	Curse of the Golden Flower	Mǎnchéng Jìndài Huángjīnjiǎ (pinyin) 滿城盡帶黃金甲 (traditional Chinese) 满城尽带黄金甲 (simplified Chinese)	Yee Chung-Man	China; Hong Kong	Mandarin
2007 (80th)	La Vie en rose	La Môme	Marit Allen	France; United Kingdom; Czech Republic	French (some parts in English)
2009 (82nd)	Coco Before Chanel	Coco avant Chanel	Catherine Leterrier	France	French
2010 (83rd)	I Am Love	Io sono l'amore	Antonella Cannarozzi	Italy	Italian
2013 (86th)	The Grandmaster	Jat Doi Zung Si (pinyin) 一代宗師 (Chinese)	William Chang	Hong Kong; China	Mandarin; Cantonese; Japanese
2020 (93rd)	Pinocchio	Pinocchio	Massimo Cantini Parrini	Italy; France; United Kingdom	Italian

== Directing ==
The Directing category has existed since the creation of the Academy Awards. Lina Wertmüller's nomination for Seven Beauties (1976) made her the first-ever woman to be nominated for the Directing Award.

Year	Film title used in nomination	Original title	Award recipient	Country of production	Language(s)	Notes
1960 (33rd)	Never on Sunday	Pote tin Kyriaki	Jules Dassin	Greece; United States	Greek (some parts in English)
1961 (34th)	La Dolce Vita	La dolce vita	Federico Fellini	Italy	Italian (some parts in English, French & German)
1962 (35th)	Divorce Italian Style	Divorzio all'italiana	Pietro Germi	Italy	Italian
1963 (36th)	Federico Fellini's 8½	8½	Federico Fellini	Italy	Italian (some parts in English, French & German)
1965 (38th)	Woman in the Dunes	Suna no onna 砂の女	Hiroshi Teshigahara	Japan	Japanese
1966 (39th)	A Man and a Woman	Un homme et une femme	Claude Lelouch	France	French
1968 (41st)	The Battle of Algiers	La battaglia di Algeri (Italian); La Bataille d'Alger (French)	Gillo Pontecorvo	Italy; Algeria	French (some parts in Arabic, Italian & English)
1969 (42nd)	Z	Z	Costa-Gavras	France; Algeria	French
1970 (43rd)	Fellini Satyricon	Satyricon	Federico Fellini	Italy; France	Italian (some parts in Latin)
1972 (45th)	The Emigrants	Utvandrarna	Jan Troell	Sweden	Swedish
1973 (46th)	Cries and Whispers	Viskningar och rop	Ingmar Bergman	Sweden	Swedish
1974 (47th)	Day for Night	La Nuit américaine	François Truffaut	France; Italy	French (some parts in English)
1975 (48th)	Amarcord	Amarcord	Federico Fellini	Italy	Italian (some parts in Romagnolo)
1976 (49th)	Face to Face	Ansikte mot ansikte	Ingmar Bergman	Sweden	Swedish
1976 (49th)	Seven Beauties	Pasqualino Settebellezze	Lina Wertmüller	Italy	Italian
1979 (52nd)	La Cage aux Folles	La Cage aux folles	Édouard Molinaro	France	French
1982 (55th)	Das Boot	Das Boot	Wolfgang Petersen	(West Germany) Germany (West)	German (some parts in French & English)
1983 (56th)	Fanny and Alexander	Fanny och Alexander	Ingmar Bergman	Sweden; France (West Germany) Germany (West)	Swedish (some parts in German, Yiddish & English)
1985 (58th)	Ran	Ran 乱	Akira Kurosawa	Japan	Japanese
1987 (60th)	My Life as a Dog	Mitt liv som hund	Lasse Hallström	Sweden	Swedish
1994 (67th)	Red	Trois Couleurs: Rouge	Krzysztof Kieślowski	France; Switzerland; Poland	French
1995 (68th)	Il Postino: The Postman	Il postino	Michael Radford	Italy	Italian (some parts in Spanish)
1998 (71st)	Life Is Beautiful	La vita è bella	Roberto Benigni	Italy	Italian (some parts in German & English)
2000 (73rd)	Crouching Tiger, Hidden Dragon	Wòhǔ Cánglóng (pinyin) 臥虎藏龍 (traditional Chinese) 卧虎藏龙 (simplified Chinese)	Ang Lee	Taiwan; China; Hong Kong; United States	Mandarin
2002 (75th)	Talk to Her	Hable con ella	Pedro Almodóvar	Spain	Spanish
2003 (76th)	City of God	Cidade de Deus	Fernando Meirelles	Brazil; France; United States	Brazilian Portuguese
2006 (79th)	Letters from Iwo Jima	Letters from Iwo Jima (English); Iô-Jima kara no tegami 硫黄島からの手紙 (Japanese)	Clint Eastwood	United States	Japanese (some parts in English)
2006 (79th)	Babel	Babel	Alejandro González Iñárritu	United States; Mexico; France	English, Arabic, Spanish, Japanese, Japanese Sign language, Berber languages
2007 (80th)	The Diving Bell and the Butterfly	Le Scaphandre et le Papillon	Julian Schnabel	France; United States	French
2012 (85th)	Amour	Amour	Michael Haneke	Austria; France; Germany	French
2018 (91st)	Cold War	Zimna wojna	Paweł Pawlikowski	Poland	Polish
2018 (91st)	Roma	Roma	Alfonso Cuarón	Mexico	Spanish; Mixtec
2019 (92nd)	Parasite	기생충	Bong Joon-ho	South Korea	Korean
2020 (93rd)	Minari	미나리	Lee Isaac Chung	United States	Korean (some parts in English)
2020 (93rd)	Another Round	Druk (Danish); En runda till (Swedish)	Thomas Vinterberg	Denmark; Netherlands; Sweden	Danish
2021 (94th)	Drive My Car	Doraibu mai kā ドライブ・マイ・カー (Japanese)	Ryusuke Hamaguchi	Japan	Japanese (some parts in English, Korean Sign Language, German, Mandarin, Tagalog, Indonesian, and Korean)
2023 (96th)	Anatomy of a Fall	Anatomie d'une chute (French)	Justine Triet	France	French, English (some parts in German)
2023 (96th)	The Zone of Interest	The Zone of Interest	Jonathan Glazer	United States; United Kingdom; Poland	German (some parts in Polish and Yiddish)
2024 (97th)	Emilia Pérez	Emilia Pérez	Jacques Audiard	France; Mexico; Belgium	Spanish
2025 (98th)	Sentimental Value	Affeksjonsverdi	Joachim Trier	Norway; France; Germany; Denmark; Sweden; United Kingdom	Norwegian, English, Swedish, Danish

== Film Editing ==
The Film Editing category has existed since the 1934 Academy Awards.

Year	Film title used in nomination	Original title	Award recipient	Country of production	Language(s)	Notes
1969 (42nd)	Z	Z	Françoise Bonnot	France; Algeria	French
1982 (55th)	Das Boot	Das Boot	Hannes Nikel	(West Germany) Germany (West)	German (some parts in French & English)
1998 (71st)	Life Is Beautiful	La vita è bella	Simona Paggi	Italy	Italian (some parts in German & English)
2000 (73rd)	Crouching Tiger, Hidden Dragon	Wòhǔ Cánglóng (pinyin) 臥虎藏龍 (traditional Chinese) 卧虎藏龙 (simplified Chinese)	Tim Squyres	Taiwan; China; Hong Kong; United States	Mandarin
2003 (76th)	City of God	Cidade de Deus	Daniel Rezende	Brazil; France; United States	Brazilian Portuguese
2006 (79th)	Babel	Babel	Douglas Crise; Stephen Mirrione	United States; Mexico; France	English, Arabic, Spanish, Japanese, Japanese Sign language, Berber languages
2007 (80th)	The Diving Bell and the Butterfly	Le Scaphandre et le Papillon	Juliette Welfling	France; United States	French
2019 (92nd)	Parasite	기생충	Yang Jin-mo	South Korea	Korean
2023 (96th)	Anatomy of a Fall	Anatomie d'une chute (French)	Laurent Sénéchal	France	French, English (some parts in German)
2024 (97th)	Emilia Pérez	Emilia Pérez	Juliette Welfling	France; Mexico; Belgium	Spanish
2025 (98th)	Sentimental Value	Affeksjonsverdi	Olivier Bugge Coutté	Norway; France; Germany; Denmark; Sweden; United Kingdom	Norwegian, English, Swedish, Danish

== Live Action Short Film ==
The Academy Award for Best Live Action Short Film has been awarded since the 5th Academy Awards, covering the year 1931–32, to present. Until 1956, the category was split multiple times, between Comedy and Novelty, and later, between One-Reel and Two-Reel. In 1957, the categories were merged, presented as Short Subjects, Live Action Subjects until 1970, Short Subjects, Live Action Films from 1971 to 1973, and with its current name since 1974.

Year	Film title used in nomination	Original title	Award recipient(s)	Country of production	Language(s)	Notes
1933 (6th)	The Sea	Morze	Educational Pictures	Poland	Polish
1936 (9th)	La Fiesta de Santa Barbara	La Fiesta de Santa Barbara	Louis Lewyn	United States	English, Spanish
1948 (21st)	Symphony of a City	Människor i stad	Edmund Reek	Sweden	Swedish
1949 (22nd)	Van Gogh	Van Gogh	Gaston Diehl; Robert Haessens	France	French
1951 (24th)	Balzac	Balzac	Les Films du Compass	France	French
1953 (26th)	Herring Hunt	Les Harenguiers	National Film Board of Canada	Canada	English, French
1953 (26th)	Christ Among the Primitives	Cristo Tra i Primitivi	Vincenzo Lucci-Chiarissi	Italy	Italian
1954 (27th)	Beauty and the Bull	Beauty and the Bull	Cedric Francis	United States	English, Spanish
1957 (30th)	A Chairy Tale	Il était une chaise	Norman McLaren	Canada	English, French
1959 (32nd)	The Golden Fish	Histoire d'un poisson rouge	Jacques-Yves Cousteau	France	French
1961 (34th)	Play Ball!	Ballon Vole	Ciné-Documents	France	French
1962 (35th)	Happy Anniversary	Heureux Anniversaire	Pierre Étaix; Jean-Claude Carrière	France	French
1962 (35th)	Pan	Pan	Herman van der Horst	Netherlands	Dutch
1962 (35th)	Big City Blues	Big City Blues	Martina Huguenot van der Linden; Charles Huguenot van der Linden	United States; Netherlands	English, Dutch, German
1963 (36th)	An Occurrence at Owl Creek Bridge	La Rivière du hibou	Paul de Roubaix; Marcel Ichac	France	English, French
1965 (38th)	The Chicken	Le Poulet	Claude Berri	France	French
1965 (38th)	Fortress of Peace	Wehrhafte Schweiz; Nous pouvons nous défendre	Lothar Wolff	Switzerland	German, French, English
1971 (44th)	Sentinels of Silence	Centinelas del silencio	Manuel Arango; Robert Amram	Mexico	Spanish
1974 (47th)	One-Eyed Men Are Kings	Les... borgnes sont rois	Paul Claudon; Edmond Séchan	France	French
1992 (65th)	Omnibus	Omnibus	Sam Karmann	France	French
1993 (66th)	Black Rider	Schwarzfahrer	Pepe Danquart	Germany	German
1993 (66th)	The Screw	La Vis	Didier Flamand	France	French
1996 (69th)	De Tripas, Corazon	De Tripas, Corazon	Antonio Urrutia	Mexico	Spanish
1996 (69th)	Wordless	Senza parole	Bernadette Carranza; Antonello De Leo	Italy	Italian
1996 (69th)	Ernst & Lyset	Ernst & Lyset	Kim Magnusson; Anders Thomas Jensen	Denmark	Danish
1996 (69th)	Esposados	Esposados	Juan Carlos Fresnadillo	Spain	Spanish
1997 (70th)	Sweethearts?	Skal vi være kærester?	Birger Larsen; Thomas Lydholm	Denmark	Danish
1998 (71st)	Election Night	Valgaften	Kim Magnusson; Anders Thomas Jensen	Denmark	Danish
1998 (71st)	The Postcard	La Carte Postale	Vivian Goffette	Belgium	French
1999 (72nd)	Major and Minor Miracles	Stora & små mirakel	Marcus A. Olsson	Sweden	Swedish
1999 (72nd)	Teis and Nico	Bror, Min Bror	Henrik Ruben Genz; Michael W. Horsten	Denmark	Danish
1999 (72nd)	Small Change	Kleingeld	Marc-Andreas Bochert; Gabriele Lins	Germany	German, Japanese, English
2000 (73rd)	Quiero ser (I want to be...)	Quiero ser (I want to be...)	Florian Gallenberger	Mexico; Germany	Spanish
2000 (73rd)	One Day Crossing	One Day Crossing	Joan Stein; Christina Lazaridi	Hungary; United States	Hungarian
2000 (73rd)	A Soccer Story	Uma Historia de Futebol	Paulo Machline	Brazil	Portuguese
2001 (74th)	Gregor's Greatest Invention	Gregors größte Erfindung	Johannes Kiefer	Germany	German
2001 (74th)	A Man Thing	Meska Sprawa	Sławomir Fabicki; Bogumil Godfrejow	Poland	Polish
2002 (75th)	This Charming Man	Der Er En Yndig Mand	Martin Strange-Hansen; Mie Andreasen	Denmark	Danish
2002 (75th)	J'attendrai le suivant... (I'll Wait for the Next One...)	J'attendrai le suivant	Philippe Orreindy; Thomas Gaudin	France	French
2002 (75th)	Gridlock	Fait d'hiver	Dirk Beliën; Anja Daelemans	Belgium	Dutch
2002 (75th)	Dog	Inja	Steven Pasvolsky; Joe Weatherstone	Australia; South Africa	Akrikaans, English
2003 (76th)	The Bridge	Most	Bobby Garabedian; William Zabka	Czech Republic	English, Czech
2003 (76th)	Squash	Squash	Lionel Bailliu	France	French
2003 (76th)	The Red Jacket	Die Rote Jacke	Florian Baxmeyer	Germany	German, Serbo-Croatian, English
2003 (76th)	(A) Torsion	(A) Torzija	Stefan Arsenijević	Slovenia	Serbo-Croatian
2004 (77th)	7:35 in the Morning	7:35 de la Mañana	Nacho Vigalondo	Spain	Spanish
2004 (77th)	Little Terrorist	Little Terrorist	Ashvin Kumar	India	Hindi, Urdu, Bangla
2004 (77th)	Two Cars, One Night	Two Cars, One Night	Taika Waititi; Ainsley Gardiner	New Zealand	English, Maori
2005 (78th)	The Runaway	Ausreißer	Ulrike Grote	Germany	German
2005 (78th)	Cashback	Cashback	Sean Ellis; Lene Bausager	United Kingdom	English, Spanish
2005 (78th)	The Last Farm	Síðasti bærinn	Rúnar Rúnarsson; Thor S. Sigurjónsson	Iceland	Icelandic
2006 (79th)	Binta and the Great Idea	Binta y la Gran Idea	Javier Fesser; Luis Manso	Spain	Diola, French
2006 (79th)	Helmer & Son	Helmer & Son	Søren Pilmark; Kim Magnusson	Denmark	Danish
2006 (79th)	One Too Many	Éramos pocos	Borja Cobeaga	Spain	Spanish
2007 (80th)	The Mozart of Pickpockets	Le Mozart des pickpockets	Philippe Pollet-Villard	France	French
2007 (80th)	At Night	Om natten	Christian E. Christiansen; Louise Vesth	Denmark	Danish
2007 (80th)	The Substitute	Il Supplente	Andrea Jublin	Italy	Danish
2007 (80th)	Tanghi Argentini	Tanghi Argentini	Guido Thys; Anja Daelemans	Belgium	Dutch
2008 (81st)	Toyland	Spielzeugland	Jochen Alexander Freydank	Germany	German
2008 (81st)	On the Line	Auf der Strecke	Reto Caffi	Switzerland; Germany	German
2008 (81st)	Manon on the Asphalt	Manon sur le bitume	Elizabeth Marre; Olivier Pont	France	French
2008 (81st)	The Pig	Grisen	Tivi Magnusson; Dorte Høgh	Denmark	Danish
2009 (82nd)	The Door	The Door	Juanita Wilson; James Flynn	(Republic of Ireland) Ireland	Russian
2009 (82nd)	Instead of Abracadabra	Istället för Abrakadabra	Patrik Eklund; Mathias Fjellström	Sweden	Swedish
2009 (82nd)	Kavi	Kavi	Gregg Helvey	United States; India	Hindi
2010 (83rd)	Na Wewe (You Too)	Na Wewe	Ivan Goldschmidt	Belgium	French, Kirundi, Flemish
2011 (84th)	Raju	Raju	Max Zähle; Stefan Gieren	Germany; India	German, English
2012 (85th)	Buzkashi Boys	Buzkashi Boys	Sam French; Ariel Nasr	Afghanistan; United States	Dari
2012 (85th)	Death of a Shadow	Dood van een Schaduw	Tom Van Avermaet; Ellen De Waele	Belgium	Dutch
2012 (85th)	Henry	Henry	Yan England	Canada	French
2013 (86th)	Helium	Helium	Anders Walter; Kim Magnusson	Denmark	Danish
2013 (86th)	That Wasn't Me	Aquél no era yo	Esteban Crespo	Spain	Spanish
2013 (86th)	Just Before Losing Everything	Avant que de tout perdre	Xavier Legrand; Alexandre Gavras	France	French
2013 (86th)	Do I Have to Take Care of Everything?	Pitääkö mun kaikki hoitaa?	Selma Vilhunen; Kirsikka Saari	Finland	Finnish
2014 (87th)	Aya	Aya	Oded Binnun; Mihal Brezis	France; Israel	English, Hebrew
2014 (87th)	Butter Lamp	La lampe au beurre de yak	Hu Wei; Julien Féret	China; France	Tibetan
2014 (87th)	Parvaneh	Parvaneh	Talkhon Hamzavi; Stefan Eichenberger	Switzerland	German
2015 (88th)	Ave Maria	Ave Maria	Basil Khalil; Eric Dupont	France; Germany; Palestine	Arabic, English, Hebrew
2015 (88th)	Day One	Day One	Henry Hughes	United States	English, Dari
2015 (88th)	Everything Will Be Okay	Alles wird gut	Patrick Vollrath	Austria; Germany	German
2015 (88th)	Shok	Shok	Jamie Donoughue	Kosovo; United Kingdom	Albanian, Serbian
2016 (89th)	Sing	Mindenki	Kristóf Deák; Anna Udvardy	Hungary	Hungarian
2016 (89th)	Ennemis intérieurs	Ennemis intérieurs	Sélim Azzazi	France	French
2016 (89th)	La femme et le TGV	La femme et le TGV	Timo von Gunten; Giacun Caduff	Switzerland	German
2016 (89th)	Timecode	Timecode	Juanjo Giménez	Spain	Spanish
2017 (90th)	Watu Wote: All of Us	Watu Wote	Katja Benrath; Tobias Rosen	Germany; Kenya	Swahili, Somali
2018 (91st)	Fauve	Fauve	Jérémy Comte; Maria Gracia Turgeon	Canada	French
2018 (91st)	Marguerite	Marguerite	Marianne Farley; Marie-Hélène Panisset	Canada	French
2018 (91st)	Mother	Madre	Rodrigo Sorogoyen; María del Puy Alvarado	Spain	Spanish
2019 (92nd)	Brotherhood	Brotherhood	Meryam Joobeur; Maria Gracia Turgeon	Canada; Tunisia; Qatar; Sweden	Arabic
2019 (92nd)	Nefta Football Club	Nefta Football Club	Yves Piat; Damien Megherbi	France; Tunisia; Algeria	Arabic
2019 (92nd)	Saria	Saria	Bryan Buckley; Matt Lefrebvre	United States	Spanish
2019 (92nd)	A Sister	Une soeur	Delphine Girard	Belgium	French
2020 (93rd)	The Present	الهدية	Farah Nabulsi	Palestine	Arabic, English
2020 (93rd)	White Eye	White Eye	Tomer Shushan; Shira Hochman	Israel	Hebrew
2021 (94th)	Ala Kachuu – Take and Run	Ala Kachuu – Take and Run	Maria Brendle; Nadine Lüchinger	Switzerland	Kirgyz
2021 (94th)	The Dress	Sukienka	Tadeusz Łysiak; Maciej Ślesicki	Poland	Polish
2021 (94th)	On My Mind	On My Mind	Martin Strange-Hansen; Kim Magnusson	Denmark	Danish
2022 (95th)	Le pupille	Le pupille	Alice Rohrwacher; Alfonso Cuarón	Italy	Italian
2022 (95th)	Night Ride	Nattrikken	Eirik Tveiten; Gaute Lid Larssen	Norway	Norwegian
2022 (95th)	The Red Suitcase	La Valise rouge	Cyrus Neshvad	Luxembourg	Persian, English, Luxembourgish, French
2022 (95th)	Ivalu	Ivalu	Anders Walter; Rebecca Pruzan	Denmark	Greenlandic
2023 (96th)	Invincible	Invincible	Vincent René-Lortie; Samuel Caron	Canada	French
2023 (96th)	Knight of Fortune	Ridder Lykke	Lasse Lyskjær Noer; Christian Norlyk	Denmark	Danish
2024 (97th)	I'm Not a Robot	Ik ben geen robot	Victoria Warmerdam; Trent	Belgium; Netherlands	Dutch
2024 (97th)	Anuja	अनुजा	Adam J. Graves; Suchitra Mattai	United States	Hindi
2024 (97th)	The Last Ranger	The Last Ranger	Cindy Lee; Darwin Shaw	United States; South Africa	English, Xhosa
2024 (97th)	The Man Who Could Not Remain Silent	Čovjek koji nije mogao šutjeti	Nebojša Slijepčević; Danijel Pek	Croatia; France; Slovenia; Bulgaria	Croatian
2025 (98th)	Two People Exchanging Saliva	Deux personnes échangeant de la salive	Alexandre Singh; Natalie Musteata	France; United States	French	^{[G]}
2025 (98th)	Butcher's Stain	כתם קצבים	Meyer Levinson-Blount; Oron Caspi	Israel	Hebrew, Arabic

== Makeup ==
The Makeup category has existed since the 1981 Academy Awards. No award was handed out at the 1983 Academy Awards.

Year	Film title used in nomination	Original title	Award recipient(s)	Country of production	Language(s)	Notes
1982 (55th)	Quest for Fire	La Guerre du feu	Michèle Burke; Sarah Monzani	France; Canada	Special prehistoric languages created by Anthony Burgess (combined with body language and gestures created by Desmond Morris)
1990 (63rd)	Cyrano de Bergerac	Cyrano de Bergerac	Michèle Burke; Jean-Pierre Eychenne	France	French
2004 (77th)	The Passion of the Christ	The Passion of the Christ	Keith Vanderlaan; Christien Tinsley	United States	Aramaic (some parts in Latin & Hebrew)
2004 (77th)	The Sea Inside	Mar adentro	Jo Allen; Manuel García	Spain; France; Italy	Spanish (some parts in Catalan & Galician)
2006 (79th)	Apocalypto	Apocalypto	Aldo Signoretti; Vittorio Sodano	United States	Yucatec Maya
2006 (79th)	Pan's Labyrinth	El laberinto del fauno	David Martí; Montse Ribé	Spain; Mexico	Spanish
2007 (80th)	La Vie en rose	La Môme	Didier Lavergne; Jan Archibald	France; United Kingdom; Czech Republic	French (some parts in English)
2009 (82nd)	Il Divo	Il Divo	Aldo Signoretti; Vittorio Sodano	Italy; France	Italian
2015 (88th)	The Hundred-Year-Old Man Who Climbed Out of the Window and Disappeared	Hundraåringen som klev ut genom fönstret och försvann	Love Larson; Eva von Bahr	Sweden	Swedish (some parts in English, Russian, German, French and Spanish)
2016 (89th)	A Man Called Ove	En man som heter Ove	Love Larson; Eva von Bahr	Sweden	Swedish
2018 (91st)	Border	Gräns	Göran Lundström; Pamela Goldammer	Sweden	Swedish
2020 (93rd)	Pinocchio	Pinocchio	Dalia Colli; Mark Coulier; Francesco Pegoretti	Italy; France; United Kingdom	Italian
2022 (95th)	All Quiet on the Western Front	Im Westen nichts Neues	Heike Merker; Linda Eisenhamerová	Germany; United States	German (some parts in French)
2023 (96th)	Society of the Snow	La sociedad de la nieve	Ana López-Puigcerver; David Martí; Montse Ribé	Spain; United States	Spanish
2024 (97th)	Emilia Pérez	Emilia Pérez	Julia Floch-Carbonel; Emmanuel Janvier; Jean-Christophe Spadaccini	France; Mexico; Belgium	Spanish
2025 (98th)	Kokuho	国宝	Kyoko Toyokawa; Naomi Hibino; Tadashi Nishimatsu	Japan	Japanese
2025 (98th)	The Ugly Stepsister	Den Stygge Stesøsteren	Thomas Foldberg; Anne Cathrine Sauerberg	Norway Poland Sweden Denmark	Norwegian

== Music (Scoring) ==
The Music (Scoring) category.

Year	Film title used in nomination	Original title	Award recipient(s)	Country of production	Language(s)	Notes
1961 (34th)	Khovanshchina	Khovanshchina; Хованщина	Dimitri Shostakovich (Scoring of a Musical Picture)	Soviet Union	Russian
1963 (36th)	Sundays and Cybele	Les Dimanches de Ville d'Avray	Maurice Jarre (Scoring of Music — adaptation or treatment)	France	French
1965 (38th)	The Umbrellas of Cherbourg	Les Parapluies de Cherbourg	Michel Legrand; Jacques Demy (Music Score — substantially original)	France	French
1965 (38th)	The Umbrellas of Cherbourg	Les Parapluies de Cherbourg	Michel Legrand (Scoring of Music — adaptation or treatment)	France	French
1966 (39th)	The Gospel According to St. Matthew	Il Vangelo secondo Matteo	Luis Bacalov (Scoring of Music — adaptation or treatment)	Italy; France	Italian
1968 (41st)	The Young Girls of Rochefort	Les Demoiselles de Rochefort	Michel Legrand (Music and adaptation score); Jacques Demy (Lyrics)(Score of a Musical Picture-original or adaptation)	France	French (some parts in English)
1970 (43rd)	Sunflower	I girasoli	Henry Mancini (Original Score)	Italy; France	Italian (some parts in English)
1971 (44th)	Tchaikovsky	Chaykovskiy; Чайковский	Dimitri Tiomkin (Adaptation and Original Song Score)	Soviet Union	Russian
1995 (68th)	Il Postino: The Postman	Il postino	Luis Bacalov (Original Dramatic Score)	Italy	Italian (some parts in Spanish)
1998 (71st)	Life Is Beautiful	La vita è bella	Nicola Piovani (Original Dramatic Score)	Italy	Italian (some parts in German & English)
1999 (72nd)	The Red Violin	Le Violon rouge	John Corigliano (Original Score)	Canada; Italy	Multilingual (English, French, German, Italian & Mandarin)
2000 (73rd)	Crouching Tiger, Hidden Dragon	Wòhǔ Cánglóng (pinyin) 臥虎藏龍 (traditional Chinese) 卧虎藏龙 (simplified Chinese)	Tan Dun (Original Score)	Taiwan; China; Hong Kong; United States	Mandarin
2000 (73rd)	Malèna	Malena	Ennio Morricone (Original Score)	Italy	Italian (some parts in Sicilian, English & Latin)
2004 (77th)	The Passion of the Christ	The Passion of the Christ	John Debney (Original Score)	United States	Aramaic (some parts in Latin & Hebrew)
2006 (79th)	Babel	Babel	Gustavo Santaolalla	United States; Mexico; France	English, Arabic, Spanish, Japanese, Japanese Sign language, Berber languages
2006 (79th)	Pan's Labyrinth	El laberinto del fauno	Javier Navarrete (Original Score)	Spain; Mexico	Spanish
2007 (80th)	The Kite Runner	The Kite Runner	Alberto Iglesias (Original Score)	United States	Dari (some parts in English, Pashtu, Urdu & Russian)
2020 (93rd)	Minari	미나리	Emile Mosseri (Original Score)	United States	Korean (some parts in English)
2021 (94th)	Parallel Mothers	Madres paralelas	Alberto Iglesias (Original Score)	Spain	Spanish
2022 (95th)	All Quiet on the Western Front	Im Westen nichts Neues(German)	Volker Bertelmann (Original Score)	Germany; United States	German (some parts in French)
2024 (97th)	Emilia Pérez	Emilia Pérez	Clément Ducol; Camille (Original score)	France; Mexico; Belgium	Spanish

== Music (Best Original Song) ==
The Music (Best Original Song) category has existed since the 1934 Academy Awards. Its name was changed from Song to Original Song starting 1975 onwards. The designation Song — Original for the Picture had previously been used between 1968 and 1972. This list includes all nominated non-English language songs, regardless of their respective original film's primary language.

Year	Film title used in nomination	Original title	Song	Award recipient(s)	Country of production	Language(s)	Notes
1960 (33rd)	Never on Sunday	Pote tin Kyriaki	"Ta paidia tou Peiraia"	Manos Hatzidakis (Music & Lyric)	Greece; United States	Greek (some parts in English)
1965 (38th)	The Umbrellas of Cherbourg	Les Parapluies de Cherbourg	"I Will Wait For You"	Michel Legrand (Music); Jacques Demy (Lyrics); Norman Gimbel (English Lyrics)	France	French
2000 (73rd)	Crouching Tiger, Hidden Dragon	Wòhǔ Cánglóng (pinyin) 臥虎藏龍 (traditional Chinese) 卧虎藏龙 (simplified Chinese)	"A Love Before Time"	Jorge Calandrelli; Tan Dun (Music); James Schamus (Lyric)	Taiwan; China; Hong Kong; United States	Mandarin
2003 (76th)	The Triplets of Belleville	Les Triplettes de Belleville	"Belleville Rendez-vous"	Benoît Charest (Music); Sylvain Chomet (Lyric)	France; Belgium; Canada; United Kingdom	French
2004 (77th)	The Motorcycle Diaries	Diarios de motocicleta	"Al otro lado del río"	Jorge Drexler (Music & Lyric)	Argentina; United States; Chile; Peru; Brazil (United Kingdom) UK; Germany; France	Spanish (some parts in Quechua)
2004 (77th)	The Chorus (Les Choristes)	Les Choristes	"Look To Your Path (Vois Sur Ton Chemin)"	Bruno Coulais (Music); Christophe Barratier (Lyric)	France; Switzerland; Germany	French
2008 (81st)	Slumdog Millionaire	Slumdog Millionaire	"Jai Ho"	A. R. Rahman (Music); Gulzar (Lyric)	United Kingdom; United States	Hindi
2008 (81st)	Slumdog Millionaire	Slumdog Millionaire	"O Saya"	A. R. Rahman (Music & Lyric); M.I.A. (Music & Lyric)	United Kingdom; United States	Hindi
2009 (82nd)	Paris 36	Faubourg 36	"Loin de Paname"	Reinhardt Wagner (Music); Frank Thomas (Lyric)	France; Germany; Czech Republic	French
2012 (85th)	Life of Pi	Life of Pi	"Pi's Lullaby"	Mychael Danna (Music); Bombay Jayashri (Lyric)	Taiwan; United Kingdom; United States; India; France; Canada	Tamil
2020 (93rd)	The Life Ahead	La vita davanti a sé	"Io sì (Seen)"	Diane Warren (Music & Lyric); Laura Pausini (Lyric)	Italy	Italian
2021 (94th)	Encanto	Encanto	"Dos Oruguitas"	Lin-Manuel Miranda (Music & Lyric)	United States	Spanish
2022 (95th)	RRR	RRR	"Naatu Naatu"	M.M. Keeravani (Music); Chandrabose (Lyric)	India	Telugu
2023 (96th)	Killers of the Flower Moon	Killers of the Flower Moon	"Wahzhazhe (A Song for My People)"	George Scott (Music & Lyric)	United States	Osage
2024 (97th)	Emilia Pérez	Emilia Pérez	"El Mal"	Clément Ducol (Music & Lyric); Camille (Music & Lyric); Jacques Audiard (Lyric)	France; Mexico; Belgium	Spanish
2024 (97th)	Emilia Pérez	Emilia Pérez	"Mi Camino"	Clément Ducol (Music & Lyric); Camille (Music & Lyric)	France; Mexico; Belgium	Spanish

== Sound Mixing ==
The Sound Mixing category existed from 1930 through 2019, after which it and the Sound Editing category were combined into a single award for Best Sound.

Year	Film title used in nomination	Original title	Award recipient(s)	Country of production	Language(s)	Notes
1982 (55th)	Das Boot	Das Boot	Milan Bor; Trevor Pyke; Mike Le Mare	(West Germany) Germany (West)	German (some parts in French & English)
2001 (74th)	Amélie	Le Fabuleux Destin d'Amélie Poulain	Vincent Arnardi; Guillaume Leriche; Jean Umansky	France; Germany	French
2006 (79th)	Apocalypto	Apocalypto	Kevin O'Connell; Greg P. Russell; Fernando Cámara	United States	Mayan
2018 (91st)	Roma	Roma	Skip Lievsay; Craig Henighan; José Antonio García	Mexico	Spanish, Mixtec
2022 (95th)	All Quiet on the Western Front	Im Westen nichts Neues(German)	Viktor Prasil; Frank Kruse; Markus Stemler; Lars Ginzel; Stefan Korte (Best Sound)	Germany; United States	German (some parts in French)
2023 (96th)	The Zone of Interest	The Zone of Interest	Johnnie Burn and Tarn Willers	United States; United Kingdom; Poland	German (some parts in Polish and Yiddish)
2024 (97th)	Emilia Pérez	Emilia Pérez	Erwan Kerzanet; Maxence Dussère; Niels Baretta	France; Mexico; Belgium	Spanish
2025 (98th)	Sirāt	Sirāt	Amanda Villavieja; Laia Casanovas; Yasmina Praderas	Spain; France	Spanish, French, Arabic

== Sound Editing ==
The Sound Editing category existed from 1963 through 2019, after which it and the Sound Mixing category were combined into a single award for Best Sound.

Year	Film title used in nomination	Original title	Award recipient(s)	Country of production	Language(s)	Notes
1982 (55th)	Das Boot	Das Boot	Mike Le Mare	(West Germany) Germany (West)	German (some parts in French & English)
2006 (79th)	Apocalypto	Apocalypto	Kami Asgar; Sean McCormack	United States	Mayan
2006 (79th)	Letters from Iwo Jima	Letters from Iwo Jima	Bub Asman; Alan Robert Murray	United States	Japanese (some parts in English)
2018 (91st)	Roma	Roma	Skip Lievsay; Sergio Diaz	Mexico	Spanish, Mixtec

== Visual Effects ==
The Visual Effects category has existed since 1928.

Year	Film title used in nomination	Original title	Award recipient(s)	Country of production	Language(s)	Notes
1971 (44th)	When Dinosaurs Ruled the Earth	When Dinosaurs Ruled the Earth	Jim Danforth; Roger Dicken	United Kingdom	Aboriginal (some parts in English)
2022 (95th)	All Quiet on the Western Front	Im Westen nichts Neues	Frank Petzold; Viktor Muller; Markus Frank; Kamil Jafar	Germany; United States	German (some parts in French)
2023 (96th)	Godzilla Minus One	Gojira Mainasu Wan ゴジラ-1.0	Takashi Yamazaki; Kiyoko Shibuya; Masaki Takahashi; Tatsuji Nojima	Japan	Japanese

== Writing (Adapted Screenplay) ==
The Adapted Screenplay category has existed since the creation of the awards.

Year	Film title used in nomination	Original title	Award recipient(s)	Country of production	Language(s)	Notes
1949 (22nd)	The Bicycle Thief	Ladri di biciclette	Cesare Zavattini	Italy	Italian
1951 (24th)	La Ronde	La Ronde	Jacques Natanson; Max Ophüls	France	French
1954 (27th)	Forbidden Games	Jeux interdits	François Boyer	France	French
1963 (36th)	Sundays and Cybele	Les Dimanches de Ville d'Avray	Serge Bourguignon; Bernard Eschassériaux	France	French
1969 (42nd)	Z	Z	Costa-Gavras; Jorge Semprún	France; Algeria	French
1971 (44th)	The Conformist	Il conformista	Bernardo Bertolucci	Italy; France; Germany (West)	Italian (Some parts in French & Latin)
1971 (44th)	The Garden of the Finzi-Continis	Il giardino dei Finzi-Contini	Vittorio Bonicelli; Ugo Pirro	Italy; Germany (West)	Italian
1972 (45th)	The Emigrants	Utvandrarna	Bengt Forslund; Jan Troell	Sweden	Swedish
1975 (48th)	Scent of a Woman	Profumo di donna	Ruggero Maccari; Dino Risi	Italy	Italian
1976 (49th)	Fellini's Casanova	Il Casanova di Federico Fellini	Federico Fellini; Bernardino Zapponi	Italy; United States	Italian (Some parts in French, German, English, Czech, Latin & Hungarian)
1977 (50th)	That Obscure Object of Desire	Cet obscur objet du désir (French); Ese oscuro objeto del deseo (Spanish)	Luis Buñuel; Jean-Claude Carrière	France; Spain	French (Some parts in Spanish)
1979 (52nd)	La Cage aux Folles	La Cage aux folles	Marcello Danon; Édouard Molinaro; Jean Poiret; Francis Veber	France	French
1982 (55th)	Das Boot	Das Boot	Wolfgang Petersen	(West Germany) Germany (West)	German (some parts in French & English)
1987 (60th)	My Life as a Dog	Mitt liv som hund	Brasse Brännström; Per Berglund; Lasse Hallström; Reidar Jönsson	Sweden	Swedish
1991 (64th)	Europa Europa	Hitlerjunge Salomon	Agnieszka Holland	Germany; France; Poland	German (some parts in Russian, Polish & Hebrew)
1995 (68th)	The Postman (Il Postino)	Il postino	Anna Pavignano; Michael Radford; Furio Scarpelli; Giacomo Scarpelli; Massimo Troisi	Italy	Italian (some parts in Spanish)
2000 (73rd)	Crouching Tiger, Hidden Dragon	Wòhǔ Cánglóng (pinyin) 臥虎藏龍 (traditional Chinese) 卧虎藏龙 (simplified Chinese)	James Schamus; Kuo Jung Tsai; Hui-Ling Wang	Taiwan; China; Hong Kong; United States	Mandarin
2003 (76th)	City of God	Cidade de Deus	Bráulio Mantovani	Brazil; France; United States	Brazilian Portuguese
2004 (77th)	The Motorcycle Diaries	Diarios de motocicleta	José Rivera	Argentina; United States; Chile; Peru; Brazil (United Kingdom) UK; Germany; France	Spanish (some parts in Quechua)
2007 (80th)	The Diving Bell and the Butterfly	Le Scaphandre et le Papillon	Ronald Harwood	France; United States	French
2021 (94th)	Drive My Car	Doraibu mai kā ドライブ・マイ・カー (Japanese)	Ryusuke Hamaguchi; Takamasa Oe	Japan	Japanese (some parts in English, Korean Sign Language, German, Mandarin, Tagalog, Indonesian, and Korean)
2022 (95th)	All Quiet on the Western Front	Im Westen nichts Neues(German)	Edward Berger; Lesley Paterson; Ian Stokell	Germany; United States	German (some parts in French)
2023 (96th)	The Zone of Interest	The Zone of Interest	Jonathan Glazer	United States; United Kingdom; Poland	German (some parts in Polish and Yiddish)
2024 (97th)	Emilia Pérez	Emilia Pérez	Jacques Audiard; Léa Mysius	France; Mexico; Belgium	Spanish

== Writing (Original Screenplay) ==
The Original Screenplay category has existed since 1940.

Year	Film title used in nomination	Original title	Award recipient(s)	Country of production	Language(s)	Notes
1945 (18th)	Marie-Louise	Marie-Louise	Richard Schweizer	Switzerland	Swiss German
1946 (19th)	Open City	Roma, città aperta	Sergio Amidei; Federico Fellini	Italy	Italian (Some parts in German) (In this year the category screenplay had both original and adapted screenplays).
1946 (19th)	Children of Paradise	Les Enfants du Paradis	Jacques Prévert	France	French
1947 (20th)	A Cage of Nightingales	La Cage aux Rossignols	Georges Chaperot; René Wheeler	France	French
1947 (20th)	Shoeshine	Sciuscià	Sergio Amidei; Adolfo Franci; Cesare Giulio Viola; Cesare Zavattini; Roberto Rossellini	Italy	Italian
1949 (22nd)	Paisà	Paisà	Alfred Hayes; Federico Fellini; Sergio Amidei; Marcello Pagliero; Roberto Rossellini	Italy	Italian
1950 (23rd)	Bitter Rice	Riso amaro	Giuseppe De Santis; Carlo Lizzani	Italy	Italian
1954 (27th)	Bread, Love and Dreams	Pane, amore e fantasia	Ettore Maria Margadonna	Italy	Italian
1955 (28th)	Mr. Hulot's Holiday	Les Vacances de monsieur Hulot	Jacques Tati; Henri Marquet	France	French
1955 (28th)	The Sheep Has Five Legs	Le mouton à cinq pattes	Jean Marsan; Henri Troyat; Jacques Perret; Henri Verneuil; Raoul Ploquin	France	French
1956 (29th)	The Red Balloon	Le Ballon rouge	Albert Lamorisse	France	French
1956 (29th)	La Strada	La strada	Federico Fellini; Tullio Pinelli	Italy	Italian
1956 (29th)	Umberto D.	Umberto D.	Cesare Zavattini	Italy	Italian
1956 (29th)	The Proud and the Beautiful	Les orgueilleux	Jean-Paul Sartre	France; Mexico	French, Spanish
1957 (30th)	I Vitelloni	I vitelloni	Federico Fellini; Ennio Flaiano; Tullio Pinelli	Italy; France	Italian
1959 (32nd)	The 400 Blows	Les Quatre Cents Coups	François Truffaut; Marcel Moussy	France	French
1959 (32nd)	Wild Strawberries	Smultronstället	Ingmar Bergman	Sweden	Swedish; Latin
1960 (33rd)	Never on Sunday	Pote tin Kyriaki	Jules Dassin	Greece; United States	Greek (Some parts in English)
1960 (33rd)	Hiroshima Mon Amour	Hiroshima mon amour	Marguerite Duras	France; Japan	French; Japanese; English
1961 (34th)	Ballad of a Soldier	Баллада о солдате	Valentin Yezhov; Grigori Chukhrai	Soviet Union	Russian
1961 (34th)	La Dolce Vita	La dolce vita	Federico Fellini; Ennio Flaiano; Tullio Pinelli; Brunello Rondi	Italy; France	Italian; English; French; German
1961 (34th)	General della Rovere	Il generale della Rovere	Sergio Amidei; Diego Fabbri; Indro Montanelli	Italy; France	Italian; German
1962 (35th)	Divorce Italian Style	Divorzio all'italiana	Ennio De Concini; Pietro Germi; Alfredo Giannetti	Italy	Italian
1962 (35th)	Last Year at Marienbad	L'Année dernière à Marienbad	Alain Robbe-Grillet	France	French
1962 (35th)	Through a Glass Darkly	Såsom i en spegel	Ingmar Bergman	Sweden	Swedish
1963 (36th)	8½	8½	Federico Fellini; Ennio Flaiano; Tullio Pinelli; Brunello Rondi	Italy	Italian; English; French; German
1963 (36th)	The Four Days of Naples	Le quattro giornate di Napoli	Pasquale Festa Campanile; Massimo Franciosa; Nanni Loy; Vasco Pratolini; Carlo Bernari	Italy	Italian
1964 (37th)	The Organizer	I compagni	Agenore Incrocci; Furio Scarpelli; Mario Monicelli	Italy	Italian
1964 (37th)	That Man From Rio	L'Homme de Rio	Jean Paul Rappeneau; Ariane Mnouchkine; Daniel Boulanger; Philippe de Broca	France; Italy	French
1965 (38th)	Casanova 70	Casanova '70	Agenore Incrocci; Furio Scarpelli; Mario Monicelli; Tonino Guerra; Giorgio Salvioni; Suso Cecchi D'Amico	Italy	Italian
1965 (38th)	The Umbrellas of Cherbourg	Les Parapluies de Cherbourg	Jacques Demy	France	French
1966 (39th)	A Man and a Woman	Un homme et une femme	Claude Lelouch	France	French
1967 (40th)	The War is Over	La guerre est finie	Jorge Semprún	France	French
1968 (41st)	The Battle of Algiers	La battaglia di Algeri	Franco Solinas; Gillo Pontecorvo	Italy; Algeria	French; Arabic
1969 (42nd)	The Damned	La caduta degli dei	Nicola Badalucco; Enrico Medioli; Luchino Visconti	Italy; Germany (West)	Italian; German
1970 (43rd)	My Night at Maud's	Ma nuit chez Maud	Éric Rohmer	France	French
1971 (44th)	Investigation of a Citizen Above Suspicion	Indagine su un cittadino al di sopra di ogni sospetto	Elio Petri; Ugo Pirro	Italy	Italian
1972 (45th)	The Discreet Charm of the Bourgeoisie	Le charme discret de la bourgeoisie	Luis Buñuel; Jean-Claude Carrière	France; Italy; Spain	French (Some parts in Spanish)
1972 (45th)	Murmur of the Heart	Le souffle au coeur	Louis Malle	France; Italy; Germany (West)	French
1973 (46th)	Cries and Whispers	Viskningar och rop	Ingmar Bergman	Sweden	Swedish
1974 (47th)	Day for Night	La Nuit américaine	François Truffaut; Jean-Louis Richard; Suzanne Schiffman	France; Italy	French (some parts in English)
1975 (48th)	Amarcord	Amarcord	Federico Fellini; Tonino Guerra	Italy	Italian (some parts in Romagnolo)
1975 (48th)	And Now My Love	Toute une vie	Claude Lelouch; Pierre Uytterhoeven	France; Italy	French (some parts in English)
1976 (49th)	Cousin, Cousine	Cousin cousine	Jean-Charles Tacchella; Daniele Thompson	France	French
1976 (49th)	Seven Beauties	Pasqualino Settebellezze	Lina Wertmüller	Italy	Italian (some parts in German)
1978 (51st)	Autumn Sonata	Höstsonaten	Ingmar Bergman	France (West Germany) Germany (West); Sweden	Swedish (some parts in English)
1980 (53rd)	Mon Oncle D'Amerique	Mon oncle d'Amérique	Jean Gruault	France	French
1983 (56th)	Fanny and Alexander	Fanny och Alexander	Ingmar Bergman	Sweden; France (West Germany) Germany (West)	Swedish (some parts in German, Yiddish & English)
1984 (57th)	El Norte	El Norte	Gregory Nava; Anna Thomas	United States; United Kingdom	Spanish (some parts in Maya & English)
1985 (58th)	The Official Story	La historia oficial	Aida Bortnik; Luis Puenzo	Argentina	Spanish (some parts in English)
1987 (60th)	Au Revoir Les Enfants (Goodbye, Children)	Au revoir, les enfants	Louis Malle	France; Germany (West)	French (some parts in German & English)
1994 (67th)	Red	Trois Couleurs: Rouge	Krzysztof Kieślowski; Krzysztof Piesiewicz	France; Switzerland; Poland	French
1998 (71st)	Life Is Beautiful	La vita è bella	Roberto Benigni; Vincenzo Cerami	Italy	Italian (some parts in German & English)
2001 (74th)	Amélie	Le Fabuleux Destin d'Amélie Poulain	Jean-Pierre Jeunet; Guillaume Laurant	France; Germany	French
2002 (75th)	Talk to Her	Hable con ella	Pedro Almodóvar	Spain	Spanish
2002 (75th)	Y Tu Mamá También	Y tu mamá también	Alfonso Cuarón; Carlos Cuarón	Mexico	Spanish
2003 (76th)	The Barbarian Invasions	Les Invasions barbares	Denys Arcand	Canada; France	French (some parts in English)
2006 (79th)	Letters from Iwo Jima	Letters from Iwo Jima (English); Iô-Jima kara no tegami 硫黄島からの手紙 (Japanese)	Paul Haggis; Iris Yamashita	United States	Japanese (some parts in English)
2006 (79th)	Pan's Labyrinth	El laberinto del fauno	Guillermo del Toro	Spain; Mexico	Spanish
2006 (79th)	Babel	Babel	Guillermo Arriaga	United States; Mexico; France	English, Arabic, Spanish, Japanese, Japanese Sign language, Berber languages
2011 (84th)	A Separation	جدایی نادر از سیمین (Jodái-e Náder az Simin)	Asghar Farhadi	Iran	Persian
2012 (85th)	Amour	Amour	Michael Haneke	Austria; France; Germany	French
2018 (91st)	Roma	Roma	Alfonso Cuarón	Mexico	Spanish, Mixtec
2019 (92nd)	Parasite	기생충	Bong Joon-ho; Han Jin-won	South Korea	Korean
2020 (93rd)	Minari	미나리	Lee Isaac Chung	United States	Korean (some parts in English)
2021 (94th)	The Worst Person in the World	Verdens verste menneske	Joachim Trier; Eskil Vogt	Norway	Norwegian
2023 (96th)	Anatomy of a Fall	Anatomie d'une chute	Arthur Harari; Justine Triet	France	French, English, German
2023 (96th)	Past Lives	Past lives	Celine Song	United States; South Korea	Korean, English
2025 (98th)	It Was Just an Accident	یک تصادف ساده	Jafar Panahi; Nader Saïvar; Shadmehr Rastin; Mehdi Mahmoudian	Iran; France; Luxembourg	Persian, Azerbaijani
2025 (98th)	Sentimental Value	Affeksjonsverdi	Eskil Vogt; Joachim Trier	Norway; France; Germany; Denmark; Sweden; United Kingdom	Norwegian, English, Swedish, Danish

== Notes ==
A^{1} ^{2} ^{3} ^{4} ^{5} ^{6} : The Academy Award for Best Foreign Language Film (now International Feature Film) had not been created yet when this film received its nomination.
B: Shoeshine (1946) won a Special Award the same year because "the high quality of this motion picture, brought to eloquent life in a country scarred by war, is proof to the world that the creative spirit can triumph over adversity".
C: The Bicycle Thief (1948) won a Special Foreign Language Film Award the same year.
D: Rashomon (1950) won an Honorary Foreign Language Film Award the previous year.
E: Forbidden Games (1952) won an Honorary Foreign Language Film Award two years earlier.
F: Gate of Hell (1953) won an Honorary Foreign Language Film Award the same year.
G: Two People Exchanging Saliva (2025) tied with The Singers for Best Live Action Short Film.
