= Stefan Korte =

German sound engineer

- Occupation: Sound engineer

Stefan Korte is a German sound engineer. He was nominated for an Academy Award in the category Best Sound for the film All Quiet on the Western Front.

== Selected filmography ==
- All Quiet on the Western Front (2022; co-nominated with Viktor Prášil, Frank Kruse, Markus Stemler and Lars Ginzel)
