= Gaza Strip (film) =

2002 American documentary film by James Longley

- Directed by: James Longley
- Release date: 2002
- Running time: 74 minutes
- Country: United States

Gaza Strip is a 2002 American documentary film by James Longley which records events taking place in 2001 during the Second Intifada.

== Synopsis ==
The film focuses on 13-year-old Mohammed Hejazi, a second-grade dropout the filmmaker encountered at the Karni crossing in the Gaza Strip, where Palestinian children often gather to throw stones at Israeli tanks.

The documentary includes the election of Ariel Sharon as Israeli Prime Minister in 2001 and the first major armed incursion into “Area A” by IDF forces.

== Reception ==
In December 2023, Gaza Strip was featured as the Palestine Film Institute's Film of the Week.
