= Stefan Eichenberger =

Swiss film director and film producer

Stefan Eichenberger (1984 in Aarau) is a Swiss film director and film producer. For his production of the short film Parvaneh, he was nominated for an Oscar for Best Live Action Short Film at the 87th Academy Awards along with Talkhon Hamzavi.

== Career ==
As a teenager he worked on the Swiss youth program “VideoGang”. In 2006 he established the film production company hiddenframes together with Gregor Frei and Joel Glatz.

From 2006 to 2010 he studied Media & Communication, Philosophy and Sociology at the Universities of Fribourg and Bern. He completed his studies with the top score of “summa cum laude”.

From 2010 to 2012 he studied film production at the Zurich University of the Arts (ZHdK). In 2011/12 his short silent film “Salty Times” was brought to the Swiss cinemas as a supporting film of the Academy Award winner “The Artist”.

His short film Parvaneh, developed during his studies at the Zurich University of the Arts (ZHdK), not only won the Student Academy Award and the film award First Steps, but was also nominated for an Oscar for Best Live Action Short Film.

Since 2014 he is also a co-owner of the Swiss production company CONTRAST FILM based in Bern and Zurich. In August 2015 he produced the episodic film WONDERLAND, a collective project created by ten young Swiss directors, which celebrated its world premiere at the international film festival in Locarno.

== Filmography ==
As a director

- 2004: Kofmehl – Der Film
- 2005: Realaton
- 2009: Der Fitnessteller
- 2010: Poulet
- 2011: Salty Times

As a producer

- 2007: Doppelpass
- 2012: Parvaneh
- 2012: Das Vorspiel
- 2012: A World for Raúl (Un Mundo Para Raúl)
- 2013: Montauk
- 2013: Neuland
- 2014: The Circle
- 2015: Heimatland
