= Angels Are Made of Light =

2018 film

- Film poster
- Directed by: James Longley
- Production companies: Daylight Factory, Louverture Films
- Release date: August 23, 2018 (Telluride)
- Running time: 117 minutes
- Country: United States
- Box office: $7,919

Angels Are Made of Light is a 2018 documentary film by James Longley.

== Reception ==
=== Critical response ===
On review aggregator website Rotten Tomatoes, the film holds an approval rating of 100% based on 15 reviews, with an average rating of 7.7/10.
