= Eva von Bahr (make-up artist) =

Swedish beauty artist (make-up 1968)

Eva Elisabet von Bahr
- Born: 17 December 1968 (age 57)
- Occupations: Make-up artist; hair stylist

Eva Elisabet von Bahr (born 17 December 1968) is a Swedish make-up artist and hair stylist. She is best known for her works in Arn: The Knight Templar (2007), The Girl with the Dragon Tattoo (2011), The 100-Year-Old Man Who Climbed Out the Window and Disappeared (2013), and A Man Called Ove (2015), Dune (2021). She received her first Oscar nomination Academy Award for Best Makeup and Hairstyling at the 88th Academy Awards along with Love Larson.

== Awards and nominations ==
- 2014: Guldbagge Award for Best Makeup and Hair for The 100-Year-Old Man Who Climbed Out the Window and Disappeared (nominated)
- 2015: Guldbagge Award for Best Makeup and Hair for A Man Called Ove (won)
- 2015: Academy Award for Best Makeup and Hairstyling for The 100-Year-Old Man Who Climbed Out the Window and Disappeared (nominated)
- 2016: Academy Award for Best Makeup and Hairstyling for A Man Called Ove (nominated)
- 2022: Academy Award for Best Makeup and Hairstyling for Dune (nominated)

== See also ==
- List of foreign-language films nominated for Academy Awards
