= Adam J. Graves =

American filmmaker and philosopher

- Born: U.S.
- Education: University of Pennsylvania (Ph.D.)
- Occupations: Filmmaker, philosopher, author
- Years active: 2021–present
- Spouse: Suchitra Mattai

Adam J. Graves is an American filmmaker and philosopher. He earned an Academy Award nomination for his film Anuja, which he wrote, directed and edited.

== Early life and education ==
Graves studied at the University of Pennsylvania, receiving a Bachelor of Arts in South Asia Regional Studies (summa cum laude, Phi Beta Kappa), followed by a Doctor of Philosophy in philosophy of religion. He also spent time as a visiting student at Banaras Hindu University in Varanasi, India, in the late 1990s.

== Career ==
Graves is a professor of philosophy at Metropolitan State University of Denver, where he founded the Denver Project for Humanistic Inquiry (Dphi), a public humanities center focusing on the intersection of philosophy, film, literature, and the arts. He previously taught at the University of Pennsylvania and in the University of Virginia's Semester at Sea program.

Graves wrote and directed his first short film, Cycle Vérité, which premiered at the Denver Film Festival in 2021. In 2024, his short film Anuja was nominated for the Academy Award for Best Live Action Short Film in 2025. His films tend to explore larger philosophical and socio-ethical issues within the context of more intimate familial relationships.

Philosophical Contributions

Graves' philosophical contributions explore themes in phenomenology, the philosophy of religion, and hermeneutics, with particular attention to the nature of agency, moral responsibility, and narrative selfhood. He has worked on Paul Ricœur and the phenomenology of revelation, and developed a normative theory of action, which conceives of freedom as an “achievement of narrative self-understanding.” He has said that his philosophical thought fuels his work as a filmmaker.

2012 Congressional Campaign

In 2012, Graves served as Campaign Manager for Jim Graves's bid to unseat Michele Bachmann in Minnesota's 6th congressional district. Largely operating out of his family's car, Graves ran a campaign that was outspent 10-to-1 in what proved to be one of the most expensive congressional reelection campaigns in United States history. Despite the district's strong Republican lean, Graves lost by a single percentage point.

== Personal life ==
Graves is married to multidisciplinary contemporary artist Suchitra Mattai.

== Filmography ==
Year	Title	Contribution	Note
2021	Cycle Vérité	Director and writer	Short film
2024	The Other Side of the Sun	Editor and Producer	Short film
2024	Anuja	Director, writer and editor	Short film

== Publications ==
- 2021 – The Phenomenology of Revelation in Heidegger, Marion, and Ricoeur ISBN 978-1-7936405-7-4

== Awards and nominations ==
Year	Result	Award	Category	Work	Ref.
2024	Won	Montclair Film Festival	Audience Award Short Film	Anuja	
2024	Won	Foyle Film Festival	Best International Short Film	Anuja	
2024	Won	HollyShorts Film Festival	Best Live Action	Anuja	
2024	Won	New York Shorts International Film Festival	Grand Prize	Anuja	
2025	Nominated	Academy Awards	Best Live Action Short Film	Anuja	
2025	Won	Gold List	Best Live Action Short	Anuja	
