= Iraq in Fragments =

2006 documentary film by James Longley

- Theatrical poster
- Directed by: James Longley
- Produced by: John Sinno; James Longley
- Cinematography: James Longley
- Edited by: Billy McMillin; Fiona Otway; James Longley
- Music by: James Longley
- Distributed by: Typecast Releasing; HBO Documentary Films
- Release dates: January 21, 2006 (Sundance Film Festival); January 21, 2007 (United States)
- Running time: 94 minutes
- Country: United States
- Languages: Arabic; English; Kurdish

Iraq in Fragments is a documentary film directed by James Longley. Longley shot the film in Digital Video on a Panasonic DVX100 miniDV camcorder. The film premiered at the 2006 Sundance Film Festival where it won three awards: "Directing Award Documentary", "Editing Award Documentary" and "Excellence in Cinematography Award Documentary". The film is also a part of the Iraq Media Action Project film collection. It was nominated for an Academy Award for Best Documentary Feature. The film was shot in Iraq and edited at 911 Media Arts Center in Seattle. This film has three parts to it which describe the viewpoints of Sunni, Shi'ite, and Kurdish residents.

== Film credits ==
- Director: James Longley
- Producers: John Sinno, James Longley
- Editors: Billy McMillin, Fiona Otway, James Longley
- Camera: James Longley
- Post Coordinator: Basil Shadid
- Sound / Music: James Longley
- 2nd Unit Camera: Margaret Longley
- Re-Recording Mixer: Dave Howe
- Colorist: Bill Lord
- Translators: Ahmed Ayed, Ali Zekki, Dler Hashim, Duler Bojan, Istifan Braymok, Mohammed Mohana, Mustapha Hasan, Nadeem Hamid, Reyal Sindi, Zaid Al Rawi, Zaid Fahmi, Zirak Dilshad

== Reception ==
Iraq in Fragments has an approval rating of 91% on review aggregator website Rotten Tomatoes, based on 65 reviews, and an average rating of 7.65/10. The website's critical consensus states, "A stylistically bold, humanist take on the difficulties of post-invasion Iraq". It also has a score of 84 out of 100 on Metacritic, based on 26 critics, indicating "universal acclaim".
