= Tadashi Nishimatsu =

Japanese hairstylist

- Occupation: Hairstylist

Tadashi Nishimatsu is a Japanese hairstylist. He was nominated for an Academy Award in the category Best Makeup and Hairstyling for the film Kohuko.

== Selected filmography ==
- Kokuho (2025; co-nominated with Kyoko Toyokawa and Naomi Hibino)
