= Siqi Song =

Chinese director and animator

- 宋思琪
- Born: 1989 (age 35–36); China
- Occupation(s): Director and animator
- Years active: 2006-current

Siqi Song (born 1989, 宋思琪) is a Chinese director and animator.

In January 2020 she received an Oscar nomination in the category Best Animated Short Film for her student short film Sister.

== Early life and education ==
Song graduated from the Central Academy of Fine Arts in 2013 and from the California Institute of the Arts in 2016 with a Master in Experimental Animation.

She is based in Los Angeles.

== Career ==
Her animated films have been selected in many festivals and awards ceremonies worldwide including Sundance, SXSW and BAFTA.

Her most recent animated short, Sister, was nominated at the 2018 Annie Awards.

In January 2020, Sister was nominated for the Academy Award for Best Animated Short Film.

== Filmography ==
- Encounter (2012) - writer, director (short film)
- Food (2014) - writer, director (documentary short film)
- Sister (2018) - writer, director (short film)
- The Coin (2019) - writer, director (short film)
