= Talkhon Hamzavi =

- Born: 1979; Tehran, Iran
- Education: Zürcher Hochschule der Künste
- Occupations: Film director, screenwriter
- Years active: 2004–present
- Notable work: Parvaneh

Talkhon Hamzavi (Persian: تلخون حمزوی, born 1979) is an Iranian-Swiss film director and screenwriter. For her work, Parvaneh, she was nominated for an Oscar for Best Live Action Short Film at the 87th Academy Awards along with Stefan Eichenberger.

== Filmography ==
As director:

- 2012 - Parvaneh
- 2010 - Taub
- 2009 - Es ist normal, verschieden zu sein
- 2007 - Der süsse kalte Hauch
- 2004 - Wenn der Schleier fällt
