= Island in Between =

2023 documentary short film by S. Leo Chiang and Jean Tsien

Island in Between is a 2023 documentary short film by S. Leo Chiang and Jean Tsien.

== Summary ==
The documentary film tells the story of the islands of Kinmen, and Chiang reflecting on his relationship between Taiwan, China and the United States, and the cross-strait relations.

== Accolades ==
The film was nominated in the Best Documentary Short Film category of the 96th Academy Awards.
