= Markus Stemler =

German sound engineer

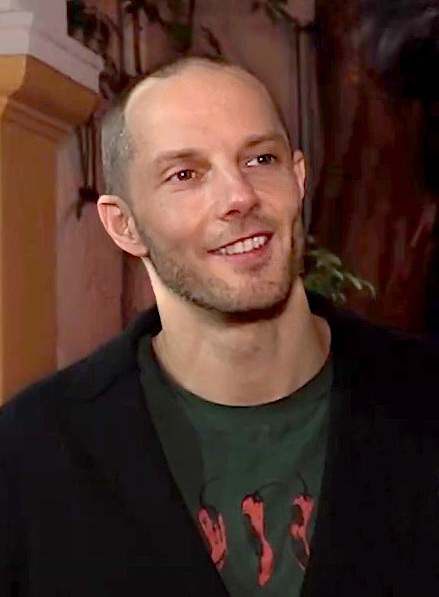
- Stemler in 2023
- Born: Elsterwerda, Germany
- Occupation: Sound engineer

Markus Stemler is a German sound engineer. He won a British Academy Film Award and was nominated for another one in the category Best Sound for the films Rush and All Quiet on the Western Front.

At the 95th Academy Awards, he was nominated for an Academy Award for Best Sound. His nomination was shared with Viktor Prášil, Frank Kruse, Lars Ginzel and Stefan Korte.

== Selected filmography ==
- Rush (2013)
- All Quiet on the Western Front (2022)
