= Kyoko Toyokawa =

Japanese make-up artist and hairstylist

- Occupations: Make-up artist, hairstylist

Kyoko Toyokawa is a Japanese make-up artist and hairstylist. She was nominated for an Academy Award in the category Best Makeup and Hairstyling for the film Kohuko.

== Selected filmography ==
- Kokuho (2025; co-nominated with Naomi Hibino and Tadashi Nishimatsu)
