= Viktor Prášil =

Czech sound engineer

- Born: 29 July 1987 (age 37); Prague, Czechoslovakia
- Occupation: Sound engineer

Viktor Prášil (born 29 July 1987) is a Czech sound engineer. He was nominated for an Academy Award in the category Best Sound for the film All Quiet on the Western Front.

At the 76th British Academy Film Awards, he won a BAFTA Award for Best Sound. His win was shared with Lars Ginzel, Frank Kruse and Markus Stemler.

== Selected filmography ==
- All Quiet on the Western Front (2022)
