= Suchitra Mattai =

Guyanese-born American contemporary artist (born 1973)

- Born: 1973 (age 52–53); Georgetown, Guyana
- Education: Rutgers University (BA), University of Pennsylvania (MFA, MA)
- Occupation: Visual artist
- Known for: Mixed media painting, fiber work, sculpture, large scale installation
- Website: suchitramattaiart.com

Suchitra Mattai (born 1973) is a Guyanese-born American multidisciplinary contemporary artist, of South Asian descent. Her art practice includes mixed media paintings, fiber works, sculptures, and large scale installations which draw upon myth, memory, and her ancestral history, and often invite critical reflection on the legacy of colonialism in the Indo-Caribbean. She lives in Los Angeles, California.

== Early life and education ==
Mattai was born in 1973, in Georgetown, Guyana. Her great-grandparents were indentured laborers, brought from Uttar Pradesh in northern India to the Caribbean country of Guyana to work the sugar plantations under the British colonialists. In 1974, young Mattai and her family moved to Canada. As a child, Mattai learned sewing, embroidering, and other craft-based techniques from her grandmothers.

Mattai attended Rutgers University as an undergraduate, and graduated in 1994 with a BA degree in statistics. She received fellowships to study at the American Institute of Indian Studies (2000), Udaipur, India; and the Royal College of Art (2002), London. Mattai holds an MFA degree in painting and drawing, and an MA degree in South Asian art, both from the University of Pennsylvania in Philadelphia.

== Work ==
Mattai's works include a wide-range materials and processes, from collages that incorporate colonial-era prints to large-scale sculptures and tapestries woven out of saris collected from her family.

In 2024, Mattai produced the Hindi-language short film Anuja, for which she received an Academy Award nomination. The film, directed by her husband Adam J. Graves, deals with issues closely connected to her practice: such as labor and gender.

Her work has been exhibited at the 36th São Paulo Art Biennial (2025); the Sharjah Biennial 14 (2019) in Sharjah, United Arab Emirates; the Museum of Contemporary Art Chicago (2022–2023); the Crystal Bridges Museum (2020), Bentonville, Arkansas; the Institute of Contemporary Art, Boston (2023); the Museum of Contemporary Art, San Diego (2024); and the Kohler Arts Center (2022–2023), in Sheboygan, Wisconsin. Mattai's work is also part of the Jorge M. Perez Collection, displayed at the El Espacio 23, in Miami, Florida.

=== She Walked in Reverse and Found Their Song (2024) ===
Through multiple mixed-media installations, Mattai's solo exhibition She Walked in Reverse and Found Their Song (2024) at the Institute of Contemporary Art San Francisco conjures an imagined domestic space inspired by Mattai's mother's familial home. Mattai's interactive sculptures invite viewers to explore the concept of "home" and to feel the power of family, care, and community in the face of migration and upheaval.

=== We Are Nomads, We Are Dreamers (2024) ===
A commissioned large-scale work titled, We Are Nomads, We Are Dreamers (2024) by Mattai is at the Socrates Sculpture Park, Queens, New York City, commemorating the migratory journeys of diasporic communities across oceans. The work was inspired by the Park's position along the East River, which flows into the Atlantic Ocean, Mattai's installation features a series of sculptures at monumental size that combine mirrored stainless steel, vintage saris, and other fabric. The space has been activated by monthly dance performances, and pays homage to the artist's Indo-Caribbean ancestors and the stories of many Queens residents.

== Awards and honors ==
In 2025, Mattai was awarded a Joan Mitchell Fellowship. Other recognitions of Mattai's work include an Anonymous Was a Woman Award (2023), and a Smithsonian Artist Research Fellowship (2023).

== Collections ==
Mattai's work is part of the permanent collections of several notable museums, including:

- Crystal Bridges Museum, Bentonville, Arkansas, US
- Nasher Museum of Art, Durham, North Carolina, US
- Tampa Museum of Art, Tampa, Florida, US
- Portland Museum of Art, Portland, Maine, US
- Denver Art Museum, Denver, Colorado, US
- Joslyn Art Museum, Omaha, Nebraska, US
- Kiran Nadar Museum of Art, Delhi, India
- University of Michigan Museum of Art, Ann Arbor, Michigan, US

== Exhibitions ==
=== Solo exhibitions ===
- Sugar Bound (2018), Center for Visual Arts, Denver, Colorado
- Breathing Room (2021), Boise Art Museum, Boise, Idaho
- Osmosis (2022), Kavi Gupta Gallery, Chicago, Illinois
- Herself as Another (2022) Hollis Taggart, New York City, New York
- In the Absence of Power. In the Presence of Love (2023), Roberts Projects, Los Angeles, California
- Bodies and Souls (2024), Tampa Museum of Art, Tampa, Florida
- She Walked in Reverse and Found Their Song (2024), Institute of Contemporary Art San Francisco, San Francisco, California
- Myth from Matter (2024), National Museum of Women in the Arts, Washington, D.C.
