= S. Leo Chiang =

American documentary filmmaker

- 江松長
- Born: Kaohsiung, Taiwan
- Education: University of Southern California (BS, MFA)
- Occupation: Filmmaker
- Website: sleochiang.com

Sung-Chang Leo Chiang (Chinese: 江松長, born in Kaohsiung City) is a Taiwanese-American documentary filmmaker.

== Life ==
Born in Taiwan and based in San Francisco & Taipei, Leo received his MFA in film production from University of Southern California. He lectured in the Social Documentation program at University of California, Santa Cruz, and was a fellow in the Sundance Institute Documentary Film Program.

His previous film, Our Time Machine, directed with Yang Sun, premiered at the Tribeca Film Festival, then played at over 50 film festivals worldwide, winning 10 awards, and was nominated for a News & Documentary Emmy Award and a Gotham Award. In 2020, he directed two episodes of the Peabody Award-winning 5-part PBS series, Asian Americans, which traces the epic history of Asians in the US over the past 200 years. His other films Out Run, co-directed with award-winning filmmaker Johnny Symons, premiered at the Full Frame Documentary Film Festival and won Best Cinematography for a Feature Length Documentary Film at the Los Angeles Asian Pacific Film Festival; Mr. Cao Goes to Washington, won the Inspiration Award at the 2012 Full Frame Documentary Film Festival; A Village Called Versailles, about the rebuilding and transformation of the Vietnamese American community in post-Katrina New Orleans, was nominated for a national News & Documentary Emmy Award. It picked up eight film festival awards, aired on PBS Independent Lens series, and has been acquired by more than 200 academic and public libraries.

His other films include To You Sweetheart, Aloha (PBS broadcast 2006), One + One (CINE Golden Eagle Award 2002), and Safe Journey. Leo also collaborates with other documentary filmmakers as an editor (True-Hearted Vixen, POV 2001; Recalling Orange County, PBS/VOCES 2006) and as a cameraman (Ask Not, Independent Lens 2009).

His 2023 film Island in Between, about Kinmen Island and its Cold War past (e.g. First Taiwan Strait Crisis and Second Taiwan Strait Crisis), was nominated for the 96th Academy Awards in the category of Best Documentary Short Subject. Reuters reported that Chiang "aimed to use the island as a visual representation of the tensions with China, but also to ultimately tell a story about what it means to be Taiwanese."

== Filmography ==
- Island in Between (2023)
- Our Time Machine (2019)
- Out Run (2016)
- Mr. Cao Goes to Washington (2012)
- A Village Called Versailles (2009)
- To You Sweetheart, Aloha (2004)
- Safe Journey (2004)
- One + One (2002)
