= James Longley (filmmaker) =

American filmmaker

- Born: James Bertrand Longley
- Occupations: Documentary filmmaker, producer.
- Years active: 2002–present

James Bertrand Longley is an American filmmaker.

== Career ==
His work includes the documentary, Gaza Strip, released in 2002. His production, Iraq in Fragments, presents a view of Iraq and Iraqis during the first two years of Iraq War. It was awarded three jury awards at the 2006 Sundance Film Festival and was nominated for an Academy Award for Best Documentary Feature, but lost to An Inconvenient Truth. His short film Sari's Mother premiered at the 2006 Toronto International Film Festival and was nominated for an Academy Award for Documentary Short but lost to Freeheld.

In 2009, Longley was awarded a $500,000 MacArthur Fellowship "Genius Grant."

Between 2007 and 2009 Longley was working on a film in Iran. The film was cut short during the time of the elections and ensuing protests in June, 2009. On Sunday, June 14, The New York Times Lede blog reported he "was arrested with his translator while interviewing people on a street in Tehran, near the Interior Ministry," and later interviewed him about his and his translator's experiences. This film is currently on hold indefinitely.

Following up on IRAQ IN FRAGMENTS, Longley produced and filmed the feature documentary ANGELS ARE MADE OF LIGHT in Afghanistan. The film, following life in a school over three years, makes Afghan reality accessible by giving the audience a human-scale entry point - the world of a neighborhood school in Kabul - through which the larger context of Afghan society and history may be more clearly understood. Completed in 2018, the film accurately predicts the 2021 Taliban takeover of Afghanistan.

Reviewing ANGELS ARE MADE OF LIGHT in the Los Angeles Times in 2019, film critic Kenneth Turan wrote: “What is life like on the ground for ordinary people in another culture, another world? That’s been the bread and butter of observational documentaries for forever, but almost never is it done with the kind of beauty and grace filmmaker James Longley brings to his Afghanistan-set ANGELS ARE MADE OF LIGHT. As his 2006 Oscar-nominated IRAQ IN FRAGMENTS demonstrated, MacArthur Fellow Longley, who serves as his own cinematographer as well as directs, has an almost magical ability to envelope us in other realities. He does it via the poetry of his imagery as well as a gift for focused illumination that creates empathetic portraits of people who are both ordinary and intensely involving."

After a festival run starting at Telluride, TIFF and the New York Film Festival, ANGELS ARE MADE OF LIGHT opened theatrically at Film Forum and was the New York Times’ Critic’s Pick.

He is the founder of Daylight Factory, a production company committed to creating documentary films about international subjects with international appeal.

== Personal life ==
Longley's middle name is a tribute to philosopher Bertrand Russell. He studied "film and Russian at Wesleyan University and the All-Russian Institute of Cinematography (VGIK) at Moscow." Longley is fluent in Russian.

== Filmography ==
Features
Year	Title	Notes
2002	Gaza Strip	
2006	Iraq in Fragments	Nominated for the Academy Award for Best Documentary Feature
2007-2009	Untitled Iran Project	On hold
2018	Angels Are Made of Light	
Short Films
Year	Title	Notes
1994	Portrait of Boy with Dog	
2007	Sari's Mother	Nominated for the Academy Award for Best Documentary (Short Subject)
2012	Ejaz's Story : UNICEF Pakistan	

== Honors and awards ==
- 1994 Student Academy Award
- Nestor Almendros Award, Human Rights Watch Film Festival
- International Federation of Film Critics Award, Thessaloniki
- International Documentary Association Award, Best Documentary Film
- Grand Jury Award, Full Frame Festival
- Gold Hugo, Chicago Film Festival, Best Documentary
- Best Documentary, Cleveland International Film Festival
- 2006 Gotham Award, Best Documentary Film
- 2006 Award for Best Documentary Cinematography, Sundance Film Festival
- 2006 Award for Best Documentary Editing, Sundance Film Festival
- 2006 Award for Best Documentary Directing, Sundance Film Festival
- 2007 Academy Award nomination, Best Documentary Feature
- Emmy Award nomination, Best Cinematography
- 2008 Academy Award nomination, Best Documentary Short
- 2009 MacArthur Fellow
- 2011 United States Artists Ford Fellow
