= Sister (2018 film) =

- Directed by: Siqi Song
- Produced by: Siqi Song
- Music by: Karen Tanaka
- Production company: CalArts
- Distributed by: Miyu Distribution
- Release date: June 15, 2018 (Annecy International Animation Film Festival)
- Running time: 8 minutes
- Country: United States

Sister is a 2018 stop motion animated film directed by Siqi Song during her studies at CalArts Experimental Animation Program as her graduation film.

In January 2020, it was nominated for the 2020 Academy Award for Best Animated Short Film.

== Accolades ==
The short has been presented and won awards in a number of festivals including the Oscar qualifying HollyShorts Film Festival, the Aspen Shortsfest, the Austin Film Festival, and the Foyle Film Festival where it won four Oscar qualifying prizes for best animation.

The short was nominated for the Annie Awards and Shortlisted at the BAFTA Student Film Awards for best student film in 2018. It was also nominated for Best Animated Short Film at the 92nd Academy Awards.

== Plot ==
A man thinks back to his childhood memories of growing up with an annoying little sister in China in the 1990's. What would his life be like if things go different?

== See also ==
- 2019 in film
- The Farewell-a similar 2019 Asian American related film
- Abominable-another 2019 Asian American related film
