= Naomi Hibino =

Japanese make-up artist

- Occupation: Make-up artist

Naomi Hibino is a Japanese make-up artist. She was nominated for an Academy Award in the category Best Makeup and Hairstyling for the film Kohuko.

== Selected filmography ==
- Kokuho (2025; co-nominated with Kyoko Toyokawa and Tadashi Nishimatsu)
