= Sari's Mother =

2006 film

- Directed by: James Longley
- Produced by: James Longley
- Edited by: James Longley
- Production company: Daylight Factory
- Distributed by: Cinema Guild (non-theatrical)
- Release date: September 8, 2006 (TIFF)
- Running time: 21 minutes
- Country: United States
- Language: Arabic

Sari's Mother is a 2006 American short documentary film directed by James Longley. It looks at an Iraqi mother seeking health care for her 10-year-old son, who is dying of AIDS, against the background of war and occupation. The film was nominated for an Academy Award for Best Documentary Short.
