= Anuja (film) =

2024 American short drama film

- Official poster
- Directed by: Adam J. Graves
- Story by: Adam J. Graves
- Produced by: Guneet Monga; Priyanka Chopra Jonas; Mindy Kaling; Suchitra Mattai; Krushan Naik; Michael Graves; Aaron Kopp; Ksheetij Saini; Alexandra Blaney; Devananda Graves
- Starring: Sajda Pathan; Ananya Shanbhag; Nagesh Bhonsle; Gulshan Walia; Sushil Parwana; Sunita Bhadauria; Rudolfo Rajeev Hubert; Jugal Kishore; Pankaj Gupta
- Cinematography: Akash Raje
- Edited by: Krushan Naik; Adam J. Graves
- Music by: Fabrizio Mancinelli
- Production companies: Shine Global; Krushan Naik Films; Graves Films; Salaam Baalak Trust
- Distributed by: Netflix
- Release dates: 17 August 2024 (HollyShorts Film Festival); 5 February 2025 (Netflix)
- Running time: 22 minutes
- Country: United States
- Language: Hindi

Anuja (Hindi: अनुजा) is a 2024 American Hindi-language short film written and directed by Adam J. Graves. Starring Sajda Pathan, Ananya Shanbhag and Nagesh Bhonsle, it tells the story of a gifted nine-year-old girl who, alongside her sister Palak, faces a life-changing opportunity that tests their bond and mirrors the struggles of girls worldwide. The project is a collaboration between Graves and his wife Suchitra Mattai, who served as a producer. It premiered on 17 August 2024 at the HollyShorts Film Festival.

On 23 January 2025, it was nominated for the Best Live Action Short Film at the 97th Academy Awards. It was made available for streaming on Netflix from February 5, 2025.

== Synopsis ==
Anuja is a 9-year-old girl living in Delhi, India with her older sister, Palak. The two are orphaned, and work in a garment factory in order to make ends meet. One day, Anuja is called into the office of their boss, Mr. Verma, as a local schoolteacher, Mr. Mishra, has requested to see her. Mr. Mishra urges the intelligent, mathematically brilliant Anuja to take an upcoming entrance exam, which will allow her to earn a full scholarship to a boarding school, where she can receive a proper education. Mr. Verma, however, wants to keep Anuja working for him, and dismisses Mr. Mishra.

Palak also wants Anuja to have a better life for herself, and helps her earn the exam fee of ₹400 by selling tote bags made from garment scraps that Palak has secretly taken from the factory. Anuja manages to sell two bags for ₹400 each, and she and Palak celebrate by going to the movies and treating themselves to delicacies. Anuja admits that she knows Palak had been saving the bags so that she could afford to get married, but Palak implores her to keep the money and take the exam, as she does not belong in a factory. However, when Palak explains that a boarding school will separate them, Anuja becomes more reluctant to take the test.

Furthermore, Mr. Verma calls Anuja into his office, where she impresses him with her mathematical ability. Mr. Verma orders her to meet him in his office every week, which will cause her to miss the exam, but he promises her an important, well-paid job if she complies. He also threatens to fire both her and Palak if she does not agree, which troubles Anuja, as Palak's plan is to become a sewing machine operator once Anuja leaves so that she can earn more money in her absence.

On the morning of the exam, Palak sends Anuja off to the school. As the exam time approaches, both Mr. Verma and Mr. Mishra wait anxiously for Anuja's arrival. Anuja, however, lingers in the streets, not revealing her final choice.

== Cast ==
- Sajda Pathan as Anuja
- Ananya Shanbhag as Palak
- Nagesh Bhonsle as Mr. Verma
- Gulshan Walia Mr. Mishra
- Sushil Parwana as Floor Manager
- Sunita Bhadauria as Friendly shopper
- Rudolfo Rajeev Hubert as Store Manager
- Jugal Kishore as Security Guard
- Pankaj Gupta as Shopper

== Production ==
Along with Graves Films, the film was developed and shot with the assistance of various community partners, such as the Salaam Baalak Trust, an Indian non-profit and non-governmental organization which provides support for street and working children in the Delhi-NCR. Shine Global, the non-profit production company joined the team in order to help with social impact campaign of the film.

In October 2024, Guneet Monga joined the production team as executive producer. In November 2024, Mindy Kaling joined as producer.

In January 2025, Priyanka Chopra Jonas joined the film as an executive producer.

== Release ==
Anuja had its world premiere in Oscar-qualifying 24th DeadCENTER Film Festival on 8 June 2024.

On 23 July it made it to the official Selection of the 2024 Indy Shorts International Film Festival.

On 17 August 2024, it competed at the HollyShorts Film Festival in Oscar-qualifying categories and won Best Live Action Short Award.

In October 2024, it competed in Montclair Film Festival, where it won Audience Award Short Film.

On 9 November 2024, it was played in Narrative Shorts 9 at the St. Louis International Film Festival in International Spotlight Section.

On 6 December 2024, it was showcased at the HollyShorts London Film Festival in Inaugural Class of 2024 Official Selections.

In January 2025, Netflix acquired distribution rights to the short film. It is available for streaming from 5 February 2025.

== Reception ==
Mark Jacob reviewing for We Love Short Films rated the film 5 out of 5 stars. Mark Jacob praising Graves, wrote that Graves "skillfully captures the essence of Anuja’s world, using striking visuals to convey her youthful resilience." He opined that "For anyone who appreciates the art of storytelling through film, this is an experience not to be missed."

Ahana Tiwari writing for Zee News rated the film 4 out of 5 and wrote, "The film succeeds in its mission to raise awareness about the plight of child laborers and the importance of education, leaving a lasting impression on anyone who watches it."

Sonal Pandya writing for Times Now News rated the film 3.5 out of 5 and wrote, "In just 22 minutes, the short film takes us on an emotional journey."

== Accolades ==
Award	Date of ceremony	Category	Recipient(s)	Result	Ref.
HollyShorts Film Festival	19 August 2024	Best Live Action Short Award	Anuja	Won	
New York Shorts International Film Festival	17 October 2024	Grand Prize	Anuja	Won	
Montclair Film Festival	27 October 2024	Audience Award Short Film	Anuja	Won	
Academy Awards	March 2, 2025	Best Live Action Short Film	Anuja	Nominated	

== Impact of the film ==
Anuja addresses the themes of child labour and girls' education:

- As of 2020, 160 million children, roughly 1 in 10 children globally, were involved in child labour, marking an increase for the first time in 20 years.
- 79 million children were working in hazardous conditions that directly threatened their health, safety, or development.
- Globally, 129 million girls are not in school.

Investing in girls' secondary education leads to significant benefits:

- Increases in lifetime earnings
- Higher growth rates
- Declines in child marriage rates
- Reductions in child mortality rates
- Decreases in maternal mortality rates
- Lower rates of child stunting
