= Frank Kruse =

German sound engineer

- Occupation: Sound engineer

Frank Kruse is a German sound engineer. He was nominated for an Academy Award in the category Best Sound for the film All Quiet on the Western Front.

At the 76th British Academy Film Awards, he won a BAFTA Award for Best Sound. His win was shared with Lars Ginzel, Viktor Prášil and Markus Stemler.

== Selected filmography ==
- All Quiet on the Western Front (2022)
