= Lars Ginzel =

German sound engineer

- Occupation: Sound engineer

Lars Ginzel is a German sound engineer. He was nominated for an Academy Award in the category Best Sound for the film All Quiet on the Western Front.

At the 76th British Academy Film Awards, he won a BAFTA Award for Best Sound. His win was shared with Frank Kruse, Viktor Prášil and Markus Stemler.

== Selected filmography ==
- All Quiet on the Western Front (2022)
