= Parvaneh (film) =

2012 film

- Film poster
- Directed by: Talkhon Hamzavi
- Written by: Talkhon Hamzavi
- Produced by: Stefan Eichenberger
- Starring: Nissa Kashani; Cheryl Graf; Albert Tanner
- Cinematography: Stefan Dux
- Edited by: Hannes Rüttimann
- Music by: Dominik Blumer
- Production companies: Zürcher Hochschule der Künste ZHdK – Departement Darstellende Künste und Film; SRF Schweizer Radio und Fernsehen
- Release date: June 2012
- Running time: 24 minutes
- Country: Switzerland
- Languages: Swiss German, Persian, German

Parvaneh is a 2012 Swiss short drama film written and directed by Talkhon Hamzavi. It was nominated for the Academy Award for Best Live Action Short Film at the 87th Academy Awards after winning the Silver Medal in the Foreign Category at the 2013 Student Academy Awards.

== Synopsis ==
Parvaneh is a young Afghan migrant living in a Swiss transit centre. After learning that her father is ill, she goes to Zurich for the first time to send money to her family, and the trip leads to a series of encounters.

== Cast ==
The cast includes:

- Nissa Kashani as Parvaneh
- Cheryl Graf as Punkgirl
- Albert Tanner as Farmer
- Brigitte Beyeler as Punkgirl's mother
- Patrick Slanzi as Partygoer
- Patrick Yogarajan as Western Union employee 1
- Julia Frey as Western Union employee 2
- Alireza Bayram as Iranian man 1
- Natalie Klaus as Manor saleswoman
- Mani Louyeh as Iranian man 2

== Production ==
Parvaneh was the film with which Talkhon Hamzavi completed her Master’s in film at Zurich University of the Arts in 2012. It was shot over ten days in a real asylum centre in Morschach, canton Schwyz, and in Zurich. Ahead of the 87th Academy Awards, Hamzavi and part of the crew travelled to Los Angeles to promote it, with support for the campaign provided by Zürcher Hochschule der Künste, the Federal Office of Culture, SRF, Swiss Films, and Bernese film funding.

== Reception ==
=== Awards ===
The film won awards including the Grand Prize for Fiction at the 2013 Sichuan TV Festival, the Premio Principado de Asturias al Mejor Cortometraje at the 2013 Festival International de Cine de Gijón, and the Light in Motion Award for Best Short Film at the 2013 Foyle Film Festival. It also won the Silver Medal in the Foreign Category at the 2013 Student Academy Awards, and was later nominated for the Academy Award for Best Live Action Short Film in 2015, losing to The Phone Call.

=== Critical response ===
Variety described Parvaneh as a "sensitive Swiss-made graduation film" that invites audiences to empathize with its protagonist.

== Festival screenings ==
The film premiered in June 2012. It was later screened at festivals including the 2015 Jerusalem Film Festival, the 2015 Washington, DC International Film Festival, the 2015 Festival International du Film Oriental de Genève, the 2018 Clermont-Ferrand International Short Film Festival, and the 2019 Busan International Short Film Festival.
