= 1958 in animation =

Events in 1958 in animation.

== Events ==
=== January ===
- January 3: Hanna-Barbera's Tom and Jerry cartoon Happy Go Ducky, produced by MGM's Cartoon Studio, premieres.
- January 4: Robert McKimson's cartoon Don't Axe Me premieres, produced by Warner Bros. Cartoons. Starring Daffy Duck, Elmer Fudd, & Barnyard Dawg (named Rover in this short).
- January 18: Robert McKimson's Speedy Gonzales cartoon Tortilla Flaps, produced by Warner Bros. Cartoons, premieres.

=== February ===
- February 1: Friz Freleng's Bugs Bunny cartoon Hare-Less Wolf premieres, produced by Warner Bros. Cartoons.
- February 22: Friz Freleng's Tweety and Sylvester cartoon A Pizza Tweety-Pie premieres, produced by Warner Bros. Cartoons. Also starring Granny.

=== March ===
- March 7: Hanna-Barbera's Tom and Jerry cartoon Royal Cat Nap, produced by MGM's Cartoon Studio, premieres.
- March 8: Chuck Jones' Robin Hood Daffy, produced by Warner Bros. Cartoons, is first released. It stars Daffy Duck and Porky Pig. This is Jones' final short starring Porky.
- March 26: 30th Academy Awards: The Tweety and Sylvester cartoon Birds Anonymous by Friz Freleng wins the Academy Award for Best Animated Short.
- March 29: Chuck Jones' Hare-Way to the Stars, produced by Warner Bros. Cartoons, premieres. It stars Bugs Bunny and Marvin the Martian.

=== April ===
- April 12: Chuck Jones' Wile E. Coyote and Road Runner cartoon Whoa, Be-Gone!, produced by Warner Bros. Cartoons, is first released.

=== May ===
- May 2: Hanna-Barbera's Tom and Jerry cartoon The Vanishing Duck, produced by MGM's Cartoon Studio, premieres. This is Quacker's final appearance in the golden age of animation.
- May 10: Robert McKimson's cartoon Feather Bluster premieres, produced by Warner Bros. Cartoons, starring Foghorn Leghorn and Barnyard Dawg. The short features footage from McKimson's previous Foghorn Leghorn cartoons, such as: Henhouse Henery,The High and the Flighty, & All Fowled Up.
- May 31: Robert McKimson's Bugs Bunny cartoon Now Hare This, produced by Warner Bros. Cartoons, premieres.

=== June ===
- June 6: Hanna-Barbera's Tom and Jerry cartoon Robin Hoodwinked, produced by MGM's Cartoon Studio, premieres. This is Tuffy's final appearance in the golden age of animation.
- June 28 Chuck Jones' cartoon "To Itch His Own" premieres produced by Warner Bros. Cartoons, It marks the final cartoon scored by Carl Stalling before his retirement.

=== August ===
- August 1:
  - Les Clark's Paul Bunyan, produced by the Walt Disney Company, premieres.
  - William Hanna & Joseph Barbera's final Tom and Jerry cartoon short Tot Watchers premieres, it is also the last animated short overall to be produced by MGM's Cartoon Studio as it has closed down the previous year.
- August 22: Karel Zeman's The Fabulous World of Jules Verne premieres.
- August 23: Friz Freleng's Knighty Knight Bugs premieres, produced by Warner Bros. Cartoons and starring Bugs Bunny and Yosemite Sam. It is the only Bugs Bunny short to win an Academy Award.

=== September ===
- September 6:
  - The first episode of The Adventures of Spunky and Tadpole is broadcast.
  - Robert McKimson's cartoon Weasel While You Work premieres, produced by Warner Bros. Cartoons, starring Foghorn Leghorn and Barnyard Dawg.
- September 27: Friz Freleng's Tweety and Sylvester cartoon A Bird in a Bonnet premieres, produced by Warner Bros. Cartoons. Also starring Granny.
- September 29: The first episode of The Huckleberry Hound Show is broadcast, produced by Hanna-Barbera. It marks the debut of Huckleberry Hound, Yogi Bear, Hokey Wolf and Pixie and Dixie and Mr. Jinks (their segment debuts on 2 October).

=== October ===
- October 11: Chuck Jones' Wile E. Coyote and Road Runner cartoon Hook, Line and Stinker, produced by Warner Bros. Cartoons, is first released.
- October 22: Taiji Yabushita and Kazuhiko Okabe's The White Snake Enchantress is first released. It is Toei Animation's feature debut and the first anime feature film in color. The film pushed Japanese animation technology to the limit. The film was a large scale major project, involving a total of 13,590 staff; surprisingly, it only took eight months to finish. The film is an adaptation of the Chinese tale Legend of the White Snake. The decision of a Chinese story being used as the concept blueprint came from Toei's president Hiroshi Ōkawa, who wanted to strike a tone of reconciliation with the Asian neighbors.

=== November ===
- November 1: Robert McKimson's Bugs Bunny and Elmer Fudd cartoon Pre-Hysterical Hare premieres, produced by Warner Bros. Cartoons. Elmer is voiced by Dave Barry in this short instead of Arthur Q. Bryan.
- November 15: Robert McKimson's cartoon Gopher Broke premieres, produced by Warner Bros. Cartoons. Starring the Goofy Gophers and Barnyard Dawg.

=== December ===
- December 6: Chuck Jones' Wile E. Coyote and Road Runner cartoon Hip Hip-Hurry!, produced by Warner Bros. Cartoons, is first released.
- December 19: The Disney Christmas special, From All of Us to All of You, is first broadcast. In the Nordic countries (Iceland, Denmark, Norway, Sweden and Finland) it will become an annual Christmas TV tradition from 1959 onwards.
- December 20: Chuck Jones' cartoon Cat Feud premieres, produced by Warner Bros. Cartoons. Starring Claude Cat and the final appearances of Marc Antony and Pussyfoot in the Golden Age of Animation.

=== Specific date unknown ===
- The first episode of Bozo: The World's Most Famous Clown is broadcast, an animated TV series based on Bozo the Clown.
- French editorial cartoonist Jean Bosc collaborates with Claude Choubli and Jean Vautrin on the animated short Le Voyage en Boscavie.

== Films released ==
- April 4 - The Creation of the World (France and Czechoslovakia)
- August - The Fabulous World of Jules Verne (Czechoslovakia)
- October 22 - The White Snake Enchantress (Japan)
- Specific date unknown:
  - Beloved Beauty (Soviet Union)
  - The Picchiatelli (Italy)

== Television series ==
- September 6 - The Adventures of Spunky and Tadpole debuts in syndication.
- September 29: The Huckleberry Hound Show, Yogi Bear, and Pixie and Dixie and Mr. Jinks debut in syndication.
- Specific date unknown
  - Bozo: The World's Most Famous Clown debuts in syndication.
  - The Space Explorers debuts on WWOR-TV.

== Births ==
=== January ===
- January 3: Simon Greenall, English actor (voice of Captain Barnacles in Octonauts, Eemak and Thongo in Early Man, Terry in Thunderbirds Are Go).
- January 4:
  - Matt Frewer, Canadian actor, singer and comedian (voice of Panic in the Hercules franchise and House of Mouse, the title character in The Pink Panther, The Leader in The Incredible Hulk, The Exterminator in The Itsy Bitsy Spider, Mac Duff in Tiny Toon Adventures, Sidney Debris in the Batman: The Animated Series episode "The Man Who Killed Batman", Chaos in the Aladdin episode "When Chaos Come Calling").
  - Julian Sands, English actor (voice of Valmont in Jackie Chan Adventures, Lancelot in the Biker Mice from Mars episode "Knights of the Round Table", Henry in the Adventures from the Book of Virtues episode "Responsibility", Creed in The Real Adventures of Jonny Quest episode "Race Against Danger"), (d. 2023).
- January 20: Lorenzo Lamas, American actor (voice of Cale Oosha in Invasion America, Meap in Phineas and Ferb, Security Guard in the American Dad! episode "Big Stan on Campus").
- January 21:
  - Jean-Yves Raimbaud, French animator and screenwriter (creator of Space Goofs and Oggy and the Cockroaches), (d. 1998).
  - Michael Wincott, Canadian actor (voice of Scroop in Treasure Planet).
- January 26: Ellen DeGeneres, American comedian, television host, actress (voice of Dory in Finding Nemo and Finding Dory, herself in The Simpsons episode "Judge Me Tender"), writer and producer (Green Eggs and Ham, Little Ellen).
- January 28: Chris Ledesma, American music editor (The Simpsons, The Critic, Annabelle's Wish, Mission Hill), (d. 2022).
- January 29: Alastair Duncan, Scottish actor (voice of Alfred Pennyworth in The Batman and Batman Unlimited, Vulture in Avengers Assemble and Spider-Man).

=== February ===
- February 1: William Dufris, American actor and audiobook narrator (American dub voice of the title character in Bob the Builder), (d. 2020).
- February 5: Christopher Shea, American former child actor (voice of Linus Van Pelt in A Charlie Brown Christmas, Charlie Brown's All Stars!, It's the Great Pumpkin, Charlie Brown, You're in Love, Charlie Brown and He's Your Dog, Charlie Brown), (d. 2010).
- February 7: Kevin Schon, American actor (voice of Timon in Timon & Pumbaa, House of Mouse, and The Lion Guard, Pongo in 101 Dalmatians: The Series, Otto in the Ben 10: Omniverse episode "OTTO Motives").
- February 13: Donal Gibson, American actor and brother of Mel Gibson (voice of John Smith in Pocahontas II: Journey to a New World, Captain Boomerang in Justice League Unlimited).
- February 14: Kelly Armstrong, Canadian-American animator (The Care Bears Family, The Adventures of Teddy Ruxpin, Dennis the Menace, The Wild Puffalumps, The Ren & Stimpy Show), storyboard artist (2 Stupid Dogs, The Baby Huey Show, The New Woody Woodpecker Show, The Proud Family, Nickelodeon Animation Studio, Pretzel and the Puppies), art director (The Baby Huey Show), writer (The Baby Huey Show, Space Goofs, My Life as a Teenage Robot), sheet timer (What a Cartoon!, Ren & Stimpy "Adult Party Cartoon", Robotboy), producer (The Baby Huey Show, Ren & Stimpy "Adult Party Cartoon", The Haunted World of El Superbeasto) and director (The Ren & Stimpy Show, 2 Stupid Dogs, The Baby Huey Show, The Oblongs, co-founder of Carbunkle Cartoons).
- February 16: Ice-T, American rapper and actor (voice of Peggy in UglyDolls, Garbage Khan in the Bubble Guppies episode "A Load of Litterbugs!", Ramrod in the Batman Beyond episode "Splicers").
- February 19: Gary Sperling, American television writer (Disney Television Animation), (d. 2003).
- February 21:
  - Denise Dowse, American actress and director (voice of Officer Shirley in Rocket Power, Sheila Swann in the Rugrats episode "Tommy for Mayor"), (d. 2022).
  - Jake Steinfeld, American actor, fitness personality, entrepreneur, and producer (voice of Farmyard Bully and Max the Bouncer in Rock-a-Doodle, Git in Ratatouille, Fish Seller in From Up on Poppy Hill, Thunder in the King of the Hill episode "Dia-BILL-ic Shock").
  - Kim Coates, Canadian-American actor (voice of Hector in Rapunzel's Tangled Adventure, Biker in the Corner Gas Animated episode "Pots and Plans").
- February 23: Norm Spencer, Canadian actor (voice of Cyclops in X-Men: The Animated Series), (d. 2020).
- February 24: Chris Buck, American film director (Surf's Up, Walt Disney Animation Studios).
- February 26:
  - Chris Phillips, American voice actor and musician (voice of Face for the Nick Jr. Channel, continued voice of Roger Klotz in Doug, announcer for Cartoon Network).
  - Greg Germann, American actor (voice of the Agent in Bolt).

=== March ===
- March 4: Patricia Heaton, American actress, model and comedian (portrayed Woman Fan in Space Jam, voice of Edith in The Star, Mama Bear in Smallfoot, Lunch Lady in the Danny Phantom episode "Mystery Meat").
- March 7:
  - Norihiro Inoue, Japanese voice actor (voice of Schneizel el Britannia in Code Geass, Taichi Hiraga Keaton in Master Keaton, Marco in Gunslinger Girl, Atlas in Metropolis), (d. 2022).
  - Rik Mayall, English actor (voice of Prince Froglip in The Princess and the Goblin, Brigand in The Thief and the Cobbler, Cacofonix in Asterix Conquers America, The Robber King in The Snow Queen, Mr. Toad in The Wind in the Willows, Narrator in Jellabies, Kehaar in Watership Down, King Arthur in King Arthur's Disasters, Cufflingk in Valiant, Lord Reginold in the SpongeBob SquarePants episode "Chimps Ahoy", Seven Dwarfs in Snow White: The Sequel), (d. 2014).
- March 10: Sharon Stone, American actress (voice of Princess Bala in Antz, the Narrator in The Sissy Duckling and Harold and the Purple Crayon, Puffy in A Warrior's Tail, the title character in the Happily Ever After: Fairy Tales for Every Child episode "Henny Penny", Nicki in the Higglytown Heroes episode "Twinkle's Masterpiece").
- March 13: Drew Graybeal, American animator, background artist (Ben 10, Camp Candy, Captain N: The Game Master, COPS, RoboCop: Alpha Commando, The Real Ghostbusters, The Tick) and prop designer (The Super Mario Bros. Super Show!).
- March 14: Eddie Sotto, American artist and animator (One Saturday Morning), (d. 2025).
- March 15: Deb Lacusta, American actress (voice of Isabella in The Simpsons episode "Havana Wild Weekend", additional voices in Back to the Future) and television writer (The Simpsons).
- March 19:
  - Robin Hurlstone, British actor (voice of Walter Boggis in Fantastic Mr. Fox), (d. 2026).
  - Fred Stoller, American actor and comedian (voice of Chuck the Evil Sandwich-Making Guy in WordGirl, Rusty in Handy Manny, Leo Shallenhammer in Central Park, Bartleburt in Harvey Beaks, Fred in The Penguins of Madagascar, Molecule Man in The Super Hero Squad Show, Stanley in Open Season 2, Mr. Beaker in All Grown Up!).
- March 20: Holly Hunter, American actress (voice of Helen Parr/Elastigirl in The Incredibles franchise, Marjune Gamble in Bless the Harts).
- March 21:
  - Brad Hall, American actor, comedian and filmmaker (voice of grasshopper in A Bug's Life).
  - Gary Oldman, English actor and filmmaker (voice of Lord Ruber in Quest for Camelot, General Grawl in Planet 51, Bob Cratchit, Jacob Marley, and Tiny Tim in A Christmas Carol, Lord Shen in Kung Fu Panda 2).
- March 23: Michael Sorich, American actor (voice of various characters in the Digimon franchise, Don Kanonji and Tessai Tsukabishi in Bleach, Cyborg 007 in Cyborg 009, Grandpa Hino in the Viz Media dub of Sailor Moon, Kamidake in the Tenchi Muyo! franchise, Master Pharaoh 90 in Sailor Moon Crystal), writer and director (Idaten Jump, Bobobo-bo Bo-bobo).
- March 27: Eddy Houchins, American animator (The Chipmunk Adventure, Beetlejuice, Rover Dangerfield, Beauty and the Beast, I Want a Dog for Christmas, Charlie Brown, He's a Bully, Charlie Brown), storyboard artist (Disney Television Animation, A Flintstones Christmas Carol, Darkstalkers, Courage the Cowardly Dog, Tom and Jerry: The Fast and the Furry, Danger Rangers, LeapFrog, Hoops & Yoyo Ruin Christmas, Henry Hugglemonster, Be Cool, Scooby-Doo!), sheet timer (Warner Bros. Animation, Disney Television Animation, Courage the Cowardly Dog, Balto II: Wolf Quest, Codename: Kids Next Door, Clifford's Really Big Movie, Stripperella, Film Roman, Cartoon Network Studios, The Mighty B!, Random! Cartoons, LeapFrog, Stretch Armstrong and the Flex Fighters), lip sync artist (The Ren & Stimpy Show), writer (Phineas and Ferb), producer (Timon & Pumbaa) and director (Disney Television Animation, Scooby-Doo! in Arabian Nights, A Flintstones Christmas Carol, The Mummy, Cartoon Network Studios).
- March 28: Amy Pascal, American film producer and business executive (Spider-Man: Into the Spider-Verse, Spider-Man: Across the Spider-Verse).
- March 30: Maurice LaMarche, Canadian voice actor, comedian, and impressionist (voice of the Brain and Squit in the Animaniacs franchise, Etno Polino in Space Goofs, Hovis in Catscratch, Egon Spengler in The Real Ghostbusters and Extreme Ghostbusters, Hugh Tasmanian Devil in Taz-Mania, Big Bob Pataki in Hey Arnold!, Dizzy Devil in Tiny Toon Adventures, Popeye in Popeye and Son, Inspector Gadget in Gadget & the Gadgetinis, Vincent Van Ghoul in the Scooby-Doo franchise, Calculon in Futurama, Father in Codename: Kids Next Door, Mr. Big in the Zootopia franchise, King Agnarr in Frozen, Root Beer Tapper in Wreck-It Ralph and Ralph Breaks the Internet, Grumpy in The 7D, Longhorn in Freakazoid!, Chancellor Neighsay in My Little Pony: Friendship is Magic, continued voice of Yosemite Sam and Mortimer Mouse).
- March 31: Lisa Michelson, American voice actress (English dub voice of Satsuki Kusakabe in My Neighbor Totoro and Kiki in Kiki's Delivery Service), (d. 1991).

=== April ===
- April 3: Alec Baldwin, American actor (voice of the Narrator in Thomas & Friends, Leonardo Leonardo in Clerks: The Animated Series, Captain Gray Edwards in Final Fantasy: The Spirits Within, Dennis in The SpongeBob SquarePants Movie, Makunga in Madagascar: Escape 2 Africa, Nicholas St. North in Rise of the Guardians, the title character in The Boss Baby and The Boss Baby: Family Business, PB in Arctic Dogs, Future Timmy in The Fairly OddParents episode "Channel Chasers", Caleb Thorn in The Simpsons episode "The Bonfire of the Manatees", himself in The Simpsons episode "When You Dish Upon a Star" and the Johnny Bravo episode "Johnny Bravo Goes to Hollywood").
- April 4:
  - Constance Shulman, American actress (voice of Patti Mayonnaise in Doug, Milly Sparkles in the Star vs. the Forces of Evil episode "The Bounce Lounge", Dr. Sphinxen in the OK K.O.! Let's Be Heroes episode "Radical Rescue").
  - Alison Snowden, English animator, voice actress (voice of Margaret Fish in Bob's Birthday and Bob and Margaret, Polly The Parrot and Auntie Pig in Peppa Pig), screenwriter (Shaun the Sheep) and producer (George and Rosemary, In and Out, Bob's Birthday, Animal Behaviour, co-creator of Bob and Margaret and Ricky Sprocket: Showbiz Boy).
- April 6:
  - Mark Henn, American animator (Walt Disney Animation Studios).
  - Peter Del Vecho, American film producer (Walt Disney Animation Studios).
- April 10:
  - Mike Lazzo, American former television producer (Cartoon Network, founder of Williams Street).
  - Sophie Faucher, Canadian actress (Canadian dub voice of Yzma in The Emperor's New Groove and Kronk's New Groove, Morgana in The Little Mermaid II: Return to the Sea, Prudence in Cinderella III: A Twist in Time), (d. 2026).
- April 12: Michael Marcantel, American animator, storyboard artist (The Simpsons, Sit Down, Shut Up, Allen Gregory, Beavis and Butt-Head, Futurama) and director (The Simpsons).
- April 21: Yoshito Usui, Japanese manga artist (creator of Crayon Shin-chan), (d. 2009).
- April 26:
  - Paul St. Peter, American actor (voice of Punch in Cowboy Bebop, Mondego in Gankutsuou: The Count of Monte Cristo, Kurama in Naruto, Razor in Hunter x Hunter, Yammy in Bleach, Jorgun in Gurren Lagann, Higa in Durarara!!, various characters in the Digimon franchise, Wang Fu in Miraculous: Tales of Ladybug & Cat Noir).
  - Giancarlo Esposito, Danish-born American actor (voice of Faraday in Cyberpunk: Edgerunners, Lex Luthor in Harley Quinn, Phantom Blot in DuckTales, Black Spider in Batman: Assault on Arkham, Ra's al Ghul in Son of Batman).
- April 29:
  - Michelle Pfeiffer, American actress (voice of Tzipporah in The Prince of Egypt, Eris in Sinbad: Legend of the Seven Seas, Mindy Simmons in The Simpsons episode "The Last Temptation of Homer").
  - Savage Steve Holland, American animator, cartoonist, voice director, producer and director (Out of Jimmy's Head, The Fairly OddParents, Kirby Buckets, co-creator and voice of Doc Tari and Elmo the Elk in Eek! The Cat, co-creator of Sabrina: The Animated Series).

=== May ===
- May 14: Dame Jools Topp, New Zealand musician and comedian (voice of Sue Witherwax in The Barefoot Bandits episode "Terracotta Terror"), (d. 2026).
- May 16; Donald Fullilove, American actor (voice of Michael Jackson in The Jackson 5ive, Diz/Randy in Kid Power, Jason Phillips in Emergency +4, Doughnut in Osmosis Jones, CDA Agent in Monsters, Inc., Train Pull Foreman in Spirit: Stallion of the Cimarron, Animal Control Man in Curious George, Axiom Passenger #7 in WALL-E, Gorilla Guard #1 in Kung Fu Panda: Secrets of the Masters).
- May 20:
  - Jorgen Klubien, Danish animator, storyboard artist, and writer (Walt Disney Animation Studios, Pixar).
  - Judy Kuhn, American singer (singing voice of Pocahontas in Pocahontas, Pocahontas II: Journey to a New World, and Once Upon a Studio, Princess Su in Mulan II).
  - Jane Wiedlin, American musician and actress (voice of Dusk in the Scooby-Doo franchise, Gwen in Mission Hill, Vanity White in Pinky, Elmyra, & the Brain, Phaedra in The Wild Thornberrys, Miranda Kane and Shannon in The New Batman Adventures, Hope Rodgers in the As Told by Ginger episode "No Hope for Courtney", Cassiopeia in the Duck Dodgers episode "They Stole Dodgers' Brain").
  - Nurhasanah Iskandar, Indonesian actress (dub voice of the title character in Doraemon), (d. 2020).
- May 23:
  - Drew Carey, American actor, comedian and game show host (voice of Crank in Robots, Hal in the King of the Hill episode "Not in My Back-hoe", himself in the Baby Blues episode "Bizzy Moves In", The Simpsons episodes "All About Lisa" and "Treehouse of Horror XXVII", and the Family Guy episode "New Kidney in Town").
  - Lea Delaria, American comedian, actress and jazz artist (voice of Miss Fritter in Cars 3, EJ in Clarence, Molly Yarnchopper in Kipo and the Age of Wonderbeasts).
- May 26: Howard Goodall, English composer (Mr. Bean: The Animated Series).
- May 29: Karen Maruyama, American actress and comedian (voice of Shao Lin in Captain Simian & the Space Monkeys, Kim in the Static Shock episode "Grounded", Tsukuri in the Justice League episode "Fury").
- May 30: Ted McGinley, American actor (voice of Denny Clay in Transformers: Robots in Disguise, Helicopter Rental Agent in the Family Guy episode "Road to Rupert", Aquaman in the Batman: The Brave and the Bold episode "Mitefall!").
- May 31: Tim Hill, American film director and writer (Garfield 2, Alvin and the Chipmunks, Hop).

=== June ===
- June 3: Suzie Plakson, American actress (voice of Vivian Vixen in the Johnny Bravo episode "Under the Big Flop", Ann Edie in the Men in Black: The Series episode "The Sonic Boom Syndrome", Romano in the Family Guy episode "The Son Also Draws", Amazonian in the Futurama episode "Amazon Women in the Mood").
- June 15: Wade Boggs, American former professional baseball baseman (voiced himself in The Simpsons episode "Homer at the Bat").
- June 17: Bobby Farrelly, American film director, screenwriter, and producer (Osmosis Jones, Ozzy & Drix).
- June 18: Floro Dery, Filipino illustrator (The Transformers).
- June 19: Makiko Futaki, Japanese animator and illustrator (Studio Ghibli), (d. 2016).
- June 22: Bruce Campbell, American actor and director (voice of Magnanimous in Megas XLR, Chicken Bittle in Aqua Teen Hunger Force Colon Movie Film For Theaters, Thompson in Hubert's Brain, Captain Shuggazoom in Super Robot Monkey Team Hyperforce Go!, Mayor Shelbourne in Cloudy with a Chance of Meatballs, Rod "Torque" Redline in Cars 2, King Edmund in Rapunzel's Tangled Adventure).
- June 24: Tommy Lister Jr., American actor and professional wrestler (voice of Finnick in Zootopia, Mr. Mussels in Fish Hooks, Bobby in Regular Show, Filbert Slowlove in The Boondocks episode "The New Black"), (d. 2020).

=== July ===
- July 6: Jennifer Saunders, English actress, comedienne, and musician (voice of Fairy Godmother in Shrek 2, April Spink in Coraline, Elizabeth II in Minions, Nana Noodleman in Sing and Sing 2, Mymble in Moominvalley, Phoebe in The Simpsons episode "Looking for Mr. Goodbart", Helen Shelby in the Thunderbirds Are Go episode "Deep Water").
- July 8: Kevin Bacon, American actor (voice of the title character in Balto, Ren McCormack in the Robot Chicken episode "Beastmaster and Commander", himself in the God, the Devil and Bob episode "Bob Gets Involved").
- July 10: Fiona Shaw, Irish actress (voice of Halcon in the 3Below: Tales of Arcadia episode "Flying the Coop", Hedwin in the Penn Zero: Part-Time Hero episode "Mr. Rippen").
- July 13: Roger L. Jackson, American voice actor (voice of Mojo Jojo and Butch in The Powerpuff Girls, Ghostface in the Robot Chicken episode "That Hurts Me", Mel Gibson and Groucho Marx in Celebrity Deathmatch).
- July 14: Scott Rudin, American film producer (South Park: Bigger, Longer & Uncut, Team America: World Police, Fantastic Mr. Fox, Isle of Dogs).
- July 25: Thurston Moore, American musician, guitarist and member of Sonic Youth (voiced himself in The Simpsons episode "Homerpalooza").
- July 27: Vincenzo Nicoli, British actor (voice of Lorenzo and Beppe in Thomas & Friends).
- July 31: Wally Kurth, American actor (voice of Agent Six in Generator Rex, Tamasaburo in Pom Poko).

=== August ===
- August 11: Googy Gress, American actor (voice of Duncan Douglas in Freakazoid!, Bouncing Boy in the Justice League Unlimited episode "Far From Home", Shark in The Batman episode "Attack of the Terrible Trio", Buss in The Zeta Project episode "Wired").
- August 12: Barry Cook, American film director (Mulan, Arthur Christmas).
- August 15: Roger Rose, American actor (voice of Carbone in Duckman, Kent Powers in Quack Pack, Juan in Codename: Kids Next Door, Superman and Amazo in Batman: The Brave and the Bold, Doctor Strange in The Super Hero Squad Show, David Letterman in the Pinky and the Brain episode "TV or Not TV").
- August 16: Angela Bassett, American actress (voice of Ana Spanikopita in BoJack Horseman, Dorothea Williams in Soul, Mildred Duffy in Meet the Robinsons, Delia Woodman in Our Friend, Martin, Ramonda in the What If...? episode "What If... Killmonger Rescued Tony Stark?", Michelle Obama in The Simpsons episode "Stealing First Base", Decoy in Moon Girl and Devil Dinosaur).
- August 18:
  - Reg E. Cathey, American actor (voice of Captain Quaid in Rapunzel's Tangled Adventure), (d. 2018).
  - Steven Zirnkilton, American politician and actor (voice of Reporter in The Rugrats Movie, Narrator in the Duckman episode "Das Sub" and the Family Guy episode "Fast Times at Buddy Cianci Jr. High").
- August 22: Bobby Mackston, American music editor (King of the Hill), sound editor (Film Roman, Adelaide Productions, The PJs, Futurama, Good Vibes, The Freak Brothers, Beavis and Butt-Head) and re-recording mixer (King of the Hill, Men in Black: The Series, Roughnecks: Starship Troopers Chronicles, The PJs, The Goode Family, Good Vibes).
- August 25: Tim Burton, American film director, producer, artist, writer, animator, puppeteer, and actor (The Nightmare Before Christmas, James and the Giant Peach, Corpse Bride, 9, Frankenweenie, Vincent, Tron, the Amazing Stories episode "The Family Dog", Beetlejuice, Stainboy, The Lord of the Rings, Stay Tuned, Walt Disney Animation Studios).
- August 28: Scott Hamilton, American figure skater and Olympic gold medalist (voice of Buzz in Nine Dog Christmas, himself in the King of the Hill episode "Dances with Dogs" and The Fairly OddParents episode "The Fairly Oddlympics").
- August 29: Michael Jackson, American singer, songwriter and dancer (voice of Leon Kompowsky in The Simpsons episode "Stark Raving Dad"), (d. 2009).
- August 30: Sarah Watt, Australian film director and animator (The Way of the Birds), (d. 2011).
- August 31: Julie Brown, American actress, comedian, television writer and director, and singer-songwriter (voice of Minerva Mink in Animaniacs, Saleen in Aladdin, Julie Bruin in the Tiny Toon Adventures episode "Tiny Toon Music Television", Camp Counselor in The Addams Family episode "Camp Addams", Lottie Bolonga in the Happily Ever After: Fairy Tales for Every Child episode "The Three Little Pigs", Zatanna in the Batman: The Animated Series episode "Zatanna").

=== September ===
- September 3: Kevin Kiner, American composer (Happily Ever After: Fairy Tales for Every Child, Duckman, Harold and the Purple Crayon, Stuart Little, Lucasfilm Animation, Transformers: Robots in Disguise).
- September 6: Jeff Foxworthy, American actor, comedian, writer, producer, radio personality and author (voice of Lyle in The Fox and the Hound 2, Linberg in The Aviators, Handy Smurf in The Smurfs and The Smurfs 2, Babe in Bunyan and Babe, Southern Meap in the Phineas and Ferb episode "Meapless in Seattle", himself in the Scooby-Doo and Guess Who? episode "The Wedding Witch of Wainsly Hall!").
- September 8: Stevie Vallance, Canadian actress and musician (voice of Proud Heart Cat, Share Bear and True Heart Bear in Care Bears, Party, Prize, Puffball and Punkity in Popples, G.L.A.D.I.S. in Totally Spies!, Miss Possum in Adventures of Sonic the Hedgehog, Dixie Kong in Donkey Kong Country, singing voice of Sonia in Sonic Underground).
- September 10: Chris Columbus, American filmmaker (Galaxy High, Little Nemo: Adventures in Slumberland, Scoob!, Night at the Museum: Kahmunrah Rises Again).
- September 11:
  - Scott Patterson, American actor (voice of King Faraday in Justice League Unlimited, Jim Gordon in Batman: Gotham by Gaslight).
  - Klay Hall, American animator (Mighty Mouse: The New Adventures, A Wish for Wings That Work, Cool World, Family Dog), storyboard artist (The Simpsons, King of the Hill), character designer (King of the Hill), sheet timer (Film Roman), writer (Tinker Bell and the Lost Treasure, Planes) and director (Family Dog, Film Roman, Father of the Pride, Tinker Bell and the Lost Treasure, Planes).
- September 16: Jennifer Tilly, American-Canadian actress (voice of Celia Mae in the Monsters, Inc. franchise, Bonnie Swanson in Family Guy, Grace in Home on the Range, herself in The Simpsons episode "Gone Abie Gone").
- September 19: Richard Ridings, English actor (portrayed Angelo in Who Framed Roger Rabbit, voice of King Windham and Button in The Princess and the Pea, Daddy Pig in Peppa Pig, Hamish in Chuggington, Bob Gray in the Thunderbirds Are Go episode "Night and Day").
- September 21: Johnny Hardwick, American television producer, writer, and voice actor (King of the Hill), (d. 2023).
- September 22: Joan Jett, American musician (voice of Sunshine Justice in the Steven Universe episode "The Big Show", Camille in the Kipo and the Age of Wonderbeasts episode "Cactus Town").
- September 24: Kevin Sorbo, American actor (voice of Ka-Zar in The Super Hero Squad Show, Hercules in Hercules and Xena – The Animated Movie: The Battle for Mount Olympus).
- September 25: Michael Madsen, American actor (voice of Kilowog in Green Lantern: First Flight, Duke in Arctic Dogs, Kevin Costner in the Bob's Burgers episode "Moody Foodie"), (d. 2025).
- September 29: Lissa Kapstrom, American television producer and writer (Nickelodeon Animation Studio, The Tom and Jerry Show, Abby Hatcher, Rainbow Butterfly Unicorn Kitty).

=== October ===
- October 5: Neil deGrasse Tyson, American astrophysicist, author and science communicator (voice of Neil deBuck Weasel in Ice Age: Collision Course and Scrat: Spaced Out, Main Title Narrator in Miles from Tomorrowland, Smart Waddles in the Gravity Falls episode "Little Gift Shop of Horrors", Planetarium Narrator in the BoJack Horseman episode "That's Too Much, Man!", himself in the Martha Speaks episode "Eyes on the Skies", the Future-Worm! episode "Long Live Captain Cakerz!", The Simpsons episode "The Caper Chase", the Scooby-Doo and Guess Who? episode "Space Station Scooby!", the Regular Show episode "Terror Tales of the Park VI", and the Family Guy episodes "Scammed Yankees" and "Prescription Heroine").
- October 7: Rosalyn Landor, English actress (voice of Mum and Constance Koala in Taz-Mania, the Blue Fairy in the House of Mouse episode "Jiminy Cricket" and Teacher's Pet).
- October 11: Ron Goldstein, American composer (Warner Bros. Animation, The Hunchback of Notre Dame II, Mickey's Once Upon a Christmas).
- October 13: Charity James, American actress (voice of Kelly Generic in Bobby's World, Roxy Rocket in the DC Animated Universe, Elsie Chapman in Godzilla: The Series, Lily in Wild West C.O.W.-Boys of Moo Mesa, Fatima in the Aladdin episode "Seems Like Old Crimes", Roxanne in the Max Steel episode "Turbulence", Ekidna in the Gargoyles episode "The New Olympians").
- October 22: Michael Price, American screenwriter and producer (Aaahh!!! Real Monsters, Santo Bugito, Bruno the Kid, Disney Television Animation, The PJs, The Simpsons, The Simpsons Movie, Lego Star Wars Series and Specials, co-creator of F Is for Family).

=== November ===
- November 1: Will Finn, American voice actor (voice of Hollywood Fish in Chicken Little, Floyd and Carl in Rock Dog) and animator (Walt Disney Animation Studios, Sullivan Bluth Studios, Pinocchio and the Emperor of the Night, Happily Ever After).
- November 5: Robert Patrick, American actor (voice of Race Bannon in The Real Adventures of Jonny Quest, Master Piandao in Avatar: The Last Airbender, Hawkman in The Batman, Whizzer in the Ultimate Spider-Man episode "S.H.I.E.L.D. Academy", Phil Billings in the Ben 10 episode "Truth").
- November 6: Reid Harrison, American television producer and writer (Duckman, The Simpsons, Warner Bros. Animation, The PJs, Drawn Together, Catscratch, Celebrity Deathmatch, George of the Jungle, Tak and the Power of Juju, Alvinnn!!! and the Chipmunks, Danger Mouse, Sonic Boom, Counterfeit Cat, Angelo Rules, Disenchantment, The Smurfs), (d. 2024).
- November 8:
  - Phil Fondacaro, American actor (voice of Creeper in The Black Cauldron).
  - Maureen Mascarina, American animator (Hanna-Barbera) and storyboard artist (Nickelodeon Animation Studio, Clarence).
- November 12: Megan Mullally, American actress, comedian and singer (voice of Pearl in Fish Police, Pebbles Flintstone in I Yabba-Dabba Do! and A Flintstone Family Christmas, Miss Nettle in Sofia the First, Marilyn Driscoll in Randy Cunningham: 9th Grade Ninja, continued voice of Sarah Wiggum in The Simpsons).
- November 13: Larry Doyle, American novelist, screenwriter, and producer (Rugrats, Beavis and Butt-Head, The Simpsons, Looney Tunes: Back in Action).
- November 19:
  - Charlie Kaufman, American filmmaker and novelist (Anomalisa).
  - Terrence C. Carson, American actor (voice of Mace Windu in the Star Wars franchise, Ra's al Ghul in Justice League vs. Teen Titans).
- November 21: Paul Schoeffler, Canadian actor (voice of various characters in Courage the Cowardly Dog, Spider's Dad and Walking Stick in The Bug Diaries).
- November 22: Jamie Lee Curtis, American actress, producer, author, and activist (voice of Queen Camilla in Rudolph the Red-Nosed Reindeer and the Island of Misfit Toys, Beverly in The Little Engine That Could, Ryoko Matsuzaki in From Up on Poppy Hill, Peregrine Bruchstein in Archer).
- November 27: Mike Scioscia, American former baseball catcher and manager (voiced himself in The Simpsons episodes "Homer at the Bat", and "Money Bart").

=== December ===
- December 6: Nick Park, English animator, writer, producer and director (Chicken Run, Early Man, creator of Wallace & Gromit).
- December 10: David Paul Grove, Canadian actor (voice of Johnny 2x4 in Ed, Edd n Eddy, Robbie the Robin in Krypto the Superdog, Morgs in Beat Bugs, additional voices in RoboCop: Alpha Commando).
- December 16: Katie Leigh, American voice actress (voice of Sunni Gummi in Adventures of the Gummi Bears, Sheila in Dungeons & Dragons, Rowlf in Muppet Babies, Honker Muddlefoot in Darkwing Duck, Alex in seasons 1 and 2 of Totally Spies, Usapyon in Yo-Kai Watch).
- December 23: Vittorio Guerrieri, Italian actor (Italian dub voice of the title character in Freakazoid!, Tod in The Fox and the Hound, 6 in 9, JFK in Clone High, Pongo in 101 Dalmatians: The Series, and Squit in Animaniacs).
- December 25: Cheryl Chase, American actress (voice of Angelica Pickles in Rugrats).
- December 29: Ray DeLaurentis, American producer and screenwriter (Warner Bros. Animation, Nickelodeon Animation Studio, Bad Dog, Pet Alien, Fresh Beat Band of Spies, Rainbow Butterfly Unicorn Kitty, Esme & Roy, The Ice Age Adventures of Buck Wild).
- December 31:
  - Bebe Neuwirth, American actress (voice of Mirage in Aladdin, Annabelle and Belladonna in All Dogs Go to Heaven: The Series, Sylvia Marpole in An Extremely Goofy Movie, Ms. Bladdar in Pepper Ann, Deadpan in the Freakazoid! episode "The Wrath of Guitierrez", Emma Glamour in the DuckTales episode "Louie's Eleven!", Marguerite Grey in the Over the Garden Wall episode "Mad Love").
  - Johnny Hardwick, American television producer, writer, and voice actor (Dale Gribble in King of the Hill), (d. 2023).
  - Tomomi Mochizuki, Japanese animator, screenwriter, and director (Studio Ghibli, Nippon Animation, Pierrot, Sunrise).

=== Specific date unknown ===
- Corrine Koslo, Canadian actress (voice of Lady Rataxes in Babar, Nikki Darling in Beverly Hills Teens, Emma Leroy in Corner Gas Animated, Agnes Rudolph in the Time Warp Trio episode "Plaid to the Bone").
- Peter de Sève, American artist (Walt Disney Animation Studios, Blue Sky Studios).
- John Stevenson, English filmmaker and puppeteer (Kung Fu Panda).
- Ron Zimmerman, American comic book writer, television producer and writer (Justice League Unlimited, The Simpsons), (d. 2022).
- Bob Forward, American writer, producer, and director (Filmation, DIC).
- Brynne Chandler, American writer and story editor (He-Man and the Masters of the Universe, Teenage Mutant Ninja Turtles, Batman: The Animated Series, Gargoyles, Spider-Man: The Animated Series).
- Tony Oliver, Puerto Rican voice actor and voice director (voice of Rick Hunter in Robotech, the title character in the Lupin the Third franchise, Lancer in Fate/stay night, Ulquiorra Cifer in Bleach).

== Deaths ==
=== April ===
- April 18: Edward H. Plumb, American film composer and orchestrator (Walt Disney Animation Studios), dies at age 50.

=== August ===
- August 1: Albert E. Smith, English-American film director, film producer, and stage magician, (co-founder of the film studio Vitagraph Studios, producer of the animated short film The Humpty Dumpty Circus), dies at age 83.
- August 22: Ted Sears, American animator (Raoul Barré, Fleischer Brothers, Walt Disney Company), lyricist and scriptwriter, dies at age 58.
- August 29: Isadore Sparber, American storyboard artist, animation writer, director and producer (Fleischer Studios, Famous Studios), dies at age 52.
- August 31: Gayne Whitman, American actor (occasional voice of Barney Bear), dies at age 68.

=== October ===
- October 4: Jack King, American animator, film director and comics artist (J.R. Bray, International Film Service, Walt Disney Company, Warner Bros. Cartoons), dies at age 72.
- October 28: Mario Pompei, Italian comics artist and animator (worked for Raul Verdini), dies at age 55.

== See also ==
- List of anime by release date (1946–1959)
