= The Tender Tale of Cinderella Penguin =

1981 Canadian animated short film

- Directed by: Janet Perlman
- Produced by: Janet Perlman
- Music by: Various artists
- Production company: National Film Board of Canada
- Release date: 1981
- Running time: 10 minutes
- Country: Canada

The Tender Tale of Cinderella Penguin is a 1981 Canadian animated short film by Janet Perlman that comically adapts the tale of Cinderella with penguins. Produced by the National Film Board of Canada, it was nominated for an Academy Award for Best Animated Short Film at the 54th Academy Awards, losing to another animated short from Montreal, Frédéric Back's Crac. The Oscar nomination was the fourth in five years for executive producer Derek Lamb, also Perlman's husband. The film also received a Parents' Choice Award.

== Plot ==
Cinderella has to stay home while her stepsisters go to the ball. The story is largely the same as the fairytale albeit with penguins replacing all the humans and the animals. The glass slippers resemble swimming flippers.

== Book adaptation ==
Perlman adapted her film into the 1992 children's book, Cinderella Penguin, published by Kids Can Press of Toronto.

== See also ==
- Bully Dance
- Why Me?
- Crac, the other 1981 Canadian animated short film that eventually won the Oscar
