= Janet Perlman =

Canadian animator, animation teacher, and author

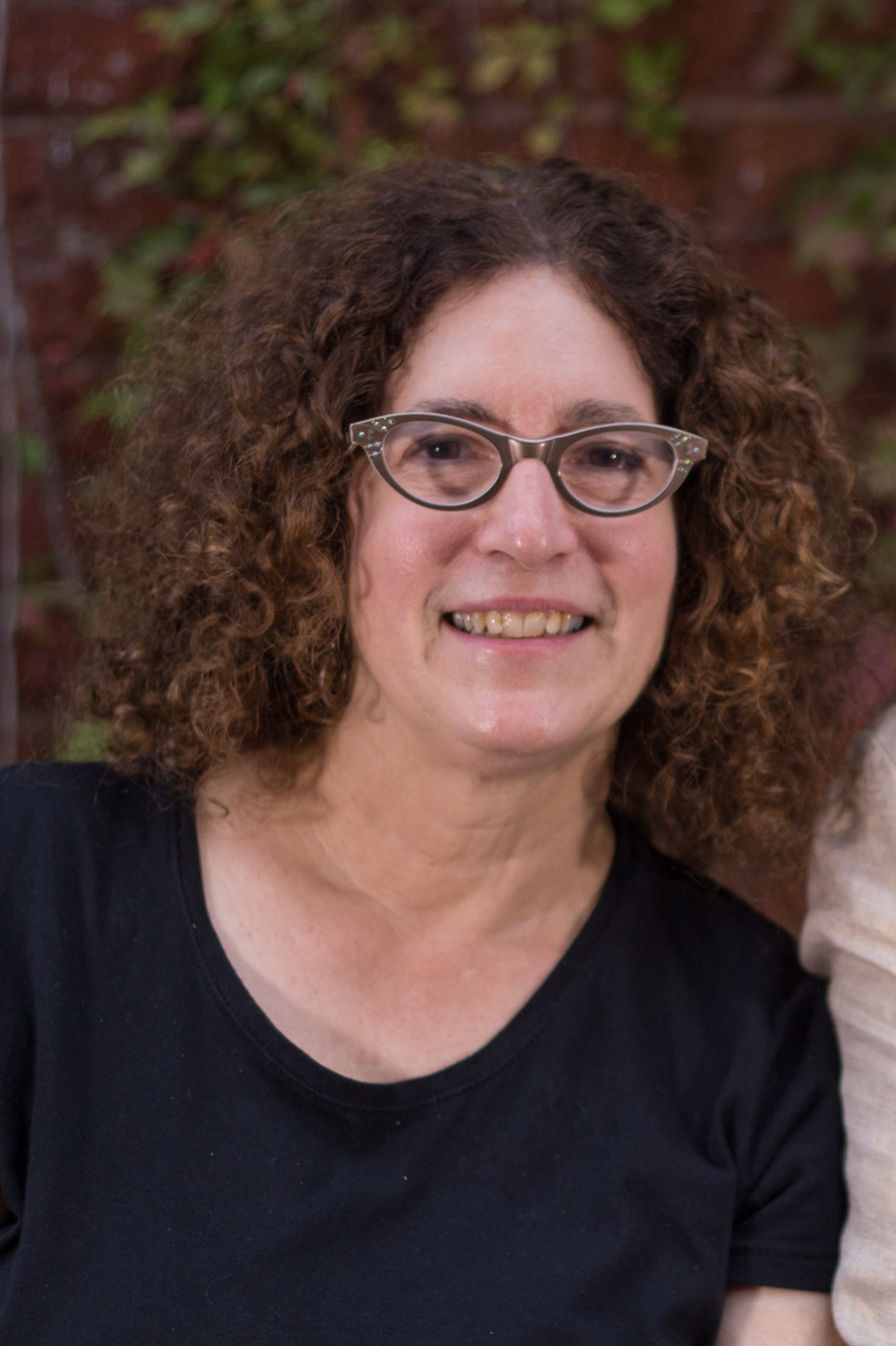
- Janet Perlman
- Born: Janet Laurie Perlman; Canada
- Occupations: Animator, author

Janet Laurie Perlman is a Canadian animator and children's book author and illustrator whose work includes the short film The Tender Tale of Cinderella Penguin, which was nominated for an Academy Award for Best Animated Short Film at the 54th Academy Awards and received a Parents' Choice Award. Her 13 short films have received 60 awards to date. She was married to the late animation producer Derek Lamb. After working with Lamb at the National Film Board of Canada in the 1980s, they formed their own production company, Lamb-Perlman Productions. She is currently a partner in Hulascope Studio, based in Montreal. Perlman has produced animation segments for Sesame Street and NOVA. Working with Lamb, she produced title sequences for the PBS series Mystery!, based on the artwork of Edward Gorey, and was one of the animators for R. O. Blechman's adaptation of The Soldier's Tale for PBS's Great Performances. She has also taught animation at Harvard University, the Rhode Island School of Design and Concordia University. She and Lamb were divorced but remained creative and business partners until his death in 2005.

== Penguin-related projects ==
Perlman has created several films and books with penguin characters. Her short film The Tender Tale of Cinderella Penguin was adapted as the children's book Cinderella Penguin. Her satirical graphic novel Penguins Behind Bars was adapted as a 2003 Hulascope/NFB animated short of the same name, which received four awards including the Platinum Award for Independent Short Subject at the WorldFest-Houston International Film Festival. The short aired on Adult Swim, Cartoon Network's late night programming block, in 2003, but was not made into a full series. She has also written and illustrated the books The Emperor Penguin's New Clothes and The Penguin and the Pea.

== National Film Board of Canada ==
In addition to The Tender Tale of Cinderella Penguin and Penguins Behind Bars, Perlman's NFB credits include the 1976 animated short Lady Fishbourne's Complete Guide to Better Table Manners, winner of first prize in the instructional films category at the Ottawa International Film Festival, and the 2005 short Invasion of the Space Lobsters, a co-production of the NFB with the Canadian Labour Congress, which is a "tongue-in-cheek look at doublespeak and bafflegab." She was an animator on The Hottest Show on Earth (1977) and co-directed Why Me? with Derek Lamb (1978), and the 2014 short film Monsieur Pug, and contributed animation work to Alison Snowden and David Fine's Oscar-winning NFB co-produced short Bob's Birthday.

=== ShowPeace Series ===
While at the NFB, Perlman developed the ShowPeace animation series conflict resolution, including her short film Bully Dance, which received thirteen awards, including the Award for Best Animated Short Film from the Children's Jury and the Grand Prix de Montréal for Best Short Film at the Festival International du film pour enfants and First Prize in short film & video animation in recognition of outstanding achievement in children's media from the Chicago International Children's Film Festival. Another of Perlman's films for the series, Dinner for Two, received a dozen awards including a Grand Prix des Amériques at the Montreal World Film Festival and a UNICEF Jury Award for Best Short Film at the Berlin International Film Festival. Dinner for Two was later adapted by Perlman as the book The Delicious Bug.

== Hulascope Studio ==
With film composer and former NFB colleague Judith Gruber-Stitzer, Perlman formed Hulascope Studio to produce animated projects for television. Penguins Behind Bars, a parody of the women in prison films of the 1950s, was co-produced by Hulascope and the NFB for Cartoon Network's Adult Swim, and co-written by Perlman with Derek Lamb.

== Other works ==
Perlman's latest film, originally entitled Llama Cookin, which was entered into the Ottawa International Animation Festival before it even existed. With the film due at the festival in just two weeks, Perlman quickly assembled Llama Cookin with animation outtakes from her computer. Unhappy with the results, she tried to withdraw the film from the festival online but couldn't figure out how to do so. So she changed the title of the film to Sorry Film Not Ready in the online entry form, hoping festival organizers would get the message. But when the two-week deadline came, Perlman received a notification that they had yet to receive a film entitled Sorry Film Not Ready and were extending the deadline. So Perlman completed a one-minute film under the title Sorry Film Not Ready and it was accepted by the Ottawa festival.

At the 1994 Ottawa International Animation Festival, Perlman's short My Favourite Things That I Love proved popular but confusing to the audience, and the jury awarded her a tongue-in-cheek "Best Bad Taste Award" for the film. The film then went on to receive a "Most Horrible Music Award" from the Annecy International Animated Film Festival.
