= List of programs broadcast by Nick Jr. (block) =

Logo used since July 5, 2023 (Note: The logo's wordmark has been in use since September 28, 2009. Additionally, there is a variant meant to be used for white backgrounds; the main variant has a white (for Nick) and blue (for Jr.) wordmark in conjunction with a fully orange splat.)

This is a list of television programs currently or formerly broadcast on Nickelodeon's morning block, Nick Jr.

== Current programming ==
- ^{1}Also aired on Nick Jr. on CBS/Nick on CBS

=== Original programming ===
Title	Premiere date	Source(s)
Tim Rex in Space	August 4, 2025	

=== Acquired programming ===
==== Co-productions ====
Title	Premiere date	Source(s)
Paw Patrol	August 12, 2013	(Note: Nickelodeon is named in the credits, but Nickelodeon's studios did not produce the show.)
Peppa Pig	November 15, 2013	
Rubble & Crew	February 3, 2023	
Mr. Crocodile	February 23, 2026	

== Upcoming programming ==
=== Original programming ===
Title	Premiere date	Source(s)
HexVets and Magic Pets	2026	

== Former programming ==
=== Original programming ===
Title	Premiere date	End date	Source(s)
Pinwheel	January 4, 1988	July 6, 1990	
Eureeka's Castle	August 27, 1989	January 29, 1999	
Allegra's Window	October 24, 1994	January 29, 1999	
Gullah Gullah Island	October 24, 1994	March 7, 2000	
Blue's Clues^{1}	September 8, 1996	May 22, 2008	
Binyah Binyah!	February 2, 1998	February 6, 1998	
Little Bill^{1}	November 28, 1999	December 22, 2006	
Dora the Explorer^{1}	August 14, 2000	August 9, 2019	
Oswald^{1}	August 20, 2001	May 24, 2005	
Whoopi's Littleburg	January 18, 2004	September 20, 2005	
Blue's Room	August 2, 2004	January 14, 2008	
The Backyardigans^{1}	October 11, 2004	April 29, 2013	
Go, Diego, Go!^{1}	September 6, 2005	February 15, 2013	
Holly Hobbie & Friends (specials)	February 10, 2006	September 7, 2007	
Wonder Pets!	March 3, 2006	May 6, 2011	
Ni Hao, Kai-Lan	February 7, 2008	March 4, 2011	
The Fresh Beat Band	August 24, 2009	June 8, 2012	
Team Umizoomi	January 25, 2010	July 15, 2022	
Bubble Guppies	January 24, 2011	October 27, 2023	
Wallykazam!	February 3, 2014	February 12, 2016	
Dora and Friends: Into the City!	August 18, 2014	February 5, 2016	
Blaze and the Monster Machines	October 13, 2014	December 1, 2025	
Mutt & Stuff	March 6, 2015	August 10, 2017	
Fresh Beat Band of Spies	June 29, 2015	July 2, 2015	
Shimmer and Shine	August 24, 2015	March 23, 2018	
Nella the Princess Knight	February 6, 2017	December 22, 2017	
Sunny Day	July 7, 2017	August 10, 2018	
Zoofari	February 5, 2018	February 15, 2018	
Butterbean's Café	November 12, 2018	August 1, 2019	
Blue's Clues & You!	November 11, 2019	September 11, 2023	
Santiago of the Seas	October 9, 2020	January 13, 2023	
Baby Shark's Big Show!	December 11, 2020	December 21, 2023	(Note: Co-produced by Nickelodeon Animation Studio and The Pinkfong Company. The Pinkfong Company owns the characters and other elements in the show while ViacomCBS retains half of the show's copyright.)
Face's Music Party	June 3, 2022	December 11, 2023	
The Tiny Chef Show	September 9, 2022	November 11, 2024	
Bossy Bear	March 6, 2023	January 18, 2024	
Super Duper Bunny League	April 19, 2025	June 4, 2025	

=== Acquired programming ===
Title	Premiere date	End date	Source(s)
Belle and Sebastian	January 4, 1988	September 1, 1989	
Maple Town	January 4, 1988	September 1, 1989	
Sharon, Lois & Bram's Elephant Show	January 4, 1988	October 21, 1994	
Today's Special	January 4, 1988	April 30, 1991	
The World of David the Gnome	January 4, 1988	June 30, 1995	
Adventures of the Little Koala	January 6, 1988	April 2, 1993	
Doctor Snuggles	April 4, 1988	March 31, 1990	
Fred Penner's Place	September 4, 1989	August 31, 1993	
The Adventures of the Little Prince	September 13, 1988	December 29, 1989	
Noozles	November 8, 1988	April 2, 1993	
Maya the Bee	January 1, 1990	December 31, 1992	
The Littl' Bits	May 1, 1991	April 30, 1995	
Nick Jr. Lunchbreak Theater; Nick Jr. Storytime: Grimm's Fairy Tale Classics	June 15, 1992	June 2, 1995	
Jim Henson's Muppet Babies	October 5, 1992	December 31, 1998	
Cappelli & Company	April 5, 1993	June 10, 1994	
Janosch's Dream World	December 5, 1993	June 10, 1994	
Papa Beaver's Storytime	March 2, 1994	October 3, 1997	
The Muppet Show	April 4, 1994	March 29, 1996	
Lassie	October 24, 1994	August 31, 1995	
The Busy World of Richard Scarry	July 3, 1995	April 28, 2000	
Rupert	September 11, 1995	November 20, 1998	
Little Bear^{1}	November 6, 1995	December 25, 2002	
The Adventures of Timmy the Tooth	November 6, 1995	May 17, 1996	
The Wubbulous World of Dr. Seuss	October 7, 1997	November 13, 1998	
The Little Twins	June 22, 1998	July 3, 1998	
You're on Nickelodeon, Charlie Brown	November 16, 1998	February 26, 1999	
Franklin (Canadian co-production) ^{1}	January 11, 1999	July 30, 2004	
Kipper^{1}	February 8, 1999	December 25, 2001	
Maisy	February 11, 1999	December 25, 2001	
Shining Time Station	June 5, 2000	August 11, 2000	
Maggie and the Ferocious Beast (Canadian co-production)	June 5, 2000	September 21, 2005	
Bob the Builder^{1}	January 13, 2001	September 22, 2004	
Max & Ruby	August 26, 2002	October 4, 2018	
Rubbadubbers	September 2, 2003	September 22, 2005	
LazyTown ^{1}	August 16, 2004	October 7, 2007	
Miss Spider's Sunny Patch Friends^{1}	September 7, 2004	December 29, 2006	
Wow! Wow! Wubbzy!	August 28, 2006	December 20, 2010	
Yo Gabba Gabba!	August 20, 2007	February 25, 2011	
Olivia	January 26, 2009	July 10, 2009	
Dino Dan	December 20, 2010		
Mike the Knight	February 3, 2012	December 21, 2012	
Franklin and Friends (Canadian co-production)	February 13, 2012	June 1, 2012	
Tickety Toc	September 10, 2012	September 20, 2012	
Peter Rabbit	December 14, 2012	December 12, 2014	
Lalaloopsy	March 29, 2013	December 6, 2013	
Julius Jr.	September 30, 2013	August 7, 2015	
Little Charmers	January 12, 2015	December 11, 2015	
Rusty Rivets	November 8, 2016	October 4, 2018	
Hey Duggee	December 23, 2016		
Top Wing	November 6, 2017	May 31, 2019	
Thomas & Friends	December 15, 2017	December 30, 2019	
Abby Hatcher	December 31, 2018	February 6, 2020	
Corn & Peg	February 22, 2019	May 31, 2019	
Ryan's Mystery Playdate	April 19, 2019	November 4, 2021	
Ricky Zoom (European co-production)	September 2, 2019	February 3, 2020	
The Adventures of Paddington	December 20, 2019	March 27, 2020	
Deer Squad	January 25, 2021	May 27, 2021	
Kiri & Lou	July 15, 2022	January 12, 2023	
Gabby's Dollhouse	June 5, 2023	June 26, 2024	
The Creature Cases	July 1, 2024	July 11, 2024	

=== Programming from Noggin ===
Title	Premiere date	End date	Source(s)
Oobi	April 2002 (shorts)	April 7, 2003	
Jack's Big Music Show	September 12, 2005	February 7, 2007	
The Upside Down Show	October 13, 2006		
Kinderwood	December 3, 2020		

=== Acquired programming from Noggin ===
Title	Premiere date	End date	Source(s)
Miffy and Friends	April 7, 2003		
Tweenies	April 7, 2003	September 25, 2003	
Pinky Dinky Doo	April 10, 2006		

=== Programming from Nickelodeon ===
Title	Premiere date	End date	Source(s)
Rugrats	October 24, 1994	May 2, 1997	

=== Acquired programming from Nickelodeon ===
Title	Premiere date	End date	Source(s)
44 Cats (European co-production)	May 25, 2019	January 5, 2020	
The Smurfs	July 10, 2023	August 3, 2023	

=== Programming from Paramount+ ===
Title	Premiere date	End date	Source(s)
Dora	August 5, 2024	November 28, 2025	

=== Short-form programming ===
Title	Premiere date	End date	Source(s)
Abby's Friends	1998	October 2004	
Amby & Dexter	June 2, 1997	October 2004	
Ants, Ants, Ants (one-off short)	September 1998	2001	
Ask the Cat	March 9, 1998	1998	
Babou & Baby	June 2007	2008	
The BeatBuds, Let's Jam!	June 7, 2021	July 16, 2021	
The Bedtime Business Song (one-off short)	1999	2001	
Belle, Bix and Barker	1992	June 10, 1994	
The Big Green Help	April 22, 2008	2010	
Blue's Clues Best Friends Marathon Interstitials	April 3, 2000	2002	
Blue's Room shorts	February 9, 2004	2005	
Bob the Builder shorts	2003	September 2004	
Chickiepoo and Fluff: Barnyard Detectives	January 2008	2010	
Count Along Time	December 5, 1993	June 10, 1994	
Countin' Carl	1996	1999	
Everyday Play	May 2007	2008	
Favorite Foods	November 2000	2002	
Flexy's Little Big Question	1996	1999	
Frank Cappelli on Nick Jr.	April 5, 1993	June 10, 1994	
The Fresh Beat Band Music Videos	April 3, 2009	2011	
Fresh Beat Blasts	September 2010	2011	
Gullah Gullah Island Jam Sessions	March 2000	2001	
Hocle and Stoty	1992	1996	
Joey's Lunch	1995	2003	
Jungle Boogie	1996	2003	
Just Ask!	2000	October 2004	
Just For Me Stories	2001	October 2004	
Linny the Guinea Pig	2003	2006	
Little Big Room	October 24, 1994	1997	
Loretta the Letter Lady	August 1993	1996	
Love to Play/Sing/Laugh	October 11, 2004	September 7, 2007	
The Mad Caps	September 1, 2003	2004	
Maggie and the Ferocious Beast shorts	1998	2004	
Max and his Alphabet Adventures	1993	October 2004	
Mighty Bug 5	October 11, 2004	2006	
Muppet Time	October 24, 1994	1998	
My World: Downward Doghouse	October 11, 2004	2006	
The Name Game (one-off short)	August 1995	1997	
Nanalan'	1999	2003	
Nick Jr. Hispanic Heritage Month	September 15, 2006	October 13, 2006	
Nick Jr. Play Along	September 15, 2003	February 2004	
Nick Jr. Presents	2000	October 2004	
Nick Jr. Presents Bill Cosby	1999	2002	
Nick Jr. Rocks	1991	1993	
Nick Jr. Show and Tell	September 1998	2002	
Nick Jr. Sings	August 1995	2003	
Nick Jr.'s I Can Do It!	2002	October 2004	
Nickellennium (excerpts)	2000	2002	
Oobi shorts	April 2002		
Picture Pages	January 4, 1988	1992	
Playful Parent	2001	2007	
A Pup Grows Up	2005	2007	
Reed's Sound Jars	1996	1999	
Sing with Us	September 10, 2007	2011	
Snappy Larry's Showtime	2001	2002	
Sparky N'Arfman (one-off short)	1999		
Sports Cartoons	January 4, 1988	April 2, 1993	
Thomas the Tank Engine and Friends	July 2000	2000	
Tricky Trousers	1991	June 10, 1994	
What Can You Imagine?	2001	2003	
What's the Buzz with Philomena Fly	1995	October 2004	
Winky Love	October 24, 1994	1999	
Wordville with Marc Weiner and Friends	February 1998	2000	

=== Mascots ===
Title	Premiere date	End date	Source(s)
Face	October 24, 1994	October 8, 2004	
Piper O'Possum	October 11, 2004	September 7, 2007	
