= Dinner for Two =

Dinner for Two may refer to:

- Dinner for Two (1947 film), Swedish comedy film
- Dinner for Two (1996 film), Canadian animated short film
- "Dinner for Two" (The Upper Hand), a 1990 television episode
- "Dinner for Two", a 2003 song by Deerhoof from Apple O'
