= She Was Poor but She Was Honest =

British anti-war anthem

"She Was Poor but She Was Honest", sometimes known as "(It's the Same) the Whole World Over" or (more rarely) by other names, is a traditional seriocomic song or monologue. It is Roud Folk Song Index number 9621.

== History ==
The consensus is that it originated in the late 19th century English music hall tradition. It was sung by British soldiers during World War I, and also by RAF airmen during World War II. It has crossed the Atlantic to North America. It has also become a British rugby song.

== Content ==
A wealthy older man seduces a young and pretty country girl. Out of shame, she flees to London, becomes a prostitute, and eventually drowns herself in the river; whereas he remains an accepted member of high society. The details vary, and the words have varying degrees of bawdiness. The man may be a rich man, a squire, a Member of Parliament, or an army officer. He may or may not get her pregnant. She may be a common or a high-class prostitute; but in Billy Bennett's recorded version, she sells bootlaces on the street instead; and in Derek Lamb's, matches. The refrain points the moral:

It's the same the whole world over,
It's the poor what gets the blame,
It's the rich what gets the pleasure,
Isn't it a blooming shame?

== Versions ==
The song has been recorded but few times. In 1930, English comedian Billy Bennett made a 10" single, Columbia DB 164, with the words credited to Bert Lee and R. P. Weston and the music to Lee. In 1962, Derek Lamb, best known as a British animation filmmaker and producer, included it on an album itself called She Was Poor but She Was Honest. It has also appeared in recorded compilations of rugby songs.

== Legacy ==
W. H. Auden included "Poor but Honest" in The Oxford Book of Light Verse (1938).

The Whole World Over is also the English title of a 1947 play by Konstantin Simonov, and of a 2007 novel by Julia Glass.

This song is completely different from "The Same the Whole World Over" by Irish singer-songwriter Gilbert O'Sullivan on his 2018 album Gilbert O'Sullivan.

Danish singer Per Dich published a version with similar lyrics in 1966 called "Kapitalismen".

Dutch singer Leen Jongewaard published a version in 1967 called "Het is de schuld van het kapitaal" (translated as "Capital Is to Blame").
