= George and Rosemary =

- Directed by: David Fine; Alison Snowden
- Produced by: Eunice Macaulay
- Narrated by: Cec Linder
- Music by: Patrick Godfrey
- Production company: National Film Board of Canada
- Release date: 1987
- Running time: 7 minutes
- Country: Canada
- Language: English

George and Rosemary is a 1987 animated short co-directed by Alison Snowden and David Fine, about two "golden agers" who prove that passion is not exclusively for the young.

== Storyline ==
George, an old dreamer, has a secret love for the woman directly next door to him. However, while he can sweep her off her feet in his imagination; actually doing it is a different matter. So he stays at his home as he works to build up the gumption to see her.

== Production ==
Produced by Eunice Macaulay for the National Film Board of Canada, the film was narrated by Cec Linder.

== Accolades ==
The film received the Genie Award for Best Short Film and was nominated for an Academy Award for Best Animated Short Film at the 60th Academy Awards. It was also included in the Animation Show of Shows.

== See also ==
- Bob's Birthday
- Bob and Margaret
