= The Only Game in Town (1979 film) =

- Directed by: Ron Mann; David Fine
- Written by: Ron Mann; David Fine
- Produced by: Ron Mann; David Fine
- Starring: Izzy Manheim; David Fine; Bob Lord; Joe Frost
- Edited by: Ron Mann; David Fine
- Distributed by: International Telefilm
- Release date: 1979
- Running time: 7 minutes
- Country: Canada

The Only Game in Town is a Canadian animated short film, directed by Ron Mann and David Fine and released in 1979. Made through claymation, the film centres on Michael, a young boy who is being taught how to play poker by his father and two of his father's friends.

Although first released in 1979, the film had only limited distribution until 1982, when it was named one of nine winners of the Canadian Independent Short Film Showcase, a competition for emerging filmmakers, whose prize included having the films blown up to 35 mm format for commercial exhibition, and distributed as the opening films at feature film screenings that summer. According to Mann, the film screened with the Cheech & Chong film Things Are Tough All Over.

The film received a Genie Award nomination for Best Theatrical Short Film at the 4th Genie Awards in 1983.
