= Special Delivery (1978 film) =

- Directed by: Eunice Macaulay; John Weldon
- Written by: Eunice Macaulay; John Weldon
- Produced by: Derek Lamb
- Narrated by: Sandy Sanderson; Jean Marchand (French version)
- Music by: Karl du Plessis
- Production company: National Film Board of Canada
- Release date: November 6, 1978
- Running time: 7 minutes
- Country: Canada
- Language: English
- Budget: $35,065

Special Delivery (French: Livraison spéciale) is a 1978 animated short film made at the National Film Board of Canada which won the Academy Award for Best Animated Short Film as well as first prize at Animafest Zagreb. It was directed by Eunice Macaulay and John Weldon. An English and a French-language version were released.

== Plot ==
After Ralph dismisses his wife's orders to clear the snow from the front walk before he went out for the day, he finds his regular mailman dead on his front stairs, having slipped on the ice and broken his neck. Fearing police investigations and potential wrongful death lawsuits from the letter carriers' union amongst other things, Ralph must go to great lengths to cover up the mailman's death while his wife comes to terms with her past.

== Production ==
The film had a budget of $35,065 (equivalent to $157,313 in 2025).

== Works cited ==
- Evans, Gary (1991). In the National Interest: A Chronicle of the National Film Board of Canada from 1949 to 1989. University of Toronto Press. ISBN 0802027849.
