= Ricky Sprocket: Showbiz Boy =

Canadian television series

- Also known as: Ricky Sprocket
- Genre: Comedy; Animated sitcom
- Created by: David Fine; Alison Snowden
- Written by: Russell Marcus; David Fine; Alison Snowden; Bill Motz; Bob Roth; Shane Simmons; Steven Sullivan; Alicia Sky Varinaitis
- Directed by: Josh Mepham; Alison Snowden; David Fine
- Starring: Jillian Michaels; Tabitha St. Germain; Ashleigh Ball; Jayne Eastwood; Jeff Lumby; Kathleen Barr; Dorla Bell; Andrea Libman; Scott McNeil; Ian James Corlett; Jamie Watson; Brian Drummond; Peter Kelamis; Richard Newman; French Tickner; Dave Ward; Cathy Weseluck; Dale Wilson; Chiara Zanni
- Opening theme: "Ricky Sprocket!"
- Composer: Hal Beckett
- Country of origin: Canada
- Original language: English
- No. of seasons: 2
- No. of episodes: 26

Production
- Executive producers: David Fine; Alison Snowden; Chris Bartleman; Tatiana Kober; Blair Peters
- Producer: Ashley Ramsay
- Running time: 30 minutes
- Production companies: Bejuba! Entertainment; SnowdenFine Animation; Studio B Productions

Original release
- Network: Teletoon (Canada); Nicktoons Network (United States)
- Release: September 8, 2007 – May 4, 2009

Ricky Sprocket: Showbiz Boy is a Canadian animated sitcom produced and owned by Studio B Productions (now as WildBrain) and aired on Teletoon. Its first airing was as a sneak peek on August 31, 2007, with regular airings in the country beginning on September 8, 2007. The final episode was aired on May 4, 2009. 26 episodes were produced over two seasons.

== Production ==
The series was created by a London native Alison Snowden and David Fine, who also created the prime-time animated series Bob and Margaret as well as the Oscar-winning short Bob's Birthday. They co-directed the series along with Josh Mepham.

The series was produced at Studio B Productions in Vancouver, BC and was a production of Studio B, Snowden Fine, and Bejuba Entertainment. There are 52 11-minute episodes which air as half hours with two segments in each show. It was produced using Flash animation, which was done partly at Studio B and partly in the Philippines at Top Draw Animation.

Writers on the series included Russell Marcus (who also served as an executive story editor), Louise Moon, Bill Motz, and Bob Roth, Brandon Sawyer, Shane Simmons, Ian Boothby, Roger Fredericks.

Voices were recorded in Vancouver and Toronto.

== Summary ==
Ricky Sprocket is the world's biggest child star in film. He works for Wishworks studio (a parody of DreamWorks) and for Mr. Louie Fischburger, his boss. Despite the fact that Ricky stars in some of his favorite movies, lives in a mansion, and sometimes performs brain surgeries for actor patients, otherwise he is a normal kid who doesn't let celebrity fame go to his head. He likes to hang out with his friends and shares a rivalry with spoiled female child star Kitten Kaboodle. Still, Ricky has chores and homework to do when he isn't battling animatronic props.

== Characters ==
- Ricky Sprocket (voiced by Jillian Michaels) – Ricky is the world's biggest child star in film. At age 10, he is best-known, adored, and has everything a kid could want, but he's a normal kid with normal-kid problems. He loves hanging with his pals as much as he loves making movies. One minute he's battling aliens on set, the next he's doing his homework or taking out the garbage.
- Bunny Sprocket (voiced by Jayne Eastwood) – Bunny is a down-to-earth, unsophisticated, no-nonsense mother. She is loving and devoted and only sees Ricky as a typical boy. She is more concerned with his homework and taking out the garbage than "showbiz shenanigans". She also used to be a trapeze artist in high school.
- Leonard Sprocket (voiced by Jeff Lumby) – Leonard is Ricky's goofy father, but he always means well. He's a dedicated father, but not very sophisticated. Despite his son's fame and fortune, he still works in a sausage factory and often imparts wisdom to his son with stories about sausage. Ricky's father is well-meaning, but not that bright; he can be buffoonish, which causes Ricky acute embarrassment. He loves his job at Wishworks Sausages.
- Ethel Sprocket (voiced by Kathleen Barr) – Ethel is Ricky's younger sister and as smart and scheming as Ricky is charming and fun. She has no interest in her brother's movie business and would rather get him into trouble, but Ricky has occasionally come to Ethel when he needs her.
- Benny Newford (voiced by Tabitha St. Germain) – Ricky's biggest fan and pal. Often doesn't understand what Morris is talking about, but then, few people do. Benny isn't the sharpest knife in the drawer, but he makes up for it with his enthusiasm and his sheer dedication to Ricky. He is also colorblind.
- Morris Moony (voiced by Ashleigh Ball) – Morris Moony is Ricky's brainy pal. He loves science and biology and excels in all academic subjects, but he is exceptionally bad in art, drama, and gym. However, he is a good rope holder and apparently good at video games. If there's a technical way of looking at anything, Morris will find it. Often refers to facts on his laptop, which he seems to have with him always.
- Jamal Pennycook (voiced by Dorla Bell) – Ricky's pal of African-Canadian heritage. Jamal has some demeanour, but he's still just a regular kid. He's a little more streetwise than Benny and Morris, but that's not saying much. Always ready for action, Jamal is the cool kid.
- Alice Applewood (voiced by Chiara Zanni) – Alice is sweet and clever, and often has good problem-solving ideas. She's kind of goofy and far more down-to-earth than Morris in her problem-solving approach. She is the least-seen of Ricky's friends.
- Kitten Kaboodle (voiced by Andrea Libman) – Kitten is another child star who is often cast in the same projects as Ricky. She is precocious, competitive, demanding, and terribly jealous of Ricky and his success. She drives everyone crazy, which may be due to the example her mother sets as her domineering agent. Her father is a milquetoast. Kitten is jealous of Ricky and loves to see him fail, but when they were lost on a deserted island she gave some indication that she may actually have feelings for him.
- Mr. Louie Fischburger (voiced by Scott McNeil) – Ricky’s boss. Mr. Fischburger is the head of Wishworks Studios (a parody of DreamWorks), where Ricky works. He's a small man with a big voice. He's an old time Hollywood boss and movies are his life. He treats Ricky like his own son. Well, better than his own son: he fired his own son. Besides, Ricky pays the bills.
- Wolf Wolinski (voiced by Jamie Watson) – Wolf is Ricky's regular director at Wishworks. He is driven and passionate and demanded the best from Ricky, but he also has a short fuse, so dealing with Ricky and Kitten is a trial for him. He can come across as obsessive and manic, like the stereotypical genius.
- Vanessa Stimlock (voiced by Tabitha St. Germain) – Showbiz Buzz Entertainment reporter at large. If there's a media scrum, she's leading it. Vanessa reports on all things showbiz, but seems to be especially assigned to cover Ricky Sprocket.

== Episodes ==
=== Season 1 (2007) ===
| No. | Title | Original release date |
|---|---|---|
| 1 | "The Screen Kiss" "The Boy King" | September 8, 2007 |
Ricky is shocked when he learns he must deal with his first on-screen kiss; Ricky and his family travel to a Polynesian island so he can research a new role, The Boy King.
| 2 | "Great Bowls of Ricky" "Burptacular" | September 9, 2007 |
Ricky learns that a cereal is launching with his face on the box; Ricky tries to learn the art of belching.
| 3 | "We Are Not Amused" "Being Leonard" | September 15, 2007 |
Ricky opens an amusement park; Leonard brings Ricky to work with him.
| 4 | "Oh Hap-Pee Day" "Ricky for Sale" | September 16, 2007 |
After Ricky's sister spills her drink on him at an awards show, the press believes that Ricky wet his pants on stage; Ricky's friends urge him to sell his unwanted knickknacks online.
| 5 | "Perfect Pitch" "In the Drink" | November 3, 2007 |
Ricky learns that he cannot sing; Ricky's inability to swim jeopardizes the movie that he is shooting.
| 6 | "Ethel's New Friend" "Vicky Sprocket" | September 22, 2007 |
Ricky's parents want him to help find Ethel some friends; Ricky disguises himself as a girl to get a big role.
| 7 | "Double Crossed" "Monkey See, Monkey Do" | September 23, 2007 |
The Studio Boss insists that Ricky has a stunt double for his upcoming movie; Ricky co-stars with Chico the talking monkey.
| 8 | "Runaway Ethel" "Freezer Burn" | September 29, 2007 |
Ethel drives Ricky's motor home through the set and onto the freeway; Ricky and his friends hear a rumor about Fischburger's cryogenically-frozen pet bunny.
| 9 | "Roy vs. Roy" "Dueling Birthdays" | November 4, 2007 |
After being cast in a movie with Ricky, Roy is replaced when he cannot follow directions; Ricky must work with his friends to attend birthday parties thrown by his parents and Mr. Fischburger.
| 10 | "The Lie Detector" "Leonard's Groove" | November 10, 2007 |
Ricky tries out a lie detector on his family and friends; Ethel and Ricky discover that Leonard was in an '80s glam band.
| 11 | "The Big Sleepover" "I Want to Direct!" | November 11, 2007 |
Ricky invites his friends to the set of his new movie; Ricky tries to write and direct his own movie.
| 12 | "The Real Sprocket" "A Book for Bedtime" | November 18, 2007 |
Ricky visits his cousin Leonard's farm as research for an upcoming movie; Kitten tries to sabotage Ricky by sending him a book that he is unable to stop reading.

=== Season 2 (2008–09) ===
| No. | Title | Original release date |
|---|---|---|
| 13 | "A Boy and his Bodyguard" "Ricky Who?" | September 1, 2008 |
"A Boy and his Bodyguard": Mr. Fischburger hires a bodyguard to protect Ricky. "Ricky Who?": Ricky finds a town where no one knows his name.
| 14 | "Space Family Sprocket Part 1+2" | September 8, 2008 |
"Space Family Sprocket": Ricky's family gets the opportunity to live in space.
| 15 | "The Survivors" "Ricky is History" | September 15, 2008 |
"The Survivors": Ricky and Kitten get lost on a remote island. "Ricky is History": Ricky has a school history project about show business.
| 16 | "The Highest Bidder" "Write for the Part" | October 6, 2008 |
"The Highest Bidder": Larry Knish bribes Ricky for a contract. "Write for the Part": Rick's autobiography is full of lies he must correct.
| 17 | "Where Wolf" "Ricky Spook-it" | February 2, 2009 |
"Where Wolf": Ricky stars in a werewolf movie and borrows the costume to go out with his friends on Halloween. "Ricky Spook-it": Ricky and Kitten are shooting a vampire movie on location. Ricky thinks that the actor who plays Dracula is a real live vampire.
| 18 | "Ethelebrity" "Ricky Rolls Over" | February 9, 2009 |
"Ethelebrity": Ethel becomes Hollywood's newest darling. "Ricky Rolls Over": Ricky gets hypnotized which causes him to act like a dog on cue.
| 19 | "Fan Club" "Face Lift" | February 16, 2009 |
"Fan Club": Ricky's fan club is overloaded, so the mail is redirected straight to Ricky. He insists on answering every letter, but when it starts to get in the way of studio business, Fischburger insists he hires help. "Face Lift": Kitten sees face lift as a fantastic opportunity. In disguise, she manages to get the job and sabotage Ricky's fanbase.
| 20 | "Ricky Inc." "Relative Discomfort" | March 2, 2009 |
"Ricky Inc": Ricky's summer off is filled with odd jobs for his neighbors. "Relative Discomfort": Ricky and Kitten compete on a game show with their families.
| 21 | "Grounded" "Bush League" | March 9, 2009 |
"Grounded": Ricky must prove his innocence while grounded. "Bush League": Benny and Ricky swap roles in the school play.
| 22 | "The Perfect Family" "Moby Rick" | March 16, 2009 |
"The Perfect Family": Ricky's fake family is interviewed on The Family Famous Channel. "Moby Rick": Ricky tries to prove that a sea monster is real.
| 23 | "Who's Your Daddy?" "Test Audience" | April 6, 2009 |
"Who's Your Daddy?": Leonard emberrasses Ricky in front of an action star. "Test Audience": Ricky and Kitten sabotage each other's films.
| 24 | "Ricky the Ringleader" "Mind Games" | April 13, 2009 |
"Ricky the Ringleader": Ricky helps save Chico the monkey's circus. "Mind Games": Ricky stars in a new video game, which Kitten sabotages.
| 25 | "Ho-Ho Hollywood" | February 19, 2009 |
"Ho-Ho Hollywood Part 1+2": When Ricky and the crew find out they have to work through Christmas, they aren't merry, especially Ricky's co-star, who claims that he is the real Santa and can't possibly work over Christmas. Ricky humors the man and encourages him to go back to the North Pole, which he promptly does. Fischburger freaks out: the film and the entire studio could go down the drain unless Ricky can get Santa back.
| 26 | "Head Over Heels" "When Life Gives You Lemonade" | May 4, 2009 |
"Head Over Heels": Ricky falls in love with an Austrian actress. "When Life Gives You Lemonade": Ricky tries to help his friend's lemonade stand.

== Telecast and home media ==
Ricky Sprocket: Showbiz Boy aired on Teletoon in Canada, Nickelodeon in the United Kingdom and Nicktoons in the U.S. Its first airing was as a sneak peek on August 31, 2007, with regular airings in the country beginning on September 8, 2007. The final episode was aired on May 4, 2009 with repeats until the early 2010s.

The first season was released on DVD in the U.S. with eight episodes. A Canadian DVD was released in March 2009.

== See also ==
Bob & Margaret
