= Animal Behaviour (film) =

- Film poster
- Directed by: Alison Snowden; David Fine
- Written by: Alison Snowden; David Fine
- Produced by: Michael Fukushima
- Starring: Ryan Beil; Taz VanRassel; Leah Juel; Andrea Libman; James Kirk; Alison Snowden
- Music by: Judith Gruber-Stitzer
- Production company: National Film Board of Canada
- Release date: June 11, 2018 (Annecy)
- Running time: 14 minutes
- Country: Canada
- Language: English

Animal Behaviour (also released in French as Zoothérapie) is a Canadian animated short film directed by Alison Snowden and David Fine, which was released in 2018. The duo's first animated theatrical short since their 1993 Oscar-winning film Bob's Birthday, the film centres on a group of animals who meet weekly for a group psychotherapy session in the offices of psychiatrist Dr. Clement.

The film's voice cast includes Ryan Beil as Dr. Clement the dog, Taz VanRassel as Victor the ape, Leah Juel as Lorraine the leech, Andrea Libman as Cheryl the mantis, Toby Berner as Todd the pig, James Kirk as Jeffrey the bird, and Alison Snowden as Linda the cat.

== Release ==
The film premiered in June 2018 at the Annecy International Animated Film Festival. The film was dedicated to the medical team at the Vancouver General Hospital, who saved Snowden's life in 2017 when she was diagnosed with acute interstitial pneumonitis during the making of the film.

== Awards and honors ==
The film was nominated for the Academy Award for Best Animated Short Film at the 91st Academy Awards, but lost to the Pixar short Bao. In March 2019, it won the Canadian Screen Award for Best Animated Short Film at the 7th Canadian Screen Awards.

== See also ==
- HouseBroken: American adult animated sitcom, premiering in 2021, with a similar premise of an animal therapy group.
