= Sports Cartoons =

- Genre: Sports
- Created by: Derek Lamb; Janet Perlman
- Countries of origin: United States; Canada
- No. of seasons: 1
- No. of episodes: 45

Production
- Running time: 2 minutes
- Production company: Lamb-Perlman Productions

Original release
- Network: Nickelodeon
- Release: 1985 – 1985

Sports Cartoons is an American animated series, produced by Derek Lamb and Janet Perlman's Lamb-Perlman Productions in 1985. The series featured various sports being played by anthropomorphic animals, including cats, dogs, pigs, and hippopotami. Some of these sports included ice hockey, shot put, soccer, American football, and table tennis.

== Screening ==
The episodes were short in length, ranging from 40 seconds to two minutes. Roughly 45 episodes were created, many of which were played during commercial breaks on Nickelodeon in the late 1980s and early to mid-1990s. Visually speaking, Sports Cartoons bear resemblance to other series animated in the National Film Board of Canada style. The series was issued on video cassette by Family Home Entertainment.

== Characters ==
Sports Cartoons typically featured several of the same four characters in each episode. However, in episodes involving teams, the team was usually made up of numerous identical versions of the same character (for example, a football team of cats, or a hockey team of hippopotami).

=== Hippopotamus ===
The hippopotamus is calm and usually emerges as the victor. The hippopotamus is the most frequent opponent of the cat. The hippo remains peaceful and collected, unless a smaller helpless creature (such as a butterfly or a flower) is threatened, in which case he becomes highly protective.

=== Cat ===
The cat is the antagonist who, for the most part, does not play fair. He frequently faces off against the hippopotamus, wherein he tries to interrupt, distract, or otherwise throw off the hippopotamus' efforts. Usually this backfires, as the hippopotamus always wins. Another variation of the cat is the Big Cat, which is a larger, burlier rendition of the small cat.

=== Pig ===
The pig appears less frequently, and along with the hippopotamus, competes against the cat (or cats). Like the hippopotamus, the pig always comes out on top, though usually through dumb luck.

=== Dog ===
The dog is rarely seen, and usually portrays the referee/judge.
