= Andrew MacLachlan =

Scottish actor and cricketer (1941–2018)

Personal information
- Full name: Andrew MacLachlan
- Born: 27 February 1941; Trearddur, Anglesey, Wales
- Died: 17 December 2018 (aged 77)
- Batting: Right-handed
- Bowling: Right-arm medium

Domestic team information
- Years: Team
- 1962: Oxford University

Career statistics
Competition	First-class
Matches	5
Runs scored	99
Batting average	14.14
100s/50s	–/–
Top score	28
Balls bowled	312
Wickets	3
Bowling average	79.66
5 wickets in innings	–
10 wickets in match	–
Best bowling	1/49
Catches/stumpings	1/–
- Source: Cricinfo, 9 June 2020

Andrew MacLachlan (27 February 1941 – 17 December 2018) was a Scottish first-class cricketer and actor who was active on British television and in films 1979 to 2006.

== Early life and cricket ==
The son of the Scotsman Geoffrey MacLachlan and his wife, Violet (née Hicks), he was born at Trearddur on Anglesey where his father was stationed while on military service during the Second World War. His parents divorced shortly after the war and MacLachlan lived with his mother in a converted Martello tower at Malahide in Ireland. He was educated in England, where he attended St Edward's School, Oxford. He remained in Oxford after completing his education at St Edward's, matriculating at St Edmund Hall, Oxford. While studying at St Edmund Hall, MacLachlan played first-class cricket for Oxford University in 1962, making five appearances. An all-rounder, he scored 99 runs in his five matches, with a high score of 28, while with the ball he took 3 wickets.

After graduating from Oxford, MacLachlan became an English teacher in a prep school. In his spare time he would play the guitar and sing in folk and cabaret clubs. He married Georgina Morton in 1966, with the couple having met while doing temporary work at Christmas in Harrods. Having left the teaching profession, he found an office job with the Heating and Ventilation Contractors Association to support his family, which now included three daughters.

== Acting career ==
Aged 38, MacLachlan decided to try his hand as an actor and contacted his Oxford University friend Terry Jones who gave him his first screen role in 1979 when he appeared as a Roman centurion in the Life of Brian. He also appeared in the films Time Bandits, A Fish Called Wanda, Danny, the Champion of the World, Bob's Birthday (as a voice-over), Who Dares Wins, and Trauma. He has appeared in TV serials including Twelfth Night, Play for Today, The Ruth Rendell Mysteries, Foyle's War, and Pickles: The Dog Who Won the World Cup in 2006, which was his last film appearance.

MacLachlan died on 17 December 2018, aged 77. He was survived by his wife and their three daughters, in addition to four grandchildren.

== Filmography ==
Year	Title	Role	Notes
1979	Monty Python's Life of Brian	Another Official Stoners Helper / Giggling Guard	
1981	Time Bandits	Fireman	
1982	Who Dares Wins	Immigration Officer	
1982	Witness for the Prosecution	Jury Foreman	
1983	Monty Python's The Meaning of Life	Groom / Wycliff / Victim No. 1 / Guest No. 3	
1987	Personal Services	Mr. McClellan	
1988	A Fish Called Wanda	Eebedee	
1988	The Adventures of Baron Munchausen	Colonel	
1988	Managing Problem People. Behavioral skills for leaders		
1989	Erik the Viking	Ornulf / Chamberlain / Dog Soldier	
2004	Trauma	Grief Stricken Man	
