= Why Me? (1978 film) =

- Directed by: Janet Perlman
- Produced by: Janet Perlman
- Starring: Marshall Efron; Richard Gilbert
- Production company: National Film Board of Canada
- Release date: September 11, 1978
- Running time: 10 minutes
- Country: Canada

Why Me? is a 1978 animated short film by Janet Perlman and co-directed by Derek Lamb.

== Summary ==
Nebbish average guy Nesbit Spoon's (Marshall Efron) various reactions (denial, anger, grief) to death after he is told by his doctor (Richard Gilbert) that he only his five minutes to live.

== See also ==
- Life after death
- Horoscope
- Cryogenics
