= Paradise (1984 film) =

- Directed by: Ishu Patel
- Written by: Ishu Patel; Eunice Macaulay
- Produced by: Ishu Patel
- Cinematography: Pierre Landry
- Music by: Gheorghe Zamfir
- Animation by: Ishu Patel; George Ungar
- Production company: National Film Board of Canada
- Release date: 1984
- Running time: 14 minutes
- Country: Canada

Paradise is a Canadian animated short film, directed by Ishu Patel and released in 1984.

== Summary ==
Using a variety of hand-drawn animation techniques, including cut-out animation, back-lit plasticine, sand and painted glass, the film tells the story of a blackbird who witnesses a brightly coloured bird living in the crystal palace of an emperor; envious of the other bird's apparent opulence, he strives to attain the same lifestyle for himself only to discover that it entails spending most of his time living in a gilded cage.

== Accolades ==
The film was an Academy Award nominee for Best Animated Short Film at the 57th Academy Awards in 1985, and a Genie Award nominee for Best Animated Short Film at the 7th Genie Awards in 1986. It was also the winner of the Silver Bear for Best Short Film at the 1985 Berlin Film Festival, and of a jury prize at the Annecy International Animation Film Festival.
