= Vittorio Guerrieri =

Italian voice actor

- Born: 23 December 1958 (age 67); Rome, Italy
- Occupations: Actor; voice actor; dubbing director
- Years active: 1968–present
- Spouse: Roberta Greganti

Vittorio Guerrieri (born 23 December 1958) is an Italian actor and voice actor.

== Biography ==
Born in Rome, Guerrieri made his acting debut at the age of nine on the television show Lazarillo, as well as performing in Ettore Scola's 1977 film A Special Day. As a voice actor, Guerrieri serves as the official Italian voice of Ben Stiller, as well as dubbing John Corbett, Steve Carell, Owen Wilson, Charles Martin Smith, Steve Zahn and Joseph Fiennes. He also dubbed Matthew Fox in Lost as well as Jason Bateman in Arrested Development.

In Guerrieri's animated roles, he voiced Squit in the Italian dub of Animaniacs as well as Freakazoid in the Italian dub of the series of the same name. He has also performed Italian voice dubbing roles in anime productions.

=== Personal life ===
Guerrieri is married to voice actress Roberta Greganti.

== Filmography ==
=== Cinema ===
- A Special Day (1977) - Umberto Taberi
- The Legend of the Titanic (1999) - Don Juan (voice)

=== Television ===
- Lazarillo (1968) - Lazarillo
- I racconti di Padre Brown - TV series (1971) - The greedy boy
- A torto e a ragione - TV miniseries (1978) - Renzetti
- Winx Club - animated series (2003-2019) - Prof. Palladium (voice, seasons 1-4), Electro (voice, season 6+)

== Dubbing roles ==
=== Animation ===
- Nuke, Keyn, Fritz, and Shiniki in Grendizer
- Tod in The Fox and the Hound
- Sting, Race Banyon, Dr. Velimirovic, Rainier Wolfcastle (third voice), Artie Ziff (some episodes) and Mark Cuban in The Simpsons
- Dexter Douglas and Freakazoid in Freakazoid!
- Squit and Freakazoid in Animaniacs
- Shigeru Aoba in Neon Genesis Evangelion: Death & Rebirth (2nd dub), Neon Genesis Evangelion: The End of Evangelion (2nd dub), Evangelion: 1.0 You Are (Not) Alone, Evangelion: 3.0 You Can (Not) Redo, Evangelion: 3.0+1.0 Thrice Upon a Time
- Pongo in 101 Dalmatians: The Series
- Aikuro Mikisugi in Kill La Kill
- Bernard in Megamind
- Number 6 in 9
- Hank in A Scanner Darkly
- Dr. Benton Quest in Tom and Jerry: Spy Quest
- Stu Hopps in Zootopia
- Frank Heffley in Diary of a Wimpy Kid: Rodrick Rules (2022 film), Diary of a Wimpy Kid Christmas: Cabin Fever

=== Live action ===
- Andy Stitzer in The 40-Year-Old Virgin
- Reuben Feffer in Along Came Polly
- Michael Bluth in Arrested Development
- Miika, the mouse in A Boy Called Christmas
- Wesley Wyndam-Pryce in Buffy the Vampire Slayer
- Frank Heffley in Diary of a Wimpy Kid, Diary of a Wimpy Kid: Rodrick Rules, Diary of a Wimpy Kid: Dog Days
- Alex Rose in Duplex
- Miles Taylor in Elvis Has Left the Building
- Roger Greenberg in Greenberg
- Eddie Cantrow in The Heartbreak Kid
- Burt Wonderstone in The Incredible Burt Wonderstone
- Jack Shephard in Lost
- John Grogan in Marley & Me
- Greg Focker in Meet the Parents, Meet the Fockers, Little Fockers
- Matthew Meyerowitz in The Meyerowitz Stories
- Ian Miller in My Big Fat Greek Wedding, My Big Fat Greek Wedding 2
- Larry Daley in Night at the Museum, Night at the Museum: Battle of the Smithsonian, Night at the Museum: Secret of the Tomb
- Michael Schott in The Office (USA)
- Jerry Stahl in Permanent Midnight
- Dan Parker in Raising Helen
- Chas Tenenbaum in The Royal Tenenbaums
- Walter Mitty in The Secret Life of Walter Mitty
- David Starsky in Starsky & Hutch
- Guitar Center Guy in Tenacious D in The Pick of Destiny
- Josh Kovaks in Tower Heist
- Tugg Speedman in Tropic Thunder
- Derek Zoolander in Zoolander, Zoolander 2
