= Eunice Macaulay =

- Born: Eunice Bagley; July 5, 1923; St Helens, Merseyside, England, United Kingdom
- Died: July 8, 2013 (aged 90); Hawkesbury, Ontario
- Occupation: Animator

Eunice Macaulay (nee Eunice Bagley) (July 5, 1923 – July 8, 2013) was a British-born Academy Award–winning animator whose credits range from animation to writing, directing, and producing.

== Biography ==
Eunice Bagley was born in St Helens in Lancashire, England. Her first job was as a trainee chemist at Pilkington Brothers. During World War II, she served in the Women's Royal Naval Service as a radio mechanic. In the 1950s, she became a graphic artist and greeting card designer. She shifted into animation when a Christmas card she had designed got her a job with Gaumont British Animation (later part of the Rank Organisation) in 1948. Starting out as a tracer, she went on to hold nearly every position in animation, including background artist, ink and paint supervisor, rendering supervisor, writer, animator, producer, and director.

In the early 1960s, Macaulay and her filmmaker husband, Jim Macaulay emigrated to the United States. She worked as a freelancer in both the United States and Canada. In 1969, she took a job with Potterton Productions, and in 1973 she was hired full-time by the National Film Board of Canada (NFB).

She worked on 25 films altogether, including 18 as artist or animator, 10 as producer, 5 as writer, and 1 as director. She won many awards, including the Academy Award for Best Animated Short Film for the 1978 film Special Delivery, which she cowrote and directed with John Weldon. It also took first prize at Animafest Zagreb. Funded by the NFB, it is a dryly humorous account of what happened after a mailman's unexpected death. It was released in both English and in a French-language version.

She served as the producer on the animated short George and Rosemary (1987), which was nominated for an Oscar, and on Just for Kids (1983), a series of adaptations of children's stories by Canadian writers. Other credits include writer on Ishu Patel's Paradise, which was nominated for an Oscar in 1985, and writer/producer on Robert Doucet's Dreams of a Land (1987), about Samuel de Champlain.

She retired from the NFB in 1990 and died in Hawkesbury, Ontario.

== Personal life ==
She was married to Jim Macaulay. She had two daughters, Lesley and Maggi.

== Films as director or writer ==
as Director

- Special Delivery (1978)

as Writer

- The Long Enchantment (1993)
- Dreams of a Land (1987)
- Summer Legend (1986)
- Paradise (1984)
- Special Delivery (1978)

== Films in animation roles ==
- The Boy and the Snow Goose (1984)
- Real Inside (1984)
- The Old Lady's Camping Trip (1983)
- The Trout That Stole the Rainbow (1982)
- Canada Vignettes: Log Driver's Waltz (1981)
- The Tender Tale of Cinderella Penguin (1981)
- The Sweater (1980)
- Every Child (1979)
- What the Hell's Going on Up There? (1979)
- Special Delivery (1978)
- Deep Threat (1977)
- No Apple for Johnny (1977)
- Spinnolio (1977)
- A Token Gesture (1975)
- The Energy Carol (1975)
- Who Are We? (1974)
- Ten: The Magic Number (1973)
- The Selfish Giant (1971)
