= Derek Lamb =

English animation producer and professor (1936–2005)

- Born: Derek Reginald Steven Lamb; June 20, 1936 Bromley, Kent, England, UK
- Died: November 5, 2005 (aged 69) Poulsbo, Washington, USA

Derek Reginald Lamb (20 June 1936 – 5 November 2005) was a British animation filmmaker and producer. While serving as executive producer of the National Film Board of Canada's English Animation Studio from 1976 to 1982, he produced the Oscar-winner Special Delivery, directed by John Weldon and Eunice Macaulay, and produced and scripted Eugene Fedorenko's Every Child. He also created numerous animated sketches for Sesame Street, sometimes in collaboration with John Canemaker.

In 1983, he and a former wife, animator Janet Perlman, formed an independent production company. Among their productions was the Sports Cartoons series, which aired on Nickelodeon in the United States. Lamb and Fedorenko collaborated on the first animation sequences for an IMAX film, Skyward, first presented at Expo '85 in Tsukuba, Ibaraki, Japan.

With Fedorenko and Perlman, Lamb created the animated title sequence of the PBS series Mystery! based on the art of Edward Gorey, and a series of network ID's for YTV in 1991.

Lamb was also a musician. In 1962, he released an album of songs on Folkways Records titled She Was Poor But She Was Honest after its title track, which included songs drawn from London music halls and pubs.

Two years before his death, Lamb appeared, as himself, in the 2004 Oscar-winning animated documentary short film Ryan, directed by Canadian-based animation filmmaker Chris Landreth.

From his first marriage, he had two sons: Richard Steven Lamb (born in London on 27 September 1963) and Thomas Derek Lamb (born in Cambridge on 3 March 1966). He died at the age of 69 from cancer, at a friend's home in Poulsbo, Washington on 5 November 2005.
