= Dinner for Two (1996 film) =

- Directed by: Janet Perlman
- Written by: Janet Perlman
- Produced by: Barrie McLean
- Music by: Judith Gruber-Stitzer
- Production companies: National Film Board of Canada; UNICEF
- Release date: 1996
- Running time: 7 minutes
- Country: Canada
- Language: titles in English

Dinner for Two is a Canadian animated short film, directed by Janet Perlman and released in 1996. The film centres on two chameleons who must learn to cooperate when their attempts to capture the same insect as food lead them into a life-threatening situation.

The film was a Genie Award nominee for Best Animated Short Film at the 18th Genie Awards in 1997.

Perlman also later published the story as an illustrated children's book, under the title The Delicious Bug.
