= In and Out (1989 film) =

- Directed by: Alison Snowden; David Fine
- Written by: David Fine; Alison Snowden
- Release date: 1989
- Running time: 9 minutes
- Country: Canada
- Language: English

In and Out is a Canadian animated short film, directed by Alison Snowden and David Fine and released in 1989.

== Summary ==
The film tells the story of a man's life from birth to old age.

== Accolades ==
The film received a Genie Award nomination for Best Animated Short Film at the 11th Genie Awards in 1990.
