= David Fine (filmmaker) =

Canadian filmmaker

David Fine (born September 13, 1960) is a Canadian filmmaker, who works in animated film alongside his British wife Alison Snowden. The couple are best known as the creators of the Nelvana animated television series Bob and Margaret, and as the directors of several animated short films which have won or been nominated for Genie Awards and Academy Awards.

Fine originally worked in film alongside documentarian Ron Mann, receiving his first Genie Award nomination when The Only Game in Town was shortlisted for Best Theatrical Short Film at the 4th Genie Awards in 1983. He then spent time studying at the National Film and Television School in England, where he met and married Snowden. Fine assisted Snowden on her 1985 short film Second Class Mail. They then worked together on George and Rosemary, which was an Academy Award nominee for Best Animated Short Film at the 60th Academy Awards and won the Genie Award for Best Theatrical Short Film at the 9th Genie Awards.

Their 1989 film In and Out was a nominee for the Genie Award for Best Theatrical Short Film at the 11th Genie Awards.

In 1994 they wrote the screenplay for J. Falconer's animated short film Deadly Deposits, and released their own animated short film Bob's Birthday. The film won the Academy Award for Best Animated Short Film at the 67th Academy Awards, was a Genie Award nominee for Best Theatrical Short Film at the 15th Genie Awards, and formed the basis for the television series Bob and Margaret.

After production of Bob and Margaret ended in 2001, Snowden and Fine created and worked on the animated television series Ricky Sprocket: Showbiz Boy and Shaun the Sheep. In 2018 they released Animal Behaviour, their first theatrical short film since Bob's Birthday, which received another Academy Award nomination for Best Animated Short Film at the 91st Academy Awards.

The couple's daughter Lily Snowden-Fine is a former child actress who was the original voice of Peppa Pig, and currently works as an artist and illustrator.

== Filmography ==
=== Short films ===
Year	Name	Role	Notes
1979	The Only Game in Town	Director, Screenwriter, Animator, Producer	Short
1985	Second Class Mail	Assistant animator, sound	Short
1987	People and Science: A Test of Time	Director, screenwriter	Short
1987	George and Rosemary	Director, story, associate producer, animator, sound, production designer	Short
1988	The Wanderer	Editor	Short
1989	In and Out	Director, screenwriter	Short
1991	Pink Komkommer	Animator	Short
1991	The Boss	Director, animator, designer	Short
1994	Bob's Birthday	Director, screenwriter, producer, animator	Short
1994	Deadly Deposits	Screenwriter	Short
2013	Yellow Sticky Notes: Canadian Anijam	Animator	Documentary short
2018	Animal Behaviour	Director, screenwriter, animator	

=== Television ===
Year	Name	Role	Notes
1998–2001	Bob and Margaret	Сreator, screenwriter, executive producer, voice director	TV series
2007–2009	Ricky Sprocket: Showbiz Boy	Co-creator, story, screenwriter	TV series
2007–present	Shaun the Sheep	Supervising director, executive producer, developer, series deviser, supervising story editor	TV series
