= Alison Snowden =

British animator, voice actress, producer and screenwriter

- Born: 4 April 1958 (age 68); Arnold, Nottinghamshire, England
- Citizenship: United Kingdom
- Occupations: Animator; voice actress; producer; director; screenwriter
- Spouse: David Fine
- Children: 1–who is Lily Snowden-Fine

Alison Snowden (born 4 April 1958) is a British animator, voice actress, director, producer, and screenwriter best known for Bob and Margaret alongside her Oscar-winning short Bob's Birthday which was also co-directed by her husband David Fine. Bob's Birthday serves as the pilot for Bob and Margaret

== Life and work ==
Born in Arnold, Nottinghamshire, Snowden studied at the Mansfield Art College, Lanchester Polytechnic (now Coventry University) and subsequently the National Film and Television School where she met and collaborated with her future husband David Fine. Snowden's short Second Class Mail was nominated for the Academy Award for Best Animated Short Film at the 58th Academy Awards.

At the 67th Academy Awards, Snowden and Fine's short Bob's Birthday received the Oscar.

Snowden and Fine's NFB films Bob's Birthday and George and Rosemary are included in the Animation Show of Shows.

Snowden, along with Fine, both created and produced Bob's Birthday and Bob and Margaret; Snowden has written three episodes for the animated TV show Peppa Pig, those being "Best Friend" and "Mister Skinnylegs" for Series One and "Polly's Holiday" for Series Two. Snowden and Fine also developed Shaun the Sheep, another animated series, for Aardman Animations, and created the character of Timmy.

=== Family ===
Snowden's daughter Lily Snowden-Fine is also a former voice actress with Astley Baker Davies, where she is best known for voicing Peppa Pig in the show of the same name, and has also appeared in Barbie: The Princess & the Popstar and the TV series Bob and Margaret. She currently works as an artist and illustrator.

== Filmography ==
Most of the following were done with Snowden's husband David Fine.

=== Screenwriter ===
- 1987: People and Science: A Test of Time
- 1989: In and Out
- 1993: Deadly Deposits
- 1993: Bob's Birthday
- 1998-2001: Bob and Margaret
- 2004-2006: Peppa Pig
- 2007: Shaun the Sheep
- 2007: Ricky Sprocket: Showbiz Boy
- 2018: Animal Behaviour

=== Director ===
- 1985: Second Class Mail
- 1987: People and Science: A Test of Time
- 1987: George and Rosemary
- 1989: In and Out
- 1993: Bob's Birthday
- 2018: Animal Behaviour

=== Voice acting ===
- 1993: Bob's Birthday – Margaret Fish
- 1998: Bob and Margaret – Margaret Fish, Additional Voices
- 1998: Captain Star – Jelloide (one episode)
- 2004: Peppa Pig – Auntie Pig (Series 1-2) / Polly The Parrot
- 2007: Ricky Sprocket: Showbiz Boy – Additional voices
- 2018: Animal Behaviour - Linda

=== Producer ===
- 1985: Second Class Mail
- 1993: Bob's Birthday

== Accolades ==
- 1986: Academy Award nomination for Second Class Mail
- 1988: Genie Award for Best Theatrical Short Film win for George and Rosemary
- 1995: Academy Award win for Bob's Birthday (with David Fine)
- 2019: Academy Award nomination for Animal Behaviour (with David Fine)
