= Bob and Margaret =

Adult animated TV series (1998–2001)

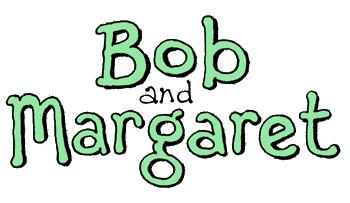
- Genre: Adult animation Romance; Animated sitcom
- Created by: David Fine; Alison Snowden
- Based on: Bob's Birthday by: David Fine; and Alison Snowden
- Starring: Andy Hamilton (S1–2); Brian George (S3–4); Alison Snowden
- Composer: Patrick Godfrey
- Countries of origin: Canada; United Kingdom (S1–2); Philippines (S3-4)
- No. of seasons: 4
- No. of episodes: 52

Production
- Executive producers: David Fine; Alison Snowden; Michael Hirsh; Patrick Loubert; Clive A. Smith; Frank Saperstein (S3–4); Mimbi L. Eloriaga (S3–4)
- Producer: Tom McGillis (S3–4)
- Running time: 22 minutes
- Production companies: Nelvana Limited; Channel 4 (S1); SilverLight Productions Limited (S2); Philippines Animation Studio Inc. (S3-4)

Original release
- Network: Global Television Network (Canada); Channel 4 (United Kingdom, S1–2); Comedy Central (United States, S1-2)
- Release: 3 December 1998 – 29 November 2001

Related
- O Canada

Bob and Margaret is an adult animated sitcom created by David Fine and Alison Snowden and produced by Nelvana Limited in collaboration Channel 4, both financial and artistic. The last two seasons were co-produced without Channel 4, but with continuing British involvement in the animation, cast, and screenwriting. The series was based on the Academy Award-winning short film Bob's Birthday, featuring the same main characters, which won the Best Animated Short Film Oscar in 1994. In Canada, it was the highest-rated, domestically made animated series ever when it aired in primetime on Global.

== Premise ==
The show revolves around a married British couple named Bob and Margaret Fish. They are a middle-class professional working couple of forty-ish with no children and two dogs named William and Elizabeth (named after regal, historical figures), who often serve as surrogates for children and are considered to be characters with personalities in their own right. The couple also work in healthcare settings; Bob is a dentist and Margaret is a chiropodist.

Bob and Margaret struggle with everyday issues and mid-life crises. Stories often revolve around the mundane, but in a way that is eminently relatable, from the trials of shopping to dealing with friends who annoy them but owe them a dinner. They are often seen enjoying various takeaways – various Asian dishes (such as curry and Chinese), and especially pizza – as they navigate their lazy, sedentary homelives.

In the first two seasons, Bob and Margaret live in England, in the South London community of Balham. For the third and fourth seasons, they move to Toronto, Ontario, Canada, allowing the writers to explore the humour of the culture clash. The move was mandated by the realities of funding after Channel 4 backed out, with certain Canadian grants and tax benefits being dependent on stories being physically based in Canada. As such, the transition was necessary to finance the show's continued production. Fine and Snowden chose to take an executive role on these latter two seasons, reviewing scripts and consulting, but not involved in as granular detail as they were for the first two seasons. Snowden continued to provide Margaret's voice, but Brian George replaced Andy Hamilton as Bob's voice.

== Characters ==
=== Lead characters ===
- Bob Fish (voiced by Andy Hamilton in season 1 & 2 later Brian George in season 3 & 4) is a British dentist working in his private practice in Balham later the inner city dental care office in Toronto. He is married to Margaret while co-owning and raising their two dogs (William and Elizabeth). He is often depicted as being fair and understanding but also has his moments of being cocky and arrogant which leads him to his many downfalls.
- Margaret Fish (voiced by Alison Snowden) is a British chiropodist working in her private practice in Balham later the women's clinic in Toronto. She is the wife of Bob and co-owner of their dogs. She is often seen as kind and sensitive to other needs. This leads other characters to mistake her kindness as weakness and take advantage of her. She learns to stand up for herself while learning to find peace with her midlife crisis.

=== Recurring characters ===
- Daisy Fish (voiced by Anna Wing in season 1 & 2 later Deb Filler in season 3 & 4) - mother of Bob, Peter and Susan. She is mostly depicted as mean spirted to Bob while showing admiration and adoration towards his brother Peter.
- Peter Fish (voiced by Steve Coogen) - Bob's brother and a world-class television chef. He lives a wealthy lifestyle and shares two kids (Gerald and Charlotte) with his wife Rosie.
- Rosie Fish (voiced by Sarah Hadland) - Peter's wife and a television producer to Peter's show.
- Gerald and Charlotte Fish (both voiced by Lily Snowden-Fine) - Peter and Rosie's kids with a spoiled upbringing. They misbehave and show very little respect for Bob and Margaret.
- Susan Fish - Bob's sister, a divorcee and single mum.
- Tony and Maureen Heslop - Margaret's parents, whom are often shown to be passive and timid. They harshly judge Margaret, often viewing her as a burden to Bob whom they greatly respect.
- Beany and Boney (Beany voiced by Steve Brody) - Two burglars who often target Bob and Margaret, either through pickpocketing or breaking in to their home, on multiple occasions. They appear to be in a gay relationship.
- Cathy and Ken (voiced by Sarah Hadland and Steve Brody) - An overbearing couple whom Bob and Margaret befriends with. Cathy is aggressive and dominant in her relationship with her boyfriend Ken.
- Eden (voiced by Doon Mackichan) - Margaret's former secretary from her private practice in South London
- Penny (voiced by Doon Mackichan) - Bob's former secretary from his dental office in South London. She is depicted as lazy, rude with an unfriendly attitude either towards Bob or his patients.
- Howard Perkins - Owner of a local flower shop. He appears in multiple episodes either though speaking roles or as a background character.
- Melvin and Cookie Fish (voiced by Wayne Robson and Jayne Eastwood) - Melvin is Bob's Canadian cousin living in the Toronto suburb of Mississauga with his wife Cookie. They are very friendly with Bob and Margaret, but unknowingly cross boundaries which causes annoyance to both Bob and Margaret. They own and raise two aggressive cats named Buster and Bailey.
- Heather (voiced by Vickie Papavs) - Bob's secretary at the inner city dental clinic.
- Ed, Patel, and Audra (Patel voiced by Brian George) - Dental staff who work at the inner city dental clinic with Bob.
- Robin (voiced by Yanna McIntosh) - A reflexologist, who helps Margaret secures her first job at the women's clinic.
- Guinevere Long (voiced by Tracey Hoyt) - A secretary and chiropractic intern who works with Margaret and Robin at the women's clinic.
- Trevor and Joyce (voiced by Dwayne Hill, Joyce first voiced by Robin Duke later Jayne Eastwood) - Bob and Margaret's next door neighbor. Trevor is shown to be lazy while living a carefree lifestyle, while his wife Joyce, a hard smoker resents him for it. They constantly feud and share a son named Gary.
- Dr. Yosselhifer (voiced by Harvey Atkin) - Bob's superior and the president of the council of Canadian dentists. He is egotistical and carries an elitist view of the world. He has a wife named Babs.

== Series overview ==
Season	Episodes	Originally aired		DVD and Blu-ray release date		
Season	Episodes	Season premiere	Season finale	Region 1	Region 2	Region 4
1	13	3 December 1998	25 February 1999	16 February 2010	—N/a	—N/a
2	13	19 August 1999	18 November 1999	25 September 2005	17 July 2006	—N/a
3	13	31 May 2001	23 August 2001	—N/a	—N/a	—N/a
4	13	6 September 2001	29 November 2001	—N/a	—N/a	—N/a

=== Episodes ===
==== Season 1 (1998–99) ====
- All episodes in Season 1 are directed by Jamie Whitney, Andrew Young and Jason Groh.

No. in series	Title	Written by	Original air date
1	"A Tale of Two Dentists"	David Fine	3 December 1998
A new dentist opens a practice right across the road from Bob's and steals all his customers. His receptionist also defects, so Bob hires Penny. But things are not as they seem.
2	"A Night In"	David Fine	10 December 1998
A quiet night at home, unfortunately it falls on a night when there's absolutely nothing to watch on television. Bob and Margaret are concerned about missing the opportunity to have children, so they stay in with a romantic film and they end up going to visit Henry and Judy (Sarah Hadland) with their toddler child, but their obnoxious toddler puts an end to any thoughts of parenthood.
3	"Blood, Sweat, and Tears"	Alison Snowden	17 December 1998
Bob and Margaret decide to get fit and, after profitless attempts at aerobics and workouts, they decide on a friendly game of badminton against Cathy (Sarah Hadland) and her latest boyfriend, Ken (Steve Brody).
4	"Burglary"	Alison Snowden & David Fine	24 December 1998
After Bob and Margaret's home is robbed by Beany (Steve Boney) and Boney they file a police report and an insurance claim. Bob tries to get Margaret to lie on the insurance claim so they can get bigger/newer/flashier/fancier high-tech substitutes. Margaret feels that this is dishonest and leads to high insurance payments; she would rather get comparable substitutes and install a home security system. Meanwhile, the thieves attempt to sell all the stolen goods at a flea market and later return to watch for empty-shipping boxes left for the trash collector to determine who to rob next.
5	"Shopping"	David Fine	31 December 1998
After realizing they spend too much on take out meals and expensive local shops, Bob and Margaret decide to shop at a new discount grocery store out of town, but the expedition is anything either easy or cheap.
6	"The Holiday"	Alison Snowden	7 January 1999
7	"For Pete's Sake"	Alison Snowden	14 January 1999
Bob and Margaret are stuck babysitting their niece and nephew (Charlotte and Gerald, both voiced by Lily Snoden-Fine) after Bob's brother Peter (Steve Coogen), a professional TV chef, along his producer wife Rosie (Sarah Hadland) are going out of the country for a new reality show.
8	"Friends for Dinner"	David Fine	21 January 1999
Bob and Margaret are invited for what they think is dinner by Neil (Jamie Watson) and Moira (Doon) only to spend a discomforted evening drinking wine, eating peanuts, and playing a rather irritating boardgame.
9	"Love's Labours Lost"	Alison Snowden	28 January 1999
10	"The Dental Convention"	Peter Baynham	4 February 1999
Bob isn't thrilled when he is asked by an old colleague to fill in as a guest speaker at the upcoming Dental Convention, but Margaret talks him into it when she finds out it comes with a free stay at a luxury hotel.
11	"Discomfort of Strangers"	David Fine & Alison Snowden	11 February 1999
Just before Bob and Margaret are about to go on a second honeymoon, Bob's Canadian cousin Melvin (Wayne Robson) and his wife Cookie (Jayne Eastwood) from Toronto stop by for an extended visit.
12	"Trick of Treat"	David Fine & Alison Snowden	18 February 1999
13	"Neighbours"	Peter Baynham	25 February 1999
Bob and Margaret become acquainted with their new neighbors, Larry (Jamie Watson) and Kitty (Alison Snowden) along with their kids and invite them to a new restaurant, but the evening becomes a total disaster.

==== Season 2 (1999) ====
No. in series	Title	Directed by	Written by	Original air date
14	"Bob Gets Wired"	Doug Thoms, Karen Lessman, Jamie Whitney, and Harold Harris	Jeremy Hardy	19 August 1999
After Margaret is arrested for shoplifting a bag of sprinkles she mistakenly put in her pocket, Bob wears a wire to exonerate her when the police think she is connected to a fiery dwelling.
15	"No Trouble"	Doug Thoms	Peter Baynham	26 August 1999
16	"The Trouble with Mummy"	Jamie Whitney	Jamie Whitney & David Fine & Alison Snowden	2 September 1999
After his mother's best friend passes away, Bob's siblings think she needs to move to a nursing home so they can sell her house and split the proceeds.
17	"The Fly on the Wall"	Doug Thoms	Tim Fountain	9 September 1999
Bob becomes the subject of a documentary about the dental industry being directed by an ex-classmate, unaware of how he is actually being portrayed.
18	"Problems"	Jamie Whitney	Jeremy Hardy	16 September 1999
19	"A Patient Dies in Bob's Chair"	Doug Thoms	Andy Riley & Kevin Cecil	23 September 1999
Bob loses his job after a patient dies of natural causes during a checkup and the media enrich the story.
20	"Cuckoo in the Nest"	Karen Lessmann and Jamie Whitney	Tim Fountain	7 October 1999
21	"A New Life"	Doug Thoms	Peter Baynham	14 October 1999
Bob becomes fascinated by the prospect of moving into a new, planned community, but it is Margaret who is coveted by the community.
22	"Animal Behaviour"	Karen Lessmann and Jamie Whitney	Rosie Shuster	21 October 1999
23	"Party Politics"	Doug Thoms	Sarah Smith	28 October 1999
24	"Going Dutch"	Karen Lessmann	Sally Phillips	4 November 1999
25	"My Foot Hurts"	Karen Lessmann	Andy Riley & Kevin Cecil	11 November 1999
26	"A Bob or Two"	Karen Lessmann	Tim Fountain & David Fine	18 November 1999
Bob and Margaret argue on what to do when they purchases a painting from a neighbour's rummage sale and is shocked to learn that it may be worth a fortune.

==== Season 3 (2001) ====
No. in series	Title	Directed by	Written by	Original air date
27	"Stranded in Toronto"	Julian Harris	Rosalind Shuster	31 May 2001
Bob and Margaret plan a vacation to New York, but poor weather forces a layover in Toronto while their dogs are left in the care of Bob's assistant Penny, who promptly leaves them for an outing with her boyfriend.
28	"Strangers in a Strange Land"	Dan Poitras	Valri Blomfield	7 June 2001
Bob and Margaret become pariahs in London after they are accused of leaving their dogs unattended and neglected while they are stuck in Toronto.
29	"Margaret Gets a Job"	Julian Harris	Rosalind Shuster & David Cole	14 June 2001
Margaret, after she and Bob immigrated to Toronto to retain custody of their dogs, struggles to find a job while Bob recently has one.
30	"'Til Death Do Us Part"	Dan Poitras	Heather Conkie	21 June 2001
Bob is tricked into buying a cemetery plot for him and Margaret as an anniversary present. Meanwhile Margaret takes Cookie and Melvin's cats Buster and Bailey to the veterinarian. This happens when the cats become severely ill after eating grass from the backyard of Bob and Margaret's home.
31	"The Wedding"	Julian Harris	David Cole	28 June 2001
Bob and Margaret are invited to the wedding of Tiffany and Ray (voiced by Christian Potenza) hosted by Bob's cousin Melvin.
32	"Fish at the Bat"	Dan Poitras	Matthew Cope	5 July 2001
In order to secure funding for new dental equipment for his office, Bob joins his office's baseball team (the dental care drillers) to appease his boss Dr. Yosselhifer (Harvey Atkins).
33	"Over-Exposed"	Dan Poitras	Valri Blomfield & David Cole; Story idea by: Andrew Nicholls & Darrell Vickers	12 July 2001
Margaret meets Alice (voiced by Linda Kash) a neighbor who lives near by. Both accidentally receives each other photo packages.
34	"Age Before Beauty"	Julian Harris	Leila Basen & David Preston	19 July 2001
Margaret fears she no longer attractive to Bob.
35	"Book Club"	Julian Harris	Heather Conkie	26 July 2001
Bob and Margaret joins a book club.
36	"On Location"	Julian Harris	Valri Bromfield	2 August 2001
When a movie is being filmed right next door, Bob and Margaret both find themselves involved with the production.
37	"Cottage Country"	Dan Poitras	Terry Saltsman	9 August 2001
Bob and Margaret is invited to spend the weekend at Dr. Yosselheifer (voiced by Harvey Atkins) and his wife Babs cottage.
38	"Driving Bob"	Julian Harris	Valri Bromfield	16 August 2001
Bob's driver license is expired and must work to get a new one.
39	"Undefined Border"	Julian Harris	David Cole	23 August 2001
Bob and Margaret goes cross border shopping in the states.

==== Season 4 (2001) ====
No. in series	Title	Directed by	Written by	Original air date
40	"New Lease on Life"	David Thomas	Matthew Cope & David Cole	6 September 2001
41	"Jury Duty"	David Thomas	David Cole	13 September 2001
42	"The Player"	Harold Harris	Chas Lawther and Gail Kerbel	20 September 2001
43	"The Getaway"	David Thomas	Matthew Cope and David Cole	27 September 2001
44	"Mummy's Boy"	David Thomas	Julie Lacey	4 October 2001
45	"Gone to Seed"	David Thomas	Terry Saltsman	11 October 2001
46	"The Candidate"	Julian Harris	Terry Saltsman	18 October 2001
47	"Life Saver"	Julian Harris	Jennifer Cowan	25 October 2001
48	"I, Bob"	Julian Harris	David Cole	1 November 2001
49	"Mastermind"	Julian Harris	David Cole	8 November 2001
50	"Outward Bound"	David Thomas	David Fine & David Cole	15 November 2001
51	"Gary"	David Thomas	Chas Lawther & Gail Kerbel	22 November 2001
52	"A Very Fishy Christmas"	David Thomas	David Fine	29 November 2001

== Telecast and home media ==
The series was shown in the UK on Channel 4 and Ftn, in the US on Comedy Central, and in Germany and France on Arte. Comedy Central only showed the two "London" seasons. The third and fourth "Toronto" seasons were eventually shown (almost two years after Comedy Central showed the final second-season episode) on the pay network Showtime.

Bob and Margaret formerly aired on Locomotion, and Adult Swim in Latin America. In Brazil, Cartoon Network aired its four seasons on the Adult Swim block. The London seasons also get shown in the United Kingdom, currently on Channel 4. It also had a brief run years later on the Canadian YTV. In December 2013, biTe started to air this series (until the rebrand to Makeful on 24 August 2015).

=== Home media ===
==== United Kingdom ====
Two VHS tapes of the series containing three Series 1 episodes each were released in 1999 by Video Collection International under their Channel 4 Video imprint.

The entirety of Series 2 was released on DVD in July 2006 by Maverick Entertainment.

==== North America ====
In 1999, Season 1 was released on six VHS volumes by Paramount Home Entertainment containing two episodes each.

In Canada, the series has seen DVD releases by Kaboom! Entertainment (now Phase 4 Films). Season 2 was released in 2005, and Season 1 was released in February 2010. Both releases are two-disc sets containing all 13 episodes of each season.

The show currently streams on Tubi.

== See also ==
- O Canada, Cartoon Network series that featured "Bob's Birthday"
- Ricky Sprocket: Showbiz Boy
