= Bob's Birthday =

1993 Canadian short film

- Directed by: Alison Snowden; David Fine
- Written by: Alison Snowden; David Fine
- Produced by: Alison Snowden; David Fine
- Starring: Andy Hamilton; Alison Snowden; Harry Enfield; Andrew MacLachlan; Tessa Wojiczak; Sally Grace
- Cinematography: Pepi Lenzi
- Edited by: Li Westrex Recording System
- Music by: Patrick Godfrey
- Production companies: National Film Board of Canada; Channel 4
- Release date: 26 December 1993
- Countries: Canada; United Kingdom
- Language: English

Bob's Birthday is a 1993 Canadian-British animated short by Alison Snowden and David Fine, winner of the Academy Award for Best Animated Short Film at the 67th Academy Awards, and serves as the pilot to the animated series Bob and Margaret. It features a humorous look at how Margaret plans to throw a surprise birthday party for Bob on his 40th birthday, as he struggles with the sudden impact of middle age. Bob's Birthday has won 10 awards, one of which includes the National Film Board of Canada's 60th Oscar nomination. The film was inspired by the creators, Alison Snowden and David Fine, both turning 30.

== Plot ==
Bob Fish's wife, Margaret, is attempting to throw a surprise birthday celebration for Bob while he is at work; she tells him that they are going to a restaurant when she calls him. Bob works as a dentist and is seemingly going through a mid-life crisis on his 40th birthday. The short film shows Bob staring at a young woman in the office while his wife is at home working on the surprise party. She has a closet full of decorations to make the celebration fun for everyone. Back in the office, one of Bob's patients goes on to tell him that he has read that dentists have the highest suicide rate of all professions and continues to ask about his hours and salary while Bob works on the patient's teeth.

The film continues at Bob and Margaret's home where all of their friends have arrived for the party. As they await Bob's presence, Margaret watches the time and quickly checks the window to notice he is driving down the road and tells the guests to hide until she gives a signal for them to come out. When Bob arrives, he walks directly to the kitchen, disregarding Margaret, and then asks her if she is bothered that they never had children and questions whether he should leave his job as a dentist. The guests continue to hide while Bob goes upstairs to change. As he is changing he comes down the stairs not wearing pants and Margaret frantically tells him to put pants on. He takes this to offence and says that she used to love when he did that, furthering his mid-life crisis even more.

Bob continues speaking about how all of their friends, who are hiding behind couches and listening, are not really their friends and that they do not even like them, and suggests that Margaret should find another husband. He yells up to Margaret, who is in the bedroom and upset over the disaster of a surprise party, and says that they should have children. He goes on to ask if she finds him attractive while she brings down pants and trousers for him. Bob goes outside to wait in the car because he still believes they are going out for dinner. Margaret follows him, knowing the party she had planned is now destroyed, and leaves all their friends she had invited behind.

== Cast ==
- Alison Snowden as Margaret Fish
- Andy Hamilton as Dr. Bob Fish
- Harry Enfield
- Andrew MacLachlan
- Tessa Wojtczak
- Sally Grace

== Production ==
The short film took two years to complete. The movie had a budget of $335,000, partially financed by the National Film Board of Canada. David Fine and Alison Snowden met as students at the National Film and Television School in 1980, and later went on to produce this Oscar winning short animated film.

== Critical reception ==
The short film has had few critics to share how well the movie portrays a mid-life crisis at the age of 40. One critic review from the Toronto Star in 1995 said "The National Film Board's animated short, Bob's Birthday, Canada's only contender for an Oscar this year, is not a party for kids. It's not a party at all. It's a wry tale of could-be-real, mid-life crisis that animators Alison Snowden and David Fine need just 12 minutes and 18 seconds to tell more effectively than most documentaries on the subject."

The film was a Genie Award nominee for Best Theatrical Short Film at the 15th Genie Awards.

== See also ==
- George and Rosemary
- Bob and Margaret
