= List of Millennial Academy Award winners and nominees =

Totals
Award	Wins	Nominations
Picture	3	27
Director	3	10
Original Screenplay	4	17
Adapted Screenplay	4	19
Leading Actor	3	17
Leading Actress	5	38
Supporting Actor	2	16
Supporting Actress	7	36
Animated Feature	2	16
Documentary Feature	3	26
Live Action Short Film	8	32
Animated Short Film	4	29
Documentary Short Film	4	16
Wins	52
Nominations	280

This article lists individuals (including filmmakers, actors, actresses, and others) born from 1981 to 1996, colloquially known as Millennials (also known as Generation Y), who were nominated or won an Academy Award starting in the early 1990s.

While most winners and nominees are older generations before Millennials, Anna Paquin is the first Millennial member to be nominated and win an Academy Award for her debut performance of Flora McGrath in the historical romantic film The Piano (1993).

== Production ==
=== Best Picture ===
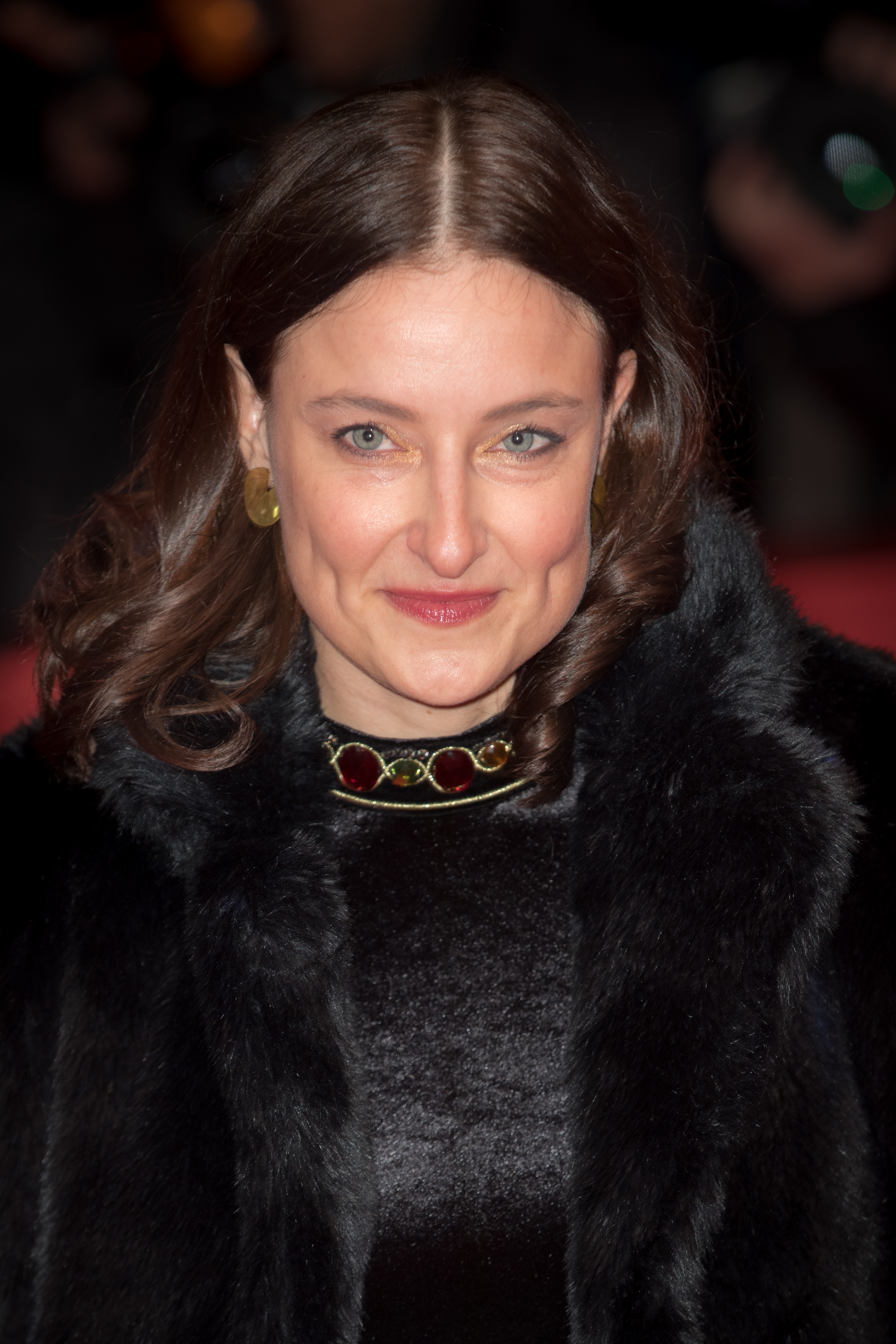
Romanski in 2018

Picture
Year	Name	Born	Film	Result	Notes
2012 (85th)	Dan Janvey Josh Penn	January 1984 1984	Beasts of the Southern Wild	Nominated	
2012 (85th)	Megan Ellison	January 31, 1986	Zero Dark Thirty	Nominated	
2013 (86th)	Megan Ellison	January 31, 1986	American Hustle	Nominated	
2013 (86th)	Megan Ellison	January 31, 1986	Her	Nominated	
2014 (87th)	Helen Estabrook	1983	Whiplash	Nominated	
2014 (87th)	Nora Grossman	1983	The Imitation Game	Nominated	
2016 (89th)	Fred Berger	May 10, 1981	La La Land	Nominated	
2016 (89th)	Adele Romanski	November 10, 1982	Moonlight	Won	
2017 (90th)	Megan Ellison	January 31, 1986	Phantom Thread	Nominated	
2017 (90th)	Greta Gerwig	August 4, 1983	Lady Bird	Nominated	
2020 (93rd)	Emerald Fennell Josey McNamara	October 1, 1985 February 1986	Promising Young Woman	Nominated	
2020 (93rd)	Dan Janvey Chloé Zhao	January 1984 March 31, 1982	Nomadland	Won	
2021 (94th)	Tim White Trevor White	1983 1985	King Richard	Nominated	
2021 (94th)	Teruhisa Yamamoto	1981	Drive My Car	Nominated	
2022 (95th)	Jonathan Wang Daniel Kwan Daniel Scheinert	1984 February 10, 1988 June 7, 1987	Everything Everywhere All at Once	Won	
2023 (96th)	Tom Ackerley Margot Robbie	June 13, 1990 July 2, 1990	Barbie	Nominated	
2023 (96th)	Cord Jefferson	1982	American Fiction	Nominated	
2023 (96th)	Emma Stone	November 6, 1988	Poor Things	Nominated	
2024 (97th)	Brady Corbet	August 17, 1988	The Brutalist	Nominated	
2025 (98th)	Emma Stone	November 6, 1988	Bugonia	Nominated	
2025 (98th)	Timothée Chalamet	December 27, 1995	Marty Supreme	Nominated	
2025 (98th)	Andrea Berentsen Ottmar	1990	Sentimental Value	Nominated	
2025 (98th)	Zinzi Coogler Sev Ohanian Ryan Coogler	April 18, 1985 June 2, 1987 May 23, 1986	Sinners	Nominated	
2025 (98th)	Ashley Schlaifer Michael Heimler	1984 September 1987	Train Dreams	Nominated	

=== Best Animated Feature ===
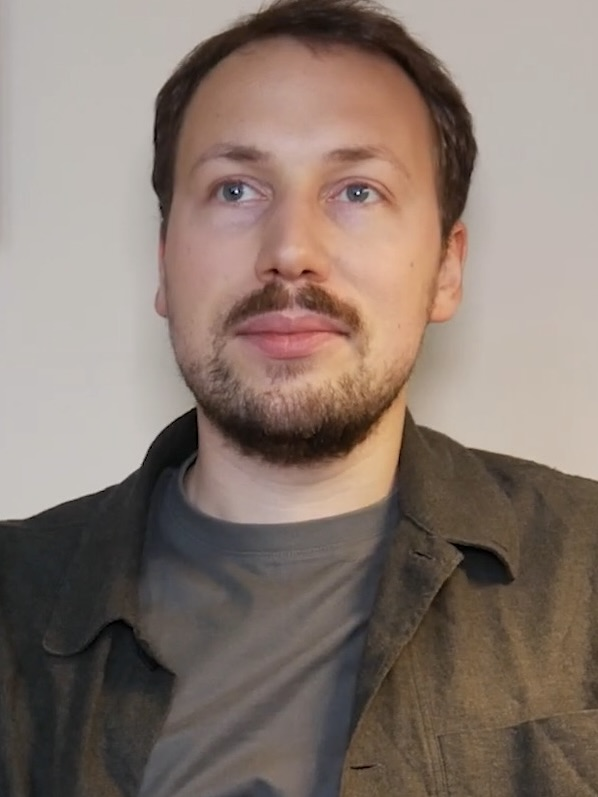
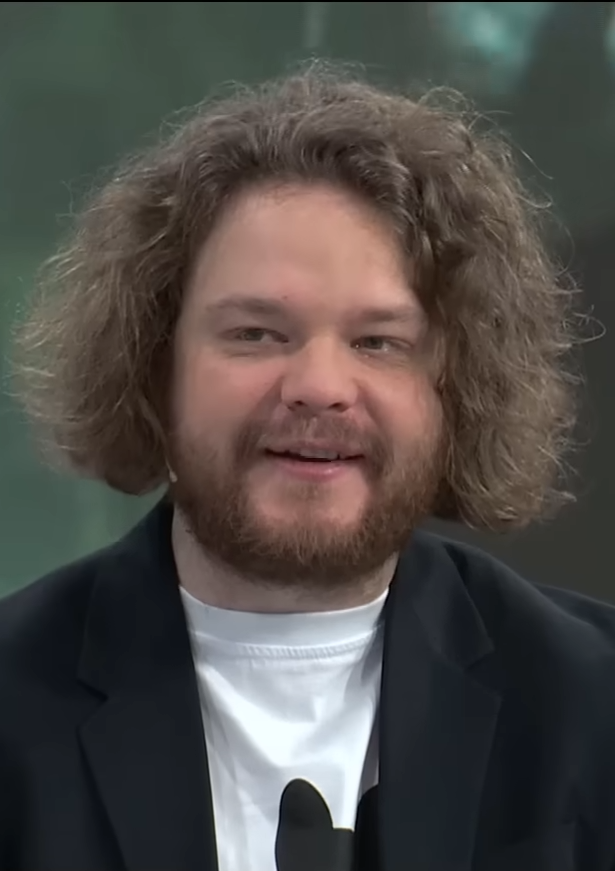
Zilbalodis and Kaža in 2025

Animated Feature Film
Year	Name	Born	Film	Result	Notes
2013 (86th)	Benjamin Renner	November 14, 1983	Ernest & Celestine	Nominated	Renner is the first Millennial to be nominated and the youngest nominee in this category at age 30 until 2025.
2020 (93rd)	Richard Phelan	1982	A Shaun the Sheep Movie: Farmageddon	Nominated	
2021 (94th)	Carlos López Estrada	September 12, 1988	Raya and the Last Dragon	Nominated	
2021 (94th)	Charlotte de la Gournerie Jonas Poher Rasmussen	January 15, 1989 May 19, 1981	Flee	Nominated	
2021 (94th)	Mike Rianda	December 25, 1984	The Mitchells vs. the Machines	Nominated	
2022 (95th)	Dean Fleischer Camp Elisabeth Holm	February 28, 1984 1986	Marcel the Shell with Shoes On	Nominated	
2022 (95th)	Domee Shi	September 8, 1989	Turning Red	Nominated	
2023 (96th)	Karen Ann Ryan	January 19, 1984	Nimona	Nominated	
2023 (96th)	Sandra Tapia Díaz	1983	Robot Dreams	Nominated	
2024 (97th)	Matīss Kaža Gints Zilbalodis	August 31, 1995 April 13, 1994	Flow	Won	Kaža and Zilbalodis became the first Millennials to win in that category.
2025 (98th)	Ugo Bienvenu Félix de Givry Natalie Portman	May 10, 1987 December 23, 1991 June 9, 1981	Arco	Nominated	
2025 (98th)	Madeline Sharafian Domee Shi Adrian Molina	February 1, 1993 September 8, 1989 August 23, 1985	Elio	Nominated	
2025 (98th)	Maggie Kang	1981–1982	KPop Demon Hunters	Won	
2025 (98th)	Nidia Santiago	September 18, 1981	Little Amélie or the Character of Rain	Nominated	

=== Best Documentary Feature ===
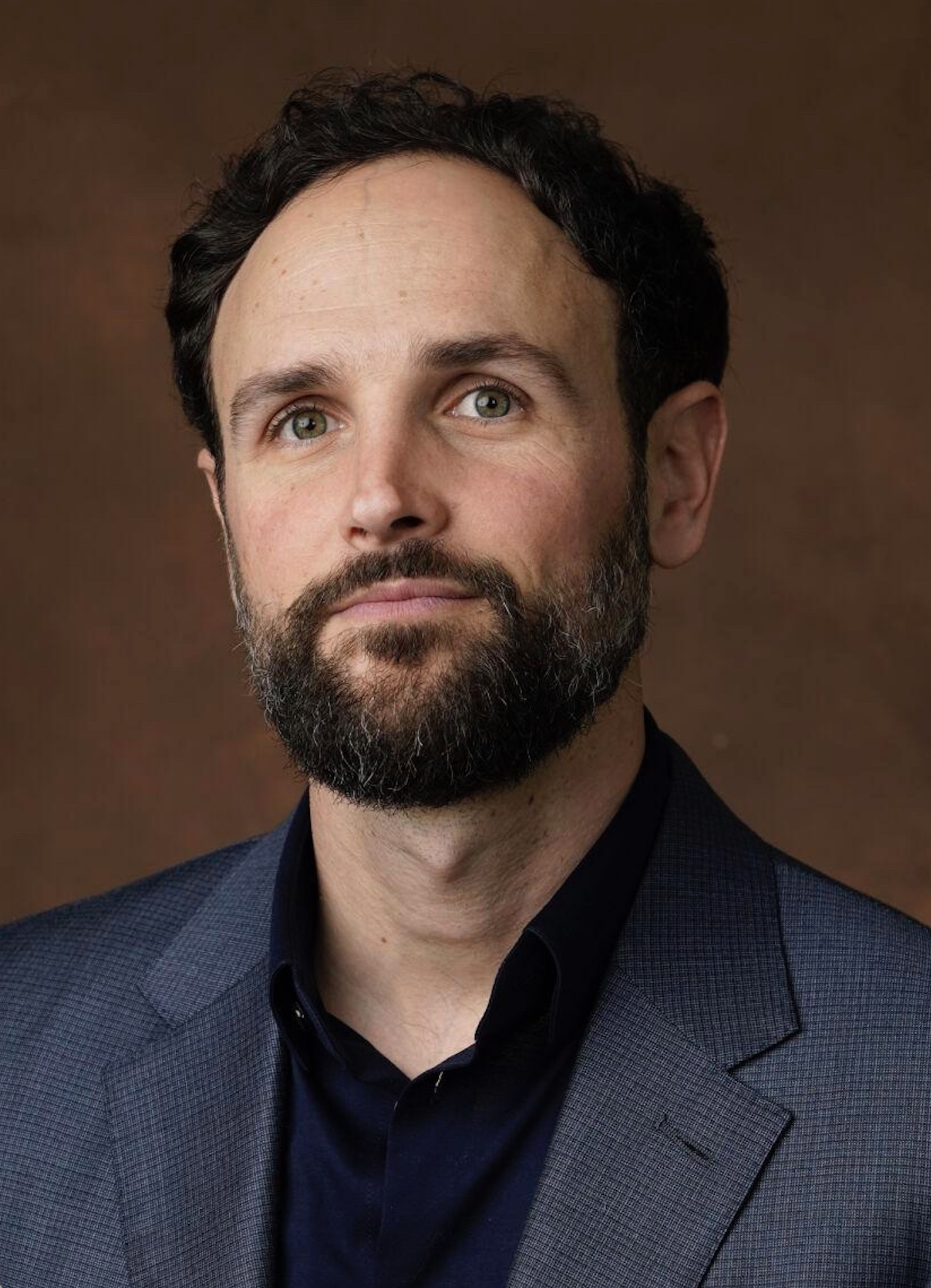
Boris in 2023

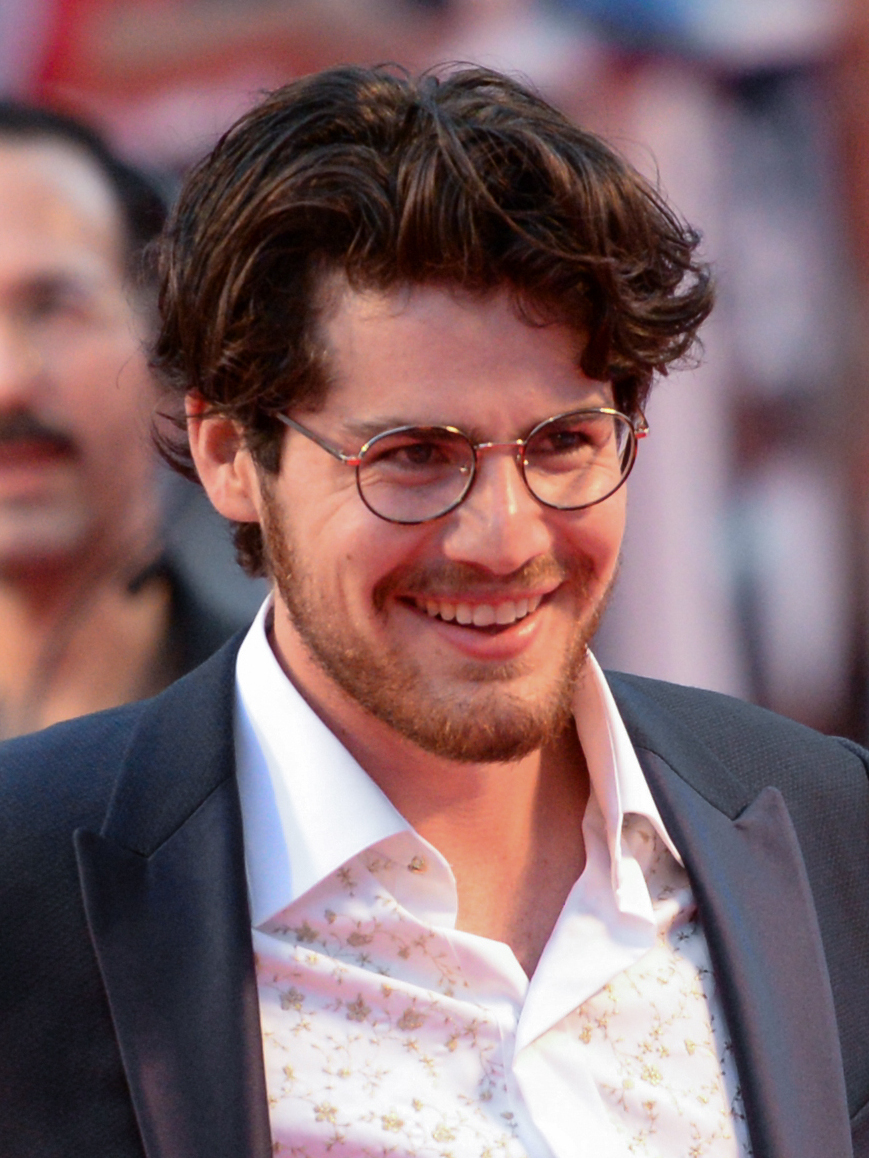
Roher in 2019

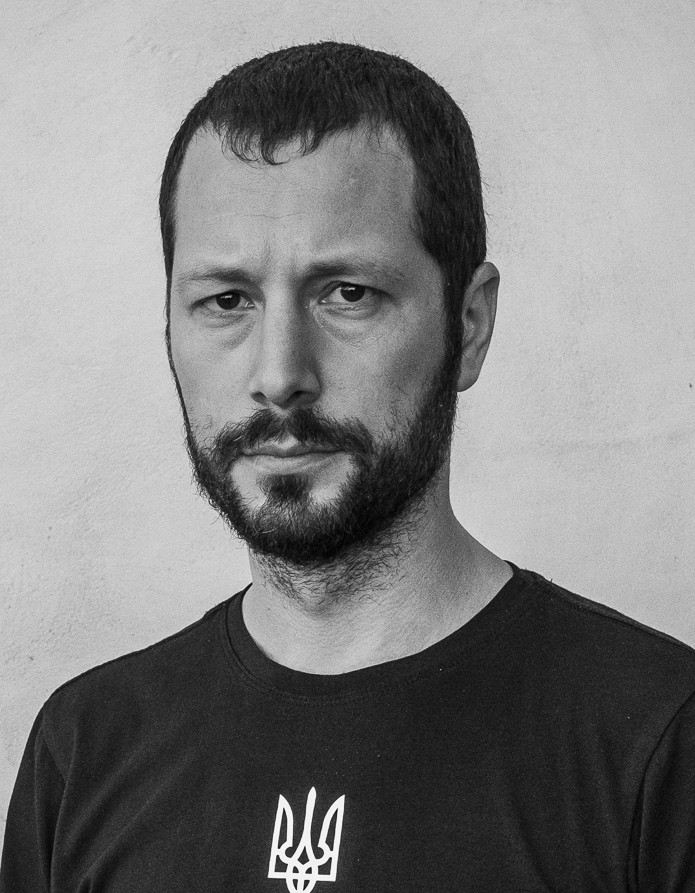
Chernov in 2022

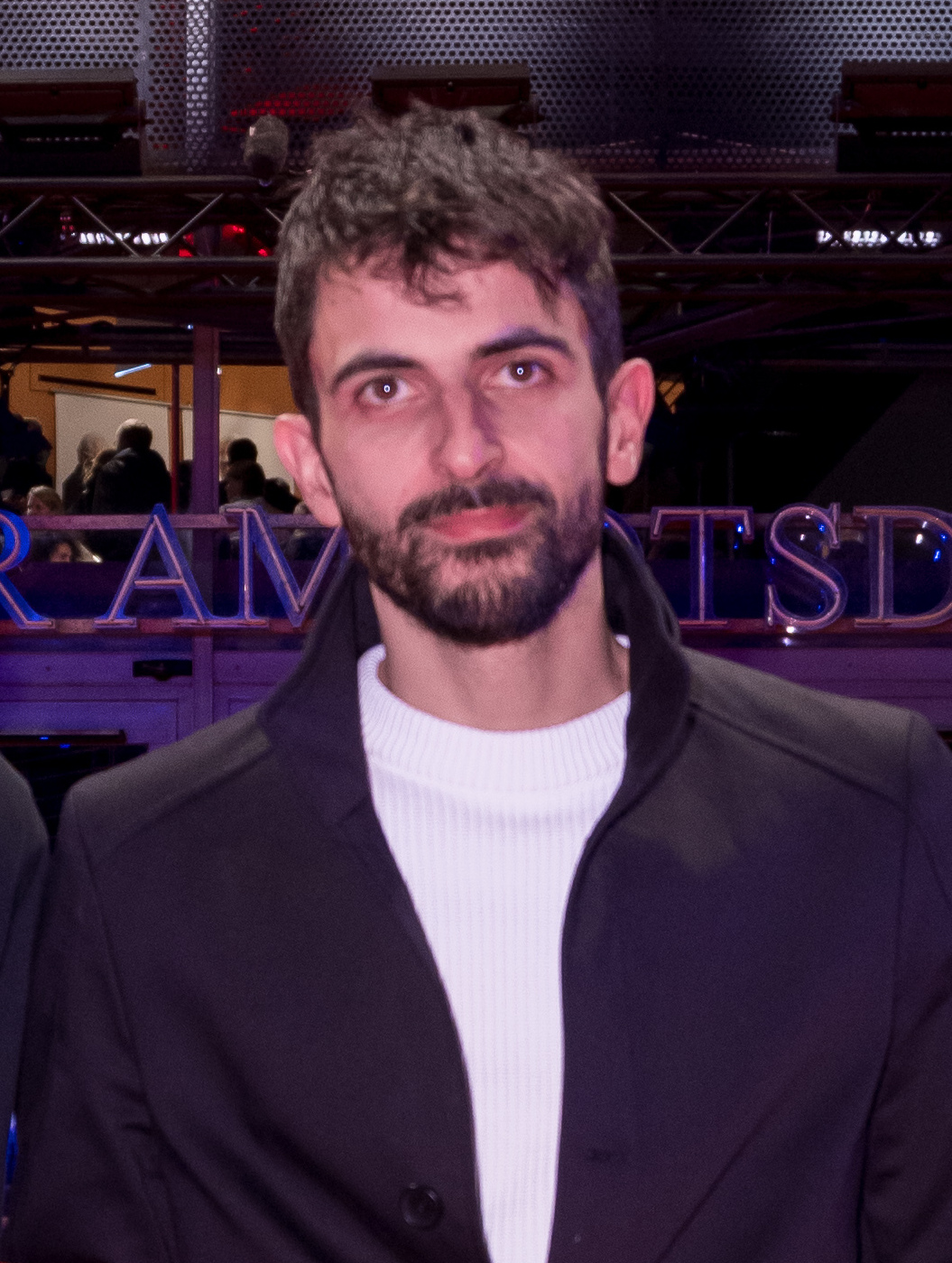

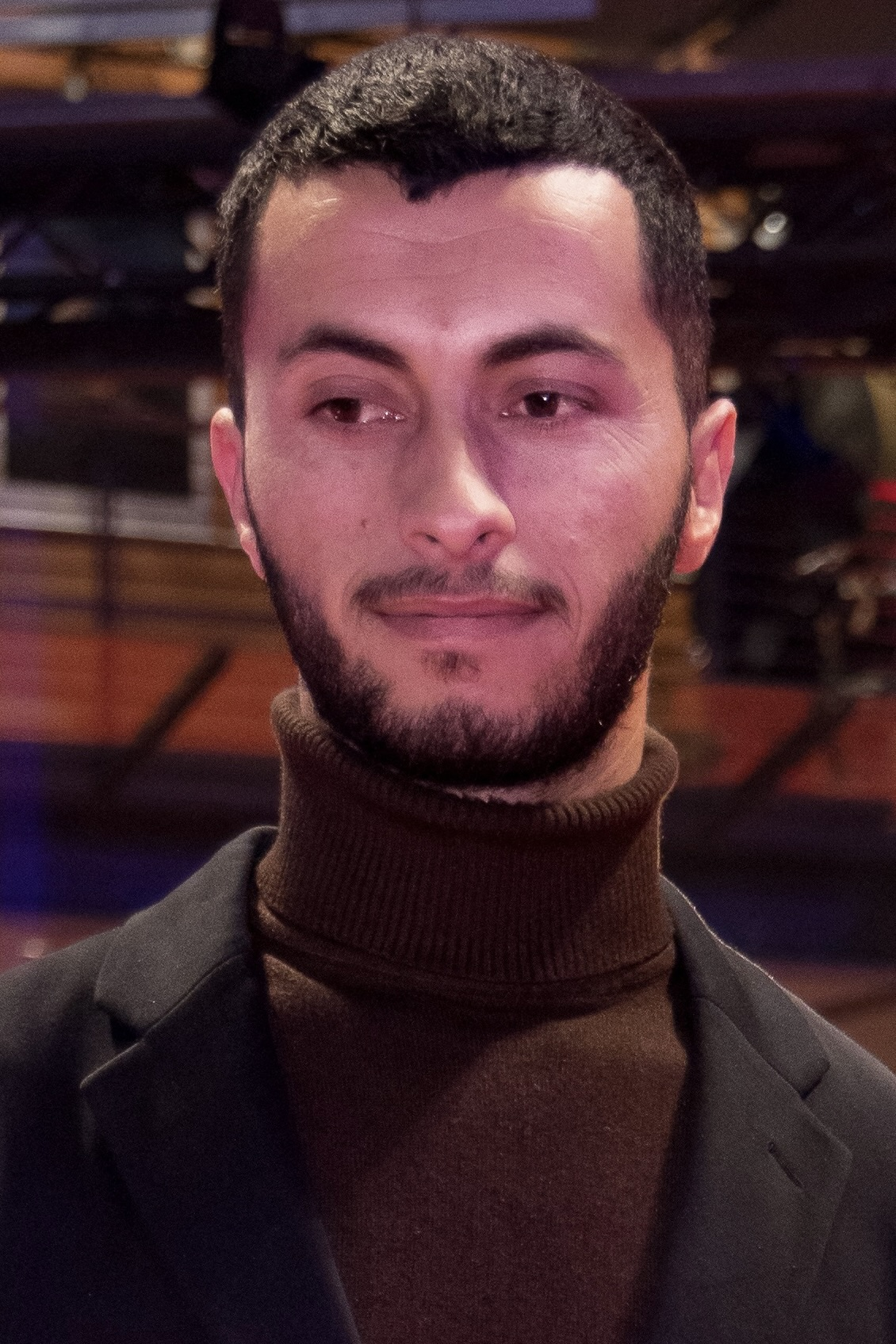
Abraham and Adra in 2024

Documentary Feature Film
Year	Name	Born	Film	Result	Notes
2013 (86th)	Karim Amer	November 10, 1983	The Square	Nominated	
2013 (86th)	Zachary Heinzerling	January 1, 1984	Cutie and the Boxer	Nominated	
2014 (87th)	John Maloof	1981	Finding Vivian Maier	Nominated	
2015 (88th)	Matthew Heineman	June 6, 1983	Cartel Land	Nominated	
2017 (90th)	Kareem Abeed Feras Fayyad	1984 September 20, 1988	Last Men in Aleppo	Nominated	
2017 (90th)	JR	February 22, 1983	Faces Places	Nominated	
2018 (91st)	Bing Liu	1989	Minding the Gap	Nominated	
2018 (91st)	RaMell Ross	1982	Hale County This Morning, This Evening	Nominated	
2019 (92nd)	Waad Al-Kateab	1991	For Sama	Nominated	
2019 (92nd)	Shane Boris Petra Costa	1981 July 8, 1984	The Edge of Democracy	Nominated	
2019 (92nd)	Feras Fayyad	September 20, 1988	The Cave	Nominated	
2019 (92nd)	Tamara Kotevska	August 6, 1993	Honeyland	Nominated	
2020 (93rd)	Maite Alberdi	March 29, 1983	The Mole Agent	Nominated	
2020 (93rd)	Garrett Bradley	1986	Time	Nominated	
2020 (93rd)	Bianca Oana	1986	Collective	Nominated	
2021 (94th)	Charlotte de la Gournerie Jonas Poher Rasmussen	January 15, 1989 May 19, 1981	Flee	Nominated	
2022 (95th)	Shane Boris	1981	Fire of Love	Nominated	
2022 (95th)	Shane Boris Daniel Roher	1981 1993	Navalny	Won	Roher became the first Millennial (born in the 1990s) to win in that category.
2022 (95th)	Shaunak Sen	June 26, 1987	All That Breathes	Nominated	
2023 (96th)	Maite Alberdi	March 29, 1983	The Eternal Memory	Nominated	
2023 (96th)	Mstyslav Chernov	1985	20 Days in Mariupol	Won	
2024 (97th)	Basel Adra Yuval Abraham Hamdan Ballal	June 13, 1996 1989 1995	No Other Land	Won	For the first time, all nominees in that category had at least one Millennial nominated.
2024 (97th)	Brendan Bellomo	September 20, 1984	Porcelain War	Nominated	For the first time, all nominees in that category had at least one Millennial nominated.
2024 (97th)	Shiori Itō Eric Nyari	May 17, 1989 October 20, 1981	Black Box Diaries	Nominated	For the first time, all nominees in that category had at least one Millennial nominated.
2024 (97th)	Emily Kassie Julian Brave NoiseCat	December 15, 1992 March 18, 1993	Sugarcane	Nominated	For the first time, all nominees in that category had at least one Millennial nominated.
2024 (97th)	Daan Milius	1988	Soundtrack to a Coup d'Etat	Nominated	For the first time, all nominees in that category had at least one Millennial nominated.

=== Best Live Action Short Film ===
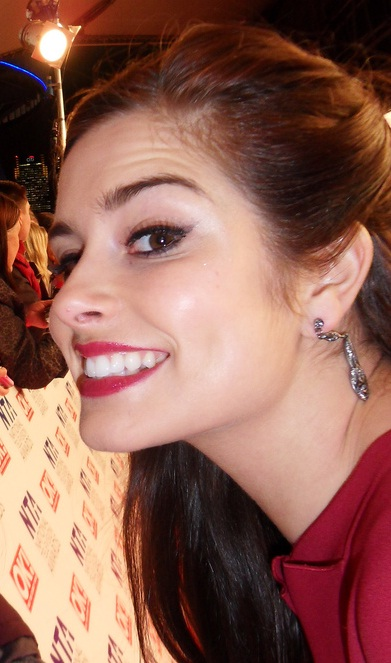
Shenton in 2009

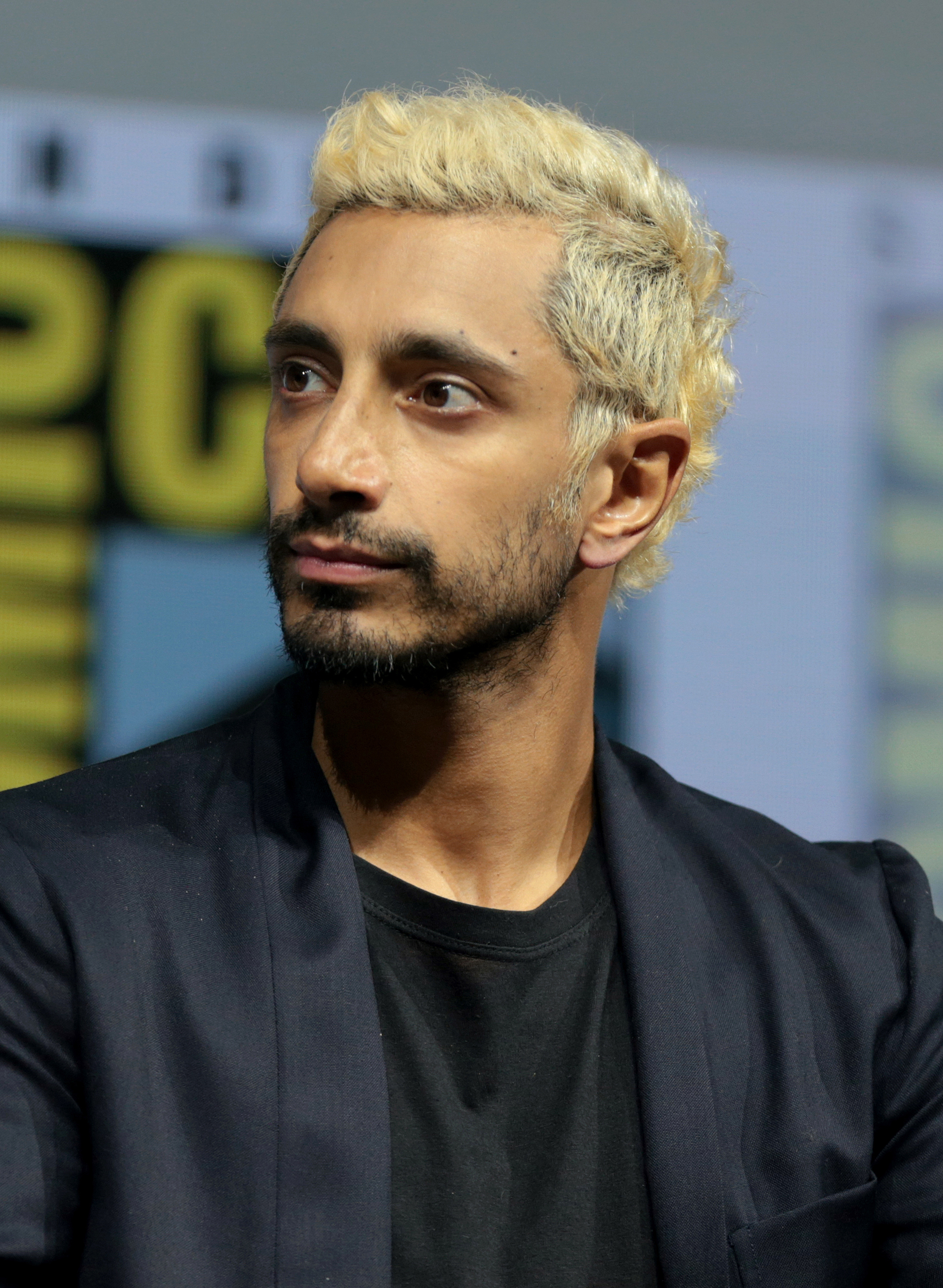
Ahmed in 2018

Live Action Short Film
Year	Name	Born	Film	Result	Notes
2010 (83rd)	Tanel Toom	November 1, 1982	The Confession	Nominated	
2012 (85th)	Tom Van Avermaet	July 22, 1982	Death of a Shadow (Dood van een Schaduw)	Nominated	
2012 (85th)	Yan England	December 9, 1981	Henry	Nominated	
2013 (86th)	Baldwin Li	1982	The Voorman Problem	Nominated	
2014 (87th)	Stefan Eichenberger	1984	Parvaneh	Nominated	
2014 (87th)	Hu Wei	1983	Butter Lamp (La Lampe Au Beurre De Yak)	Nominated	
2015 (88th)	Serena Armitage	1981	Stutterer	Won	
2015 (88th)	Basil Khalil	August 31, 1981	Ave Maria	Nominated	
2015 (88th)	Patrick Vollrath	1985	Everything Will Be Okay (Alles Wird Gut)	Nominated	
2016 (89th)	Aske Bang	April 1, 1988	Silent Nights	Nominated	
2016 (89th)	Kristóf Deák	June 7, 1982	Sing	Won	
2016 (89th)	Timo von Gunten	December 15, 1989	La femme et le TGV	Nominated	
2017 (90th)	Josh Lawson	June 22, 1981	The Eleven O'Clock	Nominated	
2017 (90th)	Chris Overton Rachel Shenton	May 5, 1989 December 21, 1987	The Silent Child	Won	
2017 (90th)	Tobias Rosen	September 28, 1983	Watu Wote: All of Us	Nominated	
2017 (90th)	Kevin Wilson Jr.	1990	My Nephew Emmett	Nominated	
2018 (91st)	Jérémy Comte	1990	Fauve	Nominated	
2018 (91st)	Rodrigo Sorogoyen	September 16, 1981	Mother	Nominated	
2019 (92nd)	Delphine Girard	January 14, 1990	A Sister	Nominated	
2019 (92nd)	Damien Megherbi	1985	Nefta Football Club	Nominated	
2020 (93rd)	Travon Free	1984/1985	Two Distant Strangers	Won	
2020 (93rd)	Shira Hochman Tomer Shushan	1985 1987	White Eye	Nominated	
2020 (93rd)	Elvira Lind	October 28, 1981	The Letter Room	Nominated	
2021 (94th)	Riz Ahmed Aneil Karia	December 1, 1982 1984	The Long Goodbye	Won	
2021 (94th)	Maria Brendle	October 3, 1983	Ala Kachuu – Take and Run	Nominated	
2021 (94th)	Tadeusz Łysiak	1993	The Dress	Nominated	
2022 (95th)	Tom Berekley Ross White	1996	An Irish Goodbye	Won	Berekley and White became the firsts born in the 1990s to win in that category.
2022 (95th)	Alice Rohrwacher	December 29, 1981	Le pupille	Nominated	
2023 (96th)	Lasse Lyskjær Noer	1991	Knight of Fortune	Nominated	
2024 (97th)	Victoria Warmerdam	1991	I'm Not a Robot	Won	
2025 (98th)	Julia Aks	October 2, 1990	Jane Austen's Period Drama	Nominated	
2025 (98th)	Natalie Musteata	1986	Two People Exchanging Saliva	Won	

=== Best Animated Short Film ===
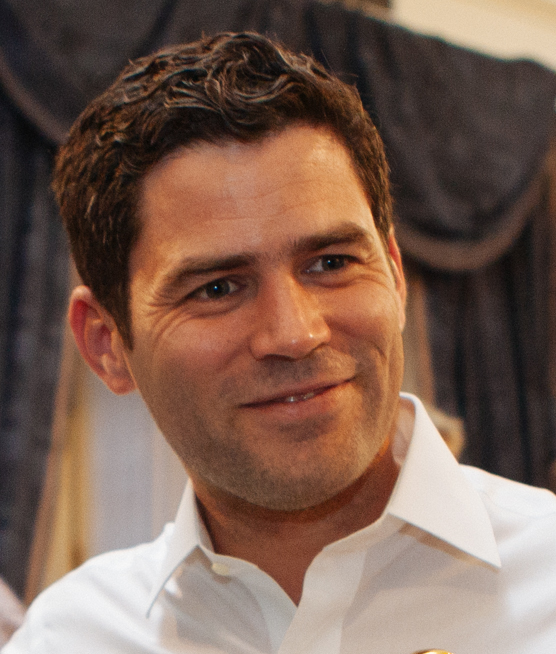

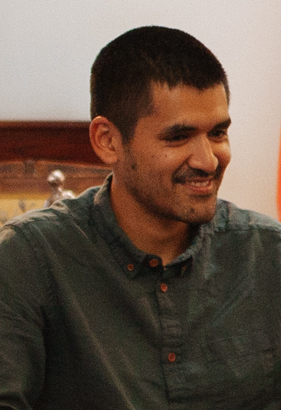
Escala and Osorio in 2016

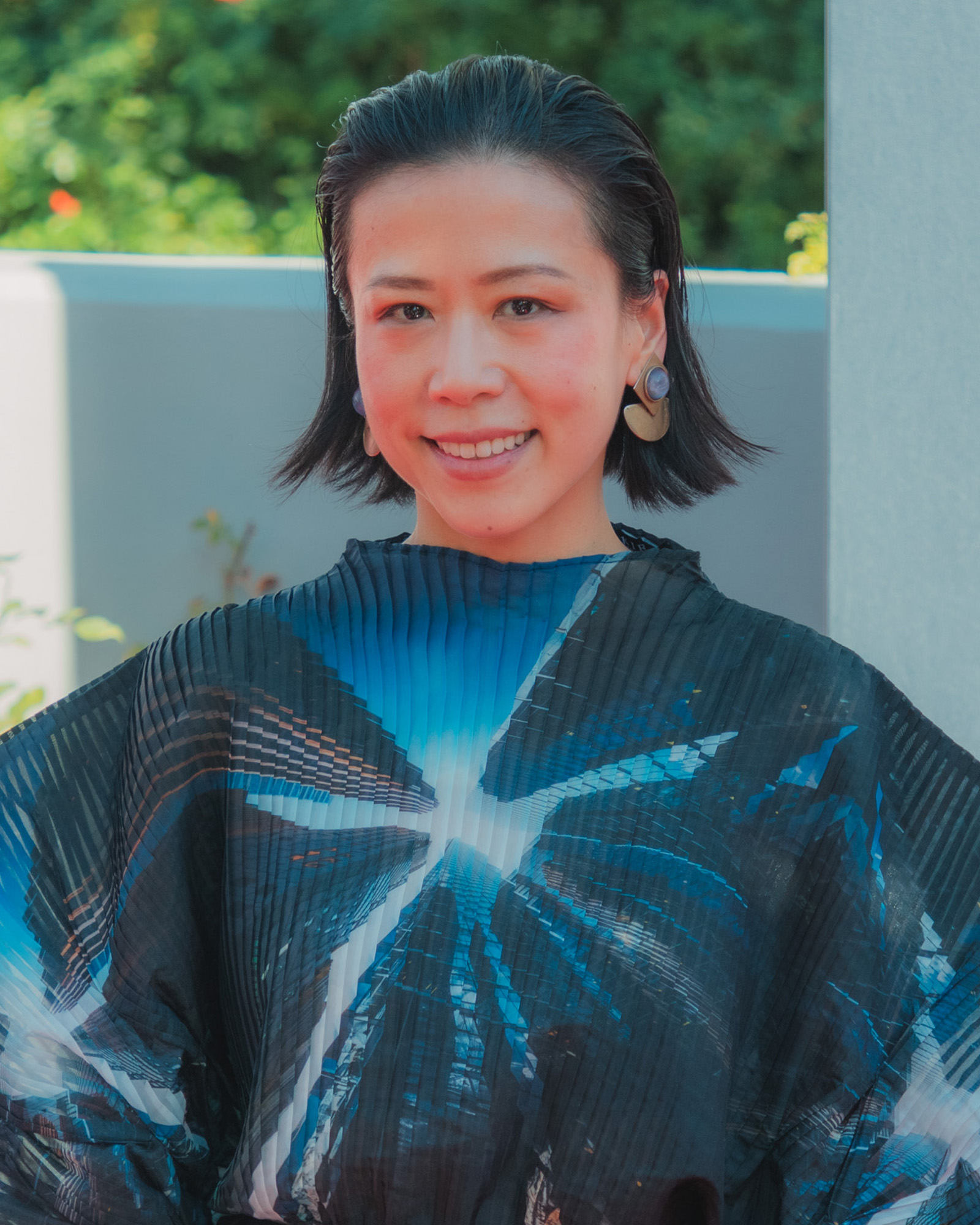
Shi in 2026

Animated Short Film
Year	Name	Born	Film	Result	Notes
2009 (82nd)	Javier Recio Gracia	July 1981	The Lady and the Reaper	Nominated	
2010 (83rd)	Bastien Dubois	September 8, 1983	Madagascar, a Journey Diary	Nominated	
2010 (83rd)	Max Lang	1982	The Gruffalo	Nominated	
2012 (85th)	Minkyu Lee	1985	Adam and Dog	Nominated	
2012 (85th)	Fodhla Cronin O'Reilly Timothy Reckart	1986	Head Over Heels	Nominated	
2013 (86th)	Jan Lachauer Max Lang	1983 1982	Room on the Broom	Nominated	
2015 (88th)	Pato Escala Pierart Gabriel Osorio Vargas	May 28, 1982 February 25, 1984	Bear Story	Won	
2017 (90th)	Victor Caire Gabriel Grapperon	1993	Garden Party	Nominated	
2017 (90th)	Ru Kuwahata Max Porter	1981	Negative Space	Nominated	
2017 (90th)	Jan Lachauer	1983	Revolting Rhymes	Nominated	
2018 (91st)	Louise Bagnall	1985	Late Afternoon	Nominated	
2018 (91st)	Andrew Chesworth	1985	One Small Step	Nominated	
2018 (91st)	Domee Shi	September 8, 1989	Bao	Won	
2019 (92nd)	Matthew A. Cherry	December 14, 1981	Hair Love	Won	
2019 (92nd)	Daria Kashcheeva	April 1, 1986	Daughter	Nominated	
2019 (92nd)	Siqi Song	1989	Sister	Nominated	
2019 (92nd)	Rosana Sullivan	November 21, 1983	Kitbull	Nominated	
2020 (93rd)	Adrien Mérigeau	1983	Genius Loci	Nominated	
2020 (93rd)	Erick Oh	1984	Opera	Nominated	
2020 (93rd)	Madeline Sharafian	February 1, 1993	Burrow	Nominated	
2021 (94th)	Mikey Please	April 1, 1984	Robin Robin	Nominated	
2022 (95th)	João Gonzalez	February 11, 1996	Ice Merchants	Nominated	
2022 (95th)	Sara Gunnarsdóttir	January 20, 1982	My Year of Dicks	Nominated	
2022 (95th)	Lachlan Pendragon	1996	An Ostrich Told Me the World Is Fake and I Think I Believe It	Nominated	
2023 (96th)	Amit Gicelter Tal Kantor	April 25, 1981 November 19, 1988	Letter to a Pig	Nominated	
2024 (97th)	Loïc Espuche	September 17, 1989	Yuck!	Nominated	
2024 (97th)	Nina Gantz	May 26, 1987	Wander to Wonder	Nominated	
2024 (97th)	Nicolas Keppens	July 5, 1989	Beautiful Men	Nominated	
2024 (97th)	Hossein Molayemi Shirin Sohani	1982 1986	In the Shadow of the Cypress	Won	

=== Best Documentary Short Film ===
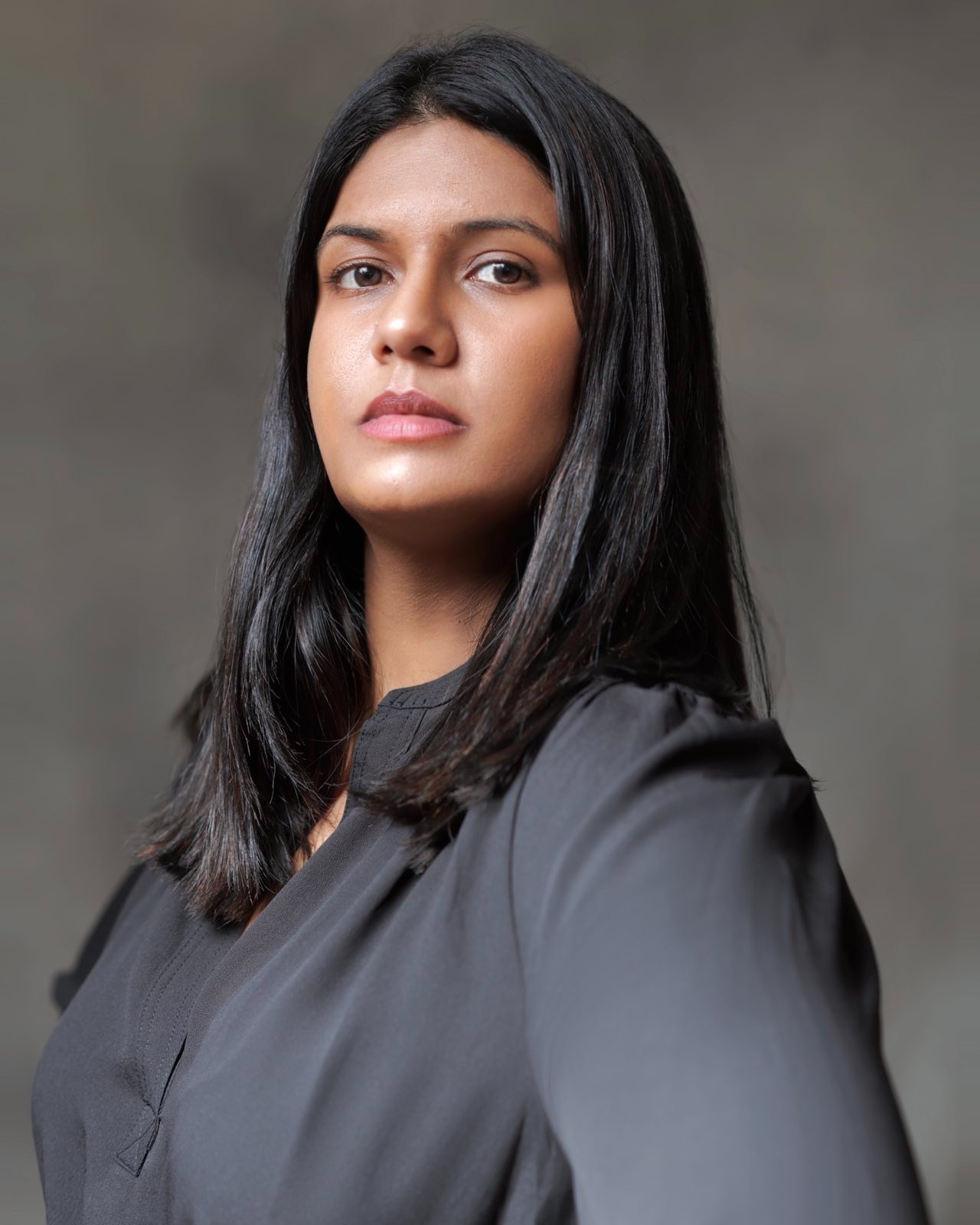
Gonsalves in 2022

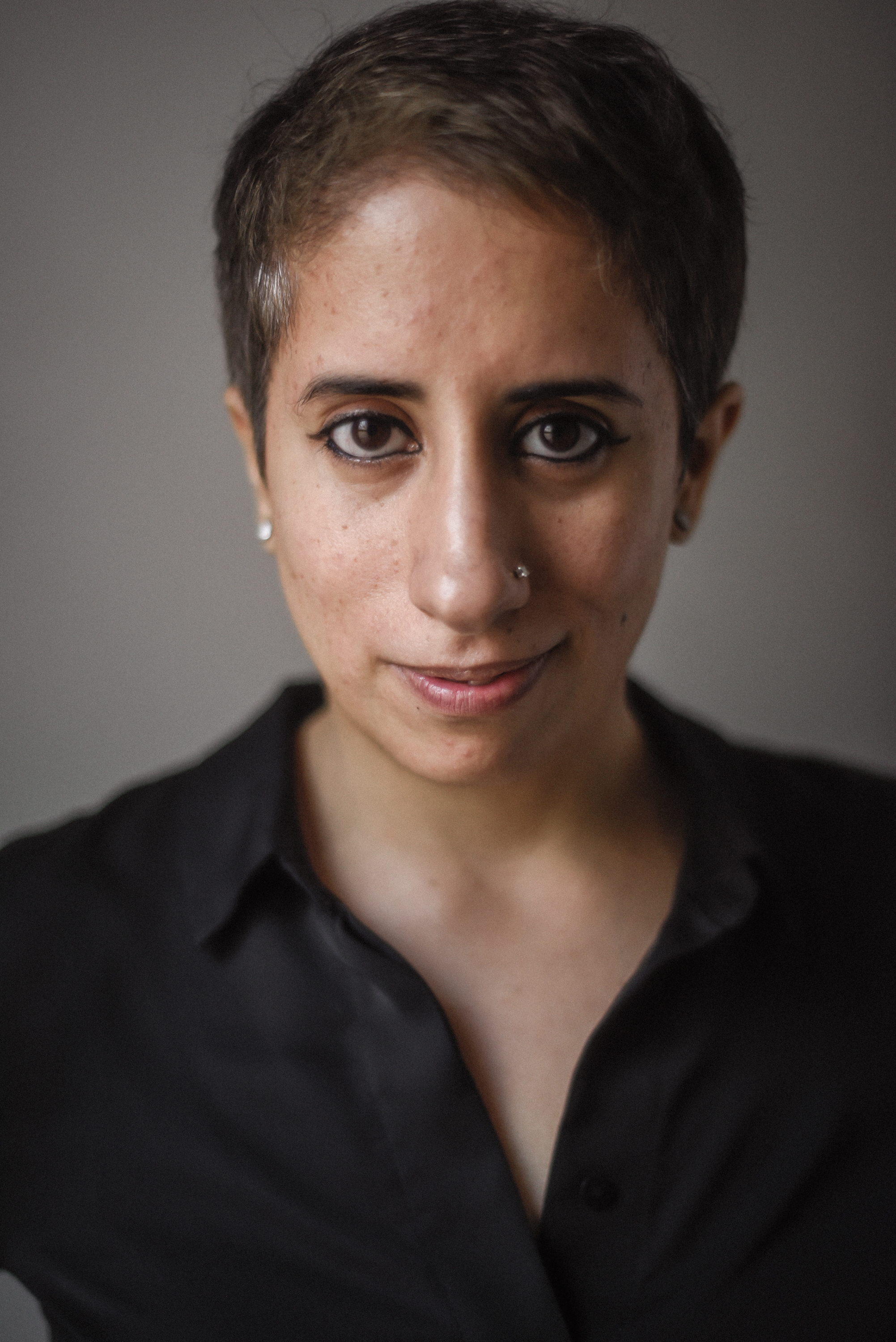
Monga in 2018

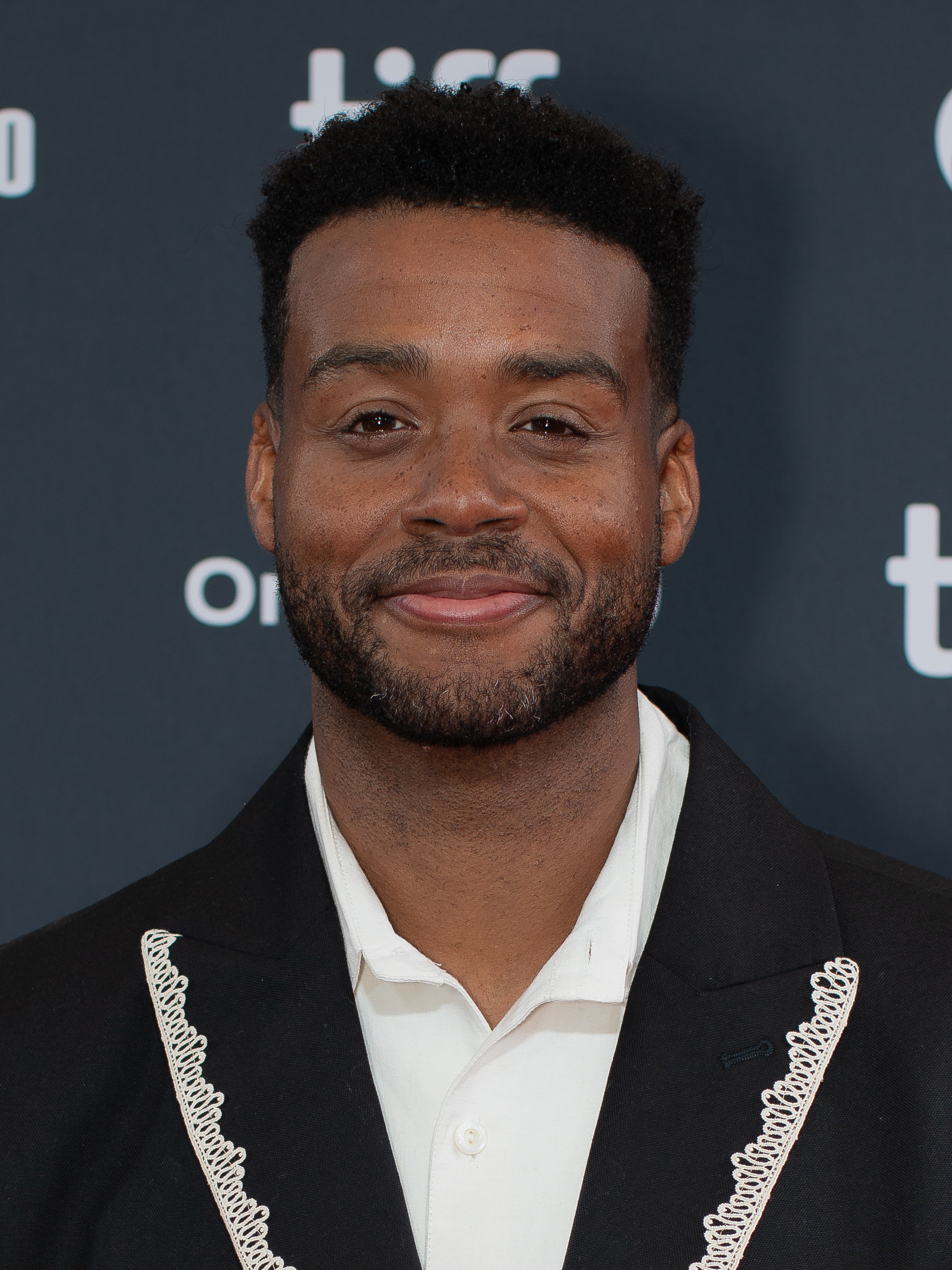
Bowers in 2024

Documentary Short Film
Year	Name	Born	Film	Result	Notes
2013 (86th)	Sara Ishaq	1984	Karama Has No Walls	Nominated	
2014 (87th)	Gabriel Serra Arguello	July 5, 1984	Our Curse	Nominated	
2014 (87th)	Tomasz Śliwiński	November 4, 1982	The Reaper (La Parka)	Nominated	
2015 (88th)	Adam Benzine	May 29, 1982	Claude Lanzmann: Spectres of the Shoah	Nominated	
2015 (88th)	Jerry Franck	April 16, 1986	Chau, Beyond the Lines	Nominated	
2017 (90th)	Elaine McMillion Sheldon	1988	Heroin(e)	Nominated	
2018 (91st)	Rayka Zehtabchi	1994	Period. End of Sentence.	Won	
2020 (93rd)	Sophia Nahli Allison	1987	A Love Song for Latasha	Nominated	
2020 (93rd)	Kris Bowers Ben Proudfoot	April 5, 1989 October 29, 1990	A Concerto Is a Conversation	Nominated	
2021 (94th)	Ben Proudfoot	October 29, 1990	The Queen of Basketball	Won	
2022 (95th)	Evgenia Arbugaeva Maxim Arbugaev	February 16, 1985 August 3, 1991	Haulout	Nominated	
2022 (95th)	Kartiki Gonsalves Guneet Monga	November 2, 1986 November 21, 1983	The Elephant Whisperers	Won	
2023 (96th)	Kris Bowers Ben Proudfoot	April 5, 1989 October 29, 1990	The Last Repair Shop	Won	
2023 (96th)	Christine Turner	1994/1995	The Barber of Little Rock	Nominated	
2023 (96th)	Sean Wang	1982	Nǎi Nai & Wài Pó	Nominated	
2024 (97th)	Ema Ryan Yamazaki Eric Nyari	1989 October 20, 1981	Instruments of a Beating Heart	Nominated	

== Performance ==
=== Best Actor ===
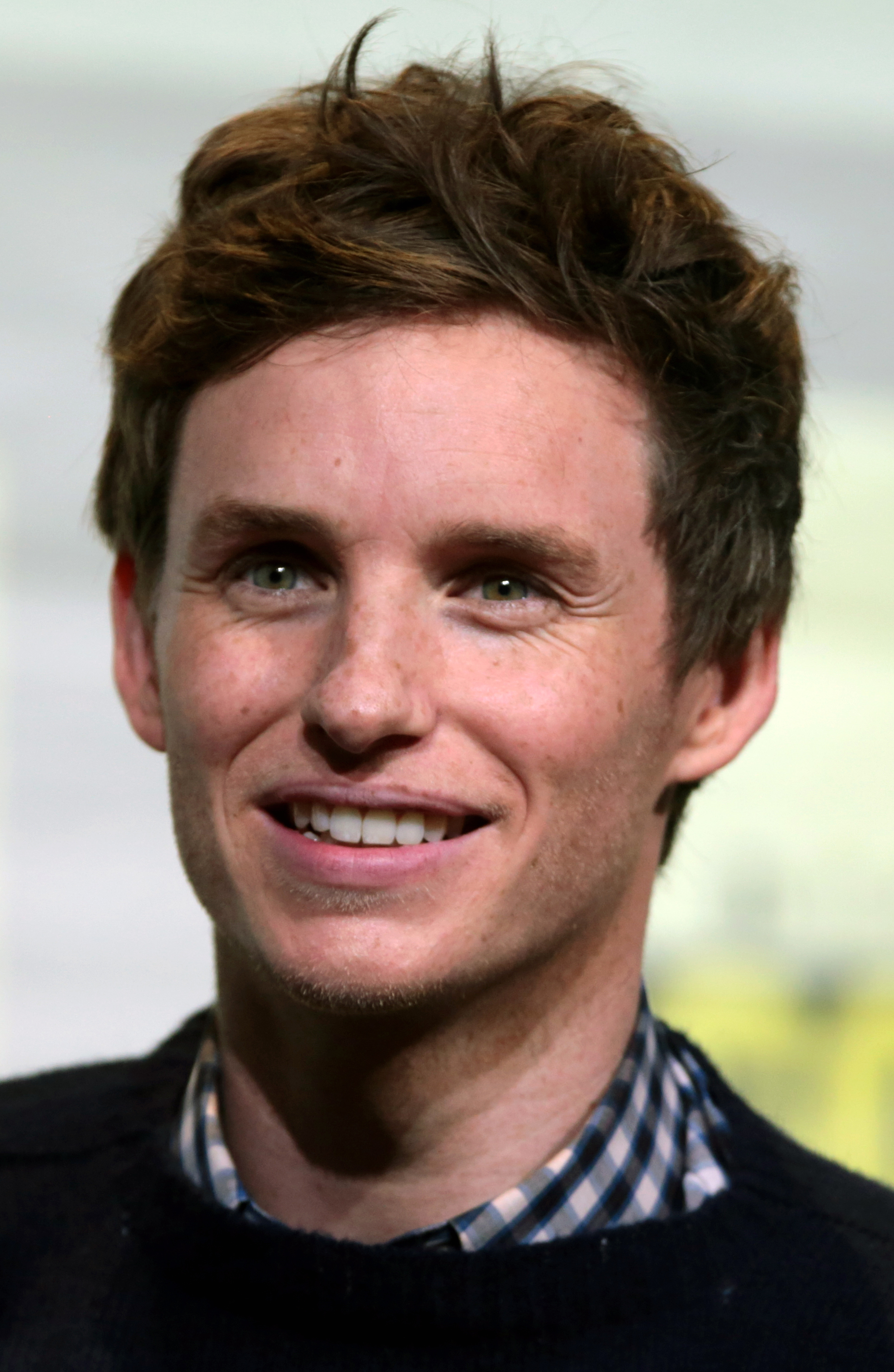
Redmayne in 2016

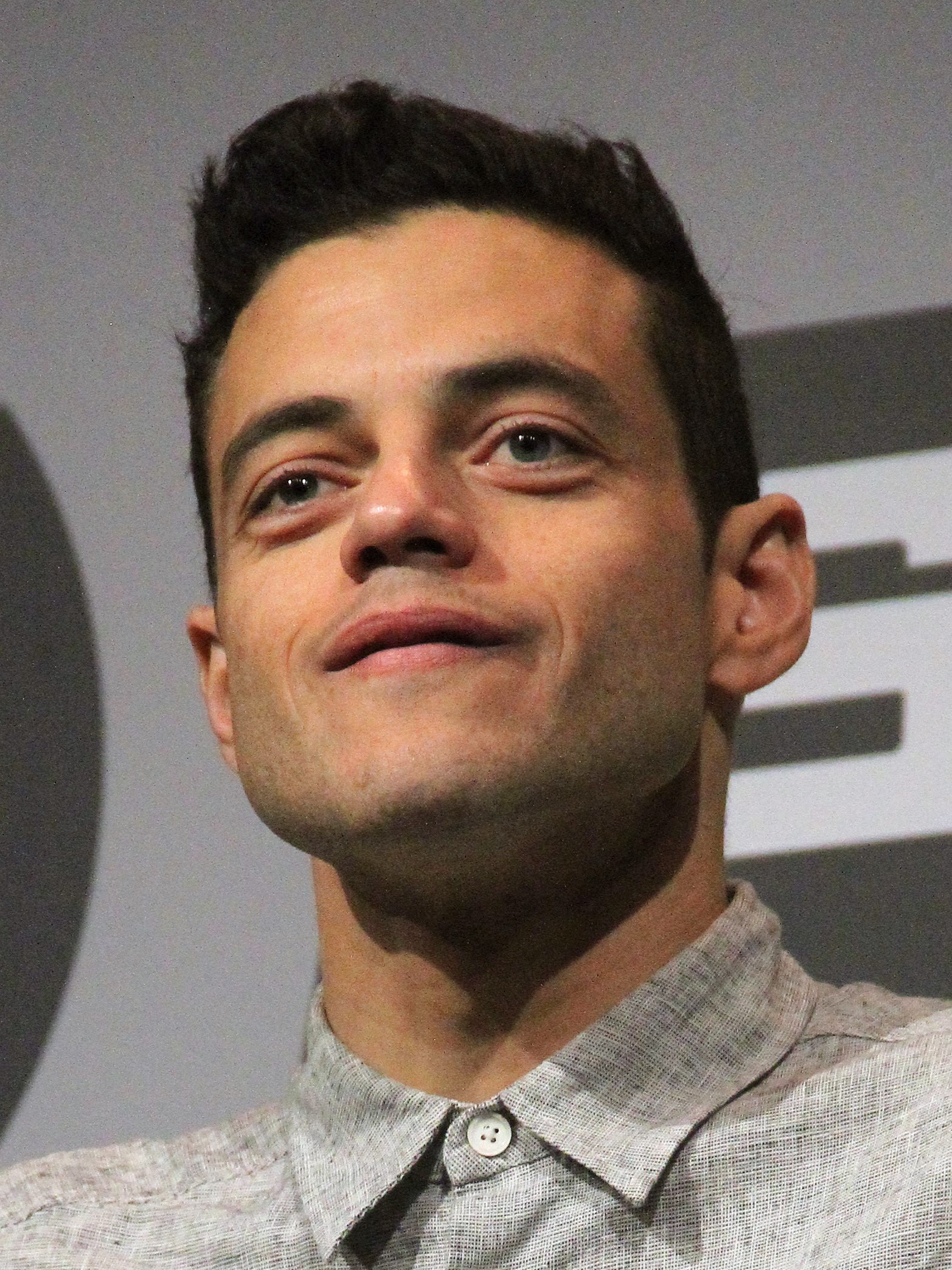
Malek in 2016

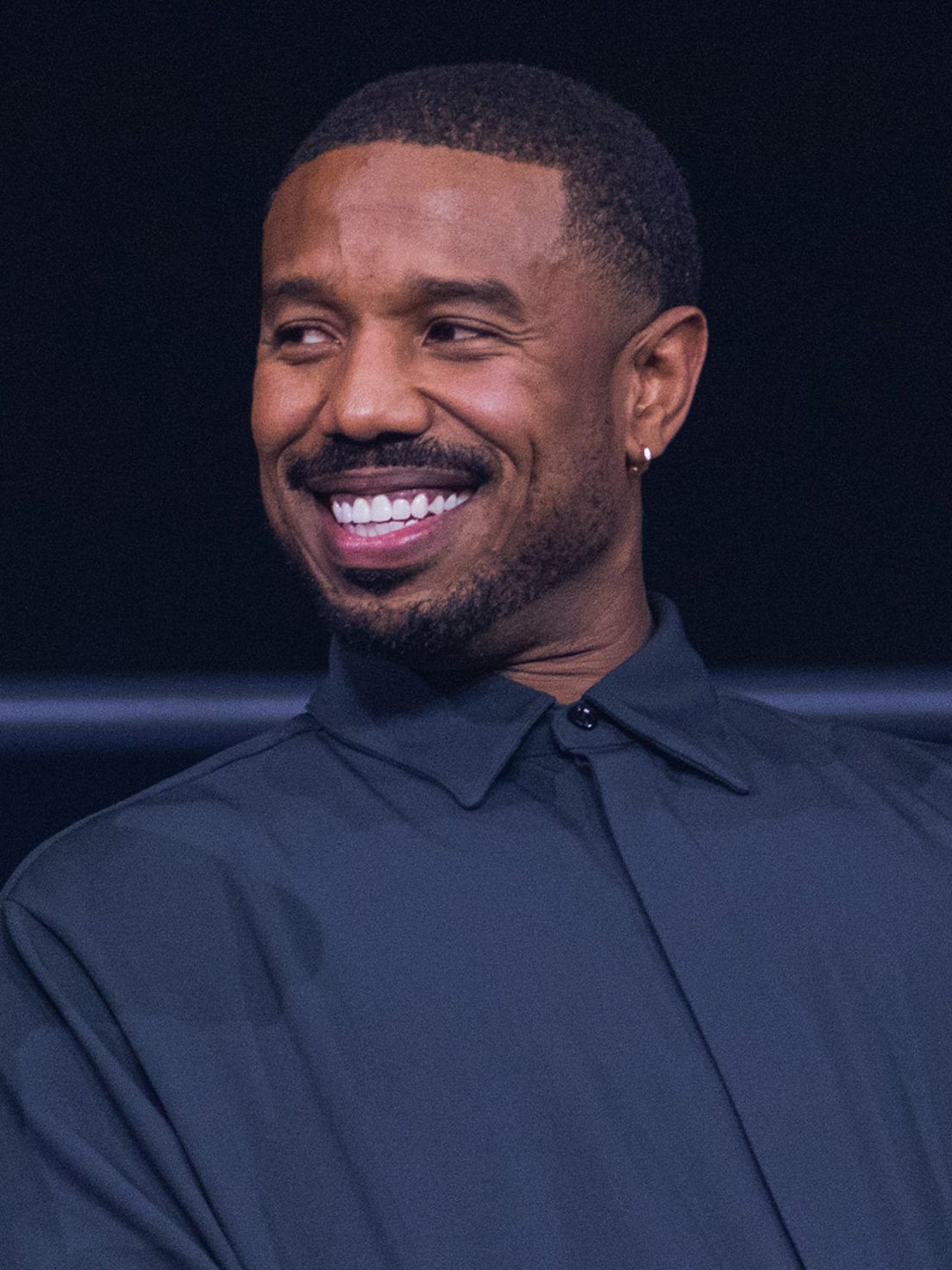
Jordan in 2025

Actor in a Leading Role
Year	Name	Born	Film	Result	Notes
2010 (83rd)	Jesse Eisenberg	October 5, 1983	The Social Network	Nominated	
2014 (87th)	Eddie Redmayne	January 6, 1982	The Theory of Everything	Won	
2015 (88th)	Eddie Redmayne	January 6, 1982	The Danish Girl	Nominated	
2016 (89th)	Andrew Garfield	August 20, 1983	Hacksaw Ridge	Nominated	
2017 (90th)	Timothée Chalamet	December 27, 1995	Call Me by Your Name	Nominated	Chalamet became the third-youngest Best Actor nominee at age 22.
2017 (90th)	Daniel Kaluuya	February 24, 1989	Get Out	Nominated	
2018 (91st)	Rami Malek	May 12, 1981	Bohemian Rhapsody	Won	
2019 (92nd)	Adam Driver	November 19, 1983	Marriage Story	Nominated	
2020 (93rd)	Riz Ahmed	December 1, 1982	Sound of Metal	Nominated	
2020 (93rd)	Steven Yeun	August 20, 1983	Minari	Nominated	
2021 (94th)	Andrew Garfield	August 20, 1983	Tick, Tick... Boom!	Nominated	
2022 (95th)	Austin Butler	August 17, 1991	Elvis	Nominated	
2022 (95th)	Paul Mescal	February 2, 1996	Aftersun	Nominated	
2024 (97th)	Timothée Chalamet	December 27, 1995	A Complete Unknown	Nominated	Chalamet became the youngest two-time nominee for Best Actor since James Dean.
2024 (97th)	Sebastian Stan	August 13, 1982	The Apprentice	Nominated	
2025 (98th)	Timothée Chalamet	December 27, 1995	Marty Supreme	Nominated	Chalamet became the youngest three-time nominee for Best Actor since Marlon Brando.
2025 (98th)	Michael B. Jordan	February 9, 1987	Sinners	Won	

=== Best Actress ===
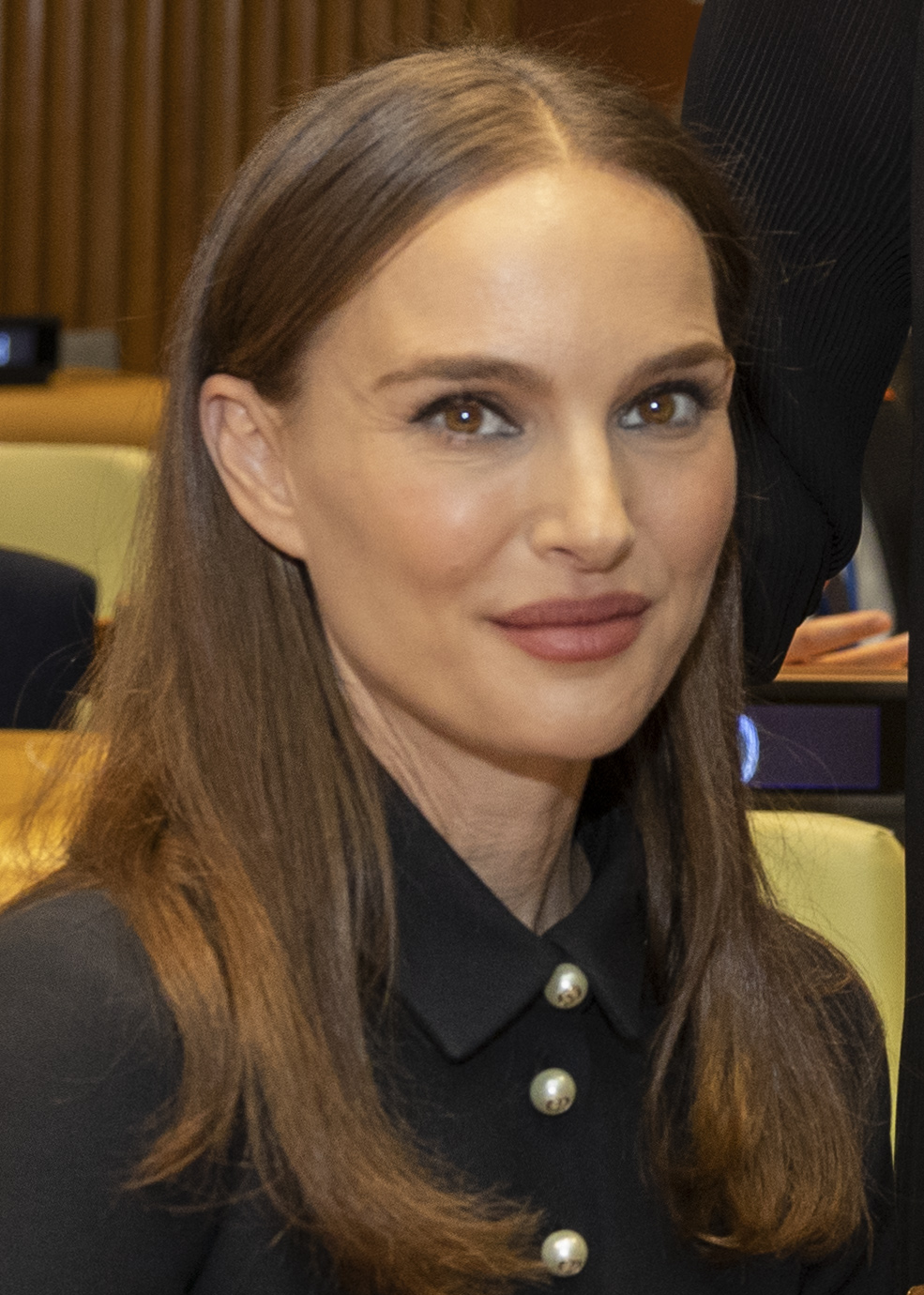
Portman in 2023

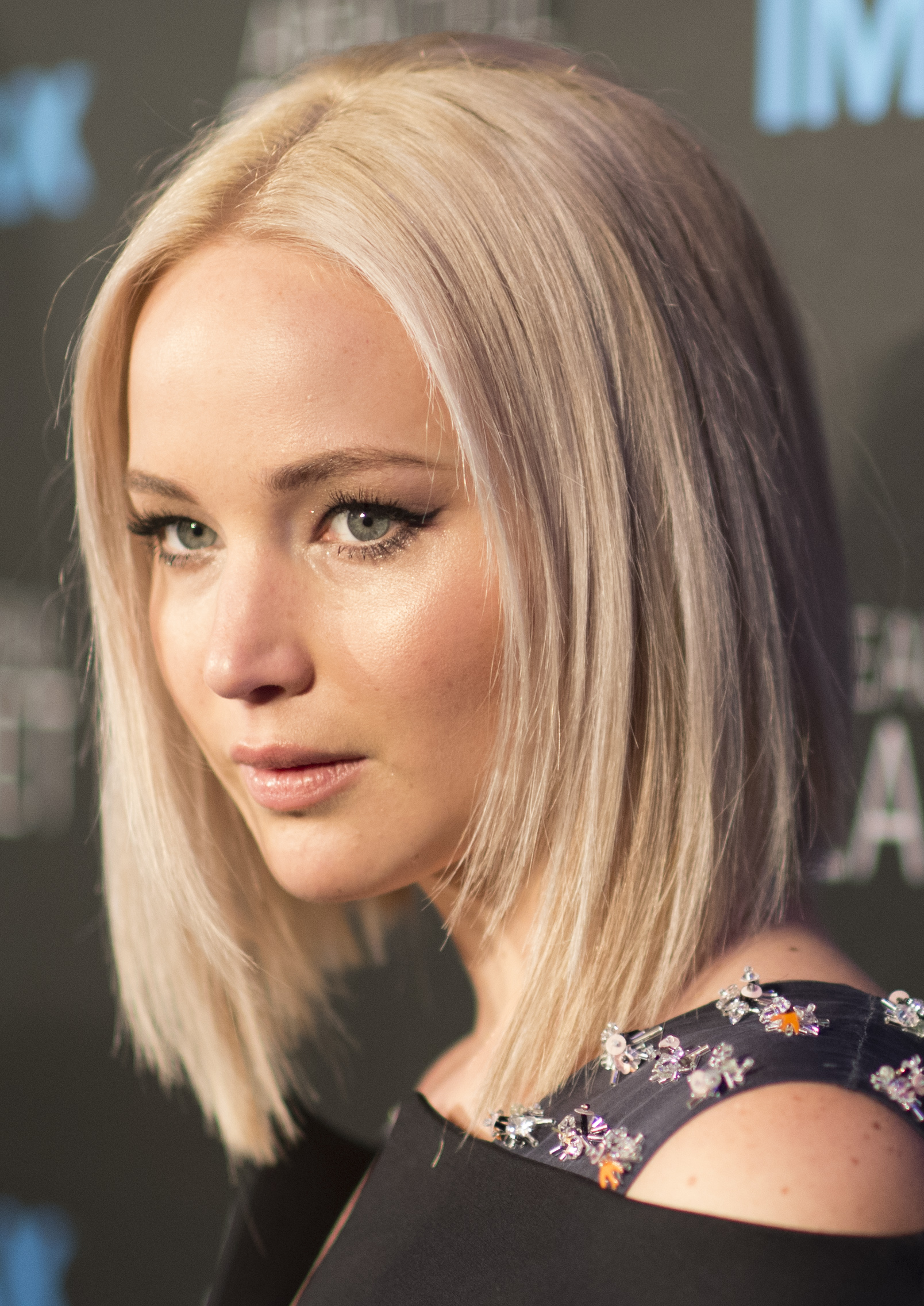
Lawrence in 2016

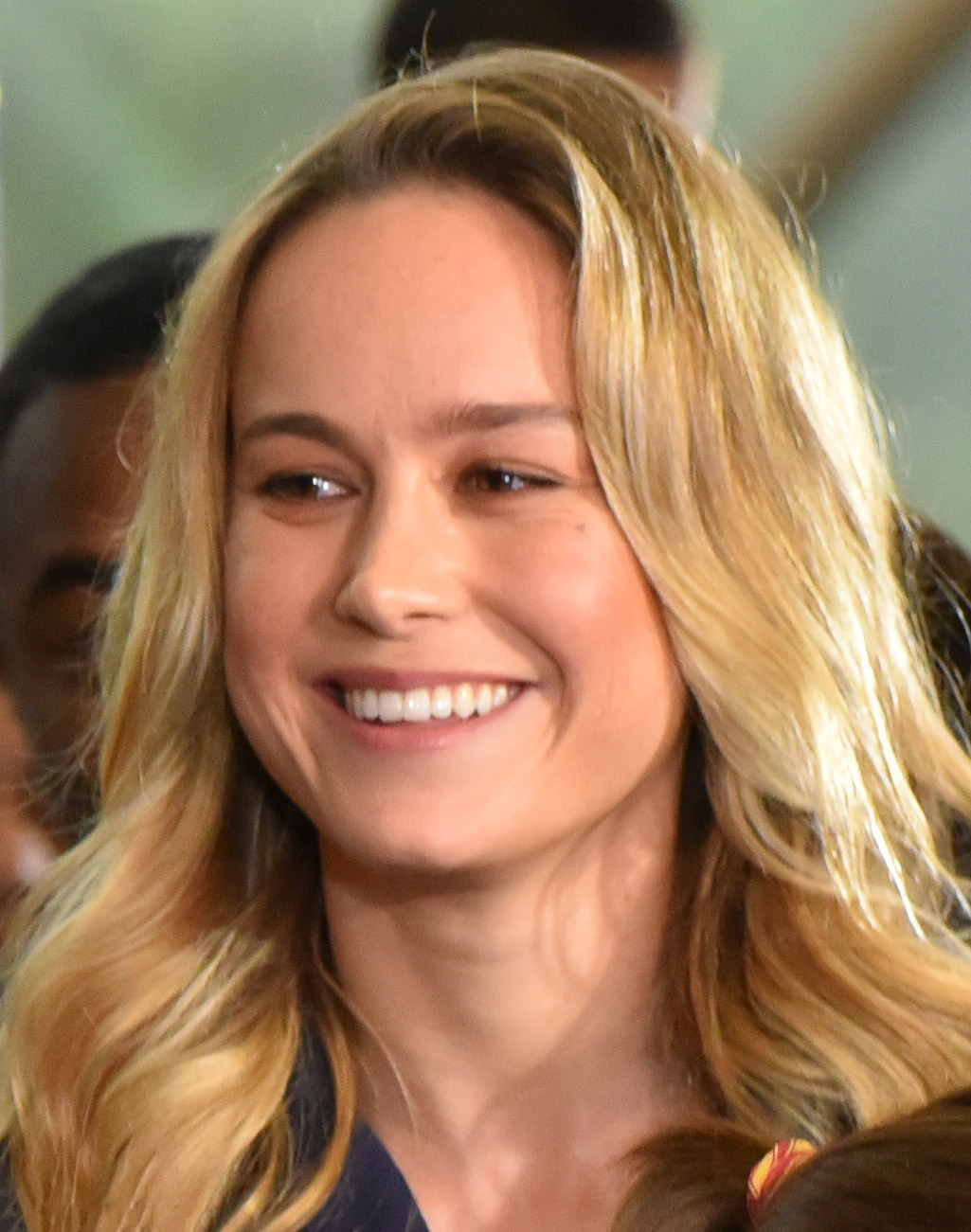
Larson in 2018

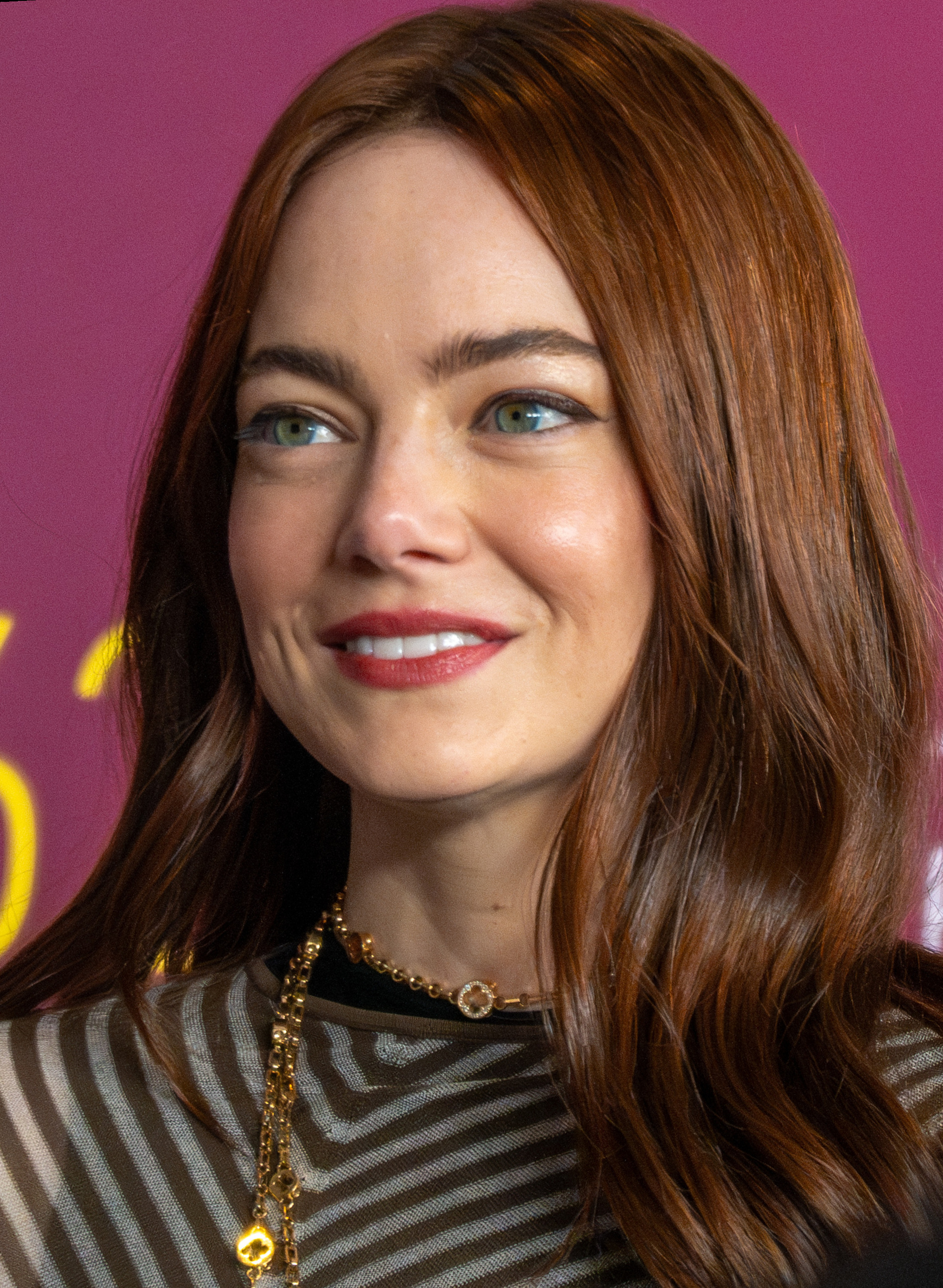
Stone in 2024

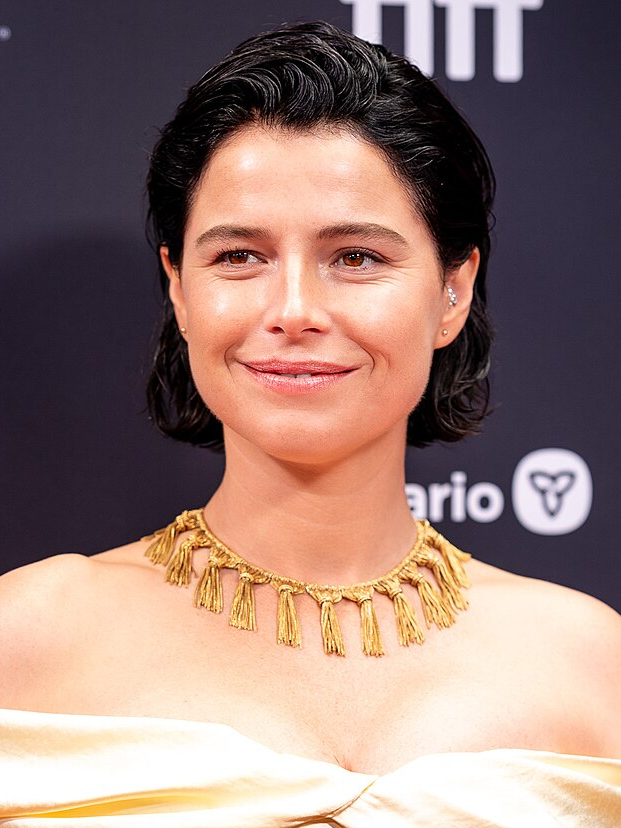
Buckley in 2025

Actress in a Leading Role
Year	Name	Born	Film	Result	Notes
2003 (76th)	Keisha Castle-Hughes	March 24, 1990	Whale Rider	Nominated	
2004 (77th)	Catalina Sandino Moreno	April 19, 1981	Maria Full of Grace	Nominated	
2005 (78th)	Keira Knightley	March 26, 1985	Pride & Prejudice	Nominated	
2007 (80th)	Elliot Page^{[D]}	February 21, 1987	Juno	Nominated	
2008 (81st)	Anne Hathaway	November 12, 1982	Rachel Getting Married	Nominated	
2009 (82nd)	Carey Mulligan	May 28, 1985	An Education	Nominated	
2009 (82nd)	Gabourey Sidibe	May 6, 1983	Precious	Nominated	
2010 (83rd)	Natalie Portman	June 9, 1981	Black Swan	Won	
2010 (83rd)	Jennifer Lawrence	August 15, 1990	Winter's Bone	Nominated	
2011 (84th)	Rooney Mara	April 17, 1985	The Girl with the Dragon Tattoo	Nominated	
2012 (85th)	Jennifer Lawrence	August 15, 1990	Silver Linings Playbook	Won	Lawrence is the second-youngest actress to win in that category.
2014 (87th)	Felicity Jones	October 17, 1983	The Theory of Everything	Nominated	
2015 (88th)	Brie Larson	October 1, 1989	Room	Won	
2015 (88th)	Jennifer Lawrence	August 15, 1990	Joy	Nominated	
2015 (88th)	Saoirse Ronan	April 12, 1994	Brooklyn	Nominated	
2016 (89th)	Ruth Negga	May 4, 1981	Loving	Nominated	
2016 (89th)	Natalie Portman	June 9, 1981	Jackie	Nominated	
2016 (89th)	Emma Stone	November 6, 1988	La La Land	Won	
2017 (90th)	Margot Robbie	July 2, 1990	I, Tonya	Nominated	
2017 (90th)	Saoirse Ronan	April 12, 1994	Lady Bird	Nominated	
2018 (91st)	Yalitza Aparicio	December 11, 1993	Roma	Nominated	
2018 (91st)	Lady Gaga	March 28, 1986	A Star Is Born	Nominated	
2019 (92nd)	Cynthia Erivo	January 8, 1987	Harriet	Nominated	
2019 (92nd)	Scarlett Johansson	November 22, 1984	Marriage Story	Nominated	
2019 (92nd)	Saoirse Ronan	April 12, 1994	Little Women	Nominated	
2020 (93rd)	Andra Day	December 30, 1984	The United States vs. Billie Holiday	Nominated	
2020 (93rd)	Vanessa Kirby	April 18, 1988	Pieces of a Woman	Nominated	
2020 (93rd)	Carey Mulligan	May 28, 1985	Promising Young Woman	Nominated	
2021 (94th)	Kristen Stewart	April 9, 1990	Spencer	Nominated	
2022 (95th)	Ana de Armas	April 30, 1988	Blonde	Nominated	
2022 (95th)	Andrea Riseborough	November 20, 1981	To Leslie	Nominated	
2023 (96th)	Lily Gladstone	August 2, 1986	Killers of the Flower Moon	Nominated	
2023 (96th)	Carey Mulligan	May 28, 1985	Maestro	Nominated	
2023 (96th)	Emma Stone	November 6, 1988	Poor Things	Won	
2024 (97th)	Cynthia Erivo	January 8, 1987	Wicked	Nominated	
2025 (98th)	Jessie Buckley	December 28, 1989	Hamnet	Won	
2025 (98th)	Renate Reinsve	November 24, 1987	Sentimental Value	Nominated	
2025 (98th)	Emma Stone	November 6, 1988	Bugonia	Nominated	

=== Best Supporting Actor ===
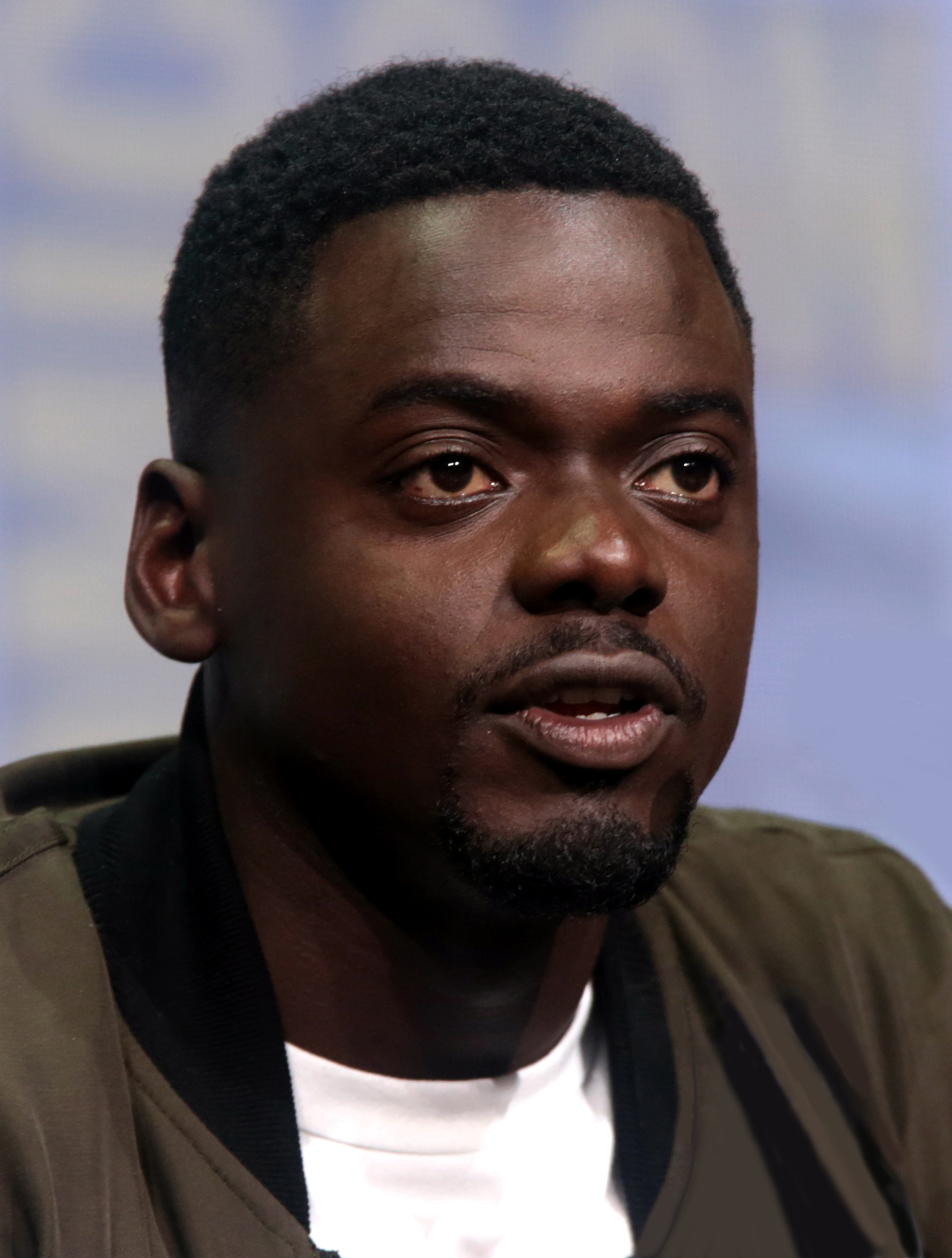
Kaluuya in 2017

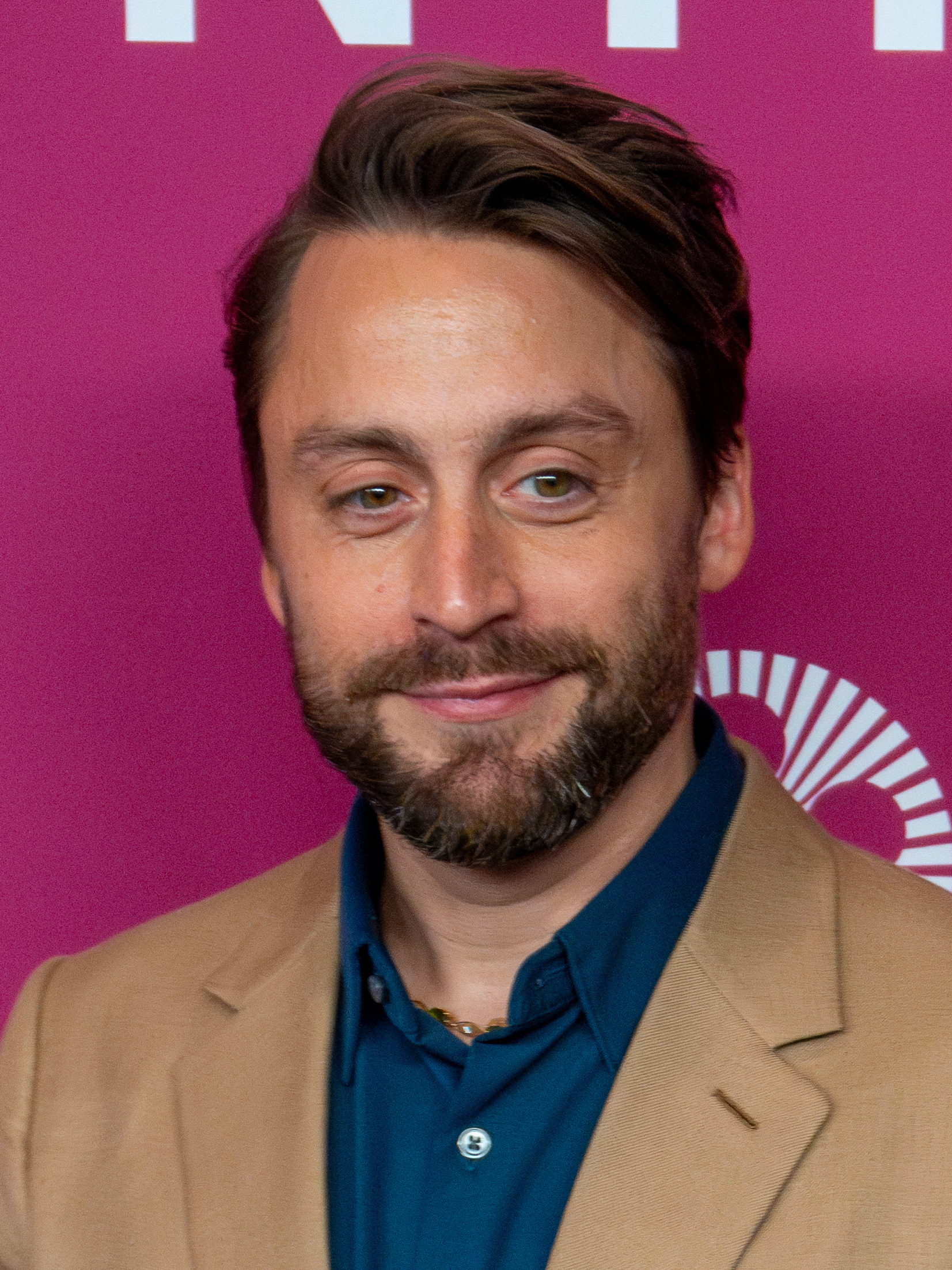
Culkin in 2024

Actor in a Supporting Role
Year	Name	Born	Film	Result	Notes
1999 (72nd)	Haley Joel Osment	April 10, 1988	The Sixth Sense	Nominated	
2011 (84th)	Jonah Hill	December 20, 1983	Moneyball	Nominated	
2013 (86th)	Barkhad Abdi	April 10, 1985	Captain Phillips	Nominated	
2013 (86th)	Jonah Hill	December 20, 1983	The Wolf of Wall Street	Nominated	
2016 (89th)	Lucas Hedges	December 12, 1996	Manchester by the Sea	Nominated	
2016 (89th)	Dev Patel	April 23, 1990	Lion	Nominated	
2018 (91st)	Adam Driver	November 19, 1983	BlacKkKlansman	Nominated	
2020 (93rd)	Daniel Kaluuya	February 24, 1989	Judas and the Black Messiah	Won	
2020 (93rd)	LaKeith Stanfield	August 12, 1991	Judas and the Black Messiah	Nominated	
2020 (93rd)	Leslie Odom Jr.	August 6, 1981	One Night in Miami...	Nominated	
2021 (94th)	Jesse Plemons	April 2, 1988	The Power of the Dog	Nominated	
2021 (94th)	Kodi Smit-McPhee	June 13, 1996	The Power of the Dog	Nominated	
2022 (95th)	Brian Tyree Henry	November 20, 1982	Causeway	Nominated	
2022 (95th)	Barry Keoghan	October 18, 1992	The Banshees of Inisherin	Nominated	
2024 (97th)	Yura Borisov	December 8, 1992	Anora	Nominated	Borisov is the first Russian to be nominated in that category after four decades.
2024 (97th)	Kieran Culkin	September 30, 1982	A Real Pain	Won	

=== Best Supporting Actress ===
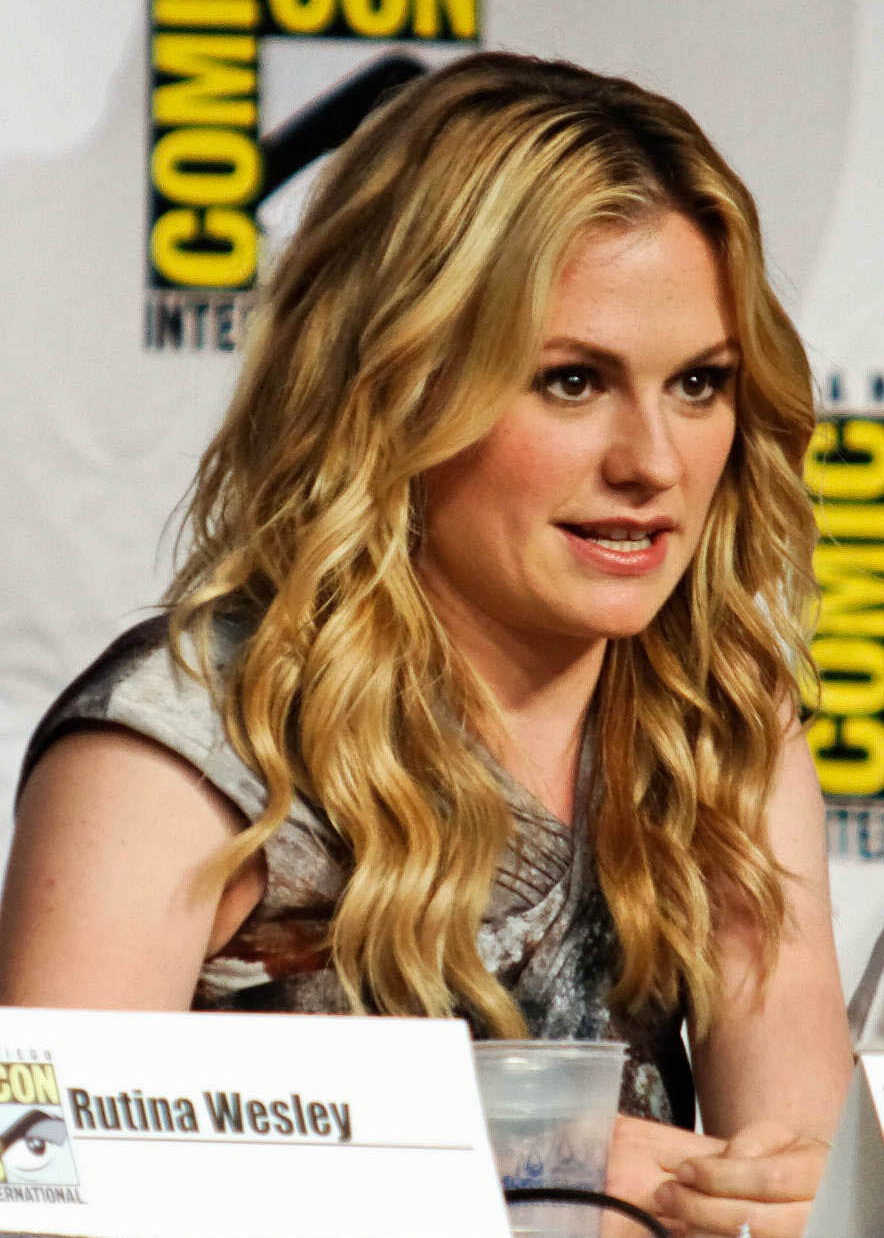
Paquin in 2010

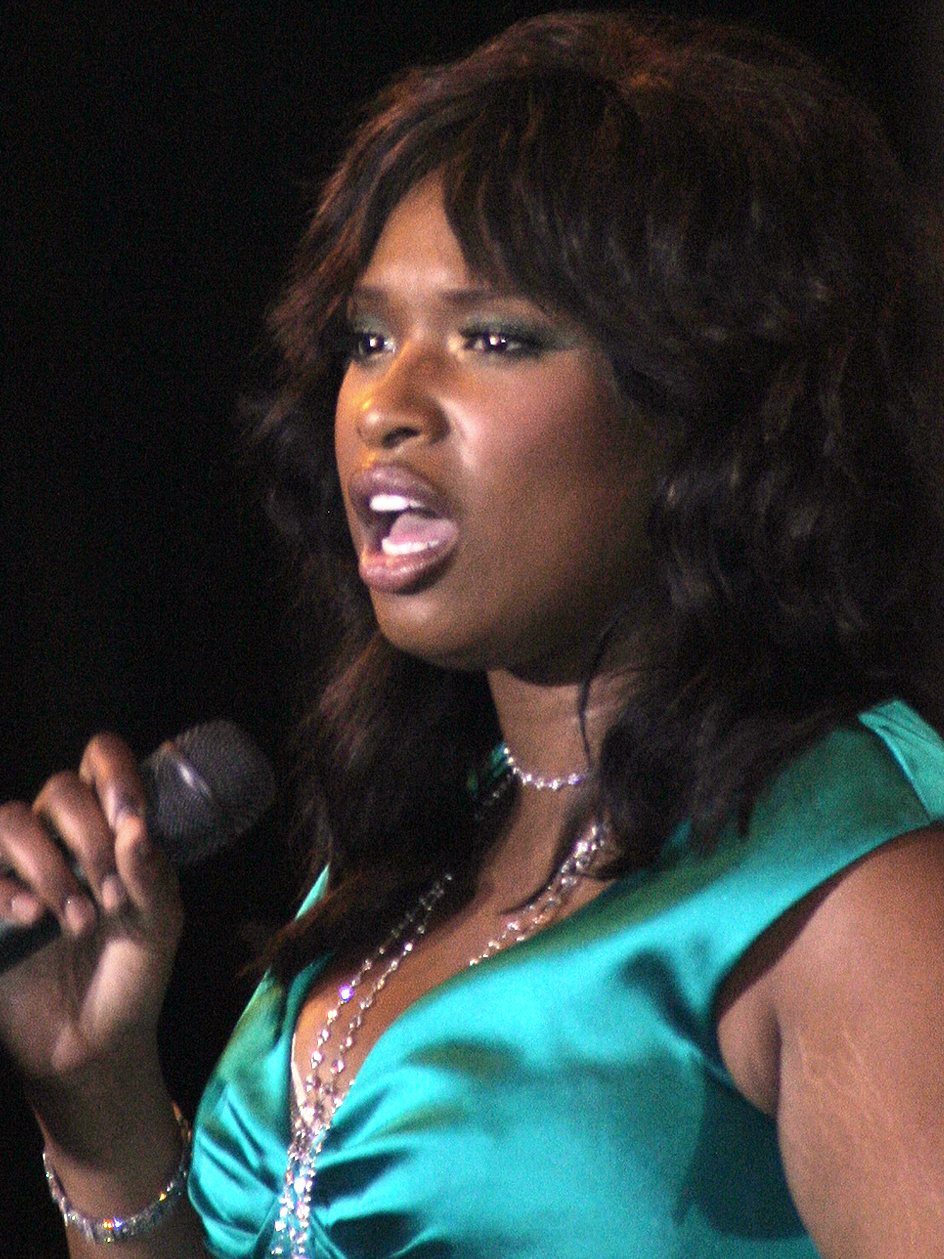
Hudson in 2007

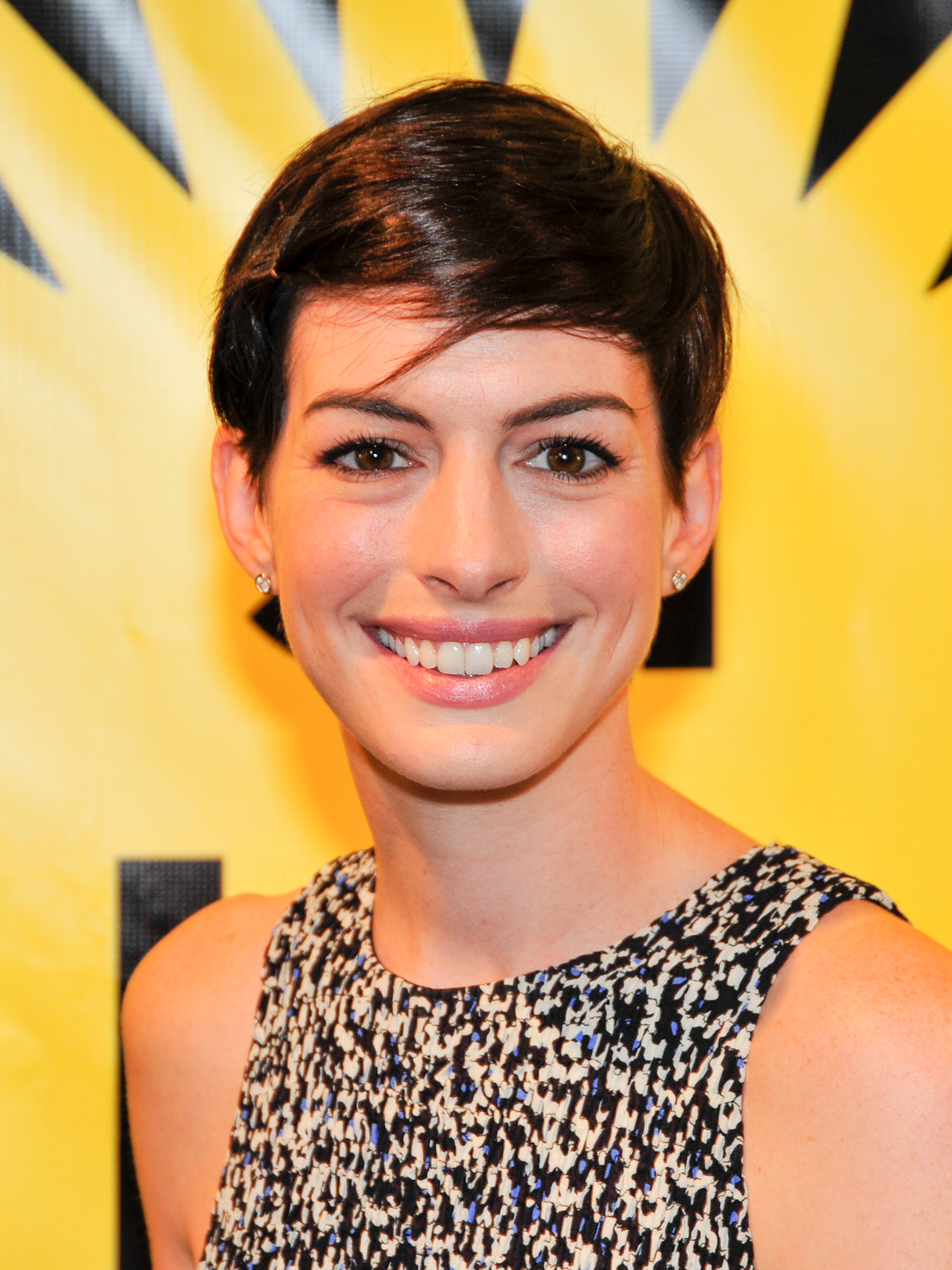
Hathaway in 2014

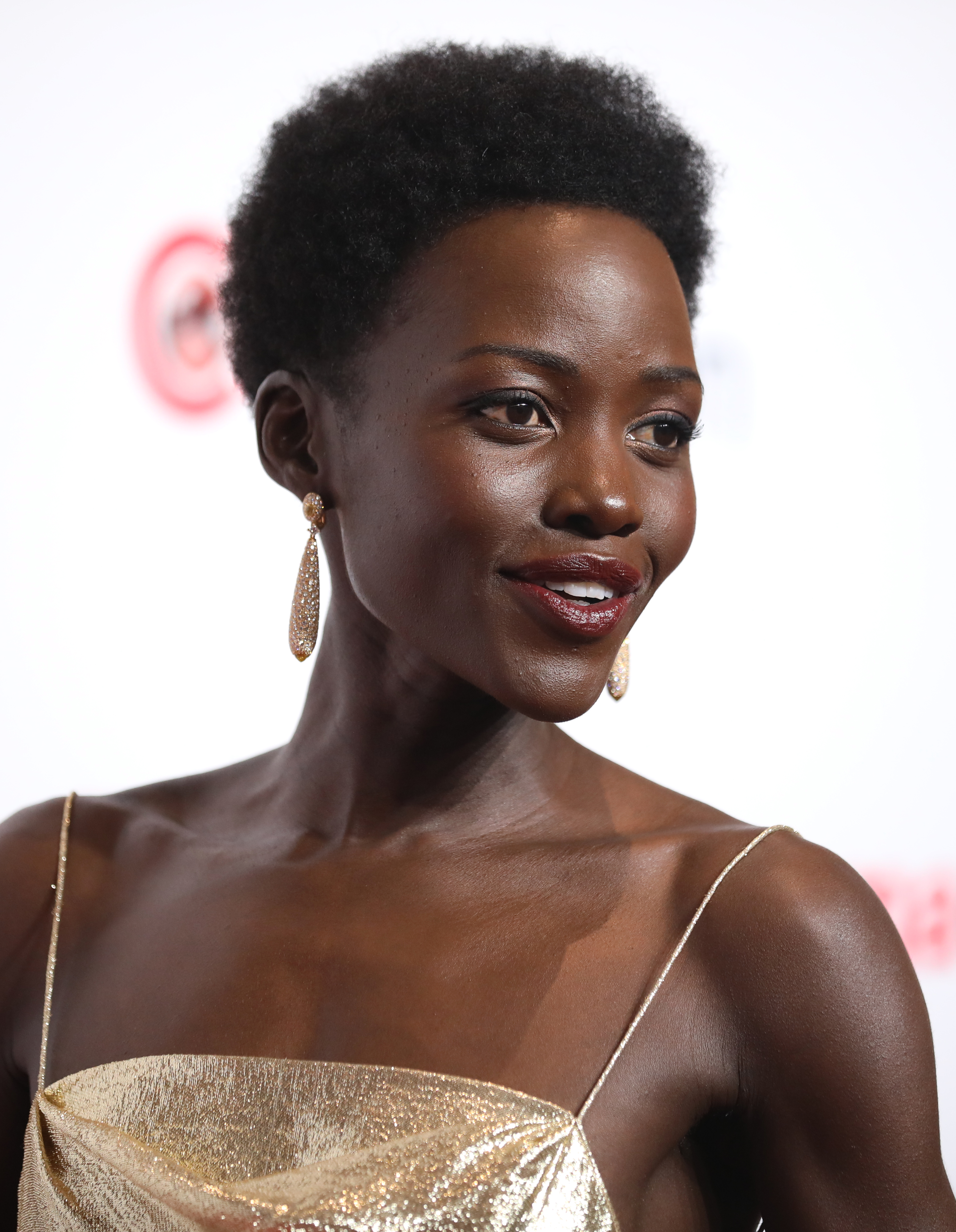
Nyong'o in 2024

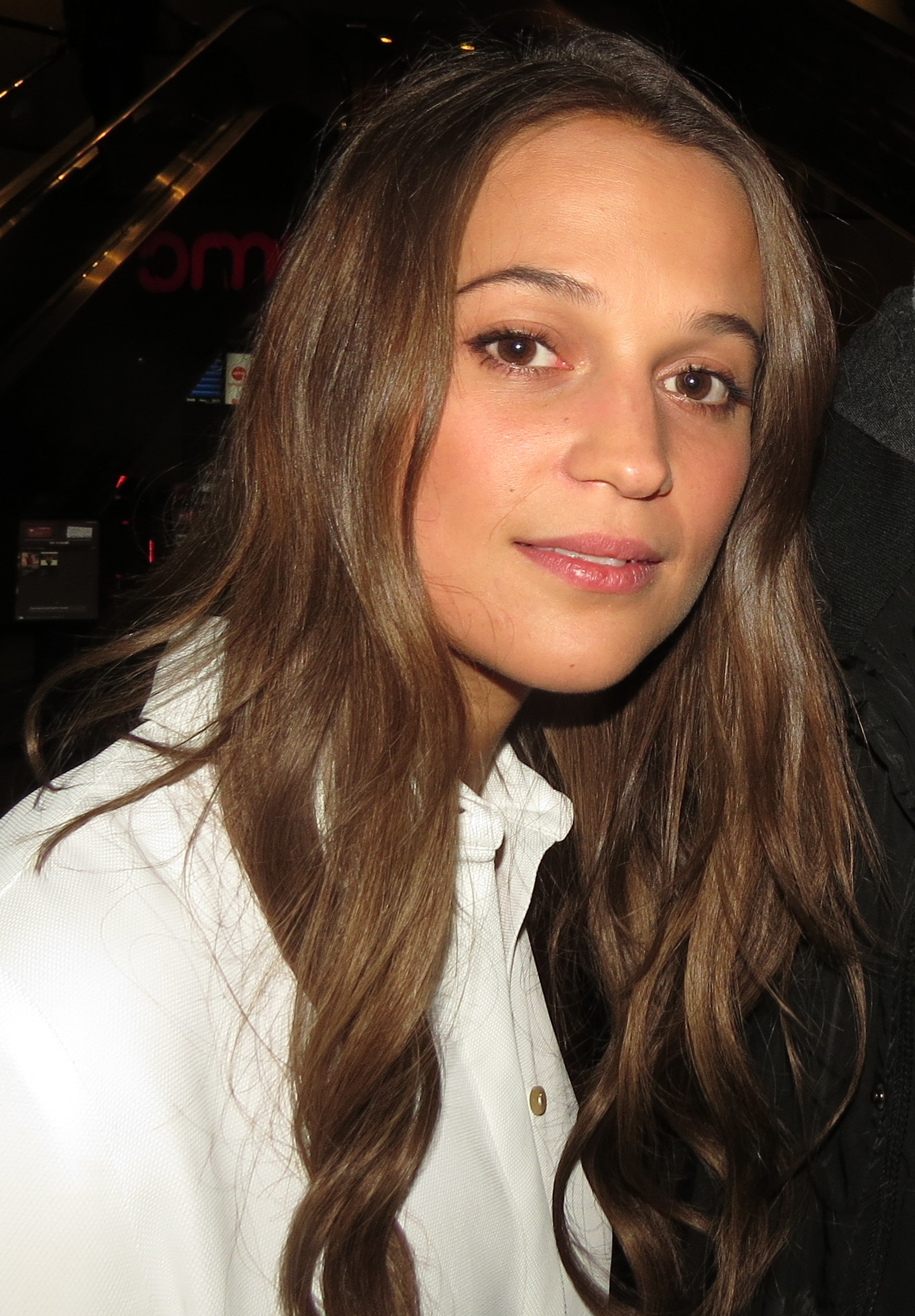
Vikander in 2015

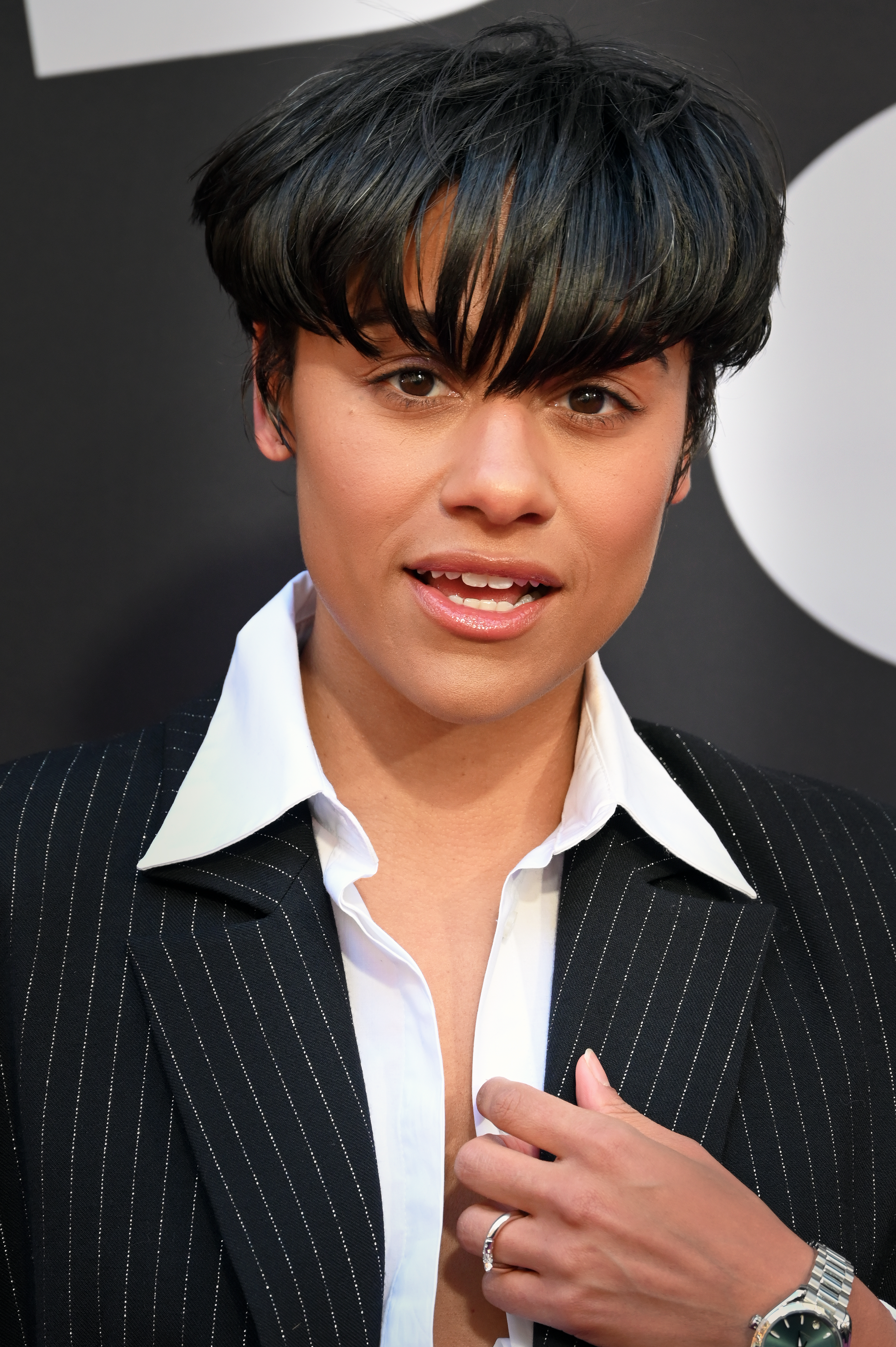
DeBose in 2025

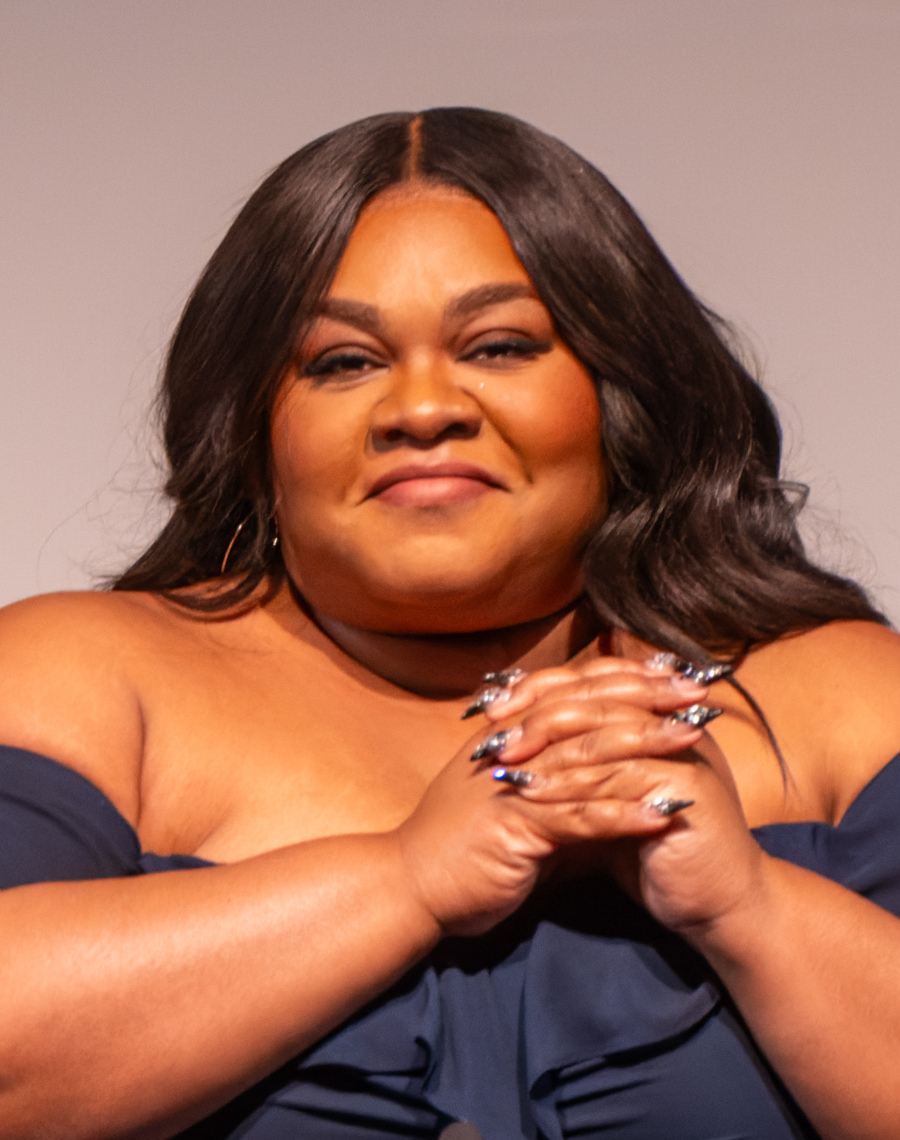
Randolph in 2024

Actress in a Supporting Role
Year	Name	Born	Film	Result	Notes
1993 (66th)	Anna Paquin	July 24, 1982	The Piano	Won	Paquin is the first Millennial member to be nominated and win an Academy Award.
2004 (77th)	Natalie Portman	June 9, 1981	Closer	Nominated	
2006 (79th)	Abigail Breslin	April 14, 1996	Little Miss Sunshine	Nominated	
2006 (79th)	Jennifer Hudson	September 12, 1981	Dreamgirls	Won	
2006 (79th)	Rinko Kikuchi	January 6, 1981	Babel	Nominated	
2007 (80th)	Saoirse Ronan	April 12, 1994	Atonement	Nominated	
2009 (82nd)	Anna Kendrick	August 9, 1985	Up in the Air	Nominated	
2010 (83rd)	Hailee Steinfeld	December 11, 1996	True Grit	Nominated	
2012 (85th)	Anne Hathaway	November 12, 1982	Les Misérables	Won	
2013 (86th)	Jennifer Lawrence	August 15, 1990	American Hustle	Nominated	
2013 (86th)	Lupita Nyong'o	March 1, 1983	12 Years a Slave	Won	
2014 (87th)	Keira Knightley	March 26, 1985	The Imitation Game	Nominated	
2014 (87th)	Emma Stone	November 6, 1988	Birdman	Nominated	
2015 (88th)	Rooney Mara	April 17, 1985	Carol	Nominated	
2015 (88th)	Alicia Vikander	October 3, 1988	The Danish Girl	Won	
2018 (91st)	Emma Stone	November 6, 1988	The Favourite	Nominated	
2019 (92nd)	Scarlett Johansson	November 22, 1984	Jojo Rabbit	Nominated	
2019 (92nd)	Florence Pugh	January 3, 1996	Little Women	Nominated	
2019 (92nd)	Margot Robbie	July 2, 1990	Bombshell	Nominated	
2020 (93rd)	Maria Bakalova	June 4, 1996	Borat Subsequent Moviefilm	Nominated	
2020 (93rd)	Amanda Seyfried	December 3, 1985	Mank	Nominated	
2021 (94th)	Jessie Buckley	December 28, 1989	The Lost Daughter	Nominated	
2021 (94th)	Ariana DeBose	January 25, 1991	West Side Story	Won	
2021 (94th)	Kirsten Dunst	April 30, 1982	The Power of the Dog	Nominated	
2022 (95th)	Kerry Condon	January 9, 1983	The Banshees of Inisherin	Nominated	
2022 (95th)	Stephanie Hsu	November 25, 1990	Everything Everywhere All at Once	Nominated	
2023 (96th)	Emily Blunt	February 23, 1983	Oppenheimer	Nominated	
2023 (96th)	Danielle Brooks	September 17, 1989	The Color Purple	Nominated	
2023 (96th)	America Ferrera	April 18, 1984	Barbie	Nominated	
2023 (96th)	Da'Vine Joy Randolph	May 21, 1986	The Holdovers	Won	
2024 (97th)	Monica Barbaro	June 17, 1989	A Complete Unknown	Nominated	
2024 (97th)	Ariana Grande	June 26, 1993	Wicked	Nominated	
2024 (97th)	Felicity Jones	October 17, 1983	The Brutalist	Nominated	
2025 (98th)	Inga Ibsdotter Lilleaas	April 9, 1989	Sentimental Value	Nominated	
2025 (98th)	Wunmi Mosaku	July 31, 1986	Sinners	Nominated	
2025 (98th)	Teyana Taylor	December 10, 1990	One Battle After Another	Nominated	

== Directing and writing ==
=== Best Director ===
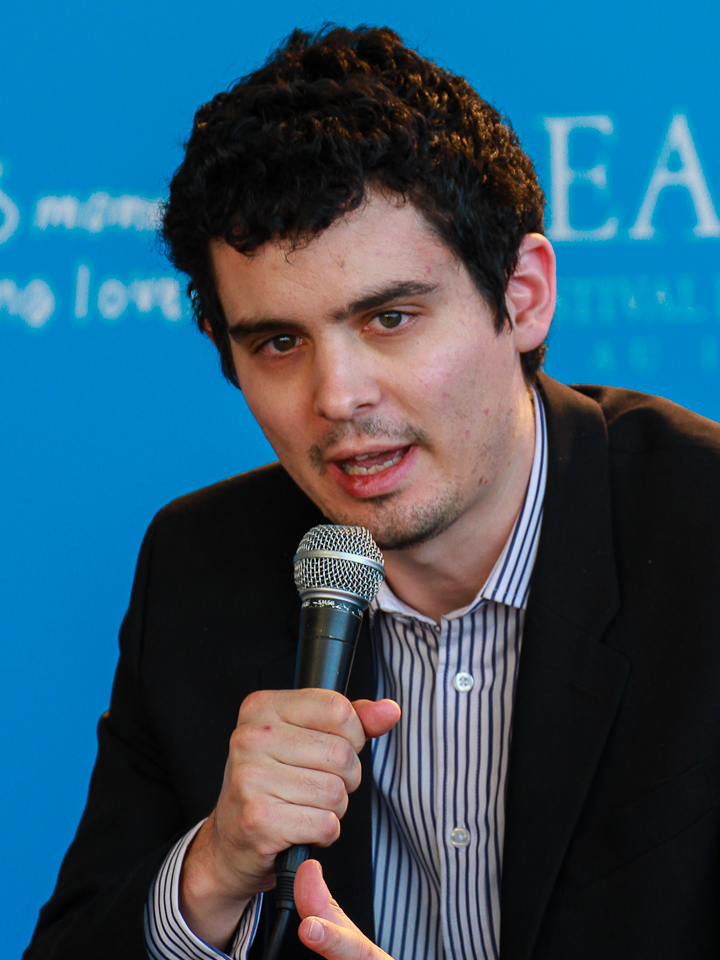
Chazelle in 2014

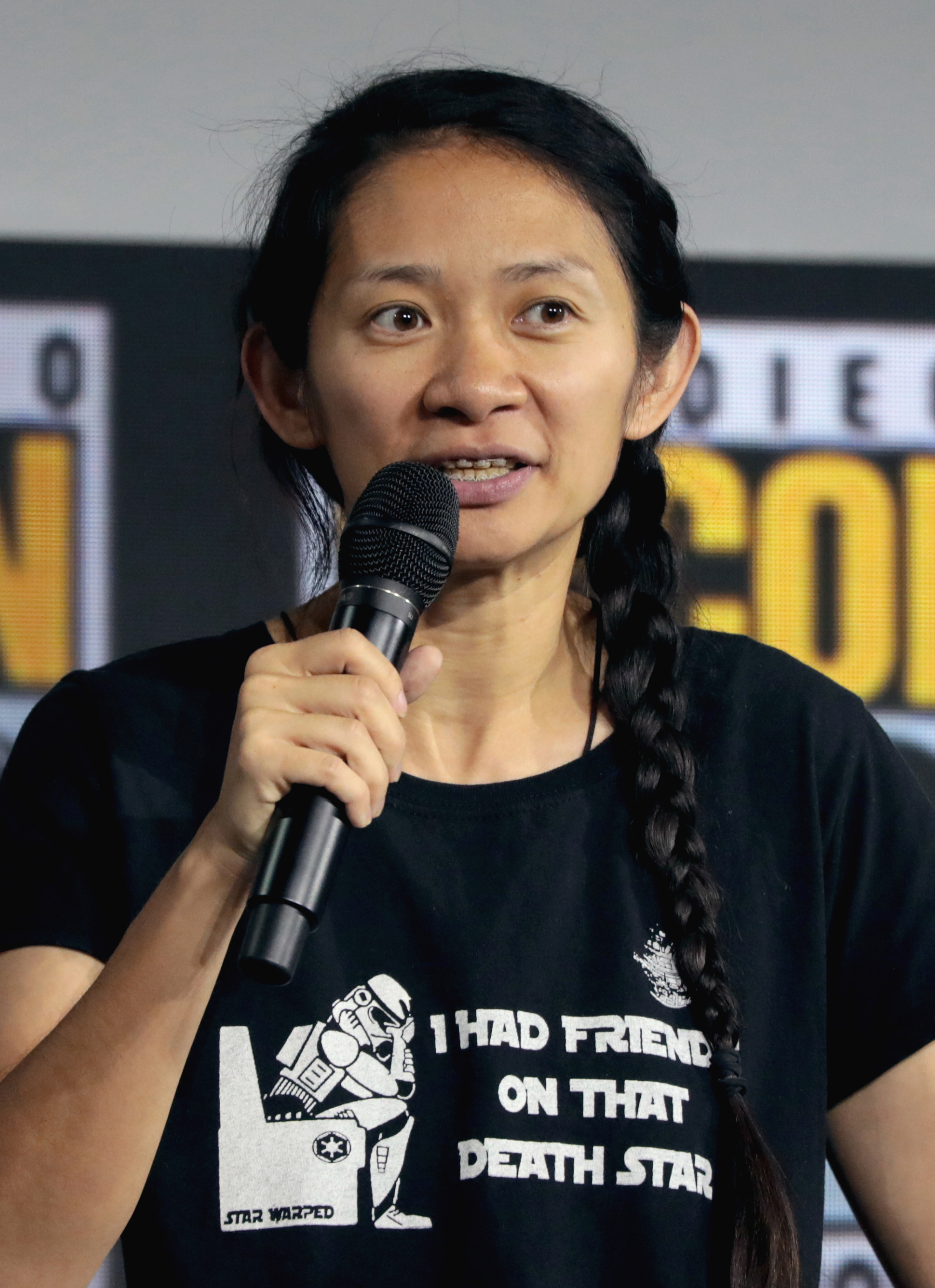
Zhao in 2019

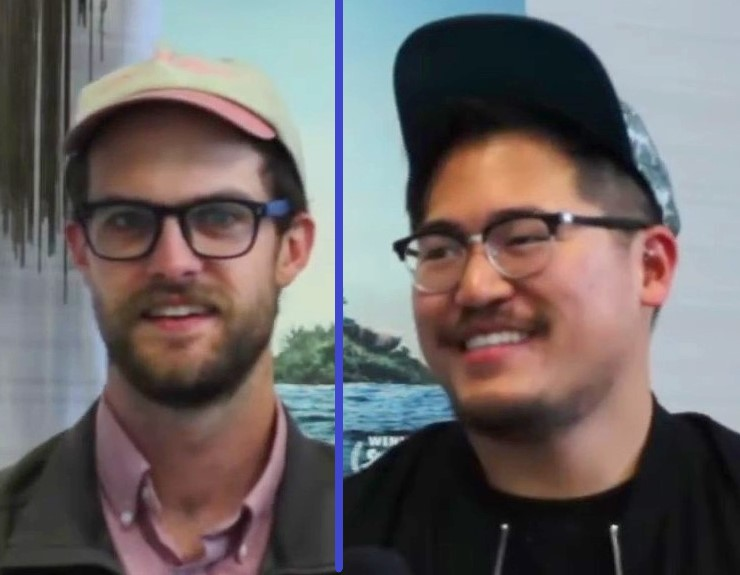
Daniels in 2016

Directing
Year	Name	Born	Film	Result	Notes
2012 (85th)	Benh Zeitlin	October 14, 1982	Beasts of the Southern Wild	Nominated	Zeitlin is the first Millennial (and seventh-youngest) to be nominated in that category.
2016 (89th)	Damien Chazelle	January 19, 1985	La La Land	Won	Chazelle became the first Millennial (and youngest) to win.
2017 (90th)	Greta Gerwig	August 4, 1983	Lady Bird	Nominated	
2020 (93rd)	Emerald Fennell	October 1, 1985	Promising Young Woman	Nominated	
2020 (93rd)	Chloé Zhao	March 31, 1982	Nomadland	Won	Zhao became the first Millennial woman to win.
2022 (95th)	Daniel Kwan Daniel Scheinert	February 10, 1988 June 7, 1987	Everything Everywhere All at Once	Won	Daniels became the first Millennial duo for a single film to win.
2024 (97th)	Brady Corbet	August 17, 1988	The Brutalist	Nominated	
2025 (98th)	Ryan Coogler	May 23, 1986	Sinners	Nominated	
2025 (98th)	Josh Safdie	April 3, 1984	Marty Supreme	Nominated	
2025 (98th)	Chloé Zhao	March 31, 1982	Hamnet	Nominated	Zhao became the first Millennial to be nominated for Best Director twice.

=== Best Original Screenplay ===
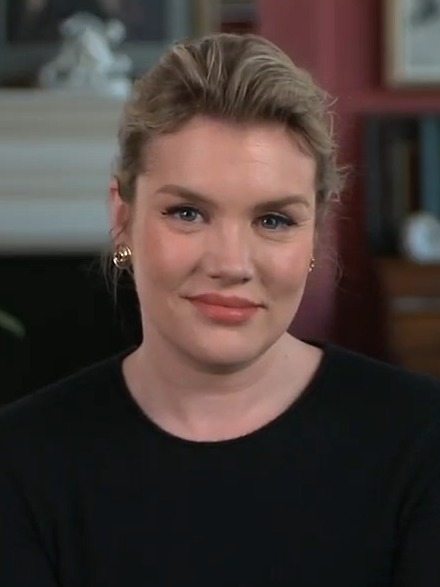
Fennell in 2023

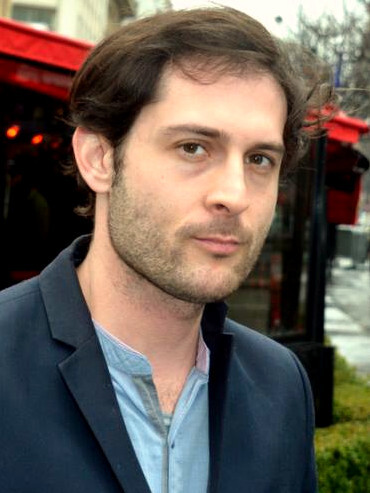
Harari in 2017

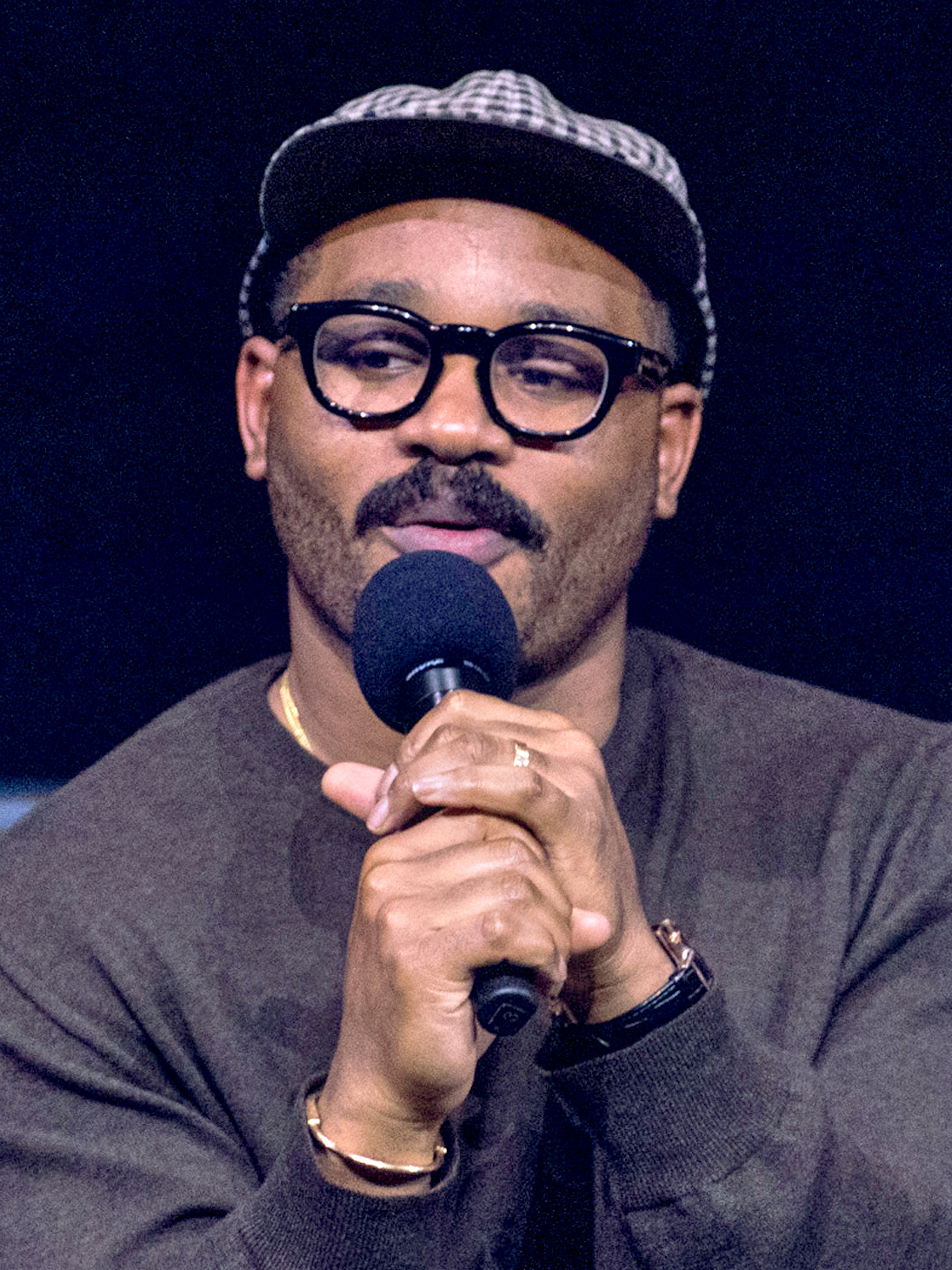
Coogler in 2025

Writing (Original Screenplay)
Year	Name	Born	Film	Result	Notes
2016 (89th)	Damien Chazelle	January 19, 1985	La La Land	Nominated	
2017 (90th)	Greta Gerwig	August 4, 1983	Lady Bird	Nominated	
2019 (92nd)	Han Jin-won	1986	Parasite	Won	
2019 (92nd)	Krysty Wilson-Cairns	May 26, 1987	1917	Nominated	
2020 (93rd)	Emerald Fennell	October 1, 1985	Promising Young Woman	Won	Fennell became the first Millennial woman to win.
2020 (93rd)	The Lucas Brothers	September 13, 1985	Judas and the Black Messiah	Nominated	
2020 (93rd)	Abraham Marder	March 3, 1983	Sound of Metal	Nominated	
2022 (95th)	Daniel Kwan Daniel Scheinert	February 10, 1988 June 7, 1987	Everything Everywhere All at Once	Won	Daniels became the first Millennial duo for a single film to win.
2023 (96th)	Arthur Harari	1981	Anatomy of a Fall	Won	
2023 (96th)	Samy Burch Alex Mechanik	December 15, 1986 October 18, 1986	May December	Nominated	
2023 (96th)	Celine Song	September 19, 1988	Past Lives	Nominated	
2024 (97th)	Moritz Binder Tim Fehlbaum	1982	September 5	Nominated	
2024 (97th)	Brady Corbet Mona Fastvold	August 17, 1988 March 7, 1981	The Brutalist	Nominated	
2024 (97th)	Jesse Eisenberg	October 5, 1983	A Real Pain	Nominated	
2025 (98th)	Ryan Coogler	May 23, 1986	Sinners	Won	
2025 (98th)	Josh Safdie	April 3, 1984	Marty Supreme	Nominated	

=== Best Adapted Screenplay ===
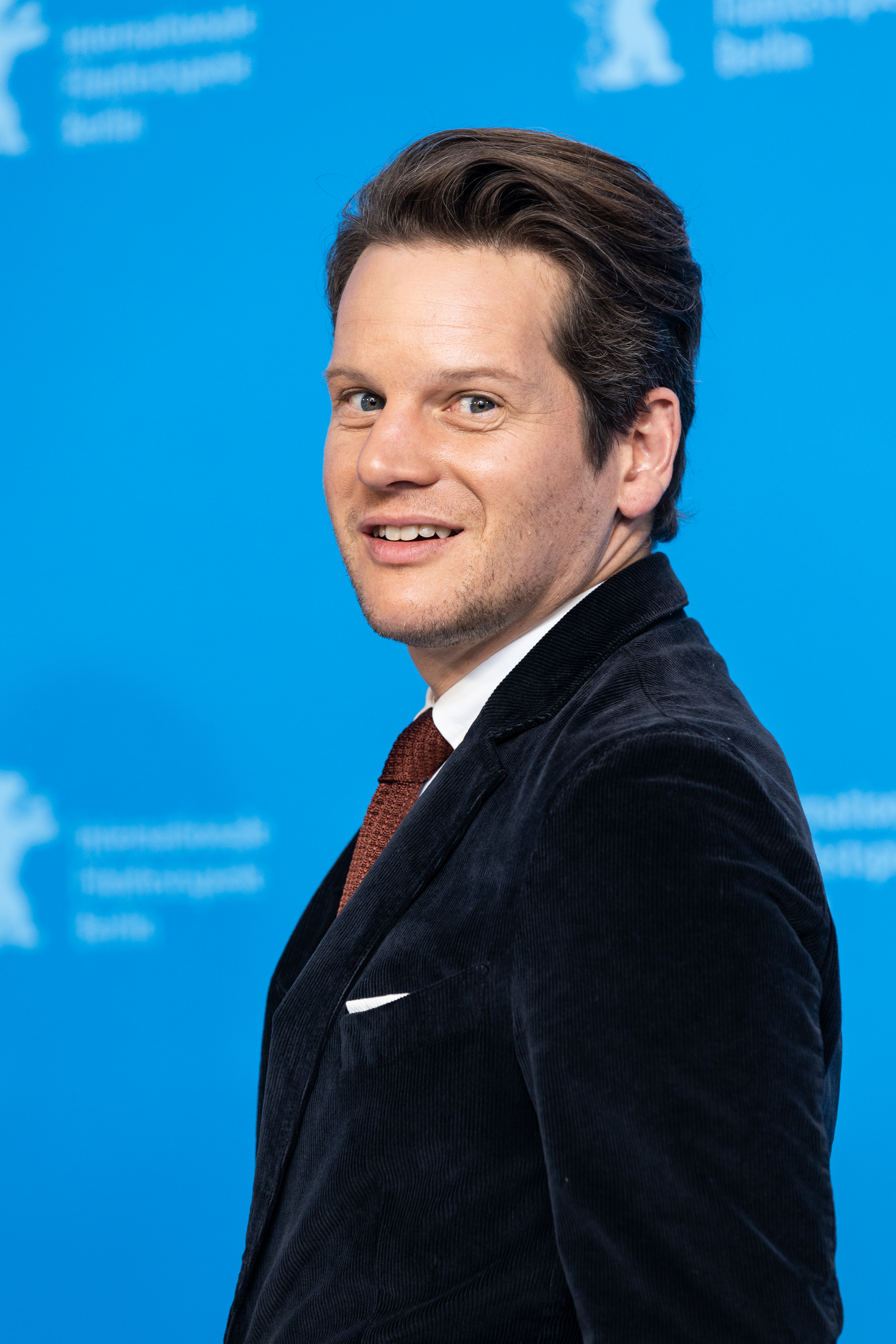
Moore in 2022

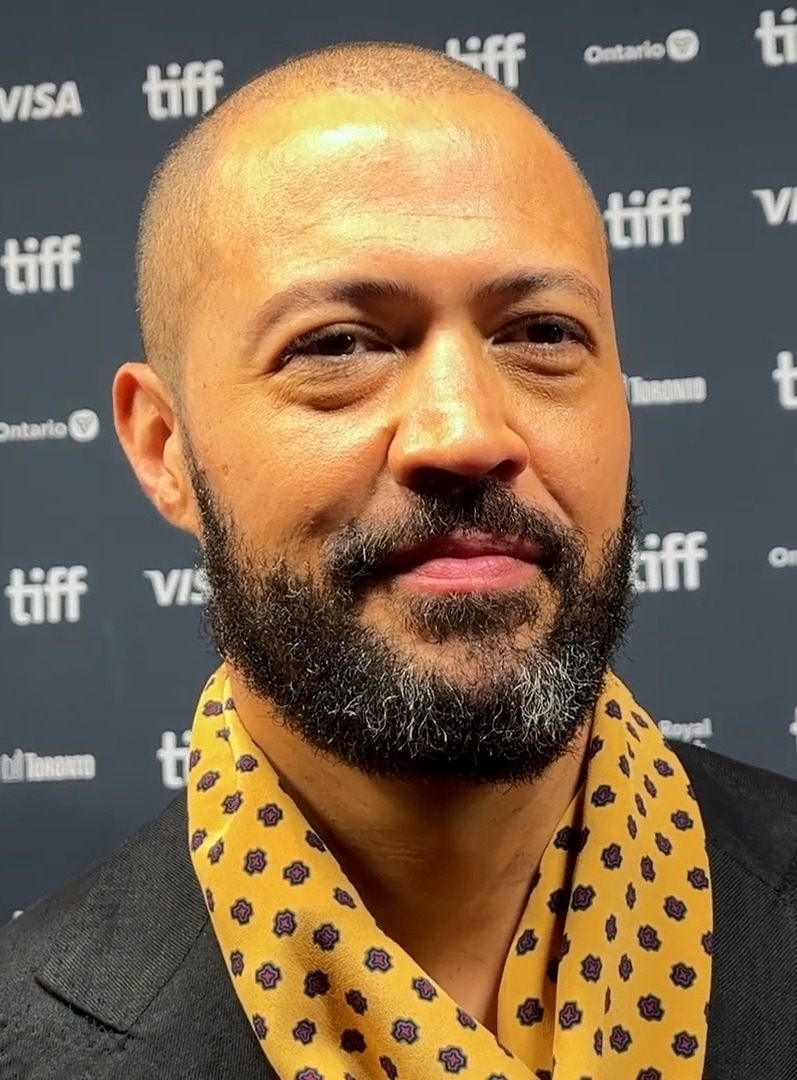
Jefferson in 2023

Writing (Adapted Screenplay)
Year	Name	Born	Film	Result	Notes
2012 (85th)	Lucy Alibar Benh Zeitlin	1983 October 14, 1982	Beasts of the Southern Wild	Nominated	
2014 (87th)	Damien Chazelle	January 19, 1985	Whiplash	Nominated	
2014 (87th)	Graham Moore	October 18, 1981	The Imitation Game	Won	
2018 (91st)	Charlie Wachtel David Rabinowitz	1987 1987	BlacKkKlansman	Won	
2018 (91st)	Will Fetters	May 20, 1981	A Star Is Born	Nominated	
2019 (92nd)	Greta Gerwig	August 4, 1983	Little Women	Nominated	
2020 (93rd)	Jena Friedman Nina Pedrad	January 11, 1983 September 15, 1988	Borat Subsequent Moviefilm	Nominated	
2020 (93rd)	Chloé Zhao	March 31, 1982	Nomadland	Nominated	
2021 (94th)	Takamasa Oe	January 6, 1981	Drive My Car	Nominated	
2023 (96th)	Greta Gerwig	August 4, 1983	Barbie	Nominated	
2023 (96th)	Cord Jefferson	1982	American Fiction	Won	
2024 (97th)	Léa Mysius	April 4, 1989	Emilia Pérez	Nominated	
2024 (97th)	RaMell Ross	1982	Nickel Boys	Nominated	
2024 (97th)	Clint Bentley Greg Kwedar	January 1, 1985 August 30, 1984	Sing Sing	Nominated	
2025 (98th)	Will Tracy	June 30, 1983	Bugonia	Nominated	
2025 (98th)	Chloé Zhao	March 31, 1982	Hamnet	Nominated	
2025 (98th)	Clint Bentley Greg Kwedar	January 1, 1985 August 30, 1984	Train Dreams	Nominated	

== Technical categories ==
=== Best Cinematography ===
Cinematography
Year	Name	Born	Film	Result	Notes
2014 (87th)	Łukasz Żal	June 24, 1981	Ida	Nominated	
2016 (89th)	James Laxton	February 3, 1981	Moonlight	Nominated	
2018 (91st)	Łukasz Żal	June 24, 1981	Cold War	Nominated	
2020 (93rd)	Joshua James Richards	1985	Nomadland	Nominated	
2021 (94th)	Ari Wegner	May 3, 1984	The Power of the Dog	Nominated	
2022 (95th)	James Friend	1985	All Quiet on the Western Front	Won	
2025 (98th)	Adolpho Veloso	May 31, 1989	Train Dreams	Nominated	

=== Best Costume Design ===
Costume Design
Year	Name	Born	Film	Result	Notes
2025 (98th)	Miyako Bellizzi	September 4, 1988	Marty Supreme	Nominated	

=== Best Film Editing ===
Film Editing
Year	Name	Born	Film	Result	Notes
2016 (89th)	Joi McMillon	November 1981	Moonlight	Nominated	
2020 (93rd)	Chloé Zhao	March 31, 1982	Nomadland	Nominated	
2022 (95th)	Paul Rogers	April 1984	Everything Everywhere All at Once	Won	
2023 (96th)	Jennifer Lame	1981/1982	Oppenheimer	Won	
2024 (97th)	Dávid Jancsó	July 2, 1982	The Brutalist	Nominated	
2025 (98th)	Andy Jurgensen	September 21, 1982	One Battle After Another	Won	
2025 (98th)	Josh Safdie	April 3, 1984	Marty Supreme	Nominated	
2025 (98th)	Michael Shawver	1984–1985	Sinners	Nominated	

=== Best Original Score ===
Original Score
Year	Name	Born	Film	Result	Notes
2013 (86th)	Will Butler	October 6, 1982	Her	Nominated	
2016 (89th)	Mica Levi	February 1986	Jackie	Nominated	
2016 (89th)	Justin Hurwitz	January 22, 1985	La La Land	Won	
2018 (91st)	Ludwig Göransson	September 1, 1984	Black Panther	Won	
2019 (92nd)	Hildur Guðnadóttir	September 4, 1982	Joker	Won	
2020 (93rd)	Emile Mosseri	August 11, 1985	Minari	Nominated	
2020 (93rd)	Jon Batiste	November 11, 1986	Soul	Won	
2022 (95th)	Justin Hurwitz	January 22, 1985	Babylon	Nominated	
2022 (95th)	Rafiq Bhatia Ian Chang	August 21, 1987 October 7, 1988	Everything Everywhere All at Once	Nominated	
2023 (96th)	Ludwig Göransson	September 1, 1984	Oppenheimer	Won	
2023 (96th)	Jerskin Fendrix	1995	Poor Things	Nominated	
2024 (97th)	Daniel Blumberg	1990	The Brutalist	Won	
2024 (97th)	Clément Ducol	November 23, 1981	Emilia Pérez	Nominated	
2024 (97th)	Kris Bowers	April 5, 1989	The Wild Robot	Nominated	
2025 (98th)	Jerskin Fendrix	1995	Bugonia	Nominated	
2025 (98th)	Ludwig Göransson	September 1, 1984	Sinners	Won	

=== Best Original Song ===
Original Song
Year	Name	Born	Film	Song	Result	Notes
2007 (80th)	Markéta Irglová	February 28, 1988	Once	"Falling Slowly"	Won	
2009 (82nd)	Ryan Bingham	March 31, 1981	Crazy Heart	"The Weary Kind"	Won	
2012 (85th)	Adele	May 5, 1988	Skyfall	"Skyfall"	Won	
2015 (88th)	The Weeknd Belly DaHeala	February 16, 1990 April 7, 1984 February 23, 1982	Fifty Shades of Grey	"Earned It"	Nominated	
2015 (88th)	Lady Gaga	March 28, 1986	The Hunting Ground	"Til It Happens to You"	Nominated	
2015 (88th)	Sam Smith Jimmy Napes	May 19, 1992 September 18, 1984	Spectre	"Writing's on the Wall"	Won	
2016 (89th)	Justin Hurwitz Benj Pasek Justin Paul	January 22, 1986 June 9, 1985 January 3, 1985	La La Land	"Audition (The Fools Who Dream)"	Nominated	
2016 (89th)	Justin Hurwitz Benj Pasek Justin Paul	January 22, 1986 June 9, 1985 January 3, 1985	La La Land	"City of Stars"	Won	
2016 (89th)	Justin Timberlake Shellback	January 31, 1981 February 1, 1985	Trolls	"Can't Stop the Feeling!"	Nominated	
2018 (91st)	Lady Gaga	March 28, 1986	A Star Is Born	"Shallow"	Won	
2018 (91st)	Kendrick Lamar SZA Sounwave	June 17, 1987 November 8, 1989 February 28, 1986	Black Panther	"All the Stars"	Nominated	
2019 (92nd)	Cynthia Erivo Joshuah Brian Campbell	January 8, 1987 September 1994	Harriet	"Stand Up"	Nominated	
2020 (93rd)	Rickard Göransson Fat Max Gsus	October 22, 1983 February 8, 1988	Eurovision Song Contest: The Story of Fire Saga	"Husavik"	Nominated	
2020 (93rd)	D'Mile Tiara Thomas	January 24, 1985 September 12, 1989	Judas and the Black Messiah	"Fight for You"	Won	
2020 (93rd)	Leslie Odom Jr.	August 6, 1981	One Night in Miami...	"Speak Now"	Nominated	
2020 (93rd)	Celeste	May 5, 1994	The Trial of the Chicago 7	"Hear My Voice"	Nominated	
2021 (94th)	Beyoncé Dixson	September 4, 1981 July 30, 1993	King Richard	"Be Alive"	Nominated	
2022 (95th)	Rihanna Tems Ryan Coogler Ludwig Göransson	February 20, 1988 June 11, 1995 May 23, 1986 September 1, 1984	Black Panther: Wakanda Forever	"Lift Me Up"	Nominated	
2022 (95th)	Mitski	September 27, 1990	Everything Everywhere All at Once	"This Is a Life"	Nominated	
2022 (95th)	Lady Gaga BloodPop	March 28, 1986 August 15, 1990	Top Gun: Maverick	"Hold My Hand"	Nominated	
2023 (96th)	Jon Batiste	November 11, 1986	American Symphony	"It Never Went Away"	Nominated	
2024 (97th)	Brandi Carlile Andrew Watt	June 1, 1981 October 20, 1990	Elton John: Never Too Late	"Never Too Late"	Nominated	
2024 (97th)	Clément Ducol	November 23, 1981	Emilia Pérez	"El Mal"	Won	
2024 (97th)	Clément Ducol	November 23, 1981	Emilia Pérez	"Mi Camino"	Nominated	
2024 (97th)	Abraham Alexander	July 25, 1990	Sing Sing	"Like a Bird"	Nominated	
2025 (98th)	Ejae Mark Sonnenblick	December 6, 1991 February 6, 1990	KPop Demon Hunters	"Golden"	Won	
2025 (98th)	Ludwig Göransson	September 1, 1984	Sinners	"I Lied to You"	Nominated	

In addition, numerous Millennials have been nominated or won in other technical categories, including Mike Fontaine for Best Makeup and Hairstyling, Benjamin A. Burtt for Best Sound, and Florencia Martin for Best Production Design.

== See also ==
- List of Academy Award records
- List of oldest and youngest Academy Award winners and nominees
- List of Generation Z Academy Award winners and nominees
