= Tatsuji Nojima =

Japanese visual effects artist

- 野島 達司
- Born: 13 October 1998 (age 26); Suginami, Tokyo, Japan
- Occupation(s): Visual effects artist, digital compositor
- Years active: 2016–present
- Website: tatsujinojima.com

Tatsuji Nojima (野島 達司, Nojima Tatsuji; born 13 October 1998) is a Japanese visual effects artist and compositor. In 2024, he won the Academy Award for Best Visual Effects for his work on Godzilla Minus One (2023).

== Life and career ==
Nojima was born on 13 October 1998, in Suginami, Tokyo, Japan. In his childhood, Nojima was fascinated by Back to the Future and Pirates of the Caribbean, which sparked his interest in visual effects. He began his career during his third year at high school in 2016, working as the motion graphic designer on Noboru Iguchi's Slavemen (released in 2017). In April 2019, he became a full-time employee at Shirogumi.

He has created the visual effects for Opening Night, Sugiteike, Entai 10-dai (both 2017), Ghost Squad, Shōjo Pikaresuku (both 2018), and Astral Abnormal Suzuki (2019). He also made the ocean simulation sequences in Godzilla Minus One (2023). For the film, he became one of the four recipients (the other three being visual effects supervisor Takashi Yamazaki, visual effects director Kiyoko Shibuya, and CG director Masaki Takahashi) of the Academy Award for Best Visual Effects at the 96th Academy Awards, becoming the youngest winner at 25, and the first person of Generation Z to win in that category.

== Filmography ==
- Slavemen (2017) - motion graphic designer
- Opening Night (2017) - Visual effects
- Sugiteike, Entai 10-dai (2017) - Visual effects
- Ghost Squad (2018) - Visual effects
- Shōjo Pikaresuku (2018) - Visual effects
- Astral Abnormal Suzuki (2019) - Visual effects
- Stand by Me Doraemon 2 (2020) - digital compositor
- Godzilla the Ride (2021) - Visual effects and compositor
- Ghost Book Obakezukan (2022) - Ittan-momen effects creator and compositor
- Godzilla Minus One (2023) - ocean effects creator and compositor

== See also ==
- List of Generation Z Academy Award winners and nominees
