= Masaki Takahashi =

Japanese visual effects artist

- 高橋 正紀
- Born: 1968 (age 57–58); Tokyo, Japan
- Occupations: CG director, visual effects artist, production manager
- Years active: 1990–present

Masaki Takahashi (高橋 正紀, Takahashi Masaki; born 1968) is a Japanese CG director and visual effects artist. He is also the second production manager at Shirogumi's Chōfu Studio. For the film Godzilla Minus One (2023), Takahashi (alongside visual effects supervisor Takashi Yamazaki, visual effects director Kiyoko Shibuya, and visual effects compositor Tatsuji Nojima) won the Academy Award for Best Visual Effects at the 96th Academy Awards.

Takahashi began his career at Shirogumi in 1990 and has since worked on several films, video games, television dramas, and exhibitions. Most notably, he has collaborated with famed filmmaker Takashi Yamazaki since his first film Juvenile in 2000. In 2004, he became a lecturer at Kurashiki University of Science and the Arts.

== Filmography ==
=== Films ===
- Juvenile (2000)
- Returner (2002) - Chief 3DCG artist
- Always: Sunset on Third Street (2005)
- Always: Sunset on Third Street 2 (2007)
- Ballad (2009)
- Space Battleship Yamato (2010)
- Always: Sunset on Third Street '64 (2012)
- The Eternal Zero (2013)
- Parasyte: Part 1 (2014)
- Parasyte: Part 2 (2015)
- A Man Called Pirate (2016)
- Destiny: The Tale of Kamakura (2017)
- Code Blue: The Movie (2018) - VFX director [with Etsushi Sugawara]
- The Great War of Archimedes (2019)
- Godzilla Minus One (2023) - 3D CG director

=== Video games ===
- Shadows of the Damned (2011)
- Dark Souls III (2016)
