= List of Generation Z Academy Award winners and nominees =

This article lists individuals (including filmmakers, actors, actresses, and others) born from 1997 to 2012, colloquially known as Generation Z (shortened for Gen Z or Zoomers), to be nominated or win an Academy Award starting in the early 2010s.

== Performance ==
=== Best Actress in a Leading Role ===
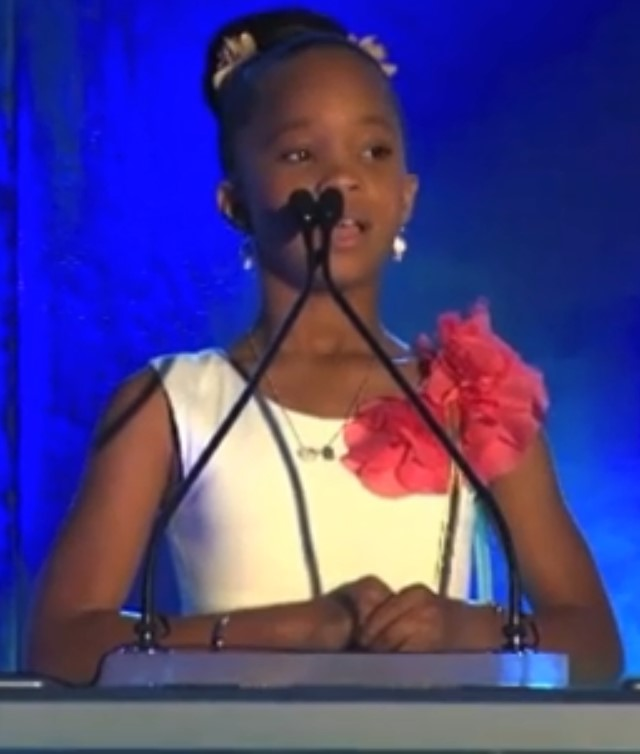
Wallis in 2013

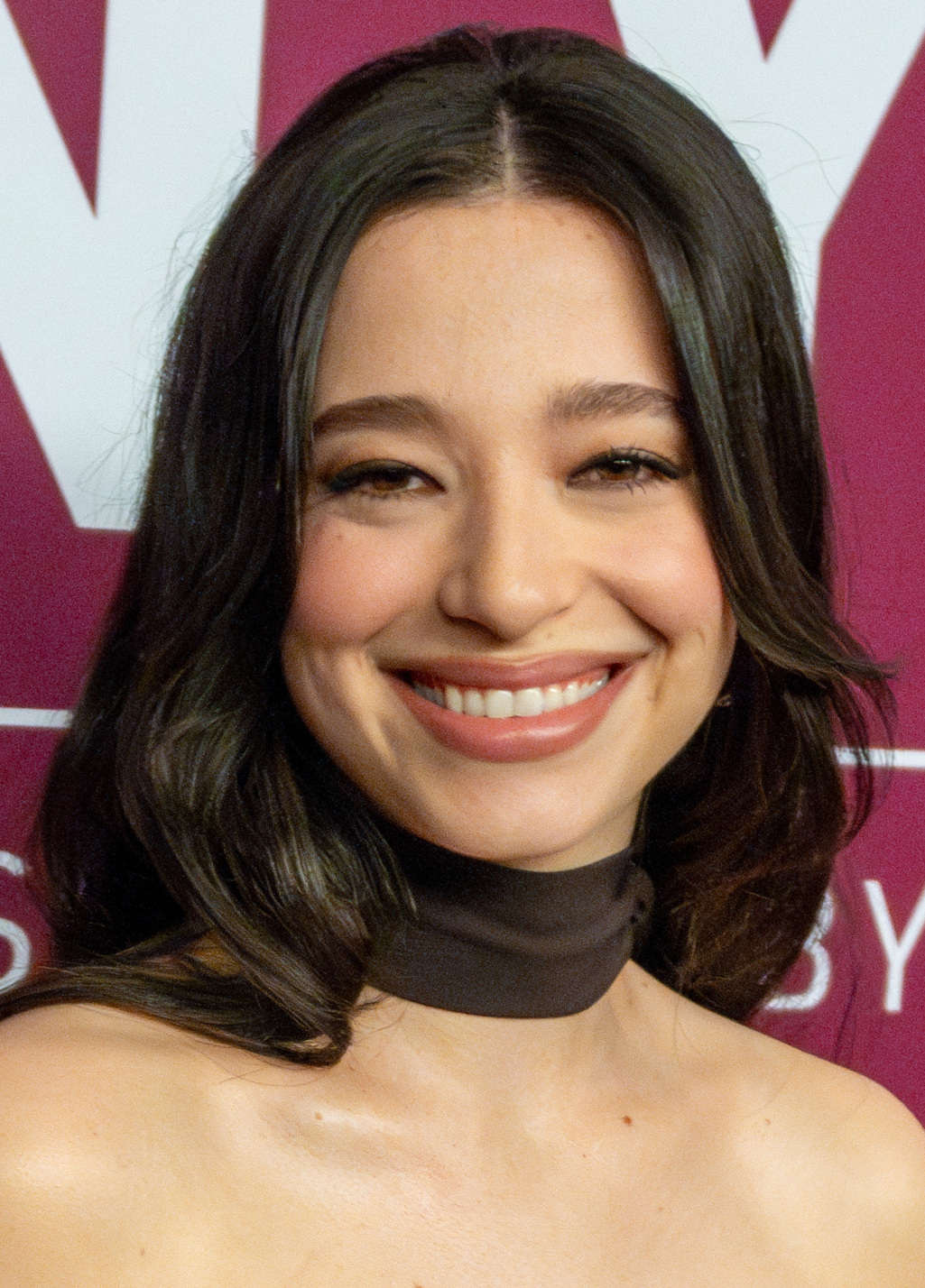
Madison in 2024

Year	Name	Born	Film	Status	Notes
2012 (85th)	Quvenzhané Wallis	August 28, 2003	Beasts of the Southern Wild	Nominated	Wallis is the first person born in 21st century to be nominated for an Academy Award in any category. (Note: While she remains as the only person born in the 21st century to be nominated for an acting Oscar, Wallis holds the additional distinction of being the youngest living Oscar nominee by present age, as of 2026.)
2024 (97th)	Mikey Madison	March 25, 1999	Anora	Won	Madison is the first person of Gen Z to win in any acting category.

=== Best Actor in a Supporting Role ===
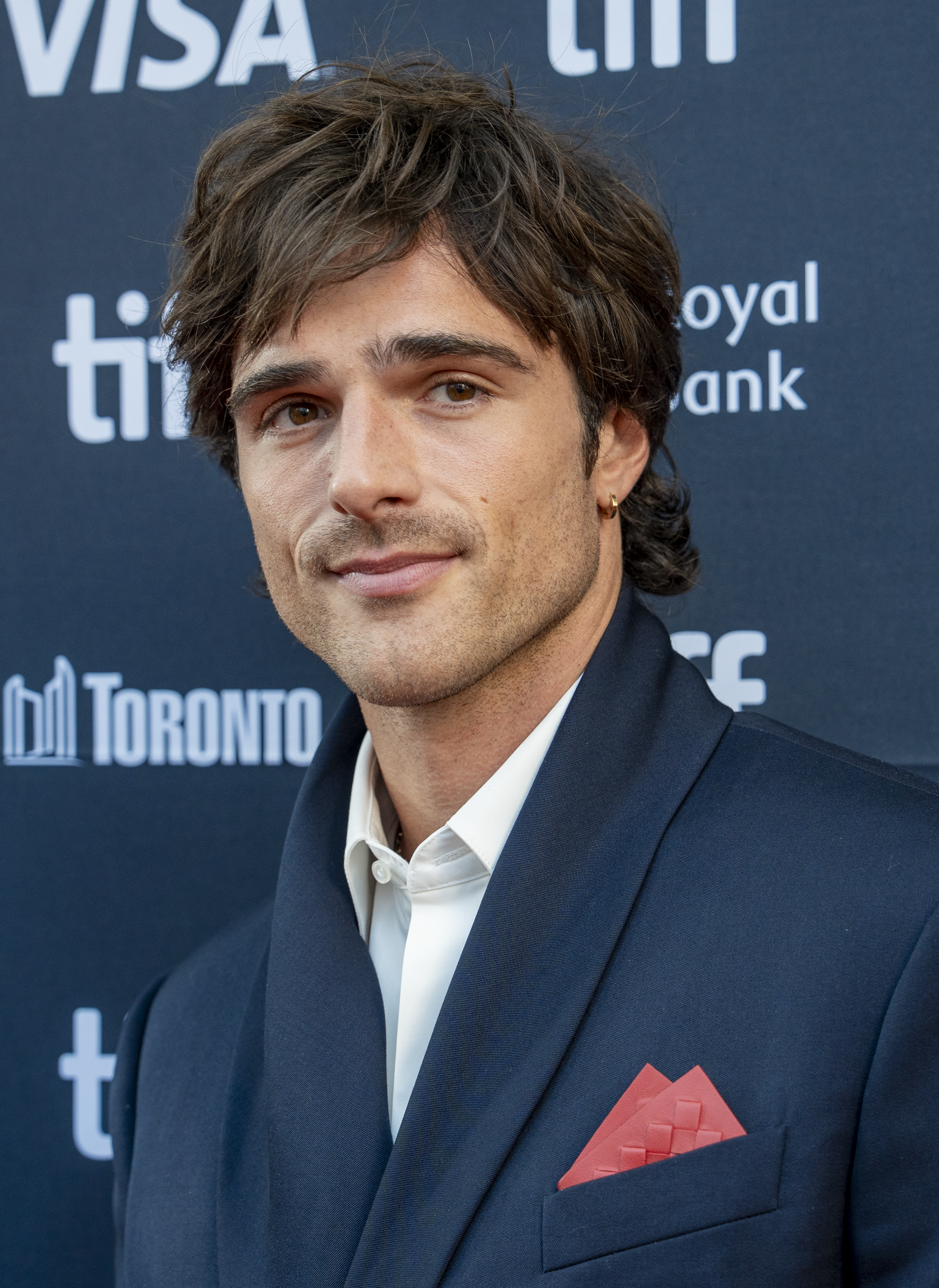
Elordi in 2025

Year	Name	Born	Film	Status	Notes
2025 (98th)	Jacob Elordi	June 26, 1997	Frankenstein	Nominated	Elordi is the first person of Gen Z to be nominated for Best Supporting Actor, and the first male actor of Gen Z to be nominated in any acting category.

=== Best Actress in a Supporting Role ===
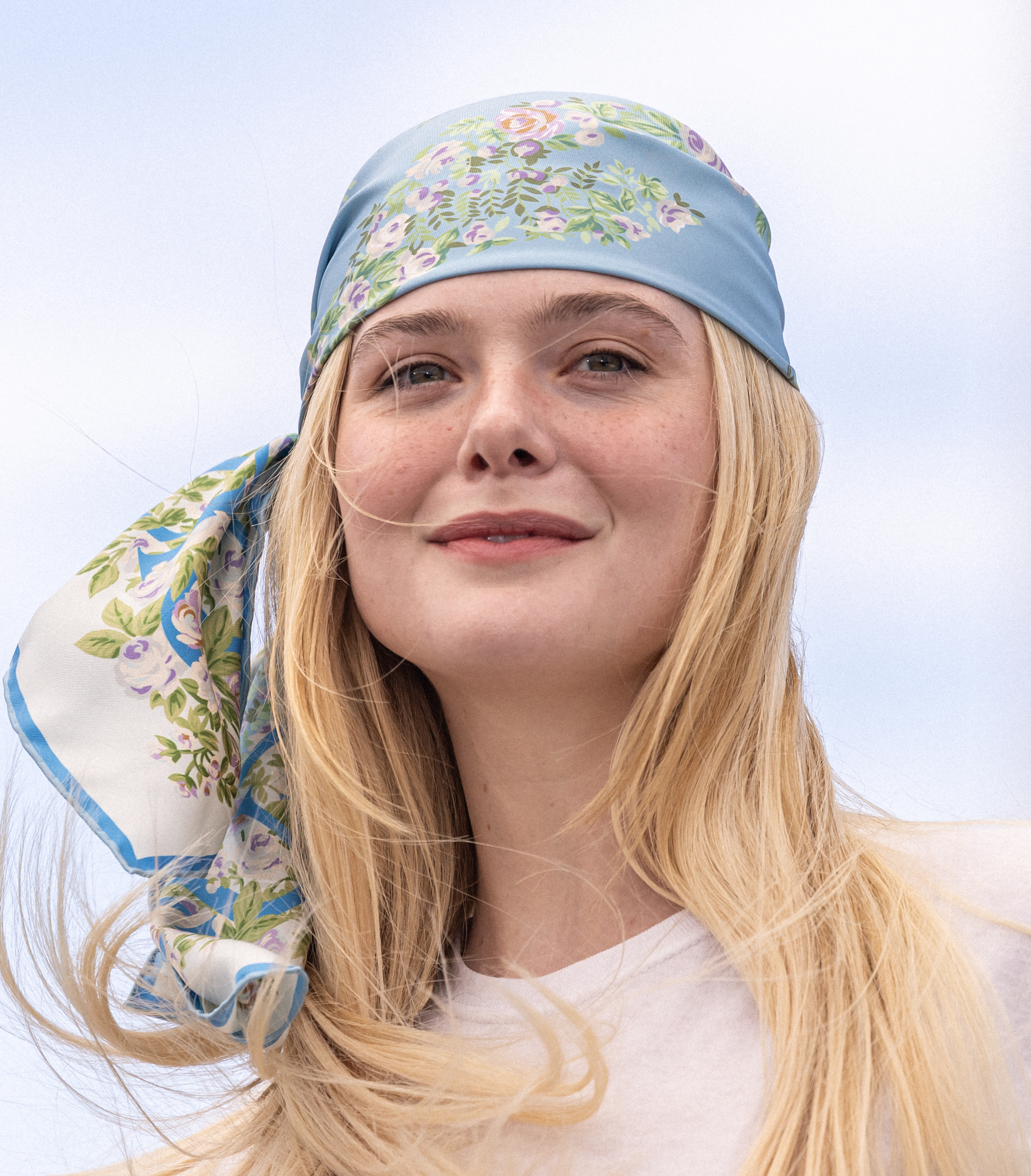
Fanning in 2025

Year	Name	Born	Film	Status	Notes
2025 (98th)	Elle Fanning	April 9, 1998	Sentimental Value	Nominated	Fanning is the first person of Gen Z to be nominated for Best Supporting Actress.

== Best Original Song ==
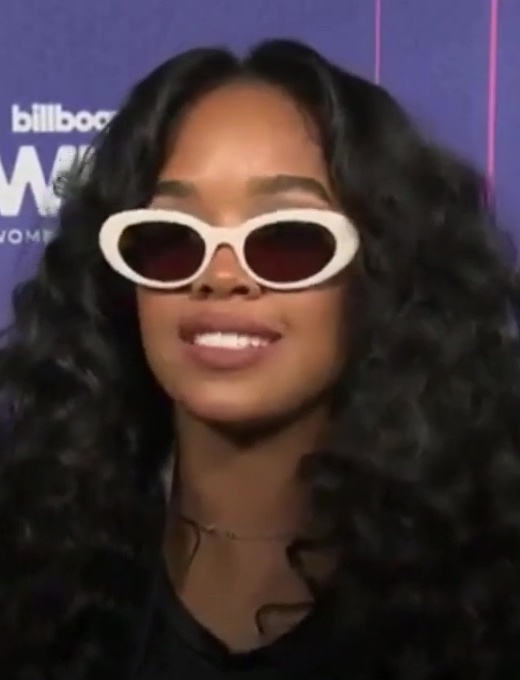
H.E.R. in 2022

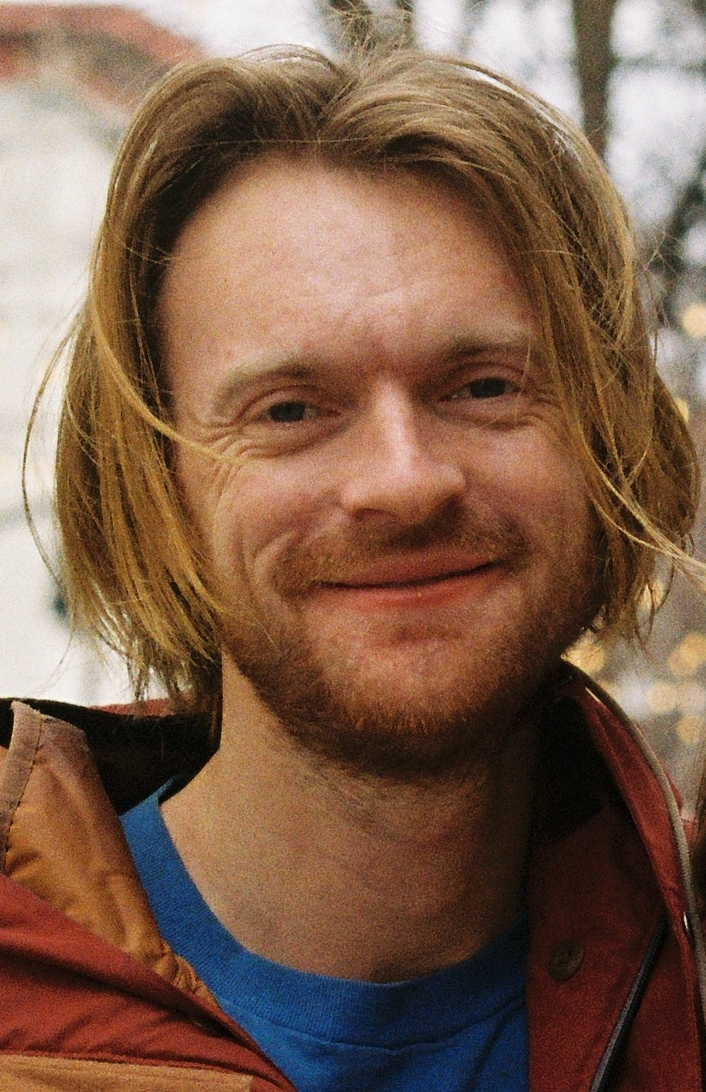
O'Connell in 2025

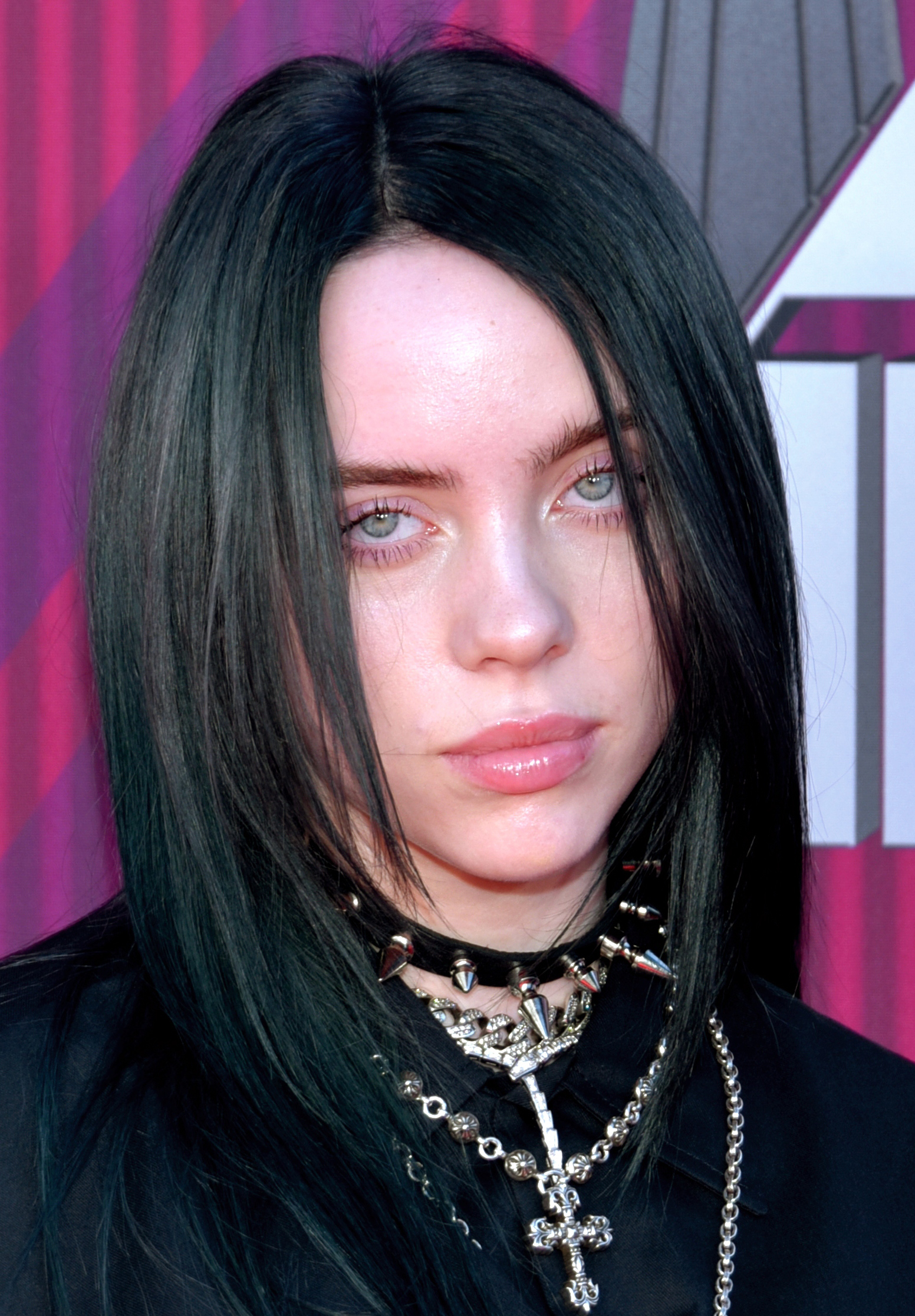
Eilish in 2019

Year	Name	Born	Film	Status	Notes
2020 (93rd)	H.E.R.	June 27, 1997	Judas and the Black Messiah	Won	H.E.R. is the first person of Gen Z to win an Academy Award in any category.
2021 (94th)	Finneas O'Connell Billie Eilish	July 30, 1997 December 18, 2001	No Time to Die	Won	O'Connell and Eilish are the first siblings of Gen Z to be nominated and win an Academy Award; Eilish became the first person born in the 21st century to win in any category.
2023 (96th)	Finneas O'Connell Billie Eilish	July 30, 1997 December 18, 2001	Barbie	Won	O'Connell and Eilish are the first siblings of Gen Z to win more than once; Eilish became the first person born in the 21st century to win more than once as well as the youngest two-time winner in Academy Awards history.

== Best Visual Effects ==
Year	Name	Born	Film	Status	Notes
2023 (96th)	Tatsuji Nojima	October 13, 1998	Godzilla Minus One	Won	Nojima is the first person of Gen Z (as well as the youngest) to win Best Visual Effects, and the first non-American of Gen Z for a non-English-language film to win.

== Best Live Action Short Film ==
Year	Name	Born	Film	Status	Notes
2025 (98th)	Meyer Levinson-Blount	2002	Butcher's Stain	Nominated	Levinson-Blount was awarded the Silver Medal in Narrative at the Student Academy Awards for this film.

== See also ==
- List of Academy Award records
- List of oldest and youngest Academy Award winners and nominees
- List of Millennial Academy Award winners and nominees
