= List of Academy Award records =

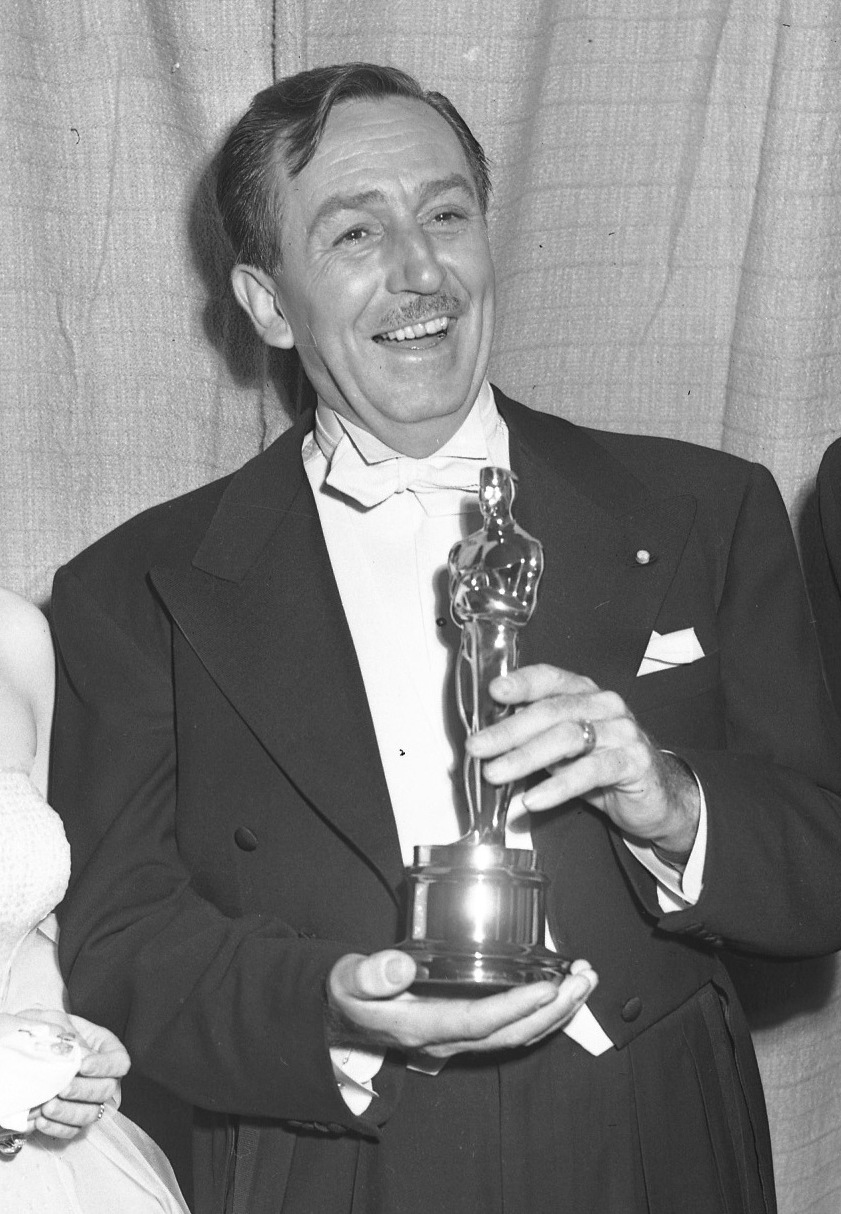
Walt Disney, the record-holder for most Academy Awards won (22 Oscars)

This list of Academy Award records is current as of the 98th Academy Awards ceremony held on March 15, 2026.

== Most awards or nominations ==
- Most awards won by a single film: 11
  - Three films have won 11 Academy Awards:
    - Ben-Hur (1959): nominated in 12 of the 15 possible categories
    - Titanic (1997): nominated in 14 of the 17 possible categories
    - The Lord of the Rings: The Return of the King (2003): nominated in 11 of the 17 possible categories
- Most nominations received by a single film: 16
  - Sinners (2025): out of 17 possible categories
- Most nominations lost by a single film: 12
  - Sinners (2025): won 4 of its 16 nominations
- Most nominations received by a single film without winning an award: 11
  - Two films have received 11 nominations and won no awards:
    - The Turning Point (1977): from 14 possible categories
    - The Color Purple (1985): from 17 possible categories
- Largest sweep (winning awards in every nominated category): 11
  - The Lord of the Rings: The Return of the King (2003) won in every category for which it was nominated: Best Picture, Director, Adapted Screenplay, Art Direction, Makeup, Costume Design, Film Editing, Original Score, Original Song, Sound Mixing, and Visual Effects.
- Most total awards won by a person: 22
  - Walt Disney
  - Dennis Muren holds the record for the most awards by a living person: 9
- Most total nominations received and awards won by a woman: 35 and 8
  - Edith Head, all for Best Costume Design
  - Meryl Streep holds the record for the most nominations for a living woman: 21
- Most total nominations for a person: 59
  - Walt Disney
  - John Williams holds the record for the most nominations by a living person: 54
- Most nominations and awards for a person in a single year: 6 and 4
  - In 1954, Walt Disney received six nominations and won four awards, both records. He won Best Documentary, Features for The Living Desert; Best Documentary, Short Subjects for The Alaskan Eskimo; Best Short Subject, Cartoons for Toot, Whistle, Plunk and Boom; and Best Short Subject, Two-reel for Bear Country. He had two additional nominations in Best Short Subject, Cartoons for Rugged Bear; and Best Short Subject, Two-reel for Ben and Me.
  - In 2025, Sean Baker won four awards from four nominations. He won Best Picture, Best Director, Best Original Screenplay, and Best Editing, all for Anora.
- Most competitive awards won by a living person: 8
  - Composer Alan Menken has won eight competitive awards
  - Milena Canonero, Colleen Atwood, and Frances McDormand have all won four competitive awards, making them the most awarded living women
  - Note: Visual Effects Supervisor Dennis Muren has won nine Academy Awards: six competitive awards, two "Special Achievement" awards, and one "Technical Achievement" award
- Most competitive awards won for Acting: 4
  - Katharine Hepburn, all for Best Actress
- Most competitive awards won for Directing: 4
  - John Ford
- Most competitive awards won for Writing: 3
  - Woody Allen, all for Best Original Screenplay
  - Charles Brackett, for both Best Adapted and Original Screenplay
  - Paddy Chayefsky, for both Best Adapted and Original Screenplay
  - Francis Ford Coppola, for both Best Adapted and Original Screenplay
  - Billy Wilder, for both Best Adapted and Original Screenplay
- Most competitive awards won for Film Editing: 3
  - Ralph Dawson
  - Michael Kahn
  - Daniel Mandell
  - Thelma Schoonmaker
- Most competitive awards won for Cinematography: 4
  - Joseph Ruttenberg
  - Leon Shamroy
- Most competitive awards won for Film Music Composition and Songwriting: 9
  - Alfred Newman, all for Best Original Score
  - Note:
    - Alan Menken has won eight awards in musical categories
    - John Williams has won five awards and holds the record for the most nominations by a living person at 54.
    - Sammy Cahn won four awards, all for Best Original Song
    - Johnny Mercer won four awards, all for Best Original Song
    - Jimmy Van Heusen won four awards, all for Best Original Song
- Most competitive awards won for Art Direction: 11
  - Cedric Gibbons, who designed the Oscar statuette, received 38 nominations
- Most competitive awards won for Costume Design: 8
  - Edith Head has received 35 nominations in total and holds the records for the most nominations and awards for a woman
- Most competitive awards won for Makeup: 7
  - Rick Baker, who has received 11 nominations in total
- Most competitive awards won for Visual Effects: 8
  - Dennis Muren, who has received 15 nominations in total
- Most competitive awards won for Special Effects (discontinued in 1962): 3
  - A. Arnold Gillespie, who received 12 nominations in total
- Most awards won for Animated Feature Film: 3
  - Pete Docter, who has received four nominations in total
- Most nominations received for Animated Feature Film: 4
  - Pete Docter, winning 3
  - Hayao Miyazaki, winning 2
  - Chris Sanders, winning 0
  - Byron Howard, winning 2
- Most awards won by a country for Best International Feature Film: 14
  - Italy, which has received 33 nominations in total
- Most nominations received by a country for Best International Feature Film: 43
  - France, which has won the award 12 times
- Most nominations received by a country for Best International Feature Film without an award: 10
  - Israel
- Most awards won by a non-English language film: 4
  - Four non-English language films have won four Academy Awards:
    - Fanny and Alexander (1982) won Best Foreign Language Film, Best Art Direction, Best Cinematography, and Best Costume Design
    - Crouching Tiger, Hidden Dragon (2000) won Best Foreign Language Film, Best Art Direction, Best Cinematography, and Best Original Score
    - Parasite (2019) won Best International Feature Film, Best Picture, Best Director, and Best Original Screenplay
    - All Quiet on the Western Front (2022) won Best International Feature Film, Best Production Design, Best Cinematography, and Best Original Score
- Most nominations received by a non-English language film: 13
  - One non-English language film has been nominated for thirteen Academy Awards:
    - Emilia Pérez (2024): Best International Feature Film, Best Picture, Best Director, Best Adapted Screenplay, Best Actress, Best Supporting Actress, Best Cinematography, Best Film Editing, Best Sound, Best Makeup and Hairstyling, Best Original Score, and Best Original Song (x2)

== Awards for acting and directing debuts ==
These people won Academy Awards for their debut performances in film:

- Best Actor
  - None
- Best Actress
  - Shirley Booth (Come Back, Little Sheba, 1952)
  - Julie Andrews (Mary Poppins, 1964)
  - Barbra Streisand (Funny Girl, 1968)
  - Marlee Matlin (Children of a Lesser God, 1986)
- Best Supporting Actor
  - Harold Russell (The Best Years of Our Lives, 1946)
  - Timothy Hutton (Ordinary People, 1980)
  - Haing S. Ngor (The Killing Fields, 1984)
- Best Supporting Actress
  - Gale Sondergaard (Anthony Adverse, 1936)
  - Katina Paxinou (For Whom the Bell Tolls, 1943)
  - Mercedes McCambridge (All the King's Men, 1949)
  - Eva Marie Saint (On the Waterfront, 1954)
  - Jo Van Fleet (East of Eden, 1955)
  - Tatum O'Neal (Paper Moon, 1973)
  - Anna Paquin (The Piano, 1993)
  - Jennifer Hudson (Dreamgirls, 2006)
  - Lupita Nyong'o (12 Years a Slave, 2013)
- Honorary Award
  - Harold Russell (The Best Years of Our Lives, 1946)
- Academy Juvenile Award
  - Claude Jarman Jr. (The Yearling, 1946)
  - Vincent Winter (The Little Kidnappers, 1954)

These people won Academy Awards for their directing debuts:

- Best Director
  - Delbert Mann (Marty, 1955)
  - Jerome Robbins (West Side Story, 1961)
  - Robert Redford (Ordinary People, 1980)
  - James L. Brooks (Terms of Endearment, 1983)
  - Kevin Costner (Dances with Wolves, 1990)
  - Sam Mendes (American Beauty, 1999)

== Big Five winners ==
Three films have received the Big Five Academy Awards: Best Picture, Director, Actor, Actress, and Screenplay (Original or Adapted; all won for Best Adapted Screenplay).

- It Happened One Night (1934)
- One Flew Over the Cuckoo's Nest (1975)
- The Silence of the Lambs (1991)

== Most consecutive awards in each category ==
- **Any awards**
  - Walt Disney received record 10 awards in the eight consecutive years from 1931/32 through 1939. Eight (listed below) are for Short Subject (Cartoon), and two were Special Awards: one for the creation of Mickey Mouse, and one recognizing the innovation of Snow White and the Seven Dwarfs.
- **Best Picture**
  - David O. Selznick produced two consecutive Best Picture winners Gone with the Wind in 1939 and Rebecca in 1940 (He himself was not awarded the Oscars as at the time the statuette went to the studio instead of the producer)
- **Best Director**
  - Three directors have won two consecutive awards (of which, one of each of their films (**in bold**) won the Academy Award for Best Picture, and one did not):
    - John Ford – The Grapes of Wrath (1940) and **How Green Was My Valley** (1941)
    - Joseph L. Mankiewicz – A Letter to Three Wives (1949) and **All About Eve** (1950)
    - Alejandro G. Iñárritu – **Birdman or (The Unexpected Virtue of Ignorance)** (2014) and The Revenant (2015)
- **Best Actor**
  - Two actors have won two consecutive awards:
    - Spencer Tracy – Captains Courageous (1937) and Boys Town (1938)
    - Tom Hanks – Philadelphia (1993) and Forrest Gump (1994)
- **Best Actress**
  - Two actresses have won two consecutive awards:
    - Luise Rainer – The Great Ziegfeld (1936) and The Good Earth (1937)
    - Katharine Hepburn – Guess Who's Coming to Dinner (1967) and The Lion in Winter (1968)
- **Best Supporting Actor**
  - Jason Robards won two consecutive awards for All the President's Men in 1976 and Julia in 1977
- **Best Supporting Actress**
  - No consecutive winner for Best Supporting Actress
- **Best Adapted Screenplay**
  - Two screenwriters have won two consecutive awards:
    - Joseph L. Mankiewicz – A Letter to Three Wives (1949) and All About Eve (1950)
    - Robert Bolt – Doctor Zhivago (1965) and A Man for All Seasons (1966)
- **Best Original Screenplay**
  - No consecutive winner for Best Original Screenplay
- **Best Art Direction**
  - Thomas Little won four consecutive awards for Best Art Direction. He won **Best Art Direction, Black and White**, for the films How Green Was My Valley in 1941, This Above All in 1942, and The Song of Bernadette in 1943, and then he won an Oscar the next year in 1944 for **Best Art Direction, Color** for the film Wilson
- **Best Cinematography**
  - Emmanuel Lubezki won three consecutive awards for Gravity in 2013, Birdman or (The Unexpected Virtue of Ignorance) in 2014 and The Revenant in 2015
- **Best Costume Design**
  - Of Edith Head's eight awards won for Best Costume Design, three were won in consecutive years: in 1949 for The Heiress, in 1950 for All About Eve, and in 1951 for A Place in the Sun for **Best Costume Design, Black-and-White**; in 1950 she also won for Samson and Delilah for **Best Costume Design, Color**
- **Best Film Editing**
  - Angus Wall and Kirk Baxter won for The Social Network in 2010, and The Girl with the Dragon Tattoo in 2011
- **Best Original Score**
  - Roger Edens won three consecutive awards for composing the scores for Easter Parade (1948), On the Town (1949), and Annie Get Your Gun (1950)
  - Alfred Newman won two consecutive awards in **Best Scoring of a Musical Picture** for With a Song in My Heart (1952), and Call Me Madam (1953).
  - André Previn won two consecutive awards on two occasions; first in **Best Scoring of a Musical Picture** for Gigi (1958) and Porgy and Bess (1959), then in **Best Scoring of Music-Adaptation and Treatment** for Irma La Douce (1963) and My Fair Lady (1964)
  - Alan Menken won two consecutive awards for composing the scores for Beauty and the Beast (1991) and Aladdin (1992)
  - Gustavo Santaolalla won two consecutive awards for composing the scores for Brokeback Mountain (2005) and Babel (2006)
- **Best Original Song**
  - Three composers have won two consecutive awards for best original song, but under different award names:
    - Henry Mancini (music) and Johnny Mercer (lyrics) shared the awards in **Best Music (Song)** for "Moon River" from Breakfast at Tiffany's in 1961, and "Days of Wine and Roses" from Days of Wine and Roses in 1962
    - Alan Menken (music) won twice consecutively in **Best Music (Original Song)** for "Beauty and the Beast" from Beauty and the Beast (lyrics by Howard Ashman) in 1991, and "A Whole New World" from Aladdin (lyrics by Tim Rice) in 1992
- **Best Sound Mixing**
  - Thomas Moulton won three consecutive awards for The Snake Pit in 1948, Twelve O'Clock High in 1949, and All About Eve in 1950
- **Best Visual Effects**
  - Glen Robinson won four consecutive non-competitive wins Earthquake in 1974, The Hindenburg in 1975, and both King Kong and Logan's Run in 1976
  - Of Dennis Muren's eight Academy Awards for Best Visual Effects, three of them were consecutive wins (under different names); E.T. The Extra Terrestrial in 1982, Return of the Jedi in 1983, and Indiana Jones and the Temple of Doom in 1984.
  - Jim Rygiel and Randall William Cook won three consecutive visual effects Oscars for The Lord of the Rings: The Fellowship of the Ring (2001), The Lord of the Rings: The Two Towers (2002), and The Lord of the Rings: The Return of the King (2003)
- **Best Documentary (Feature)**
  - Walt Disney won two consecutive awards for The Living Desert in 1953 and The Vanishing Prairie in 1954
- **Best Short Subject (Cartoon)**
  - Of Walt Disney's many awards for Best Animated Short, eight of these wins were in consecutive years, for Flowers and Trees in 1931/32, Three Little Pigs in 1932/33, The Tortoise and the Hare in 1934, Three Orphan Kittens in 1935, The Country Cousin in 1936, The Old Mill in 1937, Ferdinand the Bull in 1938, and The Ugly Duckling in 1939
- **Best Short Subject (Two-Reel)**
  - Of Walt Disney's multiple awards for Best Live Action Short, four of his wins were in consecutive years, in 1950 for In Beaver Valley, in 1951 for Nature's Half Acre, in 1952 for Water Birds, and in 1953 for Bear Country

== Academy Award firsts ==
Overall firsts

- First Best Picture winner
  - Wings (1927)
- First Best Picture winning sound film
  - The Broadway Melody (1929)
- First Best Picture winning color film
  - Gone with the Wind (1939)
- First Best Director co-winners (for the same film)
  - Robert Wise and Jerome Robbins for West Side Story (1961)

Demographic firsts (age, nationality, ethnicity, sex/gender, disability)

- First person born in the 20th century to be nominated for (and win) an Oscar
  - Janet Gaynor, for Best Actress, 7th Heaven, Street Angel, Sunrise (1928)
- First person born in the 21st century to win an Oscar
  - Billie Eilish, for Best Original Song, "No Time to Die" from No Time to Die (2021)
- First person born in the 21st century to be nominated for an Oscar
  - Quvenzhané Wallis, for Best Actress, Beasts of the Southern Wild (2012)
- First child actor to receive an acting nomination
  - Jackie Cooper, age 9, was nominated for Best Actor for Skippy (1931)
- First African to win for Acting
  - Charlize Theron (from South Africa), Best Actress for Monster (2003)
- First Black African to win for Acting
  - Lupita Nyong'o (from Kenya), Best Supporting Actress for 12 Years a Slave (2013)
- First Asian to win Best Director
  - Ang Lee (from Taiwan) won for Brokeback Mountain (2005)
- First Asian to win for Acting
  - Miyoshi Umeki (from Japan), Best Supporting Actress for Sayonara (1957)
- First European to win Best Director
  - David Lean (from England) for The Bridge on the River Kwai (1957)
- First European to win for Acting
  - Emil Jannings (from Germany) for The Last Command and The Way of All Flesh (1927/1928)
- First Latin American to win Best Director
  - Alfonso Cuarón (from Mexico) won for Gravity (2013)
- First Latin American to win for Acting
  - José Ferrer (from Puerto Rico), Best Actor for Cyrano de Bergerac (1950)
- First person from Oceania to win Best Director
  - Peter Jackson (from New Zealand) for The Lord of the Rings: The Return of the King (2003)
- First person from Oceania to win for Acting
  - Peter Finch (from Australia), Best Actor for Network (1976)
- First Asian person to win Best Picture
  - Bong Joon-ho and Kwak Sin-ae (both from South Korea) for Parasite (2019)
- First Asian woman to win Best Actress
  - Michelle Yeoh (from Malaysia) for Everything Everywhere All at Once (2022)
- First Asian person to be nominated in an acting category
  - Merle Oberon (from India) for Dark Angel (1935)
- First Asian person to be nominated for Best Picture
  - Ismail Merchant (from India) for A Room with a View (1986)
- First Asian person (and non-Caucasian) to win Best Director
  - Ang Lee (from Taiwan) for Brokeback Mountain (2005)
- First Asian person (and non-Caucasian) to be nominated for Best Director
  - Hiroshi Teshigahara (from Japan) for Woman in the Dunes (1965)
- First Asian person to receive an Honorary Award
  - Akira Kurosawa (from Japan) received an Honorary Award in 1989
- First Asian woman to be nominated for (and win) Best Director
  - Chloé Zhao for Nomadland (2020)
- First Black person to win an Oscar
  - Hattie McDaniel, Best Supporting Actress for Gone with the Wind (1939)
- First Black woman to win Best Actress
  - Halle Berry for Monster's Ball (2001)
- First Black person (and non-Caucasian) to win Best Picture
  - Steve McQueen for 12 Years a Slave (2013)
- First Black person (and non-Caucasian) to be nominated for Best Picture
  - Quincy Jones for The Color Purple (1985)
- First Black director to be nominated for Best Director
  - John Singleton for Boyz n the Hood (1991)
- First Black writer to win for screenwriting
  - Geoffrey S. Fletcher won Best Adapted Screenplay for Precious: Based on the Novel "Push" by Sapphire (2009)
- First Black person (and non-Caucasian) to receive an Honorary Award
  - James Baskett received a special Academy Award for his portrayal of Uncle Remus in Song of the South (1946)
- First Native American person to be nominated for an Oscar
  - Chief Dan George for Little Big Man (1970)
- First Native American woman to be nominated for an Oscar
  - Lily Gladstone for Killers of the Flower Moon (2023)
- First Polynesian person and woman to be nominated for an Oscar
  - Jocelyne LaGarde for Hawaii (1966)
- First Polynesian person to win an Oscar
  - Russell Crowe for Gladiator (2000)
- First Polynesian people nominated for Best Picture
  - Taika Waititi and Chelsea Winstanley for Jojo Rabbit (2019)
- First Polynesian writer to win for screenwriting
  - Taika Waititi won Best Adapted Screenplay for Jojo Rabbit (2019)
- First film with an entirely non-White cast to win Best Picture
  - Slumdog Millionaire (2008)
- First film with an all-Black cast to win Best Picture
  - Moonlight (2016)
- First woman to be nominated for and win Best Picture
  - Julia Phillips for The Sting (1973)
- First woman to win Best Documentary
  - Nancy Hamilton for Helen Keller in Her Story (1955)
- First woman to be nominated for Best Documentary
  - Janice Loeb for The Quiet One (1948)
- First woman to win Best Director
  - Kathryn Bigelow for The Hurt Locker (2009)
- First woman to be nominated for Best Director
  - Lina Wertmüller for Seven Beauties (1976)
- First woman to be nominated twice for Best Director (* = winner)
  - Jane Campion for The Piano (1993) and The Power of the Dog (2021)*
- First woman to win Best Animated Feature
  - Brenda Chapman for Brave (2012)
- First woman to be nominated for Best Animated Feature
  - Marjane Satrapi for Persepolis (2007)
- First woman to win Best Original Score
  - Rachel Portman for Emma (1996)
- First woman to win Best Cinematography
  - Autumn Durald Arkapaw for Sinners (2025)
- First woman to be nominated for Best Cinematography
  - Rachel Morrison for Mudbound (2017)
- First woman to receive each of the Honorary Awards
  - Shirley Temple received an Academy Juvenile Award in 1934
  - Greta Garbo received an Honorary Award in 1954
  - Martha Raye received a Jean Hersholt Humanitarian Award in 1969
  - Kay Rose received a Special Achievement Academy Award for Sound Effects Editing of The River in 1985
  - Kathleen Kennedy received an Irving G. Thalberg Memorial Award in 2018
- First openly transgender woman nominated for an Oscar
  - Angela Morley for The Little Prince (1974)
- First openly transgender woman to be nominated for an acting Oscar
  - Karla Sofía Gascón for Emilia Pérez (2024)
- First Deaf actress to be nominated for and win an acting award
  - Marlee Matlin won Best Actress for Children of a Lesser God (1986)
- First Deaf actor to be nominated for and win an acting award
  - Troy Kotsur won Best Supporting Actor for CODA (2021)
- First autistic actor to win an Oscar
  - Anthony Hopkins won Best Actor for The Silence of the Lambs (1991)
- First actress with dwarfism to win in an acting category
  - Linda Hunt won Best Supporting Actress for The Year of Living Dangerously (1982)
- First actor with dwarfism to be nominated in an acting category
  - Michael Dunn was nominated for Best Supporting Actor for Ship of Fools (1965)

Non-English language firsts

- First non-English language film to win Best Picture
  - Parasite (2019), in Korean
- First non-English language film to be nominated for Best Picture
  - La Grande Illusion (1937), in French
- First African film to win Best International Feature Film
  - Z (1969), representing Algeria
- First Asian film to win Best International Feature Film
  - Crouching Tiger, Hidden Dragon (2000), representing Taiwan
- First European film to win Best International Feature Film
  - Shoe-Shine (1947), representing Italy
- First Latin American film to win Best International Feature Film
  - The Official Story (1985), representing Argentina
- First Middle Eastern film to win Best International Feature Film
  - A Separation (2011), representing Iran
- First North American film to win Best International Feature Film
  - The Barbarian Invasions (2003), representing Canada
- All non-English language films to be nominated for Best Picture

Year	Film title used in nomination	Original title	Director	Award recipient(s)	Country of production	Language(s)	Notes
1937 (11th)	La Grande Illusion	La Grande Illusion	Jean Renoir	Réalisation d'art cinématographique (production company)	France	French (some parts in German, English & Russian)	^{[A]}
1969 (42nd)	Z	Z	Costa-Gavras	Jacques Perrin; Ahmed Rachedi	France; Algeria	French
1971 (45th)	The Emigrants	Utvandrarna	Jan Troell	Bengt Forslund	Sweden	Swedish
1972 (46th)	Cries and Whispers	Viskningar och rop	Ingmar Bergman	Ingmar Bergman	Sweden	Swedish
1994 (68th)	Il Postino: The Postman	Il postino	Michael Radford	Mario Cecchi Gori; Vittorio Cecchi Gori; Gaetano Daniele	Italy	Italian (some parts in Spanish)	(Note: The film was not submitted for consideration by Italy, possibly due to being directed by a British person)
1997 (71st)	Life Is Beautiful	La vita è bella	Roberto Benigni	Elda Ferri; Gianluigi Braschi	Italy	Italian (some parts in German & English)
2000 (73rd)	Crouching Tiger, Hidden Dragon	Wòhǔ Cánglóng (pinyin) 臥虎藏龍 (traditional Chinese) 卧虎藏龙 (simplified Chinese)	Ang Lee	Bill Kong; Hsu Li-kong; Ang Lee	Taiwan; China; Hong Kong; United States	Mandarin
2006 (79th)	Letters from Iwo Jima	Letters from Iwo Jima (English); Iô-Jima kara no tegami 硫黄島からの手紙 (Japanese)	Clint Eastwood	Clint Eastwood; Steven Spielberg; Robert Lorenz	United States	Japanese (some parts in English)
2006 (79th)	Babel	Babel	Alejandro González Iñárritu	Alejandro González Iñárritu; Jon Kilik; Steve Golin	United States; Mexico; France	English, Arabic, Spanish, Japanese, Japanese Sign language, Berber languages
2012 (85th)	Amour	Amour	Michael Haneke	Margaret Menegoz; Stefan Arndt; Veit Heiduschka; Michael Katz	Austria; France; Germany	French
2018 (91st)	Roma	Roma	Alfonso Cuarón	Gabriela Rodríguez; Alfonso Cuarón	Mexico; United States	Spanish, Mixtec
2019 (92nd)	Parasite	Gisaengchung 기생충 (Korean)	Bong Joon-ho	Kwak Sin-ae; Bong Joon-ho	South Korea	Korean
2020 (93rd)	Minari	Minari (English) 미나리 (Korean)	Lee Isaac Chung	Christina Oh	United States	Korean (some parts in English)
2021 (94th)	Drive My Car	ドライブ・マイ・カー Doraibu mai kā (Japanese)	Ryusuke Hamaguchi	Teruhisa Yamamoto	Japan	Japanese (some parts in European languages)
2022 (95th)	All Quiet on the Western Front	Im Westen nichts Neues	Edward Berger	Malte Grunert	Germany	German (some parts in French)
2023 (96th)	Anatomy of a Fall	Anatomie d'une chute	Justine Triet	Marie-Ange Luciani; David Thion	France	French, English, German
2023 (96th)	Past Lives	Past Lives	Celine Song	David Hinojosa; Christine Vachon; Pamela Koffler	United States; South Korea	Korean, English
2023 (96th)	The Zone of Interest	The Zone of Interest	Jonathan Glazer	James Wilson	United Kingdom; United States; Poland	German, Polish, Yiddish
2024 (97th)	Emilia Pérez	Emilia Pérez	Jacques Audiard	Pascal Caucheteux; Jacques Audiard	France	Spanish
2024 (97th)	I'm Still Here	Ainda Estou Aqui	Walter Salles	Maria Carlota Bruno; Rodrigo Teixeira	Brazil; France	Portuguese
2025 (98th)	The Secret Agent	O Agente Secreto	Kleber Mendonça Filho	Emilie Lesclaux	Brazil; France; Germany; The Netherlands	Portuguese, German
2025 (98th)	Sentimental Value	Affeksjonsverd	Joachim Trier	Maria Ekerhovd; Andrea Berentsen Ottmar	Norway; France; Germany; Denmark; Sweden; United Kingdom	Norwegian, English

Genre and studio firsts

- First film by genre to win Best Picture
  - Silent, War, Epic: Wings (1927)
  - Musical: The Broadway Melody (1929)
  - Western: Cimarron (1931)
  - Drama: Grand Hotel (1932)
  - Screwball, Comedy: It Happened One Night (1934)
  - Historical, Adventure: Mutiny on the Bounty (1935)
  - Biopic: The Great Ziegfeld (1936)
  - Romance: Gone with the Wind (1939)
  - Thriller: Rebecca (1940)
  - Crime, Mystery, Neo-noir: In the Heat of the Night (1967)
  - Sports: Rocky (1976)
  - Horror: The Silence of the Lambs (1991)
  - Disaster: Titanic (1997)
  - Fantasy: The Lord of the Rings: The Return of the King (2003)
  - LGBTQ+: Moonlight (2016)
  - Independent, Martial arts, Science-fiction: Everything Everywhere All at Once (2022)
  - Action: One Battle After Another (2025)
- First horror film to be nominated for Best Picture
  - The Exorcist (1973)
- First superhero film to be nominated for Best Picture
  - Black Panther (2018)
- First X-rated film to be nominated for and win Best Picture
  - Midnight Cowboy (1969)
- First 3-D film to be nominated for Best Picture
  - Avatar and Up (2009)
- First streaming service film to be nominated for Best Picture
  - Manchester by the Sea (2016), distributed by Amazon Studios
- First streaming service film to win Best Picture
  - CODA (2021), distributed by Apple TV+ Original Films
- First short film to win an Oscar outside of the Short Film categories
  - The Red Balloon (1956) for Best Original Screenplay
- First hip hop song to win Best Original Song
  - "Lose Yourself" by Eminem, from the film 8 Mile (2002)
- First professional athlete to win an Oscar
  - Kobe Bryant won Best Animated Short Film for Dear Basketball (2017)

Animated firsts

- First animated film to win an Oscar
  - Pinocchio (1940) for Best Original Score and Best Original Song
  - Pinocchio was also the first animated film to win both music categories; a feat repeated by The Little Mermaid (1989), Beauty and the Beast (1991), Aladdin (1992), The Lion King (1994), and Pocahontas (1995)
- First animated film to be nominated for an Oscar
  - Snow White and the Seven Dwarfs (1937) for Best Original Score
- First animated film to be nominated for Best Picture
  - Beauty and the Beast (1991)
- First animated film to be nominated for a writing award
  - Toy Story (1995), nominated for Best Original Screenplay
- First animated film to win Best Animated Feature
  - Shrek (2001)
- First stop motion animated film to win Best Animated Feature
  - Wallace & Gromit: The Curse of the Were-Rabbit (2005)
- First non-English language film to win Best Animated Feature
  - Spirited Away (2001)
- First PG-13 rated film to win Best Animated Feature
  - The Boy and the Heron (2023)
- First R-rated film to be nominated for Best Animated Feature
  - Anomalisa (2015)
- First animated film to be nominated for Best International Feature Film
  - Waltz with Bashir (2008), Israel
- First animated film to be nominated for Best Documentary Feature
  - Flee (2021)
- All animated films to be nominated for Best Picture

Year	Film title	Award recipient(s)	Production Company	Notes
1991 (64th)	Beauty and the Beast	Don Hahn	Walt Disney Feature Animation
2009 (82nd)	Up	Jonas Rivera	Pixar Animation Studios
2010 (83rd)	Toy Story 3	Darla K. Anderson	Pixar Animation Studios

Acting firsts

- First actor to receive ten nominations for acting
  - Bette Davis received her tenth acting nomination (all for Best Actress) for the film What Ever Happened to Baby Jane? (1962)
- First male actor to receive ten nominations for acting
  - Laurence Olivier received his tenth acting nomination (nine for Best Actor and one for Best Supporting Actor) for the film The Boys from Brazil (1978)
- First actor to receive twenty nominations for acting
  - Meryl Streep received her twentieth nomination (sixteen for Best Actress and four for Best Supporting Actress) for the film Florence Foster Jenkins (2016)
- First person to direct themselves to an Oscar win
  - Laurence Olivier won Best Actor for Hamlet (1948), which he also directed, produced, and adapted
- First film to win both an Oscar and a Golden Raspberry Award
  - Wall Street (1987), Michael Douglas won an Academy Award for Best Actor and Daryl Hannah won a Golden Raspberry Award for Worst Supporting Actress
- First actor to be nominated for both an Oscar and a Golden Raspberry Award for the same performance in a film
  - James Coco was nominated for both Best Supporting Actor and Worst Supporting Actor for Only When I Laugh (1981)
- First actress to be nominated for both an Oscar and a Golden Raspberry Award for the same performance in a film
  - Amy Irving was nominated for both Best Supporting Actress and Worst Supporting Actress for Yentl (1983)
- First posthumous win for acting
  - Peter Finch won Best Actor for Network (1976)
- First posthumous nomination for acting
  - Jeanne Eagels, nominated for Best Actress for The Letter (1929)
- First posthumous nomination for an actor
  - James Dean, nominated for Best Actor for East of Eden (1955)
- First posthumous nomination for a Black actor
  - Chadwick Boseman, nominated for Best Actor for Ma Rainey's Black Bottom (2020)
- First person to be nominated for acting and songwriting in the same year
  - Mary J. Blige, nominated for Best Supporting Actress and Best Original Song ("Mighty River") for Mudbound (2017)
- First person to win for acting and producing in the same year
  - Frances McDormand won Best Actress and Best Picture for Nomadland (2020)
- First actress to be nominated for performing in a language other than English
  - Melina Mercouri was nominated for Best Actress for Never on Sunday (1960), performing in Greek
- First actress to win for performing in a language other than English
  - Sophia Loren won Best Actress for Two Women (1961), performing in Italian
- First actor to be nominated for performing in a language other than English
  - Marcello Mastroianni was nominated for Best Actor for Divorce Italian Style (1961), performing in Italian
- First actor to win for performing in a language other than English
  - Robert De Niro won Best Supporting Actor for The Godfather Part II (1974), performing in Italian
- First acting win for a portrayal of a character of the opposite gender
  - Linda Hunt won Best Supporting Actress for The Year of Living Dangerously (1982)
- First portrayals of living persons to win in each acting category
  - Best Actor: Spencer Tracy as Father Edward J. Flanagan in Boys Town (1938)
  - Best Actress: Sissy Spacek as Loretta Lynn in Coal Miner's Daughter (1980)
  - Best Supporting Actor: Jason Robards as Ben Bradlee in All the President's Men (1976)
  - Best Supporting Actress: Patty Duke as Helen Keller in The Miracle Worker (1962)
    - Note: While Joanne Woodward's portrayal of Eve White in The Three Faces of Eve (1957) was based on a real person, Chris Costner Sizemore; her identity was not known until 1977.

== Age-related records ==
- Youngest winner of an acting award
  - Tatum O'Neal, age 10 (Best Supporting Actress, Paper Moon, 1973)
- Youngest nominee of an acting award
  - Justin Henry, age 8 (Best Supporting Actor, Kramer vs. Kramer, 1979)
- Youngest Best Actress winner
  - Marlee Matlin, age 21 (Children of a Lesser God, 1986)
- Youngest Best Actress nominee
  - Quvenzhané Wallis, age 9 (Beasts of the Southern Wild, 2012)
- Youngest Best Actor winner
  - Adrien Brody, age 29 (The Pianist, 2002)
- Youngest Best Actor nominee
  - Jackie Cooper, age 9 (Skippy, 1931)
- Youngest winner of an Oscar
  - Shirley Temple, age 6, who was awarded the (now-retired) non-competitive Academy Juvenile Award in 1934
- Youngest winner of two Oscars
  - Billie Eilish, age 22, who has won the Best Original Song category with her brother, Finneas, twice ("No Time to Die", 2021 and "What Was I Made For?", 2023)
- Youngest Best Original Screenplay winner
  - Ben Affleck, age 25 (Good Will Hunting, 1997)
- Youngest Best Adapted Screenplay winner
  - Charlie Wachtel, age 32 (BlacKkKlansman, 2018)
- Youngest Best Director winner
  - Damien Chazelle, age 32 (La La Land, 2016)
- Youngest Best Director nominee
  - John Singleton, age 24 (Boyz n the Hood, 1991)
- Oldest winner of an acting award
  - Anthony Hopkins, age 83 (Best Actor, The Father, 2020)
- Oldest nominee for an acting award
  - Christopher Plummer, age 88 (Best Supporting Actor, All the Money in the World, 2017)
- Oldest Best Actress winner
  - Jessica Tandy, age 80 (Driving Miss Daisy, 1989)
- Oldest Best Actress nominee
  - Emmanuelle Riva, age 85 (Amour, 2012)
- Oldest Best Actor nominee and winner
  - Anthony Hopkins, age 83 (The Father, 2020)
- Oldest Best Director winner
  - Clint Eastwood, age 74 (Million Dollar Baby, 2004)
- Oldest Best Director nominee
  - Martin Scorsese, age 81 (Killers of the Flower Moon, 2023)
- Oldest competitive Oscar winner
  - James Ivory, age 89 (Best Adapted Screenplay, Call Me by Your Name, 2017)
- Oldest competitive Oscar nominee
  - John Williams, age 91 (Best Original Score, Indiana Jones and the Dial of Destiny, 2023)
- Oldest living Oscar nominee and winner
  - Lee Grant, age 100 (Best Supporting Actress, Shampoo, 1975)
- Longest-lived Oscar nominee and winner
  - Luise Rainer, age 104 years, 352 days (Best Actress, The Great Ziegfeld, 1936 and The Good Earth, 1937)
- Earliest-born Oscar winner by birth year
  - George Arliss, born April 10, 1868 (Best Actor, Disraeli, 1929)
- Earliest-born Oscar nominee by birth year
  - May Robson, born April 19, 1858 (Best Actress, Lady for a Day, 1933)
- Year where all four acting winners had the oldest average age
  - 1981 with an average age of 70.5 years old.
    - Henry Fonda (aged 77)
    - Katharine Hepburn (72)
    - John Gielgud (77)
    - Maureen Stapleton (56)
- Year where all four acting winners had the youngest average age
  - 1961 with a combined average age of just under 29 years old.
    - Maximilian Schell (aged 31)
    - Sophia Loren (27)
    - George Chakiris (27)
    - Rita Moreno (30)
- Youngest multiple nominees for an acting award (Best Actor or Best Supporting Actor)

Nomination	Name	Age	Film	Year	Date of birth	Date of nomination
2nd	Sal Mineo	22 years, 17 days	Exodus	1960	January 10, 1939	January 27, 1961
3rd	Marlon Brando	29 years, 318 days	Julius Caesar	1953	April 3, 1924	February 15, 1954
4th	Marlon Brando	30 years, 315 days	On the Waterfront	1954	April 3, 1924	February 12, 1955
5th	Marlon Brando	33 years, 321 days	Sayonara	1957	April 3, 1924	February 18, 1958
6th	Richard Burton	44 years, 98 days	Anne of the Thousand Days	1969	November 10, 1925	February 16, 1970
7th	Jack Nicholson	46 years, 300 days	Terms of Endearment	1983	April 22, 1937	February 16, 1984
8th	Jack Nicholson	48 years, 289 days	Prizzi's Honor	1985	April 22, 1937	February 5, 1986
9th	Jack Nicholson	50 years, 301 days	Ironweed	1987	April 22, 1937	February 17, 1988
10th	Jack Nicholson	55 years, 302 days	A Few Good Men	1992	April 22, 1937	February 18, 1993

- Youngest multiple nominees for an acting award (Best Actress or Best Supporting Actress)

Nomination	Name	Age	Film	Year	Date of birth	Date of nomination
2nd	Angela Lansbury	20 years, 103 days	The Picture of Dorian Gray	1945	October 16, 1925	January 27, 1946
3rd	Jennifer Lawrence	23 years, 154 days	American Hustle	2013	August 15, 1990	January 16, 2014
4th	Jennifer Lawrence	25 years, 152 days	Joy	2015	August 15, 1990	January 14, 2016
5th	Kate Winslet	31 years, 110 days	Little Children	2006	October 5, 1975	January 23, 2007
6th	Kate Winslet	33 years, 109 days	The Reader	2008	October 5, 1975	January 22, 2009
7th	Bette Davis	36 years, 304 days	Mr. Skeffington	1944	April 5, 1908	February 3, 1945
8th	Meryl Streep	39 years, 238 days	A Cry in the Dark	1988	June 22, 1949	February 15, 1989
9th	Meryl Streep	41 years, 236 days	Postcards from the Edge	1990	June 22, 1949	February 13, 1991
10th	Meryl Streep	46 years, 236 days	The Bridges of Madison County	1995	June 22, 1949	February 13, 1996

== Film records ==
- Most Oscar wins without winning Best Picture
  - Cabaret (1972) won 8 awards
- Most nominations without winning Best Picture
  - Sinners (2025) with 16 nominations
- Most nominations without a Best Picture nomination
  - They Shoot Horses, Don't They? (1969) with 9 nominations
- Most Oscar wins without a nomination for Best Picture
  - The Bad and the Beautiful (1952) with 5 wins
- Fewest awards and nominations for a Best Picture winner
  - Grand Hotel (1932) received only the Best Picture nomination
- Most nominations without a major nomination (Picture, Director, Acting and Screenplay)
  - Pepe (1960), which received 7 nominations with no major nominations
  - These seven films received 6 nominations with no major nominations:
    - The Rains Came (1939)
    - Hans Christian Andersen (1952)
    - It's a Mad, Mad, Mad, Mad World (1963)
    - Empire of the Sun (1987)
    - Who Framed Roger Rabbit (1988) (note: received 7 nominations when "special achievement" is included)
    - Terminator 2: Judgment Day (1991)
    - Memoirs of a Geisha (2005)
- Best Picture nominees that won every nomination except Best Picture
  - These 16 films were nominated for Best Picture and won in every category they were nominated for, except Best Picture:
    - Bad Girl (1931), 2/3
    - The Private Life of Henry VIII (1932), 1/2
    - Naughty Marietta (1935), 1/2
    - The Story of Louis Pasteur (1936), 3/4
    - The Adventures of Robin Hood (1938), 3/4
    - Miracle on 34th Street (1947), 3/4
    - The Treasure of the Sierra Madre (1948), 3/4
    - A Letter to Three Wives (1949), 2/3
    - King Solomon's Mines (1950), 2/3
    - Three Coins in the Fountain (1954), 2/3
    - Jaws (1975), 3/4
    - Traffic (2000), 4/5
    - The Blind Side (2009), 1/2
    - Selma (2014), 1/2
    - Bohemian Rhapsody (2018), 4/5
    - Women Talking (2022), 1/2
- Films nominated for Best Picture with no other major nominations
  - These 33 films were nominated for Best Picture but had no other major nominations (this does not include films that were only nominated for Best Picture and nothing else):
    - Wings (1927), 2 nominations
    - 42nd Street (1933), 2 nominations
    - A Farewell to Arms (1933), 4 nominations
    - Cleopatra (1934), 5 nominations
    - Flirtation Walk (1934), 2 nominations
    - The Gay Divorcee (1934), 5 nominations
    - Imitation of Life (1934), 3 nominations
    - The White Parade (1934), 2 nominations
    - David Copperfield (1935), 3 nominations
    - Les Misérables (1935), 4 nominations
    - A Midsummer Night's Dream (1935), 4 nominations (note: actually nominated for two, but received two write-in nominations)
    - Naughty Marietta (1935), 2 nominations
    - Top Hat (1935), 4 nominations
    - A Tale of Two Cities (1936), 2 nominations
    - The Adventures of Robin Hood (1938), 4 nominations
    - Of Mice and Men (1939), 4 nominations
    - The Wizard of Oz (1939), 6 nominations
    - King Solomon's Mines (1950), 3 nominations
    - Decision Before Dawn (1951), 2 nominations
    - Ivanhoe (1952), 3 nominations
    - Three Coins in the Fountain (1954), 3 nominations
    - The Music Man (1962), 6 nominations
    - Doctor Dolittle (1967), 9 nominations
    - Hello, Dolly! (1969), 7 nominations
    - Jaws (1975), 4 nominations
    - Beauty and the Beast (1991), 6 nominations
    - The Lord of the Rings: The Two Towers (2002), 6 nominations
    - War Horse (2011), 6 nominations
    - Selma (2014), 2 nominations
    - Black Panther (2018), 7 nominations
    - Ford v Ferrari (2019), 4 nominations
    - Nightmare Alley (2021), 4 nominations
    - Avatar: The Way of Water (2022), 4 nominations
    - Dune: Part Two (2024), 5 nominations
    - F1 (2025), 4 nominations
- Stories made into multiple Best Picture nominees
  - 9 sets of Best Picture nominees share either original source material or were revised versions of the same story (* = winner):
    - Romeo and Juliet (1936), West Side Story (1961)*, Romeo and Juliet (1968), West Side Story (2021)
      - The plot of another Best Picture winner, Shakespeare in Love, revolves around the original production of Romeo and Juliet
    - Mutiny on the Bounty (1935)*, Mutiny on the Bounty (1962)
    - Cleopatra (1934), Cleopatra (1963)
    - Pygmalion (1938), My Fair Lady (1964)*
    - Here Comes Mr. Jordan (1941), Heaven Can Wait (1978)
    - Les Misérables (1935), Les Misérables (2012)
    - A Star Is Born (1937), A Star Is Born (2018)
    - Little Women (1933), Little Women (2019)
    - All Quiet on the Western Front (1929/30)*, All Quiet on the Western Front (2022)
- First Best Picture winner produced wholly by non-Americans
  - Hamlet (1948), United Kingdom
- First Best Picture winner produced wholly by non-Americans or non-British
  - The Artist (2011), France
- First Best Picture winner produced wholly by non-Caucasians
  - Parasite (2019), South Korea
- Most wins by a film produced wholly or partially by non-Americans
  - The Last Emperor (1987), Italy/Hong Kong/United Kingdom, 9 wins
- Most nominations for a film produced wholly or partially by non-Americans
  - Three non-American films have received 13 nominations:
    - Shakespeare in Love (1998), United Kingdom/United States
    - The Lord of the Rings: The Fellowship of the Ring (2001), New Zealand/United States
    - Emilia Pérez (2024), France
- Only animated films to be nominated for Best Picture
  - Beauty and the Beast (1991), Up (2009) and Toy Story 3 (2010)
- Best Picture winners adapted from Best Play or Best Musical Tony Award winners
  - My Fair Lady (1964)
  - The Sound of Music (1965)
  - A Man for All Seasons (1966)
  - Amadeus (1984)
  - Also:
    - All About Eve (1950) was adapted into the musical Applause, which won the Best Musical in 1970.
    - Chicago (2002) was adapted from both the original 1975 musical, which was nominated for Best Musical, and the 1996 revival, which won Best Revival.
    - While the musical Titanic, which won the Best Musical in 1997, and the film Titanic (1997), which won the Best Picture, shared the same name, neither production had anything to do with the other, despite the musical opening the same year as the film's release.
- Best Picture winners based on Pulitzer Prize winning sources
  - You Can't Take It With You (1938) – play
  - Gone with the Wind (1939) – novel
  - All the King's Men (1949) – novel
  - Driving Miss Daisy (1989) – play
  - Spotlight (2015) – public service reporting
    - On the Waterfront (1954) was an original screenplay suggested from Pulitzer-winning newspaper articles.
- Best Picture winners with the highest prize wins from the "Big Three" (Cannes, Venice, and Berlin)
  - The Lost Weekend (1945) – Grand Prix
  - Hamlet (1948) – Golden Lion
  - Marty (1955) – Palme d'Or
  - Rain Man (1988) – Golden Bear
  - The Shape of Water (2017) – Golden Lion
  - Parasite (2019) – Palme d'Or
  - Nomadland (2020) – Golden Lion
  - Anora (2024) – Palme d'Or
- Palme d'Or winning films to be nominated for Best Picture (Best Picture winners designated with ** two asterisks)
  - Marty (1955) **
  - Friendly Persuasion (1956)
  - M*A*S*H (1970)
  - The Conversation (1974)
  - Taxi Driver (1976)
  - Apocalypse Now (1979)
  - All That Jazz (1979)
  - Missing (1982)
  - The Mission (1986)
  - The Piano (1993)
  - Pulp Fiction (1994)
  - Secrets & Lies (1996)
  - The Pianist (2002)
  - The Tree of Life (2011)
  - Amour (2012)
  - Parasite (2019) **
  - Triangle of Sadness (2022)
  - Anatomy of a Fall (2023)
  - Anora (2024) **
- Golden Lion winning films to be nominated for Best Picture (Best Picture winners designated with ** two asterisks)
  - Hamlet (1948) **
  - Atlantic City (1981)
  - Brokeback Mountain (2005)
  - The Shape of Water (2017) **
  - Roma (2018)
  - Joker (2019)
  - Nomadland (2020) **
  - Poor Things (2023)
- Golden Bear winning films to be nominated for Best Picture (Best Picture winners designated with ** two asterisks)
  - 12 Angry Men (1957)
  - Rain Man (1988) **
  - In the Name of the Father (1993)
  - Sense and Sensibility (1995)
  - The Thin Red Line (1998)
- Most acting nominations from a single film
  - Nine films have received a record five acting nominations.
    - Mrs. Miniver (1942)
    - All About Eve (1950)
    - From Here to Eternity (1953)
    - On the Waterfront (1954)
    - Peyton Place (1957)
    - Tom Jones (1963)
    - Bonnie and Clyde (1967)
    - The Godfather Part II (1974)
    - Network (1976)
  - Most nominations for actors (4)
    - On the Waterfront (1954)
    - The Godfather (1972)
    - The Godfather Part II (1974)
  - Most nominations for actresses (4)
    - All About Eve (1950)
- Most acting wins from a single film
  - Three films have received three acting awards:
    - A Streetcar Named Desire (1951)
    - Network (1976)
    - Everything Everywhere All at Once (2022)

== Acting records ==
- Most awards for Best Actress
  - Katharine Hepburn with 4 awards (1933, 1967, 1968, 1981)
- Most awards for Best Actor
  - Daniel Day-Lewis with 3 awards (1989, 2007, 2012)
- Most awards for Best Supporting Actor
  - Walter Brennan with 3 awards (1936, 1938, 1940)
- Most awards for Best Supporting Actress
  - Shelley Winters (1959, 1965) and Dianne Wiest (1986, 1994) with 2 awards each
- Most consecutive Best Actress nominations
  - Two actresses have been nominated for five consecutive years:
    - Bette Davis (1938–1942)
    - Greer Garson (1941–1945)
- Most consecutive Best Actor nominations
  - Marlon Brando with 4 nominations (1951 to 1954)
- Most consecutive Best Supporting Actress nominations
  - Thelma Ritter with 4 nominations (1950 to 1953)
- Most consecutive acting nominations across categories
  - Two actors have been nominated for four consecutive years:
    - Jennifer Jones (1943 Best Actress; 1944 Best Supporting Actress; 1945–1946 Best Actress)
    - Al Pacino (1972 Best Supporting Actor; 1973–1975 Best Actor)
- Actor with most nominations for acting
  - Jack Nicholson with 12 nominations
- Actress with most nominations for acting
  - Meryl Streep with 21 nominations
- Most nominations for an actor without a win
  - Peter O'Toole with 8 nominations (received an Honorary Award in 2002, prior to eighth nomination)
- Most nominations for an actress without a win
  - Glenn Close with 8 nominations
- Most nominations for an actor performing in a non-English language
  - Marcello Mastroianni with 3 nominations: He was nominated for Best Actor for Divorce, Italian Style (1962); A Special Day (1977); and Dark Eyes (1987), performing in Italian
- Longest gap between first and second award
  - Helen Hayes won in 1932 for The Sin of Madelon Claudet and in 1971 for Airport, a 39-year gap.
- Longest gap between first and second nomination
  - Judd Hirsch was nominated in 1981 for Ordinary People and in 2023 for The Fabelmans, a 42-year gap.
  - Amy Madigan was nominated in 1986 for Twice in a Lifetime and in 2026 for Weapons, a 40-year gap; winning for the latter.
- Longest time span between first and last wins
  - Katharine Hepburn won in 1934 for Morning Glory and in 1982 for On Golden Pond, a 48-year gap.
- Longest time span between first and last nomination
  - Robert De Niro was nominated in 1975 for The Godfather Part II (and won); and in 2024 for Killers of the Flower Moon, a 49-year gap.
- Most acting nominations before first win
  - Geraldine Page and Al Pacino, won on their eighth nomination
- Most posthumous nominations
  - James Dean with 2: East of Eden (1955) and Giant (1956)
- Most awards by a Black actor
  - Two Black actors have won two Oscars:
    - Denzel Washington won Best Supporting Actor for Glory (1989) and Best Actor for Training Day (2001)
    - Mahershala Ali won Best Supporting Actor for Moonlight (2016) and for Green Book (2018)
- Most awards for one acting performance
  - Harold Russell played Homer Parrish in The Best Years of Our Lives in 1946. For this role he received two Oscars, one for Best Supporting Actor and an Honorary Oscar "for bringing hope and courage to his fellow veterans through his appearance in The Best Years of Our Lives."
- Most nominations for one acting performance
  - Barry Fitzgerald was nominated as Best Actor and Best Supporting Actor for his role as Father Fitzgibbon in 1944's Going My Way. He won Best Supporting Actor.
- Acting wins for portraying multiple characters in the same film
  - Lee Marvin won for playing Kid Shelleen and Tim Strawn in Cat Ballou (1965)
  - Michael B. Jordan won for playing twins Elijah "Smoke" Moore and Elias "Stack" Moore in Sinners (2025)
- Most roles played in a single film to be nominated for an acting award
  - Peter Sellers was nominated for Best Actor for playing three characters (Lionel Mandrake, President Merkin Muffley and Dr. Strangelove) in Dr. Strangelove (1964)
- Years where all four acting winners were born outside the United States
  - 1964
    - Best Actor – Rex Harrison for My Fair Lady, United Kingdom
    - Best Actress – Julie Andrews for Mary Poppins, United Kingdom
    - Best Supporting Actor – Peter Ustinov for Topkapi, United Kingdom
    - Best Supporting Actress – Lila Kedrova for Zorba the Greek, Russia
  - 2007
    - Best Actor – Daniel Day-Lewis for There Will Be Blood, United Kingdom
    - Best Actress – Marion Cotillard for La Vie en Rose, France
    - Best Supporting Actor – Javier Bardem for No Country for Old Men, Spain
    - Best Supporting Actress – Tilda Swinton for Michael Clayton, United Kingdom
- Actors who won a Tony Award and Academy Award for portraying the same character
  - José Ferrer as Cyrano de Bergerac
    - Best Actor in a Play in 1947 for Cyrano de Bergerac
    - Best Actor in 1950 for Cyrano de Bergerac
  - Shirley Booth as Lola Delaney
    - Best Actress in a Play in 1950 for Come Back, Little Sheba
    - Best Actress in 1952 for Come Back, Little Sheba
  - Yul Brynner as King Mongkut of Siam
    - Best Featured Actor in a Musical in 1952 for The King and I
    - Best Actor in 1956 for The King and I
  - Anne Bancroft as Anne Sullivan
    - Best Actress in a Play in 1960 for The Miracle Worker
    - Best Actress in 1962 for The Miracle Worker
  - Rex Harrison as Henry Higgins
    - Best Actor in a Musical in 1957 for My Fair Lady
    - Best Actor in 1964 for My Fair Lady
  - Paul Scofield as Sir Thomas More
    - Best Actor in a Play in 1962 for A Man for All Seasons
    - Best Actor in 1966 for A Man for All Seasons
  - Jack Albertson as John Cleary
    - Best Featured Actor in a Play in 1965 for The Subject Was Roses
    - Best Supporting Actor in 1968 for The Subject Was Roses
  - Joel Grey as the Master of Ceremonies
    - Best Featured Actor in a Musical in 1967 for Cabaret
    - Best Supporting Actor in 1972 for Cabaret
  - Lila Kedrova as Madame Hortense
    - Best Supporting Actress in 1964 for Zorba the Greek
    - Best Featured Actress in a Musical in 1984 for Zorba
  - Helen Mirren as Queen Elizabeth II
    - Best Actress in 2006 for The Queen
    - Best Actress in a Play in 2015 for The Audience
  - Viola Davis as Rose Maxson
    - Best Actress in a Play in 2010 for Fences
    - Best Supporting Actress in 2016 for Fences
- Acting awards in science fiction, fantasy, superhero, and horror genres
  - Fredric March, 1931, Dr. Jekyll and Mr. Hyde
  - Edmund Gwenn, 1947, Miracle on 34th Street
  - Julie Andrews, 1964, Mary Poppins
  - Ruth Gordon, 1968, Rosemary's Baby
  - Cliff Robertson, 1968, Charly
  - Don Ameche, 1985, Cocoon
  - Kathy Bates, 1990, Misery
  - Jodie Foster, 1991, The Silence of the Lambs
  - Anthony Hopkins, 1991, The Silence of the Lambs
  - Heath Ledger, 2008, The Dark Knight
  - Natalie Portman, 2010, Black Swan
  - Joaquin Phoenix, 2019, Joker
  - Jamie Lee Curtis, 2022, Everything Everywhere All at Once
  - Ke Huy Quan, 2022, Everything Everywhere All at Once
  - Michelle Yeoh, 2022, Everything Everywhere All at Once
  - Emma Stone, 2023, Poor Things
  - Michael B. Jordan, 2025, Sinners
  - Amy Madigan, 2025, Weapons
- Most acting awards for a character
  - Portrayals of Vito Corleone won:
    - Best Actor for Marlon Brando in The Godfather (1972)
    - Best Supporting Actor for Robert De Niro in The Godfather Part II (1974) (in Italian)
  - Portrayals of the Joker won:
    - Best Supporting Actor for Heath Ledger in The Dark Knight (2008)
    - Best Actor for Joaquin Phoenix in Joker (2019) (as origins character, Arthur Fleck)
  - Portrayals of Anita from West Side Story won:
    - Best Supporting Actress for Rita Moreno in the 1961 film adaptation
    - Best Supporting Actress for Ariana DeBose in the 2021 film adaptation
- Most nominations for a character
  - Three portrayals of Queen Elizabeth I of England earned nominations for:
    - Cate Blanchett (2) in Elizabeth (1998) and its sequel Elizabeth: The Golden Age (2007) (both in Best Actress)
    - Judi Dench in Shakespeare in Love (1998) (winner, Best Supporting Actress)
  - Three portrayals of King Henry VIII of England earned nominations for:
    - Charles Laughton in The Private Life of Henry VIII (1933) (winner, Best Actor)
    - Robert Shaw in A Man for All Seasons (1966) (Best Supporting Actor)
    - Richard Burton in Anne of the Thousand Days (1969) (Best Actor)
  - The lead characters of three different versions of A Star Is Born have been nominated:
    - Female leads:
      - 1937: Janet Gaynor as actress Esther Blodgett/Vicki Lester
      - 1954: Judy Garland as actress/singer Esther Blodgett/Vicki Lester
      - 2018: Lady Gaga as singer/musician Ally Campana
    - Male leads:
      - 1937: Fredric March as actor Norman Maine
      - 1954: James Mason as actor Norman Maine
      - 2018: Bradley Cooper as singer/musician Jackson Maine

=== Shortest and longest Academy Award–winning and –nominated performances ===
		Actor		Actress	
Time in h:mm:ss		Shortest	Longest	Shortest	Longest
Lead	Won	David Niven in Separate Tables (1958); 23:39	Adrien Brody in The Brutalist (2024); 2:08:30	Patricia Neal in Hud (1963); 21:51	Vivien Leigh in Gone with the Wind (1939); 2:23:32
Lead	Nominated	Spencer Tracy in San Francisco (1936); 14:58	Denzel Washington in Malcolm X (1992); 2:21:58	Eleanor Parker in Detective Story (1951); 20:10	Vivien Leigh in Gone with the Wind (1939); 2:23:32
Supporting	Won	Ben Johnson in The Last Picture Show (1971); 9:54	Mahershala Ali in Green Book (2018); 1:06:38	Beatrice Straight in Network (1976); 5:02	Tatum O'Neal in Paper Moon (1973); 1:06:58
Supporting	Nominated	Ned Beatty in Network (1976); 6:00	Frank Finlay in Othello (1965); 1:30:43	Hermione Baddeley in Room at the Top (1959); 2:19	Jennifer Jones in Since You Went Away (1944); 1:15:38

== Miscellaneous records ==
- Most films nominated for and won in a single category
  - 1942, with 24 films nominated for Best Documentary Feature Film and 4 winners (Shorts and features competed in a single category)
- Most losses by a single film: 12
  - Sinners (2025), with 16 nominations and four wins (Best Actor, Best Original Screenplay, Best Cinematography and Best Original Score)
- Person nominated in the most decades
  - John Williams:
    - 1960s: 1967, 1969 (2 nominations)
    - 1970s: 1971, 1972 (2 nominations), 1973 (3 nominations), 1974, 1975, 1977 (2 nominations), 1978
    - 1980s: 1980, 1981, 1982 (2 nominations), 1983, 1984 (2 nominations), 1987 (2 nominations), 1988, 1989 (2 nominations)
    - 1990s: 1990 (2 nominations), 1991 (2 nominations), 1993, 1995 (3 nominations), 1996, 1997, 1998, 1999
    - 2000s: 2000, 2001 (2 nominations), 2002, 2004, 2005 (2 nominations)
    - 2010s: 2011 (2 nominations), 2012, 2013, 2015, 2017, 2019
    - 2020s: 2022, 2023
- People who won both a Nobel Prize and an Oscar
  - George Bernard Shaw: Won the Nobel Prize in Literature in 1925, and an Oscar for Best Adapted Screenplay for the film Pygmalion in 1938
  - Bob Dylan: Won an Oscar for Best Original Song for the song "Things Have Changed" from Wonder Boys in 2000, and the Nobel Prize in Literature in 2016
- Only person to win both a Booker Prize and an Oscar
  - Ruth Prawer Jhabvala: Won the Booker Prize for Heat and Dust in 1975, and two Oscars for Best Adapted Screenplay for the films A Room with a View in 1986 and Howards End in 1992
- People who won both a Pulitzer Prize and an Oscar
  - Mstyslav Chernov: Won an Oscar for Best Documentary Feature Film for the film 20 Days in Mariupol in 2023, and the Pulitzer Prize for Public Service in 2023
  - Aaron Copland: Won an Oscar for Best Original Score for the film The Heiress in 1949, and the Pulitzer Prize for Music in 1945
  - John Corigliano: Won an Oscar for Best Original Score for the film The Red Violin in 1999, and the Pulitzer Prize for Music in 2001
  - Bob Dylan: Won an Oscar for Best Original Song for the song "Things Have Changed" from Wonder Boys in 2000, and an additional citation in the Pulitzer Prize for Music in 2006
  - Horton Foote: Won two Oscars; Best Adapted Screenplay for the film To Kill a Mockingbird in 1962, and Best Original Screenplay for the film Tender Mercies in 1983, and the Pulitzer Prize for Drama in 1995
  - Marvin Hamlisch: Won three Oscars in 1973; Best Score-Adaptation or Treatment for the film The Sting, and Best Original Score and Best Original Song for the title song of the film The Way We Were, and the Pulitzer Prize for Drama in 1976
  - Oscar Hammerstein II: Won two Oscars; Best Original Song for the songs "The Last Time I Saw Paris" from the film Lady Be Good in 1941, and "It Might as Well Be Spring" from the film State Fair in 1945, and the Pulitzer Prize for Drama in 1950, along with an additional citation in 1943
  - Sidney Howard: Posthumously won an Oscar for Best Adapted Screenplay for the film Gone With the Wind in 1939, and the Pulitzer Prize for Drama in 1925
  - William Inge: Won an Oscar for Best Original Screenplay for the film Splendor in the Grass in 1961, and the Pulitzer Prize for Drama in 1953
  - Frank Loesser: Won an Oscar for Best Original Song for the song "Baby, It's Cold Outside" from the film Neptune's Daughter in 1949, and the Pulitzer Prize for Drama in 1962
  - Larry McMurtry: Won an Oscar for Best Adapted Screenplay for the film Brokeback Mountain in 2005, and the Pulitzer Prize for Fiction for his novel Lonesome Dove in 1985
  - Richard Rodgers: Won an Oscar for Best Original Song for the song "It Might as Well Be Spring" from the film State Fair in 1945, and the Pulitzer Prize for Drama in 1950, along with an additional citation in 1943
  - William Saroyan: Won an Oscar for Best Story, Screenplay for the film The Human Comedy in 1943, and the Pulitzer Prize for Drama in 1940
  - John Patrick Shanley: Won an Oscar for Best Original Screenplay for the film Moonstruck in 1987, and the Pulitzer Prize for Drama in 2005
  - Robert E. Sherwood: Won an Oscar for Best Adapted Screenplay for the film The Best Years of Our Lives in 1946, and the Pulitzer Prize for Drama in 1936, 1939, and 1941, and the Pulitzer Prize for Biography or Autobiography in 1949
  - Stephen Sondheim: Won an Oscar for Best Original Song for the song "Sooner or Later (I Always Get My Man)" from the film Dick Tracy in 1990, and the Pulitzer Prize for Drama in 1985
  - Alfred Uhry: Won an Oscar for Best Adapted Screenplay for the film Driving Miss Daisy in 1989, and the Pulitzer Prize for Drama for the stage version in 1988
- Only person to win both an Olympic medal and an Oscar
  - Kobe Bryant: Won gold medals in Basketball in 2008 and 2012, and an Oscar for Best Animated Short Film in 2017 for the film Dear Basketball
- Only person to win for Acting and Songwriting
  - Barbra Streisand won Best Actress for Funny Girl (1968) and Best Original Song for "Evergreen", the love theme from the film A Star Is Born (1976).
- Only person to win for Acting and Writing
  - Emma Thompson won Best Actress for Howards End (1992) and Best Adapted Screenplay for the film Sense and Sensibility (1995).
- Only person to win for Acting and Directing
  - To date, technically no one has. However Lee Grant won for Best Supporting Actress for Shampoo (1975) and she directed the Best Documentary Feature, Down and Out in America (1986), but under the Academy rules at the time, only producers were eligible to win the award, so the award went to her producer husband and another co-producer. Under the present rules, the director would now be recognized with the Oscar.
- Only person to win for Directing, Editing, and Writing
  - Sean Baker won Best Director, Best Original Screenplay, and Best Editing for Anora (2024); as an Anora producer, he also received an Oscar for Best Picture.
- Only person nominated for Acting, Writing, Producing, and Directing for the same film
  - Warren Beatty was nominated in the four categories for Heaven Can Wait (1978), and again for Reds (1981).
    - Citizen Kane was nominated in the four categories, but at the time, the studio rather than the individual producer was eligible for the Best Picture award, meaning that writer/director/producer/actor Orson Welles was not nominated as a producer.
- Only person to win for Directing, Editing, Producing, and Writing for the same film
  - Sean Baker for Anora (2024), which also makes him the only person to win four Academy Awards in one night for the same film.
- Only person to receive every nomination in a category
  - Stephen Bosustow received all three nominations for Short Subjects, Cartoons in 1956, winning for Magoo's Puddle Jumper.
- Only actor to win an Oscar for portraying a real Oscar winner
  - Cate Blanchett won Best Supporting Actress for portraying Katharine Hepburn in The Aviator (2004).
    - Note: Renée Zellweger won Best Actress for portraying Judy Garland in Judy (2019). Garland received the Academy Juvenile Award, an honorary award, but never won a competitive Oscar.
- Only actor to win an Oscar for portraying a fictional Oscar nominee
  - Maggie Smith won Best Supporting Actress for playing an Oscar loser in California Suite (1978).
- Only actor to appear in multiple films with the most Oscar wins
  - Bernard Hill had supporting roles in Titanic (1997) and The Lord of the Rings: The Return of the King (2003), with 11 Oscars each.
- Only actor to win multiple Oscars for portraying Holocaust survivors: Adrien Brody (2)
  - Polish pianist Władysław Szpilman in Roman Polanski's war drama The Pianist (2002), based on Szpilman.
  - Hungarian brutalist architect László Tóth in Brady Corbet's period epic The Brutalist (2024), partially inspired by Marcel Breuer. (Note: Breuer is said to have not been a Holocaust survivor because he moved to the United States in 1937, prior to the beginning of World War II in 1939.)
- Most total nominations without a win
  - One person has received 17 nominations and no competitive wins:
    - Diane Warren in the Best Original Song category, including nine consecutive nominations from 2017 to 2025 (She received a Academy Honorary Award in 2022)
    - Greg P. Russell has received 16 nominations in the Best Sound Mixing category, not including his nomination at the 89th Academy Awards for 13 Hours: The Secret Soldiers of Benghazi, which was revoked the day before the ceremony
- Most total nominations before receiving an award
  - Film composer Victor Young was nominated 21 times without winning. He was often nominated multiple times in one year; twice, he was nominated four times at the same Oscars. He won posthumously for Around the World in 80 Days (1956).
    - Sound re-recording mixer Kevin O'Connell comes in at a close second, with 20 unsuccessful nominations from 1983 until 2016, when he finally won for Hacksaw Ridge.
- Most nominations for a living person
  - Film composer John Williams with 54
- Only write-in nominee to win a competitive award
  - Cinematographer Hal Mohr for A Midsummer Night's Dream (1935)
- Most categories to have been nominated in
  - Kenneth Branagh: 8 nominations in 7 categories, winning once
    - Best Picture
    - Best Director
    - Best Original Screenplay
    - Best Adapted Screenplay
    - Best Actor
    - Best Supporting Actor
    - Best Live Action Short Film
  - Alfonso Cuarón: 11 nominations in 7 categories, winning four
    - Best Picture
    - Best Director
    - Best Original Screenplay
    - Best Adapted Screenplay
    - Best Film Editing
    - Best Cinematography
    - Best Live Action Short Film
    - Note: Cuarón's film Roma also won Best International Feature Film, but as the category is awarded to the country rather than the producer or director, this does not count towards his wins and nominations.
- Most nominated woman
  - Costume designer Edith Head with 35
- Highest "perfect score"
  - The record is 4 nominations and 4 wins, shared by sound editor Mark Berger, visual effects supervisor Paul Lambert and filmmaker Sean Baker.
- Most nominations for directing
  - William Wyler with 12 nominations
- Most nominations for directing without an award
  - All received 5 nominations
    - Robert Altman
    - Clarence Brown
    - Alfred Hitchcock
    - King Vidor
- Only films to win Best Director and nothing else
  - Two Arabian Knights (1927) – Lewis Milestone (Note: only nomination as well)
  - The Divine Lady (1928) – Frank Lloyd
  - Skippy (1931) – Norman Taurog
  - Mr Deeds Goes to Town (1936) – Frank Capra
  - The Awful Truth (1937) – Leo McCarey
  - Giant (1956) – George Stevens
  - The Graduate (1967) – Mike Nichols
  - The Power of the Dog (2021) – Jane Campion
- Most wins for producing
  - Two producers received 3 awards:
    - Sam Spiegel
    - Saul Zaentz
- Most nominations for producing
  - Steven Spielberg with 14 nominations
- Most nominations for directing in a single year
  - Two people have received two nominations for Best Director in the same year:
    - Michael Curtiz for Angels with Dirty Faces and Four Daughters in 1938
    - Steven Soderbergh for Erin Brockovich and Traffic in 2000
- Most nominations for writing in a single year
  - Five people have received two nominations for writing in the same year (all for Best Original Screenplay):
    - Frank Butler for Road to Morocco and Wake Island (with different co-writers) in 1942
    - Preston Sturges for Hail the Conquering Hero and The Miracle of Morgan's Creek in 1944
    - Maurice Richlin & Stanley Shapiro for Operation Petticoat and Pillow Talk in 1959
    - Oliver Stone for Platoon and Salvador in 1986
- Most Best Picture awards for a film franchise
  - The Godfather trilogy with 2 (for The Godfather and The Godfather Part II)
- Other Best Picture awards for a film franchise
  - The Rocky franchise: Rocky (1976)
  - Hannibal Lecter franchise: The Silence of the Lambs (1991)
  - The Middle-earth franchise: The Lord of the Rings: The Return of the King (2003)
- Film franchises with multiple Best Picture nominations
  - The Godfather trilogy with 3 nominations for The Godfather, The Godfather Part II, and The Godfather Part III
  - The Middle-earth franchise with 3 nominations for The Lord of the Rings: The Fellowship of the Ring, The Lord of the Rings: The Two Towers, and The Lord of the Rings: The Return of the King
  - Avatar franchise with 2 nominations for Avatar and Avatar: The Way of Water
  - Dune franchise with 2 nominations for Dune and Dune: Part Two
- Most nominations for a film franchise
  - Star Wars with 38 nominations
- Most wins for a film series
  - The Middle-earth franchise with 17 competitive wins out of 37 nominations (for The Lord of the Rings and The Hobbit)
- Most nominations for Best Original Screenplay
  - Woody Allen with 16 nominations and 3 wins
- Longest time span between the release of a film and winning an Oscar
  - Limelight (1952) is the only film to have won an award twenty years after its official release. Since it was not released in Los Angeles County until 1972, it was not eligible for any Academy Awards until that time
- Most posthumous award wins
  - William A. Horning won in 1958 for Best Art Direction for Gigi, and for Best Art Direction for Ben-Hur in 1959
- Most posthumous award nominations
  - Howard Ashman with four, all for Best Original Song
- Longest time span between a winner's death and his award
  - Larry Russell, who died in February 1954, won Best Original Score for Limelight (1952) in 1973, 19 years after his death
- Highest-grossing film to win Best Picture
  - Titanic with $2,257,906,828
- Highest-grossing film to be nominated for Best Picture
  - Avatar with $2,923,710,708
- Highest-grossing R-rated film to win Best Picture
  - Oppenheimer with $975,594,978
- Highest-grossing R-rated film to be nominated for Best Picture
  - Joker with $1,074,458,282
- Lowest-grossing film to win Best Picture
  - CODA with $1,905,058
- Lowest-grossing film to be nominated for Best Picture
  - Mank with $100,072
- Lowest-grossing R-rated film to win Best Picture
  - Nomadland with $39,458,207
- Films to gross over $2 billion to be nominated for Best Picture
  - Avatar
  - Avatar: The Way of Water
  - Titanic
- Films to gross over $1 billion to be nominated for Best Picture
  - Avatar
  - Avatar: The Way of Water
  - Barbie
  - Black Panther
  - Joker
  - The Lord of the Rings: The Return of the King
  - Titanic
  - Top Gun: Maverick
  - Toy Story 3
- Longest film to win Best Picture
  - Gone with the Wind, 224 minutes (238 with overture, entr'acte, and exit music)
- Longest film to be nominated for Best Picture
  - Cleopatra, 251 minutes
- Longest film to win an award
  - O.J.: Made in America (2016), 467 minutes (Best Documentary Feature)
  - The longest fictional film to win an award was War and Peace (1968), 431 minutes (Best Foreign Language Film)
- Shortest film to win Best Picture
  - Marty, 90 minutes
- Shortest film to be nominated for Best Picture
  - She Done Him Wrong, 66 minutes
- Shortest film to win an award
  - The Crunch Bird, 2 minutes (Best Animated Short Film)
- Shortest film to be nominated for an award
  - Fresh Guacamole, 100 seconds (Best Animated Short Film)
- Most royalty and leaders portrayed
  - 49 portrayals of monarchs or civil leaders (real and fictional), have been nominated for acting awards, with 11 winners
  - The United Kingdom is the most represented nation
    - Overall, there have been 16 nominations and 5 wins for portrayals of British monarchs
      - In addition, two portrayals of Scottish monarchs have been nominated
    - Three portrayals of British Prime Ministers have been nominated, with 3 wins
  - Portrayals of four French kings and Emperor Napoleon have received nominations
  - The only portrayal of a non-British monarch to win an award was Yul Brynner as King Mongkut of Siam in The King and I
  - 12 portrayals of presidents of the United States (three of them fictional) have been nominated, with Daniel Day-Lewis's portrayal of Abraham Lincoln in Lincoln being the only winner
  - Two portrayals of popes (the head of state for Vatican City) have been nominated, both from the film The Two Popes
  - 12 portrayals of spouses/consorts of leaders have been nominated, with Katharine Hepburn's Eleanor of Aquitaine in The Lion in Winter being the only winner
  - Three portrayals of dictators have been nominated:
    - Forest Whitaker won for his portrayal of Idi Amin in The Last King of Scotland
    - Charlie Chaplin and Jack Oakie were nominated for their respective turns as the dictators of Tomainia and Bacteria in The Great Dictator
- Most Honorary Awards
  - Bob Hope received five honorary awards, two Special, two Honorary, and the Jean Hersholt Humanitarian Award
- Tallest Oscar winner/nominee
  - Florian Henckel von Donnersmarck (2.05m/6 ft 9in) – Best International Feature Film (The Lives of Others)
- Shortest Oscar winner
  - Linda Hunt (1.45m/4 ft 9in) – Best Supporting Actress (The Year of Living Dangerously)
- Shortest Oscar nominee
  - Michael Dunn (1.17m/3 ft 10in) – Best Supporting Actor (Ship of Fools)
- Actors who appeared in the most Best Picture nominated films
  - Two actors have appeared in 12 Best Picture nominated films in their career:
    - Robert De Niro
      - 11 credited, 1 uncredited (American Hustle)
    - Leonardo DiCaprio
- Actors who appeared in the most Best Picture nominated films in a single year
  - 11 actors have appeared in three Best Picture nominated films in a single year:
    - Out of 5 nominees:
      - John C. Reilly (2002): Chicago, The Hours, Gangs of New York
    - Out of 9 nominees:
      - Michael Stuhlbarg (2017): Call Me by Your Name, The Post, The Shape of Water
    - Out of 10 nominees:
      - Jessie Ralph (1935): Captain Blood, David Copperfield, Les Miserables
      - Charles Laughton (1935): Les Miserables, Mutiny on the Bounty, Ruggles of Red Gap
      - Ivan F. Simpson (1935): Captain Blood, David Copperfield, Mutiny on the Bounty
      - Donald Woods (1936): Anthony Adverse, The Story of Louis Pasteur, A Tale of Two Cities
      - Fritz Leiber (1936): Anthony Adverse, The Story of Louis Pasteur, A Tale of Two Cities
      - Adolphe Menjou (1937): One Hundred Men and a Girl, Stage Door, A Star Is Born
      - Thomas Mitchell (1939): Gone With the Wind, Mr. Smith Goes to Washington, Stagecoach
      - Edward Fielding (1940): All This, Kitty Foyle, Rebecca
      - Henry Daniell (1940): All This, The Great Dictator, The Philadelphia Story
      - Douglas Croft (1942) Kings Row, The Pride of the Yankees, Yankee Doodle Dandy
    - Out of 12 nominees:
      - Claudette Colbert (1934) Cleopatra, Imitation of Life, It Happened One Night
- First nominated Original Song with profanity in lyrics
  - "Mean Green Mother from Outer Space" (1986) from Little Shop of Horrors, music by Alan Menken, lyrics by Howard Ashman
- First nominated Original Song sung by a villain character
  - "Mean Green Mother from Outer Space" (1986) from Little Shop of Horrors, performed by Levi Stubbs as Audrey II
    - *Note: The song was performed at the 1987 Academy Awards with the profanity omitted. It was also the first time a villain character performed live at the ceremony.
- Only directors to have directed wins in all four acting categories
  - William Wyler
    - Best Actor: Fredric March in The Best Years of Our Lives (1946), Charlton Heston in Ben-Hur (1959)
    - Best Actress: Bette Davis in Jezebel (1938), Olivia de Havilland in The Heiress (1949), Audrey Hepburn in Roman Holiday (1953), Greer Garson in Mrs. Miniver (1954), Barbra Streisand in Funny Girl (1968).
    - Best Supporting Actor: Walter Brennan in Come and Get It (1936), Walter Brennan in The Westerner (1940), Harold Russell in The Best Years of Our Lives (1946), Burl Ives in The Big Country (1958), Hugh Griffith in Ben-Hur (1959)
    - Best Supporting Actress: Fay Bainter in Jezebel (1938), Teresa Wright in Mrs. Miniver (1954)
  - Elia Kazan
    - Best Actor: Marlon Brando in On the Waterfront (1954)
    - Best Actress: Vivien Leigh in A Streetcar Named Desire (1951)
    - Best Supporting Actor: James Dunn in A Tree Grows in Brooklyn (1945), Karl Malden in A Streetcar Named Desire (1951), Anthony Quinn in Viva Zapata! (1952),
    - Best Supporting Actress: Celeste Holm in Gentleman's Agreement (1947), Kim Hunter in A Streetcar Named Desire (1951), Eva Marie Saint in On the Waterfront (1954), Jo Van Fleet in East of Eden (1955)
  - Martin Scorsese
    - Best Actor: Robert De Niro in Raging Bull (1980), Paul Newman in The Color of Money (1986)
    - Best Actress: Ellen Burstyn in Alice Doesn't Live Here Anymore (1974)
    - Best Supporting Actor: Joe Pesci in Goodfellas (1990)
    - Best Supporting Actress: Cate Blanchett in The Aviator (2004)
  - Hal Ashby
    - Best Actor: Jon Voight in Coming Home (1979)
    - Best Actress: Jane Fonda in Coming Home (1979)
    - Best Supporting Actor: Melvyn Douglas in Being There (1980)
    - Best Supporting Actress: Lee Grant in Shampoo (1976)

== Oscar speeches ==
- Longest speech
  - Adrien Brody spoke for 5 minutes and 40 seconds while accepting Best Actor for The Brutalist at the 97th Academy Awards in 2025. Prior to that, the longest Oscar speech was given by Greer Garson, who spoke for 5 minutes and 30 seconds at the 15th Academy Awards after she was named Best Actress for 1942 for Mrs. Miniver. It was shortly after this incident that the academy set forty-five seconds as the allotted time for an acceptance speech and began to cut the winners off after this time limit. When presenting the Best Actor award at the 24th Academy Awards, Garson quipped, "I think I have ten minutes left over from a highly emotional speech I made a few years ago. I'd be glad to give it to them."
- Shortest speech
  - The shortest Oscar speech was that given by Patty Duke at the 35th Academy Awards after she was named Best Supporting Actress for 1962 for The Miracle Worker. Duke, age 16, was the youngest person at that time to receive an Oscar in a competitive category. Her acceptance speech was two words, "Thank you", after which she walked off the stage.

== Tied winners ==
There have been seven two-way ties.

- 1931/32: Best Actor – Wallace Beery (The Champ) and Fredric March (Dr. Jekyll and Mr. Hyde)
- 1949: Best Documentary Short – A Chance to Live and So Much for So Little
- 1968: Best Actress – Katharine Hepburn (The Lion in Winter) and Barbra Streisand (Funny Girl)
- 1986: Best Documentary – Artie Shaw: Time Is All You've Got and Down and Out in America
- 1994: Best Short Film (Live Action)– Franz Kafka's It's a Wonderful Life and Trevor
- 2012: Best Sound Editing – Paul N. J. Ottosson (Zero Dark Thirty) and Per Hallberg & Karen Baker Landers (Skyfall)
- 2025: Best Short Film (Live Action) – The Singers and Two People Exchanging Saliva

== Clean sweep ==
The following films with at least two nominations won all of their categories.

- 1927/1928: Wings (2)
  - Outstanding Picture: Paramount Pictures
  - Best Engineering Effects: Roy Pomeroy
- 1934: It Happened One Night (5)
  - Outstanding Production: Frank Capra and Harry Cohn
  - Best Director: Frank Capra
  - Best Actor: Clark Gable
  - Best Actress: Claudette Colbert
  - Best Adaptation: Robert Riskin
- 1940: Pinocchio (2)
  - Best Original Score: Leigh Harline, Paul Smith and Ned Washington
  - Best Song: Leigh Harline and Ned Washington ("When You Wish Upon a Star")
- 1947: Black Narcissus (2)
  - Best Cinematography (Color): Jack Cardiff
  - Best Art Direction (Color): Alfred Junge (Art Direction and Set Decoration)
- 1958: Gigi (9)
  - Best Motion Picture: Arthur Freed
  - Best Director: Vincente Minnelli
  - Best Screenplay Based on Material from Another Medium: Alan Jay Lerner
  - Best Cinematography (Color): Joseph Ruttenberg
  - Best Costume Design: Cecil Beaton
  - Best Film Editing: Adrienne Fazan
  - Best Scoring of a Musical Picture: André Previn
  - Best Song: Frederick Loewe and Alan Jay Lerner ("Gigi")
  - Best Art Direction: William A. Horning and E. Preston Ames (Art Direction) / Henry Grace and F. Keogh Gleason (Set Decoration)
- 1966: Born Free (2)
  - Best Original Music Score: John Barry
  - Best Song: John Barry and Don Black ("Born Free")
- 1966: Grand Prix (3)
  - Best Film Editing: Fredric Steinkamp, Henry Berman, Stu Linder and Frank Santillo
  - Best Sound Effects: Gordon Daniel
  - Best Sound: Franklin Milton
- 1971: Sentinels of Silence (2)
  - Best Documentary Short Subject: Robert Amram and Manuel Arango
  - Best Live Action Short Subject: Robert Amram and Manuel Arango
- 1974: The Great Gatsby (2)
  - Best Costume Design: Theoni V. Aldredge
  - Best Scoring: Original Song Score and Adaptation or Scoring: Adaptation: Nelson Riddle
- 1985: Cocoon (2)
  - Best Supporting Actor: Don Ameche
  - Best Visual Effects: Ken Ralston, Ralph McQuarrie, Scott Farrar and David Berry
- 1987: The Last Emperor (9)
  - Best Picture: Jeremy Thomas
  - Best Director: Bernardo Bertolucci
  - Best Screenplay Based on Material from Another Medium: Bernardo Bertolucci and Mark Peploe
  - Best Cinematography: Vittorio Storaro
  - Best Costume Design: James Acheson
  - Best Film Editing: Gabriella Cristiani
  - Best Original Score: Ryuichi Sakamoto, David Byrne and Cong Su
  - Best Art Direction: Ferdinando Scarfiotti (Art Direction) / Bruno Cesari and Osvaldo Desideri (Set Decoration)
  - Best Sound: Bill Rowe and Ivan Sharrock
- 1989: The Little Mermaid (2)
  - Best Original Score: Alan Menken
  - Best Original Song: Alan Menken and Howard Ashman ("Under the Sea")
- 1993: Jurassic Park (3)
  - Best Sound Effects Editing: Gary Rydstrom and Richard Hymns
  - Best Sound: Gary Rydstrom, Gary Summers, Ron Judkins and Shawn Murphy
  - Best Visual Effects: Dennis Muren, Stan Winston, Phil Tippett and Michael Lantieri
- 1994: Ed Wood (2)
  - Best Supporting Actor: Martin Landau
  - Best Makeup: Rick Baker, Ve Neill and Yolanda Toussieng
- 1994: The Lion King (2)
  - Best Original Score: Hans Zimmer
  - Best Original Song: Elton John and Tim Rice ("Can You Feel the Love Tonight")
- 1995: Pocahontas (2)
  - Best Original Musical or Comedy Score: Alan Menken and Stephen Schwartz
  - Best Original Song: Alan Menken and Stephen Schwartz ("Colors of the Wind")
- 1995: Restoration (2)
  - Best Costume Design: James Acheson
  - Best Art Direction: Eugenio Zanetti (Art Direction and Set Decoration)
- 1995: The Usual Suspects (2)
  - Best Supporting Actor: Kevin Spacey
  - Best Screenplay Written Directly for the Screen: Christopher McQuarrie
- 1999: The Matrix (4)
  - Best Film Editing: Zach Staenberg
  - Best Sound Effects Editing: Dane Davis
  - Best Sound: John T. Reitz, Gregg Rudloff, David E. Campbell and David Lee
  - Best Visual Effects: John Gaeta, Janek Sirrs, Steve Courtley and Jon Thum
- 2003: The Lord of the Rings: The Return of the King (11)
  - Best Picture: Peter Jackson, Fran Walsh and Barrie M. Osborne
  - Best Director: Peter Jackson
  - Best Adapted Screenplay: Fran Walsh, Peter Jackson and Philippa Boyens
  - Best Costume Design: Ngila Dickson and Richard Taylor
  - Best Film Editing: Jamie Selkirk
  - Best Makeup: Peter King and Richard Taylor
  - Best Original Score: Howard Shore
  - Best Original Song: Howard Shore, Fran Walsh and Annie Lennox ("Into the West")
  - Best Art Direction: Grant Major (Art Direction) / Dan Hennah and Alan Lee (Set Decoration)
  - Best Sound Mixing: Christopher Boyes, Hammond Peek, Michael Hedges and Michael Semanick
  - Best Visual Effects: Jim Rygiel, Joe Letteri, Randall William Cook and Alex Funke
- 2006: An Inconvenient Truth (2)
  - Best Documentary Feature Film: Davis Guggenheim
  - Best Original Song: Melissa Etheridge ("I Need to Wake Up")
- 2007: The Bourne Ultimatum (3)
  - Best Film Editing: Christopher Rouse
  - Best Sound Editing: Karen Baker Landers and Per Hallberg
  - Best Sound Mixing: Scott Millan, Kirk Francis and David Parker
- 2011: The Iron Lady (2)
  - Best Actress: Meryl Streep
  - Best Makeup: Mark Coulier and J. Roy Helland
- 2013: Frozen (2)
  - Best Animated Feature Film: Chris Buck, Jennifer Lee and Peter Del Vecho
  - Best Original Song: Kristen Anderson-Lopez and Robert Lopez ("Let It Go")
- 2013: The Great Gatsby (2)
  - Best Costume Design: Catherine Martin
  - Best Production Design: Catherine Martin (Production Design) / Beverley Dunn (Set Decoration)
- 2017: Coco (2)
  - Best Animated Feature Film: Lee Unkrich and Darla K. Anderson
  - Best Original Song: Kristen Anderson-Lopez and Robert Lopez ("Remember Me")
- 2021: CODA (3)
  - Best Picture: Fabrice Gianfermi, Philippe Rousselet and Patrick Wachsberger
  - Best Supporting Actor: Troy Kotsur
  - Best Adapted Screenplay: Sian Heder
- 2021: The Eyes of Tammy Faye (2)
  - Best Actress: Jessica Chastain
  - Best Makeup and Hairstyling: Linda Dowds, Stephanie Ingram and Justin Raleigh
- 2025: KPop Demon Hunters (2)
  - Best Animated Feature Film: Maggie Kang, Chris Appelhans, and Michelle L.M. Wong
  - Best Original Song: Ejae, Mark Sonnenblick, 24, Ido, and Teddy Park ("Golden")

== See also ==
- List of Academy Award–winning films
- List of Academy Award–winning families
- List of Academy Awards for Walt Disney
- List of actors with more than one Academy Award nomination in the acting categories
- List of actors nominated for Academy Awards for non-English performances
- List of black Academy Award winners and nominees
- List of Big Five Academy Award winners and nominees
- List of Academy Award nominees presented under false names
- List of films with all four Academy Award acting category nominations
- List of films with the most Academy Awards per ceremony
- List of oldest and youngest Academy Award winners and nominees
- List of EGOT winners
- List of people who have won multiple Academy Awards in a single year
- List of posthumous Academy Award winners and nominees
- List of superlative Academy Award winners and nominees
- List of Generation Z Academy Award winners and nominees
- List of Millennial Academy Award winners and nominees
- Little Golden Guy
