= List of films with the most Academy Awards per ceremony =

This is a list of films receiving the most Academy Awards at each awards ceremony. This also contains a list of films receiving the most Academy Award nominations at each awards ceremony.

This information is current as of the 97th Academy Awards ceremony, held on March 2, 2025, which honored the best films of 2024.

== List of films receiving the most Academy Awards per ceremony ==
Academy Awards Season		Film Title	Best Picture		Awards (Note: This column includes competitive awards (i.e., Academy Awards of Merit) only. It does not include the following: Honorary Awards; Special Awards; Special Achievement Awards; and Scientific or Technical Awards.)	Nominations	Notes
Ceremony	Year in Film	Film Title	Winner	Nominee	Awards	Nominations	Notes
1st	1927–1928	7th Heaven		✓	3	5	
1st	1927–1928	Sunrise			3	4	(Note: At the 1st Academy Awards (1927–1928), Wings won the Academy Award for Outstanding Picture (now known as Best Picture), while Sunrise won the Academy Award for Unique and Artistic Picture. At the time, these two categories were seen as equally the top award of the night, intended to honor different and equally important aspects of superior film-making. The following year, however, at the 2nd Academy Awards (1928–1929), the Academy discontinued the Unique and Artistic Picture award and decided retroactively that the Outstanding Picture award won by Wings was the highest honor that could be awarded.)
2nd	1928–1929	The Bridge of San Luis Rey			1	1	
2nd	1928–1929	The Broadway Melody	✓	✓	1	3	
2nd	1928–1929	Coquette			1	1	
2nd	1928–1929	The Divine Lady			1	3	
2nd	1928–1929	In Old Arizona		✓	1	5	
2nd	1928–1929	The Patriot		✓	1	5	
2nd	1928–1929	White Shadows in the South Seas			1	1	
3rd	1929–1930	All Quiet on the Western Front	✓	✓	2	4	
3rd	1929–1930	The Big House		✓	2	4	
4th	1930–1931	Cimarron	✓	✓	3	7	
5th	1931–1932	Bad Girl		✓	2	3	
5th	1931–1932	The Champ		✓	2	4	
6th	1932–1933	Cavalcade	✓	✓	3	4	
7th	1934	It Happened One Night	✓	✓	5	5	
8th	1935	The Informer		✓	4	6	
9th	1936	Anthony Adverse		✓	4	7	
10th	1937	The Life of Emile Zola	✓	✓	3	10	
11th	1938	The Adventures of Robin Hood		✓	3	4	
12th	1939	Gone with the Wind	✓	✓	8	13	(Note: Gone with the Wind received 8 competitive Academy Awards of Merit. In addition, the film received a Special Award and a Scientific or Technical Award (Class III).)
13th	1940	The Thief of Bagdad			3	4	
14th	1941	How Green Was My Valley	✓	✓	5	10	
15th	1942	Mrs. Miniver	✓	✓	6	12	
16th	1943	The Song of Bernadette		✓	4	12	
17th	1944	Going My Way	✓	✓	7	10	
18th	1945	The Lost Weekend	✓	✓	4	7	
19th	1946	The Best Years of Our Lives	✓	✓	7	8	(Note: The Best Years of Our Lives received 7 competitive Academy Awards of Merit. In addition, the film received a Special Award.)
20th	1947	Gentleman's Agreement	✓	✓	3	8	
20th	1947	Miracle on 34th Street		✓	3	4	
21st	1948	Hamlet	✓	✓	4	7	
22nd	1949	The Heiress		✓	4	8	
23rd	1950	All About Eve	✓	✓	6	14	
24th	1951	An American in Paris	✓	✓	6	8	
24th	1951	A Place in the Sun		✓	6	9	
25th	1952	The Bad and the Beautiful			5	6	
26th	1953	From Here to Eternity	✓	✓	8	13	
27th	1954	On the Waterfront	✓	✓	8	12	
28th	1955	Marty	✓	✓	4	8	
29th	1956	Around the World in 80 Days	✓	✓	5	8	
29th	1956	The King and I		✓	5	9	
30th	1957	The Bridge on the River Kwai	✓	✓	7	8	
31st	1958	Gigi	✓	✓	9	9	
32nd	1959	Ben-Hur	✓	✓	11	12	
33rd	1960	The Apartment	✓	✓	5	10	
34th	1961	West Side Story	✓	✓	10	11	
35th	1962	Lawrence of Arabia	✓	✓	7	10	
36th	1963	Cleopatra		✓	4	9	
36th	1963	Tom Jones	✓	✓	4	10	
37th	1964	My Fair Lady	✓	✓	8	12	
38th	1965	Doctor Zhivago		✓	5	10	
38th	1965	The Sound of Music	✓	✓	5	10	
39th	1966	A Man for All Seasons	✓	✓	6	8	
40th	1967	In the Heat of the Night	✓	✓	5	7	
41st	1968	Oliver!	✓	✓	5	11	(Note: Oliver! received 5 competitive Academy Awards of Merit. In addition, the film received an Honorary Award.)
42nd	1969	Butch Cassidy and the Sundance Kid		✓	4	7	
43rd	1970	Patton	✓	✓	7	10	
44th	1971	The French Connection	✓	✓	5	8	
45th	1972	Cabaret		✓	8	10	
46th	1973	The Sting	✓	✓	7	10	
47th	1974	The Godfather Part II	✓	✓	6	11	
48th	1975	One Flew Over the Cuckoo's Nest	✓	✓	5	9	
49th	1976	All the President's Men		✓	4	8	
49th	1976	Network		✓	4	10	
50th	1977	Star Wars		✓	6	10	(Note: Star Wars received 6 competitive Academy Awards of Merit. In addition, the film received a Special Achievement Award.)
51st	1978	The Deer Hunter	✓	✓	5	9	
52nd	1979	Kramer vs. Kramer	✓	✓	5	9	
53rd	1980	Ordinary People	✓	✓	4	6	
54th	1981	Chariots of Fire	✓	✓	4	7	
54th	1981	Raiders of the Lost Ark		✓	4	8	(Note: Raiders of the Lost Ark received 4 competitive Academy Awards of Merit. In addition, the film received a Special Achievement Award.)
55th	1982	Gandhi	✓	✓	8	11	
56th	1983	Terms of Endearment	✓	✓	5	11	
57th	1984	Amadeus	✓	✓	8	11	
58th	1985	Out of Africa	✓	✓	7	11	
59th	1986	Platoon	✓	✓	4	8	
60th	1987	The Last Emperor	✓	✓	9	9	
61st	1988	Rain Man	✓	✓	4	8	(Note: At the 61st Academy Awards (1988), Rain Man and Who Framed Roger Rabbit each received 4 awards. Rain Man received 4 competitive Academy Awards of Merit. Who Framed Roger Rabbit received 3 competitive Academy Awards of Merit; in addition, the film received a Special Achievement Award.)
62nd	1989	Driving Miss Daisy	✓	✓	4	9	
63rd	1990	Dances with Wolves	✓	✓	7	12	
64th	1991	The Silence of the Lambs	✓	✓	5	7	
65th	1992	Unforgiven	✓	✓	4	9	
66th	1993	Schindler's List	✓	✓	7	12	
67th	1994	Forrest Gump	✓	✓	6	13	
68th	1995	Braveheart	✓	✓	5	10	
69th	1996	The English Patient	✓	✓	9	12	
70th	1997	Titanic	✓	✓	11	14	
71st	1998	Shakespeare in Love	✓	✓	7	13	
72nd	1999	American Beauty	✓	✓	5	8	
73rd	2000	Gladiator	✓	✓	5	12	
74th	2001	A Beautiful Mind	✓	✓	4	8	
74th	2001	The Lord of the Rings: The Fellowship of the Ring		✓	4	13	
75th	2002	Chicago	✓	✓	6	13	
76th	2003	The Lord of the Rings: The Return of the King	✓	✓	11	11	
77th	2004	The Aviator		✓	5	11	
78th	2005	Brokeback Mountain		✓	3	8	
78th	2005	Crash	✓	✓	3	6	
78th	2005	King Kong			3	4	
78th	2005	Memoirs of a Geisha			3	6	
79th	2006	The Departed	✓	✓	4	5	
80th	2007	No Country for Old Men	✓	✓	4	8	
81st	2008	Slumdog Millionaire	✓	✓	8	10	
82nd	2009	The Hurt Locker	✓	✓	6	9	
83rd	2010	Inception		✓	4	8	
83rd	2010	The King's Speech	✓	✓	4	12	
84th	2011	The Artist	✓	✓	5	10	
84th	2011	Hugo		✓	5	11	
85th	2012	Life of Pi		✓	4	11	
86th	2013	Gravity		✓	7	10	
87th	2014	Birdman or (The Unexpected Virtue of Ignorance)	✓	✓	4	9	
87th	2014	The Grand Budapest Hotel		✓	4	9	
88th	2015	Mad Max: Fury Road		✓	6	10	
89th	2016	La La Land		✓	6	14	
90th	2017	The Shape of Water	✓	✓	4	13	
91st	2018	Bohemian Rhapsody		✓	4	5	
92nd	2019	Parasite	✓	✓	4	6	
93rd	2020–2021	Nomadland	✓	✓	3	6	
94th	2021	Dune		✓	6	10	
95th	2022	Everything Everywhere All at Once	✓	✓	7	11	
96th	2023	Oppenheimer	✓	✓	7	13	
97th	2024	Anora	✓	✓	5	6	
98th	2025	One Battle After Another	✓	✓	6	13	
98 Ceremonies	98 Years in Film	120 Film Titles	78 Winners	111 Nominees	599 Awards	1034 Nominations	Column Totals

== Historical progression of most Academy Awards per ceremony ==
This table displays the historical progression of films receiving a record number of Academy Awards:

Record Number of Awards	Film Title	Achievement	Academy Awards Season		Duration of Record
Record Number of Awards	Film Title	Achievement	Ceremony	Year in Film	Duration of Record
3 awards	7th Heaven	Set Record	1st	1927–1928	6 years
3 awards	Sunrise	Set Record	1st	1927–1928	6 years
3 awards	Cimarron	Tied Record	4th	1930–1931	6 years
3 awards	Cavalcade	Tied Record	6th	1932–1933	6 years
5 awards	It Happened One Night	Broke Record	7th	1934	5 years
8 awards	Gone with the Wind	Broke Record	12th	1939	19 years
8 awards	From Here to Eternity	Tied Record	26th	1953	19 years
8 awards	On the Waterfront	Tied Record	27th	1954	19 years
9 awards	Gigi	Broke Record	31st	1958	1 year
11 awards	Ben-Hur	Broke Record	32nd	1959	66 years
11 awards	Titanic	Tied Record	70th	1997	66 years
11 awards	The Lord of the Rings: The Return of the King	Tied Record	76th	2003	66 years

== List of films receiving the most Academy Award nominations per ceremony ==
Academy Awards Season		Film Title	Best Picture		Nominations	Awards (Note: This column includes competitive awards (i.e., Academy Awards of Merit) only. It does not include the following: Honorary Awards; Special Awards; Special Achievement Awards; and Scientific or Technical Awards.)	Notes
Ceremony	Year in Film	Film Title	Winner	Nominee	Nominations	Awards	Notes
1st	1927–1928	7th Heaven		✓	5	3	
2nd	1928–1929	In Old Arizona		✓	5	1	
2nd	1928–1929	The Patriot		✓	5	1	
3rd	1929–1930	The Love Parade		✓	6	0	
4th	1930–1931	Cimarron	✓	✓	7	3	
5th	1931–1932	Arrowsmith		✓	4	0	
5th	1931–1932	The Champ		✓	4	2	
6th	1932–1933	Cavalcade	✓	✓	4	3	
6th	1932–1933	A Farewell to Arms		✓	4	2	
6th	1932–1933	Lady for a Day		✓	4	0	
7th	1934	One Night of Love		✓	6	2	(Note: One Night of Love received 2 competitive Academy Awards of Merit. In addition, the film received a Scientific or Technical Award (Class III).)
8th	1935	Mutiny on the Bounty	✓	✓	8	1	
9th	1936	Anthony Adverse		✓	7	4	
9th	1936	Dodsworth		✓	7	1	
9th	1936	The Great Ziegfeld	✓	✓	7	3	
10th	1937	The Life of Emile Zola	✓	✓	10	3	
11th	1938	You Can't Take It with You	✓	✓	7	2	
12th	1939	Gone with the Wind	✓	✓	13	8	(Note: Gone with the Wind received 8 competitive Academy Awards of Merit. In addition, the film received a Special Award and a Scientific or Technical Award (Class III).)
13th	1940	Rebecca	✓	✓	11	2	
14th	1941	Sergeant York		✓	11	2	
15th	1942	Mrs. Miniver	✓	✓	12	6	
16th	1943	The Song of Bernadette		✓	12	4	
17th	1944	Going My Way	✓	✓	10	7	
17th	1944	Wilson		✓	10	5	
18th	1945	The Bells of St. Mary's		✓	8	1	
19th	1946	The Best Years of Our Lives	✓	✓	8	7	(Note: The Best Years of Our Lives received 7 competitive Academy Awards of Merit. In addition, the film received a Special Award.)
20th	1947	Gentleman's Agreement	✓	✓	8	3	
21st	1948	Johnny Belinda		✓	12	1	
22nd	1949	The Heiress		✓	8	4	
23rd	1950	All About Eve	✓	✓	14	6	
24th	1951	A Streetcar Named Desire		✓	12	4	
25th	1952	High Noon		✓	7	4	
25th	1952	Moulin Rouge		✓	7	2	
25th	1952	The Quiet Man		✓	7	2	
26th	1953	From Here to Eternity	✓	✓	13	8	
27th	1954	On the Waterfront	✓	✓	12	8	
28th	1955	Love Is a Many-Splendored Thing		✓	8	3	
28th	1955	Marty	✓	✓	8	4	
28th	1955	The Rose Tattoo		✓	8	3	
29th	1956	Giant		✓	10	1	
30th	1957	Sayonara		✓	10	4	
31st	1958	The Defiant Ones		✓	9	2	
31st	1958	Gigi	✓	✓	9	9	
32nd	1959	Ben-Hur	✓	✓	12	11	
33rd	1960	The Apartment	✓	✓	10	5	
34th	1961	Judgment at Nuremberg		✓	11	2	
34th	1961	West Side Story	✓	✓	11	10	
35th	1962	Lawrence of Arabia	✓	✓	10	7	
36th	1963	Tom Jones	✓	✓	10	4	
37th	1964	Mary Poppins		✓	13	5	
38th	1965	Doctor Zhivago		✓	10	5	
38th	1965	The Sound of Music	✓	✓	10	5	
39th	1966	Who's Afraid of Virginia Woolf?		✓	13	5	
40th	1967	Bonnie and Clyde		✓	10	2	
40th	1967	Guess Who's Coming to Dinner		✓	10	2	
41st	1968	Oliver!	✓	✓	11	5	(Note: Oliver! received 5 competitive Academy Awards of Merit. In addition, the film received an Honorary Award.)
42nd	1969	Anne of the Thousand Days		✓	10	1	
43rd	1970	Airport		✓	10	1	
43rd	1970	Patton	✓	✓	10	7	
44th	1971	Fiddler on the Roof		✓	8	3	
44th	1971	The French Connection	✓	✓	8	5	
44th	1971	The Last Picture Show		✓	8	2	
45th	1972	Cabaret		✓	10	8	
45th	1972	The Godfather	✓	✓	10	3	
46th	1973	The Exorcist		✓	10	2	
46th	1973	The Sting	✓	✓	10	7	
47th	1974	Chinatown		✓	11	1	
47th	1974	The Godfather Part II	✓	✓	11	6	
48th	1975	One Flew Over the Cuckoo's Nest	✓	✓	9	5	
49th	1976	Network		✓	10	4	
49th	1976	Rocky	✓	✓	10	3	
50th	1977	Julia		✓	11	3	
50th	1977	The Turning Point		✓	11	0	
51st	1978	The Deer Hunter	✓	✓	9	5	
51st	1978	Heaven Can Wait		✓	9	1	
52nd	1979	All That Jazz		✓	9	4	
52nd	1979	Kramer vs. Kramer	✓	✓	9	5	
53rd	1980	The Elephant Man		✓	8	0	
53rd	1980	Raging Bull		✓	8	2	
54th	1981	Reds		✓	12	3	
55th	1982	Gandhi	✓	✓	11	8	
56th	1983	Terms of Endearment	✓	✓	11	5	
57th	1984	Amadeus	✓	✓	11	8	
57th	1984	A Passage to India		✓	11	2	
58th	1985	The Color Purple		✓	11	0	
58th	1985	Out of Africa	✓	✓	11	7	
59th	1986	Platoon	✓	✓	8	4	
59th	1986	A Room with a View		✓	8	3	
60th	1987	The Last Emperor	✓	✓	9	9	
61st	1988	Rain Man	✓	✓	8	4	
62nd	1989	Driving Miss Daisy	✓	✓	9	4	
63rd	1990	Dances with Wolves	✓	✓	12	7	
64th	1991	Bugsy		✓	10	2	
65th	1992	Howards End		✓	9	3	
65th	1992	Unforgiven	✓	✓	9	4	
66th	1993	Schindler's List	✓	✓	12	7	
67th	1994	Forrest Gump	✓	✓	13	6	
68th	1995	Braveheart	✓	✓	10	5	
69th	1996	The English Patient	✓	✓	12	9	
70th	1997	Titanic	✓	✓	14	11	
71st	1998	Shakespeare in Love	✓	✓	13	7	
72nd	1999	American Beauty	✓	✓	8	5	
73rd	2000	Gladiator	✓	✓	12	5	
74th	2001	The Lord of the Rings: The Fellowship of the Ring		✓	13	4	
75th	2002	Chicago	✓	✓	13	6	
76th	2003	The Lord of the Rings: The Return of the King	✓	✓	11	11	
77th	2004	The Aviator		✓	11	5	
78th	2005	Brokeback Mountain		✓	8	3	
79th	2006	Dreamgirls			8	2	
80th	2007	No Country for Old Men	✓	✓	8	4	
80th	2007	There Will Be Blood		✓	8	2	
81st	2008	The Curious Case of Benjamin Button		✓	13	3	
82nd	2009	Avatar		✓	9	3	
82nd	2009	The Hurt Locker	✓	✓	9	6	
83rd	2010	The King's Speech	✓	✓	12	4	
84th	2011	Hugo		✓	11	5	
85th	2012	Lincoln		✓	12	2	
86th	2013	American Hustle		✓	10	0	
86th	2013	Gravity		✓	10	7	
87th	2014	Birdman or (The Unexpected Virtue of Ignorance)	✓	✓	9	4	
87th	2014	The Grand Budapest Hotel		✓	9	4	
88th	2015	The Revenant		✓	12	3	
89th	2016	La La Land		✓	14	6	
90th	2017	The Shape of Water	✓	✓	13	4	
91st	2018	The Favourite		✓	10	1	
91st	2018	Roma		✓	10	3	
92nd	2019	Joker		✓	11	2	
93rd	2020–2021	Mank		✓	10	2	
94th	2021	The Power of the Dog		✓	12	1	
95th	2022	Everything Everywhere All at Once	✓	✓	11	7	
96th	2023	Oppenheimer	✓	✓	13	7	
97th	2024	Emilia Pérez		✓	13	2	
98th	2025	Sinners		✓	16	4	
97 Ceremonies	97 Years in Film	132 Film Titles	60 Winners	131 Nominees	1,284 Nominations	531 Awards	Column Totals

== Historical progression of most Academy Award nominations per ceremony ==
This table displays the historical progression of films receiving a record number of Academy Award nominations:

Record Number of Nominations	Film Title	Achievement	Academy Awards Season		Duration of Record
Record Number of Nominations	Film Title	Achievement	Ceremony	Year in Film	Duration of Record
5 nominations	7th Heaven	Set Record	1st	1927–1928	2 years
5 nominations	In Old Arizona	Tied Record	2nd	1928–1929	2 years
5 nominations	The Patriot	Tied Record	2nd	1928–1929	2 years
6 nominations	The Love Parade	Broke Record	3rd	1929–1930	1 year
7 nominations	Cimarron	Broke Record	4th	1930–1931	4 years
8 nominations	Mutiny on the Bounty	Broke Record	8th	1935	2 years
10 nominations	The Life of Emile Zola	Broke Record	10th	1937	2 years
13 nominations	Gone with the Wind	Broke Record	12th	1939	11 years
14 nominations	All About Eve	Broke Record	23rd	1950	75 years
14 nominations	Titanic	Tied Record	70th	1997	75 years
14 nominations	La La Land	Tied Record	89th	2016	75 years
16 nominations	Sinners	Broke Record	98th	2025	0 years

== Superlatives ==
Films receiving the most Academy Awards per ceremony

- The Lord of the Rings: The Return of the King (2003) earned the largest "clean sweep" of Academy Awards, winning all 11 awards out of its 11 nominations (including Best Picture).

Films receiving the most Academy Award nominations per ceremony

- With only one exception – Dreamgirls (2006) – every film on this list above was nominated for Best Picture.

Films receiving the most Academy Awards and the most Academy Award nominations per ceremony

- A total of 69 films appear on both lists above. That is, there are 69 films that received the most Academy Awards – as well as the most Academy Award nominations – in their respective years of eligibility.
  - Of these 69 films, all 69 received a Best Picture nomination.
  - Of these 69 films, 52 received the Best Picture award.

Best Picture winners receiving the most Academy Awards and the most Academy Award nominations per ceremony

- A total of 69 films received both the most Academy Awards and the most Academy Award nominations in their respective years of eligibility. Of these 69 films, 52 also received the Best Picture award.
  - The first film to achieve this feat was: Cimarron (1930–1931).
  - The most recent film to achieve this feat was: Oppenheimer (2023).

Record-breaking films

- The following four films either set, broke, or tied both records – the film with the most Academy Awards and the film with the most Academy Award nominations – in their respective years of eligibility:
  - 7th Heaven (1927–1928),
  - Cimarron (1930–1931),
  - Gone with the Wind (1939), and
  - Titanic (1997).

== See also ==
- List of Academy Award records
