= Little Golden Guy =

- Website type: Film
- Available in: English
- Owner: Little Golden Guy
- Creator: Brian Barney
- Website: Little Golden Guy
- Registration: Optional
- Launched: 1999
- Current status: inactive

Little Golden Guy is a website which presents statistical data related to the Academy Awards (also known as the Oscars). Launched by Brian Barney in 1999, the search engine provides a method of tabulating the films and individuals holding records for the most nominations and awards within a particular category or within a specified timeframe. The website maintains data from the 1st Academy Awards ceremony, honoring films from 1927 and 1928, to the 84th Academy Awards ceremony, honoring films from 2011. The site's search results also provide internal links to annual summaries, as well as statistical breakdowns of individual awards categories. The site has not been updated since the 2013 Academy Awards.

== See also ==
- Academy Awards
- List of Academy Award records
- List of films receiving six or more Academy Awards
- List of films receiving the Academy Award "Big Five"
- List of people who have won multiple Academy Awards in a single year
- List of superlative Academy Award winners and nominees
