= Foyle Film Festival =

The Foyle Film Festival is an annual film festival based in Derry, Northern Ireland. It typically takes place in November. Established in 1987, it is Northern Ireland's longest running film festival, according to the organisers. It is the only Oscar and BAFTA-affiliated film festival in Northern Ireland. The 1995 event included the first public showing of Danny Boyle's Trainspotting.

== History ==
The Foyle Film Festival is an annual film festival based in Derry, Northern Ireland. It typically takes place in November. Established in 1987, the organisers describe it as "Northern Ireland's longest running film festival". It is the only Oscar and BAFTA-affiliated film festival in Northern Ireland, and one of only a few festivals worldwide with Oscar, BAFTA and BIFA affiliation. The affiliations mean that prizewinners in certain categories can be considered for Academy, BAFTA and BIFA awards without needing a theatrical run.

The 1995 event included the first public showing of Danny Boyle's Trainspotting. The 21st festival, which took place in November 2008, included the Northern Ireland premieres of Brideshead Revisited and Hounddog. The 30th anniversary festival, held in 2017, involved a "10-day programme [..of..] more than 100 screenings in Londonderry's Guildhall, Nerve Centre and Brunswick Moviebowl".

== Awards ==
The festival includes the Light in Motion competition, which presents a number of awards in filmmaking and animation. In 2025 the categories include awards for the Best Irish Short, Best International Short, Best Animated Short, British Short Film and British Short Animation.

Award winning entries in 2024 included The Wedding Veil of the Proud Princess by Anna-Ester Volozh (Best British Animated Short Film), Remember to Breathe by Joe Simmons (Best British Short Film), Póg Mo Pigeon by Clíodhna Lyons (Best Animated Short Film), After Dark by Iain Forbes (Best International Short Film), and Turnaround by Aisling Byrne (Best Irish Short Film).

Previous films that have won at Foyle Film Festival and gone on to win an Academy Award include Guy Nattiv and Jaime Ray Newman for Skin (2019), Chris Overton and Rachel Shenton for The Silent Child (2018), and Andrea Arnold for Wasp (2004). Films that have gone on to win BAFTAs include Paloma Baeza and Ser En Low for Poles Apart (2018), Nina Gantz and Emilie Jouffroy for Edmond (2016) and Grant Orchard and Sue Goffe for A Morning Stroll (2012).

== See also ==
- River Foyle
