= University of West London =

Public research university in England

Coordinates: 51°30′23″N 0°18′15″W

- Former names: Thames Valley University, Polytechnic of West London, Lady Byron School, Ealing College of Higher Education, Thames Valley College of Higher Education, Queen Charlotte's College of Health Care Studies
- Type: Public
- Established: 1992 (as Thames Valley University); 1860 (as the Lady Byron School)
- Affiliations: University Alliance
- Endowment: £1.76 million (2022)
- Budget: £168.6 million (2021–22)
- Chancellor: Laurence Geller (since 1 August 2010)
- Vice-Chancellor: Peter John (since 1 July 2017)
- Students: 17,690 HE (2024/25)
- Undergraduates: 12,980 (2024/25)
- Postgraduates: 4,710 (2024/25)
- Other students: 28,290 FE
- Location: Ealing, Brentford, and Reading, England
- Website: uwl.ac.uk

The University of West London (UWL) is a public research university in England, with campuses in Ealing, Brentford and Reading, Berkshire.

The university has roots in 1860 when the Lady Byron School was founded, later Ealing College of Higher Education. In 1992, the then-named Polytechnic of West London became a university as Thames Valley University (TVU). 18 years later, after several mergers, acquisitions and campus moves, it was renamed to its current name.

The University of West London comprises nine schools: The Claude Littner Business School, the London Geller College of Hospitality and Tourism, the School of Computing and Engineering, the London College of Music, the College of Nursing, Midwifery and Healthcare, the School of Law, the School of Human and Social Sciences, the School of Biomedical Sciences and the London School of Film, Media and Design.

== History ==
The University of West London traces its roots back to 1860 when the Lady Byron School was founded at what is now the University of West London's Ealing campus. The school later became Ealing College of Higher Education.

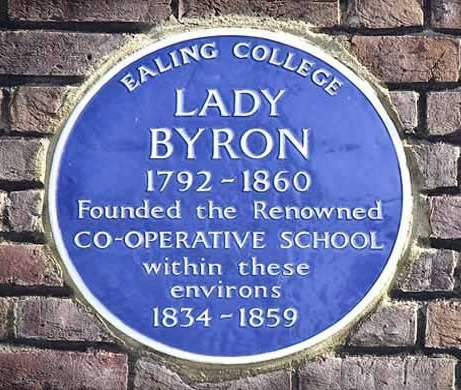
Ealing College, founded in 1860 by Lady Byron

The Slough campus was founded in January 1912 as a selective secondary school on William Street. By the 1960s, it had become Slough College of Further Education. In the 1960’s the St Mary’s Road site was known as Ealing Technical College, offering CNAA degrees in law (and others). In the 1980s it became Thames Valley College of Higher Education but was closed in 2011.

In 1991, Ealing College of Higher Education, Thames Valley College of Higher Education, Queen Charlotte's College of Health Care Studies and London College of Music were merged to become the Polytechnic of West London. Two years later, the polytechnic became a university under the Further and Higher Education Act 1992 and adopted the name Thames Valley University (TVU). In 1994, the university merged with Northwick Park School of Nursing, Riverside College of Nursing and the North West Thames Regional Authority's AIDS unit. In 1995, it merged with the Berkshire College of Nursing and Midwifery.

In 2004, the university merged with Reading College and School of Arts and Design, which had been founded in 1947 as Reading Technical College. Reading College's sites at Kings Road and Crescent Road became TVU sites.

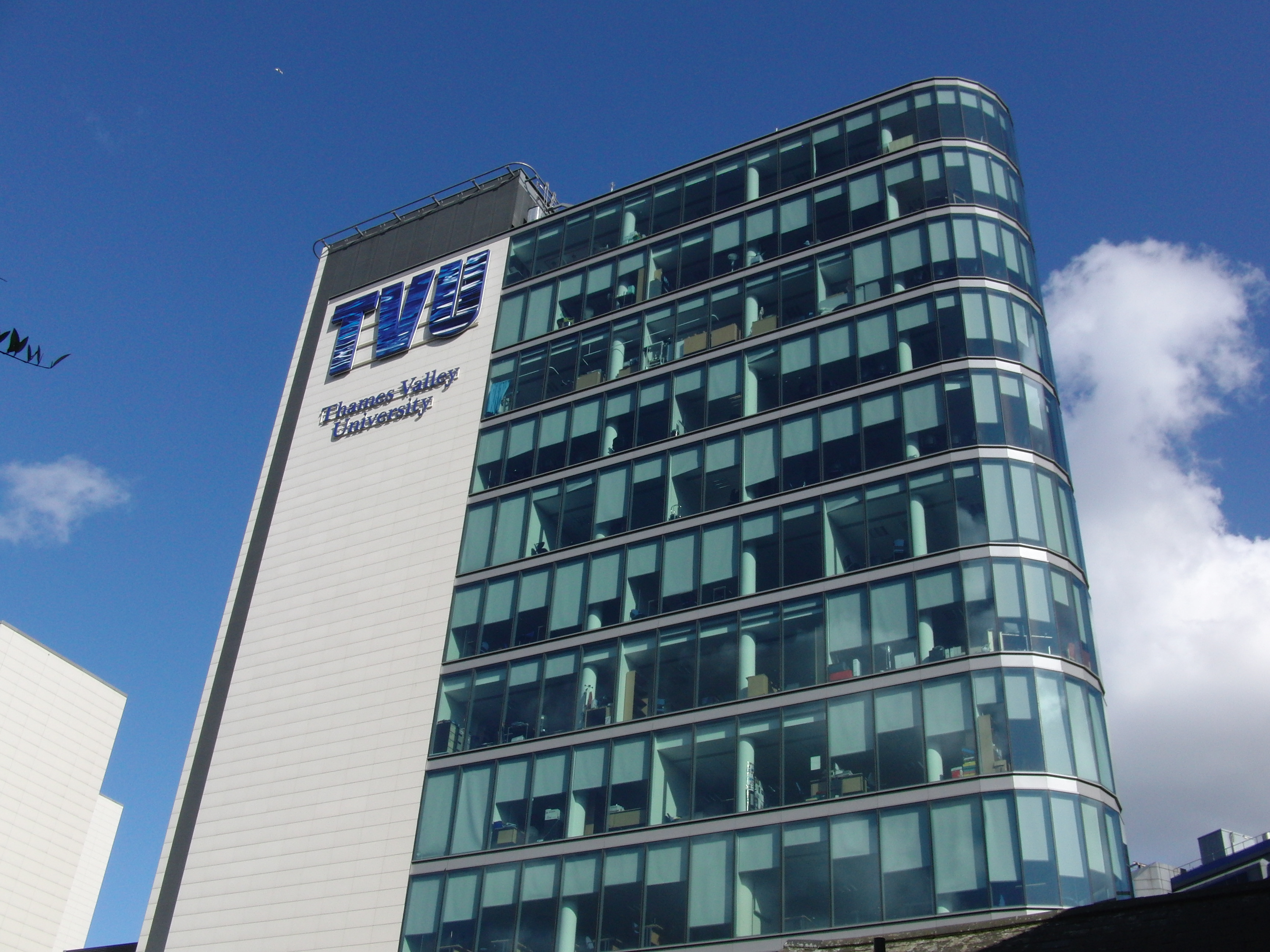
Paragon Campus in Brentford (former TVU branding)

In 2009, the university decided to divest itself of its further education courses, together with its Kings Road site that it had inherited from the Reading College and School of Arts and Design. In May 2009, the university announced that it would be closing its Slough campus in 2010 due to the relocation of nursing students, who make up the majority of the student body there, to Reading. Other courses would be moved to one of the university's Greater London campuses. In July 2009, the university was awarded the Queen's Anniversary Prize for outstanding achievement and excellence in hospitality education.

In 2010 the responsibility for further education, along with the Kings Road site, was transferred to a relaunched Reading College. Although some 40 miles west of London, the university retained its other sites in Reading, including the Crescent Road site that also originated with Reading College and the School of Arts and Design.

In August 2010, it was announced that the university would change its name to the University of West London, with the Privy Council subsequently granting permission for the change. The university unveiled a new logo in April 2011. Vice-chancellor Peter John stated that the changes reflected the university's development since 1992 and a new focus on its Brentford and Ealing campuses.

In 2015, a £100 million expansion of the Ealing campus was completed. This work included new facilities such as a new library, student union and updated teaching facilities - building which was highly unpopular with many of the locals.

In 2019 the university merged with Drama Studio London in Ealing, and in 2021 it merged with Ruskin College, Oxford.

== Campuses ==
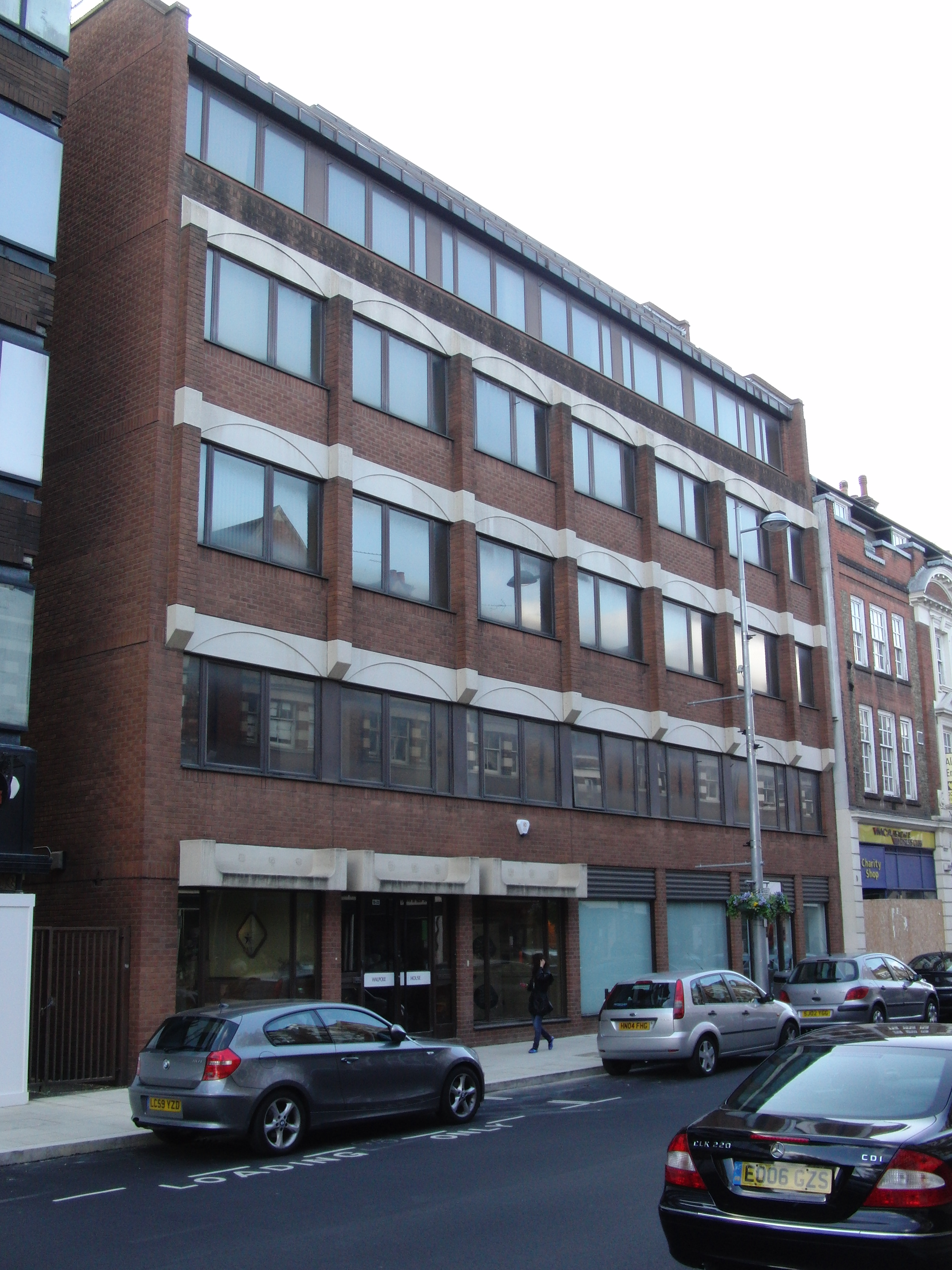
Walpole House in Ealing, housing the university's administration.

There are two campus sites in western Greater London, located at St Mary's Road, Ealing and Paragon House in Brentford. There is also a third site in Reading, Berkshire, which is some 35 miles (55 km) from the Ealing sites.

In 2015, the St Mary's Road, Ealing campus underwent a £100 million transformation, with a new social area, library, student union, gym and updated facilities. In 2017, a further £1M was invested in the development of the Paragon campus in Brentford and the addition of a nursing simulation centre in the Reading campus.

The Ealing campus is home to The Heathrow Archive, a collection of more than 800 artefacts that tell the story of Heathrow Airport's history from 1946 to 2016.

In 2017, the University of West London launched its overseas branch campus in Ras Al Khaimah, United Arab Emirates.

== Organisation ==
The University of West London comprises nine schools: The Claude Littner Business School, the London Geller College of Hospitality and Tourism, the School of Computing and Engineering, the London College of Music, the College of Nursing, Midwifery and Healthcare, the School of Law, the School of Human and Social Sciences, the School of Biomedical Sciences, and the London School of Film, Media and Design.

The Graduate School (based in Ealing) coordinates and provides support to research activities and research degree courses. The University offers traditional PhD programmes and Professional Doctorates.

The university also works with the Met Film School, a private film school that is based at Ealing Studios in London, United Kingdom. The school, which launched in 2003, offers two and three-year bachelor's programmes as well as various master's degree programmes, which are accredited through the University of West London.

== Academic reputation ==
=== Academic rankings ===
Rankings
National rankings
- Complete (2027): 70
- Guardian (2027): 47
- Times / Sunday Times (2027): 75=

Global rankings
- THE (2026): 1201–1500

In 2020, the university was ranked 34th best university (out of 130+ institutions) in the UK by the 2021 edition of The Times and Sunday Times Good University Guide. In 2021, the university was ranked 34th in The Guardian university guide and the university was named the top modern university in London in The Guardian University Guide 2022.

The university was ranked 801-1000 in the Times Higher Education Impact Rankings 2024 that evaluates universities worldwide based on their contributions to the United Nations' Sustainable Development Goals (SDGs). As such, within specific Sustainable Development Goals (SDGs), UWL achieved the following rankings: 101-200 for Reduced Inequalities (SDG 10), 301-400 for Responsible Consumption and Production (SDG 12), and 801-1000 for both Good Health and Well-being (SDG 3) and Partnerships for the Goals (SDG 17).

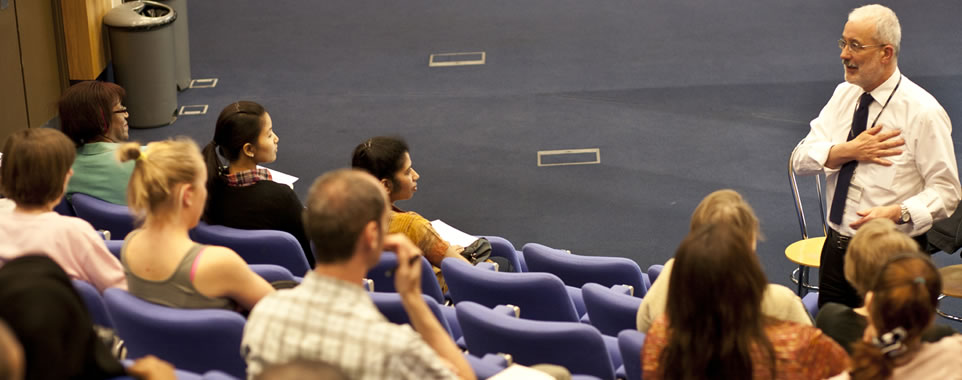
A lecture at the University of West London, Ealing Campus

The university recorded the best results of any university in Greater London in the annual National Student Survey (NSS) in 2016, with students' responses showing it to be the best University in Greater London for student satisfaction. In the NSS 2016, there were 100 per cent overall satisfaction rates for nine courses across the University's eight schools, ranging from Midwifery to Business Studies and Music Technology to Hospitality Management. Among these 100 per cent overall satisfaction rates, the University recorded the best overall satisfaction rates in the UK for Civil Engineering and Building courses in the NSS 2016. In 2021, UWL was named the university of the year for student experience in The Times and Sunday Times Good University Guide.

=== Teaching standards ===
In 2009, the university was the only university to win the Queen's Anniversary Prize for outstanding achievement and excellence in hospitality education – and it regularly wins awards from major industry bodies. University of West London Careers and Employment Service is a member of the Association of Graduate Careers Advisory Services and has previously been awarded the Matrix Standard for Quality.

== Student life ==
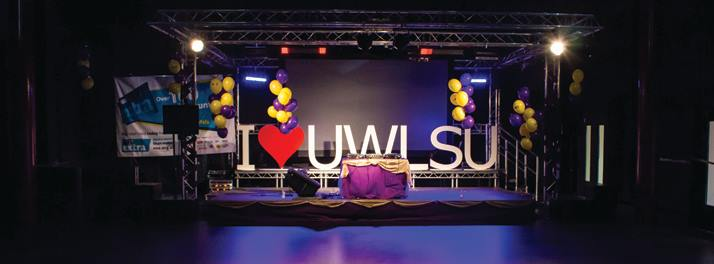
The new UWL Students' Union, opened in 2013

=== Students' Union ===
The University of West London Students' Union (UWLSU) is the recognised student organisation of the University of West London. UWLSU is affiliated with the National Union of Students.

The union has the ground floor of the North Building at the St. Mary's Road campus and is home to a cafe - Coffee Union and social space - Freddie's. The Sports Centre is also located on the Park Road entrance of the St. Mary's Road campus which is open exclusively to UWL staff, students, alumni, and residents that live within the local area. The union also has a space on the second floor at the Paragon campus and a third space on the 9th floor at the Reading campus.

The union aims to bring students academic advice and advocacy support, events, ways to take up new activities, and sports, and a place to socialise. With the course representative programme run by their Student Voice team, students can apply to be a course or school representative to help advocate for academic change.

=== Student accommodation ===
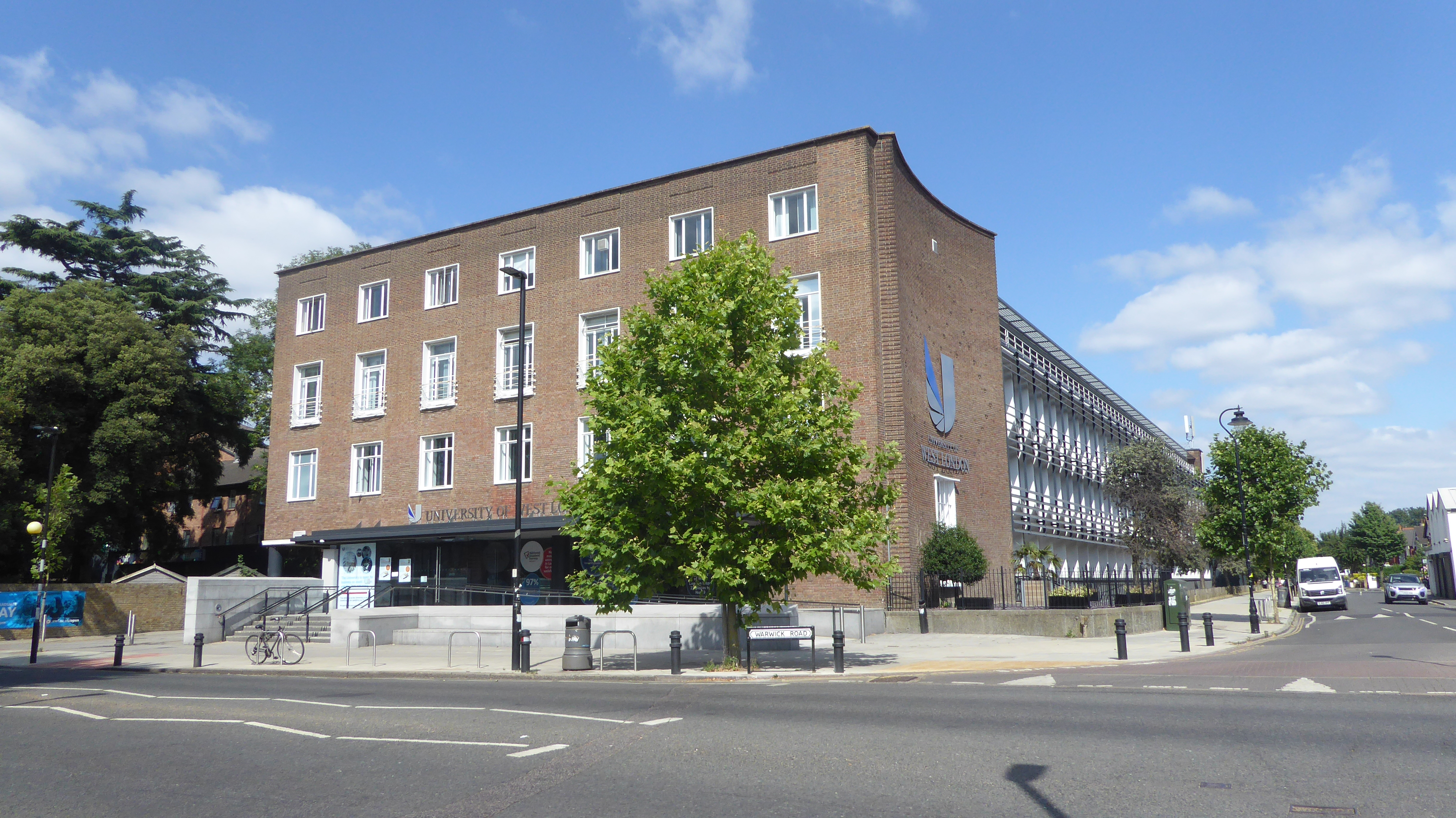
The University of West London Campus at St Mary's Road, Ealing

Before 2006, the university operated halls of residence only at the Reading campus, although several private houses in the Ealing area were rented by the university and allocated to students studying there. In September 2006 the university began to offer halls of residence accommodation to students from the Ealing and Slough campuses at a student and keyworker accommodation site named Paragon. The site won the 'Major Housing Project of the Year' category at the 2007 Building Awards, and is in Brentford, approximately two miles away from the Ealing campus.

Paragon is home to the tallest building to be completed using modern methods of construction (MMC) in the UK, which serves as a 130,000 sq ft (12,000 m^{2}) academic facility for the university's human sciences facility. The student accommodation at Paragon had been criticised by its residents for being too expensive, costing the highest of all Greater London universities' halls of residence along with SOAS in the 2007–2008 year. TVU defended the costs, asserting that the halls are of an especially high standard.

In 2020, Notting Hill Genesis, the company that owned the Paragon student lets site, controversially closed the entire student halls of residence due to fire safety concerns, asking students to immediately evacuate. Students were moved to temporary housing in nearby Wembley whilst the university found suitable housing. Accommodation for students at UWL now varies from shared housing to student lets in Ealing, Acton and the surrounding area.

== Controversies ==
In the mid-1990s, its high-profile vice-chancellor, Mike Fitzgerald, ushered through a networked "New Learning Environment" for undergraduate students, involving a shift to online delivery and assessment. The NLE was discontinued in this form, and Fitzgerald resigned in 1998 following a negative Quality Assurance Agency report stating there were "significant management failures" in the delivery of this model. The University suffered severe financial shortfalls in the years that followed.

== Notable people ==
=== Alumni ===
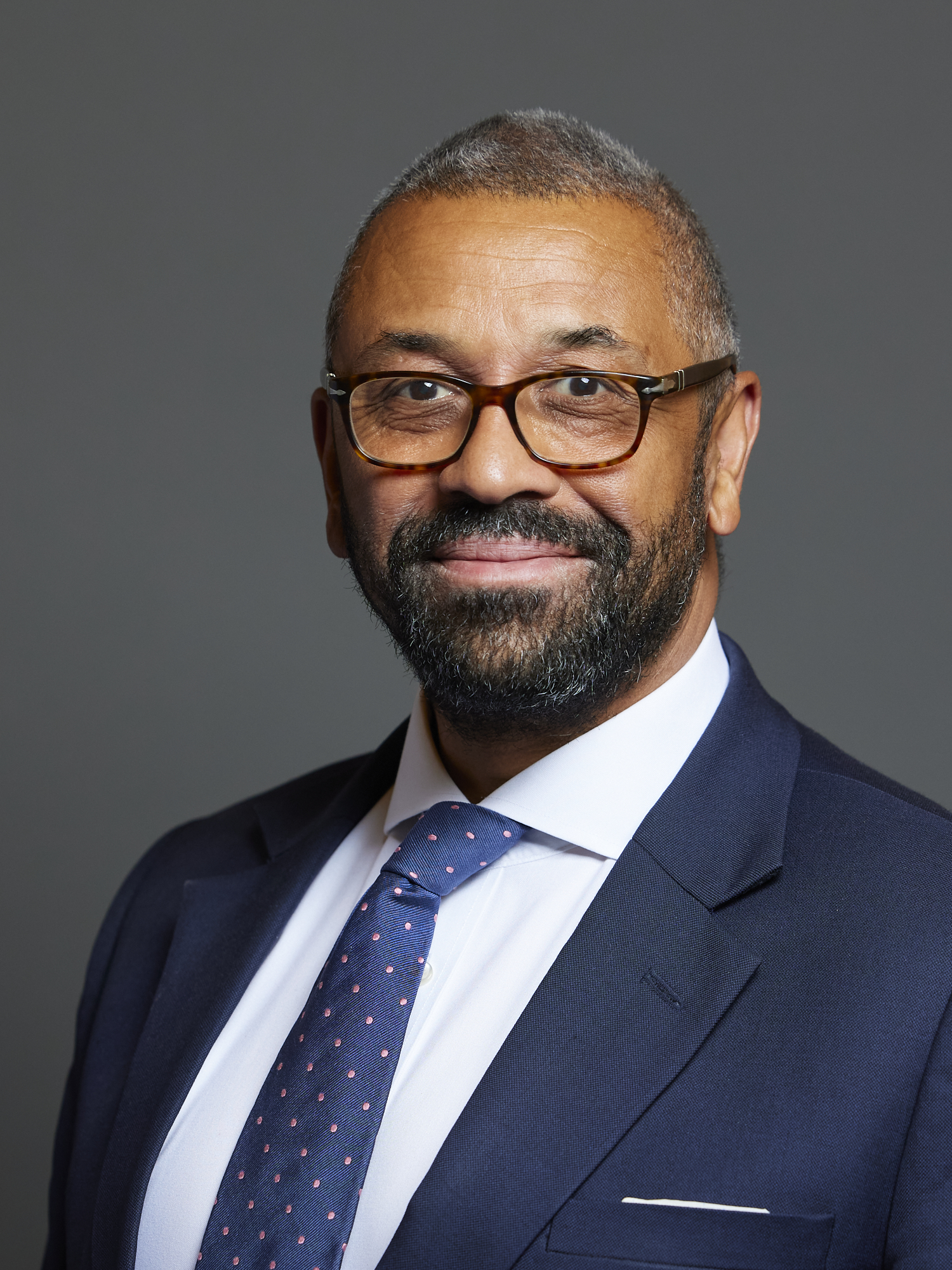
James Cleverly, former Foreign and Home Secretary

==== In politics ====
- Diane James, former leader of the UK Independence Party
- Faisal Karim Kundi, Politician and Governor of Khyber Pakhtunkhwa
- James Cleverly MP, Conservative Member of Parliament for Braintree, Foreign Secretary before being appointed Home Secretary in November 2023
- Noh Bin Omar, a Malaysian Politician
- M. Kulasegaran, Malaysian Human Resources Minister (2018-2020)
- Wan Ahmad Farid Wan Salleh, Chief Justice of Malaysia 2025
- Yang Jiechi, Chinese diplomat

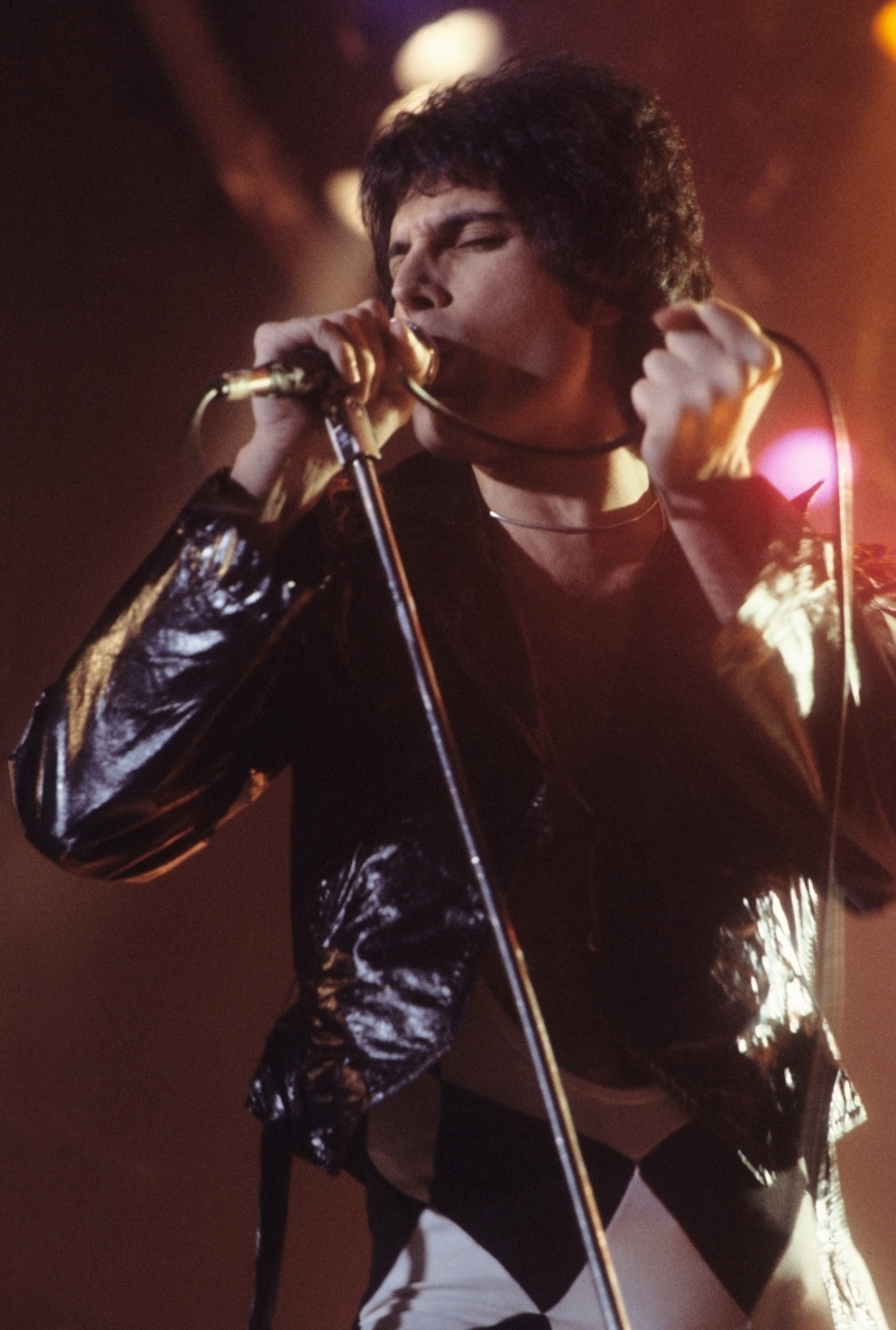
Freddie Mercury, British musician, former lead vocalist of Queen

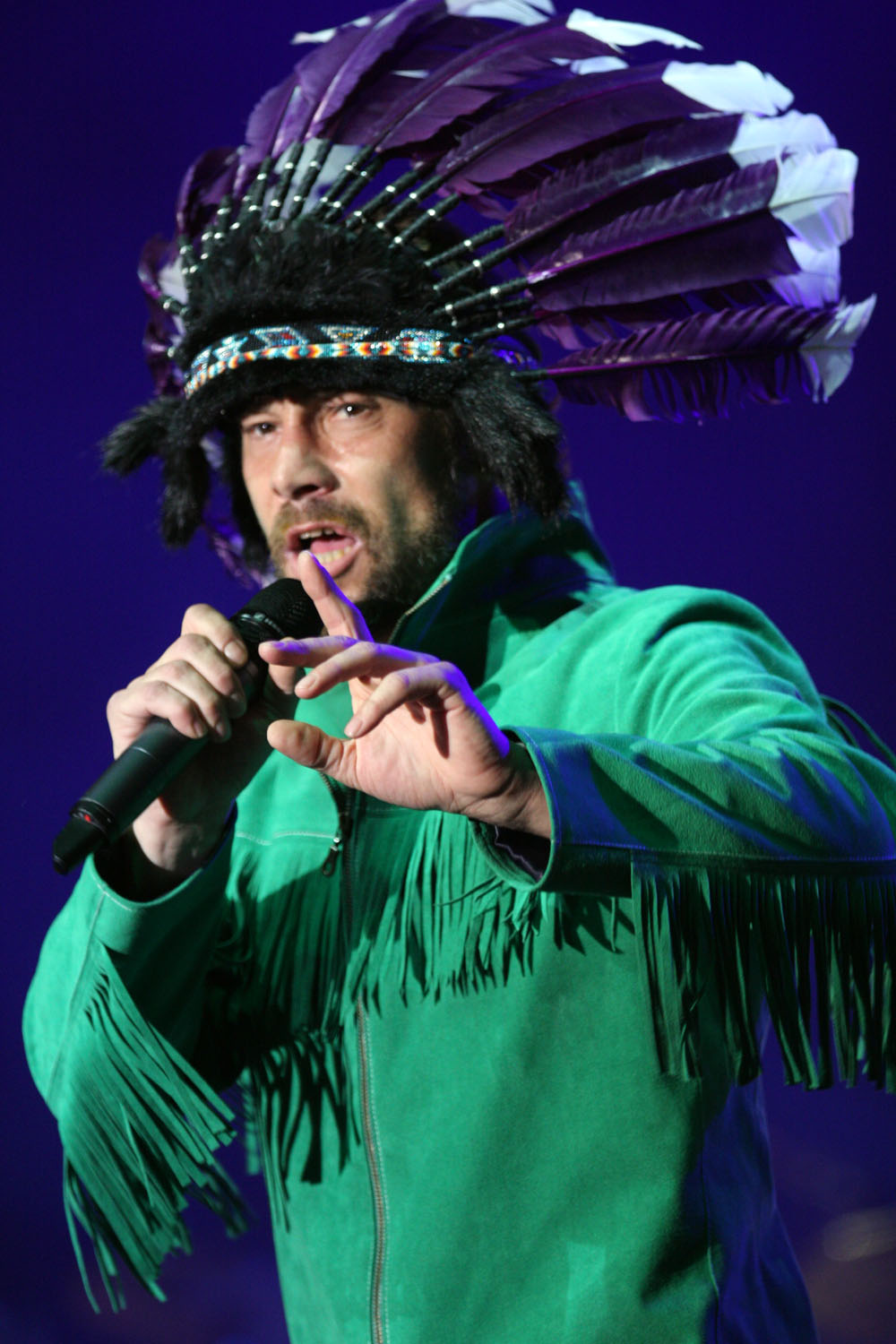
Jay Kay, British musician, lead singer and co-founder of Jamiroquai

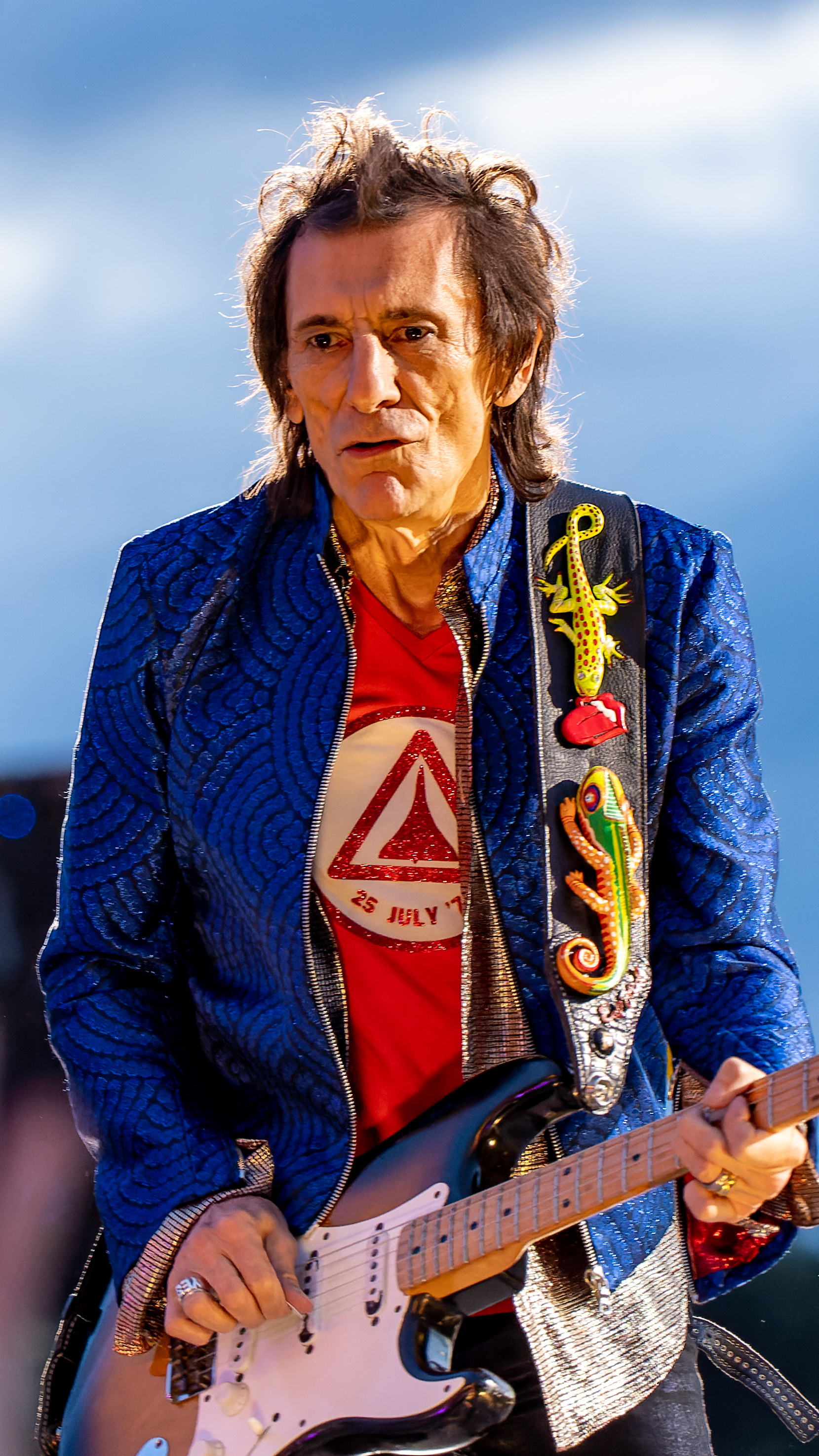
Ronnie Wood, English musician, member of the Rolling Stones

==== In the media, music and film industry ====
Several alumni of the University of West London are artists, musicians, Oscar nominees and winners:

- Fiona Adams, Ealing Art College - leading 1960s pop photographer
- Emma Anderson, English musician, songwriter, guitarist and singer in the band Lush
- Rebecca Harris (filmmaker), producer of The Silent Child, 2018 winner of the Academy Award for Best Live Action Short Film.
- Jay Kay, British singer and songwriter, lead vocalist of Jamiroquai
- Alex da Kid, English record producer and songwriter, now based in Los Angeles
- Freddie Mercury, Ealing Art College – lead vocalist and pianist of the rock band Queen
- Fodhla Cronin O'Reilly, 2013 Academy Award nominee for Best Animated Short Film
- Robert Orton, engineer and producer who worked with Trevor Horn, the Police, and won two Grammys for mixing Lady Gaga
- Ben Salter, musician who worked with Nile Rodgers in the United States
- Little Simz, Mercury Prize nominated British rapper and actress
- Matt Tong of Bloc Party
- Pete Townshend, Ealing Art College – English rock guitarist, vocalist, songwriter and author
- Ronnie Wood, Ealing Art College - rock musician, songwriter, artist and author

==== Business and other media ====
- Ian Russell Carter, Hilton Worldwide executive
- Chris Galvin, BSc International Culinary Arts – Galvin Restaurants (Galvin Bistrot de Luxe, Galvin at Windows, Galvin La Chapelle, Galvin Cafe a Vin).

=== Staff ===
- Mike Fitzgerald, Vice Chancellor, 1991–1998.
- Claire Gorham is an English journalist and television presenter, best known for The Girlie Show in the late 1990s.
- Mike Howlett is a teacher of music technology at the university, who previously performed with the bands Gong and Strontium 90, and produced many new wave acts in the 1970s and 1980s.
- Francis Pott, Head of Composition and Research Development at the London College of Music.
- Pip Williams, teaching music technology at the University
- Lola Young, Baroness Young of Hornsey
- David Foskett was named one of the most influential people in public sector catering for 2013.
- Christopher Small (1927–2011), musician and influential author on musicology, socio musicology and ethnomusicology, was Senior Lecturer in Music between 1971 and 1986.
- Barbara Tate (1927–2009), artist and author and an Honorary Professor of the university
- Claude Littner, Honorary Professor

== See also ==
- Armorial of UK universities
- List of universities in the UK
- Post-1992 universities
