= Rebecca Harris (filmmaker) =

British film producer (born 1992)

- Born: Rebecca Claire Harris; 26 March 1992 (age 33); London, United Kingdom
- Education: University of West London
- Occupation: Film producer
- Known for: The Silent Child

Rebecca Claire Harris (born 26 March 1992) is a British film producer.

== Early life and education ==
Harris grew up in Clanfield, Hampshire. She studied film production at the University of West London, graduating in 2013.

== Career ==
Harris is best known for producing The Silent Child. The film won the Academy Award for Best Live Action Short Film at the 90th Academy Awards. It tells the story of Libby, a profoundly deaf four-year-old girl, played by Maisie Sly, who lives a silent life until a social worker, played by Rachel Shenton, teaches her how to communicate through sign language. The film's television debut was on BBC One to an audience of 3.6 million.

Harris produced A Glimpse, starring Rachel Shenton and Chris Overton, which garnered critical acclaim and premiered in the UK in 2019 at Raindance Film Festival, in the US in 2020 at Santa Barbara International Film Festival. and in Australia in 2020 at Flickerfest International Film Festival.

Harris was commissioned by The Uncertain Kingdom to produce the film Sucka Punch as part of an anthology of twenty short films, released on Curzon Home Cinema, Amazon Prime, Google Play and iTunes in April 2020, which together offer an alternative snapshot of the UK in the year 2020.

=== Recognition ===
Harris received the title Honorary Doctor of Letters from The University of West London in 2018.

== Awards and nominations ==
On 4 March 2018, The Silent Child won the Academy Award for Best Live Action Short Film.

Awarding body	Country	Category	Film	Recipients	Result
Venice Film Awards	Venice, Italy	Best Short Film	A Glimpse	Tom Turner and Rebecca Harris	Won
Hollywood Gold Awards	Los Angeles, United States	Gold Award - Drama	A Glimpse	Tom Turner and Rebecca Harris	Won
Florence Film Awards	Florence, Italy	Best Drama	A Glimpse	Tom Turner and Rebecca Harris	Won
LA Edge Film Awards	Los Angeles, United States	Best Narrative Short	A Glimpse	Tom Turner and Rebecca Harris	Won
Latitude Film Awards	London, United Kingdom	Best Narrative Short	A Glimpse	Tom Turner and Rebecca Harris	Won
Madrid Film Awards	Madrid, Spain	Best Narrative Short	A Glimpse	Tom Turner and Rebecca Harris	Won
SCAD Savannah Film Festival	Georgia, United States	Live Action Short	A Glimpse	Tom Turner and Rebecca Harris	Nominated
HollyShorts Film Festival	Los Angeles, United States	Live Action Short	A Glimpse	Tom Turner and Rebecca Harris	Nominated
Rome Independent Film Awards	Rome, Italy	Best International Short	A Glimpse	Tom Turner and Rebecca Harris	Nominated
Canadian Cinematography Awards	Toronto, Canada	Best Short Film	A Glimpse	Tom Turner and Rebecca Harris	Nominated
The People's Film Festival	London, United Kingdom	Best Narrative Short	A Glimpse	Tom Turner and Rebecca Harris	Nominated
Gold Movie Awards	London, United Kingdom	Best Narrative Short	A Glimpse	Tom Turner and Rebecca Harris	Nominated
New Renaissance Film Festival	London, United Kingdom	Best Narrative Short	A Glimpse	Tom Turner and Rebecca Harris	Nominated
Raindance Film Festival	London, United Kingdom	Narrative Short	A Glimpse	Tom Turner and Rebecca Harris	Official selection
Santa Barbara International Film Festival	California, United States	Live Action Short	A Glimpse	Tom Turner and Rebecca Harris	Official selection
Flickerfest	Sydney, Australia	Live Action Short	A Glimpse	Tom Turner and Rebecca Harris	Official selection
