= HM Prison Northeye =

Former prison in Bexhill-on-Sea, East Sussex, England

HMP Northeye
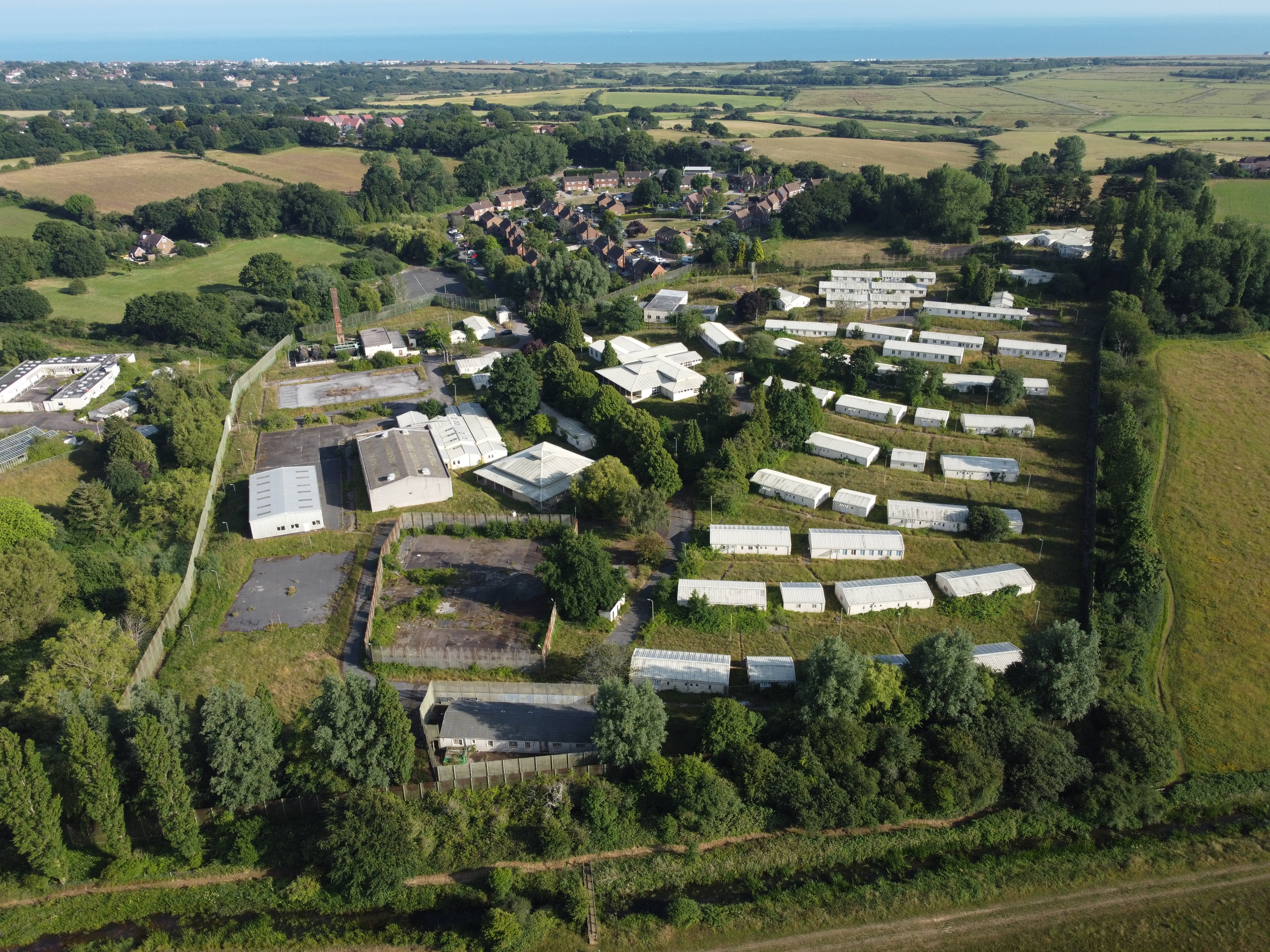
- Northeye Campus in 2025, retaining many of the original prison buildings.
- Interactive map of HMP Northeye
- Location: Bexhill-on-Sea, East Sussex, England; 50°50′52″N 000°24′32″E
- Security class: Category C training prison
- Opened: 1969
- Closed: 1992

H.M. Prison Northeye was a prison located at Bexhill-on-Sea, East Sussex, England which was in operation from 1969 to 1992.

== Royal Air Force use ==
The prison was formerly the site of a Royal Air Force Mobile Radio Unit which housed reserve equipment for the Chain Home radar station at Pevensey. It subsequently became a radar station itself, but was decommissioned in 1964. It was subsequently opened as a Category C training prison in January 1969.

== Prison disturbances ==
It was one of the prisons which participated in the prison strike organised by Preservation of the Rights of Prisoners in 1972.

In 1986, 40% of the prison was destroyed when 60 of the 450 inmates rioted in response to being locked in their cells for 23 hours a day during a Prison Officers' overtime ban.

== Later use and current plans ==
Following the prison's closure, the site was sold and used as training centre for students from the United Arab Emirates.

In May 2022, a local councillor said he had been told that the site had "been sold to house immigrants". The Government spent £15.4m buying back the land despite having sold it for £6.4m the year before.

In March 2023, the Government officially announced that it planned to use the site to house asylum seekers. A campaign group was set up by local residents to oppose the camp.

By December 2024 the Government had scrapped plans to use the site to house asylum seekers and future plans for the camp are currently unknown. Home Office permanent secretary Sir Matthew Rycroft said "we will be working with our colleagues to see if it would be suitable for any other part of government and, if not, then we will be selling it."
