= Rob Sorrenti =

British director, writer, and producer (born 1980)

- Born: 26 June 1980 (age 45); London, UK
- Occupation: Film director
- Years active: 2004–present

Rob Sorrenti (born 26 June 1980) is a British director, writer, and producer.

== Education ==
Sorrenti attended the Brit School of Performing Arts & Technology from 1996 –1998, and in 2000 graduated from the Ravensbourne School of Professional Broadcasting.

== Career ==
=== Documentaries ===
In 2021, Sorrenti documented former U.S. President Barack Obama at the COP26 United Nations Climate Change Conference in Glasgow.

In 2019, Sorrenti directed and produced Ocean Unite's 30x30 environmental campaign film. The film is narrated by Sir David Attenborough and features Sir Richard Branson and Shailene Woodley. The film premiered when David Attenborough was awarded the 2019 Chatham House Prize by Her Majesty The Queen.

In 2018, Sorrenti directed the story of The Kodiak Queen, a decorated WWII warship that survived Pearl Harbor, transformed into an artificial reef and dive site by Richard Branson. Narrated by Kate Winslet, the film reminds us of the momentous task that lies ahead in restoring the British Virgin Islands after the destruction of Hurricane Irma. It is currently on the film festival circuit and has been officially selected for over 20 film festivals, winning numerous awards including the ‘Green Planet Award Grand Prize Short’ at the Rhode Island International Film Festival and ‘Best of Show’ at the Impact Doc Awards (2019).

In 2017 Sorrenti created a charity film with Kate Winslet, showing the destruction Hurricane Irma inflicted on the British Virgin Islands.

In 2015, he made Ed Miliband A Portrait, a personal portrayal of Ed Miliband and his journey to becoming the Labour Party's candidate for Britain's prime minister. Commissioned by Labour and Oscar-nominated director Paul Greengrass, the documentary launched the party's 2015 election campaign.

In 2012, Sorrenti was commissioned by the London Organising Committee of the Olympic and Paralympic Games (LOCOG) and opening ceremony producer Stephen Daldry to make Spirit of the Olympics, a film about the London Olympics.

In 2004 Sorrenti produced and directed The Real Billy Elliot Diaries. The documentary tells the story of the three boys chosen to play Billy in Billy Elliot the Musical, composed by Elton John. The show was broadcast on ITV1.

=== Short films ===
Sorrenti's short film, Hollow - starring Martin McCann, Morven Christie, Haydn Gwynne and Nonso Anozie - explores the idea that love isn't always enough when it comes to getting clean. Hollow has been officially selected for over 30 film festivals and received several awards. Among those are three awards at the Oscar accredited Rhode Island International Film Festival (2011) including the coveted ‘Filmmaker of the Future’ award. Hollow also won the ‘People’s Choice Award’ at the Aesthetica Short Film Festival (2012).

Sorrenti's short film, Wednesday, is the story of a girl and boy born on the same day, at the same time, in the same hospital, whose paths cross again years later in the very same place. The film was executive produced by four-time Oscar-nominated director Stephen Daldry. Wednesday was selected for over 50 film festivals worldwide and received several awards, including ‘Best Short Film’ at the Fort Lauderdale Film Festival (2007) and ‘Best International Short’ at the Garden State Film Festival (2007).

=== Behind-the-scenes featurettes ===
In addition to his films and documentaries, Sorrenti has created behind-the-scenes featurettes for a number of feature films. These include United 93 (2006), The Bourne Ultimatum (2007), Jason Bourne (2016), The Mummy (2017), Mission: Impossible – Fallout (2018), Little Women (2019), El Camino: A Breaking Bad Movie (2019), Mission: Impossible – Dead Reckoning Part One (2023), and Mission: Impossible – The Final Reckoning (2025).

=== Feature film ===
He is set to direct the upcoming film Angels in the Asylum, based on his short film of the same name. The future of the film was put in uncertainty after being halted in February 2025 due to lack of funds.
