= David Foskett (academic) =

David Foskett (born 1951), OBE is a professor at the University of West London, England. Foskett is a member of the Academy of Culinary Arts and the Craft Guild of Chefs.

== Recognition ==
Foskett received the 2003 Education and Training Award, one of The Catey Awards for that year. In 2004, Foskett received a special award from the Craft Guild of Chefs for Outstanding Recognition and in 2007 he was awarded the grade "Chevalier dans l’Ordre du Mérite Agricole" from the President of France. In 2015 he was named "National Hero" by the Craft Guild of Chefs in recognition of his long years of service promoting the hospitality industry. In 2013 Foskett was a recipient of the Foodservice Order of Merit from the Catering Equipment Suppliers Association (CESA). In 2013 he also received the Public Sector Special Award from Cost Sector Catering.

In 2015 Foskett served as head judge at the first International Young Chef Olympiad. He also served as head judge at the second olympiad in 2016.

In 2002 and 2004 Foskett was involved in controversies regarding criticism of celebrity TV chefs Jamie Oliver and Gordon Ramsay.
