= Preservation of the Rights of Prisoners =

Prisoners' rights organisation

Preservation of the Rights of Prisoners (PROP) was a prisoners' rights organisation set up in the early 1970s in the United Kingdom, which organised more than one hundred prison demonstrations, strikes and protests.

== Formation ==
In the first five months of 1972 there were across the United Kingdom over fifty peaceful protests by prisoners. PROP was launched on 11 May 1972 in a public house, the Prince Arthur opposite Pentonville Prison, to "preserve, protect and to extend the rights of prisoners and ex-prisoners and to assist in their rehabilitation and re-integration into society, so as to bring about a reduction in crime."

PROP's foundation meeting was held in Hull and was attended by 60 people. Speakers included Norwegian sociologist Thomas Mathiesen, Jack Ashwell local branch secretary of the TGWU and Ros Kane from Radical Alternatives to Prison. The sociologist Mike Fitzgerald took on the role of press officer.

== Prison strike ==
Later, on 4 August 1972, PROP organise a 24-hour general strike in support of the demands in the PROP charter. Prop estimated the support at 10,000 prisoners in 33 prisons, the Home Office at half that.

The prisons listed by PROP were:

- HM Prison Albany
- HM Prison Birmingham
- HM Prison Blundeston
- HM Prison Bristol
- HM Prison Brixton
- HM Prison Camp Hill
- HM Prison Canterbury
- HM Prison Chelmsford
- HM Prison Coldingley
- HM Prison Dartmoor
- HM Prison Durham
- HM Prison Gartree
- HM Prison Gloucester
- HM Prison Haverigg
- HM Prison Hull
- HM Prison Lancaster
- HM Prison Leeds
- HM Prison Leicester
- HM Prison Lincoln
- HM Prison Liverpool
- HM Prison Long Lartin
- HM Prison Maidstone
- HM Prison Manchester
- HM Prison Northeye
- HM Prison Nottingham
- HM Prison Oxford
- HM Prison Parkhurst
- HM Prison Pentonville
- HM Prison Preston
- HM Prison Stafford
- HM Prison Wakefield
- HM Prison Wandsworth
- HM Prison Wormwood Scrubs

== Later history ==
PROP were active for a few years, it's not clear when the organisation closed.
