= Mike Fitzgerald (sociologist) =

Mike Fitzgerald (born 1951) is an English criminologist, former higher education manager and consultant. He was Vice-Chancellor of Thames Valley University in the 1990s.

== Background ==
Fitzgerald grew up on Merseyside. He attended Catholic grammar school in Crosby, Merseyside and gained entry to the University of Cambridge to read Social Sciences, graduating in the early 1970s. In 1977 he was awarded a PhD by the University of Leicester for Prisoners in Revolt a study which looked at the attempt by the organisation Preservation of the Rights of Prisoners to organise prisoners into a union.

== Scholarly work ==
Fitzgerald began an academic career in the 1970s at Leicester University sociology department as a tutorial assistant for two years. In 1975, he went to the Open University, as a lecturer in Social Policy. He helped build the social sciences faculty into one of the best in the UK, persuading Stuart Hall and other well-known sociologists to take up posts there. He was involved in the OU's innovative teaching modes and joint publications. He was an expert in the sociology of prisons and policing in Britain and internationally, publishing several books on these topics

== Academic management, and Thames Valley University ==
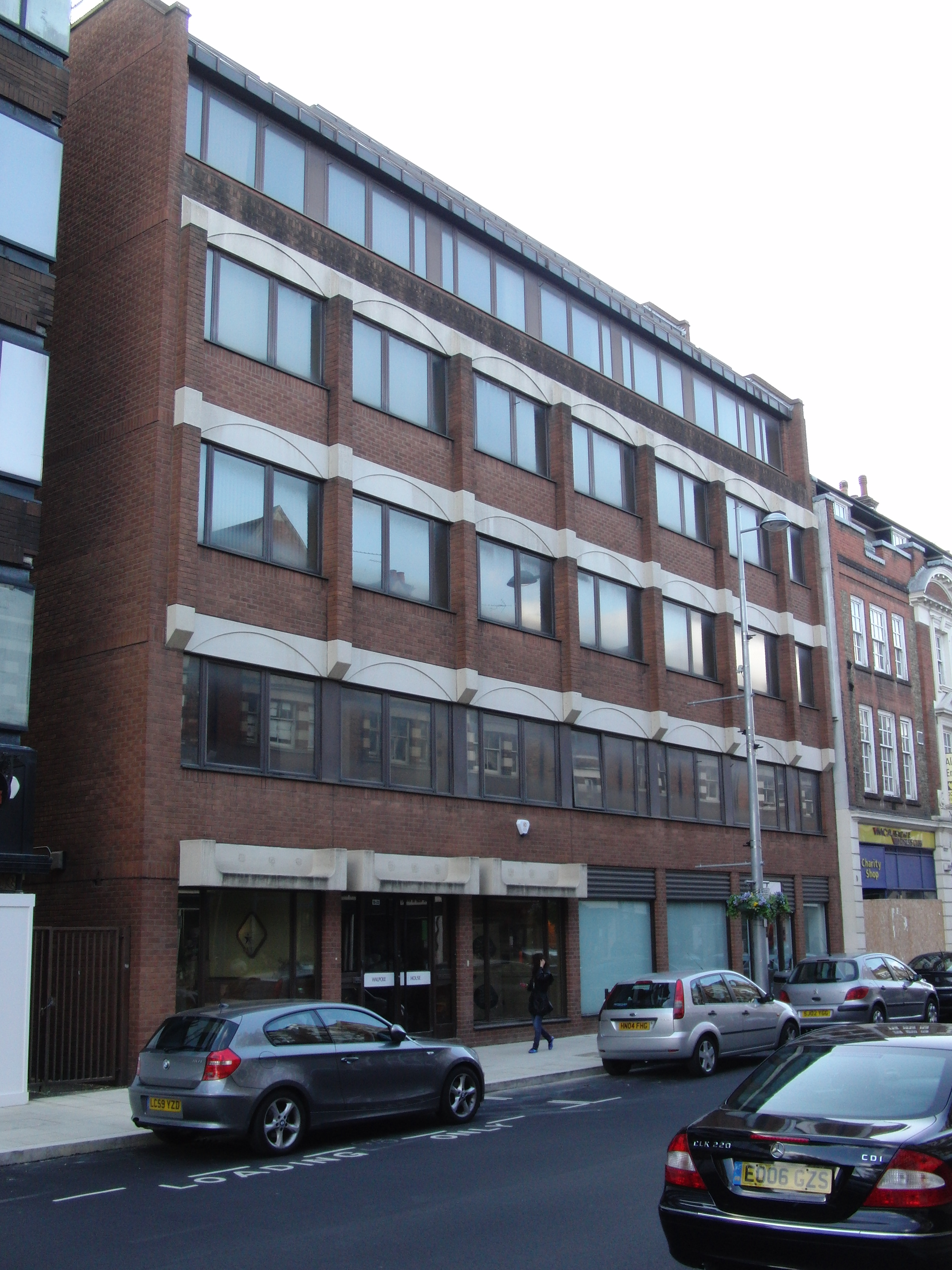
Walpole House in Ealing, housing the university's administration. Fitzgerald's office was actually in a different building in the 1990s

Fitzgerald latterly became Dean and Director of Studies in the Faculty of Social Sciences at the Open University, then left in 1987/8 to become deputy director for Academic Development at Coventry Polytechnic.

He was appointed Vice-Chancellor and Chief Executive of Thames Valley University (TVU) in 1991, at 41 years of age the youngest VC in Britain. TVU had been a college of higher education, then became a polytechnic and quickly applied for and received full university status.

His personal characteristics came to define the image and policies of the new university. He was known for his flamboyant style, sporting an earring, peroxide hair, Armani suits and drove a car with an M4TVU numberplate. His office had no desk, but a sofa and a jukebox. He was the first person ever to use a swearword on the front page of Times Higher Education in 1996. He was elected vice chair of the Committee of Vice-Chancellors and Principals in 1996. "At 45 he believes he is the youngest vice chancellor, but after five years at TVU – seeing it through a transformation from institute of higher education to polytechnic to university – he is far from the least experienced. Peer respect for the sharp mind behind a laddish exterior was signalled last week when the CVCP council chose him as vice chair in succession to David Melville of Middlesex University."

Fitzgerald was a passionate advocate for widening participation in higher education. In the mid-1990s, less than a third of eighteen-year-olds went into UK higher education. Fitzgerald used his experience at the Open University and in the polytechnic sector to create a new learning environment to support and sustain a mass system of higher education. As he had experienced at Cambridge and learnt at the Open University, assessment was a key vehicle for teaching itself, and so he argued for continuous, student-driven learning. He envisaged a "student driven university" led by a "New Learning Environment", which sought to use new media along with some traditional teaching, and whose learning outcomes were career-driven rather than classically academic and disciplinary in nature. He said: "Just as you need students to be active learners, so you need teachers to be active tutors. A lecture-driven model renders both teachers and learners passive." "...education is something you do; it's not something that happens to you. It is an active process". He initiated the Paul Hamlyn Learning Resource Centre at the Slough campus (now sold), and introduced new areas of study including courses in performance rock music, and digital technologies, computer animation and games. Though such courses are now commonplace, at the time they were held up as examples of "dumbing down" and lowering of standards.

Fitzgerald's changes, while prescient in many ways, were instituted rapidly. They were opposed by the staff union of TVU because they led to negative terms and conditions for employees, and poorer and rapidly changing conditions for academics. There were only two years during his tenure that no industrial action was held. He was frustrated that some academic staff were not on board with his vision of a "New Learning Environment".

Poor relations with some of the teaching staff, combined with the very rapid pace of change and reliance on new computer technologies, created the greatest problems for his management. A scandal over low pass marks for resit exam candidates was quickly redressed by Fitzgerald in October 1997. He also called in the Quality Assurance Agency. The industrial disputes with staff clearly had a negative impact on meeting marking deadlines, and thus on student progression. The QAA report gave negative evaluations of TVU's academic standards in many areas – registration, timetabling, validation, student support and assessment systems. The report said "The University chose to implement this vision of a New Learning Environment at the same time as it completely recast the underpinning academic-related administration. As we believe might have been anticipated, this subjected the institution, its staff and its systems, to stresses which it was not able to bear." Despite widespread suspicion that the QAA had sought to exercise its authority by exaggerating what had been an administrative crisis rather than finding any genuine loss of academic credibility, Fitzgerald resigned in 1998 after the QAA report was published and a management team led by first Sir William Taylor then Ken Barker took over, ironically initiating more staff redundancies and closures.

Fitzgerald worked as an education consultant, but in 2001 he underwent heart surgery, and has not worked since. He is no longer in the public eye, and the only mention of him in recent years has been as an occasional theatre critic at the Edinburgh Festivals.

== Media ==
Fitzgerald was well connected with Britain's 'New' Labour Party led by Tony Blair. Tony Blair and David Blunkett opened the Paul Hamlyn Learning Resource Centre on the Slough campus in 1996 with the rejoinder: 'Why, I wonder, can't every university be like TVU?'.

Fitzgerald made frequent appearances on British television. He also published regular columns on education policy.

Private Eye magazine ran a column about a "trendy Vice Chancellor" in the 1990s, based on Fitzgerald.
