= The Rumour (TV series) =

British television series

- Based on: The Rumour by Lesley Kara
- Screenplay by: Giula Sandler
- Directed by: Richard Clark
- Starring: Rachel Shenton; Emily Atack; Joanne Whalley
- Country of origin: United Kingdom
- Original language: English
- No. of series: 1
- No. of episodes: 5

Production
- Executive producers: Paul Testar; Sebastian Cardwell; Dixie Linder; Nick Marston; Rachel Gesua; Suzi McIntosh; Giula Sandler
- Producer: Dominic Barlow
- Running time: 48 minutes
- Production companies: Clapperboard; Cuba Pictures

Original release
- Network: Channel 5
- Release: 10 September – 18 September 2025

The Rumour is a British television series starring Rachel Shenton, Emily Atack and Joanne Whalley. It is adapted from the Lesley Kara novel of the same name. It was broadcast on Channel 5 from 10 to 18 September 2025.

== Synopsis ==
A mother newly moved to a small town thinks she discovers that a child killer is also living there.

== Cast ==
- Rachel Shenton as Joanna
- Emily Atack as Debbie
- Joanne Whalley as Bea
- Samuel Anderson as Michael
- Ellie Haddington as Liz
- Lucy Speed as Rachel
- Liza Sadovy as Kay
- Carryl Thomas as Fatima
- Tamzin Griffin as Sonia Martyns
- Alex Waldmann as Stephen
- Okezie Morro

== Production ==
The series is directed by Richard Clark from a screenplay by Giula Sandler adapted from the Lesley Kara novel of the same name. It is produced by Cuba Pictures and Clapperboard in association with Fremantle. Paul Testar, Sebastian Cardwell, Dixie Linder, Nick Marston, Rachel Gesua, Suzi McIntosh as well as Sandler are executive producers. Dominic Barlow is series producer. The novel had originally been optioned by Cuba Pictures in 2018.

The cast is led by Rachel Shenton, Emily Atack and Joanne Whalley. Filming took place in late 2024 near Budapest, Hungary.
