= Claire Gorham =

English journalist and television presenter

Claire Gorham (born 1967), sometimes credited as Clare Gorham, is an English journalist and television presenter. She is best known for presenting The Girlie Show in the 1990s.

She is a transracial adoptee, born to a Swiss mother and a Nigerian father. Her family has five born-to children and four adopted children of whom two are black. She has spoken about transracial adoption on a number of occasions.

== Career ==
She was one of the original presenters of The Girlie Show on Channel 4 and presented Travelog 97. She has also been the editor of the British Black lifestyle magazine Pride.

She appeared as an actress in Random Acts of Intimacy (2002).

She is currently a lecturer in Broadcast Journalism at the University of West London.
