= Sarah Cawood =

British television presenter, voice over artist and narrator

- Born: Sarah Louise Cawood; 7 August 1972 (age 53); St Pancras, London, England
- Education: Stamford High School; Royal Ballet School; Arts Educational Schools London
- Occupations: Television presenter, voice over artist and narrator
- Years active: 1995–2014, 2020–
- Television: The Girlie Show; Night Fever; Live & Kicking; Top of the Pops; Comic Relief Does Fame Academy
- Spouse: Andy Merry (m. 2012)
- Children: 2

Sarah Louise Cawood (born 7 August 1972) is an English television presenter, voice over artist and narrator. She is best known for presenting the BBC children's Saturday morning show Live & Kicking.

== Career ==
Cawood grew up in the Cambridgeshire village of Maxey. and was educated at Stamford High School, Lincolnshire. She also attended the Royal Ballet School and Arts Educational Schools London.

Between 1995 and 1996, she was a presenter for Nickelodeon. In 1997, she moved on to co-present The Girlie Show. From 1998 to 2000, she featured on Channel 5's Karaoke quiz show, Night Fever. She has also presented on MTV, Live & Kicking and Top of the Pops. She was also a panellist on Lily Savage's Blankety Blank on 2001 and Loose Women in 2003. She has also co-presented the midweek and Saturday National Lottery programmes and was also a reporter on the Channel 4 show Richard & Judy. In addition to this, she presented an information video for Argos for staff training purposes.

In 1998, she took on an acting role, appearing as Angel in Todd Haynes's glam-rock drama Velvet Goldmine.

In May 2006, it was while she was presenting the National Lottery Jet Set alongside Eamonn Holmes that Fathers 4 Justice invaded the studio; she however carried on and later claimed it was her training on MTV which allowed her to 'ad-lib'. She won a Celebrity episode of The Weakest Link, beating cricketer Phil Tufnell in the final. In November 2006, she took part in the BBC's Celebrity Scissorhands for Children in Need.

She co-presented BBC Three's coverage of Comic Relief Does Fame Academy. She also co-commentated on the semi-finals of the Eurovision Song Contest 2007, 2009 and 2010 alongside Paddy O'Connell for viewers in the United Kingdom on BBC Three. Additionally, she starred as the 'hidden' celebrity in an episode of the CBBC show Hider in the House.

She presented the UK version of the word-based quiz show That's the Question on Challenge which began airing on 14 May 2007.

She was a panellist on The Wright Stuff in 2007, and returned in early January 2010.

She is also the voice-over on ITV's Daily Cooks Challenge hosted by Antony Worrall Thompson.

On 10 November 2010, she and Alice Cooper co-presented the Classic Rock Roll of Honour Awards at the Roundhouse in London.

On 6 January 2014, Cawood joined Dave Taylor to present the breakfast show on Heart East Anglia from 6 am til 10 am. Sarah Cawood decided to leave the show in December 2014 to look after her children.

In 2026 she joined the team of Continuity Announcers on the Sky TV channel, "Challenge"

== Personal life ==
On 27 March 2012, Cawood gave birth to her first child, a son. In December 2012, Cawood married her long-term partner. In August 2013, Cawood gave birth to her second child, a daughter.

On 22 September 2022, Cawood announced that she had been diagnosed with stage I breast cancer in August 2021, and that she had made a full recovery.
