= Peter John (educationist) =

British academic and educator

Professor Peter John CBE FBA
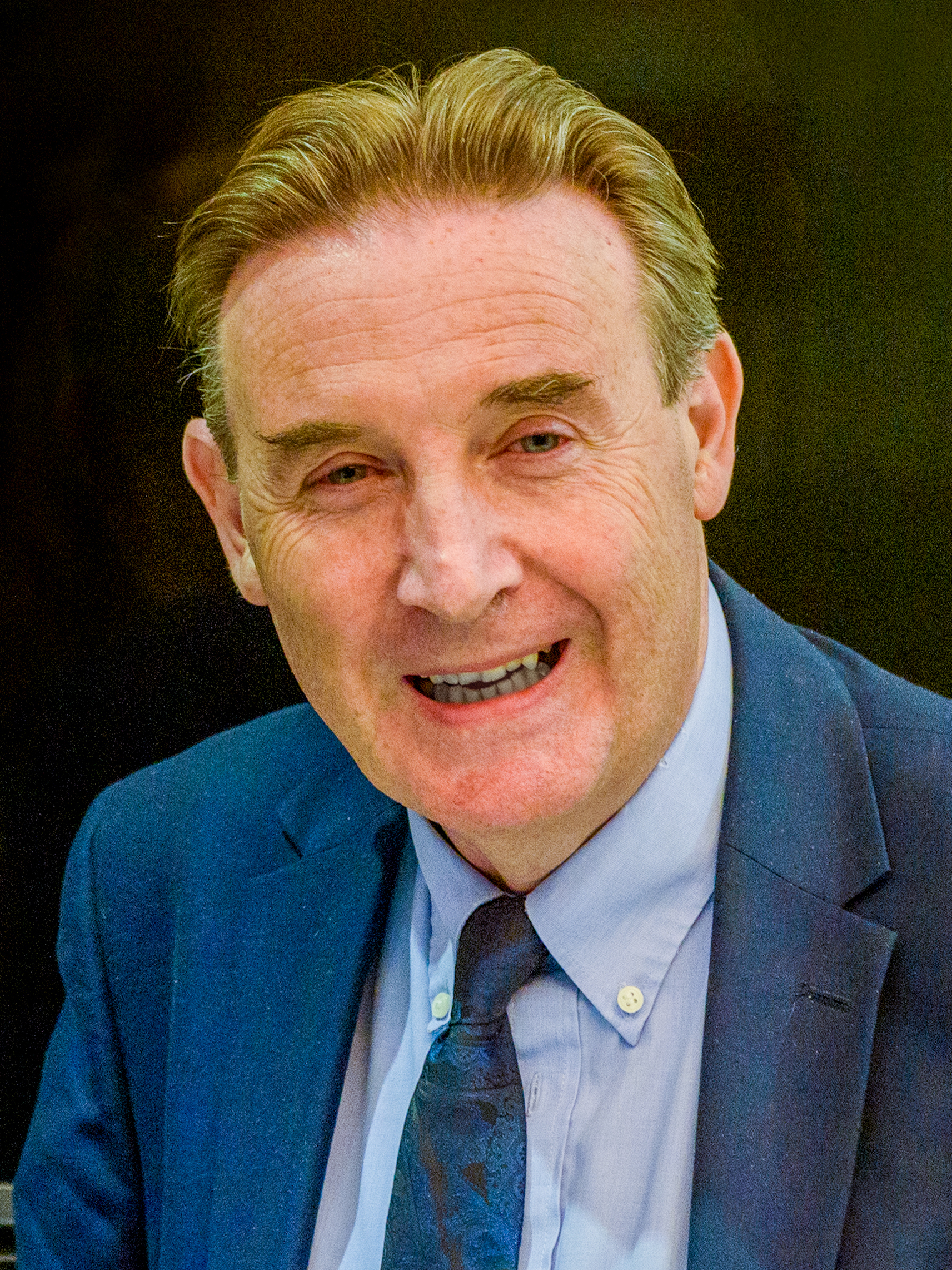
- John in 2021
- Title: Vice Chancellor University of West London
- Term: 2017–present

Peter David John CBE FBA is a British academic and educator. He is the Vice Chancellor of the University of West London. He previously served as the Pro-Vice Chancellor and the Deputy Vice Chancellor of the University of Plymouth.

A former historian, John earned a doctorate from the University of Bristol and later became an educationist.

John was named in the 2020 UK New Year Honors List for his work and service to higher education.
