= Kai Alexander =

English actor (born 1997)

- Alexander in 2024
- Born: Kai Alexander; Worcester, England
- Education: ArtsEd
- Occupation: Actor
- Years active: 2017–present

Kai Alexander is an English actor. He gained recognition for his standout performances portraying Lyle Jennings in Dept. Q (2025) and World War II veteran Sgt. William Quinn in the Steven Spielberg and Tom Hanks war drama, Masters of the Air. He is set to appear in the upcoming comedy feature, Anxious People.

== Early life and education ==
Alexander was born and raised in the Midlands. A musician from a young age, he learned piano as a child and later played drums in youth jazz orchestras. As a child Kai appeared in a Honey Monster TV commercial directed by Garth Jennings. At 16, he relocated to London after earning a place at the Arts Educational Schools (ArtsEd) to train in acting.

== Career ==
After leaving drama school, Alexander landed his first lead screen role as William in the BBC Three drama short Oakwood. In 2017, he joined the cast of the award winning Channel 4 comedy Catastrophe in the recurring role of Jeffrey, the on-screen child of characters played by Ashley Jensen and Mark Bonnar. In 2019, he reprised his role in the fourth and final season of Catastrophe and later appeared in Netflix's The Stranger, an adaptation of the novel by Harlan Coben.

In 2022, he portrayed Richard Branson in the Hulu and Disney+ miniseries Pistol, directed by Danny Boyle and created by Craig Pearce. Alongside Karen Gillan, he was cast to voice a lead role in the unreleased animated series Rhona Who Lives by the River also for Disney alongside 20th Television Animation.

Alexander played Sgt. William Quinn in the 2024 Apple TV WWII miniseries, Masters of the Air, produced by Steven Spielberg, Tom Hanks and Gary Goetzman. Esquire described Alexander's performance as his "big break". The role required extensive physical training, with Alexander performing all of his own stunts, including a parachute sequence.

In 2025, he played Lyle Jennings in Scott Frank's adaptation of Jussi Adler-Olsen's Dept. Q for Netflix, receiving critical praise for his "spellbinding" portrayal.He subsequently joined the cast of Angels in the Asylum, starring Simon Pegg and Wind of Change, a biopic focusing on the German rock band Scorpions.

In 2026, he was reported to have joined the cast of Sam Mendes's upcoming series of biopic films of The Beatles for Sony Pictures. He will next appear alongside Angelina Jolie and Jason Segel in Anxious People, a feature film adaptation of the 2019 novel by Fredrik Backman, directed by Marc Forster.

== Filmography ==
=== Film ===
Year	Title	Role	Notes
TBA	Wind of Change †	TBA	Post-production
TBA	Angels in the Asylum †	TBA	Suspended production
TBA	Anxious People †	TBA	Post-production
2028	The Beatles – A Four-Film Cinematic Event †	TBA	Filming

=== Television ===
Year	Title	Role	Notes
2017–2019	Catastrophe	Jeffrey Beasley	4 episodes
2020	The Stranger	Dante Gunnarsson	Miniseries
2022	Pistol	Richard Branson	Miniseries
2024	Masters of the Air	Sgt. William Quinn	Miniseries
2025	Dept. Q	Lyle Jennings	Miniseries
TBA	Rhona Who Lives by the River †	Knox	Animated series

†	Denotes productions that have not yet been released
