= Catastrophe (2015 TV series) =

British television sitcom

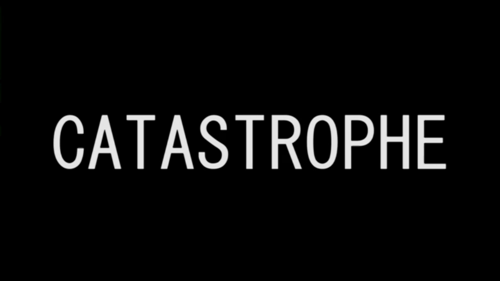
- Genre: Sitcom; Romantic comedy; Dark comedy; Slice of life; Sex comedy; Comedy-drama
- Created by: Rob Delaney; Sharon Horgan
- Written by: Rob Delaney; Sharon Horgan
- Directed by: Ben Taylor; Jim O'Hanlon
- Starring: Sharon Horgan; Rob Delaney
- Composer: Oli Julian
- Country of origin: United Kingdom
- Original language: English
- No. of series: 4
- No. of episodes: 24

Production
- Executive producers: Rob Delaney; Sharon Horgan; Richard Allen-Turner; Kara Baker; Jon Thoday
- Producers: Adam Tandy; Jack Bayles
- Running time: 24–28 minutes
- Production companies: Merman; Birdbath Productions; Avalon Television

Original release
- Network: Channel 4
- Release: 19 January 2015 – 12 February 2019

Catastrophe is a British television sitcom which was first broadcast on 19 January 2015 on Channel 4, and began full-season streaming on 19 June 2015 on Amazon Prime Video in the United States. It is created, written by, and stars Sharon Horgan and Rob Delaney, who portray single people Sharon and Rob who become a couple after Sharon unexpectedly becomes pregnant following a fling while Rob is visiting London on a business trip. Carrie Fisher, Ashley Jensen and Mark Bonnar play supporting characters in the series.

The show was renewed for a second series in January 2015 and began broadcasting from 27 October 2015, having been brought forward from its original schedule of early 2016. In July 2016, Catastrophe was renewed for a third and fourth series. The third series began broadcasting in the UK on 28 February 2017, comprises six episodes. The fourth and final series of the show began broadcasting on 8 January 2019; premiering on March 15, 2019, in the US.

For her performance in the show, Sharon Horgan was nominated for a BAFTA Award for Best Female Comedy Performance in 2016. Both Horgan and Delaney won the BAFTA TV Award for Best Writer: Comedy. The show was nominated for a Peabody Award. In July 2016, the show received a Primetime Emmy Award nomination for Outstanding Writing For a Comedy Series for Horgan and Delaney.

== Synopsis ==
Irish primary school teacher Sharon (Sharon Horgan) is single and lives in London. She meets single American advertising executive Rob (Rob Delaney) in a bar whilst he is visiting London on a business trip. They have a six-day fling and he returns to his home town, Boston. She discovers that she is pregnant by him. After she informs him of that, he moves to London and they become a couple. They marry shortly before she gives birth to their son. They later have a daughter.

== Cast ==
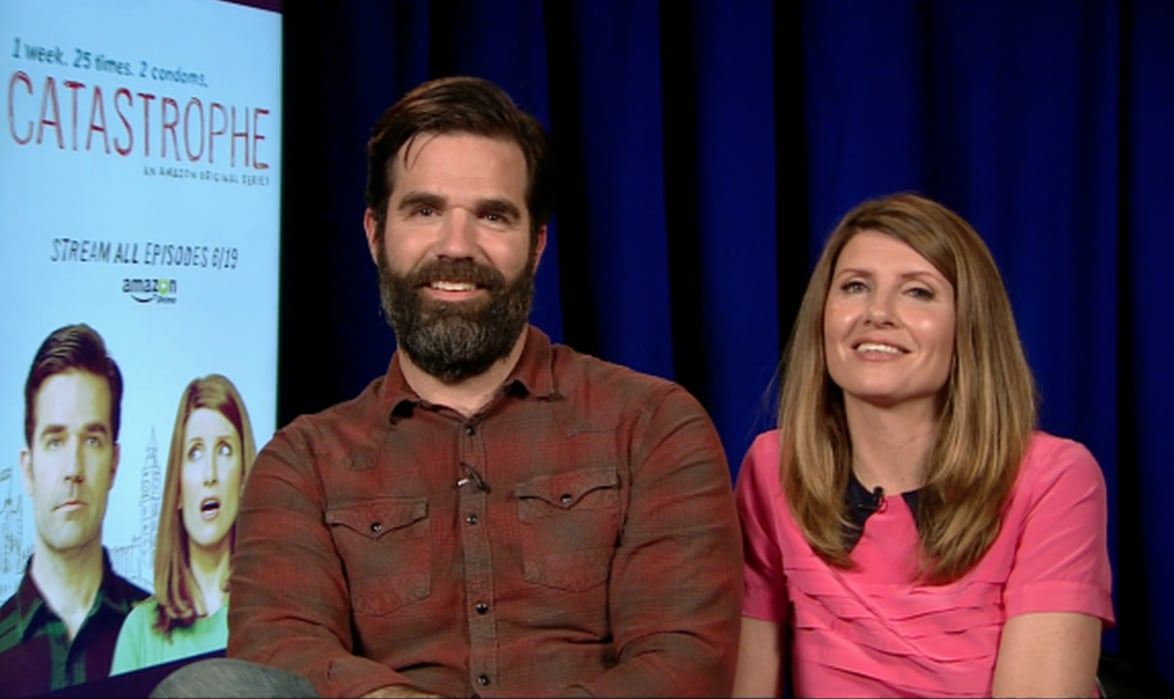
Rob Delaney and Sharon Horgan interviewed about Catastrophe in 2015

=== Main ===
- Sharon Horgan as Sharon Morris
- Rob Delaney as Rob Norris

=== Recurring ===
- Ashley Jensen as Fran, Sharon's friend
- Mark Bonnar as Chris, Fran's husband
- Carrie Fisher as Mia Norris, Rob's mother (series 1–3)
- Frances Tomelty as Carol Morris, Sharon's mother
- Gary Lilburn as Des Morris, Sharon's father (series 1–3)
- Jonathan Forbes as Fergal Morris, Sharon's brother
- Daniel Lapaine as Dave, Rob's friend
- Eileen Walsh as Kate, Sharon's friend.
- Tobias Menzies as Dr. Harries
- Sarah Niles as Melissa, Sharon's co-worker
- Marta Barrio as Mallandra, Fergal's wife
- Seeta Indrani as Harita
- Emmanuelle Bouaziz as Olivia
- Amanda Hale as Catherine, Dave's girlfriend
- Lauren Socha as Anna
- Kai Alexander as Jeffrey, Fran & Chris's son (series 3–4)
- Michaela Watkins as Sydney Norris, Rob's sister (series 4)

== Production and broadcast ==
The series was officially commissioned by Channel 4 in May 2014 after a successful pilot the previous year. The BBC had previously turned down the series after reading the script.

Catastrophe was named after the following quotation from the movie Zorba the Greek. "I'm a man, so I married. Wife, children, house, everything. The full catastrophe."

The original theme for the series, "Catastrophe Theme", was composed by Oli Julian.

On 28 January 2015, the show was renewed for a second series, which aired in October 2015. Jay Hunt, Channel 4's chief creative officer, said: "Catastrophe is a real comedy gem. Sharon and Rob have done a magnificent job and we're already looking forward to series two".

Season 3 was filmed in late 2016. Carrie Fisher, who plays Mia, died on 27 December 2016 shortly after filming of series 3 of Catastrophe had concluded. This was her final TV role. The final episode of series 3 is dedicated to her, with the simple words "For Carrie" appearing on screen alongside a photograph of Fisher following the credits.

Series 4 was filmed in early to mid 2018 and was the series' last.

For series 4, production visited Beacon House in Whitstable, Kent, which doubled as a house in Boston, and was used for the filming of Mia's (Carrie Fisher) funeral. Another location in Whitstable which featured in the filming was The Lobster Shack. The Pantiles in Royal Tunbridge Wells also featured and doubled as Boston.

== Episodes ==
=== Series 1 (2015) ===
No. overall	No. in series	Title	Directed by	Written by	Original release date	UK viewers (millions)
1	1	"Episode 1"	Ben Taylor	Rob Delaney & Sharon Horgan	19 January 2015	1.10
Irish primary school teacher Sharon meets American businessman and recovering alcoholic Rob at a bar in London. They spend six days together in which they have casual sex every day. He returns to Boston, but when Sharon phones him 32 days later to tell him that she is pregnant, he returns and suggests that they try to establish a permanent relationship. They visit a doctor who tells them the pregnancy needs close monitoring and that Sharon has cervical dysplasia. They accept an invitation to dinner with Sharon's married friends Fran and Chris. Rob argues with Fran after she claims that homeopathy works. On their return to Sharon's flat, Rob proposes to her, despite not having an engagement ring.
2	2	"Episode 2"	Ben Taylor	Rob Delaney & Sharon Horgan	26 January 2015	1.17
Few people think it a good idea that Rob marry Sharon. His American mother, Mia, telephones and tells him to come home and forget about the pregnancy, because the authorities cannot chase him for child support there. He tells Mia that he is having a son and will raise him. Rob phones Dave, an American who is his only friend in London; he is puzzled by Rob's intention to marry Sharon. Rob and Sharon visit her brother Fergal, who is accepting and encourages the new couple to marry. Rob and Fergal go to a jeweller, where Fergal helps Rob choose a ring. Rob and Sharon go to a restaurant, where they are interrupted by Dave. Rob and Sharon leave, and Rob proposes to her in the street, with the ring.
3	3	"Episode 3"	Ben Taylor	Rob Delaney & Sharon Horgan	2 February 2015	1.17
Sharon awakes in the night worrying about her pregnancy, and the state of the world. She is frequently simultaneously horny and depressed. In a bookshop, she bumps into old flame Owen, whom she dumped years ago. Owen takes her to dinner at a restaurant. Owen tells her that he is in a long-term relationship with a successful author who is now pregnant by him. His success makes Sharon feel like a failure. Rob is having problems generating business for the advertising agency. Whilst shopping, he sees Fran, so avoids her and is pleased to run into Chris. Chris suggests he change career path to become a vet - which is what he wanted to do before he went into advertising. When Rob asks Sharon what she thinks of his plan to study and become a vet in a zoo, she strongly discourages him from doing so.
4	4	"Episode 4"	Ben Taylor	Rob Delaney & Sharon Horgan	9 February 2015	0.90
Rob meets Sharon's parents, who are accepting of the engagement but less so about the pregnancy. Sharon is told that, because she is 41, she has a multiple times higher than average risk of her baby having Down syndrome. Chris tells Rob that Fran suspected him of having an affair, so Chris told her that he has been spending time with Rob. Fran and Rob meet in the park, during which Fran says that she would like to be friends with him and Sharon. Fran kisses Rob, then he pushes her away and runs off. Fran later tells Sharon who teases Rob, but accepts his version of events.
5	5	"Episode 5"	Ben Taylor	Rob Delaney & Sharon Horgan	16 February 2015	0.93
Rob is fired from the advertising agency in Boston via Skype for not landing any clients for his London venture, but Dave gets him an interview—and a job offer—with a chemical firm of dubious reputation. Dave unsuccessfully encourages Rob to join him for a prostate massage at a brothel. Sharon calls Rob's mother Mia to invite her to the wedding and is shocked to hear something Rob never told her—that his former girlfriend Betsy miscarried what would have been their baby. Sharon looks for Betsy online. After the couple celebrate Sharon's birthday with friends and relatives, they have a heart-to-heart conversation which almost clears the air.
6	6	"Episode 6"	Ben Taylor	Rob Delaney & Sharon Horgan	23 February 2015	0.93
Rob asks Sharon's brother Fergal to be his best man, which Fergal accepts. Fergal has been drunk for days, his wife Mallandra having left him. Sharon chooses Kate, who was her friend at university and who is now unhappily married, as her maid of honour. Kate is annoyingly excitable, gets drunk and goes missing on the hen night, having met a man who says he has a boat. Rob's stag night, organised by Dave at a pole dancing club, fares no better, as Fergal argues with Dave, and Chris meets an old flame, Lenore, who is one of the dancers there. At the register office, Sharon is angry with Kate for going missing, and Fran takes Kate's place as maid of honour. Fran sings badly during the service. The couple argue in their hotel room during the honeymoon, then Sharon's waters break.

=== Series 2 (2015) ===
No. overall	No. in series	Title	Directed by	Written by	Original release date	UK viewers (millions)
7	1	"Episode 1"	Ben Taylor	Rob Delaney & Sharon Horgan	27 October 2015	1.43
Rob and Sharon argue. They then have sex, during which their son Frankie and their dog Mabel walk in. Sharon gives birth to a daughter, whom they name Muireann. The couple host a gathering of family and friends, which is marred by an argument between Rob's mother Mia and Sharon. Sharon's father Des shows signs of confusion and leaves the front door open and Mabel runs into the road where she is killed by a car.
8	2	"Episode 2"	Ben Taylor	Rob Delaney & Sharon Horgan	3 November 2015	1.43
Rob is attracted to a new French colleague Olivia Vasseur, who has recently transferred from the company's Paris office. She tells him that she has noticed him looking at her and that she wants to fellate him. He tells his manager Harita that he is quitting, but Harita convinces him to stay by offering him a large pay increase. Sharon is unpleasant and unpopular at the mother and baby group that she attends. She is disappointed when she finds out that her only friend there, Samantha, has left and returned to her job. She meets up with Samantha and has a brief conversation with her, but Samantha finds her needy and soon rejects her.
9	3	"Episode 3"	Ben Taylor	Rob Delaney & Sharon Horgan	10 November 2015	1.50
Chris tells Rob that Fran has taken a lover and that he intends to divorce her. He tells Rob about his own long-standing desire to have sex with "women who have penises". Fran tells Sharon about how Chris's lack of sexual interest in her has led to her having an affair and her decision to divorce him. Chris briefly visits a gay bar. Rob is disappointed with having too little sex for his liking. He and Sharon take a trip to Paris in order to improve their relationship whilst Fergal and Mallandra babysit Frankie and Muireann. Fergal asks Rob for a loan of £10,000. Rob and Sharon encounter a series of mishaps after Sharon leaves her breast pump at home. Rob and Sharon have a couples' massage; Sharon is annoyed when the masseur massages her breasts. Rob and Sharon have sex.
10	4	"Episode 4"	Ben Taylor	Rob Delaney & Sharon Horgan	17 November 2015	1.23
Fran and Chris have separated. He visits a transgender sex worker, whom he pays £120 for a half-hour session. Fran goes on an uncomfortable first date with a middle-aged man, Patrick. He tries to propose in a restaurant - until she stops him. Later, Chris phones Fran and tries to persuade her to reunite. Rob and Sharon tell each other that they have never cheated on each other. They hire a babysitter before attempting to enjoy their third wedding anniversary at the same restaurant just after they bumped into Fran and Patrick leaving. Rob tells Sharon how difficult he has found transitioning from being a single man living in Boston to being a married father living in London. Dave is a recovering alcoholic and has cirrhosis. He is pleased with his new girlfriend Catherine, but reluctant to meet her friends. When he does, she is angry with him after finding out that he has only been sober for five months, rather than the year that he claimed.
11	5	"Episode 5"	Ben Taylor	Rob Delaney & Sharon Horgan	24 November 2015	1.02
Rob is called into a meeting with Harita, Olivia and an HR representative. Olivia accuses him of sexually harassing her. Rob angrily denies it and takes a leave of absence. He returns home and tells Sharon.
12	6	"Episode 6"	Ben Taylor	Rob Delaney & Sharon Horgan	1 December 2015	1.04
Rob leaves the family home, Sharon is furious at finding out about the sexual harassment claim at work. Rob initially moves in with Dave, but finds his drug fuelled lifestyle too chaotic. He rents a hotel room, and starts drinking, breaking his long sober period. Whilst drunk, Dave calls him. When Rob arrives he finds him unconscious after overdosing and takes him to the hospital. Sharon goes to a bar with Kate and gets drunk. The next day, she reconciles with Rob. Kate tells her that she disappeared with a young student, an encounter that she doesn't remember. She takes a morning after pill, and later that evening Rob finds the receipt.

=== Series 3 (2017) ===
No. overall	No. in series	Title	Directed by	Written by	Original release date	UK viewers (millions)
13	1	"Episode 1"	Ben Taylor	Rob Delaney & Sharon Horgan	28 February 2017	1.48
Rob confronts Sharon about the morning after pill and becomes suspicious. Sharon goes to a bar with Kate to see the student and find out what happened the night they were together. Sharon finds out that while she apparently kissed him and touched his penis, they did not have sex. Rob is offered his old job back but refuses.
14	2	"Episode 2"	Ben Taylor	Rob Delaney & Sharon Horgan	7 March 2017	1.23
Rob and Sharon's relationship continues to suffer as they attempt to sort out childcare arrangements following Sharon's return to teaching. Rob searches for a new job whilst attempting to deal with playground politics. Fergal announces that he and his wife will be moving to Spain. Sharon is promoted at her school due to a fellow teacher killing himself.
15	3	"Episode 3"	Ben Taylor	Rob Delaney & Sharon Horgan	14 March 2017	1.19
Financial difficulties continue to put stress on Rob and Sharon, so they consider selling their current home, and downsizing to a smaller one. Rob struggles with weight and joins a gym. Fran deals with vanity issues and considers plastic surgery as a way to kick-start a new life.
16	4	"Episode 4"	Ben Taylor	Rob Delaney & Sharon Horgan	21 March 2017	1.25
Rob and Sharon have a weird dinner experience with estranged couple Fran and Chris. Catherine confronts Dave with the shocking revelation that she is pregnant. Sharon's parents visit and Fergal is back from Spain. Rob returns to his old job while Sharon gets some unexpected news from the doctor.
17	5	"Episode 5"	Ben Taylor	Rob Delaney & Sharon Horgan	28 March 2017	1.11
Rob officially returns to work and has some awkward encounters with his co-workers. Des has a stroke, prompting Sharon and Fergal to travel back to Ireland where family tensions intensify. Rob is left alone to look after the kids. Chris confronts and threatens Fran's new boyfriend.
18	6	"Episode 6"	Ben Taylor	Rob Delaney & Sharon Horgan	4 April 2017	1.07
Everyone gathers for Des's funeral. Mia arrives from America and develops an odd friendship with Carol before taking up residence at Rob and Sharon's, greatly annoying both of them. After Chris's threats, Fran gets dumped by her boyfriend, and she gets very upset, and knocks on Chris's door, and punches him in the nose. Rob picks up a drunken Sharon from a bar, and they head home. However, Sharon decides she wants to order some pizza, so Rob drops her off. While Rob looks for a place to park, his car gets hit by another car. Although bleeding, he is still conscious, and confesses to Sharon that he has been drinking again, and will fail the breathalyser test that the police will give him, due to the accident.

=== Series 4 (2019) ===
No. overall	No. in series	Title	Directed by	Written by	Original release date	UK viewers (millions)
19	1	"Episode 1"	Jim O'Hanlon	Rob Delaney & Sharon Horgan	8 January 2019	1.45
Rob is convicted of drunk-driving, resulting in a sentence of community service working at a cerebral palsy charity shop and attending Alcoholics Anonymous meetings. At AA, he meets Amanda (Julie Hesmondhalgh), a middle-aged woman who walks with a limp. She tells him that her husband was killed in a house fire that she accidentally started while inebriated. She also tells him that her limp was caused by flying glass from Rob's car crash. She stalks him, then Rob goes to her house where he discovers that her husband is in fact alive and that she is faking her limp. Sharon swaps price tags in shops in order to buy things for much lower prices. She is caught by staff on the second occasion, but they do not call the police. Rob sees Sharon's behaviour as a cry for help.
20	2	"Episode 2"	Jim O'Hanlon	Rob Delaney & Sharon Horgan	15 January 2019	1.29
Rob's sister Sidney and her latest foster child visit from the United States and stay with Rob and Sharon. Rob decides to accompany Sidney to a Quaker meeting, and considers becoming a Quaker. Fran asks Sharon to join her for moral support as they attend Jeffrey's theatrical event where Chris will be there with his girlfriend. At school, a male pupil of Sharon's has repeatedly been wetting himself in her class. Sharon later finds out from his parents that he is too afraid of her to raise his hand to be excused. Rob and Sharon are mystified by Sidney's insistence of bringing her own vegetables to dinner for her son. Dave drops by for dinner but cannot contain his swearing in the presence of children.
21	3	"Episode 3"	Jim O'Hanlon	Rob Delaney & Sharon Horgan	22 January 2019	1.22
Rob finally gets a clean bill of health but urges Sharon to get a check up. When Sharon visits her less-than-sympathetic local GP, she realises that she is not in the peak condition she imagined. Sharon initially joins Rob jogging outdoors, who subsequently has juice squirted at him by one of a group of teenage boys. Sharon then joins Fran in her regular military-like regimented workouts whose instructors post less than flattering photos of her in action on social media. Dave invites Rob and Sharon to his new home. Fran engages in a new weekly activity. Chris has a heart-to-heart talk with Jeffrey regarding his break-up with Fran. Sharon gets Rob a new piece of clothing.
22	4	"Episode 4"	Jim O'Hanlon	Rob Delaney & Sharon Horgan	29 January 2019	1.19
Rob wakes from a nightmare but then feels playful toward half-awake Sharon. Fergal arrives to celebrate his upcoming 40th birthday but is critical of Sharon who is organising the party. Sharon's mother also arrives in town for the party, accompanied by her new boyfriend. Rob chooses not to attend the party, while the party itself is full of surprises. Fran is envious of Chris regarding their respective futures. Rob has a change of heart, choosing to go the party after all, but is encountered by heavy traffic. Rob finally arrives, just as the paramedics are. Sharon ponders whether her mother is having more sex now than she is.
23	5	"Episode 5"	Jim O'Hanlon	Rob Delaney & Sharon Horgan	5 February 2019	1.23
Sharon is unsettled by the new headmaster sitting on her desk at school, and by a patch of fluid which she notices immediately afterwards. She wrongly assumes it to be his semen, until it is discovered to be caused by a leak from a pipe several feet above. Sharon is nevertheless still very uncomfortable with her new headmaster, and expresses these feelings to him in a meeting. Dave is shocked to hear that his wife wants to leave him. Rob's big boss visits London and the two hit it off, so much so that he eventually offers Harita's job to Rob. Rob turns the position down, partly because he thinks that is the decision that Sharon would want him to make. Fran and Chris decide to try to get together again.
24	6	"Episode 6"	Jim O'Hanlon	Rob Delaney & Sharon Horgan	12 February 2019	1.35
Sharon, Rob, and their children go to Boston for a family holiday. They are greeted at the airport by Rob's sister. She tells him that Mia (their mother) died. When Rob and his sister are trying to coordinate the funeral arrangements, he is annoyed with Sharon wanting to continue their holiday as if nothing had happened. When Rob's father turns up for the funeral, he says that his yellow skin is caused by cirrhosis. Rob and Sharon's relationship becomes tenser both before and after the funeral, with Rob expressing his dissatisfaction with their marriage and his life in London. He tells her that he has been offered a job in Boston which he wants to take. Although opposed at first, Sharon agrees that he should take it and she will move to Boston with him. On a beach, with their children asleep in their car, Sharon confesses that she is pregnant. She strips to her underwear and gets in the sea to swim. Rob sees a sign warning of strong riptides and forbidding swimming. He joins her in the sea and they kiss. The final shot pans out from their embrace, showing they are now, far out to sea and swimming towards shore.

== Broadcast ==
The series was first broadcast in the UK on Channel 4 from January 2015. In the United States, the series was first shown exclusively on Amazon Prime Instant Video, with the first series added in June 2015. Amazon Studios vice president Roy Price said: "Rob and Sharon have created an engaging, contemporary, funny and moving story. We are excited to bring Catastrophe exclusively to our Amazon Prime customers, and can't wait to hear what they think of the series." The show has also been sold to numerous other countries. In Australia it is shown on Australian Broadcasting Corporation, in Canada it ran on Shomi until the video on demand service ceased operation, and in New Zealand on SoHo.

== Accolades ==
Year	Award	Category	Nominee(s)	Result	Ref.
2015	Writers' Guild of Great Britain Awards	Best TV Situation Comedy	Rob Delaney and Sharon Horgan	Nominated	
2015	BAFTA Scotland Awards	Best Actor in Television	Mark Bonnar	Nominated	
2016	Critics' Choice Television Awards	Best Comedy Series	Catastrophe	Nominated	
2016	BAFTA TV Craft Awards	Best Writer: Comedy	Rob Delaney and Sharon Horgan	Won	
2016	BAFTA TV Awards	Best Female Comedy Performance	Sharon Horgan	Nominated	
2016	BAFTA Scotland Awards	Best Actress in Television	Ashley Jensen	Nominated	
2016	Primetime Emmy Awards	Outstanding Writing for a Comedy Series	Rob Delaney and Sharon Horgan (for "Episode 1")	Nominated	
2016	Critics' Choice Television Awards	Most Bingeworthy Show	Catastrophe	Nominated	
2016	Royal Television Society Awards	Scripted Comedy	Catastrophe	Won	
2016	Royal Television Society Awards	Comedy Performance	Sharon Horgan and Rob Delaney	Nominated	
2016	Royal Television Society Awards	Writer: Comedy	Sharon Horgan and Rob Delaney	Won	
2016	Satellite Awards	Best Actor in a Musical or Comedy Series	Rob Delaney	Nominated	
2016	Satellite Awards	Best Actress in a Musical or Comedy Series	Sharon Horgan	Nominated	
2017	Primetime Emmy Awards	Outstanding Guest Actress in a Comedy Series	Carrie Fisher (for "Episode 6")	Nominated	
2017	Royal Television Society Awards	Scripted Comedy	Catastrophe	Nominated	
2017	Royal Television Society Awards	Comedy Performance	Sharon Horgan and Rob Delaney	Nominated	
2018	BAFTA TV Awards	Best Female Comedy Performance	Sharon Horgan	Nominated	
2018	BAFTA TV Awards	Best Scripted Comedy	Catastrophe	Nominated	
2018	BAFTA TV Craft Awards	Best Writer: Comedy	Rob Delaney and Sharon Horgan	Nominated	
