= Rachel Williams (model) =

American model, television presenter

- Born: April 29, 1967 (age 59); New York City, New York, U.S.
- Modeling information
- Height: 1.83 m (6 ft 0 in)
- Hair color: Blonde
- Eye color: Blue

Rachel Williams (born April 29, 1967) is an American model, TV presenter, and landscape designer.

== Early life ==
Williams is the daughter of architect Tod Williams and Patricia Agnes Jones, a dancer. Her parents divorced when she was five years old, and she and her younger brother, filmmaker Tod "Kip" Williams, lived with their mother in the West Village in Lower Manhattan. After her mother's remarriage in the late 1970s, they moved to Woodstock, New York. After graduating from high school, Williams enrolled at Mills College. After a year, she transferred to Bard College where she majored in art history.

== Career ==
In November 1985, Williams was discovered by a Click Model Management employee while visiting her father's studio. On the advice of the employee, Williams met with Click's owner Frances Grill. Grill deemed Williams too heavy to model but signed her to a conditional, one-year contract after Williams promised to lose weight. Williams returned to school and, over the course of a year, lost twenty pounds. She returned to Click in October 1986, and renewed her contract.

Williams' career started off slow but she got her break in January 1987. After another model became sick and was unable to make a swimsuit shoot for Mademoiselle, Williams was assigned to the job on the recommendation of Grill. Williams' pictures from the shoot drew the interest of photographers. Her next job was a photoshoot in Barbados for Arthur Elgort. Upon her return, she worked with Bill King for French Elle.

Williams' popularity grew. In February 1987, she booked jobs for the British and Italian editions of Vogue and a sitting for Bloomingdales. The following month, she was photographed by Bruce Weber for Calvin Klein. Williams later appeared in Cosmo, and did catalog work for Victoria's Secret and J. Crew. She also appeared in advertising campaigns for Bon Jour jeans, Ciara perfume, Absolut vodka, and Revlon.

Dissatisfied with the quality of her modeling jobs, Williams left Click after two years and signed with the Ford Agency. Click filed an $11 million breach of contract lawsuit against Williams. Click also filed a lawsuit against the Ford Agency and model Christy Turlington who was signed with Ford. Click claimed that Turlington and Ford's vice president Eileen Ford persuaded Williams to break her contract with Click to sign with Ford. In April 1990, a judge ruled in Turlington's favor.

At the height of her modeling career, Williams left to study architecture at Columbia University. After graduation, she returned to modeling. In 1992, she posed for Playboy. In 1995, she appeared in an ad campaign photographed by Richard Avedon and walked the runway for Thierry Mugler's Winter haute couture show, and was the cover model for the Red Krayola's EP Amor and Language. From 1996 to 1997, she co-hosted the Channel 4 series The Girlie Show. In 1996 she was also featured in videos for George Michael's "Fastlove" and Simply Red's "Never Never Love". In 2000, Williams guest starred as "Dr. Rachel Williams, Supermodel", in an episode of Strangers with Candy. In February 2009, Williams opened Giles Deacon's Fall/Winter fashion show during London Fashion Week.

== Personal life ==
While attending college, Williams dated restaurateur Eric Goode.

In March 1995, Williams' manager publicly announced her relationship with British pop singer Alice Temple:

"The simplicity of the story is what makes it really beautiful. Here are two people who respect each other and have an attraction based on their life and their lifestyle. They have a lot of time to be with each other (sharing a flat in London). They've created a life together. Rachel has no problem with the fact that she's with Alice. 'I never thought to hide it,' the megamodel known as The Amazon shrugged in coming out of the fashion closet to shocked headlines. 'I've had flings with women before, though my long-term relationships have always been with men. I was pleasantly surprised when I fell for Alice!'"
