= Rachel Shenton =

English actress (born 1987)

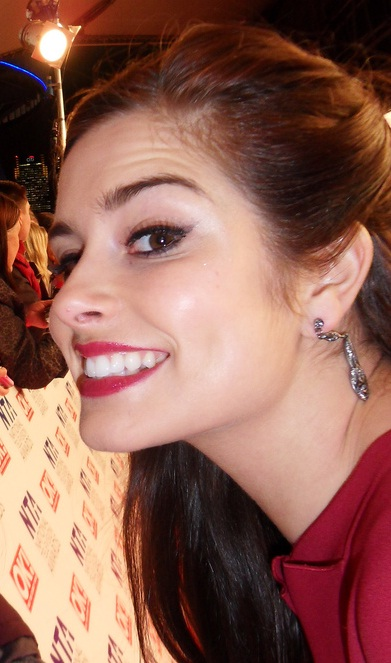
- Shenton in 2009
- Born: Rachel Joy Shenton; 21 December 1987 (age 38); Stoke-on-Trent, Staffordshire, England
- Occupation: Actress
- Years active: 2004–present
- Known for: Hollyoaks; All Creatures Great and Small; The Silent Child
- Spouse: Chris Overton (m. 2018)
- Children: 1
- Awards: Academy Award for Best Live Action Short Film at the 90th Academy Awards for The Silent Child

Rachel Joy Shenton (born 21 December 1987) is an English actress and writer. She gained prominence for her role as Courtney in Waterloo Road and has starred in the ABC Family drama Switched at Birth (2014–2017), the BBC2 sitcom White Gold (2019), and the Channel 5 series All Creatures Great and Small (2020–).

In 2018, Shenton won an Academy Award for her short film The Silent Child, which she wrote, produced and starred in. She is fluent in British Sign Language and American Sign Language.

== Early life and education ==
Shenton attended two secondary schools, one in Cheadle. Shenton went on to study performing arts at Stoke-on-Trent College (Burslem Campus). In between studying and acting roles, she volunteered at her local charity, Deaflinks.

== Career ==
=== Early career ===
Shenton started her career at Edinburgh fringe festival, where her play received critical acclaim. Shenton's acting career began with small recurring parts in various television series such as Holby City and Waterloo Road. She also filmed various television commercials for the Ministry of Defence, DFS and Sega Superstars Tennis and appeared in two British films. She continued recurring appearances in 2008 appearing in Nickelodeon's series Genie in the House and Five's Sophia's Diary, playing Sofia's wayward sister 'Trisha'.

=== Hollyoaks ===
In April 2010, it was announced that Shenton had been cast in Hollyoaks as Mitzeee Minniver, an aspiring glamour model. Shenton described her character as being the complete opposite of her. Her casting came as part of new producer Paul Marquess' major revamp of the serial. Before her character had appeared on-screen Shenton received media attention for her image, with tabloids reporting on her likeness to Cheryl Cole. Shenton described the attention and comparisons as "very flattering". On 20 December 2012, Shenton announced her decision to leave Hollyoaks. Shenton's final scenes as Mitzeee aired on 15 February 2013, when the character moved to the United States.

=== Further roles and The Silent Child ===
On 28 April 2014, it was announced that Shenton would make her American television debut in season 3 of the ABC Family drama Switched at Birth playing young student teacher Lilly Summers. Shenton went on to shoot season 4 and 5 which was when the show ended. The final season aired in February 2017.

In August 2017, Shenton appeared in The Silent Child, a film which she created and co-produced with her husband Chris Overton. The film was based on Shenton's own experiences as the child of a parent who became deaf. The film features profoundly deaf six-year-old first-time actor Maisie Sly as the titular child. British Sign Language (BSL) is used in the film.

The film won best short film at the Rhode Island International Film Festival in August 2017. That made it eligible for the Oscars. In December 2017, the film was selected as one of the final ten films in the Live Action Short Film category for the 90th Academy Awards. On 23 January 2018, it was announced that The Silent Child had been nominated for the Academy Award for Best Live Action Short Film for the 90th Academy Awards, which it won. Shenton kept a promise she had made to the young lead actress and signed her acceptance speech.

In March 2019, Shenton joined the cast of the BBC2 comedy series White Gold, playing Jo Scott, a motivational speaker turned window saleswoman, alongside James Buckley and Joe Thomas.

In September 2020, she began appearing as Helen Alderson in the Channel 5 and PBS adaptation of All Creatures Great and Small. Significant changes were made from the source material (both the previous television series and the memoir), allowing the role of Helen to be greatly expanded. The programme has been renewed for five series as of 2025.

In June 2023, she played Emily in For Her Sins, a TV drama broadcast on Channel 5. Also in 2023, she starred in the short film In Too Deep, directed by her husband Chris Overton.

Shenton is due to star in the upcoming six-part scripted podcast series that she has written called 'Gladstone Girls.' The series tells the story of a group of female workers in the Stoke-on-Trent potteries. They fight to keep their factory traditions alive after a new boss comes along and tries to change things.

== Midlands Screen Acting School ==
The Midlands Screen Acting School
- Official logo for The Midlands Screen Acting School since 2022
- Formerly: Acting Mechanics
- Industry: Acting, Film and Entertainment
- Founded: 2013 (as Acting Mechanics); 2022 (rebranded to The Midlands Screen Acting School)
- Founder: Rachel Shenton; Amanda Andrews
- Headquarters: The Catalyst Building, Staffordshire University
- Services: Education and training in acting for screen
- Website: https://midlandsscreenactingschool.com/

In 2013, Shenton founded the Midlands Screen Acting School (abbreviated to MSAS and initially named Acting Mechanics) alongside her first acting teacher and agent Amanda Andrews. The school specialises in delivering lessons focused on technique for screen acting, as Shenton had always thought accessible education in this field has always been lacking when compared to its stage-based counterpart. Acting Mechanics was rebranded to The Midlands Screen Acting School in 2022.

Shenton wanted to create opportunities for actors entering the industry in her home town of Stoke-on-Trent.

Classes are designed for up-and-coming actors who are looking to take the next step in their career, however, they do cater to a range of abilities.

The school holds classes once a month at The Catalyst Building within Staffordshire University. There is also an online offering available.

The monthly classes come in a variety of different forms including a six-month long course for juniors and adults, a 12-month long course for juniors and adults as well as drop-in sessions. Online "career surgery" sessions are also offered to give people a chance to focus more on career development and achieving their own goals rather than the technique of acting as is taught in the other classes.

On top of these regular offerings, a selection of one off classes and one-day courses are offered allowing for a deeper dive into specific techniques. These are often led by external industry professionals.

=== Industry links ===
MSAS are a Spotlight accredited school which means, upon completion of two six-month courses or the twelve-month course, students aged eighteen and over are eligible for a full membership with Spotlight, the most-used professional casting database in the UK acting industry.

The schools sister company, MSAS Management, offers full agency representation to all students who have not secured this independently. This allows them to secure auditions for major projects.

Notable former industry guests have included BAFTA-Winning director of The BBC's Ralph and Katie Jordan Hogg, All Creatures Great and Small star Nicholas Ralph, and Adrian Rawlins, known for his portrayal of James Potter in the Harry Potter films.

== Personal life ==
When Shenton was 12, her father became deaf after undergoing chemotherapy treatment for cancer. Following the death of her father, Shenton learned British Sign Language. In 2011, Shenton was made ambassador for the National Deaf Children's Society and she continues to raise awareness of deafness in the UK.

In March 2011, Shenton completed a skydive in aid of National Deaf Children's Society. In May 2011, Shenton helped to launch a social networking website for deaf people named "Viewtalk". In February 2012, Shenton announced that she was due to climb Mount Kilimanjaro in aid of the charity. In October 2012, she climbed the BT Tower in aid of Action on Hearing Loss.

Shenton married British actor and filmmaker Chris Overton in summer 2018. The couple were engaged in March 2018 when she and Overton accepted the Oscar for best short film, live action. She gave birth to their first child, a boy, in April 2025.

In July 2019, Shenton was commended with an honorary degree from Keele University for her "outstanding contribution in raising awareness for educational support for disabilities in children, as an inspirational role model for young people, and for her commitment to equality and diversity".

In November 2023, Shenton was awarded an Honorary Doctorate of Arts at Staffordshire University for her work as an actress as well as helping aspiring actors through The Midlands Screen Acting School and her work campaigning for the deaf community.

== Filmography ==
=== Film ===
Year	Title	Role	Notes
2004	Kiss & Tell	Claire	Short films
2005	Agnosia	Tania	Short films
2005	Xlitherman	Shade Girl	
2009	Money Kills	Anya Valeskavich	
2012	Blood and Bone China	Anna Fitzgerald	
2012	The Feeling of Unreality	Maria Moon	Short films
2013	The Winter's Club	Agent Shaw	Short films
2016	The Hand of the Creator	Amy Nun	
2017	The Silent Child	Joanne	Short film; also writer and producer
2019	A Glimpse	Jess	Short films
2021	Angels in the Asylum	Nurse Hettie	Short films
2021	Roy	Cara	Short film; also associate producer
2021	The Colour Room	Annie Shorter	
2023	In Too Deep	Carol	Short film; also producer
2023	Ozi: Voice of the Forest	Kirani Hands (voice)	
2024	The Strangers – Chapter 1	Debbie Lucas	
2025	Familiar Stranger	Ava	Short film
2025	The Strangers – Chapter 2	Debbie Lucas	
2026	The Strangers – Chapter 3	Debbie Lucas	

=== Television ===
Year	Title	Role	Notes
2005	Holby City	Katrina Hobsbawn	1 episode: "Doing the Right Thing" (7.52)
2006	Doctors	Sadie Slade	1 episode: "Positively Blooming" (7.115)
2007	Waterloo Road	Courtney	3 episodes (series 2)
2007	Doctors	Jade Hearn/Robertson	1 episode: "Careers Day" (9.111)
2008	Storyville	English storyteller	Ident
2008	Sophia's Dairy	Tricia	1 episode
2008	Genie in the House	Amy	1 episode: "Curse of the Genie Ring" (3.09)
2010–2013	Hollyoaks	Mitzeee Minniver	Regular cast member (235 episodes); 23 July 2010 – 15 February 2013
2010–2012	Hollyoaks Later	Mitzeee Minniver	15 episodes
2011	Blood and Bone China	Anna Fitzgerald	10 episodes
2013	Living the Dream	Rachel	Television film
2014–2017	Switched at Birth	Lily Summers (Kennish)	19 episodes (series 3–5)
2015	Year of Spies	Eve Harper	2 episodes: "March" and "October"
2019	White Gold	Joanne Scott	6 episodes (series 2)
2019	A Confession	Emma	Mini-series; 1 episode
2019	A Very British Christmas	Jessica Bailey	Television film
2020–present	All Creatures Great & Small	Helen Alderson/Herriot	47 episodes (series 1–7)
2023	For Her Sins	Emily Furness	4 episodes
2025	The Rumour	Joanna	Main role; 5 episodes

=== Voice over ===
Year	Title	Role	Notes
2005	NSPCC Eye Opener	Abused teenager	Voice over
2006	Bulldog Broadband	Presenter	Voice over
2009	Selston Cosmetic Clinic	Presenter	Voice over

== Awards and nominations ==
Year	Award	Category	Work	Result
2011	British Soap Awards	Sexiest Female	Hollyoaks	Nominated
2011	All About Soap Bubble Awards	Best Newcomer	Hollyoaks	Nominated
2011	TV Choice Awards	Best Soap Newcomer	Hollyoaks	Nominated
2011	Inside Soap Awards	Best Newcomer	Hollyoaks	Nominated
2012	Inside Soap Awards	Sexiest Female	Hollyoaks	Nominated
2012	National Television Awards	Serial Drama Performance	Hollyoaks	Nominated
2017	London Independent Film Festival	Best Actress	The Silent Child	Won
2017	Overcome Film Festival	Best Actress	The Silent Child	Won
2017	Academy Awards	Best Live Action Short Film	The Silent Child	Won
2019	New Renaissance Film Festival	Best Actress	A Glimpse	Won
2020	Bristol Independent Film Festival	Best Actress	A Glimpse	Won
