= Angels in the Asylum =

British drama film

- Directed by: Rob Sorrenti
- Written by: Rob Sorrenti
- Produced by: Heather Greenwood; Rob Sorrenti
- Starring: Katherine Waterston; Simon Pegg; Minnie Driver; Rose Williams
- Cinematography: James Friend
- Production company: AITA Films Limited
- Distributed by: Parkland Pictures
- Country: United Kingdom
- Language: English

Angels in the Asylum is a suspended British film written and directed by Rob Sorrenti in his feature directorial debut. The film stars Katherine Waterston, Simon Pegg, Minnie Driver, Aurora Perrineau, Rose Williams and Lesley Nicol.

The future of the film was put in uncertainty after being halted in February 2025 due to lack of funds.

== Premise ==
The film is inspired by a BBC Newsnight exposé on the women who were incarcerated in 1907 at Long Grove Asylum in Surrey, a former hospital for the mentally ill, because they were typhoid carriers.

== Cast ==
- Katherine Waterston
- Simon Pegg
- Minnie Driver
- Cush Jumbo
- Rose Williams
- Miriam Margolyes
- Aurora Perrineau
- Kai Alexander

== Production ==
Writer and director Rob Sorrenti had developed the project since 2008, prior to Heather Greenwood and James Friend joining as producer and cinematographer, respectively. The cast includes Simon Pegg, Minnie Driver, Rose Williams, Aurora Perrineau, Kai Alexander and Katherine Waterston. Principal photography began in Kent in January 2025. Filming was scheduled for Louth, Lincolnshire in February 2025. After 15 days of filming, production was halted indefinitely due to lack of funding; it was originally set to last for a month.

In April 2025, production company AITA Films Limited filed for bankruptcy after exhausting their funds, owing 150 crew members at least £600,000 in wages. Greenwood and Sorrenti claimed that distributor Parkland Pictures had failed to provide funding, while Parkland said that it had "no agreement to finance Angels in the Asylum beyond its work as a sales agent". By December 2025, the producers were in talks with financial investors for further funding, to potentially restart the film's production. By March 2026, after talks with financial investors failed, the UK government's Redundancy Payments Service stepped in to pay some of the £600,000 owed to the crew.
