= The Girlie Show (British TV programme) =

British TV series (1996–1997)

- Presented by: Sarah Cawood; Claire Gorham; Rachel Williams; Sara Cox
- Country of origin: United Kingdom
- Original language: English
- No. of series: 2
- No. of episodes: 12

Production
- Running time: 60 mins

Original release
- Network: Channel 4
- Release: 26 January 1996 – 28 February 1997

The Girlie Show is a British television programme that aired on Channel 4 from 26 January 1996 to 28 February 1997. Its presenters were Sarah Cawood, Claire Gorham, American model Rachel Williams and, in her first presenting job, Sara Cox. The programme ran for two series in 1996 and 1997.

== Format ==
Its magazine format allowed for interviews, live music, features, and stunts involving studio guests and the live audience.

Originally broadcast in the old The Word time slot of 11 pm on a Friday night, The Girlie Show later occupied Channel 4's traditional 'post-pub' time slot. As with The Word, the late-night scheduling meant guests and presenters encouraged each other to be controversial. In the tradition of The Word, the show's content and its presenters were heavily hyped as being more edgy, dangerous and 'ballsy' than other programmes on British television.

The show also featured a group of four "Twentysomething" males from Sunderland in the north-east of England called "The Naked Apes" (named after the book by Desmond Morris of the same name). The four were filmed each week in a variety of situations including a trip to Amsterdam, trying to pick up women in a gay nightclub, and going to the greyhound races dressed up as the "Reservoir Dogs". This was an early format for what would later become "reality TV", and showed what "lads" got up to when they hung out together. The group gained notoriety due to continued scenes of drinking and their attitudes towards life and women.

Another regular feature of the show was 'Wanker of the Week', criticizing a celebrity who had done or said something during that particular week that made them worthy of the title. Recipients included Naomi Campbell and Jimmy Nail.

The series was notable for being the first to feature the girl group Spice Girls.

There was considerable tabloid backlash against the show due to its often amateurish production standards - the presenters had little experience of live television. It was similarly castigated in the broadsheets as 'witless'. Although the intention of the producers was to cash in on the Girl Power and ladette phenomena, feminist commentators complained that the show's style and content appealed to male chauvinistic stereotypes. Several so-called practical jokes on members of the audience were also clearly staged. Channel 4 subsequently placed the show at number 80 in its 100 Greatest TV Moments from Hell list.
