= Chris Overton =

English actor

- Born: England
- Occupations: Actor, filmmaker
- Years active: 2000–present
- Spouse: Rachel Shenton (m. 2018)
- Children: 1

Chris Overton is an English actor and filmmaker. He is known for his role as Liam McAllister in the soap opera Hollyoaks, and for directing and co-producing the short film The Silent Child, which garnered him an Academy Award.

== Early life and education ==
Chris Overton was born and grew up in Cannock, Staffordshire.

== Career ==
In 2010 Overton played Liam McAllister, a former footballer who became a cage fighter, in Hollyoaks.

In 2017 he directed a short film called The Silent Child, about a profoundly deaf four-year-old girl who is taught British sign language by a social worker, played by Rachel Shenton (who was also in Hollyoaks). The film won the Academy Award for Best Live Action Short Film.

His second short film as a director, Leader, was about climate change, and made using a smartphone. It had its world premiere at the SmartFone Flick Fest in Sydney, Australia.

== Personal life ==
Overton married Rachel Shenton, who had co-produced and starred in The Silent Child, in a private wedding in 2018, after being in a relationship since around 2010. They have a son born in April 2025.

== Filmography ==
=== Actor ===
Year	Title	Role	Notes
2003	The Big Read	Will Parry	
2003	Harry Potter and the Philosopher's Stone		Video game; voices only
2004	The Brief	Ryan Eltham	
2004	The Phantom of the Opera	Young Phantom	Feature film
2004	Doctors	Alex Cummings	TV series
2005	Oliver Twist	Noah Claypole	Feature film
2005	The Mysti Show	Jack	
2009	Doctors	Nick Fenwright	TV series
2010	A Touch of Frost	Sean Berland	TV series
2010	Hollyoaks Later	Liam McAllister	TV series
2010	Hollyoaks	Liam	TV series
2011	Two Pints of Lager and a Packet of Crisps	Graham	
2012	Casualty	James Bowman	TV series
2012	DCI Banks	Tyler Judd	TV series
2013	Dalston Heath	Finn	Short film
2013	WPC 56	PC Eddie Coulson	
2013	Prisoner's Wives	Blake Fenner	
2014	Pride	Reggie Blennerhassett	Feature film
2015	Drifters	Maggot	TV series. Series 3 episode 5: "Plus One"
2019	A Glimpse	Alex	Short film

=== Director ===
Year	Title	Notes
2017	The Silent Child	Short film
2022	Leader	Short film made on a smartphone
