= The Silent Child =

2017 British film

- Film poster
- Directed by: Chris Overton
- Written by: Rachel Shenton
- Produced by: Rachel Shenton; Chris Overton; Rebecca Harris; Julie Foy
- Starring: Rachel Shenton; Maisie Sly; Rachel Fielding; Philip York
- Cinematography: Ali Farahani
- Edited by: Emily Walder
- Music by: Amir Konjani
- Production company: Slick Films
- Release date: 8 August 2017 (United States)
- Running time: 20 minutes
- Country: United Kingdom
- Languages: English and British Sign Language

The Silent Child is a British sign language short film written by and starring Rachel Shenton and directed by Chris Overton, and released in 2017 by Slick Films. It tells the story of Libby, a profoundly deaf six-year-old girl, who lives a silent life until a social worker, played by Shenton, teaches her how to communicate through sign language. The film won the Oscar for Live Action Short Film at the 90th Academy Awards. The film's television debut was on BBC One to an audience of 3.6 million, the film then received an extended period on BBC iPlayer.

== Premise ==
The film was based on Shenton's own experiences as the child of a parent who became deaf. The film features profoundly deaf six-year-old first-time actor Maisie Sly as the titular child. British Sign Language (BSL) is used in the film.

== Plot ==
Joanne (Rachel Shenton) is a social worker who arrives at Libby's (Maisie Sly) home as Libby's siblings (Sam Rees and Annie Cusselle) and father Paul (Philip York) run out the door. Libby's mother, Sue, (Rachel Fielding) explains that Libby was found deaf at three years old despite having no deaf relatives, and that she can lip-read. However, the truth is no one makes any effort to communicate with her: though they assume Libby is able to read their lips proficiently, they change topics quickly, speak without facing her, and leave her isolated for long periods of time. Libby's most strained relationship is with her mother, who claims she is too busy for such basic activities as taking her to the park, and whose physical affection Libby rejects.

Taken aback at Libby's lack of familial interaction, and wishing to help the child diversify her forms of communication, Joanne teaches Libby British Sign Language. They take trips to the park and garden, play sardines and eat sweets, all in BSL. Libby, who quickly gains a proficiency of BSL, soon adores Joanne, with whom she can communicate. However, Libby is still unable to communicate at home; though her siblings show appreciation for Joanne's work and Libby's knowledge of BSL, even showing interest in learning the language, Libby's parents flatly refuse to learn, with the excuse that there is no time for the family to participate due to their schedules. Furthermore, Sue shows increasing signs of insecurity at Joanne's close relationship with Libby, and is opposed to Libby learning BSL, believing that Libby's best chance of classroom integration is to continue lip-reading in opposition to Joanne's insistence that her best odds are with a classroom aide and interpreter (a role Joanne volunteers for).

While talking to Paul's mother (Anna Barry), Joanne realizes that Libby was the product of an extramarital affair, and her biological father’s father was deaf, contrary to what Sue had said in their first meeting. The family has low expectations for Libby, despite her being intelligent and active; Paul's mother shows outdated knowledge of deafness and is unsure if Libby will even be able to get a job.

Soon, Sue and Paul fire Joanne, telling her that Libby cannot continue BSL and must return to lip-reading. Despite Joanne's suggestions they are sending her to a normal school, where another deaf boy had been and "did fine". On Libby's first day at school, she cannot understand anything. She stands all day, alone, while the teacher talks as if Libby could hear, and the children play around her. Joanne, upset at being unable to say goodbye to Libby, arrives at her school to find her standing alone at playtime. When the little girl spots her, she signs "I love you". Joanne, realizing Libby's future (alone, with no communication and no support), begins to cry before signing "I love you" back, and leaves. The film ends with a PSA that deaf children can succeed in every way a hearing child can, as long as they have the proper support.

== Cast ==
- Rachel Shenton as Joanne, a social worker
- Maisie Sly as Libby, a profoundly deaf four-year-old girl
- Rachel Fielding as Sue
- Philip York as Paul
- Anna Barry as Nancy
- Sam Rees as Seb
- Annie Cusselle as Pip

== Reception ==
=== Critical response ===
The Silent Child has an approval rating of 92% on review aggregator website Rotten Tomatoes, based on 13 reviews, and an average rating of 8.71/10.

=== Accolades ===
The Silent Child won best short film at the Rhode Island International Film Festival in August 2017. This made it eligible for entry to the Oscars. In December 2017 the film was selected as one of the final ten films in the Live Action Short Film category for the 90th Academy Awards. On 23 January 2018, it was announced that The Silent Child was nominated for the Academy Award for Best Live Action Short Film for the 90th Academy Awards, which it then won. Shenton kept a promise that she had made to their young lead actress and signed her acceptance speech.

Award	Date of ceremony	Category	Recipients	Result
Academy Awards	March 4, 2018	Live Action Short Film	Chris Overton and Rachel Shenton	Won
Aesthetica Short Film Festival	November 12, 2017	People's Choice Award	Chris Overton	Won
Aesthetica Short Film Festival	November 12, 2017	Youth Jury Award	Chris Overton	Won
Hollywood International Moving Pictures Film Festival	August, 2017	Award of Recognition: Short Drama	Chris Overton	Won
Hollywood International Moving Pictures Film Festival	August, 2017	Award of Recognition: Actress Under 18	Maisie Sly	Won
London Independent Film Awards	August, 2017	Best Actress	Rachel Shenton	Won
Rhode Island International Film Festival	August 13, 2017	Best Actress	Maisie Sly	Won
Rhode Island International Film Festival	August 13, 2017	Grand Jury Prize Winner	Chris Overton	Won
Encounters International Film Festival	2017	Audience Choice Award	Chris Overton and Rachel Shenton	Won
American Short Film Awards	2017	Best Short Film of the Year	Chris Overton and Rachel Shenton	Won
Gold Movie Awards	2017	Film of the Year	Chris Overton and Rachel Shenton	Won
Gold Movie Awards	2017	Film of the Month	Chris Overton and Rachel Shenton	Won
Gold Movie Awards	2017	Best Short Film	Chris Overton and Rachel Shenton	Won
Lift-Off Film Festival, Season Awards	2017	Best Acting Ensemble	The entire cast.	Won
New Renaissance Film Festival	2017	Humanity Award	Chris Overton and Rachel Shenton	Won
New Renaissance Film Festival	2017	Best Cinematography	Ali Farahani	Won
New Renaissance Film Festival	2017	Best Director	Chris Overton	Nominated
New Renaissance Film Festival	2017	Best Actress	Rachel Shenton	Nominated
Sydney Indie Film Festival	2017	Best Film	Chris Overton and Rachel Shenton	Won
Sydney Indie Film Festival	2017	Best Cinematography	Ali Farahani	Nominated
Sydney Indie Film Festival	2017	Best Actress	Rachel Shenton	Nominated
Southampton International Film Festival	2017	Best Short Screenplay	Rachel Shenton	Won
Southampton International Film Festival	2017	Best Short Film	Chris Overton and Rachel Shenton	Nominated
Southampton International Film Festival	2017	Best Actress	Rachel Shenton	Nominated
Southampton International Film Festival	2017	Best Supporting Actress	Maisy Sly	Nominated
Overcome Film Festival	2017	Best Actress	Rachel Shenton	Won
Overcome Film Festival	2017	Best International Short Film	Chris Overton and Rachel Shenton	Won
Riverbend Film Festival	2018	Best Actress	Rachel Shenton	Won
Riverbend Film Festival	2018	Best Director	Chris Overton	Won
Savannah Film Festival	2017	Best Narrative Short	Chris Overton and Rachel Shenton	Won
The Short Film Awards	2017	Best Narrative Short Film	Chris Overton and Rachel Shenton	Won
The Short Film Awards	2017	Best Editing	Emily Walder	Won
London Independent Film Festival	2017	Grand Jury Prize	Chris Overton and Rachel Shenton	Won

== Festivals selections ==
Film Festival	Notes
Rhode Island International Film Festival	Official Selection
Aesthetica Short Film Festival	Official Selection
Encounters International Film Festival	Official Selection
Savannah Film Festival	Official Selection
Foyle International Film Festival	Official Selection
Heartland International Film Festival	Official Selection
London Short Film Festival	Official Selection
London Independent Film Festival	Official Selection
HollyShorts International Film Festival	Official Selection
Sydney Indie Film Festival	Official Selection
Kerry Short Film Festival	Official Selection
Underwire International Film Festival	Official Selection
New Renaissance International Film Festival	Official Selection
Bolton International Film Festival	Official Selection
London Lift-Off Film Festival	Official Selection
Hollywood International Moving Picture Film Festival	Official Selection
Southampton International Film Festival	Official Selection
Overcome Film Festival	Official Selection
Riverbend Film Festival	Official Selection
Gold Movie Awards	Official Selection
The Short Film Awards	Official Selection
American Short Film Awards	Official Selection

== See also ==
- List of films featuring the deaf and hard of hearing
