= List of fantasy films of the 2000s =

A list of fantasy films released in the 2000s.

== List ==
Title	Director	Cast	Country	Notes
2000
The 10th Kingdom	David Carson, Herbert Wise	Kimberly Williams-Paisley, Scott Cohen, Daniel Lapaine	United States	
Bedazzled	Harold Ramis	Brendan Fraser, Elizabeth Hurley, Frances O'Connor	United States	
El Corazon del guerrero	Daniel Monzon	Fernando Ramallo, Neus Asensi, Joel Joan	Spain	
Disney's The Kid	Jon Turteltaub	Bruce Willis, Spencer Breslin, Emily Mortimer	United States	
Dragonheart: A New Beginning	Doug Lefler	Robby Benson, Christopher Masterson, Harry Van Gorkum	United States	
Dungeons & Dragons	Courtney Solomon	Justin Whalin, Marlon Wayans, Thora Birch	United States	
The Emperor's New Groove	Mark Dindal	David Spade John Goodman Eartha Kitt Patrick Warburton	United States	
Escaflowne	Kazuki Akane		Japan	
The Family Man	Brett Ratner	Nicolas Cage, Téa Leoni, Don Cheadle	United States	
Faust: Love of the Damned	Brian Yuzna	Mark Frost, Isabel Brook, Jennifer Rope	Spain	Dark fantasy
Gojoe: Spirit War Chronicle	Sogo Ishii	Tadanobu Asano, Masatoshi Nagase, Daisuke Ryu	Japan	Fantasy adventure
How the Grinch Stole Christmas	Ron Howard	Jim Carrey, Jeffrey Tambor, Christine Baranski	United States	
Il Mare	Lee Hyun-seung	Lee Jung-jae, Jun Ji-hyun	South Korea	
Left Behind: The Movie	Vic Sarin	Brad Johnson, Kirk Cameron, Clarence Gilyard Jr.	United States	
The Legend of Bagger Vance	Robert Redford	Will Smith, Matt Damon, Charlize Theron	United States	
Life-Size	Mark Rosman	Tyra Banks, Lindsay Lohan, Jere Burns	United States	
Princes et princesses	Michel Ocelot		France	
The Road to El Dorado	Don Paul, Eric "Bibo" Bergeron	Kenneth Branagh, Kevin Kline, Rosie Perez	United States	Animated film
What Women Want	Nancy Meyers	Mel Gibson, Helen Hunt, Marisa Tomei	United States	Fantasy comedy
2001
Belphegor, Phantom of the Louvre	Jean-Paul Salomé		France	
Black Knight	Gil Junger	Martin Lawrence, Tom Wilkinson, Marsha Thomason	United States	
Claire	Milford Thomas	Toniet Gallego, Mish P. DeLight, James Ferguson	United States	
Donnie Darko	Richard Kelly	Jake Gyllenhaal, Jena Malone, Mary McDonnell	United States	
Dr. Dolittle 2	Steve Carr		United States	Fantasy-comedy
Down to Earth	Chris Weitz, Paul Weitz	Chris Rock, Eugene Levy, Chazz Palminteri	United States	Heaven-can-wait fantasy
Harry Potter and the Philosopher's Stone	Chris Columbus	Daniel Radcliffe, Rupert Grint, Emma Watson	United Kingdom; United States	
Human Nature	Michel Gondry	Tim Robbins, Patricia Arquette, Rhys Ifans	France; United States	Fantasy-comedy
Jack and the Beanstalk: The Real Story	Brian Henson	Matthew Modine, Vanessa Redgrave, Mia Sara	United States	
Kate & Leopold	James Mangold	Meg Ryan, Hugh Jackman, Liev Schreiber	United States	
The Legend of Zu	Tsui Hark	Zhang Ziyi, Cecilia Cheung, Kelly Lin	Hong Kong; China	
Lenya	Michael Rowitz	Anja Knauer, Sonja Kirchberger	Germany	Fantasy adventure
The Lord of the Rings: The Fellowship of the Ring	Peter Jackson	Elijah Wood, Ian McKellen, Ian Holm, Viggo Mortensen	United States; New Zealand	
The Luck of the Irish		Ryan Merriman, Alexis Lopez, Glenndon Chatman	United States	Fantasy-comedy
The Lost Empire	Peter MacDonald	Thomas Gibson, Bai Ling, Russell Wong	United States	
Monkeybone	Henry Selick	Brendan Fraser, Bridget Fonda, Whoopi Goldberg	United States	Fantasy comedy
Monsters, Inc.	Peter Docter, Lee Unkrich, David Silverman	John Goodman Billy Crystal Steve Buscemi	United States	
The Mummy Returns	Stephen Sommers	Brendan Fraser, Rachel Weisz, Arnold Vosloo	United States	Fantasy adventure
No Such Thing	Hal Hartley	Sarah Polley, Robert Burke, Helen Mirren	United States; Iceland	
Onmyoji	Yōjirō Takita	Mansai Nomura, Hideaki Itō, Hiroyuki Sanada	Japan	
Princess Arete	Sinao Katabuchi		Japan	
Shallow Hal	Farrelly brothers	Gwyneth Paltrow, Jack Black, Jason Alexander	United States	Fantasy-comedy
Shrek	Andrew Adamson, Vicky Jenson	Mike Myers, Eddie Murphy Cameron Diaz John Lithgow	United States	Parody fantasy-comedy
Spirited Away	Hayao Miyazaki		Japan	
Undercover Kitty	Vincent Bal	Carice van Houten, Theo Maassen, Sarah Bannier	Netherlands	
2002
Bear's Kiss	Sergei Bodrov	Rebecca Liljeberg, Joachim Krol, Sergei Bodrov Jr.	France; Germany; Italy; Russia; Spain; Sweden	
Bloody Mallory	Julien Magnat	Olivia Bonamy, Adria Collado, Jeffrey Ribie	France	
The Cat Returns	Hiroyuki Morita		Japan	
Dinotopia	Marco Brambilla	Tyron Leitso, David Thewlis, Wentworth Miller	United States	
Dracula, Pages From a Virgin's Diary	Guy Maddin	Zhang Wei-Qiang, Tara Birtwhistle, David Moroni	Canada	Musical fantasy
Hansel and Gretel	Gary J. Tunnicliffe	Taylor Momsen, Jacob Smith, Delta Burke	United States	
Harry Potter and the Chamber of Secrets	Chris Columbus	Daniel Radcliffe, Rupert Grint, Emma Watson	United Kingdom; United States	Fantasy/coming-of-age/drama
The Hot Chick	Tom Brady	Rob Schneider, Anna Faris, Matthew Lawrence	United States	
Left Behind II: Tribulation Force	Bill Corcoran	Kirk Cameron, Brad Johnson, Clarence Gilyard Jr.	United States	
Like Mike	John Schultz	Lil' Bow Wow, Morris Chestnut, Jonathan Lipnicki	United States	Fantasy comedy
The Lord of the Rings: The Two Towers	Peter Jackson	Elijah Wood, Ian McKellen, Liv Tyler	New Zealand; United States	
Pinocchio	Roberto Benigni	Roberto Benigni, Nicoletta Braschi, Kim Rossi Stuart	Italy	
Reign of Fire	Rob Bowman	Christian Bale, Matthew McConaughey, Izabella Scorupco	United States	
Return to Never Land	Robin Budd, Donovan Cook		United States	
The Santa Clause 2	Michael Lembeck	Tim Allen, Elizabeth Mitchell, David Krumholtz	United States	
The Scorpion King	Chuck Russell	The Rock, Steven Brand, Michael Clarke Duncan	United States	
Snow Queen	David Wu	Bridget Fonda, Jeremy Guilbaut, Chelsea Hobbs	United States	
A Tree of Palme			Japan	Fantasy adventure
Tuck Everlasting	Jay W. Russell	Alexis Bledel, William Hurt, Sissy Spacek	United States	
Baba	Suresh Krishna	Rajinikanth, Manisha Koirala	India	
2003
Angels in America	Mike Nichols	Al Pacino, Meryl Streep, Emma Thompson	United States	
Big Fish	Tim Burton	Ewan McGregor, Albert Finney, Billy Crudup	United States	Fantasy-comedy
Bruce Almighty	Tom Shadyac	Jim Carrey, Jennifer Aniston, Morgan Freeman	United States	
Dr. Seuss' The Cat in the Hat	Bo Welch	Mike Myers, Alec Baldwin, Kelly Preston	{United States	Children's fantasy
Elf	Jon Favreau	Will Ferrell, Ed Asner, James Caan	United States	Fantasy comedy
Freaky Friday	Mark Waters	Jamie Lee Curtis, Lindsay Lohan, Mark Harmon	United States	Fantasy comedy
The Haunted Mansion	Rob Minkoff	Eddie Murphy, Terence Stamp, Wallace Shawn	United States	
The League of Extraordinary Gentlemen	Steve Norrington	Sean Connery, Shane West, Stuart Townsend	United States	
Little Longnose	Ilya Maksimov	Albert Asadullin, Yelena Shulman, Yevgeniya Igumnova	Russia	Animated
The Lord of the Rings: The Return of the King	Peter Jackson	Elijah Wood, Ian McKellen, Viggo Mortensen	United States; New Zealand	
The Medallion	Gordon Chan	Jackie Chan, Lee Evans, Claire Forlani	Hong Kong; United States	
Le monde vivant	Eugène Green	Adrien Michaux, Alexis Loret, Laurence Che	France; Belgium	
Northfork	Mark Polish, Michael Polish	James Woods, Nick Nolte, Claire Forlani	United States	
Nothing	Vincenzo Natali	David Hewlett, Andrew Miller, Marie-Josée Croze	Canada	Fantasy-comedy
Peter Pan	P. J. Hogan	Jason Isaacs, Jeremy Sumpter, Rachel Hurd-Wood	United States	
Pirates of the Caribbean: The Curse of the Black Pearl	Gore Verbinski	Johnny Depp, Geoffrey Rush, Orlando Bloom, Keira Knightley	United States	
Sinbad: Legend of the Seven Seas	Tim Johnson, Patrick Gilmore	Brad Pitt, Catherine Zeta Jones, Michelle Pfeiffer	United States	Fantasy adventure
Underworld	Len Wiseman	Kate Beckinsale, Scott Speedman, Michael Sheen	United States	Romantic fantasy
A Wrinkle in Time	John Kent Harrison	Katie Stuart, Gregory Smith, David Dorfman	Canada	Children's fantasy, fantasy adventure
2004
Alyosha Popovich and Tugarin Zmei	Konstantin Bronzit	Sergei Makovetsky, Ivan Krasko	Russia	Animated, part of The Three Bogatyrs series
Blade: Trinity	David S. Goyer	Wesley Snipes, Ryan Reynolds, Jessica Biel	United States	Superhero film/fantasy horror
Earthsea	Robert Lieberman	Shawn Ashmore, Kristin Kreuk, Isabella Rossellini, Danny Glover	United States	Epic fantasy
Dark Kingdom: The Dragon King	Uli Edel	Benno Fürmann, Kristanna Loken	Germany	Historical fantasy
Ella Enchanted	Tommy O'Haver	Anne Hathaway, Hugh Dancy, Cary Elwes	United States	Romantic fantasy comedy
George and the Dragon	Tom Reeve	James Purefoy, Piper Perabo, Patrick Swayze	United States	
Harry Potter and the Prisoner of Azkaban	Alfonso Cuarón	Daniel Radcliffe, Rupert Grint, Emma Watson	United Kingdom; United States	Fantasy/coming-of-age/drama
Hellboy	Guillermo del Toro	Ron Perlman, John Hurt, Selma Blair	United States	Superhero film
House of Flying Daggers	Zhang Yimou	Andy Lau, Takeshi Kaneshiro, Zhang Ziyi	China; Hong Kong	Historical Wuxia fantasy
Howl's Moving Castle	Hayao Miyazaki		Japan	
If Only	Gil Junger	Jennifer Love Hewitt, Paul Nicholls	United States	
Kamikaze Girls	Tetsuya Nakashima	Kyoko Fukada, Anna Tsuchiya	Japan	
Night Watch	Timur Bekmambetov	Konstantin Khabensky, Vladimir Menshov, Valery Zolotukhin	Russia	Fantasy horror
The Polar Express	Robert Zemeckis	Tom Hanks, Nona Gaye, Peter Scolari	United States	Animated fantasy drama
Red Riding Hood	Randal Kleiser	Daniel Roebuck, Joey Fatone, Debi Mazar	United States	
Shrek 2	Andrew Adamson, Conrad Vernon, Kelly Asbury	Mike Myers, Eddie Murphy, Cameron Diaz, Antonio Banderas	United States	Fantasy comedy parody
Strings	Anders Ronnow Klarlund	Ian Hart, Catherine McCormack, Julian Glover	Denmark	
Touch of Pink	Ian Iqbal Rashid	Jimi Mistry, Kyle MacLachlan, Kristen Holden-Ried	Canada	
Van Helsing	Stephen Sommers	Hugh Jackman, Kate Beckinsale, Richard Roxburgh	United States	Fantasy horror
Yu-Gi-Oh! The Movie: Pyramid of Light	Hatsuki Tsuji		United States; Japan	Anime film
2005
The Adventures of Sharkboy and Lavagirl in 3-D	Robert Rodriguez	Taylor Lautner, Taylor Dooley, Cayden Boyd	United States	Superhero comedy
Bewitched	Nora Ephron	Nicole Kidman, Will Ferrell, Shirley MacLaine	United States	Fantasy comedy
Beauty and the Beast	David Lister	Jane March, William Gregory Lee, Justin Whalin	United Kingdom; South Africa	
BloodRayne	Uwe Boll	Kristanna Loken, Michael Madsen, Michelle Rodriguez	Germany; United States	Dark fantasy
The Brothers Grimm	Terry Gilliam	Matt Damon, Heath Ledger, Jonathan Pryce	United States; United Kingdom	Period fantasy adventure
Bug Me Not!	Chi-Leung Law	Isabella Leong, Polin Chen, Gillian Chung	Hong Kong	
Charlie and the Chocolate Factory	Tim Burton	Johnny Depp, Freddie Highmore, David Kelly	United States	Fantasy comedy
A Chinese Tall Story	Jeffrey Lau	Nicholas Tse, Charlene Choi, Fan Bingbing	Hong Kong	
The Chronicles of Narnia: The Lion, the Witch and the Wardrobe	Andrew Adamson	Georgie Henley, Skandar Keynes, William Moseley	United Kingdom; United States	Epic fantasy
Constantine	Francis Lawrence	Keanu Reeves, Rachel Weisz, Tilda Swinton	United States	Urban fantasy
Corpse Bride	Tim Burton, Mike Johnson	Johnny Depp, Helena Bonham Carter	United States; United Kingdom	Gothic fantasy
Dungeons & Dragons: Wrath of the Dragon God	Gerry Lively	Mark Dymond, Clemency Burton-Hill, Bruce Payne	United States	Historical fantasy adventure
The Great Yokai War	Takashi Miike	Kiyoshiro Imawano, Mai Takahashi, Sadawo Abe	Japan	
Harry Potter and the Goblet of Fire	Mike Newell	Daniel Radcliffe, Rupert Grint, Emma Watson	United Kingdom; United States	Fantasy/coming-of-age/drama
Hercules	Roger Young	Paul Telfer, Sean Astin, Leelee Sobieski	United States	Mythological fantasy
MirrorMask	Dave McKean	Jason Barry, Rob Brydon, Stephanie Leonidas, Gina McKee	United States	
Nanny McPhee	Kirk Jones	Emma Thompson, Colin Firth, Angela Lansbury	United States; United Kingdom	Period fantasy comedy
The Promise	Chen Kaige	Hiroyuki Sanada, Jang Dong-gun, Cecilia Cheung	United States; China	
Son of the Mask	Lawrence Guterman	Jamie Kennedy, Alan Cumming, Liam Falconer	United States	Superhero film
2006
Aquamarine	Elizabeth Allen	Sara Paxton, Jake McDorman, Arielle Kebbel	United States; Australia	Fantasy comedy
Arthur and the Minimoys	Luc Besson	Freddie Highmore, Madonna, Jimmy Fallon	France; United States	Animated fantasy adventure
Azur & Asmar: The Princes' Quest	Michel Ocelot	Cyril Mourali, Karim M'Riba, Hiam Abbass, Patrick Timsit	France	Animated fantasy adventure
Beowulf & Grendel	Sturla Gunnarsson	Gerard Butler, Stellan Skarsgård, Sarah Polley	Iceland; United Kingdom; Canada	Fantasy horror
Click	Frank Coraci	Adam Sandler, Kate Beckinsale, Christopher Walken	United States	Fantasy comedy
Day Watch	Timur Bekmambetov	Konstantin Khabensky, Maria Poroshina, Vladimir Menshov	Russia	Fantasy horror
Dobrynya Nikitich and Zmey Gorynych	Ilya Maksimov	Sergey Makovetskiy, Andrey Tolubeyev	Russia	Animated, part of The Three Bogatyrs series
Eragon	Stefen Fangmeier	Jeremy Irons, Ed Speleers, John Malkovich	United States	Epic fantasy
The Fall	Tarsem Singh	Lee Pace, Catinca Untaru, Justine Waddell	India; United States	Fantasy drama
The Illusionist	Neil Burger	Edward Norton, Paul Giamatti, Jessica Biel, Rufus Sewell	United States; Czech Republic	Period fantasy thriller
Jade Warrior	Tommi Eronen	Zhang Jingchu, Krista Kosonen, Markku Peltola	Finland; China	Historical Wuxia fantasy
Lady in the Water	M. Night Shyamalan	Paul Giamatti, Bryce Dallas Howard, Jeffrey Wright	United States	Fantasy thriller
The Lake House	Alejandro Agresti	Keanu Reeves, Sandra Bullock, Dylan Walsh	United States	Romantic fantasy drama
Night at the Museum	Shawn Levy	Ben Stiller, Carla Gugino, Dick Van Dyke	United States	Fantasy comedy
Pan's Labyrinth	Guillermo del Toro	Ariadna Gil, Ivana Baquero, Sergi López	Mexico	Period fantasy thriller
Penelope	Mark Palansky	Christina Ricci, James McAvoy, Catherine O'Hara	United States; United Kingdom	Romantic fantasy comedy
Pirates of the Caribbean: Dead Man's Chest	Gore Verbinski	Johnny Depp, Orlando Bloom, Keira Knightley, Bill Nighy, Jack Davenport	United States	Historical fantasy adventure
The Prestige	Christopher Nolan	Hugh Jackman, Christian Bale, Michael Caine, Scarlett Johansson	United States; United Kingdom	Period fantasy thriller
Prince Vladimir	Yuriy Kulakov	Sergei Bezrukov, Vladimir Gostyukhin	Russia	Animated
The Restless	Cho Dong-Oh	Huh Joon-ho, Kim Tae-hee, Jung Woo-sung	South Korea; China	
The Shaggy Dog	Brian Robbins	Tim Allen, Robert Downey Jr., Kristin Davis	United States	Fantasy comedy
The Santa Clause 3: The Escape Clause	Michael Lembeck	Tim Allen, Elizabeth Mitchell, Martin Short	United States	Fantasy comedy
Stranger Than Fiction	Marc Forster	Will Ferrell, Maggie Gyllenhaal, Dustin Hoffman	United States	Romantic fantasy comedy
Tales from Earthsea	Goro Miyazaki		Japan	Anime film
Ten Nights of Dreams	Various director		Japan	
Underworld: Evolution	Len Wiseman	Kate Beckinsale, Scott Speedman, Tony Curran	United States	Fantasy horror
Wolfhound from the Greyhound Clan	Nikolai Lebedev	Aleksandr Bukharov, Oksana Akinshina	Russia	
Wristcutters: A Love Story	Goran Dukić	Patrick Fugit, Shannyn Sossamon, Shea Whigham	United States	Romantic supernatural fantasy
Young Wolfhound	Oleg Fomin	Aleksandr Bukharov, Andrei Chadov	Russia	TV prequel to Wolfhound from the Greyhound Clan
2007
300	Zack Snyder	Gerard Butler, Lena Headey, Dominic West	United States	Historical fantasy
Beowulf	Robert Zemeckis	Ray Winstone, John Malkovich, Robin Wright Penn	United States	Animated historical fantasy
Bridge to Terabithia	Gabor Csupo	Josh Hutcherson, AnnaSophia Robb, Zooey Deschanel	United States	Fantasy adventure
Dororo	Akihiko Shiota	Satoshi Tsumabuki, Kou Shibasaki	Japan	
El Muerto	Brian Cox	Wilmer Valderrama, Angie Cepeda, Joel David Moore	United States	Dark urban fantasy
Enchanted	Kevin Lima	Amy Adams, Patrick Dempsey, James Marsden	United States	Romantic fantasy comedy
Evan Almighty	Tom Shadyac	Steve Carell, Morgan Freeman, Lauren Graham	United States	Fantasy comedy
Fred Claus	David Dobkin	Vince Vaughn, Paul Giamatti, John Michael Higgins	United States	Fantasy comedy
Ghost Rider	Mark Steven Johnson	Nicolas Cage, Eva Mendes, Wes Bentley	United States	Superhero film
The Golden Compass	Chris Weitz	Nicole Kidman, Dakota Blue Richards, Daniel Craig	United States	Fantasy adventure
Happily N'Ever After	Paul J. Bolger	Sarah Michelle Gellar, Freddie Prinze, Jr.	Germany; United States	Fantasy comedy
Harry Potter and the Order of the Phoenix	David Yates	Daniel Radcliffe, Rupert Grint, Emma Watson	United Kingdom; United States	Fantasy/coming-of-age/drama
Hogfather	Vadim Jean	David Jason, Marc Warren, Michelle Dockery	United States	
Ilya Muromets and Nightingale the Robber	Vladimir Totopchin	Sergei Makovetsky, Andrei Tolubeyev, Oleg Tabakov	Russia	Animated, part of The Three Bogatyrs series
In the Name of the King: A Dungeon Siege Tale	Uwe Boll	Jason Statham, Leelee Sobieski, John Rhys-Davies	Canada; United States	Historical fantasy
Mr. Magorium's Wonder Emporium	Zach Helm	Dustin Hoffman, Natalie Portman, Jason Bateman	United States; Canada	Fantasy comedy
Pirates of the Caribbean: At World's End	Gore Verbinski	Johnny Depp, Geoffrey Rush, Keira Knightley, Orlando Bloom	United States	Historical fantasy adventure
The Seeker	David Cunningham	Alexander Ludwig, Christopher Eccleston, Ian McShane	United States	Fantasy adventure
Sex and Death 101	Daniel Waters	Simon Baker, Winona Ryder, Patton Oswalt	United States	
Shrek the Third	Chris Miller	Mike Myers, Eddie Murphy, Cameron Diaz, Antonio Banderas	United States	Fantasy comedy parody
Slipstream	Anthony Hopkins	Anthony Hopkins, Stella Arroyave, Christian Slater	United States	Romantic fantasy
Stardust	Matthew Vaughn	Claire Danes, Michelle Pfeiffer, Robert De Niro	United States	Period fantasy comedy
Tin Man	Nick Willing	Zooey Deschanel, Alan Cumming, Neal McDonough, Raoul Trujillo	United States	Fantasy adventure
The Water Horse: Legend of the Deep	Jay W. Russell	Emily Watson, Alex Etel, David Morrissey	United States	Period fantasy adventure
2008
Ba'al: The Storm God	Paul Ziller	Jeremy London, Stefanie von Pfetten, Scott Hylands	United States; Canada	Fantasy adventure
Bedtime Stories	Adam Shankman	Adam Sandler, Guy Pearce, Keri Russell	United States	Fantasy comedy
The Chronicles of Narnia: Prince Caspian	Andrew Adamson	Ben Barnes, Skandar Keynes, Georgie Henley	United States; United Kingdom	Epic fantasy
City of Ember	Gil Kenan	David Ryall, Ian McElhinney, Harry Treadaway	United States	Science fiction fantasy
The Curious Case of Benjamin Button	David Fincher	Brad Pitt, Cate Blanchett, Tilda Swinton	United States	Romantic fantasy drama
Dasavathaaram	K. S. Ravikumar	Kamal Haasan, Asin Thottumkal, Mallika Sherawat	India	Fantasy adventure
Delgo	Marc F. Adler, Jason Maurer		United States	Animated fantasy comedy
The Forbidden Kingdom	Rob Minkoff	Michael Angarano, Jackie Chan, Jet Li	United States; China	Fantasy comedy
Ghost Town	David Koepp	Ricky Gervais, Téa Leoni, Greg Kinnear	United States	Supernatural fantasy comedy
Hellboy II: The Golden Army	Guillermo del Toro	Ron Perlman, Doug Jones, Selma Blair	United States	Superhero film
Horton Hears a Who!	Jimmy Hayward, Steve Martino	Jim Carrey, Steve Carell	United States	Animated fantasy comedy
Inkheart	Iain Softley	Brendan Fraser, Paul Bettany, Jim Broadbent	United States	Fantasy adventure
Journey to the Center of the Earth 3-D	Eric Brevig	Brendan Fraser, Josh Hutcherson, Anita Briem	United States	Science fiction fantasy adventure
Krabat	Marco Kreuzpaintner	David Kross, Daniel Brühl, Christian Redl	Germany	
The Mummy: Tomb of the Dragon Emperor	Rob Cohen	Brendan Fraser, Jet Li, Michelle Yeoh	United States	Fantasy adventure/horror
The Other Side of the Tracks	A.D. Calvo	Brendan Fehr, Chad Lindberg, Tania Raymonde	United States	Supernatural fantasy drama
Over Her Dead Body	Jeff Lowell	Eva Longoria, Paul Rudd, Lake Bell	United States	Romantic supernatural fantasy comedy
The Pirates Who Don't Do Anything: A VeggieTales Movie	Mike Nawrocki		United States	Animated fantasy comedy
Ponyo on the Cliff by the Sea	Hayao Miyazaki		Japan	Anime film
The Secret of Moonacre	Gabor Csupo	Ioan Gruffudd, Tim Curry, Natascha McElhone	Hungary; France; United States; United Kingdom	
The Spiderwick Chronicles	Mark Waters	Freddie Highmore, Sarah Bolger, David Strathairn	United States	Fantasy adventure
Spike	Robert Beaucage	Edward Gusts, Sarah Livingston Evans, Anna-Marie Wayne	United States	
The Tale of Despereaux	Robert Stevenhagen, Sam Fell	Matthew Broderick, Dustin Hoffman, Emma Watson	United States	Animated fantasy adventure
Tinker Bell	Bradley Raymond	Mae Whitman, Kristin Chenoweth, Raven-Symoné	United States	Animated fantasy adventure
Twilight	Catherine Hardwicke	Kristen Stewart, Robert Pattinson, Peter Facinelli	United States	Romantic fantasy
2009
17 Again	Burr Steers	Zac Efron, Leslie Mann, Thomas Lennon	United States	Fantasy comedy
The Book of Masters	Vadim Sokolovsky	Irina Apeksimova, Valentin Gaft, Leonid Kuravlev	Russia	
Coraline	Henry Selick	Dakota Fanning, Teri Hatcher, Jennifier Saunders	United States	Animated fantasy thriller
Disney's A Christmas Carol	Robert Zemeckis	Jim Carrey, Gary Oldman, Colin Firth	United States	Animated supernatural period fantasy comedy
Vølvens forbandelse	Mogens Hagedorn Christiansen	Jonas Wandschneider, Clara Maria Bahamondes, Jakob Cedergren	Denmark	Adventure, family
Dragonball Evolution	James Wong	Justin Chatwin, James Marsters, Emmy Rossum, Jamie Chung, Joon Park, Chow Yun-fat	United States	Adventure
First Squad	Yoshiharu Ashino	Elena Chebaturkina, Michael Tikhonov, Ludmila Shuvalova	Russia; Japan	Supernatural anime
Ghosts of Girlfriends Past	Mark Waters	Matthew McConaughey, Jennifer Garner, Breckin Meyer	United States	Comedy
Harry Potter and the Half-Blood Prince	David Yates	Daniel Radcliffe, Rupert Grint, Emma Watson	United Kingdom; United States	Fantasy/coming-of-age/drama/romance
The Imaginarium of Doctor Parnassus	Terry Gilliam	Christopher Plummer, Tom Waits, Heath Ledger	United States	Supernatural period fantasy
Ink	Jamin Winans	Christopher Soren Kelly, Quinn Hunchar, Jessica Duffy	United States	Supernatural fantasy drama
Knights of Bloodsteel		Natassia Malthe, Christopher Jacot, Dru Viergever	Canada; United States	Historical fantasy adventure
Land of the Lost	Brad Silberling	Will Ferrell, Danny McBride, Anna Friel	United States	Science fiction fantasy comedy
The Lovely Bones	Peter Jackson	Saoirse Ronan, Mark Wahlberg, Rachel Weisz	United States; New Zealand	Supernatural fantasy
Night at the Museum: Battle of the Smithsonian	Shawn Levy	Ben Stiller, Amy Adams, Hank Azaria	United States	Fantasy comedy
The Princess and the Frog	John Musker, Ron Clements	Anika Noni Rose, Bruno Campos, Keith David	United States	Animated fantasy comedy
The Secret of Kells	Tomm Moore		Ireland; Belgium; France	Animated
Shorts	Robert Rodriguez	James Spader, William H. Macy, Leslie Mann	United States	Fantasy comedy
The Twilight Saga: New Moon	Chris Weitz	Robert Pattinson, Kristen Stewart, Taylor Lautner	United States	Romantic fantasy horror
Under the Mountain	Jonathan King	Sam Neill, Oliver Driver, Matthew Chamberlain, Bruce Hopkins	New Zealand	Fantasy adventure
Underworld: Rise of the Lycans	Patrick Tatopoulos	Bill Nighy, Michael Sheen, Rhona Mitra	United States	Fantasy horror
Wonder Woman	Lauren Montgomery	Keri Russell, Nathan Fillion, Alfred Molina	United States	Animated superhero film
Where the Wild Things Are	Spike Jonze	Max Records, Catherine Keener, James Gandolfini	United States	Fantasy drama
