= Moonzy: Homecoming =

- Theatrical release poster
- Directed by: Konstantin Bronzit
- Written by: Konstantin Bronzit; Darina Shmidt; Dmitriy Vysotskiy
- Based on: Moonzy
- Produced by: Aleksandr Boyarsky; Sergey Selyanov; Anton Zlatopolskiy
- Starring: Anna Slynko; Yuliya Zorkina; Oleg Kulikovich; Anatoly Petrov; Mariya Tsvetkova; Valerii Smekalov
- Music by: Mikhail Chertishchev
- Production companies: Melnitsa Animation Studio; CTB Film Company
- Distributed by: Volga
- Release date: 29 August 2024
- Running time: 78 minutes
- Country: Russia
- Language: Russian
- Budget: ₽150 million
- Box office: $5.4 million

Moonzy: Homecoming, also known as Moonzy. Returning Home (Russian: Лунтик. Возвращение домой, romanized: Luntik. Vozvrashchenie domoy), formerly known as Moonzy and the Big Journey (Russian: Лунтик и большое путешествие, romanized: Luntik i bol'shoe puteshestvie, lit. 'Luntik and the Big Journey') is a 2024 Russian animated adventure film directed and written by Konstantin Bronzit, and based on the Moonzy television series. The plot follows Moonzy, who goes on an adventure to return to the moon, by going to a mountain.

A sequel, Moonzy: The Other Side of the Moon, was released on 27 August 2026.

== Plot ==
An elderly moth scientist discovers the landing of a shell piece from the moon, falling into a nearby pond, and goes outside to retrieve it. Moonzy, a lunar bee, emerges from the shell.

One year later, Moonzy, along with his friends, Flip, a grasshopper, and Woopsie and Poopsie, twin caterpillars, visit the moth at his laboratory to see his shell. There, the moth hypnotizes Moonzy, where he have a vision of him being on the moon, his home, and his mother, when a meteorite suddenly struck his home that sent him flying into Earth. After a struggle, Moonzy and her friends acquire the shell before fleeing the lab. The moth pursues and later sedates them. The next day, the group wake up on a leaf, finding a mountain. En route, they are cornered by the moth, but they escape on a dragonfly.

Afterwards, Flip accidentally knocks Moonzy's shell into a hole. This prompts the group help to help Moonzy recover it, inadvertently awakening a purple centipede in the process, who begins to chase them. They incapacitate it and finally reach the mountain.

Before Moonzy can return to the moon, the centipede frees himself and ambushes the group. In the chaos, the moth appears and throws a bag of sleeping pellets onto Moonzy's moonshell, allowing him to defeat the centipede with it. Afterwards, Moonzy proceeds to return to the moon, where he reconciles with his mother. Saddened about missing his friends, Moonzy decides to returns to Earth, reconciling with his friends. Meanwhile, the centipede climbs back up the cliff it fell into, revealing itself to have survived.

== Cast ==
- Anna Slynko as Moonzy, a purple lunar bee
- Mariya Tsvetkova as Moonzy's mother
- Yuliya Zorkina as Flip, a grasshopper / Granny Annie
- Oleg Kulikovich as Woopsie and Poopsie, twin caterpillars
- Anatoly Petrov as General Stringer / Mr. Webber the Spider / Mr. Diggins
- Valerii Smekalov as an old moth scientist

== Production ==
The original script for the film was written in 2013 and finalized in early 2023. The film was officially announced in March 2023. On 17 March 2023, Konstantin Bronzit stated that the film will be a "road movie" and will be finished by the end of 2023, but at the time, the release date was not yet announced. On September 2023, Bronzit revealed that the film would feature a villain, its details not yet disclosed at the time, and that the film would be completed by April 2024.

== Release ==
The film was released in Russia on 29 August 2024.

== Reception ==
Moonzy: Homecoming has an 80 score based on two critic reviews on Kritikanstvo.

== Sequel ==
A direct sequel, Moonzy: The Other Side of the Moon (Russian: Лунтик. Обратная сторона Луны, romanized: Luntik. Obratnaya storona Luny), was released on 27 August 2026.
