= Ivan Tsarevich and the Gray Wolf 3 =

- Theatrical release poster
- Directed by: Darina Schmidt
- Screenplay by: Leonid Barats; Rostislav Khayit; Sergei Petreikov
- Produced by: Sergei Selyanov; Aleksandr Boyarsky
- Starring: Nikita Yefremov; Tatiana Bunina
- Music by: Mikhail Chertischev
- Production companies: Melnitsa Animation Studio; CTB
- Release date: 1 January 2016
- Running time: 76 minutes
- Country: Russia
- Language: Russian
- Budget: $4 million
- Box office: $10 271 463

Ivan Tsarevich and the Gray Wolf 3 also commonly known as Prince Ivan and the Grey Wolf 3 (Russian: Иван Царевич и Серый волк 3, romanized: Ivan Tsarevich i Seriy volk 3) is a 2016 Russian full-length traditionally-animated film directed by Darina Schmidt.

== Plot ==
In a faraway kingdom, the tsar turns 150 years old and decides that it is time to rest from state affairs and so he retires and sets off towards the country wilderness. Tsar Ivan Tsarevich and his friend Gray Wolf are left to guard the kingdom. Vasilisa resents her husband because he has not organized a wedding trip abroad for her. The couple, together with the Scholar Cat and the Gray Wolf, sit down on the magic flying carpet and set out on a journey. They leave an ordinary scarecrow behind them, which turns to life, and on the place where the scarecrow stood a source of hypnotic crimson jam mysteriously appears. They meet leaders from other world countries, who are interested in investing in the jam. They set up a summit with the leaders.

Upon returning, they find that the kingdom has changed in many ways, with the jam fueling citizens to build faster than humanly possible. The scarecrow introduces himself as Pal Palych, and quickly wins over Vasilisa. That night, Gray Wolf overhears Pal Palych discussing something nefarious, but ends up being stuck in a chimney. Pal Palych meets with Ivan and uses dark magic to steal Ivan's body, leaving Ivan's soul in Vasilisa's toy monkey. Grey Wolf frees himself and tells who he thinks is Ivan about Pal Palych's plan, but Pal disposes of him using a trapdoor. Vasilisa falls for the new and improved Ivan, while the real Ivan tries multiple times to get her attention but fails.

Ivan manages to tell a captive Grey Wolf the truth, and they are both saved by the tsar, who leads them to his old fried Nightingale-Bandit. Nightingale-Bandit tells them the true story of Pal in the form of tattoos on the back of is friend Kesha. Pal was a scarecrow summoned from a demonic ritual who managed to take over the kingdom in the form of mind-control jam, which would eventually leave the people in a vegetable-like state. He went crazed with power and forgot to give the citizens their daily dose, and in return, they killed him and spread his parts around the swamp, before Ivan put him back together. The tsar reveals that the buildings and achievements that the people have made were hallucinations created by the jam, and that they have an antidote.

On the day of the summit, the tsar and Gray Wolf disguise themselves as world leaders, while Nightingale-Bandit and Kesha try to hook up the jam fountain to the antidote. Ivan gets separated from the group and discovers Pal's secret underground room with a scarecrow army, before going back aboveground. The world leaders drink the antidote and Pal reveals his true colors to everyone, before releasing the army to fight the people. Ivan realizes the only way to defeat him to destroy his staff (formerly his body). He and Gray Wolf grab it, but are confronted by Pal who nearly breaks Gray Wolf's jaw, before he is killed by Vasilisa when she breaks the staff. The scarecrow army is destroyed and Ivan's soul is returned to his body.

== Cast ==
- Nikita Yefremov - Ivan Tsarevich
- Tatiana Bunina - Vasilisa
- Ivan Okhlobystin - The King
- Mikhail Boyarsky - Scholar Cat
- Maria Tsvetkova - correspondent, magic carpet
- Mikhail Khrustalyov - Palk Palkovich (Pal Palych)
- Aleksandr Boyarsky - Gray Wolf
- Anatoly Petrov - nightingale-bandit
- Dmitri Vysotsky - Thin one, singer
- Oleg Kulikovich - Fat one
- Roman Nikitin - Kesha "four shelves"
- Konstantin Bronzit - Pike
- Aleksandr Demich - Ivan Monkey
- Andrey Kuznetsov - other episodes
- Yakov Petrov - German butcher / President of the United States
