= Rostov State Puppet Theatre =

Coordinates: 47.2258°N 39.7281°E

The Rostov State Puppet Theater
- Ростовский государственный театр кукол (Russian)
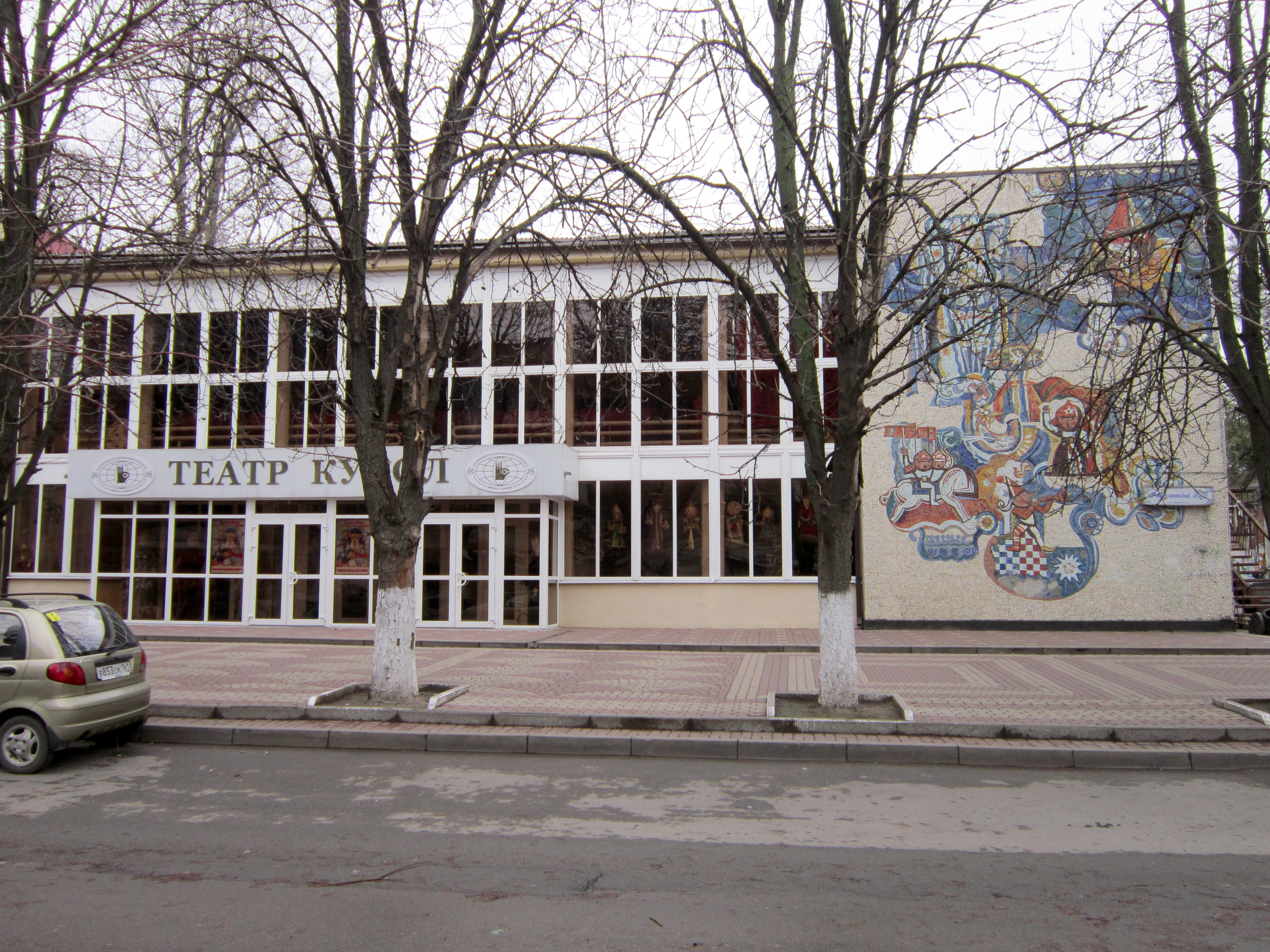

- Location within Russia
- Location: 46, Universitetsky Lane, Rostov-on-Don Russia

History
- Built: 1935

The Rostov State Puppet Theater (Russian:Ростовский государственный театр кукол) is a puppet theater founded in Rostov-on-Don in 1935. The building is located at 46 Universitetsky Lane.

== History ==
Rostov State Puppet Theater was established by a group of puppeteers who had started to perform for children in 1920s. The theater first opened its doors in 1935. Over the years, the puppet theater has been headed by numerous directors, including Boris Sakhnovsky (a student of Konstantin Stanislavsky) and Leonid Stelmakhovich (a student of Vsevolod Meyerhold).

The theater still recognizes its founding performers: S. Isaeva, Merited Artist of Russia; M. Kushnarenko (whose granddaughter Elena works at the theater today); S. Ulybashev, L. Chubkov, G. Pidko, A. Derkach, and many others. Over its history, the Rostov Puppet Theater has staged over 5000 plays.

The theater's repertoire features classic plays including "Turnip", "Ivan Tsarevich and the Grey wolf", Buzzy-Wuzzy Busy Fly, Teremok, "Maryyushka and the baba-yaga", "Fear Takes Molehills For Mountains", "Gold tea", "Pirate sweet tooth", "Little Mermaid", "A wolf and kids", Buratino, "Little Red Riding Hood" and many others.

== Building ==
The theater's current building was constructed in the mid-1960s on a site that had been occupied since 1909 by the Annunciation Greek Church, using the demolished church's foundation and walls.
