= Horse Julius and Big Horse Racing =

2020 Russian film

- Theatrical release poster
- Directed by: Darina Schmidt; Konstantin Feoktistov
- Written by: Vadim Sveshnikov; Maxim Sveshnikov; Aleksandr Boyarsky
- Produced by: Aleksandr Boyarsky; Sergey Selyanov
- Starring: Sergey Makovetsky; Sergey Burunov; Dmitry Vysotsky; Maria Ovsyannikova; Lia Medvedeva
- Edited by: Sergey Glezin
- Music by: Aleksandr Boyarsky; Georgiy Zheryakov (ru)
- Production companies: Melnitsa Animation Studio; CTB Film Company
- Distributed by: Sony Pictures Releasing CIS (Note: Distributed under the Columbia Pictures label.)
- Release date: 31 December 2020 (Russia)
- Running time: 77 minutes
- Country: Russia
- Language: Russian

Horse Julius and Big Horse Racing (Russian: Конь Юлий и большие скачки, romanized: Kon' Juliy i Bol'shie Skachki, lit. '"The Horse Julius and the Great Races') is a 2020 animated Russian folklore spin-off film written by Vadim Sveshnikov, Maxim Sveshnikov, Alexsandr Boyarskiy and directed by Darina Schmidt and Konstantin Feoktistov. The writers and producers of The Three Bogatyrs resumed production in the tenth film of the Russian animated saga. Veteran producers for the series as well as CTB Film Company, Sergey Selyanov and Alexander Boyarsky resumed production for the film. Horse Julius and Big Horse Racing is the sequel to Three Heroes and The Heiress to the Throne (2018) and is dedicated to the feats of the character Bogatyr horse Julius.

Alyosha Popvich and his horse Julius have been folk heroes ever since they have defended Kievan Rus from attacks of villains. Julius always accompanied the hero as they found themselves in the very center of dangerous events. Prince Vladimir himself proclaimed Julius as the court horse. Julius asks to be married to the royal mare of the East - Zvezda. It is up to Julius to win a race to prove his status for marriage.

Melnitsa Animation Studio from St.Petersburg was the animation production studio in charge of design for the film. The studio uses traditional animation for the series known internationally as The Three Heroes. The road trip comedy was released in Russia on 31 December 2020 by Sony Pictures Releasing CIS.

== Plot ==
At the borders of the Kiev Principality, three heroes and the horse Julius save Sultan Rashid from the robbers of his brother Arkan. Arkan tried to take away from his brother a Mare he bought at auction named Zvezda. Julius, the royal horse for the bogatyrs asks for the hand, that is, the hooves of the Royal princess Mare Zvezda of the East from Sultan Rashid. However, Julius cannot boast of his own pedigree, and according to the rules of royal marriages, only a candidate of equal status can marry a person of such bloodlines.

Suddenly, Julius comes up with the idea of asking the Prince of Kiev to become his matchmaker. Julius rushes to Kiev, but the Prince is engaged in other matters. Julius turns to the Prince of Kiev for help, but is refused. However, Julius does not to give up. Under the cover of the night when everyone is sleeping, Julius sneaks into the castle. He kidnaps the Prince and forcibly takes him to the Sultan for matchmaking. Meanwhile, the bogatyrs also have business on the East side. Everyone will meet at the big races, where the winner will get everything.

== Cast ==
Character	Russian Actor
Julius	Dmitry Vysotsky
Prince of Kiev	Sergey Makovetsky
Sultan Rashid	Sergey Burunov
Alyosha Popovich	Oleg Kulikovich
Dobrynya Nikitich	Valery Solovyov
Ilya Muromets	Dmitry Bykovsky
Alyonushka	Maria Ovsyannikova
Lubava	Liya Medvedeva
Nastasya	Yulia Zorkina
Ashan	Maxim Sergeev
Shah	Valentin Morozov

== Production ==
=== Development ===
In November 2018, announcement was made of the new installment to the series titled Horse Julius and Big Horse Racing. The creators of the series intended to present a feature film on one of the series' most beloved characters, horse Julius. The horse has been depicted as a sarcastic but faithful bay horse with a red mane. The character's Homeric punch lines are famous throughout the series. Julius' catchphrase "Don't make my horseshoes laugh..." was part of a contest at the radio station Humor FM (Юмор FM). In 2018, Smotrim collected the top ten jokes of Horse Julius. Horse Julius formerly known as Gaius Julius Caesar, is developed as a paradox character who is a bibliophile at the library but at the same time acts in a confused or ineffectual way.

The script written by the Sveshnikovs and Alexander Boyarsky developed the characteristic of Julius and in general the comedy of the series into a spin-off type film. The theme of developing one's innate abilities and talents is described in the film through the bumbling character Julius who despite flaws can manage to find friends and allies while at the same time execute ambitious plans as seen in the finale international horse race competition.

The film is the tenth cartoon in the cycle of The Three Heroes based on Russian culture and history. The film series depicts the titular bogatyr knights in animated format. Darina Schmidt, who was previously worked for such films as Luntik and Smeshariki became the director of the film. Konstantin Feoktistov who has previously worked for the film Three Heroes and the Princess of Egypt also was director, with the film becoming his fifth production for the franchise.

In March 2018, Sergey Selyanov presented the film to the Cinema Foundation. Leading up to the holiday season of 2020, cinema chains KARO and Kinomax allied in a strategic joint advertising merger that will bolster the Russian film industry. As the most dynamic and number one cinema market in Europe in terms of attendance in 2020, despite the difficulties of COVID-19, the Russian film industry will see a host of films as it enters the fourth quarter including Horse Julius and Big Horse Racing. The film as part of the New Year releases heralded a new record in Russian film industry. The share of Russian cinema reached 50% compared to the share in 2019. The film was designated as a national film approved for distribution in the fourth quarter of 2020. Sony Pictures signed a production pact with Sergey Selyanov's CTB Film Company. The partnership is intended to benefit both companies as Sony Pictures will be able to branch out its portfolio while CTB Film Company will be able to increase its presence in the national film market. The association's first set of films to be released by the end of the year are animated films Barkers: Mind the Cats! and Horse Julius and Big Horse Racing.

Film producer Alexander Boyarsky, states the film is "A fun, good New Year's picture, a funny character, we love him, we hope that the audience also loves him. And the story of his matchmaking formed the basis of the film, around it, in general, everything revolves around the idea." The film is catered to the family audience with emphasis on a festive mood. The film was one of the anticipated releases of the New Year. Voice actor Sergey Burunov states, "This is the first sultan in my life. He's kind, he's cunning, he's rich, he's smart. It wasn't me. In the story, our horse Julius fell in love. This time it is serious. He asks for the hooves of the royal mare Star of the East from Sultan Rashid, that is, from me. The love of the horse is strong, but whether the sultan will give up his main treasure is a big question."

=== Critical response ===
Intermedia noted "Horse Julius and Big Horse Racing is a spin-off of the mega-popular animated series about Three Heroes, which has not lost ground for 16 years." The film was "shot with a fair amount of humor, ingenuity and excitement." Kino Mail stated, the style of the film is still the same: "The film will be of interest primarily to loyal fans of the franchise — as before, it is a comedy adventure film for young children and family viewing with them. Stylistically, it has not changed in any way, and fans of the series will be pleased with all the same bright colors, cartoon images of heroes, dynamic editing and cheerful music."

Kinoafisha stated the eponymous horse Julius, "first appeared on screens in 2004, the character waited 16 years to get a solo album." The review stated, the film can be watched separately from the series because it is a spin-off movie and is the "story is more for big fans of the franchise about the Three Heroes." The film became one of the top twenty most watched film in KinoPoisk HD film service in February 2021.

== Accolades ==
Award	Date of ceremony	Category	Recipient(s) and nominee(s)	Result
Suzdalfest	17 March 2021	Full-Length Animated Film	Horse Julius and Big Horse Racing	Nominated

== Adaptations ==
The film is part of the Three Heroes franchise that has spanned the decades since the historic 2004 release Alyosha Popovich and Tugarin the Snake. The animated series has become a behemoth in Russian animation industry that has won many prestigious international awards in the field of animation. These include a special jury prize at the Seoul festival, two prizes for best animation at the JUNIO film festival in Italy, and an award for best artistic achievement at the international children's and youth film festival in Iran. The Three Bogatryrs series is a recognized brand in the CIS countries such as Belarus and Ukraine. The series has the most audience in Russia.

== See also ==
- The Three Bogatyrs
- Russian animation
- List of animated feature films of 2020
