= Luntik and His Friends =

Russian animated series

- Also known as: Moonzy and His Friends
- Genre: Children's television series; Comedy; Adventure; Preschool; Educational
- Created by: Darina Schmidt; Sarra Аnson (Anna Sarantseva)
- Developed by: Aleksandr Boyarsky
- Voices of: Yekaterina Gorokhovskaya; Yelena Shulman; Anatoly Petrov; Yuliya Rudina; Oleg Kulikovich; Mikhail Chernyak; Nataliya Danilova; Yelena Soloveva; Konstantin Bronzit; Svetlana Pismichenko; Olga Semenova; Anna Slynko; Yuliya Zorkina; Stanislav Sergeev; Aleksandr Boyarsky; Irina Obrezkova
- Theme music composer: Maksim Koshevarov
- Composers: Maksim Koshevarov (seasons 1–6); Sergey Zykov (seasons 3–6); Sergey Kuzmin (seasons 5–6); Mikhail Chertishchev (season 7–present)
- Country of origin: Russia
- Original language: Russian
- No. of seasons: 10
- No. of episodes: 572

Production
- Executive producer: Olga Tararina
- Running time: 4 minutes; 5 minutes; 6 minutes; 11 minutes
- Production company: Melnitsa Animation Studio

Original release
- Network: Russia; Russia-K; Mult
- Release: 1 September 2006 – 20 December 2024

Luntik and His Friends (Russian: Лунтик и его друзья), or simply Luntik (Russian: Лунтик) (also known as Moonzy in its English version), is a Russian animated series for infants, toddlers, and preschoolers.

== Plot ==
A little young creature named Luntik was born on the Moon, but he fell down off the moon and landing to the Earth, instead of falling on the ground he landed on the water. Luntik explores the swamp with his friends: Kuzya, Mila, and Luna.

== Characters ==
- Luntik (voiced by Yekaterina Gorokhovskaya and Anna Slynko)
- Kuzya (voiced by Yelena Shulman and Yuliya Zorkina)
- Mila (voiced by Yuliya Rudina)
- Pchelonok Tema (voiced by Svetlana Pismichenko, Yekaterina Gorokhovskaya, and Anna Slynko)
- Woopsen and Poopsen (voiced by Oleg Kulikovich)
- Baba Kapa (voiced by Svetlana Pismichenko, Yelena Shulman, and Yuliya Zorkina)
- General Sher (voiced by Anatoly Petrov and Aleksandr Boyarsky)
- Spider Shnyuk (voiced by Aleksandr Boyarsky)
- Korney Korneevich (voiced by Anatoly Petrov and Mikhail Chernyak)
- Peskar Ivanovich (voiced by Mikhail Chernyak)
- Rak Chikibryak (voiced by Konstantin Bronzit and Mikhail Chernyak)
- Totya Motya (voiced by Konstantin Bronzit, Mikhail Chernyak, and Nataliya Danilova)
- Piyavka (voiced by Yelena Soloveva)
- Toad Klava (voiced by Konstantin Bronzit and Nataliya Danilova)
- Elina (voiced by Olga Semenova, Yuliya Rudina, and Irina Obrezkova)
- Luna (voiced by Irina Obrezkova)

== TV broadcast ==
In Russia, the show premiered on the TV channel Russia-1 and was broadcast for 7 years from 1 September 2006 until 15 May 2014. On 16 June 2014, the show moved to the channel Russia-K. It is also broadcast on Mult since 1 June 2014. It premiered during Good Night, Little Ones!.

In Ukraine the show airs on channels TET (2011–2016) (Russian original and without subtitles) and Novyi Kanal (2017–2022) (with Ukrainian dubbing).

In China the show airs on the channel CCTV Kids (2020—).

== Creators ==
In parentheses indicate the season number.

Scenario author - Darin Schmidt (1–7), Sarra Anson (Anna Sarantsevа, 1–5), Elena Galdobina (с 3), Fedor Dmitriev (со 2), Elena Pavlikova (1, с 7), Dmitry Yakovenko (1), Marina Bogdanova (1) Marina Komarkevich (1–2,4-5), Natalia Stepanova (1–2, 5,с 8), Alina Sokolova (1–2, 5, с 8), Andrew Chibis (1), Andrei Sazonov (1–4) Kirill Glezin (1), Olga Obraztsova (1, 3–5, 7), Tatiana Gorbushina (со 2), Victor Perel'man (2), Anna Sosnora (2,с 7), Tatiana Ionova (2), Alexander Bogdanov (2–5), Dmitry and Natalia Zakharovs (2), Aleksey Anoshkin (2–3), Tatiana Klein (3), Galina Voropay (3–4), Valeria Tumanova (3), Vladimir Bouriak (3), Pavel Vasilyev (3, 6), Elena Fedyahina (4), Vera Bekeleva (4–6), Konstantin Bronzit (4), Oleg Kim (5, с 7), Leonid Magergut (5–6), Marina May (5), Richat Gilmetdinov (5–6) Alexander Yaskina (5), Yevgeny Skukovsky (5–6), Evgeniya Golubeva (5–6), Svetlana Krupenko (6), Maria Domogatskaya (Montvid) (6–7), Julia Savchenko (6) Anastasia Chistjakova (6), Vladimir Haunin (6), Vadim Smolyak (с 7), Tatiana Manetina (с 7), Svetlana Sachenko (с 7), Ekaterina Maksymenko (с 7).

Head writer - Sarra Anson (1–5), Elena Galdobina (с 3)

Director - Darina Schmidt (1, 3–4, 6), Olga Obraztsova (1, 3–5, с 7), Lyudmila Steblyanko (1–6, с 8), Anton Rudin (1–4), Galina Voropay (1–4,с 7), Catherine Shraga (1–6), Elena Galdobina (2–7), Fedor Dmitriev (2–6), Ekaterina Salabay (с 3), Alexey Anoshkin (3), Olga Kazhanova (4, с 8), Richat Gilmetdinov (4), Anna Mironova (с 4), Mikhail Safronov (4), Alexey Pichuzhin (с 4), Evgenia Golubeva (5–6), Alexander Mal'gin (с 7), Tatiana Gorbushina ( с 7), Alexandra Kovtun (с 7), Lyudmila Klinova (с 7)

Art director - Marina Komarkevich (1–2), Darina Schmidt (1), Tatiana Klein (2–6), Irina Fedorova (5–6), Vita Tkacheva (7), Ekaterina Maksymenko (7), Konstantin Bronzit (unknown)

Composer - Maksim Koshevarov (1–6), Sergey Zykov (3–6), Sergey Kuzmin (5–6), Mikhail Chertishchev (с 7)

Sound Engineer - Maria Barinova (4–7), Ekaterina Vinogradova (4–7), Sergey Tarasov (с 7), Maksim Romasevich (1–4), Yevgeny Zhebchuk (4–7), Kirill Glezin (4–7), Vladimir Golounin (4–7).

Compositor and visualization editor - Maya Smorodina (1), Valeria Tarasova (2), Maksim Strogalev (3), Julia Kayugina (5), Alexandra Agrinskaya (7). Previously: Fedor Dmitriev (1), Elena Galdobina (1), Stanislav Pashkov (1), Elena Gorbunova (2), Irina Bravaya (3–5), Mikhail Litvinov (7), Maria Volokushina (7)

== Episodes ==
Note: Season one only

Season 1 (2006–2007)
No.	Episode title	Release date
1	I Was Born	1 September 2006
2	Dream	3 September 2006
3	The Perfect House	5 September 2006
4	How to Become a Friend	7 and 8 September 2006
5	What's in a Name	10 September 2006
6	Grandson	12 September 2006
7	Kind Deed	14 September 2006
8	Leech	15 and 16 September 2006
9	Dandelion	18 and 19 September 2006
10	Fireflies	21 September 2006
11	Box	25 September 2006
12	Mila	28 September 2006
13	What's in the Pond?	30 September 2006
14	Ball	3 October 2006
15	Up & Down	5 October 2006
16	Sock	9 October 2006
17	Bubbles	13 October 2006
18	Cane	15 October 2006
19	Pie	17 October 2006
20	Dew	19 October 2006
21	Blanket	21 October 2006
22	Toy	23 October 2006

== Films ==
Note: Films only

Films (2024–2026)
No.	Episode title	Release date
1	Moonzy: Homecoming	29 August 2024
2	Moonzy: The other side of the Moon	27 August 2026

== Film ==
A film adaptation based on the series called Moonzy: Homecoming was released on 29 August 2024.
