= Melnitsa Animation Studio =

Russian animation studio

- Industry: Animation; Motion pictures
- Founded: March 26, 1999; 27 years ago
- Headquarters: Saint Petersburg, Russia
- Key people: Aleksandr Boyarsky (CEO); Sergey Selyanov (chief producer); Konstantin Bronzit (art director)
- Products: Animated films
- Revenue: $1.57 million (2017)
- Operating income: $207,909 (2017)
- Net income: $84,501 (2017)
- Total assets: $12.9 million (2017)
- Total equity: $484,653 (2017)
- Number of employees: 325 (2014)
- Website: www.melnitsa.com

Melnitsa Animation Studio (Russian: Студия анимационного кино «Мельница», "melnitsa" meaning "windmill") is one of the largest animation studios in Russia. Deutsche Welle called the studio the Walt Disney of Saint Petersburg. Alongside its animation projects, Melnitsa has an effort devoted to creating digital special effects for both animation projects and live-action films.

== History ==
The studio traces its roots to several animated projects in the late 1990s, including television commercials, the short film Die Hard by Konstantin Bronzit (Grand Prix of the Annecy International Animated Film Festival, 1998), and the animated series "Global Bears Rescue" and "Technology", created for Poseidon Film Distributors Ltd.

In 1999, Melnitsa was formally established with backing from STV Film Company's Sergey Selyanov and led by Aleksandr Boyarsky. STV Film Company retains a 50% share of the studio. The newly formed studio's first project was Adventures in Oz (Приключения в Изумрудном Городе) for NTV-film (НТВ-кино), a four-part animation released in 2000.

In 2001, Melnitsa released its first 3D-animated project - the short film Good Morning (С добрым утром) by Denis Chernov. In 2002 Melnitsa released two short films by the famous animator and director Konstantin Bronzit: There Was an Old Lady for Scholastic Entertainment and the 3D-animated film The God.

In 2000, Melnitsa began work on the feature-length animated film Little Longnose (Карлик Нос) directed by Ilya Maksimov, based on the fairy tale of Wilhelm Hauff. The film premiered on March 20, 2003, reportedly becoming one of the first Russian animated feature film released to theatres in nearly 40 years.

On December 23, 2004, the feature film Alyosha Popovich and Tugarin Zmey (Алёша Попович и Тугарин Змей) was released, directed by Konstantin Bronzit. The film was completed on a $4 million budget, and took in about $1.7 million at the box office. This marked the beginning of Melnitsa's "The Three Bogatyrs" trilogy, and two more films were planned over the next several years.

In January 2005, at the 10th Open Russian Festival of Animated Film in Suzdal, the new short film by Konstantin Bronzit premiered, called Cat and Fox (Кот и Лиса). Bronzit's film, based on a national Russian tale, was part of the huge government-sponsored project by Moscow-based Pilot studio called "Gora Samotsvetov" (Гора самоцветов). The project, when complete, will consist of 52 13-minute films based on fairy tales from all of Russia's nationalities.

On March 15, 2006, the second film in the "3 Bogatyrs" trilogy was released, called Dobrynya Nikitich and Zmey Gorynych (Добрыня Никитич и Змей Горыныч), directed by Ilya Maksimov. It came on the heels of the animated blockbuster Prince Vladimir, which was released on February 22, 2006.

Luntik, an animated series launched in 2006, gathered a total of over 2 billion views on YouTube.

The third film in the trilogy, Ilya Muromets and Nightingale the Robber (Илья Муромец и Соловей Разбойник), was released on July 7, 2007, grossing $10 million on a $2 million budget and setting a record for Russia's domestic animation industry, later surpassed by the studio's Three Heroes on Distant Shores earning $26 million in 2012. The 2013 film Three Warriors On Far Shores again established a new record for Russian animation, grossing $31.5 million. The release of Krepost in 2015 led to some controversy in Poland, as it depicted a 17th-century battle between Russian and Polish armies.

The studio's 2007 short film Lavatory – Lovestory was nominated for the Academy Award for Best Animated Short Film, followed by a nomination for We Can't Live Without Cosmos in the same category during the 88th Academy Awards in 2016.

== Style ==
The studio places its primary emphasis not on high-art animation but on engaging storytelling. According to professional assessments [ambiguous phrasing], the quality of Melnitsa's productions is considered average. However, Alexander Gerasimov, CEO of Master-Film, views this as a strength of the studio, since its productions are profitable. Anatoly Prokhorov, co-owner of the company “Petersburg,” also noted that Melnitsa's work features "less-than-perfect scripts, directing, and inconsistent animation quality," and that the creators "work with relatively simple technological tools"—yet their content resonates with audiences and is well received.

== Filmography ==
=== Short film ===
Year	Production
2024	The Three Sisters
2019	Boxballet
2019	He Can't Live Without Cosmos
2014	We Can't Live Without Cosmos
2007	The Little Vasilisa
2007	Lavatory Lovestory
2003	The God

=== Full length ===
Year	Title cartoon	Director	Author(s) script	Production Designer	Budget	Box office
2003	Little Longnose; Карлик Нос	Ilya Maksimov	Aleksandr Boyarsky	Aleksandra Averianova	$2,5 million	$569 837
2004	Alyosha Popovich and Tugarin Zmey; Алёша Попович и Тугарин Змей	Konstantin Bronzit	Aleksandr Boyarsky; Maksim Sveshnikov; Ilya Maksimov; Konstantin Bronzit	Ol'ga Ovinnikova	$4 million	$1 730 000
2006	Dobrynya Nikitich and Zmey Gorynych; Добрыня Никитич и Змей Горыныч	Ilya Maksimov	Aleksandr Boyarsky; Maksim Sveshnikov; Ilya Maksimov	Ol'ga Ovinnikova	$4,5 million	$3 620 000
2007	Ilya Muromets and Nightingale the Robber; Илья Муромец и Соловей-Разбойник	Vladimir Toropchin	Aleksandr Boyarsky; Maksim Sveshnikov	Oleg Markelov	$2 million	$9 739 679
2008	The Tale of Soldier Fedot, The Daring Fellow ru:Про Федота-стрельца, удалого молодца	Lyudmila Steblyanko	Lyudmila Steblyanko; Roman Smorodin	Anastasia Vasil'eva	—	$2 586 097
2010	How Not to Rescue a Princess; Три богатыря и Шамаханская царица	Sergey Glezin	Aleksandr Boyarsky; Ol'ga Nikiforova	Elena Lavrent'eva; Oleg Markelov	$2,5 million	$19 010 585
2011	Ivan Tsarevich and the Gray Wolf; Иван Царевич и Серый Волк	Vladimir Toropchin	Aleksandr Boyarsky Rostislav Khait; Leonid Barats; Sergei Petreykov	Marina Kudryavtseva	$3 million	$24 830 497
2012	Three Heroes on Distant Shores; Три богатыря на дальних берегах	Konstantin Feoktistov	Aleksandr Boyarsky	Lidiya Savina	$3,5 million	$31 505 876
2013	Ivan Tsarevich and the Gray Wolf 2 ru:Иван Царевич и Серый волк 2	Vladimir Toropchin	Vladimir Toropchin; Aleksandr Boyarsky; Svetlana Sachenko	Svetlana Degtyarёva	—	$20 962 988
2015	Three heroes. Horse Course; Три богатыря. Ход конём	Konstantin Feoktistov	Aleksandr Boyarsky; Svetlana Sachenko	Svetlana Degtyarёva	$3,5 million	$19 390 136
2015	The Fortress; Крепость. Щитом и мечом	Fyodor Dmitriev	Aleksandr Boyarsky	Oleg Markelov	—	$1 176 906
2016	Ivan Tsarevich and the Gray Wolf 3 ru:Иван Царевич и Серый волк 3	Darina Schmidt	Rostislav Khait Leonid Barats Sergei Petreykov	Svetlana Degtyarёva	—	$10 271 463
2017	The Three Heroes and the Sea King; Три богатыря и морской царь	Konstantin Feoktistov	Aleksandr Boyarsky; Svetlana Sachenko; Alena Tabunova (idea)	Andrei Yakobchuk	$4	$14 134 274
2017	Fantastic Journey to OZ; Урфин Джюс и его деревянные солдаты	Vladimir Toropchin Fyodor Dmitriev Darina Schmidt	Aleksandr Boyarsky; Darina Schmidt	Anatolii Sokolov	—	$3 068 073
2017	Three Heroes and the Princess of Egypt; Три богатыря и принцесса Египта	Konstantin Feoktistov	Aleksandr Boyarsky; Svetlana Sachenko	Andrei Yakobchuk	$3.5 million	$12.6 million
2018	The Three Heroes. The Heiress to the Throne ru:Три богатыря и наследница престола	Konstantin Bronzit	Maksim Sveshnikov; Vadim Sveshnikov; Konstantin Bronzit	Yuliya Maslova Daria Ivanova	$2.5 million	—
2018	Sadko; Садко	Maksim Volkov Vitaly Mukhametzyanov	Alexander Arkhhipov; Dmitry Novoselov; Slava Se	Aleksei Motavin		
2019	Fantastic Return to Oz Урфин Джюс возвращается	Fyodor Dmitriev	Aleksandr Boyarsky	Aleksei Korobkin		
2019	Ivan Tsarevich and the Gray Wolf 4 ru:Иван Царевич и Серый волк 4	Darina Schmidt; Konstantin Feoktistov	Rostislav Khait; Leonid Barats; Sergei Petreykov	Daria Ivanova		
2020	The Barkers: Mind the Cats! Барбоскины на даче	Elena Galdobina Fyodor Dmitriev	Aleksandr Boyarsky Aleksandra Shokha	Oleg Markelov	$2 million	$951 075
2020	Horse Julius and the Big Races Конь Юлий и большие скачки	Darina Schmidt; Konstantin Feoktistov	Maksim Sveshnikov; Vadim Sveshnikov Aleksandr Boyarsky	Andrey Yakobchuk	$2.4 million	$4 875 202
2021	Three Heroes and Horse Julius on the throne ru:Три Богатыря и Конь на троне	Darina Schmidt; Konstantin Feoktistov	Aleksandr Boyarskiy; Aleksandra Shokha; Oleg Kozyrev (in Participation)	Daria Ivanova	$2 310 646	$7 056 441
2022	The Barkers Team ru:Барбоскины Team	Elena Gabdolina; Fyodor Dmitriev	Elena Gabdolina; Fyodor Dmitriev	Oleg Markelov		$1 610 193
2022	Ivan Tsarevich and The Gray Wolf 5 ru:Иван Царевич и Серый волк 5	Konstantin Feoktistov	Aleksandr Boyarskiy; Aleksandra Shokha; Ivan Filippov (in Participation)	Daria Ivanova		$7 296 600
2023	Three Heroes and the Navel of the Earth ru:Три Богатыря и Пуп Земли	Konstantin Biryukov; Konstantin Feoktistov	Aleksandr Boyarskiy; Aleksandra Shokha	Andrey Yakobchuk	$2 500 000	$11 321 217
2024	Moonzy: Homecoming ru:Лунтик. Возвращение домой	Konstantin Bronzit	Konstantin Bronzit; Darina Schmidt; Dmitriy Vysotskiy	Oleg Markelov		
2024	Ivan Tsarevich and The Gray Wolf 6 ru:Иван Царевич и Серый волк 6	Darina Schmidt; Konstantin Feoktistov	Aleksandr Boyarskiy; Aleksandra Shokha; Aleksandr Arkhipov (in Participation)	Daria Ivanova		
2025	Three Heroes and the Light is a Wedge ru:Три Богатыря и Свет Клином	Darina Schmidt; Konstantin Feoktistov (Animation Director)	Aleksandr Boyarskiy; Aleksandra Shokha	Andrei Yakobchuk		
2026	Luntik. The other side of the Moon ru:Лунтик. Обратная сторона Луны	Darina Schmidt	Darina Schmidt	Oleg Markelov		
2026	Three Heroes and the Swan-Geese; Три Богатыря и Гуси-Лебеди	Fyodor Dmitriev	Aleksandr Boyarskiy			

==== In Development ====
Year	Title cartoon	Director	Author(s) script	Production Designer
2027	Ivan Tsarevich and The Grey Wolf 7 Иван Царевич и Серый волк 7	Konstantin Feoktistov	Aleksandr Boyarskiy; Aleksandra Shokha	Yulia Maslova; Daria Ivanova

=== Serial cartoons ===
Year	Title cartoon	Directed by of the animated series	The main authors of the script	Production Designer	Number of seasons	Number of series
1999—2000	Adventures in the Emerald City Приключения в Изумрудном городе	Aleksandr Makarov (1-2) Ilya Maksimov (3) Denis Chernov (4)	Evgeny Markov (1-2) Mikhail Bartenev (3-4) Andrei Usachyov (3-4)	Yuriy Solovyov (1-2) Ilya Myshkin (3-4)	1 season	4
2006—present	Luntik and his friends (Moonzy); Приключения Лунтика и его друзей (Лунтик)	Darina Shmidt Elena Galdobina	Darina Shmidt; Fyodor Dmitriev; Elena Galdobina; Mariya Domogatskaya; Anna Sosnora; Alexandr Mal'gin; Svetlana Sachenko; Tatiana Gorbushina	Marina Komarkevich (1–2 seasons); Tatiana Klein (2–6 seasons); Irina Fёdorova (5–6 seasons); Vita Tkachёva (7 seasons: series 2012); Ekaterina Maksimenko (from 7 season)	10	572
2011—present	The Barkers (The Poochers) Барбоскины	Elena Galdobina Ekaterina Salabay	Elena Galdobina Fyodor Dmitriev Konstantin Feoktistov Vadim Smolyak Anna Sosnora	Lyudmila Steblyanko (1-100) Alesya Barsukova (91-130) Marina Makarova (from 131) Aleksey Korobkin Eduard Yankovsky	17 seasons	286
2018—present	Little Tiaras; Царевны	Konstantin Bronzit; Elena Galdobina; Darina Schmidt	Darina Schmidt; Fyodor Dmitriev; Aleksandr Sinitsyn	Andrei Yakobchuk	3	78
2024-present	Three Heroes. Not a Day Without a Featru:Три богатыря. Ни дня без подвига	Aleksandra Shokha; Yekaterina Salabay	Sergey Sel'yanov; Aleksandr Boyarskiy	3	9	

== See also ==
- History of Russian animation
- List of animated feature films
