= The Fortress: By Shield and Sword =

2015 Russian adventure film

- Directed by: Fyodor Dmitriev
- Written by: Aleksandr Boyarsky
- Based on: Historical events
- Produced by: Sergey Selyanov; Aleksandr Boyarsky; Sasha Shapiro
- Starring: Voice cast
- Animation by: Maria Aluferova; Ekaterina Kolmakova; Evgenia Grishina; Vera Shiganova; Darya Skripka
- Production companies: Melnitsa; STV
- Distributed by: Nashe Kino (Russia)
- Release date: 29 October 2015 (Russia)
- Running time: 73 minutes
- Country: Russia
- Language: Russian
- Budget: $3.8 million
- Box office: $1.2 million; 76.6 million RUB

The Fortress: By Shield and Sword (Russian: Крепость. Щитом и мечом, translit. Krepost': Shchitom I Mechom) is a Russian full-length war-historical animated feature produced by Melnitsa and STV, based on the story of the Siege of Smolensk. The film was directed by Fyodor Dmitriev, with the screenplay written by Aleksandr Boyarsky in 2005. The film premiered on October 29, 2015.

== Plot ==
In the year 1609, the army of the Polish–Lithuanian Commonwealth, led by King Sigismund III and Hetman Stanisław Żółkiewski, sets up camp near Smolensk. The king expects to take the city within days and then march on Moscow. At night, two boys—Sashka, an orphan, and Fyodor, a priest’s son—discover the Polish camp while helping the local baker Filimon.

That day, Sashka is whipped by Filimon for causing an explosion in the bakery with a dough-made "bomb." After the punishment, he tells Fyodor about the "Fiery Shield Tsar," a mythical figure said to have appeared in Moscow as a harbinger of doom. He convinces Fyodor to sneak out to the cemetery at night. There, Sashka stages a dance to scare his friend but falls into a sunken grave. The frightened boys flee and stumble upon the Polish camp.

Sashka decides to throw a dough bomb into the camp to delay the enemy and sends Fyodor to warn the city. The bomb only singes a soldier’s pants, and Sashka is spotted. He runs toward the fortress, where he sees the city preparing for defense. He meets the voivode, Mikhail Shein.

The next morning, Shein lines up the townspeople to assess their readiness for battle. Sashka disguises himself with fake mustaches, hoping to be enlisted, but is ignored. However, Fyodor is found to be literate and is assigned as a scribe to the clerk Alexei Ivanovich.

Sashka tries again to prove his worth by making more dough bombs. At night, with Fyodor’s help, he sneaks into Filimon’s bakery through the chimney. Covered in soot, he startles the baker, grabs some dough, and escapes through the window.

Later, Sashka and Fyodor part ways at a well. Sashka sneaks into the Avraamievsky Gate and steals a pouch of gunpowder. He notices a rope in an embrasure and sees a masked spy climbing up. Sashka pulls the rope, but the spy cuts it. A guard catches Sashka and accuses him of theft, but the boy escapes, scolding the guard for missing the spy. At the top of the tower, Sashka finds a silver cross on the rope.

The next morning, he shows the cross to Fyodor, who says it belongs to "a good man" who asked him to find it. Suddenly, the Poles begin shelling the city. A cannonball crashes through the chimney, nearly hitting Sashka. When he returns to the window, Fyodor is gone—killed by the spy hiding behind a cabinet, who also takes the cross.

Sashka runs through the bombardment to help Shein with a cannon. Meanwhile, Polish troops approach the Avraamievsky Gate with a battering ram. Shein devises a ruse: place a bag of gunpowder at the gate and sound a Polish signal with a horn to lure enemy cavalry into a trap, where they can be ambushed by cannon fire.

The cavalry falls for the ruse and charges forward, only to crash into the closed gates. At that moment, Shein orders the cannons to fire, but they fail to shoot— the gunpowder has been diluted with sand, and the Polish troops retreat safely to their camp. The voivode summons the night watchman. Upon seeing Sashka, the guard immediately accuses him of stealing gunpowder during the night. Shein orders Sashka to be locked in the old bathhouse. That night, a Polish spy sneaks into the bathhouse to kill Sashka, but leaves empty-handed—Sashka was hidden just in time by an old man living there, whom the boy initially mistakes for a Bannik (bathhouse spirit).

After the failed assault, King Sigismund III scolds Stanisław Żółkiewski for the unsuccessful attack on the Avraamievsky Gate. The hetman reports that in a week, weapons capable of breaching Smolensk’s walls will arrive from Riga. Meanwhile, the cardinal—Sigismund’s uncle—advises the king to deprive the Russians of cannonballs and reveals that there are many underground tunnels beneath Smolensk. In the catacombs, the cardinal meets with a spy, instructs him to sabotage the foundry, and gives him a devil mask to spread rumors of evil forces in the city, hoping to incite panic and disorder. The spy infiltrates the foundry, releases water, and washes away all the fireproof clay, frightening one of the workers with the devil mask.

Back in the bathhouse, the old man shows Sashka a passage to the underground and asks him to bring special clay from there for the stove. Sashka fulfills the task, but upon returning, finds the old man gone and heads back into the catacombs. Soldier Nikolai informs Shein that eight sacks of gunpowder—each weighing three poods—had been tampered with, meaning Sashka couldn’t have done it. Shein visits the bathhouse and discovers molding clay essential for cannonball production. He orders it to be delivered to the foundry.

Sashka escapes the catacombs through an old well. Filimon chases him, and the boy returns underground through the same well, which is then sealed with stones. Sashka makes his way back to the old man in the bathhouse, who puts him to sleep.

Believing Smolensk has run out of cannonballs, the Polish army launches a full-scale assault. The voivode and his troops repel the enemy.

At night, the old man wakes Sashka and sends him into the underground tunnels. In the catacombs, the boy notices a burning fuse and follows it to a stash of gunpowder barrels. Unable to extinguish the fuse, he pushes one of the barrels toward the entrance, where it explodes—saving one of the fortress towers.

Sashka visits the clerk Alexei Ivanovich to look for Fyodor. Seeing a silver cross around the clerk’s neck, he realizes the man is the spy. When asked about Fyodor, the clerk replies, “He’s gone and won’t return,” and tries to kill Sashka. The boy escapes, grabbing a devil mask that falls from the clerk’s bag. The voivode orders the traitor to be captured, but the clerk manages to flee the city. Sashka mourns Fyodor.

A massive cannon arrives from Riga at the enemy camp. With a single shot, the Poles breach the fortress wall. Soon after, envoys from Moscow arrive in Smolensk and announce the abdication of Tsar Vasili IV of Russia and an order from the interim government, the Seven Boyars, to surrender the city to Sigismund. Shein addresses the people, warning that the Polish king will not be satisfied with just Smolensk. The townspeople respond that they are ready to follow the voivode anywhere.

Shein refuses to surrender. The Polish cannon continues to destroy the fortress walls, constantly changing position. Without a scout’s signal, it is nearly impossible to target and destroy the cannon. Shein sends Nikolai to mark the cannon’s location and gives Sashka a letter to deliver to Moscow. Sashka returns to the old man to say goodbye. The man gives him a bundle for the journey. As Sashka runs into the street, it begins to rain. He slips and drops the letter, discovering it is a blank charter sheet—the voivode, believing the city doomed, wanted to save the boy.

In the bushes, Sashka finds wounded Nikolai with an unlit torch. Nikolai points out where the cannon was moved and gives Sashka the torch to signal its location. The torch is too wet to light. Sashka opens the bundle from the old man and finds a glass lantern with a candle inside. He lights it, revealing the cannon’s position. Russian artillery fires accurately and destroys the “miracle cannon.” As the traitorous clerk chases Sashka, the boy loses consciousness.

He has a vision: the clerk transforms into a giant Black Rider, bringing death to Smolensk. But from the lantern, the “Fiery Shield Tsar” appears in the sky, battles the Black Rider, and pierces his heart with a golden spear. The Fiery Shield Tsar lifts Sashka in his palm and removes his helmet. The boy sees the old man from the bathhouse who had helped him. Sashka finds himself in the afterlife, which appears as the same old bathhouse, where he reunites with Fyodor. They embrace and say goodbye.

In the finale, it is revealed that the defiant fortress fell two years later. Eight years after that, in 1619, voivode Shein returns from Polish captivity. At the Russo-Polish border post during a prisoner exchange, Shein recognizes one of the soldiers greeting him—it is a grown-up Sashka.

== Voice cast ==
Actor	Role(s)
Elena Shulman	Sashka
Pyotr Fyodorov	Voivode Mikhail Shein
Ekaterina Gorokhovskaya	Fyodor
Vadim Nikitin	The Old Man
Yevgeny Stychkin	Polish King Sigismund III
Oleg Kulikovich	Clerk Alexei Ivanovich / Boyars from Moscow
Sergey Russkin	Cardinal
Anatoly Petrov	Polish Hetman Stanisław Żółkiewski / Foundry Worker
Aleksandr Boyarsky	Baker Filimon / Old Man in Crowd / Foundry Worker (first line)
Mikhail Khrustalyov	Soldier Nikolai / Narrator at the end
Yakov Petrov	Soldiers and Commanders / Watchman
Maksim Sergeyev	Soldier who noticed the gunpowder was diluted with sand
Alexander Demich and Andrey Kuznetsov	Minor characters

== Soundtrack ==
- "Black Rider" (Russian: «Чёрный всадник») "Black Rider" — official music video (YouTube)
1. Music by Mikhail Chertishchev, K. Chentsov
2. Lyrics by Aleksandr Boyarsky
3. Performed by Alisa Kozhikina
- "Freedom" (Russian: «Свобода») "Freedom" — official music video (YouTube)
1. Music by Semyon Treskunov, Sergey Pokhodayev, Mikhail Chertishchev
2. Lyrics by Semyon Treskunov, Sergey Pokhodayev
3. Performed by Semyon Treskunov, Alisa Kozhikina

== Reception ==
=== Russia ===
Elena Didenko, writing for sakhalin.info, praised the film as a vibrant and patriotic work that is playful yet serious, without unnecessary cruelty. According to Didenko, this combination is likely to engage young viewers, especially since the main character is a child, making it easy for audiences to empathize. She also commended the film for its historical accuracy and detailed depiction of artillery, as well as Russian and Polish military uniforms. However, Didenko criticized the overly "cartoonish" appearance of some characters, which somewhat conflicted with the high-quality animation and the "serious plot."

Film critic Boris Ivanov, writing for Film.ru, praised the film's historical approach, noting that the Battle of Smolensk did not result in a Russian victory and is therefore often overlooked, yet it significantly influenced the course of the war in Russia's favor. On the other hand, he felt the plot was somewhat disjointed and contained historical inconsistencies. Ivanov was also dissatisfied with the appearance of certain deus ex machina elements, arguing that the main characters should have driven the narrative. He noted that many plot weaknesses stem from the film's uniqueness, but the experience could benefit future creators aiming for similar projects. He also highlighted that Polish characters were portrayed respectfully, without clichéd villainy. Ivanov concluded: "Yes, it is a bit clumsy. But above all, it is a unique, engaging, dramatic, beautifully animated, and heartfelt patriotic film for contemporary Russia. It honors our heroes, does not demean foreign enemies, and tells its mature story in a way that is understandable and relatable to children."

=== Belarus ===
A review on the Belarusian site Belarusians and the Market mentioned dissatisfaction among some Belarusians that the film completely omits the forces of the Grand Duchy of Lithuania, which alongside Polish troops participated in the Siege of Smolensk.

=== Poland ===
The film attracted attention in the Polish media, which described it as controversial and anti-Polish, criticizing the depiction of King Sigismund III. The Polish site Onet claimed the film was produced by the Russian government as part of an information war against the West and Poland.

Andrzej Poczobut of Gazeta Wyborcza described the film as "about evil Poles" and noted its controversial reception in Belarus.

Kamil Sikora criticized the film, pointing out that "even children fight with Poles," and argued that the film would reinforce a negative image of Poland in Russia.

A review in the cultural magazine Esensja noted that despite the overt pro-Russian propaganda, the film captivates with its vivid story, mystical elements, emotionally charged ending, quality animation, and a sympathetic main character. The reviewer also mentioned that the narrative does not divide reality into black and white: it includes neutral Polish characters as well as negative Russian ones, though historical facts are distorted to portray Poland negatively and Russia romantically.

=== United Kingdom ===
Olga Sherwood of the BBC Russian Service described the film's ending as a "miracle" that elevated the work above the unpopular Unity Day holiday, the officially promoted new "Orthodoxy, autocracy, nationality," and the formalistic moralizing about raising children through examples of military valor in a patriotic spirit.

== Awards ==
- 2016 — 20th All-Russian Festival of Visual Arts at the children's center "Orlyonok": Best Feature-Length Animated Work — The Fortress: By Shield and Sword, directed by Fyodor Dmitriev
- 2016 — 13th International Charitable Film Festival "Radiant Angel Film Festival" (Russian: Лучезарный ангел) in the "Animated Film" category: Third Prize — The Fortress: By Shield and Sword, directed by Fyodor Dmitriev

== See also ==
- Siege of Smolensk (1609–1611)
