= Boxballet =

- Directed by: Anton Dyakov
- Written by: Anton Dyakov; Andrey Vasilyev
- Produced by: Aleksandr Boyarskiy; Sergey Selyanov
- Production companies: CTB; Melnitsa Animation Studio
- Release date: June 14, 2021 (Annecy International Animation Film Festival)
- Running time: 15 minutes
- Country: Russia

Boxballet (Russian: БоксБалет, romanized: BoksBalet) is a 2021 Russian animated film directed by Anton Dyakov.. The short film is about a boxer named Evgeny and a ballerina named Olya falling in love, but are kept apart by dilemmas that occur behind the scenes of their respective professions.

== Summary ==
Wearing nothing but her tutu and ballet shoes, a ballerina named Olya rushes out of the ballet studio and takes the train. Meanwhile, a boxer named Evgeny gets ready for his match with Radul Zaboev. As Evgeny looks in the mirror, he remembers how he met Olya.

To get to his training gym, Evgeny drives his car and takes the train. One day, Evgeny sees Olya for the first time, but doesn't get to talk to her as she exits the train before the boxer's destination.

At the ballet studio, Olya and her fellow dancers practice under the eye of their ballet master. The ballet master has been lusting after Olya while the other ballerinas turn a blind eye.

That night, Evgeny is on his way home from shopping when he meets Olya again as she tries to get her pet cat out of a tree; taking pity on Olya, Evgeny climbs the tree and gets her cat, but he accidentally slips to the ground and gets his face scratched by the startled feline. Olya apologises by tending to Evgeny's wounds and giving him tea at her flat.

As days pass by, Evgeny and Olya become friends, before eventually going out on dates and telling each other stories of their lives and jobs, but keep their dilemmas a secret. One night, Evgeny encounters the ballet master as the boxer shows up to watch Olya perform as a swan maiden in Swan Lake. When the show is over, the ballet master takes Olya to a restaurant and Evgeny, clutching a bouquet of flowers, misses her.

At the restaurant, the ballet master offers Olya the chance to star as Giselle in exchange for sleeping with him, a bargain she reluctantly agrees to. When Evgeny knocks on Olya's flat door the next day, she doesn't respond out of shame and the boxer leaves heartbroken to prepare for his match with Radul Zaboev.

On the day of the boxing match, Olya practices for the role of Giselle but instead decides to quit and punches the ballet master in the face. Olya then flees the ballet studio to take the train to the arena. In the locker room, Evgeny's coach is revealed to have been doping the boxer and putting lug nuts under Evgeny's hand wraps before every fight; not wanting to cheat out of his love for Olya, Evgeny has the lug nuts removed and stops taking the drugs.

The fight is a disaster for Evgeny as Zaboev beats him up easily. As Zaboev pummels him over and over, Evgeny looks up to see Olya and is comforted knowing she still loves him.

Some time later, Evgeny and Olya have quit their jobs and now live together in a lakeside cabin. On December 26, 1991, the two lovers know they have their full lives ahead of them as they watch the dissolution of the Soviet Union.

== Accolades ==
Year	Ceremony	Award/Category	Status
2021	Russian Guild of Film Critics Awards	Best Animated Film	Nominated
2022	94th Academy Awards	Best Animated Short Film	Nominated
