= The Three Sisters (2024 film) =

- Directed by: Konstantin Bronzit
- Written by: Konstantin Bronzit
- Production companies: Melnitsa Animation Studio; Polydont Films
- Release date: 2024
- Running time: 14 minutes
- Countries: Israel; Cyprus; Russia

The Three Sisters (Russian: Три сестры) is a 2024 animated short film by Konstantin Bronzit. It was nominated for an Academy Award for Best Animated Short Film in 2026.

== Summary ==
The film follows three sisters who live in three houses on a dome-shaped island. When misfortune befalls them and they need an additional income, two of them move in together and rent out the empty house, which is then occupied by a sailor. At first, they are repelled by him, but soon they are vying for his attention.

== Production ==
The concept for the film originated with Dmitri Vysotsky, an animation artist and friend of Bronzit's, who told him about his idea on the flight home from the 2016 Academy Awards. The film tells the story of three sisters living a quiet and peaceful life until a man appears and disrupts it. Bronzit was enthusiastic about the idea but initially lacked the inspiration to realize the project. The concept for the film was developed starting in 2018, and it was released in 2024.

Bronzit deliberately used a pseudonym and constructed a fictionalized identity for the director as part of what he described as a "test" of the film festival and awards selection system. His goal was to determine whether a film could succeed based purely on its artistic merit, without the influence of name recognition, reputation, or industry bias.

== Release ==
The film was submitted to festivals worldwide under the false identity, complete with a fabricated biography and partial real-life details. Despite being rejected by many festivals, The Three Sisters was accepted by around two dozen and won several awards, including audience prizes. When submitting to the Academy Awards, Bronzit used his real name, as Oscar screening procedures anonymize films during initial viewing.
