= Prince Vladimir (film) =

- Release poster
- Directed by: Yuri Kulakov
- Written by: Andrey Dobrunov; Yuri Batanin; Yuri Kulakov
- Based on: Life of Vladimir the Great
- Produced by: Andrey Dobrunov
- Starring: Yuri Berkun; Irina Bezrukova; Sergei Bezrukov; Lisa Martirosova; Vladimir Gostyukhin
- Cinematography: Mariya Erohina
- Edited by: Sergei Minakin
- Music by: Sergey Starostin; Ighor Zhuravlev (songs); Alexander Pinegin (songs); Andrei Usachev (songs)
- Distributed by: CASCADE-FILM (in CIS and Baltic countries)
- Release date: February 23, 2006
- Running time: 78 minutes
- Country: Russia
- Language: Russian

Prince Vladimir (Russian: Кня́зь Влади́мир, Knyaz' Vladimir) is a 2006 Russian traditionally-animated feature film. It is loosely based on the story of prince Vladimir the Great, who converted Kievan Rus' to Christianity in the late 10th century. The film tells a romanticized version of the story, adapted for children and filled with fantasy elements.

== Plot ==
The plot follows the events surrounding Vladimir from childhood and into adulthood.

In the beginning of the film, there were three pagan princes who ruled ancient Rus': Vladimir of Novgorod, Oleg of Drelinia, and Yaropolk, under the guidance of the wise volkhvy priests. The land was peaceful until a power-hungry student of one of the volkhvy killed his master, who cursed him and gave him the name "Krivzha" (meaning "crooked"). As a high priest and in his quest for dominance, he conspires with the Pecheneg khan Kurya to pillage Slavic villages to undermine the authority of the Slavic princes. Krivzha also influences Prince Vladimir to become a cruel ruler. Vladimir attempts to kill his brother Yaropolk, accusing him of killing Oleg.

Regretting the murder of his brother Yaropolk by his uncle Dobrynya, Vladimir does not suspect a conspiracy between the priest and the Pechenegs. Vladimir is concerned about gathering the Slavic tribes into one united state. Solving this major task, he faces obstacles, which Vladimir overcomes in the end, defeating Krivzha and winning the battle against Kurya.

== Characters ==
- Prince Vladimir - Grandson of the legendary princess Olga and son of great warlord Svyatoslav.
- Krivzha - A priest and wizard who pontificates on behalf of Perun, Prince Vladimir's prime martial god, but in fact just skillfully shelters himself behind this to gain absolute power. He was cursed for killing his master, and he dislikes anything that is foreign. There were rumors that mention that he did bad things while in the guise of a bear, but those who saw him in this guise had gone missing.
- Alexei (Aleksha) - An inquisitive and clever boy. Having lost his parents, he has been fostered by his grandfather. After his grandfather was killed, he was taken as a slave to a Pecheneg messenger, before he was purchased and brought to the Emperor at Constantinople by the rich noble Anastasius, who baptizes him as a Christian. He later returned to Rus', and escapes being captured by Krivzha's men.
- Kurya - The chief of the Pechenegs. Used to be at enmity with Prince Svyatoslav, Vladimir's father. Since then, he has been a cruel and imperious leader of half-wild steppe tribe, planning and doing everything to invade Russian lands and harry Kiev.
- Boyan - A kind and honorable old man. Contrary to Krivzha, he is a friendly pagan priest, the "wood grandsire"; he is a part of the nature, he talks with living trees and worships them. His staff is a home for bees, which tell him about all the news of the wood. Boyan is a personification of ancient Slavic wisdom, open-mindedness and patience.
- Dobrynya - A waywode, Prince Vladimir's uncle and tutor. Harsh and straightforward. A warrior of tremendous power, sophisticated, whole-hearted in his devotion to the young Prince. The leader of the Slavic troops.
- Olaf the Red-haired - A brave and cruel waywode. Used to be a waywode of Norwegian sea-king Harald the Blue Teeth's troops. Disagreed about carving-up the spoils of war, left the sea-king and now swears to serve young Prince Vladimir.
- Hoten and Kostyanin - Brothers, Boyan's sons. Both are giants. Always together, and always searching for places where they can boast of their bravery.
- Olga - Waywode Dobrynya's daughter. Grew up without a mother, a playful and lively girl.
- Giyar - A son of the Pecheneg chief Kurya. A petty proudling, he was Alexei's everlasting rival.
- Anastasius - An adviser of the Byzantine Emperor. He purchased Alexei from his former master and converted him to Christianity.
- Byzantine Emperor - A wise politician, who sees in Russia not a rival or enemy but a possible ally, a defendant of orthodox Christians from eastern barbarians.
- Anna - A Byzantine Empress and beauty. A sister of Byzantine emperors Basil II and Constantine VIII. Clever and proud-hearted.
- Yaropolk - Vladimir's elder brother and by the will of Heaven – an obstacle on his way to the power.

== Background ==
Production started in 1997 with research into the customs of the time period as well as character design. Originally, the story was to be told through a series of 30-minute shorts, but the idea was scrapped. The first proposal presentation of Prince Vladimir took place on April 17, 2000, at the Russian Cultural Fund. Soon after, work began in earnest, and about 120 animators were employed on the film. At the 2002 Annecy International Animated Film Festival, Prince Vladimir was named one of the world's 12 most anticipated upcoming animated films. The first official presentation of the finished film took place on February 3, 2006 in Moscow. On February 7, 2006, another presentation for the press took place.

A sequel, Prince Vladimir - The Feat (Князь Владимир. Подвиг) was scheduled for release in 2008, but it was never released.

== Reception ==
Many in the public thought that the film was part of the light-hearted "Three Bogatyrs" trilogy by Melnitsa Animation Studio (the second film in the trilogy, Dobrynya Nikitich and Zmey Gorynych, was due for release on March 16), and were surprised and dismayed at the film's serious tone. Critical reaction was mixed. Critics praised the film's art and animation but criticized it for its inaccurate portrayal of the historical period and for perceived ideological pandering to its main sponsor, the Russian Orthodox Church.

It is the highest-grossing Russian animated film of all time, taking in $5.8 million since its release, and is the third highest-grossing animated film within Russia (behind Madagascar and Flushed Away). It cost $5 million to make, therefore the film is thought to have either lost money or narrowly broken even.

== Voice cast ==
Actor	Role(s)
Sergei Bezrukov	Prince Vladimir
Alexander Barinov	Krivzha
Lev Durov	Boyan
Igor Yasulovich	Volkhv
Vladimir Gostyukhin	Olaf the Red-Haired
Dmitry Nazarov	Dobrynya
Yuri Berkun	Kurya
Thomas Schlecker	Alexei
Lisa Martirosova	Olga
Kolya Rastorguev	Prince Giyar
Alexei Kolgan	Kosnyatin and Khotyon
Vladimir Antonik	The Byzantine Emperor
Irina Bezrukova	Queen Anna
Alexander Ryzhkov	The Adviser
Vasiliy Dakhnenko	Anastasiy
Anatoliy Beliy	Prince Yaropolk
Anna Kamenkova	Princess Olga
Alexander Pinegin	Alexei's grandfather
Vladimir Vikhrov	Narrator

== See also ==
- History of Russian animation
- List of animated feature films
- List of historical drama films
