= Aleksandr Boyarsky =

Producer and writer

- Александр Боярский
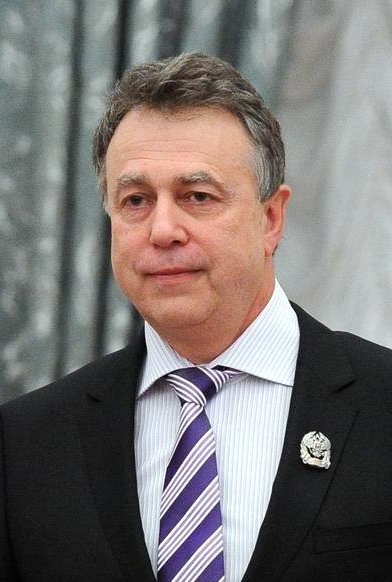
- Born: Aleksandr Ionovich Boyarsky; September 28, 1957 (age 68); Šiauliai, Lithuanian SSR, Soviet Union
- Citizenship: Soviet Union (until 1991); Russia
- Occupations: Film producer; screenwriter; voice actor; composer; sound operator; singer; musician; guitarist; songwriter
- Years active: 1991–present
- Known for: CEO of the Melnitsa Animation Studio

Aleksandr Ionovich Boyarsky (Russian: Алекса́ндр Ио́нович Боя́рский) is the CEO of the Melnitsa Animation Studio, producer, screenwriter, voice actor, and composer.

== Biography ==
Aleksandr Boyarsky was born in Šiauliai. He graduated from the Leningrad Institute of Film Engineers in 1987. In 1992, he founded a small recording studio "Midi-Cinema" together with composer Valentin Vasenkov.

Since 1999, he is the chief executive officer of the Melnitsa Animation Studio.

He is the author of the idea for the animated series "Luntik".

On February 28, 2015, he was presented to the Government awards in the field of culture for 2014. He was awarded the prize together with the directors Darina Schmidt and Elena Galdobina, and screenwriter Anna Sarantseva for he creation of an animated series for children "Luntik".

On April 8, 2016, he participated in the second ceremony of the Ikar National Animation Award that took place at the ZIL Cultural Center. The prize in the nomination "Film in cinematography" was awarded to the film Ivan Tsarevich and the Gray Wolf 3 (director Darina Schmidt, producers Aleksandr Boyarsky, Sergey Selyanov).

== Awards ==
- The main prize of the Annecy International Animation Film Festival (France, 1998).
- 2015 – Prize of the President of the Russian Federation in the field of literature and art for works for children and youth of 2015 – for contributing to the development of Russian animation cinema.
- 2017 – Ikar National Animation Award in the nominations "Producer" and "For stable success in the Russian film distribution".

== Filmography ==
=== Producer ===
- Die Hard (1996)
- Little Longnose (2003)
- Deity (2003)
- Alyosha Popovich and Tugarin Zmey (2004)
- Dobrinya and the Dragon (2005)
- Luntik (2006–present)
- Lavatory – Lovestory (2006)
- Ilya Muromets and Nightingale the Robber (2007)
- The Tale of Soldier Fedot, The Daring Fellow (2008)
- How Not to Rescue a Princess (2010)
- Ivan Tsarevich and the Gray Wolf (2011)
- The Barkers (2011–present)
- Three Heroes on the Distant Shores (2012)
- Ivan Tsarevich and the Gray Wolf 2 (2013)
- We Can't Live Without Cosmos (2014)
- Three Heroes. Horse Course (2014)
- The Fortress: By Shield and Sword (2015)
- Ivan Tsarevich and the Gray Wolf 3 (2015)
- Three Heroes and the Sea King (2016)
- Fantastic Journey to Oz (2017)
- Three Heroes and the Princess of Egypt (2017)
- Little Tiaras (2018–present)
- Three Heroes. The Heiress to the Throne (2018)
- He Can't Live Without Cosmos (2019)
- Fantastic Return to Oz (2019)
- Ivan Tsarevich and the Gray Wolf 4 (2019)
- The Barkers: Mind the Cats! (2020)
- Horse Julius and Big Horse Racing (2020)
- Three Heroes and a Horse on the Throne (2021)
- The Barkers Team (2022)
- Ivan Tsarevich and the Gray Wolf 5 (2022)

=== Executive producer ===
- Adventures in the Emerald City (1999–2000)
- The Cat and the Fox (2004)

=== Screenwriter ===
- Little Longnose (2003)
- Alyosha Popovich and Tugarin Zmey (2004)
- Dobrinya and the Dragon (2005)
- Ilya Muromets and Nightingale the Robber (2007)
- How Not to Rescue a Princess (2010)
- Baikino Village (2010)
- Sym-Bionic Titan (2010)
- Ivan Tsarevich and the Gray Wolf (2011)
- Three Heroes on the Distant Shores (2012)
- Ivan Tsarevich and the Gray Wolf 2 (2013)
- Three Heroes. Horse Course (2014)
- The Fortress. With Shield and Sword (2015)
- Three Heroes and the Sea King (2016)
- Fantastic Journey to Oz (2017)
- Three Heroes and the Princess of Egypt (2017)
- Little Tiaras (2018–present)
- Fantastic Return to Oz (2019)
- The Barkers: Mind the Cats! (2020)
- Horse Julius and Big Horse Racing (2020)
- Three Heroes and a Horse on the Throne (2021)
- Ivan Tsarevich and the Gray Wolf 5 (2022)

=== Composer ===
- Midnight Games (1991)
- Three Heroes and the Princess of Egypt (2017)
- Fantastic Return to Oz (2019)
- Ivan Tsarevich and the Gray Wolf 4 (2019)
- The Barkers: Mind the Cats! (2020)
- Horse Julius and Big Horse Racing (2020)
- Three Heroes and a Horse on the Throne (2021)
- Ivan Tsarevich and the Gray Wolf 5 (2022)

=== Sound director ===
- Switchcraft (1994)
- Die Hard (1996)
- Adventures in the Emerald City (1999–2000)
- The Cat and the Fox (2004)

=== Director ===
- Baikino Village (2010)

=== Voice acting ===
- Luntik (2006–present)
- Ilya Muromets and Nightingale the Robber (2007) — one-eyed robber (voice)
- Ivan Tsarevich and the Gray Wolf (2011) — The Spirit (Shadow) (voice)
- Three Heroes on the Distant Shores (2012) — princely clerk (voice)
- Ivan Tsarevich and the Gray Wolf 2 (2013) — Grey Wolf (voice)
- How to Catch a Firebird Feather (2013) — episodes (voice)
- Three Heroes. Horse Course (2014) — boyar Antip (voice)
- The Fortress. With Shield and Sword (2015) — baker Philemon (voice)
- Ivan Tsarevich and the Gray Wolf 3 (2015) — Grey Wolf (voice)
- Three Heroes and the Sea King (2016) — Kikimora (voice)
- Fantastic Journey to Oz (2017) — Ogre (voice)
- Three Heroes and the Princess of Egypt (2017) — Nefertiti's Father, episodes (voice)
- Little Tiaras (2018–present) — Guardian oak (voice)
- Three Heroes. The Heiress to the Throne (2018) — Emperor Basileus (voice)
- Fantastic Return to Oz (2019) — Ogre, Sabretooth Tigers, chief of the Karachi tribe (voice)
- Ivan Tsarevich and the Gray Wolf 4 (2019) — Grey Wolf, episodes (voice)
- Three Heroes and a Horse on the Throne (2021) — The Thin (voice)
