= Yelena Shulman =

Ukrainian voice actress

- Елена Шульман
- Shulman in the recording studio
- Born: Yelena Anatolyevna Tyoplaya; April 10, 1969; Odesa, Ukrainian SSR, USSR
- Died: April 9, 2023 (aged 53); Saint-Petersburg, Russia
- Resting place: Chernivtsi, Ukraine
- Other name: Yelena Tyoplaya
- Citizenship: Russian; Ukrainian
- Education: Russian Institute of Theatre Arts
- Occupation: Actress
- Years active: 1995–2023
- Works: List
- Children: Georgiy; Pyotr

Yelena Anatolyevna Shulman (Ukrainian: Олена Анатоліївна Шульман; née Tyoplaya, Russian: Теплая; April 10, 1969 – April 9, 2023) was a Russian and Ukrainian film and voice actress and announcer.

== Early life ==
She was born on April 10, 1969 in Odesa. According to STMEGI, she had Jewish roots.

She entered and graduated from the Russian Institute of Theatre Arts.

Yelena's mother was a designer of children's clothing, and her father, Anatoliy Tyoply, was a sailor. He sailed on ships for ten years, after which he returned to his family and they moved to the Caucasus. There, Yelena's father became a builder.

From early childhood, Yelena began to show the ability to imitate various sounds. Her voice and musical ear became a serious reason to think about a creative profession. Yelena first encountered a microphone in her school years, when she became a presenter on the school radio. After finishing school, she went to the Academy of Theatre Arts.

== Career ==
From 2012 to 2023, she worked mainly in Moscow.

=== Voice work ===
For over 20 years, Shulman was engaged in dubbing and voice-over work for foreign films and TV series. She collaborated with Moscow, St. Petersburg and Vinnytsia dubbing studios. She dubbed roles by Julia Roberts, Catherine Zeta-Jones, Lucy Lawless, Zoe Saldaña, Lana Parrilla, Eva Mendes, Kirsten Dunst, Monica Bellucci, Drew Barrymore, Lindsay Lohan, Sigourney Weaver and many others. Shulman was a mezzo-soprano.

Within Russia, she was the original voice actress for characters in the animated films Little Longnose (2003), KikoRiki, Alyosha Popovich i Tugarin Zmey, and Prince Ivan and the Grey Wolf (2011).

Shulman dubbed over 700 TV series and films.

=== Radio ===
She was the signature voice of the radio stations Eldoradio, Melodiya, and Baltika.

== Death ==
Shulman died on April 9, 2023 as a result of injuries sustained in a traffic accident. According to Mash, the day before, on April 7, she was hit by a trolleybus.

== Credits ==
=== Filmography ===
- 2009 — «Yeshcho ne vecher» — Tatyana
- 2006 — «Mentovskiye voyny-3» — Sveta
- 2005 — «Kholodilnik i drugiye...» — Maryana Vitalyevna
- 2003 — «Ya vsyo reshu sama» — Vera
- 2003 — «Igra bez pravil» — episodic role

=== Dubbing and voice-over ===
==== Russian voice of foreign actresses ====
Julia Roberts
Year	Title	Role
2012	Mirror Mirror	The Queen; Mirror Queen
2016	Mother's Day	Miranda Collins
2016	Money Monster	Patty Fenn
2017	Smurfs: The Lost Village	Smurf Willow
2017	Wonder	Isabel Pullman
2018	Ben Is Back	Holly Burns

Drew Barrymore
Year	Title	Role
2000	Charlie's Angels	Dylan Sanders
2003	Charlie's Angels: Full Throttle	Dylan Sanders
2004	50 First Dates	Lucy Whitmore
2009	Everybody's Fine	Rosie Goode

Ashley Judd
Year	Title	Role
2001	Someone like You	Jane Goodale
2002	High Crimes	Claire Kubik
2010	Tooth Fairy	Carly Harris
2013	Olympus Has Fallen	Margaret Asher
2017	Twin Peaks	Beverly Paige

Kirsten Dunst
Year	Title	Role
2002	Spider-Man	Mary Jane Watson
2004	Wimbledon	Lizzie Bradbury
2004	Spider-Man 2	Mary Jane Watson
2007	Spider-Man 3	Mary Jane Watson

Year	Title	Role	Actrees
2003	Tears of the Sun	Dr. Lena Fiore Kendricks	Monica Bellucci
2003	Once Upon a Time in Mexico	Carolina	Salma Hayek
2005	Herbie: Fully Loaded	Maggie Peyton	Lindsay Lohan
2006	Just My Luck	Ashley Albright	Lindsay Lohan
2008	WALL-E	Axiom's computer	Sigourney Weaver
2009	Avatar	Dr. Grace Augustine	Sigourney Weaver
2010	The Sorcerer's Apprentice	Veronica Gorloisen	Monica Bellucci
2016	Assassin's Creed	Dr. Sofia Rikkin	Marion Cotillard
2017	Rock'n Roll	Marion Cotillard	
2019	Drunk Parents	Nancy Teagarten	Salma Hayek
2021	House of Gucci	Giuseppina Auriemma	Salma Hayek

==== Other dubbing works ====
List of Russian dubbing performances in feature films
Year	Title	Role
1993	Peter Pan (Note: Dubbing 2002.)	Mary Darling
1995	A Goofy Movie (Note: Dubbing 2005.)	Stacey
1995	Toy Story (Note: Dubbing 2004.)	voice on Intercom at «Pizza Planet»
1999	Asterix and Obelix vs. Caesar (Note: Dubbing 2000.)	Falbala
2000	Autumn in New York	Sarah Volpe
2000	The Weight of Water	Anethe Christenson
2000	The Beach	Françoise
2000	102 Dalmatians	Chloe Simon
2000	Dracula 2000 (Note: Dubbing by «Nevafilm», 2001.)	Solina
2001	A Knight's Tale	Kate
2001	America's Sweethearts	Gwen Harrison
2001	Crossroads	Kit
2002	Bad Company	Julie Benson
2002	The Sweetest Thing	Courtney Rockcliffe
2002	The New Guy	Nora
2002	Serving Sara	Kate
2002	Ballistic: Ecks vs. Sever	Rayne Ecks
2002	Treasure Planet	Sarah Hawkins
2002	Die Another Day	Verity
2003	28 Days Later	episodic role
2003	Daddy Day Care	Kim Hinton
2003	Finding Nemo	Dory
2003	Pirates of the Caribbean: The Curse of the Black Pearl	Giselle
2003	S.W.A.T.	Chris Sanchez
2003	Brother Bear	Female Lover Bear
2003	The Haunted Mansion	Emma
2003	Peter Pan	Mrs. Darling
2003	Stuck on You	April Mercedes
2003	Mona Lisa Smile	Constance Baker
2003	Cold Mountain	Ruby Thewes
2003	The Zodiac	Laura Parish
2004	Win a Date with Tad Hamilton!	Cathy Feely
2004	White Chicks	Brittany Wilson
2004	Shark Tale	Katie Current
2004	Fakiren fra Bilbao	Louise
2004	National Treasure	Dr. Abigail Chase
2004	Christmas with the Kranks	Mary
2004	Spanglish	Deborah Clasky
2004	The Incredibles	Honey
2005	Cursed	Ellie Myers
2005	Guess Who	Keisha Jones
2005	Cinderella Man	Mae Braddock
2006	Snow Cake	Maggie
2006	Cars	Minny
2006	The Wild	Bridget
2006	Scary Movie 4	Brenda Meeks
2006	Over the Hedge	Gladys Sharp
2006	The Devil Wears Prada	Serena
2006	Open Season	Giselle
2006	Casino Royale	Vesper Lynd
2007	Surf's Up	Edna Maverick
2007	Superbad	Jules
2007	National Treasure: Book of Secrets	Dr. Abigail Chase
2008	Meet the Spartans	Queen Margo
2008	Fly Me to the Moon	Nat's Mom
2008	Flash of Genius	Phyllis Kearns
2008	Open Season 2	Giselle
2008	Bedtime Stories	Aspen
2009	Race to Witch Mountain	Dr. Alex Friedman
2009	Veronika Decides to Die	Veronika Deklava
2009	The Last House on the Left (Note: Dubbing by «Nevafilm», 2011.)	Emma Collingwood
2010	Percy Jackson & the Olympians: The Lightning Thief	Medusa
2010	You Again	Ramona Clark
2011	Scream 4 (Note: Dubbing by «Nevafilm», 2011.)	Sidney Prescott
2011	Cars 2	Minny
2012	Maniac	Lucie
2012	Hyde Park on Hudson	Margaret Suckley
2012	Love Is All You Need	Astrid
2012	Great Expectations	Miss Havisham
2013	Europa Report	Dr. Samantha Unger
2013	Un prince (presque) charmant	Mireille Lavantin
2013	Escape from Planet Earth	Kira Supernova
2013	Pain & Gain	Robin Peck
2013	Iron Man 3	Ellen Brandt
2013	The Big Wedding	Eleanor Griffin
2013	The Conjuring	Lorraine Warren
2013	The Lone Ranger	Red Harrington
2013	Eyjafjallajökull	Valérie
2013	Rush	Nurse Gemma
2013	The Zero Theorem	Mancom Computerised Lips
2013	Locke	Gareth's Wife
2013	The F Word	Ellie; Holly
2013	Begin Again	Miriam Hart
2013	Enemy	Adam's mother
2013	Runner Runner	Rebecca Shafran
2013	Machete Kills	Madame Desdemona
2013	The Counselor	Laura
2013	Thor: The Dark World	Eir
2013	The Starving Games	Effoff
2013	Frozen	episodic role
2013	Jack and the Cuckoo-Clock Heart	Madeleine
2013	Oldboy	Judy; Shirley Roos
2013	Haunt	Janet Morello
2013	Better Living Through Chemistry	Elizabeth Roberts; Jane Fonda
2014	Mr. Peabody & Sherman	Patty Peterson; WABAC
2014	Rio 2	news anchor
2014	The Amazing Spider-Man 2	May Parker
2014	Winx Club: The Mystery of the Abyss	Politea
2014	The Fault in Our Stars	Mrs. Waters
2014	L'Ex de ma vie	Daphné
2014	The Purge: Anarchy	Tanya
2014	Sin City: A Dame to Kill For	Wendy
2014	Gone Girl	Shawna Kelly; Marybeth Elliott; Ellen Abbott
2014	Love, Rosie	Ruby
2014	The Loft	Dana
2014	Exodus: Gods and Kings	Bithiah
2014	Annie	Mrs. Kovacevic
2014	The Drop	Detective Romsey
2014	Wild	Cheryl Strayed
2014	She's Funny That Way	Jane Claremont
2014	The Book of Life	La Muerte; Mary Beth
2015	Avengers: Age of Ultron	Madame B.
2015	Inside Out	Forgetter Paula
2015	Spy	Rayna Boyanov; Sharon
2015	The Age of Adaline	Reagan
2015	Ant-Man	Peggy Carter
2015	Fantastic Four	Science Fair Judges
2015	Paper Towns	Mrs. Spiegelman
2015	Ricki and the Flash	Maureen Brummel
2015	The Last Witch Hunter	Witch Queen
2015	Joy	Danica
2015	Alvin and the Chipmunks: The Road Chip	Samantha
2016	Eddie the Eagle	Petra
2016	Zootopia	Dr. Madge Honey Badger; Mrs. Dharma Armadillo
2016	Captain America: Civil War	May Parker
2016	The Angry Birds Movie	Matilda
2016	X-Men: Apocalypse	Moira MacTaggert
2016	Alice Through the Looking Glass	Queen Elsemere
2016	Finding Dory	Dory
2016	The Conjuring 2	Lorraine Warren
2016	Race	Leni Riefenstahl
2016	Slack Bay	Aude van Peteghem
2016	Don't Breathe	Ginger
2016	Equals	Bess
2016	Inferno	Marta Alvarez
2016	Trolls	Chef
2016	Keeping Up with the Joneses	Karen Gaffney
2016	Why Him?	Barb Fleming
2017	Hidden Figures	Dorothy Vaughan
2017	Kingsman: The Golden Circle	Chief of Staff Fox
2017	Spider-Man: Homecoming	Ms. Warren
2017	The Emoji Movie	Smiler
2017	Coco	Mamá Imelda
2017	The Shape of Water	Zelda Delilah Fuller
2018	Mary Poppins Returns	Topsy
2018	The Happytime Murders	episodic role
2018	Hotel Transylvania 3: Summer Vacation	Wanda
2018	La Ch'tite famille	La baronne
2019	Wonder Park	Aunt Albertine
2019	Abominable	Dr. Zara
2019	Hellboy	Vivienne Nimue
2020	Soul	Lulu; Gerel
2021	The Mitchells vs. the Machines	Linda Mitchell
2022	Hotel Transylvania: Transformania	Wanda
2023	My Fairy Troublemaker	Camelia
2023	Apaches	Sarah Bernhardt

==== Dubbing director ====
- Backtrack
- The Trust
- Tinker Bell and the Legend of the NeverBeast
- The Pirate Fairy
- Un prince (presque) charmant
- Groove High
- Dog with a Blog (season 1)
- Secret of the Wings
- 12 Dates of Christmas
- Modern Family (seasons 1 to 5)

=== Video games ===
List of voice performances in video games
Year	Title	Role
2006	Desperate Housewives: The Game	Bree Van de Kamp
2008	007: Quantum of Solace	Vesper
2010	Tangled: The Video Game	Mother Gothel
2011	The Elder Scrolls V: Skyrim	Fura Bloodmouth
2012	Epic Mickey 2: The Power of Two	cow
2013	Dota 2	Luna; Winter Wyvern
2013	The Last of Us	news anchor
2014	Watch Dogs	Clara Lille
2015	Heroes of the Storm	voice of the battlefield «Garden of Horrors»
2015	Assassin's Creed Syndicate	Isabelle Ardant; Lilla Graves; Josephine Fletcher
2015	StarCraft II: Legacy of the Void	Vorazun
2015	Halo 5: Guardians	Anele Pretorius
2016	Everybody's Gone to the Rapture	Lizzie Graves
2016	Deus Ex: Mankind Divided	Adam's Smart Home
2016	Call of Duty: Infinite Warfare	Maureen Ferran
2016	Dishonored 2	Alexandria Hypatia
2016	League of Legends	Elementalist Lux
2017	Bless Online	Calandra
2017	The Legend of Zelda: Breath of the Wild	Impa
2020	Valorant	Sage
2023	The Legend of Zelda: Tears of the Kingdom	Impa
2023	World of Warcraft	Vanessa VanCleef
