= We Can't Live Without Cosmos =

- Film poster
- Directed by: Konstantin Bronzit
- Written by: Konstantin Bronzit
- Produced by: Aleksandr Boyarsky
- Release date: April 25, 2015 (San Francisco International Film Festival)
- Running time: 16 minutes
- Country: Russia
- Language: English

We Can't Live Without Cosmos (Russian: Мы не можем жить без космоса, My ne mozhem zhit bez kosmosa) is a 2015 Russian animated short film directed and written by Konstantin Bronzit. It is produced by Alexander Boyarsky. The film received critical praise and wide recognition. It received many awards including a nomination for the Academy Award for Best Animated Short Film at the 88th Academy Awards.

== Plot summary ==
Two lifelong friends – designated by the numbers 1203 and 1204 – grow up with the shared dream of becoming cosmonauts. They easily pass the many physical tests they take during their cosmonaut training, and they even attempt to simulate the feel of flying through space by bouncing on their beds. They are ultimately selected for the next mission, with 1203 being launched solo and 1204 standing by as the reserve cosmonaut. The launch at first goes smoothly, but communication with the ship is soon lost; it is implied that 1203 dies in the vacuum of space. Inconsolable with grief, 1204 refuses to take off his spacesuit; an X-ray shows him curled up in a fetal position in the torso. Eventually, medical staff saw his helmet off, but find the suit empty except for a photo of the two friends in their spacesuits. They then look up to see a hole shaped like 1204's body in the ceiling above his bed, and 1204 is shown drifting suitless through space, where the still-suited 1203 grabs him by the arm.

== Awards and nominations ==
- Academy Award for Best Animated Short Film – Nominated
- Aspen Shortsfest Special Jury Prize – Won
- Animafest Zagreb Grand Prize Award – Won
- Annecy International Animated Film Festival – Feature Film – Won
- Cape Cod International Film Festival – Best Animated Short Film – Won
- China International New Media Short Film Festival – KingBonn Award – Won
- Hiroshima International Animation Festival – Grand Pix – Nominated
- Imago Film Festival – Best of Show – Won
- Marcin Award – Best Youths' Short Movie – Won
- Melbourne International Film Festival – Best Animated Short Film – Won (Alexander Boyarsky, Sergey Selyakov; Producers with Konstantin Bronzit)
- Nika Awards – Best Animated Film – Nominated
- Rhode Island International Film Festival – Grand Prize – Best Animation – Won
- Tokyo Anime Award
  - Short Film Competition – Grand Prize – Won
  - Short Film – Tokyo Metropolitan Governor Prize – Won
- San Francisco International Film Festival – Golden Gate Award – Best Animated Short Film – Nominated
- Animation Show of Shows – Won
