= Dobrinya and the Dragon =

- Theatrical release poster
- Directed by: Ilya Maksimov (ru)
- Written by: Aleksandr Boyarsky; Ilya Maksimov; Maksim Sveshnikov
- Produced by: Aleksandr Boyarsky; Sergey Selyanov (ru)
- Starring: Yekaterina Gorohovskaya; Sergey Makovetskiy; Valeriy Solovyov; Yuri Tarasov; Andrey Tolubeyev
- Production companies: Melnitsa Animation Studio; CTB Film Company
- Distributed by: Nashe Kino; Karoprokat
- Release date: March 15, 2006
- Running time: 65 minutes
- Country: Russia
- Language: Russian
- Budget: $ 4,500,000
- Box office: $ 6,864,576

Dobrinya and the Dragon (Russian: Добрыня Никитич и Змей Горыныч, Dobrynya Nikitich i Zmey Gorynych, lit. 'Dobrynya Nikitich and Zmey Gorynych') is a Russian traditionally animated feature film directed by Ilya Maksimov, made by Melnitsa Animation Studio. It opened in Russia on March 15, 2006. It is the second film in Melnitsa's The Three Bogatyrs series the first was Alyosha Popovich and Tugarin Zmey.

The plot is based on the mythology surrounding the title characters: Dobrynya Nikitich and Zmey Gorynych. The film contains many elements of parody and jokes about The Matrix, Star Wars, The Meeting Place Cannot Be Changed, Seventeen Moments of Spring and other famous movies.

Prince Vladimir's niece, Zabava, is kidnapped. Dobrynya Nikitich and his young apprentice, Yelisey, go to find her, discovering betrayal and treachery where least expected.

== Plot ==
The Prince of Kiev accidentally learns that his niece, Zabava, fell in love with a simple messenger, Yelisey, and intends to escape with him. Dissatisfied with this, the prince decides to send Yelisey on an assignment, and Zabava to marry. The Prince tells Yelisey to bring the Bogatyr Dobrynya Nikitich an order - to collect a tribute from the Crimean Khan Becket. To the great displeasure of Dobrynya, the order contains a princely order to bring Yelisey along with him.

The Prince presents Zabava with many marriage proposals, but she does not like any of the candidates. In the meantime, Dobrynya Nikitich collects tribute from the khan by force, and rescues Yelisey, who had been taken prisoner. Back in Kiev, the noble merchant Kolyvan comes to the prince. Kolyvan, a gambling master, promises to forgive the Prince's large debt, if the Prince will let Kolyvan marry Zabava. The Prince reluctantly agrees, and Kolyvan, with the help of one of his debtors, the three-headed dragon Zmey Gorynych, arranges the abduction of Zabava and hides her in a village.

Returning to Kiev, Dobrynya Nikitich and Yelisey notice that the prince and his boyars are mourning the missing princess. Dobrynya Nikitich is shocked when he finds out that the kidnapper is Zmey Gorynych, because the dragon was his best friend. However, in response to Dobrynya's offer to go in search of Zabava, prince sends Dobrynya on vacation, but Dobrynya Nikitich and Yelisey, disobeying the order, go to see Zmey Gorynych. Meanwhile, Kolyvan declares himself the savior of Zabava and decides to marry her, but she refuses him. Then Kolyvan takes Zabava to Kudykina mountain - to another of Kolyvan's debtors Baba-Yaga and demands that she bewitch Zabava.

Dobrynya Nikitich and Yelisey come to Zmey Gorynych, who declares that he is not involved in the kidnapping of the princess. However, the same night, feeling guilty for deceiving Dobrynya, Zmey Gorynych decides to rescue Zabava, and, on a camel, goes in search of Kolyvan, leaving an explanatory note. But Kolyvan, with the help of Baba Yaga's hut on chicken legs overcomes Zmey Gorynych and hides him with Zabava in the closet. The camel runs away.

The next morning, Yelisey finds Gorynych's note and tells Dobrynya about it. Dobrynya is very disappointed by the deceit of Zmey Gorynych. Together with Yelisey, Dobrynya goes in search of Kolyvan. In the meantime, the prince, upon learning of Dobrynya's departure, writes a letter to Kolyvan, and he asks Baba Yaga for help, but none of her spells can break the strong spirit of Dobrynya Nikitich. Then Kolyvan orders the khan Becket, who was also his debtor, to get rid of the hero. He takes Yelisey and the camel he found prisoner, but Dobrynya Nikitich rescues them and learns from the Khan that Kolyvan is hiding on Kudykina Mountain.

Zabava and Zmey Gorynych run away from the hut, but the latter cannot fly and thus begins to sink in the swamp. Dobrynya Nikitich and Yelisey come and rescue him. Then Baba Yaga, summoning an evil force, attacks the heroes. After a long battle, Dobrynya overcomes Baba Yaga. Kolyvan tries to escape, but Dobrynya Nikitich catches him and must decide what to do with him. While Dobrynya, Yelisey, Zabava, and Zmey Gorynych confer, Kolyvan escapes.

Dobrynya Nikitich, Zmey Gorynych, Yelisey and Zabava return home. On the way Gorynych learns how to fly and flies away, and Dobrynya Nikitich, Yelisey and Zabava return to Kiev. The prince is very glad to see his niece, but still against her marriage to Yelisey. However, Dobrynya persuades the prince to change his mind, after which Yelisey and Zabava are married in a magnificent wedding.

== Box office ==
The film opened at #2 in the box office in Russia and the CIS, and grossed around $3,500,000.

== See also ==
- History of Russian animation
- List of animated feature films
- Prince Vladimir (film)
