= Little Longnose =

- Original poster
- Directed by: Ilya Maximov
- Screenplay by: Aleksandr Boyarsky
- Based on: Dwarf Nose and Little Muck by Wilhelm Hauff
- Produced by: Sergey Selyanov; Aleksandr Boyarsky
- Starring: Albert Asadullin; Yelena Shulman; Yevgeniya Igumnova; Natalia Danilova
- Music by: Valentin Vasenkov
- Production company: Melnitsa Animation Studio
- Distributed by: Intercinema Art
- Release date: 20 March 2003
- Running time: 82 minutes
- Country: Russia
- Language: Russian

Little Longnose (Russian: Ка́рлик Нос, Karlik Nos) is a 2003 Russian traditionally animated feature film directed by Ilya Maximov. It was co-produced by Melnitsa Animation Studio and CTB, and is the first feature-length animated film by either company. The film is a combined adaptation of the fairy tales "Dwarf Nose" and "Little Muck" by Wilhelm Hauff.

It opened in Russia on March 20, 2003, and had 375,000 admissions during its theatrical run. A computer game based on the film was produced by Melnitsa, K-D Labs, and 1C.

== Plot ==
A witch seeks out a kind-hearted child in order to awaken a great stone beast named Dagal. She tracks down Jacob, the son of the shoemaker Heinz and the grocer Hanna, and invites him into her castle. When Jacob refuses to aid the witch in her plan, the witch transforms him into an ugly hunchbacked dwarf with a long nose. The witch is convinced that Jacob will be unable to withstand the social rejection and return to her. Jacob finds that seven years have passed during his time in the castle; Heinz died of grief in Jacob's absence, and Hanna is unable to recognize Jacob upon his return. At the same time, the King's daughter Princess Greta is turned into a goose by the witch after she discovers her in her father's library stealing a spell which will help her rule the kingdom. Jacob and Greta meet and plan to overthrow the witch and get back to their families and true forms.

== Voice cast ==
- Albert Asadullin as Jacob
- Yelena Shulman as young Jacob
- Yevgeniya Igumnova as Greta
- Natalia Danilova as the Witch
- Igor Shibanov as Urban, the Witch's nephew
- Ivan Krasko as the King
- Viktor Sukhorukov as the superstitious castle guard
- Konstantin Bronzit as the Grand Master of the Court
- Mikhail Chernyak as the first castle entrance guard
- Aleksandr Boyarsky as the second castle entrance guard

== See also ==
- History of Russian animation
- Konstantin Bronzit
- List of animated feature films of 2003
