= Ivan Tsarevich and the Gray Wolf 2 =

- Directed by: Vladimir Toropchin
- Screenplay by: Vladimir Toropchin; Aleksandr Boyarsky; Svetlana Sachenko
- Produced by: Sergei Selyanov; Aleksandr Boyarsky
- Starring: Nikita Yefremov; Aleksandr Boyarsky
- Edited by: Sergei Glezin
- Music by: Mikhail Chertischev
- Production companies: Melnitsa Animation Studio; CTB
- Distributed by: Cinema Fund
- Release date: 26 December 2013
- Running time: 73 minutes
- Country: Russia
- Language: Russian
- Budget: $2 115 600
- Box office: $20 962 988

Ivan Tsarevich and the Gray Wolf 2 also commonly known as Prince Ivan and the Grey Wolf 2 (Russian: Иван Царевич и Серый волк 2, romanized: Ivan Tsarevich i Seriy volk 2) is a 2013 Russian full-length traditionally-animated film directed by Vladimir Toropchin.

== Plot ==
One day the Scholar Cat reads Pushkin's poem Ruslan and Lyudmila aloud; Vasilisa listens and dreams of romance and adventure.

Ivan and Vasilisa have been married for a year already and are the second persons of the state. Ivan is almost always busy with state affairs, in fact having the role of the War Minister, while his wife is bored. Because of this, the couple quarrel, and the King with the Wolf and the Cat think how to reconcile them. The Cat appeals for help to the "villain in retirement" Chernomor, who has long lost his beard and now is working as a clown. He is promised the role of Othello in the theater of the faraway kingdom as an award for the successful abduction of Vasilisa, since in his soul he is a tragedian. But because of the sorcerer's sister, Naina's bat, and the "two-way curse" of Chernomor's beard of these heroes, there is confusion in "place of destination", a flight to the Moon and much more...

== Cast ==
- Nikita Yefremov - Ivan Tsarevich
- Aleksandr Boyarsky - Gray Wolf
- Mikhail Boyarsky - Scholar Cat
- Tatiana Bunina - Vasilisa
- Ivan Okhlobystin - The King
- Irina Rakhmanova - Frog
- Maksim Sergeev - Chernomor
- Andrei Lyovin - heroes
- Anatoly Petrov - Elder
- Elena Shulman - mermaid
- Ekaterina Gorokhovskaya - Naina

== Awards ==
The film received the Best Animated Film prize at the 2014 Golden Eagle Awards.
