= Ivan Tsarevich and the Gray Wolf (film) =

- Directed by: Vladimir Toropchin
- Screenplay by: Rostislav Khait; Leonid Barats; Sergei Petreikov; Aleksandr Boyarsky (participated)
- Produced by: Aleksandr Boyarsky; Sergei Selyanov
- Starring: Nikita Yefremov; Artur Smolyaninov
- Edited by: Sergei Glezin
- Music by: Valentin Vasenkov; Igor Rasteryaev
- Production companies: Melnitsa Animation Studio; CTB
- Release date: 29 December 2011
- Running time: 80 minutes
- Country: Russia
- Language: Russian
- Budget: $7.5 million
- Box office: $29 million

Ivan Tsarevich and the Gray Wolf also commonly known as Prince Ivan and the Grey Wolf (Russian: Иван Царевич и Серый волк, romanized: Ivan Tsarevich i Seriy volk) is a 2011 Russian animated film directed by Vladimir Toropchin.

== Plot ==
The young princess Vasilisa from a faraway kingdom is too enthusiastic about her education and she dreams of marrying out of love only. Her father, an elderly king, not unfamiliar with intrigues, gives up in trying to get his daughter to "settle down". Meanwhile, his minister, cunning and dexterous, but not very intelligent, under the influence of a living shadow-spirit with sin in half decides to steal the famous royal key from the secret storage. In the opinion of this spirit, the best way to realize this plan is to marry Vasilisa. However, before the minister manages to convince the king in what he wants, the king announces to his daughter that she must marry the first man she meets. And this man turns out to be a certain Ivan from the neighboring kingdom - a simple guy, hard-working and good-natured, who dreams of becoming a fireman. By chance, the "unwilling bride and groom" fall in love with each other. But in order to defend their right to happiness, they have to endure many trials.

== Cast ==
- Artur Smolyaninov - Gray Wolf
- Nikita Yefremov - Ivan Tsarevich
- Mikhail Boyarsky - Scholar Cat
- Tatiana Bunina - Vasilisa
- Ivan Okhlobystin - The King
- Viktor Sukhorukov - First Minister
- Aleksandr Boyarsky - The Spirit (Shadow)
- Elena Shulman - Mermaid, a woman with buckets, a woman in a fire
- Kristina Asmus - Squirrel
- Liya Akhedzhakova - Baba Yaga
- Sergey Russkin - Koschei
- Sergei Garmash - Serpent Gorynych
- Oleg Kulikovich - Magic ball, foreman, heroes
- Konstantin Bronzit - The Emperor
- Anatoly Petrov - Cook, townsperson
