= The Three Bogatyrs =

2012 animated film series

The Three Bogatyrs - Три богатыря
- Created by: Melnitsa Animation Studio

Films and television
- Film(s): Alyosha Popovich and Tugarin Zmey (2004) Алёша Попович и Тугарин Змей (2004); Dobrynya Nikitich and Zmey Gorynych (2006) Добрыня Никитич и Змей Горыныч (2006); Ilya Muromets and Nightingale the Robber (2007) Илья Муромец и Соловей-Разбойник (2007); How Not to Rescue a Princess (2010) Три богатыря и Шамаханская царица (2010); Three Heroes on Distant Shores (2012) Три богатыря на дальних берегах (2012); Three Heroes. Horse Course (2015) Три богатыря. Ход конём (2015); Three Heroes and the Sea King (2016) Три богатыря и морской царь (2016); Three Heroes and the Princess of Egypt (2017) Три богатыря и принцесса Египта (2017); Three Heroes and The Heiress to the Throne (2018) Три богатыря и наследница престола (2018); Horse Julius and Big Horse Racing (2020) Конь Юлий и большие скачки (2020); Three Heroes and Horse Julius on the Throne (2021) Три богатыря и Конь на троне (2021); Three Heroes and the Navel of the Earth (2023) Три богатыря и Пуп Земли (2023); Three Heroes: Not a Day Without a Feat (2024) Три богатыря. Ни дня без подвига (2024); Three Heroes: Not a Day Without a Feat 2 (2025) Три богатыря. Ни дня без подвига 2 (2025); Three Heroes and the Light is a Wedge (2025) Три богатыря и свет клином (2025)

The Three Bogatyrs (Russian: Три богатыря, Tri bogatyrya) is a Russian animated franchise produced by Melnitsa Animation Studio. The films feature the voices of Sergey Makovetsky, Dimitry Vysotsky, Liya Medvedeva, Valery Soloviev, Oleg Kulikovich, Oleg Tabakov, Anatoly Petrov, Andrei Tolubeyev, and Fyodor Bondarchuk with Elizaveta Boyarskaya. The overarching plot throughout the series follows the adventures of three bogatyrs: Alyosha Popovich, Dobrynya Nikitich and Ilya Muromets.

The series grossed over $135 million, making it the highest grossing Russian animated film and rendering it one of the most profitable Russian films in the last 10 years.

This animated film is anachronistic, following the lead of the other films in this series. Set in medieval times, this film combines the history of the Kievan Rus, Slavic, and Russian folklore with more modern elements including a nod to Alexander Pushkin and video games. Each of the first three films featured one of the bogatyrs which were Russian epic heroes, based very loosely on the heroes in the legends about Prince Vladimir in the Kievan-Rus' bylina cycle, a collection of traditional Russian oral epic narrative poems. The fourth film, The Three Bogatyrs, and the Shamakhan Queen, unites all three of the bogatyrs, Alyosha Popovich, Ilya Muromets, and Dobrynya Nikitych, in one film and includes sidekicks such as Julius the talking horse, introduced in the previous films. Unlike the other three animated features, this film also makes reference to the Russian literature from the 19th century and the famous narrative epic of Alexander Pushkin: The Tale of the Golden Cockerel (Сказка о золотом петушке, 1834) with the addition of the Shamakhan Queen.

The commercial success of this series has been increasing since the release of the first film in 2004, because of such marketing.

== Highest grossers ==
Film	Budget	Fees
Alyosha Popovich and Tugarin Zmey (2004)	$4 million	$6,720,288
Dobrynya Nikitich and Zmey Gorynych (2006)	$4,5 million	$6,864,576
Ilya Muromets and Nightingale the Robber (2007)	$2 million	$12,432,144
How Not to Rescue a Princess (2010)	$2,5 million	$24,288,720
Three Heroes on Distant Shores (2012)	$3,5 million	$32,000,000
Three Heroes. Horse Course (2015)	$3,5 million	$24,576,288

== Feature films ==
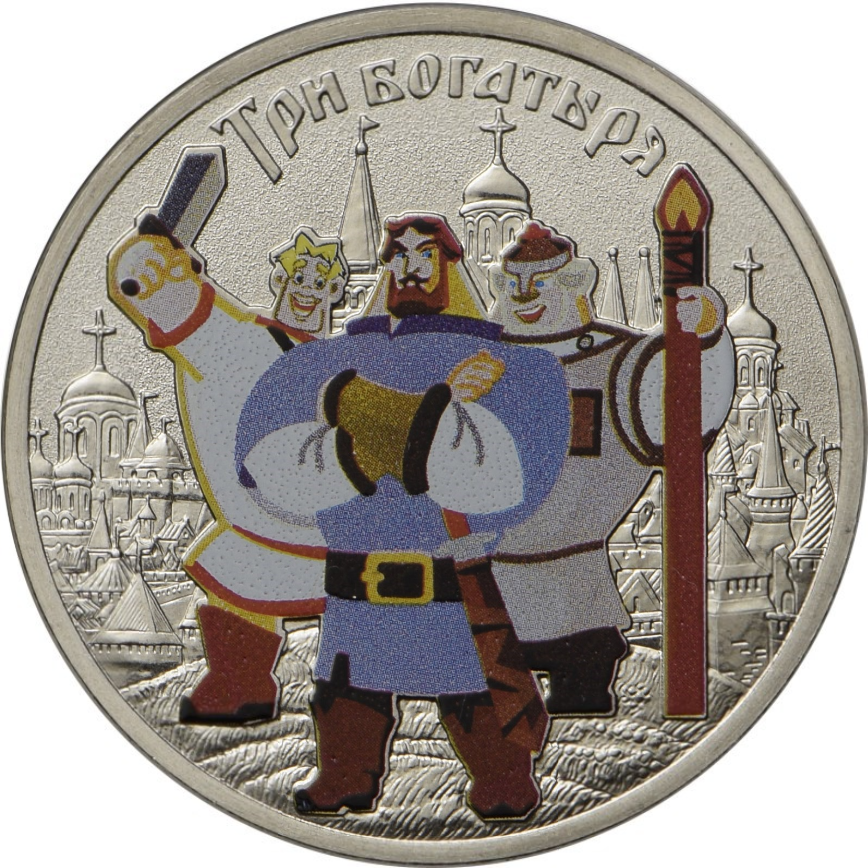
The Three Bogatyrs

=== Alyosha Popovich and Tugarin Zmey (2004) ===
"Alyosha Popovich and Tugarin Zmey (2004)" the screen version of the Russian bylina about Alesha Popovic and his enemy Tugarin the Serpent.

=== Ilya Muromets and Nightingale the Robber (2007) ===
This is the third installation of the series and the story revolves around Ilya Muromets and his horse defeating Nightingale the Bandit's building-leveling whistle and they both send him to prison. Ilya is later dismissed from the Prince of Kiev's service after a dispute over ownership of his beloved stallion. When Nightingale escapes from prison, stealing all of the prince's gold and Ilya's horse to boot, Ilya and the Prince captures the bandit.

=== How Not to Rescue a Princess (2010) ===
The Three Bogatyrs and the Shamakhan Queen or How Not to Rescue a Princess is the fourth film in the animated series and was released December 30, 2010.

The DVD was released on 17 February 2011 and during the first six weeks made 566,731,786 rubles, breaking the record for Russian animated films and earning a spot as one of the most profitable Russian films in the last 10 years.

=== Three Heroes on Distant Shores (2012) ===
In English-speaking countries, it was distributed as "Three Bogatyrs Far Far away", which was commercially successful despite some negative reviews.

The premise is that Kolyvan and Baba Yaga plan to take over the palace of the Prince of Kiev. They succeed in their attempt with the help of a singular army—two enormous bunnies. They also create a fake source of legitimation, the doubles of the three bogatyrs, who affirm that the charlatans are the legitimate successors of the Prince. In the meantime, with the help of further magic, Baba Yaga banishes the real bogatyrs to a remote shore. The plot develops through various episodes involving the impostors with their bunnies, the Prince of Kiev with the horse Iulii, the bogatyrs' wives with the doubles, the real bogatyrs with the indigenous people and a giant gorilla, and the appearance of some characters from the previous series—Tikhon, babka and the dragon Gorynych.

The film is perhaps most successful in presenting a straight criticism of Russian society and rulers. It is a satire that is undoubtedly addressed at contemporary Russia, but that has in itself recurrent traits of satirical works emerging at different times during historical Russian and Soviet eras. These traits include: infatuation with foreign products and towards foreigners, ineptitude of the rulers to govern, corruption, unfair tax collection, high prices on produce, and swift acceptance of new impostors. This type of satirical accent acquires even more weight when followed by shots of nationalist characters, such as the beautiful domes of the village that assume different colors from the reflection of the rising sun.

To the contrary of many contemporary foreign animated films, Three Bogatyrs relies more on traditional, drawn animation than on computer graphics. As in many animated movies made in Russia, characters and scenes are first drawn, scanned, and only then do computer animators fill in the tasks of coloring, adding backgrounds and special effects.

=== Three Heroes. Horse Course (2015) ===
Also known as "Roundabout Way and New Adventures of Ancient Bogatyrs."

This story revolves around a court horse named Julius Caesar. The horse is tasked with the mission of saving the Grand Duke of Kiev while the Bogatyrs are away, attempting to capture a notorious robber. As the plot unfolds, the antagonist’s ambitions extend beyond Russia, aiming for global domination. The primary villain, a sentient oak tree, manipulates and deceives unsuspecting individuals through cunning gambles. Alongside him, the ruthless robber Potanya presents another challenge. The film reimagines classic Russian mythology with a fresh narrative, blending humor, adventure, and folklore.

== Other sequels ==
Other sequels consist of The Three Heroes and the Sea King (2016), Three Heroes and the Princess of Egypt (2017), Three Heroes and the Heir to the Throne (2018), Horse Julius and Big Horse Racing (2020), and Three Heroes and Horse Julius on the Throne (2021).

== Characters ==
- Prince of Kiev - The ruler of Kievan Rus.
- Ilya Muromets - The oldest and most powerful bogatyr; married to Alenushka, a journalist.
- Dobrynya Nikitich - Bogatyr who loves to sleep, and believes that dreams bring powers; head of the Prince's Guard; married to Nastasya Philippovna.
- Alyosha Popovich - The youngest bogatyr; born in Rostov; married to Lyubova; friends with Julius Caesar the Talking Horse and Tikhon.
- Kolyvan - Fat merchant who had the magical power to win in the lottery. He became a friend to the Prince of Kiev and Baba-Yaga.
- Zmey Gorinich - Three-headed dragon; friend of Dobrynya Nikitich. Although in the Bylinas, Dobrynya fought the beast, in the films Dobrynya trusts him.
- Tugarin Zmey - Evil and greedy; commander of the Tugar army.
- Baba Yaga - Happy old woman who brews potions and, unlike in some fairy tales, does not eat anyone. Deals with forest and wetland ecology. Friends with Kolyvan and released his debts.
- Basileus - Roman Emperor, the "sworn brother" to Prince of Kiev. Bad, greedy and cowardly: all the qualities of the prince of Kiev, doubled. (from Macedonian dynasty?)
- Nightingale the Robber - Evil, treacherous and cunning thief. Stole gold coins from the Prince of Kiev as well as the horse of Ilya Muromets.
- Burushka - the horse of Ilya Muromets.
- Julius Caesar, The Talking Horse - The horse of Alyosha Popovich; born in Novgorod, where he read a lot of books, because he lived in the Church library. He named himself after the Roman dictator.
- Vasya - The camel of Dobrynya Nikitich.
- Oak - The antagonist of the sixth movie.
- Potanya - The sea pirate.

== See also ==
- Russian animation
