= Lavatory – Lovestory =

2007 Russian animated short film

Lavatory – Lovestory (Russian: Уборная история — любовная история) is a 2007 Russian animated short film directed by Konstantin Bronzit, about a lavatory attendant who finds a flower bouquet in her tip jar. The film was nominated for an Oscar in the 81st Annual Academy Awards and won multiple awards at film festivals. It is also on the Animation Show of Shows.

== Plot summary ==
A lonely woman working as an attendant for a male restroom receives a bouquet of colorful flowers in her tip jar. She continues to receive different colors of bouquets when she is not looking, and searches to find out who is giving her flowers. She discovers the man, holding a red flower. The film ends with both of them reading the newspaper together in the male restroom attendant booth. It is revealed that he was the attendant for the neighboring women's restroom, the booth for which now has a "Help Wanted" sign.
