= Konstantin Bronzit =

Russian animator and film director (born 1965)

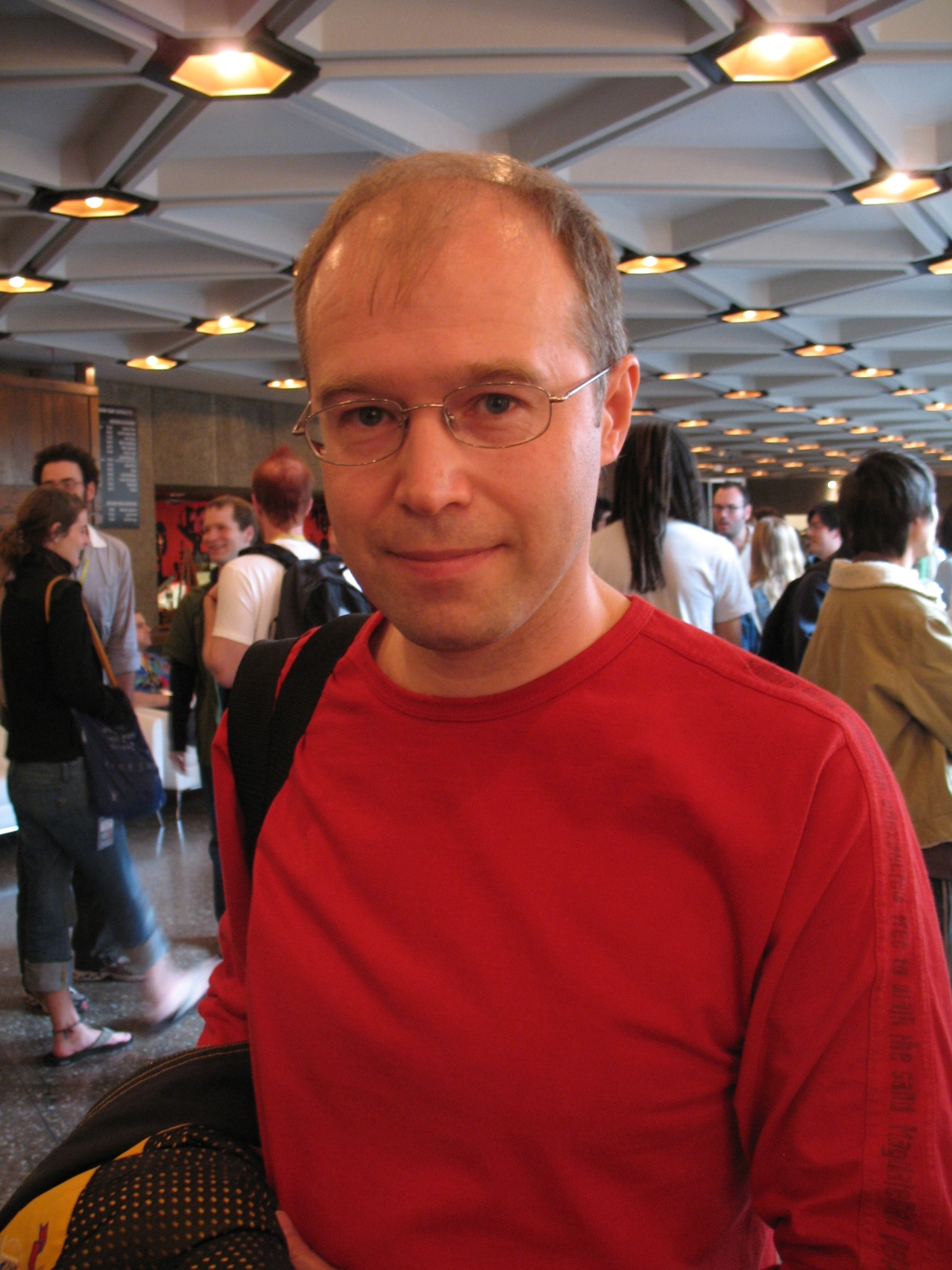
Bronzit in 2006

Konstantin Eduardovich Bronzit (Russian: Константи́н Эдуа́рдович Бронзи́т; born 12 April 1965) is a Russian animator and animation director who was nominated for the Academy Award for Best Animated Short Film three times (2009, 2016, 2026). He works at one of the largest Russian animation studio — Melnitsa Animation Studio, as the art director and consultant.

== Life and career ==
Bronzit was born in Leningrad. He is a graduate of the Saint Petersburg Repin Institute of Fine Art in 1983. He worked as an artist-animator at the animated film studio Lennauchfilm (Studio of Popular Science Films), which created educational animations. It was there that he completed his first film, Merry-Go-Round or The Round-About (Карусель, Karusel), in 1988.

In 1992, he graduated from the V. Mukhina Leningrad Higher Art and Industrial Academy and in 1994 from the "Higher Courses in Scriptwriting and Directing in Moscow" under the tutorship of Fyodor Khitruk.

From 1993-1995 he worked as a scriptwriter, director and animator at the Moscow Animation Studio "Pilot", where he created several short films. From 1996-1999 he worked at the studio Pozitiv TV. In 1999 he completed his short film At the Ends of the Earth, which was aggressively pushed around the film festival circuit by the French distributor Folimage, eventually gathering nearly 70 awards.

Since 1999 he has worked at Melnitsa Animation Studio, where he served as art director in the projects Adventures in Emerald City (1999–2000) and Little Longnose (2003).

In 2004 he served as the director of the animated feature film Alyosha Popovich and Tugarin Zmey. According to Bronzit, the very short timeframe (only a year was given to them to complete the film) forced him to write the script at the same time as the film was being animated. The film was a success in Russia, and spawned another two films by different directors in the same vein.

== Legacy ==
His 2007 short film Lavatory Lovestory won the Best Scenario Award at the 12th Open Russian Festival of Animated Film and got the 3rd-best rating among the jury and was nominated for an Academy Award for Best Animated Short Film in 2009. His film, At The Ends Of The Earth, was included in the Animation Show of Shows.

In 2011 Bronzit voiced the Emperor in Ivan Tsarevich and the Gray Wolf.

His 2015 short film We Can't Live Without Cosmos received many awards in addition to nominations for an Academy Award for Best Animated Short Film at 88th Academy Awards. The film won Grand Prix for best short film at the World Festival of Animated film - Animafest Zagreb.

== Filmography ==
Year	Production	Notes
1991	Cuboroid	
1993	Tuk-Tuk	
1994	Switchcraft	
1995	Pacifier	
1997	Die Hard	
1999	At the Ends of the Earth	
2003	The God	
2004	Alyosha Popovich and Tugarin Zmey	
2007	Lavatory Lovestory	
2015	We Can't Live Without Cosmos	
2018	Three Heroes. The Heiress to the Throne	
2019	He Can't Live Without Cosmos	
2025	The Three Sisters	Credited as "Timur Kognov"

== See also ==
- List of Russian Academy Award winners and nominees
