= List of Academy Award winners and nominees from Russia =

This article is a list of list of Russian-born people working in the cinema industry who have been nominated for or won an Academy Award. It includes people with origins from Russian Empire, Soviet Union and Russia.

== Best Actor in a Leading Role ==
Best Actor
Year	Name	Film	Status	Milestone / Notes
1956	Yul Brynner	The King and I	Won	Brynner was a Soviet citizen who later became a naturalised US citizen.

== Best Actor in a Supporting Role ==
Best Actor in a Supporting Role
Year	Name	Film	Status	Milestone / Notes
1936	Mischa Auer	My Man Godfrey	Nominated	First Russian to be nominated for an acting Oscar.
1945	Michael Chekhov	Spellbound	Nominated	
1977	Mikhail Baryshnikov	The Turning Point	Nominated	
2024	Yura Borisov	Anora	Nominated	

== Best Actress in a Supporting Role ==
Best Actress in a Supporting Role
Year	Name	Film	Status	Milestone / Notes
1936	Maria Ouspenskaya	Dodsworth	Nominated	First Russian actress to be nominated for an Oscar.
1939	Maria Ouspenskaya	Love Affair	Nominated	
1964	Lila Kedrova	Zorba the Greek	Won	Kedrova was a Russian-born French actress.

== Best Director ==
Best Director
Year	Name	Film	Status	Notes
1927/1928	Lewis Milestone	Two Arabian Knights	Won	Russian-Jewish; First Russian to win an Oscar.
1929/1930	Lewis Milestone	All Quiet on the Western Front	Won	First Russian to win multiple Oscars. First director to win Best Director twice.
1930/1931	Lewis Milestone	The Front Page	Nominated	

== Best Adapted Screenplay ==
Best Adapted Screenplay
Year	Name	Film	Status	Milestone / Notes
1931-32	Samuel Hoffenstein	Dr. Jekyll and Mr. Hyde	Nominated	Shared with Percy Heath.
1932-33	Robert Riskin	Lady for a Day	Nominated	
1932-33	Sonya Levien	State Fair	Nominated	Shared with Paul Green.
1934	Robert Riskin	It Happened One Night	Won	
1934	Ben Hecht	Viva Villa!	Nominated	
1936	Robert Riskin	Mr. Deeds Goes to Town	Nominated	
1938	Robert Riskin	You Can't Take It with You	Nominated	
1939	Ben Hecht	Wuthering Heights	Nominated	Shared with Charles MacArthur.
1944	Samuel Hoffenstein	Laura	Nominated	Shared with Jay Dratler & Elizabeth Reinhardt.
1945	Albert Maltz	Pride of the Marines	Nominated	
1949	Robert Rossen	All the King's Men	Nominated	
1950	Albert Maltz	Broken Arrow	Nominated	(Note: Michael Blankfort was originally nominated as the screenwriter of Broken Arrow. In 1991, research proved blacklisted Albert Maltz was the screenwriter and his credit was restored. Blankfort was removed from the nomination and it was given to Maltz.)
1955	Paddy Chayefsky	Marty	Won	
1961	Abby Mann	Judgment at Nuremberg	Won	
1961	Robert Rossen	The Hustler	Nominated	Shared with Sidney Carroll.
1962	Vladimir Nabokov	Lolita	Nominated	
1973	Alvin Sargent	Paper Moon	Nominated	
1973	Robert Towne	The Last Detail	Nominated	
1977	Alvin Sargent	Julia	Won	
1980	Alvin Sargent	Ordinary People	Won	
1984	Robert Towne	Greystoke: The Legend of Tarzan, Lord of the Apes	Nominated	Shared with Michael Austin. Towne was credited under the pseudonym P.H. Vazak due to unhappiness with co-writer Austin's alterations and the finished film itself.
2005	Tony Kushner	Munich	Nominated	Shared with Eric Roth.
2012	Tony Kushner	Lincoln	Nominated	

== Best Original Screenplay ==
Best Original Screenplay
Year	Name	Film	Status	Milestone / Notes
1955	Sonya Levien	Interrupted Melody	Won	Shared with William Ludwig.
1961	Valentin Yezhov; Grigory Chukhray	Ballad of a Soldier	Nominated	

== Best Story ==
Best Story
Year	Name	Film	Status	Milestone / Notes
1946	Victor Trivas	The Stranger	Nominated	
1955	Henri Troyat	The Sheep Has Five Legs	Nominated	Shared with Jean Marsan, Jacques Perret, Henri Verneuil & Raoul Ploquin.

== Best International Feature Film ==
Best International Feature Film
Year	Film	Russian Title	Status	Director(s)	Notes	Ref
1968	War and Peace	Война и мир	Won	Sergei Bondarchuk		
1969	The Brothers Karamazov	Братья Карамазовы	Nominated	Kirill Lavrov, Ivan Pyryev & Mikhail Ulyanov		
1971	Tchaikovsky	Чайкoвский	Nominated	Igor Talankin		
1972	The Dawns Here Are Quiet	А зори здесь тихие	Nominated	Stanislav Rostotsky		
1975	Dersu Uzala	Дерсу Узала	Won	Akira Kurosawa	Soviet-Japanese co-production	
1978	White Bim Black Ear	Белый Бим Черное ухо	Nominated	Stanislav Rostotsky		
1980	Moscow Does Not Believe in Tears	Москва слезам не верит	Won	Vladimir Menshov		
1982	Private Life	Частная жизнь	Nominated	Yuli Raizman		
1984	Wartime Romance	Военно-полевой роман	Nominated	Pyotr Todorovsky	Soviet Ukrainian production	
1992	Close to Eden	Урга	Nominated	Nikita Mikhalkov	First nomination for Russia after the dissolution of the Soviet Union.	
1994	Burnt by the Sun	Утомлённые солнцем	Won	Nikita Mikhalkov		
1996	Prisoner of the Mountains	Кавказский пленник	Nominated	Sergei Bodrov		
1997	The Thief	Вор	Nominated	Pavel Chukhray		
2007	12	12	Nominated	Nikita Mikhalkov		
2014	Leviathan	Левиафан	Nominated	Andrey Zvyagintsev		
2017	Loveless	Нелюбовь	Nominated	Andrey Zvyagintsev		

== Best Art Direction ==
Best Art Direction
Year	Name	Film	Status	Milestone / Notes
1937	Alexander Toluboff	Walter Wanger's Vogues of 1938	Nominated	Black and White
1938	Boris Leven	Alexander's Ragtime Band	Nominated	Nominated in the black and white category
1938	Alexander Toluboff	Algiers	Nominated	Black and White
1939	Alexander Toluboff	Stagecoach	Nominated	Black and White
1940	Alexander Golitzen	Foreign Correspondent	Nominated	
1941	Alexander Golitzen	Sundown	Nominated	
1942	Alexander Golitzen	Arabian Nights	Nominated	
1943	Alexander Golitzen	Phantom of the Opera	Won	
1944	Alexander Golitzen	The Climax	Nominated	
1956	Boris Leven	Giant	Nominated	
1960	Alexander Golitzen	Spartacus	Won	
1961	Boris Leven	West Side Story	Won	Nominated in the black-and-white category
1961	Alexander Golitzen	Flower Drum Song	Nominated	
1962	Alexander Golitzen	To Kill a Mockingbird	Won	
1962	Alexander Golitzen	That Touch of Mink	Nominated	
1965	Boris Leven	The Sound of Music	Nominated	
1966	Alexander Golitzen	Gambit	Nominated	
1966	Boris Leven	The Sand Pebbles	Nominated	
1967	Alexander Golitzen	Thoroughly Modern Millie	Nominated	
1968	Mikhail Bogdanov; Gennady Myasnikov	War and Peace	Nominated	
1968	Boris Leven	Star!	Nominated	
1969	Alexander Golitzen	Sweet Charity	Nominated	
1970	Alexander Golitzen	Airport	Nominated	
1971	Boris Leven	The Andromeda Strain	Nominated	
1974	Alexander Golitzen	Earthquake	Nominated	
1981	Patrizia von Brandenstein	Ragtime	Nominated	of German-Russian descent
1984	Patrizia von Brandenstein	Amadeus	Won	of German-Russian descent
1986	Boris Leven	The Color of Money	Nominated	
1987	Patrizia von Brandenstein	The Untouchables	Nominated	of German-Russian descent
2014	Maria Djurkovic	The Imitation Game	Nominated	

== Best Cinematography ==
Best Cinematography
Year	Name	Film	Status	Milestone / Notes
1953	Joseph Ruttenberg	Julius Caesar	Nominated	
1954	Boris Kaufman	On the Waterfront	Won	
1956	Boris Kaufman	Baby Doll	Nominated	
1956	Joseph Ruttenberg	Somebody Up There Likes Me	Won	
1958	Joseph Ruttenberg	Gigi	Won	
1960	Joseph Ruttenberg	BUtterfield 8	Nominated	

== Best Documentary Feature Film ==
Best Documentary Feature
Year	Name	Film	Status	Milestone / Notes
1942	Ilya Kopalin and Leonid Varlamov	Moscow Strikes Back	Won	
1942	Victor Stoloff	Little Isles of Freedom	Nominated	
2015	Den Tolmor; Evgeny Afineevsky	Winter on Fire: Ukraine's Fight for Freedom	Nominated	
2025	Pavel Talankin	Mr Nobody Against Putin	Won	Shared with David Borenstein, Helle Faber and Alžběta Karásková

== Best Animated Short Film ==
Best Animated Short Film
Year	Name	Film	Status	Milestone / Notes
1989	Aleksandr Petrov	The Cow	Nominated	
1995	Alexiy Kharitidi	Gagarin	Nominated	
1997	Aleksandr Petrov	The Mermaid	Nominated	
1999	Aleksandr Petrov	The Old Man and the Sea	Won	
2007	Aleksandr Petrov	My Love	Nominated	
2008	Konstantin Bronzit	Lavatory – Lovestory	Nominated	
2015	Konstantin Bronzit	We Can't Live Without Cosmos	Nominated	
2021	Anton Dyakov	Boxballet	Nominated	
2025	Konstantin Bronzit	The Three Sisters	Nominated	Credited as "Timur Kognov"

== Best Live Action Short Film ==
Best Live Action Short Film
Year	Name	Film	Status	Milestone / Notes
1952	Boris Vermont	Light in the Window	Won	
1953	Boris Vermont	Joy of Life	Nominated	

== Best Original Score ==
Best Original Music Score
Year	Name	Film	Status	Milestone / Notes
1937	Constantin Bakaleinikoff	Something to Sing About	Nominated	
1937	Dimitri Tiomkin	Lost Horizon	Nominated	
1937	Boris Morros	Souls at Sea	Nominated	
1938	Boris Morros	Tropic Holiday	Nominated	
1939	Lud Gluskin	The Man in the Iron Mask	Nominated	
1939	Dimitri Tiomkin	Mr. Smith Goes to Washington	Nominated	
1939	Aaron Copland	Of Mice and Men	Nominated	
1940	Aaron Copland	Our Town	Nominated	
1940	Artie Shaw	Second Chorus	Nominated	
1941	Bernard Herrmann	The Devil and Daniel Webster	Won	
1941	Bernard Herrmann	Citizen Kane	Nominated	
1942	Max Terr	The Gold Rush	Nominated	
1942	Dimitri Tiomkin	The Corsican Brothers	Nominated	
1943	Dimitri Tiomkin	The Moon and Sixpence	Nominated	
1943	Aaron Copland	The North Star	Nominated	
1943	Constantin Bakaleinikoff	The Fallen Sparrow	Nominated	
1944	Constantin Bakaleinikoff	None But the Lonely Heart	Nominated	
1944	Constantin Bakaleinikoff	Higher and Higher	Nominated	
1944	Dimitri Tiomkin	The Bridge of San Luis Rey	Nominated	
1945	Daniele Amfitheatrof	Guest Wife	Nominated	He was an Italian composer of Russian origin
1946	Bernard Herrmann	Anna and the King of Siam	Nominated	
1947	Daniele Amfitheatrof	Song of the South	Nominated	Shared nomination with Paul J. Smith and Charles Wolcott
1947	David Raksin	Forever Amber	Nominated	
1949	Aaron Copland	The Heiress	Won	
1949	Dimitri Tiomkin	Champion	Nominated	
1952	Dimitri Tiomkin	High Noon	Won	
1952	Herschel Burke Gilbert	The Thief	Nominated	
1954	Dimitri Tiomkin	The High and the Mighty	Won	
1956	Dimitri Tiomkin	Giant	Nominated	
1958	Dimitri Tiomkin	The Old Man and the Sea	Won	
1958	Yuri Fayer; Gennady Rozhdestvensky	The Bolshoi Ballet	Nominated	
1960	Dimitri Tiomkin	The Alamo	Nominated	
1961	Dimitri Tiomkin	The Guns of Navarone	Nominated	
1961	Dmitri Shostakovich	Khovanshchina	Nominated	
1963	Dimitri Tiomkin	55 Days at Peking	Nominated	
1964	Dimitri Tiomkin	The Fall of the Roman Empire	Nominated	
1971	Dimitri Tiomkin	Tchaikovsky	Nominated	
1976	Bernard Herrmann	Obsession	Nominated	
1976	Bernard Herrmann	Taxi Driver	Nominated	

== Best Original Song ==
Best Original Song
Year	Name	Film	Song	Status	Milestone / Notes
1935	Al Dubin	Gold Diggers of 1935	"Lullaby of Broadway"	Won	
1937	Al Dubin	Mr. Dodd Takes the Air	"Remember Me"	Nominated	
1937	Ira Gershwin and George Gershwin	Shall We Dance	"They Can't Take That Away from Me"	Nominated	
1943	Al Dubin	Stage Door Canteen	"We Mustn't Say Goodbye"	Nominated	
1944	Ira Gershwin	Cover Girl	"Long Ago (and Far Away)"	Nominated	
1947	Josef Myrow	Mother Wore Tights	"You Do"	Nominated	
1950	Josef Myrow	Wabash Avenue	"Wilhelmina"	Nominated	
1950	Al Hoffman	Cinderella	"Bibbidi-Bobbidi-Boo"	Nominated	
1952	Dimitri Tiomkin	High Noon	"The Ballad of High Noon"	Won	
1954	Ira Gershwin	A Star Is Born	"The Man That Got Away"	Nominated	
1954	Dimitri Tiomkin	The High and the Mighty	"The High and the Mighty"	Nominated	
1955	Hy Zaret	Unchained	"Unchained Melody"	Nominated	
1956	Dimitri Tiomkin	Friendly Persuasion	"Friendly Persuasion"	Nominated	
1957	Dimitri Tiomkin	Wild Is the Wind	"Wild Is the Wind"	Nominated	
1959	Dimitri Tiomkin	The Young Land	"Strange Are the Ways of Love"	Nominated	
1960	Dimitri Tiomkin	The Alamo	"The Green Leaves of Summer"	Nominated	
1961	Dimitri Tiomkin	Town Without Pity	"Town Without Pity"	Nominated	
1963	Dimitri Tiomkin	55 Days at Peking	"So Little Time"	Nominated	

== Nominations and winners ==
No. of wins	No. of nominations
32	161

== See also ==
- List of Russian submissions for the Academy Award for Best International Feature Film
- List of Soviet submissions for the Academy Award for Best International Feature Film
- Cinema of Russia
- Cinema of the Russian Empire
- Cinema of the Soviet Union
