= The Old Man and the Sea (1999 film) =

- DVD cover
- Directed by: Aleksandr Petrov
- Screenplay by: Aleksandr Petrov
- Based on: The Old Man and the Sea; 1952 novella by Ernest Hemingway
- Produced by: Bernard Lajoie; Tatsuo Shimamura
- Starring: Gordon Pinsent; Kevin Duhaney; Yôji Matsuda
- Cinematography: Sergey Reshetnikov
- Edited by: Denis Papillon
- Music by: Denis L. Chartrand; Normand Roger
- Distributed by: Filmoption International
- Release date: May 22, 1999
- Running time: 20 minutes
- Countries: Russia; Canada; Japan
- Languages: Russian; English; French; Japanese

The Old Man and the Sea (Russian: Старик и море) is a 1999 paint-on-glass-animated short film directed by Russian animator Aleksandr Petrov, based on the 1952 novel of the same name by Ernest Hemingway. The film won many awards, including the Academy Award for Best Animated Short Film.

Work on the film took place in Montreal over a period of two and a half years and was funded by an assortment of Russian, Canadian and Japanese companies. French and English-language soundtracks to the film were released concurrently.

== Plot ==
The film follows the plot of the original novel, but at times emphasizes different points. It opens with the dream sequence of an old man named Santiago, who dreams about his childhood on the masts of a ship and lions on the shores.

When he wakes up, we find out that he has gone 84 days without catching any fish at all. He is apparently so unlucky that his young apprentice, Manolin, has been forbidden by his parents to sail with the old man and been ordered to fish with more successful fishermen. Still dedicated to the old man, however, the boy visits Santiago's shack in the morning. The next day, before sunrise, Santiago and Manolin make their way to the seashore. Santiago says that he will venture far out into the Gulf to fish. Manolin wants to come, but Santiago insists on going alone.

After venturing far out, Santiago sets his lines and soon catches a small fish which he decides to use as bait. A big fish that he is sure is a marlin takes his bait. Unable to pull in the great marlin, Santiago instead finds the fish pulling his skiff. An unspecified number of days pass in this manner, during which the old man bears the tension of the line with his body. On one night, Santiago dreams of his youth, of how he won an arm wrestling match against the strongest black man in town. On another night, though he is wounded by the struggle and in pain, Santiago dreams that he and the marlin are brothers, swimming through the ocean together. An extended fantasy sequence is animated here by Petrov. Suddenly, he is woken up; the marlin tries to take advantage of the situation and escape. As the fish jumps out of the water, the old man sees for the first time just how big it is.

Eventually, the fish begins to circle the skiff, indicating his tiredness to the old man. With each circle, Santiago tries to pull it in a little closer. As the fish swims under the boat, Santiago manages to stab the marlin with a harpoon, thereby ending the long battle.

Santiago straps the marlin to his skiff and heads home, triumphant. However, in a short while, sharks are attracted to the trail of blood left by the marlin in the water. Santiago kills one with his harpoon, losing that weapon in the process. He makes a new harpoon by strapping his knife to the end of an oar to help ward off the next line of sharks and manages to kill a few more. Soon, however, the sharks have devoured the marlin's entire carcass, leaving only its skeleton. The old man castigates himself for sacrificing the marlin.

The next morning, a group of fishermen gathers around the boat where the fish's skeleton is still attached. Manolin, worried during the old man's endeavor, brings him food and drink and finds the old man lying in his cabin. When he wakes, he tells him that they had boats searching for him and that his parents allowed him to fish together once again.

== Cast ==
- Gordon Pinsent as Old Man (voice)
- Kevin Duhaney as Boy (voice)
- Yōji Matsuda
- Rentarô Mikuni

== Creators ==
Director	Aleksandr Petrov
Scenario	Aleksandr Petrov
Animators	Aleksandr Petrov; Dmitri Petrov
Video operator	Thierry Fargeau
Producers	Bernard Lajoie; Tatsuo Shimamura
Creative Producer	Pascal Blais
Executive producers	Pascal Blais; Jean-Yves Martel; Shizuo Ohashi
Composers	Denis L. Chartrand; Normand Roger
Voice actors	Gordon Pinsent (English); Kevin Delaye (English); Yoji Matsuda (Japanese); Rentarō Mikuni (Japanese)
Editors	Denis Papillon

== History and technique ==
A screen capture of the film

The project was initiated in 1995 after Petrov (who had made his first films in Russia) had his first meeting with Pascal Blais Studio, a Canadian animation studio. The film was partially funded by and was made at their studio. Other funding came from Imagica Corporation, Dentsu Tec and NHK from Japan, and Panorama studio from Yaroslavl, Russia (of which Aleksandr Petrov is the head).

Work on the film began in March 1997. It took Aleksandr Petrov and his son Dmitri Petrov (who helped his father) until April 1999 to paint each of the 29,000+ frames. The film's technique, pastel oil paintings on glass, is mastered by only a handful of animators in the world. Petrov used his fingertips in addition to various paintbrushes to paint on different glass sheets positioned on multiple levels, each covered with slow-drying oil paints. After photographing each frame painted on the glass sheets, which was four times larger than the usual A4-sized canvas, he had to slightly modify the painting for the next frame and so on. For the shooting of the frames a special adapted motion-control camera system was built, probably the most precise computerized animation stand ever made. On this an IMAX camera was mounted, and a video-assist camera was then attached to the IMAX camera.

== Artistic style ==
The film's style is analogous to that used in Petrov's other films and can be characterized as a type of Romantic realism. People, animals and landscapes are painted and animated in a very realistic fashion, but there are sections where Petrov attempts to visually show a character's inner thoughts and dreams. For example, the film contains a scene where the fisherman dreams that his younger self and the marlin are brothers swimming through the sea and the sky.

== Awards ==
- 1999 - Cinanima: "Grand Prize"
- 1999 - Japan Media Arts Festival: "Grand Prize" (Animation)
- 1999 - Montréal World Film Festival: Nominated for "First Prize (Short Films)"
- 2000 - Academy Award for Animated Short Film
- 2000 - Annecy International Animated Film Festival: "Audience Award", "Grand Prix for Best Animated Short Film"
- 2000 - BAFTA Awards: Nominated for "Best Animated Short Film"
- 2000 - Buster International Children's Film Festival: "Politiken's Short Film Award"
- 2000 - Genie Awards: Nominated for "Best Animated Short Film"
- 2000 - Jutra Awards: "Jutra" in the category "Best Animated Film"
- 2000 - Mainichi Film Concours: "Ofuji Noburo Award"
- 2000 - Saint Petersburg Message to Man International Film Festival: "Special Jury Prize" in the category "International Competition"
- 2000 - Zagreb World Festival of Animated Films: "First Prize" in "Category C - 15 Min. to 30 Min."
- 2001 - Burbank International Children's Film Festival: "Director's Gold Award"
- 2001 - San Diego International Film Festival: "Festival Award" in the category "Best Animation"

== DVD releases ==
The film is currently available on two DVD releases, English and French ("Le Vieil Homme et la mer"). Despite similar covers, their contents are actually significantly different. The one with the English cover contains both the English and French sound versions of the animated film as well as the 17-minute short film Hemingway: A Portrait directed by Érik Canuel (the two films were originally screened together at IMAX theatres).

The French DVD contains only the French-language versions of everything on the English DVD as well as Petrov's previous films: The Cow (1989), The Dream of a Ridiculous Man (1992) and Mermaid (1996), which are 10, 20 and 10 minutes long respectively and are in their original Russian language with French subtitles. There is also a 9-minute-long "making of" film.

== See also ==
- History of Russian animation
