= Viktor Astafyev =

Russian-Soviet writer

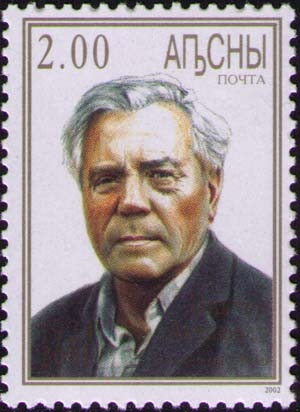
- Astafyev on a stamp of Abkhazia
- Born: Viktor Petrovich Astafyev; 1 May 1924; Ovsyanka, Krasnoyarsk Krai
- Died: 29 November 2001 (aged 77); Krasnoyarsk
- Writing career
- Genre: Fiction

Viktor Petrovich Astafyev (Note: Also spelled Astafiev or Astaf'ev) (Russian: Ви́ктор Петро́вич Аста́фьев; 1 May 1924 – 29 November 2001) was a Soviet and Russian writer, playwright and screenwriter. He was recognized with the title Hero of Socialist Labour in 1989.

== Biography ==
Viktor Astafyev was born in the village of Ovsyanka (then Krasnoyarsk Uyezd, Yeniseysk Governorate, Russian SFSR) on the bank of the Yenisei River. His father, Pyotr Pavlovich Astafyev, was the son of a relatively rich mill-owner and part-time hunter who spent most of his time at home, and his mother Lydia Ilyinichna Astafyeva (née Potylitsyna) came from a peasant family. In his 2000 autobiography Viktor Astafyev remembered his father's household as a place where the men, led by his grandfather Pavel Yakovlevich, were on continuous binge, while all the work was done by two women, Lydia and her mother-in-law, Maria Osipova, Pavel Yakovlevich's young second wife.

In 1931, two tragedies struck the Astafyev family. First, Viktor's father, grandfather, and great-grandfather were arrested as part of the Dekulakization campaign and sent to a Siberian labour camp. In July 1931, Viktor's mother drowned in the Yenisei after her rowboat capsized while she was going to Krasnoyarsk prison to bring food to her arrested husband. That year, Pyotr Astafyev received 5 years of prison as an "Enemy of the people" and was sent to the infamous Belomorkanal building-site. Seven-year-old Viktor found himself in the house of his maternal grandparents, Yekaterina Petrovna and Ilya Yevgrafovich Potylitsyn, who gave the boy all their love and care. In 1932, he began attending a local primary school. Astafyev later described his life in the early 1930s in his book of short stories Posledny poklon (The last bow, 1968).

In 1934, Pyotr Astafyev returned from the labour camp and married again. He took Viktor to his new residence, a small forest village Sosnovka, then in 1935 moved the family to Igarka where they settled as spetspereselentsy. Ignored by both his stepmother Taisiya Tcherkasova (who had now given birth to her own son, Nikolai) and father, the boy rebelled and soon found himself homeless and on the streets. In 1937, he was taken to an orphanage and joined the 5th grade of its special school, which he remembered years later with great affection. He began to write poetry, and two of his teachers, Rozhdestvensky and Sokolov, noticed his artistic and literary abilities and did a lot to encourage him. Years later he remembered:

Critics for some reason tend to feel sorry for me and for the difficult childhood that I had. This vexes me a lot. More than that... Given such a chance, I’d have chosen the very same life, full of things, happiness, victories and defeats. The latter only help to see the world better, to feel kindness deeper. There would have been just one thing I'd have changed – asked fate to keep mother with me. [Long pause] Orphanage, wandering, the boarding school – all this I had to live through in Igarka. But there were other things – books and songs, skiing trips, childhood happiness, first tears of epiphany... It was there that for the first time I've heard the radio, the gramophone, the brass orchestra... And it was in Igarka that I wrote my first ever short story which my teacher Rozhdestvensky published in our school's self-edited journal. And the newspaper Bolshevik Zapolyarya published my 4-line verse.

On 1 May 1941, Astafyev graduated from school and joined a brickyard as a transport worker. As the Great Patriotic War broke out, he was working in the Kureika station, a manual worker at local village Soviet. In August he left Igarka and joined the newly formed railway school in Krasnoyarsk, which he left in June 1942.

=== The war years ===
In October 1942 Astafyev volunteered for the Soviet Army and, after six months spent in reserve units (first in Berdsk, then in Novosibirsk), in April 1943 was moved to the Kaluga region as a soldier of the 92nd Howitzer brigade of the Kiev-Zhitomir division. In May Astafyev went into action, taking part in fierce fighting conducted by the Bryansk, Voronezh and Steppe fronts. In October he was injured while force-crossing the river Dnieper (that was when he lost his right eye) and on 25 November received his first award, the For Courage medal. In January 1944 he returned to action and took part in the Korsun-Shevchenko operation, then (in March and April) in the Kamenets-Podolsky assault and on 25 April was awarded the Order of the Red Star.

On 17 September 1944, Astafyev was badly injured near the Polish town of Dukla and spent the next 8 months in hospitals. "Since then I was unfit for an active service and was drifting from one reserve unit to another until I settled at the postal point of the 1st Ukrainian Front nearby Zhmerinka station. Here I met a fellow soldier, Maria Semyonovna Koryakina, married her after demobilization and went with her to her place in the town of Chusovoy of the Perm (then Molotov) oblast," he wrote in autobiography.

The horrible experience of war remained with Astafyev, becoming the major incentive to become a writer. "About the War... what do I know? Everything and nothing. I was a common soldier and we had our own, soldiers' truth. One rather glib author called it derogatively 'the truth from the trenches' and our 'point of view' – a 'hillock view' (Note: A pun on tochka 'point' (as in tochka zreniya 'point of view') and kochka 'hillock')… But I felt as if I had to tell about the everyday side of the war, of how the trenches smelt, of the way people there lived... The first killed, one of us. The first one you've killed. I had to write of all the monstrous things I've seen," he said years later in an interview.

=== Literary career ===
After his discharge in 1945 Astafyev settled for a while in his wife's parents' house in Chusovoy, then went to Krasnoyarsk, doing various jobs such as locksmith and smelter. In 1950 he started contributing to the Tchusovsky Rabochy (The Tchusovoy Worker) newspaper which in February 1951 published his debut short story "A Civil Man" (Grazhdansky tchelovek), which two years later was reprinted by the Perm-based Zvesda newspaper. In 1954 Astafyev was for the first time published by a Moscow magazine (short story "Splinter", in Smena). In 1955 he left the newspaper and started working upon his first novel Snows are Melting (Tayut Snega) which was published in 1958, as was his first book of short stories Warm Rain (Tyoply Dozhd), dedicated mostly to the experience of Russian soldiers and civilians during recent war. Also in the late 1950s Astafyev joined the regional Perm radio. Working there provided relatively good wages but involved too much blatant propaganda. "I decided to quit after one and a half years, feeling that otherwise I'd just stop respecting myself altogether," he remembered. On 1 October 1958 Astafyev became the member of the RSFSR Union of Writers.

In 1959, Astafyev enrolled in the Maxim Gorky Literature Institute in Moscow; he became friends with Sergey Vikulov, Yevgeny Nosov and a group of Vologda authors. One of several short novels of this period, The Old Oak ("Starodub", 1960), became Astafyev's first European publication: translated into Czech, in 1963 it was published in Prague. After 1962 Astafyev became a professional writer. Maria Koryakina initially helped as his typist but also wrote for publication. (Note: Her first short story "Hard-Earned Happiness" was published in 1965 and she was subsequently the author of 16 books.)

In 1969 Astafyev and his family moved to the city of Vologda where most of his literary friends lived. Several major books – Notches (Zatesi), Mountain Pass, The Last Respect (book 1), Shepherd and His Wife followed in the early 1970s and won Astafyev (now the Order of the Red Banner of Labour two-times chevalier) the RSFSR State Maxim Gorky Prize in December 1975. A year later Nash Sovremennik published "The Tsar Fish", one of his most famous short stories (which gave the title to the compilation). His first play The Bird-Cherry Tree was premiered at the Moscow Yermolova theatre, also in 1976. On 19 October 1978, for the Tsar-Fish book Astafyev received the USSR State Prize.

In 1981 the first edition of The Complete Astafyev in 4 volumes came out. By this time he had bought a house in his native Ovsyanka and moved with his family to Krasnoyarsk. The first TV documentary (directed by Mikhail Litvyakov) "Viktor Astafyev" was shown in 1983. By 1984 four films based on his work had been produced, including Falling Stars by Igor Talankin and Arkady Sirenko's Born Twice, the latter featuring Astafyev as a scriptwriter. Great resonance had his novel Sad Detective (1986), as well as a set of 1987 short stories, including the controversial "The Catching of Cudgeons in Georgia". In 1988–1989 Astafyev visited France (where his Sad Detective was published), Bulgaria (to oversee his 1966 short novel The Theft being screened) and Greece and took part in the 1989 Congress of People's Deputies of the Soviet Union. The epic novel The Cursed and the Slain (Proklyaty i Ubity, books 1 and 2, 1992–1993) brought Astafyev The State Prize of the Russian Federation in May 1996. The same month the Russian president Boris Yeltsin visited Ovsyanka to meet Astafyev. In 1998 the 15-volumes Krasnoyarsk edition of The Complete Astafyev was published.

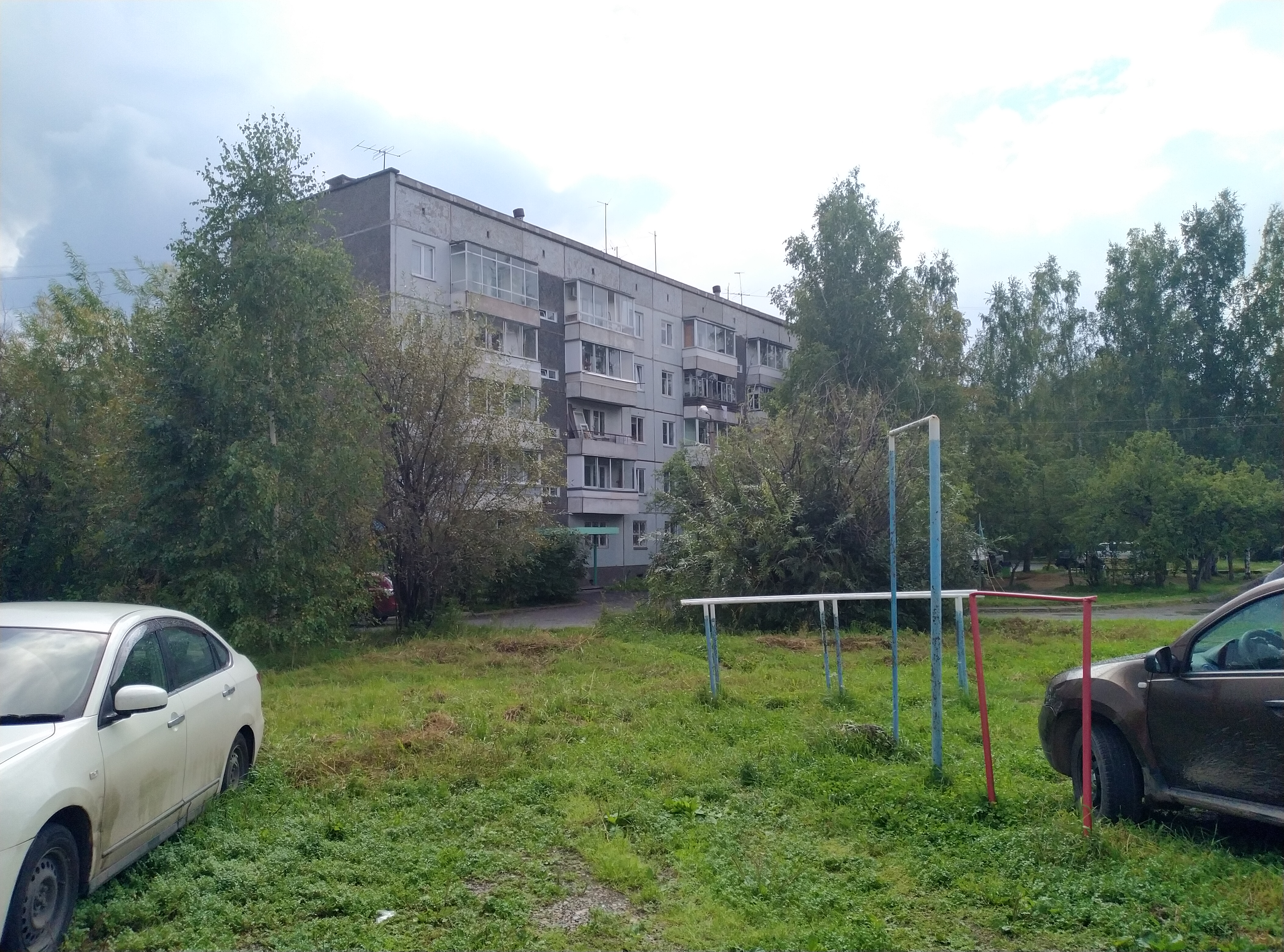
House of Viktor Astafiev in Krasnoyarsk Akademgorodok

Astafyev's last years were not happy ones. In 2000 he suffered a stroke. Not long before his death Astafyev wrote his last words: "I entered a world that was kind and open and I loved it wholeheartedly. I leave a world that is alien, evil and vile and I have nothing to say to all of you by way of farewells." Viktor Astafyev died on 29 November 2001, in Krasnoyarsk. He was buried in his native Ovsyanka.

== Controversy ==
In the mid-1980s, he became embroiled in significant controversy over his writings followed by accusations of chauvinism and xenophobia when the public learned, through samizdat, about the correspondence between the literary historian Natan Eidelman and Astafyev that had been provoked by alleged racist overtones in Astafyev's work Sad Detective and his The Catching of Gudgeons in Georgia (both 1986), the latter deemed offensive by the Georgian readership. At the 8th USSR Writers Union Congress in the summer of 1986, Georgian delegates urged the author to apologize publicly for his insult to the Georgian nation; when he refused, they walked out in protest. In October 1993, he signed the Letter of Forty-Two.

In 1999, his novel Jolly Soldier, which portrayed the horrors of the Soviet Army was met with extremely adverse reaction, which may have brought about a heart failure.

== Legacy ==
In the years when many Soviet war literature authors (like Fyodor Parfyonov or Ivan Stadnyuk) were singing paeans to an idealized, invincible Soviet war hero, crushing the enemy under the Communist Party leadership, Viktor Astafyev became one of the first to rebel against the officially-approved convention and reveal the darker, unglamorous side of what was happening in 1941–1945. He is credited with being one of the major proponents (alongside Viktor Nekrasov, Vasil Bykaŭ, Vladimir Bogomolov, Konstantin Vorobyov) of the so-called The Truth from the Trenches (okopnaya pravda) movement (the term was used originally in a derogatory sense by detractors who argued that former soldiers could not be trusted to write about the war objectively, being ignorant of its greater 'truths') which brought authenticity and harsh realism to the Soviet war literature.

David Gillespie summed up his career as follows:

Astafyev has always been a highly individual writer who conforms to no movements or stereotypes.... He has always remained true to himself, and has retained a certain hard-edged integrity. His novel Prokliaty i ubity [The Damned and the Dead] is a gritty, typically uncompromising picture of war, with many naturalistic descriptions in a style the author has developed since the cathartic Pechal'nyi detektiv. Astafyev remains very much a writer who refuses to be easily categorized: he is neither a Village Prose Writer, nor a writer of "war prose", nor a writer who explores the mistakes of the recent Soviet past. At the same time, he is all of these. Capable of surprising and even shocking his reader, Astafyev maintains a deep lyrical sense that has produced what Eidel'man called "the best descriptions of nature for decades". More than any other writer living in Russia today (with the possible exception of Solzhenitsyn), he is a writer who examines man as subjected to and moulded by the total Soviet experience.

== Honours and awards ==
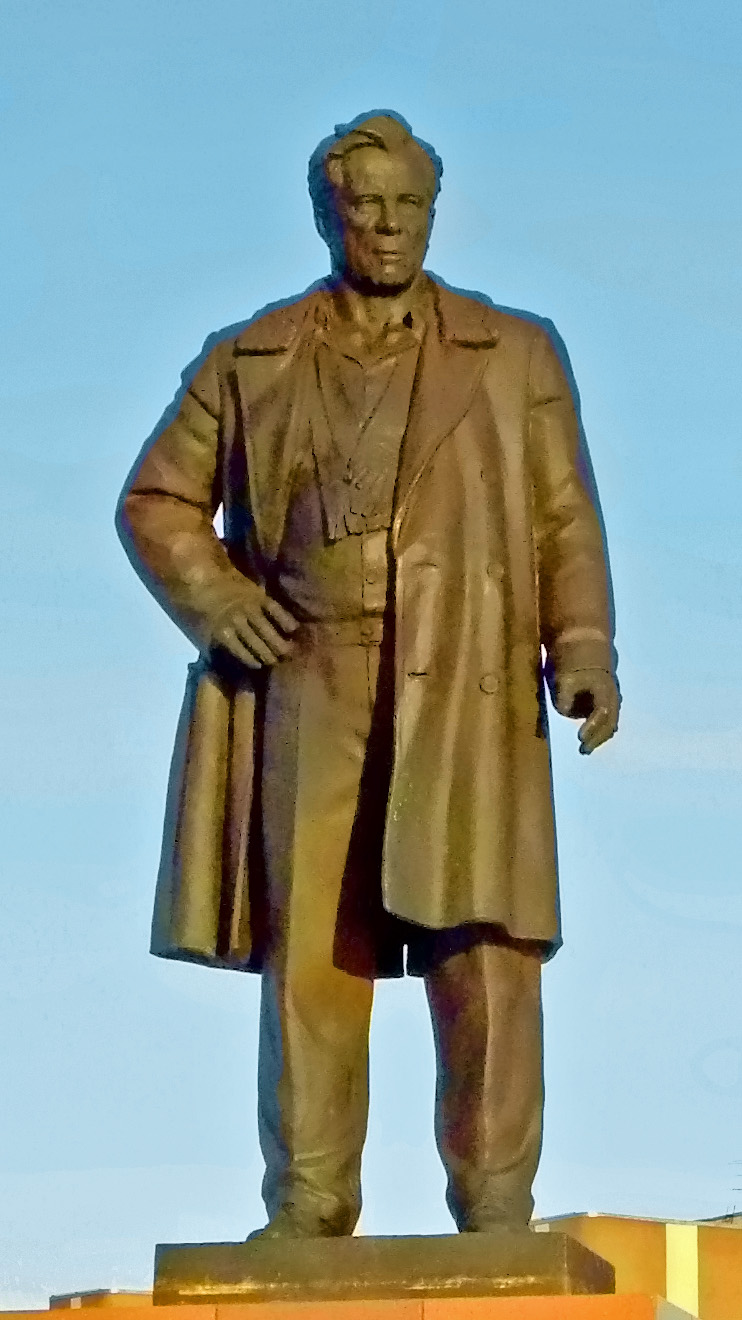
Monument to Astafyev in Krasnoyarsk

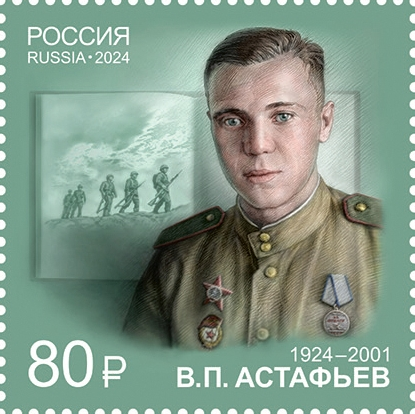
Astafyev on a 2024 stamp of Russia

- Krasnoyarsk State Pedagogical University is named in his honour
- USSR State Prize (1978 – for the story "King Fish" (1976) and 1991 – for his novel "Sighted Staff" (1988))
- Maxim Gorky RSFSR State Prize (1975) – for the story "The Pass" (1959), "Theft" (1966), "Last Bow" (1968), "Shepherd and Shepherdess" (1971)
- State Prize of the Russian Federation (1995 – for his novel "The Cursed and the Slain", 2003 – posthumously)
- Pushkin Prize (Germany, 1997)
- Hero of Socialist Labour (1989)
- Order of Lenin (1989)
- Order of the Red Banner of Labour, three times (1971, 1974, 1984)
- Order of Friendship of Peoples (1981) – the anniversary of the Union of Soviet Writers
- Order of the Patriotic War, 1st class (1985)
- Order of Friendship – 70th anniversary of his birth
- Order of the Red Star
- Order "For Merit to the Fatherland", 2nd class
- Medal "For Courage" (1943)
- Medal "For the Victory over Germany in the Great Patriotic War 1941–1945"

== English translations ==
- The Horse with the Pink Mane, and Other Siberian Stories, Progress Publishers, 1970.
- Queen Fish: A Story in Two Parts and Twelve Episodes, Progress Publishers, 1982.
- To Live Your Life and Other Stories, Raduga Publishers, 1989.

== Bibliography ==
- The Snow is Melting ("Тают снега" – Tayut snega, 1958)
- Theft ("Кража" – Krazha, 1966)
- The Last Tribute ("Последний поклон" – Posledniy poklon, 1968)
- Sheppard and His Wife ("Пастух и пастушка" – Pastukh i pastushka, 1971)
- Czar Fish ("Царь-рыба" – Czar ryba, 1975)
- Sad Detective ("Печальный детектив" – Pechalny detektiv, 1986)
- The Catching of Gudgeons in Georgia ("Ловля пескарей в Грузии" – Lovlya peskarei v Gruzii, 1986)
- The Cursed and Killed ("Прокляты и убиты" – Proklyaty i ubity, 1995)
- The Will to be Alive ("Так хочется жить" – Tak khochetsya zhit', 1995)
- The Jolly Soldier ("Веселый солдат" – Veselyi soldat, 1999)
