= The Gardener (1987 film) =

- Russian: Садовник
- Directed by: Viktor Buturlin
- Written by: Valeri Zalotukha
- Starring: Oleg Borisov; Lev Borisov; Evgenia Smolyaninova; Konstantin Yukhov; Varvara Shabalina
- Cinematography: Vladimir Vasilyev
- Music by: Algirdas Paulavičius (musician)
- Release date: 1987
- Running time: 100 minute
- Country: Soviet Union
- Language: Russian

The Gardener (Russian: Садовник) is a 1987 Soviet drama film directed by Viktor Buturlin.

The film tells the story of a man who grew an apple orchard.

== Plot ==
Alexey Alexeyevich Glazov, a hereditary gardener, grows apples in a collective farm orchard founded by his grandfather. He sent apple tree cuttings by mail, free of charge, to people who requested them for grafting. As a result, he had to testify before a district prosecutor, as he was suspected of illegal trading in socialist property. However, since he returned any money sent to him voluntarily, the case against him was closed.

The apple orchard was economically unprofitable for the collective farm. They planned to replace it with a poultry complex, struggled to allocate workers for the harvest, and lacked a proper storage facility.

Glazov dedicated significant effort to the orchard, often at the expense of his own well-being and that of his family. His two children, who lived elsewhere with their families, had no interest in the orchard, much like the collective farm. The only people who valued the orchard were Uncle Alyosha's brother-in-law, Uncle Kolya Steklov, and a mute teenager named Sanka.

== Cast ==
- Oleg Borisov
- Lev Borisov
- Evgenia Smolyaninova
- Konstantin Yukhov
- Varvara Shabalina
- Irina Rakshina
- Vadim Lobanov
- Nina Usatova
- Viktor Bychkov
- Pyotr Drotskoy
