= The Pink Doll =

The Pink Doll Russian: Розовая кукла
- Directed by: Valentin Olshvang
- Written by: Nadezhda Kozhushanaya
- Produced by: Valentina Khizhnyakova
- Starring: Dmitry Olshvang; Luydmila Denisenkova; O. Pitanova
- Cinematography: Sergey Reshetnikov, Vyacheslav Sumin
- Music by: D. Borisov
- Distributed by: Sverdlovsk Film Studio; School-Studio ShAR
- Release date: 1997
- Running time: 10 minutes
- Country: Russia
- Language: Russian

The Pink Doll (Russian: Розовая кукла, romanized: Rozovaya kukla) is a Russian animated film directed by Valentin Olshvang, produced in 1997.

== Plot ==
One girl had a tedious time all day long with her baby-sitter. When in the evening mother had come, the girl was glad to see her, but mother gave her a present and went to the meeting with an admirer. The girl stayed at home alone. In that present girl found a pink doll, that was the largest one in her collection. Girl began associating this doll as herself, and herself as her mother. This associations gives her deep feelings about this situation, where girl feels her as a bought off.

== A fact ==
This animation is made by technics of paint-on-glass animation.

== Awards ==
- The second place in competition of students film works for award Saint Anna, 1997;
- Award on International Festival of Animated Films Krok in Kyiv, Ukraine, 1997;
- Silver Nail Award for the best animated film on International Festival of Young Cinema Kinoforum, 1997;
- Silver Dove Award at the International Festival of animated cinema in Leipzig, Germany, 1997;
- Award for the most dramatic plot in Russian festival of animation in Tarusa, 1997;
- Best First Film on International Cinema Festival in Zagreb, Croatia, 1998;
- Special award on International Animated Cinema Festival in Hiroshima, Japan, 1998;

== See also ==
- 2nd Open Russian Festival of Animated Film
