= Alexander Golitzen =

American production designer (1908–2005)

Prince Alexander Golitzen (Golitsyn) (February 28, 1908 – July 26, 2005) was a Russian-born American production designer who oversaw art direction on more than 300 movies.

Born in Moscow in the princely Golitsyn family, Alexander Golitzen fled the country with his parents during the Russian Revolution. Travelling via Siberia and China, they arrived in Seattle, where Alexander graduated from high school. He then attended the University of Washington, where he earned a degree in architecture.

He started his art direction career in Los Angeles, as an assistant to Alexander Toluboff, an art director for MGM. He started working with Walter Wanger (a producer) in 1939 and they worked together for many movies. Starting in 1942, and continuing for the next 30 years, he became a unit art director, and later a supervising art director at Universal, overseeing dozens of productions.

Golitzen earned an Oscar nomination for Foreign Correspondent (1940), and received three Oscars for Phantom of the Opera in 1943, Spartacus in 1960 and To Kill a Mockingbird in 1962.

He was also nominated for an Academy Award for his work on Sundown (1941), Arabian Nights (1942), The Climax (1944), Flower Drum Song (1961), That Touch of Mink (1962), Gambit (1966), Thoroughly Modern Millie (1967), Sweet Charity (1969), Airport (1970), and Earthquake (1974). He served on the Academy's board of directors for several years.

Golitzen was married for 72 years to Frances, née Peters, who survived him. They had a daughter Cynthia, a son Peter, five grandchildren and five great-grandchildren.

== See also ==
- Art Directors Guild Hall of Fame
- List of Russian Academy Award winners and nominees — Best Art Direction
