= The Cursed and Killed =

Novel by Viktor Astafyev

- Author: Viktor Astafyev
- Original title: Прокляты и убиты
- Language: Russian
- Genre: Historical novel, war, philosophical, political fiction
- Publisher: АСТ (2006)
- Publication date: 1991 and 1992
- Publication place: Russia
- Media type: Print
- Pages: 896
- ISBN: 978-5-17-112574-5
- Preceded by: Sad Detective (1986)
- Followed by: The Jolly Soldier (1999)

The Cursed and Killed (Russian: Прокляты и убиты) is a novel by Viktor Astafyev, written in the second half of the 1990s. The plot of the novel is partly based on the author's participation in the fighting in the 21st reserve rifle regiment and their crossing of the Dnieper.

Oleg Davydov compared the novel to Vasily Grossman's Life and Fate, and Vasil Bykaŭ considered it the only real novel about the war.

The first book of the novel was written in 1990–1992, the second book in 1992–1994. The novel is unfinished. In March 2000, the writer announced the termination of work on the novel.

== Summary ==
=== The Devil's Pit ===
The epigraph to the first book of the novel is a quote from the New Testament:

If you bite and eat each other,
Take care that you are not
destroyed by each other. Galatians 5: 15

The first book of the novel is set near Berdsk in the late autumn of 1942 and winter of 1943, in the 21st reserve rifle regiment. The number of the regiment and its location correspond to those that actually existed during the great Patriotic war. There is no place of deployment of the reserve regiment today, this place is flooded by the Ob sea.

The action begins with the arrival in the fall of 1942 in the reserve regiment of young recruits, mostly just reached military age. Conscripts are mostly illiterate, recruited from remote towns and villages, and many had conflicts with the law. Due to the fact that the old regiment has not yet left for the front, and the barracks remain overcrowded, recruits are sent to quarantine and kept in inhumane conditions. Staying in quarantine dugouts, recruits are constantly malnourished, exhausted in political work, and many complain about poor-quality uniforms.

After quarantine, everyone gets into one company of the regiment, where they are met by Sergeant Shpator, and Lieutenant Shchus takes command of the company. Constant malnutrition, cold, dampness, and lack of basic conditions are compounded by conflicts between conscripts and their commanders, and many religious recruits are forbidden to pray or mention God in any way. Before the eyes of the boys, the commander beats to death a recruit suffering from incontinence, two twin brothers are shot, who unknowingly left their unit temporarily; a demonstration trial is held over a soldier-manipulator Zelentsov. The author describes the hopeless picture of soldiers 'life in spare parts, young people whose life before that was "mostly miserable, humiliating, impoverished, consisted of standing in queues, receiving rations, coupons, and even fighting for the harvest, which was immediately withdrawn in favor of society."

=== Bridgehead ===
The epigraph to the second book:

Ye have heard that it was said by them of old time,
Thou shalt not kill; and whosoever shall kill shall be in danger of the judgment:
But I say unto you, That whosoever is angry with his brother
without a cause shall be in danger of the judgment... Matthew 5: 21–22

The second book of the novel takes place at the end of September 1943 and, obviously, at the beginning of October 1943 on the Dnieper. Judging by the fact that the book mentions an airborne operation, the prototype of the Velikokrinitsky bridgehead was the bukrin bridgehead near the village of Veliky Bukrin, in which the author participated in the battles. Military units are fictional.

The action of the book begins at the time of preparation of the part for crossing the Dnieper. The second book is a naturalistic description of the fighting during the crossing of the Dnieper, capturing and holding a bridgehead on its Bank for seven and all subsequent days. The author describes the war in extreme detail and cruelly, clearly differentiating those who are on the beachhead (mostly the same boys and a number of commanders), and those who remained on the Eastern Bank (political Department, special Department, field wives, detachments and just cowards). At the same time, the war is described both through the eyes of Soviet soldiers and partly German ones. Much attention is paid to the carnage witnessed by the author himself. At the same time, the war is described both through the eyes of Soviet soldiers and partly German ones.

The second part of the story is more dynamic than the first, which is understandable: "if in the first book "the Devil's pit" there is swearing and stench, then in the second part "Bridgehead" — death. If in the first — obscenity and abomination of a soldier's rear life, then in the second-payback for what they did".

== Reviews ==
The book shocked me.

— Vasil Bykaŭ.

== Themes ==
The novel is largely autobiographical: the author himself, at the age of 17, went to the front as a volunteer, was a signalman, and when crossing the Dnieper, he witnessed the most brutal meat grinder described in the second part of the novel, Bridgehead.

The writer raises the moral problems of relations between people in the conditions of war, the conflict between Christian morality, patriotism and the totalitarian state, the problems of formation of people whose youth fell on the hardest years. The hidden subtext in the novel is the idea of God's punishment of the Soviet people through heavy war.

The title of the novel is taken from a stichera that the Siberian old believers had, "it was written that all those who sow turmoil, war and fratricide on earth will be cursed and killed by God".

== Prizes ==
- The first part of the novel was awarded the "Triumph" prize.
- The novel was nominated for the Russian Booker Prize in 1993.

== Editions ==
- Проза войны. Том первый. — СПб.: Литера, 1993. Тираж: 100 000 экз. ISBN 5-900490-02-5 (т.1)
- Прокляты и убиты. Книга 1. — М.: Вече, 1994 г. Серия: Военный роман Тираж: 100 000 экз.
- Прокляты и убиты. Книга 2. — М.: Вече, 1995 г. Серия: Военный роман Тираж: 20 000 экз.
- Собрание сочинений в 15 томах. Том десятый. Красноярск: Офсет, 1997 г. Тираж: 10 000 экз.
- Избранное. — М.: Терра, 1999 г. Серия: Литература ISBN 5-300-02704-9
- Прокляты и убиты. — М.: Эксмо, 2002 г. Серия: Красная книга русской прозы Тираж: 4000 экз. + 12000 экз. (доп.тираж) ISBN 5-04-009706-9
- Прокляты и убиты. — М.: Эксмо, 2003 г. Тираж: 5100 экз. ISBN 5-699-04253-9
- Прокляты и убиты. — М.: Эксмо, 2005 г. Серия: Русская классика XX века Тираж: 4100 экз. + 4100 экз. (доп.тираж) ISBN 5-699-11435-1
- Прокляты и убиты. — М.: Эксмо, 2006 г.
- Прокляты и убиты. — М.: Эксмо, 2007 г. Серия: Библиотека всемирной литературы (Эксмо) Тираж: 5000 экз. + 4000 экз. (доп.тираж) ISBN 978-5-699-20146-4
- Прокляты и убиты. — М.: Эксмо, 2009 г. Серия: Русская классика Тираж: 4100 экз. ISBN 978-5-699-33805-4
- Прокляты и убиты. — М.: Эксмо, 2010 г. Серия: К 65-летию Великой Победы Тираж: 4000 экз. ISBN 978-5-699-40494-0
- Прокляты и убиты. — М.: Эксмо, 2010 г. Серия: Русская классика Тираж: 4000 экз. ISBN 978-5-699-36702-3
- Прокляты и убиты: роман. — СПб: Азбука, Азбука-Аттикус, 2017. — 832 с. — Тираж 3000 экз. (Азбука-классика) ISBN 978-5-389-12681-7

== Theatrical performance ==
Based on the novel, a play was staged at the Moscow Chekhov's art theater directed by Viktor Ryzhakov (the premiere took place on 5 September 2010).
