= The Dream of a Ridiculous Man =

1877 short story by Fyodor Dostoevsky

"The Dream of a Ridiculous Man" (Russian: Сон смешного человека, Son smeshnogo cheloveka) is a short story by Fyodor Dostoevsky. It chronicles the experiences of a man who decides that there is nothing of any value in the world. Slipping into nihilism with "terrible anguish", he is determined to commit suicide. However, after a chance encounter with a young girl, he begins an inner journey that re-instills a love for his fellow man. The story first appeared in Dostoevsky's self-published monthly journal A Writer's Diary in 1877.

According to literary theorist and Dostoevsky scholar Mikhail Bakhtin, The Dream of a Ridiculous Man is a modern manifestation of the ancient literary genre Menippean satire, and touches on almost all the themes characteristic of Dostoevsky's large-scale works.

== Plot summary ==
The story opens with the narrator wandering the streets of St. Petersburg. He is contemplating the ridiculousness of his own life, and his recent realization that nothing matters to him any more. It is this revelation that leads him to the idea of suicide. He reveals that, some months before, he had bought a revolver with the intent of shooting himself in the head.

Despite a dismal night, the narrator looks up to the sky and views a solitary star. For some reason, seeing this star finally confirms his intention to kill himself and he resolves definitely to do it that night. As he is gazing at the star, a young girl seizes him by the elbow, distressed and seeking his help. He notices that, despite the cold, she is flimsily dressed and soaking wet. Although not able to understand her trembling voice, he gathers that something terrible has happened to the girl's mother. She tries to get him to follow her but he rebuffs her, and when she desperately persists, he stamps his foot and shouts at her.

Back at his apartment, he sinks into a chair and places the gun on a table next to him. He hesitates to shoot himself because of a nagging sense of pity and inner pain that has plagued him since he shunned the little girl. He cannot understand how it can be affecting him so deeply when he has already definitively decided that nothing matters and that he will soon be shooting himself. He intently ponders this and other questions growing out of it, but he still has no doubt that the suicide will happen that night. Unexpectedly, however, he falls asleep.

He descends into a vivid dream. In the dream, he shoots himself in the heart. He dies, but feels no pain from the shot and is still aware of his surroundings. He gathers that there is a funeral and that it is he who is being buried. After an indeterminate amount of time in his cold grave, indifferent and expecting nothing, water begins to drip down onto his left eyelid. Deep indignation arises in his heart and he suddenly feels the physical pain from the gunshot. With his whole being he cries out a prayer to the One who governs all things:

"Whoever Thou may be, if Thou art and if there exists anything more rational than what is now coming to pass, then grant that it happen here as well. But if Thou art taking vengeance upon me for my unwise suicide, through the ugliness and absurdity of this life after death, then know that no torment could compare with the contempt that I shall always feel in silence, though it be through millions of years of martyrdom."

His grave is suddenly opened by an unknown and shadowy figure. This figure pulls him up from his grave, and the two soar through the sky and into space. After flying through space for a long time, they arrive at a star that is exactly like the Earth's Sun. The shadowy companion indicates a small planet, and as they approach it the narrator is ecstatic to see that it is exactly like the Earth. He wonders rapturously whether it also contains the same suffering, and ungrateful, but eternally beloved, children as the Earth that he had abandoned.

He is then placed on what appears to be an idyllic Greek island, where he at once senses an atmosphere of unsullied peace and beauty. He is lovingly welcomed by radiant, joyous people, each of whom wish only to love him and free him from suffering. They are happy, fearless, sinless people who live in communion with the trees and the stars and all the natural world around them. He finds that there is "only a love that seemed to multiply to the point of rapture, but a rapture that was calm, contemplative, and complete". The people fulfill all the natural functions of life, including death, but with serene acceptance and even a kind of ecstatic celebration. He is amazed at the grace and ease with which they are able to love a person like himself, so full of a darkness that they have never known. He lives among them for a long time, and although there are aspects of their all-encompassing spiritual freedom and joy that he cannot fathom, he senses its essence with his heart, and loves and worships them unreservedly.

One day he accidentally teaches the inhabitants how to lie. Somehow, from something he said – perhaps even in jest –, an "atom of falsehood penetrated their hearts and pleased them". This begins the corruption of the utopia. The lies engender sensuality, which gives birth to jealousy, cruelty and pride. They come to know shame, and shame is elevated as a virtue. They begin to separate from each other, and lose their unity. They begin to glorify individuality and speak of "mine" and "thine". Soon, the first blood is shed. Factions are made, wars are waged. Science supplants feeling, and the members of the former utopia become incapable of remembering their former happiness. They tell him: "We have science, and with its help we shall again find the truth, but now we shall accept it consciously. Knowledge is higher than feeling, consciousness of life is higher than life... a knowledge of the laws of happiness is higher than happiness." He pleads with the people to return to their former state, or at least to kill him for his role in their Fall, but they laugh at him and threaten to put him in a madhouse.

Sorrow enters his soul with great force, but at that moment he awakens. The room is completely silent and he jumps up in amazement. He catches sight of his revolver, but pushes it away. He is a changed man, thoroughly thankful for life and convinced of man's basic goodness and potential for limitless love. He dedicates his life to teaching the promise of a Golden Era, a time on Earth when everyone loves his brother as he loves himself.

At the conclusion of the story, the narrator states that he has found the little girl, and that he will never stop preaching the earthly paradise.

== Themes ==
According to Mikhail Bakhtin The Dream of a Ridiculous Man is "practically a complete encyclopedia of Dostoevsky's most important themes". He describes these themes and Dostoevsky's stylistic means for presenting them as characteristic of the carnivalised genre of Menippean satire. Among such themes are:

- The presentation of an eccentric character in the form of a wise fool. Dostoevsky's major characters always have "something ridiculous" about them, but they are simultaneously highly self-conscious and capable of deep insight into themselves and the world. The Ridiculous Man says "...if there was one person on earth who knew better than anyone that I was a ridiculous man, then that person was I myself..." and when he is transformed by his dream into an unashamed preacher of paradise on earth, he is completely conscious that it is something that can never be realized.
- The theme of a person who is "alone in his knowledge of the truth and is therefore ridiculed by everyone else as a madman", typical of the ancient Menippea and also, in varying degrees, of Dostoevsky's major heroes.
- The theme of "absolute indifference to everything in the world", characteristic of the Menippea of the Cynics and the Stoics, expressed through the Ridiculous Man as the conviction that nothing mattered and that nothing really existed, leading him to the contemplation and eventually the intention of suicide.
- The theme, found in all the major novels, of the final hours before death after a firm intention to kill oneself has been formed. The Ridiculous Man thoughtlessly shuns the little girl because, due to his impending suicide, he already considers himself to be outside of any expectations of ordinary life. This is linked to another fundamental theme of Dostoevsky's work, particularly The Brothers Karamazov: the idea that, in a world where there is no God and no immortality of the soul, everything is permitted. This in turn is linked to the theme of ethical solipsism.
- The dream as a revelatory crisis. In the case of the Ridiculous Man it is a vision through which an entirely new reality for human beings becomes possible. So-called 'real life' was something empty, something he fully intended to snuff out, but his dream revealed to him "another life, a great, renewed and powerful life." On several occasions during the telling of his story, he addresses the question of the imaginary or fantastic nature of dreams, which is used by others as a reason to laugh at him or doubt his 'truth'. But he answers that 'real life' itself is little more than a dream, and that it is of no consequence what the form is, if it is only known, without the slightest doubt, that it is a revelation of the Truth.
- The theme of "utopia" not as an abstract ideal but as a living vision of a living person. The Ridiculous Man saw how an earthly paradise was possible and found far greater power in that vision than in mankind's presumed "natural" state. That vision is enough to transform his intention to kill himself into a determination to devote his life to fighting everything that would prevent the realization of the vision: " 'Consciousness of life is higher than life, knowledge of the laws of happiness is higher than happiness'—that is what we must fight against!"
- An essential quality of this vision, whenever it appears in Dostoevsky's work, is that the transformation is potentially instantaneous. All that is needed is that one must "love others as one loves oneself, that is the main thing, that is all, absolutely nothing more than that is needed, and then one would instantly find a way to build paradise."

== Adaptations ==
The story was adapted into an animated film in 1992 by Aleksandr Petrov.

In 1990, it was adapted by the BBC as a thirty-minute television special, “The Dream”, directed by Norman Stone and starring Jeremy Irons.
