= Martine Chartrand =

Canadian film director

Martine Chartrand (born 1962) is a Haitian Canadian filmmaker, visual artist and teacher. She practices a paint-on-glass animation technique to create her films. Throughout Chartrand's career, she has been involved with numerous films and has made three animated shorts which have been exhibited across Canada and internationally. Her films often deal with social and cultural issues relating to Black culture and Black history.

== Biography ==
=== Early years ===
Born in 1962, Chartrand was adopted and raised in Montreal, Quebec. She graduated from Concordia University with a Bachelor of Fine Arts in 1986 and earned a certificate in Arts Education at UQAM in 1988. After graduating she began making a living by creating poster graphics and giving workshops in exhibitions across Canada and Europe. Before becoming involved in animation, Chartrand worked as a painter and illustrator. In 1986, Chartrand became working as a layout and colour artist. She joined the National Film Board officially as a colour artist, assisting Pierre M. Trudeau during the shooting of Enfantillages (1990). She then collaborated on Jours de plaine (1990), co-directed by Réal Bérard and André Leduc.

=== Professional career ===
Chartrand is frequently invited as a lecturer for conferences, master classes, and art workshops worldwide. She guides artists and shares the techniques involved in creating paint-on-glass animation.

=== Film career ===
In 1992, Chartrand directed her first animated film for the NFB T.V. Tango. A short designed to encourage children to be critical of televised advertising messages and help them understand what they're seeing.

In 1994, Chartrand was given advanced courses in paint-on-glass animation by Alexander Petrov. A painstaking process which involves years of painting thousands of paintings and filming them frame by frame to create a fluid motion.

Produced by the National Film Board of Canada, Black Soul (French: Âme noire) is an animated short directed and written by Martine Chartrand. It is the story of a young boy who explores his cultural heritage through the stories of his grandmother. An emotionally rich and vibrant piece which employs painted glass frames shot with a 35mm camera. Its soundtrack features traditional African rhythms, gospel music by Ranee Lee and a composition by jazz pianist Oliver Jones. Among its achievements, Black Soul won the Golden Bear for Best Short Film at the 51st Berlin International Film Festival.

For 8 years, Chartrand worked steadily on her next film MacPherson. Inspired by a song by famed French-Canadian singer-songwriter Félix Leclerc, MacPherson is a poetic film which combines Quebec folk music with vivid painted imagery.

Chartrand is the subject of the documentary Finding Macpherson (2014), directed by Serge Giguère, which follows the artistic processes she undertook in order to create her short film MacPherson (2012). It also draws parallels between Chartrand and Frank Randolph Macpherson, as she traces her Haitian heritage through the film.

== Artistic style ==
Paint-on-glass animation style involves the manipulation of wet media to create animated films. The artist's paints are moved around the glass which is placed directly under a camera. When filmed frame-by-frame, the images blend and give the illusion of merging and melting into each successive frame. The end result is a fluid sense of movement which creates a painterly effect.

== Filmography ==
=== Short films ===
Year	Title	Role
1992	T.V. Tango	Director, Writer, Animator
2000	Black Soul	Director, Writer, Animator, Cinematographer
2012	Macpherson	Director, Writer, Animator, Cinematographer

== Awards ==
- Special Jury Commendation International Animation Festival, September 30 to October 4, 1992, Ottawa - Canada
- Award for Best Direction Black International Cinema I.U.S.B., May 23, 1993, Berlin - Germany
- Golden Bear - Category: Short Film International Film Festival, February 7 to 18 2001, Berlin - Germany
- Best Animated Short Award International Film Festival, February 27 to March 3, 2002, Santa Barbara - USA
- First Prize (Short Film) Montreal World Film Festival, August 23 to September 3, 2012, Montréal - Canada
