= China Tea Set =

- Russian: Китайскій сервизъ
- Directed by: Vitaly Moskalenko
- Written by: Vitaly Moskalenko
- Produced by: Aleksandr Litvinov
- Starring: Oleg Yankovsky; Sergey Bezrukov; Anna Samokhina; Vladimir Menshov; Sergey Nikonenko
- Cinematography: Yuriy Nevskiy
- Edited by: Svetlana Ivanova
- Music by: Dmitri Smirnov
- Production company: Mosfilm
- Release date: 1999
- Running time: 98 min.
- Country: Russia
- Language: Russian

China Tea Set (Note: Here "china tea set" means china, i.e. porcelain, tableware) (Russian: Китайскій сервизъ, romanized: Kitayskiy serviz) is a 1999 Russian comedy film directed by Vitaly Moskalenko.

== Plot ==
The film takes place in 1913 on a ship leaving the Volga from Tsaritsyn to Nizhny Novgorod to celebrate the 300th anniversary of the Romanov dynasty. Suddenly it became known that con men plan to beat a rich merchant Frol Satanovsky at poker game....

== Cast ==
- Oleg Yankovsky as Count Stroganov
- Sergey Bezrukov as Kolya Sidikhin
- Anna Samokhina as Zinaida Voloshina (singing Evgenia Smolyaninova)
- Vladimir Menshov as Merchant Satanovsky
- Sergey Nikonenko as Arseni Myshko
- Bogdan Stupka as Lapsin
- Sergey Gabrielyan as Staff Captain Panteleimon Sumatokhin
- Irina Bezrukova as Countess (as Irina Livanova)
- Maksim Lagashkin as Waiter
- Andrei Davydov as General
- Yuriy Dumchev as Efrem
- Evgeniya Dmitrieva as Elzhbeta Yanovna Kvyatkovskaya
