= Black Soul =

- French: Âme noire
- Directed by: Martine Chartrand
- Written by: Martine Chartrand
- Produced by: Pierre Hébert; Marcel Jean; Yves Leduc
- Cinematography: Martine Chartrand
- Edited by: Fernand Bélanger
- Music by: Lilison T.S. Cordeiro; Oliver Jones
- Production company: National Film Board of Canada
- Release date: February 12, 2001
- Running time: 10 minutes
- Country: Canada
- Languages: English; French

Black Soul (French: Âme noire) is a 2001 animated short by Haitian Canadian filmmaker Martine Chartrand that uses paint-on-glass animation and music to portray defining moments of Black history.

Produced by the National Film Board of Canada, its soundtrack features traditional African rhythms, gospel music by Ranee Lee and a composition by jazz pianist Oliver Jones. Awards for the film included a Golden Bear for best short film at the Berlin International Film Festival, and the Jutra Award for Best Animated Short Film. It was also included in the Animation Show of Shows.

== Premise ==
It's the middle of winter in Montreal when an old lady sits down with her grandson to explore the trials and tribulations his ancestors and other Black Canadians endured throughout history, with the aid of Jacques Roumain's book Africa, I have kept your Memory. As each page in the book transforms into the next, the boy becomes fully immersed into the story and begins to discover how those events molded their unique culture today.

== Themes ==
The animated film deals with the idea of memory in the ways it explores the existence of slavery in Canada. At the end of the film, just before the credits there is a blurb reading: "In Canada, there were Amerindian and Black Slaves from the XVII to the XIX century". Although some would argue that black slavery in Canada was not significant or widely prevalent, it did exist and the enslavement practiced in Canada was illegal for some time. When it was made into law, its purpose was to help drive the economy but was abolished when proven unfeasible.

The film honours the memories of slaves and fugitives during that time by telling their stories. The boy is often placed in these significant scenes in history so that he can perhaps identify their struggles. Through this experience, he sees the linkage between their triumphs and the opportunities he's afforded, finding the strength within himself to overcome the challenges that may emerge just as his ancestors did before him.

== Production ==
Chartrand utilizes a traditional animation technique known as paint-on-glass animation. It is considered one of the most demanding animation techniques. Chartrand familiarized herself with this technique when directing MacPherson and since mastered. The process involves manipulating wet media on a glass sheet/sheets, that's often placed on a projector for lighting purposes, all under the lens of a camera recording. Oil paint is often used because it dries slowly which allows an artist to work on a project for longer periods of time. The effect of this technique is the illusion of images seamlessly merging from one scene into the next.
