= Encyclopedia of Domestic Animation =

Энциклопедия отечественной мультипликации
- Author: Sergey Kapkov
- Cover artist: Viktor Melamed
- Language: Russian
- Subject: Russian and Soviet animation
- Publisher: Algoritm-kniga
- Publication date: March 2007
- Publication place: Russia
- Pages: 813
- OCLC: 122513943
- LC Class: NC1766.R8 E58 2006

The Encyclopedia of Domestic Animation (Russian: Энциклопедия отечественной мультипликации; transliterated Entsiklopediya otechestvennoy multiplikatsiyi) is a collection of biographies and filmographies of the masters of Russian and Soviet animation. It was released at the 12th Open Russian Festival of Animated Film in March 2007, and its general release happened on March 11. It is the first attempt at recording the complete history of Russian and Soviet animation.

== Synopsis ==
The encyclopedia was written by Sergey Kapkov and compiled with the help of several journalists and editors over the course of a few years. A huge amount of information was gathered from interviews with living members of the profession. This was partly out of necessity because of the destruction of some archives in the post-Soviet period, notably that of Soyuzmultfilm. Letters with requests for help were sent out to all of the former Soviet republics, though in some countries such as Estonia and Georgia they were totally ignored. Because so much information was dependent on oral sources, it was decided not to call it an academic edition. Kapkov said of the book, "we are not insured from some possible mistakes".

== Content ==
The book contains 1050 biographies (each of which contains an exhaustive filmography) of people involved in animation of all sorts of different professions: directors, artists, animators, writers, camera operators, editors, composers, voice actors and critics. It covers the historical period from 1912, when Ladislas Starevich made the first Russian animated film with insect skeletons, to the present day. The introduction, which summarizes this whole history, was written by Larisa Malyukova.

Upon the book's release, many animators (especially from former Soviet republics) contacted the authors and provided additional information about themselves and their colleagues, as well as some factual corrections.

== Reception ==
Because of this and the book's unexpected success at the book fair "Books of Russia" («Книги России»), future updated editions are planned.
