= The Dream (1989 film) =

1989 British television film

The Dream is a 1989 television film directed by Norman Stone and starring Jeremy Irons. It was adapted by Murray Watts from an 1877 short story by Fyodor Dostoyevsky called "The Dream of a Ridiculous Man". Irons is the sole speaking cast member; he is a character simply known as The Man who performs a monologue.
