= Ranee Lee =

Canadian jazz musician (born 1942

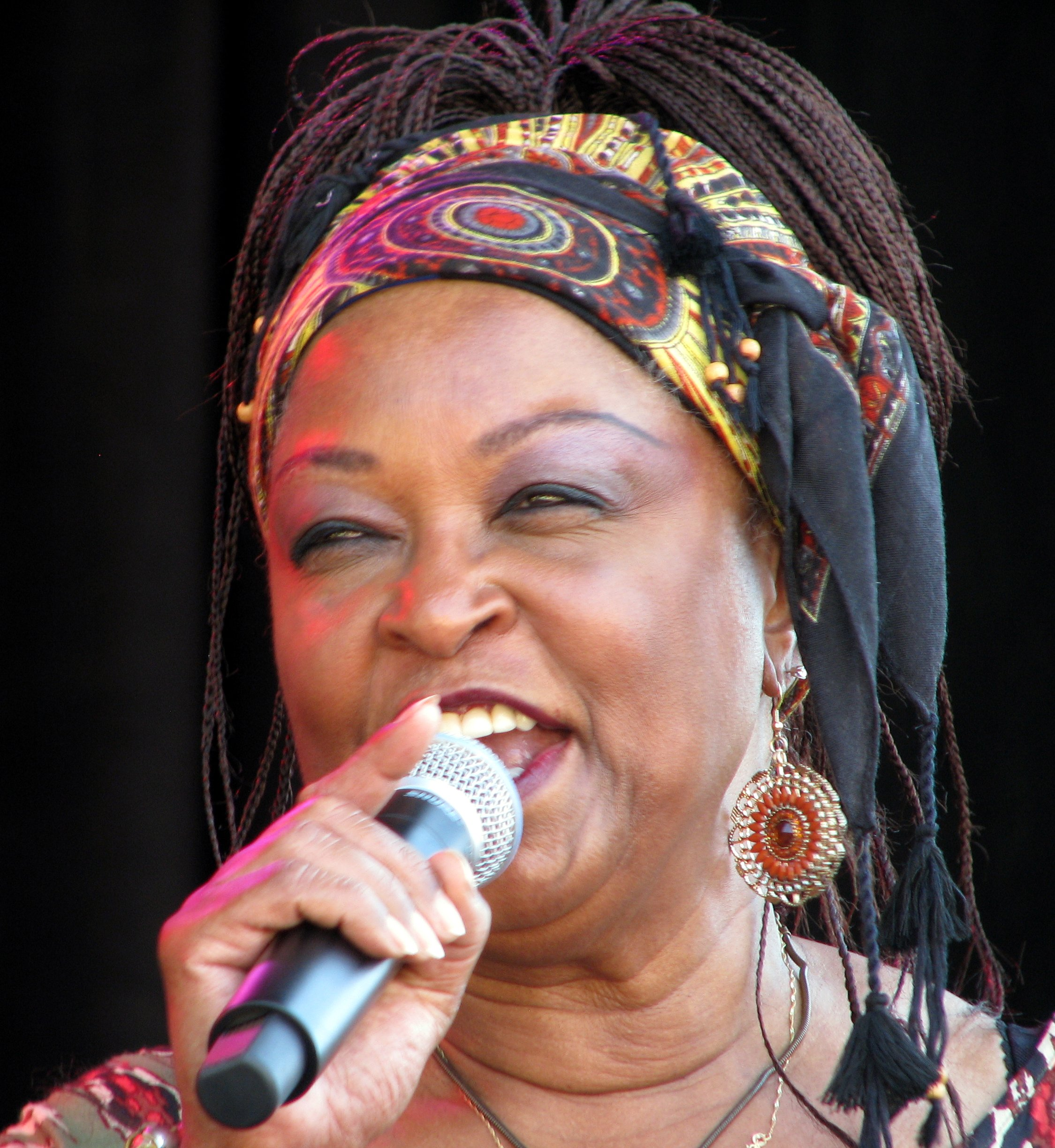

Background information
- Born: Brooklyn, New York, U.S.
- Genres: Vocal jazz, jazz blues, torch songs
- Occupations: Singer, songwriter, jazz drummer, tenor saxophonist
- Instrument: Vocals
- Label: Justin Time
- Website: Ranee Lee, Justin Time Records

Ranee Lee, CM is an American jazz singer and musician who resides in Montreal, Quebec. She is also an actor, author, educator and television host. Referred as “Montreal's Queen of Jazz,” Lee is a Juno Award winner, two-time Top Canadian Female Jazz Vocalist by Jazz Report Magazine and was honored with the International Association of Jazz Educators Awards for her outstanding contribution to jazz music.

== Biography ==
Born in Brooklyn, Lee moved to Montreal at the age of 28 in 1970. She toured North America in the 1970s as a jazz drummer and tenor saxophonist. She subsequently landed a starring role playing Billie Holiday in Lady Day, and won a Dora Mavor Moore Award for her performance. She subsequently began recording as a vocalist, releasing her first album Live at the Bijou in 1984.

She wrote and starred in Dark Divas, The Musical, a tribute to the lives and careers of seven of the most popular female jazz singers of the 20th century: Josephine Baker, Billie Holiday, Pearl Bailey, Lena Horne, Dinah Washington, Ella Fitzgerald, and Sarah Vaughan.

Her music appears in the animated short film Black Soul (2000).

She is also a children's book writer (author of Nana, What Do You Say?); an educator, long associated with the University of Laval in Quebec City and the Schulich School of Music of McGill University; and she hosted the television series The Performers.

== Honors and awards ==
Martin Luther King Jr. Achievement Award in 1988 for her musical and actorial achievements. Lee was named a member of the Order of Canada in 2006. She received the International Association of Jazz Educators award in 2004 and 2008. She won a 2010 Juno Award for her album Ranee Lee – Lives Upstairs.

== Discography ==
- All Grown Up (RCA Victor, 1980)
- Live at Le Bijou (Justin Time, 1984)
- Deep Song: a tribute to Billie Holiday with Oliver Jones (Justin Time, 1989)
- The Musicals: Jazz on Broadway (Justin Time, 1992)
- I Thought About You (Justin Time, 1994)
- You Must Believe in Swing (Justin Time, 1996)
- Seasons of Love (Justin Time, 1997)
- Presents Dark Divas (Justin Time, 2000)
- Maple Groove: Songs from the Great Canadian Songbook (Justin Time, 2003)
- Just You, Just Me with Oliver Jones (Justin Time, 2005)
- Lives Upstairs (Justin Time, 2009)
- A Celebration in Time with Oliver Jones, (Justin Time, 2010)
- What's Going On (Justin Time, 2014)
