= 12th Open Russian Festival of Animated Film =

The 12th Open Russian Festival of Animated Film was held from March 1–5, 2007, in Suzdal, Russia. The winners for the main award categories were announced on March 4. The jury consisted of 33 professionals in professions related to animation. The Encyclopedia of Domestic Animation, the first attempt to cover the full history of Russian and Soviet animation, was premiered at the festival.

== Main awards ==
Award	Film	Recipient(s) (the director of the film, unless stated otherwise)	Links
Grand Prix	My Love; Моя любовь (Moya lyubov)	n/a	My Love on Animator.ru; Clips: ,,
Best Direction	My Love; Моя любовь (Moya lyubov)	Aleksandr Petrov; Александр Петров	
Best Dramaturgy	Lavatory – Lovestory; Уборная история - Любовная история (Ubornaya istoriya - Lyubovnaya istoriya)	Konstantin Bronzit; Константин Бронзит	animator.ru
Best Visuals	My Love; Моя любовь (Moya lyubov)	Aleksandr Petrov; Александр Петров	
Best Animation	The Snow Maiden; Снегурочка (Snegurochka)	Mariya Muat; Мария Муат	animator.ru
Best Sound	Mother and Music; Мать и музыка (Mat i muzyka)	Yuliya Aronova; Юлия Аронова; L. Slepner (composer); Л. Слепнер; N. Kozyrev (sound operator); Н. Козырев	animator.ru
Best Film for Children	Zhiharka; Жихарка	Oleg Uzhinov; Олег Ужинов	animator.ru Rambler (full film)
Best Student Film	The King Forgets; Король забывает (Korol zabyvayet)	Dmitriy Shestopalov, Veronice Fyodorova; Дмитрий Шестопалов, Вероника Фёдорова	animator.ru Corbina (full film, 5th from the top)
Best Interstitial Animation	Right Turn	Dmitriy Rezchikov; Дмитрий Резчиков	animator.ru Rambler (full film)

== Other prizes ==
Award	Film	Recipient(s) (the director of the film, unless stated otherwise)	Link(s)
"Fortuna" Prize (chosen randomly)	The Magic Bench; Волшебная лавка (Volshebnaya lavka)	Yelena Petkevich; Елена Петкевич	animator.ru
Administration of Petushinsky District Prize	Bear Stories; Медвежьи истории (Medvezhyi istoriyi)	Marina Karpova; Марина Карпова	animator.ru
Prize of Audience Sympathies (viewers from Rambler Vision)	Zhiharka; Жихарка	Oleg Uzhinov; Олег Ужинов	
Vyacheslav Mayasov Prize - for the development of the Suzdal Festival	n/a	Vladimir Golovanov (dramaturgist); Владимир Голованов	animator.ru

== Jury rating ==
Each jury member was asked to list their top five films of the festival. Five points were given for a 1st place vote and so on, down to one point for a 5th place vote.

Position	Film	Points	Link
1	My Love; Моя любовь (Moya lyubov)	110	
2	Zhiharka; Жихарка	80	
3	Lavatory Lovestory; Уборная история - Любовная история (Ubornaya istoriya - Lyubovnaya istoriya)	59	
4	Foolish Girl; Девочка дура (Devochka dura)	42	
5	The King Forgets; Король забывает (Korol zabyvayet)	34	
6	Kolobok; Колобок	30	
7	Once There Lived a Secretary of Defence; Жил министр обороны (Zhil ministr oborony)	22	
8	Bear Stories; Медвежьи истории (Medvezhyi istroriyi)	19	
9	The Snow Maiden; Снегурочка (Snegurochka)	17	
10	Mother and Music; Мать и музыка (Mat i muzyka)	15	
11	Little Havroshechka (Mikhaylova); Крошечка Хаврошечка (Kroshechka khavroshechka)	9	
12	The Little Fish; Рыбка (Rybka)	9	
13	Tales of an Old Piano; Сказки старого пианино (Skazki starovo pianino)	8	
14	Little Havroshechka (Korzhnyova); Крошечка Хаврошечка (Kroshechka khavroshechka)	8	
15	Masquerade; Маскарад (Maskarad)	6	
16	Sarah's Tale; Сказка Сары (Skazka Sary)	5	
17	Cuban Lullaby; Кубинская колыбельная (Kubinskaya kolybelnaya)	4	
18	About the Bald Princess; Про лысую принцессу (Pro lysuyu printsessu)	4	
19	The Wielder of the Winged Hands; Рукокрылый (Rukokrylyy)	3	
20	Heart of the Beast; Сердце зверя (Serdtse zverya)	3	
21	Ryaba; Ряба	3	
22	Fantasia About a Dead Man to the Music of Beethoven; Фантазия о мёртвом человеке на музыку Бетховена (Fantaziya o myortvom cheloveke na muzyku Betkhovena)	2	
23	The Magic Booth; Волшебная лавка (Volshebnaya lavka)	1	
24	Unbendable Chen; Несгибаямый Чен (Nesgibayemyy Chen)	1	
