= 2nd Open Russian Festival of Animated Films =

Open Russian Festival of Animated Film
- Date: 1997
- Location: Tarusa
- Country: Russia
- Website: http://www.suzdalfest.ru

The 2nd Open Russian Festival of Animated Films was held in 1997 at a boarding house called "Birch Grove" near the town of Tarusa, Russia. Animated works from the past three years in the Russian Federation were accepted.

The prizes were handed out according to profession, and any member or guest of the festival was able to vote for their favourite film.

Despite the growing economic crisis in the country, it marked an artistic high point in the Russian animation field in the 1990s, and the high quality of the films attracted the attention of the national mainstream media.

== Jury ==
English	Profession(s)
Fyodor Khitruk	director, animator
Nikolai Izvolov	cinematologist, film historian
Eduard Nazarov	director, artist, animator
Yuriy Norshteyn	director, artist, animator, teacher
Aleksandr Florenskiy	artist

== Prizes of the Jury ==
Award	Recipient(s)	Film(s)	Links
Best Direction (shared)	Mikhail Aldashin; Михаил Алдашин	The Nativity; Рождество (Rozhdestvo)	
Best Direction (shared)	Yuriy Cherenkov; Юрий Черенков	The Great Migration; Большая миграция (Bolshaya migratsiya)	
Best Scenario	Nadezhda Kuzhushanaya; Надежда Кожушаная	Grandmother; Бабушка (Babushka); The Pink Doll; Розовая кукла (Rozovaya kukla)	,
Best Art Direction	Zoya Trofimova; Зоя Трофимова	The Nativity; Рождество (Rozhdestvo)	
Best Animator of a Drawn Film	Aleksandr Petrov; Александр Петров	The Mermaid; Русалка (Rusalka)	
Best Animator of a Puppet Film	Olga Panokina; Ольга Панокина	Abraham; Авраам (Avraam); Joseph; Иосиф (Iosif)	,
Best Camera Operator	Aleksandr Vikhanskiy; Александр Виханский	Abraham; Авраам (Avraam)	
Best Character	Igor Oleynikov; Игорь Олейников for the character "Iona"	Iona; Иона	
Best Debut	Andrey Zolotukhin; Андрей Золотухин	Grandmother; Бабушка (Babushka)	
"Breakthrough" Prize	Valentin Olshvang	The Pink Doll; Розовая кукла (Rozovaya kukla)	
Best Commercial	Andrey Karpenko	The Dragonfly; Стрекоза (Strekoza); The Sausage is Late; Колбаса опаздывает (Kolbasa opazdyvayet)	,

== Rating (by audience vote) ==
Position	Film	Director	Points
1	The Nativity; Рождество (Rozhdestvo)	Mikhail Aldashin	433
2	The Great Migration; Большая миграция (Bolshaya migratsiya)	Yuriy Cherenkov	323
3	The Mermaid; Русалка (Rusalka)	Aleksandr Petrov	228
4	The Pink Doll; Розовая кукла (Rozovaya kukla)	Valentin Olshvang	218
5	Grandmother; Бабушка (Babushka)	Andrey Zolotukhin	128
6	Joseph; Иосиф (Iosif)	Aida Zyablikova	121
7	The Song About Unrequited Love to the Motherland; Песня о безответной любви к родине (Pesnya o bezotvetnoy lyubvi k rodine)	?	50
8	Kings and Cabbage; Короли и капуста (Koroli i kapusta)	Mariya Muat	46
9	The Pilot Brothers Cook Macaroni; Братья Пилоты готовят макарончики (Bratya Piloty gotovyat makaronchiki)	Aleksandr Tatarskiy	44
10	The Life of a Grey Bear; Жизнь серого медведя (Zhizn serovo medvedya)	Eduard Belyayev	31
