= Paint-on-glass animation =

Animation technique

Aleksandr Petrov's 1999 The Old Man and the Sea (Academy Award for Animated Short Film)

Paint-on-glass animation is a technique for making animated films by manipulating slow-drying oil paints on sheets of glass. Gouache mixed with glycerine is sometimes used instead. The best-known practitioner of the technique is Russian animator Aleksandr Petrov; he has used it in seven films, all of which have won awards.

== Animators and films ==
- Agamurad Amanov (Агамурад Аманов)
  - Tuzik (Тузик) (2001)
  - Childhood's Autumn, Осень детства (Osen detstva) (2005) (with Yekatirina Boykova)
- Martine Chartrand
  - Black Soul (2000)
- Witold Giersz
  - Little Western (Mały Western) (1960)
  - Red and Black (Czerwone i czarne) (1963)
  - Horse (Koń) (1967)
  - The Stuntman (Kaskader) (1972)
  - Fire (Pożar) (1975)
- Aleksey Karayev (Алексей Караев)
  - Welcome, Добро пожаловать (Dobro pozhalovat) (1986)
  - The Lodgers of an Old House, Жильцы старого дома (Zhiltsy starovo doma) (1987)
  - I Can Hear You, Я вас слышу (Ya vas slyshu) (1992)
- Caroline Leaf
  - The Street (1976)
- Marcos Magalhães
  - Animando (1987) (partially; instructive film)
- Miyo Sato
  - Fox Fears (2016)
  - Mob Psycho 100 (2016, 2018)
- Natalya Orlova (Наталья Орлова)
  - Hamlet (1992)
  - King Richard III (1994)
  - Moby Dick, Моби Дик (1999)
- Aleksandr Petrov (Александр Петров) (was art director on Karayev's Welcome in 1986)
  - The Cow, Корова (Korova) (1989)
  - The Dream of a Ridiculous Man, Сон смешного человека (Son smeshnovo cheloveka) (1992)
  - The Mermaid, Русалка (Rusalka) (1997)
  - The Old Man and the Sea (1999)
  - Winter Days, 冬の日 (Fuyu no hi) (2003) (segment)
  - My Love, Моя любовь (Moya lyubov) (2006)
- Georges Schwizgebel
  - The Man With No Shadow, (L'homme sans ombre) (2004)
  - Retouches, (Retouches) (2008)
- Vladimir Samsonov
  - The Winter, Зима (Zima) (1979)
  - Brightness, Блики (Bliki) (1981)
  - Contrasts, Контрасты (Kontrasty) (1981)
  - Contours, Контуры (Kontury) (1981)
  - Masquerade, Маскарад (Maskarad) (1981)
  - Still Life, Натюрморт (Natyurmort) (1981)
  - Restoration, Реставрация (Restavratsiya) (1981)
  - The Little Sun, Солнышко (Solnyshko) (1981)
  - The Snail, Улитка (Ulitka) (1981)
  - Magic Trick, Фокус (Fokus) (1981)
  - Coloured Music, Цветомузыка (Tsvetomuzyka) (1981)
  - The Bumblebee, Шмель (Shmel) (1981)
  - Mood, Настроение (Nastroyeniye) (1982)
  - The Landscape, Пейзаж (Peyzazh) (1982)
  - Rendez-Vous, Свидание (Svidaniye) (1982)
  - The Magpie, Сорока (Soroka) (1982)
  - The Motif, Мотив (Motiv) (1984)
  - Waiting for..., Ожидание (Ozhidaniye) (1984)
  - Miniatures, Миниатюры (Miniatyury) (1985)
  - Miniatures - 86, Миниатюры - 86 (Miniatyury - 86) (1986)
- Olive Jar Studios
  - MTV: Greetings From The World (1988)
- Boris Stepantsev
  - The Song About the Falcon, Песня о соколе (Pesnya o sokole) (1967)
- Wendy Tilby
  - Strings (1991)
- Karel Zeman
  - Inspiration (Inspirace) (1949)

== See also ==
- Animation techniques
- Painting
