= Finding Macpherson =

2014 Canadian documentary film

- French: Le mystère Macpherson
- Directed by: Serge Giguère
- Written by: Serge Giguère
- Produced by: Nicole Hubert; Colette Loumède; Sylvie Van Brabant
- Starring: Martine Chartrand
- Cinematography: Serge Giguère
- Edited by: Annie Jean
- Music by: Bertrand Chénier
- Production company: Production du Rapide Blanc
- Distributed by: National Film Board of Canada
- Release date: March 24, 2014
- Running time: 77 minutes
- Country: Canada
- Language: French

Finding Macpherson (French: Le mystère Macpherson) is a Canadian documentary film, directed by Serge Giguère and released in 2014. The film centres on animator Martine Chartrand's complex eight-year process of making her 2011 short film Macpherson, including her research into the life of Frank Randolph MacPherson, the Jamaican immigrant to Canada who had inspired Félix Leclerc's song "Macpherson".

The film won the Prix Jutra for Best Documentary Film at the 17th Jutra Awards in 2015.
