= Message to Man =

Film festival in Saint Petersburg, Russia

Message to Man International Film Festival
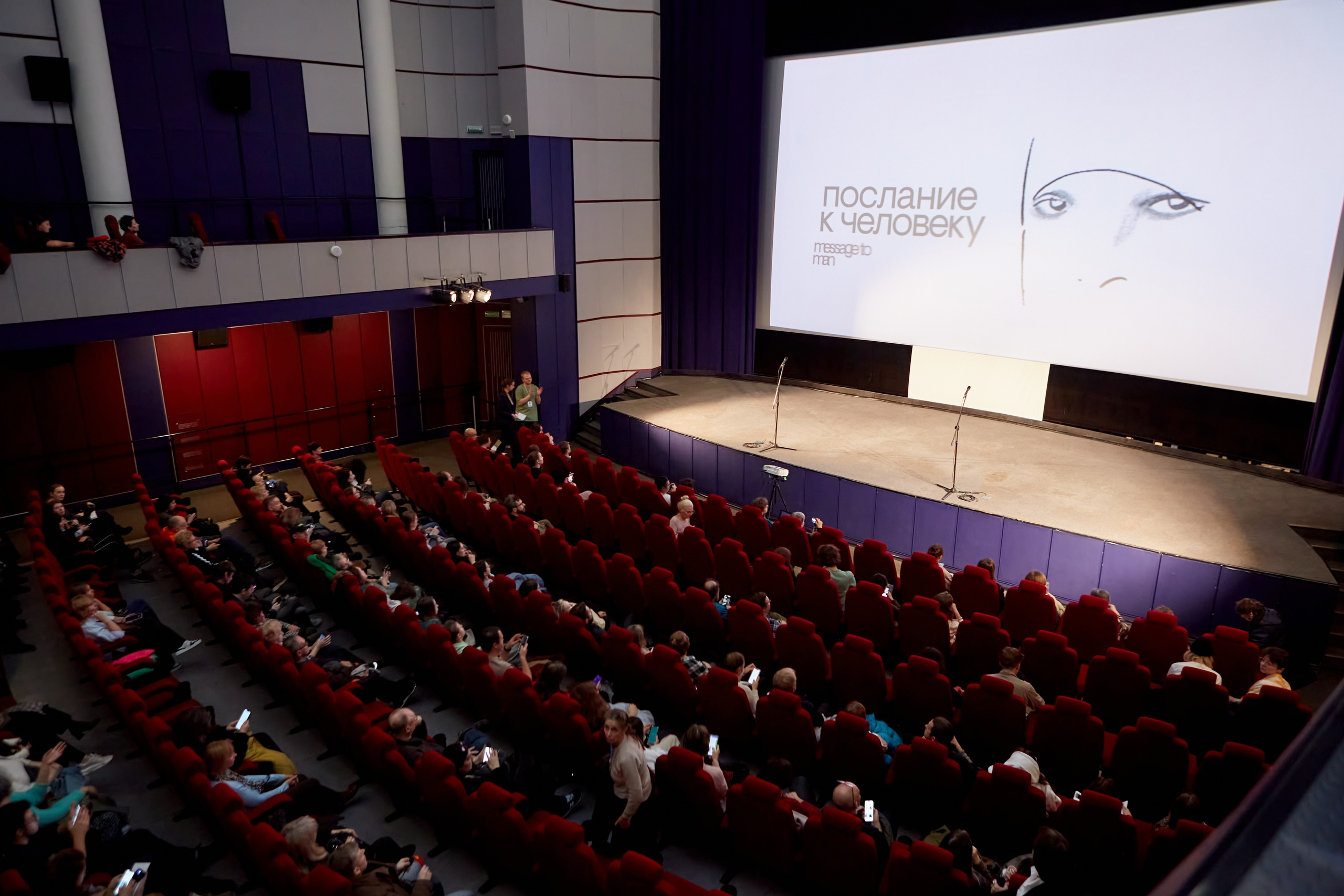
- Location: Saint Petersburg, Russa
- Founded: 16 January 1988; 38 years ago (as International Film Festival)
- Awards: Golden Centaur Grand Prix, Centaur Prize, Jury Prize
- Artistic director: Alexei Uchitel
- Website: https://message2man.com/en/

Message to Man International Film Festival (Russian: Послание к Человеку, Poslaniye k Chelovyeku) is an international competitive documentary, short and animated film festival held annually in Saint Petersburg, Russia. It's the oldest film festival in St. Petersburg and one of the three oldest film festivals in Russia.

Message to Man originated in the USSR in 1988 as a biennale documentary film festival. The organising committee was headed by the chairman of the Leningrad Executive Committee. Since its foundation, the festival has received financial and organisational support from the Russian (formerly USSR) State Cinematography Committee, the Russian Ministry of Culture and its cinema department, and the St. Petersburg Government and its Committee for Culture. Recently this list has been supplemented by the Federal Foundation for the Social and Economic Support of National Cinematography. The festival has received accreditation from the International Federation of Film Producers Associations (FIAPF), France.

The name of the festival is a reference to the universal humanist values promoted in the Bible. The emblem of the festival and its prize is based on The Infant Centaur, a drawing by Nadya Rusheva.

== History and concept ==
The festival was created in accordance with Resolution No. 29 of the USSR Council of Ministers, dated 16 January 1989:

"The USSR State Committee for Cinematography, the USSR State Committee for Radio Broadcasting and Television and the Union of Cinematographers of the USSR organize the Leningrad International Film Festival of Non-Fiction Cinema Message to Man... in order to promote contacts and exchange of ideas between cinematographers from different countries who develop in their work the themes of goodness, social justice and peace."

It was founded by Mikhail Litvyakov, who is now the Honorary President of the Festival. Since 2010, Alexey Uchitel, director of documentary and feature films, People's Artist of Russia, is the President of the Festival.

== Programmes ==
INTERNATIONAL COMPETITION

• Full-length documentary films (from 40 to 120 minutes)

• Short documentary films (up to 40 minutes)

• Short and animated films (no longer than 30 minutes)

NATIONAL COMPETITION OF DOCUMENTARY FILMS

• Documentary films (no longer than 120 minutes)

IN SILICO INTERNATIONAL COMPETITION OF EXPERIMENTAL FILMS

• Short experimental films (no longer than 15 minutes)

SPECIAL PROGRAMMES

Special programmes are established and compiled by the Organising Committee of the Festival. The number of special programmes for each year is determined based on the Festival's current needs and capabilities. As part of the film festival, various exhibitions, theatrical and musical performances, meetings, and workshops which provide an opportunity to screen feature films outside the competitions, as well as other cultural events that are an integral part of the Festival's programme are held.

OPENING AND CLOSING FILMS

At one time, the opening and closing movies were: The Apprentice, All We Imagine as Light, The Book of Solutions, Vacation, Grand Marin, Big Snakes of Ulli-Kale, Balabanov. Belltower. Requiem, Everything Went Fine, Playback, Final Cut – Ladies & Gentlemen, Youth, Aquarela, Man with a Movie Camera, A Gentle Creature, Lo and Behold, Reveries of the Connected World, The Unknown Girl, Human, Francofonia, Two Days, One Night, The Salt of the Earth, An Episode in the Life of an Iron Picker, The Dance of Reality, The Traitor, etc.

== Guests and participants ==
Over the years, the following filmmakers, philosophers, actors and journalists have participated or served as members of the jury: Agnes Varda, Isabelle Huppert, Werner Herzog, Emir Kusturica, Leni Riefenstahl, Paolo Sorrentino, Sergei Loznitsa, Alexander Rogozhkin, Konstantin Bronzit, Sergei Dvortsevoy, Alexander Rodnyansky, Pavel Kostomarov, Kira Muratova, Alexander Sokurov, Victor Kossakovsky, Erwin Leiser, Tonino Guerra, Merab Mamardashvili, Ulrich Seidl, Frederick Wiseman, Eric Roberts, Claude Lanzmann, Fanny Ardant, Zbigniew Rybczyński, Ulrich Gregor, Vadim Abdrashitov, Leo Hurwicz and many others.

The arrival of 98-year-old Leni Riefenstahl during the 11th festival (2001) became a real sensation. She participated in the special program Documentary Cinema in Totalitarian States (screenings of her films and Dziga Vertov's pictures). The visit gave rise to heated debates in society: some screenings were cancelled, but Message to Man IFF stand strong and defended the most crucial one — in Dom Kino cinema center, one of the most important point of attraction of all cinephiles in St. Petersburg.

== Winners of the Golden Centaur Grand Prix ==
Festival	Year	Best Film
I festival	1989	Vstrechny Isk dir. Arkady Ruderman, Yury Khaschevatsky, USSR
II festival	1991	DMB-91 dir. Alexei Khanyutin, USSR
III festival	1993	Belovy dir. Victor Kossakovsky, Russia
IV festival	1994	Marsh Zhivykh dir. Alexander Rodnyansky, Ukraine
V festival	1995	Mother Dao the Turtlelike dir. Vincent Monnikendam, The Netherlands
VI festival	1996	Lev s Sedoi Borodoi dir. Andrei Khrzhanovsky, Russia
VII festival	1997	Chyorny Pepel dir. Shukhrat Makhmudov, Uzbekistan
VIII festival	1998	Khlebny Den dir. Sergei Dvortsevoy, Russia
IX festival	1999	Life in Fog dir. Bahman Ghobadi, Iran
X festival	2000	Inside-Out dir. Tom Guard, Charles Guard, UK
XI festival	2001	No Grand Prix was awarded.
XII festival	2002	Alexei and the Spring dir. Seiichi Motohashi, Japan; Window of the Soul dir. Joao Jardim, Brazil
XIII festival	2003	The Love Zone dir. Arkady Morozov, Russia
XIV festival	2004	Shortage of Space dir. Geir Henning Hopland, Norway
XV festival	2005	Fata Morgana dir. Anastasia Lapsui, Markku Lemuskallio, Finland
XVI festival	2006	Sisters in Law dir. Kim Longinotto, Florence Ayisi, UK
XVII festival	2007	My Love dir. Alexander Petrov, Russia
XVIII festival	2008	How I Am dir. Ingrid Demetz, Caroline Leitner, Italy
XIX festival	2009	Carmen Meets Borat dir. Mercedes Stalenhoef, The Netherlands
XX festival	2010	Draft dir. Timofei Zhalnin, Russia
XXI festival	2011	How Are You Doing, Rudolf Ming? dir. Roberts Rubins, Latvia
XXII festival	2012	The Last Bus dir. Martin Snopek, Ivana Laucíková, Slovakia
XXIII festival	2013	As She Left dir. Alexandra Kandy Longuet, Belgium
XXIV festival	2014	Forest of the Dancing Spirits dir. Linda Västrik, Sweden/Canada
XXV festival	2015	Call Me Marianna dir. Karolina Bielawska, Poland
XXVI festival	2016	Depth Two dir. Ognjen Glavonic, Serbia/France
XXXII festival	2017	Harmony dir. Lidia Sheinin, Russia
XXXIII festival	2018	A woman captured dir. Bernadett Tuza‐Ritter, Hungary/Germany
XXIX festival	2019	Midnight Family dir. Luke Lorentzen, USA/Mexico
XXX festival	2020	Just a guy dir. Shoko Hara, Germany
XXXI festival	2021	Babi Yar. Context, dir. Sergey Loznitsa, Ukraine/Netherlands
XXXII festival	2022	Where Are We Headed dir. Ruslan Fedotov, Belarus/Russia
XXXIII festival	2023	Will My Parents Come to See Me? dir. Mo Harawe, Austria/Germany/Somalia
XXXIV festival	2024	Obscure Night — Goodbye Here, Anywhere dir. Sylvain George, France/Switzerland
