= Sad Detective =

Russian novella

The Sad Detective (Russian: Печальный Детектив) is a novella by Russian author Viktor Astafyev. It was firstly published in the January 1986 issue of Oktyabr magazine. The book tells the story of urban life during the era of stagnation in the Soviet Union as seen by the protagonist, Russian policeman Soshnin. The main topics of Sad Detective are criminality and deprivation of human beings. The setting is in two imaginary towns: Veysk and Khaylovsk. The work was written between 1982 and 1985, and published in 1986 at the beginning of Perestroika. Upon its release, the novella saw a mixed critical reception. Some critics praised Astafyev's piece for showing a realistic picture of urban life in the Soviet Union in the 1980s, while many accused the author of anti-intellectualism. The Encyclopædia Britannica characterises the novel as "a gruesome look at the alcoholism, violence, and animosity among Soviet people.″
