= Boris Leven =

Russian art director

- Born: 13 August 1908; Moscow, Russian Empire
- Died: 11 October 1986 (aged 78); Los Angeles, California, U.S.
- Occupations: Art director, production designer
- Years active: 1938−1986

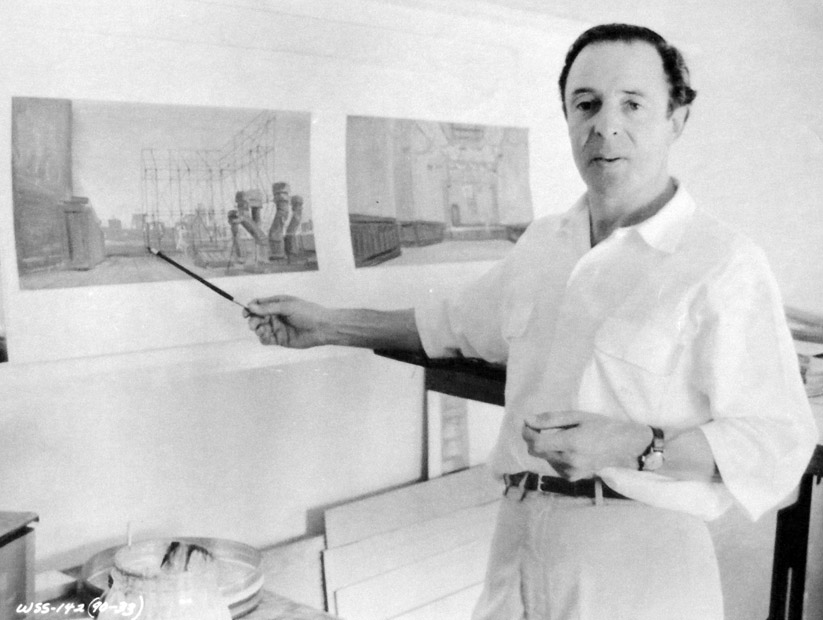
Boris Leven was the production designer of West Side Story (1961). He and Victor A. Gangelin won the Academy Award for Best Art Direction – Set Decoration (Color) for the film.

Boris Leven (in early film credits – Boris Levin; August 13, 1908 – October 11, 1986) was a Russian-born Academy Award-winning art director and production designer whose Hollywood career spanned fifty-three years.

Born in Moscow in the family of Israel and Zinaida (Narkirier) Leven, Leven emigrated to the United States in 1927 and became a naturalized citizen in 1938. After receiving a Bachelor of Arts in architecture from the University of Southern California, he attended the Beaux-Arts Institute of Design in New York City.

A film crew at work on the set of Giant (1956). The Victorian home Leven designed became an iconic image for the film.

Leven began his film career as a sketch artist at Paramount Pictures in 1933 and joined 20th Century Fox three years later. His first screen credit was as the art director for Alexander's Ragtime Band (1938), for which he received the first of nine Oscar nominations.

The designs Leven created ranged from realistic to highly stylised. For Giant (1956), he constructed the Victorian home that sits isolated in a wide expanse of open field, which became an iconic image for the film. His work for West Side Story (1961), which won him the Academy Award for Best Color Art Direction, included actual New York City locations combined with a tenement rooftop and fire escape, inspired by the more abstract stage production, that were built on a soundstage. For New York, New York (1977), he created a fantasized version of Manhattan set in the 1940s.

As an art director, Leven contributed to The Flying Deuces (1939), Hello Frisco, Hello (1943), Invaders from Mars (1953), The Silver Chalice (1954), and Jonathan Livingston Seagull (1973), among others. His credits as production designer include Donovan's Brain (1953), Anatomy of a Murder (1959), Two for the Seesaw (1962), The Sound of Music (1965), The Sand Pebbles (1966), Star! (1968), The Andromeda Strain (1971), Mandingo (1975), The Last Waltz (1978), The King of Comedy (1982), Fletch (1985) and The Color of Money (1986).

Leven married Vera Glooshkoff on February 8, 1946. He died in Los Angeles, California. Vera Leven died at the age of 101 in June 2011. Prior to her death, she had donated several of Boris Leven's paintings and film drawings to the University of Southern California and New York City's Museum of Modern Art.

== See also ==
- Art Directors Guild Hall of Fame
