= The Dream of a Ridiculous Man (film) =

- Directed by: Aleksandr Petrov
- Screenplay by: Aleksandr Petrov
- Based on: "The Dream of a Ridiculous Man" by Fyodor Dostoyevsky
- Cinematography: Sergey Reshetnikov
- Edited by: Lyudmila Putyatina
- Music by: Aleksandr Raskatov
- Release date: 1992
- Running time: 20 minutes
- Country: Russia

The Dream of a Ridiculous Man (Russian: Сон смешного человека Son smeshnovo cheloveka) is a 1992 Russian animated short film directed by Aleksandr Petrov. It tells the story of a misanthropic man who begins to regain his will to live after a chance encounter with a young girl. The film was made using paint-on-glass animation. It is based on the 1877 short story with the same title by Fyodor Dostoyevsky.

The film won several festival awards including the prize for best film in its length category at the 1992 Ottawa International Animation Festival. It was nominated for the Nika Award for Best Animated Film.
