= My Love (2006 film) =

- Poster for the Japanese release by Studio Ghibli, featuring a cropped version of a scene from the film.
- Directed by: Aleksandr Petrov
- Written by: Ivan Shmelyov; Aleksandr Petrov
- Release dates: August 27, 2006 (Hiroshima); March 2, 2007 (Russia)
- Running time: 26 minutes
- Country: Russia
- Language: Russian

My Love (Russian: Моя любовь, Moya lyubov) is a 2006 paint-on-glass-animated short film directed by Aleksandr Petrov, based on A Love Story (1927) by Ivan Shmelyov. Work on the film took place in Yaroslavl, Russia over a period of three years at the studio DAGO Co. It was funded by Russia's Channel One and Dentsu Tec in Japan.

== Crew ==
	English	Russian
Director	Aleksandr Petrov	Александр Петров
Scenario	Aleksandr Petrov	Александр Петров
Animators	Aleksandr Petrov; Dmitri Petrov; Mikhail Tumelya; Isolda Solodova	Александр Петров; Дмитрий Петров; Михаил Тумеля; Изольда Солодова
Cameraman	Sergei Reshetnikov	Сергей Решетников
Sound operator	Viktor Duritsyn	Виктор Дурицын

== History ==
Some time after the completion of the Oscar-winning The Old Man and the Sea (1999), Petrov returned to his hometown of Yaroslavl in Russia to work on his next film. My Love was finished in spring 2006 after three years' work and had its première at the Hiroshima International Animation Festival on August 27, where it won the Audience Prize and the Special International Jury Prize. On March 17, 2007, My Love was theatrically released at the Cinema Angelika in Shibuya (Japan) by Studio Ghibli, as the first release of the Ghibli Museum Library (theatrical and DVD releases of Western animated films in Japan).

In January 2007, Petrov announced that the film would eventually be released in theatres in Russia, combined with his other short films.

== Artistic style and technique ==
The film's style is similar to that used in Petrov's other films and can be characterized as a type of Romantic realism. People and landscapes are painted and animated in a very realistic fashion, but there are sections where Petrov attempts to visually show a character's inner thoughts and dreams.

Because of Petrov's insistence on accuracy, especially where human emotions were concerned, about 20% of the film was made with a technique similar to rotoscoping.

== Critical reaction ==
My Love has gathered many top awards at film festivals, and was called the "undoubted leader of the festival" at the 12th Open Russian Festival of Animated Film (Russia's most important domestic animation festival). The Japan Media Arts Festival jury called it "indisputably a masterpiece" and at the International Leipzig Festival for Documentary and Animated Film, it was called an "exquisite impressionist vision with a very poetic narrative and profound psychology".

At the same time, it has faced criticism from some of Petrov's colleagues, including Ivan Maximov and Yuri Norstein, who have accused it of putting technical achievement ahead of true artistry. Mikhail Tumelya, who accepted the awards at the 12th ORFAF for Petrov (who was not able to come either on account of illness, or because of worry about the audience reaction to his film), summed up the criticism in the following words, attributed to a Buddhist monk: "there are more interesting things in the world than banal perfection".

My Love was noticeably snubbed at the Annecy International Animated Film Festival, receiving no awards despite being one of the "flagship" films. Some of the heaviest criticism has come from Chris Robinson, artistic director of the Ottawa International Animation Festival, who accused Petrov of wasting his talent on "trite, sentimental stories" and thanked him for not sending the film to Ottawa.

== Awards ==
- 2006—11th Hiroshima International Animation Festival: "Audience Prize" and "Special International Jury Prize"
- 2006—International Leipzig Festival for Documentary and Animated Film: "FIPRESCI Prize for Best Animation"
- 2006—10th Japan Media Arts Festival: "Excellence Prize"
- 2007—12th Open Russian Festival of Animated Film: "Grand Prix", "Best Direction" and "Best Visuals"
- 2007—Zolotoy Vityaz: "Best Animated Film"
- 2007—XVII International "Message to Man" Film Festival: "Grand Prix" (Golden Centaur)
- 2007—Melbourne International Animation Festival: "Grand Jury Prize for Best Film", "Jury & Audience Vote" in the program "Hand Painted Panorama"
- 2007—Anima Mundi: Professional Jury Award for "Best Animation"
- 2008—80th Academy Awards:Best Animated Short Film - nomination

It was also included in the Animation Show of Shows in 2006.

== See also ==
- History of Russian animation
