= Evgenia Smolyaninova =

Russian singer (born 1964)

Evgenia Smolyaninova Евгения Смольянинова
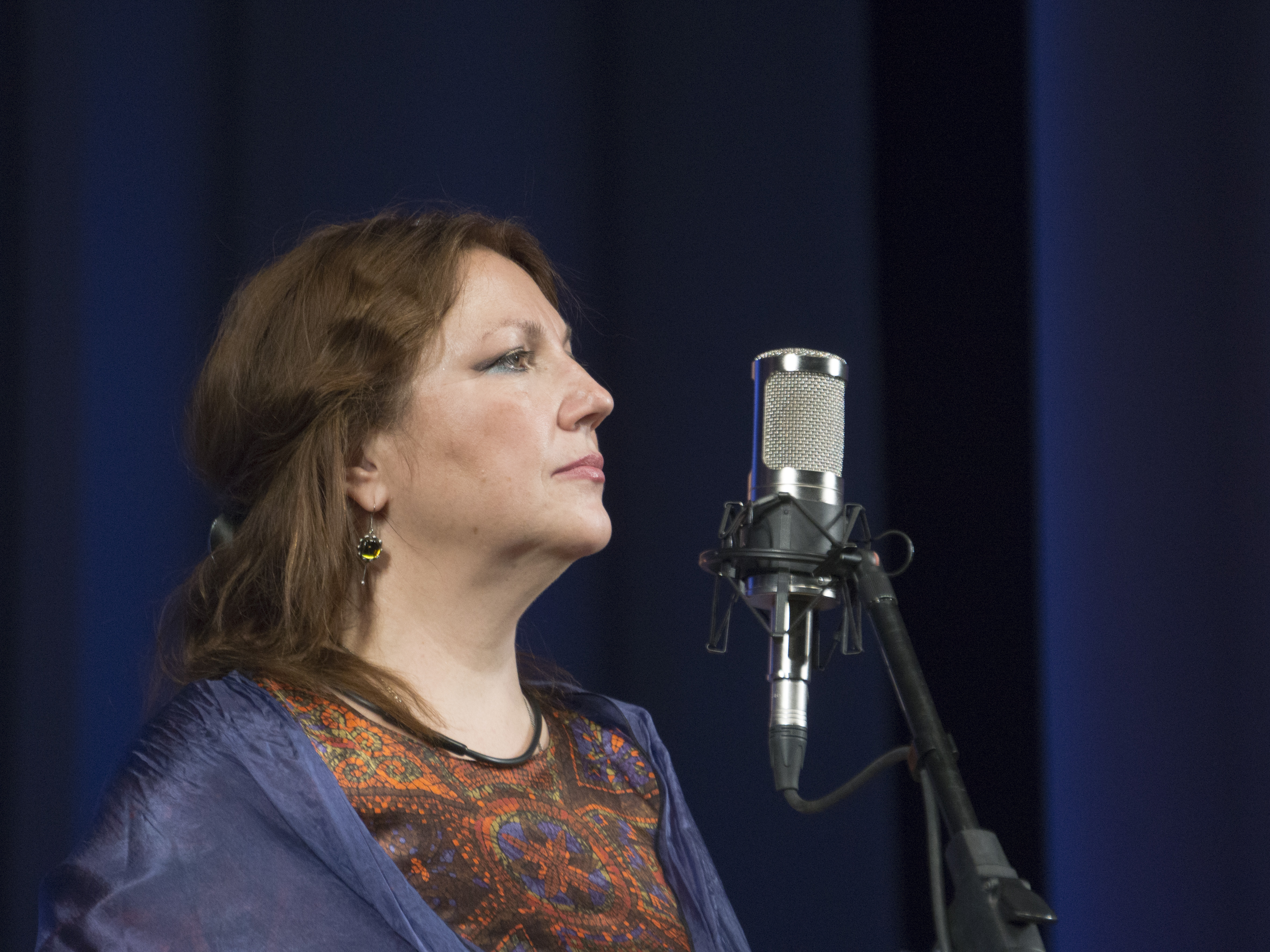

Background information
- Born: 29 February 1964 (age 61); Novokuznetsk, USSR
- Origin: Moscow
- Genres: Folk songs, russian romance
- Occupations: singer-songwriter, composer
- Years active: 1982–present
- Website: smoljaninova.ru

Evgenia Valeryevna Smolyaninova (Russian: Евгения Валерьевна Смольянинова; born 29 February 1964 in Novokuznetsk) is a Russian singer, performer of Russian romance and Folk songs and composer.

Evgenia Smolyaninova was born in a family of teachers in the city of Novokuznetsk; then the family moved to Kemerovo. She studied at music school in Leningrad at the piano department. She made her first appearance as a singer in 1982 in the theater of Slava Polunin in the play "Pictures at an Exhibition" on the music by Mussorgsky.

Her songs and music appear in twelve Russian movies, including short animated film Rusalka by Aleksandr Petrov. She produced sixteen music albums, mostly with Russian romance on music and poetry of 19th and 20th centuries and folk songs. She is a Meritorious Artist of the Russian Federation.

== Links ==
- smoljaninova.ru — official site
- Е.Смольянинова on RussianVoice
- YouTube channel
- VK account
- Facebook account
- Her songs on Russian renaissance site
- Her site on Laminor TV
- Her filmography on Kinopoisk website
