= Ivan Shmelyov =

Russian writer (1873–1950)

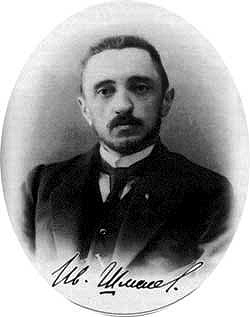
- Born: 3 October [O.S. 21 September] 1873; Moscow, Russian Empire
- Died: 24 June 1950 (aged 76) near Paris, France
- Writing career
- Genre: Fiction
- Notable works: The Stone Age; The Sun of the Dead

Ivan Sergeyevich Shmelyov (Russian: Иван Сергеевич Шмелёв, also spelled Shmelev and Chmelov; 3 October [O.S. 21 September] 1873 – 24 June 1950) was a Russian writer best known for his idyllic recreations of a pre-Revolutionary past spent in the merchant district of Moscow. He was a member of the Moscow literary group Sreda. After the October Revolution Shmelyov fled to France, becoming an émigré writer.

== Biography ==
=== Early life ===
Shmelev was born in the Zamoskovorechye to a merchant family; after finishing high school in 1894 he attended the law faculty of Moscow University. His first published story appeared in 1895; in the same year he visited Valaam Monastery, a trip that had a deep spiritual influence on him and resulted in his first book, On the Cliffs of Valaam (Russian: На скалах Валаама Na skalakh Valaama), published in 1897. After graduating in 1898 he performed military service and spent several years as a civil servant in the provinces while continuing to write; his early stories were published by Maxim Gorky's Znaniye Publishing House. After the Russian Revolution of 1905 his popularity increased, and his 1911 story The Man from the Restaurant (Человек из ресторана Chelovek iz restorana) had tremendous success, making him one of the best known writers of the day; it "depicts, with moments of Dostoyevskyan power, the decadence of the wealthy, as seen by a simple waiter and pious father to whom son and daughter return after disastrous adventures in the world." Shmelyov's story was the basis for Yakov Protazanov's film of the same title, released in 1927, with Mikhail Chekhov in the leading role.

=== Career ===
In 1912 Shmelyov organized the Moscow Writers' Publishing House («Книгоиздательство писателей в Москве»), which published Ivan Bunin, Boris Zaitsev, and other leading writers of the day, as well as his own work. His works from this period on "were remarkable for the richness of their popular (in the sense of narodnyj) language.... Particularly noteworthy was his brilliant use of the skaz technique."

Shmelev welcomed the February Revolution and the fall of the autocracy; he set off on a series of journeys across Russia to see the effects of the change, and was extremely moved when political exiles returning from Siberia told him how much his writings had meant to them. However, he rejected the October Revolution and moved to the White-held Crimea, and when his beloved son Sergei, an officer in the Volunteer Army who had accepted the Bolsheviks' offer of amnesty and refused to follow P. Wrangel into exile in 1920, was seized by Béla Kun's Revolutionary Committee in the Crimea and shot without trial, he accepted Bunin's suggestion that he join him in exile in France.

Perhaps the most powerful of Shemelev's writings in emigration is Solntse mertvykh (1923, tr. as The Sun of the Dead in 1927): "In the mosaic of the impressions of the narrator, an elderly intelligent stuck in the Crimea after the evacuation of Wrangel's troops from the peninsula, there pass the fates of the inhabitants of the Crimea—intelligents, workers, peasants—Tatars and Russians—men and women, all equally clutched in the vice of hunger and fear of the Terror... Everything gradually dies against the background of the loveliness of nature, on the shore of the azure sea, under the rays of a golden sun—the sun of the dead, because it illuminates an earth on which everything has been eaten, drunk, trampled—on which poultry, animals, and men are all dying". Another important work of his later period is The Year of Grace [Leto Gospodne] (1933–48), an autobiographical novel full of lovingly drawn characters and beautifully observed details in which "his style reaches a high level of lyrical and epic contemplation". The tetralogy from which Shmelev has had time to complete only first two volumes of the novel "The heavenly ways" (1937, 1948) has been conceived. Operation of the third part of the novel should occur in deserts Optinoj where after many shocks and irreplaceable losses its hero finds the sincere world and the higher sense of life begins to see clearly.

=== Later life ===
The younger generation of Russian writers, who came of age in exile, sometimes did not appreciate Shmelev's traditionalism and approval of the patriarchal society. Nina Berberova wrote of a reading in Paris in 1942: "Shmelev read as they read in the provinces before the time of Chekhov: with shouts and muttering, like an actor. He read some old-fashioned stuff, churchy, silly, about religious processions and hearty Russian dishes. The audience was ecstatic and clapped." But his rich prose and his deep roots in Russian culture won him many readers when he was finally published in his homeland. Fifty years after his death, in 2000, the remains of Shmelyov and his wife were transferred from the Sainte-Geneviève-des-Bois Russian Cemetery to the necropolis of Donskoy Monastery in Moscow.

== English translations ==
- The Sun of the Dead, Dent, 1927.
- The Story of a Love, Dutton, 1931.
- Shadows of Days, Christ's Vespers, and The Little Egg from A Russian Cultural Revival, University of Tennessee Press, 1981. ISBN 0-87049-296-9
- The Stone Age, Barbary Coast, 1985.

== See also ==
- My Love a film adaptation of 1927's A Love Story
