= Alexander Toluboff =

Russian-American art director (1882–1940)

- Born: 27 August 1882; Lublin, Congress Poland, Russian Empire
- Died: 1 July 1940 (aged 57); Bloomfield Hills, Michigan, US
- Occupation: Art director
- Years active: 1927–1939

Alexander Toluboff (Russian: Александр Анатольевич Толубов, romanized: Aleksandr Anatolyevich Tolubov; (Note: Also spelled Tolubeyev; Russian: Толубеев.) 27 August 1882 – 1 July 1940) was a Russian-born American art director. He was nominated for three Academy Awards in the category Best Art Direction. He was born in Lublin, Poland, and died in Bloomfield Hills, Michigan.

== Selected filmography ==
Toluboff was nominated for three Academy Awards for Best Art Direction:

- Vogues of 1938 (1937);
- Algiers (1938);
- Stagecoach (1939).
