= Rusalka (1996 film) =

Mermaid
- Directed by: Aleksandr Petrov
- Written by: Marina Vishnevetskaya; Aleksandr Petrov
- Music by: Yevgenia Smolyaninova
- Release date: 1996
- Running time: 10 minutes
- Country: Russia
- Language: Russian

Mermaid (Russian: Русалка, translit. Rusalka) is a 1996 Russian animated short film directed by Aleksandr Petrov and showcasing the paint-on-glass animation technique for which Petrov is known. The story is based on traditional Slavic folklore about the rusalki, river-dwelling mermaids said to be "born" from the unhappy souls of young women who had committed suicide by drowning—usually after being mistreated by a man. The Russian "mermaid" is, for this reason, a dangerous creature more akin to the Greek sirens than to the American archetype such as Walt Disney Animation Studios' cute and lovable Ariel.

== Plot ==
As springtime begins to break up the ice on a frozen river, a handsome young novice monk rescues a naked girl who has apparently fallen into the water. She disappears suddenly, but returns time and time again over the ensuing months—first demonstrating her dolphin-like swimming ability and then winning the young man's heart with her coquettish flirting and beautiful singing.

The young monk's elderly master comes to understand that the rusalka is actually the drowned spirit of a girlfriend he himself had loved and betrayed as a youth, and takes steps to protect his naive apprentice from her supernatural revenge. But when the mermaid recognizes the old monk as the man who had once jilted her, it may not be the young apprentice who is in mortal danger.

== Awards ==
- 1997—Berlin International Film Festival: Golden Bear Nomination for "Best Animated Short Film"
- 1997—Annecy International Animated Film Festival: "Jury Prize"
- 1998—Academy Awards: Nominated for "Best Animated Short Film"
- 1998—Animafest Zagreb: "Grand Prize"

== See also ==
- Mermaids in popular culture
