= The Cow (1989 film) =

1989 film directed by Aleksandr Petrov

The Cow (Russian: Корова Korova) is a 1989 Soviet animated short film directed by Aleksandr Petrov.

== Summary ==
The film, based on a short story by Andrei Platonov, tells the story of a boy who recalls how his family lost its cow.

== Technique ==
It was made using paint-on-glass animation.

== Accolades ==
The film competed at the 40th Berlin International Film Festival, where it received an Honourable Mention and also received the Gran Prix of the Hiroshima International Animation Festival. It was nominated for the Academy Award for Best Animated Short Film.
