= Mikhail Litvyakov =

Soviet and Russian documentary flm director

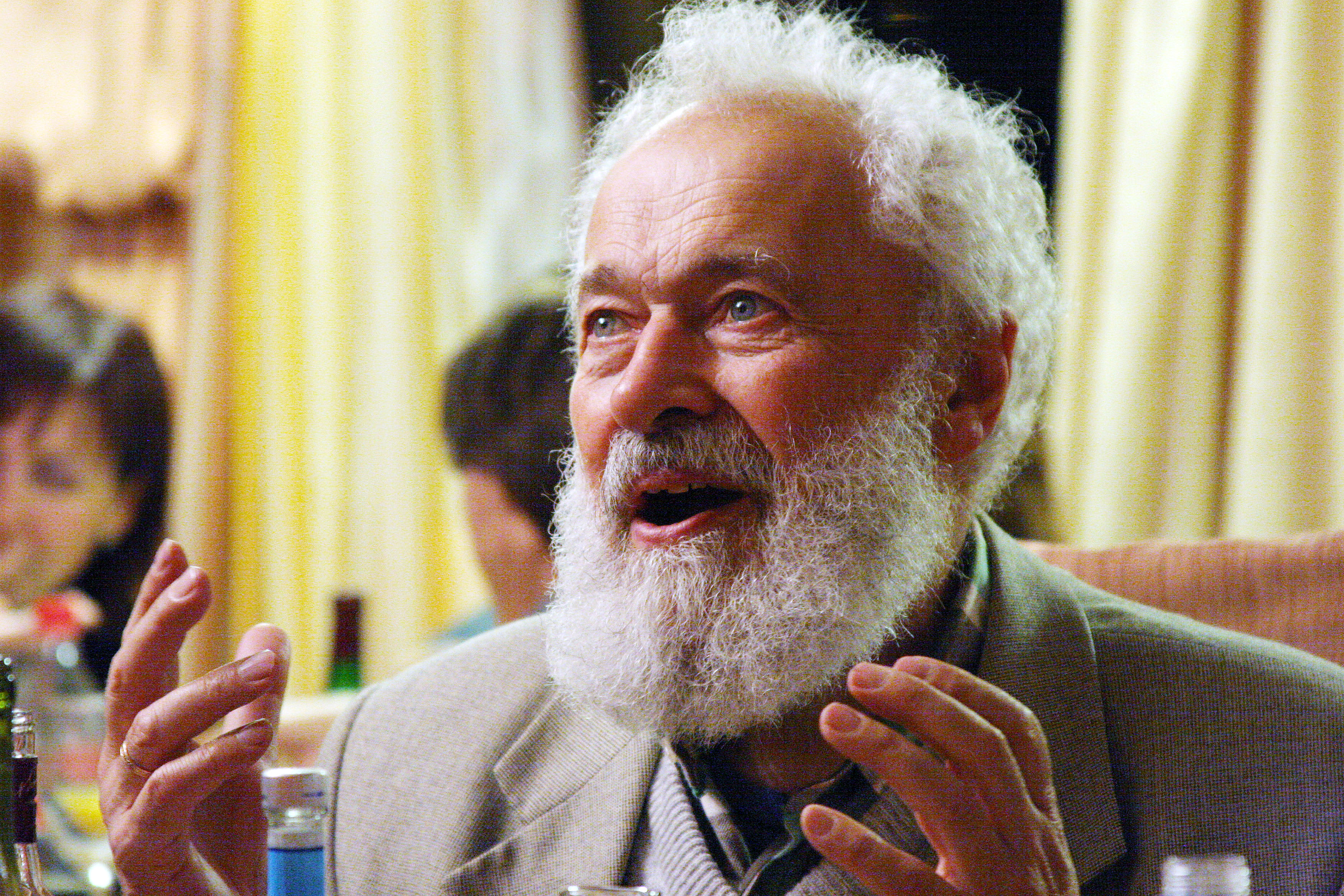
Mikhail Litvyakov in 2008

Mikhail Sergeyevich Litvyakov (Russian: Михаи́л Серге́евич Литвяко́в) (born May 17, 1938) is a Soviet and Russian documentary film director.

Graduated from VGIK, 1965.

== Awards and decorations ==
- 2019: Laurel Branch prize
- 1997:Order of Friendship
- 1987: Meritorious in arts of the RSFSR
- 1983: USSR State Prize for the 1982 documentary «Мы не сдаёмся, мы идём»
- 1977: Vasilyev Brothers State Prize of the RSFSR for the 1976 documentary «Девятая высота»
