= Aleksandr Petrov (animator) =

Russian painter (born 1957)

- Александр Петров
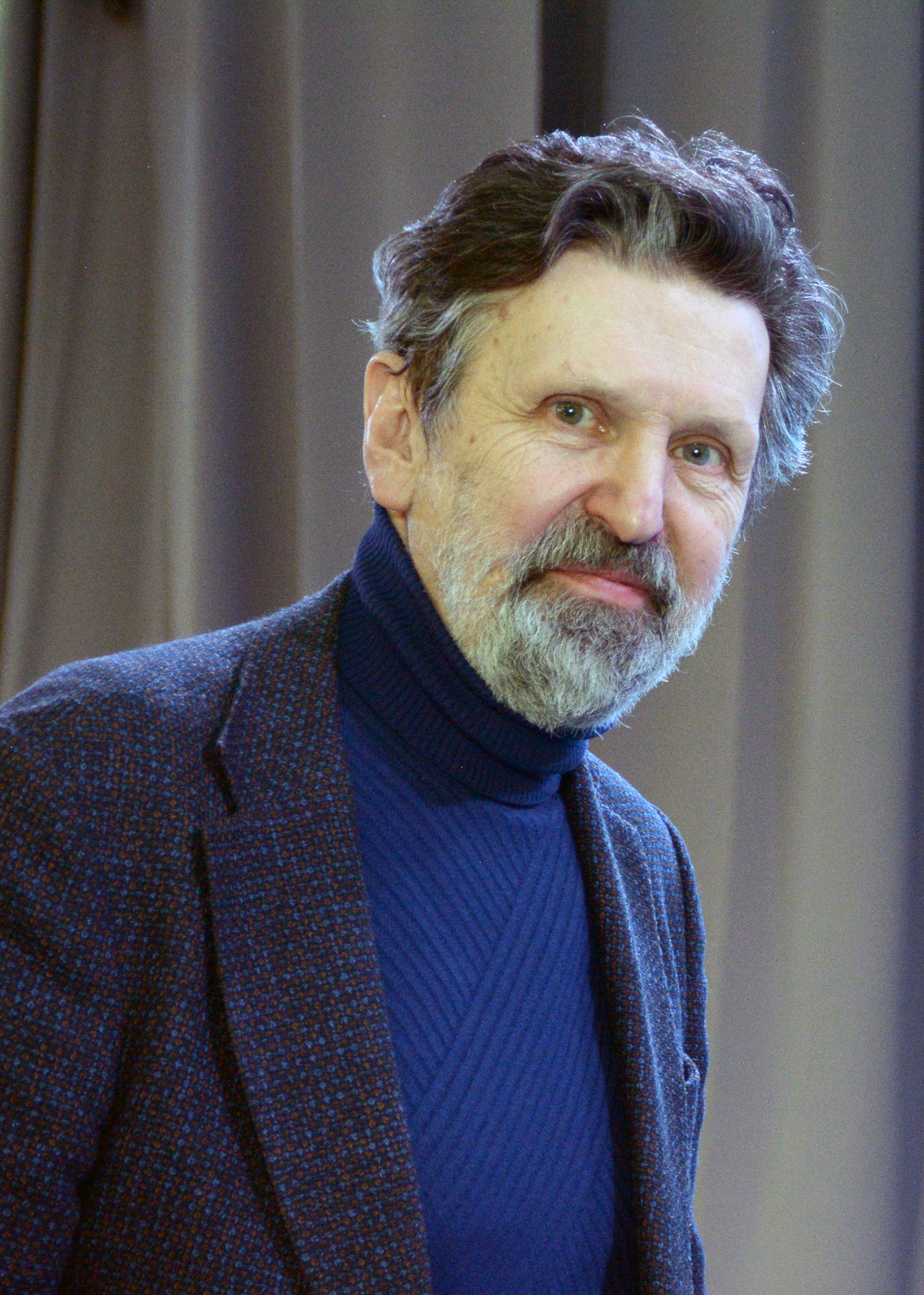
- Petrov in 2023
- Born: July 17, 1957 (age 69); Prechistoye, Russian SFSR
- Education: Yaroslavl Art School
- Occupations: Animator; filmmaker
- Years active: 1984–present
- Awards: Honoured art worker of the Russian Federation, State Prize of the Russian Federation (1994), Krupskaya State Prize of the RSFSR, 72nd Academy Awards

Aleksandr Konstantinovich Petrov (also Alexander or Alexandre; Russian: Александр Константинович Петров; born 17 July 1957) is a Russian animator and animation director known for his paint-on-glass animation technique. Many of his films are adaptations of short stories and novellas by authors such as Ernest Hemingway, Fyodor Dostoyevsky, and Alexander Pushkin. For his film The Old Man and the Sea he won an Academy Award.

== Biography ==
Petrov was born in the village of Prechistoye (Yaroslavl Oblast) and lives in Yaroslavl. He studied art at VGIK (state institute of cinema and TV) and was a disciple of Yuriy Norshteyn at Moscow's Advanced School for Screenwriters and Directors.

After making his first films in Russia he moved to Canada where he adapted the novel The Old Man and the Sea, resulting in a 20-minute animated short. Technically impressive, the film is made entirely in pastel oil paintings on glass, a technique mastered by only a handful of animators in the world. By using his fingertips instead of a paintbrush on different glass sheets positioned on multiple levels, each covered with slow-drying oil paints, he was able to add depth to his paintings. After photographing each frame painted on the glass sheets, which was four times larger than the usual A4-sized canvas, he had to slightly modify the painting for the next frame and so on. It took him over two years—from March 1997 through April 1999—to paint each of the 29,000+ frames. For the shooting of the frames a special adapted motion-control camera system was built, probably the most precise computerized animation stand ever made. On this an IMAX camera was mounted, and a video-assist camera was then attached to the IMAX camera. The film was highly acclaimed, receiving the Academy Award for Animated Short Film and Grand Prix at the Annecy International Animated Film Festival.

After this, Aleksandr Petrov has maintained a close relationship with Pascal Blais Studio in Canada, which helped fund The Old Man and the Sea, where he works on commercials. He returned to Yaroslavl in Russia to work on his latest film, My Love, which was finished in spring 2006 after three years' work and had its premiere at the Hiroshima International Animation Festival on 27 August, where it won the Audience Prize and the Special International Jury Prize. On 17 March 2007, My Love was theatrically released at the Cinema Angelika in Shibuya, (Japan) by Studio Ghibli, as the first release of the "Ghibli Museum Library" (theatrical and DVD releases of Western animated films in Japan).

In a 2009 interview, Petrov stated that he was jobless and using-up the last of his previously earned money. A 2010 article stated that Petrov wants to create an animated feature film with his technique, but cannot start because of lack of funds. Four years later he directed a three-minute animated sequence for the Sochi Paralympic Games called Firebird (Жар-птица). In an interview later that year, Petrov confirmed that if he can find the funding, he would like to work on a feature film in the future using his signature style, and stated that he is currently working on a film project but that it is progressing with great difficulty.

In July 2016, Petrov sat on the board of directors for the International Film Festival of Poetic Animation held in Pergola, Italy.

In July 2020, Petrov told reporters that he had started pre-production work on a 60-minute biographical film called Knyaz about Alexander Nevsky, which would be released in 2025. In March 2021 he said that the film had entered production and would be released in late 2024. Nevsky exhibited sketches for the film in 2023 and 2024.

== Artistic style ==
Still from The Old Man and the Sea

Petrov's style from the late 1980s onward can be characterized as a type of Romantic realism. People, animals and landscapes are painted and animated in a very realistic fashion, but there are many sections in his films where Petrov attempts to depict a character's inner thoughts and dreams. In The Old Man and the Sea, for example, the fisherman dreams that he and the marlin are brothers swimming through the sea and the sky. In My Love, the main character's illness is represented by showing him being buried beneath freshly fallen snow on a dark night.

== Filmography ==
=== Director ===
- 1988—Marathon, Марафон (Marafon) (directed and animated with Mikhail Tumelya)
- 1989—The Cow, Корова (Korova) (after Andrey Platonov)
- 1992—The Dream of a Ridiculous Man, Сон смешного человека (Son smeshnovo cheloveka) (after Fyodor Dostoevsky)
- 1997—Mermaid, Русалка (Rusalka) (after Alexander Pushkin)
- 1999—The Old Man and the Sea (after Ernest Hemingway)
- 2003—Participated in Winter Days, 冬の日 (Fuyu no hi)
- 2006—My Love, Моя любовь (Moya lyubov) (after Ivan Shmelev)
- 2014—Firebird, Жар-птица (Zhar-ptitsa)

=== Art director ===
- 1984—By a Wave of the Wand, По щучьему велению (Po shchuchyemu veleniyu) (directed by Valeriy Fomin, cutout animation)
- 1985—Tale of a Small Fry, Сказочка про козявочку (Skazochka pro kozyavochku) (directed by Vladimir Petkevich, paint-on-glass)
- 1986—Welcome, Добро пожаловать (Dobro pozhalovat) (directed by Alexei Karayev, paint-on-glass)
- 1989—The Guardian, Хранитель (Khranitel) (directed by Vladimir Petkevich, ?)

== Awards ==
- 1988—Ottawa International Animation Festival: Welcome, "Grand Prix"
- 1990—Berlin International Film Festival: The Cow, "Honorable Mention" in the category "Best Short Film"
- 1990—Academy Award for Best Animated Short Film: The Cow (nominated)
- 1990—Ottawa International Animation Festival: The Cow, "OIAF Award for Best First Film"
- 1992—Bombay International Documentary, Short and Animation Film Festival: The Cow, "Golden Conch for Best Animation Film"
- 1992—Ottawa International Animation Festival: The Dream of a Ridiculous Man, "Audience Award" and "OIAF Award for Best Production Between 10 and 30 Minutes in Length"
- 1993—Cracow Film Festival: The Dream of a Ridiculous Man, "Special Mention for the depiction of a crucial subject in the form of animation"
- 1997—Cinanima: The Mermaid, "Grand Prize"
- 1997—International Leipzig Festival for Documentary and Animated Film: The Mermaid, "Honorable Mention" in the category "Animated Films and Videos"
- 1997—2nd Open Russian Festival of Animated Film: The Mermaid, "Best Animator of a Drawn Film", "3rd Place Rating by Audience Vote"
- 1998—Academy Award for Best Animated Short Film: The Mermaid (nominated)
- 1998—Ottawa International Animation Festival: The Mermaid, "Craft Prize" in the category "Best Story"
- 1998—Zagreb World Festival of Animated Films: The Mermaid, "Grand Prize"
- 1999—Academy Award for Best Animated Short Film: The Old Man and the Sea
- 2006—11th Hiroshima International Animation Festival: My Love, "Audience Prize" and "Special International Jury Prize"
- 2006—International Leipzig Festival for Documentary and Animated Film: My Love, "FIPRESCI Prize for Best Animation"
- 2006—Animation Show of Shows; My Love
- 2007—12th Open Russian Festival of Animated Film: My Love, "Grand Prix", "Best Direction" and "Best Visuals"
- 2007—XVII International "Message to Man" Film Festival: My Love, "Grand Prix"
- 2007—Academy Award for Best Animated Short Film: My Love (nominated)

== Bibliography ==
- Olivier Cotte (2007) Secrets of Oscar-Winning Animation: Behind the Scenes of 13 Classic Short Animations. (The Old Man and the Sea) Focal Press. ISBN 978-0-240-52070-4
