= Fortunatus (book) =

German chapbook

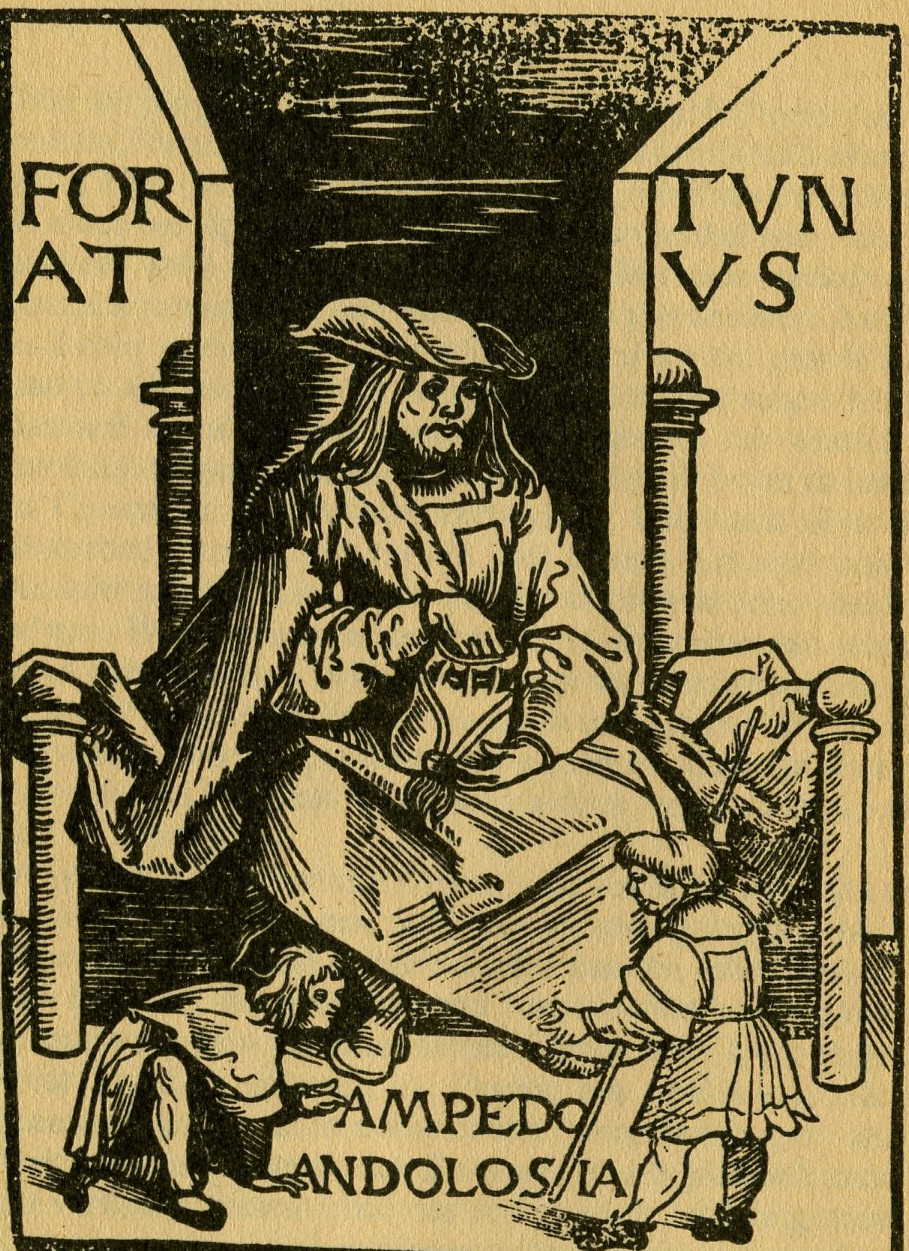
Title page of Ausgabe des Fortunatus, 1509

Fortunatus is a German proto-novel or chapbook about a legendary hero popular in 15th- and 16th-century Europe, and usually associated with a magical inexhaustible purse.

The plot of the novel also appears in variants from oral tradition across Europe, Asia, Americas and Africa, which are classified in the international Aarne-Thompson-Uther Index as tale type ATU 566, "The Three Magic Objects and the Wonderful Fruits".

== Tale ==
The tale follows the life of a young man named Fortunatus from relative obscurity through his adventures towards fame and fortune; it subsequently follows the careers of his two sons. Fortunatus was a native, says the story, of Famagusta in Cyprus, and meeting the goddess of Fortune in a forest received from her a purse which was continually replenished as often as he drew from it. With this he wandered through many lands, and at Cairo was the guest of the sultan. Among the treasures which the sultan showed him was an old napless hat which had the power of transporting its wearer to any place he desired. Of this hat, he feloniously possessed himself and returned to Cyprus, where he led a luxurious life. On his death he left the purse and the hat to his sons Ampedo and Andelosia; but they were jealous of each other, and by their recklessness and folly soon fell on evil days.

Like Miguel de Cervantes' tale Don Quixote, Fortunatus is a tale which marks the passing of the feudal world into the more modern, globalised, capitalist world. Not quite a morality tale in the purest sense, it nonetheless was clearly written in order to convey lessons to the reader. The moral of the story is obvious: men should desire reason and wisdom before all the treasures of the world. It is far too easy, without wisdom, to lose one's fortune, no matter how it was acquired.

== Sources ==
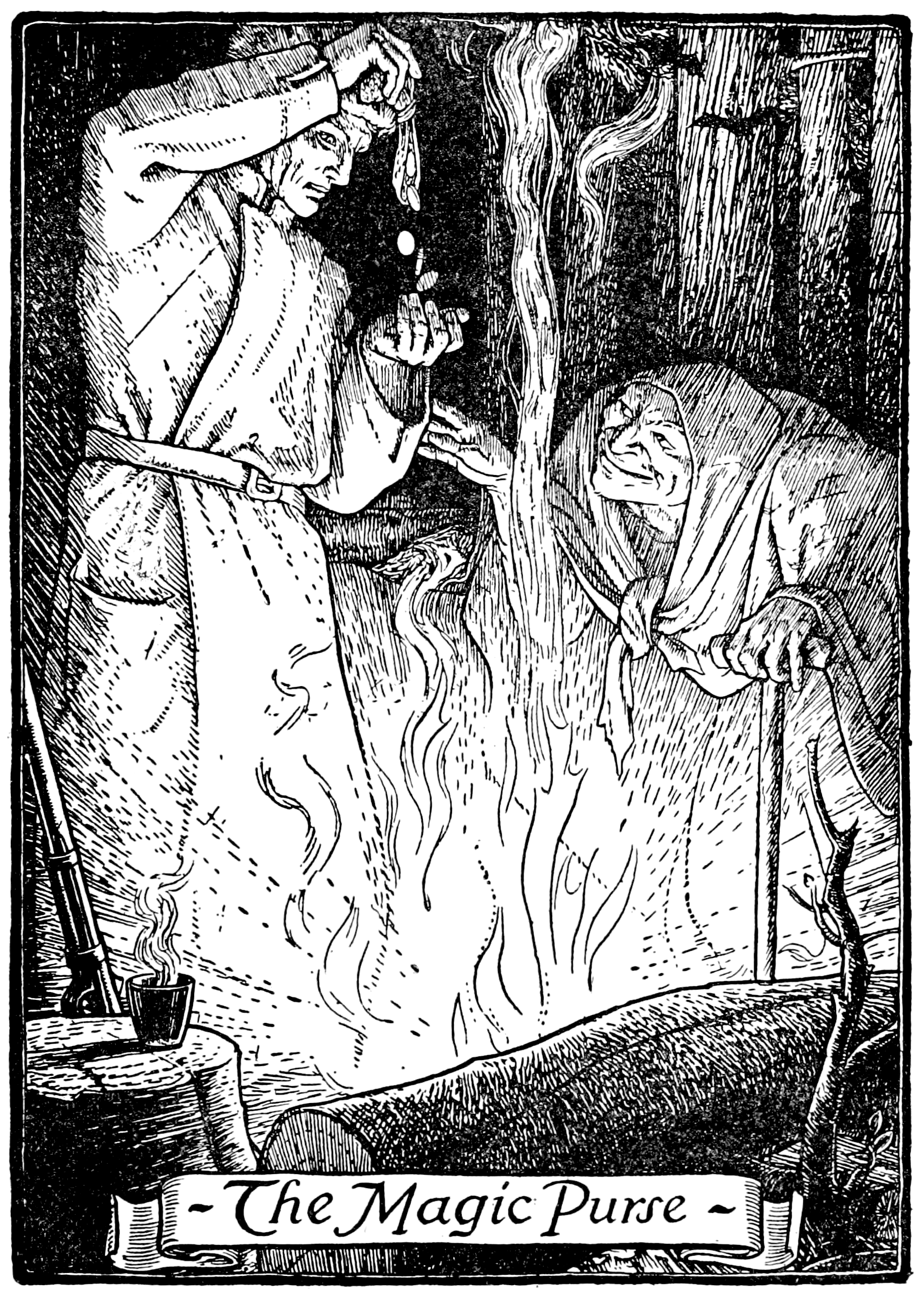
The old lady gives the soldier (Fortunatus) the magic never-emptying purse. Illustration by John Batten for Joseph Jacobs's Europa's Fairy Book (1916).

According to the recent English translator Michael Haldane, Fortunatus was first published in Augsburg in 1509. It was printed by one Johann Otmar and sold in Johannes Heybler's apothecary in that city. Many sources were integrated to create the text. These include:

- The Itinerarius of Johannes von Montevilla (or John de Mandeville), 1355; translated into German 1480, the oldest extant dated editions having been printed in Augsburg (1481 and 1482).
- The story of Wlad III Drakul (1456–62, 1476 Lord of Wallachia, or Vlad the Impaler), the oldest extant dated German accounts having been printed in Nuremberg (1488), Bamberg (1491) and Augsburg (1494).
- The Gesta Romanorum, printed in Augsburg in 1473.
- Two accounts of St. Patrick's Purgatory printed in Augsburg in 1489.
- Hans Tucher der Ältere, Beschreibung der Reyß ins Heylig Land [1479-80] (Augsburg, 1482).
- Bernhard von Breydenbach, Peregrinationes in terram sanctam (1486); Die heyligen reyssen gen Jherusalem (Mainz, 1486; Augsburg, 1488?).
- Rudolf von Ems, Willehalms von Orlens und Amelies. 13th century; printed in Augsburg, 1491.
- Perhaps the travels of the Bohemian nobleman Leo von Rozmital (1465–67). These can be read in: Malcolm Letts (ed.), The Travels of Leo of Rozmital through Germany, Flanders England, France Spain, Portugal and Italy, 1465-67. Cambridge: Cambridge University Press, 1957.

In its full form the history of Fortunatus occupies, in Karl Simrock's Die deutschen Volksbucher, vol. iii., upwards of 158 pages. The scene is continually shifted – from Cyprus to Flanders, from Flanders to London, from London to France; and a large number of secondary characters appear.

The style and allusions indicate a comparatively modern date for the authorship; but the nucleus of the legend can be traced back to a much earlier period. The stories of Jonathas and the three jewels in the Gesta Romanorum, of the emperor Frederick and the three precious stones in the Cento Novelle antiche, of the Mazin of Khorassan in the Thousand and One Nights, and the flying scaffold in the Bahar Danush, have all a certain similarity.

The 19th-century German journalist Joseph Görres wrote a lengthy essay about the source of the story of Fortunatus, suggesting a Nordic origin and a possible ancient source: the tale of Jonathan, son of Darius, in the Gesta Romanorum.

The Brothers Grimm, in the annotations to their tales, suggested an Iberian or Spanish source for the Fortunatus tale, based on names such as Ampedo and Andolosia.

== Author ==
The author is not known; it has been suggested that he may have been Burkhard Zink (1396-1474/5), an Augsburg merchant, councillor, chronicler and traveller. His Augsburg chronicle covers the years 1368-1468 and comprises four books, of which the third, an autobiography, is considered the best, and he is praised for giving "Einblicke von seltener Eindringlichkeit in die Lebensrealität des SpätMA" ("outstandingly penetrating insights into the reality of life in the late Middle Ages"); The most plausible suggestion to date is that Johannes Heybler – the publisher – was himself the author.

== Versions ==
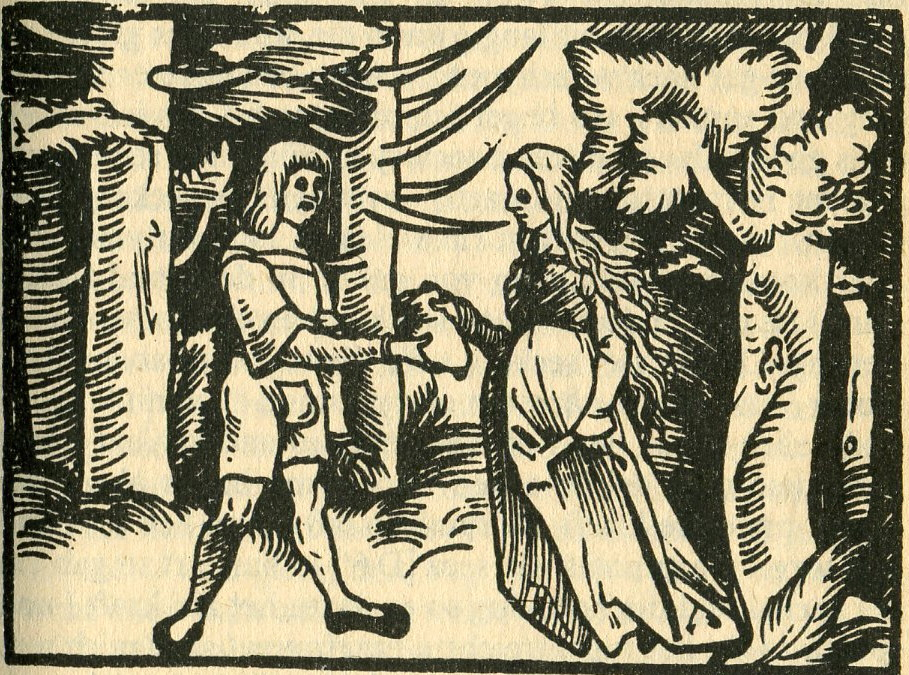
Fortune bestows the purse. Woodcut from the Augsburg edition (1509)

The earliest known edition of the German text of Fortunatus appeared at Augsburg in 1509, and the modern German investigators are disposed to regard this as the original form. Karl Simrock reproduced this version in his Deutsche Volksbücher (3 vols., Frankfort, 1846). In 1530 an edition was published entitled Fortunatus von seinem Seckel und Wunschhütlein. Innumerable versions occur in French, Italian, Dutch and English. The story was dramatized by Hans Sachs in 1553, and by Thomas Dekker in 1600, titled Old Fortunatus; and the latter's comedy appeared in a German translation in Englische Komodien und Tragodien, 1620. Ludwig Tieck has utilized the legend in his Phantasus, and Adelbert von Chamisso in his Peter Schlemihl; and Ludwig Uhland left an unfinished narrative poem entitled Fortunatus and his Sons.

19th-century theologue Johann Andreas Christian Löhr wrote an abridged and moralizing tale (German: "Fortunat mit seinem Säckel und Wünschhütlein"; English: "Fortunatus with his bag and wishing-cap"), using as basis the story of Fortunatus.

An anonymous English compilation of French fairy tales written by Charles Perrault and Madame d'Aulnoy published the story as Fortunatus, or the Wishing Cap. A later publication renamed it Fortunatus and the Wishing Cap. Andrew Lang included it in The Grey Fairy Book as "Fortunatus and his Purse".

A fairy tale compilation by English novelist Dinah Craik included the tale, under the name Fortunatus, following an 1818 publication by Benjamin Tabart, who included an homonymous tale. In the same vein, Ernest Rhys edited a collection of English fairy tales and included one version of tale, named Old Fortunatus after the English play. A third English version exists, titled The History of Fortunatus.

== Analysis ==
=== Hero and donor ===
In folkloristics, the gifting of a never-emptying purse by a magical being is part of a series of tales later classified in the Aarne–Thompson–Uther Index as ATU 566, "The Three Magic Objects and the Wonderful Fruits". In several variants, the goddess of Fortune of the original tale is replaced by an old lady, a princess or other supernatural being.

Scholarship points that the hero of the tale is sometimes an only child who is given the three objects, or one of three brothers or friends who are each given one of the items. Folklorist Joseph Jacobs also noted that the protagonists of the story were "generally ... three soldiers, or often brothers, but more frequently casual comrades."

=== Magic objects ===
The tale is close to "The Knapsack, the Hat, and the Horn" (KHM 54 and ATU 569), where three brothers are given the magical objects. In the same vein, scholarship points to some relationship between tale types ATU 563, "The Table, the Ass, and the Stick", ATU 566 and ATU 569, a relationship already noticed by scholar Reinhold Köhler (de).

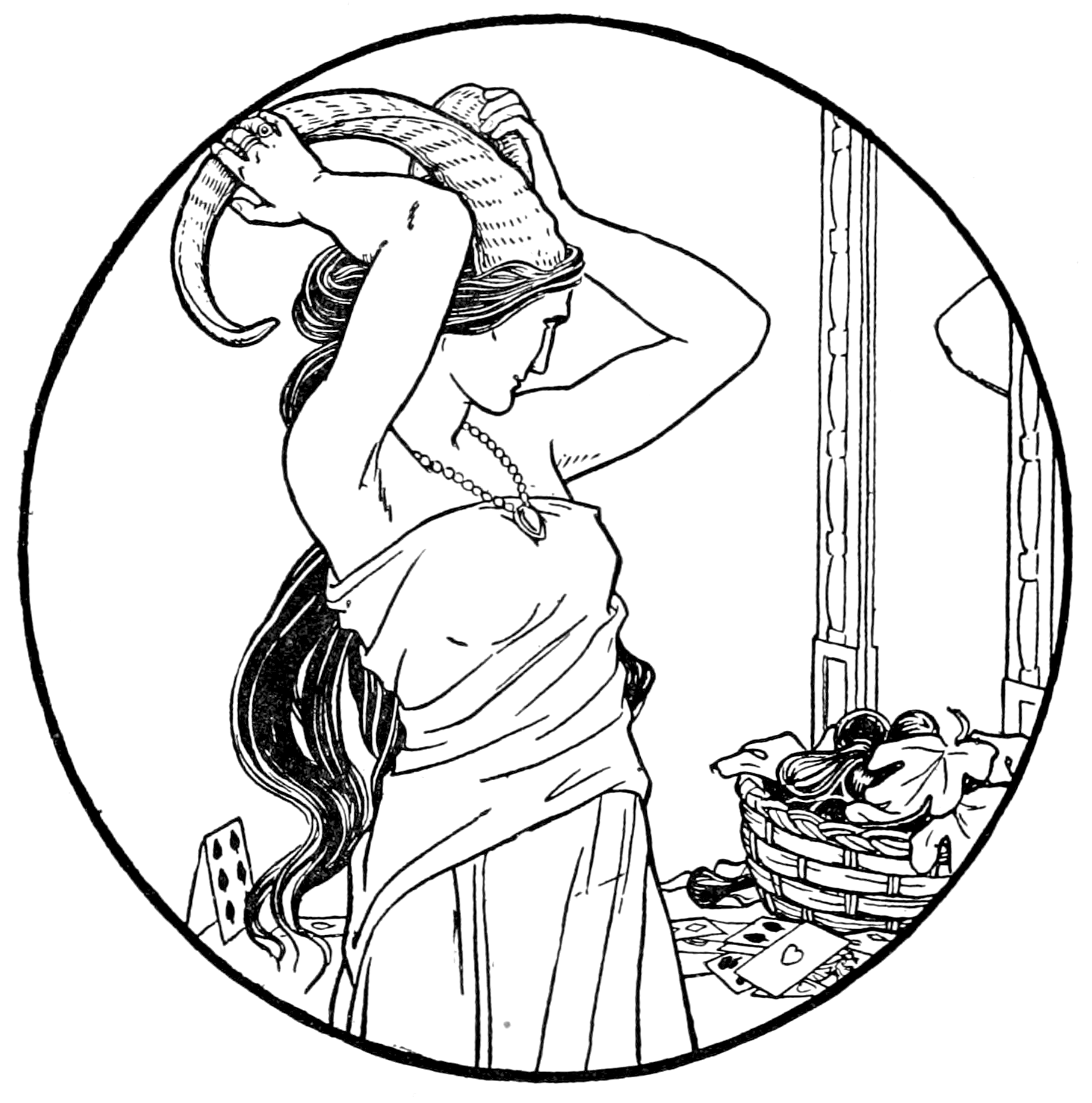
The Princess finds horns growing on her head after eating the figs. Illustration by John Batten for Joseph Jacobs's Europa's Fairy Book (1916).

Despite their proximity, these tales differ in that in the ATU 566 the adversary is a cunning princess who acquires the magical objects, but gets her just deserts with magical fruits that grow horns or other deformities when eaten. The usual deformities are horns, instead of the nose (as in Grimm's version). In tale type ATU 563, the hero regains the magical objects by a third magical item, usually a stick.

William Alexander Clouston, Scottish folklorist, published an essay in which he compared the magic objects of the Fortunatus tale with many tales featuring similar items. Professor Michael Meraklis noted that the usual objects in Greek variants are a hat that grants invisibility, a rifle that shoots in any direction, a sheet that makes the user fly and a tobacco pipe that summons a servant.

=== Possible origins ===
Folklorist Stith Thompson suggested that the ATU 566 tale is "essentially west European folk tradition", following professor Antti Aarne's study on some 145 variants (most of which are European). On the other hand, French scholar Claude Bremond put forth a theory that tale types 566 "Fortunatus", 567 "The Magic Bird-Heart" and 938 "Placidus"/"Eustacius" are related and derive from a single source, possibly Indian.

A third position, by Hans-Jörg Uther, argues that, due to the proximity between tale types ATU 566, ATU 567, ATU 567A, the type ATU 567 may have originated from a combination with type ATU 566. In this regard, scholar Christine Ohno's analysis of all three tale types suggested a combination of the Indian version of ATU 566 and ATU 567A, "The Magic Bird-Heart and the Separated Brothers", gave rise to the South Asian story of Saiyid and Said and from the latter originated the "West European" version of the tale type ATU 567, where the magical bird falls into the hands of a sole hero, instead of two brothers as in other variants.

Emmanuel Cosquin noted, in his time, two distinct groups of stories: the first one, where the hero regains the magical objects with the use of the fruits; and the second one, close to the tales later classified as ATU 567, "The Magic Bird-Heart". Stith Thompson mentioned that Aarne's folktale study pinpointed its origin as Asiatic, possibly originating in Persia, and Richard MacGillivray Dawkins remarked that variants are found in Turkey, south Siberia and in Persia itself. Regardless, the tale can also be found throughout India and versions of it are attested in ancient Buddhist and Jain literature. Similar stories are attested in historical Burmese anecdotes and as an ancient tale from the Jatakas, with a magical rooster, or a pair of birds named Bihangama and Bihangami.

French man of letter, Comte de Caylus wrote a version of the tale of the Magic Bird Heart, titled L'Oiseau Jaune ("The Yellow Bird") and inserted the story in the narrative of his tale Sylvain and Jocosa. "The Yellow Bird" shows heavy Eastern influence.

== Variants ==
=== Early parallels ===
Johannes Bolte and Jiří Polívka list as early literary parallels an Italian story from the 16th century (Historia di tre giovani e di tre fate) and a French literary story from Le Cabinet des Fées with an oriental flair (French: Histoire du Prince Tangut et de la princesse au pied de nez; English: "The History of Prince Tangut and the princess with a nose a foot long").

Another literary predecessor pointed by both scholars is Die Prinzessin mit der langen Nase, penned by Friedrich Hildebrand von Einsiedel, whose work was published in the collection Dschinnistan (1789), by Christoph Martin Wieland. This tale was also adapted to the stage as Der Barometermacher auf der Zauberinsel (1823) (de).

David Blamires points that the tale of Jonathan, in the Gesta Romanorum, is a version of the folktype later classified as ATU 566.

Spanish scholarship recognizes La ventura en la desdicha, one of the works of Zaragozan religious writer Ana Francisca Abarca de Bolea (1679), as containing an incarnation of the story of Fortunatus written as a moralizing tale.

=== Europe ===
==== Ireland ====
Irish folklorist Patrick Kennedy listed an Irish variant titled Gilla na Gruaga Donna ("The fellow with the brown hair"), and noted, in his commentaries, that the tale was known in Germany as Die Drei Soldaten ("The Three Soldiers").

Author Seumas MacManus published an Irish tale titled The Wishing Chair of the Lord of Errigal. In this tale, the Lord of Errigal dies, and his heirlooms are bequeathed to his son Cormac, a handsome fellow, but also a spendthrift. Part of the inheritance is a normal looking armchair that is actually a magical wishing chair. He decides to have the daughter of the Lord Mayor as his wife (and her fortune). Unfortunately for him, she is also a skilled gambler, and beats him in a game, leaving him penniless. Later, Cormac meets some hunters on a hunt for a specific hare, the White Hare of Glen-na-smoil, whose right paw grants infinite money. With this new source of money, Cormac regains his wealth, to the Lord Mayor's daughter's interest: she plays with him again and steals from him the hare's right paw while he is asleep. Next, Cormac finds another source of wealth, an egg from the Blackbird of Glen-na-smoil, which is also stolen by the Lord Mayor's daughter. Falling into poverty twice, the youth goes to rest on his father's unsuspecting armchair, and utters loudly he wishes to be in the Lord Mayor's daughter's house. It happens thus: the Lord Mayor's daughter finds out about the Wishing Chair, and goads Cormac to wish them away to the "Isle of Loneliness". He fulfills her request, and both are teleported to the island. The girl takes the opportunity to caress his hair and stick a bioran suan (a sleeping pin) on his head, sits on the chair and wishes her away, abandoning Cormac on the island. The youth wakes up and notices he all alone in the island, then goes to find some food source: green apples that make horns appear on the head, and red apples that make it fall. The next year, Cormac waits for a ship to rescue him and takes the apples with him to teach the Lord Mayor's daughter a lesson.

Irish author Edna O'Brien published an Irish variant in her book Tales for the Telling, with the title The Magic Apples. In this tale, a very lazy boy named Marty welcomes a beggar and his daughter, Sinead, to his house and gives them manna as food. Marty and Sinead marry and have a son named Marteen. Years later, Marteen decides to earn his fortune, and meets a pedlar on the road, who tells him of a rich lord and his daughter in Limerick. Marteen decides to go there to impress the lord's daughter with his acrobatics and tricks, and meets three beggars on the road (who are the same person), to whom Marteen gives his money. In gratitude, the beggar takes Marteen to an inn and gives the youth a magic ring that always produces money. Marteen goes to Limerick, buys some fine clothes and introduces himself to the lord and his daughter. Marteen falls asleep and his ring falls from his pocket, which the lord's daughter fetches, but her stepsister snatches from her hand and runs to her room. The stepsister sees the ring in action when it provides bars of gold, and lies to the girl the ring fell in a pond. Marteen learns of the ring's loss, then goes home despondent. Some time later, after an episode with the lord himself and four talking cats, Marteen cures the lord with water from the boundary well of Coolawn, and asks him again about the ring. Later, Marteen meets in the woods three brothers boxing over their inheritance: a teleporting ring, a self-filling goblet and a harp that plays every tune. Marteen tricks the boys, unburies the objects and goes again to Limerick to impress his beloved. Again, Marteen drinks from the self-filling cup and falls asleep; the stepsister steals the second ring, the cup and the harp. Marteen wakes up and, not seeing the objects, leaves. He then goes to an orchard where he eats red apples (which make horns grow on his head) and golden apples (which breaks off the horns). Marteen takes both types of fruits with him to the lord's house in Limerick and offers them to the inhabitants: horns grow on their heads, and Marteen promises to reverse the change if he gets the objects back. His beloved, the girl, points to her stepsister as the culprit, and Marteen gives them the golden apples, as he promised.

==== Scotland ====
A Scottish variant, titled The Three Soldiers, was collected by John Francis Campbell in Popular Tales of the West Highlands. He also collected and transcribed a version in Gaelic (Ursgeul), as well as a version with Coinneach Buidhe ("Kenneth the Yellow"), from Dibaig, and a version from Castle Bay, Barra, involving swan maidens. He also compared it to The Krautesel, or Donkey Cabbages, where the characters are transformed into donkeys. Campbell's tale was translated by Loys Brueyre as Les Trois Soldats.

==== Germany ====
French-born poet Adelbert von Chamisso developed in 1806 his own treatment of the Fortunatus legend, titled Fortunati Glücksäckel und Wunschhütlein.

The Brothers Grimm collected a previous version titled Die lange Nase, with many similarities to the Donkey Cabbages tale, but it was expunged from later editions of the collection. Apart from Grimm's purged tale, variants with the title Die lange Nase (English: "The long nose") or the like were also collected by Louis Curtze, from Berndorf, August Ey, in Oberharze; Wilhelm Wisser, in Silesia (German: De Prinzessin mit de lang' Nes').

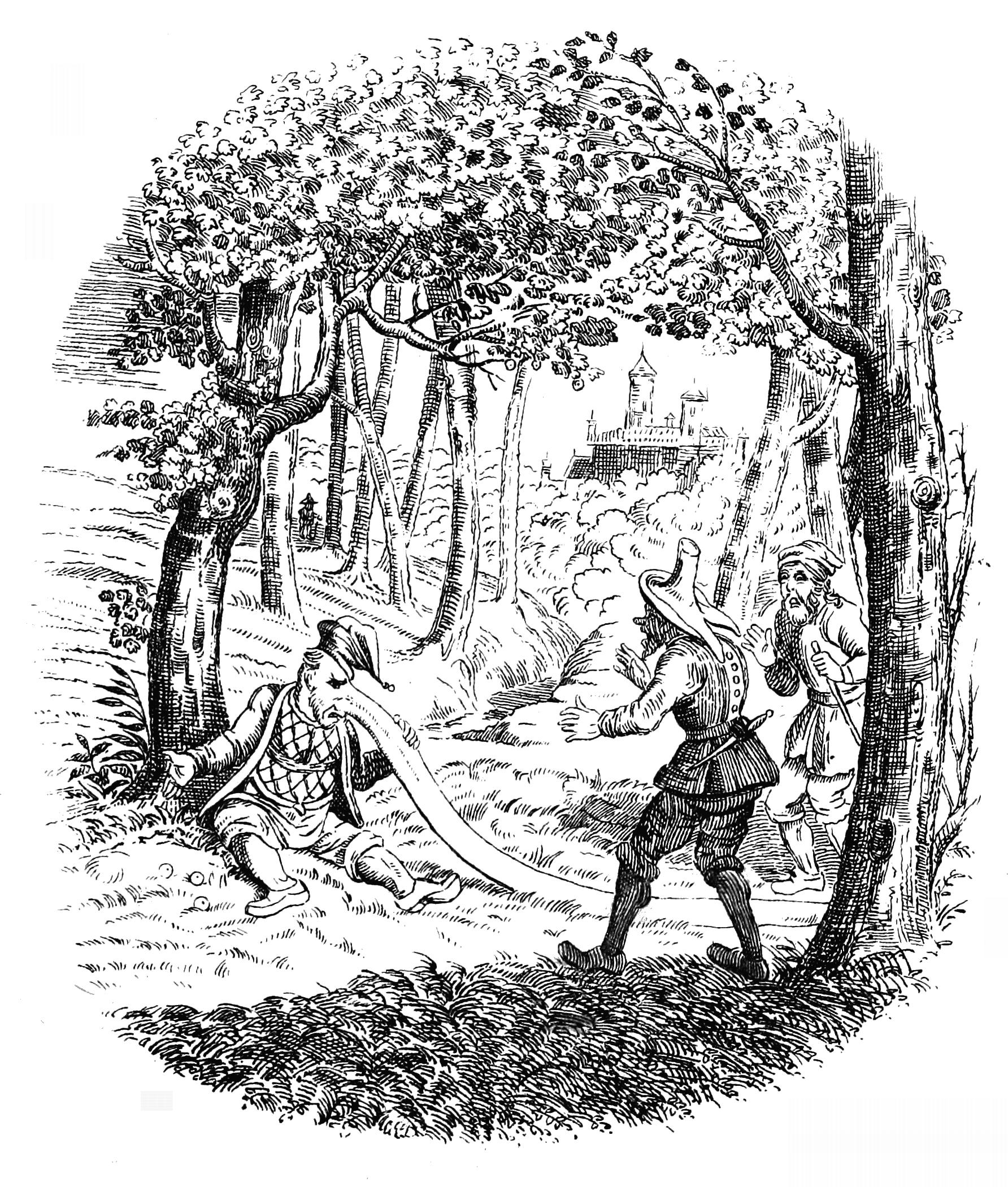
The soldiers experiment the effects of the nose-enlarging fruits. Illustration by George Cruikshank for Grimm's Goblins, by Edgar Taylor (1823).

A Hessian variant was collected by the Brothers Grimm, but not published in their famous collection. Instead, it found its place in the third volume of their Kinder- und Hausmärchen (1856 publication), which contained their annotations on the tales: three soldiers stand guard in a forest at night and receive the items from a short old man. The Brothers Grimm version was translated into the English language as The Nose, by Edgar Taylor, as The Three Soldiers and the Dwarf, by Laura Valentine, as The Nose-Tree by Marian Edwardes, in her 1912 publication, and as Red Jacket, or, The Nose Tree, in a book illustrated by Leonard Leslie Brooke. The Nose Tree was supposedly collected from Dorothea Viehmann ("Zwehrn"), a regular contributor of tales to the Brothers Grimm.

A version by Heinrich Pröhle (Die Geschenke der Klagefrau) differs in that four soldier brothers are given the magic objects, instead of the usual three heroes.

A variant where the soldier's name is explicitly given as Fortunatus, and the stealing princess is killed, can be found in the newly discovered collection of Bavarian folk and fairy tales of Franz Xaver von Schönwerth, titled The Scorned Princess (German: Der Wunderbeutel, das Wünschhütchen und das Wunderhorn).

A literary treatment of the legend of Fortunatus is present in the work of Johann Karl August Musäus: his Volksmärchen der Deutschen contains the story of Rolands Knappen ("Roland's Squires"). A French translation (Les Écuyers de Roland) can be found in Contes de Museäus (1826). In a short summary: three military companions, in a crusade against "infidels", take shelter in a cavern with an old lady who gifts them the purse, a mantle and a gauntlet. At the end of the tale, they never recover the objects, and rejoin the army to avenge their fallen leader, Roland.

A variant from Merano, Beutel, Hütlein und Pfeiflein, was collected by Ignaz and Joseph Zingerle.

Johann Reinhard Bünker collected a variant from the Heanzisch dialect, transcribing the dialect (Ta' Këinich van Rous'npea'ch).

There are variants where the hero does not marry the princess that cheats him out of the magical objects. Instead, he returns to the house where he gained the magical items and marries the donor (an enchanted maiden), as in a tale from Lower Saxony, Die Prinzessin mit dem Horne (English: "The Princess with Horns").

==== Austria ====
In an Austrian variant, collected by the Zingerle Brothers in Zillertal (Vom reichen Ritter und seinen Söhnen), the father, a famous and beloved local lord, dies and his sons discover the secret of their fortune (the three magical objects: a pipe, a green hat and a ring).

==== The Netherlands ====
A version of the tale, titled De appels van Damasko (English: "The apples of Damascus"), was sent in 1894 to the collection of Dutch philologist Gerrit Jacob Boekenoogen. Another version was collected in 1901, narrated by a pair of siblings about a pair of brothers that inherit a magic flute and a magic cap, and the magical fruits are pears.

Another variant where pears are the transforming fruits is Van het tooverbeurzeken, het tooverstoksken en het tooverhoedje ("The magical purse, the magical wand and the magical hat").

A recent study attested the presence of popular trickster hero Anansi, of West African folklore, in a ATU 566 tale collected from Creole inhabitants of the Netherlands.

==== Belgium ====
In a tale collected from Wallonia, L'arbre a cornes, ou Le cuisinier sans paireil, three brothers stay the night at a haunted inn and each of them receives a gift: a cloak, a tablecloth and the purse. The youngest borrows the other two objects from his elder brothers and teleports to another kingdom. There, he employs himself as a cook for the princess's wedding feast. The princess steals the objects but he regains them with the aid of nose-enlarging prunes.

In a Flemish variant, Van Siepe, Sappe en Sijpe, the titular soldiers return from war with the three magical objects: the inexhaustible purse, a teleporting cloak and a cane that can summon an army. The trio use the items to rule over the native village, which attracts the attention of the king to put a stop to the situation. The princess suggests the king invites the three soldiers for a banquet. The soldiers then drink until they pass out. The princess then seizes the opportunity to take the objects and expel the drunken trio from the palace.

==== France ====
The Brothers Grimm, in the annotations to their tales, mentioned the existence of "an old French fabliau" version, with no further information.

Andrew Lang included a French variant in his The Green Fairy Book ("The Little Soldier"), which he obtained from Charles Deulin (titled Le Petit Soldat).

Henry Carnoy collected a variant from Warloy-Baillon, titled La bague magique, where the protagonist enlarges the nose of the princess with a ring and a spell.

Emmanuel Cosquin collected two variants from Lorraine: La bourse, le sifflet et le chapeau and a nameless variant in his annotations.

Two variants from Brittany were collected by François-Marie Luzel (Le laboureur, le prêtre et le clerc, ou La bourse, la serviette et le manteau) and Paul Sébillot (Les cornes enchantées). Sébillot also published two abridged versions in Revue de traditions populaires: Les poires qui font les cornes and La serviette, le manteau et la bourse.

Another variant was collected in Brittany by Adolphe Orain (Coeur de pigeon, "The pigeon's heart"): a poor boy is adopted by a fairy who lives in the woods. The fairy helps her adopted child to win the hand of the princess.

Abbot Leopold Dardy collected two tales from Albret (Labrit) and Gascony: Pipéto ("Pipette") and Lous trés hillos de là hadéto ("Les trois filleuls de la fée").

In the 20th century, French ethnologist Genevieve Massignon collected another variant, from the Pyrenees, titled Les trois déserteurs. In a second variant, from Central France, collected by Henri Pourrat (La demoiselle au long nez; English: "The Damsel with the Long Nose"), the protagonist is given the magical objects by a miller's daughter, and at the conclusion of the tale uses the items to return to the humble maiden, choosing her over the haughty princess. A third modern variant, collected by Achille Millien (Le Roi de Russie et le roi d'Espagne), was among the tales collected from Morvan and Nivernais.

==== Basque country ====
Wentworth Webster collected a Basque version called Dragon and, on a footnote, noted the parallel to John Francis Campbell's "The Three Soldiers" and its wide diffusion.

==== Eastern Europe ====
Folkloristic scholarship on Russian folk tales acknowledges the spread of the tale type "in East Slavic tradition".

A tale from Bukovina, collected from Gypsy populations (The Seer), mixes two sources of physical transformation: figs and the water from a stream. The tale is also part of the "Three Stolen Princesses" type: three brothers/heroes rescue three princesses from a subterranean hideout.

In West Slavic sources, a version of the Slavic witch Baba Yaga, named Jezibaba, appears as an antagonist in a version of the ATU 566.

===== Russia =====
Professor Andrejev noted that the tale type 566, "The Horns", showed 22 variants in Russia.

An early version in Russian was recorded in "Старая погудка на новый лад" (1794-1795), with the name "Сказка об Иване-гостином сыне" ("The Tale of Ivan, the guest son"): the story of two brothers, one eats the head of a magic bird and the other the heart. The one who ate the heart goes into the forest and resolves a dispute over magical objects (one of which is the purse) and escapes in a magic carpet to another kingdom.

Russian folktale collector Alexander Afanasyev compiled three variants of the tale, under the banner "Рога" (Roga; "Horns").

Emmanuel Cosquin cited a Russian version from author A. A. Erlenwein, which was translated by Angelo de Gubernatis in his Florilegio with the name I tre Soldati ("The three soldiers").

In another Russian variant, Bronze Brow, the tsarevich is expelled from home by the tsar because he let a creature named "Bronze Brow" escape. In his travels, he plays cards with the devil and wins the inexhaustible purse. Later on, a tsarevna and her father, who like to play cards, conspire to steal the magic purse.

In another Russian variant, "Офицеръ и барыня" ("The Officer and the Lady"), collected by Ivan Khudyakov (ru), an officer and a soldier desert from the army and camp out in a forest. A small forest creature meets the officer during three nights and gives him a tablecloth, a ring of invisibility and an inexhaustible wallet. They bet the items against a rich lady and lose them. The officer then wanders through the forest and finds some berries. After he eats the fruits, many horns grow on his body.

===== Ukraine =====
Professor Andrejev noted that the tale type 566, "The Horns", showed 7 variants in Ukraine.

In a Ukrainian tale collected by folklorist Petro Lintur from Khust with the title "Сын лесника" ("The Forester's Son"), a forester keeps watch over a forest. On his deathbed, he tells his three sons to take over his job, but warn them never to enter the forest. After he dies, the youngest son, Mykola, suggests he and his brothers venture in to the forest, named Dead Forest, despite their father's prohibition. And so they go. One night, they stop to rest, and the elder brother has the first watch. A forest spirit appears; the elder brother aims a gun at him, but the forest spirit begs to be spared and gives him a cap of invisibility. The same happens to the middle brother, who gains a magic pipe that summons an infinite amount of armed regiments, and Mikola, who gains a magic inexhaustible purse. They make their way of the forest and into an open field. They compare the gifts the forest spirit gave them, and, with the magic purse, buy themselves a large estate and live in luxury. The elder brothers find wives for themselves, and Mykola goes to another city, where he bets with a beautiful princess. He loses the cap of invisibility the first time, and borrows the magic purse to bet an inordinate amount of money against the princess, who exchanges the purse for a normal one and expels Mykola from the kingdom. He then borrows the magic pipe and tries to force the princess to return the objects, but she also steals the magic pipe. Mykola is sentenced with death, but the princess mitigates the sentence by having him blinded and dropped off in the forest. Mykola is guided to a forest, where he finds apples that make horns grow, pears that make them fall, and water of life that restores his sight. Mykola takes thea apples and pears, returns to the kingdom and sells the former to the princess and her parents. Horns grow on their heads; Mykola disguises himself as a doctor and goes to court to cure the royal family; but reserves a special punishment for the princess until she return the three objects she stole. After he gains the objects back, Mykola heals the princess and they marry.

===== Poland =====
Polish ethnographer Stanisław Ciszewski (pl) collected a variant from Smardzowice, titled O trzech braciach, którym królewna kradnie cudowne przedmioty, za co wyrastają jej rogi ("About three brothers, from which a princess steals items and on whom horns grow"), where the three brothers gain a cloak of invisibility, a whistle to summon an army and magical shoes. The princess steals the items, the youngest brother who gained the shoes uses magic apples to retrieve the items and does not marry the princess.

===== Czech Republic =====
In a Czech version, The Soldier and the Devil, a soldier meets three beggars on his way and gives each a penny. Seeing his generosity, God gives him three items: a self-igniting pipe, a knapsack that forces people to enter it with one specific command and the never-emptying purse. The soldier was also a skilled cardplayer and wanted to bet with a card-playing princess. Ending at a draw, the princess resorts to stealing the items while the soldier is asleep.

In another Czech variant, The Cuirassier and the Horned Princess, translated by Jeremiah Curtin, twelve soldiers desert their regiment and pass the night in a sorceress's house. Nine of them die that night for disobeying the sorceress's orders to not open the boxes they received. The three survivors are allowed to leave the house with their boxes by the sorceress. They soon find a mantle, a cap and the purse. The tale was first collected by Benes Method Kulda, with the title O jednom kyrysarovi ("About one cuirassier").

In a Moravian version, Princezna Tuta s dlouhým nosem ("Princess Tuta with the long nose"), a poor king reveals to his son the secret of his fortune, buried an apple tree, and dies. His son soon digs under the tree and finds three chests with three treasures: the purse, a belt that can teleport and a whistle to summon an army. He tries to use the objects to impress the princess from a neighbouring kingdom, who steals the items. Later the prince tries to kill himself, but finds a pear tree with the nose-enlarging fruits and a stream whose water unmakes the transformation.

In another Moravian variant, O třech vojácích ("About three soldiers"), a drummer, a soldier and a corporal desert the army and pass the night in a house in the forest. Inside the house, the soldiers are greeted by three cursed princesses, who ask the three men to help her break their curse. After three nights, the men depart, but not before giving them a sword that can summon an army, a teleporting cloak and the purse. Soon after, the men arrive in a city where the princess steals the items from them. The soldiers then decide to get new jobs. One day, the three find a magic candle that can summon a spirit. They use the spirit to retrieve the magic objects and expel the princess and her father and reign in their place.

==== Slovakia ====
Linguist Jiri Polívka analysed two Slovak variants, wherein three brothers enter an enchanted castle and see three enchanted maidens, who asks for their help in breaking the curse of the castle. The brothers fail, yet are still rewarded with the magical items. In the first variant, the three men never return to the castle, but one of the brothers, named Janko, uses the magical fruits (pears) on a princess and marries her. In another, the items are stolen by a taverner's daughter and are given back when the fruits are used (apples and pears). In this second variant, the brothers return to the enchanted castle and disenchant the princesses.

==== Hungary ====
Hungarian folktale collections attest a few variants: A szent leányok ajándéka ("The gifts of the fairies"); A három szerencsepróbáló ("The three trials of fortune"), collected by Elek Benedek.

In a Csángo tale titled A három mirha, a mother gifts three things for her third and youngest son (a golden watch, a golden necklace and a necktie). The youth becomes infatuated with a woman, who steals his belongings. Later, he discovers a stream whose water makes one ill and apples that make one healthy.

In the tale A két árva királyfi ("The Two Orphaned Princes"), the stepmother queen wants to eat the liver and the heart of her stepchildren's pet bird. Princes Miklós and András eat the organs: Miklós becomes a king and András marries the youngest daughter of a foreign king. His wife gives him a cap of invisibility and a magical whip, before he travels to an enchanted castle that belongs to a maiden named Zsófi. Zsófi steals the whip, but prince András uses the cap to embark on a ship that leads him to a distant island. There, the prince finds a grapevine whose blue-black grapes make a millstone appear on the neck, and white grapes that make it disappear.

In the tale Három Nemeslegény ("The Three Noblemen"), three brothers give shelter to an old lady for three times, and every time the old lady rewards them with a gift: the inexhaustible purse, a cap of invisibility and a golden cane that can summon several troops. When they continue on their journey, they arrive at a city where a princess likes to gamble in card games. One of the brothers bets and loses the purse and the cap, and the princess tricks him out of the golden cane. Later, he sleeps underneath a tree and the old lady appears in his dreams to advise him to use magic apples and water from a magical spring to regain the objects.

==== Romania ====
A tale titled Härstäldai was collected from Romania and pertains to the ATU 566 tale-type: the soldier spends the night in a hut that belongs to the devil. Unflinching, the soldier menaces the creature with his gun and receives the magic purse.

In a second variant (German: Drei Spieler; English: "Three Players" or "Three Gamblers"), collected by Pauline Schullerus, three brothers, gamblers, acquire the magic items from a mysterious woman in a house in the forest. The youngest gains the magical purse and loses it to a princess. As a payback, he does not cure her of the horns when he gets his items back.

A variant from the Aromanian language, named Căciula, punga și trâmbița ("The Cap, the Purse and the Horn"), was collected and published in 1967, in a series of Romanian storybooks titled Povești nemuritoare. The tale is part of Volume 5 (ro).

In another Romanian variant, Doftorul Toderaș, collected by author Ion Pop-Reteganul (ro), three soldier brothers camp out in the woods at night. When each of them keep the night watch, a man driving a wagon with four black horses appears and gifts the brothers the purse, a horn and a little straw hat.

==== Southern Europe ====
Parker Fillmore translated a tale from South Europe titled Beauty and the Horns: The Story of an Enchanted Maiden.

The tale is attested in Pomaks oral tradition, but instead of figs, the usual fruits of the tale-type, the main character uses grapes to cause the condition.

==== Italy ====
A scholarly inquiry by Italian Istituto centrale per i beni sonori ed audiovisivi ("Central Institute of Sound and Audiovisual Heritage"), produced in the late 1960s and early 1970s, found fourteen variants of the tale across Italian sources. Studies suggest the distribution of the tale through Italy may have originated from a 17th-century translation of the German novel by abbot Pompeo Sarnelli.

Sicilian folklorist Giuseppe Pitrè collected a Sicilian variant named La vurza, lo firriolu e lu cornu 'nfatatu ("The purse, the cloak and the enchanted horn"). In his commentaries, he also listed two short variants, and commented on similar tales found in the works of fellow folklorists Laura Gonzenbach and Vittorio Imbriani. The Sicilian version was later translated to German by Waldemar Kaden as Beutel, Mäntelchen und Wunderhorn and included in Fiabe italiane by Italo Calvino as tale nr. 189. La Reginetta cornuta ("The Princess with horns").

Giuseppe Pitrè collected a second Sicilian variant named Petru, lu Massariotu, in which a poor man gambles with the princess the magical items he received, loses them and gets thrown in prison, where he learns from the other prisoners the tricks of the cheating princess. He also collected a Tuscan variant named Soldatino, with notes to other existing Italian and European versions.

Laura Gonzenbach, folklorist of Swiss origin, collected two Sicilian versions of the tale: Die Geschichte von Ciccu ("The Story of Ciccu") and Von dem Schäfer, der die Königstochter zum Lachen brachte.

Vittorio Imbriani collected a version from Firenze (Il Figliolo del Pecoraio), with mentions to variants contained in Gesta Romanorum, in Laura Gonzenbach and Pitré, four variants from Pomogliano d'Arco ('E Corna, La Coa, A' Reggenella and Lu Cunto ri Tre Frati) and a variant from Milan (La coa).

Thomas Frederick Crane published another version, The Shepherd Who Made the King's Daughter Laugh, which he translated from Laura Gonzenbach's book of Italian folktales (compiled originally in German).

Angelo de Gubernatis commented on a nameless narrative, in Zoological Mythology, which was collected in Osimo. Instead of the figs that grow horns, they grow a tail on the deceiving princess. At the end of the tale, the poor brother regains the magical items the princess stole, but he does not heal the princess.

Gherardo Nerucci collected a Montalese variant, titled I fichi brogiotti, where there are three poor brothers who sleep in the woods and dream of the fabled objects. When they wake up, an old man gifts each brother the respective item they saw in their dreams.

Gennaro Finamore collected a variant from Abruzzi, named Lu fatte de le tre ffàte.

British traveller Rachel Harriette Busk collected two versions in Rome: Dodici Palmi di Naso ("Twelve Feet of Nose") and Mezza Canna di Naso ("A Yard of Nose"). She also collected a third Roman variant, titled The Transformation-Donkey, mixing the ATU 566 story (donkey-transformation herbs) with ATU 567 (brothers eat the organs of bird).

Carolina Coronedi-Berti wrote down a variant from Bologna (La fola del Nan), and compared it to Gonzenbach's and Imbriani's versions.

Scholar Jack Zipes classifies Venetian tale Der arme Fischerknabe ("The poor fisherman's son") as pertaining to the ATU 566 tale type: poor Almerigo witnesses a quarrel in the forest about an invisibility cloak, the never-emptying purse and a pair of fast travelling shoes.

Heinrich Zschalig collected a tale from Capri (Pfeife, Geldbeutel und Feder), where the magic objects (pipe, purse and feather) are inherited by three brothers and it is the king who steals the items.

A version from Livorno, Il fico boddone, related to the plot of Frutta che fanno crescere il naso (English: "Fruits that make the nose grow"), is reported to have been collected, but otherwise remains inedited.

A variant from Trentino (La Regina dalla coda) was collected by Nepomuceno Bolignini: there are two brothers who receive the magic purse and a cloak of invisibility.

==== Spain ====
Hispanist Ralph Steele Boggs listed the occurrence of the tale in two compilations: one in A. de Llano Roza de Ampudia's Cuentos asturianos ("Las tres prendas de Pedro"), and other in A. M. Espinosa (Sr.)'s Cuentos populares españoles ("El tonto lagañoso, magañoso").

Aurelio M. Espinosa, Jr. in a 1993 article, analysed the tale collection of Castilla y León, and affirmed that the tale type AT 566 is "muy difundido" ("widespread").

A Galician version titled Un novo papa en Roma e un novo rei en España (English: "A new Pope in Rome and a new king of Spain") was collected in late 20th century.

===== Mallorca =====
Majorcan writer Antoni Maria Alcover, in the tradition of Catalan rondayes, collected three variants of ATU 566: Fruita fora temps: figues flor per a Nadal (in Volume X), La Reina banyuda (in Volume 11) and Dos fiis de viuda (in Volume 15).

In another variant from Mallorca, Sa Cadeneta (Das Kettchen), is singular in that the peasant brother uses the fruits (pears and figs) before the count's daughter (the princess-like character in this variant) steals the magical items. Actually, there is no stealing in this version: the brother uses the items to impress the count and ask for his daughter's hand in marriage.

==== Greece ====
Johann Georg von Hahn collected a tale from Zagori, in Epirus, Greece (Von den Feigen, die Hörner erzeugen und Hörner vertreiben), and compared the characters in the tale to a Servian variant and a Romanian one.

Richard M. Dawkins collected a variant from Phloïtá (The Magic Bird) in which the hero forces both the horns and the donkey transformations on the characters.

In the 20th, scholar Georgios A. Megas collected another variant (Das Pfeifchen und das Mützchen).

==== Lithuania ====
In a Lithuanian variant (Lithuanian: Stebuklingi obuolėliai; English: "Wonderful apples"), the wonderful fruits that cause the bodily transformation are apples. Professor Bronislava Kerbelyte states the existence of 114 variants collected from all over Lithuania, several of them with contamination from other tale-types.

==== Latvia ====
In a Latvian variant collected in 1877, "О царѣ и трехъ унаслѣдованныхъ вещахъ" ("The tsar and the three inheritances"), a tsar dies and leaves to his three sons three relics: a belt that transports the wearer where he wishes to go; a purse that grants an unlimited amount of coins, and a horn that summons an army. With the belt and the purse, one of the king's sons travels to a princess's bedchambers. She manages to trick him into giving her the objects. Later, he returns with the horn, which the princess also manages to take from him. After he is expelled from the palace, the tsar's son finds a tree with nose-enlarging fuits.

==== Estonia ====
Andrew Lang collected an Estonian variant, titled Tiidu the Piper, in The Crimson Fairy Book. The story tells of a piper who, at a later point in the tale, gets stranded on an island after a shipwreck and eats the nose-enlarging fruits. A previous English version (1895) was published as Tiidu, the Flute-Player by William Forsell Kirby, which had even noted the effects of the Nose-tree fruits. The tale was first published by Friedrich Reinhold Kreutzwald in Ehstnische Mährchen (1869), named Dudelsack-Tiddu. Kreutzwald even noticed the similarities of the episode with the fruits to that of Fortunatus.

==== Finland ====
A Finnish tale, collected in Karelia (Das Teufelsschiff; English: "The Devil's Ship"), begins with a poor farmer finding a self-moving golden ship in the forest with devils. He distracts them and takes the marvellous objects for himself, setting sail for a king's castle, where he invites the princess on a ride on the magical ship. When they arrive on an island, the princess abandons him and takes the objects, while he finds the horn-growing berries. The tale was first collected by Eero Salmelainen, titled Hiiden laiva, and translated int English editions with the name Hidden Laiva (sic) or the Golden Ship.

==== Denmark ====
A variant titled Svend's Exploits was translated by Benjamin Thorpe, from the work of Carit Etlar.

A second variant, De lange Næser (English: "The long noses") was collected by Evald Tang Kristensen and included in his folktale collection Tales from Jutland.

==== Iceland ====
The Icelandic variant (German: Die ungetreue Dienerin; English: "The unfaithful servant") was given by Adeline Rittershaus in abbreviated form: the hero is a prince (son of a king), and the objects are lost due to the carelessness of a servant.

==== Norway ====
A variant named The Magic Apples was collected by Klara Stroebe. In this variant, the protagonist just happens to previously own a self-setting tablecloth, the purse and a wishing cap.

Ornul Hodne, in his 1984 publication of Norwegian folktales, classified Underepla as ATU 566.

==== Armenia ====
Author Frédéric Macler translated into French an Armenian variant titled La belle de Tiflis, further translated into English as by folklorist Lucy Garnett as The Princess of Tiflis, and A. G. Seklemian as The World's Beauty. In this tale, the hero is the son of a rich merchant and is instructed never to reveal the secret of the family's wealth: the magical purse.

In another Armenian tale, The Peasant's Son and the King's Daughter, a peasant rescues the son of the King of Snakes (a snake) and is gifted a fez, a fife and a tobacco pouch. The peasant dies and his son inherits the objects. When he uses them for the first time, the fez grants invisibility, the fife summons an army and the tobacco pouch always replenishes itself with money. The King's daughter steals the items, but the hero wins them back with white and red grapes that transform one into a buffalo.

==== Georgia ====
Georgian scholarship registers variants of type 566, "The Horns", in Georgia. According to their tale index, the objects that cause the physical transformation are "wonderful plants".

==== Tatar people ====
In a tale from the Tatar people titled "Младший сын" ("The Youngest Son"), a father, on his deathbed, asks his three sons - the youngest considered a fool - to hold a vigil on his grave for three nights, one son on each night. The eldest son goes first and his father's spirit gives him a cloak of invisibility. Next, the middle son gets a cow horn that summons an army, and the youngest a magic purse. Later, the local padishah announces a challenge: anyone is to have a contest in measuring fortunes with him, and he who proves he is richer than the padishah, shall marry his daughter. The youngest son goes to the padishah's palace with the magic purse and produces an infinite amount of coins. The youngest son marries the padishah's daughter, who dislikes her husband and, out of curiosity, asks him the secret of the purse. The youngest naïvely answers her, and she plots with some guards to steal the purse, beat the man and expel him from the palace. It happens thus. The youngest brother asks the middle one to borrow the army-summoning horn to get his revenge on his wife. She also steals the horn. Lastly, he borrows the cloak of invisibility and sneaks into the castle, but he also loses the cloak. After the third time, the padishah's daughter orders her husband to be abandoned in some remote remote island. The man is left to die on an island, and finds three trees: one whose fruits make one beautiful, another whose fruits make expensive clothes appear, and a third whose fruits make large horns appear on the head. By listening to two birds, he learns of a fourth tree whose fruits make the horns disappear. The birds also talk about how the leaves of the fourth tree have buoying properties. The man gathers the fruits and uses the leaves to cross the sea back to his wife, so he can use the fruits on her.

Author James Riordan translated another Tatar tale with the title The Tale of the Three Talismans. In this tale, a poor father lives in an aul by the margins of Lake Baikal with his three starving sons. One day, he takes a hunting gun to shoot some game. He sights a strange, large bird by a tree. The bird begs the man to be spared and gives him a magic cloth that produces food. Some time later, the khan stops by their hunt on a hunt and asks for food. The man waves the cloth and produces a feast before the khan. The khan returns to his palace and learns he has to host foreign envoys, so he sends for the same peasant man that prepared the feast before him. The peasant man sends his son Osman in his stead with the magic cloth. After the feast, the khan plans to discover the peasant's secret, and goads him into marrying his daughter, princess Isharad. The princess marries Osman and he shows her he cloth. She steals the object for her father, and the khan orders Osman to be locked in prison. Back to the peasant, he goes to hunt again, meets the same bird and is given a magic purse that produces golden coins. He loans the purse to his second son Mustafa, who goes to the khan's court to finance a new palace for him. Mustafa also marries princess Isharad, who steals the purse for her father. Lastly, the peasant meets the bird a third time and is given a golden arrow that always lands on its target. The peasant gives it to his youngest son, named Taz-Oglan, who uses the golden arrow to defeat an enemy army and marries Isharad. Once again, the princess learns the secret of her husband and steals the object for her father. Taz-Oglan, in desperation, flees his spouse's palace into the forest. There, he eats any type of berries and fruits, including ripe figs that make horns grow on his head. By using leaves from a bush, the horns fall off. With his newfound knowledge, Taz-Oglan goes back to the khan, punishes him and the princess, releases his brothers from prison and becomes the new khan.

==== Karachay-Balkar people ====
In a tale from the Karachay-Balkars with the title "Пасынок" ("Stepson"), a man remarries, and his new wife hates her young stepson, so the youth asks his sister to prepare some food for the road, for he will try his luck in the world. He journeys alone and meets three giants-emegen quarreling about their inheritance, three magical objects: a wagon that takes the user where he wishes to go, a cap of invisibility, and a "sakis", a type of chewing gum that, when spat out, produces gold. The youth tricks the giants and steals the objects, then goes to a royal city. He sees the city's beautiful princess from a distance, and falls in love with her. Because she has been kept hidden from the world, many would pay to see her. The youth then spits out gold with the sakis and pays some maidservants to be allowed access to the princess. They enjoy each other's company, but the princess gets him drunk and he reveals the secret of his fortune: the sakis. She steals the sakis and tosses the youth out of the city with the wagon and the hat. Eventually, she repeats her trick and steals the remaining objects from him. He decides to leave the city and finds work with some stupid giants. He helps them in harvesting their grains and is allowed to eat some fruits from their orchard: pears, carobs and apples. He picks and eats them: the pear turns him into a buffalo, the carob enlarges his horns, and the apples restore him to human form. Inspired by the transformation, he takes some of the fruits and goes back to the city to sell them to the princess.

=== North America ===
==== Native ====
Folklorist Stith Thompson analysed a variant collected among the native North Americans ("The Magic Apples").

In a Penobscot tale, Story of Jack the Soldier, a soldier named Jack defects and is joined by a captain and a corporal. They see an illuminated house in the distance. After spending he night, they see three enchanted maidens who give them three gifts: a food-providing tablecloth, a money-providing wallet and a cap of transportation. Jack uses the cap and takes them to London. He falls in love with a woman of status and tries to woo her by using the objects. She steals the items and abandons him. Jack finds magic apples that grow a tree on his head. He returns to London on a ship and uses the apples on the woman. She returns the items and is left to die. Jack and his companions return to disenchant the maidens.

==== Canada ====
French folklorist Henry Carnoy obtained a variant titled Les Figues Merveilleuses ("The Wonderful Figs") from Canada.

Marius Barbeau collected a variant titled La Princesse de Tomboso, from a man named Joseph Mailloux, and a second variant, unpublished at the time.

In a Woods Cree tale, The Man and the Berries, a man who was studying to be part of the Anglican Church decides to abandon his studies after a prank by some students. He meets an old woman on his journey. They eat and drink together and she gives him a box that provides money and a belt of transportation. After arriving at a town, he decides to play cards with a local woman. He loses the belt and the box, but decides to use the belt to transport them to an island. The woman steals the belt and returns to the city. The man finds the berries that grow horns and builds a raft to return to the city. He uses the berries on the woman to make grow horns on her head, and, after restoring her to normal, marries her.

==== United States ====
A version was collected among German-speaking populations living in Pennsylvania, being a unique composition of types made by the storyteller.

A variant was collected by researcher Susie Hoogasian-Villa amongst Armenian descent populations of the United States, in Detroit: The Magic Figs.

==== Mexico ====
Professor Stanley Robe collected, in 1947, a variant named La fruta extranjera (English: "The foreign fruit") from a 24-year-old housewife from Tepatitlán de Morelos, Jalisco who provided many tales, later published in 1970. In this version, the hero inherits a little sombrero and the purse, and the pair of magic fruits are bananas and prunes.

=== Central America ===
British traveller Rachel Harriette Busk registered a version from Matanzas, in Cuba, about a family man named Perrico, who is given the purse, a tablecloth and a stick from a sprite (a goblin).

In a variant collected in Costa Rica with the name Prince Simpleheart, the magical objects are an invisibility cloak, the money knapsack and a violin that forces people to dance.

Anthropologist Elsie Clews Parsons recorded a tale from Saint Lucia titled Petit fille mangé pomme la, y tou'né yun choval (English: "The young woman ate a fruit and became a horse").

=== Asia ===
==== Middle East ====
Scholar Ulrich Marzolph points that Maronite storyteller Hanna Diyab had in his repertoire of narratives - according to Antoine Galland's diary - an as of yet unpublished version of type 566: The Purse, the Dervish's Horn, the Figs, and the Horns.

A variant in the Mehri language (German: Die Stiefmutter und der Vogel; English: The stepmother and the bird) was collected and published at the turn of the 20th century.

==== Iran ====
A Persian variant, The Story of Magic Bird, mixes the motif of the ATU 567 with the magical objects the hero steals from his step-brothers by trickery.

==== India ====
Reverend James Hinton Knowles collected a variant from Kashmir titled Saiyid and Said: two poor brothers eat the head and breast of a golden bird and gain special abilities. They go their separate ways: one becomes a king; the other gets romantically involved with a beautiful woman who betrays him twice (the second time, she steals the magic objects and, as a payback, is turned into an ass for her troubles).

A Bengali variant was collected by William MacCulloch, titled Learning and Motherwit: the princess is transformed into a monkey by the use of special leaves in her bath.

A variant was collected from India in the 20th century, by tale collector A. K. Ramajunan, with the title Three Magic Objects, originally in the Kannada language.

Writer Adeline Rittershaus pointed to the existence of an "Hindustani" version published in the 1865 edition of Revue orientale et americaine: L'Inexorable Courtisane et Les Talismans, whose translation was provided by Garcin de Tassy.

Natesa Sastri registered a Dravidian variant where twins brothers eat the peel and seed of a special fruit, thus setting each of them on a grand destiny. The younger of the two collects the four magical items a dying sage left to his disciples, but loses them to the trickery of two courtesans. He eventually discovers a four-branched mango tree, a fruit of each branch causing a transformation: black ape, kite, old woman and back into his normal self.

==== China ====
Folklorist Joseph Jacobs saw a parallel of the tale of Fortunatus in a Chinese translation of the Buddhist Tripitaka, where the monk is given a magic jug.

Chinese folklorist and scholar Ting Nai-tung established a second typological classification of Chinese folktales (the first was by Wolfram Eberhard in the 1930s). In his new system, he noted other magical items (e.g., hoe that produces silver from the ground, a cloak that helps cross water safely), and there are other types of fruits that cause the transformation.

Missionary Adele M. Fielde transcribed a Chinese tale from Guangdong (The Three Talismans) where a poor man goes to an island and is gifted a cap of invisibility, a cloak of transportation and a basket that replenishes itself with jewels, and the horn-growing fruits are bananas.

==== Korea ====
In a Korean tale, The Long-Nosed Princess, a mother, on her deathbed, divides the family's heirlooms among her three sons: a gold-producing marble to the eldest; a flute that summons a regiment to the second eldest and a ragged cloak of invisibility to the youngest. A princess becomes aware of the treasures and decides to have them all. She invites the first two brothers to her palace, steal the items and throws the brothers in the dungeons. The third brother enter the palace with the cloak of invisibility and discovers in the palace gardens red apples that grow horns and yellow apples that make them disappear. This tale is classed KT 282 in the Koran tale type index.

==== Vietnam ====
A Vietnamese variant is reported to have been collected by F. Zuchelli and published in 1968, in a compilation of Vietnamese folktales.

In a Vietnamese tale titled NGỌC QUÁ ("Precious Gem"), a poor servant falls into many debts due to his gambling, and even the buffalo he takes to graze is confiscated by the creditors. Not risking punishment by his master, he pretends to be dead. Two crows fly overhead and approach the false corpse to peck at the eyes, when the man springs to life and captures one of the crows. The crows begs to be released and promises to give the man a rich treasure: a gem that can grant his wishes. The crow spits the gem. The sighs that he wishes he could have a buffalo, and an animal appears to him. He returns the animal to his master, then goes to a secluded location to wish for a large house for himself, and nearby fields with birds and oxen, which appear to him. He becomes a rich man, and one day he wishes for a wife, and the daughter of a rich village lord appears to marry him. After a while, his wife asks him the secret of his fortune and he reveals the story behind the magic gem. After he sleeps, the woman flees with the gem back to her parents. The man wakes up, realizes his wife and the gem are missing, and goes to a mountaintop to pray. A Buddha hears his pleas and gives him a white flower and a red flower he can use to retrieve the gem. The man leaves the white flower by his wife and his in-laws' house, and its smell cause their noses to enlarge and resemble an elephant's trunk. The family cannot restore their noses to normal, and the man appears with the red flower, demanding his wife returns the gem. The in-laws realize their daughter stole the gem and bid her return it, and in exchange the man uses the red flower's smell to restore them to normal. The man lives with his wife until his death. On his deathbed, the crows return to fetch the gem, then fly away.

==== Philippines ====
Professor Dean Fansler collected two variants from Philippines (The charcoal-maker who became king and Pedro's Fortunes), and suggested its entry in the archipelagical oral tradition from an external source.

=== Africa ===
==== North Africa ====
A version from Kabyle, Ahmed, le fils du charbonnier, is related to the ATU 566 cycle. A second variant (Die kostbaren Eier) was collected by German archeologist Leo Frobenius.

A variant from Egypt (Histoire du musicien ambulant et de son fils) was collected by Guillaume Spitta-Bey in the 19th century and classified by scholar Hasan M. El-Shamy as belonging to the ATU 566 tale-type. Professor Hasan El-Shamy also states the tale type is distributed throughout Egypt, such as in a New Valley variant where the objects are a magic carpet, a tray and a stone, and the fruits, in two versions, are dates and carrots.

==== West Africa ====
Anthropologist Elsie Clews Parsons collected an untitled variant from the Cape Verde Islands that she dubbed Horns from Figs, where the soldier uses the magical objects to kill the princess and the royal family and make himself king of the realm.

==== East Africa ====
In a variant from East Africa, written down by linguist Carl Velten, protagonist Mohamedi obtains cucumbers that grow horns.

In a Swahili variant, The Magic Date Trees, one of two brothers, seduced by a charming woman, is robbed of all his fortune by the woman and abandoned in an island. There, he finds two date trees whose fruits cause the appearance of tusks on one's face.

== See also ==
- Little Muck (German literary fairy tale by Wilhelm Hauff)
- Donkey Cabbages (German fairy tale collected by the Brothers Grimm)
