= Donkey Cabbages =

German fairy tale

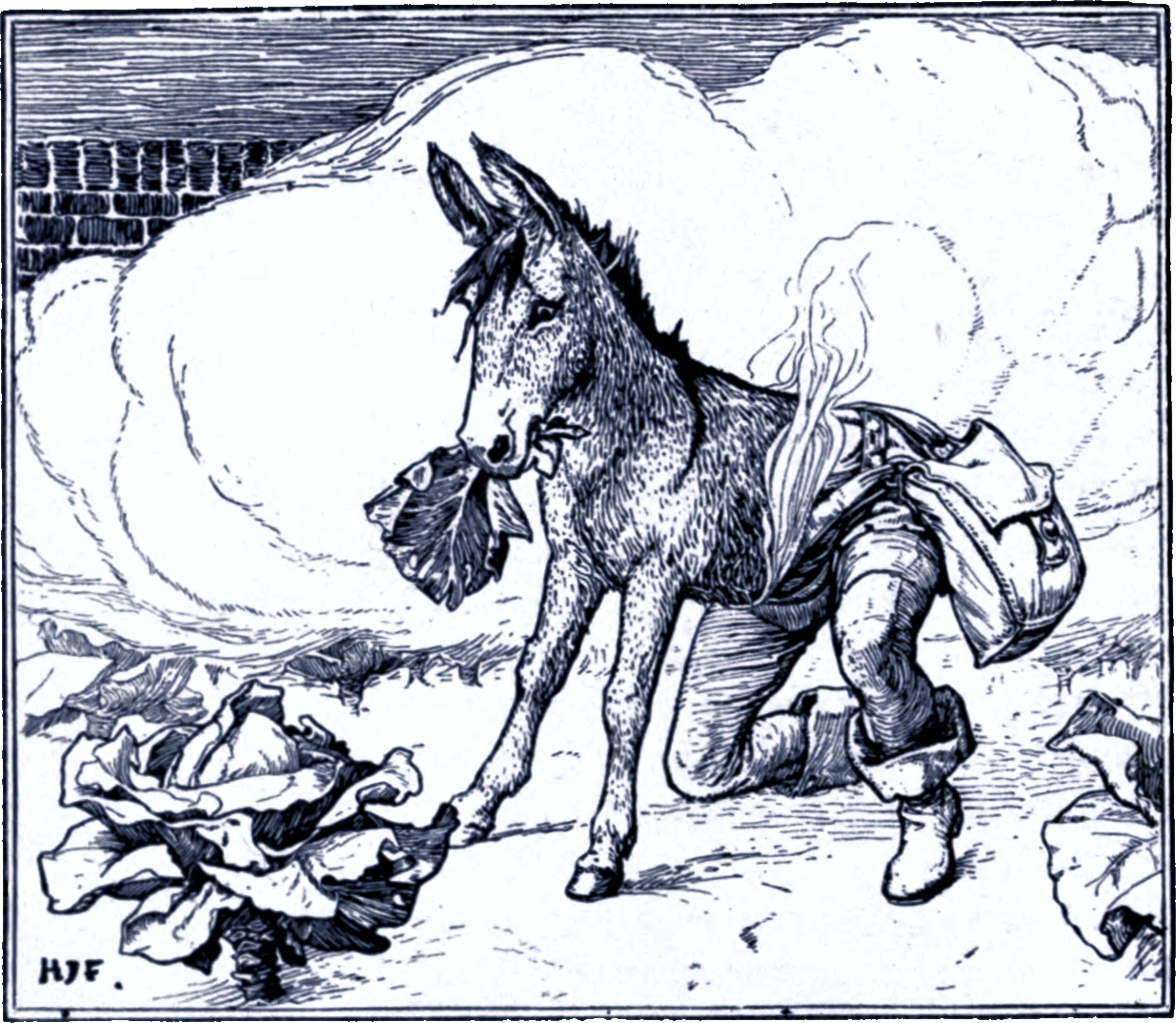
- The effects of the shapeshifting herbs: the man becomes a donkey. Illustration from The Yellow Fairy Book (1894).

Folk tale
- Name: Donkey Cabbages
- Aarne–Thompson grouping: ATU 567 (The Magical Bird-Heart)
- Country: Germany
- Published in: Kinder- und Hausmärchen by the Brothers Grimm
- Related: Fortunatus and his Purse; Little Muck

"Donkey Cabbages" (or "The Donkey Cabbage"; German: Der Krautesel) is a German fairy tale collected by the Brothers Grimm, tale number 122. A man shoots birds in a forest and gains magical objects. By also ingesting the heart of one of the birds he shot, he acquires an inexhaustible source of wealth. Later on, his magical abilities and items are stolen by a trio of witches, but he regains everything thanks to a magical herb that causes one to transform into a donkey.

== Synopsis ==
A huntsman gave an old woman alms. She told him to go to a tree where nine birds fought for a cloak. If he shot among them, one would die and they would drop the cloak that turned out to be a wishing cloak. Furthermore, if he swallowed the heart of the dead bird, he would find a gold coin by his pillow every morning.

He went out into the world and came to a castle where an old witch lived with her beautiful daughter. The witch knew about the bird's heart and told her daughter what she must do to steal it. She gave the huntsman a drink and the bird's heart came up. The daughter swallowed it herself. Then the witch told her that she had to steal the wishing cloak as well and how to do it. The daughter looked at the Garnet Mountain and told the huntsman that she wished she were there. He took her under the cloak and wished them both there. The huntsman slept there and she stole the cloak and wished herself back home.

Three giants saw the huntsman and talked of killing him, but the third said that a cloud would carry him away. He climbed up the mountain and rode off on a cloud. It took him to a cabbage garden. He was so hungry that he ate some and it turned him into a donkey. The huntsman went on and found a different patch of cabbage which turned him back into a human. He took both kinds of vegetables and went back to the castle. The huntsman told the old witch that he was a royal messenger sent to fetch the finest vegetables for the king, but he was afraid that the heat would make it wither. The old witch asked for some. He gave it to her and she, her maidservant, and the daughter all ate the cooked vegetables and became donkeys. The huntsman sold them to a miller, telling him to give the old one (the witch) one meal a day and three beatings, the younger one (the maidservant) three meals and two beatings, and the youngest (the witch's daughter) three meals and one beating.

After a time, he came back to the miller to see how the donkeys were doing. The miller told him that the oldest donkey was dead, but the two younger donkeys were so sad he thought they would die. The huntsman bought them back and turned them back into women. The old witch's daughter told him where the cloak was and said she would give him back the heart as it had been stolen, but he said it would make no difference, if they wed, so they married shortly afterwards.

== Analysis ==
The tale is analysed as part of a series of folk stories connected to the Fortunatus cycle: a soldier is gifted magical items by a fairy (or an old lady, or the goddess of Fortune) but the items are stolen by someone else (a witch, a king, a princess, etc.). With the help of a strange fruit or herb with magical properties, the hero recovers the items. In some variants, the hero eventually marries the thief (if female) or the thief's daughter. These tales are classified in the Aarne–Thompson–Uther Index as ATU 566, "The Three Magic Objects and the Wonderful Fruits".

British traveller Rachel Harriette Busk collected a variant from Rome: The Transformation Donkey.

The beginning of the tale sometimes involves male twins or a pair of brothers that eat the bird's head and heart (or liver, or breast), unaware of its magical properties. One such variant was collected by Hans Stumme, in North Africa (Die Geschichte von den beiden Knaben, die das Herz und den Kopf des Vogels gegessen hatten, und von der Rhalia Bint Manssor).

Variants of the story differ in the kind of vegetable or herb that is ingested, and the sort of physical transformation, mostly into animals. For instance, in a Czechoslovak tale, collected by Parker Fillmore, the protagonist finds a sorrel and is transformed into a goat.

== Translations and versions ==
The Brothers Grimm collected a previous version titled Die lange Nase, with many similarities to this tale.

Andrew Lang included it in The Yellow Fairy Book.

The tale was also translated as The Salad and published in Grimm's Goblins: Grimm's Household Stories, by Edgar Taylor.

Ruth Manning-Sanders included it, as "The Donkey Lettuce", in A Book of Witches.

== In popular culture ==
=== Television ===
- In 1988, the story was also animated by Japan's Nippon Animation studio for its Grimm's Fairy Tale Classics series; the title of the episode in the English version produced by Saban Entertainment is The Magic Heart. It made a few alterations to the story. In The Magic Heart, the huntsman is named Frederick, the witch's daughter is named Lisbeth and is really an enchanted princess whom the witch kidnapped as a baby and raised as her own daughter (even giving Lisbeth the power of black magic), the old woman is replaced with an old wizard, the witch's maidservant as well as the three giants were not featured, and the transformed witch and Lisbeth were sold to a farmer. Instead of a bird's heart, Frederick swallows a golden orb. Additionally the cloak allows its wearer to teleport to any location they wish instead of being a wishing cloak and Lisbeth tricks Frederick into teleporting them to a barren desert as her mother instructed, though Lisbeth protested about the theft of the cloak. Lisbeth then tricks Frederick into believing the cloak made a mistake and convinces him to fetch her some water and steals the cloak when he leaves it with her while planning to search for an oasis only to discover her theft when he realizes they can use the cloak to transport them to somewhere else. Lisbeth is shown to regret leaving Frederick in the desert causing the witch to plan to increase the power of the enchantment on her to make her forget him. The "Magic Heart" of the episode's title is not the heart of a dead bird, but rather the magic of Frederick's heart when he forgives Lisbeth for her transgressions against him after he discovers the farmer he sold her and the witch to had ignored his orders not to work Lisbeth at all and feed three meals a day. The farmer instead cruelly makes Lisbeth work for the three meals he feeds her and whips her. When Frederick confronts him over breaking his word, the farmer reveals that the old donkey that was the witch had died and he had to work the younger one to make up for it, though Frederick takes Lisbeth home for violating the terms of their arrangement. He gives Lisbeth the white cabbage to turn her back into a human and she apologizes to him before revealing that the spell the witch had cast on her had been broken by her death and that she realizes that she was not her real mother. Frederick is also shown to be more torn and heartbroken by Lisbeth's betrayal than the theft of the cloak and golden ball as he states to himself he would have gladly given them to her after she steals the cloak. He is later relieved to learn she hadn't betrayed him willingly as she had been under the witch's enchantment.

== See also ==
- The Two Brothers
