= Old Fortunatus =

Play in a mixture of prose and verse by Thomas Dekker

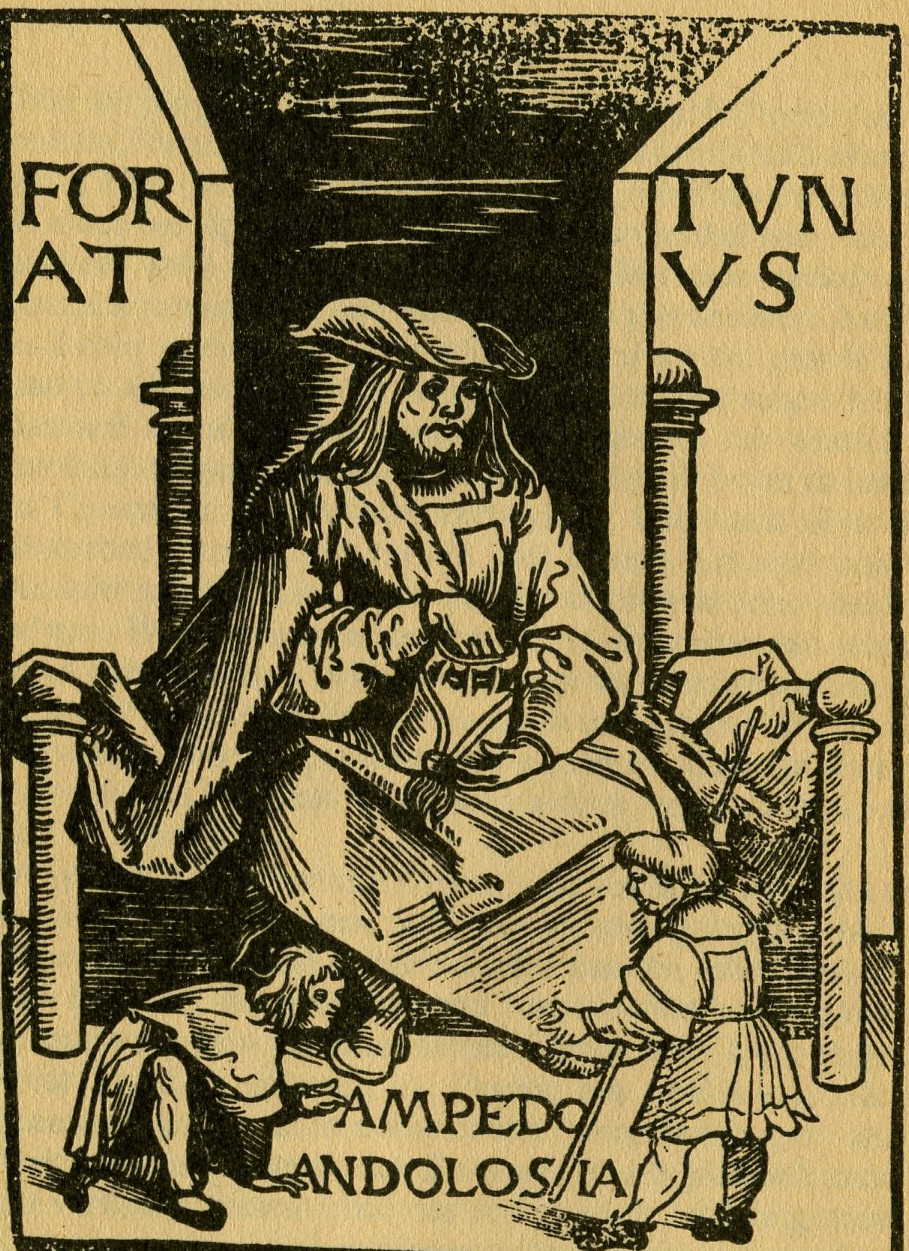

The Pleasant Comedie of Old Fortunatus (1599) is a play in a mixture of prose and verse by Thomas Dekker, based on the German legend of Fortunatus and his magic inexhaustible purse. Though the play is not easy to categorise, it has been called "the only example of an interlude inspired by the fully developed genius of the Renaissance".

== Synopsis ==
Fortunatus, a beggar, meets the goddess Fortune, and she offers him a choice between wisdom, strength, health, beauty, long life, and riches. He chooses riches and is given a purse from which he can take ten pieces of gold at any time. He then takes himself off to Cyprus to visit his two sons, the reckless spendthrift Andelocia and the more prudent and unimaginative Ampedo. To Cyprus also go Fortune and her attendants Vice and Virtue, who plant two trees, Vice's tree being covered with fair fruit while Virtue's tree hardly bears any fruit at all. Fortunatus visits the court of the Soldan of Turkey, where he tricks the Soldan out of his miraculous hat, which has the power of taking the wearer wherever he wishes to go. Fortunatus returns to Cyprus, but his life of luxury is cut short by Fortune, and his two sons inherit the purse and hat; they agree that Andelocia will take the purse and Ampedo the hat. Andelocia goes to England and woos Agripyne, the daughter of king Athelstane, but she tricks him out of his purse. He returns to Cyprus and robs Ampedo of his hat, then travels to England in disguise hoping to regain his purse. Though he succeeds in abducting Agripyne, she takes the hat and uses it to return home. Not only has Andelocia now lost both purse and hat, he has also been turned into a horned beast by injudiciously eating apples from the tree planted by Vice. Virtue offers to turn him back to his old shape if he will only eat her fruit, bitter though it tastes. He does so, and is transformed both physically and morally. On Fortune's advice he travels to England, in disguise again, in the hope of regaining the purse and hat. There he finds not only Agripyne but also Ampedo. He takes both talismans from the princess and gives the hat to Ampedo, who, recognizing the ill-luck it has brought them, burns it. The brothers are now taken prisoner by English courtiers and, unable to use the hat to escape, are put in the stocks and die there. Fortune takes back the marvellous purse, and appeal is made from the stage to Queen Elizabeth to decide whether Virtue or Vice has been the victor.

== Writing and publication ==
Old Fortunatus is based on the old German tale of Fortunatus, first published as a chapbook at Augsburg in 1509, and again in a slightly different form at Frankfurt am Main in 1550. The story was dramatized by Hans Sachs in 1553. An English play referred to as The First Part of Fortunatus is known to have been written in 1596, but the text of it has not survived, and its relationship to Dekker's play has been the subject of much conjecture. Dekker's Old Fortunatus was written in November 1599 for the theatrical impresario Philip Henslowe and his company, the Admiral's Men. The text as we now have it is a revision made shortly afterwards for a performance before Queen Elizabeth on 27 December 1599. It was published in quarto early in 1600, implying that it was no longer being produced on the public stage.

== Revival and critical reception ==
When Charles Lamb drew the public's attention to the best Elizabethan and Jacobean plays in his Specimens of English Dramatic Poets Who Lived about the Time of Shakespeare (1808) he included substantial extracts from Old Fortunatus, and declared that the man who wrote it "had poetry enough for any thing." The first edition of the play for more than 200 years appeared in 1814, as part of C. W. Dilke's Old English Plays. Old Fortunatus was acted at Covent Garden on eleven nights in 1819, with incidental music by Henry Bishop. The same year William Hazlitt delivered his Lectures on the Dramatic Literature of the Age of Elizabeth, in which he spoke of Old Fortunatus as having "the idle garrulity of age, with the freshness and gaiety of youth still upon its cheek and in its heart." Later in the century James Russell Lowell called the play "a favourite of mine", while George Saintsbury wrote that it was "to the last degree crude and undigested, but the ill-matured power of the writer is almost the more apparent." The literary historian Adolphus William Ward balanced the work's vices and virtues:

The construction of this drama is necessarily lax; the wild defiance of the unities of time and place accords well with the nature of the subject; but as the author seems so strongly impressed by the moral of his story, he ought not to have allowed the virtuous and the vicious son of Fortunatus to come alike to grief...Altogether this romantic comedy attracts by a singular vigour and freshness; but its principal charm lies in the appropriately naif treatment of its simple, not to say childlike, theme.

== Modern editions ==
- Ernest Rhys (ed.) Thomas Dekker London: Vizetelly & Co., 1887. Repr. London: T. Fisher Unwin, 1888, and again 1904. Repr. London: Ernest Benn, 1949.
- Hans Scherer (ed.) The Pleasant Comedie of Old Fortunatus Erlangen: A. Deichert, 1901.
- Oliphant Smeaton (ed.) Old Fortunatus: A Play London: J. M. Dent, 1904.
- Fredson Bowers (ed.) The Dramatic Works of Thomas Dekker, vol. 1, Cambridge: Cambridge University Press, 1953.
- Old Fortunatus: 1600 Menston: Scolar Press, 1971. Facsimile reprint of the 1600 edition.
