= Aragonese literature =

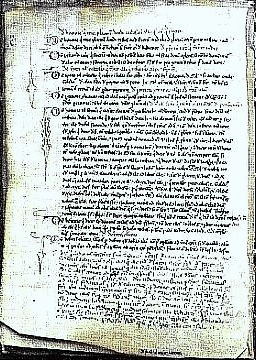
A page from Liber Regum

Aragonese literature (Aragonese: Literatura en aragonés) of Spain includes Aragonese-language poetry, prose and novels.

== Middle Ages ==
The Glosas Emilianenses (11th century) are the first written testimony in Basque and Aragonese languages. This is known from their finding but it is said that they are written in Spanish. This text has a lot of Aragonese-language features like the article o, a; the diphthongization of duenno, nuestro, sieculo, get (ye) and vocabulary such as honore and aiutorio.

From the 11th century all Aragonese documents were written in Latin with Romance features, but it is not until the second part of the 13th century that there is generalization of the use of Aragonese language in all documents, a later date than in Castile or Occitania. From this century there are a lot of works written in Aragonese mixed with Spanish such as Razón feita d'amor, Lo Libre dels Tres Reys d'Orient or Bida de Santa María Egipciaca. There are still some Aragonese epics texts such as Cantar d'a Campana de Uesca. Prose works show better Medieval Aragonese: os Diez Mandamientos, Romance versions of Fueros d'Aragón; the first examples of history texts in Aragonese such as the Liber Regum.

In the 14th century, Johan Ferrández d'Heredia, Grand Master of the Knights Hospitaller, translated some works into Aragonese in Avignon. He made this a language of culture. Other people like Johan de Balbastro or Johan de Tudela also made translations into Aragonese. For example, they translated Zeremonial de Consagrazión y Coronazión d'os reis d'Aragón, a Cronica de San Chuan d'a Peña, o Libro del Trasoro, o Libro de Marabiellas d'o Mundo and other works. The second half of the 14th century was the Golden Age of Medieval Aragonese.

Since Fernando I of Trastamara Spanish replaced Aragonese as cultural language in Aragon as a castilianization process that ends in the 15th century. After that there are no texts left: only an Eximén Aznariz's poem, a book of refrains called Romancea Porverbiorum and a few poems in some Aragonese protocols.

From the 15th century there developed a special singularity in this language's literature: Aljamiado in which Aragonese features could stand Spanish influence until their disappearance in 1610. Poema de Yuçuf (Poem of Joseph)

== Modern era ==
Since 1500, Spanish has been the language of culture in Aragon: many Aragonese have highlights writing in that language, and in the 17th century the Argensola brothers said they were going to Castile in order to teach them Castilian.

Aragonese language, converted in a rural language, and cornered in the Pyrenees, adopted a popular character. The 16th century was a dark century: we only have Aljamiado. In the 17th century there appeared some writers that used this language to characterize popular characters: for example, Ana Abarca de Bolea (Casbas' Abbess) used Semontano Aragonese in some poems. In a literary competition held at Huesca in 1650, Matías Pradas, Isabel de Rosas and "Fileno, montañés" participated with works written in Aragonese. From the 17th and 18th century there are "pastoradas" where the repatán will talk in Aragonese.

The theme of the poetry of Ana Francisca Abarca de Bolea is mostly sacred and popular character. In one of them uses the Aragonese language, one of the rare examples of literature Aragonese linguistic features of the seventeenth century. One example is the "birth Albada" consisting of twenty couplets arromanzadas and Christmas themed, folklore and customs betrays ("sung by Pascual Ginés and the use of their village and are of the bagpipe '). The comment of the author, "the letter gave flare and admired the inventiveness and therefore be retained that ancient language used in Spain", indicating that it was not aware of the use of the Aragonese language. These poems were studied by philologists Manuel Alvar, Francho Nagore, M ª José Manuel Angeles Field or Blecua. Here's an example of his "birth Albada":

The 19th and 20th centuries see the rebirth of Aragonese literature, but its condition of minority language and without a standard reference will leave writers to write about their own topics, mainly parochial, in their own Aragonese dialectal variety. Thus, in 1844 appeared in Almudébar Aragonese the novel Vida de Pedro Saputo, written by Braulio Foz. The 20th century features: in Cheso Aragonese, Domingo Miral's comedies of manners and Veremundo Méndez poetry; in Ribagorçan Graus dialect, the popular writings of Tonón de Baldomera and the verses of Cleto Torrodellas; in Semontano Aragonese, Pedro Arnal Cavero's comedies of manners and the popular Juana Coscujuela novel, A Lueca, istoria d'una mozeta d'o Semontano.

After Franco's dictatorship, Aragonese literature was revitalized and now follows the standard model. In 1977, Francho Nagore Laín wrote the first grammar of the Aragonese Language. In 1972 Ánchel Conte published the poetry collection called "No deixez morir a mía boz". Eduardo Vicente de Vera published "Garba y augua" (1976) and "Do s'amorta l'alba", 1977. Years later the number of authors in Aragonese standard language grew (Francho Rodés, Chusé Inazio Nabarro, Miguel Santolaria, Fernando Romanos, Chusé Raul Usón, Carlos Diest, Josep Carles Laínez, Óscar Latas, Roberto Cortés Alonso, Ana Giménez, Carmina Paraíso Santolaria,...) as well as other authors in various local Aragonese dialects (Nieus Luzía Dueso or Quino Villa in Chistau dialect; Rosario Ustáriz, Mariví Nicolás, Emilio Gastón or Pepe Lera in Cheso Aragonese, Ricardo Mur, Chusé María Satué and Maximo Palacio Alto Galligo Aragonese, Chuana Coscujuela in Semontano Aragonese or Chusé María Ferrer, Ana Tena, Toni Collada, Pablo Recio, Elena Chazal u Carmen Castán's works in Ribagorçan Graus dialect. In addition, competitions that promote literary creativity in the Aragonese language have come to fruition including events such as the Premio Literario Billa de Sietemo and Premio de Relatos "Luis del Val".

== Bibliography ==
- EITO MATEO, Antón, "Breve acercamiento a la poesía aragonesa contemporánea", in Ianua, 1 (ISSN 1616-413X).
- VV. AA., El aragonés: identidad y problemática de una lengua, 1982, Zaragoza ISBN 84-7078-022-0
- Chusé Antón Santamaría Loriente: La literatura infantil en aragonés, Rolde · Revista de Cultura Aragonesa, nº 132, enero-marzo de 2010, pp. 28–37.
