= Little Muck =

1826 fairy tale by Wilhelm Hauff

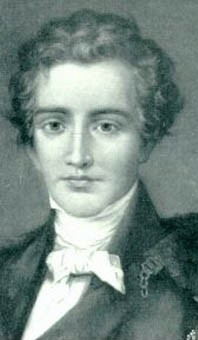
Wilhelm Hauff

The story of Little Muck (German: Die Geschichte von dem kleinen Muck) is a fairy tale written by Wilhelm Hauff. It was published in 1826 in a collection of fairy tales and tells the story of an outsider called Little Muck.

== Frame story ==
The fairy tale is embedded in a frame story called "The Caravan": the participants of a caravan tell each other stories, as they do not want to get bored. One of the participants is a young merchant called Muley. He tells the story of Little Muck.

== Plot ==
As a child, Muley knew a little person called Little Muck, who also lived in his home town Nicea in Turkey. Little Muck lived alone in a house, which he rarely left. Due to his misshapen figure and his unsuitable clothing Muley and his friends always made fun of him. One day, they were extremely mean to him. Thereupon Muley's father gave him 50 blows with a pipe stem. After the first 25 blows he told him the following story:

Muck's father Mukrah was a well-respected, but poor man, who lived as lonely as his son. He was ashamed of Muck's misshapen figure and therefore he did not allow him any kind of education. When Mukrah died, his relatives inherited everything, as he owed them a lot of money. Muck only got a suit with wide trousers, a wide belt, a coat, a turban and a knife.

His father was tall and thus Little Muck cut off the legs and sleeves of the wide trousers without changing the width. Afterwards he left his home town to seek his fortune. Shortly afterwards Muck found an accommodation and a new job in another town: he had to take care of the cats and dogs of a mysterious woman called Miss Ahavzi.

One day Muck entered a forbidden room in Miss Ahavzi's house and accidentally destroyed an expensive bowl. He took two items of this room and decided to flee, as he did not get his wages and was often punished for no reason. These two items had, as it turned out, magical powers: With the pair of slippers, he could not only walk faster than any other person, but also fly to any place he wanted. And the walking stick showed him buried treasures.

The king was impressed by Muck's magic slippers, and thus offered him a position as a courier, which made the other servants jealous of him. With the help of his magic walking stick, Muck discovered a forgotten treasure in the palace garden one day. As he wanted to make new friends, he distributed all the gold he had found to other people. However, he was charged with theft and sent to prison.

At that time the official punishment for stealing royal property was death. However, Little Muck could save his life by telling the king more about the magic power of the slippers and the walking stick. Thereupon the king tried on the slippers, but as Muck did not show the king how to stop the slippers, the latter ran and ran until he passed out. He was very angry, confiscated the magic items and chased Muck away. After an eight-hour march, Little Muck finally reached the border of a small country.

By chance, he discovered two fig trees in a forest. With the help of the figs he could retaliate: the first variety of figs caused the growth of huge donkey ears and a long nose; by eating the second variety of figs, it went back to normal. Dressed up as a salesman Little Muck smuggled the first variety of figs on the king's table. Shortly afterwards he dressed up as a scholar and offered the king the second variety of figs as a remedy for his and his royal court's deformities.

After proving the effectiveness of his cure, the King led Muck into the treasury, where he should choose a reward. He immediately snatched his magic items and revealed his identity. With the help of his magic slippers Little Muck flew back home and left the disloyal king with his deformed face behind. Since then, he lived in his home town in great prosperity, but lonely as he despised other people.

"Muck became wise through experience and therefore he deserves admiration instead of mockery", Muley's father ended his narrative and spared his son the remaining half of the blows. Muley told Muck's story to his friends, who were very impressed by the story of Muck's life. From this day forth they honored Muck and bowed before him whenever they saw him.

== Publication ==
The tale was originally written in German. The story was further translated into English and published as part of Arabian Days' Entertainments (an obvious nod to The Arabian Nights). The story was also included in many compilations of Wilhelm Hauff's tales, sometimes with an oriental flavor.

== Interpretation ==
The father tries to explain to his son that it is superficial to judge people only by their looks. Little Muck is still a respected man, even with his grotesque appearance. Nevertheless, he remains an outsider, which marks a great difference to other fairy tale figures with magic items. Even though the fairy tale takes place in the Orient, the ruling system described here is to be understood as criticism of the countries of the German Confederation: due to its small size, Little Muck is able to leave the country on foot within eight hours, he does not even have to make use of his magic slippers. Similar to the Duke in "Dwarf Nose", the King is an incompetent ruler: after being tricked by his courtiers he seizes the magical items and expels Little Muck from the country. The latter consequently takes revenge by using the figs. Due to the hierarchy, the King eats most of them, and is thus punished even harder, because Little Muck refuses to give him the curing variety of figs. Based on this tale, Muley and his comrades become better people. Thus the fairy tale is a parable about the desired impact of literature.

The theft of magical items by the tale's antagonist and their recovery by means of a strange fruit the causes a shapeshifting effect on those who eat them is very similar to the Fortunatus cycle and the Aarne–Thompson–Uther tale type ATU 566, "The Three Magic Objects and the Wonderful Fruits".

== German film adaptions (selection) ==
- 1944: Der kleine Muck (director: Franz Fiedler; black-and-white; set in 18th century Holy Roman Empire)
- 1953: Die Geschichte vom kleinen Muck (director: Wolfgang Staudte)

== Other film adaptations ==
- 1921: Little Muck (directed by William Prager)
- 1938: Little Muck (directed by Olga Khodataeva, cartoon, USSR)
- 1971: Little Muck (directed by Otto Anton Eder, telefilm, Austria)
- 1975: Muck the Messenger (directed by Nathan Lerner, cartoon, USSR)
- 1983: The Adventures of Little Muck (directed by Elizaveta Kimyagarova, television film, USSR, Tajikfilm)
