= The Knapsack, the Hat, and the Horn =

German fairy tale

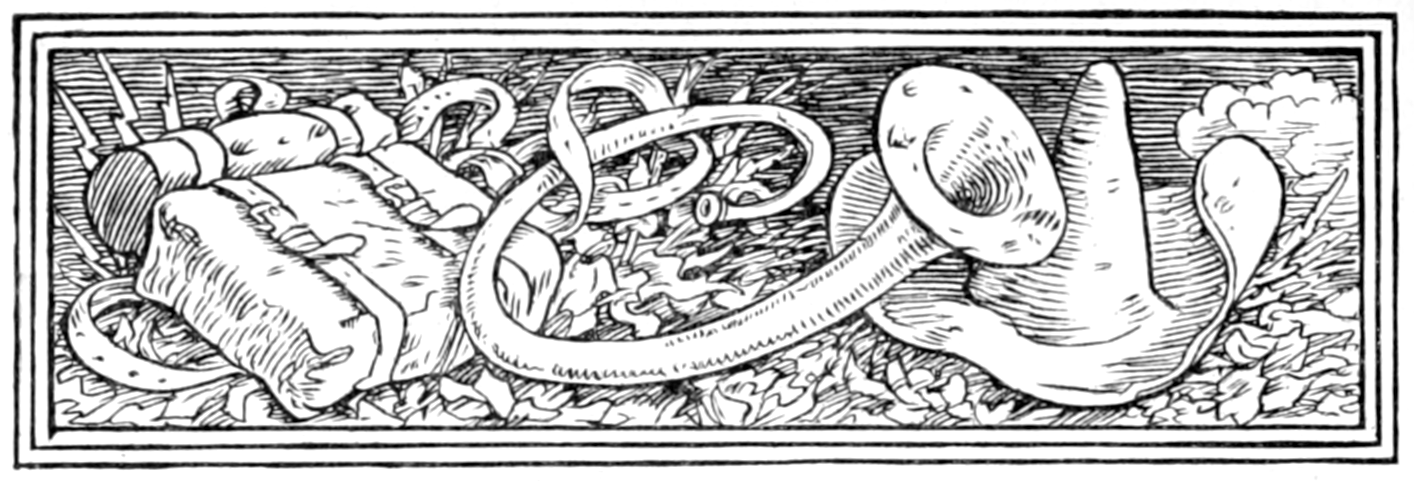
- Illustration to tale by Walter Crane

Folk tale
- Name: The Knapsack, the Hat, and the Horn
- Aarne–Thompson grouping: ATU 569
- Country: Germany
- Published in: Grimms' Fairy Tales

"The Knapsack, the Hat, and the Horn" (German: Der Ranzen, das Hütlein und das Hörnlein) is a German fairy tale by the Brothers Grimm and is numbered KHM 54. It is Aarne–Thompson type 569.

== Synopsis ==
Three brothers set out to seek their fortunes. The first finds silver, the second finds gold, and the third acquires a variety of magical objects. These objects include a knapsack that summons soldiers, a hat that fires bullets, and a horn that can destroy cities. By the use of these items, he marries a princess and becomes the ruler of a nation.

This fairy tale has also been given the alternate title "The Fortune Seekers".
