= Dwarf Nose =

1826 literary fairy tale by Wilhelm Hauff

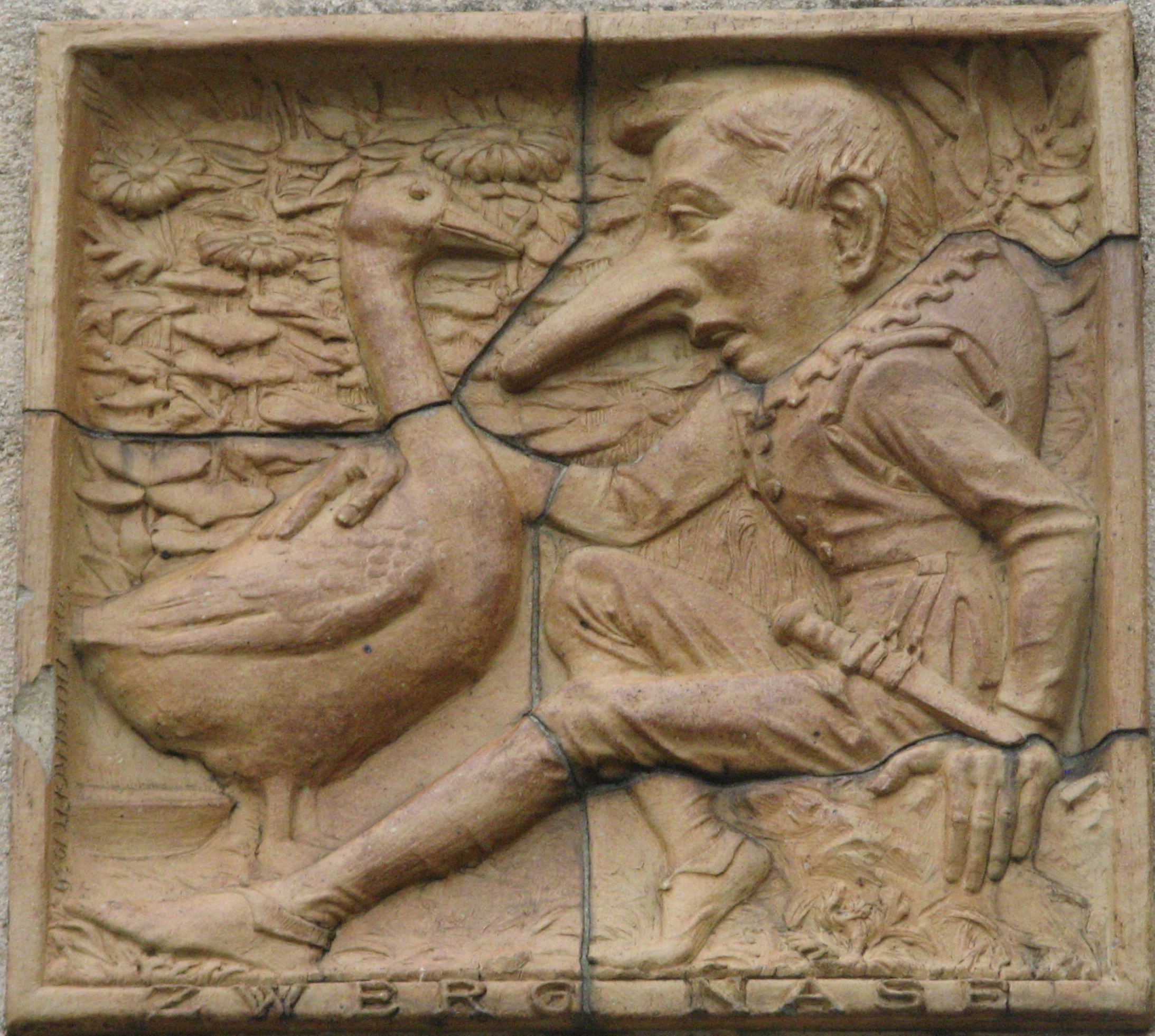
The transformed Jacob with the goose Mimi as depicted on a 1939 terracotta relief in Vienna

Dwarf Nose is a fairy tale by Wilhelm Hauff, which was published in a collection of fairytales in 1826. The story has been adopted by Andrew Lang in the Violet Fairy Book.

== Summary ==
The tale is about Jacob, the son of a cobbler, who lives in a small German town. When he was twelve years old, he is said to have had a beautiful face and figure. His mother, Hanne, sells vegetables and fruit at the market and Jacob helps her by carrying home the bags for the customers.

One day, an ugly old woman, who has a long, crooked nose and a thin neck, comes to his mother's stand to buy some herbs. It is later revealed that she is the fairy Wise-herb. She throws everything into disarray and makes a mess of the herbs on display so that nobody wants to buy them anymore. In reaction to this, Jacob insults her and makes fun of her looks. In response, she wishes him a long nose as well, and no neck. In the end, she does buy a few cabbages and lets Jacob carry them home for her.

Arriving at the house of the woman, the cabbages turn into human heads. Guinea pigs and squirrels, which behave like humans and serve the old woman, are living here. She offers Jacob some soup while she is talking about a herb that he will never find. After he eats the soup, Jacob feels like he is falling asleep and is dreaming about living and working as a squirrel in the woman's house. He stays for seven years and learns, among other things, how to cook. By doing that he discovers a herb, smells it and wakes up.

However, when he returns to his family, nobody recognizes him and everyone, including his own mother and father, call him a hideous dwarf and chase him away. He has turned into an actual dwarf with a long nose, no neck, a hump and brown hands.

After this rejection, Jacob decides to try his luck as a cook and visits the duke (Herzog) of “Frankistan”, who is known as a gourmet (the backstory plays in the Orient, where a German tells this fairy tale from his homeland, the country of the Franks). There he manages to convince the chef of his talent and the duke, who loves his cooking as well, employs him as the sous chef and gives him the name Dwarf Nose. Jacob is now highly respected.

After two years, Jacob buys three geese at the market and one of them talks to him. The goose tells him that her name is Mimi and that she was the daughter of the wizard Weatherbuck from the island of Gotland. She, too, had been cursed by a wicked sorceress, she explained. To be sure, she continued, she knew a lot about magic herbs and tells Jacob that he has to find the herb which transformed him in order to be liberated.

Because the duke is being visited by another nobleman, Jacob is supposed to prepare an extravagant meal for them. The nobleman enjoys his meal but then orders the queen of all pâtés, a Souzeraine, which Jacob does not know how to make but fortunately Mimi does. With her help he bakes the pâté, but the earl thinks it lacks the herb "sneeze-with-pleasure". Jacob has to go and find it to bake another one, otherwise he will be beheaded. Mimi once again helps him out by looking for the herb with him. Once he finds and smells it, he transforms back into his old self.

In order to show his gratitude, he takes Mimi back to her father who lifts her curse as well.

Everything turns out well for Mimi and him, but the duke and his guest declare war (herbal war) on each other because of Jacob's curse, which can only be ended by a perfectly baked pâté (pâté peace).

== Interpretation ==
In his works, Wilhelm Hauff often comments on the political situation of his time. In the pre-March era, Germany was torn into several different small countries, which were governed by their arbitrary king, duke or earl. Hauff dreamt of witnessing these injustices being persecuted. He also believed that a righteous and strong king could provide the people with fortune and wealth.

In Dwarf Nose his criticism also becomes obvious through the names of the dishes, which the bewitched boy has to prepare for his nobleman: the Danish soup, red hamburger dumplings and – upon a special request of the earl – “the queen of all dishes, the pâté Souzeraine”, a clear allusion to the political expression suzerainty. It is consequently no accident, that Hauff ends his story with a “pâté peace”.

The art of cooking becomes Jacob's purpose in life, which thereby compensates for the rejection from his family. It is typical for a family tale by Hauff that Jacob marries no utopian princess, but Mimi, an ordinary woman (daughter of the wizard).
