= Ana Francisca Abarca de Bolea =

Spanish writer and poet

Ana Francisca Abarca de Bolea (1602–1685) was a Spanish writer and poet born in Zaragoza on 19 April 1602 and died in Casbas (Huesca) around 1685.

== Career ==
Born into a family of noble lineage, Bolea (one of whose descendants would become the Count of Aranda), was the daughter of Martin Abarca de Bolea y Castro, a humanist, and Ana de Mur. After being baptized in the Zaragozan Parish of San Felipe, she lived from three years of age in the Real Monastery of Santa Maria de la villa in Casbas, from which she was unable to leave and where she developed a deep religious and humanistic background.

Within the enclosures of the monastery Bolea was enriched with many different readings to the point where she was able to learn classical Latin. She was professed as religious on 4 June 1624. In 1655 she was mistress of novices and came to hold the office of abbess in 1672. She corresponded with leading scholars and writers within the Aragonese literary circles, she particularly enjoyed the patronage of Vincencio Juan de Lastanosa, as well as the Count of Salinas, Juan Francisco Andrés de Uztarroz and most likely, with Gracián, who praised her and collected her poems in his Agudeza y arte de ingenio.

Ana Francisca Abarca de Bolea's poetry is found within a miscellaneous book titled Vigilia y Octaverio de San Juan Bautista (Zaragoza, 1679), which also combines a short novel, or apologue (La ventura en la desdicha), and a novel (El fin bueno en mal principio). It deals with the miscellaneous genre—very well known at the time—where in the framework of a dialogue inherited from humanism, literature of various genres are interspersed. In this case, the framework resembles that of a pastoral novel, perhaps the last Spanish pastoral novel of the time, in which a group of rich and refined pastors meet in an area of Moncayo, where a hermitage dedicated to San Juan stands to celebrate the vigil and Octave of the feast of the Saint. Over a period of nine days, they amuse themselves with various entertainments and banquets, engaging in debates, the telling of anecdotes, and reciting romances and songs.

The themes of her poetry in large part possess a sacred and popular character. In some of them she uses the Aragonese language—in fact, her works are some of the few examples of literature with linguistic features of seventeenth-century Aragonese. An example is the "birth Albada" which is composed of twenty Christmas-themed romantic couplets and reveals folklore customs (sung by Ginés and Pascual to the custom of their village and sound of the bagpipes). The author's commentary--"the lyrics gave remarkable pleasure and they admired the ingenuity, and may that ancient tongue that was used in Spain be conserved"—indicates that the use of the Aragonese language was not conscious. These poems were studied by Philologists Manuel Alvar, Francho Nagore, M.ª Ángeles Campo, or José Manuel Blecua. Here is an example of her "Albada de nacimiento" ("birth Albada"):

Media noche era por filos

las doce daba el reloch

cuando ha nagido en Belén

un mozardet como un sol.^{2}

== Works ==
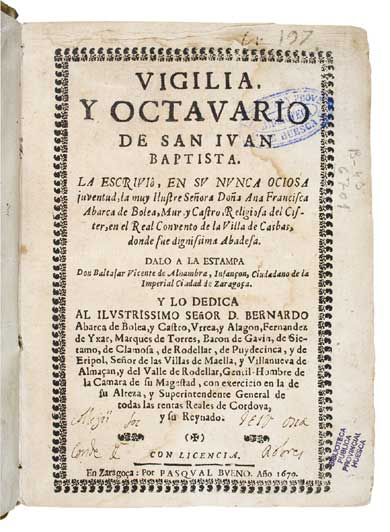
Ana Francisca Abarca de Bolea

- Obra en aragonés de Ana Francisca Abarca de Bolea ((in English): Ana Francisca Abarca de Bolea's work in Aragonese), in Publicazións d´o Consello d´a Fabla Aragonesa, Huesca, 1980.
- Catorce vidas de Santas de la Orden del Císter ((in English): Fourteen Holy lives within the Cistercian Order), Zaragoza, Herederos de Pedro Lanaja y Lamarca, 1655.
- Historia del aparecimiento y milagros de Nuestra Señora de Gloria, venerada en el Real Monasterio Cisterciense de Casbas ((in English): History of the appearance and miracles of Our Lady of Glory, venerated in the Royal Cistercian Monastery of Casbas) (manuscript).
- Vida de la Gloriosa Santa Susana, Virgen y Mártir, Princesa de Hungría y Patrona de la villa de Maella, en el Reino de Aragón, lugar del Marqués de Torres, Zaragoza, Herederos de Pedro Lanaja y Lamarca ((in English): Life of the Glorious Santa Susana, Virgin and Martyr, Princess of Hungary, Patroness of the town of Maella, in the Kingdom of Aragon, in the Marquis de Torres, Zaragoza, Heirs of Pedro Lanaja y Lamarca), 1671.
- Vida de San Félix Cantalicio ((in English): Life of St Felix Cantalicio) (manuscript).
- Vigilia y Octavario de San Juan Bautista, Zaragoza, Pascual Bueno ((in English): Vigil and Octavario of St. John the Baptist, Zaragoza, Pascual Bueno), 1679.
