= Moonzy: The Other Side of the Moon =

- Theatrical release poster
- Directed by: Darina Shmidt
- Written by: Darina Shmidt
- Produced by: Alexander Boyarskiy; Sergey Selyanov; Anton Zlatopolskiy
- Starring: Anna Slynko; Yuliya Zorkina; Oleg Kulikovich; Maksim Sergeev; Mariya Tsvetkova; Valerii Smekalov; Yuliya Rudina; Anatoliy Petrov
- Edited by: Sergei Glezin
- Music by: Maksim Koshevarov; Aleksandr Maev
- Production companies: Melnitsa Animation Studio; CTB Film Company
- Distributed by: Volga
- Release date: 27 August 2026
- Running time: 74 minutes
- Country: Russia
- Language: Russian
- Box office: $3.2 million

Moonzy: The Other Side of the Moon (Russian: Лунтик. Обратная сторона Луны, romanized: Luntik. Obratnaya storona Luny, lit. 'Luntik. The Far Side of the Moon') is a 2026 Russian animated adventure film directed and written by Darina Shmidt. A direct sequel to Moonzy: Homecoming, the film follows Moonzy and her friends who build a rocket to the moon, to find Moonzy's lost father, going in adventures along the way.

The film was released in Russia on 27 August 2026.

== Plot ==
Following their previous adventure to the moon, that night, Moonzy sees an drawing of his mother. Later, he has an nightmare of, during the meteorite collision at his moon home, (Note: As depicted in Moonzy: Homecoming (2024)) multiple moon bees, including Moonzy's father, were lost trying to rescue other moon bee children, while her mother desperately called for her child. Moonzy convinces his friend, Flip, about his father, and decide that they need to find and rescue him.

When Moonzy is unable to return to the moon when his mark on his tummy fails to glow, he and his grandparents, Annie and Stringer, visit the moth at his laboratory, who agrees to let Moonzy go to the moon. With the moth's help, the group, along with Flip and his other friends, the spider Mr. Webber, the earthworm named Mr. Diggins, twin caterpillars Woopie and Poopsie, Weebee the bee, and the ladybug Dottie build a rocket to go the moon. Only Moonzy, Flip, Woopsie and Poopsie launch the rocket, and, after braving a meteor shower, eventually reach the moon, and find a utopia filled with moon bees. There, Moonzy reconciles with his depressed mother, who explains that if he worries less, his mark on his tummy can glow again.

Returning to the surface, the group accidentally damage their rocket ship. When they go out to investigate, the group fall into a cave, the far side of the moon. While there, they encounter rolling ball-like creatures named the molesters. After evading them, Moonzy reconciles with his father, but initially claims not to be his father, but rather his uncle named Monty, also known as Grol, and says that his real father fell into the gorge. The group then decides to abandon Grol, but get attacked by more molesters. Grol arrives and rescues them, who reveals that the creatures can be driven away by a light source.

During their journey back to the surface, the group are separated, forcing them to go their separate ways. After more adventures and Moonzy leaning more things, Grol reveals to him that his friends were captured by the molesters, Grol spared. Grol then reveals his original identity to Moonzy. After subduing and riding a flying creature, the group reconciles with Flip, Woopsie and Poopsie. Grol is suddenly captured by more molesters, who take them to an lair where their molester leader lives and holds his friends captive. Moonzy and his friends arrive and rescue the captives, including Grol, and they finally return to the surface. Grol sacrifices himself to bring the others to safety, but Moonzy saves the latter as his mark glows, bringing him back to the surface. "Grol" reveals that he is actually his father, much to Moonzy's excitement.

The group is ambushed by the molester leader again, but Moonzy and his parents, combining their powers, manage to de-integrate it. Afterwards, the group repair the rocket ship and her friends return to the moon as the other moon bees reconcile with their children. In an epilogue, Moonzy's friends visit him from the Earth and back more often as they learn new things.

== Cast ==
- Anna Slynko as:
  - Moonzy, a purple lunar bee
    - Slynko also voices a bee and a butterfly
- Mariya Tsvetkova as Moonzy's mother and Elina, a butterfly
  - Tsvetkova also voices a teacher
- Maksim Sergeev as Moonzy's father
- Yuliya Zorkina as Flip, the grasshopper and Granny Annie
- Oleg Kulikovich as Woopsie and Poopsie, twin caterpillars
- Yuliya Rudina as Sweetheart, a mother moon bee, and a butterfly
- Anatoliy Petrov as General Stringer, Mr. Webber the Spider, and Mr. Diggins
- Valerii Smekalov as the old moth scientist
- Mikhail Chernyak as the narrator

== Production ==
A direct sequel to Moonzy: Homecoming was announced on September 2025 at an in-person defense of the animated national projects of the Cinema Fund. During the project's presentation, it was announced that the main location of the film would take place on the Moon, where Moonzy and his friends would go. According to producer Sergey Selyanov, the new story would be related to the search for Moonzy's father and would continue the storyline from the first film. It was also reported that the characters would use a constructed vehicle or a rocket, and that the film would feature elements of the lunar world that were not previously shown in the series.

== Release ==
The film was released theatrically in Russia on 27 August 2026.
