= Rejected =

2000 film by Don Hertzfeldt

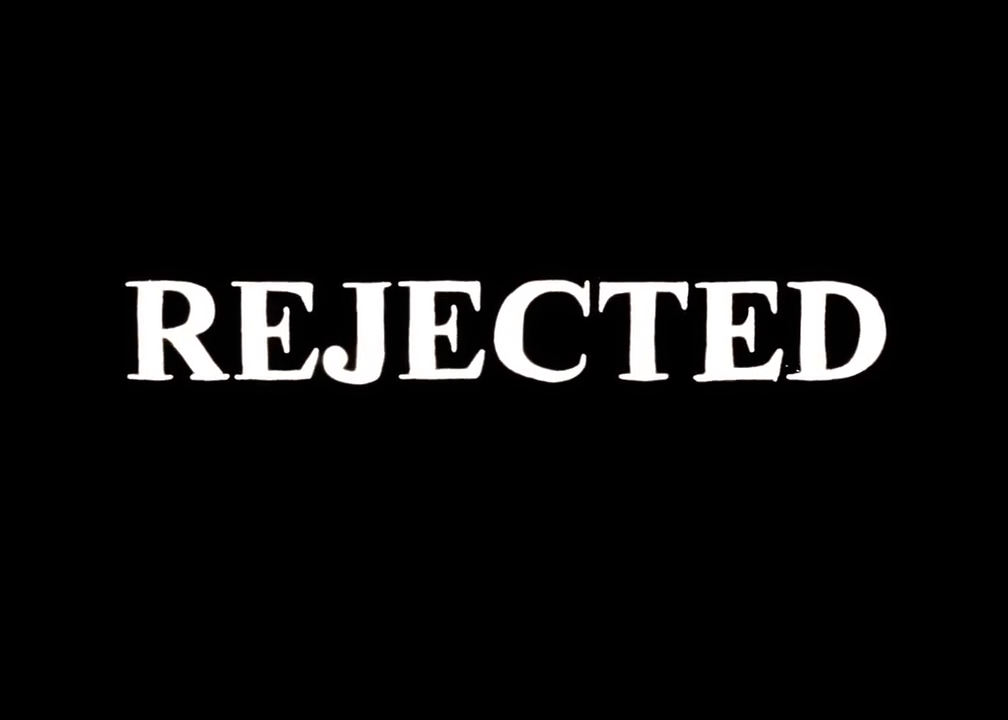
- The film's title card
- Directed by: Don Hertzfeldt
- Written by: Don Hertzfeldt
- Produced by: Don Hertzfeldt
- Starring: Robert May; Jennifer Nyholm; Don Hertzfeldt
- Cinematography: Don Hertzfeldt
- Edited by: Rebecca Moline
- Production company: Bitter Films
- Release date: 25 July 2000
- Running time: 9 minutes
- Country: United States
- Language: English

Rejected is an animated surrealist short comedy film directed by Don Hertzfeldt that was released in 2000. It was nominated for an Academy Award for Best Animated Short Film the following year at the 73rd Academy Awards, and received 27 awards from film festivals around the world.

== Plot ==
Rejected makes heavy use of surreal humor, such as in this scene that uses a giant spoon and an anthropomorphic banana to advertise the Family Learning Channel.

The film's fictional narrative is presented as a series of promotional cartoons created by Don Hertzfeldt, commissioned by the Family Learning Channel in spring 1999. Text title cards serve as a production diary, chronicling Hertzfeldt's psychological decline as his work is repeatedly rejected. The early segments begin as mildly absurd advertisements that quickly become chaotic and illogical.

Following his rejection by the Family Learning Channel, Hertzfeldt receives commissions from the corporation Johnson & Mills, which also rejects his work. The commercials grow progressively darker, more violent, and surreal. Hertzfeldt becomes increasingly erratic, eventually completing his commissions using only his left hand, resulting in crude and unstable animation.

Ultimately, the framing device collapses completely. Through stop-motion animation, the physical paper on which the cartoons are drawn begins to tear and crumple. The characters flee in terror as the page is consumed by a growing void. A final character silently screams as he is swallowed by the void, destroying the world of the film entirely.

== Production ==
While attending the University of California, Santa Barbara, where he earned a Bachelor of Arts in film studies, Don Hertzfeldt released four student films—one per year—between 1995 and 1998, graduating at the end of 1998. These short films, Ah, L'Amour (1995), Genre (1996), Lily and Jim (1997), and Billy's Balloon (1998), grew increasingly successful on the film festival circuit, with Billy's Balloon competing for the Short Film Palme d'Or at the 1999 Cannes Film Festival. The success of Billy's Balloon led Hertzfeldt to receive numerous offers to direct television commercials, all of which he declined. Hertzfeldt had previously shot his short films on a 16mm film camera owned by the university; the revenue generated from selling his student films to MTV and European television allowed him to purchase studio space, as well as a 1940s-era 35mm Richardson rostrum camera stand, which had previously been used to animate several Peanuts television specials.

from the production diary, january 2000: "as a rule, the first time you see your rough cut you're unequivocally depressed and horrified because it's the absolute worst state the film will ever be in... yet it's oddly exciting at the same time because now you get to do everything you can think of to save the damn thing..."

— Don Hertzfeldt, c. 2005

Working alone in his studio, Hertzfeldt began production on Rejected in 1999 as a satirical response to commercial animation and the advertising industry. The short film was conceived as a collection of television commercials which had supposedly been commissioned—and subsequently rejected—by fictional corporate clients, including the "Family Learning Channel" and "Johnson & Mills". He drew and photographed the film entirely by himself, laboring with paper and pens on a 35mm rostrum camera using traditional animation techniques and with no computers involved. The short film's animation took several months to complete, during which Hertzfeldt found himself becoming tired of his own jokes after only a couple of weeks of work. During the climax's collapse, Hertzfeldt created the crumpling paper effects through stop-motion animation on the same sheets of paper on which the characters were drawn.

Recording dialogue after the animation was completed resulted in visible lip syncing errors.

In an unusual departure from standard animation practices, Hertzfeldt and Robert May recorded their voice lines after the animation had already been completed, which led them to improvise dialogue over scenes. Hertzfeldt later remarked that he voiced the characters May did not want to perform, and that much of the dialogue was improvised or changed at the last minute. Sound production was handled by Tim Kehl; post-production sound mixing took approximately 100 hours to complete. Hertzfeldt often cut and rewrote segments of the film during the final sound mixes, as he felt it was necessary to "let the thing shape itself." For the short film's soundtrack, Hertzfeldt utilized public domain recordings of the first two movements of Beethoven's Symphony No. 9, the traditional Swedish Christmas song "Nu är det jul igen", and royalty-free muzak.

== Release ==
=== Exhibition history ===
Rejected world-premiered at the San Diego Comic Convention in 2000. Between hundreds of film festival appearances, Rejected also toured North American theaters in 2000, 2001, and 2002 with Spike and Mike's Festival of Animation; in 2001 and 2002 again with a retrospective touring program of Hertzfeldt's and animator Bill Plympton's films called "The Don and Bill Show"; and returned to theaters once again in 2003 and 2004 with Hertzfeldt's own the Animation Show tour.

Released nationwide in theaters through the Spike and Mike's Festival of Animation in 2000, the short won 27 film festival awards and was nominated for an Oscar for Best Animated Short Film the following year.

In the early 2000s, pirated copies of Rejected turned the film into a viral sensation online, where it has been credited with shaping the surreal sense of humor of the early Internet.

In 2003, two of the "Fluffy Guy" characters reappeared in three Hertzfeldt cartoons created to introduce and bookend the first year of the Animation Show: Welcome to the Show, Intermission in the Third Dimension, and the End of the Show. The two characters appeared again in 2025, in a new pair of bookend cartoons, to introduce the Hertzfeldt-curated theatrical program Animation Mixtape.

Rejected was scheduled to air on Adult Swim in 2001 but was delayed for unknown reasons—it was rescheduled to air on November 3, 2002 "uncut and commercial free", and was heavily promoted on the network that week. However, the short was pulled from the schedule at the last minute, for unknown reasons. Rumors about the reasons behind this highly unusual action have included: the film's brief use of the phrase "Sweet Jesus" ("Jesus" being a word allegedly not allowed on a Turner Network back then), and an anonymous high-ranking network executive simply not finding the short to be funny. Rejected has since aired without incident on the Cartoon Network in other countries as well as on other international television networks, but has to date never been broadcast on American television. However, a brief clip from the film has since aired on the Adult Swim anthology series Off the Air, 14 years later, in the episode "Holes". The scene mentioned in the episode is the scene with the "fluffy guys" in which one announces that his "anus is bleeding."

In 2020, for the film's twentieth anniversary, Hertzfeldt appeared at the Austin Film Society for a rare 35mm screening and discussed the making of the cartoon and its impact.

=== DVD, Blu-ray and streaming ===
In 2001 Bitter Films released a limited edition DVD "single" of the short film. The DVD "single" featured a deleted scene as well as an audio commentary, and is now out of print.

In 2006, Rejected was remastered and restored for inclusion on the DVD, "Bitter Films Volume 1", a compilation of Don Hertzfeldt's short films from 1995–2005. Special features on this DVD relating to Rejected included a new text commentary by Hertzfeldt (via closed-caption boxes), footage from the abandoned cartoon "The Spanky the Bear Show" that later evolved into a central scene in the film, original pencil tests, the 2001 audio commentary, and dozens of pages devoted to Hertzfeldt's original sketches, storyboards, notes, and deleted ideas from the film.

In 2015, the cartoon was remastered again, this time in high definition, for inclusion on the Blu-ray of It's Such a Beautiful Day.

A 35-second deleted scene from Rejected was only released on the 2001 DVD "single". In it, a father inquires into his son's desire to drink goat's blood. The scene appears to fit in with the "Johnson & Mills" portion of the original film and is revealed to be an advertisement for cotton swabs at the end.

On August 4, 2026, Rejected began streaming on the comedy streaming service Dropout, alongside a number of other films produced by Hertzfeldt.

== Legacy ==
Rejected is now considered a cult classic and one of the most influential animated films ever made.

In the early 2000s, pirated copies of Rejected turned the film into a viral video, where it has been credited with shaping the surreal sense of humor of the early Internet. In 2018 New York magazine wrote, "If there is a single piece of media that inspired what we nebulously refer to as 'Internet humor', it's probably Rejected", additionally citing it as "the cartoon that invented Internet culture".

In 2009, Rejected was the only short film named as one of the "Films of the Decade" by Salon. In 2010, it was noted as one of the five "most innovative animated films of the past ten years" by The Huffington Post. Indiewire film critic Eric Kohn named Rejected one of the "10 best films of the 21st century" on his list for the BBC Culture poll in 2016.

== In popular culture ==
- A fan of the film, quoting, "I am the Queen of France!" appeared on the Late Show with David Letterman.
- The alternate dimension scenes from the Aqua Teen Hunger Force episode "Broodwich" were an acknowledged homage to Don Hertzfeldt. Hertzfeldt's films, and Rejected in particular, were a strong early influence on Adult Swim writers and Aqua Teen creators Matt Maiellaro and Dave Willis.
- A 2013 episode of the Fine Brothers' web series YouTubers React featured Rejected.
- The introduction section of the 2006 video game Prey features a crude scrawling in the room's bathroom that is a direct reference to the first sketch; "My spoon is too big."
- Musician Neil Cicierega's album Hip to the Javabean features a song titled "Consumer Whore", which is named after a line from the short film. The response line, "And how!" crosses over into the next track, "Between You and Me".
- In the first episode of the 26th season of The Simpsons, Clown in the Dumps, the opening couch gag was created by Don Hertzfeldt. Rejected established the roots of a dystopia by consumerism style of satire through the guise of rejected advertisements; this shortcuts directly to the point. It depicts Homer using a time-traveling remote control to regress to his original 1987 character model, then accidentally going into a distant future incarnation of the show called The Sampsans where he and his family have evolved into grotesque, mindless, catchphrase-spouting mutants. Carey Bodenheimer of CNN wrote: "[The Simpsons] kicked off season 26 with a staggering, Don Hertzfeldt-directed intro sequence."
- The infamous "My anus is bleeding" scene was featured in the Off the Air episode "Holes".

== See also ==
- Criticism of capitalism
- Surreal humour
- Independent animation
- Postmodernist animation
- Arthouse animation
