= Spike and Mike's Festival of Animation =

American animated film festival

- Location: Touring (North America); La Jolla, San Diego, California (origin)
- Founded: 1977
- Founded by: Craig "Spike" Decker; Mike Gribble
- Language: English
- Website: spikeandmike.com (archived)

Spike and Mike's Festival of Animation is a presentation of award-winning animated short films, annually touring throughout theaters, film festivals or college campuses in the United States.

== Background ==
The festival premieres annually in the La Jolla neighborhood, situated in San Diego, California, then tours to theatres, film festivals, and college campuses, currently in about a dozen North American cities.

- The Festival of Animation, later renamed the Classic Festival of Animation, was the original format, started in 1977, and continued into the early 2000s.
- The Sick and Twisted Festival of Animation started in 1990 and runs alongside the original festival (which was renamed the Classic festival in this context), becoming the sole festival in the early 2000s as the Classic festival was phased out.
- The New Gen (Generation) Animation Festival was introduced in 2010, and the latest show was distributed along with the Sick and Twisted.

== History ==
Mellow Manor Productions, Inc. was founded by Craig "Spike" Decker and Mike Gribble, known as "Spike & Mike", in Riverside, California in the 1970s to promote rock bands and special screenings of horror films and movie classics. It was named after Riverside's notorious Victorian house, "The Manor", where Spike, Mike, and many others lived in a communal set. The Manor was the original flagship and production house of the Festival. After spending mid-1977 giving out flyers for the Fantastic Animation Festival, they focused on presenting a flight of animated films and booking the Festival of Animation in venues across the country, which eventually became a 50 city tour.

The Sick and Twisted Festival of Animation began in 1990 at Wheeler Auditorium at UC Berkeley. This is an unrated, adult version of the regular program, featuring mainly satirical, nonsensical, and gross-out cartoons. In the Festival's early days, Spike and Mike took the stage, introducing the films in ringmaster style. 3 foot (0.91 m) balloons were volleyed into fan seating before showtime to burn off street energy. The reel header was flanked by a bagpipe-and-drum battle march over a cartoon of Spike's Scottish Terrier on screen, wreaking havoc on the titles. The dog took the stage and was driven to shred objects.

Before the Festival of Animation, it was difficult to see independent, experimental, and foreign animation. Spike and Mike went on yearly worldwide film hunting expeditions. They signed on animation from the National Film Board of Canada, CalArts, Sheridan, Royal College of Art, Annecy, Zagreb, Hiroshima, Ottawa, and select studios active among the art-house scene that did not have a public venue. In the 1990s, Spike and Mike screened early films from animators including Nick Park, Marv Newland, Tim Burton, Barry Purves, John Lasseter, Andrew Stanton, Pete Docter and Will Vinton.

The shows have toured in theaters, film festivals (such as Cannes, Sundance, Annecy), college campuses, and dynamic events such as the Vans Warped Tour, the Winter X Games, ComiCon, and with the nu-metal band Korn.

Initially, Spike and Mike produced the Classic Festival, and later both the Classic and Sick and Twisted simultaneously, but by the early 2000s, the Classic Festival of Animation was put on hiatus in favor of the Sick and Twisted Festival. Spike and Mike's New Gen Show was created in place of the Classic Festival to show films that did not fit the "sick and twisted" category.

A select set of the short films in the festival was produced at Mellow Manor, some partially and others in full. Artists' conceptualized or unfinished elements were often accepted for financial and pipeline assistance in completing production. Some stages of an artist's production were contracted out for specialized work.

Mike Gribble died of cancer in August 1994, and Spike would continue to produce touring theatrical festivals of animated short films.

In 2023, Skybound Entertainment acquired the festival and plans to revitalize it.

== Contributors ==
In the 1990s, Spike and Mike showed work from animators such as Craig McCracken, Miles Thompson, Danny Antonucci, Benjamin Gluck, David P. Smith, John A. Davis, Keith Alcorn, Steve Fonti, Craig Kellman, and Mike Judge. Several films under Spike and Mike's Mellow Manor Productions were funded either partially or entirely from concept to completion (such as Mike Judge's first Beavis and Butthead films). Working beyond their initial projects, many of these artists have become prominent in the industry and independent creatives, commercial artists, painters, screenwriters, and designers. Several have been nominated for or won honors, including Oscars, Emmys, and Annie Awards.

- Danny Antonucci (creator of The Brothers Grunt and Ed, Edd n Eddy): Lupo the Butcher
- Don Hertzfeldt: Ah, L'Amour, Genre, Lily and Jim, Billy's Balloon, Rejected
- Mike Judge (creator of Beavis and Butt-Head and King of the Hill): Frog Baseball, and Peace, Love & Understanding
- Bill Plympton: Your Face, 25 Ways to Quit Smoking, Nose Hair, Guard Dog and Eat
- Craig McCracken (creator of The Powerpuff Girls, Foster's Home for Imaginary Friends, Wander Over Yonder, and Kid Cosmic): No Neck Joe and Whoopass Stew
- Marv Newland: Bambi Meets Godzilla
- Matt Stone and Trey Parker (creators of South Park): The Spirit Of Christmas
- Nick Park (creator of Wallace & Gromit): Creature Comforts, The Wrong Trousers, and A Close Shave
- Breehn Burns (creator of Dr. Tran): Beyond Grandpa
- Kenn Navarro (creator of Happy Tree Friends)
- Eric Fogel (creator of Celebrity Deathmatch): Mutilator
- John Lasseter (director of Toy Story, A Bug's Life and Cars): Luxo Jr., Red's Dream, Tin Toy and Knick Knack
- Andrew Stanton (director of Finding Nemo and WALL-E): A Story and Somewhere in the Artic
- Pete Docter (animator, director, and writer of Up, Monsters, Inc., Inside Out and Soul): Winter, Palm Springs, and Next Door
- Alison Snowden and David Fine (creators of Bob and Margaret): Bob's Birthday
- Benjamin Gluck: Man's Best Friend
- John Kricfalusi (creator of The Ren & Stimpy Show): Big House Blues, I Miss You (Björk song), Fuck Her Gently and Ain't Close But No Cigar
- John A. Davis (director of Jimmy Neutron: Boy Genius and The Ant Bully): Nanna & Lil' Puss Puss
- Chris Wedge (director of Ice Age, Robots and Epic): Bunny
- Will Vinton: Closed Mondays
- Tim Burton (director of Corpse Bride and Frankenweenie): Vincent
- Teddy Newton (character designer for The Incredibles): Bulimiator and Boys' Night Out
- Barry Purves: Screenplay
- John R. Dilworth (creator of Courage the Cowardly Dog): The Dirdy Birdy
- Frederic Back: Crac
- Jessica Borutski (director of Bunnicula): I Like Pandas
- Kevin Kaliher (creator of A Kitty Bobo Show): Home, Honey I'm High
- Brad Bird (director of The Iron Giant, The Incredibles and Ratatouille): Family Dog
- Brad Ableson (co-creator of Good Vibes and Legends of Chamberlain Heights): Save Virgil
- Bruno Bozzetto (director of Allegro non troppo): Grasshoppers (Cavallette)
- Craig Kellman (character designer for Madagascar, Trolls and Hotel Transylvania): Bulimiator
- Dave Wasson (creator of Time Squad and developer of The Cuphead Show!): The Thing What Lurked in the Tub
- Michael Goroff and Michael Grepp (creators of Loserville Animation Studios): Doodlepops
- Peter Lord (director of Chicken Run): Adam

== See also ==
- International Tournée of Animation, also popular in the late 80s-early 90s
- List of international animation festivals
- The Animation Show, contemporary North American collection
- Nicktoons Film Festival
- Animation Show of Shows
- Fantastic Animation Festival
- The Animation Showcase
- Animation Block Party
- KLIK Amsterdam Animation Festival
- Annecy International Animation Film Festival
