= Psychological drama =

Narrative subgenre of drama with psychological fiction

Psychological drama, or psychodrama, is a subgenre of drama and psychological fiction literatures that generally focuses upon the emotional, mental, and psychological development of the characters within the narrative, which is highlighted by the drama.

== Discussion of the subgenre ==
The roots of the subgenre can be traced back to the early 20th century, emerging from a rich tapestry of literature that focused on the inner workings of the mind. As cinema evolved, filmmakers began to see the potential for the medium to explore complex psychological themes and narratives.

=== Characteristics ===
It can be characterized as primary character-driven, in which attention will be particularly paid to the psychology of the characters, to their intimate problems more than to the storyline context. The characters are confronted with doubts, dilemmas or inner personality conflicts. The challenges they encounter will often force them to react, making them go through a whole psychological process during the film, even a metamorphosis.

=== Related genres ===
It often overlaps with other genres such as crime, fantasy, dark comedy, mystery and science fiction, and it is closely related to psychological horror and psychological thriller. Psychological dramas use these genres' tropes to focus on the human condition and psychological effects, usually in a mature and serious tone, similar to melodrama.

The difference between "drama" and "psychological drama" is that in the latter the focus is more on the psychological character of the characters and on existentialism in general, and not on the context of the narrative itself. So, the end is not necessarily tragic: the main character can doubt himself and sometimes overcome his intimate problems. Psychological drama can be very clearly distinguished from dramedy, as there is no minimal humor in it like Good Will Hunting (1997) and The Truman Show (1998) since the subgenre is rather devoid of humor.

=== Techniques ===
Films utilize a range of techniques to mirror the psychological landscape of their characters. Close-ups and subjective camera angles invite viewers into the character’s personal space, while disjointed editing and surreal imagery can reflect fragmented states of mind. The use of symbolism is also prevalent, with objects, settings, and colors imbued with psychological significance. Music and sound design play crucial roles, often used to heighten the emotional intensity and draw audiences deeper into the psychological experience.

=== Themes ===
Common themes in the subgenre are mental illness, psychological trauma, alienation, self-doubt, and the quest for identity, with narratives often blurring the lines between reality and illusion to reflect the turmoil within the characters’ minds.

It can explore thematic elements including denialism, depression, disability, distorted sequences, dysfunctional relationships, existential crisis, human sexuality, identity crisis, mass hysteria, mood swings, odd behaviors, post-traumatic stress disorder, psychological abuse, psychedelic art, and social issues.

== Examples ==
=== Films ===
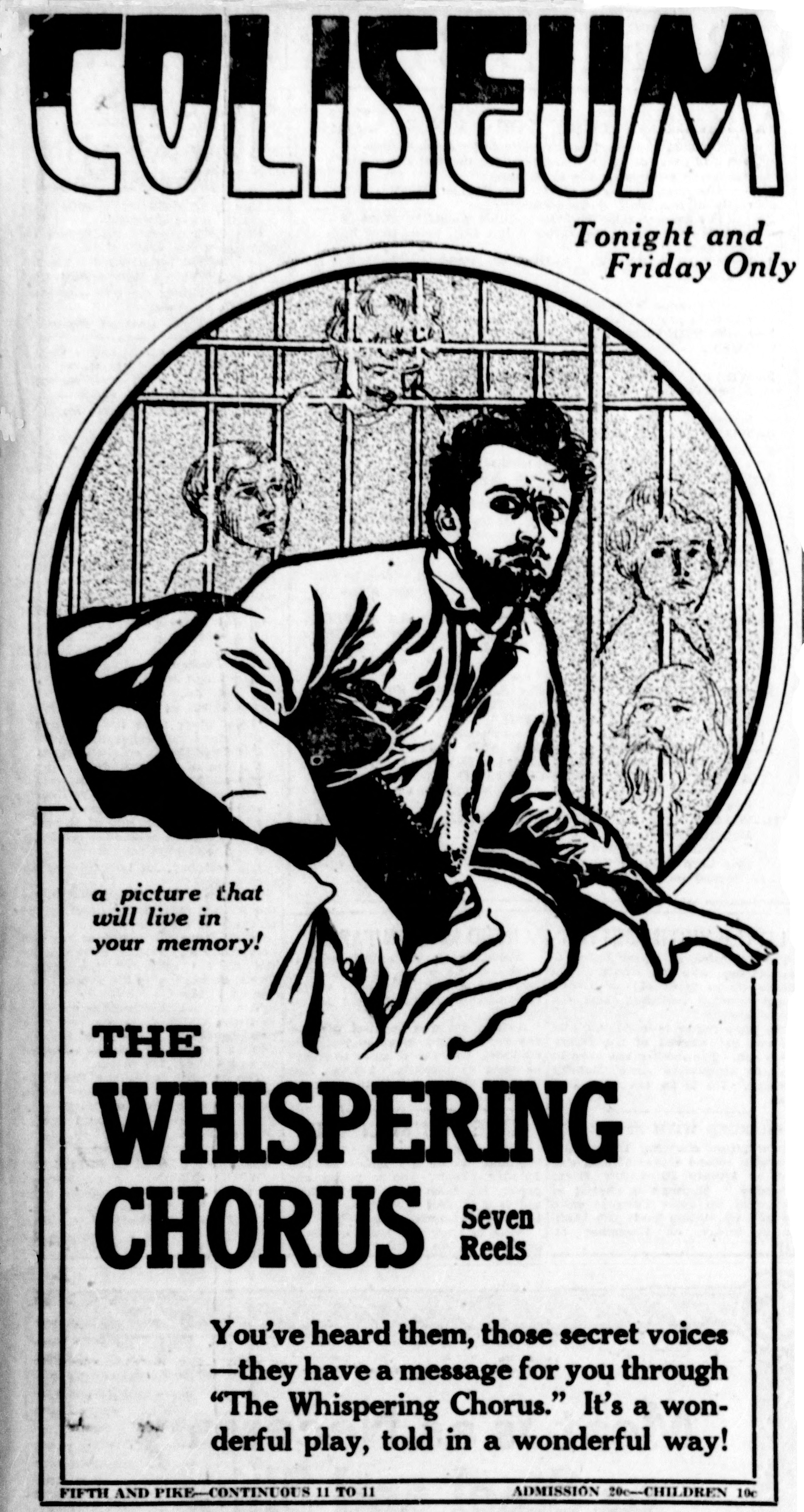
The Whispering Chorus (1918) is considered an early example of this subgenre.

Psychological drama films are generally rooted in traditional drama of the early 20th century such as The Whispering Chorus (1918) and Greed (1924). Early examples of popular psychological drama films include La vuelta al nido (1938), Death of a Salesman (1951), Johnny Belinda (1948), A Place in the Sun (1951), The Snake Pit (1948), and Rapture (1965).

Several films generally within the subgenre have employed controversial social issues and/or psychosexual themes, most notably Stanley Kubrick's Lolita (1962), A Clockwork Orange (1971), and Eyes Wide Shut (1999). Other acclaimed films with similar themes include Last Tango in Paris (1972), One Flew Over the Cuckoo's Nest (1975), The Ninth Configuration (1980), Pink Floyd – The Wall, Sophie's Choice (both 1982) Heavenly Creatures (1994), Breaking the Waves (1996), I Stand Alone (1998), Magnolia (1999), Requiem for a Dream (2000), The Piano Teacher (2001), Elephant (2003), Enter the Void (2009), Biutiful (2010), Shame (2011), Jagten and The Master (both 2012), Nymphomaniac (2013), Whiplash (2014), The Power of the Dog (2021), and Blonde and The Whale (both 2022).

Films have some thematically-linked franchises or trilogies to focus on aspects of human condition and psychological elements, notably Iñárritu's Death trilogy (consists Amores perros (2000), 21 Grams (2003) and Babel (2006)) and Krzysztof Kieślowski's Three Colours trilogy.

Asian films that have contributed to the subgenre, often employ several psychological and social elements. For example: Akira Kurosawa, a Japanese renowned filmmaker, known for his landmark filmography with the subgenre, notably Drunken Angel (1948) and Ikiru (1952). Each films including The Demon (1978), Batch '81 (1982), Silip (1986), Taare Zameen Par (2007), Himizu (2011), Aparisyon (2012), Like Father, Like Son and Norte, the End of History (both 2013), Black Stone (2015), Last Night (2017), and Family History and John Denver Trending (both 2019) and Rewind (2023/2024).

=== Television ===
- Halifax f.p.
- Halifax: Retribution
- Euphoria
- The Affair
- The Bear
- The Sopranos
- Beef
- Criminal
- The Cry
- A Death in California
- The Handmaid's Tale
- Maniac
- Ray Donovan
- Riget
- The Pitt
- This Is Us
- Yellowjackets
- Skins

=== Animated series ===
Animated series of this subgenre that focus on characters' experiences with mental health and psychological trauma include 12 oz. Mouse, The Amazing Digital Circus, Arcane, Bojack Horseman, Common Side Effects, Daria, Invincible, Knights of Guinevere, Moral Orel, South Park, Steven Universe, Steven Universe Future, and Undone.

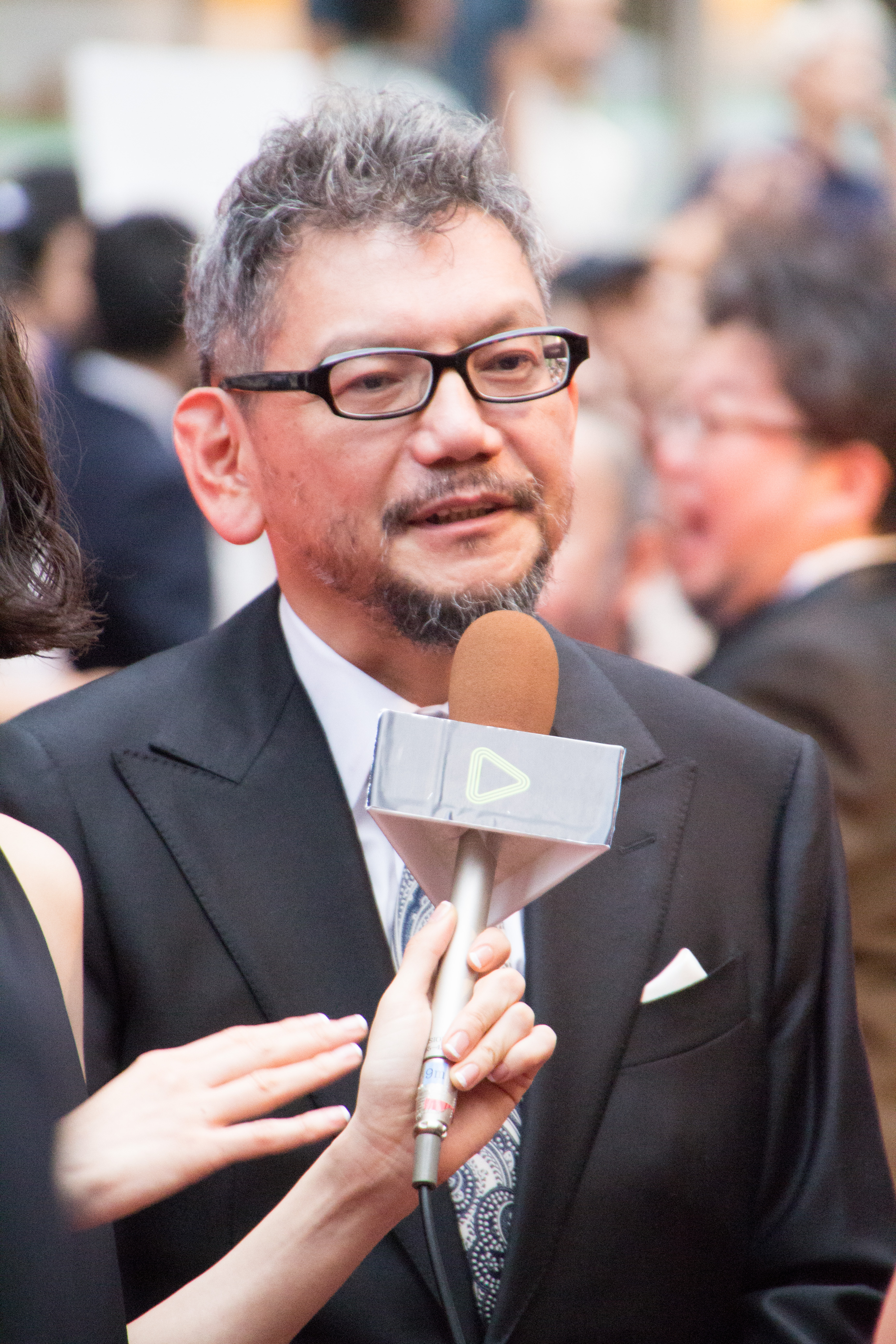
Japanese filmmaker and animator Hideaki Anno created Neon Genesis Evangelion.

Japanese filmmaker and animator Hideaki Anno is best known for creating the anime series Neon Genesis Evangelion, a notorious example of the subgenre that delves into heavy psychological elements in its latter half of the series. The anime series received both acclaim and controversy, particularly the latter surrounding its final two episodes; this led to a reboot in the form of a feature film as an alternative ending.

Additionally, some anime series employing psychological elements include Akagi, The Flowers of Evil, The Fruit of Grisaia, Rascal Does Not Dream of Bunny Girl Senpai, Scum's Wish, The Tatami Galaxy, Welcome to the N.H.K., Wonder Egg Priority and BanG Dream! Ave Mujica.

=== Animated films ===
A Silent Voice, Anomalisa, Belle, Birdboy: The Forgotten Children, It's Such a Beautiful Day, Inside Out (and its sequel), The Missing, Paprika, Perfect Blue, Persepolis, Steven Universe: The Movie, Waltz With Bashir and When Marnie Was There are among the examples of animated films in the subgenre, usually having the characters' portrayals deal with several themes such as anxiety attacks, fear of abandonment or death, and society.

Adam Elliot is a notable animated psychological drama film maker. His films include Harvie Krumpet (2003), Mary and Max (2009), and Memoir of a Snail (2024).

=== Literature ===
- Chicago, Yumi Tamura (2000)
- The Winter Wives, Linden MacIntyre (2021)
- Final Psychodrama, Davide Roccamo (2021)
- Saint X, Alexis Schaitkin (2022)
- Trish, James C. Bennett (2022)

=== Theater ===
- The Chinese Lady, Lloyd Suh (2021)

== Filmmakers ==
- Paul Thomas Anderson – An American filmmaker known for his depictions of flawed characters and exploration of subjects and themes such as dysfunctional families, alienation, loneliness and redemption.
  - Examples: Magnolia (1999), There Will Be Blood (2007), and The Master (2012).
- Sofia Coppola – An American filmmaker, daughter of Francis Ford Coppola, known for psychological drama films about isolation and society.
  - Examples: The Virgin Suicides (1999) and Lost in Translation (2003).
- Todd Field – An American filmmaker well known for his filmography that features psychologically complex characters and themes.
  - Examples: In the Bedroom (2001), Little Children (2006), and Tár (2022).
- Alejandro González Iñárritu – A Mexican filmmaker who has directed numerous films that focus on aspects of the human condition.
- Charlie Kaufman – An American director and screenwriter, whose work explores universal themes like identity crisis, mortality, and the meaning of life through a metaphysical or parapsychological framework.
  - Examples: Eternal Sunshine of the Spotless Mind (2004).
- Andrei Tarkovsky – A Soviet and Russian filmmaker, known for his philosophical and psychological movies dealing with existence, faith and dreamlike memories.
  - Examples: Solaris (1972), Mirror (1975) and Stalker (1979).
- Don Hertzfeldt – An American filmmaker and animator whose films explore themes of mortality, loss, the nature of memory, and existential angst.
  - Examples: It's Such a Beautiful Day (2012), World of Tomorrow (2015) and ME (2024).

== See also ==
- List of drama films
- Cult film
- Hyperlink cinema
- Postmodernist film
- Realism
- Social issue
- Slow cinema
- Tragedy
- Tragicomedy
