= IStopMotion =

Stop motion animation software

iStopMotion
- Developer: Boinx Software
- Release: June 2003 (previously in Beta)
- Platform: MacOS iOS
- Website: istopmotion.com

iStopMotion is a stop motion animation program developed by Boinx Software and first released in 2003. It is available for MacOS and iOS devices.

Although a prelease version of the software was already available, version 1.0 was made available in June 2003. It was later released on the App Store with a version tailored for iPads.

== Reception ==
Chris Elwyn of RedSharkNews stated that "if you’re a hobbyist with a DSLR looking to create some simple animations or a digital artist capturing your workflow, iStopMotion should serve you admirably well." MacTech.com gave the software a rating of 8/10, while JK Sooja of Common Sense Media rated the iPad version of the software 4/5 stars. Warner McGee of Animation World Network stated "[it's] about time stop-motion animators were supported with a world class program like iStopMotion Pro."

== Awards ==
The iStopMotion for iPad app was awarded Best of Show at the 2012 Macworld/iWorld conference. It was again awarded for the updated version in 2013.

The software has also been given away to winners of the Animation Block Party film festival and was included in the software package for Nickelodeon's ME:TV programming block in 2007.
