= Sneeze Me Away =

- Directed by: Ryan Grobins
- Written by: Ryan Grobins
- Music by: Nicole Brady
- Production company: Nezui
- Release date: March 1, 2010
- Running time: 13:21
- Country: South Korea
- Language: English

Sneeze Me Away is a 2010 animated short film written and directed by Ryan Grobins.

== Premise ==
A young boy by the name of Thomas, accidentally enters a fantastic, magical world full of unexpected occurrences and wondrous sights by sneezing with his eyes open, and now must enlist the aid of strange creatures to help him find his way home again.

== Crew ==
| Writer and director: | Ryan Grobins |
| Backgrounds: | Hyojung Kim Grobins |
| Character Animation: | Stanley Darmawan |
| Additional Backgrounds: | Rudy Sumarso, Onesuk Yang |
| Music Composer and Orchestrater: | Nicole Brady |
| Cellist: | Martin Penicka |
| Pianist: | Nicole Brady |
| Sound Designer: | Eddie Bye |
| Additional Sound Production: | Shane Rogers |
| Modeller, Rigger, Additional Animation, FX, Shot Finaller, Editor, Producer: | Ryan Grobins |

== Production ==
Husband and wife team, Ryan and Hyojung spent two years working on the short animated film full-time in South Korea, not including another six months previous to the main production period spent working after hours on the previs in Australia. Hyojung painted the majority of the backgrounds, Stanley Darmawan completed the majority of the character animation, and Ryan did the majority of the other tasks. The backgrounds were all digitally painted in Photoshop, and the characters, while rendered using 3D software, were given a cel-shaded look.

The music was composed and orchestrated by the Australian composer, Nicole Brady. It was performed by The Orchestra of Vienna and Moravian Philharmonic, with solos performed by Martin Penicka (cello) and Nicole Brady (piano).

== Accolades ==
- Hyart Film Festival - Best Animation
- Park City Film Music Festival - Jury Choice Gold Medal for Excellence
- High Desert Shorts International Film Festival - Best Animation
- Canadian International Film Festival - Award of Excellence
- Kids First! Film Festival - Second, Independent Short, Ages 5–8
- Australian Effects & Animation Festival - Finalist
- 8th Annual iP Short Film Contest - Finalist
- Rome International Film Festival - Nominated, Best Animation

== Festivals ==
- Park City Film Music Festival, 2010
- Crystal Palace International Film Festival, 2010
- Animation Block Party, 2010
- Australian Effects and Animation Festival, 2010
- Jiff Theque, Ani Factory, 2010
- Hyart Film Festival, 2010
- Silicon Valley Film Festival, 2010
- Rome International Film Festival, 2010
- Croq'Anime, 2010
- Philly Film and Music Festival, 2010
- Cincinnati Film Festival, 2010
- SoDak Animation Festival, 2010
- Flatland Film Festival, 2010
- Banjaluka, 2010
- Linoleum Animation Festival, 2010
- Radar Hamburg International Independent Film Festival, 2010
- River's Edge International Film Festival, 2010
- African International Film Festival, 2010
- Los Angeles International Children's Film Festival, 2010
- 4th Winter International Festival of Arts, 2011
- Athens Animfest, 2011
- Sacramento International Film Festival, 2011
- Downtown Boca Film Festival, 2011
- High Desert Shorts International Film Festival, 2011
- California International Animation Festival, 2011
- Puerto Rico International Film Festival, 2011
