= The Meaning of Life (2005 film) =

- Directed by: Don Hertzfeldt
- Written by: Don Hertzfeldt
- Produced by: Don Hertzfeldt
- Cinematography: Don Hertzfeldt
- Edited by: Rebecca Moline
- Production company: Bitter Films
- Release date: 21 January 2005
- Running time: 12 minutes
- Country: United States
- Language: English

The Meaning of Life is a 35mm animated short film, written and directed by Don Hertzfeldt in 2005. The twelve-minute film is the result of almost four years of production and tens of thousands of drawings, single-handedly paper animated and photographed by Hertzfeldt.

In the film, the evolution of the human race is traced from prehistory (mankind as blob forms), through today (mankind as teeming crowds of selfish, fighting, or lost individuals), to hundreds of millions of years into the future as the human species evolves into countless new forms; all of them still behaving the same way. The film concludes in the extreme future, with two creatures (apparently an adult and child subspecies of future human), having a conversation in their own language about the meaning of life on a colorful shore.

Like all of Hertzfeldt's films prior to World of Tomorrow, The Meaning of Life was photographed entirely in-camera, without the use of computers, post-production compositing, or digital tools. The special effects were created via multiple exposures, optical light effects, and trick photography. Though working with an antique camera, Hertzfeldt often had to invent new techniques to capture his visuals.

The film premiered at the Sundance Film Festival and toured film and animation festivals in 2005–06. Though its abstract nature puzzled some critics, it received almost universally positive reviews. The Atlanta Journal-Constitution called the film "the closest thing on film yet to Kubrick's 2001: A Space Odyssey."

In 2006, The Meaning of Life was remastered and restored in high definition for inclusion on the DVD, "Bitter Films Volume 1", a compilation of Don Hertzfeldt's short films from 1995 to 2005. Special features relating to The Meaning of Life include a time-lapse documentary called "Watching Grass Grow" of Hertzfeldt animating the film (apparently over the course of a few years), another documentary about the creation of the special effects narrated by Hertzfeldt, original pencil tests, and dozens of pages devoted to Hertzfeldt's original sketches, storyboards, notes, and deleted ideas from the film.

In 2009, Hertzfeldt noted, "I don't often make the same sort of movie twice in a row. It's always been whatever's next in my head. From a commercial standpoint I guess I've made some pretty inscrutable decisions, like following up "Rejected" with a sprawling abstract film about human evolution, but it's really just been whichever ideas won't go away at the time. There's always a lot of new things I'd like to try."

In 2014, Time Out New York named the film one of the "thirty best animated short films ever made."

In 2015, the film was remastered from a new 4K scan, for inclusion on the Blu-ray release of Hertzfeldt's It's Such a Beautiful Day.
