= Ah, L'Amour =

1995 animated short film directed by Don Hertzfeldt

- Directed by: Don Hertzfeldt
- Written by: Don Hertzfeldt
- Produced by: Don Hertzfeldt
- Cinematography: Don Hertzfeldt
- Edited by: Don Hertzfeldt
- Music by: Don Hertzfeldt
- Animation by: Don Hertzfeldt
- Production company: Bitter Films
- Release date: 1995
- Running time: 2:16
- Country: US
- Language: None

Ah, L'Amour (1995, French for 'Ah, Love') is Don Hertzfeldt's first 16mm student animated short film, completed at the age of 18 at UC Santa Barbara.

Though animated in a beginning film production class and never meant to be exhibited, the short had a long life at animation festivals, launching Hertzfeldt into cult status at a young age. In 1998, the short won the Grand Prize Award for "World's Funniest Cartoon" from the HBO U.S. Comedy Arts Festival.

== Summary ==
The cartoon is a satire of toxic men. In it, a pickup artist is violently torn apart by the women he targets, viewed only through his own one-sided, ridiculously misogynistic point of view. Hertzfeldt plays the part of a mentally unwell animator who is losing his grip on his sanity while animating, an idea he'd later revisit in other early "meta" shorts Genre and Rejected.

== Music ==
The soundtrack is acoustic guitar music, performed by Hertzfeldt on a boom box in his dorm room.

== Release ==
In the 1990s, the cartoon screened nationwide in theaters as part of the Spike and Mike's Festival of Animation tour as well as the Spike and Mike "Sick and Twisted" Festival of Animation midnight show.

In 2006, the original 16mm negative was digitally restored and remastered for release on the extensive "Bitter Films Volume 1" DVD compilation of Hertzfeldt's 1995-2005 films. For the DVD, Hertzfeldt performed an alternate guitar soundtrack as a special feature, approximately 10 years after recording the original. Other special features for Ah L'Amour include Don's original production sketches and notes, as well as a very rare 1993 video short that Don created in high school that is a precursor to the film.

== Reception ==
Though Hertzfeldt was embarrassed by the crudely animated student film, it was given positive reviews by critics. Zach Roberts of Stanford Daily Online called it a "witty commentary on relationships," Ward Triplett of Kansas City Star called it "cynical but hilarious," and Evan Backes of Stay Tooned called it "purely genius." In 1998 it won the HBO Comedy Arts Festival Grand Prize Award for "World's Funniest Cartoon". The short has since become a cult classic.
