= Paper Trail (film) =

2026 animated short film by Don Hertzfeldt

Paper Trail is a 2026 animated short film by Don Hertzfeldt.

== Summary ==
Described as "A life, seen through paper", the film explores the offscreen life of the mind of an average individual named Stevie Richardson from childhood to adulthood (e.g. having written conversations with a girl named Lindsay during his school years; when he eventually gets work as a well-paid clerk) via a collection of doodles, homeworks, tests, payment bills, applications and signatures.

== Production ==
Naomi Alligator composed the music for the film.

The camera-less film was made using Photoshop and Final Cut 7.

== Release and reception ==
The film premiered at the 2026 Sundance Film Festival where it was awarded the Special Jury Prize for Creative Vision. The jury described the film as "a meticulous and brilliantly crafted example of how a single idea, which unfolds with vision and ingenuity, can expand our way of seeing the world... a roving journey of one man's life, twisting and turning along the way with moments that are at once playful, banal, sincere, and, in the end, deeply moving."

In its review, Cineuropa called Paper Trail "one of the most poignant milestones in animation history."

The jury at the 2026 San Francisco International Film Festival called Paper Trail "one of those rare short films that comes around only every so often, and one that will likely go on to be referenced as a tentpole of animated storytelling... [it] may well be Hertzfeldt's masterstroke."

== Accolades ==
- Special Jury Prize for Creative Vision, 2026 Sundance Film Festival
- Annecy Crystal, the first time an American film won the grand prize at the Annecy International Animation Film Festival in 22 years.
- Award for "Visual Poetry" from the Hiroshima International Animation Festival
- Audience Award and Best Animated Short Film, SXSW
- Golden Gate Award from the San Francisco International Film Festival
