= Annie Awards =

Film award

- Current: 53rd Annie Awards
- Awarded for: Excellence in animation
- Country: United States
- Presented by: ASIFA-Hollywood
- First award: November 1972; 54 years ago
- Website: annieawards.org

The Annie Awards are accolades which the Los Angeles branch of the International Animated Film Association, ASIFA-Hollywood, has presented each year since 1972 to recognize excellence in animation shown in American cinema and television. Originally designed to celebrate lifetime or career contributions to animation, the award has been given to individual works since 1992, becoming the biggest awards ceremony in the United States for the animation industry.

Membership in ASIFA-Hollywood is divided into three main categories: General Member (for professionals), Patron (for enthusiasts of animation), and Student Member. Members in each category pay a fee to belong to the branch. Selected professional members of the branch are permitted to vote to decide the awards.

The 48th and 49th Annie Awards ceremonies were held virtually on April 16, 2021, and March 12, 2022, respectively, due to the then ongoing COVID-19 pandemic.

== History ==
In 1972, June Foray first conceived the idea of awards for excellence in the field of animation. With the approval of ASIFA-Hollywood president Nick Bosustow, an Annie Award ceremony was organized. The first ceremony was held at the banquet room of Sportsmen's Lodge on Ventura Boulevard in Studio City, Los Angeles, California. Max Fleischer and Dave Fleischer were the first to be honored by the first Annie Awards for creating Betty Boop, bringing Popeye, and Olive Oyl to the animated screen, and for inventing the technique of rotoscoping.

=== Naming "Annie Awards" ===
According to Foray, her husband Hobart Donavan suggested that the awards be called "Annie", because they are presented for excellence in animation.

=== Trophy ===
The first trophy for the Annie Award trophy was presented in the second award ceremony, to Walter Lantz, the founder of Walter Lantz Productions and creator of Woody Woodpecker. Made of wood and plastic, it was shaped like a zoetrope. The next year, Tom Woodward designed the trophy now presented.

== Award categories ==
=== Current categories ===
As of 2026, 38 categories are presented including for film and television productions.

Production

- Best Animated Feature
- Best Animated Feature – Independent
- Best Animated Special Production
- Best Animated Short Subject
- Best Animated Sponsored Production
- Best General Audience Animated Television Broadcast Production
- Best TV Production for Children
- Best TV Production for Preschool Children
- Best Student Film
- Best TV/Media – Limited Series
- Best International Anime Production for TV/Media

Individual achievement in Film

- Outstanding Animated Effects
- Outstanding Character Animation – Animation
- Outstanding Character Animation – Live Action
- Outstanding Character Design
- Outstanding Directing
- Outstanding Editorial
- Outstanding Music
- Outstanding Production Design
- Outstanding Storyboarding
- Outstanding Voice Acting
- Outstanding Writing

Individual achievement in Television, Broadcast and Video Game

- Outstanding Animated Effects
- Outstanding Character Animation – TV/Media
- Outstanding Character Animation – Video Game
- Outstanding Character Design
- Outstanding Directing
- Outstanding Editorial
- Outstanding Music
- Outstanding Producing
- Outstanding Production Design
- Outstanding Storyboarding
- Outstanding Voice Acting
- Outstanding Writing

Juried awards

- June Foray Award
- Ub Iwerks Award
- Winsor McCay Award
- Special Achievement in Animation
- Certificates of Merit

=== Defunct categories ===
- Best Animated Home Entertainment Production
- Best Virtual Reality Production
- Outstanding Animated Effects – Live Action
- Best Animated Television Production
- Best Animated Video Game

== Balloting controversies and criticism ==
=== 2008 Best Short Subject mixup ===
In 2008, the Annie Award nominees for Best Short Subject included two Walt Disney cartoons, a Pixar short, and two independent films: Picnic Pictures' The Chestnut Tree, and Don Hertzfeldt's short Everything Will Be OK. Official rules for the Annie Awards state that voting members must view all nominated achievements in their entirety before casting their ballot for a winner. Members are directed to view the nominated films on a secure website.

When the online ballot launched on January 15, the two independent films were not included for voters to judge. ASIFA acknowledged this error over a week later, at which point all the votes were reportedly thrown out and the balloting system was reset. Voters were instructed to return and re-vote the category. "The Chestnut Tree" was now uploaded properly to the ballot; however, Everything Will Be OK was again not included: this time, the online ballot only played a portion of this film's 17-minute running time to voters, abruptly cutting out in the middle of a scene. ASIFA again took several days to repair the ballot, but this time allowed voting to continue.

By the time the ballot officially closed on February 1, Everything Will Be OK was only available to voters for less than 24 hours of the entire 18-day voting period. Even though ASIFA apologized to Hertzfeldt, they took no further action and carried on with the event, awarding the prize to the Pixar short, Your Friend the Rat. (Hertzfeldt would eventually win the award for his 2015 Oscar-nominated short film World of Tomorrow.)

=== Dreamworks upset and Disney boycott ===
In 2009, DreamWorks Animation's Kung Fu Panda swept the Annie Awards in a surprise upset over Pixar's WALL-E, which won no Annie Awards but did go on to win the Academy Award for Best Animated Feature. Many felt that the vote had been rigged: DreamWorks at the time gave each of their employees a free membership to ASIFA-Hollywood, which in turn conferred voting rights. (For most film awards, voting rights cannot be bought but must be conferred by one's peers.)

As a result, Walt Disney Studios decided to cease submissions and support for the 2010 Annie Awards from their two animated film divisions, Walt Disney Animation Studios and Pixar. Due to Disney's complaints, ASIFA-Hollywood changed the rules on voting for individual achievement categories, making those categories only available to professionals within those categories. ASIFA-Hollywood head Antran Manoogian also said that Annie voters would in the future have to be approved by a committee and non-professionals would now be ineligible to vote.

That was not enough for Disney president Ed Catmull, who had called for an advisory committee of relevant executives representing each studio to recommend rule changes to the ASIFA board. Catmull said, "We believe there is an issue with the way the Annies are judged, and have been seeking a mutually agreeable solution with the board. Although some initial steps have been taken, the board informed us that no further changes would be made to address our concerns." ASIFA-Hollywood did not agree to this demand.

Disney and Pixar rejoined the Annie Awards in 2011, with no formal announcement. Ironically, earlier that year, the Annie Awards had a near-exact replay of the 2009 results, with DreamWorks Animation's How to Train Your Dragon sweeping all the major Annie Awards over Pixar's Toy Story 3, which went on to win the Academy Award for Best Animated Feature and also received a nomination for Best Picture.

== Records ==
=== Film ===
The following nominees (motion pictures and direct-to-video films) received multiple nominations:

Nominations	Film
16	The Incredibles
16	Kung Fu Panda
16	Wallace & Gromit: The Curse of the Were-Rabbit
15	How to Train Your Dragon
15	The Iron Giant
14	Inside Out
13	Coco
13	The Boxtrolls
13	The Hunchback of Notre Dame
13	Ratatouille
12	Finding Nemo
12	Kung Fu Panda 2
12	Mulan
12	Shrek
11	The Emperor's New Groove
11	Tarzan
11	Zootopia
11	Incredibles 2
10	Brave
10	The Breadwinner
10	Coraline
10	Elio
10	Frozen
10	The Good Dinosaur
10	How to Train Your Dragon 2
10	KPop Demon Hunters
10	Kubo and the Two Strings
10	Lilo & Stitch
10	Monsters University
10	Ralph Breaks the Internet
10	Raya and the Last Dragon
10	Rise of the Guardians
10	Soul
10	Surf's Up
10	Wolfwalkers
10	The Wild Robot
10	Wreck-It Ralph
9
9	Anastasia
9	Cars
9	Encanto
9	Guillermo del Toro's Pinocchio
9	Madagascar
9	Nimona
9	Puss in Boots
9	Rango
9	Toy Story
9	Toy Story 2
9	Up
8
8	Cats Don't Dance
8	Flushed Away
8	Frozen II
8	Hotel Transylvania
8	Luca
8	Missing Link
8	The Mitchells vs. the Machines
8	Monsters, Inc.
8	Over the Hedge
8	ParaNorman
8	The Princess and the Frog
8	Rio
8	The Road to El Dorado
8	Spirit: Stallion of the Cimarron
8	Winnie the Pooh
7	Big Hero 6
7	The Boy and the Heron
7	Brother Bear
7	Cars 2
7	Despicable Me
7	Early Man
7	Ice Age
7	Klaus
7	Little Amélie or the Character of Rain
7	Minions
7	Onward
7	Pocahontas
7	Song of the Sea
7	Spider-Man: Across the Spider-Verse
7	Spider-Man: Into the Spider-Verse
7	Shark Tale
7	Shrek 2
7	Suzume
7	Treasure Planet
7	Turning Red
7	Wallace & Gromit: Vengeance Most Fowl
7	WALL-E
7	Zootopia 2
6	Hercules
6	Arthur Christmas
6	Atlantis: The Lost Empire
6	The Boss Baby
6	The Croods: A New Age
6	Elemental
6	Ernest & Celestine
6	How to Train Your Dragon: The Hidden World
6	I Lost My Body
6	The Lego Movie
6	The Lion King
6	Megamind
6	Moana
6	Monster House
6	Open Season
6	Osmosis Jones
6	Over the Moon
6	Puss in Boots: The Last Wish
6	The Sea Beast
6	Toy Story 4
6	Teenage Mutant Ninja Turtles: Mutant Mayhem
6	The Willoughbys
5	Anomalisa
5	Arco
5	The Adventures of Tintin: The Secret of the Unicorn
5	The Bad Guys
5	The Bad Guys 2
5	Beauty and the Beast: The Enchanted Christmas
5	Belle
5	Bolt
5	The Book of Life
5	Dinosaur
5	Fantasia 2000
5	Frankenweenie
5	A Goofy Movie
5	Ghost in the Shell
5	Horton Hears a Who!
5	The Jungle Book 2
5	The Illusionist
5	Inside Out 2
5	Mary Poppins Returns
5	The Peanuts Movie
5	The Pirates! In an Adventure with Scientists!
5	The Prince of Egypt
5	The Red Turtle
5	Robot Dreams
5	Shaun the Sheep Movie
5	Shrek Forever After
5	That Christmas
5	Vivo
4	Abominable
4	Flee
4	Ghost in the Shell 2: Innocence
4	The Grinch
4	Isle of Dogs
4	Kung Fu Panda 3
4	Legend of the Guardians: The Owls of Ga'Hoole
4	Marcel the Shell with Shoes On
4	Minions: The Rise of Gru
4	Moana 2
4	Space Jam
4	Spirited Away
4	Trolls World Tour
4	Ultraman: Rising
4	Weathering With You
3	A Shaun the Sheep Movie: Farmageddon
3	The Big Bad Fox and Other Tales...
3	Calamity Jane
3	Captain Underpants: The First Epic Movie
3	Chicken for Linda!
3	Despicable Me 3
3	Flow
3	Ice Age: Continental Drift
3	Kung Fu Panda 4
3	The Lego Batman Movie
3	South Park: Bigger, Longer & Uncut
3	The SpongeBob SquarePants Movie
3	Toy Story 3
3	Wendell & Wild
3	The Wind Rises

The following winners (motion pictures and direct-to-video films) received multiple awards:

Awards	Film
11	Coco
10	How to Train Your Dragon
10	The Incredibles
10	Inside Out
10	KPop Demon Hunters
10	Kung Fu Panda
10	Mulan
10	Wallace & Gromit: The Curse of the Were-Rabbit
9	Finding Nemo
9	The Iron Giant
9	Ratatouille
9	The Wild Robot
8	The Mitchells vs. the Machines
8	Shrek
8	Toy Story
7	Klaus
7	Soul
7	Spider-Man: Across the Spider-Verse
7	Spider-Man: Into the Spider-Verse
7	Toy Story 2
6	How to Train Your Dragon 2
6	Zootopia
5	Flushed Away
5	Frozen
5	Guillermo del Toro's Pinocchio
5	Wolfwalkers
5	Wreck-It Ralph
4	Hercules
4	Pocahontas
4	Rango
4	Spirit: Stallion of the Cimarron
4	Spirited Away
3	Coraline
3	The Emperor's New Groove
3	Encanto
3	Fantasia 2000
3	I Lost My Body
3	Kubo and the Two Strings
3	The Lion King
3	Marcel the Shell with Shoes On
3	Over the Hedge
3	The Princess and the Frog
2
2	Avatar: The Way of Water
2	The Boxtrolls
2	The Boy and the Heron
2	Cats Don't Dance
2	Flow
2	Kung Fu Panda 2
2	Nimona
2	Puss in Boots: The Last Wish
2	Up

=== TV ===
The following nominees (TV shows, specials, and special presentations) received multiple wins and nominations:

Nominations	Show
50	The Simpsons
34	Mickey Mouse
24	The Fairly OddParents
24	King of the Hill
21	Futurama
20	Foster's Home for Imaginary Friends
19	Star Wars: The Clone Wars
17	SpongeBob SquarePants
17	Bob's Burgers
16	Arcane
14	Dragons: Riders of Berk
14	Gravity Falls
14	Love, Death & Robots
12	Adventure Time
12	Dexter's Laboratory
12	The Penguins of Madagascar
11	My Life as a Teenage Robot
11	Family Guy
11	Kung Fu Panda: Legends of Awesomeness
11	Prep & Landing: Naughty vs. Nice
10	Batman Beyond
10	Pinky and the Brain
10	Samurai Jack
10	Trollhunters
9	Animaniacs
9	The Powerpuff Girls
9	Rapunzel's Tangled Adventure
8	Hilda
8	Kung Fu Panda: Secrets of the Furious Five
8	Prep & Landing
7	Avatar: The Last Airbender
7	Batman: The Animated Series
7	Blue Eye Samurai
7	The Boy, the Mole, the Fox and the Horse
7	Invader ZIM
7	Kim Possible
7	The Mighty B!
7	Star Wars: Visions
6	Chowder
6	Cow and Chicken
6	El Tigre: The Adventures of Manny Rivera
6	Johnny Bravo
6	Justin Time
6	Merry Madagascar
6	Oni: Thunder God's Tale
6	The Amazing World of Gumball
6	The House
6	The Ren & Stimpy Show
6	Timon & Pumbaa
6	Win or Lose
5	101 Dalmatians: The Series
5	The Angry Beavers
5	Asterix and Obelix: The Big Fight
5	Common Side Effects
5	Danny Phantom
5	Gargoyles
5	Great Minds Think For Themselves
5	Kizazi Moto: Generation Fire
5	The Legend of Korra
5	Max Steel
5	Mickey Mouse Works
5	Scared Shrekless
5	Steven Universe
5	TRON: Uprising
5	The Tick
5	Time Squad

The following winners (TV shows, specials, and special presentations) received multiple awards:

Awards	Show
34	The Simpsons
21	Mickey Mouse
16	Arcane
9	Futurama
8	Love, Death & Robots
7	Hilda
6	Blue Eye Samurai
6	Samurai Jack
6	SpongeBob SquarePants
5	Avatar: The Last Airbender
5	Foster's Home for Imaginary Friends
5	Kung Fu Panda Holiday
5	Pinky and the Brain
4	Dragons: Riders of Berk
4	The Boy, the Mole, the Fox and the Horse
4	The Fairly OddParents
4	King of the Hill
4	The Penguins of Madagascar
4	Prep & Landing: Naughty vs. Nice
4	Kung Fu Panda: Secrets of the Furious Five
4	Trollhunters
3	Batman Beyond
3	Bojack Horseman
3	Cow and Chicken
3	Dexter's Laboratory
3	Duckman
3	Family Guy
3	Marvel's Moon Girl and Devil Dinosaur

=== Other ===
==== Films (feature-lengths and shorts) ====
- First non-English-language film to win Best Animated Feature
  - Spirited Away (2002)
- First stop-motion film to win Best Animated Feature
  - Wallace and Gromit: The Curse of the Were-Rabbit (2005)
- Most awards won by a feature-length film: 11
  - Coco (2017)
- Most awards won by a short film: 4
  - The Boy, the Mole, the Fox and the Horse (2022)
- Highest clean sweep by a feature-length film: 10
  - KPop Demon Hunters (2025)
- Most awards sweep every nominations with more than 3 by feature-length films: 17 films
  - Coco (2017); with all 11 categories won out of 13 nominations.
  - The Incredibles (2004), Wallace and Gromit: The Curse of the Were-Rabbit (2005) and Kung Fu Panda (2008); with all 10 categories won out of 16 nominations.
  - The Iron Giant (1999) and How to Train Your Dragon (2010); with all 10 categories won out of 15 nominations.
  - Mulan (1998); with all 10 categories won out of 12 nominations.
  - KPop Demon Hunters (2025); with all 10 categories won out of 10 nominations.
  - Finding Nemo (2002); with all 9 categories won out of 12 nominations
  - The Wild Robot (2024); with all 9 categories won out of 10 nominations
  - The Mitchells vs. the Machines (2021); with all 8 categories won out of 8 nominations.
  - Spider-Man: Into the Spider-Verse (2018), Klaus (2019) and Spider-Man: Across the Spider-Verse (2023); with all 7 categories won out of 7 nominations.
  - Pocahontas (1995); with all 4 categories won out of 7 nominations.
  - Spirited Away (2002); with all 4 categories won out of 4 nominations.
  - I Lost My Body (2019); with all 3 categories won out of 3 nominations.
- Most nominations received by feature-length films: 16
  - The Incredibles (2004), Wallace and Gromit: The Curse of the Were-Rabbit (2005) and Kung Fu Panda (2008)
- Most nominations received by a short film: 9
  - Prep & Landing (2009)
- Most nominations received without a single win by a feature-length film: 0 out of 13
  - The Hunchback of Notre Dame (1996)

==== Television ====
- Most wins received by a single season: 9
  - Arcane (first season, 2021)
- Most awards sweep every nominations with more than 3 in a single year
  - Arcane (first season, 2021); with all 9 categories won out of 9 nominations

== See also ==
- List of animation awards
- List of Annie Awards ceremonies
- International Animated Film Association
