= The Animation Show =

Touring festival of short films

The Animation Show was a touring theatrical festival of animated short films, created and curated by animators Mike Judge and Don Hertzfeldt.

Following the demise of other American touring festivals of animation, such as Spike and Mike's Classic Festival of Animation, (Note: In the early 2000s, Spike and Mike phased out their general "Classic" festival of animation, but retained their adult "Sick and Twisted" festival; thus general animation did not have an outlet through this channel.) the stated purpose of the Animation Show was to bring animated short films back into proper cinemas, where most of them were intended to be seen, and to "free these artists from the dungeons of Internet exhibition". It was the first-ever festival of animation to be curated by working animators and was described as a passion project by its creators, not something intended to turn a big profit. A sister series of Animation Show DVD volumes were also released through MTV Home Video and Paramount Home Entertainment, but the producers stressed that the theatrical and DVD programs were different, to encourage audiences to not just wait for the DVD, but to visit the cinema. As stated in the Animation Show programs and flyers, once the theatrical edition of each Show was out of cinemas, it was "gone forever".

Mike Judge and Don Hertzfeldt programmed the first three Animation Show programs together, with the first edition released theatrically in 2003. Don Hertzfeldt parted ways with the festival in 2008 and the fourth season of the Animation Show was released without his involvement.

In 2025, Hertzfeldt returned to curation with Animation Mixtape, a similar anthology of international animated short films. A non-profit venture, Mixtape is designed to only screen in theaters, with all net box office earnings to be paid directly to the animators in the program.

== History ==
=== 2003 ===
The first season's 2003 tour visited over 200 North American theaters with occasional appearances from the producers (Mike Judge and Don Hertzfeldt) and Q&A's with many of the award-winning filmmakers involved. The program included "everything from forgotten classics to the very latest in computer animation". This included many current Academy Award nominees, "Vincent" by Tim Burton, as well as the restoration of a 5-minute excerpt from Ward Kimball's 1957 Disney film, "Mars and Beyond". The tour concluded with the DVD release of Animation Show, Volume One.

=== 2005 ===
The second Animation Show toured throughout 2005, featuring Bill Plympton's Guard Dog, the 1999 National Film Board of Canada's classic When the Day Breaks, Don Hertzfeldt's The Meaning of Life and new films by animators Peter Cornwell, Georges Schwizgebel and PES.

=== 2007 ===
The third season of The Animation Show began its nationwide release in January 2007, featuring the return of Mike Judge's Beavis and Butt-Head. The third tour also showcased new work by animators Joanna Quinn, PES, Bill Plympton, and Don Hertzfeldt.

=== 2008 ===
The fourth Animation Show was released in 2008. It included new work by animators PES, Bill Plympton and Georges Schwizgebel as well as the Academy Award nominated short This Way Up.

== See also ==
- The Animation Showcase
- Animation Show of Shows
- Fantastic Animation Festival
- International Tournée of Animation
- Spike and Mike's Festival of Animation
- Nicktoons Film Festival
