= Fantastic Animation Festival =

- Theatrical release poster
- Directed by: Dean A. Berko (executive director); Christopher Padilla (concept director)
- Narrated by: Paul Frees
- Edited by: Robert Leighton
- Music by: Richard M. Audd
- Production company: Voyage Productions
- Distributed by: Cinema Shares International Distribution
- Release date: May 27, 1977
- Running time: 90 minutes
- Country: United States
- Language: English

Fantastic Animation Festival is a package film of animation segments, set mostly to music and released in theaters in 1977. It was one of the earliest of the sort of collections typified by Computer Animation Festival and Spike and Mike's Festival of Animation (the co-founders of the latter, formerly known as Festival of Animation, send out flyers of Fantastic Animation Festival).

== Summary ==
Included in its original form of 16 segments were the first national appearance of Will Vinton's Claymation (Closed Mondays and Mountain Music), Bambi Meets Godzilla, Cat Stevens' animated promo for his song "Moonshadow" that was shown at his early concerts, and a previously seen Max Fleischer Superman cartoon from the 1940s (The Mechanical Monsters). The original running time was 107 minutes, which was later edited down to 90 minutes, and then edited for television to 80 minutes.

== Segments ==
The following are in running order:

- "Welcome to the world of animation" introduction; voice-over by Paul Frees, who also narrated the trailer
- French Windows, the rotoscope animation to Pink Floyd's "One of These Days" by Ian Eames (1972)
- Icarus, a Romanian clay animation by Mihail Badica (1974)
- A Short History of the Wheel, by Loren Bowie (1974)
- Cosmic Cartoon, animated and directed by Eric Ladd and Steven Lisberger (1973)
- The Last Cartoon Man, by Derek Lamb & Jeffrey Hale (1973)
- Au Bout Du Fil Cradle (Cat's Cradle), by Paul Driessen (National Film Board of Canada) (1974)
- Moonshadow, Cat Stevens' story of Teaser and the Firecat, narrated by Spike Milligan, by Charles Jenkins (1972)
- Oiseau de Nuit (Nightbird), by Bernard Palacios (1975)
- Room and Board, by Randy Cartwright (1974)
- Bambi Meets Godzilla, by Marv Newland (1969)
- Mountain Music, a claymation by Will Vinton (1975)
- Light, by Jordan Belson (1974)
- The Mechanical Monsters, a public domain 1941 Fleischer Studios cartoon
- Stranger, a 1971 Levi Strauss Jeans commercial by Chris Blum, narrated by Ken Nordine
- Uncola, a 1975 7Up commercial by Robert Abel and Associates
- Mirror People, by Kathy Rose (1974)
- Kick Me, by Robert Swarthe, a 1975 Best Animated Short Film nominee
- Closed Mondays, a claymation by Will Vinton and Bob Gardiner (1974 Academy Award Winner for Best Animated Short Film)

== Notes ==
The 1941 Academy Award-nominated Superman (AKA The Mad Scientist) was featured on the TV version while the episode ended with Mirror People instead of Closed Mondays. The Last Cartoon Man, Au Bout Du Fil Cradle (Cat's Cradle), Room and Board, and Kick Me, were also omitted from the TV version to edit it down to 80 minutes.

== Soundtrack ==
The fanfare music was done by Richard Audd.

== See also ==
- International Tournee of Animation
- Animation Show of Shows
- The Animation Show
