= Nu är det jul igen =

Scandinavian Christmas song

"Nu är det jul igen" (Danish: "Nu er det jul igen") (English: Now it is Christmas again) is an old Christmas song originating in Scandinavia, and often sung when dancing around the Christmas tree. Lyrically, the song first states that Christmas lasts all the way until Easter, before mentioning that this is not the case, since the fasting season comes between them.

Danish poet Mads Hansen from Vester Skerninge wrote a longer lyrics version, "Nu har vi jul igen".

The song was recorded by the Gregg Smith Singers as "Now it is Yule again" in a four-part, a capella, mixed-voice chorus arrangement by Gregg Smith on their 1960 album Christmas Carols from Around the World (Crown Records CLP 5194).

== In popular culture ==
- The song was featured in the Arthur Christmas special "Arthur's Perfect Christmas".
- The fluffy Swedish Meatball characters are seen dancing to it in the short film Rejected.
- During the Christmas festivities in the film Fanny and Alexander by Ingmar Bergman, the family dances to this song.

== Publication ==
- Julens önskesångbok, 1997, under the lines "Tjugondag Knut dansar julen ut", credited as "folktune"
