= World of Tomorrow (film) =

Series of short films by Don Hertzfeldt (2015–2020)

- Theatrical release poster for Episode 1
- Directed by: Don Hertzfeldt
- Written by: Don Hertzfeldt
- Produced by: Don Hertzfeldt
- Starring: Julia Pott; Winona Mae (Episodes 1 & 2); Jack Parrett (Episode 3)
- Cinematography: Don Hertzfeldt
- Edited by: Don Hertzfeldt
- Production company: Bitter Films
- Release dates: March 31, 2015 (Episode 1); October 20, 2017 (Episode 2); October 9, 2020 (Episode 3)
- Running time: 73 minutes: 16 minutes (Episode 1); 23 minutes (Episode 2); 34 minutes (Episode 3)
- Country: United States
- Language: English

World of Tomorrow is a series of American animated science fiction short films written, directed, produced, animated, and edited by Don Hertzfeldt. The series began with World of Tomorrow (2015), followed by World of Tomorrow Episode Two: The Burden of Other People's Thoughts (2017) and World of Tomorrow Episode Three: The Absent Destinations of David Prime (2020). All three films feature the voice of Julia Pott, frequently alongside Hertzfeldt's four-year-old niece Winona Mae, who was recorded while drawing and playing. Her spontaneous, natural vocal reactions and questions were then edited into the stories to create her character.

The first film was nominated for Best Animated Short Film at the 2015 Academy Awards. Indiewire called the first film "one of the greatest short films in the history of movies," and Rolling Stone ranked World of Tomorrow #10 on its list of the "Greatest Animated Movies Ever." Of the "dreamy, beloved" ongoing series,The Film Stage noted, "Hertzfeldt has crafted what might be the crowning achievement of modern science fiction."

== Development ==
Hertzfeldt had long been interested in science fiction but hesitated to make a film set in the genre partly due to not wanting to be confined by it, noting, "it always seems to mean having to tread at least a little bit through overly familiar waters." Still, aspects of science fiction appeared in his film It's Such a Beautiful Day and his graphic novel The End Of The World. He felt that the science fiction genre would specially make sense for his first foray into digital animation.

The design of the film was influenced by science fiction novels and magazine covers of the 1950s and '60s, and by Hertzfeldt wanting the film to have a storybook aesthetic. He worked on the first film simultaneously with his couch gag guest appearance on The Simpsons. Both projects were the first time he had used digital animation in his work. Hertzfeldt was also responsible for the film's sound design and visual effects.

== Plot ==
=== World of Tomorrow (2015) ===
A young girl, Emily is contacted by a third-generation clone of her future self from 227 years in the future, created as a means of achieving immortality. The clone explains the myriad ways people in her time have sought to escape death and loneliness through technology. They then travel to the clone's time and visit the Outernet, a future version of the Internet, where they explore memories of the clone's life.

The first memory is one from the clone Emily's childhood, where a male clone without a brain, nicknamed "David", is kept in stasis as an art exhibit. Emily, feeling an affinity with the clone, visits him at the exhibit until his death at age 72. Other memories the pair experiences involve Emily's various jobs and love interests, on the Moon and in outer space. Upon her return to Earth, the clone Emily opened an art gallery exhibiting anonymous memories harvested from the dead. Here she meets and falls in love with a fourth-generation descendant clone of David and marries him. He dies a sudden death, and no more clones are produced from his lineage. His death causes her great sadness, and she spends time reviewing the memories she harvested from him.

Finally, clone Emily reveals that in 60 days, Earth will be destroyed by a meteoroid. She had contacted the young Emily Prime to retrieve an important memory she had forgotten before her own impending death: that of the original Emily and her mother walking together. The specific memory will comfort her in the days leading to Earth's destruction. She gives Emily Prime advice she remembers receiving from her own future self, and encourages her to live well, in spite of the long and sad future that awaits her. She then returns Emily Prime home, who promptly goes out to play.

=== Episode Two: The Burden of Other People's Thoughts (2017) ===
Emily Prime is busy drawing when she is interrupted by a time-traveling visitor: the sixth backup copy of the adult third-generation clone who had contacted Emily Prime in the previous episode, known as Emily 6. This backup Emily has some genetic deterioration and was next in line to be a proper clone of Emily, but has decided to replace her mind with a copy of Emily Prime's using a neural network.

The two start to merge their consciousnesses; inside Emily 6's mind, Emily Prime meets a younger version of Emily 6, and they talk about Emily 6's bracelet, a birthday gift from her sister Felicia. Emily Prime is transported back to the adult Emily 6 in a location in the subconsciousness called the "Bog of Realism". In the bog waters, Emily 6 had buried many "glimmers of hope" from her youth that she could not fulfill when she became an adult, one of which was a dream of dancing in The Nutcracker ballet.

The two stumble upon the "Valley of Buried Memories", which contains many memories inherited from other Emily clones. Emily Prime views three memories of her later life where she is unexpectedly visited by Emilys 4, 6, and 7, as they intrusively observe Emily Prime's life via time travel as "tourists", hoping to experience the memories they hold of Emily Prime's life. It was from this excursion that Emily 6 broke away from her companions, visiting young Emily Prime to enact her mind replacement plan.

In Emily 6's memories, Emily Prime spots a stasis tube containing the unconscious body of Felicia floating around a red planet in space. Emily 6 reveals that Felicia is actually Emily 5, having been separated from Emily 6 following Earth's destruction and reprogrammed to store the memories of a deceased wealthy family. They were best friends who did not want to both be named Emily, so they agreed to call Emily 5 "Felicia" and traded their bracelets, revealed to be identification tags, causing the numbers "5" and "6" on their foreheads to be switched. Emily 6 has long searched for Emily 5 but cannot remember the planet she is located at, causing her body and mind to break down from the distress. Emily 6 begins believing Emily Prime to be Felicia and talks about living on the red planet together. They are transported into the delicate "logic center" in Emily 6's brain, and Emily Prime inadvertently causes a system collapse.

The two are safely transported into Emily Prime's mind instead, where Emily 6 begins to disappear, as the neural network finishes its job of replacing Emily 6's mind with a copy of Emily Prime's. To console Emily 6, Emily Prime gives her a ticket to The Nutcracker as a present, and Emily 6 dances to the suite as she contemplates her death. Emily 6 gives Emily Prime her bracelet, telling her to give it to Felicia when they meet again in 230 years, and asks Emily Prime to tell her a story. Emily Prime does so as Emily 6 fades from existence.

Emily Prime then returns to her room, with Emily 6 now having the same mind as Emily Prime's, and gives her bracelet back to her, declaring herself to be her new sister. Suddenly, Emilys 4 and 7 appear, admonishing Emily 6. Emily 6 says goodbye to Emily Prime before being transported away.

=== Episode Three: The Absent Destinations of David Prime (2020) ===
The ninth backup of Emily, Emily 9, time-travels 400 years into the past to visit David Prime as a child, recording and implanting a short transmission and a larger compressed file into his brain that will become activated when he is older. Adult David Prime uncovers the memory, and Emily 9 sends him on a mission to recover his future fourth-generation clone's memories, which his wife, the Emily clone, harvested following his sudden death, as depicted in the first episode. As the only Emily clone backup to have inherited David's memories by way of the Emily clone harvesting them, Emily 9 believes she has uncovered a conspiracy about the fourth-generation David's sudden death. She hopes that if David Prime recovers the memories she's securely hidden, he might be able to take action and alter the timeline of events to allow some version of Emily and David to remain happily together, though she is unsure if time can truly be altered.

David Prime follows Emily's instructions and arrives at a distant planet. The journey to the hidden memory package is arduous, but he reaches the memory file, where Emily explains the full story: Eventually, when cloning technology becomes available, David Prime will clone himself. Each clone also has two subservient backup clones with numerical designations. The third-generation David clone's backup, David 4, will secretly be drafted as a "cleaner", secret agents given technology to stabilize the timeline by eliminating paradoxes, including by assassinating individuals as necessary. However, David 4 becomes obsessed with the third-generation Emily clone upon seeing her fall in love with the fourth-generation David clone. He uses his technology to kill the fourth-generation David clone, as depicted in the first episode, intending to take his place and be with Emily. This plan was uncovered by the third-generation David clone, who is unable to develop the technology necessary to confront and stop David 4. He puts himself in stasis, hoping that technology will advance enough for him to eventually confront David 4 when he emerges. However, he awakens from stasis debilitated and instead creates the David clone art display that entranced the young Emily clone from the first episode, before mysteriously disappearing.

Armed with this knowledge, David Prime locates a robot from the future, called a Zorgbot, that Emily 9 hid on the planet with additional final information, but finds the Zorgbot out of order without any way to repair its futuristic tech. Many years later, once cloning and Zorgbot technology become available, an elderly David Prime is able to retrieve the Zorgbot information and create his second-generation clone, along with its two subservient backups, Davids 2 and 3. The Zorgbot contains a recording from Emily 9 with David 4's last-known coordinates and time travel technology from Emily 9's time. David Prime dies and the three clones work together, developing the time travel tech needed to confront David 4. The second-generation David clone suits up and travels alone to stop David 4.

As David 4 is about to assassinate the fourth-generation David clone standing next to Emily in the first episode, the second-generation David clone arrives and murders him. But he is in turn murdered by the newly arrived David 3, who is himself subsequently murdered by the newly arrived David 2. David 2 assassinates the fourth-generation David, maintaining the timeline of events. He then creates the third-generation David clone with heavily altered memories, using time travel to place the clone in the correct place in time to discover David 4's plans. Using information gleaned from the Zorgbot, David 2 is able to locate Emily 9, appearing behind her just as she finishes her Zorgbot recording to David Prime. Without turning around, she says, "Hello, David."

== Release and reception ==
=== World of Tomorrow ===
World of Tomorrow premiered at the 2015 Sundance Film Festival where it won the Grand Jury Prize for Short Film. World of Tomorrow was released on-demand on Vimeo in March 2015, simultaneously with its continuing theatrical run in film festivals. At the end of its film festival run, the film won over 40 awards. World of Tomorrow won two Crystal Awards from the Annecy Animation Festival: a Special Jury Award and the Audience Award. The film also won two awards from the Ottawa International Animation Festival: Best Script and the Audience Award. It later won the animation industry's Annie Award for Best Animated Short of 2015.

Critical response was universally positive, with Indiewire calling the short film "one of the best films of 2015", The Dissolve naming it "one of the finest achievements in sci-fi in recent memory". World of Tomorrow has an approval rating of 100% on review aggregator website Rotten Tomatoes, based on eight reviews, and an average rating of 9.80/10.

In 2016, Rolling Stone ranked World of Tomorrow tenth on its list of the "Greatest Animated Movies Ever."

In 2016, the film was nominated for an Academy Award for Best Animated Short Film.

In 2019, the film critics of Indiewire ranked the short film seventeenth on its list of the "100 Best Movies of the Decade".

In 2022, Hertzfeldt uploaded the first episode to YouTube. Subsequent episodes are available to stream on Vimeo On-Demand.

=== Episode Two ===
World of Tomorrow Episode Two: The Burden of Other People's Thoughts premiered in 2017 and received rare "A+" reviews from Indiewire and Collider, where it was described as "another soulful sci-fi masterpiece." The Daily Beast called it "a must-see animated masterpiece" and "one of the best films of the year."

An image from World of Tomorrow Episode Two appears in the album artwork of the Arcade Fire record, We.

In 2024, World of Tomorrow Episode Two was ranked #5 on Indiewire's list of the "Best Sequels of the 21st Century".

=== Episode Three ===
World of Tomorrow Episode Three: The Absent Destinations of David Prime was released on-demand worldwide on October 9, 2020. Unlike its predecessors, it was unable to premiere in theaters due to the ongoing COVID-19 pandemic.

It received positive reviews, including another "A+" from Indiewire. Of the "dreamy, beloved" ongoing series, The Film Stage wrote, "Hertzfeldt has crafted what might be the crowning achievement of modern science fiction."

World of Tomorrow Episode Three appeared in theaters for the first time in 2023 as part of a special World of Tomorrow program with the Alamo Drafthouse cinemas, called An Evening with Don Hertzfeldt, Who Will Not Be There.

Film critic David Ehrlich ranked World of Tomorrow Episode Three #3 on his list of the 25 Best Films of 2020.

In 2021, the film was nominated for an Annie Award for Best Animated Short, Hertzfeldt's 4th nomination in the category.

A Blu-ray titled World of Tomorrow: The First Three Episodes was released in 2021, collecting the first three short films plus a booklet of production notes, a deleted scene, and a related new animated short called On Memory.

=== Future ===
A month before Episode Three's release, Hertzfeldt stated on Twitter, in response to a fan question about a possible Blu-ray release, that the series isn't a trilogy, hinting at additional episodes. Hertzfeldt later confirmed plans for future episodes in a post-release interview with Indiewire, stating that he had ideas but didn't know what his plans would be due to the COVID-19 pandemic.

On March 4, 2021, Hertzfeldt gave an update during an interview with Gizmodo, estimating it would be "another couple years" until the release of Episode Four if he didn't reach a deal with a streaming service. A few days later, on March 11, 2021, he told Rolling Stone that it would likely be a long time before Episode Four, if his current progress continued without any additional help, roughly estimating it wouldn't be released within the next ten years.

The bonus booklet included with the Blu-ray release of the first three episodes confirms that World of Tomorrow Episode Three: The Absent Destinations of David Prime is definitively not the end and Hertzfeldt will return to the series at some point, suggesting that it could potentially go all the way up to nine episodes.

In May 2026, Hertzfeldt revealed that he was still looking for “a home” for future episodes after a streaming deal fell through, stating that continuing the series on his own would take too long. In August 2026, Hertzfeldt's complete collection became available to stream on Dropout.

== Accolades ==
The first film won 42 awards, including:

- Grand Jury Prize for Short Film, Sundance Film Festival
- Best Animated Short, SXSW
- Best Animated Short, Annie Awards
- Steven Goldmann Visionary Award, Nashville Film Festival
- Grand Prix, Anifilm Třeboň
- Best Film, Fantoche Animation Festival
- Golden Zagreb for Creativity and Artistic Achievement, Animafest Zagreb
- Best Script, Ottawa Animation Festival
- Audience Award, Ottawa Animation Festival
- Audience Award, Annecy International Animated Film Festival
- Special Jury Distinction, Annecy International Animated Film Festival
- Grand Jury Prize, St. Cloud Film Festival
- Scientific Merit Award, Imagine Science Film Festival
- Best Short Film, Buenos Aires International Festival of Independent Cinema
- Best Animated Short, Dallas International Film Festival
- Best Animated Short, Omaha Film Festival
- Best Animated Short, Sarasota Film Festival
- Audience Award, Vienna Independent Shorts
- Audience Award, Glasgow Short Film Festival
- Audience Award, Independent Film Festival of Boston
- Audience Award, Flatpack Film Festival
- Audience Award, Montreal International Animation Film Festival
- Special Jury Mention, Regard Sur Le Court Film Festival
- Special Jury Mention, Fest Anča International Animation Festival
- Best Animated Film, Alhambra Theatre Film Festival
- Honorary Mention, Prix Ars Electronica
- Jury Prize, Utopiales
- Best Animated Short Subject, Annie Awards
- 88th Academy Awards: Academy Award for Best Animated Short Film (nomination).

In December 2015, Hertzfeldt received a special award from the Austin Film Critics Association, "in celebration of a career of remarkable short filmmaking and contributions to animation spanning two decades, with the 2015 award-winning "World of Tomorrow" being recognized as his best work to date."
