= Don Hertzfeldt =

American animator (born 1976)

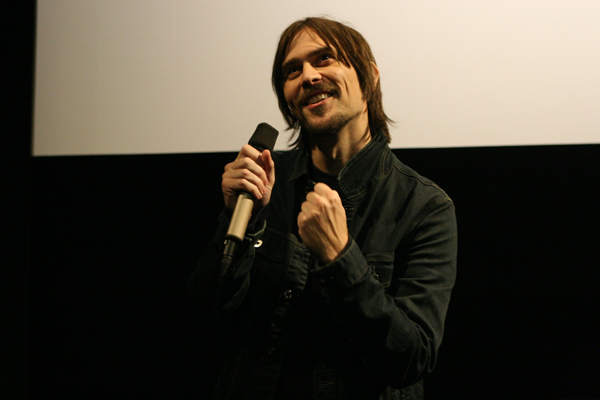
- Hertzfeldt in 2015
- Born: August 1, 1976 (age 50); Fremont, California, U.S.
- Education: University of California, Santa Barbara (B.A. 1998)
- Known for: Independent film, animation
- Website: bitterfilms.com

Don Hertzfeldt (born August 1, 1976) is an American animator, writer, and independent filmmaker. He is a two-time Academy Award nominee who is best known for the animated films It's Such a Beautiful Day, the World of Tomorrow series, Paper Trail, and Rejected. In 2014, his work appeared on The Simpsons. Nine of his short films have competed at the Sundance Film Festival, a festival record. He is also the only filmmaker to have won the Sundance Film Festival's Grand Jury Prize for Short Film twice.

Hertzfeldt's work has been described as "some of the most influential animation ever created", "some of the most vital and expressive animation of the millennium", "some of the most essential short films of the last 20 years", and "films of a sort that never really existed before." In 2020, GQ described his work as "simultaneously tragic and hilarious and philosophical and crude and deeply sad and fatalist and yet stubbornly, resolutely hopeful."

Hertzfeldt's It's Such a Beautiful Day and World of Tomorrow have been regarded by critics as two of the best animated films of all time.

In his book The World History of Animation, author Stephen Cavalier writes "Hertzfeldt is either a unique phenomenon or perhaps an example of a new way forward for individual animators surviving independently on their own terms... he attracts the kind of fanatical support from the student and alternative crowds usually associated with indie rock bands".

Hertzfeldt's latest animated film, Paper Trail, premiered at the 2026 Sundance Film Festival and won the Special Jury Award for Creative Vision. In June, Paper Trail won the Annecy Crystal, the first American film in 22 years to win the Grand Prize at the Annecy International Animation Film Festival.

== Personal life ==
Hertzfeldt was born on August 1, 1976, in Fremont, California, the son of an airline pilot and a county library clerk. Some publications have his place of birth as Fremont while others name Castro Valley, California. He is of half Swedish descent. Hertzfeldt attended Mission San Jose High School in Fremont. In his childhood, Hertzfeldt drew homemade comic books and, at the age of 15, he began to teach himself animation with a VHS video camera. Two of Hertzfeldt's teenage VHS cartoons can be seen on the "Bitter Films: Volume 1" DVD collection.

While at film school, Hertzfeldt was drawn to animating his student films because he could not afford to buy the numerous rolls of 16mm film required to shoot live-action. Because he had no formal training in animation, he has said he thinks of himself more as a "filmmaker who just happens to draw." His earliest teenage video animations found film festival exposure, and in film school at the University of California, Santa Barbara he was able to find international distribution for each of his 16mm student films. He is a 1998 graduate with a B.A. in Film Studies.

Hertzfeldt primarily supports his work through self-distribution such as ticket sales from theatrical tours, DVDs, VOD, and television broadcasts. He has refused all advertising work.

Hertzfeldt's influences include Steven Spielberg, Stanley Kubrick, David Lynch, Edward Gorey, Frank Mouris, Stan Brakhage, Orson Welles, Monty Python, silent films (especially those by Charlie Chaplin and Buster Keaton), the alternative rock bands Radiohead, Nirvana, and R.E.M., Charles Schulz's Peanuts, and the animated shorts he saw at numerous animation festivals at a young age, including the early works of Aardman Animations and Bill Plympton.

In 2022, for the BFI Sight and Sound "Greatest Films of All Time" poll, Hertzfeldt listed the following ten films as important titles that had "knocked me over the head at some point in life and continue to do so": The Act of Killing, Citizen Kane, Close Encounters of the Third Kind, Gates of Heaven, The Godfather, Goodfellas, Harold and Maude, Monty Python's Life of Brian, The Pianist, and 2001: A Space Odyssey.

== Technique ==
Hertzfeldt's work commonly features hand-drawn stick figures, in stories of black humor, surrealism, and tragicomedy. Some films contain existential and philosophical themes while others are more straightforwardly slapstick and absurdist. His animation was first created traditionally, with pen and paper, before transitioning to digital animation for his World of Tomorrow short film series. Hertzfeldt initially used antique 16 mm or 35 mm–film cameras to photograph his drawings and often employs old-fashioned special effect techniques such as multiple exposures, in-camera mattes, and experimental photography. While some of these techniques are as established as an occasional stop-motion animation sequence or a universe of moving stars created by back-lit pin holes, other effects are innovations on classical methods, as seen with the in-camera compositing of multiple, split-screen windows of action in It's Such a Beautiful Day.

Hertzfeldt's student films in the 1990s were photographed on 16mm. From 1999 to 2011, Hertzfeldt photographed his films on a 35mm Richardson animation camera stand, believed to be the same camera that photographed many of the Peanuts cartoons in the 1960s and 1970s. Built in the late 1940s, it was one of the last remaining functioning cameras of its kind left in the world, and Hertzfeldt found it to be a crucial element in the creation of his films and their visuals.

In 2015, Hertzfeldt released his first digitally animated short film, World of Tomorrow, which was created at the same time as another digital piece, an animated guest appearance on The Simpsons. Both pieces were still hand-drawn by Hertzfeldt, but he used a Cintiq tablet instead of paper.

Discussing film and digital technology with The New York Times in 2008, Hertzfeldt noted:

I don't know why these things are always framed as a big dumb cage match: Hand-drawn versus computers, film versus digital. We have over 100 years now of amazing film technology to play with, I don't understand why any artists would want to throw any of their tools out of the box. Many people assume that because I shoot on film and animate on paper I must be doing things the "hard way", when in fact my last four movies would have been visually impossible to produce digitally. The only thing that matters is what actually winds up on the big screen, not how you got it there. You could make a cartoon in crayons about a red square that falls in unrequited love with a blue circle, and there wouldn't be a dry eye in the house if you know how to tell a story.

It's not unusual for Hertzfeldt to write, direct, produce, animate, photograph, edit, perform voices, record and mix sound, and/or compose music for one of his films, at times requiring years to complete a single short by working alone. The animation for one of his films may often require tens of thousands of drawings.

Hertzfeldt frequently scores his pictures with classical music and opera. The music of Tchaikovsky, Bizet, Smetana, Beethoven, Richard Strauss, and Wagner have all appeared in his films. On occasion, Hertzfeldt has also scored portions of his films himself, with a guitar or keyboard.

=== Approach to writing ===
Hertzfeldt described his relaxed writing process in a 2015 Reddit "AMA" session:

It's like you're floating in an ocean, and you want to build a raft. So you just float there and you wait and wait. And eventually this little piece of something comes drifting by, maybe a memory, and you hang on to it, and then another little piece comes around, it is unrelated, maybe it's a funny sentence you overheard somewhere. And you keep collecting all these little things that just sort of drift by... a dream, a beautiful sentence in your head that just appeared while doing the dishes, an anecdote you stole from your old diary... and eventually you find connections between all the things and with all these parts you've gathered up you now have enough stuff to build a raft. And then once you have the raft you can remove all the bits that don't quite fit anymore, the spare parts that you didn't need after all, you toss them back or maybe save them for another raft later. When I write, there isn't a lot of active effort or swimming around, or calculation... for me that can be very poisonous to creativity. The big ideas won't happen right when you mentally stress on them... it's more a matter of being patient and being open to all the things that just drift in.

In another Reddit "AMA", on the subject of creativity, Hertzfeldt suggested the following:

...You need to try to return to the time when you were a little kid, creating things on a big sheet of paper in a beautiful sunbeam, and not having any cares at all about how it might one day be received. It's when children learn to think, "Is this any good?" that they start to become paralyzed creatively. And this is why most adults don't draw, don't write, don't sing, don't dance, and are terrified in front of audiences.

== Student films, 1995–1998 ==
Hertzfeldt made four 16mm animated student films while studying film at the University of California, Santa Barbara.

Ah, L'Amour and Genre were produced at the ages of 18 and 19. Ah, L'Amour won the HBO Comedy Arts Festival Grand Prize for "World's Funniest Cartoon".

His first dialogue short, Lily and Jim, was released in 1997, and tells the story of a disastrous blind date. Its partially improvised vocal performances helped the short win twenty-five awards, including the Grand Prize at the New Orleans Film Festival.

His final student cartoon, Billy's Balloon, is about an inexplicable attack on small children by malevolent balloons. It was nominated for the Short Film Palme d'Or at the 1999 Cannes Film Festival, and won the Grand Jury Award at the 1999 Slamdance Film Festival. In total, it won 33 awards.

The popularity of each student short at film and animation festivals—and eventually around the world from screening on MTV and other networks—helped fund the next one, and eventually financed the production of his first film after college.

== Independent animation, 2000–present ==
=== Rejected ===
Soon after graduating from film school, Hertzfeldt purchased his own 35mm rostrum camera and made his next animated short, Rejected.

Released nationwide in theaters through the Spike and Mike's Festival of Animation in 2000, the short won 27 film festival awards and was nominated for an Oscar for Best Animated Short Film the following year.

Rejected is now considered a cult classic and one of the most influential animated films ever made. In the early 2000s, pirated copies of Rejected turned the film into a viral video, where it has been credited with shaping the surreal sense of humor of the early Internet. In 2018 New York Magazine wrote, "If there is a single piece of media that inspired what we nebulously refer to as "internet humor," it's probably Rejected.

In 2009, Rejected was the only short film named as one of the "Films of the Decade" by Salon. In 2010, it was noted as one of the five "most innovative animated films of the past ten years" by The Huffington Post. Indiewire film critic Eric Kohn named Rejected one of the "10 best films of the 21st century" on his list for the BBC Culture poll in 2016.

The film presents itself as a reel of rejected commercial work by a fictional version of Don Hertzfeldt. The commissioned animated vignettes grow more and more abstract and inappropriate as the animator suffers a mental breakdown until they fall apart.

Although the film is fictional and Hertzfeldt has never done advertising work, he received many offers to do television commercials after Billy's Balloon drew international attention. In appearances, Hertzfeldt has told the humorous story of how he was tempted to produce the worst possible cartoons he could come up with for the companies, run off with their money, and see if they would make it to air. Eventually, this became the germ for Rejected's theme of a collection of cartoons so bad they were rejected by advertising agencies, leading to their creator's breakdown and ultimately the cartoons' metaphysical crisis.

=== The Animation Show ===
In 2003, Hertzfeldt created The Animation Show with Beavis and Butt-head creator Mike Judge. It was a biennial North American touring festival that brought independent animated short films to more movie theaters than any distributor in history. The programs were personally curated by Hertzfeldt and Judge. Highlights of the first theatrical program included a restored excerpt from Ward Kimball's 1957 "Mars and Beyond" through a special partnership with Disney, the stop-motion animated film Vincent by Tim Burton, new cartoons by Hertzfeldt to bookend the program, and never-before-seen pencil tests and animation experiments by Mike Judge.

A second Animation Show edition toured throughout 2005, featuring Hertzfeldt's new short film The Meaning of Life and new work by animators Peter Cornwell and Georges Schwizgebel. The third season of The Animation Show began its nationwide release in January 2007, featuring new work by animators Joanna Quinn and Bill Plympton, as well as Hertzfeldt's Everything Will Be OK.

A stated goal of The Animation Show was to regularly "free the work of these independent artists from the dungeons of Internet exhibition," and bring them into proper movie theaters where most of the short films were originally meant to be seen. The Animation Show meanwhile launched a supplemental DVD series of animated short films, with content that varied from the annual theatrical programs. These DVDs were distributed by MTV.

In a March 2008 entry in his blog, Hertzfeldt announced he had decided to leave The Animation Show, after having programmed three tours. A fourth season of the program was released in theaters in summer 2008, with no involvement from him.

In 2025, Hertzfeldt returned to short film programming with the creation of Animation Mixtape.

=== The Meaning of Life ===
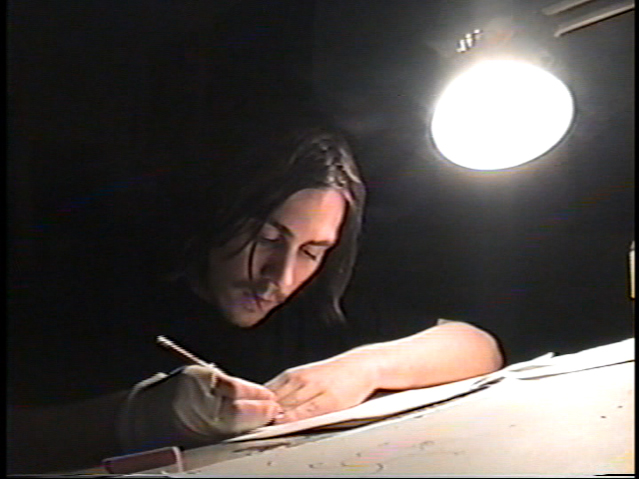
Hertzfeldt at his desk during the production of The Meaning of Life

Almost four years in the making, Hertzfeldt's twelve-minute The Meaning of Life premiered at the 2005 Sundance Film Festival and toured film and animation festivals in 2005–2006. Though its abstract nature puzzled some critics, it received mostly positive reviews. The Atlanta Journal-Constitution called the film "the closest thing on film yet to Kubrick's 2001: A Space Odyssey."

In the film, the evolution of the human race is traced from prehistory (mankind as blob forms), through today (mankind as teeming crowds of selfish, fighting, or lost individuals), to hundreds of millions of years into the future as our species evolves into countless new forms; all of them still behaving the same way. The film concludes in the extreme future, with two creatures (apparently an adult and child subspecies of future humans), having a conversation about the meaning of life on a colorful shore.

In 2009, Hertzfeldt noted, "I don't often make the same sort of movie twice in a row. It's always been whatever's next in my head. From a commercial standpoint I guess I've made some pretty inscrutable decisions, like following up Rejected with a sprawling abstract film about human evolution, but it's really just been whichever ideas won't go away at the time. There's always a lot of new things I'd like to try."

In 2014, Time Out New York named the film one of the "thirty best animated short films ever made."

=== Everything Will Be OK, I Am So Proud Of You and It's Such a Beautiful Day ===
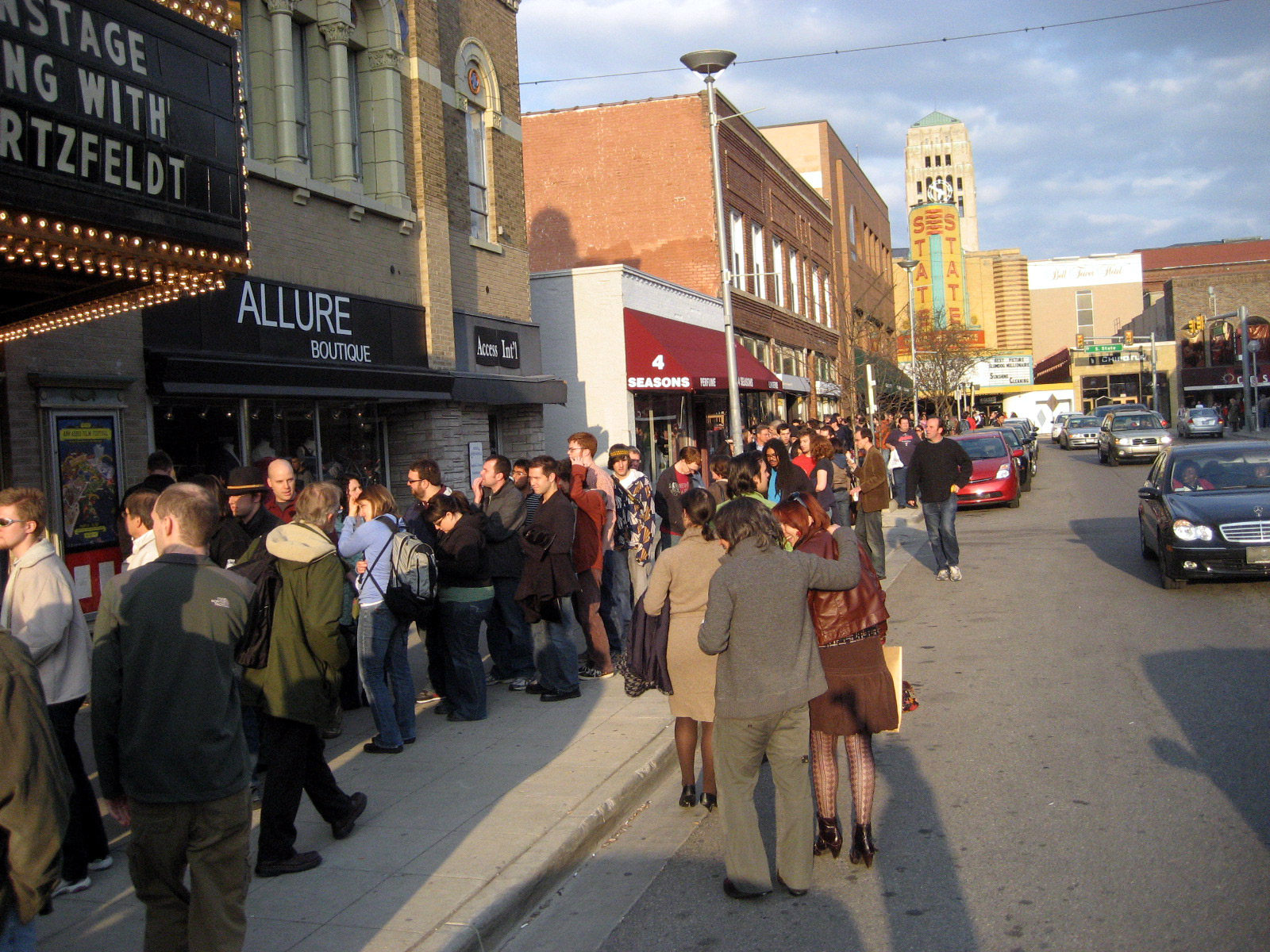
A line around the block for An Evening with Don Hertzfeldt

==== Everything Will Be OK ====
Everything Will Be OK was released in 2006 and became Hertzfeldt's most critically successful piece to date, receiving his strongest reviews. The 17-minute animated short was based on a character, Bill, from his webcomic "Temporary Anesthetics". The Boston Globe called the film a "masterpiece" with the Boston Phoenix declaring Hertzfeldt a "genius." The short film was a cover story on the Chicago Reader, receiving four stars from critic J.R. Jones. Variety film critic Robert Koehler named Everything Will Be OK one of the Best Films of 2007.

Everything will be OK is the first chapter of a three-part story about a man named Bill whose daily routines, perceptions, and dreams are illustrated onscreen through multiple split-screen windows. Bill's seemingly mundane life, narrated in humorous and dramatic anecdotes, gradually grows dark as we learn he may be suffering from a possibly fatal neurological disorder.

Scenes throughout the trilogy are often divided into multiple windows of action on the screen at once against a background of pure black. Animated still photographs are also incorporated inside certain windows, as well as a handful of the colorful special effects and experimental film techniques that Hertzfeldt first utilized in The Meaning of Life. Like many of Hertzfeldt's films, the trilogy's special effects were captured in camera.

Everything Will Be OK won the Grand Jury Prize for Short Filmmaking at the 2007 Sundance Film Festival, the Lawrence Kasdan Award for Best Narrative Film at the Ann Arbor Film Festival, the Grand Prize at the London Animation Festival, and 34 other awards.

==== I Am So Proud of You ====
I Am So Proud of You, the second chapter in the story, was released in autumn 2008. Upon its release, Hertzfeldt traveled with I Am So Proud of You and a selection of his other films to 22 cities on a sold-out American tour (with two stops in the UK and three in Canada). '"An Evening with Don Hertzfeldt" presented a 35mm selection of his work followed by an onstage interview and audience chat with him. I Am So Proud of You also played at film festivals throughout 2009 and won 27 awards.

==== It's Such a Beautiful Day ====
The third and final chapter, It's Such a Beautiful Day, premiered at the 2011 Sundance Film Festival. Hertzfeldt traveled with It's Such a Beautiful Day in 2011 and 2012 on another North American theatrical tour to 30 cities.

Of the trilogy, Steven Pate of The Chicagoist wrote, "There is a moment in each installment of Don Hertzfeldt's masterful trilogy of animated shorts where you feel something in your chest. It's an unmistakably cardiac event, the kind that great art can elicit when something profound and undeniably true is conveyed about the human condition. That's when you say to yourself: are stick figures supposed to make me feel this way? In the hands of a master, yes. And Hertzfeldt is to stick figures what Franz Liszt was to planks of ebony and ivory and what Ted Williams was to a stick of white ash: someone so transcendentally expert that to describe what they do in literal terms is borderline demeaning."

In 2025, Collider named It's Such a Beautiful Day one of the "10 Greatest Short Films Of All Time".

==== It's Such a Beautiful Day, the feature film ====
In 2012, Hertzfeldt edited the three chapters of the short film trilogy together to create a seamless new feature-length version of the story. The feature film shares the same title as the third chapter of the story, It's Such a Beautiful Day, and had a limited theatrical release the same year.

It's Such a Beautiful Day was subsequently released on DVD, iTunes, Netflix, and on-demand on Vimeo. The film was released on Blu-ray in 2015 and in 2021, a remastered version was released on The Criterion Channel.

It's Such a Beautiful Day was very well received by film critics. The Los Angeles Film Critics Association named it their runner-up for Best Animated Feature Film of the year, behind Frankenweenie. Indiewire ranked Hertzfeldt the 9th best Film Director of the Year in its annual poll (tied with Wes Anderson), and The A.V. Club film critics ranked the film # 8 on their list of the Best Films of 2012. Slate Magazine named It's Such a Beautiful Day their pick for Best Animated Feature Film of 2012.

Critic J.R. Jones wrote, "with his humor, darkness, philosophical yearning, and insistence on drawing every line himself, [Hertzfeldt] may be the only legitimate successor to Charles M. Schulz."

After a limited UK release in 2013, the film was ranked #3 on Time Out London's list of the 10 Best Films of 2013 and #4 on The London Film Review's list of the same. In 2014, Time Out New York ranked It's Such a Beautiful Day #16 on its list of the "100 Best Animated Movies Ever Made."

In the years that followed, the film's status grew. In 2014, Time Out New York ranked It's Such a Beautiful Day #16 on its list of the "100 Best Animated Movies Ever Made," and in 2016, The Film Stage critics ranked the film #1 on their list of "The 50 Best Animated Films of the 21st Century Thus Far." In 2019, The Wrap named It's Such a Beautiful Day the #1 "Best Animated Film of the 2010s." The same year, the Vulture film critics ranked it #12 on their overall list of the "Best Movies of the Decade." In 2021, IGN's CineFix gave it the #1 spot on their "Top 10 Animated Films of All Time" list.

In 2024, It's Such a Beautiful Day was rereleased in over 100 theaters, paired with the debut of Hertzfeldt's new animated short film, ME.

=== Wisdom Teeth ===
In October 2009, Hertzfeldt premiered Wisdom Teeth, an unannounced, new five-minute cartoon at the "Evening with Don Hertzfeldt" screening at the Ottawa Animation Festival. It later screened at the Sundance Film Festival in January 2010 and the Fantasia Film Festival in Montreal, where it was awarded a Special Jury Mention. In 2010, it appeared as part of a series on the Showtime Network called "Short Stories".

=== The Simpsons ===
In 2014, Hertzfeldt wrote, animated, and directed a surreal and futuristic two-minute "couch gag" for the premiere episode of the 26th season of Matt Groening's The Simpsons. It was the longest opening gag in the show's history and was described by Spin Magazine as "mind-melting," and "two of the strangest minutes of television ever to air on a major network during prime time."

The sequence depicts Homer accidentally using a time-traveling remote control that regresses him to his original 1987 character model, then propels him into a distant future incarnation of the show called The Sampsans where he and his family have evolved into grotesque, mindless, catchphrase-spouting creatures. Future Homer sadly remembers past futuristic episodes, in which he still had an emotional connection with Marge and the children. Simpsons producer Al Jean called it "crazier than we thought," and "the most insane one we've ever done."

=== World of Tomorrow ===
In January 2015, Hertzfeldt's first digitally-animated short film, World of Tomorrow, premiered at the Sundance Film Festival and won the Grand Jury Prize, his second. Illustrator Julia Pott performs the voice of the short's lead character, opposite Hertzfeldt's then-four-year-old niece, who was recorded while drawing and playing. Her spontaneous, natural vocal reactions and questions were then edited into the story to create her character.

On finally leaping digital animation after twenty years of working with pencil and paper, Hertzfeldt joked, "I kind of feel like it's like a rock band who traditionally was guitar, guitar, guitar and then for their new album, they're like, we're going electronic! But [then] they only use Casio keyboards and drum machines... It's not the cutting edge CG we're all used to."

Critics were universally positive in their reviews, describing the science fiction film as "one of the most satisfying shorts since Chris Marker's landmark 1962 La Jetee and almost certain to be the highlight of this year's Sundance, full stop," "dazzling, enthralling" and "astonishing."

The film next won Best Animated Short at the SXSW Film Festival. Indiewire called the short film "one of the best films of 2015," and The Dissolve named it "one of the finest achievements in sci-fi in recent memory." The A.V. Club described the film as "visionary" and "possibly the best film of 2015," despite its short running time. The Austin Film Critics Association gave Hertzfeldt a Special Honorary Award in recognition of the film.

World of Tomorrow was released on-demand on Vimeo in March 2015, simultaneous with its run in film festivals.

At the end of its film festival run, the film won over 40 awards. World of Tomorrow won two Crystal Awards from the Annecy Animation Festival, a Special Jury Award, and the Audience Award. The film also won two awards from the Ottawa International Animation Festival, Best Script and the Audience Award.

In 2016, World of Tomorrow won the animation industry's Annie Award for Best Animated Short Film.

In 2016, World of Tomorrow was nominated for the Academy Award for Animated Short Film at the 88th Academy Awards, Hertzfeldt's second nomination.

In 2016, Rolling Stone ranked World of Tomorrow #10 on its list of the "Greatest Animated Movies Ever."

In 2019, Indiewire ranked World of Tomorrow #17 in its overall list of the "100 Best Movies of the Decade". In 2020, Indiewire called it "one of the greatest short films in the history of movies."

==== World of Tomorrow Episode Two: The Burden of Other People's Thoughts ====
World of Tomorrow Episode Two premiered in 2017 at Fantastic Fest in Austin and received rare "A+" reviews from Indiewire and Collider, where it was described as "another soulful sci-fi masterpiece." The Daily Beast called it "one of the best films of the year... a must-see animated masterpiece."

Hertzfeldt traveled with the film to theaters on a "winter mini-tour" in December 2017. The screenings opened with a surprise new two-minute cartoon, in which an animated Hertzfeldt introduces the program from the caverns of an alien planet.

World of Tomorrow Episode Two won the Grand Prize at Montreal's Sommets du cinéma d'animation, an Audience Award at Fantastic Fest, and a Special Jury Award from the London Animation Festival.

In January 2018, the film played opening night at the Sundance Film Festival.

In 2024, World of Tomorrow Episode Two was ranked #5 on Indiewire's list of the "Best Sequels of the 21st Century".

==== World of Tomorrow Episode Three: The Absent Destinations of David Prime ====
World of Tomorrow Episode Three: The Absent Destinations of David Prime was released on-demand worldwide on October 9, 2020. Unlike its predecessors, it was unable to premiere in theaters due to the ongoing COVID-19 pandemic.

It received positive reviews, including another "A+" from Indiewire.

Of the "dreamy, beloved" ongoing series, The Film Stage wrote, "Hertzfeldt has crafted what might be the crowning achievement of modern science fiction."

World of Tomorrow Episode Three appeared in theaters for the first time in 2023 as part of a special "World of Tomorrow" program with the Alamo Drafthouse cinemas, called "An Evening with Don Hertzfeldt, Who Will Not Be There".

Film critic David Ehrlich ranked World of Tomorrow Episode Three #3 on his list of the 25 Best Films of 2020.

In 2021, the film was nominated for an Annie Award for Best Animated Short, Hertzfeldt's 4th nomination in the category.

=== ME ===
The 22-minute ME, was released in theaters in the summer of 2024 as part of a double-bill with the theatrical rerelease of his 2012 feature film, It's Such a Beautiful Day. ME debuted on VOD in October 2024.

ME is an abstract, experimental musical described by Hertzfeldt as being about narcissism and pain.

Originally produced as a special music film for a rock band's forthcoming album, ME lost its funding late in production. The finished picture - a musical now without music - reverted back to Hertzfeldt, who recut and rescored it with "new music and new ideas".

Sight and Sound Magazine compared ME to the "broken-puzzle poetry of David Lynch's Mulholland Drive", describing it as a "socio-cosmic satire" about "communication breakdown and its upshots -- solipsism, abandonment, blight, fascism -- set in a contemporary landscape of high tech and low morality... the film is [Hertzfeldt's] most coded, gnomic, and perhaps intuitive; both on the nose and deeply cryptic."

The Film Stage described ME as a "dialogue-free musical that pushes the animation extraordinaire's inventiveness to new heights. Starting as a small-scale family drama before reaching perhaps the widest scope of his work yet, it's a rhythmically captivating odyssey into the fabric of humanity."

Indiewire called ME a "brilliant apocalyptic musical about narcissism," noting it "seems to explode from a cosmic collision between nothing and everything all at once... these films keep stretching toward the stars as they probe deeper into the pit of our souls."

Polygon named it one of the best animated films of the year, calling it "the type of movie that sticks with you long after it's finished, the type that makes you look at yourself, the people around you, and the world differently for having watched it."

Cambridge Day called Hertzfeldt "perhaps our most beloved and influential living animator not named Hayao."

In 2025, ME advanced to the "shortlist", the final round of voting for the Academy Award for Best Animated Short Film at the 97th Academy Awards, but did not make the ultimate list of five nominees.

=== Animation Mixtape ===
In 2025, Hertzfeldt created and curated Animation Mixtape, a new anthology of international animated short films. Unlike past animation festivals, Mixtape is designed to only screen in theaters, with all of the net box office earnings paid to the animators in the program. The program featured a dozen animated films, including Martyr's Guidebook, Zoon, The Flying Sailor, Wednesday with Goddard, restorations of classic films The Big Snit and Hill Farm, as well as never before seen hand-drawn animation from animator Bruce Bickford. Hertzfeldt contributed a three-minute cartoon intro as well as an outro, resurrecting the "Fluffy Guy" characters from Rejected and The Animation Show.

=== Paper Trail ===
Hertzfeldt's latest film Paper Trail premiered at the 2026 Sundance Film Festival and was awarded the Special Jury Prize for Creative Vision. The jury described the film as "a meticulous and brilliantly crafted example of how a single idea, which unfolds with vision and ingenuity, can expand our way of seeing the world... a roving journey of one man's life, twisting and turning along the way with moments that are at once playful, banal, sincere, and, in the end, deeply moving."

In 2026, Paper Trail won the Annecy Crystal, the first time an American film won the grand prize at the Annecy International Animation Film Festival in 22 years.

Paper Trail also won an award for "Visual Poetry" from the Hiroshima International Animation Festival, the Audience Award and Best Animated Short Film at SXSW, and the Golden Gate Award from the San Francisco International Film Festival. The San Francisco jury called Paper Trail "one of those rare short films that comes around only every so often, and one that will likely go on to be referenced as a tentpole of animated storytelling... [it] may well be Hertzfeldt's masterstroke."

The film's other awards include the Grand Prize from the Animation is Film Festival, Best Short Film from the Stockholm International Film Festival, and a Special Jury Award for Experimental Storytelling from the Seattle International Film Festival. The film's composer Naomi Alligator won a special award for Best Original Score from the ANIMATOR International Animation Festival in Poland.

In its review, Cineuropa called Paper Trail "one of the most poignant milestones in animation history."

== Other work ==
In December 2013, Hertzfeldt released a graphic novel, The End of the World, through independent publisher Antibookclub. The 216-page book was described in his blog as containing many years of leftover film ideas reshaped into an experimental new story: "If the films were albums, I guess these would be the B-sides." In 2019, Random House announced they would be printing a new edition of The End of the World in wide release.

In 2013, Hertzfeldt created a 30-second piece called Day Sleeper on an iPad for the National Film Board of Canada. It was animated using their app, a tribute to experimental animator Norman McLaren.

In 2021, Hertzfeldt animated and directed On Memory, a non-fiction special feature included on the World of Tomorrow: The First Three Episodes Blu-ray.

Hertzfeldt created the animated logo for Jennifer Lawrence's production company, Excellent Cadaver. The logo debuted with the release of Causeway in 2022.

In 2024, it was announced that Hertzfeldt is collaborating with Ari Aster on an animated feature film called Antarctica.

== Influence ==
Hertzfeldt's work has been credited with being a prominent influence on surrealism and absurdism in animation in the 2000s, including shaping Adult Swim's brand of animated comedy.

In 2008, Comedy Central noted his work as having "influenced an entire generation of filmmakers."

In 2012, Hertzfeldt was ranked #16 in an animation industry and historian survey of the "Top 100 Most Influential People in Animation."

An animated science fiction story in the third season of Fargo was an homage to Hertzfeldt's work.

In 2018, Raphael Bob-Waksberg cited Hertzfeldt as an influence in the creation of the animated series BoJack Horseman. That same year, Adventure Time showrunner Adam Muto revealed that he and Hertzfeldt were in talks for Hertzfeldt to direct an episode - similar to Masaaki Yuasa's guest-directed Food Chain episode - before the show's finale.

In 2021, Pete Docter acknowledged Hertzfeldt's visual influence on the Pixar film Soul.

In 2025, Clint Bentley cited It's Such a Beautiful Day as one of the influences behind his film, Train Dreams.

Hertzfeldt influenced many webcomics including Hyperbole and a Half, xkcd, and Cyanide & Happiness.

== Awards and honors ==
Hertzfeldt has had more films play in competition at the Sundance Film Festival than any other filmmaker, with nine: Rejected, The Meaning of Life, Everything Will Be OK, I Am So Proud of You, Wisdom Teeth, It's Such a Beautiful Day, World of Tomorrow, World of Tomorrow Episode Two, and Paper Trail. He returned to the Sundance Film Festival in 2013 to serve on the Short Film Jury.

In 1999, at the age of 22, Hertzfeldt was nominated for the Short Film Palme d'Or at the Cannes Film Festival for Billy's Balloon, where he was the youngest director in competition. The same year Billy's Balloon won the Slamdance Film Festival Grand Jury Award.

In 2000, at the age of 23, Hertzfeldt was nominated for the Academy Award for Best Animated Short Film for his fifth short film, Rejected. He lost to Michaël Dudok de Wit for Father and Daughter.

In 2001, Hertzfeldt was named by Filmmaker Magazine as one of the "Top 25 Filmmakers to Watch."

In 2002, Hertzfeldt joined the Academy of Motion Picture Arts and Sciences.

In 2007, Everything Will Be OK won the Grand Jury Award for Short Film at the Sundance Film Festival, a prize rarely given to an animated film.

In 2007, Everything Will Be OK advanced to the "shortlist", the final round of voting as a contender for an Academy Award nomination for Best Animated Short Film, but did not make the ultimate list of five nominees.

In 2007, Hertzfeldt accepted an invitation from the George Eastman House's motion picture archives to indefinitely store and preserve the original film elements and camera negatives of his collected work.

In 2009, Rejected was the only short film named one of the "Films of the Decade" by Salon.com. In 2010, it was noted as one of the five "most innovative animated films of the past ten years" by The Huffington Post.

In 2010, at the age of 33, Hertzfeldt received the San Francisco International Film Festival's "Persistence of Vision" Lifetime Achievement Award "for his unique contributions to film and animation," and "for challenging the boundaries of his craft."

Hertzfeldt was the youngest director named in the They Shoot Pictures, Don't They list of "The 100 Important Animation Directors" of all time.

In 2012, Hertzfeldt received the Ted M. Larson Award from the Fargo Film Festival, for his "contributions to film culture."

In 2015, Hertzfeldt won the Grand Jury Award for Short Film a second time at the Sundance Film Festival, for World of Tomorrow.

In December 2015, Hertzfeldt received a special award from the Austin Film Critics Association, "in celebration of a career of remarkable short filmmaking and contributions to animation spanning two decades, with 2015's award-winning World of Tomorrow being recognized as his best work to date."

Hertzfeldt has been nominated for four Annie Awards for Best Animated Short Film. He lost for Rejected in 2001 and Everything Will Be OK in 2007 and won for World of Tomorrow in 2016. World of Tomorrow Episode Three: The Absent Destinations of David Prime was nominated in 2021 and lost.

In 2016, World of Tomorrow was nominated for the Academy Award for Best Animated Short Film at the 88th Academy Awards, Hertzfeldt's second nomination. He lost to Bear Story.

In 2025, ME advanced to the "shortlist", the final round of voting for the Academy Award for Best Animated Short Film at the 97th Academy Awards, but did not make the ultimate list of five nominees.

In the summer of 2026, Paper Trail won the Grand Prize Annecy Crystal at the Annecy International Animation Film Festival and Hertzfeldt received a Lifetime Achievement Award at the Fantasia International Film Festival.

== DVD, Blu-ray and streaming releases ==
Hertzfeldt owns the rights to all of his work and has self-distributed his films under the moniker "Bitter Films" since the 1990s.

Bitter Films' first DVD release was a 2001 limited edition DVD "single" of the short Rejected. The DVD included a deleted scene, audio commentary, and a few hidden pages. It is now out of print.

Don Hertzfeldt Volume One: 1995–2005 was released in 2006, collecting the first 10 years of his work. All of the short films were remastered and restored in high definition from their original film negatives. The DVD was made available only to fans via the Bitter Films website, with the first 750 pre-orderers receiving an "exclusive mystery gift" (either a 35mm clipping from Rejected that was autographed by Don, or a unique drawing by Don on a Post-it note).

This DVD marked the first time his student films such as Genre and Lily and Jim were made widely available to the public. Many of these works were only previously found on limited-release VHS collections of animated shorts, long out of print.

The special features for Don Hertzfeldt Volume One: 1995–2005 included a time-lapse documentary of the making of The Meaning of Life called "Watching Grass Grow", The Animation Show Trilogy cartoons, Lily and Jim deleted dialogues and outtakes, Rejected trivia captions, The Meaning of Life special effects audio commentary, an over 140-page "archive" section (of rare footage from Hertzfeldt's earliest cartoons, original pencil tests, deleted sequences, abandoned footage, and sketch to scene comparisons), Lily and Jim audio commentary, Rejected audio commentary, and a retrospective booklet, with liner notes by Hertzfeldt.

In 2007, Everything Will Be OK was released as another DVD "single". Special features on this release included over a hundred pages of "archival" material (sketches, storyboards, deleted materials), and a hidden feature that played a narration-free version of the film. Fans who pre-ordered the DVD received a unique 35mm film strip clipped from one of the film's theatrical prints.

I Am So Proud of You was released as a similar "single" in 2009. It featured a similar 148-page "archive" of production materials, as well as a hidden narration-free feature. Fans who pre-ordered the DVD received a unique 35mm film strip clipped from one of the film's theatrical prints.

Don Hertzfeldt Volume 2: 2006–2011, a DVD collection of all work from 2006–2011 (including the feature film version of It's Such a Beautiful Day) was released in November 2012. Special features for the release included over 40 minutes of live Q&A material from the touring program, the cartoon Wisdom Teeth, a deleted scene from It's Such a Beautiful Day, and a 24-page booklet. Fans who pre-ordered the release also received a unique 35mm film strip clipped from a theatrical print of It's Such a Beautiful Day, and other free gifts.

In 2015, Hertzfeldt ran a Kickstarter campaign to fund future productions, with the Blu-ray debut of It's Such a Beautiful Day and World of Tomorrow as the central pledge reward. The campaign raised over $215,000. With rising pledges he restored and remastered additional short films The Meaning of Life, Rejected, Wisdom Teeth, and student films Billy's Balloon and Lily and Jim, adding them to the Blu-ray as well. Also included on the disc was an interview, his piece from The Simpsons, and the first preview of World of Tomorrow Episode Two.

In 2021, a second fundraiser campaign raised over $450,000 for future productions. The main pledge reward was the Blu-ray release of World of Tomorrow: The First Three Episodes, a collection of the first three World of Tomorrow short films plus a booklet of production notes, a deleted scene, and a related new animated short called On Memory. Other rewards included signed prints, original production artwork from It's Such a Beautiful Day, World of Tomorrow jigsaw puzzles, and original drawings.

Since the 1990s, Hertzfeldt has annually auctioned off rare animation artwork and original film props to raise money for local charities. Other artwork has been occasionally given away through the Bitter Films online store through special promotions. Because Hertzfeldt does not often do signings, his animation artwork is rare for collectors and fans to own. The 2023 charity auction marked the first time original animation drawings from It's Such a Beautiful Day had ever been made available.

On August 4, 2026, twelve of his films became available to stream on the comedy platform Dropout.

A Blu-ray containing ME and Paper Trail became available to pre-order on the Bitter Films website on October 10, 2026.

== View on advertising ==
Hertzfeldt has been offered numerous lucrative advertising deals, including ad campaigns for Cingular Wireless and United Airlines, which he has declined. He has made various comments over the years about his dislike of corporate America and says he will never be involved with the advertising world. He has said, "The goal isn't to try and make as much money as I possibly can, the goal is to try and make good movies."

In a 2015 Vanity Fair interview, Hertzfeldt said:

...Many people in our industry would see advertising work as the ultimate goal, which really illustrates the sad state of affairs that's set up for many young animators. They're basically being taught that their [own] work has no value. Their personal projects, even when Oscar-nominated and whatnot, are perceived as just a way to attract some empty corporate advertising gig where they can maybe make enough money to fund another personal project that's maybe dropped on YouTube, loses money, and forgotten about. It's a terrible cycle. Artists shouldn't be making art on the side, it should be their job. We need to retrain audiences who've grown used to the free YouTube model that [short films] are worth paying for.

In a March 2009 blog entry, Hertzfeldt compared filmmaking to his love of hiking and exploring new places: something he does just because he "enjoys doing it and will probably always enjoy doing it." He compared doing advertising to being paid to not go explore the woods, but to walk around someone's house eight hours a day wearing a sandwich board with a picture of a product on it. "Money's not the reason I take walks. It doesn't really factor into it. I take walks because I enjoy doing it. It's something I'd do if I was rich, and it's something I'd do if I were poor."

Nevertheless, several international ad campaigns have borrowed heavily from his unique style and bear enough resemblance to Hertzfeldt's work as to be mistaken for it. The most well-known instance of this is a series of television ads for Kellogg's Pop-Tarts, which use black and white stick figures, "squiggly" animation, surreal humor, and even an occasional crumpling paper effect, all very similar to Hertzfeldt's style. Despite all these similarities, Hertzfeldt was not involved in any way.

== Filmography ==
Feature Films

- It's Such a Beautiful Day (2012)
- Antarctica (TBA)

Short Films

- Rejected (2000)
- The Meaning of Life (2005)
- Everything Will Be OK (2006)
- I Am So Proud of You (2008)
- Wisdom Teeth (2010)
- It's Such a Beautiful Day (2011)
- World of Tomorrow (2015)
- World of Tomorrow Episode Two: The Burden of Other People's Thoughts (2017)
- World of Tomorrow Episode Three: The Absent Destinations of David Prime (2020)
- On Memory (2021)
- ME (2024)
- Paper Trail (2026)

Student Films

- Ah, L'Amour (1995)
- Genre (1996)
- Lily and Jim (1997)
- Billy's Balloon (1998)

Miscellaneous

- Welcome to the Show/Intermission in the Third Dimension/The End of the Show (2003) (cartoons created to book-end the first "Animation Show" program)
- Day Sleeper (2013) (created for the National Film Board of Canada)
- The Simpsons (2014) (episode "Clown in the Dumps" two minute couch gag)
- Intro (2017) (cartoon created to introduce a Hertzfeldt theatrical program)
- Excellent Cadaver (2019) (logo created for Jennifer Lawrence)
- Animation Mixtape Intro (2025)
