= Billy's Balloon =

1998 film by Don Hertzfeldt

- Directed by: Don Hertzfeldt
- Written by: Don Hertzfeldt
- Produced by: Don Hertzfeldt
- Cinematography: Rebecca Moline
- Edited by: Rebecca Moline
- Production company: Bitter Films
- Release date: October 1998
- Running time: 6 minutes
- Country: United States

Billy's Balloon is a 16 mm animated short by Don Hertzfeldt. It was his fourth and final student film at UC Santa Barbara. Similar to his other cartoons, he uses a minimalist stick-figure technique.

The film was invited into Official Competition at the 1999 Cannes Film Festival (where Hertzfeldt was the youngest director involved), and it won the Grand Jury Award at the 1999 Slamdance Film Festival.

On top of its film festival runs (and subsequent popularity online), the short has also appeared on Adult Swim and MTV in the US and on a number of international TV broadcasts around the world. Hertzfeldt has noted that the short's international popularity is likely because it has no dialogue and plays like a silent film.

== Plot ==
A stick figure toddler (presumably named Billy) sits happily with a balloon and rattle until he is unexpectedly hit on the head by the balloon. The balloon gradually escalates its attack into a pummelling. When an adult passes by, the balloon acts innocent until they pass out of sight. Billy is then slowly lifted into the air and dropped multiple times until the balloon stops in the clouds and Billy sees another child held up by a different balloon. They wave to one another and the other child is struck by a plane. A short sequence shows a girl being attacked by several balloons. Two short sequences follow of multiple children being terrorised by balloons. No explanation is given of how or why the balloons are mistreating children. The story is considered a parody of French film director Albert Lamorisse's 1956 short film Le ballon rouge.

There have been many interpretations on what themes the short represents, but Hertzfeldt intentionally avoids talking about them so as to not invalidate the personal experiences the audience has with the film.

== Home media ==
Billy's Balloon was featured on the DVD "Don Hertzfeldt Volume 1", a compilation of Hertzfeldt's short films from 1995 to 2005. Special features included original pencil tests, production sketches, notes, and deleted ideas from the film. In 2015, Billy's Balloon was remastered again for inclusion on the It's Such a Beautiful Day Blu-ray.
