= Genre (1996 film) =

- The nameless Rabbit from the Film.
- Directed by: Don Hertzfeldt
- Written by: Don Hertzfeldt
- Produced by: Don Hertzfeldt
- Cinematography: Cary Walker
- Edited by: Kevyn Eiselt
- Music by: Dave LaDelfa
- Release date: 1996
- Running time: 4:58

Genre is a 1996 animated meta-comedy short film by animator Don Hertzfeldt, his second 16mm student film, produced at the age of 19.

The 16mm short combines traditional animation, pixilation, and stop-motion animation to present a cartoon rabbit careening through a variety of rapidly changing film genres as his animator struggles to come up with a good idea.

== Release ==
The cartoon received 17 awards from film festivals. In 1996 it screened nationwide in theaters as part of the Spike and Mike's Festival of Animation tour.

In 1997, it was shown on an episode of MTV's Cartoon Sushi.

In 2005, the original 16mm negative was digitally restored and remastered for the first time, for release on the extensive "Bitter Films Volume 1" DVD compilation of Hertzfeldt's 1995-2005 films. Special features included for Genre were Hertzfeldt's original production sketches, notes, and deleted ideas from the film, as well as a very rare 1993 video short called "Escape is Still Impossible", a precursor to Genre that Don created while still in high school.

== Production credits ==
- Written, Produced, Animated, and Directed by Don Hertzfeldt
- Camera by Cary Walker
- Editing and Sound by Kevyn Eiselt
- Music by Dave LaDelfa
- Stop Motion Assistance by Brian Hamblin
- Sound Production by Kevin Kelly

== Reception ==
The film was very well received. It was praised by critics such as Felix Hude of the Melbourne International Film Festival and won 17 awards.

=== Awards ===
- Best Short Film - UCSB Corwin-Metropolitan Theaters Award
- First Place, Animation - UFVA Student Film Festival
- The Lumiere Award - New Orleans Film Festival
- First Place, Animated Short Subject New York Empire State Exhibitions
- Most Promising Filmmaker - Sinking Creek Film Festival
- Silver Plaque, Animation - Chicago International Film Festival
- Second Place, Animation - Fort Lauderdale International Film Festival
- Best Santa Barbara Filmmaker - Santa Barbara International Film Festival
- Gold Medal, Best Animation - Carolina Film Festival
- Audience Choice Award, Best Animated Short - Filmfest New Haven
- Jury Award for Humor - Ann Arbor Film Festival
- Jury Award - Surprise International Film Festival, Taiwan
- Second Place, Student Animation - World Animation Celebration
- Bronze Plaque - Columbus International Film Festival
- Finalist Award - Worldfest Houston
- Honorable Mention - Humboldt State Film Festival
- Honorable Mention - Atlanta Film Festival
