= Lily and Jim =

- Directed by: Don Hertzfeldt
- Written by: Don Hertzfeldt
- Produced by: Don Hertzfeldt
- Cinematography: Aimée R. Haeussler
- Edited by: Brian Hamblin
- Release date: 1997
- Running time: 13 minutes

Lily and Jim (1997) is a 16mm animated short film by Don Hertzfeldt. It is Hertzfeldt's third student film from UC Santa Barbara, for which he single-handedly animated over 10,000 drawings. In the film, an awkward blind date between a hopeless couple goes from very bad to much worse. Voice actors Robert May (Jim) and Karin Anger (Lily) improvised a number of their dialogues. The films closing credits feature instrumental piano music called "Moving Thirds" by singer-songwriter Beth Waters.

The film eventually received 25 film festival awards, including Grand Prizes from the New Orleans Film Festival and the USA Film Festival.

In 1998, it was shown on an episode of MTV's Cartoon Sushi.

== Summary ==
Lily and Jim meet each other on a blind date. As the story progresses, they each address the camera directly with their own opinions about the date in black-and-white cutaways. They decide to go to an undistinguished restaurant, but find it very hard to relate to each other, or even strike up a simple conversation. They appear to have little in common, and are both awkward and nervous throughout the evening. After dinner, they spend another uneasy moment under a streetlamp, before deciding to go back to Lily's apartment to share coffee. Jim explains to the audience that he is extremely allergic to coffee, but decides not to tell Lily since he does not want to interrupt the date. Finding nothing to do at the apartment, and missing their chance at a kiss, Lily and Jim decide to watch television, but the TV only shows various surreal images, so they turn it off. Eventually, Jim starts showing physical signs of his allergy, but he denies that anything is wrong, and accepts more coffee. Lily explains in a cutaway that Jim had to be rushed to the hospital, where they exchange phone numbers. Both explain in respective cutaways that they are interested in hearing from the other again, but feel like the other is not interested in them, and so they won't be reaching out.

== On DVD ==
In 2005, Lily and Jim was included in "Bitter Films Volume 1" DVD compilation of Hertzfeldt's 1995-2005 films. Special features created for Lily and Jim include Hertzfeldt's original production sketches and notes, as well as a 15-minute animatic consisting of humorous audio outtakes and unused improvisational dialogue from the original 1996-97 session tapes. The original voice actors were also reunited after nine years to do a retrospective audio commentary.
