= Animation Block Party =

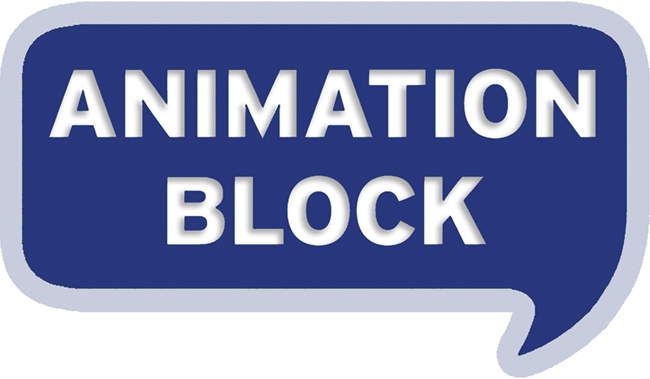
- Location: New York, NY
- Founded: 2004
- No. of films: 100+
- Language: International
- Website: AnimationBlock.com

Animation Block Party is an annual animation film festival in New York City, usually held over three days in late July.

== History ==
=== Brooklyn ===
On September 9, 2004, Casey Safron, the event's founder, curated the first Animation Block Party, held in Williamsburg, Brooklyn. The event was rated one of the top five smaller film festivals in the area. The following year, Animation Block Party opened for international submissions, acquired corporate sponsorship and expanded to become an annual festival with juried awards and prizes for participating animators. In 2006, the festival expanded to its current multi-day format, drawing an average of over 2,500 attendees per summer. Based in Brooklyn, the event shows animation from both U.S. and international filmmakers. In 2011, Animation Block Party received 654 submissions, screening 97 of them at their 8th annual festival.

Animation Block Party expanded to a four-day festival in 2013, including an opening night concert with performances by Adam Green, Hooray for Earth, Tim Harrington, and others, and exclusive animation from Cartoon Network, Nickelodeon and Pixar.

=== Around the US ===
Animation Block Party has held traveling shows in Philadelphia, Austin, Omaha, Boston and Los Angeles, including a 2014 Valentine's Day showcase at The Troubadour in West Hollywood, which included original shorts from MTV Other, Nickelodeon, Six Point Harness, Loopdeloop and Bill Plympton.

== Production ==
Animation Block Party also has a production division called Animation Block, which has turned several pieces from the festival into series. In 2008, Animation Block produced the series "Perfectland" for MTV, which premiered on April 22, 2008. In 2009, Animation Block produced the series "Breakfast" for the Sundance Channel, as well as a 28 episode web series for My Damn Channel.
