= It's Such a Beautiful Day (film) =

2012 film by Don Hertzfeldt

- Theatrical release poster
- Directed by: Don Hertzfeldt
- Written by: Don Hertzfeldt
- Produced by: Don Hertzfeldt
- Narrated by: Don Hertzfeldt
- Cinematography: Don Hertzfeldt
- Edited by: Brian Hamblin
- Production company: Bitter Films
- Release date: 2012
- Running time: 62 minutes
- Country: United States
- Language: English

It's Such a Beautiful Day (stylized in lowercase as it's such a beautiful day) is a 2012 American adult animated tragicomedy film written, directed, animated, photographed, produced, and narrated by Don Hertzfeldt. It follows the daily life of a man named Bill as he tries to manage the various symptoms of an unknown terminal illness.

The experimental film employs surreal humour and philosophical musings. It mostly consists of stick figures with stylized real-life footage sometimes appearing in split-screen windows that are photographed through multiple exposures. The film is divided into three chapters, all of which were originally released in theaters as animated short films: Everything Will Be OK (2006), I Am So Proud of You (2008), and It's Such a Beautiful Day (2011). The three short films collectively received over 90 film festival awards upon their original releases, including the Sundance Film Festival's Grand Prize for Everything Will Be OK. In 2012, the three chapters were combined and released as a new feature film.

It's Such a Beautiful Day received critical acclaim, with its experimental storytelling and surrealist elements being singled out for praise. Many listed it as one of the best films of 2012, and it has come to be regarded as one of the greatest animated films of all time.

== Plot ==
Bill is a man whose daily routines, perceptions, and dreams are illustrated through multiple split-screen windows that are narrated by an uncredited Don Hertzfeldt. He often has meetings with his ex-girlfriend, but suffers from an unnamed illness which interferes with his seemingly mundane and uneventful life. One day, he visits his doctor, who informs him that his illness is getting worse; as the days pass, Bill's hallucinations and thoughts worsen until he has a hallucinogenic mental breakdown and passes out in an alley.

To help him recuperate, Bill's mother comes to take care of him, but Bill mistakenly believes she is about to kill him and attacks her. He is then taken to a hospital but his health fluctuates rapidly and confuses his doctor, who concludes that Bill will not die, which surprises and inconveniences his relatives. He returns to work the following day.

In a flashback to Bill's childhood, the narrator explains the death of Bill's half-brother Randall, who ran into the sea while chasing a bird. After Randall's death, Bill's mother became fiercely protective of Bill, rarely left home, and showed signs of mental illness, eventually causing his stepfather to leave. The narrator details the surreal history of Bill's family, many of whom suffered from mental illness and died in unpleasant, surreal ways.

A few days after leaving the hospital, Bill receives a call telling him that his mother died in a "fit of senile hysterics". After the funeral, Bill finds a notebook where his mother practiced writing love notes to send to him when he was young. Bill again visits his doctor, who says Bill appears to be making a full recovery. However, on his way to lunch, Bill suffers a seizure and collapses. During the seizure, various memories of his infancy and childhood flash before him.

Bill is admitted to the hospital, where his ex-girlfriend frequently visits him. His new doctor administers tests, revealing that Bill appears to be suffering from memory loss and aphasia. During a brain exam, Bill is asked various questions and shown photographs that appear irregular or nonsensical to him. His doctor explains that Bill is having trouble understanding the difference between past and present tense, and it is implied that many of his childhood memories and family history could have been confabulated.

Bill is allowed to go home for family care, but he arrives home to find no one there. He starts to repeat and then forget various tasks, such as buying food and going for walks, and he does not seem to understand that he is ill. His doctor eventually explains that he does not have long to live. Bill's outlook undergoes a stark change, such as noticing more of life's small details. This change is complemented by the film's animation style, with full-color photography of real-life images being merged into the animated scenery.

Bill rents a car and starts driving to nowhere in particular, only to find that his instinct takes him to his childhood home. His uncle gives him the location of a nursing home where Bill can find his biological father, whom he has not seen since childhood. After spending time with his father, Bill forgives him and leaves to continue driving. Feeling his health failing further, Bill stops to lay down under a tree, and the film cuts to black.

Rejecting the reality that Bill will almost certainly die under the tree, the narrator instead describes a different outcome: Bill becomes immortal, accomplishes many wonderful achievements, and outlives humankind and all future inhabitants of Earth. He survives until the death of the universe, looking up at the stars as they disappear one by one.

== Production ==
Six years in the making, the completed film was captured entirely in-camera on a 35 mm rostrum animation stand. Built in the 1940s and used by Hertzfeldt on every project since 1999, it was one of the last surviving cameras of its kind. The film blended traditional hand-drawn animation, experimental optical effects, trick photography, and digital hybrids that were printed for photography one frame at a time.

The film's signature split-screen effect was achieved by framing the drawn animation through tiny holes placed beneath the camera lens during photography, with each element in the film frame individually composited through careful multiple exposures. Towards the end of production of the final chapter, the old camera's motor began to fail and it could no longer advance the film properly, riddling the final footage with unintentional light leaks.

== Release ==
The three chapters of the film were originally produced and released theatrically as three animated short films.

The first installment, Everything Will Be OK, was released in 2006 and won the 2007 Sundance Film Festival Grand Prize for Short Film. Despite the film's short running length, Variety film critic Robert Koehler named Everything Will Be OK one of the "Best Films of 2007". The film was extremely well received by critics, describing it as "essential viewing" and "simply one of the finest shorts produced over the past few years, be it animated or not". The Boston Globe called the film a "masterpiece" with the Boston Phoenix declaring Hertzfeldt a genius. The short film was a cover story on the Chicago Reader, receiving four stars from critic J.R. Jones.

Everything Will Be OK advanced to the final round of voting for Best Animated Short Film at the 2007 Academy Awards, but did not make the final list of five nominees.

Outside of theaters, Everything Will Be OK was first released as a limited edition DVD "single" in 2007. The DVD featured an extensive "archive" of over 100 pages of deleted scenes, Hertzfeldt's production notes, sketches, and layouts, as well as a hidden Easter egg that plays an alternate, narration-free version of the film to highlight the sound design.

The second installment, I Am So Proud of You, was released theatrically in 2008. It continued the dark and philosophical humor of the first film, seeing Bill's recovery haunted by the apparently genetic inevitability of his mental illness, the lack of control over his own fate, and the sudden death of a loved one. The short suggests "simultaneous" connections throughout time, through his strange family history, his childhood, the present, and his old age.

For the first time, Hertzfeldt embarked on a solo tour with the film, presenting a special "Evening with Don Hertzfeldt" program in multiple cities.

I Am So Proud of You received similar critical praise and received 27 film festival awards, including the Grand Jury Prize at the Florida Film Festival and the Golden Starfish at the Hamptons Film Festival.

Director David Lowery wrote that the film is "as good a pick as any for film of the year... full of grand and complex thoughts about life and death and bodily fluids and years rapidly advancing, coming to ends and beginnings, back and forth, over and over, until one slips indistinguishably into the next". Chris Robinson, author and director of the Ottawa International Animation Festival, described I Am So Proud of You as a masterpiece.

Following its theatrical release, a DVD "single" of I Am So Proud of You was released in August 2009, featuring another extensive "archive" of production materials.

The final chapter of the trilogy, It's Such a Beautiful Day, was released in 2011, winning several awards, including a Special Jury Prize from the Hiroshima Animation Festival. In 2011 and 2012, Hertzfeldt again toured the United States and Canada to support the final chapter in another "Evening with Don Hertzfeldt" program. While this theatrical program presented all three of the short films together for the first time, it still presented them as individual shorts, not yet as a unified feature film.

The final, unified feature film version, It's Such a Beautiful Day, shared the same title as the third short film and had a limited theatrical release in 2012. It was nominated for Best Animated Feature Film by the Los Angeles Film Critics Association. It subsequently became available on DVD, Vimeo On-Demand, iTunes, and streamed for a two-year period on Netflix.

In 2015, the film was remastered and released on Blu-ray. In 2021, the film was released on the Criterion Channel.

=== Re-release ===
In 2024, It's Such a Beautiful Day was rereleased in theaters for the first time since 2012, paired with the release of Hertzfeldt's newest animated short film ME.

== Reception and legacy ==
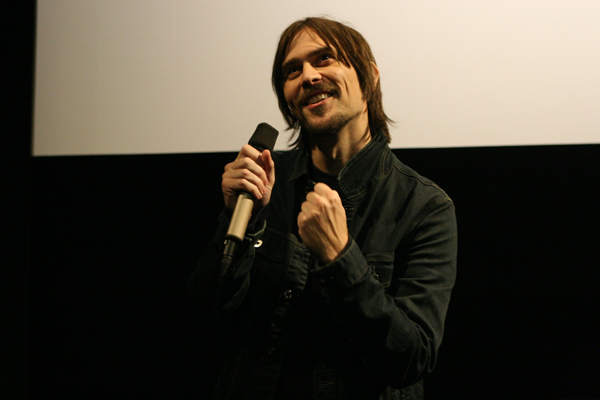
Hertzfeldt received critical acclaim for the film

It's Such a Beautiful Day received critical acclaim; it is regarded as one of the best films of 2012 and among the best animated films of all time. Review aggregation website Rotten Tomatoes gives the film a score of perfect 100% based on 33 reviews, with an average rating of 8.4/10. The website's critical consensus calls the film "an impossibly dense and affecting piece of animated art". Metacritic gives the film a weighted average rating of 90 out of 100, based on reviews from seven critics, indicating "universal acclaim".

Steven Pate of The Chicagoist wrote of the film, "There is a moment in each installment of Don Hertzfeldt's masterful trilogy of animated shorts where you feel something in your chest. It's an unmistakably cardiac event that great art can elicit when something profound and undeniably true is conveyed about the human condition. That's when you say to yourself: are stick figures supposed to make me feel this way? In the hands of a master, yes. And Hertzfeldt is to stick figures what Franz Liszt was to planks of ebony and ivory and what Ted Williams was to a stick of white ash: someone so transcendentally expert that to describe what they do in literal terms is borderline demeaning."

Mike McCahill of The Guardian called it "funny, oddly affecting and cherishably personal" and said that "in a better world, this would be on 300 screens, and filler such as The Croods would have to be smuggled in under the radar". Paul Bradshaw of Total Film called it "an existential flip book and a heartbreaking black joke: stickmen have never looked so alive". Glenn Heath Jr. of Little White Lies gave it a 5/5 score and called it "one of the great films about memory, perspective, and past history".

Upon its original release, the Los Angeles Film Critics Association voted it runner-up for Best Animated Feature Film of the year, behind Frankenweenie. IndieWire ranked Hertzfeldt the 9th best Film Director of the Year in its annual poll (tied with Wes Anderson), and film critics for The A.V. Club ranked the film No. 8 on their list of the Best Films of 2012. Slate named It's Such a Beautiful Day their pick for Best Animated Feature Film of 2012.

In the UK, the film was ranked third on Time Out London's list of the 10 Best Films of 2013 and fourth on The London Film Review's list of the same. In 2014, Time Out ranked It's Such a Beautiful Day at No. 16 on their list of the "100 Best Animated Movies Ever Made". Critic Tom Huddleston described it as "one of the great outsider artworks of the modern era, at once sympathetic and shocking, beautiful and horrifying, angry and hilarious, uplifting and almost unbearably sad".

In 2016, The Film Stage critics ranked the film first on their list of the "Best Animated Films of the 21st Century (So Far)". That same year, three critics polled by the BBC named It's Such a Beautiful Day one of the greatest films made since 2000. In 2019, The Wrap named It's Such a Beautiful Day the "Best Animated Film of the 2010s".

Vulture film critics also ranked it at No. 12 on their overall list of the "Best Movies of the Decade". In 2021, IGN's CineFix gave it the top spot on their "Top 10 Animated Films of All Time" list. In 2025, Clint Bentley cited It's Such a Beautiful Day as one of the influences behind his film, Train Dreams. In 2025, it was ranked #263 in the "Readers' Choice" edition of The New York Times' list of "The 100 Best Movies of the 21st Century." According to a similar list of Letterboxd's highest-rated films of the 21st Century, It's Such a Beautiful Day ranks #20, the highest-rated animated film.
