= Nicktoons Film Festival =

- Title card taken from the first season's intro.
- Genre: Animation
- Created by: Fred Seibert
- Opening theme: "Nicktoons Film Festival" by Bruce W. Kapler (seasons 1–2) "Walk tha Walk" by Andrew Philip Carroll and Nicholas Amour (seasons 3–4)
- Ending theme: "Nicktoons Film Festival" by Bruce W. Kapler (seasons 1–2) "Walk tha Walk" by Andrew Philip Carroll and Nicholas Amour (seasons 3–4)
- Country of origin: United States
- Original language: English
- No. of seasons: 6
- No. of episodes: 114 (261 shorts)

Production
- Executive producer: Fred Seibert
- Producers: Eric Homan; Rita Street; Fred Seibert
- Production companies: Animation Magazine (season 1); Frederator Incorporated

Original release
- Network: Nicktoons Network
- Release: October 24, 2004 – 2009

The Nicktoons Film Festival (also known as the Nicktoons Network Animation Festival and the Nickelodeon Animation Festival) was an annual event that was created by Fred Seibert and produced by Frederator Incorporated. The festival featured a selection of animated shorts (10 minutes and under) from around the world. Shorts selected for the festival had the chance to be aired on Nicktoons Network, online and to be showcased at a live event in Los Angeles in October. Several prizes were awarded each year. Animators under 18 years old were eligible to enter the Greater Creator Contest. The 2009 season was the final season of the festival.

== Winners ==
=== 2004 winners ===
- Grand Prize: Timmy's Lessons In Nature by Mark Simon and Travis Blaise (credited as T.B.)
- Producer's Choice Award: Welcome to My Life by Elizabeth Ito

=== 2005 winners ===
- Grand Prize: La Révolution des Crabes by Arthur DePins
- Producers' Choice: The Naïve Man from Lolliland by J. G. Quintel (basis for Regular Show)
- Student Animator: The Naive Man from Lolliland by J. G. Quintel
- Viewers' Choice: Farm Force by Project Firefly

=== 2006 winners ===
- Grand Prize: The Ballad of Sheep 13 by Kyle McQueen
- Producers' Choice: Super Scout by Amy Poehler (basis for The Mighty B!)
- Student Animator: Animation Test Pilot by Brad Kinley
- Viewers' Choice: Sinking Margot by Julie Bergman

=== 2007 winners ===
- Grand Prize: Zoologic by Nicole Mitchell
- Grand Jury: Zoologic by Nicole Mitchell
- Producers' Choice: St. Laleeloo by Jiwook Kim
- Diversity Award: Feb. 18, 2005 by Javier Barboza
- Student Animator: Bare by Andy Lyon
- Viewers' Choice: After Oz by Percy Kiyabu

== Episodes ==
=== Season 1 (The Nicktoons Film Festival 2004) ===
This featured the original theme song by Bruce W. Kapler from Timbre House Music, Inc.

Judges for this season included:

- veteran animator Eric Goldberg
- Mike Judge (creator of Beavis and Butt-Head and co-creator of King of the Hill)
- John Kricfalusi (creator of Ren & Stimpy)
- Bill Plympton (filmmaker behind Your Face and Guard Dog)
- Genndy Tartakovsky (creator of Dexter's Laboratory, Samurai Jack and Star Wars: Clone Wars)
- voice actor Patrick Warburton
- (81 short films in 12 episodes)
1. Charlie & Chunk (Stop-frame, Clay animation)
2. Timmy's Lessons in Nature (Traditional 2D)
3. It Could Be Worse (Traditional 2D)
4. Childhood Trauma #17 (CG animation, created in Softimage: XSI)
5. Lucky Penny (Traditional 2D)
6. The Manly Bee (Traditional 2D)
7. Day Off the Dead (CG animation)
8. April (Traditional 2D)
9. The Thing with No Head (Traditional 2D)
10. Rotting Hills: Clark's New Home (Animated in Flash)
11. Jack & Jill (CG, animated in Alias' Maya Software)
12. Attack of the Note Sheep (Traditional 2D, composited with live-action footage)
13. At Wit's Vend (CG animation, completed in Alias' Maya software)
14. The 9th Life of Sherman Phelps: Serenity Now (Animated in Flash)
15. Boing Boing (CG using Alias' Maya software)
16. Scout Says (Traditional 2D with digital color)
17. Magnetism (Animated in Alias' Maya software with Adobe Photoshop and After Effects)
18. Atomic Love (Traditional 2D with 3D elements)
19. Birdon (CG animation)
20. Ape Escape, Part I (CG animation)
21. Winged Devices (CG animation)
22. Miracle Koala: Belt for Punishment (Animated in Flash)
23. Sucker (3D created in Alias' Maya software)
24. Monkey Fuss (2D using Adobe Premier, Photoshop, and After Effects)
25. Bert (CG with 2D textures)
26. Heads, You Lose! (CG animation)
27. Manbird (Animated from Flash to QuickTime)
28. Monstories: Fine Diners (2D & 3D Mix)
29. Interrogating Ernie (Stop-frame & CG animation)
30. Hairy Affairs (CG animation)
31. Lou & Costa: Burglar Welcome Mat (2D animation)
32. Roy & Dog (CG animation)
33. Thirsty (Pencil on Mark & Paper)
34. Dia de Los Muertos (Stop-frame & CG animation)
35. Skippy (Traditional 2D)
36. The Not So Heroic Adventures of Sidekick: Dooms Day Dog (Animated in Flash)
37. <ESC> (CG created in Hash Animation Master)
38. A Rhinocervs (2D animation)
39. Tell Me Not to Worry (CG, 2D, and Stop-frame)
40. Happy Mania (Adobe PhotoShop and After Effects)
41. Welcome To My Life (Hand-drawn 2D; remade as a pilot for Cartoon Network in 2015)
42. Kactus Kid (Animated in Flash and Traditional 2D)
43. Robot Family: The Slick Salesman (Digital 2D)
44. Wingnut (CG animation)
45. Medusa: Pilot (Stop-frame animation)
46. Martini and Meatballs: Avery's Game (Animated in Flash)
47. Gruesomenstein's Monsters: Freddie and the Yeti (Animated in Flash)
48. PGi-13 (CG with 2D sequences)
49. Hero: 108 (Animated in Flash; basis for the series on Cartoon Network)
50. Josh W. Eats a Bug (Traditional animation)
51. Zoya the Zebra (2D animation)
52. Doggie Door (Traditional animation)
53. Bottom of the 9th (CG animation created in Alias' Maya software)
54. The Turn-Off (2D cut-out animation with a 3D character)
55. It's My Turn (Animated in Pencil)
56. Kenya (Animated in Flash)
57. Coolman: Deep Sea Blues (Animated in Flash)
58. Haina: A Concert (2D animation)
59. Gumbusters (2D animation)
60. Ape Escape, Part II (CG animation)
61. The Wild Wild Circus Company: Fishy Memories (2D animation with 3D textures)
62. Loco Melones (3D animated in SoftImage XSI)
63. Playing Cricket (3D animated in Hash's Animation Master)
64. Beach Booty (2D, edited in Adobe Premiere and After Effects)
65. Fool Throttle (Animated in Flash)
66. Monkey, Monkey (2D animation)
67. Rustbuckets: The Last Rainforest (CG animation)
68. Six Snails Snoring (Animated in Flash)
69. Pigly (3D animation completed with Alias' Maya software)
70. Much Ado About Ice Cream (2D animation)
71. Shlub (2D animation)
72. Polygon Family II (3D animation completed with Alias' Maya software)
73. The Appointment (2D animation with digital color)
74. Magical Trevor (2D animation)
75. Nagymamma (Traditional animation)
76. Rockfish (3D animation completed with Discreet's 3dsmax)
77. The Tribe (Flash 2D animation)
78. Bath Time (3D animation)
79. Harold Rosenbaum Chartered Accountant Extreme: Ledger Boy Liquidation (Animated in Flash)
80. Minue (2D animation)
81. Ape Escape, Part III (CG animation)

=== Season 2 (The NEXTOONS: The Nicktoons Film Festival 2005) ===
This is the last season to use Bruce W. Kapler's theme song.

Judges for this season included:

- David X. Cohen (former writer of The Simpsons and writer, producer and showrunner of Futurama)
- Michael DiMartino and Bryan Konietzko (creators of Avatar: The Last Airbender)
- veteran animator Mike Gabriel
- voice actor Mark Hamill
- Don Hertzfeldt (filmmaker behind Rejected and The Meaning of Life)
1. La Révolution des Crabes (2D & 3D combo)
2. Hobbies: Model Bus Collector (CG animation)
3. Runaway Bathtub (Paper cut-out & stop-frame)
4. Unmarked (3D animation)
5. Those Scurvy Rascals (3D animation)
6. Her Teddy Bear (Classic 2D animation)
7. Blue Dress (CG animation)
8. Man's First Friend (CG animation)
9. Terrance Eats Knowledge (Hand-drawn & 2D digital animation)
10. Up, Up & Away (CG animation)
11. Like Pandas (Flash animation)
12. Pen vs. Pencil (CG animation)
13. Plumber (CG animation)
14. Anthem (CG animation)
15. Peeves: Toilet Water (Flash animation)
16. Short Circuit (Hand-drawn animation)
17. Soup (Stop-motion)
18. A Sixty Second Tragedy (CG animation)
19. The Naive Man from Lolliland (Hand-drawn, digitally composited; adapted into Regular Show)
20. Tricks for a Treat (Hand-drawn animation)
21. Prey (Hand-drawn animation)
22. Chris Walker's Unfortunate Alphabet (Hand-drawn & CG-mixed)
23. The Mousochist (Hand-drawn animation)
24. First Kiss (Hand-drawn, digitally composited)
25. Maestro (CG animation)
26. The Gross Hunger (Hand-drawn animation)
27. Getting Ice Cream (CG animation)
28. Out of Beat (Paper cut-outs and digital animation)
29. Mig Said... (Flash animation)
30. Help! (CG animation)
31. The Z-Files (Flash animation)
32. The Monster Within (CG animation)
33. To a Man with a Big Nose (2D and CG combo)
34. Mille (CG animation)
35. Over the Moon (Hand-drawn & CG combo)
36. Anaka (CG animation)
37. Oh, Dear! (Hand-drawn animation)
38. A Short Visit to Toy Town (CG animation)
39. Love Affair (Hand-drawn animation)
40. Five Informercials for Dentists (Hand-drawn animation)
41. Defective (CG animation)
42. Betty (CG animation)
43. Nulbur (Flash animation)
44. In-Out (CG animation)
45. The Laws of Gravity (Flash animation)
46. The Life of a Mime (CG animation)
47. Fee Fi Fo Fum (Digital cut-out)
48. Sing-a-Long with Roosevelt (CG animation)
49. Un-Doo (stop-motion)
50. Egghunt (CG animation)
51. Farm Force (2D animation)
52. Project Firefly, created by Ethan Long and produced by Robin Cowie; aired on August 27, 2005

=== Season 3 (The Nicktoons Network Animation Festival 2006) ===
The 2006 Nicktoons Network Animation Festival aired on Nicktoons Saturday, August 26, 2006– Wednesday, August 30, 2006. Winners were announced on Thursday, August 31, 2006. This season introduced a new theme song.

Judges for this season included:

- veteran animator and historian Jerry Beck
- Seth MacFarlane (creator of Family Guy and co-creator of American Dad! and The Cleveland Show)
- Chris Prynoski (founder of Titmouse, Inc., best known for The Venture Bros., Superjail, Metalocalypse and Motorcity)
- Steve Oedekerk (co-creator of Jimmy Neutron and creator of Barnyard)
- comedians and actors Shawn and Marlon Wayans
1. A Great Big Robot from Outer Space Ate My Homework (CGI animation)
2. The Tale of How (2D CGI, Flash, Cutout)
3. Great Apespectations (Traditional 2D)
4. Handshake (Traditional animation)
5. Bip Bip (Cutout)
6. Dog Worries (Computer 2D)
7. The Ballad of Sheep 13 (Classical 2D)
8. Late Night Comedy (CGI animation)
9. La Tete Dans les Nuages (The Head in the Clouds) (CGI animation)
10. Super Scout (Traditional 2D; adapted into The Mighty B!)
11. Libraryhead (Traditional 2D)
12. Penguin Day Spa Commercial (CGI animation)
13. Ballyvaughan Story (Traditional 2D)
14. Doodle of Doom (Hand-Drawn, Flash)
15. Juxtaposer (Traditional animation)
16. Animation Test Pilot (CG)
17. Engrish Bwudd (Stopmotion, 2D drawn, Pixelation; music video for "Engwish Bwudd" by Man Man)
18. Abstract (Flash)
19. Breakfast with The King (CG)
20. The Mad Scientist Show: The Transporter (Flash)
21. Giant's Kitchen (Traditional 2D)
22. Crocodile Journals (Stopmotion)
23. La Mia Migliore Amica (Flash)
24. A Choreography with White-Fronted Geese, Horses, and a Locomotive (3D animation)
25. Deep Six (Digital Flash)
26. Eureka! (3D animation)
27. Gorilla (Pencil on Paper)
28. The New Guy (Flash)
29. The M Man (Hand-Drawn)
30. I Love You Kitty (Traditional 2D)
31. The Sunshine (CG)
32. Manege Frei (Flash)
33. Egg Song (Flash)
34. Zeitsprung Timetravels (3D)
35. Exit (3D)
36. Small and Deep, Love Stories (2D digital cutout and Hand-Drawn)
37. The Passenger (3D)
38. Sinking Margot (3D)
39. The Moustache Contest (Flash)
40. Snout (CG)
41. Polka (Pencil on Paper)

=== Season 4 (2007) ===
Judges for this season included:

- John Dilworth (creator of Courage the Cowardly Dog)
- Eric Fogel (creator of Celebrity Deathmatch)
- Craig McCracken (creator of The Powerpuff Girls, Foster's Home for Imaginary Friends and Wander Over Yonder)
- Dan Povenmire and Jeff "Swampy" Marsh (creators of Phineas and Ferb)
- veteran animator Will Vinton
- Chris Wedge (filmmaker behind Bunny, Ice Age and Robots)
1. L’amie De Zoe (3D)
2. Zoologic (2D animation)
3. Saalis (cut-outs)
4. Soñadora (stop motion)
5. Bare (pencil on paper, watercolor)
6. Striped (Classical animation, colored in Photoshop, composited in After Effects)
7. Hedgehug (2D computer, Flash)
8. Hominid (Trad. 2D [brush and ink, digital ink and paint])
9. Kiwi! (3D animation)
10. Carried Away (3D computer)
11. Monster on the Moon (Stop Motion, Cut-outs)
12. José y Maria (Traditional animation [Hand-drawn])
13. Angst (Mixed technique: pencil drawings/video/photo/3DFX)
14. A Peach for the Teach (Traditional hand-drawn animation, colored on computer)
15. Freewheel (Hand-drawn, water-colored, After Effects; music video for "Freewheel" by Duke Special)
16. Cranks (3D computer)
17. Feb-18-05 (drawing)
18. Mortimer Pigmun and His Time Traveling Chums (stop motion)
19. St. Laleeloo (2D traditional)
20. Barfy the Pig in a Day in the Park (3D)
21. Process Enacted (pixilation/stop-motion)
22. Old Chestnut (2D animation, Adobe After Effects)
23. Puppet (Hand-drawn, color/composite digitally)
24. Zoologic (Hand-drawn animation or Traditional animation)
25. After Oz (3D)
26. The Little Dictator (2D computer)
27. Think Like a Frog (Flash)
28. Art's Desire (2D with 3D backgrounds)
29. Loose Change (Computer animation)
30. Insomnia (pastels on paper)

=== Season 5 (2008) ===
Nicktoons Network Animation Festival: 5th Year Animation Matters

Judges for this season included:

- Shane Acker (filmmaker behind 9 (both short and feature length films)
- Danny Antonucci (creator of Ed, Edd n' Eddy)
- voice actor Dee Bradley Baker
- Peter Chung (creator of Æon Flux)
- Tom McGrath (filmmaker behind Madagascar, Megamind and The Boss Baby)
- Gregg Vanzo (founder of Rough Draft Studios, best known for Futurama and Drawn Together)
1. Alien Abduction (3-D Animation)
2. Once Upon a Tyme (3-D animation)
3. Lilium Urbanus (3-D Animation)
4. Red & Blue (3-D animation)
5. Paper Cut (2-D Animation)
6. Theatrum Comicum of Insects (2-D Animation)
7. Boogie and Diggie (2-D Animation)
8. The Adventures of Jane (2-D Flash Animation)
9. Dive (3-D Animation)
10. Mock and Boy'd: Get Out Of My Tree (2-D Animation)
11. Getting Suspended (Sketching)
12. Kid Show (Drawing Animation)
13. Hal Mang (2-D Animation)
14. The Matchbook (3-D Animation)
15. La Lune (3-D animation)
16. The Space Burger (2-D Animation)
17. Galactic Adventure Quest in Space (2-D Animation)
18. Henshin (3-D Animation)
19. Sheep (Stop-Motion)
20. Come Back Sweetheart (3-D Animation)
21. Monster Movie (2-D Animation)
22. El Mono (3-D Animation)
23. Solar (3-D animation)
24. Bathtime in Clerkenwell (2-D Animation)
25. A Faery's Tale (3-D animation)
26. Sticky the Stick (series) (2-D Flash Animation)
27. Go Nuts Animation (2-D Animation)
28. Pea on the Screws (Hand-Drawn 2-D animation)
29. Pajama Gladiator (3-D Animation)

=== Season 6: Nickelodeon Animation Festival 2009 ===
2009 was the final season of the festival.

1. Insert Coin
2. Kina Sky
3. Magic Theater
4. Mariza
5. No Quarter
6. Oakley and Bud in 'Rogue UFO'
7. Otis v. Monster
8. Pencilmation #7: Malice in Wonderland
9. Popped
10. Shiny!
11. So Close to the Sun
12. Some Facts About Owls
13. Squeak
14. Tang
15. The History of an Animation
16. The History of Man Part 2
17. The Switch
18. Tickle Me Silly
19. Ultra Super Sudden Death
20. Value Blind
21. Vampirofaga
22. At Deaths Door
23. Barfy the Pig: Episode 6
24. Best Present Ever
25. Cricket
26. Deadline
27. Divers
28. Flying Boy
29. Hubo
30. Do Not Feed the Alligators

== Legacy ==
Frederator Studios has persisted in the tradition of surfacing new talent, characters, and series in several ways, with The Nicktoons Film Festival being the first to present short cartoons recently produced by independent filmmakers around the world. This tradition has continued online with their Channel Frederator network, the world's largest animation network, with over 3000 members who produce and program their own YouTube animation channels. Some of the most notable entries include The Naive Man from Lolliland, Super Scout, To a Man with a Big Nose, The Tale of How, Bathtime in Clerkenwell, Kiwi!, both Weebl's shorts Kenya and Magical Trevor, the Ape Escape trilogy of shorts, Charlie & Chunk, The Mouschist, Prey, Hero: 108, Bert, Engrish Bwudd, Skippy, Monster on the Moon, Pigly, Libraryhead, Over the Moon, Feb-18-05, Timmy's Lessons In Nature, Farm Force, Late Night Comedy, Zoologic, Maestro, Zoya the Zebra, PGi-13, Loco Melones, Rockfish, and Welcome to My Life. Certain shorts featured here were produced by Nelvana, and those were also shown on YTV's Funpak, such as The Not-So-Superheroic Adventures of Sidekick, which spawned Sidekick.

To a Man with a Big Nose was selected for the 2006 Fargo Film Festival in addition to being a Nicktoons Film Festival entry, Bathtime in Clerkenwell won three awards in 2004 including one category from Sundance.

Kiwi! and both weebl's Kenya and Magical Trevor were considered major internet memes at that time (and had previously aired on MTV a year prior).

Engrish Bwudd was entered in the festival, which was also an animated music video from the rock band Man Man. Their music video, which was directed by Lindsay Kovna, had also aired on MTV to promote their album Six Demon Bag.

The Mouschist was created by Courage the Cowardly Dog creator John R. Dilworth.

The Ape Escape trilogy of shorts that were previously aired as its subsequent anthology series as to promote the game series exclusively for Sony's own PlayStation 2 at its home country during the time (and had eventually aired its own series on Nicktoons five years later).

The four were precursor shorts—Super Scout, The Naive from Loli Land, Hero: 108 and Welcome to My Life—would eventually become precursor to Nickelodeon's own The Mighty B! (which, like the short itself, featured comedian Amy Poehler, at the time well known her work in Saturday Night Live and Parks and Recreation on NBC, and also the 2004 film Mean Girls) and Cartoon Network's Regular Show and Hero: 108, as well as the latter's failed pilot of the same name.

Simultaneously, Frederator has produced 250 original short cartoon films with several cartoon shorts "incubators," including (as of 2016): What A Cartoon! (Cartoon Network, 1995), Oh Yeah! Cartoons (Nickelodeon, 1998), The Meth Minute 39 (Channel Frederator, 2008), Random! Cartoons (Nickelodeon/Nicktoons, 2008), Too Cool! Cartoons (Cartoon Hangover, 2012), and GO! Cartoons (Cartoon Hangover, 2016). These laboratories have spun off notable series like: Dexter's Laboratory, The Powerpuff Girls, Johnny Bravo, Cow & Chicken, Courage the Cowardly Dog, Larry & Steve (which was the basis for Fox's own Family Guy), Kenny and the Chimp (which was the basis for Codename: Kids Next Door), Grim & Evil (which was split into Evil Con Carne and The Grim Adventures of Billy & Mandy), The Fairly OddParents, My Life as a Teenage Robot, ChalkZone, Nite Fite, Fanboy & Chum Chum, Adventure Time, Bravest Warriors, Rocket Dog, and Bee and PuppyCat.

== See also ==
- Spike and Mike's Festival of Animation
- Fantastic Animation Festival
- Tournee of Animation
