= Colucci =

Colucci is a surname, and may refer to:

- Giuseppe Colucci (antiquarian) - Italian historian
- Leonardo Colucci - Italian retired footballer and coach
- Jill Colucci - American songwriter and vocalist
- Reinaldo Colucci - Brazilian triathlete
- Ryan Colucci - American feature film producer, writer and comic book creator
- Coluche born Michel Gérard Joseph Colucci - French comedian and actor
- Mia Colucci (disambiguation), characters in the telenovela Rebelde Way
- Vincenzo Colucci - Neapolitan artist of seaside scenes; 20th century
- Vincenzo Colucci - Italian professor of veterinary science in latter part of the 19th century; best known for work on salamander eye, limb, and tail regeneration. Biography included in Holland (2021).
