= Little Torments =

EP by Man Man
- Released: September 2008
- Genre: Experimental rock
- Label: Obey Your Brain

Man Man chronology
Rabbit Habits (2008)	Little Torments (2008)	Life Fantastic (2011)

Little Torments is a 7-inch EP by the experimental rock group Man Man.

The two tracks were taken from sessions that comprised the material for the albums Six Demon Bag and Rabbit Habits. The song "Little Torments" was recorded originally as a proposed theme for a cartoon.

== Track listing ==
1. "Little Torments"
2. "Snakehandling The Moon Sault Kick Comeback"
