= Dane Allan Smith =

Visual effects producer

Dane Allan Smith (died 2025) was a film and television producer, and visual effects producer. Smith manages daily operations as founding partner of Daneiam Inc., a studio through which Smith has served as visual effects producer for films including Hellboy II: The Golden Army (2008), Sinister 2 (2015), Deadpool, Star Trek Beyond (both 2016), and Star Wars: The Last Jedi (2017). He has also worked as a visualization executive producer, and founded Artificial Intelligence + ML Visual Effects resource Parts + Labor in 2023.

Smith died in 2025.

At the 98th Academy Awards, his name was mentioned in the In Memoriam section.

== Education ==
Smith attended York University in Toronto. He graduated with a Communications major in 1984.

== Career ==
=== Menithings Productions ===
In 1999, Smith founded Menithings Productions which contributed visual effects for Hellboy (film). Menithings also produced The Freak and Battle for Terra, two short CGI animated films. For his work on Battle of Terra, he won the Grand Prize for Best Animated Feature at the 2008 Ottawa International Animation Festival.

=== Stereoscopic Conversion ===
Smith's production company Daneiam Inc. acquired various post production processes designed to optimize global specialty studios networked to a central location. After the filmmaking community initial expressed preference for native stereoscopic capture, the automation of rotoscopy, development of proprietary extrusion techniques capable of ultra high detail, along with advanced digital paint tools shifted preference to the legitimate use of stereoscopic conversion. A process that evolved to expand Danes oversight to multiple, concurrent Producer duties for projects including of director James Cameron's Deepsea Challenge 3D production. As producer, Smith delivered 1,468 shots that required bespoke lighting and compositing pipelines driving digital intermediary and color standards, optimized for stereoscopic conversion. Digital Cinema packages were leveraged to offer more latitude for creative experimentation. Dane helped design the cross department team to support his production of Battle for Terra to stereoscopic 3D for theatrical release. The techniques and scalable team drew expanded to support notable contributions to Harry Potter and the Deathly Hallows – Part 1, Harry Potter and the Deathly Hallows – Part 2, R.I.P.D., and Hansel & Gretel: Witch Hunters.

=== Gnomon School of Visual Effects ===
In 2010, he joined the Gnomon School of Visual Effects as faculty where he instructs students in courses that include: Virtual Reality Production, The History of Visual Effects, and Stereoscopic Filmmaking techniques and practices. In 2021, in partnership with Epic Unreal Smith launched the first ever Virtual Production course of Study at Gnomon School of VFX and Gaming.

=== Visual effects ===
Smith has been the visual effects producer on numerous VFX driven features, including Harry Potter and the Deathly Hallows – Part 1 (2010) and Part 2 (2011), The Amazing Spider-Man, Looper (both 2012), Oblivion (2013), and The Walk (2015). In 2015, Smith served as visual effects producer on Anomalisa directed by Charlie Kaufman; the film was nominated for an Academy Award for Best Animated Feature.

=== Visualization / virtual production ===
In 2017, Dane joined The Third Floor, Inc. Dane served as CSO and key representative to clients (Studio Management, Directors and Producers), as well as business unit employees, and the managing board throughout the global organization. Dane oversaw the development of projects where previs, virtual production and real-time rendering made significant in-roads. He managed the deployment of technology that rendered high-quality visuals in real-time and worked with real-world input devices such as mocap and cameras. This hybrid Maya/Unreal approach allowed his team to more easily provide tools like a virtual camera (Vcam), VR scouting and AR on-set apps.

=== Virtual reality ===
Smith founded Ember Immersive in 2015 to bring premium cinematic VR experiences to the world through distribution/production of content, products (e.g. cameras), and VR Technology. Smith produced Stan Lee's combined Cosmic Crusaders VR. The debut episode will be presented in virtual reality, with one episode airing each day during Comic-Con International 2016 via smartphone VR viewers to be handed out at the show.

=== Producers Guild of America ===
Smith is also a member of the PGA as a PGA Innovation Award Jury, Power of Diversity Master workshop and the Animation and Visual Effects Committee.

=== Author ===
In 2002 Smith was invited to curate and expand the Visual Effects Society Handbook Volume 3, wrote contributing content as part of subject matter experts as part of his remit as The Virtual Production Field Guide V02 took shape. Spring 2023 saw a special edition of the VES Handbook, dedicated entirely to Virtual Production publish as part of the effort to document this evolving process.

=== Public speaking ===
Smith has spoken at multiple engagements including, SIGGRAPH, CES, the PGA Animation Committee panels, ASIFA/WONDERCON panel 2019, Comicon VES, VRLA, LA Games Conference 2019, NAB Shanghai 2019, VR on The LOT, DIGITAL HOLLYWOOD. Otis College of Art and Design Digital Media Panels SXSW 2020, 2021, 2022 Visual Effects Society Vision Committee 2020 IAAPA 2021 EXPO as well as The World Animation & VFX Summit and keynote speaker at NAB 2021 and HPA 2022 Palm Springs, CA.

== Awards ==
- 2022 THEA Award Outstanding Achievement – Attraction for The Secret Life of Pets – Off the Leash! at Universal Studios Hollywood
- 2022 Outstanding Achievement – Technical Innovation for Mario Kart: Koopa's Challenge at Universal Studios Japan
- 2022 Outstanding Achievement – Theme Park Land for Super Nintendo World at Universal Studios Japan
- 2019 Promax Games Awards Far Cry 5: Story Trailer
- 2019 CLIO Kait, Broken Games Award
- 2017 Telly Awards, Won Bronze Telly for Stan Lee's Cosmic Crusaders: VR Experience
- 2017 Telly Award Race Through New York with Jimmy Fallon
- 2016 Academy Awards Best Animated Feature Nomination Anomalisa
- 2009 Philadelphia FirstGlance Film Festival, FirstGlance Award for Berni's Doll
- 2008 Giffoni Film Festival, Won Silver Gryphon for Terra
- 2004 Academy Award Best Short Film Nomination Animated Destino

== Notable film and television work ==
- Titanic (1997)
- Battle for Terra (2007)
- Harry Potter and the Deathly Hallows – Part 1 (2010)
- Harry Potter and the Deathly Hallows – Part 2 (2011)
- The Amazing Spider-Man (2012)
- Looper (2012)
- Star Trek Into Darkness (2013)
- Thor: The Dark World (2013)
- Deepsea Challenge 3D (2014)
- Transformers: Age of Extinction (2014)
- Game of Thrones (2015)
- The Man in the High Castle (2015)
- Anomalisa (2015)
- Star Wars: The Last Jedi (2017)
- Avengers: Infinity War (2018)
- Ant-Man and the Wasp (2018)
- Aquaman (2018)
- Solo: A Star Wars Story (2018)
- Captain Marvel (2019)
- Avengers: Endgame (2019)
- Spider-Man: Far from Home (2019)
- For All Mankind (2019)
- The Mandalorian (2019)
- The Boys (2019)
- Star Wars: The Rise of Skywalker (2019)
- Lovecraft Country (2020)
- WandaVision (2021)
- Godzilla vs. Kong (2021)
- The Tomorrow War (2021)
- The Suicide Squad (2021)
- Shang-Chi and the Legend of the Ten Rings (2021)
- The Lord of the Rings: The Rings of Power (2022)
- The Batman (2022)
- Andor (TV series) (2022)
- Willow (TV series) (2022)
- Ant-Man and the Wasp: Quantumania (2023)
- Shazam! Fury of the Gods (2023)
- Guardians of the Galaxy Vol. 3 (2023)
