= Aristomenis Tsirbas =

Canadian-American film director

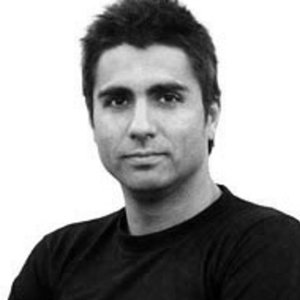
- Born: Montreal, Quebec, Canada.
- Occupations: Film director, screenwriter, film editor, visual effects supervisor, animator
- Years active: 1995–present
- Known for: Timescape (2022 film)

Aristomenis (Meni) Tsirbas is a film director, producer, writer, editor, animator, concept designer, storyboard artist, and visual effects supervisor. He has directed two feature films, several national television commercials, music videos, and short films. Meni's films have received over two dozen international awards from film festivals such as Sundance, Hollywood, and Palm Springs. He is president of MeniThings Productions.

== Background ==
Meni was born in Montreal, Canada where he majored in film production at Concordia University. After directing commercials at his Montreal company, Trimension, Meni moved to Los Angeles in 1996 to work as a CG artist on James Cameron’s Titanic and national advertising spots for Nike, 7UP and Coca-Cola. He then rose to VFX supervisor for Miramax’s A Wrinkle in Time, Disney's My Favorite Martian and Paramount’s Star Trek: Deep Space Nine.

In 1999, Tsirbas returned to directing full-time with a string of award-winning short films, game cinematics, and music videos including SIGGRAPH’s Ray Tracey in Full Tilt, Microsoft’s Mech Warrior: Vengeance, Terra, and The Freak, before embarking on his first feature film, Battle for Terra.

Meni followed up with two more short films, Anthro and Exoids at DAVE School and Gnomon School of Visual Effects respectively, before joining Blur Studio in 2012, where he directed a dozen national American television spots for Goldfish Crackers.

In 2019 Tsirbas directed his second feature, Timescape, which was released in 2022.

== Feature films ==
- Battle for Terra (2009) (Writer, Director)
- Timescape (2023) (Screenwriter, Editor, Director)

== Short films ==
- Ray Tracey in Full Tilt (2000) (Writer, Director, Animator)
- MechWarrior 4: Vengeance - Opening Cinematic (2000) (Director)
- The Freak (2001) (Writer, Director, Animator)
- Terra (2002) (Writer, Director, Animator)
- Plus Minus (2010) (Co-Director)
- Exoids (2012) (Writer, Director)

== Commercials ==
- E.T. ID for MusiquePlus (1996) (Writer, Director, Animator)
- Montreal International Auto Show Theatrical Commercial (1996) (Writer, Director, Animator)
- Virtual Andre (1997) (Concept Designer, Animator)
- Taco Bell Mario Kart 64 (1998) (Storyboard Artist, Concept Designer, Camera, Animator)
- Goldfish: The Thing (2017) (Director)
- Goldfish: Selfies (2017) (Director)
- Goldfish: Spinny Spinny Spin Spin (2018) (Director)
- Goldfish: Comic Book (2018) (Director)
- Goldfish: Brooke Ball (2018) (Director)
- Goldfish: The Internet (2018) (director)

== Music videos ==
- Tears For Fears: Closets Thing to Heaven (Concept Design, VFX Director)
- Udora: Fade Away (Director)

== Visual effects ==
- Star Trek: Voyager (TV series) (1995) (Digital Artist)
- Titanic (1997) (Feature film) (Digital Artist)
- Star Trek: Deep Space Nine (TV series) (1999) (Visual Effects Supervisor, Station X)
- My Favorite Martian (Feature Film) (1999) (Visual Effects Supervisor, Station X Studios)
- Dogma (Digital Creative Director, Station X Studios)
- A Wrinkle in Time (Visual Effects Supervisor, MeniThings)

== Awards ==
- 1997 Clio Award, Silver Clio - Animation, Nike Virtual Andre
- 2001 New York International Independent Film & Video Festival, Best Animation, Ray Tracey in Full Tilt
- 2002 The Hollywood Film Awards, Best Animated Short, The Freak
- 2002 Palm Springs International ShortFest, Jury Award, The Freak
- 2002 One Reel Film Fest, Best Animated Film, The Freak
- 2002 IFCT, Best Use of Computer Animated Imagery, The Freak
- 2003 Sundance Film Festival, Honorable Mention, The Freak
- 2003 San Francisco IFF Golden Gate Award, The Freak
- 2003 Malibu Film Festival, Audience Choice Award, The Freak
- 2003 Black Maria Film Festival, Directors Choice, The Freak
- 2003 Festival Du Cinema De Paris, Best Director, The Freak
- 2003 Philadelphia Film Festival, Best Short, The Freak
- 2003 Hong Kong Film Fest, Best Animated Film, Terra
- 2003 Palm Springs International ShortFest, Audience Award, Terra
- 2003 Ulisses Film Festival, Best Animated Film, The Freak
- 2003 Cinanima, Best Animation Direction, Terra
- 2004 Anima, First Prize, The Freak
- 2004 AIFF, Audience Award, The Freak
- 2004 Black Maria Film Festival, Directors Choice, Terra
- 2004 San Diego Film Festival, Audience Award Best Short, Terra
- 2007 Tehran International Film Festival, Grand Prix, Battle For Terra
- 2008 Giffoni Film Festival, Silver Gryphon Award, Battle For Terra
- 2008 Heartland International Film Festival, Crystal Heart Award, Battle For Terra
- 2008 Ottawa International Animation Festival, Best Animated Feature, Battle For Terra
