= Harbor Moon =

2010 graphic novel

Harbor Moon is an original horror graphic novel created by Ryan Colucci in 2010. Written by Colucci and Dikran Ornekian, with a story by Brian Anderson and artwork by Polish artist Pawel Sambor.

The book debuted at San Diego Comic-con 2010 through Shuster award winning publisher Arcana Studio.

Harbor Moon tells the story of professional soldier Timothy Vance. When he receives information from someone claiming to be his long-lost father, he takes a trip to out-of-the-way Harbor Moon, Maine. It turns out that man hasn’t been there in thirty years and pretty soon Tim’s life is in danger. Fighting for the truth and his survival, Tim discovers that Harbor Moon is harboring a secret. The entire town is werewolves and the man he was looking for may be just like them. Just as a ruthless band of werewolf hunters descend upon the town, Tim must decide whether he is going to stay and fight or turn his back on what he really is.
