= Beyond White Space =

- Film poster
- Directed by: Ken Locsmandi
- Written by: Ryan Colucci; Clay McLeod Chapman
- Produced by: Ryan Colucci; James Devoti; Mark B. Newbauer
- Starring: Holt McCallany
- Cinematography: Tom Clancey
- Edited by: Yoshio Kohashi; Eric Potter
- Music by: Nima Fakhrara; Navid Hejazi
- Production companies: Spoke Lane Entertainment; Filmworks/FX; White Space Productions
- Distributed by: Vertical Entertainment
- Release date: December 14, 2018
- Running time: 93 minutes
- Countries: United States; Hungary
- Language: English

Beyond White Space is a 2018 American-Hungarian science fiction thriller film directed by Ken Locsmandi and starring Holt McCallany about the crew of a commercial vessel at the edge of uncharted space who encounter a rare and valuable alien creature, and the captain intent to capture it.

== Plot summary ==
The USS Essex is travelling in the furthest reaches of the known Universe when it encounters a gigantic creature. After pirates steal their cargo and most of their supplies the captain decides to capture the creature. The creature is a rare and nearly extinct species and the captain soon becomes obsessed with succeeding in its capture. The crew of the ship becomes mutinous, and soon after the gigantic and deadly creature attacks the ship.

== Cast ==
- Holt McCallany - Richard Bentley
- Zulay Henao - Lynn Navarro
- James Devoti - Owen Bentley
- Jocko Sims - Harpo
- Kodi Kitchen - Batali
- Dave Sheridan - Stubniski
- Mike Genovese - Hawthorne
- Tiffany Brouwer - Ragsland
- Isaac C. Singleton Jr. - Lt. Boomer

== Release ==
Vertical Entertainment acquired North American distribution rights to the film in September 2018. The film was released in limited theaters and on VOD on December 14, 2018.

== Reception ==
The Hollywood Reporter gave the film a negative review, calling it "Good-looking but dimwitted sci-fi."
