= Battle for Terra =

- Theatrical release poster
- Directed by: Aristomenis Tsirbas
- Screenplay by: Evan Spiliotopoulos
- Story by: Aristomenis Tsirbas
- Produced by: Ryan Colucci; Keith Calder; Dane Allan Smith; Jessica Wu
- Starring: Evan Rachel Wood; Brian Cox; James Garner; Chris Evans; Danny Glover; Amanda Peet; David Cross; Justin Long; Dennis Quaid; Luke Wilson
- Cinematography: Aristomenis Tsirbas
- Edited by: J. Kathleen Gibson; Jim May
- Music by: Abel Korzeniowski
- Production companies: IM Global; Snoot Toons
- Distributed by: Lionsgate; Roadside Attractions
- Release dates: September 8, 2007 (TIFF); May 1, 2009 (United States)
- Running time: 79 minutes
- Country: United States
- Language: English
- Budget: $4-8 million
- Box office: $6.2 million

Battle for Terra, originally screened as Terra, is a 2007 American animated action-adventure science fiction film, based on the short film Terra, about a race of beings on a peaceful alien planet who face destruction from colonization by the displaced remainder of the human race. The film was directed by Aristomenis Tsirbas who conceived it as a hard-edged live action feature with photo-real Computer-Generated Imagery (CGI) environments. The close collaboration with producing partner and investor Snoot Entertainment redirected the project to become fully animated and appeal to younger audiences. The film features the voices of Evan Rachel Wood, Luke Wilson, Brian Cox and James Garner (In his last major film role before his death) among others.

It premiered on September 8, 2007 at the Toronto International Film Festival and was widely released in the United States on May 1, 2009 by Lionsgate and Roadside Attractions.

The film was originally shot in 2D but was made in such a way that a second camera could be added to the film. After the film was shown at festivals and distributors showed an interest in it, a small team was hired to render the entire film again from the perspective of the second camera for a true 3D effect. It won the Grand Prize for Best Animated Feature at the 2008 Ottawa International Animation Festival.

== Plot ==
Mala and her friend Senn are young creatures of an alien race inhabiting Terra, a peaceful planet in a star system in the Milky Way galaxy.

When a large object partially obscures Terra's sun, Mala defies Terrian rules forbidding unapproved technology and builds a telescope. She discovers that the object, the Ark, is launching recon ships that abduct Terrians, some of whom willingly surrender themselves, believing the humans to be new "gods". After Mala's father, Roven, is abducted, she lures a ship into a trap and rescues its human pilot, Lieutenant James "Jim" Stanton. With help from Jim's personal robot assistant, Giddy, she creates an oxygen-filled shelter for him and learns human language.

Giddy explains that humans previously terraformed and colonised Mars and Venus, but their demands for independence from Earth led to a war that made all three planets uninhabitable. The Ark, a generation ship carrying the surviving humans, has spent generations searching for a new home and named the planet Terra upon arrival. Mala agrees to repair Jim's ship so that she can rescue Roven, but discovers it has been moved.

Mala, Jim and Giddy trace the ship to a secret underground military facility where the elders and council leader Doron preserve technology from earlier conflicts. After repairing it, they travel to the Ark, where General Hemmer, commander of the human army, seizes control in a coup and declares war on Terra. Mala finds Roven but is captured. During the ensuing struggle, Roven accidentally causes a decompression that kills both himself and several guards.

Hemmer reveals his plan to transform Terra into a new Earth using the Terraformer, a machine that will create an Earth-like atmosphere but annihilate the Terrians. He tests Jim's loyalty by forcing him to choose between Mala and his younger brother Stewart. Jim saves Stewart while secretly ordering Giddy to rescue Mala. Hemmer then assigns Jim to defend the Terraformer and personally oversees its deployment.

Doron and the elders allow the Terrians to use their military technology against the human forces, but they are heavily outnumbered. The Terraformer begins poisoning Terra with oxygen. When Jim sees Mala fighting Stewart after Stewart shot down Senn, he realises the destruction of the Terrians is unjust. He turns against Hemmer and destroys the Terraformer with missiles, killing Hemmer. Mala, Giddy and Stewart escape the resulting fireball, but Jim's critically damaged ship is consumed, and he accepts his death peacefully.

With the Terraformer destroyed, humans and Terrians agree to live in peace. The humans abandon the Ark and establish a city-sized, oxygen-filled tent colony on Terra. A giant statue is erected in Jim's honour.

== Cast ==
- Evan Rachel Wood as Mala, a curious Terrian who take cares of her father Roven
- Luke Wilson as Lieutenant James "Jim" Stanton, a human military pilot who joins forces with Mala
- Brian Cox as General Hemmer, the human leader of the military wing of the Ark
- James Garner as Doron, leader of the Terrians
- David Cross as Giddy, Jim's robot assistant
- Chris Evans as Stewart Stanton, Jim's younger brother
- Dennis Quaid as Roven, Mala's handicapped father
- Justin Long as Senn, Mala's boyfriend
- Danny Glover as President Chen, the human leader in the Ark
- Amanda Peet as Maria Montez, one of the human Board Council members of the Ark
- Mark Hamill as Elder Orin
- Tiffany Brevard as Singer Soloist
- Danny Trejo as Elder Berum
- Phil LaMarr as Fabric Merchant
- Laraine Newman as Toy Merchant
- Ron Perlman as Elder Vorin

== Release ==
Roadside Attractions handled theatrical marketing in North America and used its business relationship with Lionsgate to open the film wide in the United States. Battle for Terra received uncharacteristically little marketing for a wide release film. The television campaign consisted of a small number of television spots on Cartoon Network and a handful of network television ads in select markets. Awareness for the film on its opening weekend was subsequently little to non-existent. This strategy of having a disproportionately small advertising campaign for a wide release was employed only one other time a year earlier with the film Delgo. The results for that film were disastrous as the $40 million Delgo grossed a mere $694,782 on 2,160 screens. The lower costing Battle for Terra fared considerably better by taking in more than twice as much revenue ($1,647,083) on roughly half as many screens (1,159) and continued on to gross $6 million internationally. Battle For Terra opened May 1 in the United States against 2 other wide releases: X-Men Origins: Wolverine (4,099 screens) and Ghosts of Girlfriends Past (3,175).

=== Home media ===
Battle for Terra was released on DVD and Blu-ray Disc on September 22, 2009 by Lionsgate Home Entertainment. Battle for Terra was released in France in French and English versions by Rézo Films on DVD and Blu-ray Disc on October 20, 2010 and include a 3D version of the movie with 4 3D glasses. A Region B Blu-ray 3D was released in Germany. The film is also available to purchase on Fandango at Home (formerly known as Vudu) streaming service.

== Reception ==
The film has received mixed reviews from critics. Based on 96 reviews collected by Rotten Tomatoes, the film has an average rating of 5.52/10, and a score of 50% from critics, saying that "Despite its earnest aspirations to be a thought-provoking sci-fi alternative, Battle for Terra lacks both a cohesive story and polished visuals, and fails to resonate." Another review aggregator, Metacritic, gives the film an average score of 54% based on 19 reviews, indicating "mixed or average" reviews.

The film opened at #12 in the United States, grossing $1,082,064 in 1,159 theaters with an average of $934 per theater. The film's international box office began May 14, 2009 in Russia with a 5th place opening of $332,634 at 83 screens. Battle for Terra's current worldwide total is $6,101,046.

== Accolades ==
Annecy International Animated Film Festival 2009

| Award | Category | Nominee | Result |
|---|---|---|---|
| Cristal Award | Best Feature | Aristomenis Tsirbas | Nominated |

Giffoni Film Festival 2008

| Award | Category | Nominee | Result |
|---|---|---|---|
| Silver Gryphon | First Feature Competition | Aristomenis Tsirbas and Dane Allan Smith | Won |

Heartland Film Festival 2008

| Award | Nominee | Result |
|---|---|---|
| Crystal Heart Award | Aristomenis Tsirbas | Won |

Ottawa International Animation Festival 2008

| Award | Category | Nominee | Result |
|---|---|---|---|
| Grand Prize Award | Best Animated Feature Film | Aristomenis Tsirbas and Dane Allan Smith | Won |
