= Pamela Pettler =

American screenwriter

- Occupation(s): Screenwriter, television producer, television writer
- Years active: 1982–present

Pamela Pettler is an American screenwriter, television producer, and television writer.

== Career ==
In television, she has written episodes for ABC Weekend Specials, Charles in Charge, CBS Summer Playhouse, Clueless (also co-executive producer), Saved by the Bell: The New Class and All About Us (also co-executive producer and developer).

In film, her credits include the animated films Monster House, Corpse Bride and 9. The latter two films involved Tim Burton, who directed and produced Corpse Bride and produced 9, which was directed by Shane Acker. In 2003, Pettler was hired to do a rewrite of Burton's 2005 film adaptation of the book Charlie and the Chocolate Factory. In 2008, Pettler was hired to write a film adaptation of the board game Monopoly, with Ridley Scott attached as director, however the film has since been stuck in development hell. She also wrote a draft of the screenplay for the animated The Addams Family film, based on the comics by Charles Addams. On December 26, 1988, she signed a deal with Columbia Pictures Television.
