= Life Fantastic =

Studio album by Man Man
- Released: May 10, 2011
- Genre: Experimental rock
- Label: Anti-
- Producer: Mike Mogis

Man Man chronology
| Rabbit Habits (2008) | Life Fantastic (2011) | On Oni Pond (2013) |

Life Fantastic is the fourth album by the experimental indie rock band Man Man. The album was produced by Mike Mogis, marking the first time the band has worked with an outside producer.

== Critical reception ==
Professional ratings
Review scores
| Source | Rating |
|---|---|
| Consequence of Sound | C+ |
| Paste | 7/10 |
| Pitchfork | 7.4/10 |

Pitchfork called the album "by far their most tasteful and well-produced record to date," with the band having "dialed down the wacky factor" in favor of a cleaner, darker and more autobiographical tone, demonstrated in their lyrics with references to self-mutilation and emotionally taxing relationships. Honus stated that they desired to acquire a sound that he felt they had lost since before they became Man Man, and said to "rectify" this that they went on several Creative Commons websites to find songs they felt had the poignant sting of their proto-sound.

== Track listing ==
1. "Knuckle Down" - 3:07
2. "Piranhas Club" - 3:52
3. "Steak Knives" - 3:26
4. "Dark Arts" - 3:49
5. "Haute Tropique" - 3:51
6. "Shameless" - 6:45
7. "Spooky Jookie" - 4:20
8. "Eel Bros" - 0:50
9. "Bangkok Necktie" - 2:51
10. "Life Fantastic" - 4:43
11. "Oh, La Brea" - 4:48

Deluxe Edition bonus tracks (iTunes Exclusive):

- "Mayan Nights" - 2:41
- "Trunk Eyes" - 2:57
- "Hourglass" - 2:01

== Personnel ==
- Honus - forethroat lead vocals, primitive piano tickling, synthesizer slantings, magic lil guitar dusting
- Chang - synthesizer abuse, mallets of heaven, truly dreamy horns, assorted saxophones, bookworm bass clarinet, melancholy melodica shadow, percussive bangs, stabthroat backing vocals
- Pow - drumming magic, percussiveness, lowthroat backing vocals
- Critter - guitar shredding, mallet twinkling, trumpeter swan, glowworm backing vocals
- T. Moth - bass line jopping, synthesizer linking, additional piano clangs, crazerthroat backing vocals

Additional musicians

- Nate Walcott - string arrangements
- Frank Seligman, Tracy Dunn, Paul Ledwon, Amy Peterson - strings
- Matt Maginn, Steve Bartalomei, Ben Brodin - handclaps
- Neely Jenkins - backing vocals on tracks 1, 2, 4, 6 & 10
- Susan Sanchez - backing vocals on tracks 2, 4, 6 & 11
- Laura Burhenn - backing vocals on tracks 2, 4, 6 & 11
- Stella Mogis - backing vocals on tracks 4, 5 & 10
- Tim Kasher - backing vocals on tracks 4 & 9
- Ted Stevens - backing vocals on track 4
- Denny Mogis - backing vocals on track 4
