= 9 (2005 film) =

2005 animated short film by Shane Acker

- Poster for the short film
- Directed by: Shane Acker
- Written by: Shane Acker
- Produced by: Shane Acker
- Music by: Earganic
- Production company: UCLA's Animation Workshop
- Distributed by: Thinkart Films
- Release date: April 11, 2005
- Running time: 11 minutes
- Country: United States

9 is a 2005 animated science fiction short film created by Shane Acker as a student project at the UCLA Animation Workshop. Tim Burton saw the film and later produced a feature-length adaptation also titled 9 (2009), directed by Acker and distributed by Focus Features. The film was presented at the Indianapolis International Film Festival. It was nominated for an Academy Award for Best Animated Short Film, and won a Student Academy Award for Best Animation. It was released on April 21, 2005.

== Plot ==
9 is a sentient rag doll who appears to be the last of his kind, living in the ruins of a decaying, post-apocalyptic Earth. Hunting 9 relentlessly is the Cat Beast, a mechanical monster with a cat's skull for its head. It appears to be guided by a small glowing talisman which it holds in its claws. Sitting quietly, 9 stares into the mirrored surface of his own strange talisman and has a flashback.

In the flashback, 9 searches the ruins with his mentor, 5, a one-eyed rag doll. The Cat Beast attacks the pair and consequently kills 5 by sucking his soul out from his mouth and 9 escapes.

9 is woken from the memory by the warning green glow of the mirrored talisman. The Cat Beast chases 9 into a building and reveals that it has not only taken the other rag dolls' souls, but also wears their numbered skins like a garment. Eventually, it is caught into a trap set by 9 and falls to its death.

9 salvages the skins of the other rag dolls and prepares them to be ceremonially burned. As he looks sadly at the skin of 5, the two talismans begin to glow. 9 realizes that they are two halves of a whole and puts them together. A beam of green light erupts from the united talisman, and the spirits of the eight slain rag dolls 1, 2, 3, 4, 5, 6, 7 and 8 emerge, returning to their rag doll skins to be at peace. Before disappearing, 5's soul turns to 9 and nods in approval.

In the morning, 9 walks off into the wasteland, leaving the empty talisman behind in the sand.

== Themes and motifs ==
Humanity and machines: Director Shane Acker has openly rejected the analysis of 9 being a "human vs. machine" narrative, saying instead: "It's not just man against machine, because our heroes are machines, as well... but it's the humanity within the machine, tempering the machine with morality... empathy... compassion."

Commonalities of humans: The characters' lack of verbal speech and near-identical appearances were intended to highlight the innate ways that every person is alike with only certain individual aspects that set us apart. This contributes to the similarities between the rag dolls and humans.

Humans and nature: Acker has said that the "post-human" setting of the film is the result of a man-made apocalypse, but nature has inevitably reclaimed the world. In this way, nature is inseparable from mankind.

== Production ==
9 was originally supposed to last three minutes, but was later extended to ten. It was meant to be a stop-motion film, but was later made using CGI. The 2D elements of the film were made by drawing, painting, and using Photoshop. The puppet characters and stop-motion animation were inspired by those in the film Balance directed by Wolfgang and Cristoph Lauenstein.

== Awards ==
Awarded

- Student Academy Award – Gold Award for Animation
- SIGGRAPH – Best in Show
- Animex – First Prize, 3D Character Animation
- Academy of Television Arts & Sciences Foundation College Awards – First Prize, Non-traditional Animation
- Florida Film Festival, Newport Beach Film Festival – Best Animated Short

Nominated

- Academy Award – Best Animated Short

== Feature film ==
9 is an animated feature film (which the short film accompanied on DVD and Blu-ray) adapted from the short film. It was produced in part by Tim Burton, Timur Bekmambetov, and Jim Lemley, and released on September 9, 2009 by Focus Features. Shane Acker stayed on as director and the screenplay was written by Pamela Pettler. The lead voice actors are Elijah Wood, Jennifer Connelly, John C. Reilly, Martin Landau, Crispin Glover, Fred Tatasciore, and Christopher Plummer.

== See also ==
- List of animated feature films of 2005
- List of science fiction films
