= Timescape (2022 film) =

- Film poster
- Directed by: Aristomenis Tsirbas
- Written by: Aristomenis Tsirbas
- Produced by: David-Alexandre Coiteux
- Starring: Sofian Oleniuk; Lola Rossignol-Arts; Patricia Summersett
- Cinematography: Martin Bouchard
- Edited by: Aristomenis Tsirbas
- Music by: Mateo Messina
- Production companies: Fullum Films and Studios; Menithings Productions; Empress Road Pictures
- Distributed by: TVA Films
- Release dates: July 31, 2022 (Fantasia); August 19, 2022 (Canada); March 23, 2023 (Stream); June 29, 2023 (Intl.)
- Running time: 82 minutes
- Country: Canada
- Language: English
- Budget: $300,000
- Box office: $960,000

Timescape is a 2022 Canadian action-adventure science fiction film about two young strangers discovering a mysterious spacecraft that catapults them millions of years into the past. The film was written, edited, and directed by Aristomenis Tsirbas. It premiered on July 31, 2022, at the Fantasia Film Festival, where it won the Silver Audience Award for Best Quebec Feature. Its theatrical rollout began on August 19, 2022 in the province of Quebec, Canada before expanding to the rest of the world.

== Plot ==
Jason, a brilliant but misunderstood young boy, discovers a mysterious spacecraft that crash-landed in a nearby forest. Inside he meets Lara, an equally curious girl who discovered the alien craft moments before. While attempting to figure out how to operate the vessel, the two are catapulted back in time to final days of the great dinosaurs. The vessel is indeed a Time Machine. With the help of MIA, the ship's floating mobile intelligent assistant, the adventurers race against time to repair the ship and return home before the spectacular impact of a historic asteroid.

== Cast ==
- Sofian Oleniuk as Jason
- Lola Rossignol-Arts as Lara
- Patricia Summersett as Xev
- Aristomenis Tsirbas as the voice of MIA
- Michel Perron as Glenn
- Eric Davis as John
- Melissa Carter as Vivian
- Nathaniel Amranian as Brett
- Michael Broderick as Police Officer

== Release ==
On August 19, 2022, TVA Films released Timescape theatrically in Quebec, Canada in 44 theaters, where it became the province's most successful family film of 2022.

On June 29, 2023, Timescape began its international theatrical rollout where it over-performed at Russia’s box office. TIMESCAPE was sold in France, Italy, Spain, UK, Hungary, CIS, India, Indonesia, Greece, Japan, Middle East, S. Korea, Taiwan, Latin America, S. Africa, Australia / NS, Mongolia, Canada, and USA.

On March 23, 2023, XYZ Films released Timescape on TUBI for the USA, along with VOD on AppleTV, Google Play, and VUDU.

Timescape's combined worldwide theatrical box office is $960,000 against a budget of $300,000.

== Reception ==
As of its first week in release, the film received positive reviews from critics. Province-wide Quebec publication Le Soleil gave it 3 out of 4 stars, calling it "A new classic" (Translated from French). Otaku no Culture gave it 4 out of 5 stars, concluding that "I can watch this movie repeatedly". The Montreal Gazette credited Timescape with, "This is the real deal, with CGI special effects to rival the best in the biz”

== Accolades ==
Fantasia Film Festival 2022

Award	Category	Nominee	Result
Silver Audience Award	Best Quebec Feature	Aristomenis Tsirbas	Won
