= On Oni Pond =

Studio album by Man Man
- Released: September 10, 2013
- Genre: Experimental rock
- Length: 45:50
- Label: Anti-

Man Man chronology
Life Fantastic (2011)	On Oni Pond (2013)	Dream Hunting in the Valley of the In-Between (2020)

Professional ratings
Aggregate scores
Source	Rating
Metacritic	73/100
Review scores
Source	Rating
AllMusic	3/5 stars
The A.V. Club	B+
Consequence of Sound	4/5 stars
Pitchfork	6.4/10

On Oni Pond is the fifth studio album by American band Man Man. It was released in September 2013 by Anti- Records.

== Track listing ==
No.	Title	Length
1.	"Oni Swan"	0:39
2.	"Pink Wonton"	3:19
3.	"End Boss"	4:12
4.	"Head On (Hold On to Your Heart)"	4:25
5.	"King Shiv"	5:06
6.	"Loot My Body"	3:25
7.	"Deep Cover"	3:03
8.	"Pyramids"	3:54
9.	"Sparks"	3:34
10.	"Paul's Grotesque"	3:50
11.	"Fangs"	5:37
12.	"Curtains"	1:03
13.	"Born Tight"	3:43

== Personnel ==
Man Man

- Honus Honus – lead vocalist, piano/organ
- Pow Pow – drums, percussion, loops, programming

Additional musicians

- Horn arrangements – Adam Schatz
- Horns – Brandon Lerbs, Tommy Van Den Berg, Willie Karpf, and Andrew Beckstrom
- String arrangements – Nate Walcott
- Strings – Frank Seligman, Tracy Dunn, Keith Plenert, and Phyllis Duncan
- Jamey "T. Moth" Robinson – assorted synth squiggles, bass bops, celeste, backing vocals (2, 3, 4, 5, 8, 9, 10, 13)
- Adam "Brown Sugar" Schatz – assorted saxophone, keyboards, backing vocals (1, 2, 3, 4, 6, 9, 10, 11, 13)
- Mike Mogis – guitar/bass (2, 3, 4, 6, 8, 9, 10, 11, 13)
- Susan Sanchez – vocals (2, 3, 4, 6, 8, 9, 10, 11, 13)
- A. J. Mogis – upright bass (3, 5, 6)
- Kara Nelson – vocals (2, 6)
- Nate Walcott – trumpet solo/arrangement (6)
