= Dream Hunting in the Valley of the In-Between =

Studio album by Man Man
- Released: May 1, 2020
- Length: 48:58
- Label: Sub Pop
- Producer: Cyrus Ghahremani

Man Man chronology
On Oni Pond (2013)	Dream Hunting in the Valley of the In-Between (2020)

Dream Hunting in the Valley of the In-Between is the sixth studio album by American band Man Man. It was released on May 1, 2020, under Sub Pop.

== Critical reception ==
Professional ratings
Aggregate scores
Source	Rating
Metacritic	77/100
Review scores
Source	Rating
AllMusic	3.5/5 stars
Exclaim!	7/10
Rolling Stone	4/5 stars
Under the Radar	6.5/10

Dream Hunting in the Valley of the In-Between was met with generally favorable reviews from critics. At Metacritic, which assigns a weighted average rating out of 100 to reviews from mainstream publications, this release received an average score of 77, based on 5 reviews.

== Track listing ==
Dream Hunting in the Valley of the In-Between track listing
No.	Title	Length
1.	"Dreamers"	0:50
2.	"Cloud Nein"	3:21
3.	"On the Mend"	3:43
4.	"Lonely Beuys"	3:58
5.	"Future Peg"	2:55
6.	"Goat"	4:10
7.	"Inner Iggy"	2:13
8.	"Hunters"	3:41
9.	"Oyster Point"	0:29
10.	"The Prettiest Song in the World"	2:31
11.	"Animal Attraction"	5:40
12.	"Sheela"	2:39
13.	"Unsweet Meat"	2:37
14.	"Swan"	1:20
15.	"Powder My Wig"	4:12
16.	"If Only"	3:39
17.	"In the Valley of the In-Between"	1:00
