= The Man in a Blue Turban with a Face =

Studio album by Man Man
- Released: October 19, 2004
- Genre: Experimental rock
- Label: Ace Fu

Man Man chronology
Man Man EP (2004)	The Man in a Blue Turban with a Face (2004)	Six Demon Bag (2006)

Professional ratings
Review scores
Source	Rating
Allmusic	3.5/5 stars
Pitchfork Media	(8.0/10)
Prefix Magazine	(8.0/10)
Stylus Magazine	(B+)

The Man in a Blue Turban with a Face is the debut album by experimental rock group Man Man, released in 2004 by Ace Fu Records.

== Track listing ==
1. "Against the Peruvian Monster"
2. "10lb Moustache"
3. "Zebra"
4. "Sarsparillsa"
5. "White Rice, Brown Heart"
6. "Gold Teeth"
7. "Magic Blood"
8. "The Fog or China"
9. "I, Manface"
10. "Man Who Make You Sick"
11. "Werewolf (On the Hood of Yer Heartbreak)"
