= Mia Colucci =

Mia Colucci may refer to:

- Mia Colucci, a character in the 2002–2003 telenovela Rebelde Way, portrayed by Luisana Lopilato
- Mia Colucci, a character in the 2004–2006 telenovela Rebelde, portrayed by Anahí
