= Shane Acker =

American animator, film director, screenwriter, and animation teacher

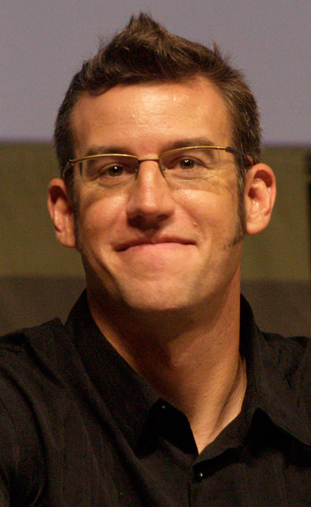
- Acker in July 2009
- Born: Shane Richard Acker; 1971 (age 54–55); Wheaton, Illinois, U.S.
- Education: University of California, Los Angeles
- Occupations: Animator, film director, screenwriter, animation teacher
- Years active: 1999–present
- Spouse: Sibyl Wickersheimer

Shane Richard Acker (born 1971) is an American animator, film director, screenwriter and animation teacher known for directing 9, which is based on his 2005 Academy Award-nominated short film of the same title. He is a graduate of the University of California, Los Angeles.

== Early life ==
As a child, Acker was hyperactive, so his parents encouraged him to draw. Acker originally set a goal of becoming an architect; he earned a bachelor's degree in architecture from the University of Florida in 1994 as well as a master's degree from the UCLA School of the Arts and Architecture.

== Career ==
Upon graduating in 1999, Acker decided to become a film-maker and went to study at UCLA's Animation Workshop. There he created The Hangnail, The Astounding Talents of Mr. Grenade, and 9. In 2004, Acker earned a master's degree in animation. 9 took him four and a half years to complete and was released in 2005. Acker concurrently held a position at New Zealand's Wētā FX in 2004 as an animator, where he focused on CG characters and creatures (most notably for Peter Jackson's The Lord of the Rings: The Return of the King a year or two earlier), followed by South Korea's NCsoft from 2005 to 2006 as both an animator and CG generalist.

Acker wrote, directed, and co-animated the award-winning animated short film 9, which won a student award, was nominated for an Academy Award for Best Animated Short Film, and was shown at SIGGRAPH Electronic Theater. Tim Burton (Beetlejuice, Batman, The Nightmare Before Christmas and Corpse Bride) saw Acker's short film and, with Timur Bekmambetov (director of Wanted) from Focus Features, produced the feature film with Attitude Studios in Luxembourg and Starz Animation in Canada. Acker was the head director and storywriter.

He is also a visiting professor at Loyola Marymount University.

From January 2009 to 2010 Acker worked as an instructor for an advanced animation class at the Gnomon School of Visual Effects. He worked at Gnomon on a short film Plus Minus, co-directed by Aristomenis Tsirbas which was due for release in late 2011 but has yet to be released.

In June 2011, Acker was chosen to direct a new live-action adaptation of the children's book and TV series Thomas & Friends. He was set to work from a script by Chris Viscardi, Will McRobb and Josh Klausner. Wētā FX would have created the film's visual effects with design by Wētā Workshop Design Dept, but the film was canceled after Mattel's acquisition of HIT Entertainment.

In 2011, Acker formed Benthos Studio, an animation production company with partners Greg Little, Jack Mitchell and Brown Bag Films.

In 2012, Shane Acker confirmed that he planned to work with Valve to create his next film, Deep. Like 9, the film takes place in a post-apocalyptic world, although it has no relation to 9 and is set in a different universe, where World War III has forced humans underground. Shane Acker has expressed his interest in creating more PG-13 animated films, of which 9 and Deep are such.

As of 2021, most of Acker's feature films, including his animated feature film Deep, are yet to be released. Acker completed the short film Crusoe, which was shown at the Berlin Short Film Festival. The film won the award for Best Science Fiction Short Film at the festival.

== Influences ==
Shane Acker has cited The Brothers Quay, Don Hertzfeldt, Jan Švankmajer, and brothers Wolfgang and Christoph Lauenstein as inspirations.

== Filmography ==
=== Feature films and TV series ===
| Year | Title | Director | Writer | Notes |
|---|---|---|---|---|
| 2009 | 9 | Yes | Yes | Directorial debut Wrote story |
| 2023 | Fright Krewe | No | No | TV series, executive producer |

=== Short films ===
| Year | Title | Director | Writer | Animator | Notes |
|---|---|---|---|---|---|
| 1999 | The Hangnail | Yes | Yes | Yes | |
| 2003 | The Astounding Talents of Mr. Grenade | Yes | Yes | No | Also cinematographer |
| 2005 | 9 | Yes | Yes | Yes | |
| 2010 | A Jake and a Tom | No | No | Yes | |
| 2010 | Plus Minus | Yes | No | No | |
| 2021 | Crusoe | Yes | Yes | Yes | Also cinematographer, production designer, and producer. |

=== Other works from films ===
| Year | Title | Notes |
|---|---|---|
| 2003 | The Lord of the Rings: The Return of the King | Animator |
| 2012 | Journey 2: The Mysterious Island | Previsualization Artist |
| 2012 | Total Recall | Previsualization Artist |
| 2013 | Oz the Great and Powerful | Previsualization Artist |
| 2013 | 47 Ronin | Previsualization Supervisor |

=== Video games ===
| Year | Title | Contribution |
|---|---|---|
| 2005 | Guild Wars | Cutscene animator |

== Critical reception ==
| Film | Rotten Tomatoes | IMDb | Metacritic |
|---|---|---|---|
| 9 | 58% | 7.1/10 | 60 |

== Awards and nominations ==
| Year | Award | Category | Title | Result |
|---|---|---|---|---|
| 1999 | MicroCineFest Audience Choice Award | Best Short | The Hangnail | Won |
| 2005 | Annecy International Animated Film Festival | Graduation Films (Junior Jury Award) | 9 | Won |
| 2005 | Annecy International Animated Film Festival | Graduation Films (Special Distinction) | 9 | Won |
| 2005 | BendFilm Festival Jury Prize | Best Animated Short | 9 | Won |
| 2005 | Student Academy Award | Animation | 9 | Won |
| 2006 | Academy Award | Best Animated Short Film | 9 | Nominated |
| 2021 | Berlin Short Film Festival | Best Science-Fiction Short Film | Crusoe | Won |
