= To a Man with a Big Nose =

To a Man with a Big Nose is a 3D animated short film by Cecilia Aranovich, based on a poem by Spanish author Francisco de Quevedo. It is in essence a visual adaptation of Quevedo's sonnet. Quevedo is officially credited for the film's script.

The film was selected for Best Animation at the 2006 Fargo Film Festival.
