= Kiwi! =

2006 computer-generated animation

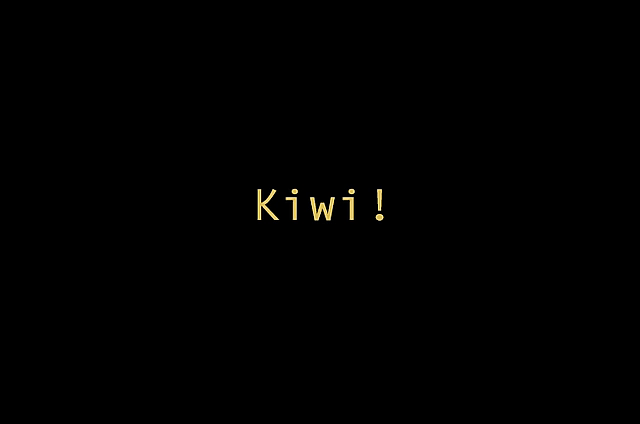
- Title card shown at the beginning and end
- Directed by: Dony Permedi
- Written by: Dony Permedi
- Produced by: Dony Permedi
- Edited by: Dony Permedi
- Music by: Tim Cassell
- Release date: May 5, 2006
- Running time: 3 minutes
- Country: United States

Kiwi! is a 2006 computer-generated animation short film created by Dony Permedi as his Master's Thesis project at the School of Visual Arts in New York City. The music was composed and performed by Tim Cassell. The short gained widespread popularity online after being uploaded to YouTube, becoming a notable Internet phenomenon. Unofficial versions of the film have been paired with the song "Mad World" by Gary Jules, and have circulated widely as viral videos.

== Plot ==
The animation follows a kiwi bird that painstakingly nails rows of trees horizontally along the face of a steep cliff. Once finished, the kiwi climbs to the top of the cliff, dons an aviator's helmet, and leaps off. As the kiwi falls, the camera perspective shifts horizontally; from the kiwi's perspective, he is flying through a forest. A tear forms in its eye as it flaps its vestigial wings, momentarily fulfilling its dream. The video ends ambiguously, with a sound that has been interpreted by viewers as either a crash or the opening of a parachute.

== Reception ==
Kiwi! has received a large following for its deep meaning and heart touching manner. One of the most popular activities in the fan base is to create an alternate ending (usually one where the kiwi survives). As of March 24, 2026, the animation has been viewed over 51 million times. It won official recognition on March 26, 2007, when viewers voted it the Most Adorable video of 2006 in the first annual YouTube Video Awards. This was an event large enough to draw international media attention with ABC News describing Kiwi! as "so cute it hurts" while the International Herald Tribune, critical of the awards, characterized the video as being "sweet but dull."

== See also ==
- Gagarin (Ger.) - cartoon about a caterpillar who dreams of flying.
