= Ryan Colucci =

American film producer

Ryan Patrick Colucci
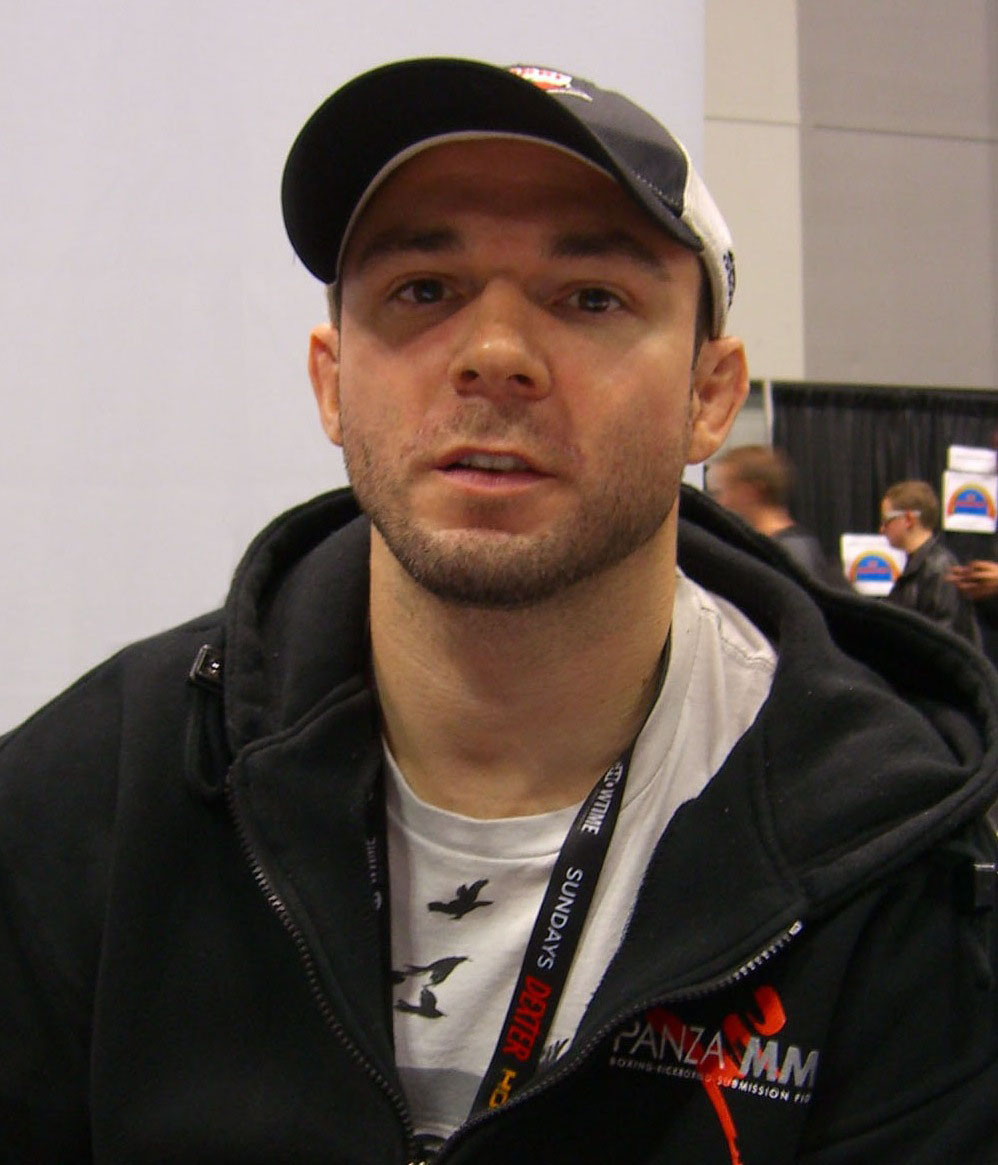
- Colucci at the New York Comic Con, October 2011
- Born: Ryan Patrick Colucci; 1978 (age 47–48); Levittown, New York, United States
- Education: Hofstra University (BA); Villanova University; University of Cambridge; USC School of Cinematic Arts
- Occupations: Film producer Film director Screenwriter; Comic book creator
- Years active: 2007–present
- Organization: Spoke Lane Entertainment
- Notable work: Battle for Terra; Beyond White Space; Harbor Moon
- Website: spokelane.com

Ryan Patrick Colucci (born 1978) is an American film producer, director, screenwriter, and comic book creator. He is best known for producing the animated feature film Battle for Terra (2009), which premiered at the Toronto International Film Festival and was shortlisted for the Academy Award for Best Animated Feature, and for producing and co-writing the science fiction film Beyond White Space (2018).

Colucci is the founder of Spoke Lane Entertainment, a film and publishing company through which he has developed feature films, animated projects, and graphic novels, including Harbor Moon. His work spans live-action and animated cinema, as well as comic and graphic novel publishing.

== Early life ==
Originally from Levittown, New York, he grew up in Syosset, New York. He went to Holy Trinity Diocesan High School in Hicksville, New York. Colucci holds dual citizenship with Italy.

He received his BA in Film Studies & Production from Hofstra University, graduating Suma Cum Laude. Before that he pursued a degree in Accounting from Villanova University and spent a year at Cambridge University in England studying Economics and Political Science. He was a midfielder on Villanova’s division 1 lacrosse team.

== Career ==
After graduating from USC's Peter Stark Producing Program, he worked at Snoot Entertainment, where he was a producer on the CG-animated feature Battle for Terra. That film premiered at the 2007 Toronto International Film Festival and was released on May 1, 2009 from Lionsgate and Roadside Attractions, in both 2D and 3D. It was on the Academy Award short-list for the Best Animated Film Oscar in 2009.

Ryan produced and co-wrote the 2018 sci-fi actioner Beyond White Space, starring Holt McCallany. Prior to that, he directed and wrote the crime thriller Suburban Cowboy. In 2014, he produced and co-wrote With You, a film directed by Grammy-nominated EDM artist Dirty South based on his album of the same name. It debuted at #1 on iTunes in the fall of the same year.

In 2017, Colucci and Zsombor Huszka co-directed the animated short film Orient City: Ronin & The Princess in 2017. The kung fu spaghetti western is currently in development as an animated series and the graphic novel will be published in 2027.

The duo are currently co-directing and producing the hand-drawn animated science fiction thriller film Andover, with Zsombor Huszka.

In 2007, Colucci founded Spoke Lane Entertainment, a feature film and publishing company. Their first graphic novel Harbor Moon debuted at San Diego Comic-Con in July 2010 through Shuster Award-winning publisher Arcana Studio and was officially published in April 2011. Colucci, along with Huszka, then released the graphic novel R.E.M. in 2013 at NY Comic-con. They are developing the animated holiday film Krampus, along with a children’s illustrated book series.

He was previously attached to produce George R.R. Martin's The Skin Trade, the World Fantasy Award-Winning horror novella from the Dark Visions compilation book.

== Filmography ==
- Battle for Terra (2009)
- With You (2014)
- Suburban Cowboy (2017)
- Orient City: Ronin & The Princess (2017)
- Beyond White Space (2018)
- Andover (in-production)

== See also ==
- Battle for Terra
- Beyond White Space
- Independent film
