= 9 (2009 animated film) =

2009 animated film by Shane Acker

- Theatrical release poster
- Directed by: Shane Acker
- Screenplay by: Pamela Pettler
- Story by: Shane Acker
- Based on: 9 by Shane Acker
- Produced by: Jim Lemley; Tim Burton; Timur Bekmambetov; Dana Ginsburg
- Starring: Elijah Wood; John C. Reilly; Jennifer Connelly; Christopher Plummer; Crispin Glover; Martin Landau; Fred Tatasciore
- Cinematography: Kevin R. Adams
- Edited by: Nick Kenway
- Music by: Danny Elfman (themes); Deborah Lurie (score)
- Production companies: Relativity Media; Lux Animation; Tim Burton Productions
- Distributed by: Focus Features
- Release date: September 9, 2009
- Running time: 79 minutes
- Countries: United States; Luxembourg
- Language: English
- Budget: $30 million
- Box office: $48.6 million

9 is a 2009 animated post-apocalyptic science fiction film directed by Shane Acker and written by Pamela Pettler, based on Acker's 2005 short film 9. Set in an alternate version of the 1940s, the film stars Elijah Wood as "9", a rag doll who awakens shortly after the end of humanity following the uprising of machines. John C. Reilly, Jennifer Connelly, Christopher Plummer, Crispin Glover, Martin Landau, and Fred Tatasciore voice supporting roles.

9 was released by Focus Features on September 9, 2009. The film received generally mixed reviews from critics and grossed $49 million on a $30 million budget. It received an Outstanding Producer of Animated Theatrical Motion Pictures nomination at the 21st Producers Guild of America Awards.

== Plot ==
A scientist is commissioned by his government to create a highly intelligent robot in the name of peaceful progress, which Chancellor Ferdinand and his men then seizes and turns into the Fabrication Machine, an automaton that can mass-produce and construct an army of war machines. These machines were deployed in the battlefield where they fought against foreign enemies alongside with their soldiers. However, due to unknown circumstances, the machines become corrupt and turned against humans. The Nation denounces the scientist, labelling him a traitor and a threat to society. The Machines then attacked citizens in populated cities, targeting humans wherever they go. Meanwhile, the scientist creates nine homunculus-like rag dolls via alchemy called "Stitchpunks", each labeled with a number, giving them portions of his own soul via a talisman. He dies upon completing the final Stitchpunk, 9. After the scientist's death, the last remaining pockets of the nation's resistance were wiped out by a deadly gas, eliminating the last humans on earth.

9 awakens some time after the machines have destroyed all organic life on Earth and gone dormant. He ventures outside and meets 2, an elderly inventor, who finds him a working voice box. The last active machine, the Cat Beast, attacks the pair, abducts 2, and takes the talisman. One-eyed healer 5 rescues 9 and takes him to Sanctuary, the tower of an empty cathedral that is home to dogmatic leader 1, his burly bodyguard 8, and the eccentric fountain pen-fingered clairvoyant 6. Against 1's demands, 9 and 5 follow the Cat Beast to a factory and rescue 2. The Cat Beast attacks the trio, but 7 arrives and kills it. 9 curiously connects the talisman to the dormant Fabrication Machine, accidentally reviving it; it kills 2 by sucking out his soul, and the others barely manage to escape.

7 takes 9 and 5 to an abandoned library, where mute scholar twins 3 and 4 reveal the history of the war. 9 draws the symbols on the talisman, which 5 realizes match 6's drawings. 9 and 5 return to Sanctuary to investigate, where 1 reprimands them for endangering them all. The Machine begins assembling new robots, including the Winged Beast, which attacks and burns down Sanctuary. With 7's help, the Stitchpunks manage to destroy the Winged Beast using the engine of a crashed bomber and escape.

Back at the library, 6, 3, and 4 search for information on the talisman. 1 warns them against this, and reveals that he intentionally sent 2 to his death, to the others' dismay. 7 attempts to attack 1, but is chastised. Meanwhile, the Machine uses 2's corpse as a hypnotic lure for its new "Seamstress" robot, which attacks the library. It fails to capture 1, but successfully captures 7 and 8. The other Stitchpunks return to the factory to save them, but 8's soul is absorbed by the machine. 9 goes in alone, saves 7, and destroys the Seamstress with a lure as a distraction. He and 7 escape as the other Stitchpunks blow up the factory, destroying nearly all of the machines.

Believing the Machine to be destroyed, the remaining seven Stitchpunks have a short respite. The damaged but still-functional Machine emerges from the factory's ruins and absorbs 5's soul. Realizing that the deceased Stitchpunks' souls are still trapped inside the Machine, 6 implores the others not to destroy it. The Machine manages to capture 6, who orders 9 to go to the Scientist's workshop for answers before it sucks out his soul. At the workshop, 9 finds a holographic recorded message from the Scientist, revealing both the Machine's and Stitchpunks' origins and explaining how to use the talisman.

Now knowing that the talisman can be used to transfer souls, 9 reunites with the surviving Stitchpunks, who are trying to destroy the Machine. He plans to sacrifice himself to the Machine, distracting it long enough for the others to retrieve the talisman. Having a change of heart, 1 pushes 9 out of the way, allowing the Machine to suck out his soul instead of 9's. 9 removes the talisman and sucks the captive Stitchpunks' souls out of the Machine, destroying it. Afterward, 9 uses the talisman to release the souls of 8, 6, 2, 5 and 1. 9, 7, 4 and 3 watch the freed souls fly up into the sky, causing it to rain; the raindrops contain tiny flecks of bacteria.

== Voice cast ==
- Elijah Wood as 9, the hopeful, heroic part of the Scientist's personality.
- John C. Reilly as 5, the gentle healer portion of the Scientist's personality.
- Jennifer Connelly as 7, the fighter portion of the Scientist's personality, and the only female of the group.
- Christopher Plummer as 1, the fearful and arrogant portion of the Scientist's personality.
- Crispin Glover as 6, the artistic and eccentric portion of the Scientist's personality.
- Fred Tatasciore as 8, the stolid and loyal portion of the Scientist's personality.
  - Tatasciore also voices the radio announcer.
- Martin Landau as 2, the creative genius portion of the Scientist's personality.
- Alan Oppenheimer as the Scientist, the inventor of the Fabrication Machine, and later the nine Stitchpunks.
- Tom Kane as Chancellor Ferdinand, a dictator who was responsible for causing the Fabrication Machine to turn against humanity.
- Helen Wilson as a news reporter.

== Music ==
The film soundtrack was released on August 31, 2009, in physical and digital formats, nine days before the film was released. It includes the themes created by Danny Elfman, Deborah Lurie's film score, and "Welcome Home" by Coheed and Cambria. The latter song was used in two trailers for the film, with minor censoring for the full song in the soundtrack. Along with "Welcome Home", the teaser trailer also features an excerpt from "The Captain" by The Knife, which was also not included in the soundtrack. Other songs within the film that were not included in the soundtrack was the traditional "Dies Irae" chant, performed by Crispin Glover as part of the background score, and "Over the Rainbow", the song from The Wizard of Oz and performed by Judy Garland. The song plays on a 78rpm phonograph record in a lighthearted scene, when the surviving Stitchpunks were momentarily celebrating the destruction of the factory.

== Marketing ==
On December 25, 2008, a trailer was released on Apple.com that features The Knife's "The Captain" and Coheed and Cambria's "Welcome Home".

9 is the second animated feature film to be released by Focus Features, the first being Coraline, written and directed by Henry Selick and based on the book by Neil Gaiman. The trailer for 9 preceded Coraline when it was shown in theaters and released on DVD. A second trailer for 9 first appeared on G4's Attack of the Show and was later shown before Land of the Lost. It is an extensive trailer which includes a bit of the background story behind the existence of the creations. In April 2009, the film's "Scientist" began making journal entries on a Facebook page called "9 Scientist", including essays about each of his nine creations. The "9 Scientist" Facebook page seemingly references events leading up to the release of the film. A viral campaign promotional website for 9 was launched. It shed some light upon the background of the 9 world. The trailer featured several machines: the Cat Beast, a cat-like ambush predator that appeared in the original short film (where it had a green eye, changed to a red eye in the feature film, along with some other changes); the Winged Beast, a pterosaur-like machine with movable blades in its mouth; the Seamstress, a hypnotic serpent that uses threads to restrain victims; Steel War Behemoths, large two-legged machines armed with a machine gun and poison gas mortars which can kill in a matter of seconds; the Fabrication Machine (previously known as B.R.A.I.N. – "Binary Reactive Artificially Intelligent Neurocircuit"), a large, cyclopean machine with many multi-jointed arms; and Seekers, aerial machines with searchlights. Later trailers also reveal the existence of several small spider-like machines. Part of the film's marketing strategy was its release date of September 9, 2009 ("9/9/09").

== Video game ==
Shortly before the film's release, Life released a mobile game adaptation titled 9: The Mobile Game for the iPhone and iPod Touch.

== Reception ==
=== Critical response ===
On Rotten Tomatoes, 9 has an overall approval rating of 57% based on 185 reviews and average rating of 5.90/10. The website's critical consensus states: "Although its story is perhaps too familiar and less complex than some might wish, 9 is visually spectacular, and director Shane Acker's attention to detail succeeds in drawing viewers into the film's universe." On Metacritic, it holds a weighted average score of 60 out of 100 based on reviews from 31 critics, indicating "mixed or average" reviews.

Roger Ebert gave the film three stars out of four, contrasting it with the works of Hayao Miyazaki and saying that, "9 is nevertheless worth seeing... [the visuals] are entrancing." The general sentiment by critics is that the film is "long on imaginative design but less substantial in narrative". Variety's Todd McCarthy says, "In the end, the picture's impact derives mostly from its design and assured execution."

=== Box office ===
The film underperformed at the box office. Its opening weekend landed it at No. 2 behind I Can Do Bad All By Myself with approximately $10,740,446 and $15,160,926 for its five-day opening. The film grossed $48,559,999 worldwide.

=== Accolades ===
Award	Category	Recipient(s)	Result	Ref.
Annie Awards
Annie Awards	Best Animated Effects in a Feature Production	Alexander Feigin	Nominated	
Annie Awards	Best Production Design in a Feature Production	Christophe Vacher	Nominated	
Producers Guild of America Awards	Producer of the Year in Animated Motion Picture	9	Nominated	
Visual Effects Society Awards	Outstanding Animation in an Animated Feature Motion Picture	Ken Duncan, Jinko Gotoh, Daryl Graham, Joe Ksander	Nominated	
Washington D.C. Area Film Critics Association	Best Animated Film	9	Nominated	
Motion Picture Sound Editors
Motion Picture Sound Editors	Best Sound Editing for Music in a Musical Feature Film	Will Files and Pascal Garneau	Nominated	

== Home media ==
The film was released on DVD and Blu-ray on December 29, 2009, three-and-a-half months after the film's theatrical release. The DVD and Blu-ray contained special features such as the director Shane Acker's original 2005 short film of the same name, cast interviews, and commentary by the filmmakers.

== Possible sequel ==
I think there is definitely room. I mean, the way we end the film, there is a slight suggestion that it may be a new beginning. And I think we could continue the journey from where we left off and see how these creatures are existing in a world in which the natural environment is coming back and perhaps even threatening them in some way. Do they make the decision to not affect it, or do they try to affect it in some way? And do they still try to hold on to that humanity within them or do they recognize themselves at being machines too and go off on a different trajectory? So there's lots of idea that I think that we could play with and make another story out of.

— Director Shane Acker, 2009 interview with JoBlo.com

No plans for a sequel have been made, but possibilities were mentioned via the film's 2009 DVD commentary. Director Acker has also mentioned the possibility of a sequel being made because of the lack of darker animated films, claiming that everything is G- and PG-rated with little to no dark elements. In 2009 he said that he will continue to make darker animated films, either doing so with a sequel to 9 or original ideas for future films. Before the theatrical release of the film, Acker and producer Tim Burton stated they were open for a sequel, depending on how well the film was received. Since the film's home release, there have been no further mentions of a sequel, with Acker focusing on projects announced in 2011 (The Adventures of Thomas), 2012 (Deep), 2013 (Beasts of Burden) and other four projects aimed for older audiences of which have not been released, until Crusoe, a comic science fiction short film was released in 2021.

Despite the silence from Acker, in January 2017, the Facebook profile of the character "the Scientist" was updated with a rather cryptic message. The profile had been inactive since 2009, leading some to speculate the teasing of a sequel.

== See also ==
- List of American films of 2009
- 9 (2005 film) – The original short film on which 9 is based
- Rag doll
