= Vincenzo Colucci =

Italian academic veterinarian and pioneer in regeneration research (1846-1919)

- Born: October 12, 1846; Gioiosa Ionica, Province of Calabria, Kingdom of the Two Sicilies
- Died: 1918; Bagni di Lucca, Province of Lucca, Kingdom of Italy
- Scientific career
- Fields: Veterinary medicine Experimental biology
- Workplaces: University of Bologna; University of Parma; University of Pisa

Vincenzo Colucci (12 October 1846 – 1918) was an Italian veterinarian and zoologist.

He was born in Calabria in 1846, and, by the age of five, he had lost both parents (his father, an opponent of the repressive Bourbon rule in the Kingdom of the Two Sicilies, died in prison). His grandfather and uncle arranged for the orphan to have a sound classical education in the town of Cittanova, Calabria, after which he studied in the University of Naples. From there he went to the University of Bologna with the intention of becoming a medical doctor; however, he changed his plans and entered the veterinary school about 1870, where he worked there for the next 15 years, taking on positions of ever-increasing responsibility. In 1886, he joined veterinary faculty at the University of Parma until 1893, when he moved to the Veterinary school of the University of Pisa, remaining there until his death in 1918. In Cittanova, he is honored by a street named Via Vincenzo Colucci.

Although he usually dealt with normal and pathological histology of domestic animals, he published two papers on regeneration in salamanders. The first, in 1886, described the cellular events during regeneration of extirpated limbs and tails. The second, in 1891, demonstrated that the regenerating lens of the eye arises from the iris; three years later in Germany, Gustav Wolff (1894), without mentioning his Italian colleague, published exactly the same result; Emery (1896) suggested that Wolff learned of Colucci’s work from an abstract on page 174 of Zoologischer Jahresbericht für 1891 (1893), repeated the experiment, and passed it off as his own original discovery a year later. Even so, such lens regeneration has long been called Wolffian and not Coluccian. Significantly, Colucci’s regeneration studies were among the first to examine the phenomenon extensively at the cellular level of organization in any animal.
