= Man Man =

American experimental rock band

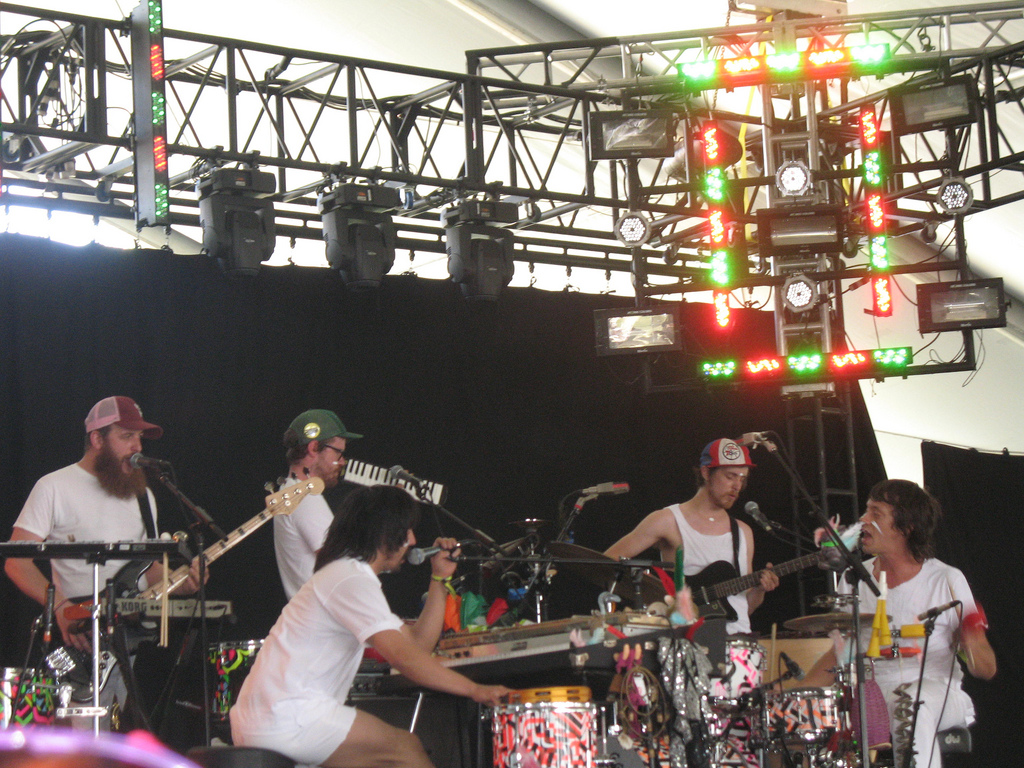
- Man Man at Coachella in 2008

Background information
- Also known as: MM
- Origin: Philadelphia, Pennsylvania, United States
- Genre: Experimental rock
- Years active: 2003–present
- Labels: Sub Pop, Ace Fu, ANTI-
- Members: Honus Honus; Creamio; Samd Smalld; John "Rare Moon" Lee
- Website: www.manmanband.com

Man Man is an American experimental rock band from Philadelphia currently based in Brooklyn. Lead singer, songwriter, multi-instrumentalist Honus Honus (Ryan Kattner) is accompanied by a revolving collective of multi-instrumentalist musicians and vocalists. The usage of monikers/nicknames is a Dadaist nod to aliases assumed by musicians such as The Edge.

== History ==
Man Man released their debut, The Man in a Blue Turban with a Face, in October 2004 on Ace Fu Records, but did not begin to tour extensively until the 2006 release of their second album, Six Demon Bag. In 2007, the band opened for Modest Mouse on several U.S. tours, gaining them further public attention. Not long afterward, Nike aired a series of commercials starring Rainn Wilson with Man Man's "10 lb Mustache" as the background music. "10 lb Mustache", "Feathers", and "Engrish Bwudd" were featured in season 3, episode 8 of the TV show Weeds written by Rolin Jones. The band also recorded a cover of "Little Boxes" for the title sequence of that episode.

Man Man released their third studio album, Rabbit Habits, on ANTI- in 2008, and embarked on a North American tour in March 2008, with Yeasayer and Tim Fite splitting dates. They performed at numerous festivals including Voodoo Experience, Coachella Valley Music and Arts Festival, All Tomorrow's Parties, Primavera Sound, and the Meredith Music Festival that same year.

Man Man released their fourth album, Life Fantastic, in May 2011 with producer Mike Mogis (of Bright Eyes and Monsters of Folk fame). The album featured a more somber sound than previous releases.

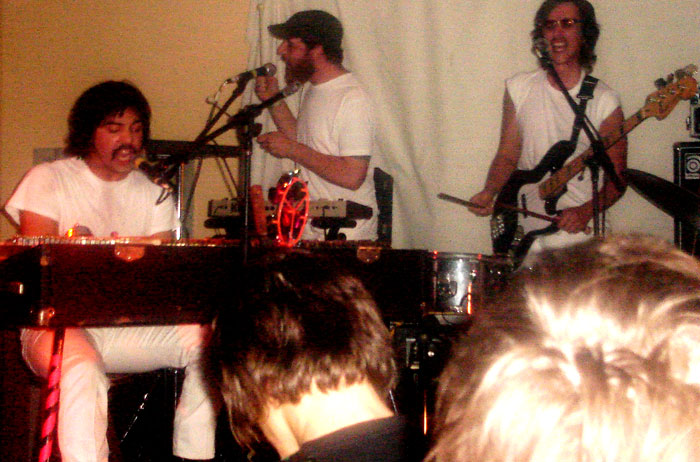
Man Man playing at Pop Montreal in 2005

In 2011 and 2017, Honus released albums with the indie supergroup Mister Heavenly.

Man Man's fifth studio album, On Oni Pond, was released on September 10, 2013. The album was again produced by Mike Mogis. The first single, "Head On", peaked at #32 on the Billboard Alternative Songs chart.

In 2015, Honus completed both a solo album and an album of children's music. On November 4, 2016, Honus released his solo album, Use Your Delusion.

On August 9, 2019, the band released a two-song single for Sub Pop Records Singles Series titled "Beached" / "Witch". Six months later in February, 2020, the band announced the release of their first studio album in seven years, Dream Hunting in the Valley of the In-Between. In 2020, they were featured in the game Cyberpunk 2077 with the previously unreleased song "So It Goes", credited in-universe to "Fingers and the Outlaws".

Kattner (Honus) also acts having been seen in the short film "So It Goes" with Mary Elizabeth Winstead directed by Justin Carlton, "Use Your Delusion" directed by Justin Carlton and Jamie Vega Wheeler, the indie film "Woe" (2021) by Matthew Goodhue, Josh Forbes "Destroy All Neighbors" (2024) (starring Jonah Ray and Alex Winters) and most recently was a writer/actor/composer/music supervisor on AMC's critically acclaimed The Vampire Lestat (2026) based on the Anne Rice novel by the same name..

== Multi-instrumental variety ==
Instruments played by the band include clavinet, Moog Little Phatty, sousaphone, saxophone, trumpet, French horn, flute, bass clarinet, drum set, euphonium, Fender Jazz Bass, Danelectro baritone guitar, xylophone, marimba, melodica and various percussive instruments including pots and pans, toy noisemakers, Chinese funeral horns, spoons, smashing plates, and fireworks.

== Members ==
- Honus Honus: vocals, piano, electric piano, organ, guitar, bass, ukulele, percussion
- Creamio: trap kit, percussion
- Samd Smalld: guitar, bass marimba, rice cooker, full-bearded vocals, Furred harp
- John "Rare Moon" Lee: guitar, bass, clarinet, drum stick

=== Past members ===
Previous members have included "Starchy" Joe Plummer, Mature Kevin (Kevin Riggin), Harry "Eggs Foster, Tiberius Lyn, Pow Pow (Christopher Powell), Jazz Diesel (Dylan Ryan), Sweet Chestnut (Dan Scofield), Brown Sugar (Adam Schatz), Shono (Bryan Murphy), Kritter Krat/Cougar/Alejandro Borg (Russell Higbee), Turkey Moth/Giamebee (Jamey Robinson), Chang Wang (Billy Blaise Dufala), Blanco (Steven Dufala), Brett Swett (Brett Morris), Les Mizzle (Craig Van Hise), G. Clinton Killingsworth (Sam Henderson), Liz Rywelski, King Cyrus King (Cyrus Ghahremani), Dicky Betts Jr. (Matt Gibson), Moonbeam (Evander Green), Thu Butler (Casey Butler), Jefferson, Brown Sugar Jr. (Michael Kammers), Pee Wee Tay Tay, Shit Foot (Stephanie Smith), Sara Yurman, and Sergei Sogay (Chris Shar).

== Discography ==
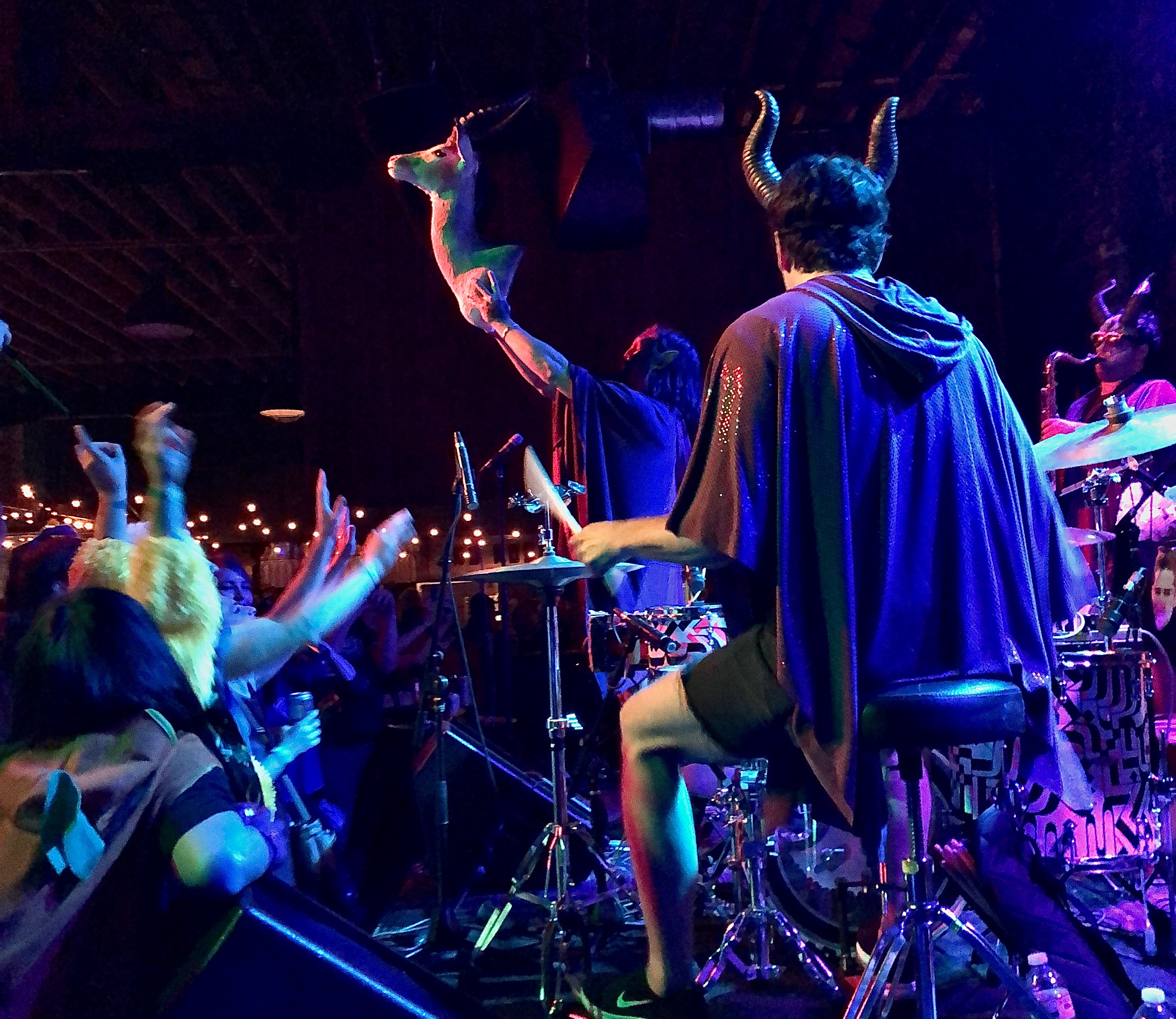
Man Man Halloween Show (2019) at The Hi Hat, Los Angeles

=== Studio albums ===
- The Man in a Blue Turban with a Face (2004)
- Six Demon Bag (2006)
- Rabbit Habits (2008)
- Life Fantastic (2011)
- On Oni Pond (2013)
- Dream Hunting in the Valley of the In-Between (2020)
- Carrot On Strings (2024)

=== Solo albums ===
- Use Your Delusion (2016)

=== Extended plays ===
- Man Man EP (2004)
- Little Torments 7" (2008)
- Dig Deep (2022)

=== Singles ===
- "Head On (Hold On To Your Heart)" - No. 32 Alternative Songs
- "Beached" / "Witch"
- "So It Goes"
