= Rabbit Habits =

Studio album by Man Man
- Released: April 8, 2008
- Genre: Experimental rock
- Length: 46:52
- Label: Anti-

Man Man chronology
Six Demon Bag (2006)	Rabbit Habits (2008)	Little Torments (2008)

Professional ratings
Aggregate scores
Source	Rating
Metacritic	74/100
Review scores
Source	Rating
AllMusic	4/5 stars
The Austin Chronicle	3/5 stars
The A.V. Club	B
The Boston Globe	(not rated)
Paste	(positive)
Pitchfork	8/10 stars
Spin	2/5 stars
The Village Voice	(positive)

Rabbit Habits is the third album by experimental rock group Man Man. The album incorporates raspy vocals, jangly guitars, synths, bells, acoustic guitar, and, as heard on "Mysteries of the Universe Unraveled" and "Doo Right", fireworks.

Honus Honus described his change in vocal approach for the album:

"[On] the first two Man Man records I didn’t know how to sing at all. I didn’t think there would be more than one or two records, so all the songs I wrote on those albums are just pipe shredders, so it destroyed my range and those songs are the hardest to sing as I got older with a band, you know? Your body starts to figure out how not to do it so the songs from, like, Rabbit Habits-on are just more catered to not destroying your voice."

== Track listing ==
1. "Mister Jung Stuffed" – 2:28
2. "Hurly / Burly" – 3:51
3. "The Ballad of Butter Beans" – 4:28
4. "Big Trouble" – 5:05
5. "Mysteries of the Universe Unraveled" – 0:09
6. "Doo Right" – 1:38
7. "Easy Eats or Dirty Doctor Galapagos" – 2:24
8. "Harpoon Fever (Queequeg's Playhouse)" – 3:19
9. "El Azteca" – 1:43
10. "Rabbit Habits" – 2:48
11. "Top Drawer" – 3:26
12. "Poor Jackie" – 8:23
13. "Whalebones" – 7:14
