= The Tale of How =

- Directed by: Blackheart Gang
- Music by: Markus Wormstorm
- Release date: 2006
- Running time: 5'
- Country: South Africa

The Tale of How is a 2006 South African animated film.

== Synopsis ==
A giant octopus with a tree growing in his head devours the dodos that live there.

== Awards ==
- Woodstock Film Festival 2006 - Honorary Mention
- Byron Bay International Film Festival 2008 - Best Animation
