= Six Demon Bag =

Studio album by Man Man
- Released: February 21, 2006
- Genre: Experimental rock
- Length: 40:26
- Label: Ace Fu
- Producer: Craig Van Hise

Man Man chronology
| The Man In a Blue Turban With a Face (2004) | Six Demon Bag (2006) | Rabbit Habits (2008) |

Six Demon Bag is the second album by experimental rock group Man Man, known mainly for their carnivalesque sound and well-received live shows.

== Background ==
Honus Honus discussed the differences between this album and their first album:

I feel like the first album had a lot of the same emotions going on but the rough production value kind of obscured the sentiments. I can't even hear half the lyrics I'm singing on the first record. It's a bit of a charm but at the same time it makes for a difficult listening experience. I won't go into exact details but the period of my life in which Van Helsing Boombox was written is definitely not making any highlight reel. Dark days.

A music video for "Engrish Bwudd" was directed by Lindsay Kovnat, and was featured on the Nicktoons Network Animation Festival in 2006.

Man Man planned a tour to celebrate the 10th anniversary of the album's release in 2016 during which they played it start to finish.

== Critical reception ==
Professional ratings
Aggregate scores
| Source | Rating |
|---|---|
| Metacritic | 79/100 |
Review scores
| Source | Rating |
| Allmusic | 3/5 stars |
| The Phoenix | 3/4 stars |
| Pitchfork | (8.3/10) |
| PopMatters | (9/10) |
| Prefix Magazine | (9.0/10) |
| Stylus Magazine | (B+) |
| Tiny Mix Tapes | 3.5/5 stars |

Six Demon Bag was met with "generally favorable" reviews from critics. At Metacritic, which assigns a weighted average rating out of 100 to reviews from mainstream publications, this release received an average score of 79, based on 17 reviews.

The album was placed on Obscure Sound's list of the best albums of 2006 at number 34 and Pitchfork's list of the top 50 albums of 2006 at number 20.

Pitchfork also listed the song "Van Helsing Boombox" as the 350th best song of the 2000s.

== Track listing ==
1. "Feathers" – 2:08
2. "Engrish Bwudd" – 3:33
3. "Banana Ghost" – 2:54
4. "Young Einstein on the Beach" – 0:58
5. "Skin Tension" – 3:46
6. "Black Mission Goggles" – 4:59
7. "Hot Bat" – 1:26
8. "Push the Eagles Stomach" – 3:39
9. "Spider Cider" – 3:05
10. "Van Helsing Boombox" – 3:44
11. "Tunneling Through the Guy" – 5:25
12. "Fishstick Gumbo" – 0:04
13. "Ice Dogs" – 4:45
