= Gnomon School of Visual Effects =

College in California, USA

Gnomon
- Founder: Alex Alvarez
- Established: 1997
- Location: North Hollywood, California, United States
- Website: www.gnomon.edu

Gnomon is a for-profit college located in the NoHo Arts District in North Hollywood, California. The school focuses on artistic and technical training for careers in the visual effects and games industries. It was founded in 1997 by Alex Alvarez. Gnomon was originally created to train industry artists, though it has evolved into a more all-encompassing art school. In March 2011, Fast Company included Gnomon in its list of the 10 Most Innovative Companies in Film.

== Academics ==
Gnomon offers two-, and four-year (three-year optional by waiving summer break) training options in Entertainment Design and Digital Production, as well as individual and online courses, various software workshops, online Master Classes, and the Gnomon Gallery, which was created to showcase art from the entertainment industry and Gnomon students.

Gnomon is approved as a non-degree vocational institution from the Bureau for Private Postsecondary Education. The school is accredited by the Accrediting Commission on Career Schools and Colleges, a national accrediting agency.

Beyond providing an art education, Gnomon focuses on job placement for graduates by placing emphasis on community networking and exposure to professionals. All of Gnomon's instructors are current working professionals from studios such as Blizzard Entertainment, Naughty Dog, DreamWorks, Industrial Light & Magic, Sony Pictures Imageworks, Disney, and Digital Domain. Gnomon graduates have gone on to work at film and game studios such as Digital Domain, EA, Weta Digital, Double Negative, Zoic Studios, Sony Interactive, Rhythm & Hues and more.

Gnomon has been referred to as "the MIT of visual effects".

In June 2010, Gnomon announced the formation of Gnomon Studios, where advanced Gnomon students gain professional experience by working on short films in a real studio environment under the guidance of production professionals. Gnomon Studios began working on Shane Acker's short film, "Plus Minus."

== See also ==
- Design engineer
- List of 3D modeling software and List of 3D rendering software
- List of 2D animation software and List of 3D animation software
